= Jeet Gannguli discography =

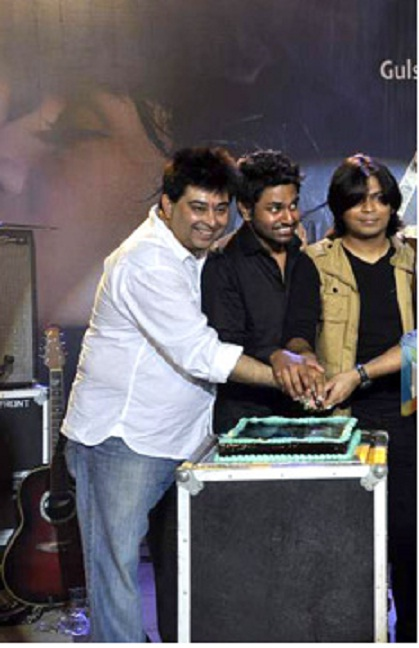
- Gannguli (left) at Aashiqui 2 music concert in 2013
- Soundtrack albums: 1
- Singles: 22

Jeet Gannguli popularly known as Jeet, is a score composer of Bengali and Hindi movies. Gannguli is a music director in Bollywood, scoring music for films.

Gannguli got his first break when Sanjay Gadhvi was signed on to direct Tere Liye and he, in turn, signed on his friends Jeet Gannguli and Pritam as music composers. In 2002 Yash Raj Films signed Gadhvi up to direct Mere Yaar Ki Shaadi Hai, for which the Gannguli-Pritam duo composed the music.

After the duo parted ways, Jeet started scoring music for Hindi and Bengali films, TV serials and Jingles. Jeet Gannguli has also composed music for a single track sung by well known singer in Hindi, Bengali.

== Bollywood discography ==
†	Denotes films that have not yet been released

Year	Film	Songs	Notes
2001	Tere Liye	"All Songs"	Debut in Bollywood as Jeet Ganguly Along with Pritam
2002	Mere Yaar Ki Shaadi Hai	"All Songs"	Along with Pritam
2003	Mudda – The Issue	"All Songs"	Along with Pritam
2005	Nishaan : The Target	6 Song- O Nakhrewali, Bheega Bheega Tera Ye Badan, Lai Lai La La La, Tu Katil Hai Tu Khooni hai, Jhatka De Gayi Re, Hey hey	Along with Anup Jalota
2008	Cheenti Cheenti Bang Bang	"All Songs"	Animation Film; Marathi, Telugu, Bengali Languages
2009	Morning Walk	"All Songs"	Mirchi Music Awards; Upcoming Music Composer of The Year
2010	Mumbai Cutting	"All Songs"	"Unknown"
2012	Blood Money	5 Songs-: Chaahat; Gunaah; Gunaah (Unplugged); Jo Tere Sang; Jo Tere Sang (Remix)	Along with Pranay M. Rijia or Pranay Rijia, Sangeet Haldipur-Siddharth Haldipur, Sangeet-Siddharth
2012	Shirin Farhad Ki Toh Nikal Padi	"All Songs"	
2012	Raaz 3D	5 songs-: Zindagi Se; Rafta Rafta; O My Love; Kya Raaz Hai; Khayalon Mein Bhi	Along with Rashid Khan
2013	Aashiqui 2	6 Songs-: Chahun Main Ya Naa; Hum Mar Jayenge; Piya Aye Na; Bhula Dena; Milne Hai Mujhse Aayi; Aasan Nahin Yahan	Won: Filmfare Awards; IIFA Awards; For Best Music Director Along with Mithoon, Ankit Tiwari
2013	Life Mein Hungama Hai	"All Songs"	
2014	Nee Jathaga Nenundali	5 Songs-: Premante Emito "Aasan Nahin Yahan"; Kshaminchave Cheli "Bhula Dena"; Nijamaa Kaada (Chahun Main Ya Naa); Ee Pichchey Premani (Hum Mar Jayenge); Kanabadunaa "Piya Aye Na"	Telugu, Along with Mithoon, Ankit Tiwari
2014	Youngistaan	2 Songs-: Suno Na Sangemarmar; Suno Na Sangemarmar (Remix)	Along with Sneha Khanwalkar, Shiraz Uppal
2014	CityLights	"All Songs"	Also As Singer
2014	Singham Returns	1 Song- Sun Le Zara	Along with Ankit Tiwari, Meet Bros Anjjan, Yo Yo Honey Singh
2015	Alone	1 Song- Chand Aasmano Se Laapata	Along with Mithoon, Raghav Sachar, Ankit Tiwari
2015	Khamoshiyan	5 Songs-: Khamoshiyan; Khamoshiyan (Unplgged); Khamoshiyan (Female); Baatein Ye Kabhi Na (Male); Baatein Ye Kabhi Na (Female)	Along with Ankit Tiwari, Bobby-Imran, Navad Zafar
2015	Mr. X	3 Songs -: Mr.X (Title Song); Teri Khushboo (Male); Teri Khushboo (Female)	Along with Ankit Tiwari, Ankur Tiwari
2015	Welcome 2 Karachi	1 Song- Shakira	Along with Rochak Kohli, Amjad Nadeem
2015	Ishqedarriyaan	1 Song- Ishqedarriyaan (Title Song),	Along with Jaidev Kumar, Bilal Saeed
2015	Hamari Adhuri Kahani	3 Songs-: Hamari Adhuri Kahani (Title Track); Hamari Adhuri Kahani (Encore); Yeh Kaisi Jagah	Also As Singer; Along with Mithoon, Ami Mishra
2016	Sanam Re	2 Songs-: Chhote Chhote Tamashe; Tum Bin	Along with Mithoon, Amaal Mallik, Epic Bhangra
2016	One Night Stand	1 Song- Le Chala	Along with Meet Bros, Tony Kakkar, Vivek Kar
2016	Sarbjit	1 Song- Dard	Along with Amaal Mallik, Tanishk Bagchi, Shail-Pritesh, Shashi Shivam
2016	Veerappan	1 Song- Mucchi Re	Along with Shaarib-Toshi
2016	Junooniyat	2 Songs-: Mujhko Barsaat Bana Lo; Tu Junooniyat	Along with Meet Bros, Ankit Tiwari, Bobby-Imran
2016	Rustom	2 songs -: Dekha Hazaro Dafaa; Dhal Jaun Main	Along with Arko, Raghav Sachar, Ankit Tiwari
2016	Raaz Reboot	6 songs-: Lo Maan Liya; Raaz Aankhen Teri; Yaad Hai Na; Hummein Tummein Jo Tha; Yaad Hai Na (Reprise); The Sound of Raaz	Along with Sangeet Haldipur-Siddharth Haldipur, Sangeet-Siddharth
2016	Ishq Junoon	2 Songs-: Ishq Junoon; Tu Hi Toh Meri Khawaishyan	As Singer Also; Along with Vardan Singh, Ankit Tiwari, Sanjeev Darshan, Anjjan Bhattacharya
2017	Ranchi Diaries	1 Song- Thoda Aur	Along with Nickk, Tony Kakkar, Bobby-Imran
2018	Phir Se...	"All Songs"	
2018	Nanu Ki Jaanu		Uncredited
2018	Parmanu: The Story of Pokhran	1 Song-"Jitni Dafa"	Along with Sachin–Jigar
2018	Jalebi	1 Song-"Mera Pyaar Tera Pyaar"	Along with Tanishk Bagchi, Javed-Mohsin, Abhishekh Mishra, Samuel–Akanksha
2018	Bhaiaji Superhit	1 Song- "Sleepy Sleepy Akhiyan"	Along with Raghav Sachar, Sanjeev-Darshan, Amjad-Nadeem, Neerraj Pathak
2019	Marudhar Express	6 songs-: Tujhse Pehle Tujhse Zyada; Tum Chal Gaye (Male); Chaasni Si; Mirza Ve (Male); Mirza Ve (Female); Tum Chal Gaye (Female)	Also As Singer; Along with Shamir Tandon
2019	Hume Tumse Pyaar Kitna	1 Song- Gehra Halka	Along with Tony Kakkar, Shabbir Ahmed, Raaj Aashoo, DJ EMENES (MB), Toshi Sabri
2019	Yaaram†	2 Songs- Kash Fir Se, Kash Fir Se" (Sad Version)	Along with Rochak Kohli, Sohail Sen, Nayeem-Shabir
2020	Hacked	1 Song- Tu Jo Mili	Along with Arko, Amjad Nadeem Aamir, Chirrantan Bhatt, Sunny and Inder Bawra
2020	Babloo Bachelor	"All Songs"	
2020	Sadak 2	5 Songs-Shukriya, Chal Tera Shukriya, Shukriya" (Reprise), Shukriya" (Rendition), Sukriya (Solo)	Along With Ankit Tiwari, Suniljeet, Samidh Mukerjee & Urvi
2020	Footfairy	All songs	
2021	Sanak	2 Songs - Suna Hai, Suna Hai (Female)	Along with Chirantan Bhatt
2022	Love Hostel	1 Song - Chali Aa	Along with Clinton Cerejo, Bianca Gomes
2023	U-Turn	2 Songs - Sajna, Sajna (Female)	Along with Arko, Sudeep Gosswami
2023	Dill Bill	1 Song - Tere Naina	Along with Kanika Kapoor & Shabbir Ahmed, RDB, Amjad Nadeem & Dhananjay Mishra, Arko
2026	Awarapan 2	1 Song - Laado	Along with Mithoon, Amaal Mallik, Akhil Sachdeva & Wasif Ahmad
TBA	Secret/Mogali Puvvu †	TBA	Hindi, Telugu
TBA	Tom, Dick and Harry Returns †	TBA	Along with Meet Bros, Ankit Tiwari

== Hindi web series discography ==
Denotes series that have not yet been released

Year	Web Series	Songs	Notes
2025	Khakee: The Bengal Chapter		

== Bengali discography ==
Denotes films that have not yet been released

Year	Film	Songs	Notes
2004	Premi	"All Songs"	Debut in Tollywood as Jeet Gannguli
2004	Bandhan	"All Songs"	
2005	Yuddho	"All Songs"	Also as Singer
2005	Shubhodrishti	"All Songs"	Along with Rabindranath Tagore
2006	Hero	"All Songs"	
2006	MLA Fatakeshto	"All Songs"	Also as Singer
2006	Refugee	"All Songs"	Also As Singer
2006	Nayak: The Real Hero	"All Songs"	
2006	Eri Naam Prem	"All Songs"	
2006	Kranti	"Prithibi Bodle Geche"	Along with Som-Samidh-Rishi, Pratul Mukherjee and Riingo Banerjee
2006	Priyotoma	"All Songs"	
2006	Ghatak	"All Songs"	
2007	Minister Fatakeshto	"All Songs"	Also as singer
2007	I Love You	"All Songs"	Along with Devi Sri Prasad
2007	Tiger		Along with Subhayu Bedajna
2008	Lal Kalo	4 Songs- Jhilmil Jhilmil, Ghanan Ghanan, Chiranga Pitty, Chhum Chhum	Animation Film; Marathi, Telugu, Hindi Languages
2008	Premer Kahini	"All Songs"	
2008	Love	"All Songs"	
2008	Chirodini Tumi Je Amar	"All Songs"	Also As Singer; Along with Chandan Sharma
2008	Bor Asbe Ekhuni	"All Songs" Except Baba Amar Ki Biye Hobe Na, Saiyaan (Slow), Saiyaan (Female), Saiyaan (Male)	Along with Indraadip Dasgupta
2008	Mon Mane Na	"All Songs"	
2009	Saat Paake Bandha	"All Songs"	Also As Singer
2009	Jackpot	"All Songs"	
2009	Challenge	"All Songs"	Also As Singer
2009	Poran Jaye Jolia Re	"All Songs"	Also As Singer
2009	Neel Akasher Chandni	"All Songs"	
2009	Keno Kichu Kotha Bolo Naa	5 Songs- Keno Kichhu Kotha Bolo Na Title Song, Maula Re Maula, Mon Bheja Mon Bheja, Jodi Jhiri Jhiri Brishtite, Dooba Dooba	
2009	Prem Aamar	"All Songs"	Also As Singer
2009	Krodh (2009 film)	5 Songs- Bhalobasa Dile, Bhule Thaka Chilo Bhalo, Jibone Aalor Disha, Oi Biyer Sanai, Ring Tone Ring Tone	
2009	Dujone	6 Songs- Kar Chokhe Chokh, Ek Tukro Hasi, Jibone Ki Pabona - Rama Ho, Dujane, Sonali Roddur, Bodhua	Also As Singer
2010	Thana Theke Aschi	"All Songs"	
2010	Bolo Na Tumi Aamar	"All Songs"	Also As Singer; Along with Yuvan Shankar Raja
2010	Target: The Final Mission	"All Songs"	Also As Singer
2010	Amanush	"All Songs"	Also As Singer
2010	Dui Prithibi	2 Songs- "Bol Naa Aar", "Dui Prithibi"	Along with Samidh-Rishi
2010	Mon Je Kore Uru Uru	"All Songs"	also as a singer
2010	Shedin Dekha Hoyechilo	"All Songs" Except Khokababu	Also As Singer; Along with Samidh-Rishi
2010	Kellafate	"All Songs"	Also As Singer
2010	Josh	"All Songs" Except Josh (Title Track), Korbo Na Biye	As Singer Also; Along with Samidh-Rishi
2011	Paglu	"All Songs"	Also As Singer
2011	Bhorer Alo	"All Songs"	Also As Singer
2011	Faande Poriya Boga Kaande Re	"All Songs" Except Jani Na, Koka Kola	Also As Singer; Along with Samidh Mukerjee
2011	Romeo	"All Songs"	Also As Singer
2011	System	6 Songs- Ei System, Alok Borsho Dure Aaj, Ferari Mon, Hente Chenashona Rastay (2), Hente Chenashona Rastay, Mahi Rey, System Theme	Also As Singer
2012	100% Love	"All Songs" Except Hiya Jole, Tum Se Pyar Hai Already	As Singer Also; Along with Samidh Mukerjee
2012	Le Halua Le	"All Songs"	Also As Singer
2012	Jaaneman	"All Songs"	Also As Singer
2012	Awara	"All Songs" Except Awara Title Song, Phool Koli	Also As Singer; Along with Dev Sen
2012	Paglu 2	"All Songs"	Also As Singer
2012	Ekla Akash	"All Songs"	Also As Singer
2012	Challenge 2	"All Songs" Except Pyaar Ka Bukhar	Along with Savvy
2012	Bapi Bari Jaa	"All Songs"	
2013	Rocky	"All Songs"	Also As Singer
2013	Boss: Born to Rule	"All Songs"	As Singer Also
2013	Rangbaaz	"All Songs"	
2014	Chirodini Tumi Je Amar 2	"All Songs"	
2014	Game: He Plays To Win	"All Songs"	
2014	Arundhati	"All Songs"	Along with Koti
2014	Bachchan	"All Songs"	Also As Singer
2015	Herogiri	"All Songs"	
2015	Besh Korechi Prem Korechi	"All Songs"	Also As Singer
2016	Ki Kore Toke Bolbo	"All Songs" Except Awaara Dil	Also As Singer; Along with Dev Sen
2016	Power	"All songs"	Also As Singer
2016	Love Express	"All songs"	Also As Singer
2017	Boss 2: Back To Rule	"All songs"	
2017	Chaamp	"All Songs" Except Dekho Dekho Chaamp, Tumio Chaamp	Along with Anupam Roy, Raftaar
2017	Dekh Kemon Lage	"All songs"	Also As Singer
2017	Jio Pagla	"All songs"	
2018	Jole Jongole	"All songs"	Also As Singer
2018	Total Dadagiri	"All songs"	Also As Singer
2018	Piya Re	4 Songs- Swapno Safar, Piya Re (Female Vocals), Aami Tor Neshate, Piya Re (Male Vocals)	Also As Singer
2018	Girlfriend	"All Songs" Except Girlfriend Title Track	Along with Rupam Islam
2018	Bagh Bandi Khela	"All songs"	Also As Singer
2019	Jamai Badal	"All songs"	
2019	Kidnap	"All songs"	
2019	Bibaho Obhijaan	"All songs"	Also As Singer
2021	Tumi Ashbe Bole	"All songs"	
2021	Baazi	"All songs"	
2021	Tonic	"All songs"	
2022	Kolkatar Harry	"All songs"	Also as a singer
2022	Toke Chhara Banchbo Na	"All songs"	
2023	Abar Bibaho Obhijaan	"All songs"	
2024	Shontaan		
2025	Sharthopor	Bhenge Jay, Ei Shon	
2025	Projapoti 2	Love You Papa, Hashli Keno Bol	
2025	Mitin: Ekti Khunir Sandhaney	Mayar Khelare, Saiyan	
2026	Shey Toh Aajo Bojhena	Title Song, Eto Alo Thekeo Andhakar	
2026	Paakhi	TBA	
2026	Shuru Theke Shuru	TBA	

== Bengali single song discography ==
Year	Songs	Co-singer(s)	Lyric(s)
2011	Suruchi Sangha Theme Song "Dushan Ete Golche Borof"	Zubeen Garg, Monali Thakur, Rana Mazumder	Chandrani Ganguli, Abhijit Sen
2011-12	"Star Jalsha Parivaar Award"	Kunal Ganjawala, Monali Thakur, Madhuraa Bhattacharya	Chandrani Ganguli, Prasen
2013	Suruchi Sangha Puja Anthem "Bangla Amar Maa"	Shreya Ghoshal, Shaan	Chandrani Ganguli, Kazi Kamal Naser
2014	Suruchi Sangha Puja Anthem "Jaago Maa"	Arijit Singh	Chandrani Ganguli
2015	Suruchi Sangha Puja Anthem "Maa Go Tumi Sarbojanin"	Shreya Ghoshal	Mamata Banerjee
2016	Suruchi Sangha Theme Song "Prithibi Ektai Desh"	Palak Muchhal	Mamata Banerjee
2016	Jayo Hey Title Track	—N/a	
2016	"Dhak Baja Kashor Baja"	Shreya Ghosal	Priyo Chatterjee
2017	Suruchi Sangha Theme Song “Boichitrer Muktoy Gantha Ekotar Monihar”	Shreya Ghoshal	Mamata Banerjee
2017	Phire Aaye (Bengali Puja Song)	Babul Supriyo	Anindya Chatterjee
2018	Bangla Cine Carnival Song	Jeet Gannguli	
2018	Joy Joy Durga Maa - The Pujo Song	Abhijeet Bhattacharya, Shaan	Priyo Chattopadhyay
2019	Suruchi Sangha Theme Song "Utsav"	Shreya Ghosal	Mamata Banerjee
2019	Elo Maa Dugga Thakur	Sonu Nigam, Monali Thakur	Priyo Chattopadhyay
2020	Bolo Dugga Maiki	Nakash Aziz, Nikhita Gandhi	Prasen
2021	Maa Go Tomar Agomone	Abhijeet Bhattacharya	Chandrani Ganguli
2023	Amaar Ganga Amaar Padma	Jeet Ganguli	Chandrani Ganguli
2023	Sunsrise Dashabhuja	Jeet Ganguli, Monali Thakur	Tanuka
2023	Scrapbook	Jeet Ganguli	Chandrani Ganguli
2024	Chokh Mele Dekho Tumi	Paushali Sahu	Chandrani Ganguli
2024	Jhinkunakur Duggathakur	PawandeepRajan, Arunita Kanjilal	Chandrani Ganguli
2024	Suruchi Sangha Theme Song	Mahalaxmi Iyer	Mamata Banerjee
2025	Jhiri Jhiri Brishti Paye	Jeet Gannguli, Arunita Kanjilal	Priyo Chattopadhyay
2025	Dugga Elo Ghore	Chandrani Gannguli, Jeet Gannguli	Chandrani Gannguli
2025	Dugga Jabe Phire	Chandrani Gannguli, Jeet Gannguli	Chandrani Gannguli

== Hindi single song discography ==
Year	Songs	Co-singer(s)	Lyric(s)
2015	Ishqedarriyaan Cover	Solo	Kauser Munir
2015	Aa Bhi Jaa Tu Kahin Se	Sonu Nigam	Manoj Muntashir
2016	Mere Papa	Tulsi Kumar	Manoj Muntashir
2016	Do Chaar Din	Rahul Vaidya, Sanjeev Chimmalgi	Manoj Muntashir
2016	Gajanan	Sukhwinder Singh	Manoj Muntashir
2016	Maiya Teri Jai Jaikaar	Arijit Singh	Manoj Muntashir
2016	Trinamool Sabse Pyara	Solo	
2017	Salaami De	Jeet Gannguli, Bob Omulo	Virag Mishra
2017	Phir Se	Amruta Fadnavis	Rashmi Virag
2018	Barsaat Mein Zee Music Originals	Solo	Rashmi Virag
2018	Tere Naal Rehna Zee Music Originals	Jyotica Tangri	Kumaar
2018	Koi Karega Na Tumse Pyaar Zee Music Originals	Solo	Rashmi Virag
2018	Theher Jao Na Zee Music Originals	Aakanksha Sharma	Rashmi Virag
2018	Betuki Si Zee Music Originals	Solo	Anvita Dutt Guptan
2018	Koi Karega Na Tumse Pyaar Zee Music Originals	Deepshikha Raina	Rashmi Virag
2019	Neeinden Zee Music Originals	Sonal Pradhan	Rashmi Virag
2019	Gungunati Rehti Hoon Zee Music Originals	Palak Muchhal, Yasser Desai	Rashmi Virag
2019	Kyu Saath Tumhara Choota Hai Zee Music Originals	Sonu Kakkar	Kumar Vishwas
2020	Ud Aao {Anthem of CoP13 for United Nations Conference on Conservation of Migratory Species (CMS)}	Babul Supriyo	Prasoon Joshi
2020	Ek Baat Hai Zee Music Originals	Payal Dev	Kunaal Vermaa
2020	Ae Mere Dil VYRL Originals	Abhay Jodhpurkar	Manoj Muntashir
2021	Lag Raha Hai Dil DeewanaZee Music Originals	Palak Muchhal	Manoj Yadav
2021	Kaise Hum Bataye Zee Music Originals	Nikhita Gandhi	Rashmi Virag
2021	Chale Aatein Hai Zee Music Originals	Raj Barman	Rashmi Virag
2021	Humko Toh Pyaar Hogaya Zee Music Originals	Raj Barman	Rashmi Virag
2021	Nainon Ka Ye Rona Jaaye Na Zee Music Originals	Raj Barman	Manoj Yadav
2021	Mohabbat Hai VYRL Originals	Stebin Ben	Kunaal Vermaa
2022	Chehre Pe Tere Zee Music Originals	Raj Barman	Kumaar
2022	Ishq Badhta Gaya	Pawandeep Rajan	Rashmi Virag
2022	Jaan Liya Re Zee Music Originals	Palak Muchhal	Manoj Yadav
2023	Mangal Karta	Solo	Kaushal Kishore
2023	Le Aa	Palak Muchhal	Kaushal Kishore, Chandrani Ganguli
2023	Wajah	Amarjeet Jaikar	Kaushal Kishore
2023	Aao Na	Solo	TNT Tripurari Nath Tiwari
2023	Iss Dil Ko	Pawandeep Rajan, Arunita Kanjilal	Manoj Ramprasadr
2023	Naina Mere Naina	Ranita Banerjee	Chandrani Ganguli
2023	Kitne Bulbule	Neha Karode	Neha Karode
2023	Zara Sa Paas	Amarjeet Jaikar	Amarjeet Jaikar
2023	Kahin Na Kahin	Pawandeep Rajan	Rashmi Virag
2024
2024	Jai Shree Radhe Krishna	Solo	
2024	Ruki Ruki Si	Abhay Jodhpurkar	Jeet Gannguli
2024	Bawra Mann	Ranita Banerjee	Manoj Ramprasadr
2024	Jhilmilate Hue Zee Music Originals	Raj Barman	Aalok Shrivastav
2024	O Heeriye Zee Music Originals	Raj Barman	Rashmi Virag
2024	Om Namah Shivay	Solo	
2024	Teri Intezariyaan Zee Music Originals	Senjuti Das	Dinesh Bhoyar
2024	Chhupan Chhupai	Neha Karode, Raj Barman	Neha Karode
2024	Teri Yaadon Mein	Amarjeet Jaikar	Manoj Ramprasadr
2024	Bolo Zara	Ranita Banerjee	Manoj Ramprasadr
2024	Naina Yeh Chaahe Zee Music Originals	Raj Barman	Manoj Ramprasadr
2024	Tere Pyaar Mein Rehne De Zee Music Originals	Raj Barman	Syed Jilani
2024	Zindagi Na Mile Dobara Zee Music Originals	Rohit Dubey	Manoj Ramprasadr
2024	Sochta Hoon Zee Music Originals	Raj Barman	Aalok Shrivastav
2024	Shiv Shambhu	Hariharan	Ashish Singh
2024	Ye Zindagi	Hariharan	Chandrani Ganguli
2025	O Re Baanware	Arunita Kanjilal, Jeet Gannguli	Rashmi Virag
2025	Meri Maa	Jeet Gannguli	Chandrani Ganguli
2025	Barkha Ki Rut Aayi	Dev Rathour	Tanveer Ghazii
2025	Aye Khuda	Jeet Gannguli	Tanveer Ghazii
2025	Tu Aaye Na	Ranita Banerjee, Jeet Gannguli	Tanveer Ghazii

== Hindi serial discography ==
Year	Serials	Singers	Songs	Lyricist	Channel	Notes
2000	Choodiyan	Sonu Nigam			Sony	Along with Pritam
2002	Kyun Hota Hai Pyarr	Shaan & Sunidhi Chauhan			Star Plus	Along with Pritam
2007	Meri Awaz Ko Mil Gayi Roshni	Gayatri Iyer, Mahalakshmi Iyer & Hamsika Iyer		Nida Fazli	Star Plus	
2011	Meri Maa	Madhuraa Bhattacharya (Nilakshi)	Title Track	Sanjeev Tiwari	Life Ok	
2015	IMFFA Suron Ke Rang Colors Ke Sang				Viacom 18	
2016	Naagarjuna – Ek Yoddha	Palak Muchhal & Jubin Nautiyal	Toh Chal Ud Jaye		Life Ok	
2016	Naagarjuna – Ek Yoddha	Sonu Nigam	Kaise Ye Paheli Kya Pata		Life Ok	
2016	Naamkarann	Palak Muchhal, Sneha Shankar	Aa Leke Chalu Tujhko	Vijay Vijawatt	Star Plus	

== Bengali serial discography ==
Gannguli worked in these Bengali serials.

Year	Serials	Songs	Singers	Lyricist	Channel
2008	Ekhane Aakash Neel	Title Track	Monali Thakur		Star Jalsha
2008	Durga (TV series)	Title Track	Chorus		Star Jalsha
2009	Maa....Tomay Chara Ghum Ashena	Title Track	Madhuraa Bhattacharya (Nilakshi)	Priyo Chottopadhyay	Star Jalsha
2010	Ek Poloke Ektu Dekha	Title Track	Monali Thakur	Joy Sarkar	Ruposhi Bangla
2017	Jamai Raja (Bengali TV Serial)	Title Track	Sayam Paul		Zee Bangla
2018	Om Namah Shivay	Title Track	Madhuraa Bhattacharya (Nilakshi), Nachiketa Chakraborty		Star Jalsha
2019	Mahapeeth Tarapeeth	Title Track	Shreya Ghoshal		Star Jalsha
2019	Star Jalsha Theme Song	Chalo Paltai	Jonita Gandhi		Star Jalsha
2019	Ekhane Aakash Neel Season 2	Title Track	Monali Thakur	TBA	Star Jalsha
2022	Nabab Nandini (Bengali TV Serial)	Title Track	Shaan & Palak Muchhal		Star Jalsha

== Commercial ad discography ==
Year	Commercials	Singers	Songs	Featuring
2015	Ponds	Monali Thakur Jeet Gannguli	Googly Woogly Wooksh Ft. Dilwale	Monali Thakur, Jeet Gannguli
2016	Ponds	Monali Thakur Armaan Malik	9xm Pond's Present's Googly Woogly Wooksh	Monali Thakur, Armaan Malik
