= Monali Thakur discography =

List of songs recorded by Monali Thakur (Indian singer)

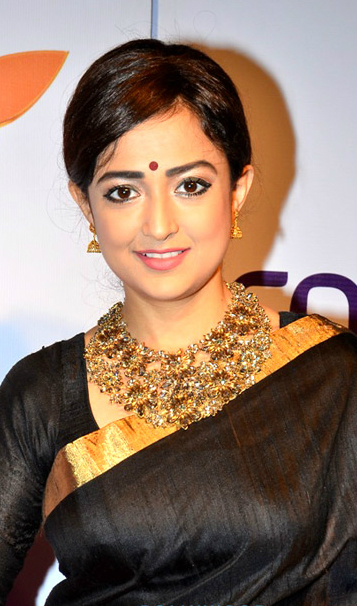
- Monali Thakur at the Kelvinator Stree Shakti Women Awards 2014
- Hindi songs: 71
- Non-film songs: 26
- Non-Hindi film songs: 50
- Total: 147

Monali Thakur is an Indian playback singer in different languages including Hindi, Bengali, Tamil, and Kannada. This article lists songs recorded by Monali Thakur.

== Hindi film songs ==
Denotes films that have not yet been released

Year	Film	Song	Music	Lyrics	Co-singer(s)	Note
2006	Jaan-E-Mann	"Kubool Kar Le"	Anu Malik	Gulzar	Udit Narayan, Rahul Vaidya, Amit Sana, Prajakta Shukre, Suzanne D'Mello	Debut
2008	Dil Kabaddi	"Goodnight"	Sachin Gupta	Virag Mishra	Poroma Banerji, Jaspreet Singh	
2008	Race	"Zara Zara Touch Me"	Pritam	Sameer	Earl Edgar, Pritam	
2008	Race	"Zara Zara Touch Me" (Asian RnB Remix)	Pritam	Sameer	Earl Edgar, Pritam	
2008	Race	"Zara Zara Touch Me" (Remix)	Pritam	Sameer	Earl Edgar, Pritam	
2008	Race	"Khwaab Dekhe (Sexy Lady)"	Pritam	Sameer	Pritam, Neeraj Shridhar,	
2008	Golmaal Returns	"Meow"	Pritam	Sameer	Suzanne D'Mello	
2009	New York	"Hai Junoon" (Remix)	Pritam	Sandeep Shrivastava	KK	
2009	Billu	"Khudaya Khair"	Pritam	Gulzar	Soham Chakraborty, Akriti Kakar	
2009	Bolo Raam	"Do Dil Hain Janwa"	Sachin Gupta	Ajay Jhingran	Soham Chakrabarty	
2010	Dulha Mil Gaya	"Dilrubaon Ke Jalwe"	Lalit Pandit	Kumaar	Amit Kumar	
2010	Prince	"Ishq Mein"	Sandeep Shirodkar	Sameer		
2010	Badmaash Company	"Jingle Jingle"	Pritam	Anvita Dutt Guptan	Mohit Chauhan, Master Saleem	
2010	Golmaal 3	"Golmaal"	Pritam	Kumaar	K.K., Anushka Manchanda	
2010	Golmaal 3	"Golmaal (Remix)"	Pritam	Kumaar	K.K., Anushka Manchanda	
2010	Anjaana Anjaani	"Anjaana Anjaani Ki Kahani"	Vishal–Shekhar	Neelesh Misra	Nikhil D'Souza	
2011	Kucch Luv Jaisaa	"Naina"	Pritam	Irshad Kamil	Mohit Chauhan	
2011	Tum Hi To Ho	"Aao Manaye Jashn"	Anand–Milind	Ravi Chopra	Rahul Seth	
2011	Rascals	"Tik Tuk"	Vishal–Shekhar	Irshad Kamil	Daler Mehndi, Vishal Dadlani	
2011	Hostel	"Rishta Banao"	Virag Mishra		Raaj	
2011	Bbuddah... Hoga Terra Baap	"Haal-E-Dil	Vishal–Shekhar	Swanand Kirkire, Anvita Dutt Guptan	Amitabh Bachchan	
2011	United Six	"Give It Up"	Pritam	Ashish Pandit	Suzanne D'Mello	
2012	Tere Naal Love Ho Gaya	"Tu Mohabbat Hai"	Sachin–Jigar	Priya Panchal	Atif Aslam, Priya Saraiya	
2012	From Sydney with Love	"Ho Jaayega"	Sohail Sen	Anvita Dutt Guptan	Mohit Chauhan	
2012	From Sydney with Love	"Ho Jaayega" (Remix)	Sohail Sen	Anvita Dutt Guptan	Mohit Chauhan	
2012	Mr. Bhatti on Chutti		Channi Singh			
2012	Aiyyaa	"Aga Bai"	Amit Trivedi	Amitabh Bhattacharya	Shalmali Kholgade	
2012	Kamaal Dhamaal Malamaal	"Dariya Ho"	Sajid–Wajid	Jalees Sherwani	Shadaab Faridi	
2012	Jo Hum Chahein	"Peepni"	Sachin Gupta	Kumaar	Jaspreet Singh	
2012	Qasam Se Qasam Se	"Mumkin Nahi"	Sayanthi–Shailendra	Mouazzam Azam	Kunal Ganjawala	
2012	Will You Marry Me?	"Tu Ru Tu Ru Tu"	Sachin Gupta			
2013	Inkaar	"Inkaar" (Theme)	Shantanu Moitra	Swanand Kirkire		
2013	Madras Cafe	"Conspiracy"	Shantanu Moitra			
2013	Anwar Ka Ajab Kissa	"Muskurah"	Alokananda Dasgupta	Rajeshwari Dasgupta Ghose		
2013	I, Me Aur Main	"Darbadar"	Sachin–Jigar	Mayur Puri		
2013	I, Me Aur Main	"Meri Jaaniye"	Gourov Dasgupta	Manthan	Shaan	
2013	Hum Hai Raahi Car Ke	"Nachlay Nachlay"	Sangeet-Siddharth	Sreekant Agneeaswaran	Shaan	
2013	Ramaiya Vastavaiya	"Hip Hop Pammi"	Sachin–Jigar	Priya Saraiya	Mika Singh	
2013	Lootera	"Sawar Loon"	Amit Trivedi	Amitabh Bhattacharya		
2013	Rabba Main Kya Karoon	"Muh Meetha Kara De"	Salim–Sulaiman	Amitabh Bhattacharya	Benny Dayal	
2013	I Don't Luv U	"I Don't Luv U"	Aman Benson & Amit Kasaria	Pallavi Mishra	Neuman Pinto	
2013	Nasha	"Laila"	Sangeet-Siddharth	Radhika Anand		
2013	Krrish 3	"Raghupati Raghav"	Rajesh Roshan	Sameer	Neeraj Shridhar, Bob	
2014	Gunday	"Tune Maari Entriyaan" (Bangla Version)	Sohail Sen	Bappi Lahiri, Gautam Susmit	Bappi Lahiri	
2014	Yaariyan	"Love Me Thoda Aur"	Pritam	Irshad Kamil	Arijit Singh, Nikhil D'Souza	
2014	Bobby Jasoos	"Sweety"	Shantanu Moitra	Swanand Kirkire	Aishwarya Nigam	
2014	Lakshmi	"Aa Ghar Chalein Hum"	Tapas Relia	Manoj Yadav		
2014	Karle Pyaar Karle	"Karle Pyaar Karle"	Meet Bros Anjjan	Kumaar	Benny Dayal, Palak Muchhal	
2015	Hawaizaada	"Turram Khan"	Rochak Kohli	Vibhu Puri	Papon, Ayushmann Khurrana	
2015	Dum Laga Ke Haisha	"Moh Moh Ke Dhaage"	Anu Malik	Varun Grover		
2015	Ek Paheli Leela	"Dhol Baaje"	Meet Bros Anjjan	Kumaar	Meet Bros Anjjan	
2016	Saala Khadoos	"Dil Ye Ladaku"	Santhosh Narayanan	Swanand Kirkire		
2016	Baaghi	"Cham Cham"	Meet Bros	Kumaar	Meet Bros	
2016	Yea Toh Two Much Ho Gayaa	"Chappan Taal"	Abhishekh Majumder	Jairaj Selvan, Vishal V. Patil	Nakash Aziz	
2016	Dhanak	"Dhanak" (Title song)	Tapas Relia	Ali Mir Hussain		
2016	Awesome Mausam	"Laila Majnu"	Javed Ali	Yogesh Bhardwaj	Javed Ali	
2016	Mumbai 125 KM	"Saazish"	Mani Sharma	Kumaar		
2017	Badrinath Ki Dulhania	"Badri Ki Dulhania"	Tanishk Bagchi		Dev Negi, Neha Kakkar, Ikka	
2017	Meri Pyaari Bindu	"Khol De Baahein"	Sachin–Jigar	Shabbir Ahmed		
2017	Monsoon Shootout	"Miliyo Re"	Rochak Kohli	Deepak Ramola	Rochak Kohli	
2017	Indu Sarkar	"Yeh Awaaz Hai"	Anu Malik	Puneet Sharma		
2018	Phir Se...	"Yeh Dil Jo Hai Badmaash Hai"	Jeet Gannguli	Rashmi Virag	Mohit Chauhan, Shreya Ghoshal	
2018	October	"Chal"	Shantanu Moitra	Swanand Kirkire		
2018	Fanney Khan	"Tere Jaisa Tu Hai"	Amit Trivedi	Irshad Kamil		
2018	Fanney Khan	"Fu Bai Fu"	Amit Trivedi	Irshad Kamil		
2018	Gold	"Monobina"	Tanishk Bagchi	Vayu	Yasser Desai, Shashaa Tirupati, Farhad Bhiwandiwala	
2019	Jabariya Jodi	"Zilla Hilela"	Tanishk Bagchi	Shabbir Ahmed, Tanishk Bagchi	Dev Negi, Raja Hassan, Pravesh Mallick	
2019	Aladdin	"Naya Jahan" (A Whole New World)	Alan Menken	Irshad Kamil	Armaan Malik	Hindi Dub Version
2019	Aladdin	"Speechless (Part 1)"	Alan Menken			Hindi Dub Version
2019	Aladdin	"Speechless (Part 2)"	Alan Menken			Hindi Dub Version
2019	Pal Pal Dil Ke Paas	"Ho Jaa Awara"	Tanishk Bagchi	Siddharth-Garima	Ash King	
2020	Shakuntala Devi	"Jhilmil Piya"	Sachin–Jigar	Priya Saraiya	Benny Dayal	Amazon Prime Video film
2020	Coolie No. 1	"Mummy Kasam"	Tanishk Bagchi	Shabbir Ahmed, Ikka	Udit Narayan, Ikka	Amazon Prime Video film
2022	Chakki	"Aankhein Judi"	Rahul Ram	Varun Grover	Papon	
2022	Shabaash Mithu	"Woh Galliyan"	Amit Trivedi	Kausar Munir	Shashwat Singh	
2023	Tiku Weds Sheru	"Tera Intezar (Female)"	Gaurav Chatterji, Sai Kabir	Sai Kabir		Amazon Prime Video film
2023	Satyaprem Ki Katha	"Raat Baki"	Meet Bros	Kumaar	Meet Bros, Piyush Mehroliyaa	
2024	Maharaj	"Haan Ke Haan"	Sohail Sen	Kausar Munir		Netflix Film

== Bengali film songs ==
†	Denotes films that have not yet been released

Year	Film	Song	Music	Lyrics	Co-singer(s)	Note
1999	Cheka Achena	"Choi Choi Choi Tipi Tipi"	Anupam Dutta	Pulak Bandyopadhyay		Debut
2000	Sajoni Aamar Sohag	"Sundar Kato Sundar"	Anupam Dutta	Pulak Bandyopadhyay	Kavita Krishnamurti, Goutam Ghose and Pratik Choudhary	
2008	Dujone	"Bodhua"	Jeet Gannguli	Priyo Chatterjee	Zubeen Garg	
2008	Dujone	"Kar Chokhe"	Jeet Gannguli	Gautam Sushmit	Zubeen Garg	
2008	Dujone	"Sonali Rodudure"	Jeet Gannguli	Gautam Sushmit	Shaan	
2008	Love	"Prithibi Onek Boro"	Jeet Gannguli	Gautam Sushmit	Dibyendu Mukherjee	
2008	Love	"Kalke Chilam Jajabar"	Jeet Gannguli	Gautam Sushmit	Saptak Bhattacharjee	
2009	Lakshyabhed	"Elore Elo Holi Elo"	Kalyan Sen Barat	Raj Mukherjee	Rupankar Bagchi, Kuntal	
2009	Lakshyabhed	"Habibi India"	Kalyan Sen Barat	Gautam Sushmit	Shubhankar Bhaskar, Babul Supriyo, Jiniya Roy	
2010	Dui Prithibi	"It's Only Pyar"	Samidh-Rishi	Samidh Mukerjee	Kunal Ganjawala	
2010	Dui Prithibi	"O Yaara Ve"	Jeet Gannguli	Prasen (Prasenjit Mukherjee)	Kunal Ganjawala, Bonnie Chakraborty, June Banerjee,	
2010	Dui Prithibi	"Bol Na Aar"	Jeet Gannguli	Prasen (Prasenjit Mukherjee)	Shaan	
2010	Mon Je Kore Uru Uru	"My Heart"	Jeet Gannguli	Chandrani Gannguli	Jeet Gannguli	
2010	Kellafate	"Jibon Jr Mela Re Bhai"	Jeet Gannguli	Priyo Chattopadhyay	Jeet Gannguli	
2010	Kellafate	"Lal Gaanda Phool"	Jeet Gannguli	Priyo Chattopadhyay		
2010	Kellafate	"Premer Gale Chuma De"	Jeet Gannguli	Prasen (Prasenjit Mukherjee)	Abhijeet Bhattacharya	
2010	Bolo Na Tumi Aamar	"Bolo Na Tumi Aamar"	Jeet Gannguli	Gautam Sushmit	Jeet Gannguli	
2010	Bolo Na Tumi Aamar	"Hate You"	Jeet Gannguli	Priyo Chattopadhyay	Babul Supriyo	
2010	Josh	"Keu Mone Mone"	Jeet Gannguli	Prasen (Prasenjit Mukherjee)	Shaan, Pamela Jain	
2010	Le Chakka	"Shabba Rabba Reeba Ru"	Indradip Dasgupta	Priyo Chattopadhyay, Prasenjit Mukherjee, Srijato	Kunal Ganjawala	
2011	Jaani Dyakha Hawbe	"Thik Thakish"	Indradeep Dasgupta	Srijato	Anupam Roy	
2011	Fighter	"Ke Se"	Indradeep Dasgupta	Goutam Susmit, Priyo Chatterjee, Prasen	Shaan	
2011	Fighter	"Oh Sona Eshona"	Indradeep Dasgupta	Goutam Susmit, Priyo Chatterjee, Prasen	Kunal Ganjawala	
2011	Fighter	"Mon Banjara"	Indradeep Dasgupta	Goutam Susmit, Priyo Chatterjee, Prasen	Kunal Ganjawala	
2011	Romeo	"Eta Ki Bhul"	Jeet Gannguli	Prasen (Prasenjit Mukherjee)	Shaan	
2011	Faande Poriya Boga Kaande Re	"Jani Na"	Samidh Mukerjee		Kunal Ganjawala	
2011	Faande Poriya Boga Kaande Re	"Akasher Nile"	Jeet Gannguli	Prasen (Prasenjit Mukherjee)	Shaan	
2011	Bhorer Alo	"Give Me Freedom"	Jeet Gannguli	Priyo Chattopadhyay	Shaan	
2011	Tomay Bhalobashye	"Happy Birthday "	Anand–Milind	Goutom		
2012	Aparajita Tumi	"Shadow Tales "	Shantanu Moitra	Anindya Chatterjee, Chandril Bhattacharya, Neha Rungta	Suraj Jagan	
2012	Le Halua Le	"Darlling Oh My Darling"	Jeet Gannguli	Raja Chanda	Jeet Gannguli	
2012	Bapi Bari Ja	"Chaap Nish Na"	Jeet Gannguli	Anindya Chatterjee	Shaan	
2012	Macho Mastana	"Rukega Badal"	Samidh Mukerjee	Samidh Mukerjee, Gautam Sushmit	Samidh Mukerjee	
2012	3 Kanya	"Golemale Pirit Koro Na"	Indradeep Dasgupta	Srijato	Arijit Singh	
2012	100% Love	"It's 100% Love"	Jeet Gannguli	Raja Chanda	Jeet Gannguli	
2013	Rangbaaz	"Oh Madhu"	Jeet Gannguli	Raja Chanda	Benny Dayal	
2013	Rangbaaz	"Love You Soniyo"	Jeet Gannguli	Prosen	Zubeen Garg	
2013	Loveria	"O Shona "	Samidh Mukerjee			
2013	Boss: Born to Rule	"Ichhe Joto Uriye Debo"	Jeet Gannguli	Chandrani Gannguli	Arijit Singh	
2013	Hanuman.com	"Joto Dur Jabe Chhokh "	Indradeep Dasgupta	Srijato	Anupam Roy	
2014	Gunday (Bengali)	"Tune Maari Entriyaan" (Bangla Version)	Sohail Sen	Bappi Lahiri, Gautam Sushmit	Bappi Lahiri	
2014	Arundhati	"He Naropishach"	Jeet Gannguli, Koti	Chandrani Gannguli		
2014	Golpo Holeo Shotti	"Ei Bhalo Ei Kharap"	Indradeep Dasgupta	Prasen	Arijit Singh	
2015	Parbona Ami Chartey Tokey	"Ure Geche"	Indradeep Dasgupta	Prasen	Ash King	
2015	Parbona Ami Chartey Tokey	"Tumi Ashe Paashe"	Indradeep Dasgupta	Prasen	Nakash Aziz	
2015	Black	"Kono Ek Nilchee Pari"	Rajputra	Raj Chanda	Hridoy Khan	
2015	Love in Rajasthan	"Love In Rajasthan"	Babul Bose	Shyamal Sengupta	Kunal Ganjawala	
2016	Power	"Chakum Chukum"	Jeet Gannguli	Raj Chanda	Jeet Gannguli	
2017	Jio Pagla	"Jio Pagla" (Title Track)	Jeet Gannguli	Prasenjit Malick	Benny Dayal	
2017	Jio Pagla	"Hawai Hawai"	Jeet Gannguli	Prasenjit Malick	Dev Negi	
2018	Jole Jongole	"Ei Mon"	Jeet Gannguli	Priyo Chattopadhyay	Shaan	
2018	Ghare & Baire	"Tara Khoshe Pore"	Anupam Roy			
2018	Ami Neta Hobo	"I'm in Love"	Ahamed Humaun	Sudeep Kumar Deep	Shaan	
2019	Shahjahan Regency	"Bolo Na Radhika"	Prasen (Prasenjit Mukherjee)	Ritam Sen		
2021	Ei Ami Renu	"Chup Kore Tui"	Rana Mazumdar		Ash King	
2022	Paka Dekha	"Tumi Daak Naam Dile"	Jeet Gannguli	Srijato	Shaan	

== Film songs in other regional languages ==
†	Denotes films that have not yet been released

Year	Film	Song	Music	Lyrics	Co-singer(s)	Language
2013	Madha Yaanai Koottam	"Yaro Yaro"	N. R. Raghunanthan	Yegathasi	Haricharan	Tamil
2017	Vardhana	"Soojiga Nanava"	Methews Manu		Santish Venky	Kannada
2018	60 Vayadu Maaniram	"Naalum Naalum I"	Ilaiyaraaja	Vivek		Tamil
2018	60 Vayadu Maaniram	"Naalum Naalum II"	Ilaiyaraaja	Vivek	Benny Dayal	Tamil
2026	Adkitta	"Chandawa"	Hrishikesh Datar	Kshitij Patwardhan		Marathi

== Non-film songs ==
Denotes films that have not yet been released

Year	Album/Single	Song	Composer	Co-singer(s)	Note
2006	Indian Idol 2	Woh Pehli Bar		Antara Mitra, Amey Date, N.C. Karunya, Meenal Jain, Neha Kakkar, Sagar Sawarkar, Sandeep Acharya, Panna Gill, Ravi Tripathi	Season 2 theme song
2008	Ekhane Aakash Neel	"Ekhane Aakash Neel - Title Track"	Jeet Gannguli		Bangla Serial
2010	Ek Poloke Ektu Dekha	"Ek Poloke Ektu - Title Track"	Jeet Gannguli		Bangla Serial
2011-12	Star Jalsha Parivaar Awards	"Star Jalsha Parivaar Awards - Title Track"	Jeet Gannguli	Jeet Gannguli, Kunal Ganjawala, Madhuraa Bhattacharya	Award Show
2012	Coke Studio Season 2	"Shedding Skin"	Karsh Kale	Karsh Kale, Shilpa Rao, Shruti Pathak, Apeksha Dandekar	MTV
2012	Coke Studio Season 2	"Dil Cheez"	Khayyam (recreated by Karsh Kale)		MTV; remake of "Dil Cheez Kya Hai" from the film Umrao Jaan, originally performed by Asha Bhosle
2013	Animal Planet India	"Ye Mera India Anthem"	Lesle Lewis	Shaan	
2015	Animal Planet India	"Ye Mera India Anthem"	Salim–Sulaiman	Neeti Mohan, Salim Merchant	
2015	Pond's Cream advertisements	"Googly Woogly Wooksh"	Jeet Gannguli	Jeet Gannguli	Commercial Ad
2016	Pond's Cream advertisements	"Googly Woogly Wooksh Reloaded"	Jeet Gannguli	Armaan Malik	Commercial Ad
2016	Naamkarann	"Naamkarann" Title Track	Anu Malik		Hindi Serial
2017	Sakhya Re	"Sakhya Re" Title Track	Pankaj Padghan		Marathi Serial
2017	Shell #makethefuture campaign	"On Top of the World"	Jennifer Hudson, Pixie Lott, Luan Santana, Yemi Alade, Monali Thakur	Jennifer Hudson, Pixie Lott, Luan Santana, Yemi Alade	
2017	PC Chandra Jewellery	"P.C Chandra Jewellery Theme Song"	Anupam Roy	Solo	Commercial Ad
2018	Tamanna - Single	"Tamanna"	Herself		YouTube; Producer-Bert Eliot, Written by Amitabh Bhattacharya
2018	Shy Mora Saiyaan - Single	"Shy Mora Saiyaan"	Meet Bros	Piyush Mehroliyaa	Mb Music
2018	"Zee5" Lockdown	"Jiya Jale"	Mickey Singh		
2018	"Zee5" Lockdown	"Gur Nalon Ishq Meetha"	Mickey Singh		
2019	O Re Naseeba - Single	"O Re Naseeba"	Sanjeev-Ajay		Eros Now
2019	Star Jalsha	"Jalsa 10e 10"	Jeet Gannguli		
2019	Sufiyana Pyaar Mera	"Ishq Sufiyana"	Wajid Khan	Javed Ali, Shabab Sabri	
2019	House of IshQ	"Kare Naina"	Ishq Bector		POP
2019	Pani Pani Re (Rewind Version) - Single	"Pani Pani Re (Rewind Version)"	Vishal Bharadwaj		Sony Music; remake of "Pani Pani Re" from the film Maachis, originally performed by Lata Mangeshkar
2019	Swachh Bharat Anthem	"Swachhta Adhikar Hai"	Saach Bharat Mission	Kailash Kher	
2019	Dugga Elo - Single	"Dugga Elo"	Guddu		Zee Music Company
2020	Jana Mana Gana	"Jana Gana Mana" (Cover)			YouTube, cover of the Indian national anthem
2020	Guzar Jayega	"Guzar Jayega"	Varun Prabhudayal Gupta	Anoop Jalota, Sonu Nigam, Shaan, Shreya Ghoshal, Dr. Jaspinder Narula, Richa Sharma, Hans Raj Hans, Kailash Kher, Javed Ali, Bapul Supriyo, Malini Awasthi, Jeet Ganguly, Jasbir Jassi, Arko Pravo Mukherjee, Shashaa Tirupati, Osman Mir, Shilpa Rao, Jyoti Nooran, Raghu Dixit, Dhvani Bhanushali, Asees Kaur, Shruti Pathak, Akriti Kakar, Anusha Mani, Bhoomi Trivedi, Abhay Jodhpurkar, Nikita Gandhi, Amit Mishra, Sukriti Kakar, Prakriti Kakar, Meghna Mishra, Himani Kapoor, Pratibha Singh Baghel, Sayani Gupta, Akhil Sachdeva, Jazim Sharma, Vipin Aneja, Bhavya Pandit, Devendra Pal Singh, Gayatri Asokan, Kumar Sharma, Priya Mallik, Rahul Mukherjee, Ragini Tandan, Rashmeet Kaur, Romi, Shreya Sharma, Simran Chaudhry, Sumedha Karmahe	An Initiative by Indian Artists - Project of Hope
2020	Dil Ka Fitoor - Single	"Dil Ka Fitoor"	Kaushik-Guddu		YouTube
2020	Doublemint Freshtake Season 1	"Aaina"	Ranajoy Bhattacharya		
2020	Elo Maa Dugga Thakur	"Elo Maa Dugga Thakur"	Jeet Gannguli	Sonu Nigam, Jeet Gannguli	
2023	Star Jalsha Parivaar Awards 2023	"Star Jalsha Parivaar Awards 2023 Theme Song"	TBA		
