= List of Indian Bengali films of 2010 =

This is a list of films produced by Tollywood (Bengali language film industry) based in Kolkata in 2010.

== A-Z of films ==
Title	Director	Cast	Genre	Notes
033	Birsa Dasgupta	Swastika Mukherjee, Sabyasachi Chakrabarty, Rudranil Ghosh	Drama	
Aahuti	Jagannath Chattopadhyay	Arun Bandyopadhyay, Biplab Chatterjee	Drama	
Aarohan	Pinaki Choudhury	Soumitra Chatterjee, Sandhya Roy, Rituparna Sengupta	Romance	
Abohomaan	Rituparno Ghosh	Deepankar De, Jisshu Sengupta	Drama	
Achin Pakhi	Anjan Das	Subrat Dutt, Manali Dey	Romance	
Aleyaa	Manas Basu	Amitava Bhattacharya, Sakuntala Barua	Drama	
Amanush	Rajib Biswas	Soham Chakrabarty (Bittu), Srabanti Chatterjee (Biswas)	Romance, thriller	
Amar Sathi	Gobindadeb Krishna Haldar	Karan, Pamela, Dipankar De	Romance	
Antar Dahon	Dr. Pramod Pandey	Oishani, Pramod	Romance	
Antim Swash Sundar	Kris Alin	Subrat Dutt, Indrani Halder	Romance	
Arekti Premer Golpo	Kaushik Ganguly	Rituparno Ghosh, Indraneil Sengupta, Jisshu Sengupta, Raima Sen	Drama	
Autograph	Srijit Mukherji	Prasenjit Chatterjee, Nandana Sen, Indraneil Sengupta, Sohini Paul	Drama	
Banshiwala	Anjan Das	Soumitra Chatterjee, Indrani Haldar, Shayan Munshi	Romance	
Besh Korechhi Prem Korechhi	Narayan Ray	Sayak, Swarna Kamal Dutta	Romance	
Bhoot	Sanghamitra Chowdhury	Arpita Mukherjee, Drron Mukherjee	Horror	
Bodhisattva	San Banarje	Soumitra Chatterjee, Trisha Ray	Drama	
Bolidaan	Tutul Banerjee	Deba, Rikta	Drama	
Bolo Na Tumi Aamar	Sujit Mondol	Dev (Bengali actor), Koyel Mullick, Sabyasachi Chakrabarty	Romance	
Bondhu Eso Tumi	Parthasarathi Joarddar	Sujoy Ghosh, Tanusree	Romance	
Bondhu Tomar	Arup Kumar Dey	Manoj, Sudipta	Romance	
Byomkesh Bakshi	Anjan Dutt	Abir Chatterjee, Saswata Chatterjee, Rudranil Ghosh	Detective	
Bor Bou Khela	Jagannath Guha	Rahul, Priyanka Sarkar	Romance	
Clerk	Subhadro Choudhury	Prasenjit Chatterjee	Fantasy	
Didibhai	Tutul Banerjee	Deba, Piu	Drama	
Dui Prithibi	Raj Chakraborty	Dev (Bengali actor), Koyel Mullick, Jeet (actor)	Romance	
Ei Mon Tomake Dilam	Tapas Dutta	Ishan, Nabomita	Romance	
Ekbar Bolo Bhalobashi	Rajsekhar Bose	Samrat Chakrabarti, Moubani Sarkar	Romance	
Eka Eka	Tapas Majumdar	-	Romance	
Ekti Tarar Khonje	Abhik Mukhopadhyay	Dhritiman Chatterjee, Shayan Munshi, Arpita Pal (Chatterjee)	Drama	
Ek Tukro Chand	Pinaki Chowdhury	Sabyasachi Chakrabarty, Soham Chakraborty (Bittu)	Drama	
Gaj Ukiler Hatya Rahasya	Kingshuk Dey	Premangshu, Abiskar	Thriller	
Game	Sudipto Ghatak, Ajay Singh	Sabyasachi Chakrabarty, Victor Banerjee	Thriller	
Gandu	Quashiq mukherjee	Anubrata, Joyraj, Kamalika, Shilajit, Rii	Drama	
Ganyer Meye Sovona	Amit Chakraborty	Bhaskar Bandyopadhyay, Mitali Chakraborty	Drama	
Ghar Sansar	Swapan Saha	Arindam Ganguly, Anjana Bose	Drama	
Gorosthaney Sabdhan	Sandip Ray	Sabyasachi Chakrabarty, Saheb Bhattacharya, Bibhu Chakraborty	Thriller	
Gudly	Arabinda Ghosh	Chiranjeet, Sumitra Mukhopadhyay	Thriller	
Handa and Bhonda	Subhankar Chattopadhyay	Supriya Devi, Mithun Chakraborty, Aritra Dutta Banik	Children	
Hangover	Prabhat Roy	Prasenjit Chatterjee	Romance	
Hing Ting Chhot	Anasua Roy Chowdhury	Soumitra Chatterjee, Madhabi Mukherjee, Rajatava Dutta	Drama	
The Japanese Wife	Aparna Sen	Rahul Bose, Chigusa Takaku, Raima Sen, Moushumi Chatterjee	Romance	
Je Aachho Antarey Antarbaas	Late Suhasis Chatterjee	Soumitra Chatterjee, Lily Chakraborty, Chiranjeet	Drama	
Jodi Ekdin	Riingo Banerjee	Indraneil Sengupta, Priyanka Sarkar, Saheb Chatterjee	Drama	
Jor Jar Muluk Tar	Haranath Chakraborty	Prasenjit Chatterjee, Rudranil Ghosh	Drama	
Josh	Rabi Kinagi	Jeet (actor), Srabanti Chatterjee (Biswas), Tapas Paul	Romance	
Jai Baba Bholenath	Babu Ray	Jackie Shroff, Abhishek Chatterjee	Religious	
Kachhe Achho Tumi	Pallab Ghosh	Jisshu Sengupta, Swastika Mukherjee	Romance	
Kakhano Biday Bolona	S.K. Murlidharan	Jisshu Sengupta, Malabika	Romance	
Kellafate	Pijus Saha	Ankush Hazra, Rupasree	Romance	
Keno Mon Take Chay	Milan Bhowmik	Raaj, Rimjhim Mitra	Romance	
Kicchu Chaoa Kicchu Paoaa	Shankar Roy	Soham Chakraborty (Bittu), Swarnakamal Dutta, Biplab Chatterjee	Romance	
Kings of Devon	Rahsaan Islam	Rahsaan Islam, Bakhtiar Hafeez	Dark comedy	
Laboratory	Raja Sen	Raveena Tandon, Ranjit Mallick, Sabyasachi Chakrabarty	Drama	
Lajja	Dayal Acharya	Joy, Moubani Sarkar	Drama	
Le Chakka	Raj Chakraborty	Dev (Bengali actor), Payel Sarkar, Ritwick Chakraborty, Aritra Dutta Banik	Romance	
Love Circus	Dulal Bhowmik	Rahul, Rudranil Ghosh	Romance	
Love Connection	Biresh Chattopadhyay	Babushaan Mohanty, Ridhima Ghosh, Sunny	Romance	
Lukochuri	Bijoy	Jisshu Sengupta, Rudranil Ghosh	Comedy	
Maa	Shiladtya Moulik	Gautam Mukherjee, Samaresh Basu	Drama	
Maati-O-Manush	Sisir Sahana	Sabyasachi Chakrabarty, Rimjhim Gupta, Tapas Paul	Drama	
Maha Sati Sabitri	Arup Dasgupta	Rachana Banerjee, Bodhisattwa Majumdar	Drama	
Mahanagari	Kanoj Das	Firdous Ahmed, Rimjhim Gupta	Drama	
Mahanagar@Kolkata	Suman Mukhopadhyay	Rituparna Sengupta, Firdous Ahmed	Drama	
Mama Square	Sanat Dutta	Tapas Paul	Drama	
Maryada	Tanmoy Sengupta	Anjan Dutt, Chandan Roy Sanyal, Rituparna Sengupta	Drama	
Megh Brishti Alo	Babla Bagchi	Sudhin Halder, Saptamita	Drama	
Mela	Dhananjay Mandal	Rudranil Ghosh, Mouli Bhattacharya	Romance	
Mon Amar Shudhu Tomar	Raj Mukherjee	Sujoy, Priyadarshini	Romance	
Mon Chay Tomay	Prabir Kar	Kamalesh, Moubani Sarkar	Romance	
Mon Je Kore Uru Uru	Sujit Guha	Hiran Chatterjee, Koyel Mallick	Romance	
Mon Niye	Swapan Saha	Rishi, Subhra Kundu	Romance	
Moner Manush	Goutam Ghose	Prasenjit Chatterjee, Chanchal Chowdhury, Priyanshu Chatterjee, Paoli Dam	Drama	
Musalmanir Galpo	Pranab Choudhury	Sudip Mukherjee, Mumtaz Sorcar, Biplab Chatterjee	Drama	
Notobor Notout	Amit Sen	Raima Sen, Mustofa Prokash, Ramaprasad Banik	Comedy	
Ogo Bodhu Sundari	Sunando Mitra	Babul Supriyo, Sreelekha Mitra	Comedy	
Pahari Moyna	Ramnath Roy	Subrata Sarkar, Suhasini Bagchi	Drama	
Poth Jodi Na Shesh Hoy	Swapan Saha	Hrishi, Vaaniya	Drama	
Pratidwandi	Anup Sengupta	Rahul, Priyanka	Comedy	
Prem by Chance	Abhijit Guha, Sudeshna Roy	Abir Chatterjee, Koyel Mullick, Dipankar De	Romance	
Preyashi	Purnendu Halder	Samrat, Paoli Dam	Drama	
Rehmat Ali	Partho Ghosh	Mithun Chakraborty, Roopa Ganguly, Rituparna Sengupta	Drama	
Rose Craze Rose	Arabinda Ghosh	Chiranjeet, Sanjib Dasgupta	Drama	
Sara Raat	Ranjitmul Kankaria	Avik Banerjee, Shinjini	Drama	
Sathi Tumi Aamar	N. Padhi	Siddhanta Manmohan Mahapatra, Payel Banerjee, Sonali	Action	
Sati Behula	Manoj Kumar	Hema Malini, Bhagyashree, Rajesh Sharma	Devotional	
Sesh Prohor	Rajsekhar Bose	Sabyasachi Chakrabarty, Suman Banerjee	Drama	
Shedin Dekha Hoyechilo	Sujit Mondol	Dev (Bengali actor), Srabanti Chatterjee, Tapas Paul	Romance	
Shono Mon Boli Tomaay	Prodip Saha	Rahul, Paran Bandyopadhyay	Drama	
Shukno Lanka	Gaurav Pandey	Mithun Chakraborty, Debashree Roy, Sabyasachi Chakrabarty	Drama	
Simanto Periye	Somnath Sen	Abhishek Chatterjee, Biplab Chatterjee	Drama	
Smriti Katha Bole	Partha Mukherjee	Debjani, Sanjib Dasgupta	Drama	
Soldier	Dulal Bhowmik	Prasenjit Chatterjee, Soham Chakraborty (Bittu)	Drama	
Sthaniyo Sangbad	Moinak Biswas, Arjun Gourisaria	Suman Mukhopadhyay, Bratya Basu, Manali Dey, Anirban Datta	Drama	
Swayamsiddha	Sudhanshu Mohan Sahu	Yuktta, Siddhanta	Drama	
Tara	Bratya Basu	Prasenjit Chatterjee, Joy Mukherjee, Dipankar De, Paoli Dam	Drama	
Target	Raja Chanda	Mithun Chakraborty, Sayantika Banerjee, Joy	Drama	
Thana Theke Aschi	Saron Dutta	Sabyasachi Chakrabarty, Parambrata Chatterjee, Paoli Dam, Rudranil Ghosh	Drama	
Thikana Rajpath	Konoj Das	Debashree Roy, Indrani Halder, Firdous Ahmed	Drama	
U Turn	Animesh Roy	Indrajit Chakraborty, Soumili Biswas	Drama	
Wanted	Rabi Kinagi	Jeet (actor), Srabanti Chatterjee, Aritra Dutta Banik	Drama	
