= Megh Roddur =

- Directed by: Surajit Dhar; Sudarshan Basu
- Written by: Surajit Dhar
- Produced by: DK Entertainment
- Starring: Subhashree; Palash Ganguly; Biswajit Chakraborty; Anindya Banerjee; Biswanath Basu; Debolina Dutta; Biplab Dasgupta; Pathasarathi Chakraborty; Kumar; Rupsa
- Cinematography: Nayanmoni Ghosh
- Edited by: Amit Debnath
- Music by: Rishi Chanda
- Production company: DK Entertainment
- Distributed by: DK Entertainment
- Release date: 15 February 2013
- Running time: 185 minutes
- Country: India
- Language: Bengali
- Budget: 9 million
- Box office: 8.1 million

Megh Roddur (Bengali: মেঘ রোদ্দুর; English: Clouds and Sunlight) is a 2013 Bengali film directed by Surajit Dhar and Sudarhan Basu and produced under the banner of DK Entertainment. Music of the film has been composed by Rishi Chanda. The film was released on 15 February 2013.

== Plot ==
Madhuja Sen (Subhashree), an actress comes to Shillong to shoot her film and happens to meet Arpan (Palash Ganguly), a bookshop owner. She eventually falls in love with him. In the meantime, a sudden terrorist attack takes place in the town and has an influence on their lives.

Though the film is a close copy of Notting Hill (1999), it is not an absolute copy of the same.

== Cast ==
- Subhashree as Madhuja Sen
- Palash Ganguly as Arpan Ganguly
- Kumar as Tathagata
- Debolina Dutta as Paromita
- Sheli as Rupsha Ganguly
- Biplab Dasgupta
- Biswajit Chakraborty
- Anindya Banerjee
- Biswanath Basu
- Parthasarathi Chakraborty as Arpan's friend

== Soundtrack ==
Megh Roddur

Soundtrack album by Rishi Chanda
- Released: 2013
- Recorded: 2012
- Genre: Feature film soundtrack
- Label: DK Entertainment
- Producer: DK Entertainment

Singles from Megh Roddur

Track listing
No.	Title	Music	Singer	Length
1.	"Ki Boli Na Boli"	Rishi Chanda	Shaan & Somchanda Bhattachariya	3:14
2.	"Jale Mon"	Rishi Chanda	Javed Ali, Anweshaa	3:28
3.	"Ami Achi Tai"	Rishi Chanda	Rishi Chanda	3:22
4.	"Mon Amour"	Rishi Chanda	Kunal Ganjawala
5.	"Aaj Abar Ami Eka"	Rishi Chanda	Zubeen Garg	4:39

== See also ==
- The Light: Swami Vivekananda
- Loveria
- Namte Namte
- Rupe Tomay Bholabo Na
- Damadol
