= Bangali Babu English Mem =

- Directed by: Ravi Kinnagi
- Written by: N K Salil
- Based on: Jatt and Juliet (Punjabi)
- Produced by: Shrikant Mohta; Mahendra Soni
- Starring: Soham Chakraborty; Mimi Chakraborty; Biswajit Chakraborty; Laboni Sarkar
- Cinematography: Kumud Verma
- Edited by: Md. Kalam
- Music by: Dabbu; Ajoy; Rishi Chanda
- Production company: Shree Venkatesh Films
- Release date: 31 January 2014 (Kolkata)
- Running time: 146 minutes
- Country: India
- Language: Bengali

Bangali Babu English Mem (2014) is an Indian Bengali language romantic comedy film directed by Ravi Kinnagi and released by Shree Venkatesh Films. It is a remake of Punjabi movie Jatt & Juliet.

== Cast ==
- Soham Chakraborty as Madhusudan Dutta
- Mimi Chakraborty as Riya
- Biswajit Chakraborty as Haranath
- Laboni Sarkar as Parboti
- Abir Chatterjee in a special appearance as Captain Bikram
- Payel Sarkar in a cameo appearance as Air hostage Liza
- Supriyo Dutta as Mr Dutta
- Julia as Jenny

== Plot ==
Madhusudan Dutta, a young man from Kolkata, wants to marry a Canadian girl to obtain Canadian citizenship while on the other hand Riya a classy modern girl wants to go to Canada to study fashion design. They first meet at the passport office where Madhusudan asks Riya to fill his form because his hand was injured which he was pretending because of his lack of English. They again meet at the airport and often disagree due to this. Riya looks for a nice accommodation where she finds a nice house and while getting money out of the ATM, she gets robbed by two thugs. Unfortunately, Riya has to look for a cheaper place where she meets Madhusudan again and has to share that apartment with him. A day arrives when Jenny a Canadian Caucasian girl, arrives at the house where Riya and Madhusudan are living as she is the step-daughter of the house owner. Riya asks Madhusudan to propose to Jenny and they start making plans on how to get Jenny for Madhusudan, but when Madhusudan learns that Jenny is going to Africa for social service, he ditches her and poor Jenny is left heartbroken. The owner of the house throws them out and they work at two different Horo Parboti restaurants that are run by a wife and husband, who are not together at the moment. Madhusudan and Riya soon learn that the Horo Parboti is going to be re-possessed by the bank because of six months unpaid property payments for the loan. Madhusudan and Riya work out the process of re-joining the husband and wife so that the loan could be paid off. Slowly, Madhusudan and Riya start falling for each other but neither of them wants to admit it. Madhusudan realises that he loves Riya when Riya's fiancé, Bikram comes to take Riya with him to India for their marriage. Finally Madhusudan leaves for India with the hope of bringing Riya back to his life but after seeing Riya married, he is left heartbroken. After a while, he meets Bikram at a cinema hall where Bikram tells him that Riya is still single and Madhusudan runs to propose to Riya and they live happily ever after.

== Soundtrack ==
#	Title	Singer(s)	Lyrics(s)	Music	Duration
1	E Ki Prem	Rishi Chanda, Jonita Gandhi	Prasen	Rishi Chanda	4:59
2	Honey Bunny	Satrujit, Nakash Aziz, Aditi Paul	Satrujit	Dabbu	3:41
3	Hawara Chupi Chupi	Shaan	Prasen	AJAY	5:01
4	Dol Duluni	Satrujit Dasgupta	Raja Chanda	Dabbu	4:06
5	Ore Mon Udashi	Arijit Singh	Prasen	Dabbu	4:12
6	Honey Bunny (Version 2)	Satrujit Dasgupta	Satrujit	Dabbu	2:12

== Reactions ==
Writing in The Times of India, Jaya Biswas had a generally positive but mixed reaction to the film, saying:

"The best part about the film is its dialogues. The way Madhu confidently converses in wrong English is hilarious. The humour appeals to all and comes across as a breath of fresh air amidst parts of boredom. The first half drags a lot."

More negative comments by the reviewer included such statements as "However, there are a few discrepancies in the plot", "No doubt the girl can act, but she too needs to hone her dancing skills a bit.", and "The first half drags a lot."

The review closed with the comment: "Bangali Babu English Mem is worth a dekko."

The Business Standard referred to the film as "...a typical Bengali rom-com with a new Tollywood pair."
