= Master Anshuman =

2023 Bengali film

Master Anshuman is a Bengali Children's drama film directed by Sagnik Chatterjee and produced by SoundMotion Entertainment Pvt. Ltd. based on the same name story of Satyajit Ray. This movie was released on 5 May 2023.

== Plot ==
This is the story of a teenager Anshuman who receives an offer from film Director Sushil Mallik in his movie at Darjeeling. Anshuman joins in the shooting unit and befriends a kind hearted stuntman captain Krishnan. A valuable Blue Bell stone goes missing from Mr. Lohia's house during the shooting and Anshuman gets involved in the investigation. He finally saves the accused but innocent man Krishnan and finds out the real culprit.

== Cast ==
- Priyanka Upendra as Madhabi Sen
- Supriyo Dutta as Sushil Mallik
- Rajatava Dutta as Jaggu Ostad
- Samontak Dyuti Maitra as Master Anshuman
- Som Chattopadhyay as Krishnan
- Rabi Khemu as Mr. Lohia
- Aritra Ganguly
- Debesh Roy Chowdhury
