= Suman Banerjee =

Indian computer scientist

Academic background
- Education: IIT Kanpur (BTech); University of Maryland, College Park (MS, PhD)

Academic work
- Discipline: Computer science
- Sub-discipline: Computer networks
- Institutions: University of Wisconsin–Madison

Suman Banerjee is an Indian computer scientist and businessman working as the David J. DeWitt Professor of computer science at the University of Wisconsin–Madison.

== Education ==
Banerjee earned a Bachelor of Technology degree in computer science and engineering from IIT Kanpur in 1996, followed by a Master of Science and PhD in computer science from the University of Maryland, College Park.

== Career ==
Banerjee worked as an assistant and associate professor at the University of Wisconsin-Madison from 2004 to 2014. He was the CTO and co-founder of StratusWorX, a company that developed cloud workspace software. In July 2020, Ericsson acquired StratusWorX and the company's patent portfolio.

Banerjee was named an ACM Fellow in 2020 for his contributions to research in the area of wireless systems and an IEEE Fellow in 2022 for his contributions to the "development of tools to improve performance and usability of wireless systems". He has been cited more than 28,000 times (April 2021).
