= Macho Mustanaa =

- Theatrical release poster
- Directed by: Reshmi Mitra
- Written by: Pele; Reshmi Mitra (dialogues)
- Screenplay by: Pele; Reshmi Mitra
- Story by: Hiranmoy Chatterjee
- Produced by: P.P Tewari
- Starring: See below
- Cinematography: Kumud Verma
- Edited by: M. Sushmit
- Music by: Samidh Mukerjee
- Production company: Remac Filmz
- Release date: 9 March 2012 (Kolkata)
- Running time: 120 minutes
- Country: India
- Language: Bengali
- Box office: ₹1.4 crore (equivalent to ₹2.6 crore or US$280,000 in 2023)

Macho Mustanaa is a 2012 Bengali action film co-written and directed by Reshmi Mitra and produced under the banner of Remac Filmz Production. The film features actors Hiran (also story writer of the film) and Pooja in the lead roles. Music of the film has been composed by Samidh Mukerjee.

== Plot ==
The film commences by showing a happy and united family, consisting of Nabab, his father, grandfather, elder brother and sister-in-law (who was pregnant). One day, Nabab met Diya on the street, and they fell in love. Following this, they had a tough time as Diya's father, Bidhan Chattoraj, hired goons to separate them. Even after spending a lot of time escaping those goons, the goons finally catch them, and Bidhan Chottoraj gets his daughter back. Since that incident, Nabab's life faces a turn as he is accused of false charges and sent to jail. But Bidhan Chattoraj doesn't stop here. In the fire of vengeance, he decides to demolish Nabab's family. He kills Nabab's elder brother and grandfather, paralyses his father, and finally, his sister-in-law lost her unborn child. Nabab becomes furious upon this. The events that occur next, i.e., through which Nabab gets back Diya and takes revenge on Bidhan Chattoraj, form the climax of the story.

== Cast ==
- Hiran as Nabab
- Pooja as Diya
- Arun Bannerjee as Bidhan Chattoraj
- Rajat Ganguly as Nabab's father
- Bibhu Bhattacharya as Nabab's grandfather
- Shantilal Mukherjee as a goon
- Dolon Roy as Bidisha Mukherjee
- Debdut Ghosh as Nabab's elder brother
- Arpita Dutta Chowdhury as Nabab's sister-in-law

== Title issue ==
The film began production under the title Macho Mustafa. The title was later changed to Macho Mustanaa, to avoid potential objection from Muslim sects, just like the 1997 Bollywood film, which was initially titled Musthafa.

== Soundtrack ==
Macho Mustanaa

Soundtrack album by Samidh Mukerjee
- Released: 2012
- Genre: Feature film soundtrack

Samidh Mukerjee chronology
100% Love (2012)	Macho Mustanaa (2012)	Om Shanti (2012)

Samidh Mukerjee composed the film score for Macho Mustanaa. Lyrics are penned by Samidh Mukerjee, Priyo Chatterjee and Goutam Susmit.

=== Track listing ===
No.	Title	Lyrics	Singer(s)	Length
1.	"Macho Mastanaa (Title Song)"	Samidh Mukerjee	Samidh Mukerjee	4:35
2.	"Jaane Jaana"	Priyo Chatterjee, Samidh Mukerjee	Shreya Ghoshal, Kunal Ganjawala	5:07
3.	"Bailmos"	Priyo Chatterjee, Samidh Mukerjee	Sunidhi Chauhan, Kunal Ganjawala	4:33
4.	"Rukega Badal (Duet)"	Goutam Susmit, Samidh Mukerjee	Samidh Mukerjee, Monali Thakur	5:53
5.	"Madhubala"	Goutam Susmit, Samidh Mukerjee	Kalpana Patowary	4:47
6.	"Sawariyaa"	Goutam Susmit	Krishna Beura	5:38
7.	"Rukega Badal Sad (Male)"	Samidh Mukerjee	Samidh Mukerjee	5:53
