= Supriyo Dutta =

Indian film actor

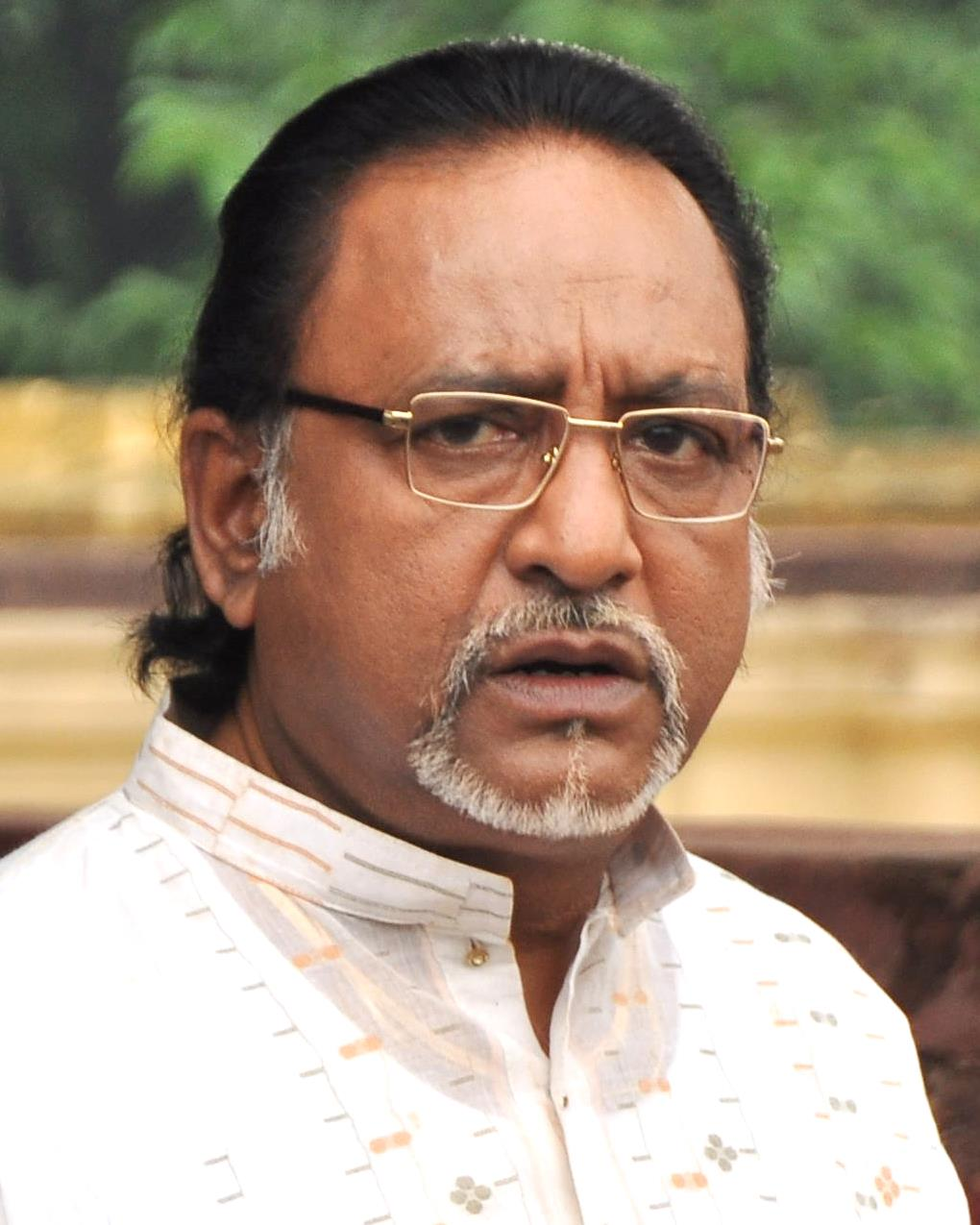
- Dutta in 2019
- Born: Kolkata, West Bengal
- Occupations: Actor; Theatre artist; Voice artist
- Known for: Challenge; Josh; Shedin Dekha Hoyechilo; 100% Love; Awara; Boss 2

Supriyo Dutta is an Indian Bengali language film and theatre artist from West Bengal. He is prominently known for his diverse roles in the Tollywood industry. He started his career as a background artist in the Indian Bengali film and established himself as an iconic personality in the theatres as well as films.

He is associated with the theatre group "Chetana" since 1980s and has worked with many other theatre groups including "Tritiyo Sutra".

== Career ==
Dutta started his career as a theatre artist in Kolkata. Born in a lower middle class family, he dreamt of becoming an actor from a small age. Although a good student at Ramkrishna Mission Puruliya and also a good Football player, Then he worked in BSNL at high rank.

He regularly worked with variouys theatre groups since the late 80s and 90s. He has been closely associated with the theatre groups "Chetana" and "Tritiya Sutra". He has worked in numerous plays including Dukhi Mukhi Joddha, Kangal Malshat, Gontobyo, Rani Cruesa and others.

He got a break with Herbert, starring Subhashish Mukhopadhyay, in 2005, but it didn't become a success. His major break came in 2008 with the Raj Chakraborty directorial blockbuster Chirodini Tumi Je Amar. He played the role of the lead actress' uncle. After that, he has starred in various roles in many commercial action films in Tollywood.

== Filmography ==
Year	Title	Role	Notes
2005	Herbert	Surapati Marik	
2008	Chirodini Tumi Je Amar	Pallavi's uncle	
2009	Challenge	Kartik Da	
2009	Prem Amar	Ravi's father	
2009	Saat Paake Badha	Manager	
2010	Bolo Na Tumi Aamar	Gunodhar	
2010	Le Chakka	Rani's father	
2010	Josh	Mangal	
2010	Dui Prithibi	Naxalite leader	
2010	Kellafate	Home Minister	
2010	Shedin Dekha Hoyechilo	Inspector Biswanath Babu	
2011	Shotru	Arjun Sarkar	
2011	Faande Poriya Boga Kaande Re	Deep's father	
2012	100% Love	Rahul's father	
2012	Awara	Gunodhar Chakraborty	
2013	Loveria	Adi's father	
2013	Kanamachi	Tarakeshwar Dutta	
2013	Khoka 420	Krish's fake father	
2013	Rangbaaz	Police CommissionerAjay	
2014	Bindaas	Kajol's grandfather	
2014	Ami Shudhu Cheyechi Tomay	Talukdar	Indo-Bangladesh joint production
2014	Bachchan	Bijoy's father	
2014	Yoddha	Shanku	
2015	Herogiri	OC Gurupodo Ghosh	
2015	Romeo vs Juliet	Village morol	Indo-Bangladesh joint production
2015	Jamai 420	Dhanakrishna Dhali	
2015	Besh Korechi Prem Korechi	Kanai Da	
2015	Bawal		
2015	Shudhu Tomari Jonyo	Siraz's father	
2016	Power	Bijay Sanyal	
2016	Love Express	Dhananjay Babu	
2016	Shikari	Abdulla / Abbu	Indo-Bangladesh joint production
2016	Niyoti	Mila's father	Indo-Bangladesh joint production
2016	Abhimaan	Mr. Thanthaniya	
2016	Thammar Boyfriend	Subrato Babu	
2017	Tomake Chai	Ajay Sen	
2017	Chaamp	Narukaka	
2017	Boss 2: Back to Rule	Gopinath Shivalkar	Indo-Bangladesh joint production
2017	Shob Bhooturey	Kripa Babu	
2017	Jio Pagla	Khagen Mal	
2018	Inspector Notty K	Notty K's father	Indo-Bangladesh joint production
2018	Piya Re		
2018	Hoytoh Manush Noy		
2018	Naqaab	MLA Ratan Sardar	
2019	Jamai Badal	Gaurisankar Chakladar	
2019	Nolok	Roju	Bangladeshi film
2020	Hullor		
2020	Love Story		
2020	Dracula Sir	Bhuban Babu	
2023	Master Anshuman	Sushil Mallik	
2023	Sanataner Kirti		
2024	Aalor Disha		

== Television ==
- Bhojo Gobindo (Star Jalsha)
- Stree (Zee Bangla)
- Jibon Saathi (Zee Bangla)
- Gangaram (Star Jalsha)
- Jamuna Dhaki (Zee Bangla)
- Sarbojaya (Zee Bangla)
- Jagaddhatri (Zee Bangla)
- Nayika No.1 (Colors Bangla)
- Geeta LL.B (Star Jalsha)
- Professor Bidya Banerjee (Star Jalsha)
- Tilottama (Star Jalsha)

== Controversies ==
As a sign of protest against the 2024 Kolkata rape and murder incident in 2024 and due to a related controversy with MP Kanchan Mullick, he returned his Paschim Banga Natya Akademi Award.
