= Kranti: The Revolution =

2006 Indian Bengali film

Kranti
- Theatrical release poster
- Directed by: Riingo Banerjee
- Written by: Riingo Banerjee
- Screenplay by: Riingo Banerjee
- Story by: Riingo Banerjee
- Starring: Jeet; Swastika Mukherjee; Ashish Vidyarthi; Rishi Kaushik
- Cinematography: Riingo Banerjee
- Edited by: Riingo Banerjee
- Music by: Jeet Gannguli, Som-Samidh-Rishi, Riingo Banerjee
- Production company: Shree Venkatesh Films
- Release date: 25 August 2006
- Running time: 160 minutes
- Country: India
- Language: Bengali

Kranti: The Revolution is a 2006 Indian Bengali-language action crime film written, scored, edited and directed by Riingo Banerjee in his directorial debut. Produced by Shrikant Mohta under the banner of Shree Venkatesh Films, the film is a partial adaptation of Ram Gopal Varma's 1989 Telugu film Shiva. It stars Jeet, Ashish Vidyarthi and Swastika Mukherjee in the lead roles. The film was a big success in the career of Jeet and considered his best screen performance till date. It is the 15th film as lead actor of Jeet. The film also was a sleeper hit.

== Plot ==
Jeetendra Ghosh or Jeet (Jeet) is a student whose family, consisting of his parents and elder sister Devashree Ghosh (Locket Chatterjee), migrated to the city Kolkata. Since their arrival, they have struggled amongst the crowd to exist. People of Kolkata fear Vishnu (Ashish Vidyarthi), the local don. His younger brother Deva (Rishi Kaushik) studies in the same college as Jeet. Deva's gang in the college are the biggest troublemakers, who tease girls and pass bad comments at them. Jeet, who tries to handle the situation, clashes with Deva's gang for a number of times and beats his gang members. In retaliation, Vishnu's goons start attacking his family members and friends. One day they spot Debashree on the road and assaults her. They rape her one by one in public. Police started investigating, and an Inspector named Ronojoy (Rajesh Sharma) was assigned, and he sought to punish the wrongdoers, but he wasn't able to punish them as Vishnu and his gang were too much powerful and had many politicians support. They also kill his college friend Iqbal (Biswanath Basu) for standing against Vishnu in elections. Jeet, in a fit of rage, killed Vishnu's younger brother Deva inside a car, strangulating his neck with a copper wire to avenge his friend Iqbal's death. Vishnu couldn't bear the loss of his so loving brother, infuriated and disturbingly killed Jeet's father Sridhar Ghosh (Bodhisatwa Majumdar). A helpless and heartbroken Jeet is left with nothing, but only a strong desire to punish the wrongdoers. He becomes determined to kill Vishnu. In the end, Jeet is successful in killing Vishnu, thus fulfilling his revenge.

== Cast ==
- Jeet as Jeetendra Ghosh / Jeet
  - Aritra Dutta Banik as Young Jeet
- Swastika Mukherjee as Arpita
- Alokananda Roy as Sohini Ghosh, Jeet's mother
- Ashish Vidyarthi as Vishnu, a dreaded gangster supported by politicians
- Bodhisattwa Majumdar as Shridhar Ghosh, Jeet's father
- Locket Chatterjee as Debashree Ghosh, Jeet's elder sister
- Biswanath Basu as Iqbal
- Raja Chattopadhyay
- Rishi Kaushik as Deva, Vishnu's younger brother
- Rajesh Sharma as Inspector Ranajoy
- Bhola Tamang
- Biplab Dasgupta as Rabi

== Soundtrack ==
Kranti

Soundtrack album by Jeet Gannguli, Som-Rishi-Samidh, Riingo Banerjee
- Released: September 2006
- Genre: Feature film soundtrack
- Language: Bengali
- Label: SVF
- Producer: Shree Venkatesh Films

Singles from Kranti
- 1. "Banglay Gaan Gayi" Released: 21 February 2015

Jeet Gannguli chronology
Refugee (2006)	Kranti (2006)	Nabab Nandini (2007)

Samidh-Rishi chronology
Kranti (2006)	Josh (2010)

Riingo Banerjee chronology
Kranti (2006)	Neel Rajar Deshe (2008)

All music is composed by Jeet Gannguli, Som-Rishi-Samidh, Riingo Banerjee, which is his only work as a film score composer. The song "Prithibi Bodle Geche" was shot in Tawang, Arunachal Pradesh.

Track listing
No.	Title	Lyrics	Music	Singer(s)	Length
1.	"Prithibi Bodle Geche"		Jeet Gannguli	Shreya Ghoshal, Babul Supriyo	5:26
2.	"Kranti Theme"		Riingo Banerjee	Som-Rishi-Samidh	5:28
3.	"Banglay Gaan Gayi"	Pratul Mukherjee	Som, Rishi, Samidh	Anindya Bose	4:51
