= Dui Prithibi (2010 film) =

2010 Indian Bengali film

- Theatrical poster
- Directed by: Raj Chakraborty
- Based on: Gamyam by Krish Jagarlamudi
- Screenplay by: N. K. Salil; Raj Chakraborty
- Dialogues by: N. K. Salil
- Story by: Raj Chakraborty
- Produced by: Shrikant Mohta
- Starring: Jeet; Dev; Koel Mallick; Barkha Bisht
- Cinematography: Somak Mukherjee; Sirsha Ray
- Edited by: Rabiranjan Maitra
- Music by: Songs: Jeet Gannguli; Samidh-Rishi; Background score: Indraadip Dasgupta
- Production company: Shree Venkatesh Films
- Distributed by: Shree Venkatesh Films
- Release date: 14 October 2010
- Running time: 150 minutes
- Country: India
- Language: Bengali
- Budget: ₹3.5 Crore
- Box office: ₹6.5 Crore

Dui Prithibi (Bengali pronunciation: [dui ˈpɾit̪ʰibi]; transl. Two Worlds) is a 2010 Bengali-language road drama film co-written and directed by Raj Chakraborty. Produced by Shrikant Mohta under the banner of Shree Venkatesh Films. The film is a remake of 2008 Telugu movie Gamyam. It stars Jeet, Dev, Koel Mallick and Barkha Bisht in lead roles. The film revolves around a rich man who acknowledges the means of life, setting out on a journey to the rural Bengal with a bike, and befriends with a thief.

Announced in November 2009, the film marks Chakraborty's collaborations for the first time with both Jeet and Koel, and with Dev for the second time; it is also Jeet and Koel's tenth film as a lead pair. Principal Photography commenced in March 2010 and wrapped by in August 2010. Majorly shot in Kolkata, Purulia, Bankura, Birbhum, Bardhaman and Paschim Medinipur, portions were filmed in Italy, Australia and Switzerland. The soundtrack of the film is composed by Jeet Gannguli and Samidh-Rishi, while Indraadip Dasgupta provided its score. Somak Mukherjee and Sirsha Ray handled its cinematography, with editing by Rabiranjan Maitra.

Dui Prithibi was theatrically released on 14 October 2010, on the occasion of Durga Puja. Opening to huge critical and commercial response, the film ran for over 50 weekes in theatres, emerging as the highest-grossing Bengali film of 2010. Eventually attaining a cult status for the only collaboration between Jeet and Dev, the two acting giants of Bengali cinema. The film's dialogue and certain characters became extremely popular, contributing to numerous cultural memes and becoming part of Bengal's daily vernacular.

== Plot ==
Rahul Roy is the son of a multi-millionaire, brought up in comfort and luxury. To him, life is just a game, and he is accustomed to a lavish lifestyle. He is portrayed as a happy-go-lucky character and is quite popular with women. He comes across Nandini, a young and charming doctor. Rahul challenges his friends that he will make her fall in love with him within a few days. Nandini, being an orphan, is very kind towards poor people and is a good Samaritan. However, Rahul hates such people. Nevertheless, Nandini's free-spirited nature brings him closer to her, and he develops an intimate friendship with her. When Nandini wants to express her love, she learns that Rahul had challenged his friends about making her fall in love with him and decides to distance herself from him. While dropping her at her hostel in his car after a party, Rahul tries to convince her that he is truly in love with her, but she does not listen to him. In the process, Rahul meets with an accident in which a woman dies, leaving her son orphaned. Nandini survives the accident, while Rahul regains consciousness in the hospital. After gaining consciousness, Rahul cannot find Nandini, so he decides to go in search of her on his bike.

In the process, he meets a motorcycle thief named Shibu. The journey Rahul undertakes changes his life drastically, as he is exposed to the harsh realities of rural life and, at the same time, its simple joys.

A teacher who supports orphaned children, a helpless pregnant woman, an ex-militant named Binoy, a prostitute, and his own companion Shibu all aid him in his journey of self-discovery. One rainy night, they are captured by the militants of a Naxalite leader who wants to execute the renegade Binoy. Crossfire breaks out between the Naxalites and the police. While escaping, the bike gets trapped in the mud. Shibu succeeds in getting the bike out but is shot in the back and dies. Rahul is devastated by Shibu's death. He then learns that Nandini is at the railway station, preparing to leave for Kolkata. Rahul finally meets Nandini and expresses his feelings and admits his mistakes. Nandini becomes emotional. Rahul tells Nandini that he does not care whether she comes with him or not, and thanks her because, due to her, he got to know the outside world. Nandini finally accepts him and hugs him. The movie ends with both of them embracing each other.

== Cast ==
- Jeet as Rahul Roy
- Dev as Shibu, a motorbike thief, later Rahul's road partner and friend
- Koel as Dr. Nandini Sen, Rahul's love interest
- Barkha Sengupta as Parul, Shibu's love interest / Mandakini, a dancer
- Manoj Mitra as Purnochandra Roy, a school teacher and Nandini's mentor
- Kharaj Mukherjee as Gobardhan Panda (Gopaler Baba)
- Supriyo Dutta as Master Da, a Naxalite leader
- Debranjan Nag as Binayak, an ex-Naxalite
- Dr. Basudev Mukherjee as Abhiraj Roy, a renowned industrialist and Rahul's father
- Suman Banerjee as Barun, Rahul's friend
- Abhimanyu Mukherjee as Vicky, Rahul's friend
- Pradip Bhattacharya as Sanatan, a garage mechanic and Shibu's step-brother
- Raja Dutta as a Naxalite
- Parthasarathi Chakraborty as Kajol
- Kalyan Chatterjee as Kaka, owner of a dhaba
- Subrata Guha Roy as police inspector in Lalgarh
- RJ Megha as Manoroma, a singer

== Production ==
The film was the 42nd venture of Bengali production house Shree Venkatesh Films. It was the fifth film of director Raj Charaborty and the tenth film for Dev and the Jeet-Koel pair. It was Raj's first film with Jeet-Koel, fourth with "SVF" and the third with Dev after "Challenge" (2009) and "Le Chakka" (2010). It was also the first time that the two reigning Bengali superstars, Dev and Jeet had come together. For the first time a budget of ₹3.5 crore was commissioned for a Bengali film as this was the first road movie in the industry which was required to be shot on a large-scale and canvas. The 'muhurat shot' was canned on 2 March 2010. The film was extensively shot in Kolkata and the rural belt of West Bengal like Lalgarh and Gopiballavpur (Maoist-infested areas), Purulia, Bantala, etc., and the songs were filmed in Venice. It was the first Bengali film to be shot in Italy and only the second mainstream Bengali film to be shot in Europe, after "Bhalobasa Bhalobasa" (2008) was shot in Austria. While the main film was shot by cinematographer Somak Mukherjee; Sirsha Ray came on board for the Venice-leg as Somak couldn't allot his dates. Bollywood item-girl Barkha Bisht, famous for her "Ishq Barse" dance-number from the film "Raajneeti", was roped in for an item-number "Pyarelal". The film's lead composer Jeet Gannguli was also supposed to do the background score of the film. But a leg-injury rendered him indisposed; resulting in another leading composer Indradeep Dasgupta performing the duties. The first-look of the film was launched on 17.9.10 with the song "O yaara ve", filmed on all the four leads that was aired on the leading Bengali entertainment channel "Sangeet Bangla".

The film was shot in India and Italy (Apulia), at Alberobello, Santa Cesarea Terme and Fasano.

== Soundtrack ==
Dui Prithibi

Soundtrack album by Jeet Gannguli, Samidh-Rishi
- Released: 14 October 2010
- Recorded: 2010
- Genre: Feature film soundtrack
- Language: Bengali
- Label: SVF
- Producer: Shree Venkatesh Films

Singles from Dui Prithibi
- 1. "O Yaara Ve" Released: 16 Sep 2010; 2. "It's Only Pyaar" Released: 23 Sep 2010; 3. "Pyarelal" Released: 25 Sep 2010; 4. "Bol Naa Aar" Released: 4 Oct 2010; 5. "Dui Prithibi (Title Track)" Released: 8 Oct 2010

Jeet Gannguli chronology
Amanush (2010)	Dui Prithibi (2010)	Mon Je Kore Uru Uru (2010)

Samidh-Rishi chronology
Josh (2010)	Dui Prithibi (2010)	Shedin Dekha Hoyechilo (2010)

The soundtrack of the film is composed by Jeet Gannguli and Samidh-Rishi, in their respective collaborations with Chakraborty for the fourth and first time. It consists five tracks, three of which are penned by Prasen and Samidh Mukerjee.

Track listing
No.	Title	Lyrics	Music	Singer(s)	Length
1.	"Dui Prithibi (title track)"	Prasen	Jeet Gannguli	Timir Biswas, Rana Mazumdar	5:34
2.	"It's Only Pyaar"	Samidh Mukerjee	Samidh-Rishi	Kunal Ganjawala, Monali Thakur	5:29
3.	"Bol Naa Aar"	Prasen	Jeet Gannguli	Shaan, Monali Thakur	4:57
4.	"Pyarelal"	Samidh Mukherjee	Samidh-Rishi	Richa Sharma, Anand Raj Anand	7:00
5.	"O Yaara Ve"	Prasen	Jeet Gannguli	Kunal Ganjawala, Bonnie Chakraborty, June Banerjee, Monali Thakur	4:51
Total length:					27:51

== Release ==
=== Theatrical ===
The film released in an unprecedented 209 theatres across West Bengal on a Thursday during 'Saptami' of the 'Durga Puja'. It ran for 5 weeks in the city, after which it had to make space for another big release Mon Je Kore Uru Uru; though according to "The Telegraph", the film managed to complete a 6-week run in the city. The film had its longest multiplex run of 4 weeks at 'Bioscope', Axis Mall in Rajarhat and 'Inox Burdwan'. "Dui Prithibi" completed an extraordinary run of 50 weeks at the distant rural theatres of 'Basanti' at Dantan and 'Haraparbati' at Jhatipahari. It is understood, that the producers, 'SVF' deliberately withdrew the film from the city for "MJKUU" since they share extremely friendly relations with their producers, 'Surinder Films'. They in turn returned the favour to 'SVF' by withdrawing "MJKUU" from city-halls within 5 weeks to make room for the next 'SVF' offering, "Sedin Dekha Hoyechilo". Without this friendly gesture from the producers, "Dui Prithibi" could have been expected to continue its successful city-run for a longer period of time.

=== Home media ===
The digital streaming rights of Dui Prithibi were acquired by Hoichoi and Jio Hotstar.The post-theatrical satellite rights were purchased by Star Jalsha, in a combo-package of all ensuing films produced and distributed by Shree Venkatesh Films. It had its premiere on the channel on 13 February 2011.

== Reception ==
=== Critical response ===
Dui Prithibi received acclaim from critics who praised its cast performances, direction, themes, musical score, screenplay, and cinematography. On the review aggregator website Rotten Tomatoes, 89% of 38 critics' reviews are positive, with an average rating of 7.6/10. The website's consensus reads: "Packed with plot twists and breathtaking action, Dui Prithibi manages its convoluted plot and imposing length with high-octane panache."

Roshni Mukherjee of The Times of India gave it a rating of 4/5 stars and opined "An examination to determine whether the two worlds of movie-goers are ready for stuff that go beyond the run-of-the-mill. Rahul’s initial arrogance that gradually gives way to one of self-realization and makes him more humble and down-to-earth could not have been portrayed any better than Jeet. Dev also blows one away as Shibu" Yajneni Chakraborty of Hindustan Times gave it 3.5/5 stars and wrote "The film is totally driven by Jeet and Koel's unbeatable chemistry. In the journey of self-discovery, Dev also maintained his performance through his comic timing". She also praised Chakraborty's direction and the cinematography. Sudipta Dey of WordPress reviewed the film on a positive note, quoting "Raj’s expertise in weaving the story is undoubtedly good; but in the process of storytelling he misses out on the finer details that would have struck a chord with his audience. In the climax, the stormy rainy night in the forest has been shot beautifully and conceptualised well. If not for anything else, just grab a ticket to watch the three heartthrobs of Tollywood come together in one film."

Jagori Bannerjee, from the leading Bengali daily, Anandabazar Patrika, gave it 6.5/10. Swapan Mullick from The Statesman gave it 2.5 stars, but described it to be 'fulfilling expectations'. Sudipta Dey, from The Bengal Post, rated it as 'average' but mentioned the film 'has a strong social message' and 'Raj's expertise in weaving the story is undoubtedly good.'. Veteran film-critic, Shoma A. Chatterji gave the film 5/10 on the web-portal, "Upperstall.com"; but on "Calcuttatube", she increased it to 6/10. Aditya Chakrabarty, from another web-portal, "Washington Bangla Radio" highlighted that Dev had delivered his best performance till then and Jeet and Koel also lived up to the hype. Debabrata Chowdhury, from "Bartaman" opined people should like the film. The leading Bengali magazine, "Anandalok" believed the film created a new world in Bengali commercial cinema. Mahua Duttamitra, from "Ekdin" certified that the director along with his full team had passed with distinction. Samrat Mukherjee, from "Aajkaal" wrote the director has mixed commerce with experimentation. Bidisha Chatterjee, from Sangbad Pratidin, considered the director had hit bull's-eye. "Sakalbela" depicted the film to be a must-watch. Another leading English daily, The Telegraph, also hailed the film's cinematography.

=== Box office ===
"Dui Prithibi" was the highest grosser of 2010, according to a study conducted by FICCI & Deloitte. The film had the highest ever opening week collection for a Bengali film. It grossed almost Rs.29 million in its 1st week, while the producers raked in almost Rs.20 million. The film continued a steady run in the city till the 3rd week. The rural collections though witnessed a fall from the 2nd week itself. Ultimately, after the less-than-expected 5-week city-run, the producers earned an impressive Rs.50 million, as reported in the dailies Gulf Times, The Statesman (23.12.11), The Economic Times (30.4.11); the web-portals Golden Reel (28.1.11), The Indian Express (19.12.11) and the annual report of Deloitte in 2011. The Times of India on 15.6.12 reported that the film was made on a budget of Rs.35 million and did "tentative business" of Rs.40 million.

== Awards and nominations ==
"Dui Prithibi" won three awards at the prestigious 'Star Jalsha Entertainment Awards 2011' held at the Science City Auditorium on 28.5.11. The results were calculated solely on the basis of audience votes sent through SMS and the channel's official website. The following is the list of awards won by the film :-

(1) 'Best Superhit Film'. The other nominations were : "Autograph", "Amanush", "Josh" and "Le Chakka".
(2) 'Best Superhit Music'. The other nominations were : "Autograph", "Amanush", "Moner Manush" and "Le Chakka".
(3) 'Best Superhit Heroine': Koel Mallick for "Dui Prithibi". The other confirmed nominations were : Srabanti Chatterjee for "Wanted", Payel Sarkar for "Le Chakka" and Priyanka Sarkar for "Jodi Ekdin".

Other than these, Jeet was also nominated from this film for 'Best Superhit Hero' which was eventually won by Prosenjit Chatterjee for "Autograph", Dev was nominated from this film for 'Best Supporting Actor' which was in the end won by Saswata Chatterjee for "Byomkesh Bakshi" and Jeet-Koel were nominated from this film for 'Best Pair Award' which was ultimately won by Dev-Payel for "Le Chakka". Barkha Bisht Sengupta won the 'Best Newcomer Award' for this film in the "Anandalok Awards 2010".
