= Loveria =

- Directed by: Raja Chanda
- Screenplay by: N.K. Salil
- Produced by: Shree Venkatesh Films
- Starring: Soham Chakraborty; Puja Banerjee; Rajatava Dutta
- Edited by: Anindya Chatterjee
- Music by: Samidh Mukerjee
- Production companies: Shree Venkatesh Films and Surinder Films
- Release date: 15 February 2013 (Kolkata)
- Country: India
- Language: Bengali

Loveria is a 2013 Bengali action comedy film directed by Raja Chanda and produced under the banner of Shree Venkatesh Films and Surinder Films. It is a remake of the 2009 Telugu film Bumper Offer starring Sairam Shankar and Bindu Madhavi.

== Plot ==
Aditya (Soham Chakraborty) is from a middle-class family but has the degree of a computer engineer. But because of a recession he runs a small car garage called Biswakarma Garage where he is the car-mechanic. Aditya's mother (Tulika Basu) is eagerly waiting for the chance to get his son married. One day, while Aditya was returning from his garage, some goons beat him up and broke his leg without any reason. Later, after Aditya is released from the nursing home, he goes to the goon and finds out who told them to beat him up. The goons tell him that Sweety (Puja Bose) told them to beat him up. Aditya ask Sweety why she did so and Sweety says that the goons beat him up by mistake and actually wanted to beat up another guy who is disturbing Sweety. Aditya does not take the matter so lightly and tells Sweety to marry him as because of this accident his marriage got cancelled. Sweety insults Adi after hearing this and Adi promises to take revenge. The next day, while Adi was returning home, Sweety again beats him up badly with a hockey stick. Adi tries to stop him and by chance Sweety hits his leg which was damaged and the leg becomes fine again! Adi then tells Sweety that he has fallen in love with Sweety and she is booked from today. Sweety becomes furious at this. Meanwhile, Sweety's mother visits Adi's garage to fix her car and sees a poster of a film which shows cheap photo of a couple and calls the media in the garage as she was a social worker working for women. She tells that the film should be banned and also the garage to be closed for keeping that kind of a poster there. Adi talks to Sweety's mother against this and says that this film is not as abusive as it is said and that she is over-acting. This makes Sweety's mother furious at Adi and she complains about this to her husband. She also was furious with Adi so she asks for a pistol from her father one day with an intention to murder Adi. Sweety reaches Adi's garage with the pistol and starts shooting at him. Adi manages to escape and he catches Sweety and ties her up with a rope. Sweety still does not accept Adi's love and meanwhile, Adi's friends call the police to show how Sweety attempted to murder Adi. But the police arrests Adi with a case of insulting Sweety. The police beat Adi up but Adi tells Sweety that he will not move back from his love. An advocate comes and gets Adi out of police custody. Now, Adi's father is a worker in Shantimoy Mukherjee's custody who is Sweety's father (Rajatava Dutta). Shantimoy calls Adi's father and warns him to stop Adi from going near her daughter. In the meantime, Adi finds Sweety running and a guy running after him. Adi gets the wrong idea that Sweety was also abusing him like she did to Adi. So, Adi and the guy catches Sweety and brings her to a quiet place. There Adi gets to know that the guy was abusing Sweety and telling bad words about her character. After knowing the truth Adi beats the guy up for insulting Sweety. Here, Sweety accepts Adi's love and proposes to him.

After this, Shantimoy spots Sweety with Adi on the road. Shantimoy tells Sweety not to mix with Adi but Sweety does not listen to her father. So, Shantimoy decides to beat up Adi's father. Sweety gets to know this and informs Adi about this. Adi immediately reaches Shantimoy's site to save his father and finds him getting beat. Adi saves his father and tells Shantimoy that he will be the one to marry Sweety. Shantimoy tells Adi that he is giving him an offer which is if he can earn 10% of what Shantimoy earns, he will surely get Sweety married to her. Adi does not agree to this condition and gives Shantimoy another bumper offer that by 6 months Adi will make Shantimoy as poor as his father and will take revenge of every hit which hit his father. Sweety supports Adi to this.

After this, Adi finds out about how much property and land Shantimoy owns. After finding this out, Adi tricks Shantimoy into sending all his money and his wife's jewellery outside and Adi takes them away. He also finds out about another secret family Shantimoy has which nobody knows about. He tells the truth to his secret wife and son and his secret son (Aritra Dutta Banik) comes into Shantimoy's current house and family and tells the truth in front of the media and Shantimoy's reputation is spoiled. After this, Adi also takes Shantimoy's assistant and his Swiss bank Account's client into his team and tricks Shantimoy into giving away 300 Million for buying the Victoria Memorial to build a casino there from the Chief-Minister, Kaka (Dipankar De). But actually, the Chief Minister gets only 1 Crore and sells an old haunted house-Victoria Palace to Shantimoy. The rest of the money is divided between the Swiss Bank Account Client (Biswanath Basu) and the rest of the money is kept in Adi's garage. After this, Shantimoy is thrown out of his house and all his property and land is occupied. The only property left, near the Airport is transformed into a temple. In depression, Shantimoy suffers a heart attack and Sweety gets worried about her father's health. She requests Adi to stop all this but Adi refuses to do so. Sweety gets angry with Adi but later understands and again stays by his side.

In the meantime, Shantimoy calls a famous goon and fisherman, Karthis Das a.k.a. MEchho Karthik to kill Adi and bring back all his property. Mechho Karthik agrees to do so but asks for Sweety's hand in marriage in return. Sweety does not agree to this marriage but Shantimoy finalizes the deal with Karthik. At night, Karthik breaks up the temple in Shantimoy's property and Adi's friends records the video and gives it to the police and Karthik is arrested for breaking up other's property. Later, Shantimoy is arrested for running a chitfun and taking money from the workers illegally. But, Karthik is released from the jail and he decides to kill Adi and marry Sweety. Sweety gets scared and informs Adi about it. Adi ensures Sweety about her safety and tricks Karthik and beats him up.

The film ends as Shantimoy is released from jail and Adi telling him that all his property is still his but everything was just a play to trick him. Shantimoy and Adi's family get together and Adi and Sweety is married.

== Cast ==
- Soham Chakraborty as Aditya
- Pooja Bose as Sweety
- Rajatava Dutta as Sweety's father, Shantimoy Roy
- Tulika Bose as Aditya's mother
- Supriyo Dutta as Aditya's father
- Mintu Mallick as Aditya's friend
- Surojit Bandopadhyay as advocate
- Samidh Mukherjee as Ghatok Thakur
- Biswanath Basu as Swiss Bank Accountant
- Dipankar De as Kaka (Chief Minister)
- Aritra Dutta Banik as Bablu(Shantimoy's Secret Son)

== Soundtrack ==
All music is composed by Samidh Mukerjee.

No.	Title	Lyrics	Singer(s)	Length
1.	"Loveria Title Song"	Samidh Mukherjee	Samidh Mukherjee	4:25
2.	"Jalwa"	Samidh Mukherjee and Priyo Chattopadhyay	Samidh Mukherjee	3:43
3.	"Oh Shonaa"	Samidh Mukherjee	Monali Thakur, Samidh Mukherjee	4:17
4.	"36-24-36"	Samidh Mukherjee	June Banerjee, Samidh Mukherjee	3:42
