= Thana Theke Aschi =

2010 Indian Bengali film

- Directed by: Saran Dutta
- Screenplay by: Saran Dutta
- Story by: Ajit Gangopadhyay
- Produced by: Ajay Jhunjhunwala
- Starring: Parambrata Chatterjee; Rudranil Ghosh; Paoli Dam; Sabyasachi Chakraborty
- Cinematography: Soumik Haldar
- Edited by: Sanjib Dutta
- Music by: Jeet Gannguli
- Production company: Morpheus Media Ventures Pvt. Ltd.
- Release date: 29 January 2010 (Kolkata)
- Country: India
- Language: Bengali

Thana Theke Aschi (transl. Coming from the Police Station) is a 2010 Bengali thriller film directed by Saran Dutta. It is an adaptation of the English play An Inspector Calls. The thriller film was rated 3.5 stars in its review by the Times of India.

== Plot ==
The story revolves around a cop, named Tinkori Haldar who pays a visit to a rich and well known businessman of the town, Amarnath Mullick. After the engagement party between his daughter Rinita and Rajat, and when everyone has left Tinkori Haldar visits and informs them that a woman named Sandhya Mondal has committed suicide in the Goabagan Bustee. Everyone looks astonished and tells they have nothing to do with the case, because they are fully unaware about her. But Haldar tells them she has left behind a diary where all their names (Mr Mullick, his wife, his son Arin, his daughter Rinita and Rajat) are mentioned. Now it is revealed that all of them knew her by different names and had done injustice to her in some way or the other and the mystery starts unfolding. They all tell their own stories of how they had come across Sandhya and had done injustice to her that probably made her commit suicide. After Tinkari Haldar leaves, it is discovered that there is nothing written in the diary and no cop by the name of Tinakari Haldar is there at Padmapukur Thana. However, they soon receive a call from the local thana stating that a woman named Sandhya Mondal had indeed committed suicide at Goabagan Bustee and their names had been found in her diary, and a cop is on his way to interrogate them. All of them wonder then who is actually Tinkori Haldar! and according to Arin, who actually loved her once thinks it is their conscience that had paid them a visit to unfold their true faces and realities of life.

== Cast ==
- Parambrata Chattopadhyay as Arin
- Rudranil Ghosh as Rajat
- Dulal Lahiri as Amarnath Mullick
- Sabyasachi Chakraborty as Tinkari Haldar
- Paoli Dam as Sandhya Mondal
- Alakananda Ray
- Shrabonti Malakar
- Faiman

== Music ==
Thana Theke Aschi

Soundtrack album by Jeet Gannguli
- Released: 2010
- Recorded: 2009
- Studio: Morpheus Media Ventures Pvt. Ltd.
- Genre: Feature film soundtrack
- Producer: Ajay Jhunjhunwala

Jeet Gannguli chronology
Dujone (2009)	Thana Theke Aschi (2010)	Bolo Na Tumi Aamar (2010)

Singles from Thana Theke Aschi

All lyrics are written by Saran Dutta
(Additional verses written by Rabindranath Tagore); all music is composed by Jeet Gannguli.

No.	Title	Singer(s)	Length
1.	"Instrumental"
2.	"Bajai Bashi (Female)"	Shreya Ghosal
3.	"Bajai Bashi (Male)"	Rupankar Bagchi
