= Rishi Chanda =

Indian music director and singer

Rishi Chanda ঋষি চন্দ
- Born: Kolkata, India
- Occupations: Composer; Singer

Rishi Chanda (Bengali: ঋষি চন্দ) is an Indian music director and singer.

== Bengali discography ==
=== Composer ===
Denotes films that have not yet been released

Year	Film	Songs	Notes
2006	Kranti	1 Songs – Aami Banglar Gaan Gai	Debut, Along with Jeet Gannguli, Samidh Mukerjee, Riingo Banerjee, Som
2010	Josh	1 Songs – Josh (Title Track), Korbo Na Biye	Along with Jeet Gannguli, Samidh Mukerjee
2010	Dui Prithibi	2 Songs – Its Only Pyar, Pyarelal	Along with Jeet Gannguli, Samidh Mukerjee
2010	Shedin Dekha Hoyechilo	2 Songs – Khokababu	Along with Jeet Gannguli, Samidh Mukerjee
2012	Om Shanti	Uncredited	Along with Neel Dutt, Bappi Lahiri, Rupam Islam, Nachiketa, Samidh Mukerjee, Rocket Mandol
2012	Khokababu	6 Songs – Dance Mare Khokababu" (Title Track), Amai Ador Kor, Pyar Ka Jhatka, Tore Niye Jai, Mon Kande Pran Kande, Mon Kande Pran Kande (Solo)	Along with Savvy, Priyo Chatterjee
2013	Megh Roddur	4 Songs – Jale Mon, Mon Amour, Ami Achi Tai, Ki Boli Na Boli	
2013	Kanamachi	"All Songs" Except Mon Baawre	Along with Indradeep Dasgupta
2013	Khoka 420	1 Songs – Jay Govinda Jay Gopala	Along with Savvy, Shree Pritam, Shrijit
2013	Bangla Naache Bhangra		Along with Arindam Chatterjee, Raja Narayan Deb, Raga Boyz
2013	Shaada Kaalo Aabcha	"All Songs"	
2013	Majnu	1 Songs – E Mon Ajkal	Along with Samidh Mukerjee, Savvy
2014	Sada Canvas	"All Songs"	
2014	Bangali Babu English Mem	1 Songs – E Ki Prem	Along with Dabbu, Ajoy
2016	Sathiya	5 Songs – Sathiya (Title Song), Ailo Biya Futlo Phool, Sathiya ( Female Version ), Jeene Laga Hoon, Mera Maula Kahan	Along with Adhyan, Rupak
2017	Kaalo Mon(Music Album)	1 Song - Kaalo Mon (Single)	Along with Anindita

=== Singer ===
Denotes films that have not yet been released

Year	Film	Non-film	Songs	Co-singers	Notes
2010	Shedin Dekha Hoyechilo		Khokababu Title Track	Samidh Mukerjee	Debut
2012	Khokababu		Dance Mare Khokababu" (Title Track)	Solo	
2012	Khokababu		Mon Kande Pran Kande	Roop Kumar Rathod	
2013	Megh Roddur		Ami Achi Tai	Solo	
2013	Kanamachi		Kanamachi Title Track	Kunal Ganjawala	
2013	Ashchorjyo Prodeep		Ashchorjyo Prodeep Title Song	Timir Biswas, Sukanya Ghosh	
2013	Majnu		E Mon Ajkal	Jonita Gandhi	
2014	Bangali Babu English Mem		E Ki Prem	Solo	
2015		Chena ( Cover, Single )	Chena	#abhikism	
2016	Sathiya		Sathiya (Title Song), Jeene Laga Hoon, Mera Maula Kahan	Aditi Paul	
