= 100% Love (2012 film) =

Bengali film by Rabi Kinagi (2012)

- Theatrical poster
- Directed by: Rabi Kinagi
- Written by: Selvaraghavan (Story)
- Screenplay by: Rabi Kinagi
- Produced by: Shree Venkatesh Films; Jeet
- Starring: Jeet; Koel
- Cinematography: Mohan Verma
- Edited by: Mohammad Kalam
- Music by: Jeet Gannguli; Samidh Mukerjee
- Production companies: Shree Venkatesh Films; Grassroot Entertainment Pvt. Ltd
- Distributed by: Shree Venkatesh Films; Grassroot Entertainment Pvt. Ltd
- Release date: 20 January 2012
- Country: India
- Language: Bengali
- Box office: ₹4 crore

100% Love is a 2012 Indian Bengali-language romantic comedy drama film directed by Rabi Kinagi, who also wrote the screenplay. The film is a remake of the 2007 Telugu film Aadavari Matalaku Arthale Verule and starred Jeet and Koel in the lead roles. 100% Love was released on 20 January 2012. This films marks Jeet's debut as producer.

== Plot ==
Rahul is from a middle-class family. He makes several bids to get a job, but all were in vain due to his poor language skills and inadequate educational qualifications. As his friends start to all settle down in life, he continues to struggle to secure employment. Rahul has two good friends, Abhi and Kartik. His father, a teacher, always chides him for being irresponsible, adding to his frustation.

At this juncture, Rahul catches a glimpse of Anuradha and it is love at first sight for him. He learns that she works for a software solutions firm. Luckily for him, Rahul finally secures employment in the same firm. He soon realises that Anu is a short-tempered young woman. While working on the PC, Rahul accidentally presses the keys on the PC, which eventually malfunctions the software and results in a glitch. On asking who is his trainer, Anu comes in sight, and the main boss angrily blames Anu for the mess caused and warns her to complete the deadline by tomorrow otherwise she will lose her job. This shocks Rahul, and he decides to recover the lost data which he successfully recovers on time. Once, Rahul accompanies her, along with two other colleagues to Australia, he reveals his feelings for her. She refuses him, saying that she comes from an orthodox family and her marriage is set for the next month.

A depressed Rahul returns to India. Unable to bear seeing his son so despondent, his father meets Anu. She confronts him for recommending his son's love and accidentally slaps both Rahul and his father. That night, Rahul's father dies of a heart attack and after the cremation of his father, Rahul gets shattered and blames himself for his father's death, thinking that the death was caused due to sharing his feelings with Anu. In order to help lighten Rahul's mood, Abhi takes him to his village for his marriage. Anu happens to be the girl Abhi is to marry, so Rahul learns that his colleague is marrying his friend. Though Rahul and Anu pretends to be unknown to each other for the slapping incident and therefore, Rahul starts avoiding Anu. After learning about Rahul's father's death from Abhi, Anu breaks down in tears, blaming herself responsible for his father's death. Abhi narrates about Anu to Rahul. A few years ago, their grandfather's thought of getting them married early, but was put aside because Abhi and Anu left the house to seek their own identities. This had aggravated the grandfather.

After a couple of years, the parents of Anu and Abhi decide to have them marry to appease their grandfather. Rahul feels at home with Abhi's loving family and feels happy. But suddenly Soniya, Abhi's little sister, falls in love with Rahul. Anu gets jealous and realises that she does indeed love Rahul. When Rahul saves the family from a bunch of goons, Abhi and Anu's grandfather accepts him into the family. Anu asks Rahul to forgive her as she feels guilty about slapping Rahul's father as she blames herself responsible for his death. Eventually, Rahul does and Tells her it's not her fault he died due to massive heart attack, after this they start talking.

One day Sonia decides to go to the city for some work. Anu worrying about Rahul decides to accompany them by herself driving the car. On their way Anu notices that Sonia is trying to come closer to Rahul. On a bumpy road Sonia accidentally kisses Rahul which angers Anu. She halts the car and tells Rahul privately that its going out of hand now, Rahul also feels the same and agrees. As he explains this about to Sonia she felts heartbroken and attempts to commit suicide by jumping off in a pond, Rahul saves her on time. As she regains consciousness Rahul slaps sonia and tells her that its not love its just a crush. Rahul also tell her after she will join the college she will get much handsome boy than him and every guy will be crazy for her. After seeing all these Anu realises that he still loves her but he is avoiding her.

The day before the wedding, Anu runs to Rahul. Rahul asks her to forget him because he believes that it would create problems in their happy family; Anu hugs Rahul. Abhi's grandfather notices them conversing and admonishes Anuradha for bringing disrepute to their family and asks Rahul to leave his house, as he accused him of having affair. Rahul gets ready to leave and at that moment, he sees everyone putting down the decorations for the wedding. Rahul tries to stop them from putting down the decoration, but Abhi, who also accuses Rahul of having affair with and steal his to-be wife Anu, breaks friendship with Rahul and tells him to go away. Rahul also requests Abhi to marry Anu and keep her happy.

While Rahul is walking on his way to the train station, the bunch of goons he saved the family from, sticks a knife in him and he is taken to hospital. Kartik tells everyone at Abhi and Anu's wedding that Rahul is hospitalized after being attacked by the goons. He also sarcastically tells that he forgot that Abhi doesn't like Rahul and learns that they are no more friends. Everyone, including Abhi, slowly leaves to go to the hospital, except Anu and her grandfather. Anu says that she will never disobey her grandfather and afterwards, they both went to the hospital. In the hospital, Rahul wakes up to go to the station. When he is ready to go, he sees that everyone is outside his room. Finally, everyone realises that Anu and Rahul are made for each other, so they get married at last and this is how the film ends.

== Cast ==
- Jeet as Rahul Mazumder
- Koel as Anuradha
- Sujoy Ghosh as Abhi
- Biswanath Basu as Kartik, Abhi and Rahul's friend
- Supriyo Dutta as Rahul's Father
- Biswajit Chakraborty as Abhi's Grandfather
- Rittika Sen as Soniya
- Kamalika Banerjee as Abhi's aunt
- Moushumi Saha as Abhi's Mother

== Soundtrack ==
100% Love

Soundtrack album by Jeet Gannguli, Samidh Mukerjee
- Released: 20 January 2012
- Recorded: 2011
- Genre: Feature film soundtrack
- Language: Bengali
- Labels: SVF (2011–2023); Grassroot Entertainment (2023–present)
- Producers: Shree Venkatesh Films, Grassroot Entertainment

Singles from 100% Love
- 1. "100% Love (Title Track)" Released: 17 December 2011; 2. "Tumse Pyar Hai Already" Released: 24 December 2011; 3. "Ek Mutho Swapno" Released: 31 December 2011; 4. "Hridoy Shekhe Bhalobasha" Released: 21 January 2012; 5. "Hiya Zole Piyaar Dorode" Released: 25 January 2012; 6. "Yeh Sala Dil Hai" Released: 17 March 2016

Jeet Gannguli chronology
System (2011)	100% Love (2012)	Le Halua Le (2012)

Samidh Mukerjee chronology
Om Shanti (2012)	100% Love (2012)	Macho Mustanaa (2012)

All Songs Hits in West Bengal.

All lyrics are written by Raja Chanda, Chandrani Gannguli, Sandip Nath; all music is composed by Jeet Gannguli, Samidh Mukerjee.

Track listing
No.	Title	Lyrics	Music	Singer(s)	Length
1.	"Hridoy Shekhe Bhalobasha"		Jeet Gannguli	Saptak Bhattacharjee	4:06
2.	"Tumse Pyar Hai Already"		Samidh Mukerjee	Samidh Mukerjee & Anweshaa	3:42
3.	"100% Love (Title Track)"	Raja Chanda	Jeet Gannguli	Jeet Gannguli, Monali Thakur	3:47
4.	"Ek Mutho Swapno"	Chandrani Gannguli	Jeet Gannguli	Jeet Gannguli	4:12
5.	"Hiya Zole Piyaar Dorode"		Samidh Mukerjee	Samidh Mukerjee & Ratna Basu	3:41
6.	"Yeh Sala Dil Hai"	Raja Chanda, Sandip Nath	Jeet Gannguli	Jeet Gannguli	3:42

== Reception ==
The Indian Express and The Times of India both gave mixed reviews, with The Times of India praising the chemistry of Jeet and Koel.
