= Shedin Dekha Hoyechilo =

2010 Indian Bengali film by Sujit Mondal

Sedin Dekha Hoyechilo
- Poster
- Directed by: Sujit Mondal
- Written by: N. K. Salil
- Screenplay by: N. K. Salil
- Produced by: Shrikant Mohta
- Starring: Dev; Srabanti Chatterjee; Tapas Paul; Premjit; Kaushik Banerjee; Mousumi Saha; Laboni Sarkar
- Cinematography: Mohan D. Verma
- Edited by: Raviranjan Maitra
- Music by: Songs: Jeet Gannguli; Samidh-Rishi; Background score: Sanjoy Chowdhury
- Production company: Shree Venkatesh Films
- Distributed by: Shree Venkatesh Films
- Release date: 24 December 2010
- Running time: 160 minutes
- Country: India
- Language: Bengali

Shedin Dekha Hoyechilo (English: We met that day) is a 2010 Indian Bengali-language romantic action film directed by Sujit Mondal. Produced by Shrikant Mohta, under the banner of Shree Venkatesh Films, the film stars Dev and Srabanti Chatterjee in lead roles while Tapas Paul, Laboni Sarkar, Prasun Gain, Kaushik Banerjee, Shakuntala Barua in supporting roles. It is a remake of the 2008 Telugu film Parugu.

The soundtrack of the film was composed by Jeet Gannguli and Samidh- Rishi, while the screenplay and dialogues were written by N. K. Salil. Initially the film name was Tule Niye Jabo Jokhon Bhalo Beshechi, but later changed as Shedin Dekha Hoyechilo.

== Plot ==
Nilkanta Roy is a revered person in the village situated that he resides in North Bengal. His daughters Kabita and Nandini, are more than anything for him in the world. Kabita loves a native called Ajoy, with whom she elopes to Digha on the night of her arranged marriage ceremony. Nilakanta's younger brother Bikash suspects that Ajoy's friends are involved in this incident. Kartik, one of the closest friend of Ajoy, who resides in the same village, gets interrogated brutally about the whereabouts of Ajoy's companions. He reveals that three more people, Abir Chatterjee from Kolkata, Shankar Ghosh from Howrah, Arun Das from Haldia and Subhas Saha from Burdwan, also may have helped the couple elope. By mistaken reference of initials in the names, Subhas Basu was kidnapped from Burdwan, while the original man was left untouched and Arun couldn't be caught from Haldia as he was out of town that time. In Kolkata, a drunk Abir is kidnapped at night near his house, who is notoriously known for being a nomad and an expert in escaping. They are imprisoned at a small penthouse in Nilkanta's residence, and all of them plan to escape the next early morning by catching a train to Kolkata. While all others almost approach the train the next morning, Abir stops when he sees Nandini at the village temple situated in the mid-forest and falls in love with her, though she is unaware of his presence. They all are kidnapped yet again by Nilakanta's men and are imprisoned at that penthouse. Its doors remain locked, and only three windows are there where a man can see the entrance door of the main house and the nearby flooring and parking area. While his friends are horrified, Abir is not influenced by the fact that he is in love with a village native and on eloping with her, all of them have to face big trouble from the villagers. Meanwhile, Nandini tries to speak with them with an intention to find out details about Kabita, and neither Abir nor his friends can see her face because of the penthouse's style of construction.

He asks her to help him find his love and, in return promises her to tell details about Nandini's whereabouts. The added advantage to Abir is a set of love letters received by Kabita from Ajoy, which are presently in his custody, and Nandini is hell bent recovering them back. Meanwhile, Arun is caught red-handed from Haldia, who, after execution of brutal force by Nilakanta's men, reveals that the couple is in Digha. There Abir manages to send the couple to Kolkata without the knowledge of Nilakanta's henchmen and later at the penthouse, he reveals he is the mastermind behind the act of Kabita eloping with Ajoy, which is heard by Nandini, who hid there to steal the set of love letters and escaped through the back door. She burns up all the letters and reveals all the facts she heard in the penthouse to her maid-servant. All on a sudden, to her surprise, Nandini's uncle Bikash appears there and listens all of these. Because of her, the truth is revealed, and Abir too, finds out that his love is none other than Nandini. When Abir and his friends are brutally tortured, he speaks the truth that the couple are in Kolkata to save his friends. He also reveals that they will marry the next day at temple. Nilkanta, Bikash, Nandini, and others go to Kolkata including Abir and his friends. All of them start searching for the couple at the temple, but when they leaves the place, Kabita and Ajoy reaches there. They did not draw attention of Nilkanta and others. Eventually Abir earns the trust of Nilkanta, his henchmen, and Nandini by saving her from a bunch of goons who try to molest her, and she slowly starts reciprocating his love, though never confesses it. Abir suggests Nilkanta and the others to stay at his home and tells everything to his mother. Abir begins to realise the pain faced by Nilkanta because of Kabita's wrongdoings. The next day, Nilkanta and Abir manage to catch Kabita and Ajoy red-handed at the Prinsep Ghat, and there, Kabita revolts against her father addressing him as a 'chasing dog' in front of everyone and threatens to file a police case on him. In dejection, Nilkanta leaves the place and Abir watches on. During the day of their return to North Bengal, everyone parts ways with Nilkanta apologising to Abir and his friends, and invites them to Nandini's marriage. Nandini stares at Abir, waiting to confess her love, though Abir stands like a statue there till the car leaves for North Bengal.

Seeing his son leading a lazy, dull and unexcited life against the way he lived makes Abir's mother sends him away to bring Nandini as his wife. With Shankar, Subhas, Arun and Raju pressurising him, Abir goes with his friends to attend the marriage. While Nilkanta is afraid Nandini would elope with Abir this night, Abir confronts Nilkanta, confesses his love for Nandini, and assures he would not elope with her. Then Abir decides to go back to Kolkata and reaches the railway station. To his surprise, he meets Nilkanta and Nandini on the platform. Realizing that Nandini's happiness lies in Abir's company, he lets the lovers unite that night. The couple takes blessings from Nilkanta and the film ends.

== Cast ==
- Dev as Abir Chatterjee
- Srabanti Chatterjee as Nandini
- Tapas Paul as Nilkanta Roy, Kabita and Nandini's father
- Premjit Mukherjee as Bikash Roy, Nilkanta's younger Brother
- Kaushik Banerjee as Nilkanta's Brother
- Laboni Sarkar as Abir's Mother
- Shakuntala Barua as Nilkanta's mother, Kabita and Nandini's Grandmother
- Mousumi Saha as Sabita Roy, Kabita and Nandini's mother as well as Nilkanta's Wife
- Prasun Gain as Shankar Ghosh, Abir's friend
- Pradip Dhar as Barun Das, Abir's friend
- Parthasarathi Chakraborty as Subhas Basu, Abir's friend
- Raju Majumdar as Kartik, Abir's friend
- Gopal Talukdar as Ajoy, Kabita's lover and Abir's friend
- M. N. Raj as Subhas Saha, Abir's friend

=== Special appearance ===
- Kanchan Mullick as Premkirti Das, an auto-rickshaw driver
- Supriyo Dutta as Inspector Biswanath Khashnobish

== Soundtrack ==
Shedin Dekha Hoyechilo

Soundtrack album by Jeet Gannguli, Rishi-Samidh (for the song Khokababu)
- Released: 24 December 2010
- Studio: Shree Venkatesh Films
- Genre: film
- Producers: Srikanta Mehta, Shree Venkatesh Films

Singles from Shedin Dekha Hoyechilo
- 1. "Shedin Dekha Hoyechilo Title Track" Released: 19 November 2010; 2. "Mon Hariye Beghore" Released: 26 November 2010; 3. "Khokababu" Released: 4 December 2010; 4. "Hentechi Swapner Hath Dhorey" Released: 11 December 2010; 5. "Ea Jibone Prem Sei Proshno" Released: 9 January 2011

Jeet Gannguli chronology
Mon Je Kore Uru Uru (2010)	Shedin Dekha Hoyechilo (2010)	Kellafate (2010)

Samidh Mukerjee chronology
Dui Prithibi (2010)	Shedin Dekha Hoyechilo (2010)	Faande Poriya Boga Kaande Re (2011)

Rishi Chanda chronology
Dui Prithibi (2010)	Shedin Dekha Hoyechilo (2010)	Om Shanti (2012)

The music of the film has been composed by Jeet Gannguli and Samidh-Rishi. The lyrics are penned by Chandrani Gannguli, Samidh Mukerjee, Prasen (Prasenjit Mukherjee) and Priyo Chatterjee.

No.	Title	Lyrics	Music	Singer(s)	Length
1.	"Shedin Dekha Hoyechilo"	Chandrani Gannguli	Jeet Gannguli	Kunal Ganjawala	04:20
2.	"Khokababu Jaay"	Samidh Mukerjee	Samidh-Rishi	Samidh Mukherjee; Rishi Chanda	04:49
3.	"Mon Hariye Beghorey"	Prasen	Jeet Gannguli	Mohit Chauhan	04:23
4.	"Hetechi Swapner Haat Dhore"	Chandrani Gannguli	Jeet Gannguli	Javed Ali; June Banerjee; Dipayan Dasgupta	04:37
5.	"E Jibone Prem Sei Proshno"	Priyo Chattopadhyay	Jeet Gannguli	Jeet Gannguli	03:49
