= Samidh Mukerjee =

- Born: সমিধ মুখার্জি Kolkata, India
- Genres: Filmy; Bengali film base; Pop; Rock; Bengali remixes and dubstep; Classical
- Occupations: Music director, singer songwriter
- Years active: 2001–present

Samidh Mukerjee (also spelled Mukerjee, Bengali: সমিধ মুখোপাধ্যায়) is an Indian singer, songwriter and composer from Kolkata, India. Mukerjee mainly works on Bengali- and Hindi-language films and television shows. He is also a part of the Bengali music director's duo Samidh-Rishi.

== Career ==
Later in his career Mukerjee composed many popular songs for Bengali and Hindi films. Some of his successful projects as a music composer are Macho Mustanaa, Loveria, Kranti, Josh, Dui Prithibi, Shedin Dekha Hoyechilo, 100% Love, Om Shanti, Majnu, Faande Poriya Boga Kaande Re, Sadak 2 etc.

His debut music album Amar Blue Sunglass was released in 2012 from Remac Muzik. Amar Blue Sunglass has seven different genres of songs written, composed and sung by Mukerjee himself.

Singers from Hindi film and music industry like, Shreya Ghoshal, Sunidhi Chauhan, Kunal Ganjawala and many more sang under Mukerjee's music direction in the film Macho Mustanaa. Shreya Ghoshal sang the song "Jaane Jaana" from the film Macho Mustanaa in Mukerjee's composition. Usha Uthup also sang in Mukerjee's composition. Kalpana Patowary was nominated as Best Female Playback Singer in 12th Tele-Cine Award, Kolkata for Mukerjee's composition "Koka Kola" from Bengali film Faande Poriya Boga Kaande Re.

Mukerjee appeared as an actor in Bengali film Loveria, which was released in 2013.

Mukerjee was featured in a song with Rakhi Sawant in the Bengali film Om Shanti. The song was composed and sung by Mukerjee himself.

Apart from acting, Mukerjee participated in the Bangla version (regional version) of the dancing reality show (dancing competition) Jhalak Dikhhla Jaa, which was aired in ETV Bangla. Mukerjee was one of the finalists of the show.

Mukerjee was last seen in television as a contestant of Zee Bangla's Dance Bangla Dance Season 8. He was among the finalists of the show.

Mukerjee recently composed two songs for Pallavi Chatterjee's album Folk Sutra.

== Awards ==
Samidh Mukerjee got Fever 104 FM Best Music Director Award for the film Shedin Dekha Hoyechilo.
Samidh Mukerjee was nominated for Best Music Director Award for the film Loveria (Tele Cine Awards 2013).

== Filmography ==
Denotes films that have not yet been released

Year	Film	Songs	Notes	Language
2006	Kranti	1 Songs – Aami Banglar Gaan Gai	Along with Jeet Gannguli, Som, Rishi Chanda, Riingo Banerjee	Bengali
2010	Josh	"Josh Title Track", "Korbo Na Biye"	Along with Jeet Gannguli, Rishi Chanda	Bengali
2010	Dui Prithibi	"Its Only Pyar", "Pyarelal"	Along with Jeet Gannguli, Rishi Chanda	Bengali
2010	Shedin Dekha Hoyechilo	"Khokababu"	Along with Jeet Gannguli,	Bengali
2011	Faande Poriya Boga Kaande Re	"Koka Kola"	Along with Jeet Gannguli	Bengali
2012	Om Shanti	"Nila Na Pila Na Lal Gulabi"	Along with Rocket Mandal, Rishi Chanda	Bengali
2012	100% Love	"Tumse Pyar Hai Already", "Hiya Jwale Piyar Dorode (Jwalere)", "Yeh Sala Dil Hai"	Along with Jeet Gannguli	Bengali
2012	Macho Mustanaa	"All Songs"	No One	Bengali
2013	Loveria	"All Songs"	No One	Bengali
2013	Majnu	"E Mon Ajkal", "Phokir Mon"	Along with Rishi Chanda, Savvy Gupta	Bengali
2017	Namkeen Girl	"Namkeen Girl(Title Track)	No One	Hindi
2018	Boxer	All Songs	No One	Bengali
2019	Jah Kala	All Songs	No One	Bengali
2020	Sadak 2	3 Songs – Dil Ki Purani Sadak, Purani Sadak (Reprise), Dil Ki Purani (Unplugged)	Urvi, Jeet Gannguli, Ankit Tiwari, Suniljeet	Hindi
2025	Jhor	2 Songs – Bum (Item song), Oh jane jaan (Love Song)	No One	Bengali

== Music album ==
Denotes films that have not yet been released

Year	Title	Singer	Compose	Notes
2012	Amar Blue Sunglass	"Himself"	"Himself"	Remac Muzik
2014	Folk Sutra	"Pallavi Chatterjee"	"Himself"	Purple Leaf Entertainment
2017	Namkeen Girl	Himself & Rani Indrani	"Himself"	Eco Music Production

== Television ==
Denotes films that have not yet been released

Year	Show	Channel	Year	Notes
2012	Jhalak Dikhhla Jaa	"ETV Bangla"	"2013"	
2012	Dance Bangla Dance	"Zee Bangla"		
2025	Sonar Jalsha Ghar	Zee Bangla Sonar		
