= Josh (2010 film) =

2010 Indian action drama Bengali film

- Josh Movie Poster
- Directed by: Ravi Kinnagi
- Screenplay by: N. K. Salil
- Dialogues by: N. K. Salil
- Produced by: Shrikant Mohta; Nispal Singh
- Starring: Jeet; Srabanti Chatterjee; Tapas Paul; Puneet Issar; Supriyo Dutta; Laboni Sarkar; Haradhan Banerjee; Anshuman Gupta
- Cinematography: Kumud Verma
- Edited by: Rabi Ranjan Maitra
- Music by: Songs: Jeet Gannguli; Samidh-Rishi Score: Jeet Gannguli; S. P. Venkatesh
- Production company: Shree Venkatesh Films
- Distributed by: Shree Venkatesh Films; Surinder Films
- Release date: 30 July 2010
- Running time: 150 minutes
- Country: India
- Language: Bengali
- Box office: Rs 5 crore

Josh (transl. Zeal) is a 2010 Indian Bengali-language action drama film directed by Ravi Kinagi. Jointly produced by Shrikant Mohta and Nispal Singh under the banners of Shree Venkatesh Films and Surinder Films, respectively. It is a remake of the 2005 Telugu film Bhadra. The film stars Jeet, Srabanti Chatterjee, Tapas Paul, Puneet Issar and Laboni Sarkar in lead roles.

The soundtrack of the film was composed by Jeet Gannguli and Samidh-Rishi, while the background score was by S.P Venkatesh. It follows the journey of Indra, a talented engineering student with a little carefree attitude, taking revenges after being a witness of the violent murder of his best friend Rajib and his family excluding his sister Anuradha as they protested and fought against the land scams and torture done on the farmers by a landlord as well as a criminal named Rudra, in Prantik, near Bolpur.

The screenplay and dialogues were written by N.K Salil, with cinematography handled by Kumud Verma and editing by Rabiranjan Maitra. The action sequences were designed by Judo Ramu, while dance was choreographed by Duraiswamy Shankaraiyaa and Baba Yadav.

== Plot ==
Indradeep Chowdhury aka Indra is a free-spirited, no-nonsense engineering student at Kharagpur Engineering College. He returns to his home in Kolkata for his younger sister's wedding, bringing along the distraught and frightened Anuradha alias Anu, whom he introduces as a friend. Although the family initially suspects her, Anu gradually becomes close to everyone, particularly Indra's nephew and niece. His sister-in-law and younger sister also befriend her, while Indra's grandfather senses a loving relationship developing between Indra and Anu.

After the wedding, Binay Ganguly, a family friend of Indra's father, insults Anu and offers her money to leave Indra. He had intended to make Indra his son-in-law by marrying him to his daughter Lisa. Furious, Indra confronts Binay and promises to marry Anu regardless. Later, while Indra and Anu are out eating, goons attack them. Enraged, Indra defeats and pursues them, only to return and discover that Anu has disappeared. Deeply despondent, he is taken home by his father, who forces him to reveal Anu's identity and his past.

The film goes to a flashback, where Indra, Trisha Mukherjee and Rajib Chowdhury are close friends at the same college. During winter vacation, Indra visits Rajib's village near Prantik, near Bolpur. Anu, Rajib's sister, has returned from London and is impressed by Indra, who shares her interests and quickly wins over her family. Indra convinces them that he would be a suitable groom for Anu.

Anu's brother Surya Narayan is revered by the village farmers for opposing land scams and abuses committed by the gangster Rudra and his brother Nikhil, known as the 'Terror of Bolpur'. When Anu secretly takes Indra to a temple, Nikhil and his gang attack them and seize Anu. Indra defeats the attackers and rescues her. Surya Narayan then explains the violence afflicting the village. Despite holding a master's degree from a prestigious university in Pune and having a wife with a master's degree in integrated mathematics, he remains committed to helping the villagers and maintaining his noble ideals.

At a village fair during Saraswati Puja, Rudra and his gang brutally murder Surya Narayan and his wife. Indra escapes towards the railway station with Rajib and Anu. When the gang attacks them again, Indra discovers that Nikhil has stabbed Rajib. In a rage, Indra kills Nikhil and carries the severely injured Rajib to the station with Anu. Rajib dies from his wounds on the platform, after Indra promises to take responsibility for Anu and eventually marry her. Indra then flees with Anu to Kolkata by train as Rudra's men pursue them.

Having killed Nikhil, Indra becomes Rudra's enemy. Haunted by his brother's death, Rudra orders his men to find Indra. They trace him to Kharagpur Engineering College and then Kolkata, prompting the college authorities to warn Indra. He subsequently removes his identity from the electoral roll and other records.

In the present, Mangal, Surya Narayan's trusted assistant, reaches Indra's home and brings Anu before the family, explaining that he has secretly been tracking them for their protection. Fearing for her safety, Indra decides to send Anu to London, although she resists because she loves him. At the airport, Anu meets Trisha, who has come to Kolkata to find Indra and Rajib. Trisha tells her of Indra's devotion and reveals that Anu's family had chosen him as her bridegroom before their deaths. Realising she cannot leave Indra, Anu returns and finds him fighting Rudra and his men to avenge Rajib and his family. Indra defeats Rudra, after which he and Anu reunite and leave together, while Mangal kills Rudra.

== Cast ==
- Jeet as Indradeep Chowdhury aka Indra
- Srabanti Chatterjee as Anuradha Chatterjee aka Anu
- Tapas Paul as Surya Narayan Chatterjee, Anu's elder brother, Agriculture Minister
- Puneet Issar as Rudra, the main antagonist
- Laboni Sarkar as Madhabi Chatterjee, Surya Narayan's wife
- Angshuman Gupta as Rajib Chatterjee, Surya Narayan's younger brother and Anu's elder brother
- Haradhan Bandopadhyay as Indra's grandfather
- Bharat Kaul as Nikhil, Rudra's younger brother
- Supriyo Dutta as Mangal, Surya Narayan's assistant
- Sumit Ganguly as Gabbar Bhai
- Debaparna Chakraborty as Divya Chowdhury, Indra's sister
- Joy Badlani as Binay Ganguly
- Srabanti Malakar as Indra's sister-in-law
- Anindita Banerjee as Lisa Ganguly, Binay's daughter
- Arun Chakraborty as Mr. Chowdhury, Indra's father
- Geeta Mukherjee as Mrs. Chowdhury, Indra's mother
- Moushumi Das as Sabitri, Mangal's sister and Rajib's love interest
- Amitabha Bhattacharya as Ranadeep Chowdhury, Indra's elder brother

=== Special appearance ===
- Sandhita Chatterjee as Trisha Mukherjee
- Judo Ramu as the shooter in the village fair

== Soundtrack ==
Josh

Soundtrack album by Jeet Gannguli, Samidh-Rishi
- Released: 30 July 2010
- Recorded: December 2009
- Studio: Shree Venkatesh Films
- Genre: Feature film soundtrack
- Language: Bengali
- Label: Shree Venkatesh Films
- Director: Ravi Kinagi
- Producer: Shree Venkatesh Films

Jeet Gannguli chronology
Kellafate (2010)	Josh (2010)	Paglu (2011)

Samidh-Rishi chronology
Kranti (2006)	Josh (2010)	Dui Prithibi (2010)

Singles from Josh
- 1. "Khujechi Toke Raat Berate" Released: 24 June 2010; 2. "Keu Mone Mone" Released: 13 July 2010; 3. "Sexy Meye" Released: 14 July 2010; 4. "Keno Aaj Kal"; 5. "Pirit Korish Na"

All lyrics are written by Prasen (Prasenjit Mukherjee), Samidh Mukerjee, Priyo Chattopadhya; all music is composed by Jeet Gannguli and Samidh-Rishi.

Track listing
No.	Title	Lyrics	Music	Singer(s)	Length
1.	"Keno Aaj Kal"	Srijit Mukherji	Jeet Gannguli	Nachiketa Chakraborty	3:53
2.	"Keu Mone Mone"	Prasen	Jeet Gannguli	Shaan, Monali Thakur, Pamela Jain	2:17
3.	"Josh Title Track (not used in the film)"	Samidh Mukerjee	Samidh-Rishi	Samidh-Rishi
4.	"Sexy Meye"	Samidh Mukerjee	Samidh-Rishi	Samidh-Rishi	2:48
5.	"Khujechi Toke Raat Berate"	Prasen	Jeet Gannguli	Jeet Gannguli	4:22
6.	"Pirit Korish Na"	Priyo Chattopadhyay	Jeet Gannguli	Rana Mazumder	3:55
