= Kellafate =

2010 Indian Bengali film

- Promotional poster
- Directed by: Sujit Guha
- Written by: N.K. Salil
- Produced by: Prince Entertainment P4
- Starring: Ankush Hazra; Rupashree; Rajatava Dutta
- Cinematography: Rajeeb Srivastav
- Edited by: M. Sushmit
- Music by: Jeet Gannguli
- Production company: Prince Entertainment P4
- Distributed by: Prince Entertainment P4
- Release date: 7 January 2011
- Running time: 2 hours 40 minutes
- Country: India
- Language: Bengali

Kellafate is a 2011 Indian film in the Bengali language romantic comedy film directed by Pijush Saha. The movie is a remake of 2007 Telugu movie Aata. It marked the debut of Ankush Hazra.

== Plot ==
Shibhu works in Kolkata as a projector machine operator, but he dreams of becoming a movie actor. Soon, he falls in love with Pallabi, who is already committed to Bobby, the home minister's son.

== Cast ==
- Ankush Hazra as Shibu
- Rupashree as Pallabi
- Rajatava Dutta as Police Officer
- Supriyo Dutta as Home Minister
- Biswajit Chakraborty
- Surajit Sen

== Music ==
Kellafate

Soundtrack album by Jeet Gannguli
- Released: 2010
- Recorded: 2010
- Studio: Prince Entertainment P4
- Genre: Feature film soundtrack
- Producer: Prince Entertainment P4

Jeet Gannguli chronology
Shedin Dekha Hoyechilo (2010)	Kellafate (2010)	Josh (2010)

Singles from Kellafate
- 1. "Kellafate Title Track" Released: 21 Jan 2019; 2. "Ei Path Chola" Released: 22 Jan 2019; 3. "Premer Gale Chumma De" Released: 22 Jan 2019; 4. "I am in love" Released: 22 Jan 2019; 5. "Jibonta Mela Re Bhai" Released: 22 Jan 2019

All lyrics are written by Prasen (Prasenjit Mukherjee), Priyo Chattopadhyay; all music is composed by Jeet Gannguli.

No.	Title	Lyrics	Singer(s)	Length
1.	"I Am In Love"	Prasen (Prasenjit Mukherjee)	Shreya Ghoshal, Dibyendu Mukherjee	4:45
2.	"Ei Path Chola"	Prasen (Prasenjit Mukherjee)	Kunal Ganjawala, Gayatri Ganjawala	4:26
3.	"Jibon Je Mela Re Bhai"	Priyo Chattopadhyay	Jeet Gannguli, Monali Thakur	4:13
4.	"Kellafate Title Track"	Priyo Chattopadhyay	Jeet Gannguli	3:57
5.	"Lal Gaanda Phool"	Priyo Chattopadhyay	Monali Thakur
6.	"Premer Gale Chuma De"	Prasen (Prasenjit Mukherjee)	Abhijeet Bhattacharya, Monali Thakur	4:46
