= List of Shree Venkatesh Films productions =

SVF Official Logo

Shree Venkatesh Films is an Indian film production and distribution company established in 1995, and founded by Shrikant Mohta and Mahendra Soni. Based in West Bengal, this entertainment media company has produced and distributed movies in Eastern India in Bengali, Hindi and English languages.

== 1996–2000 ==
Year	Film	Director(s)	Cast	Note
1996	Sakhi Tumi Kar	Swapan Saha	Prosenjit Chatterjee, Satabdi Roy	
1996	Bhai Amar Bhai	Swapan Saha	Prosenjit Chatterjee, Chiranjeet Chakraborty	
1997	Mayar Badhon	Swapan Saha	Prosenjit Chatterjee, Rituparna Sengupta	
1997	Sabar Upare Maa	Swapan Saha	Chiranjeet Chakraborty, Abhishek Chatterjee	
1998	Ajab Gayer Ajab Katha	Tapan Sinha	Soumitra Chatterjee, Debashree Roy	
1998	Ranokhetro	Haranath Chakraborty	Prosenjit Chatterjee, Satabdi Roy	
1998	Nag Nagini	Swapan Saha	Abhishek Chatterjee, Sreelekha Mitra	
1999	Goriber Raja Robin Hood	Delwar Jahan Jhantu	Satabdi Roy	
1999	Shotru Dhongsho	Delwar Jahan Jhantu	Shakil Khan, Bhagyashree	
1999	Tumi Ele Tai	Prabhat Roy	Prosenjit Chatterjee, Rituparna Sengupta, Arpita Chatterjee	
2000	Sasurbari Zindabad	Haranath Chakraborty	Prosenjit Chatterjee, Rituparna Sengupta	

== 2001–2005 ==
Year	Film	Director(s)	Cast	Note
2001	Dada Thakur	Haranath Chakraborty	Ferdous Ahmed, Arpita Pal, Tota Roy Chowdhury, Rajesh Sharma, Victor Banerjee, Ranjit Mallick	
2001	Pratibad	Haranath Chakraborty	Prosenjit Chatterjee, Ranjit Mallick, Arpita Pal	
2002	Sathi	Haranath Chakraborty	Jeet, Priyanka Trivedi, Ranjit Mallick	Remake of Tamil film Thullatha Manamum Thullum
2003	Champion	Ravi Kinagi	Jeet, Srabanti Chatterjee	Remake of Telugu Thammudu which itself was a remake of 1992 Hindi film Jo Jeeta Wohi Sikandar
2003	Chokher Bali	Rituparno Ghosh	Prosenjit Chatterjee, Aishwarya Rai, Raima Sen	Based on Rabindranath Tagore's Novel Chokher Bali
2003	Sangee	Haranath Chakraborty	Jeet, Silajit, Priyanka Trivedi	Remake of Tamil Film Kannedhirey Thondrinal
2004	Raincoat	Rituparno Ghosh	Ajay Devgan, Aishwarya Rai, Annu Kapoor	Based on O. Henry's short story The Gift of the Magi
2004	Bandhan	Ravi Kinagi	Jeet, Koel Mallick	Remake of Telugu film Santosham and Tamil film Unnai Thedi'
2004	Mastan	Ravi Kinagi	Jeet, Swastika Mukherjee, Mihir Das	
2004	Premi	Ravi Kinagi	Jeet, Jissu Sengupta, Chandana Sharma	
2005	Yuddho	Ravi Kinagi	Mithun Chakraborty, Jeet, Koel Mallick, Debashree Roy	
2005	Shubhodrishti	Prabhat Roy	Jeet, Koel Mallick	

== 2006–2010 ==
Year	Film	Director(s)	Cast	Note
2006	MLA Fatakeshto	Swapan Saha	Mithun Chakraborty, Debashree Roy, Rajatava Dutta, Koel Mallick	
2006	Kranti	Riingo Banerjee	Jeet, Swastika Mukherjee	
2006	Refugee	Haranath Chakraborty	Prosenjit Chatterjee, Rambha	Remake of Telugu film Chatrapathi
2007	I Love You	Ravi Kinagi	Dev, Payel Sarkar, Tapas Das	Remake of 2005 Telugu film Nuvvostanante Nenoddantana
2007	Minister Fatakeshto	Swapan Saha	Mithun Chakraborty, Locket Chatterjee, Koel Mallick, Shankar Chakraborty	
2008	Chirodini Tumi Je Amaar	Raj Chakraborty	Rahul Banerjee, Priyanka Sarkar	Remake of Tamil film Kaadhal
2008	Love	Riingo Banerjee	Jisshu Sengupta, Koel Mallick	Based on Erich Segal's English novel Love Story
2008	Premer Kahini	Ravi Kinagi	Dev, Koel Mallick, Ranjit Mallick	Remake of Kannada film Mungaru Male
2009	Prem Aamar	Raj Chakraborty	Soham Chakraborty, Payel Sarkar	Remake of Tamil film 7G Rainbow Colony
2009	Paran Jai Jaliya Re	Ravi Kinagi	Dev, Subhashree Ganguly	Based on Hindi film Namastey London
2009	Saat Paake Bandha	Sujit Mondal	Jeet, Koel Mallick	Remake of Telugu film Pavitra Bandham
2009	Challenge	Raj Chakraborty	Dev, Subhashree Ganguly	Remake of Telugu films Bunny and Dil
2009	Jackpot	Kaushik Ganguly	Hiran Chatterjee, Koel Mallick	
2010	Shedin Dekha Hoyechilo	Sujit Mondal	Dev, Srabanti Chatterjee, Tapas Paul	Remake of Telugu film Parugu
2010	Dui Prithibi	Raj Chakraborty	Dev, Jeet, Koel Mallick, Barkha Bisht Sengupta	Remake of Telugu film Gamyam
2010	Autograph	Srijit Mukherjee	Prosenjit Chatterjee, Nandana Sen, Indraneil Sengupta	
2010	Josh	Ravi Kinagi	Jeet, Srabanti Chatterjee	Remake of Telugu film Bhadra
2010	Amanush	Rajiv Kumar Biswas	Soham Chakraborty, Srabanti Chatterjee	Remake of Tamil film Kaadhal Kondein

== 2011–2015 ==
Year	Film	Director(s)	Cast	Note
2011	Royal Bengal Rohosso	Sandip Ray	Sabyasachi Chakraborty, Saheb Bhattacharya, Bibhu Bhattacharya, Dr. Basudeb Mukherjee, Bhaswar Chatterjee	
2011	Romeo	Sujit Mondal	Dev, Subhashree Ganguly	Remake of Telugu film Konchem Ishtam Konchem Kashtam
2011	Faande Poriya Boga Kaande Re	Soumik Chatterjee	Soham Chakraborty, Srabanti Chatterjee	Remake of Telugu film Maryada Ramanna
2011	Baishe Srabon	Srijit Mukherjee	Prosenjit Chatterjee, Parambrata Chatterjee, Abir Chatterjee, Raima Sen, Gautam Ghosh	Inspired from American film Righteous Kill
2011	Ami Shubhash Bolchi	Mahesh Manjrekar	Mithun Chakraborty, Saheb Bhattacharya, Laboni Sarkar, Barkha Bisht Sengupta, Anindya Chatterjee	Remake of Marathi film Me Shivajiraje Bhosale Boltoy
2011	Iti Mrinalini	Aparna Sen	Konkona Sen Sharma, Aparna Sen, Rajat Kapoor, Ananya Chatterjee, Srijit Mukherjee, Kaushik Sen	
2011	Memories in March	Sanjoy Nag	Deepti Naval, Rituparno Ghosh, Raima Sen	
2011	Cholo Paltai	Haranath Chakraborty	Prosenjit Chatterjee, Devdaan Bhowmik	Remake of Marathi film Shikshanachya Aaicha Gho
2012	Bojhena Shey Bojhena	Raj Chakraborty	Abir Chatterjee, Soham Chakraborty, Mimi Chakraborty, Payel Sarkar	Remake of 2011 Tamil film Engaeyum Eppothum
2012	Jekhane Bhooter Bhoy	Sandip Ray	Abir Chatterjee, Saswata Chatterjee, Paran Bandopadhyay	
2012	Bapi Bari Jaa	Abhijit Guha, Sudeshna Roy	Arjun Chakraborty, Mimi Chakraborty	
2012	Challenge 2	Raja Chanda	Dev, Puja Banerjee	Remake of Telugu film Dookudu
2012	Chitrangada	Rituparno Ghosh	Rituparno Ghosh, Jisshu Sengupta, Anjan Dutt, Raima Sen	
2012	Awara	Ravi Kinagi	Jeet, Sayantika Banerjee	Remake of 2008 Telugu film Krishna
2012	Hemlock society	Srijit Mukherjee	Parambrata Chatterjee, Koel Mallick, Roopa Ganguly	
2012	Jaaneman	Raja Chanda	Soham Chakraborty, Koel Mallick	Remake of Tamil film Paiya
2012	Le Halua Le	Raja Chanda	Mithun Chakraborty, Soham Chakraborty, Hiran Chatterjee, Payel Sarkar	Remake of Malayalam film Poochakkoru Mookkuthi
2012	100% Love	Ravi Kinagi	Jeet, Koel Mallick	Remake of Telugu film Aadavari Matalaku Arthale Verule
2013	Chander Pahar	Kamaleshwar Mukherjee	Dev, Gérard Rudolf	Based on Chander Pahar story written by Bibhutibhushan Bandyopadhyay
2013	Majnu	Rajiv Kumar Biswas	Hiran Chatterjee, Srabanti Chatterjee	Remake of Telugu film Nuvvu Naaku Nachav
2013	Mishawr Rawhoshyo	Srijit Mukherjee	Prosenjit Chatterjee, Indraneil Sengupta, Aryann Bhowmik	Based on story with same name written by Sunil Gangopadhyay
2013	Satyanweshi	Rituparno Ghosh	Sujoy Ghosh, Arpita Pal, Indraneil Sengupta	Based on Byomkesh Bakshi's story Chorabali
2013	Proloy	Raj Chakraborty	Parambrata Chatterjee, Mimi Chakraborty, Paran Bandopadhyay, Saswata Chatterjee	Based on true Incident of Barun Biswas
2013	Meghe Dhaka Tara	Kamaleshwar Mukherjee	Saswata Chatterjee, Abir Chatterjee, Ananya Chakraborty	Based on a story written by director Kamaleshwar Mukherjee
2013	Rocky	Sujit Mondal	Mahaakshay Chakraborty, Puja Banerjee, Mithun Chakraborty	Remake of Telugu film Oosaravelli
2013	Goynar Baksho	Aparna Sen	Saswata Chatterjee, Srabanti Chatterjee, Konkona Sen Sharma, Pijush Ganguly	Based on story written by Shirshendu Mukhopadhyay
2013	Loveria	Raja Chanda	Soham Chakraborty, Puja Banerjee	Remake of Telugu film Bumper Offer
2014	Badshahi Angti	Sandip Ray	Abir Chatterjee, Saurav Das, Paran Bandyopadhyay, Rajatava Dutta, Deepanker De, Biswajeet Chakraborty, Tathagata Mukherjee, Bharat Kaul	
2014	Khaad	Kaushik Ganguly	Kamaleshwar Mukherjee, Pallavi Chatterjee, Mimi Chakraborty, Rudranil Ghosh, Lily Chakraborty	
2014	Yoddha – The Warrior	Raj Chakraborty	Dev, Mimi Chakraborty	Remake of Telugu film Magadheera
2014	Borbaad	Raj Chakraborty	Bonny Sengupta, Rittika Sen	Remake of Tamil film Polladhavan
2014	Bindaas	Rajiv Kumar Biswas	Dev, Sayantika Banerjee, Srabanti Chatterjee	Remake of Telugu film Mirchi
2014	Golpo Holeo Shotti	Birsa Dasgupta	Soham Chakraborty, Mimi Chakraborty	Remake of Tamil film Pizza
2014	Chaar	Sandip Ray	Abir Chatterjee, Paran Bandopadhyay, Rajatava Dutt, Pijush Ganguly, Subhrajit Dutta, Sudipta Chakraborty, Sreelekha Mitra, Koel Mallick	Based on four stories written by different Writers.Bataswarer Abodon by Parasuram,Dui Bondhu and Kagtarua by Satyajit Ray,Porikksha by Sharadindu Bandyopadhyay
2014	Arundhati	Sujit Mondal	Indraneil Sengupta, Koel Mallick	Remake of Telugu film Arundhati
2014	Apur Panchali	Kaushik Ganguly	Parambrata Chatterjee, Parno Mittra, Gaurav Chakraborty	Based on the life of Subir Banerjee, the actor who played Apu in Pather Panchali (1955), the first film of Satyajit Ray's Apu trilogy
2014	Chirodini Tumi Je Amar 2	Soumik Chatterjee	Arjun Chakraborty, Urmila Mahanta	Remake of Tamil film Vazhakku Enn 18/9
2014	Obhishopto Nighty	Birsa Dasgupta	Paoli Dam, Indraneil Sengupta, June Malia, Laboni Sarkar	
2014	Bangali Babu English Mem	Ravi Kinagi	Soham Chakraborty, Mimi Chakraborty	Remake of Punjabi film Jatt & Juliet
2015	Arshinagar	Aparna Sen	Dev, Rittika Sen	A Musical based on Romeo and Juliet written by William Shakespeare
2015	Har Har Byomkesh	Arindam Sil	Abir Chatterjee, Ritwick Chakraborty, Sohini Sarkar, Nusrat Jahan, June Malia, Adil Hussain	Based on Banhi Patanga written by Sharadindu Bandyopadhyay
2015	Shudhu Tomari Jonyo	Birsa Dasgupta	Dev, Soham Chakraborty, Mimi Chakraborty, Srabanti Chatterjee	Remake of Tamil film Raja Rani
2015	Rajkahini	Srijit Mukherjee	Rituparna Sengupta, Abir Chatterjee, Jisshu Sengupta, Jaya Ahsan, Sayoni Ghosh, Sohini Sarkar, Jisshu Sengupta, Priyanka Sarkar, Rudranil Ghosh, Kanchan Mullick	
2015	Parbona Ami Chartey Tokey	Raj Chakraborty	Bonny Sengupta, Koushani Mukherjee	Remake of Telugu film Uyyala Jampala
2015	Besh Korechi Prem Korechi	Raja Chanda	Jeet, Koel Mallick	Remake of Telugu film Loukyam
2015	Roga Howar Sohoj Upaye	Debalay Bhattacharya	Parambrata Chatterjee, Riya Sen, Raima Sen	
2015	Jamai 420	Ravi Kinagi	Ankush Hazra, Soham Chakraborty, Hiran Chatterjee, Mimi Chakraborty, Nusrat Jahan, Payel Sarkar	The movie resembles Hindi movies like Housefull,Housefull 2 and Bengali movie Bye Bye Bangkok
2015	Nirbaak	Srijit Mukherjee	Anjan Dutt, Sushmita Sen, Jisshu Sengupta, Ritwick Chakraborty	
2015	Amanush 2	Rajiv Kumar Biswas	Soham Chakraborty, Payel Sarkar	Remake of Tamil film Naan
2015	Chotoder Chobi	Kaushik Ganguly	Dulal Sarkar, Debalina Roy	

== 2016–2020 ==
Year	Film	Director(s)	Cast	Note
2016	Haripada Bandwala	Pathikrit Basu	Ankush Hazra, Nusrat Jahan	Remake of Punjabi film Disco Singh
2016	Byomkesh Pawrbo	Arindam Sil	Abir Chatterjee, Sayantika Banerjee, Ritwick Chakraborty, Sohini Sarkar	Based on Sharadindu Bandyopadhyay's story Amriter Mrityu
2016	Gangster	Birsa Dasgupta	Yash Dasgupta, Mimi Chakraborty	
2016	Zulfiqar	Srijit Mukherjee	Dev, Prosenjit Chatterjee, Parambrata Chatterjee, Ankush Hazra, Jisshu Sengupta, Kaushik Sen, Rudranil Ghosh, Kanchan Mullick, Rahul Banerjee, Paoli Dam, Nusrat Jahan, June Malia, Kyra Dutt	Based on adaptation of two of William Shakespeare's tragedies: Julius Caesar and Antony and Cleopatra
2016	Love Express	Rajiv Kumar Biswas	Dev, Nusrat Jahan	Remake of Telugu film Venkatadri Express
2016	Eagoler Chokh	Arindam Sil	Saswata Chatterjee, Shubrajit Dutta, Gaurav Chakrabarty, Jaya Ahsan, Payel Sarkar, June Malia, Riya Banik, Anirban Bhattacharya	Based on a story of same name written by Shirshendu Mukhopadhyay
2016	Khawto	Kamaleshwar Mukherjee	Prosenjit Chatterjee, Paoli Dam, Raima Sen	
2016	Kelor Kirti	Raja Chanda	Dev, Ankush Hazra, Jisshu Sengupta, Rudranil Ghosh, Mimi Chakraborty, Nusrat Jahan, Koushani Mukherjee, Sayantika Banerjee	Remake of 2002 Tamil movie Charlie Chaplin and its Hindi remake movie No Entry
2016	Cinemawala	Kaushik Ganguly	Parambrata Chatterjee, Sohini Sarkar, Paran Bandopadhyay	
2016	Power	Rajiv Kumar Biswas	Jeet, Sayantika Banerjee, Nusrat Jahan	Remake of Telugu film Power
2016	Ki Kore Toke Bolbo	Ravi Kinagi	Ankush Hazra, Mimi Chakraborty	Remake of Kannada film Milana
2017	Amazon Obhijaan	Kamaleswar Mukherjee	Dev, Svetlana Gulokava, David James, Laboni Sarkar	
2017	Bolo Dugga Maiki	Raj Chakraborty	Ankush Hazra, Nusrat Jahan	Based on Malayalam movie Oru Vadakkan Selfie
2017	Yeti Obhijaan	Srijit Mukherjee	Prosenjit Chatterjee, Aryann Bhowmik	Based on novel Pahar Churaye Atonko by Sunil Gangopadhyay
2017	Rangbazz	Abdul Mannan & Shamim Ahamed Roni	Shakib Khan, Shabnom Bubly, Amit Hasan	Shakib Khan's first Bengali venture with SVF
2017	Shob Bhooturey	Birsa Dasgupta	Abir Chatterjee, Sohini Sarkar	
2017	Dhananjoy	Arindam Sil	Anirban Bhattacharya, Mimi Chakraborty	
2017	Ami Je Ke Tomar	Rabi Kinagi	Ankush, Nusrat Jahan, Sayantika	Remake of Marathi film Mitwaa
2017	One	Birsa Dasgupta	Yash Dasgupta, Nusrat Jahan, Prosenjit Chatterjee	Remake of Tamil movie Thani Oruvan
2017	Begum Jaan	Srijit Mukherjee	Vidya Balan, Illa Arun	Remake of Rajkahini
2017	Tomake Chai	Rajiv Kumar Biswas	Bonny Sengupta, Koushani Mukherjee	Remake of Kannada movie Sanju Weds Geetha
2018	Adventures Of Jojo	Raj Chakraborty	Joshojit Banerjee, Rudranil Ghosh	Based on a novel by Leela Majumdar.
2018	Generation Ami	Mainak Bhaumik	Rwitobroto Mukherjee, Sauraseni Maitra	A coming-of-age tale.
2018	Villain	Baba Yadav	Ankush Hazra, Mimi Chakraborty, Rittika Sen	Based on Telugu movie Gentleman
2018	Byomkesh Gotro	Arindam Sil	Abir Chatterjee, Sohini Sarkar, Rahul Banerjee, Arjun Chakrabarty, Anjan Dutt	Based on Rakter Daag by Sharadindu Bandopadhyay.
2018	Ek Je Chhilo Raja	Srijit Mukherji	Jisshu Sengupta, Anjan Dutt, Anirban Bhattacharya, Aparna Sen, Jaya Ahsan, Rudranil Ghosh, Rajnandini Paul, Barun Chanda	Inspired by the famous Bhawal Sanyasi Court Case.
2018	Naqaab	Rajiv Kumar Biswas	Shakib Khan, Nusrat Jahan, Sayantika Banerjee	Shakib Khan's second Bengali venture with SVF; Remake of 2015 Tamil film Massu Engira Masilamani
2018	Crisscross	Birsa Dasgupta	Nusrat Jahan, Mimi Chakraborty, Jaya Ahsan, Sohini Sarkar, Priyanka Sarkar, Arjun Chakrabarty, Gaurav Chakraborty, Ridhima Ghosh	Based on Smaranjit Chakraborty's best-seller Crisscross.
2018	Bidaay Byomkesh	Debaloy Bhattacharya	Abir Chatterjee, Sohini Sarkar, Joy Sengupta, Bidipta Chakrabarty, Rahul Banerjee, Sujoy Prosad Chatterjee, Arindam Sil	This film doesn't mark the end of Byomkesh saga as young Satyaki marks a new beginning.
2018	Fidaa	Pathikrit Basu	Yash Dasgupta, Sanjana Banerjee	Actress Sanjana Banerjee's debut film Remake of 2018 Telugu film Tholi Prema
2018	Uma	Srijit Mukherji	Jisshu Sengupta, Sara Sengupta, Anjan Dutt, Anirban Bhattacharya, Srabanti Chatterjee, Rudranil Ghosh, Babul Supriyo, Sayantika Banerjee, Gargi Roychowdhury	Sara Sengupta's (daughter of Jisshu and Neelanjana Sengupta) debut film
2018	Guptodhoner Sondhane	Dhrubo Banerjee	Abir Chatterjee, Arjun Chakrabarty, Ishaa M Saha	Dhrubo Banerjee's directorial debut
2018	Aami Ashbo Phirey	Anjan Dutt	Anjan Dutt, Swastika Mukherjee, Kaushik Sen, Darshana Banik, Sauraseni Maitra, Anindya Chatterjee, Anjana Basu	Aami Ashbo Phirey (directed by Anjan Dutt) is about songs healing lives.
2018	Raja Rani Raji	Rajiv Kumar Biswas	Bonny Sengupta, Rittika Sen	Remake of 2010 Tamil film Boss Engira Bhaskaran
2018	Noor Jahaan	Abhimanyu Mukherjee	Adrit Roy, Puja Cherry	Remake of 2016 Marathi film Sairat
2018	Total Dadagiri	Pathikrit Basu	Yash Dasgupta, Mimi Chakraborty	Remake of 2017 Telugu film Nenu Local
2018	Asche Abar Shabor	Arindam Sil	Saswata Chatterjee, Subhrajit Dutta, Gaurav Chakrabarty, Indraneil Sengupta, Lolita Chatterjee, Mir Afsar Ali, Diti Saha, Darshana Banik	Based on the story Prajapatir Mrityu O Punorjanmo written by Shirshendu Mukhopadhyay
2019	Professor Shonku O El Dorado	Sandip Ray	Dhritiman Chatterjee, Subhasish Mukherjee	Based on Prof Shanku's novel by Satyajit Ray.
2019	Ghawre Bairey Aaj	Aparna Sen	Jisshu Sengupta, Anirban Bhattacharya, Tuhina Das	Based on the self-titled novel by Rabindranath Tagore.
2019	Gumnaami	Srijit Mukherji	Prosenjit Chatterjee, Anirban Bhattacharya, Tanusree Chakraborty	Based on Conundrum by Anuj Dhar & Chandrachur Ghose
2019	Goyenda Junior	Mainak Bhaumik	Rwitobroto Mukherjee, Shantilal Mukherjee, Anusha Vishwanathan	
2019	Bornoporichoy	Mainak Bhaumik	Abir Chatterjee, Jisshu Sengupta, Priyanka Sarkar	
2019	Bibaho Obhijaan	Birsa Dasgupta	Ankush Hazra, Nusrat Faria, Rudranil Ghosh, Sohini Sarkar, Anirban Bhattacharya, Priyanka Sarkar	It is about an NRI couple who are forced to return to their roots for their child.
2019	Durgeshgorer Guptodhon	Dhrubo Banerjee	Abir Chatterjee, Arjun Chakrabarty, Ishaa M Saha	A sequel to Guptodhoner Sandhane and the second film in the Sona Da franchise
2019	Bhoot Chaturdashi	Shabbir Mallick	Aryann Bhowmik, Soumendra Bhattacharya, Ena Saha, Deepshita Mitra	Four friends set out to shoot a documentary. Unexpected horrible incidents abound.
2019	Ke Tumi Nandini	Pathikrit Basu	Bonny Sengupta, Rupsha Mukhopadhyay	Remake of 2014 Malayalam film Ohm Shanthi Oshaana
2019	Vinci Da	Srijit Mukherji	Rudranil Ghosh, Ritwick Chakraborty, Anirban Bhattacharya, Sohini Sarkar, Riddhi Sen	
2019	Mon Jaane Na	Shagufta Rafique	Yash Dasgupta, Mimi Chakraborty	A Real Concept
2019	Finally Bhalobasha	Anjan Dutt	Anjan Dutt, Raima Sen, Anirban Bhattacharya, Arjun Chakrabarty, Sauraseni Maitra, Arindam Sil, Suprobhat	Anjan Dutt's Finally Bhalobasha to have three love stories.
2019	Shahjahan Regency	Srijit Mukherji	Anjan Dutt, Rituparna Sengupta, Mamata Shankar, Rudranil Ghosh, Abir Chatterjee, Parambrata Chatterjee, Anirban Bhattacharya, Swastika Mukherjee, Rittika Sen	Based on a novel by Shankar – Chowringhee.
2020	Cheeni	Mainak Bhaumik	Aparajita Adhya, Madhumita Sarcar	
2020	Dracula Sir	Debaloy Bhattacharya	Anirban Bhattacharya, Mimi Chakraborty, Rudranil Ghosh, Supriyo Dutta, Bidipta Chakraborty, Kanchan Mullick	
2020	Detective	Joydip Mukherjee	Anirban Bhattacharya, Ishaa Saha, Saheb Bhattacharya, Trina Saha, Ambarish Bhattacharya	
2020	Love Aaj Kal Porshu	Pratim D. Gupta	Arjun Chakrabarty, Madhumita Sarkar, Paoli Dam, Anindita Bose, Anirban Chakraborti, Abhijit Guha	
2020	Dwitiyo Purush	Srijit Mukherji	Parambrata Chatterjee, Raima Sen, Abir Chatterjee, Anirban Bhattacharya, Rwitobroto Mukherjee, Gaurav Chakraborty	A sequel to Baishe Srabon and the second film

== 2021–present ==
Key
†	Denotes films that have not yet been released

Year	Film	Director(s)	Note
2021	Ekannoborti	Mainak Bhaumik	
2021	Golondaaj	Dhrubo Banerjee	Biopic of Nagendraprasad Sarbadhikari
2021	Mukhosh	Birsa Dasgupta	Remake of 2020 Malayalam film Anjaam Pathiraa
2021	Tangra Blues	Supriyo Sen	
2021	Prem Tame	Anindya Chatterjee	
2022	Khela Jawkhon	Arindam Sil	Joint venture
2022	Ballabhpurer Roopkotha	Anirban Bhattacharya	Adapted from Badal Sircar's play
2022	Karnasubarner Guptodhon	Dhrubo Banerjee	Sequel to the Sonada adeventure film series
2022	Byomkesh Hotyamancha	Arindam Sil	Another part of the Byomkesh film series directed by Arindam Sil
2022	Kuler Achaar	Sudeep Das	
2022	X=Prem	Srijit Mukherji	Inspired from the film Eternal Sunshine of the Spotless Mind
2022	The Eken	Joydip Mukherjee	First film of the Eken franchise
2022	Kakababur Protyaborton	Srijit Mukherji	Based on Sunil Gangopadhyay's Jongoler Modhye Ekti Hotel.
2023	Kabuliwala	Suman Ghosh	Adapted from Rabindranath Tagore's short story of the same name
2023	Bogla Mama Jug Jug Jiyo	Dhrubo Banerjee	Adapted from the literary character
2023	Dawshom Awbotaar	Srijit Mukherji	Prequel to the 2011 blockbuster Baishe Srabon
2023	Cheeni 2	Mainak Bhaumik	
2023	Abar Bibaho Obhijaan	Soumik Haldar	Sequel to the film Bibaho Obhijaan
2023	The Eken: Ruddhaswas Rajasthan	Joydip Mukherjee	Sequel to the Eken Babu film series
2023	Dilkhush	Rahool Mukherjee	
2024	Shontaan	Raj Chakraborty	
2024	Shri Swapankumarer Badami Hyenar Kobole	Debaloy Bhattacharya	Hoichoi Studios Films
2024	Toofan	Raihan Rafi	Bangladeshi film; Shakib Khan's third Bengali venture with SVF; Joint venture with Chorki and Alpha-i
2024	Athhoi	Arno Mukhopadhyay	An adaptation of the Shakespearean tragedy Othello
2025	Shotyi Bole Shotyi Kichhu Nei	Srijit Mukherji	An adaptation of Ek Ruka Hua Faisla
2025	Ei Raat Tomar Amaar	Parambrata Chattopadhyay	Hoichoi Studios Films
2025	Daagi	Shihab Shaheen	Bangladeshi film; Joint venture with Chorki and Alpha-i
2025	Killbill Society	Srijit Mukherji	
2025	The Eken: Benaras e Bibhishika	Joydip Mukherjee	Hoichoi Studios Films
2025	Taandob	Raihan Rafi	Bangladeshi film; Joint venture with Chorki and Alpha-i
2025	Pokkhirajer Dim	Soukarya Ghosal	
2025	Raghu Dakat	Dhrubo Banerjee	Joint venture with Dev Entertainment Ventures
2025	Lawho Gouranger Naam Rey	Srijit Mukherji	Joint venture with Dag Creative Media
2025	Domm: Until The Last Breath	Redoan Rony	Bangladeshi film; Joint venture with Chorki and Alpha-i
2026	Vijaynagar'er Hirey	Chandrasish Ray	Film based on Sunil Gangopadhyay's Kakababu adventure
2026	Bonolota Express	Tanim Noor	Based on Kichukkhon by Humayun Ahmed, Hoichoi Studios Films
2026	Jai Kanhaiyalall Ki	Dharmesh S. Mehta	Gujrati Language Film
2026	Singh vs Kaur 2	Navaniat Singh	Sequel to the film Singh vs Kaur, Punjabi Language Film
2026	Saptadingar Guptodhon	Dhrubo Banerjee	
2026	Katukutu Buro	Ujaan Ganguly	
2026	Beporoya	Abhirup Ghosh	Adrit Roy, Aryaa Roy
2026	The Eken: Kerala-e Kurukshetra	Joydeep Mukherjee	Hoichoi Studios Films
2026	Sadhak Bamakhyapa	Sayantan Ghosal	
2026	Surongo 2	Raihan Rafi	Bangladeshi film; joint venture with Alpha-i
2027	Bhugun	Debaloy Bhattyacharya	Hoichoi Studios Films
2027	Maharaja Tomare Selam	Srijit Mukherji	Based on the making of Goopy Gyne Bagha Byne, Hoichoi Studios Films
2027	Bhoyongkar Shundor	Chandrasish Ray	

== See also ==
- Cinema of West Bengal
- List of film production companies in India
- Surinder Films
