= Fourth period =

fourth period may refer to:

- Overtime (ice hockey), the 1st overtime period, or 4th period of a game
- Period 4 elements of the chemical periodic table
- Fourth period under communist dogma, see Third Period

== See also ==
- 4th Period Mystery
