= Borbaad =

Borbaad may refer to:

- Borbaad (Indian film), a 2014 Indian Bengali-language film by Raj Chakraborty starring Bonny Sengupta
- Borbaad (Bangladeshi film), a 2025 Bangladeshi film by Mehedi Hassan Hridoy starring Shakib Khan
- Borbaad, a song by Prince Mahmud from 2024 Bangladeshi film Rajkumar
