= Raja Rani Romeo =

- Genre: Romance & Thriller
- Story by: Joydip Banerjee, Partha Pratim Banerjee
- Directed by: Joydip Banerjee
- Starring: Joyjit Banerjee, Arpan Ghoshal, Swikriti Majumder, Jeet Sundor, Ratasree Dutta, Jit Das
- Country of origin: India
- Original language: Bengali
- No. of seasons: 1
- No. of episodes: 5

Production
- Cinematography: Anir
- Editor: Koustav Sarkar
- Production companies: Films and Frames

Original release
- Release: 29 December 2023

Raja Rani Romeo is a 2023 Indian Bengali language Romance Thriller web series written and directed by Joydip Banerjee.

The series starring Joyjit Banerjee, Arpan Ghoshal, Swikriti Majumder, Jeet Sundor, Ratasree Dutta, Jit Das are in the main cast.

Cinematography is done by Anir. Series was released on 29 December 2023.

== Cast ==
- Joyjit Banerjee as Bishnu Adhikary
- Arpan Ghoshal as Mithun Das
- Swikriti Majumder as Rani
- Jeet Sundor as Guddu
- Ratasree Dutta
- Jit Das as Debu
- Koushani Mukherjee

== Synopsis ==
A petty ex-con's ordinary existence is abruptly disrupted when he becomes infatuated with an unsuitable woman. He must navigate the intricate web of affection, deception, and treachery to uncover the truth.

== Episodes ==
No.	Title	Directed by	Original release date
1	"Jekhane Bagh Er Voy"	Joydip Banerjee	29 December 2023
Imran disregards reason and prudence to pursue his affection for Gayatri.
2	"Norok"	Joydip Banerjee	29 December 2023
Imran and Gayatri devise a great plot to elope, which ultimately fails catastrophically.
3	"Rakkhos Bodh"	Joydip Banerjee	29 December 2023
Bishnu's startling narrative reveals his sorrowful history and his ambitious plan for a more promising future.
4	"Idur"	Joydip Banerjee	29 December 2023
Imran is evading capture as the police probe intensifies.
5	"Two In One"	Joydip Banerjee	29 December 2023
Rani recounts her sorrowful narrative and presents an alternative solution.
6	"Kurukkhetro"	Joydip Banerjee	29 December 2023
Rani's strategy succeeds on this occasion. Jamal perishes, Bishnu is apprehended. Imran believes the difficult times have concluded, yet they persist.

== Soundtrack ==
The singers of the series are Alaap Bose, Kankana Trivedi, Pranjal Das, Shrestha D and Diptarka Bose.

No.	Title	Singer(s)	Length
1	Meghbalika	Alaap Bose	4:36
1	Parodeshi Megh	Kankana Trivedi	4:35
1	Shantir Chele	Pranjal Das	2:36
1	Submarine (Female)	Shrestha D	4:18
1	Submarine (Male)	Diptarka Bose	5:21
		Total Length	21:26
