= Abar Proloy =

- Genre: Crime thriller
- Written by: Raj Chakraborty
- Directed by: Raj Chakraborty
- Creative director: Sohini Dasgupta
- Starring: Saswata Chatterjee; Paran Bandopadhyay; Debasish Mondal; Ritwick Chakraborty; Gaurav Chakrabarty; Koushani Mukherjee; June Maliah; Sohini Sengupta
- Composer: Amit Chatterjee
- Country of origin: India
- Original language: Bengali
- No. of seasons: 2
- No. of episodes: 18 (list of episodes)

Production
- Executive producer: Mimeo Hhazra
- Producer: Subhashree Ganguly Raj Chakraborty
- Cinematography: Manas Ganguly
- Editor: Md. Kalam
- Production company: Raj Chakraborty Entertainment

Original release
- Network: ZEE5
- Release: August 11, 2023 (season 1)
- Release: February 27, 2026 (season 2)

Abar Proloy (transl. Doomsday Again) is a 2023 Bengali-language action thriller web series written and directed by Raj Chakraborty and produced by Raj Chakraborty Entertainment and Subhashree Ganguly. The show features an ensemble cast including Paran Bandopadhyay, Saswata Chatterjee, Ritwick Chakraborty, June Maliah, Koushani Mukherjee, Gaurav Chakrabarty, Sohini Sengupta. The series serves as a spin-off of the 2013 film Proloy. The first season was released on the ZEE5 OTT platform on 11 August 2023, followed by a second season released on 27 February 2026.

== Plot ==
=== Season 1 ===
The story of Abar Proloy is set in the Sundarban forest in West Bengal part. The story starts in 2004, revolving around a critical problem arising in the Sundarban where a group of teenage boys manipulate young girls and women by luring them into a trap of love. The gang subsequently traffics the women to other states, leading to a surge in women trafficking in Sundarban. In response to this issue, special crime branch officer Animesh Datta, portrayed by Saswata Chatterjee, takes on the responsibility of rescuing the trapped girls and putting an end to the violence.

=== Season 2 ===
The second season shifts the setting to the urban landscape of Kolkata. The narrative focuses on Animesh Datta investigating a series of high-profile gold heists executed by a criminal syndicate. The perpetrators leave a signature known as Netaji's Salute at the crime scenes, leading to an investigation into a wider conspiracy involving political corruption.

== Cast ==
- Saswata Chatterjee as Animesh Dutta, Officer of Special Crime Branch
- Paran Bandopadhyay as Binod Behari Dutta, a retired schoolteacher (Extended cameo)
- Ritwick Chakraborty as Shombhu Baba / Haru Bag
- Koushani Mukherjee as Mohini Maa / Moni
- Gaurav Chakrabarty as Kanu Kole
- Partha Bhowmick as Ashim Karali, OC of Sundarban
- Sohini Sengupta as Constable Madhabi Mahato, Constable of Sundarban
- Saayoni Ghosh as Shampa Mondal
- Nusrat Faria in a special appearance in the song "Menoka"
- June Maliah as Indrani Dutta, Animesh's wife
- Biswajit Chakraborty as Animesh's father-in-law
- Debasish Mondal as Bitan Bose, Animesh's assistant and junior officer, Bhavani Bhavan
- Kharaj Mukherjee as Ganesh Das, OC of Ranaghat
- Rohan Bhattacharya as Badal Maharana, OC of Ranigunj
- Sauraseni Maitra as Damayanti Ghosh, SI of Barrackpore
- Faiz Khan as Minister Nirjhar Singh
- Anoushka Pant as ADGP Geeta Bharadwaj
- Srikanto Manna as IG
- Debjani Singha as Sumana Singha Roy, DGP
- Om Sahani as Ravi Sardar
- Sumeet Thakur as Raju Chowdhury
- Srabanti Chatterjee in a special appearance
- Subhashree Ganguly as Subhashini Joardar, SP of Baruipur
- Debnath Chatterjee as Siddhartha Ghosh, Damayanti's brother
- Anirban Bhattacharya as Dayananda Khara, Jailor of Dumdum Central Jail
- Soham Chakraborty as Barun Dutta, Animesh's son
- Anujoy Chattopadhyay as Pullu Gupta
- Loknath Dey as Paritosh Sarkar
- Biswajit Sarkar as Abbas Khan, local doon of Malda
- Narayan Goswami as Ansari, ACP of Malda
- Samm Bhattacharya as Zishan Razi/Sagar (fake name)
- Alexandra Taylor as Britney
- Pushan Dasgupta as young Haru
- Debmalya Gupta as young Kanu
- Beas Dhar as young Moni
- Shahir Raj as Jack
- Arya Dasgupta as Rubel
- Samiul Alam as Pintu Mondal
- Shyamashis Pahari as inspector at Sundarban
- Amlan Mazumdar as inspector at Sundarban

== Episode list ==
=== Season 1 ===
No.	Title	Directed by	Written by	Original release date
1	"Kewda"	Raj Chakraborty	Raj Chakraborty	11 August 2023
The authorities accidentally rescue a group of minor girls from being trafficked. They send Animesh Dutta, a rogue special crime branch officer, to the Sundarbans to bust the women trafficking racket.
2	"Hujjati"	Raj Chakraborty	Raj Chakraborty	11 August 2023
In the Sundarbans, Animesh is currently rescuing a teenage girl named Dugga from being trafficked. He rushes her to the hospital for help. Meanwhile, the Hujja boys, following their boss's orders, are devising a plan to teach the new officer a lesson.
3	"Hello Baba"	Raj Chakraborty	Raj Chakraborty	11 August 2023
Animesh goes to the ashram led by the seer Shambhu Baba and his partner Mohini Ma, who is quite attractive. At the same time, Dutta is plotting an attack on the Hujja boys, and there's also a new girl who has disappeared.
4	"Ispecial Dutta in Danger"	Raj Chakraborty	Raj Chakraborty	11 August 2023
When they discover one of the Hujja boys hanging from a tree, the gang suspects Animesh of the murder. Meanwhile, a nurse at the hospital finds out that her brother, Pintu, is a Hujja member and is linked to human trafficking.
5	"Mar Gariyechhe"	Raj Chakraborty	Raj Chakraborty	11 August 2023
Animesh uncovers Kanu as the ruthless mastermind behind the operation. As the Hujja boys abduct Dugga from the hospital, an unknown individual beats them up and saves Dugga. Animesh is taken aback when he learns the true identity of the person who came to the rescue.
6	"Kan Tanle Kanu"	Raj Chakraborty	Raj Chakraborty	11 August 2023
Animesh discovers that Kanu has a history as a feared criminal. He has a conversation with the detective who apprehended Kanu. Within the Ashram's premises, Shampa admits to Baba that Pintu is associated with the Hujja. Tragically, Parul's lifeless body is discovered.
7	"Shire Sangkraanti"	Raj Chakraborty	Raj Chakraborty	11 August 2023
Binod Bihari accompanies Animesh to meet Malati, a survivor of trafficking who bears similar facial injuries as Parul. When asked about her own ordeal, Malati becomes emotional and utters the word 'hyena'. Meanwhile, a situation involving Swamprabha intensifies as it turns into a fire.
8	"Khela Hobe"	Raj Chakraborty	Raj Chakraborty	11 August 2023
Shampa and Pintu mysteriously disappear. Animesh organizes a search operation for Kanu, Pintu, and the rest of the Hujja group. While the police successfully apprehend one of the Hujja boys, Animesh comes across a crucial piece of information regarding Kanu.
9	"Pain Maraben Naa"	Raj Chakraborty	Raj Chakraborty	11 August 2023
Animesh and his team venture to the eerie meadow but discover no evidence. During the interrogation of Poritosh and Kanu, Kanu shifts the blame onto Poritosh, accusing him of betraying and murdering Ratan. In a surprising turn of events, Kanu escapes from custody.
10	"Dhor Betake, Mar Salake"	Raj Chakraborty	Raj Chakraborty	11 August 2023
Animesh leads his team to the haunted meadow and successfully locates both Shampa and Pintu. In a significant breakthrough, they manage to apprehend the culprit responsible for the events.

== Production ==
Abar Proloy was produced by Raj Chakraborty Entertainment and Subhashree Ganguly. The series was directed by Raj Chakraborty, known for his work in the Bengali film industry. Raj Chakraborty wrote the screenplay for the series. The music for was composed by Amit Chatterjee.

Following the commercial success of the first season, the makers announced a second season in January 2026. Director Raj Chakraborty moved the production from the rural Sundarbans to Kolkata to explore an urban crime thriller format. In February 2026, a 50-foot promotional poster was unveiled in Garia, Kolkata, to mark the release of the second season.

== Release and reception ==
The teaser for Abar Proloy was released on 1 July 2023, receiving a mixed response from the audience. The teaser introduced rowdy cop Animesh Dutta, played by Saswata Chatterjee. However, some viewers noted alleged similarities between one of the characters in the series and the character Guruji (enacted by Pankaj Tripathi) from the Hindi web series Sacred Games, which drew negative remarks. Abar Proloy was released on the ZEE5 OTT platform on 11 August 2023.

== Track listing ==
No.	Title	Length
1.	"Menoka"
2.	"Keora"
