= Parbona Ami Chartey Tokey =

2015 Indian Bengali film by Raj Chakraborty

- Theatrical release poster
- Directed by: Raj Chakraborty
- Written by: N.K. Salil
- Produced by: Srikant Mohta; Mahendra Soni
- Starring: Bonny Sengupta; Koushani Mukherjee
- Cinematography: Supriyo Dutta
- Edited by: Aninda Chatterjee
- Music by: Indradeep Dasgupta
- Production companies: Shree Venkatesh Films; Surinder Films
- Distributed by: Surinder Films
- Release date: 11 September 2015
- Country: India
- Language: Bengali
- Budget: ₹70 lakh
- Box office: ₹3 Crore

Parbona Ami Chartey Tokey (transl. I Cannot Leave You) is a 2015 Bengali romantic comedy film directed by Raj Chakraborty and produced by Shree Venkatesh Films and Surinder Films. This film is a remake of the 2013 Telugu film Uyyala Jampala. The film illustrates love story and family drama – with Bonny Sengupta and debuntant Koushani Mukherjee playing the lead characters.

== Synopsis ==
The whole film is narrated by Shibu who is running back to confess his love to Apu. Shibu and Apu quarrel since their childhood which starts from the time of the latter's birth. Apu is the daughter of the friend of Bonny's father. Apu's family and his parents live in a mansion while Shibu and his widowed mother live in a small house exactly beside the mansion in a modernized yet naturally scenic village.

== Cast ==
- Bonny Sengupta as Shibnath a.k.a. Shibu
- Koushani Mukherjee as Aparna Roy a.k.a. Apu (Voice Dubbed by Saayoni Ghosh)
- Swastika Dutta as Apu's friend
- Kharaj Mukherjee as Apu's father
- Mainak Banerjee as Apu's fake boyfriend
- Tulika Basu as Shibu's mother
- Debomoy Mukherjee as Shibu's friend
- Moushumi Saha as Apu's mother
- Pinky Mallik as Apu's housemaid
- Chhanda Karanjee as Apu's grandmother
- Sourav Chatterjee as Apu's fiancé

== Production ==
=== Development ===
Raj Chakraborty mentioned in an interview that he prefers naming his upcoming movies, based on the title of the most popular song from his previous directorial. "Parbona Ami Chartey Tokey" was the title of the most popular track from his previous film Borbaad; from there, he decided the title of this film.

In an interview with Hindustan Times, Raj Chakraborty said Bonny was less matured as an actor when he cast him in Borbaad. He wanted to project him as an action hero, but it didn't meet their expectations and ended up Bonny receiving a lot of negativity although the film broke even at the box office. After Bonny worked with him as an assistant director in Yodhha, he decided to cast him in another film and portray him as a next-door lover boy instead of a larger-than-life action hero.

=== Pre production ===
As per Raj's suggestions, Bonny took acting classes and dancing classes in the one year gap after Borbaad. He also visited the gym to get a more matured appearance in the film. Baba Yadav was hired as the choreographer for the dance sequences. Indradip Dasgupta was hired to compose only the title track for the film. But he surprised the director by creating all the songs of the film, which were eventually finalised owing to their catchy tunes.

For the female lead of the film, when Koushani was called for an audition, she had never acted before and was continuously speaking English. Raj gave her a script in Bengali and asked to come after a few days. When she turned up, she knew the script by heart and Raj liked her approach towards work. Later, Raj did a workshop with her for about a month and then decided to cast her. After grooming her and teaching her how to face a camera, he did an photoshoot with her, which Raj didn't let her know was the look test for the film. During it, he asked her to click selfies and from those selfies, he made the first poster of the film.

=== Casting ===
Parbona Ami Chartey Tokey marked the second collaboration between Bonny Sengupta and Raj Chakraborty after Borbaad in 2014. It also marked the debut of Koushani Mukherjee. She had earlier auditioned for a film under the same production house but she got rejected. When the director thought of introducing a new face in the movie, he asked the production house for any possible suggestions and they told about Koushani. After grooming her and teaching her how to face camera, he decided to cast her.

=== Filming ===
Most of the filming has been done in Raj Chakraborty's childhood and paternal village Majhdia in Nadia, West Bengal. The song "Ure Geche" has been filmed in Mauritius and the other songs including "O Lolona" has been filmed at Majhdia in West Bengal.

== Soundtrack ==
The music of the film has been composed by Indradeep Dasgupta. The lyrics have been penned by Prasen.

No.	Title	Singer(s)	Length
1.	"O Lolona"	Benny Dayal, Satrujit Dasgupta	3:33
2.	"Parbona Ami Chartey Tokey (Title Track)"	Arijit Singh	4:46
3.	"Ure Geche"	Ash King, Monali Thakur	4:26
4.	"Tumi Aashe Paashe"	Nakash Aziz, Monali Thakur	4:28
Total length:			17:13

== Release ==
The film was initially slated to release on 15 August 2015. Since the director's previous release Besh Korechi Prem Korechi was still going at the box office and was from the same production house, the release of Parbona Ami Chartey Tokey was delayed and it was released in the theatres on 10 September 2015.

== Reception ==
=== Critical reception ===
Upam Buzarbaruah of The Times of India rated the film 3/5 stars and wrote "Parbona Ambi Chartey Toke is a masala romcom that’s pretty watchable. You lose nothing if you give it a miss, but watching it isn’t a bad bet either. It is a clichéd tale of love — thankfully without a bad guy or blood and gore." He praised the performance of the whole cast, chemistry between the lead pair, the music and dance sequences but bemoaned the hair styling of the lead which didn't suit a rural background.
