= Jio Pagla =

2017 Indian Bengali film by Ravi Kinagi

- জিও পাগলা
- Directed by: Ravi Kinagi
- Written by: N. K. Salil
- Based on: Sailesh Dey's Bengali play Joymakali Boarding
- Produced by: Nispal Singh
- Starring: Jisshu Sengupta; Soham Chakraborty; Hiran Chatterjee; Bonny Sengupta; Srabanti Chatterjee; Payel Sarkar; Rittika Sen; Koushani Mukherjee
- Cinematography: Iswar Chandra Barik
- Music by: Jeet Gannguli
- Production company: Surinder Films
- Distributed by: Surinder Films
- Release date: 17 October 2017 (Kolkata)
- Running time: 2 hours 34 minutes
- Country: India
- Language: Bengali
- Box office: ₹10 crore

Jio Pagla (Bengali: জিও পাগলা Jiō Pāglā) is a 2017 Indian Bengali comedy film directed by Ravi Kinagi. The film is an adaptation of Sailesh Dey's Bengali play Joymakali Boarding.

== Plot ==
Ananta, Sujoy, Ananda and Rajasankar Dhol were very close friends from childhood. Ananta, a fashion photographer lives in a rented house, which is owned by Khagen Mal. He has sex every night with Khagen's wife Tola. His three friends live at their native place. Ananda has to come to Kolkata and lives with Ananta for his job at Kolkata. After that, Sujoy came to Kolkata for an interview for the Dance Paglu Dance and Rajasankar came to Kolkata having been chased from his work in theaters. In a dramatic turn of events, all the friends are forced to live together at Ananta's rented home. One day Khagen catches them red-handed doing mischief with his second wife, Tola Boudi and forces them to vacate the house. After a lot of searching they find a house where they could at least live but they need a family. So they decide that Sujoy and Dhol have to pretend to be Ananda's and Ananta's wife. Gradually everyone get their girlfriends, found their girlfriends having relation to the members of the same house and by some turn of events they all got to know everything. But Nepal Khan, the leader of Complex, associating with Khagen Mal, kidnapped them and threatened the family members to sign, for that he could complete his building project. The team of four friends reach there and fight with them and while fighting all makeups were removed and the family members also got to know about it. After all of the winning, they apologized to them and the family happily forgave them and appreciated them.

== Cast ==
- Jisshu Sengupta as Ananta Sen
- Soham Chakraborty as Rajasankar Dhol aka Gouri
- Hiran Chatterjee as Ananda
- Bonny Sengupta as Sujoy aka Sumona
- Srabanti Chatterjee as Priya
- Payel Sarkar as Nandita aka Nodi
- Rittika Sen as Sashikala
- Koushani Mukherjee as Monalisa
- Supriyo Dutta as Khagen Mal, owner of the house
- Payel Chakraborty as Tola Boudi, Khagen Mal's second wife
- Ambarish Bhattacharya as corrupt promoter Nepal Khan
- Anuradha Roy as Nayantara Devi
- Biswajit Chakraborty as Landlord
- Candy Das as Leela
- Kanchan Mallick as Nagen Nag, Sashikala's uncle
- Sharmila Das as Sashikala's Aunt
- Barna Raha
- Rimjhim Mitra as Judge
- Ravi Kinagi as Judge
- Kharaj Mukherjee as Inspector
- Masud Rana as Judge

== Soundtrack ==
Jio Pagla

Soundtrack album by Jeet Gannguli
- Released: 2017
- Recorded: 2017
- Studio: Surinder Films
- Genre: Feature film soundtrack
- Label: Surinder Films

Singles from Jio Pagla
- 1. "Jio Pagla Title Track" Released: 20 October 2017; 2. "Hawai Hawai" Released: 20 October 2017; 3. "Gorobini Maa" Released: 20 October 2017

All lyrics are written by Prasenjit Mallick, Priyo Chatterjee; all music is composed by Jeet Gannguli

No.	Title	Lyrics	Singer	Length
1.	"Jio Pagla Title Track"	Prasenjit Mallick	Benny Dayal, Monali Thakur	3:57
2.	"Hawai Hawai"	Prasenjit Mallick	Dev Negi, Monali Thakur	3:27
3.	"Gorobini Maa"	Priyo Chatterjee	Payal Dev	3:32
