= Tumi Ashbe Bole =

2021 Indian Bengali romance film

Tumi Asbe Bole
- Tumi Ashbe Bole Movie Poster
- Directed by: Sujit Mondal
- Screenplay by: Anshuman Pratyush; Prameet
- Produced by: Nispal Singh
- Starring: Bonny Sengupta; Koushani Mukherjee; Kaushik Banerjee
- Cinematography: Iswar Barik
- Edited by: Rabiranjan Mitra
- Music by: Jeet Ganguly
- Production company: Surinder Films
- Distributed by: Surinder Films
- Release date: 22 January 2021
- Country: India
- Language: Bengali

Tumi Ashbe Bole (transl. As You Will Come) is a 2021 Bengali romantic film directed by Sujit Mondal. The film is produced by Nispal Singh under the banner of Surinder Films, and stars Bonny Sengupta, and Koushani Mukherjee in lead roles. The film was released on 22 January 2021.

== Cast ==
- Bonny Sengupta as Raja/Nandagopal Goswami
- Koushani Mukherjee as Ankhi
- Kaushik Banerjee
- Palash Ganguly as Rocky
- Buddhadeb Bhattacharjee

== Soundtrack ==
Tumi Ashbe Bole

Soundtrack album by Jeet Ganguly
- Released: 21 December 2020
- Recorded: 2020
- Studios: Vibraphone Entertainment, Mumbai
- Genre: Feature film soundtrack
- Length: 10:12
- Language: Bengali
- Label: Surinder Films

The soundtrack of the film is composed by Jeet Ganguly and lyrics by Priyo Chattopadhyay

Track listing
No.	Title	Lyrics	Singer(s)	Length
1.	"Ki Kore Bhule Thakbo Toke"	Priyo Chattopadhyay	Jubin Nautiyal	3:01
2.	"Kobe Dakha Pabo Tor"	Priyo Chattopadhyay	Shovan Ganguly	3:34
3.	"Sab Range Tui"	Priyo Chattopadhyay	Rupam Islam	3:37
Total length:				10:12
