= Network (2019 film) =

2019 Indian Bengali-language film

- Theatrical release poster
- Directed by: Saptaswa Basu
- Screenplay by: Rini Ghosh; Saptaswa Basu
- Produced by: Priti Basu; Saptaswa Basu
- Starring: Saswata Chatterjee; Sabyasachi Chakraborty; Rini Ghosh; Bhaskar Banerjee; Indrajit Mazumder; Saptarshi Roy; Saayoni Ghosh; Anindya Chatterjee; Darshana Banik; Rana Basu Thakur
- Cinematography: Prosenjit Chowdhury (DOP); Ankit Sengupta (additional cinematography)
- Edited by: Anirban Maity; Saptaswa Basu (co-editor)
- Music by: Dabbu; Raz Dee; Chirantan Banerjee; Aviraj Sen
- Production company: Neo Studios
- Release date: 28 June 2019
- Country: India
- Language: Bengali
- Budget: ₹15 million (US$160,000)

Network is an Indian Bengali language thriller film, starring Saswata Chatterjee, Sabyasachi Chakraborty, Rini Ghosh, Bhaskar Banerjee, Indrajit Mazumder, Saptarshi Roy, Kartikey Tripathi, Eshani Ghosh, Saayoni Ghosh, Anindya Chatterjee, and Darshana Banik. The film is the debut feature of director Saptaswa Basu who has co-written the screenplay with Rini Ghosh. This is the first Bengali feature film to feature a song of the RnB genre which is composed and sung by Raz Dee. The promotional track of this film is sung by Shaan and composed by Dabbu. The other songs are composed by Chirantan Banerjee and Aviraj Sen.

The film was theatrically released on 28 June 2019.

== Plot ==
Abhijit Ganguly [Saswata Chatterjee] is a film director who has long lost his fame. After his daughter's death he has turned into a walking shadow, who is recognized by no one. When he gets to know about his terminal disease, which will allow him to live only for one more year, he decides to put in all his resources to make a new film and make a comeback to regain his lost fame. He is helped by his lawyer friend Subrata (Bhaskar Bannerjee), and teams up with a group of talented actors and a production management team including Raj and Shreya, who become very trusted to him. However, he is betrayed by these very associates and is left ruined. His arch rival Arindam (Sabyasachi Chakraborty) induces Raj n Shreya to sell the script and offers them the role of hero and heroine. Broken, Abhijit has no way out, so with his last ditch effort he creates a reality TV show named "Their Life", a unique show which deals with celebrity lifestyle. Through this show, he starts exploring and exposing Raj, Sreya and Arindam to take revenge on the persons who betrayed him one by one.

== Cast ==
- Saswata Chatterjee as Abhijit Ganguly
- Sabyasachi Chakraborty as Arindam Chakraborty
- Rini Ghosh as Shreya
- Indrajit Mazumder as Raj
- Kartikey Tripathi as Subho
- Bhaskar Banerjee as Subrata
- Eshani Ghosh as Puja
- Saayoni Ghosh as Priyanka (special appearance)
- Saptarshi Roy as Arjun Chatterjee
- Akshay Kapoor as Mr. Agarwal
- Anindya Chatterjee as Joy (special appearance)
- Darshana Banik as Prerna (special appearance)
- Rana Basu Thakur as Mr. Bose

== Filming ==
The film commenced its principal photography in mid 2017 and was wrapped up in early 2018. It was completed in three schedules including a song schedule, with intervals in between, to give time for rough edits and re-shoot decisions. A separate schedule was planned to shoot the climax sequence. The film has been shot in Kolkata, Bakrahat, Tajpur sea beach, Purple Movie town, Moon city studios and Raichak on Ganges. A few stock shots for the TV show sequence were shot in Andaman, Goa and Bangkok.

== Soundtrack ==
Network

Soundtrack album by Dabbu, Raz Dee, Chirantan Banerjee and Aviraj Sen
- Released: 2019
- Recorded: 2018
- Studio: Amara Muzik Bengali
- Genre: Feature film soundtrack
- Label: Amara Muzik Bengali

Singles from Network
- 1. "Tokey Chhara (তোকে ছাড়া)" Released: 1 Oct 2018; 2. "Deewana Bole Dake Amay" Released: 13 Feb 2019

All music is composed by Dabbu, Raz Dee, Chirantan Banerjee and Aviraj Sen.

| No. | Title | Lyrics | Music | Singer | Length |
|---|---|---|---|---|---|
| 1. | "Tokey Chhara" | Abhishek Bagchi, Raz Dee | Raz Dee | Raz Dee | 3:04 |
| 2. | "Deewana Bole Dake Amay" | Satrujit Dasgupta | Dabbu | Shaan, Jayeeta Roy | 4:22 |
