= Rajiv Kumar Biswas =

Indian film director

- Occupation: Film director
- Years active: 1993-2021
- Spouse: Srabanti Chatterjee (m. 2003; div. 2016)
- Children: 1

Rajiv Kumar Biswas also known as Rajib Biswas or Rajiv Kumar is an Indian film director who works in Bengali films.

== Filmography ==
=== Director ===
Denotes films that have not yet been released

Year	Films	Cast	Production	Notes
2009	Dujone	Dev, Srabanti Chatterjee	Eskay Movies	Remake of Telugu film Nuvvu Nenu
2010	Amanush	Soham Chakraborty, Srabanti Chatterjee	Shree Venkatesh Films	Remake of Tamil film Kaadhal Kondein
2011	Paglu	Dev, Koel Mallick	Surinder Films	Remake of Telugu film Devadasu
2012	Bikram Singha: The Lion Is Back	Prosenjit Chatterjee, Richa Gangopadhyay and Anusmriti Sarkar	Eskay Movies	Remake of Telugu film Vikramarkudu
2012	Idiot	Ankush Hazra, Srabanti Chatterjee	Eskay Movies	Remake of Tamil film Thiruvilaiyaadal Aarambam
2013	Khoka 420	Dev, Subhashree Ganguly, Nusrat Jahan	Eskay Movies	Remake of Telugu film Brindavanam
2013	Majnu	Hiran, Srabanti Chatterjee	Shree Venkatesh Films & Surinder Films	Remake of Telugu film Nuvvu Naaku Nachav
2014	Bindaas	Dev, Srabanti Chatterjee, Sayantika Banerjee	Shree Venkatesh Films & Jalsha Movies Production	Remake of Telugu film Mirchi
2015	Amanush 2	Soham Chakraborty, Payel Sarkar	Shree Venkatesh Films	Remake of Tamil Film Naan
2016	Power	Jeet, Sayantika Banerjee, Nusrat Jahan	Shree Venkatesh Films & Surinder Films	Remake of Telugu film of the same name
2016	Love Express	Dev, Nusrat Jahan	Shree Venkatesh Films & Surinder Films	Remake of Telugu film Venkatadri Express
2017	Tomake Chai	Bonny Sengupta, Koushani Mukherjee	Shree Venkatesh Films & Surinder Films	Remake of Kannada film Sanju Weds Geetha
2018	Raja Rani Raji	Bonny Sengupta, Rittika Sen	SVF Entertainment	Remake of Tamil film Boss Engira Bhaskaran
2018	Naqaab	Shakib Khan, Nusrat Jahan, Sayantika Banerjee	SVF Entertainment & Jaaz Multimedia	Remake of Tamil film Massu Engira Masilamani'
2018	Classroom	Sohail Dutta, Kuyasha Biswas, Kharaj Mukherjee	Joy Ram Cine Media	Remake of Korean film 4th Period Mystery; Distributed by Dev Entertainment Ventures'
2020	Love Story	Bonny Sengupta, Rittika Sen	Surinder Films	Remake of Tamil film Amara Kaaviyam
2021	Pratighat	Soham Chakraborty, Meghna Haldar, Priyanka Sarkar, Sabyasachi Chakrabarty	Surinder Films	
2022	Made in Chittagong	Partha Barua (as Solaiman), Aparna Ghosh (as Noorjahan), Sazu Khadem, Nasir Uddin Khan, Ifrad Abed, Hasan Azad, Chitralekha Guho		Co-directed by Imraul Rafat
