= Bonny Sengupta =

Indian Bengali actor

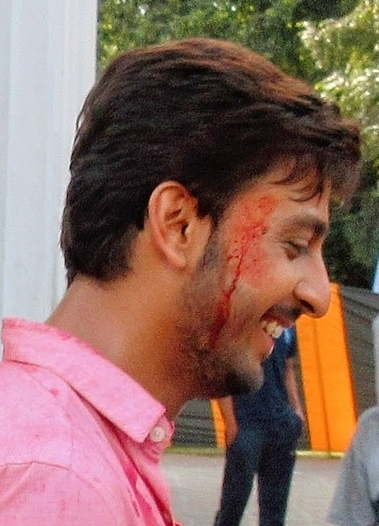
- Bonny Sengupta during a shoot
- Born: Anupriyo Sengupta; 10 August 1990 (age 36); Calcutta, West Bengal, India
- Occupations: Actor; Politician
- Years active: 2014–present
- Political party: Bharatiya Janata Party (2021–2022)
- Partner: Koushani Mukherjee
- Parent(s): Anup Sengupta; Piya Sengupta
- Relatives: Indraneil Sengupta (uncle); Barkha Bisht (Aunt); Sukhen Das (Grandfather)

Bonny Sengupta (born Anupriyo Sengupta on 10 August 1990) is an Indian film actor who considers who predominantly works in the Bengali film industry. He made his debut in 2014 with Borbaad directed by Raj Chakraborty. It was followed by another Raj Chakraborty directorial Parbona Ami Chartey Tokey in 2015, which earned him recognition and critical acclaim.

== Personal life ==
Bonny Sengupta was born in a family of film artists, to father Anup Sengupta and mother Piya Sengupta. He is the grandson of stage-actor and director Sukhen Das. He is the nephew of Indraneil Sengupta.

Sengupta joined the Bharatiya Janata Party in 2021, before the 2021 West Bengal Legislative Assembly election. He quit the party in 2022 citing "The party has failed to keep their commitments as promised for the state of West Bengal or for Bengali film industry."

== Career ==
Sengupta worked as an assistant director with Raj Chakraborty for Yoddha: The Warrior, before his career as an actor. He made his silver screen debut in 2014 with Borbaad directed by Raj Chakraborty. It was followed by Parbona Ami Chartey Tokey in 2015, which was also directed by Raj Chakraborty.

He has collaborated multiple times with Koushani Mukherjee for the portrayal of the lead actress in many of his films. In 2019, he acted in the Haranath Chakraborty directorial Bhootchakra Pvt. Ltd.. In 2017, he starred in Jio Pagla directed by Ravi Kinagi and Tomake Chai directed by Rajiv Kumar Biswas. After starring in a series of romantic comedy films, in 2021 he starred in FIR No. 339/07/06 along with Ankush Hazra. He has collaborated multiple times with the directors Raja Chanda, Saptaswa Basu and Rajiv Kumar Biswas.

Since 2022, he has starred in multiple critically acclaimed films including Antarjaal (2022), Jotugriho (2022), Ahalya (2024) and Robins Kitchen (2024). He repaired with Koushani Mukherjee in Subho Bijoya (2022) the romantic comedies Sob Koro Prem Koro Na (2023) and Hangama.com (2025). In 2025, he made his debut in the Odia film industry with Ajira Rebati.

== Filmography ==
†	Denotes films that have not yet been released

Year	Films	Role	Director	Notes	Ref.
2014	Borbaad	Joy	Raj Chakraborty	Marked his feature film debut; Remake of Polladhavan	
2015	Parbona Ami Chartey Tokey	Shibu	Raj Chakraborty	Remake of Uyyala Jampala	
2017	Tomake Chai	Joy	Rajiv Kumar Biswas	Remake of Sanju Weds Geetha	
2017	Jio Pagla	Sujoy aka Sumona	Rabi Kinagi	Adapted from the play Joy Maa Kali Boarding by Sailesh Dey	
2018	Raja Rani Raji	Raja	Rajiv Kumar Biswas	Remake of Boss Engira Bhaskaran	
2018	Girlfriend	Uttam	Raja Chanda	Remake of Cinema Choopistha Mava	
2018	Mone Rekho	Lucky Ali	Wajed Ali Sumon	Bangladeshi film	
2019	Ke Tumi Nandini	Abir	Pathikrit Basu	Remake of Ohm Shanthi Oshaana	
2019	Bhootchakra Pvt. Ltd.	Bonny Roy	Haranath Chakraborty	Loosely inspired by Anando Brahma	
2019	Jaanbaaz	Bikram	Anup Sengupta		
2020	Love Story	Anik	Rajiv Kumar Biswas	Remake of Amara Kaaviyam	
2020	Biye.Com	Ayan Das	Sudeshna Roy & Abhijit Guha	Based on Subhasis Das's short story "Do Something Cupid"; Zee5 Release	
2021	Tumi Ashbe Bole	Nanda	Sujit Mondal		
2021	Ajob Premer Golpo	Dipto	Raja Chanda	Zee5 Release	
2021	FIR No. 339/07/06	SI Naren Basak	Joydeep Mukherjee		
2022	Antarjaal		Prarjun Majumder		
2022	Hirokgorer Hire		Sayantan Ghosal	Zee5 Release	
2022	Jotugriho		Saptaswa Basu		
2022	Amrapali		Raja Chanda	Zee5 Release	
2022	Subho Bijoya	Aditya	Rohan Sen		
2023	Doctor Bakshi	Aditya	Saptaswa Basu		
2023	Daal Baati Churma Chochhori	Anand Singh Chauhan	Haranath Chakraborty	Also Producer	
2023	Archier Gallery	Archie	Promita Bhattacharya		
2023	Pakdondi		Rohan Sen		
2023	Sob Koro Prem Koro Na	Ronny	Debraj Sinha		
2024	Ahalya	TBA	Abhimanyu Mukherjee		
2024	Aayurekha	TBA	Rajdeep Ghosh		
2024	Robins Kitchen	Robin	Bappa		
2025	Hangama.com	Abhimanyu	Dr. Krishnendu Chatterjee		
2025	Ajira Rebati	Subodh	Subhransu	Marked his Odia feature film debut	
2025	Jhor	Michael	Antony Jane		
2026	Bhanupriya Bhooter Hotel	Aranyadeb	Aritra Mukherjee		
2026	Bansara †	TBA	Atiul Islam		
TBA	Lungiman †	Mr. Daptari	Asim Aktar		

== Controversy ==
In an interview in 2023, he described himself as the "Leading Most Hero" of the Bengali film industry. He was widely criticized and trolled on the social media for his comment.
