= Bolo Na Tumi Aamar =

2010 Indian Bengali film

- Theatrical release poster
- Directed by: Sujit Mondal
- Screenplay by: N.K. Salil
- Story by: Radha Mohan
- Produced by: Nispal Singh
- Starring: Dev; Koel Mallick; Sabyasachi Chakraborty; Tota Ray Chowdhury; Mousumi Saha; Bharat Kaul
- Cinematography: Kumud Verma
- Edited by: Rabi Ranjan Maitra
- Music by: Jeet Gannguli
- Production company: Surinder Films
- Distributed by: Surinder Films
- Release date: 15 January 2010
- Running time: 164 Minutes
- Country: India
- Language: Bengali

Bolo Na Tumi Aamar (English: Tell me You're mine) is a 2010 Indian Bengali-language romantic comedy film directed by Sujit Mondal. Produced by Nispal Singh under the banner of Surinder Films, it stars Dev and Koel Mallick in lead roles with Sabyasachi Chakraborty, Mousumi Saha, Tota Roy Chowdhury and Bharat Kaul in supporting roles. It had its soundtrack composed by Jeet Gannguli.

== Plot ==
Abhishek meets Madhurima, a medical student in North Bengal. After they return to Kolkata, they keep bumping into each other. Abhishek works as a pizza delivery boy. Madhurima’s marriage is fixed with Soumyadeep Sen, a cop, as her father saw her with Abishek on her scooter. Since it was Abhishek's fault, he wants to help Madhurima, so he tells Soumyadeep that he loves Madhurima. Soumyadeep, being a very "nice guy", calls off the marriage. Meanwhile, Madhurima's father fixes her marriage with another man, so Soumyadeep whisks them away and gets them married. They stay in a huge flat belonging to Soumyadeep. A line is drawn in the house so they don’t cross the line, as they stay separately. After a few days, Madhurima requires 2 lakhs (50,000 at first) immediately as fees begin to appear for her exams. They slowly become friends and indulge in their relations more. After Madhurima had her exam, she saw that she failed in one subject. Thinking that it was Abhishek's fault, she insults him on his birthday and asks for divorce and to leave the flat. Abhishek then doubles up as a stuntman, signs a contract and quietly goes and pays the money without informing Madhurima, as he was falling in love with her. When the results come out, Madhurima becomes the all India topper. She longs to meet Abhishek whom she had asked to leave the house and discovers that he is in the hospital, as he had injured himself while performing a dangerous stunt. On her way to meet him, Madhurima is taken into custody on false charges by a cop, Inspector Rudra, who wanted to get revenge on her father, a retired cop. Abhishek lands there after getting a call from Madhurima, who had managed to call him from another person’s phone. He starts beating the cops, but gets beaten black and blue himself. He manages to get up and start beating the cops again, nearly killing Rudra. Soumyadeep appears there and stops him, then asks Madhurima’s father to accept them; he does so readily.

== Cast ==
- Dev as Abhishek Dutta, a Pizza delivery boy
- Koel Mallick as Madhurima Chatterjee, an MBBS student
- Sabyasachi Chakraborty as retired DIG Indrajit Chatterjee, Madhurima's father
- Tota Roy Chowdhury as Soumyadeep Sen (A sincere Police Inspector, who was supposed to marry Madhurima)
- Gopal Talukdar as Somu, Abhi's best friend
- Mantu Mallick as Abhi's friend
- Subhankar Saha as Abhi's friend
- Mousumi Saha as Sarbani Chatterjee, Madhurima's mother
- Supriyo Dutta as Gunodhar, Pizza Hotel owner
- Bharat Kaul as a corrupt DIG, Rudra
- Sumit Ganguly as a Fight Master
- Manishankar Banerjee as Professor
- Nitya Ganguly as Abhi's uncle (special appearance)

== Soundtrack ==
Bolo Na Tumi Aamar

Soundtrack album by Jeet Gannguli
- Released: 2010
- Recorded: 2009
- Studio: Surinder Films
- Genre: Feature film soundtrack
- Language: Bengali
- Label: Surinder Films
- Producer: Surinder Films

Jeet Gannguli chronology
Thana Theke Aschi (2010)	Bolo Na Tumi Aamar (2010)	Target: The Final Mission (2010)

Singles from Bolo Na Tumi Aamar
- 1. "Bolo Na Tumi Amar" Released: 16 September 2018; 2. "Keu Elo Mone Mone" Released: 17 September 2018; 3. "Aaina Mon Bhanga" Released: 18 September 2018; 4. "Le Paglu Dance" Released: 19 September 2018; 5. "Hate You" Released: 20 September 2018

The soundtrack features 6 songs composed by Jeet Gannguli with lyrics written by Priyo Chattopadhyay, Chandrani Gannguli and Gautam Sushmit. The title song was shot in Singapore.

No.	Title	Lyric(s)	Artists	length
1	"Bolo Na Tumi Amar"	Gautam Sushmit	Jeet Gannguli, Monali Thakur	3:22
2	"Keu Elo Mone Mone"	Chandrani Gannguli	Jeet Gannguli, Chandrani Gannguli	4:35
3	"Aaina Mon Bhanga"	Priyo Chattopadhyay	Zubeen Garg	4:36
4	"Le Paglu Dance"	Priyo Chattopadhyay	Jeet Gannguli	3:39
5	"Hate You"	Priyo Chattopadhyay	Babul Supriyo, Monali Thakur	5:11

== Awards ==
- ZEE Bangla Gourav Samman Award for Best Film (Bolo Na Tumi Amar, 2010) - Nominated
- ZEE Bangla Gourav Samman Award for Best Actress (Bolo Na Tumi Amar, 2010) winner.
