= Bindaas (2014 film) =

- Theatrical poster
- Directed by: Rajiv Kumar Biswas
- Screenplay by: N. K. Salil
- Story by: Koratala Siva
- Produced by: Shrikanta Mohta; Shree Venkatesh Films
- Starring: Dev; Srabanti Chatterjee; Sayantika Banerjee
- Cinematography: J. Sridhar
- Edited by: Md. Kalam
- Music by: Songs: Savvy; Arindam Chatterjee; Habib Wahid; Devi Sri Prasad; Score: Chinni Krishna
- Distributed by: Shree Venkatesh Films; Jalsha Movies Production
- Release date: 25 July 2014
- Running time: 153:02 minutes
- Country: India
- Language: Bengali

Bindaas (English: Coolheaded) is a 2014 Indian Bengali language action drama film directed by Rajiv Kumar Biswas. It's a Shree Venkatesh Films production in association with Jalsha Movies Production. It is an official remake of Telugu movie Mirchi. The film stars Dev, Sayantika Banerjee, Srabanti Chatterjee and Chiranjeet Chakraborty in lead roles.

== Plot ==
The movie begins with Abhi (Dev) practicing guitar when a girl runs to him and asks him to save her from a gang of goons chasing her. Then Abhi, without fighting, resolves the conflict. The girl introduces herself as Kajol (Sayantika Banerjee). They slowly become friends. But one day, she asks Abhi to leave her and go as she cannot stand the separation from him if their relationship develops any further. He then goes back to India and changes the mind of Kajol's brother, and when they give him a vacation, he goes with him to his village. There, where everyone is conservative, he changes their nature and makes them more lovable.

When Kajol expresses her love for him, he tells his flashback. It is then revealed that he was born to their rival's family. His father (Chiranjeet Chakraborty) wanted to convert the people of his village. But his mother didn't want to stay there, so she left him. Later, when Abhi goes there, he falls in love with Anjali (Srabanti Chatterjee).

He starts taking revenge on the Kajol's family without revealing his identity. Then they decide to marry Abhi with Anjali because they are in love. During the marriage, the inspector tells his father that the hostility is rekindling because his son is taking revenge on the rivals. Soon afterwards, the rivals come and start killing everyone. After the fight, Abhi's mother dies. His father banishes him and blames him for her death. The story is now back to the present. Kajol's uncle challenges Abhi that if he can defeat his men, then he too would follow non violence. After successfully defeating them, her uncle asks Abhi that if he could defeat the rival's son (not knowing that it was Abhi himself), he would marry Kajol to Abhi.

Abhi gets angry at his stubbornness and reveals his true identity. He starts fighting with Kajol's uncle. Then all her family members come and convert him too. This was watched by his father, who had just arrived there. His father welcomes him back to the family. The film ends with him reuniting with Anjali.

== Cast ==
- Dev as Abhimanyu Sen aka Abhi
- Srabanti Chatterjee as Anjali
- Sayantika Banerjee as Kajol
- Chiranjeet Chakraborty as Dibakar Sen, Abhi's father
- Kharaj Mukherjee as Krishnochandra Singha
- Indrani Majumdar as Nandini/ Abhi's mother
- Sudip Mukherjee as Shankar, Abhi's uncle
- Amitabh Bhattacharjee as Goon
- Raja Dutta as Rudra, Kajol's elder brother
- Surajit Sen as Indra
- Supriyo Dutta as Kajol's Uncle
- Sumit Ganguly as Sukhdeb
- Tamal Roy Chowdhury as Rudra's Elder Brother
- Vashcar Dev as Bhava
- Raju Majumdar as Anjali's friend
- Madhumita Chakraborty as Kajol's mother
- Debomay Mukherjee as Sukhdeb's son
- Sunny Samarjit
- Esha Bhattacharjee as Kajol's aunt
- Ashim Roy Chowdhury as Abhi's College Professor
- Jayashree Mukherjee as Abhi's aunt
- Soma Banerjee as Sukhdeb's wife

== Production ==
The shooting of the film started on 25 November 2013. The main script writer and director were Rajiv Kumar Biswas. Parts of a song sequence have been shot across different locations in Spain and Greece. The first look of the lead characters: Dev, Srabanti and Sayantika was released on 10 May 2014.

== Soundtrack ==
Bindaas

Soundtrack album by Savvy, Arindom Chatterjee and Habib Wahid
- Released: July 2014
- Recorded: 2014
- Genre: Feature film soundtrack
- Language: Bengali
- Label: SVF
- Producers: Shrikanto Mohta; Jalsha Movies Production

Savvy chronology
Ami Shudhu Cheyechi Tomay (2014)	Bindaas (2014)	Yoddha - The Warrior (2014)

Arindam Chatterjee chronology
Bangla Naache Bhangra (2013)	Bindaas (2014)	Borbaad (2014)

Habib Wahid chronology
I Love You (2012)	Bindaas (2014)	Chuye Dile Mon (2015)

The soundtrack of the film has been scored by Savvy, Arindam Chatterjee, Habib Wahid and Devi Sri Prasad. The lyrics have been penned by Savvy, Riddhi Barua, Prasen, Priyo Chattopadhay and SA Haque Alik.

Track	Song	Singer(s)	Duration (min:sec)	Music	Lyricist
1	"Party Shoes"	Shadaab Hashmi and Neha Kakkar	3:45	Savvy	Riddhi Barua/Savvy
2	"Tomake Chere Ami"	Habib Wahid and Tulsi Kumar	4:37	Habib Wahid	SA Haque Alik
3	"Bhalobeshe Kono Bhool"	Arindom Chatterjee and Shalmali Kholgade	4.33	Arindom Chatterjee	Prasen
4	"Ajke Ei Khushir Dine"	Zubeen Garg	4:52	Devi Sri Prasad	Priyo Chattopadhay
5	"Remix Qawwali"	Nakash Aziz And Neha Kakkar	4:00	Savvy and Dev	Savvy

== Reception ==
=== Critical reception ===
Soma A Chatterji of The Indian Express reviewed the film and termed it as a "Bold film". Upam Buzarbaruah of Times of India rated the film 3/5 stars and wrote "It’s mindless, it’s violent, but it will surely entertain you. The storyline has all the ingredients that make for a perfect masala flick — action, drama, romance, comedy and of course, foreign locations. But, it’s the same old suave-hero-flaunts-muscles-and-thrashes-the-bad-guys stuff that has been done to death by filmmakers all over the world." He praised the songs, acting, action sequences and camerawork but criticised the film for relying on the same old hit formula for a commercial entertainer.
