= Bhootchakra Pvt. Ltd. =

2019 Indian Bengali-language film

- Film poster
- Directed by: Haranath Chakraborty
- Written by: Padmanabha Dasgupta
- Produced by: Nispal Singh
- Starring: Soham Chakraborty; Srabanti Chatterjee; Gaurav Chakrabarty; Bonny Sengupta; Rittika Sen
- Cinematography: Gopi Bhagat
- Edited by: Sujoy Dutta Roy
- Music by: Raja Narayan Deb
- Production company: Surinder Films
- Distributed by: Surinder Films
- Release date: 5 July 2019
- Country: India
- Language: Bengali

Bhootchakra Pvt. Ltd. is a 2019 Indian Bengali adventure horror film directed by Haranath Chakraborty and produced by Nispal Singh. The film starring Soham Chakraborty, Bonny Sengupta, Gaurav Chakrabarty, Srabanti Chatterjee, Rittika Sen, Kaushik Sen, Paran Bandopadhyay and Shantilal Mukherjee, is an adventure film and follows three boys and their search for ghosts. The film is a remake of 2017 Telugu movie Anando Brahma was released on 5 July 2019, under the banner of Surinder Films.

== Plot ==
Three youngsters Amit, Bonny and Nimai get a unique machine Bhootjantra, which is used to search for ghost. They were declared ghost hunters who can eradicate evil spirits. They start Bhootchakra Private Limited company and decide to make profit off it. The trio go to a haunted house where the family seeks their help. They stay there but unexpectedly their lies turn out to be true, the friends fall into serious trouble.

== Cast ==
- Soham Chakraborty as Amit
- Srabanti Chatterjee as Ranja
- Gaurav Chakrabarty as Nimai Bose aka Nimo
- Bonny Sengupta as Bonny Roy
- Rittika Sen as Khushi
- Paran Bandopadhyay
- Kaushik Sen
- Shantilal Mukherjee

== Release ==
The film was released on 5 July 2019.

== Soundtrack ==
All lyrics are written by Anupam Roy; all music is composed by Anupam Roy.

No.	Title	Singer	Length
1.	"Banchao"	Anupam Roy	3:17
2.	"Pari Na"	Anupam Roy	3:22
3.	"Na Na Jeyo Na"	Somlata	4:17
4.	"Aj Jyotsnaraate"	Jayati Chakraborty	4:05
