= Sudip Mukherjee =

Indian actor (born 1968)

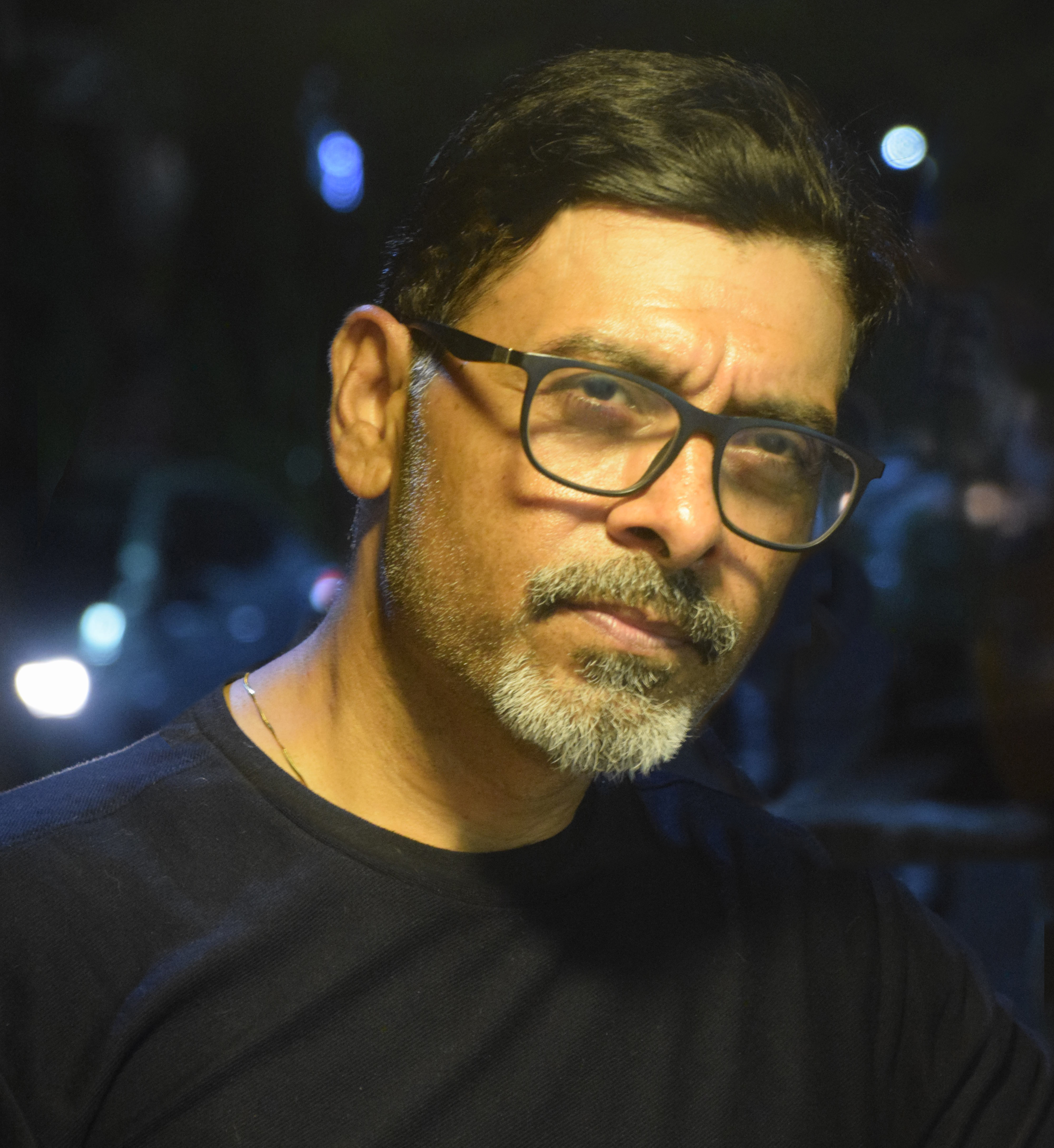
- Mukherjee in 2024
- Born: 27 September 1968 (age 57); Kolkata, West Bengal, India
- Occupation: Actor

Sudip Mukherjee is an Indian Bengali actor, who is predominantly known for his work in Bengali television and cinema. He has also featured in Hindi and Tamil-language films. He has acted in many television serials and films, including C.I.D. Kolkata Bureau, Sreemoyee, Chatrak, Bindaas, Ekka Dokka, Kantatar.

== Personal life ==
Sudip Mukherjee first married actress Damini Benny Basu (born 1982) in 2005. Damini was 14 years younger than him. They have one daughter together. They divorced in 2013. In 2015 Sudip married dancer Preetha Chakraborty (born 1993) who is 25 years younger than him. They have two sons together. They divorced in 2025.

== Filmography ==
=== Films ===
Year	Film	Role	Notes	Ref.
1995	Daughters of This Century			
2003	Sangee	Dipak		
2005	Kantatar	Binod		
2007	Jara Bristite Bhijechhilo			
2007	Greftaar	Indrajit Ghosh		
2008	Hello Kolkata	Partha		
2008	Takkar	Joydeb Chowdhury		
2011	Chatrak	Rahul		
2012	3 Kanya	Rajatabha Dutta		
2013	Bullett Raja	Goon	Hindi film	
2013	Villain	Sultan Bhai		
2013	Chhayamoy	Lakkhan		
2014	Borbaad	Akram		
2014	Kaththi	Arnab Chatterjee	Tamil film	
2014	Bindaas	Shankar		
2016	Dark Chocolate	Victor Banerjee		
2016	Power	Inspector S. Banerjee		
2016	Abhimaan	Yudhisthir Sardar		
2018	Naqaab	Police Officer, West Bengal Police		
2019	Ek Mutho Roddur			
2019	Sanjhbati	Bumba		
2019	Bornoporichoy	Senior Inspector Karmakar		
2019	Jaanbaaz	Shankar Singh		
2019	Atithi	Soutik		
2021	Ekannoborti	Sujan Chatterjee		
2023	The Eken: Ruddhaswas Rajasthan	Inspector Adarsha Srivastav		
2023	Chengiz	Commissioner Amit Dhar		
2024	Urmisha			
2024	Ajogyo	Parna's boss		
2025	Dhrubor Aschorjo Jibon			
2025	The Academy of Fine Arts	Kim Ling / Swapan		

=== Television ===
Year	Title	Role	Channel	Ref.
2006–2011	Erao Shatru	DSP Amit Mukherjee	Zee Bangla	
2011	Raashi		Zee Bangla	
2012–2014	C.I.D. Kolkata Bureau	Senior ACP Ekalavya	Sony Aath	
2013–2016	Bojhena Se Bojhena	Pratap	Star Jalsha	
2014–2015	Kanamachi	Master	Star Jalsha	
2016–2017	Agnijal	Acharya Dhiratna	Star Jalsha	
2019	Ami Sirajer Begum	Bhaskar Pandit	Star Jalsha	
2019–2021	Sreemoyee	Anindya Sengupta	Star Jalsha	
2022– 2023	Horogouri Pice Hotel	Sohini, Oishani & Debu's father (Dead)	Star Jalsha	
2022–2023	Ekka Dokka	Dr. Subhadip Sengupta	Star Jalsha	
2022–2023	Guddi	Pinaki Chatterjee	Star Jalsha	
2023–2024	Jol Thoi Thoi Bhalobasha	Dr. Kushagradhi Basu		
2023–2024	Badal Sesher Pakhi	Rohit and Mohit's father	Sun Bangla	
2024	Bodhua	Rana Roy Chowdhury	Star Jalsha	
2024	Roshnai	Nilarjo (Later replaced by Surojit Banerjee)	Star Jalsha	
2025–2026	Chirosakha	Swatantra Bose aka Nuton	Star Jalsha	

=== Web series ===
Year	Title	Role	Platform
2018	Chupkotha		Hoichoi
2022	Mahabharat Murders	Surojit Mukherjee, Commissioner of Kolkata Police	Hoichoi
2025	Dainee	Pata and Lata's father	Hoichoi
