= Paglu 2 =

- Directed by: Sujit Mondal
- Screenplay by: N. K. Salil
- Story by: Anil Ravipudi
- Based on: Kandireega
- Produced by: Nispal Singh
- Starring: Dev; Koel; Tota Roy Chowdhury; Rajatava Dutta; Rimjhim Mitra
- Cinematography: Kumud Verma
- Edited by: Rabiranjan Mitra
- Music by: Jeet Gannguli
- Production company: Surinder Films
- Release date: 31 August 2012
- Running time: 142 minutes
- Country: India
- Language: Bengali

Paglu 2 (translation: Crazy 2) is a 2012 Indian Bengali action comedy film directed by Sujit Mondal starring Dev and Koel in lead roles. This is the sequel to the Paglu series but storywise not a sequel of Paglu. A major portion of this movie has been shot in Dubai. This film is a remake of 2011 Telugu film Kandireega, directed by Santosh Srinivas and starring Ram and Hansika Motwani. The film grossed financially well.

== Plot ==
Dev is a high school dropout and a worthless village lad. He is hell-bent on getting married but the girl he wants to marry rejects him, stating he doesn't have a college education. Dev, who is clever and street-smart decides to go to Kolkata for further education. While traveling on the train, he bashes up a bunch of rowdies teasing college girls. At the college in Kolkata, he meets Riya and falls in love with her. A city gangster, Rudra, is in love with her and blackmails her to marry him. He beats anyone moving closely with Riya. Meanwhile, henchmen of the dreaded chieftain Dubai Keshto, from Dubai, are looking for Dev in the city. Dev then tries to take Riya but later comes to know that Dubai Keshto's daughter, Kavita, loves him after noticing his fight on the train. Then he pretends to leave Riya and marry Kavita, hatching a plan to take Riya and elope with her. Dev explains to Kavita about her attraction towards Dev, stating that it's not love, it's infatuation. Dev also tells her that what love is and how it happens, thus she gets his point correctly. When Dev explains to Riya why he shunned her in front of Dubai Keshto, Riya gets to understand the plan and co-operates with him. But it goes awry at the first attempt because of Rudra and Dubai Keshto's interference (as Rudra had told him earlier that Dev can't be a loyal son-in-law for him, saying not to trust him.). Dev tries to explain to her that he can't be her love anymore, he loves Kavita and no one is as special as her, thus fooling Keshto and proving Rudra wrong. How Dev make things clear and explains Dubai Keshto about his love for Riya after a lot of fun and confusion forms the rest of the story.

== Cast ==
- Dev as Dev (Paglu)
- Koel as Riya
- Tota Roy Chowdhury as Rudra
- Md Abdul Gony Rafid as Rafid
- Rajatava Dutta as Krishno Ghoshal aka Dubai Keshto, the most wanted person in CBI
- Rimjhim Mitra as Kabita Ghoshal, Dubai Keshto's daughter
- Biswajit Chakraborty as Dev's father
- Biswanath Basu as Dev's friend
- Sayak Chakraborty as Dev's friend
- Kharaj Mukherjee as Voice-over of Lord Shiva
- Pradip Dhar
- Bharat Kaul as Badshah Khan, Dubai Keshto's biggest enemy
- Mousumi Saha as Dev's mother
- Kunal Padhi as Riya's father

== Production ==
The filming was started from 19 January 2012. It has been filmed mostly across Kolkata and the deserts of Dubai in United Arab Emirates. Parts of the film has been also shot in Malaysia. The song sequences has been filmed in New Zealand and different parts of Europe, including Italy and Switzerland.

== Soundtrack ==
Paglu 2

Soundtrack album by Jeet Gannguli
- Released: August 2012
- Recorded: 2012
- Genre: Feature film soundtrack
- Length: 19:11
- Language: Bengali
- Label: Surinder Films
- Producer: Surinder Films

Jeet Gannguli chronology
Awara (2012)	Paglu 2 (2012)	Ekla Akash (2012)

Singles from Paglu 2
- 1. "Paglu 2 Title Song" Released: 31 May 2018; 2. "Khuda Jaane" Released: 4 Jun 2018; 3. "Habudubu Habudubu" Released: 7 Jun 2018; 4. "Ekta Premer Gaan Likhechi" Released: 11 Jun 2018

The soundtrack of the film has been composed by Jeet Gannguli. The lyrics have been penned by Prasen and Priyo Chattopadhyay.

Track listing
No.	Title	Lyrics	Singer(s)	Length
1.	"Ekta Premer Gaan Likhechi"	Prasen	Jeet Gannguli	3:54
2.	"Khuda Jaane"	Prasen	Zubeen Garg, Shyam Bhatt, Shreya Ghoshal	4:14
3.	"Paglu 2 Title Track"	Priyo Chattopadhyay	Mika Singh, Shreya Ghoshal	3:52
4.	"Habudubu Habudubu"	Prasen	Zubeen Garg, Akriti Kakkar	3:23
5.	"Paglu 2 Title Track Remix"	Priyo Chattopadhyay	Mika Singh, Shreya Ghoshal	3:48
Total length:				19:11

== Reception ==
=== Critical reception ===
A critic from the Times of India rated the film 3.5/5 stars and wrote "Paglu 2 is a typical commercial Bengali film. Want to enjoy a mad ride over the weekend? Paglu 2 s too tempting to say no." He praised the chemistry between the lead pair, situational comedy, Tota and Rajatava's prolific acting, Jeet Ganguli's music and the costume designer but bemoaned Dev's poor diction and the over excessive number of songs.

== Awards ==
- Anandalok Award 2012 for Best Actor (Male) - Nominated
- Anandalok Puraskar 2012 for Best Bengali film - Nominated
