= Jotugriho =

Bengali language film released in 2022

- Directed by: Saptaswa Basu
- Written by: Arnab Bhaumik; Rabi Shankar Choudhury
- Starring: Parambrata Chatterjee; Bonny Sengupta; Payel Sarkar
- Release date: 28 October 2022
- Country: India
- Language: Bengali

Jotugriho is a 2022 Indian Bengali language film which is directed by Saptaswa Basu. The film is written by Arnab Bhaumik and Rabi Shankar Choudhury. The film stars Parambrata Chatterjee, Bonny Sengupta, Payel Sarkar and Anshu Bach as lead characters.

== Plot ==
Upon taking up a new job, a hotel manager tries to unearth the mystery behind a seemingly haunted manor in the hills.

== Cast ==
- Parambrata Chatterjee
- Bonny sengupta
- Paayel Sarkar
- Anshu Bach
- Biswajit Ghosh

== Release ==
The film was released theatrically on 25 October 2022.

== Soundtrack ==
Jotugriho

Soundtrack album by Dabbu
- Released: 2022
- Genre: Film soundtrack
- Length: 16:47
- Language: Bengali
- Label: Nexgen Venture

Singles from Jotugriho
- 1. "Tui Takali Jei" Released: 24 October 2022; 2. "Barse Re" Released: 22 October 2022
