= Arshinagar =

2015 Indian Bengali film

- Official poster
- Directed by: Aparna Sen
- Written by: Sayan Biswas
- Screenplay by: Aparna Sen
- Based on: Romeo and Juliet by William Shakespeare
- Produced by: Shree Venkatesh Films
- Starring: Dev; Rittika Sen; Jisshu Sengupta
- Cinematography: Sirsha Ray
- Edited by: Rabiranjan Maitra
- Music by: Debojyoti Mishra
- Production company: Shree Venkatesh Films
- Distributed by: Shree Venkatesh Films
- Release date: 25 December 2015
- Running time: 151:18 minutes
- Country: India
- Language: Bengali

Arshinagar is a 2015 Bengali-language romantic tragedy film directed by Aparna Sen. The film features an ensemble cast that includes Dev, Rittika Sen, Jisshu Sengupta, Kaushik Sen, Waheeda Rehman, Kamaleshwar Mukherjee, Roopa Ganguly, and Jaya Seal Ghosh. The screenplay is an adaptation of Shakespeare's Romeo and Juliet. The trailer of the film was released on 25 November 2015.

== Cast ==
- Dev as Ranajit Mitra
- Rittika Sen as Julekha Khan
- Jisshu Sengupta as Tayyab
- Roopa Ganguly as Tayyab's Mother
- Waheeda Rehman as Dadijaan Ji
- Kamaleshwar Mukherjee as Khan Sahab
- Kaushik Sen as Sabir Khan
- Shankar Chakraborty as Biswanath Mitra
- Subhashish Mukherjee as Purohit
- Shantilal Mukherjee as minister
- Jaya Seal Ghosh as Madhu Mitra
- Aparajita Adhya as Najma
- Swagata Mukherjee as Fahtima
- Paran Bandopadhyay
- Sadif Rayhan
- Anindya Banerjee
- Anirban Bhattacharya as Monty
- Parvathy Baul in a special appearance
- Trina Saha as special appearance
- Priyanka Sarkar as Mrs. Gupta (Herself)
- Shataf Figar (cameo appearance)

== Production ==
=== Development ===
The film was announced to be a modern-day take on William Shakespeare's romantic-tragedy Romeo and Juliet. The film would have land mafia as its background, as told by Aparna Sen. Dev's character is based on Romeo and Rittika Sen's character to be based on Juliet. Dev would essay the role of a member of a band named, Garage Band. Rittika Sen, who made her debut in Borbaad, was selected as the lead heroine because Aparna Sen wanted someone who would look ten years younger than the lead actor, so Sen zeroed on her. Yesteryear legend, Waheeda Rehman, who worked with Aparna Sen in 15 Park Avenue, was selected to essay the role of Rittika's grandmother. Theatre actor Anirban Bhattacharya was initially roped to portray the main antagonist but then Jisshu Sengupta was selected to play the flamboyant negative character etched out on the lines of Tybalt, making his debut as a full-fledged antagonist. Anirban Bhattacharya was later on signed to play a supporting role. Apparently, Roopa Ganguly and Kaushik Sen had been cast as son and daughter of Waheeda Rahman, respectively. Actress Jaya Seal Ghosh and filmmaker Kamaleswar Mukherjee are also part of the film. While Jaya would play Dev's mother, Kamaleswar will be seen as Salim Saab, Rittika's music teacher. Shankar Chakraborty would enact the role of Dev's father, while Shantilal Mukherjee would essay the role of a corrupt politician.

=== Filming ===
The muhurat shot was held on 27 January 2015, whose pictures were posted by the makers on Twitter. Dev and Anindya Banerjee started shooting for Aparna Sen's Arshinagar at a city studio on 7 February 2015. Waheeda Rehman joined the shooting on 21 and 22 March.Kamaleshwar Mukherjee started shooting on 17 February 2015. Some scenes were filmed at the Bardhaman Rajbari in Alipore on Sunday afternoon. Besides Kolkata, shooting locations include Adina Mosque of Malda, Purulia and Mumbai.

== Box office report ==
Arshinagar Movie's total budget was 2.3 Crores and Movie Box office collects total 1.97 crores between 10 Days only. Movie first day Collection was 38 lakhs and opening week collection was 87 lakhs.
