= Biye.Com =

- Directed by: Abhijit Guha; Sudeshna Roy
- Produced by: Shyam Sundar Dey
- Starring: Joey Debroy; Bonny Sengupta; Koushani Mukherjee; Pallavi Chatterjee
- Cinematography: Pravatendu Mondal
- Edited by: Sujay Datta Ray
- Music by: Dabbu
- Production companies: Greentouch Entertainment; Shadow Films
- Distributed by: Zee5
- Release date: 20 November 2020
- Country: India
- Language: Bengali

Biye.Com is a 2020 Indian romantic comedy film directed by Abhijit Guha and Sudeshna Roy with ShyamSundar Dey as the producer. It stars Joey Debroy, Bonny Sengupta, Koushani Mukherjee, Payel Sarkar, Pallavi chatterjee and others.

== Cast ==
- Koushani Mukherjee
- Bonny Sengupta
- Payel Sarkar
- Pallavi Chatterjee
