= Classroom (film) =

2018 Indian Bengali film directed by Rajiv Kumar Biswas

- Official Poster
- Bengali: ক্লাসরুম
- Directed by: Rajiv Kumar Biswas
- Written by: Bidhan Das; Rajiv Biswas
- Starring: Sohail Dutta; Kuyasha Biswas; Supriyo Dutta; Kharaj Mukherjee
- Cinematography: Gopi Bhagat
- Edited by: Somnath Dey
- Music by: Dev Sen
- Production company: Joy Ram Cine Media
- Distributed by: Dev Entertainment Ventures
- Release date: 13 July 2018
- Country: India
- Language: Bengali

Classroom is a Bengali romantic drama movie which is directed by Rajiv Kumar Biswas.

It starred Kaushik Sen and Kharaj Mukherjee, Sohail Dutta, Kuyasha Biswas, Rudranil Ghosh, Supriyo Dutta. It was released on 13 July 2018. It is based on 2009 South - Korean film 4th Period Mystery.

== Cast ==
- Sohail Dutta
- Kuyasha Biswas
- Arya Dasgupta
- Koushik Sen
- Kharaj Mukherjee
- Rudranil Ghosh
- Supriyo Dutta
