= Kelor Kirti =

- Kelor Kirti Movie Poster
- Directed by: Raja Chanda
- Written by: N. K. Salil
- Screenplay by: N. K. Salil
- Story by: Sakthi Chidambaram
- Produced by: Shrikant Mohta; Nispal Singh
- Starring: Dev; Jisshu Sengupta; Ankush; Mimi Chakraborty; Koushani Mukherjee; Sayantika Banerjee; Nusrat Jahan
- Cinematography: Shailesh Awashthi
- Edited by: Md. Kalam
- Music by: S.P. Venkatesh
- Production companies: Shree Venkatesh Films; Surinder Films
- Distributed by: Shree Venkatesh Films
- Release dates: 6 July 2016 (India); 29 July 2016 (Bangladesh)
- Running time: 153:36 minutes
- Country: India
- Language: Bengali

Kelor Kirti is a 2016 Indian Bengali language comedy film. It was directed by Raja Chanda and produced by Shrikant Mohta and Nispal Singh under the banner of Shree Venkatesh Films and Surinder Films. The film stars Dev, Sayantika Banerjee, Jisshu Sengupta, Ankush Hazra, Mimi Chakraborty, Nusrat Jahan and Koushani Mukherjee. It is a remake of the 2005 Hindi film, No Entry, which was itself a remake of the 2002 Tamil film, Charlie Chaplin.

The film was released on 6 July 2016, on the occasion of Eid and Ratha Yatra. It received mostly negative reviews from critics and was a box office failure. The Times of India gave it 1.5 stars from 5.

== Synopsis ==
Joy, a news editor, is tired of being doubted by his suspicious-minded wife, Rima. His junior, Apurba, is a photographer who falls in love with Anushka, who initially misunderstands him. But Guru, a clever man and a playboy, is living a happily married life with Priya, who never doubts him. Trouble ensues when an enchanting woman, Urvashi, enters the three couples' lives, leading them to confusion, misunderstandings, and humorous situations, which end in chaos.

== Cast ==
- Jisshu Sengupta as Joy, editor of "News Portal"
- Dev as Guru
- Ankush Hazra as Apurba, Joy's junior
- Mimi Chakraborty as Rima (Joy's wife)
- Koushani Mukherjee as Anushka (Apurba's wife)
- Nusrat Jahan as Urvashi
- Sayantika Banerjee as Priya (Guru's wife)
- Kharaj Mukherjee as Gadadhar/Dhanudhar
- Rudranil Ghosh as Urvashi's friend
- Kanchan Mullick as Poncha Sastri, a greedy astrologer
- Biswajit Chakraborty as Home Minister Haranath Mittir
- Manasi Sinha as Minister's wife (cameo)
- Rohit Mukherjee as Anushka's father
- Debomay Mukherjee as Apurba's friend
- Rumpa Das as Bijli, Joy's housemaid
- Tori-Lao-Lee in a special appearance in the song "Love Me"

== Soundtrack ==
Kelor Kirti

Soundtrack album by Dev Sen & Indraadip Dasgupta
- Released: 1 July 2016
- Recorded: 2015–2016
- Genre: Feature film soundtrack
- Language: Bengali
- Label: SVF
- Producers: Shrikant Mohta; Nispal Singh

The soundtrack was composed by Dev Sen and Indraadip Dasgupta. It was released on 1 July 2016.

Track listing
No.	Title	Lyrics	Music	Singer(s)	Length
1.	"Darling"	Raja Chanda & Prasenjit Mallick	Dev Sen	Vicky A Khan, Madhuraa Bhattacharya & Prasenjit Mallick	3:39
2.	"Love Me"	Raja Chanda	Dev Sen	Vicky A Khan	3:41
3.	"Daddy"	Dev Sen & Prasenjit Mallick	Dev Sen	Prasenjit Mallick & Biswajeeta Deb	3:12
4.	"Item Bomb"	Prasen (Prasenjit Mukherje)	Indraadip Dasgupta	Madhubanti Bagchi, Rana Mazumder & Chorus	4:00
