= Saptaswa Basu =

Indian film director, producer, writer and editor

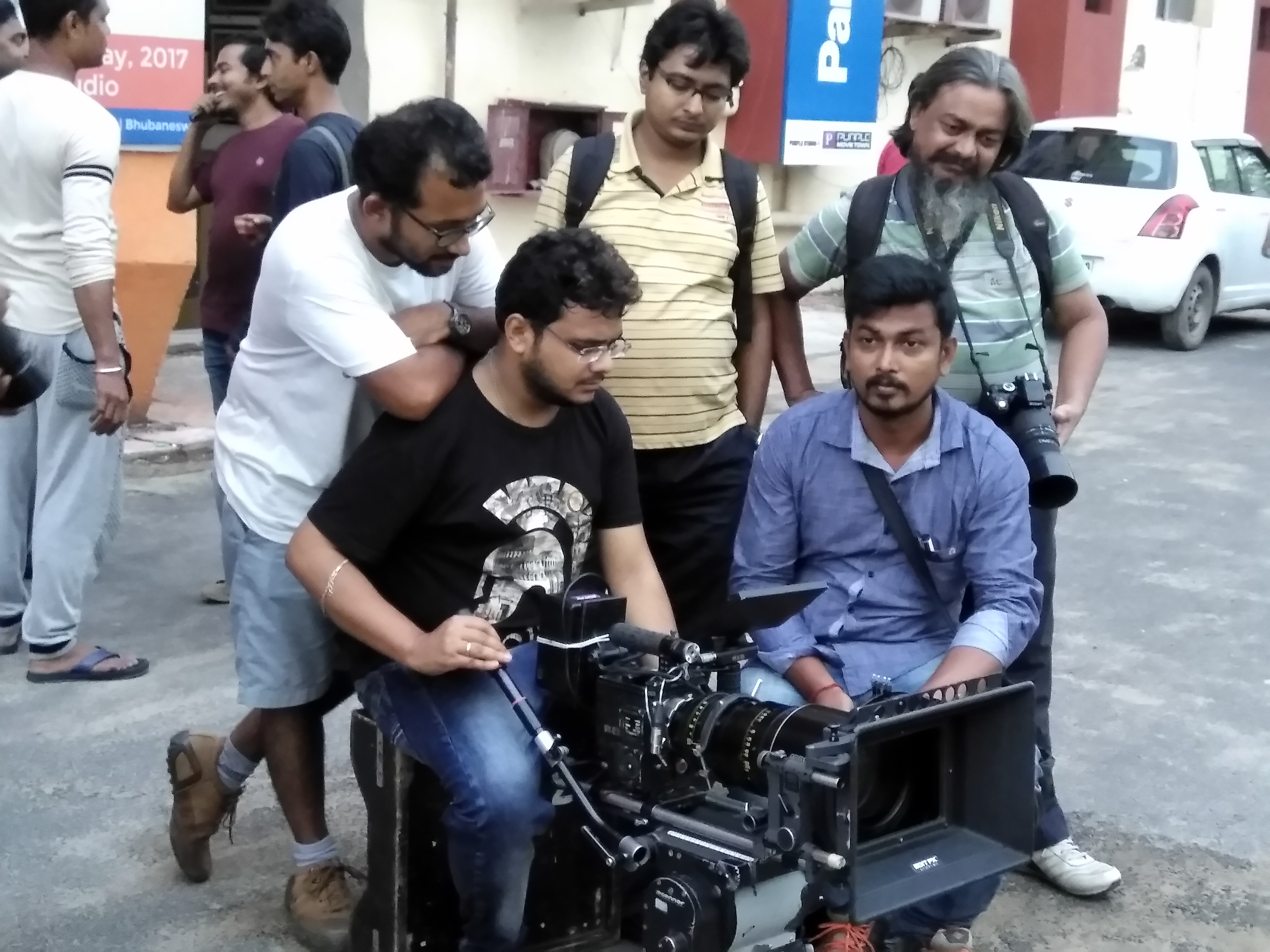
- Saptaswa Basu during shoot of Network
- Born: 6 May 1991 (age 34); Calcutta, India
- Occupations: Film director, screenwriter, film producer

Saptaswa Basu is an Indian film director, producer, writer and editor who has been involved in directing feature films, series and ad films.

== Career ==
Basu has been making feature films, ads, shorts as a director and has founded also his production house Neo Studios. Basu graduated as a student of Electronics and Communication Engineering from RCC Institute of Information and Technology. He started directing and editing shorts since the age of 17 years and gained much appreciation and acclaim in various film festivals. After completing college, he has started working making feature films projects. His most recent film is Doctor Bakshi, a sci fi thriller which has gained acclaim for its innovative concept. His debut feature film is called Network.

== Filmography ==
- Pratidwandi†
- Shree & I (2020 short)
- Network (2019)
- I/Witness (2010)
- Protibimbo (2010)
- Jugmapath (2010) (for AnandaUtsav.com)
- Fate/Fatal (2010)
- Giallo (Yellow) (2010)
- I/Witness 2 (2011)
- The Forlorn (2011)
- The Oasis (2012)
- Jotugriho (2022)
- Doctor Bakshi (2023)
- Dibakarer Odbhut Canvas (Series, 2023)
- Balaram Kando (2025)
- Deri Hoye Geche (2025)
