= Rittika Sen =

Indian actress and model

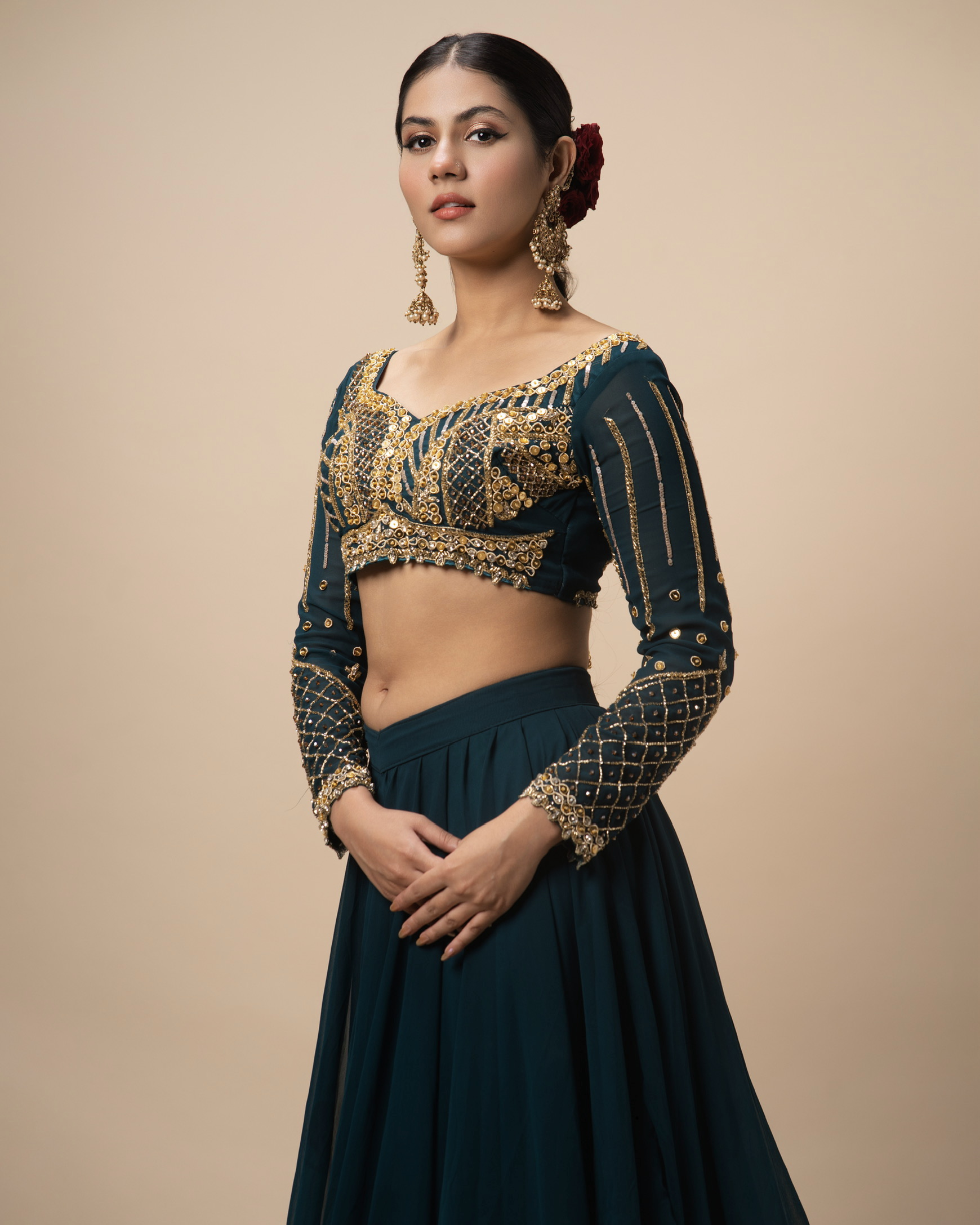
- Born: Rittika Sen
- Occupation: Actress
- Years active: 2012–present

Rittika Sen is an Indian actress who appears in Bengali and Tamil films. She was featured in the Calcutta Times list of Most Desirable Women 2015.

== Career ==
Rittika Sen first film was 100% Love. In the same year, Rittika appeared in the movie Challenge 2. She starred in the mainstream role in the movie Borbaad directed by Raj Chakraborty in 2014.

== Filmography ==
Denotes films that have not yet been released

- Note: All films are in Bengali, the language is otherwise noted.

Year	Films	Role	Ref.
2012	100% Love	Soniya	
2012	Challenge 2	Sreeja	
2014	Masoom	Twinkle	
2014	Borbaad	Nandini	
2015	Asche Bochor Abar Hobe	Piu	
2015	Arshinagar	Julekha Khan	
2016	Tui Je Amar		
2017	Jio Pagla	Shashikola	
2018	Raja Rani Raji	Esha	
2018	Villain	Sneha	
2018	Bagh Bandi Khela	Aditi Ray	
2019	Shahjahan Regency	Suprita	
2019	Bhootchakra Pvt. Ltd.	Khushi	
2019	O Bondhu Amar		
2020	Dagaalty	Malli	Tamil film
2020	Love Story	Ranja	
2020	Naanga Romba Busy	Meera	Tamil Television film
2021	Miss Call		
2021	Amar Challenge		
2022	Pratham Barer Pratham Dekha		
2024	Pambattam	Radhika	Tamil film
2026	Maharat		
2026	Kadhal Kadhai Sollava	Shreya	Tamil film
