= Tomake Chai (film) =

- Theatrical release poster
- Directed by: Rajiv Kumar Biswas
- Written by: Abhimanyu Mukherjee
- Screenplay by: Iswar Barik
- Story by: Nagasekhar
- Produced by: Shrikant Mohta; Mahendra Soni
- Starring: Bonny Sengupta; Koushani Mukherjee
- Cinematography: Gopi Bhagat
- Edited by: Md.Kalam
- Music by: Indradeep Dasgupta
- Production companies: Shree Venkatesh Films; Surinder Films
- Distributed by: Shree Venkatesh Films; Surinder Films
- Release date: 1 February 2017
- Running time: 123 minutes
- Country: India
- Language: Bengali
- Box office: ₹1 crore

Tomake Chai is a 2017 Indian Bengali romance film directed by Rajiv Kumar Biswas and produced by Shrikant Mohta and Mahendra Soni under the banner of Shree Venkatesh Films and Surinder Films. The film features Bonny Sengupta and Koushani Mukherjee in lead roles. It is a remake of award-winning 2011 Kannada movie Sanju Weds Geetha.

== Story ==
The movie is centered around a young couple, Joy (Bonny Sengupta) and Diya (Koushani Mukherjee) who fall in love in college. Diya and Joy are madly in love with each other, but Diya, who has been molested by her cousin from her childhood, reveals it to Joy and asks him to marry her. On the day of their marriage she is again molested by her cousin and Joy kills him to save Diya and goes to jail. In the course of time, Diya loses her memory and becomes pregnant and escapes from her home. Eventually she reaches the jail, where Joy was once kept. Diya dies in that jail, while Joy gets killed while escaping from the jail.

== Cast ==
- Bonny Sengupta as Joy Ghosh
- Koushani Mukherjee as Diya Sen
- Supriyo Dutta as Layer Ajay Sen & Diya's uncle
- Biswajit Chakraborty as Diya's father
- Biswanath Basu as Joy's uncle
- Raja Dutta
- Anindo Banerjee as
- Asim Ray Chowdhury
- Aniban Chakraborty
- Abonti Dutta
- Tonuka Chatterjee
- Sandy as Bhanu

== Soundtrack ==
Tomake Chai contains 4 songs composed by Indradeep Dasgupta and lyrics written by Prasen (Prasenjit Mukherjee). The songs are sung by Arijit Dev, Arijit Singh, Anwesha Datta Gupta and, Madhura.

Tomake Chai

Soundtrack album by Indradeep Dasgupta
- Released: 16 November 2017
- Recorded: 2016–2017
- Genre: Feature film soundtrack
- Language: Bengali
- Label: SVF
- Producer: Shrikant Mohta

Indradeep Dasgupta chronology
Haripada Bandwala (2016)	Tomake Chai (2017)	Ami Je Ke Tomar (2017)

No.	Title	Artist (s)	Length
1.	"Rongeen"	Arijit Dev	04:06
2.	"Tomake Chai (Title Track)"	Arijit Singh	04:45
3.	"Bhalolaage Tomake"	Arijit Singh & Anwesha Dutta Gupta	04:05
4.	"Din Eka Eka"	Madhura	05:05
5.	"Tomake Chai (Tropical Mix)"	Arijit Singh
