= Raja Rani Raji =

2018 Indian Bengali film

- Theatrical release poster
- Directed by: Rajiv Kumar Biswas
- Written by: Abhimanyu Mukherjee
- Produced by: Shrikant Mohta
- Starring: Bonny Sengupta; Rittika Sen
- Cinematography: Goopi Bhagat
- Edited by: MD Piyasuddin
- Music by: Dev Sen
- Production company: Shree Venkatesh Films
- Release date: 23 March 2018
- Running time: 161 minutes
- Country: India
- Language: Bengali

Raja Rani Raji (translation: King and queen agrees) is a 2018 Indian Bengali-language romanctic-comedy film, starring Bonny Sengupta and Rittika Sen directed by Rajiv Kumar Biswas. The movie was released on 23 May 2018, produced by Shrikant Mohta under the banner of Shree Venkatesh Films. It is a remake of the 2010 Tamil film Boss Engira Bhaskaran.

== Plot ==
Raja is a good-for-nothing fellow who repeatedly fails college examinations and spends his days idling with his friend Gobinda. Gobinda has a salon named Powerpaglu Saloon. While going for the final examination a third time, Raja suddenly comes across his classmate Isha and almost falls in love with her at first sight. However, Raja does not know the English language and fails to understand the meaning of the word ‘pardon’ that Isha always says after Raja's every proposal.

Raja's attempts at wooing Isha, under Gobinda's guidance, are not even unintentionally hilarious. Isha is getting just irritated. The studious Isha, who initially loathes Raja, suddenly finds him interesting when her elder sister marries Raja's elder brother, a veterinary doctor. Raja goes through his first reality check when he asks for Isha's hand in marriage from her elder sister, who is now his sister-in-law. She tells him that no one, not even Raja himself, would like to get his or her sister married to a fellow like him, who has no aspiration in life nor any source of income.

Raja aimed to earn an income in life. He challenged his family that in six months, he would get a job and earn money for himself. Despite knowing that Raja is incompetent, she asks for his forgiveness for prompting him to leave home in a fit of anger and sets out to help him by arranging a loan for some unknown purpose from the bank her father works for. Later, when she is almost convinced of Raja's worthlessness, she suddenly asks him to marry her and promises to take over his responsibilities.

Raja starts a tuition centre. All his appointed teachers fled, seeing the naughtiness of the failed Madhyamik students. Then he admitted a blind madam who is an M.A. passed science teacher, whom he met while buying a free mobile for Isha. Through his teaching, all students passed exams with good qualifications, and the coaching centre started to run with a good reputation.

But, as Gobinda insulted Isha's father at a conference for not giving Raja a loan, he chose another boy abroad, Aditya, for Isha's marriage. But as the boy is in a relationship with another girl, he confesses to Isha's father and proposes Isha's marriage to Raja. And the marriage of Isha and Raja takes place.

== Cast ==
- Bonny Sengupta as Raja
- Rittika Sen as Isha
- Parthasarathi Chakrabarty as Gobinda
- Supriyo Dutta
- Biswajit Chakraborty as Isha's father
- Yash Dasgupta in a cameo appearance as Aditya (ending climax)
- Simron Upadhyay as Raja's Sister

== Release ==
The official trailer of the movie released on 8 March 2018 and the film released on 23 March 2018.

== Soundtrack ==
Raja Rani Raji

Soundtrack album by Dev Sen, Aditya Sengupta & Lincon
- Released: 24 February 2018
- Studio: SVF Music; SVF Studios
- Length: 13:40
- Language: Bengali
- Label: SVF

The official soundtrack for Raja Rani Raji composed by Dev Sen, Aditya Sengupta and Lincon released on 24 February 2018.

All lyrics are written by Prasen (Prasenjit Mukherjee).

Track listing
No.	Title	Music	Singer(s)	Length
1.	"Boroloker Bitilo"	Dev Sen	Satrujit Dasgupta, Dev Sen	1:30
2.	"Jodi Raji Hosh"	Dev Sen	Raj Barman	3:35
3.	"Ja Hobe Dekha"	Lincon	Shaan, Mahalakshmi Iyer	3:25
4.	"Kholakhuli Bolte Gele"	Lincon	Raj Barman, Anweshaa	5:10
Total length:				13:40
