= Koushani Mukherjee =

Indian Bengali actress, model and politician

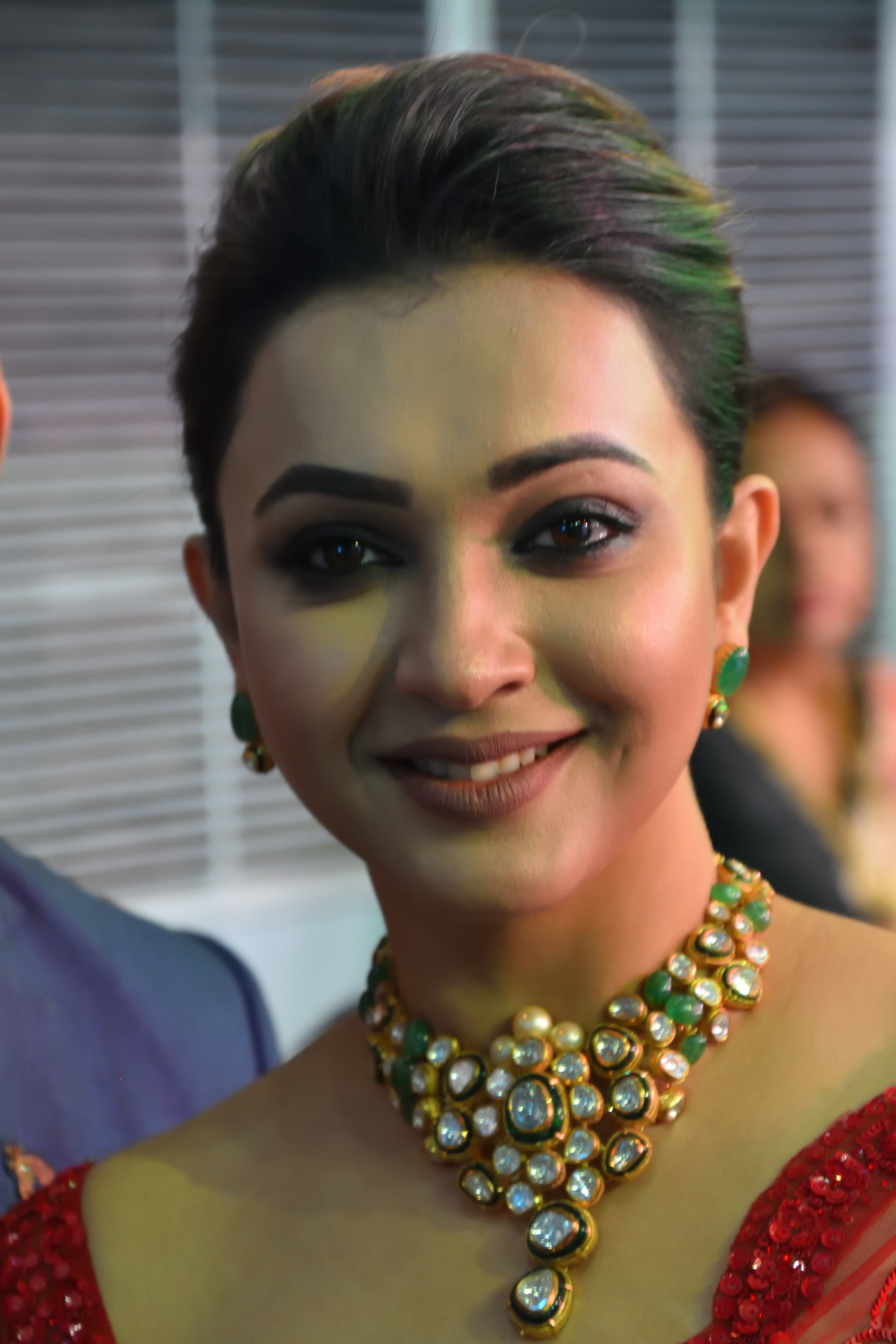
- Koushani Mukherjee at the 29th Kolkata International Film Festival
- Born: 17 May 1992 (age 34); Calcutta, West Bengal, India
- Occupations: Model; Actress; Politician
- Years active: 2015–present
- Political party: Trinamool Congress (2021–present)
- Awards: Miss Beauty of Kolkata

Koushani Mukherjee (born 17 May 1992) is an Indian actress and politician. She predominantly works in the Bengali film industry. Mukherjee made her debut in 2015 with the romantic comedy film Parbona Ami Chartey Tokey directed by Raj Chakraborty. She acted in a number of romantic comedy films in the consequent years including Kelor Kirti (2016), Jio Pagla (2017), Hoichoi Unlimited (2018) and Baccha Shoshur (2019).

In 2022, she acted in the Avijit Sen directorial Projapoti. In 2023, she made her OTT debut with Zee5 web series Abar Proloy directed by Raj Chakraborty. She received critical acclaim and commercial success with Bohurupi (2024) and Killbill Society (2025). Her performance in Bohurupi earned her a Anandalok Puraskar for the Best Actress and a nomination for the Best Actress at the 8th Filmfare Awards Bangla.

== Career ==
In 2015, Mukherjee won Miss Beauty of Kolkata.

Mukherjee began her film career in 2015 with Raj Chakraborty's movie Parbona Ami Chartey Tokey. In 2016, she appeared in Kelor Kirti, a romantic comedy directed by Raja Chanda. In Kelor Kirti, she plays a wealthy young woman, Anuskha, who falls in love with a journalist. In 2017, she was cast in Jio Pagla directed by Ravi Kinnagi. In 2019 she was signed as the cover for FFACE Fashion Calendar.

In the subsequent years, she acted in a number of romantic comedy films including Hoichoi Unlimited (2018) directed by Aniket Chattopadhyay, Jamai Badal (2019) directed by Ravi Kinagi and Baccha Shoshur (2019). She has collaborated with her fellow-actor Bonny Sengupta multiple times for playing the lead pair in their films. In 2022, she was cast in the drama thriller Antarjaal and adventure comedy Hirokgorer Hire. In the same year, she worked in the Avijit Sen directorial Projapoti, which emerged as the highest-grossing film that year.

In 2023, she made her OTT debut with the Zee5 Originals series Abar Proloy directed by Raj Chakraborty. In 2024, Mukherjee made her Dhallywood debut with Dark World. In the following years, she received widespread critical acclaim and commercial success with Bohurupi (2024) and Killbill Society (2025). Bohurupi eventually emerged as the fourth highest grossing Indian Bengali film of all time. Her performance in Bohurupi earned her a Anandalok Puraskar for the Best Actress and a nomination for the Best Actress at the 8th Filmfare Awards Bangla.

== Political career ==
In 2021, she joined Trinamool Congress. She contested in the 2021 West Bengal Legislative Assembly election as a TMC candidate from Krishnanagar Uttar Assembly constituency but finished in second position.

== Filmography ==
†	Denotes films that have not yet been released

Year	Films	Role	Director	Notes	Ref.
2015	Parbona Ami Chartey Tokey	Aparna Roy / Apu	Raj Chakraborty	Debut film	
2016	Kelor Kirti	Anushka	Raja Chanda		
2017	Tomake Chai	Diya	Rajiv Kumar Biswas		
2017	Jio Pagla	Monalisa	Ravi Kinagi		
2018	Hoichoi Unlimited	Anindita	Aniket Chattopadhyay		
2018	Girlfriend	Suchitra	Raja Chanda		
2019	Jamai Badal	Barsha	Ravi Kinagi		
2019	Baccha Shoshur	Jonaki	Biswarup Biswas		
2019	Jaanbaaz	Priya Sarkar / Lady Police Officer	Anup Sengupta		
2020	Biye.Com	Shreya	Abhijit Guha and Sudeshna Roy	Released on ZEE5	
2021	Tumi Ashbe Bole	Aankhi	Sujit Mondal		
2021	Phire Dekha			Released on ZEE5	
2022	Antarjaal		Prarjun Majumder		
2022	Hirokgorer Hire		Sayantan Ghoshal	Released on ZEE5	
2022	Shubho Bijoya		Rohan Sen		
2022	Projapoti	Jayashri Sen	Avijit Sen		
2023	Daal Baati Churma Chochhori	Barsha	Haranath Chakraborty	Also Producer	
2023	Abar Proloy	Mohini Maa / Moni	Raj Chakraborty	Web Series on ZEE5	
2023	Angshuman MBA	Lavanya	Abhijit Guha, Sudeshna Roy		
2023	Sob Koro Prem Korona		Debraj Sinha		
2024	Dark World	Shopno / Inspector Isha	Mostafizur Rahman Manik	Debut Bangladeshi film	
2024	Bohurupi	Jhimli	Shiboprosad Mukherjee and Nandita Roy	Nominated—Filmfare Award Bangla for Best Actress	
2025	Hungama.com	Archana	Dr.Krishnendu Chatterjee		
2025	Killbill Society	Poorna Aich	Srijit Mukherji		
2025	Raktabeej 2	Ayesha	Shiboprosad Mukherjee and Nandita Roy		
2026	Adalat O Ekti Meye	Joyeeta Choudhury	Kamaleshwar Mukherjee	Web Series on Hoichoi	
2026	Bohurupi: The Golden Daku	Jhimli Pramanik	Shiboprosad Mukherjee and Nandita Ray		
2026	Emperor vs Sarat Chandra	Chandramukhi	Srijit Mukherji		
2026	Mrigaya 1.5	SI Joyita Sen	Abhirup Ghosh		

== Television ==
Year	Title	Role	Channel	Notes	Ref.
2015	Akal Bodhon	Dance Performance	Star Jalsha	Mahalaya 2015	
2025	Dance Bangla Dance	Judge	Zee Bangla	Season 13	
2025	Matrirupeno Sanosthita	Devi Bhadrakali and Mahisasurmardini Bhadrakali	Star Jalsha	Mahalaya 2025	

== Awards ==
Year	Award	Category	Film	Result	Ref.
2015	Star Jalsha Parivar Award	Special Jury Award	Parbona Ami Chartey Tokey	Won	
2025	Anandalok Puraskar	Anandalok Best Actress Award	Bohurupi	Won	
2025	8th Filmfare Awards Bangla	Filmfare Award Bangla for Best Actress	Bohurupi	Nominated	
