= Sujit Mondal =

Indian film director

- Born: 5 October 1962 (age 63); Subhashgram, Kolkata, India
- Occupations: Film director; Screenplay writer
- Years active: 1995-present
- Known for: Saat Paake Bandha; Shedin Dekha Hoyechilo; Arundhati; Paglu 2

Sujit Mondal is an Indian film director and screenplay writer in Bengali cinema. He is best known for directing family dramas. He started his career as an assistant director for Vikram Bhatt.

He made his directorial debut in 2009 with Saat Paake Bandha. He directed Shedin Dekha Hoyechilo in 2010, which emerged as one of the highest-grossing Bengali film of that year. He directed Paglu 2 in 2012. In 2014, he directed Arundhati starring Koel Mallick, which was one of the most expensive Bengali movies of that year.

== Career ==
Sujit was chief assistant director for Ghulam (1998), Aap Mujhe Achche Lagne Lage (2002) andElaan (2205).

Mondal directed his debut feature film Saat Paake Bandha in 2009, starring Jeet and Koel Mallick. In 2009 he directed Bolo Na Tumi Aamar. His next releases Shedin Dekha Hoyechilo and Romeo, were commercially successful and earned him critical acclaim. In 2012, he directed the romantic comedy family drama Paglu 2. In 2014, he directed the horror thriller film Arundhati. He directed Tumi Ashbe Bole in 2021, starring Bonny Sengupta and Koushani Mukherjee and Toke Chara Banchbo Na in 2022.

== Cinematic Vision ==
The enduring characters, narrative, and timeless soundtrack of Mondal's films contributed to their popularity. He had a fondness for Bengal's multicultural society and its adaptations of many regional Indian films. Indian regional films and Bengali cult classics have an impact on him.

== Filmography ==
Denotes films that have not yet been released

Year	Film	Director	Screenplay	Production	Notes	Ref.
2009	Saat Paake Bandha	Yes	No	Shree Venkatesh Films and Surinder Films	Debut directorial film	
2010	Bolo Na Tumi Aamar	Yes	No	Surinder Films		
2010	Shedin Dekha Hoyechilo	Yes	No	Shree Venkatesh Films		
2011	Romeo	Yes	Yes	Shree Venkatesh Films		
2012	Paglu 2	Yes	No	Surinder Films		
2012	Bawali Unlimited	Yes	No	P. B. Films limited		
2013	Rocky	Yes	Yes	Shree Venkatesh Films		
2014	Arunndhati	Yes	No	Surinder Films		
2016	Hero 420	Yes	No	Eskay Movies and Jaaz Multimedia	Indo-Bangladesh joint production	
2018	Bagh Bandi Khela	Yes	No	Surinder Films	Television film	
2021	Tumi Ashbe Bole	Yes	No	Surinder Films		
2022	Toke Chara Bachbo Na	Yes	No	Surinder Films		
2027	Untitled film with Ankush Hazra and Soham Chakrabarty	Yes	No			

=== Assistant director ===
Year	Title
1998	Ghulam
2001	Kasoor
2002	Raaz
2002	Aap Mujhe Achche Lagne Lage
2002	Awara Paagal Deewana
2003	Footpath
2005	Elaan

== Awards ==
- ZEE Bangla Gourav Samman Award for Best Film Bolo Na Tumi Aamar, 2010- Nominated.
- Best Bengali film nominations for Anandalok Puraskar for Paglu 2 in 2012

== See also ==
- Ajoy Kar
- Haranath Chakraborty
