= Haripada Bandwala =

2016 Indian romantic comedy film

- Directed by: Pathikrit Basu
- Written by: Nada Paddu
- Screenplay by: N. K. Salil
- Story by: Pathikrit Basu
- Produced by: Shrikant Mohta; Mahendra Soni
- Starring: Ankush Hazra; Nusrat Jahan
- Cinematography: Iswar Barik
- Edited by: Md. Kalam
- Music by: Indradeep Dasgupta
- Production company: Shree Venkatesh Films
- Distributed by: Shree Venkatesh Films
- Release date: 23 December 2016
- Country: India
- Language: Bengali
- Box office: ₹5 crore

Haripada Bandwala is a 2016 Indian Bengali-language romantic comedy film directed by Pathikrit Basu in his directional debut. Produced by Shrikant Mohta and Mahendra Soni under the banner of Shree Venkatesh Films, it stars Ankush Hazra and Nusrat Jahan in lead roles. The songs are choreographed by Baba Yadav and Adil Shaikh.

It is a remake of 2014 Punjabi comedy film Disco Singh, which itself was loosely based on the 2009 Bollywood film Do Knot Disturb which in turn was a remake of the 2006 French film The Valet (French: La Doublure). The film was not successful at the box office.

== Plot ==
Haripada Poddar is an inspiring band musician who dreams of making a video album with his dream model and actress Sweety. But he is fed up of his fate that only one CD of his audio album was sold which resulted in a huge loss and he was deeply indebted, although he repeatedly addresses himself as the 'world-famous celebrity Haripada Bandwala'.

Nandalal a fierce don of the society (although comical in his attitude), along with his assistants- Sona and Mona go to kill Sukhendu Talapatra, a rich industrialist for some case of taking money from him. Nadalal orders Sona and Mona to throw the corpse in Ganga, although he knew they were very forgetful. Nandalal is very fearful of his wife Madhobi and goes to buy eatables and a gift for her as she ordered him. While returning home Nandalal notices a hoarding of Sweety posing for an advertisement of a soap, and falls for her. He thinks of bringing Sweety in a marriage party of his friend producer Dilip Da, by paying all the monetary charges.

Haripada is confronted over the phone for dues he took for loan for the CD album, but was unable to pay due to a loss incurred, and just then, he is informed to play his band at a wedding party. He finds Sweety there but can't have the chance to meet her because Nandalal who was present there was talking with her. A photographer sees the moment and takes snaps of Nandalal and Sweety talking but Haripada's photo came in between them when he was trying to meet Sweety. While returning home Haripada saves a girl named Sonia (Swastika Dutta) from some local goons and Sonia started liking him.

The photo was printed in news next day which is happened to be seen by Madhobi and she was furious by the news because it is rumored that Nandal and Sweety has an affair. Also, his father in law Dadoo (means Daddy) sees the news and calls him over the phone about what he is doing each and every time. To tackle the situation, Nandalal said his wife that, Sweety was talking to him along with her boyfriend (the photo of Haripada) for some matter. Although Madhobi not satisfactory, calls Gublu who calls himself 'James Bond, Bangla Version' her brother who is a detective to find out who is the boy in the photograph in the newspaper, whether he is with Sweety or not. Nandalal, also to fool the detective calls Haripada to act be with Sweety and also threatens Sweety for the same as to act like 'girlfriend-boyfriend'. He first tells Haripada to be with Sweety every time but cannot touch her, with four feet distance to maintain from her. But due to the detective's repeated observations on the two, Nandalal allows him to touch Sweety but no to go further than that. Again when the detective says that love without kissing is not love, Nandalal says to him to kiss her just like a sister. Sweety discovers Nandalal's instruction to Haripada and misunderstands Hari, thinking Hari would obey Nandalal. Instead, Haripada respects her showing his collections related to Sweety which makes Sweety likes him. Hari gifts her a sari in her birthday. Now Sonia started loving Haripada because he saves her from the goons many times, even once she provoked them, just to see whether Hari saves her.

Madhobi also falls in love with Haripada seeing his pictures all over in her rooms snapped by Gublu. But Haripada actually loves Sweety when she proposes him. But Nandalal tangles Haripada in trouble by giving him a gun to touch for his fingerprints and makes Sweety say that she acted and lied that she loved him, rather she is Nandalal's girlfriend. Hari is left heartbroken.

Problem arises when Talapatra's dead body is found in Ganga and Sona and Mona forget that they themselves have thrown it in the river, calls police. The Police inspector searches his house and Haripada is accused of murdering Talapatra, and imprisons him.

Sweety and Sonia along with Madhobi in love with Haripada Bandwala, go to release him from jail; it is revealed to Haripada that Madhobi is Nandalal's wife and Sonia is Nandalal's daughter. More comical events occur, when Nandalal arrives at that point to kill Haripada as his wife, daughter and his girlfriend all are in love with Haripada, a cheap band musician. At one juncture Dadoo arrives from Dubai, who is a greater don and actually made Nandalal a don of Kolkata.

He becomes soft after learning that Haripada Bandwala is an artist whose CD album he bought—the one person who bought his CD—and he listens to it every day. Nandalal is frustrated as his plan for harassing Haripada fails, and Dadoo promises him to help Haripada make a video album along with Hari's dream star Sweety.

== Cast ==
- Ankush Hazra as Haripada Bandwala, a band musician
- Nusrat Jahan as Sweety, Haripada's love interest
- Kharaj Mukherjee as Nandalal
- Biswanath Basu as Mona
- Kanchan Mullick as Gublu who calls himself James Bond Bangla Version
- Biswajit Chakraborty as Sukhendu Talapatra
- Supriyo Dutta as Inspector Sunil Pradhan
- Pradip Dhar as Sona
- Laboni Sarkar as Madhobi (Nandalal's wife)
- Swastika Dutta as Sonia
- Arindam Sil in a (Cameo appearance)
- Rajatava Dutta as Dadoo, father-in-law of Nandalal (special appearance)

== Soundtrack ==
Haripada Bandwala

Soundtrack album by Indradeep Dasgupta
- Released: 23 December 2016
- Genre: Feature film soundtrack
- Language: Bengali
- Label: SVF
- Producer: Shrikant Mohta; Mahendra Soni

Indradeep Dasgupta chronology
Aynabaji (2016)	Haripada Bandwala (2016)	Tomake Chai (2017)

The soundtrack album consisting of 5 original songs and 1 remix version is composed by Indraadip Dasgupta. All the lyrics are penned by Prasen. The music is distributed by Shree Venkatesh Films.

No.	Title	Singer(s)	Length
1.	"Shona"	Nakash Aziz, Antara Mitra	04:22
2.	"Bojhabo Ki Kore"	Arijit Singh, Anwesha Datta Gupta	04:47
3.	"Eksho Vrindaban"	Nakash Aziz, Payal Dev	04:02
4.	"Prem E Pagol"	Arijit Dev, Biswajeeta Dev, Swarnali Bhowmik	04:11
5.	"Bole De Na"	Timir Biswas	05:30
6.	"Shona (Remix)"	Nakash Aziz, Antara Mitra	3:00
