= 4th Period Mystery =

- Theatrical poster
- Hangul: 4교시 추리영역
- RR: 4gyosi churiyeongyeok
- MR: 4kyosi ch'uriyŏngyŏk
- Directed by: Lee Sang-yong
- Written by: Shin Jai-ho
- Produced by: Seo Myung-jin
- Starring: Yoo Seung-ho; Kang So-ra
- Cinematography: Moon Ho-jin
- Edited by: Kyung Min-ho
- Music by: Yozoh
- Production company: Sway Entertainment
- Distributed by: Lotte Entertainment
- Release date: 12 August 2009
- Running time: 86 minutes
- Country: South Korea
- Language: Korean
- Box office: US$360,944

4th Period Mystery (Korean: 4교시 추리영역), released internationally as The Clue, is a 2009 South Korean thriller film starring Yoo Seung-ho and Kang So-ra.

It was released on August 12, 2009, and drew a total of 67,602 admissions.

== Plot ==
Jung-hoon (Yoo Seung-ho) is the best student at his school. His rival, Tae-gyu (Jo Sang-geun), takes any and every opportunity to knock him down both verbally and physically, and the two are known enemies amongst the other students. One afternoon Tae-gyu pushes Jung-hoon too far and the latter threatens Tae-gyu with a knife, an act that's witnessed by another student. Jung-hoon walks away from the situation, but shortly after the beginning of 4th period class he returns to find Tae-gyu dead. The boy has been stabbed repeatedly, and still in shock, Jung-hoon picks up the bloody knife off a nearby desk just as Da-jung (Kang So-ra) shows up, catching him in a most incriminating position. Fortunately for him, she not only believes his innocence, but offers to help him to solve the mystery and catch the real killer – a task made particularly urgent by the fact that in 40 minutes the rest of the class will return and the body will be discovered. The pair set out in search of the murderer and soon discover that just about everyone's a suspect and even more unsettling, the murderer is now after them as well.

== Cast ==
- Yoo Seung-ho as Han Jung-hoon
- Kang So-ra as Lee Da-jung
- Cho Sang-geun as Kim Tae-gyu
- Jeon Joon-hong as Byung-soo
- Jeong Seok-yong as Kang Guk-man
- Park Chul-min as Han Kang-man
- Lee Young-jin as Sang-mi
- Kim Ji-eun as Student
- Kim Dong-beom as Do-il
- Lee Chan-ho as Tak Teu-in
- Min Kyung-jin as Principal
- Im Soo-hyang
- Sung Hyuk as a gym teacher
- Kim Yeong-ung as a history teacher

== Production ==
=== Casting ===
Originally, actress Kim So-eun was going to play the role of Dajung but she was replaced with Kang sora because of Kim's filming schedules for the TV series He Who Can't Marry.

=== Filming locations ===
The film was filmed in Sungsa Middle School in Goyang.

== Indian remakes ==
The 2016 Tamil movie Pencil is a remake of the movie. Also, the 2018 Bengali movie Classroom is another remake of the movie.
