= Borbaad (2014 film) =

- Borbaad official poster
- Directed by: Raj Chakraborty
- Written by: Abhimanyu Mukherjee; Vetrimaaran (Story)
- Produced by: Mahendra Soni; Shrikant Mohta
- Starring: Bonny Sengupta; Rittika Sen; Mainak Banerjee
- Cinematography: Subhankar Bhar; Supriyo Dutta
- Edited by: Rabi Ranjan Moitra
- Music by: Arindom Chatterjee; Binit Ranjan Maitra
- Production company: Shree Venkatesh Films
- Distributed by: Shree Venkatesh Films
- Release date: 14 August 2014
- Running time: 140 Minutes
- Country: India
- Language: Bengali

Borbaad (transl. Ruined) is a 2014 Indian Bengali language romantic thriller film directed by Raj Chakraborty and debut starring director Anup Sengupta actress Piya Sengupta's son & Indraneil Sengupta's nephew Bonny Sengupta and Rittika Sen in lead roles. The film was released on 14 August 2014. The film is a remake of Tamil film Polladavan (2007), while the romance between Bonny and Rittika is inspired from another Tamil film Sullan (2004).

== Plot ==
Joy is a worthless chap whose ambition in life is to buy a bike so that he can impress Nandini. While his life improves after he buys the bike, he lands a job and trouble starts soon after, when his bike gets stolen. He starts getting into an altercation with Imran, the younger brother of Akram, the local don, who is extremely hot headed than his elder brother. However the elder brother never harms elderly people but only targets people like him. How Joy manages to keep up his rivalry with Imran and yet come out unscathed till the end and retrieve his bike is what the story is all about.

== Cast ==
- Bonny Sengupta as Joyjit Basu
- Rittika Sen as Nandini
- Mainak Banerjee as local goon Imran
- Sudip Mukherjee as Akram, Imran's elder brother and a dreaded gangster
- Tulika Basu as Joy's Mother
- Prabir Dutta as Joy's Father
- Vashcar Dev as Rafiq
- Pradip Dhar as Ali Bhai
- Anindita Raychaudhury

== Soundtrack ==
Borbaad

Soundtrack album by Arindam Chatterjee, Subham Guha
- Released: 2014(A), 2020(Re-U/A)
- Recorded: Babege
- Genre: Feature film soundtrack
- Language: Bengali
- Label: SVF
- Producer: Shrikant Mohta

All lyrics are written by Prasen (Prasenjit Mukherjee); all music is composed by Arindom Chatterjee, Subham Guha Presents 'Rajarani' song in a new version.

No.	Title	Lyrics	Music	Singer(s)	Length
1.	"Parbona"	Prasen	Arindom	Arijit Singh, Prashmita Paul	4:48
2.	"Borbaad Hoyechi Ami"	Prasen	Arindom	Arindom Chatterjee	4:54
3.	"Ashona"	Prasen	Arindom	Arijit Singh, Prashmita Paul	3:52
4.	"Raja Rani"	Prasen	Arindom	Suvam Moitra	4:18
5.	"Borbaad (Title Track)"	Prasen	Binit Ranjan Maitra	Suraj Jagan	4:37
6.	"Parbona (Unplugged)"	Prasen	Arindom	Arindom Chatterjee	4:11
7.	"Parbona (Revisited)"	Prasen	Arindom	Arijit Singh, Prashmita Paul	5:31
8.	"Raja Rani (Revisited)"	Prasen	Arindom	Arijit Singh	4:14

== Critical reception ==
Borbaad got mostly mixed to negative reviews. Madhushree Ghosh of The Times Of India rated the movie 2 and a half stars out of 5. She states that Raj was not in a mood of making a good plot unlike his earlier films such as Proloy and Kanamachi and that's why he leans on making a merely dull love story and some amount of South Indian Film oriented violence. She was also highly critical towards the lead characters' performances stating a emotionless, dull, charisma-lacking acting by both Bonny and Rittika but praised the performance of Sudip Mukherjee as a Muslim Mafia Don. Shoma A. Chatterji of The Indian Express commented that "The editing and cinematography of the action scenes are credible and good but what fails the film miserably is the performance of the romantic lead portrayed by Bonny and Ritika. The only good thing about the movie is Sudip Mukherjee as a ruthless Mafia leader. But ultimately the film is a not-so good one of Raj Chakrobarty". But still it was a blockbuster at box-office
