= Sharthopor (soundtrack) =

2025 soundtrack album by Jeet Gannguli

Soundtrack album by Jeet Gannguli
- Released: 2025
- Recorded: 2024–2025
- Studio: Studio Vibrations, Kolkata
- Genre: Feature film soundtrack
- Length: 10:54
- Language: Bengali
- Label: Surinder Music
- Producer: Jeet Gannguli

Jeet Gannguli chronology
Shontaan (2024)	Sharthopor (2025)	Projapati 2 (2025)

Singles from Sharthopor
- 1. "Bhenge Jay" Released: 11 October 2025; 2. "Sujan Majhi Re" Released: 18 October 2025; 3. "Ei Shon" Released: 31 October 2025

Sharthopor is the official soundtrack album composed by Jeet Gannguli, to the 2025 Indian Bengali-language drama film of the same name directed by Annapurna Basu, starring Ranjit Mallick, Koel Mallick and Kaushik Sen. The film is produced by Nispal Singh under the banner of Surinder Films.

The soundtrack preceded with three singles—"Bhenge Jay", "Sujon Majhi Re" and "Ei Shon". Amit Chatterjee handled its score, with lyrics penned by Prasen and Ritam Sen.

== Background ==
The musical development of Sharthopor was driven by director Annapurna Basu's vision of a "rooted yet modern" drama. The film explores the fracturing of sibling relationships over ancestral property, necessitating a score that could evoke both childhood nostalgia and adult cynicism, which led Jeet Gannguli to adopt a minimalist approach for this project. Instead of synthesized layers and heavy percussion, he focused on live instrumentation and vocal vulnerability. It marks his twenty-seventh collaboration with Koel Mallick after Bandhan (2004), Yuddho (2005), Shubhodrishti (2005), Hero (2006), Eri Naam Prem (2006), Ghatak (2006), MLA Fatakeshto (2006), Minister Fatakeshto (2007), Premer Kahini (2008), Love (2008), Bor Asbe Ekhuni (2008), Mon Mane Na (2008), Saat Paake Bandha (2009), Jackpot (2009), Neel Akasher Chandni (2009), Bolo Na Tumi Aamar (2010), Dui Prithibi (2010), Mon Je Kore Uru Uru (2010), Paglu (2011), 100% Love (2011), Jaaneman (2012), Paglu 2 (2012), Rangbaaz (2013), Arundhati (2014), Herogiri (2015) and Besh Korechi Prem Korechi (2015).

As the film was released around the festival of Bhai Phonta (which celebrates the brother-sister bond), Gannguli reportedly timed the emotional peaks of the tracks to resonate with this seasonal sentiment, making the music a central part of the film's marketing and emotional reach.

== Musical structure ==
The soundtrack is defined by its "Acoustic-Folk" nature.

- The Flute as a Voice: Played by Sushanta Nandi, the flute acts as a recurring motif throughout the background score and songs, symbolizing the "innocent past" of the protagonists.
- String Dynamics: Unlike grand orchestral swells, the album utilized a Cello and Violin duet to create a sense of intimacy and "brokenness" in the score.
- Acoustic Textures: The rhythm sections are primarily driven by the Acoustic Guitar and Mandolin, providing a brittle, percussive quality that highlights the tension in the lyrics.

== Composition ==
=== Melancholic "realization" ballad ===
The first recorded song of the film was "Bhenge Jay", which was cited as "the emotional anchor of the film" by Basu. The "nature" of the song is one of fragility, reflecting the breaking of trust.

=== Folk-contemporary fusion ===
Drawing heavily from Bhatiali (river folk) traditions, the track "Sujan Majhi Re" used the metaphor of a boatman to navigate the complexities of identity.

=== Soft-rock ===
Sung from the perspective of an older sibling, the song is a call to remember childhood innocence. Considered as the most upbeat track on the album, it featured a melodic guitar riff and a rhythmic structure that mimics the steady pace of memories returning.

=== Background score ===
Amit Chatterjee used sharp, staccato strings for the courtroom sequences to represent the cold reality of property law, which contrasts sharply with Gannguli’s soft, melodic songs used during flashback sequences.

== Release ==
The soundtrack preceded with three singles: "Bhenge Jay" was the first to be released on 11 October 2025, followed by "Sujan Majhi Re" on 18 October 2025, and "Ei Shon" was released on 31 October 2025.

== Reception ==
The soundtrack was hailed as a "masterclass in simplicity" by Poorna Banerjee of The Times of India, receiving a 4.5/5 rating. She noted that Gannguli’s decision to move away from "theatrical" sounds in favor of "visceral" melodies allowed the performances of Koel Mallick and Kaushik Sen to resonate more deeply.

The track "Bhenge Jay" became a viral sensation on streaming platforms like Spotify and Apple Music, particularly among audiences who appreciated the modern "unplugged" Bengali aesthetic.

== Track listing ==
Track listing
No.	Title	Lyrics	Singer(s)	Length
1.	"Bhenge Jay"	Prasen	Lagnajita Chakraborty	3:05
2.	"Sujan Majhi Re"	Ritam Sen	Iman Chakraborty	4:46
3.	"Ei Shon"	Prasen	Rupankar Bagchi	3:03
Total length:				10:54
