= Projapati 2 (soundtrack) =

2025 soundtrack album by Jeet Gannguli

Soundtrack album by Jeet Gannguli
- Recorded: 2023
- Studios: Studio Vibration, Kolkata; Playhead studio, Mumbai; YRF Studios, Mumbai
- Genres: Feature film soundtrack, Bengali folk
- Length: 23:40
- Language: Bengali
- Label: Times Music Bangla
- Producer: Jeet Gannguli

Jeet Gannguli chronology
Sharthopor (2025)	Projapati 2 (2025)	Mitin: Ekti Khunir Sandhaney (2025)
External audio
- Projapati 2 Audio Jukebox on YouTube

Singles from Projapati 2
- 1. "Love You Papa" Released: 14 November 2025; 2. "Projapati Song" Released: 24 November 2025; 3. "Hasli Keno Bol" Released: 6 December 2025; 4. "Maa Esheche" Released: 16 December 2025; 5. "Aaj Theme Jaak" Released: 25 December 2025; 6. "Golpo Theme Jay" Released: 31 January 2026; 7. "Thak Pore Thak" Released: 25 February 2026

Projapati 2 is the soundtrack album, composed by Jeet Gannguli, to the 2025 Bengali film of the same name, directed by Avijit Sen starring Mithun Chakraborty and Dev in lead roles. The film is produced by Dev and Atanu Raychaudhuri under the banners of Dev Entertainment Ventures and Bengal Talkies. Rathijit Bhattacharjee provided its score.

The soundtrack had its release on 6 March 2026, featuring five songs with lyrics written by Prosen and Priyo Chattopadhyay. The album preceded with seven singles—"Projapati Song", "Love You Papa", "Hasli Keno Bol", "Maa Esheche", "Aaj Theme Jaak", "Golpo Theme Jay" and "Thak Pore Thak".

== Background ==
In February 2025, Jeet Gannguli agreed to work with Avijit Sen to compose for Projapati 2, in their second collaboration after Tonic (2021). In an interview with Anandabazar Patrika, Sen said that the music in the film has been used as a narrative to enhance the inherent drama of the situation without dialogue. The soundtrack accompanied traditional and electronic instrumentation.

Projapati 2 marks Gannguli's collaborations for the eighth time with Mithun Chakraborty, after working on Yuddho (2005), MLA Fatakeshto (2006), Minister Fatakeshto (2007), Tiger (2007), Herogiri (2015), Jole Jongole (2018) and Shontaan (2024), and the twentieth time with Dev, after working on I Love You (2007), Premer Kahini (2008), Mon Mane Na (2008), Challenge (2009), Paran Jai Jaliya Re (2009), Dujone (2009), Bolo Na Tumi Aamar (2010), Dui Prithibi (2010), Shedin Dekha Hoyechilo (2010), Paglu (2011), Romeo (2011), Paglu 2 (2012), Challenge 2 (2012), Rangbaaz (2013), Herogiri (2015), Love Express (2016), Chaamp (2017), Kidnap (2019) and Tonic.

Gannguli roped Nachiketa Chakraborty for the song "Aaj Theme Jaak", after their successful collaborations following "Bhola Jay Naa" from Jackpot (2009), "Jani Naa" from Challenge (2009), "Jage Re" from Prem Aamar (2009), "Keno Aajkal" from Josh (2010) and "E Mon Eka" from Tonic. He revealed that everyone present during the recording was moved to tears by Nachiketa's powerful singing style.

Ishan Mitra, who had previously lent his voice for Dev in his previous films, was suggested by the latter to Gannguli for the song "Love You Papa".

== Release ==
=== Singles ===
Projapati 2's soundtrack preceded with seven singles: "Love You Papa" was the first to be released on 14 November 2023. It was followed by the second single "Projapati Song" on 24 November, "Hasli Keno Bol" on 6 December, "Maa Esheche" on 16 December "Aaj Theme Jaak" released on 25 December 2025, "Golpo Theme Jay" on 31 January 2026 and "Thak Pore Thak" on 25 February 2026. The soundtrack was released on 6 March 2026, two months after the film's release.

== Track listing ==
Track listing
No.	Title	Lyrics	Singer(s)	Length
1.	"Love You Papa"	Prosen	Ishan Mitra, Adwita Shaw	2:30
2.	"Projapati Song"	Priyo Chattopadhyay	Jeet Gannguli	3:41
3.	"Hasli Keno Bol"	Prosen	Jeet Gannguli	3:44
4.	"Maa Esheche"	Priyo Chattopadhyay	Kumar Sanu	3:42
5.	"Aaj Theme Jaak"	Prosen	Nachiketa Chakraborty	3:09
6.	"Golpo Theme Jay"	Priyo Chattopadhyay	Iman Chakraborty	3:45
7.	"Thak Pore Thak"	Priyo Chattopadhyay	Timir Biswas	3:09
Total length:				23:40

== Background score ==
No.	Title	Length
1.	"Joy Panta"	1:28
