= Ghatak (2006 film) =

2006 Indian film by Swapan Saha

- Theatrical release poster
- Directed by: Swapan Saha
- Written by: N. K. Salil
- Story by: N. K. Salil
- Produced by: Nispal Singh
- Starring: Jeet; Koel Mallick; Tapas Paul; Anamika Saha; Rajatava Dutta; Shankar Chakraborty; Rajesh Sharma; Sumit Ganguly
- Cinematography: B. Satish
- Edited by: Suresh Urs
- Music by: Songs: Jeet Gannguli; Background score: S. P. Venkatesh
- Production company: Surinder Films
- Distributed by: Moserbear Video
- Release date: 15 December 2006
- Running time: 135 mins
- Country: India
- Language: Bengali

Ghatak (Bengali pronunciation: [ɡʱatak]; transl. Slayer) is a 2006 Indian Bengali-language political action film directed by Swapan Saha. Produced by Nispal Singh under the banner of Surinder Films, the film stars Jeet and Koel Mallick in the lead roles, alongside Tapas Paul, Anamika Saha, Rajatava Dutta, Shankar Chakroborty, Rajesh Sharma and Sumit Ganguly in other pivotal roles. It follows the transformation of an innocent into a vindictive man after witnessing the violent assassination of his brother by political gangsters.

Partially inspired by Elia Kazan's 1954 film On The Waterfront, the film is written by N. K. Salil, who described its generic structure as a "Political Western". Ghatak marks the second collaboration between Saha and Jeet, and also pairs Jeet and Koel for the sixth time. Predominantly shot in Kolkata and Hyderabad, its portions were filmed in Bangkok and Singapore. Soundtrack of the film is composed by Jeet Gannguli, while S. P. Venkatesh provided its score. B. Satish handled its cinematography and Suresh Urs did the editing.

Ghatak was theatrically released on 15 November 2006. It received positive response, especially critics were appraisals of its theme, screenplay, performances by the cast members, soundtrack and cinematography. Despite being one of the highest-grossing Bengali films of the year, the film was moderately successful at the box-office, earning over ₹32.7 crores. Ghatak has grown into a strong cult film over the years, with Jeet's performance as a crimefighter having been generally lauded. It was remade into Hindi as Shagird (2011), starring Nana Patekar.

== Plot ==
The film starts with several gruesome murders taking places in the streets and markets of Kolkata, where all the victims are revealed to be goons. Then DSP Ranabir Roy, the area's formidable police officer, apprehends the killer red-handed. While interrogating the vengeful Bijoy, the man behind the commission of those murders on public streets under the cover of night, Ranabir repeatedly addresses him as a "criminal"; provoked by this, Bijoy becomes agitated and begins to reveal the circumstances that had led to his horrific fate.

The film goes into a flashback, when Bijoy comes to Kolkata in order to make his younger brother Raju educated. Upon arriving in the Uttarpara locality of Kolkata, they witness firsthand the massive political uproar and indiscriminate bomb-throwing taking place there. They are left utterly terrified when they see Bablu Koley, the local terror and a rising leader of the opposition party, publicly murdering a passerby as well as his former henchman amidst the surging crowd. However, when the police arrives at the scene, they completely bundle several bystanders—including Bijoy and Raju into a van and cart them away as rioters, despite knowing Bablu's involvement to the murder. Meanwhile, Satyabrata Roy, a renowned lawyer for the Human Rights Commission, arrives there; his mere gaze was enough to make the blood run cold of the corrupt police officer, Basak. Satyabrata gives shelter to Bijoy and Raju in his home. While staying there, Bijoy begins working as a taxi driver for a reservation service. Puja, Satyabrata's daughter and a school teacher, arranges for Raju's admission to her school. Soon they change their lifestyle and become city dwellers. Gradually, a romantic relationship blossoms between Bijoy and Puja. However, Bindu Mashi, the ruling party's candidate, who has terrorized the locality even more than Bablu, finds herself locked in a conflict with Satyabrata. Mashi humbly requests Satyabrata to withdraw the legal case filed against her; yet, as a conscientious lawyer, Satyabrata refuses to do so. Consequently, Mashi murders him, an act that Raju witnesses by sheer coincidence. Mashi dispatches men to kill Raju; meanwhile, Bablu also sends his own men to capture Raju, intending to use him as the sole piece of evidence—his trump card, in order to file a complaint against Mashi with the Election Commission. In the interim, acting on the advice of Puja and her widowed mother, Bijoy decides to take Raju back to their village. At the railway station, a gunfight and arms clash erupt between the two rival factions vying to seize Raju; amidst the chaos, one of Masi's own henchmen riddles Raju's body with bullets.

Upon hearing these words from Bijoy, Ranbir offers him even greater encouragement, asserting that only a slayer like Bijoy can eliminate these enemies of society; otherwise, many more children like Raju would fall victim to their hands. He releases Bijoy, instructing him that should he ever set out to kill someone in the future, he must ensure the job is completed thoroughly; for, two of the individuals Bijoy had previously attacked were still alive and Ranabir had subsequently eliminated them in an encounter.

The fierce rivalry surrounding the upcoming Assembly election campaign is evident between Bablu and Mashi. Bablu, who had once murdered Mashi's husband, attempts to establish his dominance in her territory; yet, despite coming tantalizingly close to achieving his objective, he ultimately fails to succeed. Binoy Samanta, a corrupt minister supports and indulges both of them for his own profit. He always uses to roam around with Bablu during the campaign rallies; yet, the fact that he could not make it to Mashi's campaign left a deep impression on her mind. While campaigning, Mashi coolly threatens Puja, warning that not a single vote from their locality must be cast for the opposition; otherwise, she will definitely vow to exact retribution once the election is over. Although she projects a polite and courteous demeanor interacting cordially with the public during campaigns and rallies, everyone is well aware of her true nature; but out of fear of her brother as well as the area's notorious strongman Munna, no one dares to speak out.

Although Ranabir was on duty on election day, upon receiving reports of a disturbance at a polling booth in the Dakshinpara area, he leaves Basak in charge of their current post and departed to handle the situation there. Instigated by Basak, Munna and his gang barge into the booth, begin rigging on behalf of Mashi, and drive people away by threatening them with a revolver. Despite receiving reports from everyone regarding these events, Basak maintaines a complete silence on the matter. Meanwhile, when Puja enteres the booth, Munna permittes her entry and allows her to cast her vote without hindrance. However, when Puja refuses to vote for Bindu Mashi, Munna snatches away her scarf and attempts to molest her right there. During the ensuing scuffle, Puja sustains a cut on her lip that drew blood; as she flees the scene, Munna unleashes his goons to chase after her. At that very moment, Bijoy arrives on the scene and begin mercilessly thrashing Munna, along with all his goons—right inside the polling center. Basak raises his gun to stop him, but Bijoy proceeds to beat him as well for failing to take any action against the fraudulent voting and for pandering to Munna. When Ranbir finally arrives at the scene, Bijoy recounts the entire sequence of events to him. Collecting blood from the wound on Basak's forehead onto his thumb, Bijoy presses a thumbprint onto a blank sheet of a paper, serving as a witness for the arrest warrants against Munna and his cohorts, and hands it to Ranabir, instructing him to draft the accompanying text in accordance with standard procedure; then, taking Puja's scarf, he cast his vote and exited the premises.

Enraged, Bindu Mashi immediately rushes to the police station and begins hurling abusive threats at Ranabir, demanding Munna's release; however, she was ultimately forced to retreat, defeated by his unyielding and stubborn resolve. Moments later, by spreading a false rumor of a riot in the Uttarpara slum, thereby misleading Ranabir and the other officers into leaving the station, she dispatches a group of men to extract Munna. Storming into the station, her men assaulted the constables and other officers in an attempt to take Munna away. Meanwhile, upon reaching the slum and finding no signs of any disturbance, Ranabir realizes the true nature of the conspiracy; fearing the imminent escape of Munna, he races back to the station without delay. As he enters the premises, the sight of injured officers lying about confirmed his suspicions; yet, he was taken aback to find Bijoy sitting before the lock-up with the keys in hand, and to discover that—some twenty additional thugs had now joined them inside alongside Munna and his cronies. With this plan of hers also having been foiled, Mashi becomes absolutely consumed by rage. Following this incident, Bijoy storms into her hideout, and glaring menacingly at her, issues a counter-threat: just as they had all ganged up to kill Raju, he will kill them in exactly the same manner too.

Following his clash with Mashi, Bijoy gains a reputation in the area. He befriends with Baba Sheikh, who had once been the local strongman of the Muslim slums. Baba had even tried to throw his weight around with Bijoy on one occasion, but he later joined forces with him in the ensuing conflict rather than abusing his power, after Bijoy donated his blood to Baba's son who had been injured in a riot. In the meantime, Bablu approaches him by offering him a substantial sum of money to work for him; however, Bijoy issues him the exact same threat. Bablu gets utterly taken aback by this and, in a fit of rage, instructs Samanta to take action against him. Consequently, both Bablu and Mashi team up to eliminate Bijoy. Leveraging the opportunity afforded by a political career spanning many years, during which he had meticulously guarded his public image against any blemish, Samanta sends men to summon Bijoy, assuring him that he would personally apologize for Munna's despicable actions. Hoping to secure proper justice for Raju's murder and to see decisive measures taken to curb this reign of terror, Bijoy goes to Samanta's residence. However, Samanta reveals his true colors and demands Bijoy's thumbprint to a document withdrawing the case against Munna. When Bijoy refuses to comply, a group of goons rush in and pounce upon him. Mashi renders him unconscious by stricking him on the back of the head with a brass lamp stand, while Bablu proceeds to forcibly obtain his fingerprints. Armed with this bail document, she goes to the police station to secure Munna's release; however, in a fit of rage, Ranabir draws his pistol and aimed it at her. At that very moment, Samanta appears accompanied by his lawyer and dismisses himfrom the force accusing him of assaulting a woman inside the police station. Meanwhile, Bablu dumps Bijoy into a street manhole to a location far outside Kolkata, making him unable to climb back out.

Baba and Puja grow exhausted from searching for Bijoy in various places. One day, a child spots Bijoy down inside the manhole through a gap in the cover; he gathers a crowd and together they pull him out. To transport him to the hospital, people flag down a passing car, inside which sat Baba. He secretly took Bijoy to the hospital, where the latter gradually recovered and subsequently married Puja. Meanwhile, Bablu wins the by-election and a massive public rally was organized to felicitate him. Suddenly, emerging from the midst of the crowd, Bijoy steps onto the stage. A terrified Samanta screams out, and the police force immediately aim their guns at Bijoy. At that very moment, he pulls a ceremonial scarf from beneath his shirt, draps it around the necks of three individuals, and vowed that he would begin his campaign to destroy his enemies by starting with Bablu. He then vanishes from the scene amidst a chorus of triumphant cheers.

Late at night, while returning home by his car accompanied only by a driver, an intoxicated Bablu ignores his bodyguards with him. Suddenly, he notices that Baba is sitting in the driver's seat. He brings the car to a halt in front of a building that belonged to Bablu's own construction firm. Getting frightened, Bablu flees the vehicle, enters the building and sees Bijoy approaching him with a pistol in hand, like the god of death, amidst the darkness. Bijoy shoots Bablu, who plummeted from the ninth-story rooftop. His murder sends shockwaves through the entire locality. Both Samanta and Mashi become extremely vigilant. Mashi devises a new strategy to neutralize Bijoy: disguised as a nurse, she abducts the pregnant Puja from the hospital elevator. However, when the elevator doors opens, Mashi gets caught completely off guard—Bijoy is standing there with a knife held to Munna's throat. Left with no other choice, she releases Puja.

Puja is not happy with Bijoy's activities, as she feels it can harm both him and his family. But Bijoy pays no heed to anything whatsoever. One evening, gun in hand, he chases Munna and shoots him right in the middle of a crowded market in front of everyone. Consumed by the fire of vengeance, Mashi launches an attack on Bijoy's home reeling from the grief of Munna's death. When Bijoy takes Puja out for a medical check-up, Mashi take his mother-in-law in hostage. Moments later, upon returning and ringing the doorbell, Puja is chased by Mashi's men as they fling the door open. Meanwhile, sensing danger, Bijoy rushes back and gives chase. However, the thugs once again end up getting soundly thrashed by Vijay. Concluding that subduing Mashi is the only viable option, Bijoy barges into Samanta's office one day; threatening him at gunpoint, he orders him to do his bidding. Samanta subsequently convenes a massive press conference at his farmhouse, announcing his intention to put an end to the city's mafia rule—a campaign he declares will begin with Mashi. Driven solely by his fear of Bijoy, Samanta publicly identifies Masi as the "mastermind" behind a litany of crimes: the murders of Satyabrata and Raju, Bablu's disappearance, and even the attempted vehicular homicide of Bijoy's wife. In a desperate bid to preserve his own pristine public image, Samanta plans to flee to Delhi with a dossier detailing all of Bindu Mashi's corrupt activities. Meanwhile, holding a razor to Basak's throat, Baba forces him to feed Mashi a pre-planned lie, misleading her into believing that Samanta has pressured the police to issue a "shoot-at-sight" order against her. Driven by it, Mashi storms Samanta's residence and brutally murders him before he escapes.

On the way back, as they pass the cremation ground, a group of dhol players suddenly block the path of Mashi's car. Their leader is revealed to be Ranabir, who speaking in his characteristic satirical tone, announces that having quit the police force, he has now embarked on a new profession: whenever he receives advance news of someone's demise, he rushes to the scene with his dhol and cymbal players. Mashi gets utterly terrified when she observes Bijoy emerging from the shadows. Moving to the rhythm of the drums, he single-handedly lifts and slams a mob of thugs to the ground, thoroughly subduing them. Mashi, displaying a psychotic behavior, lungs at him; however, Bijoy repeatedly lashes her with a whip. Managing to break free by sheer force, Mashi attempts to run him over with her car; but Bijoy leaps into the air just as Mashi's vehicle crashes into a transformer and gets exploded.

Bijoy then confides in Ranabir, confessing his intention to leave the city so that his child would not have to grow up amidst the suffocating web of crime that plagues the place. However, Puja and Baba arrive on the scene and implore him not to abandon the city, urging him to stay for the sake of Raju's memory. In his imagination, Bijoy hears Raju's voice assuring him that he would forever live on within them.

== Cast ==
- Jeet as Bijoy
- Koel Mallick as Puja, a school teacher and Bijoy's wife
- Anshu Bach (credited as Master Anshu) as Raju, Bijoy's brother
- Tapas Paul as DSP Ranabir Roy
- Anamika Saha as Bindu Mashi
- Rajatava Dutta as Binoy Samanta, a high-ranked politician
- Shankar Chakroborty as Bablu Koley, Bindu Mashi's opposition
- Rajesh Sharma as Baba Sheikh
- Sumit Ganguly as Munna, Mashi's brother
- Bodhishattwa Mazumdar as Adv. Satyabrata Roy, a lawyer of the human rights commission and Puja's father
- Santana Basu as Satyabrata's wife
- Mrityun Hazra as SI Basak
- Ashok Mukherjee as principal

== Themes and influences ==
Initially N. K. Salil wanted to adapt the 1954 American film On The Waterfront, which had already been remade into Hindi twice as Kabzaa in 1988 and Ghulam in 1998. Later, he dropped the idea to write the script as a political satire, as per Saha's suggestions with whom he had collaborated in the blockbuster MLA Fatakeshto in that same year, also in the same genre.

While writing, Salil borrowed inspirations from his own story which he had penned for Anandamela magazine in the 1990s. He described the film as a "Political Western", where a stranger arrives a turbulent place and gradually transforms the situation there—a classic template of the Western genre, save for the absence of long-wide shots. He also satirized Mamata Banerjee in Bindu Mashi's character, which became very popular and gained a cult attention.

== Soundtrack ==
Ghatak

Soundtrack album to Ghatak by Jeet Gannguli
- Released: 2006
- Studios: Studio Om, Kolkata; YRF Studios, Mumbai
- Genre: Feature Film Soundtrack
- Length: 20:17
- Language: Bengali
- Label: V Music
- Producer: Jeet Gannguli

Jeet Gannguli chronology
Priyotoma (2006)	Ghatak (2006)	Minister Fatakeshto (2007)

Jeet Gannguli composed the soundtrack of Ghatak in his third collaboration with Saha. It also marks his eighth and seventh collaborations with Jeet and Koel respectively, with the former after working on Premi (2004), Bandhan (2004), Yuddho (2005), Shubhodrishti (2005), Hero (2006), Kranti (2006) and Priyotoma (2006), and with the latter after working on Bandhan, Yuddho, Shubhodrishti, Hero, MLA Fatakeshto (2006) and Eri Naam Prem (2006). The soundtrack contains five tracks, in which three are penned by Priyo Chattopadhyay and the rest by Gautam Sushmit.

Gannguli composed the track "Aaj Tora Sesh Dinete" felicitating two songs sung by Kishore Kumar: "Bolo Hori Bol" from Anusandhan (1981) and "Dekhle Kemon Tumi Khel" from Anyay Abichar (1985), each composed by R. D. Burman and written by Gauriprasanna Mazumder. The song "Mon Dole Dole Dole" topped the music charts at that time and still is considered as "the love anthem" by Radio Mirchi 98.3.

Track listing
No.	Title	Lyrics	Singer(s)	Length
1.	"Swapno Koto Swapno Jibone"	Priyo Chattopadhyay	Babul Supriyo, Risha	3:34
2.	"Ei Neel Sagarer Pare"	Priyo Chattopadhyay	Shaan, June Banerjee	4:52
3.	"Mon Dole Dole Dole"	Priyo Chattopadhyay	Shaan, Mahalaxmi Iyer	5:03
4.	"Alo Ashar Alo"	Gautam Sushmit	Babul Supriyo, Shreya Ghoshal	3:07
5.	"Aaj Tora Sesh Dinete"	Gautam Sushmit	Amit Kumar	3:39
Total length:				20:17

== Release ==
The film was released on 15 December 2006.

== Reception ==
Arnab Bhattacharya of The Telegraph opined "Anamika, probably the first ever lady don in Bengali movies, thrusting her sabre effortlessly into people’s bellies, she seems to be Tollywood’s answer to the criticism of male dominance in today’s films."
