= Fatakeshto =

- Fatakeshto
- Directed by: Swapan Saha
- Screenplay by: N. K. Salil
- Produced by: Shrikant Mohta; Mahendra Soni
- Starring: Mithun Chakraborty; Koel Mallick; Soumitra Chatterjee
- Music by: Jeet Gannguli
- Production company: Shree Venkatesh Films
- Distributed by: Shree Venkatesh Films
- Release dates: 14 April 2006 (MLA Fatakeshto); 8 June 2007 (Minister Fatakeshto)
- Country: India
- Language: Bengali

Fatakeshto is a series of Indian action films, directed by Swapan Saha. The first film MLA Fatakeshto was released in 2006, and the second film Minister Fatakeshto was released in 2007.

== Cast and characters ==
Character	Films	
Character	MLA Fatakeshto (2006)	Minister Fatakeshto (2007)
Krishnadeb Chatterjee Fatakeshto	Mithun Chakraborty	Mithun Chakraborty
The Chief Minister of West Bengal	Soumitra Chatterjee	Soumitra Chatterjee
Chaitali Roy	Koel Mallick	Koel Mallick
Sandhya Chatterjee Fatakeshto's wife	Debashree Roy	
Ratan Basak / Manatosh Panja	Sumit Ganguly	Sumit Ganguly
Ranadeb Pal	Rajatava Dutta	
Durjoy Nag	Bharat Kaul	
Haridas Pal	Shantilal Mukherjee	
Raj Barman		George Baker
The Home minister		Deepankar De
Biswanath		Shankar Chakraborty
Manasi Mukherjee		Locket Chatterjee
A goon		Kaushik Banerjee
‘’Unknown’’		Dulal Lahiri

== Crew ==
Occupation	Film	
Occupation	MLA Fatakeshto (2006)	Minister Fatakeshto (2007)
Director	Swapan Saha	Swapan Saha
Producer(s)	Shree Venkatesh Films	Shree Venkatesh Films
Screenplay	N. K. Salil	N. K. Salil
Composer(s)	Jeet Gannguli	Jeet Gannguli

== Influence ==
The first film MLA Fatakeshto is famous for introducing the dialogue "মারব এখানে, লাশ পড়বে শ্মশানে" (I will hit here and the body will be there at the shmashana).

== Accolades ==
Year	Film	Occasion	Award	Awardee	Result
2006	MLA Fatakeshto	Anandalok Awards	Best Villain	Rajatava Dutta	Won
2007	Minister Fatakeshto	Anandalok Awards	Best Film	Minister Fatakeshto	Won
2007	Minister Fatakeshto	Anandalok Awards	Best Actor	Mithun Chakraborty	Won
