= Ravi Kinagi =

Bengali and Odia film director

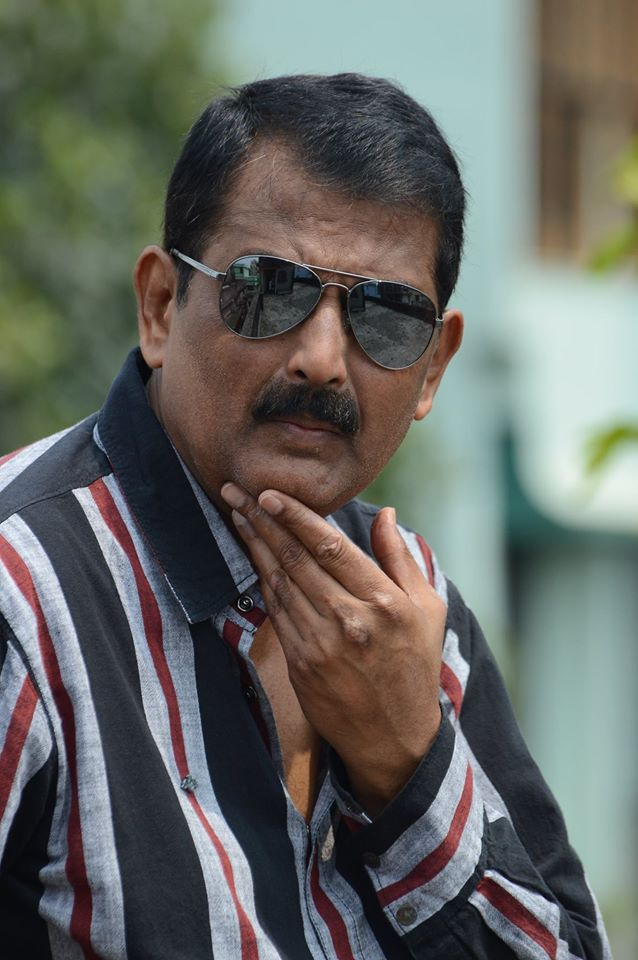
- Born: 19 October 1955 (age 70); Mumbai; Maharashtra; India
- Occupation: film director
- Years active: 1990–2021
- Notable work: Annadata; I Love You; Premer Kahini; Paran Jai Jaliya Re; 100% Love; Awara; Herogiri

Ravi Kinagi (alternative spellings: Rabi Kinagi, Rabi Kinnagi) is an Indian film director, documentary editor, and screenwriter. He works predominantly in Bengali and Odia cinema.

== Biography ==
Ravi Kinagi was born into a Kannada-speaking family. He learned the basics of filmmaking from his father Shankar Kinagi who was a producer and director. He was born and brought up in Mumbai. He worked with Rajshri Films when they were making Paheli, Naiyya, and Kanoon Ka Shikar. He also assisted S Ramanathan, Anil Ganguly, and Prashant Nanda. He then directed two Marathi films, Manuski and Halahal. Later he started making Odia films and later shifted to the Bengali film industry.

=== As director ===
Denotes films that have not yet been released

Year	Film	Language	Cast
1990	Jibansangee	Bengali	Tapas Paul; Archana Joglekar
1998	Sonar Khancha		
1998	Putuler Pratishodh		
2002	Annadata	Bengali	Prosenjit Chatterjee; Sreelekha Mitra
2003	Champion	Bengal	Jeet; Srabanti Chatterjee
2004	Premi	Bengali	Jeet; Jisshu U Sengupta; Chandana Sharma
2004	Mastan	Bengali	Jeet; Swastika Mukherjee
2004	Bandhan	Bengali	Jeet; Koel Mallick
2005	Yuddho	Bengali	Mithun Chakraborty; Debashree Roy; Jeet; Koel Mallick
2006	Agni Pariksha	Bengali	Prosenjit Chatterjee; Priyanka Trivedi
2007	I Love You	Bengali	Dev; Payel Sarkar
2008	Premer Kahini	Bengali	Dev; Koel Mallick
2008	Bhalobasa Bhalobasa	Bengali	Hiran; Srabanti Chatterjee
2009	Poran Jaye Jolia Re	Bengali	Dev; Subhashree Ganguly
2010	Wanted	Bengali	Jeet; Srabanti Chatterjee
2010	Josh	Bengali	Jeet; Srabanti Chatterjee
2011	Fighter	Bengali	Jeet; Srabanti Chatterjee
2012	100% Love	Bengali	Jeet; Koel Mallick
2012	Awara	Bengali	Jeet; Sayantika Banerjee
2013	Deewana	Bengali	Jeet; Srabanti Chatterjee
2014	Bangali Babu English Mem	Bengali	Soham Chakraborty; Mimi Chakraborty
2015	Herogiri	Bengali	Mithun Chakraborty; Dev; Koel Mallick; Sayantika Banerjee
2015	Jamai 420	Bengali	Soham Chakraborty; Hiran; Ankush; Payel Sarkar; Mimi Chakraborty; Nusrat Jahan
2016	Ki Kore Toke Bolbo	Bengali	Ankush; Mimi Chakraborty
2017	Ami Je Ke Tomar	Bengali	Ankush; Nusrat Jahan; Sayantika Banerjee
2017	Jio Pagla	Bengali	Jisshu Sengupta; Soham Chakraborty; Hiran Chatterjee; Bonny Sengupta; Srabanti Chatterjee; Payel Sarkar; Rittika Sen; Koushani Mukherjee
2019	Jamai Badal	Bengali	Hiran; Payel Sarkar; Koushani Mukherjee
2021	Miss Call	Bengali	Soham Chakraborty; Rittika Sen

=== Screenplay ===
- Bhalobasa Bhalobasa

=== Odia film ===
Year	Title	Cast	Notes
1986	Manini		
1988	Suna Chadhei		
1989	Ama Ghar Ama Sansar		
1990	Pardesi Chadhei		
1990	Jiban Sanghi		
1991	Bhishma Pratigya		
1994	Bhai Hela Bhagari		
1996	Suna Panjuri		
1997	Kandhei Aaakhire Luha		
1998	Stree		
1999	Pabitra Bandhan		
2002	Sindura Nuhein Khela Ghara		
