= Refugee (2006 film) =

2006 Indian action film

Refugee রিফিউজি
- Theatrical release poster
- Directed by: Haranath Chakraborty
- Written by: N. K. Salil
- Story by: V. Vijayendra Prasad
- Produced by: Shrikant Mohta; Mahendra Soni
- Starring: Prosenjit; Rambha; Rudranil Ghosh; Biplab Chatterjee; Rajesh Sharma; Rishabh Prasad
- Narrated by: Rishabh Prasad
- Cinematography: Saswata Dutta
- Edited by: Arindam
- Music by: Jeet Gannguli
- Production company: Shree Venkatesh Films
- Distributed by: Sushovan Mukherjee
- Release date: 7 November 2006
- Country: India
- Language: Bengali
- Budget: 1.0 cr
- Box office: 2.5 cr

Refugee is a 2006 Indian Bengali-language action film directed by Haranath Chakraborty and produced by Shrikant Mohta and Mahendra Soni under the banner of Shree Venkatesh Films. It stars Prosenjit Chatterjee as a prominent refugee from Bangladesh and Rambha as the female lead, with Rishabh Prasad as the narrator and the couple's manservant in the film.

== Cast ==
- Prosenjit as Shiba
- Rambha as Julie
- Rajesh Sharma
- Rudranil Ghosh as Ashok
- Biplab Chatterjee
- Jagannath Guha
- Chandan Sen
- Ratna Ghoshal
- Kalyani Mondal as Shiba's mother
- Nimu Bhowmik
- Rishabh Prasad as manservant

== Soundtrack ==
Refugee

Soundtrack album by Jeet Gannguli
- Released: 2006
- Recorded: 2005
- Studio: Shree Venkatesh Films
- Genre: Feature film soundtrack
- Language: Bengali
- Label: SVF

Jeet Gannguli chronology
MLA Fatakeshto (2006)	Refugee (2006)	Kranti (2006)

Singles from Refugee
- 1. "E Keora" Released: 5 March 2015; 2. "Sathire O Sathire" Released: 5 January 2019; 3. "Jhilmil Jhilmil" Released: 5 January 2019; 4. "Kancha Pirit Pakia Dilo" Released: 5 January 2019

The music of the film has been composed by Jeet Gannguli. The lyrics have been written by Gautam Sushmit and Priyo Chattopadhyay.

No.	Title	Lyrics	Singer(s)	Length
1.	"E Keora"	Gautam Sushmit	Amit Kumar, Pamela Jain	3:46
2.	"Jhilmil Jhilmil"	Gautam Sushmit	Babul Supriyo	3:41
3.	"Kancha Pirit Pakia Dilo"	Priyo Chattopadhyay	Miss Jojo	4:45
4.	"Sathire O Sathire"	Priyo Chattopadhyay	Jeet Gannguli, Mahalakshmi Iyer	4:56
5.	"Maer Kole"
