= Saat Paake Bandha =

- Poster of Movie
- Directed by: Sujit Mondal
- Written by: Bhupathi Raja
- Screenplay by: N.K. Salil
- Story by: Bhupathi Raja
- Produced by: Shree Venkatesh Films; Surinder Films
- Starring: Jeet; Koel Mallick; Ranjit Mallick; Subhashish Mukherjee; Laboni Sarkar; Locket Chatterjee
- Music by: Jeet Gannguli
- Release date: 29 May 2009
- Running time: 149 minutes
- Country: India
- Language: Bengali

Saat Paake Bandha is a 2009 Indian Bengali-language romantic drama film directed by Sujit Mondal. The film starred Jeet and Koel Mallick, who also featured in Ghatak in 2006.

== Plot ==
Rahul, the son of a wealthy but traditional industrialist, returned home to his father after completing his education in foreign lands. When the father tries to persuade him into marriage he puts up a fantastic condition - that he will marry the girl of his father's choice and will live as a married couple for one year only, after which, if either of the two seems to feel distant from the other, the marriage will be called off. Surprisingly, the traditional father agrees and chooses Pallavi, his PA as the most appropriate bride.

Pallavi's family consisted of her widowed mother, an elder sister deprived of her husband, a younger brother not at all competent for any job, and the youngest sister, pregnant for a boyfriend trying to avoid responsibilities. So Pallavi, just to save her family, accepted the contract much against her wishes and thus began a way of life with both of the wedlocked couple leading an unreal lifestyle.

Although Rahul and Pallavi shared the same bed, Rahul seemed distant and hardly cared about his wife's feelings. He never celebrated Pallavi's birthday, and his rude comments about her cooking often hurt her. It felt as though he stayed with her only out of duty rather than love. However, the story becomes a little hard to believe when Rahul, after recovering from a coma thanks to Pallavi's constant care, tells that their contract will end the next day and that he plans to divorce her. At this point, the audience might expect the story to end sadly, but the intermission comes as a surprise, leaving them wondering what will happen next.

In the second half we see that the table turns as Rahul suddenly feels sympathetic to Pallavi and all his passions overwhelms him so much that he rushes to his in-laws' house and requests Pallavi's return. But no says the director, and the story goes on with Pallavi now rejecting all the ardent proposals of Rahul, be it him buying all the shares of Pallavi's new struggling organization just to secure for himself the position of Pallavi's boss. Surprises seem to be on store for the audience with Pallavi conceiving a child (just imagine that Rahul was in comatose for a pretty long time and the day he recovered, the couple separated) and now Rahul, in sympathy arranges for an AC bus for her and shifts her office to the ground floor. Now the only thing that remains is revelation and Pallavi invites and insults Rahul in one of the most improbable of settings with Rahul sophisticatedly defending his views.

Now, it's the final part. Rahul with his friend Kesto arranges a last chance to bring back Pallavi. Rahul plans to act as beaten by some goons who were after their company for a long time. Pallavi instantly runs to see Rahul just after getting the news. But, on the way she incidentally learns everything. So, at that condition she goes to Rahul's house to insult him again and close the whole chapter completely. But, the matter turns more serious, when she finds out Rahul really severely injured and that he was not acting. She also gets wounded while trying to help Rahul. Next, we find out Rahul somehow taking Pallavi to the Maternity Ward.

Finally after all these, the two again reunites in hospital bed and they celebrate the simultaneous delivery of the child and Rahul's recovery from his critical condition. Thus family ties are again restored and the happy ending is guaranteed.

== Cast ==
- Jeet as Rahul Banerjee
- Koel Mallick as Pallavi Banerjee
- Ranjit Mallick as Subhankar Banerjee, Rahul's Father
- Locket Chatterjee as Pallavi's Sister
- Laboni Sarkar as Pallavi's Mother
- Subhasish Mukherjee as Krishnokanto Barman aka Keshto, Rahul's friend
- Premjit Mukherjee as Shankar
- Nitya Ganguly as Shibu Kaka, Rahul's house servant
- Supriyo Dutta as Manager
- Monalisa Pal as Pallavi's sister
- Anirban Guha as Pallavi's brother

== Soundtrack ==
Saat Paake Bandha

Soundtrack album by Jeet Gannguli
- Released: 2009
- Recorded: 2008
- Studios: Shree Venkatesh Films, Surinder Films
- Genre: Feature film soundtrack
- Language: Bengali
- Label: Surinder Films
- Producer: Shree Venkatesh Films

Jeet Gannguli chronology
Mon Mane Na (2008)	Saat Paake Bandha (2009)	Jackpot (2009)

Singles from Saat Paake Bandha
- 1. "Aami Banophool Go - Gollay Maley Goal" Released: 26 December 2018; 2. "Swapno Jeno Pelo Bhasha" Released: 27 December 2018; 3. "Boro Eka Eka Lagey Aamar" Released: 1 January 2019; 4. "Sinthir Sindur" Released: 2 January 2019; 5. "Bolo Piya (Female)" Released: 3 January 2019; 6. "Bolo Piya (Male)" Released: 3 January 2019

All lyrics are written by Gautam Sushmit, Priyo Chattopadhyay; all music is composed by Jeet Gannguli.

Track listing
No.	Title	Lyrics	Singer(s)	Length
1.	"Aami Banophool Go - Gollay Maley Goal"	Late Pranab Roy, Priyo Chattopadhyay	Late Kanan Devi, Shaan	4:01
2.	"Swapno Jeno Pelo Bhasha"	Priyo Chattopadhyay	Kunal Ganjawala, Mahalakshmi Iyer	4:25
3.	"Boro Eka Eka Lagey Aamar"	Gautam Sushmit	Jeet Gannguli	4:41
4.	"Sithir Sindur"	Priyo Chattopadhyay	Sadhna Sargam	3:55
5.	"Bolo Piya (Female)"	Gautam Sushmit	Mahalakshmi Iyer	2:10
6.	"Bolo Piya (Male)"	Gautam Sushmit	Sonu Nigam	1:05
