= Hero (2006 film) =

- Hero Movie Poster
- Directed by: Swapan Saha
- Written by: N. K. Salil; Puri Jagannadh
- Produced by: Nispal Singh
- Starring: Jeet; Tapas Paul; Koel Mallick; Laboni Sarkar; Kanchan Mullick
- Edited by: Lokesh; M. Susmit
- Music by: Jeet Gannguli
- Production company: Surinder Films
- Distributed by: Eagle Video
- Release date: 3 February 2006
- Running time: 140 minutes
- Country: India
- Language: Bengali

Hero is a 2006 Indian Bengali-language romantic action film directed by Swapan Saha. This film's music was composed by Jeet Ganguly.This film was released under the banner of Surinder Films. It is a remake of the 2002 Kannada film Appu.

== Plot ==
Subhankar Roy was a college goer. He was the son of head constable Bhabani Shankar Roy, who was a very respectable person and had an excellent police record in the department. He aspires for his son to be a police officer of higher rank, although he is himself a constable. He had great aspirations for his son. Subhankar, on the other hand, was a very arrogant, loving, and happy-go-lucky person who loved spending time with friends, gossiping, and playing foul games. One such game he played with some anti-socials was eloping with their sister on her marriage day and giving her hands to someone else. They attacked him, and bleeding Subhankar was taken to hospital by Puja Sen, and she donated her blood to him as his blood group got matched with hers. Shuvo fell in Love with Puja without seeing her face at first instant. He went to her to thank her for saving his life, but instead, he said, "I Love You," which Puja surprisingly rejected. Then, he started meeting her everywhere and started annoying her against her wishes. Puja was the sister of Police Superintendent Indrajit Sen. Puja told her brother about Shuvo and her intense hatred towards him for his annoying attitude by which he forcefully wanted Puja. Bhabani Shankar was Indrajit's close mate, and he saved the latter's life in a mishap. Since then, Indrajit owes his life to him and thinks of him as his best friend in the most challenging times.

Shuvo was threatened and beaten by Indrajit for disturbing his sister, unaware that he was the son of none other than Bhabani Shankar, to which Bhabani Shankar opposed him and said Love has no religion and no caste. Meanwhile, Indrajit hired an anti-social goon, Baburam, to kill Shuvo to which Puja couldn't resist as she didn't want to kill him and went off to save Shuvo, but accidentally Puja got injured and Shuvo hospitalized her. Seeing all his constant approaches and faithful Love for her, Puja starts falling in Love with Shuvo, to which Indrajit doesn't accept their relationship as he still thinks that Shuvo is not a perfect match for his sister, and he still annoys her. Indrajit tried to kill Shuvo at any cost. But with the help of Madhabi and his friends, Shuvo and Puja escaped from their house. Baburam harassed them, but ultimately, Love won over hatred, so Indrajit accepted Puja and Shuvo's relationship and agreed to their marriage. Both of them finally got married.

== Cast ==
- Jeet as Subhankar Roy aka Shuvo, Son of Head constable Bhabani Shankar Roy
- Tapas Paul as SP Indrajit Sen
- Koel Mallick as Puja Sen, Sister of Indrajit Sen
- Laboni Sarkar as Madhabi Sen, Puja's Sister-in-law
- Samata Das as Latika, Subho's Sister
- Kanchan Mullick as Shuvo's college friend
- Abdur Razzak as Head constable Bhabani Shankar Roy, Shuvo's Father
- Sumit Ganguly as Baburam, a local goon
- Shantilal Mukherjee as Mejo Babu, Police Constable
- N.K. Salil as Shuvo's college friend
- Kalyani Mondal as Mamata, Shuvo's Mother
- Shyamal Dutta as Police Inspector

== Soundtrack ==
Hero

Soundtrack album by Jeet Gannguli
- Released: 2006
- Recorded: 2005
- Studio: Surinder Films
- Genre: Feature film soundtrack
- Language: Bengali
- Label: Surinder Films

Jeet Gannguli chronology
Shubhodrishti (2005)	Hero (2006)	Eri Naam Prem (2006)

Singles from Hero
- 1. "Aaha Mori Sundori" Released: 12 Jun 2019; 2. "Allah Allah" Released: 13 Jun 2019; 3. "Bhalobasa Aalo Aasha" Released: 14 Jun 2019; 4. "Bhalo Lage Swapnoke" Released: 15 Jun 2019; 5. "Jibone Prothom Eto Kachhe" Released: 17 Jun 2019; 6. "Mon Jake Khoje" Released: 20 Jun 2019

All lyrics are written by Gautam Sushmit, Priyo Chattopadhyay; all music is composed by Jeet Gannguli

Track listing
No.	Title	Lyrics	Singer(s)	Length
1.	"Aaha Mori Sundori"	Gautam Sushmit	Babul Supriyo, Sabeha	4:23
2.	"Allah Allah"	Priyo Chattopadhyay	Krishna	5:47
3.	"Bhalobasa Aalo Aasha"	Priyo Chattopadhyay	Sonu Nigam	3:36
4.	"Bhalo Lage Swapnoke"	Priyo Chattopadhyay	Shreya Ghoshal, Sonu Nigam	5:35
5.	"Jibone Prothom Eto Kachhe"	Gautam Sushmit	Shaan, Shreya Ghoshal	5:30
6.	"Mon Jake Khoje"	Gautam Sushmit	Shaan	5:35
