= Jaaneman (2012 film) =

- Jaaneman Movie Poster
- Directed by: Raja Chanda
- Written by: N.K. Salil
- Screenplay by: N.K. Salil
- Produced by: Nispal Singh; Shrikant Mohta
- Starring: Koel Mallick; Soham Chakraborty; Ashish Vidyarthi; Arpit Ranka
- Cinematography: Shailesh Awasthi
- Edited by: Rabiranjan Maitra
- Music by: Jeet Gannguli
- Production companies: Surinder Films; Shree Venkatesh Films
- Distributed by: Shree Venkatesh Films
- Release date: May 25, 2012
- Country: India
- Language: Bengali

Jaaneman (transl. Sweetheart) is a 2012 Indian Bengali-language road action-adventure film directed by Raja Chanda. The film was jointly produced by Shrikant Mohta and Nispal Singh under the banner of Shree Venkatesh Films and Surinder Films respectively. It stars Koel Mallick and Soham Chakraborty in the lead roles, while Ashish Vidyarthi, Arpit Ranka (marking his debut in Bengali cinema) and Partha Sarathi Chakraborty play other pivotal roles. The story, screenplay and dialogues of the film were written by N.K Salil, while the soundtrack was composed by Jeet Gannguli. It revolves around a carefree boy Deva, who is unaware of his job, falling in love with Riya at first sight in Siliguri. On their journey to Kolkata by car, coincidentally each gets attacked by their enemies and circumstances force them to reveal each of their dark past to one other.

Jaaneman is the second Bengali film mostly shot in roads and exploring the cinematic genre of road films in Bengal after Dui Prithibi (2010). It became a blockbuster at the box office and ran more than 110 days in theatres. All the songs of the film were chartbuster upon its release and topped the music charts on the channel Sangeet Bangla.

== Cast ==
- Koel Mallick as Riya
- Soham Chakraborty as Deva
- Ashish Vidyarthi as Sridhar, underworld Don of Kolkata
- Arpit Ranka as Sridhar's henchman
- Partho Sarathi Chakraborty as Joga, a taxi driver of Kolkata, Deba's friend
- Rajat Ganguly as Ria's Uncle
- Saswati Guhathakurta as Rhea's Grandma

== Soundtrack ==
Jaaneman

Soundtrack album by Jeet Gannguli.
- Released: 25 May 2012
- Recorded: 2012
- Genre: Feature film soundtrack
- Language: Bengali
- Label: Surinder Films
- Producers: Shree Venkatesh Films, Surinder Films

Jeet Gannguli. chronology
Le Halua Le (2012)	Jaaneman (2012)	Awara (2012)

Singles from Jaaneman
- 1. "Jaaneman Title Song" Released: 22 Nov 2018; 2. "I Am In Love" Released: 22 Nov 2018; 3. "Disco Nachaibo" Released: 22 Nov 2018; 4. "Kichu Halka" Released: 22 Nov 2018

All music is composed by Jeet Gannguli.

No.	Title	Lyrics	Singer(s)	Length
1.	"I Am In Love"	Prasen (Prasenjit Mukherjee)	Jeet Gannguli	4:57
2.	"Kichu Halka"	Prasen (Prasenjit Mukherjee)	Kunal Ganjawala	4:41
3.	"Disco Nachaibo"	Raja Chanda	Jeet Gannguli	3:31
4.	"Jaaneman Title Song"	Raja Chanda	Shilpa Rao, Jeet Gannguli	4:11
5.	"Tomar Amar Prem"	Priyo Chattopadhyay	Zubeen Garg	3:39

== Reception ==
A critic from The Indian Express rated the film three out of five and wrote that "Raja Chanda had a good story going but with a focus that gets split between romance on the one hand and action on the other, after a point of time, he seems to lose control over the film, if not on the action".
