= Bor Asbe Ekhuni =

- Directed by: Rangan Chakraborty
- Produced by: Bangla Talkies
- Starring: Jisshu Sengupta; Koel Mallick; Kanchan Mullick; Mallika Mazumdar
- Music by: Jeet Gannguli; Indradeep Dasgupta
- Release date: 22 August 2008
- Language: Bengali

Bor Asbe Ekhuni (Bengali: বর আসবে এখুনি) is a 2008 Bengali film by Rangan Chakraborty. It stars Jisshu Sengupta, Koel Mallick and Kanchan Mullick. The music is by Jeet Gannguli and Indradeep Dasgupta.

== Plot ==
Mitil, a small-town girl from Siliguri decides to go to Kolkata to become a radio jockey. Her father supports her decision, but her mother opposes it and constantly asks her daughter to get married. She arrives in Kolkata and moves into a hostel for women. Over there she makes a great friend in Bibi, but at the same time she is not comfortable sharing a room with other people and decides to look for a house. She encounters the usual problem of people rejecting her for being a single woman, but a widow agrees to rent a floor to Mitil, but Mitil lied to her that she is getting married and that her would be husband would be joining her soon. So she has to find herself a fake husband to present him before the landlady.

One day Mitil and Bibi land up at a bar cum restaurant where they accidentally met two men, Avik and Kanchan. Mitil gets high on alcohol and tells Avik and Kanchan about her plan. The next day Mitil calls Avik to apologize and asks Avik if he can help her out by pretending to be her husband. Avik agrees to do so and so a fake marriage ceremony takes place with other witnesses to please the landlady. Mitil falls sick one day and Avik nurses her back to her health. Avik becomes close to Mitil, but Mitil is indifferent and feels the need to put an end to this fake drama. Mitil's parents who were unaware of everything land up unannounced at Mitil's place. Mitil tells her parents her landlady is mad and thinks she is married. In the meantime, Avik is no longer in touch with Mitil as he had been asked to leave by Mitil indirectly and her parents pressure her to get married as she is made to under stand her father has suffered a cerebral stroke. On the day of her marriage just when she is about to get married, she learns that Avik has met with an accident and she rushes to the hospital to meet him. The accident turns out to be fake as it turns out to be plan of which Mitil's father is the mastermind and the film ends on a happy note.

== Cast ==
- Jisshu Sengupta as Abhi
- Koel Mallick as Mitil
- Kanchan Mallick as Kanchan
- Mallika Mazumdar as Bibi
- Rita Koiral as Mitil's mother
- Biswajit Chakraborty Mitil's father
- Tanima Sen as Landlady
- Biswanath Basu Mitil's groom

== Music ==
Bor Asbe Ekhuni

Soundtrack album by Jeet Gannguli, Samidh-Rishi
- Released: 22 August 2008
- Recorded: 2007
- Genre: Feature film soundtrack
- Label: V.Music
- Producer: Bangla Talkies

Singles from Bor Asbe Ekhuni

Jeet Gannguli chronology
Chirodini Tumi Je Amar (2008)	Bor Asbe Ekhuni (2008)	Mon Mane Na (2008)

Indraadip Dasgupta chronology
Prohor (2008)	Bor Asbe Ekhuni (2008)	Kaler Rakhal (2009)

All lyrics are written by Saran Dutta; all music is composed by Jeet Gannguli, Indraadip Dasgupta.

No.	Title	Lyrics	Music	Singer(s)	Length
1.	"Baba Amar Ki Biye Hobe Na"		Indraadip Dasgupta	Soham Chakraborty
2.	"Som Bare Bhalobasa Chaina"		Jeet Gannguli
3.	"Dol Dol Duluni"		Jeet Gannguli
4.	"Saiyaan (Slow)"	Saran Dutta	Indraadip Dasgupta	Soham Chakraborty
5.	"Jodi Bhabo"		Jeet Gannguli
6.	"Saiyaan (Female)"	Saran Dutta	Indraadip Dasgupta
7.	"Saiyaan (Male)"	Saran Dutta	Indraadip Dasgupta	Soham Chakraborty
8.	"Jhim Jhim Nesha Nesha"		Jeet Gannguli
