= N. K. Salil =

Bengali film screenplay and story writer

N.K. Salil
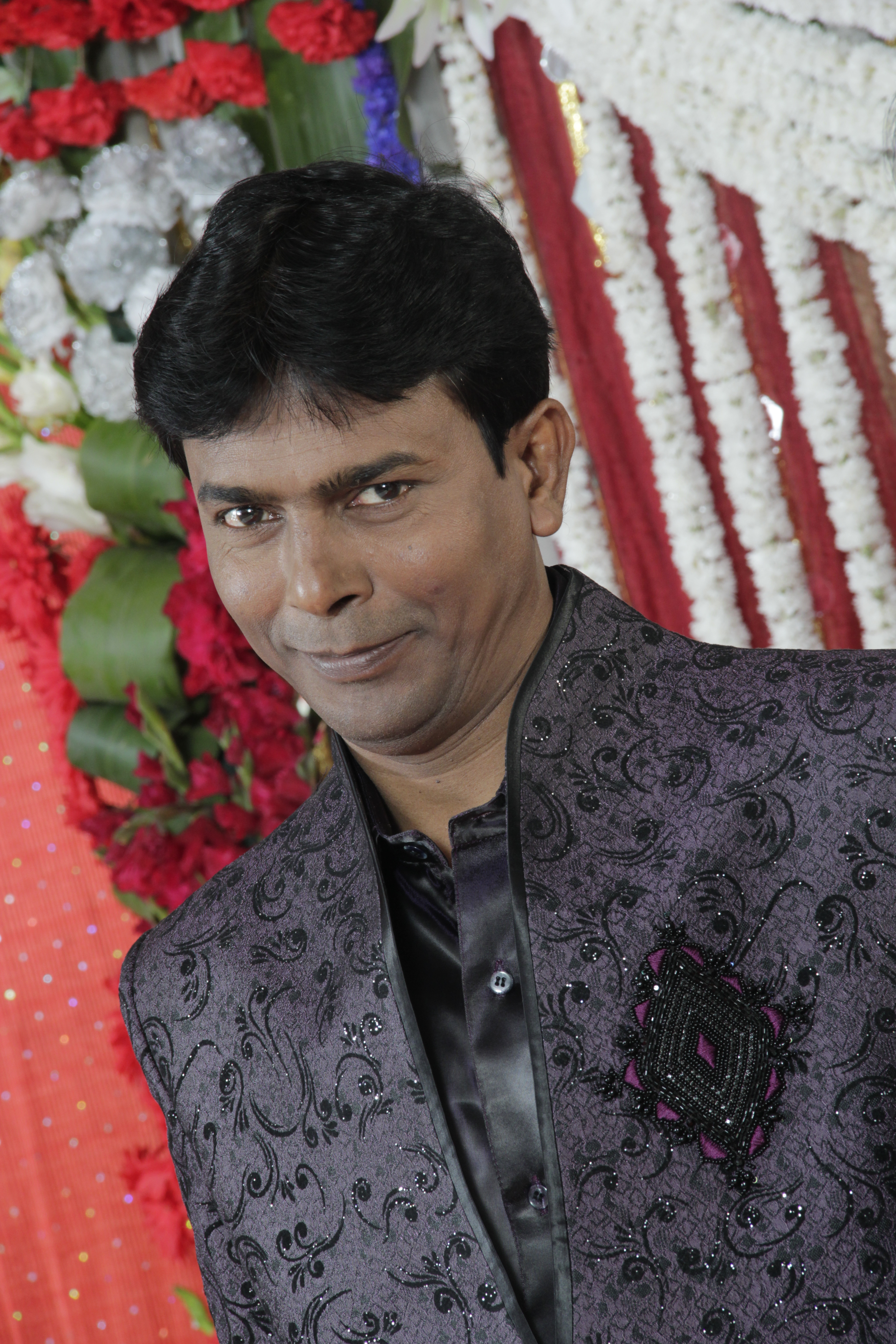
- Salil at Marriage Reception in February 2013
- Born: Salil Kumar Naskar; Howrah, West Bengal, India
- Occupation: Screenplay/story writer
- Known for: Paglu

N.K. Salil (born as Salil Kumar Naskar) is a Bengali film screenplay and story writer. He had also acted in a few movies.

== Filmography ==
Denotes films that have not yet been released

=== Story/screenplay/dialogue ===
Year	Film
1998	Aami Sei Meye
2000	Shotruta
2000	Harjeet
2001	Jamaibabu Jindabad
2002	Sonar Sansar
2002	Annadata
2002	Inquilaab
2003	Rakhe Hari Mare Ke
2004	Protishodh
2004	Barood
2004	Coolie
2004	Raja Babu
2004	Sathi Amar
2005	Devi
2005	Rajmohol
2005	Cheetah
2005	Yuddho
2006	Hungama
2006	Hero
2006	Ghatak
2006	MLA Fatakeshto
2006	Refugee
2006	Abhimanyu
2007	Tulkalam
2007	Minister Fatakeshto
2007	Mahaguru
2007	I Love You
2007	Tiger
2008	Greptar
2008	Premer Kahini
2008	Takkar
2008	Chirodini Tumi Je Amar
2008	Mon Mane Na
2008	Rajkumar
2009	Chaowa Pawa
2009	Challenge
2009	Ei Prithibi Tomar Amar
2009	Saat Paake Bandha
2009	Keno Kichu Kotha Bolo Na
2010	Bolo Na Tumi Aamar
2010	Amanush
2010	Josh
2010	Dui Prithibi
2010	Mon Je Kore Uru Uru
2010	Kellafate
2010	Shedin Dekha Hoyechilo
2011	Cholo Paltai
2011	Paglu
2011	Romeo
2012	Le Halwa Le
2012	Jaaneman
2012	Awara
2012	Paglu 2
2012	Challenge 2
2013	Deewana
2013	Loveria
2013	Rocky
2013	Boss: Born to Rule
2013	Rangbaaz
2013	Majnu
2014	Bangali Babu English Mem
2014	Arundhati
2014	Game: He Plays to Win
2014	Bindaas
2014	Bachchan
2015	Herogiri
2015	Besh Korechi Prem Korechi
2015	Parbona Ami Chartey Tokey
2016	Love Express
2016	Kelor Kirti
2016	Haripada Bandwala
2017	Ami Je Ke Tomar
2018	Total Dadagiri
2018	Girlfriend
2018	Bagh Bandi Khela
2019	Kidnap

=== Actor ===
Year	Film	Role	Notes		
2005	Yuddho	Constable Haripada			
2006	Hero	Subho's college friend			
2006	MLA Fatakeshto				
2007	Tulkalam				
2007	Minister Fatakeshto				
2008	Premer Kahini				
2008	Chirodini Tumi Je Amar				
2008	Mon Mane Na	Pickpocket			
2009	Ei Prithibi Tomar Aamar				
2009	Keno Kichu Kotha Bolo Na			2009	Olot Palot
2010	Mon Je Kore Uru Uru				
2010	Kellafate				
2015	Yennai Arindhaal		Tamil		
2016	Love Express	Bus passenger			
2017	Winner		Telugu		
2017	Ami Je Ke Tomar				
