= Woman TV =

Bengali music channel

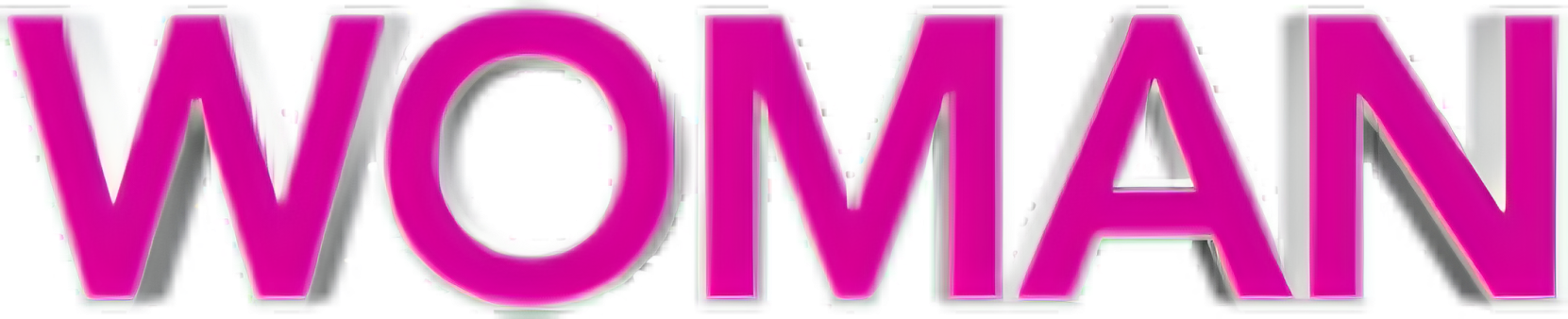
- Country: India
- Broadcast area: India
- Headquarters: Mumbai, India

Programming
- Language: English
- Picture format: 576i SDTV

Ownership
- Owner: Media Worldwide Limited
- Sister channels: Sangeet Bangla; Music India; Sangeet Bhojpuri; Sangeet Marathi

History
- Launched: March 8, 2016; 10 years ago
- Closed: 11 December 2024; 21 months ago
- Former names: Bangla Talkies (2016–2023)

Links
- Website: Official Website

Woman TV was an Indian free-to-air English-language entertainment television channel that launched on 28 July 2023, rebranded from the Bengali music channel Bangla Talkies. It was the first English entertainment channel in India to be targeted specifically at women. It was the Indian version of Woman TV, a Vietnamese television channel, launched on 8 March 2016, produced by VTVcab in cooperation with InTheBOX.TV.

Woman TV's programming included a mix of original and acquired content, including dramas, comedies, reality shows, talk shows, and lifestyle shows. The channel also aired a selection of Hollywood and Bollywood films. This channel was shut down in India from 11 December 2024.

== History ==
Bangla Talkies was launched in 2018 as a Bengali music channel. In 2023, the channel's owners decided to rebrand it as Woman TV, an English entertainment channel targeted at women. The rebranding was seen as a response to the growing demand for English-language content among Indian women.
