= Subhodrishti =

2005 Indian Bengali film by Prabhat Roy

- Theatrical release poster
- Directed by: Prabhat Roy
- Screenplay by: Prabhat Roy
- Dialogues by: Prabhat Roy
- Story by: Jashwant Gangani
- Produced by: Kamal Kumar Barjatya; Shrikant Mohta
- Starring: Jeet; Koel Mallick; Parambrata Chatterjee; Sanjib Dasgupta; Biswajit Chakraborty; Laboni Sarkar
- Cinematography: Premendu Bikash Chaki
- Edited by: Swapan Guha
- Music by: Songs: Jeet Gannguli; Background score: Debojyoti Mishra
- Production companies: Rajshri Productions; Shree Venkatesh Films
- Distributed by: Shree Venkatesh Films
- Release date: 4 November 2005
- Running time: 133 minutes
- Country: India
- Language: Bengali

Subhodrishti (Bengali pronunciation: [ʃubhodristi]; transl. The Auspicious Gaze) is a 2005 Indian Bengali-language romantic-family drama film written and directed by Prabhat Roy. Produced by Kamal Kumar Barjatya and Shrikant Mohta under the respective banners of Rajshri Productions and Shree Venkatesh Films, the film is based on a Gujarati story by Jashwant Gangani. It stars Jeet and Koel Mallick in their fifth consecutive pairing, alongside an ensemble cast of Parambrata Chatterjee, Sanjib Dasgupta, Biswajit Chakraborty, Laboni Sarkar, Rupali Bhattacharya, Ashok Bhattacharya, Alokananda Roy, Bharat Kaul, Mousumi Saha and Sanghamitra Banerjee in supporting roles. It revolves around the wedding traditions in Bengal, through the story of a married couple and the relationships between their families—who come together to face the situation when the husband is suddenly diagnosed with brain tumors due to childhood head injury.

Jeet Gannguli composed the soundtrack of the film, which consists of ten tracks, an usually large number at that time in Bengali cinema, while Debojyoti Mishra provided its score. The film marks Roy's second collaboration with both Jeet and Koel. Premendu Bikash Chaki handled its cinematography, while Swapan Guha edited the film.

Subhodrishti was theatrically released on 4 November 2005, receiving widespread acclaim both critically and commercially; critics praised the performances of Jeet and Koel as well as their chemistry, and the film's blend of simultaneously promoting strong family values and also its songs. Running for over 210 days in theatres, it emerged as the second highest-grossing Bengali film of the year.

At the 53rd National Film Awards, Subhodrishti won the Best Popular Film Providing Wholesome Entertainment. It is considered as one of the most influential films in the Bengali cinema as well as in pop culture. Attaining a cult status among the audiences, the soundtrack album of the film sold 16 million copies in West Bengal, whereas the song "Pagoley Ki Naa Bole" and "Mon Rage Anurage" topped the music charts at that time. It is also credited for lasting an impact on wedding celebrations in India, which often include songs and games from the film.

Rajshri Productions remade Subhodrishti into Hindi as Vivah (2006), with Sooraj R. Barjatya as the director, starring Shahid Kapoor and Amrita Rao in the lead.

== Plot ==
The film began with the inauguration of Annapurna Sevashram, a hospital established in memory of Annapurna by her husband. Before her death, Annapurna had urged her husband to ensure that no one in the village died due to lack of medical treatment. The responsibility of the hospital was entrusted to neurosurgeon Ramen, who was adopted by Annapurna. Arun, Annapurna's younger son who worked in agricultural research, arrived from abroad to attend the inauguration.

Within a few days, the family began searching for a bride for Varun and went to see Deepali, a prospective bride. During the visit, Deepali's younger sister Sonali disguised herself as an elderly woman and playfully questioned Varun. Arun noticed clues that exposed her disguise. Following the visit, both families agreed to the marriage between Varun and Deepali, and a wedding date was fixed soon. Deepali subsequently moved to her in-laws' house after the wedding.

During the summer holidays, Sonali and her cousin Rupa visited Deepali's marital home. Arun secretly bribed a priest to delay her return home by a week. He then played a prank on Sonali by convincing her that a scarecrow possessed divine powers. During the prank, Sonali confessed that she loved Arun. She also learned that Arun had arranged for her extended stay and became angry with him. Soon afterward, Arun collapsed due to severe headaches. Although Arun told his family that he was playing around, medical examinations after another such episode revealed that he had a brain tumour.

The news devastated both the families. Robin studied the condition extensively and also form a specialist medical board. Arun, now depressed, asked Deepali to convey his message to Sonali, urging her to forget him. Determined to remain by Arun's side, Sonali decided to complete their unfinished marriage. Despite objections from her family and Arun's father, she reached Arun's house and insisted on staying with him. Arun eventually agreed and applied sindoor to her forehead. The event renewed Arun's desire to live, but he soon suffered another collapse.

The specialists warned that surgery carried a significant risk to Arun's life. But Ramen decided to perform the operation despite the risks. While Pratima opposed the decision, Sonali expressed complete faith in Ramen and supported the surgery. As relatives from both families gathered at the hospital, Arun briefly met them before being taken into the operating theatre. The operation was successful, and Arun recovered from the danger. After Arun recovered, Arun and Sonali's wedding ceremony was rearranged and properly completed, and the film concluded with their marriage.

== Cast ==
- Jeet as Arun
- Koel Mallick as Sonali
- Parambrata Chatterjee as Ramen, Arun's younger brother
- Dilip Roy as Arun's father (voice dubbed by Arun Bannerjee)
- Biswajit Chakraborty as Arun's uncle
- Laboni Sarkar as Pratima, Arun's aunt
- Sanjib Dasgupta as Barun, Arun's elder brother
- Rupali Bhatacharya as Dipali, Sonali's elder sister and Barun's wife
- Susmit Majumder as Arun's second younger brother
- Ashok Bhattacharya as Sonali's Father
- Alokananda Roy as Sonali's mother
- Bharati Devi as Sonali's Grand-Mother
- Bharat Kaul as Dipali and Sonali's elder brother
- Mousumi Saha as Dipali and Sonali's sister-in-law
- Mimi Dutta as Rupali "Rupa", Dipali and Sonali's cousin sister
- Sanghamitra Banerjee as Sonali's paternal aunt
- Shyamal Dutta as Nagen, Dipali's paternal uncle
- Subhasish Mukherjee as Nitai Pandit
- Pradip Bhattacharya as Bhojon Thakur

== Soundtrack ==
Subhodrishti

Soundtrack album by Jeet Gannguli
- Released: 2005
- Recorded: 2005
- Genre: Feature film soundtrack
- Length: 35:52
- Language: Bengali
- Label: SVF

Jeet Gannguli chronology
Yuddho (2005)	Subhodrishti (2005)	Hero (2006)
External audio
- Subhodrishti Audio Jukebox on YouTube

Singles from Subhodrishti
- 1. "Sona Roder Hanshi Dekhe"

Jeet Gannguli composed the soundtrack of Subhodrishti in his maiden collaboration with Roy. It also marks his fourth and third collaborations with Jeet and Koel respectively, with the former after working on Premi (2004), Bandhan (2004) and Yuddho (2005), and with the latter after working on Bandhan and Yuddho. The soundtrack contains nine tracks, each penned by Priyo Chattopadhyay with the exception of the Rabindra Sangeet "Jawkhon Porbe Na Mor".

The song "Shonkho Baja Tora" briefly described the rituals of wedding in Bengali culture. Portion of its tune was referenced from Aarti Mukherjee's song "Laje Ranga Holo" from the 1969 film Parineeta, composed by Hemanta Mukherjee, also based on the same theme. Gannguli also used a tune of Anshuman Roy's famous song "Dada Paye Pori Re" in the track "Pagoley Ki Naa Bole", as a tribute to that song.

Track listing
No.	Title	Singer(s)	Length
1.	"Sona Roder Hanshi Dekhe"	Shreya Ghoshal	3:47
2.	"Gaaye Holud"	Shreya Ghoshal	3:52
3.	"Shonkho Baja Tora"	Babul Supriyo, Shreya Ghoshal	5:23
4.	"Pagoley Ki Naa Bole"	Babul Supriyo, Shreya Ghoshal	4:47
5.	"Bidhire Bidhire"	Raghab Chatterjee	2:43
6.	"Mon Rage Anurage"	Sonu Nigam, Shreya Ghoshal	3:55
7.	"Tumi Amar Chiro Sathi"	Shreya Ghoshal	3:57
8.	"Bidhire Bidhire (Sad)"	Raghab Chatterjee	2:42
9.	"Jawkhon Porbe Na Mor" (Original composition by Rabindranath Tagore)	Srikanta Acharya	4:47
Total length:			35:53

== Reception ==
Madhuparna Das of The Telegraph rated the film 6 out of 10 stars and opined "The film looks almost as rich in terms of production. Good clothes, huge mansions, lavish marriages, and a big happy family. On the whole, Subhodrishti scores well with its lively songs and a general lively feel".

== Accolades ==
Award (Note: Awards, festivals and organizations are in alphabetical order.)	Date of ceremony (Note: Date is linked to the article about the awards held that year, wherever possible.)	Category	Recipient(s)	Result	ref.
Kalakar Awards	22 January 2006	Best Rising Star	Koel Mallick	Won	
BFJA Awards	2 February 2006	Best Male Playback	Babul Supriyo	Won	
BFJA Awards	2 February 2006	Best Female Playback	Shreya Ghoshal	Won	
Anandalok Puraskar	18 November 2006	Best Director	Prabhat Roy	Won	
Anandalok Puraskar	18 November 2006	Best Upcoming Star (Female)	Koel Mallick	Won	
National Film Awards	14 September 2007	Best Popular Film Providing Wholesome Entertainment	Shrikant Mohta & Pradeep K. Barjatya	Won	
