= Mon Mane Na (2008 film) =

- Mon Mane Na Movie Poster
- Directed by: Sujit Guha
- Screenplay by: N. K. Salil
- Story by: Sujit Guha
- Produced by: Nispal Sing
- Starring: Dev; Koel Mallick; Tapas Paul; Biswajit Chakraborty
- Cinematography: Premendu Bikash Chaki
- Edited by: M. Susmit
- Music by: Songs: Jeet Gannguli; Background score: S. P. Venkatesh
- Production company: Surinder Films
- Distributed by: Shree Venkatesh Films
- Release date: 5 December 2008
- Running time: 138 minutes
- Country: India
- Language: Bengali

Mon Mane Na (Bengali pronunciation: [mɔn mane na]; transl. My Heart doesn't care) is a 2008 Indian Bengali-language romantic comedy film directed by Sujit Guha. Produced by Nispal Singh under the banner of Surinder Films, the film is an adaptation of the 1995 American film French Kiss. It stars Dev and Koel Mallick in lead roles, alongside Tapas Paul, Biswajit Chakraborty, Kaushik Banerjee and Premjit Chatterjee in supporting roles.

Written by N. K. Salil, the film revolves around Ria, who flees from her house confront her straying fiancé and gets into trouble when a suicidal-thief naming Rahul seated next to her uses her to smuggle a stolen diamond necklace, in order to save his village lands. Extensively shot in Kolkata, Darjeeling, Mumbai, Paris and Singapore, the film pairs Dev and Mallick for the second time. Jeet Gannguli composed its soundtrack, while Priyo Chattopadhyay and Gautam Sushmit penned lyrics. The cinematography and editing were handled by Premendu Bikash Chaki and M. Susmit respectively.

Mon Mane Na was theatrically released on 5 December 2008. It was a major box-office success and received critical praise. The film also ended up being the highest-grossing Bengali film of 2008. Since its release in 2008, Mon Mane Na has achieved cult status.

== Plot ==
Rahul and Ria meet as they are independently travelling. Ria is running away to meet her boyfriend, and Rahul wants to sell his loot. The destination for Rahul is Siliguri while the same for Ria is the hills of Darjeeling.

They step into each other's life as well as behind each other's backs as they travel, as Rahul hides his loot in Ria's bag. It gets into the hands of a thief. For Rahul the loot is his only hope, and that is something Ria realizes on visiting Rahul's family. Things take a turn when Ria is heartbroken, as her relationship with her boyfriend falls apart.

She offers to aid Rahul and also makes a deal with her father. As things fall into place for one, the world shatters for the other.

Rahul and Ria meet again but in different circumstances, not on Earth. They both confess their love, and get married.

== Cast ==
- Dev as Rahul
- Koel Mallick as Ria Sen
- Tapas Paul as ACP Rahman
- Biswajit Chakraborty as Ranajoy Sen, Ria's father
- Subhashish Mukherjee as Ranajoy's manager
- Bhola Tamang as Inspector Das, Rahman's assistant
- N. K. Salil as Mocktail, a pickpocket
- Kaushik Banerjee as Rahul's brother
- Mouli Bhattacharya as Chutky, Rahul's sister
- Dilip Roy as Rahul's Grandfather
- Sumit Ganguly as Sona Da
- Premjit Chatterjee as Bonnie

== Soundtrack ==
Mon Mane Na

Soundtrack album by Jeet Gannguli
- Released: 2008
- Recorded: 2008
- Studio: Surinder Films
- Genre: Feature film soundtrack
- Label: Surinder Films

Jeet Gannguli chronology
Bor Asbe Ekhuni (2008)	Mon Mane Na (2008)	Saat Paake Bandha (2009)

Singles from Mon Mane Na
- 1. "Mon Mane Na" Released: 5 December 2018; 2. "Subha Mangalam" Released: 5 December 2018; 3. "Chokhe Chokhe" Released: 6 December 2018; 4. "Sathi Bhalobasa" Released: 6 December 2018; 5. "Chupi Chupi Bhalobasa" Released: 7 December 2018

Jeet Gannguli composed the music, and Priyo Chottopadhyay and Gautam Sushmit wrote the lyrics.

No.	Title	Lyrics	Music	Singer(s)	Length
1.	"Mon Mane Na"	Priyo Chottopadhyay	Jeet Gannguli	Zubeen Garg, June Banerjee	4:20
2.	"Subha Mangalam"	Priyo Chottopadhyay	Jeet Gannguli	Zubeen Garg, Chorus	4:00
3.	"Sathi Bhalobasa"	Priyo Chottopadhyay	Jeet Gannguli	Jojo	4:07
4.	"Chokhe Chokhe"	Gautam Sushmit	Jeet Gannguli	Shaan, Shreya Ghoshal	5:20
5.	"Chupi Chupi Bhalobasa"	Gautam Sushmit	Jeet Gannguli	Shaan, June Banerjee	3:34
