= I Love You (2007 Bengali film) =

- Directed by: Ravi Kinagi
- Written by: N. K. Salil (Dialogues); Veeru Potla (story)
- Screenplay by: Ravi Kinagi
- Produced by: Shree Venkatesh Films
- Starring: Dev; Payel; Tapas Paul
- Cinematography: Premendu Bikash Chaki; K.V. Ramanna
- Edited by: Suresh Urs
- Music by: Jeet Gannguli; Devi Sri Prasad (unc.)
- Production company: Shree Venkatesh Films
- Distributed by: Shree Venkatesh Films
- Release date: 12 July 2007
- Running time: 157:37 minutes
- Country: India
- Language: Bengali

I Love You is a 2007 Indian Bengali romantic drama film by Ravi Kinagi and starring Dev, Payel and Tapas Paul. It was a Shree Venkatesh Films production. The movie is a remake of 2005 Telugu movie Nuvvostanante Nenoddantana.

== Plot ==
Rahul is a rich, city boy, born to billionaire parents and brought up in Kolkata. On the other hand, Puja is a traditional, simple desi girl, from a village of West Bengal who was brought up by her only brother, Indra. He is heartbroken when their father marries another woman and throws them out of the house, humiliating them in the process. Their mother dies, and her tomb is built on the small land which they own until the zamindar tells them that it is his land, since their mother had taken a loan from him. Indra volunteers to work day and night, to pay off the loan as long as they don't tear down his mother's tomb. The Zamindar agrees, and the local station master helps them. Slowly Indra and Puja grow up. One day, Barsha, Puja's best friend, comes to their house to invite Puja to their house as she is getting married. Barsha's elder brother Rahul also arrives on the same day from the UK, having finished his studies. Slowly Rahul and Puja fall in love but Rahul's father does not approve of it as Puja is not as rich as them, and is thus not to their standards; Rahul is also to be married to Rahul's father Shantonu Chowdhury's business partner's daughter, Mona. Shantonu Chowdhury humiliates Puja as well as Indra, who arrives a minute before, and both are thrown out of the house after Shantonu Chowdhury accuses them of trying to entice and trap Rahul. When Rahul learns of this, he goes to Puja's house and pleads to her brother to accept him. Indra gives him a chance, just like he was given a chance by the Zamindar when he was little. Rahul is tasked to take care of the cows, clean up after them and grow more crops than Indra by the end of the season; if he does not, Rahul will be thrown out of the village and can never see Puja again. A village boy who was beaten up by Indra earlier, doesn't bear it. With his goons, Mona's father, trying to get Rahul to lose the competition, making him work hard for his love, eating red chillies and rice every day, even though he can't bear it. Through many antics from the Village goons' side and Mona's side, Rahul eventually proves his love for Puja to Indra, and succeeds in growing more grains. However, the village goon kidnaps Puja and then later tries to rape her. A fight takes place in which Rahul kills the goon, Indra, after realizing that Rahul and Puja should be together, takes the blame for this and spends 5 years in prison. The movie ends with Indra's release from prison, which is also when Puja and Rahul get married, in everyone's presence. Shantonu Chowdhury is also happy to get Puja as daughter-in-law.

== Cast ==
- Dev as Rahul Chowdhury
- Payel as Pooja Chatterjee
- Tapas Paul as Indranath Chatterjee aka Indra, Pooja's elder brother
- Anshu Bach as Indra (Tapas Paul's Junior)
- Arun Bannerjee as Santanu Chowdhury, Rahul's father
- Anuradha Roy as Parvati Chowdhury, Rahul's mother
- Rajatava Dutta as SK, Mona's father
- Kamalika Banerjee as Mona's mother
- Subhasish Mukherjee as Kartik
- Paoli Dam as Barsha Chowdhury (Bhebli)
- Gita Nag as Rahul & Barsha's Grandmother
- Bharat Kaul as Village goon
- Sayantani Nandi as Mona
- Sumit Ganguly as Shambhu, caretaker of Indra's firm
- Joy Badlani as Jailor
- Debu Bose as station master

== Production ==
The film was initially titled Bhalobasha Jitbe. The rural scenes shown in this movie were filmed in the original location and set where the Telugu film was filmed at a village near Araku in Andhra Pradesh. The film was also shot in Hyderabad, Raichak, Siliguri and Dubai, which was the first Bengali film to be shot there.

== Soundtrack ==
I Love You

Soundtrack album by Jeet Gannguli
- Released: 2006
- Recorded: 2005
- Studio: Shree Venkatesh Films
- Genre: Feature film soundtrack
- Language: Bengali
- Label: SVF
- Producer: Shree Venkatesh Films

Jeet Gannguli chronology
Minister Fatakeshto (2007)	I Love You (2006)	Tiger (2007)

Singles from I Love You
- 1. "I Love You Title Track" Released: 1 Feb 2016; 2. "Bhalobasa Haat Baralo"; 3. "Mon Mane Na" Released: 19 Nov 2018; 4. "Cholre Cholre Bhai" Released: 19 Nov 2018; 5. "Dure Oi Pahar" Released: 19 Nov 2018; 6. "Ekta Kotha" Released: 19 Nov 2018

Choreography by Naidu.

All lyrics are written by Gautam Sushmit, Priyo Chattopadhyay, Chandarani Gannguli; all music is composed by Jeet Gannguli, Devi Sri Prasad.

No.	Title	Lyrics	Music	Singer(s)	Length
1.	"Mon Mane Na"	Priyo Chattopadhyay	Jeet Gannguli	Sonu Nigam	4:48
2.	"Bhalobasa Haat Baralo"	Gautam Sushmit	Jeet Gannguli	Shaan, Shreya Ghoshal	4:37
3.	"Ekta Kotha"	Priyo Chattopadhyay	Jeet Gannguli	Babul Supriyo, Shreya Ghoshal	4:57
4.	"I Love You Title Track"	Gautam Sushmit	Devi Sri Prasad, Jeet Gannguli (arranger)	Shaan, Shreya Ghoshal	6:03
5.	"Cholre Cholre Bhai"	Priyo Chattopadhyay	Jeet Gannguli	Sonu Nigam	5:13
6.	"Dure Oi Pahar"	Priyo Chattopadhyay	Jeet Gannguli	Shreya Ghoshal, Numon Pint, Sweta	4:36

== Reception ==
A critic from The Telegraph wrote that the film had "some well-conceived comic scenes".
