= Premer Kahini =

2008 Indian Bengali romantic drama film by Ravi Kinnagi

- Theatrical poster
- Directed by: Ravi Kinagi
- Screenplay by: N. K. Salil; Ravi Kinnagi
- Dialogues by: N. K. Salil
- Story by: Keshav Prasad Mishra; Ravi Kinnagi; N. K. Salil
- Produced by: Shrikant Mohta
- Starring: Dev; Koel Mallick; Ranjit Mallick; Jishu Sengupta
- Cinematography: Chota K. Naidu
- Edited by: Ravi Kinnagi
- Music by: Songs: Jeet Gannguli; Background Score: Jeet gannguli S. P. Venkatesh
- Production company: Shree Venkatesh Films
- Distributed by: Shree Venkatesh Films
- Release date: 11 April 2008
- Running time: 157 minutes
- Country: India
- Language: Bengali
- Budget: ₹ 2 crore
- Box office: ₹ 7 crore

Premer Kahini (transl. Tale of Love) is a 2008 Indian Bengali-language musical romantic drama film co-written, edited and directed by Ravi Kinnagi. Produced by Shrikant Mohta under the banner of Shree Venkatesh Films, it stars Dev, Koel Mallick and her real-life father Ranjit Mallick in lead roles, with a special appearance by Jisshu Sengupta. The film celebrates Bengali wedding traditions by means of a story of a married couple and the relationship between their families; a story about sacrificing one's love for one's family. The movie is a remake of 2006 Kannada film Mungaru Male.

The film was officially announced in September 2007 in Kolkata, and the principal photography began in November 2007. The film was shot in Kolkata, Jalpaiguri and Purulia, while a song was shot in London. Music of the film was composed by Jeet Gannguli, with lyrics penned by Priyo Chattopadhyay and Gautam Sushmit, while S. P. Venkatesh provided the background score, along with Gannguli. The screenplay and dialogues of the film were written by N. K. Salil and cinematography was handled by Chota K. Naidu. It is the third film of Dev as an actor, second collaboration between Dev and Kinnagi, and first film of Dev and Koel Mallick together.

Premer Kahini was theatrically released on 11 April 2008, with highly positive reviews. Running for over 140 days in theatres, it was a blockbuster at the box office. Made on a budget of ₹2 crore (US$210,000), it grossed ₹7 crore (US$730,000) at the box office and emerged as the third highest grossing Bengali film of 2008. All the songs of the film were chartbuster upon its release, especially "Rimjhim E Dharate" sung by Shaan and Shreya Ghoshal topped the music charts.

== Plot ==
Akash and Barsha met by accident at Metropolish Fame Mall. Akash fell in love with Barsha instantly. However, he lost contact with her and could not track her address by any means. As he was visiting a marriage ceremony of the daughter of his mom's friend, to his surprise, he found the bride was Barsha herself. In the end, Akash marries Barsha indicating a happily ever after result of their love story.

== Cast ==
- Dev as Akash
- Koel Mallick as Barsha
- Ranjit Mallick as Colonel Sinha, Barsha's Father
- Moushumi Saha as Sunanda Roy, Akash's Mother
- Kalyani Mandal as Indrani Sinha, Barsha's Mother
- Diganta Bagchi as Bobby, Barsha's one sided lover
- Shyamal Dutta as Akash's Father
- Rajanya Mitra
- Jisshu Sengupta as Major Gautam, Barsha's Fiancé (Cameo Appearance)

== Soundtrack ==
The music of Premer Kahini is composed by Jeet Gannguli and the lyrics are written by Priyo Chattopadhyay and Gautam Sushmit. The soundtrack was released in India on 15 August 2008. Media partner of Premer Kahini is Bengali Music Channel Sangeet Bangla. The soundtrack 'Tumi Chara' is a Bengali version of the song 'Quit Playing Games With My Heart' by American boy band Backstreet Boys.

Premer Kahini

Studio album by Jeet Gannguli
- Released: 15 August 2008 (CD release)
- Genre: Feature film soundtrack
- Label: SVF

Jeet Gannguli chronology
Lal Kalo (2008)	Premer Kahini (2008)	Love (2008)

Singles from Premer Kahini
- 1. "Rimjhim E Dhara Te" Released: 21 Jun 2014; 2. "Tumi Chara" Released: 15 Feb 2016; 3. "O My Love" Released: 16 Feb 2016; 4. "Rimjhim A Dharatey Sad Version" Released: 17 Feb 2016; 5. "Aaj Swapno Sukher" Released: 22 May 2016; 6. "Sanai Baje" Released: 24 Dec 2018

No	Song	Singer(s)	Lyrics	Duration
1	"Aaj Swopno Sukher"	Babul Supriyo, Mahalaxmi Iyer	Priyo Chattopadhyay	4:16
2	"O My Love"	Shaan	Gautam Sushmit	4:10
3	"Premer Kahini"	Shaan		
4	"Premer Kahini"	Shreya Ghoshal		
5	"Sanai Baje"	Shreya Ghoshal	Priyo Chattopadhyay	4:30
6	"Shongshar Sukher Hoi"	Shreya Ghoshal, Babul Supriyo	Priyo Chattopadhyay	4:45
7	"Tumi Chara"	Shaan, Shreya Ghoshal	Priyo Chattopadhyay	3:28
8	"Rimjhim E Dhara Te"	Shaan	Priyo Chattopadhyay	4:55
9	"Rimjhim A Dharatey" (Sad Version)	Shreya Ghoshal	Priyo Chattopadhyay	2:30

== Critical reception ==
The Telegraph wrote that "Just as you had desperately wanted Raj to end up with Simran in Dilwale Dulhaniya Le Jayenge, you almost will best man Akash on to win Barsha's hand in Premer Kahini. Though it has several flashes of the Shah Rukh-Kajol-starrer, director Ravi Kinnagi adds novelty to the script and makes Premer Kahini an engaging watch".
