= Yuddho =

2005 Indian action thriller film

- Official poster
- Directed by: Rabi Kinagi
- Screenplay by: N.K. Salil; Ravi Kinagi (story)
- Produced by: Shree Venkatesh Films
- Starring: Mithun Chakraborty; Debashree Roy; Jeet; Koel; Kaushik Banerjee; Bharat Kaul; Rajatava Dutta
- Cinematography: K V RAMANNA
- Edited by: Suresh Urs
- Music by: Jeet Gannguli
- Release date: 29 July 2005
- Running time: 166 mins
- Country: India
- Language: Bengali
- Budget: ₹ 1.5 crore
- Box office: ₹ 3.5 crore

Yuddho (or Juddho; English: War) is a 2005 Indian Bengali-language action thriller film written and directed by Ravi Kinnagi. Produced by Shrikant Mohta under the banner of Shree Venkatesh Films, it stars Mithun Chakraborty, Jeet (for the first time together), Debashree Roy, Koel Mallick, Rajatava Dutta, Bharat Kaul and Kaushik Banerjee. The story revolves around a police officer who is falsely accused of murdering his wife and imprisoned as he has been investigating a rape case that involves the younger brother of a powerful MLA. The officer then manages to evade the prison and get his revenge.

The screenplay and dialogue of the film were written by N. K. Salil. The music of the film was composed by Jeet Gannguli, with the action sequences by Judo Ramu. It was an all-time blockbuster at the box office with a long run consisting of 180 days in the theatres and also became the highest-grossing Bengali film of 2005. The film was dubbed in Odia and released in Odisha, which was also successful.

Massively, Yuddho got positive reviews from the critics and audiences. Choreography of the car and bike chasing sequences was praised by the critics, with performances by the entire cast particularly the electrifying chemistry among Mithun Chakraborty, Jeet and Rajatava Dutta. After the broadcast of Sangeet Bangla, all the songs of the film aired on it and became chartbusters breaking all records during its release.

== Plot ==
DSP Agnishwar Ray, a stone hearted and honest police officer who is very loyal to his duty, is called the 'Baap (father) of all the criminals'. According to his theory, he always gives a every criminal a chance of redemption. On any additional meetings, the criminal goes to hospital or morgue. His aggressive approach keeps him being transferred to other stations. His 25th transfer is to Uttarpara police station. His wife, Sandhya Roy, is pleased with their relationship and does not attribute an angry nature to Agnishwar's behavior.

In the Keyatola area of Uttarpara, there lives a good-hearted local vagabond gangster named Surya Sinha. Other goons and the police avoid him intensely. Agnishwar confronts Surya at the police station about being agoon and Surya warns Agnishwar that if he enters Keyatola there will be trouble. Agnishwar is in Keyatola and they fight but he cannot be arrested because Agnishwar must go to his ill wife.

Meena, the daughter of the reputed teacher of the locality Master Moshai, has been brutally gang-raped, and left to die, after attending with friend Barsha a college function. Ranjit Saha, the younger brother of the local MLA named Joy Chand Saha, abducts Meena and Barsha, the latter escapes. Surya learns of the assault by Ranjit on Meena and attacks Ranjit at his home. Ranjit's bodyguards call the police and Surya is detained.

Agnishwar learns from Surya why Ranjit was attacked. Ranjit is arrested and Barsha agrees to give evidence in court. MLA Saha seeks revenge by having the henchman Kallu kill Agnishwar's pregnant wife Sandhya while marketing. Kallu attacks her, but the attempt to kill her is thwarted when Surya sees Sandhya attacked. Agnishwar is thankful to Surya and comes to learn that Surya wants to be a police officer but for the circumstances that made him a goon.

The MLA gets Agnishwar put in prison and his wife Sandhya murdered. Agnishwar starts his revenge; he slowly kills all the persons responsible for putting him behind bars and the attempted killing of his wife, ending with the death of the MLA and himself at the hands of Surya, who has by now become a police officer.

== Cast ==
- Mithun Chakraborty as DSP Agnishwar Roy
- Jeet as Surya Sinha, A local gangster from Keyatola turned Sub-inspector
- Debashree Roy as Sandhya Roy
- Koel as Barsha Sinha
- Rajatava Dutta as Joy Chand Saha, MLA of Uttarpara
- Kaushik Banerjee as Deepak Ghoshal, Agnishwar Roy's junior in the department
- Bharat Kaul as Ranjit Saha, Joy Chanda Saha's younger brother
- Sumit Ganguly as Kaalu, Joy Chand Saha's henchman
- N.K. Salil as constable Haripada
- Ashok Mukherjee as DG Uttam Dutta
- Sanjib Dasgupta as DSP Arun Pradhan
- Mrityun Hazra as Ratan Basak

== Soundtrack ==
Yuddho

Soundtrack album by Jeet Gannguli
- Released: 2004
- Recorded: 2003
- Studio: Shree Venkatesh Films
- Genre: Feature film soundtrack
- Language: Bengali
- Label: SVF

Jeet Gannguli chronology
Bandhan (2004)	Yuddho (2004)	Shubhodrishti (2005)

Singles from Yuddho
- 1. "Kichu Aasha Khonje Bhasha" Released: 29 November 2017; 2. "Tomar O Chokhete" Released: 28 December 2018; 3. "Baisakhete Pratham Dekha" Released: 28 December 2018

All lyrics are written by Gautam Susmit, Priyo Chattopadhyay; all music is composed by Jeet Gannguli.

Track listing
No.	Title	Singer(s)	Length
1.	"Kichu Aasha Khonje Bhasha"	Sonu Nigam, Shreya Ghoshal	4:54
2.	"Baisakhete Pratham Dekha"	Sonu Nigam, Shreya Ghoshal	4:19
3.	"Tomar O Chokhete"	Babul Supriyo, Sadhna Sargam	4:30
4.	"Shure Shure"	Babul Supriyo, Jeet Gannguli, Shreya Ghoshal, Sonu Nigam, Sadhna Sargam	4:46
5.	"Sadher Lau"	Miss. Jojo, Jeet Gannguli	5:01

== Production ==
Initially, the role of Mrs. Sandhya Roy was offered to Rachna Banerjee and then to Rituparna Sengupta. After both of them refused to play the role, it was offered to Debashree Roy.
