= Minister Fatakeshto =

2007 Indian Bengali film by Swapan Saha

- Directed by: Swapan Saha
- Written by: N. K. Salil
- Starring: Mithun Chakraborty; Deepankar De; Koel Mallick; Soumitra Chatterjee; George Baker; Shankar Chakraborty; Locket Chatterjee; Kaushik Banerjee; Dulal Lahiri
- Edited by: Suresh Urs
- Music by: Jeet Gannguli
- Release date: 8 June 2007
- Running time: 153 minutes
- Country: India
- Language: Bengali

Minister Fatakeshto is a 2007 Bengali language political action thriller film directed by Swapan Saha and produced by Shree Venkatesh Films. It is the sequel to MLA Fatakeshto (2006), and the second installment of the Fatakeshto series. The film stars Mithun Chakraborty, Koel Mallick, and Soumitra Chatterjee reprising their roles from the previous film with George Baker, Deepankar De, Shankar Chakraborty and Locket Chatterjee playing pivotal roles. The story, screenplay and the dialogues were written by N.K Salil, with soundtrack composed by Jeet Gannguli and action sequences designed by Judo Ramu. The film was a super-hit in the box office.

The film received mixed reviews from the critics. The critics praised the performances of Chakraborty, Koel Mallick and Chatterjee, dialogues written by N.K Salil, the music by Jeet Gannguli, the cinematography, but criticized the plot, the political portrayal and particularly the climax action sequence.

The song ''Ami Minister Fatakeshto'' was sung by Mithun Chakraborty himself, which topped the music charts on Sangeet Bangla. It was one of the highest grossing Bengali films of 2007. It and its prequel are inspired from the Bollywood movie Nayak: The Real Hero.

== Plot ==
The film continues after the events of MLA Fatakeshto. MLA turned Home Minister, Fatakeshto (Mithun Chakraborty) calls for discipline and a pro-people attitude, although he has a few co-ministers against him. With his usual dialogue, "Marbo ekhaney, Lash porbe soshane" (I shall hit you here, but your body will fall at the crematorium), he bashes the goons right, left, and middle. Chaitali, a lady reporter, is now reporting everything in "Star Ananda", a TV channel run by The Telegraph.

However, the Chief Minister (Soumitra Chatterjee) is in favor of Fatakeshto. With a 4000 crores loss in the Finance Department, Fatakeshto vows to take the Finance Ministry and recover the loss in seven days. The Chief Minister also bestows the duty on Fatakeshto of removing the FM (one of the goons). With many hurdles on the way, Fatakeshto recovers almost Rs. 3700 crores loss by booking ministers for their misappropriation of funds, but is left short of 300 crores.

In the meantime, the arch-villain calls all his group and plans to finish Fatakeshto. Further, he also calls for 48 Hours strike ("Bangla Bandh"), which Fatakeshto stops with his muscles. The villain then mixes dangerous germs in mineral water bottles, which kills around 50 children in Bengal. This forces Fatakeshto to bow down in front of the villain and request the life-saving medicine lying with him to save the suffering children. With someone reporting the mineral water mischief, Fatakeshto gets the arch-villain arrested for the crime soon.

In the showdown, the remaining 300 crores are being collected through public donations dropped in big mud hundies (Lakshmi Bhar). The villain comes out of jail on bail, loots the booty, and takes it to an unknown destination to make Fatakehto responsible for the theft. One of the ministers who was with the villain somehow changes his mind and informs Fatakeshto of the location where the booty is hidden. CM requests him to go back to his role of hooliganism to recover people's money. Finally, Fatakeshto jumps into the den of the villains and fights around 200 to 300 karate masters. He finally kills the villain and captures the booty. The lost money is returned to the Chief Minister.

== Cast ==
- Mithun Chakraborty as MLA turned Home Minister Krishna Dev Chatterjee aka Fatakeshto, who later becomes the Finance Minister
- Koel Mallick as Chaitali Roy (News Reporter of Star Ananda)
- Soumitra Chatterjee as Chief minister of West Bengal, who dreams of Sonar Bangla
- George Baker as Raj Burman, a ruthless businessman, Ranadeb Pal's close ally
- Deepankar De as Finance minister Barun Mishra
- Shankar Chakraborty as Advocate Biswanath Basak
- Locket Chatterjee as Economist Manashi Mukherjee
- Kaushik Banerjee as DCP of West Bengal Police
- Dulal Lahiri as Pratap Nandi, Health Minister
- Sumit Ganguly as Monotosh Panja, a local goon[Cameo appearance]
- N.K Salil as Local Coconut Seller.
- Arindol Bagchi as Radhamohan Sarkar, A Kerosene dealer.
- Suman De as Suman[News Reporter of Star Ananda][Cameo appearance]

== Production ==
=== Announcement ===
Following the success of MLA Fatakeshto(2006), SVF announced the sequel of it. N.K Salil started working on the project. Mithun Chakraborty and Koel Mallick were signed to do the film. Soumitra Chatterjee also nodded to reprise his role of the CM. Deepankar De, George Baker, Kaushik Banerjee and Dulal Lahiri were roped to play the antagonists. Shankar Chakraborty and Locket Chatterjee came on the board for another important roles.

== Soundtrack ==
Minister Fatakeshto

Soundtrack album by Jeet Gannguli
- Released: 2007
- Recorded: 2006
- Studio: Shree Venkatesh Films
- Genre: Film soundtrack
- Language: Bengali
- Label: SVF

Jeet Gannguli chronology
Nabab Nandini (2007)	Minister Fatakeshto (2007)	I Love You (2007)

Singles from Minister Fatakeshto
- 1. "Aami Minister Fatakesto" Released: 6 Jul 2007; 2. "Dhukupuku Buk" Released: 7 Jul 2007; 3. "Vandemataram" Released: 12 Jul 2007

All lyrics are written by Priyo Chattopadhyay; all music is composed by Jeet Gannguli.

No.	Title	Singer(s)	Length
1.	"Dhukupuku Buk"	Kalpana Patowary	4:39
2.	"Vandemataram"	Kunal Ganjawala, Jeet Gannguli, Pamela Jain	4:07
3.	"Aami Minister Fatakesto"	Mithun Chakraborty	4:43

== Awards ==
Year	Title	Award	Awardee	Result
	Anandalok Awards	Best Film	Minister Fatakeshto	Won
	Anandalok Awards	Best Actor	Mithun Chakraborty	Won

== Box office ==
Made at the budget of 2.50 crores, the film was released with 50 prints and collected over 2.85 crores while crossing 50 days.
