= Eri Naam Prem =

- Theatrical release poster
- Directed by: Sujit Guha
- Produced by: Naresh Kumar Jain
- Starring: Koel Mallick; Anubhav Mohanty
- Music by: Jeet Gannguli
- Production company: Eskay Movies
- Release date: 6 July 2006
- Country: India
- Language: Bengali
- Box office: 40 lakh

Eri Naam Prem is a 2006 romantic Bengali film directed by Sujit Guha and produced by Naresh Kumar Jain under the banner of Eskay Movies. The film features actors Koel Mallick and Anubhav Mohanty in the lead roles. Music of the film has been composed by Jeet Ganguly.

== Cast ==
- Koel Mallick as Rina
- Anubhav Mohanty as Akash
- Mrinal Mukherjee
- Soma Dey
- Abdur Razzak
- Kaushik Banerjee
- Subhasish Mukhopadhyay
- Dola Chowdhury
- Premjit Mukherjee
- Raja Chattopadhyay

== Soundtrack ==
Eri Naam Prem

Soundtrack album by Jeet Gannguli
- Released: 2006
- Genre: Feature film soundtrack
- Length: 18:02

Jeet Gannguli chronology
Ghatak (2006)	Eri Naam Prem (2006)	Tiger (2007)

All music is composed by Jeet Gannguli.

No.	Title	Singer(s)	Length
1.	"Bhalobashar Ei Jibon"	Shreya Ghoshal, Soham Chakraborty	5:07
2.	"Ei Prem"	Shaan	4:37
3.	"Tomake Kotha Dilam"	Babul Supriyo, Shreya Ghoshal	4:39
4.	"Tor Pirite"	Abhijit Bhattacharya, Miss Jojo	3:39
5.	"I Love You"	Sonu Nigam	5:04
Total length:			23:06

== See also ==
- List of Bengali films of 2006
