= Bandhan (2004 film) =

- Film poster
- Directed by: Rabi Kinagi
- Written by: Rabi Kinagi
- Produced by: Shree Venkatesh Films
- Starring: Jeet; Koel; Victor Banerjee; Oindrila Sen
- Edited by: Suresh Urs
- Music by: Jeet Gannguli
- Release date: 17 December 2004
- Running time: 167 minutes
- Country: India
- Language: Bengali

Bandhan (transl. Bond) is a 2004 Indian Bengali language romantic family drama film co-written and directed by Rabi Kinnagi. Produced by Shrikant Mohta and Mahendra Soni under the banner of Shree Venkatesh Films, it stars Jeet, Koel (in a dual role) and Victor Banerjee in the lead roles. Loosely a remake of the Telugu film Santosham (2002), the film centres on Rohit and his son, Rony, who travel to India years after his mother, Mina's death to reconnect with the estranged family during a wedding celebration. Rony mistakes Mina's identical twin sister, Rina, for his mother, bringing the family closer. The film explores love, loss, reconciliation, and second chances.

The soundtrack of the film was composed by Jeet Gannguli. All the songs of the film, particularly 'Shey Chhilo Boroi Anmona', sung by Shaan and 'Je Kothati Mone', sung by Shreya Ghoshal and Sonu Nigam became chartbusters upon its release.

Bandhan is the 3rd film of the super hit pair, Jeet and Koel together. It also marks the 4th collaboration between Jeet and Rabi Kinagi. It was an all-time blockbuster at the box office and ran more than 200 days in theatres, becoming the highest grossing Bengali film of 2004.

== Plot ==
Mina, the cherished daughter of the affluent Choudhury family, falls in love with Rohit Banerjee while studying in Singapore and marries him against the wishes of her strict and authoritative father, Pratap Narayan Chowdhury, who had already arranged her marriage elsewhere. Enraged by her defiance, Pratap completely cuts ties with Mina, leading to her estrangement from her wealthy joint family in India. Rohit and Mina settle in Singapore and have a son, Rony. Tragically, Mina later dies due to childbirth complications, leaving behind a final wish that her son should know his maternal family and that Rohit reconcile with her parents.

Years later, the opportunity for reconciliation arises when Mina’s cousin Chumki is set to be married in India. Mina’s warm-hearted mother, Sabitri Devi, insists that Rohit and Rony be invited to the wedding, believing it is what Mina would have wanted. Despite Pratap Narayan’s vehement opposition, Sabitri Devi stands her ground, even threatening a hunger strike, and ultimately succeeds in inviting them.

Rohit and Rony travel to India and are warmly welcomed by most of the family. However, Pratap Narayan and his short-tempered son, Pradeep, greet them with hostility and subject Rohit to constant humiliation. Despite the cold reception, Rohit remains patient, respectful, and dignified, determined to honour Mina’s memory and secure acceptance for Rony. He gently explains to his son why they remain unwelcome, teaching him patience and grace in the face of rejection. Gradually, Rony’s innocence and Rohit’s kindness begin to soften the family’s resentment. During a family prayer, Rony impresses Pratap with the traditional values and religious hymns Rohit has taught him, slowly earning Rohit and Rony acceptance within the household.

A major turning point comes with the arrival of Mina’s identical twin sister, Rina. Young Rony immediately mistakes Rina for Mina and begins treating her as a surrogate mother figure. To shield the child from grief, Rina affectionately embraces the role. As they bond over their shared love and grief for Mina, Rohit and Rina gradually develop deep, unspoken feelings for one another. Slowly, even the stubborn Pratap begins to soften and starts accepting Rohit as his son-in-law.

Complications arise when Pratap fixes Rina’s marriage with Vijay, the son of a family friend. Heartbroken and having developed genuine feelings for Rohit, Rina refuses the match and confesses her love in a letter, insisting she cannot live without him. Rohit, haunted by the consequences of his marriage with Mina and unwilling to cause another rift in the family, refuses to encourage her feelings and urges her to obey her father’s wishes.

However, when Rina’s private letter falls into Pratap Narayan’s hands, he misunderstands the situation, believing Rohit is once again disrupting his family. Enraged, Pratap revives his old bitterness and drives Rohit and Rony out of the house. As Rohit and Rony leave for the railway station to return to Singapore, the truth is finally revealed at home. Rina and the rest of the family confront Pratap, making him realize Rohit’s innocence, dignity, and selflessness in protecting the family’s honour.

Overcome with guilt and finally confronting the pain caused by his rigidity and pride, Pratap rushes to the railway station to stop Rohit. He reconciles with him, accepts Rony as his grandson, and welcomes Rohit back into the family. The story ends on an emotional note of healing and reconciliation, with the hope of a future together for Rohit and Rina, while Mina’s memory ultimately helps restore the broken bonds within the family.

== Cast ==
- Jeet as Rohit Banerjee
- Koel in dual roles— Mina and her sister Rina
- Victor Banerjee as Pratap Narayan Chowdhury, Mina & Rina's Father
- Shantilal Mukherjee as Priyo Da, Rohit's friend
- Raja Chattopadhyay as Pradip Chowdhury, Mina and Rina's elder brother
- Locket Chatterjee as Pradip's wife
- Biswajit Chakraborty as Dr. Ghoshal
- Oindrila Sen as Rony's Maternal Cousin
- Sumanta Mukherjee as Aditya Narayan Chowdhury, Mina & Rina's Uncle
- Soma Dey as Mina & Rina's Mother
- Santana Bose
- Master Angshu as Rony
- Ravishankar Pande
- Sonali Chakraborty as Mina and Rina's paternal aunt

== Crew ==
- Producer: Shree Venkatesh Films
- Director: Rabi Kinagi
- Story: Rabi Kinagi
- Dialogue: Priyo Chattopadhyay
- Lyrics: Gautam Susmit
- Music: Jeet Ganguly
- Editing: Suresh Urs
- Cinematography: Rajan Kinagi
- Singer: Sonu Nigam, Shreya Ghoshal, Shaan, Sadhana Sargam, Raghab Chatterjee

== Soundtrack ==
Bandhan

Soundtrack album by Jeet Gannguli
- Released: 2004
- Recorded: 2004
- Studio: Shree Venkatesh Films
- Genre: Feature film soundtrack
- Language: Bengali
- Label: SVF

Jeet Gannguli chronology
Premi (2004)	Bandhan (2004)	Yuddho (2005)

Singles from Bandhan
- 1. "Shey Chilo Boroi Anmona" Released: 29 November 2017; 2. "Kichu Hashi Kichu Asha" Released: 30 November 2018; 3. "Tokey Niye Banchbo Aami" Released: 30 November 2018; 4. "Je Kathati Mone" Released: 30 November 2018; 5. "Aaj Tomay Niye Suru Holo" Released: 30 November 2018; 6. "Bose Bose Bhabi" Released: 30 November 2018

All lyrics are written by Gautam Sushmit; all music is composed by Jeet Gannguli.

Track listing
No.	Title	Singer(s)	Length
1.	"Aaj Tomay Niye Suru Holo"	Sonu Nigam & Sadhana Sargam	5:55
2.	"Je Kathati Mone"	Sonu Nigam & Shreya Ghoshal	4:47
3.	"Kichu Hashi Kichu Asha"	Sonu Nigam	4:25
4.	"Shey Chilo Boroi Anmona"	Shaan	4:42
5.	"Bose Bose Bhabi"	Raghab Chatterjee & Shreya Ghoshal	4:15
6.	"Tokey Niye Banchbo Aami"	Sonu Nigam	5:38
