= MLA Fatakeshto =

- Poster
- Directed by: Swapan Saha
- Screenplay by: N.K. Salil
- Story by: N. K. Salil
- Starring: Mithun Chakraborty; Koel Mallick; Debashree Roy; Soumitra Chatterjee; Rajatava Dutta
- Edited by: Suresh Urs
- Music by: Jeet Gannguli
- Release date: 14 April 2006 (India)
- Running time: 160 minutes
- Country: India
- Language: Bengali
- Budget: ₹ 2 crores
- Box office: ₹ 7.50 crores

MLA Fatakeshto is a 2006 Indian Bengali language political action film directed by Swapan Saha and produced by Shree Venkatesh Films. The film stars Mithun Chakraborty in the titular role alongside Debashree Roy, Rajatava Dutta, Soumitra Chatterjee, Koel Mallick and Shantilal Mukherjee in supporting roles. This film is famous for its screenplay and dialogues written by N.K Salil, songs composed by Jeet Gannguli and action sequences designed by Judo Ramu. It was declared to be an all-time blockbuster at the box office, helped by the 2006 West Bengal Legislative Assembly election.

The film received generally positive reviews upon its release. Critics were particularly appreciative of the political issues and portrayal in the film, catchy dialogues, the performances of Mithun Chakraborty, Koel Mallick, Rajatava Dutta, the music, and the slick action sequences. MLA Fatakeshto emerged as the highest grossing Bengali film of 2006. It won Anandalok Awards for the best Villain. MLA Fatakeshto was followed by Minister Fatakeshto, which released in 2007.

It has gained fame for its dialogues such as "Saala Marbo ekhaney, lash porbe sashane"(Here by me you will be hit and in the cremation ground your body will be fit) and "Fatakeshto khobor dekhe na, khobor pore na, khobor toiri kore" (Neither Fatakeshto watches news, nor reads, he makes news). The film collected ₹7.5 crore at the Box Office. It is inspired from the Bollywood movie Nayak: The Real Hero.

== Plot ==
It is the tale of seven days of a small time goon who becomes an M.L.A.

== Cast ==
- Mithun Chakraborty as Krishna Dev Chatterjee aka "Fatakeshto"; a local goon who initially worked for Home Minister Ranadeb Pal and later becomes the Home Minister with the help of the CM
- Koel Mallick as Chaitali Roy, news reporter of 'Khobor Kolkata'
- Soumitra Chatterjee as the Chief Minister
- Debashree Roy as Nandini Chatterjee, Fatakeshto's wife
- Rajatava Dutta as the Home Minister Ranadeb Pal
- Shantilal Mukhopadhyay as Haridas Pal, Ranadeb's PA
- Bharat Kaul as DSP Durjoy Naag
- Sanjib Dasgupta as Atim Ghosh, leader of the Opposition
- Sumit Ganguly as Ratan Basak, Ranadeb's henchman
- Shyamal Dutta as chief editor of Khabor Kolkata
- Anshu Bach as Sahed Chatterjee; Krishna's "Fatakeshto" and Nandini's Son
- N.K Salil as Traffic Constable

== Soundtrack ==
MLA Fatakeshto

Soundtrack album by Jeet Gannguli
- Released: 2006
- Recorded: 2005
- Studio: Shree Venkatesh Films
- Genre: Feature film soundtrack
- Language: Bengali
- Label: SVF

Jeet Gannguli chronology
| Priyotoma (2006) | MLA Fatakeshto (2006) | Refugee (2006) |

Singles from MLA Fatakeshto
- 1. "Ami MLA Fatakeshto" Released: 7 Feb 2019; 2. "Bibi Asol Hero" Released: 7 Feb 2019; 3. "Khusir Aalo" Released: 7 Feb 2019

All lyrics are written by Gautam Sushmit; all music is composed by Jeet Gannguli.

| No. | Title | Singer(s) | Length |
|---|---|---|---|
| 1. | "Bibi Asol Hero" | Amit Kumar | 2:42 |
| 2. | "Ami MLA Fatakeshto" | Amit Kumar | 4:58 |
| 3. | "Khusir Aalo" | Amit Kumar, Pamela Jain | 5:19 |
| 4. | "MLA Fatakesto (Theme Song)" | Chaturvedi, Jeet Gannguli |

== Reception ==
=== Box office ===
Made at the budget of ₹ 2 crore, the film was released with 61 prints and collected over ₹ 7.50 crore in 75 days.

== Awards ==
| Award | Category | Recipient and Nominees | Result |
|---|---|---|---|
| Anandalok Awards | Best Villain | Rajatava Dutta | Won |
