= Koel Mallick =

Indian actress and politician

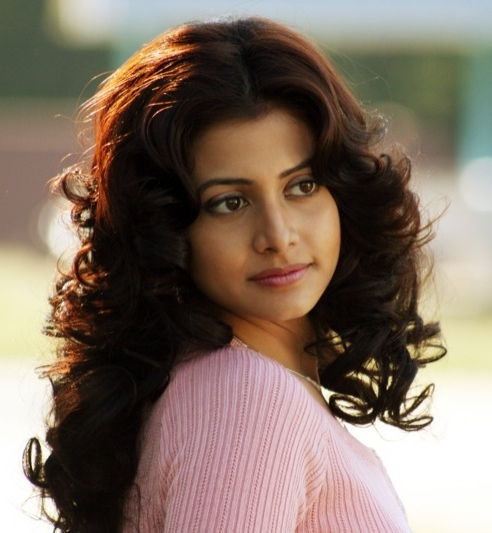
- Koel Mallick in 2007

Member of Parliament, Rajya Sabha
- Incumbent
- Assumed office 10 October 2026
- Preceded by: Herself
- Constituency: West Bengal
- In office 3 April 2026 – 16 July 2026
- Preceded by: Ritabrata Banerjee
- Succeeded by: Herself

Personal details
- Born: Rukmini Mallick; 28 April 1982 (age 44) Kolkata, West Bengal, India
- Party: Bharatiya Janata Party (2026–present)
- Other political affiliations: Trinamool Congress (2026)
- Spouse: Nispal Singh (m. 2013)
- Children: 2
- Parent: Ranjit Mallick (father)
- Education: Gokhale Memorial Girls' College
- Occupation: Actress; Politician
- Nickname(s): Koel, Koel Mallick Singh

Rukmini Mallick, (born on 28 April 1982) known professionally as Koel Mallick, or mononymously as Koel, is an Indian actress, politician and a member of Rajya Sabha from West Bengal, known for her work primarily in Bengali films. Often referred to as the "Tolly-Queen", she is the recipient numerous accolades, including a Filmfare Awards Bangla, two BFJA Awards, and a Anandalok Puraskar. In 2023, she was honoured with the Mahanayak Samman by the Government of West Bengal.

The daughter of Ranjit Mallick, Koel made her acting debut with Nater Guru (2003), which was a box-office success. She rose to fame starring in commercially successful films Shubhodrishti (2005), Mon Mane Na (2008), Premer Kahini (2008), 100% Love (2012) and Rangbaaz (2013). Starring roles in the top-grossing romances Paglu (2011) and Besh Korechi Prem Korechi (2015), established her as a leading star in Bengali cinema. Her performances in the family drama Bandhan (2004), the political thriller MLA Fatakeshto (2006), the drama Dui Prithibi (2010), the black comedy Hemlock Society (2012), the thriller Mitin Mashi (2019) received critical acclaim.

In addition to acting in films, Koel is a social activist and noted for her work with widows and children. Koel has been married to the producer Nispal Singh since 2013, with whom she has two children.

== Early life and education ==
Mallick was born in Kolkata to Bengali film actor Ranjit Mallick and Deepa Mallick, of Kolkata's Mallick Bari of Bhowanipore. Mallick did her schooling at Modern High School for Girls, and completed a BSc (honors) in Psychology from the Gokhale Memorial Girls' College, an affiliated college of the University of Calcutta.

== Career ==
=== Film ===
Mallick's screen debut was in Nater Guru – opposite Jeet. Nater Guru was a "runaway success" at the box office. The film, released in 2003, marked Mallick's entry into Tollywood. She also won her first award for Best Actor in a Leading Role Female at the 4th Tele Cine Awards (2004) for Nater Guru. In the film, Mallick plays the role of a 23-year-old girl named Monica opposite Jeet. Since the release of Nater Guru the pair has worked together often, appearing in eleven films.

In 2004, she starred in Debipaksha, Shudhu Tumi, Badsha The King and Bandhan. While the first two performed poorly at the box office, Bandhan was a huge success in Bengal and was a blockbuster at the box office. It was also the highest grossing Bengali film of 2004.

In 2005, Mallick appeared in Shubhodrishti, Manik, Yuddho and Chore Chore Mastuto Bhai. In 2005, Koel Mallick entered the Odia film industry for the first time. In her first Odia film, Premi No.1, Mallick acted opposite Anubhav Mohanty. She appeared in Yuddho opposite Mithun Chakraborty and Debashree Roy. The film recorded an initial collection of ₹ 12 million (12 million) in its first week. In 2006, she took on a more serious role in MLA Fatakeshto in which she played a reporter. She also starred in the 2008 film Love, the Bengali remake of Love Story.

=== Television ===
Mallick made her television debut with Zee Bangla's first Mahalaya in the year 2007 as Devi Mahisasuramardini and her various avatars. She also appeared in Didi No. 1 in 2010 as a celebrity contestant. She also hosted her first talk-show Katha O Kahini. The show went on to air on Star Jalsha.

In 2013 Mallick appeared as a celebrity judge in the Bengali version of Jhalak Dikhhla Jaa along with Bollywood choreographer Remo D'Souza. The show aired on ETV Bangla. She also starred in Dance Bangla Dance Junior as a Judge and in Season 11 as a celebrity judge. She was also seen in Zee Bangla's various reality shows like Rannaghor, Dadagiri Unlimited, and Didi No. 1.

Mallick and Jeet were also seen as a guests in the Star Jalsha serial Sansar Sukher Hoy Romonir Gune for the promotion of the movie 100% Love. Mallick has also appeared on the popular soap Bojhena Se Bojhena which is also aired on STAR Jalsha.

== Brand endorsements ==
Mallick has endorsed a variety of multi-national brands and has done television commercials for TVS Motor Company, glow & Lovely, Panasonic, and Vaseline.

== Political career ==
On 27 February 2026, Mallick was announced as the Trinamool Congress party candidate from West Bengal for the 2026 Rajya Sabha elections to be held on 16 March. She was sworn in as the Member of Parliament of Rajya Sabha on 6 April 2026. On 3 June 2026, she was appointed as a member of the Committee on Labour, Textiles and Skill Development. On July 16, 2026, she resigned from her Rajya Sabha membership.

On 4 October 2026, Mallick was re-nominated again for the Rajya Sabha membership she had vacated after the 2026 elections but this time as a Bharatiya Janata Party candidate. The following day, she officially joined the Bharatiya Janata Party, and filed her nomination.

== Personal life ==
Mallick married Nispal Singh (Rane) on 1 February 2013. They had been in a relationship for seven years before that, but both of them had decided to keep their relationship away from the glamour world of Tollywood. On 1 February 2020 she announced on Instagram that she was expecting her first child. On 5 May 2020, Mallick gave birth to a boy. The couple named their son Kabir Singh. On 3 October 2024 she announced the news of her second pregnancy via social media. On 14 December 2024 she gave birth to a baby girl. The couple named their daughter Kavya Singh.

== Filmography ==
=== Films ===
Denotes films that have not yet been released

- All films are in Bengali unless otherwise noted.

Year	Films	Role(s)	Notes
2003	Nater Guru	Manisha Mukherjee	Debut film; based on Samaresh Basu's novel of the same name; Winner, Tele Cine Awards for Best Actress; Winner, Kalakar Awards for Best Debutant Actress
2004	Badsha The King	Titli	
2004	Bandhan	Dual Roles; Meena and Reena Chowdhury	
2004	Shudhu Tumi	Nandini aka Bubly	
2004	Debipaksha	Jayanti	
2005	Manik	Riya Majumder	
2005	Yuddho	Barsha	
2005	Shubhodrishti	Sonali	Based on Jashwant Gangani's Gujarati story; Winner, Kalakar Awards for Best Rising Star; Winner, Anandalok Puraskar for Best Upcoming Star
2005	Chore Chore Mastuto Bhai	Malati	
2006	Hero	Puja Sen	
2006	Eri Naam Prem	Reena	
2006	Ghatak	Puja Roy	
2006	Shikar	Seema	
2006	MLA Fatakeshto	Chaitali Roy	
2007	Nabab Nandini	Nandini	
2007	Minister Fatakeshto	Chaitali Roy	
2007	Chander Bari	Nandita Sanyal	
2007	Mahanayak	Priti	Odia film; Dubbed in Bengali as Premi No. 1
2008	Premer Kahini	Barsha	
2008	Mon Mane Na	Riya Sen	
2008	Chirosathi	Riya	
2008	Love	Riya	Based on Erich Segal's 1970 novel Love Story
2008	Bor Asbe Ekhuni	Mitil	
2009	Saat Paake Bandha	Pallabi Sanyal	
2009	Jackpot	Piu	
2009	Neel Akasher Chadni	Chandni	
2009	Hitlist	Anindita	
2010	Bolo Na Tumi Aamar	Dr. Madhurima Chatterjee	
2010	Prem By Chance	Annapurna	
2010	Dui Prithibi	Dr. Nandini Sen	Inspired from Motorcycle Diaries (2004)
2010	Mon Je Kore Uru Uru	Diya	
2011	Paglu	Rimi Sen	
2012	100% Love	Anuradha Sen	
2012	Jaaneman	Riya	
2012	Hemlock Society	Meghna	
2012	Paglu 2	Riya	
2012	Dawshomi	Tuli	
2013	Rangbaaz	Madhurima	
2014	Arundhati	Dual roles; Rani Arundhati and Mishti	
2014	Chaar	Monika Nandi	Anthology film
2014	Highway	Sohini Dasgupta	
2015	Herogiri	Maria	
2015	Bangal Ghoti Fatafati	Jayanti	
2015	Besh Korechi Prem Korechi	Rai Roy	
2017	Chaya O Chobi	Rai	
2017	Cockpit	Riya	
2018	Ghare & Baire	Labanya	
2019	Shesh Theke Shuru	Pujarini	Based on the 2005 English novel Water & Fire
2019	Mitin Mashi	Pragyaparamita Mukherjee alias Mitin Mashi	Based on Suchitra Bhattacharya's story Haatey Matro Tintey Din
2019	Sagardwipey Jawker Dhan	Dr. Ruby Chatterjee	Sequel to Jawker Dhan (2017)
2020	Rawkto Rawhoshyo	Swarnaja	
2021	Flyover	Bidisha	
2021	Bony	Pratibha Mukherjee	Based on Shirshendu Mukhopadhyay's novel of the same name
2023	Jongole Mitin Mashi	Pragyaparamita Mukherjee alias Mitin Mashi	Sequel to Mitin Mashi (2019); based on Suchitra Bhattacharya's novel Saranday Shoytan
2025	Sonar Kellay Jawker Dhan	Dr. Ruby Chatterjee	
2025	Sharthopor	Aparna Ghoshal	
2025	Mitin: Ekti Khunir Sandhaney	Pragyaparamita Mukherjee alias Mitin Mashi	Third instalment of the Mitin Mashi franchise

=== Television ===
Year	Serial	Character	Channel
2011	Sansar Sukher Hoy Romonir Gune	Guest Appearance	Star Jalsha
2013	Dadagiri Unlimited Season 4	Guest Appearance for Promoting Rangbaaz; with Dev	Zee Bangla
2013	Jhalak Dikla Jaa	Judge	ETV Bangla
2013	Didi No.1 Season 4	Guest	Zee Bangla
2014	Bojhena Se Bojhena	Guest Appearance for Promoting Arundhati	Star Jalsha
2018	Dance Bangla Dance Season 10	Guest-Judge	Zee Bangla
2018	Didi No 1 Season 7	Guest	Zee Bangla
2020	Super Singer Grand Finale	Guest-Judge	Star Jalsha
2021	Dance Bangla Dance Season 11	Guest-Judge	Zee Bangla
2025	Star Jalsha Parivaar Awards	Special guest	Star Jalsha
2026	Star Jalsha Parivaar Awards	Special guest	Star Jalsha
2026	Dadagiri Unlimited	Special Guest	Zee Bangla

=== Mahalaya ===
Year	Mahalaya Title	Character	Channel	Ref.
10 October 2007	Mahishasurmardini	Devi Mahishasurmardini and her various avatars	Zee Bangla	
27 September 2011	Durga Durgatinashini	Devi Mahishasurmardini	Star Jalsha	
12 October 2015	Mahishasurmardini Nabarupe Nabadurga	Devi Sati, Devi Mahishasurmardini and her 9 avatars (Devi Shailaputri, Devi Brahmacharini, Devi Chandraghanta, Devi Kushmanda, Devi Skandamata, Devi Katyayani, Devi Kaalratri, Devi Mahagauri, Devi Siddhidatri)	Zee Bangla	
6 October 2021	Nabarupe Mahadurga	Devi Parvati, Devi Mahamaya, Devi Uma, & Devi Mahadurga/Mahishasurmardini	Colors Bangla	
14 October 2023	Ya Devi Sarvabhuteshu	Devi Parvati, Devi Sati and Devi Mahishasurmardini	Star Jalsha	
2 October 2024	Ranong Dehi	Bhairavi Maa, & Devi Mahishasurmardini	Star Jalsha	
21 September 2025	Matrirupeno Sanosthita	Devi Mahamaya, Devi Parvati & Devi Mahishasurmardini	Star Jalsha	

== Awards ==
Year	Award	Category	Character	Film/TV show
2004	Kalakar Awards	Best Debudant Actress	Manisha	Nater Guru
2004	Tele Cine Awards	Best Actress	Manisha	Nater Guru
2004	BFJA Awards	Most Promising Actress	Manisha	Nater Guru
2005	Kalakar Awards	Best Rising Star	Sonali	Shubhodrishti
2005	Anandalok Awards	Best Upcoming Star	Sonali	Shubhodrishti
2010	Zee Bangla Gourav Samman Award	Best Actress	Madhurima	Bolo Na Tumi Aamar
2010	Star Jalsa Entertainment Award	Best Actress	Nandini	Dui Prithibi
2010	Star Jalsa Entertainment Award	Best Actress	Madhurima	Bolo Na Tumi Aamar
2011	Star Jalsa Entertainment Award	Best Actress	Nandini	Dui Prithibi
2011	BFJA Awards	Best Actress Critics	Nandini	Dui Prithibi
2012	Zee Bangla Gourav Samman Award	Best Actress	Meghna	Hemlock Society
2013	BFJA Awards	Best Actress	Meghna	Hemlock Society
2014	Star Jalsa Entertainment Award	Best Actress	Arundhuri	Arundhati (2014 film)
2019	Films and Frames Digital Film Awards	Best Actress Critics	Mitin Mashi	Mitin Mashi
2019	Zee 24 Ghanta Swayang-Shiddha Awards			
2019	The Telegraph SHE Awards			
2019	WBFJA Awards	Most Popular Actor	Labanya	Ghare & Baire
2020	WBFJA Awards	Most Popular Actor	Mitin Mashi	Mitin Mashi
2022	Anandalok Impact Award			
2023	Mahanayok Samman			
2024	Star Jalsa Parivar Award	Best Entertainment Show	Goddess Sati, Parvati and Mahisasurmardini	Ya Devi Sarvabhuteshu
2024	Filmfare Awards Bangla	Best Film	Producer	Ardhangini
2025	Star Jalsa Parivar Award	Best Entertainment Show	Goddess Mahamaya and Mahisasurmardini	Ranong Dehi
2025	Joy Filmfare Glamour and Style Awards Bengal	Most Glamorous Star (Female)	Herself	
2025	TV 9 Bangla Ghorer Bioscope Award	Best Actress in a Leading Role	Mitin Mashi	Jongole Mitin Mashi
2026	Zee 24 Ghanta Binodoner Sera 24	Best Actor-Female	Aparna	Sharthopor
2026	Anandalok Awards	Best Actress (Popular Choice)	Aparna	Sharthopor
