= Media Worldwide Limited =

Indian media company

- Industry: Media
- Founded: 2005
- Headquarters: Mumbai, India
- Website: mediaworldwide.in

Media Worldwide Limited is an Indian media company based in Mumbai, India.

On 1 July 2007, Diary Sign was launched and discontinued on 11 December 2024.

== Owned channels ==
=== Ongoing channels ===
Channel	Launch	Language	Category	SD/HD availability	Notes
Sangeet Bangla	2005	Bengali	Music	SD	
Music India	2006	Hindi	Music	SD	
Sangeet Bhojpuri	2008	Bhojpuri	Music	SD	
Sangeet Marathi	2015	Marathi	Music	SD	

=== Defunct channels ===
Channel	Launch	Defunct	Language	Category	SD/HD availability	Notes
Bangla Talkies	2018	2023	Bengali	Music	SD	Rebranded as Woman TV
Woman TV	2023	2024	English	General Entertainment	SD	Previously known as Bangla Talkies
