= Sumit Ganguly =

American political scientist

- Education: Berea College; Miami University
- Known for: Rabindranath Tagore Chair in Indian Cultures and Civilizations
- Awards: Pravasi Bharatiya Samman
- Scientific career
- Fields: Political science
- Workplaces: Indiana University
- Thesis: (1984)

Sumit Ganguly is an American political scientist. He is a senior fellow at the Hoover Institution and a professor of political science at Indiana University and currently holds that University's Rabindranath Tagore Chair in Indian Cultures and Civilizations, focusing on comparative politics in South Asia.

Ganguly completed his undergraduate degree at Berea College in 1977, his master's degree from Miami University in 1978, and his Ph.D. in political science at the University of Illinois - Urbana-Champaign in 1984. Prior to being appointed at Indiana University, he taught at Michigan State University, Hunter College, Columbia University, and the University of Texas at Austin.

Ganguly was a founding editor of the journals India Review and Asian Security.

== Awards ==
Ganguly was awarded the Pravasi Bharatiya Samman (Distinguished Overseas Indian) award by the President of India in 2009.

== Published works ==
Books

- The Crisis in Kashmir: Portents of War, Hopes of Peace, Cambridge University Press, 1999. ISBN 9780521655668
- Conflict Unending: India–Pakistan Tensions since 1947, Columbia University Press, 2002. ISBN 9780231507400
- The Kashmir Question: Retrospect and Prospect, Routledge, 2004. ISBN 9781135756574
- Fearful Symmetry: India-Pakistan Crises in the Shadow of Nuclear Weapons (with Devin T. Hagerty), University of Washington, 2006. ISBN 978-0-295-98635-7
- Indian Foreign Policy, Oxford University Press, 2012. ISBN 9780198080367. Revised 2015: ISBN 9780198082217
- Deadly Impasse: India–Pakistan Relations at the Dawn of a New Century, Cambridge University Press, 2016. ISBN 9780521763615
- Ascending India and Its State Capacity: Extraction, Violence, and Legitimacy (with William R. Thompson), Yale University Press, 2017. ISBN 9780300224993
- The Future of ISIS: Regional and International Implications (with Feisal al-Istrabadi), Brookings Institution Press, 2018. ISBN 9780815732174

Edited works

- India as an Emerging Power, Routledge, 2004. ISBN 9781135761769
- US-Indian Strategic Cooperation into the 21st Century: More than Words (coedited with Andrew Scobell and Brian Shoup), Routledge, 2006. ISBN 9780415702157
- South Asia, New York University Press, 2006. ISBN 9780814731765
- India and Counterinsurgency: Lessons Learned, Routledge, 2009, ISBN 9781134008094
- Asian Rivalries: Conflict, Escalation, and Limitations on Two-level Games (co-edited with William R. Thompson), Stanford University Press, 2011. ISBN 9780804775960
- The Oxford Handbook of Indian Politics (co-edited with E. Sridharan), Oxford University Press, 2024, ISBN 978-0-19-889426-1.
