= Jeet Gannguli =

Indian score composer, music director and playback singer

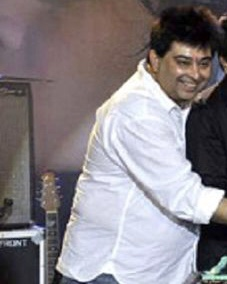

Background information
- Also known as: Jeet Ganguly
- Born: Chandrajeet Ganguly; 24 May 1971 (age 55)
- Origin: Baranagar, Kolkata
- Genres: Indian classical; Film scores; Indi-pop; Soundtrack
- Occupations: Playback Singer; Music director; Music Composer
- Instruments: Guitar; Instrument; Playback Singing
- Years active: 2001–present
- Labels: Sony Music, T-Series, Saregama, Zee Music, SVF

Jeet Gannguli (pronounced [dʒit ɡaŋɡuli], born Chandrajeet Ganguly, on 24 May 1971) is an Indian playback singer and composer who works in Hindi and Bengali cinema.

== Early life and education ==
Born in a Kulin Bengali Brahmin family, Gannguli was initiated into the world of music at the age of three. He was a student of Baranagore Ramakrishna Mission Ashrama High School from where he completed his schooling. Later he graduated from the University of Calcutta. He is trained in Indian classical music under the guidance of his father Kali Ganguly and his pisima (father's sister) Shibani Roychowdhury. He studied western classical music, jazz and rock with jazz guitarist Carlton Kitto.

== Career ==
Gannguli got his first break when Sanjay Gadhvi was signed on to direct Tere Liye and he, in turn, signed on his friends Jeet Gannguli and Pritam as music composers. In 2002 Yash Raj Films signed Gadhvi up to direct Mere Yaar Ki Shaadi Hai, for which the Gannguli-Pritam duo composed the music. But due to some misunderstanding, soon after the film, Gannguli decided to split and the partners went their separate ways.

He then started scoring music for Hindi and Bengali films, TV serials and jingles.

He has composed several songs for several Hindi movies like Khamoshiyan, Aashiqui 2, Hamari Adhuri Kahani, Rustom, Raaz Reboot, etc. which became hits.

Gannguli has also composed several songs for Bengali films like Shubhodrishti, Chirodini Tumi Je Amar, Mon Mane Na, Challenge, Dui Prithibi, Paglu, Awara, Paglu 2, Challenge 2, Boss: Born to Rule, Rangbaaz, Chirodini Tumi Je Amar, Boss 2: Back To Rule, Tonic.

== Discography ==
=== Select discography ===
- "Suno Na Sangemarmar" from Youngistaan
- "Teri Khushboo" from Mr. X
- "Baatein Ye Kabhi Na" from Khamoshiyan
- "Chahun Main Ya Naa" from Aashiqui 2
- "Muskurane" from CityLights
- "Bol Naa Aar" from Dui Prithibi
- Babloo Bachelor

== Awards and nominations ==
=== Bengali Cinema Awards ===
Year	Film	Award	Category	Result
2005	Yuddho	Filmfare Awards East	Best Music Director	Won
2005	Shubhodrishti	Anandalok Awards	Best Music Director	Won
2007	MLA Fatakeshto	Tele Cine Awards	Best Music Director	Won
2008	Minister Fatakeshto	Tele Cine Awards	Best Music Director	Won
2009	Chirodini Tumi Je Amar	Anandalok Award	Best Music Director	Won
2010	Challenge	Anandalok Award	Best Music Director	Won
2010	Poran Jaye Jolia Re	Star Jalsa Entertainment Award	Best Music Director	Won
2013	Bapi Bari Jaa	Tele Cine Awards	Best Music Director	Won
2014	Boss: Born to Rule	Kalakar Award	Best Music Director	Won
2014	Boss: Born to Rule	Mirchi Music Awards Bangla	Best Music Director	Won
2014	Boss: Born to Rule	Filmfare Awards Bangla	Best Music Director	Won
2014	Rangbaaz	Zee Bangla Gaurav Samman Award	Best Music Director	Won
2026	Projapoti 2	West Bengal Film Journalists' Association Awards	Best Music Director	Won

=== Hindi Cinema Awards ===
Year	Film/Song	Award	Category	Result
2009	Morning Walk	Mirchi Music Awards	Upcoming Music Composer of The Year	Won
2013	"Tum Hi Ho" from Aashiqui 2	BIG Star Entertainment Awards	Most Entertaining Song	Won
2014	"Tum Hi Ho" from Aashiqui 2	Bollywood Hungama Surfers' Choice Music Awards	Best Song	Won
2014	"Tum Hi Ho" from Aashiqui 2	Global Indian Music Academy Awards	Best Song	Won
2014	"Tum Hi Ho" from Aashiqui 2	Zee Cine Awards	Best Song	Won
2014	Aashiqui 2	Filmfare Awards	Best Music Director	Won
2014	Aashiqui 2	Zee Cine Awards	Best Music Director	Won
2014	Aashiqui 2	IIFA Awards	Best Music Director	Won
2014	Aashiqui 2	Bollywood Hungama Surfers' Choice Music Awards	Best Soundtrack	Won
2014	Aashiqui 2	Global Indian Music Academy Awards	Best Film Album	Won
2014	Aashiqui 2	IBNLive Movie Awards	Best Music Director	Won
2014	Aashiqui 2	Mirchi Music Awards	Album of The Year	Won
2015	CityLights	Mirchi Music Awards	Album of The Year	Won
2015	"Muskurane" from CityLights	Mirchi Music Awards	Music Composer of The Year	Won
2015	"Muskurane" from CityLights	Bollywood Hungama Surfers' Choice Music Awards	Best Song	Nominated
2015	"Suno Na Sangemarmar" from Youngistaan	Bollywood Hungama Surfers' Choice Music Awards	Best Song	Nominated

== See also ==
- List of Indian film music directors
