= Akriti Kakar =

Indian singer (born 1986)

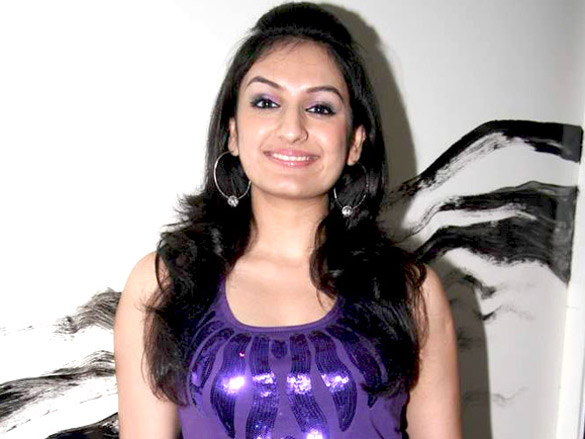
- Kakar in a radio session
- Born: 7 August 1986 (age 40); Delhi, India
- Occupations: Singer; composer
- Years active: 2000–present
- Spouse: Chirag Arora (m. 2016)
- Children: 1
- Relatives: Sukriti Kakar (sister); Prakriti Kakar (sister)
- Musical career
- Genre: Playback singing
- Instrument: Vocalist

Akriti Kakar (born 7 August 1986) is an Indian singer and composer. Her songs, "Saturday Saturday" from the film Humpty Sharma Ki Dulhania and "Iski Uski" from 2 States became popular. Akriti was a judge on Zee Bangla's Sa Re Ga Ma Pa: Li'l Champs and was going to appear on Colors TV's Jhalak Dikhhla Jaa.

== Personal life ==
Kakar was born and brought up in Delhi. She has two sisters, twins Sukriti Kakar and Prakriti Kakar, who are also professional playback singers.

Kakar married director Chirag Arora in March 2016. They had a son in November 2023.

== Career ==
Akriti released her solo album non-Bollywood playback album – "Akriti" released in April 2010 under Sony Music India. Songs were composed by Shankar Mahadevan & Akriti Kakar.

Akriti also released a song entitled "Ring Diamond Di" with Santosh Singh featuring Madhuri. The song was embroiled in controversy when the Music Video was allegedly plagiarised with Girls' Generation's "The Boys" and "I Got a Boy".

She has also sung a song in Marathi for the film – Lagna Pahave Karun ( Marathi movie) song name is "Kasa Ha Maza Sajana". Besides these Akriti has also sung many songs in other regional languages, the song in Bengali Film Paglu has become the biggest chart buster song in Bengali films. On 12 April 2010, a solo music album "Akriti", composed by Shankar Mahadevan and Akriti, was released on Sony Music.

She also released her first single named #Kolkata Diaries. Composed by the renowned Bengali musical maestro, Joy Sarkar. The lyrics of the entire song are in Hindi written by Manoj Yadav who is popular for his songs in Coke studio and movies; but for the main hook lines that are derived from a popular Bengali folk song "Tomay Hrid Majhare Rakhibo, Chede Debo Na" that literally translate into "I am going to keep you in my heart and never let you go!".

In end of 2018, on 23 December, her new song titled "Dui Deewana" which was a duet with Sarbajit Ghosh, the writer, composer & producer of the song, was released from the musical movie MONN, under the record label of Amara Muzik. The video of the song featured Sarbajit Ghosh & model Suman Karmakar as the Leads..

== Discography ==
| Denotes films that have not yet been released |

=== Film Songs ===
==== Hindi ====
| Year | Film | Song | Music | Lyrics | Co-singer(s) | Notes |
|---|---|---|---|---|---|---|
| 2006 | Rocky | "My Love For You" | Himesh Reshammiya | Sameer | Himesh Reshammiya | |
| 2006 | Chup Chup Ke | "Dil Vich Lagya Ve" | Himesh Reshammiya | Sameer | Sonu Nigam, Kunal Ganjawala | |
| 2007 | Shakalaka Boom Boom | "Shakalaka Boom Boom" | Himesh Reshammiya | Sameer | Himesh Reshammiya | |
| 2007 | Shakalaka Boom Boom | "Dil Lagaayenge" | Himesh Reshammiya | Sameer | Himesh Reshammiya | |
| 2007 | Red: The Dark Side | "Loneliness is Killing" | Himesh Reshammiya | Sameer | Himesh Reshammiya | |
| 2007 | Red: The Dark Side | "Loneliness is Killing" (Remix by DJ Akbar Sami) | Himesh Reshammiya | Sameer | Himesh Reshammiya | |
| 2007 | Namastey London | "Aanan Faanan" | Himesh Reshammiya | Javed Akhtar | Jayesh Gandhi | |
| 2007 | Namastey London | "Aanan Faanan" (Mehfil Mix) | Himesh Reshammiya | Javed Akhtar | Jayesh Gandhi | |
| 2007 | Namastey London | "Aanan Faanan" (Remix) | Himesh Reshammiya | Javed Akhtar | Jayesh Gandhi | |
| 2007 | Good Boy, Bad Boy | "Good Boy Bad Boy" | Himesh Reshammiya | Sameer | Himesh Reshammiya | |
| 2007 | Good Boy, Bad Boy | "Good Boy Bad Boy" (Remix) | Himesh Reshammiya | Sameer | Himesh Reshammiya | |
| 2007 | Apne | "Dekhoon Tujhe" | Himesh Reshammiya | Sameer | Himesh Reshammiya | |
| 2007 | Apne | "Dekhoon Tujhe To Pyaar Aaye" (Remix) | Himesh Reshammiya | Sameer | Himesh Reshammiya | |
| 2007 | Johnny Gaddaar | "Johnny Gaddaar" | Shankar–Ehsaan–Loy | Jaideep Sahni | Suraj Jagan | |
| 2007 | Dhol | "Haadsa" | Pritam | Irshad Kamil | Sunidhi Chauhan | |
| 2007 | Mummy Ji | "Awaaz Do" | Aadesh Shrivastava | Sameer | Shaan, Richa Sharma, Hemachandra | |
| 2007 | Welcome | "Insha Allah" | Himesh Reshammiya | Sameer | Shaan, Krishna Beuraa | |
| 2008 | Kismat Konnection | "Move Your Body Now" | Pritam | Shabbir Ahmed | Shaan, Hard Kaur | |
| 2008 | Kismat Konnection | "Move Your Body Now – Hip Hop Mix" | Pritam | Shabbir Ahmed | Shaan, Hard Kaur, Adeel Chaudhry, Suhail Kaul | |
| 2008 | Kidnap | "Meri Ek Ada Shola" | Pritam | Mayur Puri | Sukhwinder Singh, Sunidhi Chauhan | |
| 2008 | Hari Puttar: A Comedy of Terrors | "Bhai Aa Gaya" | Aadesh Shrivastava | Sameer | Vicky Chandra | |
| 2008 | Golmaal Returns | "Tha Kar Ke" | Pritam | Sameer | Neeraj Shridhar, Anwesha Datta Gupta, Earl, Indie | |
| 2008 | Golmaal Returns | "Tha Kar Ke" (Remix) | Pritam | Sameer | | |
| 2009 | Billu Barber | "Khudaya Khair" | Pritam | Gulzar | Soham Chakrabarty, Monali Thakur | |
| 2009 | Billu Barber | "Khudaya Khair" (Reprise) | Pritam | Gulzar | Abhijeet Bhattacharya | |
| 2009 | Billu Barber | "Marjaani (Kilogram's Balkan Mix)" | Pritam | Gulzar | KK | |
| 2009 | Aa Dekhen Zara | "Mohabbat Aapse" | Pritam | Irshad Kamil | | |
| 2010 | We are Family | "Dil Khol Ke Let's Rock" | Shankar–Ehsaan–Loy | Anvita Dutt | Anushka Manchanda, Suraj Jagan | |
| 2010 | Mirch | "Teekhi Teekhi" | Monty Sharma | Javed Akhtar | | |
| 2010 | Tere Bin Laden | "I Love Amreeka" | Shankar–Ehsaan–Loy | Jaideep Sahni | Ali Zafar, Shankar Mahadevan, Anusha Mani | |
| 2010 | Tere Bin Laden | "I Love Amreeka" (Reprise) | Shankar–Ehsaan–Loy | Jaideep Sahni | Ali Zafar, Anusha Mani | |
| 2012 | Jism 2 | "Abhi Abhi" (Duet with Akriti Kakar) | Arko Pravo Mukherjee | Manish Makhija, Arko | KK | |
| 2013 | Raqt | "Tu Hi Tu" | Daboo Malik | Panchhi Jalonvi | Shaan | |
| 2014 | 2 States | "Iski Uski" | Shankar–Ehsaan–Loy | Amitabh Bhattacharya | Shahid Mallya, Shankar Mahadevan | |
| 2014 | Humpty Sharma Ki Dulhania | "Saturday Saturday" | Shaarib–Toshi, Badshah, The Titans | Indeep Bakshi, Badshah, Kumaar | Indeep Bakshi, Badshah | |
| 2014 | Humpty Sharma Ki Dulhania | "Daingad Daingad" | Sachin–Jigar | Irshad Kamil | Udit Narayan, Divya Kumar, Pratibha Baghel, Deepali Sathe, Niharika Sinha | |
| 2015 | Ranviir the Marshal | "Saware Naino" | Ricky Mishra | Rajan Kheda | Kunal Ganjawala | |
| 2019 | Milan Talkies | "Jobless" | Akriti Kakar | | Sukriti Kakar, Prakriti Kakar | |
| 2019 | Bombairiya | "Bairiya" | Arko Pravo Mukherjee | | Navraj Hans | |

==== Bengali ====
| Year | Film | Song | Music | Lyrics | Co-singer(s) | Notes |
|---|---|---|---|---|---|---|
| 2011 | Paglu | "Paglu Title Track" | Jeet Gannguli | Priyo Chattopadhyay | Mika Singh | |
| 2011 | Paglu | "Paglu" (Remix) | Jeet Gannguli | Priyo Chattopadhyay | Mika Singh | |
| 2011 | Paglu | "Mon Bebagi" | Jeet Gannguli | Prasen | Kunal Ganjawala, Rana Mazumder | |
| 2011 | Paglu | "Prem Ki Bujhini" | Jeet Gannguli | Prasen | Zubeen Garg | |
| 2012 | Challenge 2 | "Police Chorer Preme Poreche | Jeet Gannguli | Raja Chanda | Abhijeet Bhattacharya | |
| 2012 | Chaya Chobi | "Mon" | Arfin Rumey | Moushumi | Abhijeet Bhattacharya | |
| 2013 | Khoka 420 | "Gobhir Joler Fish" (Title Track) | Savvy Gupta | | Abhijeet Bhattacharya | |
| 2013 | Boss: Born to Rule | "Jhinkunakur Na" | Jeet Gannguli | Meghnad | Rana Mazmudar | |
| 2013 | Rangbaaz | "Tui Amar Hero" | Jeet Gannguli | Raja Chanda | Mika Singh | |
| 2013 | Na Jene Mon | "Mon Amar" | Sanjib Sarkar | Proloy | | |
| 2014 | Game | "Bum Chiki Chikni Chiki" | Jeet Gannguli | Raja Chanda | Nakash Aziz | |
| 2014 | Game | "Ore Manwa Re" | Jeet Gannguli | Prasen | Arijit Singh | |
| 2014 | Bachchan | "Latai" | Jeet Gannguli | Raja Chanda | Vinod Rathod | |
| 2015 | Besh Korechi Prem Korechi | "Besh Korechi Prem Korechi (Title Track)" | Jeet Gannguli | Raja Chanda | Shaan | |
| 2015 | Aashiqui | "Ei Aashiqui" | Savvy Gupta | Prasen | Mohammed Irfan | Indo-Bangladeshi film |
| 2015 | Black | "Moyna Cholat Cholat" | Dabbu | Raja Chanda | | |
| 2016 | Beparoyaa | "Piya Basanti" | Indra, Kutty | Dipankar | Benny Dayal | |
| 2016 | Power | "Missed Call" | Jeet Gannguli | Raja Chanda | Nakash Aziz | |
| 2016 | Rokto | "Dhim Tana" | Savvy | Priyo Chattopadhyay | | Indo-Bangladeshi film |
| 2017 | Nabab | "Sholoana" | Savvy Gupta | Prasen | Shadaab Hashmi | |
| 2017 | Shrestha Bangali | "Dhinka Chikaa" | Sanjeev–Darshan | Lipi | Nakash Aziz | |
| 2018 | Sultan: The Saviour | "Masha Allah" | Savvy Gupta | Raja Chanda | Dev Negi | |
| 2021 | Nirbhaya | "Onek Kotha Baki" | Pratik Kundu | | | |

==== Punjabi ====
| Year | Film | Song | Music | Lyrics | Co-singer(s) | Notes |
|---|---|---|---|---|---|---|
| 2011 | Mummy Punjabi | "Awaaz Do" | Aadesh Shrivastava | Sameer | Shaan, Richa Sharma | |

==== Marathi ====
| Year | Film | Song | Music | Lyrics | Co-singer(s) | Notes |
|---|---|---|---|---|---|---|
| 2013 | Lagna Pahave Karun | "Kasa Ha Majha Saajna" | Ajay Naik | Ajay Naik, Kshitij Patwardhan | | |
| 2013 | Sugar Salt Ani Prem | "Disha Milali Aaj" | Soumil Shringarpure, Siddharth Mahadevan | Mandar Cholkar | Siddharth Mahadevan | |

=== Non-film Songs ===
==== Hindi ====
| Year | Album | Song(s) | Music | Note |
|---|---|---|---|---|
| 2004 | Baby Doll Chapter 2 | "Rangeela Re/Ho Ja Rangeela Re" | Harry Anand | |
| 2010 | AKRITI | "Mehrmaa Ve" | Shankar Mahadevan, Akriti Kakar | |
| 2010 | AKRITI | "Swag Wali Bride" | Shankar Mahadevan, Akriti Kakar | |
| 2010 | AKRITI | "Gazab" | Shankar Mahadevan, Akriti Kakar | |
| 2010 | AKRITI | "Chhoone Do" | Shankar Mahadevan, Akriti Kakar | |
| 2010 | AKRITI | "Na Re Na Na Re" | Shankar Mahadevan, Akriti Kakar | |
| 2010 | AKRITI | "Dil Vi Deewana" | Shankar Mahadevan, Akriti Kakar | |
| 2010 | AKRITI | "Taabiz (Marhale)" | Shankar Mahadevan, Akriti Kakar | |
| 2010 | AKRITI | "Chal Kaheen Sang" | Shankar Mahadevan, Akriti Kakar | |
| 2016 | Batti Gul | "Batti Gul" | Akriti Kakar | |
| 2016 | Bollywood Retro Lounge | "Baahon Ke Darmiyaan" | Jai-Parthiv (Studio Unplugged), Jatin–Lalit | |
| 2016 | Bollywood Unwind–Session 3–Romantic Classics in a relaxing urban avatar | "Bhool Gaya Sab Kuch" | Aditya Paudwal, Rajesh Roshan | |
| 2018 | Tujhe Meri Yaadein | "Tujhe Meri Yaadein" | Dino James | |

==== Bengali ====
| Year | Album | Song(s) | Music | Note |
|---|---|---|---|---|
| 2018 | Monn | "Dui Deewana" | Sarbajit Ghosh | |
| 2019 | Oriplast Originals | "Rongila Re Mon (রঙ্গিলা রে মন)" | Ajay Singha | |
| 2019 | Oriplast Originals | "Bola Jaye Na (বলা যায় না)" | Arko | |

== TV shows ==
- She was a celebrity judge in Zee Bangla Sa Re Ga Ma Pa: Li'l Champs 2013 along with Kumar Sanu and other regional and national celebrities.
- Akriti was supposed to enter the dance show Jhalak Dikhlaa Jaa on Colors channel through wild card but sadly met with an accident while rehearsing and doctor advised complete bed-rest and hence she had to quit the show.
- In 2020, she became a judge in Zee Bangla's Sa Re Ga Ma Pa 2020 along with Mika Singh, Joy Sarkar, and Srikanto Acharya with Abir Chatterjee as host.
