= Raadha (TV series) =

Indian Bengali television series

- Genre: Drama; Comedy; Romance
- Created by: Surinder Films
- Written by: Sayantani Bhattacharya; Rupa Banerjee; Priyanka Seth
- Directed by: Rajat Paul; Subhasish Mondal
- Starring: Aemila Sadhukhan; Ravi Shaw; Rohit Mukherjee; Dolly Basu; Anindita Bose
- Opening theme: Raadha by Madhuraa Bhattacharya
- Composer: Debjit Roy
- Country of origin: India
- Original language: Bengali
- No. of episodes: 385

Production
- Producers: Surinder Singh; Nispal Singh
- Production location: Kolkata
- Cinematography: Paritosh Singh
- Running time: 22 minutes
- Production company: Surinder Films

Original release
- Network: Zee Bangla
- Release: 31 October 2016 – 8 December 2017

Related
- Esho Maa Lakshmi; Rangiye Diye Jao

Raadha is a popular Bengali television Soap opera that premiered on 31 October 2016, and aired on Zee Bangla. It was produced by Surinder Films and starred Aemila Sadhukhan and Ravi Shaw in the lead roles, with Monalisa Paul as the main antagonist. The show used to telecast Monday to Friday at 10:30 p.m. It originally aired at 6:00 p.m. until it got a new timeslot at 10:30 p.m. because of Joyee replacing its old timeslot. The show went off air on 8 December 2017. It was replaced by Rangiye Diye Jao.

== Cast ==
- Aemila Sadhukhan as Radharani Banerjee aka Raadha /Sonali Jaiswal
- Ravi Shaw as Krishna Raj Banerjee aka Krish
- Rupsa Chatterjee as Zaara Basu
- Dolly Basu as Shobha Banerjee / Abha (Double Role): Krish & Kakon's mother, Shobha's sister (Krish and Kakon's aunt)
- Anindita Bose as Konkona/Kakon; Krish's sister
- Bodhisatwa Mazumdar as Subhendu Banerjee; Krish & Kakon's father
- Rohit Mukherjee as Dulal Bera; Raadha, Beena & Loksmhi's father, Monorama's husband
- Tanuka Chatterjee as Monoroma; Radha's stepmother & Beena-Lokkhi's mother, Dulal's second wife
- Shakuntala Barua as Krish's Grandmother
- Biplab Banerjee as Dibyendu Banerjee
- Abanti Dutta as Ramola Banerjee
- Jayashree Mukherjee Kaul as Shiuli Banerjee
- Nibedita Biswas / Soumi Chakraborty as Beena; Dulal's and Monorama's daughter, Lokkhi's elder sister, Radha's step and Younger Sister
- Sakshi Dona Saha as Lokkhi; Dulal and Monorama's second daughter, Beena's younger sister, Radha's step and younger sister.
- Sohan Bandopadhyay as Siddhartha; Zaara's father
- Anindita Saha Kapileshwari as Anamika; Zaara's mother
- Tathagata Mukherjee as Ronojoy Sanyal
- Kaushambi Chakraborty as Rupsha
- Monalisa Paul as Sunny
- Sonamana Arinsha as Muskaan
