= Anweshaa =

Indian playback singer and composer (born 1993)

- Born: Anwesha Kushal Dattagupta; 15 December 1993 (age 32); Virar, Maharashtra, India
- Origin: Golf Green, Kolkata, India
- Genres: Playback singing, Indian classical music, Indie-Pop
- Occupation: Singer
- Instrument: Vocal
- Years active: 2008–present
- Website: anwesshaa.com

Anwesha Mitra Dattagupta (born 15 December 1993) is an Indian singer and composer who performs in Hindi, Bengali, Kannada, Tamil, and Marathi.

== Early life and education ==
Anweshaa was born on 15 December 1993 in indian, Maharashtra. At the age of three she moved to Kolkata. Her mother was a singer. At the age of four Anweshaa started training under composer Shri Jayanta Sarkar.

Anweshaa attended Lycée School, Kolkata, and later graduated from Amity University.

== Music career ==
Anweshaa gained recognition as a contestant on the Amul STAR Voice of India reality TV spinoff Chhote Ustaad at the age of 13. She participated in several musical reality TV shows. Her career as a playback singer began with a cover of the song "Ek Je Achhe Raja" in the Bengali film Khela (2008). Anweshaa's first breakthrough in Bollywood was in Golmaal Returns for composer Pritam Chakraborty at the age of 14. Since then, her body of work has primarily involved composing music for films. She received the Filmfare Award East in 2014 in recognition of her accomplishments in regional cinema music.

In January 2003, she was a finalist in the Tarana music competition broadcast on ETV Bangla.

In 2023, she composed music and background score for the Marathi film Pahije Jatiche and made her debut in Marathi cinema.

== Compositions ==
Anweshaa composed and scripted the lyrics for the following singles:

- Kagojer Nouko Acoustic guitar – Rhythm Shaw, Sound engineer – Kohinoor Mukherjee
- Devaa Vocals – Anweshaa and Kaustuv Kanti Ganguly
- Dhun Bihu ki pukare Vocals – Trijoy Deb and Anweshaa
- Maahiya Vocals – Anweshaa, Music producer – Akshay Akash
- Khaamoshiyaan Vocals – Anweshaa, Arrangement – Akshay Akash, Piano – Akshay Menon, Table – Amit Choubey, Mixing – Kohinoor Mukherjee
- Gotihara Dupur Music Producer – Shamik Chakravarty, Mixing & Mastering – Ananjan Chakraborty, Video – Visual Diary Motion Picture
- Swapno bari (Acoustic guitar – Rhythm Shaw, Sound engineer – Kohinoor Mukherjee)
- Mizaaj-e-ishq – Hindi Indi-pop album
- Aye chol – Vocals: Anweshaa and Sharmishtha
- Mehek – Vocals: Anweshaa, Sound engineer – Kohinoor Mukherjee, Producer – Akshay Menon
- Balcony – Vocals: Anweshaa
- Teri kami – Vocals: Anweshaa and Abhay Jodhpurkar, Sound engineer – Kohinoor Mukherjee, Producer: Akshay Menon
- Mere Khuda – Vocals: Kinjal Chatterjee, Producer: Nayan Mani Barman, Mixing: Kohinoor Mukherjee
- Dooriyaan – Vocals: Anweshaa
- Mere Khuda – Vocals: Kinjal Chatterjee
- Swapno Michhil – Vocals: Anweshaa and Shovan Ganguly
- Bhalo Theko – Vocals: Durnibar Saha
- Intezaar – Vocals: Anweshaa
- Smritir Poth Beye – Vocals: Anweshaa
- Swag Wala Pyaar – Vocals: Hriti Tikadar
- Adhure Chithhi – Vocals: Anweshaa
- Besabri – Vocals: Anweshaa & Abhay Jodhpurkar, Producer: Akshay Menon
- Elomelo Din – Vocals: Manomay Bhattacharya & Anweshaa
- Samandar – Vocals: Anweshaa
- Hote Paari – Vocals: Anweshaa

== Filmography (partial list) ==
=== Bengali ===
| Year | Movie | Songs | Music director | Co-singer(s) |
|---|---|---|---|---|
| 2008 | Khela | "Ek Je Ache Raja" | Sanjay-Raja | Uppal Sengupta |
| 2009 | Premer Phande Kakatua | "Kholo Moner Pinjra" | Ashok Raj | Gautam Aditya |
| 2009 | Love Connection | "Tip Tip" | Ashok Raj | Aneek Dhar |
| 2009 | Love Connection | "Maahi Ve" | Ashok Raj | solo |
| 2009 | Love Connection | "O Shona Re" | Ashok Raj | Raghav Chatterjee, Diya Roy Chowdhury |
| 2009 | Olot Palot | "Elatin Belatin" | Ricket Mondal | Emon Chatterjee |
| 2009 | Prem Bandhan | "Aaj Bolchhey Bolchhey Mon" | Noni Gopal, Arunava | Solo |
| 2009 | Prem Bandhan | "Shono E Mon Chay Kake" | Noni Gopal, Arunava | Saptak Bhattacharya |
| 2009 | Rajdrohi | "Dekhlam Dekhar Por" | Babul Bose | Javed Ali |
| 2010 | 10th July | "Amra Sobai" | Devjit Ray | Debasmita |
| 2010 | Jeena | "Edin Aji Kon Ghore Go" | Rabindranath Tagore | Solo |
| 2010 | Jeena | "Agoon Chhuechhe Mon" | Shamik Sinha | Rupankar |
| 2010 | Nayika | "Baje Ghungroo Payete" | Arup-Pranay | solo |
| 2010 | Path Jodi Na Sesh Hoi | "Aaj Mon Meghla" | Rocket Mondol | Raghav Chatterjee |
| 2010 | Path Jodi Na Sesh Hoi | "Papiya Piya Bole" | Rocket Mondol | Solo |
| 2011 | Ajob Prem Ebong | "Brishti" | Shamik Sinha | solo |
| 2011 | Ajob Prem Ebong | "Door Theke Aaro Dure" | Shamik Sinha | Shaan |
| 2011 | Achena Prem | "Tomake Bhebe Mon" | Ashok Bhadra | Javed Ali |
| 2011 | Bindaas Prem | "Notun Ronge Ara Notun Sure" | Babul Bose | Anupama Deshpande |
| 2011 | Mon Bole Priya Priya | "Tumi Ele Jibane" | Soumitra Kundu | Aneek Dhar |
| 2011 | Run | "Bhalobasha Aalo Naki (female)" | | solo |
| 2012 | Accident | "Jaane Jaan" | Joy Sarkar | |
| 2012 | 100% Love | "Tumse Pyaar Hai Already" | Samidh Mukerjee | Samidh Mukerjee |
| 2012 | Bojhena Shey Bojhena | "Bojhena Se Bojhena" | Indradeep Dasgupta | Arijit Singh |
| 2012 | Jaal | "Nesha" | Ashok Raj | Aneek Dhar |
| 2012 | Hothat Sedin | "Tumi Asbe Bhalobasbe" | Debjit Ray | Solo |
| 2013 | Rupkatha Noy | "Saaradin aar saara raat" | Joy Sarkar | solo |
| 2013 | Kanamachi | "Mon Baware" | Indradeep Dasgupta | Arijit Singh, Timir Biswas, Ujjaini Mukherjee |
| 2013 | Proloy | "Roshni Alo" | Indradeep Dasgupta | Arijit Singh |
| 2013 | Tobe Tai Hok | "Mone Porche Mone" | Debojyoti Mishra | Rupankar |
| 2013 | Tiyasha | "Bheja Bheja" | | solo |
| 2014 | Troyee | "Anjoli Anjoli" | | Supratik |
| 2014 | Yoddha: The Warrior | "Sharatadin" | Indradip Dasgupta | Arijit Singh |
| 2015 | Black | "Halka Halka" | Dabbu | Shaan |
| 2015 | Abby Sen | "Taake Khuji" | Joy Sarkar | — |
| 2015 | Aschhe Bachhor Abaar Hobe | "Chine Phelechhi Rastaghat" | Indradeep Dasgupta | Arijit Singh |
| 2015 | Abby Sen | "Eka Eka" | Joy Sarkar | Rupankar |
| 2015 | Natoker Moto | "Swopno Din" | Debojyoti Mishra | Solo |
| 2015 | Natoker Moto | "Pashapashi Hete Jete Jete" | Debojyoti Mishra | Solo |
| 2015 | Bodhon | "Ek Phali Rod" | Mayuk Mainak | Solo |
| 2015 | Rajkahini | "Bharoto Bhagyo Bidhata" | Rabindranath Tagore | Various artists |
| 2016 | Power | "Aaj Amaye" | Jeet Gannguli | Jeet Gannguli |
| 2016 | Postmaster | "Tomay Gaan Shonabo" | | solo |
| 2016 | Postmaster | "Ammay Jodi Mon Debe" | | Samantak Sinha |
| 2016 | Postmaster | "Aay Bondhu Aay" | | Trishna Parui, Deblina Bhattacharya |
| 2016 | Tui Je Amar | Ektu Chowate | Ashok Bhadra | Zubeen Garg |
| 2016 | Aynabaji | "Dhire Dhire Jaona Somoy" | Habib Wahid | Habib Wahid |
| 2016 | Jhapta | "Aaj Noy Shono" | Bikash Samanta | Kumar Sanu |
| 2016 | Thammar Boyfriend | "Sukho Thikana" | Dolaan Mainnakk | |
| 2016 | Haripad Bandwala | "Bojhabo Ki Kore" | Indraadip Dasgupta | Arijit Singh |
| 2016 | Chocolate | "Dhowa Tulsi Pata" | Indradip Dasgupta | Solo |
| 2016 | Shatru | "Janina" | Indradip Dasgupta | Shaan |
| 2017 | Tomake Chai | "Bhalo Laage Tomake" | Indraadip Dasgupta | Arijit Singh |
| 2017 | Amar Aponjon | "Amar Je Kichu Kotha" | Dabbu | |
| 2017 | Biporjoy | "Zindagi Udaas Hai" | Abhishek Kohinoor | Kohinoor Haldar |
| 2017 | Mondobashar Golpo | "Shunechi Monke Bojhano Shokto Khub" | Ashok Bhadra | Anupam Roy |
| 2018 | Kaya | "Dhoyan Dhoyan" | Anindya Sahor | |
| 2018 | Kaya | "Moner ei janala" | Shubhayoo | |
| 2018 | Dwikhondito | "Churi Jai Beduwiner" | Arup Bhattacharjee | Solo |
| 2018 | Raja Rani Raji | "Kholakhuli Bolte Gele" | Lincon | Raj Barman |
| 2018 | Tobuo Basanta | "Jani Jani Ami Jani" | Soumitra Chatterjee | Solo |
| 2018 | Tobuo Basanta | "Life Is Short Be A Rockstar" | Samantak | Solo |
| 2018 | Kuasha Jakhon | "Elomelo Hawa" | Chirantan | Chirantan |
| 2018 | Gobhir Gopan Brishti | "Amar Sakal Rasher Dhara" | Rabindranath Tagore | Solo |
| 2018 | Chaturtho Ripu | "Chhilo Akela" | Milon Sumon | Shaan |
| 2019 | Nabajiban Bima Company | "Urte Diyechi" | Kumar Sanu | Sonu Nigam |
| 2019 | Lime 'N' Light | "Khamoshiyaan" | anweshaa | Javed Ali |
| 2019 | Lime 'N' Light | "Superstar" | anweshaa | Sunidhi Chauhan |
| 2019 | Lime 'N' Light | "Eki Meyer Golpo" | anweshaa | Solo |
| 2019 | Lime 'N' Light | "Limelite" | anweshaa | Solo |
| 2019 | The Nagarik | "Jhilmil Akash" | | solo |
| 2019 | Dwikhondito | "Churi Jaay" | Arup Bhattacharya | Solo |
| 2020 | Bohomaan | "Rangi Saari Gulaabi" | Pt. Tanmoy Bose | Solo |
| 2020 | Draupadi | "Aaro Ekta Din" | Avik Bhagat | solo |
| 2020 | SOS Kolkata | "Thik Bhul Bhule Ami" | Savvy, Pratik Kundu | Pratik Kundu |
| 2020 | Sanjhbati | "Kagojer Bari" | Anupam Roy | Solo |
| 2020 | Shlilotahanir Pore | "Chup Kotha" | Bappa Aurindam | Debopriyo Das |
| 2021 | Magic | "E Naamey Se Naamey" | Dabbu | Shaan |
| 2021 | Iskabon | "Jonaki" | Anindya Mukherjee | Rupankar Bagchi |
| 2021 | Golper Mayajal | "Megher Rumal" | Ashu | Shaan |
| 2021 | Antardhaan | "Ichhedana" | Biswadeep Biswas | Solo |
| 2022 | Abar Bochhor Koori Pore | "Dekha Hoye Jay" | Ranajoy Bhattacharya | Ranajoy Bhattacharya |
| 2022 | Kothamrito | "Thekechi Bhabe Arite" | Prasen Mainak | Rupankar Bagchi |
| 2022 | Jotugriho | "Tui takalei je" | Dabbu | Raj Barman |
| 2023 | Shudhu Jawa Asha | "Dekho Peye Gechi Bari" | Joy Sarkar | Solo |
| 2023 | Kothay Tumi | "Female Version" | Dev Sen | Solo |
| 2023 | Ektu shore boshun | "Nispolok" | Ranajoy Bhattacharya | Arijit Singh |

=== ‌Hindi ===
| Year | Movie | Songs | Music director | Co-singer(s) |
|---|---|---|---|---|
| 2008 | Golmaal Returns | "Tha Kar Ke" | Pritam | Neeraj Shridhar, Akriti Kakkar, Earl, Ind |
| 2008 | Golmaal Returns | "Tha Kar Ke (Remix)" | Pritam | Neeraj Shridhar, Akriti Kakkar, Earl, Ind |
| 2012 | Dangerous Ishhq | "Ishq Mein Ruswaa" | Himesh Reshammiya | Solo |
| 2013 | Raanjhanaa | "Banarasiya" | A. R. Rahman | Shreya Ghoshal, Meenal Jain |
| 2013 | Luv U Soniyo | "Tumsa Nahi Koi" | Vipin Patwa | KK |
| 2014 | Kaanchi: The Unbreakable | "Tu Sab Kuch Re" | Ismail Darbar | Sonu Nigam, Ismail Darbar |
| 2014 | Kaanchi: The Unbreakable | "Koshampa" | Ismail Darbar | Aman Trikha, Sanchita Bhattacharya, Subhash Ghai |
| 2014 | Revolver Rani | "Bol Rahi Hai Payal" | Sanjeev Srivastava | Avi Dutta |
| 2015 | Guru Dakshina | "Jo Hota Hai" | Ismail Darbar | Ismail Darbar |
| 2015 | Prem Ratan Dhan Payo | "Jalte Diye" | Himesh Reshammiya | Vinit Singh, Harshdeep Kaur, Shabab Sabri |
| 2015 | I Love Desi | Dil Ka Baje Ektara | Sharib & Toshi | Sharib Sabri |
| 2015 | I Am 24 | Do Lafzon Ki Hai | Jatin Pandit | |
| 2016 | Do Lafzon Ki Kahani | "Jeena Marna" | Babli Haque | Solo |
| 2017 | Panchlait | "Saajan Saajan" | Kalyan Sen Barat | Javed Ali, Rupankar |
| 2017 | Panchlait | "Pyaar Hai" | Kalyan Sen Barat | Javed Ali |
| 2017 | Single | "Tujhse Milke Ye Baawra" | Shreyash Shandiliya | |
| 2018 | Ilaaka Kishorganj | "Charche Tere" | J Nutan Pankaj | Amit Gupta |
| 2019 | Ye Kaisa Tigdam | "Andhere Mein Rehne Do" | Ismail Darbar | Javed Bashir |
| 2021 | Bansuri | "Nanhi Si" | Debojyoti Mishra | |
| 2022 | Sita Ramam | "O Sita" | Vishal Chandrasekhar | |
| 2022 | Dhoop Chhaav | "Ishq Da Rog" | Melody Box | |

=== Kannada ===
| Year | Movie | Songs | Music director | Co-singer(s) |
|---|---|---|---|---|
| 2016 | Santheyalli Nintha Kabira | "Baare Ninage Naanu" | Ismail Darbar | Sonu Nigam |
| 2016 | Santheyalli Nintha Kabira | "Navu premada huccharu" | Ismail Darbar | Kavita Seth |
| 2016 | Santheyalli Nintha Kabira | "Maneyembodu" | Ismail Darbar | Mohammed Irfan |
| 2016 | Enendu Hesaridali | "Enendu Hesaridali" | Surendra Nath B R | Sandeep Bankeshwar |
| 2016 | Enendu Hesaridali | "Nenapagali Nenneyu" | Surendra Nath B R | Manoj Vasishta |
| 2017 | Hottegagi Genu Battegagi | "Nee Enagee" | Ramachandra Hadpad | solo |
| 2021 | Krishna Talkies | "Manamohana" | Sridhar V Sambhram | Vihan Arya |
| 2021 | Shokiwala | "Ninnannu Nodaliga" | Shridhar V Sambhram | Santhosh Venky |

=== Tamil ===
| Year | Songs | Movie | Music director | Co-singer(s) |
|---|---|---|---|---|
| 2010 | Mandhira Punnagai | "Megam Vandhu Pogum" | Vidyasagar | Madhu Balakrishnan |
| 2011 | Ilaignan | "Mazhayil Kulitha" | Vidyasagar | Karthik |
| 2015 | Darling 2 | "Ni Sa Gari Sa" | Radhan | Naresh Iyer |

=== Telugu ===
| Year | Movie | Songs | Music director | Co-singer(s) |
|---|---|---|---|---|
| 2012 | Uu Kodathara? Ulikki Padathara? | "Anuraagame Haaratulaye" | Bobo Shashi, Vidya Sagar | Karthik |
| 2016 | Pittagoda | "Thiyya Thiyyayi" | Pranam Kamlakhar | solo |
| 2019 | First Rank Raju | "Nuvve Nijam" | Kiran Ravindranath | Solo |
| 2023 | Ala Ninnu Cheri | "Vachadamma Vachadu" | Subhash Anand | Solo |
| 2024 | Siddharth Roy | "Sadha Sadha" | Radhan | Solo |

=== Malayalam ===
| Year | Movie | Songs | Music director | Co-singer(s) |
|---|---|---|---|---|
| 2017 | Theeram | "Minnaminungu" | Afzal Yusuf | Najim Arshad |
| 2022 | Mahaveeryar | "Anurag Yamanam" | Ishaan Chhabra | |
| 2022 | Solamante Theneechakal | "Aanandamo" | Vidyasagar | Abhay Jodhpurkar |

=== Marathi ===
| Year | Movie | Songs | Music director | Co-singer(s) |
|---|---|---|---|---|
| 2016 | Ekk Albela | "Bholi Surat Dil Ke Khote" | C Ramachandra | Vinay Mandke |
| 2016 | Ekk Albela | "Sham Dhale Khidki Tale" | C Ramachandra | Vinay Mandke |
| 2018 | Baban | "Jagnyala Pankha Phutle" | Harsshit Abhiraj | Onkarswaroop |
| 2018 | Baban | "Godi Madhachi" | Onkarswaroop | Onkarswaroop |
| 2018 | Baban | "Shravan Mahina" | Harsshit Abhiraj | Solo |
| 2023 | Pahije Jatiche | "Kasa Asel Te Jag" | anweshaa | anweshaa |
| 2023 | Pahije Jatiche | "Chalalo" | anweshaa | Abhay Jodhpurkar |
| 2023 | Pahije Jatiche | "Duniyadari" | anweshaa | Hrishikesh Ranade |
| 2023 | Pahije Jatiche | "Ti Honar" | anweshaa | Abhay Jodhpurkar |

=== Rajasthani ===
| Year | Movie | Songs | Music director | Co-singer(s) |
|---|---|---|---|---|
| 2016 | Taanko Bhid Gayo | Manzil | Iqbal Darbar | |

=== Nepali ===
| Year | Movie | Songs | Music director | Co-singer(s) |
|---|---|---|---|---|
| | Friends | | Kazi Singh | Udit Narayan |

=== Assamese ===
| Year | Movie | Songs | Music director | Co-singer(s) |
|---|---|---|---|---|
| | | | Debojyoti Mishra | |

=== Bhojpuri ===
| Year | Movie | Songs | Music director | Co-singer(s) |
|---|---|---|---|---|
| 2013 | Lakshman Rekha | Ohane Kahan Jaat Baadu | Satish, Ajay | Alok Kumar |
| 2013 | Lakshman Rekha | Sanjhiya Saverwa | Satish, Ajay | Udit Narayan |

=== Gujarati ===
| Year | Movie | Songs | Music director | Co-singer(s) |
|---|---|---|---|---|
| 2022 | Khedut Ek Rakshak | Dil Na Tarango | Maulik Mehta | |
| 2022 | Saiyaar Mori Re | Chandaliyo | Kedar-Bhargav | Solo |

== Albums ==
- Nachiketa Ebar Safar
- Neel Dariya
- E-pothe Anweshaa
- Priyotomasu
- Nana Range Anweshaa
- Aaradhana (One of several artists)
- Nilathattam (One of several artists)
- Antaranga (One of several artists)
- Ekla Tor – Sarata Din
- Aarzoo (One of several artists)
- Dil Ki Baatein (One of several artists)
- Krishnaruupa (One of several artists), song – "Shreenathji Darshan"
- Lafz Ankahe (Various artists)
- Bollywood Unwind (Various artists)
- Mizaaj-e-Ishq
- Uma Elo
- Tagore for Today
- Mere yaar julahe

== Singles ==
- Tum Sang (Composer: Swapnil Mistry – Nominated for Artists Aloud Best song)
- Sukh Dukh (Composer: Swapnil Mistry, Unreleased)
- ONTARI NE KAANAYYA | DD Anand | Pranam Kamlakhar | anweshaa |
- Masoom Sapney (Composer: Ananjan Chakraborty)
- Kuch thikana nahi (Composer: Abhishek Ray)
- Sukha patta (Composer: Abhishek Ray)
- Raat Din – 2021 (Composer: Ashok Raaj, co-songer: Sujoy Bhowmik)
- Phir kyun bhoola tu insaniyat (one of several artists, Composer: Sandeep-Ashutosh)
- Tere sang (Composer: Vinay Patil)
- Akash hote chai (Composer: Asheq Manzur)
- Kuch baatein yuhin hain na (Composer: Ajay Singha)
- Larzish (Composer: Abhishek Ray, Lyricist: Avinash Tripathi)
- Reshmi dhaage (Composer: Abhishek Ray, Lyricist: Avinash Tripathi)
- Saiyaan re (Composer: Prasun Das)
- Tuzya Vina (Marathi Composed By Prasad Phatak – Award for best singer, Marathi single)
- Sajan ghar aao re (Composition: Prasad Phatak; Lyrics: Sameer Samant)
- Laage buke laage (Composer: Imran Mahmudul)
- Ichhe Kore (Singer: anweshaa; Lyricist: Prabir Mukhopadhyay; Music Direction and Composition: Anjan Majumdar; Music Arrangements: Pt.Debojyoti (Tony) Bose; Sound Recordist: Gautam Basu, Sanjay Ghosh; Studio: Vibration & Resonance Music Video : Milton)
- Manbasiyaan (Singers: anweshaa & Abhishek Ray, Lyrics – Avinash Tripathi)
- Yaadon ke panchhi (Composer: Abhishek ray; Vocals – anweshaa & Abhishek, Lyrics – Manvendra)
- Kontya Kshani Haravati ashya (Marathi Composed By Jeevan Marathe Lyrics: Vaishali Marathe)
- Abol gandh premacha (Singers: anweshaa, Jeevan Marathe; Composition: Jeevan Marathe; Lyrics: Vaishali Marathe)
- Man He Vede Ka Punha (Marathi Composed By Jeevan Marathe Lyrics: Vaishali Marathe Producer : Shrinivas G. Kulkarni)
- Premamruthi Krupanidhi (Composer: Kamlakar Rao, Vocals: anweshaa, Mohan veena: Pt Vishwa Mohan Bhatt, Tabla: Ojas Adhiya, Harmonium: Feroz Khan and other talented artists)
- Saiyaan ree (Singer: anweshaa, Composition – Prasun Das)
- Dushwaari (Vocals: anweshaa & Abhishek Ray, Composition: Abhishek Ray, Lyrics: Avinash Swaroop)
- Aanch Laagi (Singers: anweshaa & Abhishek Ray, Lyrics/composition – Abhishek Ray)
- Kotha roilo (Singer: anweshaa, Composition – Asheq Manzur)
- Ninnu vidachi (Composer: Ashirwad Luke, Vocals: anweshaa)
- Entha madhuram (Composer: KY Madhuram, Vocals: anweshaa)
- Chitthiyon Wala yar (Singer: anweshaa & Abhay Jodhpurkar, Composition – Ajay Singha)
- Naman karu (Composer: Mukesh Jodhwani)
- Kehkasha (Composer: Abhishek Ray, Lyrics: Abhishek Ray)
- Ek Subah (Composer: Ananjan Chakraborty, Lyrics: Anasmita Ghosh)
- Bismil (Composer: Abhishek Ray, Lyrics: Syed Gulrez Abhishek Ray)
- Bhalobasha kare koy (Composer: Sandeep Banerji, Lyrics: Sampa Chatterjee)
- Beintehaan (Composer: Dabbu, Lyrics: Rajiv Dutta)
- Tasavvur (Composer: Abhishek Ray, Lyrics: Avinash Tripathi)
- Tera Mera (Composer: Ananjan Chakraborty, Lyrics: Anasmita Ghosh)
- Yesayya Yesayya ne Mata chalayya (Composer: K Y Ratnam, Lyrics:Prasad Nelapudi)
- Gunj (Composer:Dr. Amit Kamle, Lyrics: Amit Kamle)
- Teri Inayat (Composer: Ulhas V, Raviraj, Lyrics: Raviraj)
- Cheyecho ja dite amay (Composer: Syed Monsoor Raviraj, Lyrics: Ellora Ameen)
- Unnadu Devudu (Composer: K Y Ratnam, Lyrics: KR John)
- Neel Aakash (Composer: Som Chakraborty, Lyrics: Soham Majumdar)
- Padhe Paadana (Composer: Pranam Kamlakar, Lyrics: Joshua Shaik)
- Vadhimpabadina (Composer: Pranam Kamlakar, Lyrics: Anand Tirugulla)
- Aadharinchagarava (Composer: Pranam Kamlakar, Lyrics: Joshua Shaik)
- Jeena (Composer: Som Chakraborty, Lyrics: Priyo Chatterjee)
- Amra Korbo Joy – 2020 (Composer: Joy-Anjan, Lyrics: Traditional)
- Sara Dao – (Composer : Amit Banerjee, Lyricist : Rajiv Dutta)
- Gustakhiyaan – (Music : Som Chakraborty)
- Abol gandha premacha – (Composer: Jivan Marathe, Vaishali Marathe)
- Gumshuda – (Music : Malhar Yash, Lyrics : Malhar Mahavir, vocals : anweshaa)
- Wo Ishq – (Music & lyrics: Abhishek thakur, vocals: anweshaa)
- Ishq mein doob jaunga – (Music: Avishek Majumder, Lyrics: Jairaj Selvan, Singers: KK & anweshaa)
- Wo Kashish – (Music & lyrics: Abhishek thakur, vocals: Javed Ali & anweshaa)
- Boka Ghuri – (Music & lyrics: Prajna Dutta, vocals: anweshaa & Prajna Dutta)
- Brishti – (Music: Shiladitya- Som, Lyrics: Sohum, vocals: anweshaa)
- SHARODIYA SUR – (Music: Ashok Bhadra, Lyrics: Priyo Chatterjee, vocals: anweshaa)
- Krupayu Samadhanamu – (Music: Jonah Samuel, Lyrics, tune: Jasper Kunapo, Vocals: anweshaa)
- Rai Jago – (Traditional.. Arrangement: Sainik Dey, vocals: anweshaa)

== Television songs ==
Anweshaa sang the title tracks of these serials:

| Year | Serial | Music director(s) | Channel | Language |
|---|---|---|---|---|
| 2011–2013 | Keya Patar Nouko | Debojyoti Mishra | Zee Bangla | Bengali |
| 2011 | Binni Dhaner Kho | Debojyoti Mishra | ETV Bangla | Bengali |
| 2011 | Dui Shalik | Joy Sarkar | Aakash Aath | Bengali |
| 2012 | Subhashini | Raja Narayan Deb | Rupasi Bangla | Bengali |
| 2015–2016 | Mohe Rang Do Laal | Adil Prashant | Colors Rishtey | Hindi |
| 2016–2018 | Kusum Dola | Debojyoti Mishra | Star Jalsha | Bengali |
| 2016 | Jeevana chaitra | Karthik Sharma | Disney+ Hotstar | Kannada |
| 2017–2018 | Kundo Phuler Mala | Debojyoti Mishra | Star Jalsha | Bengali |
| 2017–2019 | Andarmahal | Debojyoti Mishra | Zee Bangla | Bengali |
| 2018–2019 | Bajlo Tomar Alor Benu | Debjit Roy | Star Jalsha | Bengali |
| 2019–2021 | Sreemoyee | Debojyoti Mishra | Star Jalsha | Bengali |
| 2019 | Bijoyini | Debjit Roy | Star Jalsha | Bengali |
| 2020–2021 | Kora Pakhi | Debojyoti Mishra | Star Jalsha | Bengali |
| 2020–2022 | Khorkuto | Debojyoti Mishra | Star Jalsha | Bengali |
| 2020–2021 | Harano Sur | Ranajoy Bhattacharjee | Sun Bangla | Bengali |
| 2021 | Desher Maati | Debojyoti Mishra | Star Jalsha | Bengali |
| 2021 | Mehndi Hai Rachne Waali | Shubham Sundaram | Star Plus | Hindi |
| 2021–2022 | Dhulokona | Debojyoti Mishra | Star Jalsha | Bengali |
| 2021 | Rishton Ka Manjha | Shibashish | Zee TV | Hindi |
| 2021 | Zee Rishtey Awards | Aadil Prashant | Zee TV | Hindi |
| 2021 | Nayantara | Aneek Dhar | Sun Bangla | Bengali |
| 2021 | Asha Lata | Soumyajit Sourendro | Sun Bangla | Bengali |
| 2021 | Yeshu | Aadil Prashant | & TV | Hindi |
| 2022 | Shona Roder Gaan | Debjit Roy | Colors Bangla | Bengali |
| 2022–2024 | Saathi | Samidh Mukherjee | Sun Bangla | Bengali |
| 2022–2025 | Anurager Chhowa | Joy Sarkar | Star Jalsha | Bengali |
| 2022–2023 | Meghe Dhaka Tara | Debjit Roy | Sun Bangla | Bengali |
| 2022–2023 | Guddi | Debojyoti Mishra | Star Jalsha | Bengali |
| 2022 | Kashibai Bajirao Ballad | Nishant Raja | Zee TV | Hindi |
| 2023 | Balijhor | Debojyoti Mishra | Star Jalsha | Bengali |
| 2023 | Safed Detergent | Debojyoti Mishra | Naboborsho Adfilm | Bengali |
| 2023 | Mili | Pratik Kundu | Zee Bangla | Bengali |
| 2023 | Love Biye Aaj Kal | Shovan Ganguly | Star Jalsha | Bengali |
| 2023 | Ichhe Putul | Amit Chatterjee | Zee Bangla | Bengali |
| 2023 | Jol Thoi Thoi Bhalobasha | Debojyoti Mishra | Star Jalsha | Bengali |
| 2023 | Tumi Ashe Pashe Thakle | Amit Chatterjee | Star Jalsha | Bengali |
| 2024 | Dui Shalik | Indraadip Dasgupta | Star Jalsha | Bengali |

== Amul STAR Voice of India Chhote Ustaad ==
In 2007–2008, she participated in the junior version of the popular musical reality show Amul STAR Voice of India named Chhote Ustaad. Aishwarya Majmudar was the winner, and Anwesha was the runner-up in the competition.

== After Chhote Ustaad ==
- On 6 May 2008, Anwesha recorded her second playback song for a Bengali film Khela, directed by the Bengali film director Rituparno Ghosh.
- Anwesha got her first break as a commercial playback singer in the film Golmaal Returns (Music Director – Pritam) where she sang for Amrita Arora/Kareena Kapoor.
- She sang the title song for the TV show Waar Parriwar by Gajendra Singh alongside Shaan.
- She will be recording a Bengali Album, which would release during the Pooja.
- Anwesha recorded a song with Planman Motion Pictures in the 2012 romantic comedy I M 24 with music director Jatin Pandit.
- Anwesha also participated in NABC-2009 held at San Jose, California where she delivered soulful numbers with Shaan
- Anwesha Tamil debut with the song called "Megam Vanthu Pogum" (Cloud comes and disappears) from the movie called Mandhira Punnagai (Mandhra of Smile), music by one of the greatest music director Vidhyasagar. For the same music director, she has recorded a new song for the new Tamil movie Ilaignan. The song title goes as Mazhaiyil Kulitha along with Karthik
- She received best female upcoming singer of the year award for the debut Tamil song in music mirchi awards 2010.
- She sang, as promised by Himesh Reshammiya (during "Music Ka Maha Muqabala"), one of the songs of the movie Dangerous Ishhq (Vikram Bhatt 2012).
- Anwesha sang the song "Banarasiya" with Shreya Ghoshal and Meenal Jain from the 2013 film Raanjhanaa with music composed by AR Rahman.
- In 2016, Anwesha made her Kannada debut with the most expected film Santheyalli Nintha Kabira (to be released) where she has sung 3 songs for Ismail Darbar.

== MTV Coke Studio ==
She performed a ghazal "Benaam Khwahishein" at Coke Studio on the fifth episode under the music direction of Papon.

== Collaborations with Abhishek Ray ==
- Kehkasha
- Bismil
- Reshmii dhaagey
- Tasavvur
- Aanch lagi
- Kuch thikana nahi
- Sukha patta
- Dushwari
- Manbasiyaa
- Yaadon ke panchi
- Let it rain
- Larzish

== Awards and nominations ==
She has received the Filmfare Award East and three Mirchi Music Awards.
