= Magic (2021 film) =

2021 Indian Bengali thriller film

- Directed by: Raja Chanda
- Written by: Arnab Bhaumik; Raja Chanda
- Produced by: Suman Sengupta
- Starring: Ankush Hazra; Oindrila Sen; Payel Sarkar
- Edited by: Md. Kalam
- Music by: Dabbu
- Production company: SSG Entertainment
- Release date: 12 February 2021
- Country: India
- Language: Bengali

Magic is a 2021 Indian Bengali language psychological action thriller film co-written and directed by Raja Chanda and produced by Suman Sengupta starring Ankush Hazra, Oindrila Sen, Payel Sarkar.

This film was released under the banner of SSG Entertainment on 12 February 2021.

== Synopsis ==
The story starts with a boy Indra, who is in a melancholic state but loves magic. He has some magical change in his life when he falls in love with a girl Kriti, from his office. After falling in love Indra realises that he had some connection with Kriti in his previous life and the film takes a turn from there.

== Cast ==
- Ankush Hazra as Indrajit "Indra"
- Oindrila Sen as Kriti
- Payel Sarkar
- Debshankar Halder
- Bidipta Chakraborty

== Soundtrack ==
Magic

Soundtrack album by Dabbu
- Released: 23 January 2022
- Recorded: 2021
- Genre: Film soundtrack
- Length: 10:21
- Language: Bengali
- Label: Surinder Films

The background score and the soundtracks are composed by Dabbu and lyrics are penned by Prasenjit Mallik,Raja Chanda And Rajib Dutta.

Track list
No.	Title	Lyrics	Music	Singer	Length
1.	"Hok Na Magic"	Raja Chanda	Dabbu	Anupam Roy	2:46
2.	"Mon Anmone"	Rajib Dutta	Dabbu	Santanu Dey Sarkar; Antara Mitra	2:57
3.	"E Naamey Se Naamey"	Rajib Dutta; Prasenjit Mallik	Dabbu	Shaan; Anwesshaa	4:18
Total length:					10:21
