= Surinder Films =

Indian media company

- Type: Private
- Industry: Entertainment (2001-Present)
- Genre: Entertainment
- Founder: Surinder Singh
- Headquarters: Kolkata, West Bengal, India
- Area served: India
- Key people: Nispal Singh; Surinder Singh
- Products: Television programs, Motion pictures, Addatimes
- Owner: Nispal Singh
- Website: Surinder Films

Surinder Films is an Indian media and entertainment company headquartered in Kolkata, West Bengal. It mainly produces and distributes Bengali films. The production house was created by Surinder Singh in 1970 as a film distribution company. In 1995, it was taken over by his son Nispal Singh. The company has produced more than 70 films, 20 television shows, 50 web series and short films.

Apart from producing and distributing Bengali films, Surinder Films is also in the business of Television content production. The other division of the company includes digital content production for OTT platforms. In 2023, Surinder Films acquired the first Bengali OTT platform of India, Addatimes.

== Films ==
Year	Film	Director(s)	Note
2001	Rakhi Purnima	Anjan Chaudhury	
2001	Jamaibabu Jindabad	Ratan Adhikari	Remake of 1986 Kannada film Anuraga Aralithu
2002	Deva	Sujit Guha	Remake of 2001 Tamil film Dheena
2003	Guru	Swapan Saha	Remake of 1995 Tamil film Baashha
2004	Premi	Ravi Kinagi	Remake of 2002 Telugu film Nee Sneham
2004	Mastan	Ravi Kinagi	Remake of 1999 Hindi film Jaanwar
2005	Dada	T. L. V. Prasad	Remake of 2002 Telugu film Indra
2006	Hero	Swapan Saha	Remake of 2002 Kannada film Appu
2006	Ghatak	Swapan Saha	
2006	Premi No.1	Debu Pattnayak	Remake of 2003 Telugu film Dil
2007	Tiger	Swapan Saha	
2008	Mon Mane Na	Sujit Guha	Remake of Pyar To Hona Hi Tha
2009	Saat Paake Bandha	Sujit Mondal	Remake of 1996 Telugu film Pavitra Bandham
2010	Bolo Na Tumi Aamar	Sujit Mondal	Remake of 2006 Telugu film Happy
2010	Josh	Rabi Kinnagi	Remake of 2005 Telugu film Bhadra
2010	Mon Je Kore Uru Uru	Sujit Guha	
2011	Paglu	Rajiv Kumar Biswas	Remake of 2006 Telugu film Devadasu
2011	Royal Bengal Rahasya	Sandip Ray	
2012	Le Halua Le	Raja Chanda	Remake of 1984 Malayalam film Poochakkoru Mookkuthi and its Hindi version Hungama
2012	Jaaneman	Raja Chanda	Remake of 2010 Tamil film Paiyaa
2012	Paglu 2	Sujit Mondal	Remake of 2011 Telugu film Kandireega
2012	Jekhane Bhooter Bhoy	Sandip Ray	
2013	Loveria	Raja Chanda	Remake of 2009 Telugu film Bumper Offer
2013	Rocky	Sujit Mondal	Remake of 2011 Telugu film Oosaravelli
2013	Rangbaaz	Raja Chanda	Remake of 2007 Telugu film Chirutha
2013	Majnu	Rajiv Kumar Biswas	
2014	Arundhati	Sujit Mondal	Remake of 2009 Telugu film the same name
2014	Chaar	Sandip Ray	
2014	Highway	Sudipto Chattopadhyay	
2014	Khaad	Kaushik Ganguly	
2014	Badshahi Angti	Sandip Ray	
2015	Herogiri	Rabi Kinnagi	Remake of 2013 Telugu film Balupu
2015	Jamai 420	Rabi Kinnagi	The movie resembles Hindi movies like Housefull, Housefull 2, and Bengali movie Bye Bye Bangkok
2015	Besh Korechi Prem Korechi	Raja Chanda	Remake of 2014 Telugu film Loukyam
2015	Parbona Ami Chartey Tokey	Raj Chakraborty	Remake of 2013 Telugu film Uyyala Jampala
2015	Har Har Byomkesh	Arindam Sil	
2016	Power	Rajiv Kumar Biswas	Remake of 2014 Telugu film of the same name
2016	Kelor Kirti	Raja Chanda	Remake of 2002 Tamil film Charlie Chaplin and its Hindi version No Entry
2016	Love Express	Rajiv Kumar Biswas	Remake of 2013 Telugu film Venkatadri Express
2016	Byomkesh Pawrbo	Arindam Sil	Based on the novel, Amrityer Mrityu written by Sharadindu Bandyopadhyay
2017	Tomake Chai	Rajiv Kumar Biswas	Remake of 2011 Kannada film Sanju Weds Geetha
2017	Chhaya O Chhobi	Kaushik Ganguly	
2017	Jio Pagla	Rabi Kinagi	Core story based on the play Joy Maa Kali Boarding; Remake of Biwi Aur Makan which has already been remade in Marathi as Ashi Hi Banwa Banwi, in Kannada as Olu Saar Bari Olu and again in Hindi as Paying Guests
2018	Inspector Notty K	Ashok Pati	Remake of 2013 Punjabi film Jatt & Juliet 2
2018	Honeymoon	Premendu Bikash Chaki	Based on Samaresh Basu's novel which has been adapted in 1975 as Chhutir Phande
2018	Ghare & Baire	Mainak Bhaumik	
2018	Drishtikone	Kaushik Ganguly	
2018	Sultan: The Saviour	Raja Chanda	Remake of 2015 Tamil film Vedalam
2018	Piya Re	Abhimanyu Mukherjee	Remake of 2010 Kannada film Krishnan Love Story
2018	Girlfriend	Raja Chanda	Remake of 2015 Telugu film Cinema Choopistha Mava
2018	Bagh Bandi Khela	Raja Chanda, Sujit Mondal, Haranath Chakraborty	Television film
2019	Jamai Badal	Rabi Kinagi	Remake of 2012 Punjabi film Carry On Jatta
2019	Baccha Shoshur	Biswarup Biswas	
2019	Googly	Abhimanyu Mukherjee	
2019	Jyeshthoputro	Kaushik Ganguly	
2019	Kidnap	Raja Chanda	
2019	Bhootchakra Pvt. Ltd.	Haranath Chakraborty	Loosely inspired by 2017 Telugu film Anando Brahma
2019	Teko	Abhimanyu Mukherjee	
2019	Sagardwipey Jawker Dhan	Sayantan Ghosal	A sequel to Jawker Dhan and the second film
2020	Borunbabur Bondhu	Anik Dutta	
2020	Rawkto Rawhoshyo	Soukarya Ghosal	
2020	Love Story	Rajiv Kumar Biswas	Remake of 2014 Tamil film Amara Kaaviyam
2021	Tumi Ashbe Bole	Sujit Mondal	
2021	Miss Call	Rabi Kinagi	Remake of 2015 Kannada film Krishna Leela
2021	Flyover	Abhimanyu Mukherjee	Remake of 2016 Kannada film U Turn
2021	Bony	Parambrata Chatterjee	
2022	Toke Chhara Banchbo Na	Sujit Mondal	
2023	Kaberi Antardhan	Kaushik Ganguly	
2023	Love Marriage	Premendu Bikash Chaki	
2023	Tenida and Co.	Sayantan Ghosal	
2023	Ardhangini	Kaushik Ganguly	
2023	Tarokar Mrityu	Haranath Chakraborty	
2024	Bhootpori	Soukarya Ghosal	
2024	Alaap	Premendu Bikash Chaki	
2024	Nayan Rahasya	Sandip Ray	Based on Satyajit Ray's Feluda story, Nayan Rahasya
2024	Ajogyo	Kaushik Ganguly	Ajogyo marks Prosenjit Chatterjee and Rituparna Sengupta's 50th Film
2024	Shastri	Pathkrit Basu	
2024	Khadaan	Soojit Dutta	Jointly produced in collaboration with Dev Entertainment Ventures
2025	Sonar Kellay Jawker Dhan	Sayantan Ghosal	
2025	Sharthopor	Annapurna Basu	
2025	Mitin: Ekti Khunir Sandhaney	Arindam Sil	
2026	Aajo Ardhangini	Kaushik Ganguly	A sequel to Ardhangini

== Television ==
Year	TV Series	Network
2009–2011	Dhonni Meye	Star Jalsha
2010–2011	Mukhosh Manush	Star Jalsha
2012–2013	Ghore Pherar Gaan	Star Jalsha
2014–2016	Rajjotok	Zee Bangla
2014–2016	Kiranmala	Star Jalsha
2015–2016	Aponjon	Colors Bangla
2015–2016	Esho Maa Lakshmi	Zee Bangla
2016–2018	Bhakter Bhogobaan Shri Krishna	Star Jalsha
2016	Rudrani	Colors Bangla
2016–2017	Raadha	Zee Bangla
2017–2018	Roopkatha	Colors Bangla
2017–2018	Mayar Badhon	Star Jalsha
2017–2018	Jamai Raja	Zee Bangla
2017–2019	Seemarekha	Zee Bangla
2017–2019	Saat Bhai Champa	Zee Bangla
2018	Om Namah Shivay	Star Jalsha
2019	Arabbya Rajani	Colors Bangla
2019	Nojor	Star Jalsha
2019–2020	Ekhane Aakash Neel Season 2	Star Jalsha
2019–2020	Netaji	Zee Bangla
2019–2021	Beder Meye Jyotsna	Sun Bangla
2019–2022	Mahapeeth Tarapeeth	Star Jalsha
2020–2021	Harano Sur	Sun Bangla
2020–2021	Bhelpuri Pyare	Dangal TV
2021–2022	Mompalok	Sun Bangla
2021	Shree Krishna Bhakto Meera	Star Jalsha
2021–2022	Mon Mane Na	Colors Bangla
2021–2022	Mou Er Bari	Colors Bangla
2021–2022	Joy Jagannath	Colors Bangla
2022	Laalkuthi	Zee Bangla
2022	Bodhisattwar Bodhbuddhi	Zee Bangla
2022– 2023	Bikram Betal	Star Jalsha
2022– 2023	Alor Thikana	Sun Bangla
2022– 2024	Sohag Chand	Colors Bangla
2023	Meyebela	Star Jalsha
2023– 2024	Ram Krishna	Colors Bangla
2023– 2024	Ramprasad	Star Jalsha
2024	Mongolmoyee Maa Shitala	Sun Bangla
2024	Bhaktir Sagar	Star Jalsha
2024– 2025	Uraan	Star Jalsha
2025	Putul TTP	Sun Bangla
2025– 2026	Bedeni Jotsnar Omor Prem	Zee Bangla Sonar
2025– 2026	SIT Bengal	Zee Bangla Sonar
2025– Present	O Mor Dorodiya	Star Jalsha

== Mahalaya ==
Year	Name	Channel	Mahisasurmardini
2016	Matrirupena	Zee Bangla	Indrani Halder
2017	Rupang Dehi Jayang Dehi	Zee Bangla	Indrani Halder
2018	Shaktiruepna	Zee Bangla	Ditipriya Roy
2021	Nabarupe Mahadurga	Colors Bangla	Koel Mallick
2022	Debi Doshomohabidya	Colors Bangla	Rituparna Sengupta
2023	Ya Devi Sarvabhutesu	Star Jalsha	Koel Mallick
2024	Ranong Dehi	Star Jalsha	Koel Mallick
2025	Matrirupena Sanhasthita	Star Jalsha	Koel Mallick
2026	Asubhonashini Trinayani	Zee Bangla	Ankita Mallick
