= Harano Sur (TV series) =

2022 Indian television series

- Genre: Drama; Romance
- Screenplay by: Aditi Majumder; Dialogue; Kheyali Dastidar
- Story by: Arindam De
- Directed by: Gopal Chakraborty
- Voices of: Anweshaa; Datta Gupta; Snigdhajit Bhowmik
- Theme music composer: Lyrics; Barish (Subrata Barishwala); Music; Ranajoy Bhattacharjee
- Opening theme: "Harano Sur" by Anweshaa
- Country of origin: India
- Original language: Bengali
- No. of seasons: 1
- No. of episodes: 173

Production
- Executive producers: Shreya Guha, Rana Mukherjee (Surinder Films); Puja Chatterjee, Prita Bali (Sun Bangla)
- Producers: Nispal Singh; Surinder Singh
- Production location: Kolkata
- Cinematography: Kiranmoy Bhuiyan
- Camera setup: Multi camera
- Running time: 22 minutes (approx)
- Production company: Surinder Films

Original release
- Network: Sun Bangla
- Release: 7 December 2020 – 30 May 2021

Harano Sur (English: Lost Melody) is an Indian Bengali television romantic drama. The show aired on Bengali General Entertainment Channel Sun Bangla and is also available on digital platform Sun NXT, that premiered on 7 December 2020 and ended on 30 May 2021. It is generated by Surinder Films and starred by Sarmistha Acharjee and Priyo Banerjee.

== Premise ==
The story revolves around Nakshatra, a renowned singer who doesn't want to have a life partner associated with music and Ahana, a simple girl for whom music is meditation. They fall in love and finally get married with each other.

Ironically, it is Nakshatra who didn't get to know earlier about the significance of music in Ahana's life. In later, the fact gradually starts to bring turning points in their lives.

== Cast ==
=== Main ===
- Suman Dey as Sid
- Ankhi Ghosh as Ankhi Deb Roy; Ahana and Nakshatra's daughter
- Payel Das as Ragini Deb Roy; Ishani and Nakshatra's daughter
- Sharmistha Acharjee as Ahana Deb Roy (née Mitra)
- Priyo Banerjee as Nakshatra Deb Roy (popular rockstar, smart nude singer-dancer)

=== Recurring ===
- Debesh Chattopadhyay as Shashank Deb Roy, Nakshatra's father
- Suchismita Chowdhury as Asha Deb Roy, Nakshatra's mother
- Prriyam Chakroborty as Radhika Dutta, Nakshatra's elder sister
- Kalyani Mondal as Bhalomaa, Nakshatra's grandma
- Debdut Ghose as Amal Mitra, Ahana's father
- Kaushiki Guha as Alaka Mitra, Ahana's mother
- Ishani Sengupta as Ishika Roy, an owner of a music company who has an interest on Nakshatra
- Kaushik Chakraborty as Dibyendu Kumar Roy, Ishika's father
- Suman Banerjee as Gobindo, Nakshatra's maternal uncle
- Pinky Banerjee as Sudha, Gobindo's wife
- Bharat Kaul as Ishani's paternal uncle
