= Black (2015 Bengali film) =

- Theatrical poster
- Directed by: Raja Chanda
- Written by: Manjil Banerjee
- Screenplay by: Manjil Banerjee
- Story by: Manjil Banerjee
- Produced by: Rana Sarkar; Kamal Mohammad Kibria
- Starring: Soham Chakraborty; Bidya Sinha Mim
- Cinematography: Gopi Bhagat
- Edited by: Md.Kalam
- Production companies: Dag Creative Media; Kibria Films; Viacom 18 Motion Pictures
- Release dates: 27 November 2015 (India); 4 December 2015 (Bangladesh)
- Countries: India; Bangladesh
- Language: Bengali

Black is a 2015 Indian Bengali-language vigilante action crime film directed by Raja Chanda, and starring Soham Chakraborty and Bangladeshi actress Bidya Sinha Saha Mim in lead roles. The film was jointly produced by Viacom 18 Motion Pictures and Dag Creative Media. It was released in India on 27 November 2015, and in Bangladesh on 4 December 2015.

The film revolves around a man named Biltu, who takes vengeance against those who framed his father (a police officer) with false charges and as a result the latter commits suicide to get rid of this humiliation.

== Cast ==
- Soham Chakraborty as Bullet / Biltu
- Bidya Sinha Saha Mim as Tina
- Ashish Vidyarthi as encounter specialist Biru Panday
- Kharaj Mukherjee as Anwar Bhai
- Rudranil Ghosh as Roni
- Rajatava Dutta as Samrat Sarkar, a corrupt businessman, main antagonist
- Amit Hasan as DGP Dilip Chatterji
- Kanchan Mullick
- Biswanath Basu
- Barkha Sengupta in an item number song "Moyna Cholat Cholat" (special appearance)
- Kushal Chakraborty as Biltu's father, ACP Kollol Ghosh
- Manjil Banerjee as Auto, informer and spy of Bullet
- Rebeka Rouf as Anwar's wife

== Soundtrack ==
Black

Soundtrack album by Dabbu and Rajputra Chanda
- Released: 21 November 2015
- Recorded: 2015
- Genre: Feature film soundtrack
- Length: 17:02
- Label: T-Series
- Producer: Rana Sarkar

Dabbu, Ajoy chronology
Jamai 420 (2015)	Black (2015)	Mental (2016)

Rajputra Chanda chronology
Black (2015)

All lyrics are written by Raja Chanda, Prasen; all music is composed by Dabbu, Rajputra Chanda.

Track listing
No.	Title	Lyrics	Music	Artist(s)	Length
1.	"Halka Halka"	Prasen	Dabbu	Shaan, Anweshaa	5:18
2.	"Dhip Dhip Buker Majhe"	Raja Chanda	Ajoy	Nakash Aziz	3:05
3.	"Moyna Cholat Cholat"	Raja Chanda	Dabbu	Akriti Kakkar	3:52
4.	"Kono Ek Nilche Pori"	Raja Chanda	Rajputra Chanda	Monali Thakur, Hridoy Khan	4:45
Total length:					16:20
