= Photo Finish =

A photo finish is a photo or video taken at the finish line of a sporting race when multiple competitors cross the finishing line at nearly the same time.

Photo finish may also refer to:

- Photo-Finish, the seventh studio album by Irish musician Rory Gallagher
- Photo Finish (novel), a detective novel by Ngaio Marsh
- Photo Finish (Wednesday Theatre), a 1965 Australian play
- Photo Finish Records, an independent record label located in New York City, United States
- "Photo Finish" (The Apprentice), a 2008 reality television episode
- "Photo Finish" (Dexter's Laboratory), a 1997 animated television episode
- "Photo Finish" (Press Gang), a 1989 children's television episode
- "Photo Finish" (Prison Break episode), a 2007 drama television episode
- "Photo Finish", an episode of the Indian web series Picasso
- Photo Finish (play), a play by Peter Ustinov
- Photo finishing, the chemical means by which photographic film and paper are treated after photographic exposure to produce a negative or positive image
