= Force (2014 film) =

- Force 2014 first look
- Directed by: Raja Chanda
- Written by: Anindya Bose (Screenplay & Dialogues); G. N. R. Kumaravelan
- Produced by: Prosenjit Chatterjee; Nitin Keni
- Starring: Prosenjit Chatterjee; Arpita Pal; Arya Dasgupta; Joyjit Banerjee; Tathagata Mukherjee; Debranjan Nag; Sudipta Ballav; Jayanta Hore
- Cinematography: Gopi Bhagat
- Edited by: Saptarishi Mukherjee
- Music by: Saptarishi Mukherjee
- Production companies: Essel Vision Productions; NIdeas Creations & Productions Pvt Ltd.
- Distributed by: Shree Venkatesh Films
- Release date: 7 November 2014
- Running time: 135 Minutes
- Country: India
- Language: Bengali

Force is a Bengali-language action drama film directed by Raja Chanda and produced under the banners of Essel Vision Productions and NIdeas Creations & Productions Pvt Ltd. The film features actors Prosenjit Chatterjee and Arpita Pal in the lead roles. It is a remake of 2013 Tamil superhit Haridas.

== Plot ==
Force is a new commercial Bengali movie, based on the love and relationship of a father and a son. Arjun (Prosenjit Chatterjee) is an encounter specialist police officer whose goal is to eradicate both crime and criminals from the society. He lost his wife during the birth of his son, Abhimanyu. His son is autistic and has neurodevelopmental disabilities.

== Cast ==
- Prosenjit Chatterjee as ACP Arjun Roy - Encounter Specialist.
- Arpita Pal as Labanya
- Tathagata Mukherjee as Shivaji Rakshit
- Ena Saha
- Kamaleshwar Mukherjee as Police Commissioner
- Arya Dasgupta as Young Abhimanyu Roy
- Aryann Bhowmik as Adult Abhimanyu Roy
- Joyjit Banerjee Krishna
- Debranjan Nag
- Sudipta Ballav as Adinath, leader of coal mafia gang
- Jayanta Hore
- Sumit Ganguly as Debu Barman - sports committee member

== Soundtrack ==
Force

Soundtrack album by Saptarishi Mukherjee
- Released: 2014
- Genre: Feature film soundtrack
- Producers: Essel Vision Productions; NIdeas Creations & Productions Pvt Ltd.

Track	Song	Singer(s)	Duration (min:sec)	Music	Lyricist
1	"Take It Easy"	Usha Uthup	2:42	Saptarishi Mukherjee	Prosen
2	"Palabi Aye"	Sonu Nigam	4:16	Saptarishi Mukherjee	Prosen
3	"Police"	Timir Biswas & Ujjaini	3:18	Saptarishi Mukherjee	Prosen
4	"Force"	Rupam Islam	2:38	Saptarishi Mukherjee	Prosen
