= Kidnap (2019 film) =

2019 Bengali film by Raja Chanda

- Official Poster
- Directed by: Raja Chanda
- Written by: N. K. Salil
- Screenplay by: N. K. Salil
- Story by: N. K. Salil
- Produced by: Nispal Singh
- Starring: Dev; Rukmini Maitra; Chandan Sen; Ashim Roy Chowdhury; Buddhadeb Bhattacharya
- Cinematography: Souvik Basu
- Edited by: Md. Kalam
- Music by: Jeet Gannguli
- Production company: Surinder Films
- Distributed by: Surinder Films
- Release date: 5 June 2019
- Running time: 127:26 minutes
- Country: India
- Language: Bengali

Kidnap is a Bengali-language action thriller film directed by Raja Chanda. The film was produced by Nispal Singh under the banner of Surinder Films. It features Dev, Rukmini Maitra, and Chandan Sen in the lead roles. This movie was released on 5 June 2019. It was initially titled as Saudaa.

== Cast ==
- Dev as police officer Dev
- Rukmini Maitra as Meghna
- Chandan Sen as Tapas Bose
- Kamaleshwar Mukherjee as Editor
- Kanchan Mullick as MLA Shanku Deb
- Buddhadeb Bhattacharya as CBI officer
- Sanjib Sarkar as Police Officer
- Shahidur Rahman as Bhaskar, the leader of women trafficking
- Sriparna Roy as Tapas' daughter, Trisha Bose
- Prantik Banerjee as Bhaskar's henchman
- Ashim Roy Chowdhury as Meghna's uncle.
- Rajat Malakar
- Soumyadeep Banerjee

== Soundtrack ==
Kidnap

Soundtrack album by Jeet Gannguli
- Released: 2019
- Recorded: 2018
- Studio: Surinder Films
- Genre: Feature film soundtrack
- Length: 14:45
- Label: Surinder Music
- Producer: Nispal Singh

Jeet Gannguli chronology
Jamai Badal (2019)	Kidnap (2019)	Bibaho Obhijaan (2019)

Singles from Kidnap
- 1. "Oi Dakche Aakash" Released: 20 April 2019; 2. "Ami Tomake Bhalobasi" Released: 2 May 2019; 3. "Monta Katha Sonena" Released: 21 May 2019; 4. "Ektu Jayga Dena" Released: 30 May 2019

All lyrics are written by Raja Chanda & Ritam Sen; all music is composed by Jeet Gannguli.

Track listing:
No.	Title	Lyrics	Singer	Length
1.	"Oi Dakche Aakash"	Raja Chanda	Pawandeep	4:33
2.	"Ami Tomake Bhalobashi"	Raja Chanda	Jubin Nautiyal, Rap by: Parry Gripp	3:06
3.	"Monta Katha Sonena"	Raja Chanda	Goldie Sohel & Palak Muchhal	4:02
4.	"Ektu Jayga Dena"	Ritam Sen	Armaan Malik	3:04
Total length:				14:45
