= Pahije Jatiche =

- Theatrical release poster
- Directed by: Kabbadi Narendra Babu
- Written by: Kabbadi Narendra Babu; Uma Kulkarni (dialogues)
- Based on: Pahije Jatiche by Vijay Tendulkar
- Produced by: Mallikarjun N. Gajre
- Starring: Sayaji Shinde; Vikram Gajre; Sanjana Kale
- Cinematography: M. B. Allikatti
- Edited by: Harish Komme
- Music by: Anweshaa
- Production company: Gajre Films
- Distributed by: August Entertainment
- Release date: 4 August 2023
- Running time: 152 minutes
- Country: India
- Language: Marathi

Pahije Jatiche (lit. 'Wanted, of Our Caste Only') is a 2023 Indian Marathi-language drama film, based on Vijay Tendulkar's Pahije Jatiche. It is directed by Kabbadi Narendra Babu, also provide screenplay and story, while dialogues are written by Uma Kulkarni. The music is composed by Anweshaa, making her debut in Marathi film industry with the film. The film starring Sayaji Shinde, Sanjana Kale, Vikram Gajre, Shushant Koli, Amir Tadwalkar, Pushpa Rathod, Dilip Ahire, Nagnath Salve and Baghirathibai Kadam.

== Plot ==
An epic tale of a young, aimless man discovering reason and purpose via the connection he forges with his community after being hired as a tutor at a nearby tuition centre.

== Cast ==
- Sayaji Shinde
- Sanjana Kale
- Vikram Gajre
- Baghirathibai Kadam
- Shushant Koli
- Amir Tadwalkar
- Pushpa Rathod
- Dilip Ahire
- Nagnath Salve

== Production ==
The film is based on the play Pahije Jatiche. It was written by famous playwright Vijay Tendulkar taking the inspiration from B. R. Ambedkar's Vachayala Shika, Vichar Karayala Shika Aani Mahatwache Mhanje Prashna Vicharala Shika. Actor Sayaji Shinde is in the lead role in the film, alongside Vikram Gajare, Sanjana Kale and Bagirathibai Kadam are playing the pivotal roles.

== Release ==
The trailer was released on 15 July 2023, and film was theatrically released on 4 August 2023 in Maharashtra.

== Soundtrack ==
The music and background score is provided by Anweshaa, marks her debut in Marathi cinema.

== Reception ==
Film information called the direction of the film 'dull' and said that the cinematography and choreography are also weak.
