= Esho Maa Lokkhi =

2015 Indian television series

- Genre: Drama; Mythology
- Created by: Surinder Films
- Written by: Barun; Susnato; Saswati; Somnath
- Directed by: Anup Chakraborty
- Starring: Pratyusha Paul; Rupsha Mukhopadhyay; Joyeeta Goswami; Sargami Rumpa
- Composers: Kalika Prasad Bhattacharya; Debjit Roy
- Country of origin: India
- Original language: Bengali
- No. of episodes: 324

Production
- Producers: Surinder Singh; Nispal Singh
- Production location: Kolkata
- Camera setup: Multi-camera
- Running time: 22 minutes
- Production company: Surinder Films

Original release
- Network: Zee Bangla
- Release: 23 November 2015 – 30 October 2016

Esho Maa Lokkhi is a Bengali television mythological Soap opera that premiered on 23 November 2015 and aired on Zee Bangla up to 30 October 2016. It was produced by Surinder Films and starred Pratyusha Paul/Rupsha Mukhopadhyay as main female protagonist and Joyeeta Goswami as main female antagonist.

== Cast ==
- Pratyusha Paul / Rupsha Mukhopadhyay as Lakshmi
- Prithviraj Banerjee as Vishnu
- Shreyasi Samanta as Saraswati
- Joyeeta Goswami as Alakshmi
- Tanuka Chatterjee
- Rumpa Das
- Subrata Guha Roy as Brahma
- Diya Mukherjee as Monjuri
- Sananda Basak
- Lovely Maitra as Togor
- Arkajyoti Paul Chaudhury as Shiva
- Sanchari Mondal
- Sumanta Mukherjee as Durvasa
