= Le Halua Le =

- Promotional poster
- Directed by: Raja Chanda
- Screenplay by: N.K. Salil
- Produced by: Shree Venkatesh Films
- Starring: Mithun Chakraborty; Soham Chakraborty; Payel; Hiran
- Music by: Jeet Gannguli
- Release date: 13 April 2012
- Running time: 125 minutes
- Country: India
- Language: Bengali

Le Halua Le is a 2012 Indian Bengali-language action comedy film directed by Raja Chanda. Jointly produced by Shrikant Mohta and Nispal Singh under their respective banners of Shree Venkatesh Films and Surinder Films, the screenplay and dialogues of the film were by N. K. Salil. It stars Mithun Chakraborty, Soham Chakraborty, Paayel Sarkar, Hiran Chatterjee and Laboni Sarkar in lead roles. The movie is a remake of the Malayalam film Poochakkoru Mookkuthi directed by Priyadarshan.

== Cast ==
- Mithun Chakraborty as Harshabardhan Banerjee
- Soham Chakraborty as Rahul
- Hiran as Suvojeet/Suvo
- Payel Sarkar as Sonali
- Aritra Dutta Banik as Dipu
- Kharaj Mukherjee as Gobindo
- Kanchan Mullick as Langcha
- Subhasish Mukherjee as Madhusudan, Harshabardhan's servant
- Laboni Sarkar as Sonali Banerjee, Harshabardhan's wife
- Kamalika Banerjee as Rahul's mother
- Rajat Ganguly as Rahul's father
- Sumit Ganguly as Goon
- Shantilal Mukherjee as Police Inspector
- Locket Chatterjee as Gobindo's wife
- Rajatava Dutta as Sona Da MLA

== Soundtrack ==
Le Halua Le

Soundtrack album by Jeet Gannguli
- Released: 13 April 2012
- Recorded: 2011
- Genre: Feature film soundtrack
- Language: Bengali
- Label: SVF
- Producer: Shree Venkatesh Films

Jeet Gannguli chronology
| 100% Love (2012) | Le Halua Le (2012) | Jaaneman (2012) |

Singles from Le Halua Le
- 1. "Darling O Amar Darling" Released: 16 Mar 2012; 2. "Le Halua Le Title Track" Released: 25 Mar 2012; 3. "Love You Love You" Released: 4 Apr 2012; 4. "Chupi Chupi" Released: 9 Apr 2012

All lyrics are written by Raja Chanda; all music is composed by Jeet Gannguli.

| No. | Title | Singer(s) | Length |
|---|---|---|---|
| 1. | "Le Halua Le Title Track" | Bappi Lahiri, Priyanka Vaidya | 3:09 |
| 2. | "Darling O Amar Darling" | Jeet Gannguli, Monali Thakur | 2:20 |
| 3. | "Chupi Chupi" | Mohit Chauhan, Shreya Ghoshal | 3:02 |
| 4. | "Love You Love You" | Kunal Ganjawala | 3:32 |
