= Mon Jaane Na =

2019 Indian romantic thriller film

- Theatrical release poster
- Directed by: Shagufta Rafique
- Written by: Shagufta Rafique
- Screenplay by: Shagufta Rafique
- Story by: Shagufta Rafique
- Produced by: Shrikant Mohta; Mahendra Soni
- Starring: Yash Dasgupta; Mimi Chakraborty
- Cinematography: Ravi Walia
- Edited by: Sanglap Bhowmik
- Music by: Dabbu; Lincon
- Production company: Shree Venkatesh Films
- Distributed by: Shree Venkatesh Films
- Release date: 21 March 2019
- Running time: 116 minutes
- Country: India
- Language: Bengali

Mon Jaane Na is a 2019 Indian Bengali language, romantic thriller film directed by Shagufta Rafique and produced by Shrikant Mohata and Mahendra Soni under the banner of SVF. The film starring Yash Dasgupta, Mimi Chakraborty and Rajdeep Gupta follows the love story of Amir and Pari. This is the debut Bengali film of Shagufta Rafique as director. The film was released in theatres on 21 March 2019, coinciding with Holi festival.

== Synopsis ==
Amir is a young, lonely man who earns his living through taxi driving. Seeing him alone, his friend advises him to get married. Amir seeks help from the local maulvi who introduces him to a shy, orphan girl, Pari. He falls in love with her at first sight and they get married. After marriage, Pari comes across certain secrets of Amir and she goes missing. For two years Amir frantically searches for her throughout the city being a taxi driver. One day he discovers her outside a hotel in an unconscious state. However, Pari is no longer her demure self but has transformed into a reckless drug addict and gone into prostitution.

== Cast ==
- Yash Dasgupta as Amir
- Mimi Chakraborty as Pari
- Shataf Figar as Murad Bhai
- Rajdeep Gupta
- Badsha Moitra
- Shankar Chakraborty as Police Officer

== Soundtrack ==
Mon Jaane Na

Soundtrack album by Dabbu & Lincon
- Released: 12 March 2019
- Recorded: 2018
- Studio: Music Room Studio
- Genre: Feature film soundtrack
- Length: 13:38
- Language: Bengali
- Label: SVF
- Producers: Dabbu; Lincon

The soundtrack of the film is composed by Dabbu & Lincon while lyrics are written by Prasen.

Track listing
No.	Title	Music	Singer(s)	Length
1.	"Keno Je Toke"	Dabbu	Raj Barman	5:02
2.	"Amar Aguner Chhai"	Lincon	Raj Barman	5:34
3.	"Keno Je Toke (Reprise)"	Dabbu	Mimi Chakraborty	3:02
Total length:				13:38
