= Katakuti (TV series) =

2022 Indian crime thriller series

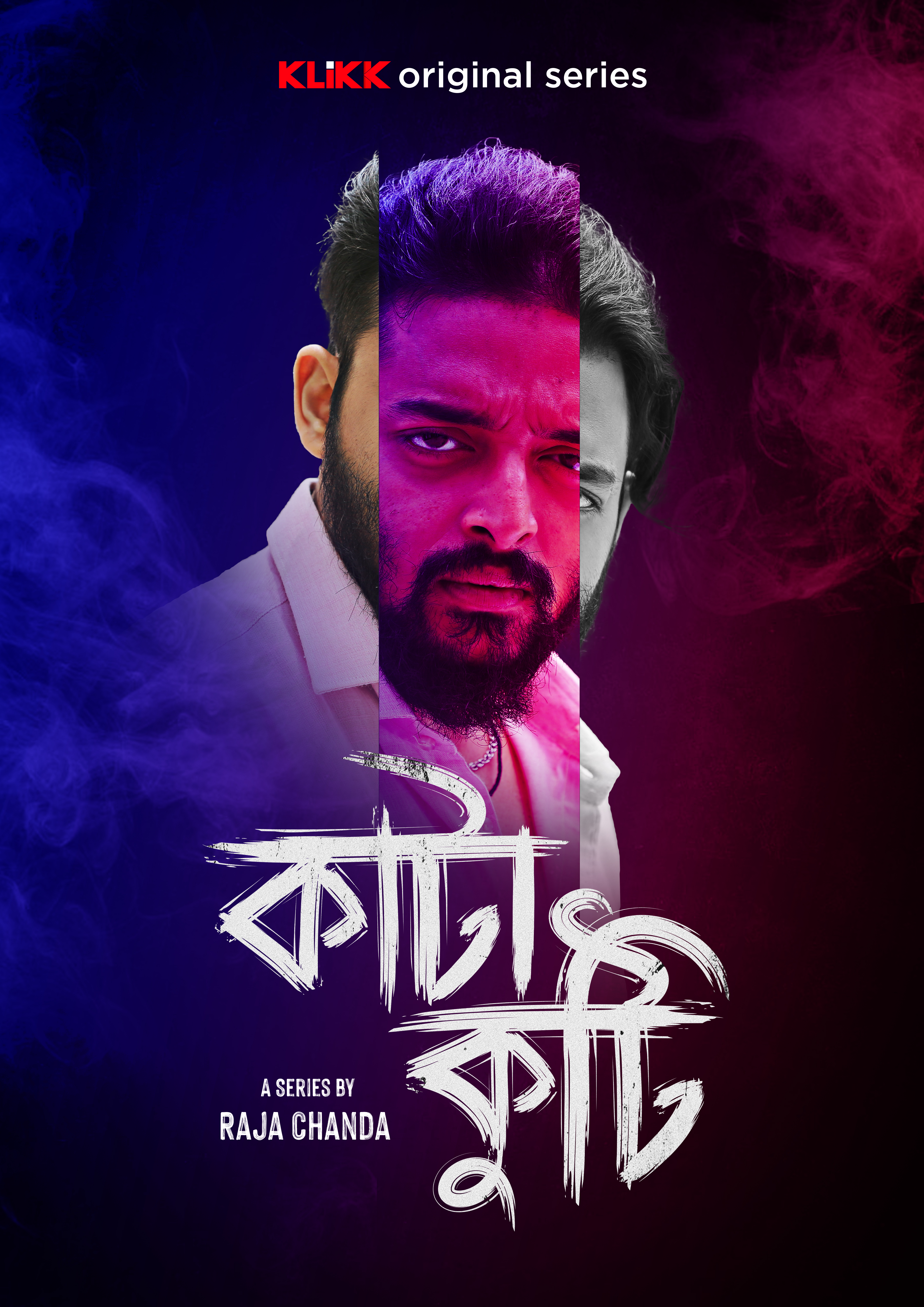
- Written by: Arnab Bhaumik
- Directed by: Raja Chanda
- Starring: Sourav Das, Manasi Sengupta, Paean Sarkar, Devtanu, Abhijit Guha and Sirsha Rakshit
- Country of origin: India
- Original language: Bengali
- No. of seasons: 1
- No. of episodes: 6

Original release
- Release: 25 March 2022

Katakuti is a 2022 Indian Bengali language crime and thriller web series directed by Raja Chanda and written by Arnab Bhaumik.

The web series is produced under Raja Chanda Films, Angel Digital and Ediview. Sourav Das, Manasi Sengupta, Devtanu, Paean Sarkar, Abhijit Guha and Sirsha Rakshit are in the mail role in the web series.

== Synopsis ==
Aditya, a shy young man, and Kaushani are set to get married when a tragic catastrophe prevents it. Aditya, who is devastated, must accept the loss of his sweetheart. Kousani was slain after being gang-raped. He learns about the three criminals responsible for the heinous crime, which leaves him devastated. One of them was a close family friend of Kousani's. Aditya, a typically reserved youngster, undergoes a drastic transformation and sets out to exact cruel retribution on Kousani and her family.

== Cast ==
- Sourav Das
- Manasi Sengupta
- Paean Sarkar
- Devtanu
- Abhijit Guha
- Sirsha Rakshit
- Biplab Bandopadhyay
- Buddhadeb Bhattacharya
- Rajdip Ghosh

== Episodes ==
No.	Title	Directed by	Original release date
1	"Starting From Zero"	Raja Chanda	25 March 2022
The Mukherjees are eager to marry off their son Aditya. Matchmaker Kamal is also at it. In the midst of all of this chaos, Aditya and Smriti meet. Even if they don't end up getting married, they remain lifelong friends.
2	"Phool Panjika"	Raja Chanda	25 March 2022
Phool is Aditya's pet name! His nuptials to Kaushani, a female, are finally scheduled. Each enjoys the other. Everyone is content.
3	"The Victim"	Raja Chanda	25 March 2022
Aditya visits Kaushani's aunt to meet her before getting married but has the shock of his life. His fiancee was brutally killed. Who committed this vile crime?
4	"The Transition"	Raja Chanda	25 March 2022
Aditya decides to tackle the law on his own. Vicky is no more. The innocent youngster is transformed into this vengeful figure by the circumstances of life.
5	"The Chase"	Raja Chanda	25 March 2022
Aditya goes to the police and tells them everything. He asserts that he has dealt with all of the defendants and that he was aware of the identity of the killer of his fiancée.
6	"Black Rose"	Raja Chanda	25 March 2022
The information is shared with the police. The killers' actions, punishment, and treatment at the hands of Aditya. He understood that he had stolen his fiancé's justice because Aditya had not received it.

== Reception ==
Katakuti received mixed to positive reviews from critics.
