= Besh Korechi Prem Korechi =

2015 Indian Bengali film

- Theatrical release poster
- Directed by: Raja Chanda
- Written by: N. K. Salil
- Screenplay by: N. K. Salil
- Story by: Sridhar Seepana
- Produced by: Shrikant Mohta; Nispal Singh
- Starring: Jeet; Koel
- Cinematography: Shailesh Awashthi
- Edited by: Md. Kalam
- Music by: Jeet Gannguli
- Production companies: Shree Venkatesh Films; Surinder Films
- Distributed by: Shree Venkatesh Films
- Release date: 17 July 2015
- Country: India
- Language: Bengali

Besh Korechi Prem Korechi is a 2015 Indian Bengali language action comedy film directed by Raja Chanda and produced jointly by Shrikant Mohta, Mahendra Soni and Nispal Singh under the banners of Shree Venkatesh Films and Surinder Films.

The film features Jeet, Koel, Kharaj Mukherjee, Puneet Issar and Ashish Vidyarthi in lead roles.

== Cast ==
- Jeet as Aditya
- Koel as Rai
- Kharaj Mukherjee as Nepal Das, taxi driver
- Puneet Issar as Raghav Sinha, a gangster and an industrialist
- Ashish Vidyarthi as Dibakar (Rai's elder brother)
- Shataf Figar as Deva, Dibakar's younger brother (Rai's Brother)
- Sumit Ganguly as Mehboob
- Biswajit Chakraborty as Prabhu (Aditya's Father)
- Tulika Basu as Aditya's mother
- Parijat Chakraborty as Madhushree Das
- Vivaan Ghosh as Bhaskar
- Subhashish Mukherjee as Tab Shastri
- Supriyo Dutta as Kanai Da
- Trina Saha as Rai's friend
- Mousumi Saha
- Koena Mitra as Kajal

== Soundtrack ==
Besh Korechi Prem Korechi

Soundtrack album by Jeet Gannguli
- Released: 2015
- Recorded: 2014
- Genre: Feature film soundtrack
- Length: 13:55
- Language: Bengali
- Label: Surinder Films
- Producers: Shrikant Mohta; Nispal Singh

Jeet Gannguli chronology
Herogiri (2015)	Besh Korechi Prem Korechi (2015)	Ki Kore Toke Bolbo (2016)

Singles from Besh Korechi Prem Korechi
- 1. "Besh Korechi Prem Korechi (Title Track)" Released: 27 June 2015; 2. "Tor Ek Kothaye" Released: 3 July 2015; 3. "Oi Tor Mayabi Chokh" Released: 10 July 2015

All lyrics are written by Raja Chanda & Prasen (Prasenjit Mukherjee); all music is composed by Jeet Gannguli.

Track listing
No.	Title	Lyrics	Singer(s)	Length
1.	"Besh Korechi Prem Korechi (Title Track)"	Raja Chanda	Shaan & Akriti Kakkar	4:18
2.	"Tor Ek Kothaye"	Prasen (Prasenjit Mukherjee)	Arijit Singh	4:52
3.	"Oi Tor Mayabi Chokh"	Prasen (Prasenjit Mukherjee)	Jeet Gannguli & Shreya Ghoshal	4:23
Total length:				13:55
