= Raja Chanda =

Indian film director

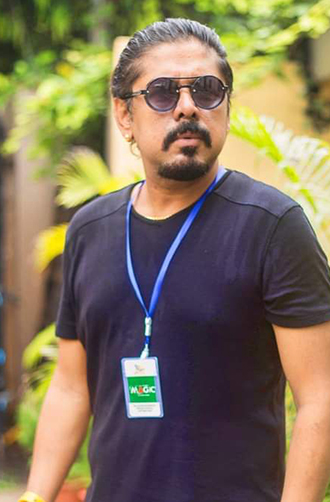
- Chanda in May 2014
- Born: July 7, 1970 (age 56); West Bengal, India
- Occupation: Director
- Years active: 2010–present
- Spouse: Paean Sarkar
- Children: Rajputra Chanda
- Parent(s): Mira Chanda; Deb Kumar Chanda

Raja Chanda is an Indian film director who concentrates on Bengali language film and commercial ad films. He is one of the leading advertising film makers in Kolkata and has made 450+ ad films. His filmworks include Challenge 2, Le Halua Le, Rangbaaz, Savings Account, Magic and Target: The Final Mission.

== Filmography ==
=== As director ===
Denotes films that have not yet been released

Year	Film	Cast	Notes
2010	Target: The Final Mission	Joy; Sayantika; Mithun Chakraborty	Loosely based on Zanjeer
2012	Le Halua Le	Mithun Chakraborty; Soham Chakraborty; Hiran; Payel Sarkar	Remake of Poochakkoru Mookkuthi and its Hindi version Hungama
2012	Jaaneman	Soham Chakraborty; Koel Mallick	Remake of Paiyaa
2012	Challenge 2	Dev; Pooja Bose	Remake of Dookudu
2013	Loveria	Soham Chakraborty; Pooja Bose	Remake of Bumper Offer
2013	Rangbaaz	Dev; Koel Mallick	Remake of Chirutha
2014	Bachchan	Jeet; Aindrita Ray; Payel Sarkar	Remake of Vishnuvardhana
2014	Force	Prosenjit Chatterjee; Arpita Pal	Remake of Haridas
2015	Besh Korechi Prem Korechi	Jeet; Koel Mallick	Remake of Loukyam
2015	Black	Soham Chakraborty; Bidya Sinha Mim	
2015	Midnapore Mighties Anthem Song	Dev; Sayantika Banerjee; Nusrat Jahan; Joy and More.	Bengal Celebrity League]
2016	Kelor Kirti	Dev; Jisshu Sengupta; Ankush; Mimi Chakraborty; Koushani Mukherjee; Nusrat Jahan; Sayantika Banerjee	Remake of No Entry which itself was remake of Charlie Chaplin
2017	Amar Aponjon	Soham Chakraborty; Subhashree Ganguly; Priyanka Sarkar; Aindrita Ray	Remake of Autograph
2018	Sultan: The Saviour	Jeet; Bidya Sinha Mim; Priyanka Sarkar	Remake of Vedalam
2018	Girlfriend	Bonny Sengupta; Koushani Mukherjee	Remake of Cinema Choopistha Mava
2018	Bagh Bandi Khela	Jeet; Sayantika Banerjee; Soham Chakraborty; Srabanti Chatterjee; Prosenjit Chatterjee, Rittika Sen	Television film
2019	Kidnap	Dev; Rukmini Maitra	
2019	Beporowa	Roshan; Bobby	Remake of Bruce Lee: The Fighter
2020	Harano Prapti	Soham Chakraborty; Tanushree Chakraborty; Payel Sarkar; Uday Pratap Singh; Ayoshi Talukdar	Zee5 Release
2021	Magic	Ankush; Oindrila Sen	
2021	Ajob Premer Golpo	Bonny Sengupta; Srabanti Chatterjee	Zee5 Release
2022	Savings Account	Ankush Hazra; Sayantika Bannerjee	Zee5 Release
2022	Amrapali	Bonny Sengupta	Zee5 Release
2022	Katakuti (web series)	Sourav Das (actor); Manasi Sengupta; Paean Sarkar; Devtanu	Klikk Release
2023	Bhoy	Ankush Hazra; Nusraat Faria	Zee5 Release
2023	Biye Bibhrat	Parambrata Chattopadhyay; Abir Chatterjee; Lahoma Bhattacharjee	
2023	Picasso (web series)	Tota Roy Chowdhury; Sourav Das; Srijla Guha; Roja Paramita	Klikk Release
2025	Chandrabindoo	Ankush Hazra; Oindrila Sen	
2025	Bibhishon (web series)	Soham Majumdar; Debchandrima Singha	Zee5 release; Remake of Vilangu
2025	Police	Tota Roy Chowdhury; Pean Sarkar	

=== As lyricist ===
Denotes films that have not yet been released

Year	Title	Songs	Record label	Composer
2010	Target: The Final Mission	Jum Jum Ja		Jeet Gannguli
2012	100% Love	It's 100% Love	Shree Venkatesh Films; Grassroot Entertainment Pvt. Ltd	Jeet Gannguli
2012	100% Love	Yeh Sala Dil Hai(with Sandip Nath)	Shree Venkatesh Films; Grassroot Entertainment Pvt. Ltd	Jeet Gannguli
2012	Le Halua Le	"All Songs"	Shree Venkatesh Films	Jeet Gannguli
2012	Jaaneman	Disco Nachaibo	Shree Venkatesh Films; Surinder Films	Jeet Gannguli
2012	Jaaneman	Jaaneman Title Song	Shree Venkatesh Films; Surinder Films	Jeet Gannguli
2012	Challenge 2	Police Chorer Preme Poreche	Shree Venkatesh Films	Jeet Gannguli
2012	Challenge 2	Elo Je Maa	Shree Venkatesh Films	Jeet Gannguli
2013	Rocky	Rocky Bhai Title Song	Shree Venkatesh Films; Surinder Films	Jeet Gannguli
2013	Rangbaaz	Oh Madhu	Shree Venkatesh Films; Surinder Films	Jeet Gannguli
2013	Rangbaaz	Tui Amar Hero	Shree Venkatesh Films; Surinder Films	Jeet Gannguli
2014	Bangali Babu English Mem	Dol Duluni	Shree Venkatesh Films	Dabbu
2014	Game	Game-Title Track	Reliance Entertainment	Jeet Gannguli
2014	Bachchan	All Songs	Reliance Entertainment] Grassroot Entertainment Pvt. Ltd	Jeet Gannguli
2015	Herogiri	Maria; Panga; Janemon	Shree Venkatesh Films	Jeet Gannguli
2015	Besh Korechi Prem Korechi	Besh Korechi Prem Korechi (Title Track)	Shree Venkatesh Films; Surinder Films	Jeet Gannguli
2015	Black	Dhip Dhip Buker Majhe; Kono Ek Nilche Pori	Viacom18 Motion Pictures; Dag Creative Media	Rajputra Chanda
2015	Black	Halka Halka; Moyna Cholat Cholat	Viacom18 Motion Pictures; Dag Creative Media	Dabbu
2016	Kelor Kirti	Darling, Love Me	Shree Venkatesh Films; Surinder Films	Dev Sen
2016	Power	Missed Call, Chakum Chukum	Shree Venkatesh Films	Jeet Gannguli
2016	Abhimaan	Selfie Le Na Re	Grassroot Entertainment Pvt. Reliance Entertainment	Suddho Roy
2016	Where Do We Go From Here?	"Where Do We Go From Here?/Ke Tui Bol"	Timeless London	JusZonin (Lyan Roze & X11 Twlve); Nish
2017	Chaamp	Jaya Tomari	Zee Music Bangla	Jeet Gannguli
2017	Amar Aponjon	Chol Khunji; Amar Ja Kichu Kotha	SVF Music	Dolan Mainak
2017	Dekh Kemon Lage	Menoka, Let's Dance Kolkata	Zee Music Bangla	Jeet Gannguli
2017	Dhat Teri Ki	Dhat Teri Ki (Title Song)	Jaaz Multimedia; SVF Entertainment	Dabbu
2017	Bolo Dugga Maiki	Dugga Ma(with Prasen)&(Priyo Chattopadhyay)	Shree Venkatesh Films, Jaaz Multimedia	Arindom Chatterjee
2018	Inspector Notty K	Inspector Notty K - Title Track	Grassroot Entertainment Pvt. Ltd; Jaaz Multimedia	Suddho Roy
2018	Sultan: The Saviour	Masha Allah	Jeetz Filmworks; Surinder Films	Savvy
2018	Sultan: The Saviour	Mon Tor Hoyeche	Jeetz Filmworks; Surinder Films	Suddho Roy
2018	Hoichoi Unlimited	Sujon Majhi Re	Dev Entertainment Ventures	Savvy
2018	Hoichoi Unlimited	Oh Baby	Dev Entertainment Ventures	Savvy
2018	Girlfriend	All Songs	Surinder Films	Jeet Gannguli
2018	Bagh Bandi Khela	Mahi Re	Surinder Films	Jeet Gannguli
2019	Kidnap	Oi Dakche Aakash	Surinder Films	Jeet Gannguli
2019	Kidnap	Ami Tomake Bhalobashi	Surinder Films	Jeet Gannguli
2019	Kidnap	Monta Katha Sonena	Surinder Films	Jeet Gannguli
2019	Beporowa	Beporowa Title Song	Jaaz Multimedia	Dabbu
2019	Beporowa	Ghum Ghum Adore (ঘুম ঘুম আদরে)	Jaaz Multimedia	Dabbu
2019	Beporowa	Khati Sona (খাঁটি সোনা)	Jaaz Multimedia	Dabbu
2021	Magic	"Hok Na Magic"	Surinder Films	Dabbu
