= Girlfriend (2018 film) =

2018 Indian Bengali film by Raja Chanda

- Theatrical release poster
- Directed by: Raja Chanda
- Written by: Trinadha Rao Nakkina
- Screenplay by: N.K. Salil
- Story by: Trinadha Rao Nakkina
- Produced by: Nispal Singh
- Starring: Bonny; Koushani; Bharat Kaul; Kanchan Mullick; Atul Kulkarni; Ashish Vidyarthi
- Cinematography: Murali Y Krishna
- Edited by: MD Kalam
- Music by: Jeet Gannguli
- Production company: Surinder Films
- Release date: 2 November 2018 (Kolkata)
- Country: India
- Language: Bengali

Girlfriend is a 2018 Bengali romantic-family comedy film, directed by Raja Chanda and produced by Nispal Singh under the banner of Surinder Films. The official poster of the film was released on 10 August. The official trailer was released on 11 October 2018.

== Cast ==
- Bonny Sengupta as Uttam Kumar
- Koushani Mukherjee as Suchitra, Uttam's love interest
- Bharat Kaul as Kamal Mitra, Deputy Secretary, Health Ministry
- Kanchan Mallick as Bus conductor
- Jayashree mukherjee kaul as Suchitra's mother
- Biswajit Chakraborty as Dr. Utpal Dutta
- Shankar Chakraborty as Uttam's father

== Soundtrack ==
Girlfriend

Soundtrack album by Jeet Gannguli
- Released: 2018
- Recorded: 2018
- Studio: Surinder Films
- Genres: Soft Rock, Featured Film Music, Rock
- Label: Surinder Films
- Producers: Mahendra Soni, Nispal Singh, Allan Alo, Debojit Sengupta

Jeet Gannguli chronology
Piya Re (2018)	Girlfriend (2018)	Bagh Bandi Khela (2018)

Singles from Girlfriend
- 1. "Girlfriend Title Track" Released: 22 August 2018; 2. "Aalto Chhuye" Released: 3 September 2018; 3. "Bin Tere Sanam" Released: 15 October 2018; 4. "Mon Kharap E Bristi" Released: 23 October 2018

Girlfriend(2018) film's 3 songs were composed by Jeet Gannguli and 1 song was composed by Rupam Islam.

All lyrics are written by Raja Chanda.

No.	Title	Music	Singer(s)	Length
1.	"Girlfriend Title Track"	Rupam Islam	Rupam Islam	3:31
2.	"Aalto Chhuye"	Jeet Gannguli	Yasser Desai, Aakanksha Sharma	4:02
3.	"Bin Tere Sanam"	Jeet Gannguli	Jubin Nautiyal	3:12
4.	"Mon Kharap E Bristi"	Jeet Gannguli	Soham Naik	3:54
