= Rangbaaz (2013 film) =

2013 Indian action thriller film

- Rangbaaz
- Directed by: Raja Chanda
- Written by: Puri Jagannadh
- Produced by: Nispal Singh
- Starring: Dev; Koel
- Cinematography: Shailesh Awasthhi
- Edited by: Ravi Ranjan Maitra
- Music by: Jeet Gannguli
- Production company: Surinder Films
- Distributed by: Surinder Films; Jalsha Movies Production
- Release date: 11 October 2013
- Running time: 140:14 minutes
- Country: India
- Language: Bengali
- Budget: ₹5 crore
- Box office: ₹9 crore

Rangbaaz is an Indian Bengali language vigilante action film directed by Raja Chanda and produced under the banner of Surinder Films. The film stars Dev and Koel in lead roles. It is a remake of the Telugu film Chirutha

== Plot ==
An auto driver sees Lucky Bhai murdering a journalist. He managed to capture Lucky Bhai along with his henchman and held them until the police arrived. Afterwards, he returns home to his wife and son, Raj. Unfortunately, Lucky Bhai and his henchmen break into their house that night. The auto driver is killed, his wife was severely injured but Raj survives uninjured. Raj's mother is in a critical condition but he and his uncle don't have enough money to pay for her operation. The local mafia leader's son has committed murder and offers Raj a deal. In order to pay for his mother's surgery, Raj has to go to prison for the crime.

Twelve years later, Raj is released from prison and finds out that his mother had died. He falls in love with Madhurima who lives with her father. Raj plans to go to Bangkok to join a travel agency recommended by his uncle. Coincidentally, Madhurima and her friends also arrive in Bangkok as tourists. Raj is one of the tour guides. Vicky and his henchmen are bothering Madhurima. Raj saves her, fighting the goons. Few days later, Vicky & his henchmen see Madhurima again and Raj fights them once again. Raj and Madhurima use a water bike to escape. They get stuck in the middle of the sea when their water bike runs out of gas. When Madhurima wakes up after a slumber, she sees an island that is a little far away. Raj and Madhurima swim to the island.

Raj expresses his love to Madhurima. Her father and her friends thought that she has been kidnapped by Raj, as they find out Raj was in prison for 12 years. He arranges helicopters to search for Madhurima. Raj sees one helicopter in the sky, but Madhurima doesn't want anyone to find them. She tells Raj that she loves him too but her father would never let her marry him. Raj didn't expect her to fall in love with him. He reveals that he came to Bangkok to kill Lucky Bhai, who is a notorious international criminal with his present base in Bangkok. Raj tells Madhurima that Vicky is none other than Lucky Bhai's brother. In Bangkok, Raj tried to kill Lucky Bhai but he escaped & stopped coming to Bangkok. By the time Raj finishes telling his foiled plot to kill Lucky Bhai, men in black suits come and start to beat him. Just then Madhurima's father comes in a helicopter. Seeing her dad she runs to him and tells him not to hit Raj as he did not kidnap her but saved her. So, her father tells the goons to leave him. But when Madhurima tells him that she loves him, her father tells the goons to kill him. They hit Raj on the head, he falls down and they go away. Then a member of the company for which Raj works, searching for him on a boat, finds him and takes him back. Later, a heated argument takes place between Madhurima and her father and she runs away to Raj.

Then Madhurima's father calls her and Raj receives it. He takes her back to her father. Madhurima's father surprised Raj by showing that Raj's mother is alive and his uncle had lied to him about his mother's death. Madhurima's father exchanged Raj's mother for Madhu; and Raj was grateful to him.

Meanwhile, Lucky Bhai sees the pictures of Raj and Madhurima on television, which was part of Madhurima's father's efforts to find her, and recognizes Raj as the person who tried to kill him. Vicky then kidnaps Madhurima and Raj goes to rescue her. Lucky Bhai tries to find out who Raj is and why he wants to kill him, but after Raj's unwillingness to reveal, Lucky Bhai beats him up. Then after Raj insists upon seeing Madhurima. Lucky Bhai brings Madhurima along with Vicky. In a fight, Raj kills Vicky and all of Lucky Bhai's henchmen. In the meantime, Lucky Bhai tries to kill Madhurima but Raj manages to save her. He then beats up Lucky Bhai and knocks him to the ground.

Raj and Madhurima come towards each other, and just as it seems like everything is just about finished, Lucky Bhai comes to attack both Madhurima and Raj with a knife. Raj evades the knife, grabs it from Lucky Bhai and forces Lucky Bhai to the ground. Raj then tells Lucky Bhai that "Lucky had killed an auto driver 12 years back", and this is when Lucky Bhai realises that Raj is the son of that auto driver. Raj tells Lucky Bhai that his only goal in life was to kill Lucky Bhai and then Raj kills him in the same way which Lucky Bhai had killed his father.

== Cast ==
- Dev as Raj, Madhu's love interest
- Koel as Madhurima aka Madhu, Raj's love interest
- Rajatava Dutta as Madhurima's father
- Rahul Dev as Lakshman Mitra aka Lucky Bhai, a dreaded goon
- Kharaj Mukherjee as Haridas
- Mousumi Saha as Aparna, Raj's mother
- Supriyo Dutta as Police Commissioner Ajay
- Surajit Sen as Vicky
- Priyanka Rati Pal as Madhu's friend
- Partho Sarathi Chakraborty as Raj's friend
- Biswanath Basu as Bobby, owner of Indo Bangkok Travel Agency
- Kushal Chakraborty as Raj's father
- Pradip Dhar as Raj's uncle
- Prasun Gain as Sardi

== Production ==
=== Filming ===
The film was mostly filmed in Bangkok and the islands across Thailand. Few parts were shot in West Bengal and Hyderabad. Parts of the song sequences have been filmed in various picturesque locales of Europe like at the Roman Colosseum in Rome and in Vatican City. Dev and Koel did their stunts themselves, under the supervision of the action choreographer Alan Amin.

== Soundtrack ==
Rangbaaz

Soundtrack album by Jeet Gannguli
- Released: 2 October 2013
- Recorded: 2013
- Genre: Soundtrack
- Length: 27:05
- Label: Surinder Films
- Producer: Nispal Singh

Jeet Gannguli chronology
| Boss: Born to Rule (2013) | Rangbaaz (2013) | Chirodini Tumi Je Amar 2 (2014) |

Singles from Rangbaaz
- 1. "Tui Amar Hero" Released: 28 Nov 2018; 2. "O Madhu" Released: 29 Nov 2018; 3. "Ki Kore Toke Bolbo" Released: 30 Nov 2018; 4. "Benche Theke Labh Ki Bol" Released: 1 Dec 2018; 5. "Love You Soniyo" Released: 1 Dec 2018; 6. "Dishahin Chokher Khoje" Released: 3 Dec 2018

The music of the film has been composed by Jeet Gannguli. The lyrics have been penned by Prasen and Raja Chanda.

Track listing
| No. | Title | Lyrics | Singer(s) | Length |
|---|---|---|---|---|
| 1. | "Oh Madhu" | Raja Chanda | Benny Dayal and Monali Thakur | 3:10 |
| 2. | "Tui Amar Hero" | Raja Chanda | Mika Singh and Akriti Kakkar | 3:29 |
| 3. | "Ki Kore Toke Bolbo" | Prasen | Arijit Singh | 3:24 |
| 4. | "Love You Soniyo" | Prasen | Zubeen Garg and Monali Thakur | 4:23 |
| 5. | "Benche Theke Labh Ki Bol" | Prasen | Arijit Singh | 4:12 |
| 6. | "Dishahin Chokher Khoje" | Prasen | Manomoy Bhattacharya | 2:31 |
| 7. | "Korishna Rangbaazi" | Prasen | Benny Dayal and Neeti Mohan | 1:08 |
| Total length: | | | | 27:05 |

== Controversy ==
The makers were accused of completely copying certain scenes from a Rakesh Roshan directorial Kaho Naa... Pyaar Hai. The film has many scenes which are exactly similar to the water boat escape and unknown island survival scenes present in the 2000 Hindi film, starring Hrithik Roshan and Ameesha Patel.
