= Picasso (TV series) =

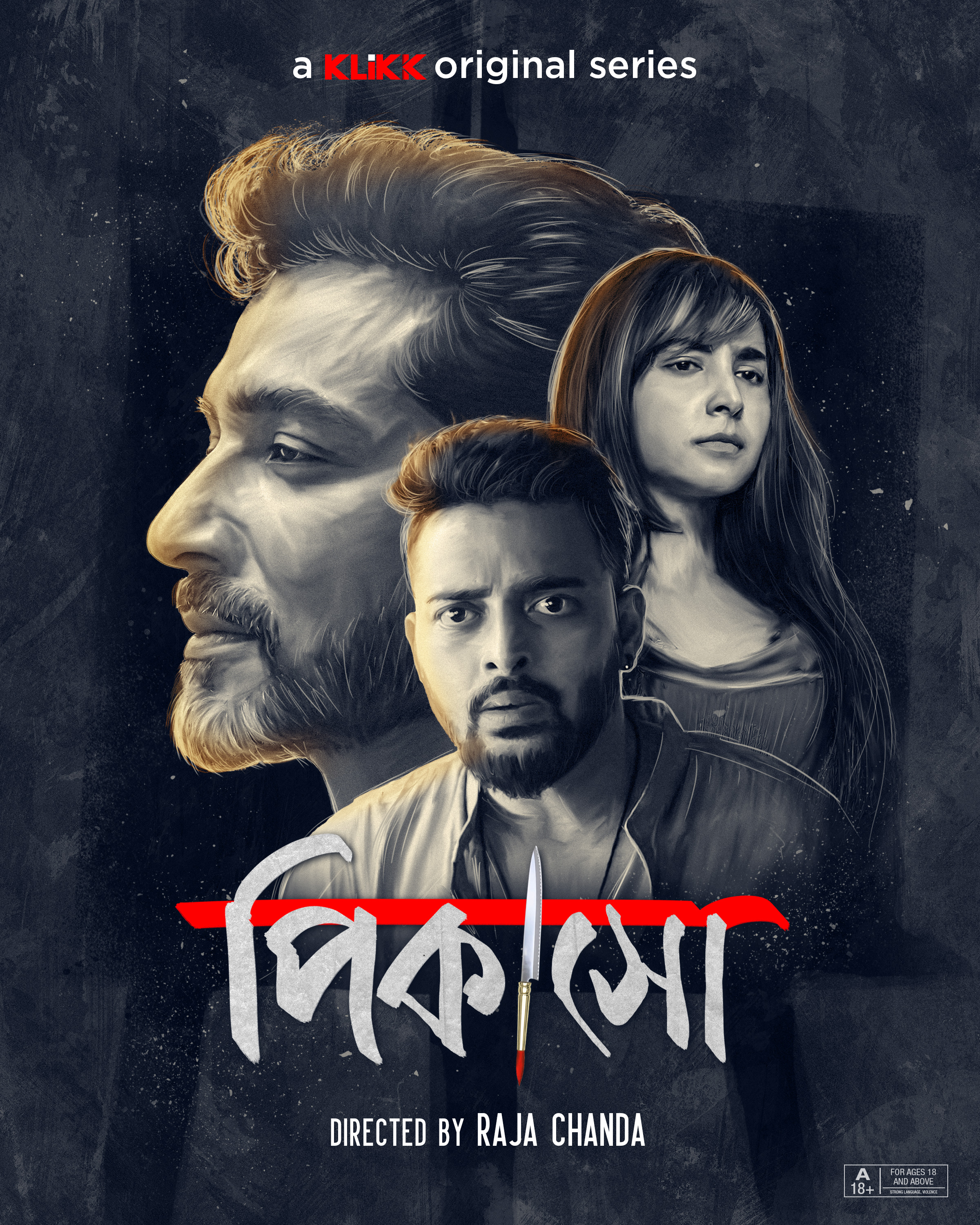
- Genre: Thriller, Crime
- Written by: Arnab Bhaumik
- Directed by: Raja Chanda
- Starring: Tota Roy Chowdhury; Sourav Das; Srijla Guha; Roja Paramita Dey; Deboprasad Halder
- Country of origin: India
- Original language: Bengali
- No. of seasons: 1
- No. of episodes: 5

Production
- Cinematography: Soumyadipta Vicky Guin

Original release
- Release: 30 November 2023

Picasso is a 2023 Indian Bengali-language crime and thriller web series directed by Raja Chanda. The series is written by Arnab Bhaumik.

The series starring Tota Roy Chowdhury, Sourav Das, Srijla Guha, Roja Paramita Dey, and Deboprasad Halder.

== Synopsis ==
Journalist Shreya gets disturbing information about a Picasso painter in North Calcutta from her friend Vikram. Picasso received widespread praise for his portraits, but they appear to be linked to unexplained deaths. While investigating a Picasso-related murder, Shreya discovers another death connected to one of the artist's models. It becomes clear as she looks further that Picasso is connected to the killings. There is suspense about the mystery as Shreya's search for the truth collides with Picasso's dark intentions, causing the story to take unexpected turns.

== Cast ==
- Tota Roy Chowdhury as Picasso
- Sourav Das as Vikram
- Srijla Guha as Shreya
- Roja Paramita Dey
- Deboprasad Halder

== Episodes ==
No.	Title	Directed by	Original release date
1	"Artist-lane"	Raja Chanda	30 November 2023
Journalist Shreya is under constant pressure at work to find new stories. Picasso is an artist who lives in Artist Lane and has won numerous national awards. Her friend Vikram tells a fascinating story about Picasso. Picasso has spent the last few years isolating himself in his home despite his achievements.
2	"Portrait"	Raja Chanda	30 November 2023
Picasso, aka Palash Mukherjee, shared a home with his spouse Harida, a housekeeper. He chooses to paint his first portrait one day. He creates a portrait of Harida. Though it worked out wonderfully, destiny has other plans. Harida passed away under mysterious circumstances a few days later. When he chooses to paint his own wife Anuradha months later, she also meets a similar end. In an interview with Shreya, Picasso tells her the entire story of what happened.
3	"Shaktirupeno Sansthita"	Raja Chanda	30 November 2023
Picasso and Anuradha were deeply in love. Picasso intended Sakthirupeno Sansthita, his wife's portrait, to be his most exclusive work of art. However, history repeats itself, and Anuradha passed away a short while after her painting was completed.
4	"Fanka Canvas"	Raja Chanda	30 November 2023
When Vikram's assistant discovers that he has a hidden agenda for bringing Shreya to Picasso's studio, he begins to blackmail him. In contrast, Vikram intends to use blackmail on Picasso and is prepared with a backup plan in case he refuses to comply. Shreya was not aware that all of these people were heading to meet Picasso for the final day's interview.
5	"Photo finish"	Raja Chanda	30 November 2023
Shreya had only gone to Picasso to report on a murder-related incident. However, there was another incident around this same period in which Picasso had drawn the death of a rising model. Shreya began learning a lot about this story as she investigated it. Picasso is actually the one responsible for the killings. It's unclear, though, why he carried out the killings, Shreya's reasons for chasing Picasso, and the turn the narrative takes.
