= Nispal Singh =

Indian film producer

Nispal Singh Rane
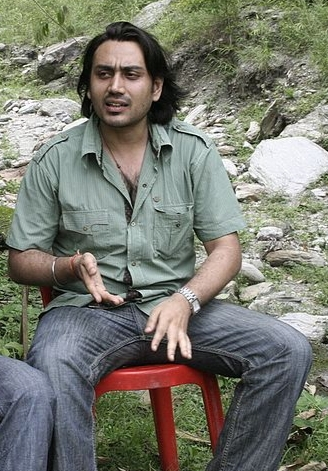
- Singh in 2008
- Born: Kolkata, West Bengal, India
- Occupation: Film producer
- Organization: Surinder Films
- Spouse: Koel Mallick (m. 2013)
- Children: 1 son 1 daughter
- Father: Surinder Singh

Nispal Singh Rane is an Indian producer in Tollywood. He produces films and serials under his banner Surinder Films. He is married to Koel Mallick, a Bengali actress.

== Filmography ==
=== Films ===
Denotes films that have not yet been released

Year	Film	Producer	Surinder Films	Language
2001	Jamaibabu Jindabad	No	Yes	Bengali
2002	Deva	No	Yes	Bengali
2006	Hero	No	Yes	Bengali
2007	Tiger	Yes	Yes	Bengali
2008	Mon Mane Na	No	Yes	Bengali
2009	Premi No.1	No	Yes	Bengali
2009	Saat Paake Bandha	No	Yes	Bengali
2010	Bolo Na Tumi Aamar	No	Yes	Bengali
2010	Josh	No	Yes	Bengali
2010	Mon Je Kore Uru Uru	No	Yes	Bengali
2011	Paglu	No	Yes	Bengali
2012	Le Halua Le	No	Yes	Bengali
2012	Paglu 2	Yes	Yes	Bengali
2012	Jaaneman	Yes	No	Bengali
2013	Loveria	No	Yes	Bengali
2013	Rocky	No	Yes	Bengali
2013	Rangbaaz	Yes	Yes	Bengali
2013	Majnu	No	Yes	Bengali
2014	Arundhati	Yes	Yes	Bengali
2014	Chaar	Yes	Yes	Bengali
2014	Highway	Yes	Yes	Bengali
2014	Khaad	No	Yes	Bengali
2014	Badshahi Angti	Yes	Yes	Bengali
2015	Herogiri	Yes	Yes	Bengali
2015	Besh Korechi Prem Korechi	Yes	Yes	Bengali
2015	Jamai 420	Yes	Yes	Bengali
2015	Parbona Ami Chartey Tokey	No	Yes	Bengali
2015	Har Har Byomkesh	No	Yes	Bengali
2016	Power	Yes	Yes	Bengali
2016	Kelor Kirti	Yes	Yes	Bengali
2016	Love Express	Yes	Yes	Bengali
2016	Byomkesh Pawrbo	Yes	Yes	Bengali
2017	Jio Pagla	Yes	Yes	Bengali
2017	Tomake Chai	No	Yes	Bengali
2017	Chaya O Chobi	Yes	Yes	Bengali
2018	Inspector Notty K	No	Yes	Bengali
2018	Honeymoon	No	Yes	Bengali
2018	Ghare And Baire	No	Yes	Bengali
2018	Drishtikone	No	Yes	Bengali
2018	Sultan: The Saviour	Yes	Yes	Bengali
2018	Piya Re	Yes	Yes	Bengali
2018	Girlfriend	Yes	Yes	Bengali
2018	Bagh Bandi Khela	No	Yes	Bengali
2019	Baccha Shoshur	Yes	Yes	Bengali
2019	Kidnap	Yes	Yes	Bengali
2019	Bhootchakra Pvt. Ltd.	Yes	Yes	Bengali
2021	Miss Call	Yes	Yes	Bengali

=== Web series ===
Year	Title	Producer	Surinder Films	Language	Platform	Notes
2020	Lalbazaar	Yes	Yes	Bengali	Zee5	
