= Poochakkoru Mookkuthi =

1984 Indian film by Priyadarshan

- Promotional poster
- Directed by: Priyadarshan
- Screenplay by: Priyadarshan
- Based on: Charles Dickens's play The Strange Gentleman
- Produced by: Sanal Kumar; G. Suresh Kumar
- Starring: Shankar; Mohanlal; Menaka; M. G. Soman; Nedumudi Venu; Sukumari; Jagathy Sreekumar; Kuthiravattam Pappu; Baiju Santhosh; C. I. Paul
- Cinematography: S. Kumar
- Edited by: N. Gopalakrishnan
- Music by: M. G. Radhakrishnan
- Production company: Sooryodaya Creations
- Distributed by: Dinny Films
- Release date: 17 March 1984
- Running time: 150 minutes
- Country: India
- Language: Malayalam

Poochakkoru Mookkuthi (transl. A nose-ring for the cat) is a 1984 Indian Malayalam-language screwball comedy film written and directed by Priyadarshan (in his directorial debut). The film features an ensemble cast that includes Shankar, Mohanlal, Menaka, M. G. Soman, Nedumudi Venu, C. I. Paul, Sukumari, Jagathy Sreekumar, Kuthiravattam Pappu, Sreenivasan and Baiju Santhosh.

Poochakkoru Mookkuthi marks the directorial debut of Priyadarshan, the first collaboration of Priyadarshan and Mohanlal as director and actor. Their frequent collaborator M. G. Sreekumar made his Malayalam debut as a playback singer through the film.

The film was released on 17 March 1984 by Dinny Films and is regarded as one of the landmark films in Malayalam cinema. The success of the film triggered a deluge of screwball comedy films in Malayalam in mid-1980s. The movie was remade in five languages.

The core plotline is adapted from the Telugu movie Gopala Rao Gari Ammayi (1980) and its Tamil version Kodeeswaran Magal (1981) and also borrows plot elements the Charles Dickens's play The Strange Gentleman.

== Plot ==
Revathi comes to the city from a small town in search of a job and to have a good life and as it is with everyone, her problem starts with finding a house. Shyam wants to become a singer. His parents are against his wish to become a singer. So he runs away from home and needs a shelter. Revathi accidentally meets Shyam, who too is in search of a house through the common milk-boy, Chikku. Chikku offers them both a house to rent if they are ready to pose as husband and wife in front of the landlord.

Supran, a miserly moneylender who doesn't trust his much younger wife Kousalya is their landlord. Revathi in search of a job, meets Ravunni Menon, a rich man who owns a bungalow in the heart of the city. Ravunni Menon stays with his wife whose name too is Revathi.

Gopalakrishnan needs some investment to come up in business and life. But to get started, he ends up having to rob his stingy father of money that the latter had hidden away out of sight of tax authorities. He is in search of a rich woman he can marry. Accidentally, Revathi meets Gopalakrishnan who has come to Ravunni Menon's house to repair the electronic equipment, which he had sold to him.

Gopalakrishnan thinks that Revathi is Ravunni Menon's daughter and her beauty enchants him. Revathi learns that there is a job in Gopalakrishnan's showroom and manages to get a job with him by playing along with his mistaken belief that she is Ravunni Menon's daughter. She is aided in this subterfuge by the fact that she shares the same name as Ravunni Menon's wife and all of his business interests are named after "Revathi".

After office hours, Gopalakrishnan drops Revathi outside Ravunni Menon's house, thinking it to be her house. She always enters the bungalow through the front gate and skips out through the gate itself after hiding in the garden until Gopalakrishnan drives away. Ravunni Menon's wife, Revathi, sees her coming and going out of the bungalow and starts suspecting her husband of an affair.

Gopalakrishnan frequently visits the bungalow to visit Revathi, who is never there, and Ravunni Menon thinks his wife is having an affair with Gopalakrishnan. Further her encounter with "Thenga" Govindan Pillai makes the older Revathi believe that her husband has sons and daughters out of wedlock and, thus, is quite capable of another affair now.

Shyam in the meantime begins falling in love with Revathi and to make her jealous, he pretends that he is attracted to Kousalya, who in turn thinks this to be true and is ready to elope with him after robbing her miser husband.

In the climax, Gopalakrishnan sends a letter to Ravunni Menon that he is in love with Revathy, who considers it to for his wife. In the confusion Revathy reveals her identity. After a complicated fight, Revathy decides to spend the rest of her life with Shyam rather than with Gopalakrishnan, who wishes them luck. All ends good as Ravunni Menon and his wife Revathy decide to not separate, as they had planned earlier

== Cast ==
- Shankar as Shyam
- Mohanlal as Gopalakrishnan
- Menaka as Revathi
- Nedumudi Venu as Puthanpurayil Ravunni Menon
- Sukumari as Shankaramangalathil Revathi Amma, Ravunni Menon's wife
- M. G. Soman as Hari
- Jagathy Sreekumar as Chellappan
- Kuthiravattam Pappu as Kuttan ('Cherian' Nair)
- Baiju Santhosh as Chikku
- Soorya as Revathi's friend
- Sankaradi as Adv. Sankaran Kutty, Gopalakrishnan's father
- Poojappura Ravi as Supran
- Mala Aravindan as "Shakthi" Raghavan Pillai, a Police Constable
- C. I. Paul as "Thenga" Govinda Pillai
- Ambalapuzha Raju as Chellappaiyer, Lodge owner
- Sreenivasan as Narayanan
- Santhakumari as Kalyani, Gopalakrishnan's mother
- Thodupuzha Vasanthi as Kousalya, Supran's wife
- V. D. Rajappan as Keshu Pillai
- Santhosh as Santhosh, Ravunni Menon's son

== Reception and legacy ==
The film was distributed by Dinny Films, it was a commercial success and ran for more than 100 days in the theatres. Poochakkoru Mookkuthi is regarded as one of the landmark films in Malayalam cinema. The success of the film triggered a deluge of screwball comedy films in Malayalam in mid-1980s.

== Soundtrack ==
All lyrics are written by Chunakkara Ramankutty; all music is composed by M. G. Radhakrishnan.

| No. | Title | Artist(s) | Length |
|---|---|---|---|
| 1. | "Poochakkoru Mookkuthi" | K. J. Yesudas |
| 2. | "Kannane Kandu Sakhi" (Shanmukhapriya) | M. G. Sreekumar |
| 3. | "Oru Mridhu Mozhiyaay" (Mohanam) | M. G. Sreekumar, P. Susheela |
| 4. | "Panineerumaanam" | M. G. Sreekumar |

== Remakes ==
The film is partly inspired by the Telugu movie Gopal Rao Gari Ammayi (1980) and its Tamil version Kodeeswaran Magal (1981). The 1989 Tamil movie Thangamani Rangamani was partially based on this movie. It was remade in Hindi as Hungama (2003), in Telugu as Intlo Srimathi Veedhilo Kumari (2004), in Kannada as Jootata (2005), in Bangladesh Bengali as Bhalobeshe Bou Anbo (2009), in Indian Bengali as Le Halua Le (2012) and in Punjabi as Lovely Te Lovely (2015).
