= Sun Bangla =

Indian TV channel

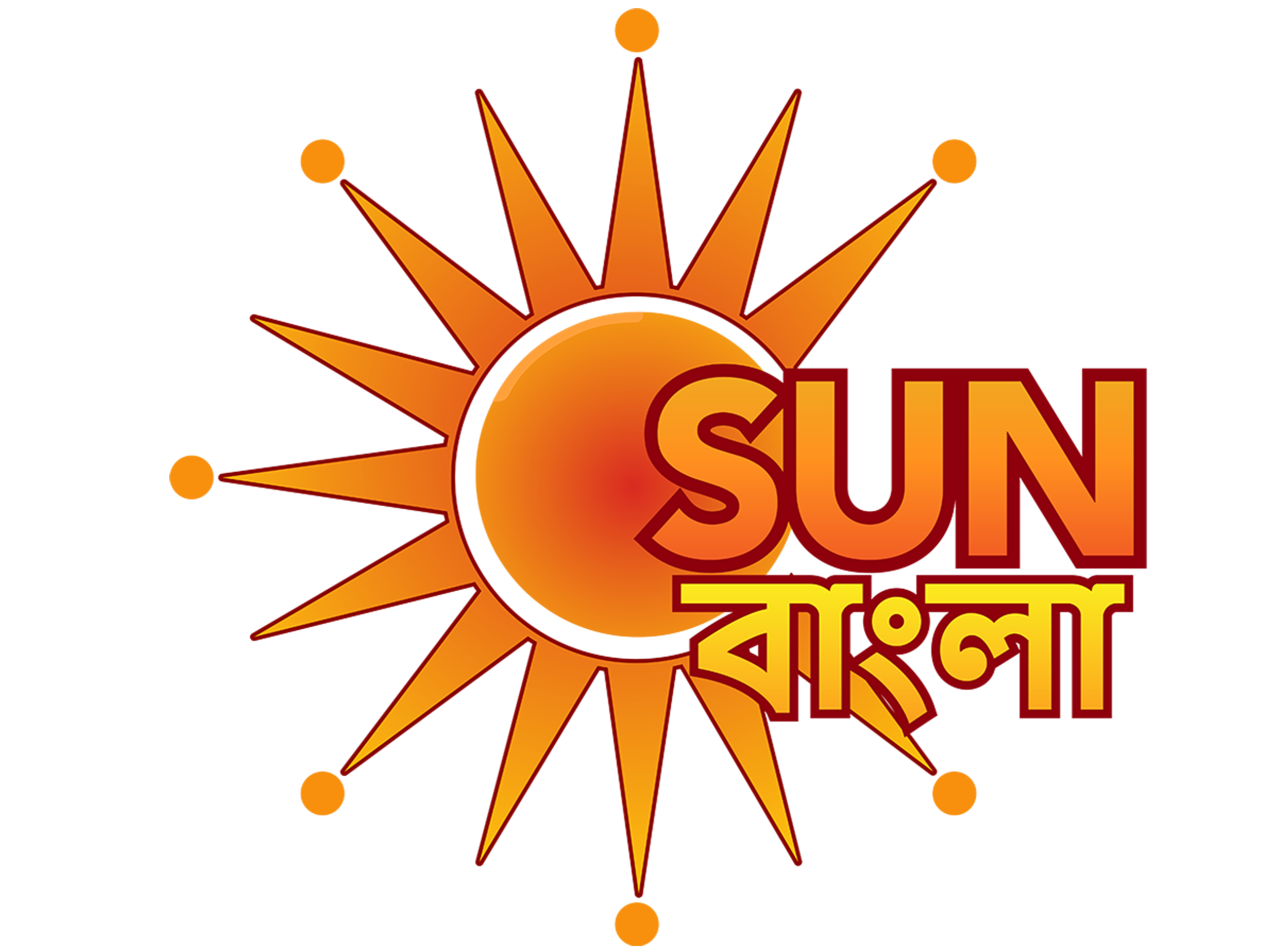
- Logo used since 2026
- Country: India
- Broadcast area: Worldwide
- Network: Sun TV Network
- Headquarters: Kolkata, West Bengal; India

Programming
- Language: Bengali
- Picture format: 1080p HDTV

Ownership
- Owner: Sun Group
- Sister channels: Sun TV Network (Channels)

History
- Launched: 3 February 2019; 7 years ago
- Replaced: Gemini News

Links
- Website: Sun Bangla

Availability

Streaming media
- Sun NXT (India): Sun Bangla

Sun Bangla is an Indian Bengali-language free-to-air general entertainment channel owned by Sun TV Network based in Chennai, Tamil Nadu. It was launched on 2 February 2019 and broadcasts Bengali entertainment programming. Sun Bangla is the first entry of Sun TV Network into the East Indian (out of South India) market. Its slogan is "Mone Prane Bengali", which means "Bengali In Heart and Soul." On 28 November 2023, Sun Bangla launched its own HD channel, Sun Bangla HD.

== Programming ==
=== Current broadcast ===
Show Name	Premiere date
Lakh Takkar Lokkhi Labh	1 December 2024
Prem Protigya	1 June 2026
Chanagiri	9 August 2026
Ramayan	8 November 2026

=== Formerly broadcast ===
Name	First aired	Last aired
Simana Periya	3 February 2019	24 August 2019
Sagarika	3 February 2019	25 August 2019
Asha Lata	3 February 2019	25 August 2019
Gangster Ganga	3 February 2019	22 September 2019
Mahatirtha Kalighat	3 February 2019	22 September 2019
Keshav	3 February 2019	24 November 2019
Beder Meye Jyotsna	3 February 2019	17 January 2021
Aye Khuku Aye	23 September 2019	19 January 2020
Kone Bou	23 September 2019	6 December 2020
Jiyonkathi	23 September 2019	18 April 2021
Sarbamangala	20 January 2020	14 February 2021
Sun Bangla Super Family	10 February 2020	23 August 2020
Singhalagna	10 February 2020	20 September 2020
Saraswatir Prem	7 December 2020	30 May 2021
Harano Sur	7 December 2020	30 May 2021
Kanyadan	7 December 2020	5 February 2023
Nayantara	22 March 2021	30 April 2023
Sundari	19 July 2021	11 June 2023
Debi	13 September 2021	6 February 2022
Agnishikha	25 January 2021	27 March 2022
Mompalok	26 April 2021	27 March 2022
Adorer Bon	8 November 2021	3 July 2022
Saathi	7 February 2022	3 August 2024
Amar Shona Chander Kona	28 March 2022	10 September 2022
Khule Bolun	22 May 2022	12 June 2022
Alor Theekana	19 September 2022	07 January 2023
Phaguner Mohona	6 February 2023	10 March 2024
Roop Sagore Moner Manush	3 July 2023	31 March 2024
Shyama	11 September 2023	3 December 2023
Dwitiyo Basanta	18 December 2023	29 September 2024
Akash Kusum	29 January 2024	31 August 2025
Mangalmayee Maa Sitala	11 March 2024	19 August 2024
Constable Manju	1 April 2024	29 September 2024
Basu Paribar	5 August 2024	23 February 2025
Debibaran	30 September 2024	16 March 2025
Kon Se Aalor Swapno Niye	30 September 2024	14 September 2025
Sholok Saree	10 February 2025	23 November 2025
Putul TTP	24 February 2025	6 December 2025
Video Bouma	17 March 2025	26 October 2025
Crime Diary	16 June 2025	19 January 2026
Brindaban Bilasini	31 August 2025	30 April 2026

=== Dubbed Series ===
Series	First aired	Last aired
Jai Hanuman	27 April 2019	4 August 2019
Maya	26 August 2019	20 November 2019
Balak Gopal	26 August 2019	6 September 2020
Nandini	26 August 2019	18 April 2021
Jhansir Rani Lakshmi Bai	9 December 2019	28 March 2020
Monihara	7 September 2020	16 January 2021
Misti O Aami	11 January 2021	21 March 2021
Bidhilipi	5 April 2021	9 May 2021
Onno Roope Nandini	19 April 2021	9 May 2021
Lakshmi Stores	5 April 2021	11 July 2021
Sunetra (Nandini 2)	14 November 2022	26 March 2023
Paapnashini Ganga	19 June 2023	10 September 2023
Chawa Pawa	11 March 2024	30 June 2024
Sindoorer Adhikar	30 September 2024	5 April 2025
Karmadhikari Shanidev	14 April 2025	27 April 2025
Ramayan	5 May 2025	8 November 2025
