= Dabbu =

Indian Bengali film music composer

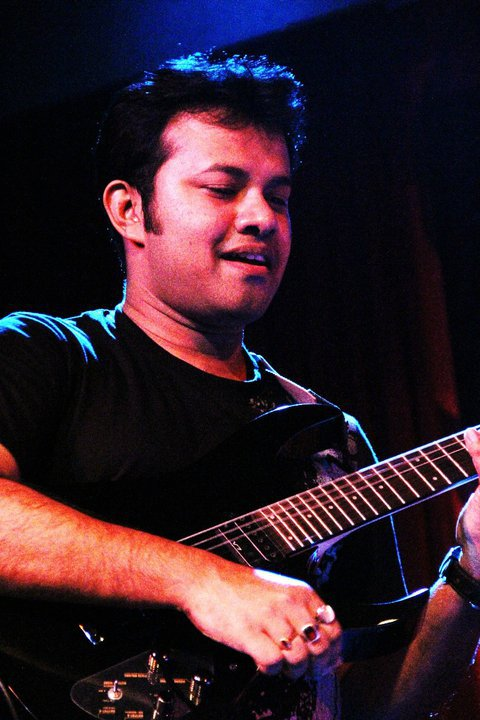

Background information
- Born: 2 December 1979; Kolkata, West Bengal, India
- Genres: Indian music, Jazz
- Occupations: Composer, music producer
- Years active: 2002–present
- Website: Dabbu

Prasenjit Ghosal (born 2 December 1979), known professionally as Dabbu, (Bengali: ডাব্বু) is a music composer based in Mumbai. He workes as a music composer in Mumbai and Kolkata. He has closely worked with film production company SVF and has composed several Bengali films songs which have been sung by artists including Arijit Singh, Armaan malik, Papon, Anupam Roy, and Shaan.

== Performance ==
He plays the guitar and has performed with on albums including This is not fusion in front of live audience in Frankfurt at Book Fest, Lille at Fest, and Bozar Fest in Brussels in 2006. DABBU performed at the British Museum, Johannesburg in 2011 for WITS university and has collaborated with vocalists including Shreya Ghoshal and Gary Lawyer during tours. He has played for bands such as Hip Pocket and also accompanied jazz musicians such as Louis Bankz at venues which have included, Blue Frog, Jazz By the Bay, Hard Rock Cafe.

== Career ==
Dabbu was born in Kolkata and started his career as a guitar player, where he played for films, adverts, and songs. He started his music direction career with film production company Shree Venkatesh Films in Kolkata. He moved to Mumbai in 2009.

== Filmography ==
Denotes films that have not yet been released

Year	Movie	Language	Songs	Director	Producer	
2014	Bangali Babu English Mem	Bengali	Honey Bunny, Hawara Chupi Chupi, Dol Duluni, Ore Mon Udashi	Rabi Kinagi	Shree Venkatesh Films	
2014	Kokhon Tomar Asbe Telephone	Bengali	Title Song, Ek Dui Teen, Jokhun Tokhun, Tumio Ki Anmona	Arindam Mamdo Dey	PB Films	
2016	Samraat: The King Is Here	Bengali (Bangladesh)	Samraat (Title Track)	Mohammad Mostafa Kamal Raz	Orkee Production & Cinemawala	
2016	Mental	Bengali (Bangladesh)	Title Song, Prem Ta Toder Nesha, Mon Najehal, Khaina Jonab, Ureche Dhulo, Bolte Baki Koto Ki	Shamim Ahamed Roni	Bangla Express Films	
2016	Bossgiri	Bengali (Bangladesh)	Bossgiri (Title Track)	Shamim Ahamed Roni	Khan Films	
2017	Dhat Teri Ki	Bengali (Bangladesh)	Title Song	Shamim Ahamed Roni	Jaaz Multimedia	
2017	Amar Aponjon	Bengali	Ele Chupi Chupi, Esho Amar Nodir Tire	Raja Chanda	Sunday Films & Actors Studio	
2017	Rangbaz	Bengali (Bangladesh)	Title Song, Rimjhim	Abdul Mannan	Shree Venkatesh Films	
2019	Mon Jaane Na	Bengali	Keno Je Toke	Shagufta Rafique	Shree Venkatesh Films	
2019	Network	Bengali	Deewana Bole Dake Amaay	Saptaswa Basu	Neo Studios	
2019	Beporowa	Bengali	Beporowa Title Song, Ghum Ghum Adore (ঘুম ঘুম আদরে), Khati Sona (খাঁটি সোনা)	Raja Chanda	Jaaz Multimedia	
2020	Shahenshah	Bengali (Bangladesh)	Premer Raja	Shamim Ahmed Rony	Unlimited Audio Video	
2020	Harano Prapti	Bengali	All Songs	Raja Chanda	Greentouch Entertainment	
2020	Operation Agneepath	Bengali (Bangladesh)	Title Song	Ashiqur Rahman	Vertex Production	
2020	Biye.com	Bengali	All Songs	Sudeshna Roy, Abhijeet Guha	Shadow Films	
2020	Ajob Premer Golpo	Bengali	All Songs	Raja Chanda	Zee Bangla Cinema	
2021	Magic	Bengali	All Songs	Raja Chanda	SSG Entertainment Pvt. Ltd	
2022	BhoyPeo Na	Bengali	All Songs	Ayan Dey	Big Screen Production Pvt Ltd	.
