= List of Indian Bengali films of 2016 =

This is a list of Bengali language films released in India in the year 2016.

== Box office collection ==
The following is the list of highest-grossing Bengali films (India) released in 2016. The rank of the films in the following table depends on the estimate of worldwide collections as reported by organizations classified as green by Wikipedia. (Note: See WP:RSP, WP:ICTFSOURCES) There is no official tracking of domestic box office figures within India.

Highest grossing Bengali cinema films of 2025
Rank (Note: Sorted based on the lowest value when figures are presented as a range, and for the same value, the older item is given a higher order.)	Title	Production company	Distributor	Worldwide gross	Ref.
1	Praktan	Windows Production		₹8.50 crore	
2	Zulfiqar	Shree Venkatesh Films		₹8.20 crore	
3	Gangster	Shree Venkatesh Films		₹6.50 crore	

== January–March ==
Opening		Title	Director	Cast	Production company	Genre	Ref.
J A N U A R Y	1	Monchora	Sandip Ray	Saswata Chatterjee, June Malia, Rana Mitra, Paran Bandopadhyay, Abir Chatterjee, Raima Sen	Eros International	Drama	
J A N U A R Y	1	Raater Rajani Gandha	Anup Sengupta	Rituparna Sengupta, Rajesh Sharma, Kharaj Mukherjee	Cell Media	Drama	
J A N U A R Y	1	Hera Pheri	Sujit Guha	Vivek, Subhasish, Rajatabha		Drama	
J A N U A R Y	8	Peace Haven	Suman Ghosh	Soumitra Chatterjee, Paran Bandopadhyay, Arun Mukhopadhyay, Neel Mukherjee	Tripod Entertainment	Drama	
J A N U A R Y	8	Tor Ektu Choya	Paresh Pal	Abhiraj, Ratri Goswami, Annu Jaiswal, Arun Banerjee		Drama	
J A N U A R Y	15	Angaar	Wajed Ali Sumon, Nehal Dutta	Om, Jolly, Rajatava Dutta, Ashish Vidyarthi, Amit Hasan, Tiger Robi, Kharaj Mukherjee, Ahmed Sharif	Eskay Movies	Drama, action	
J A N U A R Y	15	Bastu-Shaap	Kaushik Ganguly	Parambrata Chatterjee, Abir Chatterjee, Raima Sen, Churni Ganguly	GreenTouch Entertainment	Drama	
J A N U A R Y	15	Beparoyaa	Pijush Saha	Surya, Papri, Rajatava Dutta, Supriyo Dutta, Kaushik Banerjee, Master Prayus Raj	Prince Entertainment P4	Drama, Romance, Action	
J A N U A R Y	22	Chorabali	Subhrajit Mitra	Tonushree Chakroborty, June Malia, Shataf Figar, Malobika Banerjee, Sayani Datta, Barun Chanda, Locket Chatterrjee, Dipanjan Basak, Tathagata, Mou Baidya	Macneill Engineering	Thriller	
J A N U A R Y	29	Sunyo Je Kol	Bhaswati Roy	Rajesh Das, Saswata Banerjee, Suddhasatwya Chatterjee, Sayantika Banerjee	Download Creation	Drama	
F E B R U A R Y	12	Ki Kore Toke Bolbo	Ravi Kinnagi	Ankush Hazra, Mimi Chakraborty, Kharaj Mukherjee, Shantilal Mukherjee, Shankar Chakraborty, Reshmi Sen, Manasi Sinha	Shree Venkatesh Films	Drama, Romance	
F E B R U A R Y	12	Mahanayika	Saikat Bhakat	Rituparna Sengupta, Soumitra Chatterjee, Indraneil Sengupta, Saheb Chatterjee, Chandan Sen	Rkb Films	Drama	
F E B R U A R Y	12	Hero 420	Sujit Mondal	Om, Nusraat Faria Mazhar, Riya Sen	Eskay Movies	Drama, action, Romance	
F E B R U A R Y	19	Dark Chocolate	Agnidev Chatterjee	Mahima Chaudhry, Riya Sen, Mumtaz Sorcar, Indrashish Roy, Sudip Mukherjee, Kaushik Sen	Macneill Engineering	Drama	
F E B R U A R Y	26	Sohra Bridge	Bappaditya Bandopadhyay	Barun Chanda, Niharika Singh, Nishita Goswami		Drama	
M A R C H	13	Akash Choan	Abhijit Guha, Sudeshna Roy	Ridhima Ghosh, Arjun Chakrabarty		Romance, Comedy	
M A R C H	25	Sangabora	Bulan Bhattacharjee	Soumitra Chatterjee, Samadarshi Dutta		Adventure	

== April–June ==
Opening		Title	Director	Cast	Production company	Genre	Ref.
A P R I L	14	Power	Rajiv Kumar Biswas	Jeet, Sayantika Banerjee, Nusrat Jahan	Shree Venkatesh Films, Surinder Films	Romance, Action	
A P R I L	15	Shankhachil	Gautam Ghosh	Prosenjit, Kusum Sikder		Historical Drama	
M A Y	13	Cinemawala	Kaushik Ganguly	Parambrata Chatterjee, Sohini Sarkar	Shree Venkatesh Films	Drama	
M A Y	27	Praktan	Nandita Roy & Shiboprosad Mukherjee	Prosenjit Chatterjee, Rituparna Sengupta, Soumitra Chatterjee, Aparajita Adhya, Sabitri Chatterjee, Biswanath Basu, Manali Dey	Nandita Roy & Shiboprosad Mukherjee	Drama	
M A Y	27	Chhip Suto Char	Jay Bhattacharjee, Mou Badiya	Romance	Susanta Saha		
J U N E	17	Shororipu	Ayan Chakraborty	Chiranjeet Chakraborty, Indraneil Sengupta, Rajatabha Dutta		Crime	
J U N E	24	Postmaster	Srijon Bardhan	Ishaan Mazumdar, Pujarini Ghosh, Biswajit Chakraborty, Tulika Basu, Rohan Bhattacharya, Biplab Chatterjee, Bodhiswattya Mazumdar, Mousumi Ghosh	Sri Media	Romance, Tragedy, Drama	

== July–September ==
Opening		Title	Director	Cast	Production company	Genre	Ref.
J U L Y	6	Kelor Kirti	Raja Chanda	Dev, Jisshu Sengupta, Ankush Hazra, Koushani Mukherjee, Sayantika Banerjee, Nusrat Jahan, Rudranil Ghosh	Shree Venkatesh Films, Surinder Films	Comedy	
J U L Y	6	Badsha – The Don	Baba Yadav	Jeet, Nusrat Faria Mazhar, Shraddha Das	Eskay Movies	Romance, Action	
J U L Y	29	Khawto	Kamaleshwar Mukherjee	Prosenjit Chatterjee, Paoli Dam,	Shree Venkatesh Films	Drama, Romance	
J U L Y	29	Langto: The Film	Sourish Dey	Rittwik Roy, Bhaskar Dutta, Jhelum Ghosh, Faiz Khan	Sanjib Sarkar (Music Director & Sound designer)	Thriller	
J U L Y	29	Sesh Sangbad	Pallav Gupta	Srabanti Chatterjee, Sujoy Ghosh		Crime Drama	
A U G U S T	12	Shikari	Joydeeb Mukherjee	Shakib Khan, Srabanti Chatterjee	Eskay Movies	Action	
A U G U S T	12	Hemanta	Anjan Dutt	Parambrata Chatterjee, Jisshu Sengupta		Drama	
A U G U S T	14	Eagoler Chokh	Arindam Sil	Saswata Chatterjee, Jaya Ahsan, Payel Sarkar, Subhrajit Dutt	Shree Venkatesh Films	Crime Thriller	
A U G U S T	26	Saheb Bibi Golaam	Pratim D. Gupta	Swastika Mukherjee, Anjan Dutt, Ritwick Chakraborty	Friend Communication	Action, Thriller	
S E P T E M B E R	9	Kiriti O Kalo Bhromor	Anindya Bikash Datta	Indraneil Sengupta, Kaushik Sen	Camellia Productions, Rupa Datta	Thriller	
S E P T E M B E R	9	Love Express	Rajiv Kumar Biswas	Dev, Nusrat Jahan	Shree Venkatesh Films, Surinder Films	Romance, Comedy	

== October–December ==
Opening		Title	Director	Cast	Production company	Genre	Ref.
O C T O B E R	7	Gangster	Birsa Dasgupta	Yash Dasgupta, Mimi Chakraborty	Shree Venkatesh Films	Romance, Thriller, action	
O C T O B E R	7	Zulfiqar	Srijit Mukherjee	Prosenjit Chatterjee, Dev, Ankush Hazra, Nusrat Jahan, Paoli Dam	Shree Venkatesh Films	Drama	
O C T O B E R	7	Prem Ki Bujhini	Sudipto Sarkar	Om, Subhashree Ganguly	Eskay Movies	Romance, drama	
O C T O B E R	7	Byomkesh O Chiriyakhana	Anjan Dutt	Jisshu Sengupta	RP Techvisions	Thriller	
O C T O B E R	7	Abhimaan	Raj Chakraborty	Jeet, Subhashree Ganguly, Sayantika Banerjee	Reliance Entertainment, Grassroot Entertainment, Walzen Media Works	Romance, Drama, action	
O C T O B E R	21	Banchha Elo Phire	Amitabha Pathak	Madhabi Mukherjee, Paran Banerjee, Rajatava Dutta, Bobby Chakaborty, Deepankar De, June Malia, Biplab Chatterjee	AKMA Entertainment, Innovador It Solution Pvt. Ltd.	Comedy, Drama	
N O V E M B E R	11	Colkatay Columbus	Saurav Palodhi	Mir Afsar Ali, Gaurav Chakrabarty		Satirical comedy	
N O V E M B E R	18	Romantic Noy	Rajib Chowdhury	Saheb Bhattacharya		Drama	
N O V E M B E R	18	Thammar Boyfriend	Anindya Ghosh	Abir Chatterjee, Sabitri Chatterjee		Comedy	
D E C E M B E R	2	Bastav	Shyamal Bose	Saswata Chatterjee, Soumitra Chatterjee		Drama	
D E C E M B E R	2	Cholai	Arun Roy	Saswata Chatterjee, Nimal Ghosh		Comedy	
D E C E M B E R	9	Amar Prem	Haranath Chakraborty	Gourab Roy Chowdhury, Antasheela Ghosh, Megha Chowdhury	M. M. Moviez	Romance	
D E C E M B E R	16	Byomkesh Pawrbo	Arindam Sil	Abir Chatterjee, Sohini Sarkar, Ritwick Chakraborty	Shree Venkatesh Films, Surinder Films	Thriller	
D E C E M B E R	16	Double Feluda	Sandip Ray	Sabyasachi Chakraborty, Saswata Chatterjee	Eros International	Crime thriller detective film	
D E C E M B E R	23	Haripada Bandwala	Pathikrit Basu	Ankush Hazra, Nusrat Jahan	Shree Venkatesh Films	Romance, Comedy	
D E C E M B E R	23	Rokto	Wazed Ali Sumon	Porimoni, Ziaul Roshan	Eskay Movies	Action	
D E C E M B E R	30	Kiriti Roy	Anjan Dutt	Chiranjeet Chakraborty	Eskay Movies	Crime thriller detective	
