= Premi O Premi =

2017 Bangladeshi film

- Theatrical poster
- Directed by: Jakir Hossain Raju
- Written by: Abdullah Jahir Babu
- Produced by: Abdul Aziz
- Starring: Arifin Shuvoo; Nusraat Faria
- Cinematography: Tuban
- Edited by: Mohammad Kalam
- Music by: Music; Akassh; Background music Emon Saha
- Production company: Jaaz Multimedia
- Distributed by: Jaaz Multimedia
- Release date: 10 February 2017
- Running time: 134 minutes
- Country: Bangladesh
- Language: Bengali

Premi O Premi is a 2017 Bangladeshi Bengali-language romantic comedy film. The film is directed by Jakir Hossain Raju. Film dialogues are written by Abdullah Jahir Babu. Abdul Aziz has produced the film under the banner of Jaaz Multimedia. The film is inspired from 2010 American film Leap Year. The film stars Arifin Shuvoo, Nusraat Faria and Amaan Reza in the lead roles. This is the first collaboration between Shuvoo and Faria. The film revolves around the love story of Maria and Shimanto. Maria (Nusraat Faria), who wants to propose to her boyfriend, leaves Bandarban for Kolkata with Shimanto (Arifin Shuvoo). But in Kolkata, she finds out that her lover Arian has cheated on her, so she comes to Bangladesh and starts a happy life with Shimanto.

The film was released on 10 February 2017 in 87 theaters across Bangladesh. It was the biggest worldwide release for a Bangladeshi film. The film was released in the United States on 24 February 2017. The film was nominated for the Best Screenplay category at the SAARC Film Festival held in 2017.

== Plot ==
We see Maria at first of the film, who works in a company in London. her boyfriend Arian leaves for Kolkata after hearing about his grandfather's illness, just three days before his birthday.. Maria wanted to propose to Arian on his birthday, but it didn't happen as Arian leaved for India. Then Maria's friend suggests Maria to go to Kolkata and surprise Arian and propose to him. Maria was traveling from London to Kolkata by a plane, the plane hit a severe storm on the way. As a result, the plane made an emergency landing at Shah Amanat International Airport in Chittagong.

Maria started looking for the way to Dhaka. He planned to go by road. He hires a car, but the driver and his accomplice kidnapped her and take her to Bandarban. Maria tries to escape but gets noticed by a local don. Then Shimanto came and rescued Maria. Shimanto works as a manager of a hotel in Bandarban. Besides he helps the poor and helpless people. Then Maria opens up to Shimanto and says that Shimanto agrees to go to Kolkata.

The next day they went out. They face various problems on the way. They stay in the house station master of Bandarban railway station for three days. There Shimanto's cuisine is highly appreciated. After many adventures they reach Kolkata. Just as Shimanto goes to speak her mind, Arian arrives and takes Maria away. Shimanto's mind breaks. He returned to Bangladesh heartbroken. Later, Maria finds out that Arian is cheating on her.

Shimanto cannot repay the loan back to Bangladesh. Then Maria came to Bangladesh and helped Shimanto with money. Maria wanted Shimanto to accept her marriage proposal, but Shimanto refused. Maria commits suicide in grief. Shimanto then stops her and makes her wear a wedding ring.

== Cast ==
- Arifin Shuvoo as Shimanto, A manager of a hotel in Bandarban, who helps poor and needy people
- Nusraat Faria as Maria, who works in London and wants to propose her boyfriend
- Amaan Reza as Arian, Maria's boyfriend, who cheated on her
- Amjad Hossain as the station master of the Bandarban train station
- Rebeka as the wife of station master
- Shiba Shanu as a local don who kidnapped Maria
- Chikon Ali as an associate of a local don
- Uzzal as an officer of Shah Amanat International Airport
- Prabir Mitra as Arian's grandfather (Special Appearance)

== Music ==
Premi O Premi

Soundtrack album by Akassh
- Released: 2017
- Recorded: 2016
- Genre: Feature film soundtrack
- Length: 14:14
- Language: Bengali
- Label: Jaaz Multimedia

Akassh chronology
Ami Tomar Hote Chai (2016)	Premi O Premi (2017)	Sultana Bibiana (2017)

Singles from Premi O Premi
- 1. "Premi O Premi (title song)" Released: 10 November 2016; 2. "Chok Chok Korlei" Released: 17 November 2016; 3. "Anek Kotha Chilo" Released: 24 November 2016; 4. "Sajna" Released: 1 December 2016

The title song released on 10 November. The singer of the song is Akassh. "Chok Chok Korlei" released on 17 November. The singer duo for the song is Akassh and Antara Mitra. 24 November 3rd song "Anek Kotha Chilo" released. The singer of the song is Zubeen Garg. On 1 December "Sajna" released. The singer of the song is Imran Mahmudul.

All music is composed by Akassh.

Track Listing
No.	Title	Lyrics	Singer(s)	Length
1.	"Premi O Premi (title song)"	Kabir Bakul	Akassh	03:39
2.	"Chok Chok Korlei"	Priyo Chattopadhyay	Akassh & Lemis	02:58
3.	"Anek Kotha Chilo"	Robiul Islam Jibon	Zubeen Garg	04:09
4.	"Sajna"	Priyo Chattopadhyay	Imran Mahmudul	03:38
Total length:				14:14

== Production ==
=== Development ===
In 2015, Ashok Pati announced the production of a film, titled Premi O Premi. But later its name was changed to Aashiqui. It starred Ankush Hazra and Nusrat Faria herself. It was essentially Faria's debut film.

This is the 17th film directed by Jakir Hossain Raju. Before this he directed successful films like Jibon Songshar, Mone Prane Acho Tumi, Amar Praner Priya, Bhalobaslei Ghor Bandha Jay Na, Poramon, Dobir Saheber Songsar and Niyoti. This is his sixth collaboration with production house Jaaz Multimedia. Earlier he directed Poramon, Dabir Saheber Songsar, Onek Sadher Moyna, Onek Dame Kena and Niyoti for Jaaz Multimedia productions. This is the second collaboration between Arifin Shuvoo and the director, they previously worked together in the film Niyoti (2016). This is the first collaboration between Faria and the director.

The film's dialogue writer is Abdullah Jahir Babu. The cinematographer of the film was Tuban and the editor was Mohammad Kalam. The film's title song was choreographed by India's Adil Shaikh. Baba Yadav was the choreographer for the song Chok Chok Korlei. The other two songs are choreographed by the director himself.

=== Casting ===
Arifin Shuvoo, Nusraat Faria and Amaan Reza were signed to play the lead roles in the film. Later, Amjad Hossain, Rebeka, Shiba Shanu, Chikon Ali and Uzzal were signed. Prabir Mitra also played a special role in the film.

=== Filming ===
The film has been shot in Bangladesh Film Development Corporation, London, Bandarban and Kolkata. Faria and director Raju fell sick during the shooting. So the shooting stopped for a few days. Later they started filming again.

== Release ==
The film was cleared by the Bangladesh Film Censor Board without cuts. The film released simultaneously in 87 theaters on 10 February 2017. The film was released in the United States on 24 February 2017.

=== Promotion ===
To increase the audience appeal of the film, Jaaz Multimedia create some promotional clips and organize a quiz.

=== Reception ===
Bangladeshi newspaper The Daily Star gave the film 7/10 stars. It is said there that, "From the very first scene, Arefin Shuvo captures the attention of the audience really well. He seems to be getting better at acting with each movie he does. In every scene, from his dialogues to his costumes, he blends into the character perfectly. Nusrat Faria portrays the character of a girl studying abroad really well. Both her get up and her way of delivering the dialogues is very smart. The Bangladeshi movie industry really needs more smart actresses like her. Overall, the movie is breathtaking to watch specially because of the beautiful locations and amazing cinematography. This movie is a prime example of how the Bangladeshi movie industry is getting better day by day. The plot of this movie is inspired by Hollywood's "Leap Year". On the other hand, The Statesman included the film among the 5 significant Bangladeshi films of 2017. It is said there that, "Premi O Premi by Zakir Hossen Raju won many hearts. Arefin Shuvo and Nusrat Faria came together for the making of this film and they both looked fantastic with each other. The movie proved to be a success at the box office due to its colourful settings and a surprising plot-twist. The compelling story made it popular among the people and it ran for a quite long time in the theatres. Both the actor’s performances were admired by the critics and the fans."

== Controversy ==
After the release of the film, it was spread on social media that Premi O Premi was a copy of the film 2010 American Leap Year. Audiences and critics alike commented that the story of Leap Year is largely similar to the story of the film. In Leap Year, the actress left to propose to her boyfriend on February 29. Due to bad weather, the aircraft lands in the middle of the destination. The actor then embarks on a journey to take her to her desired destination. Criticism was born because of this similarity of story. But the director confirms, the film is probably inspired.

== Accolades ==
Year	Award	Category	Recipient(s)	Result	Ref
2018	SAARC International Film Festival	Best screenplay	Abdullah Jahir Babu	Nominated	

== See also ==
- Badsha-The Don
- Jinn 3
- Dhat Teri Ki
