= Inspector Notty K =

- Inspector Notty K Movie Poster
- Directed by: Ashok Pati
- Written by: Anshuman Pratyush & Prameet
- Screenplay by: Anshuman Pratyush & Prameet
- Produced by: Jeet; Nispal Singh; Abdul Aziz
- Starring: Jeet; Nusrat Faria; Champa Akter
- Cinematography: Shailesh Awashthi
- Edited by: Md. Kalam
- Music by: Savvy Gupta; Suddho Roy
- Production companies: Jeetz Filmworks; Walzen Media Works; Surinder Films; Jaaz Multimedia
- Distributed by: Jeetz Filmworks; Jaaz Multimedia
- Release dates: 19 January 2018 (India); 26 January 2018 (Bangladesh)
- Country: India
- Language: Bengali

Inspector Notty K is a 2018 Indian Bengali language romantic comedy film, directed by Ashok Pati and produced by Jeet, Nispal Singh, Gopal Madnani, Amit Jumrani, Joydeep Roy Chowdhury and Abdul Aziz. Jeet stars as the titular character alongside Nusrat Faria, the two starring in their third film together after Badsha – The Don (2016) and Boss 2: Back to Rule (2017).

== Plot ==
The film is about Natabar Khara alias Notty K. He always talks about a Bengali word, "Gutil". He dreams to be a police inspector. For the case love and romance, he created a fake case and went to Italy. There, he meets Sameera, an inspector of the Italian police. Notty K falls in love with Sameera. Sameera becomes angry at first, but later she also falls in love with him. After receiving all information from Deben Ghosh about Notty K, Sameera becomes very angry. During her engagement, she picks Notty K as her life partner. After returning to India, Sameera gives Notty K a condition, to tell her the meaning of the word "Gutil", else he can't marry Sameera. Unexpectedly, a random biker tells Notty K the meaning of "Gutil". The biker said that "Gutil" meant "Goodwill". Sameera and Notty K start a happy life.

== Cast ==
- Jeet as Natabar Khara aka Notty K, the would be inspector of Uttarpara Police Station
- Nusraat Faria as Sameera/ Simi, inspector of the Italian police
- Champa Gulshan Ara Akter as Sameera's mother
- Kharaj Mukherjee as Deben Ghosh (OC)
- Supriyo Dutta as Lambadar Khara, Notty K's father
- Pradip Dhar as constable of Uttarpara Police Station
- Biswanath Basu (special appearance) as a biker without helmet
- Sanghashree Mishra

== Production ==
The film was announced two months after the release of Boss 2: Back to Rule, and filmed in Bangladesh, Kolkata, Italy and Bangkok.

== Release ==
The film started as an India-Bangladesh joint production by Jeetz Filmworks and Jaaz Multimedia. Later in shooting, the rules for joint productions changed. Rather than delay the release until a required preview committee was formed, the producers decided to release it as an Indian film, which Jazz Multimedia then imported to Bangladesh.

It was released in India on 19 January 2018 in 130 theatres. Originally intended to release simultaneously in Bangladesh, it was delayed there by one week to 26 January, when it opened in 81 theatres.

=== Critical reception ===
In a review by The Times of India, the film received 2.5 out of 5 stars, saying the film fails to keep the audience entertained due to its weak screenplay and storyline.

== Soundtrack ==
Inspector Notty K (Original Motion Picture Soundtrack)

Soundtrack album by Suddho Roy & Savvy Gupta
- Released: January 2018
- Genre: Original Motion Picture Soundtrack
- Length: 17:25
- Language: Bengali
- Labels: Grassroot Entertainment; Jaaz Multimedia
- Producers: Suddho Roy; Savvy Gupta

Suddho Roy chronology
Abhimaan (2016)	Inspector Notty K (2018)

Savvy Gupta chronology
Noor Jahaan (2018)	Inspector Notty K (2018)	Bhalo Theko (2018)

The soundtrack of the film was composed by Suddho Roy & Savvy Gupta. The soundtrack features vocals from Nakash Aziz, Dev Negi, Shweta Pandit, Raj Barman & Sonu Nigam.

Track listing
No.	Title	Lyrics	Music	Singer(s)	Length
1.	"Inspector Notty K (Title Track)"	Raja Chanda	Suddho Roy	Nakash Aziz	3:59
2.	"Chai Na Kichui"	Priyo Chattopadhyay	Suddho Roy	Dev Negi & Shweta Pandit	3:53
3.	"Moner Kinare"	Pranjol	Savvy Gupta	Raj Barman	4:40
4.	"Bhul Ja Korechi Ami"	Pranjol	Suddho Roy	Sonu Nigam	4:19
Total length:					17:25
