= Jaaz Multimedia =

Film production and distribution house in Bangladesh

- Type: Privately held company
- Industry: Entertainment
- Founded: 2011
- Founder: Abdul Aziz
- Headquarters: Dhaka, Bangladesh
- Key people: Abdul Aziz (Chairman); Mohammed Alimullah (CEO)
- Products: Films; Music
- AUM: US$370.68 million (2021)
- Divisions: Production; Distribution; Studio; Home Video; Music; Digital; Talent; Brand Partnerships; Communications; Technical; Visual Effects

Jaaz Multimedia is a film production and distribution house in Bangladesh.

== History ==
=== 2011–2014: Initial years ===
Jaaz Multimedia released their first film, Bhalobasar Rong starring Bappy and Mahiya Mahi, in 2012. In 2013, Jaaz Multimedia released four films: Onnorokom Bhalobasha, PoraMon, Bhalobasha Aaj Kal and Tobuo Bhalobashi, all of which starred Mahiya Mahi. PoraMon also starred Symon, while the commercial success Bhalobasha Aaj Kal co-starred Shakib Khan, and Tobuo Bhalobashi co-starred Bappy.

Jaaz Multimedia released seven films in 2014, many of which also starred Mahiya Mahi. Ki Darun Dekhte, Dobir Saheber Songsar and Onek Sadher Moyna co-starred Bappy and Agnee co-starred Arifin Shuvo.

=== 2015–present: Indo-Bangladeshi joint ventures ===
Beginning in 2015, Jaaz Multimedia began releasing Indo-Bangladesh joint venture films with Eskay Movies, Star Studios, Viacom18 Studios, Yash Raj Films, Dharma Productions, Konidela Production Company, Mythri Movie Makers, White Hill Studios and PTC Motion Pictures would later lead to the two production houses collaborating on many films. Jaaz is renowned for launching talents, in 2024 Jaaz Multimedia officially launched the youngest film director in Bangladesh's history Suzein Salam in the first out-of-Dhaka-made film Potu.

== As distributor ==
Year	Film	Director	Cast	Note	Ref.
2015	Krishnopokkho	Meher Afroz Shaon	Riaz, Mahiya Mahi, Ferdous		
2016	Bossgiri	Shamim Ahamed Roni	Shakib Khan, Shabnom Bubly		
2017	Valobasha Emoni Hoy	Tania Ahmed	Bidya Sinha Saha Mim, Irfan Sajjad, Tariq Anam Khan, Mir Sabbir, Mishu Sabbir		
2017	Bolo Dugga Maiki	Raj Chakraborty	Ankush Hazra, Nusrat Jahan		
2017	Yeti Obhijaan	Srijit Mukherjee	Prosenjit Chatterjee, Aryan Bhowmik, Jisshu Sengupta, Bidya Sinha Saha Mim, Ferdous, Alex O' Nell		
2017	Cockpit	Kamaleshwar Mukherjee	Dev, Koel Mallick, Rukmini Maitra, Ziaul Roshan		
2017	Gohin Baluchor	Badrul Anam Soud	Tanvir, Moon, Neela, Suborna Mustafa, Raisul Islam Asad, Fazlur Rahman Babu		
2018	Putro	Saiful Islam Mannu	Ferdous, Jaya Ahsan		
2018	Fidaa	Pathikrit Basu	Yash Dasgupta, Sanjana Banerjee		
2018	Bizli	Iftakar Chowdhury	Eamin Haque Bobby, Ranojoy Bishnu		
2018	Sultan: The Saviour	Raja Chanda	Jeet, Bidya Sinha Saha Mim, Priyanka Sarkar		
2018	Naqaab	Rajiv Kumar Biswas	Shakib Khan, Nusrat Jahan, Sayantika Banerjee		
2018	Debi	Anam Biswas	Jaya Ahsan Chanchal Chowdhury Sabnam Faria Iresh Zaker		
2018	Mr. Bangladesh	Khijir Hayat Khan	Khijir Hayat Khan, Sanarai Debi Shanu, Tiger Robi, Shahriar Ferdous Sazeeb, Marion Pellegrin, Hamidur Rahman, Shamim Hasan Sarkar, Solaiman Shukhon		
2018	Orpita	Shahriar Nazim Joy	Golam Farida Chhanda, Tauquir Ahmed, Mamunur Rashid, Shahiduzzaman Selim, Nazia Haque Orsha		
2019	Nolok	Sakib Sonet and Team	Shakib Khan, Bobby		
2020	Hridoy Jurey	Rafique Sikder	Nirob, Priyanka Sarkar		
2020	Kathbirali	Niamul Hasan Mukta	Orchita Sporshia, Asaduzzaman Abir		
2020	Bishwoshundori	Chayanika Chowdhury	Siam Ahmed, Pori Moni, Fazlur Rahman Babu		
2020	Chol Jai	Masuma Rahman Tani	Anisur Rahman Milon, Lucy Tripti Gomes, Turjo, Sabbir Hasan, Hritika Hasan, Navid Muntasir, Tasnuva Tisha, Jahangir, Shoriful, Aayat, Humaira Himu, Md. Saidur Rahman Pavel & others		
2020	Unoponchash Batash	Masud Hasan Ujjal	Imtiaz Barshon, Sharlin Farzana		
2021	Alatchakra: Circle of Desire	Habibur Rahman	Ahmed Rubel, Jaya Ahsan		
2021	Tumi Acho Tumi Nei	Delwar Jahan Jhantu	Asif Imrose, Prarthana Fardin Dighi, Simi Islam Koli		
2021	Raat Jaga Phool	Mir Sabbir	Mir Sabbir, Oishee, Tanvir, Fazlur Rahman Babu, Dilara Zaman, Rashed Mamun Apu, Joyraj		
2021	Laal Moroger Jhuti	Nurul Alam Atique	Ahmed Rubel, Dilruba Doyel, Bhabna, Shahjahan Samrat, Ashok Bepari, Shilpi Sarkar Apu, Joy Raj, Jyotika Jyoti etc.		
2022	Shaan	M. Raahim	Siam Ahmed, Puja Cherry, Taskeen Rahman, Misha Sawdagor, Don		
2022	Hawa	Mejbaur Rahman Sumon	Chanchal Chowdhury, Nazifa Tushi, Sariful Razz, Nasir Uddin Khan		
2022	Damal	Raihan Rafi	Siam Ahmed, Sariful Razz, Bidya Sinha Saha Mim, Shahnaz Sumi, Sumit Sengupta		
2023	Saatao	Khandaker Sumon	Fazlul Haque, Aynun Putul, Shrabani Das, Sabera Yasmin, Farruk Shiar Chinu, Shaakho Shahid		
2023	Adventure of Sundarbans	Abu Raihan Jewel	Siam Ahmed, Pori Moni, Abu Hurayra Tanvir		
2023	Sultanpur	Saikat Nasir	Ashish Khandokar, Sumon Faruque, Adhora Khan, Sanj John, Moumita Mou, Rashed Mamun Apu		
2023	Firey Dekha	Rozina	Nirob, Orchita Sporshia, Ilias Kanchan, Rozina		
2023	The Unwanted Twin	Nanziba Khan	Afsana Mimi, Dilara Zaman, Bonna Mirza, Bobby, Shams Sumon		
2023	Casino	Saikat Nasir	Nirob, Bubly, Taskeen Rahman		
2023	Prohelika	Chayanika Chowdhury	Mahfuz Ahmed, Shabnom Bubly, Nasir Uddin Khan, Rashed Mamun Apu		
2023	Mike	F. M. Shahin, Hassan Zafrul Bipul	Tariq Anam Khan, Ferdous, Tanvin Sweety, Nader Chowdhury, Jhuna Chowdhury and others.		
2023	1971 Shei Shob Din	Hridi Haq	Abul Hayat Mamunur Rashid, Jayanta Chattopadhyay, Munmun Ahmed, Shilpi Sarkar Apu, Ferdous, Shajal, Litu Anam, Saju Khadem, Sanjida Preeti and others.		
2023	Puff Daddy	Shahid-Un-Nabi and Mushfiqur Rahman Maznu	Shajal, Pori Moni, Azad Abul Kalam		
2023	Mujib: The Making of a Nation	Shyam Benegal	Arifin Shuvoo, Nusrat Imrose Tisha, Prarthona Fardin Dighi, Nusraat Faria, Riaz, Chanchal Chowdhury		
2024	Shyama Kabya	Badrul Anam Soud	Shohel Mondol, Neelanjona Neela, Intekhab Dinar, Jenny, Saju Khadem		
2024	Hubba	Bratya Basu	Mosharraf Karim, Indraneil Sengupta		
2024	Fatima	Drubo Hasan	Tasnia Farin, Yash Rohan		
2024	Female 4	Kajal Arefin Ome	Ziaul Haque Polash	Webfilm on Bongo BD	
2024	Moyurakkhi	Rashid Polash	Bobby Haque, Deep		
2024	Voyal	Biplob Hayder	Irfan Sajjad, Aisha Khan		
2024	Danger Zone	Belal Sani	Bappy Chowdhury, Falguni Rahman Jolly		
2024	Potu	Suzein Salam, Ahmed Humayun	Evan Sair, Afra Saiyara		
2024	Priyo Maloti	Shankha Dasgupta	Mehazabien Chowdhury		
2025	Moyna	Monjurul Islam Megh	Kayes Arju, Raj Ripa		
2025	Ali	Biplob Hayder	Irfan Sajjad, Melita Mehjabin, Arpa, Kazi Hayat, Misha Sawdagor, Shatabdi Wadud		
2026	Prince: Once Upon a Time in Dhaka	Abu Hayat Mahmud	Shakib Khan, Tasnia Farin, Jyotirmoyee Kundu, Dibyendu Bhattacharya, Nasir Uddin Khan, Intekhab Dinar		

== As producer ==
Year	Film	Director	Cast	Note	Ref.
2012	Bhalobasar Rong	Shaheen Sumon	Bappy Chowdhury, Mahiya Mahi		
2013	Onnorokom Bhalobasha	Shaheen Sumon	Bappy Chowdhury, Mahiya Mahi, Sara Zerin		
2013	PoraMon	Jakir Hossain Raju	Symon Sadik, Mahiya Mahi		
2013	Bhalobasa Aaj Kal	P. A. Kajol	Shakib Khan, Mahiya Mahi		
2013	Tobuo Bhalobashi	Montazur Rahman Akbar	Bappy Chowdhury, Mahiya Mahi		
2014	Agnee	Iftakar Chowdhury	Arifin Shuvoo, Mahiya Mahi		
2014	Dobir Saheber Songsar	Jakir Hossain Raju	Bappy Chowdhury, Mahiya Mahi, Asif Imrose		
2014	Honeymoon	Shafi Uddin Shafi	Bappy Chowdhury, Mahiya Mahi		
2014	Onek Sadher Moyna	Jakir Hossain Raju	Bappy Chowdhury Mahiya Mahi	Based on MoynaMoti (1969)	
2014	Desha: The Leader	Saikat Nasir	Shipan Mitra, Mahiya Mahi		
2015	Romeo vs Juliet	Abdul Aziz & Ashok Pati	Ankush & Mahiya Mahi		
2015	Agnee 2	Iftakar Chowdhury	Mahiya Mahi, Om		
2015	Aashiqui	Ashok Pati & Abdul Aziz	Ankush, Nusraat Faria, Moushumi		
2015	Lalchor	Nader Chowdhury	Anisur Rahman Milon, Mohona Mim, Nader Chowdhury		
2016	Angaar	Wazed Ali Sumon	Om, Jolly.		
2016	Hero 420	Saikat Nasir	Om, Nusraat Faria, Riya Sen		
2016	Onek Dame Kena	Zakir Hossain Raju	Mahiya Mahi, Bappy, Dipjol		
2016	Badsha: The Don	Baba Yadav	Jeet, Nusraat Faria, Shraddha Das	Remake of Telugu film Don Seenu (2010)	
2016	Shikari	Joydep Mukherjee & Abdul Aziz	Shakib Khan, Srabanti, Rahul Dev		
2016	Niyoti	Zakir Hossain Raju	Arifin Shuvoo, Jolly		
2016	Rokto	Wazed Ali Sumon	Roshan, Pori Moni		
2016	Prem Ki Bujhini	Sudipto Sarkar	Subhashree Ganguly, Om		
2017	Premi O Premi	Zakir Hossain Raju	Arifin Shuvoo, Nusraat Faria		
2017	Meyeti Ekhon Kothay Jabe	Nader Chowdhury	Shahriaz, Falguni Rahman Jolly		
2017	Dhat Teri Ki	Shamim Ahamed Roni	Arifin Shuvoo, Nusraat Faria, Roshan, Farin Khan		
2017	Nabab	Joydeep Mukherjee & Abdul Aziz	Shakib Khan, Subhashree Ganguly		
2017	Boss 2: Back to Rule	Baba Yadav, Abdul Aziz	Jeet, Subhashree Ganguly, Nusraat Faria		
2017	Doob: No Bed Of Roses	Mostofa Sarwar Farooki	Irrfan Khan, Nusrat Imrose Tisha		
2017	Detective	Tapan Ahmed	Arifin Shuvoo	Based on Rabindranath Tagore's short story with the same name	
2018	Inspector Notty K	Ashok Pati	Jeet, Nusraat Faria		
2018	Noor Jahaan	Abhimanyu Mukherjee	Adrit Roy & Puja Cherry Roy		
2018	Pashan	Saikat Nasir	Om, Bidya Sinha Mim, Bipasha Kabir, Misha Sawdagor		
2018	PoraMon 2	Raihan Rafi	Siam Ahmed, Puja Cherry Roy		
2018	Dahan	Raihan Rafi	Siam Ahmed, Puja Cherry Roy, Zakia Bari Momo, Fazlur Rahman Babu, Monira Mithu, Shimul Khan		
2019	Prem Amar 2	Bidula Bhattacharya	Puja Cherry Roy, Adrit Roy, Champa, Nader Chowdhury		
2019	Beporowa	Raja Chanda	Roshan, Bobby, Kazi Hayat, Tariq Anam Khan		
2023	Paap	Saikat Nasir	Roshan, Ariana Zaman, Bobby, Zakia Kamal Moon Maha		
2023	Sultanpur	Saikat Nasir	Sanj John, Adhora Khan		
2023	Jinn	Nader Chowdhury	Abdul Noor Shajal, Puja Cherry, Ziaul Roshan, Jannatun Nur Moon		
2024	Potu	Ahmed Humayun	Evan Sair, Afra Shaiara, Shoeb Monir, Dilruba Doyel		
2024	Mona: Jinn-2	Kamruzzaman Roman	Samina Bashar, Sazzad Hossain, Shehzad Omar		
2025	Jinn 3	Kamruzzaman Roman	Shajal Noor, Nusraat Faria		
2026	Masud Rana	Saikat Nasir	Russell Rana, Puja Cherry		
2026	Lojja	M H Khokon	Nusraat Faria, Azmeri Haque Badhon	Co-produced with Impress Telefilm	

== Awards and nominations ==
Year	Awards	Category	Film	Result
2013	Binodon Dhara Performance Award	Best Film Production House	—N/a	Won

== Controversies ==
Jaaz Multimedia's chairman Aziz has been a fugitive since 2019, when the Customs Intelligence and Investigation Department of the National Board of Revenue accused him of money laundering. During his rule, he threatened Dhallywood star Shakib Khan to kill. Shakib filed a case against five people including assistant director and Jaaz's then CEO Shish Monowar. Shish Manwar, the then CEO of Jaaz Multimedia, has been arrested over a case filled for kidnapping one of its staff on 2014.

== See also ==
- Cinema of Bangladesh
