= Badsha – The Don =

2016 Bengali film by Baba Yadav

- Theatrical release poster
- Directed by: Baba Yadav
- Written by: Anshuman Pratyush & Prameet
- Screenplay by: Anshuman Pratyush & Prameet
- Produced by: Himanshu Dhanuka; Abdul Aziz
- Starring: Jeet; Nusraat Faria; Shraddha Das; Ferdous
- Cinematography: P. Shelvakumar
- Edited by: Md. Kalam
- Music by: Suddho Roy; Akassh Sen
- Production companies: Eskay Movies; Jaaz Multimedia
- Distributed by: Eskay Movies; Jaaz Multimedia
- Release dates: 6 July 2016 (India); 7 July 2016 (Bangladesh)
- Running time: 146 minutes
- Countries: India; Bangladesh
- Language: Bengali
- Budget: ৳6 crore
- Box office: ৳6.4 crore

Badsha – The Don is a 2016 Indo-Bangladesh joint production action comedy film directed by Baba Yadav. It was produced by Eskay Movies and Jaaz Multimedia. It is a remake of the 2010 Telugu movie Don Seenu starring Ravi Teja. The film stars Jeet and Nusrat Faria. It is the third collaboration between Baba Yadav and Jeet after Boss: Born to Rule (2013) and Game (2014).

Except for the climax, the scenes of Mahesh Manjrekar were taken from the archival footage of the original version, which just led to a continuity error throughout the film. Released in July 2016, the film flopped at the box office in West Bengal but recovered its budget from its Bangladesh release.

== Cast ==
- Jeet as Badsha, a village boy of Jiagunj.
- Nusraat Faria as Shreya, Tony's sister
- Shraddha Das as Priya, Shreya's best friend and Johnny's sister
- Ferdous Ahmed as Jayanta alias Johnny Bhai
- Sushoma Sarkar as Badsha's sister
- Rajatava Dutta as Tarun alias Tony Bhai
- Mahesh Manjrekar as Shyam Bhai, underworld Don
- Biswanath Basu as Mantu aka Monty, Badsha's friend
- Raja Dutta as MLA's right hand
- Pradip Dhar as Tony's henchman
- Sumit Ganguly as Johnny's henchman

== Plot ==
The film follows the story of a boy who always wanted to be a Don from childhood. He reaches London, England, where he befriends a girl named Shreya and falls in love with her.

== Production and development ==
The muhurat of Badsha was in February 2016 in Kolkata. Ashok Dhanuka said shooting was due to start in May.

== Soundtrack ==
Badshah – The Don

Soundtrack album by Suddho Roy & Akassh Sen
- Released: 27 June 2016
- Recorded: 2015–2016
- Genre: Feature film soundtrack
- Length: 12:17
- Language: Bengali
- Labels: Eskay Movies; Jaaz Multimedia
- Producers: Himanshu Dhanuka; Abdul Aziz

Akassh Sen chronology
Angaar (2016)	Badshah – The Don (2016)	Rokto (2016)

Suddho Roy chronology
Badshah – The Don (2016)	Abhimaan (2016)

The soundtrack was released on 27 June 2016. Track listing via Saavn.

All lyrics are written by Priyo Chatterjee, Suddho Roy and Dipanjan; all music is composed by Suddho Roy and Akassh Sen.

Track Listing
No.	Title	Lyrics	Music	Singer(s)	Length
1.	"Dhat Teri Ki"	Priyo Chatterjee and Dipanjan	Suddho Roy	Divya Kumar and Shaberi Bhattacharya	3:45
2.	"Piya Tore Bina"	Suddho Roy & Dipanjan	Suddho Roy	Shadaab Hashmi	4:41
3.	"Mubarak Eid Mubarak"	Priyo Chatterjee	Akassh Sen	Akassh Sen	3:52
Total length:					12:17

== Accolades ==
Award Ceremony	Category	Nominee	Result	References
Filmfare Awards East	Best Choreography	"Dhat Teri Ki"	Nominated	
Tele Cine Awards	Best Actress (Bangladesh)	Nusrat Faria Mazhar	Won	
