= Biswanath Basu =

Indian actor

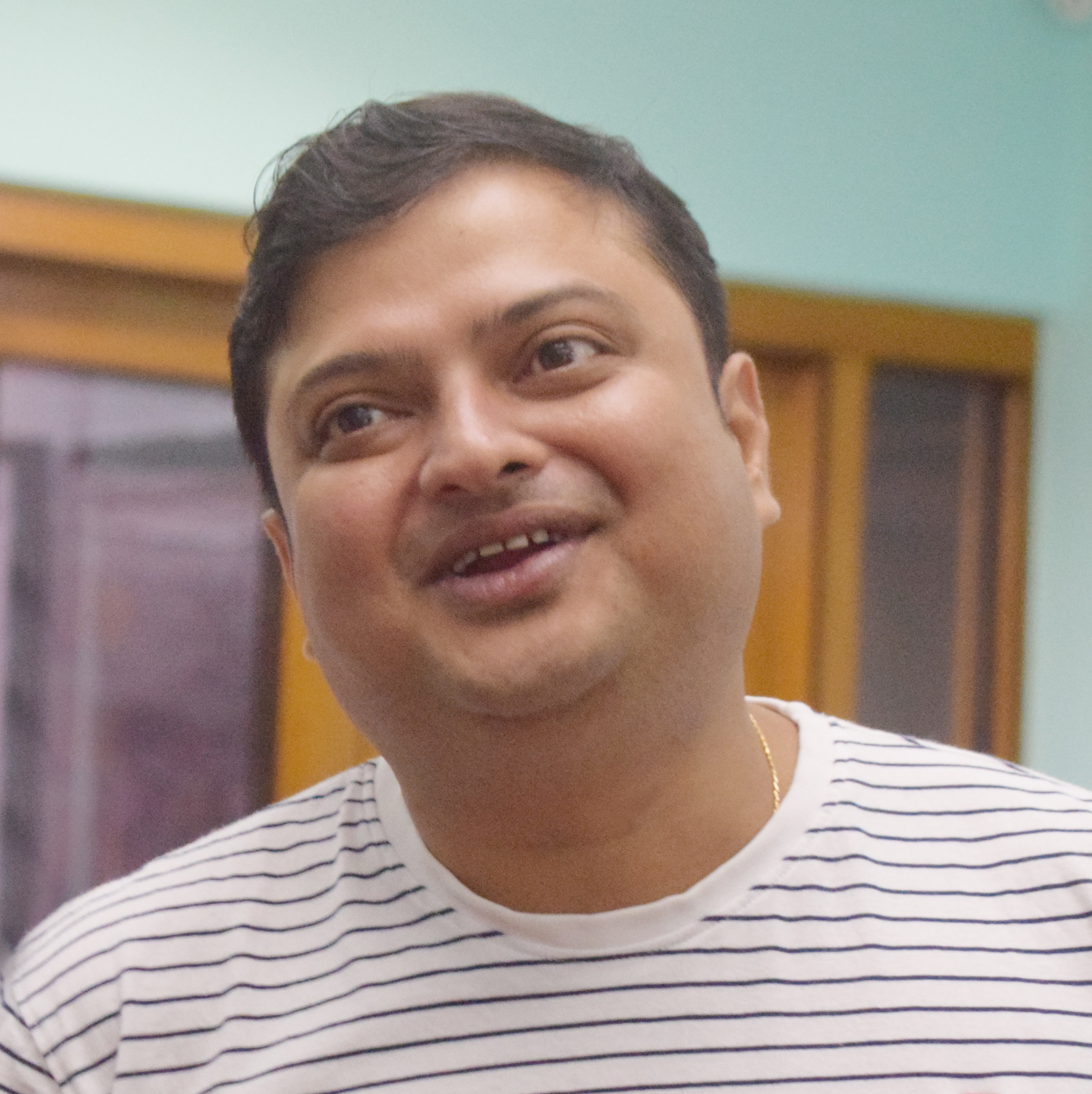
- Basu in 2019
- Born: Baduria, Basirhat, West Bengal, India
- Other names: Biswanath Bose
- Occupation: Actor

Biswanath Basu (or sometimes Biswanath Bose) is an Indian actor and comedian, who predominantly works in the Bengali film industry. In a career spanning over two decades, he has acted in over 80 films and is known for his comic roles.

== Filmography ==
Key

‡	Upcoming release

Films

Year	Film	Director	Role	Notes
2002	Ekjon Jhumur	Gautam Sen	Patla	
2002	Kurukhetra	Swapan Saha	Special appearance	
2003	Sabuj Saathi	Swapan Saha	Special appearance	
2003	Kartabya	Swapan Saha	Special appearance	
2003	Parampar	Pranab Kumar Das		
2004	Annay Attyachar	Swapan Saha		
2005	Dada	T.L.V Prasad		
2005	Sathi Aamar	Shankar Ray		
2006	Kranti	Riingo Banerjee	Iqbal	
2006	Abhinetri	Satabdi Roy		
2006	Herbert	Suman Mukhopadhyay	Gobindo	
2007	Kalishankar	Prashant Nanda	Bala Brahmachari	
2007	Sri Ramkrishna Vivekananda	Jogesh K. Mehta		
2007	Jiban Sathi	Shankar Ray		
2008	Bajimaat	Haranath Chakraborty	Subhra's friend	
2008	Aamar Pratigya	Swapan Saha		
2008	Bor Asbe Ekhuni	Rangan Chakraborty	Mitil's groom	
2009	Hanshi Khushi Club	Shankha Bandyopadhyay	Kobi	
2009	Premer Phande Kakatua	Swapan Saha		
2009	Mallick Bari	Anirban Chakraborty	Bratya	
2009	Chora Bali	Parthasarathi Joardar		
2009	Friend	Satabdi Roy		
2010	Le Chakka	Raj Chakraborty	Gour	
2010	Shukno Lanka	Gaurav Pandey		
2010	Kachhe Achho Tumi	Pallab Ghosh	Rohit's friend	
2010	Laboratory	Raja Sen		
2010	Tapur Tupur Brishti Pore	Amit Ghosh	James Potol	
2011	Fighter	Rabi Kinagi	Ice-Cream Boy	
2011	Uro Chithi	Kamaleshwar Mukherjee	Suhas	
2011	Hello Memsaheb	Shiboprosad Mukherjee, Nandita Roy	Aveek	
2012	Bedroom	Mainak Bhaumik	Deb's assistant	
2012	100% Love	Rabi Kinagi	Rahul's friend	
2012	Goraay Gondogol	Aniket Chattopadhyay		
2012	Comeback	Pallab Ghosh	Madan Mohon Mitra	
2012	Awara	Rabi Kinagi	Surya's friend	
2012	Paglu 2	Sujit Mondal	Dev's friend	
2012	Challenge 2	Raja Chanda	Film artist supplier	
2012	3 Kanya	Agnidev Chatterjee	Chintu	
2012	Tor Naam	Jai Shankar, Satabdi Das	Professor	
2012	Premleela	Goutam Majumdar		
2013	Megh Roddur	Surajit Dhar, Sudarshan Basu	Customer at Book Shop	
2013	Ami Aar Amar Girlfriends	Mainak Bhaumik		
2013	Adbhoot	Sayantan Mukherjee		
2013	Alik Sukh	Shiboprosad Mukherjee, Nandita Roy	Biswajit	
2013	Half Serious	Utsav Mukherjee	Debarshi	
2013	Boss: Born to Rule	Baba Yadav	Surya's Friend	
2013	Rangbaaz	Raja Chanda	Owner of Travel Agency	
2013	Ashchorjyo Prodeep	Anik Dutta	Bokbokdharmik	
2013	Khasi Katha– A Goat Saga	Judhajit Sarkar		
2014	Obhishopto Nighty	Birsa Dasgupta		
2014	Aak Ek Ke Dui	Drono Acharya		
2014	Aamar Aami	Orko Sinha	Subrata Mukherjee	
2014	Koyelaanchal	Ashu Trikha	Ghosh Babu	Hindi film
2015	Bawal The Film	Biswaroop Biswas	Heroine's Brother	
2015	Shudhu Tomari Jonyo	Birsa Dasgupta	Chandan	
2015	Black	Raja Chanda	Fake Doctor	
2015	Jamai 420	Ravi Kinagi	Sumanta	
2015	Swade Ahlade	Arindam Sil		
2016	Praktan	Shiboprosad Mukherjee, Nandita Roy	Ajay	
2016	Badsha – The Don	Baba Yadav	Monty, Badsha's friend	Indo-Bangladesh joint production
2016	Abhimaan	Raj Chakraborty	Khasnobis, Aditya's assistant	
2016	Haripad Bandwala	Pathikrit Basu	Mona	
2017	Nabab	Joydeep Mukherjee	Bimal Debnath, a superintendent of West Bengal police	
2017	Dhat Teri Ki	Shamim Ahmed Roni	Raj's Uncle	
2017	Boss 2: Back to Rule	Baba Yadav	Shibcharan Chowdhury	
2017	Biler Diary	Biswarup Biswas	Kanu Maharaj	
2017	Bibaho Diaries	Mainak Bhaumik	Lakshana	
2017	Chhutir Phande	Alok Roy		
2017	Jug Jug Jiyo	Shankar Ray		
2017	Path Ghat	Partha Ganguly		
2018	Inspector Notty K	Ashok Pati	Gutil	
2018	Ghare & Baire	Mainak Bhaumik	Bonto	
2018	Tui Sudhu Amar	Joydip Mukherjee		
2018	Ahare Mon	Pratim D. Gupta	Special appearance	
2018	Bagh Bondi Khela	Sujit Mondal	Police	
2019	Triangle	Anindya Sarkar	Rajdip Sen	
2019	Jonmodin	Arnab Chatterjee	Himself	Short film; Guest appearance
2020	Cholo Potol Tuli	Arindam Ganguly		
2021	Baazi	Anshuman Pratyush	Kancha	
2021	Avijatrik	Subhrajit Mitra	Sotu	
2021	Tonic	Abhijit Sen	Gourango: a caterer	
2021	Commando	Shamim Ahmed		
2022	Projapoti	Avijit Sen	Bishu, Joy's office colleague	
2023	Pradhan	Avijit Sen		
2024	Boomerang	Sauvik Kundu	Chang Lee, a Chinese agent	
2024	Dabaru	Pathikrit Basu	A neighbour	
2025	Killbill Society	Srijit Mukherji	Petkata Shaw	
2025	The Eken: Benaras e Bibhishika	Joydip Mukherjee	Sukhdev	
2025	Bagh: The Tiger	Sourish Dey		

== Television ==
Serial

Year	Serial	Role	Channel	Production House
2010–2012	Subarnalata	Probodh	Zee Bangla	Tron Videotrix Sarbari Ghoshal
2013–2015	Jol Nupur	Choton	Star Jalsha	Magic Moments Motion Pictures
2016–2017	Bhakter Bhogoban Shri Krishna	Kansa	Star Jalsha	Surinder Films
2017–2019	Jai Kali Kalkattawali	Khokan	Star Jalsha	Shree Venkatesh Films
2018–2019	Mayurpankhi	Poltu	Star Jalsha	Magic Moments Motion Pictures
2020–2021	Jibon Saathi	Bipin Sadukhan	Zee Bangla	Blues Productions
2021	Jamuna Dhaki	Pobon Dhaki	Zee Bangla	Blues Productions
2021	Mon Phagun	Paritosh Hazra	Star Jalsha	Acropoliis Entertainment
2021	Karunamoyee Rani Rashmoni	Nagen Choudhury	Zee Bangla	Zee Bangla Production
2022	Pilu	Uday Narayan Mukhopadhyay	Zee Bangla	Zee Bangla Production
2022	Bodhisattwor Bodhbuddhi	Pramathanath Mukherjee	Zee Bangla	Surinder Fims
2023– 2024	Neem Phooler Modhu	Priyotosh Basu	Zee Bangla	Zee Bangla Production
2025–2026	Sriman Bhogoban Das	Bhogoban Das	Zee Bangla Sonar	Ideas Creation

Television Programme

1. Bhyabachaka as Anchor
2. Ghore Ghore Zee Bangla as Anchor
