= Abdul Aziz (filmmaker) =

Bangladeshi film producer and script writer

- আব্দুল আজিজ
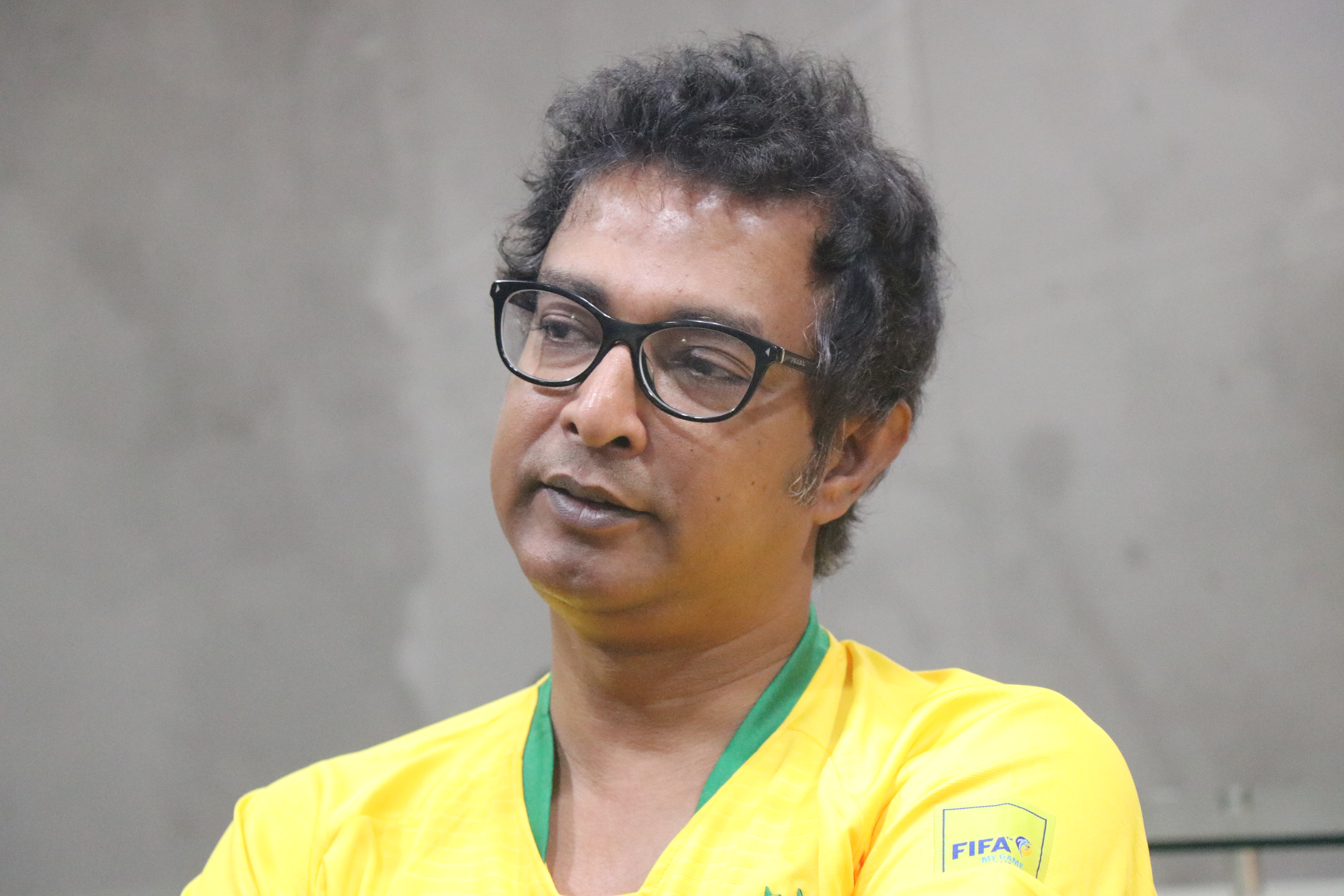
- Aziz in 2018
- Born: Dhaka, Bangladesh
- Occupations: Film producer; Script writer
- Years active: 2013– present
- Employer: Jaaz Multimedia
- Children: 2
- Awards: Moscow Film Festival Prize for Best Film

Abdul Aziz is a Bangladeshi film producer and script writer. He is the chairman of Jaaz Multimedia. He produced more than 40 films in Bangladesh and India.

Aziz has been a fugitive since 2019, when the Customs Intelligence and Investigation Department of the National Board of Revenue accused him of money laundering. Cases have also been filed against him for embezzlement. He has reportedly been living in Canada or Malaysia. In the year of 2021, Jazz multimedia announced that, it would make 3 films which would cost more than 3.5 crores.

== Filmography ==
=== Producer ===
Key	†	Denotes films that have not yet been released

Year	Film	Cast	Notes
2013	PoraMon	Symon, Mahiya Mahi	
2014	Agnee	Arifin Shuvoo, Mahiya Mahi	
2014	Onek Sadher Moyna	Bappy Chowdhury, Mahiya Mahi	Remake of MoynaMoti (1969)
2014	Desha: The Leader	Shipan Mitra, Mahiya Mahi	It won four National Film Awards.
2015	Romeo vs Juliet	Ankush Hazra, Mahiya Mahi	Indo-Bangladesh joint production
2015	Agnee 2	Mahiya Mahi, Om	Indo-Bangladesh joint production
2015	Aashiqui	Ankush Hazra, Nusraat Faria Mazhar	Indo-Bangladesh joint production
2016	Angaar	Om, Falguni Rahman Jolly	Indo-Bangladesh joint production
2016	Hero 420	Om, Nusraat Faria Mazhar, Riya Sen	Remake of Telugu film Maska (2009), Indo-Bangladesh joint production
2016	Shikari	Shakib Khan, Srabanti Chatterjee	Remake of Tamil film Aadhavan (2009), Indo-Bangladesh joint production
2016	Niyoti	Arifin Shuvoo, Falguni Rahman Jolly	Indo-Bangladesh joint production
2016	Rokto	Pori Moni, Ziaul Roshan	Indo-Bangladesh joint production
2016	Prem Ki Bujhini	Om Subhashree Ganguly	Remake of Telugu film 100% Love (2011), Indo-Bangladesh joint production
2017	Premi O Premi	Arifin Shuvoo, Nusraat Faria	
2017	Meyeti Ekhon Kothay Jabe	Falguni Rahman Jolly	
2017	Dhat Teri Ki	Arifin Shuvoo, Nusraat Faria, Ziaul Roshan, Farin Khan	Remake of Punjabi movie Carry On Jatta
2017	Nabab	Shakib Khan, Subhashree Ganguly	Indo-Bangladesh joint production

== Controversy ==
Aziz has been a fugitive since 2019, when the Customs Intelligence and Investigation Department of the National Board of Revenue accused him of money laundering. During his rule, he threatened Dhallywood star Shakib Khan to kill. Shakib filed a case against five people including assistant director and Jaaz's then CEO Shish Monowar. Shish Manwar, the then CEO of Jaaz Multimedia, has been arrested over a case filled for kidnapping one of its staff on 2014.
