= Jinn 3 =

2025 Bangladeshi horror film by Kamruzzaman Roman

- theatrical release poster
- Bengali: জ্বীন ৩
- Directed by: Kamruzzaman Roman
- Screenplay by: Abdul Aziz
- Story by: Abdul Aziz
- Produced by: Syed Nirob
- Starring: Shajal Noor; Nusraat Faria
- Cinematography: Ismail Hossain Liton
- Edited by: Mostakim Suzon
- Music by: Anjela Monjur
- Production company: Jaaz Multimedia
- Distributed by: Jaaz Multimedia
- Release date: March 31, 2025
- Running time: 136 minutes
- Country: Bangladesh
- Language: Bengali
- Budget: approx. ৳2 crore

Jinn 3 is a 2025 Bengali-language Bangladeshi horror film. Produced under the banner of Jaaz Multimedia, the story, screenplay, and dialogues have been written by Abdul Aziz, while Kamruzzaman Roman has directed the film. The lead roles are played by Sajal Noor and Nusraat Faria.

The film was released in theaters on 31 March 2025 and received mixed reviews from the audience. However, the film was pulled from Star Cineplex within two weeks due to low audience demand compared to other films released on Eid.

== Plot ==
As a man of science, Bijoy seeks to analyse the incident through the lens of reality. However, from the moment he arrives in the village, he begins to encounter a series of strange and inexplicable events. Eventually, he too becomes entangled in the web of mystery and can no longer distinguish between what is real and what is imagined.

== Cast ==
- Shajal Noor as Bijoy
- Nusraat Faria as Faria
- Tania Ahmmed
- Sumon
- Nabil Ahmed Niloy
- Nader Chowdhury
- Mostafa Hira
- Amin Sarkar

== Production ==
The first installment, Jinn, was released in 2023, followed by the second chapter, Mona: Jinn-2, in 2024. Then came the third film in the Jinn series, titled Jinn 3. It is claimed that the movie is inspired by real events that took place in Mymensingh.

Although it was initially announced during filming that Abdun Noor Sajal had joined the project, the name of Nusraat Faria as the lead actress was revealed only after the film was completed. With this film, Nusraat Faria returns to Jaaz Multimedia after seven years.

== Music ==
The song, titled "Kanya", was written by Rabiul Islam Jibon and sung by Imran Mahmudul and Dilshad Nahar Kona. The song was viewed more than 10 million times on YouTube in twenty days.

No.	Title	Singer(s)	Length
1.	"Konna (কন্যা)"	Imran; Kona	03:39
2.	"Byabodhan (ব্যাবধান)"	Kheya	03:30
Total length:			07:09

Jinn 3 (Urdu version)
No.	Title	Singer(s)	Length
1.	"Husna"	Khushboo; Sriben	3:28
2.	"Fasilah"	Khushboo	3:18
Total length:			6:46

== Release ==
The film was released in Bangladeshi cinemas on 31 March 2025, on the occasion of Eid-ul-Fitr, clashing with Borbaad, Jongli, Daagi, Chokkor 302, and Antaratma.

A press conference for the film, Jinn 3, announced that it would be released on iScreen within 4 months of its theatrical release.
