= Aashiqui (2015 film) =

2015 Indo-Bangladeshi film by Ashok Pati

Aashiqui: True Love
- Directed by: Ashok Pati
- Written by: Pele Bhattacharya
- Produced by: Ashok Dhanuka; Himanshu Dhanuka; Abdul Aziz (co-producer)
- Starring: Ankush Hazra; Nusrat Faria; Arindam Dutta; Moushumi; Rajatava Dutta
- Cinematography: Kumud Verma
- Edited by: Somnath Dey
- Music by: Savvy Gupta
- Production companies: Eskay Movies; Jaaz Multimedia (co-producer)
- Distributed by: Eskay Movies; Jaaz Multimedia
- Release dates: 18 September 2015 (India); 25 September 2015 (Bangladesh)
- Countries: India; Bangladesh
- Language: Bengali

Aashiqui: True Love is a 2015 Indo-Bangladesh joint production romantic drama film directed by Ashok Pati and produced by Eskay Movies and co-produced by Jaaz Multimedia. The film stars Ankush Hazra and Nusrat Faria Mazhar in lead roles, and Moushumi in a supporting role.

An Indo-Bangladesh joint production, it is a remake of the 2012 Telugu romantic film Ishq. The working title was Premi O Premi. It was shot entirely in the United Kingdom, including Scotland, and was released on 18 September 2015.

== Plot ==
Rahul and Shruti fall in love without knowing anything about each other's past. Eventually, that unknown past returns to their lives, revealing a hidden connection between them. As the truth unfolds, it begins to influence their relationship and challenges their ability to move forward together.

== Cast ==
- Ankush Hazra as Rahul
- Nusrat Faria as Shruti
- Arindam Dutta as Joy
- Moushumi as Arpita
- Rajatava Dutta
- Sourav Das
- Rebeka Rouf
- Cali Nelle as Bosco

== Soundtrack ==
Aashiqui: True Love

Soundtrack album by Savvy Gupta
- Released: 2015
- Genre: Feature film soundtrack
- Length: 19:00
- Labels: Jaaz Music; Eskay Music
- Producers: Abdul Aziz; Ashok Dhanuka

All music is composed by Savvy Gupta.

Track Listing:
No.	Title	Lyrics	Music	Artist(s)	Length
1.	"Tor Aashiqui"	Prasen (Prasenjit Mukherjee)	Savvy Gupta	Jubin Nautiyal	4:01
2.	"Meyeder Mon Bojha"	Prasen	Savvy Gupta	Savvy and Dilshad Nahar Kona	3:24
3.	"Topor Mathae"	Riddhi Barua and Savvy Gupta	Savvy Gupta	Nakash Aziz	4:12
4.	"Ei Aashiqui"	Prasen	Savvy Gupta	Mohammed Irfan and Akriti Kakkar	3:09
5.	"Brishti Bheja"	Anyaman Bannerjee and Savvy Gupta	Savvy Gupta	Shadaab Hashmi	4:13
Total length:					19:00
