= Indo-Bangladesh joint production =

India and Bangladesh joint production films

This article describes films made jointly by cinema production houses of India, typically West Bengal (Tollywood Bengali cinema), and Bangladesh (Dhallywood Bengali cinema), sometimes Maharashtra (Bollywood Hindi cinema)

== History ==
In the 1980s and 1990s, there was a significant number of Indo-Bangladesh joint production films. However, after 2004–2005, the number of Indo-Bangla joint production films decreased. However, in the 2010s, Indo-Bangladeshi joint ventures began gaining more popularity and have become more common, often produced by Eskay Movies of India and Jaaz Multimedia of Bangladesh.

However, after different controversies regarding the joint venture films in 2017, the government of Bangladesh have temporarily stopped all joint ventures until a new policy is put in place. The controversy is mainly about the production house Jaaz Multimedia and the films they have produced, which commonly feature more Indian cast and crew than Bangladeshis. In an article by Prothom Alo, this controversy has been described as creating two factions in the Bangladeshi film industry, one which claims that Jaaz Multimedia has broken the country's rules of international co-productions by making Indian films under the name of joint productions, and another which backs Jaaz Multimedia by claiming that their films are reviving the lost glory of Bangladeshi cinema.

After the Bangladesh government announced it was temporarily stopping all joint production films in 2017, it was announced that a new committee would be formed to approve scripts and preview the films before production and release. Later in January 2018, Bangladesh Information Minister Hasanul Haq Inu revealed that new rules for would be relaxed for co-productions, making it easier for films to have one director and film in other countries. The new co-production guidelines, released by the Bangladeshi government, state that permission can be sought to bring equipments from other countries, a production house cannot apply for a film review within 30 days of getting a nod from the Bangladesh Film Development Corporation and Ministry of Information, maximum duration of submission is 9 months to a year, and the guidelines also allow for a director or producer from a third country to join the film. However, the new guidelines for the co-productions state that approval will only be given to original content. This move, endorsed by director of Grassroot Entertainment Amit Jumrani, will create space for new and original ideas in an industry with many remakes.

== Films ==
This is the list of some of the notable Bangladesh-India joint venture films.

Year	Films	Director	Cast (India)	Cast (Bangladesh)	Production company (India)	Production company (Bangladesh)	Language (Release)	Notes	Ref.
1973	Dhire Bohe Meghna	Alamgir Kabir	Hasu Bandyopadhyay	Babita, Ajmal Huda, Anwar Hossain, Golam Mustafa		Bangladesh Films International	Bengali (Bangladesh, West Bengal, Assam and Tripura)	First film of Indo-Bangladesh joint production	
1973	Titash Ekti Nadir Naam	Ritwik Ghatak	Ritwik Ghatak	Rosy Samad Kabori Choudhury Rowshan Jamil Rani Sarkar	West Bengal Film Development Corporation	Purba Pran Kathachitra	Bengali (Bangladesh, West Bengal, Assam and Tripura)	Adaption of Titash Ekti Nadir Naam	
1985	Anyay Abichar	Shakti Samanta	Mithun Chakraborty Utpal Dutt	Rozina Nuton	Shakti Films	Chitrangan	Bengali (Bangladesh, West Bengal, Assam and Tripura)	Adaptation of Jowar Bhata	
1992	Padma Nadir Majhi	Goutam Ghose	Utpal Dutt Roopa Ganguly	Raisul Islam Asad Champa	West Bengal Film Development Corporation	Ashirbad Chalachitra	Bengali (Bangladesh, West Bengal, Assam and Tripura)	Adaption of Padma Nadir Majhi	
1998	Moner Moto Mon	Montazur Rahman Akbar	Victor Beneerjee	Amin Khan	AP Production	Bony Pictures	Bengali (Bangladesh, West Bengal, Assam and Tripura)	Released in Odia-language as Raja Rani	
2003	Moner Majhe Tumi	Motiur Rahman Panu	Jisshu Sengupta	Riaz Purnima	Padmalaya Studios	Anandamela Chalochitra Ltd	Bengali (Bangladesh, West Bengal, Assam and Tripura)	Remake of Manasantha Nuvve	
2010	Moner Manush	Goutam Ghose	Prosenjit Chatterjee Priyanshu Chatterjee	Chanchal Chowdhury Raisul Islam Asad	Rosevalley Films Ltd	Impress Telefilm Ltd	Bengali (Bangladesh, West Bengal, Assam and Tripura)	Based on life of Lalon	
2014	Ami Shudhu Cheyechi Tomay	Ashok Pati	Ankush Hazra Subhashree Ganguly	Misha Sawdagor, Don	Eskay Movies	Action Cut Entertainment	Bengali (Bangladesh, West Bengal, Assam and Tripura)		
2015	Romeo vs Juliet	Ashok Pati	Ankush Hazra	Mahiya Mahi	Eskay Movies	Jaaz Multimedia	Bengali (Bangladesh, West Bengal, Assam and Tripura)	Remake of Singh vs Kaur	
2015	Agnee 2	Iftakar Chowdhury	Om	Mahiya Mahi	Eskay Movies	Jaaz Multimedia	Bengali (Bangladesh, West Bengal, Assam and Tripura)	Sequel to Agnee	
2015	Aashiqui	Ashok Pati	Ankush Hazra	Nusrat Faria Mazhar	Eskay Movies	Jaaz Multimedia	Bengali (Bangladesh, West Bengal, Assam and Tripura)	Remake of Ishq	
2016	Angaar	Wajed Ali Sumon	Om	Falguni Rahman Jolly	Eskay Movies	Jaaz Multimedia	Bengali (Bangladesh, West Bengal, Assam and Tripura)	Remake of Appayya	
2016	Hero 420	Saikat Nasir	Om Riya Sen	Nusrat Faria Mazhar	Eskay Movies	Jaaz Multimedia	Bengali (Bangladesh, West Bengal, Assam and Tripura)	Remake of Maska	
2016	Shankhachil	Goutam Ghose	Prosenjit Chatterjee	Kusum Sikder	NIdeas Creations & Productions	Impress Telefilm Ltd & Ashirbad Cholochitra	Bengali (Bangladesh, West Bengal, Assam and Tripura)		
2016	Niyoti	Jakir Hossain Raju	Ishani Ghosh, Mousumi Saha, Supriyo Dutta	Arifin Shuvo Falguni Rahman Jolly	Eskay Movies	Jaaz Multimedia	Bengali (Bangladesh, West Bengal, Assam and Tripura)	Inspired by The Notebook	
2016	Badsha - The Don	Baba Yadav Abdul Aziz	Jeet	Nusrat Faria Mazhar	Eskay Movies	Jaaz Multimedia	Bengali (Bangladesh, West Bengal, Assam and Tripura)	Remake of Don Seenu	
2016	Shikari	Joydeep Mukherjee Zakir Hussain Simanto	Srabanti Chatterjee	Shakib Khan	Eskay Movies	Jaaz Multimedia	Bengali (Bangladesh, West Bengal, Assam and Tripura)	Remake of Aadhavan	
2016	Rokto	Wajed Ali Sumon	Ashish Vidyarthi	Pori Moni Ziaul Roshan	Eskay Movies	Jaaz Multimedia	Bengali (Bangladesh, West Bengal, Assam and Tripura)	Inspired from The Long Kiss Goodnight	
2016	Prem Ki Bujhini	Sudipto Sarkar	Om Subhashree Ganguly		Eskay Movies	Jaaz Multimedia	Bengali (Bangladesh, West Bengal, Assam and Tripura)	Remake of 100% Love	
2017	Boss 2: Back to Rule	Baba Yadav	Jeet Subhashree Ganguly	Nusrat Faria Mazhar	Jeetz Filmworks Walzen Media Works	Jaaz Multimedia	Bengali (Bangladesh, West Bengal, Assam and Tripura)	Sequel to Boss: Born to Rule	
2017	Nabab	Joydeep Mukherjee Abdul Aziz	Subhashree Ganguly	Shakib Khan	Eskay Movies	Jaaz Multimedia	Bengali (Bangladesh, West Bengal, Assam and Tripura)		
2017	Doob: No Bed of Roses	Mostofa Sarwar Farooki	Irrfan Khan	Nusrat Imrose Tisha	Eskay Movies Irrfan Khan Films	Jaaz Multimedia	Bengali (Bangladesh, West Bengal, Assam and Tripura)		
2018	Inspector Notty K	Ashok Pati	Jeet	Nusrat Faria Mazhar	Surinder Films Jeetz Filmworks Walzen Media Works	Jaaz Multimedia	Bengali (Bangladesh, West Bengal, Assam and Tripura)	Remake of Jatt & Juliet 2; releasing in Bangladesh as Indian film through import-export policy	
2018	Noor Jahaan	Abhimanyu Mukherjee	Adrit Roy	Puja Cherry	Raj Chakraborty Productions SVF Entertainment	Jaaz Multimedia	Bengali (Bangladesh, West Bengal, Assam and Tripura)		
2018	Pashan	Saikat Nasir	Om	Bidya Sinha Saha Mim		Jaaz Multimedia	Bengali (Bangladesh, West Bengal, Assam and Tripura)		
2018	Chalbaaz	Joydeep Mukherjee Anonno Mamun	Subhashree Ganguly	Shakib Khan	Eskay Movies	Action Cut Entertainment	Bengali (Bangladesh, West Bengal, Assam and Tripura)		
2018	Sultan: The Saviour	Raja Chanda	Jeet	Bidya Sinha Saha Mim	Surinder Films Jeetz Filmworks	Jaaz Multimedia	Bengali (Bangladesh, West Bengal, Assam and Tripura)		
2018	Bhaijaan Elo Re	Joydeep Mukherjee	Srabanti Chatterjee Payel Sarkar	Shakib Khan	Eskay Movies	Action Cut Entertainment	Bengali (Bangladesh, West Bengal, Assam and Tripura)		
2018	Naqaab	Rajiv Biswas	Nusrat Jahan Sayantika Banerjee	Shakib Khan	Shree Venkatesh Films	Aradhona Enterprise	Bengali (Bangladesh, West Bengal, Assam and Tripura)	Remake of Massu Engira Masilamani	
2018	Tui Shudhu Amar	Joydeep Mukherjee Anonno Mamun	Om Soham Chakraborty	Mahiya Mahi	Eskay Movies	Action Cut Entertainment	Bengali (Bangladesh, West Bengal, Assam and Tripura)		
2018	Saturday Afternoon	Mostofa Sarwar Farooki	Parambrata Chatterjee	Zahid Hasan Nusrat Imon Tisha	Greentouch Entertainment	Jaaz Multimedia Chhobial	Bengali (Bangladesh, West Bengal, Assam and Tripura)	Co-produced by Anna Katchko of Germany company Tandem Production Also starring Palestinian actor Eyad Hourani	
2019	Tui Amar Rani	Pijush Saha & Sajal Ahmed	Rubel Das, Rajesh Sharma, Supriyo Dutta	Misty Jannat, Abu Hena Rony	Prince Entertainment P4	Hevean Multimedia	Bengali (Bangladesh, West Bengal, Assam and Tripura)		
2019	Prem Amar 2	Bidula Bhattacharya	Adrit Roy	Puja Cherry	SVF	Jaaz Multimedia	Bengali (Bangladesh, West Bengal)	Sequel of Prem Aamar	
2024	Dard	Anonno Mamun	Sonal Chauhan, Payel Sarkar, Rahul Dev	Shakib Khan	Eskay Movies One World Movies	Action Cut Entertainment Kibria Films	Bengali (India and Bangladesh)		
2025	Borbaad	Mehedi Hassan Hridoy	Idhika Paul, Jisshu Sengupta	Shakib Khan, Misha Sawdagor	Ridhi Sidhi Entertainment	Real Energy Production	Bengali (Bangladesh, West Bengal		
TBA	Balighar †	Arindam Sil	Abir Chatterjee Parno Mitra Rahul Banerjee	Arifin Shuvo Nusrat Imrose Tisha Quazi Nawshaba Ahmed	Nothing Beyond Cinema	Bengal Creations	Bengali (Bangladesh, West Bengal, Assam and Tripura)		

== Frequent joint venture collaborators ==
This list contains production companies, directors, and actors who have worked multiple times in Indo-Bangla co-productions.

=== Production companies ===
Company	Films Released	Country
Jaaz Multimedia	16	Bangladesh
Eskay Movies	14	India
Impress Telefilm Ltd	4	Bangladesh
Jeetz Filmworks	2	India
Walzen Media Works	2	India
Action Cut Entertainment	5	Bangladesh
SVF Entertainment	1	India
Chorki	1	Bangladesh
Alpha-i Studios	1	Bangladesh
Real Energy Production	1	Bangladesh
Ridhi Sidhi Entertainment	1	India

=== Directors ===
Director	Films Released	Country
Ashok Pati	4	India
Goutam Ghosh	3	India
Joydeep Mukherjee	3	India
Baba Yadav	2	India
Abdul Aziz	2	Bangladesh
Wajed Ali Sumon	2	Bangladesh

=== Actors ===
Actor/Actress	Films Released	Country
Shakib Khan	7	Bangladesh
Om	6	
Nusraat Faria	5	Bangladesh
Subhashree Ganguly	5	India
Jeet	4	India
Ankush Hazra	3	India
Mahiya Mahi	3	Bangladesh
Prosenjit Chatterjee	2	India

=== Music directors ===
Music director	Soundtracks Released	Country	Note
Savvy	11	India	Has released collaborative soundtracks with other artists.
Akassh	8	India	Has released collaborative soundtracks with other artists.
Goutam Ghosh	3	India	
Suddho Roy	2	India	Has released collaborative soundtracks with other artists.
Dabbu	1	India	Has released collaborative soundtracks with other artists.
