= Boss 2: Back to Rule =

2017 Bengali action thriller film

- Theatrical release poster
- Directed by: Baba Yadav
- Written by: Anshuman & Prameet
- Screenplay by: Anshuman & Prameet
- Story by: Jeet
- Produced by: Jeet; Abdul Aziz (co-producer)
- Starring: Jeet; Subhashree Ganguly; Nusrat Faria
- Narrated by: Sabyasachi Chakraborty
- Cinematography: P. Shelvakumar
- Edited by: Md. Kalam
- Music by: Jeet Gannguli
- Production companies: Jeetz Filmworks; Jaaz Multimedia (Bangladesh); Walzen Media Works
- Distributed by: Eros International; Jaaz Multimedia (Bangladesh); Grassroot Entertainment
- Release dates: 23 June 2017 (West Bengal); 26 June 2017 (Bangladesh)
- Countries: Bangladesh; India
- Language: Bengali
- Budget: ৳5 crore
- Box office: ₹10.5 crore

Boss 2: Back to Rule is a 2017 India-Bangladesh joint production Bengali action thriller film directed by Baba Yadav and story written by Jeet. It is a sequel to his 2013 film, Boss: Born to Rule and the second installment of the Boss film series. The film features Jeet, Subhashree Ganguly and Bangladeshi actress Nusraat Faria in the leading roles. Jeet Gannguli composed the music for the film. The film was released in West Bengal on 23 June and in Bangladesh on 26 June 2017, and in the rest of India on 30 June 2017. It is the eighth highest grossing Indian Bengali film of all time.

== Plot ==
The story continues 4 years after the incidents of Boss: Born to Rule that took place in 2013. In 2017, Surya, a public figure, is now hated by the people due to the disappearance of their money (worth ₹35000 crores) kept in the Business bank headquarters, a bank built by Surya for his people. Surya's loved person, Chief Minister of Maharashtra Gopinath Shivalkar, who was previously mayor of Mumbai, was killed by an unknown person due to various enmities. Surya was forced to leave India due to repeated threats by the people and the police, where he dressed as a rock musician and sneaked into Dhaka, to look for Prince Shahnawaz Hussain, who had earlier promised to donate a huge sum for his company Surya Industries, but later discovers that he betrayed him and went to Bangkok.

In Dhaka, Aisha, who is Shahnawaz's daughter, helped Surya to overcome various problems and come to Bangkok. In Bangkok, it is revealed that Bidyut Shivalkar, Gopinath's son, whom Surya had believed to be his friend due to his enormous contributions to his industry, was the one who tricked Surya by stealing all the money in the bank to become wealthy. Bidyut was also the man who killed his father by gunfire due to greed for the property and the people who helped him were Prince Shahnawaz Hussain and Gopinath's politician friend Jagadish Kumar with the same intention.

Surya escapes from them, where he is soon able to kill Shahnawaz with the help of Aisha, who hates her father for killing many people, including her mother. Surya also is able to fatally poison Avinash while asleep despite huge security, but Bidyut captures Aisha and Surya's lover Rusha. However, Surya is able to save them and gets hold of Bidyut, where he is also able to win back the lost money. Bidyut is sent to prison while Surya is able to bring back the people's trust and also criticizes them for losing their trust on him.

== Cast ==
- Jeet as a small business tycoon Surya, who aspires to work at the national level with the help of ministers
- Subhashree Ganguly as Rusha Roy, Surya's fiancé
- Nusraat Faria as Aisha Hussain: The daughter of Prince Shahnawaz Hussain
- Chiranjeet Chakraborty as Mumbai Police Commissioner Vinayak Roy
- Indraneil Sengupta as Bidyut Shivalkar, Gopinath's son, the main antagonist
- Supriyo Dutta as Chief Minister Gopinath Shivalkar, Bidyut's father
- Biswanath Basu as Shibcharan Chowdhury
- Kaushik Sen as Deputy Chief Minister Jagadish Kumar
- Amit Hasan as Prince Shahnawaz Hussain, a corrupt Bangladeshi businessman
- Pradip Dhar as constable Tukaram Apte
- Sabyasachi Chakraborty as the narrator
- Kanchan Mullick as a stuntman (cameo)
- Somnath Kar as Shakeel, Surya's henchman
- Vashkar Dev as inspector Bharat Patnaik, Vinayak's junior officer and sub-ordinate

== Production ==
Boss 2: Back To Rule is an Indo-Bangla joint production involving Jeet's new production company Jeetz Filmworks, Walzen Media Works and Jaaz Multimedia. It is a sequel to the 2013 film Boss: Born to Rule. Principal photography was underway in Kolkata in February 2017. The story of the film written by Jeet himself. With the budget of ₹5.0 crore the film become one of the most expensive Bengali film.

== Controversy ==
After being uploaded on to Jaaz Multimedia's YouTube channel, the song "Allah Meherbaan" ("By the Grace of Allah") stirred up controversy due to its title being perceived as an Islamic song. Nusrat was criticised for appearing in revealing costumes in the music video. After viewing the video, advocate Md Azizul Bashar, for a publicity stunt, claimed he was 'embarrassed' after allegedly mistaking the song to be a religious song. A legal notice, on behalf of Bashar, was sent by Supreme Court lawyer Md Hujjatul Islam Khan to Jaaz Multimedia for 'hurting the religious sentiments of everyone' by releasing a 'disgraceful' song before the month of Ramadan. The notice gave three days to remove the song from YouTube and other social media networks. After the notice was sent, Jaaz Multimedia removed the music video from their YouTube channel.

Another controversy came from Bangladesh towards the film, this time regarding the joint production between Bangladesh and India. According to the joint production rules of Bangladesh, the film must share half of the actors from either country. The preliminary preview committee of the censor board raised the allegation after reviewing the film. After reviewing the film, the chief of the committee and managing director of the BFDC (Bangladesh Film Development Organization), Tapan Kumar Ghosh, told me this."Most of the artistes in the film are from India. It seems to me that in the case of actors, the principles of a joint production have not been followed," Tapan Kumar Ghosh said. After a few weeks of protests, the Censor Board gave clearance to the films to release, in time to release on the holiday of Eid.

== Soundtrack ==
Boss 2: Back to Rule

Soundtrack album by Jeet Gannguli
- Released: 9 June 2017
- Recorded: 2017
- Genre: Feature film soundtrack
- Length: 12:21
- Language: Bengali
- Label: Jaaz Music; Grassroot Entertainment
- Producer: Jeet; Abdul Aziz

Jeet Gannguli chronology
Love Express (2016)	Boss 2: Back to Rule (2017)	Chaamp (2017)

Singles from Boss 2: Back to Rule
- 1. "Yaara Meherbaan" Released: 13 Jun 2017; 2. "Ureche Mon" Released: 3 Jun 2017; 3. "Boss 2 (Title Track)" Released: 10 Jun 2017

All lyrics are written by Priyo Chattopadhyay & Pranjal; all music is composed by Jeet Gannguli.

Track listing
No.	Title	Lyrics	Singer(s)	Length
1.	"Boss 2 (Title Track)"	Priyo Chattopadhyay	Amit Mishra	4:17
2.	"Ureche Mon"	Pranjal	Arijit Singh	4:41
3.	"Yaara Meherbaan"	Pranjal	Nakash Aziz & Jonita Gandhi	3:23
Total length:				12:21

=== Yaara Meherbaan ===
After the backlash in Bangladesh against the release of the song "Allah Meherbaan", Jaaz Multimedia received a legal notice and removed the music video from their YouTube channel. On 13 June, Jaaz Multimedia released an updated version of the song with rewritten lyrics onto their YouTube channel. The new version of the song on YouTube is titled "Yaara Meherbaan". Grassroot Entertainment also removed the original song from their YouTube channel and replaced it with "Yaara Meherbaan". However, the single and soundtrack released on different platforms such as iTunes, Spotify, and Saavn all retain the original "Allah Meherbaan" song.

== Reception ==
The film opened to huge response from the audience and mixed reviews from the critics. The film become huge success in box office and mostly in Bangladesh where Jeet's has large fanbase. The film collected ₹10.50 crore at the box office and the second highest grossing Bengali film in 2017.
