= Potu (film) =

2024 Bangladeshi film

- Film poster
- Directed by: Suzein Salam, Ahmed Humayun
- Produced by: Jaaz Multimedia
- Starring: Evan Sair; Afra Shaiara; Shoaib Monir
- Cinematography: Sani Khan
- Edited by: Zahir Monon
- Music by: Ahmed Humayun
- Production company: Jaaz Multimedia
- Distributed by: Jaaz Multimedia
- Release date: 10 May 2024
- Country: Bangladesh
- Language: Bengali

Potu is a 2024 Bengali language Bangladeshi crime thriller film directed by Ahmed Humayun and Suzein Salam. Ahmed Humayun is a distinguished musician and music producer within the Bangladeshi industry. Suzein Salam made history as the nation's youngest film director, debuting at the age of 21. For her pioneering work in producing the first feature film shot entirely in Rajshahi, she was honored with the Rajshahi Mayor's Recognition Award on 22nd of May 2024. It was produced and distributed by Jaaz Multimedia.This is the first film in the history of Bangladesh which has been produced independently outside Dhaka without any Dhaka shots. Evan Sair, Afra Shaiara and Shoaib Monir play the lead roles. Evan Sair and Afra Shaiara made their film debuts in this film. Potu was Premiered in Star Cineplex on May 10 2024 and launched in all the Star Cineplex theatres alongside 200 local and other cinema halls all over Bangladesh.

== Cast ==
- Evan Sair
- Afra Shaiar
- Shoaib Monir
- Dilruba Doyel - Jamila
- Ariful Rony
- Bacchu Dewan
- Galib Sardar
- Bulton Nil
- Akash Bin Osama
- Shahriar Fozdar
- Tarek Mahmud Joy
- Galib
- Keya
- Manik

== Music ==
The song was sung by Kolkata's Lagnajita Chakraborty, Bangladesh's Islam Palakar along with Humayun, who was also the music director.

== Production ==
The film was set and shot around Rajshahi, a northern city of Bangladesh. It received uncut clearance from the censor board on 3 April 2024.

== Release ==
The film was released in nearly 200 theaters on 10 May 2024.
