= Baba Yadav =

Indian film choreographer and director

- Rajesh Kumar Yadav
- Occupations: Choreographer and director
- Years active: 2000–present

Baba Yadav is an Indian film choreographer and director in Bengali cinema.

== Filmography ==
=== Director ===
Denotes films that have not yet been released

Year	Film	Cast	Notes
2013	Boss: Born to Rule	Jeet, Subhashree Ganguly	Remake of Telugu film Businessman
2014	Game: He Plays To Win	Jeet, Subhashree Ganguly	Remake of Tamil film Thuppakki
2016	Badsha: The Don	Jeet, Nusrat Faria, Shraddha Das	Indo-Bangladesh joint production; Remake of Telugu film Don Seenu
2017	Boss 2: Back to Rule	Jeet, Subhashree Ganguly, Nusrat Faria	Indo-Bangladeshi joint production
2018	Villain	Ankush Hazra, Mimi Chakraborty, Rittika Sen	Based on Telugu film Gentleman
2021	O Mon Re	Yash Dasgupta, Madhumita Sarkar	Music Video
2024	Sentimentaaal	Yash Dasgupta, Nusrat Jahan , Sayantoni Ghosh	
2025	Paakhi	Ankush Hazra, Subhashree Ganguly	

=== Choreographer ===
Denotes films that have not yet been released

Year	Film	Cast	Notes
2023	Priyotoma	Shakib Khan, Idhika Paul	Bengali
2021	O Mon Re (Music Video)	Yash Dasgupta, Madhumita Sarkar	Bengali
2021	Pehla Nasha (Music Video)	Raj Barman, Rashmi Poddar, DJ Harshit Shah	Hindi
2021	Miss Call	Soham Chakraborty, Rittika Sen	Bengali
2021	Magic	Ankush Hazra, Oindrila Sen	Bengali
2021	Tumi Ashbe Bole	Bonny Sengupta, Koushani Mukherjee	Bengali
2020	Elo Maa Dugga Thakur (Music Video)	Arya Dasgupta, Sreeja Dutta	Bengali
2019	Password	Dev. Rukmini Maitra, Parambrata Chatterjee, Paoli Dam, Adrit Roy	Bengali
2019	Shahenshah	Shakib Khan. Nusraat Faria, Rodela Jannat, Amit Hasan, Ahmed Sharif, DJ Sohel, Sadek Bacchu, Shiba Sanu, Misha Shawdagar	
2018	Villain	Ankush Hazra, Mimi Chakraborty, Rittika Sen	Bengali
2018	Hoichoi Unlimited	Dev, Kharaj Mukherjee, Saswata Chatterjee, Koushani Mukherjee, Puja Banerjee	Bengali
2018	Honeymoon	Soham Chakraborty, Subhashree Ganguly	Bengali
2018	Total Dadagiri	Yash Dasgupta, Mimi Chakraborty	Bengali
2017	Jio Pagla	Soham Chakraborty, Jisshu Sengupta, Hiran Chatterjee, Bonny Sengupta, Srabanti Chatterjee, Payel Sarkar, Rittika Sen, Koushani Mukherjee	Bengali
2017	Bolo Dugga Maiki	Ankush Hazra, Nusrat Jahan, Rajatava Dutta	Bengali
2017	Boss 2: Back To Rule	Jeet, Subhashree Ganguly, Nusraat Faria	Bengali
2017	Tomake Chai	Bonny Sengupta, Koushani Mukherjee	Bengali
2016	Haripada Bandwala	Ankush Hazra, Nusrat Jahan, Laboni Sarkar, Swastika Dutta	Bengali
2016	Abhimaan	Jeet, Subhashree Ganguly, Sayantika Banerjee	Bengali
2016	Rokto	Pori Moni, Ziaul Roshan	Bengali
2016	Badsha – The Don	Jeet, Nusraat Faria	Bengali
2016	Ki Kore Toke Bolbo	Ankush Hazra, Mimi Chakraborty	Bengali
2015	Shudhu Tomari Jonyo	Dev, Srabanti Chatterjee, Soham Chakraborty, Mimi Chakraborty	Bengali
2015	Besh Korechi Prem Korechi	Jeet, Koel Mallick	Bengali
2015	Jamai 420	Soham Chakraborty, Hiran Chatterjee, Ankush Hazra, Payel Sarkar, Mimi Chakraborty, Nusrat Jahan	Bengali
2014	Borbaad	Bonny Sengupta, Rittika Sen	Bengali
2013	Kanamachi	Ankush Hazra, Abir Chatterjee, Srabanti Chatterjee, Sayani Ghosh	Bengali
2012	Bojhena Shey Bojhena	Soham Chakraborty, Mimi Chakraborty, Abir Chatterjee, Payel Sarkar	Bengali
2012	Le Halua Le	Mithun Chakraborty, Soham Chakraborty, Hiran Chatterjee, Payel Sarkar	Bengali
2011	Lanka		Bengali
2011	Paglu	Dev, Koel Mallick	Bengali
2010	Shedin Dekha Hoyechilo	Dev, Srabanti Chatterjee	Bengali
2010	Kellafate	Ankush Hazra, Rupashree	Bengali
2010	Dui Prithibi	Jeet, Dev, Koel Mallick, Barkha Sengupta	Bengali
2010	Josh	Jeet, Srabanti Chatterjee	Bengali
2008	Premer Kahini	Dev, Koel Mallick	Bengali
2007	I Love You	Dev, Payel Sarkar	Bengali
2005	Dus	Sanjay Dutt, Sunil Shetty, Abhishek Bachchan, Zayed Khan, Shilpa Shetty, Diya Mirza, Esha Deol, Raima Sen	Hindi
2005	Chehraa	Bipasha Basu, Dino Morea, Preeti Jhangiani, Irrfan Khan, Ayub Khan	Hindi
2005	Yehi Hai Zindagi	Parvin Dabas, Sahil Khan, Sheetal Kshirsagar, Gracy Singh	Hindi
2004	Muskaan	Aftab Shivdasani, Gracy Singh	Hindi
2003	Zameen	Ajay Devgn, Abhishek Bachchan, Bipasha Basu	Hindi
2003	Qayamat: City Under Threat	Ajay Devgn, Sunil Shetty, Sanjay Kapoor, Arbaaz Khan, Isha Koppikar, Riya Sen, Neha Dhupia	Hindi
2003	Calcutta Mail	Anil Kapoor, Rani Mukerji, Manisha Koirala	Hindi
2003	Andaaz	Akshay Kumar, Lara Dutta, Priyanka Chopra	Hindi
2002	Devdas	Shah Rukh Khan, Madhuri Dixit, Aishwarya Rai, Jackie Shroff, Kirron Kher	Hindi
2001	Lagaan	Aamir Khan, Gracy Singh	Hindi
2000	Dhaai Akshar Prem Ke	Abhishek Bachchan, Aishwarya Rai	Hindi
2000	Fiza	Hrithik Roshan, Karishma Kapoor, Bikram Saluja, Neha	Hindi
1997	Mohabbat	Sanjay Kapoor, Akshaye Khanna, Madhuri Dixit	Hindi
