= Falguni Rahman Jolly =

Bangladeshi film actress and model

- ফাল্গুনি রহমান জলি
- Born: 24 August 1996 (age 29); Savar, Dhaka, Bangladesh
- Occupation: Film actress
- Years active: 2016–present
- Spouse: Arafat Rahman (m. 2019)
- Children: 1 (daughter)

Falguni Rahman Jolly (born 24 August 1996) is a Bangladeshi film actress. As a child, Rahman studied singing and dancing at Bangladesh Shishu Academy. She started her career with 2016's Jaaz Multimedia production Angaar. Subsequently, she worked on Niyoti opposite Arifin Shuvoo, and in 2017 co-starred with Shahriaz in Meyeti Ekhon Kothay Jabe.

== Personal life ==
She married businessman Arafat Rahman in 2019. They had a daughter in 2020.

== Filmography ==
Year	Film	Role	Notes	Ref.
2016	Angaar	Maya	Debut film; Indo-Bangladesh joint production	
2016	Niyoti	Mila	Indo-Bangladesh joint production	
2017	Meyeti Ekhon Kothay Jabe	Krishnokoli		
2024	Danger Zone			
2025	Goar			
TBA	Officer Returns †	TBA	Filming	
