= Dhat Teri Ki =

- Bengali: ধ্যাততেরিকি
- Directed by: Shamim Ahamed Roni
- Written by: Abdullah Zahir Babu
- Produced by: Abdul Aziz
- Starring: Arifin Shuvoo; Nusrat Faria Mazhar; Ziaul Roshan; Farin Khan
- Edited by: Touhid Hossain Chowdhury
- Music by: Emon Saha; Shawkat Ali Emon; Dabbu; Imran Mahmudul; Joy Khan
- Production company: Jaaz Multimedia
- Distributed by: Jaaz Multimedia (Bangladesh) SVF Entertainment (India)
- Release dates: 14 April 2017 (Bangladesh); November 2017 (India)
- Country: Bangladesh
- Language: Bengali

Dhat Teri Ki is a Bangladeshi romance comedy film directed by Shamim Ahamed Roni and produced by Abdul Aziz under the banner of Jaaz Multimedia. the film features Arifin Shuvoo, Nusrat Faria, Ziaul Roshan and Farin Khan in the lead roles. Farin Khan made her debut with this film. The movie is a remake of 2012 Punjabi movie Carry On Jatta.

== Cast ==
- Arifin Shuvo as Raj
- Nusrat Faria as Shanti
- Ziaul Roshan as Salman
- Farin Khan as Madhuri
- Biswanath Basu as Raj's uncle
- Sushoma Sarkar as Raj's aunt
- Subrata as Madhuri's father
- Rajatava Dutta as Raj's father
- Sadek Bachchu as Salman's father
- Subhasish Mukherjee as Tera Saddam
- Supriyo Dutta as Shanti's brother
- Tasnia Rahman Amoeba

== Production ==
The film was produced by Jaaz Multimedia, who also distributed the film. Filming of the movie took place in February 2017, in places including Bangkok.

== Release ==
Dhat Teri Ki was released nationwide in Bangladesh alongside the holiday Bengali New Year on 14 April 2017. In November 2017, it was announced by Jaaz Multimedia that with an exchange of films with SVF Entertainment, Dhat Teri Ki would be released in India.

== Soundtrack ==
The soundtrack of Dhat Teri Ki features music composed by Emon Saha, Shawkat Ali Emon, Dabbu and Imran Mahmudul. The soundtrack also features the vocals of Kona and Satrujit Dasgupta.

No.	Title	Lyrics	Music	Singer(s)	Length
1.	"Mor Ghumo Ghore"	Kazi Nazrul Islam	Emon Saha,	Nodi	4:19
2.	"Rongila Rongila"	Kabir Bakul	Shawkat Ali Emon,	Imran Mahmudul & Kona	3:21
3.	"Dhat Teri Ki" (Title Song)	Raja Chanda	Dabbu	Satrujit Dasgupta & Antara Mitra	3:22
4.	"Jane Ei Mon Jane"	Robiul Islam Jibon	Imran Mahmudul	Imran Mahmudul	4:11
