= Meyeti Ekhon Kothay Jabe =

Bangladeshi drama film

- Film poster
- Bengali: মেয়েটি এখন কোথায় যাবে
- Directed by: Nader Chowdhury
- Written by: Imdadul Hoque Milon
- Screenplay by: Nader Chowdhury; Abdullah Zahir Babu
- Starring: Fazlur Rahman Babu
- Music by: Emon Saha
- Production company: Jaaz Multimedia
- Release date: 3 October 2017
- Country: Bangladesh
- Language: Bengali

Meyeti Ekhon Kothay Jabe is a 2017 Bangladeshi drama film directed by Nader Chowdhury, written by Imdadul Hoque Milon. The film received the Bangladesh National Film Awards in 2016 in 4 categories.

== Cast ==
- Shah Riaz as Raaj
- Falguni Rahman Jolly as Krishnokoli
- Fazlur Rahman Babu
- Raisul Islam Asad
- Mamunur Rashid

== Soundtrack ==
- "Moner Moddhe Pakhna Meila" - Dolly Sayontoni
- "Ami Jochhona Dekhi Purnimate" - Sabina Yasmin, N/A

== Awards ==
- Bangladesh National Film Awards 2016
  - Best Actor in Supporting Role – Fazlur Rahman Babu
  - Best Music Director – Emon Saha
  - Best Music Composer – Emon Saha
  - Best Lyricist – Gazi Mazharul Anwar
