= Boss: Born to Rule =

- Theatrical release poster
- Directed by: Baba Yadav
- Screenplay by: N. K. Salil
- Story by: Puri Jagannadh
- Produced by: Reliance Entertainment; Grassroot Entertainment
- Starring: Jeet; Subhashree Ganguly; Chiranjeet Chakraborty; Rajatava Dutta; Biswanath Basu; Biswajit Chakraborty
- Cinematography: P. Selva Kumar
- Edited by: MD. Kalam
- Music by: Songs: Jeet Gannguli; Background score: Jeet Gannguli; S. P. Venkatesh
- Production companies: Reliance Entertainment; Grassroot Entertainment; Jalsha Movies Production
- Distributed by: Reliance Entertainment; Grassroot Entertainment
- Release date: 9 August 2013
- Running time: 140 minutes
- Country: India
- Language: Bengali

Boss: Born to Rule is a 2013 Indian Bengali-language epic gangster action-thriller film directed by Baba Yadav in his directorial debut. Produced by Reliance Entertainment in association with Jeet under the banner of Grassroot Entertainment and distributed by Jalsha Movies Production, it stars Jeet in the titular role, alongside Subhashree Ganguly, Chiranjeet Chakraborty, Rajatava Dutta, Supriyo Dutta and Biswanath Basu in lead roles.

Made on a budget of ₹67.5 million (US$810,000), the film was predominantly shot in Kolkata, Mumbai and Goa; with some foreign locations including Bangkok, Italy and Turkey. The soundtrack of the film is composed by Jeet Gannguli, with lyrics penned by Chandrani Gannguli, Prosen and Meghnad, while S. P. Venkatesh provides its score. The film had cinematography handled by P. Selva Kumar, editing by MD Kalam, action sequences designed by Rocky Rajesh and dance choreographed by Yadav himself.

== Plot ==
At a time when Mumbai Police headed by Police Commissioner Binayak Roy announce that the much dreaded Mafia Raj is completely wiped out in the city and there are no more crime lords in Mumbai, a rookie named Surya lands in the country's commercial capital with an intention to become a Mafia Don. His friend Shibu receives him and brings him to Dharavi. He offers him shelter and tells him that he would soon fetch him a job so that he can settle down in life. But Surya wants to carve an identity for himself, by reorganizing Mumbai's Mafia Raj and eventually rule Mumbai. He then mocks as a cop and gets his first bounty, and then he forms a gang of his own. Surya meets up with a MLA Gopinath Shivalkar alias "Gopi Sahib", who is in trouble and offers him help. Surya begins recruiting criminals and gangsters in Mumbai and starts to extort people for money. Surya further helps the Dharavi locals to clear their debts by making his henchmen rob the original copies of the loan documents in the local branch of Bank of Maharashtra and destroy the bank records. While the locals hail him as their saviour, Surya slowly gains momentum and gets feared for extortion.

Meanwhile, Surya also knowingly tries to get romantically involved with a model named Rusha, Police Commissioner Binayak's daughter, in order to safeguard himself from Binayak. In the process, he actually falls for the girl and tries for her acceptance. One day, Surya learns that Central Minister Rajshekhar Sinha, who aspires to be the next PM, has sent some assassins to kill him. Surya tricks the men into believing that he is a guide sent to help them where he plants bombs in their food that explodes, resulting in a shootout. While escaping, Surya sees Rusha, who has now learned of his true nature. When arrested, Surya accepts that he trapped her, but now he truly loves her. In the meantime, Surya gets surrounded by police and Binayak arrests him. However, Binayak is forced to free Surya after his henchmen kidnap Rusha. Surya promises to give up crime in order to live with Rusha, but he decides to set up a business which is untouchable by the police, after his proposal is turned down.

In the course of the film, Surya's friendship with Gopi gets stronger, and so does his political connections. Surya sets up a company named Surya Exports & Imports, as a front for his vigilante acts. Surya reveals his plan to grow his network of organized crime all over India. In order to set up branch offices all over the country, Surya recruits local gangsters for staff and begins to forcibly extract a 2% tax on every contract made in the respective areas. Eventually, he becomes a billionaire, and during the inauguration of his Business Bank, reveals his thirst for power, but not money, to Binayak, further citing the decline in crime rate significantly after recruiting the gangsters, and expressing his desire to help the needy. He also claims that he believes in war but not morality stating that he wants to rid India of crime.

Eventually, Surya also helps Gopi to become the Mayor of Mumbai by defeating Arun Gokhle, who is backed up by Rajshekhar. Foremostly, Arun Ghokle goes against Rajshekhar and talks to the police about Rajshekhar's illegal activities and scams. Thereafter he gets endorsed and later killed by Rajshekhar, under the police custody. Learning that Rajshekhar is planning to get both Binayak and Rusha killed, Surya rushes to their house but fails to save Binayak, who tells him to kill Rajshekhar in his final moments. Surya then reveals to Rusha that he was an American-born Indian whose philanthropist parents were cheated and killed by Rajshekhar. As a child, Surya tried to enlist the help of the police but finding none, and he ended up stabbing and shooting Jaidev publicly. The violent murder of his parents, who were the victims of political corruption, haunted him and the attitude of people towards an orphan while growing up made him hate the society.

In his pursuit of power and achieving his goal of getting India rid of the crime, he shifts his attention towards the upcoming Indian parliament elections. Surya meets Ravikanth Sahay, the head of the opposition party through Gopi, and offers him 350 billion (US$5.5 billion) for election campaigning along with the promise to make him the next PM of India. Surya spends crores of rupees per constituency in the nation and also reveals Rajshekhar's illegal affairs, making him unable to contest in the elections.

A disoriented Rajshekhar kidnaps Rusha and Surya arrives to rescue her. In anger towards Surya, Rajshekhar reveals that he has been disqualified from the election in spite of having a lot of power and gaining public sympathy, due to Surya's tactics. However, Surya gets into a fight with Jaidev's henchmen and leaves them all dead, except one who holds Rusha at knifepoint. Rajshekhar agrees to free Rusha instead of Surya's death. Surya shoots himself before shooting both Rajshekhar and the henchman to death. Rusha accepts her love for Surya, and Binayak, who has come round, agrees with them. Besides, Surya also succeeds installing both Gopi as the CM of Mumbai and Ravikant as the PM of India.

While recovering in the hospital, Surya delivers a message to the public, citing that there is no importance of a life that have no target; and also forbidding to leave a single place of one to anyone. The film ends with Surya's motivational dialogue, "Be the King of your own Kingdom."

== Cast ==
- Jeet as Surya, An American-born based indian philanthropist turned most wanted dreadful underworld gangster and kingpin.
- Subhashree Ganguly as Rusha Roy
- Chiranjeet as Police Commissioner Vinayak Roy, who wants to remove the underworld syndicate from Mumbai
- Rajatava Dutta as Rajsekhar Sinha, who tends to be the Prime Minister of India
- Supriyo Dutta as Chief Minister Gopinath Shivalkar
- Biswajit Chakraborty as Mumbai Mayor Arun Gokhle
- Biswanath Basu as Shibcharan Chowdhury
- Sanju Mandal as Kaalia
- Joy Badlani as Shailendra Singh
- Bhashkar Dev as Inspector Bharath Patnaik
- Somnath Kar as Shakib
- Yusuf Chishti as the rich spoilt kid
- Debomoy Mukherjee as Keshav
- Pradip Dhar as Tukaram Apte
- Arindol Bagchi as Local Inspector

== Soundtrack ==
Boss: Born to Rule

Soundtrack album by Jeet Gannguli
- Released: 13 July 2013
- Recorded: 2013
- Genre: Feature film soundtrack
- Language: Bengali
- Label: T-Series
- Producers: Mahesh Ramanathan, Jeet

Jeet Gannguli chronology
Rocky (2013)	Boss: Born to Rule (2013)	Rangbaaz (2013)

Singles from Boss: Born to Rule
- 1. "Boss (Title Track)" Released: 15 Jun 2013; 2. "Mon Majhi Re" Released: 27 Jun 2013; 3. "Jhinkunakur Na" Released: 11 Jul 2013; 4. "Eeche Joto" Released: 19 Jul 2013

Arijit Singh won Best Playback Singer (Male) at the Filmfare Awards East for the song "Mon Majhi Re", which had an overwhelming response from all over Bengal. The soundtrack was released on 13 July 2013. The song "Mon Majhi Re" was later remade in Hindi for the film Singham Returns by Gannguli as "Sun Le Zara", also sung by Singh.

The music of the film has been composed by Jeet Gannguli. The lyrics have been penned by Meghnad, Prasen and Chandrani Gannguli.

Track listing
No.	Title	Lyrics	Artist(s)	Length
1.	"Boss (Title Track)"	Meghnad	Jeet Gannguli	3:33
2.	"Jhinkunakur Na"	Meghnad	Rana Mazumdar and Akriti Kakar	3:40
3.	"Mon Majhi Re"	Prasen (Prasenjit Mukherjee)	Arijit Singh	5:09
4.	"Eeche Joto"	Chandrani Gannguli	Arijit Singh, Monali Thakur	3:43
5.	"Boss Mashup"			3:50
Total length:				19:55

== Reception ==
=== Critical response ===
The film received mixed-to-positive reviews from critics. Jaya Biswas of The Times of India reviewed "Jeet looks slim and fit. He can dance, fight and emote as well. His performance — as a shrewd and confident guy, who couldn't care less about scruples in life — is worthy of mention. Though Subhashree adds to the glamour quotient, she disappoints in the acting department. She looks fabulous in smart off-shoulder tops but her chemistry with Jeet is non-existent. Our hero's one-liner seems quite pertinent here: "Raja thakle tar rani ke toh thakte i hobe". Veteran actor Chiranjeet is effective as the police commissioner. Rajatava, Supriyo and Biswajit do their bit as crooked politicians — nothing we haven't seen before. But a dull storyline and a weak script ruin the show. Too many characters create confusion. The songs fail to impress and the lyrics are not up to the mark. But cut out the nitpicking and nothing should stop Jeet fans from joining their favourite star in action."

== Box office ==
Boss: Born to Rule was Jeet's first film to get an all-India release. Boss garnered ₹72.6 lakh (equivalent to ₹1.3 crore or US$140,000 in 2026) on the opening day. It collected ₹1.86 lakh (equivalent to ₹3.4 lakh or US$3,700 in 2026) in its first weekend. The film grossed ₹6.75 crore (equivalent to ₹13 crore or US$1.3 million in 2026).

== Awards and nominations ==
Ceremony	Category	Nominee	Result
Kalakar Awards	Best Debut Director	Baba Yadav	Won
Kalakar Awards	Best Movie Award	Boss	Won
Kalakar Awards	Most Promising Actress	Subhashree Ganguly	Won
Kalakar Awards	Best Music Director	Jeet Gannguli	Won
Filmfare Awards East	Filmfare Award for Best Actor (male)	Jeet	Nominated
Filmfare Awards East	Best Music Director	Jeet Gannguli	Won
Filmfare Awards East	Best Male Playback	Arijit Singh for the song "Mon Majhi Re"	Won
Filmfare Awards East	Best Choreography	Baba Yadav	Won
Mirchi Music Awards Bangla	Male Vocalist of the Year	Arijit Singh for the song "Mon Majhi Re"	Won
Mirchi Music Awards Bangla	Music Director of the Year	Jeet Gannguli for the song "Mon Majhi Re"	Won
Mirchi Music Awards Bangla	Album of the Year	Boss	Won

== Sequel ==
Following up on the success of Boss, it was announced in September 2013, that the team of Jeet and Baba Yadav have decided to create a "Part II" sequel film with plans for distribution abroad. The sequel is titled Boss 2: Back To Rule and retains many of the same cast and crew of the original film. Unlike the first film, which was a remake of Businessman, Boss 2 is an original film. The sequel is also an Indo-Bangladesh joint venture, being co-produced by Bangladesh's Jaaz Multimedia. The shooting of the film was started from January 2017, and the film was released on 23 June in Bangladesh and in July in India.
