= Maska (2009 film) =

- Theatrical release poster
- Directed by: B. Gopal
- Written by: Paruchuri Brothers (dialogues)
- Screenplay by: M. S. Raju
- Story by: Krishna
- Produced by: M. S. Raju
- Starring: Ram Pothineni; Hansika Motwani; Sheela Kaur; Sunil
- Cinematography: Sekhar V. Joseph
- Edited by: Kotagiri Venkateshwara Rao
- Music by: Chakri
- Production company: Sumanth Art Productions
- Release date: 14 January 2009
- Running time: 156 minutes
- Country: India
- Language: Telugu
- Budget: ₹12 crore (equivalent to ₹33 crore or US$3.5 million in 2023)

Maska (transl. Buttering) (Note: Maska means to praise people in expectation for some benefit in return.) is a 2009 Indian Telugu-language romantic action comedy film. It was directed by B. Gopal and starred Ram Pothineni, Hansika Motwani, Sheela, and Sunil.

Clashing against Arundhati, Maska released on 14 January 2009 with 300 prints in 550 theaters to generally mixed to positive reviews from critics and emerged as an average grosser, collecting a distributors' share of ₹10 crore. It has since been remade in Bengali (Bangladesh) as Onnorokom Bhalobasha in 2012 and as Hero 420 (Indo-Bangladesh joint production) in 2016.

== Plot ==
Krish (Ram) is a happy-go-lucky guy who lives with his brother (Naresh) and sister-in-law (Jhansi). He was in love with a girl named Manju (Sheela), who happens to be the daughter of Simhachalam (Mukesh Rishi). Krish's only intention is to become rich by marrying her, and he does not have any feelings whatsoever towards her. He weaves a love story between him and a girl called Meenakshi, aka Meenu (Hansika Motwani), to make Manju fall for him. He also meets Meenu, starts to like her for real, and falls in love with her. Meanwhile, Simhachalam and Shinde (Pradeep Rawat) run against each other in a presidential election in Delhi. Shinde is a man of misdeeds and tries to find faults in Simhachalam's personal life so that he can expose him in front of the high command of the party so that his route will be clear to get the party ticket. Shinde comes to learn that Simhachalam has another wife (Seetha) and a daughter who lives in Hyderabad. He sends his men to find them. Unfortunately, Simhachalam fixes Manju and Krish's marriage, but Krish loves Meenu. Manju discovers it and points a gun on Meenu, but she leaves Krish to her and reveals that Meenu is the illegitimate daughter of Simhachalam and the sister of Manju. Simhachalam, Krish, and Shinde arrive. Meenu and Manju emotionally ask their father to forget everything and live happily. He gives up the election to Shinde. Krish then marries Meenu, and Manju lives happily.

== Cast ==
- Ram Pothineni as Krishna (Krish)
- Hansika Motwani as Meenakshi (Meenu)
- Sheela as Manju
- Brahmanandam as Doctor
- Sunil as Bhadra, Krish's friend
- Prakash Raj as Prakash, Krish's father
- Sumithra as Amrutham, Krish's mother
- Prabha as Parvathi, Meenakshi's mother
- Sarath Babu as Panduranga Rao, Meenakshi's father
- Mukesh Rishi as Simhachalam, Meenu and Manju's father
- Seetha as Saroja, Meenu and Manju's mother
- Pradeep Rawat as Shinde
- Naresh as Naresh, Krish's brother
- Jhansi as Lakshmi, Krish's sister-in-law
- Paruchuri Venkateswara Rao as Venkatachalam, Simhachalam's assistant
- Chandra Mohan as Chandram, Jailor
- Dharmavarapu Subramanyam as Software Company M.D.
- Telangana Shakuntala as Shakuntala, Shinde's sister
- Krishna Bhagavaan as Akuvakkala Ananda Rao
- M. S. Narayana as Priest Narayana
- Venu Madhav Venu, Bhadra's friend

== Music ==
Maska

Soundtrack album by Chakri
- Released: 25 December 2008
- Recorded: 2008
- Genre: Feature film soundtrack
- Length: 28:03
- Language: Telugu
- Label: Aditya Music
- Producer: Chakri

Chakri chronology
Neninthe (2008)	Maska (2008)	Raju Maharaju (2008)

The music of Maska was launched at a function organised in a song set erected at Rama Naidu Studios on the night of 25 December 2008. Dasari launched the audio CD and gave the first unit to D Rama Naidu. D. Suresh Babu launched the audiocassette and gave the first unit to the main leads of the film. "Gunde Godarila" was the first song that was composed for the film, and "Aa Vaipunna Ee Vaipunna" was the second.

All lyrics are written by Kandikonda; all music is composed by Chakri.

Track Listing
No.	Title	Singer(s)	Length
1.	"Hare Hare Rama"	Suraj Jagan	4:25
2.	"Gunde Godarila"	Zubeen Garg, Kousalya	5:11
3.	"Kalloki Dilloki"	Chakri	4:17
4.	"Kalaganna Kalaganna"	Chakri, Kousalya	5:31
5.	"Aa Vaipunna Ee Vaipunna"	Sadhana Sargam, Hariharan	4:12
6.	"Bhagdad Gajadongai Vasta"	Ravi Varma, Sunidhi Chauhan	4:27
Total length:			28:03

== Reception ==
Jeevi of Idlebrain.com rated the film three out of five stars and wrote, "The plus points of the film are Ram and first half. On the flip side, there is a bit of lag in the last half an hour of the film and more clarity is needed in love triangle. On a whole, Maska has got entertainment elements that might work at box office." Radhika Rajamani of Rediff.com gave the film two out of five stars and wrote, "The saving grace of the film seems to be Ram. He is cool, casual and effortless. He is brilliant in the dances and equally effective in action too. However, his spirited performance cannot salvage a film whose script has nothing much new to offer."
