= Hero 420 =

- Theatrical release poster
- Directed by: Saikat Nasir; Sujit Mondal
- Screenplay by: Pele; Abdullah Zahir Babu
- Produced by: Ashok Dhanuka; Abdul Aziz (co-producer)
- Starring: Om; Nusraat Faria; Riya Sen; Ashish Vidyarthi
- Music by: Savvy
- Production companies: Jaaz Multimedia; Eskay Movies
- Distributed by: Jaaz Multimedia; Eskay Movies
- Release dates: 12 February 2016 (India); 19 February 2016 (Bangladesh)
- Countries: India; Bangladesh
- Language: Bengali

Hero 420 is an Indo-Bangladesh joint production romantic action film directed by Sujit Mondal and Saikat Nasir and produced by Abdul Aziz and Ashok Dhanuka under the banners of Jaaz Multimedia and Eskay Movies. The soundtrack of the film is composed by Savvy Gupta. The film stars Om, Nusraat Faria Mazhar, and Riya Sen in the lead roles. The film was released on 19 February 2016 while the motion poster was released on 27 December 2015. It is the remake of 2009 Telugu movie Maska.

== Cast ==
- Om as Krish
- Nusrat Faria as Rai
- Riya Sen as Riya
- Ashish Vidyarthi as Rai / Riya's father
- Pradeep Rawat as Anukul Roy
- Ahmed Sharif
- Tulika Basu
- Moumita Chakraborty
- Shimul Khan

== Production ==
In September 2015, Jaaz Multimedia announced the project with Nusraat Faria Mazhar as the main female lead. Later, Om was hired to play the lead male role, while Riya Sen will be seen playing a pivotal role in the film.

== Filming ==
The first phase of the shooting began in Hyderabad, followed by Bangkok, where a song was shot. The last phase of the film was filmed in Bangladesh. Movie's vital part shoot in Hyderabad and Bangladesh. Movie ready for coming in theaters.

== Soundtrack ==
All lyrics are written by Riddhi Barua, Prasen, Anyaman; all music is composed by Savvy.

| No. | Title | Lyrics | Music | Singer(s) | Length |
|---|---|---|---|---|---|
| 1. | "O Riya" | Riddhi Barua | Savvy | Shadaab Hashmi | 2:59 |
| 2. | "Ore Piya" | Prasen | Savvy | Mohammed Irfan | 4:25 |
| 3. | "Ae Poth" | Prasen | Savvy | Shadaab Hashmi | 4:21 |
| 4. | "3G" | Riddhi Barua | Savvy | Nakash Aziz, Kalpana Patowary | 3:51 |
| 5. | "Chaichi Toke" | Anyaman | Savvy | Ash King | 3:57 |
