= Nusraat Faria =

Bangladeshi film actress

- নুসরাত ফারিয়া
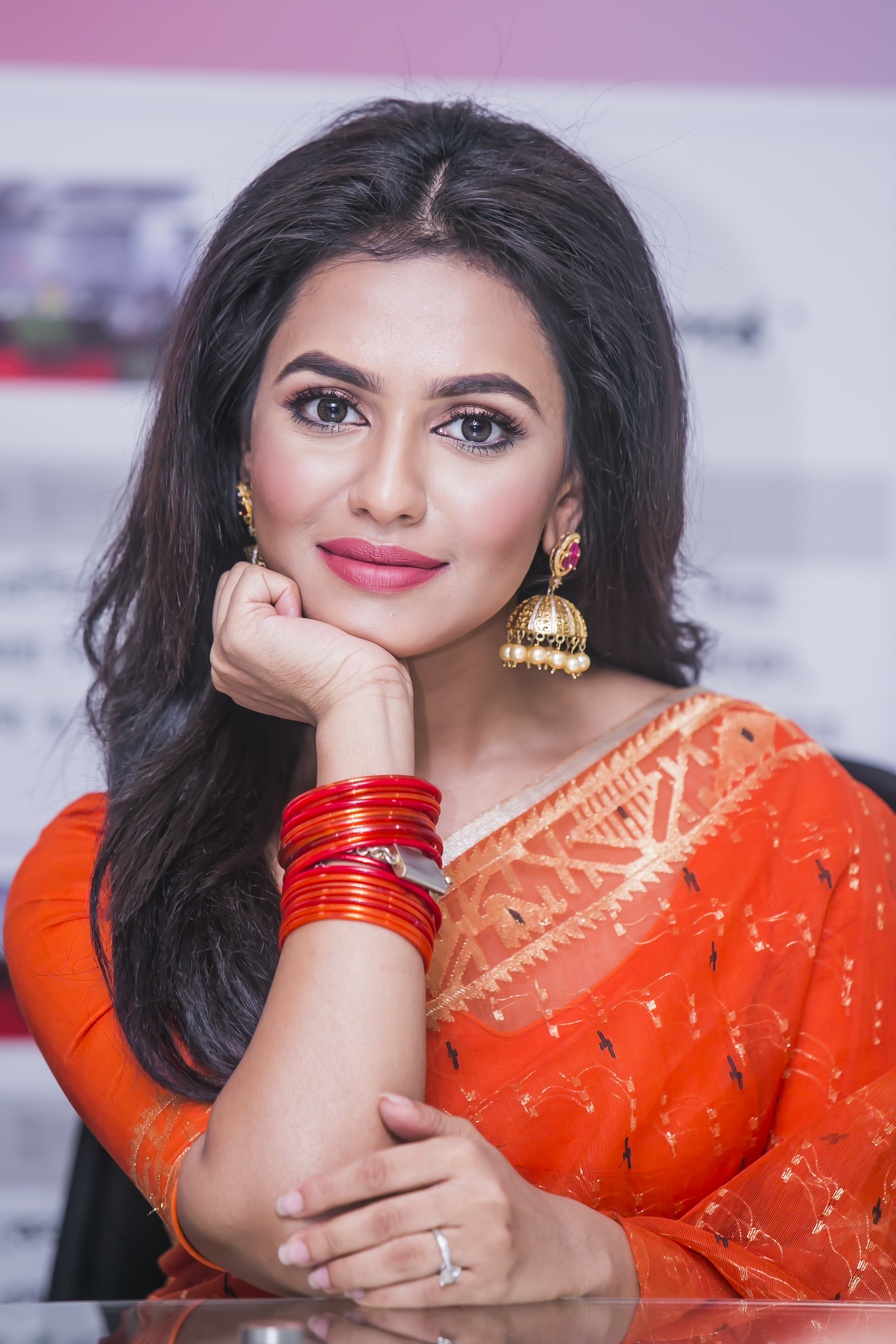
- Faria in 2017
- Born: Faria Shetu; 8 September 1995 (age 31); Dhaka, Bangladesh
- Education: Bachelor of Laws (LLB) from University of London
- Occupations: Actress; television presenter; radio jockey; singer
- Years active: 2010–present
- Awards: See below
- Musical career
- Genre: Pop
- Labels: SVF Music; CMV

Nusraat Faria Mazhar (born 8 September 1995) (Note: multiple sources:) popularly and professionally known as Nusraat Faria, is a Bangladeshi actress, model, singer, television presenter and a former radio jockey, who mostly works in Dhallywood and Tollywood films. (Note: multiple sources:)

She made her acting debut in Dhallywood with the film Aashiqui (2015), She played the lead role opposite Ankush Hazra, and the film was a commercial success. Following the success of her debut film, Nusraat appeared in several other popular movies such as Hero 420 (2016), Badsha – The Don (2016), Premi O Premi (2017) and Boss 2: Back to Rule (2017). She played the role of Sheikh Hasina in the Bangabandhu biopic, Mujib: The Making of a Nation.

== Career ==
Faria started her career as a debater participating in a BTV debate show. She is a national debate champion from 2010 and 2011. She started her career in show business as a model in several television commercials. Throughout her career, she has worked in various television commercials and radio programs. Nusraat Faria made her first TV appearance on the show Thik Bolchen Toh on RTV. In 2012, Faria caught everyone's attention on NTV's Thirty-First Dhamaka Cox's Bazar program. In January 2013, she received acclaim for hosting Bollywood playback singer Sunidhi Chauhan's show titled Sunidhi Live Concert. In 2014, she hosted a reality show, Fair and Handsome: The Ultimate Man. Some of the popular programs she has presented are- RTV's Late Night Coffee, SA TV's Clear SA Live Studio, ATN Bangla's Trend, GTV's Lux World of Glamour and NTV's Style and Trend, Radio Foorti's Night Shift with Nusrat Faria, etc.

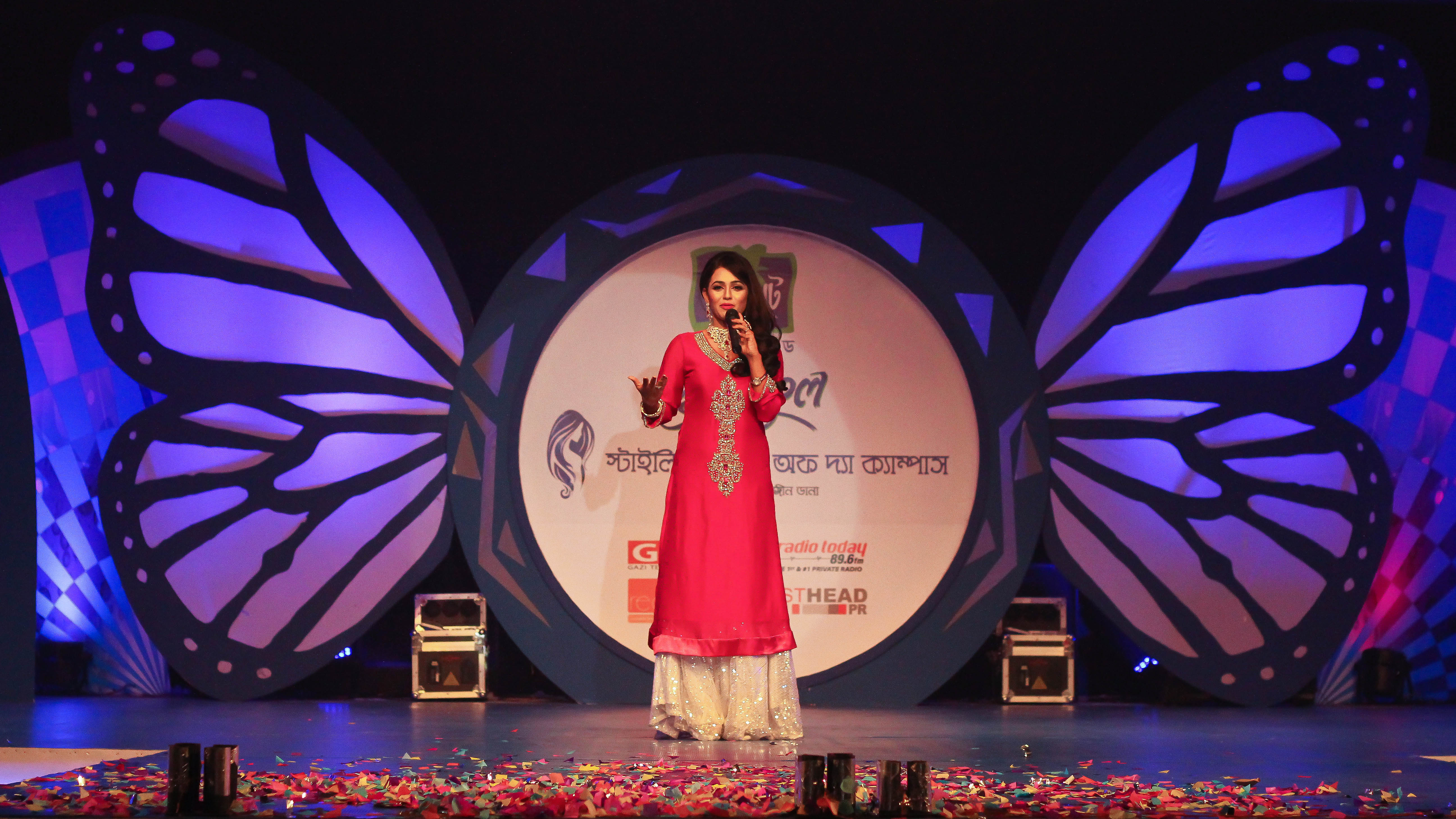
Faria hosting the grand finale of Parachute Advanced Beliphool Stylish Hair of the Campus 2014, at the Radisson Blu, Dhaka

=== Film ===
She signed with Jaaz Multimedia to appear in two films, titled Aashiqui and Hero 420. The former, being her debut film, released in late 2015 while the latter released in early 2016. The former also earned Faria a Meril Prothom Alo Award for Best Newcomer in film or television. Both films were Indo-Bangladeshi joint ventures, being co-produced by Eskay Movies.

In 2016, Faria also starred in another Indo-Bangladeshi co-production, Badsha - The Don, directed by Baba Yadav. The film also starred popular Indian actor Jeet, and is considered a turning point in Faria's career, earning Faria a Tele Cine Award for Best Actress from Bangladesh.

After starring in only Indo-Bangladeshi films for the past two years, Faria then starred in two Bangladeshi films in 2017, Premi O Premi and Dhat Teri Ki. Faria also recorded dialogue for Detective, Bangladesh's first animated film which remain unreleased. All three of these films were produced by Jaaz Multimedia and also starred Arifin Shuvoo.

In 2017, Faria returned with the team behind Badsha - The Don for the film Boss 2: Back to Rule, again directed by Baba Yadav, produced by Jaaz Multimedia and starring Jeet. The film is a sequel to the 2013 film Boss: Born to Rule and also stars Subhashree Ganguly. The film is also an Indo-Bangladeshi joint venture, being co-produced by Walzen Media Works and Jeet's production company, Jeetz Filmworks. Initially rejecting the film, Faria later agreed to star in the film when she read the script, describing her character as layered and an opportunity to show off her acting prowess, also calling the character a trendsetter. In 2020, she teamed up with Shamim Ahamed Roni in action masala Shahenshah, co-starring Shakib Khan for the first time. She was nominated for the best actress in the CJFB Performance Award. Faria also came under criticism for her costume in the music video for the song "Allah Meherban" from Boss 2, a song which was also criticized for its lyrics. She performed for a music video, 'Pataka', written by Rakib Rahul and composed by Pritom Hasan. In 2022, Faria's another film Operation Sundarbans released where she played a tiger researcher.

She played the role of Sheikh Hasina in the film Mujib: The Making of a Nation In 2023. She was last seen in a film Jinn 3 in 2025.

== Personal life ==
Faria was born in Dhaka on September 8, 1995. Her birth name is Nusraat Faria Mazhar. Her nickname is Shetu. Her grandfather was an army officer, so she spent her childhood in the Dhaka Cantonment. She got engaged to Roni Riyad Rashid in 2020 but later broke up in 2023. She graduated with a bachelor's degree in law from the University of London in 2021.

=== Arrest ===
Nusraat Faria was arrested at Hazrat Shahjalal International Airport in Dhaka on May 18, 2025. There was an attempt to murder case filed against her at Bhatara Police Station. This case relates to an incident that occurred during the mass movement in July 2024. The case alleges that she and 16 other celebrities provided huge funds to suppress the anti-discrimination student movement.

Her arrest sparked widespread criticism. She has been arrested to 'punish' her for playing the role of Sheikh Hasina in the government-made film Mujib: The Making of a Nation, which was made about Sheikh Mujibur Rahman during the Awami League era, following allegations.

On 19 May 2025, a Dhaka court rejected her bail application and ordered her to be sent to prison. The next day, on 20 May, the court granted her bail.

== Filmography ==
=== Film ===
Key
| † | Denotes films that have not yet been released |

- All films are Bangladeshi Bengali-language, unless otherwise noted.

| Year | Film | Role | Notes | Ref. |
|---|---|---|---|---|
| 2015 | Aashiqui | Shruti | Debut film; Indo-Bangladesh joint production | |
| 2016 | Hero 420 | Rai | Indo-Bangladesh joint production | |
| 2016 | Badsha: The Don | Shreya | Indo-Bangladesh joint production | |
| 2017 | Premi O Premi | Maria | | |
| 2017 | Dhat Teri Ki | Shanti | | |
| 2017 | Boss 2: Back to Rule | Ayesha | Indo-Bangladesh joint production | |
| 2018 | Inspector Notty K | Samira | Indo-Bangladesh joint production | |
| 2019 | Bibaho Obhijaan | Rai | Indian Bengali film | |
| 2020 | Shahenshah | Laila | | |
| 2021 | Jodi Kintu Tobou | Preeti | Released on ZEE5 | |
| 2022 | Operation Sundarban | Tania Kabir | | |
| 2023 | Bhoy | Brinda | Released on ZEE5; Indian Bengali film | |
| 2023 | Abar Bibaho Obhijaan | Rai | Indian Bengali film | |
| 2023 | Surongo | Herself | Cameo appearance in the song "O Taka Tui Amar Kolija Ar Jaan" | |
| 2023 | Patalghar | Babli | Released on Chorki | |
| 2023 | Mujib: The Making of a Nation | Sheikh Hasina | | |
| 2025 | Jinn 3 | Faria | | |
| 2026 | Lapata † | TBA | Filming | |
| 2026 | Lojja † | TBA | Filming | |
| 2026 | Thikana Bangladesh † | TBA | Post-production | |
| TBA | | | | |
| TBA | Detective † | Shoilbala(voice) | Animated film; Unreleased | |

=== Television ===
| Year | Title | Broadcasting Station | Notes | Ref |
|---|---|---|---|---|
| 2014 | Lux Style Check | Asian TV | 13 Episodes | |
| 2014 | Fair and Handsome: The Ultimate Man | Channel i | 13 Episodes | |
| 2015 | Late Night Coffee | Channel i | Ongoing | |
| 2023 | Abar Proloy | ZEE5 | Indian web series; special appearance in the song "Menoka" | |

=== Radio ===
| Year | Title | Broadcasting Station | Notes | Ref |
|---|---|---|---|---|
| 2013–2014 | Night Shift with Nusrat Faria | Radio Foorti | | |
| 2015 | Love Buds | Radio Foorti | | |

=== Music videos ===
| Year | Song | Featuring | Co-Singer | Label | Notes | Ref |
|---|---|---|---|---|---|---|
| 2018 | "Pataka" | Nusraat Faria | herself | CMV, SVF Music | Music Composer: Pritom Hasan | |
| 2020 | "Ami Chai Thakte" | Nusraat Faria, Master D | Master D | SVF Music | Music Composer: Subir "Master-D" Dev | |
| 2022 | "Habibi" | Nusraat Faria | herself | SVF Music | Music Composer: Adib | |
| 2023 | "Bujhina Toh Tai" | Nusraat Faria | herself and Mumzy Stranger | SVF Music | Music Composer: Badhon and Mumzy Stranger | |
| 2026 | "Loke Boley" | Nusraat Faria | herself and Fuad al Muqtadir | SVF Music, Bling Music | Music composer: Fuad al Muqtadir | |

== Awards and nominations ==
| Year | Award | Film | Category | Result | Ref. |
|---|---|---|---|---|---|
| 2016 | Meril Prothom-Alo Awards | Aashiqui | Best Newcomer (Film and Television) | Won | |
| 2017 | Tele Cine Awards | Badsha - The Don | Best Actress (Bangladesh) | Won | |
| 2021 | CJFB Performance Award | Shahenshah | Best actress | Nominated | |
