= Ziaul Roshan =

Bangladeshi film actor

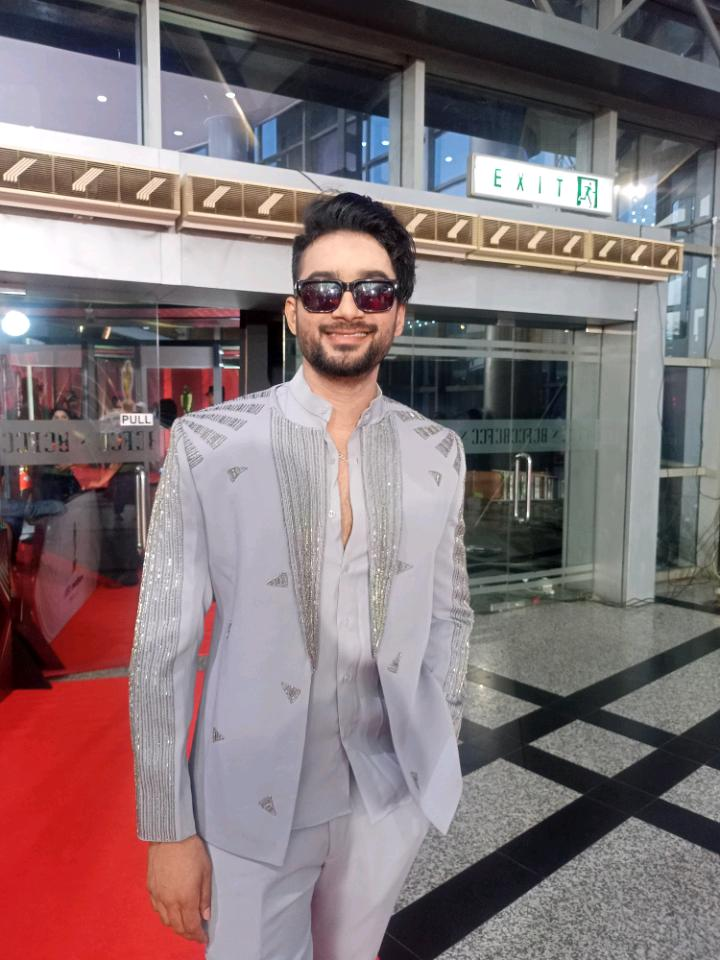
- Born: Akhaura Upazila, Brahmanbaria, Chittagong, Bangladesh
- Occupation: Actor
- Known for: Rokto; Dhat Teri Ki; Beporowa

Ziaul Roshan (Bengali: জিয়াউল রোশান) known mononymously as Roshan, is a Bangladeshi film actor and model who appears in Bangladeshi films. He made his film debut in Rokto (2016).

== Career ==
In 2016 he made his debut in Rokto opposite Porimoni, released both in Bangladesh and India. The film was an Indo-Bangla joint production. Dhat Teri Ki was his second film, with Farin Khan, Arifin Shuvoo and Nusraat Faria Mazhar in opposite roles.

== Filmography ==
=== Feature film ===
Key
†	Denotes films that have not yet been released

Year	Film	Role	Notes	Ref.
2016	Rokto	Roshan	Debut film; Indo-Bangladesh joint production	
2017	Dhat Teri Ki	Salman		
2017	Cockpit	Neel Banerjee	Debut Indian Bengali film	
2019	Beporowa	Rubel		
2021	Chokh	Joy		
2022	Mukhosh	Sayan		
2022	Psycho	Rakib		
2022	Ashirbad	Asad	Based on Bangladesh Liberation War	
2022	Operation Sundarbans	Lieutenant Commander Rishan		
2023	Jinn	Bijoy		
2023	Paap	Jisan		
2024	Maya: The Love	Sajib		
2024	Dead Body	Adnan		
2024	Revenge	Roshan		
2025	Makeup	Pavel		
2026	Sardar Barir Khela	Fulbor		
TBA	Operation Jackpot †	TBA	Announced	

=== Web content ===
Year	Title	Role	Notes	Ref.
2022	Shuklopokkho	Humayun	Webfilm on Chorki	
2022	Karnish	Rajib Khan	Webfilm on Channel i	
2022	Anondi	Rono	Webfilm on RTV	
2023	Apolap	DB Officer Saif Hasan	Released on Deepto TV	
2024	Roilo Baki 10	Jarif	Web series on Toffe	
2025	Hide 'n Seek	Imtiaz Khan	Released on Deepto TV	

== Awards & nominations ==
Year	Awards	Category	Work	Results	Ref.
2024	Global Star Awards	Best Actor	Operation Sundarbans	Won	
