= Angaar (2016 film) =

- Directed by: Wazed Ali Sumon
- Screenplay by: Abdullah Zahir Babu
- Produced by: Abdul Aziz; Himanshu Dhanuka (co-producer)
- Starring: Om; Falguni Rahman Jolly; Ashish Vidyarthi; Amit Hasan; Rajatava Dutta; Rabiul Islam
- Cinematography: Saiful Shaheen
- Edited by: Somnath Dey; Touhid Hossain Chowdhury
- Music by: Ahmed Imtiaz Bulbul; Emon Saha; Akassh
- Production companies: Jaaz Multimedia; Eskay Movies (co-production)
- Distributed by: Jaaz Multimedia; Eskay Movies
- Release date: 15 January 2016
- Countries: Bangladesh; India
- Language: Bengali

Angaar (Bengali: অঙ্গার) is a 2016 Indo-Bangladesh joint production romantic action musical film directed by Wazed Ali Sumon and Nehal Dutta. Produced by Abdul Aziz under the banner of Jaaz Multimedia and co-produced by Himanshu Dhanuka under the banner of Eskay Movies respectively, the film features a cast that includes Om and Jolly in lead roles while Ashish Vidyarthi plays the role of the main antagonist. The first teaser of the film was released on 15 December 2015 and the film was first released on 15 January 2016. The film is a remake of the 2013 Indian Kannada-language film Appayya.

== Synopsis ==
In a northeastern village in Bangladesh far isolated from the modern society, where love is a crime and punishable by death, two individuals fall in love and embrace it, even after knowing their life's fate.

== Cast ==
- Om as Bishu
- Falguni Rahman Jolly as Maya
- Ashish Vidyarthi as Swapan Sarkar
- Amit Hasan
- Rajatava Dutta as Surjo Mandal
- Rabiul Islam
- Ahmed Sharif
- Kharaj Mukherjee

== Production ==
=== Development ===
In May 2015, production company Jaaz Multimedia announced a project with newly introduced actress Jolly in a lead role. Later in the month, Om was cast as the lead male protagonist while Ashish Vidyarthi, Amit Hasan, and Rajatava Dutta were cast to play the main antagonists in the film.

=== Filming ===
Principal photography began during June 2015 with Jolly in Dhaka. Om, Ashish Vidyarthi, Amit Hasan and Rajatava Dutta joined the filming in Bandarban from September 2015. Later that month, the first song from the film was shot in Bandarban. The filming officially came to an end during November 2015.

== Soundtrack ==
Angaar's film soundtrack album is composed by Ahmed Imtiaz Bulbul, Akaash and Emon Saha.

Track listing
No.	Title	Lyrics	Music	Singer(s)	Length
1.	"Kotobaar Bojhabo Bol"	Priyo Chattopadhyay	Akassh	Mohammed Irfan	4:00
2.	"Moner Vitore"	Shah Alam	Emon Saha	Nazmun Munira Nancy, Monir	4:00
3.	"Sobtuku Mon Tomay Dilam"	Shah Alam	Emon Saha	Imran Mahmudul, Kheya	4:20
4.	"Aata Gache"	Priyo Chattopadhyay	Akassh	Kalpana Patowary	3:35
Total length:					15:55

== Reception ==
The album gained popularity among audiences and critics. The first track, Kotobar Bojhabo, was a hit after its release. The track was composed by Akaash and sung by Mohammed Irfan.

== Release ==
Angaar was released in Bangladesh and India on 15 January 2016 in more than 170 screens. The film was distributed by Jaaz Multimedia in Bangladesh while Eskay Movies was given the distribution rights in India.
