= Rokto =

- Theatrical first look
- Directed by: Wajed Ali Sumon
- Produced by: Abdul Aziz
- Starring: Ziaul Roshan; Pori Moni; Ashish Vidyarthi; Amit Hasan
- Cinematography: Saiful Shaheen
- Edited by: Touhid Hossain Chowdhury
- Music by: Akassh; Savvy
- Production company: Jaaz Multimedia
- Distributed by: Jaaz Multimedia; Eskay Movies
- Release dates: 12 September 2016 (Bangladesh); 23 December 2016 (India)
- Countries: Bangladesh; India
- Language: Bengali

Rokto (English: Blood) is a 2016 Indian-Bangladeshi action film directed by Wajed Ali Sumon and produced by Abdul Aziz under the banner of Jaaz Multimedia. The film stars newcomer Ziaul Roshan and Pori Moni in lead roles. This film is a remake of 2013 Tollywood (Telugu) film Chandee. Which itself was a remake of the 1996 Hollywood film The Long Kiss Goodnight.

== Plot ==
The antagonist here plans to set a bomb blast in the SAARC summit to be held in Kolkata, organised by seven countries. By doing so, he intends to shake the political conditions of the seven countries, so that he and his team can easily run their illegal arms and explosives businesses in those countries and can easily smuggle them. Agent Sania ruins their plan and the summit takes place fruitfully.

== Cast ==
- Pori Moni as Agent Sania Sarkar
- Ziaul Roshan as Roshan Chowdhury
- Ashish Vidyarthi as RAW Chief, the main antagonist
- Prasun Guin
- Subrata
- Biplab Chatterjee as Home Minister Ratan Sinha
- Raja Dutta
- Amit Hassan as Bosco
- Meghna Halder

== Production and release ==
It is produced by Jaaz Multimedia and Eskay Movies. It was an India-Bangladesh joint venture film. It was released in over 100 theatres in Bangladesh on 12 September 2016 (Eid al-Adha). The Daily Star described Rotko's box office performance as "mediocre".

== Soundtrack ==
No.	Title	Lyrics	Music	Artist(s)	Length
1.	"Pori"	Priyo Chattopadhyay	Akassh	Kanika Kapoor, Akaash	3:13
2.	"Dhim Tana"	Priyo Chattopadhyay	Savvy	Akriti Kakar	3:39
3.	"Heart Beat"	Priyo Chattopadhyay	Akassh	Nakash Aziz, Nandini	2:59
4.	"Jante Jodi Chao"	Priyo Chattopadhyay	Akassh	Mohammed Irfan	3:54
