= Om Sahani =

Indian actor

Om Prakash Sahani
- Born: Om Prakash Sahani; 15 December; Kolkata, West Bengal, India
- Occupation: Actor
- Years active: 2011–present
- Spouse: Mimi Dutta

Om Prakash Sahani is an Indian actor who works in Bengali films from both West Bengal and Bangladesh, as well as television shows. He made his acting debut with Arjun: Kalimpong E Sitaharan (2013). He gained wider recognition with films like Agnee 2 (2015), Angaar (2016), Hero 420 (2016), and Prem Ki Bujhini (2016). His other notable works include Pashan (2018), Bhokatta (2019), Gotro (2019), and Hullor (2020).

Om Sahani and actress Mimi Dutta have been in a relationship for over a decade.

== Career ==
Om started his career by modeling and television appearances. He was a participant of Fata Fati Filmy Fight ( A Reality Show of ETV Bangla). He gained popularity in the television series Alor Basha. He made his feature film acting debut in Arjun: Kalimpong E Sitaharan as the title character Arjun, a young detective. He followed this with the 2014 film Action directed by Sayantan Mukherjee and co-starring Barkha Bisht Sengupta. In 2015, he starred in the box office hit film Agnee 2 with Mahiya Mahi.

Om starred in three films in 2016: Angaar, Hero 420, and Prem Ki Bujhini with Subhashree Ganguly.

== Television ==
- Alor Basha (2009) on Ruposhi Bangla
- Didi No. 1 (2021) aired on Zee Bangla
- Dance Bangla Dance (2021) as Mentor aired on Zee Bangla
- Love Biye Aaj Kal (2023) on Star Jalsha
- Abar Proloy 2 (2026) on

Zee5

== Films ==
Year	Films	Role	Director	Notes
2013	Arjun: Kalimpong E Sitaharan	Arjun	Prem Prakash Modi	Debut Film
2014	Action	Aakash	Sayantan Mukherjee	
2015	Agnee 2	Eshaan	Iftakar Chowdhury	Indo-Bangladesh joint production
2016	Angaar	Bishu	Wajed Ali Sumon	Indo-Bangladesh joint production
2016	Hero 420	Krissh	Sujit Mondal, Saikat Nasir	Indo-Bangladesh joint production
2016	Prem Ki Bujhini	Prithviraaj aka Raaj	Sudipto Sarkar	Indo-Bangladesh joint production
2018	Pashan	Roni	Saikat Nasir	Bangladeshi Film
2018	Tui Sudhu Amar		Joydip Mukherjee, Anonno Mamun	Indo-Bangladesh joint production
2019	Bhokatta		Ramesh Rout	
2019	Gotro	Himself	Nandita Roy and Shiboprosad Mukherjee	Cameo appearance in "Rongoboti" song
2020	Hullor		Abhimanyu Mukherjee	
2020	Lockdown Diary – Bor Ashbe Ekkhoni	Raja Gopalan Bala Subhramanyam	Abhimanyu Mukherjee	Television Film
2020	Dadur Kirti		Pathikrit Basu	Television Film
2021	Lockdown		Abhimanyu Mukherjee	
2022	Bhoy Peona			
2022	Haluaman		Abhimanyu Mukherjee	Special appearance
2022	Clown		Rik Chatterjee	
2025	Binodiini: Ekti Natir Upakhyan	Kumar Bahadur	Ram Kamal Mukherjee	
2025	Hungama .com		Dr. Krishnendu Chatterjee	
2025	Raghu Dakat		Dhrubo Banerjee	
2026	Hok Kolorob		Raj Chakraborty	
2026	Uranchu		Anshuman Pratyush	
