= Jeet filmography =

List of performances by Indian actor Jeet

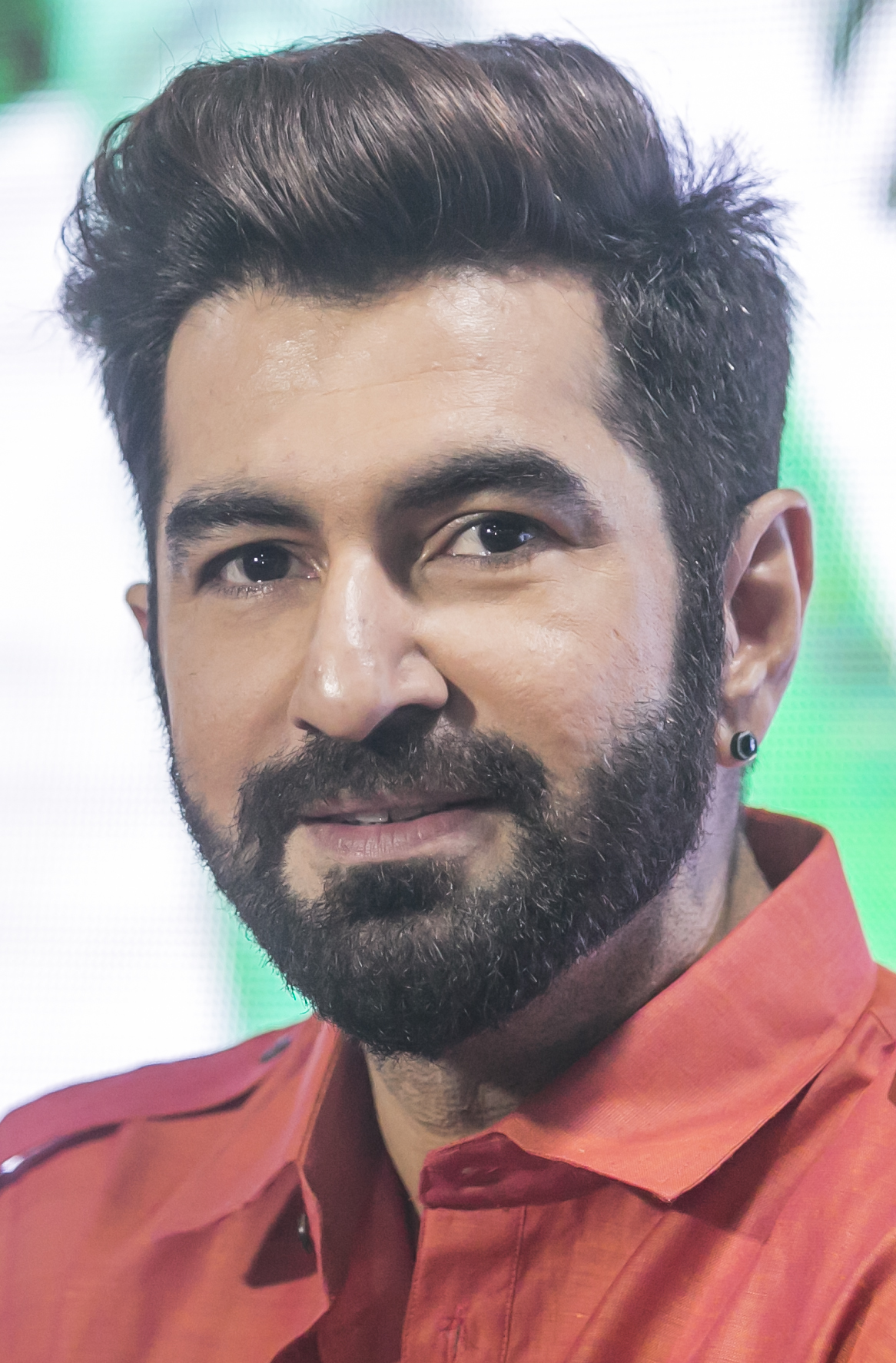
- Jeet
- Film: 50+
- Television series: 10+
- Hosting: 1
- Music videos: 2

Jeet is an Indian actor, producer and television presenter who is primarily known for his work in Bengali cinema. Jeet started his modeling career in 1993. His first acting assignment was Vish Briksha (1996), when he was only 18 years old.a Hindi TV series directed by Bishnu Palchaudhuri. He made his big screen debut with Daughters of This Century (1995) directed by Tapan Sinha and produced by Shunya Media. Mohan Das of Eon Films was the Associate Producer of the film. Thereafter, he went on to play the lead for the first time in Chandu (2001), a Telugu film. His first success came in 2002, opposite Priyanka Trivedi, through Sathi, a highly successful romantic drama, directed by Haranath Chakraborty, for which he won the Bengal Film Journalists' Association – Most Promising Actor Award and Anandalok Awards for Best Actor. In the same year, he acted in the Bengali remake of Jo Jeeta Wohi Sikandar. This initial success was followed by other critical and commercial successes, including Nater Guru, Sangee, Bandhan and Yuddho. In 2003, he acted alongside Koel Mallick in Nater Guru, which was released to critical and commercial success and fetched him his second Anandalok Award for Best Actor. He also starred in some commercial failures, including Saathihara, Priyotoma, and Ghatak Jor, which was more successful.

2010 proved to be a commercially successful year for Jeet as he starred in Wanted and Dui Prithibi, both of which were critically and commercially successful ventures; the latter being the highest grosser of 2010, according to a study conducted by FICCI and Deloitte. In 2013, he appeared in the crime thriller Boss: Born to Rule, which was Jeet's first pan-India release. The film proved to be one of the biggest hits of 2013, grossing ₹6.75 crore (US$720,000) and also earned him his first Filmfare Awards East nomination.

From 2014 to 2016, he starred in many films, including four critically and commercially successful ventures – the psychological thriller The Royal Bengal Tiger, the comedy thriller Bachchan, the action comedy Badsha The Don and the action drama Abhimaan. In 2018, the action thriller film Bagh Bandi Khela released on 16 November 2018. In 2020 he starred in Asur. In 2022, he starred in the action thriller Raavan and in 2023 he starred in Chengiz, both of which was commercially successful. For Raavan he won the Bengali Film & Television Award for Best Actor. Chengiz became the first Bengali film to be released simultaneously in both Bengali and Hindi languages.

In television, he appeared on several reality shows and also hosted some, including Koti Takar Baaji and Bigg Boss Bangla.

== Feature films ==
Key
†	Denotes films that have not yet been released

Year	Title	Role	Notes	Ref.
1995	Daughters of This Century		Hindi film; Cameo appearance	
2001	Chandu	Chandu	Telugu film Credited as Pavan Kumar	
2002	Sathi	Bijoy	Debut Bengali Film, Bengal Film Journalists' Association – Most Promising Actor Award, Anandalok Puraskar for Best Actor	
2003	Amar Mayer Shapath	Surya / Deva (Note: Jeet performed dual roles in the film.)		
2003	Nater Guru	Rabindranath "Rabi" Maitra		
2003	Champion	Raja		
2003	Sangee	Bijoy		
2004	Shakti	Shakti		
2004	Aakrosh	Abhimanyu Das / Abhi (Note: Jeet played a single character in the film who has two different names.)		
2004	Premi	Rahul		
2004	Mastan	Raja / Babu Qamar		
2004	Bandhan	Rohit Banerjee		
2005	Manik	Samir Mitra / Manik	Anandalok Awards for Best Actor	
2005	Sathihara	Joy		
2005	Yuddho	Surya Sinha		
2005	Subhodrishti	Arun		
2006	Hero	Shubhankar "Shuvo" Roy		
2006	Kranti	Jeetendra "Jeet" Ghosh		
2006	Priyotoma	Akash	Anandalok Puraskar for Best Upcoming Star (Male)	
2006	Ghatak	Bijoy		
2007	Pitribhumi	Jayanta Dutta / Rajanta Dutta	29 June 2007 Release	
2007	Krishnakanter Will	Gobindalal	Based on Bankim Chandra Chattopadhyay's story, Anandalok Awards for Best Actor 5 Oct 2007 Release	
2007	Bidhatar Lekha	Subhankar / Abhijit	7 Dec 2007 Release	
2008	Jor	Surya		
2008	Pyar Jab Kenhu Se Hoi Jala	Vijay	Debut Bhojpuri Film	
2008	Partner	Ayan Roy		
2009	Saat Paake Bandha	Rahul Banerjee		
2009	Neel Akasher Chandni	Akash		
2009	Hanshi Khushi Club	Aniket		
2010	Wanted	Rajkumar "Raja" Banerjee / Shibu	Zee Bangla Gourab Somman Awards for Best Actor, Anandalok Puraskar for Best Actor (Male)	
2010	Josh	Indradeep "Indra" Chowdhury		
2010	Dui Prithibi	Rahul Roy	30th film	
2011	Fighter: Hoy Marbo Noy Morbo	Surya Kumar Bose	Zee Bangla Gourab Samman Awards for Best Actor Male, Tele Cine Awards for Best Actor; Also producer	
2011	Shotru	SI Dibakar Singha IPS		
2011	Hello Memsaheb	Megh Chatterjee		
2012	100% Love	Rahul Majumder	Also producer	
2012	Awara	Surya Narayan	BFJA Award for Best Actor Male	
2013	Deewana	Abhimanyu	Tele Cine Awards for Best Actor, Tele Cine Awards for Best Jodi with Srabanti Chatterjee	
2013	Boss: Born to Rule	Surya Bhai	Kalakar Awards as The King of Tollywood; Nominated—Filmfare Awards East for Best Actor; Also producer	
2014	Game: He Plays To Win	DIA Abhimanyu Chatterjee	Also producer	
2014	Bachchan	Bachchu / Bijoy Bachchan	Also producer	
2015	Besh Korechi Prem Korechi	Aditya "Adi" Ghoshal		
2016	Power	Jeetu / ACP Bir Pratap Chowdhury		
2016	Badsha – The Don	Badsha	Indo-Bangladesh joint production	
2016	Abhimaan	Aditya "Adi" Dev Burman / Deepankar "Deep" Roy	Also producer	
2017	Boss 2: Back to Rule	Surya Bhai	Also producer; Indo-Bangladesh joint production	
2018	Inspector Notty K	Inspector Natobor "Notty K" Khara	Also producer	
2018	Sultan: The Saviour	Raja Dutta / Sultan	Also producer	
2018	Bagh Bandi Khela	Barin Ghatak / Bagh		
2019	Baccha Shoshur	Spandan Islam / Spidey	Also producer	
2019	Shesh Theke Shuru	Mahid Sheikh	Also producer	
2019	Panther: Hindustan Meri Jaan	Panther	Also producer	
2020	Asur	Kigan Mandi	Also producer	
2021	Baazi	Aditya "Adi" Mukherjee	Also producer	
2022	Raavan	Ram Mukherjee / Raavan	Bengali Film & Television Award for Best Actor	
2023	Chengiz	Jaidev "Chengiz" Singh / Daniel D' Souza	Bengali Film & Television Award for Best Actor, Also producer	
2023	Manush: Child of Destiny	NCB Officer Arjun Mukherjee / Victor	Also producer	
2024	Boomerang	Samar Sen / Amar	Also producer	
2026	Keu Bole Biplobi Keu Bole Dakat	Ananta Singh	Based on the life of Indian revolutionary Ananta Singh	

== Television and web-series ==
Year	Title	Role	Language	Platform	Notes	Ref.
1994	Vish Briksha	Taracharan	Bengali	Doordarshan		
1994–95	Sei Raate Raat Chhilo		Bengali			
1995	Janani	Anil	Bengali	Channel 8		
1995	Bhabna		Bengali			
1998	Jai Hanuman	Unnamed	Hindi	DD National	Cameo	
1998	Aahat	Inspector	Hindi	SET	Cameo; Story segment: Raaz	
2025	Khakee: The Bengal Chapter	IPS Arjun Maitra	Hindi	Netflix	OTT debut	

== Music videos ==
Year	Film Name/Album	Songs	Composer(s)	Singer(s)	Music Label	Language	Notes
1997	Loriyaan	Kuch Kuch.........	—Unknown—	Shoma Banerjee, Audio- Hello Baby	T-Series	Hindi	
1997	Bewafa Tera Masoom Chehra	Bewafa Tera Masoom Chehra	Ram Shankar	Mohammad Aziz	T-Series	Hindi	

== Credits as a producer ==
His film production company is known by the banner "Jeetz Filmworks"/"Grassroot Entertainment".

Year	Title
2011	Fighter : Hoy Marbo Noy Morbo
2012	100% Love
2013	Deewana
2013	Boss: Born to Rule
2014	The Royal Bengal Tiger
2014	Game: He Plays to Win
2014	Bachchan
2016	Abhimaan
2017	Boss 2: Back to Rule
2018	Inspector Notty K
2018	Sultan: The Saviour
2019	Baccha Shoshur
2019	Shesh Theke Shuru
2019	Panther: Hindustan Meri Jaan
2020	Asur
2020	Switzerland
2021	Baazi
2022	Raavan
2022	Aay Khuku Aay
2023	Chengiz
2023	Manush: Child of Destiny
2024	Boomerang

=== List of television producer credits ===
Television soaps/series	Channel name
Kotha O Kahini	Colors Bangla
Bidhir Bidhan	Star Jalsha
Meera	Colors Bangla

== Credits as a singer ==
Film	Songs	Composers	Year
Bachchan	Tatka Priya Marie	Jeet Gannguli	2014
Big Boss	Big Boss	Title Track	2016
Sultan: The Saviour	Eid Mubarak	Suddho Roy	2018
Switzerland	Dhak Baja Komor Nacha	Savvy	2020

== Reality shows ==
Year	Title	Role	Channel	Ref.
2008	Star of Bengal	Host	Zee Bangla	
2011-12	Koti Takar Baaji	Host	Star Jalsha	
2016	Bigg Boss Bangla season 2	Host	Colors Bangla	
2021	Dance Bangla Dance Season 11	Judge	Zee Bangla	
2022	Ismart Jodi :- season 01	Host	Star Jalsha	

== Other ==
List of other film credits
Year	Title	Role	Ref.
2020	Dhira	(Voice role and narrator)	
