= List of awards and nominations received by Jeet =

Jeet awards and nominations
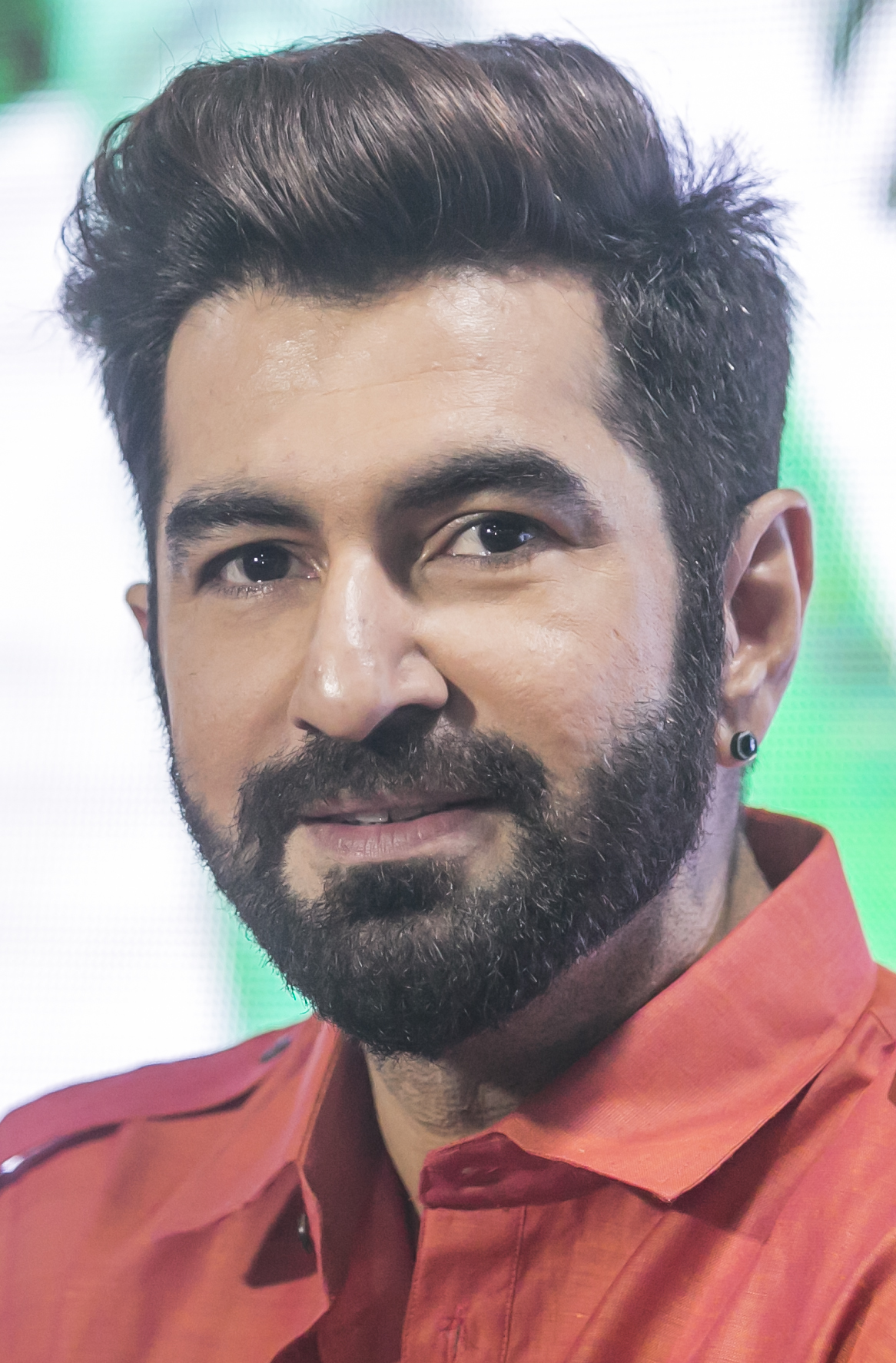
- Jeet in 2017
Awards and nominations
Award	Wins	Nominations
Anandalok Puraskar	7	8
Bangla Sangeet Chalacchitra Samman	2	0
BBFA Awards	1	1
BFJA Awards	5	6
Bengali Film & Television Award	2	0
Uttam Kumar Awards	3	0
Kishore Kumar Awards	1	0
ETV Awards	2	0
Films and Frames Digital Film Awards	1	0
Filmfare Awards East	0	3
Filmfare Awards Bangla	0	1
Filmfare Glamour and Style Awards	2	0
International Indo-Bangla Kala Music Awards	1	0
IWM Digital Awards	1	1
Kalakar Awards	5	0
Star Jalsha Entertainment Awards	2	0
Star Jalsha Paribar Awards	1	0
Tele Cine Awards	5	2
TV9 Bangla Ghorer Bioscope Awards	1	0
WBFJA Awards	0	5
Zee 24 Ghanta Ananya Samman	1	0
Zee Bangla Gourab Somman	1	2

Totals (Note: Certain award groups do not simply award one winner. They acknowledge several different recipients, have runners-up, and have third place. Since this is a specific recognition and is different from losing an award, runner-up mentions are considered wins in this award tally. For simplification and to avoid errors, each award in this list has been presumed to have had a prior nomination.)
- Wins: 44
- Nominations: 68

Jeet is an Indian actor and singer who works in Bengali cinema.

== Anandalok Puraskar ==
Year	Category	Nominee / Work	Result
2003	Best Actor	Sathi	Won
2004	Best Actor	Sangee	Nominated
2005	Best Actor	Manik	Won
2005	Best Actor	Bandhan	Nominated
2008	Best Actor	Krishnakanter Will	Nominated
2008	Best Actor	Jor	Nominated
2011	Best Actor	Wanted	Nominated
2012	Best Actor	Shotru	Nominated
2004	Best Action Hero	Nater Guru	Won
2005	Best Action Hero	Aakrosh	Won
2007	Best Action Hero	Ghatak	Nominated
2002	Best Debut (Male)	Sathi	Nominated
2006	Best Upcoming Star (Male)	Priyotoma	Won
2006	Most Glamorous Star	Priyotoma	Won
2005	Most Promising Actor	Bandhan	Won

2026- 
    Best actor 
             [Keu bole biplobi keu bole dakat](2026 flim).

== Bangla Sangeet Chalachitra Samman ==
Year	Category	Nominee / Work	Result
2003	Best Actor	Sathi	Won
2005	Best Actor	Shakti	Won

== BBFA Awards ==
Year	Category	Nominee / Work	Result
2019	Best Actor	Shesh Theke Shuru	Nominated
2019	Most Popular Actor	Shesh Theke Shuru	Won

== BFJA Awards ==
Year	Category	Nominee / Work	Result
2005	Best Actor	Bandhan	Won
2007	Best Actor	Kranti	Won
2003	Most Promising Actor	Sathi	Won
2008	Most Outstanding Work of the Year Award	Pitribhumi	Won
2007	Youth Icon of Bengali cinema	—	Won

== Uttam Kumar Awards ==
Year	Category	Nominee / Work	Result	Ref.
2003	—	Sathi	Won	
2004	—	Nater Guru	Won	
2008	—	Pitribhumi	Won	

== Kishore Kumar Awards ==
Year	Category	Nominee / Work	Result	Ref.
2003	—	Sathi	Won	

== BFTA Awards ==
Year	Category	Nominee / Work	Result
2023	Best Actor (Male)	Raavan	Won
2024	Best Actor (Male)	Chengiz	Won

== ETV Awards ==
Year	Category	Nominee / Work	Result
2006	Best Actor	Manik	Won
2007	Best Actor	Kranti	Won

== Films and Frames Digital Film Awards ==
Year	Category	Nominee / Work	Result	Ref.
2020	Best Actor (Popular)	Asur	Won	

== Filmfare Awards East ==
Year	Category	Nominee / Work	Result	Ref.
2014	Best Actor	Boss	Nominated	
2017	Best Actor	Power	Nominated	
2018	Best Actor	Boss 2	Nominated	

== Filmfare Awards Bangla ==
Year	Category	Nominee / Work	Result	Ref.
2024	Best Actor	Manush	Nominated	

== Filmfare Glamour and Style Awards Bangla ==
Year	Category	Nominee / Work	Result
2025	Most Stylish Star (Male)	—	Won
2025	Trailblazer of the Year	—	Won

== International Indo-Bangla Kala Music award ==
Year	Category	Nominee / Work	Result
2004	Best Actor	Nater Guru	Won

== IWM Digital Awards ==
Year	Category	Nominee / Work	Result	Ref.
2025	Best Actor (Web Series)	Khakee: The Bengal Chapter	Nominated	
2025	Most Popular Actor (Web Series)	Khakee: The Bengal Chapter	Won	

== Kalakar Awards ==
Year	Category	Nominee / Work	Result	Ref.
2002	Best Rising Actor	Sathi	Won	
2005	Best Actor	Bandhan	Won	
2006	Best Actor	Priyotoma	Won	
2009	Best Actor	Krishnakanter Will	Won	
2014	Best Actor	Boss	Won	
2014	King of Tollywood	—	Won	

== Star Jalsha Entertainment Awards ==
Year	Category	Nominee / Work	Result
2002	Best Actor	Sathi	Won
2011	Best Superhit Hero	Dui Prithibi	Nominated
2011	Best Pair (with Koel Mallick)	Dui Prithibi	Nominated
2012	Best Action Hero	Fighter	Won

== Star Jalsha Paribar Awards ==
Year	Category	Nominee / Work	Result
2012	Best Host	Koti Takar Baaji	Won

== Tele Cine Awards ==
Year	Category	Nominee / Work	Result	Ref.
2012	Best Actor	Fighter	Won	
2013	Best Actor	Awara	Nominated	
2013	Best Actor	Deewana	Won	
2013	Best Actor	100% Love	Nominated	
2012	Best Jodi (with Koel Mallick)	Dui Prithibi	Won	
2013	Best Jodi (with Srabanti Chatterjee)	Deewana	Won	
2017	Best Host	Bigg Boss Bangla Season 2	Won	

== TV9 Bangla Ghorer Bioscope Awards ==
Year	Category	Nominee / Work	Result	Ref.
2024	Special Honour for Contributions to the Film Industry	–	Won	

== WBFJA Award ==
Year	Category	Nominee / Work	Result	Ref.
2021	Best Actor	Asur	Nominated	
2017	Most Popular Actor	Abhimaan	Nominated	
2018	Most Popular Actor	Boss 2	Nominated	
2023	Most Popular Actor	Raavan	Nominated	
2025	Most Popular Actor	Boomerang	Nominated	

== Zee 24 Ghanta Ananya Samman ==
Year	Category	Nominee / work	Result
2024	Lifetime Achievement Award	–	Won

== Zee Bangla Gourab Samman ==
Year	Category	Nominee / Work	Result
2010	Best Actor	Wanted	Won
2012	Best Actor	Shotru	Nominated
2014	Best Actor	Boss	Nominated
