= Baccha Shoshur =

2019 Bengali comedy film

- Theatrical release poster
- Directed by: Biswarup Biswas
- Written by: Pavel
- Produced by: Jeet; Nispal Singh; Gopal Madnani; Amit Jumrani
- Starring: Jeet; Koushani Mukherjee; Chiranjit Chakraborty
- Cinematography: Supriyo Dutta; Joydeep Bose
- Edited by: Moloy Laha
- Music by: Suddho Roy; Maharshi Dutta; Amit-Ishan; Sayantan- Souptik
- Production companies: Jeetz Filmworks; Surinder Films
- Distributed by: Grassroot Entertainment
- Release date: 8 February 2019
- Country: India
- Language: Bengali

Baccha Shoshur is a 2019 Indian Bengali-language satirical fantasy comedy film directed by Biswaroop Biswas. Written by Pavel, the film stars Jeet, Koushani Mukherjee, Aman Mehra and Chiranjit Chakraborty along with Biswaroop Biswas in the leading roles. The film was released on 8 February 2019.

== Plot ==
Spondan Islam sees his father-in-law in his son. Soon after, chaos arises. Spondan brings his son to a woman to try exorcism. When his wife Jonaki learns about this, she is convinced that Spondan is mentally unstable, so Jonaki is forced to keep Spondan in a mental hospital.

== Cast ==
- Jeet as Spandan aka Spidey
- Koushani Mukherjee as Jonaki
- Aman Mehra
- Chiranjit Chakraborty as Jonaki's father
- Biswarup Biswas
- Urmimala Basu
- Ambarish Bhattacharya
- Kushal Chakraborty
- Anamika Saha
- Jagannath Basu as Pratul

== Production ==
The film was announced by Surinder Films and Jeet through their respective Twitter handles with the release of the first poster on 24 December 2018 on the eve of Christmas. It was touted that Pavel would be directing the film but the film's first poster created confusion which got cleared when it was announced that though Pavel had written the screenplay and dialogues for the film, his assistant Biswarup Biswas would be directing it.

== Soundtrack ==
Baccha Shoshur

Soundtrack album by Suddho Roy, Maharshi Dutta, Amit-Ishan, Sayantan- Souptik
- Released: 5 February 2019
- Recorded: 2018
- Genre: Feature film soundtrack
- Length: 21:11
- Language: Bengali
- Label: Grassroot Entertainment

Suddho Roy, Maharshi Dutta, Amit-Ishan, Sayantan- Souptik chronology
Sultan: The Saviour (2018)	Baccha Shoshur (2019)

Singles from Baccha Shoshur
- 1. "Baba Dayal" Released: 21 Jan 2019; 2. "Mari Jaan" Released: 25 Jan 2019; 3. "Saiyaan Re" Released: 29 Jan 2019; 4. "Purano Sai Diner Katha" Released: 4 Feb 2019; 5. "O Maa" Released: 5 Mar 2019

Track listing
No.	Title	Lyrics	Music	Singer(s)	Length
1.	"Baba Dayal"	Suddho Roy	Suddho Roy	Suddho Roy & Pankaj Natta	3:59
2.	"Meri Jaan"	Maharshi Dutta	Maharshi Dutta	Anupam Roy	3:29
3.	"Saiyaan Re"	Pavel	Pavel	Ishan Mitra	4:41
4.	"Purano Sei Diner Kotha"	Rabindranath Tagore, Pavel	Sayantan-Souptik	Srikanto Acharya, Swagatalakshmi Dasgupta	4:57
5.	"O Maa"	Pavel, Smriti Mukherjee	Amit-Ishan	Ishan Mitra	4:36
Total length:					21:11
