= Bachchan (2014 film) =

2014 Indian Bengali film

- Bachchan Theatrical Poster
- Directed by: Raja Chanda
- Screenplay by: N.K. Salil
- Story by: Pon Kumaran
- Produced by: Reliance Entertainment; Grassroot Entertainment Pvt. Ltd
- Starring: Jeet; Aindrita Ray; Payel Sarkar; Kanchan Mullick
- Edited by: Md. Kalam
- Music by: Jeet Gannguli
- Production companies: Reliance Entertainment; Grassroot Entertainment Pvt. Ltd
- Distributed by: Reliance Entertainment; Grassroot Entertainment Pvt. Ltd
- Release date: 26 September 2014
- Running time: 148 minutes
- Country: India
- Language: Bengali

Bachchan is a 2014 Indian Bengali-language masala film directed by Raja Chanda and produced and distributed under the banners of Reliance Entertainment and Grassroot Entertainment Pvt. Ltd. The film features actors Jeet, Aindrita Ray and Payel Sarkar in the lead roles. The movie is an official remake of 2011 Kannada movie Vishnuvardhana.

== Plot ==
Bacchu a.k.a. Bijay is a die-hard fan of Amitabh Bachchan, who kept the latter's name Vijay (from the films Deewar and Coolie) and also adopted the surname of the legend. Bijay is the son of a washerman Ramesh, who doesn't want to be like his father, but dreams of earning a million bucks. He has an astrologer friend Shankar who predicts his future and tells him that his fortunes would change. While delivering the clothes washed and ironed by his father, to a retired Colonel, he falls in love with the latter's younger daughter Priya. Bijay finds out that Priya was set to meet Dr.Partho Sarathi Chatterjee, a suitor as instructed by her father. Bijay, with his friend Shankar, reaches the hospital and pretends to be a doctor to Priya trying to gently woo her. After some hilarious situations, Priya realizes Bijay's true identity, but soon finds his antics adorable, forgives him, and also reciprocates his feelings. One day riding through the streets, Bijay gets into a tussle with a few goons and is arrested. Later, he discovers that the goons are the henchmen of an Underworld King named Master. Bijay, hiding behind a chair, requests the police officer not to reveal him to Master. After being released from the police station, Bijay finds a mobile phone which had accidentally fallen from Master's pocket. Master gets a call from his mobile phone and the unknown caller offers to return the phone. But Bijay, who is the unknown caller demands money for it. Master tries all means to get the phone from Bijay, containing a video of Police Commissioner Dibakar Saha blackmailing the commissioner to hide the files of Master from everyone. On the other hand, Bijay extracts money from Master by doing various things(such as kidnapping Master's brother, etc.). The twist in this cat-and-mouse game comes in the form of Trisha, who wants Master to be killed due to some reason. The rest of the film discloses the secrets regarding the video of the cellphone, the reasons why Trisha wants Master to be killed, and at last what Bijay does after hearing the secrets disclosed by Trisha.

== Cast ==
- Jeet as Bacchu aka Bijoy Bachchan
- Aindrita Ray as Priya
- Payel Sarkar as Trisha
- Mukul Dev as Master, a underworld gangster
- Ashish Vidyarthi as Police Commissioner Dibakar Saha
- Kanchan Mullick as astrologer Shankar Ghoshal, Bijoy's Friend
- Kharaj Mukherjee as Retired Colonel, Priya's Father
- Sangharshi Sinha as Latika
- Somnath Kar as Master's henchman
- Supriyo Dutta as Ramesh, Bijoy's Father
- Saheb Chatterjee as Dr. Partha Sarathi Chatterjee (Cameo appearance)
- Subhashree Ganguly in an Item number song "Latai" (Special appearance)

== Production ==
=== Development ===
Bachchan is produced jointly under the banners of Reliance Entertainment and Grassroot Entertainment. The plot consists of an interesting incident, which is centered around Amitabh Bachchan. This justifies the very naming of the film, according to director Raja Chanda.

=== Casting ===
Bachchan marks the Bengali debut of Kannada actress Aindrita Ray, who was signed for this film to play the character of the female lead opposite Jeet. She confirmed that she was playing the role which was played by Bhavana in Vishnuvardhana. Regarding her casting, Aindrita said, "It is a complete coincidence that my first Bengali film happens to be a remake of a Kannada film. I think this symbolizes me, for these are the two languages that I connect most to. The hero, director and banner are the best that Tollywood can offer. I couldn't think of anything bigger in terms of a debut. Bachchan also marks the first pairing of two renowned Tollywood faces, Jeet and Payel Sarkar. According to Payel, her role in the film is a vital one and there is a depth in that character. Mukul Dev was also confirmed as a main antagonist in the movie. He is the first choice of the director and producer after his strong main antagonist role in 2012 Bengali Blockbuster movie Awara With Jeet. Subhashree Ganguly was also confirmed to make a special appearance in an item number.

=== Filming ===
Filming of Bachchan started from 6 November 2013. Shooting locations include a shopping mall at Howrah.All the song videos will be shot out of India. Some video songs are shot in Portugal.

== Soundtrack ==
Bachchan

Soundtrack album by Jeet Gannguli
- Released: 2014
- Recorded: 2013
- Genre: Feature film soundtrack
- Length: 16:15
- Language: Bengali
- Label: T-Series
- Producers: Reliance Entertainment, Grassroot Entertainment

Jeet Gannguli chronology
Arundhati (2014)	Bachchan (2014)	Herogiri (2015)

Singles from Bachchan
- 1. "Bachchan (Title Track)" Released: 8 August 2014; 2. "Sundori Kamala" Released: 22 August 2014; 3. "Tatka Priya Marie" Released: 6 September 2014; 4. "Latai" Released: 15 September 2014

All lyrics are written by Raja Chanda, Traditional; all music is composed by Jeet Gannguli

Track listing
No.	Title	Lyrics	Artist(s)	Length
1.	"Bachchan (Title Track)"	Raja Chanda	Benny Dayal	3:52
2.	"Shundori Komola"	Raja Chanda, Traditional	Jeet Gannguli	4:13
3.	"Tatka Priya Marie"	Raja Chanda	Jeet	3:37
4.	"Latai"	Raja Chanda	Vinod Rathod & Akriti Kakkar	4:33
Total length:				16:15

== Critical response ==
Upam Buzarbaruah of The Times of India rated it and told "Bachchan is a film you can watch if you like going brain-dead for a couple of hours after a hectic day. It's an entertainer through and through".

Nowrunning rated it and commented "Bachchan is a power packed entertainment. Pick your seat and just hold on to your seats for the next two hours, as the screen explodes with colours of love and sweat of action."
