= Chandu (2001 film) =

2001 Telugu film by Veeru K.

- Directed by: Veeru K.
- Written by: Veeru K. (Story, screenplay & dialogues)
- Produced by: Manepalli Manikyala Rao; M. L. V. Kumari (Presenter)
- Starring: Pavan Kumar; Preethi Vijayakumar; Archana
- Music by: Veeru K.
- Production company: Sri Raghavendra Krupa Creations
- Release date: 31 August 2001
- Running time: 148 minutes
- Country: India
- Language: Telugu

Chandu is a 2001 Indian Telugu-language romantic drama film written and directed by Veeru K., who also composed the music. Produced by Manepalli Manikyala Rao, the film stars Jeet (credited as "Pavan Kumar") in his cinematic debut, alongside Preethi, and Archana in lead roles. Released on 31 August 2001, the film was a failure at the box office.

Following the film's failure, Jeet transitioned to the Bengali film industry, where he gained widespread success and emerged as one of its leading stars.

== Plot ==
Pavan's father arranges his engagement to Preethi, the daughter of his childhood friend. Although Pavan has not seen Preethi since their childhood, he agrees to the marriage. Curious to meet her before the wedding, he visits her house secretly without informing his parents. There, he encounters Archana, a friend of Preethi, who falsely introduces herself as Preethi.

Unaware of the deception, Pavan falls in love with Archana, and she reciprocates his feelings. However, the truth is revealed on the day of the engagement. Despite his feelings for Archana, Pavan feels compelled to proceed with the marriage when Archana insists that Preethi's life would be at risk if the engagement is called off.

As the story unfolds, the emotional conflict continues until the truth about Pavan and Archana's love is exposed. In a selfless act, Preethi sacrifices her love for Pavan and decides to leave for America, allowing Pavan and Archana to be together.

== Cast ==
- Pavan Kumar as Chandu
- Preethi
- Archana
- Kavitha
- Brahmanandam
- Chinna
- AVS
- Sivaji Raja
- Uttej

== Production ==
Chandu marked the film debut of Jeet, credited under the screen name Pavan Kumar. Before venturing into films, Jeet had gained experience by working in television serials and advertisements. The film also served as the Telugu debut for Kannada actress Archana. Preetha Vijayakumar, the daughter of veteran Tamil actor Vijayakumar, rechristened herself as Preethi Reddy for this film.

The title Chandu was originally considered for a project starring Venkatesh, directed by Udayasankar. However, the title was later secured by producer Manepalli Manikyala Rao for this film. According to Idlebrain.com, the practice of small-scale producers registering titles or stories resembling high-profile projects to capitalize on their publicity was common in the industry. This film was cited as an example of such a trend. Similar instances had occurred previously with films like Kushi (2001) and Narasimha Naidu (2001). Ultimately, the project with Venkatesh and Udayasankar was released under the title Prematho Raa (2001).

== Music ==
The music for the film was composed by Veeru K., with lyrics penned by Guru Charan and Sirivennela Sitarama Sastri. The audio soundtrack was released under the Aditya Music label. The song "Premincha" became popular at the time.

Chandu track listing
No.	Title	Singer(s)	Length
1.	"Chulbulee Bulbulee"	Udit Narayan, Hema Sardesai	3:37
2.	"Time Pass"	Raju Singh	4:10
3.	"Veyi Janmala Aasa"	Unni Krishnan, Sadhana Sargam	3:54
4.	"Premincha"	Rajesh, Annupamaa	4:55
5.	"Prema Nee Chirunama"	Nityasree, Jojo, Ramu Chanchal	3:56
6.	"Kallo Neeve"	KK, Preethi, Smita	3:49
7.	"Love Me Now"	Sukhwinder Singh	4:11
Total length:			28:32

== Reception ==
Chandu was released on 31 August 2001 but received a poor response from both audiences and critics, failing to make an impact at the box office.

Telugucinema.com in its review remarked that the film featured one good song and described Pavan Kumar (Jeet) as "a one-day wonder."

=== Impact on Jeet's career ===
The commercial failure of Chandu posed challenges for the lead actor Jeet (credited as Pavan Kumar), who later described this phase as a low point in his career. The film's lacklustre performance led him to question his prospects in the film industry, prompting a brief hiatus during which he reevaluated his aspirations and approach to acting.

Following his experience with Chandu, Jeet redirected his efforts toward the Bengali film industry. He achieved a major breakthrough in 2002 with the Bengali film Sathi, which became a commercial success and garnered him critical acclaim. Jeet later credited the failure of Chandu as a pivotal learning experience that helped him build resilience and confidence. Over time, he emerged as one of the most prominent and highest-paid actors in Bengali cinema.
