= Partner (2008 film) =

- Poster
- Directed by: Shankar Ray
- Written by: Manotosh Ray
- Produced by: Sukumar Bhadra
- Starring: Jeet; Swastika Mukherjee; Arpita Mukherjee
- Cinematography: K R Ramesh
- Music by: Ashok Raj
- Release date: 25 July 2008
- Country: India
- Language: Bengali

Partner (Bengali: পার্টনার) is a Bengali-language black comedy drama film directed by Shankar Ray. The film stars Jeet, Swastika Mukherjee and Arpita Mukherjee in the lead roles.

== Plot ==
Partner is all about a funny and dangerous contract between two haggards Dasu and Ayan. The two met at the Sealdah North Railway Tracks while arriving for suicide at the same time. While Dasu realising his faults, Ayan remains bent on ending his life. Dasu is a rich man turned poor (after his only son's death) who is constantly truncated by debtors while Ayan is a frustrated rich brat who is devastated after crushing in his business (share and stocks) and being betrayed by his girlfriend Rina.

Dasu convinces Ayan not to commit suicide at the heat of the moment when Ayan still insists to die Dasu sorts out a peculiar contract between themselves. He begs Ayan to die exactly after three months. This is because Dasu, who is a part-time insurance agent, wants Ayan to buy a life insurance policy which would mature after three months.

Dasu, meanwhile would pay the premium of 10 thousand rupees by any means whatsoever and after three months when Ayan would commit suicide Dasu would get the entire value of the insurance policy (Rs. 10 lacs) as Ayan's only nominee. Ayan evaluates Dasu's proposal and thinks to make some penance for his sins before his death. Ayan starts living in Dasu's residence for the next three months. Meanwhile, Ayan falls in love with Dasu's only daughter Priya and Ayan's father Ramen Roy appoints his brother-in-law Gobordhan Ghoshal as a private investigator to find his missing son. After much fun, frolic and confusion, Ayan is barred by Dasu from committing suicide. Dasu's debts are cleared by the hearty Romen Roy while Ayan marries Priya.

== Cast ==
- Jeet as Ayan Roy
- Swastika Mukherjee as Priya Bhattacharya
- Arpita Mukherjee as Rina
- Santu Mukhopadhyay as Dasu Bhattacharya
- Deepankar De as Ramen Roy
- Anamika Saha as Mrs. Roy
- Kharaj Mukherjee as Gobardhan Ghosal
- Kanchan Mullick as Keshta
- Nimu Bhowmik as Moni Jyotishi
- Sharmistha Nath

== Soundtrack ==
The music of the album has been composed as well as written by Ashok Raj.

Track listing
No.	Title	Singer(s)	Length
1.	"Aami Raat Pari"	Shaan & Alka Yagnik	TBA
2.	"Aai Mon Je Fagin"	Shaan	4:42
3.	"Pak Pak Pakat"	Rima & Satyaranjan	4:13
4.	"Halla Gulla Chardin"	Kumar Sanu & Anuradha Paudwal	4:05
5.	"Aajke Khusir Ei"	Jeniva & Suman	3:20
6.	"Aaj Ei Aktu Kache"	Javed Ali & Alka Yagnik	TBA
