= Boomerang (2024 Indian film) =

2024 Indian Bengali sci-fi comedy film

- Theatrical release poster
- Directed by: Sauvik Kundu
- Based on: Punoray Ruby Ray by Lokkrishti
- Screenplay by: Sugata Sinha; Sauvik Kundu; Salim
- Dialogues by: Jeet Satragni; Sugata Sinha; Souvik Kundu
- Story by: Jeet Satragni
- Produced by: Jeet; Gopal Madnani; Amit Jumrani
- Starring: Jeet; Rukmini Maitra; Sourav Das; Rajatava Dutta; Kharaj Mukherjee; Ambarish Bhattacharya; Debchandrima Singha Roy; Shyamal Chakraborty; Jhulan Bhattacharya
- Narrated by: Rajatava Dutta
- Cinematography: Manas Ganguly
- Edited by: Sujay Dutta Roy
- Music by: Songs: Nilayan Chaterjee; Background score: Sanjoy Salil Chowdhury
- Production companies: Grassroot Entertainment; Jeetz Filmworks
- Distributed by: Grassroot Entertainment
- Release date: 7 June 2024
- Running time: 135 minutes
- Country: India
- Language: Bengali

Boomerang (/buːməræŋ/) is a 2024 Indian Bengali-language science fiction comedy-drama film co-written and directed by Sauvik Kundu. Produced by Jeet, Gopal Madnani and Amit Jumrani under the banner of Jeetz Filmworks and Grassroot Entertainment, it stars Jeet himself and Rukmini Maitra in the lead, both portraying dual roles alongside an ensemble cast of Sourav Das, Rajatava Dutta, Kharaj Mukherjee, Ambarish Bhattacharya, Shyamal Chakraborty, Jhulan Bhattacharya, Ayesha Bhattacharya and Debchandrima Singha Roy, with Biswanath Basu in a special appearance.

Based on Lokkrishti's famous stage production Punoray Ruby Ray, a play written by Jeet Satragni, the film revolves around Samar Sen, a scientist with a brilliant mind, who builds a humanoid robot and a series of events leads to thrill and comic situations that create a boomerang effect. Announced in November 2022, its principal photography commenced in July 2023. Predominantly shot in Kolkata and Howrah, the filming was wrapped by October 2023. Nilayan Chaterjee composed the soundtrack of the film, also penning the lyrics, while Sanjoy Salil Chowdhury provided its background score. The cinematography and editing of the film are handled by Manas Ganguly and Sujay Dutta Roy respectively. The action sequences are choreographed by Ravi Verma, while dance and VFX were served by Bosco-Caesar and Nikhil Koduru respectively, while the latter makes his debut in Bengali cinema.

Boomerang was theatrically released on 7 June 2024 to positive reviews from critics and audiences alike.

== Plot ==
Scientist Samar Sen, inventor of the "Flying Bike" and "Virtual Mobile" is a scientist of high intellect and mettle. Despite repeated failures, he dreamt of making a humanoid robot. Although he was married to Isha, her father tried to fix her marriage again with a groom of his choice because Samar didn't have a stable job. But, riding high on hopes, with meticulous precision he created an andro-humanoid robot "Nisha", very similar to his wife Isha. In the meantime, Nisha decides to take a break from Samar and he on the other hand, fell prey to Chinese goons, who were in the intention of stealing Isha from him for various malpractices against the country. When Nisha enters in the main scene, it became a boomerang for him and created confusion and chaos.

== Cast ==
- Jeet in a dual role as
  - Samar Sen, a genius scientist
  - Amar, an andro-humanoid clone robot
- Rukmini Maitra in dual role as
  - Isha Sen (née Manna), Samar's Wife
  - Nisha, an andro-humanoid clone robot
- Saurav Das as Ayan, Samar's co-scientist and best friend
- Shyamal Chakraborty as Samar's father
- Rajatava Dutta as Isha's father
- Kharaj Mukherjee as Chang Lee, a Chinese agent working for Chinese terrorists in Kolkata
- Biswanath Basu as Isha's maternal uncle
- Ambarish Bhattacharya as Samar's neighbour
- Syed Arefin
- Debchandrima Singha Roy as Tina, Ayan's girlfriend
- Nanak Madnani as Inspector S Bose
- Ayesha Bhattacharya as Baishakhi
- Uday Shankar Paul as a servant

== Production ==
=== Announcement ===
The film was announced by Jeet via his Twitter handle on 30 November 2022 on the occasion of his birthday. The film's first look was unveiled on the occasion of Eid on 11 April 2024. The poster sparked anticipation among the fans, especially with the pairing of Jeet and Rukmini Maitra on screen for the first time.

=== Development ===
Cinebot

The production of Boomerang marked a significant technological advancement in the Bengali film industry with the introduction of the Cine-Bot technology for the first time in any Bengali film.

Superbike

Alongside the cinebot technology, Boomerang also features a custom-designed futuristic superbike, which plays an integral role in the narrative. First time in any Bengali film, the cutting-edge two-wheeler will showcase never seen before technology in Tollywood.

== Soundtrack ==
Boomerang

Soundtrack album by Nilayan Chatterjee
- Released: 2024
- Recorded: 2023–24
- Genre: Film soundtrack
- Languages: Bengali; Hindi
- Labels: Grassroot Entertainment (Bengali); Grassroot Music (Hindi)

The music of the film is composed by Nilayan Chatterjee while Sanjoy Salil Chowdhury composed the background score. The lyrics have been penned by Nilayan Chatterjee and Prashant Ingole.

The first single "Boomerang Title Track" was released on 6 May 2024. The Hindi version with the same title was released on 28 May 2024. The second single "Adwitiya" was released on 14 May 2024. The Hindi version titled "O Bairiya" was released on 1 June 2024. The third single titled "Bon Bon" was released on 2 June 2024. The Hindi version with the same title was released on 7 June 2024.

=== Bengali ===
Track listing
No.	Title	Lyrics	Singer(s)	Length
1.	"Boomerang Title Track"	Nilayan Chatterjee	Shashwat Singh, Kartick Das Baul, Shyamoshree Saha	3:20
2.	"Adwitiya"	Nilayan Chatterjee	Sonu Nigam	2:41
3.	"Bon Bon"	Nilayan Chatterjee	Nakash Aziz	3:14
Total length:				9:15

=== Hindi ===
Track listing
No.	Title	Lyrics	Singer(s)	Length
1.	"Boomerang Title Track"	Nilayan Chatterjee	Shashwat Singh, Romy, Shyamoshree Saha	3:10
2.	"O Bairiya"	Prashant Ingole	Sonu Nigam	2:39
3.	"Bon Bon"	Nilayan Chatterjee	Nakash Aziz	3:11
Total length:				9:00

== Marketing ==
Unique promotional strategies were undertaken to align with the futuristic sci-fi theme of the movie. On 13 April Rukmini Maitra informed via her Instagram that her Facebook profile has been hacked. Jeet also extended help to resolve this issue. Later they informed it was a part of the film promotions. On 22 May 2024, a bald look of Rukmini was released, which created chaos and surprise among the netizens.

The teaser of the film was dropped on 14 April 2024. The 2nd poster of the film was dropped on 20 May 2024. The trailer was released on 24 May 2024 at an event at Star Theatre in North Kolkata.

== Release ==
Initially set to release on 10 May 2024, the film's release was postponed and released on 7 June 2024 due to the concurrent 2024 Lok Sabha elections scheduled in May.

== Reception ==
=== Critical reception ===
Suparna Majumder of Sangbad Pratidin reviewed the film on a positive note and wrote "It was nice to experience Jeet in a comedic role instead of the larger-than-life massy roles. It proved his abilities as an actor. The witty dialogues and comedic scenes throughout will make the audience laugh throughout the length of the movie." Shamayita Chakraborty of OTTplay rated the film 3 out of 5 stars and termed it as "Laughter riot. Despite a sluggish start, it is a perfect two-odd-hour to shut the worries of real life and focus on the screen." The film was averagely rated 6.5/10 by Tanmoy Ghosh of BFR, who praised its storyline, dialogues and the VFX. He also added "All through out the film there are comedy elements which are working favourably for the film. And you will never feel that those moments are forced. Punchlines which are usey to bring out this comical effect, are simply fantastic. We can easily divide this film into two halves - the first half is based on comedy genre but the second half is replete with emotion."

Agnivo Niyogi of The Telegraph reviewed the film and noted "Science-fiction films are hard to come by in Bengali cinema, sci-fi comedies even more so. The one who has taken on the challenge to deliver one is Jeet, whose film has him switching gears and playing a scientist instead of an action hero. While he does well in a comedic role, it is Rukmini Maitra who shines in the double performance, setting Isha and Nisha apart through her body language, diction and mannerisms. Her chemistry with Jeet is easy on the eye too." He also mentioned the catchy lines separately used in the script for the characters played by Kharaj Mukherjee and Ambarish Bhattacharya. Poorna Banerjee of Times of India rated the film 3.5 out of 5 stars and wrote "It is a wholesome, hilarious film with well placed comic timing, literary quips and rhyming lines that will keep the audience engaged throughout its length." She also praised the CGI, performance of the whole cast, specially Rukmini as a robot and also mentioned that it was refreshing to watch Jeet in a comedic role. Souvik Saha of Cine Kolkata rated the film 3.5 out of 5 stars and wrote "Boomerang is a comedic sci-fi gem that offers a laughter-filled journey, anchored by stellar performances, witty dialogue, and engaging direction." He praised the performance of the cast, Jeet's charismatic acting, dialogues, comedy, direction and cinematography but criticized the VFX.

Deboleena Ghosh of Ei Samay rated the film 3.5 out of 5 stars and wrote "The film successfully engages the audience through its apt comedy, dialogues and funny scenarios." She praised Sourav in his role, the music of the film, Jeet's seamless performance, Rukmini's performance as the robot and the chemistry between them. Deborshi Bandyopadhyay of the Anandabazar Patrika reviewed the film on a mixed note and wrote "In this movie, Jeet transformed himself in a layman instead of a superstar. The parent's role throughout the movie is also very well written and emoted by the actors." He praised the performance of the whole cast and specially mentioned the banter between Jeet and Sourav. But he criticized the lack of emotion in the robotic character played by Rukmini.

Subhasmita Kanji of Hindustan Times rated the film 3.7 out of 5 stars and quoted "Without Jeet, Boomerang might not have had the same magnetism as it does but since the star is on screen, flicking his shades and throwing lighters in the air, it’s a whole different story. Besides, it's too difficult for Rukmini to play Nisha. The humour of the film drives it, whether it is political or dark somewhere." The film was given a rate of 4.5/5 stars by a reviewer of Aaj Tak, who also stated that "Boomerang is carefully written for the theatre audience who should ideally whistle or hoot during the key moments of the film or simply attempt to complete the punch dialogues during the calculated pauses to fully elevate its entertainment value. The play on which its core plot is based, is itself an innovative show of brilliance. Jeet is always the best in his method acting, while his chemistry with Kharaj Mukherjee and Biswanath Basu in the comic sequences, is always top-notch since Awara." Bangla Jago reviewed the film and quoted "An ambitious sci-fi comedy that plays to the gallery and lives up to the hype. Far-fetched in writing but high on star power and style. At its best with superlative performances, Boomerang thrilling and clap worthy moments, larger-than-life action sequences, and a never-before-seen avatar of Jeet. At the box office, it will emerge as a blockbuster of epic proportions, setting new records and rewriting existing ones and also will remain as one of the best works of Jeet."
