= Game (2014 film) =

2014 Indian Bengali film by Baba Yadav

- Theatrical release poster
- Directed by: Baba Yadav
- Screenplay by: N.K. Salil
- Story by: AR Murugadoss
- Starring: Jeet; Subhashree Ganguly; Saurav Chakraborty
- Cinematography: P. Shelva Kumar
- Edited by: MD Kalam
- Music by: Songs: Jeet Gannguli; Score: Harris Jayaraj (unc.) (re-used from Thuppakki)
- Production companies: Reliance Entertainment; Grassroot Entertainment Pvt. Ltd
- Distributed by: Reliance Entertainment; Grassroot Entertainment Pvt. Ltd
- Release date: 30 May 2014
- Running time: 161 minutes
- Country: India
- Language: Bengali
- Box office: ₹8.95 crore

Game is a 2014 Indian Bengali-language action thriller film directed by Baba Yadav and produced and distributed by Reliance Entertainment and Grassroot Entertainment Pvt. Ltd. The film features actors Jeet, Subhashree Ganguly and Saurav Chakraborty in the lead roles. Songs for the film has been composed by Jeet Gannguli. The film is a remake of the 2012 Tamil film Thuppakki.

== Plot ==
Abhimanyu Chatterjee, a captain in the Indian Army, returns to Kolkata from Kashmir on vacation. On his arrival, his parents and younger sisters force him to see Trisha, who they choose for him to be married to. At the bride-viewing ceremony, Abhimanyu makes up excuses to avoid marrying her, which includes commenting about her being old-fashioned. On the contrary, Trisha is a college-level boxer and has a modern outlook. Abhimanyu realises this and proposes to her, which she reciprocates.

One day, while travelling around the city with his police officer-friend Santilal, Abhimanyu witnesses the explosion of a bus in which they had travelled. He manages to capture an injured man who planted the bomb, but he escapes from the hospital where he was kept under custody. He kidnaps the bomber again, and also forces the police officer who helped in the bomber's escape, to commit suicide. Abhimanyu soon learns that the bomber is a mere executor, a sleeper cell, whose only role was to plant the bomb. He also discovers that the Islamic terrorist group Harkat-ul-Jihad al-Islami, which the bomber belongs to, has planned various such attacks in the city in a couple of days. Enlisting the help of his fellow Army men and Shantilal, Abhimanyu manages to thwart these attacks and kill the sleeper cell leader's brother and eleven other terrorists, including the first sleeper cell.

When the leader of the terrorist group learns about the role of Abhimanyu in the failure of the terrorist attack, he begins to target the families of the army men, except Abhimanyu, by kidnapping someone close to them. When Abhimanyu realises the plan, he substitutes one of the people to be kidnapped, with his younger sister . Using his pet dog and his sister's Dupatta, he manages to reach the terrorists' hideout, rescuing his sister, who was about to be killed after Abhimanyu's bluff was exposed, and the other victims and eliminating the terrorists assembled there. Asif Ali, the second-in-command of the sleeper cells, is captured and killed by Abhimanyu.

When this attack fails, the terrorist leader decides to target Abhimanyu himself. He asks Abhimanyu to surrender to him or else there would be more terrorist attacks. Abhimanyu decides to sacrifice his life and devises a plan with his fellow army men. Ahimanyu meets the leader in a ship, which has been rigged with a bomb planted by Abhimanyu's friend. When he learns about the leader's plan, however, which is to expose Abhimanyu's army team as terrorists and knowing about a Muslim terrorist in the Indian defense — Vinod Sharma, he fights the leader and escapes with him in a boat. After the ship explodes, he kills the leader. Abhimanyu confronts Vinod Sharma and forces him to commit suicide, and later returns to Kashmir with his team.

== Cast ==
- Jeet as Abhimanyu Chatterjee, captain in DIA, a wing of Indian Army.
- Subhashree Ganguly as Trisha, a boxer.
- Sudipto Balav as Inspector Shantilal, Abhimanyu's best friend.
- Saurav Chakraborty as the sleeper cell's leader, who plans 12 bomb blasts in Kolkata
- Shankar Chakraborty as Dibakar Panda, Abhimanyu's senior commanding officer.
- Arindam Sil as Vinod Sharma, DIA Secretary.
- Biswajit Chakraborty as Abhimanyu's father
- Moushumi Saha as Abhimanyu's mother
- Subhashish Mukherjee as Trisha's father
- Arindol Bagchi as ACP Raghav Sen
- Angshuman Pratyush as Abhimanyu's friend in the Army who is part of the team that kills the terrorists
- Gourab Roy Chowdhury as Abhimanyu's friend in the Army who is part of the team that kills the terrorists
- Somnath Kar as Abhimanyu's friend in the Army who is part of the team that kills the terrorists
- Vascar Dev as Abhimanyu's friend in the Army who is part of the team that kills the terrorists
- Yusuf Chishti as Abhimanyu's friend in the Army who is part of the team that kills the terrorists.

== Production ==
Jeet's role is that of an army officer for which he exercised for one-and-a-half months to prepare for the role. The film was shot in Kolkata and the title song was shot in Bolpur. The songs "Bum Chiki Chikni Chiki" and "Ore Manwa Re" were shot in Dubai. For the latter song, Jeet and Subhashree Ganguly shot on top of a 45-story building.

== Soundtrack ==
The songs were composed by Jeet Gannguli. In an audio review for The Times of India, Sutapa Singha rated the album 2/5 stars and wrote, "You know that phrase -it's quality, not quantity, that matters? Well, Game, with just four tracks, could have focused a little more on the quality factor. Alas, it fails in both respects". The critic also criticised the use of Hindi lyrics at the beginning of each song.

Game

Soundtrack album by Jeet Gannguli
- Released: 23 May 2014
- Recorded: 2014
- Genre: Feature film soundtrack
- Language: Bengali
- Label: T-Series
- Producer: Reliance Entertainment

Jeet Gannguli chronology
Chirodini Tumi Je Amar 2 (2014)	Game (2014)	Arundhati (2014)

Singles from Game
- 1. "Bum Chiki Chikni Chiki" Released: 10 Apr 2014; 2. "Game (Title Track)" Released: 24 Apr 2014; 3. "Ore Manwa Re" Released: 8 May 2014; 4. "Party All Night" Released: 20 May 2014

No.	Title	Lyrics	Singer(s)	Length
1.	"Game (Title Track)"	Raja Chanda	Javed Ali	3:49
2.	"Bum Chiki Chikni Chiki"	Raja Chanda	Nakash Aziz, Akriti Kakkar	3:47
3.	"Ore Manwa Re"	Prasen (Prasenjit Mukherjee)	Arijit Singh, Akriti Kakkar	4:38
4.	"Party All Night"	Raja Chanda	Benny Dayal, Neeti Mohan	3:30
Total length:				15:44

== Reception ==
The film received mixed reviews from the critics. A critic from The Times of India gave 3.5 stars out of 5 and wrote "Game is an intelligent movie, with a lot of firepower and mindless fun. It's the kind of movie that doesn't, for a minute, make you regret why you bought that ticket. Give us a believable plot and we're game. And that's what Game is — believable, though your belief gets a bit stretched at times. But what else can you expect from a commercial masala flick? It has the right dose of romance, comedy, action and incredulity to make it big at the box office. The script is crisp, thanks to its Tamil film industry origins, and the pace is engaging." Shoma A. Chatterjee of The Indian Express, wrote "There is a raw energy that drives the film towards it predictable climax. The ‘sister-kidnapping’ strategy as a process of blackmail could have been replaced with something more logical, intelligent and credible because terrorists generally keep away from kidnaps specially of girls because it renders them susceptible to greater media exposure and therefore identification".

== Box office ==
The film collected 4.95 crore at the box office. The film also became the superhit.

== See also ==
- Thuppakki
