= Raju Uncle =

- Theatrical release poster
- Directed by: Haranath Chakraborty
- Written by: Monotosh Chakraborty
- Screenplay by: Monotosh Chakraborty
- Story by: Monotosh Chakraborty
- Produced by: Pijush Saha
- Starring: Prosenjit Chatterjee; Sayantani Ghosh; Ranjit Mallick; Rajesh Sharma; Kanchan Mullick; Arun Banerjee; Anamika Saha
- Edited by: Swapan Guha
- Music by: Ashok Raj
- Production company: Prince Entertainment P4
- Distributed by: Eskay Movies
- Release date: 29 July 2005
- Country: India
- Language: Bengali

Raju Uncle is a 2005 Bengali action comedy film directed by Haranath Chakraborty and produced by Pijush Saha. The film features actors Prosenjit Chatterjee and Sayantani Ghosh in the lead roles. Music for the film was composed by Ashok Raj.

== Plot ==
Raju, a young teacher lives with a group of orphans at his mortgaged house. Raju is honest but poor, he always searches for a job and finally finds that of detective.

== Cast ==
- Prosenjit Chatterjee as Raju/ Raju Uncle
- Sayantani Ghosh as Neela, Raju's love interest
- Ranjit Mallick as Ranjit Mallick, Head of Detective Agency
- Rajesh Sharma as Dilip Roy
- Kanchan Mullick as Keshto
- Monu Mukhopadhyay as Mukherjee Babu
- Arun Banerjee as Suren Roy, Manager
- Anamika Saha as Neelima (Neela's Step-Mother)
- Dolon Roy as Mala, Keshto's love interest
- Nimu Bhowmik as Autodriver, Mala's father
- Nilabhra Sett as Student of J.K School (child role)

== Soundtrack ==
Raju Uncle (2005) Songs
Songs	Singers
"Raat Name Du Chokhe"	Sonu Nigam
"Shopner Deshete"	Sonu Nigam
"Amra Sobai Raja"	Babul Supriyo, Deep Mala
"Ektu Chena Ektu Jana"	Roop Kumar Rathod, Shreya Ghoshal
"Mon Mane Na"	Shaan, Shreya Ghoshal
"Mar Mar Janta"	Amit Kumar
