= Jeet (actor) =

Indian film actor (born 1978)

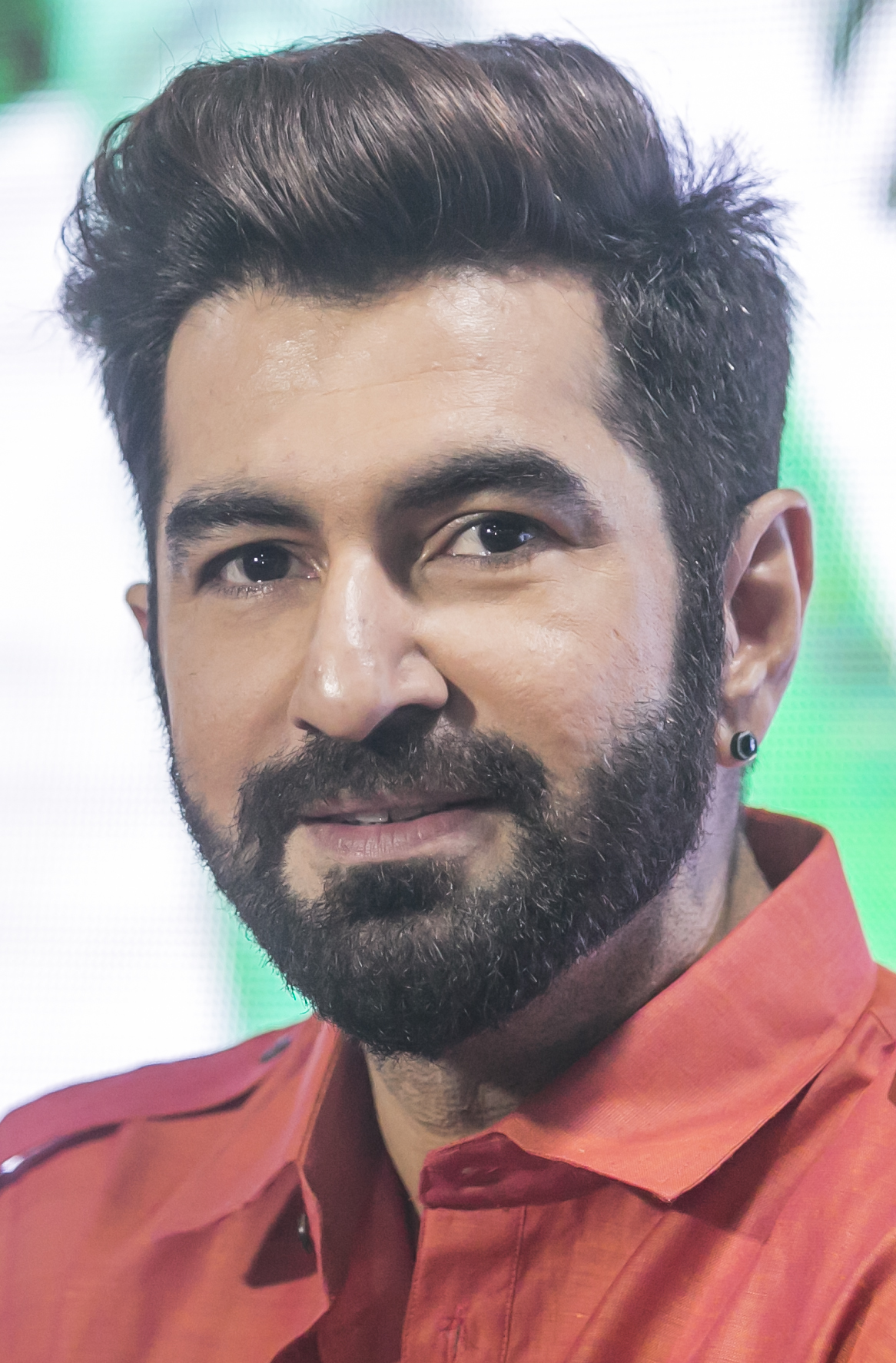
- Jeet in 2017
- Born: Jeetendra Madnani; 30 November 1978 (age 47); Kalighat, Kolkata, West Bengal, India
- Other name: Jeetu Pavan Kumar
- Education: Bhawanipur Education Society College
- Occupations: Actor; model; producer; entrepreneur
- Years active: 1994–present
- Works: Full list
- Spouse: Mohna Ratlani (m. 2011)
- Children: 2
- Awards: Full list
- Website: jeetonline.com

Signature
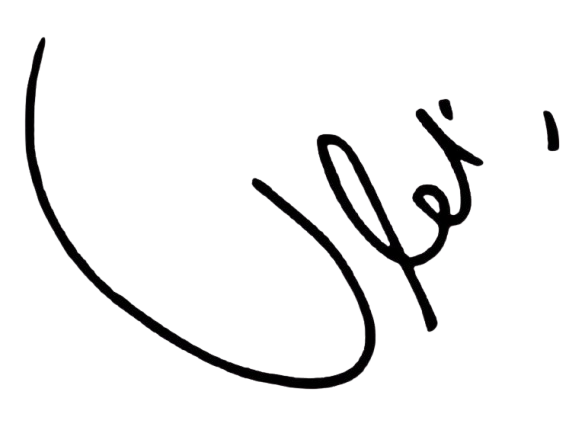

Jeetendra Madnani (born 30 November 1978), mononymously known as Jeet, is an Indian actor and film producer who works in Bengali cinema. In a career spanning over two decades, Jeet has acted in 57 films Since Chandu and is one of the most commercially successful actors in Bengali cinema, also being amongst the highest paid actors in West Bengal, India. Referred to in the media as the Boss, he owns the production houses Grassroot Entertainment and Jeetz Filmworks. Since 2022, he is the executive president of West Bengal Motion Picture Artists' Forum.

His first acting assignment was opposite Sudipta Chakraborty in Bishnu Palchoudhuri's Hindi TV series Vish Briksha (1994) which was based on Bankim Chandra Chatterjee's celebrated Bengali novel Bishabriksha. After a string of roles in television, he made his big screen debut with Chandu (2001) which was a commercial failure. He was catapulted to stardom after he portrayed the lead in Sathi (2002) which became one of the highest grossing Bengali films of all time.

In a career spanning over two decades, he has become one of the highest paid and biggest stars of Bengali cinema throughout the years, receiving both critical acclaim and commercial success. Some of his commercially successful ventures includes Nater Guru (2003), Sangee (2003), Shubhodrishti (2005), Jor (2008), Dui Prithibi (2010), Josh (2010), Awara (2012), Fighter (2012), Boss: Born to Rule (2013), Deewana (2013), Bachchan (2014), Game (2014), Badsha – The Don (2016), Boss 2: Back to Rule (2017), Raavan (2022), Chengiz (2023) and Boomerang (2024). Chengiz became the first Bengali film to get a simultaneous Hindi release, and was a commercial success.

He debuted as a producer in 2012 with his film 100% Love, which became a box-office success. He has also been a recipient of numerous awards including Tele Cine Awards, Anandalok Puraskar for the Best Actor, BFJA Awards (2003), Filmfare Awards East (2014), Bengali Film & Television Award (2023, 2024), Zee 24 Ghanta Ananya Samman (2024), Kalakar Awards (2014) for "King of Tollywood", and TV9 Bangla Ghorer Bioscope Awards for Contributions to the Bengali Film Industry.

== Personal life ==
Jeet was born into a Sindhi family. He had reportedly been in a relationship with his co-star Swastika Mukherjee during the shooting of the film Mastan.

Jeet subsequently married Mohna Ratlani, a school teacher from Lucknow, India, on 24 February 2011. On 12 December 2012, they became parents to a daughter, Navanya Madnani. On 16 October 2023, Jeet and Mohna welcomed their second child, a son they named Ronav Madnani.

== Career ==
=== 1993–1997: Foray into television ===
Inspired by Uttam Kumar and Amitabh Bachchan in his childhood, Jeet began his career with modelling assignments and several ad films. In 1994, he starred in an advertisement of Nawab ganji under the production of Doordarshan Bangla. This gave him the opportunity to star opposite Sudipta Chakraborty in Bishnu Pal Chowdhury's television series Bish Briksha (1994–95), based on the 1873 novel of the same name by Bankim Chandra Chattopadhyay. His portrayal of Taracharan in the series led to his further appearances including as Anil in Janani (1995) under the production of Doordarshan Bangla. In this timespace, he also played minor parts in the serials including Bhabna (1995) and Sei Raate Raat Chhilo (1994–95). His appearances in these serials led critics to compare his look and acting style with those of Soumitra Chatterjee, while Jeet had denied this fact claiming it to be a rumour. In 1995, he assisted Tapan Sinha in his Hindi anthology film Daughters of This Century, in which he also starred in two of the film's segments – Kadambini starring Shabana Azmi and Champiya starring Deepa Sahi.

Jeet changed his decision to act in films in November 1996. He moved from Kolkata to Mumbai along with his friend Nirmal to pursue a full-time career in Bollywood. He used to stay in a housing co-operative society named "Saathi" in Andheri, where he met a cinematographer named Arif. On the latter's suggestion, Jeet started to feature in several music videos including "Kuchh Kuchh" and "Bewafa Tera Masoom Chehra" from the respective albums Loriyaan and Bewafa Tera Masoom Chehra in 1997. The same year, he played a small role of a police officer in B. P. Singh's horror thriller series Aahat in a segment named Raaz, and also made a cameo appearance in Jai Hanuman (1997). During this time, Jeet appeared with Kim Sharma in a Pepsi commercial featuring Shah Rukh Khan. He was cast as the protagonist in a film named Suraj Dhalne Ke Baad, which was never released.

In early 1998, Jeet returned to Kolkata being disappointed and began assisting Tapan Sinha in his horror comedy Ajab Gayer Ajab Kotha (1998). By this time, he started doing theatres in Proscenium Art Centre and got appraisals for his performances in the George Bernard Shaw written plays Arms and The Man and Man at The Floor. His time with the theatre company shaped his craft and kindled his attraction to makeup.

=== 2001–2004: Debut as a lead actor and beginning with tragic characters ===
In December 2000, Jeet auditioned for a bilingual film titled Chandu; it was to be shot simultaneously in Telugu and Hindi, while was filmed in the former language later. Credited as Pavan Kumar in the film, Jeet made his feature film debut as well as debut in Telugu cinema, which was a box office failure. The film's lacklustre performance led him to question his prospects in the film industry, prompting a brief hiatus during which he reevaluated his aspirations and approach to acting. He made his foray into Bengali cinema through the musical romance Sathi the next year, alongside Priyanka Upendra. An adaptation of the 1931 Charlie Chaplin film City Lights, the film had Jeet playing the role of an aspiring singer who is desperate to restore the sights of his love interest. With global revenues of ₹10.19 crore (US$1.1 million), Sathi emerged as the highest-grossing Bengali film of 2002 and one of the highest-grossing Bengali films of all time. Jeet's performance was acclaimed by critics; he received Most Promising Actor and Best Actor awards at the BFJA Awards and Anandalok Puraskar respectively. The film established him as a prominent actor in Bengali cinema. The actor found life hard after his overnight success, particularly the demands on his time.

Following the success of Sathi, Jeet garnered the most appreciation for portraying tragic roles in two box office hits: a one-sided lover in Sangee (2003), and a footballer who is responsible for his best friend as well as an ex-footballer's disability in Premi (2004), which is an adaptation of Moti Nandi's 1991 novel Aparajita Ananda. In the latter, he shared screen with Jisshu Sengupta and the debutante Chandana Sharma and it also marked Jeet Gannguli's debut as a composer, with whom Jeet collaborated multiple times later. His another release was Nater Guru (2003), based on a story by Samaresh Basu, in his third collaboration with Haranath Chakraborty. It was the first of many appearances of Jeet with Koel Mallick, who made her debut with the film. Jeet's performance as a struggling lyricist in Shakti (2004) co-starring Raima Sen, conferred him with the Best Actor award in the Bangla Sangeet Chalacchitra Samman in 2005.

In 2004, Jeet starred in a Bengali and Odia bilingual film Mastan co-starring Swastika Mukherjee, in his first of the frequent collaborations with its director Ravi Kinnagi. In his final release of the year, he portrayed a widower father in Kinnagi's family drama Bandhan, co-starring Koel Mallick. The writer Janine Martin has referred to the picture as the blockbuster of the 2000s, a "pot-pourri of romance, songs, and entertainment." Jeet won the Best Actor award at the BFJA Awards, although he and several critics believed his performance to have been overshadowed by that of Mallick. Running for over 40 weeks in theatres, Bandhan gave a new name to the pair of Jeet and Mallick, which is "JeKo", known by the initials of their names.

The roles in this phase of his career, and the series of romantic tragedies and family dramas that followed, earned Jeet widespread adulation from audiences, and according to the author Bhaswati Ghosh, established him as an icon of tragedy in West Bengal. He continued to have frequent professional associations with Shrikant Mohta, Nispal Singh and Kinnagi, who moulded his image and made him into a superstar. Jeet became a romantic leading man without ever actually kissing any of his co-stars, and also gained a huge popularity for featuring songs lend by Sonu Nigam, Shaan and Babul Supriyo.

=== 2005–2008: Critical and commercial success ===
In 2005, he acted in Yuddho along with Mithun Chakraborty, Debashree Roy and Koel Mallick. That same year, Jeet collaborated with Mallick in Shubhodrishti and Manik, both directed by Prabhat Roy. Jeet won the Anandalok Awards for Best Actor for Manik.

Jeet again acted with Mallick in two consecutive films – Ghatak and Hero. He played Govindlal in Raja Sen's directional venture Krishnakanter Will, which starred Swastika Mukherjee and Monali Thakur as female leads. His next film was with Hrishitaa Bhatt, titled Bidhatar Lekha, which starred Priyanshu Chatterjee as the main antagonist. The film explores two lovers and their relationship in their last life that had come to a tragic end, and the pair confronts each other again in the current incarnation. He again collaborated with Mukherjee for the film Partner in 2008. Jeet collaborated with Varsha Priyadarshini for Jor which, made on a budget ₹1.25 crore, crossed seven weeks in theater and proved to be a hit at the box office.

=== 2009–2017: Further success ===
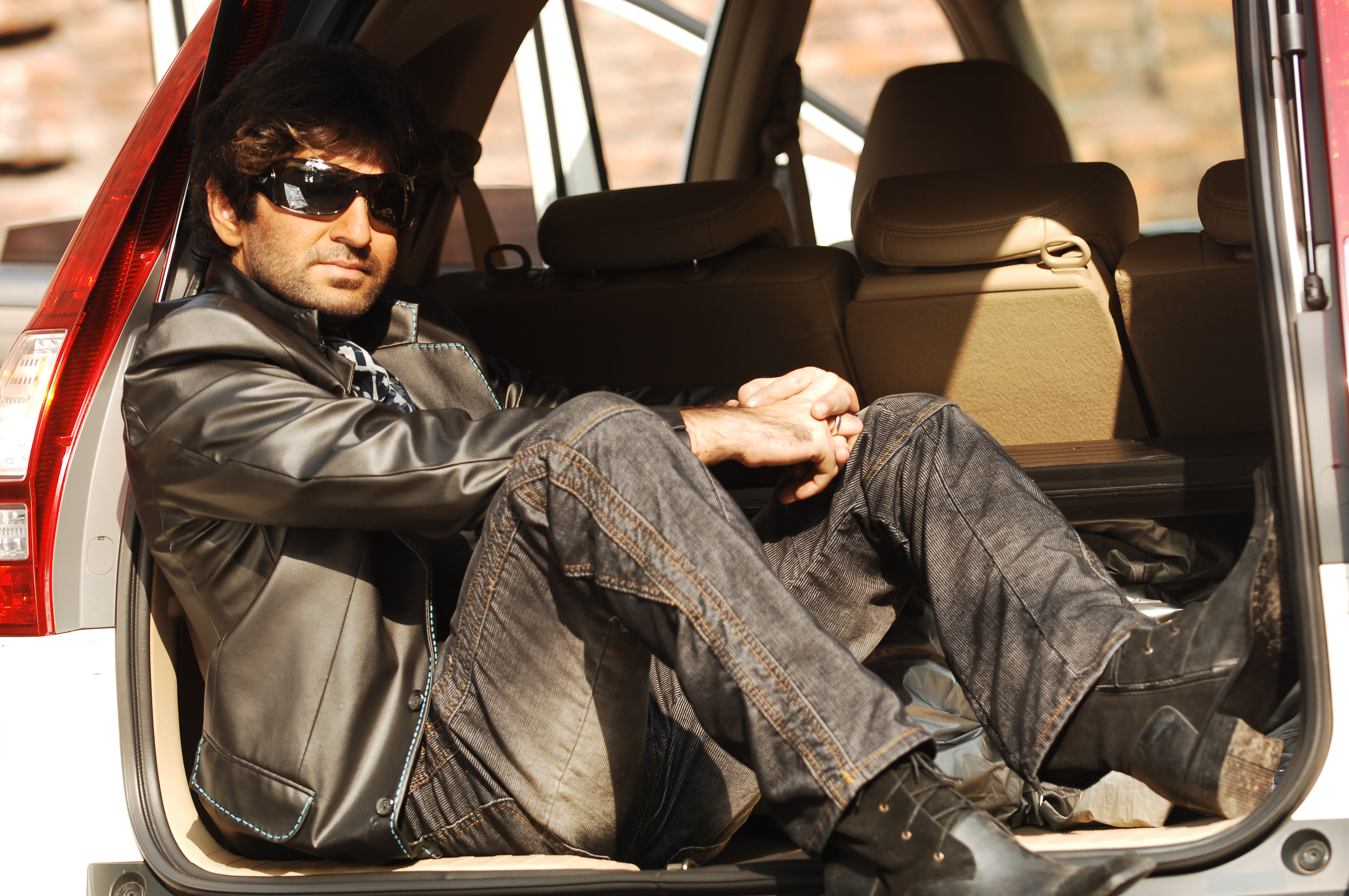
Jeet during a film shoot in 2009

Jeet appeared with Mallick in the films Saat Paake Bandha and Neel Akasher Chandni. He starred in Dui Prithibi, which was released on 14 October 2010. Dui Prithibi was the highest grosser of 2010, according to a study conducted by FICCI and Deloitte.

Jeet next starred with Srabanti Chatterjee in Fighter, the remake of the Telugu film Lakshyam. He worked with Nusrat Jahan in Raj Chakraborty's action film Shotru, which was a remake of the Tamil film Singam. Roshni Mukherjee of The Times of India gave the film a positive review. Jeet reappeared with Priyanka Trivedi in Hello Memsaheb. In 2012 he became a producer with the movie 100% Love, in which he also acted together with Mallick. His second film in 2012 with Sayantika Banerjee was Awara, which was the highest-grossing film of the year 2012. In 2013, he appeared in the gangster action film Boss with Subhashree Ganguly which was a remake of Mahesh Babu's Businessman. Although the film received mixed reviews from critics, Jaya Biswas of The Times of India wrote that "Jeet [...] can dance, fight and emote as well." Jeet won the Kalakar Awards for The King of Tollywood for the film. He was also nominated for Best Actor in the inaugural ceremony of Filmfare Awards East.

Jeet acted in an extended special performance with Abir Chatterjee and Shraddha Das in Neeraj Pandey's debut Bengali production venture The Royal Bengal Tiger. Produced by Friday Filmworks and Jeet's Grassroot Entertainment and distributed by Viacom 18 Motion Pictures, the film turned out to be a critical and commercial success. Jeet's performance of a suave and slightly dangerous Anjan who completely transforms the main protagonist in the film, received critical acclaim. He also acted in Baba Yadav's second directional venture Game, in which he played an officer of the Defence Intelligence Agency (DIA) working in the Indian Army. In 2014, Jeet co-starred with Aindrita Ray (in her debut Bengali film) in the film Bachchan, which was released on 3 October 2014, to positive response from critics as well as from audiences.

In 2015 he co-starred in the action comedy film Besh Korechi Prem Korechi with Koel Mallick. The film included Kharaj Mukherjee, Puneet Issar and Ashish Vidyarthi in lead roles. It was a remake of the Telugu movie Loukyam. In 2016, he starred in Power and Badsha – The Don. Directed by Baba Yadav, Badsha – The Don was an Indian-Bangladeshi action comedy film. Both films failed at the box office. He also played the lead role in Abhimaan. 2017 onwards all his films have been released under the banner of his own production houses "Grassroot Entertainment" and "Jeetz Filmworks". In 2017 he starred in Boss 2: Back to Rule, a sequel to his 2013 film Boss: Born to Rule. Jeet reprised his role of Surya aka Surya Bhai. An India-Bangladesh joint production directed by Baba Yadav, it features Subhashree Ganguly and Bangladeshi actress Nusraat Faria in the leading roles. It went on to become the fourth highest grossing Bengali film of all time grossing more than 10.5 crores.

=== 2018–2021: Career fluctuations ===
In 2018, first he released Inspector Notty K. It failed at the box office and received negative reviews from the critics. Then he played the titular role in Sultan: The Saviour which is a remake of 2015 Tamil movie Vedalam. It was commercial success. His third film that year was Bagh Bandi Khela. In 2019, he first acted in the comedy-drama Baccha Shoshur. Then he co-starred in Shesh Theke Shuru with Koel Mallick. It was the 50th movie of Jeet since his first movie Chandu (2001) and it marked the collaboration between Jeet and Koel Mallick after four years since they last worked altogether in 2015 film Besh Korechi Prem Korechi. His third film in 2019 was Panther: Hindustan Meri Jaan. An action thriller directed by debutant Anshuman Pratyush, although majority of the audiences appreciated it, critics gave it overwhelmingly negative reviews. In 2020, Jeet starred in the critically acclaimed Asur directed by Pavel Bhattacharjee. It was a tribute to the sculptor Ramkinkar Baij. In 2021, he starred in Baazi, a film made under his production house Jeetz Filmworks, opposite Mimi Chakraborty. It was released in October during Puja holidays and became a box office failure.

=== 2022–present: Comeback and commercial expansion ===
In 2022, he starred in Ravaan, a film made under his production house Jeetz Filmworks. It released on Eid al-Fitr. The film received moderate reviews and became successful at the box office. While Jeet's performance received praise, the plot and screenplay was criticised. In 2023, he starred in the action-thriller Chengiz which became the first Bengali film to be released simultaneously in both Bengali and Hindi languages on 21 April 2023. It received a superhit verdict and became the highest grossing Bengali film of 2023. His second film in 2023 was Manush: Child of Destiny with Jeetu Kamal, Sushmita Chatterjee and Bidya Sinha Saha Mim. It was also released in Hindi besides Bengali and performed average at the box office.

His next venture was Boomerang, which released on 7 June 2024 after it was postponed due to the 2024 General Elections. The first sci-fi comedy film of Bengal, the film received positive reviews from the critics and audience alike. In 2025, he made his web series debut in the Netflix series Khakee: The Bengal Chapter created by Neeraj Pandey. It also marked his Hindi debut and earned him multiple OTT awards.

== Other works ==
=== Brand endorsements ===
A relatively small budget ad of a regional brand of men's underwear had Jeet in the lead. He became the brand ambassador of Fashion at Big Bazaar (a unit of Future Group) on 18 September 2013. In 2005, a special Durga Puja campaign of Thums Up launched Jeet as their brand ambassador in West Bengal. Jeet launched the Times Food Guide 2012 in Kolkata.

=== Sports ventures ===
Jeet was also the ex-captain of the Bengal Tigers in the Celebrity Cricket League. Jeet had also acquired the Kolkata franchise of the first-ever multi-nation 2016 Premier Futsal season that started on 15 July 2016. The team is known as "Kolkata 5s" as each franchise was similarly named in the inaugural season.
