= Mastan =

Indian Bengali language film

- Poster
- Directed by: Rabi Kinagi
- Written by: Rabi Kinagi
- Produced by: Surinder Films
- Starring: Jeet; Swastika Mukherjee
- Music by: Monmatho Mishra
- Release date: 22 October 2004
- Running time: 166 minutes
- Country: India
- Language: Bengali

Mastan is a 2004 Indian Bengali-language action thriller film directed by Ravi Kinnagi. The film stars Jeet, Swastika Mukherjee in her debut, Hara Patnaik and Mihir Das. Inspired by Clint Eastwood's 1993 film A Perfect World, it was dubbed as Suna Sankhali in Odia.

== Plot ==
The film revolves around the life of Raju, a poor boy whose mother dies of starvation. He is taken under the fold by the local smuggler named Bhanupratap. He grows up to become an antisocial and an associate of the smuggler. However, he decides to sever ties with the underworld after he falls in love with Mamata. But his past becomes a barrier as Mamata's father learns of their relationship. Ultimately Mamata is forced to marry Avinash, a CBI officer after her father suffers a heart attack. This transforms Raju into a ruthless criminal. Meanwhile, Avinash, the husband of Mamata, comes to town. He disrupts and puts a stop to Bhanupratap's smuggling business and he sends Raju to kill him. But Raju confronts Mamata who begs him to spare Avinash's life. Raju asks them to leave the city. The train Mamata was travelling gets involved in an accident. They lose their child. Raju leaves the underworld (as he could not kill Avinash) and finds the child.

== Cast ==
- Jeet as Raja aka Babu Qamar
- Swastika Mukherjee as Mamata
- Varsha Priyadarshini as Puja
- Mihir Das as Abhinash Chowdhury
- Debu Bose as Debendra (Mamata's father)
- Hara Patnaik as Bhanu Pratap

== Soundtrack ==
Singers are Babul Supriyo, Shreya Ghoshal.

All lyrics are written by Gautam Susmit.

Track listing
No.	Title	Lyrics	Music	Length
1.	"Tor Hasite Ami Hasi"	Gautam Susmit	Monmatho Mishra	05:41
2.	"Tomake Na Jodi Dekhi"	Gautam Susmit	Monmatho Mishra	04:07
3.	"Sono Sabhi"	Gautam Susmit	Monmatho Mishra
4.	"O Daradi Tui Jas Na Chole"	Gautam Susmit	Monmatho Mishra	07:25
5.	"Amar Swapner Raja"	Gautam Susmit	Monmatho Mishra
6.	"Maa O Maa Kabe Aasbe"	Gautam Susmit	Monmatho Mishra

== Reception ==
The film received mixed reviews from the critics but positive reviews from the audience. It emerged as a commercial success.
