= Sangee (2003 film) =

- The poster for the film Sangee
- Directed by: Haranath Chakraborty
- Written by: Monotosh Chakraborty (Screenplay & Dialogues)
- Story by: Ravichandran
- Produced by: Shree Venkatesh Films
- Starring: Jeet; Priyanka Trivedi; Ranjit Mallick; Silajit
- Cinematography: V. Prabhakar
- Edited by: Swapan Guha
- Music by: S. P. Venkatesh
- Distributed by: Sinjini Movies (P) Ltd.
- Release date: 26 December 2003
- Running time: 148 minutes
- Country: India
- Language: Bengali
- Budget: ₹1 crore

Sangee (lit. 'Companion') is a 2003 Indian Bengali-language romantic drama film directed by Haranath Chakraborty. Featuring Jeet and Priyanka Trivedi in their second film together, Silajit Majumder plays a crucial role in the film. The film is a remake of the Tamil film Kannedhirey Thondrinal (1998).

== Plot ==
Bijay, the son of a prominent businessman from Siliguri, comes to Calcutta for his higher studies. At the Bidhannagar Road railway station, he has a chance of meeting with Rupa. Bijay experiences what is termed as "love at first sight" according to his mentor and maternal uncle, Prabhu Mama. Despite getting off on the wrong foot with a student, Rana, at his college, they become close friends after Bijay helps Rana fight off some goons. Although Bijay comes from an affluent background, he is very down-to-earth, a fact that Rana appreciates.

Bijay pursues Rupa, unaware of the fact that Rupa is Rana's younger sister. An initially disinterested Rupa gradually falls in love with him too. However, upon hearing from Rana how a friend of his had betrayed him in the past- by eloping with his other sister on the day of her wedding- Bijay sacrifices his love for his friendship with Rana, fearing that Rana would think of his relationship with Rupa as a betrayal too. Rupa, on the other hand, is unwilling to let go. Unable to change Bijay's mind, she watches helplessly as her family arranges for her wedding. Desperate, she consumes poison and is taken to the hospital, where all is revealed. Rana is touched by his friend's sacrifice and asks Bijay to accept his sister's hand in marriage.

== Cast ==
- Jeet as Bijay
- Ranjit Mallick as Prabhu mama
- Priyanka Trivedi as Rupa
- Silajit Majumder as Rana
- Anamika Saha as Rana & Rupa's Mother
- Kanchan Mullick as Bijay & Rana's Friend
- Sudip Mukherjee as Dipak
- Sumitra Mukherjee
- Sanghamitra Bandyopadhyay
- Rajesh Sharma
- Amarnath Mukhopadhyay
- Ramen Raychowdhury
- Pushpita Mukherjee
- Babul Supriyo as himself (Guest)

== Soundtrack ==
Sangee

Soundtrack album by S. P. Venkatesh
- Released: 14 June 2003
- Recorded: 2003
- Genre: Feature film soundtrack
- Length: 29:30
- Language: Bengali
- Producer: Sinjini Movies (P) Ltd.

S. P. Venkatesh chronology
Sathi (2002)	Sangee (2003)	Nater Guru (2003)

The album was composed by S. P. Venkatesh for Sangee. The lyrics have been written by Gautam Sushmit. Mano, Anuradha Sreeram, Kavita Krishnamurthy and Babul Supriyo have given their voices for the album.

Track listing
No.	Title	Lyrics	Music	Singer(s)	Length
1.	"Alto Chhoyate"	Gautam Susmit	S. P. Venkatesh	Mano, Anuradha Sriram	05:01
2.	"Bombay Kapiye"	Gautam Susmit	S. P. Venkatesh	Babul Supriyo	05:09
3.	"Hok Na Se Abhinoy"	Gautam Susmit	S. P. Venkatesh	Kavita Krishnamurthy	03:27
4.	"Jodi Mathay Ghomta"	Gautam Susmit	S. P. Venkatesh	Anuradha Sriram, Mano	04:56
5.	"Kere Nili (Happy)"	Gautam Susmit	S. P. Venkatesh	Mano, Babul Supriyo	04:53
6.	"Kere Nili (Sad)"	Gautam Susmit	S. P. Venkatesh	Mano	00:38
7.	"Sahoshay Bharosay"	Gautam Susmit	S. P. Venkatesh	Mano, Anuradha Sriram	05:10
Total length:					29:30
