= Abhimaan (2016 film) =

2016 film directed by Raj Chakraborty

- Theatrical release poster
- Directed by: Raj Chakraborty
- Produced by: Reliance Entertainment; Grassroot Entertainment; Walzen Media Works
- Starring: Jeet; Subhashree Ganguly; Sayantika Banerjee
- Music by: Suddho Roy
- Production companies: Grassroot Entertainment; Reliance Entertainment; Walzen Media Works
- Release date: 6 October 2016 (India)
- Running time: 132 minutes
- Country: India
- Language: Bengali

Abhimaan (transl. self respect/ego) is a 2016 Indian Bengali-language action drama film directed by Raj Chakraborty and starring Jeet, Subhashree Ganguly and Sayantika Banerjee. The movie was released in India on 6 October 2016 and in Bangladesh on 30 December 2016.

== Synopsis ==
Abhimaan is the story of a proud Italian-Bengali business tycoon Ashok Deb Burman and his estranged daughter Madhuja. Madhuja harbours hate for her father — who disowned her because she married someone from a lower society against his wishes. Twenty five years pass and mellowed with age, Ashok now wants to mend his relationship with Madhuja. For this, he seeks the help of his grandson, Aditya Deb Burman. The rest of the story follows Aditya's leaving Italy and arriving at Kolkata, entering the house posing as a driver and how he gets into many adventures and misadventures and finally succeeds in reconciling his grandfather with his aunt.

== Cast ==
- Jeet as Aditya Deb Burman/ Adi / Dip
- Subhashree Ganguly as Dishani
- Sayantika Banerjee as Srijani
- Sabyasachi Chakrabarty as Ashok Deb Burman, Aditya's grandfather, Madhuja's father
- Kaushik Banerjee as Arun Deb Burman, Aditya's father
- Anjana Basu as Madhuja Banerjee, Aditya's paternal aunt
- Animesh Bhaduri as Pranab Banerjee, Madhuja's husband, Aditya's paternal uncle
- Biswanath Basu as Khashnobish, Aditya's assistant
- Kanchan Mullick as Shivok
- Kharaj Mukherjee as Bheegu, Madhuja's manager
- Sudip Mukherjee as Yudhisthir Sardar
- Supriyo Dutta as Mr. Thanthaniya
- Swastika Dutta as Ishani
- Buddhadeb Bhattacharjee as Central Home Minister
- Esha Bhattacharjee as Choto Ma
- Yusuf Chishti as a director in Ashok Deb Burman's company

== Soundtrack ==
Abhimaan

Soundtrack album by Suddho Roy
- Released: 2016
- Recorded: 2016
- Genre: Feature film soundtrack
- Length: 16:13
- Language: Bengali
- Labels: Grassroot Entertainment; Reliance Entertainment; Walzen Media Works

Track listing
No.	Title	Lyrics	Singer(s)	Length
1.	"Saiyaan"	Prasen	Sonu Nigam	4:12
2.	"Mon Bechara"	Prasen	Shaan, Shweta Pandit	3:58
3.	"Selfie"	Raja Chanda	Nakash Aziz, Jolly Das	3:44
4.	"Maan Abhimaan"	Priyo Chatterjee	Amit Mishra	4:19
Total length:				16:13
