= Kanchan Mullick =

Indian politician and film actor

- Kanchan Mullick in an interview in 2017

Member of the West Bengal Legislative Assembly
- In office 2 May 2021 – 4 May 2026
- Preceded by: Prabir Kumar Ghosal
- Succeeded by: Dipanjan Chakraborty
- Constituency: Uttarpara

Personal details
- Born: 6 May 1970 (age 56) West Bengal, India
- Party: Trinamool Congress (2021-present)
- Spouses: Anindita Das; Pinky Banerjee; Sreemoyee Chattoraj
- Children: 3
- Occupation: Actor, Politician

Kanchan Mullick is an Indian Bengali film and television actor and politician. In addition to the television show Janata Express, Kanchan has also acted in movies like Mahakaal and Ranjana Ami Ar Ashbona. He is also a Bengali theatre artist. He has worked in the theatre group Swapnasandhani. Mullick was a MLA from the Uttarpara constituency. He had won the seat as an Trinamool Congress candidate in the 2021 West Bengal Legislative Assembly election.

== Filmography ==
- Sathi (2002)
- Sangee (2003)
- Nater Guru (2003)
- Patal Ghar (2003)
- Alo (2003)
- Sangram (2005)
- Raju Uncle (2005)
- Sakal Sandhya (2005)
- Hero (2006)
- Shikar (2006)
- No Problem (2007) - Unreleased
- Mahakaal (2008)
- Janmadata (2008)
- Bor Asbe Ekhuni (2008)
- 10:10 (2008)
- Tomar Jonyo (2008)
- Lakshyabhed (2009)
- Jor Jar Muluk Tar (2010)
- Bye Bye Bangkok (2011)
- Jiyo Kaka (2011)
- Janala (2011)
- Ranjana Ami Ar Ashbona (2011)
- Tomake Chai (2011)
- Hello Memsaheb (2011)
- Gosainbaganer Bhoot (2011)
- Goraay Gondogol (2012)
- Behalf bass Off Route E (2012)
- Bhallu Sardar (2012)
- Bangal Ghoti Phataphati (2012)
- Kanchenjunga Express (2012)
- Bawali Unlimited (2012)
- Golemale Pirit Koro Na (2013)
- Khiladi (2013)
- Window Connections (2014)
- Bachchan (2014)
- Yoddha (2014)
- Shorts (2013)
- Shudhu Tomari Jonyo (2015)
- Rajkahini (2015)
- Jenana (2016)
- Kelor Kirti (2016)
- Love Express (2016)
- Zulfiqar (2016)
- Ko 2 (2016) (Tamil film)
- Dhruva (2016) (Telugu film)
- Abhimaan (2016)
- Byomkesh O Chiriyakhana (2016)
- Haripad Bandwala (2016)
- Curzoner Kalom (2017)
- Upendra Matte Baa (2017) (Kannada film)
- Dhananjay (2017)
- Nimki Fulki (2017)
- Purnimar Chand (2018)
- Dharasnan (2020)
- Sultan: The Saviour (2018)
- Shankar Mudi (2019)
- Jaanbaaz (2019)
- Mahalaya (2019)
- Teko (2019)
- Sagardwipey Jawker Dhan (2019)
- Panther: Hindustan Meri Jaan (2019)
- Tiki-Taka (2020)
- Dracula Sir (2020)
- Hullor (2020)
- Cholo Potol Tuli (2020)
- Bob Biswas (2021)
- Bony (2021)
- Tonic (2021)
- Raktabeej (2023)
- Tenida and Co. (2023)
- Kurban (2023)
- Pradhan (2023)
- Saralakkha Holmes (2024)
- Shastri (2024)
- Bhool Bhulaiyaa 3 (2024) (Hindi film)
- Shotyi Bole Shotyi Kichhu Nei (2025)
- Aamar Boss (2025)
- Raktabeej 2 (2025)
- Bhanupriya Bhooter Hotel (2026)
- Phonybabu Viral (2026)
- Keu Bole Biplobi Keu Bole Dakat (2026)
- Emperor vs Sarat Chandra (2026)

== Television ==
- Sansar Sukher Hoy Romonir Guney (Star Jalsha)
- Grihoprobesh (Star Jalsha)

== Web series ==
Year	Series	OTT	Character	Ref.
2016	Selfier Phande	ZEE5	Tushar Mohanty	
2019	Montu Pilot	Hoichoi	Taufik	
2019	Sharate Aaj	ZEE5		
2021	Mouchaak	Hoichoi	Tarak Panda	
2022	Hostel Days	Hoichoi	Tinku da	
2024	Nikosh Chhaya	Hoichoi	Bhanu Tantrik	
2026	Nikosh Chhaya 2	Hoichoi	Bhanu Tantrik	

== Controversy ==
Mullick married Sreemoyee Chattoraj on 14 February 2024, but during the traditional ceremony on 6 March, an invitation card was widely circulated to social media that press, security personnel and drivers were not allowed to enter there. This was highly criticised in the media. Later Mullick apologized to all.

== See also ==
- Kaushik Sen, Bengali actor
- Swapnasandhani, Bengali theatre group
