= Panther: Hindustan Meri Jaan =

2019 Indian Bengali language action thriller film

- Theatrical release poster
- Directed by: Anshuman Pratyush
- Written by: Anshuman Pratyush
- Screenplay by: Anshuman Pratyush; Prameet
- Produced by: Jeet; Gopal Madnani; Amit Jumrani
- Starring: Jeet; Shraddha Das
- Cinematography: Ramyadip Saha
- Edited by: Md. Kalam
- Music by: Savvy; Suddho Roy; Amit-Ishan
- Production company: Jeetz Filmworks
- Distributed by: Grassroot Entertainment
- Release date: 9 August 2019
- Country: India
- Language: Bengali

Panther: Hindustan Meri Jaan is a 2019 Indian Bengali-language spy action-thriller film directed by debutant Anshuman Pratyush while story, screenplay and dialogues were written by Anshuman Pratyush and Prameet and co-written by Jeet . The film features Jeet and Shraddha Das in the lead roles.

== Cast ==
- Jeet as Panther, a highly trained RAW agent considered one of the agency's best
- Shraddha Das as Zia, daughter of Jahangir, a dance teacher in a school of Kolkata
- Saswata Chatterjee as Spyder, a RAW agent who handles technical aspects
- Sourav Chakraborty as Afzal Faridi, Deputy Chief of Fictional Terrorist Group Isbul Al-Qaeda
- Shantilal Mukherjee as Jahangir/Firoz Khan
- Sudip Mukherjee as Francis D'Costa, RAW personnel
- Rupanjana Mitra as Defence Ministry personnel, a very close person to the Prime Minister
- Kanchan Mallick as Jhumjhum, a RAW agent based in Tehrikistan
- Biswarup Biswas as Yakub Habibi, Isbul Al-Qaeda Chief
- Pradip Dhar as Moulana Salim Reza, a terrorist who disguises himself as an antic shop owner in the Chorabazar area
- Aryann Roy as Aman Hassan, Afzal's henchman
- Neil Chatterjee as Samir Hassan, Aman's younger brother
- Unknown Female as UAE immigration officer Sahida, Zia's Friend
- Roman Khan as Sahida's Husband

== Release ==
The film released on 9 August 2019.

== Soundtrack ==
Panther: Hindustan Meri Jaan

Soundtrack album by Savvy, Suddho Roy, Amit–Ishan
- Released: 4 August 2019
- Recorded: 2019
- Studio: DB Junction, Kolkata
- Genre: Feature film soundtrack
- Length: 16:15
- Language: Bengali
- Label: Grassroot Entertainment

Singles from Panther: Hindustan Meri Jaan
- 1. "Vande Mataram" Released: 26 Jul 2019; 2. "Marhaba" Released: 31 Jul 2019

The soundtrack is composed by Savvy, Suddho Roy, Amit–Ishan and lyrics by Bankim Chandra Chatterjee, Ritam Sen and Suddho Roy.

Track listing
No.	Title	Lyrics	Music	Singer	Length
1.	"Vande Mataram" (Back vocal: Ikkshita Mukherjee, Ishan Mitra and Shovon)	Bankim Chandra Chatterjee, Suddho Roy, Ritam Sen	Suddho Roy	Krishna Beura, Suddho Roy	3:25
2.	"Marhaba"	Ritam Sen	Amit-Ishan	Abhay Jodhpurkar, Nikhita Gandhi, Shovon Ganguly	4:12
3.	"Udashi Shon"	Ritam Sen	Savvy	Ishan Mitra	4:06
4.	"Vande Mataram"	Bankim Chandra Chattopadhyay, Suddho Roy, Ritam Sen	Suddho Roy	Sukhwinder Singh	4:32
Total length:					16:15
