= Arun Bannerjee =

Indian actor

- অরুণ ব্যানার্জী
- Occupation: Actor
- Known for: Sati (1989); Macho Mustanaa (2012); Naach Nagini Naach Re (1996)

Arun Bannerjee (Bengali: অরুণ ব্যানার্জী, Hindi: अरुण बनर्जी) is an Indian Bengali film actor.

== Filmography ==
=== Actor ===
- Herogiri (2015)
- Bhroon (2013)
- Canvas (2013)
- Jodi Hridoye Lekho Naam (2013)
- Kartiker Biye (2013)
- Surjo - The King (2013)
- Deewana (2013)
- Idiot (2012)
- Challenge 2 (2012)
- Macho Mustanaa (2012)
- Lorai (2011)
- Aami Aachi Sei Je Tomar (2011)
- Apon Shatru (2011)
- Peeriti Kanthaler Aantha (2011)
- Jor Jar Muluk Tar (2010)
- Love Circus (2010)
- Soldier (2010)
- Aahuti (2010)
- Pratidwandi (2010)
- Rajodrohi (2009)
- Dujone (2009)
- Neel Akasher Chandni (2009)
- I Love You (2007)
- Priyotama (2006)
- Raju Uncle (2005)
- Sathi Aamar (2005)
- Surya (2004)
- Mon Jake Chay (2004)
- Sagar Kinare (2004)
- Shakti (2004)
- Deba (2002)
- Tantrik (2002)
- Malabadal (2001)
- Nodir Pare Aamar Bari (2001)
- Debanjali (2000)
- Joy Maa Durga (2000)
- Parichay (2000)
- Swashurbari Zindabad (2000)
- Jugabatar Loknath (1999)
- Jamaibabu (1996)

== Television ==
- Binni Dhaner Khoi
- Sholoana
- Tapur Tupur
- Joyee
- Aalta Phoring
- Tomader Rani
