= Baazi (2021 film) =

2021 Indian Bengali-language action film

- Teaser poster
- Directed by: Anshuman Pratyush
- Screenplay by: Arnab Bhowmik; Bibhas; Anubhab; Dinesh Bhanji Divani
- Story by: Anshuman Pratyush
- Produced by: Jeet; Gopal Madnani; Amit Jumrani
- Starring: Jeet; Mimi Chakraborty
- Cinematography: Ramyadip Saha
- Edited by: Md. Kalam
- Music by: Jeet Gannguli
- Production companies: Jeetz Filmworks; CAG Studios
- Distributed by: CAG studios
- Release date: 10 October 2021
- Country: India
- Language: Bengali

Baazi (/bɑːzi/; transl. Challenge) is a 2021 Indian Bengali-language action thriller film directed by Anshuman Pratyush and produced by Jeet, Gopal Madnani and Amit Jumrani under the banner of Jeetz Filmworks Pvt. Ltd. It stars Jeet and Mimi Chakraborty. The film was shot in London and the shoot was wrapped up in October 2020. It revolves around a man (Jeet), who vows to take revenge in order to give his father (Abhishek Chatterjee) a new life. The film was to be released on 14 May 2021, but got postponed due to COVID-19 pandemic aftermath. It was released on 10 October 2021 coinciding with Puja holidays.

== Synopsis ==
Baazi is a revenge story, where a son takes revenge for his father. A conman cheats an entrepreneur and takes his wealth. The man is suffering from a terminal disease and wants his son to take revenge for him. The son goes to London to seek revenge on the person, who is now rich and powerful, and befriends his daughter to approach him.

== Cast ==
- Jeet as Aditya Mukherjee
- Mimi Chakraborty as Kyra
- Abhishek Chatterjee as Rudra Pratap Mukherjee, Aditya's father
- Biswanath Basu as Kancha
- Sabyasachi Chakraborty as Krishna Kumar Bardhan, Kyra's father, the main antagonist
- Debdoot Ghosh as Bikram Mukherjee, Aditya's brother
- Somnath Kar as Joy, Krishna Kumar's assistant
- Pradip Dhar
- Nandini Chatterjee
- Nanak Madnani
- Rohan Mitra

== Production ==
Baazi was announced in February 2020, is an official remake of Nannaku Prematho with Jeet and Mimi Chakraborty as leading pair. The first shot of the film was taken in February 2020. The filming in London was suspended in March 2020 due to COVID-19 pandemic and production team returned to India. The filming was resumed on 10 October 2020, after lockdown due to the pandemic.

== Release ==
The film was to release on 14 May 2021, but postponed due to COVID-19 pandemic. The film was released on 10 October 2021 coinciding with Puja holidays.

== Soundtrack ==
Soundtrack of the film is composed by Jeet Gannguli and lyrics penned by Pratik Kundu and Pranjol.

Track listing
No.	Title	Lyrics	Singer(s)	Length
1.	"Aaye Na Kache Re"	Pratik Kundu	Nakash Aziz	3:14
2.	"Tor Bhul Bhangabo Ki Kore Bol"	Pranjol	Jubin Nautiyal	4:16
3.	"Baare Baare"	Pratik Kundu	Dev Negi, Nikhita Gandhi	3:57
4.	"Tor Bhul Bhangabo Ki Kore Bol (Reprise Version)"	Pranjol	Mimi Chakraborty	3:15
Total length:				14:42
