= Shesh Theke Shuru =

2019 Indian Bengali language action drama film

- Official poster
- Directed by: Raj Chakraborty
- Screenplay by: Aditya Sengupta Muqueed Md (Additional Screenplay)
- Story by: Aditya Sengupta
- Produced by: Jeet; Gopal Madnani; Amit Jumrani; Sunny Surani
- Starring: Jeet; Koel; Ritabhari Chakraborty; Sayantika Banerjee; Tridha Choudhury; Sourav Chakraborty
- Narrated by: Koel
- Cinematography: Manas Ganguly
- Edited by: Md. Kalam
- Music by: Arko
- Production companies: Jeetz Filmworks; Rising Film Productions
- Distributed by: Grassroot Entertainment
- Release date: 5 June 2019
- Running time: 140 minutes
- Country: India
- Languages: Bengali

Shesh Theke Shuru (transl. Beginning from the end) is a 2019 Indian Bengali language action crime drama film directed by Raj Chakraborty while story, screenplay and dialogues were written by Aditya Sengupta. The film features Jeet, Koel and Ritabhari Chakraborty in the lead roles. It was shot across London, Dhaka and Kolkata. The movie was adapted from the novel Water & Fire. The film became the 50th acting credit for Jeet.

== Plot ==
A Dhaka-based businessman Mahid Sheikh falls for Pujarini, a charming research scholar from Kolkata but dark secrets from Mahid's past threaten to resurface and shatter their peaceful world.

== Cast ==
- Jeet in dual roles as Mahid Sheikh, a businessman from Dhaka and son of Mahid married to Yasmin (Junior Mahid)
- Koel as Pujarini, who lives in Kolkata
- Ritabhari Chakraborty as Farzana
- Joy Bhowmik as Huzeifa Chacha
- Tridha Choudhury as Yasmin
- Aindrila Sharma as Nadira, Mahid's sister
- Kheyali Dastidar as Mahid's mother
- Saptarshi Maulik as Abdul
- Sayantika Banerjee as item number "Madhubala"(special appearance)
- Somnath Kar as Jewel
- Saurav Chakraborty as Rakib
- Krishno Kishore Mukhopadhyay as Pujarini's father
- Anindita Bose as Pujarini's friend
- Tulika Basu as Pujarini's mother(cameo)

== Development ==
=== Production ===
The director Raj Chakraborty and the leading pair Jeet and Koel are collaborating after 4 years since they last worked together in the 2015 film Besh Korechi Prem Korechi.

== Soundtrack ==
Shesh Theke Shuru

Soundtrack album by Arko
- Released: 2019
- Recorded: 2018
- Studio: Jeetz Filmworks
- Genre: Feature film soundtrack
- Length: 11:43
- Language: Bengali
- Label: Grassroot Entertainment

Singles from Shesh Theke Shuru
- 1. "Mon Aamar" Released: 26 April 2019; 2. "Madhubala" Released: 22 May 2019; 3. "Allah Aamar" Released: 30 May 2019

All lyrics are written by Pranjol.

Track listing
No.	Title	Singer	Length
1.	"Mon Aamar"	Arko	4:07
2.	"Madhubala"	Arko, Akriti Kakar, Tanmoy Saadhak	4:12
3.	"Allah Aamar"	Arko	3:24
Total length:			11:43
