= Manik (2005 film) =

- Film poster
- Directed by: Probhat Roy
- Written by: Prabhat Roy
- Produced by: Pradip Bharadwaj
- Starring: Jeet; Koel
- Cinematography: Premendu Bikash Chaki
- Edited by: Atish Chandra Sarkar
- Music by: Babul Bose
- Distributed by: Ashadeep Entertainment
- Release date: 22 April 2005
- Running time: 166 minutes
- Country: India
- Language: Bengali

Manik (Bengali: মানিক) is a Bengali action drama film released in 2005. It was written and directed by Probhat Roy and chief assistant director was Madhuchhanda Sengupta, the movie featured Jeet, Koel, Ranjit Mallick. This film was shot at Kalimpong Golf Course.

== Plot ==
Samir Mitra is an unemployed educated man who is looking for a job. His father Abir Mitra is retired and his mother is suffering from cancer. One day Samir suddenly meets Manik Chandra Sadhukhan. Manik's father is Niranjan Sadhukan who is also ill. Latika is Manik's younger sister. Manik has come to Kolkata to meet his father's friend Chandrakanta Majumadar who is an established businessman. Manik gets into an accident on the way. Samir tries to save his life. Before his death Manik requests Samir to take care of his father and younger sister; he also tells Samir not to disclose the news of his accident. Manik gives Samir all the required information. Samir becomes Manik; he meets Chandrakanta as Manik. Chandrakanta appoints him in his own office. Samir meets Chandrakanta's daughter Ria and wife Manju. Ria and Samir gradually fall in love but Samir feels uncomfortable whenever he thinks of what would happen when everybody discovers that he is not Manik. From his salary he maintains his own family and Manik's family. Everybody is impressed with his behavior and honesty. Suddenly Niranjan and Latika come to Kolkata because Niranjan is unwell. Niranjan has lost his eyesight and there is a problem in his heart also. Samir tries to hide from Niranjan but everybody learns the truth. Kartik Sen, the business rival of Chandrakanta, kidnaps Ria and demands ransom. Samir and Chandrakanta rescue her with the help of the police. Samir donates his father's eye to Niranjan. Niranjan recovers his eyesight.

== Cast ==
- Jeet as Samir Mitra, who disguised himself as fake Manik
- Koel as Riya Majumdar
- Ranjit Mullick as Chandrakanta Majumdar
- Soma Dey as Manju Majumdar, Riya's mother
- Samata Das as Latika, Manik's sister
- Shyamal Dutta as Niranjan Sadhukhan, Manik's blind father
- Debdut Ghosh as real Manik Chandra Sadhukhan, a poor village boy from Medinipur
- Sagnik Chatterjee as Pratik Sen
- Biplab Chatterjee as Kartik Sen
- Rajatava Dutta as Samir's college friend Anwar, a taxi driver
- Shantilal Mukherjee as Shiben, flat contractor
- Rajesh Sharma as Shambhu, Kartik Sen's henchman
- Monu Mukherjee as Abir Mitra, Samir's father
- Alakananda Ray as Samir's mother

== Soundtrack ==
Manik

Soundtrack album by Babul Bose
- Genre: Feature film soundtrack
- Length: 27:48
- Language: Bengali
- Label: Eskay Music

Official audio
- Manik - Full Album on YouTube

The music for the film has been composed by Babul Bose. All lyrics are written by Gautam Sushmit.

Singers are Babul Supriyo, Shreya Ghoshal, Jojo and Reema Mukherjee.

Track listing
No.	Title	Singer(s)	Length
1.	"Subho Janmodin"	Babul Supriyo	04:11
2.	"Tale Tale Paa"	Jojo	05:30
3.	"Jhumur Jhumur Nopur Baje"	Shreya Ghoshal	04:54
4.	"Tomake Peye Chena Prithibi"	Babul Supriyo, Shreya Ghoshal	04:43
5.	"Ke Dekheche Age"	Babul Supriyo, Shreya Ghoshal	04:31
6.	"Kauke Bhalo Laage"	Babul Supriyo, Shreya Ghoshal, Priya Bhattacharya	04:07
Total length:			27:48

== Awards ==
- Awarded by ETV Lux Best Film in 2005
- Awards :Lux ETV Award as the Best Film in the year 2005. Won five awards.
- Anandalok Awards (2005)
  - Best Actor: Jeet
  - Best Playback Singer (Female) :Shreya Ghoshal
