= Raavan (2022 film) =

2022 Indian Bengali action-thriller film

- Theatrical release poster
- Directed by: MN Raj
- Screenplay by: MN Raj; Arnab Bhaumik; Anubhab
- Dialogues by: Arnab Bhaumik Anubhab
- Story by: MN Raj
- Based on: Ramayana
- Produced by: Jeet; Gopal Madnani; Amit Jumrani
- Starring: Jeet; Lahoma Bhattacharya; Tanusree Chakraborty
- Cinematography: Manas Ganguly
- Edited by: Md Kalam
- Music by: Savvy, The Red Kettle
- Production companies: Jeetz Filmworks; CAG Studios
- Distributed by: Grassroot Entertainment
- Release date: 29 April 2022
- Running time: 138 minutes
- Country: India
- Language: Bengali
- Budget: ₹3.50 Cr
- Box office: ₹4 Cr

Raavan (/rɑːvən/) is a 2022 Indian Bengali-language vigilante action thriller film written and directed by MN Raj marking his directorial debut and produced by Jeet, Gopal Madnani and Amit Jumrani under the banner of Jeetz Filmworks. It stars Jeet in the titular role alongside, Lahoma Bhattacharya (in her debut), Tanusree Chakraborty, Shataf Figar, Kharaj Mukherjee and Biswanath Basu in the lead roles. The film is partially adapted from the Indian epic Ramayana.

The soundtrack of the film was composed by Savvy, The Red Kettle while the background score was by Anbu Selvan.The action sequences were designed by Ravi Varma, with dance choreographed by Imran Sardhariya.

Raavan was theatrically released on April 29, 2022 during the festive season of Eid.

== Plot ==
The plot revolves around several gruesome murders that took place in Kolkata, like that of the editor of a newspaper, a corrupt MLA involved in women trafficking and an industrialist, all of them credited to be involved in corruption. The format of these crimes are considered to be none other than serial killing, as all of them were done by a killer named Raavan. On the other hand, the assigned lady police officer Sumaiyaa Jahan investigates the case and suspects a Professor Ram Mukherjee to be the killer as he resembles Raavan.

== Cast ==
- Jeet as
  - Ram Mukherjee, A College Professor.
  - Raavan, A notorious killer
- Lahoma Bhattacharya as Rai, Ram's student-turned-lover
- Tanusree Chakraborty as ACP Sumaiya Jahan
- Biswanath Basu as Inspector Chayan Pandey
- Shataf Figar as Joint Commissioner Rajiv Sharma
- Alok Jain as Gangster Om Damani
- Rana Mitra as MLA Amar Chowdhury
- Jack Bhattacharya as Sudhir Dutta, Chief Editor of Bhorer Kagaj
- Kharaj Mukherjee as Vinod Ghoshal, college vice principal
- Subhadra Mukherjee as Sushoma, Vinod's wife
- Arindam Ganguly as Ram's father
- Swagata Basu as Ram's mother
- Rohit Mukherjee as Police Commissioner Subrata Sen
- Bhavna Banerjee as Ena, Call girl
- Somnath Kar as Khalid Aslam
- Subhasish Ganguly as College Principle
- Nanak Madnani as ACP Younus Khan
- Buddhadeb Bhattacharya as ACP Dibyendu Sinha Roy

== Production ==
Announcement

After Baazi (2021), Jeet's next film was reported to be another action-thriller directed by a debutant. The film was announced under the title 'Raavan' with a first look poster on Dussera.

== Soundtrack ==
Raavan

Soundtrack album by SavvyThe Red Kettle (you are my love )
- Released: 2022
- Genre: Film soundtrack
- Length: 16:47
- Language: Bengali
- Label: Grassroot Entertainment
External videos
- "Keu Jaane Naa" on YouTube
- "You Are My Love" on YouTube
- "Ami Tor" on YouTube

Singles from Raavan
- 1. "Keu Jaane Naa" Released: 1 April 2022; 2. "You Are My Love" Released: 14 April 2022; 3. "Ami Tor" Released: 21 April 2022

The music of the film is composed by Savvy The Red Kettle with lyrics written by Prosen, Budhaditya Mukherjee and Ritam Sen.

Track listing
No.	Title	Singer(s)	Length
1.	"Keu Jaane Naa"	Arijit Singh	4:39
2.	"You Are My Love"	Ash King	3:58
3.	"Ami Tor"	Javed Ali; Antara Mitra	3:31
4.	"Keu Jaane Naa (Reprised Version)"	Yasser Desai	4:39
Total length:			16:47

== Reception ==
Shamayita.Chakraborty of The Times of India reviewed the film and gave it 3 out of 5 stars and wrote "Such brutality is not often seen in the Bengali film spectrum. Raavan is for those who love action and have an appetite for violence. Jeet as Raavan will not let them down." Sangbad Pratidin and Ei Samay both rated the film 3.5 stars out of 5.
