= Jor (film) =

2008 Indian Bengali action thriller film

- Movie poster
- Directed by: Swapan Saha
- Written by: Manjil Banerjee (Screenplay/Dialogues)
- Produced by: Mukul Sarkar
- Starring: Jeet; Varsha Priyadarshini; Deepankar De
- Edited by: Suresh Urs
- Music by: S. P. Venkatesh
- Distributed by: T. Sarkar Productions; Surinder Films
- Release date: 18 January 2008
- Running time: 141 minutes
- Country: India
- Language: Bengali
- Budget: 1.25 crore

Jor (transl. Force) is a 2008 Indian Bengali-language action film directed by Swapan Saha. The movie features Jeet and Barsa Priyadarshini. It was the first Bengali film of Oriya film actress Barsa Priyadarshini. It was dubbed into Odia as Juge Juge Mun Tumara. It is a remake of the 2003 Telugu language film Okkadu and 2006 Telugu language film Ashok.

== Plot ==
Surya (Jeet) is a sportsman. He loves to run and win championships in Kolkata but is criticized for being short-tempered by his father. Once on a championship tour, he goes to Siliguri. There he runs into an influential gang leader Indrajit ruling over the entire North Bengal (Subrat Dutta), who forcefully tries to make Sumi (Barsha Priyadarshini) his wife. After some struggle and fights, Surya can escape from Siliguri with Sumi. After coming to his home in Kolkata, Surya hides Sumi from his family members. He attempts to arrange for Sumi's departure to the US where her relatives reside. Indrajit and his goons arrive in Kolkata in search of Sumi. They use their political and social influence on the local police who lock up Surya. Eventually, Surya makes the police officer understand that he loves Sumi and he lets him go since the police officer is an old friend of Surya's father (Deepankar De). Surya arrives to get Sumi back from Indrajit's house. Meanwhile, Indrajit's goons go to Surya's home and kidnap Surya's sister. Surya eventually fights after his father permits him to fight for a good cause. Indrajit dies by his mother during the fight coincidentally.

== Cast ==
- Jeet as Suryakanta Dev Burman aka Surya
- Varsha Priyadarshini as Sumi
- Deepankar De as Arobindo, Surya's father
- Gita Mukherjee as Kamalakamini Dev Burman, Surya's mother
- Mimi Dutta as Tina Dev Burman, Surya's sister
- Subrat Dutta as Indranath Sen, a dreaded gangster of North Bengal
- Anamika Saha as Indranath's mother Mahamaya Sen
- Sumit Ganguly
- Arindol Bagchi as Bihari goon Yadav
- Premjit as Ajay, Surjo's friend
- Shyamol Dutta as Inspector General Nabin Ghosh
- Surajit Sen as Rudra

== Soundtrack ==
Jor

Soundtrack album by S. P. Venkatesh
- Released: 18 Jan 2008
- Recorded: 2007–2008
- Genre: Feature film soundtrack
- Length: 29:38
- Language: Bengali
- Label: Channel B Music

The music and background score of the film is composed by S. P. Venkatesh. Mano, Kavita Krishnamurthy, and V. V. Prasanna gave their voices for the album.

Track listing
No.	Title	Singer(s)	Length
1.	"Akasher Neel Simanai (Female)"	Kavita Krishnamurthy	04:38
2.	"Akasher Neel Simanai (Duet)"	Kavita Krishnamurthy, Mano	04:58
3.	"Turi Mere"	Mano	04:16
4.	"Jonom Jonom (Male)"	V. V. Prasanna	04:15
5.	"Jonom Jonom (Duet)"	V.V. Prasanna, Kavita Krishnamurthy	04:25
6.	"Golaper Moto"	Mano, Kavita Krishnamurthy	04:49
7.	"Akasher Neel Simanai (Sad)"	Mano	02:17
Total length:			: 29:38
