= Awara (film) =

Awara(Vagabond)
- Directed by: Ravi Kinnagi
- Written by: N. K. Salil (additional screenplay); V. V. Vinayak (original screenplay); Siva Akula (story)
- Screenplay by: N.K. Salil (additional); V. V. Vinayak (uncredited)
- Based on: Krishna (2008)
- Produced by: Shree Venkatesh Films
- Starring: Jeet; Sayantika Banerjee; Mukul Dev; Ashish Vidyarthi
- Cinematography: Mohan Verma
- Edited by: Mohammad Kalam
- Music by: Jeet Gannguli
- Production company: Shree Venkatesh Films
- Distributed by: Shree Venkatesh Films
- Release date: 13 July 2012
- Running time: 160 minutes
- Country: India
- Language: Bengali

Awara (transl. Vagabond) is a 2012 Indian Bengali-language action comedy film co-written and directed by Ravi Kinnagi. Produced by Shrikant Mohta under the banner of Shree Venkatesh Films, additional screenplay and the dialogues of the film were written by N. K. Salil. Being a remake of the 2008 Telugu film, Krishna, it stars Jeet, Sayantika Banerjee, Mukul Dev (in his debut in Bengali cinema) and Ashish Vidyarthi in lead roles, while Kharaj Mukherjee, Biswajit Chakraborty, Biswanath Basu, Supriyo Dutta, Tulika Basu, Kamalika Banerjee and Arun Banerjee play another pivotal roles, with Subhasish Mukherjee in a guest appearance. The film is placed List of highest-grossing Bengali films.

== Plot ==
The film is about Surya Narayan (Jeet) who was once a software engineer but quits his job to give it to his poor friend and is unemployed in the city of Cooch Behar. Poulomi (Sayantika Banerjee) is a girl from Kolkata who studies in college and comes to Cooch Behar for her vacation to stay with her elder brother Madan Mohan (Kharaj Mukherjee) and his wife. Surya falls in love with Poulomi at first sight in Ransh Mela and starts chasing her to win her heart and enters the upper portion of their house as tenants with his elder brother, Upendra Narayan (Biswajit Chakraborty) and sister in law (Tulika Basu). In this process Surya will clash with local rowdy Shanatan Panja (Tamal Roychowdhury). Mistaking him to be one tapori, Poulomi hates him first but later on she realizes his true nature . She returns to Kolkata and lives with her older brother (Ashish Vidyarthi), a former builder and now a very powerful rowdy who is very possessive and protective of his sister. Surya follows Poulomi to Kolkata and works his way into their house with the help of Madan Mohan and finally both of them confess their love. There, Surya knows the past of Poulomi and how she is being chased by the notorious and cruel Tony Bharadwaj (Mukul Dev) assisted by his uncle (Supriyo Dutta) for marriage. Surya fights Tony, Poulomi's older brother kills Tony, and Surya marries Poulomi.

== Cast ==
ACTOR	ROLE
Jeet	Surya Narayan/Surya
Sayantika	Poulomi
Mukul Dev	Tony Bharadwaj, who controls all the local MLAs and ministers
Ashish Vidyarthi	Indrajit
Kharaj Mukherjee	Madan Mohan
Kamalika Banerjee	Madan Mohan's wife
Supriyo Dutta	Gunodhar Chakraborty, Tony's uncle
Biswajit Chakraborty	Upendra Narayan
Tulika Bose	Surya's sister-in-law (Upendra's wife)
Biswanath Basu	Surya's friend
Tamal Roy Chowdhury	Sanatan Panja
Subhasish Mukherjee	The man who gives rooms for rent to Surya and Poulami
Mousumi Das	Anu, Prashanta's daughter
Rintu Dey	Bubai; Upendra's son and Surya's Nephew
Rajat Ganguly	Prashanta, Chairman of the Municipal Corporation
Arun Banerjee	Advocate Dulal Thakur

== Soundtrack ==
Awara

Soundtrack album by Jeet Gannguli, Dev Sen
- Released: 13 July 2012
- Recorded: 2012
- Genre: Feature film soundtrack
- Language: Bengali
- Label: SVF
- Producer: Shree Venkatesh Films

Singles from Awara
- 1. "Awara (title track)" Released: 12 Jun 2012; 2. "Porle Mone" Released: 22 Jun 2012; 3. "Moner Radio" Released: 27 Jun 2012; 4. "Phool Koli" Released: 3 Jul 2012; 5. "Sarunsa" Released: 22 August 2012; 6. "Ebar Beshi Hobe Na" Released: 5 September 2012; 7. "Moner Radio (female)" Released: 15 November 2012

Jeet Gannguli chronology
Jaaneman (2012)	Awara (2012)	Paglu 2 (2012)

Dev Sen chronology
Awara (2012)	Deewana (2013)

All music is composed by Jeet Gannguli, Dev Sen.

Track listing
No.	Title	Music	Singer(s)	Length
1.	"Porle Mone"	Jeet Gannguli	Jeet Gannguli	4:29
2.	"Moner Radio"	Jeet Gannguli	Jeet Gannguli, Shilpa Rao	2:50
3.	"Phool Koli"	Dev Sen	Prasenjit Mallick, Dev Sen	3:42
4.	"Awara (Title Track)"	Dev Sen	Prasenjit Mallick, Megha Bhardwaj	4:08
