= Shakti (2004 film) =

2004 film

- Shakti Movie Poster
- Directed by: P. Sambhashiv Rao
- Produced by: G. A. Sheshagiri Rao; Bijoy Khemka
- Starring: Jeet; Raima Sen; Amitava Bhattacharya; Biplab Chatterjee; Shankar Chakraborty; Shankar Chakraborty; Dulal Lahiri; Arun Banerjee; Moumita Gupta; Sonali Chowdhury
- Music by: Chakri
- Release date: 15 March 2004
- Country: India
- Language: Bengali

Shakti (transl. The Power) is a 2004 Bengali film directed by P. Sambhashiv Rao and produced by G. A. Sheshagiri Rao and Bijoy Khemka. The film had music composed by Chakri. It is a remake of 2003 Telugu film Satyam.

== Cast ==
- Jeet as Shakti
- Raima Sen as Manasi
- Amitava Bhattacharya
- Biplab Chatterjee
- Shankar Chakraborty
- Dulal Lahiri
- Arun Bannerjee
- Moumita Gupta
- Parthasarathi Deb
- Sonali Chowdhury

== Soundtrack ==
The album was composed by Chakri for Shakti. He reuses the whole soundtrack & score of Satyam in Shakti.

Track listing
| No. | Title | Music | Length |
|---|---|---|---|
| 1. | "Anurage Anurage Ei" | Chakri |
| 2. | "Bhutta Chhere Gudda Tui" | Chakri |
| 3. | "Hay Gourango Eki Rango" | Chakri |
| 4. | "I Am In Love" | Chakri |
| 5. | "Mon Jodi Byatha Paye" | Chakri |
| 6. | "O Manashi Tomar Jannay Sapna Akechi" | Chakri |
