= Sathi (2002 film) =

2002 Indian Bengali film by Haranath Chakraborty

- VCD cover
- Directed by: Haranath Chakraborty
- Written by: Monotosh Chakraborty (Screenplay & Dialogues)
- Story by: S. Ezhil
- Produced by: Shrikant Mohta; Mahendra Soni
- Starring: Jeet; Priyanka Upendra; Ranjit Mallick; Anamika Saha
- Cinematography: V. Prabhakar
- Edited by: Swapan Guha
- Music by: S. P. Venkatesh
- Distributed by: Shree Venkatesh Films
- Release date: 14 June 2002
- Running time: 136 minutes
- Country: India
- Language: Bengali
- Budget: ₹1.50 crore
- Box office: ₹9.82 crore

Saathi (transl. Partner) is a 2002 Indian Bengali-language musical romantic drama film co-written and directed by Haranath Chakraborty. Produced by Shrikant Mohta and Mahendra Soni under the banner of Shree Venkatesh Films. It stars Jeet, making his debut, Priyanka Upendra and Ranjit Mallick in lead roles. It is a remake of the 1999 Tamil film Thullatha Manamum Thullum.

The soundtrack and background score were composed by S. P. Venkatesh, while V. Prabhakar handled the cinematography and editing was finished by Swapan Guha. The film follows the tragic journey of Bijoy Ray, a struggling singer, who comes to Kolkata to find his love Sonali, being released from jail after five years due to false accusations of carrying firearms. It emerged as the highest grossing Bengali film of 2002 and as of 2026, it stands as the eleventh highest grossing Bengali film of all time.

== Plot ==
Bijoy Ray is an aspiring, talented singer, who resides in a village of Burdwan district. He has a caring and loving mother and a helpful brother Chhottu. He comes to Kolkata on the call of a musical tycoon but when he finally arrives at his home Bijoy is shocked to find his mentor dead. He takes refuge with the alcoholic Keshto da, who has a heart of gold. He architects a group of peers and all of them begin to work for an insurance company.

In the meanwhile, Bijoy views Sonali who stays in the same locality as her grandmother. Sonali peculiarly knows Bijoy. She has never seen him, but when Bijoy chants his numbers, she hears them of utmost interest and becomes his ardent admirer. But whenever Bijoy and Sonali physically meet each other, mishaps occur which makes Sonali misunderstand. Thus Sonali has a different picture of Bijoy in her sub-consciousness. She does not realize that the one she admires is the same person whom she hates.

Things come to a standstill when Bijoy accidentally pushes Sonali from the stairs of her college during a fight with goons and she becomes blind. When Bijoy learns of this, he is shattered. Then begins his series of sacrifices and love, he helps the financially strained Sonali and her grandmother by giving their rent. He brings the duo to their mess when their landlord expels them and finally, he sells the precious ring (Bijoy's mother's gift) to allocate the fees and cost required for Sonali's eye treatment. Even when his mother expires he keeps it a secret to everyone and takes Sonali to the eye surgeon. There he knows that Sonali can regain her eyesight if she undergoes an acute and complex operation. To acquire the cost of ₹50,000, Bijoy secretly wards off to Visakhapatnam with the destiny to sell one of his kidneys. Bijoy sacrifices his passion to become a vocalist and secretly supports Sonali to fulfill her dream of becoming a singer, while Sonali has success in her first stint at the recording studios, Bijoy is arrested as a terrorist on the platform of Vizag railway station. Thus with Bijoy's money, Sonali regains eyesight and becomes a famous singer while Bijoy is sentenced to five years of rigorous imprisonment. The day Bijoy returns after completing his sentence turns out to be the same day Sonali attends her musical concert. Bijoy after arriving at Howrah station eyes the hoardings of having huge cutouts of Sonali. He reaches the spot but when he tries to contact Sonali and explain to her that he is her Bijoy, he is brutally hammered by the security. Keshtoda and Bijoy's friend arrive at the juncture. They explain the truth to Sonali. Sonali realizes that the one she has neglected is her long-lost love. They reunite amidst a jubilant crowd.

== Cast ==
- Jeet as Bijoy Ray, an aspiring singer from Burdwan
- Priyanka Trivedi as Sonali, the love interest of Bijoy who later becomes a renowned singer in Kolkata
- Ranjit Mallick as Keshto Da
- Anamika Saha as Sonali's grandmother
- Rajesh Sharma
- Kanchan Mullick as Bijoy's friend
- Sumitra Mukherjee as Bijoy's mother
- Pushpita Mukherjee as Sonali's friend
- Shyamal Dutta
- Premjit Mukherjee as Member of Rock Band (cameo)
- Sagnik Chatterjee as Head Member of Rock Band (cameo)
- Sanghamitra Bandopadhyay as Keshto Da's wife
- Ramen Roy Chowdhury

== Production ==
=== Development and casting ===
After the successful venture Pratibad (2001), Haranath Chakraborty initially approached Prosenjit Chatterjee to play Bijoy in Sathi making their 8th collaboration. After hearing the story, Chatterjee rejected the role as his age wouldn't match with the age of Bijoy. Then he suggested Chakraborty to find a new face for the role. Jisshu Sengupta auditioned for the role, but was rejected later. Then Jeet came on the board, who was doing theatre then and struggling for cinemas. Priyanka Trivedi was selected to play opposite Jeet and Ranjit Mallick was signed for another pivotal role marking his 12th collaboration with Haranath Chakraborty.

=== Filming ===
The shooting took place in Kolkata, Burdwan, Bolpur and Ramoji Film City. The climax scene of the film was shot at Geetanjali Cinema Hall, a single screen situated in Bolpur, while some song sequences were filmed at Ramoji Film City.

=== Dubbing ===
In the talk show Ghosh & Company, hosted by filmmaker Rituparno Ghosh, Jeet revealed that Haranath Chakraborty and Shrikant Mohta had not wanted him to dub for his role as he was a non-bengali. But Jeet, who was born and grew up in Kalighat and performed in several Bengali language dramas, concentrated on upscaling his Bengali pronunciation. After a long hard work, Jeet requested Chakraborty to allow him for the dubbing. After hearing Jeet's clear Bengali pronunciation, Chakraborty agreed to allow him for dubbing and finally Jeet dubbed for himself.

== Soundtrack ==
Sathi

Soundtrack album by S. P. Venkatesh
- Released: 2002
- Recorded: 2001
- Studio: Shree Venkatesh Films
- Genre: Feature film soundtrack
- Language: Bengali
- Labels: Eskay Video, Venus, Shraddha Music
- Producer: Shree Venkatesh Films

S. P. Venkatesh chronology
Sathi (2002)	Sangee (2003)

Singles from Sathi
- 1. "Ei Bhalobasha" Released: 3 Jun 2016; 2. "Bolbo Tomaye" Released: 20 Jun 2014; 3. "O Bondhu (Female Version)" Released: 21 Jan 2016; 4. "Ei Gaan" Released: 22 Feb 2016; 5. "Bolbo Tomaye" Released: 14 Jun 2017; 6. "Porabasi Dak Diye Jaye" Released: 14 Jun 2017

The music of the film has been composed by S. P. Venkatesh. All the lyrics has been written by Gautam Sushmit.

No.	Title	Singer(s)	Length
1.	"O Bondhu"	Manu	06:09
2.	"Bolbo Tomaye"	Manu, Anuradha Sriram	05:23
3.	"Aalap"	Swarnalata
4.	"Ei Bhalobasha"	Manu	05:33
5.	"O Bondhu (Reprise)"	Manu
6.	"Porabasi Dak Diye Jaye"	Swarnalata, Prabhakar	03:48
7.	"Ei Gaan"	Manu	05:38
8.	"O Bondhu (Female Version)"	Anuradha Sriram	06:12
9.	"Juge Juge Sab Bodlay"	Manu	01:45
10.	"Janina Kothao Aacho"	Manu	04:00

== Awards ==
- Sathi won the Bengal Film Journalists' Association – Best Clean & Entertainment Film Award
- Jeet won the Bengal Film Journalists' Association – Most Promising Actor Award
