= Nater Guru =

- Poster
- Directed by: Haranath Chakraborty
- Written by: Samaresh Basu
- Produced by: Shinjini Movies
- Starring: Jeet; Koel; Ranjit Mallick; Moushmi Chatterjee
- Cinematography: V. Prabhakar
- Edited by: Swapan Guha
- Music by: S. P. Venkatesh
- Distributed by: Eskay Movies
- Release date: 14 March 2003
- Running time: 145 minutes
- Country: India
- Language: Bengali

Nater Guru (English: The main culprit) is a 2003 Indian Bengali-language comedy-drama film directed by Haranath Chakraborty. Based on Samaresh Basu's famous novel of the same name, the film stars Ranjit Mallick, Jeet, Moushumi Chatterjee and Koel Mallick in her debut.

Nater Guru revolves around four main leads — Shashi Bhushan, a bookie in Kolkata race course who always gets defeated in the challenges; Sulochona, Shashi's wife, who keeps herself mutually separated from her husband becoming bored of his involvement in race course; Manisha, their daughter who gets troubled when her mother wants to meet her love interest, Durgadas; and Rabi, a mechanic who is hired to be the false Durgadas in front of Sulochona, by the advice of Shashi's adviser.

The soundtrack and background score of the film was composed by S. P. Venkatesh, while the cinematography was by V. Prabhakar with editing by Swapan Guha. It was a super hit at the box office, with a successful run consisting of 165 days. It is remade into Hindi as Kyun! Ho Gaya Na in 2004.

== Synopsis ==
Shashi and Sulochona are an estranged couple who are mutually separated from each other but not divorced legally. The separation is out of misunderstandings, egoism and preconceived notions from both sides. After 15 years, Sulochona is a business tycoon while Shashibushan is a worthless race course bookie. Their only daughter Manisha is a dancer, and resides with her mother. Sulochana suffers a heart attack and Manisha unable to get help turns to her father. The father-daughter combo decide that the ailing Sulochona can't be given any stress or anxiety. Hence they carry a stealth operation. They decide to hire Shashi's friend and ally Rabi Maitra and present him as Durgadas.

Rabi is required by Manisha to give proxy whenever necessary. He becomes regular. But the two often quarrel and fight over irrelevant issues. Rabi gets insulted by the behaviour of Manisha. Rabi touches Sulochona's feet as Durgadas and brings forth his singing prowess. The music actually heals Sulochona and she is able to walk again. Sulochona loves Rabi. Meanwhile, Sulachona accidentally unravels Rabi's originality. Suluchona admires Rabi's honesty and self-esteem. Rabi's honesty and simplicity makes Manisha fall in love with him. Durgadas creates trouble. But with Shashi's cooperation the lovers reunite. Shashi and Sulochona rediscover their long lost love and the couple get reunited.

== Cast ==
- Jeet as Rabindranath Maitra a.k.a. Rabi
  - Anshu Bach as child Rabi
- Koel as Manisha Mukherjee a.k.a. Mani
- Ranjit Mallick as Shashi Bhushan Mukherjee, Mani's father
- Moushmi Chatterjee as Sulochona Mukherjee, Mani's mother
- Kanchan Mullick as Rabi's Friend
- Nimu Bhowmik as child Rabi's caretaker
- Koushik Bhattacharya as Durgadas
- Ashok Mukhopadhyay
- Pushpita Mukherjee
- Sachin Mullick

== Soundtrack ==
The album is composed by S. P. Venkatesh for Nater Guru. All the lyrics have been written by Gautam Susmit.

Track listing
No.	Title	Singer(s)	Length
1.	"Chirodini Adhare Kete"	Mano	5:33
2.	"Janina Ki Gaibo Ami"	Mano	5:37
3.	"Ami Sukonna Noi Ononna"	SwaranLata	6:08
4.	"Bol Maa Tara Jitbo"	Prabhakar	0:35
5.	"Eito Esechi Tomari"	Mano, Anuradha Sriram	5:55
6.	"Paglire Tor Gerakole"	Mano	4:24
7.	"Thak Thak Baba Thak"	Mano, Anuradha Sriram	4:44
Total length:			35:56
