= Deewana (2013 film) =

- Directed by: Rabi Kinagi
- Written by: NK Salil
- Screenplay by: N K Salil
- Story by: Ezhil
- Based on: Deepavali (2007)
- Produced by: Reliance Entertainment
- Starring: Jeet; Srabanti Chatterjee; Bharat Kaul; Biswajit Chakraborty; Supriyo Datta
- Cinematography: Mohan Verma
- Edited by: Md Kalam
- Music by: Dev Sen
- Release date: 18 January 2013
- Country: India
- Language: Bengali
- Budget: [ 3.75 cr]
- Box office: [ 5.5 cr+]

Deewana is a 2013 Indian Bengali romantic action thriller film directed by Rabi Kinagi starring Jeet and Srabanti Chatterjee in lead roles. The film is a remake of the 2007 Tamil film Deepavali.

== Cast ==
- Jeet as Abhi
- Srabanti Chatterjee as Shruti Roy
- Bharat Kaul as Agnidev Roy
- Arun Bannerjee
- Biswajit Chakraborty as Abhi's father
- Supriyo Datta as Binu da
- Tulika Basu
- Mousumi Das

== Soundtrack ==
Deewana

Soundtrack album by Dev Sen
- Released: January 2013
- Recorded: 2012
- Genre: Feature film soundtrack
- Language: Bengali
- Label: T-Series
- Producer: Renny Johnson

Track listing
No.	Title	Lyrics	Music	Singer(s)	Length
1.	"Deewana (Title Track)"	Priyo Chattapadhyay	Dev Sen	Prasenjit Mallick; Nilakshi Bhattacharjee	4:33
2.	"De Signal"	Prasenjit Mallick	Dev Sen	Zubeen Garg; June Banerjee	4:00
3.	"Jege Achi"	Prasen (Prasenjit Mukherjee)	Dev Sen	Prasenjit Mallick	4:44
4.	"Baja Sanai Aar Baja Re Dhool"	Sudip	Dev Sen	Abhijeet Bhattacharya; Nilakshi Bhattacharjee; Dev Sen	4:44
5.	"Mahi"	Prasenjit Mallick	Dev Sen	Prasenjit Mallick	4:10
6.	"Deewana (Bonus Song)"	Priyo Chattapadhyay	Dev Sen	Shaan; June Banerjee	4:33
