= Keu Bole Biplobi Keu Bole Dakat =

2026 Bengali biographical action film

- Theatrical release poster
- Directed by: Pathikrit Basu
- Screenplay by: Aritra Banerjee; Arpan Gupta
- Dialogues by: Soumit Deb; Arpan Gupta; Aritra Banerjee
- Story by: Aritra Banerjee; Arpan Gupta
- Based on: Keu Bole Biplobi Keu Bole Dakat by Ananta Singh; Paatal Puran by Supriyo Chowdhury
- Produced by: Pradip Kumar Nandy; Jeet
- Starring: Jeet; Tota Roy Chowdhury; Kaushik Sen; Rajatava Dutta
- Cinematography: Soumik Halder
- Edited by: Moloy Laha
- Music by: Shantanu Moitra
- Production companies: Nandy Movies; Jeetz Filmworks
- Distributed by: PVR Inox Pictures
- Release date: 14 August 2026
- Running time: 144 minutes
- Country: India
- Language: Bengali

Keu Bole Biplobi Keu Bole Dakat (Bengali pronunciation: [keu bɔle biplobi keu bɔle ɖakat]; transl. Some call him a Revolutionary, Some call him a Dacoit), also known by the initials KBBKBD, is a 2026 Indian Bengali-language epic biographical action thriller film directed by Pathikrit Basu. Produced by Pradip Kumar Nandy and Jeet under the banners of Nandy Movies and Jeetz Filmworks, the film is based on the life of Indian revolutionary Ananta Singh. Sharing its title with Singh's autobiography, it stars Jeet himself as the fictionalized version of the former, with Tota Roy Chowdhury in the lead roles. Kaushik Sen, Loknath Dey, Rajatava Dutta, Chandan Sen, Durbar Sharma, Sreya Bhattacharya, Subhrajit Dutta and Suprobhat Das play other pivotal roles.

Set in the post-independence era, the film follows the transformation of a revolutionary into the mastermind behind a string of daring robberies, waging a war against corruption. Aritra Banerjee and Arpan Gupta, the screenwriters of the film, conceptualised its story by reimagining the life of Singh, envisioning his participation in the Chittagong armoury raid against the British colonial rule in the 1930s, to a radical justice seeker and successful film producer in the 1960s. The film marks the third collaboration between Basu, Banerjee and Gupta after Dabaru and Shreeman v/s Shreemati. It began production in June 2025, and was officially announced in August 2025. Principal photography commenced in November 2025, and wrapped by in January 2026. Predominantly shot in Kolkata, its portions were shot in Mumbai and Jharkhand. The film's songs and background score were composed by Shantanu Moitra, with cinematography by Soumik Halder and editing by Moloy Laha.

KBBKBD was released in theatres worldwide on 14 August 2026, coinciding with the celebration of Independence day. The film received reviews with praise for its performances, storytelling, soundtrack, and technical aspects.

== Cast ==
- Jeet as Ananta Lal Singh
- Tota Roy Chowdhury as Inspector Durga Prasad Roy
- Kaushik Sen as Bijoy Mukherjee, the Home Minister
- Loknath Dey as Surya Sen / Master Da
- Rajatava Dutta as public prosecutor
- Chandan Sen as Dulal Ray
- Durbar Sharma as Brajeswar "Brojo" Roy
- Debopriyo Mukherjee as SI Ashok Bose
- Debattama Saha as Fatima
- Suprobhat Das as DC Rathijit Neogy, an encounter specialist (based on Runu Guha Neogy)
- Sreya Bhattacharyya as Rupa
- Rajat Ganguly as judge
- Amitabha Bhattacharya as ACP Ranjan Ghoshal
- Abhijit Guha as director
- Neelesh Nandi as AD and Uttam Kumar
- Amit Saha as Bhaba, director's assistant
- Nanak Madnani as Gulab Singh, Ananta's father
- Jammy Banerjee as Raghu
- Somnath Kar as Ananta's attendant
- Koushik Kar as Ambika Chakraborty
- Resad Ajim
- Bonnis Chakraborty as constable

=== Special appearances ===
- Priyanka Sarkar as Godhuli Devi
- Anindya Bandyopadhyay as Subhas Chandra Bose
- Subhrajit Dutta as Kanu Banerjee (based on Bhanu Banerjee)
- Shankar Chakraborty as the government employee
- Kanchan Mullick as constable
- Srijla Guha as Ms. Shefali in the song "Naam Na Jaana"

== Production ==
=== Development ===
In October 2024, it was reported that Jeet would collaborate with Raihan Rafi for the former's 58 film, titled as Lion. An Indo-Bangladesh joint venture, the film was later revealed to be shelved due to high-production costs. The Times of India suggested Nandita Roy and Shiboprosad Mukherjee would direct Jeet in his next project, with their home banner Windows producing, while OTT Play noted that the director had not been finalised, naming Avijit Sen or Pathikrit Basu as potential choices. Later, Srijit Mukherji emerged as a possibility. However, in June 2025, Mukherji confirmed that he was not involved, narrowing the options to Basu. Reports soon suggested Basu was likely to direct, which would be a biopic of Indian revolutionary Ananta Singha. Produced by Pradip Kumar Nandy under the banner of Nandy Movies, the film was confirmed with the title Keu Bole Biplobi Keu Bole Dakat in May 2025, beoming Jeet's first appearance in a biographical film.

Basu, who already had worked with Jeet as director Ravi Kinnagi's assistant in their collaborations like 100% Love (2012), Awara (2012) and Deewana (2013), revealed that he eagerly wanted to collaborate with Jeet for a long time, and would materialize a drama-based script for him. He stated that he intended to showcase the negative shade of Jeet, similar to his earlier performance in Boss (2013) and Chengiz (2023).

=== Pre-production ===
Critic and screenwriter Aritra Banerjee (who runs a YouTube channel named Aritra's Gyan) who frequently collaborated with Basu in his previous directorials Dabaru (2024), Shastri (2024) and Shreeman v/s Shreemati (2025), developed the script spanning over two years, starting from 2023, coming across Singha's autobiography Keu Bole Dakat Keu Bole Biplobi and the real-life stories surrounding him. After Jeet expressed interest, he revised the screenplay in late 2024 along with dialogue writer Arpan Gupta, with the first half alone taking six months to complete.

MD. Kalam, a longtime editor collaborator of Basu, exited due to scheduling conflicts, and was replaced by Moloy Laha. Prominent make-up artist Somnath Kundu designed the looks and character sketches for Jeet. Shantanu Moitra joined the crew as the music director in May 2025, marking his return to Bengali cinema. After Ram Lakshman and Anbariv declined to be roped as stunt directors, Stun Siva came on-board in August 2025. Soumik Halder was signed as its cinematographer in his first collaboration with both Jeet and Basu.

Prior to the start of film production, Jeet attended several workshops in mid-August 2025, in order to train physically and intensively for his role in the film. He reharsed in Lathi Khela, which reportedly had an importance in the storyline. Coinciding with the Independence day, the makers released a promotional video from the sets of KBBKBD on 15 August 2025, showcasing the look-test, workshops for the action sequences attended by Jeet, and the music direction. Pre-production and casting began in the same month, and filming was expected to begin in October 2025. A muhurat puja was held on 22 October 2025 at Jeetz Filmworks' office in Kolkata with the film's cast and crew. A motion poster was released on 27 October 2025, as its first glimpse.

Veteran actor Biswajeet Chatterjee recalled his first meeting with Singh at the actor's then-residence at Ballygunge during the height of his success with the film Maya Mriga (1960), to be approached for the latter's production Dhup Chhaya (1962). He also expressed immense joy and nostalgia upon seeing Jeet portraying Singh, and also voiced strong support for the film, emphasizing Singh’s true identity as a dedicated patriot and visionary producer.

=== Casting ===
"Durga Roy is actually Ananta Singh's nemesis — not in a negative sense, but as a strong law enforcer who stands against the rebellion. It can be said to be a bit like the Mohun Bagan v/s East Bengal conflict, a clash of two great souls from both sides. Tota Da is the right actor who can bring intensity, balance and authority to build a character that is equally at odds with Jeet Da's on-screen aura."

— Pathikrit Basu on directing Jeet and Tota Roy Chowdhury together for the first time on-screen at Aajkaal.

On 26 July 2025, Jeet and Rituparna Sengupta spotted attending the inauguration ceremony of Nandy Movies' new office, whereas the latter also came to join it marking the success of the production house's then-recently released film Madam Sengupta; however, rumors began to circulate about their reunion as an on-screen pair in KBBKBD—22 years after their collaboration in Aakrosh (2004).

Abir Chatterjee was initially cast as Inspector Durga Roy, who got replaced by Tota Roy Chowdhury as the former declined to repeat playing police characters following Bohurupi (2024) and Raktabeej 2 (2025). Tota described the character as "the archnemesis of Ananta Singha," clarifying it wasn't the antagonist. For his role, he addressed Bikash Roy as his inspiration for dialogue throwing. Basu also mentioned it to be "dream come true" to present both Jeet and Tota in full-fledged action avatar.

Rajatava Dutta was featured in the muhurat puja, thereby confirming his inclusion in second collaboration with Basu after Shastri. He would mark his eighth reunion with Jeet 2 years after Boomerang (2024). Kaushik Sen was reported to collaborate with Basu after Dabaru and Shastri, also allying with Jeet for the second time after Boss 2 (2017). Debopriyo Mukherjee joined the film in a prominent role, which was later revealed to be of a police officer.

Regarding his role in the film, Jeet commented that Ananta Singh was a revolutionary for some people, while a dacoit for others. However, he was a man driven by his sense for justice. He remarked that for properly playing his role, Jeet had to understand Singh's mindset, feelings and vulnerabilities. He said that he played Singh's role to represent him to the audience and have them decide what to label him as. Jeet called KBBKBD to be one of the most challenging films of his career, being mentally and physically demanding. He stated Pathikrit Basu's vision and determination to have given him motivation to continue his character in the film. He praised the audience response to the teaser release on August 3, 2026. He further said that the theme was conflict and vision of the revolutionaries.

=== Filming ===
Principal photography was to commence on 5 October 2025 at General Post Office, which got stalled because of the state administration's denial for the shoot on the account of the Durga Puja Carnival 2025 at Red Road on that day. However, it began with the first schedule on 25 October 2026 in Kolkata. It is the third Indian film and the first Bengali film to be shot on Arri Alexa LF and Arri Signature Prime lens. Basu reportedly completed some portions in 8 days, which were supposed to take 10 days. In this schedule, Jeet's entry sequence was filmed at a massive set which was built prior to the filming's commencement, in September, under the supervision of Tanmay Chakraborty, the art director. Usually reluctant to shoot at night, Jeet agreed to shoot this particular scene at 2:00 AM. This schedule was wrapped by in 7 November 2025.

The second schedule took place in Jharkhand in mid-November 2025, in which Debattama joined the team. The team planned to film two sequences for five days at Massanjore Dam in this schedule, including two days of set work on 14–15 November, and three days of filming on 17–18 November 2025, while because of the restrictions by the officials, it was allowed to be shot for four days. where Loknath and Chandan had filmed their most portions with Jeet.

== Themes and influences ==
Aritra Banerjee, a movie critic turned screenwriter, averred his desire to evoke the Jeet of the 2000s and 2010s—a period he characterized as the "zenith of the Jeet epoch". He lauded Kranti (2006) as one of his favourite films, citing it as a reference for the sequences depicting Ananta’s allegorical pattern of larcenies, which were punctuated by the cryptic missive "Kranti Phirchhe" (transl. "The revolution is returning"). Apart from it, the significance of describing Singh as a lion-like figure, referencing it from Dibakar Sinha, the character played by Jeet in Shotru (2011). He also recalled a scene where the police were hanging Singh upside down as a felicitation to Jeet's entry sequence in Fighter (2011). According to Basu, the tight close-up sequences in the film were inspired from the scenes were framed in the emotional scenes in Ghatak (2006). Dipanwita Mukherjee of Anandabazar Patrika argues that KBBKBD pays homage to several Jeet films, especially discussed how Wanted (2010), Fighter and Boss (2013) influenced the film's larger-than-life sequences.

Regarding the biographical dimensions of Ananta Singh, the narrative delves into the enigmatic life and controversial legacy of one of Bengal’s most fascinating revolutionary figures. Through parallel timelines, the narrative contrasts his early life as a fearless freedom fighter under Masterda Surya Sen during the anti-colonial struggle with his later years in 1960s Kolkata, where he organized calculated robberies against corrupt elites. By examining his transformation from an anti-British revolutionary to a disillusioned idealist fighting post-independence corruption, the film explores complex themes of rebellion, justice, and the thin line between a revolutionary hero and an outlaw, including his journey as a producer for the Bhanu Banerjee starrer cult classic Jamalaye Jibanta Manush (1958). Besides, Arpan Gupta reminisced a sequence where the police forcibly tortures Sinha by pouring milk into his mouth to break his hunger strike, was actually inspired by an incident involving Jatindra Nath Das, another freedom fighter.

KBBKBD suggests some socio-political themes that hint towards the identitiy debates of Bengal; Ananta Lal Singh called identified himself as a fierce Bengali. The film highlights Singh's resistance against non-Bengalis while circumventing any mentions that the Partition of India caused. Specifically, the interval of the film also alluded the concept of a creature operating purely on truth, instinct, and uncorrupted loyalty represents an absolute force from Mahaprasthanika Parva from the Mahabharata, where Yudhishthira’s ultimate companion on his path to truth and righteousness (Dharma) was a dog. Basu cited the concept as the "basis" for the creation of the character of Watson. Arindam Chatterjee of t2Online opined the interval block as "the most striking moment of the film".

== Soundtrack ==
Keu Bole Biplobi Keu Bole Dakat

Soundtrack album by Shantanu Moitra
- Genre: Feature film soundtrack

Shantanu Moitra chronology
Pradhan (2023)	Keu Bole Biplobi Keu Bole Dakat (2026)

The soundtrack was composed by veteran composer Shantanu Moitra.

The first single "Jago Desh" was released on 16 July 2026.

The song "Tumi Bolo" from the film album has been described as a motivational anthem describing the need for patience and perseverance to continue after failures. The song lyrics were written by Barish. The song lyrics justifies the armed rebellion conducted by the rebels who were livid from the exploitations of the colonial rulers. A philosophical song, it expresses the concept of morality and the complexity of Ananta Singh.

Track listing
No.	Title	Singer(s)	Length
1.	"Jago Desh"	Rupankar Bagchi, Soumyadipta Mukherjee, Soumyabrata Banerjee, Suphal Das, Satwick Bhattacharjee, Debojyoti Mukherjee, Ayon Dhar, Aadrita Bose, Sristita Singha, Swarnali Majumder, Riyanki Ghosh, George Joseph	4:27
2.	"Bhor"	Adriz Ghosh	4:36
3.	"Tumi Bolo"	Durnibar Saha	5:28
4.	"Naam Na Jana"	Shreya Ghoshal	3:13

== Marketing ==
A promotional announcement teaser, titled "KBBKBD Royal Reveal" was released on 30 November 2025, on the occasion of Jeet's 47th birthday. The official teaser itself was released on 19 March 2026. On the occasion of Eid, a poster was revealed on 21 March 2026, featuring Jeet in nine different looks.

On 9 July 2026, a motion poster was released, featuring the entire cast and announcing the release date as 14 August 2026.

KBBKBD had a star-studded premier event on 24 August 2026, which was attended by renowned film personalities, including Koel Mallick, Mamata Shankar, Chiranjeet Chakraborty, Kaushik Ganguly, Mimi Chakraborty, Biswanath Basu, Arindam Sil, Ishaa Saha, Lahoma Bhattacharya, Soham Chakraborty, Nusrat Jahan and Vikram Chatterjee. As a part of the post release promotions, Dev came to watch the film, accompanying Jeet. On the occasion of 25 day completion ceremony, Prosenjit Chatterjee joined a special screening and praised the film on his social media handles, also cutting the celebration cake.

== Release ==
=== Theatrical ===
KBBKBD was initially scheduled to release on 16 October 2026, on the occasion of Durga Puja. It was slated to release alongside DeSu 7, hinting a clash between Jeet and Dev, four years after their respective releases Raavan (2022) and Kishmish (2022). However, it got preponed to 27 May 2026 as the screening committee declared a calender for the film releases. Coinciding with the summer vacation, the film was scheduled to be released alongside Phool Pishi O Edward. However, it was further postponed due to post-production in Mumbai, as per the clarification by co-producer Nandy. Also, there was some rumours of his selling the film rights to Surinder Films, which were also proved to be wrong.

On 9 July 2026, the team announced the release on 14 August 2026, a day before India's Independence Day. The announcement was made with a motion poster, featuring the principal cast of the film. Following Jeet's comeback after 2 years, Dev postponed the scheduled release on that day for his 50th film Bike Ambulance Dada.

== Reception ==
=== Box office ===
Within the third week of its release, Keu Bole Biplobi Keu Bole Dakat performed well at the box office collections. It was screened in multiplex and single screens and theaters. The film was rivaled by several other Hindi and Bollywood films which were made on high budgets. The number of showings allotted to KBBKBD was increased following the mass buying of tickets by viewers. KBBKBD marked as a successful project of Jeet in the box office, surpassing his other released movies after COVID-19 such as Manush and Raavan. Some critics stated that KBBKBD might surpass all of Jeet's films considering his return to cinema after two years. No other film other than KBBKBD was released on August 14, though Bike Ambulance Dada was supposed to be released on the date, but was postponed for unknown reasons. Other films it coincided with are Batwara 1947 and Awarapan 2.

=== Critical reception ===
Anurupa Chakraborty of The Indian Express gave the film 3.5 out of 5 stars, remarking that Jeet has returned after a long hiatus, and the fact that he has poured his heart and soul into this film is evident as Ananta. Oyeshi Ganguly and Shriya Dasgupta of The Print jointly reviewed the film and commented "As oral historians, we have often struggled to watch period dramas, especially on the subject of our research: the Indian revolutionaries. This can be largely attributed to the outright falsehoods often propagated in such movies, which reflect a glaring lack of research and not necessarily creative liberties, as is often claimed". Eshna Bhattacharya of The Times of India rated the film 3/5 stars and wrote "The first half is good and tightly constructed, confidently paced, and strong enough on its own terms that it would hold up as a complete film in miniature. It doesn't over-explain its stakes or lean on exposition; it trusts the momentum of the story itself, and that trust pays off, whereas the second half asks more of the audience, and it's worth being honest about where it falters". She also cited Jeet's performance as "the most complete of his career", and was appraisal of Basu's direction, Halder's cinematography and Maitra's score. A critic from Sangbad Pratidin reviewed the film on a positive note and wrote "Jeet appears in this film in various guises—sporting different makeup and portraying characters of diverse ages, the way he presents himself on screen, stirs up a sense of patriotism with adrenaline-pumping dialogues, and executes action sequences reminiscent of Hollywood films is sure to win over the hearts of the new generation of viewers".

Souvik Saha of Cine Kolkata rated the film 4.5/5 stars and commended KBBKBD's political storytelling, quoting "The film is busy as one action crescendo after another, full of kinetic camerawork, bustling crowd scenes, elaborate set design, expensive-looking CGI, and loud sound effects". Dharitri Ganguly of Indulge Express opined "after a long time, an action-packed film with very less usage of guns or showing any bloodshed, rather considering the way our revolutionaries would fight back, using mostly physical strength, targeting on sensitive points in the body". Rahul Desai of The Hollywood Reporter commented "One glimpse of Jeet in Pathikrit Basu's KBBKBD and you just know he is the G.O.A.T". Aarti Tiwari of IWMBuzz rated the film 3.5 out of 5 stars and wrote "The director, with gritty execution and conviction, captures the film’s rawness and intensity. The period setting adds authenticity to the storytelling, while the action sequences bring a rugged intensity to the proceedings".

A reviewer of MissFilmy rated the film 8/10 stars and quoted "The screenplay by Aritra Banerjee and Arpan Gupta tries to connect these different periods without reducing Ananta to a one-dimensional patriotic figure. Soumik Halder’s visual treatment also supports the film’s darker crime-drama elements without losing its historical character." A correspondent of Aajkaal considered Jeet's presence in the film as a translation to a whirlwind performance on screen as well as his performance to be one of his greatest and most mature performances in his career. He also wrote "Every scene feels like an unputdownable chapter, creating an atmosphere from which one simply cannot tear their eyes away". A critic from Aaro Ananda wrote, "For a film like this, a hard-hitting title song was sorely needed, but it is missing. Jeet has poured his heart and soul into this film; he truly deserves to be saluted for it".

A reviewer of The Hawk rated the film 4.5 out of 5 stars and opined "KBBKBD has several whistle-worthy moments; It is drama, drama, drama all the way in which the director has not only bitten more than he can chew but exhibits his diehard admiration for Jeet". Aratrika Dey of Ei Samay quoted "Keu Bole Biplobi Keu Bole Dakat did not aspire to become a history textbook; instead, it sought to offer big-screen entertainment centered around a familiar yet underutilized historical figure". She also added that Jeet's dialogue delivery and physical presence had lent added momentum to the film. Rahul Mehta of Indian Community wrote "Jeet is fabulous. Tota Roy Chowdhury fleshes out his trademark larger-than-life mannerisms into Pathikrit's quirky storytelling".
