= Rajatava Dutta filmography =

Films starring Rajatava Dutta

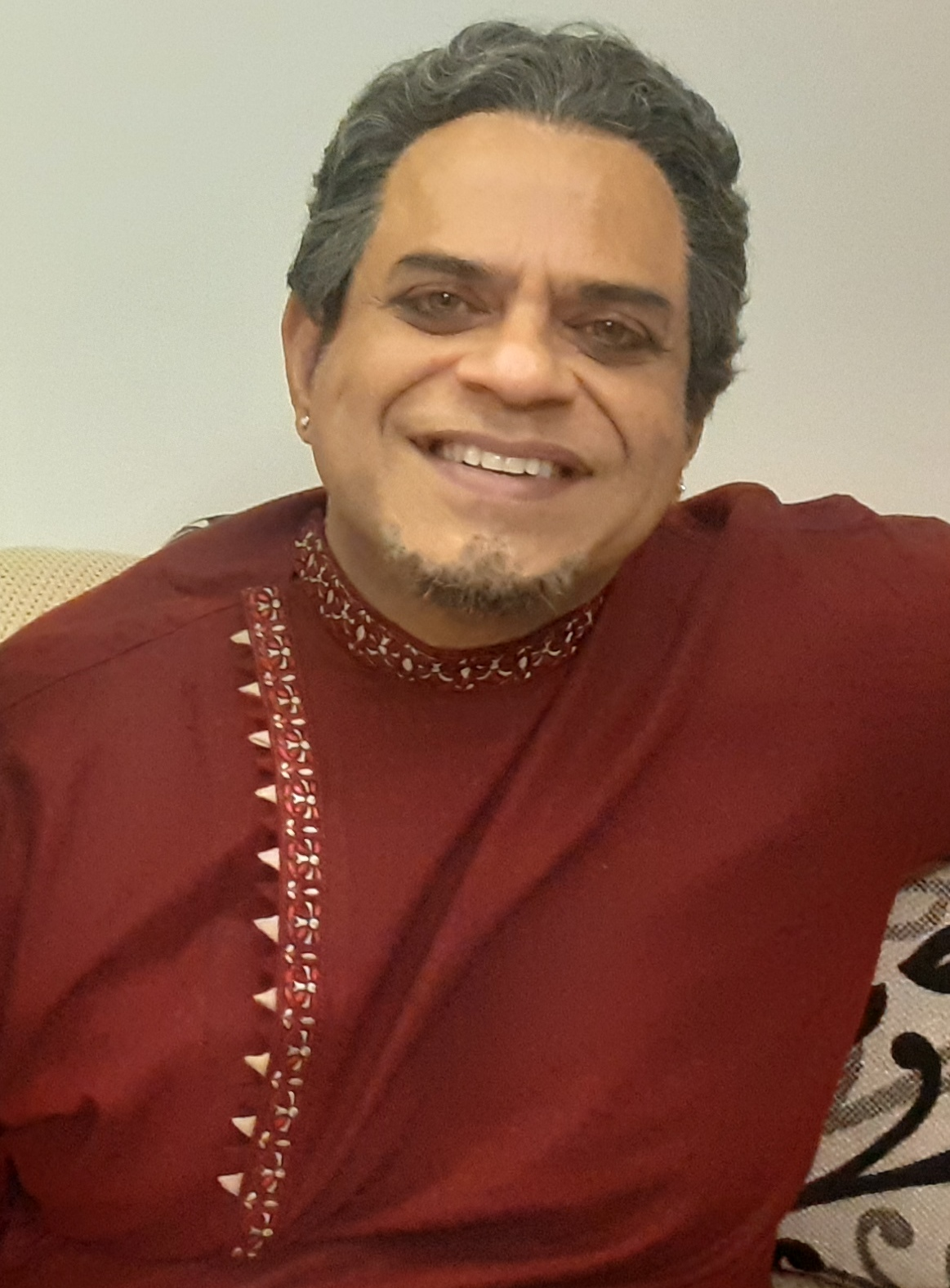
- Rajatava Dutta in 2021
- Film: 200+
- Television series: 3+
- Web series: 14+

Rajatava Dutta is an Indian actor known for his work in Bengali cinema, television, and web series. Over the course of his career, he has portrayed a wide range of characters and earned critical acclaim for his versatile performances. Active in the Bengali entertainment industry since the 1990s, Dutta is particularly noted for his roles in comedy, villainous, family-drama, and mystery films.

He has appeared in numerous commercially successful and critically acclaimed productions, establishing himself as one of the most versatile actors in Bengali-language entertainment.

== Films ==
| Year | Title | Role | Director | Notes |
|---|---|---|---|---|
| 1994 | Wheel Chair | Asaaulter | Tapan Sinha | |
| 1997 | Nayantara | | Raja Mitra | |
| 1998 | Ajab Gayer Ajab Katha | | Tapan Sinha | |
| 2000 | Paromitar Ek Din | | Aparna Sen | |
| 2000 | Y2K (Athoba, 'Sex Krome Aasitechhe') | Bhuto | Chandril Bhattacharya | |
| 2002 | Prohor | Biltu | Subhadra Chowdhury | |
| 2002 | Chena Britter Baire | | Sabyasachi Chakraborty | |
| 2002 | Mr. and Mrs. Iyer | Card player #1 | Aparna Sen | |
| 2003 | Nil Nirjane | Brigadier | Subrata Sen | |
| 2003 | In the Forest... Again | Tea Estate Manager | Goutam Ghose | |
| 2003 | Raasta | | Bratya Basu | |
| 2003 | Bombaiyer Bombete | | Sandip Ray | |
| 2004 | Abar Asbo Phire | | Ravi Ojha | |
| 2004 | Barood | | T.L.V. Prasad | |
| 2005 | Manik | Anwar | Probhat Roy | |
| 2005 | Mantra | Mantra Shiba | Raviranjan Maitra | |
| 2005 | Yuddho | | Rabi Kinagi | |
| 2005 | Ek Mutho Chabi | | Argyakamal Mitra | |
| 2005 | Nayak Nuhen Khalanayak | | Ratan Adhikari | Bengali, Oriya |
| 2006 | Ghatak | Binoy Samanta | Swapan Saha | |
| 2006 | M.L.A. Fatakesto | Ranadeb Pal | Swapan Saha | |
| 2006 | Nayak The Real Hero | Vrindavan | Sujit Guha | |
| 2006 | Abhimanyu | | Swapan Saha | |
| 2006 | Priyotama | | Prabhat Roy | |
| 2007 | Chakra | | Sanghamitra Chowdhury | |
| 2007 | Sangharsha | Janardhan | Sujit Guha | |
| 2007 | Tulkalam | Haripada Samanta | Haranath Chakraborty | |
| 2007 | Prem | | Tapan Banerjee | |
| 2007 | Bandhu | | Prashant Nanda | |
| 2007 | I Love You | Mona's father | Rabi Kinagi | |
| 2007 | Tiger | | Swapan Saha | |
| 2007 | Kalishankar | Gittu Hotelwalla | Prashant Nanda | |
| 2008 | Hochheta Ki? | | Basu Chatterjee | |
| 2008 | Aamar Pratigya | | Swapan Saha | |
| 2008 | Golmaal | Uncle | Swapan Saha | |
| 2008 | Bajimaat | | Haranath Chakraborty | |
| 2008 | Mahakaal | | Swapan Ghosal | |
| 2008 | Ram Baloram | | Shubham | |
| 2009 | Challenge | Agnidev Sen | Raj Chakraborty | |
| 2009 | Swarnali Jaal | Sandeep Ghose | Sabyasachi Chakraborty | |
| 2009 | Olot Palot | | Swapan Saha | |
| 2009 | Kaminey | Shumon | Vishal Bhardwaj | Hindi film |
| 2009 | Friend | Mr. Rajat | Satabdi Roy | |
| 2009 | Amar Sanghee | | Subhash Sen | |
| 2009 | Alo | | Tulirekha Roy | Short film |
| 2010 | Thikana Rajpath | | Kanoj Das | |
| 2010 | Lajja -The Shame | | Dayal Acharya | |
| 2010 | Krodh | | Shankar Ray | |
| 2010 | Mon Niye | | Swapan Saha | |
| 2010 | Path Jodi Na Sesh Hoi | | Swapan Saha | |
| 2010 | Rehmat Ali | | Partho Ghosh | |
| 2010 | Shono Mon Boli Tomay | | Prodip Saha | |
| 2010 | Kakhono Biday Bolo Na | | S.K. Muralidharan | |
| 2010 | Jor Jar Muluk Tar | | Haranath Chakraborty | |
| 2010 | Kachhe Achho Tumi | | Pallab Ghosh | |
| 2010 | Kellafate | Police Officer | Pijush Saha | |
| 2010 | Hing Ting Chot | | Anasua Roychoudhury | |
| 2010 | Lukochurii | | Rishi | |
| 2011 | Handcuff | | Sanat Dutta | |
| 2011 | Ei Aranya | | Somnath Sen | |
| 2011 | Bajikar | | Pradyot Bhattacharya | |
| 2011 | Mon Bole Priya Priya | | Milan Bhowmik | |
| 2011 | Takhan Teish | Sandipan | Atanu Ghosh | |
| 2011 | Bye Bye Bangkok | | Aniket Chattopadhyay | Special appearance |
| 2011 | Cholo Paltai | | Haranath Chakraborty | |
| 2011 | Paglu | Rimi's father | Rajib Biswas | |
| 2011 | Uro Chithi | Rohit | Kamaleswar Mukherjee | |
| 2011 | Bhorer Pakhi | | Tapan Dutta | |
| 2011 | Piya Tumi | | Swapan Saha | |
| 2012 | Goray Gondogol | | Aniket Chattopadhyay | |
| 2012 | Le Halua Le | | Raja Chanda | |
| 2012 | Paglu 2 | Dubai Keshto | Sujit Mondal | |
| 2012 | Sector V | | Souradip Banerjee | |
| 2012 | Challenge 2 | Madhusudhan Bakshi | Raja Chanda | |
| 2012 | 3 Kanya | Subhash Sen | Agnidev Chatterjee | |
| 2012 | Blackmail | | Surya Saha | |
| 2012 | Bawali Unlimited | | Sujit Mondal | |
| 2012 | Prem Leela | | Goutam Majumdar | |
| 2013 | Golemale Pirit Koro Na | | Anindya Banerjee | Special appearance |
| 2013 | Loveria | Shantimoy Roy | Raja Chanda | |
| 2013 | Namte Namte | Ananda | Rana Basu | |
| 2013 | Sweetheart | | Prodip Saha | Telugu, Bengali |
| 2013 | Khoka 420 | Megha's father | Rajib Biswas | |
| 2013 | Ek Thi Daayan | Dr. Ranjan Palit | Kannan Iyer | Hindi film |
| 2013 | Kanamachi | CM | Raj Chakraborty | |
| 2013 | Manashpriya | | Anjan Ganguly | |
| 2013 | Boss: Born to Rule | Rajshekhar Sinha | Baba Yadav | |
| 2013 | Khiladi | Mohsin Khan | Ashok Pati | |
| 2013 | Rangbaaz | Madhurima's father | Raja Chanda | |
| 2013 | Ashchorjyo Prodeep | Genie | Anik Datta | |
| 2013 | Amra Paanch | | Ashish Mitra | |
| 2013 | Villain | | Tota Roy Chowdhury | Bengali, Kannada |
| 2013 | The Oasis | Bikash Sen | Saptaswa Basu | |
| 2013 | Jiboner Rong | | Dipankar Bhattacharya | |
| 2014 | Once Upon A Time In Kolkata | Jiten | Satarupa Sanyal | |
| 2014 | Bangali Babu English Mem | | Ravi Kinnagi | |
| 2014 | Pendulum | Chitresh | Soukarya Ghosal | |
| 2014 | Chaar | Kishorilal | Sandip Ray | tele film |
| 2014 | Bonku Babu | | Anindya Bikas Datta | |
| 2014 | Golpo Holeo Shotti | Ratul Ghosh | Birsa Dasgupta | |
| 2014 | Akkarshan | | Devraj Sinha | |
| 2014 | Yoddha | Abu Hossain | Raj Chakraborty | |
| 2014 | Pati Parameshwar | Arindam Chatterjee | Jayasree Bhattacharyya | |
| 2014 | Badshahi Angti | Ganesh | Sandip Ray | |
| 2015 | Open Tee Bioscope | Gopeshwar Bhowmick | Anindya Chatterjee | |
| 2015 | O Kay...? At Night In The Forest | | Somnath Gupta | |
| 2015 | Kanchenjungha Express | | Arnab Ghosh | |
| 2015 | Natoker Moto: Like a Play | Bhabodulal | Debesh Chatterjee | |
| 2015 | Cocktail | | Swapan Saha | |
| 2015 | Natoker Moto | The Investigating Officer | Debesh Chattopadhyay | |
| 2015 | Jomer Raja Dilo Bor | Yamraj 1 | Abir Sengupta | |
| 2015 | Aashiqui - True Love | | Ashok Pati | |
| 2015 | Love in Rajastan | | Debraj Sinha | |
| 2015 | Not A Dirty Film | Detective | Ranadeep Sarkar | |
| 2015 | Rajkahini | Nawaab | Srijit Mukherji | |
| 2015 | Black | Samrat Sarkar | Raja Chanda | |
| 2015 | Chitrahar @ Cinema Noy Ganema | | Sankho Banerjee | |
| 2016 | Sathiya | | Shiv Bubun Chatterjee | |
| 2016 | Angaar | Surjo Mandal | Wajed Ali Sumon | Indo-Bangladesh joint production |
| 2016 | Bancha Elo Phire | | Amitabha Pathak | |
| 2016 | Bossgiri | Double DK | Shamim Ahamed Roni | Bangladeshi film |
| 2016 | Power | | Rajiv Kumar Biswas | |
| 2016 | Badsha - The Don | Tarun | Baba Yadav | |
| 2016 | Hera Pheri | | Sujit Guha | |
| 2016 | Beparoyaa | | Pijush Saha | |
| 2016 | Vhanu | | Provas Sardar | |
| 2016 | Shororipu | Joshua Bane | Ayan Chakraborty | |
| 2016 | Hukumat Kee Aandhi | | Haranath Chakraborty | Bhojpuri film |
| 2016 | Byomkesh Pawrbo | Badrinath Das | Arindam Sil | |
| 2016 | Haripada Bandwala | | Pathikrit Basu | |
| 2017 | Dhatteriki | Judge Mirza | Shamim Ahamed Roni | Bangladeshi film |
| 2017 | Meri Pyaari Bindu | Bubla's Father | Akshay Roy | |
| 2017 | K: Secret Eye | Sam | Abhirup Ghosh | |
| 2017 | Jagga Jasoos | Inspector | Anurag Basu | Hindi |
| 2017 | Nabab | IPS Gautam Babu | Joydeep Mukherjee | |
| 2017 | Haripada Haribol | Haripada / Harry | Subir Saha | |
| 2017 | Rangbaaz | | Abdul Mannan Gazipuri, Shamim Ahamed Roni | |
| 2017 | Shrestha Bangali | Mama | Swapan Saha | |
| 2017 | Bolo Dugga Maiki | Gobor | Raj Chakraborty | |
| 2017 | Projapoti Biskut | Niyogi Da | Anindya Chatterjee | |
| 2017 | Geodesy | | Tathagata Mukherjee | Short film |
| 2018 | Total Dadagiri | Jonaki's Father | Pathikrit Basu | |
| 2018 | Chalbaaz | Raja's Assistant | Joydip Mukherjee | |
| 2018 | Boxer | Rony's Father | Sanjoy Bardhon | |
| 2018 | Noor Jahan | | Abhimanyu Mukherjee | |
| 2018 | Guptodhoner Sondhane | Dashanan Da | Dhrubo Banerjee | |
| 2018 | Khuje Berai Taare | | Tushar Majumdar | |
| 2018 | Alik Prem | | Ganesh Shaw | |
| 2018 | Bhaijaan Elo Re | Ranveer | Joydip Mukherjee | |
| 2018 | Hoichoi Unlimited | Sital Roy | Aniket Chattopadhyay | |
| 2018 | Manojder Adbhut Bari | Bhaja | Anindya Chatterjee | |
| 2018 | Abraham | The Father | Konarak Mukherjee | |
| 2018 | Tobuo Basanta | | Satarupa Sanyal, Debojit Ghosh | |
| 2018 | Bagh Bandi Khela | | Sujit Mondal, Haranath Chakraborty, Raja Chanda | |
| 2018 | Rosogolla | Kalidas Indra | Pavel | |
| 2018 | Naqaab | | Rajiv Kumar Biswas | |
| 2018 | A Tale of a Day & a Night | Dr. Rajat Subhra Majumder | Prosenjit Choudhury | |
| 2019 | Goyenda Tatar | | Srikanta Galui | |
| 2019 | Jah Kala Horke Gelo Hiseb | | Anirban Chakroborty | |
| 2019 | Mukhomukhi | Agnibha | Kamaleswar Mukherjee | |
| 2019 | Bouma | Mr Dutta | Debatma Mandal | Short film |
| 2019 | Jah Kala | | Anirban Chakraborty | |
| 2019 | Bristi Tomake Dilam | | Arnab Paul | |
| 2019 | Nolok | Nader Talukder | Sakib Sonet | Bangladeshi film |
| 2019 | Sagardwipey Jawker Dhan | Al-Mahri | Sayantan Ghosal | |
| 2019 | Zombiesthaan | Raja Horidas | Abhirup Ghosh | |
| 2019 | 3 Star Split | | Shibram Sharma | Short film |
| 2020 | Mukhosh | | Arghadeep Chatterjee | |
| 2020 | Jio Jamai | | Nehal Dutta | |
| 2020 | Din Ratrir Golpo | Forensic Professor | Prosenjit Choudhury | |
| 2020 | Aparichito | | Arindam Bhattacharya | |
| 2020 | Dui Shalik | Partha | Tamal Sen | Short film |
| 2021 | Aloukik | | Jaydeep Routh | |
| 2021 | Amar Challenge | | Nehal Dutta | |
| 2021 | Bob Biswas | Shekhar Chatterjee | Diya Annapurna Ghosh | |
| 2021 | Antardhaan | | Arindam Bhattacharya | |
| 2021 | Tonic | Ananda Kar | Avijit Sen | |
| 2021 | Sarbabhuteshu | | Sharmistha Deb | |
| 2022 | NeetiShastra | | Arunava Khasnobis | |
| 2022 | Kulpi | | Barshali Chatterjee | |
| 2022 | Bikkhov | Azgor | Shamim Ahamed Roni | Bangladeshi film |
| 2022 | Bhotbhoti | Harishchandra Dome | Tathagata Mukherjee | |
| 2022 | Kolkata Chalantika | | Pavel | |
| 2022 | Karnasubarner Guptodhon | Dashanan Daw | Dhrubo Banerjee | |
| 2022 | Bijoya Dashami | | Souvik Dey | |
| 2022 | Tritiyo | Inspector Aditya Sinha | Animesh Bose | |
| 2022 | After That | | Anindya Chatterjee | Short film |
| 2022 | Ikir Mikir | Ranjan Sanyal | Ratool Mukherjee | |
| 2023 | Maayakumari | Sheetal Bhattacharya | Arindam Sil | |
| 2023 | Daal Baati Churma | | Haranath Chakraborty | |
| 2023 | Archir Gallery | | Promita Bhattacharya | |
| 2023 | The Eken: Ruddhaswas Rajasthan | Prof. Satadru Ghosh | Joydeep Mukherjee | |
| 2023 | Master Anshuman | | Sagnik Chatterjee | |
| 2023 | Aador | Joyram Mukherjee | Debdut Ghosh | |
| 2023 | Shibpur | Nepal Bhattacharya | Arindam Bhattacharjee | |
| 2023 | Byomkesh O Durgo Rahasya | Manilal's father | Birsa Dasgupta | |
| 2023 | Cafe Wall | Mr. Banerjee | Arudipta Dasgupta | |
| 2023 | Kothay Tumi | | Anthony Jane | |
| 2023 | Ektu Sore Bosun | Sphatik | Kamaleshwar Mukherjee | |
| 2023 | Bogla Mama | Felu Acharya | Dhrubo Banerjee | |
| 2023 | Sob Koro Prem Koro Naa | Ronny's Brother | Devraj Sinha | TV film |
| 2023 | Nidhon | | Sanjay Das | |
| 2024 | Boomerang | Isha's father | Sauvik Kundu | |
| 2024 | Mafia The Don | | Gobinda Raj Pandit | |
| 2024 | AK47 | | Biplab Kayal | |
| 2024 | Shastri | Ramen Bagchi | Pathikrit Basu | |
| 2024 | Kohinoor | General Aditya | Sourav Das | |
| 2024 | Indira | | Shyamal Bose | |
| 2024 | Rudraa | | Bappaditya Nandi | |
| 2024 | Myth and Pieces | Prof. Rakshit | Orko Mukherjee | |
| 2025 | Turuper Tass | Vanupratap | Debjit Hazra | |
| 2025 | Anandi: Meyeder Protishodher Larai | | Kunal Bhandari | |
| 2025 | Pataligunjer Putul Khela | Subodh Mal | Subhankar Chattopadhyay | |
| 2025 | Balaram Kando | Kishore Sanyal | Saptaswa Basu | |
| 2025 | Hangama.com | Birat | Krishnendu Chatterjee | |
| 2025 | The Ferocious Ugraaa | | Pritam Dutta | |
| 2025 | Kalponik | Professor Rakshit | Arka Mukhopadhyay | independent film |
| 2025 | Jhor | Anilava | Anthony Jane | |
| 2025 | College Campus | Jahuri | Purnendu Halder | |
| 2025 | Porii Monii | | Siddhartha Chakraborty, Souvik Dey | |
| 2025 | Rappa Roy & Full Stop Dot Com | | Dhiman Barman | |
| 2026 | Khancha | | Anirban Chakraborty | |
| 2026 | Promoter Boudi | Panchanan Podder | Sourya Deb | |
| 2026 | Saptadingar Guptodhon | Dashanan Daw | Dhrubo Banerjee | |
| 2026 | Phool Pishi O Edward | Police officer Balmiki Ghorai | Nandita Roy, Shiboprosad Mukherjee | |
| 2026 | Peddi | Police Officer | Buchi Babu Sana | Telugu film |
| 2026 | Keu Bole Biplobi Keu Bole Dakat | | Soumik Haldar, Pathikrrit Basu | |
| 2026 | Bohurupi: The Golden Daku | | Nandita Roy, Shiboprosad Mukherjee | |
| 2026 | Winkle Twinkle | | Srijit Mukherji | |
| 2026 | DeSu7 | | Dev | |
| TBA | Tarpor | | Kaushik Ganguly | |
| TBA | Maharat | | Atiul Islam | |
| TBA | Shelai | | Swarup Paul | |
| TBA | Ami Amar Moto | Rasik lal | Kamaleswar Mukherjee | |

== Series ==
| Year | Title | Role | Network | Ref. |
|---|---|---|---|---|
| 2000 - 2005 | Ek Akasher Niche | Atul | Alpha Bangla | |
| 2012 | 3 Women | Subhash Sen | | |
| 2018 | Dhanbad Blues | Mrinal Sen | Hoichoi | |
| | Mirakkel | Judge | Zee Bangla | |
| 2019 | Water Bottle | Jyotileshwar | ZEE5 | |
| 2019 | The Stoneman Murders | | Hoichoi | |
| 2020 | Hasiwala and Company | Judge | Star Jalsha | |
| 2020 | Sri Ramkrishna | Ramchand | Jio Studios | |
| 2022 | Byadh | Kanai Choron | Hoichoi | |
| 2022 | #BHAGAR | Idrish Ali | Klikk | |
| 2022 | The Bengal Scam: Bima Kando | | Hoichoi | |
| 2022 | Inspector Nalinikanta | Inspector Nalini Kundu | Klikk | |
| 2023 | Guns & Gulaabs | Sukanto Chatterjee | Netflix | |
| 2023 | Tooth Pari: When Love Bites | Dr. Bidyut Roy | Netflix | |
| 2023 | Institute of Isspecial Talents | | Hoichoi | |
| 2024 | Feludar Goyendagiri | Justice Siddheshwar Mallick | Hoichoi | |
| 2025 | Bhog | Bhavesh Bhattacharjee | Hoichoi | |
| 2025 | Nikhoj | | Hoichoi | |
| 2025 | Uncle 1979 | | Darshoo | |

== Playback ==
| Year | Films | Works | Ref. |
|---|---|---|---|
| 2013 | Ashchorjyo Prodeep | Ei Pellai Office - The Office Song/The Dialogue Song | |
| 2017 | Jagga Jasoos | | |
| 2018 | Manojder Adbhut Bari | | |
| 2021 | Golper Notey Gachhe | Mon Kharaper Osudh | |
