= Birpurush =

Birpurush may refer to:

- "Birpurush" (poem), a 1903 poem written by Rabindranath Tagore that depicts a child's fantasy of saving his mother from dacoits
- Birpurush (play), a 2010 Bengali language play created by theatre group Swapnasandhani
