= Durga Puja in Kolkata =

Hindu festival

- UNESCO Intangible Cultural Heritage
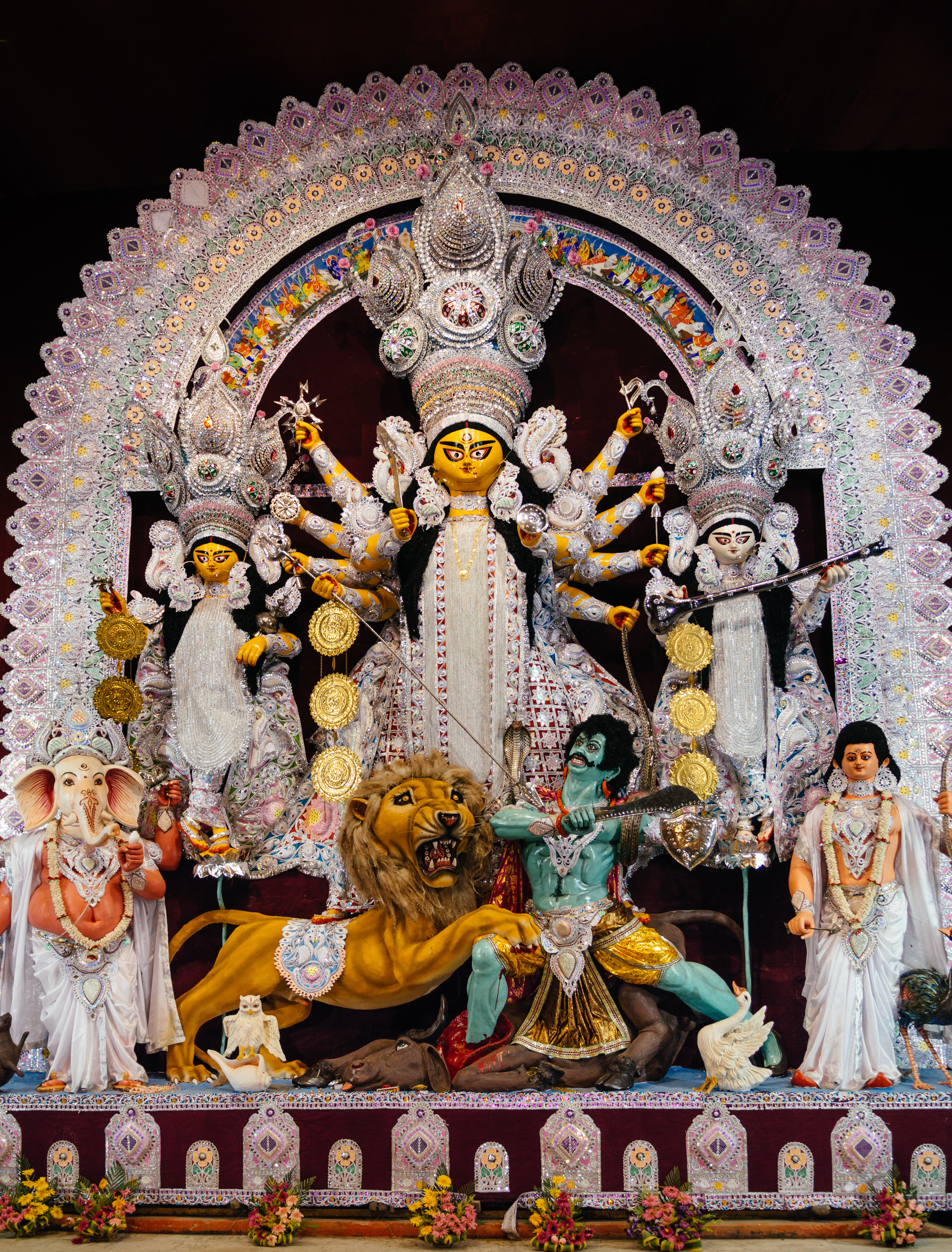
- Durga Puja being celebrated in Bagbazar, Kolkata
- Country: India
- Reference: 00703
- Region: Asia and the Pacific

Inscription history
- Inscription: 2021 (16th session)
- List: Representative
- Certificate : direct link

Durga Puja in Kolkata (Bengali: কলকাতার দুর্গাপূজা) is an annual Bengali Hindu festival celebrated marking the worship of the Hindu mother goddess Durga. This festival is the biggest festival in Kolkata, the capital of the Indian state of West Bengal.

There were about 3,000 Barowari pujas in Kolkata in 2022. More than 200 pujas were organized in the city with a budget of over one crore rupees.

Durga Puja in Kolkata has been inscribed on the list of UNESCO Intangible Cultural Heritage Lists in December 2021.

== History ==
=== Beginning ===
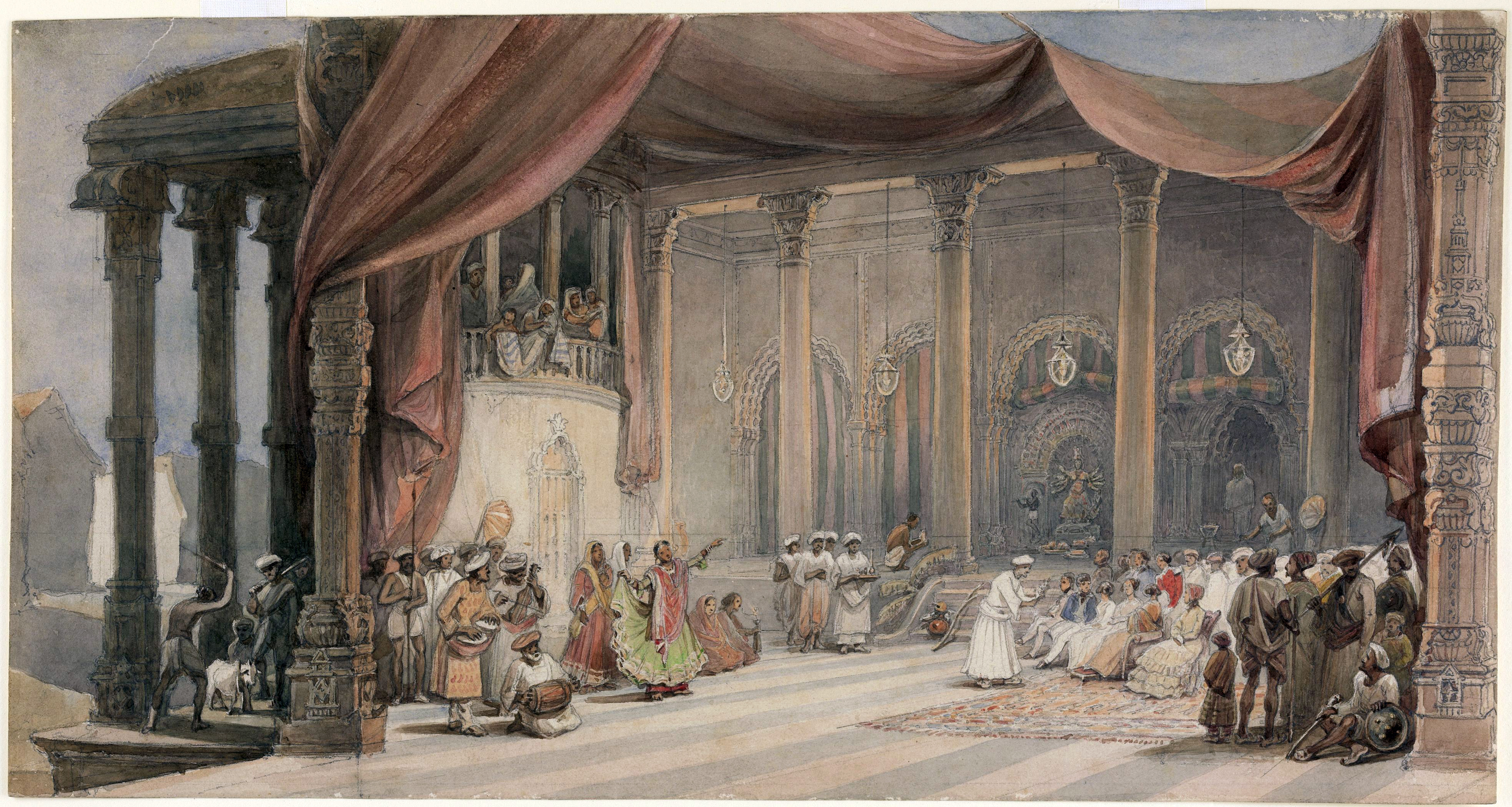
Durga Puja festivities by 19th-century Kolkata dancers and musicians

Since 1610, the Sabarna Roy Choudhury family has been organizing Durga Puja at their original residence in Barisha, Kolkata. This is probably the oldest Durga Puja festival in Kolkata. Nabakrishna Dev started Durga Puja at Shobhabazar Rajbari in 1757.

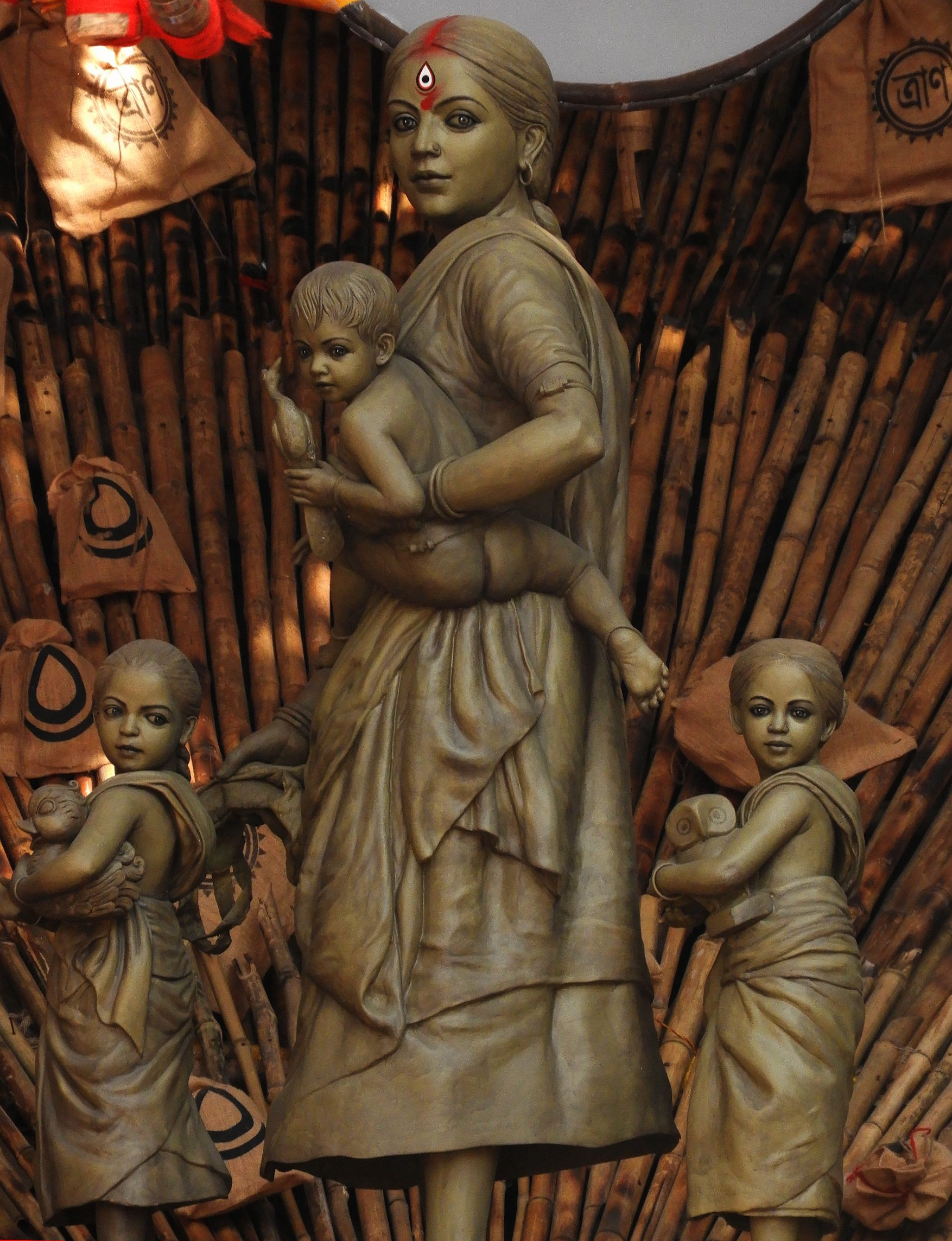
Durga idol in a theme puja pandal in Barisha, Kolkata

Barowari Durga Puja began in Kolkata in the early part of the twentieth century. Barwari Durga Puja quickly became a common people's festival in Kolkata. Earlier, Durga Puja in Kolkata was confined to wealthy families. In 1910, the first Barowari Durga Puja in Kolkata was organized by "Bhowanipore Sanatan Dharmatsahini Sabha" at Balram Basu Ghat Road, Bhowanipore.

Since 1985, the Asian Paints Authority has introduced the practice of awarding the Durga Puja Committees of Kolkata. This award is called the Asian Paints Sharad Shamman. Later many other commercial organizations introduced "Sharad Samman" or Durga Puja awards for Durga Puja in Kolkata.

The Government of West Bengal introduced Biswa Bangla Sharad Samman in 2013.

=== Expansion ===
Reports in the Yugantar and Anandabazar Patrika provide a rough estimate of Sarbojanin (public) puja expenditure since the 1950s. In 1957, each community spent an average of ₹8,000 to ₹12,000 rupees at that time, the combined cost of the pujas was about ₹25 lakhs were; in 1984, that total increased to approximately ₹2 crores.

A Times of India report of 2012 provided a statistic on the expenditure on Durga puja in Kolkata during that season. According to the report, a total of ₹123.05 crores was spent on 3,577 pujas in Kolkata.

=== Durga puja carnival ===
Durga Puja Carnival started in Kolkata in 2016. The carnival was not organized in 2020 and 2021 due to COVID-19 pandemic. It was again organized from 2022.

=== Recognition of UNESCO ===
In 2019, Tapati Guha-Thakurta was entrusted with the task of preparing a dossier by the Indian Ministry of Culture. The dossier was submitted to UNESCO for the inclusion of Durga Puja in the UNESCO Representative List of the Intangible Cultural Heritage of Humanity. Representatives from various countries around the world evaluated the dossier at the 16th session, which began in Paris on 13 December 2021. "Durga Puja in Kolkata" got the Intangible Cultural Heritage status on 15 December 2021.

== The festival ==
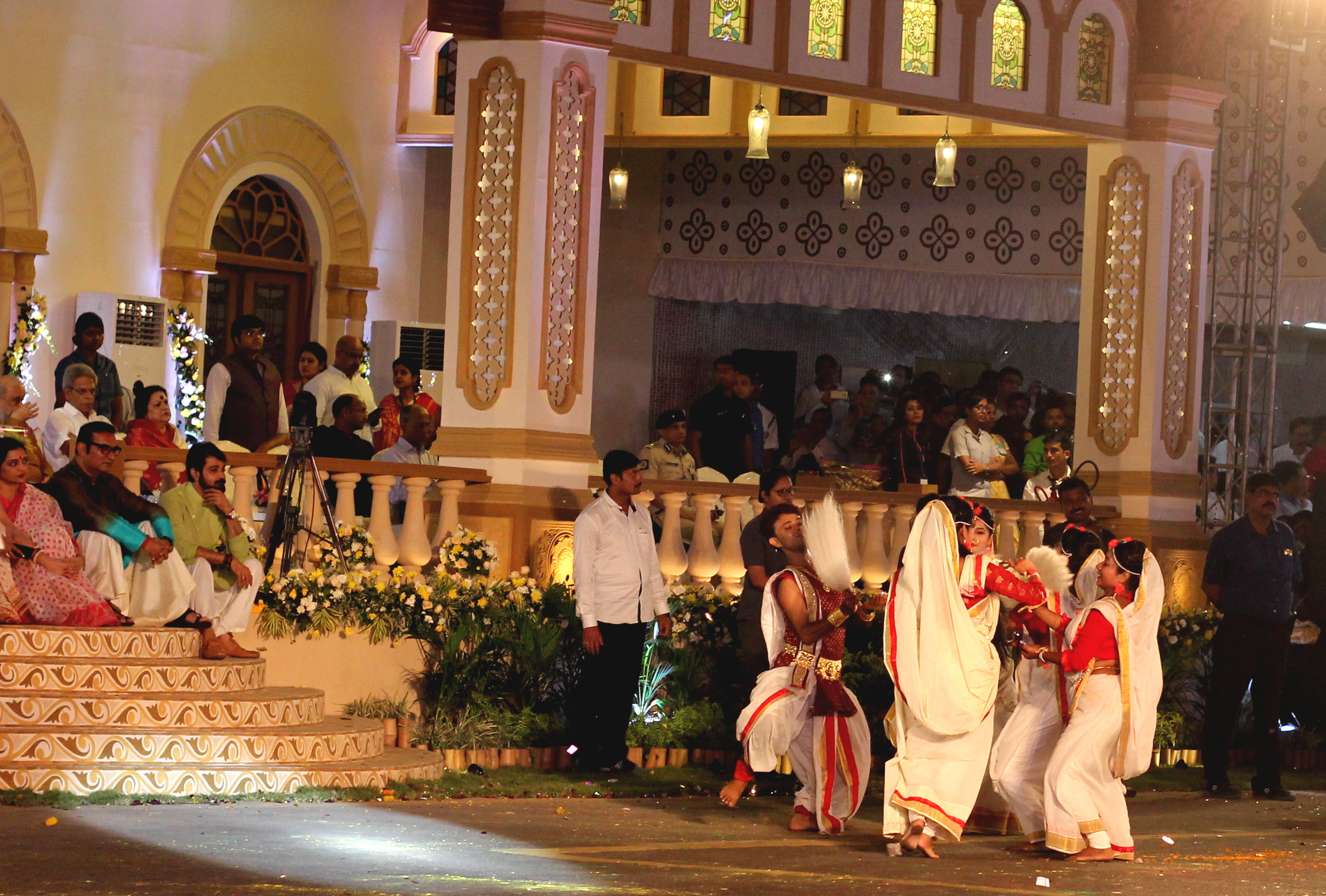
Dignitaries of Kolkata enjoying dance performance at Red road carnival

Durga Puja is mainly celebrated for 5 days – Shashti, Saptami, Ashtami, Navami and Vijaya Dashami. But the festive mood around Durga Puja in Kolkata starts before Shashti, mainly from Mahalaya. Durga Puja pandals are opened to the public from the day of Mahalaya. The main attractions of Durga Puja in Kolkata are the decorations, sculptures, pandals, lights and illuminations, and carnival.

== Evolution of puja ==
In the 17th century, pujas were organised by the zamindars in their rajbaris; today, the festival is associated with celebration. Considered a symbol of homecoming centered around the deity, the Puja features pandals, pandal hopping, various themes, and displays of lights.

Even till the 20th century also Kolkata's Durga Puja was primarily a religious and familial event, where different communities came together to worship her and partake in the age-old traditions associated with the festival. While the emotions, essence of devotion and community spirit still thrives, Durga Puja has undergone remarkable changes in terms of scale, style and cultural significance.

The most remarkable changes in the recent times include the exponential proliferation in the number of pujas across the city, an emphasis on creative art and an overwhelming crowd of people visiting the pandals every year. The city has witnessed a surge in the number of theme-based pujas over the years. The themes range from various artistic ideas, cultural traditions, famous monuments around the world and even biographies of famous persons.

Although centuries-old Rajbari pujas, with their Sobeki Protima and traditional established customs remain popular, theme based pujas have gained popularity in recent years, attracting large number of visitors annually. Due to ginormous number of people visiting pandals every year has led to overcrowding on the main five days, pandals are inaugurated from Mahalaya, much before Shashti. The magnification in the cost of expenditure has led the budget to be shifted from only chandas to advertisements and certain extent of government funding. Despite this changes, people have whole heartedly welcomed the new pinch to their age-old tradition and this festival has also turned out to be a melting pot of people from different religions, who enjoy the festivities.

== Government assistance ==
In 2018, CM Mamata Banerjee announced that every year ₹10,000 (US$137.91) will be given to 3000 puja committees in Kolkata and 25000 puja committees in the districts all over Bengal. The decision was opposed by the opposition parties. In response to a petition filed, the Calcutta High Court refused to interfere with the decision. Later, the Supreme Court of India refused to put a stay order on the incentives but asked the government to keep a record of the grants given.

In 2019, the amount was increased to ₹25,000 for each puja committee. Over the years, the amount has been increased to ₹50,000 in 2020 and ₹60,000−70,000 in 2022. In 2022, the total amount granted to all the pujas in that year alone stood at ₹258 crore. In 2024, the government increased the amount to ₹85,000 for each puja committee. The total amount was more than ₹365 crore for all the puja committees. The costs would include a 75% concession in the electricity bill for the committees. In 2025, the Government of West Bengal increased the assistance to ₹1,10,000 (US$1252.42) for each puja committee.

== Economy ==
A study - Mapping the Creative Economy around the Durga Puja - has been commissioned by the British Council on behalf of the Department of Tourism, Government of West Bengal. In 2021, the British Council in India mapped the creative economy of Durga Puja at ₹32,000 crores for the year 2019 and added that the festival contributed 2.58% of the GDP of West Bengal in financial year 2019–2020. "Durga Puja in Kolkata" contributes to a large part of this creative economy.

The economy of Durga Puja in Kolkata is divided into various sectors. Major among the various economic sectors are installation, art and decoration, Idol making, lighting and illumination, literature and publishing, sponsorship, advertising, retail, crafts and design (Puja Utensils), film and entertainment, and food and beverage. In 2019, Kolkata accounts for 15% share of pandal-making (installation, art and decoration) industry of West Bengal, worth ₹129 crores. Both the idol making industry and the lighting and lighting industry contributed ₹120 crores to Durga puja in Kolkata. In 2022, the collective economy of Durga Puja was around ₹40,000 crore and it created employment opportunities for three lakh people. By 2024, the economy stood around ₹50,000 crores.
