= Triangle (2019 film) =

2019 Bengali film

Triangle is a Bengali thriller-drama film directed by Anindya Sarkar. This film was released on 29 November 2019 under the banner of Baba Bhoothnath Entertainment. The film stars Kaushik Sen and Satabdi Chakraborty.

== Plot ==
The film revolves around a love triangle which changes the life of Rajdip Sen, a renowned corporate magnate and widower. He lives a lonely and simple life with the memories of his deceased wife Manju. Suddenly he becomes romantically involved with Tanaya Chatterjee, a beautiful TV anchor. Although Tanaya is the host of a health awareness show she is an alcoholic and addicted to a reckless life. Rajdip convinces and helps her back to a normal life and marries her. After a few days a stranger sends a series of letters to Rajdip which exposes some shocking truths about Tanaya. He finds out that Tanaya is having an extramarital affair.

== Cast ==
- Koushik Sen as Rajdip
- Biswanath Basu
- Pallavi Chatterjee
- Reshmi Bhattacharya as Tanaya
- Raj Bhattacharya
- Satabdi Chakraborty
- Ananya Sengupta
