= Pathikrit Basu =

Indian film director

- Born: Kolkata, West Bengal, India
- Education: Asutosh College
- Occupation: Film director
- Known for: Kachher Manush; Dabaru; Keu Bole Biplobi Keu Bole Dakat

Pathikrit Basu is a prominent Bengali film director known for his diverse storytelling and impactful contributions to Tollywood. His works traverse a wide range of genres, establishing him as a versatile and innovative filmmaker in the Bengali film industry.

== Filmography ==
Key
†	Denotes films that have not yet been released

=== Director ===
Year	Film title	Cast	Notes
2016	Haripada Bandwala	Ankush Hazra, Nusrat Jahan	Debut as director
2018	Total Dadagiri	Yash Dasgupta, Mimi Chakraborty	Based on Nenu Local
2018	Fidaa	Yash Dasgupta, Sanjana Banerjee	Based on Tholi Prema
2018	Teen Cup Chaa	Sayani Ghosh, Sourav Das	
2019	Ke Tumi Nandini	Bonny Sengupta, Rupsa Mukhopadhyay	Based on Ohm Shanthi Oshaana
2020	Dadur Kirti	Om Sahani, Ayoshi Talukdar	
2022	Kachher Manush	Prosenjit Chatterjee, Dev, Ishaa Saha	Loosely inspired from and a tribute to Jiban Kahini
2024	Dabaru	Arghya Basu Roy, Rituparna Sengupta, Chiranjeet Chakraborty, Dipankar De	Based on the early life of Surya Sekhar Ganguly
2024	Shastri	Mithun Chakraborty, Debashree Roy, Soham Chakraborty, Rajatava Dutta	
2025	Shreeman v/s Shreemati	Mithun Chakraborty, Anjan Dutt, Anjana Basu, Madhumita Sarcar, Parambrata Chatterjee	
2026	Keu Bole Biplobi Keu Bole Dakat	Jeet, Debattama Saha, Tota Roy Chowdhury, Rajatava Dutta, Mimi Chakraborty	Based on Historical event
TBA			Action Movie
