= Birpurush (drama) =

Birpurush is a 2010 Bengali drama staged by Kolkata-based theatre group Swapnasandhani and directed by Kaushik Sen.

== Plot ==
The drama is inspired by Rabindranath Tagore's poem Birpurush, it was not a children's play (though it was misinterpreted like that). The play had some amount of violence in it. The story was based on contemporary social and political condition of West Bengal. A wounded soldier and a Maoist get trapped in a forest and there they both claim to be Birpurush (brave man). There were some characters like 'Kishen Kanhaiya', 'Buddhadesh' and 'Monmohinidesh' which mocked real life personalities. In this play Kaushik Sen acted as himself and it is a self-critical character.

== Credits ==
=== Cast ===
- Kanchan Mullick
- Riddhi Sen
- Kaushik Sen

=== Crew ===
- Direction: Kaushik Sen
- Production: Swapnasandhani
- Inspired by: Birpurush of Rabindranath Tagore
- Script: Sumitro Bandyopadhyay

== See also ==
- Bohurupee
