= Shastri (2024 film) =

2024 Indian Bengali science fiction fantasy action film by Pathikrit Basu

- Theatrical release poster
- Directed by: Pathikrit Basu
- Based on: Dolgobindo Babur Chashmah by Debarati Mukhopadhyay
- Screenplay by: Aritra Banerjee; Additional screenplay Arnab Bhaumik
- Dialogues by: Arnab Bhaumik; Additional dialogue Aritra Banerjee
- Story by: Debarati Mukhopadhyay
- Produced by: Nispal Singh; Soham Chakraborty; Bajrang Lal Churiwala
- Starring: Mithun Chakraborty; Soham Chakraborty; Debashree Roy; Rajatava Dutta; Anirban Chakraborty; Saswata Chatterjee; Kaushik Sen; Sauraseni Maitra
- Cinematography: Gopi Bhagat
- Edited by: MD Kalam
- Music by: Songs: Indraadip Dasgupta Background score: Indraadip Dasgupta; Diptarka Bose
- Production companies: Surinder Films; Soham's Entertainment; Creative Solutions Pvt. Ltd.
- Distributed by: Surinder Films
- Release date: 8 October 2024
- Running time: 132 minutes
- Country: India
- Language: Bengali

Shastri (/ˈʃɑːstri/) is a 2024 Indian Bengali-language fantasy action comedy film directed by Pathikrit Basu. Produced by Soham Chakraborty, Nispal Singh and Bajrang Lal Churiwala under the banners of Surinder Films, Soham's Entertainment and Creative Solutions Pvt Ltd respectively, the film is based on Debarati Mukhopadhyay's short story Dolgobindo Babur Chashmah. It stars Mithun Chakraborty in the titular role, alongside an ensemble cast consisting of Soham Chakraborty, Debashree Roy, Rajatava Dutta, Anirban Chakraborty, Saswata Chatterjee, Kaushik Sen, Sauraseni Maitra and Ayush Das in pivotal roles. Delved into the theme of astrology versus science, the film plots Parimal, a factory worker, gets the power to see the future, changing his life's trajectory after facing massive hardships due to the sudden loss of his job. The film marked the comeback of Debasree Roy in Bengali cinema after a long hiatus.

The film was officially announced in October 2023, marking the twelfth collaboration between the pair Mithun Chakraborty and Debashree Roy. Principal photography commenced in February 2024, with filming taking place in Kolkata. The soundtrack and background score were composed by Indraadip Dasgupta, with the lyrics penned by Srijato. The screenplay of the film was written by Aritra Banerjee, while the dialogues were by Arnab Bhaumik, with cinematography handled by Gopi Bhagat and editing by MD. Kalam.

Shastri It was released theatrically on 8 October 2024 to positive reviews from critics, on the auspicious occasion of Durga Puja.

== Cast ==
- Mithun Chakraborty as Parimal "Shastri" Sanyal
- Soham Chakraborty as Saikat "Tubai" Majumder, an astrophysicist
- Debashree Roy as Sarala Sanyal, Parimal's wife
- Rajatava Dutta as Ramen Bagchi, a local leader
- Anirban Chakrabarti as Dipu, Parimal's friend
- Saswata Chatterjee as Madhab
- Kaushik Sen as Rabindranath "Rabi" Shastri, a fake astrologer
- Sauraseni Maitra as Anuradha, Saikat's love interest
- Ayush Das as Kaustav "Toton" Sanyal, Parimal and Sarala's son
- Vascar Dev as Mainak, Parimal's manager
- Rumki Chatterjee as Tubai's mother

=== Special appearance ===
- Kanchan Mallick as Gautam Kundu, a chit fund businessman
- Ambarish Bhattacharya as Kaushik Dasgupta, Ramen's opposition leader
- Abhijit Guha as Nitai Laha, the owner of Laha Builders
- Keya Seth as herself

== Production ==
=== Development ===
During the promotion of Kachher Manush (2022), in an interview it was revealed by Pathikrit Basu that he was eager to direct Mithun Chakraborty in a film for a long time. He had previously mentioned his admiration of Chakraborty's work, noting the actor's films Mrigayaa (1976) and Tahader Katha (1992). During the post-production of Basu's next Dabaru (2024), Soham Chakraborty's production house Soham's Entertainment signed him to direct a film for the studio. Then both Soham and Basu chose a short story named Dolgobindo Babur Chashmah written by Debarati Mukhopadhyay, which itself was a part of Mukhopadhyay's book Nirbachito 42. Both of them narrated the script to Mithun Chakraborty in July 2023. After making some changes in the script as per his instructions, Chakraborty agreed to sign the film.

The film's official announcement poster was released on 16 October 2023, having Mithun Chakraborty's voice reciting some lines from Rabindranath Tagore's devotional poem Bhakti Bhajan, in which the film's title was revealed to be Shastri.

=== Pre-production ===
Surinder Films and Creative Solution Pvt Ltd were revealed to be the co-producers of the film in November 2023. Both Soham Chakraborty and Pathikrit Basu chose Indraadip Dasgupta as the music director of the film. Cinematographer Gopi Bhagat was included as a part of the crew members. Pathikrit Basu retained some of the crew members from his previous films, which included screenwriter Aritra Banerjee (who runs a YouTube channel named Aritra's Gyan), and editor MD Kalam both of whom worked with him in Dabaru, and dialogue writer Arnab Bhaumik, who worked with him in Kachher Manush. Both Banerjee and Bhaumik felt that one of the main challenges was spending a month to come up with the idea for the interval and climax sequence in a specific manner, where Mithun Chakraborty would be portrayed as a cool demeanor and also would have been observed to perform a high-octane action sequence respectively; and also setting the character to be more interesting, a contrast from Chakraborty's films. They added that Chakraborty will be also felicitated in the film through some memorable dialogues delivered by himself from his previous blockbusters Guru (2003), MLA Fatakeshto (2006), Abhimanyu (2006), Tulkalam (2007) and Ami Subhash Bolchhi (2011).

Prior to the commencement of the first schedule, the team constructed a set at the NT-1 Studio in Kolkata, where major portions were being planned to be predominantly shot there Test shoots for the film took place in late January 2024 at Chennai. Prominent make-up artist Somnath Kundu designed the looks and character sketches for Mithun Chakraborty.

=== Casting ===
In October 2023, Debashree Roy was revealed to be the female lead opposite Mithun Chakraborty, reuniting with him after 16 years since Tiger (2007), despite working in Shukno Lanka later where they were not observed to be a pair. That October month, Rajatava Dutta was reported to be a major part of the film, marking his 9th film with Chakraborty after Le Halua Le (2012). Besides, Soham Chakraborty was also revealed to play the role of an astrophysicist in the film, promising that Pathikrit Basu would create a new kind of magic with the entire starcast. In January 2024, Sauraseni Maitra was reported to be a part of the film, pairing up with him. The same month, other cast members were revealed officially by the makers including Kaushik Sen (in his second collaboration with Basu after Dabaru), Anirban Chakraborty and Saswata Chatterjee in a pivotal roles; with Ambarish Bhattacharya, Kanchan Mallick and Abhijit Guha in a cameo appearances. Rumour was that Kharaj Mukherjee might be seen in a vital role opposite Chakraborty, but it proved wrong when he denied the information.

=== Filming ===
The mahurat puja for the film held on 31 January 2024 and Principal photography commenced on 1 February in Kolkata. During an early schedule on 10 February, Mithun Chakraborty suffered severe chest pain during the shooting and nearly collapsed. He was admitted into the ITU of Apollo Gleneagles Hospital off EM Bypass at around 10:30 am and later underwent MRI and was treated by a neuromedicine specialist. There Prosenjit Chatterjee, Dev, Raj Chakraborty, Samik Bhattacharya and also the cast members from Shastri including Debashree Roy, Soham Chakraborty, Pathikrit Basu and Rajatava Dutta came to visit him. Basu further divulged that Mithun Chakraborty also discussed the things he wanted to do, once he is back on the sets, despite his illness. Praising Chakraborty's dedication to acting, Basu added that while lying in the hospital bed, Chakraborty till then discussed with Basu about the shooting being cancelled due to his sudden illness.

After being discharged on 12 February, Mithun Chakraborty joined the cast members during the second schedule of the film on 19 February. On 22 February, director Madhur Bhandarkar came to meet Chakraborty also visiting the sets of the film. According to cinematographer Gopi Bhagat, a set resembling an ashram was constructed for the of devotional workplace of Shastri where devotionally people would gather to meet him, and where most of the film's second half is set. On that month, Saswata Chatterjee joined the film's shooting schedule. The song "Dhangkurakur Taak" featuring Chakraborty, Soham Chakraborty and Maitra was filmed at this schedule on the premises of Behala Debdaru Fatak Club on 1 March 2024. Afterwards, the team moved to Nonapukur for filming a brief schedule mainly with Mithun Chakraborty, Debashree Roy, Anirban Chakraborty and Ayush Das. This schedule concluded on 10 May 2024.^{[70]}

After a brief break, a major sequence was filmed featuring Chakraborty, Rajatava Dutta and Soham Chakraborty at the NT-1 Studio on 23 May 2024. A week later, the team commenced filming a major action sequence of the climax between Mithun Chakraborty and Soham Chakraborty. By the end of the month, it was reported that only 20 days of shooting is to be completed, with scenes featuring Mithun Chakraborty to be canned within 15 days. Some sequences featuring Soham Chakraborty and Sauraseni Mitra were shot at Salt Lake. Some major action sequences featuring Mithun Chakraborty were shot in this schedule, with some indoor sequences between Kaushik Sen and Chakraborty and was completed on 4 July 2024, which meant that principal photography has been wrapped.

=== Post production ===
Post-production began on mid-June 2024, with Mithun Chakraborty dubbing his portions for the film first, after his commitments for filming Shontaan (2024). The same month, Debashree Roy and Rajatava Dutta dubbed their respective portions.

== Soundtrack ==
All lyrics are written by Srijato; all music is composed by Indraadip Dasgupta.

No.	Title	Singer(s)	Length
1.	"Hey Shastri"	Aneek Dhar	2:44
2.	"Dhangkurakur Taak"	Abhijeet Bhattacharya, Antara Mitra, Ishan Mitra	4:08
3.	"Laag Bhelki"	Surojit Chatterjee	3:41
Total length:			10:33

== Marketing ==
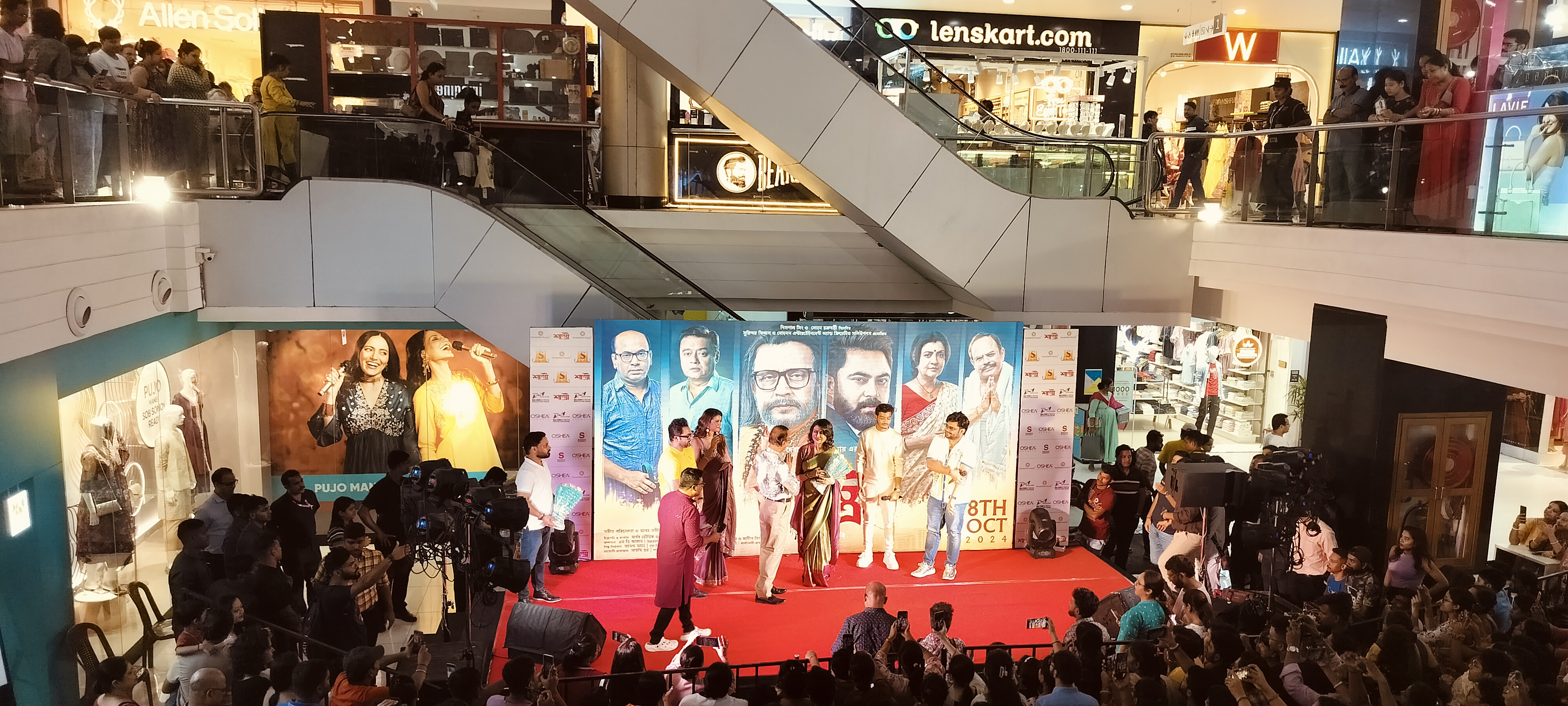
Soham Chakraborty, Sauraseni Maitra and Debasree Roy at Diamond Plaza with regard to the promotion of the film

On 1 February 2024, a poster that revealed the film's official release date was unveiled by the makers. The first look poster was released on 7 September on the occasion of Ganesh Chaturthi. A motion poster was released on 17 September featuring Mithun Chakraborty and Soham Chakraborty who symbolize the rivalry between astrology and astrophysics respectively. On 23 September, the film's trailer was released with a trailer launch event at PVR Mani Square.

== Release ==
The film was released in the theatres on 8 October 2024, on the occasion of Durga Puja.

== Reception ==
Suparna Majumder of Sangbad Pratidin reviewed the film and wrote "No one else could have played this character better than Mithun." he praised the acting, the chemistry and emotions between the lead but criticized the unnecessary songs.

Debolina Ghosh of Ei Samay rated the film 3.5 out of 5 stars and praised Pathikrit's direction, Mithun's performance, acting of the other cast, the music and the cinematography.

Debarshi Bandyopadhyay of Anandabazar Patrika rated the film 7 out of 10 stars and wrote "The film depicts a battle between astrology and logic." He praised the acting of the whole cast. He said Mithun was the best choice for this role but his eyes were not expressive enough at certain instances.
