= Rupe Tomay Bholabo Na =

- Theatrical release poster
- Directed by: Raj Mukherjee
- Screenplay by: Raj Mukherjee
- Story by: Raj Mukherjee
- Produced by: Arjun Bhowmik
- Starring: Swastika Mukherjee; Kaushik Sen; Soumitra Chatterjee
- Cinematography: Sandip Sen
- Edited by: Tapas Chakraborty
- Music by: Piloo Bhattacharya
- Release date: 22 February 2013 (Kolkata)
- Country: India
- Language: Bengali

Rupe Tomae Bholabo Na (Bengali: রূপে তোমায় ভোলাব না) is Bengali film released on 22 February 2013. The film is directed by Raj Mukherjee and it revolves around a star actress and her daughter reflecting their psycho conflict. The film features an ensemble cast including Anannya Sarkar as Ritu, Swastika Mukheree as Kaberi and Shaan as Sunny. It also stars Kaushik Sen as Indrajeet, and Soumitra Chatterjee.

== Plot ==
The story revolves around the psychological and mental conflicts faced by women, the root of which lies in the socioeconomic conditions of modern-day society. It is a love triangle based film but not a normal one. A star actress Kaberi (Swastika Mukherjee), her Ritu (Ananya Sarkar) and daughter's boyfriend Sunny (Shaan Roy) – love triangle between these three characters has been shown in this film. This film shows that how the relationship between the mother & daughter goes when both of them got attracted to one man (Sunny). It shows the human psychology & crisis of recent days where a girl feels that her mother is physically more attractive than her. Kaberi is a famous actress of recent times. Indrajeet (Kaushik Sen), husband of Kaberi is a corporate man. Ritu is the daughter of Kaberi and Indrajeet. Ritu is doing her graduation in science. Ritu suffers from identity crisis due to her mother's stardom. In the meantime, Ritu falls in love with her classmate Sunny, who is a boy from a village. But later, Sunny becomes the boyfriend of Kaberi. When Kaberi gets to know about Ritu & Sunny's relationship, she accepted it gladly. One day Kaberi met Sunny in a restaurant. Sunny told Kaberi that he had a dream to become an actor. Kaberi was impressed with her would be son in law. Kaberi started helping Sunny so that he can become an actor in future. As time passed, Sunny & Kaberi both get to know each other more. Age difference between Ritu and Kaberi was not very high. Ritu started suspecting her mother as she thought that Kaberi was becoming involved with Sunny and then twists & turns started happening in their lives.

== Cast ==
- Soumitra Chatterjee as Dr. Arindam Sen
- Anannya Sarkar as Rituparna "Ritu" Mukherjee
- Kaushik Sen as Indrajeet Mukherjee
- Swastika Mukherjee as Kaberi Mukherjee
- Shaan Roy as Swarnadeep "Sunny" Chakraborty
- Piloo Bhattacharya

== Crew ==
- Music director: Piloo Bhattacharya
- Lyrics: Prabir Kundu, Piloo Bhattacharya

== Soundtrack ==
- "Asbe Tumi Ei Kothati" - Sujoy Bhowmik
- "Boroloker Beti Lo" - Piloo Bhattacharya
