= Inspector Nalinikanta =

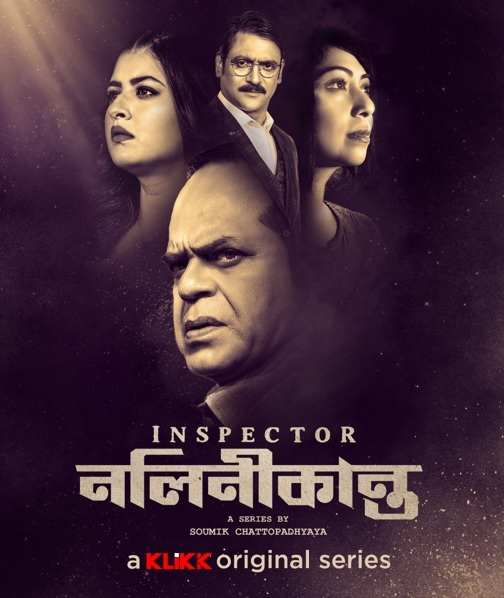
- Genre: Thriller, Suspense
- Story by: Ayan Bhattacharya
- Directed by: Soumik Chattopadhyaya
- Starring: Rajatava Dutta; Subrat Dutta; Rupsha Chatterjee; Mishka Halim
- Country of origin: India
- Original language: Bengali
- No. of seasons: 1
- No. of episodes: 7

Production
- Producer: Arkadia Entertainment LLP Production
- Cinematography: Saurav Banerjee, Pramit Das

Original release
- Release: 17 November 2022

Inspector Nalinikanta is a 2022 Indian Bengali language crime, thriller and Suspense web series directed by Soumik Chattopadhyaya. The series is written by Ayan Bhattacharya.

The main cast of the series is Rajatava Dutta, Subrat Dutta, Rupsha Chatterjee and Mishka Halim.

== Plot ==
The plot revolves around renowned cosmetic surgeon Dr Aditya Sen of Kolkata, who is having an adulterous affair with one of his patients, Nisha. Surprisingly, on his 15th wedding anniversary, he suspects that his wife Sharmila is also having an affair. Meanwhile, Sharmila discovers that Nisha is more than Aditya's patient. And now for the twist. Nisha assists the doctor in his scheme to assassinate Sharmila. Sharmila was attacked at home one night, and it appears to be a burglary. Inspector Nalinikanta begins his inquiry and quickly realises there is more to this crime.

== Cast ==
- Rajatava Dutta
- Subrat Dutta
- Rupsha Chatterjee
- Mishka Halim
- Chhandak Choudhury

== Reception ==
IMDb gave it 8.5 out of 10 ratings.

== Episodes ==
No.	Title	Directed by	Original release date
1	"Belonging of Trophy Husband"	Soumik Chattopadhyaya	17 November 2022
Who is Aditya's owner? How will he resurrect himself? What action does he take to respond to the charges that he has the potential to be an ideal career holder?
2	"Don't Panic"	Soumik Chattopadhyaya	17 November 2022
Aditya devised and carried out a detailed plot against Sharmila. Meanwhile, Nisha is always terrified. What lies next for Aditya?
3	"How Murder Looks Alike?"	Soumik Chattopadhyaya	17 November 2022
On the floor, conduct an investigation. Sharmila and Aditya's secrets are being disclosed in a spiral. Meanwhile, Sharmila awakens from her coma. Will she be able to track out the criminal?
4	"Doppelganger"	Soumik Chattopadhyaya	17 November 2022
Nalini Kundu, an investigating officer, solves the riddle by connecting the dots with the existence of a lookalike. It also casts doubt on the husband. What comes next?
5	"Not A Regular Inspector"	Soumik Chattopadhyaya	17 November 2022
Inspector Nalini Kundu and his aide conduct a more detailed inspection based on important assumptions. The light interrogation with Nisha leads to the unravelling of the murder mystery and the next target of suspicion.
6	"Fear Faith"	Soumik Chattopadhyaya	17 November 2022
According to the protracted investigation, the conspiracies behind the murder are becoming clearer. While the primary suspect tries to flee the inspector, inspector Nalini successfully manipulates Nisha against Dr. Sen.
7	"Cleaning Hand"	Soumik Chattopadhyaya	17 November 2022
Change the game Inspector Nalini causes havoc between Nisha and Dr. Sen and eventually gains Nisha's trust. Finally, when Nisha tries to flee, the police arrive and discover the key evidence against the perpetrator.
