= Din Ratrir Golpo =

2020 Indian Bengali film

- Theatrical release poster
- Directed by: Prosenjit Choudhury
- Written by: Prosenjit Choudhury; Supriti Choudhury
- Screenplay by: Prosenjit Choudhury; Supriti Choudhury
- Produced by: Supriti Choudhury
- Starring: Supriti Choudhury; Rajatava Dutta; Pradip Mukherjee; Rukmini Chatterjee; Sourav Chatterjee; Rayati Bhattacheryee
- Cinematography: Mrinmoy Mandol
- Edited by: Pradip Das
- Music by: Santanu Dutta
- Release date: 28 February 2020
- Running time: 120 minutes
- Country: India
- Language: Bengali

Din Ratrir Golpo is a 2020 Indian Bengali language space fiction film directed by Prosenjit Choudhury and produced by Supriti Choudhury. It stars Supriti Choudhury, Rajatava Dutta, Pradip Mukherjee, Rukmini Chatterjee, Sourav Chatterjee and Rayati Bhattacheryee. The film was released theatrically on 28 February 2020.

== Cast ==
- Supriti Choudhury
- Rajatava Dutta
- Pradip Mukherjee
- Rukmini Chatterjee
- Sourav Chatterjee
- Rayati Bhattacheryee

== Promotion and release ==
The official trailer of the film was launched by producers on 10 January 2020.

The film was released theatrically on 28 February 2020.
