= Banchha Elo Phire =

- Directed by: Amitabha Pathak Image. _
- Screenplay by: Amitabha Pathak
- Story by: Amitabha Pathak
- Produced by: Anindya Sen Gupta, Soumen Mukherjee, Toton Das
- Starring: Madhabi Mukherjee, Paran Banerjee, Pradip Bhattacharya, Biplab Chatterjee, Sumit Samaddar, Mausumi Bhattacharya, Shantilal Mukherjee, Rajatava Dutta, Bobby Chakaborty, Mantu Mallik, Pallavi Chatterjee, Deepankar De, June Malia
- Music by: Gora & Som
- Release date: 21 October 2016
- Country: India
- Language: Bengali

Banchha Elo Phire is a Bengali comedy film. It was released on 21 October 2016.

== Plot ==
The film follows Bancharam, an old man who is at risk of losing his land to developers who want to build a national highway. His grandson, Guneswar, is all for selling the land, despite his grandfather's wishes. Unfortunately for Bancharam, he dies and his spirit visits Zamindar Narahari Dutta in order to ask for help.

== Cast ==
Actor(s)
Madhabi Mukherjee
Paran Banerjee
Pradip Bhattacharya
Biplab Chatterjee
Sumit Samaddar
Mausumi Bhattacharya
Shantilal Mukherjee
Rajatava Dutta
Bobby Chakaborty
Mantu Mallik
Pallavi Chatterjee
Deepankar De
June Malia

== Songs ==
| Track | Title | Singer | Duration |
|---|---|---|---|
| 01 | Bose Thaki Eka Ghore | Manorama & Sudipto | 04:03 |
| 02 | Sahure Maiya | Poulomi & Sudipta | 04:49 |
| 03 | Porechi Tomai Jware | Anvesha & Raj | 05:02 |
| 04 | Porechi Tomai Jware | Anvesha & Raj | 05:02 |
