= Kolkata Full Marathon =

Marathon in Kolkata, West Bengal, India

- 2017 logo of Kolkata Full Marathon
- Date: Early February
- Location: Kolkata, India
- Distance: Marathon, Half-Marathon, 10K
- Primary sponsor: AgeasFederal Life Insurance
- Established: 2008
- Course records: Men: 2:19:30 (India) Satya Prakash (2014); Women: 3:16:56 (India) Anjali Saraogi (2019)
- Website: Kolkata Marathon
- Participants: ≈6,000 participants (2022); 841 (2019)

The Kolkata Full Marathon (officially IDBI Federal Life Insurance Kolkata Full Marathon) is a marathon held annually in Kolkata, West Bengal, India. It was launched in 2008. The marathon is the largest in Eastern India and the only full marathon held in Kolkata.

== Organisation ==
"The moment they approached me for the event, I said, yes. Kolkata has a special place in my heart as I have spent many formative years of my life here. To see the event grow from the first edition to the ninth edition, in terms of participation and even awareness in the city has been an interesting journey."

— Leander Paes after becoming Brand Ambassador of 2016 edition of the marathon

The marathon is authorised by the Athletics Federation of India (AFI). For 2016 edition IDBI Federal Life Insurance will be the title sponsors of the marathon. The marathon is managed by the HighLife Management. The 2016 marathon will also be an official qualifier round for the marathon events in the Rio Olympics 2016.

IDBI Federal Life Insurance is the title sponsor for 2017 edition of the race. Indian cricket player Sachin Tendulkar is the Brand Ambassador for the 2017 marathon.

== Participants ==
The race has five categories of competition. Along with the traditional full and half marathon distances, there is also a 10 km open run, 10 km corporate run and 5 km fun run for children. In the first edition of the marathon, nearly 6,000 runners participated; the number of runners increased to 15,000 in 2015. Only Indian athletes are eligible for the prize money; according to organisers, the aims of the marathon are to provide a platform for Indian competitors and to promote athletics at the grass-root level in India. In 2015, the prize money for the winner of the full marathon was ₹3.2 lakh (US$3,400), while 2nd and 3rd finishers were awarded ₹1.6 lakh (US$1,700) and ₹0.8 lakh (US$850) respectively.

== Course ==
The marathon starts from the Red Road in front of the Rangers club. The course then goes through the various landmarks in the city, including historic Park Street, Maidan and the Victoria area.

== Past winners ==
Key: Course record Half marathon

Edition	Year	Men's winner	Time (h:m:s)	Women's winner	Time (h:m:s)
1st	2008	Bhairon Singh (IND)	2:20:53	Winner not available	Time not available
2nd	2009	Binning Lyngkhoi (IND)	2:21:07	Winner not available	Time not available
3rd	2010	Binning Lyngkhoi (IND)	2:20:49	Winner not available	Time not available
—	2011	Did not held			
—	2012	Did not held			
—	2013	Did not held			
4th	2014	Satya Prakash (IND)	2:19:30	Winner not available	Time not available
5th	2015	Laljee Yadav (IND)	2:25:54	Winner not available	Time not available
6th	2016	Mohammad Yunus (IND)	2:30:35	Winner not available	Time not available
7th	2017	Abul Hossain (IND)	2:34:02	Pooja Jain (IND)	4:59:11
8th	2018	Akhil Verma (IND)	2:35:10	Rashmi Somani (IND)	4:19:36
9th	2019	Tlanding Wahlang (IND)	2:35:42	Anjali Saraogi (IND)	3:16:56
10th	2020	Awadh Yadav (IND)	2:30:30	Anjali Saraogi (IND)	3:24:02
11th	2021	Dulu Sarkar (IND)	2:37:44	Phurba Tamang (IND)	3:58:02
12th	2022	Rupan Debnath (IND)	2:42:42	Tamali Basu (IND)	4:01:16
13th	2024	Prasant Ropal (IND)	2:45:53	Phurba Tamang (IND)	3:22:39
14th	2026	Palash Hazra (IND)	2:33:14	Samjana Subba (IND)	3:07:03
