= Shreeman v/s Shreemati =

2025 Indian Bengali film

Shreeman Vs Shreemati
- Shreeman Vs Shreemati Official Poster
- Directed by: Pathikrit Basu
- Written by: Aritra Banerjee
- Screenplay by: Aritra Banerjee
- Dialogues by: Arpan Gupta
- Produced by: Adipta Majumder
- Starring: Mithun Chakraborty; Anjan Dutt; Parambrata Chattopadhyay; Madhumita Sarcar; Anjana Basu; Biswanath Basu; Satyam Bhattacharya; Roshni Bhattacharya; Tanima Sen
- Cinematography: Gopi Bhagat
- Edited by: Sujoy Dutta Roy
- Music by: Indraadip Dasgupta
- Production company: Kahhak Studios
- Distributed by: PVR Inox Pictures
- Release date: 1 May 2025
- Running time: 130 minutes
- Country: India
- Language: Bengali

Shreeman Vs Shreemati (/ʃriːman viː ɛs ʃriːmati/) is a 2025 Indian Bengali-language legal comedy-drama film directed by Pathikrit Basu. Produced by Adipta Majumder under the banner of Kahhak Studios, the film draws inspiration from India’s longest-running divorce case. It stars for the first time Mithun Chakraborty and Anjan Dutt together, along with Anjana Basu in the lead roles, while Parambrata Chatterjee and Madhumita Sarcar play other pivotal roles. The film premiered theatrically in India on 1 May 2025.

== Plot ==
Justice Amal Chowdhury, a judge notorious for refusing divorce petitions, challenges quarreling couple Sourav (Parambrata Chattopadhyay) and Amrita (Madhumita Sarcar) to swap roles for one week. During this exercise, they discover Amal's own 27-year marriage dispute with his wife Aparna. The couple then works to reunite the older pair, complicated by the arrival of Aparna's former college love Niloy Sen (Anjan Dutt). The narrative explores contrasting generational approaches to marriage through parallel storylines, highlighting how younger couples navigate relationships differently than older generations.

== Cast ==
- Mithun Chakraborty as Justice Amal Chowdhury
- Anjana Basu as Aparna Chowdhury
- Anjan Dutt as Niloy Sen
- Parambrata Chattopadhyay as Sourav
- Madhumita Sarcar as Amrita
- Roshni Bhattacharyya as Young Aparna
- Biswanath Basu as Sakkhigopal
- Satyam Bhattacharya as Young Amal
- Raj Chakraborty as himself (cameo)

== Production ==
=== Development ===
Director Pathikrit Basu conceived the project after learning about India's longest-running divorce case, aiming to explore marital relationships through comedic lens. The film marks the historic first collaboration between Bengali cinema icons Mithun Chakraborty and Anjan Dutt, who both began their careers with Mrinal Sen's films. Basu intentionally cast Chakraborty against type to explore his versatility in romantic roles.

=== Filming ===
Principal photography commenced in September 2024 in Kolkata, featuring extensive location shooting in North Kolkata neighborhoods. Cinematographer Gopi Bhagat employed distinctive visual treatments for different timelines: nostalgic black-and-white for flashbacks and warm tones for present-day sequences.

== Soundtrack ==
Shreeman Vs Shreemati

Soundtrack album by Indraadip Dasgupta Anjan Dutt Silajit Majumder
- Released: 10 April 2025
- Genre: Feature film soundtrack
- Length: 17:22
- Language: Bengali
- Label: Times Music Bangla

Track listing
No.	Title	Lyrics	Music	Singer(s)	Length
1.	"Dao Ulu Dao"	Barish	Indraadip Dasgupta	Papon; Shreya Ghoshal	4:18
2.	"Ami Phirechi Ghore"	Ritam Sen	Indraadip Dasgupta	Imon Chakraborty; Rupankar Bagchi	2:34
3.	"Mon Kharap"	Barish	Indraadip Dasgupta	Sonu Nigam; Antara Mitra	4:51
4.	"Boyosh Bere Jay Sokoler"	Anjan Dutt	Anjan Dutt	Anjan Dutt	3:03
5.	"Durotto"	Silajit Majumder	Silajit Majumder	Silajit Majumder; Sanchari Sengupta	3:16
Total length:					17:22

The soundtrack received particular acclaim for Anjan Dutt's nostalgic composition "Boyosh Bere Jay Sokoler", which critics noted recalled his earlier musical style in films like Ranjana.

== Release ==
=== Marketing ===
The teaser poster launched in November 2024 featured stylized illustrations of the lead actors amid legal documents. The official trailer debuted on 29 April 2025 at a Kolkata event attended by numerous Tollywood celebrities, highlighting the film's comedic moments and veteran star power. Marketing emphasized the historic pairing of Chakraborty and Dutt, with social media campaigns using #MithunVsAnjan.

=== Theatrical run ===
Originally scheduled for 10 April 2025, the release was postponed to 1 May 2025 to avoid competition with Srijit Mukherjee's Killbill Society and Gopichand Malineni's Jaat during the Pohela Boishakh weekend. The film premiered in Kolkata on 30 April 2025, attended by the cast and industry personalities.

== Reception ==
=== Critical response ===
Poorna Banerjee from Times Of India gave a 3 out 5 star review to this film and stated that Films like Projapati may have sparked Tollywood’s late-age-marriage trend, and Shreeman Vs Shreemati captures it with extra charm and humour.The first half dazzles with witty dialogue, meta-jokes and a retro '70s ambiance, although the reason for Amal and Aparna’s split feels thin. The second half leans heavily on slapstick—some effective, some excessive—and a rushed finale that undercuts its emotional payoff. Veteran performances (especially Chakraborty’s gravitas and Basu’s comic timing), Anjan Dutt’s standout song and Gopi Bhagat’s nostalgic cinematography make it an endearing, feel-good summer comedy – despite a few pacing hiccups.

Radio jockey Animesh (8/10) praised it as "a historic moment for Bengali cinema" with "electric chemistry between legends," calling it "more than a rom-com – a cultural event."

Independent reviewer Arko Bhowmik observed: "The film balances slapstick and emotional depth effortlessly, with Roshni Bhattacharyya's portrayal of young Aparna being a revelation," though noting "the final resolution feels somewhat rushed."
