= Durga Puja Carnival =

Annual event in Kolkata, India

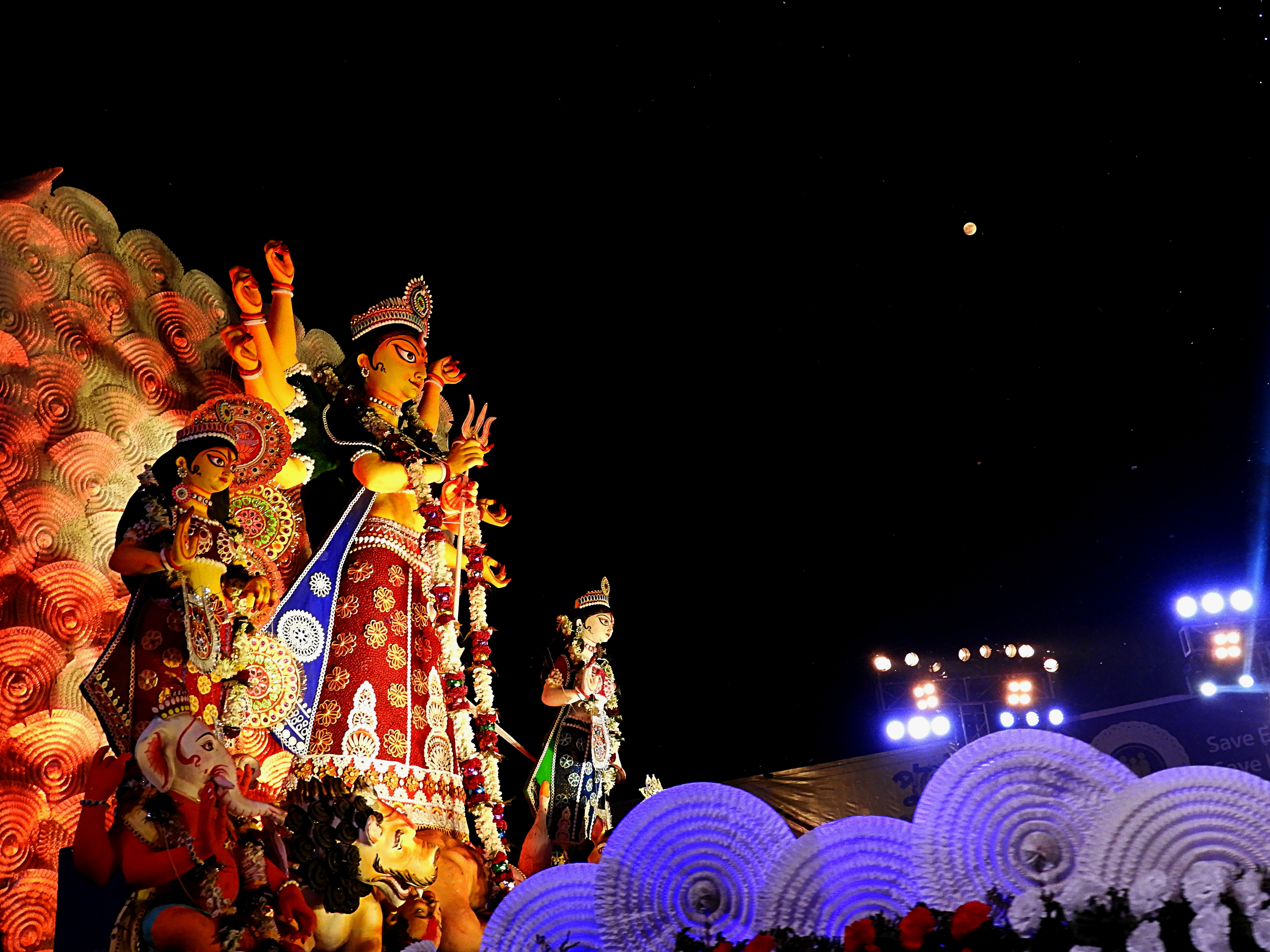
- Status: Discontinued
- Genre: Cultural Festival
- Frequency: Annual
- Locations: Indira Gandhi Sarani, Kolkata, West Bengal, India
- Years active: 2016–2025
- Participants: Durga Puja Committees, cultural performers
- Attendance: Hundreds of thousands of locals and tourists

The Durga Puja Carnival also known as Kolkata Carnival, held annually, was an extension of the Durga Puja festivities in Kolkata, West Bengal. It celebrated the cultural heritage of the city, bringing together diverse communities through processions, performances, and thematic events. Initiated by the West Bengal Government, it had evolved as a large public event showcasing art, music, dance, and traditional Bengali culture.

== History ==
The Kolkata Carnival started in 2017 as a post-Durga Puja procession to showcase the artistic creations and cultural diversity of the city. It was an initiative of the West Bengal Government to turn Kolkata's renowned Durga Puja into a larger cultural extravaganza. The event features decorated tableaux from the city's Durga Puja pandals, accompanied by cultural performances, floats, and musical events. It symbolizes the essence of the Bengali community's love for art, inclusivity, and celebrations.

== Events and Activities ==
The Carnival was a visual spectacle, with floats from various Durga Puja committees parading through the streets. Artists, musicians, and dancers perform during the procession, depicting the cultural vibrancy of West Bengal. Some key activities include:

- Puja Tableaux Parade: Featuring top Durga Puja pandals with intricately designed idols and decorations.
- Cultural Performances: Traditional dance forms like Dhunuchi Naach (dancing with incense burners) and musical performances highlighting Bengali folk music.
- Art Installations: Showcasing Bengal's handicrafts, artisanship, and creative industries.

Each year, the Carnival grew in scale, with hundreds of thousands attending to enjoy the cultural performances and revelry.

== Significance ==
The Kolkata Carnival served as a platform to celebrate the spirit of Durga Puja, which was inscribed as UNESCO Intangible Cultural Heritage in 2021. It extended the festivities of Durga Puja, highlighting the communal harmony, creativity, and inclusivity that the festival stands for. The event also brought in significant economic benefits, boosting local businesses, tourism, and the city's economy during the festive season.

== Government Involvement ==
The West Bengal Government has played a crucial role in organizing the event, with Chief Minister Mamata Banerjee actively promoting it as a global cultural event. Financial incentives are given to Puja committees for participation, and the event is heavily promoted as part of the state's tourism drive. From 2026, the Carnival is cancelled by the new state BJP Government. A mega event is being planned in Eden Gardens on Mahalaya.

== See also ==
- Durga Puja
- UNESCO Intangible Cultural Heritage Lists
