= Madam Sengupta =

2025 Indian Bengali thriller film

- Theatrical release poster
- Directed by: Sayantan Ghosal
- Screenplay by: Sougata Basu
- Story by: Sougata Basu
- Produced by: Pradip Kumar Nandy
- Starring: Rituparna Sengupta; Rahul Bose; Kaushik Sen; Subrat Dutta; Paran Bandopadhyay
- Cinematography: Tuban
- Edited by: Subhajit Singha
- Music by: Indraadip Dasgupta (score); Anupam Roy
- Production company: Nandy Movies
- Distributed by: Nandy Movies Production
- Release date: 4 July 2025
- Running time: 130 minutes
- Country: India
- Language: Bengali

Madam Sengupta is a 2025 Indian Bengali-language neo-noir action thriller film directed by Sayantan Ghosal. The film was released on 4 July 2025 under the banner of Nandy Movie Productions.

== Plot ==
The theme of the movie reflects Sukumar Ray's classic satirical works Abol Tabol. Anurekha, a distinguished cartoonist comes to Kolkata searching the secret behind her daughter Ananya's murder. The film revolves with the hidden political rivalries, conspiracies, love and betrayals.

== Cast ==
- Rituparna Sengupta as Anurekha Sengupta, a renowned cartoonist
- Indrani Bhattacharyya as Ananya Sengupta, Anurekha's daughter
- Rahul Bose as Ranjan Banerjee
- Kaushik Sen as Satyaki Sen, Anurekha's husband
- Ananya Chatterjee as Yashodhara Banerjee, the main antagonist, would be Cultural Minister
- Paran Bandopadhyay as Jadu Babu
- Kharaj Mukherjee as Laltu Da
- Santilal Mukherjee as OC Tapan Bagchi
- Subrat Dutta as Haren Mondal, corrupt police officer
- Debapriyo Mukherjee as Badshah
- Sudip Mukherjee as Bilash Chowdhury
- Ratan Sarkhel as opposition leader Amartya Chatterjee, would be Chief Minister
