= Kaushik Sen =

Bengali film and television actor (born 1968)

Koushik Sen
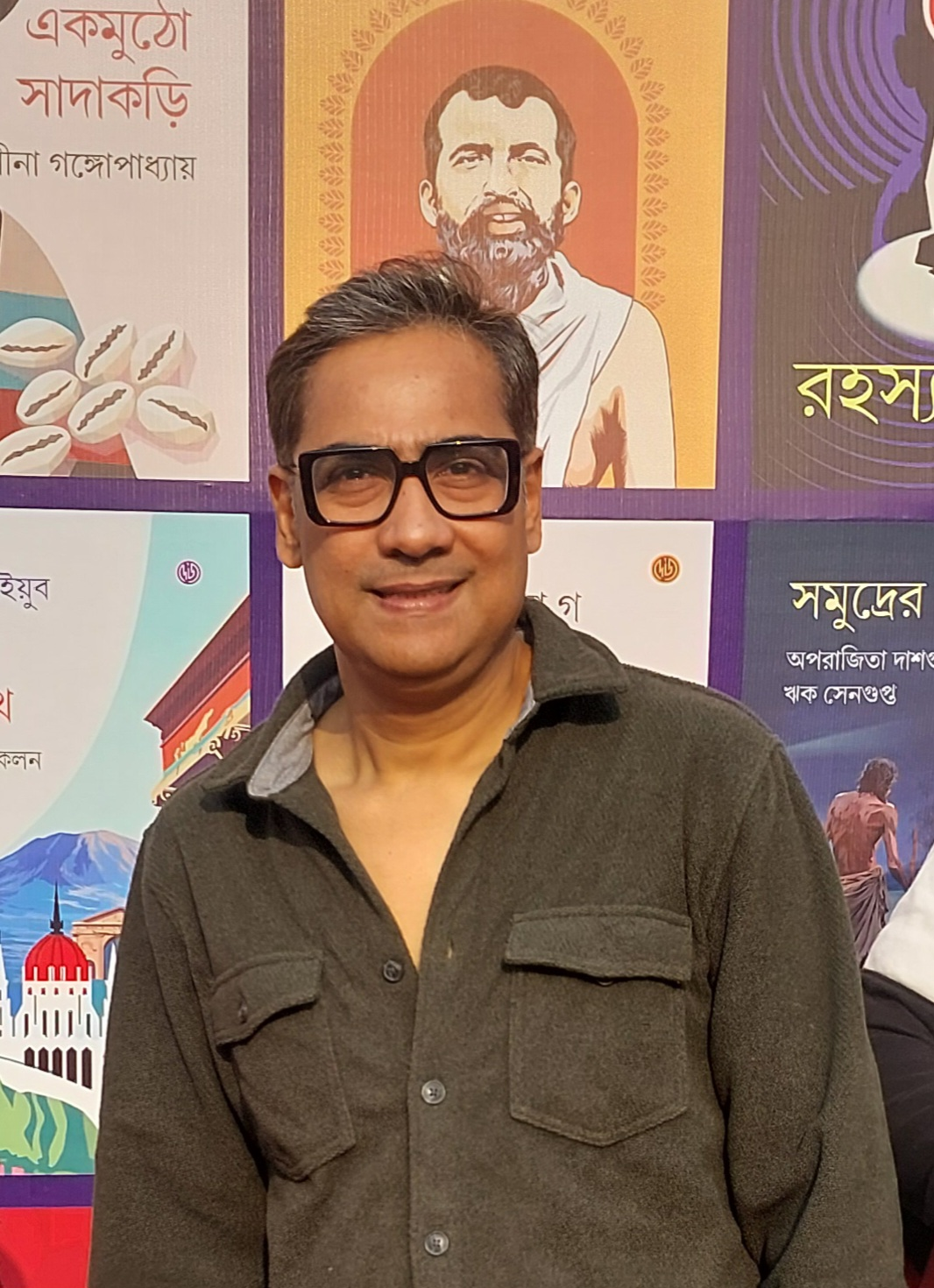
- Koushik Sen in Kolkata Book Fair
- Born: 19 September 1968 (age 58); Kolkata, West Bengal, India
- Occupation: Actor
- Years active: 1979–present
- Spouse: Reshmi Sen
- Children: Riddhi Sen
- Parent(s): Chitra Sen (mother); Shyamal Sen (father)

Koushik Sen (born 19 September 1968) is an Indian actor known for his work across film, television, Over-the-top media service and theatre, based in Kolkata. He is the founder and director of the theatre group Swapnasandhani. He won the Bengal Film Journalists' Association Award for Best Supporting Actor for his performance in Aamar Bhuvan, directed by Mrinal Sen. He was awarded Girish Purashkar 2023 by the Cultural Department of the Government of West Bengal for his extraordinary contributions to theatre. In 2024, he was awarded Telly Academy Best Actor Award for Godhuli Alap series.

== Personal life ==
Kaushik Sen was born into a Baidya Brahmin family on 19 September 1968. He is the son of actress Chitra Mondal Sen and actor Shyamal Sen. He studied at the Julien Day School, and graduated from Scottish Church College, both in Kolkata. Sen is married to Reshmi Sen and has a son, Riddhi Sen. He is a Vice President of the "West Bengal Motion Picture Artists' Forum" along with Sabyasachi Chakrabarty, Aparajita Auddy, Bharat Kaul and Sumanta Mukherjee.

== Stage performance ==
Since 1992, he has been the director of Bengali theatre group Swapnasandhani. The group has staged around fifty plays and perform regularly in all the major theaters at Kolkata and in major countries all around the globe. Their most recent plays are Hamlet and Taray Taray. They recently performed Hamlet at Chicago NABC2024. It was hugely appreciated with standing ovation. Soon they will travel Australia with their newest production "Andhar Ghonay".

In 2010, the group staged the play Birpurush, which was inspired by Rabindranath Tagore's poem. It was a political play and dealt with the contemporary context of West Bengal. The play stirred up some controversies.

Sen appeared with Soumitra Chatterjee in the play Tiktiki.

== Filmography ==
Sen made his acting debut in 1979 with Mrinal Sen's Ek Din Pratidin as a child actor. He has acted in more than seventy films. His best known performances in films are: Chalchitro (1981), Wheel Chair (1995), Aamaar Bhuvan (2002), Shunyo E Buke (2005), BankuBabur Bandhu (2006), Dwando (2009), Iti Mrinalini (2011), Charulata 2011 (2011), Piyalir Password (2012), Abar Byomkesh (2012), Goynar Baksho (2013), Rupkotha Noy (2013), Kolkata Calling (2014), Bhengchi (2015), Babar Naam Gandhiji (2015), Rajkahini (2015), Kahaani 2 (2016), Lion (2016), Zulfiqar (2016), Jawker Dhan (2017), Durga Sahay (2017), Raktokarobi (2017), Laboratory (2018), Rasogolla (2018), Barunbabur Bandhu (2019), Durgeshgorer Guptodhan (2019), Ekannaborti (2021), Belashuru (2022), Kaberi Antardhan (2023), Ardhangini (2023), Dabaru (2024) and Shotyi Bole Shotyi Kichhu Nei (2025).

Year	Film	Note
1980	Ek Din Pratidin	
1981	Chalchitro	
1990	Papi	
1993	Prajapati	
1994	Bidrohini	
1994	Wheel Chair	
1995	Daughters of This Century	
1996	Sopan	
1996	Himghar	
1998	Sanghat	
1998	Ajab Gayer Ajab Katha	
2000	Chakrabyuha	
2002	Aamar Bhuban	
2002	Desh	
2002	Ferari Fauj	
2002	Hindustani Sipahi	
2003	Alo	Commentator (voice)
2004	Debipaksha	
2005	Shunyo E Buke	
2006	Bankhubabur Bandhu	
2009	Dwando	
2010	Banshiwala	
2010	Angshumaner Chhobi	(Guest appearance)
2011	Charuulata 2011	
2011	Kagojer Bou	(Guest appearance)
2011	Iti Mrinalini	
2011	Moubane Aaj	
2012	Abar Byomkesh	
2012	Piyalir Password	
2012	Dutta vs Dutta	
2013	Rupe Tomay Bholabo Na	
2013	Rupkatha Noy	
2013	Goynar Baksho	
2014	Taan	
2014	Byomkesh Phire Elo	
2015	Open Tee Bioscope	
2015	Bhengchi	
2015	Shajarur Kanta	
2015	Arshinagar	
2015	Babar Naam Gandhiji	
2015	Rajkahini	
2015	Byomkesh Bakshi	
2015	Ajana Batas	
2016	Abar Ekla Cholo	
2016	Kiriti O Kalo Bhromor	
2016	Zulfikar	
2016	Dark Chocolate	
2016	Kahaani 2: Durga Rani Singh	Policeman at Kalimpong
2016	Kuheli	
2016	Byomkesh Pawrbo	
2016	Lion	Debut in Hollywood
2017	Mondobasar Golpo	
2017	Boss 2	
2017	Durga Sohay	
2017	Jawker Dhan	
2017	Dhanonjay	
2017	Raktokorobi	
2017	Sedin Basante	
2018	Gohin Hriday	
2018	Rainbow Jelly	
2018	Laboratory	
2018	Rosogolla	
2019	Triangle	
2019	Borunbabur Bondhu	
2019	Durgeshgorer Guptodhon	
2021	Mukhosh	
2021	Ekannoborti	
2022	Belashuru	
2023	Kaberi Antardhan	
2023	Borfi	
2023	Ardhangini	
2024	Dabaru	
2024	Babli	
2024	Shastri	
2024	Tekka	
2025	Shotyi Bole Shotyi Kichhu Nei	
2025	Julie	
2025	10th June	
2025	Madam Sengupta	
2025	Sharthopor	
2026	Aajo Ardhangini	
2026	OCD	
2026	Ultorath	
2026	Keu Bole Biplobi Keu Bole Dakat	

== Plays ==
- Marx in Kolkata based on Howard Zinn's Marx in Soho
- Hamlet
- Taraye Taraye based on Srijato's Tara Bhora Akasher Niche
- Bidehi based on Henrik Ibsen's Ghosts
- Nirbhaya based on Bertolt Brecht's Mother Courage and Her Children
- Antigone based on Antigone (Sophocles play)
- Macbeth (also performed at Bharat Rang Mahotsav)
- Malyaban
- Jal Chhabi (debut)
- Tikitiki based on Anthony Shaffer's Sleuth
- Punoscho
- Bhalo Rakkhosher Golpo
- Prothom Partha

== Television ==
Year	Title
1990	Kalpurush
1999	Tarkash
2000-2005	Ek Akasher Niche
2005	Asamapto
2005	E Kamon Meye
	Tiktiki
	Ei Ghar Ei Sangshar
	Uro Megh
	Gaaner Oparey
	Swapath
2014	Raaikishori
2014	Byomkesh
	Sindoorkhela
	Moinaker er Upakhyan
	Godhuli Alap

== Web series ==
Year	Title	Role	Language	Platform	Notes	Ref.
2018	Monsoon Melodies		Bengali	Addatimes		
2020	Lalbazaar	Suranjan Sen	Bengali	Zee5		
2021	Shei Je Holud Pakhi 2	Diganta Basu	Bengali	Hoichoi		
2022	Mahabharat Murders	Abirlal	Bengali	Hoichoi		
2022	Sampurna	Hirak Lahiri	Bengali	Hoichoi		
2023	Mr. Kolketa	Jimutendra Basak	Bengali	Hoichoi		
2024	Saheb Bibi Joker		Bengali	Fridaay		
2024	Shekhar Homes	Mrinmay Halder	Hindi	Jio Cinema		
2026	Kuheli	SP Rana Singha	Bengali	Hoichoi		

== Awards ==
- 2003 BFJA Award in the category best actor in supporting role, for the film Aamar Bhuvan.
- 2023 Girish Purashkar for extraordinary contributions in Theatre by the Cultural Department of Government of West Bengal
- 2023 Best Actor Telly Academy Award for Godhuli Alap television series

== See also ==
- Debesh Chattopadhyay
- Arpita Ghosh
- Suman Mukhopadhyay
- Bratya Basu
- Sujan Mukhopadhyay
