= Indira Gandhi Sarani =

Road in Kolkata, India

- Red Road
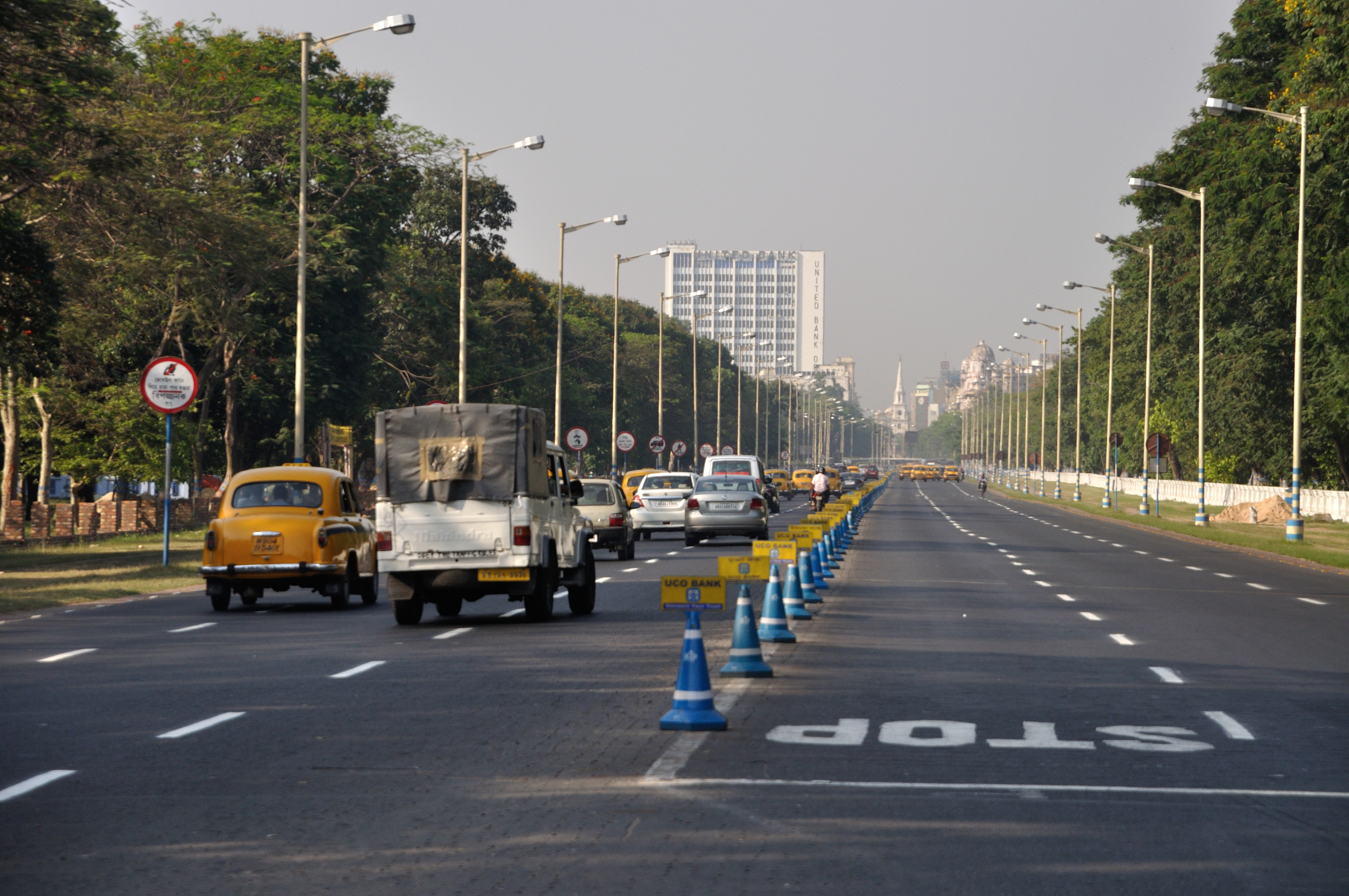
- Former name: Red Road
- Maintained by: Kolkata Municipal Corporation
- Location: Kolkata, India
- Postal code: 700021
- Nearest Kolkata Metro station: Esplanade, Park Street
- north end: Eden Gardens
- south end: Fort William West Gate

Construction
- Completion: 1820

Indira Gandhi Sarani, commonly referred to as the Red Road, is a road in Central Kolkata that runs from Eden Gardens (Rashmoni Avenue-Gostho Paul Sarani Junction) to Fort William West Gate (Dufferin Road-Outram Road Junction). South of Fort William West Gate, Red Road becomes Casuarina Avenue /Khiddirpore Road. The road, a wide boulevard, was built in 1820. It bisects the Kolkata Maidan. The British authorities intended for the road to be able to host large parades. The name 'Red Road' was given due to its surfacing.

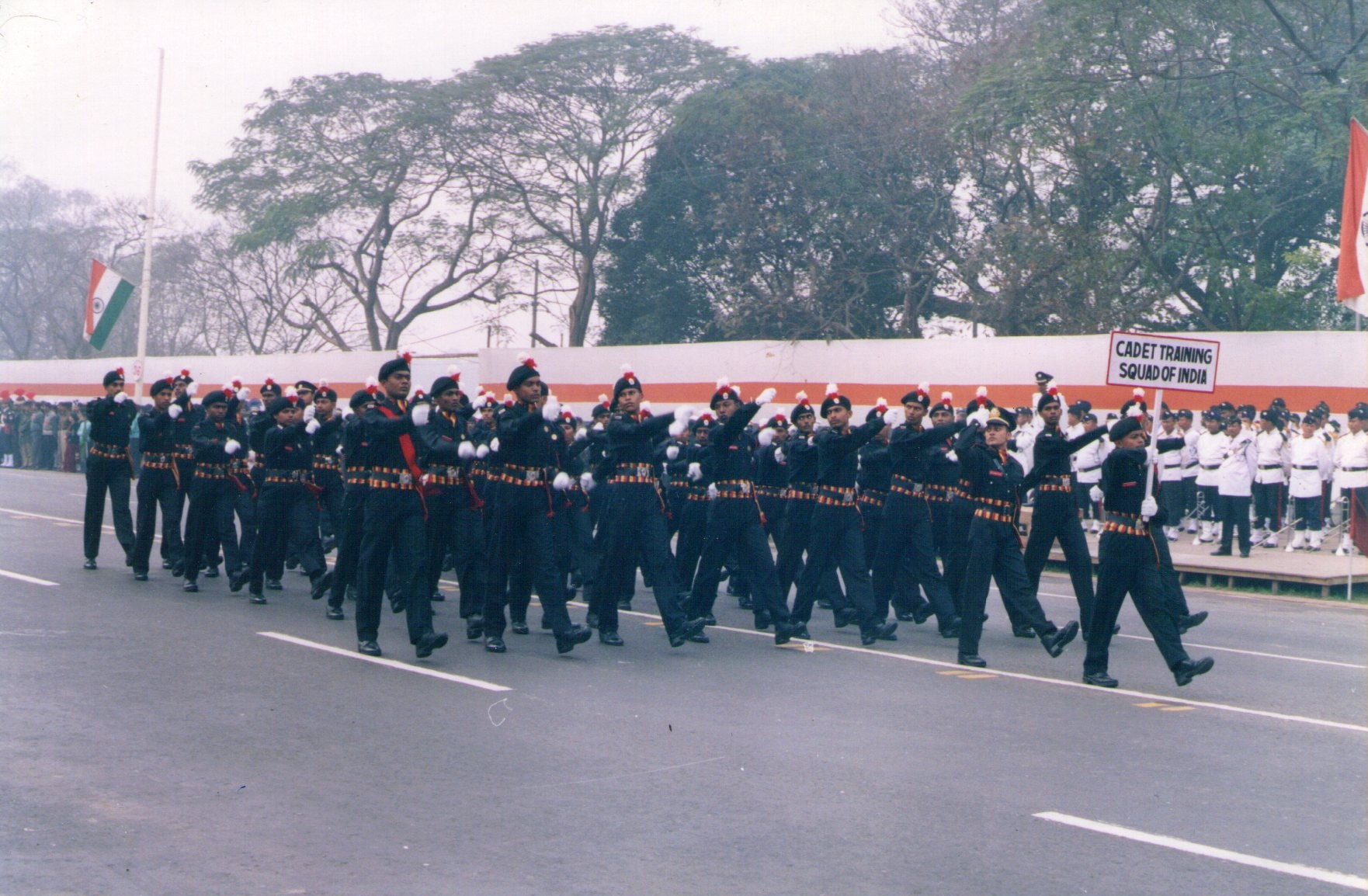
Republic Day Parade on Red Road

During the Second World War, the road, in the heart of Calcutta, served as a landing strip for Fighter aircraft. The annual Kolkata Marathon starts from the outside of the Rangers Club on Red Road.
