= Birpurush (poem) =

"Birpurush" (Bengali: বীরপুরুষ, IPA: [biːrpuruʃ], English:The Hero) is a Bengali poem written by Rabindranath Tagore. The poem depicts a child fantasising that he saves his mother from dacoits.

In the evening, when the sun is set, the child and his mother reach a barren place. There is not a single soul there. Even the cattle have returned home. Plodding silence reigns there. The mother is a bit afraid and wonders where they have arrived. The child reassures her and tells her that there is a small river ahead. (Note: Bengali: মরা নদীর সোঁতা) The mother sees a shimmering light and asks her son about it. Suddenly, they hear the cry "Ha re, re re, re re" (Note: Bengali: হাঁরে রে রে রে রে।) as a band of dacoits attacks their caravan. The mother shivers inside the palanquin; the palanquin-bearers hide in the bush. The son reassures his mother and confronts the dacoits courageously. A fight follows, in which the son emerges victorious. The son returns to his mother, who kisses his forehead and thanks him.
