= Dabaru =

2024 Indian Bengali-language biographical sports drama film

- Theatrical release poster
- Directed by: Pathikrit Basu
- Written by: Arpan Gupta (dialogues)
- Screenplay by: Aritra Banerjee
- Produced by: Nandita Roy; Shiboprosad Mukherjee; Sanjay Agarwal
- Starring: Arghya Basu Roy; Samadarshi Sarkar; Deepankar De; Rituparna Sengupta; Chiranjeet Chakraborty; Kaushik Sen
- Cinematography: Madhura Palit
- Edited by: Md. Kalam
- Music by: Bonnie Chakraborty; Prasen
- Production company: Windows Production
- Distributed by: Windows Production
- Release date: 10 May 2024
- Running time: 131 minutes
- Country: India
- Language: Bengali

Dabaru (Bengali pronunciation: [d̪abaɾu] transl. The Chess Master) is a 2024 Indian Bengali-language biographical sports drama film directed by Pathikrit Basu. Produced by Nandita Roy and Shiboprosad Mukherjee under the banner of Windows Production, the film is based on the life of the Indian chess Grandmaster Surya Shekhar Ganguly. The film chronicles the journey of Ganguly from North Kolkata's slums to becoming India's youngest Grandmaster at age 19, played by Arghya Basu Roy. It also features an ensemble cast of Dipankar De, Chiranjeet Chakraborty, Rituparna Sengupta, Shankar Chakraborty and Kaushik Sen in another pivotal roles.

Development on the film began in early 2022, when Roy and Mukherjee approached Aritra Banerjee to begin writing the script, in his debut as a screenwriter. He had interviewed Ganguly, along with its dialogue writer Arpan Gupta. Principal photography commenced in July 2023; predominantly shot in Kolkata, portions were filmed in Chennai and Germany. Modhura Palit served as the cinematographer and MD. Kalam as the editor. Bonnie Chakraborty scored the film's background music and soundtrack, with Prasen as the guest composer. Samriddha Ghosh, a coach with the Indian women's chess team, trained Basu Roy and the cast for the chess sequences.

Dabaru was released worldwide on 10 May 2024 to universal critical acclaim, with praise centered on the film's "honest" depiction of a real-life story and performance by its whole cast, including the emotional weight. It was a commercial success, being noted as the first Indian film depicted on chess.

== Plot ==
The film follows Surya, who grows up in the slums of North Kolkata. He discovers chess through his supportive grandfather, Nabin Sarkar, despite facing poverty and opposition from his alcoholic father. Surya's mother, Karuna Devi, becomes his main supporter as he pursues his passion for chess.

As Surya navigates the competitive chess scene, he trains under two contrasting coaches: the encouraging Rathindra and later the abusive Samiran. His journey is filled with challenges, but his determination leads him to the pinnacle of success. The film culminates in Surya's victory at the 1998 Commonwealth Chess Championship at just 19 years old, making him India's youngest Grandmaster. Through resilience and the support of his family, Surya's story reveals the transformative power of hope, love, and dedication in the face of adversity.

== Cast ==
- Rituparna Sengupta as Karuna Devi, Surya's mother: Sengupta revealed she studied chess basics and met Ganguly's real mother to prepare, calling it "emotionally draining to portray a mother battling poverty while nurturing genius".
- Chiranjeet Chakraborty as Rathindra Nath Chakraborty, Surya's mentor: Chakraborty described his character as "the strategic architect behind raw talent," consulting real chess coaches for authenticity.
- Deepankar De as Nabin Sarkar, Surya's maternal grandfather
- Kaushik Sen as Samiran, the strict coach: Sen admitted drawing inspiration from Whiplash but with "Bengali intellectual ruthlessness".
- Arghya Basu Roy as teenage Surya Ganguly: Trained for 6 months with chess coordinator Samriddhaa Ghosh to master tournament etiquette.
- Samadarshi Sarkar as young Surya Ganguly: Cast for his "photographic memory during chess sequences"
- Shankar Chakraborty as Surya's skeptical father
- Kharaj Mukherjee as local moneylender
- Biswanath Basu as neighbor
- Abhijit Guha as Sports Minister Subir Banerjee

== Production ==
=== Development ===
Producers Nandita Roy and Shiboprosad Mukherjee approached director Pathikrit Basu in 2022 about adapting Ganguly's life, seeing it as "the perfect intellectual sports drama". Ganguly revealed he learned about the project "a day before my daughter was born" and served as creative consultant. Screenwriter Aritra Banerjee (Aritra's Gyan) spent 4 months with Ganguly's family, noting they fictionalized certain elements like the alcoholic father for dramatic tension.

=== Filming ===
Principal photography began July 2023 in Kolkata's Kumartuli and Shovabazar areas. The climactic Commonwealth Championship scene featured 16 real chess players from Kolkata clubs. Cinematographer Madhura Palit employed overhead drone shots transitioning chessboards to Kolkata alleyways.

=== Music ===
Bonnie Chakraborty and Prasen composed the soundtrack, with the title track fusing "dhol rhythms with chess clock ticks". The song "Jhogra Kori Chol" by Mainak and Surangana topped Bengali charts for 3 weeks.

=== Marketing ===
The motion poster launched September 2023 with Grandmasters Viswanathan Anand and Dibyendu Barua present. The trailer debuted April 2024 at Kolkata's Quest Mall, attended by chess legends and actor Mithun Chakraborty who praised its authenticity.

== Release ==
The film premiered May 10, 2024 at Kolkata's Priya Cinema with chess-themed decor. It was screened at Alliance Française du Bengale's film festival in July 2024. Windows Production held celebratory events after its commercial success. The film had its digital premiere on 14th September 2025, on ZEE5.

== Reception ==
=== Critical response ===
Poorna Banerjee from Times Of India reviewed the film and said that Dabaru is inspired by Grandmaster Surya Sekhar Ganguly’s life. It follows young Souro, a chess prodigy from a poor family in North Kolkata. His grandfather (Dipankar Dey) teaches him chess with his mother Karuna's (Rituparna Sengupta) support, despite his father’s objections. Souro meets his coach (Chiranjeet), who trains him to compete and pursue his dream of becoming a Grandmaster. Director Pathikrit Basu keeps the pace quick, while cinematographer Madhura Palit beautifully captures North Kolkata's streets, with sharp editing that highlights details like old chess sets.

The story resembles Dangal but focuses on family bonds. A deeper explanation of chess could benefit those unfamiliar with the game, yet the film primarily emphasizes relationships. Samadarshi Sarkar delivers a natural performance as young Souro, and Arghya Basu Roy portrays the teenage version effectively. Dipankar Dey plays the hopeful grandfather, while Rituparna Sengupta embodies the dedicated mother. Shankar Chakravarty shows notable growth as Souro’s father, and Chiranjeet shines as Coach Rathijit. The music, including the title track Dabaru and the romantic song Jhogra kori chol, is enjoyable. Although the second half loses some intensity, Dabaru remains engaging, making it worth watching even for those less familiar with chess.

The Telegraph highlights that sports biopics are rare in Bengali cinema, especially about a young chess prodigy. Director Pathikrit Basu deserves praise for telling the story of Grandmaster Surya Sekhar Ganguly, though the film focuses more on Souro’s bond with his mother. Souro, a boy from North Kolkata with a talent for chess, gets support from his grandfather Nabin (Dipankar Dey) and mother Karuna (Rituparna Sengupta) as they help train him. Coach Rathindra Chakraborty (Chiranjeet) discovers Souro at a tournament, but Souro faces challenges like a lack of sponsors and difficulties accessing government support. After a family emergency, coaching shifts to Samiran (Koushik Sen), whose strict methods and Souro's teenage romance distract him from his goal of becoming a Grandmaster.

The film leans into melodrama, featuring loud dialogue, and some subplots, such as a money lender (Kharaj Mukherjee) and nosy neighbors (Biswanath Basu and Sanghasree Sinha), do not enhance the story. It also lacks the excitement of chess, often showing pieces moving without explaining the game’s strategy. The bond between Souro, his mother, and grandfather is central. Dipankar Dey conveys hope as the grandfather, while Rituparna Sengupta shows a mother finding joy in her son’s success. Samadarshi Sarkar is natural as young Souro, and Arghya Basu Roy impresses as the teenager. Chiranjeet is a likable coach, and Koushik Sen leaves an impression as the strict coach. Madhura Palit’s cinematography captures Kolkata in the 1980s and ’90s, creating beautiful visuals with light and shadow.

In a review from ChessBase India, the writer reflects on the film Dabaru, inspired by the life of Grandmaster Surya Sekhar Ganguly. It begins with young Souro learning important life lessons through chess, like the saying, "You should never attack an unarmed king." The reviewer expresses excitement about a Bangla film centered on chess and shares their experience watching it with family in Hyderabad, despite a small audience turnout. They appreciate the effort to make chess relatable, using elements from battles and explaining terms like stalemate and Zugzwang. The film also addresses the struggles of a middle-class family, portraying poverty with vivid detail.

The relationship between Souro and his grandfather is central to the story, highlighting the vital role of grandparents. Rituparna Sengupta's portrayal of Souro's mother is praised for its emotional depth, showcasing her worries and hopes. The character of Rathindra, Souro's coach, embodies the importance of guidance without imposing rigid ideas. The film includes a charming subplot involving Souro's friendship with Debangana, adding depth to his character. While the reviewer felt the film could have been shorter and the writing crisper, they enjoyed the overall experience and noted that the film's message about hope and perseverance resonated. They encourage others to watch Dabaru when it becomes available on OTT platforms.

OTTPlay's review notes that chess chooses Souro, not the other way around. This unique pairing of a young boy from North Kolkata and the sport could create compelling drama, but the film falls into clichéd melodrama. The dialogues are often excessively loud and dull, making conversations feel unrealistic.

Rituparna, Shankar Chakraborty (Souro’s father), and Kaushik Sen (Samiran, the arrogant coach) deliver strong performances. Samadarshi shines as young Souro, while Arghya Basu Roy (teenage Souro) has mixed moments. Dipankar Dey is fine as Nabin, and the bond between him and Souro is heartfelt. Chiranjeet’s character suffers from weak dialogue and delivery.

The soundtrack dominates the film, often overpowering the narrative. While some songs are enjoyable, the lyrics are often inaudible..

=== Controversies ===
Ganguly clarified his real father wasn't alcoholic, calling that "dramatic liberty to heighten conflict". Director Basu defended the coach's brutality: "We needed a tangible antagonist since poverty isn't visually dynamic".
