= Rajatava Dutta =

Indian actor (born 1967)

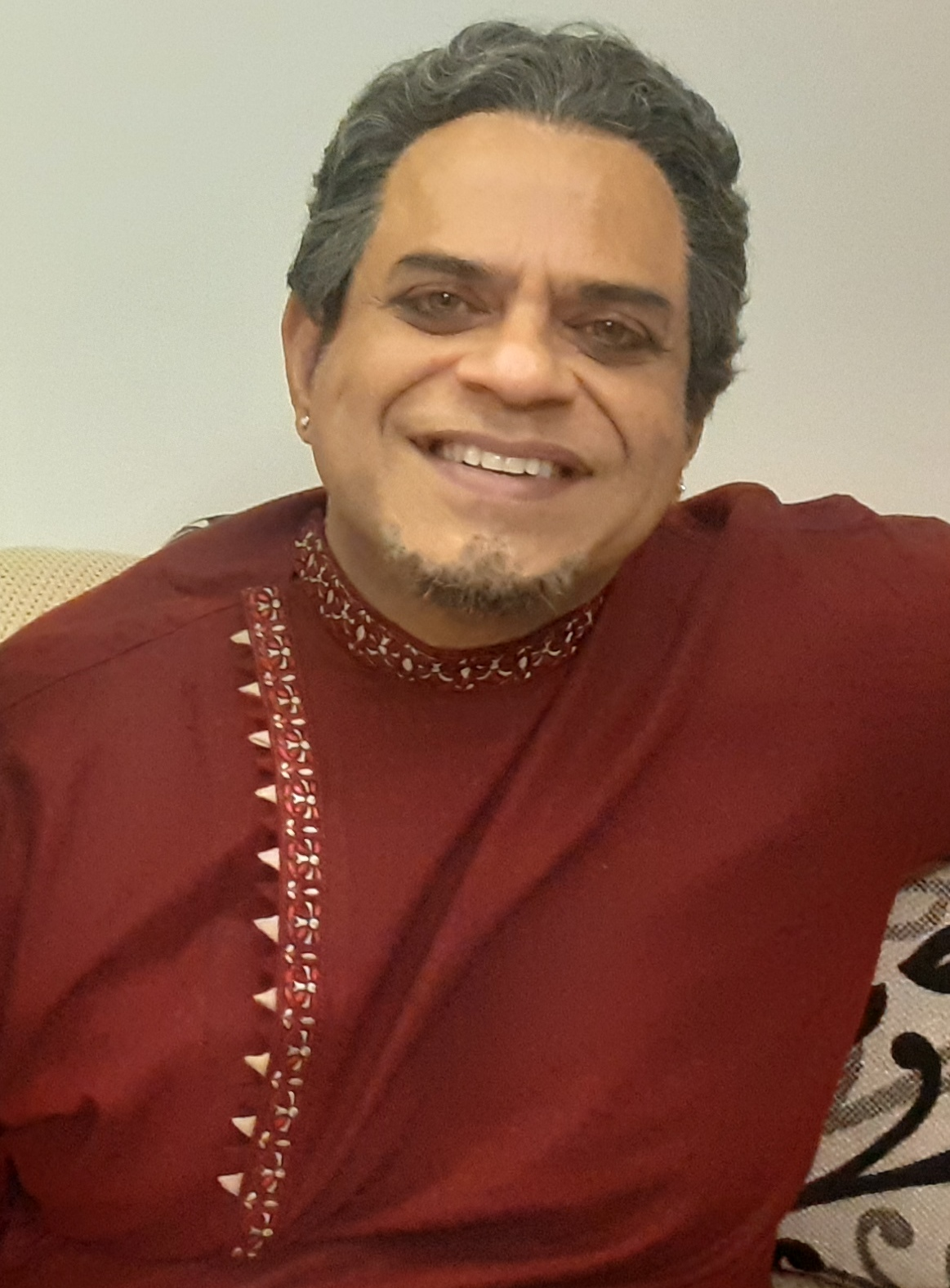
- Dutta in 2017
- Born: 11 August 1967 (age 59); Calcutta, West Bengal, India
- Citizenship: Indian
- Education: Netaji Nagar College
- Occupation: Actor
- Years active: 1987 - present
- Known for: Full works

Rajatava Dutta (born 11 August 1967) is an Indian actor who appears in Bengali, Hindi and English films. He is often regarded as one of the most celebrated and respected Bengali actors of his generation. In a career spanning over three decades, on one hand he has received popularity for playing negative characters in commercially successful films like MLA Fatakeshto, Challenge, Paglu, Boss: Born to Rule etc. and on the other hand he has gained critical praise for his versatile acting performances in critically acclaimed films like Paromitar Ekdin, Open Tee Bioscope, Bogla Mama Jug Jug Jiyo etc. and in the web-series Byadh. He has been a judge on the Zee Bangla reality show Mirakkel.

== Early life ==
From Ballygunge Government High School Rajatava passed Madhyamik in 1983, passed Higher Secondary from Goenka College of Commerce and Business Administration in 1985 and graduated from Netaji Nagar College in 1987.

== Career ==
=== Theatre ===
Rajatava has been working as a theatre artist since 1987. He has started his work in the theatre group Antarmukh under Soumitra Basu (1987–1990). After that in Ushnik with Ishita Mukherjee (1990–1993). In Swapnosandhani with Kaushik Sen (1993–1995) (1996–1997) (2011–2016). In Gandhar with Ashit Mukhopadhyay (1994) with Dwijen Banarjee (1995), in Natyoanon with Chandan Sen (1997–2000) in Ansambal with Sohag Sen (1997–2001), In Calcutta Performers with Tamal Roy Chowdhury (2001–2002), in Sangsriti with Debesh Chattopadhyay (2002–1018). In Lokokristi With Falguni Chatterjee (2004–2006), In Vupen Bose Avenue Chorus with Amitava Dutta (2014–2018) and In Natyoshala with Rana Basu (2016–2018).

== Accolades ==
In the film industry he started his career as a junior artist. He first received his big break in the 1998 film Ajab Gayer Ajab Katha. He received the Bengal Film Journalists' Association Awards in 2001 for Paromitar Ekdin in the category best actor in a supporting role. In 2006 he received the Anandalok Awards for the movie MLA Fatakeshto for the best villain category.

== See also ==
- Mirakkel
- Swapnasandhani
