= List of Indian Bengali films of 2020 =

This is a list of Bengali language films that released in 2020.

== January–March ==
Opening		Title	Director	Cast	Production company	Genre	Ref.
J A N U A R Y	3	Asur	Pavel	Jeet, Abir Chatterjee, Nusrat Jahan	Jeetz Filmworks	Action, Drama	
J A N U A R Y	3	Mukhosh	Argha Deep Chatterjee	Rajatava Dutta, Payel Sarkar, Shantilal Mukherjee, Prantik Banerjee	SSG Entertainment	Thriller	
J A N U A R Y	10	Borunbabur Bondhu	Anik Dutta	Soumitra Chatterjee, Paran Bandopadhyay, Madhabi Mukherjee	Surinder Films	Investigative Thriller	
J A N U A R Y	10	Jio Jamai	Nehal Dutta	Hiraan Chatterjee, Ishani Ghosh	Jyoti Production	Romance	
J A N U A R Y	17	Uraan	Tridib Raman	Srabanti Chatterjee, Saheb Bhattacharjee		Romance	
J A N U A R Y	17	Tumi O Tumi	Arunima Dey	Soumitra Chatterjee, Lily Chakravarty, Arunima Dey	Digimax Creation	Drama	
J A N U A R Y	23	Dwitiyo Purush	Srijit Mukherji	Parambrata Chatterjee, Raima Sen	Shree Venkatesh Films	Thriller	
J A N U A R Y	24	Michhil	Surajit Nag, Ujjwal Basu	Basabdatta Chatterjee, Shantilal Mukherjee, Samadarshi Dutta	Surajit Nag Films	Drama	
J A N U A R Y	31	Abyakto	Arjun Dutta	Arpita Chatterjee, Adil Hussain, Anubhav Kanjilal, Anirban Ghosh, Lily Chakravarty, Kheya Chattopadhyay	Trina Films	Drama	
F E B R U A R Y	4	Sraboner Dhara	Sudeshna Roy, Abhijeet Guha	Soumitra Chatterjee, Parambrata Chatterjee	Macneil Engineering Ltd	Drama	
F E B R U A R Y	14	Love Aaj Kal Porshu	Pratim D Gupta	Arjun Chakrabarty, Madhumita Sarkar, Paoli Dam, Anindita Bose	Shree Venkatesh Films	Romance, Drama, Thriller	
F E B R U A R Y	14	Bidrohini	Sandip Chowdhury	Rituparna Sengupta, Jeetu Kamal, Rishi Kaushik, Sonali Chowdhury	Mirage Movies	Action Drama	
F E B R U A R Y	28	Din Ratrir Golpo	Prosenjit Choudhury	Rajatava Dutta, Supriti Choudhury, Pradip Mukherjee, Rukmini Chatterjee, Sourav Chatterjee, Rayati Bhattacheryee.		Space Drama	
M A R C H	6	Chayamurti	Jeet Chatterjee	Sumona Das, Sabyasachi Chowdhury, Abhishek Chatterjee and Soma Das	Rajdeep Films & Productions	Thriller, horror	
M A R C H	6	Brahma Janen Gopon Kommoti	Aritra Mukherjee	Ritabhari Chakraborty, Soham Majumdar	Windows Production	Drama	
M A R C H	13	The Parcel	Indrasis Acharya	Rituparna Sengupta, Saswata Chatterjee, Anindya Chatterjee and Ambarish Bhattacharya	Rituparna Sengupta and Krishna Kayal	Thriller, Mystery	

== April–June ==
Films were not released theatrically from 17 March till end of June due to the COVID-19 pandemic.

Opening		Title	Director	Cast	Production company	Genre	Ref.
J U N E	28	The Prologue	Chandrasish Ray	Prosenjit Chatterjee, Satyam Bhattacharya	NIDEAS Production	Drama	

== July–September ==
Opening		Title	Director	Cast	Production company	Genre	Ref.
A U G U S T	7	Detective	Joydip Mukherjee	Anirban Bhattacharya, Ishaa Saha, Saheb Bhattacharya	Shree Venkatesh Films	Drama	
S E P T E M B E R	6	Tasher Ghawr	Sudipto Roy	Swastika Mukherjee	Sudipto Roy	Drama	
S E P T E M B E R	11	Tiki-Taka	Parambrata Chatterjee	Parambrata Chatterjee	Parambrata Chattopadhyay	Comedy, Drama	

== October–December ==
Opening		Title	Director	Cast	Production company	Genre	Ref.
O C T O B E R	21	SOS Kolkata	Anshuman Pratyush	Yash Dasgupta, Mimi Chakraborty, Nusrat Jahan and Sabyasachi Chakraborty	Jarek Entertainment, Pratyush Production	Action-thriller	
O C T O B E R	21	Rawkto Rawhosyo	Soukaryo Ghosal	Koel Mallick, Rwitobroto Mukherjee, Chandan Roy Sanyal, Basabdatta Chatterjee, Lily Chakravarty, Shantilal Mukherjee, Kanchana Moitra, Subhra Sourav Das, Joyraj Bhattacharjee, Ujjwal Malakar, Shreeansh Sarkar	Surinder Films	Mystery, Thriller	
O C T O B E R	21	Dracula Sir	Debaloy Bhattacharya	Anirban Bhattacharya, Mimi Chakraborty, Bidipta Chakraborty, Rudranil Ghosh	Shree Venkatesh Films	Horror	
O C T O B E R	21	Love Story	Rajiv Kumar Biswas	Bonny Sengupta, Rittika Sen, Reshmi Sen, Rajat Ganguly	Surinder Films	Romantic	
O C T O B E R	21	Guldasta	Arjunn Dutta	Arpita Chatterjee, Swastika Mukherjee, Debjani Chattopadhyay	Roop Production and Entertainment	Drama	
O C T O B E R	21	Doodhpither Gachh	Ujjwal Basu	Daminee Benny Basu, Kaushik Roy, Shibani Maity, Harshil Das	ACL Movies	Children's film	
O C T O B E R	21	Shironam	Indranil Ghosh	Jishu Sengupata, Saswata Chatterjee, Swastika Mukherjee	R P Techvision	Drama	
O C T O B E R	21	Cholo Potol Tuli	Arindam Ganguly	Sabyasachi Chakrabarty, Gaurav Chakrabarty	Pastel Entertainment	Comedy, Drama	
N O V	13	Switzerland	Souvik Kundu	Abir Chatterjee, Rukmini Maitra, Ambarish Bhattacharya	Grassroot Entertainment	Drama	
D E C	24	Cheeni	Mainak Bhoumik	Madhumita Sarkar, Aparajita Auddy, Sourav Das	Shree Venkatesh Films	Drama	
D E C	25	Beg For Life	Suvendu Das	Sneha Biswas, Tapas Paul, Biswajit Chakraborty	Das Production	Suspense	
