= Supratim Bhol =

Indian cinematographer

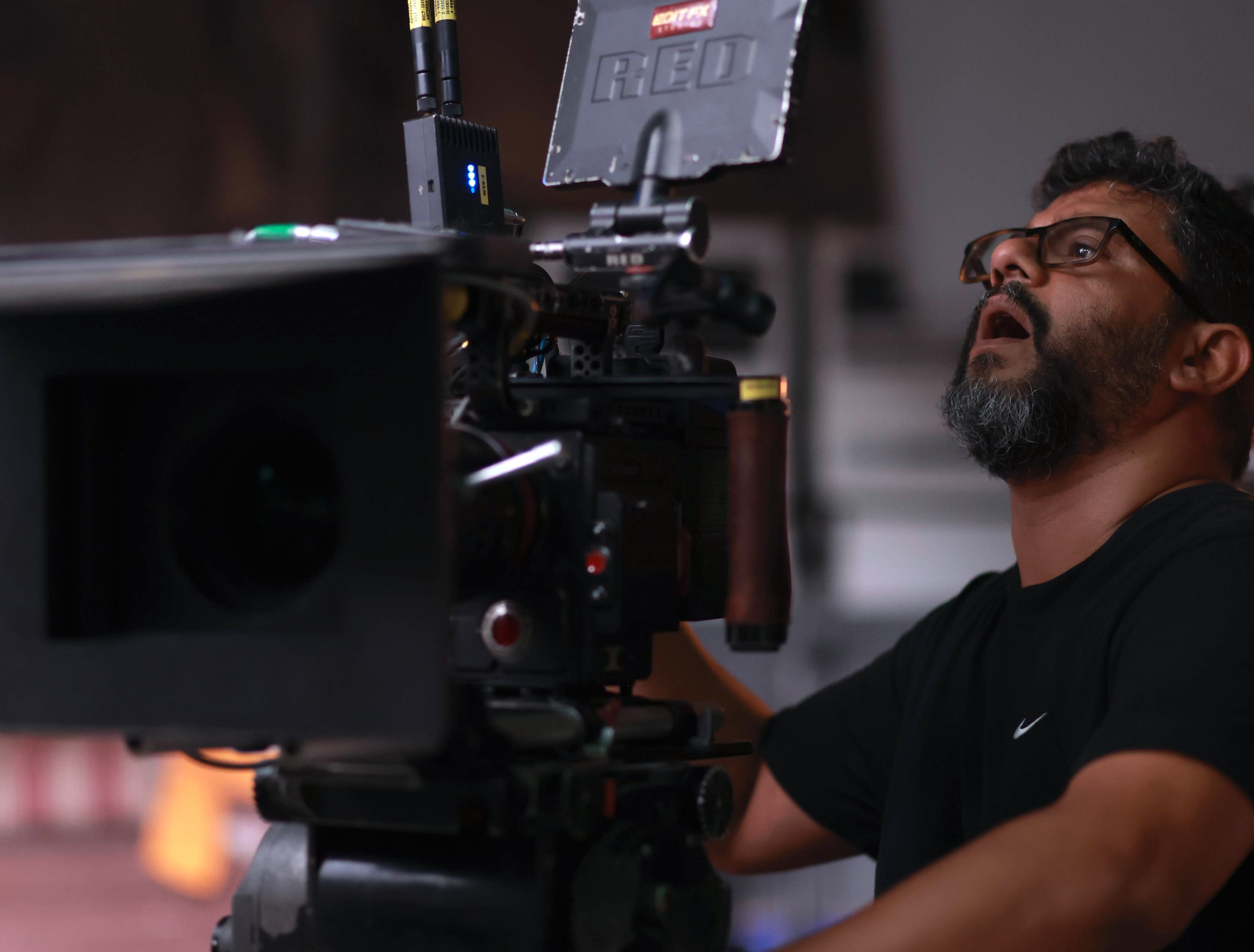
- Born: 10 December 1979 (age 46); Midnapore, West Bengal, India
- Education: Fergusson University; Film and Television Institute of India
- Occupations: Director of Photography, Cinematographer
- Years active: 2015—present
- Website: supratimbhol.com

Supratim Bhol (born 10 December 1979) is an Indian cinematographer and a member of the Indian Society of Cinematographers. He won the 68th National Film Award for Best Cinematography and the Filmfare Award East in 2021.

== Career ==
After graduating from the Film and Television Institute of India, Supratim began his career travelling across 23 states of India, shooting short films, corporate films, music videos, advertisements, and documentaries. His debut feature film was Sahaj Pather Gappo (2016), which earned him a nomination for Filmfare Awards East in 2017. He then shot his first Hindi feature, Panchlait (2017) which was directed by Prem Prakash Modi, released pan India, and was selected for the 49th International Film Festival of India.

He has collaborated with Arjun Dutta on Abyakto (2018), Guldasta (2020), Shrimati (2021), & Deep Fridge (2023), which won the National Film Award for Best Bengali Feature. The duo has garnered critical acclaim for their work.

His work on Subrajit Mirta's Avijatrik (2020), a sequel to the famous The Apu Trilogy, produced by Madhur Bhandarkar traveled around the world and earned him the Best Cinematography Award in the feature film category, at the 68th National Film Awards. He also won the Filmfare Award East and the West Bengal Film Journalists' Association Award for Best Cinematography.

He shot Lomad, the world's first Black and White One-shot (93 minutes) feature film. Additionally he shot Aparajito - The Undefeated, directed by Anik Dutta and based on the life of ace film maker Satyajit Ray. The film won the FIPRESCI International Critics Award and was a commercial success at the box office.

His latest work is the Hindi feature A Wedding Story, directed by Abhinav Pareek. His next venture Bibi Payra and Mad Horse are slated for release.

== Filmography ==
Year	Title	Language	Director(s)	Notes
2016	Colours of Innocence	Bengali	Manas Mukul Pal	Nominated - Filmfare Awards East for Best CinematographyIndian Panorama - International Film Festival of India 2016
2016	Chorabali	Bengali	Subhrajit Mitra	
2017	Panchlait	Hindi	Prem Prakash Modi	Indian Panorama - International Film Festival of India 2018
2018	Abyakto	Bengali	Arjunn Dutta	Indian Panorama - International Film Festival of India 2018
2020	Guldasta	Bengali	Arjunn Dutta	
2021	Avijatrik	Bengali	Subhrajit Mitra	Winner - National Film Award for Best Cinematography Winner - Best Cinematography | Filmfare Awards East Winner - European Cinematography Award 2020 Winner - Best Cinematography | Seattle International Film Festival 2021 Winner - Best Cinematography | West Bengal Film Journalists' Association Indian Panorama - International Film Festival of India 2018
2021	Lomad	Hindi	Hemwant Tiwari	Nominated - Best Cinematography | Seattle International Film Festival 2020
2022	Aparajito	Bengali	Anik Dutta	Winner - Best Cinematography | AIFF Aurangabad 2023 Winner - Best Cinematography | Golden Sparrow | Diorama International Film Festival 2023
2022	Shrimati	Bengali	Arjunn Dutta	
2022	Dada Lakhmi	Haryanvi	Yashpal Sharma	Winner - National Award for Best Haryanvi Film
2023	A Wedding Story	Hindi	Abhinav Pareek	
2024	Deep Fridge	Bengali	Arjunn Dutta	Winner - National Award for Best Bengali Film Indian Panorama - International Film Festival of India 2023
TBA	Bibi Payra	Bengali	Arjunn Dutta	
TBA	Mad Horse	Bengali	Sekhar Das	
