= Bibi Payra =

2026 Indian Bengali film

- Theatrical release poster
- Directed by: Arjunn Dutta
- Screenplay by: Arjunn Dutta; Ashirbad Maitra
- Story by: Arjunn Dutta; Ashirbad Maitra
- Produced by: Pradip Kumar Nandy
- Starring: Swastika Mukherjee; Paoli Dam; Anindya Sengupta
- Cinematography: Supraatim Bholl
- Edited by: Sujay Datta Ray
- Music by: Mainak Mazoomdar
- Production company: Nandy Movies
- Distributed by: Nandy Movies
- Release date: 10 April 2026
- Running time: 120 minutes
- Country: India
- Language: Bengali

Bibi Payra (transl. Pigeon Queen) is a 2026 Indian Bengali dark comedy film directed by Arjunn Dutta and co-written by Dutta along with Ashirbad Maitra. Produced by Pradip Kumar Nandy under the banner of Nandy Movies, the film stars Swastika Mukherjee and Paoli Dam in the lead roles.

Mainak Mazoomdar has composed the music as well as the background score of the film. The cinematography has been done by Supraatim Bholl while Sujay Datta Ray handled the editing. The dance choreography has been handled by Baba Yadav. The film was released in the theatres on 10 April 2026.

== Synopsis ==
Shiuli and Jhuma are two middle-class women living in unhappy marriages. Bound by social and financial constraints, they decide to change their way of living. Their actions start a chain of events, leading them into further complications. As the story unfolds, Shiuli and Jhuma confront the consequences of their choices while navigating through domestic abuse, social stigma and friendship.

== Cast ==
- Swastika Mukherjee as Shiuli
- Paoli Dam as Jhuma
- Anirban Chakrabarti as Shiuli's husband Jagannath
- Anindya Sengupta as insurance agent Debu
- Subrat Dutta as Jhuma's husband
- Lokenath Dey as Jagannath's boss
- Ankita Majhi as Shiuli's sister-in-law
- Bhabani Basu Majumdar as Jhuma's aunt
- Rupali Bhattacharya

== Production ==
Bibi Payra marked Swastika Mukherjee's third collaboration with Arjunn Dutta after Guldasta (2020) and Shrimati (2022). This marked Swastika and Paoli's collaboration 11 years after Family Album (2015). Anindya Sengupta was cast in the role of Debu, an insurance agent.

Bibi Payra also marked Paoli Dam's second film but first release with Arjunn Dutta. She worked with Dutta in a Hindi film titled Biryani during the COVID-19 lockdown in India but it has been stuck in production hell. In an interview, Paoli Dam said that she said yes to the film since the role Dutta offered her was something unusual, which she had never played before.

== Soundtrack ==
Bibi Payra

Soundtrack album by Mainak Mazoomdar
- Released: 2026
- Genre: Film soundtrack
- Length: 5:54
- Language: Bengali
- Label: Nandy Movies

Mainak Mazoomdar has composed the music as well as the background score of the film. The lyrics have been penned by Prasen.

The first song of the film "Bibi Payra Title Track" was released on 18 March 2026. Initially, it wasn't a part of the script. The song was conceived and incorporated during the filming. The makers wanted to use an original Asha Bhosle track, but owing to copyright complications, they opted for an original song. The second single of the film "Boddo Golmele" was released on 15 April 2026.

Track listing
No.	Title	Singer(s)	Length
1.	"Bibi Payra Title Track"	Shilpa Rao	3:42
2.	"Boddo Golmele"	Anindya Chatterjee	2:12
Total length:			5:54

== Marketing ==
The teaser of the film was released on 11 March 2026. The trailer of the film was released on 2 April 2026. The premiere of the film was held at PVR INOX at South City Mall in South Kolkata.

== Release ==
The film was released in the theatres on 10 April 2026.

== Reception ==
=== Critical reception ===
Agnivo Niyogi of The Telegraph reviewed the film and wrote "It’s a dark comedy at heart, but not the kind that relies on gimmicks. The humour here comes from situations that are deeply uncomfortable, sometimes even disturbing. You laugh, but not without a slight knot in your stomach." He praised situational comedy, absence of excessive melodrama, performance of the supporting cast, Paoli and Swastika's seasoned performances in their respective roles and the tone of the film but bemoaned the rushed climax and slightly weaker second half.

Poorna Banerjee of The Times of India rated the film 3.5/5 stars and opined "Bibi Payra leans into its quirks, using humour as both mask and mirror to reflect the contradictions of urban middle-class life and the secrets it conceals. Flawed yet compelling, it stands out for its performances, tonal confidence, and an undercurrent of emotional unpredictability that keeps the viewer slightly on edge." She applauded the narrative style, performance of the whole cast, the cleverly constructed situations, tonal shifts, editing and cinematography but bemoaned the screenplay in certain parts.

Shampali Moulik of Sangbad Pratidin reviewed the film and noted "In this film, directed by National Award-winning Arjun Dutt, just as women are victims of patriarchy, each male character is also a victim of patriarchy." She applauded Swastika and Paoli's seasoned performances, the situational comedy, performance of the supporting cast, the fight sequences, cinematography and editing but criticized the slacking second half, unnecessary subplot and the rushed climax.

Naikun Nessa of The Indian Express rated the film 4.5/5 stars and highlighted "Bibi Payra' is not just a film, it is a mirror of the current society. Where there are questions, there is protest, and there are signs of change. The end of this film may not solve all the problems, but the film seems to show with its finger that the time for silence is over, it is time to turn around." She praised the strong screenplay, situational comedy and performance of the ensemble cast.

Souvik Saha of Cine Kolkata rated the film 2/5 stars and wrote "Bibi Payra had the potential to be a gripping psychological drama, but weak writing and inconsistent direction make it a missed opportunity." He applauded the storyline and the performances of the cast, especially Swastika and Paoli but criticized weak screenplay, uneven pacing, inconsistent storytelling, lack of emotional depth and the confusing tone throughout the film.

Dharitri Ganguly of The Indulge Express reviewed the film and noted "All the characters are relatable, funny and felt like someone we may have met or encountered at least once in our lives. Arjunn definitely gets brownie points for the casting." She appreciated the pace, script, direction, the excitement maintained till the end of the film, the realistic character looks, the chemistry between Paoli and Swastika and the performance of the supporting cast.
