= Arpita Pal =

Indian actress

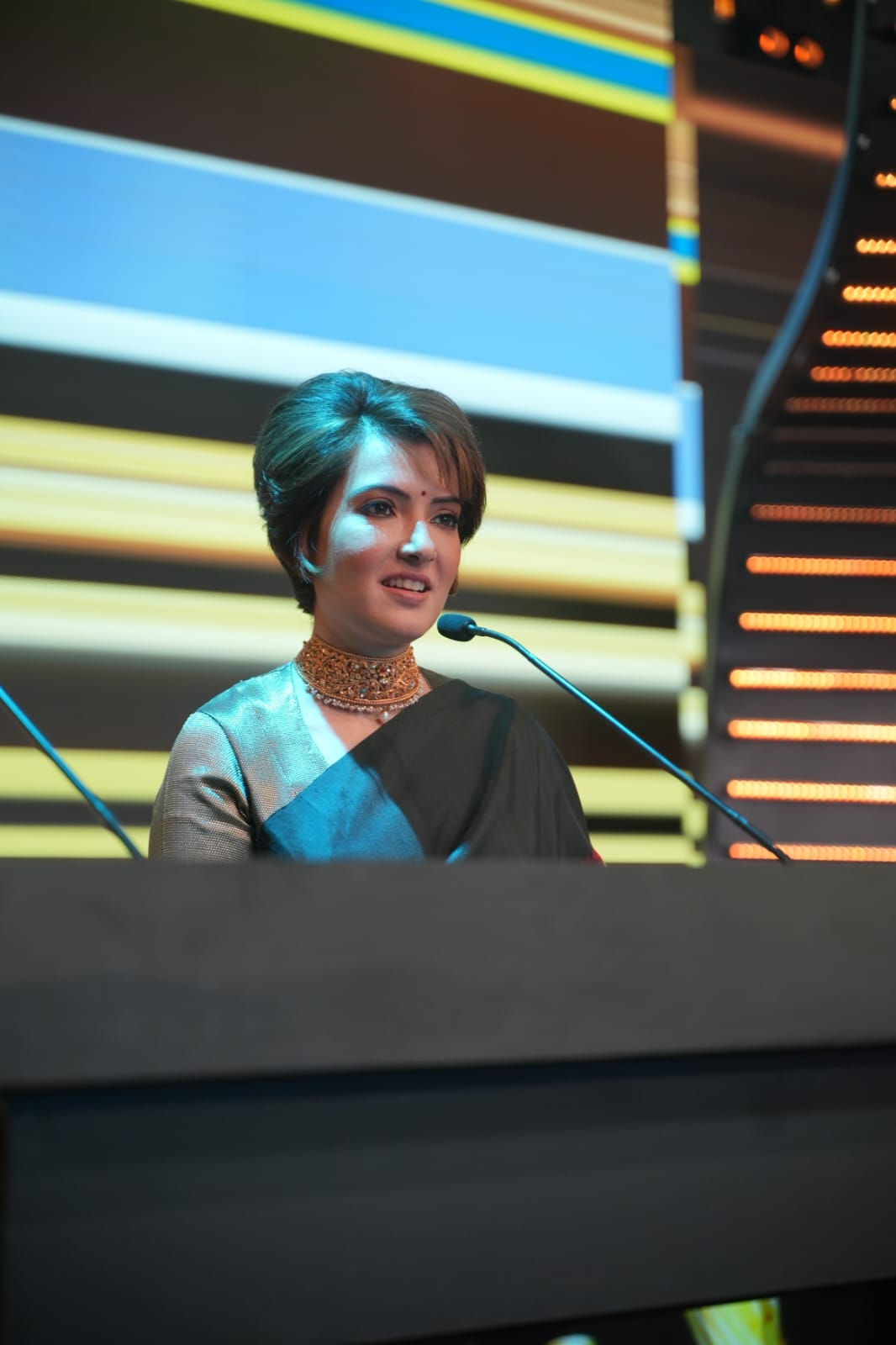
- Arpita Pal in 2023
- Born: 1 October 1979 (age 46); Kolkata, West Bengal, India
- Occupation: Actress
- Spouse: Prosenjit Chatterjee (m. 2002)
- Children: 1

Arpita Chatterjee (née Pal; born 1 October 1979) is an Indian actress, who mostly appears in the Odia and Bengali film industry in India.

She first captured limelight in 1997 when she won ‘Sananda Tilottama,’ the most prestigious beauty pageant in Eastern India, organised by the ABP Group (former awardees include Bipasha Basu and Celina Jaitly). She has been a face on national TV for brands like Fair & Lovely, Yippi Noodles, Lacto Calamine and Shyam Steel.

== Career ==
She made her film debut in 1999 with the film Tumi Ele Tai, directed by Prabhat Roy. Some of the other films she has starred in include Deva, Devdas, Inquilaab, Prem Shakti, Pratarok, Dada Thakur, Pratibad, Utsab and Anupama. After marriage, she took a break from her film career to focus on family life. In 2009, she returned to acting in Ekti Tarar Khonje, directed by Abhik Mukhopadhyay.

She has acted in films of directors like Shakti Samanta and Rituporno Ghosh and has also appeared in commercials for ITC and Saffola. In 2014, she signed for her first Bollywood film Shab, directed by Onir.

She has won multiple awards in Indian and international mainstream and festival circuit. The most notable of these was the Joy Filmfare Award for Best Actor Female (Critics’ Choice) in 2022 for her film Abyakto. Her recent solo musical stage – ‘My Name Is Jaan’ won rich accolades from critics and the media.

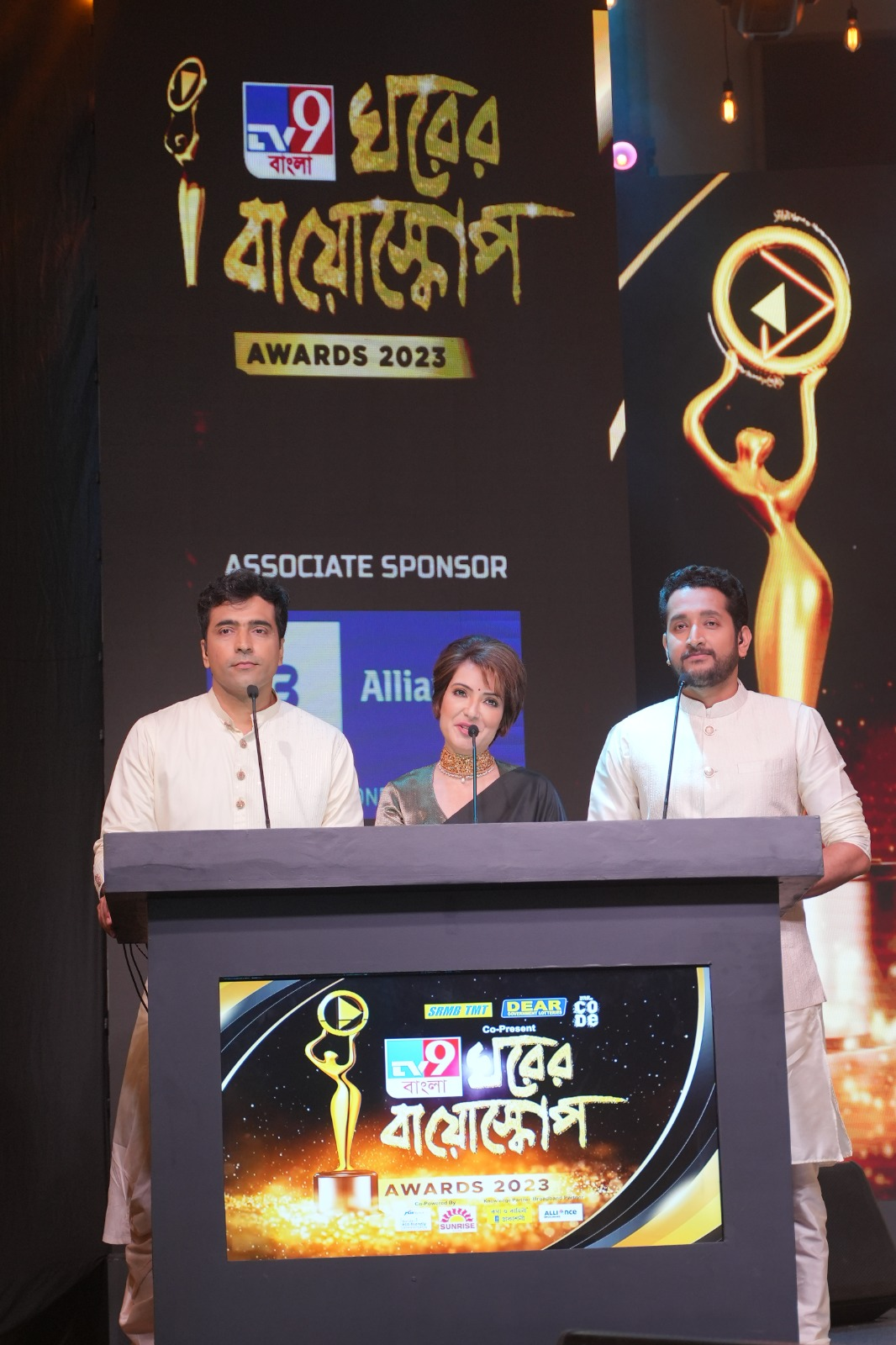
Arpita Pal along with Abir Chatterjee and Parambrata Chatterjee hosting the TV9 Bangla Ghorer Bioscope Awards in 2023

She was the host of the inaugural edition of TV9 Bangla Ghorer Bioscope Awards in 2023 along with Parambrata Chatterjee and Abir Chatterjee.

== Television ==
Year	Show	Co-stars	Role	Channel
2007–present	Dance Bangla Dance	Oindrilla Saha, Mithun Chakraborty, Jisshu Sengupta, Rachana Banerjee, Sonali Chowdhury, June Malia	Judge	Zee Bangla
2010–present	Didi No. 1	Rachana Banerjee	Contestant	Zee Bangla

== Filmography ==
Year	Films	Role	Director	Notes
1999	Tumi Ele Tai	Chaiti	Prabhat Roy	
1999	Asukh	Mrittika	Rituparno Ghosh	
2000	Utsab	Shompa	Rituparno Ghosh	
2001	Pratibad	Jaya	Haranath Chakraborty	
2001	Dada thakur	Mita	Haranath Chakraborty	
2002	Deva	Neela	Sujit Guha	
2002	Inquilaab		Anup Sengupta	
2002	Devdas	Parbati	Shakti Samanta	
2002	Pratarak		Pallav Ghosh	
2002	Annadata		Ravi Kinagi	Cameo
2002	Prem shakti		Mohanji Prasad	
2010	Ekti Tarar Khonje	Rani	Avik Mukhopadhyay	
2010	Laboratory	Neela	Raja Sen	
2013	Satyanweshi	Aloka	Rituparno Ghosh	
2017	Shab	Raina	Onir	Hindi film
2020	Borunbabur Bondhu	-	Anik Dutta	
2020	Abyakto	Saathi	Arjunn Dutta	Filmfare Award for Best Actor Female (Critics’ Choice)
2020	Guldasta	Srirupa Sengupta	Arjunn Dutta	
2021	Habu Chandra Raja Gobu Chandra Montri	Rani Kusumkali	Aniket Chattopadhyay	
2021	Avijatrik	Leela	Subhrajit Mitra	
2022	Abar Bochhor Koori Pore	Bonnie	Srimanta Senguptta	
2022	Abar Kanchanjangha	Shimonti	Raajhorshee De	
2022	Hridpindo	Arjya	Shieladitya Moulik	

== Other Ventures ==
For more than a decade, under the banner of her first production house 'Idea Creations', she produced several popular fiction, non-fiction, and feature film formats hosted by media giants such as Zee, Star, and Colors in Bengal. She then turned her focus to entrepreneurship and set up a Delhi-based health-tech startup in partnership with an eminent media personality. Her startup raised funds and was acquired by TV9 Network.

Arpita now runs her newly launched Delhi-based production house – Studio9 – which is supported by TV9 Network.

== Personal life ==
She is married to actor Prosenjit Chatterjee and has a son named Trishanjit Chatterjee, who the couple fondly call 'Mishuk'.
