= Ditipriya Roy =

Indian Bengali actress

- Born: 11 August 2002 (age 24); Kolkata, West Bengal, India
- Education: Patha Bhavan, Kolkata
- Alma mater: Asutosh College; Sister Nivedita University
- Occupation: Actress
- Notable work: Karunamoyee Rani Rashmoni

Ditipriya Roy (born 11 August 2002) is an Indian television, film and theatre actress working in Bengali-language films and serials. She is best known for portraying the lead role of Rani Rashmoni in the television series Karunamoyee Rani Rashmoni. She has also acted in critically acclaimed movies including Avijatrik (2021), Bob Biswas (2021), Aay Khuku Aay (2022), Kolkata Chalantika (2022), and Achena Uttam (2022).

Roy made her web series debut with Rudrabinar Obhishaap in 2021. She regularly portrays roles of different aspect goddesses of Devi Durga in the Mahisasuramardini programs aired on Zee Bangla on the day of Mahalaya every year.

== Personal life ==
Her father Aloke Shankar Roy is a veterinary doctor and actor.

She passed her higher secondary examination in 2020 with 82.4% marks. She was a student in the department of sociology at Asutosh College.

Currently, she is doing a masters in sociology from Sister Nivedita University.

She is currently dating Chennaiyin goalkeeper Samik Mitra.

== Career ==
Ditipriya started her career in television as a child artist in daily television soaps like Durga, Aparajito, Byomkesh, Bamakhyapa, Tomay Amay Mile and Tare Ami Chokhe Dekhini. In 2015, she got a major breakthrough with Rajkahini directed by Srijit Mukherji. In 2017, she played the protagonist in Bengali television series Karunamoyee Rani Rashmoni which brought her critical acclaim and household popularity, mostly among female viewers. The series was aired on Zee Bangla and has a total of 1,549 episodes. She has made her Bollywood debut in 2021 with the psychic action thriller Bob Biswas.

== Television ==
Year	Show	Channel	Character	Role(s)	Note
2008	Durga	Star Jalsha	Gauri	Supporting role	Debut television series as a child actress
2011–2013	Aparajito	Star Jalsha	Rishita / Titli	Supporting role	
2013	Tomay Amay Mile	Star Jalsha	Young Ushoshi		Played younger version of the lead character in the series
2014	Byomkesh	Colors Bangla	Chingri	Episodic role	
2017–2022	Karunamoyee Rani Rashmoni	Zee Bangla	Rani Rashmoni	Lead role	Debut television series as a senior actress in the lead role
2025	Chirodini Tumi Je Amar	Zee Bangla	Aparna "Apu" Basu	Lead role	Later Replaced by Shirin Paul

=== Reality shows ===
Year	Show	Channel	Character	Ref.
2019	Dadagiri Unlimited	Zee Bangla	Contestant	
2020	Didi No. 1 (Season 8)	Zee Bangla	Contestant	
2021	Dance Bangla Dance (Season 11)	Zee Bangla	Guest performer/host	
2022	Didi No. 1 (Season 9)	Zee Bangla	Contestant-grand opening	

=== Mahalaya ===
Date	Show	Character	Channel	Ref.
2018	Shaktirupeno	Devi Parvati and Devi Mahishasurmardini	Zee Bangla	
2019	12 Mashe 12 Rupe Debibaran	Devi Durgamnashini Durga	Zee Bangla	
2020	Durga Saptasati Sambhavami Yuge Yuge	Devi Parvati and Devi Durgamnashini Durga	Zee Bangla	
2021	Jago Maa Durga	Devi Mahishasurmardini	Star Jalsha	
2023	Nobopotrikaye Debiboron	Devi Parvati, Devi Mahasaraswati, Devi Mahalakshmi, Devi Mahakali	Zee Bangla	
2026	Abhoyashakti-Juge Juge Aparajita	Devi Parvati, Devi Ugrachandi, Devi Bhadrakali, Devi Mahisasuramardini	Sun Bangla	

== Filmography ==
Year	Film	Role	Director	Language	Ref
2014	Biye Not Out		Abhijit Guha, Sudeshna Roy	Bengali	
2015	Rajkahini	Buchki	Srijit Mukherji	Bengali	
2016	Dev: I Love You	Chaapa	Abhimanyu Mukherjee	Bengali	
2021	Avijatrik	Aparna	Subhrajit Mitra	Bengali	
2021	Bob Biswas	Tina	Diya Annapurna Ghosh	Hindi	
2022	Aay Khuku Aay	Satabdi/Buri	Sauvik Kundu	Bengali	
2022	Achena Uttam	Sabitri Chatterjee	Atanu Bose	Bengali	
2022	Kolkata Chalantika	Ador Mukherjee	Pavel	Bengali	
2022	Stories on the Next Page		Brinda Mitra	Bengali	
2023	Bogla Mama Jug Jug Jiyo	Madhuja	Dhrubo Banerjee	Bengali	
2025	Pataligunjer Putul Khela	Rai	Subhankar Chattopadhyay	Bengali	
2025	Jodi Emon Hoto	Jiya	Rabindra Nambiar	Bengali	
2025	Dear D †	TBA	Rabindra Nambiar	Bengali	

== Web series ==
Year	Film	Role	Platform	Director	Language	Note	Ref.
2021	Rudrabinar Obhishaap	Saaz	Hoichoi	Joydeep Mukherjee	Bengali	Debut web series, Season 1 (Part 1 & 2)	
2022	Mukti	Minu	ZEE5	Rohan Ghosh	Bengali		
2022	Bodhon	Shinjini	Hoichoi	Aditi Roy	Bengali		
2023	Dakghor	Manjuri	Hoichoi	Abhrajit Sen	Bengali		
2023	Rajneeti	Rashi	Hoichoi	Sourav Chakraborty	Bengali		

== Music videos ==
Year	Video	Director(s)	Singer(s)	Composer(s)	Music label
2022	Dekhechhi Rupshagore	Sayan Biswas	Mahtim Shakib	Dev Arijit	SVF Music

== Awards ==
Roy has received the following awards:

Year	Award	Category	Character	Film/TV show
2018	Zee Bangla Sonar Sansar Awards 2018	Best Actress	Rani Rashmoni	Karunamoyee Rani Rashmoni
2018	Zee Bangla Sonar Sansar Awards 2018	Facebook Popular Face Zee Bangla	Rani Rashmoni	Karunamoyee Rani Rashmoni
2019	Zee Bangla Sonar Sansar Awards 2019	Priyo Maa	Rani Rashmoni	Karunamoyee Rani Rashmoni
2019	Zee Bangla Sonar Sansar Awards 2019	Sonar Juti (with Gazi Abdun Noor)	Rani Rashmoni- Rajchandra	Karunamoyee Rani Rashmoni
2019	Telly Academy Awards 2019	Best Actress	Rani Rashmoni	Karunamoyee Rani Rashmoni
2020	Zee Bangla Sonar Sansar Awards 2020	Best Actress	Rani Rashmoni	Karunamoyee Rani Rashmoni
2021	Zee Bangla Sonar Sansar Awards 2021	Best Actress	Rani Rashmoni	Karunamoyee Rani Rashmoni
2021	Bochorer Sera Award	Best Actress	Rani Rashmoni	Karunamoyee Rani Rashmoni
2022	Anandalok Puraskar 2022	Best Actress Television	Rani Rashmoni	Karunamoyee Rani Rashmoni
2022	WBFJA Awards	Best Actor in a Leading Role (Female)	Manjuri	Dakghor
2023	TV 9 Bangla Ghorer Bioscope	Best Actor in a Supporting Role (Female)	Shinjini	Bodhon
2025	Telly Academy Awards 2025	Favourite Daughter	Aparna	Chirodini Tumi Je Amar

== Host ==
Year	Award	Co-host
2021	Zee Bangla Sonar Sansar Awards	Abir Chatterjee
2021	Dance Bangla Dance	Vikram Chatterjee
