= Chorabali =

Chorabali (lit. 'stolen sand') may refer to:

- "Chorabali", a 1933 Byomkesh Bakshi story by Indian writer Sharadindu Bandyopadhyay
- Chorabali (2016 film), an Indian Bengali-language suspense thriller film adaptation of Cards on the Table by Agatha Christie
- Chorabali (2012 film), a Bangladeshi action thriller film
