= Begum Jaan (2017 film) =

2017 Indian film by Srijit Mukherji

- Film poster
- Directed by: Srijit Mukherji
- Written by: Kausar Munir (Dialogue)
- Screenplay by: Srijit Mukherji; Kausar Munir
- Story by: Sumair Malik
- Based on: Rajkahini
- Produced by: Mukesh Bhatt; Vishesh Bhatt; Mahendra Soni; Shrikant Mohta
- Starring: Vidya Balan; Ila Arun; Naseeruddin Shah; Rajit Kapoor; Ashish Vidyarthi; Vivek Mushran; Chunky Pandey; Gauahar Khan; Pallavi Sharda; Mishti
- Narrated by: Amitabh Bachchan
- Cinematography: Gopi Bhagat
- Edited by: Monisha R. Baldawa; Vivek Mishra
- Music by: Anu Malik (songs); Indraadip Dasgupta (Background score)
- Production companies: Vishesh Films; Shree Venkatesh Films; Play Entertainments; Khurana Productions
- Distributed by: NH Studioz (India); White Hill Studios (North America); Magic Cloud (Overseas)
- Release date: 14 April 2017
- Running time: 127 minutes
- Country: India
- Language: Hindi
- Budget: ₹19 crore
- Box office: ₹30.6 crore

Begum Jaan is a 2017 Indian Hindi period drama film. It is directed and co-written by National Film Award-winning director Srijit Mukherji in his Hindi directional debut and produced by Mukesh Bhatt, Vishesh Bhatt and Play Entertainment. The film is co-produced by Sakshi Bhatt and Shree Venkatesh Films with executive producer Kumkum Saigal. The cinematography is done by Gopi Bhagat. Lyrics, additional screenplay and dialogues have been penned by Kausar Munir and Rahat Indori.

The film was released on 14 April 2017. Vidya Balan plays the lead role of a brothel's madam, set against the backdrop of the Independence movement of India and Pakistan in 1947. It is a Hindi remake of the Bengali film Rajkahini (2015). The film managed to recover its costs and was declared "average" commercially.

== Plot ==
The movie opens with a small family and a young couple travelling in public transport late at night. While the family is alighting at their stop, a group of drunk goons gets into the bus and harasses the couple and tries to rape the woman; an elderly woman saves the girl, undressing herself. The movie then goes back to 1947. In August 1947, after India sought independence from the British, the Last Viceroy of India, Mountbatten, gave Cyril Radcliffe the responsibility of dividing India into two parts – India and Pakistan. Radcliffe drew two lines – one in Punjab and another in Bengal. This line was known as the Radcliffe Line.

After several failed attempts by British officials to convince Begum Jaan and her team to leave despite giving them a month's notice, as a last resort, Hari and Ilyas enlist the help of Kabir, an infamous killer in Sonapur, to threaten Begum with her members to vacate the brothel. Kabir proceeds to kill Begum's beloved dogs, even feeding their meat to Begum and her girls. Raja Sahib returns to the brothel one day to inform Begum Jaan that his efforts to save her brothel have failed and now she must vacate the brothel. Begum, who was hopeful of help from Raja Sahib, is shocked and dismayed. Still, she stubbornly tells Raja Sahib, come what may, she'd rather die in her house like a queen than die on the streets like a beggar. As a result of Kabir's intimidation tactics, Begum asks Salim to train every one of her girls to use weapons and fight back. Intensive training practice sessions are held. Kabir then kills Sujeet while he is returning from the market with a few girls of the brothel. He persuades the girls to escape while sacrificing his life. This killing enrages Begum Jaan and her members further.

Meanwhile, Masterji, Laadli's teacher, is in love with Begum Jaan and proposes to her, unaware that another prostitute named Gulabo harbours feelings for him. Begum Jaan rejects his proposal and asks him to leave, leading an irate Masterji to concoct a plan to kill her. He convinces Gulabo to run away from the brothel, betraying Begum Jaan. Gulabo does so, but Masterji spurns her and gets her raped by his accomplices inside a horse carriage. She vows vengeance.

On the night of partition, Kabir and his men attacked the brothel. Laadli, her mother, and Shabnam are forced to run away and are attacked by the policeman, Shyam Singh, who seeks benefit from them, but Laadli undresses herself, which reminds him of his ten-year-old daughter, and he cries and asks her to stop. Begum and the girls fight back, but to no avail. Gulabo returns and later slits Masterji's throat while he is witnessing the attack on the brothel by Kabir and his goons. However, she has been badly assaulted by Masterji's accomplices and dies. The goons throw lighted torches inside the brothel, causing the building to be engulfed in flames. Begum Jaan and her girls put up a determined fight. Many are killed. She and her four surviving members smile while looking at their home being set ablaze; they walk inside the building and shut the doors. They burn to death as Amma narrates the story of Rani Padmavati of Chittorgarh, who refused to fall into the hands of the enemy and instead martyred herself and died a valiant death, just like Begum Jaan.

As the movie ends, Ilyas and Hari are seen to be remorseful of their actions; Ilyas shoots himself, and we are shown the remains of the brothel and the end to the Begum Jaan legacy. In the present, the old lady turned out to be Laadli, who undressed herself to save the couple; upon seeing her, the goons run away in fear. As the goons flee, a very old Laadli leaves by supporting the injured couple.

== Cast ==
- Vidya Balan as Begum Jaan
- Ila Arun as Amma
- Gauahar Khan as Rubina
- Pallavi Sharda as Gulabo
- Priyanka Setia as Jameela
- Ridheema Tiwari as Amba
- Flora Saini as Maina
- Raviza Chauhan as Lata
- Poonam Rajput as Rani
- Mishti Chakraborty as Shabnam
- Gracy Goswami as Laadli
- Pitobash Tripathy as Surjeet
- Sumit Nijhawan as Salim
- Ashish Vidyarthi as Hari Prasad
- Chunky Panday as Kabir
- Rajit Kapur as Iliyas Khan
- Vivek Mushran as Masterji
- Rajesh Sharma as Shyam
- Naseeruddin Shah as Raja Sahib
- Ashok Dhanuka as Sardar Vallabhbhai Patel
- Sanjay Gurbaxani as Jawaharlal Nehru
- Dicky Banerjee as Muhammad Ali Jinnah
- Patrick Eyre as Lord Mountbatten
- Steve Burroughs as Hastings Ismay
- Raja Biswas as Cyril Radcliffe
- Dilip Dave as an old customer of Gulabo

=== Characters ===
Actor	Character in Begum Jaan	Actor/ Character in Rajkahini
Vidya Balan	Begum Jaan	Rituparna Sengupta
Ila Arun	Amma	Lily Chakravarty
Gauahar Khan	Rubina	Jaya Ahsan
Pallavi Sharda	Gulabo	Parno Mittra (Golap)
Priyanka Setia	Jameela	Sudipta Chakraborty (Juthika)
Raviza Chauhan	Lata	Priyanka Sarkar
Ridheema Tiwari	Amba	Saayoni Ghosh (Koli)
Flora Saini	Maina	Sohini Sarkar (Duli)
Mishti	Shabnam	Ridhima Ghosh (Fatima/ Shabnam)
Poonam Rajput	Rani	Ena Saha (Banno)
Gracy Goswami	Laadli	Ditipriya Roy (Bunchki)
Sumit Nijhawan	Salim Mirza	Nigel Akkara
Vivek Mushran	Master	Abir Chatterjee
Ashish Vidyarthi	Hari Prasad	Saswata Chatterjee (Prafulla Sen)
Rajit Kapoor	Ilyas Khan	Kaushik Sen (Muhammad Ilyas)
Chunkey Pandey	Kabir	Jisshu Sengupta
Naseeruddin Shah	Raja Sahib	Rajatava Dutta (Nawab)
Pitobash Tripathy	Surjeet	Rudranil Ghosh (Sujan)
Rajesh Sharma	Shyam	Kanchan Mullick (Shashi Babu)

== Production ==
This film is the remake of a Bengali film, Rajkahini, which was released in 2015. Principal photography of the film began in June 2016 and was completed in August 2016 in Ranishwar block of Dumka district in Jharkhand.

== Soundtrack ==
Begum Jaan

Soundtrack album by Anu Malik
- Released: 14 March 2017
- Genre: Feature film soundtrack
- Length: 26:29
- Language: Hindi
- Labels: Times Music; Saregama (for "Woh Subah")

Anu Malik chronology
Shubh Mangal Savdhan (2017)	Begum Jaan (2017)
External audio
- Audio Jukebox on YouTube

The music for the film is composed by Anu Malik and Kausar Munir has written the lyrics for songs. The soundtrack was released by Times Music. Prem Mein Tohre, sung by Asha Bhosle, was launched on 14 February 2017 to high praise. For the second song, Aazaadiyan brought together Sonu Nigam and Rahat Fateh Ali Khan. The full music album was released on 6 April 2017. On 9 April 2017, the sixth song of this album, "Woh Subah" was released. This song is a recreated version of the song "Woh Subah Kabhi To Aayegi" from the 1958 Bollywood movie, Phir Subah Hogi, composed by Khayyam and written by Sahir Ludhiyanvi. The original song was voiced by Mukesh and Asha Bhosle, while the new version had the voices of Arijit Singh and Shreya Ghoshal. On 12 April 2017, the last song of this album, "Murshida", was released as a "bonus track". This song is penned by Rahat Indori and sung by Arijit Singh.

All lyrics are written by Kausar Munir; all music is composed by Anu Malik.

No.	Title	Singer(s)	Length
1.	"Prem Mein Tohre"	Asha Bhosle	3:58
2.	"Aazaadiyan"	Sonu Nigam, Rahat Fateh Ali Khan	6:41
3.	"O Re Kaharo"	Kalpana Patowary, Altamash Faridi	5:48
4.	"Holi Khelein"	Shreya Ghoshal, Anmol Malik	6:03
5.	"Prem Mein Tohre (Reprise)"	Kavita Seth	3:58
6.	"Woh Subah"	Arijit Singh, Shreya Ghoshal	4:15
7.	"Murshida"	Arijit Singh	5:25
Total length:			36:08

== Marketing ==
The first look of the movie introducing Vidya Balan as Begum Jaan was launched on 3 March 2017. The second poster of the movie was launched on 14 April 2017. The trailer of the movie was launched on 14 March 2017 to much critical and commercial acclaim. The trailer crossed 20 million views on Facebook and YouTube within a weeks time.

== Reception ==
As of June 2020, the film holds a 10% approval rating on review aggregator Rotten Tomatoes, based on ten reviews with an average rating of 3.86/10.

The film received mixed to negative reviews from critics. Meena Iyer of The Times of India gave the film a rating of 3.5 out of 5 and said that, "Vidya invests fully in Begum and her dialogue-baazi (a lot of which is raunchy) will get ceetis (whistles). However, the writer-director's interest level in everything else, falters." Rohit Vats of the Hindustan Times gave the film a rating of 2.5 out of 5 saying that, "The 134-minute long Begum Jaan has Vidya Balan in good form, but it lacks cohesiveness as a complete story. It shies away from delving deep into the theme, but you may appreciate its documentary-like feel." Raja Sen of NDTV gave the film a rating of 1 out of 5 and said that, "It is very difficult to take the highly cheesy Begum Jaan seriously, and the film squanders the talent of Vidya Balan". Namrata Joshi of The Hindu criticised the film saying that, "Each scene feels consciously staged than unprompted and the flow from one sequence to the next is perennially jerky leading to way too much chaos on- screen." Rajeev Masand of News18 gave the film a rating of 2 out of 5 saying that, "The film has an interesting premise and Vidya is commanding as the feared brothel owner who lords over her home. What lets it down is the shrill treatment." Rajyasree Sen of Live Mint criticised the film saying that, "Srijit Mukherji's magnum opus 'Begum Jaan' is an utter travesty to feminism, cinema and female actors in the Hindi film industry".

Shubhra Gupta of The Indian Express gave the film a rating of 1.5 out of 5 and said that, "Such a waste of a talented bunch of actors. And of Balan, who tries hard to invest some feeling into a role which turns into a cliché the moment the film opens." Saibal Chatterjee of NDTV praised the performance of Vidya Balan saying that, "Vidya Balan could count this performance as another feather in her already overflowing cap" but found the film to be "passable at best". The critic gave the film a rating of 2.5 out of 5 and said that, "A potentially explosive idea lost in banshee-like shrillness, rapid-fire storytelling and much volatility triggered by a collision of history and hysteria: that in a nutshell is Begum Jaan". Sukanya Verma of Rediff criticised the film saying that, "Full of histrionics and misandry, Begum Jaan shows little understanding of the trauma and impasse afflicting those in its grip." The critic gave the film a rating of 2 out of 5 and concluded her review by saying that, "In its preoccupation with drama, Begum Jaan neglects to reveal its soul. As a consequence, you feel nothing for the characters, their cause or fate." Suhani Singh of India Today criticised the film saying that, "Begum Jaan for all its good intent is a misfire of epic proportions."
