= Guldasta =

Guldasta (lit. 'bouquet') may refer to:

- Guldasta (2011 film), a 2011 Indian Marathi-language film
- Guldasta (2020 film), a 2020 Indian Bengali-language film
