= Malobika Banerjee =

Bengali actress

- Born: Malobika Banerjee; Kolkata
- Education: Calcutta University
- Occupation: Actress
- Years active: 2008 - Present

Malobika Banerjee is a Bengali actress performed in Oriya films also.She also participated in Bigg Boss Bangla

== Career ==
In 2018 Malobika Banerjee started her Bollywood career with a Hindi music video named “Dilbar” singer Shahid Mallya from Zee music label. On 2018 she worked another super hit music video “Pretty Girl” singer Kanika kapoor from T- series music label. In 2018 Malobika Banerjee featured in cover page of Famous Filmfare magazine. She acted in movies like Chorabali, Katmundu and Mister Bhaduri. She has also done Odia movies such as Mate bohu kari Nei ja, Dele Dhara katha Sare.

== Filmography ==
| Year | Film | Director |
|---|---|---|
| 2011 | Mr. Funtoosh | Raj Mukherjee |
| 2011 | Bhalobasa Jindabad | Reshmi Mitra |
| 2011 | Kokhono Biday bolo na | S.K.Murlidharan |
| 2011 | Katakuti | Premangshu Roy |
| 2012 | Mate bohu kari Nei ja (Oriya) | Chowdhury Bikash Das |
| 2013 | Mistake | S.K. |
| 2014 | Sada Canvas | Subrata Sen |
| 2015 | Boudi.com | Raj Mukherjee |
| 2015 | Professional | Joydeep Mukherjee |
| 2015 | Katmundu | Raj Chakraborty |
| 2016 | Chorabali | Subhrajit Mitra |
| 2016 | The Best seller | Suman Moitra |
| 2016 | Mister Bhaduri | Subrata Sen |
| 2016 | Dele Dhara katha Sare(Oriya) | Sailendra Mishra |
| 2017 | Tope | Buddhadeb Dasgupta |

2018 Badmash Toka (Oriya)||Prem Anand
