= Paroma Banerji =

Bengali singer and television anchor

- Occupations: Singer, Television anchor

Paroma Banerji (Note: Spelling according to subject's website) is a Bengali singer and television anchor, well known for hosting the Bengali television show Rojgere Ginni.

== Discography ==
- Ghore Pherar Gaan

=== Collaboration albums ===
- Aabaar Bochhor Kuri Pore (1995)

== Filmography ==
Playback singer

- Elar Char Adhyay (2012)
- Bhuter Bhabishyat (2012)
- Nouka Dubi (2011)
- Narak Guljar (2009)
- Chaturanga (2008)
- Khela (2008)

=== Television ===
ETV Bangla

- Rojgere Ginni
- Ebong Rituparno
- Sudhu Tomari Jonyo

Zee Bangla

- Labonyer Sangsar

Rupashi Bangla

- Sonay Sohaga
