= Rajkahini =

2015 Indian Bengali film

- Movie poster
- Directed by: Srijit Mukherji
- Produced by: Shree Venkatesh Films
- Starring: Rituparna Sengupta; Saswata Chatterjee; Kaushik Sen; Jaya Ahsan; Jisshu Sengupta; Abir Chatterjee; Sudipta Chakraborty; Lily Chakravarty; Parno Mittra; Saayoni Ghosh; Priyanka Sarkar; Sohini Sarkar; Ridhima Ghosh; Ditipriya Roy; Ena Saha; Rudranil Ghosh; Kanchan Mullick; Biswajit Chakraborty; Nigel Akkara; Rajatava Dutta; Shataf Figar
- Cinematography: Abhik Mukhopadhyay
- Edited by: Srijit Mukherji; Pranoy Dasgupta
- Music by: Indraadip Das Gupta
- Distributed by: Shree Venkatesh Films
- Release date: 16 October 2015
- Running time: 160 minutes
- Country: India
- Language: Bengali
- Budget: ₹3.5 crore
- Box office: ₹7 crore

Rajkahini (transl. Tale of Kings, can also be called Tale of the Raj) is an Indian Bengali-language epic period action drama film directed by Srijit Mukherji. The shooting of the film was completed in June 2015 and the film was released on 16 October 2015. The film has an ensemble cast of eleven major female characters led by Rituparna Sengupta and also stars Saswata Chatterjee, Kaushik Sen, Jisshu Sengupta, Abir Chatterjee and Jaya Ahsan in other pivotal roles. The film was a critical and commercial success. It has since then been remade in Hindi by Mukherji as Begum Jaan.

== Plot ==
In June 1947, the British passed a bill regarding the partition of Bengal. Delving into the grim history of the Partition, Srijit's movie Rajkahini is weaved around a border between the two nations that runs through a brothel housing eleven women. Bengal was broken up twice (1905, and then during Independence) - officially for demographic reasons and ease of administration - but actually, it was a strictly political move to curtail Bengal politics. The narrative follows the erection of the Radcliffe Line as the boundary between the newly formed nations of India and East Pakistan (present day Bangladesh). As both the Congress and the Muslim League battle it out in courtrooms as to which side of Bengal will get which territory, in another part of Bengal is a brothel, situated right in the middle of Debiganj and Haldibari districts, which is the home and the world to eleven women and two men. Begum Jaan is the boss, while the other women work under her as prostitutes. Begum's faithful bodyguard is Saleem Mirza, a Pathan, and Sujan as their man-servant and entertainer. Begum Jaan is not concerned about Hindustan or Pakistan, her only concern is her business, which is running badly because of the partition and resulting riots. The local master and Congress worker visits the brothel time to time with gifts for everyone.

Meanwhile, the political sky is darkening. The Radcliffe line passes between Debiganj and Haldibari, the former being placed in East Pakistan, and the latter remaining in India. Mr. Profullo Sen from Congress and Mr. Ilias from Muslim League (who were childhood friends but now separated) meet and discuss about the relocation of the people of the two districts. They discover that in its course, the boundary line has been drawn right through the middle of Begum Jaan's brothel. They meet Begum Jaan and tell her to evacuate her brothel along with her women, who refuses to budge. Meanwhile, the Nawab of Rangpur was relocating with his family and followers to West Bengal, where he stayed at the brothel for a night. Begum Jaan complained to him about Mr. Sen and Mr. Ilias, to get them out of their respective parties. After visiting Delhi for the meeting of the rulers of the Princely States, he informed Begum that he is not an influential person anymore, and the Princely States were being integrated in the Indian Union, and the titles were being abolished. Begum decided to fight her own battle.

Exasperated at the futile attempts to evict Begum and her women from the house, Prafulla and Ilias turn to Kabir, leader of a criminal gang, for help. Kabir and his gang commits all kinds of heinous crimes in these turbulent times of riots and violence. They chase Sujan and three other girls who were returning from the market. While Sujan manages to save the girls and help them escape, he himself gets butchered by Kabir. Sujan's death adds fuel to the fire in Begum's heart and they decide to have a final confrontation. Meanwhile, after being rejected by Begum Jaan, Master manages to trap a girl into his schemes of getting back at Begum. He joins forces with Kabir and Prafulla. Ilias was dissatisfied with Kabir's ways but accepted the events as necessary for getting the job done.

That night, Kabir and his gang set fire to the brothel. The women, trained to use rifles by Saleem, put up a brave fight. Most of them get killed, however Saleem himself dies the most horrifying death. After the bloodbath, the remaining women including Begum enter the inferno of the house and willingly accept their death in their own "country", while being narrated the story of the legendary Rani Padmini of Rajputana.

When dawn breaks, the house and its inmates have been burnt to dust. The film ends with Ilias, Prafulla, Master and lakhs of refugees from Debiganj and Haldibari coming together to see the remains of Begum Jaan's brothel, as Bharata Bhagya Bidhata plays in the background.

== Cast ==
- Rituparna Sengupta as Begum Jaan
- Lily Chakravarty as Kamala aka Thamma
- Sudipta Chakraborty as Juthika aka Juhi
- Jaya Ahsan as Rubina
- Saayoni Ghosh as Koli
- Sohini Sarkar as Duli
- Parno Mittra as Golaap
- Priyanka Sarkar as Lata aka Bostumi
- Ridhima Ghosh as Fatima/Shabnam
- Ena Saha as Banno
- Ditipriya Roy as Nolok aka Bunchki
- Saswata Chatterjee as Mr. Profullo Mohan Sen
- Kaushik Sen as Mr. Muhammad Ilias
- Nigel Akkara as Saleem Mirza
- Jisshu Sengupta as Kabir (special appearance)
- Abir Chatterjee as Master
- Rudranil Ghosh as Sujan
- Biswajit Chakraborty as Mr. Akhtar, Inspector-in-charge of Debiganj
- Kanchan Mullick as Mr. Shashikanta, Inspector-in-charge of Haldibari
- Rajatava Dutta as Nawab of Rangpur (special appearance)
- Ashok Dhanuka as Sardar Vallabhbhai Patel
- Sanjay Gurbaxani as Jawaharlal Nehru
- Dicky Banerjee as Muhammad Ali Jinnah
- Patrick Eyre as Louis Mountbatten
- Steve Burroughs as Hastings Ismay
- Raja Biswas as Cyril Radcliffe
- Shataf Figar as lawyer of Pakistan
- Srijit Mukherjee as lawyer of India

== Reception ==
Upam Buzarbaruah, reviewing for the Times of India commented that "...Rajkahini's flaws don't take away from the beauty of the concept or its execution". Shomini Sen of IBNLive concluded that "Despite its glaring flaws and over stretched climax it [Rajkahini] makes for a compelling watch". The film also got a fantastic reception in the Film Festival circuit. It was the official selection at the International Film Festival of India at Goa in the Indian panorama section, Mumbai International Film Festival (MAMI), Imagine India Film Festival at Madrid, Hidden Gems Film Festival in Calgary, Sydney Indian Film Festival, Chennai International Film Festival, All Lights International Film Festival at Kochi, I-Views International Film Festival at Delhi, International Film Festival of Trichur, Habitat International Film Festival at Delhi and competitive sections at the New York Indian Film Festival, International Film Festival of Kerala, Delhi International Film Festival and Melbourne Indian Film Festival. Rituparna Sengupta won the Best Actress for her performance at the Delhi International Film Festival along nominations at New York Indian Film Festival and Melbourne Indian Film Festival.

== Remake ==
A Hindi adaptation, Begum Jaan, made by Mukherji and starring Vidya Balan with an ensemble cast, released in April 2017.

== Soundtrack ==
Track listing
No.	Title	Singer	Length
1.	"Bharoto Bhagyo Bidhata"	Kabir Suman, Kaushiki Chakraborty, Rupankar Bagchi, Lopamudra Mitra & Others	6:06
2.	"Jiya Maane Na"	Rekha Bhardwaj	3:51
3.	"Saanson Se"	Rekha Bhardwaj
4.	"Shokhi Rongo Kato Bol"	Lagnajita Chakraborty
