= Avijatrik =

2021 Indian Bengali-language film

- Avijatrik Poster
- Directed by: Subhrajit Mitra
- Screenplay by: Subhrajit Mitra
- Based on: Aparajito by Bibhutibhushan Bandyopadhyay
- Produced by: Gaurang Jalan; Madhur Bhandarkar; NCKS Explorations
- Starring: Arjun Chakrabarty; Sabyasachi Chakraborty; Arpita Chatterjee; Ditipriya Roy
- Cinematography: Supratim Bhol
- Edited by: Sujay Datta Ray
- Music by: Bickram Ghosh; Title track Sitar by Anoushka Shankar
- Production companies: Gaurang Films; Bhandarkar Entertainment
- Distributed by: SSR Cinemas
- Release dates: January 2021 (Kolkata); 26 November 2021
- Country: India
- Language: Bengali

Avijatrik is a 2021 Bengali-language drama film, written and directed by Subhrajit Mitra and produced by Gaurang Jalan, co-produced by Madhur Bhandarkar. The screenplay is based on the novel Aparajito by Bibhutibhushan Bandyopadhyay. The film was released under the banner of Gaurang Films and Bhandarkar Entertainment. This is a sequel and the concluding part of Satyajit Ray's Apu Trilogy.

The film premiered at the Kolkata International Film Festival in January 2021. It was released theatrically on 3 December 2021.

== Plot ==
=== Synopsis ===
Avijatrik is essentially the story of a journey depicting Apu's ardor to be a globetrotter, to experience the outside world and immerse himself in myriad layers of life. The story revolves around a sublime bond between a father (Apu) and his 6-year-old son (Kajol) – wherein both are dependent on each other – heaping lavish affection and love for each other. The film has explored the beautiful tapestry of pure interpersonal relationships to recreate the magic of Apu– sharing adventures with his beloved son, Kajol.

Apu is a warm & affectionate father to Kajol who lost his dear mother to an unpropitious fate during his birth. Aparna, Apu's late wife still exists in his surreal space—a space where he involves himself in eternal philosophical discourses with his beloved.

Apu and Kajol start journeying to the northern part of India from Kolkata since Apu had just taken up a job as a resident teacher in an opulent estate. This journey creates an unfading and everlasting mark in Apu's heart as he chances upon his childhood sweetheart Leela, an astounding beauty whom he accidentally meets after ages. Leela, with her declining health is going to visit her daughter who stays with her grandmother in Benaras. Her marriage proved to be painful. Apu comes across a deserted and forlorn Leela; but loses her forever in few hours' times. Confessing her love for Apu, Leela succumbs to her illness and breathes her last in his arms. Apu is compelled to get down from the train to keep his promise of visiting Leela's mother and daughter in Benaras. As always, train (metaphor of a journey of life from one destination to another) and death once again play a pivotal catalyst in Apu's life.

As destiny desired, he meets Shankar in Benaras. Shankar is a middle-aged globetrotter who is an illustrious character immortalized by Bibhutibhushan Bandopadhyay in another epic novel. Shankar is visiting some old Indian cities to explore the collective consciousness of this ancient civilization. Apu and Kajol are enthralled by his buoyant spirit of adventure and his ebullient soul-searching quest. Shankar triggers the passion of wanderlust in them and invites Apu to join him for his excavation tour to Borobodur the following month. Apu politely asks for some time to consider such a marvelous offer. He is worried about the safety and future of Kajol in an unknown land, though he harbors the vivacious spirit to see the world. The excitement is surging and pulsating in his veins, and he longs to set out on a timeless and adventurous journey.

This bohemian nature of Apu nudges him to forsake his job in North India. He soon returns to Calcutta for some time but suddenly falls ill. Young Kajol nurses his ailing father with utmost love and care. On the other hand, the ramifications of World War II and the armed freedom movements in India have also created havoc and precariousness in the streets of Calcutta. Apu's disquiet and fearful apprehensions about the well-being of Kajol prompts him to join Shankar and take his son away from this mayhem.

Before leaving his motherland Apu takes Kajol to his ancestral home at Nischindipur, for the very last time to revive and relive his childhood memories. There he meets his distant cousin sister Ranu and the rest of his relatives. Apu, for the last time, feels at home, at peace with himself amongst his near and dear ones in Nischindipur. He meets them after decades and showers immense affection on them, so as to feel contented at that juncture of his life. Apu also feels the tender presence of his long-gone sister Durga in Ranu. He is delighted to feel the same fondness for Ranu as he did for his own sister Durga years ago. Kajol is equally loved and adored by everybody and soaks in the lap of their affection. Apu basks in the glory of his childhood sweet memories and the present moments, amidst his very own people.

For Apu, life has come full circle as he lives his moments through his son Kajol. Yearning for more adventure, he finally bids farewell to his village, his city, his motherland and embarks on a spirited journey with Shankar and Kajol on some unknown terrains in search of new beginnings in a faraway land.

== Cast ==
- Arjun Chakrabarty as Apu
- Sabyasachi Chakraborty as Shankar
- Arpita Chatterjee as Leela
- Sreelekha Mitra as Ranudi
- Ditipriya Roy as Aparna
- Tanusree Shankar as Bouranima
- Sohag Sen as Boro didi
- Ayushman Mukherjee as Kajol
- Biswanath Basu as Sotu
- Barun Chanda as Publisher
- Irina Malysheva as Anastasia
- Juergen Thomas Schrod as Herr Mueller
- Sheikh Mahim Edward as Sheikh Edward

== Release ==
The film premiered at the 2021 Kolkata International Film Festival held from 7 to 14 January 2021. The film was screened at London Indian Film Festival on 18 September 2021. It has released theatrically on 3 December 2021.

== Awards ==
68th National Film Awards

- National Film Award for Best Feature Film in Bengali - Subhrajit Mitra
- National Film Award for Best Cinematography - Supratim Bhol
- Bangladesh National Film Award for Best Child Artist - Sheikh Mahim Edward
