= Mon Amour: Shesher Kobita Revisited =

- Movie Poster
- Directed by: Subhrajit Mitra
- Written by: Kaberi Dutta Chatterjee
- Produced by: Men at Work
- Starring: Saheb Chatterjee; Rituparna Sengupta; Tota Roychowdhury
- Music by: Kalyan Sen Barat
- Distributed by: T.Sarkar Productions
- Release date: 8 August 2008
- Running time: 135 minutes
- Country: India
- Language: Bengali

Mon Amour: Shesher Kobita Revisited (Bengali: মন আমুর : শেষের কবিতা রিভিসিটেড "Mon Amour: Shesher Kobita Revisited") is a 2008 Bengali film directed by Subhrajit Mitra. The story is by Kaberi Dutta Chatterjee. The title is in French, Bengali and English. The language is Bengali but the derived culture it presents is global.

== Plot ==
Mon Amour: Shesher Kobita Revisited is an imaginary take-off of an ordinary love triangle with a touch of Shesher Kobita.

Amit is Rajarshi (Saheb Chatterjee), an internationally celebrated film director who is about to make a film called Mon Amour, to be produced by a French production house, a relocation of Tagore's novel to contemporary Kolkata. He comes to Kolkata from London on a brief sabbatical. Lavanya has two identities in this film. She is called Brishti (Rituparna Sengupta), who teaches literature in high school in her real persona, and Tilottama in Rajarshi's imaginary world of dreams, nightmares and memories. Shovanlal is called Indrajeet (Tota Roychoudhury), an industrialist who Brishti married on the rebound when she felt Rajarshi had ditched her to go to London to study filmmaking. The three meet in Rajarshi's rented apartment in Kolkata, where he has come purportedly to scout for his new film but, in reality, to rediscover his past with Brishti, his present with Tilottama, and his friendship with Indrajeet.
