= Tasher Ghawr =

2020 Indian Bengali drama film

- Directed by: Sudipto Roy
- Screenplay by: Sudipto Roy
- Starring: Swastika Mukherjee
- Production company: Chilekotha Films
- Release date: 3 September 2020
- Country: India
- Language: Bengali

Tasher Ghawr is a Bengali film released on 3 September 2020 directly on the OTT platform hoichoi. Directed by Sudipto Roy the series features Swastika Mukherjee in the lead roles.

== Plot ==
This Bengali film is about a housewife of an upper-middle-class family named Sujata who is stuck between the world that is around and within her. The story is about that world: her home, her search, her “self”.

Swastika, who previously worked for various projects for hoichoi including the iconic Dupur Thakurpo and many other series like The Stoneman Murders and Paanch Phoron Season 2 plays the lead role in the film.

The film got released directly on the OTT platform due to the COVID-19 pandemic. The complete movie is shot during the lockdown period in India.

== Cast ==
- Swastika Mukherjee as Sujata
