= Rojgere Ginni =

- Genre: Talk Show/Game show
- Presented by: Paroma Banerji, Madhumanti Maitra, Lajbanti Roy etc.
- Starring: Bengali housewives
- Country of origin: India
- Original language: Bengali

Original release
- Network: ETV Bangla

Rojgere Ginni (English: The Earning Housewife) was one of the longest running Bengali television shows. The show had been telecast for more than 10 years on ETV Bangla. It was a reality show, the main theme of which was promotion of women aged between 18–50.

== Format ==
An anchor hosts the program and conducts light weight chats on different subjects with the housewives, her husband, other family members. Games are also played in the show where the housewives get opportunity to win prize and money.

The program can be divided into five rounds:

- First round: anchor of the show introduces and housewife who is going to participate in that day's episode conducts a chat session with her and finally at the end of the round a game is played– anchor sings a song and the housewife has to answer a question based on the song within 30 seconds. If she can she gets ₹ 1000.
- Second round: Second round consists of another chat session. At the end of the round they play another game based on daily household works where the housewife can win up to ₹ 2000 from this round.
- Third round: In the third round the housewife's husband is introduced. A chat session is conducted with the ginni and her husband. In this round another household work related game is played where the ginni and her husband get opportunity to win up to ₹ 2000.
- Fourth round– Bajar fordo: In the fourth round a game is played with the ginni and five other family members/friends of ginni. This is a memory game. The anchor reads out 10 ingredients with their quantity from a shopping list and after that the participants have to repeat those with exact quantity. If 5 or 6 or 7 are correct, they win ₹ 1000 and if 8 or 9 or 10 are correct, participants can win up to ₹ 2000 from this round.
- Fifth round– Bumper round: This is a family round. In this round a table is set with different kinds of small props (like toys, dishes, cups, showcases, candle stand etc.). The anchor asks participants to observe the position of the props very carefully. After that she asks the participants to go out of the room for some time. The anchor rearranges six props of the table and the participants have to identify those six changes. They can win up to ₹ 3000 from this round.

== Anchors ==
External videos
- Rojgere Ginni videos at official website
- Rojgere Ginni videos at ETV Bangla's official Youtube channel

In 10 years the show has been hosted by different anchors, like–

- Paroma Banerji
- Madhumanti Maitra
- Lajbonti Roy
- Rupali Rai Bhattacharya
- Kousani Roy Sarkar
- Kanyakumari Arkodeepto Mukherjee
- Lopamudra Sinha
- Koneenica Banerjee
- Anjana Basu
- Diotima Chowdhury

== See also ==
- Didi No. 1
- A Morning with Farah
