= Inquilaab (2002 film) =

- Theatrical release poster
- Directed by: Anup Sengupta
- Written by: N. K. Salil (dialogues)
- Screenplay by: N. K. Salil
- Story by: Krishna Daga
- Produced by: Abhishek Daga
- Starring: Prosenjit Chatterjee; Arpita Pal; Chiranjit Chakraborty; Abhishek Chatterjee
- Cinematography: V. Prabhakar; Yousuf Khan
- Edited by: Somnath Kar; Malay Laha
- Music by: S. Shubhayu
- Release date: 1 March 2002
- Country: India
- Language: Bengali

Inquilaab (transl. Revolution) is a 2002 Bengali action thriller film directed by Anup Sengupta. The film features actors Prosenjit Chatterjee and Arpita Pal in the lead roles. Music of the film has been composed by S. Shubhayu.

== Cast ==
- Prosenjit Chatterjee
- Arpita Pal
- Chiranjit Chakraborty as Abhinash Choudhary
- Abhishek Chatterjee
- Chinmoy Roy
- Debesh Roy Chowdhury as Murrarimohan Dutta
- Mrinal Mukherjee as Mahadeb Sanyal
- Anamika Saha as Leelabati
- Lokesh Ghosh
- Biplab Chatterjee
- Ramen Roy Chowdhury as Neelkanta Roy
