= Deep Fridge =

2025 Indian Bengali film by Arjunn Dutta

- Theatrical release poster
- Directed by: Arjunn Dutta
- Screenplay by: Arjunn Dutta; Ashirbad Maitra
- Story by: Arjunn Dutta
- Dialogues by: Arjunn Dutta; Ashirbad Maitra; Atmadeep Bhattacharya
- Produced by: Krishna Kyal
- Starring: Abir Chatterjee; Tanusree Chakraborty
- Cinematography: Supratim Bhol
- Edited by: Sujay Datta Ray
- Music by: Soumya Rit
- Production company: Colors of Dream Entertainment
- Distributed by: Colors of Dream Entertainment
- Release date: 21 November 2025
- Running time: 104 minutes
- Country: India
- Language: Bengali

Deep Fridge is a 2025 Indian Bengali emotional drama film directed by Arjunn Dutta. Produced by Krishna Kyal under the banner of Colors of Dream Entertainment. The film stars Abir Chatterjee and Tanusree Chakraborty in the lead roles. The film deals with the complexities of human emotions, fragile relationships and silence that lingers despite a new beginning in life.

Principal photography took just 10 days in March 2023. Supratim Bhol did the cinematography while Sujay Datta Ray handled the editing. The music and the lyrics have been done by Somuya Rit. The film won the Best Bengali Feature Film Award at the 71st National Film Awards. It was screened at the 54th International Film Festival of India. The film was released in the theatres on 21 November 2025.

== Synopsis ==
Deep Fridge is a single-night drama which unfolds on a stormy night at Mili's apartment. Mili is a divorced woman co-parenting her only child, Tatai, with her ex-husband, Swarnava. On one hand, Swarnava is trying to start a new life with his pregnant student turned second wife, Ronja. Abir was caught cheating with Ronja on his third marriage anniversary with Mili. This led Mili to divorce him. On the other hand, Mili seeks emotional refuge in Asif, a painter, after her divorce with Swarnava. On the stormy night, Swarnava is emotionally compelled to stay at Mili's apartment in order to take care of their severely fever-stricken son, Tatai. That night, they confronted their deep sunken emotions and introspected their failed marriage, metaphorically equated with the malfunctioning refrigerator at her apartment, which is frozen and is on the verge of breaking down. It is used to express their repressed feelings. Structured into three sections—Ice Cube, Melting Point, and Defrost—the film shows both of them accepting their present, realising they can leave their past and walk towards separate futures for the well-being of their child.

== Cast ==
- Abir Chatterjee as Swarnava
- Tanusree Chakraborty as Mili
- Anuradha Mukherjee as Ronja
- Shoaib Kabeer as Asif
- Lakshya Bhattacharya as Tatai
- Debjani Chatterjee
- Arya Dasgupta
- Priyanka Guha Roy
- Kaushik Chatterjee

== Production ==
=== Development and announcement ===
"There are so many couples who are unhappy in their marriages and many of them get divorced even after spending several years together. But in the process, can we forget our first love totally or is flame still flickering there somewhere. That’s the thought from where the story started brewing."

— Arjunn Dutta, speaking on how he got the idea of making this film

Deep Fridge was announced in March 2023. It marked the second collaboration between Abir Chatterjee and Tanusree Chakraborty after Flat No. 609 (2018). The principal supporting cast of Debjani Chatterjee, Anuradha Mukherjee, Shoaib Kabeer, and Lakshya Bhattacharya was announced along with it. The first poster of the film was released on 6 October 2025, coinciding with Lakshmi Puja.

=== Casting ===
The director approached Abir for the film in 2020. But Abir was initially reluctant about doing the film because of his date clashes and low interest in the storyline. But Dutta re-approached him after two months. Abir said in an interview that he signed the film to respect Arjunn's confidence about the fact that he came back and was serious about casting him in the project.

== Soundtrack ==
Deep Fridge

Soundtrack album by Soumya Rit
- Released: 2025
- Genre: Film soundtrack
- Length: 21:41
- Language: Bengali
- Label: Zee Music Bangla

The music and background score of the film has been composed by Soumya Rit. He has also penned the lyrics. The songs have been sung by Mekhla Dasgupta, Porshia Sen and Kajol Chatterjee.

The music launch event for the film was held on 2 November 2025. All the audio tracks were released on that day. The event also unveiled the first video song - "Jash Na Chole (Piano Version)". The second song "Garaj Gagan Barase" was released on 10 November 2025. The third song "Jhile Jhile Re" was released on 10 November 2025. The fourth song "Tadap Tadap" was released on 17 November 2025.

Track listing
No.	Title	Singer(s)	Length
1.	"Jash Na Chole - Piano Version"	Porshia Sen, Soumya Rit	4:31
2.	"Garaj Gagan Barase"	Mekhla Dasgupta, Soumya Rit	4:03
3.	"Jash Na Chole"	Porshia Sen, Soumya Rit	4:47
4.	"Jhile Jhile Re"	Mekhla Dasgupta, Soumya Rit	3:34
5.	"Tadap Tadap"	Kajol Chatterjee, Soumya Rit	4:46
Total length:			21:41

== Release ==
The film was scheduled to release in the theatres in the first half of 2024 but got postponed for over a year. The film was finally released in theatres on 21 November 2025.

== Reception ==
=== Critical reception ===
Arani Bhattacharya of Sangbad Pratidin reviewed the film and wrote "The story is of two lines but its impact is long lasting. Emotional dialogues, effective screenplay and editing, and a lyrical cinematography elevates this film." She applauded the effective use of "rain" throughout, the greyish characters, the Bengali-ness of the film, the performance of the lead cast - specially Abir, and the music but criticized the over-repetition of the scene in which coffee is being given to Tatai, and the lack of any surprise element, which makes the end predictable.

Agnivo Niyogi of The Telegraph reviewed the film and wrote "The film draws you in with its simplicity and holds you there because every moment feels lived-in." He praised the well written characters, the emotional difference represented between the two characters in each of the three sections of the film, the performances of Abir and Tanusree, their conveyance of emotions through their eyes without speaking every time, the blue-green visual tone used throughout the film, the dim lighting and the metaphorical usage of the fridge. He especially applauded the fact that the director didn't settle for a happy ending and mentioned that the film makes a mark at the end, as the characters "walk into separate futures, with just fewer knots in their mind."

Shashwat Sisodiya of High On Films rated the film 3.5/5 stars and highlighted "Deep Fridge is a grim, hopeful, and simultaneously arresting look at marital infidelity." He praised the simple writing of the film, the vibrant yet cold cinematography, the comforting music, Abir and Tanusree's performance as Swarnava and Mili respectively, the simple characters but bemoaned the writing of the other two man and woman.

Poorna Banerjee of The Times of India rated the film 3.5/5 stars and noted "Deep Fridge is more than a film — it’s a quiet excavation of the heart, an emotional drama that lingers long after the screen fades. Structured like a three-act tragedy, it’s a thoughtful piece that shows how silence can carry heavier truths than words." She praised the usage of the dying fridge as a metaphor for suppressed emotions, the cinematography with the blue-green colour palette used to display the inner coldness, Tanusree's apt display of her inner turmoil with restless restraint, Abir's controlled and silent emotional conveyance through his eyes and the music. She particularly applauded the film for its reluctance to give easy answers and maintain an ambiguity throughout.

Subhash K Jha of News24 rated the film 3/5 stars and wrote "Deep Fridge explores the fragile dynamics of marriage with emotional depth. Despite its flaws, the film leaves a lasting impression on the audience." He criticised the lack of backstory between Swarnava and Ronja, the dispatched mingling of past and present, unexplored characters in the supporting cast and Tanusree's below par performance but praised Abir's articulate acting skills.

Devesh Sharma of Filmfare rated the film 4/5 stars and wrote "Deep Fridge is one of those rare films that handles heartbreak not with spectacle but with a gentleness that feels earned. It examines what remains after a relationship dissolves, and what quietly grows in its aftermath - the ache of a love that didn’t survive but didn’t die either." He praised the poetical use of a malfunctioning refrigerator, the film's division into three segments which have been metaphorically aligned with the fridge, the realism maintained throughout, Swarnava's relationship with Ronja, Mili's relationship with Asif, Ronja's affectionate rapport with Tatai, the emotional dilemma "brilliantly" portrayed by Abir and Tanusree, the cinematography and the emotionally nuanced but sensitive ending.

== Accolades ==
=== Awards ===
Year	Award	Ceremony	Category	Recipient	Ref.
2025	National Film Awards	71st National Film Awards	National Film Award for Best Bengali Feature Film	Arjunn Dutta	
2025	Telangana Bengali Film Festival	Telangana Bengali Film Festival - Aayna 2025	Best Actor (Popular)	Abir Chatterjee	
2025	Telangana Bengali Film Festival	Telangana Bengali Film Festival - Aayna 2025	Best Actress (Popular)	Tanusree Chakraborty	
2025	Telangana Bengali Film Festival	Telangana Bengali Film Festival - Aayna 2025	Superstar of the Year	Abir Chatterjee	

=== Official selections ===
- Official Selection - 54th International Film Festival of India (Panorama Section)
- Official selection - Pune International Film Festival
- Official Selection - Bengaluru International Film Festival
- Official Selection - Habitat Film Festival
- Official Selection - Mysuru Dasara Film Festival
- Official Selection - Telangana Bengali Film Festival
- Official Selection - International Film Festival, Thrissur
- Official Selection - Ajanta-Ellora International Film Festival
- Official Selection - Third Eye Asian Film Festival
