= Mukti (TV series) =

Indian Bengali language historical Web series

- মুক্তি
- Genre: Historical period Drama
- Written by: Soumit Deb; Joydip Banerjee; Rohan Ghose
- Directed by: Rohan Ghose
- Starring: Ritwick Chakraborty; Arjun Chakrabarty; Ditipriya Roy
- Music by: Indradeep Dasgupta
- Country of origin: India
- Original language: Bengali
- No. of seasons: 1
- No. of episodes: 9

Production
- Cinematography: Indranath Marick
- Editor: Anirban Maity
- Running time: 45 minutes
- Production company: Fatfish Entertainment

Mukti is an Indian Bengali language historical period drama original web series streaming on OTT platform ZEE5. It is written and directed by Rohan Ghose. The series has been produced by Pritam Chowdhury under the production house Fatfish Entertainment. This nine-episode web series was released on 26 January 2022. It stars Ritwick Chakraborty, Arjun Chakrabarty and Ditipriya Roy in the lead roles.

== Plot ==
The story set in 1931, revolving around a conspiracy and a football match that pits the Indian revolutionaries against the British.

== Cast ==
- Ritwick Chakraborty as Ram Kinkar Ghosh
- Arjun Chakrabarty as Dibakar Bandhobadhyay
- Ditipriya Roy as Minu
- Sudip Sarkar as Rahamat Ali
- Chitrangada Satarupa as Prava
- Carl A Harte as Alfred Petty
- Chandreyee Ghosh
- Shaheb Chattopadhyay as Pritanjan Babu
- Biswarup Biswas as Kanto

== Episodes list ==
No. overall	No. in season	Title	Directed by	Written by	Original release date
1	1	"The Loyal Dog"	Rohan Ghose	Rohan Ghose	26 January 2022
In Midnapore Jail, where freedom fighters are tortured by jailor Petty, Ram Kinkar is promoted and entrusted with new responsibilities. The decision on the execution of a minor inmate is still pending.
2	2	"The Riot"	Rohan Ghose	Rohan Ghose	26 January 2022
While the two jailors, Bell and Petty, continue to have disagreements, the revolutionaries led by Prava hatch a plan to free Dibakar. Meanwhile, Satyen’s hanging also adds fuel to the fire.
3	3	"The Real Plan"	Rohan Ghose	Rohan Ghose	26 January 2022
Swadhin and his friends are arrested, and they enter the jail to help Dibakar escape from prison. Meanwhile, on Lord Cuthbert’s visit, a football match is organised in the jail.
4	4	"The Demon Within"	Rohan Ghose	Rohan Ghose	26 January 2022
Nanda tries to kill Dibakar but Surya saves him. When a guard is found murdered, Petty loses his cool and takes his torture of prisoners to another level.
5	5	"The Turning Point"	Rohan Ghose	Rohan Ghose	26 January 2022
When the army team’s participation looks doubtful, Ram Kinkar suggests that the prisoners be allowed to make a football team. Meanwhile, Prava tries to kill Petty when he visits Gulshanara’s house.
6	6	"The Change of Heart"	Rohan Ghose	Rohan Ghose	26 January 2022
Ram Kinkar calls the prisoners for team selection. The freedom fighters initially refuse to participate but later change their minds. Meanwhile, Prava tries to enter the jail where she meets Kanta.
7	7	"The Wolf-Pack"	Rohan Ghose	Rohan Ghose	26 January 2022
For the football match, Rehmat demands jerseys made up of local materials. Worried about the prisoners’ team performance, Petty tries to create obstacles to deter them.
8	8	"The Sacrifice"	Rohan Ghose	Rohan Ghose	26 January 2022
Nanda makes another attempt at killing Dibakar, but Surya saves him by sacrificing his life. Petty kills Nanda to hide the truth and attempts to rape Minu.
9	9	"The Fight of Freedom"	Rohan Ghose	Rohan Ghose	26 January 2022
It’s match-day, and under Rehmat’s leadership, the team makes a rousing comeback. At the end of the match, the freedom fighters break down the wall with a bomb and escape.

== Release ==
ZEE5 announced the launch of a trailer on 14 January 2021 and the series was released on 26 January 2022.

== Reception ==
=== Critical reviews ===
Shaheen Irani of Ottplay has given 3/5 stars stating that Ritwick Chakraborty's series would have been more impactful in movie format. Various elements of the series have stretched, and the story runs in circles between the stubborn rebels and the mean officers. The climax scene is slightly different from all the other sports dramas, which comes with emotions. However, that makes it a notch above the visuals.

Binged team has given 4.75/10 stars stating that it is well-intentioned drama but hampered by tedious length. The performance of Ritwick Chakraborty is as charming and winsome as Ramkinkar Babu. He delivers a polished and restrained performance in both his avatars. Arjun Chakraborty and Satyam Bhattacharya were equally impactful in their performances. The musical score is soothing to listen to, while the background score gets too loud boisterous at times, but overall it was good. Cinematography and editing were executed well by capturing the rural Bengal of the early twentieth century.

Suparna Majumdar of Sangbad Pratidin has given 2.5/5 stars stating that the web series tells the story of the fight for freedom of India's freedom struggle on the football field. The performances of lead roles were impressive. The cinematography of the series was good, and the story of the early Bengal can easily be seen at times from him.
