= Achena Uttam =

2022 Indian Bengali biographical film

- Theatrical release poster
- Directed by: Atanu Bose
- Based on: Uttam Kumar
- Starring: Saswata Chatterjee; Rituparna Sengupta; Srabanti Chatterjee; Ditipriya Roy; Tirtha Raj Bose
- Cinematography: Supriyo Dutta
- Edited by: Malay Laha
- Music by: Upali Chattopadhay
- Production companies: Alaknanda Arts; Shankh Entertainment
- Distributed by: Panorama Studios; SSR Cinemas
- Release date: 22 July 2022
- Country: India
- Language: Bengali

Achena Uttam is a 2022 Indian Bengali-language biographical movie, directed by Atanu Bose and produced by Alaknanda Arts. Music is by Upali Chattopadhyay. The story of this film is based on the life of Uttam Kumar – known and unknown.

== Cast ==
- Saswata Chatterjee as Uttam Kumar
  - Tirtha Raj Bose as young Uttam Kumar
- Rituparna Sengupta as Suchitra Sen
- Srabanti Chatterjee as Gouri Devi
- Ditipriya Roy as Sabitri Chatterjee
- Biswanath Basu as Tarun Kumar
- Priyanshu Chatterjee as Satyajit Ray
- Sayantani Raychaudhuri as Supriya Devi
- Sampurna Lahiri as Sumitra Mukherjee
- Ratashree Dutta as Sharmila Tagore
- Sneha Das as a young Gouri Devi
- Arindol Bagchi as Salil Dutta
- Anubhav Kanjilal as Goutam
- Anindya Sarkar as Shakti Samanta

== Production ==
=== Development ===
The production house Alaknanda Arts contacted director Atanu Bose in November 2019 while he was busy shooting in Mumbai. He was quite surprised to have been contacted, as he had no linkage with Uttam Kumar's family or the production house. Bose decided to cast Saswata Chatterjee in the lead role. The film was a heavily researched one, with Sibasish Bandhyopadhyay in charge of research and development. The muhurat of the film was held on 3 March 2021 at a hotel in central Kolkata.

=== Casting ===
Saswata Chatterjee, who previously played the role of Ritwik Ghatak in Meghe Dhaka Tara, also played a pivotal role in this film. He played the legend Uttam Kumar, which was "an extremely difficult task" to portray. He remarked that "no amount of preparation is enough to portray him." Rituparna Sengupta, cast as Suchitra Sen, the "forever heartthrob of every Bengali man", said that she had "goosebumps" playing the role. Ratashree Dutta, who played Sharmila Tagore, had her appearance and acting appreciated by Sharmila Tagore herself, who praised her look and said that she had got the "essence of Sharmila in her".

=== Filming ===
The outdoor shoots of the film's first phase started at Tungling, Darjeeling, and the indoor portions, including the hospital sequence and the set of Uttam Kumar's Bhabanipur house in south Kolkata, were shot subsequently. A total of 35 people in the unit, including the actors, wore masks and sanitised their hands on every alternate day. A major part of the shoot was shot in Kolkata and North Bengal.

== Soundtrack ==
Achena Uttam

Soundtrack album by Upali Chattopadhay
- Released: 22 July 2022
- Genre: Film soundtrack
- Length: 22:20
- Language: Bengali
- Label: Panorama Music

Official audio
- Achena Uttam - Full Album on YouTube

The film uses a song written by Uttam Kumar.

Track listing
No.	Title	Singer(s)	Length
1.	"Ami Jeneshune Bish Korechi Paan"	Shaheb Chattopadhyay	3:30
2.	"Tumi Sondhyaro Meghomala"	Durnibar Saha	3:41
3.	"Chhadmabeshi Gandhorbo"	Upali Chattopadhyay	3:17
4.	"Hindusthan Mein Keyaa Hain Tumhara"	Dipan Mitra, Upali Chattopadhyay	1:45
5.	"Jeneshune Bish Korechi Paan (Party Version)"	Shaheb Chattopadhyay	2:45
6.	"Noy Noy E Modhur Khela"	Bibhabendu Bhattacharya, Dipanwitaa Choudhury	2:35
7.	"Ki Paini Tar Hisab Milate"	Alok Roy Chowdhury	2:39
8.	"Achena Uttam (Party Music) (Instrumental)"	Alok Roy Chowdhury	2:08
Total length:			22:20

== Release ==
The trailer of Achena Uttam was released on 1 July 2022. The film was released in cinemas on 22 July 2022. The film was released in more than 100 cinemas in Kolkata and other states of India, with a worldwide release a week later. A special screening was also organised in Mumbai.

== Reception ==
Poorna Banerjee from Times of india rated the film 2.5 out of 5 and described it as "a cold, hard look into an actor's life and legacy". She wrote that Saswata Chatterjee embodies the Mahanayak so effectively that "the facial dissimilarities between the two is mostly forgotten", praising his speech, mannerisms and attention to detail. She also commended Ditipriya Roy's short but impactful role as Sabitri Chatterjee, the understated Biswanath Basu as Tarun Kumar, and called Priyanshu Chatterjee as Satyajit Ray "a surprisingly impressive fit".

However, Banerjee criticised the film's conflicting timelines, citing Uttam Kumar's discussions with Ray about rejecting Ghare Baire being placed immediately before a scene from the shooting of Nayak, and felt the narration needed "a good deal more definition and development". She did, however, praise the period detail ("the carpet, the cigarettes, or the cup") and called the music "sonorous", singling out "Ami Jene Shune Beesh Korechhi Paan", "Tumi Shondhar Meghomala" and the recreation of Uttam Kumar's own "Hindusthan Mein Keyaa Hain Tumhara". She concluded that the film, despite its cast, "still leaves one with a lack of emotional connect and a sense of disenchantment".

A reviewer for Sangbad Pratidin considered the film to be more of the "known" Uttam Kumar than the "unknown" until the facts mentioned lesser-known details, such as Uttam Kumar's own Hindi song being played in the 1946 Calcutta riots and his brother Tarun Kumar being part of Utpal Dutt's theatre. He called Saswata Chatterjee's act "truly extraordinary" as he brought Uttam Kumar to life, and added that other artistes played their characters in their own style and not like the originals. It mentioned that the factually inaccurate parts included the fact that Uttam Kumar was hospitalised for days when he actually came down with an illness during a party and died the next afternoon and a false hospital room was created in the script with Sabitri and Uttam discussing about their plans to marry. It felt that the film is worth watching for Chatterjee even with many other flaws in the screenplay.

== Controversy ==
Even before the release of Achena Uttam, the film got embroiled in a legal battle with another Bengali film, Ati Uttam, which was directed by Srijit Mukherji. In September 2021, Achena Uttam's producer, Alaknanda Arts, had issued a legal notice to Uttam Kumar's grandson Gourab Chatterjee, director Srijit Mukherji, and production house Camellia, alleging breach of contract. The notice claimed that the contract with Gourab Chatterjee prevented the use of Uttam Kumar's name and image in any film other than Achena Uttam, but both were used on the poster of Ati Uttam. Later, Uttam Kumar's granddaughter Nabamita Chatterjee clarified that while Ati Uttam used some clips of the actor's films, it was not a biopic, unlike Achena Uttam.

In February 2023, actress Haimanti Ganguly, wife of missing businessman Gopal Dalpati, was also omitted from Achena Uttam. Ganguly, who played a small part in the film as a nurse, was fired after she tried to get the film's producer to meet with another director without Atanu Bose's permission. Her departure was revealed during the probe into the recruitment scam. She was supposed to be filming for two days but was dismissed after a day, and her voice was dubbed.
