= Stoneman =

Unidentified Indian serial killer

Details
- Victims: 36–37
- Span of crimes: 1983–2011
- Country: India
- States: Maharashtra, West Bengal, Assam
- Imprisoned at: Never

The Stoneman is a name given by the popular English-language print media of Calcutta, India to an unidentified serial killer who murdered at least 13 sleeping homeless people in Calcutta in 1989. The name is also given to the perpetrator of a similar series of murders in Mumbai from 1983 to 1988. It has been speculated that these were the work of the same person, who could have been responsible for as many as 26 murders.

The Stoneman was blamed for thirteen murders over six months (the first in June 1983), but it was never established whether the crimes were committed by one person or a group of individuals. The Calcutta Police also failed to resolve whether any of the crimes were committed as a copycat murder. To date, no one has been charged with any of the crimes; all thirteen cases remain unsolved.

== Mumbai killings ==
The first hint of a serial killer who was targeting homeless ragpickers and beggars in India came from Mumbai. Starting in 1985 and lasting well over two years, a series of twelve murders were committed in the Sion and King's Circle locality of the city. The criminal or criminals' mode of operation was simple: first, they would find an unsuspecting victim sleeping alone in a desolate area. The victim's head was crushed with a single stone weighing as much as 30 kg. In most cases, the victims' identities could not be ascertained since they slept alone and did not have relatives or associates who could identify them. Compounded to this was that the victims were people of very simple means and the individual crimes were not high-profile. It was after the sixth murder that the Mumbai Police began to see a pattern in the crimes.

A homeless waiter survived one of the Stoneman's attacks and managed to escape to report it to the police. However, in the dimly lit area of Sion where he was sleeping, he had not been able to get a good look at his assailant.

Shortly afterwards, in 1987, a ragpicker was hacked to death in the adjoining suburb of Matunga. Even though the police and the media suspected the Stoneman killer, no evidence linking the incidents was ever found.

In the middle of 1988, the killings suddenly stopped. The case remains unsolved.

== Summer of 1989 in Calcutta ==
Whether or not the Mumbai killings were linked to the Calcutta "Stoneman" killings has never been confirmed. However, the similarity in the instrument, choice of victims, execution, and the time of the attacks suggests the assailant(s) was familiar with the Mumbai episodes, if not the same killer himself.

The first victim in Calcutta died from injuries to the head in June 1989. Twelve more murders attributed to the Stoneman were reported within the following six months. All of the murdered were homeless pavement-dwellers who slept alone in dimly lit areas of the city. Most of the murders took place in central Calcutta, adjoining the Howrah Bridge.

Because the murderer killed the victims by dropping a heavy stone or concrete slab, the police assumed that the assailant was probably a tall, well-built male. However, in the absence of any eyewitness description, no confirmed physical description ever became available.

Police were deployed into various parts of the city, and numerous arrests were made. After a spell of arrests in which a handful of "suspicious persons" were detained for questioning, the killings stopped. However, citing a lack of evidence, the suspects were released into the public. The crimes remain unsolved.

== Stoneman in Guwahati ==
Similar incidents were reported in Guwahati city of Assam state during February 2009.

== Film adaptations based upon the events ==
Producer Bobby Bedi produced a film titled The Stoneman Murders based on these incidents. The film was released on 13 February 2009, starring Kay Kay Menon and Arbaaz Khan, and written and directed by Manish Gupta. Gupta said that his story for the movie is 40% fact and 60% fiction. The movie depicts the killings as a part of a religious ritual being conducted by a policeman, with the actual perpetrator left open to interpretation at the end.

In 2011, a Bengali film named Baishe Srabon was released, directed by Srijit Mukherjee. The plot of the movie revolved around the same mysterious serial killings in Kolkata which took place during the period of 1989. In the movie, the murderer is shown to choose victims mostly from the poor and homeless sector of society: sex workers, drug users or street people. However, the film ends with the serial killer shooting himself after confessing to all his crimes: a clear deviation from the facts.

== See also ==
- The Stoneman Murders (TV series)
- Joshi-Abhyankar serial murders
- 2006 Noida serial murders
- Raman Raghav
- The bestselling true-crime book The Deadly Dozen: India's Most Notorious Serial Killers by Anirban Bhattacharyya
- Amir Qayyum
