= Colours of Innocence =

Sahaj Pather Gappo (Colours of Innocence)
- Colours of Innocence
- Directed by: Manas Mukul Pal
- Screenplay by: Manas Mukul Pal
- Based on: Taal Nabami by Bibhutibhushan Bandyopadhyay
- Produced by: Avijit Saha
- Starring: Nur Islam; Samiul Alam; Sneha Biswas; Shakuntala Barua
- Cinematography: Supratim Bhol; Mrinmoy Mondal
- Edited by: Sujoy Dutta Roy; Anirban Maity
- Release date: 2016
- Country: India
- Language: Bengali

Sahaj Paather Gappo (Bengali: সহজ পাঠের গপ্পো) (English: Colours of Innocence) is a Bengali film directed by Manas Mukul Pal and produced by Avijit Saha. The film is based on the short story by famous writer Bibhutibhushan Bandyopadhyay. The music was done by Chandradip Goswami and Indraadip Dasgupta.

== Plot ==
10-year-old Gopal's carefree childhood is disrupted when his father meets with an accident. It becomes difficult for his mother to feed him and his little brother Chottu. Gopal starts devising ways to earn money. With a little assistance from Chottu he takes up odd jobs from cleaning wells to selling laboriously plucked fruits in the local village market. Emboldened by his initial success, Gopal fancies himself as the breadwinner of the family. Meanwhile, a grand Janmashtami feast is being planned in the Brahmin household where the pulao will be served. Hearing this both the brothers hatch plans of their own. Gopal would like to make a quick buck by selling palmyras for the feast, while Chottu starts dreaming of this fancy dish that he has never seen or tasted. After all he has heard that the whole village will be invited. But as a disheartening reality Gopal and Chhotu were not chosen to be invited. It shattered Chhotu's dream world.

== Cast ==
- Shakuntala Barua as Lakshmi Granny
- Nur Islam as Chhotu
- Samiul Alam as Gopal
- Sanjay Biswas as Pecho
- Sneha Biswas as mother of Chhotu and Gopal

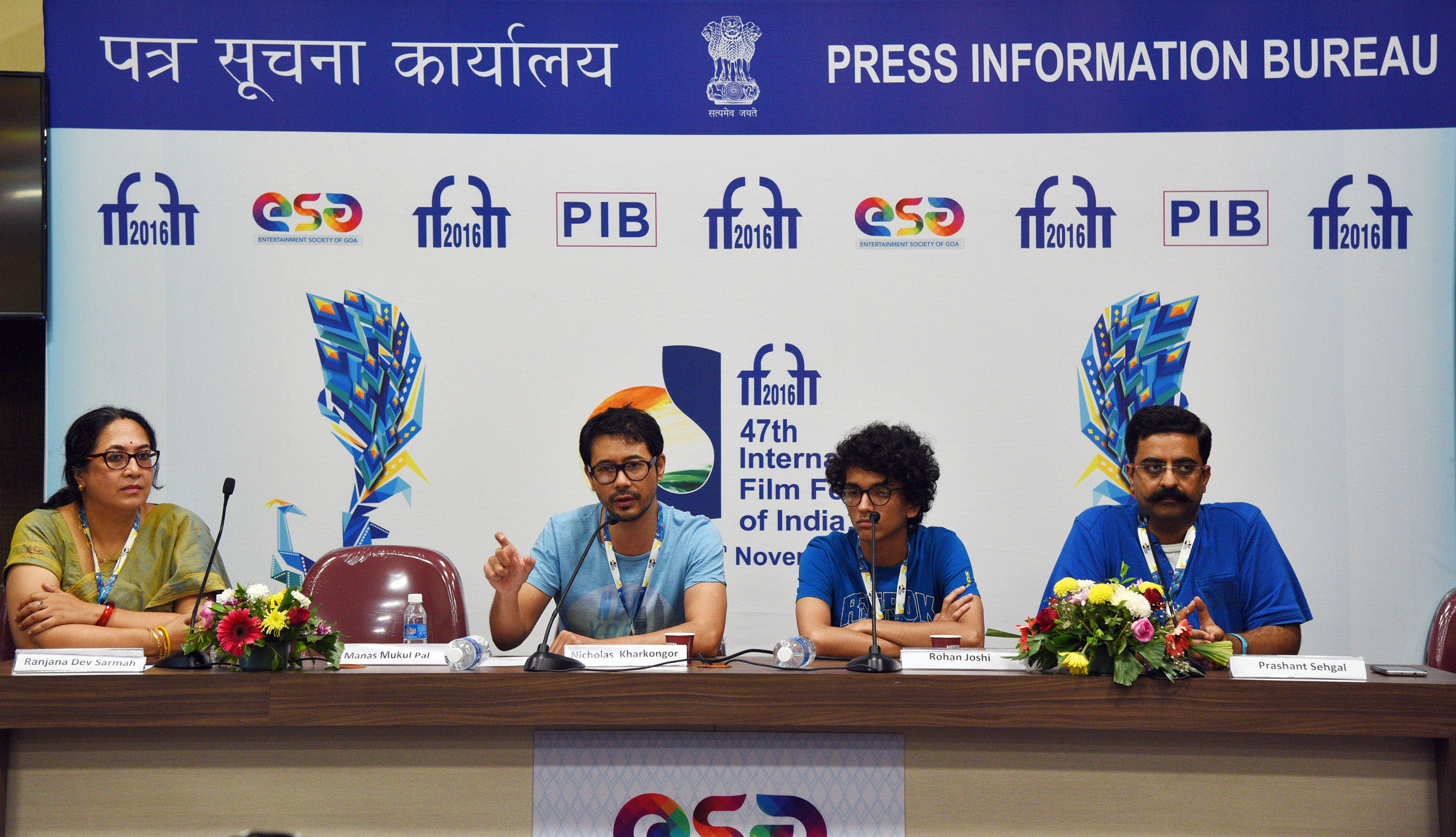
Film crew, IFFI (2016)

== Production ==
=== Development ===
This film is the debut film of Manas Mukul Pal as director and produced by Avijit Saha.

=== Filming ===
Shooting for the film started from August 2015. To capture the seasons of rural Bengal, the film was shot in three different seasons - post monsoon, Autumn and Spring. The locations for shooting were chosen as the interiors of Bengal villages near Bolpur in Birbhum district and Piyali in South 24 Parganas.

Manas started this film with fresh faces chosen by himself from the interiors of rural West Bengal. According to him, "I went to many schools in the villages of North and South 24 Pargana districts to find the suitable faces for the film. I did not want to use any of the polished urban child as the main protagonists of this film. Noor and Aminul were found in such village schools and I groomed them keeping in my own house for months." Almost everybody related to this film were on their first assignment for the big screen. So, an honest, passionate and dedicated work was possible and that became the key of success.

== Awards and recognition ==
This film made its entry to Mumbai Film Festival 2016 in two categories and is selected for Indian Panorama section of International Film Festival of India 2016. It is also one of the two movies from India that competed in the international section of International Film Festival of India. Noor Islam and Samiul Alam jointly won the National Film Awards, India (2016) in the best child actor category

Here is the list of all the recognition -

- First Bengali film in last three decades to win National Film Awards in Best Child Actor Category (2016)
- One of the 26 feature films selected for Indian Panorama Section of the 47th International Film Festival of India (2016)
- One of the 2 Indian films selected for the international competition section of 47th International Film Festival of India (2016)
- Special Jury Mention award in Mumbai International Film Festival (2016)
- Invited in Goteborg International Film Festival, Sweden (2017)
- Invited in New York Indian Film Festival (2017) – nominated for Best Film and Best Director award.
- Invited in Asia Pacific Screen Awards (2017)
- The International Critics Prize (FIPRESCI Prize) in Schlingel International Children's Film Festival (2017)
- Invited in Kolkata International Children's Film Festival (2018).
- Won four Filmfare Awards East, 2018 for Best Debut Director, Best Screenplay, Best Editing, Best Debut Actor.
- Won Best director award given by West Bengal Government in 2017
- It won Most Promising Director, Best Sound Design, Most Promising Actor honour at the second West Bengal Film Journalist Association award function for films released in 2017.
