= Deva (2002 film) =

- Theatrical release poster
- Deva
- Directed by: Sujit Guha
- Screenplay by: Monotosh Chakraborty; Sujit Guha
- Story by: Sujit Guha
- Produced by: Nispal Singh; Goutam Kundu
- Starring: Prosenjit Chatterjee; Victor Banerjee; Arpita Pal; Kharaj Mukherjee
- Cinematography: V. Prabhakar
- Edited by: Swapan Guha
- Music by: Bappi Lahiri
- Production companies: Surinder Films; Silver Vally Communications Pvt Ltd.
- Distributed by: Surinder Films; Silver Vally Communications Pvt Ltd.
- Release date: 6 December 2002
- Running time: 162 minutes
- Country: India
- Language: Bengali

Deva is a 2002 Indian Bengali-language action film co-written and directed by Sujit Guha. Produced by Nispal Singh and Goutam Kundu under the banners of Surinder Films and Silver Vally Communications Pvt Ltd respectively, the screenplay and dialogues of the film were written by Monotosh Chakraborty. It stars Prosenjit Chatterjee and Arpita Pal in the lead roles. Music of the film has been composed by Bappi Lahiri. The film was a remake of Tamil film Dheena (2001).

== Synopsis ==
Deva works for his brother, a gangster, and is very close to him. However, things turn sour between them after a misunderstanding leads to the death of their sister.

== Cast ==
- Prosenjit Chatterjee as Dibakar Chowdhury aka Deva
- Arpita Pal as Neela, Deva's love interest
- Victor Banerjee as Prabhakar Chowdhury, Deva's elder brother and Don of Kolkata
- Laboni Sarkar as Gauri Chowdhury, Deva's sister-in-law
- Kharaj Mukherjee as Deva's friend
- Arun Banerjee as MLA Madhu Dutta
- Kushal Chakraborty as Ashok, Neela's elder brother
- Sucheta Chakraborty as Seema, Deva's sister

== Soundtrack ==
Track listing
No.	Title	Singer(s)	Length
1.	"Ki Kore Je Prem Hoe"	Kumar Sanu, Sadhana Sargam	5:21
2.	"Tumi Je Monalisa"	Shaan, Sunidhi Chauhan	4:59
3.	"Beauty Queen"	Kumar Sanu	5:30
4.	"Bhabini Kakhono Je Ami"	Kumar Sanu, Sadhana Sargam	4:27
5.	"Ei Subhodin"	Bappi Lahiri, Priya Bhattacharya	4:56
6.	"Preme Ki Jala Re"	Shaan, Rema Lahiri	5:18
