= Shrimati (film) =

2022 Indian Bengali film

- Theatrical release poster
- Directed by: Arjunn Dutta
- Written by: Arjunn Dutta
- Produced by: Kan Singh Sodha
- Starring: Swastika Mukherjee; Soham Chakraborty
- Cinematography: Supratim Bhol
- Edited by: Sujay Datta Ray
- Music by: Soumya Rit
- Production company: KSS Productions
- Distributed by: Shree Venkatesh Films
- Release date: 8 July 2022
- Country: India
- Language: Bengali

Shrimati is a 2022 Indian Bengali language comedy drama film written and directed by Arjunn Dutta. The film is produced by Kan Singh Sodha under the banner of KSS Productions. The film features Swastika Mukherjee and Soham Chakraborty in lead roles.

== Cast ==
- Swastika Mukherjee
- Soham Chakraborty
- Trina Saha
- Kheya Chattopadhyay
- Uday Pratap Singh
- Barkha Sengupta
- Debjani Bose

== Release ==
The trailer of the film released on 8 June 2022. The film was released theatrically on 8 July 2022.

== Soundtrack ==
Shrimati

Soundtrack album by Soumya Rit
- Released: 2022
- Genre: Film soundtrack
- Length: 12:41
- Language: Bengali
- Label: Times Music Bangla

Track listing
No.	Title	Singer(s)	Length
1.	"Shon Shon"	Somlata Acharyya Chowdhury	4:45
2.	"Boka Boka Ei Mon"	Anupam Roy	4:17
3.	"36-24-36"	Lagnajita Chakraborty	3:39
Total length:			12:41
