= Abyakto =

2018 Indian Bengali film

- Official poster
- Directed by: Arjunn Dutta
- Written by: Arjunn Dutta
- Produced by: Tarun Das
- Starring: Arpita Chatterjee; Adil Hussain; Anubhav Kanjilal; Anirban Ghosh; Lily Chakravarty; Kheya Chattopadhyay
- Cinematography: Supratim Bhol
- Edited by: Sujay Datta Ray
- Music by: Soumyarit Nag
- Production companies: Trina Films; Roop Production & Entertainment
- Release dates: November 2018 (Kolkata); January 31, 2020
- Country: India
- Language: Bengali

Abyakto (transl. Unsaid) is a 2020 Indian Bengali-language drama film directed by Arjunn Dutta, starring Arpita Chatterjee, Adil Hussain, Anubhav Kanjilal, Anirban Ghosh, Lily Chakravarty and Kheya Chattopadhyay. While the film was showcased in various festivals from 2018, the theatrical release was on 31 January 2020. Abyakto received critical acclaim.

== Plot ==
Abyakto is a poignant tale of a mother and son. The story encapsulates the unusual journey of Indra from his childhood and adolescence to adulthood. A series of unexplained events turn him into a man he never ought to be.

== Cast ==
- Arpita Chatterjee as Saathi, the mother
- Adil Hussain as Rudra, a friend of Saathi
- Anubhav Kanjilal as Indra, the son
- Anirban Ghosh as Koushik, the father
- Lily Chakravarty
- Kheya Chattopadhyay

== Release ==
Abyakto was screened at The Kolkata International Film Festival in 2018. It was selected in the Indian Panorama section of 49th International Film Festival of India (IFFI). It was also selected to compete in the category of Centenary Award for the best debut feature film of a director at the same festival.

== Reception ==
Abyakto received positive reviews in festival circuits. Reviewers praised the simplicity of the story telling, cinematography, background score, and acting. Bahskar Chattopadyay, reviewing for the Firstpost, particularly noted the restrained simple script and the "terrific performance" of Arpita Chatterjee. Suparna Thombare of Cinestaan praised director Dutta's "sensitive and creative story-telling ".

Upon its commercial release, the film received widespread appreciation from reviewers in print and electronic media.
