= Manas Mukul Pal =

Indian film director

- Born: 25 August 1987 (age 38)
- Occupations: Film director, actor, lyricist, writer, sound designer
- Years active: 2016 - Present
- Known for: Film making
- Notable work: Sahaj Paather Gappo Colours of Innocence
- Parent: Sri Manoranjan Pal Smt Chhanda Pal
- Awards: National Award Filmfare Awards (East) WBFJA Awards Bengal State Government Award ( বর্ষসেরা চলচ্চিত্র সম্মান)

Manas Mukul Pal (born 25 August 1987) is an Indian film director, actor, and screenwriter who predominantly works in Bengali cinema. He came to the limelight after directing his first feature film Colours of Innocence (2016) which was a critical and commercial success. He is working on his second feature film which is going to be a biopic of the freedom fighter Dinesh Gupta.

== Early life ==
Manas completed his schooling from Barasat Peary Charan Sarkar Government High School in 2005 and studied BSc from Barasat Government College.

== Career ==
His debut film as director is Sahaj Paather Gappo(Colours of Innocence) which was released in 2017 in India. This film got warm critical reception and fetched his success. This is the only Bengali film in the last three decades to win a National Award in the Best Child Actor Category (2016). For this film he bagged two Filmfare Awards (east) 2018 in Best Debut Director and Best Screenplay categories. He was given the Best Promising Director and Best Sound Designer honour for 'Sahaj Pather Goapo', at the second West Bengal Film Journalist Association award function for films released in 2017.He also received the Best Director award(2018) by Bengal State Government for this film.

== Filmography ==
=== As director ===
Year	Film	Director	Writer	ScreenPlay
2016	Sahaj Paather Gappo	Yes	No	Yes
TBA	Biopic of Dinesh Ch. Gupta	Yes	Yes	Yes
2026	ChandiKatha	Yes	Yes ( Co author)	Yes
