= The Stoneman Murders (TV series) =

Indian Bengali-language web series

- Genre: Thriller
- Directed by: Ejaz Saiyed, Rafik
- Country of origin: India
- Original languages: Bengali; Hindi
- No. of seasons: 1
- No. of episodes: 9

Production
- Producers: Raaj Rahhi; Zarna Mistry
- Production companies: Green Apple LLP; World Cinema Partners

Original release
- Release: 13 September 2019

The Stoneman Murders is an Indian Bengali language web series streaming on hoichoi. The story is basically inspired by true events, a serial killer who killed several people in the year of 1985 to 1989 in Mumbai and Calcutta and remained unidentified. The murderer is known as the Stoneman as he uses a stone to kill people. Rajatabha Dutta, Rupankar Bagchi and Swastika Mukherjee are the lead actors in the series. The Story starts with a train journey of journalist Sneha who finds the Stoneman's diary. This diary makes her curious to find out all the details about the Stoneman.

== Cast ==
- Rajatava Dutta
- Swastika Mukherjee as Sneha
- Rupankar Bagchi
- Pallab Kumar Das

== Episodes ==
Series	Episodes	Originally released
1	9	20 September 2019

== Season 1 (2019) ==
Season 1 of The Stoneman Murders was released on 13 September 2019 with 4 episodes, streaming on Bengali OTT platform Hoichoi. Season finale premiered on 20 September on hoichoi platform.

== Episodes ==
No.	Title	Directed by	Original release date
1	"Saint and Sins"	Ejaz Saiyed, Rafik	13 September 2019
2	"Camouflage"	Ejaz Saiyed, Rafik	13 September 2019
3	"Before the Murder"	Ejaz Saiyed, Rafik	13 September 2019
4	"Face to Face"	Ejaz Saiyed, Rafik	13 September 2019
5	"Do It Now"	Ejaz Saiyed, Rafik	20 September 2019
6	"Friend in Disguise"	Ejaz Saiyed, Rafik	20 September 2019
7	"Hide and Seek"	Ejaz Saiyed, Rafik	20 September 2019
8	"Revenge"	Ejaz Saiyed, Rafik	20 September 2019
9	"In Search of a Mystery"	Ejaz Saiyed, Rafik	20 September 2019
