= Chorabali (2016 film) =

Chorabali..the game of hunting
- Theatrical release poster
- Directed by: Subhrajit Mitra
- Produced by: Pradip Churiwal
- Starring: Barun Chanda; June Malia; Shataf Figar; Sayani Datta; Malobika Banerjee; Locket Chatterjee
- Cinematography: Supratim Bhol
- Music by: Dibyendu Mukherjee
- Production company: Macneill Engineering
- Release date: 22 January 2016
- Running time: 104 minutes
- Country: India
- Language: Bengali

Chorabali (English: Quicksand) is a 2016 Bengali Suspense Thriller film directed by Subhrajit Mitra and produced by Pradip Churiwal, starring Barun Chanda, June Malia, Sayani Datta and Shataf Figar. The film is based on Agatha Christie's novel Cards on the Table.

== Plot ==
The storyline intertangles with the idea of perfect crime, as well as with the basic vices of human mind - greed and lust. It is a whodunnit thriller, set in the backdrop of Kolkata. A doctor is killed in a house party while all the guests are playing cards. Criminologist Professor Ardhendu and Police officer Vishnu investigate the case along with crime-fiction writer Tilottama. It is revealed that the victim knew about the dark past of each one of the suspects and was blackmailing them. He himself also had a dark past. Two more murders take place. Now it is up to Professor Ardhendu to unmask the real culprit.

== Cast ==
- Barun Chanda as Ardhendu Chatterjee
- June Malia as Debolina
- George Baker as Dr. Dasgupta
- Tanusree Chakraborty as Tilottama
- Shataf Figar as Vishnu
- Locket Chatterjee as Madhurima Sen
- Sayani Datta
- Malobika Banerjee as Elina
- Dipanjan Basak
- Tathagata Banerjee
- Mou Baidya

== Release ==
Chorabali was released on 22 January 2016 in West Bengal under the banner of Macneill Engineering.
