= Swastika Mukherjee =

Indian actress (born 1980)

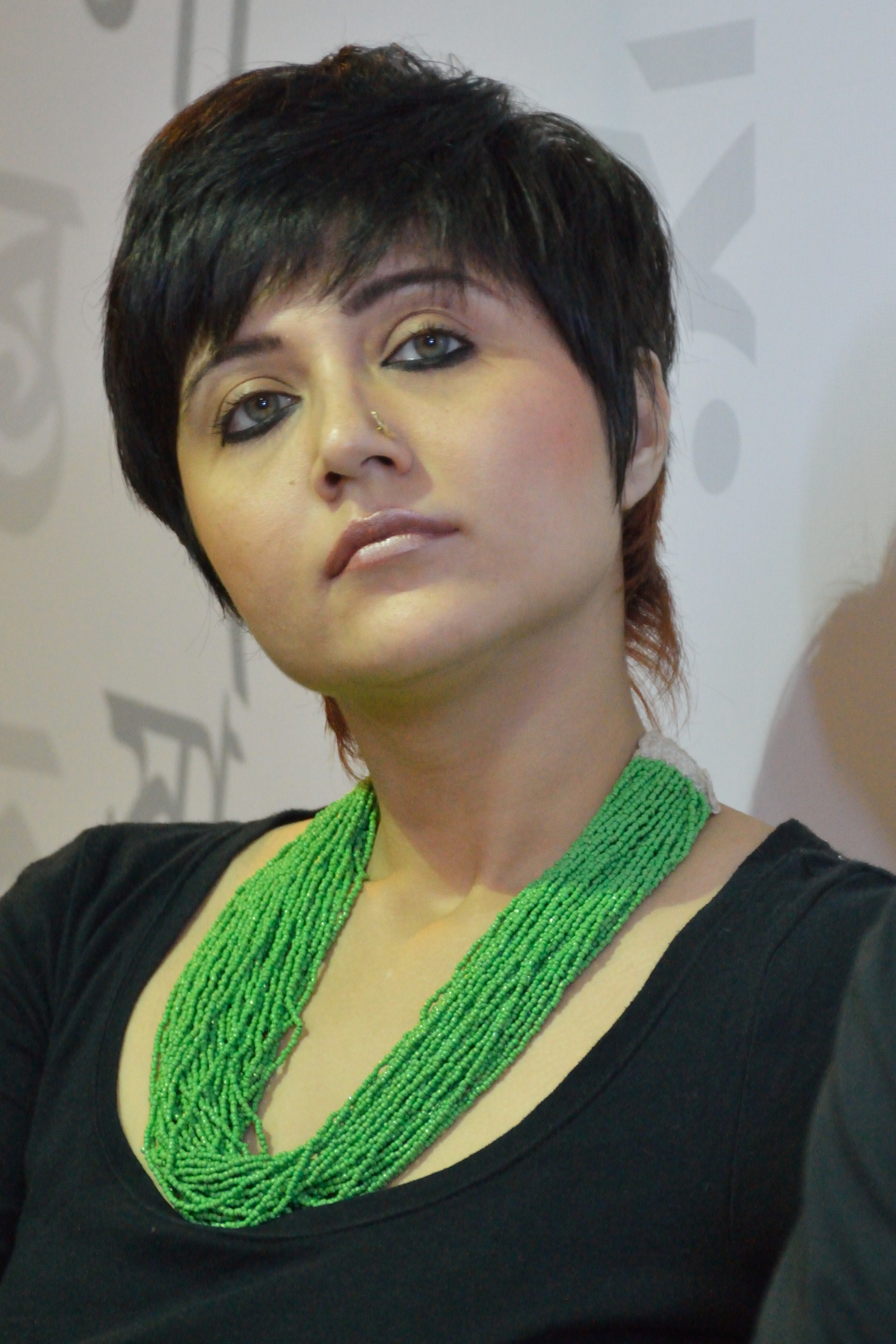
- Mukherjee in 2015
- Born: 13 December 1980 (age 45); Calcutta, West Bengal, India
- Occupation: Actress
- Years active: 2000–present
- Spouse: Promit Sen (m. 1998)
- Children: 1
- Father: Santu Mukhopadhyay
- Awards

Swastika Mukherjee (born 13 December 1980) is an Indian actress who mainly appears in Bengali and Hindi films and television. She is the daughter of actor Santu Mukhopadhyay. Throughout her career, she received various accolades including four Filmfare Awards East (including a record of three wins and five nominations for Best Actress), one WBFJA, one Anandalok Award and one Kalakar Award.

Mukherjee made her screen debut with Devdasi, a Bengali TV series. She made her big screen debut with Hemanter Pakhi (2001). Her first leading role came with Mastan (2004), opposite Jeet. She made her Hindi film debut with Mumbai Cutting (2008).

== Early life ==
Mukherjee spent her childhood in a self-described "simple life" with her father Santu Mukhopadhyay, younger sister Ajopa, and mother Gopa. Her favourite films were Mary Poppins, The Sound of Music, and Chitty Chitty Bang Bang. She was educated at Carmel School, Kolkata, St. Teresa's Secondary School, and Gokhale Memorial School. Post-Graduation in History at Jadavpur University.

== Personal life ==
In 1998 at the age of 18, she married Promit Sen, son of Rabindra Sangeet singer Sagar Sen. The marriage was an unhappy one and lasted two years. Swastika accused Promit of physically abusing her and locking her out of their home when she was pregnant. She filed a charge against him for cruelty and solicitation of dowry. These charges were subsequently dismissed and Promit was acquitted.

Swastika later filed an affidavit in court stating that her accusations were 'unfounded, false, baseless and speculative,' before confessing in a media conference that they were false. Consequently, Promit's brother sued her for damages in Calcutta High Court and she was held liable for ₹7.7 crore ($1.7 million). According to Mukherjee, Sen filed for divorce in 2000, but changed his mind when she became successful in her acting career. She has one daughter from the marriage, Anwesha, born in 2000.

In 2001, Mukherjee enrolled at the Ananda Shankar Centre for Culture, learning dance from veteran Tanusree Shankar. During the filming of Mastan, she began dating her co-star Jeet. They went on to appear in several films together, including Kranti, Sathihara, Priyotoma, Krishnakanter Will, Pitribhumi and Partner. She later began a relationship with Parambrata Chatterjee on the set of Brake Fail. As she was still lawfully married to Promit Sen, he filed a charge against Chatterjee for criminal adultery and enticement of a married woman. They separated in 2010 when Chatterjee moved to Bristol.

== Criminal case ==
In May 2026, an FIR was registered against Mukherjee and actor Parambrata Chatterjee at Gariahat police station in Kolkata about their social media posts on May 2, 2021, immediately after AITC's victory in the then Assembly elections instigated political violence against BJP workers in the state. The FIR registered by an advocate claims that at around 4 pm on May 4, Parambrata Chatterjee made a post in Bengali, which meant, “Let today be declared World ‘Rogorani’ thrashing Day!”), to which Mukherjee responded with an emoji, saying “Hahahah Hok Hok”, which instigated AITC workers for violence.

Mukerjee has already appeared before the police and her statement was recorded by the Investigating Officer, while Parambrata Chatterjee has moved to Calcutta High Court with an appeal to quash the FIR registered against him.

== Filmography ==
Year	Films	Role
2001	Hemanter Pakhi	
2003	Chokher Bali	Young Courtesan
2004	Mastan	Mamta
2005	Criminal	Nandita
2005	Tobu Valobashi	Anu
2005	Mantra	
2005	Sathihara	Anuradha
2006	Nayak	Nandini
2006	Priyotoma	Uttara
2006	Kranti	Arpita
2007	Kalishankar	Jhimli
2007	Sangharsha	Nandini
2007	Krishnakanter Will	Rohini
2007	Jibon Sathi	
2007	Pitribhumi	
2007	Bondhu	Aditi
2007	Greptar	Trisha
2008	Partner	Priya Bhattacharya
2008	Shibaji	Durga
2008	Hello Kolkata	Raima
2008	90 Ghanta	
2009	Sobar Upore Tumi	Bangladeshi film
2009	Brake Fail	-
2009	Janala	Meera
2009	033	Mrinali NRI
2010	Byomkesh Bakshi	Shiuli
2011	Mumbai Cutting	
2011	Nandini	
2011	Bye Bye Bangkok	Tanima
2012	Bhooter Bhabishyat	Kadalibala
2012	Abar Byomkesh	Rajani
2012	Tabe Tai Hok	Tilottama
2012	8:08 Er Bongaon Local	Shreyashi
2013	Mishawr Rawhoshyo	Snigdha
2013	Ami Aar Amar Girlfriends	Shree
2013	Basanta Utsav	
2013	Maach Mishti & More	Reena
2013	Aborto	
2014	Take One	Doyel Mitra-
2014	Jaatishwar	Mahamaya Bandopadhyay/ Soudamini
2015	Detective Byomkesh Bakshy!	Anguri Devi / Yasmeen
2015	Ebar Shabor	Mitali
2015	Shesher Kobita	Ketaki
2016	Saheb Bibi Golaam	Jaya
2016	Kiriti Roy	
2017	Byomkesh O Agnibaan	Malati
2017	Ashampta	-
2018	Aami Ashbo Phirey	Gargi
2018	Michael	Shinjini Sen
2018	Aaron	Alita Apte
2019	Kia and Cosmos	Dia Chaterjee
2019	Shah Jahan Regency	Kamalini Guha
2019	The Lovely Mrs. Mukherjee	
2020	Tasher Ghawr	Sujata
2020	Dil Bechara	Mrs. Sunila Basu
2020	Guldasta	Dolly Bagri
2020	Karmachakra: Episode Zero	Ganga (voice)
2022	Shrimati	
2022	Kora Kagazz	
2022	Qala	Urmila Manjushree Hindi film
2023	Shibpur	Mandira Biswas
2023	Love All	Hindi film
2024	Bijoyar Pore	Mrinmoyee
2024	Tekka	Ira Sengupta
2024	Love Sex Aur Dhokha 2	Lovina Singh
2025	Durgapur Junction	Ushashie
2026	Bibi Payra	Shiuli
2026	Gandhari	

== Television and web series ==
Year	Title	Role	Network	Notes
2000–2005	Ek Akasher Niche	Piu	Zee Bangla	
2001—2004	Pratibimbo	Uttara	Zee Bangla	
2006/2009/2011	Mahishasurmardini	Devi Mahamaya, Devi Yognidra, Devi Mahishasurmardini, Devi Koushiki, Devi Chandika	ETV Bangla	
2017	Dupur Thakurpo	Uma	Hoichoi	
2019	The Stoneman Murders	Sneha	Hoichoi	
2020	Charitraheen 3	Rabeya Shamin	Hoichoi	
2020	Black Widows	Jayati Sardesai	Zee5	
2020	Paatal Lok	Dolly Mehra	Amazon Prime Video	
2020	Paanch Phoron	Nayana	Hoichoi	
2021	Mohomaya	Aruna	Hoichoi	
2022	Escaype Live	Mala	Disney+ Hotstar	
2022	Criminal Justice: Adhura Sach	Avantika	Disney+ Hotstar	
2023	Nikhoj	Brinda Basu	Hoichoi	
2024	Bijoya	Bijoya	Hoichoi	
2025	Nikhoj 2	Brinda Basu	Hoichoi	
2026	Kaalipotka	Srima	ZEE5	
2026	Didi No. 1 Season 10	Host	Zee Bangla	

== Awards ==
Year	Award Name	Category	Movie
2012	Anandalok Award	Best Actress	Bhooter Bhabishyat
2017	Filmfare Awards East	Best Actress	Shaheb Bibi Golaam
2021	Filmfare Awards East	Best Actress	Shah Jahan Regency
2023	Filmfare Awards East	Best Actress	Shrimati
2024	Filmfare Awards East	Best Actress (Critics)	Shibpur
2024	West Bengal Film Journalists Association	Best Actress	Shibpur
2025	Joy Filmfare Glamour and Style Awards Bengal	Woman of Style and Substance	

== Controversies ==
In May 2014, Mukherjee was hospitalised after an alleged suicide attempt. Under strong local protest, Kolkata police detained Mukherjee's boyfriend Suman Mukhopadhyay.
