= Didi No. 1 =

Television series

- Poster showing former host, Rachna Banerjee
- Genre: Game Show
- Directed by: Avijit Sen
- Presented by: Puspita Mukherjee; Rachana Banerjee; June Malia; Debashree Roy; Swastika Mukherjee
- Starring: Females from every sphere
- Country of origin: India
- Original language: Bengali
- No. of seasons: 10
- No. of episodes: 3856

Production
- Producer: Zee Bangla
- Production location: Kolkata
- Running time: 45 minutes
- Production company: Zee Bangla Productions

Original release
- Network: Zee Bangla
- Release: 2010 – present

Related
- Sab Khelo Sab Jeeto; Rojgere Ginni

Didi No. 1 (transl. Sister No. 1) is a Bengali television game show for women launched in 2010. The show airs on Zee Bangla and airs a special dhamaka episode on every sundays. It is the second longest-running Bengali television series by episode count. On 3 March 2024, chief minister Mamata Banerjee was invited in the program which eventually made it more popular.

== Background of the program ==
There are total four rounds in Didi No. 1. Participants can get many gifts answering the questions asked by the anchor. At the end of each episode, the anchor gives crests and free gifts to the participants for their participation. The winner gets a different type of crest than the other participants. She also gets a badge tied upon her saree by the anchor. Season 9 was launched in a completely new avatar. First round contestants will play against each other in two pairs where host will ask questions and who will be able to answer that will collect all necessary grocery items within 10 seconds. In 2nd round the name change to Gaane Gaane Lokkhi Labh where contestant if answers right then will get the chance to collect a pouch which contains money.

== Seasons ==
| Year | Season | Anchor | Note | Ref. |
|---|---|---|---|---|
| 2010 | 1 | Puspita Mukherjee | | |
| 2011 | 2 | Rachna Banerjee | | |
| 2011 | 3 | June Malia | | |
| 2012 | 4 | Rachna Banerjee | | |
| 2013 | 5 | Debashree Roy | | |
| 2014 | 6 | Rachna Banerjee | | |
| 2016 | 7 | Rachna Banerjee | | |
| 2018 | 8 | Rachna Banerjee | Sudipa Chatterjee and Sourav Das hosted the show for a week | |
| 2022 | 9 | Rachna Banerjee | Mir Afsar Ali, Biswanath Basu, Sweta Bhattacharya and Rubel Das hosted few episodes in Rachna's absence | |
| 2026 | 10 | Swastika Mukherjee | | |

== See also ==
- Rojgere Ginni, Bengali television show
