= Guldasta (2020 film) =

2020 Indian Bengali film

- Theatrical release poster
- Directed by: Arjunn Dutta
- Written by: Arjunn Dutta
- Produced by: Ankit Das; Suresh Tolani
- Starring: Arpita Chatterjee; Swastika Mukherjee; Debjani Chattopadhyay
- Cinematography: Supratim Bhol
- Edited by: Sujay Datta Ray
- Music by: Soumya Rit
- Production companies: Roop Production and Entertainment
- Distributed by: Black Chillies Entertainment
- Release date: 21 October 2020
- Running time: 114 minutes
- Country: India
- Language: Bengali

Guldasta is a 2020 Indian Bengali-language drama film directed by Arjunn Dutta, starring Arpita Chatterjee, Swastika Mukherjee, Debjani Chattopadhyay and Anubhav Kanjilal. The film was released on 21 October 2020, in theaters coinciding with Puja holiday.

== Plot ==
Guldasta is a women-centric film, and interweaves tales of three lead female characters: Srirupa, Renu and Dolly. The backbone of the story stands strong with the realities of life faced by these three women who have a unique world of make-believe emotions of their own.

== Cast ==
- Arpita Chatterjee as Srirupa Sengupta
- Swastika Mukherjee as Dolly Bagri
- Debjani Chattopadhyay as Renu
- Anubhav Kanjilal as Tukai, Renu's Son
- Anuradha Mukherjee as Riya
- Ishaan Mazumder as Arnab Sengupta, Srirupa's Husband
- Chhanda Karanji Chattopadhyay as Renu's Mother In Law
- Mayukh Ray as Rohit
- Abhijit Guha – Special appearance as Renu's Husband

== Soundtrack ==
Guldasta

Soundtrack album by Soumya Rit
- Recorded: 2019
- Genre: Feature film soundtrack
- Language: Bengali
- Labels: Roop Production and Entertainment
External audio
- Audio song on YouTube

The soundtrack and lyrics of the film are composed by Soumya Rit.

Track listing
No.	Title	Singer(s)	Length
1.	"Rang Rasiya"	Shaoni	3:32
2.	"Chhaya Path Soriye"	Mayuri	2:31

== Reception ==
Guldasta received mediocre ratings from critics. Shantanu Ray Chaudhury, reviewing Guldasta, noted that despite its shortcomings, the film manages to appeal to the audience's emotion because of the director's "feel for the minutiae of life".
