= Arjunn Dutta =

Indian director and screenwriter

- Born: Kolkata
- Education: Presidency College, Kolkata
- Occupations: Film Director; Screenwriter

Arjunn Dutta is an Indian film director and screenwriter who predominantly works in Bengali cinema. His first feature film Abyakto (2018) was a critical success and earned laurels in film festivals. His film Deep Fridge won the National Film Award for Best Bengali Feature Film at the 71st National Film Awards ceremony (awarding films of 2023), announced in August 2025.

== Early life and education ==
Dutta was born in Kolkata in West Bengal. He completed his majors in Sociology and his Masters from the Presidency College, Kolkata.

== Career ==
Dutta made a short The 6th Element in 2016, which received positive critical reviews. His first feature film Abyakto (2018) was a critical success and earned laurels in film festivals. His second feature film Guldasta was released on 21 October 2020, to lukewarm reviews. In 2022, his next directorial Shrimati was released. In 2024, he won the National Film Award for Best Bengali Feature Film and multiple accolades for Deep Fridge. With Bibi Payra in 2026, he directed his first dark comedy film.

== Filmography ==
Year	Film	Director	Writer	Ref.
2018	Abyakto	Yes	Yes	
2020	Guldasta	Yes	Yes	
2022	Shrimati	Yes	Yes	
2024	Deep Fridge	Yes	Yes	
2026	Bibi Payra	Yes	Yes	
