= Subhrajit Mitra =

Indian actor, director and screenwriter

- Born: 18 January 1976 (age 50); Kolkata
- Occupations: Director; Screenwriter
- Years active: 1994–present

Subhrajit Mitra (born 18 January 1976) is a filmmaker from Kolkata, India. He is known for his work in the Bengali film industry.

== Career ==
Subhrajit Mitra is an Indian filmmaker who works in the Bengali film industry. His 2021 film, Avijatrik ('The wanderlust of Apu'), which is the sequel to the Apu trilogy by Satyajit Ray, is ranked 5th in the list of best South Asian films of 2020, garnering 27 international laurels as of 2022. The film has travelled to 5 continents, 20 cities, and 22 festivals and is considered a modern-day classic by the critics. Personally, Subhrajit has won 9 laurels as the screenplay writer and director of the film.

Mitra started his career at the age of 18 as a documentary director for Doordarshan. He completed his postgraduate diploma in computer science and engineering as well as a part-time two-year diploma course in film direction from the National Institute of Film and Fine Arts. He is also a certificate holder from Harvard University for the department of Classics on Ancient Masterpieces on World Literature. He is the recipient of Rotary Benevolent Club's Iconic Achievers Award 2021. Subhrajit was presented with an Honorary Doctorate degree in Literature [D'litt] by Saint Mother Teresa University, Bangalore, for his profound understanding of the literature-based classics and contribution to the Indian and Bengali cinema as the director and screenwriter.

Subhrajit is the screenplay writer and director of Avijatrik [The wanderlust of Apu]. The film is based on the concluding part of the novel "Aparajito" by Bibhutibhushan Bandopadhyay and is a sequel to the classic "Apu trilogy" by Satyajit Ray. The film was considered a success in the international festival circuits as well as with the domestic audience.

His debut feature film was Mon Amour: Shesher Kobita Revisited in 2008. Mitra has directed 7 feature films, including the Aagunpakhi and Kakababu trilogy by Sunil Ganguly and "Chorabali" a whodunit thriller inspired by Agatha Christie's work. Vorai, a 52-minute film, was Mitra’s first fiction work. It has won 4 major awards across the globe.

Prior to Mon Amour, he has directed and screen-written six documentaries for Doordarshan, the national channel, fifty-two episodes of a documentary-series on the National Network with joint production by ISRO [Indian Space Research Organization], two corporate documentaries for the BM Birla Heart Research Center, a corporate documentary for ONGC, and a promotional docu-fiction on conservation of nature for the Forest Department of West Bengal. Subhrajit researched, scripted, and directed "Wangala"—a documentary film on Garo tribes in the northeast of the Himalayan foothill range, it was well received globally. He was an empaneled filmmaker of National Geographic Channel, Discovery Channel, and History Channel. He has directed a series on the lesser-known tribes of the Himalayas, titled "Himalayas- unsung, unseen" for National Geographic Channel.

Mitra has made a documentary on the 1971 India–Pakistan war and Bangladesh liberation for BSF, produced by the Ministry of Home Affairs, India. Mr. A.R. Rahman has done the score for this documentary. Subhrajit has made a docu-feature on Jesus Christ’s alleged life in India after his proclaimed resurrection, titled "The Unknown Stories of the Messiah". Internationally acclaimed actors such as Soumitra Chatterjee and Aparna Sen have acted in this film. The film premiered at the Cannes Film Market and also got nominated for the "Best International Docu-Feature" award at the Rome International Film Festival. His documentary film on prisoners' children, "Flickering Angels", produced by the Government of India, has travelled to several international festivals.

Subhrajit is well known for his feature films based on the period piece literary classics as well as for some of his groundbreaking documentaries.

Subhrajit has rolled out the plans for his next film, a historical adaptation of Bankim Chandra Chattopadhyay's Devi Choudharni. It will trace the events leading to the rise of the East India Company and Sanyasi Bidroha. Veteran actors like Prasenjit Chatterjee, Srabanti Chatterjee and Indraneel Sengupta have reportedly signed up for leading roles. The film is likely to be one of the most expensive Tollywood projects ever, with Hollywood houses collaborating for the first time in Bengali cinema.

== Filmography ==
=== Feature film ===
- Mon Amour: Shesher Kobita Revisited 2008
- Aagunpakhi 2012
- Kolkatar Jongoley 2013
- Rajbarir Rahashya 2014
- Sinduk Rahashya 2015
- Chorabali 2016
- Avijatrik 2021
- Devi Chowdhurani: Bandit Queen of Bengal 2025
- Maya-Mrigaya 2026

=== Documentary Film ===
- Wangala as a Creative Director
- The unknown stories of the Messiah
- Corporate Documentaries for ONGC & Wildlife dept. W.B.
- Flickering Angels
- The men who saved killapara
