= Byomkesh Bakshi in other media =

Byomkesh Bakshi
- Created by: Sharadindu Bandyopadhyay
- Original work: Satyanweshi (1932)

Print publications
- Books: List of stories: Satyanweshi (1932); Pother Kanta (1932); Seemanto-heera (1932); Raktomukhi Neela (1937); Chitrochor (1951); Durgo Rahasya (1952); Shajarur Kanta (1967)
- Comics: List of comics

Films and television
- Films: Chiriyakhana (1967); Shajarur Kanta (1974); Magno Mainak (2009); Byomkesh Bakshi (2010); Abar Byomkesh (2012); Satyanweshi (2013); Doorbeen (2014); Byomkesh Phire Elo (2014); Shajarur Kanta (2015); Detective Byomkesh Bakshy! (2015); Byomkesh Bakshi (2015); Har Har Byomkesh (2015); Byomkesh O Chiriyakhana (2016); Byomkesh Pawrbo (2016); Baroda O Bohurupi (2016); Byomkesh O Agnibaan (2017); Biday Byomkesh (2018); Byomkesh Gotro (2018); Satyanweshi Byomkesh (2019); Byomkesh Hatyamancha (2022); Byomkesh O Durgo Rahasya (2023)
- Television series: Byomkesh Bakshi (1980s); Byomkesh Bakshi (1993–1997); Byomkesh Bakshi (2004); Byomkesh (2007); Byomkesh (2014–2015); Byomkesh (2017)

Games
- Video game: Detective Byomkesh Bakshy!: The Game

Miscellaneous
- Portrayers: Uttam Kumar; Ajoy Ganguli; Shyamal Ghosal; Rajit Kapur; Sudip Mukherjee; Aneesh See Yay; Saptarshi Roy; Subhrajit Dutta; Gaurav Chakrabarty; Anirban Bhattacharya; Jisshu Sengupta; Abir Chatterjee; Parambrata Chatterjee; Dhritiman Chatterjee; Sushant Singh Rajput; Dev

Byomkesh Bakshi is an Indian-Bengali detective character created by Sharadindu Bandyopadhyay. Referring himself as "truth-seeker" or Satyanweshi in the stories, Bakshi is known for his proficiency with observation, logical reasoning, and forensic science which he uses to solve complicated cases, usually murders occurred. Bakshi, initially appearing in the 1932 story Satyanweshi, the character's popularity immensely increased in Bengal and other parts of India.

Many film, television, radio, audio drama and other adaptations that have been made of Sharadindu Bandyopadhyay's series of detective novels featuring his character, Byomkesh.

== Books ==
Saradindu Bandopadhyay penned 32 Byomkesh stories from 1932 to 1970 prior to his death. In his early stories, Ajit Kumar Banerjee is described as his companion, and chronicler of his stories. But in some cases Ajit also investigates in absence of Byomkesh (examples, Makorshar Rosh, Shoilo Rahasya). The stories are all written in traditional formal Bengali language. However, later the stories shift to more colloquial language. The later stories (Room Nombor Dui, Chhlonar Chhondo, Shajarur Kanta, Benisonghaar and Lohar Biskut) are not penned by Ajit, who was engaged in his publication business.

The stories are not very complicated but very engaging, with a long series of surprising events. The stories present a range of crimes from the first story, Satyanweshi, where Byomkesh destroys an international drug racket, to household mysteries and crimes like Arthamanartham and Makorshar Rosh.

Sharadindu did not want to continue the Byomkesh stories, due to which he stopped writing from 1938 to 1951. During that time he busied himself writing scripts for films in Bombay. After his return to West Bengal, Byomkesh stories were still in demand so he wrote Chitrachor (Picture Imperfect) in 1951 and other stories gradually on to 1970, when his last story "Bishupal Badh" (Killing of Bishupal) was left incomplete owing to his untimely death.

=== List ===
There are 32 published and 1 unpublished Byomkesh stories. The list is chronologically arranged.

Color key

- indicates "story".
- indicates "novel".
- indicates unfinished writings.

Novel/Story	English title	Year of publication	Details of First English Translation			Characters	
Novel/Story	English title	Year of publication	Title of Book	Name of Story in Translation	Translator	Ajit	Satyabati
Satyanweshi	The Truth-Seeker	1932	Picture Imperfect and Other Byomkesh Bakshi Mysteries	The Inquisitor	Sreejata Guha	Yes	No
Pother Kanta	The Gramophone Pin Killer	1932	Picture Imperfect and Other Byomkesh Bakshi Mysteries	The Gramophone Pin Mystery	Sreejata Guha	Yes	No
Seemanto-heera	The Hidden Heirloom	1932	Byomkesh Bakshi Stories	The Hidden Heirloom	Monimala Dhar	Yes	No
Makorshar Rosh	The Tarantula's Juice	1933	Picture Imperfect and Other Byomkesh Bakshi Mysteries	The Venom of Tarantula	Sreejata Guha	Yes	No
Arthamanartham	The Worthless Fortune	1933	Picture Imperfect and Other Byomkesh Bakshi Mysteries	Where There's a Will	Sreejata Guha	Yes	Yes
Chorabali	The Quicksand	1933	Byomkesh Bakshi Stories	Quicksand	Monimala Dhar	Yes	No
Agnibaan	The Calamity Aflame	1935	Picture Imperfect and Other Byomkesh Bakshi Mysteries	Calamity Strikes	Sreejata Guha	Yes	No
Uposonghaar	The Last Encounter	1935	Picture Imperfect and Other Byomkesh Bakshi Mysteries	An Encore for Byomkesh	Sreejata Guha	Yes	No
Raktomukhi Neela	The Bloody Sapphire	1936	Byomkesh Bakshi Stories	The Deadly Diamond	Monimala Dhar	Yes	No
Byomkesh O Boroda	Byomkesh and Boroda	1936	The Rhythm of Riddles : Three Byomkesh Bakshi Mysteries	Byomkesh and Barada	Arunava Sinha	Yes	No
Chitrochor	Picture Imperfect	1951	Picture Imperfect and Other Byomkesh Bakshi Mysteries	Picture Imperfect	Sreejata Guha	Yes	Yes
Durgo Rahasya	The Mystery of the Fortress	1952	The Mystery of the Fortress and Other Stories	The Mystery of the Fortress	Shankar Sen	Yes	Yes
Chiriyakhana	The Menagerie	1953	The Menagerie and Other Byomkesh Bakshi Mysteries	The Menagerie	Sreejata Guha	Yes	No
Adim Ripu	The Pristine Enemy	1955				Yes	No
Banhi-patanga	The Moth and the Flame	1956				Yes	Yes
Rokter Daag	The Fault in The Bloodline	1956		The Bloodline	Monimala Dhar	Yes	Yes
Monimondon	The Jewel Case	1958	The Menagerie and Other Byomkesh Bakshi Mysteries	The Jewel Case	Sreejata Guha	Yes	Yes
Amriter Mrityu	The Death of Amrito	1959	The Rhythm of Riddles : Three Byomkesh Bakshi Mysteries	The Death of Amrito	Arunava Sinha	Yes	No
Shailo Rahasya	The Phantom Client	1959	Byomkesh Bakshi Stories	The Phantom Client	Monimala Dhar	Yes	
Achin Pakhi	The Unknown Prey	1960	Byomkesh Bakshi Stories	The Avenger	Monimala Dhar	Yes	No
Kohen Kobi Kalidas	Thus Spoke the Poet Kalidasa	1961	The Mystery of the Fortress and Other Stories	This Spoke the Poet Kalidasa	Shankar Sen	Yes	
Adrishyo Trikon	The Invisible Triangle	1961	The Mystery of the Fortress and Other Stories	The Invisible Triangle	Shankar Sen	Yes	No
Khuji Khuji Nari	The Case of the Missing Will	1961	The Menagerie and Other Byomkesh Bakshi Mysteries	The Will that Vanished	Sreejata Guha	Yes	No
Adwitiyo	The Only One	1961	Adventures of Byomkesh Bakshi. Volume 2	Adwitiya	Mishul Das	Yes	Yes
Mognomoinak	The Magnificent	1963				Yes	
Dushtochokro	The Crooked Circle	1963	The Mystery of the Fortress and Other Stories	The Crooked Circle	Shankar Sen	Yes	
Henyalir Chhondo	The Rhythm of Riddles	1964	The Rhythm of Riddles : Three Byomkesh Bakshi Mysteries	The Rhythm of Riddles	Arunava Sinha	Yes	Yes
Room Nombor Dui	Room No. 2	1964	Byomkesh Bakshi Stories	Room Number Two	Monimala Dhar	No	Yes
Cholonar Chhondo	The Vengeful Collision	1965	Byomkesh Bakshi Stories	The Man in a Red Coat	Monimala Dhar	No	Yes
Shajarur Kanta	The Quills of the Porcupine	1967	The Menagerie and Other Byomkesh Bakshi Mysteries	The Quills of the Porcupine	Sreejata Guha	Yes	Yes
Benishonghar	The Annihilation of Beni	1968				No	Yes
Lohar Biskut	The Iron Biscuits	1969	The Mystery of the Fortress and Other Stories	The Iron Biscuits	Shankar Sen	No	Yes
Bishupal Bodh (unfinished)	The Annihilation of Bishu Paal	1970					

== Television and streaming ==
Actor Gaurav Chakrabarty won a Tele Academy Award (Best actor in a leading role) in 2014 for his role as Byomkesh Bakshi for Byomkesh.

Year	Series	Actor	Director	Aired on
1980s	Byomkesh Bakshi	Ajoy Ganguli		DD Bangla
1993, 1997	Byomkesh Bakshi	Rajit Kapur	Basu Chatterjee	DD National
2004	Byomkesh Bakshi	Sudip Mukherjee	Swapan Ghoshal	DD Bangla
2007	Byomkesh	Saptarshi Roy	Swapan Ghoshal	Tara Muzik
2014	Byomkesh	Gaurav Chakrabarty	Amit Sengupta, Gopal Chakraborty, Joydeep Mukherjee	Colors Bangla
2017	Byomkesh	Anirban Bhattacharya	Sayantan Ghoshal, Soumik Chattopadhay, Soumik Halder	Hoichoi
2023	Durgo Rawhoshyo	Anirban Bhattacharya	Srijit Mukherji	Hoichoi
2026	Byomkesh	Gaurav Chakrabarty	Shruti Das, Arna Mukhopadh	Addatimes

- Sushant Singh Rajput and Anand Tiwari reprised their roles from Detective Byomkesh Bakshy! in a 2015 episode of the long running Indian TV Series C.I.D. to promote the films.
- Actor Abir Chatterjee and Ritwick Chakraborty promoted the film Byomkesh Pawrbo in a daily soap Goyenda Ginni in Zee Bangla, as themselves respectively.

== Radio ==
The Sunday Suspense series of 98.3 Radio Mirchi (Kolkata) adapted several novels of Byomkesh Bakshi for audio stories which include Satyanweshi, Pother Kanta, Simanta Heera, Makorshar Rosh, Agnibaan, Roktomukhi Neela, Khunji Khunji Nari, Arthamanartham, Chorabali, Adwitiyo, Monimondon, Cholonar Chondo, Lohar Biscuit, Achin Pakhi, Sajarur Kanta, Durgo Rohosyo and Chitrachor, performed by Mir Afsar Ali as Byomkesh and Deep as Ajit. However, Mir left radio and Gaurav Chakrabarty replaced him. Nearly 2 years later, Deep also left Radio Mirchi and he was replaced by Shekhar. Gaurav has played Byomkesh in Banhi Patanga, Rakter Daag, Magnomoinak, Benisonghar, Chiriyakhana and Adim Ripu.

== Audio drama ==
The Satyanweshi audio drama series created by actor Aneesh See Yay adapted twenty two novels and eight original audio dramas of Byomkesh Bakshi in Malayalam Language

Year	Original title	English title	Based On	Ref.
2019	Satyanweshi	The Truth Seeker	Satyanweshi (novel)	
2019	Pathayile Mullu	The Thorn of The Path	Pother Kanta	
2019	Agni Asthram	The Fire Weapon	Agnibaan	
2019	Upasamharam	The Epilogue	Upashonghar	
2019	Vilpathrathinte Rahasyam	The Secret of Bequeath	Khunji Khunji Nari	
2019	Bhootham	The Ghost	Byomkesh O Boroda	
2019	Vamshathinte Kolapathakam	The Successor's Murder	Rokter Daag	
2019	Chathuppile Chathi	The Deception With a Swamp	Chorabali	
2019	Chakravyooham	The Labyrinth	Dushtochokro	
2020	Chilanthiyude Visham	The Venom of Spider	Makorshar Rosh	
2020	Maranathinte Chathikkuzhi	The Death Trap	Cholonar Chhondo	
2020	Amoolya Vajram	The Precious Diamond	Seemanto-Heera	
2020	Akjatha Kolapathaki	The Unknown Murderer	Achin Pakhi	
2020	Raktham Puranda Indraneelam	The Bloody Sapphire	Roktomukhi Neela	
2020	Chithram Katta Kallan	The Picture Thief	Chitrochor	
2020	Randaamathe Muri	The Second Room	Room Nombor Dui	
2020	Prahelika	The Riddle	Henyalir Chhondo	
2020	Bomkesh AD 7907	An Epic Voyage To The Future	Original Story by Aneesh See Yay	
2020	Rahasyangalude Kotta	The Fortress of Secrets	Durgo Rahasya	
2020	Adhirshya Thrikonam	The Invisible Triangle	Adrishyo Trikon	
2020	Thalam Thettiya Manassu	The Rhythm Less Mind	Original Story by Aneesh See Yay	
2020	Jailpulli	The Incarcerated	Original Story by Aneesh See Yay	
2022	Soothradharan	The Mastermind	Original Story by Aneesh See Yay	
2022	Pracheena Shathru	The Ancient Enemy	Original Story by Aneesh See Yay	
2022	Uttama Kallan	The Perfect Thief	Original Story by Aneesh See Yay	
2022	RasaThanthram	The Chemistry Trick	Original Story by Aneesh See Yay	
2022	AthulyaN	The Matchless	Adwitiyo	
2023	Vajramala	The Necklace	Monimondon	
2023	Amrithinte Maranam	The Death of Amrit	Amriter Mrityu	
2023	Velluvili	The Challenge	Original Story by Aneesh See Yay	

== Films ==
Indicates they are part of Star Productions film series
Indicates they are part of Anjan Dutt film series
Indicates they are part of Shree Venkatesh Films film series
Indicates they are part of Yash Raj Films film

Year	Title	Byomkesh Bakshi	Ajit	Director	Based on	Producer	Ref.
1967	Chiriyakhana	Uttam Kumar	Shailen Mukherjee	Satyajit Ray	Chiriyakhana	Star Productions	
1974	Shajarur Kanta	Shyamal Ghosal	Shailen Mukherjee	Manju Dey	Shajarur Kanta	Manju Dey	
2009	Magno Mainak	Subhrajit Dutta	Rajarshi Mukherjee	Swapan Ghosal	Magno Mainak	New Wave Communications	
2010	Byomkesh Bakshi	Abir Chatterjee	Saswata Chatterjee	Anjan Dutt	Adim Ripu	Kaustuv Roy	
2012	Abar Byomkesh	Abir Chatterjee	Saswata Chatterjee	Anjan Dutt	Chitra Chor	Rana Sarkar	
2013	Satyanweshi	Sujoy Ghosh	Anindya Chatterjee	Rituporno Ghosh	Chorabali	Shree Venkatesh Films	
2014	Byomkesh Phire Elo	Abir Chatterjee	Saswata Chatterjee	Anjan Dutt	Beni Sanghar	Kaustuv Roy	
2014	Doorbeen	Soumitra Chatterjee	Rajat Ganguly	Swagato Chowdhury	Feluda-Byomkesh combination (Original Story)	Saikat Mitra	
2015	Shajarur Kanta	Dhritiman Chatterjee	Pradip Mukherjee	Saibal Mitra	Shajarur Kanta	Pradip Churiwal, Saikat Mitra	
2015	Detective Byomkesh Bakshy!	Sushant Singh Rajput	Anand Tiwari	Dibakar Banerjee	Loosely based on Satyanweshi	Aditya Chopra, Dibakar Banerjee	
2015	Byomkesh Bakshi	Jisshu Sengupta	Saswata Chatterjee	Anjan Dutt	Kohen Kobi Kaalidas	Kaustuv Roy	
2015	Har Har Byomkesh	Abir Chatterjee	Ritwick Chakraborty	Arindam Sil	Banhi Patanga	Shree Venkatesh Films	
2016	Byomkesh O Chiriyakhana	Jisshu Sengupta	Saswata Chatterjee	Anjan Dutt	Chiriyakhana	Kaustuv Roy	
2016	Byomkesh Pawrbo	Abir Chatterjee	Ritwick Chakraborty	Arindam Sil	Amriter Mrityu	Shree Venkatesh Films	
2016	Baroda O Bohurupi	Subrata Roy (cameo appearance)		Neelotpal Sinharoy	Bohurupi	Bijoli Prosad Sinharoy; Haraprosad Sinharoy; Amiya Sinharoy	
2017	Byomkesh O Agnibaan	Jisshu Sengupta	Saswata Chatterjee	Anjan Dutt	Satyanweshi,Agnibaan and Upasanghar	Kaustuv Roy	
2018	Biday Byomkesh	Abir Chatterjee	Rahul Banerjee	Debaloy Bhattacharaya	Original story	Shree Venkatesh Films	
2018	Byomkesh Gotro	Abir Chatterjee	Rahul Banerjee	Arindam Sil	Rakter Daag	Shree Venkatesh Films	
2019	Satyanweshi Byomkesh	Parambrata Chatterjee	Rudranil Ghosh	Sayantan Ghosal	Magno Mainak	Greentouch Entertainment	
2022	Byomkesh Hatyamancha	Abir Chatterjee	Suhotro Mukhopadhyay	Arindam Sil	Bishupal Badh	Shree Venkatesh Films	
2023	Byomkesh O Durgo Rahasya	Dev	Ambarish Bhattacharya	Birsa Dasgupta	Durgo Rahasya	Shadow Films; Dev Entertainment Ventures; PVR Inox Pictures	

== Video games ==
A hidden objects game for mobile devices called Detective Byomkesh Bakshy!: The Game was released by Games2win in 2015.

== Legacy ==
- A popular fictional detective named "Vyomkesh", has been referenced by Sita in Amish Tripathi's book Sita: Warrior of Mithila.
- He was referred in The Big Bang Theory episode named "The Mommy Observation".

== See also ==
- Sharadindu Bandyopadhyay
- Uttam Kumar
- Rajit Kapur
- Gaurav Chakrabarty
