= Magno Mainak =

2009 film directed by Swapan Ghosal

- DVD cover
- Directed by: Swapan Ghosal
- Based on: Magno Mainak by Sharadindu Bandyopadhyay
- Produced by: New Wave Communications
- Music by: Debjit
- Production company: New Wave Communications
- Release date: 11 September 2009
- Country: India
- Language: Bengali

Magno Mainak is a 2009 crime thriller based on the novel of the same name by Sharadindu Bandyopadhyay. It was directed by Swapan Ghosal and produced by New Wave Communications.

This is the third Byomkesh Bakshi film adaptation. Subhrajit Dutta played Byomkesh while Rajarshi Mukherjee played Ajit Kumar Banerjee. Piyali Munshi, Rupanjana Mitra, Gargi Roychowdhury and Biplab Chatterjee acted in other roles.

== Production ==
Director Swapan Ghoshal made two Byomkesh Bakshi TV series before this film. Byomkesh Bakshi in 2004 aired on DD Bangla. Another is a short-lived series Byomkesh in 2007, which aired on Tara Muzik. After these successful series Swapan Ghoshal decided to make a full-length feature film. He made it in 2009 with Sharadindu Bandyopadhyay's Magno Mainak adaptation.

== See also ==
- Shajarur Kanta (1974 film)
- Byomkesh Bakshi
- Abar Byomkesh
- Byomkesh Phire Elo
- Satyanweshi
- Shajarur Kanta (2015 film)
