= Satyanweshi =

Satyanweshi (lit. 'truth seeker') may refer to:

- Satyanweshi (novel), a 1934 novel by Sharadindu Bandyopadhyay, first in the Byomkesh Bakshi series about the eponymous Indian detective
  - Satyanweshi (film), a 2013 Indian Bengali-language film
  - "Satyanweshi", the first episode of the 1993 Indian TV series Byomkesh Bakshi
  - "Satyanweshi", the first episode of the 2014 Indian TV series Byomkesh
  - "Satyanweshi", the first episode of the 2017 Indian web series Byomkesh
  - Satyanweshi Byomkesh, a 2019 Indian Bengali-language film

== See also ==
- Truth seeker (disambiguation)
- Byomkesh Bakshi
