= Shajarur Kanta (2015 film) =

2015 Indian Bengali film

- Poster of the film.
- Directed by: Saibal Mitra
- Based on: Shajarur Kanta by Sharadindu Bandyopadhyay
- Produced by: Pradip Churiwal; Saikat Mitra
- Starring: Dhritiman Chatterjee; Pradip Mukherjee; Indraneil Sengupta; Konkona Sen Sharma; Mayukh Dutta
- Cinematography: Samit Gupta
- Edited by: Sumit Ghosh
- Music by: Tejendra Narayan Majumdar
- Production company: Macneill Media Pvt. Ltd.
- Release date: 20 March 2015
- Running time: 178 minutes
- Country: India
- Language: Bengali

Shajarur Kanta is a 2015 Byomkesh Bakshi mystery film based on the novel of same name by Sharadindu Bandyopadhyay. The film is directed by Saibal Mitra, and produced by Pradip Churiwal and Saikat Mitra. It is the second Shajarur Kanta film adaptation in Bengali, the other being the 1974 film of same name.

== Plot ==
The film begins with a drama performance by a group theater ‘Swapnochari’. Deepa who plays the lead role, is the star of the evening, but expresses no joy despite the audience's approval. Next week, she is being married off, against her wishes, to a young industrialist by the name of Debashish Bhatto and this is her last show. Deepa has nothing against Debashis. He is good-looking, extremely well-to-do and interested in the arts, but she is in love with someone else. She dare not tell her family about him because all hell would then break loose.

Nripati Laha, the founder member of the group, and Deepa's brother Vijay look forward to the wedding as they both have much to gain from this alliance. Nripati hopes to get a solid sponsorship for the Swapnochari through Debashis's ‘Bhatta Group of Industries’. However, there are several others who are not so happy. Prabal Gupta, the director of the group theater is not only unhappy, but angry at the bargain. He considers Deepa to be his creation as he is the one who had trained her painstakingly into becoming the actress she is today. Deepa leaving the group means that the lead actress would be gone. Deepa's wedding takes place right on schedule the week after the show. All the members of the group attend and all put up a joyous front. Debashis is already enchanted by his beautiful bride; the only thing that bothers him is the sullen expression on her face.

Debashis's fleeting anxiety about his bride's state of mind turns out to be eerily clairvoyant. When he tries to pull her into his arms after they are alone in their flower-bedecked bedroom that night, she draws back and informs him that she is in love with someone else. Debashis is stunned.

Debashis takes some time to digest this, but eventually offers to give her a divorce so that she can marry the man she loves. However, Deepa is not ready for that either. It would be impossible for her to go back to her family. She pleads with him to let her stay on in his household as his legal wife until her lover is ready. Then she will ask him to grant her a divorce.

The very same night — the night of Deepa's wedding –a beggar is killed on the streets of Kolkata. The sky is strangely dark and, just before the murder, crows gather inexplicably on the overhead wires and railings of the nearby park as if in foreboding of something evil. No one pays much attention to the news of the murder the next morning and among those who do; many feel that there are too many beggars in Kolkata anyway. In any case, the story is hardly noticed as it is featured in a small unnoticeable corner in one of the back pages. Such murders are common enough occurrences in big cities to merit much attention; the only thing uncommon being the murder weapon: a porcupine quill driven clean through the heart of the victim from the back.

One person does notice it though — Byomkesh Bakshi whose habit it is to read several papers from end to end every morning looking for exactly such small, unnoticed stories. As Byomkesh tells his dear friend and assistant Ajit of the incident and rues the fact that killers of Kolkata are becoming creative these days, footsteps are heard on the staircase outside followed by the ringing of the doorbell. It is Deepa's brother Vijay. He looks distraught and appeals to Byomkesh for help. It appears that Vijay had been to visit Debashis and Deepa the morning after the wedding and that Debashis had blamed him and Nripati squarely for having been architects of this marriage when they knew fully well that Deepa had a secret lover. Debashis also told him that the marriage had not been consummated because of this complication. Vijay now wants Byomkesh to help him find Deepa's secret lover. Once he knows the guy's name, Vijay will fix him so that he never dares to disturb Deepa again. Byomkesh tells Vijay that his job is not to look for secret lovers of women especially since in this case, Deepa is in no way to blame for a marriage that has been forced upon her. Byomkesh is far more interested in the mystery of the beggar murdered with the porcupine quill. Coincidentally, the DC DD of Kolkata police has just rung him up to solicit his help in solving the strange case of the porcupine quill murder.

Meanwhile, Deepa's unusual married life continues. She and Debashis are courteous to each other, but no more than that. They sleep in separate bedrooms but put up an appearance of conjugal bliss in front of outsiders. Deepa refuses to meet anyone, especially her family members; she remains mainly at home and keeps entirely to herself. Soon after, she receives a gift packet with no name on it. When she opens it, she finds a beautiful pair of designer earrings made of some strange horn like substance. She puts them on, more out of curiosity than anything else, and then decides to keep them on as they are so striking in appearance. Yet another gift comes along — this time from ’a real sender’. Debashis hands her a mobile phone. He has been feeling sorry for her despite what she has done to him and has bought her the phone so that she may at least keep in touch with her friends.

Once she is alone in her room, Deepa starts sending text messages to a certain number instead of calling anyone. The killer does indeed strike again, very soon. In fact, the strange marriage and even stranger murders play themselves out like unconnected tracks running parallel to each other. Terror grips the city after this. The Porcupine has struck twice in the same night. Television channels pitch in enthusiastically. Kapil's editor is delighted and puts him on the job of covering the grisly crimes. Kapil is on his toes all day, reporting continuously from the scenes of the recent murders.

== Cast ==
- Dhritiman Chatterjee as Byomkesh Bakshi
- Pradip Mukherjee as Ajit Bandyopadhyay
- Sonali Gupta Basu as Satyabati
- Rajat Ganguly as Inspector Rakhal
- Indraneil Sengupta as Debasish Bhatta
- Konkona Sen Sharma as Deepa Bhatta
- Kaushik Sen as Prabal Gupta
- Debdut Ghosh as Sujan Mitra
- Biswajit Chakraborty as Nripati Laha
- Kanchana Maitra as Subhra Ghosh
- Dwijen Bandopadhyay as Bijoy Madhab Mukherjee
- Nilendra Dewan as Kharag Bahadur
- Subrata Guha Roy as Kapil Bose

== Critical reception ==
Madhusree Ghosh of The Times of India two and a half star out of five, and said: "Sajarur Kanta, the original story, is a readers' favourite and Saradindu, being a scriptwriter himself, handled the story like a film's plotline. Here, though, Saibal Mitra has given his imagination a free run in the name of turning the plot into a contemporary story. As a result, the motive, characters, denouement and circumstances are all changed. What we are served with is a three-hour yawn fest.

Konkona as Deepa and Indraneil as Debasish have done a decent job. Their chemistry is crackling but the script doesn't allow the romance to bloom. Moreover, Dhritiman's Byomkesh is quite far removed from the character we know, speaking English with a British accent and effecting theatrical expressions and dramatic entrances. Kaushik Sen's Prabal is intense but falls victim to a poor script. The film is touted as a thriller, but thanks to the poor editing there is little of that thrill left by the time the end credits roll."

== See also ==
- Byomkesh Bakshi
- Abar Byomkesh
- Byomkesh Phire Elo
- Satyanweshi
