= Byomkesh O Chiriyakhana =

2016 film by Anjan Dutt

- Theatrical release poster
- Directed by: Anjan Dutt
- Based on: Chiriyakhana by Sharadindu Bandyopadhyay
- Produced by: Kaustav Roy
- Starring: Jisshu Sengupta; Saswata Chatterjee; Shantilal Mukherjee; Priyanka Sarkar; Saayoni Ghosh; Kanchan Mullick; Neel Mukherjee
- Narrated by: Saswata Chattopadhyay
- Edited by: Arghyakamal Mitra
- Music by: Neel Dutt
- Production company: RP Techvision (I) Pvt. Ltd.
- Release date: 7 October 2016
- Country: India
- Language: Bengali

Byomkesh O Chiriyakhana is a 2016 Indian Thriller film on Bengali fictional detective Byomkesh Bakshi. The role of Byomkesh Bakshi is portrayed by Jisshu Sengupta. The film is directed by Anjan Dutt. This is the fifth installment of Byomkesh series by Anjan Dutt, serving as a sequel to Byomkesh Bakshi. The film is based on Chiriyakhana by Sharadindu Bandyopadhyay.

== Cast ==
- Jisshu Sengupta as Byomkesh Bakshi
- Saswata Chatterjee as Ajit Bandyopadhyay
- Ushasie Chakraborty as Satyabati
- Shantilal Mukherjee as Nishanath Sen
- Dulal Lahiri as Nepal Gupta
- Priyanka Sarkar as Banalaxmi/Sunayana/Nityakali/Nita
- Saayoni Ghosh as Mukul
- Riju Biswas as Bijoy Sen
- Neel Mukherjee (actor) as Dr. Bhujangadhar
- Kanchan Mullick as Mushkil Miya
- Sagnik Chatterjee as Brajadas
- Ankita Chakraborty as Damayanti
- Kanchana Moitra as Najar Bibi
- Mrinal Mukherjee as Ramen Mallick
- Subhra Sourav Das as Panugopal
- Anjan Dutt as Kokonad Gupta (cameo)

== Sequel ==
Anjan Dutt's cameo in this film as Kokonad Gupta, hints the sequel will be based on the story Agnibaan by Sharadindu Bandyopadhyay.

== See also ==
- Abar Byomkesh
