= Shajarur Kanta (1974 film) =

- Directed by: Manju Dey
- Based on: Shajarur Kanta by Sharadindu Bandyopadhyay
- Produced by: Manju Dey
- Starring: Shyamal Ghosal; Satindra Bhattacharya; Shailen Mukherjee; Pahari Sanyal; Tarun Kumar; Sambhu Bhattachayra; Gita Dey
- Cinematography: Anil Gupta; Jyoti Laha
- Music by: Sudhin Dasgupta
- Production company: Star Productions
- Release date: 27 September 1974
- Country: India
- Language: Bengali

Shajarur Kanta is a 1974 Byomkesh Bakshi film based on the novel of the same name by Sharadindu Bandyopadhyay. The film was directed and produced by actress-turned-director Manju Dey.

== Cast ==
- Shyamal Ghosal as Byomkesh Bakshi
- Shailen Mukherjee as Ajit Kumar Banerjee
- Satindra Bhattacharya
- Pahari Sanyal
- Tarun Kumar
- Sambhu Bhattachayra
- Gita Dey
- Manju Dey

== Soundtrack ==
Shajarur Kanta

Soundtrack album by Sudhin Dasgupta
- Released: 1974
- Recorded: 1974
- Producer: Star Productions

All lyrics are written by Pulak Bandyopadhyay; all music is composed by Sudhin Dasgupta.

Songs
No.	Title	Playback	Length
1.	"Bidhatar Ei Jagate"	Manna Dey	3:06

== See also ==
- Byomkesh Bakshi
- Abar Byomkesh
- Byomkesh Phire Elo
- Satyanweshi
