= Durgo Rahasya =

1952 novel by Sharadindu Bandyopadhyay

The Mystery of the Fortress
- Author: Sharadindu Bandyopadhyay
- Original title: Durgo Rahasya (দুর্গরহস্য)
- Language: Bengali
- Series: Byomkesh Bakshi
- Genre: Detective, crime, mystery
- Publisher: P.C. Sorkar and Sons, also anthologized by Ananda Publishers
- Publication date: 1952 in hardcover Byomkesher diary and in the Sharadindu Omnibus in 1972
- Publication place: India
- Media type: Print (hardback & paperback)
- Pages: 182 pp
- Preceded by: Chitrochor
- Followed by: Chiriyakhana

Durgo Rahasya (Bengali: দুর্গরহস্য, romanized: Durgarahasya, lit. 'The Mystery of the Fortress') is an adventure detective novel written in 1952 by Sharadindu Bandyopadhyay.

== Plot ==
=== Past ===
The story starts with the history of the Fort. Janikaram is king who got his title from Nawab Alibardar, setting up his family in the Fort, soon after the death Mughal emperor Aurangzeb. His descendants, Rajaram and son Jayram are the rulers during the Indian Rebellion of 1857, during which the British troops head towards the Fort, to loot. Sending the women, children and servants to a safe place, the father-son duo start hiding the treasure though they are late, falling into the hands of the British troops. A few months later, their family finds them missing, apparently dead, with the treasure hidden in a place that they do not know about. Their family moves far way, and after 3 more generations, two brothers born into the family, Rambinod and Ramkishore Singh, decide to buy the Fort and revive their family's glory. However, Rambinod dies of cholera, leaving Ramkishore alone to handle their growing business, finally amassing enough wealth to buy the land around the Fort, building a mansion adjacent to it to live with his family.

=== Present ===
Byomkesh and Ajit receive a letter from DCP Purandar Pandey, mentioning the suspicious death of Professor Ishaan Chandra Majumdar, Byomkesh's former college teacher. Finding the case interesting, the duo leave Kolkata, leaving a pregnant Satyabati with her brother Sukumar.

The meeting with the family leaves Byomkesh suspicious. He and Ajit start living in the Fort, to study the family better. Ramkishore Singh has 5 children; Bangshidhar, Murlidhar, Haripriya, Gadadhar and Tulsi. Bangshidhar's wife died of suspected suicide, whereas Haripriya died of snakebite, during the family's annual picnic in the jungle.

Finding clues from Prof. Majumdar's notebook, Byomkesh embarks on an adventure to find the culprit, finding the location of the treasure on the way.

== Characters ==
- Byomkesh Bakshi
- Ajit Bandyopadhyay
- Satyabati
- DSP Purandar Pandey
- Dr.Ashwini Ghatak
- Professor Ishan Chandra Majumder
- Sadhu Rambinod Singh
- Ramkishore Singh
- Secretary Chandmohan Dutta
- Bangshidhar Singh
- Manilal
- Murlidhar Singh
- Haripriya
- Ramapati
- Tulsi
- Gadadhar Singh
- Ganapat (servant)
- Sitaram
- Munshi Ataullah
- Bulaki Lal (coachman)
- Himangshu (lawyer)

== Adaptations ==
=== Television ===
- This was one of the stories of the 1993 TV series Byomkesh Bakshi titled "Kile Ka Rahasya", that were recreated for broadcasting on Doordarshan, the Indian national network, by Basu Chatterjee, and immediately went on to become one of the most memorable episodes.
- The story was adapted into another TV series in 2014, Byomkesh, which aired on Bengali channel ETV Bangla.

=== Web series ===
- This is the last of all the stories adapted into series in which Bengali film actor Anirban Bhattacharya played the role of Byomkesh. However, the adaptation of this story is not directly related to Byomkesh, and is a spin-off of the original series.

=== Film ===
- In 2023, Byomkesh O Durgo Rahasya, a film based on this novel, directed by Birsa Dasgupta was released. Dev plays the character of Byomkesh Bakshi.
