= Byomkesh O Agnibaan =

2017 Bengali thriller film by Anjan Dutt

Byomkesh O Agniban
- Theatrical release poster
- ব্যোমকেশ ও অগ্নিবাণ
- Directed by: Anjan Dutt
- Written by: Sharadindu Bandyopadhyay
- Screenplay by: Anjan Dutt
- Based on: Agniban and Upasanghar by Sharadindu Bandyopadhyay
- Produced by: Kaustav Roy; Ashok Dhanuka
- Starring: Jisshu Sengupta; Saswata Chatterjee
- Cinematography: Gairik Sarkar
- Edited by: Arghyakamal Mitra
- Music by: Neel Dutta
- Production companies: R.P. Techvision; Eskay Movies
- Release date: 22 September 2017
- Running time: 105 min
- Language: Bengali

Byomkesh O Agniban (2017) is a Bengali-language Detective thriller film directed by Anjan Dutt and produced by Kaustav Roy and Ashok Dhanuka. The movie features Jisshu Sengupta as the sleuth Byomkesh Bakshi. This is based on compilation of the stories Agniban and Upasanghar written by Sharadindu Bandyopadhyay. This is the sixth installment of Byomkesh series by Anjan Dutt, serving as a sequel to Byomkesh O Chiriyakhana.

== Plot ==
The movie merged two stories of Sharadundu Bandopadhyay named Agnibaan and Uposonghar. The film starts with the hint of another story Satyanweshi where young Byomkesh caught the head of a cocaine racket who is now seeking revenge. On the other hand, a young girl dies in mysterious condition having a match stick in her hand. One Kokonad Gupta, who claims to be a fan of Byomkesh gifts him a matchbox.

== Cast ==
- Jisshu Sengupta as Byomkesh
- Saswata Chatterjee as Ajit
- Swastika Mukherjee as Malati
- Ushasie Chakraborty as Satyabati
- Anjan Dutt as Kokonad Gupta/Doctor Anukul
- Sumatra Mukherjee as Debkumar
- Debduth Ghosh as Dr. Rudra
- Soumendra Bhattacharya
- Aritra Sengupta
- Ankita Chakraborty as Bar dancer
