= Byomkesh Bakshi (2010 film) =

2010 Indian Bengali film by Anjan Dutt

- DVD cover of the film
- Directed by: Anjan Dutt
- Screenplay by: Anjan Dutt
- Based on: Adim Ripu by Sharadindu Bandyopadhyay
- Produced by: Kaustuv Ray
- Starring: Abir Chatterjee
- Edited by: Arghyakamal Mitra
- Music by: Neel Dutt
- Production company: RP Techvision (I) Pvt. Ltd.
- Release date: 13 August 2010 (Kolkata)
- Running time: 136 mins
- Country: India
- Language: Bengali

Byomkesh Bakshi is an Indian Bengali-language crime drama film about the exploits of the fictional detective Byomkesh Bakshi. It is directed by Anjan Dutt and produced by Kaustuv Ray. The film was released on 13 August 2010 and spawned five sequels till date, including Abar Byomkesh (2012), Byomkesh Phire Elo (2014), Byomkesh Bakshi (2015), Byomkesh O Chiriyakhana (2016) and Byomkesh O Agnibaan (2017).

== Plot ==
Byomkesh Bakshi is a Bengali detective (though he likes to be addressed as Satyanweshi, eng. truthseeker) who takes on another spine-chilling case with Ajit Kumar Banerjee, his friend who is a novelist.

The story Adim Ripu starts off with local goon Bantul Sardar offering firearms left behind by departed American WW-II soldiers to Byomkesh and Ajit in their Harrison Road, Kolkata residence. Sardar's departure is quickly followed by the arrival of Miss Nanibala Roy. Ms. Roy has an adopted son Prabhat Roy, who is also the foster-son of rich businessman Anadi Halder. Halder being single lets Ms. Nanibala Roy manages his household.

Halder has two nephews Nimai and Nitai who obviously have ill feelings towards Prabhat in the context of the inheritance of Halder's riches. Additionally, Halder had recently blocked Prabhat from marrying a girl he likes, and it is suspected that Nimai and Nitai have something to do with this.

Ms. Nanibala Roy is apprehensive about her adopted son's safety.

Anadi Halder is murdered, and the story takes a fascinating turn with an extremely surprising ending.

== Cast ==
- Abir Chatterjee as Byomkesh Bakshi
- Saswata Chatterjee as Ajit
- Ushasie Chakraborty as Satyabati
- Arindol Bagchi as Nripen/Nyapa
- Kalyan Chatterjee as Keshto Das
- Swagata Banerjee as Miss Nanibala Roy
- Rudranil Ghosh as Prabhat
- Chandan Sen as Bantul
- Pijush Ganguly as Gadananda
- Biswajit Chakraborty as Anadi Haldar
- Swastika Mukherjee as Shiuli Majumdar

== Sequels ==
=== Abar Byomkesh (2012) ===
A sequel of this film Abar Byomkesh was released on 23 March 2012.

=== Byomkesh Phire Elo (2014) ===
Dutt made another sequel named Byomkesh Phire Elo which was released on 19 December 2014.

=== Byomkesh Bakshi (2015) ===
The third sequel starring Jisshu Sengupta as Bakshi instead was released on 16 October 2015.

== See also ==
- Byomkesh Bakshi
- Sharadindu Bandyopadhyay
- Abar Byomkesh
- Satyanweshi
- Detective Byomkesh Bakshi
