= Truth seeker =

Truth seeker(s) may refer to:

== Television ==
- The Truth Seekers, a 2016 Singaporean TV series
- Truth Seekers, a 2020 British TV series
- "Truth Seekers" (Helluva Boss), a 2021 episode of Helluva Boss

== Other uses ==
- The Truth Seeker, an American periodical
- Truth seeker (term), a term used by conspiracy theorists to describe themselves

== See also ==
- Satyanweshi (disambiguation)
