= Ushasie Chakraborty =

Indian actress and politician

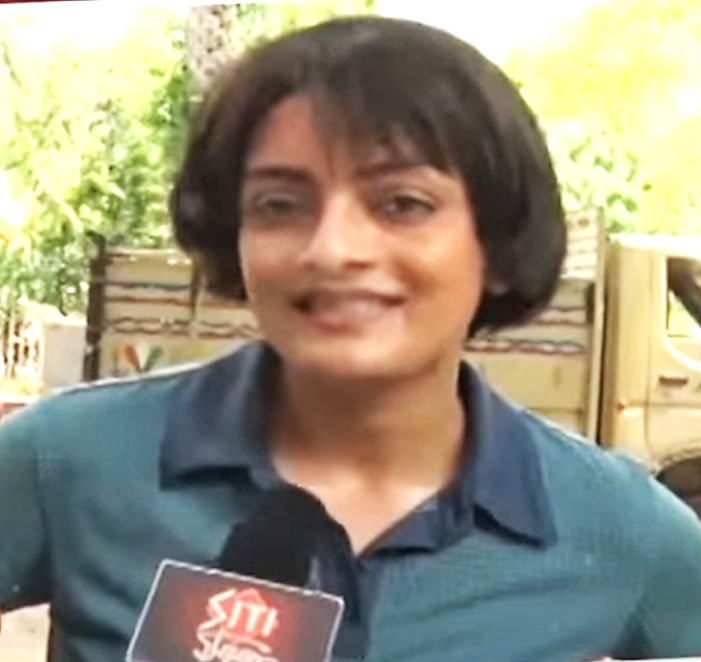
- Born: 17 February 1978 (age 48); Calcutta, West Bengal, India
- Occupations: Actress; Politician
- Years active: 2000–present
- Notable work: Sreemoyee; Satyabati
- Political party: Communist Party of India (Marxist)
- Father: Shyamal Chakraborty

Ushasie Chakraborty (born 17 February 1978) is an Indian actress, politician and academic who works in Bengali language films. She has played the role of Satyabati in Anjan Dutt's film adaptations on Byomkesh Bakshi. She has also played the role of June Guha in the Bengali television show Sreemoyee.

== Personal life ==
Chakraborty is the daughter of veteran Communist Party of India (Marxist) leader Shyamal Chakraborty, who died in August 2020 after contracting COVID-19.

== Education ==
In 2020, Chakraborty submitted her PhD thesis in the midst of personal challenges, including the death of her father. At Jadavpur University, she wrote about bias against female drivers for her MPhil.

== Community service ==
During the COVID-19 lockdown, Chakraborty helped organize and participated in a regular community kitchen for stranded migrant workers.

== Political career ==
In 2011, she campaigned for the CPI(M) before the 2011 West Bengal Legislative Assembly election. In a June 2011 interview, she said she felt her father's political identity is a disadvantage for her in the film industry.

She campaigned for the CPM (M) in the 2024 Indian general election in West Bengal.

== Filmography ==
- Kaler Rakhal (2009)
- Byomkesh Bakshi (2010)
- Ranjana Ami Ar Ashbona (2011)
- Abar Byomkesh (2011)
- Bedroom (2012)
- Jibon Rang Berang (2012)
- Abaar Byomkesh Bakshi-Chitrachor (2012)
- Kangal Malsat (2013)
- Mrs. Sen (2013)
- Teen patti (2014)
- Byomkesh Phire Elo (2014)
- Byomkesh Bakshi (2015)
- Byomkesh O Agniban (2017)
- Shah Jahan Regency (2018)
- Mukhomukhi (2018)
- Kusumitar Gappo (2019)

== Television ==
- Parikshya (Door Darshan Bangla, 2000)
- Neel Seemana (Zee bangla, 2006)
- Rani Kahini (Zee bangla, 2006–2009)
- Ekhane Aakash Neel (Star Jalsha 2008–2009)
- Sreemoyee (Star Jalsha 2019–2021)
- Tumpa Autowali (Colors Bangla 2023 – 2024)
- Tomader Rani (Star Jalsha 2023)
- Roshnai (Star Jalsha 2024 – 2025)

== Web series ==
- Virgin Mohito (2018)
- Chhotolok (2023) on ZEE5

== Awards ==
Year	Award	Category	Name	Character
2021	Star Jalsha Parivar Awards	Sera Khalnayika	Sreemoyee	June
2022	West Bengal Tele Academy Awards	Best Actress (Negative role)	Sreemoyee	June
2022	Telly Awards Bangla	Best Actress in Negative Role	Sreemoyee	June
