= Neel Dutt =

Indian composer

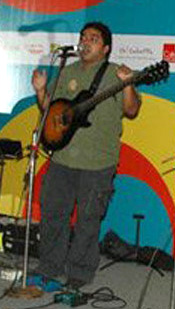

Background information
- Born: 7 March 1979 (age 47); Kolkata, West Bengal, India
- Genres: Urban folk, pop
- Occupations: Composer, singer

Neel Dutt (born 7 March 1979) is an Indian composer and singer from Kolkata. He received the National Film Award for Best Music Direction from the Govt. of India in 2012 for the soundtrack of the Bengali film Ranjana Ami Ar Ashbona (Ranjana I ain't coming back no more). Dutt is the third person from West Bengal to win the Best Music Direction award.

== Early life ==
Neel Dutt was born on 7 March 1979 in Kolkata. His parents are Anjan Dutt and Chanda Dutt. Anjan, an actor and filmmaker, is also a prolific musician from the 1990s scene of modern Bengali music. Chanda is a retired English teacher at St. Augustine's Day School, Kolkata.

As an infant, Dutt's first school was Mr. Pires Private School. Later, he moved to middle school at Seventh Day Adventist School, Kolkata. Following his high school education at St. Augustine's Day School, he studied English literature at Asutosh College, Kolkata. He completed his master's degree in English literature from the University of Calcutta in 2002.

== Early career ==
Dutt was still in middle school when his father started writing songs in Bengali in 1993. That was when he first began to accompany him on the guitar. The two went on to become the first father-son musician duo in modern Bengali music. Playing the guitar professionally with his father from the age of 13 was his first experience in live music as well as studio sessions. From the end of 1993, the duo started performing live and they toured extensively. He received his first Gold Disc from His Master's Voice for their first album, Shuntey Ki chao, which released in 1995.

== Film music ==
While studying for his post graduation, Dutt composed for his first feature film, titled Bow Barracks Forever, a film made in English. He scored and composed the whole soundtrack including the songs. A four-year long delay in the film's release made it the second released feature film with Dutt as the music director. It was showcased in various film festivals all over the world and has been a recipient of awards and accolades.

The feature film that became his first musical release is The Bong Connection, a bilingual film made in English and in Bengali. The soundtrack was the highest selling album in 2007. The film was screened at the Museum of Modern Arts in New York in 2007.

== Musical origins and influences ==
Dutt grew up listening to sixties and seventies British and American musicians. He started playing the guitar at the age of twelve.

In 2007 Dutt joined his friend and vocalist Arko Pravo Mukherjee, guitar player Rajkumar Sengupta and drummer Deboprotim Baksi to form Friends of Fusion (FOF), a contemporary fusion project. They started experimenting with Hindustani classical and folk traditions. The band released its self-titled debut album in 2009 from Saregama; it was considered a failure by fans. FOF toured for three years and released its second album, titled 4/, in 2012. The band split shortly after this.

When Byomkesh Bakshi released in 2010, it brought Dutt's abilities and his fondness for background scoring to the forefront. Dutt received the Etv Sangeet Puroshkar for the Best Background Score in 2013 for the film Dutta Vs Dutta. With the success of subsequent Byomkesh Bakshi films, Abar Byomkesh (2012), Byomkesh Phire Elo (2014) and the revamped Byomkesh Bakshi (2015) starring Jisshu Sengupta, the Byomkesh theme has become quite synonymous to the legendary truth seeker's appearance on the big screen as well as on television.

Dutt's subsequent scoring for Anjan Dutt's Shesh Boley Kichu Nei (2013) and Srijit Mukherjee's Nirbaak (2015) received accolades from critics. In 2014, Neel composed for filmmaker Aparna Sen's experimental Hindi film Saari Raat, and for Sen's next two films, Sonata (2017) and Gharey O Baire (2019). In 2016, Neel rejoined Srijit Mukherjee for his film Uma.

== Film Direction ==
Neel Dutt made his debut as film director in the film Biye Fiye Niye ( All About Weddings). The film portrays the other sides of relationships. The film is written by Neel Dutt and his friends from their own experience. The film was produced by Anjan Dutt. The film was screened in the London Indian Film Festival,Jaffna International Cinema Festival. Biye Fiye Niye was selected and screened under the prestigious New Horizons section of the Indian Panorama in International Film Festival of India(IFFI) in GOA 2025.

== Filmography ==
=== Music composer ===
- Bow Barracks Forever (2004)
- Ek Mutho Chabi (2005)
- The Bong Connection (2006)
- Chalo Let's Go (2008)
- Brake Fail (2009)
- Chowrasta Crossroads of Love (2009)
- Madly Bangalee (2009)
- Cross Connection (2010)
- Byomkesh Bakshi (2010)
- Rong Melanti (2011)
- Jaani Dyakha Hawbe (2011)
- Ranjana Ami Ar Ashbona (2011)
- Abar Byomkesh (2012)
- Dutta Vs Dutta (2012)
- Maach Mishti & More (2013)
- Ammi R Aamar Girlfriends (2013)
- Ganesh Talkies (2013)
- Biye Notout
- Shesh Boley Kichu Nei (2013)
- Khola Hawa (2014)
- Byomkesh Phirey Elo (2014)
- Nirbaak (2015)
- Cross Connection 2 (2015)
- Byomkesh Bakshi (2015)
- Hemanta (2016)
- Byomkesh O Chiriyakhana (2016)
- Saari Raat (2016)
- Sonata (2017)
- Byomkesh O Agnibaan (2017)
- Aami Ashbo Phirey (2018)
- Uma (2018)
- Ahare Mon (2018)
- Shonar Pahar (2018)
- Finally Bhalobasha (2019)
- Ghawre Bairey Aaj (2019)
- Tiki-Taka (2020)

=== Lyricist ===
- The Bong Connection (2005)
