= Bir Hambir (film) =

- Directed by: Shyam Das
- Written by: Kanailal Seal
- Screenplay by: Nitai Bhattacharya
- Based on: Bir Hambir
- Produced by: I.N.A Pictures
- Starring: Manju Dey; Kamal Mitra; Bhanu Bandyopadhyay
- Cinematography: G. K. Mehta
- Edited by: Shyam Das, Shibsadhan Bhattacharya
- Music by: Chitta Ray, Pranab Ray (Lyrics)
- Distributed by: Deluxe Film Distributors
- Release date: 3 June 1955
- Country: India
- Language: Bengali

Bir Hambir is a 1955 Bengali-language Indian film directed by Shyam Das. Its story and screenplay were written by Kanailal Seal & Nitai Bhattacharya. The film's music was composed by Chitta Ray. The film was released on 3 June 1955.

== Cast ==
- Manju Dey
- Arunprakash
- Mitra Biswas
- Ahindra Choudhury
- Kamal Mitra
- Kanu Bandyopadhyay
- Bhanu Bandyopadhyay
- Pahari Sanyal
- Nilima Das
- Nitish Mukhopadhyay
- Utpal Dutt
- Bibhu Bhattacharya
- Santosh Singha

== Music ==
The music for the film Bir Hambir was composed by Chitta Ray. The lyrics were written by Pranab Ray.
