= Pother Kanta =

Detective fiction by Sharadindu Bandyopadhyay

A Thorn on the Path
- Author: Sharadindu Bandyopadhyay
- Original title: Pother Kanta or transliterated as Pather Kanta (পথের কাঁটা)
- Language: Bengali
- Series: Byomkesh Bakshi
- Genre: Detective, Crime, Mystery
- Publisher: P. C. Sorkar and Sons also anthologized by Ananda Publishers
- Publication date: 1932 in hardcover Byomkesher diary and in the Sharadindu Omnibus in 1972
- Publication place: India
- Media type: Print (Hardback & Paperback)
- Pages: 182 pp
- Preceded by: Satyanweshi
- Followed by: Seemanto-heera

Pother Kanta (Bengali: পথের কাঁটা, romanized: Pather Kā̃ṭā, lit. 'A Thorn on the Path'), also spelled Pather Kanta, is a 1932 detective story written by Sharadindu Bandyopadhyay featuring the Bengali detective Byomkesh Bakshi and his friend, assistant, and narrator Ajit Bandyopadhyay. It is one of the first forays that Sharadindu took in the realm of creating a mature logical detective moulded in the pattern of Sherlock Holmes in the Bengali language, and one that Bengalis could immediately identify with. As such, it is not as well-drawn out as some of Sharadindu's later works and relies heavily on Sherlock Holmes and Holmesian deductive reasoning for inspiration.

== Characters ==
- Byomkesh Bakshi
- Ajit Bandyopadhyay
- Punti Ram
- Asutosh Mitra
- Prafulla Roy
- Bilash Mallick
- Young Lady

== Plot summary ==
Ajit and Byomkesh are having a conversation in the living room of their Harrison Road flat. Byomkesh has noticed a rather unusual advertisement hidden away in the classifieds section of the Dainik Kalketu daily with the heading Pother Kanta (Thorn of the Road). Translated the ad reads, "If anyone wants to remove the Thorn of the Road, stand next to and hold on to the lamp-post on the southwest corner of the Whiteway-Ladley store on Saturday evening at 5:30." Byomkesh had noticed this peculiar ad being published without fail every Friday for the previous three months. Byomkesh immediately inferred that the person posting the add went to great pains to remain anonymous and chose this cryptic message on purpose. He also selected a meeting place in the centre of Hogg's Market in Calcutta at a very busy time of the day, so that he could pass by the responder without being detected. Byomkesh guessed that the advertiser would probably want to slip something into the responder's pocket, perhaps some instructions, and would want to accomplish this without being detected. Ajit argued that all of this was circumstantial evidence at best and challenged Byomkesh to prove it, a challenge that Byomkesh heartily accepted.

All this light banter was interrupted by the entrance of a podgy, middle-aged man who introduced himself as Ashutosh Mitra, a single businessman by profession, and a resident of Nebutola. He had come to seek Byomkesh's service with respect to the gramophone pin mystery. Ajit describes the mystery in detail for the benefit of the reader. Basically, metropolitan Calcutta had been plagued recently by the murders of quite a few influential businessmen who had all been killed by being shot with what resembled an Edison gramophone pin embedded in their hearts. All these individuals had been killed in busy areas of Calcutta in broad daylight while crossing the street. There were no witnesses to any of the crimes and no one had reported hearing anything unusual as would be expected from the release of a projectile from a firearm. The police had been frantically trying to nab the murderer or murderers and had even cordoned off and searched all pedestrians and motorists in the area of a crime immediately after an attack, but were unsuccessful in getting any leads. The police had started to arrest anyone who they suspected might have a motive, but still the murders continued. Calcutta was gripped in a spell of panic.

Ashutosh Mitra himself had been the subject of an attack the previous day but his pocket watch which he wore close to his chest had saved him from death. Since he had lost his faith in the police, he approached Byomkesh and pleaded with him to save his life. Byomkesh interrogated him and discovered that he had no children, but a nephew who was an alcoholic currently imprisoned for rowdiness. He did have a living will but he politely refused to state who his successor would be, apart from stating that it was not his cousin. Byomkesh took the broken watch and examined it and came to the conclusion that it was broken beyond repair, that the assailant must have fired from no more than 7-8 yards and that he was most likely alone since it is quite unlikely that more than one person would have developed such an acute sense of accuracy. Byomkesh inquired if Mr. Mitra had heard anything when he was attacked to which he replied that he had not, apart from the usual humdrum of midday traffic. Byomkesh noted that all those attacked had been attacked while crossing the street. He also noted a strange coincidence; all the attacked had been successful businessmen with no children to succeed them.

On spying on Mr. Mitra that afternoon, Byomkesh learned that he had a mistress, quite pretty according to his account, who lived in a separate house. This woman was accomplished as a musician, but relied solely on Mr. Mitra for living expenses. Unknown to Mr. Mitra, she, had a younger, more handsome lover, who, as it turns out, was Mr. Mitra's lawyer.

In the evening it was time for Byomkesh and Ajit to pursue the mysterious Pother kanta advertiser. Ajit was sent out in disguise and Byomkesh followed him but maintained a safe distance. Ajit arrived at the designated spot and waited, but nothing happened. On his way back he was accosted by a beggar who handed him an envelope. As Ajit was looking at its contents, the beggar left the scene. Ajit then took a roundabout way on his way back home. Byomkesh remarked that inside the envelope was the letter he had been expecting but since Ajit had been searching his own pockets incessantly, the advertiser had waited until he left the scene. Inside was a letter with the message that when translated would read, "Who is your Thorn of the road? What is his name and address? Clearly state what you want. Next time we'll meet at midnight. Please come alone to the Khiddirpore Road and walk along it. A man on a bicycle will come and take your written responses from you."

The very next day a devastated Mr. Mitra arrived and told Byomkesh that his mistress had eloped with his lawyer with all the money that the lawyer could get his hands on. After consoling Mr. Mitra, Byomkesh advised him to go home and to not worry about being attacked again since he believed he was safe now. After Mr. Mitra left, Byomkesh told Ajit that he was responsible for warning the lawyer and the law enforcement officials. He mentioned in passing that he believed that the lawyer and the mistress had conspired to get Mr. Mitra killed by responding to the Pather kanta ad. He had expected the lawyer to elope with his lover and the Burdwan police had nabbed then while en route to escaping.

The next morning, a certain Mr. Prafulla Roy arrived at their doorstep. He said he was an insurance agent currently in trouble, and he had responded to the Pather kanta ad. He asked Byomkesh whether or not he should pursue it or call the police. To this, Byomkesh reacted violently and said he never collaborated with the police, and if Mr. Roy wanted the police's help he would get none from Byomkesh.

The meeting between Ajit and the advertiser was set up to proceed. However, both Ajit and Byomkesh had thick porcelain plates fastened to their chests before heading out for the denoted destination. At the mentioned time, while Ajit was on the street, he heard the bell of a passing bicycle coming from the opposite direction and immediately fell to the ground. However, the plate had saved his life.

Byomkesh jumped on the assailant and thus his sting operation was successful in nabbing the culprit who was none other than Prafulla Roy. But before the police arrived, he was successful in committing suicide by eating a poisoned betel leaf. His only regret before dying was that he had not taken Byomkesh more seriously and had thus fallen prey to the trap Byomkesh had set for him. Byomkesh was awarded by the Metropolitan Police and received a cheque for two thousand rupees from Mr. Mitra. However, he did have to relinquish the bicycle bell which had a spring action mechanism for shooting the gramophone pins while masking the noise with the ringing of the bell.

== Adaptations ==
=== Television ===
- This was one of the stories of 1993 TV series Byomkesh Bakshi, that were recreated for broadcasting on Doordarshan, the Indian National Network, by Basu Chatterjee, and immediately went on to become one of the most memorable episodes.
- The story adapted into another TV series in 2014 named Byomkesh, which aired on Bengali channel ETV Bangla.

=== Film ===
- The character Prafulla Roy has a minor role in 2015 Hindi language film Detective Byomkesh Bakshy!.
