= Byomkesh Bakshi (2015 film) =

2015 Indian Bengali film by Anjan Dutt

- Official theatrical poster
- Directed by: Anjan Dutt
- Written by: Anjan Dutt
- Based on: Kohen Kobi Kalidas by Sharadindu Bandyopadhyay
- Produced by: Kaustuv Ray
- Starring: Jisshu Sengupta Saswata Chatterjee
- Edited by: Arghyakamal Mitra
- Music by: Neel Dutt
- Production companies: RP Techvision (I) Pvt. Ltd. Anjan Dutt Production
- Distributed by: Bakliwal Pictures Pvt. Ltd.
- Release date: 16 October 2015
- Running time: 110 Minutes
- Country: India
- Language: Bengali
- Budget: ₹75 lakh (US$80,000)
- Box office: ₹1.3 crore (US$140,000)

Byomkesh Bakshi a Bengali detective thriller film about the Bengali fictional detective Byomkesh Bakshi, released on 16 October 2015. The film is directed by Anjan Dutt. This is the fourth installment of the Byomkesh series by Anjan Dutt. The film is based on Kohen Kobi Kalidas by Sharadindu Bandyopadhyay. Unlike the previous three installments, Jisshu Sengupta portrayed the character Bakshi in this film, replacing Abir Chatterjee.

== Plot synopsis ==
The curtain rises on a small coalfield town. Plagued with a series of unexplained troubles that broke out suddenly, owner of a coalmine seeks the help of Byomkesh Bakshi to sort things out for him. When Byomkesh arrives with his trusted confidante Ajit, they discover to their complete dismay a maze of crimes woven around a violent murder that had little to do with the job that they were entrusted with. A mesmerizing mosaic of criminal characters, a sordid saga of lecherous lust, the thriller unfolds the complex layers of the human mind, so powerfully penned by Sharadindu, now retold by the master movie-maker Anjan Dutt. Byomkesh eventually cracks the case but seals it with his own sense of justice.

== Cast ==
- Jisshu Sengupta as Byomkesh Bakshi
- Saswata Chatterjee as Ajit Bandyopadhyay
- Ushasie Chakraborty as Satyabati (Guest Appearance)
- Kaushik Sen as Gobinda Haldar
- Shantilal Mukherjee as Manish Chakraborty
- Sagnik Chatterjee as Aurobindo Haldar
- Joyjit Banerjee as Phanish Chakraborty
- Prantik Banerjee as Mrigen
- Debdut Ghosh as Madhumoy Sur
- Priyanka Sarkar as Indira (Guest Appearance)
- Ankita Chakraborty as Mohini
- Chandan Sen as Bhuban Das
- Arindol Bagchi as Surapati Ghatak(Guest Appearance)
- Siddhartha Banerjee as Inspector Pramod Barat (Guest Appearance)

== Reception ==
Upon release, the movie received moderately positive reviews from the critics while it was well received by the public.

== Sequel ==
A hint for the next case was given at the end of this movie. The sequel was released on 7 October 2016.

== See also ==
- Byomkesh Bakshi
- Abar Byomkesh
- Byomkesh Phire Elo
