= Manju Dey =

Indian actress and director (1926–1989)

Manju Dey (7 May 1926 – 30 September 1989) was an Indian actress and director in Bengali cinema. She received the award for Best Actress in a Supporting Role at the 25th Annual BFJA Awards for the film Carey Saheber Munshi in 1962.

== Career ==
Dey was born in Baharampur, British India in 1926. She first became popular for her acting in Bengali film Jighansa. She was a leading actress in various black and white films in the early 1950s and 1960s. Dey has worked with directors Ajoy Kar, Mrinal Sen, and Tapan Sinha. She also directed and produced films including Shajarur Kanta and Abhishapta Chambal.

== Filmography ==
- Jighansa (1951)
- Biyallish (1951)
- Ratnadeep (1951)
- Kar Pape (1952)
- Bou Thakuranir Haat (1953)
- Grihapravesh (1954)
- Mantra Shakti (1954)
- Bir Hambir (1955)
- Upahar (1955)
- Laksha-Hira (1956)
- Kabuliwala (1957)
- Prithibi Amare Chaay (1957)
- Bardidi (1957)
- Neel Akasher Neechey (1958)
- Abhishapta Chambal (1967)
- Shajarur Kanta (1974)
- Arpita (1983)
