= Raktomukhi Neela =

Indian detective story

Raktomukhi Neela (Bengali: রক্তমুখী নীলা, romanized: Raktamukhī Nīlā, lit. 'The Bloody Sapphire') is a detective story written by Sharadindu Bandyopadhyay featuring the Bengali detective Byomkesh Bakshi and his friend, assistant, and narrator Ajit Bandyopadhyay and several other story-related characters. It was written in 1937. It was author's 9th work in the Byomkesh Bakshi series.

== Plot ==
On a rainy morning, detectives Byomkesh and Ajit are discussing the dull news in the newspaper when Byomkesh notices an intriguing item — the release of a criminal, Ramanath Neogi, from Alipur Jail ten days earlier. Byomkesh tells Ajit that Ramanath was a dangerous jewel thief who had been arrested ten years ago for stealing a sapphire (Neela) belonging to Maharaj Ramendra Singha, which the Maharaj considered his lucky charm. The Maharaj had offered a reward of Rs. 2,000 for the gem’s return. When Ramanath was arrested, all the stolen jewels were recovered except the sapphire. While he was in jail, the police received information from other prisoners that Ramanath still possessed the gem, but when they searched him, nothing was found.

Byomkesh and Ajit then hear footsteps downstairs. Byomkesh guesses that it might be the Maharaj, coming to ask them to investigate the murder of one of his associates, Haripada Rakshit. When Byomkesh opens the door, his guess proves correct. The Maharaj reveals that Haripada had once been a criminal before becoming his associate. Haripada had promised never to return to crime and had since been a loyal and trustworthy employee. However, a few days earlier, he was found dead in his own home with his throat cut.

After a moment of thoughtful silence, Byomkesh agrees to take the case. He asks the Maharaj if he had noticed anything unusual about Haripada in the days before the murder. The Maharaj replies that one day Haripada seemed unwell after seeing some beggars near his house. He adds that Haripada had asked him whether, if he returned the lost gem, the Maharaj would still give him the Rs. 2,000 reward. After hearing everything, Byomkesh asks the Maharaj to return in the afternoon — he would have solved the case by then.

That afternoon, the Maharaj, Bidhu Babu (the Police Officer-in-Charge of the area), Purno Babu (the Inspector handling the murder case), and Ramanath gather at Byomkesh’s home. Byomkesh explains that Ramanath had kept the gem on his person when he was arrested. When the police came to search him, Ramanath secretly gave the gem to his fellow prisoner Haripada, who hid it in a concealed pocket inside his throat. Unfortunately, Haripada was transferred to another jail the very next day, taking the gem with him. After his release, when Haripada became the Maharaj’s associate, he decided to return the sapphire — but before he could do so, he was murdered by Ramanath.

After recounting the story, Byomkesh begins describing the cursed nature of the Raktomukhi Neela and its ill effects on Ramanath, attempting to unnerve him. He points out that after stealing the gem, Ramanath was arrested, and later, Haripada was murdered while in possession of it. Finally, overcome with fear and anger, Ramanath loses his composure and throws down the gem, which he had been hiding as a button on his coat.

Byomkesh picks up the Raktomukhi Neela and returns it to the Maharaj, thus solving the case.

== In other media ==
=== Radio ===
The story was aired on the Mirchi 93.5 Red FM show, Sunday Suspense, voiced by RJ Mir and RJ Deep.

=== Web series ===
The story was aired in Hoichoi's web series Byomkesh Season 2, Episode 3, starring Anirban Bhattacharya and Ridhima Ghosh.
