= Satyanweshi (novel) =

Bengali detactive novel by Sharadindu Bandyopadhyay

The Truth Seeker
- Author: Sharadindu Bandyopadhyay
- Original title: Satyanweshi or Satyanveshi (সত্যান্বেষী)
- Language: Bengali
- Series: Byomkesh Bakshi
- Genre: Detective, crime, mystery
- Publisher: P.C. Sorkar and Sons, also anthologized by Ananda Publishers
- Publication date: 1934 in hardcover Byomkesher diary and in the Sharadindu Omnibus in 1972
- Publication place: India
- Media type: Print (hardback & paperback)
- Pages: 182 pp
- Preceded by: None
- Followed by: Pother Kanta

Satyanweshi (Bengali: সত্যান্বেষী, romanized: Śatyānneṣī, lit. 'The Truth Seeker') also spelled Satyanveshi, is a detective story written by Sharadindu Bandyopadhyay featuring the Bengali detective Byomkesh Bakshi and his friend, assistant, and narrator Ajit Bandyopadhyay. It is the first Byomkesh adventure written by Sharadindu Bandyopadhyay.

== Plot ==
Ajit Bandyopadhyay lives in a hostel, along with some other people. Ashwini Babu and Ghanshyam Babu are two of the hostel inmates; they live next to Ajit. The hostel is run by a philanthropic homeopathic doctor, Anukul Babu. Ajit has recently become aware of some murders that have happened in their locality. They seemed to have been done by the same person, possibly a serial killer.

One morning, a young man named Atul Chandra Mitra comes to Anukul Babu, looking for a vacant room in the hostel. Anukul Babu informs him that there is no vacant room currently available in the hostel. Ajit was sitting nearby and offered to share his room with Atul. Atul is gratified. He even offers to pay the entire rent which Ajit accepts.

One night, Ashwini Babu is murdered, and Atul gets arrested. But after some time, he is released, without any explanation. That night, the murderer of Ashwini Babu tries to kill Atul and Ajit, but he fails. The real killer gets arrested, who is Anukul Babu. He has been doing the business of cocaine behind homeopathy. Ashwini Babu came upon the secret and thus had to be killed.

After that, it is revealed to Ajit that Atul Chandra Mitra is actually Byomkesh Bakshi who has assumed an alias to know the truth behind the chain of events. Byomkesh takes Ajit to his home, and they begin living together in the former's house with a servant, Punti Ram.

== Characters ==
- Byomkesh Bakshi (Atul Chandra Mitra)
- Ajit Kumar Bandopadhyay
- Punti Ram
- Dr. Anukul Babu
- Ashwini Kumar Chodhury
- Ghanshyam Babu
- Police Commissioner
- Servant
- Inspector

== Adaptations ==
=== Radio ===
- The Sunday Suspense series of 98.3 Radio Mirchi (Kolkata) adapted this novel as a radio drama, voiced by Mir Afsar Ali, RJ Deep and Richard.

=== Television ===
- This was one of the stories of the 1993 TV series Byomkesh Bakshi which were recreated for broadcasting on Doordarshan, the Indian national network, by Basu Chatterjee, and became one of the most memorable episodes.
- The story was adapted into another TV series in 2014, Byomkesh, which aired on Bengali channel ETV Bangla.

=== Film ===
- The 2015 Hindi language film Detective Byomkesh Bakshy! is mainly based on this story.
