= Seemanto-heera =

The Frontier Diamond
- Author: Sharadindu Bandyopadhyay
- Original title: Seemanto-heera, Sheemanto heera, Seemanta heera, or Shimantohira (সীমান্ত হীরা)
- Language: Bengali
- Series: Byomkesh Bakshi
- Genre: Detective, crime, mystery, Novel
- Publisher: P.C. Sorkar and Sons, also anthologized by Ananda Publishers
- Publication date: 1934 in hardcover Byomkesher diary and in the Sharadindu Omnibus in 1972
- Publication place: India
- Media type: Print (hardback & paperback)
- Pages: 182
- Preceded by: Pother Kanta
- Followed by: Makorshar Rosh

Sheemanto heera (Bengali: সীমান্ত হীরা, romanized: Śīmānto Hīrā, lit. 'The Frontier Diamond') is a detective novella written in Bengali by Sharadindu Bandyopadhyay featuring the sleuth Byomkesh Bakshi and Ajit Bandyopadhyay. Written in 1934, it is the third such work of fiction featuring Byomkesh and is written in first-person narrative, as experienced by Byomkesh's friend, associate, and narrator, Ajit Bandyopadhyay.

== Characters ==
- Byomkesh Bakshi
- Ajit Bandyopadhyay
- Punti Ram
- Sir Digindra Narayan
- Kumar Bahadur Tridivendra Narayan Roy
- Ujre Singh

== Synopsis ==
The story revolves around the theft of a priceless heirloom, the Seemanto-heera or "Frontier Diamond", belonging to the heir of the Roy clan, one of the minor rulers of North Bengal. Byomkesh and Ajit have been invited by the current heir, a young Rai Bahadur Tridibendra Narayan Roy to recover the diamond. The diamond had been in the possession of the ruler for generations and a legend had been built around it. According to the legend, if the diamond were to ever be lost, then the line of succession would end. Tridibendran was the sole heir of his line according to the rules of succession where only the eldest son became ruler, but he did have an uncle, Sir Digindra Narayan Roy who was the younger brother of his father. Sir Roy was an established painter and sculptor who worked with mixed media such as plaster of paris. Sir Roy received a lavish monthly pension but since he wasn't heir-apparent, he did not get possession of the diamond. Consumed by greed, he did steal it while the diamond was on display in Calcutta and he replaced it with a fake that looked exactly the same to the untrained eye. He then notified his nephew that he had taken the diamond.

Tridibendra had sought the services of Byomkesh and Ajit to recover the diamond but also requested the utmost secrecy, since he didn't want the press to get wind of this loss. Byomkesh and Ajit returned to Calcutta and checked Sir Roy's house in Ballygunge. The house was very well protected by high walls and a number of guards. Both Ajit and Byomkesh then applied for the post of a secretary to Sir Roy but were detected by the latter and thoroughly humiliated. Not one to lose heart, Byomkesh still boasted that he would find and recover the diamond by the end of the week to which the arrogant Sir Roy took immediate offence. Sir Roy then offered to let him search the house for seven days because he was so confident it wouldn't be discovered. Byomkesh immediately took up the challenge because he realized that this might be the only chance to examine the house and he had already inferred that Sir Roy had hidden it there.

Searching for the diamond turned out to be an arduous task with the work been made even harder by the constant scorn of Sir Roy. Byomkesh could not find anything but he did notice that there were quite a few plaster sculptures including various figurines of Nataraj of different sizes. One was placed on a table in the living room and Byomkesh noticed that Sir Roy stared at the table often though the other items on the table were inconspicuous. Byomkesh asked if he could have the small Nataraj figurine to which Sir Roy said he could, but he also said that this was a priceless work-of-art that had been exhibited at the Louvre and he didn't want Byomkesh to break it because there was nothing hidden inside. Byomkesh took the figurine home but he was disheartened that his major line of enquiry had been busted. Almost casually, he put his initials on the bottom of the figurine. The next day's search seemed to be fruitless as well. When he came home though while staring at the figurine, he noticed that the initials were gone and he immediately came to the conclusion that the figurine had been exchanged while he was away. So he had the diamond in his possession for an entire day without being aware of it!

He returned to Sir Roy's house and used a sleight-of-hand to replace the figurine with his initials with the one it had been replaced by at his home. He returned the figurine to Tridibendra and when they broke the figurine, they found the diamond inside.

== Adaptations ==
=== Television ===
- This was one of the stories of the 1993 TV series Byomkesh Bakshi, that were recreated for broadcasting on Doordarshan, the Indian national network, by Basu Chatterjee, andbecame one of the most memorable episodes.
- The story was adapted into another TV series in 2014, Byomkesh, which aired on Bengali channel ETV Bangla.
