= Sreemoyee =

Indian Bengali television series

- Genre: Drama; Romance; Family drama
- Screenplay by: Leena Gangopadhyay
- Story by: Leena Gangopadhyay
- Directed by: Saibal Banerjee; Diganta Sinha
- Creative director: Leena Gangopadhyay
- Starring: Indrani Haldar; Tota Roy Chowdhury; Sudip Mukherjee; Ushasie Chakraborty; Saptarshi Maulik; Roosha Chatterjee; Aishi Bhattacharya; Arnab Banerjee
- Theme music composer: Debojyoti Mishra
- Opening theme: Sreemoyee by Anweshaa
- Country of origin: India
- Original language: Bengali
- No. of seasons: 1
- No. of episodes: 834

Production
- Executive producers: Debolina Mukhopadhyay; Sumit Kumar Roy (Magic Moments Motion Pictures); Taniya, Supriyo (Star Jalsha)
- Producer: Saibal Banerjee
- Cinematography: Parmatma Yadav
- Editors: Sameer; Soumen
- Camera setup: Multi-camera
- Running time: 22 minutes
- Production company: Magic Moments Motion Pictures

Original release
- Network: Star Jalsha
- Release: 10 June 2019 – 19 December 2021

Related
- Aai Kuthe Kay Karte! Anupamaa

Sreemoyee is an Indian Bengali-language drama telivision series that aired on Star Jalsha from 10 June 2019 to 19 December 2021. Produced by Magic Moments Motion Pictures under Saibal Banerjee and Leena Gangopadhyay, the show starred acclaimed actress Indrani Haldar in the titular role of Sreemoyee Bose Sen.

The story revolves around a devoted homemaker who, after discovering her husband’s infidelity, decides to rebuild her life and establish her own identity. Sreemoyee was praised for portraying women’s empowerment, mid-life transformation, and social issues faced by homemakers. It ran successfully for two-and-a-half years, completing 834 episodes, before concluding in December 2021.

== Plot ==
Sreemoyee is a middle-aged housewife who works extremely hard for her family. Her constant emotional supports are her younger son, Dinka and her brother-in-law, Upal. But upon knowing that her husband, Anindya, is cheating on her by having an affair with his colleague, June, she is initially heart-broken but soon sets out to create a new identity for herself while June starts creating troubles for her. Sreemoyee divorces Anindya while he marries June. She is also supported by her college love, Rohit Sen. The story follows how Sreemoyee tackles the problems caused by June, and becomes a successful businesswoman in ethnic fabric and handicrafts.

== Cast ==
=== Main ===
- Indrani Haldar as Sreemoyee Bose Sen – A businesswoman; (2019–2021)
- Tota Roy Chowdhury as Rohit Sen – A famous NRI businessman; (2020-2021) (dead)
- Sudip Mukherjee as Anindya "Bua" Sengupta – Adityadeb and Patralekha's elder son; (2019–2021)
- Ushasie Chakraborty as June Sengupta – Shombit's ex-wife; (2019–2021)
- Saptarshi Maulik as Pratyush "Dinka" Sengupta – Sreemoyee and Anindya's younger son; (2019–2021)
- Roosha Chatterjee as Arna Chatterjee Sengupta – Animesh and Subhashree's daughter; (2019–2021)

=== Recurring ===
- Aishi Bhattacharya as Dr. Dithi Sengupta Roy – Sreemoyee and Anindya's daughter; (2019–2021)
- Arnab Banerjee as Aitijhyo "Chhotu" Roy – Arojit and Mandira's younger son; (2021)
- Debolina Mukherjee as Dr. Ankita Bose Sengupta – Amitava and Madhubani's daughter; (2019–2021)
- Rohit Samanta as Dr. Aniruddha "Jumbo" Sengupta – Sreemoyee and Anindya's elder son; (2019–2021)
- Ashok Bhattacharya as Anirban Sengupta – Patralekha's husband; (2019-2021)
- Chitra Sen as Patralekha Sengupta – Adityadeb's wife; (2019-2021)
- Anindita Saha Kapileshwari as Anindita "Buni" Sengupta Chakraborty – Adityadeb and Patralekha's daughter; (2019–2021)
- Bharat Kaul as Upal Chakraborty – Anindita's husband; (2019–2021)
- Anindya Chakrabarti as Ronnie Sengupta – Adityadeb and Patralekha's younger son; (2021)
- Poushmita Goswami as Paroma Sengupta – Ronnie's wife; (2021)
- Sohini Banerjee as Sakshi Sengupta – Ronnie and Paroma's daughter (2021)
- Debapratim Dasgupta as Arojit Roy – Mandira's husband; (2021)
- Moyna Mukherjee as Mandira Roy – Arojit's wife; (2021)
- Prity Biswas as Kakoli Roy – Chhotu and Bulbuli's widowed sister-in-law (2021)
- Nishantika Das as Bulbuli Roy – Arojit and Mandira's daughter; (2021)
- Alokananda Roy as Mitali Bose – Sreemoyee and Dipu's mother; (2019)
- Ambarish Bhattacharya as Pradip Bose aka Dipu – Mitali's son; (2019, 2021)
- Samata Das as Roosha Bose – Pradip's wife; (2019)
- Ayush Das as Maharaj Bose – Pradip and Rusha's son; (2019)
- Anushree Das as Antara Bose – Sreemoyee's best friend; (2019–2021)
- Debottam Majumdar as Sankalpo Chatterjee – Arna's late husband; (2019–2020)
- Sandip Chakraborty as Shombit Guha – June's ex-husband; (2019–2021)
- Abhirup Sen as Abhirup Guha aka Bukan – June and Shombit's son (2019–2020)
- Chandan Sen as Amitava Bose – Madhubani's husband; (2019)
- Malabika Sen as Madhubani Bose – Amitava's wife; (2019)
- Kushal Chakraborty as Animesh Chatterjee – Subhashree's husband; (2019–2020)
- Manjusree Ganguly as Subhashree Chatterjee – Animesh's wife; (2019–2020)
- Sharmila Das as Mithu Das – Sengupta family's domestic help; (2019–2021)
- Ashmee Ghosh as Mohua Das aka Mou – Mithu's daughter (2019)
- Madhurima Basak as Kia Sen – An assistant in Dinka's music band; (2020–2021)
- Suman Banerjee as Debalok Dasgupta – a lawyer (2019)
- Debolina Dutta Mukherjee as Swarnachapa Sengupta – a lawyer (2020–2021)
- Sohail Dutta as Sarbajit Ghosh – Prosenjit and Arpita's son; (2020–2021)
- Rajashree Bhowmik as Arpita Sen Ghosh – Rohit's cousin; (2020, 2021)
- Rahul Chakraborty as Prosenjit Ghosh – a lawyer; (2020–2021)
- Joyjit Banerjee as Joyshankar Banerjee – a lawyer (2021)
- Runa Bandopadhyay as Hemlata Sen – Rohit and Arpita's elder aunt (2021)
- Sujoy Prosad Chatterjee as anchor (2020)
- Debnath Chattopadhyay as Police officer – Rohit's close friend (2020-2021)
- Shaktipada Dey as a lawyer (2021)

== Adaptations ==
Language	Title	Original release	Network(s)	Last aired
Kannada	Inthi Nimma Asha ಇಂತಿ ನಿಮ್ಮ ಆಶಾ	7 October 2019	Star Suvarna	8 January 2022
Marathi	Aai Kuthe Kay Karte! आई कुठे काय करते!	23 December 2019	Star Pravah	30 November 2024
Malayalam	Kudumbavilakku കുടുംബവിളക്ക്	27 January 2020	Asianet	3 August 2024
Telugu	Intinti Gruhalakshmi ఇంటింటి గృహలక్ష్మి	3 February 2020	Star Maa	20 January 2024
Hindi	Anupamaa अनुपमा	13 July 2020	StarPlus	Ongoing
Tamil	Baakiyalakshmi பாக்யலட்சுமி	27 July 2020	Star Vijay	8 August 2025
Odia	Shanti ଶାନ୍ତି	6 June 2022	Star Kiran	14 January 2023

== Reception ==
=== Ratings ===
Week	Year	BARC Viewership		Ref.
Week	Year	TRP	Rank	Ref.
Week 40	2020	4.5	5	
Week 43	2020	4.3	5	
Week 44	2020	4.8	5	
Week 47	2020	4.9	5	
Week 49	2020	4.8	5	
Week 6	2021	4.8	4	
