= Shajarur Kanta =

1967 novel by Sharadindu Bandyopadhyay

The Quill of the Porcupine
- Author: Sharadindu Bandyopadhyay
- Original title: Shajarur Kanta
- Language: Bengali
- Series: Byomkesh Bakshi
- Genre: Detective, crime, mystery
- Publisher: P.C. Sorkar and Sons (also anthologized by Ananda Publishers)
- Publication date: 1967 in hardcover Byomkesher diary and in the Sharadindu Omnibus in 1972
- Publication place: India
- Media type: Print (hardback & paperback)
- Pages: 182 pp
- Preceded by: Chholonar Chhondo
- Followed by: Benishanghar

Shajarur Kanta (transl. The Quills of the Porcupine) is a Bengali mystery novel written by Sharadindu Bandyopadhyay in 1967. The murderer kills people using porcupine quills thrust from behind into the heart.

== Plot ==
The story starts with the death of a beggar, found dead with a porcupine's quill embedded to his heart. The police initially dismiss any foul play, but when a few more people end up dead in the same way, police are confused. Byomkesh is asked to investigate when a man is injured grievously, but survives the attack.

The man is Debashish Bhatto, a rich businessman, who has recently married Deepa in an arranged marriage. Byomkesh discovers that everything is not what it seems, especially when the gathering at Nripati Laha's allows him to interact with Debashish's friends and Deepa's family. Deepa's past is intricately entwined with her present, threatening to ruin her and Debashish's life.

== Characters ==
- Byomkesh Bakshi
- Ajit Bandyopadhyay
- Satyabati
- Debashish Bhatto
- Deepa Bhatto, wife of Debashish
- Udaymadhab Mukherjee, grandfather of Deepa and Bijoy
- Neelmadhab Mukherjee, father of Deepa and Bijoy
- Prabal Gupta, lover of Deepa, musician
- Sujan Mitra, an actor
- Nripati Laha
- Bijoy Madhab Mukherjee, brother of Deepa
- Kharag Bahadur, footballer
- Kapil Bose
- Mother of Deepa and Bijoy
- Dr. Sen
- Dr. Gupta

== Adaptations ==
=== Television ===
- This was one of the stories in the 1993 TV series Byomkesh Bakshi, titled "Sahi Ka Kanta".
- The story was adapted into another TV series in 2014, Byomkesh, which aired on the Bengali channel ETV Bangla.

=== Film ===
- A film of the same name was made in 1974.
- Another version of the film was made in 2015 with the same name.

=== Web series ===
- This story was adapted for season 3 of the web series Bomkyesh by Anirban Bhattacharya.

=== Audio story ===
- It has been adapted for Sunday Suspense by Radio Mirchi more than once, with the most recent one being in March, 2026.
