= Byomkesh O Durgo Rahasya =

2023 Indian Bengali film

- First look poster
- Directed by: Birsa Dasgupta
- Screenplay by: Subhendu Dasmunshi
- Based on: Durgo Rahasya by Sharadindu Bandyopadhyay
- Produced by: Dev; Shyam Sundar Dey; Tanmoy Banerjee
- Starring: Dev; Rukmini Maitra; Ambarish Bhattacharya
- Cinematography: Subhankar Bhar
- Edited by: Sumit Chowdhury
- Music by: Diptarka Bose
- Production companies: Shadow Films; Dev Entertainment Ventures
- Distributed by: PVR Inox Pictures
- Release date: 11 August 2023
- Running time: 119:50 minutes
- Country: India
- Language: Bengali

Byomkesh O Durgo Rahasya (transl. Byomkesh and the Mystery of the Fort) is a 2023 Indian Bengali-language detective thriller film directed by Birsa Dasgupta and written by Subhendu Dasmunshi. The film stars Dev as Byomkesh Bakshi along with Rukmini Maitra, Ambarish Bhattacharya, Rajatava Dutta, Satyam Bhattacharya and Debesh Chattopadhyay in pivotal roles. It is produced by Dev under Dev Entertainment Ventures. The film is based on the Bengali fictional detective character of Byomkesh Bakshi. The film was released theatrically on 11 August 2023.

== Cast ==
- Dev as Byomkesh Bakshi
- Rukmini Maitra as Satyabati, Byomkesh's wife
- Ambarish Bhattacharya as Ajit
- Satyam Bhattacharya as Monilal
- Shantilal Mukherjee as Officer DSP Pandey
- Rajatava Dutta as Ram Kishore Singha
- Debesh Chattopadhyay
- Shankar Debnath
- Atmadeep Ghosh
- Sayantan Maitra as Murlidhar
- Sampurna Mandal
- Rohit Basfore

== Production ==
=== Development ===
The film was announced on 28 January 2023 by Dev on his Twitter handle, marking the completion of his 17 years in the Bengali Film Industry. On the auspicious occasion of Poila Baisakh the first look of Dev as Byomkesh Bakshi from the film was released. The dubbing was completed on 3 July 2023.

=== Filming ===
Principal photography took place from April 2023 to June 2023 across Madhya Pradesh, Bolpur and Jharkhand.

=== Marketing ===
The trailer was released on 27 July 2023 on Dev Entertainment Ventures Youtube channel. The teaser and pre teaser of the film were released on 14 July 2023 and 1 July 2023 respectively on the same channel. PVR Pictures announced that the film would get an all India release on 11 August 2023.

== Soundtrack ==
Byomkesh O Durgo Rahasya

Soundtrack album by Diptarka Bose
- Released: 19 August 2023
- Recorded: 2022–23
- Genre: Feature film soundtrack
- Length: 15:11
- Language: Bengali
- Label: Dev Entertainment Ventures
- Producer: Dev

Official audio
- Byomkesh O Durgo Rahasya - Full Album on YouTube

The music of the film was composed by Diptarka Bose.

The first single "Bom Satyaneshi", penned by Arghyaneal Ghosh was released on 31 July 2023. The second single "O Je Mane Na Mana" was released on 7 August 2023. It is an adaptation of a Rabindra Sangeet by Rabindranath Tagore.

Track listing
| No. | Title | Singer(s) | Length |
|---|---|---|---|
| 1. | "Bom Satyaneshi" | Diptarka Bose | 2:54 |
| 2. | "O Je Mane Na Mana" | Lagnajita Chakraborty | 1:28 |
| 3. | "Byomkesh Investigation Theme" | | 1:49 |
| 4. | "Adventure Theme" | | 2:01 |
| 5. | "Gold Theme" | | 2:50 |
| 6. | "Reveal Theme" | | 4:09 |
| Total length: | | | 15:11 |

== Release ==
The film was released on 11 August 2023 on the occasion of the Independence Day. It was released with 190+ shows in the first week in West Bengal.

== Reception ==
=== Box office ===
The film earned more than 1.5 crore rupees within the first five days of release. The total worldwide collection after 1 week stands at 2.30 crores.

=== Critical reception ===
The film opened to positive responses from the audience and mixed reviews from the critics. Subhasmita Kanji of Hindustan Times Bengali rated the film 3.8 out of 5 stars and wrote "If I say overall, then I will say good. Actually could have been better as expected, the scope was there." Souvik Saha of Cine Kolkata rated the film 3 out of 5 stars and wrote "The film offers a unique take on the iconic detective, combining elements of commercial cinema with the intrigue of a mystery thriller. While it has its share of flaws, the film's visual aesthetics make it worth a watch for fans of the genre."

Virat Verma of Flickonclick rated the film 4 out of 5 stars and wrote "It combines well-executed performances, intriguing storytelling, and an atmospheric setting to create an engaging cinematic experience....The movie succeeds in delivering a thrilling narrative that keeps audiences engrossed till the very end." Devarti Ghosh of Ei Samay rated the film 3 out of 5 stars and wrote "Mystery, Love, Relationships, History, Comedy, One can watch Dev's Byomkesh to find entertainment in the mix of action." Aaj Tak Bengali rated the film 3.5 out of 5 stars.

Upam Buzarbaruah of Times of India rated the film 3 out of 5 stars and wrote "Byomkesh O Durgo Rohosyo is a thriller – an unremarkable package that has a bit of everything. It has all that calls for a watch."
