= Chitrachor =

1951 Bengali detective novella by Sharadindu Bandyopadhyay

- Author: Sharadindu Bandyopadhyay
- Original title: চিত্রচোর
- Language: Bengali
- Series: Byomkesh Bakshi
- Genre: Detective, crime, mystery
- Publication date: 1951
- Publication place: India
- Media type: Print (hardback & paperback)
- Preceded by: Byomkesh o Boroda
- Followed by: Durgo Rahasya

Chitrachor (Bengali: চিত্রচোর), meaning "The Picture Thief", is a detective novella by Bengali author Sharadindu Bandyopadhyay. First published in 1951, it is one of the stories featuring the sleuth Byomkesh Bakshi, who is often referred to as Satyanweshi or the truth-seeker.

== Plot summary ==
Recovering from an illness, Byomkesh Bakshi travels to the Santhal Parganas in Bihar (now in Jharkhand) for a change of air, accompanied by his wife, Satyabati, and his friend and chronicler, Ajit Bandyopadhyay. They rent the upper floor of a house owned by Professor Adinath Shome. During their stay, they become acquainted with several locals, including the wealthy Mahidhar Chowdhury and his daughter Rajani.

A series of mysterious events begins when a group photograph taken during a recent picnic goes missing from Mahidhar's house. Similar incidents of missing photographs are reported by others who were part of the group. Concurrently, a talented but impoverished artist named Phalguni Pal starts approaching the same individuals with portraits he claims to have drawn from memory.

As Byomkesh delves deeper, he notices unusual behaviors among the locals. Relationships become strained, and hidden tensions surface. The disappearance of the photographs seems connected to secrets that someone wants to keep hidden. Byomkesh must untangle a web of deceit, uncovering motives rooted in personal desires and societal pressures.

Through keen observation and logical deduction, Byomkesh works to solve the mystery without revealing sensitive personal matters of those involved.

== Characters ==
- Byomkesh Bakshi: the protagonist, a sharp and intuitive detective known for his logical reasoning and observational skills
- Ajit Bandyopadhyay: Byomkesh's close friend and the narrator of the story
- Satyabati: Byomkesh's wife, who accompanies him on the trip
- Mahidhar Chowdhury: a wealthy local resident who hosts a tea party where the initial mystery unfolds
- Rajani: Mahidhar's daughter, whose personal life becomes central to the unfolding events
- Professor Adinath Shome: the landlord where Byomkesh, Satyabati, and Ajit are staying
- Malati Devi: Professor Shome's wife, whose interactions add complexity to the narrative
- Phalguni Pal: a gifted artist whose death becomes the catalyst for the investigation
- Dr. Ashwini Ghatak: a local doctor who becomes one of the suspects
- Purandar Pandey: the local Deputy Superintendent of Police (DSP), who assists in the investigation
- Nakulesh Sarkar: a photographer who had taken the group photograph
- Ushanath Ghosh: a deputy and one of the individuals whose photograph goes missing
- Amaresh Raha - The antagonist,Bank manager

== Adaptations ==
Chitrachor has been adapted into various formats:

- Television: It was featured in the popular Indian television series Byomkesh Bakshi (1993–1997), directed by Basu Chatterjee, with actor Rajit Kapur portraying Byomkesh. The episode titled "Tasveer Chor" is based on this story.
- Radio and theatre: The story has also been adapted into radio plays and stage performances, bringing it to a wider audience beyond Bengali readers.

== Publication ==
The novella has been published in various editions and is included in compilations of Byomkesh Bakshi stories. It is available in both hardcover and paperback formats, and has been translated into multiple languages.

== See also ==
- Bengali literature
- Detective fiction
