= Chandan Sen =

Indian actor

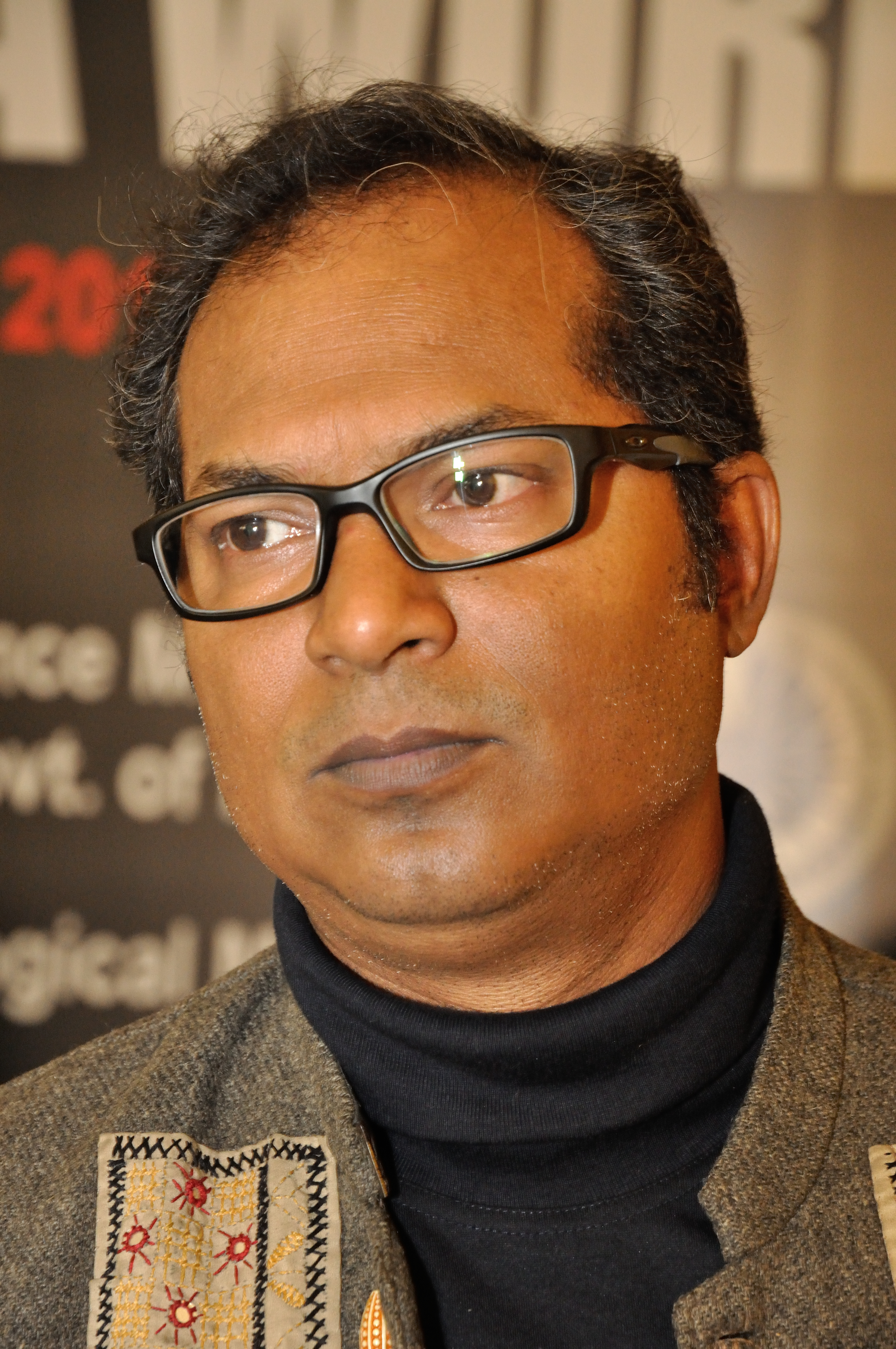
- Chandan Sen in Kolkata, 2013.
- Born: 26 February 1963 (age 63); Kolkata, India
- Occupation: Actor

Chandan Sen is an Indian Bengali-language stage, television and film actor, playwright and director.

== Career ==
He started acting in Bengali theatre in 1977, later joined Natya Anan theatre group as a creative director and an actor in 1997. Since then, he has acted in number of Bengali films. He was a regular face in Star Jalsha's daily soap Ichche nodee. He is also a supporter of the Communist Party of India (Marxist).

== Works ==
=== Television ===
Year	Serial	Character	Channel	Production House
2005–2006	Neel Simana		Zee Bangla	Black Magic Production
2011– 2015	Ishti Kutum	Satyakam Hembram	Star Jalsha	Magic Moments Motion Pictures
2012– 2014	Aanchol	Kailash	Star Jalsha	Blues Productions
2014– 2015	Byomkesh	Debkumar Sarkar	ETV Bangla	Daag Creative Media
2015– 2017	Ichche Nodee	Chandan Sen	Star Jalsha	Magic Moments Motion Pictures
2016	Kusum Dola	Jayanta Mukherjee	Star Jalsha	Magic Moments Motion Pictures
2017– 2018	Andarmahal	Amitava Basu	Zee Bangla	Magic Moments Motion Pictures
2017– 2018	Sanyashi Raja	Shakko Sen	Star Jalsha	Magic Moments Motion Pictures
2018– 2019	Mayurpankhi	Sameer Bose	Star Jalsha	Magic Moments Motion Pictures
2019– 2020	Netaji	Dwijendralal Ray	Zee Bangla	Surinder Films
2019	Sreemoyee	Amitava Sen	Star Jalsha	Magic Moments Motion Pictures
2019	Kone Bou		Sun Bangla	Blues Productions
2020– 2022	Khorkuto	Trilokeshwar Mukherjee	Star Jalsha	Magic Moments Motion Pictures
2021–present	Teen Shaktir Adhar – Trishul		Colors Bangla	Blues Productions
2022	Guddi	Bohoru Sarkar	Star Jalsha	Magic Moments Motion Pictures
2022– 2023	Ekka Dokka	Kushal Majumder	Star Jalsha	Magic Moments Motion Pictures
2023	Balijhor		Star Jalsha	Magic Moments Motion Pictures
2023– 2024	Jol Thoi Thoi Bhalobasha	Uddalayak Basu, Kojagori's husband	Star Jalsha	Magic Moments Motion Pictures
2025–2026	Chirosokha	Sarbajit Bose	Star Jalsha	Magic Moments Motion Pictures
2025–2026	Bhole Baba Par Karega	Nilanjan Chatterjee	Star Jalsha	Magic Moments Motion Pictures

=== Films ===
- Keu Bole Biplobi Keu Bole Dakat (2026)
- Haloom (2024)
- Tirandaj Shabor (2022)
- Manikbabur Megh (2021)
- Syndicate (2021)
- Bumper (short film) (2020)
- Kidnap (2019)
- Maati (2018)
- Happy Pill (2018)
- Byomkesh Bakshi (2015)
- The Royal Bengal Tiger (2014)
- Byomkesh Phire Elo (2014)
- Taan (2014)
- Abar Byomkesh (2012)
- Chora Bali (2012)
- Hatey Roilo Pistol (2011)
- Byomkesh Bakshi (2010)
- Tara (2010)
- Madly Bangali (2009)
- Phera (2008)
- Refugee (2006)
- Herbert (2006)
- Abar Asbo Phire (2004)
- Bow Barracks Forever (2004)
- Mr. and Mrs. Iyer (2002)
- Bariwali (2000)

== Awards and nominations ==
He won the Best Actor Award at the Pacific Meridian Film Festival in Russia and NORGS International Independent Festival from Iran for his performance in the 2021 film 'The Cloud and the Man' (Manikbabur Megh) directed by Abhinandan Banerjee.

- 2025 - Filmfare Awards Bangla 2025 – Best Actor (Critics') for Manikbabur Megh (Shared with Anjan Dutt for Chalchitra Akhon)
