= Byomkesh (2017 TV series) =

Indian Bengali thriller web-series

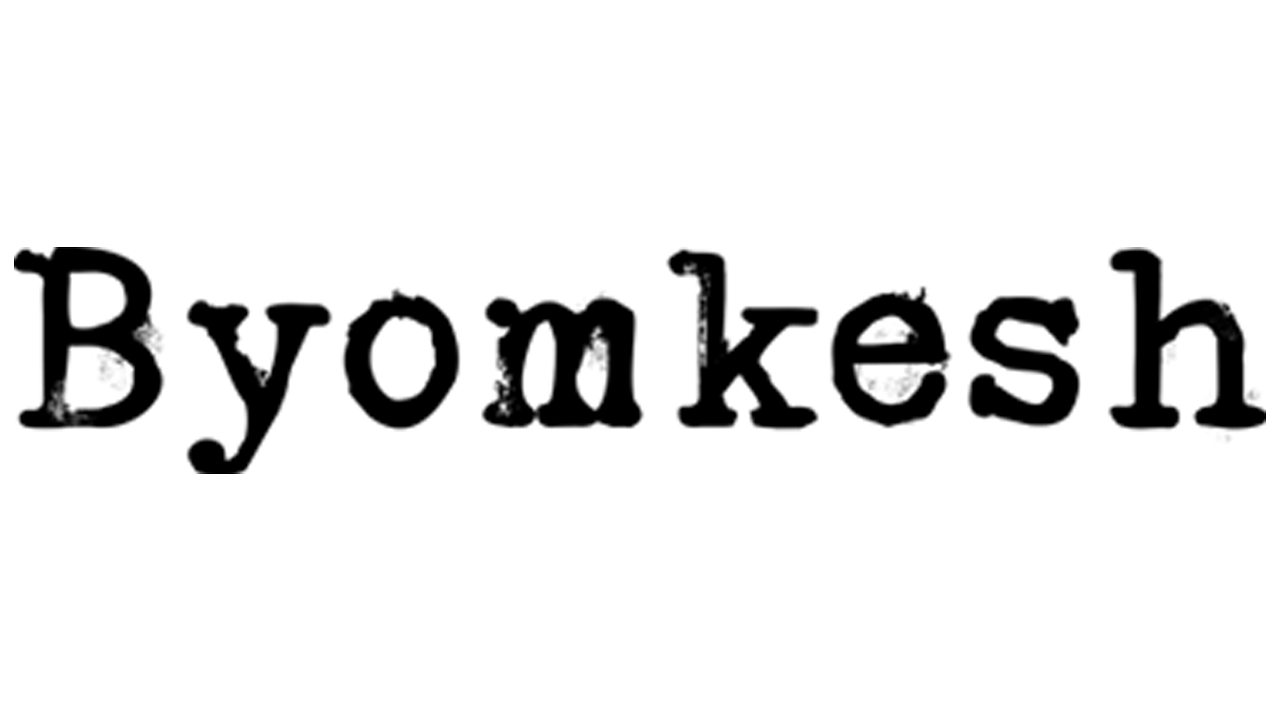
- Byomkesh- logo
- Genre: Detective; Thriller
- Based on: Byomkesh Bakshi by Sharadindu Bandyopadhyay
- Directed by: Sayantan Ghosal; Soumik Chattopadhyay; Soumik Haldar; Sudipto Roy
- Starring: Anirban Bhattacharya; Subrat Dutta; Suprobhat Das; Bhaswar Chatterjee; Riddhima Ghosh
- Country of origin: India
- Original languages: Bengali; Hindi
- No. of seasons: 8
- No. of episodes: 20

Production
- Production company: SVF

Original release
- Release: 14 October 2017 – present

Byomkesh is a Bengali streaming television series based on the Byomkesh Bakshi character created by Sharadindu Bandyopadhyay. Set in the 1930s, the series is based on the adventures of Byomkesh, and his friend and biographer Ajit, who usually accompanies Bakshi during his investigations. Anirban Bhattacharya portrays the lead role of Byomkesh, with Subrat Dutta in the role of Byomkesh's trusted friend-turned-aide, Ajit. The first episode premiered on Saturday, 14 October 2017, being the first Byomkesh series to be available on OTT platform hoichoi worldwide.

== Cast ==
- Anirban Bhattacharya as Byomkesh Bakshi
- Subrat Dutta as Ajit Kumar Banerjee (Season 1 to Season 3)
- Suprobhat Das as Ajit Kumar Banerjee (Season 4 to Season 7)
- Bhaswar Chattopadhyay as Ajit Kumar Banerjee (Since Season 8)
- Ridhima Ghosh as Satyabati, Byomkesh's wife
- Tarun Chakraborty as Inspector Bidhu Bhattacharya
- Arjun Chakraborty as Himangsu Chowdhury
- Aryann Bhowmik as Satyakam Das
- Saptarshi Roy as Ushapati Das
- Tulika Basu as Suchitra Das
- Abanti Mohan Banerjee as Ramakanta Chowdhury
- Rupsha Chatterjee as Annapurna
- Oindrila Saha as Chumki
- Ratan Sarkhel as Dhananjay Mondal
- Gopal Talukder as Nanda Ghosh
- Bhaskar Banerjee as Nripati Laha
- Monu Mukherjee as Nandadulal Babu
- Indrasish Roy as Abhay Ghoshal
- Mrinal Mukherjee as Maharaj Ramendra Singh
- Arindol Bagchi as Haripada
- Biswajit Sarkar as Ramanath Neogi
- Parthasarathi Deb as Ashutosh Deb
- Koushik Kar as Prafulla Ray
- Debranjan Nag as Anukul Babu
- Dulal Lahiri as Korali Babu
- Fahim Mirza as Sukumar, Satyabati's elder brother
- Sourav Chatterjee as Fanibhushan
- Amrita Chattopadhyay as Deepa Bhatta
- Raja Goswami as Debasish Bhatta
- Tamal Roy Chowdhury as Deepa's Grandfather
- Joyjit Banerjee as Prabal Gupta
- Debdut Ghosh as Dr. Rudra
- Janardan Ghosh as Debkumar Mitra,a scientist
- Nandini Chatterjee as Subhra Mitra, Debkumar's wife
- Gambhira Bhattacharya as Habul
- Priyanka Bhattacharjee as Rekha
- Arun Bannerjee as Rameshwar Roy
- Soumya Sengupta as Dr. Asim Sen
- Raajhorshee Dey as Bishu Pal
- Soumyabrata Rakshit as Dr.Suresh Rakshit
- Debshankar Haldar as Santosh Samaddar
- Soumendra Bhattacharya as Uday Samaddar
- Sawon Chakraborty as Jugal Samaddar
- Krishnendu Dewanji as Ravi Verma
- Darshana Banik as Hena Mallick
- Rukma Roy as Sukumari
- Ujaan Chatterjee as Nengti
- Arunima Haldar as Chingri
- Indrajit Mazumder as Inspector Atul Krishna Ray aka A K Ray
- Ushasi Ray as Iman Devi
- Chandan Sen as Kaligoti Upadhyay

== Season 1 ==
Season 1 of the Byomkesh is based on four stories, 'Satyaneshi', 'Pather Kanta, 'Artham Anartham' and 'Makorshar Rosh' written by Bengali author Sharadindu Bandyopadhyay. The season was released on 14 October 2017 with two episodes, this season was directed by Sayantan Ghoshal and the second series was released on 16 December 2017.

=== Episodes ===
No.	Title	Directed by	Original release date
1	"Satyanweshi Pother Kanta"	Sayantan Ghosal	14 October 2017
2	"Makorshar Rosh Arthamanartham"	Sayantan Ghosal	14 October 2017

== Season 2 ==
In Season 2, Byomkesh will solve the mystery of Satyakam's murder. This series is based on 'Raketr Dag' another best seller in the Byomkesh. The first episode of the Season 2 was launched on 16 December 2017, later on, two other episodes are also being released by hoichoi. First two episodes were directed by Soumik Chattopadhyay, and the third episode was directed by Sayantan Ghoshal.

=== Episodes ===
No.	Title	Directed by	Original release date
1	"Rakter Daag Part 1"	Soumik Chattopadhyay	25 December 2017
2	"Rakter Daag Part 2"	Soumik Chattopadhyay	25 December 2017
3	"Raktamukhi Neela"	Sayantan Ghosal	25 December 2017

== Season 3 ==
Season 3 of the Byomkesh is based on the story Shajaru’r Kanta written by author Sharadindu Bandopadhyay. In this season Byomkesh investigates a series of murders that were committed by someone using a sharpened porcupine quill.

=== Episodes ===
No.	Title	Directed by	Original release date
1	"Shajaru'r Kanta - Part 1"	Sayantan Ghosal	14 April 2018
2	"Shajaru'r Kanta - Part 2"	Sayantan Ghosal	14 April 2018

== Season 4 ==
Byomkesh season 4 is based on Bengali author Sharadindu Bandopadhyay's ‘Agnibaan’. The story starts with a young girl Rekha, Byomkesh's neighbor, who dies under some mysterious circumstances in her kitchen. Byomkesh takes charge of this investigation and from here the investigation of Byomkesh begun.

=== Episodes ===
No.	Title	Directed by	Original release date
1	"Agnibaan Part 1"	Soumik Chattopadhyay	12 April 2019
2	"Agnibaan Part 2"	Soumik Chattopadhyay	12 April 2019

== Season 5 ==
Byomkesh season 5 started streaming from 10 January 2020. The season is directed by Soumik Halder based on Sharadindu Bandyopadhyay's original story 'Dushtochakra' and 'Khnuji Khnuji Nari'. All the cast remains the same except this time Suprobhat Das plays the role of Ajit.

=== Episodes ===
No.	Title	Directed by	Original release date
1	"Tetallisher Monnontor"	Soumik Halder	10 January 2020
2	"Khnuji Khnuji Nari"	Soumik Halder	10 January 2020

== Season 6 ==
Byomkesh season 6 started streaming from 8 January 2021. The season is directed by Soumik Halder based on Sharadindu Bandyopadhyay's original story 'Mogno Mainak'.

=== Episodes ===
No.	Title	Directed by	Original release date
1	"Hena-Monyota"	Soumik Halder	8 January 2021
2	"Rohoshyomoy Mouth Organ"	Soumik Halder	8 January 2021
3	"Deshbhager Khesharawd"	Soumik Halder	8 January 2021

== Season 7 ==
Byomkesh season 7 released on 4 November 2021 at Diwali eve. The season is directed by Soumik Halder based on Sharadindu Bandyopadhyay's original story 'Chorabali'.

=== Episodes ===
No.	Title	Directed by	Original release date
1	"Chorabali"	Soumik Halder	4 November 2021
2	"Shobdobhed"	Soumik Halder	4 November 2021

== Season 8 ==
On 7 April 2023, Hoichoi released the eighth season of Byomkesh, titled Byomkesh O Pinjrapol. It is based on Chiriyakhana. This time, Bhattacharya became the creative director of the show. Pratik Dutta wrote the adapted screenplay and dialogues. It is directed by Sudipto Roy.

=== Episodes ===
No.	Title	Directed by	Original release date
1	"Prothom Pawrbo"	Sudipto Roy	7 April 2023
2	"Dwitiyo Pawrbo"	Sudipto Roy	7 April 2023
3	"Tritriyo Pawrbo"	Sudipto Roy	7 April 2023
4	"Choturtho Pawrbo"	Sudipto Roy	7 April 2023
