= Byomkesh Phire Elo =

2014 film by Anjan Dutt

- Official theatrical poster
- Directed by: Anjan Dutt
- Screenplay by: Anjan Dutt
- Based on: Beni Sanghar by Sharadindu Bandyopadhyay
- Produced by: Kaustuv Ray
- Starring: Abir Chatterjee; Saswata Chatterjee; Ushasie Chakraborty
- Cinematography: Indranil Mukherjee
- Edited by: Arghyakamal Mitra
- Music by: Neel Dutt
- Production companies: RP Techvision (I) Pvt. Ltd. Anjan Dutt Production
- Distributed by: Bakliwal Pictures Pvt. Ltd.
- Release date: 19 December 2014
- Running time: 1 hour 47 minutes
- Country: India
- Language: Bengali
- Budget: ₹70 lakh (US$83,000)
- Box office: ₹1.88 crore (US$220,000)

Byomkesh Phire Elo is a 2014 Indian mystery thriller film based on the Bengali fictional detective Byomkesh Bakshi, released on 19 December 2014. The film is directed by Anjan Dutt. This is the third installment of Byomkesh series by Anjan Dutt, serving as a sequel to Byomkesh Bakshi and Abar Byomkesh. The film is based on Beni Sanghar by Sharadindu Bandyopadhyay.

== Plot ==
Benimadhab (Biswajit Chakraborty), a rich businessman is under the impression that someone is trying to kill him, but is not able to find out who. He appoints Byomkesh (Abir Chatterjee) to find out. While Byomkesh starts investigating (with his sidekick Ajit (Saswata Chatterjee) narrating the events), Benimadhab is murdered. The inquest into this gruesome act reveals some dark secrets of Benimadhab's family members.

== Cast ==
- Abir Chatterjee as Byomkesh Bakshi
- Saswata Chatterjee as Ajit
- Ushasie Chakraborty as Satyabati
- Biswajit Chakraborty as Benimadhab
- Chandan Sen as Ajay, Benimadhab's son
- Locket Chatterjee as Arati, Benimadhab's daughter-in-law
- Kaushik Sen as Gangadhar, Benimadhab's son-in-law
- Anjana Basu as Gayetri, Benimadhab's daughter
- Ankita Chakraborty as Medini, wife of Meghraj, the bodyguard of Benimadhab
- Sampurna Lahiri as Laboni, Ajay and Arati's daughter
- Rahul Banerjee as Sanat, Benimadhab's distant nephew
- Ena Saha as Jhilli, Gangadhar and Gayetri's daughter
- Subhra Sourav Das as Mokorondo, Ajay and Arati's son

== Sequel ==
The next installment of this series starring Jisshu Sengupta as Byomkesh Bakshi was released the following year on 16 October. It is based on Kohen Kobi Kalidas by Sharadindu Bandyopadhyay and titled as Byomkesh Bakshi once again.

== See also ==
- Byomkesh Bakshi
- Abar Byomkesh
