= DD Bangla =

Indian Bengali-language television channel

Doordarshan Bangla
- Logo used since 2019
- Country: India
- Broadcast area: West Bengal (terrestrial); Nationwide (satellite and cable)
- Network: Doordarshan
- Headquarters: Kolkata, West Bengal, India

Programming
- Languages: Bengali (main); Hindi (secondary); Nepali (secondary); Santali (secondary); Urdu (secondary)
- Picture format: 1080i HDTV

Ownership
- Owner: Prasar Bharati
- Key people: Sudip Chaudhury

History
- Launched: 9 August 1975; 51 years ago (Doordarshan Kendra Kolkata); 20 August 1992; 34 years ago (DD Bangla)
- Former names: Doordarshan Kendra Calcutta (1975–1992)

Links
- Website: Official Website

DD Bangla, also known as DD7, is an Indian Bengali-language free-to-air state-owned television network owned by state-owned broadcaster Doordarshan, established on 20 August 1992. It is the successor of Doordarshan Kendra Kolkata, established on 9 August 1975. It broadcasts from Kolkata, Shantiniketan and Jalpaiguri, and is headquartered in Television Centre in Golf Green, Kolkata.

== History ==
Doordarshan established its first television station in East India in Calcutta on 9 August 1975, on channel 4 in the VHF band. The first known broadcast was of a female presenter, Sharmistha Dasgupta greeting viewers with the statement, "Nomoshkar. Today, begins the journey of television in Kolkata." This was said in Bengali. By this year, besides Calcutta, television services were available in Delhi, Bombay, Amritsar, Lucknow, Madras, and Srinagar. It was originally supposed to go operational in 1973-74.

Doordarshan Kendra Calcutta was the third Bengali-language television station to be established in the world, after the Bangladesh Television stations established in Dhaka and Natore in 1964 and 1974 respectively, as well as the first in India. The station initially broadcast from the Akashvani Bhavan in Calcutta. Its headquarters were later moved to the Radha Film Studio in Tollygunge. It was later moved again to a new headquarter building called Television Centre, in the Golf Green neighbourhood on 1 July 1986.

Colour broadcasts commenced on 6 June 1983. On 30 October 1987, Doordarshan Calcutta broadcast a documentary on Bengali poet Sukumar Ray, produced by his son Satyajit Ray, as well as the state government of West Bengal. The station also began broadcasting during morning hours on 4 September 1988. Doordarshan Calcutta was rebranded as DD Bangla on 20 August 1992. The Regional Language Satellite Service was also introduced on that day, enabling DD Bangla to be broadcast on cable and satellite television.

Television stations were established in Shantiniketan on 8 September 1996, and Jalpaiguri on 24 September 1998. After digitalizing its studios in 2001, Doordarshan Kendra Kolkata began broadcasting on digital terrestrial television in January 2003. Digital satellite uplinking was commenced in April 2004. Broadcasts in high-definition began on 15 April 2013. In December 2025, DD Bangla invited content proposals from independent producers to be broadcast on the network as part of Prasar Bharati's Sponsored Programme Scheme.

== Programming ==
The programming of DD Bangla consists of soap operas, infotainment series, news and current affairs, social programs and films. It mainly broadcasts programming in Bengali, as well as in Hindi, Nepali, Santali, and Urdu. Programs broadcast by the channel include Bibaho Obhijan, Camera Cholche, Rongo Tamaasha, Eto Sur Ar Eto Gaan, Madhyamik classes among others.

== See also ==
- DD Free Dish
- List of programs broadcast by DD National
- All India Radio
- List of South Asian television channels by country
