= Abar Byomkesh =

2012 Bengali-language film by Anjan Dutt

- Film poster
- Directed by: Anjan Dutt
- Screenplay by: Anjan Dutt
- Based on: Chitrochor by Sharadindu Bandyopadhyay
- Produced by: Rana Sarkar
- Cinematography: Indranil Mukherjee
- Edited by: Arghyakamal Mitra
- Music by: Neel Dutt
- Production company: Dag Creative Media
- Release date: 23 March 2012
- Running time: 102 minutes
- Country: India
- Language: Bengali

Abar Byomkesh ('Byomkesh Once Again') is an Indian detective film about the Bengali fictional detective Byomkesh Bakshi released on 23 March 2012. It is directed by Anjan Dutt and is the sequel of 2010's Byomkesh Bakshi. Dutt made a sequel of Abar Byomkesh, named Byomkesh Phire Elo released on 19 December 2014.

== Story ==
Byomkesh had fallen critically ill and is being nursed back to health by his wife, Satyabati (Ushashie Chakraborty), and dear friend, Ajit (Saswata Chatterjee). On medical advice, Byomkesh goes to Dooars to recuperate with his two caring companions. He takes a decided turn for the better with the change in climate, much to the relief of Satyabati and Ajit.

But, as fate would have it, mystery arrives. At Dooars, Byomkesh meets Bengali inhabitants from the local community like Dr. Ashwini Ghatak (Sujan Mukherjee), Prof. Adinath Shome (Pijush Ganguly), Mahidhar Chaudhury (Biswajit Chakrabarty), photographer Nakulesh Sarkar (Arindol Bagchi), police officer Purander Pandey (Kunal Padhy), deputy magistrate Umanath Ghosh (Chandan Sen) and banker Amaresh Raha (Kaushik Sen). They have a get-together at the residence of Mahidhar Chaudhary, where everybody is regaled by the singing of Mahidhar's young daughter Rajani (Swastika Mukherjee).

The flow of the party is somewhat interrupted by the sudden arrival of Falguni Pal, a poor artist, who has the rare talent of painting anyone's portrait after seeing his subject for only a few minutes. In passing, Mahidhar reports that a robbery had taken place at his house a couple of days back. The thief, however, had ignored all of Mahidhar's riches and stolen only a group photograph of Mahidhar with the other Bengali neighbours. Adding to the odd nature of the situation is that all the others who had a copy of that photograph seem to have misplaced or lost the same. The issue is apparently trivial, but, nonetheless, intrigues the ever-alert Byomkesh.

Matters take a more serious turn when there is yet another attempted robbery, this time, at the house of the deputy magistrate, Umanath Ghosh. Falguni Pal, the artist, is murdered in cold blood.

In yet another twist, Byomkesh finds out that both Adinath Shome and Ashwini Ghatak are romantically inclined towards the beautiful Rajani.

The strange disappearance of that one photograph leads Byomkesh to believe that someone is trying to remove all evidence of his presence in the locality. And after a series of hits and misses, Byomkesh finds out the killer to be the banker, Amaresh Jha. He was trying to flee with the bank's money and used a fake beard, while in the group photograph he was not wearing it. He stole those photographs and killed Falguni as he drew Amaresh's sketch when he was not in his beard. But, to escape jail, he commits suicide in the local station in the presence of Byomkesh and some others. This was most disgusting to Byomkesh as he wanted to get hold of him alive.

== Cast ==
- Abir Chatterjee as Byomkesh Bakshi
- Saswata Chatterjee as Ajit
- Ushasie Chakraborty as Satyabati
- Arindol Bagchi
- Kaushik Sen
- Sudipa Bose
- Kunal Padhi
- Chandan Sen
- Pijush Ganguly
- Biswajit Chakraborty
- Swastika Mukherjee

== Sequel ==
Dutt made a sequel named Byomkesh Phire Elo released on 19 December 2014.

== See also ==
- Byomkesh Bakshi
- Satyanweshi
- Detective Byomkesh Bakshy
