= Satyanweshi (film) =

- Movie poster
- Directed by: Rituparno Ghosh
- Based on: Chorabali by Sharadindu Bandyopadhyay
- Produced by: Shrikant Mohta; Mahendra Soni
- Cinematography: Avik Mukhopadhyay
- Edited by: Arghyakamal Mitra
- Music by: Debajyoti Mishra
- Production company: Shree Venkatesh Films
- Release date: 6 September 2013
- Running time: 117 minutes
- Country: India
- Language: Bengali

Satyanweshi is a 2013 Bengali mystery-thriller film directed by Rituparno Ghosh (in his posthumous film) and produced by Shrikant Mohta and Mahendra Soni. This was Ghosh's last full-length film as a director. Indian film director Sujoy Ghosh played the fictional detective Byomkesh Bakshi in this film.

== Plot ==
Maharaja Arunangshu, the ruler of a princely state named Balabantpur, had made a wish list on his deathbed in the presence of Dewan Chandrashekhar, the family physician, Kaligati, and the High Priest. It laid down certain conditions under which his son Himangshu could inherit the kingdom. The first condition forbade Himangshu from marrying a non-Hindu girl, and the second demanded a legitimate heir within three years of his marriage. Bound by his father's conditions of succession, Himangshu is compelled to marry Alaka, an aspiring actress. A year and a half into the marriage, Harinath, the young palace librarian, who is friendly with Alaka, disappears without a trace. This mystery occasions the arrival of the sleuth Byomkesh and his author friend Ajit to Balabantpur. The visit, however, is under the pretext of an invitation to take part in a hunting expedition. In the course of their stay, they unravel many secrets involving the residents of the palace and also about the topography of Balabantpur. Byomkesh is particularly intrigued by the character of Kaligati, the royal physician, and uncovers several clues that connect Kaligati with the disappearance of Harinath. It is discovered that Alaka is sexually frigid. But she was anxious to continue the bloodline of Himangshu. Not getting any sexual pleasure from his wife, Himangshu was attracted to Leela, the daughter of Kaligati. On a previous hunting expedition, Alaka had sent Leela with Himanghshu instead of herself accompanying him. Thus, Leela became pregnant with his child. But Harinath, the librarian, loved Leela and wanted to marry her despite knowing she was carrying Himangshu's child. Kaligati found this inconvenient, as Leela's son would then be officially known as Harinath's son and not Himangshu's. Kaligati wanted to be the grandfather of the royal offspring. Thus, he orchestrated Harinath's drowning in quicksand on the night when he discovered Harinath had married Leela. The ensuing story revolves around the detective's unveiling of Kaligati as the culprit behind the mystery of Balabantpur.

== Cast ==
- Sujoy Ghosh as Byomkesh Bakshi
- Anindya Chatterjee as Ajit Bandyopadhyay
- Indraneil Sengupta as Himangshu
- Sibaji Bandyopadhyay as Kaligati
- Arpita Chatterjee as Aloka
- Anirban Ghosh as Horinath
- Anindya Bandyopadhyay as Arunangsho
- Sanjoy Nag as Diwan Chandrasekhar
- Anandi Ghosh as Leela

== Filming ==
Satyanweshi was Rituparno Ghosh's last full-length film as a director. Before his death on 30 May 2013, he completed shooting most of the film. The remaining work of the film was done by Ghosh's core team, though Sujoy Ghosh, the lead actor of the film, who is a director himself, proposed the same. The filming was done at the Gain Rajbari in Dhanyakuria
