= Byomkesh Bakshi (TV series) =

1993 Indian Television Series

- The intro of Byomkesh Bakshi's season 1
- Genre: Thriller
- Based on: Byomkesh Bakshi by Sharadindu Bandyopadhyay
- Written by: Sharadindu Bandyopadhyay; Basu Chatterjee; Mriganka Sekhar Ray
- Directed by: Basu Chatterjee
- Starring: Rajit Kapur; K. K. Raina; Sukanya Kulkarni
- Music by: Ananda Shankar
- Country of origin: India
- Original language: Hindi
- No. of seasons: 2
- No. of episodes: 32

Production
- Editors: Sanjay Malhotra (season 1); Birpal Singh (season 2); Godfrey Gonsalves (season 2)
- Running time: 40 minutes

Original release
- Network: DD National
- Release: 1993 – 1997

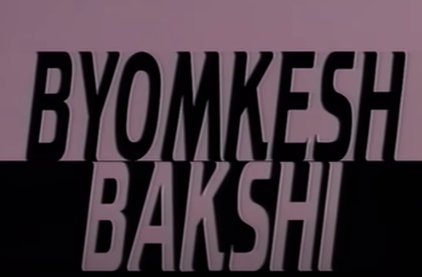
The intro of Byomkesh Bakshi's season 2

Byomkesh Bakshi is an Indian Hindi television series based on the fictional detective Byomkesh Bakshi character created by Sharadindu Bandyopadhyay. The series stars Rajit Kapur and K. K. Raina as Byomkesh Bakshi and Ajit Kumar Banerjee respectively. It features music and background score from Ananda Shankar. Upon release it became critically acclaimed. It was re-telecast on DD National in 2020 during the COVID-19 lockdown in India.

== Synopsis ==
Byomkesh Bakshi is a Bengali detective and a truth seeker who takes on spine-chilling cases with his friend Ajit Kumar Banerjee. Byomkesh identifies himself as Satyanweshi meaning 'truth seeker' rather than a detective. He stands out from other legendary detectives like Hercule Poirot or Sherlock Holmes because he is more concerned with truth than with law as evidenced from his cases where he lets the perpetrator die by manipulating the circumstances using their own methods as a redemption and deliverance of justice for the victim in absence of evidence as in Balak Jasoos, Ret Ka Daldal, and a few other cases.

Basu Chatterjee adapted each novel by Sharadindu Bandyopadhyay into an episode (except Chiriyaghar and Aadim Shatru, which are made in two-part episodes).

== Cast ==
- Rajit Kapur as Byomkesh Bakshi / Manoj Kumar (Fake) / Nikhilesh (Fake), a Bengali detective
- K. K. Raina as Ajit Kumar Banerjee / Jitendranath (Fake), Byomkesh's best-friend, a companion detective and a colleague of Byomkesh Bakshi
- Sukanya Kulkarni as Satyabati Bakshi, Byomkesh's wife, younger sister of Sukumar
- Kartik Dutta as Punti Kashi Ram (Servant)

=== Episodic appearances ===
- Abdul as Sachin Sanyal in Kamra No. 102
- Aditya Srivastava as Madhumoy Sur in Kahen Kavi Kalidas
- Ajay Srivastava as Murlidhar Singh in Kiley ka Rahasya
- Ajay Wadhavkar as Dr. Nagendra Pal in Chiriya Ghar (Part 1 & 2) (credited as Ajay Vadhavkar)
- Ajit Ghosh as Badridas's servant in Amrit ki Maut
- Alam as Mrs. Ghosh in Tasvir Chor and Salesgirl in Bemisaal
- Ali Akbar as Abhay in Makdi ka Ras
- Amal Sen as Nakul (Servant) in Sahi ka Kanta
- Anand as Manager in Dhokadhari
- Anang Desai as Himangshu Roy in Ret ka Daldal/Quicksand
- Anju as Nand Dulal's wife in Makdi ka Ras, Housewife in Bemisaal, and Sister in Lohe ka Biscuit
- Anup Soni as Nikhil in Veni Sanhar (credited as Anoop Soni)
- Anupama Chatterji as Sheela in Bhoot
- Apeksha Desai as Dr. Manna in Aag aur Patanga
- Arun Chakraborty as Sachin in Seemant Heera
- Arun Desai as Vishwanath Mullick in Amrit ki Maut and Dr. Gupta in Sahi ka Kanta
- Arun Mathur as Police Commissioner in Satyanveshi
- Ashdin Kapadia as Arun in Makdi ka Ras
- Shahnawaz Pradhan as Inspector Barat in the episodes Chiriya Ghar (Part 1 & 2) and unknown in Kahen Kavi Kalidas
- Ashiesh Roy as Makrand in Veni Sanhar (credited as Ashish Roy)
- Ashit K. Banerji as Motilal in Wasiyat and Hotel Manager in Balak Jasoos
- Ashok Mishra as Nepa (Secretary) in Aadim Shatru (Part 1 & 2), and Banmali Chandra in Paheli Gatha
- Ashok Tandey as Ram Roy in Paheli Gatha
- Asutosh Mishra as Ghanshyam in Satyanveshi
- Athar Qureishi as Dr. Mohan in Makdi ka Ras and Dr. Rakshit in Chakrant
- Avinash Masurekar as Ushanath Ghosh in Tasvir Chor and K.K. Mustafi (Lawyer) in Aadim Shatru (Part 1 & 2)
- Azad as Bikash in Aadim Shatru (Part 1 & 2)
- B. P. Singh as Beniprasad in Aag aur Patanga
- Babli Singh as Chandni in Aag aur Patanga and Lavani in Veni Sanhar
- Bablu Mukherji as Arvind Haldar in Kahen Kavi Kalidas
- Baghi Chandel as Shailendra Kumar in Bhoot and Bantu in Aadim Shatru (Part 1 & 2)
- Bhushan as Servant in Wasiyat
- Bhuvan Mansodia as Uday in Balak Jasoos
- Bunty Bahl as Manimoy Sarkar in Necklace
- Chadha as Sister's husband in Lohe ka Biscuit
- Chandra Mohan as Hotel Manager in Kamra No. 102
- Coca-Cola as Sohrab Homji in Pahari Rahasya
- Chandu Parkhi as Prafulla in Rastey ka Kanta and Keshto in Aadim Shatru (Part 1 & 2)
- Daji Bhatawadekar as Nand Dulal Babu in Makdi ka Ras and Beni Madhav in Veni Sanhar
- Darshan Lal as Professor in Kiley ka Rahasya
- Darshan as Ratan lal in Dhokadhari
- Deepak Qazir as Inspector in Kamra No. 102
- Dev Sharma as Gaurishankar in Kiley ka Rahasya and Manager in Aag aur Patanga
- Devendra Khandelwal as Tridivendra Narayan in Seemant Heera and Ret ka Daldal/Quicksand, and Ushanath in Vansh ka Khoon
- Dharma Nepali as Vakil Sahab in Kiley ka Rahasya, Darwan in Chakrant, and Landlord in Dhokadhari
- Dilip Roy Chaudhury as Bhootnath in Satyanveshi
- Dinyar Tirandaz as Inspector Sen in Wasiyat
- Dolon Roy as Mohini in Kahen Kavi Kalidas
- Gagan Gupta as Gopi in Satyanveshi, Nandlal Ghosh in Vansh ka Khoon, and Neelkanth Adhikari in Amrit ki Maut
- Ganesh Pande as Dr. Ghoshal in Kahen Kavi Kalidas
- Gopal as Lawyer in Anjaan Khooni
- Govind Dharmadhikari as Sadhu in Kiley ka Rahasya and Brajadas in Chiriya Ghar (Part 1 & 2)
- Govind Namdeo as Ramkishore Singh in Kiley ka Rahasya
- Harish Lalwani as Sujan Mitra in Sahi ka Kanta
- Harpal as Dev Narayan Singh in Aag aur Patanga
- Haneef Zahoor as Inspector Sashank in Bhoot, Inspector Haldar in Wasiyat ka Rahasya, and Gunadhar (Servant) in Kamra No. 102 (credited as Hanif Zahoor)
- Imran as Dasu in Amrit ki Maut
- Indrajeet Sachdev as Debu Mandal in Anjaan Khooni and Gangadhar in Veni Sanhar (credited as Indrajit Sachdev)
- Indrani Dutta as Uma in Necklace (credited as Indrani Dutt)
- Indira Chaudhury as Mother in Vansh ka Khoon
- Irshad Hashmi as Biren in Anjaan Khooni and Dr. Sen in Veni Sanhar
- Kalyan Chatterjee as Rakhal Das in Amrit ki Maut (credited as Kalyan Chatterji)
- Kanhaiya Nathani as Nakul Sarkar in Tasvir Chor
- Karunakar Pathak as Inspector Bhawani Prasad in Vansh ka Khoon and Someshwar Ghosh in Anjaan Khooni
- Kedar Sehgal as Inspector Guha in Paheli Gatha (credited as Kedar Saigal)
- Keshto Mitra as Ujre Singh in Seemant Heera and Bhootnath in Necklace (credited as Kesto Mitra)
- Khalid Mohammed as Servant in AgniBaan and Sahdeb (Servant) in Vansh ka Khoon
- Khudiram Bhattacharya as Inspector in Necklace
- Kishan as Himmatlal in Veni Sanhar
- Krishnakant as Kaligati Bhattacharya in Ret ka Daldal/Quicksand
- Kulbhushan as Harish (Servant) in Aadim Shatru (Part 1 & 2) and Ramadhin (Servant) in Bemisaal
- Kuldip Kaur as Hema in Anjaan Khooni
- Kumar Shirazi as Ramanath Niyogi in Laal Neelam
- Kush Kambli as Nitai in Aadim Shatru (Part 1 & 2)
- Lalla as Postman in Makdi ka Ras and Ramchatur (Servant) in Dhokadhari
- Loveraj Kambli as Nimai in Aadim Shatru (Part 1 & 2)
- Madhu Mohan as Madhubala in Aadim Shatru (Part 1 & 2)
- Madhumita as Phoolwati in Veni Sanhar
- Mahesh Raj as Inspector Sukhmoy Samant in Amrit ki Maut
- Mahesh Vachani as Ataullah in Kiley ka Rahasya
- Manasvi Singh as Inspector Biren in AgniBaan and Upsanhaar
- Manek Chaudhary as Ishwar Babu in Satyanveshi (credited as Manik Chaudhury)
- Mannjit Singh as Ajay in Veni Sanhar
- Mansoor as Police Doctor in Kamra No. 102
- Master Babloo as Gadadhar Singh in Kiley ka Rahasya
- Milind Gunaji as Debashish in Sahi ka Kanta
- Milon Mukherji as Major Burman in Anjaan Khooni
- Minaxi Shukla as Latika Chaudhury in Kamra No. 102
- Mrs. Mukherji as Chameli in Balak Jasoos
- Mukesh Ramani as Jugal in Balak Jasoos
- Mukul Nag as Prabal Gupta in Sahi ka Kanta
- Mulraj Rajda as Kailash Chandra in Bhoot
- Nandita Puri as Hemlvati in Pahari Rahasya
- Narayan Pati as Bansidhar Singh in Kiley ka Rahasya
- Narendra Gupta as Ravi Verma in Balak Jasoos
- Naresh Suri as Nilmani in Anjaan Khooni
- Naved Aslam as Sukumar in Wasiyat, Sitanshu Das in Vansh ka Khoon, and Sanat in Veni Sanhar
- Ninad Deshpande as Vijay in Chiriya Ghar (Part 1 & 2) and Bijoy Madhav in Sahi ka Kanta
- Nirupam Bhattacharya as Harinath (Masterji) in Ret ka Daldal/Quicksand
- Nivedita Tijoriwala as Lavanya in Wasiyat ka Rahasya
- P.K. Mukherji as Dr. Sen in Wasiyat ka Rahasya
- Parag Dave as Habul in AgniBaan
- Pardesi as Megraj in Veni Sanhar
- Pamela Mukherjee as Chingri in Balak Jasoos (credited as Pamela Mukherji)
- Pinaki Mukherjee as Gopal in Amrit ki Maut and Nengti in Balak Jasoos (credited as Pinaki Mukherji)
- Piyali Mukherjee as Jhilli in Veni Sanhar (credited as Piyali Mukherji)
- Prabha Mathur as Mukul in Chiriya Ghar (Part 1 & 2)
- Pramod Misrekar as Sadanand Sur in Amrit ki Maut and Dr. Sen in Sahi ka Kanta
- Prashant Jaiswal as Falguni Pal in Tasvir Chor, Leeladhar in Aag aur Patanga, and Kapil Bose in Sahi ka Kanta
- Prateeksha Lonkar as Laxmi in Chiriya Ghar (Part 1 & 2) and Shakuntala in Aag aur Patanga
- Pravin Kedia as Dayalhari in Aadim Shatru (Part 1 & 2)
- Prem Bedi as DSP Purandar Pande in Tasvir Chor, Kiley ka Rahasya, and Aag aur Patanga
- Prem Dutt as Bhuvaneshwar in Kahen Kavi Kalidas and Haripada in Paheli Gatha
- Prem Rishi as Maharaj Ramendra Sinha in Laal Neelam
- Puran Singh as Sardarji (Taxi Driver) in Upsanhaar
- Pushpa Verma as Habul's mother in AgniBaan and Gayatri in Veni Sanhar
- R.D. Shome as Panu Gopal in Chiriya Ghar (Part 1 & 2)
- R.S. Chopra as Rasmoy Sarkar in Necklace
- Rabi Ghosh as Badridas in Amrit ki Maut (credited as Robi Ghosh)
- Rabi Sinha as Bilash Mallick in Rastey ka Kanta
- Raees as Deep Narayan Singh in Aag aur Patanga
- Raghu Mulwal as Secretary in Seemant Heera and Kusheshwar in Wasiyat ka Rahasya
- Rahul Vaishnav as Master Ghosh in Tasvir Chor
- Raj Kamal as Professor Shome in Tasvir Chor
- Raj Shekhar as Tarashankar in Bhoot
- Rajendra Gupta as Mahidhar Chowdhury in Tasvir Chor and Santosh Samaddar in Balak Jasoos
- Rajesh Jais as Phani Chakraborty in Kahen Kavi Kalidas
- Raju Shrestha as Satyakam Das in Vansh ka Khoon
- Rakesh Dube as Manilal in Kiley ka Rahasya and Kharag Bahadur in Sahi ka Kanta
- Rakesh Vidua as Gangapada in Dhokadhari (credited as Rakesh Bidua)
- Rakesh Sahu as Chunni Lal in Wasiyat, Prabhat in Aadim Shatru (Part 1 & 2), and Tapan Sen in Bemisaal
- Ramamurty as Professor Deb Kumar in AgniBaan
- Raman Wadhawan as Dr. Shobhana Roy in Kamra No. 102
- Ramesh Gohil as Asutosh Mitra in Rastey ka Kanta
- Ramesh Goyal as Hukum Singh in Adrishya Trikon
- Rasik Dave as Inspector Ratikant Chaudhry in Aag aur Patanga
- Ravi Jhankal as Amar Raha in Tasvir Chor, and Inspector Sarkar in Chakrant, Dhokadhari, Sahi ka Kanta, Veni Sanhar, and Lohe ka Biscuit
- Ratna as Anna in Adrishya Trikon
- Raviraj as Dr. Palit in Aag aur Patanga, Deshpande in Pahari Rahasya, and Nripati Laha in Sahi ka Kanta
- Reshma Gopal as Malati in Tasvir Chor
- Richi Sharma as Chumki in Vansh ka Khoon
- Robin Gupta as Hotel Manager in Upsanhaar, Police Surgeon in Chakrant, and Hotel Manager in Paheli Gatha
- Rony Saha as Himangshu's daughter in Ret ka Daldal/Quicksand
- S.K. Das as Akshay Mandal in Lohe ka Biscuit
- S.S. Johar as TT Manotosh Roy in Amrit ki Maut
- Saavri as Sukumari in Balak Jasoos
- Sadhu Meher as Anadi Haldar in Aadim Shatru (Part 1 & 2) and Bishupal in Chakrant
- Sadiya Siddiqui as Rajni in Tasvir Chor (credited as Sadia Siddiqui)
- Salim Shah as Sunil in Adrishya Trikon
- Samir Jain as Ramhari in Ret ka Daldal/Quicksand
- Samir Jani as Bhola (Servant) in Necklace
- Sangeetha Balachandran as Damayanti in Chiriya Ghar (Part 1 & 2)
- Sashi Hans as Ramapati in Kiley ka Rahasya
- Shafiquddin as Patla in Amrit ki Maut
- Shahnawaz Pradhan as Inspector Barat in Chiriya Ghar (Part 1 & 2) and Kahen Kavi Kalidas (credited as Shahnawaz)
- Shail Chaturvedi as Rameshwar in Wasiyat ka Rahasya
- Shakti Singh as Inspector in Satyanveshi, Inspector Sanyal in Necklace, and Inspector Ramani Sanyal in Adrishya Trikon
- Shantanu Chhaparia as Ashok Maity in Dhokadhari
- Shekhar Navre as Inspector A.K. Ray in Bemisaal and Balak Jasoos
- Shilpa Tulaskar as Tulsi in Kiley ka Rahasya (credited as Shilpa Toraskar)
- Shivaji Sanyal as Rampirit Singh in Kamra No. 102
- Shreechand Makhija as Professor Nepal Gupta in Chiriya Ghar (Part 1 & 2) and Manik Mehta in Pahadi Rahasya
- Soma Chakravarty as Young Lady in Rastey ka Kanta
- Somesh Agarwal as Sharda Prasad in Bhoot and Hotel owner in Aadim Shatru (Part 1 & 2)
- Subroto Bose as Bijoy Biswas in Pahari Rahasya
- Suchitra Bandekar as Deepa in Sahi ka Kanta (credited as Suchitra Gudekar)
- Sujata Gokhale as Reba in Adrishya Trikon
- Suhas Palshikar as Naresh Mandal in Dhokadhari (credited as Suhas Palsikar)
- Sumant Mastakar as Pranhari Poddar in Kahen Kavi Kalidas (credited as Sumant Mastkar)
- Sunil Chauhan as Mrigen Mullick in Kahen Kavi Kalidas
- Sunil Dhawan as Dr. Rudra in AgniBaan and Chintamani Kundu in Bemisaal
- Suneel Sinha as Abhay Ghoshal in Chakrant (credited as Sunil Sinha)
- Sunita as Nalini in Wasiyat ka Rahasya
- Suresh Bhagwat as Anukul Babu in Satyanveshi, and Anukul Babu disguised as Byomkesh Bose / Hasrat / Kokanand Gupta in Upsanhaar
- Swadesh Mahan as Bhupesh Chatterji in Paheli Gatha
- Sweeti as Hema in Balak Jasoos
- Tahira as Salesgirl in Bemisaal
- Tushar Majumdar as Makhan Lal in Wasiyat
- Tushar Trivedi as Jagabandhu Patra in Kamra No. 102
- Utpal Dutt as Sir Digindra Narayan in Seemant Heera
- Varsha Agnihotri as Shanti in Bemisaal
- Vicky as Postman in Upsanhaar
- Vijayan Nair as Ushanath Sen in Chiriya Ghar (Part 1 & 2) and Kamalkant Das in Lohe ka Biscuit
- Vilas Raj as Vilas in Anjaan Khooni
- Vinay Malhotra as Harihar in Laal Neelam and Kalikinkar Das in Anjaan Khooni
- Virendra Saxena as Dr. Ghatak in Tasvir Chor
- Yasmin as Yasmin in Veni Sanhar
- Yatin Karyekar as Manmath Rudra (Nantu) in AgniBaan
- Yusuf Khurram as Dr. Bhujangdhar Das in Chiriya Ghar (Part 1 & 2)
- Zafar as Bhuteshwar in Vansh ka Khoon and Motilal in Anjaan Khooni

== Episodes ==
The first season had 13 and the second season had 19 episodes.

=== Season 1 (1993) ===
1. Satyanweshi (transl. seeker of truth): In 1932, Byomkesh Bakshi investigates murders that have taken place in the Chinatown locality. He assumes an alias and starts living in the hostel run by the homeopathic doctor Anukul babu. Initially told that there weren't rooms available, he convinces Ajit Kumar Banerjee to share a room with him. Then, by applying deductive methods, he soon identifies the murderer and induces an attack from him, and thereby catching him red-handed.
2. Raste Ka Kanta (transl. Obstacle, impediment, or a nuisance): In 1933, an advertisement in the newspaper draws the attention of Bakshi. Although seemingly funny, this advertisement Agar aap raaste ke kaante se... it seems to have a more dangerous implication. A client approaches Bakshi and narrates how he was almost pierced by an object while walking on the street. Byomkesh investigates the matter and catches this dangerous person who has a special method of killing people.
3. Seemant Heera (transl. The Frontier Diamond) : The case revolves in 1934 around the theft of a priceless heirloom, and Byomkesh and Ajit are invited by the current heir to recover it from the heir's uncle, as consumed by greed, he has stolen it. His uncle offers to let Byomkesh and Ajit search the house for seven days. Byomkesh cracks the culprit's expertise in sculpting and eventually succeeds in getting the Seemant Heera back.
4. Makdi Ka Ras (transl. "Juice of a Spider" or "Spider Fluid"): In 1934, Byomkesh meets Mohan, one of Ajit's school friends and a doctor by profession who shares an intriguing event with them and seeks Bakshi's help. One of his patients, Nand Dulal Babu, has a weird addiction to Tarantula's fluid, which is gradually damaging his health. Despite the strict vigilance, how the fluid reaches Nandlal babu becomes the biggest question. But Bakshi solves the case in no time.
5. Wasiyat (transl. "Will" or "Testament") : In 1935, Karali Babu, a wealthy Bengali, with no direct heir, has been murdered in his sleep. As Byomkesh determines later in the story, the victim was killed in such a way that hints at the culprit having knowledge of medical procedures. The fact that the victim was in the habit of frequently changing his will out of temper makes it likely that anyone who could inherit his wealth would have killed him. Byomkesh probes the case and gets hold of the murderer. During this case, he meets Satyabati for the first time who is shown as his wife in the later episodes.
6. Ret ka Daldal (Quicksand): During a vacation in 1936, Byomkesh and Ajit meet a financially troubled landlord whose daughter's tutor has strangely gone missing with the account books of his estate. The unexpected solution of the case revolves around a patch of quicksand somewhere near the landlord's residence.
7. Laal Neelam (transl. Red Sapphire) : In 1936, while Byomkesh talks about the release from jail of a criminal with a record of theft, loot, fraud and many such crimes, Ramanath Niyogi, he gets news regarding Maharaja Ramendra Singh's secretary, Harihar's murder. Harihar, who used to be a criminal years ago but had mended his ways later, was pitilessly killed; Singh insists Bakshi look into the matter and find out the culprit, which he eventually succeeds in. Since this episode, Satyabati is shown as Byomkesh's wife.
8. Bhoot (transl. "Evil spirit" or "Ghost"): In 1936, Byomkesh investigates a case about allegedly a ghost haunting a house. He eventually succeeds in finding the person, who posed as the ghost to search and steal diamonds from the house.
9. Agnibaan (transl. Arrow of fire) : In 1944, as the daughter of Professor Deb Kumar dies mysteriously in the kitchen, while the former is in the Science Congress in Delhi (and also just after a new insurance policy venture of having the husband and wife, in which if one dies the other gets all the insurance), Byomkesh Bakshi decides to investigate the case himself and determine the cause of her death.
10. Upasanhaar (transl. Epilogue) : In 1945, Byomkesh gets a set deadly matches (of Professor Deb Kumar) when he was about to smoke. He asked everyone, including Puntiram and Satyavati. Then he remembered that it was a muffled man who asked his matches to smoke. Later, he got a letter from a Kokanand Gupta to Byomkesh Bose. Bakshi never thought that there was another Byomkesh in the locality. Eventually, the person who wanted Bakshi to die was none other than Anukul babu from Satyanweshi, who decided to take revenge against Byomkesh.
11. Tasvir Chor (transl. "Picture Thief" or "Photograph Thief") : When a group photo gets missing and a painter, Phalguni Pal gets murdered, Inspector Purandar Pandey requests Byomkesh to find the murderer and thief.
12. Kile Ka Rahasya (transl. The Mystery of the Fort) : Byomkesh and Ajit visit a fort, where they meet their police friend Purandar Pandey. When a professor dies seemingly by snakebite, the reactions of others lead Byomkesh to deduce that there was more than what meets the eye.
13. Chiriya Ghar transl. "Zoo" or "Vivarium") (Part 1) & Chiriya Ghar (Part 2): Byomkesh is approached by a new client, Nishanath Sen, to find out if a yesteryear actress is living incognito, among others, in his household. When Nishanath is murdered, Byomkesh decides to probe into the case with the help of his close aide, Ajit.

=== Season 2 (1997) ===
1. Aadim Shatru (transl. "The primal enemy," "The earliest enemy," or "The original foe") (Part 1)
2. Aadim Shatru (Part 2)
3. Aag Aur Patanga (transl. "Fire and moth")
4. Vansh Ka Khoon (transl. "Blood of the lineage" or "Blood of the family/dynasty")
5. Necklace
6. Amrit ki Maut transl. "Death of nectar" or "Death like the loss of immortality/elixir")
7. Pahari Rahasya (transl. "The secret of the hills" or "Mystery of the mountains")
8. Anjaan Khooni (transl. Unknown killer)
9. Kahen Kavi Kalidas (transl. "Thus spoke the poet Kalidasa" or "The poet Kalidasa says")
10. Adrishya Trikon (transl. Invisible Triangle)
11. Wasiyat ka Rahasya (transl. The Mystery of the Will)
12. Bemisaal (transl. Unparalleled, matchless, unique, or incomparable)
13. Balak Jasoos (transl. "Child spy" or "Kid detective")
14. Chakrant (transl. Conspiracy, plot, intrigue, or machination)
15. Paheli Gatha (transl. "a song, verse, or tale of a riddle" or "a riddle told in verse.")
16. Kamra No. 102 (transl. Room No. 102)
17. Dhokadhari (transl. Fraud, cheating, or deception)
18. Sahi ka Kanta (transl. "Porcupine's quill" or "Porcupine's thorn")
19. Veni Sanhar (transl. The Binding of the Braid)
20. Lohe ka Biscuit (transl. "Iron biscuit" or "Iron ingot/slab")

== See also ==
- Byomkesh Bakshi in other media
