= List of Indian Bengali films of 2019 =

This is a list of Bengali language films released in India in the year 2019.

== January–March ==
Opening		Title	Director	Cast	Production company	Ref.
J A N U A R Y	4	Bijoya	Kaushik Ganguly	Jaya Ahsan, Abir Chatterjee, Kaushik Ganguly, Lama Halder	Opera Movies	
J A N U A R Y	4	Goyenda Tatar	Srikanta Galui	Adhiraj Ganguly, Kharaj Mukherjee, Rajatava Dutta, Shantilal Mukherjee, Monu Mukherjee	G V Tech Solution Pvt. Ltd.	
J A N U A R Y	11	Dotara	Amitabh Dasgupta	Snigdha Pandey, Rajesh Sharma, Sonali Chowdhury, Subrat Dutta, Biswajit Chakraborty	Tapasi Dasgupta Communication	
J A N U A R Y	18	Jamai Badal	Rabi Kinagi	Soham Chakraborty, Koushani Mukherjee, Payel Sarkar, Hiran Chatterjee	Surinder Films	
J A N U A R Y	18	Shah Jahan Regency	Srijit Mukherji	Anjan Dutt, Mamata Shankar, Rituparna Sengupta, Rudranil Ghosh, Abir Chatterjee, Parambrata Chatterjee, Rudranil Ghosh, Abir Chatterjee	Shree Venkatesh Films	
J A N U A R Y	18	Ek Mutho Roddur	Arindam Banerjee	Kharaj Mukherjee, Debranjan Nag, Supriyo Dutta, Chayanika	Aakanksha Multimedia Pvt. Ltd.	
F E B R U A R Y	1	Mukhomukhi	Kamaleshwar Mukherjee	Jisshu Sengupta, Gargi Roychowdhury, Rajatava Dutta, Payel Sarkar	Friends Communication	
F E B R U A R Y	1	Jah Kala Horke Gelo Hiseb	Anirban Chakraborty	Aditya Ena	Mayurs Troupe and Entertainment	
F E B R U A R Y	8	Baccha Shoshur	Biswarup Biswas	Jeet, Koushani Mukherjee, Chiranjeet Chakraborty	Surinder Films	
F E B R U A R Y	8	Tritiya Adhyay	Manoj A Michigan	Abir Chatterjee, Paoli Dam	Pushprekha International	
F E B R U A R Y	8	Prem Amar 2	Bidula Bhattacharjee	Adrit Roy, Puja Cherry Roy	Raj Chakraborty Production	
F E B R U A R Y	8	Finally Bhalobasha	Anjan Dutt	Anjan Dutt, Raima Sen, Arjun Chakrabarty , Anirban Bhattacharya, Arindam Sil	SVF	
F E B R U A R Y	15	Nagarkirtan	Kaushik Ganguly	Ritwick Chakraborty, Riddhi Sen	Acropoliis Entertainment	
F E B R U A R Y	15	Bhobishyoter Bhoot	Anik Dutta	Paran Bandopadhyay, Sabyasachi Chakrabarty, Swastika Mukherjee, Barun Mukherjee, Kaushik Sen	Indibily Films	
F E B R U A R Y	22	Ahaa Re	Ranjan Ghosh	Arifin Shuvo, Rituparna Sengupta, Amrita Chattopadhyay	Bhavna-Aaj-O-Kal	
F E B R U A R Y	22	Bristi Tomake Dilam	Arnab Pal	Jaya Ahsan, Chiranjeet Chakraborty, Rajatava Dutta, Badshah Moitra	Balajee Motion Pictures	
F E B R U A R Y	22	Barof	Sudip Chakraborty	Indrani Halder, Shataf Figar, Swatilekha Sengupta	Cinex Entertainment	
M A R C H	1	Mahalaya	Soumik Sen	Kanchan Mullick, Kaushik Sen, Jisshu Sengupta	Nideas Creations and Productions Pvt Ltd	
M A R C H	1	WMT-9615	Tamal Dasgupta	Samadarshi Dutta, Debolina Dutta, Aloknanda Banerjee, Kaushik Roy	Mahi Film Production and Marketing Pvt. Ltd.	
M A R C H	1	The Hacker	Siddhartha Sen, Subrata Mondal	Aryann Bhowmick, Ena Saha, Deboprasad Halder	Lace Styles Films	
M A R C H	8	Thai Curry	Ankit Aditya	Hiran Chatterjee, Soham Chakraborty, Trina Saha, Bidya Sinha Saha Mim, Rudranil Ghosh, Rachel White, Saswata Chatterjee	Greentouch Entertainment	
M A R C H	8	Mukherjee Dar Bou	Pritha Chakraborty	Anusuya Majumdar, Koneenica Banerjee, Rituparna Sengupta, Aparajita Auddy, Biswanath Basu, Badshah Moitra	Windows	
M A R C H	15	71 Broken Lines	Suman Maitra	Sourav Roy, Lahari Chakraborty, Soumitra Ghosh, Koushik Goswami, Sushil Sikaria	Chirosqro Films	
M A R C H	15	Shankar Mudi	Aniket Chattopadhyay	Kaushik Ganguly, Jisshu Sengupta, Anjan Dutta, Shantilal Mukherjee, Saswata Chaterjee, Rudranil Ghosh, Kanchan Mullick, Sreela Majumdar, Biswanath Basu	RP Techvision India Private Limited	
M A R C H	15	Kolkatay Kohinoor	Santanu Ghosh	Soumitra Chatterjee, Sabyasachi Chakraborty, Indrani Dutta, Debdut Ghosh, Ankita Majumdar, Mona Dutta	Angurbala Films	
M A R C H	15	The Lovely Mrs. Mookherjee	Indranil Roychowdhury	Bratya Basu, Swastika Mukherjee	FlipBook Production	
M A R C H	15	Kusumitar Gappo	Hrishikesh Mondal	Soumitra Chatterjee, Madhabi Mukherjee, Shilton Paul, Ushasie Chakraborty, Debesh Roy Chowdhury, Manasi Sinha, Dulal Lahiri	Chhaya Rani Films Rahul film & Teleproduction	
M A R C H	21	Mon Jaane Na	Shagufta Rafique	Yash Dasgupta, Mimi Chakraborty	Shree Venkatesh Films	
M A R C H	29	Googly	Abhimanyu Mukherjee	Soham Chakraborty, Srabanti Chatterjee	Surinder Films	
M A R C H	29	Dwikhondito	Nabarun Sen	Saswata Chatterjee, Soumitra Chatterjee, Saayoni Ghosh	Frameview Entertainment	
M A R C H	29	Sweater	Shieladitya Moulik	Ishaa Saha, June Malia, Sreelekha Mitra, Kharaj Mukherjee, Saurav Das, Sidhu Ray, Farhan Imroze, Anuradha Mukherjee	PSS Entertainments P&P Entertainment and Pramod Films	
M A R C H	29	Kia and Cosmos	Sudipto Roy	Ritwika Pal, Swastika Mukherjee, Joy Sengupta, Amaan Reza	AVA Film Productions Pvt. Ltd	

== April–June ==
Opening		Title	Director	Cast	Production company	Ref.
A P R I L	5	Basu Poribar	Suman Ghosh	Soumitra Chaterjee, Aparna Sen, Rituparna Sengupta, Saswata Chaterjee, Paran Banerjee, Lily Chakravarty, Koushik Sen	Vignesh Films	
A P R I L	12	Vinci Da	Srijit Mukherji	Rudranil Ghosh, Sohini Sarkar, Ritwick Chakraborty, Anirban Bhattacharya, Riddhi Sen	SVF Entertainment	
A P R I L	12	Tui Amar Rani	Pijush Saha	Surya, Misty Jannat, Lama Halder, Rajesh Sharma	Prince Entertainment P4	
A P R I L	12	Tarikh	Churni Ganguly	Saswata Chatterjee, Raima Sen, Ritwick Chakraborty	Opera Movies	
A P R I L	19	Misha	Subhransu Basu	Tota Roy Chowdhury, Sabyasachi Chakraborty, Rajesh Sharma, Kharaj Mukherjee, Tulika Basu, Arun Bandyopadhyay, Sumit Samaddar	Siona Entertainment Pvt. Ltd.	
A P R I L	26	Jyeshthoputro	Kaushik Ganguly	Prosenjit Chatterjee, Ritwick Chakraborty	Surinder Films	
A P R I L	26	Ke Tumi Nandini	Pathikrit Basu	Bonny Sengupta, Rupsha Mukkhopadhyay	Shree Venkatesh Films	
M A Y	10	Konttho	Nandita Roy, Shiboprosad Mukherjee	Shiboprosad Mukherjee, Paoli Dam, Jaya Ahsan, Koneenica Banerjee, Chitra Sen	Windows Production House	
M A Y	17	Wrong Number	Pandit Subendu	Sourav Das, Saayoni Ghosh, Durga Santra, Sanadarshi Dutta	Swastika Film Production	
M A Y	17	Bhoot Chaturdashi	Shabbir Mallick	Aryann Bhowmick, Ena Saha, Soumendra Bhattacharya, Deepsheta Mitra	Shree Venkatesh Films	
M A Y	17	Atithi	Sujit Paul	Rituparna Sengupta, Manoj Mitra, Pratik Sen, Nishan Nanaiah, Saayoni Ghosh, Subhashish Mukherjee, Biswanath Basu	Artage Films, Incoda Movies	
M A Y	24	Durgeshgorer Guptodhon	Dhrubo Banerjee	Abir Chatterjee, Arjun Chakrabarty, Ishaa Saha, Anindya Chaterjee, Kaushik Sen, Aryann Bhowmick, Lily Chakravarty, June Maliah, Kharaj Mukherjee, Arindam Sil	Shree Venkatesh Films	
M A Y	24	Shakkhi	Shouvick Sarkar	Saayoni Ghosh, Arjun Chakrabarty, Debshankar Halder, Shantilal Mukherjee, Anindya Bannerjee, Locket Chatterjee	Dayal Production	
M A Y	24	Baghini	Nehal Dutta	Ruma Chakraborty, Falguni Chatterjee	Mondal Films and Entertainment	
J U N E	5	Kidnap	Raja Chanda	Dev, Rukmini Maitra, Chandan Sen	Surinder Films	
J U N E	5	Shesh Theke Shuru	Raj Chakraborty	Jeet, Koel Mallick	Jeetz Filmworks, Rising Film Productions	
J U N E	7	Saat No. Sanatan Sanyal	Annapurna Basu	Saheb Bhattacharya, Bibhash Chakraborty, Saoli Chatterjee	Zee5	
J U N E	14	Tushagni	Rana Bannerjee	Arjun Chakraborty, Amrita Chattyopadhyay, Soma Chakraborty, Debesh Roy Chowdhury, Rana Bannerjee	Purple Movie Town, Open Door Entertainment	
J U N E	21	Bibaho Obhijaan	Birsa Dasgupta	Ankush Hazra, Nusrat Faria, Rudranil Ghosh, Sohini Sarkar, Anirban Bhattacharya, Priyanka Sarkar	Shree Venkatesh Films	
J U N E	28	Bhokatta	Ramesh Rauth	Om Sahani, Elina Samanta Roy	Eskay Movies	
J U N E	28	Network	Saptaswa Basu	Saswata Chatterjee, Sabyasachi Chakraborty, Rini Ghosh, Indrajit Mazumder, Kartikey Tripathi, Bhaskar Banerjee, Eshani Ghosh, Saayoni Ghosh	Neo Studios	

== July–September ==
Opening		Title	Director	Cast	Production company	Ref.
J U L Y	5	Bhootchakra Pvt Ltd	Haranath Chakraborty	Soham Chakraborty, Srabanti Chaterjee, Gaurav Chakrabarty, Bonny Sengupta, Rittika Sen, Paran Bandhopadhyay, Kaushik Sen	Surinder Films	
J U L Y	19	Shesher Golpo	Jiit Chakraborty	Soumitra Chatterjee, Mamata Shankar, Kharaj Mukherjee, Durga Santra, Pallabi Chatterjee	Swastika Film Production	
J U L Y	19	Sitara	Ashis Roy	Nassar, Raima Sen, Subrat Dutta, Meghna Naidu, Zahid Hasan	Shivani Entertainment	
J U L Y	26	Bornoporichoy	Mainak Bhowmick	Abir Chatterjee, Jisshu Sengupta, Priyanka Sarkar	Shree Venkatesh Films	
A U G U S T	2	Char A 420	Atiul Islam	Soumitra Chatterjee, Kharaj Mukherjee, Raju Majumdar, Partha Sarathi, Ivlina Chakraborty, Debashish Ganguly, Arun Bandhyopadhyay	Zenith Production House	
A U G U S T	2	Samsara	Abhijit Guha	Ritwick Chakraborty, Indrajit Chakravarty, Rahul Banerjee, Sudipta Chakraborty, Tanusree Chakraborty, Ambarish Bhattacharya	Friday & Co.	
A U G U S T	2	Name Plate	Anil Prem Srivastava	Koel Dhar, Kajal Chakraborty, Rana Mukherjee	Ankhilata Telefilms	
A U G U S T	9	Panther: Hindustan Meri Jaan	Anshuman Pratyush	Jeet, Shraddha Das, Saswata Chatterjee	Jeetz Filmworks	
A U G U S T	16	Shantilal O Projapoti Rohoshyo	Pratim D. Gupta	Ritwick Chakraborty, Paoli Dam, Goutam Ghose	Auroville Movies	
A U G U S T	16	Barude Fuler Gandho	Narugopal Mandal	Arindom Chatterjee, Kalyani Mondal, Bhola Tamang	Shree Shree Om Narasingha Jiu Production	
A U G U S T	23	Gotro	Shiboprosad Mukherjee, Nandita Roy	Anashua Majumdar, Nigel Akkara, Saheb Chatterjee	Windows Production	
S E T E M B E R	6	Parineeta	Raj Chakraborty	Subhashree Ganguly, Gaurav Chakrabarty, Ritwick Chakraborty, Falaque Rashid Roy, Adrit Roy	Raj Chakraborty Productions	
S E T E M B E R	6	Weekend E Surjoday	Ajantrik	Paran Bandyopadhyay, Anusua Mukherjee, Chandan Sen, Debdut Ghosh, Basabdatta Chattopadhyay, Pamela Khaitan	West Bengal Democratic Writers Artists Association	
S E T E M B E R	13	Bhalo Maye Kharap Maye	Tamal Dasgupta	Ananya Chatterjee, Silajit Majumder, Joy Sengupta	Srijita Films and Entertainment	
S E T E M B E R	13	Adda	Devayush Chowdhary	Soumitra Chatterjee, Sabyasachi Chakraborty, Saayoni Ghosh, Sourav Das, Indrasish Roy	Maxim Pictures & Reeldrama Production	
S E T E M B E R	20	Sotoroi September	Amitabha Bhattacharya	Soham Chakraborty, Arunima Ghosh, Biswajit Chakraborty, Papiya Adhikari	Camellia Productions	
S E T E M B E R	20	Hulusthulu	Sujit Chakraborty	Kharaj Mukherjee, Biswajit Chakraborty, Biswanath Basu, Anamika Saha, Durga Satra, Sagar Dutta	Maa Bhavani Films	
S E T E M B E R	20	Rajlokhi O Srikanto	Pradipta Bhattacharyya	Ritwick Chakraborty, Rahul Banerjee, Aparajita Ghosh Das	Reelistic Production	
S E T E M B E R	20	Goyenda Junior	Mainak Bhaumik	Rwitobroto Mukherjee, Shantilal Mukherjee, Krishnendu Adhikari, Anusha Vishwanathan	Shree Venkatesh Films	
S E T E M B E R	20	Buddhu Bhutum	Nitish Roy	Koneenica Mukherjee, Locket Chatterjee	Kanchan Media	
S E T E M B E R	20	Paddar Valobasha	Md Harun Uz Zaman	Sumit Sen & Airin Sultana	Shopnochura Film International	

== October–December ==
Opening		Title	Director	Cast	Production company	Ref.
O C T O B E R	2	Gumnaami	Srijit Mukherji	Prosenjit Chatterjee, Anirban Bhattacharya, Biplab Dasgupta, Tnusree Chakraborty	Shree Venkatesh Films	
O C T O B E R	2	Password	Kamaleshwar Mukherjee	Dev, Rukmini Maitra, Parambrata Chatterjee, Paoli Dam, Adrit Roy	Dev Entertainment Ventures	
O C T O B E R	2	Mitin Mashi	Arindam Sil	Koel Mallick, Vinay Pathak	Camellia Production Pvt. Ltd.	
O C T O B E R	2	Satyanweshi Byomkesh	Sayantan Ghosal	Parambrata Chatterjee, Rudranil Ghosh	Greentouch Entertainment	
N O V E M B E R	1	Buro Sadhu	VIK	Ritwick Chakraborty, Chiranjeet Chakraborty, Ishaa Saha, Dolon Roy	Wisemonk Creative	
N O V E M B E R	1	Kedara	Indraadip Dasgupta	Kaushik Ganguly, Rudranil Ghosh	Kaleidoscope	
N O V E M B E R	1	Thikana Bridhyasram	Subir Paul Choudhuri	Manoj Mitra, Soma Chakraborty, Biswajit Chakraborty	Map Movies, Gravity Entertainment	
N O V E M B E R	8	Ghoon	Shuvro Roy	Saurav Das, Poulomi Das, Anusha Biswanathan	Infocare (I) Entertainment Pvt. Ltd.	
N O V E M B E R	15	Ghawre Bairey Aaj	Aparna Sen	Jisshu Sengupta, Anirban Bhattacharya, Tuhina Das	Shree Venkatesh Films	
N O V E M B E R	22	Teko	Abhimanyu Mukherjee	Ritwick Chakraborty, Srabanti Chatterjee	Surinder Films	
N O V E M B E R	22	Purba Paschim Dakshin	Rajorshi Dey	Paran Bandopadhyay, Arpita Chatterjee, Gaurav Chakrabarty	Just Studio	
N O V E M B E R	29	Hari Ghoser Gowal	Subhabrata Chatterjee	Partha, Srija, Anish Sharma	Prince Entertainment P4	
N O V E M B E R	29	Triangle	Anindya Sarkar	Kaushik Sen, Satyabdi Chakraborty	Baba Bhoothnath Entertainment	
N O V E M B E R	29	Ei Poth Jodi Na Shesh Hoye	Soham Dasgupta	Soham Dasgupta, Abhinandan Maiti, bharati gupta.anan barman	Soham Dasgupta Films	46
N O V E M B E R	29	Surjo Prithibir Chardike Ghore	Arijit Biswas	Anjan Dutta, Paran Bandhopadhyay, Chiranjeet Chakraborty	AVA Film Productions Pvt Ltd	
D E C E M B E R	6	Bhalobasar Golpo	Raja Sen	Devika Sengupta, Saswata Chatterjee,	Silverline Motion Pictures	
D E C E M B E R	6	Sagardwipey Jawker Dhan	Sayantan Ghosal	Parambrata Chatterjee, Gaurav Chakrabarty, Koel Mallick	Surinder Films	
D E C E M B E R	13	Zombiesthaan	Abhirup Ghosh	Rudranil Ghosh, Tanusree Chakraborty, Rajatava Dutta, Souman Bose	Krishna Motion Pictures	
D E C E M B E R	20	Professor Shonku O El Dorado	Sandip Ray	Dhritiman Chatterjee, Subhashish Mukhopadhyay	Shree Venkatesh Films	
D E C E M B E R	20	Sanjhbati	Saibal Banerjee, Leena Gangopadhyay	Soumitra Chatterjee, Dev, Paoli Dam, Lily Chakravarty	Atanu Ray Chaudhuri	
D E C E M B E R	27	Robibaar	Atanu Ghosh	Prosenjit Chatterjee, Jaya Ahsan	Echo Entertainment Private Limited	
D E C E M B E R	30	Atanker Choya	Rocky Rupkumar Patra	Rajkumar Patra, Subhadeep	Patras Glam Entertainment	
