= Vadhuvu =

Indian drama thriller television series

- Promotional release poster
- Genre: Thriller drama
- Written by: Sahana Dutta
- Directed by: Poluri Krishna
- Starring: Avika Gor; Ali Reza; Nandu
- Music by: Sriram Maddury
- Country of origin: India
- Original language: Telugu
- No. of seasons: 1
- No. of episodes: 7

Production
- Producers: Srikanth Mohta; Mahendra Soni
- Cinematography: Ram K Mahesh
- Editor: Anil Kumar Pasala
- Running time: 17-23 minutes
- Production company: Shree Venkatesh Films

Original release
- Network: Disney+ Hotstar
- Release: 8 December 2023

Vadhuvu is an Indian Telugu-language thriller drama television series written by Sahana Dutta and directed by Poluri Krishna. Produced by Srikanth Mohta and Mahendra Soni under the banner of Shree Venkatesh Films, it stars Avika Gor, Ali Reza and Nandu. It premiered 8 December 2023 on Disney+ Hotstar. This series is an official remake of Bengali Hoichoi series Indu.

== Plot ==
Indu is about to get married into a mysterious family. She initially was supposed to be married to Sanjay but her sister Bhanu runs away with him. On the night before marriage, her family receives gifts from the groom's family. That includes a jackfruit that seems to have been stitched. Family opens it up to find a leaf in it.

Indu goes to her granny with the leaf and asks what it is, which turns out to be extremely poisonous devil's trumpet. On the other hand, Anand's family is also tense as he also had three failed attempts of getting married and both families want to get done with the wedding without any hiccups.

After marriage and between the ceremonies, Indu encounters many suspicious incidents which lead her to suspect on all her in-laws. Amidst this, news of her sister-in-law committing suicide takes family into storm and Indu comes to a conclusion that it is Arya, who is behind all this fassade.

== Cast ==
- Avika Gor as Anjuri Indu
- Nandu as Anand, Indu's husband
- Ali Reza as Arya
- Rupa Lakshmi
- Soujas Renukuntla as Sanjay

== Production ==
The series is the Telugu remake of the 2021 Bengali Hoichoi web series Indu, directed by Sayantan Ghosal. The principal photography of the series commenced with Avika Gor, Ali Reza and Nandu joining the cast. The series was announced by Disney+ Hotstar.

== Reception ==
The series was reviewed by 123telugu and ABP Desam, who rated it 2.75 stars out of 5, while Hindustan Times and OTTPlay rated the series 3 out of 5 stars in their reviews.
