= Guptodhoner Sandhane =

2018 Bengali adventure mystery film

- Theatrical release poster
- Guptodhoner Sondhane
- Directed by: Dhrubo Banerjee
- Written by: Dhrubo Banerjee Originally copied from ‘Shahjada Sujar Sinduk’ written by Dhirendra Lal Dhar
- Produced by: Mahendra Soni; Shrikant Mohta
- Starring: Abir Chatterjee; Arjun Chakrabarty; Ishaa Saha; Rajatabha Dutta; Goutam Ghose; Arindam Sil
- Cinematography: Soumik Haldar
- Edited by: Sanjib Kumar Dutta
- Music by: Bickram Ghosh
- Production company: Shree Venkatesh Films
- Release date: 27 April 2018 (India)
- Running time: 133 minutes
- Country: India
- Language: Bengali

Guptodhoner Sondhane (transl. Quest for the hidden treasure) is a 2018 Indian Bengali-language action-adventure film written and directed by Dhrubo Banerjee and produced by Shrikant Mohta and Mahendra Soni under the banner of Shree Venkatesh Films. The film was a blockbuster at the box-office.

== Plot ==
Professor Subarna Sen, alias Sonada, is a professor of history at Oxford University. Returning to India after several years, Sonada meets his nephew Abir and Jhinuk, Abir's best friend. Abir takes Sonada to their ancestral home in the village of Manikantapur, where Abir’s eccentric but erudite maternal uncle Harinarayan Singha Roy had recently died under mysterious circumstances. During their visit, they learn of the 350-year-old Mughal treasure of emperor Shah Jahan's second son, Prince Shuja, that is hidden somewhere in that palace. Before his death, Harinarayan Singha Roy had left a clue in his diary to help Abir locate the treasure. At the same time, they discover that the local promoter and political hopeful Dashanan Da also knows about the treasure and is trying to steal it.

== Cast ==
- Abir Chatterjee as Professor Subarna Sen aka Sonada
- Arjun Chakrabarty as Abir, Sonada's nephew
- Ishaa Saha as Jhinuk, Abir's friend and love interest
- Rajatabha Dutta as Dashanan Da
- Kamaleshwar Mukherjee as Akhilesh, Jhinuk's father

Cameo appearance

- Goutam Ghose as Harinarayan Singha Roy, Abir's eccentric maternal uncle
- Arindam Sil as Abir's father
- Baisakhi Marjit as Abir's mother

== Production ==
=== Development and filming ===
The film was directed by Dhrubo Banerjee and written by Banerjee and Subhendu Dasmunsi.

Banerjee conceived of the film as part of a franchise with the same protagonist, and has already written the next two stories.

Shooting started at the end of December 2017, on location at Kolkata and Bolpur.

== Release ==
The trailer launched on 27 March 2018. The film released on 27 April 2018.

== Soundtrack ==
Guptodhoner Sandhane

Soundtrack album by Bickram Ghosh
- Released: 9 May 2018
- Recorded: 2018
- Studio: Bickram Ghosh Studios
- Genre: Feature film soundtrack
- Length: 5:15
- Label: SVF
- Producer: Bickram Ghosh

Singles from Guptodhone Sandhane
- 1. "Guptodhon History Rap" Released: 27 April 2018; 2. "Rangiye Diye Jao" Released: 9 May 2018

The soundtrack is composed by Bickram Ghosh and lyrics by Shubhendu Das Munshi. The song "Rangiye Diye Jao" originally composed by Rabindranath Tagore, was reinterpreted by Bickram Ghosh under direction of Dhrubo Banerjee.

Track list
No.	Title	Lyrics	Music	Singer	Length
1.	"Guptodhon History Rap" (Backing Vocal and Efx Voice: Daliya Maity Banerjee)	Shubhendu Das Munshi	Bickram Ghosh	Bickram Ghosh	2:34
2.	"Rangiye Diye Jao" (Music reinterpretation by: Bickram Ghosh)	Rabindranath Tagore	Song originally composed by: Rabindranath Tagore	Iman Chakraborty	2:41
Total length:					5:15

== Reception ==
Arghya Bandyopadhyay of Anandabazar Patrika gave it a rating of 6 out of 10. Firstpost rated it 3 out of 5 saying "The best thing about the film is its simplicity. The makers do not have any illusions of grandeur, they know exactly the kind of film they are making, they know their audiences in and out and they customise their offering accordingly. A critic from Sangbad Pratidin reviewed the film and mentioned it as a well woven story with proper depictions of the Bengali culture.

== Sequel ==
A sequel to this movie titled Durgeshgorer Guptodhon, with the same lead cast and director, was released on 24 May 2019. A second sequel was released on 30 September 2022 named Karnasubarner Guptodhon. Another sequel is scheduled to release in 2026 titled Saptadingar Guptodhon.
