= Byomkesh Gotro =

- Theatrical release poster
- Directed by: Arindam Sil
- Screenplay by: Padmanabha Dasgupta; Arindam Sil
- Story by: Saradindu Bandopadhyay
- Produced by: Shrikant Mohta; Mahendra Soni
- Starring: Abir Chatterjee; Rahul Banerjee; Sohini Sarkar; Priyanka Sarkar; Arjun Chakraborty
- Cinematography: Subhankar Bhar
- Edited by: Sanglap Bhowmick
- Music by: Bickram Ghosh
- Production company: Shree Venkatesh Films
- Distributed by: Shree Venkatesh Films
- Release date: 12 October 2018
- Running time: 136 minutes
- Country: India
- Language: Bengali

Byomkesh Gotro is a Bengali-language detective thriller film directed by Arindam Sil and based on a Byomkesh Bakshi story Rakter Daag by Sharadindu Bandyopadhyay. This film is produced by Shrikant Mohta and Mahendra Soni under the banner of Shree Venkatesh Films and it was released on 12 October 2018.

== Plot ==
Satyakam, a young boy comes to Byomkesh in Kolkata and introduces himself as the son of a business magnate from Mussourie. He confesses that he is a womaniser by nature. He invites Byomkesh to come to Mussoorie because he feels that his life is under threat. When Byomkesh reaches Mussoorie, he finds that Satyakam was murdered mysteriously. Boymkesh starts an investigation which reveals a dark history of Satyakam's family.

== Cast ==
- Abir Chatterjee as Byomkesh Bakshi
- Sohini Sarkar as Satyabati
- Rahul Banerjee as Ajit
- Anjan Dutt as Ushapati Das
- Arjun Chakraborty as Satyakam Das
- Priyanka Sarkar as Emily
- Harsh Chhaya as DSP Purandhar Pandey
- Anindita Bose
- Sauraseni Maitra as Chumki
- Bibriti Chatterjee as Meera
- Arindam Sil as (Cameo)
- Indrasish Roy as (Cameo)
- Baisakhi Marjit as Suchitra, Satyakam's mother
- Joydip Kundu
- Surendra Bhandari as mahadev
