= Sourav Das (actor) =

Indian actor (born 1989)

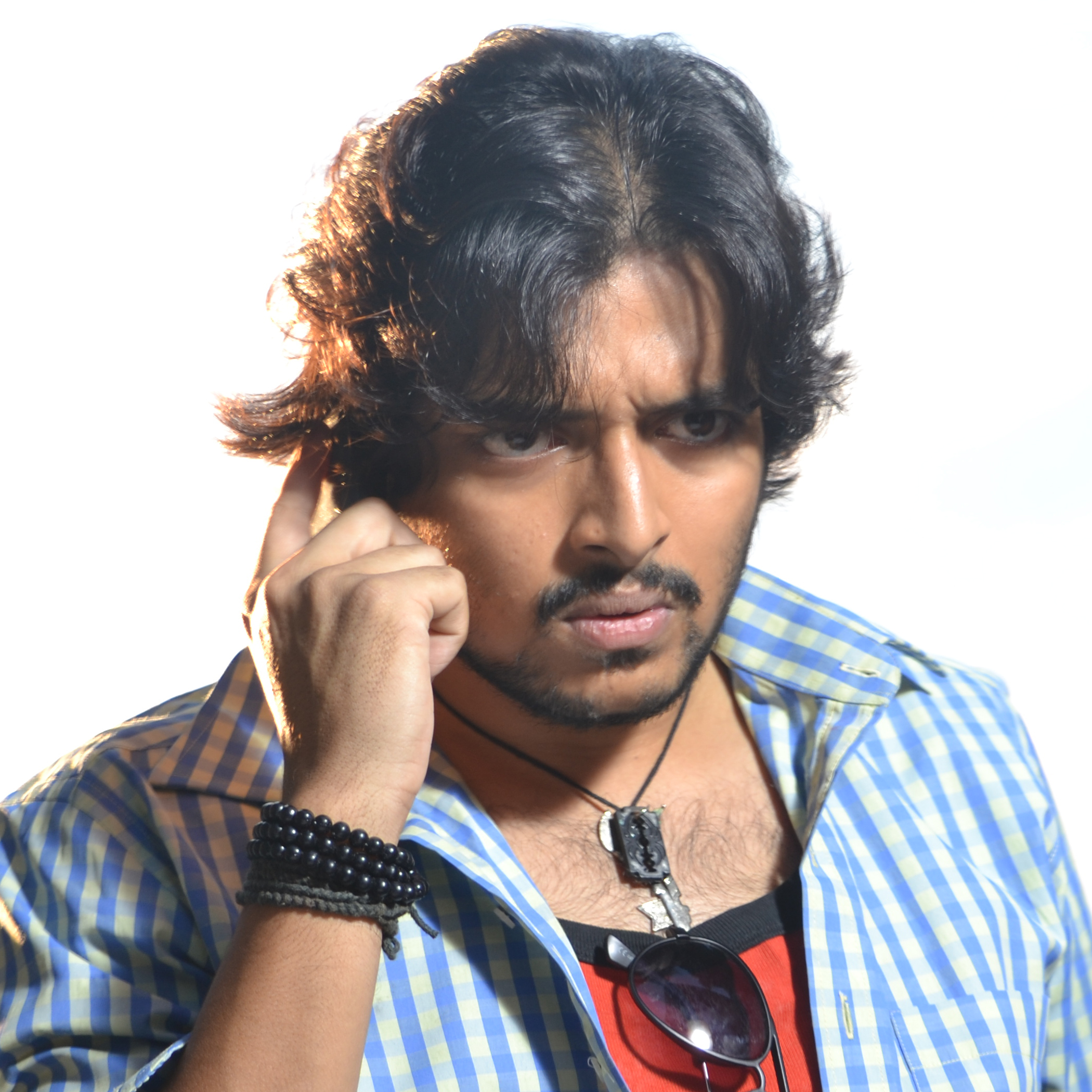
- Sourav in an interview
- Born: 21 January 1989 (age 37)
- Education: South Point School
- Occupation: Actor
- Spouse: Darshana Banik (m. 2023)
- Awards: Films and Frames Digital Film Awards (2020)

Sourav Das (or sometimes spelled Saurav Das) is an Indian actor, presenter, comedian, and theater director in Bengali television, cinema and theatre. He is best known for Dum Dum Digha Digha, Bolo Dugga Maiki and for his roles in the web series "Montu Pilot", "Charitraheen – Seasons 1, 2, 3" and "Rahasya Romancha – Season 3".

== Early life and career ==
He graduated from South Point High School in Kolkata. Then, he joined theater and later started his acting career in the Zee Bangla TV series Boyei Gelo, in which he played Birsa Basak, the younger brother of Arjun (the hero of the series). He made his Bollywood film debut with Kuchh Bheege Alfaaz directed by Onir. He has worked with acclaimed Bengali film directors like Anjan Dutt, Arindam Sil, Birsa Dasgupta, Kamaleshwar Mukherjee, and Raj Chakraborty. He made his debut as a playback singer in Zee Bangla Cinema Originals, Chore Chore Mastuto Bhai. Das married to actress Darshana Banik on 15 December 2023.

== Filmography ==
- Aashiqui (2015)
- Guti Malhar (2016)
- Dum Dum Digha Digha (2016)
- Gangster (2016)
- Guti Malhar Er Atithi (2017)
- One Night Stand (2017)
- Bolo Dugga Maiki (2017)
- Good Night City (2018)
- Ka Kha Ga Gha (2018)
- Reunion (2018)
- Teen Cup Cha (2018)
- Chore Chore Mastuto Bhai (2019)
- Finally Bhalobasha (2019)
- Sweater (2019)
- Ke Tumi Nandini (2019)
- Wrong Number (2019)
- Felunather Marksheet (2019)
- Bhalobashar Sohor (2019)
- Prem Amar 2 (2019)
- Teen Bindu (2019)
- Adda (2019)
- Kora Pak (2020)
- Archie (2020)
- Cheeni (2020)
- Pratidwandi (2021)
- Olpo Holeo Sotti (2021)
- Harano Prapti (2020)
- Iskabon (2022)
- Rish (2022)
- Bishakto Manush (2022)
- Kolkata Chalantika (2022)
- Karnasubarner Guptodhon (2022)
- Hridoypur (2022)
- Abar Bibaho Obhijaan (2023)
- Boomerang (2024)
- Bharga (2024)
- Kohinoor (2024)
- Turuper Tass (2025)
- Dashoi June (2025)
- Girgiti (2025)
- Nana he (2025)
- Mrigaya: The Hunt (2025)
- Jhor (2025)
- The Bengal Files (2025)
- The Academy of Fine Arts (2025)
- Rappa Roy & Full Stop Dot Com (2025)

== Web series ==
- Gariahater Ganglords
- Bou Keno Psycho
- Charitraheen
- Astey Ladies
- Ore Maa
- Apaharan
- Charitraheen 2
- Montu Pilot
- Kamini
- Charitraheen 3
- Break Up Story
- Rahasya Romancho Series (Season 3)
- Pabitra Puppies
- Canvas
- Katakuti (2022)
- Picasso (2023)
- Paashbalish (2024)

== Television ==
Year	Show	Role	Channel	Ref.
2009–2014	Maa....Tomay Chara Ghum Ashena	Rik Chatterjee	Star Jalsha	
2012	Boyei Gelo	Birsha	Zee Bangla	
2015	Kojagori	Kartick Mitra	Zee Bangla	
2013	Raage Anuraage	Kartik	Zee Bangla	
2014	Thik Jeno Love Story	Kripan	Star Jalsha	
2015	Jarowar Jhumko	Baju	Zee Bangla	
2015	I Laugh You	Contestant	Star Jalsha	
2015	Potol Kumar Ganwala	Bishtu	Star Jalsha	
2015–2017	Punyi Pukur	Sarbajit Majumdar; Chhuti's husband	Star Jalsha	
2015	Amra Na Ora	Host	Star Jalsha	
2017	Swapno Udaan		Star Jalsha	
2017	Apur Sangsar	Comedian	Zee Bangla	
2017	Dadagiri Unlimited 7	Contestant	Zee Bangla	
2019	Zee Bangla Football League	Participant	Zee Bangla	
2019	Start Music	Host	Star Jalsha	
2019-2021	Soudaminir Sansar	Dhananjay Mukherjee aka Dhana	Zee Bangla	
2021	Didi No. 1	Contestant; Temporary host	Zee Bangla	
2021	Gole-Male-Gol	Host	Zee Bangla	
2026	Raandhuni Na Kaanduni	Contestant	Sony Aath	
2026	Bigg Boss Bangla 3	Contestant	Star Jalsha	

== Awards ==
Year	Award	Category
2016	Star Jalsha Parivaar Awards	Best Anchor
2019	Hoichoi Awards	Series Star Of the Year
2020	Films and Frames Digital Film Awards	OTT Most Promising Face
2021	Hoichoi Awards	Breakthrough Performance of The Year
