= Chaalchitra Ekhon =

2024 Indian Bengali-language film

Chalchitra Ekhon
- Theatrical release poster
- Directed by: Anjan Dutt
- Written by: Anjan Dutt
- Produced by: Anjan Dutt; Neel Dutta
- Starring: Bidipta Chakraborty; Sawon Chakraborty; Anjan Dutt
- Cinematography: Pravatendu Mondal
- Edited by: Arghyakamal Mitra
- Music by: Anjan Dutt
- Release date: 10 May 2024
- Running time: 92 minutes
- Country: India
- Language: Bengali

Chalchitra Ekhon is a 2024 Indian Bengali-language drama film written and directed by Anjan Dutt. At the 72nd National Film Awards it won the Best Bengali Feature Film.

== Plot ==
Young, angry theatre activist Ranjan Duttis unsure of his future, frustrated by the intellectual and political limitations of Calcutta, and at odds with his theatre group. He prioritizes individual liberty over collective communist ideology and dreams of moving to Berlin.Amid this inner turmoil, Ranjan meets Kunal Sen when he gets cast in Sen’s 1981 film Chaalchitra.

== Cast ==
- Anjan Dutt as Kunal Sen (based on Mrinal Sen)
- Sawon Chakraborty as Ranjan Dutta (based on Anjan Dutt)
- Bidipta Chakraborty as Mita Sen (based on Geeta Sen)
- Konkona Haldar as Sheela (based on Sreela Majumdar)
- Suprabhat Dey as J K Madhavan (based on K. K. Mahajan)
- Subhasish Mukherjee as production manager
- Sekhar Das as Ujjwal Dutt (based on Utpal Dutt)
- Rupankar Bagchi as Aroop Kumar (based on Anup Kumar)

== Release ==
The film was theatrically released on 10 May 2024 and had a simultaneous digital streaming release on Hoichoi.

== Reception ==
Poorna Banarjee of The Times of India gave a rating of 3.5 of 5 and wrote that "However, in the course of the film it seems like Ranjan's character is designed to absolve the director of his younger self's decisions." Shantanu Ray Chaudhuri of The Telegraph stated, "the mentor-protégé relationship is one of great dramatic potential."

== Award ==
Year	Award	Category	Result	Ref.
2026	72nd National Film Awards	Best Bengali film	Won	
2025	Filmfare Awards Bangla	Best Film (Critics) and Best Actor	Won	
2025	Critics Choice Film Awards	Best Supporting Actor	Won	
2024	Dhaka International Film Festival	Best Actor Award (Asian Film Competition Section)	Won	
2024	Kolkata International Film Festival	Special Jury Award	Won	
