= Ishaa Saha =

Indian Bengali actress

- Born: Kolkata, West Bengal, India
- Education: University of Calcutta
- Occupation: Actress
- Years active: 2016–present

Ishaa Saha is an Indian actress who mainly works in Bengali cinema. She started her career with Bengali television and made her film debut in 2017 as a lead in Projapoti Biskut, directed by Anindya Chatterjee. She has acted in films directed by filmmaker Dhrubo Banerjee.

== Early life and education ==
Saha was born in Kolkata into a Bengali family. She completed her Bachelor of Laws degree in 2015 from Surendranath Law College.

== Career ==
Ishaa started her career as a television artist in 2016 with Star Jalsha's Jhanjh Lobongo Phool, playing the lead character, Lobongo. She later made her film debut in 2017 with the family drama Projapoti Biskut, directed by Anindya Chatterjee, which was critically and commercially successful. She received praise for her performance and won the Critics' Award for Best Actor (Female) at the 3rd Filmfare Awards East. In 2018, Saha played the role of Jhinuk, a girl next door, alongside Abir Chatterjee and Arjun Chakrabarty as the female protagonist in the Guptodhon franchise (Guptodhoner Sandhane (2018) and Durgeshgorer Guptodhon (2019)). Saha gained wider recognition for her performance in Sweater, the film also turned out to be a box office success. Both Sweater and Durgeshgorer Guptodhon are in the 'Top Rated Bengali Movies Of 2019' list. Next she starred in Dhrubo Banerjee's Golondaaj, opposite to Dev. In 2021 she acted in a number of films including Karnasubarner Guptodhon and Kachher Manush. Karnasubarner Guptodhon was a hit at the box office and went on to become one of the highest-grossing Bengali films of all time, grossing ₹98 million. In 2023, she starred in the musical romantic dramas Mitthye Premer Gaan and Ghore Pherar Gaan.

== Filmography ==
Key
†	Denotes films that have not yet been released

Year	Title	Role	Director	Production	Ref
2017	Projapoti Biskut	Shaon	Anindya Chatterjee	Windows Production	
2018	Guptodhoner Sandhane	Jhinuk	Dhrubo Banerjee	Shree Venkatesh Films	
2019	Sweater	Tulika alias Tuku	Shieladitya Moulik	PSS Entertainments, Pramod Films, P&P Entertainment	
2019	Durgeshgorer Guptodhon	Jhinuk	Dhrubo Banerjee	Shree Venkatesh Films	
2019	Buro Sadhu	Shweta	Vik	Wisemonk Creative, DNA Entertainment Networks	
2020	Detective	Sudhamukhi	Joydip Mukherjee	Shree Venkatesh Films	
2021	Torulatar Bhoot	Kamalkali	Deb Roy	Green Motion Pictures	
2021	Golondaaj	Kamalini	Dhrubo Banerjee	Shree Venkatesh Films	
2022	Mahananda	Mahal	Arindam Sil	Friends Communication	
2022	Sahobashe	Tista	Anjan Kanjilal	Mojotale Entertainments	
2022	Kolkata Chalantika	Tumpa	Pavel	Baba Bhootnath Entertainment	
2022	Kachher Manush	Aalo	Pathikrit Basu	Dev Entertainment Ventures	
2022	Karnasubarner Guptodhon	Jhinuk	Dhrubo Banerjee	Shree Venkatesh Films	
2023	Mitthye Premer Gaan	Anwesha Ray	Paroma Neotia	Neostories Productions	
2023	Ghore Pherar Gaan	Tora	Aritra Sen	Eskay Movies	
2023	Ektu Sore Bosun	Piu	Kamaleshwar Mukherjee	Big Cat Films	
2025	Oporichito	Riya Ghoshal	Joydip Mukherjee	Eskay Movies	
2025	Check in Cheque Out	Namrata Mitra	Satrajit Sen	Techno India Group, Novotel	
2025	The Eken: Benaras e Bibhishika	Damini	Joydip Mukherjee	Hoichoi Studios	
2025	Lawho Gouranger Naam Rey	Rai	Srijit Mukherji	SVF, Dag Creative Media	
2026	Saptadingar Guptodhon	Jhinuk	Dhrubo Banerjee	SVF	
2026	Tejpata †	TBA	Souvik Kundu	Zee Bangla Cinema Originals	
2027	Jadukar Satyacharon		Sayantan Ghosal		

== Television ==
Year	Title	Channel	Role	Production House
2016	Jhanjh Lobongo Phool	Star Jalsha	Lobongo	SVF

== Mahalaya ==
Year	Title	Channel	Role
2026	Ashubhonashini Trinayani	Zee Bangla	Sita

== Web series ==
Year	Title	Director	Platform	Character Name	Production
2018	Japani Toy (Season 1)	Sourav Chakraborty	Hoichoi	Kinkini	SVF
2019	Japani Toy (Season 2)	Soumik Chattopadhyay	Hoichoi	Kinkini	SVF
2019	Daab Chingri	Sudeep Das	ZEE5	Sohini	Nideas
2019	Bhalobashar Shohor (Story:Kolkatar Kobitara)	Abhijit Guha & Sudeshna Roy	ZEE5	Malini	Roadshow Films
2020	Mafia	Birsa Dasgupta	ZEE5	Ananya	Roadshow Films & Eskay Movies
2021	Boyfriends & Girlfriends	Suvankar Paul	Hoichoi	Amrita	SVF
2021	Indu	Sayantan Ghosal	Hoichoi	Indu	Missing Screw
2022	Gora	Sayantan Ghosal	Hoichoi	Somlata	Missing Screw
2022	Hello! Remember me?	Abhimanyu Mukherjee	Hoichoi	Malini	Missing Screw
2023	Indu 2	Abhimanyu Mukherjee	Hoichoi	Indu	Missing Screw
2023	Antormahal	Abhrajit Sen	Hoichoi	Riti	SVF
2024	Paashbalish	Korok Murmu	ZEE5	Aanchal	Mahabahu Motion Pictures
2025	Indu 3	Ayan Chakraborti	Hoichoi	Indu	Missing Screw
2026	BB Bakshi	Joydip Mukherjee	Fridaay	Binodbala	Camellia
2026	Advocate Achinta Aich 3	Joydip Mukherjee	Hoichoi	Debjani	SVF
