= Indu (TV series) =

Indian Bengali mystery thriller series

- Release poster
- Created by: Sahana Dutta
- Written by: Sahana Dutta - Season 1,2; Ayan Chakraborti - Season 3
- Screenplay by: Sahana Dutta - Season 1,2; Ayan Chakraborti - Season 3
- Directed by: Sayantan Ghosal - Season 1; Abhimanyu Mukherjee -Season 2; Ayan Chakraborti - Season 3
- Creative director: Sahana Dutta
- Starring: Ishaa Saha; Suhotra Mukhopadhyay
- Theme music composer: Binit Ranjan Moitra
- Composer: Binit Ranjan Moitra
- Country of origin: India
- Original language: Bengali
- No. of seasons: 3
- No. of episodes: 23

Production
- Executive producers: Mahendra Soni; Srikanth Mohta
- Producers: Sahana Dutta; Rohit Samanta
- Production location: Kolkata
- Cinematography: Sudipta Majumdar - Season 1; Anujit Kundu - Season 2,3
- Editors: Sanglap Bhowmik - Season 1; Rabiranjan Maitra - Season 2,3
- Camera setup: Single-camera
- Running time: 18 - 37 minutes
- Production company: Missing Screw

Original release
- Release: 2021 – present

Indu is an Indian Bengali mystery thriller drama web series streaming on Hoichoi. Written and created by Sahana Dutta, the series stars Ishaa Saha in the titular role. Suhotra Mukhopadhyay, Manali Manisha Dey and Chandraniv Mukhopadhyay play other pivotal roles. It revolves around Indu, a newly-wed wife, who unfurls the dark secrets and mysteries of her new family.

Produced by Sahana Dutta under the banner of "Missing Screw", three seasons of the series has streamed till date on the Bengali OTT platform Hoichoi. Dutta also worked as the creative director of the series. Sayantan Ghosal directed the first season, Abhimanyu Mukherjee directed the second season while the third season was written and directed by Ayan Chakraborti. Subrata Banik was the art director.

== Overview ==
In the first season, Indu gets married into a bonedi family residing in their ancestral mansion. But soon she realises that there is something mysterious about the house and the members when she found out poisonous Datura leaves inside the twatter machh and stepped on a bowl of blood while entering the house instead of the usual vermillion liquid. The mystery gets more intensified after the mysterious death of Laboni. She started her own investigation since the family tried to hush her death as an accident. Her search revealed that every member of the family is a suspect and carries a motive.

The second season picks from the cliffhanger where the first season ended; Sujato asks Indu if she would be able to solve the mystery and find the culprit. As she further investigates the death, Indu comes to know about the family's dark past and a pattern of violence that has affected the family for generations. Mysteries become more intensified as Datura seeds are found inside a pumpkin and her husband Sougato dies mysteriously. After a frenzy of events, Poushali revealed that she along with Koushali tried to scare Indu away, from the very first day. Charu's dead body is found at the courtyard, which paves way for the third season, to search for Sougato and Charu's murderer.

== Cast ==
- Ishaa Saha as Indrani a.k.a. Indu
- Suhotra Mukhopadhyay as Sujato, Indu's brother-in-law
- Manali Manisha Dey as Laboni, Sujato's estranged wife
- Chandraniv Mukhopadhyay as Sougato, Indu's husband
- Manasi Sinha as Annada Dasgupta
- Payel De as Khushi, Indu's sister-in-law
- Mimi Dutta as Poushali, Indu's sister-in-law
- Judhajit Sarkar as Mihir, Indu's brother-in-law
- Tanika Basu as Mili
- Purbasha Roy
- Anuradha Mukherjee as Charu
- Satakshi Nandy
- Shoumo Banerjee
- Tarun Chakraborty

== Episodes ==
Series	Episodes	Originally released
1	8	22 October 2021
2	8	20 January 2023
3	7	27 September 2025

=== Season 1 (2021) ===
No.	Title	Directed by	Written by	Original release date
1	"Dodhi Mangal"	Sayantan Ghosal	Sahana Dutta	October 22, 2021
2	"Shajabo Jotoney"	Sayantan Ghosal	Sahana Dutta	October 22, 2021
3	"Bashor Ghawr"	Sayantan Ghosal	Sahana Dutta	October 22, 2021
4	"Kaalratri"	Sayantan Ghosal	Sahana Dutta	October 22, 2021
5	"Phulshojya"	Sayantan Ghosal	Sahana Dutta	October 22, 2021
6	"Bish pata"	Sayantan Ghosal	Sahana Dutta	October 22, 2021
7	"Biswash - Sandeho"	Sayantan Ghosal	Sahana Dutta	October 22, 2021
8	"Bhalo Meye, Bhalo Na"	Sayantan Ghosal	Sahana Dutta	October 22, 2021

=== Season 2 (2023) ===
No.	Title	Directed by	Written by	Original release date
1	"Parbe Sherlock Holmes?"	Abhimanyu Mukherjee	Sahana Dutta	January 20, 2023
2	"Rohoshyer Gawrbhey Rohoshyo"	Abhimanyu Mukherjee	Sahana Dutta	January 20, 2023
3	"Sandeho Rog"	Abhimanyu Mukherjee	Sahana Dutta	January 20, 2023
4	"Post-mortem"	Abhimanyu Mukherjee	Sahana Dutta	January 20, 2023
5	"Dhnowa"	Abhimanyu Mukherjee	Sahana Dutta	January 20, 2023
6	"Devil Maane Bhoy"	Abhimanyu Mukherjee	Sahana Dutta	January 20, 2023
7	"O Bhoy Payena"	Abhimanyu Mukherjee	Sahana Dutta	January 20, 2023
8	"Shesh Tobu Shesh Noy"	Abhimanyu Mukherjee	Sahana Dutta	January 20, 2023

=== Season 3 (2025) ===
No.	Title	Directed by	Written by	Original release date
1	"Dhadha"	Ayan Chakraborti	Ayan Chakraborti	September 27, 2025
2	"Kanak Bhringraj"	Ayan Chakraborti	Ayan Chakraborti	September 27, 2025
3	"Sondeho"	Ayan Chakraborti	Ayan Chakraborti	September 27, 2025
4	"Onneshon"	Ayan Chakraborti	Ayan Chakraborti	September 27, 2025
5	"Chhol Kopot"	Ayan Chakraborti	Ayan Chakraborti	September 27, 2025
6	"Jobonika Poton"	Ayan Chakraborti	Ayan Chakraborti	September 27, 2025
7	"Swikarokti"	Ayan Chakraborti	Ayan Chakraborti	September 27, 2025

== Production ==
=== Announcement ===
The second season of Indu was announced by Hoichoi along with 25 other of its upcoming shows on 21 September 2022. The release date for the second season was announced as 20 January 2023 with a poster on 6 January 2023.

In September 2024, the makers announced that the third season of Indu is in the pre production stage and filming will commence soon. On 28 February, Indu 3 was officially announced by Shree Venkatesh Films as its Hoichoi venture among the "Golper Parbon 1432" announcements.

=== Filming ===
The shooting of the second season was scheduled to begin in August 2022. Owing to pre production issues, it was delayed and filming started on 11 November 2022. Most of the filmography of both the seasons have been done at Belgachia Rajbari in North Kolkata.

The third season of the series, Indu 3 was announced with an announcement video in August 2025. The filming for Indu 3 was scheduled to start in September 2023, but was delayed owing to date issues of Ishaa Saha. After multiple production delays, the filming for the third season was started on 10 August 2025 at Belgachia Rajbari.

=== Marketing ===
The trailer of the first season was released on 11 October 2021. The trailer of Indu 2; the second season of the series, was released on 8 January 2023. It revealed that the story will continue from the point where Sougato asked Indu if she would be able to solve the mysteries, which get more intensified as poisonous Datura seeds are found inside a whole pumpkin, after a poisonous leaf was found inside a gifted fish in the first season. The trailer for the third and final season was released on 21 September 2025.

== Reception ==
=== Critical reception ===
==== Season 1 ====
Shaheen Irani of OTTplay rated the series 3.5/5 stars and wrote "Indu is not your regular damsel-in-distress story. While it begins like that, the story unfolds beautifully. It is among those Bengali web series that take its own time to develop but leave a mark once the setup is clear. By the end of it all, Ishaa Saha becomes quite the attraction, right after Suhotra Mukhopadhyay's." She also applauded Chandraniv and Payal's performances, the mystery factor maintained around Laboni's character and the non sexual spark between Isha and Suhotra during their on screen moments.

A critic from Binged reviewed the series and opined "On the surface, Indu is a suspense drama, with a murder, several attempts to murder, an unhinged woman and a mystery woman thrown into the mix. But scratch beneath the surface, and the stench of misogyny and patriarchy pervades the plot in every scene." Ishaa's flawless portrayal as Indu, Suhotra's screen presence, the world building, cinematography and the background score were praised. But the slow pace and not so great suspense build up were criticized.

==== Season 2 ====
Agnivo Niyogi of The Telegraph reviewed the series and wrote "The show holds on to the suspense, packs in a few twists and ends with yet another cliffhanger. Where it falls short of is in threading the incidents together and coming up with answers to questions raised in Season 1." He criticized the slow pace, dragging on of the suspense and a comparatively weak storyline than the first season.

Shamayita Chakraborty of OTTplay rated the series 3/5 stars and highlighted "It builds suspense, presents a stellar star cast, endlessly beats around the bushes, and finally doesn’t reach its resolution. Since the makers and writers hold back most of the explanations, the season becomes bland despite the garnishing of acting, et al." She applauded the effortless chemistry between Ishaa and Suhotra and mentioned that as the only reason to watch the series. She criticized the excessive stretching of the storyline which makes the lack of content evident.

Archi Sengupta of Leisure Byte rated the series 4/5 stars and opined "Indu 2 is another great addition to the genre that keeps the audience hooked to the storyline. Although you don’t get the answers to some of the biggest questions, you are given an inkling to make up your own minds until the next season (hopefully) answers them." She praised Ishaa's performance but bemoaned the mystery for getting convoluted with every episode and criticized the makers for dragging the story and killing more people in the lieu of creating a new season.

==== Season 3 ====
Agnivo Niyogi of The Telegraph reviewed the series and stated "The new season is sluggish but delivers a resolution that feels earned. This season doesn’t leave things dangling. It ties back the loose threads from past seasons." He praised Ishaa Saha for keeping the show together, the more space provided to the supporting cast, Judhajit Sarkar as Indu's brother-in-law, Suhotro's wildcard acting his emotional chemistry with Ishaa. But he bemoaned the pacing of the series as "Some scenes drag far longer than they should, especially in the middle episodes where conversations keep circling the same points."

Archi Sengupta of Leisure Byte rated the series 3/5 stars and opined "Overall, a good season. Ishaa Saha carries this series on her shoulders, and she’s, as always, great. From her mannerisms to her charms, the actor does a good job of holding on to our interest." She praised the usage of all the characters that helped in tying all the seasons together, several callback moments to recall different things that will keep the viewers interested and the ending. Although she bemoaned the slow pacing of the final season and mentioned that certain unnecessary sequences slow down the series, mounting the audience's annoyance.

== Remake ==
A OTTplay report in July 2022 said that Disney+ Hotstar has obtained the remake rights of the series. It was going to be remade in Hindi. Later, it was declared that Indu would be remade in Telugu instead of Hindi. Avika Gor was roped in to play the titular role in the series. The Telugu remake was titled Vadhuvu. The teaser was released on 14 November 2023 and the trailer was released on 24 November 2023. It streamed on Disney+ Hotstar on 8 December 2023.
