= Durgeshgorer Guptodhon =

2019 Bengali adventure mystery film

- Durgeshgorer Guptodhon
- Directed by: Dhrubo Banerjee
- Written by: Dhrubo Banerjee; Subhendu Dasmunsi
- Produced by: Mahendra Soni; Shrikant Mohta
- Starring: Abir Chatterjee; Arjun Chakrabarty; Ishaa Saha; Kamaleswar Mukherjee; Arindam Sil; Kaushik Sen
- Cinematography: Soumik Haldar
- Edited by: Sanjib Kumar Dutta
- Music by: Bickram Ghosh
- Production company: Shree Venkatesh Films (SVF Pvt Lmt)
- Distributed by: Svf
- Release date: 24 May 2019 (India)
- Running time: 133 minutes
- Country: India
- Language: Bengali

Durgeshgorer Guptodhon (lit. 'The treasure of Durgeshgor') is a 2019 Indian Bengali-language action-adventure film directed by Dhrubo Banerjee and produced by Shrikant Mohta and Mahendra Soni. It is a sequel to Guptodhoner Sandhane and the second film in the Sona Da franchise. This film was released on 24 May 2019 under the banner of SVF Entertainment and it was highest grossing movie of 2019.

== Plot ==
Professor Subarna Sen, aka Sonada, a professor of history, along with Abir and Jhinuk decide to visit one of Sonada's student's ancestral mansion at Durgeshgarh. The ancestor of this student, Durgagati Deb Roy, was an erstwhile zamindar and a renowned artist of Bengal. There is a myth that runs in the family that they had once received a massive treasure from famous King Krishnachandra Roy after the Battle of Plassey. Presently all traces and trails of it have been lost. Sonada along with Abir and Jhinuk join the festival of Durga Puja in that mansion and stumble upon the lost clues that may lead them in unearthing one of the greatest treasures of Bengal.

== Cast ==
- Abir Chatterjee as Professor Subarna Sen aka. Sona da
- Arjun Chakrabarty as Abirlal Roy/Abir
- Ishaa Saha as Jhinuk Majumdar
- Anindya Chatterjee as Pinakpani Deb Roy
- Kaushik Sen as Trishulpani Deb Roy
- Aryann Bhowmik as Dambarupani Deb Roy aka Dumble
- Lily Chakravarty as Pishima
- June Maliah as Rini Boudi
- Debjani Chattopadhyay as Moni Boudi
- Kharaj Mukherjee as Aparup da
- Arindam Sil as Subir Roy
- Kamaleswar Mukherjee as Akhilesh Majumdar
- Baishakhi Marjit as Rai Roy
- Master Bihan Saha Dalal as Kucho
- Amit Saha in a cameo role
- Lama Halder in a cameo role

== Soundtrack ==
Durgeshgorer Guptodhon

Soundtrack album by Bickram Ghosh
- Released: May 2019
- Recorded: 2019
- Studio: Bickram Ghosh Studios
- Genre: Feature film soundtrack
- Length: 16:53
- Label: SVF
- Producer: Bickram Ghosh

The background score and the soundtracks are composed by Bickram Ghosh and lyrics are penned down by Shubhendu Das Munshi.

Track list
No.	Title	Singer	Length
1.	"History Rap Vol. 2"	Bickram Ghosh	3:39
2.	"Maa Go Tui"	Manomay Bhattacharyya, Somchanda Bhattacharya	1:59
3.	"Doob De Re Mon"	Nirmalya Roy	2:15
4.	"Kolabou Gaan"	Nirmalya Roy	1:51
5.	"Durgeshgorer Mashup"	Nirmalya Roy, Iman Chakraborty	2:06
6.	"Dakkhinar Dakhina Pete"	Nirmalya Roy	2:26
7.	"Durga Durgotinashini"	Nirmalya Roy, Iman Chakraborty	3:57
Total length:			16:53

== Reception ==
Following the trivia of the previous film Guptodhoner Sandhane, Durgeshgorer Guptodhon was also a box office blockbuster and the highest grossing Bengali film of 2019. The movie received mostly positive reviews from critics. Upam Buzarbaruah of The Times of India gave it a rating of 3.5 out of 5. Antara Mazumdar of Anandabazar Patrika gave it a rating of 6.5 out of 10. Firstpost's editor Bhaskar Chattopadhyay rated the movie 3 out of 5, saying "Durgeshgorer Guptodhon, like his previous film, too tells the adventurous story of the trio, who has by now captured the imagination of Bengali audiences, both young and old. Flavored in a dizzying marinade of history and lore, and garnished with ample doses of puzzles, riddles, ciphers, and hidden codes, it is one of the more intelligent Bengali films in recent times. The puzzles seem neither fake nor forced, the clues are in fact quite exciting to decode, and the overall breezy nature of the storytelling ensures that even the strictest of critics have a jolly good time. I know I did".

== Sequel ==
A sequel titled Karnasubarner Guptodhon was released on 30 September 2022, with Abir Chatterjee, Arjun Chakraborty and Ishaa Saha reprising their roles, directed by Dhrubo Banerjee.
