= Paashbalish =

Indian Bengali-language web-series

- Promotional poster for Paashbalish
- Genre: Romantic Thriller
- Written by: Prosenjit Banerjee
- Screenplay by: Arkadeep Mallika Nath; Abhijit Mallick
- Directed by: Korok Murmu
- Starring: Ishaa Saha; Suhotra Mukhopadhyay; Saurav Das; Rishi Kaushik; Sankar Debnath; Arindam Saha
- Country of origin: India
- Original language: Bengali
- No. of episodes: 7

Production
- Producer: Bijaya Chaubay
- Editor: Pronoy Dasgupta
- Production company: Mahababu Motion Pictures

Original release
- Network: ZEE5
- Release: 10 May 2024

Paashbalish is Bengali Romantic thriller web-series starring Ishaa Saha, Suhotra Mukhopadhyay, Saurav Das, Rishi Kaushik and Sankar Debnath. It is directed Korok Murmu and produced by Bijaya Chaubay for ZEE5. The series premiered on 10 May 2024.

== Plot ==
The story is set in India-Bangladesh border areas in West Bengal, often referred to as the Teen Bigha Corridor. Two orphans, friends as kids but separated by fate as they grow up, get entangled in an age-old rivalry between two indigenous groups in the area – the Bengalis and ‘Paharbonghis’.

== Cast ==
- Ishaa Saha as Aanchal
- Suhotra Mukhopadhyay as Chandu
- Saurav Das as Swadesh
- Rishi Kaushik as Inspector Adhiraj
- Sankar Debnath as Mahadev
- Arindam Saha as Bodoh Babu Sub Inspector Sandeep Dhara

== Marketing ==
The trailer of Paashbalish was released on 23 April 2024.

== Music ==
The show used a fresh rendition of Jasimuddin and S.D. Burman’s famous song Rongila Re to mount their promotions. The song was recreated by Mrinmoy Sanyal and sung by Snigdhajit Bhowmik.

== Reception ==
Paashbalish received mixed reviews. OTTplay commented, "Ishaa Saha, Suhotro Mukhopadhyay, and Saurav Das’ thriller Paashbalish fails to make any mark.’
