= Murder in the Hills =

Indian Bengali web series

- Release poster
- Genre: Thriller
- Directed by: Anjan Dutt
- Country of origin: India
- Original language: Bengali
- No. of seasons: 1
- No. of episodes: 8

Production
- Production company: SVF Entertainment

Original release
- Release: 23 July 2021

Murder in the Hills is a Bengali crime thriller web series streaming on the OTT platform hoichoi. The series was released on 23 July 2021. The series is directed by Anjan Dutt, who makes his directorial debut for a web series. This film is loosely based on the storyline of the famous detective novel of Agatha Christie, Murder on the Orient Express.

== Plot ==
Set in Darjeeling, Murder in The Hills is an engrossingly dark story filled with complex multi-layered characters who have their own share of secrets and unwanted truths. The story surrounds around the seemingly natural death of a yesteryear film star, Tony Roy. The death however threatens to expose the dark past of the serene hill station. Amitabha Banerjee, an ambitious investigative journalist, decides to get to the end of the mystery.

== Cast ==
- Anjan Dutt as Tony Roy
- Arjun Chakrabarty as Amitabha Banerjee
- Anindita Bose as Sheela Bose
- Rajdeep Gupta as DSP Subhankar Banerjee
- Sourav Chakraborty as Bijoy Mukherjee
- Sandipta Sen as Dr. Neema Pradhan
- Suprobhat Das as Bob Das
- Rajat Ganguly as Ranjan Ganguly
- Saswati Guhathakurta as Mrs. Rama Roy
- Suhotra Mukhopadhyay as a younger Tony Roy
- Joydip Mukherjee as Mr. Raja Roy

== Episodes ==
Series	Episodes	Originally released
1	8	23 July 2021

== Season 1 (2021) ==
On 23 July 2021 hoichoi released all eight episodes of Murder in the Hills.

== Episodes ==
No.	Title	Directed by	Original release date
1	"Birthday Party"	Anjan Dutt	23 July 2021
2	"Secret Diary"	Anjan Dutt	23 July 2021
3	"Dangerous Bob"	Anjan Dutt	23 July 2021
4	"Kidnap"	Anjan Dutt	23 July 2021
5	"Mysterious Cellphone"	Anjan Dutt	23 July 2021
6	"Suspicious Sheela"	Anjan Dutt	23 July 2021
7	"Showdown"	Anjan Dutt	23 July 2021
8	"Ultimate Truth"	Anjan Dutt	23 July 2021

== Reception ==
Upam Buzarbaruah of Times of India writes, "Murder in the Hills has an Agatha Christie-esque title and premise. And the connection ends there."
