= Ekdin Pratidin =

Indian Bengali television series

- Written by: Aditi Majumdar; Anuja Chatterjee
- Directed by: Anindya Banerjee
- Starring: Aparajita Ghosh Das; Rishi Kaushik; Parambrata Chattopadhyay
- Country of origin: India
- Original language: Bengali
- No. of seasons: 1
- No. of episodes: 564

Production
- Producer: Shantasree Sarkar
- Production location: Kolkata
- Production company: Beyond Reels

Original release
- Network: Zee Bangla
- Release: January 31, 2005 – 2007

Ekdin Pratidin is a Drama Bengali television serial which aired on Zee Bangla.

== Cast ==
- Rishi Kaushik as Indranath Laha aka Indra
- Aparajita Ghosh Das as Mohor Laha (née Ganguly)
- Bulbuli Panja / Monami Ghosh as Barsha
- Parambrata Chattopadhyay as Brata
- Sayantani Ghosh / Sohini Sarkar as Koyel
- Baishaki Marjit as Mohor's mother
- Basudeb Mukherjee as Mohor's father
- Sudipa Basu as Sudipa
- Biswajit Chakraborty as Biswajit
- Rita Dutta Chakraborty as Brata's mother
- Debshankar Halder as Benu
- Debopriyo Bagchi a.k.a Bubble Sandy
- Mithu Chakraborty as Indra's mother
- Santu Mukherjee as Indra's father
- Kanchan Mallick as Sushil
- Anindya Banerjee as Bishu
- Pushpita Mukherjee as Sohini
- Arindam Sil as Rono
- Subhrajit Dutta as Apu
- Kushal Chakraborty as Somendra
- Payel Sarkar as Diya
- Chaitali Dasgupta as Sreeradha Diya's mother
- Rajat Ganguly as Amalendu Diya's father
- Sudipa Chatterjee as Ishita
- Bharat Kaul as Aniruddha
- Saswata Chatterjee as Abhimanyu
- Moumita Gupta as Abhimanyu's mother
- Sanjeev Dasgupta as Shovon
- Indrani Basu as Mallika
- Swarnakamal Dutta as Pola
- Kaushik Chakrabarty as Dipto
- Payel De as Chandryee
- Arunima Ghosh as Poroma
- Rimjhim Mitra as Gunja
- Bobby Chakrabarty as Jojo
- Dulal Lahiri as Gurudev
