= Finally Bhalobasha =

2019 Indian Bengali-language film

Finally Bhalobasa
- Bengali: Finally ভালোবাসা
- Directed by: Anjan Dutt
- Story by: Anjan Dutt
- Starring: Anjan Dutt; Raima Sen; Arjun Chakrabarty; Anirban Bhattacharya; Arindam Sil; Sauraseni Maitra
- Cinematography: Gairik Sarkar
- Edited by: Arghyakamal Mitra
- Music by: Neel Dutt, Sayeem Hasan
- Production company: Shree Venkatesh Films
- Release date: 8 February 2019 (Kolkata)
- Running time: 117 minutes
- Country: India
- Language: Bengali

Finally Bhalobasa (English: "Finally Love", 2019) is an Indian Bengali language anthology film directed by Anjan Dutt. The film includes 3 stories and explores different dimensions of life . The trailer of the film was released in January 2019. The film was theatrically released on 8 February 2019.

== Plot ==
The story is subdivided into three parts. The first part of the story is about an insomniac, depressed wife of a dominating man. The lady finds solace in an employee of her husband, who tries to get her out of the situation. However, he fails in his attempts, and the lady is forced to commit suicide. The second part is about an aged man falling in love with a young woman. The third part is about an HIV patient, who is taken care of by a male nurse, who wins his heart. At the end of the film, it is revealed that all the characters are somehow related. Finally, we discover that the story is not actually divided into parts.

== Cast ==
- Arjun Chakrabarty
- Anjan Dutt
- Raima Sen
- Anirban Bhattacharya
- Arindam Sil
- Sauraseni Maitra
- Sourav Das
- Suprabhat Das
- Focus Tiwari
- Snehasish Prasad Yadav (PS)

== Soundtrack ==
Track listing
No.	Title	Singer	Length
1.	"Chhiley Bondhu"	Neel Dutt	3:02
2.	"Koto Koto Mon"	Madhubanti Bagchi	2:58

== Release ==
The official trailer of the film was unveiled by SVF on 16 January 2019.
