= Gaaner Oparey =

Indian Bengali musical TV serial

- Title screen
- Genre: Romance
- Created by: Rituparno Ghosh
- Screenplay by: Rituparno Ghosh; Anuja Chattopadhyay
- Story by: Anuja Chatterjee; Dialogues; Koushik Bhattacharya
- Directed by: Joydeep Mukherjee
- Starring: Mimi Chakraborty; Arjun Chakrabarty; Gaurav Chakrabarty
- Composer: Debojyoti Mishra
- Country of origin: India
- Original language: Bengali
- No. of seasons: 1
- No. of episodes: 251

Production
- Executive producer: Madhuja Badopadhyay
- Producers: Prosenjit Chatterjee; Arpita Pal
- Production location: Kolkata
- Running time: 22 mins
- Production company: Ideas Creations

Original release
- Network: Star Jalsha
- Release: 28 June 2010 – 16 April 2011

Related
- Durga (TV series)

Gaaner Oparey (transl. On the Other Side of Song) is an Indian Bengali television serial which aired on Star Jalsha from 28 June 2010 to 16 April 2011. This TV musical marked the beginning of a yearlong celebration of the 150th birth anniversary of the great Indian poet Rabindranath Tagore. The concept was a brainchild of the Indian director Rituparno Ghosh. The songs were all popular Rabindra sangeets. Prosenjit Chatterjee launched an audio CD of its tracks on Mahalaya on 12 October 2015. On account of Rabindranath Tagore's 157th birthday, Star Jalsha added Gaaner Oparey on Disney+ Hotstar on 9 May 2018. It was re-aired on Star Jalsha during the 2020 lockdown period, due to the COVID-19 pandemic.

== Storyline ==
The story revolves around a girl named Sohini (more commonly known as Pupe) from an orthodox Tagore worshipping family and Gora, an extremely talented but carefree lad, who repeatedly experiments with Rabindra sangeet. The story traces their relationship and human emotions through an imaginative portrayal of Tagore, his true ideals and their significance today. It also portrays the patriarchal society still prevalent in modern India. The serial used more than fifty Tagore songs and brought out their relevance in the lives of the protagonists. The cast was composed of stalwarts such as Sabyasachi Chakrabarty and Dipankar De plus newcomers Gaurav and Arjun Chakrabarty (sons of Sabyasachi Chakrabarty). The female lead was played by Mimi Chakrabarty in only her second project as an actress.

The show has portrayed three different forms of Rabindrasangeet: the more traditional kind through the voice of Pupe, a fused version with Hindustani classical music, through the voice of Pradipto, and an 'unplugged' rendition, sometimes incorporating rap words and band music, through Gora. Several singers such as Anindya Narayan Biswas, Samantak Sinha, Sharmistha Paul, Soumyojit Das, Amrita Datta, Debashish Banerjee and Runu Dutta were roped for playback singers.

== Cast ==
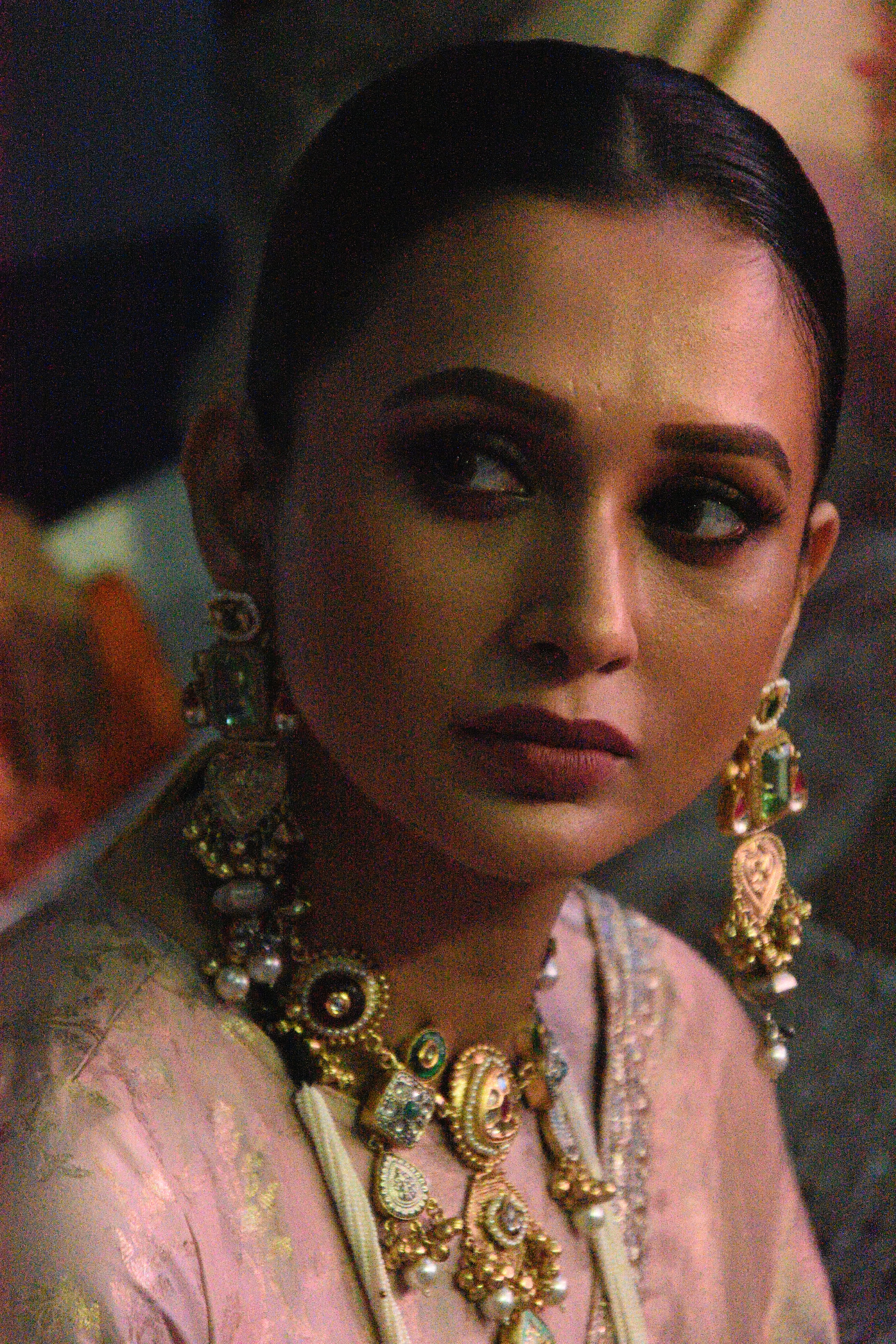
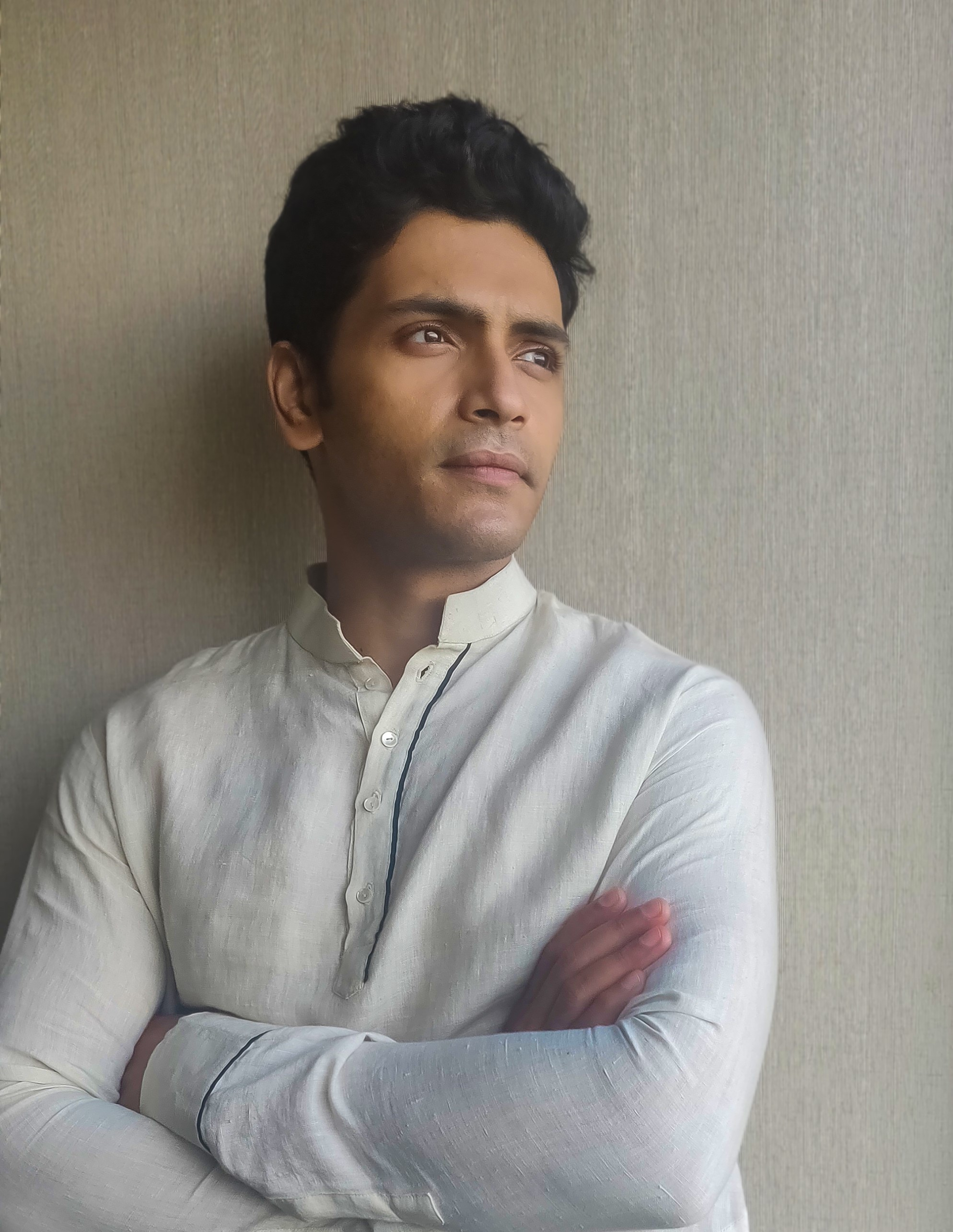
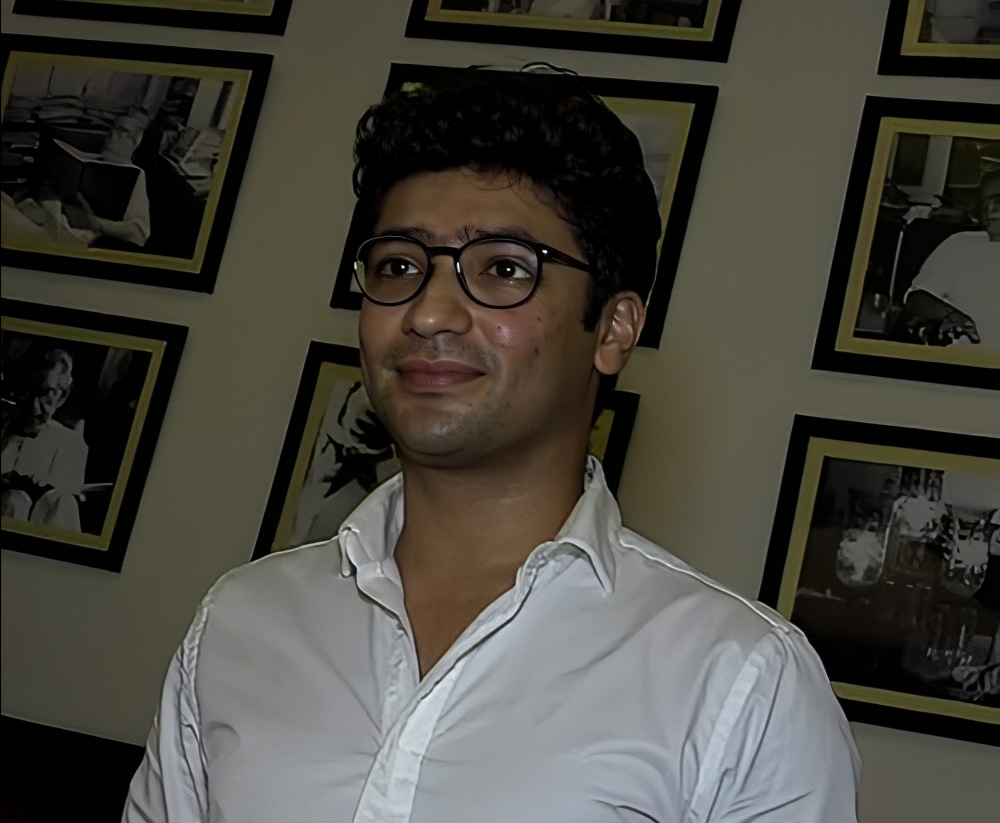
Top row: Mimi Chakraborty, Arjun Chakrabarty, Gaurav Chakrabarty.
Bottom row: Gaurav Chakrabarty, Arjun Chakrabarty, Mimi Chakraborty.
- Mimi Chakraborty as Pupe/Sohini Deb
- Arjun Chakrabarty as Gora
- Gaurav Chakrabarty as Pradipto Lahiri /Deep
- Dipankar De as Chandrasekhar Deb- owner of Sonar Tori, father of Nikhil, Binu, Bisri and Choton
- Alokananda Roy as Sucharita Sanyal (Thammi)
- Anindita Bose as Jhinuk Sanyal
- Indrasish Roy as Tintin (Trinanjon)
- Bodhiswatyo Majumder as Nikhilesh Dev (Nikhil)
- Krishnakishore Mukherjee as Subinoy Dev (Binu)
- Sabyasachi Chakrabarty as Sribilash Dev (Bisri)
- Anjana Basu as Shatarupa Deb (Rupa)
- Kaushik Sen as Chandrahash Dev (Choton)
- Anuradha Roy as Kamalika Deb
- Anindita Biswas Kapileshwari as Ajanta Deb
- Aparajita Adhya as Sudarshana Deb (Rani)
- Sourav Chatterjee as Uttiyo Deb (Bubai)
- Tania Kar as Nandini Deb (Mishtu)
- Shalmi Barman as Kumudini Deb (Kumu)
- Daminee Basu as Sumana
- Animesh Bhaduri as Sakya
- Biswajit Chakraborty as Pradyumna Lahiri
- Basabdatta Chatterjee as Damini (Mini)
- Mithu Chakrabarty as Keya Lahiri
- Joydip Kundu as Bablu-da
- Srijit Mukherji as Samiran (Sam)
- Rohit Samanta as Ayan
- Debjani Chattopadhyay as Labanya Dev (Bonya) (Chhoto Pishima)
- Papiya Sen as Boro Pishima (Niroja)
- Pradip Mukherjee as Boro Pishemoshai (Pranab)
- Ananya Chatterjee as Maitreyee
- Bhaskar Banerjee as Shankar Majumdar, Maitreyee's hunband
- Ardhendu Banerjee
- Judhajit Banerjee
- Saswata Chatterjee as Sangram Da (the chief-editor of Shahar TV)
- Ashrujit Nandi (cameo)
