= Karnasubarner Guptodhon =

- Poster of the movie
- Directed by: Dhrubo Banerjee
- Written by: Dhrubo Banerjee; Sougata Basu
- Produced by: Mahendra Soni; Shrikant Mohta
- Starring: Abir Chatterjee; Arjun Chakrabarty; Ishaa Saha; Saurav Das; Kamaleshwar Mukherjee
- Cinematography: Soumik Haldar
- Edited by: Sanglap Bhowmik
- Music by: Bickram Ghosh
- Production company: Shree Venkatesh Films
- Distributed by: Shree Venkatesh Films
- Release date: 30 September 2022 (India)
- Running time: 128 minutes
- Country: India
- Language: Bengali
- Box office: ₹9.8 crore

Karnasubarner Guptodhon (lit. 'The treasure of Karnasubarna') is a 2022 Indian Bengali-language action-adventure film directed by Dhrubo Banerjee and produced by Shrikant Mohta and Mahendra Soni. It is a sequel to Durgeshgorer Guptodhon and the third film in Sona Da franchise. The film was released on 30 September 2022, coinciding with Durga Puja, under the banner of SVF Entertainment. The film was a blockbuster at the box office and became the second highest grossing Bengali film of 2022 and one of the highest-grossing Bengali films of all time.

A sequel to this film and the Guptodhon franchise called Saptadingar Guptodhon was announced on 28 February 2025, during the slate announcement of the production house, where the trio are to yet again reprise their roles.

== Plot ==
Invited for an occasion, the trio, Subarna Sen aka Sona Da, Abir and Jhinuk, discover an old riddle and follow a perilous trail to find the hidden treasure of King Shashanka. As they face resistance from an old foe and their lives are put in peril, the quest for the great treasure becomes a dangerous hunt for power and wealth. As Sona Da tries to unlock every clue and crack the riddle, his mind constantly gets challenged and his loved ones face threats. His entire adventure hangs by the thread until he unearths one of the greatest treasures that Bengal has ever known.

== Cast ==
- Abir Chatterjee as Professor Subarna Sen aka. Sona da
- Arjun Chakrabarty as Abirlal Roy (Abir)
- Ishaa Saha as Jhinuk Majumdar
- Indradeep Dasgupta as Bhola Moira
- Rajatava Dutta as Dashanan Daw
- Kamaleshwar Mukherjee as Akhilesh Majumdar
- Anirban Sikdar as Ganesha
- Sourav Das as Bhujanga Hazra
- Barun Chanda as Biswambar Bandhyopadhyay
- Kinjal Nanda as Pitambar
- Anuradha Roy as Mrs. Bandyopadhyay

== Soundtrack ==
The background score and the soundtracks are composed by Bickram Ghosh and lyrics are penned down by Sugata Guha.

Track listing
No.	Title	Singer	Length
1.	"Karnasubarna Guptodhon Rap"	Bickram Ghosh	2:26
2.	"Palash Palash Mon"	Iman Chakraborty; Shovon Ganguly; Bickram Ghosh	2:50
3.	"Bhola Moirar Gaan"	Bickram Ghosh; Raghab Chatterjee	3:36
4.	"Tushu Gaan"	Bickram Ghosh; Sahana Bajpaie; Samantak	2:45

== Theatrical release ==
The film was released in theaters on 30 September 2022, on the occasion of Durga Puja. It simultaneously released in cities like Bengaluru, Delhi, Guwahati, Tezpur, Mumbai and other parts of India including Kolkata and entire West Bengal. It also released in the United States, Netherlands and Australia.

== Sequel ==
A new sequel has been announced titled Saptadingar Guptodhon. It is set to release on 15 May 2026 with Abir Chatterjee, Arjun Chakraborty and Ishaa Saha reprising their roles, directed by Dhrubo Banerjee.

== Reception ==
=== Box office ===
More than 20,000 tickets were sold in advance by 29 September, before the film's release. The film sold 80%–90% of its tickets on its release day. The film grossed around ₹2 crores in its first weekend and ₹5.5 crores in its first week.

=== Critical response ===
The Times of India rated the film 4/5 in its reviews. The newspaper described the film as "a fun-packed adventure with a touch of history" and praised it for serving "its purpose to entertain." Firstpost described the film as "There is another treasure hunt beckoning Citizen Sonada." and regarded the plot as "craftily assembled but finally an unremarkable treasure-hunt story."
