= Rishi Kaushik =

Indian Assamese actor (born 1979)

- Born: Kamakhyakinkar Kaushik; 13 September 1979 (age 47); Tezpur, Assam, India
- Occupation: Actor
- Years active: 2005–present
- Spouse: Debjani (m. 2012)

Rishi Kaushik is an Indian actor who acts in serials most notably in Bengali language serials in West Bengal. He has appeared in the Star Jalsa soap operas Ekhane Aakash Neel, and Ishti Kutum, where he played the role of the male protagonist Archisman Mukherjee. Since 2020, he has acted in several television dramas of Bangladesh.

== Early life ==
Rishi was born and brought up in an Assamese family in Tezpur, Assam. He graduated from Tezpur Academy and Guwahati University. He moved to Calcutta in 2002. His original name is Kamakhyakinkar Kaushik, while his nickname is Rishi.

== Career ==
His debut film is an Assamese film Rong, directed by Munin Barua. In Calcutta, his first telefilm was Daman. His debut film in Bengali is Kranti directed by Riingo Banerjee, where he played a negative role. His breakthrough performances were Ekdin Pratidin on Zee Bangla and Ekhane Aakash Neel on Star Jalsha. He joined BJP in 2019 to be in active politics.

== Personal life ==
On 29 November 2012, Rishi married his long-time girlfriend Debjani.

== Television ==
Year	Title	Role	Channel	Language	Production company (S)
2005 - 2007	Ekdin Pratidin	Indranath Laha	Zee Bangla	Bengali	Beyond Reels
2008 - 2010	Ekhane Aakash Neel	Dr. Ujaan Chatterjee	Star Jalsha	Bengali	Screenplay Flims
2010 - 2011	Mukhosh Manush	ACP Rishi Chatterjee	Star Jalsha	Bengali	Surinder Flims
2011 - 2015	Ishti Kutum	Archishman Mukherjee	Star Jalsha	Bengali	Magic Moments Motion Pictures
2016 - 2018	Kusum Dola	ADC Ronojoy Chatterjee	Star Jalsha	Bengali	Magic Moments Motion Pictures
2020–2021	Kora Pakhi	Ankur Banerjee	Star Jalsha	Bengali	Magic Moments Motion Pictures
2022	Sona Roder Gaan	Dr. Anubhab Maitra	Colors Bangla	Bengali	Magic Moments Motion Pictures
2023–2024	Jhanak	Tejas Kumar	Star Plus	Hindi	Magic Moments Motion Pictures
2024	Durga - Atoot Prem Kahani	Senapati Rajesh	Colors TV	Hindi	Magic Moments Motion Pictures
2025–Present	S.I.T. Bengal	DCP Indrajit Basak	Zee Bangla Shonar	Bengali	Surinder Films

=== Bangladeshi TV shows ===
Year	Title	Director	Role	Channel
2021	Physics, Chemistry, Math	Rakesh Basu		
2021	Ei Mon Tomari	Rakesh Basu	Professor Anik Aslam	
2021	Chilekothar Bhalobasha	Rakesh Basu		
2022	Re-Cycle Bin	Rakesh Basu	Dr. Ahaan Hossain	
2022	Kaktal Prem	S.R. Mazumder		
2022	Maria One Piece	Sajin Ahmed Babu		
2022	Oboshorprapto Premik	Shakal Ahmed	Anik	
2022	Golpo Prem	Shahnewaz Sazib	Abir Rayhan	
2024	Kleptomania	Rakesh Basu		

== Films and web series ==
- Feluda Pherot (2020) Season 1 - Chinnomostar Obhisap As Biren Choudhury/Ringmaster Karandikar
- Kranti - as Deva . His character had a negative shade.
- Chander Bari (2007) - as Joydip .
- Villain - as Police Inspector.
- Rong (2004) - Debut film in Assamese language.
- Mirza - as Kaustav Sen
- Paashbalish* as Inspector Adhiraj
- Emergency (2025 film)* as Sheikh Mujibur Rahman

== Awards ==
Year	Award	Category	Character	Serial
2011	Star Jalsha Parivaar Awards 2011	Priyo Bor	Ujaan	EKhane Akash Neel (Season 1)
2011	Star Jalsha Parivaar Awards 2011	Priyo Juti (with Ujaan Hiya)	Ujaan	EKhane Akash Neel (Season 1)
2012	Star Jalsha Parivaar Awards 2012	Sera Bor	Archi	Ishti Kutum
2012	Star Jalsha Parivaar Awards 2012	Priyo Chele	Archi	Ishti Kutum
2013	Star Jalsha Parivaar Awards 2013	Sera Bor	Archi	Ishti Kutum
2013	Star Jalsha Parivaar Awards 2013	Priyo Chele	Archi	Ishti Kutum
2014	Star Jalsha Parivaar Awards 2014	Priyo Chele	Archi	Ishti Kutum
2015	Star Jalsha Parivaar Awards 2014	Priyo Bhai	Archi	Ishti Kutum
