= Madly Bangalee =

- Film poster
- Directed by: Anjan Dutt
- Produced by: Namit Bajoria
- Starring: Supriya Choudhury; Biswajit Chakraborty; Chandan Sen; Aparajita Auddy; Sudipa Basu; Siddhartha Chatterjee; Baisakhi Marjit; Biswajeet Chakrabarty; Lew Hilt; Pijush Ganguly
- Edited by: Arghyakamal Mitra
- Music by: Neel Dutt
- Release date: 29 May 2009
- Running time: 130 minutes
- Language: Bengali

Madly Bangalee is a Bengali 2009 rock musical film directed by Anjan Dutt. During his previous film Bong Connection shot in Houston, Director Anjan Dutt received a lot of help and support from Houston filmmaker San Banarje who arranged for the film's American cast and crew and saved the film. During this period, Anjan Dutt became a self-proclaimed fan of San Banarje and named the protagonist of this film after San.

== Plot ==
Madly Bangalee is a Bengali rock band that inspires the film's title. They rehearse in a dowdy garage of Kolkata, owned by Bobby (Lew Hilt), who owns Bobby's Garage. Four young boys with stardust in their eyes practise their numbers not knowing what they are really aiming at. But the garage is under threat from a South Kolkata don Baburam (Chandan Sen). One morning, an elderly man, San (Anjan Dutt), arrives from "America and Paris." Baaji, (Sumit) the drummer who is a Muslim had to drop out of school. He escapes from the trap of turning a terrorist like his older brother Sultan. He later becomes a police officer who bashes up everyone who tries to bribe him. Neon (Tanaji Dasgupta) plays the bass guitar but, sucked into the world of drugs, he disappears from the face of the earth with his guitar. Pablo, lead singer, lead guitarist and lyricist, leaves for the US and the group breaks up. Bobby dies.

== Cast ==
- Soumyak Kanti DeBiswas as Pablo
- Anubrata Basu as Benji
- Tanaji Dasgupta as Neon
- Sumeet Thakur as Baaji
- Roshni Bose as Joy
- Anasuya Sengupta as Tanya
- Anjan Dutt as San aka Sandip Banerjee
- Saswata Chatterjee
- Siddhartha Chatterjee
- Biswajit Chokraborty
- Aparajita Auddy
- Supriya Choudhury

== Critical reception ==
CT journalist Anirban De praised the movie saying "I just don’t know how to express the varied emotions that blended all too well in bringing to life the music mania that has been haunting the Bengali rock crazy cult through the ages. Anjan Dutt's 'Madly Bangalee' is no doubt more than a mere tribute to the passion of rock and Neel Dutt complements the passion by compiling an ensemble of entrancing numbers enriched by the voices of Anjan Dutt himself, Nachiketa Chakraborty, Rupam Islam and Arko – the latter's 'Mere Maula' being the most captivating of the lot. Indraneel Mukherjee's cinematography adds up to the romance."

== Soundtrack ==
Serial	Song title	Artist	Music
01	"Ke Achho Kothay"	Nachiketa Chakraborty	Lyrics by Nachiketa Chakraborty & Music by Neel Dutt
02	"Maula"	Arko Mukherjee	Neel Dutt
03	"Tania"	Arko Mukherjee	Neel Dutt
04	"Tania"	Neel Dutt	Neel Dutt
05	"Samoy"	Tanya Sen	Neel Dutt
06	"Phirey Aschhe"	Ujjaini Mukherjee	Neel Dutt
07	"Kato Ki Karar Chhilo"	Anjan Dutt	Neel Dutt
08	"I Can Do"	Rupam Islam	Neel Dutt
09	"Samoy"	Rupam Islam	Neel Dutt
10	"Abide With Me"	Usha Uthup	Neel Dutt
