= Saptadingar Guptodhon =

2026 Indian Bengali film

- Release poster
- Directed by: Dhrubo Banerjee
- Written by: Dhrubo Banerjee; Sugata Guha
- Produced by: Shrikanto Mohta; Mahendra Soni
- Starring: Abir Chatterjee; Arjun Chakrabarty; Ishaa Saha; Rajatabha Dutta; Kaushik Ganguly; Prosenjit Chatterjee
- Cinematography: Soumik Haldar
- Edited by: Sanglap Bhowmik
- Music by: Indraadip Dasgupta
- Production company: SVF Entertainment
- Distributed by: PVR Inox Pictures
- Release date: May 15, 2026
- Running time: 133 minutes
- Country: India
- Language: Bengali

Saptadingar Guptodhon (Bengali pronunciation: [sɔptoɖiŋar ɡupt̪od̪ʱɔn]; The Treasure of the Seven Ships) is a 2026 Indian Bengali-language action-adventure film co-written and directed by Dhrubo Banerjee. Produced by Shrikant Mohta and Mahendra Soni under the banner of Shree Venkatesh Films, the film is a sequel to Banerjee's 2022 film Karnasubarner Guptodhon and also serves as the fourth instalment in the Guptodhon franchise. It stars Abir Chatterjee, Arjun Chakrabarty and Ishaa Saha reprising their roles as Sona Da, Abir and Jhinuk respectively.

== Plot ==
The story begins in Kolkata when a Cambridge-returned historian, Nishanath Chatterjee, approaches treasure hunter Subarna Sen aka Sonada. Mr. Chatterjee says he is the descendant of a 17th-century Brahmin from Benaras who nursed and cremated the fallen ruler, Raja Pratapaditya of Jessore, after his defeat by the Mughals. Before his death, the king entrusted the Brahmin with a ring and a gold coin with the royal seal to serve as keys to his hidden treasure. Mr. Chatterjee's father had found the location of the riches but died before sharing it, leaving the clues hidden inside a concealed diary.

After Sonada finds the diary in Mr. Chatterjee's library, he hesitates to pursue the adventure because his nephew Abir and his fiancee Jhinuk are preparing for their wedding. Before Sonada can proceed, Mr. Chatterjee is murdered and the trio is kidnapped and taken to the Sundarbans. The murder and abduction are orchestrated by the trio's recurring adversary, Dasanan Dawn, along with a mysterious Aditya Guha, who are also in search of the treasure.

In the wild, Sonada, Abir and Jhinuk must survive the harsh environment while decoding historical riddles and folklore linked to Raja Pratapaditya, the Manasamangal Kabya, and the stories of sea merchant Chand Sadagar, Manasa Devi, Behula, and Lakhindar. They encounter a tribe of Chand Sadagar's descendants who have protected the treasure for generations. In the climax, they race against time to prevent Dasanan and Aditya from finding the hidden wealth.

== Cast ==
- Abir Chatterjee as Subarna Sen aka Sonada, an Oxford-returned history professor and adventurer
- Arjun Chakrabarty as Abirlal Roy, Sonada's nephew
- Ishaa Saha as Jhinuk, Abir's girlfriend
- Rajatabha Dutta as Dasanan Dawn, the trio's recurring adversary
- Kaushik Ganguly as Mr. Nishanath Chatterjee/Aditya Guha, a Cambridge-returned historian and descendant of a Benaras priest, the main antagonist
- Prosenjit Chatterjee as himself (cameo appearance)
- Sumit Kumar Dey as Chandrapati, leader of the jungle tribe

== Production ==
The project is the first Guptodhon film since Karnasubarner Guptodhon (2022). The muhurat ceremony took place on 24 January 2026, during Saraswati Puja.

Principal photography began at the end of January 2026. Production locations included indoor filming at the Verde Vista banquet complex in Kolkata, which was turned into an awards ceremony set with red carpets, banquet tables, and promotional posters. On the first day of shooting, director Dhrubo Banerjee suffered a leg injury and directed subsequent sequences with his leg in a medical cast.

After the Kolkata schedule, production moved to the Sundarbans mangrove forest for the survival and treasure hunt sequences. The production team consulted a tiger conservation expert from the scripting stage to avoid disturbing the ecology and animals. Abir Chatterjee said the team shot only in areas that would not disturb wildlife. He also noted that after four years, the three lead actors were rediscovering each other on set, and that maturity seeped into the film's emotional fabric, with Sonada trusting Abir and Jhinuk more and giving them space. Chatterjee said Kaushik Ganguly's deadpan delivery of single lines often made the cast laugh uncontrollably.

Chatterjee stated that from the first film, the team decided Sonada would never smoke, and they dropped a scene where the trio rode a bike without helmets. He believes the films have reignited curiosity about Bengal's history and identity among younger viewers. The film is the 100th feature film for cinematographer Soumik Haldar since his career began in 2002.

In a video interview for Anandabazar, Abir Chatterjee discussed his preparation for the Sonada character and reiterated that the team consciously avoided showing the character with harmful habits such as smoking.

== Marketing ==
On 15 April 2026, coinciding with Poila Baisakh, SVF released the first teaser for Saptadingar Guptodhon.

On 8 May 2026, the trailer was launched at Nazrul Tirtha in Kolkata. The event also celebrated the 100-day box office run of Vijaynagar'er Hirey. Present at the event were Abir Chatterjee, Arjun Chakrabarty, Ishaa Saha, director Dhrubo Banerjee, Kaushik Ganguly, Rajatabha Dutta, and Prosenjit Chatterjee. Speaking at the launch, Prosenjit Chatterjee said that Bengali audiences had warmly embraced adventure stories and franchise films. Abir Chatterjee said the film retains the old nostalgia and emotion while presenting the mystery on a larger scale. Arjun Chakrabarty and Ishaa Saha noted that shooting in the Sundarbans added a new dimension to the story. Dhrubo Banerjee said the film's foundation remains family-centric emotional adventure entertainment.

On 19 May 2026, a screening was organized by Young Metro, The Telegraph, and TTIS at INOX (Quest Mall) for Kolkata educators. Attending school principals and teachers said the film provided an alternative to violence-heavy digital entertainment and integrated historical fiction into storytelling for children. On 20 May 2026, the filmmakers held a screening for underprivileged children, disabled youth, and senior citizens.

== Release ==
Saptadingar Guptodhon was released in the theatres on 15 May 2026.

=== Premiere ===
A premiere was held on 25 May 2026 at PVR INOX in South City Mall. It was attended by the lead actors Abir Chatterjee, Ishaa Saha and Arjun Chakrabarty, besides Prosenjit Chatterjee and other eminent personalities from the Bengali film industry. Speaking at the premiere, Abir Chatterjee said he did not expect Sonada to become such a recurring figure in Bengali popular culture and noted that families had grown up with the films. He added that audiences are now smarter and expectations are higher, so the film tries to retain the franchise's comfort while placing the characters in a more emotionally uncertain space. Director Dhrubo Banerjee said that maintaining freshness within a familiar format remains the franchise's biggest challenge, and that with this film they wanted the environment itself to feel more threatening, using the Sundarbans for that texture while still functioning as a family entertainer.

== Critical reception ==
The film received mixed-to-positive reviews. Critics praised Abir Chatterjee's performance as Sonada and the film's appeal as a family entertainer, though opinions differed on its pacing and structure.

Poorna Banerjee of The Times of India gave the film 3.5 out of 5 stars. She wrote that the adventure takes time to find its rhythm but rewards patience with witty dialogue and convincing performances. She praised the film's interactive quality, which layered legend with history to draw viewers into solving puzzles alongside the protagonists. She also said the CGI was polished by Bengali mainstream standards and the production design sustained the fantasy element.

Shubhankar Chakraborty of The Wall wrote that the film does not talk down to its audience. He said the story becomes gripping about twenty minutes in and prioritizes an engaging narrative over franchise nostalgia. He praised the script for weaving historical lore into a modern adventure, introducing younger audiences to figures like Chand Sadagar and Manasa Devi. He noted that the emotional arc involving Chand Sadagar's descendants ends abruptly. He called Abir Chatterjee's performance believable, Arjun Chakrabarty's a step forward, and Kaushik Ganguly's outstanding. He criticized a pronunciation slip (stalagmite) by Ganguly's character and said Prosenjit Chatterjee's cameo lacked significant dialogue.

Ranjan Bandyopadhyay of Sangbad Pratidin called the film an unmissable family entertainer that demands full viewer engagement. He noted that the narrative shifts after the interval from a standard mystery to heightened tension. He praised the main cast and singled out Rajatabha Dutta's villainous laugh as the film's trump card and Kaushik Ganguly's performance as the backbone of the climax. Atreyee Poddar of Indulgexpress wrote that the franchise still has fuel left in the tank after eight years, praising the chemistry of the core trio and the integration of Bengali folklore.

Malini Banerjee of The Federal gave a mixed review, criticizing the sudden exposition, pacing, and over-reliance on franchise tropes such as centuries-old mechanical levers, perfectly preserved torches, and repeated jokes about Abir's hunger. She questioned whether the franchise was losing its touch. Agnivo Niyogi of the Calcutta Telegraph wrote that the plot unfolds "a little too conveniently," with clues solved easily and events feeling engineered to keep the story moving rather than building tension. He also said Rajatabha Dutta and Arjun Chakrabarty gave engaging performances but their roles felt underwritten, with Chakrabarty's dialogue sometimes leaning into exaggerated "Gen-Z humour."

Actor and filmmaker Parambrata Chattopadhyay, in a guest column for t2online, wrote that the film succeeds because it uses a template Bengali audiences want, satisfying a fascination with riddles and hidden treasure. He praised Abir Chatterjee's portrayal and singled out Arjun Chakrabarty's comedic monologue detailing the Manasamangal Kabya in contemporary social media vernacular. He also noted narrative fatigue from repeated riddle-based tropes and said the dialogue between Abir and Jhinuk could have been written for a more adult trajectory given the characters' decade-long growth.

Critics praised the technical aspects. Soumik Haldar's cinematography received positive notices from Bandyopadhyay and Chakraborty for capturing the atmosphere of the Sundarbans forest. The change in music directors from Bickram Ghosh to Indraadip Dasgupta was widely remarked upon. Chakraborty wrote that Dasgupta's score worked as a core storytelling element, using shifting arrangements and a recurring rap theme to generate tension. Bandyopadhyay similarly noted its high-energy impact. Reviewers agreed that the "VFX tiger" sequence fell short; Chakraborty said it looked incomplete and jarring against the otherwise realistic visual palette.

== Box office ==
The film grossed ₹5.64 crore net in India and achieved a worldwide net collection of ₹6.28 crore. After 2 weeks, it collected over ₹7 crore.
