= Ek Mutho Roddur =

Ek Mutho Roddur is a 2019 Indian Bengali drama film directed by Arindam Banerjee, produced by Aakanksha Multimedia Pvt. Ltd. and bankrolled by Aakanksha Banerjee. The film featuring Vikky, Chayanika Debnath, Kharaj Mukherjee, Sudip Mukherjee, Supriyo Dutta, Debranjan Nag and Harshawardhan, follows the story of Abhimanyu (played by Vikky) and Srabanti (played by Chayanika), who lose touch after meeting at a Mumbai college. The movie was released on 18 January 2019.

== Synopsis ==
Abhimanyu is the son of a multi-millionaire who wants him to pursue a stable career. However, Abhimanyu is passionate about music, leading to a lot of friction between the father and the son. He leaves home and comes to Kolkata to prove himself to his father. He struggles and faces a lot of trouble, and meets Shrabonti, the female protagonist. The movie is a tale of love and finding one's roots.

== Cast ==
- Kharaj Mukherjee
- Chayanika
- Debranjan Nag
- Supriyo Dutta
- Vikky
- Sudip Mukherjee
