= Buro Sadhu =

2019 Indian Bengali language film

- Official poster
- Bengali: বুড়ো সাধু
- Directed by: VIK
- Screenplay by: Priyam Sengupta; VIK
- Produced by: Abir Ghosh; Somnath Ghosh
- Starring: Ritwick Chakraborty; Ishaa Saha; Mishmee Das; Chiranjeet Chakraborty
- Cinematography: Sanjib Ghosh
- Edited by: Arghyakamal Mitra
- Music by: Pranjal Das
- Production companies: Wisemonk Creative; DNA Entertainment Networks
- Release date: 1 November 2019
- Running time: 96 mins
- Country: India
- Language: Bengali
- Budget: ₹90 lakh

Buro Sadhu (Bengali: বুড়ো সাধু) is an Indian Bengali psychological thriller film directed by VIK and produced by Wisemonk Creative in association with Abir Ghosh and Somnath Ghosh and co-produced by DNA Entertainment Networks. The film starring Ritwick Chakraborty, Chiranjeet Chakraborty, and Ishaa Saha follows the journey of the protagonist Abir, from boyhood to manhood, his disturbed family life and relationships during his journey from rags to riches. The film was released in India on 1 November 2019

== Cast ==
- Ritwick Chakraborty as Abir
- Chiranjeet Chakraborty
- Ishaa Saha as Sweta
- Dolon Roy
- Mishmee Das as Abir’s first girlfriend
- Debesh Chattopadhyay
- Barun Chakraborty
- Amit Saha

== Release ==
The official motion poster was released by Webaqoof Music on 2 September 2019. The official trailer was released by Webaqoof Music on 23 September 2019.

== Soundtrack ==
Buro Sadhu

Soundtrack album by Pranjal Das
- Released: 5 October 2019
- Recorded: 2019
- Studio: Aural Work Station
- Genre: Feature film soundtrack
- Label: Webaqoof Music
- Producer: Nabarun Bose

The soundtrack is composed by Pranjal Das and lyrics are also by him.

Track list
No.	Title	Singer(s)	Length
1.	"Ashkara"	Timir Biswas, Bumpai Chakraborty	4:56
2.	"Jole Jhapas Na"	Pranjal Das	4:11
3.	"Buro Sadhu Title Track" (Poem written by Anindya Mukhopadhyay and recitation by Lopamudra Bhattacharya)	Anupam Roy	2:40
