= Sweater (film) =

- Directed by: Shieladitya Moulik
- Written by: Joeeta Sengupta
- Based on: Wool Kanta by Joeeta Sengupta
- Produced by: Soumya Sarkar; Prateek Chakravorty
- Starring: Ishaa Saha Riju Biswas ( Cameo ) June Maliah Sreelekha Mitra Kharaj Mukherjee
- Cinematography: Udaysingh Mohite
- Music by: Ranajoy Bhattacharjee
- Production companies: PSS Entertainments; Pramod Films; P&P Entertainment
- Release date: 29 March 2019 (India)
- Running time: 118 min
- Country: India
- Language: Bengali

Sweater is a 2019 Bengali family drama film directed by Shieladitya Moulik and produced by PSS Entertainments, P&P Entertainment and Pramod Films. This film was released on 29 March 2019. Anindya Chattopadhyay and Ranajoy Bhattacharjee are the music directors of the movie.

== Plot ==
The film revolves around Tuku, a simple girl whose parents are worried because she doesn't have any qualities and not getting married. But her sister is a smart and talented girl. Many families came to see Tuku but each time she was rejected. She has an ongoing affair with Pablo, a rock star who is not willing to commit fully yet. Her rebellious sister is also in a relationship with a boy called Akash and regularly gets gifts from him, but refuses to let him know that she is interested in him so that he would chase her. One day a family comes to see Tuku. But before the marriage her would be mother-in-law places a condition on her that she has to be an expert in knitting. Eventually she goes to her aunt's house to learn this art. There she meets Shamyo, a violin player. In spite of being a cancer patient, his optimism towards life inspires Tuku a lot and transforms her into a confident and new person. On the other hand, though Akash is invited to her home, he refuses to marry her sister as he had realised that Tuku's sister had only used him for a give and take relationship. When Tuku returns to her home, she refuses her marriage proposal and pays back Pablo as well for the cutlets he used to feed her for two years.

== Soundtrack ==
Preme Pora Baron sung by Lagnajita Chakraborty was the most popular song of this film. Preme Pora Baron Lyrics was written by Ranajoy Bhattacharjee.

Track list
No.	Title	Lyrics	Singer	Length
1.	"Preme Pora Baron Lyrics (প্রেমে পড়া বারণ) (Female)"	Ranajoy Bhattacharjee	Lagnajita Chakraborty	3:33
2.	"Adure Din (আদুরে দিন) (Male)"	Tamoghna Chatterjee	Ranajoy Bhattacharjee	3:38
3.	"Wool Bonar Panchali (উল বনের পাঁচালি)"	Anindya Chatterjee	Anindya Chatterjee	3:04
4.	"Aj Amar Akash (আজ আমার আকাশ)"	Ranajoy Bhattacharjee	Rupankar Bagchi	3:50
5.	"Era Sukher Lagi (এরা সুখের লাগি)"	Rabindranath Tagore	Iman Chakraborty	3:55
6.	"Aj Amar Akash - Reprise"	Ranajoy Bhattacharjee	Ranajoy Bhattacharjee	5:49
7.	"Somoy Vese Jay (সময় ভেসে যায়)"	Tamoghna Chatterjee	Keka Ghoshal	2:51

== Cast ==
- Ishaa Saha as Tulika a.k.a. Tuku
- Riju Biswas as Akash ( Cameo )
- June Maliah as Mother in law of Tuku
- Sreelekha Mitra as Gouri Sen Tuku's aunt
- Kharaj Mukherjee as Mahadeb a.k.a. Tuku's father
- Saurav Das as Pablo, Tuku's boyfriend
- Anuradha Mukherjee as Sree, sister of Tuku
- Farhan Imroze as Shamyo
- Sidhu Ray as Mrityunjoy Sen Tuku's uncle

== See also ==
- Mukherjee Dar Bou, 2019 Bengali film
