= Anjan Dutt =

Indian filmmaker and musician (born 1953)

- Dutt in a movie premiere, 2017

Background information
- Born: 19 January 1953 (age 73)
- Genres: Pop; urban folk
- Occupations: Singer-songwriter; actor; film director; theatre personality
- Instruments: Vocals; guitar
- Years active: 1981–present
- Labels: RPG, Sagarika Musics Pvt Ltd.
- Children: Neel Dutt

Anjan Dutt (Note: Bengali pronunciation: [ɔnd͡ʒɔn d̪ɔt̪ːo].) (Bengali pronunciation: [ɔnd͡ʒɔn d̪ɔt̪ːo]; born 19 January 1953) is an Indian film director, actor, and singer-songwriter known for his work in the Bengali alternative music genre anyodharar gaan. As an actor, Dutt began his career in Bengali cinema in the Mrinal Sen film Chaalchitra, for which he won the best newcomer actor award at the Venice Film Festival. He acted in Aparna Sen's hit film, Mr. and Mrs. Iyer. In 2018 he featured in Swapnasandhani's new play Taraye Taraye, as Vincent van Gogh, under the direction of Kaushik Sen.

He is also a national award-winning filmmaker and is one of the most prominent directors of Bengali cinema, directing Dutta Vs Dutta, Madly Bangalee, The Bong Connection, Chalo Let's Go, and Ranjana Ami Ar Ashbona. In recent years, he has directed a Byomkesh film series. He is mainly famous for his Bengali adventure movies.

== Early years ==
Anjan Dutt was raised in the mountains of North Bengal. He had his schooling from St. Paul's School in Darjeeling. He completed his graduation of BA English literature from Calcutta University

In the late teens, he joined a group called Open Theatre and in the early twenties performed plays translated from the works of renowned foreign playwrights like Sartre, Peter Weiss, Jean Genet and Bertold Brecht. The group clearly drew inspiration from Nandikar, a highly active and already famous theatre group at the time. Due to politically sensitive content, they faced many obstructions in producing and performing their work, and eventually, the group discontinued its repertoire.

Dutt was first selected for the feature film Chalachitro, directed by renowned filmmaker Mrinal Sen. The film and his performance were critically acclaimed at the Venice Film Festival, but for unknown reasons, was never released commercially. Dutt said that he was more interested in doing art cinema than commercial mainstream cinema. After doing a few art films that were not so commercially successful, including the critically well-received Juganto, scarcity of job opportunities forced him to take up jobs in advertising and later as a journalist for the Kolkata-based daily, The Statesman.

== Singing career ==
At that time, Dutt was greatly influenced by the music of Bob Dylan, Kabir Suman, Leonard Cohen who had heralded a new era in Bengali music through his songs. These songs and lyrics, commonly referred to as Jeebonmukhi (জীবনমুখী ) (literally meaning "towards life"), were concerned with the tough reality of Bengali middle-class social life, in and around Kolkata.

== Discography ==
=== Albums ===
- Shunte Ki Chao (1994)
- Purono Guitar (1995)
- Bhalobashi Tomay (1996)
- Keu Gaan Gaye (1997)
- Ma (1998)
- Chalo Bodlai (1998)
- Priyo Bandhu (1998)
- Hello Bangladesh (1999)
- Kolkata–16 (1999)
- Bandra Blues (2000)
- Asamoy (2000)
- Rawng Pencil (2001)
- Onek Din Por (2004)
- Ichchhe Korei Eksathe (2005)
- Abar Pothe Dekha (2007)
- Ami ar Godot (2007)
- Unoshaat (2014)

=== Singles (1996–2011) ===
- "Khawar Gaan" (3:02) (with Nachiketa Chakraborty & Suman Chattopadhyay)
- "Hotuk Shob Oshundor" (1:58) (with Shalini Chatterjee, Shayari Das, Tanushree Haldar & Sreetoma Ghosh)
- "Feludar Gaan" (3:04) (with Nachiketa Chakraborty & Suman Chattopadhyay)
- "Freedom" (5:37) (with Indrani Sen, Indranil Sen & others)
- "Sadhinota" (4:50) (with Indrani Sen, Indranil Sen & others)
- "Ekushe Pa" (3:57)
- "Bow Barracks Forever!" (4:38)
- "Tumi Na Thakle" (4:25) (with Usha Uthup)

== Filmography ==
Year	Film	Credits		Comment	Ref
Year	Film	Director	Actor	Comment	Ref
1981	Chaalchitra		Yes		
1982	Kharij		Yes		
1982	Grihajuddha		Yes		
1988	The Bengali Night		Yes		
1989	Ek Din Achanak		Yes		
1991	City of Hope		Yes		
1992	Mahaprithibi		Yes		
1992	City of Joy		Yes		
1993	Sunya Theke Suru		Yes		
1993	Shilpi		Yes		
1993	Antareen		Yes		
1995	Yugant		Yes		
1998	Badadin	Yes		Hindi directorial debut	
2001	Dekha		Yes		
2002	Mr. and Mrs. Iyer		Yes		
2004	Bow Barracks Forever	Yes		Bengali directorial debut	
2006	The Bong Connection	Yes			
2008	Chalo Let's Go	Yes			
2009	Madly Bangalee	Yes	Yes		
2009	Chowrasta: Crossroads of Love	Yes			
2010	Byomkesh Bakshi	Yes			
2010	Mahanagar @ Kolkata		Yes		
2011	Ranjana Ami Ar Asbona	Yes	Yes	Abani	
2011	Urochithi		Yes		
2011	Jani Dekha Hobe		Yes		
2012	Chitrangada: The Crowning Wish		Yes		
2012	Abar Byomkesh	Yes			
2012	Dutta Vs Dutta	Yes	Yes	Biren Dutt	
2013	BBD	Yes		Unreleased	
2013	Ganesh Talkies	Yes			
2014	Sesh Bole Kichhu Nei	Yes	Yes		
2014	Byomkesh Phire Elo	Yes			
2015	Nirbaak		Yes		
2015	Byomkesh Bakshi	Yes			
2015	Monbaksho	Yes	Yes	Yet to release	
2015	Saheb Bibi Golaam		Yes	Jimmy Luke	
2016	Hemanta	Yes			
2016	Byomkesh O Chiriyakhana	Yes	Yes	Kokonad Gupta (cameo)	
2016	The Bongs Again	Yes			
2017	Byomkesh O Agniban	Yes	Yes	Kokonad Gupta	
2018	Ami Ashbo Phirey	Yes	Yes		
2018	Uma		Yes	Brahmanamda Chakraborty	
2018	Ahare Mon		Yes		
2018	Byomkesh Gotro		Yes		
2018	Ek Je Chhilo Raja		Yes		
2019	Shah Jahan Regency		Yes		
2019	Finally Bhalobasha	Yes	Yes		
2019	Shankar Mudi		Yes		
2019	Satyanweshi Byomkesh		Yes	Screenplay	
2019	Ghawre Bairey Aaj		Yes		
2019	If Not for You	Yes		Himself	
2020	Saheber Cutlet	Yes	Yes		
2021	Murder In The Hills	Yes	Yes	Web Series	
2021	Rabindranath Ekhane Kokhono Khete Asenni		Yes	Web Series	
2021	Bony		Yes		
2021	Danny Detective Inc.	Yes	Yes	Web Series	
2022	Murder by the Sea	Yes	Yes	Web Series	
2022	Haami 2		Yes		
2023	Revolver Rohoshyo	Yes	Yes		
2023	Seven	Yes	Yes	Web Series	
2023	Palan		Yes	Sequel to Kharij	
2024	Chaalchitra Akhon	Yes	Yes		
2025	Ei Raat Tomar Amaar		Yes		
2025	Shreeman v/s Shreemati		Yes		
2025	Deri Hoye Gechhe		Yes		

== Biography ==
Anjan Jatra (অঞ্জনযাত্রা) is a biographical non-fiction book written by Sajjad Hussain. The book was published by Chhapakhanar Bhut, a renknowned publishing house in Bangladesh, in 2018. The book reflects Dutt's life, theatrical beginnings, cinematic journey, and musical evolution.

== Awards ==
=== Chaalchitra ===
- 1981 - Alitalia Award for Best Actor award for film Chaalchitra at Venice Film Festival tied with Rodolfo Bigotti for Bosco d'amore.

=== Bong Connection ===
- Bong Connection was screened at Museum of Modern Art, New York, in 2005.

=== Ranjana Ami Ar Ashbona ===
- 2012 - National Film Award – Special Jury Award for Ranjana Ami Ar Ashbona
- 2012 - National Film Award for Best Feature Film in Bengali for Ranjana Ami Ar Ashbona

=== Finally Bhalobasha ===
- 2019 - Best lyrics for Finally Bhalobasha at WBFJA for Nominated.

=== Chaalchitra Ekhon ===
- 2023 - Special jurry Mention award winner at Kolkata International Film Festival for Chaalchitra Ekhon.
- 2024 - Best Actor Award Winner at 22nd Dhaka International Film Festival 2024 for Chaalchitra Ekhon.
- 2024 - Second Best Script winner at Imagine India International Film Festival 2024 for Chaalchitra Ekhon.
- 2024 - Official Selection at Hyderabad Bengali Film Festivalfor Chaalchitra Ekhon.
- 2025 - Best Film Winner( Critics' Choice) at Anandalok Puraskar
- 2025 - Best film, Best Actors, Best Director at Imagineindia Film Festival, Madrid, Spain
- 2025 - Filmfare Awards Bangla 2025 – Best Film (Critics') for Chaalchitra Ekhon (Shared with Abhinandan Banerjee for Manikbabur Megh)
- 2025 - Filmfare Awards Bangla 2025 – Best Actor (Critics') for Chaalchitra Ekhon (Shared with Chandan Sen for Manikbabur Megh)
- National Film Awards for Best Bengali language movie, 2026

== Announcement of final stage act and retirement from theatre ==
In September 2024, Anjan Dutt announced his retirement from the stage. In a public announcement, the actor revealed the poster of his soon-to-be-performed play Aro Ekta Lear.

== See also ==
- Neel Dutt
- Mainak Bhaumik
- Pratim D. Gupta
