= Arjun Chakrabarty =

Indian actor (born 1990)

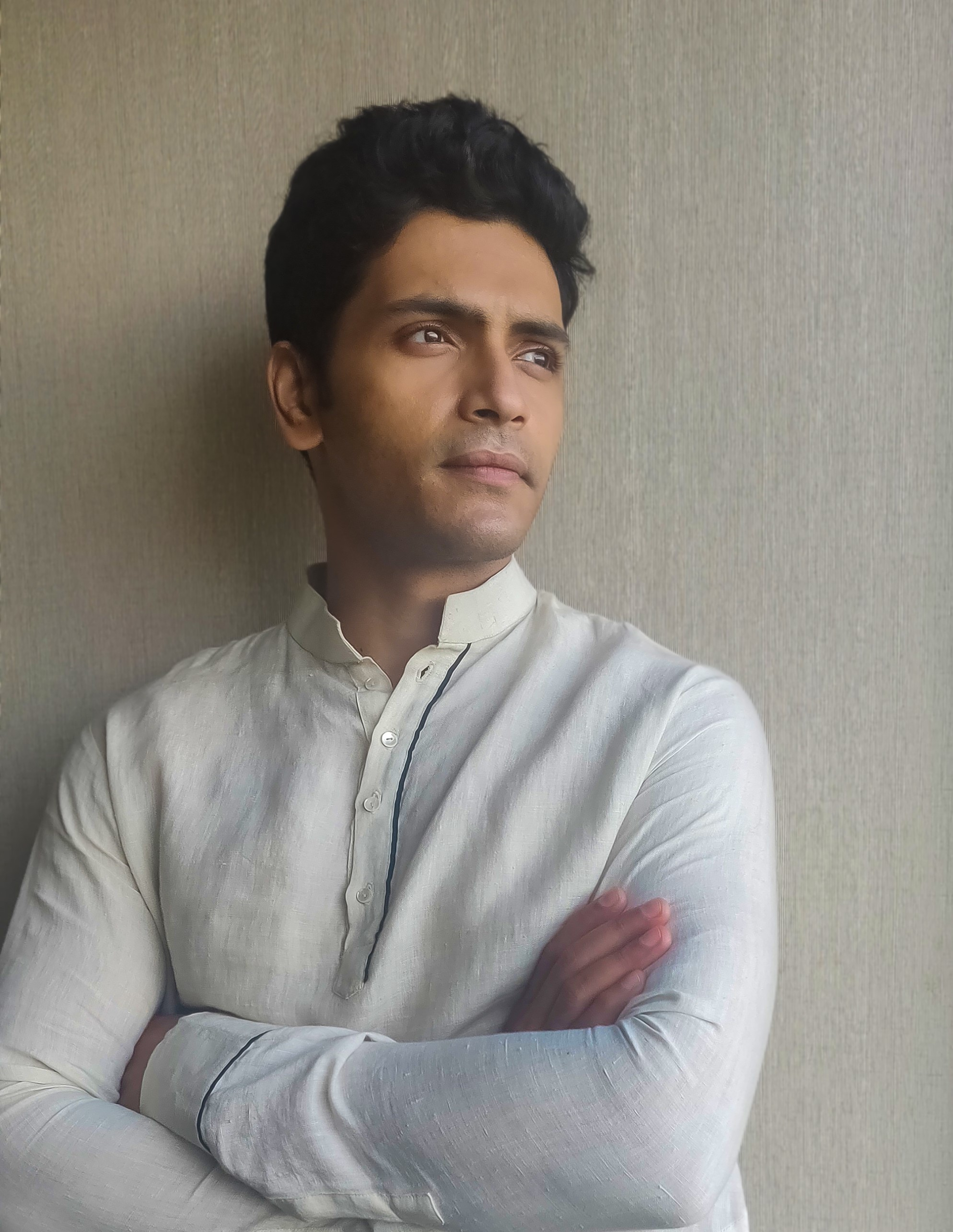
- Arjun in 2021
- Born: 5 March 1990 (age 36); Calcutta, West Bengal, India
- Other name: Rishi
- Education: Assembly of God Church School, Park Street; St. Xavier's College, Kolkata
- Occupation: Actor
- Years active: 2010–present
- Height: 1.80 m (5 ft 11 in)
- Spouse: Sreeja Sen (m. 2016)
- Children: Avantika
- Parent(s): Sabyasachi Chakrabarty (father); Mithu Chakrabarty (mother)
- Relatives: Gaurav Chakrabarty (brother); Ridhima Ghosh (sister-in-law)

Arjun Chakrabarty is an Indian Bengali actor who works in film and television. He made his television debut in the Star Jalsha series Gaaner Oparey (2010–2011), portraying Gora. He later played Ishan Chatterjee in the television series Jamai Raja (2017–2018). Chakrabarty made his film debut in Sudeshna Roy and Abhijit Guha's Bapi Bari Jaa (2012).

== Career ==
Arjun Chakrabarty made his television debut alongside his elder brother, Gaurav Chakrabarty, in the Star Jalsha megaserial Gaaner Oparey. Chakrabarty had previously appeared as a child actor in Satyajiter Priyo Golpo, which aired on DD Bangla in 2000. Chakrabarty made his film debut with the romantic comedy Bapi Bari Jaa, directed by Sudeshna Roy and Abhijit Guha, which was released in December 2012. In 2017, Chakrabarty returned to television with Jamai Raja, which aired on Zee Bangla.

== Filmography ==
- Bapi Bari Jaa
- Jodi Love Dile Na Prane
- Chirodini Tumi Je Amar 2
- Bonku Babu
- Janla Diye Bou Palalo
- Kokhon Tomar Asbe Telephone
- Asche Bochor Abar Hobe
- Auto No. 9696
- Bawal
- Pink
- One
- Maacher Jhol
- Kichu Na Bola Kotha
- Rongberonger Korhi
- Guptodhoner Sandhane
- Crisscross
- Byomkesh Gotro
- Finally Bhalobasha
- Durgeshgorer Guptodhon
- Sakkhi
- Tushagni
- Awaasan
- Love Aaj Kal Porshu
- Saheber Cutlet
- Avijatrik
- X=Prem
- Karnasubarner Guptodhon
- Khela Jawkhon
- Mitthye Premer Gaan
- 5 No Swapnomoy Lane
- Shotyi Bole Shotyi Kichhu Nei
- Devi Chowdhurani
- Saptadingar Guptodhon

== Television ==
- Satyajiter Priyo Golpo (Tollywood-e Tarininkhuro)
- Gaaner Oparey
- Bojhena Se Bojhena
- Professional
- Byomkesh (Shojarur Kanta)
- Akash Choan
- Sei Meyeta
- Jamai Raja
- Anurager Chhowa
- Noyontara

== Short films and web series ==
- Debi
- Flames
- The Hungry Stones
- The Nightwatchman
- Satyameva Jayate
- Bonyo Premer Golpo 2
- Murder in the Hills
- Byomkesh (S7)
- Mukti
- Mahabharat Murders
- Murder by the Sea
- Homestay Murders
- Rajneeti
- Abar Rajneeti
- Shaheb Bibi Joker
- Bondhu Chol
- Swadkahon (Ei Toh Jibon)
- Tomake Bujhina Priyo
- Roktofolok
- Osthir

== Reality Show ==
- Khola Hawa - 25 EY Shaan

== Theatre ==
- Ekhon Tokhon
- Dudh Kheyeche Mao

== Music video ==
- Majhe Majhe Tobo
- Amar Chalaki

== Awards and nominations ==
Year	Award	Category	Film/TV Show	Result
2011	Star Jalsha Parivaar Awards	Agami Diner Star	Gaaner Oparey	Won
2011	Telesomman	Best Male Debutant	Gaaner Oparey	Won
2011	Big Bangla Rising Star Awards	Best Rising Star (Male)	Gaaner Oparey	Won
2017	2nd Bengal International Short Film Festival	Best Actor (Male)	Flames	Won
2018	Zee Banglar Sonar Sansar 2018	Sera Jamai	Jamai Raja	Won
2018	Hyderabad Telangana Bengali Film Festival	Best Supporting Role	Byomkesh Gotro	Won
2019	West Bengal Film Journalists' Association Awards	Best Actor in a Negative Role	Byomkesh Gotro	Won
2019	West Bengal Film Journalists' Association Awards	Best Actor in a Supporting Role	Guptodhoner Sandhane	Nominated
2019	Bharat Bangladesh Film Awards	Best Actor In A Supporting Role	Byomkesh Gotro	Won
2020	Hoichoi Awards	Couple of the Year (With Madhumita Sarcar)	Love Aaj Kal Porshu	Won
2021	Hoichoi Awards	Best Supporting Actor Male	Murder in the Hills & Byomkesh (S7)	Won
2021	Kolkata Glitz Awards 2021	Notable Performance Male (Web Series)	Murder in the Hills	Nominated
2021	Films and Frames Digital Film Awards	Best Supporting Actor Male (OTT)	Murder in the Hills	Nominated
2022	West Bengal Film Journalists' Association Awards	Best Actor in a Leading Role	Avijatrik	Nominated
2022	Filmfare Awards East	Critics' Best Actor in a Leading Role (Male)	Avijatrik	Won
2023	West Bengal Film Journalists' Association Awards	Best Actor in a Leading Role	X=Prem	Nominated
2023	Filmfare Awards East	Best Actor in a Supporting Role (Male)	X=Prem	Nominated
2023	TV9 Bangla Ghorer Bioscope Awards	Best Supporting Actor-Web Series	Murder by the Sea	Nominated
2024	Star Jalsha Parivaar Awards	Priyo Trendsetter	Anurager Chhowa	Won
2024	Marketing and Advertising Awards	Rising Star of the Year (Male) – Gold Winner	—N/a	Won
2024	NABC and International Bengali Entertainment Awards 2024	Most Versatile Young Actor – (OTT & Movies)	Abar Rajneeti	Won
2025	Joy Filmfare Glamour & Style awards West Bengal 2025	Hotstepper of the Year (Male)	—N/a	Won
