= Mahendra Soni =

Indian film producer and media executive

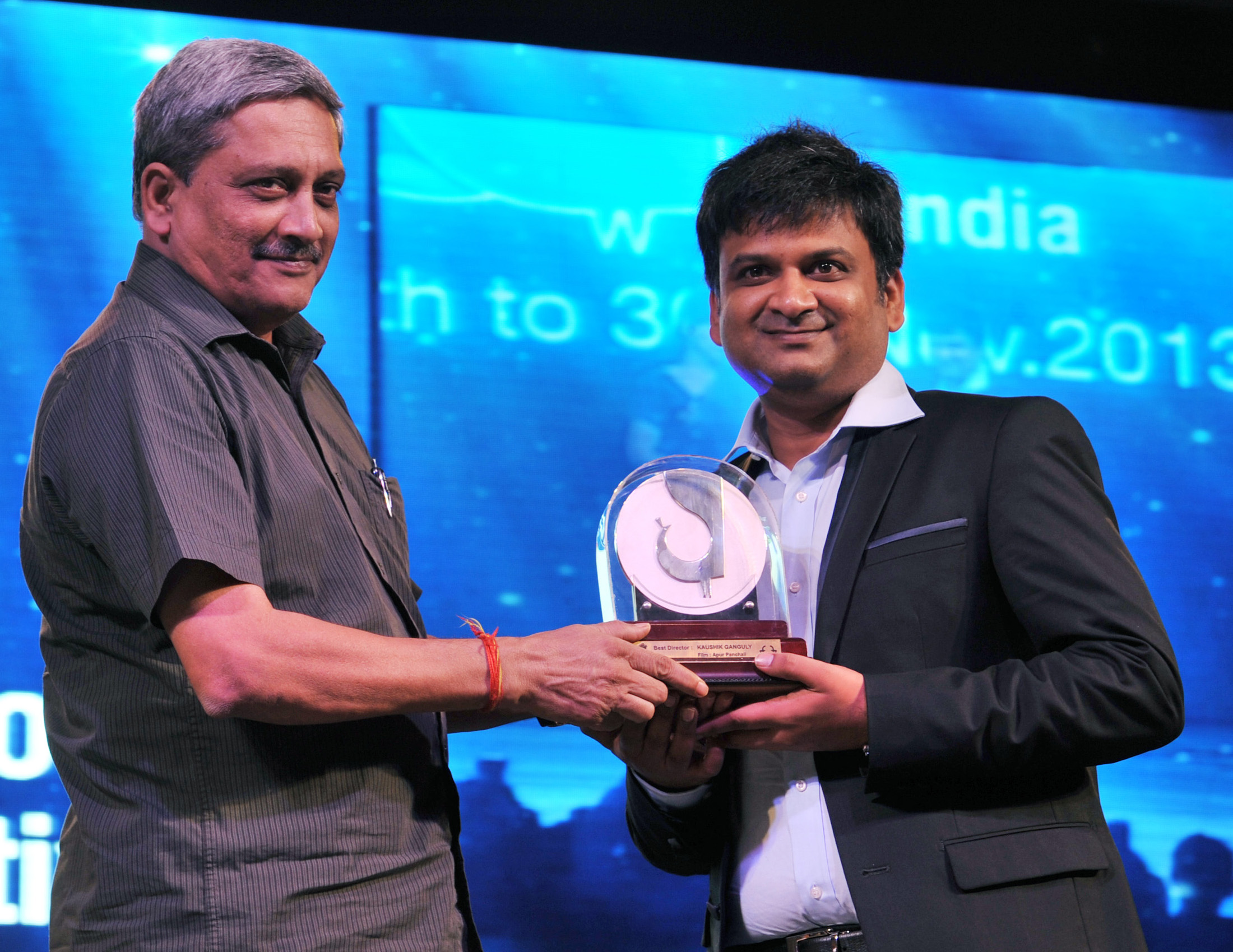
- Occupations: Film producer, media executive, entrepreneur
- Years active: 1995–present
- Organization(s): SVF Entertainment; Hoichoi
- Known for: Co-founding SVF Entertainment and Hoichoi

Mahendra Soni is an Indian film producer, media executive and entrepreneur. He is the co-founder and director of SVF Entertainment Private Limited, a Kolkata-based media and entertainment company associated with Bengali cinema, television, music, film distribution, cinema exhibition and streaming. He is also a co-founder of Hoichoi, a Bengali-language video streaming platform launched by SVF in 2017.

== Career ==
=== SVF Entertainment ===
Soni co-founded Shree Venkatesh Films, later known as SVF Entertainment, with Cousin brother Shrikant Mohta in the 1990s. According to The Economic Times, Soni and Mohta were cousins who did not come from a film background and were earlier associated with a family business before entering film distribution and production. ThePrint reported that the two entered the film business in the early 1990s and later moved from film distribution into producing Bengali films.

SVF's first film production was Bhai Amar Bhai, released in 1995 according to The Economic Times and discussed by later coverage as part of the company's early production history. The company subsequently became associated with commercial Bengali films as well as films by directors such as Rituparno Ghosh, Kaushik Ganguly and Srijit Mukherji. ThePrint noted that SVF-backed films included Chokher Bali and Ek Je Chhilo Raja, both of which were cited in the report in connection with National Film Award-winning Bengali cinema.

In 2026, Business Standard described Soni as co-founder and director of SVF Entertainment and reported on the company's attempt to expand beyond the Bengali-language market into Hindi, Gujarati and Punjabi content. The same report described SVF as an integrated entertainment company with interests in film production, distribution, exhibition, television, music and streaming.

=== Cinema exhibition and distribution ===
SVF has also been involved in cinema exhibition and distribution in West Bengal. In 2025, Business Standard reported that Soni and SVF were working to revive cinema screens in West Bengal, where the number of screens had declined from 400 in 2000 to 140 in 2015. The report stated that SVF had mapped districts in the state and had begun building, managing or acquiring cinema screens in towns including Bolpur, Purulia, Krishnanagar, Narendrapur, Baruipur and Jalpaiguri.

A later Business Standard report stated that SVF managed or owned screens across towns and districts in West Bengal as part of its integrated business model.

=== Hoichoi and digital media ===
Soni is a co-founder of Hoichoi, a Bengali-language streaming platform launched by SVF in September 2017. At launch, The Economic Times reported that Hoichoi would offer Bengali entertainment content across web, iOS, Android and Chromecast, including Bengali films, songs, original web series, short films and documentaries. Express Computer similarly reported that the platform launched with original web series, more than 500 Bengali films and more than 1,000 Bengali songs.

In 2018, Hoichoi announced additional original content and offline subscription options. Exchange4media reported that Soni, described as director and co-founder of Hoichoi, said the introduction of Hoichoi Top Up Cards was intended to reach subscribers in tier-II and tier-III cities.

In 2021, Mint identified Soni as co-founder and director of SVF and co-founder of Hoichoi while reporting on SVF's partnership with the short-video platform Josh to make Bengali music content available to creators.

Variety has also covered Hoichoi and SVF's content slate. In 2021, it reported on Hoichoi's plans for a 30-title slate and expansion across Bangladesh, Southeast Asia and the Middle East. In 2025, Variety covered SVF and Hoichoi's 2025–26 content slate and identified Soni as co-founder and director of SVF.

=== Music and television ===
Soni has also been associated with SVF Music. In 2022, Music Plus interviewed him as co-founder and director of SVF Music about the Bengali music industry, streaming platforms and SVF Music's content initiatives. The publication described SVF Music as a Bengali music label producing film music, non-film original music, concerts and content for OTT and web platforms. Mahendra Soni thinks that the independent music scene has to grow in West Bengal.

Indiantelevision.com reported that Soni discussed SVF's Bengali television business, including the company's television content production and work with major Bengali broadcasters.

=== Expansion outside India ===
In 2023, SVF announced projects in Bangladesh in collaboration with Alpha-i Studios and Chorki. Financial Express reported that Soni, described as co-founder and director of SVF Entertainment and Hoichoi, said the company was taking steps to deepen its relationship with the entertainment industry of Bangladesh through local film production. ET BrandEquity also reported on SVF's move into the Bangladeshi film market and described Soni as co-founder-director of SVF Entertainment and Hoichoi.

== Public profile ==
In 2021, The Telegraph published an interview with Soni on SVF completing 25 years, describing him as co-founder and director of SVF and discussing the company's role in Bengali cinema, film production, distribution and the changing movie business.
