= Shree Venkatesh Films =

Indian media and entertainment company

SVF Entertainment Pvt. Ltd.
- SVF Logo

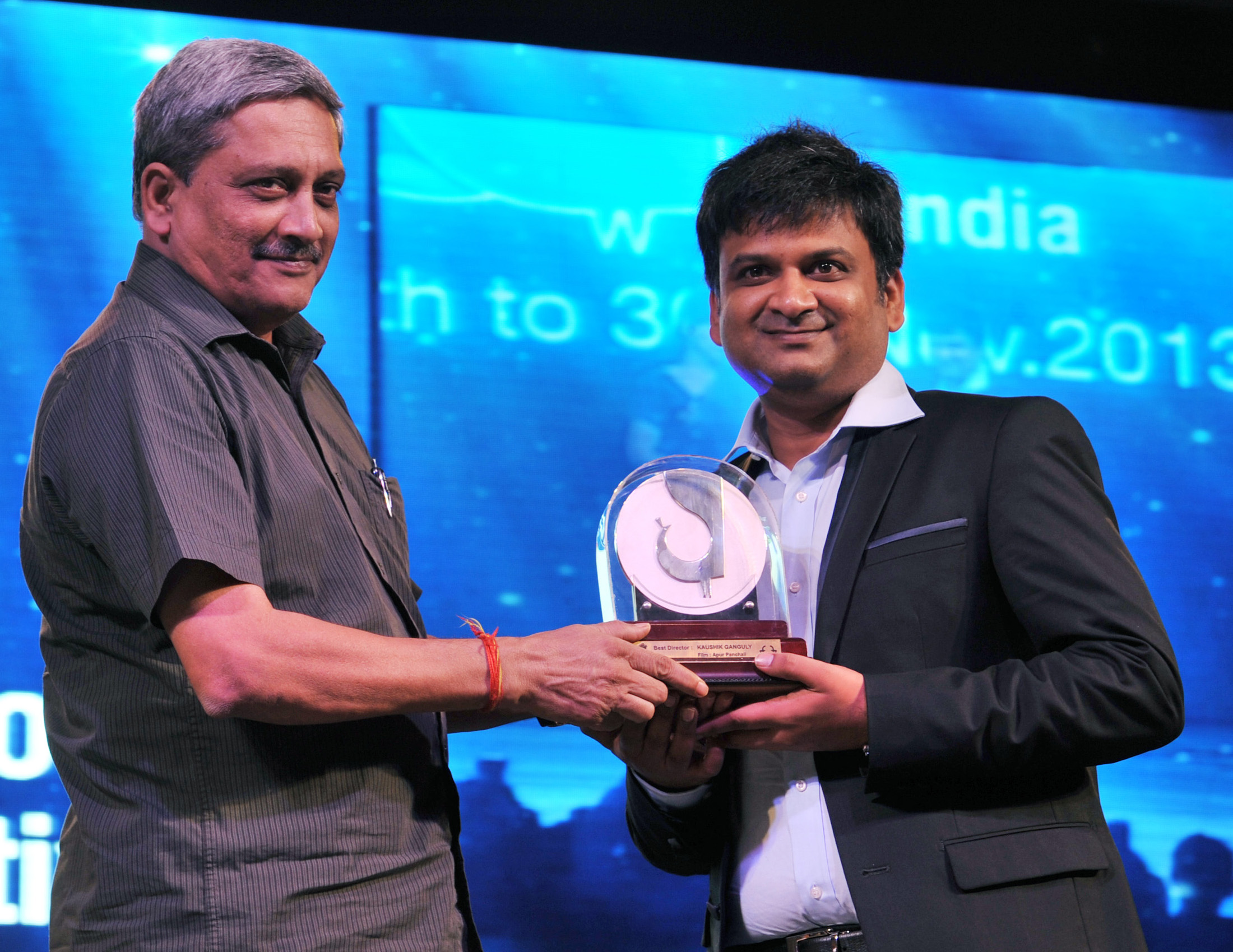
- SVF's co-founder Shri Mahendra Soni (right) receives the Silver Peacock Best Director award for the Bengali film Apur Panchali, at the 44th International Film Festival of India (IFFI-2013)
- Type: Media and Entertainment Company
- Founded: 1995; 31 years ago
- Founder: Shrikant Mohta; Mahendra Soni
- Headquarters: Kolkata, West Bengal, India
- Key people: Shrikant Mohta; Mahendra Soni; Vishnu Mohta
- Subsidiaries: SVF Films; SVF Television; SVF Music; SVF Cinemas; SVF Distribution; SVF Brands; SVF Devotional; SVF Stories; SVF Talent; SVF Digital Cinema; SVF Movies; SVF Bharat; SVF Alpha-i; Sangeet Bangla; Hoichoi; Hoichoi Studios

YouTube information
- Channel: SVF
- Years active: July 6, 2006 – present
- Genre: Entertainment · Film production · Music
- Subscribers: 15.4 million
- Views: 9.48 billion
- Last updated: June 28, 2025
- Website: SVF

SVF Entertainment Pvt. Ltd. is an Indian film production and distribution company, founded by Shrikant Mohta and Mahendra Soni in 1995. Apart from producing and distributing Bengali films in West Bengal, Bangladesh, Assam and Tripura, SVF also distributes Bollywood and Hollywood films in East India. The other divisions of the company include Exhibition, TV Content Production, Digital Cinema, Music, New Media and IPR syndication. SVF was in Anandabazar Patrika's powerlist for 2008 and 2010.

== Background ==
SVF Entertainment Pvt. Ltd. was founded in 1995 by Shrikant Mohta and Mahendra Soni. They started off as distributors of Hindi films like Bekaar Ka Number, Khamoshi in Eastern India. Their first film production is in 1996, Bhai Amar Bhai starring Prosenjit Chatterjee and Chiranjeet Chakraborty and directed by Swapan Saha which became a blockbuster. Later, they produced the Prosenjit Chatterjee starrer Sasurbari Zindabad in 2000, which became the highest-grossing Bengali movie until then. They followed it up with successful films like Sathi (2002), I Love You (2007), and Chirodini ...Tumi Je Aamar (2008). Along with commercial entertainers they have also backed experimental films by directors like Rituparno Ghosh, Kaushik Ganguly, Srijit Mukherji, Sandip Ray and Dhrubo Banerjee.

In the film entertainment space, SVF has the following divisions: Production, Television, Distribution, Music, Digital Cinema, Exhibition and New Media.

== Film production ==
SVF Entertainment Pvt. Ltd. has produced more than 160 films including National Award winning films like Memories in March, Chokher Bali, Raincoat, Chotoder Chobi, Ek Je Chhilo Raja, Gumnaami or blockbusters like Sasurbari Zindabad, Sathi, Minister Fatakeshto, Champion, Chirodini Tumi Je Amar, Challenge, Paran Jai Jaliya Re, Josh, Prem Aamar, Shedin Dekha Hoyechilo, Amanush, Awara, Bojhena Shey Bojhena, and parallel films such as Mishar Rohosya, Guptodhoner Sondhane, Ek Je Chhilo Raja, Durgeshgorer Guptodhon, Chander Pahar, Amazon Obhijaan and Karnasubarner Guptodhon Autograph, Iti Mrinalini, Memories in March, Baishe Srabon, Royal Bengal Rahasya, Hemlock Society, Chitrangada: The Crowning Wish, Rajkahini, Uma, Byomkesh Gotro, Durgeshgorer Guptodhon, Golondaaj, and Karnasuborner Guptodhon .

== Digital cinema ==
In January 2008, SVF Entertainment Pvt Ltd. entered a partnership with Real Image Media Technologies to bring their Qube Digital Cinema technology to Eastern India.

== Television ==
In the television space, SVF has co-promoted Media Worldwide Limited and its four leading channels: Music India, Sangeet Bangla, Sangeet Bhojpuri, Sangeet Marathi and Music India UK. The company has also produced prime-time shows for Zee Bangla, Star Jalsha, Colors Bangla, Rupashi Bangla, Mahua Bangla, Sananda TV. The shows include Trinayani, Bojhena Se Bojhena, Goyenda Ginni, Maa....Tomay Chara Ghum Ashena, Behula, Durga, Bandhan, I Love You, Sindoorkhela, Janmantar, Mrs Singha Roy, Bisharjan, Sangsar Sukher Hoy Ramanir Guney, Bodhu Kon Alo Laglo Chokhe, Gopal Bhar, Bhootu, Dashi, Anurager Chhowa, Basu Paribar, and Chirodini Tumi Je Amar .

11 years after establishment, SVF produced Hindi language television shows such as Bhutu for Zee TV, Dil Ko Tumse Pyaar Hua and Sampoorna for Hindi GEC channel Star Plus and Aami Dakini for Sony Entertainment Television.

=== Hoichoi ===
The OTT platform Hoichoi is a subsidiary of the company. It produced original content including Chupkotha (2018 Bengali horror film and series, with Parno Mittra and Shataf Figar), Tarader Shesh Tarpon, Bishohori and Indu.
