= Goenda Shabor =

Series of Indian crime thriller films

- Created by: Shirshendu Mukhopadhyay
- Original work: Rwin

Print publications
- Novels: Rwin; Prajapatir Mrityu O Punarjanmo; Aloy Chhayay; Rup; Podokkhep; Marich; Eagoler Chokh; Shiri Bhenge Bhenge; Tirandaj; Amake Biye Korben?
- Comics: List of comics

Films and television
- Films: Ebar Shabor (2015); Eagoler Chokh (2016); Asche Abar Shabor (2018); Tirondaj Shabor (2022)

Miscellaneous
- Portrayers: Saswata Chatterjee

Goenda Shabor (transl. Detective Shabor) is a Bengali fictional detective series of police officer Shabor Dasgupta, created by novelist Shirshendu Mukhopadhyay.

This is a series of Indian crime thriller films directed by Arindam Sil starring Saswata Chatterjee in the title character. The first film Ebar Shabor was released in 2015, and the second film Eagoler Chokh released in 2016. A third film titled Aschhe Abar Shabor was released in 2018.

== Stories ==
- Rwin
- Prajapatir Mrityu O Punarjanmo
- Aloy Chhayay
- Rup
- Podokkhep
- Marich
- Eagoler Chokh
- Shiri Bhenge Bhenge
- Tirandaj
- Amake Biye Korben?

== Films ==
=== Ebar Shabor (2015) ===
This film is based on 'Rwin' by Shirshendu Mukhopadhyay. A police detective Shabor Dasgupta (Saswata Chatterjee) is entrusted with the daunting task of solving the mystery surrounding the murder of Mitali Ghosh (Swastika Mukherjee), a woman with a messy past, who was killed on the night she had thrown a party for friends and family. The task is daunting for Shabor because of the number of people involved. Mitali was once married to Mithu Mitra (Abir Chatterjee), whom she divorced before settling overseas. Though she soon realised how much she loved him, her ego kept her from coming back to him. Heartbroken, Mithu found love in Mitali's cousin Joyeeta (Payel Sarkar). Also involved was Mitali's childhood friend and secret admirer Samiran (Rahul Banerjee), who has relationships with several women, including a school's physical education teacher, Julekha Sharma (June Malia), and another girl, Khonika (Debolina Dutta). Shabor starts investigation with his assistant Nandalal. As Shabor probes deeper, he learns many disturbing secrets about the Ghosh family, including the fact that Mitali had once eloped with a boy from her locality Pantu Haldar (Ritwick Chakraborty). She had married and left him within six months, ruining his future in the process. Another character, Doel, also comes into the picture. The detective now has to deal with the complex relationship problems that run deep root in the family and the mystery gets more and more complicated. The film released on 2 January 2015.

=== Eagoler Chokh (2016) ===
This film is based on the story of same name written by Shirshendu Mukhopadhyay. ACP Shabor Dasgupta (Saswata Chatterjee) and his assistant Nanda go on a hunt, searching for a young woman murderer. Trapped in a maze of lies and deceit, Dasgupta suspects the rich entrepreneur Bishan Roy (Anirban Bhattacharya) and three women connected to him. Each of them knew the murdered woman Nandini very well. As Dasgupta delves deep into the mystery, he ends up getting new insight into human psychology and in turn, solving complexities of his own mind. The film was released on 12 August 2016.

=== Aschhe Abar Shabor (2018) ===
After success of Eagoler Chokh, a sequel had been confirmed by director Arindam Sil. The film is based on the novel Prajapatir Mrityu O Punorjanmo by Shirshendu Mukhopadhyay. After completing its first schedule in West Bengal, the team flew to Lucknow to shoot rest of the part. Saswata Chatterjee, Subhrajit Dutta and Gourav Chakrabarty returned for the sequel as their respective characters with Indraneil Sengupta, Anindya Chatterjee, Anjana Basu and Mir Afsar Ali with major characters. The film was released on 19 January 2018.

=== Tirandaj Shabor (2022) ===
On 27 May 2022, the fourth film of Shabor series Tirandaj Shabor was released under the direction of Sil. The movie is based on a novel 'Tirandaj' by Shirshendu Mukhopadhyay. Saswata Chatterjee, Subhrajit Dutta, Nigel Akkara, Arindam Sil and Chandan Sen played the lead role in the film.

== Cast and characters ==
Character	Film			
Character	Ebar Shabor (2015)	Eagoler Chokh (2016)	Aschhe Abar Shabor (2018)	Tirandaj Shabor (2022)
Shabor Dasgupta	Saswata Chatterjee	Saswata Chatterjee	Saswata Chatterjee	Saswata Chatterjee
Nandalal Roy	Subhrajeet Dutta	Subhrajeet Dutta	Subhrajeet Dutta	Subhrajeet Dutta
Mitali Ghosh	Swastika Mukherjee			
Joyeeta Ghosh	Payel Sarkar			
Pantu Haldar	Ritwick Chakraborty			
Mithu Mitra	Abir Chatterjee			
Rita/Julekha/Doyel Ghosh	June Malia			
Khonika	Debolina Dutta			
Samiran Bagchi	Rahul Banerjee			
Madhu Bagchi	Santu Mukherjee			
Haren	Nitya Ganguly			
Barun Ghosh	Dipankar De			
Arun Ghosh	Rajat Ganguly			
Sanjib Das		Gaurav Chakraborty	Gaurav Chakraborty	
Shivangi Roy		Jaya Ahsan		
Nandini Sen		Payel Sarkar		
Bishan Roy		Anirban Bhattacharya		
Shataroop Sen		Deboprasad Haldar		
Rita Fernandez		Arunima Ghosh		
Paromita Das		Eshika Dey		
Jahnabi		Riya Banik		
Psychiatrist Madhurima Sen		June Malia		
Shyamangi		Ushoshi Sengupta		
Badshah		Amritendu Kar		
An Inspector		Joydeep Kundu		
Dr. Arjun Dasgupta		himself		
Bijoy Sen			Indraneil Sengupta	
TBA			Anindya Chattopadhyay	
Sharon			Anjana Basu	
Sujit			Mir Afsar Ali	
Rinku Roy			Diti Saha	
TBA			Darshana Banik	
Uma			Tuhina Das	
Jyoti			Priyanka Mondal	
Sofia			Anamika Chakraborty	
Sumana			Arunima Ghosh	
Sumit Ghoshal / Bulu da				Nigel Akkara
Satinath Samaddar				Arindam Sil
Pareshnath Chakraborty				Chandan Sen
Sonali Basu				Poulomi Das
Jamuna				Saranya Kar
Papiya Samaddar				Debjani Chatterjee
Pritha / Rumki				Devlina Kumar

== Crew ==
Character	Film			
Character	Ebar Shabor (2015)	Eagoler Chokh (2016)	Aschhe Abar Shabor (2018)	Tirandaj Shabor (2022)
Director	Arindam Sil	Arindam Sil	Arindam Sil	Arindam Sil
Producer(s)	Reliance Entertainment; Mundus Services	Shree Venkatesh Films	Shree Venkatesh Films	Camellia Productions
Screenplay	Padmanabha Dasgupta; Arindam Sil	Padmanabha Dasgupta; Arindam Sil	Padmanabha Dasgupta; Arindam Sil	Padmanabha Dasgupta; Arindam Sil
Story	Shirshendu Mukhopadhyay	Shirshendu Mukhopadhyay	Shirshendu Mukhopadhyay	Shirshendu Mukhopadhyay
Editor(s)	Sujay Dutta Ray	Sujay Dutta Ray	Sanjib Dutta	Sanglap Bhowmik
Director of photography	Soumik Haldar	Soumik Haldar	Soumik Haldar	Ayan Sil
Composer(s)	Bickram Ghosh	Bickram Ghosh	Bickram Ghosh	Bickram Ghosh

== Awards and nominations ==
=== Eagoler Chokh (2016) ===
Award	Category	Recipient(s)	Result
Filmfare Awards East 2017	Filmfare Award for Best Film – Bengali	Eagoler Chokh	Nominated
Filmfare Awards East 2017	Filmfare Award for Best Director – Bengali	Arindam Sil	Nominated
Filmfare Awards East 2017	Filmfare Award for Best Actress – Bengali	Jaya Ahsan	Nominated
Filmfare Awards East 2017	Filmfare Award for Best Supporting Actor – Bengali	Anirban Bhattacharya	Won
Filmfare Awards East 2017	Filmfare Award for Best Dialogue – Bengali	Arindam Sil; Padmanabha Dasgupta	Nominated
Filmfare Awards East 2017	Filmfare Award for Best Screenplay – Bengali	Arindam Sil; Padmanabha Dasgupta	Nominated
Filmfare Awards East 2017	Filmfare Award for Best Editing – Bengali	Sujay Dutta Ray	Nominated
Filmfare Awards East 2017	Filmfare Award for Best Background Score – Bengali	Bickram Ghosh	Nominated
Filmfare Awards East 2017	Filmfare Award for Best Cinematography – Bengali	Soumik Haldar	Nominated
Filmfare Awards East 2017	Filmfare Award for Best Sound Design – Bengali	Anindit Roy; Adeep Singh Manki	Nominated
