= Dear Maa =

2025 Indian Bengali-language drama film

- Theatrical release poster
- Directed by: Aniruddha Roy Chowdhury
- Written by: Sakyajit Bhattacharya; Aniruddha Roy Chowdhury
- Produced by: Aniruddha Roy Chowdhury; Indrani Mukherjee; Aashish Singh; Pooja Singh; Sameerr Rao; Shillpa Kataria Singh
- Starring: Jaya Ahsan; Chandan Roy Sanyal; Ahana; Nandika Das; Saswata Chatterjee; Dhritiman Chatterjee; Anubha Fatehpuria
- Cinematography: Avik Mukhopadhyay
- Edited by: Sujoy Dutta Roy
- Music by: Bickram Ghosh
- Production companies: ABP Studios; Flying Colours Pictures; Opus Communications; Ace Of Spades Entertainment
- Distributed by: PVR Inox Pictures
- Release date: 18 July 2025
- Running time: 144 minutes
- Country: India
- Language: Bengali

Dear Maa (transl. Dear Mother) is a 2025 Indian Bengali-language drama film directed by Aniruddha Roy Chowdhury and produced by Aashish Singh. The film marks Chowdhury's return to Bengali cinema after a decade, following his acclaimed 2014 film Buno Haansh. It explores themes of motherhood, adoption, and identity through the story of a career-driven woman who adopts a child.

The film features Jaya Ahsan in the lead role, supported by Chandan Roy Sanyal, child actors Ahana and Nandika Das, Saswata Chatterjee, Dhritiman Chatterjee, and Anubha Fatehpuria. It was released theatrically on 18 July 2025 to positive critical reception, with particular praise for Ahsan's performance. The film was also screened in North America and Canada, with discussions about potential Oscar eligibility.

== Plot ==
The film centers on Brinda, a successful and career-driven professional who opts to postpone starting a family in order to focus on her professional aspirations. As an established individual in her field, she has cultivated a lifestyle that prioritizes her career over personal commitments. However, after engaging in several introspective therapy sessions, Brinda and her husband Awrko begin to reevaluate their life choices. This leads them to decide on adopting a child, despite Brinda's lingering hesitations regarding motherhood and the uncertainties it may bring to her well-structured life.

Tragically, Brinda's life takes a heartbreaking turn with the untimely death of Awrko, leaving her to navigate the complexities of single parenthood alone and solely responsible for their adopted daughter, Jhimli. The narrative deepens as it explores the intricacies of Brinda's emotional world, revealing her internal struggle between her career, her grief over Awrko's passing, and her efforts to forge a meaningful relationship with Jhimli.

The film's central crisis unfolds when, at the age of twelve, Jhimli mysteriously disappears without any explanation. This crucial event propels Brinda into a desperate search for her daughter, intertwined with themes of maternal instinct, love, and the fear of loss. As the narrative oscillates between past and present, it uncovers the complexities of Brinda and Jhimli's relationship, highlighting the joys and challenges of motherhood against the backdrop of Brinda's personal journey.

Throughout the course of the investigation into Jhimli's disappearance, Brinda encounters hidden truths about her daughter's life that she was previously unaware of. These revelations include significant connections to Jhimli's biological mother, complicating Brinda's understanding of her own role as a parent. This exploration invites viewers to confront profound questions regarding the essence of motherhood, the emotional bonds formed beyond biological ties, and the impact of personal loss on familial relationships.

As Brinda navigates grief, guilt, and the desire to connect with Jhimli, the film ultimately serves as a poignant examination of what it means to be a mother, challenging traditional notions and emphasizing the deep emotional ties that can exist in various forms of family dynamics. Through Brinda's journey, audiences are invited to reflect on the multifaceted nature of love, sacrifice, and the indomitable spirit of a mother's quest to find her child and discover her true self.

== Cast ==
- Jaya Ahsan as Brinda Mitra, a career-driven professional who struggles with motherhood after adopting a child
- Chandan Roy Sanyal as Awrko, Brinda's husband who enthusiastically embraces fatherhood
- Ahana as the teenage Jhimli, Brinda's adopted daughter
- Nandika Das as the younger Jhimli
- Saswata Chatterjee as Asitabha, a police officer who investigates Jhimli's disappearance
- Dhritiman Chatterjee as Brinda's mentor
- Anubha Fatehpuria as the family's house help
- Shayan Munshi in a supporting role
- Padmapriya Janakiraman in a special appearance

== Production ==
=== Development ===
Aniruddha Roy Chowdhury conceived the project after a friend shared a story that inspired him, marking his return to Bengali cinema after working primarily in Hindi films for a decade. He developed the concept with writer Sakyajit Bhattacharya, with whom he had previously worked, describing their process as "jamming together, writing, thinking, and enjoying" rather than a formal approach. The development was intensive, taking two years and 23 drafts to finalize the script. Chowdhury turned down a Hindi film offer with ten times the budget because he felt the story required expression in Bengali, a language he personally connected with for this project.

Chowdhury specifically wrote the lead role for Jaya Ahsan, inspired by her performance in their previous collaboration Kadak Singh, citing her "subtle arrogance," dignity, and silent depth as perfect for the character. The supporting cast including Saswata Chatterjee and Chandan Roy Sanyal were selected for their ability to portray nuanced characters, with Chatterjee playing a layered police officer and Sanyal bringing bohemian unpredictability. A key part of the process involved mandatory workshops focused on relationship-building and exploration, which helped young actors portray complex emotions with maturity. The film was scored by Bickram Ghosh, marking his first collaboration with Chowdhury.

=== Filming ===
Principal photography began in May 2024 in Kolkata, with additional shooting taking place during the monsoon season. The production utilized notable Kolkata locations including Birkmyre Hostel on Middleton Row, a historic colonial building with French windows that provided a distinctive atmospheric backdrop. Chowdhury maintained a collaborative approach on set, encouraging improvisation while paying meticulous attention to small details in performances and blocking.

The production emphasized relationship-building among cast and crew, creating a supportive atmosphere with snacks and informal interactions. Key scenes featured Dhritiman Chatterjee and Jaya Ahsan walking through corridors, with Chowdhury carefully choreographing their movements and pauses. The child actors received particular praise for their performances, especially impressive given it was their first acting experience. Co-producer Indrani Mukerjee handled costume design in addition to her production duties, maintaining the film's visual continuity while managing birthday celebrations during the shoot.

== Soundtrack ==
Dear Maa (Original Motion Picture Soundtrack)

Soundtrack album by Bickram Ghosh
- Released: 7 July 2025
- Genre: Feature film soundtrack
- Length: 18:08
- Language: Bengali
- Label: Eternal Sounds

Track listing
| No. | Title | Lyrics | Music | Singer(s) | Length |
|---|---|---|---|---|---|
| 1. | "Maa" | Tanveer Ghazi | Bickram Ghosh | Papon | 4:24 |
| 2. | "Kaise Kahoon" | Tanveer Ghazi | Bickram Ghosh | Prasamita Mantri | 4:21 |
| 3. | "Sawan Rut Aayo" | Tanveer Ghazi | Bickram Ghosh | Shubha Mudgal | 5:18 |
| 4. | "Bhalobasha Gaan" | Anindya Chatterjee | Bickram Ghosh | Anindya Chatterjee and Ujjaini Mukherjee | 4:02 |
| Total length: | | | | | 18:08 |

The soundtrack for Dear Maa was composed by renowned percussionist Bickram Ghosh, marking his first collaboration with director Aniruddha Roy Chowdhury. The album features four tracks with a total duration of 18 minutes and 8 seconds, released under Eternal Sounds on 7 July 2025.

== Themes ==
Dear Maa explores unconventional perspectives on motherhood, particularly through the lens of adoption. The film examines whether maternal connection requires biological ties or can develop through caregiving and emotional investment. Director Aniruddha Roy Chowdhury described the film as exploring "bonds beyond blood" and "the connection between souls stronger than blood ties."

The narrative also addresses workplace equality and societal expectations about women balancing career and motherhood. Brinda's character embodies the conflict many professional women face between ambition and cultural pressures toward domesticity.

== Release ==
=== Theatrical ===
Dear Maa was released theatrically on 18 July 2025. The film received a wide release across Bengal and was also distributed in North America and Canada through a special arrangement, playing in over 50 theaters across these regions.

=== Marketing ===
The marketing campaign included teaser and trailer releases that highlighted the emotional conflict between mother and daughter. Promotional events included panel discussions about adoption in India, supported by brand partner Sunfeast Mom's Magic. The trailer received praise from prominent figures including Amitabh Bachchan, who appreciated its emotional depth and storytelling.

Special events included a grand premiere at PVR Inox South City in Kolkata and a poster launch at Hyatt Regency Kolkata.

== Reception ==
=== Box office ===
The film had an estimated budget of ₹4 crore and earned approximately ₹0.74 crore in its first two days of release, with ₹0.38 crore on day one and ₹0.36 crore on day two. Director Aniruddha Roy Chowdhury expressed satisfaction with the film's box office performance, noting its steady collections and positive audience response.

=== Critical response ===
Dear Maa received generally positive reviews from critics. The Times of India praised Jaya Ahsan's "restrained yet textured performance" and noted that "Chowdhury handles the delicate subject matter with sensitivity, creating a film that resonates deeply with contemporary audiences."

Outlook India commended the film's "admirably unsentimental, candid gaze at maternal hesitation" and called Ahsan's performance "terrific," noting that "she brings remarkable depth to a character grappling with complex emotions about motherhood."

The film's handling of adoption themes received particular attention, with critics noting its thoughtful approach to the social and legal intricacies of adoption in India. Anandabazar Patrika highlighted Chowdhury's direction, stating that "he creates a nuanced narrative that challenges conventional notions of family and motherhood while maintaining emotional authenticity throughout."

=== Audience response ===
Audience responses were generally favorable, with many viewers mentioning the film's emotional impact and sensitive handling of adoption themes. The film was also noted for generating discussion about adoption practices and perceptions of motherhood in India.
