= Aschhe Abar Shabor =

2018 Indian Bengali action thriller film

- Theatrical release poster
- Directed by: Arindam Sil
- Written by: Shirshendu Mukhopadhyay
- Screenplay by: Padmanabha Dasgupta; Arindam Sil
- Based on: Prajapatir Mrityu O Punorjanmo by Shirshendu Mukhopadhyay
- Produced by: Shrikant Mohta; Mahendra Soni
- Starring: Saswata Chatterjee; Subhrajit Dutta; Tuhina Das; Gaurav Chakrabarty
- Cinematography: Soumik Haldar
- Edited by: Sanjib Dutta
- Music by: Bickram Ghosh
- Production company: SVF Entertainment
- Distributed by: SVF Entertainment
- Release date: 19 January 2018
- Country: India
- Language: Bengali

Aschhe Abar Shabor (transl. Shabor is coming back again) is a 2018 Indian Bengali-language crime thriller film directed by Arindam Sil. It is the sequel to 2016 film Eagoler Chokh and the third installment in the Goenda Shabor film series. The film was released on 19 January 2018. It is based on Prajapatir Mrityu O Punorjanmo, a story written by Shirshendu Mukhopadhyay.

== Plot ==
The story begins with three young ladies — Sofia, Uma and Joyi who attend a party together with all of them hooking with different partners. A series of murders haunting the city with two women killed at Beniapukur and Burrabuzar, Sofia was murdered later. While investigating, Police found a dating site with Sofia was associated. Kolkata Police detective Shabor Dasgupta is entrusted with the daunting task of solving the mystery when suddenly another similar murder occurred in Chandannagar. Under orders from DIG Rajat Gupta, ACP Shabor Dasgupta, Detective Department, Lalbajar, Kolkata Police along with his assistants Senior Inspector Nandalal Roy and Senior Inspector Sanjib Das travel to Chandannager to investigate the possible serial killer who murdered Rinku Roy and Sofia and the other two. Bijoy Sen who is much hated by the locals and was in a relationship with Rinku is suspected of murdering her and is beaten severely at his house by the locals. Shabor Dasgupta forces Nandalal Roy to create a dating site at the same website as Sopia to contact with Sopia's friends and also to find more about a fake profile of Bijoy. Rinku's grandma says Shabor that she had seen someone arriving on a blue car from her window at Bijoy Sen's house before Rinku arrived at that place riding her cycle the night before Rinku was murdered. Shabor questions Sumana about her husband Bijoy Sen.

On the other hand, Nandu goes on a date with one of Sopia's friend Uma. Next day Nandu gets a sudden call from Uma while he was on the street with ACP Shabor and Sanjib saying that she was being attacked by someone named Bijoy Sen and just when she was about to say her location she is stopped and killed in a similar way like the previous two cases. Shabor convinces Sumana to meet Biyoy, in case she can bring out any information from Bijoy regarding his involvement. Learning about Sharon, ACP Shabor and Nandu travel to Lucknow to question Sharon and later learns that Sharon and her boyfriend Sujit do not live in together anymore upon accidentally finding Sharon's advance on Bijoy. Sumana meets Bijoy only to feel sympathy for him. Uma's roommate Joyi finds some selfie about Uma's murderer. ACP Shabor asks Joyi to be the bait and blackmail all possible suspects. As Joyi welcomes the suspect to their house, the suspect attacks suddenly and ACP and his team comes to the rescue and chases the criminal behind these crimes to find out its one of her friends, who loved her. Sumana wants to meet with Bijoy once again and finally after meeting him they reconcile. ACP Shabor Dasgupta explains how the negligence of parents about their kids and how pursuing their own interests in turn leaves the child vulnerable and alone in their vital period of childhood.

== Cast ==
- Saswata Chatterjee as ACP Shabor Dasgupta Kolkata Police
- Subhrajeet Dutta as SI Nandalal Roy (Kolkata Police)
- Gaurav Chakrabarty as SI Sanjib Das (Kolkata Police)
- Indraneil Sengupta as Bijoy Sen
- Arindam Sil as DIG Rajat Gupta
- Lolita Chatterjee as Rinku's grandmother
- Anamika Chakraborty as Sofia
- Arunima Ghosh as Sumana, Bijoy's wife
- Anjana Basu as Sharon
- Mir Afsar Ali as Sujit Dutta
- Diti Saha as Rinku Roy
- Darshana Banik as Rinku's friend
- Anindya Chatterjee as Rinku's friend
- Prantik Banerjee as Rinku's friend
- Tuhina Das as Huma
- Priyanka Mondal as Jui, Huma's roommate
- Joydip Kundu as Sanat
- Debopriyo Mukherjee as Peter Mondal

== Production ==
After success of Eagoler Chokh a sequel has been confirmed by director Arindam Sil. In August 2017, the director told the media, the shooting of the third installment of Goenda Shabor franchise will start from 7 September 2017. The film has been titled Aschhe Abar Shabor, and will be based on the novel Prajapatir Mrityu O Punorjanmo by Shirshendu Mukhopadhyay. After completing its first schedule in West Bengal, the team will fly for Lucknow to shoot rest of the part. Saswata Chatterjee, Subhrajit Dutta and Gaurav Chakrabarty returning for the sequel as their respective characters with Indraneil Sengupta, Anindya Chatterjee, Anjana Basu and Mir Afsar Ali with major characters. Shooting started from early September, for a release on 19 January 2018.

== Marketing ==
The first look poster with some plot synopsis has been revealed by director Sil, on 12 October 2017. The motion poster has been published by director Sil on 13 October. The theatrical poster of the film release on 15 November 2017

== Soundtrack ==
| No. | Title | Singer (s) | Length |
|---|---|---|---|
| 1. | "Kaise Manaun Shyam" | Barnali Chattopadhyay | 2:48 |
| 2. | "Bhanga Mon Bhanga Chand" | Iman Chakraborty, Timir Biswas, Ambarish Das | 3:10 |

== Critical reception ==
The Times of India rated it 3 stars out of five. The film got generally favorable reviews from critics. Diganto Patrika gave it 3.5 stars out of five, and said, "The film is equally accurate in Drama and thriller than its previous installments." The Quint gave it 2.5 stars out of five, and said, "Watch Aschhe Abar Sabor for the glimpses of Saswata's sass and for the sake of nostalgia, if you must. Otherwise, it is quite a disappointing outing for an otherwise fabulous director."

== See also ==
- Ebar Shabor
- Har Har Byomkesh
- Byomkesh Pawrbo
