= Tirandaj Shabor =

2022 Indian Bengali-language film by Arindam Sil

- Directed by: Arindam Sil
- Written by: Arindam Sil; Padmanabha Dasgupta
- Produced by: Rupa Dutta
- Starring: Saswata Chatterjee; Subhrajit Dutta; Nigel Akkara; Devlina Kumar
- Cinematography: Ayan Sil
- Edited by: Sanglap Bhowmik
- Music by: Bickram Ghosh
- Production company: Camellia Productions
- Distributed by: Shree Venkatesh Films
- Release date: 27 May 2022
- Running time: 113 minutes
- Country: India
- Language: Bengali

Tirandaj Shabor is a 2022 Indian Bengali-language crime thriller film directed by Arindam Sil based on Shirshendu Mukhopadhyay’s novel Tirandaj. It is the sequel to 2018 film Aschhe Abar Shabor and the fourth installment of Goenda Shabor film series. The film was released on 27 May 2022 under the banner of Camellia Productions.

== Plot ==
A cab driver Sumit Ghoshal rushes into a police station with a passenger who is seriously ill. Immediately after this, the investigating officer finds him dead. Police suspect Sumit for the incident. ACP Shabor Dasgupta and his assistant Nanda starts investigation and discovers that there are number of mysterious characters close to the victim Sitanath Samaddar. Samaddar has a dark past and there are many suspects who can take revenge.

== Cast ==
- Saswata Chatterjee as Shabor Dasgupta
- Subhrajit Dutta as Nanda
- Nigel Akkara as Sumit Ghoshal/ Bulu Da
- Arindam Sil as Sitanath Samaddar
- Chandan Sen as Pareshnath Chakraborty
- Poulomi Das as Sonali Basu
- Saranya Kar as Jamuna
- Debjani Chatterjee as Papia Samaddar
- Devlina Kumar as Pritha/Rumki
- Joydip Kundu as Sukanta Ghosh

== Soundtrack ==
Tirandaj Shabor

Soundtrack album by Bickram Ghosh
- Released: 2022
- Genre: Film soundtrack
- Length: 16:27
- Language: Bengali
- Label: Times Music Bangla

Track listing
No.	Title	Singer(s)	Length
1.	"Laglo Nesha"	Timir Biswas, Bickram Ghosh	4:04
2.	"Shabor Theme (Saxophone)"	Bickram Ghosh	1:56
3.	"Lag Lag"	Ujjaini Mukherjee, Bickram Ghosh	2:34
4.	"Paglare Tui Jhoom"	Timir Biswas, Bickram Ghosh	3:40
5.	"Shabor Returns"	Bickram Ghosh	3:01
6.	"Shabor Theme (Symphony)"	Bickram Ghosh	1:12
Total length:			16:27
