= Eagoler Chokh =

2016 film by Arindam Sil

- Theatrical release poster
- Directed by: Arindam Sil
- Written by: Shirshendu Mukhopadhyay
- Based on: Igoler Chokh by Shirshendu Mukhopadhyay
- Produced by: Shrikant Mohta; Mahendra Soni
- Starring: Saswata Chatterjee; Subhrajit Dutta; Jaya Ahsan; Payel Sarkar; Anirban Bhattacharya; Gaurav Chakrabarty
- Cinematography: Soumik Haldar
- Edited by: Sujay Dutta Roy
- Music by: Bickram Ghosh
- Production company: Shree Venkatesh Films
- Distributed by: Shree Venkatesh Films
- Release date: 12 August 2016
- Running time: 117 minutes
- Country: India
- Language: Bengali
- Box office: ₹5.6 crore

Eagoler Chokh (English: Eyes of Eagle; alternatively known as Goenda Shabor: Eagoler Chokh) is a 2016 Indian Bengali-language crime thriller film directed by Arindam Sil. It is the sequel to 2015 film Ebar Shabor and the second installment of Goenda Shabor film series. The film is based on a story of same name, written by Shirshendu Mukhopadhyay.

== Synopsis ==
ACP Shabor Dasgupta and his assistant Nanda go on a hunt, searching for a young woman murderer. Trapped in a maze of lies and deceit, Dasgupta suspects the rich entrepreneur Bishan Roy and three women connected to him. Each of them knew the murdered woman Nandini very well. As Dasgupta delves deep into the mystery, he ends up getting new insight into human psychology and in turn, solving complexities of his own mind.

== Cast ==
- Saswata Chatterjee as Shabor Dasgupta
- Subhrajit Dutta as Nanda (Shabor's assistant)
- Jaya Ahsan as Shivangi Roy
- Payel Sarkar as Nandini Sen
- Anirban Bhattacharya as Bishan Roy
- Gaurav Chakrabarty as sub-inspector Sanjib Das (Special appearance)
- Arunima Ghosh as Rita Fernandez
- Riya Banik as Jahnabi
- Joydeep Kundu
- June Malia as a Psychiatrist Madhurima Sen
- Ushoshi Sengupta as Shyamangi

== Soundtrack ==
Track listing
No.	Title	Singer	Length
1.	"Raater Majhar"	Armeen Musa	2:03
2.	"Dil Mehfil"	Ujjaini	2:42

== Critical reception ==
The film got mostly positive reviews from critics and audience. Sangbad Pratidin gave the film 4 stars out of 5. Anandalok magazine gave the film 4 out of 5 stars. Sulekha gave the film 3 out of 5 stars. Bookmyshow gave the film 4.5 out of 5. The Times of India gave the film 3.5 stars.

== Awards and nominations ==
Award	Category	Recipient(s)	Result
Filmfare Awards East 2017	Filmfare Award for Best Film - Bengali	Eagoler Chokh	Nominated
Filmfare Awards East 2017	Filmfare Award for Best Director - Bengali	Arindam Sil	Nominated
Filmfare Awards East 2017	Filmfare Award for Best Actress - Bengali	Joya Ahsan	Nominated
Filmfare Awards East 2017	Filmfare Award for Best Supporting Actor - Bengali	Anirban Bhattacharya	Won
Filmfare Awards East 2017	Filmfare Award for Best Dialogue - Bengali	Arindam Sil; Padmanabha Dasgupta	Nominated
Filmfare Awards East 2017	Filmfare Award for Best Screenplay - Bengali	Arindam Sil; Padmanabha Dasgupta	Nominated
Filmfare Awards East 2017	Filmfare Award for Best Editing - Bengali	Sujay Dutta Ray	Nominated
Filmfare Awards East 2017	Filmfare Award for Best Background Score - Bengali	Bickram Ghosh	Nominated
Filmfare Awards East 2017	Filmfare Award for Best Cinematography - Bengali	Soumik Haldar	Nominated
Filmfare Awards East 2017	Filmfare Award for Best Sound Design - Bengali	Anindit Roy; Adeep Singh Manki	Nominated

== Sequel ==
After success of Eagoler Chokh a sequel has been confirmed by director Arindam Sil. In August 2017, the director told the media, the shooting of the third installment of Goenda Shabor franchise will start from 7 September 2017. The film has been titled Aschhe Abar Shabor, and will be based on the novel Prajapatir Mrityu O Punorjanmo by Shirshendu Mukhopadhyay. After completing its first schedule in West Bengal, the team will fly for Lucknow to shoot rest of the part. Saswata Chatterjee, Subhrajit Dutta and Gourav Chakrabarty returning for the sequel as their respective characters with Indraneil Sengupta, Anindya Chatterjee, Anjana Basu and Mir Afsar Ali with major characters. Shooting started from early September, for release in January 2018.

== See also ==
- Aborto
- Ebar Shabor
- Har Har Byomkesh
