= Shabash Feluda =

- Genre: Crime thriller
- Written by: Padmanabha Dasgupta
- Directed by: Arindam Sil
- Starring: Parambrata Chattopadhyay; Ritwick Chakraborty; Biplab Chatterjee; Topher Collins; Rwitobroto Mukherjee; Arindam Sil; Sauraseni Maitra; Rudranil Ghosh
- Music by: Bickram Ghosh
- Country of origin: India
- Original language: Bengali
- No. of seasons: 1
- No. of episodes: 10

Production
- Producers: Parambrata Chattopadhyay; Ashok Kumar Dhanuka
- Cinematography: Anirban Chatterjee
- Editor: Sanglap Bhowmik
- Production company: Eskay Movies

Original release
- Network: ZEE5
- Release: 5 May 2023

Shabash Feluda is a 2023 Bengali detective thriller series starring Parambrata Chattopadhyay as the titular character, Feluda. The series also features Ritwick Chakraborty, Biplab Chatterjee, Rwitobroto Mukherjee, Rudranil Ghosh, and Sauraseni Maitra in significant roles. Directed by Arindam Sil and produced by Roadshow, the series is based on Satyajit Ray’s Feluda novel ‘Gangtokey Gondogol’ published in 1971 and premiered on ZEE5 on 5 May 2023.

== Plot ==
The story is centered on Feluda (Parambrata Chattopadhyay) and Topshe (Rwitobroto Mukherjee) who are on a family vacation in Gangtok. During their trip, they meet Sasadhar Bose who asks Feluda to investigate the sudden and brutal death of his business partner, Selvankar. As Feluda delves deeper into the case, he suspects foul play and discovers that the key to solving the mystery lies in an ancient artifact called Yamantak, which contains a hidden message.The narrative follows Feluda as he navigates through the complexities of the case, which involves a grieving father, a distant son, and a ruthless killer who will stop at nothing to get their hands on the treasure. The series showcases Feluda in a new light, as he races against time to uncover the true culprit behind the murder and bring justice to the victim.

== Cast ==
- Parambrata Chattopadhyay as Pradosh Chandra Mitter (Feluda)
- Ritwick Chakraborty as Sashadhar Bose
- Biplab Chatterjee as Sidhu Jyatha
- Topher Collins as Helmut Unger
- Rudranil Ghosh as Nishikanto Sarkar
- Sauraseni Maitra as Rinchen Gompo
- Debopriyo Mukherjee as Ganesh Gaitonde
- Kamaleswar Mukherjee as Mohandas Mehta
- Rwitobroto Mukherjee as Topesh Ranjan Mitter (Topshe)
- Arindam Sil as Shivkumar Selvankar

== Production ==
=== Casting ===
Parambrata Chatterjee has been cast to portray the famous Bengali detective Feluda, with Rwitobroto Mukherjee taking on the role of Topshe. Sauraseni Maitra also has a significant part to play, while Rudranil Ghosh and Ritwick Chakraborty have been cast in pivotal roles. Parambrata will be portraying a modern Feluda, with the story being adapted to take place in 2017. Feluda has now embraced modern technology, using a smartphone and a smartwatch to aid him in his investigations.

=== Filming ===
Filming for 'Shabash Feluda' commenced in Gangtok in January 2023 and concluded on 20 March of the same year.

=== Release ===
The official announcement of the release date for the series was made on 27 April 2023 by ZEE5. The makers shared a poster on social media and disclosed that the series would be streaming on ZEE5 from 5 May 2023. Lead actor Parambrata revealed a sneak peek of the teaser on social media. Parambrata and Rudranil are shown in the teaser.

The trailer of the series was launched on 25 April 2023. Originally, the series was supposed to release on 15 April 2023, on the occasion of Poila Baisakh. However, it was later postponed to 5 May 2023.

== Episodes ==
=== Season 1 ===
No.	Title	Directed by	Original release date
1	"Catch-22"	Arindam Sil	5 May 2023
Feluda and Topshe embark on a journey to Sikkim, where they uncover the demise of a businessman in a mishap. With a suspicion of foul play, they set off on their Gangtok escapade.
2	"One in a Million Chance"	Arindam Sil	5 May 2023
Following businessman Selvankar's untimely demise, a priceless Yamantaka idol goes missing. The authorities in Mumbai uncover a connection between Selvankar's perfume company, S.S. Chemicals, and drug trafficking.
3	"Secret Intestine"	Arindam Sil	5 May 2023
As Feluda and Topshe's investigation into the missing Yamantaka intensifies, police officer Rinchen Gonpo becomes suspicious of them. Meanwhile, a foreign national photographer named Helmut Ungar shows Feluda a picture of the missing item.
4	"Nishikanto's Nightmare"	Arindam Sil	5 May 2023
Feluda is tasked with investigating the murder of Selvankar's employer by his employee Sashadhar Bose. Meanwhile, the Mumbai police have identified a new suspect by the name of Ashwini Kaviraj.
5	"Sick Monster"	Arindam Sil	5 May 2023
The individual who possessed the authentic Yamantaka, Nishikanto Sarkar, was assaulted after receiving a warning of impending death. Simultaneously, Feluda was abducted by several individuals wearing masks.
6	"Planchette"	Arindam Sil	5 May 2023
Feluda pays a visit to Dr. Vaidya, an astrologer, who uses his abilities to communicate with Selvankar's spirit and uncover the identity of his killer. Can he reveal who committed the murder?
7	"Altered Truth"	Arindam Sil	5 May 2023
Rinchen is currently in a predicament as she searches for the elusive Yamantaka. In the midst of her search, she detains Helmut on grounds of suspicion. Meanwhile, Feluda and Topshe conduct an experiment in an attempt to unravel the mystery surrounding Selvankar's murder.
8	"The Chase Begins"	Arindam Sil	5 May 2023
During Helmut's questioning, there was an unexpected twist while Feluda apprehended a suspect in Nishikanto's chamber.
9	"The Trap"	Arindam Sil	5 May 2023
Feluda, Topshe, Nishikanto, Helmut, and Sashadhar arrive at Lakpa Lodge, only to discover that Dr. Vaidya is nowhere to be found. However, they are taken aback to find his walking stick left behind.
10	"Uproar in Gangtok"	Arindam Sil	5 May 2023
During Feluda's interrogation, the intricate web of lies was unraveled and the base of the petal-shaped idol was successfully retrieved and turned over to the Sikkim police.
