= The Music Room (album) =

Studio album by Sonu Nigam – Bickram Ghosh
- Released: 16 December 2014
- Genre: Indie pop / Muddy Electronica
- Length: 34.16
- Label: Times Music Sonu Chawliya Bhojasar
- Producer: Sonu Nigam – Bickram Ghosh

Sonu Nigam – Bickram Ghosh chronology
Jal (2014)	The Music Room (2014)	Happy Anniversary (2016)

The Music Room is a 2014 album composed by the Indian singer-songwriter Sonu Nigam and tabla percussionist Bickram Ghosh. The album was released on 16 December 2014 on the Times Music label. The album, which was over four years in the making, is in a style the duo calls Muddy Electronica, according to an interview that appeared in the Mumbai Mirror.

The album features seven tracks, all in the voice of Sonu. The lyrics of all the songs have been penned by Sonu Nigam except the Gujarati language song Walida, the lyrics of which are written by Shruti Pathak. When interviewed by Radioandmusic.com about the presence of that song on the album, Ghosh said, "It is music; let us not limit ourselves to a single language. We come across people who listen to many other languages." The album also consists of a song titled Khamakha, notable for being set to nine beats.

In less than 24 hrs of release The Music Room had reached no.1 position on Indipop Charts on iTunes. The composer duo celebrated the success of the album ‘The Music Room’ along with their friends in the industry by throwing a lavish party in Mumbai.

== Track listing ==
No.	Title	Length	Singer(s)	Lyrics	Composer(s)
1	Saiyyan Bina	6:59	Sonu Nigam - Bickram Ghosh	Sonu Nigam	Sonu Nigam - Bickram Ghosh
2	Paane Chala Tha	5:12	Sonu Nigam - Bickram Ghosh	Sonu Nigam	Sonu Nigam - Bickram Ghosh
3	Khamakha	4:36	Sonu Nigam - Bickram Ghosh	Sonu Nigam	Sonu Nigam - Bickram Ghosh
4	Walida	4:41	Sonu Nigam - Bickram Ghosh	Shruti Pathak	Sonu Nigam - Bickram Ghosh
5	Spyder-man	4:18	Sonu Nigam - Bickram Ghosh	Sonu Nigam	Sonu Nigam - Bickram Ghosh
6	Tumhi The Mere	5:38	Sonu Nigam - Bickram Ghosh	Sonu Nigam	Sonu Nigam - Bickram Ghosh
7	Laila Ko Hara Do	4:12	Sonu Nigam - Bickram Ghosh	Sonu Nigam	Sonu Nigam - Bickram Ghosh

== Critical reception ==
- The Chennai, India-based 'New Indian Express' calls the album "An Iconic collaboration that introduces music lovers to a new and original Genre".
- The Pune, India-based 'Sakal Times' called the songs "Very fresh in terms of Music."
- The Kolkata, India-based online news portal called the album "Superb" and recognized singer Sonu Nigam as "The Finest Voice of Music".
- The Milliblog '100 Word Blog' provided a favorable review - "In this album they truly soar and produce a whopper!"
- The Album has also received favorable reviews on Amazon's India site.
