= Shabor Dasgupta =

Fictional directive character by Shirshendu Mukhopadhyay

ACP Shabor Dasgupta
- Goenda Shabor character
- First appearance: Rwin
- Last appearance: Tirandaj Shabor (2022)
- Created by: Shirshendu Mukhopadhyay
- Portrayed by: Saswata Chatterjee

In-universe information
- Gender: Male
- Title: ACP
- Occupation: Detective
- Religion: Hinduism
- Nationality: Indian

Shabor Dasgupta is a Bengali fictional detective character created by novelist Shirshendu Mukhopadhyay in the Goenda Shabor series. This figure is popularly known as Goenda Shabor.

== Character ==
Shabor Dasgupta is an Assistant Commissioner, Detective Department of Kolkata Police. He is a cool and intelligent officer without having a super image like other fictional detectives. He investigates in a realistic way, cracking mysteries with psychology. Sometimes it appears that he is bereft of all passions and has no private life or affections. Shabor's assistant Nanda helps him. Like writer Mukhopadhyay, Shabor is a teetotaller, non-smoker and bachelor.

== Stories ==
- Bikeler Mrityu
- Kapurush
- Rwin
- Aloy Chhayay
- Shiri Bhenge Bhenge
- Prajapatir Mrityu O Punarjanmo
- Kaalo Beral Shada Beral
- Podokkhep
- Rup
- Marich
- Eagoler Chokh
- Tirandaj
- Amake Biye Korben?

== Film adaptation ==
Director Arindam Sil made the Goenda Shabor (film series) in Bengali based on the Shabor stories. Actor Saswata Chatterjee portrays the role of the protagonist Shabor. The first film, Ebar Shabor, was released in 2015, the second film, Eagoler Chokh, was released in 2016 and the third, Aschhe Abar Shabor was released in January 2018. On 27 May 2022, the fourth film of Shabor series Tirandaj Shabor was released.
