= Tarini Khuro =

Fictional character

- Tarini Khuro character
- Tarini Khuro
- First appearance: Dumnigarh-er Manushkheko
- Last appearance: Golpo boliye Tarinikhuro
- Created by: Satyajit Ray
- Portrayed by: Subhendu Chatterjee; Paran Bandyopadhyay; Paresh Rawal; Saswata Chattopadhyay
- Voiced by: Paran Bandyopadhyay

In-universe information
- Full name: Tarini Charan Bandopadhyay
- Gender: Male
- Title: Bandopadhyay
- Religion: Hinduism
- Nationality: Indian

Tarini Khuro is a fictional character created by Satyajit Ray. The literal meaning of Tarini Khuro is respected uncle Tarini. Khuro in old colloquial Bengali means paternal uncle. The full name of Tarini Khuro is Tarini Charan Bandopadhyay. Tarini khuro's adventure stories have a touch of supernatural forces in them. Ray's earlier creations were Feluda and Professor Shonku. This character is central to about fifteen stories written by Ray.

== Character ==
Tarini Khuro is an aged bachelor living Beniatolla Lane, at College Street in Kolkata (or what was then Calcutta). He first lived in Dhaka from there he was known to the father of the story-teller (Paltu). His full name is Tarini Charan Banerjee (Bengali: তারিণীচরণ ব্যানার্জী). He is a very efficient story-teller. He tells stories supposedly based on his long professional life. The audience is a bunch of 5 young guys.

The range of the stories are varied — from ghost stories (many of which are not horror stories though) to comedy stories. Most of the stories portray the quick wit of Tarini Khuro in the face of imminent problems/dangers whereas some stories depict how Tarini Khuro had some close shaves by the stroke of luck. Tarini Khuro worked fifty six different trades, both business and service trades, in thirty-three cities all over India. This resulted in his unending stock of stories full of strange incidents which can easily surpass two volumes of The Arabian Nights. There is a little exaggeration in his storytelling for the sake of art. He has not stayed in the same job for more than a period of one year. At the age of 64 he settled down in a flat in Beniatola Lane in Kolkata.

Similarly to Premendra Mitra's GhanaDa, Tarini Khuro enjoys telling tall tales, although unlike GhanaDa, there was no way of ascertaining the veracity of these stories. He has had an adventurous life and largely avoided the tremendous political (and social) upheavals in twentieth century India. Tarini was born in a Bengali middle class family and was well-to-do in terms of inheritance and social networks, although he seeks out occupations all over India (in other words, he does not limit himself to Bengal). He regularly tells tales in order to get his afternoon tea and snacks due to his lack of a pensionable income. His audience consists of five school children in a middle class dual income Bengali family, who did not have time to spend with their children during the afternoons or evening.

== Book ==
Tarinikhuror Kirtikolap (Meaning The Feats of Tarini Khuro) is a book written by Satyajit Ray which is the compilation of eight Tarini khuro stories. The book was first published in September, 1985 by Ananda Publishers. Later all the stories of "Tarini Khuro" were included in "Golpo 101" (Meaning One Hundred and One Stories), a book by Satyajit Ray. And there is a book, Tarini Khuror Abhijan (Meaning "The Adventure of Tarini Khuro") contains some stories of Tarinikhuro.

== Plot ==
Paltu is a teenage boy who is the storyteller. Tarini khuro is not Paltu's uncle, but from Paltu's childhood he has seen Tarini khuro visit their place quite frequently. Before Paltu was born, Tarinkhuro and his family were neighbours in Dhaka. Hence, he was called khuro or uncle by Paltu's father. He has remained khuro or uncle for Paltu and his five friends as well. Napla, one of the five friends of Paltu once called him grandpa only to be scolded by Tarini khuro. He asked him to call him uncle or khuro since he was fitter than a lot of young men.

Tarini khuro visits Paltu's place and at once the news goes out to the other five friends. They all gather to hear the amazing stories from khuro. Tarinikhuro tells his amazing stories while enjoying the tea without milk and sugar as preferred by him, which is delivered by Paltu's servant Lakshman. He also smokes his favourite brand of export quality bidi.

== Adventures ==
Below are excerpts from a few of Tarini khuro's adventures.

- Sheth Gangaram-er Dhan Daulat

Tarini khuro goes to Ajmer to work as a secretary of Seth Gangaram who is a patient of his uncle and very wealthy. Gangaram was a trader of jewels and has wealthy items like the locket of Jahangir. Gangaram appointed Khuro as the teacher of his notorious youngest son Mahabir. Mahabir did not like him at first and went on to throw scorpions at him but Khuro with his courage won his heart. Later on dacoit Tota Singh robbed Sethji and incidentally looked exactly like Khuro as Khuro had a Rajasthani style moustache at that point in time. The police were tipped of about Khuro being the dacoit and came to arrest him. But Mahabir saved Khuro by giving him sleeping pills in his drink and shaving his moustache and head as he was asleep.

- Kheloyar Tarini khuro

Tarini khuro is appointed as the secretary of Virendrapratap Singh, king of Martandapur in Uttar Pradesh. Virendrapratap's father Rajendrapratap used to be a skilled cricketer in his day and had gone to England to watch the great Ranjitsinhji play. Ranjitsinhji had presented him a bat of his with which he had scored 202 runs for Sussex against Middlesex. Khuro has to play in a match against the British Planters' team for the Martandapur Cricket Club at the king's special request. Ranjitsinhji's amazing bat does the trick as khuro feels Ranjitsinhji himself has come inside him to play and eventually they win the match despite having a weaker team.

== Tarini Khuro series ==
- Doomnigar-er Manuskheko (The Man-eater of Doomnigarh)
- Conway castle-er Pretatma (The Phantom of Conway Castle)
- Seth Gongaram-er Dhanodoulot (The treasure of Seth Gangaram)
- Tarini Khuro O Betaal (Uncle Tarini and Betal)
- Lucknow-er Duel (A Duel in Lucknow)
- Dhumalgar-er Hunting Lodge (The Hunting Lodge of Dhumalgarh)
- Khelowaar Tarini Khuro (Tarini Khuro as a Sportsman)
- Tollywood-e Tarini Khuro (Tarini Khuro in Tollywood)
- Juti (The Two Comedians)
- Maharajah Tarini khuro (Uncle Tarini, the Maharaja)
- Tarini khuro o Oindrojalik (Tarini khuro & The Magician)
- Norris Saheb-er Bungalow (The Bungalow of Mr. Norris)
- Mohim Sannal-er Ghotona (The Affair of Mohim Sannal)
- Gonotkar Tarini khuro (Fortune Teller Tarini khuro)
- Galpoboliye Tarini Khuro (The Storyteller Tarini Khuro)

According to Satyajit Ray Golpo 101

== Other characters ==
- Paltu - Khuro comes to Paltu's house in Ballygunge to tell his stories.
- Napla - Paltu's friend and listener of Khuro's stories. He is the smartest of the lot and the only one who questions and taunts khuro when he goes on exaggerating the facts.
- Bhulu - Paltu's friend and listener of Khuro's stories.
- Chatpati - Paltu's friend and listener of Khuro's stories.
- Sunanda - Paltu's friend and listener of Khuro's stories.
- Lakshman - Paltu's servant.

== Films ==
=== Jekhane Bhooter Bhoy (2012) ===
This is the first feature film based on Tarini Khuro, which is directed by Sandip Ray. This is an anthology film with three stories- Satyajit Ray's Anath Babur Bhoy and Brown Saheber Bari. The last one was Sharadindu Bandyopadhyay’s Bhut Bhabishyat.(initially four stories were supposed to be filmed, but the fourth one, Lucknowe Duel was dropped later to avoid the length). Tarini Khuro was played by Paran Bandyopadhyay.

=== The Storyteller (2022) ===
A Hindi-language featuring Paresh Rawal as Tarini Khuro was released in 2022. The film also features actor Adil Hussain. The film premiered at the 27th Busan International Film Festival in October 2022 and was released on 28 January 2025 on Disney+ Hotstar.

== Television ==
=== Juti (1997) ===
The story Juti was filmed in the Telefilm Series Satyajiter Goppo. Saswata Chattopadhyay was seen as Tarini Khuro.

=== Tollywoodey Tarinikhuro (2001) ===
Later Tollywoodey Tarinikhuro was filmed in the Satyajiter Priyo Goppo series. Portrayed by Subhendu Chatterjee and Saswata Chattopadhyay as Tarini Khuro.

== Cast and characters ==
Character	Films		Television	
Character	Jekhane Bhooter Bhoy (2012)	The Storyteller (TBA)	Juti (1992)	Tollywoodey Tarinikhuro (2001)
=== The story teller and listeners ===
Tarini Khuro	Paran Bandyopadhyay	Paresh Rawal	Saswata Chatterjee	Subhendu Chatterjee (older); Saswata Chatterjee (younger)
Poltu	Subham Das		Unknown	Unknown
Nyapla	Ayus Paul		Unknown	Unknown
Bhulu	Amit Das		Unknown	Unknown
Sunanda	Aritra Ghosh		Unknown	Unknown
Chatpati	Ayan Shur		Unknown	Unknown
Lakshman (The servant)	Subham Das		Unknown	Unknown
The Gujarati businessman		Adil Hussain		
=== Anath Babur Bhoy ===
Anathbandhu Mitra	Dwijen Bandopadhyay			
Sitesh Chatterjee	Subhrajit Dutta			
=== Brown Saheber Bari ===
Ranjan Sengupta	Abir Chatterjee			
Anikendra Bhoumick	Bhaswar Chatterjee			
Dr. Larkin	Lew Hilt			
Hrishikesh Banerjee	Biswajit Chakraborty			
=== Bhut Bhabishyat ===
Pratap Sarkar	Saswata Chatterjee			
Nandadulal Nandy	Paran Bandyopadhyay			
Komola	Mousumi Bhattacharya			
Gopidulal Nandy	Pradip Mukherjee			
Nikunja Pal	Panchu Gopal Dey			

== Radio ==
In Sunday Suspense series of 98.3 Radio Mirchi (Kolkata), many Tarini Khuro stories has been performed by Paran Bandopadhyay, Mir Afsar Ali, Deep (RJ), Richard (DJ) and various other artists.

=== Film ===
- The story Juti was filmed in the Telefilm Series Satyajiter Goppo. Saswata Chattopadhyay was seen as tarini khuro.
- Later Tollywoodey Tarinikhuro was filmed in the Satyajiter Priyo Goppo series. Portrayed by Subhendu Chatterjee and Saswata Chattopadhyay as Tarini khuro.
- In the 2012 film Jekhane Bhooter Bhoy, Tarini Khuro's character portrayed by Paran Bandopadhyay.

== See also ==
- Satyajit Ray
- Feluda
- Feluda in other media
- Literary works of Satyajit Ray
- Professor Shonku
- Tarini Khuro in other media
- Kolkata culture
- Culture of Bengal
- Culture of West Bengal
- Bengali literature
- History of Bengali literature
- List of Bengali-language authors (chronological)
