= Jekhane Bhooter Bhoy =

2012 Indian Bengali film

- Movie poster
- Directed by: Sandip Ray
- Screenplay by: Sandip Ray
- Based on: Sharadindu Bandyopadhyay’s Bhut Bhabishyat; Satyajit Ray's Brown Saheber Bari and Anath Babur Bhoy
- Produced by: Shree Venkatesh Films and Surinder Films
- Starring: Paran Bandyopadhyay; Saswata Chatterjee; Abir Chatterjee; Bhaswar Chatterjee
- Narrated by: Paran Bandyopadhayay
- Cinematography: Sasanka Palit
- Edited by: Subrata Roy
- Music by: Sandip Ray
- Release date: 21 December 2012 (Kolkata)
- Running time: 94 minutes
- Country: India
- Language: Bengali

Jekhane Bhooter Bhoy (English: Where there is a fear of ghosts) is a 2012 Indian Bengali-language anthology horror film directed by Sandip Ray. There are three short ghost stories in this film.

== Plot ==
The film starts with Tarinikhuro or Tarinicharan Banerjee, one of Satyajit Ray's characters, telling some boys from his fanclub about ghosts. In the first and second stories the ghosts he talks about were Satyajit Ray's Anath Babur Bhoy and Brown Saheber Bari. The last one was Sharadindu Bandyopadhyay’s Bhoot Bhobishyot. (Initially four stories were supposed to be filmed, but the fourth one, Lucknow-er Duel was dropped later to avoid the length).

=== Anath Babur Bhoy ===
Anath Babur Bhoy (Anath Babu's Terror) revolves around the story of Anathbandhu Mitra, who is a ghost hunter. He, along with his friend, Sitesh Babu, narrate their experience regarding a dilapidated haunted house, Haldar Mansion, "Haldar Bari".

=== Brown Saheber Bari ===
Brown Saheber Bari (Mr. Brown's Cottage) is about "Simon", a mysterious entity whom the owner of the cottage, a British gentleman loved dearly.

=== Bhoot Bhobishyot ===
The story is based on a relationship between a writer and a 19th century ghost. It is a light-hearted story with a twist at the end.

== Cast ==
=== The story teller and listeners ===
- Paran Bandyopadhyay as Tarini Khuro
- Subham Das as Poltu
- Ayus Das as Nyapla
- Amit Das as Bhulu
- Aritra Ghosh as Sunanda
- Ayan Shur as Chatpati
- Bimal Ghosh as Lakshman (the servant)

=== Anath Babur Bhoy ===
- Dwijen Bandopadhyay as Anathbandhu Mitra
- Subhrajit Dutta as Sitesh Chatterjee
- Abanti Mohan Banerjee as Pranab Banerjee
- Haradhan Bose as Bharadwaj

=== Brown Saheber Bari ===
- Abir Chatterjee as Ranjan Sengupta
- Bhaswar Chatterjee as Anikendra Bhowmik
- Biswajit Chakraborty as Hrishikesh Banerjee
- Lew Hilt as Dr. Larkin
- Sanjiban Guha as Nitish Samaddar

=== Bhut Bhabishyat ===
- Saswata Chatterjee as Pratap Sarkar
- Paran Bandyopadhyay as Nandadulal Nandy
- Mousumi Bhattacharya as Komola
- Pradip Mukherjee as Gopidulal Nandy
- Panchu Gopal Dey as Nikunja Pal

== Filming ==
The film is produced by Shree Venkatesh Films and Surinder Films. The shooting of this film has been done in different places like Shantiniketan, Kalimpong, Raipur etc. The film released on 21 December 2012.

== See also ==
- Bhooter Bhabishyat, 2012 Bengali film
- Chaar
