= Shirshendu Mukhopadhyay =

Bengali author from India (born 1935)

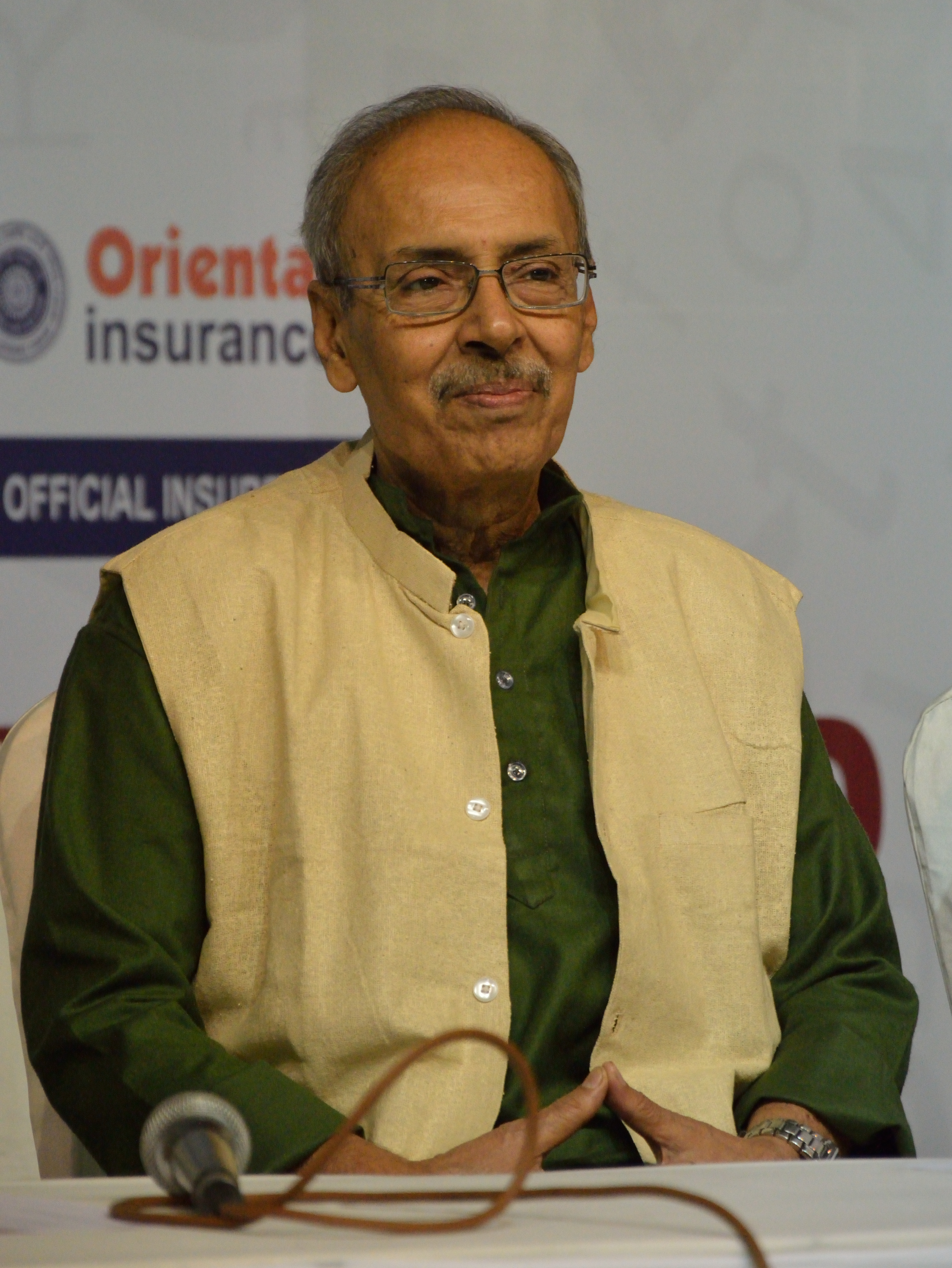
- Mukhopadhyay in February 2014
- Born: 2 November 1935 (age 90); Mymensingh, Bengal Presidency, British India (present-day Bangladesh)
- Education: Calcutta University
- Occupations: Author, Teacher
- Notable work: Baithaki, Manabjamin, Durbin, Parthib
- Awards: Ananda Purashkar; Sahitya Academy

Shirshendu Mukhopadhyay (born 2 November 1935) is a Bengali author from India. He has written stories for both adults and children. He is known for creating the relatively new fictional sleuths Barodacharan and Shabor Dasgupta.

== Life ==
Shirshendu Mukhopadhyay was born in Mymensingh (now in Bangladesh) on 2 November 1935. The Mukhopadhyays were originally from Bainkhara, Bikrampur (now Munshiganj). During partition his family migrated to Kolkata. He spent his childhood in Bihar and many places in Bengal and Assam accompanying his father, who worked in the railways. He passed intermediate from the Victoria College (now ABN Seal College), Koch Behar before taking a Masters in Bengali from Calcutta University. Mukhopadhyay started his career as a school teacher and is now on the staff of Anandabazar Patrika at Kolkata. He is associated with the Bengali magazine Desh.

== Film adaptions ==
Mukhopadhyay's novels were later adopted in movies.

- Hirer Angti was adapted into a movie Hirer Angti by Rituparno Ghosh in 1992.
- Nabiganjer Daityo was adapted into a movie Ajab Gayer Ajab Katha by Tapan Sinha in 1998.
- Patal Ghor was adapted into a movie Patalghar by Abhijit Choudhury in 2003.
- His short story "Dosar" was filmed by Rituparno Ghosh in B/W format into the film Dosar in 2006.
- Sadhubabar Lathi was adapted into a movie Sadhu Babar Lathi in 2008.
- In 2010, a film has been released named Banshiwala, the script of which is adopted from the novel 'Banshiwala', written by him.
- Kagojer Bou was also adapted into a 2011 film by director Bappaditya Bandopadhyay.
- Gosainbaganer Bhoot, adapted into a movie, Gosainbaganer Bhoot in 2011.
- Chayamoy, has been adapted into a movie by director Haranath Chakraborty in 2013.
- Goynar Baksho has been adapted into a movie by director Aparna Sen in 2013.
- Ashchorjyo Prodeep has been adapted into a movie by director Anik Dutta in 2013.
- Riṇ has been adapted into a movie named Ebar Shabor by director Arindam Sil in 2015.
- Eagoler Chokh has been adapted into a movie by director Arindam Sil in 2016.
- Aschhe Abar Shabor is a 2018 film and third installment of Goenda Shabor film series, is based on his story Prajapatir Mrityu O Punarjanmo.
- Manojder Adbhut Bari is a 2018 film of Anindya Chatterjee is based on the novel in the same name.
- Bony is a 2021 film based on the novel of the same name.
- Tirandaj Shabor is a 2022 film and fourth installment of Goenda Shabor film series, based on his novel Tirandaj.

== Fiction ==
"Jal Taranga" was his first story published in the magazine "Desh" in 1959. After 7/8 years of writing story Ghunpoka was his first novel published in the annual Puja edition of the magazine Desh. His first children's novel was called Manojder Adbhut Bari.

=== Novel ===
- Baithaki, Publisher: Smell of Books
- Ghunpoka (ঘুণপোকা) (1967)
- Parapar (পারাপার)
- Ujan (উজান)
- Rangin Sanko (রঙিন সাঁকো)
- Phera (ফেরা)
- Brishtir Ghran (বৃষ্টির ঘ্রাণ)
- Basstop-e Keu Nei (বাসস্টপে কেউ নেই)
- Din Jaay (দিন যায়)
- Nayanshyama (নয়নশ্যামা)
- Pherighaat (ফেরিঘাট)
- Ashchorjo Bhromon (আশ্চর্য ভ্রমণ)
- Jao Pakhi (যাও পাখি)
- Jibanpatra (জীবনপাত্র)
- Shyaola (শ্যাওলা)
- Rawkter Bish (রক্তের বিষ)
- Kagojer Bou (কাগজের বউ)
- Shunyer Udyaan (শূন্যের উদ্যান)
- Laal Neel Manush (লাল নীল মানুষ)
- Fajal Ali Aschhe (ফজল আলী আসছে)
- Khoy (ক্ষয়)
- Nilu Hazrar Hatyaarahasya (নীলু হাজরার হত্যারহস্য)
- Fulchor (ফুলচোর)
- Shiulir Gandho (শিউলির গন্ধ)
- Bhul Satya (ভুল সত্য)
- Chhyamoyi (ছায়াময়ী)
- Akranto (আক্রান্ত)
- Jaal (জাল)
- Durbeen (দূরবীন)
- Adam Eve o Andhakaar (আদম ইভ ও অন্ধকার)
- Santaru o Jalokonya (সাঁতারু ও জলকন্যা)
- Madhab o tar Pariparshwik (মাধব ও তার পারিপার্শ্বিক)
- Kancher Manush (কাঁচের মানুষ)
- Bikeler Mrityu (বিকেলের মৃত্যু)
- Manobjomin (মানবজমিন)
- Golaper Kaanta (গোলাপের কাঁটা)
- Nana Ronger Aalo (নানা রঙের আলো)
- Chokh (চোখ)
- Drishyabali (দৃশ্যাবলী)
- Tanaporon (টানাপোড়েন)
- Haariye Jawa (হারিয়ে যাওয়া)
- Churi (চুরি)
- Keet (কীট)
- Waarish (ওয়ারিশ)
- Geet (গতি)
- Poymonto (পয়মন্ত)
- Baaghu Maannar Boraat (বাঘু মান্নার বরাত)
- Deshantari (দেশান্তরী)
- Hridaybrittanto (হৃদয়বৃত্তান্ত)
- Tithi (তিথি)
- Kapurush (কাপুরুষ)
- Chena-Awchena (চেনা-অচেনা)
- Jor-Bejor(জোড়-বিজোড়)
- Paarthib (পার্থিব)
- Harano Mani (হারানো মণি)
- Padokkhep (পদক্ষেপ)
- Morich (মারীচ)
- Goynar Baksha (গয়নার বাক্স)
- Pipul (পিপুল)
- Ghar Jamai (ঘরজামাই)
- Haatbaar (হাটবার)
- Dwitiya Shattar Shondhane (দ্বিতীয় সত্ত্বার সন্ধানে)
- Shampatti (সম্পত্তি)
- Rin (ঋণ)
- Ashukher Pore (অসুখের পরে)
- Neecher Lok Uporer Lok (নীচের লোক উপরের লোক)
- Aaloy Chhayay (আলোয় ছায়ায়)
- Sheeri Bhenge Bhenge (সিঁড়ি ভেঙে ভেঙে)
- Akadashir Bhoot (একাদশীর ভূত)
- Aalor Galpo Chhayar Galpo (আলোর গল্প ছায়ার গল্প)
- Prajapatir Mrityu O Punarjanma (প্রজাপতির মৃত্যু ও পুনর্জন্ম)
- Pidimer Aalo (পিদিমের আলো)
- Jonmantor (জন্মান্তর)
- Guhamaanob (গুহামানব)
- Kaalo Beral Shada Beral (কালো বেড়াল সাদা বেড়াল)
- Dwicharini (দ্বিচারিণী)
- Jhaanpi (ঝাঁপি)
- Tirandaj (তীরন্দাজ)
- Noronari Katha (নরনারী কথা)
- Chakra (চক্র)
- Porihatir Horin (পরিহাটির হরিণ)
- Baanshiwala (বাঁশিওয়ালা)
- Dhonnobad Mastarmoshai (ধন্যবাদ মাস্টারমশাই)

=== Children's (Adbhutuṛé Series) ===
Source: (অদ্ভুতুড়ে সিরিজ)

- Manojader Adbhut Baari: His first work, about a teenage boy named Manoj and his weird family. The story revolves around a photo of Prince, Manoj's family, teachers and neighbours. First published in July 1978.
- Pagla Saheber Kabor
- Patashgarer Jangale
- Boxer Ratan
- Gourer Kabach
- Patalghar
- Haripurer Harek Kaando
- Nabiganjer Daitya
- Hirer Aangti (transl. Diamond Ring)
- Gajananer Kouto
- Nababganjer Agantuk (transl. The Stranger of Nababganj)
- Kunjapukurer Kando
- Nrisingha Rahasya
- Raghab Babur Bari
- Hetamgarher Guptodhon
- Bhuture Ghori
- Jhiler Dhare Bari
- Sholo Nombor Fatik Ghosh
- Dakater Bhaipo (transl. The robber's nephew)
- Mohan Rayer Banshi
- Dudh Sayorer Deep
- Golmal
- Sonar Medel (transl. Gold medal)
- Chhayamoy
- Chakropurer Chakkore
- Ghorpyanche Prangobindo
- Bipin Babur Bipod
- Jhikorgachhay Jhonjhat
- Harano Kakatua
- Sadhu Babar Lathi (transl. The Saint's stick)
- Aghorgunjer Ghoralo Byapar
- BotukBuror Choshma
- Golmele Lok
- Unhu
- Ashtopurer Britanta
- Advuture
- Goshai Baganer Bhoot
- Moynagorer Brittanto
- Madan Tapadarer Bakso
- Sarboneshe Bhul Anko
- Bholu Jokhon Raja Holo
- Habu Bhui Malir Putul
- Nondi Barir Shakh
- Jong Bahadur Singhor Nati
- Asmanir Chor
- Gor Hekimpurer Rajbari
- Hirongorer Byaparsyapar
- Asubabur Telescope
- Ek Aschorjo Feriwala

== Awards ==
- Vidyasagar Award (1985) – for his contributions to children's literature
- Ananda Purashkar (1973 and 1990)
- Sahitya Akademi award (1989) for his novel Manabjamin
- Banga Bibhushan award (2012)
- Sahitya Akademi Fellowship (2021)
- ABP Ananda Sera Bangali Award (Sera'r sera)
- Kuvempu Rashtriya Puraskar, 2023
