= Balukabela.com =

2012 Indian Bengali film

- Directed by: Partha Sen
- Screenplay by: Padmanava Dasgupta, Rudranil Ghosh
- Story by: Pracheta Gupta
- Produced by: Kunal Ghosh
- Cinematography: Premendu Bikash Chaki
- Music by: Raja Narayan Deb
- Production company: Saradha Group
- Distributed by: Shree Venkatesh Films
- Release date: 14 December 2012
- Country: India
- Language: Bengali

Balukabela.com is a Bengali language film directed by Partha Sen. The film was world-premiered in London in May 2012.

== Cast ==
- Parambrata Chattopadhyay
- Locket Chatterjee
- Payel Roy
- Ambalika
- Taniya
- Indranil
- Abhiraj
- Rudranil Ghosh
- Rahul
- Bratya Basu
- Saswata Chatterjee

Plot Summary

A runaway couple decide to celebrate their wedding anniversary at the beachside Balukabela hotel. A game of hide and seek commences, when their boss visits the same hotel to find solace.

== See also ==
- Aborto
- Goynar Baksho
