= Chobiyal =

2020 Indian Bengali film

- Original title: bn
- Directed by: Manas Basu
- Produced by: Milan Dutta
- Starring: Saswata Chatterjee; Srabanti Chatterjee; Samiul Alam; Joyjit Banerjee
- Music by: Megh Banerjee
- Production company: Paramhansa Chitram
- Release date: 11 December 2020
- Country: India
- Language: Bengali

Chobiyal is a 2020 Bengali thriller drama film directed by Manas Basu and produced by Milan Dutta. This film is under the banner of Paramhansha Chitram. The film was released on 11 December 2020.

== Plot ==
Habol is a photographer and has a studio near a crematorium. He is passionate about taking pictures of dead bodies. He works with a senior photographer Kanak in various wedding photoshoots. One day when Kanak leaves town, Labonya, a mysterious housewife, comes to Habol. He falls in love with Labonya and they start staying together. When Habol's friends ask about their relationship, he disappears with the mysterious lady from the area.

== Cast ==
- Saswata Chatterjee as Habol
- Srabanti Chatterjee as Labonya
- Amitabh Bhattacharjee as Kanak
- Samiul alam
- Joyjit Banerjee
- Mallika Bandopadhyay
