= Manojder Adbhut Bari =

2018 film by Anindya Chatterjee

- Film poster
- Directed by: Anindya Chatterjee
- Based on: Manojder Adbhut Bari by Shirshendu Mukhopadhyay
- Produced by: Anindya Chatterjee
- Starring: See below
- Edited by: Arghyakamal Mitra
- Music by: Raja Narayan Deb
- Production company: Windows Production
- Release date: 12 October 2018 (Kolkata)
- Country: India
- Language: Bengali

Manojder Adbhut Bari is a 2018 Indian Bengali-language comedy drama film directed by Anindya Chatterjee based on the novel of the same name by Shirshendu Mukhopadhyay. Soumitra Chatterjee, Sandhya Roy and Abir Chatterjee play the lead roles. The film was released on 12 October 2018 under the banner of Windows Production House.

== Plot ==
Manoj is a young boy who lives in a small town in Bengal with his two siblings and a weird family which has his parents, grandmother, two uncles and a grand-aunt. Each member in his family is a special character with some quirk or the other. Two other members are also there at his place; one teacher who forgets all his education if he has to sit straight while studying and a music teacher, who gets suicidal every morning after singing a wrong tune. The story opens on a typical day at Manoj’s household where all his family members are creating chaos as usual. While a cow from their cow shed has run away, Manoj’s grand-aunt is wreaking havoc on the house. The day goes through various twists and turns with visits by a detective, who is so staunch in his professionalism that he never enters a house through the main door and a police officer, who is a peace-loving man. While this is going on at the house, there is a dangerous robbery being planned by a group of vicious dacoits led by a young man. They plan to rob the royal palace but the king is in rather bad shape as he is a miser with no income to speak of. While Manoj’s uncle gets involved in the robbery, Manoj gets involved in saving the royal palace. Drama, action and loads of laughter later, the king and queen find their lost son and Manoj gets back his family of lovely weirdos.

== Cast ==
The cast of the film:

- Bratya Basu as Goenda Baradacharan
- Soumitra Chatterjee as Raja Gobindonarayan
- Sandhya Roy as Rani Maa
- Abir Chatterjee as Kandarpanarayan / Kodu
- Rajatava Dutta as Bhajahari
- Silajit Majumder as Dacoit leader
- Sohag Sen as Pishima
- Aparajita Auddy as Baiji
- Manoj Mitra as Golok Master
- Ambarish Bhattacharya as Music Teacher
- Subhrajit Dutta as Gobindo's nephew
- Sumit Samaddar as Nishi Daroga
- Soham Maitra as Manoj
- Purab Sheel Acharya as Saroj

== Soundtrack ==
Manojder Adbhut Bari

Film score by Silajit Majumder, Shaan & Background Music by Raja Narayan Deb
- Language: Bengali
- Label: SVF Music
- Producer: Anindya Chatterjee

No.	Title	Music	Singer(s)	Length
1.	"O Go Luchi"	Ananya	Shaan	4:22
2.	"Dakater Gaan"	Shilajit Majumder	Shilajit Majumder	3:56
