= Subhrajit Dutta =

Indian Bengali actor

- Born: Kolkata, West Bengal, India
- Occupation: Actor

Subhrajit Dutta is an Indian film and theatre actor who appears in Bengali films and television serials. Some of the notable Bengali films he acted in include Ebar Shabor, Manojder Adbhut Bari, Eagoler Chokh and Double Feluda.

== Career ==
=== Theatre career ===
Dutta started his acting career as an actor in Bengali theatre. He first acted in a Bengali drama when he was in class VI. Later, Dutta and some of his friends started a theatre group named "Arkaj". His first major role as a theatre actor was in the drama Angshumati, directed by Ramaprasad Banik for the theatre group Purba Paschim. Later he acted in several other dramas such as Haripada Haribol of Chetana, Raktakarabi, directed by Goutam Halder, Nashtanir etc.

=== Film and television career ===
Dutta acted in several Bengali television serials such as Ekdin Pratidin (2005–2007), Ekhane Akash Neel (2008–2009), Bokul Kotha. In Bokul Kotha, he played the character of Rohan. He also acted in a 200-episode long television serial Bhumi Konnya, directed by Arindam Sil. He played the role of Deshbandhu Chittaranjan Das in Netaji which aired on GEC Zee Bangla.

He also acted in the webseries Gogoler Kirti, where he played the role of Gogol's father.

He played the negative role of Prasoon Bose in the serial Gaatchora (20 December 2021 to 2 June 2024), which aired on Star Jalsha and has since concluded.

== Filmography ==
- Ekti Khunir Sandhane Mitin (2025)
- Jongole Mitin Mashi (2023)
- Tirandaj Shabor (2022)
- Professor Shonku O El Dorado (2019)
- Mitin Mashi (2019)
- Manojder Adbhut Bari (2018)
- Reunion (2018)
- Asche Abar Shabor (2018)
- Double Feluda (2016)
- Chitrakar (2016)
- Eagoler Chokh (2016)
- Ebar Shabor (2015)
- Buno Haansh (2014)
- Chaar (2014)
- Shaada Kalo Aabcha (2013)
- Jekhane Bhooter Bhoy (2012)
- Ami Mantri Habo (2011)
- Magno Mainak (2009)
- Hitlist (2009)

== Television ==
- Binni Dhaner Khoi
- Mohor
- Aamar Durga
- Bokul Kotha
- Netaji
- Phirki
- Karunamoyee Rani Rashmoni
