= Tiyasha =

- Directed by: Animesh Roy
- Written by: Pinak Pani Deb
- Produced by: Ashoka Tree Entertainment Pvt Ltd, Pune
- Starring: Saswata Chatterjee; Chandrayee Ghosh, RJ Shekhar; Soham BasuRoychowdhury; Jayanti Bhowmick
- Cinematography: Magi Natesh
- Edited by: Anindo Chatterjee, Nilanjan Mondal
- Music by: Aninda Bose and Debanjalee Banerjee
- Distributed by: Goodwin Films
- Release date: 20 September 2013 (Kolkata)
- Running time: 137 minutes
- Country: India
- Language: Bengali

Tiyasha is a 2013 Bengali film directed by Animesh Roy, starring Saswata Chatterjee and Chandrayee Ghosh. The film explores modern-day relationships.

== Plot ==
The film tells a story of romance and love. It follows the journey of a man, Sudipto (Saswata Chatterjee), as he defies the odds to maintain a healthy and happy family. The story revolves around Sudipto, his wife Riya (Chandrayee Ghosh), and their son Tojo (Soham BasuRoychowdhury).

== Cast ==
- Saswata Chatterjee as Sudipto
- Chandrayee Ghosh as Riya
- RJ Shekhar as Shekhar
- Soham BasuRoychowdhury as Tojo
- Jayanti Bhowmick as a friend

== Production ==
=== Casting ===
In this film, Saswata Chatterjee portrayed an unsuccessful man's character. Chandrayee Ghosh played the character of a radio jockey. Ghosh's last movie before Tiyasha was Necklace, directed by Sekhar Das, which was released in 2011. Ghosh told in an interview—

When it comes to films, I’m very choosy. I don’t say yes unless the role appeals to me. I like being a part of relationship tales and that’s why I said yes to Tiasha", said Chandreyee, who is also looking forward to working with Saswata after a long time. "Saswata and I go back a long way. We’ve done many telefilms and serials together and this would be the first time we will be seen together on the big screen.

=== Filming ===
The shooting of the film began on 24 May 2013.

== Soundtrack ==
The soundtrack of the movie involves collaborations from music directors Aninda Bose and Debanjalee Banerjee, Avik Chaudhuri and Sunidhi Chauhan, Anwesha Datta Gupta, Chandrayee Ghosh, Rupankar Bagchi and Argha Dutta.

| No. | Title | Lyrics | Music | Singer(s) | Length |
|---|---|---|---|---|---|
| 1. | "Jiboneri.....Tiyasha" | Debanjalee Banerjee | Debanjalee Banerjee | Rupankar Bagchi |
| 2. | "Aami Roopey Tomay" | Rabindranath Tagore | | Chandrayee Ghosh |
| 3. | "Kakhono Je Andhar Theke" | Aninda Bose | Aninda Bose | Sunidhi Chauhan |
| 4. | "Bheja Bheja Bhor" | Avik Chaudhuri | Avik Chaudhuri | Anwesha Datta Gupta |
| 5. | "Suni Re Sajariya" | | Kaya | Argha Dutta |

== Release and reception ==
The film was released on 20 September 2013 in West Bengal, India.
