= Korpur =

2026 Bengali film

- Bengali: কর্পূর
- Literally: Camphor
- Directed by: Arindam Sil
- Based on: Antardhaner Nepothye by Dipanwita Roy
- Written by: Subhasish Guha (screenplay & dialogues)
- Story by: Dipanwita Roy
- Produced by: Firdausul Hasan; Prabal Halder; Adipta Majumder
- Starring: Rituparna Sengupta; Bratya Basu; Saheb Chatterjee; Kunal Ghosh; Arpan Ghoshal; Lahoma Bhattacharya; Ananya Banerjee
- Cinematography: Anirban Chatterjee
- Edited by: Sanglap Bhowmik
- Music by: Rathijit Bhattacharjee
- Production companies: Friends Communication; Kahhak Studios
- Distributed by: PVR Inox Pictures
- Release date: 19 March 2026
- Running time: 150 minutes
- Country: India
- Language: Bengali

Korpur (Bengali pronunciation: [kɔrpuɾ]; Bengali: কর্পূর, lit. 'Camphor') is a 2026 Indian Bengali-language political thriller film directed by Arindam Sil. Produced by Firdausul Hasan, Prabal Halder and Adipta Majumder under the banners of Friends Communication and Kahhak Studios respectively, the film is based on Dipanwita Roy's novel Antardhaner Nepothye, which focuses on the unsolved case of disappearance of Manisha Mukhopadhyay, the then the assistant controller of examinations at Calcutta University.

The movie released on 19 March 2026 under the banner of Friends Communication. This is the debut film of Bengali political personality Kunal Ghosh.

== Plot ==
Back in 1997, Moushumi Sen, a University Exam Controller, vanished without a trace during a massive 50-crore scandal. The media insisted she escaped to London, but a gagged police officer sensed a much deeper, sinister political plot. Fast forward twenty two years, investigative journalist Anupam reignites the dormant case, bringing to light a deep-seated web of systemic corruption.

== Cast ==
- Rituparna Sengupta as Mousumi Sen, Exam Controller in 1997
- Saheb Chatterjee as Niloy Biswas
- Bratya Basu as Rakhohori Goswami, OC in 1997
- Lahoma Bhattacharjee as Susmita Sen, Mousumi's daughter/ Riya Tamang (fake identity)
- Kunal Ghosh as Shankar Mallik, member of ruling party in 1997
- Arindam Sil as Sukhen Sen, Mousumi's estranged husband
- Arpan Ghoshal as Anupam Roy
- Ananya Banerjee as Gairika
- Rumki Chatterjee as Mousumi's mother
- Kanad Maitra
- Sanjib Sarkar as Mohit Basu
- Pradipta Roy
- Avishek De Biswas

== Reception ==
Shampali Mullick of Sangbad Pratidin reviewed the film, noting that it effectively draws the viewer in from the opening scene. The review highlights how the political thriller balances its tense narrative with human emotions. While the film is inspired by Dipanwita Roy's novel Antardhaner Nepothye and the real-life disappearance of a university official in 1997, Mullick observes that the screenplay makes necessary changes for cinematic adaptation. The film's exploration of an alleged education scam is noted as a compelling element in the journey to uncover the mystery.

Reviewing for Aaro Ananda, critic noted that while the film focuses on the Left Front era’s education corruption without engaging in political debate, its propaganda elements are evident through repeated imagery. However, the review praised Rituparna Sengupta’s “effortless and flawless” performance as the film’s soul, alongside strong supporting turns from Bratya Basu, Saheb Chatterjee, Arpan Ghoshal, and Kunal Ghosh. The first half was described as taut and engaging, with the mystery deepening in the second. Criticisms included an overlong climax that “loses its thread,” odd-looking wig work in flashbacks, and shortcomings in editing. The film received a rating of 2.5 out of 5.
