= Durga Sohay =

- Film poster
- দুর্গা সহায়
- Directed by: Arindam Sil
- Produced by: Avishek Ghosh
- Starring: Sohini Sarkar; Koushik Sen
- Cinematography: Gairik Sarkar
- Edited by: Sujay Datta Ray
- Music by: Bickram Ghosh
- Production company: AVMA MEDIA LLP
- Release date: 28 April 2017
- Running time: 101 min.
- Language: Bengali

Durga Sohay is a Bengali family drama cum thriller film directed by Arindam Sil and produced by Avishek Ghosh. This film was released on 28 April 2017. The music was released by Amara Muzik.

== Plot ==
The story revolves around the incidents of an Aristrocratic Banedi jewellers family in north kolkata during the period between Mahalaya and Vijayadashami. Durga, a young lady enters into the house of the wealthy Basak family as a nurse to take care of the oldest person. She however turns out to be a thief, caught by the younger daughter-in-law of the family, Manasi. Compassionate Manasi however convinces others to give her a second chance. Gradually Durga takes all the member in confidence and becomes as good as a family member. Actually she joins the house as a servant according to the plan of her husband Madhab who is a dacoit. Madhab and his goons plan to raid the house in the night of Dashami, but fail when Durga informs the police beforehand. After the decoit team is caught, police take in Durga as well. Because Durga is actually Chaina who was the informer of the said decoits and was guilty for three thefts. But Basak family, promises Durga to help her and welcomes her back when she is free. The film ends with the departure of Maa Durga and Durga/Chaina, with the hope that both of them will come back to their homes when it is time.

== Cast ==
- Sohini Sarkar as Durga/Chaina
- Kaushik Sen as Dibyendu
- Tanusree Chakraborty as Manasi
- Debjani Chattopadhyay as Smita
- Sampurna Lahiri as Panni
- Indrasish Roy as Shuvo
- Sumanta Mukherjee as Dadu, Head of family
- Rwitobroto Mukherjee as Bhrigu
- Anusha Vishwanathan as Bhrigu's friend
- Sean Banerjee as Hiranya
- Anirban Bhattacharya as Madhab/ Durga's husband in a Guest appearance
