= Brake Fail =

2009 Indian Bengali film

- Directed by: Kaushik Ganguly
- Screenplay by: Kaushik Ganguly
- Story by: Kaushik Ganguly
- Starring: Parambrata Chattopadhyay; Swastika Mukherjee; Annu Kapoor; Saswata Chatterjee; Santu Mukherjee; Arindam Sil; Lama; Taranga Biswas; Paran Bandopadhyay; Tanima Sen
- Music by: Neel Dutt
- Release date: 2009
- Country: India
- Language: Bengali

Brake Fail is a 2009 Indian Bengali film. The film was directed by Kaushik Ganguly, produced by Mumbai Mantra and the music was composed by Neel Dutt.

== Cast ==
- Parambrata Chattopadhyay
- Swastika Mukherjee
- Annu Kapoor
- Saswata Chatterjee
- Santu Mukhopadhyay
- Arindam Sil
- Lama (Arindam Haldar)
- Taranga Biswas
- Paran Bandopadhyay
- Tanima Sen

== Songs ==
- "Jodi Proshno Karo" - Shaan, Shreya Ghoshal
- "Jinga La la"
- "Shorey Shorey Jay"- Shaan, Shreya Ghoshal
- "Rang Laga De"
- "Bhenge Mor Ghorer Chabi"
- "Ghure Taakalei"

== See also ==
- Laptop, 2008 Bengali film
