= Ebar Shabor =

2015 Indian Bengali film

- Theatrical release poster
- Directed by: Arindam Sil
- Written by: Shirshendu Mukhopadhyay
- Screenplay by: Padmanabha Dasgupta; Arindam Sil
- Based on: Rwin by Shirshendu Mukhopadhyay
- Starring: Saswata Chatterjee; Swastika Mukherjee; Abir Chatterjee; Payel Sarkar; Ritwick Chakraborty; June Malia; Rahul Banerjee
- Cinematography: Sirsha Ray
- Edited by: Sujay Dutta Ray
- Music by: Bickram Ghosh
- Production companies: Reliance Entertainment; Mundus Services
- Distributed by: Reliance Entertainment
- Release date: 2 January 2015
- Running time: 2 hours 6 minutes
- Country: India
- Language: Bengali
- Box office: ₹1.12 crore

Ebar Shabor (Bengali: এবার শবর; lit. Now It's the hunter) is a 2015 Indian Bengali-language mystery-thriller film based on the detective story "Rwin" (ঋণ) by Shirshendu Mukhopadhyay. The film is directed by Arindam Sil, and produced by Reliance Entertainment and Mundus Services. This is the first installment of Goenda Shabor film series. This is Sil's second directorial venture after the blockbuster Aborto The film is based on the investigation of the murder of Mitali Ghosh (Swastika Mukherjee). What follows is a revelation of certain shameful truths that are prevalent in the life of a typical high society person. The film was released on 2 January 2015.

== Plot ==
A police detective Shabor Dasgupta is entrusted with the daunting task of solving the mystery surrounding the murder of Mitali Ghosh, a woman with a messy past, who was killed on the night she had thrown a party for friends and family. The task is daunting for Shabor because of the number of people involved. Mitali was once married to Mithu Mitra, whom she divorced before settling overseas. Though she soon realized how much she loved him, her ego kept her from coming back to him. Heartbroken, Mithu found love in Mitali's cousin Joyeeta. Also involved was Mitali's childhood friend and secret admirer Samiran, who has relationships with several women, including a school's physical education teacher, Julekha Sharma, and another girl, Khonika. Shabor starts investigation with his assistant Nandalal. As Shabor probes deeper, he learns many disturbing secrets about the Ghosh family, including the fact that Mitali had once eloped with a boy from her locality Pantu Haldar. She had married and left him within six months, ruining his future in the process. He was arrested and beaten black and blue by the police who were paid by Mitali's father for the same. Such savage beating resulted in severe nerve damage and erectile dysfunction in Pantu. His career, too, was ruined. Another character, Doyel, also comes into the picture. The detective now has to deal with the complex relationship problems that run deep root in the family and the mystery gets more and more complicated. After her father's death, Mitali comes back to Kolkata and stays with Joyeeta's family. Later, Joyeeta reveals that she's dating Mithu. Mitali is heartbroken, and tries to lure Mithu by joining their accounts in vain. In the party, Samiran flirts with Mitali and calls her attractive before a much disgusted Khonika. Mitali had confided into Khonika about Mithu and Joyeeta's affair. Meanwhile, when Mitali was in Pondicherry, her father got into a sexual relationship with Doyel and a son was born to them. Doyel was a poor nurse and she started to blackmail him into marrying her but in vain. She even told Mitali about their relation to get a share into his property after his death but was kicked out as a fraud. In that evening before the party, she sneaked in the house with the help of family servant Haren da to steal some money. Unable to provide for her son, Julekha was forced into prostitution, targeting men to earn from. On one such hunts, she came across Pantu; who paid her but could not please her owing to his erectile dysfunction. She insulted him very roughly for that. All the events of the past and Mitali's role in ruining his life flogged Pantu's mind, and a frustrated Pantu thus went and stabbed Mitali six times, saying three were from him and three from Mithu.

== Cast ==
- Saswata Chatterjee as ACP Shabor Dasgupta, Lalbazar, Kolkata Police
- Subhrajit Dutta as Nandalal
- Swastika Mukherjee as Mitali Ghosh
- Abir Chatterjee as Mithu Mitra
- Payel Sarkar as Joyeeta Ghosh
- Ritwick Chakraborty as Pantu Haldar
- June Malia as Rita/Julekha/Doyel Ghosh
- Debolina Dutta as Khonika
- Rahul Banerjee as Samiran Bagchi
- Santu Mukherjee as Madhu Bagchi
- Nitya Ganguly as Haren
- Dipankar De as Barun Ghosh
- Rajat Ganguly as Arun Ghosh

== Reception ==
Upon the release Ebar Shabor received positive response from Critics. The movie has been running to packed houses over the weekend. All multiplex shows were sold out. Weekday shows have had 70-75% attendance across multiplexes.

== Sequel ==
After the film's grand success, Sil is planning a sequel to this film. There will be new producers as Mundus Services have gone bankrupt after the film's release and Reliance Entertainment won't launch new ventures just yet. It has been titled Eagoler Chokh.

== See also ==
- Aborto, a 2013 Indian Bengali film
