= Buno Haansh =

- Theatrical release poster
- Directed by: Aniruddha Roy Chowdhury
- Screenplay by: Shyamal Sengupta
- Based on: Buno Haansh Samaresh Majumdar
- Produced by: Reliance Entertainment & Opus Communications (Indrani Mukerjee) & Eskay Movies
- Starring: Dev; Srabanti Chatterjee; Tanusree Chakraborty
- Cinematography: Harendra Singh
- Edited by: Arghyakamal Mitra
- Music by: Shantanu Moitra
- Production company: Reliance Entertainment
- Release date: 15 August 2014 (Kolkata)
- Running time: 141:53 minutes
- Country: India
- Language: Bengali

Buno Haansh (English: Wild Goose) is an Indian Bengali-language action thriller film directed by Aniruddha Roy Chowdhury. It is based on a novel by Samaresh Majumdar of the same name, and features actors Dev, Srabanti Chatterjee and Tanusree Chakraborty in the lead roles. The music in this film was composed by Shantanu Moitra. The film was released on 15 August 2014.

== Plot ==
The story of the film, which deals with the underworld, revolves around Amal (played by Dev), who engages himself deeply into a smuggling business. The events which occur after the boy realizes that he has become part of a dangerous game, form the climax of the story.

== Cast ==
- Dev as Amal
- Srabanti Chatterjee as Sohag
- Tanusree Chakraborty as Rijula
- Moon Moon Sen as Madam
- Arindam Sil as the owner of a massage parlour
- Arindol Bagchi as Amal's brother
- Sudipta Chakraborty as Amal's sister-in-law
- Gargi Roychowdhury as Adrija/Addy
- Anindya Pulak as Robin
- Shankar Chakraborty as Badal bhai
- Subhrajit Dutta as Sohag's brother
- Alokananda Roy as Sohag's mother
- Shantilal Mukherjee as Rafik
- Sohag Sen as Amal's mother
- Pijush Bandyopadhyay as Habib bhai
- Raima Sen as Bar Dancer

== Making ==
=== Production ===
Arindam Sil is the executive producer for Buno Haansh. The film is one of the high-budget films of Tollywood. The film was earlier titled Runway.

=== Casting ===
This is the first collaboration of all the members of the cast of Buno Haansh with Aniruddha Roy Chowdhury. Initially, Koel Mallick was supposed to play the female lead, but she stepped back due to date problems. After that, various names like Radhika Apte, Raima Sen and Payel Sarkar were being considered to bag the female lead. Finally, Srabanti Chatterjee was signed to play the role.

Veteran Bengali actress Moon Moon Sen reappeared on big screen with this film after nine years, her last film being Bow Barracks Forever, which was released in 2004. She was reported to play a central character in this film. In an interview, she said, "Yes, Tony (Aniruddha Roy Chowdhury) has approached me with a role in his next film. In the past too, Tony had approached me, but somehow I couldn't work out the time. But this time I'm really looking forward to it, though I'm yet to hear the script and sign on the dotted line. At present, both of us are talking about the film." Even director Chowdhury said that signing Moon Moon was like a dream come true for him and that, there was no other actress who would fit the character perfectly.

=== Filming ===
Director Aniruddha Roy Chowdhury was reported to search for shooting locations at Mumbai. Some scenes were also shot in Bangladesh and Thailand. In Bangladesh, the art direction was provided by Tarek Bablu.

== Soundtrack ==
Buno Haansh

Soundtrack album by Shantanu Moitra
- Released: 27 June 2014
- Genre: Feature film soundtrack
- Length: 26:08
- Label: T-Series
- Producer: Bhushan Kumar

Shantanu Moitra chronology
Bobby Jasoos (2014)	Buno Haansh (2014)

The soundtrack of the film is given by Shantanu Moitra, while the lyrics are written by Srijato, Anindya Chatterjee and Chandril Bhattacharya. The full album was released on iTunes on 27 June 2014. T-Series also uploaded a jukebox of the album on YouTube on that very same day. There are five original tracks in the album.

=== Track listing ===
All lyrics are written by Srijato, Anindya Chatterjee and Chandril Bhattacharya; all music is composed by Shantanu Moitra.

Buno Haansh
No.	Title	Lyrics	Singer(s)	Length
1.	"Zindagi Kahin Bhi Thamti Nahi"	Srijato	Bonnie Chakraborty	4:38
2.	"Hariye Thikana Khonje Ghor"	Srijato	Lopamudra Mitra, Raja Hasan	6:38
3.	"Esheche Raat"	Srijato	Shreya Ghoshal, Papon	4:45
4.	"Anka Banka Alo Dhaka"	Anindya Chatterjee, Chandril Bhattacharya	Torsha Sirkar	4:55
5.	"Bela Boye Jay"	Anindya Chatterjee, Chandril Bhattacharya	Shreya Ghoshal, Anindya Chatterjee	5:12
Total length:				26:08
