= Byomkesh Pawrbo =

Byomkesh Pawrbo ব্যোমকেশ পর্ব
- Theatrical release poster
- Directed by: Arindam Sil
- Screenplay by: Padmanabha Dasgupta; Arindam Sil
- Story by: Saradindu Bandopadhyay
- Produced by: Shrikant Mohta; Nispal Singh; Mahendra Soni
- Starring: Abir Chatterjee; Ritwick Chakraborty; Sohini Sarkar; Sayantika Banerjee
- Cinematography: Soumik Haldar
- Edited by: Sujoy Dutta Roy
- Production companies: Shree Venkatesh Films; Surinder Films
- Distributed by: Shree Venkatesh Films; Surinder Films
- Release date: 16 December 2016
- Running time: 2h 36min
- Country: India
- Language: Bengali
- Budget: ₹2 crore (US$240,000)

Byomkesh Pawrbo (English:Byomkesh Episode) is a 2016 Indian Bengali language thriller film directed by Arindam Sil. The film is a sequel to the 2015 film Har Har Byomkesh. Produced jointly under the banner of Shree Venkatesh Films and Surinder Films, the film reprises cinematography and music by Soumik Haldar and Bickram Ghosh respectively. Sayantika Banerjee as Gulab Bai (cameo) does a special dance number for a particular scene which was choreographed by Saroj Khan. The film stars Abir Chatterjee, Ritwick Chakraborty and Sohini Sarkar in lead roles. The movie is based on the story Amriter Mrityu by Saradindu Bandyopadhyay. The film was released on 16 December 2016 to positive critical reception.

== Plot ==
Byomkesh and Ajit have been approached by Mr. Bagchi (Arindam Sil) to investigate the whereabouts of arms which were left by the U.S. soldiers after the 2nd World War. They go to the Dooars, and get rocked by the murder of a young man, Amrito followed by the explosion of Sadananda Sur's house, killing him in the process. What follows are shocking truths of Sadananda, which is connected with the arms smuggling, ending in a suspense-filled chase with the villain.

== Soundtrack ==
Track listing
No.	Title	Singer	Length
1.	"Dil Rasiya"	Ujjaini Mukherjee	2:59
2.	"Kholo Dwar Bodhua"	Iman Chakraborty, Anita Basu Mallick	2:49

== Critical reception ==
The Times of India gave the film four stars out of five.
