= Nigel Akkara =

Indian actor

- Born: Nigel Akkara; 13 August 1978 (age 48); Kerala
- Occupations: Actor, businessman, social worker
- Years active: 2012—present
- Notable work: Muktodhara, Orissa, Yoddha: The Warrior, Rajkahini, Asamapta: Incomplete, Gotro

Nigel Akkara is an Indian actor who is noted for his character portrayal in Bengali movies. He acts in theatre as well.

== Early life ==
At the age of 21, Akkara was arrested with a charge of kidnapping and 17 other cases filed against him. During his days in the correctional home, he did post-graduation in Human Rights from Indian Institute of Human Rights, New Delhi. Later he became an actor and made his debut with the 2012 Bengali film Muktodhara.

== Acting career ==
Akkara made his acting debut in 2012 with Shiboprosad Mukherjee and Nandita Roy's Bengali movie Muktodhara. He shared the screen with Rituparna Sengupta. He played the character of a prisoner who changes himself into a positive person after getting in touch with a female dance drama coach while staying in jail. The film turned out to be a major hit at the box office and Akkara's performance as a newcomer was praised by both the viewers and the critics.

== Filmography ==
- Muktodhara (2012)
- Orissa, Malayalam feature film
- Onnyo na
- Yoddha: The Warrior (2014)
- Onnyo Apala (2015)
- Rajkahini (2015)
- Virus (2016)
- Asamapto (2017)
- Jingel Bell (2018, unreleased)
- Naqaab (2018)
- Gotro (2019)
- Tirandaj Shabor

== TV serial ==
- E Amar Gurudakshina (2017)

Date	Title	Role	Channel
8 October 2018	Durgotinashini Durga	Mahisasur	Star Jalsha
10 October 2026	Asubhanashini Trinayani	Mahisasur	Zee Bangla
