= Purba Paschim =

Bengali theatre group of Kolkata, West Bengal, India

- Purba Paschim group logo
- Formation: 2005
- Type: Theatre group
- Location: Kolkata, West Bengal, India
- Members: Soumitra Mitra, malabika Mitra, Susanta das, Tarun Pal, Souparno Mitra, Sanchari Mitra, Arupratan Ganguly, Pradip Hait
- Artistic director: Bratya Basu
- Notable members: Soumitra Mitra
- Website: http://purbapaschim.net/

Purba Paschim (Bengali: পূর্ব-পশ্চিম, purbo poshchim) is a Bengali theatre group of Kolkata, West Bengal, India. The group was founded in 2005 and has staged several plays like Babli, Ashalin etc. The famous productions of the group are "Patalbabu Filmstar" based on Satyajit Roy's story and " Antony Soudamini" Directed By Soumitra Mitra, Tagores Play Chaturanga Directed By Bratya Basu acted by Kushal Chakraborty, Chaity Ghoshal, Debdut Ghosh, Soumitra Mitra. Notable people like Biswajit Chakraborty, Gargi roychoudhry, Shaantilal Mukherjee, Chaity Ghosal, Debdut Ghosh, Kanchana Moitro, Subhrajeet Dutta, Kushal Chakraborty, Film Actor Rahul acted in this Group. In the Festivals of this Group We have seen, Amman Ali Khan, Ayaan Ali Khan, Sharmila Tagore, Soumitra Chatterjee, Mohan Aghase, Gulzar, Shabana Azmi, Amol Palekar, Nandita Das and Many Others.

== History ==
Purba Paschim was launched in the year 2005. The first play they staged was Babli directed by Bratya Basu. Soumitra Mitra is the Director of the Group. The group organizes a theatre workshop every year. Many Directors have worked in various productions of the group like Bibash Chakraborty, Arun Mukhopadhayay, Ramaprasad Banik, Debesh Chattopadhyay, Goutam Halder, etc.

== Productions ==
(in alphabetical order)

- Ashalin
- Akkel Gurum
- Antony Soudamini
- Babli (2005)
- Chaturanga
- Bhalomanush
- Hasuli Banker Upokotha (2015)
- Patalbabu Filmstar
- Raktakarabi
- Ek Mancha Ek Jibon
