= Chaar =

2014 Indian Bengali film

- Chaar movie poster
- Directed by: Sandip Ray
- Written by: Sandip Ray
- Based on: Bateswarer Abodan by Parasuram; Dui Bondhu by Satyajit Ray; Kagtarua and Dui Bondhu by Satyajit Ray Porikkha by Sharadindu Bandyopadhyay
- Produced by: Shrikant Mohta; Mahendra Soni; Nispal Singh
- Starring: Saswata Chatterjee; Abir Chatterjee; Koel Mallick, Paran Bandopadhyay; Sreelekha Mitra; Sudipta Chakraborty; Pijush Ganguly
- Edited by: Subrata Roy
- Music by: Sandip Ray
- Production companies: Shree Venkatesh Films; Surinder Films
- Release date: 13 June 2014
- Running time: 1h 21min
- Country: India
- Language: Bengali

Chaar (English: Four) is a 2014 Indian Bengali anthology film, directed by Sandip Ray and produced by Shrikant Mohta, Mahendra Soni and Nispal Singh under the banner of Shree Venkatesh Films and Surinder Films. It based on four stories by different writers- Bateswarer Abodan by Parasuram, Porikkha by Sharadindu Bandyopadhyay, Kagtarua and Dui Bondhu (The Promise) by Satyajit Ray. The film features Saswata Chatterjee, Abir Chatterjee, Koel Mallick, Paran Bandopadhyay in the lead roles, and Sreelekha Mitra, Sudipta Chakraborty, Pijush Ganguly in the supporting roles. It is available on Amazon Prime Video.

== Plot ==
=== Bateshwarer Abodan ===
A famous writer Boteswar Sikhder is writing a serialized novel, "K Thake K Jai". He had decided to make this novel a tragedy and to kill off Aloka, the heroine of his novel. He is visited by many readers who object to this decision and beg him to save Aloka. They convince him to change his mind. At last Bateswar decides to not kill Aloka. The story ends with all of the previous "visitors" coming together to meet the author to reveal their true motivation. They are the family of a woman named Aloka who began to believe that her fate while she was sick was entwined with that of the character, and so they needed him to rethink the ending of his novel.

=== Dui Bondhu ===
Mahim and Pratul were childhood friends. One day, they got separated as Mahim's father got transferred. Before separating they promise each other to meet each other after twenty-five years on that date in front of a cinema hall in Kolkata. After twenty-five years, Mahim Chatterjee is now a noted author. On that very date he comes to that cinema hall hoping Pratul would also come. Unfortunately, Pratul doesn't come but sends a letter to Mahim which says he will meet him on the next Day. On the next day, to Mahim's surprise, he discovers that his friend Pratul has become a popular actor who has come to meet Mahim for keeping his promise.

=== Kagtarua ===
Mriganka is a popular singer. One day, while returning to Kolkata from Birbhum, his car's petrol finishes. His driver goes to bring petrol. Mriganka, while waiting for the driver, watches a scarecrow. He suddenly saw the scarecrow to turn into a human. He realized it is ghost of Abhiram, his servant whom he once had fired for allegedly stealing his watch. Abhiram tells Mriganka that he was not the thief and to search that watch under their almira. Mriganka believes him and realizes his mistake.

== Cast ==
Story 1: Bateshwarer Abodan (English: The Contribution of Bateshwar)

- Saswata Chatterjee as Dr. Sanjib Chatterjee
- Paran Bandopadhyay as Bateshwar Sikdar
- Subhrajit Dutta as Priyabrata
- Sreelekha Mitra as Anita / Kadambanila "Kadu" Chatterjee

Story 2: Dui Bondhu (English: The Two Friends)

- Pijush Ganguly as Mahim Chatterjee
- Rajatava Dutta as Kishorilal/ Pratul
- Sudipta Chakraborty as Mahim's Wife

Story 3: Kagtarua (English: The Scarecrow)

- Saswata Chatterjee as Mriganka Shekhar Mukherjee
- Nemai Ghosh (actor) as Abhiram
- Shoumo Banerjee as Sukamal Tarafdar (Guest Appearance)
- Swaralipi Chatterjee as Manjula Tarafdar (Guest Appearance)

Story 4: Porikkha (English: The Test)

- Abir Chatterjee as Binayak Bose
- Koel Mallick as Monica Nandi

Plot
