= Saswata Chatterjee =

Indian actor (born 1970)

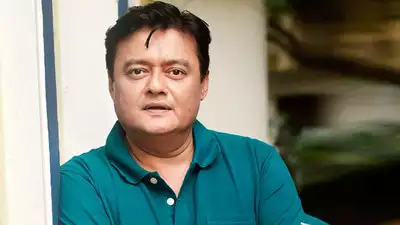
- Born: 19 December 1970 (age 55); Kolkata, West Bengal, India
- Other name: Apu
- Occupation: Actor
- Years active: 1995–present
- Spouse: Mohua Chatterjee
- Children: 1
- Father: Subhendu Chatterjee

Saswata Chatterjee (born 19 December 1970) is an Indian actor known for his work in Bengali cinema and television, with appearances in Hindi films. The son of actor Subhendu Chatterjee, he began his career with a Hindi television series directed by Saibal Mitra, based on Samaresh Majumdar's Kaalpurush. He gained recognition for portraying in detective series such as Byomkesh Bakshi and in a Feluda-based television series directed by Sandip Ray.

Chatterjee has received critical acclaim for his performances in several Bengali films, notably for his role in Meghe Dhaka Tara (2013), where he played a character inspired by Ritwik Ghatak. He achieved widespread recognition for his role as Bob Biswas, a contract killer, in Sujoy Ghosh's Hindi thriller Kahaani (2012). He gained further success by playing as antagonists and leading supporting characters in other bollywood and a Telugu movies, such as Jagga Jasoos (2017), Dhaakad (2022) and Kalki 2898 AD (2024), for all of which he received both recognition and criticism.

== Personal life ==
Saswata Chatterjee was born on 19 December 1970 to Subhendu Chatterjee, a noted Bengali actor. He lives in Kolkata and is married to Mohua Chatterjee, a teacher. They have a daughter together, Hiya Chatterjee. She is making her film debut with Rahool Mukherjee's Mon Maaney Na alongside Ritwik Bhowmik, who is also making his Bengali film debut with this film.

== Career ==
Chatterjee started his career with a Hindi serial directed by Saibal Mitra, based on Samaresh Majumdar's Kaalpurush. and a Hindi serial Krishnakant Ka Vasiyatnama on Doordarshan based on Bankimchandra Chattopadhyay's novel Krishnakanter Will. Later, he acted in a television series directed by Sandip Ray, where he portrayed the character of Topshe, a sidekick of Feluda, the sleuth. After this television debut, his acting skills were appreciated and he gained popularity.

Chatterjee's acting in several Bengali films were critically appreciated. Some of his notable appearances include Tiyasha, C/O Sir, Proloy (2013), Jekhane Bhuter Bhoy, Meghe Dhaka Tara, Bhooter Bhabishyat, Abar Bomkesh (Chitrachor), Rang Milanti, Byomkesh Bakshi (Adim Ripu), The Bong Connection, Abar Aranye. He worked in the blockbuster Hindi film, Kahaani (2012) directed by Sujoy Ghosh starring Vidya Balan. In that film, he played the role of a cold-blooded killer named Bob Biswas. His role as Bob became so popular that Chatterjee describes it as:

Bob Biswas has most definitely exceeded the popularity of Kahaani. Poor Saswata has lost his identity. He is addressed as Bob wherever he goes.

— Saswata Chaterjee on his role on Bob Biswas.

The character went viral on Facebook and Twitter with thousands of followers. A graphic novel is in the making was also inspired from Bob's character.

Meghe Dhaka Tara was released in 2013, a film inspired by the life and works of Bengali film director Ritwik Ghatak and also depicts the socio-political environment of contemporary West Bengal during the Tebhaga and Naxalite movements. In this movie, he played the lead character as Nilkantha Bagchi.

== Filmography ==
Key
†	Denotes films that have not yet been released

Year	Film	Role	Language	Note
1996	Baksho Rahashya	Topshe	Bengali	
1997	Nayantara		Bengali	
1998	Atmaja		Bengali	
1999	Tumi Ele Tai		Bengali	
1999	Khelaghar		Bengali	
2000	Shesh Thikana		Bengali	
2002	Aamar Bhuvan	Nur	Bengali	
2003	Abar Aranye	Saswata Banerjee	Bengali	
2004	Tin Ekke Tin	Tinkori	Bengali	
2004	Aabar Asibo Phire		Bengali	
2006	Teen Yaari Katha	Anil	Bengali	
2006	Dosar	Kaushik's younger brother	Bengali	
2007	Shudhu Tomar Jonyo		Bengali	
2007	The Bong Connection	Bhai-Da	English	
2008	Chalo Let's Go	Asim	Bengali	
2009	Cross Connection	Swapnil Basu	Bengali	
2009	Madly Bangalee		Bengali	
2009	Brake Fail		Bengali	
2010	Byomkesh Bakshi (Adim Ripu)	Ajit Bandyopadhyay	Bengali	
2010	Gaaner Oparey		Bengali	
2011	Get2Gether		Bengali	
2011	Uro Chithi	Manish	Bengali	
2011	Gosainbaganer Bhoot	Bhelu Daktar	Bengali	
2011	Rang Milanti	Deepjoy Mitra/Anupam Ghatak	Bengali	
2011	The Forlorn (Short Film)	Dr. Sambit Chaterjee	Bengali	
2012	Goraay Gondogol		Bengali	
2012	Sangsar Sukher Hoi Homonir Gune	Bidesh	Bengali	
2012	Bhalobasha Off Route-e		Bengali	
2012	Nobel Chor	Hari	Bengali	
2012	Kahaani	Bob Biswas	Hindi	Debut in Hindi cinema
2012	Abar Byomkesh (Chitrachor)	Ajit Bandyopadhyay	Bengali	
2012	Bhooter Bhabishyat	Hathkata Kartik	Bengali	
2012	Balukabela.com	Advocate Subimal DattaGupta	Bengali	
2012	Jekhane Bhuter Bhoy	Pratap Sarkar	Bengali	
2013	Aborto		Bengali	
2013	Meghe Dhaka Tara	Nilkantha Bagchi	Bengali	
2013	Damadol	Papu Bhai	Bengali	
2013	Namte Namte	Rana Basu	Bengali	
2013	Aschorjo Prodip	Anilabha Gupto / Anilda	Bengali	
2013	Goynar Baksho	Chandan	Bengali	
2013	Proloy	Animesh Dutta	Bengali	
2013	C/O Sir	Jayabrata Ray	Bengali	
2013	Tiyasha	Sudipto	Bengali	
2014	Bonku Babu	Bonku Babu	Bengali	
2014	Baari Tar Bangla	Roopchand Sen	Bengali	
2014	Byomkesh Phire Elo (Beni Sanghar)	Ajit Bandyopadhyay	Bengali	
2014	Chaar	Sanjib Chatterjee & Mriganka Shekhar Mukherjee	Bengali	
2015	Ebar Shabor	Shabor Dasgupta	Bengali	
2015	Natoker Moto - Like a Play	Prasad	Bengali	
2015	89	The Serial Killer	Bengali	
2015	Icchemotir Golpo	Nil	Bengali	
2015	Katmundu	Aiyoswami	Bengali	
2015	Rajkahini	Mr. Prafulla Sen	Bengali	
2015	Byomkesh Bakshi	Ajit Bandyopadhyay	Bengali	
2015	Monchuri	Kartik	Bengali	
2016	Praktan	Special Appearance	Bengali	
2016	Hemanta	Kalyan Sen	Bengali	
2016	Eagoler Chokh	Shabor Dasgupta	Bengali	
2016	Byomkesh O Chiriyakhana	Ajit Bandyopadhyay	Bengali	
2016	Monchora	Manmatho / Raima's Brother	Bengali	
2016	Cholai	Various	Bengali	
2016	Bastav	Kamal Rakshit	Bengali	
2016	Double Feluda	Surajit Dasgupta, Dharanidhar Samaddar	Bengali	
2017	Black Coffee	Tirthoraj Roy	Bengali	
2017	Mickey & Mimi	Mimi's Father	Bengali	Short film on Addatimes
2017	Byomkesh O Agnibaan	Ajit Bandopadhyay	Bengali	
2017	Jagga Jasoos	"Tutti Futti" aka "Badol Bagchi" / Jagga's Father	Hindi	
2018	Ray		Bengali	
2018	Dwikhondito	Koushik Roy	Bengali	
2018	Aschhe Abar Shabor	Shabor Dasgupta	Bengali	
2018	Hoichoi Unlimited	Animesh Chakladar	Bengali	
2018	Good night city	DCP Chatterjee	Bengali	
2019	Thai Curry	-	Bengali	
2019	Network	Abhijit Ganguly	Bengali	
2019	Panther: Hindustan Meri Jaan	Spyder	Bengali	
2019	Basu Poribar	-	Bengali	
2019	Tokhon Kuasa Chilo		Bengali	
2019	Tarikh		Bengali	
2019	The Parcel	Souvik	Bengali	
2020	Tiki-Taka	PK	Bengali	ZEE5 Release
2020	Sannyasi Deshonayok	-	Bengali	Based on Gumnami Baba myth
2020	Dil Bechara	Mr. Basu	Hindi	Disney+ Hotstar Release
2020	Chobiyal		Bengali	
2020	Shironam		Bengali	
2021	Pratidwandi		Bengali	
2021	Hiralal		Bengali	
2021	Habu Chandra Raja Gobu Chandra Montri	Habuchandra Raja	Bengali	
2021	Shororipu 2: Jotugriho		Bengali	
2021	Anusandhan	Indra	Bengali	
2022	Swastik Sanket	Subhas Chandra Bose	Bengali	
2022	8/12 Binay Badal Dinesh		Bengali	
2022	Dobaaraa	Raja Ghosh	Hindi	
2022	Dhaakad	Handler	Hindi	
2022	Tirandaj Shabor	Shabor Dasgupta	Bengali	
2022	Achena Uttam	Uttam Kumar	Bengali	
2022	Mahisasurmarddini	Politician	Bengali	
2023	Rohossomoy		Bengali	
2023	Bad Boy	Shubhankar Bannerjee	Hindi	
2023	Eta Amader Golpo	Praveen Sharma	Bengali	
2024	Crew	Vijay Walia	Hindi	
2024	Kalki 2898 AD	Commander Manas	Telugu	Debut in Telugu cinema; partially reshot in Hindi
2024	Shastri	Madhab	Bengali	
2024	Jamalaye Jibonto Bhanu	Bhanu Bandopadhyay	Bengali	
2025	The Eken: Benaras e Bibhishika	Belal Malik	Bengali	
2025	Metro...In Dino	Sanjeev	Hindi	
2025	Dear Maa	Asitabha	Bengali	
2025	The Bengal Files	Sardar Husseini, MLA	Hindi	
2025	Akhanda 2: Thaandavam	Chang	Telugu	
2026	Hok Kolorob	SP Khudiram Chaki	Bengali	

== Web series ==
Year	Title	Role	Language	Platform
2017	Dhimaner Dinkaal	Dhiman Dutta	Bengali	ALT Balaji
2018	Shei Je Holud Pakhi	Somnath Maitra	Bengali	Hoichoi
2021	Shei Je Holud Pakhi Season 2	Somnath Maitra	Bengali	Hoichoi
2022	Mahabharat Murders	Pabitra Chatterjee	Bengali	Hoichoi
2023
2023	Kaantay Kaantay	Prashanna Kumar Basu	Bengali	ZEE5
2023	Abar Proloy	Animesh Dutta	Bengali	ZEE5
2023	The Night Manager	Brij Paul alias BJ	Hindi	Disney+ Hotstar
2023	Tooth Pari: When Love Bites	David	Hindi	Netflix
2024	Kaantaye Kaantaye	P. K. Basu	Bengali	ZEE5
2024	Advocate Achinta Aich	Advocate Sitaram Ganguly	Bengali	Hoichoi
2025	Khakee: The Bengal Chapter	Shankar “Bagha” Barua	Bengali	Netflix
2025	Gulmohor	Dhruba Esh	Bengali (Bangladesh)	Chorki
2025	Advocate Achinta Aich 2	Advocate Sitaram Ganguly (Guest appearance)	Bengali	Hoichoi
2026	Abar Proloy 2	Animesh Dutta	Bengali	ZEE5

== Television ==
Year	Show	Role	Language
1996	Gosaipur Sargaram	Topshe	Bengali
1996	Sheyal Debota Rahasya	Topshe	Bengali
1996	Bosepukure Khunkharapi	Topshe	Bengali
1996	Joto Kando Kathmandute	Topshe	Bengali
1999	Jahangirer Swarnamudra	Topshe	Bengali
1999	Ghurghutiyar Ghotona	Topshe	Bengali
1999	Golapi Mukto Rahashya	Topshe	Bengali
1999	Ambar Sen Antardhan Rahashya	Topshe	Bengali
2000	Ek Akasher Niche	Akash	Bengali
2000	Dr. Munshir Diary	Topshe	Bengali
2005	Karkat Rashi	Professor	Bengali

== Awards ==
- 2021 : West Bengal Film Journalists' Association Award for Best Actor for Chobiyal
- 2019 : Best Actor in a Foreign Language Film at Madrid International Film Festival for Shironam.
- 2014 : Zee Bangla Gaurav Samman - Best Comedian for Bhooter Bhabishyat
- 2012 : Anandalok Award - Best Supporting Actor for Bhooter Bhabishyat
- 2011 : Tele Cine Awards - Best Supporting Actor for Byomkesh Bakshi
- 2011 : Imphal International Short Film Festival 2012 - Best Supporting Actor for THE FORLORN'
