= Happy Anniversary (unreleased Hindi film) =

Film directed by Prahlad Kakkar

- Directed by: Prahlad Kakkar
- Written by: Mast Ali; Prahlad Kakkar
- Produced by: Gaurang Doshi; Viki Rajani; Sunil Lulla
- Starring: Mithun Chakraborty; Sunny Deol; Jackie Shroff; Ajay Devgn; Abhishek Bachchan; Bobby Deol; Sunil Shetty; Sanjay Kapoor; Arbaaz Khan; Manisha Koirala; Sushmita Sen; Aishwarya Rai Bachchan; Rani Mukerji; Tabu Hashmi; Zayed Khan; Kareena Kapoor Khan; Shahid Kapoor
- Cinematography: Sudeep Chatterjee
- Edited by: Vijay Mehra
- Music by: Desi Crew
- Production companies: Next Gen Films; Doshi Productions
- Distributed by: Eros International
- Country: India
- Language: Hindi

Happy Anniversary is a Bollywood comedy film produced by Gaurang Doshi and directed by Prahlad Kakkar. The film is a romantic drama which was to be released in 2016. The film has Abhishek Bachchan in lead playing Aishwarya Rai Bachchan's husband, deals with marital issues with Mithun Chakraborty, Sunny Deol, Jackie Shroff, Ajay Devgn, Bobby Deol, Sunil Shetty, Sanjay Kapoor, Arbaaz Khan, Manisha Koirala, Sushmita Sen, Rani Mukerji, Tabu Hashmi, Zayed Khan, Kareena Kapoor Khan and Shahid Kapoor in lead roles.

== Cast ==
- Mithun Chakraborty
- Sunny Deol
- Jackie Shroff
- Ajay Devgn
- Abhishek Bachchan
- Bobby Deol
- Sunil Shetty
- Sanjay Kapoor
- Arbaaz Khan
- Manisha Koirala
- Sushmita Sen
- Aishwarya Rai Bachchan
- Rani Mukerji
- Tabu Hashmi
- Zayed Khan
- Kareena Kapoor Khan
- Shahid Kapoor
