= Bickram Ghosh =

Indian classical tabla player (born 1966)

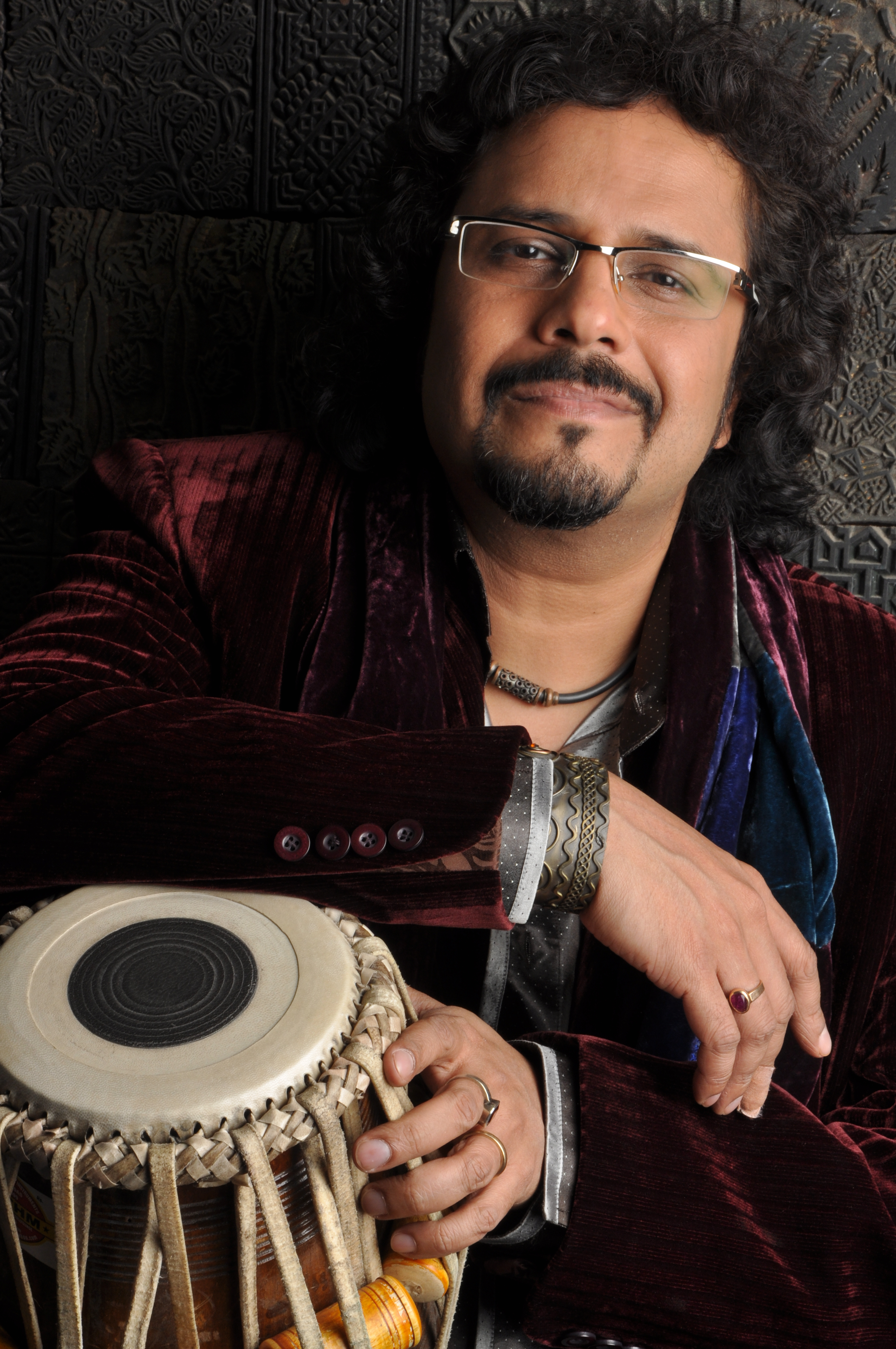
- Bickram Ghosh

Background information
- Born: 20 October 1966 (age 60); Kolkata, West Bengal
- Origin: India
- Genre: Indian classical music
- Occupations: Music composer, percussionist, actor
- Instruments: Tabla, kanjira, vocal percussion
- Labels: Folktronic, Angel, Music Today, Saregama, Music of the World
- Spouse: Jaya Seal Ghosh (m. 2004)
- Website: bickramghosh.com

Bickram Ghosh is an Indian classical tabla player.

== Early life ==
Ghosh started learning tabla from his father, Pandit Shankar Ghosh.

== Career ==
Ghosh has performed with Ali Akbar Khan and Pandit Ravi Shankar.

Ghosh's band, Rhythmscape, which performs neo-fusion music, was founded in 2001. For its tenth anniversary, Rhythmscape collaborated with Greg Ellis to perform in Kolkata and Mumbai, an event organized by Folktronic. The band also released their second album, Transformation, which went on to win the Best Fusion Album at the Indian Recording Arts Awards 2012.

Ghosh performs within Troikala with Assamese folk/indie singer Papon and Scottish singer-songwriter Rachel Sermanni. Troikala was curated and organized by British Council in association with Folktronic. He performed as part of a fusion Sufi act, "Sufusion" with vocalists Ambarish Das and Parvati Kumar, keyboardist Indrajit Dey, and drummer Arun Kumar.

Ghosh collaborated with Sonu Nigam to compose the music for the film Jal. Ghosh has scored music for the Mira Nair production, Little Zizou.

Ghosh founded his music company, Melting Pot Productions, in October 2010.

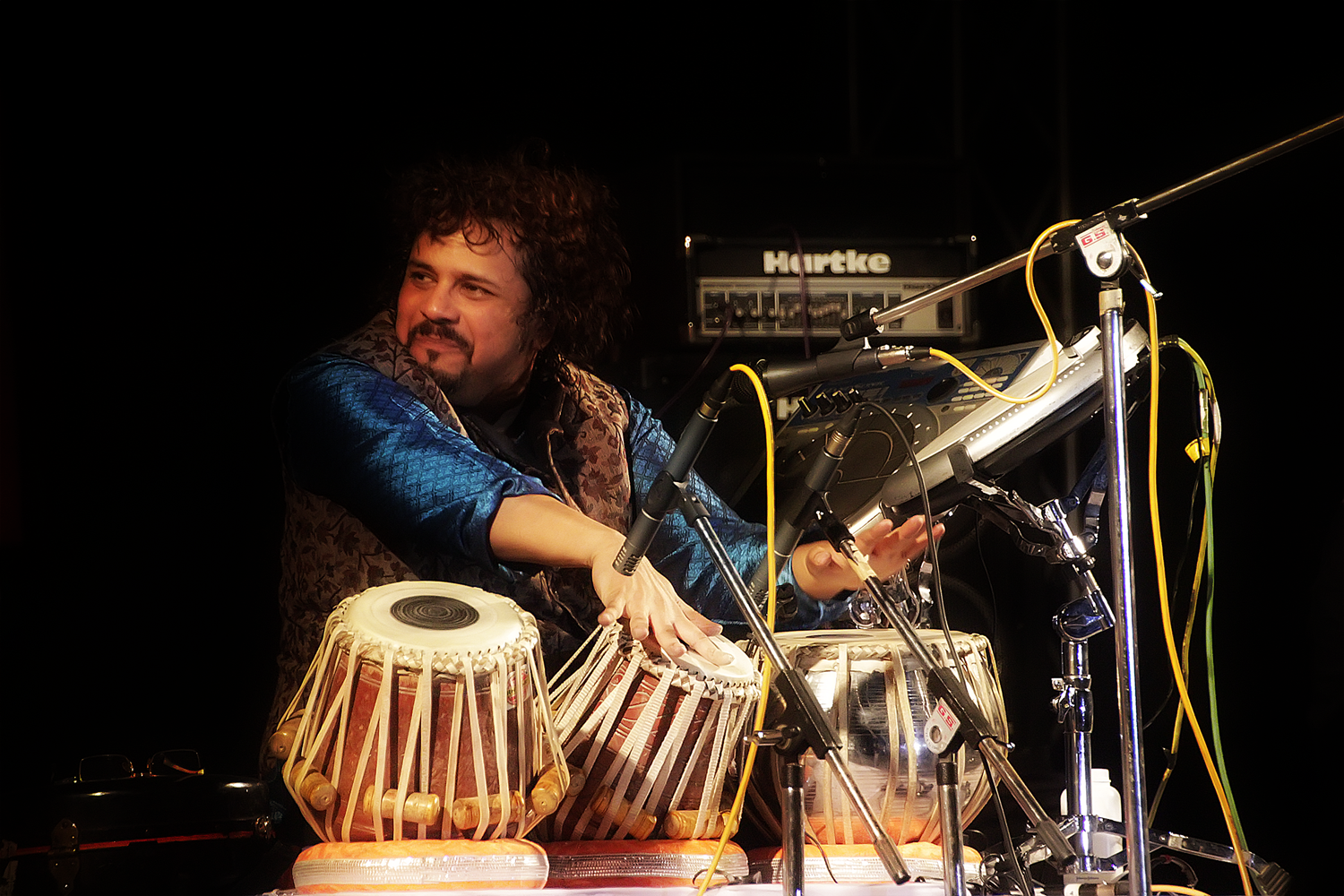
Ghosh performing fusion music during 2nd Guwahati International Music Festival.

On 1 October 2012, Ghosh won the 2012 Global Indian Music Academy (GIMA) Awards in the Best Pop/Rock Single category for his composition, Vande Mataram, featuring Indian artists including Sonu Nigam, Shankar Mahadevan and Sunidhi Chauhan.

In June 2012, Ghosh performed a concert "One World Fusion Extravaganza" at Shilpakala Vedika auditorium in Hyderabad to mark World Music Day.

He appeared in an episode of MTV Roots.

== Personal life ==
He married actress Jaya Seal in 2004, and have 2 sons.

== Discography ==
New-age experimental

Year	Album	Record label
2001	Drums of India: Father and Son	Biswas
2003	Definitive Collection- Rhythm & Zen	Sony Music
2003	Best of Swar Utsav	Music Today
2003	Rhythmscape	Navras
2007	Pulsating Drums (with Zakir Hussain, Taufiq Qureshi)	Music Today/Living Media
2007	Drum Invasion	Music Today
2007	Beyond Rhythmscape	Sagarika Music
2008	Interface (with Rahul Sharma)	Thoughtify
2008	Folktail	Thoughtify
2009	The Kingdom of Rhythm (with Pete Lockett)	Saregama
2009	Journey with the Master Percussionists of India	Drumzine
2009	Decade of Great Fusion 2000-2009	EMI Virgin
2009	Electro Classical	Sony BMG
2009	White Note	Sony BMG
2010	Tablasphere	Veecon Music & Entertainment
2011	Blazing Drums	Times Music
2011	Talking Drums: Masters of Percussion	Music Today
2011	Tagore Lounge	Veecon Music & Entertainment
2011	Transformation	Sony Music
2013	Nazrulaana	Times Music
2014	The Music Room	Times Music

Collaborations

Year	Album	Record label
1997	Chants of India- Ravi Shankar/ George Harrison	EMI Angel
1997	Nomad Christmas	Nomad/Music of the World
2000	Cello- Barry Phillips	Gourd
2000	India: Jewels of the Subcontinent	Latitudes/Music of the World
2001/2002	The Afro-Indian Project: Travels with the African	Arc Music
2002	Kora So Far- Ravi (J.P. Freeman)	Terra Nova
2002	Axiom of Choice- Unfolding	Narada
2002	Brain Washed- George Harrison	Capitol/EMI
2008	One- Bickram Ghosh and the Mezcal Jazz Unit	Saregama

Classical solo

Year	Album	Record label
1996	Talking Tabla	Music of the World
1998	Language of Rhythm: Drumming From North & South India	Music of the World
2004	Tabla Odyssey	Music Today
2006	Drumscape [DVD]	Saregama
2008	Pride of Bengal- Pandit Shankar Ghosh and Bickram Ghosh	RPG

Classical accompaniment

Year	Album	Main Artist	Record label
1995	Mukundarasam: Songs of Lord Krishna	Dr. Balamurali Krishna	Chhanda Dhara
1995	Twilight Melodies	Ajoy Chakrabarty	Chhanda Dhara
1996	Thumris	Ajoy Chakraborty	India Archives
1996	Kirvani	Tarun Bhattacharya	Music of the World
1998	Anoushka	Anoushka Shankar	EMI Angel
1999	Raga Mala (Sitar Concerto No. 2)	Ravi Shankar	EMI Classics
2000	Mental Bliss	Tarun Bhattacharya	Mind of Light
2000	Anourag	Anoushka Shankar	EMI Angel
2001	Vairagya	Ajoy Chakraborty	Navras Records
2001	Live at Carnegie Hall	Anoushka Shankar	EMI Angel
2001	Full Circle: Carnegie Hall (Grammy winning title)	Ravi Shankar	EMI Angel
2001	Hypnotic Santoor	Tarun Bhattacharya	Biswas
2002	In Portrait	Ravi Shankar	Naxos
2002	Raga Basant Mukhari	Tarun Bhattacharya	India Archives
2004	Raga Rasa: That Which Colors The Mind	Kartik Seshadri	Traditional Crossroads
2005	A Spiritual Journey	Tarun Bhattacharya	Universal Music
2005	Rise	Anoushka Shankar	Angel Records
2006	Raag Rageshri	Tarun Bhattacharya	Universal Music
2008	Musical Horizon	Tarun Bhattacharya	Horizon
2010	Crossroads	Tejendra Narayan Majumdar	Indya
2011	The Very Best of Ravi Shankar	Ravi Shankar	EMI Classics

Experimental accompaniment

Year	Album	Main Artist	Record label
1992	Songs of Nature	Vishwa Mohan Bhatt, Tarun Bhattacharya, Ronu Majumdar	Original Music Impressions
1993	Travellers Tale	Ronu Majumdar	Magnasound/ OMI
2005	Spirits	U. Rajesh, Pete Lockett	Living Media India/ Music Today
2006	Golden Krithis Vol. 3 – Beginning of the Beginning	A. Sivamani, Anoor Ananthakrishna Sharma, Bickram Ghosh, Kalaimamani M.K.S. Siva, Vishwa Mohan Bhatt	Fontana India
2008	Monsoon Melodies	U. Rajesh	Kosmik

== Filmography ==
=== Acting credit ===
Year	Title	Role	Ref.
2004	Hotath Neerar Jonnyo		
2005	Ek Mutho Chhobi	Photographer	
	Choy		

=== Music composition credit ===
Bengali film
Year	Title	Note	Ref.
2004	Hotath Neerar Jonnyo		
2004	Iti Srikanta		
2005	Devaki		
2008	Neel Rajar Deshe		
2009	Piyalir Password		
2009	Risk		
2012	Nobel Chor		
2013	Aborto		
2015	Kadambari		
2015	Ebar Shabor		
2015	Har Har Byomkesh		
2015	Swade Ahlade		
2016	Eagoler Chokh		
2016	Byomkesh Pawrbo		
2017	Durga Sohay		
2017	Dhananjay		
2018	Aschhe Abar Shabor		
2018	Guptodhoner Sondhane		
2018	Byomkesh Gotro		
2019	Basu Poribar		
2019	Durgeshgorer Guptodhon		
2019	Mitin Mashi		
2019	Sagardwipey Jawker Dhan		
2020	Asur		
2021	Golondaaj		
2021	Avijatrik		
2022	Mahananda		
2022	Tirandaj Shabor		
2022	Maayakumari		
2022	Khela Jokhon		
2022	Byomkesh		
2022	Karna Subarner Guptodhon		
2022	Iskaboner Bibi		
2023	Raghu Dakat		

Hindi film
Year	Film	Note	Ref.
2009	Little Zizou	with Giuliano Modarelli	
2010	Gumshuda		
2013	Sooper Se Ooper		
2014	Jal		
2016	Chowky	Promotional song	
2016	Happy Anniversary		
2016	Band of Maharajas		
