= Aborto =

2013 Indian Bengali film

- Directed by: Arindam Sil
- Story by: Arindam Sil
- Produced by: Globsyn Media Ventures, Cinemine Entertainment Pvt. Ltd., Maple Productions
- Starring: Joya Ahsan, Tota Roy Chowdhury, Reshmi Ghosh, Abir Chatterjee, Kaushik Ganguly, Saswata Chatterjee
- Music by: Bickram Ghosh
- Distributed by: Dag Creative Media
- Release date: 1 March 2013 (Kolkata)
- Running time: 113 minutes
- Country: India
- Language: Bengali

Aborto is a Bengali film released on 1 March 2013 and directed by Arindam Sil in his directorial debut. According to Sil, this film would be the greatest tribute to Satyajit Ray that has ever been made. The film stars Tota Roy Chowdhury, Bangladeshi actress Jaya Ahsan and Abir Chatterjee in lead roles. The screenplay was written by filmmaker Atanu Ghosh, but was not acknowledged on the posters by the director.

== Plot ==
Shyamal Sen is GM sales for an MNC and is competing for the Vice President post of his company alongside Ranadip aka Runu Sanyal. Shyamal hails from a middle-class family in Sonarpur where he has grown up with his elder brother. He is now married to Charu. Shyamal has always been jealous of his elder brother because he felt that he got all the attention in the family and was more intelligent among the siblings. He burned his brother's certificates in a fit of rage as a child. This is shown in the film's opening credits.

When Charu conceives, Shyamal persuades her for an abortion saying he has a training in London and cannot jeopardize his career at this juncture. Shyamal gradually becomes distant from his family in pursuit of a successful career. He moves to a swanky apartment in Kolkata leaving behind his ancestral home in Shonarpur. They soon adapt to the hi-life in Kolkata however his wife Charu still longs for the simple life back in Sonarpur.

The plot heats up when Runu Sanyal tries to sign up Hari Bose as the brand ambassador for their company and Shyamal tries to crack a successful deal. Both of them confident that these achievements could put them in the VP's shoes. In the meanwhile Charu meets Hari Bose at the club. Hari is attracted to her and they end up going on a date on her birthday. The rat race gets dirty when Runu Sanyal uncovers the fact that Shyamal has slept with his Assistant Duli while they were gone for a business trip and this puts Shyamal in a dicy position. Unable to face the truth Shyamal escaped to his ancestral home in Sonarpur and finds solace in his brother's kind words.

On Charu's insistence Hari Bose turns down the deal with the company saying that Runu Sanyal has made this agreement with him on an understanding that he has to impart a percentage of his remuneration to Runu. All these incidents lead the Chairman of the company to select Shyamal as the new VP. Assistant Duli delivers the letter to Shyamal's residence.

The film ends as Shyamal, now a changed man comes back to his wife and she welcomes the Vice President home.

== Cast ==
- Joya Ahsan as Charu Sen
- Tota Roy Chowdhury as Shyamal Sen
- Reshmi Ghosh as Duli
- Abir Chatterjee as Hori Bose
- Locket Chatterjee as Runu Sanyal's wife
- Saswata Chatterjee as Ranadeep Sanyal aka Runu Sanyal
- Kaushik Ganguly as Shymal's elder brother
- Pijush Ganguly as Jyoti
- Ritwick Chakraborty as Siddhartha
- Biplab Chatterjee as Shyamal's father

== Soundtrack ==
- "Ami Akash Khola" - Ujjaini Mukherjee
- 'Mon Uthlo Dekh" - Nirmalya Roy, Ujjaini Mukherjee
- "Pore Ei Mon" - June Banerjee
- "Mask Dance" - Bickram Ghosh, Soumya Maradona Ghosh
- "Title Music-A Day Unravels" - Soumya Maradona Ghosh
