= Arindam Sil =

Indian actor, film director and film producer

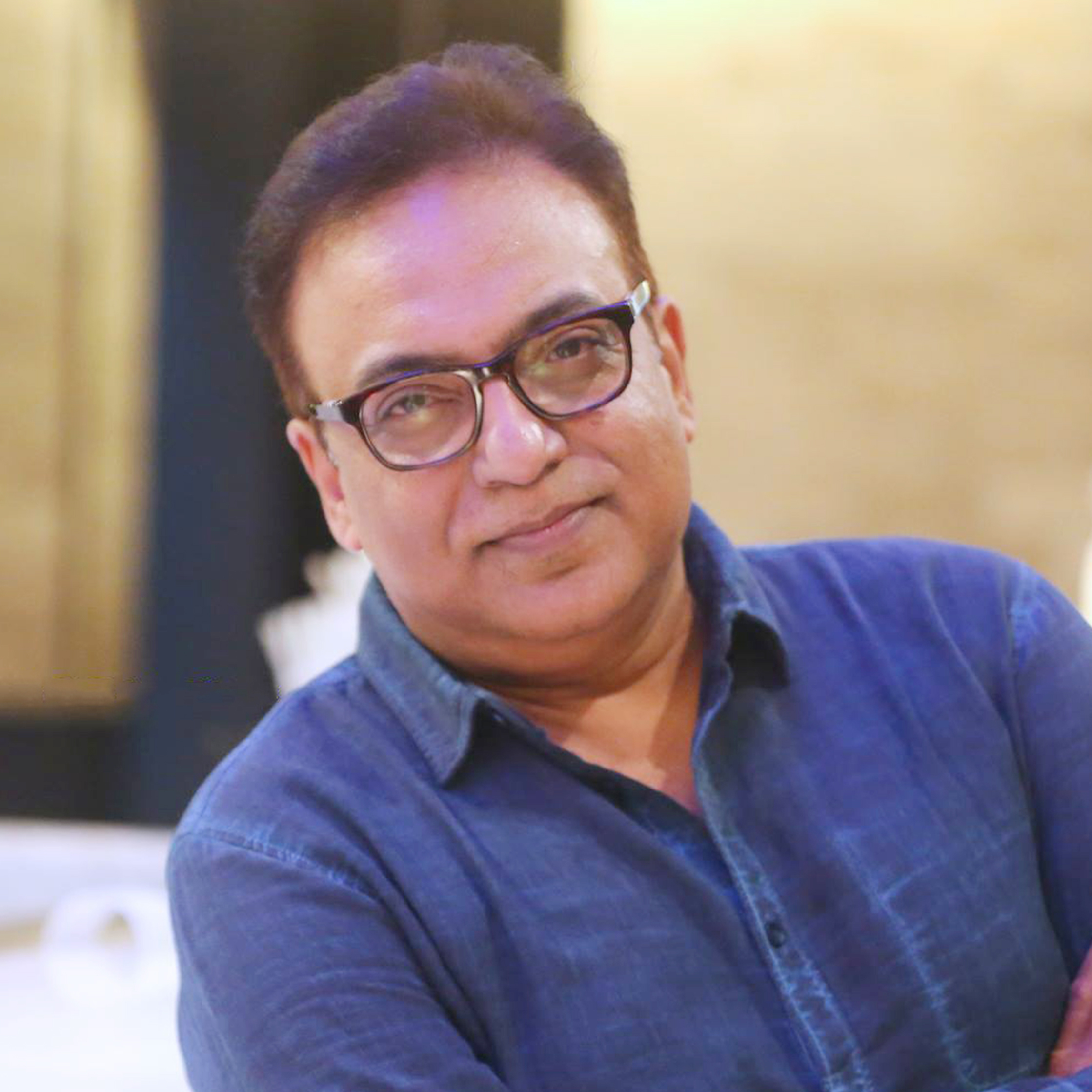
- Sil in 2014
- Born: 12 March 1964 (age 62); Calcutta, West Bengal, India
- Occupations: Actor, film director and film producer

Arindam Sil (born 12 March 1964) is an Indian actor, film director and line producer who predominantly works in Bengali films.

== Early life ==
Sil was born on 12 March 1964 in North Calcutta. He was a student of St. Joseph's College, Calcutta, and St. Xavier's College, Kolkata. He then pursued M.B.A. in marketing from the Indian Institute of Social Welfare and Business Management at the University of Calcutta. He gave up his PhD to pursue his interest in becoming an actor.

== Career ==
In 2012 he directed a movie Aborto. Sil and his company, Nothing Beyond Cinema, has managed the line-production of films like The Bong Connection, Via Darjeeling, 033, Brake Fail, Shukno Lanka, Nobel Chor, Kahaani, Detective Byomkesh Bakshi, TE3N, Meri Pyari Bindu', among others.

== Filmography ==
=== Director ===
Denotes films that have not yet been released

Year	Title	Ref.
2013	Aborto	
2015	Ebar Shabor	
2015	Har Har Byomkesh	
2015	Swade Ahlade	
2016	Eagoler Chokh	
2016	Byomkesh Pawrbo	
2017	Durga Sohay	
2017	Dhananjay	
2018	Aschhe Abar Shabor	
2018	Byomkesh Gotro	
2019	Mitin Mashi	
2022	Mahananda	
2022	Tirandaj Shabor	
2022	Byomkesh Hotyamancha	
2022	Khela Jawkhon	
2023	Maayakumari	
2023	Shabash Feluda	
2023	Jongole Mitin Mashi	
2023	Iskaboner Bibi	
2025	Mitin: Ekti Khunir Sandhaney	
2026	Korpur	

=== Actor ===
- Gungun Kore Mahua (2026)
- Afghaani Snow (2023)
- Sada Ronger Prithibi (2023)
- Shabash Feluda (2023)
- Lost (2023)
- Tirandaj Shabor (2022)
- Mahananda (2022)
- Bhalo Meye Kharap Meye (2019)
- Durgeshgorer Guptodhon (2019)
- Finally Bhalobasha (2019)
- Guptodhoner Sondhane (2018)
- Eagoler Chokh (2016) (cameo)
- Har Har Byomkesh (2015) (cameo)
- Shudhu Tomari Jonyo (2015) Nayantara's Father
- Buno Haansh (2014)
- Kaal Madhumas (2013)
- Target Kolkata (2013)
- Asbo Aar Ekdin (2012)
- Laptop (2012) Raya's Father
- Nobel Chor (2012)
- Arekti Premer Golpo (2010)
- Ekti Tarar Khonje (2010)
- Sob Choritro Kalponik (2009)
- Brake Fail (2009)
- Via Darjeeling (2008)
- Tolly Lights (2008)
- Chalo Let's Go (2008)
- Bow Barracks Forever (2007)
- The Bong Connection (2007)
- Netaji Subhas Chandra Bose: The Forgotten Hero (2005)
- Dwitio Paksha (2004)
- Mahulbanir Sereng (2004)
- Annadaata (2002)
- Debdas (2002)
- Moner Majhe Tumi (2002)
- Cancer (2001)
- Hey Ram (2000)
- Shesh Thikana (2000)
- Sankha Sindurer Dibyi (1999)
- Shatru Mitra (1999)
- Swapno Niye (1999)
- Tumi Ele Taai (1999)
- Lathi (1996)

=== Television ===
- Ek Akasher Niche (2002–2005)
- Sholo Aana (2009–2013)
- Ishti Kutum (2011–2013)

=== Executive producer ===
- Meri Pyaari Bindu (2017)
- Kahaani 2: Durga Rani Singh (2016)
- Te3n (2016)
- Detective Byomkesh Bakshy!
- Gunday (2014)
- Kahaani (2012)
- Nobel Chor (2012)
- Shukno Lanka (2010)
- 033 (2010)
- Brake Fail (2009)
- Via Darjeeling (2008)
- The Bong Connection (2007)

== See also ==
- Pijush Ganguly
- Paran Bandopadhyay
