= Raakh =

- Theatrical release poster (France)
- Directed by: Aditya Bhattacharya
- Written by: Aditya Bhattacharya; Nuzhat Khan
- Produced by: Asif Noor; Sangeeth Sivan; Aditya Bhattacharya
- Starring: Aamir Khan; Supriya Pathak; Pankaj Kapur
- Cinematography: Santosh Sivan
- Edited by: A. Sreekar Prasad
- Music by: Score: Ranjit Barot
- Release date: 21 April 1989
- Running time: 124 minutes
- Country: India
- Language: Hindi
- Box office: ₹15 million (equivalent to ₹170 million or US$1.8 million in 2026)

Raakh (transl. Ashes), released internationally as Ashes to Ashes, is a 1989 Indian Hindi-language action crime film directed by Aditya Bhattacharya, starring Aamir Khan and Supriya Pathak in the lead roles with Pankaj Kapur, Gajanan Bangera and Jagdeep.

The film was Aamir Khan's first movie after Qayamat Se Qayamat Tak and it received much critical acclaim and subsequently three National Film Awards in 1989 and developed a considerable following over the years. The film also marked the Bollywood debut of ace cinematographer Santosh Sivan and film editor A. Sreekar Prasad.

== Plot ==
As declared in the subtitles of the opening scene, the events of the film take place in a big city in India. After the police riots of 1990, the State Forces were disbanded and replaced by a central one. The police now had more powers. The crime rate continued to escalate. In the wealthier quarters of the city, though, life went on... but it was an uneasy calm.

Aamir (Aamir Khan) had just turned 21. He is from a rich family. The only colour in his otherwise mundane life was his obsession for Neeta, an older, more pragmatic woman, who likes him, but does not share his plans for their future.

One night, on their way back from a party, Neeta is molested by a local crime boss, Hassan Karmali, and Amir intervenes violently. On their way back home in their car, they are intercepted by Karmali, and his goons, and Karmali rapes Neeta, with Aamir watching helplessly. Unknown to Aamir, an off-duty police officer is a silent witness to the incident. Frustrated, possessed by impotent rage and a sense of injustice, Aamir has to find release. He leaves home... he turns to Sub-Inspector Kapoor – the silent witness. Kapoor, pretending to be unaware of the incident, agrees to help Aamir, as, in spite of dancing to their tunes, Kapoor hates the Karmalis and his inability to act against them. (Years ago, Kapoor had taken on the Karmali clan, an unwise move that nearly destroyed his career.)

Aamir now feels he has a friend. Till one day, realising the truth, he is shattered. Soon after, S.I. Kapoor is suspended after he loses control in front of his superiors at a party thrown by Karmali and tries to shoot him. His life begins to spiral downwards. Now alone, frightened, without a job, and with nothing to lose, he sees in Aamir the means to fulfill his dark, unresolved dreams, which have by now taken the form of an obsession.

Together they set about eliminating their common enemy – members of the dreaded Karmali family. Kapoor, the embittered cop, becomes a dark mentor to the innocent but fearless Aamir. Neeta, unaware of the changes in Aamir's life, has decided to put her past behind her. She begins, slowly but painfully, to reconstruct her life.

Meanwhile, Aamir slips into a vortex of terrifying violence – a road to certain doom. While the first murder he commits drives Amir almost crazy with guilt, slowly, he gets used to it and even starts enjoying it. Theirs is a war with no victors, a battle that has no glory. Amidst the lies of a logical life, sometimes the only truth is in madness, in losing control. Finally, Kapoor and Aamir manage to corner Karmali at his sister's wedding. As Kapoor shoots Karmali dead, he is shot at and killed by one of his corrupt ex-colleagues. After Kapoor dies in his arms, Aamir picks up his gun and supposedly shoots down the corrupt cop. The last scene once again returns to the opening sequence, where Aamir, now on death row, contemplates the events of his short and poignant life.

== Cast ==
- Aamir Khan - Amir Hussein
- Supriya Pathak - Neeta
- Pankaj Kapur - Inspector P.K.
- Jagdeep - Ustad
- Gajanan Bangera - Inspector
- Naina Balsaver - Naina
- Homi Wadia - Hassan Karmali
- Madhukar Toradmal - Karmali Seth

== Crew ==
- Art Direction – Partho Sengupta

== Re-release ==
This film was to be re-released in theatres in India on 12 June 2009 after 20 years with digitally re-mastered prints, by the film producers together with Palador Pictures. It was to be followed by DVD release in August 2009. The scheduled re-release eventually did not happen due to certain undisclosed reasons, ostensibly because it fell during a producer-multiplex owner standoff during the period.

== Awards ==
36th National Film Awards:

Won

- Best Supporting Actor – Pankaj Kapur
- Special Mention (Feature Film) – Aamir Khan
- Best Editing – A. Sreekar Prasad

35th Filmfare Awards:

Nominated

- Best Actor – Aamir Khan
- Best Supporting Actor – Pankaj Kapur
- Best Story – Aditya Bhattacharya
