= Mohan Polamar =

Mohan Polamar is the founder and co-MD of Palador Pictures, a company that acquires award-winning foreign language films called world cinema and distributes them via different modes including DVD, TV and Theater in the Indian Subcontinent. The company owns close to 1000 of these World cinema titles and claim it to be the world's greatest cinema selection He founded the company with Gautam Shiknis. Mohan is also the founder of no2co2.in, India's only carbon footprint calculator.
