= Nabendu Ghosh =

Indian author and screenwriter (1917-2007)

- Born: 27 March 1917; Kalatia, Keraniganj Upazila, Dhaka District, British India (present-day Bangladesh)
- Died: 15 December 2007 (aged 90); Kolkata
- Other names: Mukul; Nabendu Bhushan Ghosh
- Occupations: Author, screenplay writer

Nabendu Ghosh (27 March 1917 – 15 December 2007) was an Indian author in Bengali literature, and screenwriter. He has written screenplays of classic Bollywood movies like, Sujata, Bandini, Devdas, Majhli Didi, Abhimaan and Teesri Kasam. He has written stories for movies like Baap Beti, Shatranj, Raja Jani. He has also acted briefly in Do Bigha Zameen, Teesri Kasam and Lukochuri. Later in his career, he directed four movies as well.

== Biography ==
Nabendu Ghosh was born on 27 March 1917 in Kalatia, Keraniganj Upazila, Dhaka District, Bengal Presidency, British India (present-day Bangladesh). At the age of 12 he became a popular actor on stage. As an acclaimed dancer in Uday Shankar style, he won several medals between 1939 and 1945. Ghosh lost a government job in 1944 for writing Dak Diye Jaai, set against the Quit India Movement launched by Indian National Congress. The novel catapulted him to fame and he moved to Calcutta in 1945. He soon ranked among the most progressive young writers in Bengali literature.

After partition, Urdu was declared the state language of East Pakistan; thereby banning all Bengali literature and films. It was this political division that prompted Nabendu Ghosh to join Bimal Roy in 1951, when he left New Theatres in Kolkata, to make films for Bombay Talkies. Others in the team who also shifted were Hrishikesh Mukherjee, Asit Sen, Paul Mahendra, Kamal Bose and later Salil Chaudhury. After Bimal Roy's death, Ghosh worked extensively with Hrishikesh Mukherjee.

Nabendu Ghosh has written on all historical upheavals of 1940s – famine, riots, partition – as well as love. His oeuvre bears the distinct stamp of his outlook towards life. His literary efforts are 'pointing fingers.' There is a multi-coloured variety, a deep empathy for human emotions, mysterious layers of meaning, subtle symbolism, description of unbearable life. Love for humanity is also reflected in his writings. He has to his credit 26 novels and 14 collections of short story. He directed the film Trishagni (1988), based on Saradindu Bandopadhyay's historical short story Maru O Sangha.

He died on 15 December 2007. He is survived by two sons, Dr Dipankar and filmmaker Shubhankar, and daughter Ratnottama Sengupta (film festival curator, author, and former The Times of India film journalist). His wife Kanaklata had died in 1999. His autobiography, Eka Naukar Jatri was published in March 2008. His daughter-in-law, Dr Soma Ghosh is an acclaimed classical vocalist, and was conferred with the Padma Shree award in 2016.

To commemorate his birth centenary, an English translation of his science fiction novel, Aami o Aami (1999), was released on 25 March 2017. He had worked on the translation with his grandson, Devottam Sengupta. The book is known as Me and I in English.

== Filmography ==
Story writer

- Kayahiner Kahini (1973)

Screenwriter

- Parineeta (1953)
- Biraj Bahu (1954)
- Baadbaan (1954)
- Aar Paar (1954)
- Devdas (1955)
- Yahudi (1958)
- Insan Jaag Utha (1959)
- Sujata (1959)
- Bandini (1963)
- Teesri Kasam (1966)
- Majhli Didi (1967)
- Sharafat (1970)
- Lal Patthar (1971)
- Abhimaan (1973)
- Jheel Ke Us Paar (1973)
- Do Anjaane (1976)
- Ganga Ki Saugandh (1978)
- Krodhi (1981)

Director

- Parineeta (1953) (assistant director)
- Trishagni (1988)
- Netraheen Sakshi (1992)
- Ladkiyaan (1997)
- Anmol Ratan: Ashok Kumar (Documentary/ 1995)

== Awards ==
=== Literary awards ===
- Bankim Puraskar from the Bangla Academy, Govt. of West Bengal
- Haraprasad Ghosh Medal from Bangiya Sahitya Parishad
- Bibhuti Bhushan Sahitya Arghya
- Bimal Mitra Puraskar
- Amrita Puraskar

=== Film awards ===
- 1997: Honoris Causa conferred by Film and Television Institute of India for his "Significant Contribution to Indian Cinema"
- 1988: National Film Award for Best First Film of a Director – Trishagni
- 1969: Filmfare Best Screenplay Award, Majhli Didi (1969)
- BFJA Award for Best Screenplay: Majhli Didi (1969)
- BFJA Award for Best Screenplay: Teesri Kasam (1967)
- Film World Award for Best Screenplay (Do Anjaane)
