= Chiriyakhana (novel) =

1953 Bengali detective novella by Sharadindu Bandyopadhyay

- Author: Sharadindu Bandyopadhyay
- Original title: চিড়িয়াখানা
- Language: Bengali
- Series: Byomkesh Bakshi
- Genre: Detective, crime, mystery
- Publication date: 1953
- Publication place: India
- Media type: Print (hardback & paperback)
- Preceded by: Durgo Rahasya (1952)
- Followed by: Adim Ripu (1955)

Chiriyakhana (Bengali: চিড়িয়াখানা, lit. 'Zoo') is a 1953 Indian Bengali-language mystery novel written by Sharadindu Bandyopadhyay, featuring the iconic sleuth Byomkesh Bakshi and his associate Ajit. It is the thirteenth instalment of the Byomkesh Bakshi series and is considered by critics and fans as one of the finest and darkest cases in the detective's career.

== Plot ==
The narrative commences in April 1946, in Calcutta (Kolkata), where Mr. Nishanath Sen, a retired judicial officer and proprietor of the extensive horticultural establishment known as Golap Colony, contacts the private investigator, Byomkesh Bakshi, a self-styled Satyanweshi (seeker of truth), and his associate, the author Ajit. Golap Colony serves as a refuge for individuals marginalized by society, often possessing prior criminal records or other characteristics that render them social outcasts. Mr. Sen seeks assistance in resolving the peculiar issue of vehicle components being projected into his residence via the window opening. Byomkesh ascertains that twelve years prior, Mr. Sen had presided over the case of Lal Singh, a motor garage owner, and had sentenced him to death for the homicide of an employee. Lal Singh's sentence was subsequently reduced to fourteen years imprisonment upon appeal to the high court, with the possibility of early release for commendable conduct. Concurrently, Mr. Sen requests an investigation into an actress named Sunayana, whom he suspects is residing within Golap Colony under an assumed identity.

Byomkesh meets with Ramen Mallick, an expert on Bengali cinema, and receives information regarding the murder of Murari, a jeweler's son. Murari was fatally poisoned with nicotine in his own room while engaged in intimacy with Sunayana (whose actual name was Nityakali), and a necklace valued at 20,000 rupees was also pilfered. An arrest warrant was issued for Sunayana on suspicion of involvement in the murder, but she vanished without a trace. Ramen furnishes details concerning the actress, including her filmography, and offers his support to Byomkesh.

The following day, Byomkesh, Ajit, and Ramen visit Golap Colony. Mr. Sen resides there with his spouse, Damayanti, and his nephew, Bijoy, who manages a local flower shop. The colony residents include Panugopal (a mute and hard-of-hearing individual responsible for livestock care), Professor Nepal Gupta and his daughter Mukul, Brajadas (a priest and amateur veterinarian), Dr. Bhujangadhar Das (a resident for over four years and a sitar virtuoso), and Banalakkhi (the colony's tailor). Professor Gupta, a former biochemist, was previously suspected of manufacturing explosives following a laboratory explosion, which resulted in his dismissal and subsequent police scrutiny. He now operates a small laboratory on the premises, ostensibly developing ineffective fertilizers. Brajadas was formerly a court clerk discharged for corrupt practices and sentenced to six years imprisonment by Nishanath Sen. Other residents include Mr. Sen's employees, Rasik De and Mushkil Mia, and the latter's wife, Nazar Bibi.

Professor Gupta expresses dissatisfaction with Brajadas's management of the animals and proposes that, as a biochemist, he should assume responsibility, a suggestion that offends Brajadas. Mr. Sen intervenes, cautioning Gupta against interfering with Brajadas or facing expulsion, leading to Gupta's extreme displeasure and a threat to disclose "everything." Dr. Das, whose medical license was suspended after he performed an illegal abortion to protect a young woman, mentions that he returned to India after his marriage to a Caucasian woman dissolved. He suggests that Professor Gupta is attempting to intimidate Mr. Sen to gain control of the colony and accuses Damayanti of harboring romantic feelings for Professor Gupta. On the subsequent day, Byomkesh speaks with Bijoy, who becomes visibly agitated when questioned about Mukul, and delivers a letter from Mr. Sen.

The letter instructs Byomkesh to terminate the investigation. However, shortly thereafter, Bijoy telephones Byomkesh to report Mr. Sen's demise. Dr. Nagen Pal is summoned for a preliminary examination. It is noted that the deceased was wearing warm socks in the height of summer, despite being a chronic patient of elevated blood pressure. The time of death is estimated between 10 and 11 PM, and the absence of external injuries suggests brain hemorrhage as the likely cause. Dr. Pal confirms that wearing warm socks in hot weather would exacerbate blood pressure. Bijoy had been in Calcutta earlier that day but returned at 12:30 AM and retired for the night. Mukul's discovery of Damayanti's outcry the next morning alerted the colony to the death. Professor Gupta informs Byomkesh that Mukul desired marriage with Bijoy, who initially agreed but later became involved with a woman of "loose character" (Banalaxmi) and neglected Mukul. Subsequently, the investigating officer, Inspector Pramod Barat, arrives. Upon removal of the socks, marks consistent with binding ropes are observed on Mr. Sen's legs. A fractured bird's nest is found beneath the bed, with fragments on the ceiling fan. Meanwhile, Rasik has vanished, seemingly after misappropriating Colony funds. Byomkesh postulates that Mr. Sen was suspended head-down from the ceiling, secured by ropes around his legs, resulting in his death from cerebral pressure rupture. The bird's nest was disturbed when the body was lowered, and the perpetrator neglected to remove the socks. Mr. Sen was likely incapacitated before the torture. Byomkesh finds it suspicious that Damayanti, occupying the adjacent room, heard nothing. Bijoy and Damayanti are the sole and equal heirs to Mr. Sen's estate. Byomkesh also learns that Lal Singh died in custody, and his wife's whereabouts are unknown. Brajadas has been missing since Mr. Sen's death.

A detailed interrogation is initiated. Damayanti discloses that she married Mr. Sen ten years ago when she was 19 and he was 47. Bijoy has lived with them since the death of his parents a decade ago. Damayanti claims she went to sleep at 10 PM on the night of the death, at which time Mr. Sen was alive and asleep. Bijoy alleges that upon his return from Calcutta that night, he received an anonymous missive demanding his presence in the city under threat of revealing his secrets. He traveled to the designated meeting point but waited until 11 PM without encountering anyone before returning home. Bijoy also admits to having embezzled Colony funds. Concurrently, Banalakkhi sustains a head injury necessitating bed rest.

Professor Gupta asserts he was engaged in a game of chess with Mukul between 10 PM and 11 PM. Panugopal attempts to communicate information, but his meaning is unintelligible. Dr. Das claims he was playing the sitar, while Banalakkhi states she was sewing and heard no musical performance. Banalakkhi professes an admiration for Dr. Das and sought sitar lessons, but refused his demand for sexual favors.

The following day, Panugopal is discovered deceased, having been fatally poisoned with nicotine introduced into an ear medication he regularly consumed. Mukul is again the first to find the body. Byomkesh becomes determined to seek retribution. Several days later, Byomkesh, adopting a disguise, observes Dr. Das visiting a clandestine residence in a red-light district. Both Rasik and Brajadas are located, though both decline to explain their disappearance following Mr. Sen's death. Brajadas confirms hearing the sitar being played on the night of Mr. Sen's murder, though he did not visually confirm Dr. Das as the player. Under interrogation, a remorseful Brajadas confesses that Damayanti is actually Lal Singh's wife and that she and Mr. Sen were never married. Bijoy, then 13, took pity on the 19-year-old Damayanti and provided her refuge in Mr. Sen's residence. Upon discovery, Mr. Sen rebuked Bijoy but permitted Damayanti to remain.

When Byomkesh confronts Damayanti again, she tearfully reveals that seven months earlier, she received a letter from Lal Singh demanding money, instructing her to place Rs 500 at the colony gate between 10 PM and 11 PM each time he threw a vehicle part onto the property. On the night of Mr. Sen's death, Damayanti received a final letter stating Lal Singh was relocating to Punjab and wished to see her one last time at the colony gate between 10 PM and 11 PM. She went to the gate but encountered no one. Byomkesh informs her dispassionately that Lal Singh had expired in prison two years earlier.

Byomkesh employs a final ruse, placing two photographs of Sunayana (provided by Ramen) into separate envelopes, which he entrusts to the two main suspects: Professor Gupta and Dr. Das. He suggests this is a precaution against a potential lethal attack, ensuring the killer's identity is confirmed should he die. After a few days, Byomkesh retrieves the envelopes, finding one to have been tampered with.

Byomkesh assembles all individuals and discloses that Banalakkhi is, in fact, Sunayana and the spouse of Dr. Bhujangadhar Das, who is a skilled plastic surgeon. Banalakkhi had undergone plastic surgery to alter her facial features and replace two front teeth with prosthetics. She had also been deceiving both Bijoy and Rasik, leading to substantial misappropriation of Colony funds. Byomkesh identifies Dr. Das as the murderer based on the tampering of his envelope, attributing it to the doctor's fear of Byomkesh's capabilities and a guilty conscience. Furthermore, he reveals that Banalakkhi, not Dr. Das, was playing the sitar on the night of the murder. When Dr. Das scoffs, Byomkesh asserts that his secret residence has been searched, and while he cannot be prosecuted for the two Colony murders, he will face trial for Murari's murder, with the stolen necklace found in the house serving as evidence. Defeated, Dr. Das and Banalakkhi commit suicide by ingesting cyanide capsules.

The subsequent day, Byomkesh informs Ajit that Banalakkhi had deliberately inflicted the head injury to facilitate the wearing of false teeth and avert suspicion. Barat and Bijoy visit Byomkesh, who explains that Dr. Das and Banalakkhi were passionate, inherent criminals. Following their registry marriage in London and facing threats, they settled in the colony to evade detection. Bijoy had revealed Mr. Sen's secret concerning Damayanti to Mukul and Banalakkhi. Mukul informed Professor Gupta, and Banalakkhi informed Dr. Das, who recognized an opportunity for further embezzlement and began extorting Damayanti. When Mr. Sen engaged Byomkesh, Dr. Das resolved to eliminate him, using fabricated letters to ensure the absence of Damayanti and Bijoy. Banalakkhi played the sitar that evening, allowing Dr. Das to enter Mr. Sen's house and commit the murder. Panugopal, having witnessed a compromising event, was subsequently eliminated by Dr. Das. The narrative concludes optimistically with Bijoy and Mukul reconciling.

== Themes ==
Chiriyakhana explores several themes:

- The Metaphor of the Zoo (Chiriyakhana): The entire setting of Golap Colony acts as a microcosm of society, populated by outcasts, former criminals, and social rejects. The title serves as a psychological allegory, suggesting that civilization is merely a thin veneer masking base human instincts, deceit, and predatory behavior.
- Identity and Deception: Identity is fluid and frequently weaponized throughout the novel. Characters live under assumed names, wear disguises, or alter their physical appearances—most notably Banalakkhi, who is actually the fugitive actress Sunayana and uses plastic surgery and false teeth to conceal her past and evade justice for murder.
- Crime, Guilt, and Vengeance: The narrative investigates how past transgressions ripple through time. Characters are bound by historical crimes—such as Lal Singh's past conviction or the unresolved murder of Murari—demonstrating that guilt and the desire for retribution eventually catch up with perpetrators.
- Extortion, Blackmail, and Exploitation: Vulnerabilities are systematically exploited for financial gain. Dr. Das and Banalakkhi capitalize on hidden secrets, embezzlement, and fear, turning the residents' personal shames and illegal pasts into instruments of blackmail.
- Social Marginalization and Redemption: Golap Colony was founded by Nishanath Sen as a sanctuary for society's discarded individuals. The novel explores the complex interplay between rehabilitation and inherent criminality, contrasting genuine attempts at starting over with deep-seated, unregenerate criminal natures.
- The Illusion of Truth vs. Deception: As a Satyanweshi (seeker of truth), Byomkesh Bakshi's journey highlights the arduous process of cutting through layers of fabrication, red herrings, and false confessions to unmask hidden realities.

== Literary significance ==
Chiriyakhana holds a pioneering place in Bengali detective literature by elevating the traditional whodunit into a complex psychological study of human nature and urban alienation. By framing Golap Colony as a literal menagerie of society's outcasts, the novel uses the zoo metaphor to subvert the comforting binary of the innocent citizen and the deviant criminal, suggesting instead that civilization is merely a fragile cage. Furthermore, through its intricate web of hidden identities, plastic surgery, and historical guilt, the narrative moves beyond mere puzzle-solving to examine how past transgressions fester beneath the surface of modern society, cementing Byomkesh Bakshi not just as a solver of crimes, but as a profound seeker of psychological and social truths.

== Adaptations ==
=== Film ===
The novel was loosely adapted into the critically acclaimed 1967 Bengali film in 1967 of Satyajit Ray, named Chiriyakhana, and starred Uttam Kumar as Byomkesh Bakshi. Vast amount of creative liberties took place:

- In the novel, Byomkesh, Ajit, and Ramen Mallick visit Golap Colony openly as themselves on the first day. In the film, Byomkesh enters the colony in disguise as a Japanese horticulturist named Okakura, with Ajit posing as his Indian assistant.
- In the novel, Mr. Sen approaches Byomkesh because vehicle components are being thrown through his window, and he suspects Sunayana is hiding in the colony. In the film, Sen's initial prompt focuses heavily on searching for the details of an old Bengali movie song ("Bhalobasar tumi ki jano") and the actress Sunayana.
- Several minor residents and employees of Golap Colony present in the book are condensed or altered.
- In the novel, Mr. Sen is suspended head-down from the ceiling by his legs (causing a cerebral pressure rupture) and is discovered wearing warm socks in summer with rope marks on his legs, alongside a fractured bird's nest. In the film, Sen is bludgeoned to death with a blunt weapon.
- In the film, a crucial change is that Byomkesh hears the crime or background sounds live over an unfinished phone call from Sen before he is killed (or hears the recorded sitar tape evidence later as revealed in the climax).
- In the novel, the inspector arrives after Sen's death is discovered and investigates alongside Byomkesh. In the film, the inspector visits Byomkesh and Ajit first, completely unaware that they had a pre-existing relationship with the deceased Sen.
- In the novel, Panugopal is killed by nicotine poisoning introduced into his ear medication. In the film, Panu is eliminated using the same weapon and method as was used to kill Mr. Sen.
- The film introduces specific contemporary gadgets for Byomkesh's investigation, most notably his use of a voice recorder to record interrogations of the suspects, which does not feature in the original text.
- In the novel, Byomkesh unmasks Dr. Das and Banalakkhi through a psychological ruse involving two photographs in separate envelopes and discovering that Dr. Das's envelope was tampered with. In the film, Byomkesh notices a plastic flower in his room, which triggers his realization about plastic surgery and leads him to re-examine the photographs.
- In the novel, Banalakkhi plays the sitar on the night of the murder to provide Dr. Das an alibi, and Brajadas confirms hearing the sitar. In the film, Dr. Das uses a pre-recorded tape of himself playing the sitar in his room to build his alibi, which Byomkesh uncovers.
- In the novel, Byomkesh finds the stolen necklace from the Murari case hidden in Dr. Das's secret red-light district hideout. In the film, Byomkesh uncovers the stolen jewelry alongside the contract papers of "Sunayana" which Dr. Das was hiding.
- In the novel, both Dr. Das and Banalakkhi commit suicide by swallowing cyanide capsules after being exposed, followed by a subsequent day wrap-up scene with Barat and Bijoy. In the film, Banalakkhi confesses directly to how her husband exploited her beauty and murdered Murari, Sen, and Panu to destroy evidence, streamlining the dramatic confrontation.

The film's reception was initially mixed. It was once considered Ray's worst film due to its complex plot and perceived unfaithfulness to the source material. However, Uttam Kumar's flexible acting was praised by many critics at the time. Over time, the film has gained appreciation for its complexity and Ray's unique interpretation of the story.

=== Television ===
The story has been adapted multiple times for television:

- It was part of the popular Byomkesh Bakshi television series aired on Doordarshan from 1993 to 1997. The adaptation was split into two episodes:
  - "Chiryaghar - Part 1" (Season 1, Episode 13), aired on May 9, 1993
  - "Chiryaghar - Part 2" (Season 1, Episode 14), aired on May 16, 1993

This adaptation marked the end of the first season of the classic series and cemented Rajit Kapur's popularity as Byomkesh Bakshi.

== Publication ==
Chiriyakhana has been published multiple times, both individually and as part of collections of Byomkesh Bakshi stories. An English translation titled The Menagerie and Other Byomkesh Bakshi Mysteries is available, making the story accessible to a wider audience.

The story continues to be popular among fans of detective fiction and is often included in discussions and analyses of classic Bengali literature.

== Legacy ==
Chiriyakhana remains one of the most popular and widely discussed stories in the Byomkesh Bakshi series. Its complex plot, well-developed characters, and atmospheric setting have captivated readers for generations. The novel's intriguing narrative and thought-provoking themes have contributed to its enduring popularity in Bengali literature and solidified its place as a classic in the detective fiction genre.
