= Amriter Mrityu =

Bengali detective novella by Sharadindu Bandyopadhyay

- Author: Sharadindu Bandyopadhyay
- Original title: অমৃতের মৃত্যু
- Language: Bengali
- Series: Byomkesh Bakshi
- Genre: Detective, crime, mystery
- Publication date: 1958
- Publication place: India
- Media type: Print (hardback & paperback)
- Preceded by: Monimondon
- Followed by: Shailo Rahasya

Amriter Mrityu (Bengali: অমৃতের মৃত্যু), translated as "Amrit's Death", is a 1958 Bengali detective novella by Sharadindu Bandyopadhyay. It is the 18th story in the famous Byomkesh Bakshi series and follows the exploits of the detective Byomkesh Bakshi, who, along with his friend and chronicler Ajit Bandyopadhyay, solves mysteries in Bengal. The story is notable for its rural setting and its exploration of post-war arms smuggling and crime.

== Plot ==
The story begins with detective Byomkesh Bakshi and his friend Ajit Bandyopadhyay arriving in the village of Santalgola to investigate suspected arms smuggling. They work undercover, with Byomkesh posing as a businessman to avoid drawing attention to their true purpose.

Shortly after their arrival, a series of mysterious events unfold

A young man named Amrit is found dead in the nearby forest. Before his death, Amrit had claimed to have seen a ghost rider on a black horse in the woods at night. This sighting is initially dismissed as the imagination of a superstitious villager.

Another local resident, Sadananda Sur, is killed by a bomb blast upon returning home from a trip. This second death raises suspicions and complicates the case further.

As Byomkesh begins his investigation, he uncovers several intriguing elements:

- Rumors of illegal activities happening in the forest at night
- The presence of a mysterious black horse that becomes a recurring element in witness accounts
- Recent financial transactions and relationships between various villagers
- The strategic importance of certain locations in and around the village

The detective's investigation leads him through a complex web of local relationships, hidden motives, and deceptive appearances. He must navigate the rural setting, where traditional beliefs often clash with modern crime, and where the aftermath of war has left its mark on the community.

Byomkesh employs his keen observational skills and deductive reasoning to piece together the puzzle. He realizes that the solution to the arms smuggling case is intricately linked to the mysterious deaths and the legend of the ghost rider.

As the story progresses, Byomkesh gets closer to uncovering the truth, but also finds himself in increasing danger. The novella builds tension as the detective races against time to solve the case before more lives are lost.

The story culminates in a clever trap set by Byomkesh to expose the true culprit, leading to a dramatic confrontation that reveals the full extent of the criminal activities taking place in Santalgola.

== Characters ==
- Byomkesh Bakshi – the detective
- Ajit Bandyopadhyay – Byomkesh's friend and chronicler
- Amrit – a young villager whose mysterious death sparks the investigation
- Sadananda Sur – a villager killed by a bomb blast
- Bishwanath Mallick – the owner of a rice mill and the main antagonist
- Sukhmoy Daroga – the local police officer

== Themes ==
The novella explores several themes, including:

- Post-war arms smuggling in rural Bengal
- The contrast between appearances and reality
- The complexities of human nature and motivation
- The power of deductive reasoning in solving crimes

== Publication history ==
Amriter Mrityu was first published in 1958. It has since been included in various collections of Byomkesh Bakshi stories, most notably in the comprehensive Byomkesh Samagra by Ananda Publishers.

The story has been translated into English and included in collections such as The Rhythm of Riddles: The Adventures of Byomkesh Bakshi, published by HarperCollins India.

== Adaptations ==
=== Television ===
This story was adapted as the episode titled "Amrit Ki Maut" of the Byomkesh Bakshi (1993–1997) television series, starring Rajit Kapur as Byomkesh Bakshi. It aired on Doordarshan as the 6th episode of the 2nd season in 1997. The series was directed by Basu Chatterjee.

=== Other media ===
An audiobook version is available on YouTube, narrated in Bengali.
