= Kohen Kobi Kalidas =

Bengali detective novella by Sharadindu Bandyopadhyay

- Author: Sharadindu Bandyopadhyay
- Original title: কহেন কবি কালিদাস
- Translator: Rajat Chaudhuri (English)
- Language: Bengali
- Series: Byomkesh Bakshi
- Genre: Detective, crime, mystery
- Publisher: P.C. Sorkar and Sons
- Publication date: 1961
- Publication place: India
- Media type: Print (hardback & paperback)
- Preceded by: Achin Pakhi
- Followed by: Adrishyo Trikon

Kohen Kobi Kalidas (Bengali: কহেন কবি কালিদাস), translated as "Thus Spoke Kalidasa", is a 1961 Bengali detective novella by Sharadindu Bandyopadhyay. It is part of the famous Byomkesh Bakshi series and follows the exploits of the detective Byomkesh Bakshi, who, along with his friend and chronicler Ajit Bandyopadhyay, solves mysteries in Kolkata and beyond. The story is notable for its setting in a coal-mining town and its exploration of crime, mystery, and complex human emotions.

== Plot ==
Byomkesh Bakshi and Ajit Bandyopadhyay are invited by Manish Chakraborty, the owner of a coal mine, to investigate a series of mysterious accidents and disturbances in his mine. To maintain secrecy, Byomkesh assumes the alias "Gaganbabu," and Ajit becomes "Sujitbabu." They soon discover that the coal mine disturbances are tied to a much deeper and more dangerous plot involving murder and deception.

Phanish Chakraborty, Manish's son, confides in Byomkesh about his involvement in a gambling ring at the Coal Club, which eventually leads to a murder investigation involving a wealthy moneylender, Pranhari Poddar. As Byomkesh unravels the complex web of lies and deception, he discovers that the real culprit is closer than expected.

== Characters ==
- Byomkesh Bakshi (under the alias of Gaganbabu)
- Ajit Bandyopadhyay (under the alias of Sujitbabu)
- Manish Chakraborty – the wealthy coal mine owner who hires Byomkesh
- Phanish Chakraborty – Manish's son, who becomes involved in the murder investigation
- Indira – Phanish's wife
- Pranhari Poddar – a moneylender and gambler, found murdered
- Govinda Haldar – a prominent figure in the coal industry and a suspect
- Mohini – Poddar's maid, whose role becomes crucial in solving the mystery

== Publication history ==
Kohen Kobi Kalidas was first published in 1961 by P.C. Sorkar and Sons. It has since been included in various collections of Byomkesh Bakshi stories, most notably in the comprehensive Byomkesh Samagra by Ananda Publishers. The story has also been made available in digital format on platforms like Bengali Book.

== Translations ==
An English translation titled Thus Spoke Kalidasa was published as an e-book in 2020, translated by Rajat Chaudhuri. This translation has made the story accessible to a wider audience unfamiliar with Bengali.

A version by Humayun Ahmed is also available, though it is unclear if this is a translation or an adaptation.

== Adaptations ==
=== Television ===
This story was adapted as an episode in the Byomkesh Bakshi (1993–1997) television series, starring Rajit Kapur as Byomkesh Bakshi. It aired on Doordarshan and was part of the popular series directed by Basu Chatterjee.

Another TV adaptation appeared in the Byomkesh (2014) series on ETV Bangla, where the story was re-enacted.

=== Film ===
The 2015 Bengali film Byomkesh Bakshi, directed by Anjan Dutt, is based on the story Kohen Kobi Kalidas. This was the fourth installment in Dutt's Byomkesh Bakshi series, starring Jisshu Sengupta as Byomkesh, replacing Abir Chatterjee from the previous films. The film was released on 10 April 2015 and received critical acclaim.
