= Kahini (poetry collection) =

Book of poetry

Kahini (Bengali: কাহিনী; English: Tales) is a Bengali poetry book written by Rabindranath Tagore. It was published in 1900. It consists of 8 remarkable poems. These poems are reused in his another poetry collection "Katha O Kahini".

== List of poems ==
The poems of "Kahini" are:

1. Kato Ki Je Ashe
2. Gaanbhanga
3. Puratan Bhritya
4. Dui Bigha Jomi
5. Debatar Gras
6. Nishphal Upahar
7. Dinadaan
8. Bisarjon
