= Trishagni =

- Poster
- Directed by: Nabendu Ghosh
- Screenplay by: Nabendu Ghosh; K.Shailendra (dialogue)
- Based on: Moru O Sangho by Sharadindu Bandyopadhyay
- Produced by: NFDC
- Starring: Nana Patekar; Aloknath; Pallavi Joshi; Nitish Bhardwaj
- Music by: Salil Chowdhury
- Release date: 1988
- Running time: 102 min
- Country: India
- Language: Hindi

Trishagni (Hindi: तृषाग्नि, lit. 'The Sandstorm') is a 1988 Hindi film directed by Nabendu Ghosh, who also co-wrote the screenplay. The film was based on a historical short story set some time after the Asokan Missions, Moru O Sangho written by Saradindu Bandopadhyay, and inspired by Buddha's Fire Sermon. The film starred Nana Patekar, Aloknath, Nitish Bharadwaj, Pallavi Joshi in the lead roles.

The film received critical acclaim, and was awarded the 1988 National Film Award for Best First Film of a Director, "For excellent exploration of complex philosophical theme for the first time in Indian cinema."

== Synopsis ==
The film is set in the Buddhist town of Sariput in the deserts of Central Asia, around 200 B.C., when the town is struck by a devastating sandstorm that leaves only four survivors: two monks, and two children, taking refuge in the monastery. Twenty years later, the monks have aged, while the boy (Nitish Bhardwaj) and the girl (Pallavi Joshi) have grown up and fallen in love. The jealous monk deceitfully persuades the boy to become a monk, but the girl wins him back. As a result, both are expelled from the monastery, which is when the sandstorm strikes again.

== Cast ==
- Nana Patekar as Uchanda
- Aloknath as Thera
- Pallavi Joshi as Iti
- Nitish Bharadwaj as Nirvana

== Song ==
The film contains only one song, composed by Salil Chowdhury.

- "Aisa Lage Kahin Door Se" - Asha Bhosle

== Critical reception ==
Trishagni is also one of the films featured in Avijit Ghosh's book, 40 Retakes: Bollywood Classics You May Have Missed
