= Gautam Shiknis =

Gautam S. Shiknis
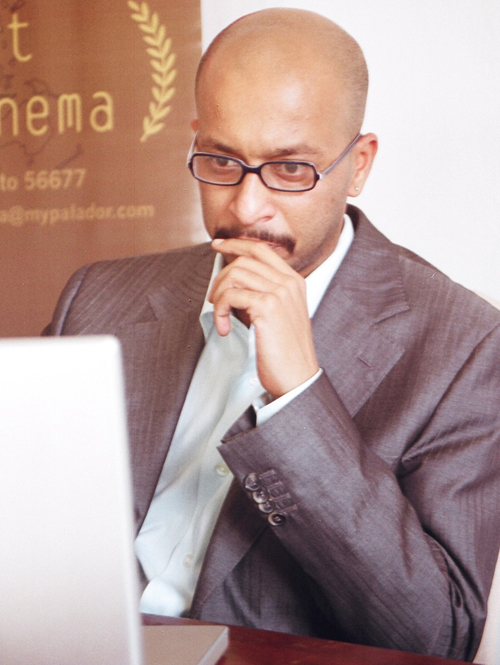
- Gautam Shiknis, November, 2007
- Born: 25 September 1971 (age 54); Mumbai, India
- Education: SVKM's NMIMS
- Occupations: Founder and Managing Director, Palador Pictures
- Website: www.mypalador.com

Gautam Shiknis is the Founder and MD of Palador Pictures, a company that acquires award-winning foreign language films called World cinema and distributes them via different modes including DVD, TV and Theater in the Indian Subcontinent. The company owns close to 1000 of these World cinema titles.

Gautam is an MBA and started his career with Saatchi and Saatchi. In September 2000 founded Theory M, a data analytics company which used technology for the first time in direct marketing. His next ventures were to form Goldfish Consulting Pvt. Ltd. and Frequency Entertainment. He also consulted for A Little World Pvt. Ltd. during this period.

Gautam began work in 2005 on a concept called Reeload Film Festival a year-round film festival for World Cinema. Later he founded Palador Pictures with Mohan Polamar, to bring the then almost non-prevalent World Cinema and foreign language films into India. The company is promoting them via DVD, Television and Theatrical Releases in the country.

Gautam has travelled extensively in India and abroad to popularize the concept of World cinema and has participated in a number of international film festivals.

Gautam is also a writer having written Meet Moriarty a collection of short stories in 2004 which was critically well received.

He is also a visiting faculty for technology in marketing and direct marketing at the NMIMS University.

== See also ==
- Palador Pictures
