= Majhli Didi =

- Directed by: Hrishikesh Mukherjee
- Screenplay by: Nabendu Ghosh
- Based on: Novel: Mejh Didi; Sarat Chandra Chattopadhyay
- Produced by: Kochi Sorkar; Gopal Mukherjee
- Starring: Meena Kumari; Dharmendra
- Cinematography: Jaywant Pathare
- Music by: Hemant Kumar; Lyrics: Gopaldas Neeraj
- Release date: 1967
- Country: India
- Language: Hindi

Majhli Didi is a 1967 Bollywood film directed by Hrishikesh Mukherjee, based on the Bengali language story, Mejdidi (Middle Sister) by Sarat Chandra Chattopadhyay, which was earlier filmed in Bengali in 1950 as Mejdidi. Majhli Didi stars Meena Kumari and Dharmendra.

Though the film didn't perform well at the Indian box office, it remains one of Hrishikesh Mukherjee's highly rated films. At the 16th Filmfare Awards, it won Best Screenplay Awards for Nabendu Ghosh and Best Art Direction, B&W for Ajit Banerjee. It was India's entry to the 41st Academy Awards for Best Foreign Language Film.

== Plot ==
Bipinchandra (Dharmendra) breaks family tradition by marrying a city girl, Hemangini (Meena Kumari), much to the chagrin of his sister-in-law, Kadambini (Lalita Pawar), and her husband, Navinchandra (Bipin Gupta). Things are delicate even after both women give birth to two children each. Then Hemangini testifies against Navinchandra in Court, leading to the division of the property. Things get worse by the arrival of Kadambini's orphaned school-going step-brother, Kishan (Sachin), who is beaten and abused not only by Kadambini and Navinchandra, but also by their overweight son. When Hemangini objects to Kishan's ill-treatment, Bipin takes the side of the rest of the family, and may probably force her to abandon Kishan to his fate or divorce her.

== Cast ==
- Meena Kumari as Hemangini 'Hema'
- Dharmendra as Bipinchandra 'Bipin'
- Sachin as Kishan
- Lalita Pawar as Kadambini
- Bipin Gupta as Navinchandra 'Navin'
- Leela Chitnis as Kishan's Mother
- Leela Mishra as Kishan's neighbor
- Asit Sen as Babunath, prosecuting lawyer
- Maruti
- Keshto Mukherjee as Bhola, Navin's employee
- Sarika as Uma, Hemangini's daughter
- Jalal Agha as Kamal

== Music ==
1. "Ma Hi Ganga Ma Hi Jamuna Ma Hi Teerth Dhaam" - Lata Mangeshkar
2. "Ma Hi Ganga Ma Hi Jamuna Ma Hi Teerth Dhaam v2" - Lata Mangeshkar, Kamal Barot
3. "Ma Hi Ganga Ma Hi Jamuna Ma Hi Teerth Dhaam v3" - Lata Mangeshkar
4. "Main Laal Laal Guchkoon" - Lata Mangeshkar, Kamal Barot and Neelima Chatterjee
5. "Nadiyon Ki Bhari Bhari God Jahaan" - Hemant Kumar
6. "Umariya Bin Khewat Ki Naiya" - Hemant Kumar

== See also ==
- List of submissions to the 41st Academy Awards for Best Foreign Language Film
- List of Indian submissions for the Academy Award for Best Foreign Language Film
