= Biraj Bahu =

- Directed by: Bimal Roy
- Written by: Saratchandra Chattopadhyay (novel); Nabendu Ghosh (adaptation); Nasir Hussain (dialogue); Bimal Roy (screenplay)
- Produced by: Hiten Choudhury
- Starring: Kamini Kaushal; Abhi Bhattacharya; Pran
- Cinematography: Dilip Gupta
- Edited by: Hrishikesh Mukherjee
- Music by: Salil Chowdhury
- Production company: Hiten Choudhury Productions
- Release date: 1954
- Country: India
- Language: Hindi

Biraj Bahu is a 1954 Hindi film produced by Hiten Choudhury and directed by Bimal Roy, and based on a Bengali novel by Saratchandra Chattopadhyay. The film stars Kamini Kaushal, Abhi Bhattacharya and Pran and has music by Salil Chowdhury. The film won the All India Certificate of Merit for Best Feature Film.

Madhubala, the highest-paid actress of that time, was eager to play the lead role in the film. She had visited Bimal Roy's office several times for this purpose. However, thinking that she would ask for high fee for doing the film, he cast Kamini Kaushal instead of her. Learning that her fee lost her the role, she had said that she would have acted for even one rupee in Biraj Bahu.

== Plot ==
Biraj (Kamini Kaushal) was married off to Nilambar Chakraborty (Abhi Bhattacharya) when she was a little girl. The couple is childless. Nilambar is pious, generous and loving, but unemployed. His devious younger brother takes advantage of Nilambar's naiveté to force a partition of the home and buy off their joint land under an assumed name from the lender it was mortgaged to. Nilambar and Biraj are reduced to a wretched existence. To make matters worse, Deodhar, a wealthy young contractor who arrives in the village, is captivated by Biraj's beauty and tries to bribe her erstwhile maid Sundari, to lure her to his boat. After several dramatic twists and turns, Biraj is kidnapped, but she jumps off the boat before he can do anything. She runs away from the hospital in the middle of the night to see her husband one last time. He had promised that he would bless her at the time of her death and that she would die at his feet.

== Cast ==
- Kamini Kaushal as Biraj Chakravorty
- Abhi Bhattacharya as Nilambar Chakravorty
- Shakuntala as Punnu Chakravorty
  - Baby Chand as Child Punnu
- Pran as Deodhar
- Randhir as Pitambar Chakravorty
- Manorama as Sundari (Maidservant)
- Iftekhar as Kishorilal, Deodhar's assistant
- Moni Chatterjee as Bholanath

== Music ==
The music for the film was composed by Salil Chowdhury, with lyrics written by Prem Dhawan

1. "Meraa Mann Bhula Bhula Kahe Dole" - Hemant Kumar
2. "Jhum Jhum Manmohan Re Murali" - Hemant Kumar
3. "Suno Seeta Ki Kahani Ke Wo Mahlo Ki Rani" - Mohammed Rafi
4. "Na Jane Re Na Jane Re, Saiya Man Ki Battiya" - Shamshad Begum
5. "Tera Ghar Aabad Rahe Ja Ri Dulhaniya Ja Jaha Rahe" - Shyamal Mitra, Lata Mangeshkar

== Awards ==
- 1954: National Film Awards for All India Certificate of Merit for Best Feature Film
- 1955: Filmfare Best Director Award for Bimal Roy
- 1955: Filmfare Best Actress Award for Kamini Kaushal
- 1955: Palme d'Or - Cannes Film Festival: Nominated.
