= Madhu Malti =

1978 film by Basu Bhattacharya

- Poster
- Directed by: Basu Bhattacharya
- Written by: Gyandev Agnihotri
- Produced by: Chitra Katha
- Starring: Sachin; Sarika; Nadira
- Edited by: Tanvir Ahmed
- Music by: Ravindra Jain
- Release date: 25 August 1978
- Country: India
- Language: Hindi

Madhu Malti (transl. Combretum indicum) is a coming-of-age 1978 Hindi film directed by Basu Bhattacharya. Produced by Chitra Katha, the film stars Sachin and Sarika in the title roles. This was Gulshan Grover's film debut. The film tells the love story of Madhu and Malti, two college students. The film was released on 25 August 1978 and was certified U by the Central Board of Film Certification.

== Plot ==
Madhu (Sachin) and Malti (Sarika) are college students, who are assigned by their professor, Anil Sharma, to play the title parts in a college play based on Romeo and Juliet. The two fall in love along the way but are forced to move to a big city to realise their love, as their traditional families oppose to their relationship. The later move to Goa, where a Goan couple looks after them, but soon decide to go back home and confront the situation.

== Cast ==
The film's cast included:

- Sachin as Madhu
- Sarika as Malti
- Nadira
- Gulshan Grover
- Dinesh Thakur
- Arvind Deshpande
- Manik Dutt
- Bharat Bhushan
- Sulabha Deshpande
- Parveen Paul
- Abha Dhulia
- Benjamin Gilani
- Prema Narayan
- Jayadev Hattangadi

== Soundtrack ==
The film's soundtrack was composed by Ravindra Jain, and the playback singers included Mukesh, Hemlata, Suresh Wadkar. Jain also sang one of the songs, for the first time in his career.

Song	Singer(s)
"Duniya Se Door Ek Nai Duniya "	Hemlata, Suresh Wadkar
"Sagar O More Sagar"	Ravindra Jain
"Bachpan Mohe Peechhe Bulaye "	Hemlata
"Jo Sirf Khushi Ka Mol Kare "	Mukesh
