= Basu Bhattacharya =

Indian film director

- Born: 1934; Calcutta, Bengal Presidency, British India
- Died: 19 June 1997 (aged 62–63); Mumbai, Maharashtra, India
- Spouse: Rinki Bhattacharya (m. 1961; div. 1990)
- Children: 3; including Aditya Bhattacharya
- Awards: 1972: National Film Award for Second Best Feature Film (Anubhav); 1985 Filmfare Best Movie Award (Sparsh)

Basu Bhattacharya (1934 – 19 June 1997) was an Indian film director of Hindi films. He is perhaps best known for his 1966 film Teesri Kasam, starring Raj Kapoor and Waheeda Rehman (based on the short story "Maare Gaye Gulfam" by Phanishwar Nath 'Renu'), which won the National Film Award for Best Feature Film in 1967. The most popular and critically acclaimed film which he directed remains Avishkaar, starring Rajesh Khanna and Sharmila Tagore, which received five stars in Bollywood Guide Collections and for which Khanna received the Filmfare Best Actor Award in 1975.

In 1979, he produced Sparsh, which won the National Film Award for Best Feature Film in Hindi and the film also won the Filmfare Best Movie Award. He served as president of the Indian Film Directors' Association from 1976 to 1979. In 1981 he was a member of the jury at the 12th Moscow International Film Festival. None of his works were successful after 1983.

He started his career in 1958 by assisting Bimal Roy in films like Madhumati and Sujata and later married Bimal Roy's daughter, Rinki Bhattacharya, much to Bimal Roy's disapproval. This created a rift between him and his mentor. The couple had a son, the director Aditya Bhattacharya, and two daughters: Chimmu and Anwesha Arya, a writer. Later after much domestic abuse, his wife Rinki moved out in 1983, and the couple formally divorced in 1990. Rinki went on to edit an anthology on domestic violence in India, titled, Behind Closed Doors – Domestic Violence in India and became a successful writer, columnist and documentary filmmaker.

== Early life ==
Basu Bhattacharya hailed from an orthodox Brahmin family from a small town, Cossimbazar, in West Bengal

== Filmography ==
=== As director ===
- Uski Kahani (1966)
- Teesri Kasam (1966) - Won National Film Award for Best Feature Film
- Anubhav (1971) - Won National Film Award for Second Best Feature Film
- Avishkaar (1973)
- Daku (1975)
- Tumhara Kalloo (1975)
- Sangat (1976)
- Known Yet Not Known (1977)
- Anand Mahal (1977)(Unreleased)
- Madhu Malti (1978)
- Griha Pravesh (1979)
- Madhuman (1981)
- Horký podzim s vuní manga (1984)
- Anveshan (1985) (TV)
- Solar Energy (1986)
- Science India (1986)
- Panchavati (1986)
- Ek Saas Zindagi (1991)
- Aastha: In the Prison of Spring (1997).
