= Teesri Kasam =

1966 film of Raj Kapoor

- Theatrical Poster
- Directed by: Basu Bhattacharya
- Screenplay by: Nabendu Ghosh; Phanishwar Nath Renu (Dialogue)
- Story by: Phanishwar Nath Renu
- Based on: Maare Gaye Gulfam by Phanishwar Nath Renu
- Produced by: Shailendra
- Starring: Raj Kapoor; Waheeda Rehman; Rehana
- Cinematography: Subrata Mitra
- Edited by: Iqbal
- Music by: Shankar-Jaikishen; Shailendra (Lyrics); Hasrat Jaipuri (Lyrics)
- Production company: Image Makers
- Release date: 1966
- Running time: 159 min
- Country: India
- Language: Hindi

Teesri Kasam (transl. The Third Vow) is a 1966 Hindi language drama film directed by Basu Bhattacharya and produced by lyricist Shailendra. It is based on the short story Mare Gaye Gulfam, by the Hindi novelist Phanishwarnath Renu. The film stars Raj Kapoor and Waheeda Rehman. The duo Shankar–Jaikishan composed the film's score. The film's cinematography was done by Subrata Mitra, dialogues were written by Phanishwarnath Renu and the screenplay is by Nabendu Ghosh.

== Synopsis ==
After nearly getting arrested, Hiraman promises to himself that he will never assist any black-marketeer nor transport bamboo. This incident does cost him his bullock-cart but he did manage to get his two oxen away in time. He manages to save enough money to buy another cart, and is hired to take a woman on a 30-hour ride to a Mela. He subsequently finds that his passenger is an attractive woman, Hira Bai, and he falls in love with her - little knowing that she is a traveling dancer - and it is this attraction that will get him into a physical altercation as well as in the bad books of Thakur Vikram Singh.

== Plot ==
Hiraman (Raj Kapoor) is a rustic villager, a bullock cart driver, from a remote village in Bihar. He takes two vows based on difficult situations in his life. He then meets and befriends Hirabai, a nautanki dancer. In the end, Hiraman takes a third vow.

Hiraman has traditional and conservative values. While smuggling illegal goods on his bullock cart and narrowly escaping the police, Hiraman takes a vow (pehli kasam) to never again carry illegal goods. Subsequently, while transporting bamboo for a timber trader, Hiraman's load upsets the horses of two men. The two men then beat up Hiraman. After this, Hiraman takes a second vow (doosri kasam) to never again carry bamboo in his cart.

One night, Hiraman is asked to carry Hirabai (Waheeda Rehman), a nautanki dancer, as a passenger to a village fair forty miles away. As they travel together, Hiraman sings to pass time and tells Hirabai the story of the legend of Mahua. As the journey progresses, Hirabai is mesmerized by Hiraman's innocence and his simple philosophy of life. Hiraman sees Hirabai as an angel of purity.

Once they reach the village fair, Hiraman joins his band of bullock cart drivers and Hirabai joins the nautanki company. Hirabai asks Hiraman to stay at the village fair for a few days to see her dance. Hirabai arranges free passes for Hiraman and his friends to see the nautanki every night for the duration of the fair.

As Hiraman attends the nautanki, he becomes aware that other people see Hirabai as a prostitute and this disturbs him. He tries to shield and protect her from society. As the days pass, the bond between Hirabai and Hiraman grows stronger. When Hiraman becomes involved in fights with local people who disparage Hirabai and her profession, Hirabai tries to make him understand that it is the harsh reality of her life. Hiraman asks Hirabai to leave her profession and to start living a respectable life. Hirabai refuses to leave. Feeling depressed, Hiraman leaves the village fair and returns to his village.

Hirabai meets Hiraman and tells him that she had been sold, then leaves. Hiraman then takes a third vow (teesri kasam) that he will never again carry a nautanki dancer in his cart.

== Cast ==
- Raj Kapoor as Meeta, Hiraman
- Waheeda Rehman as Hirabai
- Dulari as Hiraman's bhabhi (sister-in-law)
- Iftekhar as Thakur Vikram Singh
- Keshto Mukherji as Shivratan
- A.K. Hangal as Hiraman's older brother
- Asit Sen as mela announcer
- C. S. Dubey as Birju
- Harbans Papey as dancer in the second Parts of the song (Kissa Hota Hai Shuru Paaki Ishq Rangin)
- Shailendra
- Rehana
- Viswa Mehera as Palta (he was brother-in-law of Prithviraj Kapoor in real life)
- Ratan Gaurang as guards
- Pachhi as Nautanki owner
- Navendu Ghosh
- Shivaji Bhai
- Mansaram
- B. Periera

== Production ==
=== Development and Pre-production ===
Phanishwarnath Renu, who wrote the original short story Mare Gaye Gulfam in 1954, also wrote the script. The screenplay was written by Nabendu Ghosh, whose works include Devdas (1955), Sujata (1959) and Bandini (1963). Basu Bhattacharya directed the film with a sense of realism and natural style. He felt it was important for the film that Raj Kapoor should avoid his usual "simple man" mannerisms. Shailendra acquired Mare gaye gulfam rights, and initially Mehmood and Meena Kumari was selected for the role of Hiraman and Hirabai. Raj Kapoor charged only one rupee to make the film. He advised Shailendra to add some commercial elements in this film, in this heartbreaking sad story but the producer did not agree to it and did the movie the way he wanted.

Lata Mangeshkar, Manna Dey, Asha Bhosle, Suman Kalyanpur, Shankar- Shambhu, and Mukesh did playback singing.

=== Principal photography ===
Shailendra wanted to film this movie in the Terai area of Bihar, but the stories of dacoits and robbers there forced him to shoot this film somewhere else. The filming took place at Igatpuri near Nasik. The filming took many years to complete. Indoor filming took place at R.K. Studio, Shree Sound Studios and Kamal studio in Bombay (now Mumbai). Basu Bhattacharya wanted Raj and Waheeda Rehman perform in natural way. Raj Kapoor thought the ending of the film should be tweaked and Hirabai and Hiraman should go away together, but no one agreed to this. Most of the outdoor sequences were filmed at Aurahi Hingna, Araria district in Bihar and Bina, a town near Bhopal, Madhya Pradesh. A few scenes were filmed at Powai Lake and at Mohan Studios in Mumbai. A set of Gulababag fair's The Great Bharat nautanki (drama) company was created in Mumbai studio. Subrata Mitra, the cinematographer on Satyajit Ray's early films, had moved to Mumbai for a brief period to make Merchant Ivory films. The theatre actor A. K. Hangal, knew Shailender from IPTA theatre group days, and agreed to play the small role of Hiraman's elder brother. However, eventually much of his role was cut in the final editing to reduce the length of the film.

Lachchu Maharaj and Rama Devi did this film's choreography and Nautanki was supervised by Shankar-Shambhu while Desh Mukharjee was the art director.

=== Crew ===
- Basu Bhattacharya - Director
- Shailendra - Producer
- Phanishwar Nath Renu - Story and Dialogue
- Nabendu Ghosh - Screenplay
- G. G. Mayekar - Editor
- Subrata Mitra - Cinematographer
- Desh Mukherjee - Art Director
- Pandit Shivram - Costume
- Lachhu Maharaj - Choreographer
- Shankar Jaikishan - Composer
- Hasrat Jaipuri, Shailendra - Lyricist
- Asha Bhosle, Manna Dey, Suman Kalyanpur, Lata Mangeshkar, Mubarak Begum, Mukesh, Shambhu-Shankar (qawwal) - Playback Singers.

== Music ==
All lyrics are written by Shailendra & Hasrat Jaipuri; all music is composed by Shankar–Jaikishan.

No.	Title	Lyrics	Singer(s)	Length
1.	"Aa Aa Bhi Jaa"	Shailendra	Lata Mangeshkar	5:03
2.	"Chalat Musafir"	Shailendra	Manna Dey	3:04
3.	"Duniya Bananewale"	Hasrat Jaipuri	Mukesh	5:03
4.	"Haye Ghazab Kahin Tara Toota"	Shailendra	Asha Bhosle	4:13
5.	"Maare Gaye Gulfaam"	Hasrat Jaipuri	Lata Mangeshkar	4:00
6.	"Paan Khaaye Saiyaan Hamaaro" (Raga Yaman Kalyan)	Shailendra	Asha Bhosle	4:08
7.	"Sajanwa Bairi Ho Gaye Hamaar"	Shailendra	Mukesh	3:51
8.	"Sajan Re Jhoot Mat Bolo"	Shailendra	Mukesh	3:43
9.	"Lali Lali Doliya Mein Lali Re"	Shailendra	Asha Bhosle	3:11
10.	"Kissa Hota Hai Shuru"	Shailendra	Mubarak Begum, Shankar-Shambhu	2:57
11.	"Preet Bana ke Tune"	Hasrat Jaipuri	Suman Kalyanpur	1:00

== Reception ==
Teesri Kasam was well received by critics and won the National Film Award for Best Feature Film; however, it proved to be a commercial failure at the box-office. Bhattacharya turned to middle cinema (a meeting of mainstream Bollywood and art house cinema). Over the years, the film came to be regarded as a classic.

Raj Kapoor himself did not like this film and criticised the film's director, Basu Bhattacharya; in an interview in 1977 with India Today he said, "Basu (Basu Bhattacharya) is a pseudo, and I didn't like the film. He was risking somebody else's money. What did he have to lose?"

Both Kapoor and Rehman received acclaim for their performances in the film, and critics felt that Raj Kapoor delivered one of the most sensitive performances of his career. (1956).

== Legacy ==
A chapter titled 'Teesri Kasam Ke Shilpkar Shailendra' (lit. "The Architect of Teesri Kasam Shailendra") (Devnagari: तीसरी कसम के शिल्पकार शैलेंद्र) which is based on the film, is included in CBSE class 10 Hindi Course-B Textbook Sparsh (Bhag 2) ("Touch (Part 2)") (Devnagari : स्पर्श (भाग – 2)). After being excluded for several years, this chapter was recently brought back in course.

== Awards and nominations ==
Year	Award	Category	Nominee(s)	Result
1967	National Film Awards	Best Feature Film	Shailendra and Basu Bhattacharya	Won
1967	Filmfare Awards	Best Lyricist	Shailendra (for Sajan Re Jhoot Mat Bolo)	Nominated
1967	Moscow International Film Festival	Grand Prix	Basu Bhattacharya	Nominated
1967	Bengal Film Journalists' Association Awards (Hindi)	Best Director	Basu Bhattacharya	Won
1967	Bengal Film Journalists' Association Awards (Hindi)	Best Actor	Raj Kapoor	Won
1967	Bengal Film Journalists' Association Awards (Hindi)	Best Actress	Waheeda Rehman	Won

== Bibliography ==
- Kaur, Raminder; Sinha, Ajay J (2005). Bollyworld: Popular Indian Cinema Through A Transnational Lens. SAGE Publications. ISBN 978-0-7619-3321-2.
- Hangal, A. K. (1999). Life and Times of A.K. Hangal. Sterling Publishers. ISBN 978-81-207-2163-0.
- Gulazāra; Nihalani, Govind; Chatterjee, Saibal (2003). Encyclopaedia of Hindi Cinema. Popular Prakashan. ISBN 978-81-7991-066-5.
- Singh, Indubala (2007). Gender Relations and Cultural Ideology in Indian Cinema: A Study of Select Adaptations of Literary Texts. Deep & Deep Publications. ISBN 978-81-7629-989-3.
- Banerjee, Shampa; Srivastava, Anil (1988). One Hundred Indian Feature Films: An Annotated Filmography. Taylor & Francis. ISBN 978-0-8240-9483-6.
- Patel, Bhaichand (2012). Bollywood's Top 20: Superstars of Indian Cinema. Penguin Books India. ISBN 978-0-670-08572-9.
- Kabir, Nasreen Munni; Rehman, Waheeda (2014). Conversations with Waheeda Rehman. Penguin Books Limited. ISBN 978-93-5118-642-7.
- Mare Gaye Gulfam by Phanishwarnath Renu, Original Story in Hindi, 1954.
