= Aditya Bhattacharya =

Indian film director and screenwriter

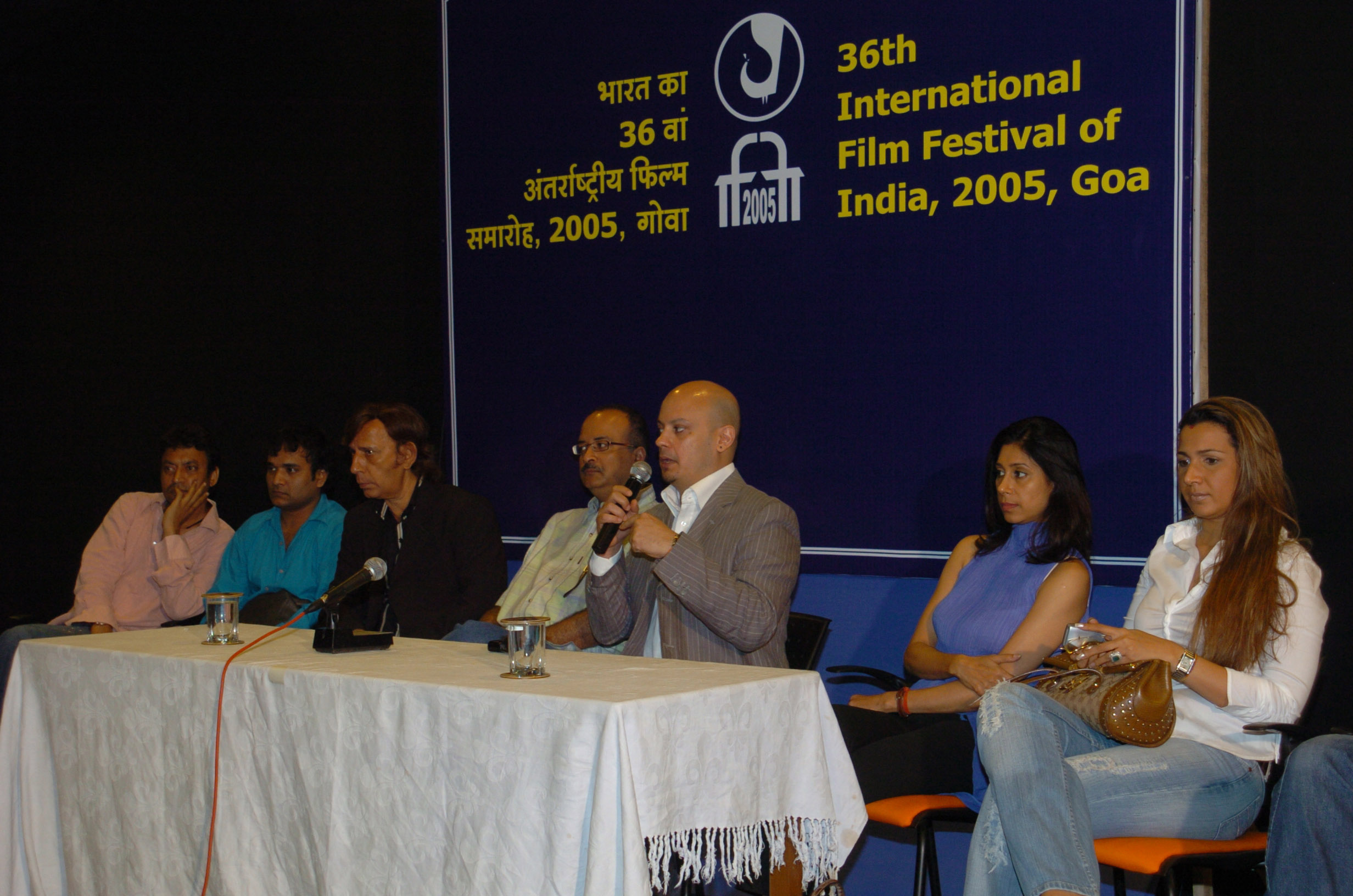
- Aditya Bhattacharya (right), IFFI (2005)
- Born: 1965 (age 60–61); Calcutta, West Bengal, India
- Occupations: film director, screenwriter
- Years active: 1983–present
- Spouses: Sanjana Kapoor (divorced); Maria Giovanna-(previously in relationship,separated), Following with another lady in Barcelona (name unknown), was in relationship, now separated
- Parents: Basu Bhattacharya (father); Rinki Bhattacharya (mother)

Aditya Bhattacharya (born 1965) is an Indian film director and screenwriter, most known for his feature film, Raakh (1989), starring Aamir Khan and Pankaj Kapur, which garnered three National Film Awards.

He is the son of film director Basu Bhattacharya and Rinki Bhattacharya, the daughter of Bimal Roy.

== Early life ==
He was born in a Bengali family of film director Basu Bhattacharya and Rinki Bhattacharya, who is the daughter of noted filmmaker Bimal Roy and herself a columnist and documentary filmmaker.

== Career ==
He started his film career as an actor in Shyam Benegal's Mandi (1983), where he played the role of Smita Patil's boyfriend. He followed it up Rihaee (1988) and Sudhir Mishra's Hazaaron Khwaishein Aisi (2003). He made his debut as director with Raakh (1989), which starred Aamir Khan, his second after his debut with Ketan Mehta's Holi (1984), though it was released only after his blockbuster QSQT (1989); the film did not do well at the box office; however, it went on to receive three National Film Awards, and a Best Directorial Debut Award at the Bengal Film Journalists' Association Awards.

Meanwhile, he also worked as a photo journalist. Subsequently, he shifted base in 1988 from Mumbai to Rome, where he made an Italian film, some music videos, etc.

His film Dubai Return (2005), which he also produced under the banner Aditya Pictures, starred Irrfan Khan and Divya Dutta, which premiered at IFFI Goa 2005.

In 2012, he produced and directed Bombay's Most Wanted (BMW), a film on encounter specialist played by Javed Jaffrey. BMW was screened at the Mumbai Film Festival, organised by MAMI.

== Personal life ==
He was in a relationship with actress and theatre person Sanjana Kapoor for many years, whom he had met during the theatre days at Prithvi Theatre, and later married, but the marriage did not last. He was then in a relationship with an Italian woman Maria Giovanna - separated, following with a lady in Barcelona, also separated; currently he lives in Barcelona, and divides his time between Barcelona and Mumbai.

== Filmography ==
Director

- Raakh (1989)
- Senso Unico (1999)
- Dubai Return (2005)
- Sandokan in Sicilia (2009)
- BMW - Bombay's Most Wanted (2012)

Actor

- Mandi (1983)
- Rihaee (1988)
- Hazaaron Khwaishein Aisi (2003)
- Black Friday (2004)
- Tera Kya Hoga Johnny (2008)
