= Dui Bigha Jomi =

Poem by Rabindranath Tagore

- by Rabindranath Tagore
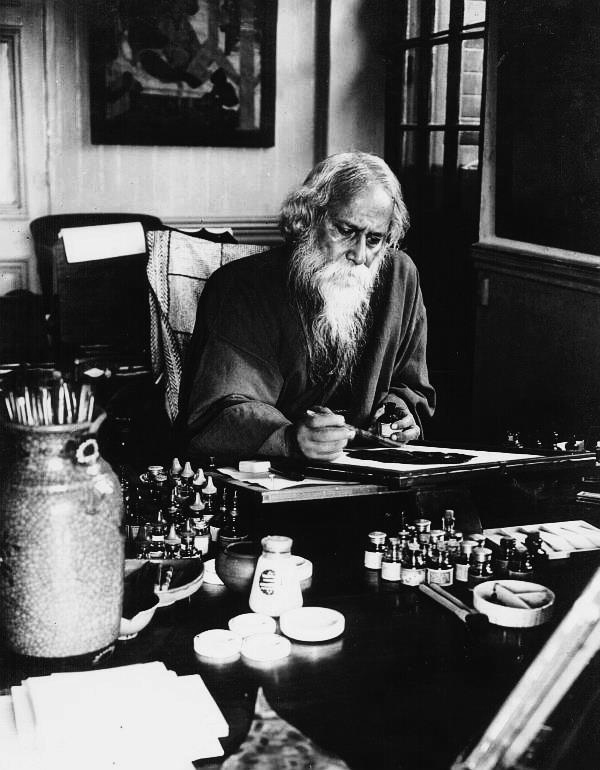
- Original title: দুই বিঘা জমি
- Country: India
- Language: Bengali

"Dui Bigha Jomi" (IPA: [d̪ui bigʱɑ d͡ʒomi], transl. Two bighas of land) is a Bengali language poem written by Rabindranath Tagore. The poem describes a peasant's love towards his land and was the inspiration for the story Rickshawala, on which the Hindi film Do Bigha Zamin, directed by Bimal Roy, was based.

== Synopsis ==
The poem is written in the first-person narrative, from the perspective of a peasant called "Upen". He was a poor man with nothing other than "Dui Bigha Jomi", two bighas of ancestral land. The rich landlord (zamindar) of his village conspired against Upen, filed a false lawsuit against him and evicted him from his land. Being unable to prevail against the powerful zamindar, Upen left his village, became a disciple of a holyman (sannyasi), and began travelling to different places as a homeless person. Several years passed and Upen ultimately returned to his homeland. On entering the village, he experienced strong emotions. He sat beside a mango tree and recalled how he uses to play around the tree during his childhood. Suddenly two mangoes fell from the tree. Upen considered this as a gift to him from the tree, but just then, the zamindar's gardener came on the scene, and without recognising Upen, the real owner of the land, accused him of stealing fruits and took him to the zamindar. The zamindar also failed to identify Upen, and with his friends insulted him and called him a thief.

== Influence ==
The title of Tagore's poem and the story (Rickshawala) by music director Salil Chowdhury, inspired Do Bigha Zamin (1953), a Hindi-language film directed by Bimal Roy; it was noted as one of the "most memorable films of post-colonial India". The poem has been referred in numerous books and stories including Bibhutibhushan Bandyopadhyay's Dui Bari.
