= Rinki Bhattacharya =

Indian writer, columnist and documentary filmmaker

Rinki Roy Bhattacharya
- Born: Rinki Roy; 1942 (age 83–84); Kolkata, India
- Occupations: Writer, columnist, documentary filmmaker
- Spouse: Basu Bhattacharya (m. 1961; div. 1990)
- Children: 3, including Aditya Bhattacharya
- Father: Bimal Roy

Rinki Roy Bhattacharya (born 1942) is an Indian writer, columnist and documentary filmmaker. Daughter of film director Bimal Roy, she was married to Basu Bhattacharya and collaborated on his films. She is the vice-chairperson of the Children's Film Society of India (CFSI) and the founder chairperson of Bimal Roy Memorial & Film Society. As a freelance journalist, she has been writing extensively on films, theatre, art and feminist issues, for publications of The Times Group, The Telegraph, The Hindu and The Indian Express .

== Biography ==
A Kolkata native, Rinki was born in 1942. She was the eldest daughter of the renowned Indian filmmaker, Bimal Roy. Her childhood was spent around prominent writers, poets and artists, who frequented their household, which was also noted for its gourmet Bengali cuisine.

She began her career as a freelance journalist in 1966 and had articles published in The Economic Times, The Indian Express and many other periodicals. In spite of the fact that she grew up in the company of writers in Bengali and that her father made films in Hindi, she chose to write in English, a colonial language, and began her career writing in the economic times and the times of India. She made her debut into making documentary films with Char Divari, a documentary which deals with wife-beating, which was followed soon after by a sequel on related issues involving violence against women in India.

She became deeply involved in the Women's Movement in India and has written several books on the subject, including Behind Closed Doors: Domestic Violence In India, Bimal Roy - A Man of Silence, Indelible Imprints, an essay in Uncertain Liaisons as well as several cookbooks. She also published a book on the making of the film, Madhumati (1958), Bimal Roy's Madhumati: Untold Stories from Behind the Scenes (2014).

== Personal life ==
In 1961, Rinki married film director Basu Bhattacharya (1934–1997). The couple had three children: a son Aditya Bhattacharya (b. 1965), who is a film director, and two daughters, Chimmu Acharya and Anwesha Arya, the latter a writer.

Chimmu Acharya is married to Sumit Acharya, a Dubai-based corporate executive. Their daughter, Drisha, is married to Karan Deol, son of Sunny Deol and grandson of Dharmendra.

In a 1984 interview with journalist Madhu Kishwar for the publication Manushi, Rinki revealed that she had left her husband in 1982 and alleged that she had suffered domestic abuse. The couple were formally divorced in 1990. Rinki has also had a history of discord with her mother and siblings. Following the death of her father in 1966, Rinki disputed over property with her mother and siblings, filing cases in court against them on the basis of legal technicalities. Her family reached a settlement with her in preference to spending years in litigation, and Rinki thus received an enhanced share of her father's property.

Rinki lives in Bandra, Mumbai.

== Bibliography ==
- Cuisine Creations from Bengal, 1993, India Book House Pvt. Ltd., ISBN 81-85028-76-1.
- Bimal Roy: A Man of Silence, 1994, South Asia Books, ISBN 81-7223-154-7.
- Behind Closed Doors: Domestic Violence in India. 2004, Sage Publications Pvt. Ltd. ISBN 0-7619-3238-0.
- Bengal Spices, 2004, Rupa & Co., ISBN 81-291-0473-3.
- Janani - Mothers, Daughters, Motherhood, 2006, Sage Publications Pvt. Ltd, ISBN 0-7619-3510-X.
- Bimal Roy's Madhumati: Untold Stories from Behind the Scenes, 2014. Rupa Publications. ISBN 8129129167.
