= Kayahiner Kahini =

1973 Bengali supernatural horror film by Ajoy Kar

- Directed by: Ajoy Kar
- Based on: Asharirini by Nabendu Ghosh
- Screenplay by: Ajoy Kar; Salil Sen
- Story by: Nabendu Ghosh
- Produced by: Mukul Roy
- Starring: Uttam Kumar; Aparna Sen; Tarun Kumar; Bikash Roy; Sulata Chowdhury
- Cinematography: Bishu Chakraborty
- Edited by: Dulal Dutta
- Music by: Mukul Roy
- Production company: Mukul Roy Productions
- Release date: 13 April 1973
- Running time: 114 minutes
- Country: India
- Language: Bengali

Kayahiner Kahini (transl. The Tale of an Incorporeal) is a 1973 Indian Bengali-language supernatural psychological horror film co-written and directed by Ajoy Kar. Produced by Mukul Roy under the banner of Mukul Roy Productions, the film stars Uttam Kumar in dual roles, alongside an ensemble cast of Aparna Sen, Bikash Roy, Pahari Sanyal, Tarun Kumar and Basabi Nandi.

Based on Nabendu ghosh's short story Asharirini, the film depicts on a writer who gets trapped into a mysterious situation regarding supernatural events due to his resemblance to a wealthy businessman.

The film marks the eight collaboration between Kar and Kumar, and also pairs Kumar and Sen for the eighth time. Music of the film is composed by Mukul Roy, with lyrics penned by Gauriprasanna Mazumder. Bishu Chakraborty handled its cinematography, while Dulal Dutta edited the film.

Kayahiner Kahini was theatrically released on 13 April 1973, on the occasion of Pohela Baishakh. Despite its positive reviews, it underperformed at the box office. In the film, Kumar's character was slow-paced and normal, and his performance was influenced by David Manners in The Black Cat (1934), which was perceived as the main reason for the box-office failure, as the audience was unwelcoming of Kumar losing one of his typical traits. However, it gained cult status over time and has since been re-evaluated for its stylized direction, intense performances, and cinematography. Apart from it, Kayahiner Kahini is included in one of Kar's best works.

== Plot ==
Kayahiner Kahini follows writer Santanu Roy, who becomes entangled in a web of psychological and supernatural events after encountering Mallika, a mysterious woman with a tragic past. As Santanu investigates her story, he begins to lose grip on reality, confronting questions about identity, memory, and the nature of the incorporeal.

== Cast ==
- Uttam Kumar in dual roles
  - Santanu Roy, a writer
  - Prabir Majumder
- Aparna Sen as Mallika
- Tarun Kumar as Nibaran, Santanu's friend
- Bikash Roy as Dr. B. K. Roy Chowdhury, a psychiatrist
- Pahari Sanyal as Mallika's father
- Basabi Nandi as Roma, Prabir's wife
- Chandrabati Devi as Prabir's mother
- Sulata Chowdhury as Kanchi
- Amarnath Mukherjee as Prabir's cousin
- Dilip Basu as Bhagwa
- Kshitish Acharya as Khokon, Prabir's cousin
- Ashok Mitra as Inspector
- Ajoy Banerjee as the owner of the tailor shop
- Bimal Banerjee as Neetu, Prabir's uncle
- Babu Bose
- Khagesh Chakraborty
- Ranju Bose
- Rabin Chatterjee
- Surya Chatterjee
- Ajit Roy
- Indira Roy

== Music ==
Music of the film is composed by Mukul Roy, with lyrics penned by Gauriprasanna Mazumder.

Track listing
No.	Title	Singer(s)	Length
1.	"Shuru Na Hotei Keno"	Asha Bhosle	3:18
2.	"Ami Je Tomar Asha"	Subir Sen, Asha Bhosle	3:17
3.	"Na Hotei Keno Swapno Sesh"	Asha Bhosle	3:17
Total length:			9:52
