= Byomkesh Bakshi =

Fictional detective in Bengali literature

Satyanweshi Byomkesh Bakshi
- Byomkesh character
- First appearance: Pather Kanta (1932)
- Last appearance: Bishupal Bodh (1970)
- Created by: Sharadindu Bandyopadhyay
- Portrayed by: Uttam Kumar; Shymal Ghosal; Ajoy Ganguly; Rajit Kapur; Sudip Mukherjee; Aneesh See Yay; Saptarshi Roy; Gaurav Chakrabarty; Abir Chatterjee; Jisshu Sengupta; Anirban Bhattacharya; Parambrata Chatterjee; Sujoy Ghosh; Subhrajit Dutta; Dhritiman Chatterjee; Sushant Singh Rajput; Dev; Soumitra Chatterjee

In-universe information
- Full name: Byomkesh Bakshi
- Title: Satyanweshi
- Occupation: Private investigator
- Spouse: Satyabati (Wife)
- Children: Khoka (Son)
- Religion: Hinduism
- Home: Harrison Road
- Nationality: Indian
- Friend: Ajit Kumar Bandopadhyay
- Height: 6 ft 1 in (1.85 m).

Byomkesh Bakshi is a fictional detective created by Bengali author Sharadindu Bandyopadhyay. A self-proclaimed "satyanweshi" (literally seeker of truth), Bakshi is known for his keen observation, logical thinking and knowledge of forensic science, which he uses to solve complex murder cases, mostly set in Calcutta.

His first appearance was in the story Pother Kanta (1932), where he demonstrates his deductive skills, but his formal introduction occurs in Satyanweshi (1934), a murder mystery involving cocaine trafficking. Byomkesh adopts the alias Atul Chandra Mitra in this story, where he meets Ajit Bandyopadhyay, who becomes his close companion and the narrator of the Byomkesh stories.

The character's name has since become synonymous with intelligence and keen observation in Bengali vernacular. The Byomkesh Bakshi stories have been adapted into various media, including films, television series, and audio dramas. Notable portrayals of the detective include those by Uttam Kumar, Rajit Kapur, and Abir Chatterjee. The stories continue to have a significant influence on Indian detective fiction, contributing to the development of the genre.

== Character ==
Sharadindu Bandyopadhyay's most well known fictional character Byomkesh Bakshi first appeared as a character in the story Satyanweshi (The Inquisitor). The story is set in 1932 in the Chinabazar area of then-Calcutta where a 'non-government detective' Byomkesh Bakshi, owing to the permission from the police commissioner, starts living in a mess in that area under the pseudonym of Atul Chandra Mitra to probe a series of murders.

Most of the stories are written from Ajit Kumar Banerjee's perspective, who meets Byomkesh in the mess at Chinabazar. Byomkesh later asks Ajit to live with him at his three-story rented house on Harrison Road as his assistant and chronicler. The only other person in his household is his attendant Putiram.

In the beginning of the stories, Byomkesh Bakshi is described as "a man of twenty-three or twenty-four years of age who looked well educated." Byomkesh is a Hindu and wears mostly a white shirt/kurta with a white dhoti, occasionally draping a shawl. He does not live in luxury but possesses numerous books. He travels frequently, and does not own a gun and does not consider himself to be an "expensive helper". He habitually smokes and drinks tea with milk. He is fluent in Bengali, Hindi, and English. Byomkesh does not like being called a detective, and thinks the word 'investigator' even worse. Thus, he fashions a new name for himself which he inscribes on a brass plate in front of his house. The plaque read "Byomkesh Bakshi: Satyanweshi" (The Inquisitor).

=== Family ===
Unlike other lead characters in similar detective fictional stories, Byomkesh Bakshi marries, ages, and also contemplates material things such as buying a car. Later, he also decides to buy land in Keyatala in South Kolkata and shifts to his new home. Byomkesh meets Satyabati, his future wife and the accused Sukumar's sister, in 'Arthamanartham'. The story 'Adim Ripu' provides some information about Byomkesh's early childhood. His father Mahadev Bakshi was a mathematics teacher at a school and practised Sankhya philosophy at home while his mother was the daughter of a Vaishnavite. When Byomkesh was seventeen years old, his parents died of tuberculosis. Later, Byomkesh passed university with a scholarship. During the Second World War and after India's independence, Byomkesh, Satyabati and Ajit live in the mess house of Harrison Road (Currently Mahatma Gandhi Road (Kolkata)). Byomkesh gradually ages through the series, and has a son called Khoka (Little Boy) in the series.

== The Byomkesh Bakshi anthology ==
From 1932 until his death in 1970, Saradindu Bandopadhyay wrote 32 Byomkesh Bakshi stories. Initially, Byomkesh's close friend and chronicler, Ajit Kumar Banerjee, serves as both companion and occasional investigator in Byomkesh's absence, as seen in stories like Makorshar Rosh and Shoilo Rahasya. While early tales use traditional Bengali, the language transitions to a more conversational style in later works. Notably, in later stories such as Room Nombor Dui, Chhlonar Chhondo, Shajarur Kanta, Benisonghaar, and Lohar Biskut, Ajit is absent as he focuses on his publication business.

The stories vary widely in their depiction of crime—from complex drug networks, as in Satyanweshi, to domestic mysteries like Arthamanartham and Makorshar Rosh. Though Bandopadhyay ceased writing Byomkesh stories between 1938 and 1951 while working in Bombay's film industry, public demand led him to resume with Chitrachor (Picture Imperfect) in 1951. His last story, Bishupal Badh (The Killing of Bishupal), was left incomplete upon his passing in 1970.

== List of stories ==
Novel/story	Year of publication
Satyanweshi	1932
Pother Kanta	1932
Seemanto-heera	1932
Makorshar Rosh	1933
Arthamanartham	1933
Chorabali	1933
Agniban	1935
Uposonghaar	1935
Raktomukhi Neela	1936
Byomkesh O Boroda	1936
Chitrochor	1951
Durgo Rahasya	1952
Chiriyakhana	1953
Adim Ripu	1955
Banhi-patanga	1956
Rokter Daag	1956
Monimondon	1958
Amriter Mrityu	1959
Shailo Rahasya	1959
Achin Pakhi	1960
Kohen Kobi Kalidas	1961
Adrishyo Trikon	1961
Khuji Khuji Nari	1961
Adwitiyo	1961
Mognomoinak	1963
Dushtochokro	1963
Henyalir Chhondo	1964
Room Nombor Dui	1964
Cholonar Chhondo	1965
Shajarur Kanta	1967
Benishonghar	1968
Lohar Biskut	1969
Bishupal Bodh (unfinished)	1970

== In media ==
The stories have been adapted into several television series, radio programs, audio dramas, films, and video games.

Chiriyakhana (1967) is an Indian Bengali-language crime thriller film based on the story of the same name, directed by Satyajit Ray and written by Bandyopadhyay and Ray, it starred Uttam Kumar as Byomkesh Bakshi.

The 1993–97 Byomkesh Bakshi television series, created by Basu Chatterjee, and starring Rajit Kapur as Byomkesh Bakshi, and K.K. Raina as Ajit respectively, became one of the most critically acclaimed and celebrated adaptation of the character. These television series are cast by Doordarshan.

There have been 20 Byomkesh Bakshi films, with Abir Chatterjee portraying the detective in seven of them.

The Satyanweshi audio drama series, created by actor Aneesh See Yay, adapted twenty-two Byomkesh Bakshi novels and produced eight original audio dramas in Malayalam.

In 2014, Colors Bangla aired a TV series titled Byomkesh, starring Gaurav Chakrabarty as Byomkesh and Ridhima Ghosh as Satyabati. Produced by Dag Creative Media, the series was well received by audiences.

In 2015, the Bollywood film Detective Byomkesh Bakshy! featured Sushant Singh Rajput as the lead, bringing Byomkesh to a national audience.

Byomkesh was also referenced in The Big Bang Theory Season 7, Episode 18, where Sherlock Holmes is humorously dubbed the "English Byomkesh Bakshi."

Anupam Roy refers to Byomkesh Bakshi in his song "Kolkata", for the Bengali film Praktan.

Radio Mirchi’s Sunday Suspense has adapted several Byomkesh stories, with RJ Mir initially voicing Byomkesh, later replaced by Gaurav Chakrabarty following Mir's departure and RJ Shekhar replaced RJ Deep as Ajit after Deep left Mirchi.

== See also ==
- Feluda
- Sherlock Holmes
- Parashor Barma
- Kiriti Roy
- Roy, Pinaki. The Manichean Investigators: A Postcolonial and Cultural Rereading of the Sherlock Holmes and Byomkesh Bakshi Stories. New Delhi: Sarup and Sons, 2008.
