= Do Bigha Zamin =

1953 film directed by Bimal Roy

- Film poster
- Directed by: Bimal Roy
- Written by: Paul Mahendra
- Screenplay by: Hrishikesh Mukherjee
- Story by: Salil Chowdhury
- Based on: "Dui Bigha Jomi" by: Rabindranath Tagore; "Rickshawalla"; by Salil Chowdhury
- Produced by: Bimal Roy
- Starring: Balraj Sahni; Nirupa Roy; Meena Kumari
- Cinematography: Kamal Bose
- Edited by: Hrishikesh Mukherjee
- Music by: Salil Chowdhury
- Production company: Bimal Roy Productions
- Distributed by: Bimal Roy Productions
- Release date: 16 January 1953
- Running time: 120 minutes
- Country: India
- Language: Hindi
- Box office: ₹70 lakh (equivalent to ₹81 crore or US$8.6 million in 2026)

Do Bigha Zamin (/ðoʊ biːˈɡɑː zəmiːn/ transl. Two bighas of land) (Note: A bigha is a traditional unit of measurement of area of a land in India, but is not the same as an acre. There is no standard size of bigha. The size of a bigha varies considerably from place to place.) is a 1953 Indian Hindi-language drama film directed by Bimal Roy. Based on Rabindranath Tagore's Bengali poem "Dui Bigha Jomi" and Rickshawalla, a short story written by composer Salil Chowdhury, the film stars Balraj Sahni and Nirupa Roy in lead roles. Known for its socialist theme, Do Bigha Zamin is considered an important film in the early parallel cinema of India, and a trend setter.

Inspired by Italian neo-realistic cinema, Bimal Roy made Do Bigha Zamin after watching Vittorio De Sica's Bicycle Thieves (1948). Like most of Bimal Roy's movies, art and commercial cinema merged to create a movie that is still viewed as a benchmark. It paved the way for future cinema makers in the Indian neo-realist movement and the Indian New Wave, which began in the 1950s.

A moderate commercial success, it was awarded the All India Certificate of Merit for Best Feature Film, it became the first film to win the Filmfare Best Movie Award and the first Indian film to win the International Prize at the Cannes Film Festival, after Neecha Nagar (1946), which won the Palme d'Or (Grand Prize). It was also winner of the Social Progress Award at the Karlovy Vary International Film Festival. In 2005, Indiatimes Movies ranked the movie amongst the Top 25 Must See Bollywood Films. The film was also released in China and in USSR.

The film also marks Meena Kumari's maiden guest appearance in her 33-year-long career. The lullaby, "Aa Jaa Ri Aa" is picturised on her.

== Plot ==
The story revolves around a farmer, Shambhu Maheto, who lives with his wife Parvati, son Kanhaiya and father Gangu in a small village that is hit by drought. After years of drought and famine, the region finally gets rain, leading the farmers to rejoice. Shambhu owns two bighas of land (a bigha being the equivalent of two-thirds of an acre of land), which is the only means of livelihood for the whole family. The local landlord Thakur Harnam Singh partners with some businessmen to construct a mill on his large parcel of land, which in return, he opines, would bring them profit and prosperity to the village. The only problem is that in the middle of Harnam Singh's land lies Shambhu's meager two bighas of land.

Harnam Singh is very confident that he can buy Shambhu's land. Shambhu has borrowed money from Harnam Singh several times in the past and has not paid off his debt. Harnam Singh calls for Shambhu and proposes to Shambhu to sell his land to him in exchange for his debt. Shambhu disagrees to sell his only means of livelihood. Angered by the refusal, Harnam Singh orders him to repay his debt by the next day or risk the auctioning of his land.

Shambhu returns home to discuss the issue with his father; father and son figure that the debt amounts to Rs. 65/-. Shambu wants to save his land by all means and sells all his household items, including his wife's gold earrings. When Shambhu meets Harnam Singh's accountant to pay back his debt of Rs. 65/-, he is shocked to know that he actually owes Rs. 235/-. The accountant had fudged the accounts and now refuses to consider the labor provided by Shambhu's father Gangu as a portion of the debt payoff. The case goes to court and Shambhu, being illiterate, has a tough time explaining to the judge how the accountant fudged the numbers and how he took the accountant's word and did not demand any receipt. Shambhu loses the case and the judge orders Shambu to pay Rs. 235/- to Harnam Singh in 3 months. If Shambhu is not able to clear the debt, then his land would be auctioned off and the proceeds would go to pay off his debts.

Shambhu now struggles to get the money. He is unable to get a loan because he has no collateral. One of his friends gives him an idea to go to Calcutta (now Kolkata) and try to get a job to earn enough money to pay off his debt. Shambhu likes this idea but faces resistance from his wife as she is pregnant and does not want to live away from him. Shambhu persuades her that he'll be gone for only 3 months and it would benefit his family and the soon-to-be-born baby. Kanhaiya wants to join his father too, but Shambhu refuses and scolds him. On the train to Calcutta, Shambhu finds Kanhaiya hiding in it, hitchhiking or as a stowaway, and after a brief confrontation agrees to take Kanhaiya with him.

In Calcutta, Shambhu and Kanhaiya have a harsh welcome. Nobody is willing to talk with them, let alone help them. Kanhaiya befriends a street-side shoe-shiner named Lalu Ustad. They even lose their last possessions while they are asleep on the footpath. Kanhaiya falls ill and Shambhu ends up renting a small room in the slums with the help of a tea vendor and the landlady's adopted grandchild, Rani. To pay the rent, Shambhu works as a coolie. Shambhu befriends an old Rickshaw Puller, who helps him get a license as a Rickshaw Puller. Kanhaiya tries to help his family by taking up shoe-shining with the help of the old Rickshaw Puller and Lalu. Back in the village, Parvati and Gangu survive on eating water chestnuts picked from the local river. She seeks help from Thakurain to write letters to Shambhu and stay in touch.

Near the end of the third month, Shambhu becomes desperate about earning and saving money. One day, a man asks Shambhu to chase another rickshaw that is carrying his girlfriend. Shambhu is asked to pull the rickshaw very fast for more money. The rickshaw loses a wheel and Shambhu meets with an accident. Looking at the condition of his father, Kanhaiya joins a pickpocket to earn quick money. Shambhu gets angry upon learning this and beats Kanhaiya. Meanwhile, Parvati gets worried since she receives no letters or money from Shambhu and the landlord's accountant accuses Shambhu of forgetting his family. She ends up working at a local construction site and is devastated when she receives news of Shambhu's accident. Finally, Parvati decides to visit Shambhu in the city even though Gangu is bedridden and has a high fever.

Parvati arrives in Calcutta and is taken in by a strange man, who claims he knows Shambhu and will take her to him. He takes her to his shed and tries to steal her belongings and rape her. She flees from him but gets hit by a car. A crowd gathers around her and they call for a rickshaw to take her to the hospital. Shambhu, who is passing by, offers a ride and is shocked to see that it is his own wife injured. Meanwhile, Kanhaiya, unable to withstand his father's condition, steals money from a lady and runs back to the slum. He learns of his mother's condition and rushes to the hospital. He cries after seeing his injured mother and claims that God has punished them because he stole money. He rips the money into pieces. The doctors tell Shambhu that he has to spend money on medicine and blood to save his wife. Poor Shambhu has no choice but to spend all his earnings to save his wife.

Back in the village, the land is auctioned because Shambhu could not pay back the debt and Gangu becomes insane. The land, now owned by Harman Singh, sees the beginning of mill construction. Shambhu and his family return to the village, only to see their land sold and a factory being constructed on it. He then tries to get a handful of dirt from his land but is stopped by a security guard. The film ends as Shambhu and his family walk away from their former land.

== Cast ==
- Balraj Sahni as Shambhu Maheto
- Nirupa Roy as Parvati (Paro) Maheto
- Ratan Kumar as Kanhaiya Maheto
- Nana Palsikar as Gangu Maheto (Shambhu's father)
- Meena Kumari as Thakurain
- Mehmood as Preetam
- Jagdeep as Laloo Ustad, Shoe-Shine boy
- Nasir Hussain as Rickshaw puller
- Murad as Thakur Harnam Singh
- Rajlakshmi Devi as Nayabji
- Ramayan Tiwari as Paro's Molester
- Ashit Kumar Sen as the Savory Seller
- Krishna Kant as The Judge

== Production ==
In 1952, at the first International Film Festival in Mumbai, director Bimal Roy saw Vittorio De Sica's 1948 Italian film Bicycle Thieves (1954). In the train while he was returning home, he decided to make his next film as real as the film and shot on location. His wife, Manobina Roy, recalled her excited husband instructing his unit to come up with a story right after the screening. The film was based on Rickshawalla, a short story written by composer Salil Chowdhury. It revolved around a farmer who desperately pounds the streets of Kolkata to earn the Rs 235 needed to save his two acres of land, only to lose it to the industrialisation. Chowdhury agreed to Roy taking his idea, but on the condition that he would score the music.

Initially Roy had planned to cast Paidi Jairaj, Trilok Kapoor and Nazir Hussain in the lead, then he saw the performance of Balraj Sahni in Hum Log (1951) and decided to cast him. This decision of Roy was criticised by his team as Sahni had mostly done rich roles. To better prepare for the role, Balraj Sahni actually rehearsed for the role by pulling a rickshaw on the streets of Calcutta. He interacted with many rickshaw pullers and some of them were facing the same situation as portrayed in the movie. Actress Nirupa Roy had mostly done the role of Hindu goddess in several mythological films till that time. She was cast in the role of Parvati. She wept in real for her scenes in the film, saying, "this is the first film I didn't use glycerine for tears."

The films title is derived from a famous poem by Rabindranath Tagore, called "Dui Bigha Jomi". Bimal Roy distributed the film abroad with the name "Calcutta – The Cruel City". The measurement of Bigha varies from state to state. In Bengal, where the movie is based, 3 bigha is one acre (4,000 m^{2}). Roy filmed Parineeta (1953) and Do Bigha Zamin at the same time in Kolkata. Hrishikesh Mukherjee was the film's editor and scenario writer. He asked Meena Kumari if she'd do a cameo in the film, on which she agreed after seeing the stills of the film.

== Awards and nominations ==
- 1st Filmfare Awards (1954)
  - Winner – Best Film
  - Winner – Best Director – Bimal Roy
- 1st National Film Awards (India)
  - Winner – All India Certificate of Merit for Best Feature Film
- 7th Cannes Film Festival (1954)
  - Winner – Prix International (International Prize)
  - Nominated – Grand Prize (Best Film)
- Karlovy Vary International Film Festival
  - Winner – Prize for Social Progress

== Songs ==
The music for the film was composed by Salil Chowdhury, with lyrics written by Shailendra. In an interview with All India Radio, Chowdhury described the tune for "Dharti Kahe Pukar Ke" having been inspired by a Red Army march song as well as influenced by Bhairavi (hence the added stanza and Aalap at the beginning of the song), thus giving it a Komal Gandhara (Ga) lilt to make it softer.

Song	Singer	Raga
"Aaja Ri Aa, Nindiya Tu Aa"	Lata Mangeshkar	
"Dharti Kahe Pukar Ke"	Lata Mangeshkar, Manna Dey	Bhairavi (Hindustani)
"Hariyala Sawan Dhol Bajata Aaya"	Lata Mangeshkar, Manna Dey	
"Ajab Tori Duniya Ho Mere Raja"	Mohammed Rafi	
