= Bimal Roy =

Indian film director (1909–1966)

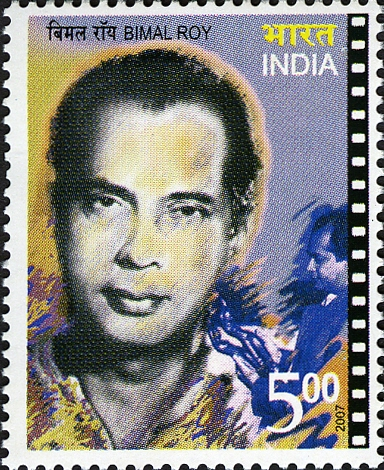
- Roy on a 2007 stamp
- Born: 12 July 1909; Dhaka district, Dhamrai Upazila, Suapur, Bangladesh, British India
- Died: 7 January 1966 (aged 56); Bombay, Maharashtra, India
- Occupations: Producer and director
- Years active: 1934–1966
- Notable work: Do Bigha Zamin (1953); Parineeta (1953); Biraj Bahu (1954); Devdas (1955); Madhumati (1958); Yahudi (1958); Sujata (1959); Parakh (1960); Bandini (1963)
- Spouse: Manobina Roy
- Children: 4, including Rinki Bhattacharya, Joy Bimal Roy
- Awards: 4 Filmfare Award for Best Film; 7 Filmfare Award for Best Director

Bimal Roy (12 July 1909 – 7 January 1966) was an Indian film director. He is particularly noted for his realistic and socialistic films such as Do Bigha Zamin, Parineeta, Biraj Bahu, Devdas, Madhumati, Sujata, Parakh and Bandini, making him an important director of Hindi cinema. Inspired by Italian neo-realistic cinema, he made Do Bigha Zamin after watching Vittorio De Sica's Bicycle Thieves (1948). His work is particularly known for his mise en scène which he employed to portray realism. He won a number of awards throughout his career, including eleven Filmfare Awards, two National Film Awards, and the International Prize of the Cannes Film Festival. Madhumati won 9 Filmfare Awards in 1958, a record held for 37 years.

== Personal life ==
Bimal Roy was born on 12 July 1909, to a Bengali Baidya family in Suapur, Dhaka, which was then part of the Eastern Bengal and Assam province of British India and is now part of Bangladesh. He produced many movies in Bengali and Hindi. He married Manobina Roy in 1936. His daughter, Rinki was married to film director Basu Bhattacharya (1934–1997). The couple had three children: a son Aditya Bhattacharya (b. 1965), who is a film director, and two daughters, Chimoo Acharya and Anwesha Arya, the latter a writer. Chimoo Acharya is married to Sumit Acharya, a Dubai-based corporate executive.

Bimal's great-granddaughter and Chimoo's daughter, Drisha is married to Karan Deol, son of Sunny Deol and grandson of Dharmendra.

== Career ==
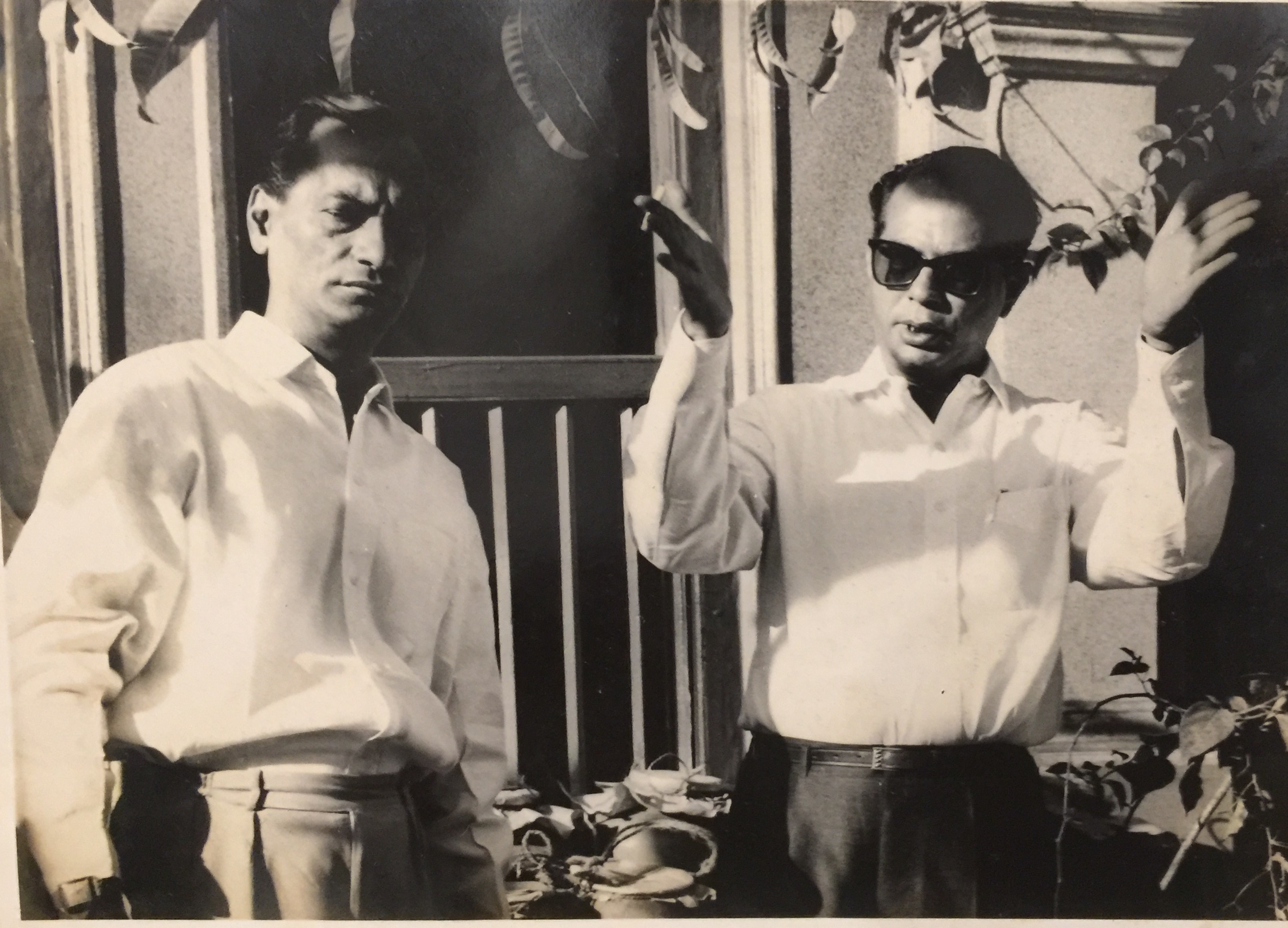
Roy (left) during the shooting of Kabuliwala

Bimal Roy moved to Calcutta and entered the field of cinema as a camera assistant with New Theatres Pvt. Ltd. During this time, he assisted director P.C. Barua as Publicity Photographer, on the hit 1935 film Devdas, starring K.L. Saigal. In the 1940s and 1950s Roy was part of the parallel cinema movement in post-war India. He collaborated on Anjangarh (1948), one of the last major films of the New Theatres, however, the Kolkata-based film industry was now on the decline, thus Roy shifted his base to Bombay (now Mumbai), along with his team in 1950, which included Hrishikesh Mukherjee (editor), Nabendu Ghosh (screenwriter), Asit Sen (assistant director), Kamal Bose (cinematographer) and later, Salil Chaudhury (music director), and by 1952 he had restarted the second phase of his career with Maa (1952), for Bombay Talkies. He was famous for his romantic-realist melodramas that took on important social issues while still being entertaining. He was a filmmaker of great and in-depth understanding of human strengths and weaknesses. In 1959, he was a member of the jury at the 1st Moscow International Film Festival.

He died of cancer on 7 January 1966 at the age of 56. He was survived by four children: daughters Rinki Bhattacharya, Yashodhara Roy and Aparajita Sinha, and his only son, Joy Roy. His eldest daughter, Rinki Bhattacharya, married the director Basu Bhattacharya against the wishes of both their families. The marriage collapsed within a few years, but resulted in the birth of a son, the actor and screenplay writer Aditya Bhattacharya. Rinki Bhattacharya now heads the Bimal Roy Memorial Committee. and his great-granddaughter Drisha Acharya married Karan Deol

== Awards ==
Bimal Roy has received several awards.

Filmfare Awards

- 1953: Filmfare Award for Best Film – Do Bigha Zamin
- 1953: Filmfare Award for Best Director – Do Bigha Zamin
- 1954: Filmfare Award for Best Director – Parineeta
- 1955: Filmfare Award for Best Director – Biraj Bahu
- 1958: Filmfare Award for Best Film – Madhumati
- 1958: Filmfare Award for Best Director – Madhumati
- 1959: Filmfare Award for Best Film – Sujata
- 1959: Filmfare Award for Best Director – Sujata
- 1960: Filmfare Award for Best Director – Parakh
- 1963: Filmfare Award for Best Film – Bandini
- 1963: Filmfare Award for Best Director – Bandini
- 2025: Filmfare Cine Icon Award for his enduring legacy in Hindi cinema

National Film Awards

- 1953: All India Certificate of Merit for Best Feature Film – Do Bigha Zamin
- 1954: All India Certificate of Merit for Best Feature Film – Biraj Bahu
- 1955: Certificate of Merit for Best Feature Film in Hindi – Devdas
- 1958: President's silver medal for Best Feature Film in Hindi – Madhumati
- 1959: All India Certificate of Merit for the Third Best Feature Film – Sujata
- 1963: Best Feature Film in Hindi – Bandini

Cannes Film Festival

Won International Prize:

- 1954 for Do Bigha Zamin

Nominated for Grand Prize of the Festival:

- 1954 for Do Bigha Zamin

Nominated for Palme d'Or:

- 1955 for Biraj Bahu
- 1960 for Sujata

== Music ==
Bimal Roy usually alternated between music directors Salil Chowdhury and S.D. Burman. His films featured beautiful and memorable songs, rendered by all the top playback singers of the day. Some of the notable songs from Roy's films include:

- "Jalte Hain Jiske Liye" from Sujata (1959), sung by Talat Mahmood
- "Chali Radhe Rani" from Parineeta (1953), sung by Manna Dey
- "Aa Ri Aa Nindiya" from Do Bigha Zamin (1953), music by Salil Chowdhury, sung by Lata Mangeshkar
- "Ab Aage Teri Marzi" from Devdas (1955), music by S.D. Burman, sung by Lata Mangeshkar
- "Aan Milo Aan Milo Shyam Sabere" from Devdas (1955), music by S.D. Burman, sung by Manna Dey, Geeta Dutt
- "Dil Tadap Tadap Ke Keh Raha" from Madhumati (1958), music by Salil Chowdhury, sung by Mukesh, Lata Mangeshkar
- "Suhana Safar Aur Yeh Mausam Haseen" from Madhumati (1958), music by Salil Chowdhury, sung by Mukesh
- "Aaja Re Pardesi" from Madhumati (1958), music by Salil Chowdhury, sung by Lata Mangeshkar
- "Ghadi Ghadi Mora Dil Dhadake" from Madhumati (1958), music by Salil Chowdhury, sung by Lata Mangeshkar
- "Zulmi Sang Aankh Ladi" from Madhumati (1958), music by Salil Chowdhury, sung by Lata Mangeshkar
- "O Sajana Barkha Bahaar" from Parakh (1960), music by Salil Chowdhury, sung by Lata Mangeshkar
- "Mora Gora Ang Lai Le" from Bandini (1963), music by S.D. Burman, sung by Lata Mangeshkar

== Legacy ==
Bimal Roy's influence was far-reaching, both in Indian cinema and world cinema. In Indian cinema, his influence extended to both mainstream commercial Hindi cinema and the emerging Parallel Cinema. His film Do Bigha Zamin (1953) was the first film to successfully straddle art and commercial cinema. It was a commercial and critical success, winning the International Prize at the 1954 Cannes Film Festival. As a result, the film's success paved the way for the Indian New Wave.

In commercial cinema, the most influential film he directed was perhaps Madhumati (1958), his first and only collaboration with Ritwik Ghatak (who wrote the screenplay), and one of the earliest films to deal with reincarnation. It is believed to have been the source of inspiration for many later works dealing with the theme of reincarnation in Indian cinema, Indian television, and perhaps world cinema. It may have been the source of inspiration for the American film The Reincarnation of Peter Proud (1975) and the Hindi film Karz (1980), both of which dealt with reincarnation and have been influential in their respective cultures. Karz in particular was remade several times: as the Kannada film Yuga Purusha (1989), the Tamil film Enakkul Oruvan (1984), and more recently the Bollywood film Karzzzz (2008). Karz may have also inspired the American film Chances Are (1989). The most recent film to be directly inspired by Madhumati is the hit Bollywood film Om Shanti Om (2007), which led to Roy's daughter Rinki Bhattacharya accusing the film of plagiarism and threatening legal action against its producers.

Bimal Roy discovered and gave a break to many children, such as Asha Parekh, Sona Mastan Mirza, Baby Farida, and Baby Sonu (Bablani), who would later become quite famous.

Bimal Roy's films continue to be screened at major national and international film festivals in India, Europe and North America. His films are being restored and digitised by the National Film Archive of India (NFAI) at Pune. In July 2014, Prince of Wales Museum, Mumbai hosted an exhibition; Bimal Roy: Life & Times, organised in collaboration with his children. The exhibits included screening of the films; Madhumati, Sujata and Bandini, besides film posters, costumes and memorabilia, including an Arriflex camera used to shoot Devdas and Sujata.

The Bimal Roy Memorial Trophy has been awarded every year since 1997, by the Bimal Roy Memorial & Film Society to honor both experienced artists and other contributors from the Indian film industry as well as new and upcoming outstanding young filmmakers.

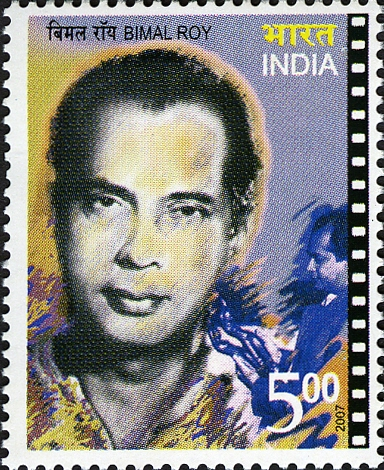
Stamp by India post c. 2007

A postage stamp, bearing his face, was released by India Post to honour him on 8 January 2007.

== Filmography ==
Director
Year	Film	Producer	Notes
1943	Bengal Famine		English
1944	Udayer Pathey		Bengali Director, Writer and cinematographer
1945	Hamrahi	New Theatres	Writer and cinematographer
1948	Anjangarh		
1949	Mantramugdhu		
1950	Pehla Aadmi		
1952	Maa		
1953	Parineeta	Ashok Kumar	Filmfare Award for Best Director
1953	Do Bigha Zamin	(Himself)	Filmfare Award for Best Film Filmfare Award for Best Director. The story was written by Salil Chaudhury.
1954	Biraj Bahu	Hiten Choudhury	Filmfare Award for Best Director
1954	Naukari	(Himself)	
1954	Baap Beti		
1955	Devdas	(Himself)	
1958	Madhumati	(Himself)	Highest-grossing film of 1958. It garnered 9 Filmfare Awards, a record held for 37 years. Its story was written by Rwitwick Ghatak
1958	Yahudi	Savak B. Vacha	
1959	Sujata	(Himself)	Filmfare Award for Best Director
1960	Parakh	(Himself)	Filmfare Award for Best Director
1960	Nader Nimai		Bengali
1961	Immortal Stupa		
1962	Prem Patra	(Himself)	
1963	Bandini	(Himself)	It won six Filmfare Awards including Filmfare Award for Best Film and Filmfare Award for Best Director
1964	Life and Message of Swami Vivekananda		English on Swami Vivekananda
Documentary
1941	Tins for India		

Producer
Year	Film	Director	Notes
1955	Amanat	Aravind Sen	
1956	Parivar	Asit Sen	
1957	Apradhi Kaun?	Asit Sen	
1960	Usne Kaha Tha	Moni Bhattacharjee	
1961	Kabuliwala	Hemen Gupta	
1961	Benazir	S. Khalil	
1967	Gautama the Buddha	Rajbans Khanna	Films Division of India
Editor
1949	Mahal	Kamal Amrohi	
1951	Deedar	Nitin Bose	
1956	Satranj	Gyan Mukherjee	
1958	Sitaron Se Aagey	Satyen Bose	
1960	Kalpana	R.K. Rakhan	
1962	Umeed	Nitin Bose	
1963	Nartaki	Nitin Bose	
1963	Meri Surat Teri Ankhen	R.K. Rakhan	
Cinematographer
1934	Chandidas	Nitin Bose	Assistant Cinematographer
1934	Daku Mansoor	Nitin Bose	
1935	Devdas	Pramathesh Barua	
1936	Grihadah	Pramathesh Barua	
1936	Maya	Pramathesh Barua	
1937	Mukti	Pramathesh Barua	
1938	Abhagin	Prafulla Roy	
1939	Bardidi	Amar Mullick	
1940	Abhinetri	Amar Mullick	
1940	Meenakshi	Modhu Bose	

== Bibliography ==
- Rinki Roy Bhattacharya (2009). Bimal Roy: The Man who spoke in pictures. Penguin Books Limited. ISBN 978-81-8475-818-4.
- Rinki Roy Bhattacharya (2014). Bimal Roy's Madhumati: Untold Stories from Behind the Scenes. Rupa Publications. ISBN 978-8129129161.
