= Sharadindu Bandyopadhyay =

Indian writer

- Born: 30 March 1899; Jaunpur, United Provinces of Agra and Oudh, British India (now in Uttar Pradesh, India)
- Died: 22 September 1970 (aged 71); Pune, Maharashtra, India
- Education: Vidyasagar College
- Occupation: Writer
- Writing career
- Language: Bengali
- Notable work: Byomkesh Bakshi

Sharadindu Bandyopadhyay (30 March 1899 – 22 September 1970) was an Indian Bengali-language writer. He was actively involved with Bengali cinema as well as Bollywood. The creator of the Bengali detective Byomkesh Bakshi, Sharadindu composed stories of a wide array of varieties including: novels, short stories, crime and detective stories, plays and screenplays. He wrote historical fiction like Kaler Mandira, Gourmollar (initially named as Mouri Nodir Teere), Tumi Sandhyar Megh, Tungabhadrar Teere, Chuya-Chandan, Maru O Sangha (later made into a Hindi film named Trishagni), Sadashib series and stories of the unnatural with the recurring character Baroda. Besides, he composed many songs and poems.

== Personal life and education ==
He was born to Tarabhushan and Bijaliprabha Bandyopadhyay at his maternal grandparents' home in Jaunpur, United Province, India on 30 March 1899. The Bandyopadhyay family's residence was at Purnia, Bihar, India, where his father worked but the family originally hailed from Baranagar, North Kolkata, West Bengal, India. He completed his matriculation in 1915 from a school in Munger, in Bihar. He wrote his first story 'Pretpuri', a Boroda story, when he was only 15 years. After matriculation, he joined the Vidyasagar College, Kolkata. Sisir Bhaduri, the doyen of Bengali stage, was his English professor there. After completing graduation, he went on to study law in Patna. He was only thirty years old when he gave up his practice and started working as a writer. In 1928, Himangshu Roy invited him to Bombay to write screenplays. Till 1952 he wrote films, and then settled down in Pune to pursue a full-fledged career as a writer.

== Characters ==
=== Byomkesh Bakshi ===
Byomkesh Bakshi is a detective who calls himself Satyanweshi or the truth-seeker. He is known for his proficiency with observation, logical reasoning, and forensic science which he uses to solve complicated cases, usually murders.

=== Boroda ===
Boroda is a ghost-chaser, obsessed with life-after death and in writer's words Bhootanweshi. Like the Mejokorta of Premendra Mitra, he has direct interactions with ghosts. He recounts his many encounters with spirits much to the chagrin of his friends. In Byomkesh O Boroda, the two characters met each other. This series of short stories provide great examples of spine-chilling atmosphere and last-minute twists. The list of stories in chronological order:

1. Pretpuri – 1915
2. Rokto Khoddot – 1929
3. Tiktiki'r Dim – 1929
4. Moron Bhomra – 1932
5. Ashareeri – 1933
6. Sobuj Chosma – 1933
7. Moron Dol - 1934
8. Bohurupi – 1937
9. Protidhwoni – 1938
10. Akashbani – 1946
11. Dehantor – 1949
12. Nilkar – 1958
13. Malkosh – 1962

=== Sadashib ===
Sadashib, (Note: Also written as 'Sadashiv' by some sources.) or Sadashib Rao, is a fictional character of a young lad starring in a series of short stories of Sharadindu Bandyopadhyay. The protagonist of the series Sadashib is a Marathi soldier hailing from the village Dongarhpur. This character was created with the backdrop of 16th century Maharashtra when the Maratha-Adil Shah-Mughal antipathy was at its pinnacle. The conflict of Chhatrapati Shivaji and Aurangzeb provided the series with its own distinctive plot.

=== Background ===
As per the pretext of the series, the Mughals were residing on Daulatabad north of Maharashtra and Sultan Adil Shah was in the charge of Bijapur fort in the south. Although at the time of the story's beginning the forces of Shivaji had not yet earned the total trust of entire mass, they were on the rise to end the daily oppression of the simple villagers and the common people in the hands of the tyrant rulers. During this time Sadashib, an orphan boy of around seventeen to eighteen was growing up in his maternal uncle's house in the village Dongarhpur with his uncle and aunt who strongly despised him. One day, his maternal uncle Sakharam decides to throw him out of his home after consulting with the villages head and other elders citing the reason that he is unable to provide sustenance to his household in the time of war and crisis. Sadashiv, who has nobody in the village to turn to leaves, but his friend Kumkum, the daughter of village elder Biththal Patil, advises him to go and join Shivaji's troops. Later, Kumkum helps him escape on the ailing horse of her father. Sadashiv sets course for Puna, (Note: Now called Pune.) but he encounters Shivaji's forces en route, eventually helps them unknowingly. They take him to Torna, where Shivaji was camping and he joins Shivaji's force and gets popular by the day on the merit of his young as well as cunning stature. In the passage of time, he becomes the go-to-man of Shivaji and helps to tide him over of different problems.

=== List of Novels in Sadashib series ===
#	Title	Publication	Bibliography	Description
1	Sadashib er Adikando	Mauchak patrika	Sadashib er Tinkando	The escape of Sadashib from his village and his joining in Shivaji's forces is the nub of the story. So it is considered as the prelude to the series.
2	Sadashib er Agnikando	Mauchak patrika	Sadashib er Tinkando	Captain (Note: Called 'Senapati' in the story.) Liyakat Khan, the commander-in-chief of Adil Shah, attacks Torna Fort with 7000 Bijapuri soldiers to captivate Shivaji. But Shivaji hits out a cunning plan and sends Sadashib in the guise of a lamb-rearer to accomplish the mission.
3	Sadashib er Douro Douri Kando		Sadashib er Tinkando	When Shivaji starts to assault and occupy a number of Bijapur's forts and prevents their invasion, the Sultan Adil Shah loses faith on Shivaji's father Shahji Bhonsle, one of the feudal lords of Bijapur. Shivaji fears that out of distrust his father might be assassinated, so he makes a plan to inform Shahji about the coming danger. Sadashib on whom the task falls for being unknown to the Bijapur's soldiers, sets out on an adventurous trail mounted on one of Shivaji's favorite horses, Sindhughotok. Various facets of the then Maharashtra has come up on the pages in this lengthiest story of this series.
4	Sadashib er Hoi Hoi Kando		Sadashib er Hoi Hoi Kando	Sadashib returns to his village Dongarhpur a year after his escape, with a small task to accomplish on the way. He had thought that the village folk would now respect him. He has also bought a ring for Kumkum from Jinji and he was excited about that prospect. But things take a turn in the passage of time.
5	Sadashib er Ghora Ghora kando	Sandesh	Sadashib er Hoi Hoi Kando O Sadashib er Ghora Ghora kando	An epidemic has made scarce of horse in Maharashtra. The only place one can avail them is the Chandragarh fort, where Shivaji's maternal uncle Balawant Rao is the lord. He had made Shivaji swear an oath when he was a child that he would never by any means try to capture the Chandragarh fort. Until now Shivaji has kept his promise but now when he is in desperate need of horses as Balawant refuses to sell him horses at normal rate. Being unable to pay the high price as demanded by Balawant, he decides to obtain them by tricks and yet again Sadashib works as his right hand.

Source: Dey, Anindita (2021)

=== Characters ===
- Sadashib – Protagonist of the series, an orphan boy of around seventeen dwelling in the village Dongarhpur on the Paschim ghat mountain range with his maternal uncle Sakharam. He is driven out of the village by his uncle and soon after he joins Shivaji's forces and becomes one of his loyal soldiers.
- Kumkum/Kunku – Daughter of village elder Biththal Patil and Sadashib's childhood friend, his only well-wisher in the village. It is on her advice that Sadashiv sets out to join Shivaji's forces. After the first story of the series, they again meet each other in the story, 'Sadashiber Hoi Hoi Kando'.
- Shivaji – The national hero of Maharashtra, but during the narration of the stories he was considered as a bandit by the commoners.
- Shahji Bhonsle – One of the feudal lords of Bijapur, Shivaji's father.
- Jijabai – Shivaji's mother and the wife of Shahji Bhonsle. She is the prime inspiration behind Shivaji's long-cherished dreams of an independent Maharashtra. She takes care of Sadashib as her own son.
- Tanaji – Tanaji Malsare, Shivaji's minister and childhood companion.
- Jesaji – Jesaji Kank, another childhood pal and minister of Shivaji.
- Ratnaji – Shivaji's childhood friend and the spy of him. Disguised as a foot soldier of Bijapur.
- Sakharam – The miser and heartless uncle of Sadashib whom he strongly despises.
- Biththal Patil – One of the village elders of Sadashib's native village and Kumkum's father. Sadashb stole his ailing horse when he was escaping the village.

=== Incomplete Stories ===
Sharadindu Bandyopadhyay was advised and motivated to write about Shivaji through the view of a young soldier by his friend and fellow author, Rajshekhar Basu. There were four more drafts or incomplete stories obtained from Sharadindu Bandyopadhyay's notebook, which are —

- Sadashiber Roktarokti Kando
- Sadashiber Kelenkari Kando
- Sadashiber Bidghute Kando
- Sadashiber Mahamari Kando

It is understood that he wanted to script the entire history of Shivaji's rise to the behest of glory and success through this series, but he could not finish them due to his untimely death in 1970.

=== Adaptations ===
- The five Sadashib Stories have been translated into English by Sreejata Gupta in the book 'Band of Soldiers: A Year on the Road with Shivaji'.
- Sadashib was adapted as comics in the 1980s for the Anandamela edited by Nirendranath Chakravarty, illustrated by Bimal Das and adapted by Tarun Majumdar.
- Radio play by Akashbani.
- The Sunday Suspense series of 98.3 Radio Mirchi (Kolkata) adapted all the Sadashib stories, portraying RJ Somak as the protagonist.

== Bibliography ==
=== Byomkesh Bakshi ===
1. 1932 Pother Kanta aka The (Thorns in the Path) Gramophone Pin Mystery
2. 1932 Satyanweshi aka The Truth-Seeker
3. 1932 Seemanto-Heera aka The Hidden Heirloom
4. 1933 Makorshar Rosh aka The Venom of the Tarantula
5. 1933 Arthamanartham aka Where There's a Will
6. 1933 Chorabali aka Quicksand
7. 1935 Agnibaan aka Calamity Strikes
8. 1935 Uposonghaar aka An Encore for Byomkesh
9. 1936 Raktomukhi Neela aka The Bloody Sapphire
10. 1936 Byomkesh O Boroda aka Byomkesh and Barada
11. 1951 Chitrachor aka Picture Imperfect
12. 1952 Durgo Rahasya The Mystery of the Fortress
13. 1953 Chiriyakhana aka The Menagerie
14. 1955 Adim Ripu aka The Ancient Enemy.
15. 1956 Banhi-patanga aka Flame and Moth
16. 1956 Rokter Daag (Bloodstains)
17. 1958 Monimondon aka The Jewel Case
18. 1959 Amriter Mrityu aka The Death of Amrito
19. 1959 Shailo Rahasya aka Phantom Client
20. 1960 Achin Pakhi aka The Avenger
21. 1961 Kohen Kobi Kalidas aka Thus spoke Kavi Kalidasa
22. 1961 Adrishyo Trikon aka The Invisible Triangle
23. 1961 Khunji Khunji Nari aka The Case of the Missing Will
24. 1961 Adwitiyo (Unique)
25. 1963 Mognomoinak aka The Secret Berg
26. 1963 Dushtochokro aka The Crooked Circle
27. 1964 Henyalir Chhondo aka The Rhythm of Riddles
28. 1964 Room Nombor Dui aka Room Number 2
29. 1965 Chholonar Chhondo aka Man in a Red Coat
30. 1967 Shajarur Kanta aka The Quills of the Porcupine
31. 1968 Benishonghar aka The Killing of Beni
32. 1969 Lohar Biskut aka Iron Biscuits
33. 1970 Bishupal Bodh (The Slaying of Bishupal)

=== Sadashib ===
1. Sadashiber Adikando
2. Sadashiber Agnikando
3. Sadashiber Dourodouri Kando
4. Sadashiber Hoi-Hoi Kando
5. Sadashiber Ghora-Ghora Kando

=== Historical Fiction ===
'Among contemporary writers of Bengali – nobody could write a historical fiction quite like him. Who can create that atmosphere, who else has the wit and humour...his prose had a different taste altogether – I am rather fond of it...' that's what Sunil Gangopadhyay said about Sharadindu Bandyopadhyay regarding his historical novels and stories. Set in different periods of Indian history, from the Pre-Aryan days to the Gupta, Mauryan era and the age of the Mughals, they are described as a blend of twists and turns, romance, adventure and revenge, with characters written using an idiom and vocabulary intended to suit the historical setting.

Saradindu himself said – 'My stories are not fictionalised history, they are historical fiction.' Since the writer spent the latter half of his life in Maharashtra, Pune and the Western Ghats form a picturesque backdrop to quite a few of his stories, many of which narrate tales of the Maratha hero, Chhatrapati Shivaji.

- Sadashib series
- Kaler Mandira [কালের মন্দিরা] (1951)
- GaurMallar [গৌড়মল্লার] (1954)
- Tumi Sandhyar Megh [তুমি সন্ধ্যার মেঘ] (1958)
- Kumarsambhaber Kabi [কুমারসম্ভবের কবি] (1963)
- Tungabhadrar Teere [তুঙ্গভদ্রার তীরে] (1965)
- Jhinder Bondi [ঝিন্দের বন্দী]
- Rajodrohee [রাজোদ্রোহী]

=== Short stories ===
- Jathismar [জাতিস্মর] (1933)
- Chuya-Chandan [চুয়া-চন্দন] (1935)
- BishKonya [বিষকন্যা] (1942)
- Sada Prithibi [সাদা পৃথিবী] (1948)
- Emon Dine [এমন দিনে] (1963)
- ShankhaKankan [শঙ্খকঙ্কণ] (1963)
- Kortar Kirti [কর্তার কীর্তি]
- Timingil [তিমিঙ্গিল]
- Protidwondee [প্রতিদ্বন্দী]
- Adim Nrityo [আদিম নৃত্য]
- Kutub Shirshe [কুতুব শীর্ষে]
- Vendeta [ভেনডেটা]
- Mone Mone [মনে মনে]
- Jhi [ঝি]
- Toothbrush [টুথব্রাশ]
- Arob Sagorer Rosikota [আরব সাগরের রসিকতা]
- Premik [প্রেমিক]
- Roopkotha [রূপকথা]
- GronthiRohosyo [গ্রন্থিরহস্য]
- Bhutor Chondrobindu [ভূতোর চন্দ্রবিন্দু]
- SondehoJonok Byapar [সন্দেহজনক ব্যাপার]
- Sekalini [সেকালিনী]
- Asomapto [অসমাপ্ত]
- Mukhos [মুখোস]
- Poriksha [পরীক্ষা]
- Vokti Vajon [ভক্তি ভোজন]
- Bohu Bighnani [বহু বিঘ্নানি]
- Pagjotish [প্রাগ্জ্যোতিষ]
- Raktakhadyot [রক্তখদ্যোৎ]
- Amitabha [অমিতাভ]
- Biryashulka [বীর্য্যশুল্কা]
- Tikimedh [টিকিমেধ]
- Mritpradeep [মৃৎপ্রদীপ]
- Moktar Bhoot [মোক্তার ভূত]
- Tandraharan [তন্দ্রাহরণ]
- Andhakarey [অন্ধকারে]
- Nakhadarpan [নখদর্পন]
- Nandangarh Rahasya[নন্দনগড় রহস্য]
- Madhu Malati [মধু মালতী]
- Kamini [কামিনী]
- Kalo Morog [কালো মরগ]
- Chhuri [ছুরি]
- Choto Karta [ছোট কর্তা]
- Bhoot Bhabishyat [ভূত ভবিষ্যত]
- Aangti [আংটি]
- Doibaat [দোইবাত]
- Laal Panja [লাল পাঞ্জা]
- Shunyo Shudhu Shunyo Noi [শুন্যো শুধু শুন্যো নোই]
- Swami Chopetanondo [স্বামী চপেটানন্দ]
- Pintu [পিন্টু]

=== Long Stories ===
- Dadar Kirti [দাদার কীর্তি]

=== Collections ===
- Sharadindu Omnibus [শরদিন্দু অমনিবাস] (in 12 volumes) (edited by Pratul Chandra Gupta, Bandyopadhyay's friend and published by the Ananda Publishers, Kolkata).

== Filmography ==
Screenplay:

- Bhabhi (1938) directed by Franz Osten for Bombay Talkies, with story by Sharadindu Bandyopadhyay. Based on the short story "Bisher Dhoan".
- Vachan (1938) directed by Franz Osten for Bombay Talkies.
- Durga [দুর্গা] (1939)
- Kangan (1939)
- Navjeevan (1939)
- Azad (1940)
- Jhinder Bandi [ঝিন্দের বন্দী] (1961) —Directed by Tapan Sinha is based on a recreation of Prisoner of Zenda written by Anthony Hope. This novel is categorised as one of Sharadindu's romantic novels.
- Chiriyakhana [চিড়িয়াখানা] (1966) —Directed by Satyajit Ray is based on one of the most intricate detective novels ever written in Bengali, featuring Uttam Kumar as the supersleuth Byomkesh Bakshi.

=== TV series based on his writings ===
- Byomkesh Bakshi (TV series) (1993, 1997) – A Hindi TV series based on Byomkesh Bakshi directed by Basu Chatterjee made for DD National. The series stars Rajit Kapur as Byomkesh Bakshi, K.K. Raina as Ajit Bandyopadhyay and Sukanya Kulkarni as Satyavati. The series had two season. First season aired in 1993 and the second season in 1997.
- Byomkesh (2014–2015) – A Bengali crime drama television series based on the Byomkesh Bakshi made for Colors Bangla channel. The series stars Gaurav Chakrabarty, Saugata Bandyopadhyay and Ridhima Ghosh as Byomkesh Bakshi, Ajit and Satyabati respectively.
- Byomkesh (2017)

=== Films based on his writings ===
==== Bengali ====
- Jhinder Bandi [ঝিন্দের বন্দি] (1961) — Directed by Tapan Sinha and produced by B. N. Roy Productions. It starred Uttam Kumar in dual roles, alongside Soumitra Chatterjee and Arundhati Devi in another leads.
- Rajodrohi [রাজদ্রোহী] (1966) — Directed by Niren Lahiri, it also starred Uttam Kumar with Anjana Bhowmick in lead roles.
- Shajarur Kanta (1974) —Directed by actress-turned-director Manju Dey and produced by Star Productions was the second film of the Bakshi series. Satindra Bhattacharya replaced Uttam Kumar as Bakshi while Shailen Mukherjee reprised his role as Ajit.
- Dadar Kirti [দাদার কীর্তি] (1980) —Directed by Tarun Majumdar. This full-length feature is based on a novel of the same name.
- Meghmukti [মেঘমুক্তি] (1981) —Directed by Tarun Majumdar. This full-length feature is based on a short-story of named Kortar Kirti.
- Magno Mainak [মগ্ন মৈনাক] (2009)—Directed by Swapan Ghoshal who also directed the two Bengali TV series on the sleuth. The film is featuring several TV actors. TV actor Shuvrajit Dutta is playing Bakshi.
- Byomkesh Bakshi [ব্যোমকেশ বক্সী] (2010) —Directed by Anjan Dutt. This movie is based on the story Adim Ripu [আদিম রিপু]. Abir Chatterjee plays Byomkesh Bakshi while Saswata Chatterjee plays Ajit. Swastika Mukherjee plays Shiuli the bar dancer and Chandan Sen plays arms dealer Batul. Dutta plans to make a trilogy.
- Abar Byomkesh [আবার ব্যোমকেশ] (2012) —Directed by Anjan Dutt. This movie is based on the story Chitrachor [চিত্রচোর ]. This series is expected to be followed by Kohen Kobi Kalidas .
- Maya Bazaar [মায়া বাজার] (2012) – Directed by Joydeep Ghosh. It is an anthology film containing three short films. Two of them were based on two short stories (viz. Dehantor [ দেহান্তর ] and Shunyo Shudhu Shunyo Noy [ শূন্য শুধু শূন্য নয় ] ) by Bandyopadhyay.
- Jekhane Bhooter Bhoy [যেখানে ভুতের ভয়] (2012), a film directed by Sandip Ray, is based on three separate stories, the last one being Sharadindu Bandyopadhyay's 'Bhoot Bhabishyat'(ভুত-ভবিষ্যৎ), starring Saswata Chatterjee and Paran Banerjee in lead roles.
- Satyanweshi [সত্যান্বেষী] (2013), the last film directed by Rituparno Ghosh and released in 2013, is based on the story "Chorabali" [চোরাবালি, Quick sand]. Sujoy Ghosh played the role of Byomkesh, with Anindya Chattopadhyay as Ajit.
- In the film Chaar (2014), one story (Porikkha) is written by Sharadindu Bandyopadhyay. The film is directed by Sandip Ray.
- Byomkesh Phire Elo [ব্যোমকেশ ফিরে এলো] (2014) —Directed by Anjan Dutt. This movie is based on the Byomkesh story Beni Sanghar (বেণীসংহার).
- Shajarur Kanta [সজারুর কাঁটা] (2015) —Directed by Saibal Mitra. This movie is based on the Byomkesh story of same name.
- Byomkesh Bakshi [ব্যোমকেশ বক্সী] (2015) —Directed by Anjan Dutt. This movie is based on the Byomkesh story Kohen Kobi Kalidas (কহেন কবি কালিদাস).
- Har Har Byomkesh [বহ্নি পতঙ্গ] (2015) —Directed by Arindam Sil. This movie is based on the Byomkesh story Banhi Patanga (বন্হী পতঙ্গ).
- Monchora [মনচোরা ] (2015) —Directed by Sandip Ray. This movie is based on the novel of same name.
- Baroda O Bohurupi [বরদা ও বহুরূপী] (2016) —Directed by Neelotpal Sinharoy and acted by Sambrita Ghatak. Short movie, based on the Story Bohurupi (বহুরূপী)
- Byomkesh O Chiriyakhana [ব্যোমকেশ ও চিড়িয়াখানা ] (2016) —Directed by Anjan Dutta. This movie is based on the byomkesh story "Chiriyakhana"(চিড়িয়াখানা).
- Byomkesh Pawrbo (2016) —Directed by Arindam Sil.
- Byomkesh O Agnibaan (2017) —Directed by Anjan Dutt.
- Byomkesh Gotro (2018) —Directed by Arindam Sil.
- Satyanweshi Byomkesh (2019) —Directed by Sayantan Ghosal. Parambrata Chatterjee played the character of Byomkesh and Rudranil Ghosh played the character of Ajit. This movie is based on the byomkesh story "Magnamainak"(মগ্নমৈনাক).

==== Hindi ====
- Trishagni (1988) is a film directed by Nabendu Ghosh, based on Sharadindu's historical short story Moru O Sangho.
- Detective Byomkesh Bakshi (2015) directed by Dibakar Banerjee. The lead role is played by Sushant Singh Rajput and the film is set in 1942.

== See also ==
- Byomkesh Bakshi in other media
