= Palador Pictures =

Indian film production company

Palador Pictures Pvt. Ltd.
- Company type: Private
- Industry: Home video
- Founded: 2005 Mumbai, India
- Headquarters: Mumbai, India
- Key people: Gautam Shiknis, Founder & Managing Director; Mohan Polamar, Co-Founder & Joint MD
- Products: DVD
- Website: www.mypalador.com

Palador Pictures (also Palador Pictures Private Limited) is a content production, programming and publishing company based in Mumbai, India, dealing mainly with the acquisition and distribution of foreign-language films, also known as world cinema, in the Indian subcontinent through DVD, television and theatre.

It was the first company to focus on world cinema in India in 2005. Published reports indicate that Palador controls the distribution of close to 1000 films made from the 1920s to the present.

== Company name ==
"Palador" is derived from "Pala", a fictional island in the novel The Island by Aldous Huxley. Palador is also a planet in Arthur C. Clarke's short science fiction story "Rescue Party," the first story Clarke sold. It is also the name of a dental alloy.

== Acquired films ==
Cover for Palador Pictures' DVD release of Seven Samurai.

The company has acquired films from many parts of the world, and especially at film festivals. It acquired the rights to around 300 films during the Cannes Film Festival of 2007, including the 'Extra-Special' anniversary prize-winning film Paranoid Park. In a recent Berlin International Film Festival, Palador is said to have acquired films like Shine a Light, the biography of the Rolling Stones directed by Martin Scorsese, and the Lou Reed documentary Berlin.

On television, eight films from Palador's catalog were shown in association with Tata Sky during October–November 2007, including films by directors Akira Kurosawa, Wim Wenders, François Truffaut and Wong Kar-wai. The company recently closed a deal with Zee Studio to show 26 of its films for six months.

=== DVD releases ===
Palador has launched a DVD Label called 'The One World Collection' and have released world cinema titles under it. The films are being sold as box sets and as individual titles. Some of the movies include: Akira Kurosawa's Seven Samurai, Yojimbo, Throne of Blood; and Ingmar Bergman's Wild Strawberries and Summer Interlude.

Palador has tied up with Moser Baer, to offer 50 films on DVD. These titles expected to cost INR 399, will mark the entry of Moser Baer, known for their inexpensive DVDs and VCDs, into a premium category.

== Online promotion ==
The company is promoting world cinema online via different partnerships. It is selling its DVD titles and box sets with Indiaplaza.in and from their own online store. Akira Kurosawa, Wong Kar-wai, François Truffaut and World Cinema Collectors Box Sets are available in these stores.

As a promotional measure Palador has also begun a 'Trip To Cannes' contest that allows those that buy these box sets to win a trip to the Cannes Film Festival 2008.

The online store does not have customer support, and there are no listed phone numbers to contact in case of ordering or shipping problems. E-mails to their support team are not entertained in case of disputes.

== Valuation ==
Palador raised funding of US$6 million from private investors including Mahesh Mathai, the director of Indian film, Bhopal Express in August 2007, after a 15% dilution of equity. By this estimation the valuation of Palador is US$40 million. The valuation is understated considering that the world cinema market in the country has been estimated to reach a valuation of Indian Rs.1,500 crore by 2009 and compose 20 percent of the non-Indian language movie segment in India.

== Dispute with UTV ==
The company was in a joint venture agreement with UTV Software Communications Ltd. in 2006–07. The partnership soured and UTV terminated the contract, citing 'material breach and non-performance' in May 2007. However, after a court arbitration UTV had to unconditionally withdraw the allegations in August 2007. Things soured further between the two and Palador took UTV to court in November 2007.
