= DeSu7 =

2026 Indian Bengali film by Dev

- First look poster
- Directed by: Dev
- Screenplay by: Rohit-Soumya; Samrat Sharma; Dev
- Story by: Dev
- Produced by: Dev; Satadeep Saha
- Starring: Dev; Subhashree Ganguly; Anirban Bhattacharya; Rajatava Dutta; Kanchan Mullick
- Cinematography: Subhankar Bhar
- Edited by: Md. Kalam
- Music by: Savvy; Nilayan Chatterjee
- Production companies: Dev Entertainment Ventures; SSR Cinemas
- Distributed by: SSR Cinemas
- Release date: 16 October 2026
- Running time: 166 minutes
- Country: India
- Language: Bengali
- Box office: ₹4.20 crore

DeSu7 is a 2026 Indian Bengali-language romantic action-thriller film written, produced, and directed by Dev, in his directorial debut. Film stars Dev himself alongside Subhashree Ganguly and Anirban Bhattacharya in the lead roles, with an ensemble supporting cast of Rajatava Dutta, Kanchan Mullick, Lokenath Dey, Parthasarathi Chakraborty, Priyanka Sarkar, Aparajita Auddy and Pradeep Bhattacharya.

The film marks Dev's 50th feature in the lead role. It was announced in January 2026 under the same title tentatively, as it pairs Dev and Subhashree for the seventh time. It also reunites Dev and Anirban for the fourth time. Principal Photography commenced in May 2026 in Kolkata and took place across several locations, including Mumbai and Ladakh, before wrapping by in August 2026. Music of the film is composed by Savvy and Nilayan Chatterjee, while Subhankar Bhar and MD. Kalam respectively handled its cinematography and editing.

DeSu 7 was theatrically released on 16 October 2026, coinciding with Durga Puja, alongside Bohurupi: The Golden Daku, The Eken: Kerala-e Kurukshetra, and Emperor vs Sarat Chandra.

== Cast ==
- Dev as Dev Aditya Roy (Dev), ex IPS officer, later undercover agent
- Subhashree Ganguly, as Dr. Subhashmita Chowdhury, Anujay's wife
- Anirban Bhattacharya in dual roles as
  - Anujay Chowdhury / Borda, MLA of Simantapur & Rana's twin brother
  - Ranjay Chowdhury (Rana) / Chhotda, Anujay's twin brother
- Rajatava Dutta as DIG Subrata Basu
- Kanchan Mullick as Helicopter
- Lokenath Dey as Heera Singh
- Priyanka Sarkar as Shampa
- Aparajita Auddy as Mashi
- Parthasarathi Chakraborty as Fuchka
- Shoaib Kabeer as Aditya, Dev's friend
- Pradeep Bhattacharya as Khalshi
- Rajeev Dey as Chhotu
- Idhika Paul in a cameo appearance for the item number "Ilish Chandana"
- Sushmita Roy as Subhashmita's friend

== Production ==
=== Development ===
The production was announced on 2 January 2026. It reunites Dev and Subhashree Ganguly, who had made six features together: Challenge (2009), Paran Jai Jaliya Re (2009), Romeo (2011), Khokababu (2012), Khoka 420 (2013), and Dhumketu (2025). Dhumketu was filmed in 2016 for an intended October release that year, but distribution delays kept it unreleased until 2025, so DeSu7 is their first new project together in ten years.

Dev works with Anirban Bhattacharya for the fourth time, after Arshinagar (2015), Golondaaj (2021), and Raghu Dakat (2025). It is Dev's eleventh film with Rajatava Dutta, after I Love You (2007), Challenge (2009), Paglu (2011), Paglu 2 (2012), Challenge 2 (2012), Khoka 420 (2013), Yoddha: The Warrior (2014), Hoichoi Unlimited (2018), Tonic (2021), and Byomkesh O Durgo Rahasya (2023). Bhattacharya and Ganguly appear together on screen for the first time; they were previously cast in the unproduced film Chor Police Dakat Babu.

Shoojit Rino Dutta was initially set to direct after working with Dev on Khadaan (2024). On 10 April 2026, Dev and Ganguly released a video confirming that Dev had taken over as director, his first time in the role. The same announcement confirmed Bhattacharya's casting, after industry reports of an informal work restriction against him following Raghu Dakat.

=== Marketing and filming ===
Advance ticket sales opened on 19 January 2026, ten months prior to release, following a Facebook Live broadcast by Dev and Ganguly.

Look tests for Bhattacharya were shared publicly on 15 May 2026. Principal photography commenced on 2 June 2026 following a launch ceremony the previous day. Filming for Bhattacharya's scenes began on 6 June. The primary promotional poster was released on 23 June 2026. The filming was wrapped up on 19 August 2026.

== Soundtrack ==
DeSu7

Studio album by Savvy, Nilayan Chatterjee, Rathijit Bhattacharjee, Ujjal Barman and Jeet Ganguly
- Released: 2026
- Recorded: 2025–26
- Genre: Feature film soundtrack
- Length: 29:27
- Label: Dev Music
- Producer: Dev Entertainment Ventures
External audio
- DeSu7 — Audio Jukebox on YouTube

The soundtrack album is composed by Savvy, Nilayan Chatterjee, Rathijit Bhattacharjee, Ujjal Barman, and Jeet Ganguli. The lyrics have been penned by Barish, Riddhi Barua, Nilayan Chatterjee, Prasen, Ujjal Barman, Subha Ka Muzik and Sougata Rudra.

Dev launched his independent record label, Dev Music, on 3 September 2026, with the release of the film's music. The principal background track of the film, "Fire", has been sung, composed and penned by Ujjal Barman.

The first single "Tor Sudhu Tor" was released on 7 September 2026. The second song "Nache Re Bangla" was released on 16 September 2026. The third song "Ilish Chandana" was dropped on 27 September 2026. The fourth single "Amar Sob Kichu Tei" was released on 4 October 2026. The fifth single "Chharkhar" was released on 15 October 2026. The rest of the songs were released along with the complete soundtrack album on 16 October 2026.

Track listing
No.	Title	Lyrics	Music	Singer(s)	Length
1.	"Tor Sudhu Tor"	Barish	Savvy	Rupak Tiary, June Das	3:47
2.	"Nache Re Bangla"	Riddhi Barua	Savvy	Ishan Mitra, Sohini Saha	3:28
3.	"Ilish Chandana"	Nilayan Chatterjee	Nilayan Chatterjee	Portia, Ishan Mitra, Nilayan Chatterjee	3:49
4.	"Amar Sob Kichu Tei"	Prasen	Savvy	Jeet Ganguli	4:46
5.	"Keu Karor Jonne Na"	Prasen	Savvy	Aarvan (Dev Arijit)	4:55
6.	"Chharkhar"	Ujjal Barman, Subha Ka Muzik	Ujjal Barman	Ishan Mitra, Mad Cash	2:28
7.	"Kemon Jala"	Sougata Rudra	Rathijit Bhattacharjee	Swwapan Adhikary	2:51
8.	"Tor Shudhu Tor - Reprise"	Barish	Savvy	Yuvann	3:23
Total length:					29:27

== Reception ==
=== Critical reception ===
Anurupa Chakraborty of The Indian Express rated the film 3.5/5 stars and wrote "It has to be said that Dev's journey as a director has been a success this time." She praised Dev-Subhasree's chemistry, the nationalistic dialogues, Anirban's seasoned performance in a negative shade and the performance of the supporting cast. A critic from Aaj Tak reviewed the film and applauded Dev's direction, Dev-Subhasree's chemistry, the usage of popular dialogues from their previous films to evoke nostalgia, the fast-paced script, the performance of the supporting cast, the background score, the cinematography, the editing, Idhika Paul's cameo and the soundtrack, but bemoaned the loose structure of the film.

Swati Chattopadhyay Bhowmik of Sangbad Pratidin reviewed the film and opined "DeSu7 is full of all the ingredients needed for a masala film. It is exactly what is meant by a potboiler — 100 percent pure and unadulterated entertainment." She appreciated the engaging screenplay, the dialogues, Dev's direction and performance, the background score, the music, the cinematography, the editing, Idhika Paul's cameo, the occasional comic scenes, Anirban's seasoned performance and the chemistry between Dev-Subhasree, but bemoaned the low screen time provided to the characters played by Priyanka Sarkar and Lokenath Dey, the weakly written background story for Dev's character and the lack of practicality in some action sequences.

A critic from Aaro Ananda rated the film 2.5/5 stars and wrote "This film does not hold the audience by arranging scene after scene. Rather, it tests their patience." They praised Dev's direction, the nostalgia-evoking songs used, Dev-Subhasree's chemistry, the title card and the music but criticized the lack of depth in the storyline, weak screenplay, weakly written character for Subhasree and the forced character arc for Anirban. A critic from The Telegraph reviewed the film and highlighted "A full-blooded Bengali commercial entertainer, the film brings together patriotism, romance, political undertones and high-octane action. Yet, it struggles to turn these ingredients into an engaging cinematic experience." They appreciated the punchlines, action sequences, romantic shots, Dev and Anirban's performance in their respective characters and the music but criticized the weak screenplay and the repetative call-backs to Dev-Subhasree's previous films.

Souvik Saha of Cine Kolkata rated the film 3/5 stars and opined "DeSu7 offers a nostalgic reunion with flashes of entertainment, but the chemistry of its stars cannot entirely compensate for the shortcomings of its story." He appreciated Dev's screen presence, the action sequences, Dev-Subhasree's chemistry, Anirban's nuanced performance, the ambition in Dev's direction, references from Dev-Subhasree's previous films, the dialogues, the music, the background score and the cinematography but criticised the commercial film characterisation, weak character development for Dev's character, lack of enough importance of Subhasree's character, poor execution, weak screenplay, dramatic writing and the weakly developed political elements.
