= West Bengal Film Journalists' Association Award for Best Actress =

Annual Indian film award

WBFJA for Best Actress
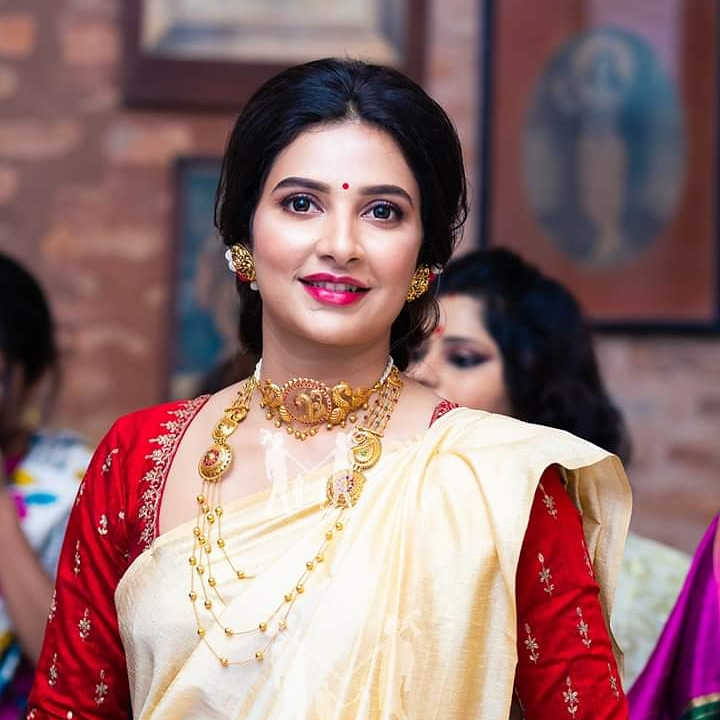
- The 2026 recipient: Subhashree Ganguly
- Awarded for: Best Performance by an Actress in a Leading Role
- Country: India
- Presented by: West Bengal Film Journalists' Association
- Final award: 2026
- Most Recent Winner: Subhashree Ganguly for Grihapravesh

The West Bengal Film Journalists' Association Award for Best Actress in a Leading Role is given yearly by WBFJA as a part of its annual West Bengal Film Journalists' Association Awards for Bengali films. It recognise the female performer who has delivered an outstanding performance in a leading role in a film released in the previous year.

== Superlatives ==
Category	Name	Superlative
Most awards	Rituparna Sengupta; Subhashree Ganguly; Jaya Ahsan	3 Awards; 2 Awards; 2 Awards
Most Nominated	Swastika Mukherjee; Rituparna Sengupta	5 Nominations

== Winners and Nominees ==
Year (Note: Refers to the year in which the ceremony was held.)	Photos of winners	Actor	Role(s)	Film
2017 (1st)		Rituparna Sengupta ‡	Sudipa Sen	Praktan
2017 (1st)		Gargi Roy Chowdhury	Dr. Paramita Sen	Benche Thakar Gaan
2017 (1st)		Paoli Dam	Antara Chaktabarty / Ashlesha / Damayanti	Khawto
2017 (1st)		Swastika Mukherjee	Jaya Sarkar	Shaheb Bibi Golaam
2018 (2nd)		Jaya Ahsan ‡	Padma Haldar	Bishorjan
2018 (2nd)		Arpita Chatterjee	Tithi Chatterjee	Chitrokar
2018 (2nd)		Paoli Dam	Devi	Devi
2018 (2nd)		Sohini Sarkar	Durga / Chainaa	Durga Sohay
2018 (2nd)		Swastika Mukherjee	Tuki	Asamapto
2019 (3rd)	–	Rituparna Sengupta ‡	Shrimati Sen	Drishtikone
2019 (3rd)	–	Sudipta Chakraborty ‡	Bindiya	Uronchondi
2019 (3rd)	–	Koel Mallick	Lavanya	Ghare & Baire
2019 (3rd)	–	Jaya Seal	Fathima Ali	Alifa
2019 (3rd)	–	Tanuja	Upama Mukherjee	Shonar Pahar
2020 (4th)		Subhashree Ganguly ‡	Mehul Bose	Parineeta
2020 (4th)		Anashua Majumdar	Shova Rani Mukherjee	Mukherjee Dar Bou
2020 (4th)		Koneenica Banerjee	Aditi Mukherjee	Mukherjee Dar Bou
2020 (4th)		Jaya Ahsan	Sayani Sen	Robibaar
2020 (4th)		Paoli Dam	Phooli	Sanjhbati
2020 (4th)		Raima Sen	Ira Gupta	Tarikh
2021-22 (5th)		Aparajita Auddy ‡	Mishti Mukherjee	Cheeni
2021-22 (5th)		Arpita Chatterjee	Mrs. Saathi	Abyakto
2021-22 (5th)		Rituparna Sengupta	Nandini	The Parcel
2021-22 (5th)		Rukmini Maitra	Rumi M. Saha	Switzerland
2021-22 (5th)		Swastika Mukherjee	Dolly Bagri	Guldasta
2021-22 (5th)		Jaya Ahsan ‡	Srabani Barua	Binisutoy
2021-22 (5th)		Basabdatta Chatterjee	Ms. Mou	Tokhon Kuasa Chilo
2021-22 (5th)		Sauraseni Maitra	Sheela Chatterjee	Ekannoborti
2023 (6th)		Gargi Roy Chowdhury ‡	Mahananda G. Bhattacharya / Mahananda Devi	Mahananda
2023 (6th)		Arpita Chatterjee	Aarja	Hridpindo
2023 (6th)		Sohini Sarkar	Ms. Mishtu	Ananta: The Eternal
2023 (6th)		Subhashree Ganguly	Poulami Chatterjee	Boudi Canteen
2023 (6th)		Swastika Mukherjee	Shrimati	Shrimati
2024 (7th)		Churni Ganguly ‡	Subhra Chatterjee	Ardhangini
2024 (7th)		Swastika Mukherjee ‡	Mandira Biswas	Shibpur
2024 (7th)		Arunima Ghosh	Aruna / Rooni	Maayakumari
2024 (7th)		Gargi Roy Chowdhury	Medha Roy	Shesh Pata
2024 (7th)		Rituparna Sengupta	Maayakumari	Maayakumari
2025 (8th)		Rituparna Sengupta ‡	Parna Majumdar	Ajogyo
2025 (8th)		Koushani Mukherjee	Jhimli Pramanik	Bohurupi
2025 (8th)		Mamata Shankar	Alokananda "Aloka"	Bijoyar Pore
2025 (8th)		Mimi Chakraborty	Aditi Mitra	Alaap
2025 (8th)		Rukmini Maitra	Ishaa Sen/Nisha	Boomerang
2026 (9th)		Subhashree Ganguly	Titli Ray	Grihapravesh
2026 (9th)		Koel Mallick	Aparna Ghoshal	Sharthopor
2026 (9th)		Koushani Mukherjee	Poorna Aich	Killbill Society
2026 (9th)		Paoli Dam	Mitra Roy	Chhaad
2026 (9th)		Sreelekha Mitra	Ela	Mayanagar

== See also ==
- West Bengal Film Journalists' Association Award for Best Actor
- West Bengal Film Journalists' Association Awards
- Cinema of India
