= Filmfare Award Bangla for Best Actress =

Indian film award

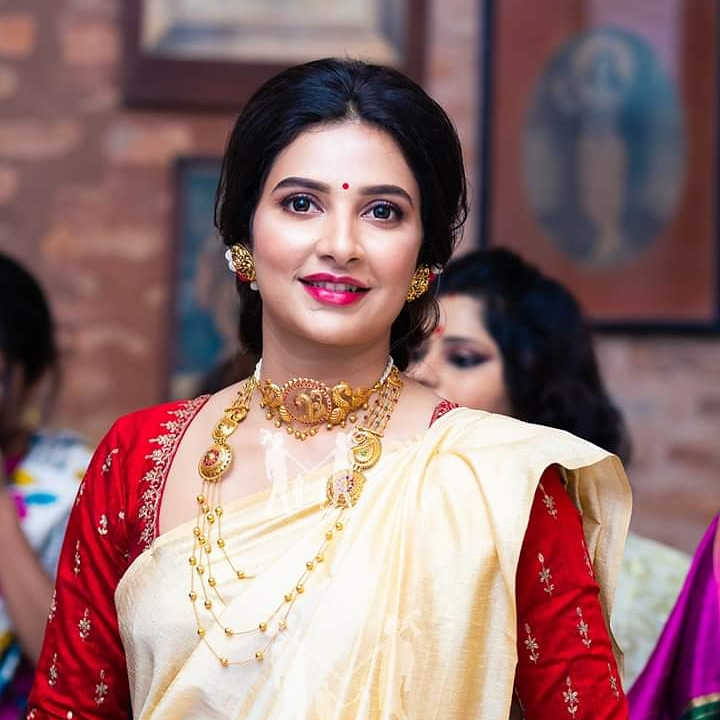
- The current recipient: Subhashree Ganguly
- Awarded for: Best Performance by an Actress in a Leading Role
- Country: India
- Presented by: Filmfare
- First award: Konkona Sen Sharma, Goynar Baksho (2014)
- Currently held by: Subhashree Ganguly, Babli (2025)
- Website: Filmfare Awards Bangla

The Filmfare Award Bangla for Best Actress is an award, which is presented annually at the Filmfare Awards Bangla to an actress via a jury; it is given by Filmfare for Bengali films.

== Superlatives ==
Superlative	Actress	Record
Most awards	Swastika Mukherjee	3
Most nominations	Swastika Mukherjee	5
Most nominations without ever winning	Rituparna Sengupta; Rukmini Maitra	3
Oldest winner	Churni Ganguly (2024)	57
Oldest nominee	Churni Ganguly (2024)	57
Youngest winner	Subhashree Ganguly (2021)	30
Youngest nominee	Sohini Sarkar (2014)	26

=== Most wins ===
Winner	Number of wins	Years
Swastika Mukherjee	3	2017, 2021, 2023
Subhashree Ganguly	2	2021, 2025
Jaya Ahsan	2	2018, 2022
Konkona Sen Sharma	1	2014
Churni Ganguly	1	2024

=== Most nominations ===
Singer	Number of Nominations	Number of wins
Swastika Mukherjee	5	3
Jaya Ahsan	4	2
Subhashree Ganguly	3	2
Rituparna Sengupta	3	0
Koel Mallick	3	0
Rukmini Mitra	3	0
Ishaa Saha	2	0
Paoli Dam	2	0

== List of winners ==
Table key
‡	Indicates the winner
†	Indicates a posthumous winner

=== 2010s ===
Year	Photos of winners	Actress	Role(s)	Film
2014 (1st)		Konkona Sen Sharma ‡	Somalata Mitra	Goynar Baksho
2014 (1st)		Ananya Chatterjee	Durga Bagchi	Meghe Dhakha Tara
2014 (1st)		Arpita Chatterjee	Aloka	Satyanweshi
2014 (1st)		Rituparna Sengupta	Rumi K. Guha	Alik Sukh
2014 (1st)		Sohini Sarkar	Miss Doyel Mitra	Phoring
2015	NO CEREMONY			
2016	NO CEREMONY			
2017 (2nd)		Swastika Mukherjee ‡	Jaya Sarkar	Shaheb Bibi Golaam
2017 (2nd)		Gargi Roychowdhury	Dr. Paramita Sen	Benche Thakar Gaan
2017 (2nd)		Jaya Ahsan	Shivangi B. Ray	Eagoler Chokh
2017 (2nd)		Paoli Dam	Antara / Damayanti	Khawto
2017 (2nd)		Raima Sen	Nanda Chaudhury	Monchora
2017 (2nd)		Rituparna Sengupta	Sudipa M. Sen	Praktan
2018 (3rd)		Jaya Ahsan ‡	Padma Haldar	Bishorjan
2018 (3rd)		Ishaa Saha	Srabani 'Shaon' Sen	Projapoti Biskut
2018 (3rd)		Rukmini Maitra	Kirti Sachdev	Cockpit
2018 (3rd)		Sohini Sarkar	Rayona Sarkar	Bibaho Diaries
2018 (3rd)		Swastika Mukherjee	Tuki	Asamapto

=== 2020s ===
Year	Photos of winners	Actress	Role(s)	Film
2021 (4th)		Subhashree Ganguly ‡	Mehul Bose	Parineeta
2021 (4th)		Swastika Mukherjee ‡	Kamalini Guha	Shah Jahan Regency
2021 (4th)		Koel Mallick	Mitin Masi	Mitin Mashi
2021 (4th)		Paoli Dam	Preetha A. Mullick	Konttho
2021 (4th)		Rituparna Sengupta	Basundhara Ganguly	Ahaa Re...
2022 (5th)		Jaya Ahsan ‡	Srabani Barua	Binisutoy
2022 (5th)		Aparajita Adhya	Malini Chatterjee	Ekannoborti
2022 (5th)		Koel Mallick	RJ Swarnaja	Rawkto Rawhoshyo
2022 (5th)		Ritabhari	Shabari Chakrabarty	Brahma Janen Gopon Kommoti
2022 (5th)		Rukmini Maitra	Rumi Mitra Saha	Switzerland
2023 (6th)		Swastika Mukherjee ‡	Shrimati	Shrimati
2023 (6th)		Ditipriya Roy	Satabdi Mondal (Buri)	Aay Khuku Aay
2023 (6th)		Gargi Roy Chowdhury	Mahananda Bhattacharya	Mahananda
2023 (6th)		Ishaa Saha	Teesta 'Tushi' Sen	Sahobashe
2023 (6th)		Rukmini Maitra	Rohini Sen	Kishmish
2023 (6th)		Subhashree Ganguly	Paulami Chatterjee	Boudi Canteen
2024 (7th)		Churni Ganguly ‡	Shubhra Chatterjee	Ardhangini
2024 (7th)		Jaya Ahsan	Moitreyee Ghatak	Dawshom Awbotaar
2024 (7th)		Koel Mallick	Mitin Mashi	Jongole Mitin Mashi
2024 (7th)		Ritabhari	Phoollari K. Bhaduri	Fatafati
2024 (7th)		Solanki Roy	RJ Anindita	Shohorer Ushnotomo Din E
2024 (7th)		Swastika Mukherjee	Mandira Biswas	Shibpur
2025 (8th)		Subhashree Ganguly ‡	Babli (Damayanti)	Babli
2025 (8th)		Aparajita Adhya	Shritama Dutta Sharma	Eta Amader Golpo
2025 (8th)		Jaya Ahsan	Banalata	Bhootpori
2025 (8th)		Koushani Mukherjee	Jhimli Pramanik	Bohurupi
2025 (8th)		Oindrila Sen	SI Muskan	Mirza: Part 1 - Joker
2025 (8th)		Rituparna Sengupta	Parna Majumdar	Ajogyo
