= Desu =

Desu or DESU may refer to:

- Desu (Japanese: です), the polite form of the Japanese copula often translated as "to be"
  - Suiseiseki, a character from the anime and manga series Rozen Maiden whose overusage and unusual pronunciation of the copula became an early Internet meme
- DeSu7, an upcoming Bengali romantic action drama film
- Adalbert Deșu (Béla Dezső, 1909–1937), a Romanian football striker
- Delaware State University, sometimes abbreviated as DESU
- Diplôme d'études supérieures universitaires (DESU), a French academic grade
