= Romeo (2011 film) =

2011 film by Sujit Mondal

- Theatrical release poster
- Directed by: Sujit Mondal
- Written by: N. K. Salil; Kishore Kumar Pardasani
- Produced by: Shree Venkatesh Films
- Starring: Dev; Subhashree; Sabyasachi Chakrabarty; Laboni Sarkar; Partha Sarathi Deb; Kaushik Banerjee
- Cinematography: Kumud Verma
- Edited by: Rabi Ranjan Moitra
- Music by: Jeet Gannguli
- Production company: Shree Venkatesh Films
- Release date: 4 November 2011
- Running time: 156:05 minutes
- Country: India
- Language: Bengali

Romeo is a 2011 Bengali-language romantic comedy film directed by Sujit Mondal. Produced by Shrikant Mohta under the banner of Shree Venkatesh Films, it stars Dev and Subhashree in lead roles. It is the third film where Dev and Subhashree worked together after Challenge and Paran Jai Jaliya Re. The film was released on 4 November 2011 to mixed reviews. It is an official remake of the Telugu blockbuster movie Konchem Ishtam Konchem Kashtam.

== Plot ==
This story is set in the backdrop of a village where Pooja grows under the shade of her doting father Chatterjee who takes care of everything for her and she is equally attached to him. She comes to Kolkata for her further studies and stays at her uncle Dibakar's house. There, her cousin Swati has a group of friends and one among them is the happy and playful Siddhartha alias Siddhu.

Siddhu is a big Casanova among girls and though he always has a smile on his face, there is a sad past as his mother Nandini is living separately from his father Aviraj Roy. Both of Siddhu's parents had a love marriage. Eventually, both Siddhu and Pooja fall in love and the time comes for Siddhu to ask for Pooja's hand in marriage. Mr. Chatterjee says that if Siddhu can unite his parents and get them together, he would be willing to accept the proposal.

From then on start the efforts and trials of both Siddhu and Pooja to get Aviraj and Nandini together. One night, when Aviraj is driving Siddhu to his mother's home, they talk about when his parents separated. His father understands his feelings and what he's trying to say, and his father answers "that he couldn't have done anything, his mother just left him." To this Siddhu answers, "No, you should have gone after her. You should have never let her go." Even after this talk with Aviraj, Pooja and Siddhu have many failures, but eventually Siddhu reunites his parents and Pooja's father, Chatterjee, also unites the other lovers, Pooja and Siddhu.

== Cast ==
- Dev as Siddharth Roy
- Subhashree as Pooja Chatterjee
- Sabyasachi Chakrabarty as Aviraj Roy
- Laboni Sarkar as Nandini Roy
- Biswajit Chakraborty as Dibakar (special appearance)
- Kaushik Banerjee as Mr. Chatterjee, Pooja's father
- Parthasarathi Chakraborty as Ratan, Sidhu's friend

== Production ==
Four of the songs in the film were shot across different locations in Africa. Although the director initially decided to shoot in London, the shooting spot was later changed as London would look similar to already seen places like Italy or Venice. Finally, two of the songs were shot in Sun City and Cape Town in South Africa and two others in Namibia. The song "Lady Killer Romeo" was made on a budget of ₹50 lakhs and it was the most expensive Bengali movie song at its time.

== Soundtrack ==
Romeo

Soundtrack album by Jeet Gannguli
- Released: 4 November 2011
- Recorded: Purple Haze & Purple Rain Studios
- Genre: Feature film soundtrack
- Language: Bengali
- Label: SVF

Jeet Gannguli chronology
Paglu (2011)	Romeo (2011)	System (2011)

Singles from Romeo
- 1. "Mala Re" Released: 15 Oct 2011; 2. "Lady Killer Romeo" Released: 16 Oct 2011; 3. "Ghumghum Ei Chokhe" Released: 21 Oct 2011; 4. "Mon Toke Dilam" Released: 27 Oct 2011; 5. "Eta Ki Bhul" Released: 1 Nov 2011; 6. "Jaye Pakhi Urey" Released: 5 Nov 2011

The music of the film has been composed by Jeet Gannguli. The lyrics has been written by Priyo Chattopadhyay, Chandrani Gannguli and Prasen.

No.	Title	Lyrics	Artist(s)	Length
1.	"Lady Killer Romeo"	Priyo Chattopadhyay	Jeet Gannguli, Akriti Kakkar	3:50
2.	"Eta Ki Bhul"	Prasen	Shaan, Monali Thakur	4:47
3.	"Mala Re"	Priyo Chattopadhyay	Jeet Gannguli	4:29
4.	"Ghumghum Ei Chokhe"	Chandrani Gannguli	Sonu Nigam, Shreya Ghoshal	4:24
5.	"Mon Toke Dilam"	Priyo Chattopadhyay	Zubeen Garg	3:50
6.	"Jaye Pakhi Urey"	Priyo Chattopadhyay	Rana Mazumdar	4:24

== Reception ==
=== Critical reception ===
A critic from The Times of India rated the film 3/5 stars and wrote "Sujit Mondal tries to hammer a point — love is responsibility, family is of utmost importance. You’ve seen him deal with the baddies, now, don’t miss out the dishy dude in his romantic avatar." He praised Ganguli's music, Yadav's choreography and the acting of the supporting cast but criticised the plot for being borderline predictable.
