= Shontaan =

2024 Indian Bengali legal drama film

- Directed by: Raj Chakraborty
- Screenplay by: Sreejib; Additional screenplay: Anuja Chattopadhyay; Soumyabrata Rakshit (also dialogues)
- Story by: Sreejib
- Produced by: SVF
- Starring: Mithun Chakraborty; Anashua Majumdar; Ritwick Chakraborty; Subhashree Ganguly; Kharaj Mukherjee
- Cinematography: Manas Ganguly
- Edited by: MD. Kalam
- Music by: Songs: Jeet Ganguli; Background score: Amit Chaterjee
- Distributed by: SVF
- Release date: 20 December 2024
- Running time: 143 minutes
- Country: India
- Language: Bengali
- Box office: ₹10 crore

Shontaan (Bengali pronunciation: [ʃon.tan]; transl. Offspring) is a 2024 Indian Bengali-language action-legal drama film directed by Raj Chakraborty. Produced by Shrikant Mohta and Mahendra Soni under the banner of Shree Venkatesh Films, the film stars Mithun Chakraborty, Ritwick Chakraborty and Anashua Majumdar in lead roles, while Sohini Sengupta, Biswajit Chakraborty and Ahona Dutta play other pivotal roles, with Kharaj Mukherjee and Subhashree Ganguly in extended appearances. It revolves around a poignant courtroom battle between Saradindu and his self-centric son Indranil.

Jeet Ganguli composed the music of the film. Manas Ganguly is the director of photography and MD. Kalam is the editor. It released in the theatres on 20 December 2024 on the eve of Christmas to positive reviews from the audience and critics alike. Grossing over ₹10.02 crore, it ran in the theaters for over 100 days and emerged as a superhit at the box office.

== Plot ==
The film depicts the tussles and difficulties in the troubled relationship between a son and his aged, ailing parents. Saradindu is an old man, battered down and tired from the daily struggles of life. He lives with his wife Mala who suffers from severe arthritis. Their son Indranil is a self-centric and selfish man who doesn't care about his parents. He works in a multinational company. With a high income, he lives a life of luxury with his wife Ria, and his son Pablo, away from his parents. He travels in a Mercedes, parties frequently with his colleagues, goes on international holidays, but is reluctant to provide time for his parents or to pay for his ailing mother's knee surgery when her health deteriorates.

When Saradindu goes to Indranil to ask for money for Mala's surgery, he humiliates his father and denies to give any financial assistance. He declares that he has many other important expenses and can't give money for his mother's surgery. In profound agony and rage, Saradindu files a case against his son in court, on the grounds of ill treatment and neglect of old parents. Indrani fights for Saradindu against Indranil's lawyer, Bikash Munsi.

But things take a turn when Mala, torn between her moralities and her responsibilities as a mother and a wife, chooses to prioritize her motherhood over her principles. She asks her husband to withdraw the case against her son despite all their suffering because she can't see her son getting hurt. But Saradindu insists on sticking by his decision in order to teach a lesson to his son for taking his parents for granted. The story further illustrates the emotional drama between Indranil and his old, helpless parents, which unfolds inside and outside the courtroom. Tragedy intensifies when the turmoil takes a toll on Mala's health and she passes away. Although late, Indranil realises his mistakes at the end and Saradindu forgives him because he had promised so to his late wife.

== Cast ==
- Mithun Chakraborty as Saradindu Bose
- Ritwick Chakraborty as Indranil "Babui" Bose, Saradindu and Mala's son
- Anashua Majumdar as Meghomala "Mala" Bose, Saradindu's wife
- Subhashree Ganguly as Indrani Sen, Saradindu's lawyer
- Kharaj Mukherjee as Bikash Munshi, Indranil's lawyer
- Sohini Sengupta as Lata, Mala's domestic help
- Biswajit Chakraborty as Amitava, Saradindu's friend
- Ahana Dutta as Ria Bose, Indranil's wife

== Production ==
=== Announcement ===
The first look poster was revealed on 31 October 2024, on the occasion of Kali Puja. The trailer was unveiled on 1 November 2024.

=== Marketing ===
As a part of the promotions, the makers visited some old age homes to speak to them about their relationship with their children and how they ended up there. The premiere was on 17 December 2024.

== Music ==
Shontaan

Soundtrack album by Jeet Gannguli
- Released: December 2024
- Recorded: 2024
- Studios: Playhead Studio; VM Studio
- Genre: Film soundtrack
- Length: 10:40
- Language: Bengali
- Label: SVF

The music of the film has been composed by Jeet Ganguli. The lyrics have been penned by Priyo Chattopadhyay and Anindya Chatterjee.

The first song "Thakur Thakbe Kotokkhon" was released on 16 November 2024. The second single "Tomar Akashey" was released on 1 December 2024. The third and the last song "Pablo" was released along with the full album.

Track listing
No.	Title	Lyrics	Singer(s)	Length
1.	"Thakur Thakbe Kotokkhon"	Priyo Chattopadhyay	Amit Kumar, Jeet Gannguli	4:12
2.	"Tomar Akashey"	Anindya Chatterjee	Vishal Mishra	3:26
3.	"Pablo"	Anindya Chatterjee	Abhijeet Bhattacharya	3:02
Total length:				10:40

== Release ==
=== Theatrical ===
Initially scheduled to release during Durga Puja festivities in 2024, it was delayed to release in the theatres on 20 December 2024.

=== Home media ===
Shontaan is streaming on the Bengali OTT platform Hoichoi.

== Reception ==
Poorna Banerjee of The Times of India rated the film 3.5/5 stars and wrote "Shontaan is a good film with a strong moral standpoint that definitely leaves the audience with a message. It draws out quite long and could have been slightly tighter during the second half, but solid moments of emotional drama compensate for that." She praised the music, background score and the performance of the whole cast, specially Mithun and Anashua.

Agnivo Niyogi of The Telegraph reviewed the film and noted "With Shontaan, Raj Chakrabarty delivers a family drama that stays with you even after you have left the hall. It takes the well-worn premise of a parent suing their child over charges of neglect but packs in all the right emotions to tug at the heartstrings." Although he mentioned the first half to be draggy and melodramatic with a rushed climax and preachy tone, he praised the acting of the whole cast, specially Mithun, Anashua, Ritwick and Subhashree.

Ranita Goswami of the Hindustan Times rated the film 4 out of 5 stars and opined "Even though the film is based on an old story palette, Raj's storytelling accompanied by the actors' remarkable acting makes this film a family entertainer." She particularly applauded Mithun's seasoned acting besides praising Anashua, Kharaj, Subhashree and Ritwick for their acting skills.

Akash Misra of Sangbad Pratidin reviewed the film and wrote "The film is a mirror to the reality of our present society. Even after coming out from the theatres after all the tears shedding, it will leave a deep longing impact on the viewers." He also praised the acting acumen of Mithun and Ritwick.

Amay Deb Roy of Anandabazar Patrika rated the film 8/10 stars and highlighted "Although the film is based on the old "chanch" of emotional drift and family drama, Raj Chakroborty's direction and storytelling is what that makes this simple story look astounding." He also praised Mithun, Anushua, Ritwick, Subhashree and Kharaj for their seamless acting.

Snigdha Dey of Aajkal reviewed the film and opined "In an unequal fight between the father and his son, "Shontaan" will have a special place in the inner core of our heart. This film will surely force all the parents and children to rethink their relationship and the bond which they share." Besides, she praised Mithun, Ritwick and Anashua for their intensive emotional portrayal and also applauded Subhashree for playing a different role.

== Awards ==
Year	Award	Category	Artist
2025	Anandalok Puraskar	Anandalok Best Actress Award	Subhashree Ganguly
2025	Anandalok Puraskar	Best Actor in Negative Role	Ritwick Chakraborty
2025	Anandalok Puraskar	Best Director	Raj Chakraborty
