= Chalbaaz =

2018 Indian Bengali film by Joydip Mukherjee

- Official Poster
- Directed by: Joydip Mukherjee
- Written by: Harish Shankar
- Screenplay by: Pele Bhattacharya
- Produced by: Ashok Dhanuka; Himanshu Dhanuka
- Starring: Shakib Khan; Subhashree; Ashish Vidyarthi; Rajatabha Dutta
- Cinematography: Gargay Trivedi
- Edited by: Ravi Ranjan Maitra
- Music by: Savvy
- Production company: Eskay Movies
- Distributed by: Eskay Movies
- Release date: 20 April 2018
- Running time: 152 minutes
- Country: India
- Language: Bengali

Chalbaaz (transl. Trickster) is a 2018 Indian Bengali action comedy film directed by Joydip Mukherjee. The film stars Bangladeshi Superstar Shakib Khan and Subhashree in the lead roles. The cast also includes Rajatabha Dutta, Kharaj Mukherjee, Syed Hasan Imam, Atul Sharma and Ashish Vidyarthi. The film is produced by OT Ltd Productions The film is a remake of 2015 Telugu movie Subramanyam for Sale. The film was released in India on 20 April 2018. And Released in Bangladesh on 27 April 2018. The film received generally positive reviews from critics. It topped the box office in its opening week.

The film was also the third collaboration between Shakib Khan and Joydeep Mukherjee pair after huge success of the films Shikari and Nabab and the third collaboration between Shakib Khan and Eskay Movies, second time pairing with Shakib-Subhashree and director Joydeep Mukherjee with Subhashree Ganguly after successful Nabab.

== Plot ==
Raja (Shakib Khan) is a money minded youth who goes to the UK to earn big bucks. One fine day, he comes across Srijata (Subhashree) who ditches her family for her long time boyfriend. As time passes by, Srijata gets cheated on by her boyfriend big time and is left stranded in London. A twist in the tale arises when Srijata requests Raja to come along with her to Kolkata to clear the chaos which was created by her elopement. What will Raja do now? That forms the rest of the story.

== Cast ==
- Shakib Khan as Raja Chowdhury
- Subhashree as Srijata
- Ashish Vidyarthi as Adinath Mallick, Srijata's paternal uncle; Who is currently the head of the Mallick family
- Rajatava Dutta as Bhojohori Manna / Bhoja Da, Raja's assistant; chef of Indian Standard Institute (currently known as Bureau of Indian Standards)
- Shantilal Mukherjee - Pappu Mallick, Mallick family's enemy
- Sagnik Chatterjee as Bikram, Priya's brother; who went to keep his father's word, became desperate to marry his sister to Raja
- Joydip Mukherjee as Rajshekhar Dutt, Vinay's father and competition organiser; Later he came to India from UK to marry his son to Sunita, the youngest daughter of the Mallick family.
- Subrata as Thakurbabu; Raja's father
- Rebeka Rouf as Raja's step mother
- Shiba Shanu as Tota, Vikram's gang
- Mahamudul Islam Mithu
- Rajdeep Ghosh
- Shikha Khan Mou as Aruna Mallick, Adinath Mallick's wife
- Shahed Ali
- Jadu Azad
- Honey Bafna
- Amit Ganguly
- Jayanta Hore
- Panchanan Ghatak
- Manosi Sengupta as Priya, Vikram's sister and Raja's fiańcee
- Rumpa
- Esha Bhattacharjee
- Momo Shiuly
- Reshma
- Priyanti Gomes
- Papiya
- Dhiman
- Mridul Sen
- Atul Sharma as Competition Judge
- Rene Costa as Airport Security
- Kumud Pant as Chef
- Charlotte Dunnico as Marie
- Mousumi Saha
- Tatiana Zarubova as Competition Participant

== Soundtrack ==
The soundtrack of Chalbaaz is composed by Savvy, while lyrics of the film songs are penned by Priyo Chattopadhyay. The first song from the movie, the title song "Chalbaaz", is sung by Shadaab Hashmi. The Title song "Chalbaaz" was released as a promotional single on 8 March 2018. the Video Song "Aish Kori" was released on YouTube on 15 March 2018 and was well received by Critics and Audiences. The Third Video Song "Projapoti Mon" was released on YouTube on 23 March 2018 and Tor Premer Brishtite sung by Armaan Malik and Madhubanti Bagchi Released on 29 March 2018.

Chalbaaz

Soundtrack album by Savvy
- Released: 2018
- Genre: Film soundtrack
- Length: 15:39
- Label: Eskay Movies

Savvy chronology
Bizli (2018)	Chalbaaz (2018)	Sultan: The Saviour (2018)

Track listing
No.	Title	Lyrics	Music	Artist(s)	Length
1.	"Chalbaaz (Title Song)"	Priyo Chattopadhyay	Savvy	Shadaab Hashmi	4:00
2.	"Aish Kori"	Savvy	Savvy	Savvy, Madhubanti Bagchi	3:33
3.	"Projapoti Mon"	Priyo Chattaopadhyay	Savvy	Madhushree	4:16
4.	"Tor Premer Brishtite"	Anyaman	Savvy	Armaan Malik, Madhubanti Bagchi	3:50
Total length:					15:39
