= Rangbaz (2017 film) =

2017 film by Shamim Ahamed Roni

- Theatrical First Look
- Bengali: রংবাজ
- Directed by: Abdul Mannan & Shamim Ahamed Roni
- Written by: Abdullah Zahir Babu
- Screenplay by: Shamim Ahamed Roni
- Story by: Abdullah Zahir Babu
- Produced by: Shrikant Mohta; Mahendra Soni
- Starring: Shakib Khan; Shabnom Bubly; Amit Hasan; Shiba Shanu
- Edited by: Towhid Hossain Chowdhury
- Music by: Savvy; Dabbu
- Production companies: SVF Entertainment; Ruprong Films Limited
- Distributed by: Ruprong Films Limited (Bangladesh)
- Release date: 2 September 2017
- Country: Bangladesh
- Language: Bengali

Rangbaz (Bengali: রংবাজ) is a 2017 Bangladeshi gangster film directed by Shamim Ahamed Roni and Abdul Mannan. It was produced by Shrikant Mohta and Mahendra Soni under the banners of SVF Entertainment and Ruprong Films Limited. The film marks SVF Entertainment's first Bangladeshi venture and it is also the first film of SVF Entertainment to be released only in Bangladesh. The film stars Shakib Khan and features Shabnom Bubly as his love interest. It also features Rajatava Dutta, Amit Hasan, Chikon Ali, and Sadek Bachchu in supporting roles. The film was released on 2 September 2017, to coincide with Eid al-Adha in Bangladesh.

The film is Shakib Khan's first collaboration with SVF Entertainment and also the third collaboration between Khan and Bubly, who have previously starred together in the 2016 films Bossgiri and Shooter.

== Cast ==
- Shakib Khan as Sallu a.k.a. Rangbaz
- Shabnom Bubly as Bubly
- Amit Hasan as Amit Chowdhury
- Nuton as Noorjahan / Sallu's mother
- Chikon Ali as Sallu's gang member
- Sadek Bachchu as Chachu
- Kazi Hayat as Dr. Shaab
- Shiba Shanu as Shahadat Juardar
- Jadu Azad
- Ratan
- Rajea Sultana Liana Lia

== Production ==
=== Filming ===
The shooting schedule of Rangbaz commenced on 18 April 2017. The first phase of the film was shot in a 10-day schedule and entirely filmed in Pabna. The second phase of the filming took place in Dhaka. The last phase was filmed in Dhaka and Pabna, and lasted 30-days. The music of the film was shot at various locations in Switzerland and Italy. A romantic track sequence was shot at Zermatt, Kanton Wallis, Switzerland while other sequences were shot at Venice, Italy and A romantic track sequence was shot at Kolkata film city in East Bengal. The entire film was shot on a 45-day schedule.

== Soundtrack ==
Rangbaz

Soundtrack album by Dabbu & Savvy
- Released: 2017
- Genre: Soundtrack
- Language: Bengali
- Label: Unlimited Audio Video
- Producer: Dabbu; Savvy

Dabbu chronology
Amar Aponjon (2017)	Rangbaz (2017)	Network (2017)

Savvy chronology
Nabab (2017)	Rangbaz (2017)	Noor Jahaan (2017)

The soundtrack for the film is composed by Savvy and Dabbu. The music video of the first track from the soundtrack, "Ghum Amar", was released on YouTube on 20 August. The second song from the album, "Rangbaz", is the title track of the album. The song's music video was released on YouTube on 24 August. The music video of the third song, "Rim Jhim", released on 27 August and the music video of the fourth song, "Tui Chad Eider", released on 29 August.

=== Track listing ===
No.	Title	Lyrics	Music	Singer (s)	Length
1.	"Ghum Amar"	Prasen	Savvy	Jubin Nautiyal, Prashmita Paul	4:35
2.	"Rangbaz"	Satrujit Dasgupta	Dabbu	Satrujit	2:37
3.	"Rim Jhim"	Priyo Chatterjee	Dabbu	Mohammed Irfan, Antara Mitra	4:12
4.	"Tui Chad Eider"	Savvy	Savvy	Savvy, Nandini Dev	4:12
