= Khokababu =

2012 Indian Bengali action comedy film

- Theatrical poster
- Directed by: D. Shankar Aiyya
- Written by: Shayak Ganguly
- Produced by: Ashok Dhanuka; Eskay Movies
- Starring: Dev; Subhashree; Ferdous; Laboni Sarkar; Biswajit Chakraborty; Locket Chatterjee; Ashish Vidyarthi; Biplab Chatterjee; Subhasish Mukherjee
- Cinematography: Sirsha Ray
- Edited by: Mohammad Kalam Khan, Saikat Sengupta
- Music by: Rishi Chanda
- Distributed by: Eskay Movies
- Release date: 13 January 2012
- Running time: 158 minutes
- Country: India
- Language: Bengali
- Budget: ₹5.75 crore

Khokababu is an Indian Bengali action comedy film directed by Shankar Aiyya. The film stars Dev, Subhashree, Ferdous, and Laboni Sarkar in the lead roles.It is a remake of telugu movie Dhee. The film was released in the theatres on 13 January 2012. It served as the maiden installment of the Khokababu series. Made on a budget of ₹5.75 crore, it emerged a box office success.

== Synopsis ==
The film is about Abir Roy a.k.a. Khoka/Khokababu who is a cool and clever guy. Shankar Das a.k.a. Bhaiji is a well-known don in his territory whom everybody fears and obeys. Khoka joins Bhaiji's circle as an accountant where he has a wacky senior Khanra Babu. Khoka with his super wit starts to obtain every luxury that a perfect office should have and starts to hoax Bhaiji. Problems occur when Khoka falls in love with Bhaiji's sister Pooja. Anyone who even looks in her direction is simply dealt with in the cruelest way possible. Khoka somehow manages to win over Pooja and also gains the complete trust of Bhaiji by changing the system in which his business operates. Bhaiji asks him to look after Pooja as he considers his other employees to be incapable. Khoka and Pooja fall in love with each other and even get secretly married. She even goes to his house to stay for 3 days as Bhaiji's rival Ballu is after her life. Bhaiji is completely unaware of Khoka and Pooja's relationship; however, he does come to know about it later.

== Cast ==
- Dev as Abir a.k.a. Khoka/ Khokababu
- Subhashree as Pooja
- Ferdous as Shankar Das a.k.a. Bhaiji
- Laboni Sarkar as Khoka's mother
- Tathoi Deb as Khoka's sister
- Biswajit Chakraborty as Khoka's father
- Locket Chatterjee as Bhaiji's wife
- Ashish Vidyarthi as Ballu
- Biplab Chattopadhyay as Jatin Prasad
- Subhasish Mukherjee as Khanra Babu
- Partha Sarathi Chakraborty as Peto
- Aritra Dutta Banik as Circuit
- Arindam Dutta as Raja
- Raju Majumdar as Khoka's friend

== Production ==
=== Development ===
The film marked the Tollywood debut of dance choreographer Caeser Gonslaves of the Bosco–Caesar duo. The "Khokababu Title Track" was made with a budget of ₹80 lakhs. It was the most expensive Bengali film song at that time. Three other songs choreographed by D. Sankaraiyya, have been shot with a collective cost of ₹60−70 lakhs. Cumulatively, ₹1.75 crore was spent to shoot for all the songs in the film. The song "Pyar Ka Jhatka" was choreographed by Chinni Prakash. In an interview, Subhasree informed that she signed the film after a two hiatus since her last film Paran Jai Jaliya Re.

=== Filming ===
It also marked the film debut of music composer Savvy. Three songs barring "Pyar Ka Jhatka" and the "Khokababu Title Track", which have been choreographed by D. Sankaraiyya, has been filmed across Switzerland, Paris, France, Germany and Greece. In an interview, the producer Ashok Dhanuka mentioned that those spots were chosen by the choreographer himself.

=== Marketing ===
The Kolkata Police used the slogan "Khokababu" as a slogan in its signboards to rein in errant bikers in the city and to spread awareness about the need to wear helmets by kids riding pillion. Dev also had a special screening for underprivileged children, where he danced with them in the title track of the film and shared anecdotes with them.

West Bengal Chief Minister Mamata Banerjee attended a special screening of the film at the Satyajit Ray Film and Television Institute at 6 pm. Dev informed in an interview that the event was planned when he met Banerjee at her residence. When he asked her if she has watched any of his films including the then running Khokababu, she agreed to watch it. Although initially planned at the Nandan, the venue was later shifted to Satyajit Ray Film and Television Institute as Nandan was booked. She praised Dev's physique and dancing after the screening.

== Soundtrack ==
Khokababu

Soundtrack album by Rishi Chanda, Priyo Chatterjee and Savvy
- Released: November 2011
- Genre: Soundtrack
- Language: Bengali
- Label: Eskay Movies
- Producer: Rishi Chanda; Priyo Chatterjee; Savvy

Rishi Chanda chronology
Shedin Dekha Hoechilo	Khokababu (2012)	Megh Roddur (2013)

Savvy chronology
Khokababu (2012)	Goray Gondogol (2012)

The music of the film has been composed by Rishi Chanda, Priyo Chatterjee and Savvy. The lyrics have been penned by Gautam Sushmit, Prasen, Savvy and Riddhi.

No.	Title	Lyrics	Music	Singer(s)	Length
1.	"Khokababu Title Track"	Gautam Sushmit	Rishi Chanda	Rishi Chanda	3:21
2.	"Soniye Tu Janiye Tu"	Gautam Sushmit	Priyo Chatterjee	Zubeen Garg and June Banerjee	4:15
3.	"Elo Melo"	Prasen	Rishi Chanda	Kunal Ganjawala	4:13
4.	"Pyar Ka Jhatka"	Gautam Sushmit	Rishi Chanda	Mika Singh and Mamta Sharma	3:39
5.	"Je Dese"	Gautam Sushmit	Rishi Chanda	Zubeen Garg and Mahalakshmi Iyer	3:54
6.	"Mon Kande Pran Kande"	Gautam Sushmit	Rishi Chanda	Rishi Chanda and Roop Kumar Rathod	1:49
7.	"Khoka Chalu Cheez"	Savvy and Riddhi	Savvy	Dev	3:55

== Reception ==
=== Box office ===
Khokababu collected Rs ₹1.5 crore from its music release and ₹2 crore from the satellite rights before its release. After that it opened in the Bengal theatres and collected ₹30 lakhs on the first day. It collected est. ₹4 crore in 100 days.

=== Critical reception ===
Khokababu opened with positive reviews from the critics. Roshini Mukherjee of The Times of India gave the film 3.5 stars out of 5 saying "Our advise, keep that logic behind, dig into a tub of corn and let Khokababu do the rest". Gomolo.com gave it 3/5 saying "Viewers will not be disappointed at all with Khokababu which is a complete masala film with all the necessary ingredients in it." Burrp gave it 4/5 stars saying "It is a very good movie to watch, it is complete paisa wasool, with solid comedy, stylish action sequences, good music, and great location."

== Release ==
The film was released in the theatres on 13 January 2012. It was premiered on television on 15 August 2018.

== Accolades ==
Year	Award	Category	Result	Ref.
2013	75th Bengal Film Journalists' Association Awards	Bengal Film Journalists' Association – Best Actor Award	Won	

== Sequel ==
A spiritual sequel to the film, titled Khoka 420 was released in 2013. It became a box office success, earning ₹8 crore at the end of its theatrical run.
