= Anandalok Best Actress Award =

The Anandalok Puraskar or Anandalok Awards (Bengali: আনন্দলোক পুরস্কার) ceremony is one of the most prominent film events for Bengali Cinema in India. The Anandalok, only film magazine in Bengali language, published from Ananda Publishers and Ananda Bazar Patrika presents this Award (Puraskar). The magazine was started on 25 January 1975 and the awards (Puraskar) ceremony was started in 1998.

Following is a list of Best Actress honorees from the ceremony.

== Winners ==
Year	Winner	Film
1998	Mamta Shankar	Nayantara
1999	Indrani Haldar; Rituparna Sengupta	Dahan
2000	Indrani Haldar	Anu
2001	Aparna Sen	Paromitar Ek Din
2002	Aparna Sen	Titli
2003	Aishwarya Rai	Chokher Bali
2004	Vidya Balan	Bhalo Theko
2005	Debashree Roy	Tista
2006	Sreelekha Mitra	Kantatar
2007	Rituparna Sengupta	Anuranan
2008	Priyanka Sarkar	Chirodini Tumi Je Amar
2009	Koel Mallick	Saat Paake Bandha
2010	Payel Sarkar	Le Chakka
2011	Sohini Sengupta	Icche
2012	Swastika Mukherjee	Bhooter Bhabishyat
2022	Jaya Ahsan	Binisutoy
2025	Subhashree Ganguly; Koushani Mukherjee	Babli; Bohurupi
2026	Koel Mallick	Sharthopor

== See also ==
- List of Asian television awards
