= Biswajit Chakraborty =

Indian actor

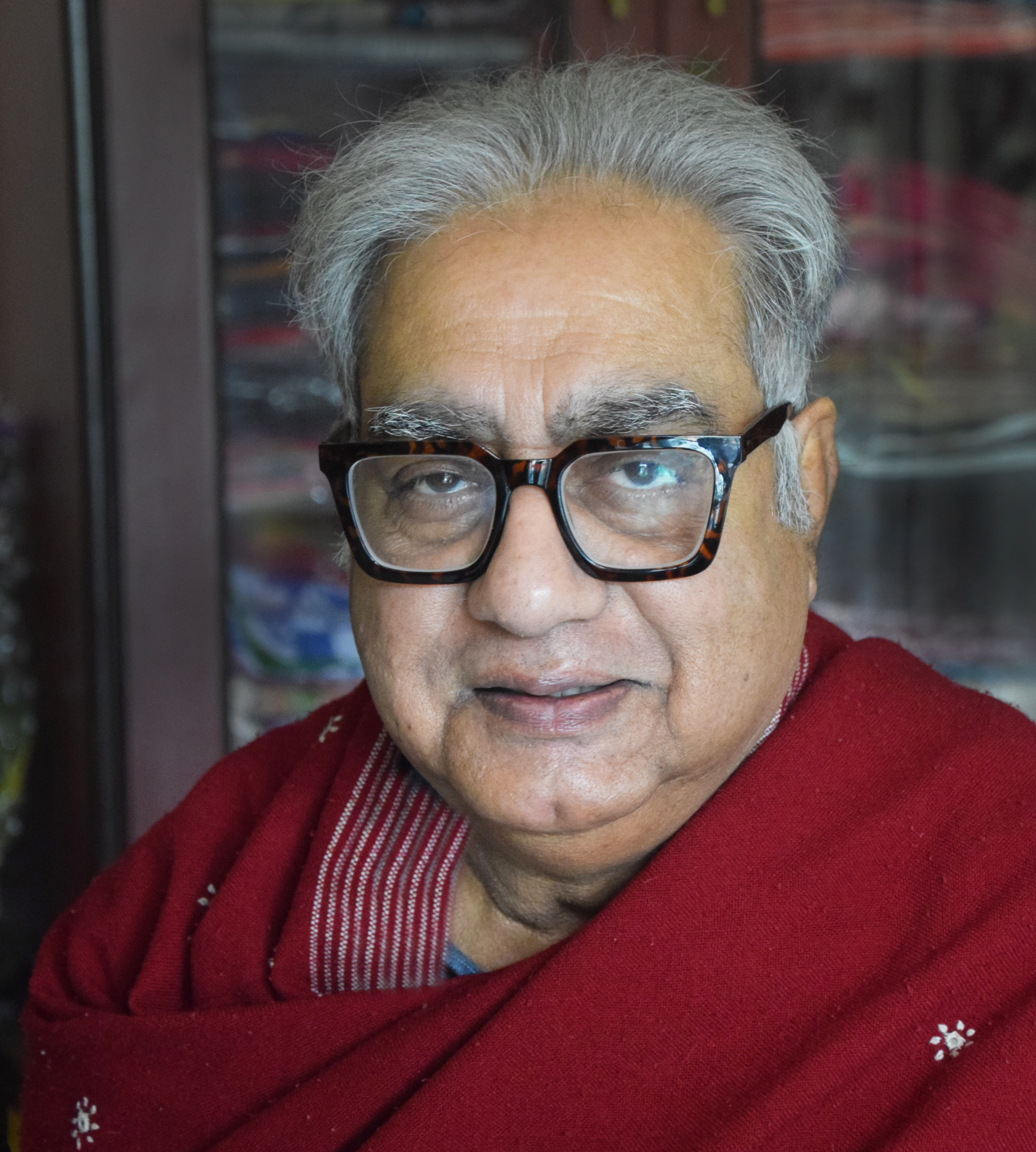
- Biswajit Chakraborty in 2024
- Born: 29 October 1948 (age 77)
- Education: Education in Civil engineering
- Occupation: Actor
- Years active: 1987 till now

Biswajit Chakraborty (born 29 October 1948) is an Indian film actor who appears predominantly in Bengali movies. He was born in Kolkata, West Bengal. His debut movie was Sunya Theke Suru directed by Ashoke Viswanathan. He has acted in more than a 100 movies including Autograph, Bye Bye Bangkok, Bhooter Bhabishyat and Bollywood movie Kahaani 2 and Meri Pyaari Bindu.

== Filmography ==
Year	Title	Role	Language	Notes
2026	Katukutu Buro		Bengali	
2025	Dear Maa	Abhinash Dutta	Bengali	
2025	Bhuto Purbo		Bengali	
2025	Sharthopor		Bengali	
2025	Bela	Bela's father	Bengali	
2025	College Campus		Bengali	
2024	Dard		Bengali	
2024	Shontaan	Amitava	Bengali	
2024	Nayan Rahasya	Nandalal Basak	Bengali	
2023	Pradhan	Deepak's father	Bengali	
2023	Datta	Rashbehari	Bengali	
2023	Nonte Fonte	C. C. Dhenku	Bengali	
2021	Tonic	Jaladhar's close friend	Bengali	
2021	Lover		Bengali	
2021	Abalamban		Bengali	
2021	Tui Aamar		Bengali	
2021	Beg For Life		Bengali	
2020	Hullor		Bengali	
2020	Asur	Governor	Bengali	
2019	Drishti		Bengali	
2019	Prem Amar 2	Joy's father	Bengali	
2019	Jaanbaaz		Bengali	
2019	Parineeta	Mehul's dad	Bengali	
2019	Sotoroi September		Bengali	
2018	Bagh Bondi Khela	The owner of Baagh's house	Bengali	
2018	Biday Byomkesh	Maheedar Chowdhury	Bengali	
2018	Dotara		Bengali	
2018	Raja Rani Raji	Isha's Father	Bengali	
2018	Dharasnan	Hara Babu	Bengali	
2018	Byomkesh Gotro	Maheedar Chowdhury	Bengali	
2018	Valentines Day	Aniket	Bengali	
2018	Jio Pagla	Landlord	Bengali	
2017	Soi Gaaor Chompa		Assamese-language	
2017	Yeti Obhijaan	Santu's Dad	Bengali	Archive footage
2017	Chardiker Golpo	Thakur Moshai (Priest)		
2017	Shob Bhooturey	Poritosh Mukherjee	Bengali	
2017	Meri Pyaari Bindu	Dr. Chowdhury	Hindi	
2017	The Hungry Stones	Wazir Khan	Bengali	Short film
2017	Mandobasar Gappo	Sreeporna's Father	Bengali	
2017	Ei To Jeebon	Pooja's Father	Bengali	
2016	Double Feluda	Suprakash Chowdhury a.k.a. Mr. Dastur	Bengali	
2016	Kahaani 2 : Durga Rani Singh	Lalbazar Police Inspector	Hindi	Bollywood debut
2016	Zulfiqar	Police Inspector	Bengali	Special Appearance
2016	Kelor Kirti	Haranath Mittir	Bengali	
2016	Power	Rajat Pratap Chowdhury	Bengali	
2016	Ki Kore Toke Bolbo	Barrister	Bengali	Special Appearance
2015	Besh Korechi Prem Korechi	Aditya's Father	Bengali	
2015	Shajarur Kanta	Nripati Laha	Bengali	
2015	Jamai 420	Father	Bengali	
2014	Badshahi Angti	Dhirendra Chowdhury	Bengali	
2014	Jaatishwar	Thakur Singha	Bengali	
2014	Byomkesh Phire Elo	Benimadhav	Bengali	
2014	Game	Abhimanyu's Dad	Bengali	
2014	Obhishopto Nighty	Police Officer	Bengali	
2013	Mishawr Rawhoshyo	Santu's Dad	Bengali	
2013	Half Serious		Bengali	
2013	Deewana	Abhi's Father	Bengali	
2012	Jekhane Bhooter Bhoy	Hrishikesh Banerjee	Bengali	
2012	Paglu 2	Dev's Dad	Bengali	
2012	Awara	Upendra Narayan / Surya's Elder Brother	Bengali	
2012	Hemlock Society	Police Inspector	Bengali	
2012	Goray Gandogol		Bengali	
2012	Abar Byomkesh	Maheedar Chowdhury	Bengali	
2012	Bhooter Bhabishyat	Brigaider Yudhajit Sarkar	Bengali	
2012	100% Love	Abhi's Grandfather	Bengali	
2012	Khokababu	Khoka's Dad	Bengali	
2011	Gosain Baganer Bhoot	Headmaster	Bengali	
2011	Romeo	Dibakar	Bengali	
2011	Jai Baba Bholenath		Bengali	
2011	Mone Pore Ajo Sei Din		Bengali	
2011	Someday Somewhere	Mridul Roy	Bengali	
2011	Teen Tanaya		Bengali	
2011	Jaani Dekha Hawbe		Bengali	
2011	Hello Memsaheb	Principal	Bengali	
2011	Urochithi	Mohit Dasgupta	Bengali	
2011	Ajob Prem Ebong...		Bengali	
2011	Icche	Jayanti's Father	Bengali	
2011	Shotru		Bengali	
2011	Necklace	Col. Bose	Bengali	
2011	Bye Bye Bangkok		Bengali	
2011	Egaro	Club Chairman	Bengali	
2011	Takhon 23		Bengali	
2011	Fighter	Suriya's Father	Bengali	
2011	Baishe Srabon	Public Prosecutor	Bengali	
2011	Katakuti	Medical Super at Asylum	Bengali	
2010	Bandhu Tomar		Bengali	
2010	Notobor Notout	Corbett	Bengali	
2010	Rose Crazy Rose	Mashai	Bengali	
2010	Kellafate		Bengali	
2010	Autograph	Manoj Sarkar	Bengali	
2010	Prem By Chance		Bengali	
2010	Pratidwandi		Bengali	
2010	Byomkesh Bakshi	Anadi Babu	Bengali	
2010	Target		Bengali	
2010	Le Chakka	Abir's Father	Bengali	
2010	Ganer Opare	Pradyumna Lahiri	Bengali	
2010	Wanted		Bengali	
2010	Bodhoshattva	Producer Roy	Bengali	
2010	Handa and Bhonda		Bengali	
2010	Mon Je Kore Uru Uru		Bengali	
2009	Prem Amar		Bengali	
2009	Cross Connection	Emon's Father	Bengali	
2009	Paran Jai Jaliya Re	Anna's Father	Bengali	
2009	Living Beyond The Line		Bengali / English	
2009	Madly Bengali		Bengali	
2009	Smritimedur	Abani Babu	Bengali	
2009	Challenge	Abir's Father	Bengali	
2009	Antaheen	Mr. Saha	Bengali	
2009	Hashi Kushi Club		Bengali	
2009	Jackpot	Inspector	Bengali	
2008	Pakhi		Bengali	
2008	Tintorettor Jishu	Hiralal Somani	Bengali	
2008	Mon Mane Na	Ria's Father	Bengali	
2008	Chaturanga	Man	Bengali	
2008	Bandhan	Actor	Bengali	TV series
2008	Bor Asbe Ekhuni	Mithli's Father	Bengali	
2008	Tolly Lights		Bengali	
2007	Dus Din Pore	Man	Bengali	
2007	Chander Bari	Man	Bengali	
2007	Mahaguru	Abhimanyu's Relative	Bengali	
2006	Abhimanyu	Actor	Bengali	
2006	The Bong Connection	Andy's Relative	Bengali	
2006	Bibar	Principal	Bengali	
2006	Priyotoma	Jeet's Realetive	Bengali	
2005	Shubhodristi		Bengali	
2005	Antarmahal	Priest	Bengali	
2004	Abar Asbo Phire	Actor	Bengali	
2004	Bandhan	Jeet's Realetive	Bengali	
2004	Kalo Chita	Man	Bengali	
2001	Hemanter Pakhi	The Actor	Bengali	
1993	Sunya Theke Shuru	Actor Babu	Bengali	
1990	Papi	The Man	Bengali	Tollywood debut

== Television series ==
- Maa....Tomay Chara Ghum Asena (19 September 2009 to 3 August 2014)
- Soudaminir Sansar (17 June 2019 to 2021)
- Mithai (4 January 2021 to 9 June 2023)
- Didi No.1
- Ranga Bou (12 December 2022 to 16 December 2023)
- Sandhya Tara (11 June 2023 to present)
- Shyama (11 September 2023 to 3 December 2023)
- Anurager Chhowa (2023)
- Ke Prothom Kache Eshechi (2024)
- Abar Proloy (2023)
- Mittir Bari (2025) as Shyam Sundar Sen aka Triple S
- Jowar Bhanta (2025–present)
- O Mor Dorodiya (2025–present) as Shibnath Ray
- Ghurni (2026–present) as Dipendra Narayan Dutta

== Awards ==
Year	Award	Category	Name	Result
2022	West Bengal Tele Academy Awards	Best Actor (Supporting role)	Mithai	Won
