= Bela (film) =

Indian Bengali-language biographical film

- Directed by: Anilava Chatterjee
- Produced by: Greymind Communications Private Limited
- Starring: Rituparna Sengupta; Biswajit Chakraborty; Manasi Sinha; Bhaswar Chatterjee; Sourav Chakraborty; Bhadra Basu; Debdut Ghosh; Debapratim Dasgupta; Padmanabha Dasgupta; Bulbuli Panja; Rajannya Mitra; Srija Bhattacharyya; Aryuun Ghosh; Basabdatta Chattopadhyay
- Cinematography: Saurav Banerjee
- Edited by: Sujay Datta Ray
- Music by: Ranajoy Bhattacharjee,
- Distributed by: PVR Inox Pictures
- Release date: 29 August 2025
- Running time: 114 Minutes
- Country: India
- Language: Bengali

Bela is an Indian Bengali-language biographical film based on the life of Bela Dey, a pioneering radio personality associated with Akashvani Kolkata. The film traces her journey following the abandonment by her husband, her subsequent reinvention while living in England, and her return to India, where she created the influential radio programme Mohila Mahal, which addressed social issues and reached millions of women listeners. The film highlights her resilience and role in challenging societal norms and promoting women's empowerment. Directed by Anilava Chatterjee, the film stars Rituparna Sengupta in the titular role and pays tribute to Bela Dey's legacy in Bengali media.

Bela was released on 29 August 2025. It was produced under the banner of Greymind Communications Private Limited. Rituparna Sengupta plays the lead role of Bela Dey. Padmanabh Dasgupta, Biswajit Chakraborty, Devdoot Ghosh, Devpratim Dasgupta, Bhaswar Chatterjee and Manasi Sinha play supporting roles.

This film is Anilava Chatterjee' first film as a director. The film was shot over a period of about a month and a half in various locations in Kolkata.

== Plot ==
In Bela, director Anilavaa Chatterjee depicts 1960s Calcutta while chronicling the life and career of radio personality Bela Dey. The film portrays her journey from personal adversity to professional recognition, highlighting her determination and resilience. It focuses on her role as the creator and host of the radio programme Mohila Mahal on All India Radio, through which she became an influential voice on women's issues and inspired a wide audience.

== Releases ==
Bela Film Trailer was released on 29 August 2025.

== Cast ==
- Rituparna Sengupta as Bela Dey.
- Biswajit Chakraborty as Bela's father.
- Bhadra Basu as Bela's mother.
- Debdut Ghosh as Bela's brother.
- Debapratim Dasgupta as Birendra Krishna Bhadra.
- Padmanabha Dasgupta as Bela's brother.
- Bulbuli Panja
- Rajannya Mitra
- Manasi Sinha
- Srija Bhattacharyya
- Aryuun Ghosh
- Basabdatta Chattopadhyay
- Bhaswar Chatterjee
- Sourav Chakraborty

== Reception ==
Poorna Banerjee of Times of India gave it a rating of 3.5 out of 5 saying that, Rituparna Sengupta's performance alone makes it worth watching, but coupled with an inspiring story, strong music, and heartfelt direction, it becomes a moving reminder of how one voice can echo across generations and influence thoughts that bring progress. Ranjan Bandyapadhya of Sangbad Pratidin said that, The film's greatest strength is Rituparna's portrayal of Bela, where her restrained yet fire-within performance brings the once-forgotten, luminous Bela Dey vividly back to life.
