= Subhashree Ganguly =

Indian actress in Bengali films (born 1990)

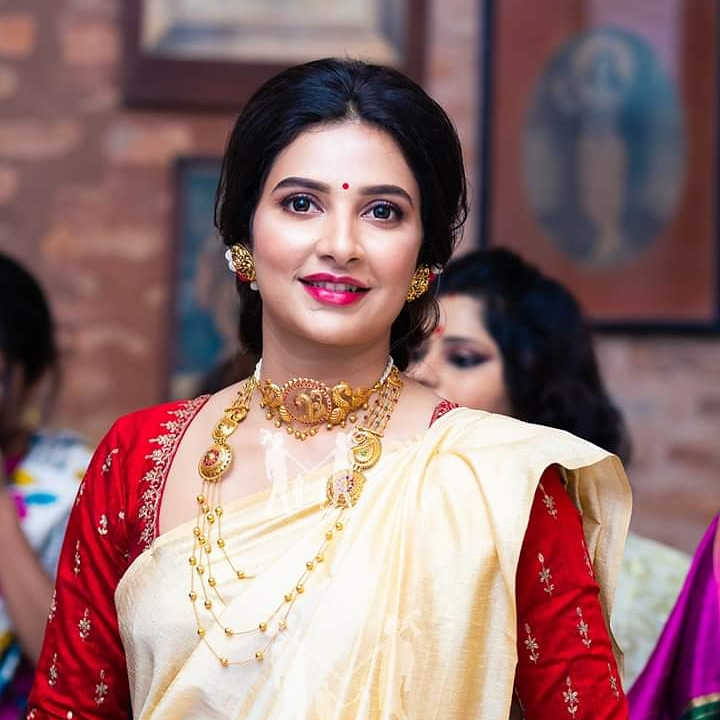
- Subhashree in 2018
- Born: 3 November 1990 (age 36); Bardhaman, West Bengal, India
- Other name: Subhashree
- Occupation: Actress
- Years active: 2007–present
- Spouse: Raj Chakraborty (m. 2018)
- Children: 2
- Awards: Filmfare Awards (2021, 2022, 2025); Anandalok Awards (2008, 2025); West Bengal Film Journalists' Association Awards (2020)

Subhashree Ganguly (born 3 November 1990), also credited mononymously as Subhashree, is an Indian actress who primarily works in Bengali movies. One of the highest paid and leading actresses of Bengali cinema, Ganguly made her acting debut in Prabhat Roy's Pitribhumi (2007).

She has worked in numerous commercially successful Bengali films like Challenge, Paran Jai Jaliya Re (2009), Romeo, Khokababu (2012), Khoka 420 (2013), Boss, Game, Ami Shudhu Cheyechi Tomay (2014), Abhimaan (2016), Boss 2: Back to Rule (2017), Nabab (2017), Chalbaaz (2018) as well as Parineeta (2019), Dharmajuddha, Boudi Canteen (2022), Babli, Shontaan (2024), Grihapravesh and Dhumketu (2025) and Lawho Gouranger Naam Rey (2025).

== Early life and background ==
Subhashree Ganguly was born on 3 November 1990 in Bardhaman, West Bengal to Bina and Debaprasad Ganguly into a Bengali Brahmin family. She studied at Burdwan Municipal Girls' High School.

In 2006 after completing her 10th class, she joined the television reality show Anandalok Nayikar Khonje and became the winner. After that, she started her career as a model, and then she made her debut in the film industry with the Oriya-film Mate Ta Love Helare in 2008, which was directed by Ashok Pati. Subsequently, she made her debut in Bengali films with Pitribhumi, in which she played a supporting role.

== Personal life ==
In the year 2016, when Ganguly was filming Abhimaan, she had a relationship with the director of the film, Raj Chakraborty. On 6 March 2018, they got engaged in Kolkata and were married on 11 May at Bawali Rajbari. On 12 September 2020, she gave birth to a baby boy. On 30 November 2023, they had a baby girl.

== Career ==
After winning Anandalok Nayikar Khonje in 2006, Subhashree made her debut in Oriya films with Mate Ta Love Helare. Subsequently, she made her debut in Bengali films with Pitribhumi, in which she played a supporting role.

She rose to prominence after working with Bengali film actor Dev in films such as Challenge, Khokababu, Khoka 420, Romeo, Paran Jai Jaliya Re and Dhumketu. Khoka 420, Paran Jai Jaliya Re and Dhumketu are ranked among the highest grossing Bengali movies of all time.

Her pairing with another Bengali actor Jeet has been equally successful with films like Boss, Game, Abhimaan and Boss 2: Back to Rule. Boss 2: Back to Rule has been ranked among the biggest hits in the history of Bengali cinema and one of the highest grossing Bengali movies of all time.

She paired up with Shakib Khan in the films Nabab and Chalbaaz.

In 2019, film Parineeta marked a significant change in her career. Her portrayal of mehul brought her appreciation from critics and she won multiple awards for best actress, including Best Actor In A Leading Role (Female) in Filmfare Awards Bangla.

In 2022, her performance in Boudi Canteen earned her the Filmfare award for Best Actor (Female) Critics.

In 2024, Babli brought her third Filmfare Award Bangla for Best Actress award. Her second release of the year, Shontaan, brought her another nomination in Filmfare Award Bangla for Best Supporting Actress category.

== Filmography ==
Key
| † | Denotes films that have not yet been released |

=== Films ===
- All films are in Bengali, unless mentioned otherwise.

List of Subhashree Ganguly film credits
| Year | Title | Role(s) | Notes | Ref. |
|---|---|---|---|---|
| 2007 | Pitribhumi | Jhuma | Debut in Bengali film | |
| 2008 | Mate Ta Love Helare | Megha | Debut in Odia film | |
| 2008 | Bajimaat | Jhilik | | |
| 2009 | Challenge | Pooja Sen | | |
| 2009 | Paran Jai Jaliya Re | Anamika "Anna" Banerjee | | |
| 2011 | Romeo | Pooja Chatterjee | | |
| 2012 | Khokababu | Pooja | | |
| 2013 | Megh Roddur | Madhuja Sen | | |
| 2013 | Khoka 420 | Bhoomi | | |
| 2013 | Boss: Born to Rule | Rusha Roy | | |
| 2014 | Ami Shudhu Cheyechi Tomay | Bhoomi | Indo-Bangladesh joint production | |
| 2014 | Game: He Plays to Win | Trisha | | |
| 2014 | Shesh Boley Kichu Nei | Kakoli / Koko | | |
| 2014 | Bachchan | Dancer | Special appearance in a song | |
| 2014 | Spark | Anupama | Debut in Hindi film | |
| 2016 | Prem Ki Bujhini | Paromita / Paro | Indo-Bangladesh joint production | |
| 2016 | Abhimaan | Dishani | | |
| 2017 | Amar Aponjon | Shree | | |
| 2017 | Boss 2: Back to Rule | Rusha Roy | Indo-Bangladesh joint production | |
| 2017 | Nabab | Diya / Salma | Indo-Bangladesh joint production | |
| 2017 | Dekh Kemon Lage | Gunja | | |
| 2018 | Honeymoon | Jayati | | |
| 2018 | Chalbaaz | Srijeeta | | |
| 2018 | Rosogolla | Malkanjaan | Special appearance | |
| 2019 | Parineeta | Mehul Bose | | |
| 2022 | Habji Gabji | Ahana Basu | | |
| 2022 | Dharmajuddha | Munni | | |
| 2022 | Bismillah | Fatima | | |
| 2022 | Boudi Canteen | Poulami | | |
| 2023 | Doctor Bakshi | Mrinalini | | |
| 2024 | Babli | Damayanti "Babli" | | |
| 2024 | Shontaan | Adv. Indrani Sen | | |
| 2025 | Grihapravesh | Titli Ray | | |
| 2025 | Dhumketu | Rupa | | |
| 2025 | Lawho Gouranger Naam Rey | Binodini Dasi | | |
| 2026 | Abhhiman | Shree | | |
| 2026 | DeSu7 | Dr. Subhasmita Chowdhury | | |
| 2026 | Waiting Room † | TBA | Completed | |

=== Web series ===
List of Subhashree Ganguly web series credits
| Year | Web Series | Role(s) | Language | Platform | Notes | Ref. |
|---|---|---|---|---|---|---|
| 2023 | Indubala Bhaater Hotel | Indubala Mallick | Bengali | Hoichoi | Web series debut | |
| 2025 | Anusandhan | Journalist Anumita Sen | Bengali | Hoichoi | | |

=== Television ===
| Year | Serial | Character | Channel |
|---|---|---|---|
| 2 October 2016 | Didi No. 1 | (season 7) Contestant, promotion of film Abhimaan | Zee Bangla |
| 21 July 2017 | Didi No. 1 | (season 7) Contestant, promotion of film Dekh Kemon Lage | Zee Bangla |
| 16 September 2018 | Didi No. 1 | (season 8) Grand Opening, Winner | Zee Bangla |
| 24 February 2019 – 26 May 2019 | Ebar Jombe Moja | (season 1) Judge | Star Jalsha |
| 2 September 2019 | Didi No. 1 | (season 8) Contestant, promotion of film Parineeta | Zee Bangla |
| 6 September 2019 | Dadagiri Unlimited | (season 8) Contestant, promotion of film Dharmajuddha | Zee Bangla |
| 25 April 2021 | Didi No. 1 | (season 8) Contestant, Baisakhi Bumper | Zee Bangla |
| May–December 2021 | Dance Bangla Dance | (season 11) Judge | Zee Bangla |
| 2023 | Dance Bangla Dance | (season 12) Judge | Zee Bangla |
| 2024 | Grihoprobesh | Producer | Star Jalsha |
| 2025 | Dance Bangla Dance | (season 13) Judge | Zee Bangla |

=== Mahalaya ===
| Year | Serial | Character | Channel |
|---|---|---|---|
| 7 October 2010 | Mahishasurmardini Ayi Bhubonomonomohini | Devi Yogmaya, Devi Mahamaya, Devi Mangalchandi, Devi Kattayani and Devi Mahishasurmardini | Zee Bangla |
| 15 October 2012 | 51 Sotipith | Devi Parvati, Devi Mahamaya, Devi Ugrakali, Devi Lalita Tripura Sundari and Devi Mahishasurmardini | Zee Bangla |
| 23 September 2014 | Noborupe Adrija | Devi Mahishasuramardini and her Nabadurga avatars | Ruposhi Bangla |
| 28 September 2019 | 12 Mashe 12 Rupe Debibaran | Devi Uma & Devi Mahishasurmardini | Zee Bangla |
| 6 October 2021 | Nanarupe Mahamaya Shaktirupeno Shansthita | Devi Adyashakti and Devi Mahishasurmardini | Zee Bangla |
| 25 September 2022 | Singhabahini Trinayani | Devi Mahishasurmardini | Zee Bangla |
| 2 October 2024 | Noborupe Debi Durga | Devi Mahamaya and Devi Mahishasurmardini | Zee Bangla |
| 10 October 2026 | Rupe Rupantare Mahisasurmardini | Devi Mahamaya, Devi Mahalakshmi, Devi Parbati and Devi Mahishasurmardini | Star Jalsha |

== Awards ==
| Year | Award | Category | Film |
|---|---|---|---|
| 2006 | Anandalok Awards | Fairever Anandalok Nayikar Khonje | |
| 2008 | Anandalok Awards | Best Debut in Bengali cinema | Bajimaat |
| 2013 | Bengali Youth & Cultural Awards | Best Actress | |
| 2013 | Tele Cine Awards | Best Actress | Khokababu |
| 2014 | Kalakar Awards | Best Actress | Khoka 420 |
| 2015 | Kalakar Awards | Best Actress | Ami Shudhu Cheyechi Tomay |
| 2015 | Tele Cine Awards | Best Actress | Ami Shudhu Cheyechi Tomay |
| 2018 | Tele Cine Awards | Best Actress | Honeymoon |
| 2018 | International Bengali Film Awards | Best Actress | Honeymoon |
| 2018 | Kalakar Awards | Tolly Queen of the year | Boss 2, Nabab |
| 2020 | WBFJA Award | Best Actress in a Leading Role | Parineeta |
| 2020 | Films & Frames Digital Film Awards | Best Actress | Parineeta |
| 2021 | Filmfare Awards Bangla | Best Actor - Leading Role (Female) | Parineeta |
| 2023 | Filmfare Awards Bangla | Best Actor - Leading Role (Female) - critics award | Boudi Canteen |
| 2023 | Mahanayak Samman | | |
| 2023 | Zee Bangla Sonar Sansar 2023 | Priyo Sodosyo | Dance Bangla Dance |
| 2023 | TV 9 Bangla Ghorer Bioscope | Best Actress | Indubala Bhaater Hotel |
| 2024 | Siima Awards | Best Regional Actress Critics | Indubala Bhaater Hotel |
| 2024 | OTT Samman | Best Actress in a Leading Role | Indubala Bhaater Hotel |
| 2024 | Zee Bangla Sonar Sansar 2024 | Priyo Sodosyo | Dance Bangla Dance |
| 2025 | Joy Filmfare Glamour and Style Awards Bengal | Most Stylish Star (Female) | |
| 2025 | Filmfare Awards Bangla | Best Actor - Leading Role (Female) | Babli |
| 2025 | Anadalok Awards | Best Actress | Babli |
| 2025 | Anadalok Awards | Best Supporting Actress | Shontaan |
| 2026 | WBFJA Award | Best Actress in a Leading Role | Grihapravesh |
| 2026 | Zee 24 Ghanta Binodoner Sera 24 | Best Actor-Female | Grihapravesh |
| 2026 | Tele Cine Awards 2026 | Best Actor-Female | Grihapravesh |
