= Savvy Gupta =

Savvy Gupta স্যাভি
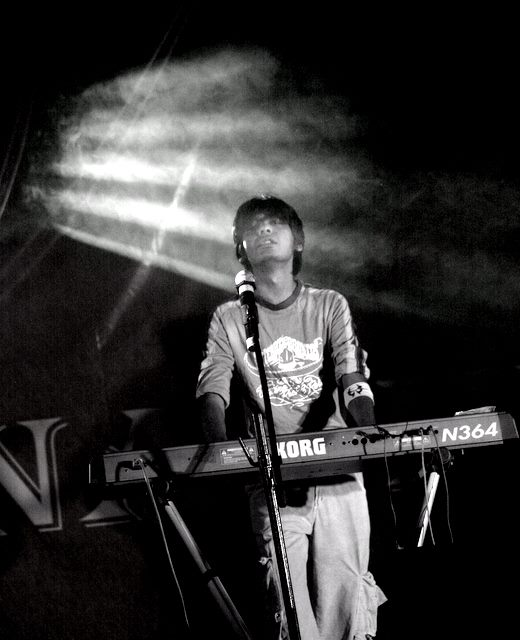

Background information
- Also known as: Savvy
- Born: Souvik Gupta; 4 May 1983 (age 42); Kolkata, West Bengal, India
- Occupations: Composer; Lyricist; Singer; Programmer
- Years active: 2012–present

Souvik Gupta, known as "Savvy" (Bengali: স্যাভি), is an Indian music director who has composed and sung songs for Bengali movies from both West Bengal and Bangladesh.

== Career ==
Gupta formerly played keyboard and sung for Kolkata-based rock bands Insomnia and Crystal Grass. He started his journey as a film composer in the year 2012 with the film Khokababu, composing the song "Khoka Chalu Cheez" sung by actor Dev. He was the composer for the theme song of the first ever Kolkata fashion week. In addition to composing for Indian film soundtracks, Gupta also composes music for Bangladeshi film soundtracks.

He is an electronics engineer and completed his bachelor's degree from NITMUS in 2006. He passed out higher secondary from Nava Nalanda High School, South Kolkata.

== Discography ==
=== Film Soundtracks ===
==== As Composer ====
Denotes films that have not yet been released

Year	Film	Song	Singer(s)	Label	Notes	Reference(s)
2012	Khokababu	"Khoka Chalu Cheez"	Dev	Eskay Movies	Along with Rishi Chanda, Priyo Chatterjee	
2012	Goray Gondogol	All Songs	Various Artists			
2012	Challenge 2	"Pyar Ka Bukhar"	Suraj Jagan	Shree Venkatesh Films	Along with Jeet Gannguli	
2012	Bawali Unlimited	All Songs except Bawali Unlimited, Mon Ure Chole	Rupankar, Raghab Chatterjee, Sudipto	Saitronics	Along with Dev Sen	
2013	Khoka 420	"Gobhir Joler Fish"	Abhijeet Bhattacharya, Akriti Kakkar	Eskay Movies	Along with Rishi Chanda, Shree Pritam, Shrijit	
2013	Khoka 420	"Mad I Am Mad"	Mika Singh, Saberi Bhattacharya	Eskay Movies	Along with Rishi Chanda, Shree Pritam, Shrijit	
2013	Majnu	O Piya Re Piya	Arijit Singh, June Banerjee	Shree Venkatesh Films	Along with Rishi Chanda	
2013	Majnu	"Lonely Very Lonely"	Zubeen Garg	Shree Venkatesh Films	Along with Rishi Chanda	
2014	Ami Shudhu Cheyechi Tomay	"Pakka Ghughu Maal"	Shadaab Hashmi	Eskay Movies	Along with Hridoy Khan, Akassh	
2014	Ami Shudhu Cheyechi Tomay	"Aami Shudhu Cheyechi Tomay"	Mohammad Irfan	Eskay Movies	Along with Hridoy Khan, Akassh	
2014	Ami Shudhu Cheyechi Tomay	"Calling Bell"	Nakash Aziz, Saberi Bhattacharya	Eskay Movies	Along with Hridoy Khan, Akassh	
2014	Bindaas	"Party Shoes"	Shadaab Hashmi, Neha Kakkar	Shree Venkatesh Films	Along with Arindom Chatterjee, Habib Wahid, Devi Sri Prasad, Dev	
2014	Bindaas	"Remix Qawwali"	Nakash Aziz, Neha Kakkar	Shree Venkatesh Films	Along with Arindom Chatterjee, Habib Wahid, Devi Sri Prasad, Dev	
2014	Janla Diye Bou Palalo	All Songs	Abhijit Barman, Anupam Roy, Akriti Kakar, Timir Biswas, Karthik Das Baul	Asha Audio		
2014	Yoddha: The Warrior	"Desi Chhori"	Satrujit Dasgupta, Neha Kakkar	Shree Venkatesh Films	Along with Indraadip Dasgupta	
2014	Yoddha: The Warrior	"Yoddhar Saathe Ebar Pujo Katan"	Nakash Aziz	Shree Venkatesh Films	Along with Indraadip Dasgupta	
2015	Romeo vs Juliet	"Bekheyali Mone"	Shadaab Hashmi	Eskay Movies, Jaaz Multimedia	Along with Akassh	
2015	Romeo vs Juliet	"Mahiya Mahiya"	Arindom Chatterjee	Eskay Movies, Jaaz Multimedia	Along with Akassh	
2015	Romeo vs Juliet	"Saiyaan"	Zubeen Garg, Akriti Kakkar	Eskay Movies, Jaaz Multimedia	Along with Akassh	
2015	Ekla Cholo					
2015	Sesh Anka					
2015	Agnee 2	"Magic Mamoni"	Neha Kakkar	Eskay Movies, Jaaz Multimedia	Along with Akassh	
2015	Aashiqui	All Songs	Savvy, Jubin Nautiyal, Kona, Nakash Aziz, Mohammed Irfan, Akriti Kakar, Shadaab Hashmi	Eskay Movies, Jaaz Multimedia	Along with Shadaab Hashmi	
2015	Mayer Biye					
2015	Bengal Celebrity League	Midnapore Mighties Anthem Song	Savvy	Dev Entertainment Ventures	Director Raja Chanda, Cast Dev, Sayantika Banerjee, Nusrat Jahan, Joy and More	
2016	Hero 420	All Songs	Nakash Aziz, Mohammed Irfan, Shadaab Hashmi, Ash King, Kalpana Patowary	Eskay Movies, Jaaz Multimedia		
2016	Niyoti	All Songs	Savvy, Lemis, Kona, Runa Laila, Mohammed Irfan, Shaan, Imran Mahmudul, Nancy	Eskay Movies, Jaaz Multimedia	"Onek Sadhonar Pore" is a remake of the song of the same name from the 1998 film Bhalobashi Tomake	
2016	Samraat: The King Is Here	"Dujone"	Shadaab Hashmi	Tiger Media Limited	Along with Dabbu, Imran Mahmudul, Arfin Rumey	
2016	Samraat: The King Is Here	"Dujone (Unplugged)"	Savvy	Tiger Media Limited	Along with Dabbu, Imran Mahmudul, Arfin Rumey	
2016	Samraat: The King Is Here	"Dujone (Instrumental)"		Tiger Media Limited	Along with Dabbu, Imran Mahmudul, Arfin Rumey	
2016	Rokto	"Dhim Tana"	Akriti Kakar	Eskay Movies, Jaaz Multimedia	Along with Akassh	
2016	Prem Ki Bujhini	All Songs	Savvy, Ash King, Madhubanti Bagchi, Jayeeta, Shadaab Hashmi, Palak Muchhal, Zubeen Garg	Eskay Movies, Jaaz Multimedia		
2017	Bibaho Diaries	All Songs	Savvy, Lagnajita Chakraborty, Anupam Roy, Somlata Acharyya Chowdhury	Eros International		
2017	Nabab	All Songs except O DJ O DJ	Shadaab Hashmi, Akriti Kakkar, Ankit Tiwari, Madhura Bhattacharya, Raza Ali Khan	Eskay Movies, Jaaz Multimedia	Along with Akassh	
2017	Rangbaz	"Ghum Amar"	Jubin Nautiyal, Prashmita Paul	Unlimited Audio Video	Along with Dabbu	
2017	Rangbaz	"Tui Chad Eider"	Savvy, Nandini Deb	Unlimited Audio Video	Along with Dabbu	
2018	Noor Jahaan	All Songs	Raj Barman, Prashmita Paul, Imran Mahmudul, Kona, Lagnajita Chakraborty	Shree Venkatesh Films, Jaaz Multimedia	Song "Shona Bondhu" is a cover of the song by Abdul Gafur Hali and was released as a single in 2017	
2018	Inspector Notty K	"Moner Kinare"	Raj Barman	Grassroot Entertainment, Jaaz Multimedia	Along with Suddho Roy	
2018	Bhalo Theko	"Biye"	Savvy, Prashmita Paul	Tiger Media Limited		
2018	Bhalo Theko	"Mon Deewana"	Imran Mahmudul, Gopika	Tiger Media Limited		
2018	Bhalo Theko	"Heel"	Savvy, Gopika	Tiger Media Limited		
2018	Bizli	Friend Beautiful	Shadaab Hashmi, Madhubanti Bagchi, Madhushree, Armaan Malik	Jaaz Multimedia, Bobstar Films	Along with Akassh, Ahmmed Humayun, Shafiq Tuhin	
2018	Chalbaaz	All Songs	Savvy, Shadaab Hashmi, Madhubanti Bagchi, Madhushree, Armaan Malik	Eskay Movies		
2018	Honeymoon	All Songs	Dev Negi, Akriti Kakkar	Surinder Films		
2018	Sultan: The Saviour	Masha Allah	Dev Negi, Akriti Kakkar	Jeetz Filmworks, Surinder Films	Along with Suddho Roy	
2018	Sultan: The Saviour	Aamar Mon	Mohammed Irfan	Jeetz Filmworks, Surinder Films	Along with Suddho Roy	
2018	Bhaijaan Elo Re	"Bhaijaan Eid E Elo Re" (Title Song)	Abhijeet Bhattacharya	Eskay Movies	Along with Dolaan Mainnakk	
2018	Hoichoi Unlimited	All Songs	Abhijeet Bhattacharya, Mika Singh, Madhubanti Bagchi, Armaan Malik, Nikhita Gandhi	Dev Entertainment Ventures		
2019	Shahenshah	Rashik Amar	Savvy, Kona	Unlimited Audio Video	Along with Dabbu	
2019	Password	Swag	Imran	SK Films	Along with Lincon, Akassh	
2019	Bhokatta	Honey Tor Tufani	Raj Barman	Eskay Movies	Along with Dolaan Mainnakk, Baidyanath Dash	
2019	Panther: Hindustan Meri Jaan	Udashi Shon	Ishan Mitra	Jeetz Filmworks	Along with Suddho Roy, Amit-Ishan	
2019	17th September	All Songs	Rupankar, Arnab Dutta, Ishan Mitra, Lagnajita	Zee Music Company		
2019	Love Story	"Chupi Chupi Mon"	Raj Barman, Prashmita	Surinder Films	Film released in 2020	
2019	Love Story	"Ay Na Aro Kache"	Raj Barman	Surinder Films	Film released in 2020	
2019	Love Story	"Tui Chara"	Shashwat Singh	Surinder Films	Film released in 2020	
2019	Love Story	"Danpitey"	Timir Biswas	Surinder Films	Film released in 2020	
2019	Password	"Trippy Lage"	Nikhita Gandhi, Shashwat Singh	Zee Music Company		
2019	Password	"Aye Khuda"	KK	Zee Music Company		
2020	SOS Kolkata	"Raagi Raja"	Oindrila Sanyal, Nikhita Gandhi, Dev Arijit			
2020	Switzerland	All Songs	Nakash Aziz, Nikhita Gandhi, Jeet, Dev Negi, Akriti Kakkar, Ishan Mitra	Jeetz Filmworks		
2021	Miss Call			Surinder Films		
2022	Raavan	"Keu Jaane Naa"	Arijit Singh	Grassroot Entertainment		
2022	Raavan	"Ami Tor"	Javed Ali, Antara Mitra	Grassroot Entertainment		
2022	Raavan	"Keu Jaane Naa (Reprised Version)"	Yasser Dedai	Grassroot Entertainment		
2023	Love Marriage	"Acho Kemon"	Iman Chakraborty	Surinder Films		
2023	Love Marriage	"Jodidong Hridoyong Tobo"	Somlata Acharyya Chowdhury, Rupak Tiary	Surinder Films		
2023	Manush: Child of Destiny	"Tumi Amari Hobe"	Shashwat Singh	Grassroot Entertainment	Along with Aneek Dhar and Ahmmed Humayun	
2023	Manush: Child of Destiny	"Aador Diye Chui"	Sonu Nigam	Grassroot Entertainment	Along with Aneek Dhar and Ahmmed Humayun	
2023	Manush: Child of Destiny	"Udd Jaun Tere Sang"	Shashwat Singh	Grassroot Entertainment	Along with Aneek Dhar and Ahmmed Humayun	
2023	Manush: Child of Destiny	"Din Ka Hai Tara Mera Tu"	Sonu Nigam	Grassroot Entertainment	Along with Aneek Dhar and Ahmmed Humayun	
2024	Khadaan	"Rajar Raja"	Dev Arijit	Surinder Films		

==== As singer ====
Year	Film	Song	Label	Reference(s)
2015	Aashiqui	"Meyeder Mon Bojha" (with Kona)	Eskay Music Jaaz Music	
2016	Niyoti	"Dhakai Sharee" (with Lemis)	Eskay Music Jaaz Music	
2016	Prem Ki Bujhini	"Bongo Lolona" (with Madhubanti Bagchi & Jayeeta)	Eskay Music Jaaz Music	
2016	Samraat: The King Is Here	"Dujone (Unplugged)"	Tiger Media Limited	
2017	Bibaho Diaries	"Tumi Nei"	Eros International	
2017	Rangbaz	"Tui Chad Eider" (with Nandini Deb)	Unlimited Audio Video	
2018	Bhalo Theko	"Biye" (with Prashmita)	Tiger Media Limited	
2018	Bhalo Theko	"Heel" (with Gopika)	Tiger Media Limited	

==== As lyricist ====
Year	Film	Song	Reference(s)
2013	Mahapurush O Kapurush	All Songs	
2017	Rangbaaz	"Tui Chad Eider"	

=== Singles ===
Year	Title	Label	Composer	Lyricist	Album	Notes	Reference(s)
2017	"My Fantasy... My Destiny" (performed by Somak Chatterjee)	Eskay Movies	Savvy	Suddhasil Bose		English version of "Tor Aashiqui" from Aashiqui soundtrack	
2017	"Shona Bondhu" (performed by Raj Burman & Prashmita)	SVF Music Jaaz Multimedia	Savvy	Abdul Gafur Hali	Noor Jahaan	Remake of "Shona Bondhu" by Abdul Gafur Hali	
2018	"Mon Boleche" (performed by Imran & Kona)	SVF Music Jaaz Multimedia	Savvy	Soumyadeb	Noor Jahaan		
2018	"Moner Kinare" (performed by Raj Burman)	Grassroot Entertainment Jaaz Multimedia	Savvy	Pranjol	Inspector Notty K		

== Accolades ==
Year	Nominated work	Category	Award	Result	Notes	Ref.
2018	Bibaho Diaries	Best Music Album	Filmfare Award	Pending	Filmfare Awards East	

Year	Nominated work	Category	Award	Result	Notes	Ref.
2019	Ghare and Baire	Best Music Album Popular Choice	Mirchi Award	Won		

Year	Nominated work	Category	Award	Result	Notes	Ref.
2019	Hoichoi Unlimited	Best Music Director	TeleCine Award	Won	TeleCine Awards	
