= Babli (film) =

2024 Indian Bengali-language film

- Theatrical release poster
- Directed by: Raj Chakraborty
- Written by: Souvik Bhattacharya (dialogues)
- Screenplay by: Raj Chakraborty
- Story by: Buddhadeb Guha
- Based on: Babli by Buddhadeb Guha
- Produced by: Raj Chakraborty; Subhashree Ganguly
- Starring: See below
- Cinematography: Manas Ganguly
- Edited by: Sanglap Bhowmik
- Music by: Indradeep Dasgupta
- Production company: Raj Chakraborty Entertainment Productions
- Distributed by: PVR Inox Pictures
- Release date: 15 August 2024 (India)
- Country: India
- Language: Bengali

Babli is a 2024 Bengali period romantic drama film co-written and directed by Raj Chakraborty, based on Buddhadeb Guha's novel of the same name. This film was released on 15 August 2024 under the banner of Raj Chakraborty Entertainment Productions.

== Premise ==
Set in 1995, Abhiroop is a graduate from the London School of Economics. On the way to Dimapur from Imphal by car he befriended Damayanti aka Babli, his boss's relative. Babli, a chubby girl, thinks that writers don't create stories about people like her. She has a little complex about being overweight. Still their friendship takes a new colour during the journey. When their car broke down midway they had to stay in a wooden house inside the jungle. Babli started to feel vulnerable after knowing that her air hostess friend Jhuma is also attracted to Abhiroop.

== Cast ==
- Abir Chatterjee as Abhiroop sen
- Subhashree Ganguly as Damayanti alias Babli
- Sauraseni Maitra as Jhuma Bose, an air hostess
- Sohini Sengupta as Babli's aunt
- Koushik Sen as Nimesh Kaka
- Reshmi Sen as Nimesh Kaka's wife
- Sandip Bhattacharya as Author

== Marketing ==
The teaser of the film was released on 14 April 2024. The trailer was dropped on 3 August 2024 along with the announcement of new release date.

== Reception ==
=== Critical reception ===
Agnivo Niyogi of The Telegraph reviewed the film on a positive note and wrote "Raj Chakrabarty handles the intricacies of the relationship and the challenges that Babli and Abhirup face quite well." He also praised the cinematography, background score and director's vision for creating a visually stunning and emotionally resonant film but criticized some songs which seemed to forcefully inserted in the plot.

Subhasmita Kanji of the Hindustan Times rated the film 3.8 out of 5 stars and opined that Subhashree played her role with extreme precision, while Abir and the other cast were also aptly perfect in their roles. She specially praised the cinematographer of the film for beautifully portraying the vivid landforms but criticized the forceful insertion of some songs which had nothing to add to the plot.
