= Khoka 420 =

2013 Indian film by Rajib Biswas

- Khoka 420 Theatrical poster
- Directed by: Rajiv Kumar Biswas
- Written by: Subhadip Das
- Story by: Vamsi Paidipally
- Produced by: Ashok Dhanuka; Eskay Movies
- Starring: Dev; Subhashree; Nusrat; Tapas Paul; Rajatava Dutta; Haradhan Bandopadhyay
- Cinematography: Shrisha Roy
- Edited by: Mohammad Kalam Khan, Saikat Sengupta
- Music by: Rishi Chanda; Shree Pritam; Savvy; Shrijit
- Distributed by: Eskay Movies and Jalsha Movies Production
- Release date: 14 June 2013
- Running time: 157:38 minutes
- Country: India
- Language: Bengali
- Box office: ₹8 crore

Khoka 420 is a 2013 Indian Bengali-language romantic action comedy film directed by Rajib Biswas. The film stars Dev, Subhashree, Nusrat, Tapas Paul, Rajatava Dutta and others. The film is a remake of the 2010 Telugu film Brindavanam starring N. T. Rama Rao Jr., Samantha Ruth Prabhu and Kajal Agarwal. The film served as a spiritual sequel to the 2012 film Khokababu and the second installment of the Khokababu series. The film was dubbed into Hindi as "Mere Ustad 420".

The film was released in the theatres on 14 June 2013. It marked the last on screen appearance of the veteran Bengali actor Haradhan Banerjee. The film became a major commercial success and became one of the highest grossing Bengali films of 2013.

== Plot ==
Krish is the son of a rich man. He is romantically interested in Megha and Megha also loves Krish a.k.a. Krishna. Their relationship goes fine until Megha meets Bhoomi, and they become best friends. Bhoomi tells her best friend Megha about her rowdy and tough cousin who her family wants her to marry, but she does not want to. Megha gets worried about her friend and tells the problem to her boyfriend, Krish. Megha makes Bhoomi meet Krish and tells Krish to act as if he is Bhoomi's boyfriend and let Bhoomi's family know that Bhoomi is in a relationship with Krish. Krish does not agree at first but later agrees to help out Bhoomi.

In the meantime, Bhoomi fall in love with Krish in reality. Krish also gets close to Bhoomi. Later, one day Krish gets to know that Megha and Bhoomi's fathers are step-brothers and they have a family rivalry between them from ages. Krish meets the two brothers' father and gets to know why they have the rivalry and also gets to know that grandfather wants them to be together again. The grandfather gives the responsibility to Krish to get the two families together again and if he is successful he will get the hand in marriage of Megha or Bhoomi – whomever he is in love with. Krish falls in a big problem as he is not interested in all this family rivalry. But later he decides to get the family together. In the meantime, Megha gets the wrong idea that Krish and Bhoomi are cheating her and Krish is in love with Bhoomi and not her.

Due to the untimely death of Late Shri Haradhan Bandopadhay, the climax of the movie was changed which made it different from the original story of Brindavanam where Krish marries Bhoomi as Megha explained.

== Cast ==
- Dev as Krish
- Subhashree as Bhoomi
- Nusrat Jahan as Megha
- Tapas Paul as Brojeshwar Ganguly, Bhoomi's father
- Rajatava Dutta as Mohanlal Ganguly, Megha's father
- Haradhan Bandopadhyay as Bhoomi and Megha's grandfather
- Partho Sarathi Chakraborty as Hari
- Shubhajit Bhowmik as Krish's companion
- Supriyo Dutta as Krish's fake father
- Laboni Sarkar as Krish's mother
- Kunal Padhy as Krish's father
- Anjan Mahato as Kamol Bhai, Krish's driver
- Joy Badlani as Biju, Hari's father
- Pradip Dhar as Joy, Bhoomi's uncle
- Madhumita Chatterjee as Megha's mother

== Production ==
=== Development ===
The director Rajib Biswas informed that initially he planned to have only one music director for the film but later decided to sign in four. He gave the songs to the four music composers and asked them to work on the songs. After listening to their versions, Biswas decided to keep the best one of each of their renditions, which displayed their signature styles.

He also hired four choreographers for the film to add a different style of dance to each of the dance numbers in the movie. He also mentioned that added the song "Jai Govinda Jai" in the film, as a token of his offering and respect to Lord Krishna. Nusrat mentioned in an interview that she signed Khoka 420 as her next film, almost two years after her last film Shotru as she didn't find any interesting role in the more than hundred scripts she was offered after Shotru.

=== Filming ===
The film has been mostly shot across West Bengal and Hyderabad. Parts of the film, including one of the songs have been shot at Macau. Khoka 420 also became the first Bengali film to be shot in Macau.

=== Marketing ===
The team promoted their film across Kolkata. As a part of the promotions, Subhashree and Nusrat appeared on a special episode of the CID Kolkata Bureau show, telecasted on TV. In the show, a crazy fan Paritosh kidnapped them while they were going for the film and promotions and he also killed the driver of the car in which they were travelling. CID started the investigations and Paritosh proposed Subhashree to marry him in custody. Paritosh's elder brother Swaroop then unveils the true reasons for facilitating Paritosh in the kidnapping.

== Soundtrack ==
Khoka 420

Soundtrack album by Rishi Chanda, Shree Pritam, Savvy and Shrijit
- Released: May 2013
- Recorded: 2013
- Genre: Feature film soundtrack
- Label: Eskay Movies
- Producer: Ashok Dhanuka

The music of the film has been composed by Rishi Chanda, Shree Pritam, Savvy and Shrijit. The lyrics have been penned by Gautam Sushmit Shree Pritam, Smarajit Bandyopadhyay, Savvy and Priyo Chattopadhyay.

Song name	Singer	Lyricist	Composer
"Mad I Am Mad"	Mika Singh, Saberi Bhattacharya	Gautam Sushmit	Savvy
"Solid Case Kheyechhi"	Bappi Lahiri, Poornima Shrestha	Shree Pritam	Shree Pritam
"Bin Tere Tere Bin"	Zubeen Garg	Smarajit Bandyopadhyay	Shree Pritam
"Gobhir Joler Fish" (Title Track)	Abhijeet Bhattacharya, Akriti Kakkar	Savvy	Savvy
"O Bondhu Amar"	Shaan, Mahalakshmi Iyer	Gautam Sushmit	Srijit
"Jay Govinda Jay Gopala"	Abhijeet Bhattacharya, Mahalaxmi Iyer	Priyo Chattopadhyay	Rishi Chanda

== Reception ==
=== Box office ===
The film grossed ₹70 lakh on the opening day. At the end of its theatrical run, the film grossed ₹8 crore at the box office.

=== Critical reception ===
Khoka 420 opened with mixed to positive reviews from the audience and critics alike.

Jaya Biswas of the Times of India rated the film 3.5/5 stars and opined "The story is not new, but it is the packaging that makes Khoka 420 an interesting watch. The film has oodles of action and if you happen to be a Dev fan, give it a shot". Anurima Das gave the film 3/5 stars saying "Dev starrer Khoka 420 is a perfect family entertainment package filled with action, romance and drama, the film is definitely a good watch."

== Controversy ==
The makers were accused to copy one of the posters of the film from the 2012 Hindi film Barfi!.

== Sequel ==
After the success of the film, the producer Himanshu Dhanuka mentioned that they are planning for a third part of the film and continue the Khokababu series with Dev. But the sequel didn't happen for unknown reasons.
