= Nabab =

2017 film by Joydeep Mukherjee

- Theatrical release poster
- Directed by: Joydeep Mukherjee; Abdul Aziz
- Screenplay by: Pele Bhattacharya; Joydip Mukherjee
- Story by: Pele Bhattacharya
- Produced by: Abdul Aziz; Himanshu Dhanuka
- Starring: Shakib Khan; Subhashree; Amit Hasan
- Cinematography: Tuban
- Edited by: Somnath Dey
- Music by: Savvy; Akassh
- Production companies: Jaaz Multimedia; Eskay Movies
- Distributed by: Jaaz Multimedia; Eskay Movies
- Release dates: 26 June 2017 (Bangladesh); 28 July 2017 (India)
- Running time: 140 minutes
- Countries: Bangladesh; India
- Language: Bengali
- Budget: ₹5 crore
- Box office: ₹9.10 crore (equivalent to ₹13 crore or US$1.5 million in 2023)

Nabab is a 2017 Indo-Bangladeshi action thriller film directed by Joydip Mukherjee and produced by Abdul Aziz and Himanshu Dhanuka under the banner of Jaaz Multimedia and Eskay Movies. A remake of the Aamir Khan starrer 1995 film Baazi, the film features Shakib Khan in the title role, an intelligence agent tasked with a secret operation in West Bengal, and Subhashree Ganguly as a crime news reporter and Nabab's love interest. It also features Sabyasachi Chakrabarty, Amit Hasan, Aparajita Adhya, Kharaj Mukherjee and Arindam Saha in supporting roles.

The soundtrack album and background score of the film was composed by Savvy Gupta and Akassh. The film was released on 26 June 2017 on the occasion of Eid in Bangladesh and released in India on 28 July 2017. The film marks the second collaboration of Shakib Khan with Joydip Mukherjee after success of Shikari (2016). The film had a production budget of ৳5 crore (US$410,000) and earned ₹9.10 crore (equivalent to ₹13 crore or US$1.5 million in 2023) within the first five days of its release.

== Plot ==
A group of people travelling by bus later stop for a tea break and hooligans arrive at the same time. Suddenly, a passing convoy is attacked and the assassins try to kill the man inside one of the cars. The man using his swiftness foils the attack and manages to nab and arrest one of the attackers while killing another. The rest manage to escape the scene.

This man is Chief Investigating Officer Rajib Chowdhury (Shakib Khan) and the person in the car turns out to be Chief Minister Ananya Chatterjee (Aparajita Adhya) who was impressed with Rajib and delegates to him the task of locating the people behind a recent terrorist conspiracy to Rajib. Rajib promises to fulfill the job to the best of his ability.

Masud (Sagnik Chatterjee) a Muslim ACP is taken off from the Special Action Team when a notorious gangster Mustaq escapes his clutches. Despite being an honest and upright police officer with the best intelligence gathering network in the force, Masud is rueful that he is being given low class treatment because he is a Muslim and is being perceived as having let Mustaq escape because he was a Muslim as well. Rajib wants Masud on the team, but Masud refuses. It is revealed that Rajib's father Constable Shymal Chowdhury was killed by a terrorist in Bangladesh which motivated Rajib to join the police force.

Rajib escaped prison then went to the Commissioner's house to tell him the truth, but there he accused for the murder of the Commissioner. With the help of his love interest, Rajib reached to Mandal. But imprisoning his mother and a few colleagues Mandal trapped Rajib to kill CM in a high security zone.

== Cast ==
- Shakib Khan as Rajib Chowdhury aka Nabab, an intelligence agent from Bangladesh tasked with a secret operation in West Bengal, India
- Subhashree as Diya Banerjee aka Salma, a crime news reporter
- Aparajita Auddy as Ananya Chatterjee, a Chief Minister of West Bengal, India
- Arindam Ganguly as Krishanu Chatterjee, Ananya's husband
- Rajatava Dutta as Gautam Dasgupta, a commissioner of West Bengal Police
- Kharaj Mukherjee as Abhay Sarker, a Deputy Chief Minister, the main antagonist
- Amit Hasan as Kali Charan Hansda
- Sagnik Chatterjee as ACP Masood Akhtar, an assistant commissioner (ACP) of West Bengal police
- Biswanath Basu as Bimal Debnath, a superintendent of West Bengal police
- Sabyasachi Chakraborty as the chief journalist of a news agency
- Meghla Mukta as Meghla Dasgupta, daughter of commissioner Gautam Dasgupta
- Razu Sarkar
- Pradip Dhar as Subir Mondal
- Prasun Gain as Dinu
- Preetam
- Rebeka Rouf as Aruna Chowdhury, Nabab's mother
- Rajat Ganguly as Ali Amzad Khan Bahadur
- Badhon as Nabab's friend
- Mousumi Saha
- Komol Patekar as Terrorist
- Prashanta Samanta
- Jayanta Hore
- Saumita Das
- Arindam Saha as Terrorist

== Production ==
=== Filming ===
Before filming started Khan underwent extensive training for the action sequences and has reportedly lost 20 kg weight to fit as a counter-terrorism agent. The shooting schedule of Nabab commenced on 17 November 2016. The first phase of the film was shot in 10-day schedule and entirely filmed in Cox's Bazar. The second phase of the filming took place in Kolkata. The last phase of the film was filmed in Dhaka and Kolkata, and lasted 30-days. The entire film was shot on a 50-day schedule.

The film had a production budget of ৳4 crore (US$330,000)

The music of the film was shot at various locations in Kolkata. A romantic track sequence was shot at Kolkata film city.

== Release ==
Nabab released across 128 screens in Bangladesh on 26 June 2017 which is the widest release for any Bangladeshi film. Despite the release of two other films, Nabab opened on every multiplex in Bangladesh.

== Soundtrack ==
Nabab

Soundtrack album by Savvy and Akassh
- Released: 1 June 2017
- Recorded: 2016–2017
- Genre: Film soundtrack
- Length: 16:41
- Language: Bengali
- Label: Jaaz Multimedia Eskay Movies
- Producer: Abdul Aziz; Himanshu Dhanuka

Savvy chronology
Bibaho Diaries (2017)	Nabab (2017)	Rangbaz (2017)

Akassh chronology
Premi o Premi (2017)	Nabab (2017)	Ami Neta Hobo (2018)

The soundtrack for the film is composed by Savvy and Akassh. The music video of the song "Sholoana" was released on YouTube on 1 June 2017. The music video of the song "Jabo Niye" was released on 10 June 2017. The music video of the song "O DJ O DJ" was released on 18 June 2017. The music video of the song "Saiyyan Beimaan" was released on 13 July 2017.

The full soundtrack was released for digital streaming on Saavn on 1 June 2017.

=== Track listing ===
No.	Title	Lyrics	Singer(s)	Length
1.	"Sholoana"	Prasen	Shadaab Hashmi, Akriti Kakkar	3:51
2.	"Jabo Niye"	Prasen	Ankit Tiwari, Madhura Bhattacharya	3:48
3.	"O DJ O DJ"	Priyo Chattopadhyay	Kona, Akassh	3:11
4.	"Saiyyan Beimaan"	Prasen	Raza Ali Khan	3:14

== Reception ==
=== Box Office ===
The earned ₹9.10 crore (equivalent to ₹13 crore or US$1.5 million in 2023) within the first five days of its release.

=== Critical response ===
Sherif Al Sayar, a film analyst from Bangla Tribune, gave the film a rating of 1/5. He stated that the film deceives the audience, saying, "Nabab is a mix of Baazigar (1993), Sarfarosh (1999), and Shah Rukh Khan's Baadshah (1999). It has deceived all the viewers who have seen these three films." However, he praised Shakib Khan's performance, the cinematography, locations, and fight scenes in the film. Fahmidul Haque, a professor in the Department of Mass Communication and Journalism at Dhaka University, as well as a film critic and researcher, on Prothom Alo described the film as "an exciting movie with a mismatched story." While he praised the cinematography, fight scenes, and background music, he expressed dissatisfaction with the screenplay of the film. Film critic and lyricist Zahid Akbar from The Daily Star found weaknesses in the film's story, writing, "In the story of Nabab, pieces of other films' plots can be identified. The ending of Nabab bears a strong resemblance to the Hindi film Baadshah starring Shah Rukh Khan. The story also shares similarities with another Hindi film, Baazi. Additionally, those who have watched the Bangladeshi film Khoboradar, featuring Riaz and Purnima, will also be surprised by the story of Nabab. Director Joydip Mukherjee cannot convincingly claim that this is a film with an original story." Nevertheless, he praised Shakib Khan's attractive look and performance. In another review in The Daily Star, Amira Amin praised Shakib Khan's look, costume, performance, while she advised improving his dialogue delivery and Subhasree's acting skill. She wrote, "Shakib Khan is presented in a fresh and captivating look, highlighting the value of strong costume design. While his performance is commendable, there are areas where his dialogue delivery could improve. Subhasree, though glamorous in appearance, still needs to refine her acting skills. The film shares notable similarities with Shah Rukh Khan's Baadshah."

== Home video ==
The film was released on Bangladeshi popular video streaming platform Bioscope on October 10, 2019 under the distribution of Bongo BD. It was also available globally on Amazon Prime and Amazon Prime Video. Additionally, the film had its world premiere on Bangladeshi TV channel NTV on August 2, 2020.

== Controversy ==
After the release of trailers and songs from the film, different artists, producers, directors and 14 different film-related organizations in Bangladesh began to protest the release of Nabab. After claims by the protesters that the films 'broke' some of the rules of making joint ventures, the Censor Board of Bangladesh did not give clearance to release the films. In response, Jaaz Multimedia threatened to close down their cinema halls for Eid if their film would not be allowed to release. The protesters also involved Shakib Khan, the star of Nabab, who once went on the streets of Bangladesh to protest the release of Indian films. Khan, at a press conference by Jaaz Multimedia, defended his position and former protests with claims that he only protested against big-budget Hindi/Urdu, not Bengali joint venture films. After a few weeks of protests, the Censor Board gave clearance to the film to release, in time to release on the holiday of Eid.
