= Grihapravesh (2025 film) =

2025 Indian Bengali film

- Theatrical release poster
- Directed by: Indraadip Dasgupta
- Screenplay by: Indraadip Dasgupta
- Story by: Indraadip Dasgupta
- Produced by: Sameeran Das
- Starring: Kaushik Ganguly; Subhashree Ganguly; Jeetu Kamal; Rudranil Ghosh
- Cinematography: Pratip Mukhopadhyay
- Edited by: Sujay Dutta Ray
- Music by: Indraadip Dasgupta
- Production company: Kaleidoscope Entertainment Unlimited
- Distributed by: PVR Inox Pictures
- Release date: 13 June 2025
- Running time: 156 minutes
- Country: India
- Language: Bengali
- Box office: ₹2.16 crore

Grihapravesh is a 2025 Indian Bengali-language family romantic drama film written and directed by Indraadip Dasgupta. It is produced by Sameeran Das under the banner of Kaleidoscope. Dasgupta also composed the music and wrote the story, screenplay, and dialogues.

The film stars Kaushik Ganguly, Subhashree Ganguly, and Jeetu Kamal in the lead roles. Pratip Mukhopadhyay handled the cinematography, while editing was done by Sujay Dutta Ray.

== Plot ==
Set in a worn-down Rajbari located in North Calcutta, where time feels frozen. It centers on Apratim and his ailing wife, who reside within the aging structure, supported by a distant relative named Bilu and their devoted helper, Minati. The narrative focuses on their daughter-in-law, Titli, who plays a crucial role in maintaining the delicate balance of the household.

Following the mysterious disappearance of her husband Shubho shortly after their wedding—he had promised to return in three months—Titli takes on the responsibility of managing the home and caring for its elderly inhabitants. Amidst the weight of history that the Rajbari embodies, she finds solace in her friendship with Roshni. Seeking a fresh start, Titli makes the decision to transform the Rajbari into a homestay for the Durga Puja festival.

The arrival of her first guest, Meghdut, a Bengali doctor and photographer living abroad, introduces a new dynamic to her life. As the festivities unfold with vibrant lights and music, Titli experiences a resurgence of emotions, leading to transformative moments in her journey. The film explores themes of resilience, change, and the complexities of human relationships against the backdrop of a rich cultural heritage.

== Cast ==
- Kaushik Ganguly as Apratim Roy, a patriarch grappling with family secrets
- Subhashree Ganguly as Titli, a woman navigating loss and identity
- Jeetu Kamal as Meghdut Bose
- Rudranil Ghosh as Bilu
- Sohini Sengupta as Sreemati Roy
- Sneha Chatterjee
- Abir Chatterjee (cameo) as Pritam
- Suprovo Tagore as Shubho

== Production ==
Principal photography began in November 2024 in Kolkata. Director Indraadip Dasgupta aimed to blend musical storytelling with deep emotional narratives, drawing from his background as a composer. The trailer launched in May 2025 at a high-profile event where Dasgupta described it as "an exploration of identity through separation and longing".

== Music ==
The soundtrack of Grihapravesh has been composed by Indraadip Dasgupta. The lyrics have been penned by Prosen and Ritam Sen. The album includes one traditional Bengali folk song and two Rabindra Sangeet adaptations besides 7 original compositions by Dasgupta. The complete soundtrack was released under the label of SVF Music.

=== Track listing ===
No.	Title	Composer	Lyricist	Singer(s)	Length
1	"Meghpeon"	Indraadip Dasgupta	Prosen	Debayan Banerjee	6:17
2	"Saiyaan Bina"	Indraadip Dasgupta	Prosen	Armaan Rashid Khan, Antara Mitra	5:35
3	"Bhalobashar Paaley"	Indraadip Dasgupta	Prosen	Shreya Ghoshal, Debayan Banerjee	5:50
4	"Golpo Holo Shuru"	Indraadip Dasgupta	Prosen	Arijit Singh, Shreya Ghoshal, Armaan Rashid Khan	5:45
5	"Moner O Toh Mon Bhaalo Nei (Male version)"	Indraadip Dasgupta	Ritam Sen	Debayan Banerjee	4:20
6	"Moner O Toh Mon Bhaalo Nei (Female version)"	Indraadip Dasgupta	Ritam Sen	Madhubanti Bagchi	4:15
7	"Meghpeon (Female version)"	Indraadip Dasgupta	Prosen	Iman Chakraborty	5:55
8	"Amar Haat Bandhibi"	Traditional	Traditional	Satyaki Banerjee	3:58
9	"Aami Tomar Preme"	Rabindranath Tagore	Rabindranath Tagore	Jayati Chakraborty	4:33
10	"Bodhu Kon Aalo"	Rabindranath Tagore	Rabindranath Tagore	Amrita Singh	6:05

== Release ==
Grihapravesh was released theatrically on 13 June 2025 across West Bengal. The premiere event in Kolkata saw massive crowds, leading to security breaches when Subhashree Ganguly arrived. A special screening was attended by cricketer Sourav Ganguly and actor Jisshu Sengupta, creating viral social media moments.

== Reception ==
=== Box office ===
The film entered the ₹1 crore club within its first week and earned ₹1.57 crore in its first 19 days. Director Dasgupta called the commercial response "encouraging for content-driven cinema".

=== Critical response ===
Poorna Banerjee from The Times of India praises "Grihapravesh" as "a visually striking film set in a historical North Kolkata mansion preparing for Durga Puja. It follows Titli, who, after her husband Shubho disappears, learns to navigate her emotions as she manages a homestay. The film’s art direction and cinematography evoke longing and melancholy, while the music enhances its emotional depth." Banerjee notes "It’s a story of quiet transformation, highlighting personal desire and autonomy, though the second half could be tighter. Overall, it’s a gentle exploration of self-discovery." High on Films called it "a layered examination of identity through the lens of separation". Sangbad Pratidin particularly noted Subhashree Ganguly's "nuanced performance".

Anandabazar Patrika highlights "Grihapravesh" as "a poignant exploration of love and identity set in a North Kolkata family home. The film follows Titli, who grapples with her husband Shaon's abrupt departure shortly after their marriage. Her world shifts when Meghdoot, a paying guest, arrives, revealing connections to Shaon’s hidden identity. Subhashree delivers a powerful performance, capturing her character's emotional turmoil. The film adeptly showcases complex characters and themes of love and loneliness, even as Shaon's portrayal feels somewhat flat. With evocative cinematography and evocative music, "Grihapravesh" offers a deeply resonant narrative that reflects the intricacies of human relationships."

== Criticism ==
However, the film faced criticism from the LGBTQIA community for its portrayal of a gay character, deemed stereotypical and regressive.
