= Challenge (2009 film) =

2009 Indian Bengali film by Raj Chakraborty

- Theatrical Release Poster
- Directed by: Raj Chakraborty
- Written by: Raj Chakraborty
- Screenplay by: Raj Chakraborty; N. K. Salil
- Dialogues by: N. K. Salil
- Produced by: Shrikant Mohta
- Starring: Dev; Subhashree Ganguly; Rajatava Dutta; Biswajit Chakraborty; Kharaj Mukherjee; Supriyo Dutta; Laboni Sarkar; Tulika Basu; Debranjan Nag
- Narrated by: Sabyasachi Chakraborty
- Cinematography: Somak Mukherjee
- Edited by: Ravi Ranjan Maitra; Mainak Bhaumik
- Music by: Jeet Gannguli
- Production company: Shree Venkatesh Films
- Distributed by: Shree Venkatesh Films
- Release date: 20 March 2009
- Running time: 140 minutes
- Country: India
- Language: Bengali

Challenge is a 2009 Indian Bengali-language action film written and directed by Raj Chakraborty and produced by Shrikant Mohta under the banner of Shree Venkatesh Films. It is an official remake of Telugu-language film Dil (2003). The film stars Dev and Subhashree Ganguly in the lead roles, while Rajatava Dutta, Biswajit Chakraborty, Supriyo Dutta, Kharaj Mukherjee, Laboni Sarkar, Tulika Basu and Partha Sarathi Chakraborty play other pivotal roles. The soundtrack of the film was composed by Jeet Gannguli and cinematography was by Somak Mukherjee. The screenplay and dialogues were written by Raj Chakraborty and N. K. Salil.

== Plot ==
Abir joins college and comes across Pooja, the daughter of a ruthless businessman. Her father is strict and conservative in taking care of Pooja and does not tolerate if anyone, directly or indirectly, disturbs or approaches Pooja. Abir is bullied by a bunch of students and he pays them back in return by beating them all up. He also confronts her father's henchmen and makes them apologize when they misbehave with him before his fight with the students. Pooja is highly impressed on seeing this and she falls in love with him. He reciprocates and the two start dating. Pooja's father finds out about their relationship and opposes it. The rest of the story is how Abir and Pooja unite after a series of problems. It is revealed in the flashback that one of the classmates of Abir had spoken to Pooja which was seen by Kartik da, one of her father's henchmen. As a punishment, Kartik da had destroyed both of his eyes citing that even looking at Agnideb Sen's daughter is a crime. When Abir comes to know about this, he captures Kartik da in disguise and forcefully makes him donate his eyes to the classmate. Agnideb is furious at this and orders his henchmen to destroy Abir's house and threaten his parents of consequences if he is seen with Pooja again. Abir's father, who was always displeased with his son's casual nature, now supports him and tells that if he truly loves Pooja, he should go for her and don't worry about consequences. Agnideb leaves Pooja at his father-in-law's place but refuses to go himself as it is revealed he eloped and married Pooja's mom causing her father to pledge that he'd kill Agnideb if he sees him again. Abir manages to reach the place and convince Pooja's grandfather regarding the matter. Agnideb tries to cut off the marriage however, he is caught in many hilarious situations. When he reaches home, he finds that the marriage is on however, Abir approaches and tells him that he is his future father-in-law and that without his blessings, the marriage will not commence. Finally it is revealed that the mastermind behind Abir was Kartik da who used to pretend as if he is blind and take information from Agnideb about Pooja's whereabouts and report it to Abir. Kartik da tells that he got his eyes back from the same classmate's father who had died and Abir himself arranged for the eyes to be donated to him. This made Kartik da realise the importance of eyes and feels sorry for what he had done earlier. He teams up with Abir and tells him that he'd do anything to pay for the sins he committed. Agnideb finally realises his mistake and happily accepts Abir as his son-in-law and is seen playing with his grandson after the credits roll.

== Cast ==
- Dev as Abir Ganguly
- Subhashree Ganguly as Pooja Sen
- Rajatava Dutta as Agnideb Sen, Pooja's Father, an industrialist and a local don
- Tulika Basu as Chandra Sen, Pooja's Mother
- Biswajit Chakraborty as Samir Ganguly, Abir's Father
- Laboni Sarkar as Purnima Ganguly, Abir's Mother
- Kharaj Mukherjee as Gouranga 'Gour' Chatterjee, the Principal of the college
- Partha Sarathi Chakraborty as Gopal, Abir's friend
- Supriyo Dutta as Kartik Da, Agnideb's henchman
- Prasun Gain as Poncha, Kartik's assistant
- Pradip Dhar as Bhoja, Kartik's assistant
- Abhimanyu Mukherjee as Ranjan, Abir and Pooja's classmate
- Tamal Roy Chowdhury as Pooja's maternal grandfather
- Debranjan Nag as Bhajahari, the Postman of the college and Gour's friend

Special appearance

- Raj Chakraborty as himself
- Shweta Bhattacharya as a college student
- Subhankar Saha as one of the college rowdies
- Aritra Dutta Banik as a young tea seller

== Production ==
=== Pre-production ===
After the success of Chirodini ...Tumi Je Amar (2008), Raj Chakraborty became a leading director in the industry. During the end of 2008, Sangeet Bangla reported that his next project was going to be a mass-class combo film with a strong social message, which was being written by N.K Salil. After the completion of the script, in January 2009, the film's title was revealed to be Challenge with the music composed by Jeet Gannguli.

=== Casting ===
Since the initial position, Chakraborty's choice was Dev to play the protagonist in the film as he worked with him for the song Pante Taali in Chirodini ... Tumi Je Amar before. Subhashree Ganguly, who acted opposite Soham Chakraborty in the film Bajimaat (2008) before, was signed to play the lead opposite Dev. For an important role, Rajatava Dutta was signed and for the other supporting roles, Supriyo Dutta, Kharaj Mukherjee, Debranjan Nag, Biswajit Chakraborty and others were reported to be in.

=== Shooting ===
The filming took place in Kolkata and the outskirts of Purulia. The song Bhojo Gourango was shot in a hotel of Mumbai featuring Dev and the choreographer Duraiswamy Shankaraiyaa. In Dubai, the song Mahi Ve was shot marking the first Bengali film to be filmed there. The interval and climax action scene was shot in Purulia.

== Soundtrack ==
Challenge

Soundtrack album by Jeet Gannguli
- Released: 2009
- Recorded: 2008
- Studio: Shree Venkatesh Films
- Genre: Film soundtrack
- Language: Bengali
- Label: SVF
- Producer: Shree Venkatesh Films

Jeet Gannguli chronology
Jackpot (2009)	Challenge (2009)	Paran Jai Jaliya Re (2009)

Singles from Challenge
- 1. "Mahi Ve" Released: 5 Mar 2016; 2. "Bondhura Elomelo" Released: 19 Mar 2016; 3. "Dekhechi Tomake" Released: 22 Mar 2016; 4. "Bhojo Gourango" Released: 27 Feb 2016

The soundtrack of the film was composed by Jeet Gannguli, while the background score was by S.P Venkatesh. The lyrics were penned by Nachiketa Chakraborty, Priyo Chattopadhyay, Dipangshu Acharyaa, Abhimanyu Mukherjee and Gautam Sushmit.

No.	Title	Lyrics	Music	Singer(s)	Length
1.	"Challenge Nibi Na Sala"	Abhimanyu Mukherjee	Jeet Gannguli	Jeet Gannguli	2:33
2.	"Bhojo Gourango"	Priyo Chattopadhyay	Jeet Gannguli	Jeet Gannguli; Earl Edgar	3:26
3.	"Bondhura Elomelo"	Dipangshu Acharyaa	Jeet Gannguli	Dibyendu Mukherjee; Satabdi Chakraborty	4:38
4.	"Mahi Ve"	Gautam Sushmit	Jeet Gannguli	Kunal Ganjawala	4:38
5.	"Janina"	Nachiketa Chakraborty	Jeet Gannguli	Nachiketa Chakraborty	5:15
6.	"Dekhechi Tomake"	Priyo Chattopadhyay	Jeet Gannguli	Shaan; June Banerjee	3:53
Total length:					24:23

== Spin-off Sequel ==
Challenge 2 (2012) with no similarities to the previous one. Raj Chakraborty did a cameo appearance in the film.
