= Parineeta (2019 film) =

Bengali romantic-thriller film directed by Raj Chakraborty

- Film poster (photographed by Kaustav Sarkar)
- Directed by: Raj Chakraborty
- Screenplay by: Padmanabha Dasgupta
- Story by: Priyanka Poddar; Arnab Bhowmick
- Produced by: Raj Chakraborty
- Starring: Subhashree Ganguly; Ritwick Chakraborty; Gaurav Chakrabarty; Falaque Rashid Roy; Adrit Roy
- Cinematography: Manas Ganguly
- Edited by: Sanglap Bhowmik
- Music by: Arko
- Production company: Raj Chakraborty Productions
- Release date: 6 September 2019
- Country: India
- Language: Bengali
- Budget: ₹90 Lakhs
- Box office: est. ₹2.3 crore

Parineeta is a 2019 Indian Bengali vigilante romantic thriller film co-written, produced and directed by Raj Chakraborty under the banner Raj Chakraborty Productions. The film illustrates love break up, revenge urban love story and false allegations against men – with Subhashree Ganguly, Ritwick Chakraborty, Gaurav Chakrabarty and Falaque Rashid Roy. Adrit Roy played a pivotal role in the film.

The music of the film is composed by Arko Pravo Mukherjee. The film was theatrically released on 6 September 2019. and was streamed on the OTT platform ZEE5. The film earned ₹2.3 crore worldwide and Subhashree received Best Actress at West Bengal Film Journalists' Association Awards & Filmfare Best Actress award. The song "Tomake" sung by Shreya Ghoshal was one of the most popular Bengali songs of 2019 which also got the best song award.

== Plot ==
2015: Mehul is infatuated with her tuition teacher, Babaida. Mehul believes Babaida reciprocates her feelings. Babaida tells her that he has something to say to her and she assumes he is going to propose. On Holi, while she is waiting on the terrace (with abeer and vermillion), Babaida introduces Sayantika, his new girlfriend. He puts the abeer and vermillion on Mehul and tells her that she has to shoulder the responsibility of not just him but his better half too. Mehul is heartbroken and starts avoiding him. One day, a distressed Babaida hands her a letter, which she takes reluctantly. Three months later, she is told that Babaida committed suicide. After seeing his body, she breaks down.

2019: Four years later, Mehul is working in a government company with a low-paid salary with which she sustains two households - her own and Babaida's, where only his bedridden mother lives. Her colleague Ananda encourages her to go to an interview at a big corporate company called Unicorn. Mehul does so and is hired. On her first day, she meets her boss, a young man, Ranadeb. Mehul gives herself a makeover, dressing more provocatively and boldly, and catches Ranadeb's attention. Babaida's mother dies in the meantime. One day, Ranadeb invites her for dinner and tries to sleep with her. Suddenly, his phone rings and Mehul sees his wife is calling him: Sayantika, Babaida's girlfriend. When she provokes him, Ranadeb asks her who she is and attempts to rape her but she escapes.

In the next scene, she runs to a police station in bare feet, messed makeup, and her dress torn, indicating that she was raped. It is then that the mystery behind Babaida's suicide unfolds.

In 2015, from the letter he gave her, Mehul learned that Babaida and Sayantika were college friends and had entered Unicorn as interns. Sayantika started to change after Ranadeb began showing interest in her. She took advantage of her charm by attracting Ranadeb. The following day, Sayan learns that one of his colleagues failed to secure job, and his salary was given to Sayantika. Following this, Babaida entered Ranadeb's cabin to find Sayantika and Ranadeb making out. Enraged, he attacks Ranadeb. Sayantika and Ranadeb conspired against Babaida. Sayantika ran to the police station and falsely accused Babaida of raping her, for which Babaida gets arrested and had to face legal charges. The rape charge was much too severe to that it destroyed his career in letter he mentioned that he tried to contact her many times as his last hope but failed to contact felling hopeless he committed suicide. Sayantika and Ranadeb married after Babaida's death. Before dying, he figured only Mehul would believe him as she loves him.

In present day, Mehul accuses Ranadeb of attempt of rape and gets him arrested. He and Sayantika are also charged with fraudulence and money laundering and cheating following which Ranadeb is sacked from his position and even police also arrest Sayantika, following which Mehul also files a Petition in High Court demanding investigation on Babaida's suicide and Fake Allegation case that 5 years ago Sayan was falsely charged for rape following which he committed suicide. The media reported If the allegations are found out to be true Ranadeb and Sayantika will be charged for leveling false allegation, criminal conspiracy, abetment of suicide and culpable homicide for which they can also face serious charges including death by hanging as punishment. Thus, it becomes clear that Mehul had entered the company with a motive to avenge Babaida's death. At the end, she speaks to Babaida's portrait and tells him that she considered herself his wife as he had put vermillion on her head (which was mixed with the red Abir) that day on Holi, four years ago. Being his wife, it was her duty to give him justice, and that she executed the vengeance successfully.

== Cast ==
- Ritwick Chakraborty as Babaida/ Sayan Roy
- Subhashree Ganguly as Mehul Bose
- Gaurav Chakrabarty as Ranadev Sen
- Falaque Rashid Roy as Sayantika Sen
- Biswajit Chakraborty as Mehul's father
- Laboni Sarkar as Babai's mother
- Tulika Basu as Mehul's mother
- Samiul Alam as Mehul's brother
- Adrija Roy as Tusu, Mehul's friend
- Tithi Das as Motu
- Soumi Paul as Riya as Mehul's office colleague
- Adrit Roy as Ananda (guest appearance)

== Marketing and release ==
The official trailer of the film was unveiled by Raj Chakraborty Entertainment Pvt. Ltd. on 4 July 2019.

It was theatrically released on 6 September 2019. The film was released to widespread acclaim. The movie was highly appreciated by critics as well as masses & received positive to mixed reviews. Raj Chakraborty remade it in hindi in form of web series with significant changes in the story titled Ziddi Ishq in 2025. This also marked Raj's Hindi debut.

== Awards and nominations ==
At the WBFJA Awards the film won the award Best Actress for Ganguly. At the "Films & Frames Digital Awards", Parineeta won a leading six awards out of a leading 7 nominations: Best Film, Best Director, Best Actress for Ganguly, Best Playback Singer Female for Shreya Ghoshal, Best Music Director & Best song Tomake.

== Soundtrack ==
Parineeta

Soundtrack album by Arko
- Released: 27 July 2019
- Recorded: 2018
- Studio: AudioGarage studios
- Genre: Feature film soundtrack
- Label: Raj Chakraborty Entertainment

Arko chronology
Shesh Theke Shuru (2019)	Parineeta (2019)	Shantilal O Projapoti Rohoshyo (2019)

Singles from Parineeta
- 1. "Tomake (তোমাকে) (Female)" Released: 13 Jul 2019; 2. ""Shei Tumi" (সেই তুমি)" Released: 27 Jul 2019

The music of the soundtrack composed by Arko on his own lyrics.

All lyrics are written by Arko; all music is composed by Arko.

Track list
No.	Title	Singer	Length
1.	"Tomake (Female)"	Shreya Ghoshal	2:56
2.	"Shei Tumi"	Arko	3:41
3.	"Tomake (Male)"	Arko	2:56
