= Sharthopor =

2025 Indian Bengali film by Annapurna Basu

- Announcement poster
- Directed by: Annapurna Basu
- Screenplay by: Sadeep Bhattacharjee
- Story by: Sadeep Bhattacharjee
- Produced by: Surinder Singh; Nispal Singh
- Starring: Koel Mallick; Koushik Sen; Ranjit Mallick; Anirban Chakrabarti
- Cinematography: Anup Singh
- Edited by: Subhajit Singha
- Music by: Jeet Ganguly
- Production company: Surinder Films
- Distributed by: Surinder Films
- Release date: 21 October 2025
- Running time: 135 minutes
- Country: India
- Language: Bengali
- Budget: ₹1.70 crore
- Box office: ₹2.30 crore

Sharthopor (transl. Selfish) is a 2025 Indian Bengali-language drama film directed by debutant Annapurna Basu. Written by Sadeep Bhattacharjee, it has been produced by Surinder Singh and Nispal Singh under the banner of Surinder Films. It deals with the fallen relationship between two siblings, which arose regarding the inheritance of ancestral property.

The film stars Koel Mallick and Koushik Sen in the lead roles while Ranjit Mallick and Anirban Chakrabarti play other pivotal roles. Sharthopor reunited Koel and Ranjit Mallick 16 years after Saat Paake Bandha (2009). The music has been composed by Jeet Ganguly. It was released in the theatres on 21 October 2025. The film emerged as a box office success.

== Synopsis ==
Sharthopor revolves around the emotional drama that arose between two siblings, Aparna and Sourav, regarding the inheritance of their ancestral home in Ganganagar post their parent's death. Aparna unknowingly signed a no objection certificate given by Sourav, which mentioned that he is converting a part of the house into a commercial venture, like a bed and breakfast. To establish an identity beyond her domestic role and assert her legal right to parental property, she filed a court complaint against her elder brother. The film follows a legal courtroom drama that forces the entire family to confront their traditional beliefs on parental property inheritance, making everyone realize the essence of shared heritage that transcends the age-old gender roles.

== Cast ==
- Koel Mallick as Aparna Ghosal
- Ranjit Mallick as GK Laha, Aparna's lawyer
- Koushik Sen as Sourav Basu, Aparna's elder brother
- Anirban Chakrabarti as Tarak Halder, Sourav's lawyer
- Indrajit Chakravarty as Debarshi Ghosal, Aparna's husband
- Ayushmita Chakraborty as Aparna and Debarshi's daughter
- Ananya Sen
- Biswajit Chakraborty
- Anirban Bhattacharya
- Saoli Chattopadhyay
- Anumegha Kahali
- Rajanya Das
- Papiya Sen
- Mishka Halim
- Ankit Majumdar
- Turjo
- Chitra Vanu Basu
- Aparupa Banerjee
- Bimal Giri
- Poulomi Sengupta

== Production ==
=== Announcement ===
The film was announced with a motion poster on 23 September 2025. It revealed Koel Mallick and Koushik Sen in lead roles as siblings, performing Bhai Phonta.

=== Development ===
Director Annapurna Basu and scriptwriter Sadeep Bhattacharjee came to Surinder Films' office to narrate the script to Koel Mallick. Besides Sharthopor, they also narrated a few more scripts. Amongst all, Koel liked Sharthopor the most because she felt that its theme would be relatable to many people. Koel said in an interview that she immediately said "yes" to the film after one-time narration by the director-scriptwriter duo.

In an interview, Koel said that when the script was being narrated to her, she felt that one of the characters was very similar to her father in real life. They hadn't developed the character very well till then. She asked them to develop the character and then offer the role to her father, Ranjit Mallick.

=== Filming ===
The filming started on 19 July 2024. In an interview, Koel mentioned that in most of the scenes, her character has used the bare minimum of make up and kept a simple hair bun in order to make the character relatable to the audience. Ranjit Mallick joined the shoot in the last leg of the filming schedule.

== Music ==
The music of the film has been composed by Jeet Ganguly while the background score has been composed by Amit Chatterjee. The lyrics have been penned by Prasen and Ritam Sen.

The first song "Bhenge Jay" was released on 11 October 2025. It depicts the falling relationship between the siblings. The second single "Sujan Majhi Re" was released on 18 October 2025. It depicts the alienation of a girl from her own home, post her marriage. The third song "Ei Shon" was released on 31 October 2025.

== Release ==
The film was initially scheduled to release in the first half of 2025. It was released in the theatres on 21 October 2025, on the occasion of Bhai Phonta.

== Marketing ==
The teaser of the film was released on 26 September 2025. The trailer for the film was released on 9 October 2025. The special screening of the film was held at the South City Mall in South Kolkata on 24 October 2025.

== Reception ==
=== Critical reception ===
Sandipta Bhanja of Sangbad Pratidin reviewed the film and wrote "Director Annapurna Basu must be praised for depicting the arrogance of the selfish patriarchal society, in her debut film." She praised Koel Mallick and Koushik Sen's acting, Basu's direction, the screenplay, the courtroom duel between Anirban Chakrabarti and Ranjit Mallick and the music of the film.

A critic from The Telegraph reviewed the film and opined "Sharthopor isn’t a film about property law or court verdicts — it’s about reconciliation. Basu approaches the premise with nuance but keeps melodrama to a minimum. The film moves with the rhythm of real life — sometimes slow, sometimes sharp, yet always full of emotions and relatable." She praised the bitter sibling bonding between Koel and Koushik and the performances of the ensemble cast but bemoaned the conventional happy ending.

Raj Chakraborty reviewed the film and highlighted "A very beautifully made film and a very contemporary story has emerged through a suitable screenplay." She praised the direction, editing, cinematography, Koel's performance as a common woman, the tension between the characters played by Koel Mallick and Koushik Sen, apt accompaniment by Ranjit Mallick and Anirban Chakrabarti, and the songs composed by Jeet Ganguly.

Pooorna Banerjee of The Times of India rated the film 4/5 stars and noted "What director Annapurna Basu achieves with Sharthopor is a remarkable exploration of the human psyche, unfolding slowly and patiently over the course of this two-hour-plus film." She praised the character development for all the lead actors in the story, Koushik Sen's subtle portrayal as Sourav, Ranjit Mallick and Anirban Chakrabarti's performances, Anup Singh's cinematography and Jeet Ganguly's music. She added that this film is one of Koel Mallick's finest performances till date. But she bemoaned the occasional slowing of the pace.

Souvik Saha from Cine Kolkata rated the film 3.5/5 stars and wrote "Sharthopor is not a conventional entertainer — it is a reflective, intimate film that mirrors the conflicts hidden within many families. It is best experienced with patience and openness, rewarding viewers with performances and emotions that linger long after the credits roll." He applauded the performance of the whole cast: specially Koel and Kousik, the relevant theme which has been presented without over-dramatization and the cinematography but criticized the slow pace and also mentioned that the storyline could have been better.
