= Paran Jai Jaliya Re =

2009 Indian Bengali film by Ravi Kinnagi

- Poster of Paran Jai Jaliya Re
- Directed by: Rabi Kinagi
- Written by: N.K. Salil; Suresh Nair
- Produced by: Srikant Mohta
- Starring: Dev; Subhashree
- Cinematography: Kumud Verma
- Edited by: Rabi Ranjan Maitra
- Music by: Jeet Gannguli
- Production company: Shree Venkatesh Films
- Distributed by: Shree Venkatesh Films
- Release date: 31 July 2009
- Running time: 140 minutes
- Country: India
- Language: Bengali
- Box office: ₹ 9.50 crore

Paran Jai Jaliya Re (transl. My Heart is Set on Fire) is a 2009 Indian Bengali-language romance film directed by Ravi Kinnagi. This film stars Dev and Subhashree in the lead roles. It is a remake of 2007 Hindi film Namastey London. Vipul Shah, the director of the original movie, filed a case against the producers of Paran Jai Jaliya Re and they gave a penalty of Rs. 75 lakh. In this film, Dev and Subhashree were cast together for the second time after Challenge in 2009.

== Plot ==
Anna is an NRI girl living in London whose father wants her to marry an Indian lad. However, Anna is deeply involved in a platonic relationship with a half-British boy Harry. Anna's brother, Sid is in a relationship with a British girl and wants to marry her. However, his father refuses to let him marry her which makes Sid choose to leave his parents' home. Meanwhile, Anna's father manages to bring his wife and daughter to India where he can find a suitable groom for his daughter. They meet Raj, a quintessential charming Bengali lad who falls in love with Anna and their marriage is finalized since Raj's father is an old friend of Anna's dad. However, although Anna likes Raj, she hatches a plan to delay and finally annul the engagement by implementing her brother's plan of bringing Raj to London and 'breaking up' with him abroad. Now in a foreign land, Raj tackles the adversities before him to win over Anna and marry her at last. After such situations, Harry's true nature is revealed when he misbehaves with Anna and Raj stops it. At last, he and Anna marry and live happily ever after.

== Cast ==
- Dev as Raj
- Subhashree as Anamika "Anna" Banerjee
- Rahul Banerjee as Vivek (in a guest appearance)
- Tota Roy Chowdhury as Siddharth "Sid" Banerjee
- Maryam as Liza, Siddharth's wife
- Biswajit Chakraborty as Ranjit Bannerjee, Anna's father
- Laboni Sarkar as Maya Banerjee, Anna's mother
- Aritra Dutta Banik as Chhoton (Raj's cousin)
- Bodhisattva Majumdar as Ajay, Raj's father
- Mousumi Saha as Raj's mother
- Locket Chatterjee as Seema, Raj's aunt
- Rajat Ganguly as Himangshu (Ranjit's friend)
- Mita Chatterjee as Raj's grandmother
- Shaan as Harry

== Soundtrack ==
Paran Jai Jaliya Re

Soundtrack album by Jeet Gannguli
- Released: 2009
- Recorded: 2008
- Studio: Shree Venkatesh Films
- Genre: Feature film soundtrack
- Language: Bengali
- Label: SVF
- Producer: Shree Venkatesh Films

Jeet Gannguli chronology
Challenge (2009)	Paran Jai Jaliya Re (2009)	Neel Akasher Chandni (2009)

Singles from Paran Jai Jaliya Re
- 1. "Poran Jai Jolia Re Title Track" Released: 20 Jun 2009; 2. "Mon Jane" Released: 1 Jul 2009; 3. "Dhaker Taley" Released: 13 Sep 2018; 4. "Swapno Nil" Released: 31 Jan 2019; 5. "Chokher Jole" Released: 31 Jan 2019

The biggest hit was "Chokher Jole" sung by Zubeen Garg.

All lyrics are written by Gautam Sushmit, Priyo Chattopadhyay; all music is composed by Jeet Gannguli.

No.	Title	Lyrics	Singer(s)	Length
1.	"Chokher Jole"	Priyo Chattopadhyay	Zubeen Garg	5:10
2.	"Swapno Nil"	Gautam Susmit	Jeet Gannguli	4:08
3.	"Mon Jane"	Gautam Sushmit	Shaan, June Banerjee	4:17
4.	"Dhaker Taley"	Priyo Chattopadhyay	Abhijeet Bhattacharya, Parinita, Sudipto & Chorus	4:51
5.	"Poran Jai Jolia Re Title Track"	Gautam Sushmit	Jeet Gannguli	4:57
6.	"Paran Jai Jaliya Re (Remix)"	Gautam Sushmit	Jeet Gannguli

== Controversy ==
The producers of the movie were sued for plagiarism soon after the release of the film by Vipul Shah who produced Namastey London who alleged that the plot was his film. The film was banned from screening twice, once by a lower court and later by Calcutta High Court. After the High Court decision, the producers came to a settlement after Shree Venkatesh Films agreed to pay a fine of seventy-five lakh (7.5 million) rupees. This out-of-court settlement can be considered hefty since the making of the film took about 2 crore (20 million) rupees. Moreover, the settlement required the movie to display a title card stating 'Based on Namastey London, a film by Vipul Amrutlal Shah'.
