= Chaitali =

Chaitali may refer to:

- Chaitali (poetry collection), a late 19th-century collection of poems by Rabindranath Tagore
- Chaitali (film), a 1975 Hindi film directed by Hrishikesh Mukherjee
- Chaitali Chakrabarti (active 2012), electrical engineer
