= Ek Akasher Niche =

Indian television series

- Genre: Indian Soap Opera; Drama; Family
- Created by: Ravi Ojha Productions
- Screenplay by: Mitali Bhattacharya; Anuja Chatterjee; Aditi Majumdar
- Story by: Mitali Bhattacharya; Anuja Chatterjee; Aditi Majumdar
- Directed by: Anindya Banerjee
- Starring: Sumitra Mukherjee; Chaiti Ghoshal
- Country of origin: India
- Original language: Bengali
- No. of episodes: 1178

Production
- Producer: Ravi Ojha
- Production location: Kolkata

Original release
- Network: Alpha Bangla (now Zee Bangla)
- Release: 24 July 2000 – 28 January 2005

Ek Akasher Niche is a Bengali-language family drama television serial, which aired on Alpha Bangla. It was produced under the banner of Ravi Ojha Productions. One of the longest running Bengali television soap opera, the story is about a middle-class family that deals with various challenges and complications on a daily basis and fights all odds to stay united. With over a thousand episodes that aired in early 2000s the serial was a mega-blockbuster hit in Bengal and other Bengali language dominant parts of the world.

Starring an extensive cast with actors like Saswata Chatterjee, Chaiti Ghoshal, Parambrata Chattopadhyay, Swastika Mukherjee and Mansi Bhatia, this Bengali TV show ran for several years amassing a huge fan following.

== Cast ==
- Sumitra Mukherjee / Soma Dey as Amma.
- Gita Dey as Amma's Thammi
- Partha Sarathi Deb / Arindam Sil as Ajoy
- Chaiti Ghoshal as Madhabi
- Rajatava Dutta as Atul
- Sudipa Basu/ Indrani Basu as Anita
- Saswata Chatterjee as Akash
- Rumni Sengupta / Aditi Chatterjee / Debolina Dutta as Nandini
- Rita Dutta Chakraborty as Raj
- Kunal Mitra as Aniket
- Mansi Bhatia as Nidhi (Aniket's adopted daughter)
- Rupanjana Mitra as Mohini
- Aparajita Auddy as Minu
- Badshah Maitra as Bhaskar / Palash
- Aritra Dutta as Ani
- Kamalika Banerjee as Chhutki
- Shantilal Mukherjee as Saibal
- Kalyan Chatterjee as Kanai
- Rumki Chatterjee as Toru
- Koneenica Banerjee as Pakhi
- Samata Das as Tuski
- Swastika Mukherjee as Piu
- Bhaswar Chatterjee as Indra
- Parambrata Chattopadhyay as Shayan
- Abir Chatterjee as Rangan
- Sananda Basak / Monami Ghosh as Zeenat
- Kharaj Mukherjee as Dr. Rajat Ganguly
- Baishakhi Marjit as Dr. Oindrila Sarkar
- Tulika Basu as Rama/Elora Sarkar
- Sourabh Das as Elora's son
- Koushik Sen as Rittik
- Suneeta Sengupta as Julia
- Chitra Sen as Julia's Thammi
- Rimjhim Mitra as Neela Julia's roommate
- Pushpita Mukherjee as Dr. Mallika Basu/ Moli
- Mithu Chakrabarty as Dr. Mallika Basu's mother
- Arunima Ghosh as Smita
- Soma Banerjee as Manashi
- Chaitali Chakrabarty
- Rita Koiral as Gulabi, Zeenat's mother
- Dipankar Dey as Dr. Bijon Bose
- Anashua Majumdar as Mrs. Bijon Bose
- Rana Mitra
- Ardhendu Banerjee as Dr.Sanyal
- Debshankar Haldar as Palash's brother
- Rudranil Ghosh as Probal
- Gouri Sankar Panda as Saibal's father
- Chhanda Karanjee Chatterjee as Saibal's mother
- Alokananda Roy as Nandini's Mother
- Dwijen Bandopadhyay as Bhaskar's Father
- Urmimala Basu as Bhaskar's Mother
- Tamal Roy Choudhury as Public Procecutor
- Nandini Ghoshal as Indira
- Biplab Bandopadhyay as Joy
- Milan Roy Choudhury as Dibyendu
- Meghna Halder as Rupa
- Papiya Sen as Rupa's Mother
- Moumita Gupta as Indra's Mother
- Sudip Mukherjee as Sisir, Saibal's Cousin Brother
- Rupali Ganguly
- Barun Chanda as Mr. Dutta
- Chandan Sen as Manoj
- Biswajit Chakroborty as Mr. Dattaburman, local counsellor
- Arindam Saha Played two different characters (Bihari caretaker and Murderer/Goon)
- Dilip Ray as Ambarbabu, patient
- Krishnakishore Mukherjee as Mr.Sengupta Rahul's (patient) father
- Pradip Mukherjee as Bimal Ghosh aka Mallik Babu
- Santu Mukherjee / Meghnad Bhattacharya as Arjun, Madhabi's elder brother
- Sonali Chakraborty as Radha, Arjun's wife, Madhabi's sister in law
- Tanima Sen as Mrs. Talapatra, neighbour of Dasgupta family
- Joy Badlani as Kaliya, a goon
