= Rupanjana Mitra =

Indian actress

- Born: 18 October 1980 (age 46); Calcutta, West Bengal, India
- Occupations: Actress; Politician
- Years active: 2000–present
- Notable work: Anurager Chhowa; Behula (TV series); Tumi Ashbe Bole
- Political party: Trinamool Congress (2025–present)
- Other political affiliations: Bharatiya Janata Party (2019–2025)
- Spouse(s): Rezaul Hauqe (m. 2007; div. 2018) Ratool Mukherjee (m. 2024)

Rupanjana Mitra is an Indian actress and politician who works primarily in the Bengali film and television.

== Biography ==
Mitra has been working in Bengali film and television since 2000.

She married Rezaul Hauqe in 2007 and for divorced in 2018. Later she married Ratool Mukherjee in 2024.

== Political career ==
Mitra was a member of the All India Trinamool Congress before joining the Bharatiya Janata Party in July 2019. She was a member of BJP from 2019 to 2025. On 21 July 2025, she joined the Trinamool Congress at their annual 21 July Martyr's Day Rally.

== Filmography ==
- All films are in Bengali language, unless otherwise mentioned.

Year	Film	Role	Director	Notes	Ref.
2005	Dadar Adesh	Jhumaa Roy	Anup Sengupta		
2009	Premer Phande Kakatua	—N/a	Sanghamitra Chowdhury		
2009	Magno Mainak	Uncredited appearance	Swapan Ghosal		
2011	Teen Tanaya	Binu	Sukla Mitra	Character adapted from the poem "Phaki"	
2011	Katakuti	Shubro's wife	Premangshu Roy		
2019	Panther: Hindustan Meri Jaan	Sumitra Sanyal, the Defence Minister	Anshuman Pratyush		
2022	Ikir Mikir	Surasha Chatterjee	Ratool Mukherjee		
2024	Kaliachak Chapter 1	Sudha Malakar	Ratool Mukherjee		
2025	'Bhuto' Purbo	Matu Pagli	Kakoli Ghosh and Avinab Mukherjee		

== Television ==
Year	Title	Role	Channels
1997–2002	Janmabhumi	Tamalika	DD Bangla
2000–2005	Ek Akasher Niche	Mohini	Zee Bangla
2003–2007	Tithir Atithi	Niki Bose	ETV Bangla
2006–2007	Khela	Manjari	Zee Bangla
2008–2010	Durga	Neela	Star Jalsha
2010–2011	Behula	Shanoka	Star Jalsha
2010	Sindoorkhela	Debi (later Replaced by Chandrayee Ghosh)	Star Jalsha
2012	Checkmate	Mohini	Star Jalsha
2012-2014	Aanchol	Gita Sen (Main Antagonist)	Star Jalsha
2012-2014	Soti	Mohini	Zee Bangla
2014-2016	Tumi Asbe Bole	Rupanjana (Main Antagonist)	Star Jalsha
2017-2018	Premer Kahini	Bijaylakshmi	Star Jalsha
2018	Jai Kanhaiya Lal Ki (Hindi)	Sandhya Nath Chaudhary	Star Bharat
2022-2024	Anurager Chhowa	Labanya Lahiri Sengupta	Star Jalsha
2025	Putul TTP	Kamalika	Sun Bangla

== Web series ==
- All web series are in Bengali language, unless otherwise mentioned.

Year	Title	Role	Director	Platform	Notes	Ref.
2018	Dhanbad Blues	Shakira Bibi	Sourav Chakraborty	Hoichoi	Marked her debut in web series	
2019	Bou Keno Psycho	—N/a	Debaloy Bhattacharya	Hoichoi		
2021	Shei Je Holud Pakhi	Inspector Anuradha	Anirban Mallick	Hoichoi	Joined the series in its second season	
2024	Kaalratri	Indrani Roy Barman	Ayan Chakraborti	Hoichoi		
2025	Advocate Achinta Aich	Nina Chatterjee	Joydeep Mukherjee	Hoichoi	Joined the series in its second season	
2024	Kaalratri 2	Indrani Roy Barman	Ayan Chakraborti	Hoichoi		

== Awards ==
Year	Award	Category	Character	Film/TV show
2015	Star Jalsha Parivaar Awards 2015	Sera Khalnayika	Rupanjana	Tumi Asbe Bole
2022	Star Jalsha Parivaar Awards 2022	Priyo Maa	Labonyo	Anurager Chhowa
2023	West Bengal Telly Academy Awards 2023	Sera Sashuri	Labonyo	Anurager Chhowa
2024	Star Jalsha Parivaar Awards 2024	Sera Sashuri	Labonyo	Anurager Chhowa
2024	BFTA Awards	Best Supporting Actor (Female)	Labonyo	Anurager Chhowa

== See also ==
- Bidipta Chakraborty
- Churni Ganguly
