= Kaliachak Chapter 1 =

2024 Indian crime thriller film

- Directed by: Ratool Mukherjee
- Written by: Atanu Tanuj Ghosh
- Produced by: Nayan Raj; Asim Aktar
- Starring: Asim Aktar; Rupanjana Mitra; Partha Sarathi; Deboprasad Haldar; Debapratim Dasgupta
- Cinematography: Rohan K Paul; Gambi Arabindo; Sayan Mukherjee
- Edited by: Abhishek Mondal
- Music by: Vikky Singh
- Production company: Sahi Bangla Films
- Distributed by: Kolkata Films
- Release date: 2 August 2024
- Running time: 107 minutes
- Country: India
- Language: Bengali

Kaliachak Chapter 1 is a 2024 Indian Bengali-language crime thriller film directed by Ratool Mukherjee. The ensemble cast includes Asim Aktar, Rupanjana Mitra, Partha Sarathi, Deboprasad Haldar and Debapratim Dasgupta. Produced by Sahi Bangla Films, the film was released on 2 August 2024. It is based on the 2021 murder of four members of a family in Kaliachak in the Malda district of West Bengal.

The music is done by Vikky Singh and the Sound design and mixing has been handled by Silajit Chakraborty.

A sequel, Kaliachak Chapter 2, was announced in January 2025.

== Synopsis ==
The film is set in Kaliachak, a village in West Bengal's Malda district. Based on a true event, it explores how poverty, lack of education, domestic abuse and poor upbringing lead young adults into crime.

The narrative centers around a 19-year-old Asik Ahmed, who is involved in the murder of four of his own family members. They were his father, mother, small sister and grandmother. Upon investigation, law enforcement officers discovered their decomposed bodies from an abandoned place. On further investigation, the officials got to know about Asik's computer hacking skills. Despite confessing for the homicides, he shows no remorse for his action. Following this tragic incident, the film highlights the struggles of law enforcement officials dealing with gangs and criminal organizations in this seemingly quiet but troubled village.

== Cast ==
- Asim Aktar as Asik Ahmed
- Rupanjana Mitra as West Bengal Police Officer Sudha Malakar
- Partha Sarathi
- Deboprasad Haldar
- Debapratim Dasgupta as Ashiq's father
- Mrinmoy Das

== Production ==
The film was officially announced in November 2023. In an interview with Arindam Chatterjee from The Telegraph, Director Ratool Mukherjee expressed "Protagonist Asim Aktar is an exceptionally dedicated actor, always eager to learn. He followed my instructions with the diligence of an attentive student and sought advice from senior actors on set to enhance his performance". He also stated that Atanu, Asim and his team had literally scrutinised every news article, every video footage and every news report on the incident to form the core of this film.

== Soundtrack ==
Kaliachak Chapter 1

Soundtrack album by Vikky Singh
- Released: 29 May 2024
- Studio: Soul String Studio
- Genre: Feature film soundtrack
- Length: 10:32
- Language: Bengali
- Label: Zee Music Bangla

Track listing
| No. | Title | Lyrics | Music | Singer(s) | Length |
|---|---|---|---|---|---|
| 1. | "Golemale" | Sayantan Jha; Tapas Sarkar | Vikky Singh | Nayan Raj | 2:49 |
| 2. | "O Khuda" | Sayantan Jha; Tapas Sarkar | Vikky Singh | Supratip Bhattacharya | 3:35 |
| 3. | "Toke Chai" | Sayantan Jha; Tapas Sarkar | Vikky Singh | Raj Barman | 4:48 |
| Total length: | | | | | 10:32 |

== Release ==
The film's trailer was made available on several digital platforms. Initially the film was supposed to release on 14 June, but due to various controversies, including protests by residents of Kaliachak alleging defamation of their village, the film was postponed and finally released on 2 August.

== Reception ==
Debarshi Bandopadhyay from Anandabazar Patrika rated the film 6 out of 10 stars and concluded "Many young filmmakers are interested in making films on new topics with a low budget and emotional reliance. In 2021, four members of a family were murdered in Kaliachak. The film is primarily based on that incident." Although he criticised the plot, he praised the acting of the cast, specially Asim and the touch of reality interwoven with the society.

Piya Roy of The Telegraph described the film as a "fast-paced crime thriller" that ventures into the realm of crime and action, and is based on the criminal underbelly of small town and rural Bengal. She noted that the narrative deals with a complex maze of characters involved in criminal activities, and that poverty, lack of education, domestic abuse and the absence of basic requisites of a good upbringing are seen as reasons for young adults stepping into a life of crime. The review also highlighted the ensemble cast, including Rupanjana Mitra as a no-nonsense police officer, supported by debutant actor Asim and others like Partha Sarathi, Deboprasad Halder, Debapratim Dasgupta, Puja Saha and Mrinmoy Das.

Suparna Majumder of Sangbad Pratidin noted that the film is based on the true incident of the Kaliachak murders and that director Ratool Mukherjee took creative liberties for cinematic purposes. She commended the director for choosing such a complex subject, but felt the script needed more cohesion. The review highlighted the performances of the largely new cast, particularly Rupanjana Mitra as police officer Sudha Malakar and Debapratim Dasgupta as Ashiq's father, whose expressive eyes were praised. Majumder also mentioned that the narrative moves between past and present, includes a twist, and hints at Kaliachak Chapter 2. She concluded that while the effort is commendable, the screenplay could have been tighter and the psychological aspects explored further.
