= Dahan (1997 film) =

- DVD cover
- Directed by: Rituparno Ghosh
- Written by: Suchitra Bhattacharya (story); Rituparno Ghosh (screenplay)
- Starring: Shakuntala Barua; Abhishek Chatterjee; Indrani Halder; Subhendu Chatterjee; Aditi Chatterjee; Rituparna Sengupta; Suchitra Mitra
- Edited by: Arghyakamal Mitra
- Music by: Debojyoti Mishra
- Release date: 1997
- Running time: 145 minutes
- Country: India
- Language: Bengali

Dahan (Crossfire) (1997) is an Indian Bengali social drama film directed by Rituparno Ghosh. It is based on a story of the same name by Suchitra Bhattacharya.

== Plot ==
The story begins when Romita, a sensitive newly married woman, and her husband Palash are caught in a sudden downpour near a metro station. While Palash briefly steps away, a gang of affluent young men aggressively harass and molest Romita. When Palash returns and attempts to stop them, he is brutally beaten. Amidst a crowd of passive onlookers, only one person takes action: Srobona Sarkar, nicknamed Jhinuk, an independent schoolteacher who rushes forward, fights off the attackers, and ensures the couple is rushed to the hospital.

The aftermath of the assault thrusts both women into the public eye with wildly divergent reactions. Jhinuk is hailed as a feminist icon by the media, women's organizations, and her students, though her sudden prominence strains her relationship with her conventional fiancé, Tunir, who grows deeply uncomfortable with her public activism. Romita experiences the exact opposite treatment. Although initially met with sympathy, neighbors, police, and Palash’s colleagues quickly begin casting moral aspersions, whispering that Romita may have provoked the attack or known her assailants.

Stung by insecurity and peer pressure, Palash’s sympathy curdles into toxic resentment and paranoia. He subjects Romita to intense psychological abuse, culminating in a harrowing act of marital rape within their own home. Stripped of any safety inside her domestic sphere, Romita finds herself completely isolated, writing long confessional letters to her sister in Canada as she contemplates fleeing her marriage. Meanwhile, as the criminal case moves toward trial, the families of the wealthy perpetrators use political connections, bribes, and intimidation to suppress the prosecution. Tunir aggressively urges Jhinuk to drop her involvement, linking his career progression to political compliance, but Jhinuk stubbornly refuses to compromise.

Romita faces an even more intense campaign of institutional and domestic silencing. Her in-laws and husband coerce her into submission to protect family honor, demanding that she alter her testimony. When the case reaches the courtroom, broken down by domestic violence and constant pressure, Romita gives a compromised, evasive testimony that fails to identify or incriminate the attackers. Although Jhinuk stands firm and gives an honest account, the prosecution collapses due to Romita's hostile turn and a lack of collaborative evidence, allowing the perpetrators to walk free.

The failure of the trial shatters both women's remaining illusions regarding justice, marriage, and societal protection. Jhinuk experiences a profound disillusionment with her personal relationships and rejects a life built on compromise, choosing to walk away from Tunir to reclaim her independence. Romita decides to break free from her domestic imprisonment by securing a solo trip to visit her sister in Canada. The film concludes with both women navigating transitional, open spaces as they move forward independently, having finally shed the restrictive expectations of family and society.

== Cast ==
- Rituparna Sengupta as Romita Chowdhury
- Indrani Halder as Srabana "Jhinuk" Sarkar
- Aditi Chatterjee as Trina
- Pradip Mukherjee as Jhinuk's father
- Shakuntala Barua as Jhinuk's mother
- Mamata Shankar as Romita's sister-in-law
- Shiboprosad Mukherjee as Jhinuk's brother
- Abhishek Chatterjee as Polash Chowdhury
- Suchitra Mitra as Jhinuk's thammi
- Subhendu Chatterjee as Romita's father
- Sanjeev Dasgupta as Jhinuk's fiancé
- Dibya Bhattacharya as Romita's father-in-law

== Awards ==
45th National Film Awards

- National Film Award for Best Feature Film in Bengali – Rituparno Ghosh
- National Film Award for Best Screenplay – Rituparno Ghosh
- National Film Award for Best Actress – Rituparna Sengupta & Indrani Halder

== Trivia ==
Rachna Banerjee disclosed that Ghosh wanted to cast her as the protagonist of the film. She had to refuse his proposal since she had some prior commitments in South Indian film Industry. She did not ask him which role he was interested to cast her in. Banerjee often regrets the circumstances that made her refuse the film.
