= Off the Grid (film) =

- Theatrical release poster
- Directed by: Johnny Martin
- Written by: Jim Agnew
- Produced by: Luca Matrundola; Richard Salvatore; David Lipper; Bobby Daly Jr. Rick Moore
- Starring: Josh Duhamel; Greg Kinnear
- Cinematography: David Stragmeister
- Music by: Frederik Wiedmann
- Production companies: Latigo Films; Eyevox Entertainment; Lady Bacardi Media; March On Productions; Red Sea Media
- Distributed by: Lionsgate; Grindstone Entertainment Group
- Release date: June 27, 2025
- Running time: 105 minutes
- Countries: United States; Italy
- Language: English

Off the Grid is a 2025 action film directed by Johnny Martin. Loosely based on the 2019 Bengali film Password, it stars Josh Duhamel and Greg Kinnear.

== Plot ==
The engineer and hacker Jack Guy has gone into hiding, living off-the-grid in a cabin by a lake in the woods near a sleepy town. He previously invented a miniaturized energy source, which he wanted to realize as a product for the benefit of humanity through industry.

He was supposed to do this work for the entrepreneur Belcor, together with the engineer Ranish. However, when Jack Guy learned that Belcor, contrary to his promises, wanted to use the invention for weapons technology, he quit and went into hiding.

Belcor, however, wants to force him to continue the development, which is why he has him searched for. Once he has tracked him down, he sends a team led by the assassin Marcus to capture him.

Jack Guy escapes and goes into hiding again, aided by two locals—the teenager Chase and the South American Josey. After the failure of the first team, Belcor sends a second one to support Marcus, with Ranish taking the lead, as he knows Jack's way of thinking. When the clash ensues again, Jack, with the help of Chase and Josey, manages to eliminate everyone except Ranish and simulate his own death.

Belcor then has Ranish imprisoned, saying that this will take until he alone succeeds in bringing the invention to market. Jack Guy and Josey are now able to go into hiding again.

== Cast ==
- Josh Duhamel as Jack Guy
- Greg Kinnear as Ranish
- María Elisa Camargo as Josey
- David Lipper as Eddie
- Michael Zapesotsky as Chase
- Ana Golja as Katrina
- Michael Papajohn as Sheriff
- Peter Stormare as Belcor
- Talia Asseraf as Mia
- Ricky Russert as Marcus
- Monia Lea Rafaeli as Jade

== Production ==
In November 2023, it was announced that Duhamel and Kinnear were cast in the film.

In October 2024, it was announced that Camargo, Stormare and several other actors were also cast in the film, which by then was in post-production.

The film was shot in Clinton, Mississippi.

== Release ==
Off the Grid was released in selected theaters and on video on demand on June 27, 2025.

== Reception ==
The film has a 9% rating on Rotten Tomatoes based on 11 reviews.

Joe Leydon of Variety gave the film a negative review and wrote, “ Director Johnny Martin’s hackneyed action-thriller is woefully short on action and thrills, and generic enough to suggest it was scripted by AI.”

Ben Gibbons of Screen Rant rated the film a 6 out of 10.

=== Accolades ===
Accolades received by Off the Grid
Award	Date of ceremony	Category	Recipient(s)	Result	Ref.
Golden Raspberry Awards	March 14, 2026	Worst Supporting Actor	Greg Kinnear	Nominated	
