= Ninaithale Inikkum (2021 TV series) =

Tamil language television series

- Genre: Drama; Romance; Supernatural; Thriller
- Based on: Mithai
- Written by: Tamizhmaran
- Directed by: V. Priyan; M.R. Ponn Elango; E. Ashokan
- Starring: Swathi Sharma; Anand Selvan
- Country of origin: India
- Original language: Tamil
- No. of episodes: 1417

Production
- Producer: S. Sabreesh Kumar
- Cinematography: Martin Jo
- Camera setup: Multi-camera
- Running time: 22 minutes
- Production company: Monk Studios

Original release
- Network: Zee Tamil
- Release: 23 August 2021 – 25 October 2025

Ninaithale Inikkum is an Indian Tamil language television series which aired on Zee Tamil. It stars Swathi Sharma and Anand Selvan in lead roles. It was directed by N. Priyan under the banner of Monk Studios and produced by Sabreesh Kumar. It premiered from 23 August 2021 and ended on 25 October 2025. The storyline of the serial is taken from Bengali television series Mithai aired on Zee Bangla, however it has a different narration later.

== Cast ==
=== Main ===
- Swathi Sharma as
  - Bommi: A sweet seller, Siddharth's first wife (dead)
  - Rani: fake Bommi and Siddharth's second wife
  - Samyuktha
- Anand Selvan as
  - Siddharth: A civil engineer; Padmanaban's son; Darshini's brother; Bommi and Rani's husband
  - Parthiban
  - Vedan

=== Recurring ===
- Suresh Krishnamurthy as Deivanayagam; Siddharth's paternal grandfather; father of Padmanaban, Chidambaram and Valarmathi
- Hema Srikanth as Anjali Devi; Siddharth's paternal grandmother; mother of Padmanaban, Chidambaram and Valarmathi
- Bala as Padmanaban; Siddharth and Darshini's father
- Neha Jha / Swetha Shrimpton / Anisha Ishwarya as Tamannah; Siddharth's friend, colleague and one-sided lover
- VJ Krish as Mano; Savithiri's son, Tamannah's husband
- Dr. Sharmila as Savithiri
- Rajeshwari as Nethra; Siddarth's rival
- Vinitha Shalini as Jhansi
- Krishnakumar as Raghuvaran; Siddharth's paternal uncle; Lokesh's father
- Gayatri Priya as Krishnaveni; Bommi's mother, Annalakshmi's close friend
- Deepthi / Sree Nidhi / Dhachayani / Sree Nidhi / Shalini as Dharshini; Siddharth's younger sister Nivas's wife
- Akila as Varlarmathi; Siddharth's paternal aunt; Lokesh's mother
- Arvind Kathare as Chidambaram; Siddharth's paternal uncle; Vinay and Ramya's father
- Leela Menon as Sivagami; Siddharth's paternal aunt; Vinay and Ramya's mother
- Vicky Roshan as Vinay; Siddharth's paternal cousin brother
- Aruljothi as Ramya; Siddharth's paternal cousin sister
- Mithun Raj as Jagadeesh; Adopted son of Siddharth's family
- Preethi Kumar as Preethi Jagadeesh; Jagadeesh's wife
- RJ Saba as Lokesh; Siddharth's paternal cousin brother
- Pranav Mohan as Nivas; Ramya's love interest, Dharshini's husband
- Janane Prabhu as Advocate Nalini; Tamannah's mother, a lawyer
- Aarthi Ram as Advocate Vinothini; Nalini's sister
- Deepa Nethran as Annalakshmi; Siddharth and Darshini's mother

=== Special Appearances ===
- Baba Bhaskar (2023)
- Livingston as Amirthalingam
- Rishi as Inspector Sethupathi; Siddharth's friend
- Aishwarya Baskaran as Thaiyalnayagi; Bommi's aunt (2022)
- Vijay Sethupathi as himself (voice-over)
- Kuyili as Eashwari; Siddharth's grandmother, Deivayanayagam's sister
- Kaajal Pasupathi as Shilpa (2024)
- Vaishnavi Arulmozhi as Pirathiyakaradrvi (2024)
- Shreekumar as Kaalabairavar (2024)
- Ashwini Radhakrishna as Makali (2024)
- Parvathy as Marikaranika (2024)
- Lavanya as Unnamalai Nachiyar (2024)
- Swetha as Bommi (2025)

== Production ==
=== Casting ===
Newcomer actress Swathi Sharma were cast to play lead roles of Bommi and Rani. Actor Anand Selvan was cast as male lead Siddharth, marking his return after Colors Tamil's Uyire 2.

In November 2021, actress Neha Jha, who played Tamannah, quit the series was replaced by Swetha Shrimpton. Model and Swimmer Janane Prabhu was cast as a lawyer Nalini, who played Tamannah's mother. However, In November 2023 she quit the series due to the end of her story.

After Deepthi quit the show, Sree Nidhi replaced her as Dharshini. However in May 2022, she also quit the series for personal reasons and was replaced by Dhachayani. However, after once again got back Sreenidhi as Dharshini replacing Dhachayani.

In January 2023, actor Vijay Sethupathi was voice cast as special Appearances. In after one month, dance choreographer Baba Bhaskar was cast as special Appearances. In May 2023, Bigg Boss (Tamil TV series) season 5 fame Thamarai Selvi joined the show as Thamarai.

In June 2024, actresses Vaishnavi Arulmozhi, Ashwini Radhakrishna, Parvathy, Lavanya and Arthika to make a cameo Appearances. In July 2024, actress Farina Azad to make a special appearance as Ichchadhari Nagini.

In 3 May 2025, actress Swetha was cast as special Appearances as Bommi.

== Awards ==
Award	Category	Recipient	Role
Zee Tamil Kudumbam Viruthugal 2022	Social Media Face of The Year-Female	Swathi Sharma	Bommi
Zee Tamil Kudumbam Viruthugal 2022	Best Performing Show on ZEE5		

== Adaptations ==
Language	Title	Original release	Network(s)	Last aired	Notes
Bengali	Mithai মিঠাই	4 January 2021	Zee Bangla	9 June 2023	Original
Tamil	Ninaithale Inikkum நினைத்தாலே இனிக்கும்	23 August 2021	Zee Tamil	25 October 2025	Remake
Odia	Jhili ଝିଲ୍ଲୀ	20 September 2021	Zee Sarthak	30 September 2023	Remake
Hindi	Mithai मिठाई	4 April 2022	Zee TV	24 September 2022	Remake
Punjabi	Gall Mithi Mithi ਗਲ ਮੀਠੀ ਮੀਠੀ	20 November 2023	Zee Punjabi	30 November 2024	Remake
Kannada	Rajakumari ರಾಜಕುಮಾರಿ	25 August 2025	Zee Power	4 February 2026	Remake
