= Pilu (TV series) =

2022 Indian television series

- Genre: Drama; Comedy
- Created by: Samrat Ghosh
- Screenplay by: Saswati Ghosh
- Story by: Saswati Ghosh
- Directed by: Anup Chakroborty; Rajendra Prasad Das
- Creative director: Saswati Ghosh
- Starring: Megha Daw; Gourab Roy Chowdhury
- Opening theme: "Hasi Gaane Shobar Prane Pilu"
- Composer: Upali Chattopadhyay
- Country of origin: India
- Original language: Bengali
- No. of episodes: 305

Production
- Executive producers: Krishanu Ganguly; Shubhangi Ghosh (Zee Bangla)
- Producer: Zee Bangla
- Cinematography: Shantanu Dutta
- Editors: Jishu Nath; Biplab Mondal
- Camera setup: Multi-camera
- Running time: 22 minutes
- Production company: Zee Bangla

Original release
- Network: Zee Bangla
- Release: 10 January – 13 November 2022

Pilu is a 2022 Indian Bengali drama television series that released on 10 January 2022 on Zee Bangla. It is also available on the digital platform ZEE5. The series is produced under the banner of Zee Bangla Productions. It stars Megha Daw and Gourab Roy Chowdhury in lead roles.

== Plot ==
Pilu is a folk singer and comes from a village. Her singing impresses Aditya, who is actually Pilu's father, whom she has never met, owner of "Suramandal" music institute where classical music is practised. Aditya appoints his favorite student, Aahir, as her music teacher to improve her singing system. Despite their initial differences in music, love blossoms between them. A few days later, they are shocked to learn that Aditya is Pilu's father.

== Cast ==
=== Main ===
- Megha Daw as Piyali Basu Mallick (née Mukhopadhyay) aka Pilu – a folk singer, Ahir's student turned wife, Sanatan's granddaughter, Aditya and Kalyani's daughter, Rijula's step daughter, Ranja's paternal half-sister
- Gourab Roy Chowdhury as Aahir Basu Mallick aka Ustaadji – a classical singer, Aditya's student, Pilu's teacher and husband, Sabyasachi and Sohini's son, Ranja's ex-love interest; Mallar's elder cousin brother and rival
- Idhika Paul as Ranjini Basu Mallick (née Mukhopadhyay) aka Ranja – Aditya and Rijula's daughter; Pilu's paternal half-sister; Rangan and Raima's cousin sister; Aahir's ex-fiance; Mallar's wife
- Dhrubajyoti Sarkar as Mallar Basu Mallick aka Ghontu / Mallar Roy Chowdhury (fake) – Sukumar and Rukmini's son; Ahir's cousin brother; Suramandal's former rival; Mallika's elder brother; Ranja's husband

=== Recurring ===
- Kaushik Chakraborty as Aditya Narayan Mukhopadhyay – Owner of "Suramandal" music institute; Pandit Gyanendraprasad's student; Kalyani former husband and Rijula's present husband; Pilu and Ranja's father; Ahir's teacher
- Anjana Basu as Rijula Mukhopadhyay (née Chattopadhyay) aka Manima – Aditya's second wife; Pandit Gyanendraprasad's eldest daughter; Pilu's stepmother; Ranja's mother
- Moyna Banerjee as Kalyani Mitra – Pilu's mother; Aditya's first wife; Ranja's stepmother
- Ashok Mukherjee as Sanatan Mitra - Kalyani's father; Pilu's grandfather
- Biswanath Basu as Uday Narayan Mukhopadhyay – A Tabalia; Pilu and Ranja's paternal uncle; Aditya's younger brother; Ritoja's husband; Rangan and Raima's father
- Swarnakamal Dutta as Ritoja Mukhopadhyay (née Chattopadhyay) aka Ritu – Gnanendraprasad's youngest daughter; Rijula's younger sister; Uday's wife; Rangan and Raima's mother
- Mimi Dutta as Mallika Mukhopadhyay (née Basu Mallick) – Aahir's paternal cousin sister; Rangan's wife; Mallar's younger sister; Sukumar and Rukmini's daughter
- Rudrajit Mukherjee as Rangan Mukhopadhyay – Uday and Ritoja's son; Ranja and Pilu's cousin brother; Raima's elder brother; Shinjinee's ex-love interest; Mallika's husband
- Soumi Chakraborty as Raima Mukhopadhyay aka Rai – Uday and Ritoja's daughter; Ranja and Pilu's cousin sister; Rangan's younger sister
- Sujoy Saha as Sayan - Rangan's friend.
- Aditi Chatterjee as Sohini Basu Mullick – Aahir's mother; Sabyasachi's wife; music teacher at "Suramandal"; Mallar and Mallika's paternal aunt
- Arindam Banerjee as Sabyasachi Basu Mullick – Aahir's father; Sohini's husband; Mallar and Mallika's paternal uncle; Aditya's rival
- Runa Bandyopadhyay as Annapurna Mukhopadhyay aka "Thummum" – Pilu, Ranja, Raima and Rangan's paternal grandmother; Aditya and Uday's mother
- Promita Chakraborty as Shinjinee – Aditya's friend's daughter; Rangan's former love interest
- Samir Biswas as Purnendu Bose aka "Mamadadu" – A lawyer; Rijula and Ritoja's maternal uncle
- Arijit Guha as Digbijay Basu Mallick aka Panditji – Head of Basu Mallick family; Head of "Suroniketan"; Sabyasachi and Sukumar's father; Aahir, Mallar and Mallika's grandfather
- Shyamashish Pahari as Sukumar Basu Mallick – Sabyasachi's younger brother; Aahir's paternal uncle; Rukmini's husband; Mallar and Mallika's father
- Sanjuktaa Roy Chowdhury as Rukmini Basu Mallick – Aahir's paternal aunt; Sukumar's wife; Mallar and Mallika's mother
- Chaitali Chakroborty as Bijaya Devi (née Basu Mallick) – Digbijay's younger sister; Sabyasachi and Sukumar's paternal aunt; Aahir, Mallar and Mallika's paternal grandaunt
- Biplab Dasgupta as Himangshu Singha Roy aka Gurudev – Basu Mallick family's priest
- Sourav Chatterjee as Gokul – Special Priest for Rath Yatra Puja at "Suromondol"
- Fahim Mirza as Kushal Dutta – Ranja's friend
- Manasi Sengupta as Bindhi - Mallar's fake wife & obsessive lover
- Rupam Singha as Mahadev Roy - Bindhi's husband

=== Guest appearances ===
- Saikat Mitra as a judge of Spring special West Bengal Music Research Academy show
- Haimanti Shukla as a judge of Spring special West Bengal Music Research Academy show

== Reception ==
Week	Year	BARC Viewership		Ref.
Week	Year	TRP	Rank	Ref.
Week 2	2022	7.8	8	
Week 3	2022	7.8	8	
Week 4	2022	7.7	7	
Week 5	2022	7.4	8	
Week 6	2022	7.3	8	
Week 7	2022	7.2	10	
Week 8	2022	7.1	10	
Week 9	2022	6.9	10	
Week 10	2022	7.4	10	
Week 11	2022	7.4	10	
Week 12	2022	7.6	9	
Week 13	2022	7.3	6	
Week 14	2022	7.2	7	
Week 15	2022	6.1	6	
Week 16	2022	6.2	7	
Week 17	2022	5.6	9	
Week 18	2022	5.7	10	
Week 19	2022	6.1	7	

== Production ==
=== Promo shoot ===
The first promo of this series was shot at Saharajore Irrigation Scheme at Purulia.
