= Goyenda Ginni =

Indian Bengali anthology television series

- Genre: Crime
- Created by: Shree Venkatesh Films
- Written by: Dialogues: Suparna Ghoshal
- Screenplay by: Sarbari Ghoshal
- Story by: Sahana
- Directed by: Anupam Hari; Rajat Paul; Akash Sen
- Starring: Indrani Haldar; Saheb Chatterjee; Aditi Chatterjee; Indrajeet Bose
- Voices of: Madhuraa Bhattacharya
- Opening theme: "Se Je Goyenda Ginni"
- Composer: Upali Chattopadhyay
- Country of origin: India
- Original language: Bengali
- No. of seasons: 1
- No. of episodes: 431

Production
- Producers: Shrikant Mohta; Mahendra Soni
- Running time: 22 minutes
- Production company: Shree Venkatesh Films

Original release
- Network: Zee Bangla
- Release: 7 September 2015 – 25 December 2016

Goyenda Ginni (transl. Detective housewife) is an Indian Bengali crime drama anthology television series that aired from 7 September 2015 to 25 December 2016 on Zee Bangla. Produced by Shree Venkatesh Films, it starred Indrani Haldar, Saheb Chatterjee, Aditi Chatterjee and Indrajeet Bose. It replaced the show Raage Anuraage.

Goyenda Ginni got back in March 2020 due to COVID-19 situation. This show was telecasted on Zee Bangla on 13 May 2024 for the 2nd time on populer demand (Mon–Sun from 12.00PM to 1.00PM). It fetched a high TRP of 8.0.

== Plot summary ==
The main protagonist, Paroma Mitra leads a dual life of a housewife and a detective. The show features short stories of detective cases which Paroma solves.

Parama Mitra first discovers her talent after her family’s treasured "mukut" (tiara) was lost. After safely returning the tiara to her grandmother and confronting the thief, Arup Roy, a successful police officer who is the brother of her sister-in-law, realizes Parama’s talent and asks her to solve a real life case. Parama accepts while also feeling guilty, as her mother-in-law was not a fan of this as what she calls "men's jobs".

== Cast ==
=== Main ===
- Indrani Haldar as Parama Mitra / Rumi / Pori / Goyenda Ginni, Bhaskar Sen & Urmila's daughter, Parimal's wife.
- Saheb Chatterjee as Dr. Parimal Mitra/Bablu/Dactar Babu, Parama's husband.
- Indrajeet Bose as Inspector Arup Roy (Special Branch)/Rupu, Nandini's younger brother, a brother-like figure to Parama, Mimi's husband.

=== Recurring ===
- Basanti Chatterjee as Kamala Mitra (Thamma)
- Aditi Chatterjee as Nandini Mitra (Nanda), Arup's elder sister, Ashish's wife.
- Ambarish Bhattacharya as Ashish Mitra (Hablu), Nandini's husband.
- Ratna Ghoshal as Ditipriya Mitra a.k.a. Priya (Parimal, Ashish, Deval, Neepa, Disha and Mimi's mother)
- Dr. Basudeb Mukherjee / Tapan Ganguly as Samiran Mitra a.k.a. Samir (Parimal, Ashish, Deval, Neepa, Disha and Mimi's father)
- Saheli Ghosh Roy as Samadrita Mitra a.k.a. Dulki (Daughter of Parama & Parimal)
- Samridha Pal as Botam (Son of Ashish & Nandini)
- Sampurna Mandal as Sreejita Mitra a.k.a. Bhelki (Daughter of Ashish & Nandini)
- Adrija Mukherjee as Tinni (Daughter of Neepa & Arnab)
- Sudipto Basu as Nandini and Arup's father, Ratna's husband
- Chaitali Dasgupta as Ratna Roy (Nandini and Arup's Mother)
- Manasi Sinha as Urmila Sen, Parama's Mother, Bhaskar Sen's wife
- Sourav Chatterjee as
  - Deval Mitra a.k.a. Tablu, Mahua's husband
  - Sandip Sarkar / Fake Deval
- Mimi Dutta as Mahua Mitra(Gullu), Deval's wife.
- Sananda Basak as Neepa, Arnab's wife
- Rajiv Bose as Arnab, Neepa's husband
- Sanchari Mondal as Disha, Neelabho's wife.
- Anindya Chatterjee as Neelabho, Disha's husband.
- Priya Malakar as Mimi, Arup's wife.
- Priya Mondal as Rupsi/Roops, Mahua's cousin sister, Arup's temporary love interest.
- Joyjit Banerjee as Diganta Sanyal a.k.a. Dicks, Rupsi's namesake boyfriend.
- Subrato Guha Roy as Police Superintendent N.C. Chowdhury, Arup's boss.
- Ashim Roy Chowdhury as Manas Dutta, Second officer

=== Episodic cast ===
Since the show ran in a format where Paroma solves detective cases, each case formed a story that was presented over a number of episodes. The important characters in each short story finds mention in the below list.

- Phalguni Chatterjee as Haradhan Guha
- Maitreyee Mitra as Alokrekha Bagchi a.k.a. Rekha Majumdar, Pranab Majumdar's wife, Joyeeta's mother
- Kaushik Chakraborty as Pranab Majumdar, promoter, Rekha's husband
- Anindya Chakrabarti as Arnab Majumdar, Joyeeta's uncle, Pranab's younger brother /Rabi Sanyal, Madhuri's Husband (Dual character in different episodes)
- Avijit Deb Roy as Nayanabho Dutta a.k.a. Nayan, Alokrekha's ex-boyfriend, Joyeeta's biological father
- Sukriti Lahori as Sukumari Laha, Rathindranath's second wife, Timir & Mihir's mother
- Elfina Mukherjee as Puspita Laha, Rathindranath Laha's daughter-in-law
- Sourav Das as Subho, Puspita's younger brother
- Kushal Chakraborty as Mridul, Kanchana's husband, Rathin Laha's son-in-law
- Piyali Mitra as Kanchana, Rathindranath's daughter, Mridul's wife, Bublai & Bulbuli's mother
- Sumanta Mukherjee as Satya Sanyal, Subhen & Hemanta's father, Monorama's husband
- Ananya Chatterjee as Monorama Sanyal, Satya's wife, Subhen & Hemanta's mother
- Gita Mukherjee as Gitashree a.k.a. Geetu/Chini thammi, Satya's sister, Hemanta's Paternal Aunt
- Arindam Banerjee as Subhen Sanyal, Gopa's husband, Satya & Monorama's elder son
- Reshmi Sen as Gopa Sanyal, Subhen's wife, Satya & Monorama's elder daughter-in-law
- Biresh Chakraborty as Hemanta Sanyal, Subhra's husband, Satya & Monorama's younger son
- Senjuti Roy Mukherjee as Subhra Sanyal, Hemanta's wife, Satya & Monorama's younger daughter-in-law
- Aarja Banerjee as Trishita Sen, renowned singer
- Ritoja Majumder as Apala Mukherjee, renowned singer
- Debdut Ghosh as Debasish Sen, Trishita's elder brother
- Priyanka Halder as Trishita's Sister-in-law
- Shraboni Bonik as
  - Bidula Moitra, renowned singer
  - Sukanya Sen, Editor of Kalpana Publications (Dual character in different episodes)
- Sohini Sanyal as Sangeeta Chowdhury, renowned singer
- Sandip Chakraborty as Sandip
- Avrajit Chakraborty as Ruchir Sengupta
- Nitya Ganguly as Jahar Sen
- Soumya Mukherjee as Koushik Das
- Soumendra Bhattacharya as Shyamsundar Biswas, Ruchir's roommate
- Rumi Dutta as Alokananda Bagchi, Sudip Bagchi's wife, Titli's mother
- Piyali Basu as Arpita Majumder, poetess
- Milan Roy Choudhury as Shekhar Dutta, Litterateur
- Mishka Halim as Sudha Dutta, Shekhar Dutta's wife
- Sneha Chatterjee as Rai Sen, Rabin Sen's wife and Niloy's love interest
- Judhajit Banerjee as Rabin Sen, Rai's husband
- Sourav Chakraborty as Niloy Som
- Sanjuktaa Roy Chowdhury as Malobika Chatterjee
- Anindyo Sarkar as Soumik Mitra, Director of group theatre, Malabika's love interest
- Fahim Mirza as Dibakar Chatterjee a.k.a. Diba, Madhumita's Husband, Durgapada & Kalyani's younger son, Putus's father
- Sudip Sengupta as Sudhakar Chatterjee a.k.a. Sudha, Dibakar's elder brother, Durgapada & Kalyani's elder son
- Subhasis Banerjee as Taraprasanna Chatterjee, Dibakar's grandfather
- Chaitali Duttabarman as Mahamaya Chatterjee, Dibakar's grandmother, Taraprasanna's wife
- Abantimohan Banerjee as Durgapada Chatterjee (Taraprasanna & Mahamaya's biological son, Sudhakar & Dibakar's father)
- Nibedita Chakrabarty as Kalyani Chatterjee (Taraprasanna & Mahamaya's daughter-in-law, Sudhakar & Dibakar's mother)
- Debranjan Nag as Madhab Chakraborty (Taraprasanna & Nibhanani's biological son) a.k.a. Naran Chatterjee (Malidadu)
- Avik Bhattacharya as (fake Madhab Chakraborty)
- Chitra Sen as Pritikana Majumder
- Kalyani Mondal as Smritikana Chowdhury (Pritikana's younger sister)
- Manishankar Banerjee as Pushpendu Majumder (Pritikana's elder son)
- Niladri Lahiri as Swarnendu Majumder (Pritikana's second son)
- Kaushik Bhattachariya as Dibyendu Majumder a.k.a. Dibyo (Pritikana's younger son)
- Diganta Saha as Dip, Puspendu's Son
- Upanita Banerjee as Sunanda Dasgupta, Manab & Seema's daughter
- Saugata Bandyopadhyay as Subhendu Dasgupta (Sunanda's younger brother, Manab & Seema's son)
- Nayana Bandyopadhyay as Lipi (Subhendu's Wife)
- Srabanti Mukherjee as Pratima Bhowmik, Lipi's mother, Dhiman's wife
- Mou Bhattacharyya as Lipi's aunt, Dhiman's sister
- Ankita Majumdar as Koli (Nabendu's wife, Babli's mother, Sunanda & Shubhendu's sister-in-law)
- Dolly Basu as Darshana Roy
- Riya Ganguly as Gunja Basu Roy, Darshana's daughter
- Suchandrima as Atreyee Roy, Dhruba's wife, Darshana's elder daughter-in-law
- Juhi Sengupta as Ritu Roy, Subha's wife, Darshana's younger daughter-in-law
- Sudeshna Roy as Rita Chandra, Darshana's office colleague
- Rumki Chatterjee as Labanya Sikder
- Rumpa Das as Sudeshna
- Kuyasha Biswas as Reporter
- Jayanta Banerjee as Prabodh Sarkhel
- Debolina Nandy as Oli, Koushik's wife
- Anuradha Roy as Ballori Gupta
- Ashok Mukhopadhyay as Anish Gupta
- Suman Banerjee as Bitan Gupta
- Avery Singha Roy as Ahana, Ballori's elder daughter
- Riyanka Dasgupta as Barna Gupta, Ballari Gupta's Youngest Daughter
- Pinky Banerjee as Rikhia's Mother
- Rita Dutta Chakraborty as Bijoya Sen
- Sayak Chakraborty as Swarthak
- Basabdatta Chatterjee as Tridha Banerjee, Neelima & Rathin Banerjee's daughter, Tirtha's Sister
- Moumita Gupta as Neelima Banerjee
- Rajkumar Dutta as Tirtha Banerjee, Neelima & Rathin Banerjee's son
- Debaparna Chakraborty as Adrija Dutta/Ritoja Dutta
- Pritha Bandopadhyay as Mrs Dutta(Adrija and Ritoja's mother)
- Lily Chakravarty as Sudeshna Basak
- Honey Bafna as Samrat
- Ananya Biswas as Mondira
- Deerghoi Paul as Monideepa
- Mafin Chakrabarty as Devika
- Palash Ganguly as Indra
- Rajesh Kr Chattopadhyay as Pratik
- Dwaipayan Das as Neeladri Chatterjee
- Aparajita Ghosh as Odishi dancer Poulami Bhowmick (Pratik's wife)
- Kanyakumari Mukherjee as Ishani Chatterjee
- Satyapriyo Sarkar as Rajatendu Lahiri
- Sancharee Mukherjee as Indira Lahiri, Rajatendu's Wife
- Arindol Bagchi as Swarnendu Lahiri
- Aritra Dutta as Bitonu Lahiri a.k.a. Binu
- Payel Chakrabarty as Radhika Lahiri, Bitonu's Wife
- Bikash Bhowmick as Prabesh Ranjan Sanyal
- Mrinal Mukherjee as Sudhakar Sen
- Sanjib Sarkar as Prabhakar Sen
- Debomoy Mukherjee as Upal Sen (Sudhakar's grandson)
- Dipanjan Bhattacharya as Sombudhyo Sen (Sudhakar's younger son)
- Mahua Bhattacharya as Ruma Sanyal (Rabi, Kobi & Bobby's mother)
- Sagnik Chatterjee as Kobi Sanyal/Yuvraj Sanyal (Abhi) twins brother
- Prantik Banerjee as Bobby Sanyal
- Ria Roy as Ritika Sanyal, Sister of Rabi, Kobi & Bobby
- Mallika Banerjee as Reena Sanyal
- Anindita Raychaudhury as Madhuri Sanyal, Rabi's wife
- Sudip Sarkar as Subhro, Madhuri's elder brother
- Bibriti Chatterjee as Deepa, Bobby's wife
- Sohan Bandopadhyay as Gurudev
- Barun Chakraborty as Inspector A. Halder
- Pradip Dhar as Sujoy Chatterjee/Sujoy Prasad Ghosh
- Abhishek Bose as Raj Ghosh
- Alivia Sarkar as Pola
- Rupsa Chatterjee as Kuhu Mitra
- Shreyasee Samanta as Shalmoli
- Ishani Sengupta as Soudamini alias Saddy
- Namita Chakrabarty as Raj's Mother
- Indrakshi Nag as Mousumi, Raj's Sister-in-law
- Sakshi Dona Saha as Rikhia Gupta
- Ratna Sarkar as Rupa
- Debraj Mukherjee as Inspector Sunil Dey
- Anirban Bhattacharya as Minister Abhay Biswas
- Sonali Chowdhury as Supriya Sanyal
- Sudip Sarkar as Shubro Dastidar(Madhuri's elder brother)
- Swagata Mukherjee as Stranger at last episode
