= Kaalratri (TV series) =

Indian Bengali web series

- Release poster
- Genre: Crime thriller
- Based on: "Ebong Kalratri" by Manoj Sen
- Written by: Ayan Chakraborti
- Screenplay by: Ayan Chakraborti
- Directed by: Ayan Chakraborti
- Starring: Soumitrisha Kundu; Rupanjana Mitra; Indrasish Roy; Rajdeep Gupta
- Theme music composer: Subhadeep Guha
- Composer: Subhadeep Guha
- Country of origin: India
- Original language: Bengali
- No. of seasons: 2
- No. of episodes: 13

Production
- Cinematography: Ramyadip Saha
- Editor: Sanglap Bhowmik
- Camera setup: Single-camera
- Running time: 20-30 minutes
- Production company: Shree Venkatesh Films

Original release
- Release: 2024 – present

Kaalratri (transl. The Night of Death) is an Indian Bengali crime thriller web series. Directed and written by Ayan Chakraborti, and produced by Shree Venkatesh Films, the series is a part of Hoichoi's new "Hoichoi TV+" format of storytelling. The story revolves around a new bride Debi, whose husband is murdered the day after their wedding, plunging her into a maze of secrets and scandal within her new family.

Subhadeep Guha has composed the music of the series. The editing was done by Sanglap Bhowmik whereas Ramyadip Saha handled the cinematography. The series stars Soumitrisha Kundu in the lead role, marking her OTT debut. Indrasish Roy, Rupanjana Mitra and Rajdeep Gupta play other pivotal supporting roles. Two seasons of the series are streaming on the Bengali OTT platform Hoichoi.

== Synopsis ==
The series begins with the wedding of Debi to Rudra Roy Barman, a young man from a wealthy family. However, on her wedding day, Debi's mysterious friend Maya delivers a chilling prophecy: Rudra will die the very next day. True to Maya's prediction, Rudra is found murdered in the family mansion on the first night after their marriage, turning Debi's happiest day into a nightmare.

The tragedy sets in motion a chain of events that exposes the dark side of the Roy Barman family. DSP Satyaki Sanyal takes charge of the murder investigation. As he delves deeper, a web of secrets, betrayals and scandals within the family begins to unravel, making every family member a suspect. Debi finds herself caught in a whirlwind of grief and suspicion, navigating a maze of deceit and danger as she tries to uncover the truth behind her husband's death.

== Cast ==
- Soumitrisha Kundu as Debi
- Indrasish Roy as Rudra, Debi's husband and eldest son of the Roy Barman family
- Anujoy Chattopadhyay as DSP Satyaki Sanyal
- Koushani Mukherjee Zanjeen as Debi's friend Maya
- Debesh Chattopadhyay as Debi's father-in-law Samaresh Roy Barman
- Rupanjana Mitra as Debi's mother-in-law Indrani Roy Barman
- Dipanwita Sarkar as Tani, the maid of the Roy Barman family
- Rajdeep Gupta as Ajitesh, middle son of the Roy Barman family
- Sairity Banerjee as Rai, Ajitesh's wife
- Sounak Roy as Barun, youngest son of the Roy Barman family
- Sampurna Mondal as Kirti, Barun's wife
- Diya Chakraborty as Shibani, the youngest daughter of the Roy Barman family and wife of Bijoy/Akhilesh

== Production ==
=== Development ===
On 15 October 2024, Hoichoi announced "Kaalratri" along with nine other series, as a part of their slate of upcoming projects. In an interview, Kundu revealed that she was in search of a role, besides her regular television soap operas, which would have a intriguing content as well as it would be liked by her core audience. She felt "Kaalratri" was the kind of project that she wanted and hence, accepted it soon after being narrated for the first time.

=== Filming ===
The filming started on 11 September 2024. Diya Chakraborty joined the cast on 24 September 2024. The filming was wrapped up on 4 October 2024.

=== Marketing ===
==== Season 1 ====
The first look picture of Soumitrishna Kundu in a red saree adorned bride was released on 13 September 2024. The first look pictures of the other major characters played by Indrasish Ray, Rajdeep Gupta, Rupanjana Mitra, Sairity Banerjee and Anujoy Chattopadhyay were also released subsequently.

The first look character video of Soumitrishna Kundu, introducing her character as Debi was released on 18 November 2024. The trailer was released on 23 November 2024.

==== Season 2 ====
The second season was announced on 28 February 2025 at the "Golper Parbon 1432". On 19 December 2025, the first poster was released which also revealed its streaming date. The trailer for the second season was released on 2 January 2026.

== Release ==
The series was initially scheduled to release in November 2024. Owing to some post production works, it was delayed and streamed on 6 December 2024.

The second season was streamed on Hoichoi on 9 January 2026.

== Episodes ==
Series	Episodes	Originally released
1	6	6 December 2024
2	7	9 January 2026

=== Season 1 ===
No.	Title	Directed by	Written by	Original release date
1	"Bodhuboron"	Ayan Chakraborti	Ayan Chakraborti	December 6, 2024
2	"Khopar Kaanta"	Ayan Chakraborti	Ayan Chakraborti	December 6, 2024
3	"Debir Bishorjon"	Ayan Chakraborti	Ayan Chakraborti	December 6, 2024
4	"Satyasandhani"	Ayan Chakraborti	Ayan Chakraborti	December 6, 2024
5	"Bhule Jaowa Otit"	Ayan Chakraborti	Ayan Chakraborti	December 6, 2024
6	"Sabyasachi"	Ayan Chakraborti	Ayan Chakraborti	December 6, 2024

=== Season 2 ===
No.	Title	Directed by	Written by	Original release date
1	"Pashar Daan"	Ayan Chakraborti	Ayan Chakraborti	9 January 2026
2	"Trishuler Ulki"	Ayan Chakraborti	Ayan Chakraborti	9 January 2026
3	"Paanmoshlar Gondho"	Ayan Chakraborti	Ayan Chakraborti	9 January 2026
4	"Rawkter Daag"	Ayan Chakraborti	Ayan Chakraborti	9 January 2026
5	"Debi'r Swikarokti"	Ayan Chakraborti	Ayan Chakraborti	9 January 2026
6	"Abhisaap!"	Ayan Chakraborti	Ayan Chakraborti	9 January 2026
7	"Ulot-Puran"	Ayan Chakraborti	Ayan Chakraborti	9 January 2026

== Reception ==
=== Critical reception ===
==== Season 1 ====
Shamayita Chakraborty of OTTplay rated the series 2.5/5 stars and wrote "The problem with the show is that it is formulaic. It follows the ‘tested’ pattern that many other Hoichoi shows have followed and does not really offer anything new. It is gripping, yet it takes us nowhere. It has a flow but no resolution. It ensures a second season but without any excitement attached to it."

Archi Sengupta of Leisure Byte rated the series 1.5/5 stars and wrote "Kaalratri tries too hard to get the point across and spells out every little thing in its story, resulting in the series being quite charmless and, frankly, vulgar. The mystery also loses its way because of the fluff that the series adds constantly to entertain its audience, resulting in a below-average watch for most viewers."

==== Season 2 ====
Archi Sengupta of Leisure Byte rated the series 1.5/5 stars and wrote "Dramatic, over-the-top and completely senseless, this season leans into Debi’s confusion regarding her past and leaves us in a confused loop until she remembers everything. Till then, we are left to watch the same dialogues being told over and over again as everyone sleeps with one another." She criticized Debi's wide eye expression in every other scene, unnecessary degrading dialogues which "exist for no reason", a large number of characters that doesn't contribute anything to the story, the scattered plotline, poor pacing, over-the-top acting, mentioning obvious things and the constant repeating of each other's dialogues.

Parama Dasgupta of Aajkal reviewed the series and noted "To be honest, there are already many stories about elite ancestral households. Can't we think of a different kind of thriller plot this time?" She praised Soumitrisha's acting as Debi, Rupanjana's personality, Anujoy, Swarity and Koushani in their respective roles, the director and the screenplay but bemoaned the same formulaic dark characterisation of the actors in elite households.
