= Mithai (Bengali TV series) =

Indian Bengali television series

- Genre: Family drama; Romance; Comedy
- Created by: Samrat Ghosh
- Screenplay by: Saswati Ghosh
- Story by: Saswati Ghosh
- Directed by: Rajendra Prasad Das; Rupak Dey
- Creative director: Saswati Ghosh
- Starring: Soumitrisha Kundu; Adrit Roy
- Opening theme: "Sukhe Dukhe Misti Mukhe Mithai" by Prashmita Paul
- Composer: Suvam Moitra
- Country of origin: India
- Original language: Bengali
- No. of episodes: 875

Production
- Executive producers: Krishanu Ganguly; Priyanka Seth; Aniruddha Ghosh (Zee Bangla)
- Producer: Zee Bangla
- Production location: Kolkata Bharat Lakshmi Studio
- Cinematography: Shantu Datta
- Editors: Jishu Nath; Biplab Mondal
- Camera setup: Multi-camera
- Running time: 22 minutes
- Production company: Zee Bangla Production

Original release
- Network: Zee Bangla
- Release: 4 January 2021 – 9 June 2023

Mithai (transl. Sweets) is a 2021 Indian Bengali romantic comedy television drama series that aired on Zee Bangla from 4 January 2021 to 9 June 2023. The show is produced by Zee Bangla and it stars Soumitrisha Kundu and Adrit Roy in lead roles. During its broadcast period, it was the TRP topper of Bengali television for 56 weeks, making it one of the most loved shows of Bengali television.

== Plot ==
Mithai is a cheerful, uneducated village sweetseller meanwhile Siddharth is a grumpy gentleman who hates sweet. Later on both of them get married and the series is based on their sweet love life. Along with that the life of Ratul, Nipa, Sree, Rajib, Nanda, Rudra, Som, Torsha is also portrayed and the story also revolves around their family business "Siddheshwar Modak" named after Siddharth's grandfather. The series also has a brief track, where Siddhartha is presumed dead, when his arch-rival, Omi Agarwal tries to kill him. Sid secretly assumes the identity of a Rockstar Ricky Roy, called Ricky the Rockstar, and continues with the investigation to catch the real culprits and manages to nab them. Later, Mithai gave birth to a baby boy names Shakya. Some years later, Mithai went to factory where got into a fire accident and mithai was presumed to be death.She was pregnant but no one was aware of that. 5 years later, Sid became grumble again. He was unable to manage Shakya. Mithi, a lookalike of Mithai, was set for Shakya's responsibility. Soon, Mithi and Sid get married. Few days later, Mithai returned. It was revealed she escaped from the accident and lost her memory and gave birth to a baby girl named Mishti. Then Modak family's every member joined to get mithai's memory back and they all reunite. Mithi and Sid get divorced and mithi married to a Doctor. They all start living happily.

== Cast ==
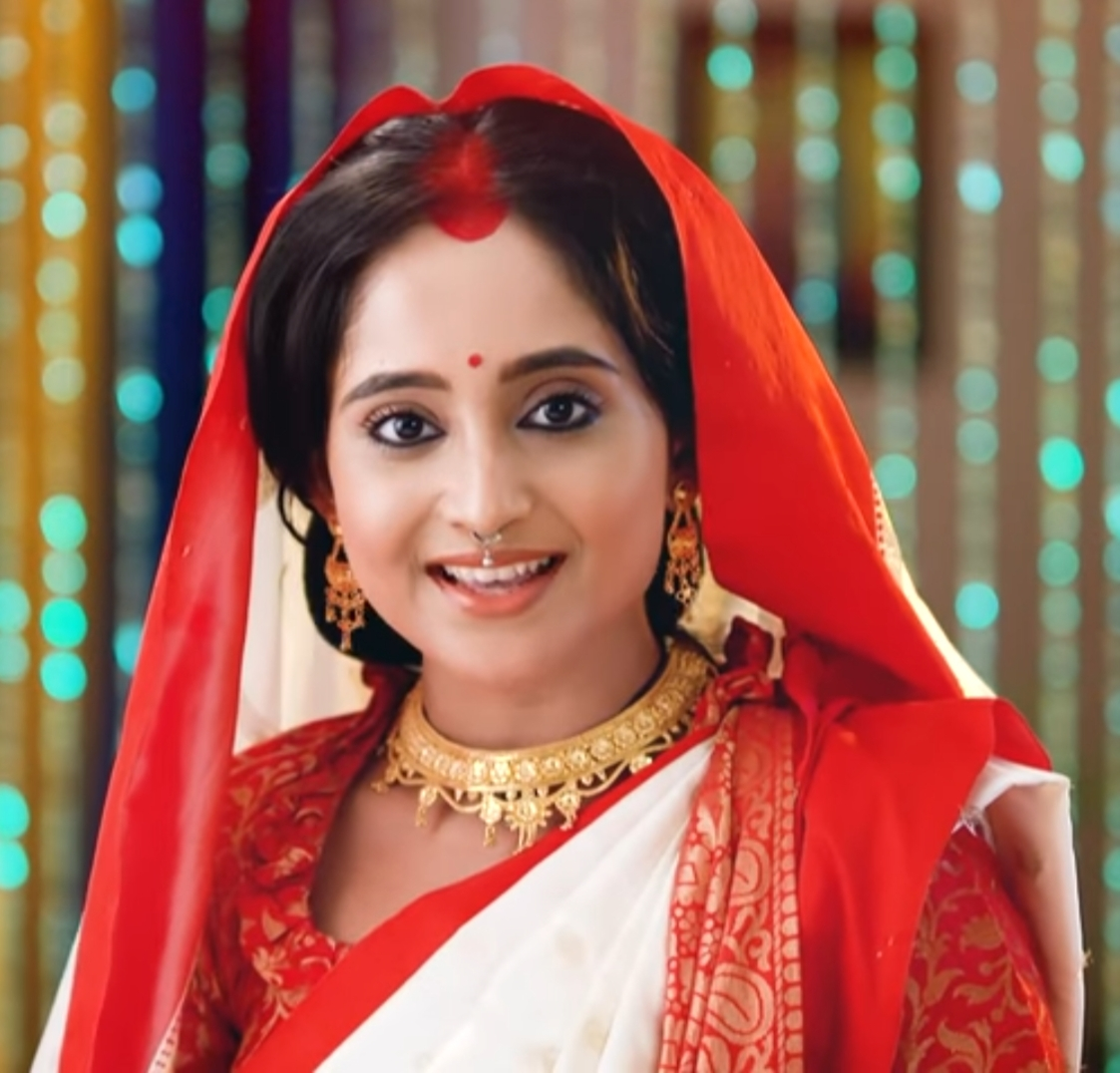
Soumitrisha Kundu portrayed the dual roles of the titular character Mithai Das Modak and her lookalike Mithi Biswas Banerjee in the show.

=== Main ===
- Soumitrisha Kundoo as
  - Mithai Das Modak – A former sweet seller turned businesswoman of Siddheshwar Modak Group; Sudip and Parbati's daughter; Gulti's cousin; Samu and Arati's daughter-in-law; Anuradha's step-daughter-in-law; Sree's sister-in-law; Som's adopted sister-in-law Nanda, Sandy and Nipa's cousin-in-law; Siddhartha's wife; Shakya and Mishti's mother.
  - Mithi Biswas Banerjee – Mithai's lookalike; Mahendra's daughter; Siddhartha's fake wife; Samu and Arati's fake daughter-in-law; Anuradha's fake step-daughter-in-law; Sree's fake sister-in-law; Som's adopted fake sister-in-law; Dr. Rohit's wife; Shakya's foster mother. Mishti's mother figure.
- Adrit Roy as
  - Siddhartha Modak - Former senior architect in PCG and Former head of Siddheshwar Modak Group turned Intelligence officer; Sudip and Parbati's son-in-law; Gulti's cousin-in-law; Samu and Arati's son; Anuradha's step-son; Sree's brother; Som's adopted brother; Nanda, Sandy and Nipa's cousin; Mithai's husband; Mithi's fake husband; Shakya and Mishti's father.
  - Ricky Roy "Ricky the Rockstar" - A famous Rockstar, a fake identity adopted by Siddhartha when he was presumed dead, to perform investigation during the fiasco in Siddheshwar Modak Group; Priyanjali's fake boyfriend, Priyanjali's love interest
    - Ankit Majumdar as Child Siddhartha Modak
- Dhritishman Chakraborty as Shakya Modak – Mithai and Siddhartha's son; Mishti's brother; Mithi's foster son.
- Anumegha Kahali as Mishti Modak – Mithai and Siddhartha's daughter; Shakya's sister; Mithi's daughter figure.

=== Recurring ===
- Biswajit Chakraborty as Siddheshwar Modak – Head and Owner of Siddheshwar Modak Group; Sushoma's husband; Samaresh, Amaresh and Apa's father; Nanda, Siddhartha, Sandy, Sree and Nipa's grandfather; Som's adoptive grandfather; Shakya, Mishti and Srishti's great-grandfather.
- Swagata Basu as Sushoma Ghosh Modak – Matriarch of Modak family; Sushovan's sister; Siddheshwar's wife; Samaresh, Amaresh and Apa's mother; Nanda, Siddhartha, Sandy, Sree and Nipa's grandmother; Som's adoptive grandmother; Shakya, Mishti and Srishti's great-grandmother.
- Kaushik Chakraborty as Samaresh "Samu" Modak – Siddheshwar and Sushoma's elder son; Amaresh and Apa's brother; Arati's widower; Anuradha's husband; Siddhartha and Sreetama's father; Som's adoptive father; Shakya and Mishti's grandfather.
- Moyna Mukherjee as Late Arati Modak – Samaresh's first wife; Siddhartha and Sreetama's mother; Som's adoptive mother; Parbati's close friend; Shakya and Mishti's grandmother.
- Bidipta Chakraborty as Anuradha "Anu" Modak – A famous interior designer; Lalita's daughter; Samaresh's second wife; Som, Siddhartha and Sree's step-mother; Shakya and Mishti's step-grandmother.
- Diya Mukherjee as Sreetama "Sree" Modak Mitra – Samaresh and Arati's daughter; Anuradha's step-daughter; Siddhartha's sister; Som's adopted sister; Nanda, Sandy and Nipa's cousin; Ratul's wife.
- Uday Pratap Singh as Ratul Mitra – Animesh and Susmita's younger son; Rajib's brother; Dhara's cousin; Mithai's friend; Sree's husband; Payel's teacher and her former love interest.
- Prriyam Chakraborty / Kaushambi Chakraborty as Sreenanda "Nanda" Bose Mitra – Apa and Brotin's daughter; Siddhartha, Sree, Sandy and Nipa's cousin; Som's adopted cousin; Rajib's wife; Srishti's mother.
- Sourav Chatterjee as Rajib Mitra – Animesh and Susmita's elder son; Ratul's brother; Dhara's cousin; Nanda's husband; Sristhi's father.
- Enaira as Srishti Mitra – Sreenanda and Rajib's daughter; Shakya and Mishti's cousin.
- Dhrubajyoti Sarkar as Somdeb "Som" Modak – Tridibesh and Joyeeta's son; Samaresh and Arati's adopted son; Anuradha's step-son; Siddhartha and Sree's adopted brother; Nanda, Sandy and Nipa's cousin; Sangita's fake love-interest; Torsha's husband.
- Tonni Laha Roy as Torsha "Tess" Roy Modak – Reboti's daughter; Siddhartha's former obsessive lover, friend and colleague; Mithai's former rival; Som's wife.
- Biswabasu Biswas / Omkar Bhattacharya as Sandeep "Sandy" Modak – Amaresh and Lata's son; Nipa's brother; Nanda, Siddhartha and Sree's cousin; Som's adopted cousin; Pinky's former teacher and husband.
- Ananya Guha as Pinky Agarwal Modak – Omi and Aditya's sister; Sandy's former student and wife.
- Oindrila Saha as Sreenipa "Nipa" Modak Banerjee – Amaresh and Lata's daughter; Sandy's sister; Nanda, Siddhartha and Sree's cousin; Som's adopted cousin; Rudra's wife.
- Fahim Mirza as ACP Rudradeb "Rudra" Banerjee – Siddhartha's senior and best friend; Nipa's husband.
- Sandip Chakraborty as Amaresh "Amu" Modak – Siddheshwar and Sushoma's younger son; Samaresh and Apa's brother; Lata's husband; Sandy and Nipa's father.
- Lopamudra Sinha as Sulata "Lata" Modak – Amaresh's wife; Sandy and Nipa's mother.
- Arpita Mukherjee as Aparajita "Apa" Modak Bose – Siddheshwar and Sushoma's daughter; Samaresh and Amaresh's sister; Brotin's wife; Nanda's mother; Srishti's grandmother.
- Arijit Chowdhury / Raja Chatterjee as Brotin Bose – Apa's husband; Nanda's father; Srishti's grandfather.
- Arkoja Acharya as Basundhara "Dhara" Basu – An IPS Officer; Rajib and Ratul's cousin; Rudra's love interest and close friend.
- Boni Mukherjee as Parbati Das – Sudip's wife; Mithai's mother; Arati's close friend; Shakya and Mishti's grandmother. (Dead)
- Debrishi Chatterjee as Gulti Das – Saswati and Gour's son; Mithai's cousin.
- Suchandra Banerjee as Saswati Das – Gour's wife; Gulti's mother.
- Arnab Bhadra as Gour Das – Saswati's husband; Gulti's father.
- Aditi Chatterjee as Reboti Roy – A lawyer; Torsha's mother.
- Neil Chatterjee (before surgery) / Subhajit Banerjee (after Surgery) as Aditya Agarwal / Roshan Bajaj (Fake) / Parikshit Sharma (Fake) – Modak family business rival; Omi and Pinky's brother; Siddhartha's childhood friend.
- Arghya Mukherjee as Animesh Mitra – Susmita's husband; Rajib and Ratul's father; Srishti's grandfather.
- Sanjuktaa Roy Chowdhury as Susmita Pal Mitra – Animesh's wife; Rajib and Ratul's mother; Srishti's grandmother.
- Niladri Lahiri as Arunesh Ghosh – Former PCG Kolkata branch head; Siddhartha's former boss.
- Chaitali Mukhopadhyay as Renubala Ghosh - Arunesh's wife.
- Gautam Mukherjee as Pratul Biswas – A criminal and divorce lawyer and long time customer of Siddheshwar Sweets; Mithai's namesake uncle.
- Partha Sarathi Deb as Sushovan Ghosh – Sushoma's brother.
- Indranil Mallick as Indra – Sreetama's senior, friend and also her one-sided lover.
- Samir Biswas as Swami Achutananda Maharaj – Gurudeb of Ashram. (Gurukunja)
- Anindya Chakraborty as Dr. Tridibesh Basu aka Tridip – Samaresh's friend; Joyeeta's former lover; Som's father.
- Rupsha Guha as Joyeeta Dutta – Samaresh and Tridibesh's former lover; Som's mother.
- Raktim Samanta as Ganeshwar aka Ghontu – Modak family's relative; Nosu's son; Makhon's brother.
- Debapratim Dasgupta as Nosu – Ghontu's father; Samaresh, Amaresh and Apa's cousin.
- Ashok Mukherjee as Parimal - Nosu's father.
- Pallabi Mukherjee as Swagata - Nosu's mother.
- Promita Chakraborty as Satarupa aka Satty – NRI college friend of Siddharth and Torsha.
- Kunal Banerjee as Kunal – Satty's husband.
- John Bhattacharya as Omkar Agarwal aka Omi / (Monindronath in disguise) – Aditya and Pinky's brother. (Dead)
- Dwaipayan Das as Gogol Mitra – A student and group partner of Mithai at Excel English Academy..
- Deerghoi Paul as Julie - Gogol's girlfriend.
- Sudeshna Roy as Mrs. Chatterjee - English tutor at Excel English Academy.
- Kheyali Dastidar as Sreetama's college teacher aka Hitler mam.
- Arindam Ganguly as Nabin – Husband of Sreetama's college teacher.
- Suchandrima as Madhuchanda Roy – Chief nutritionist at "Wellness Multi-Speciality Hospital".
- Vicky Nandy as Pratik Sanyal – A journalist from Daily News Express who interviewed Mithai.
- Shraboni Banik as Mandira Chatterjee – A famous industrialist.
- Anuradha Mukherjee as Priyanjali Sen aka Angie – Ricky's fake girlfriend, Ricky's love interest .
- Saptarshi Roy as Aniruddha Sen – Angie's father.
- Bhavana Banerjee as Mimi - Channel Coordinator of the serial in which Pinky and Sulata act.
- Ananda Chowdhury as Suman – Director of the serial in which Pinky and Sulata act.
- Baisakhi Marjit as Lalita – Siddheshwar's childhood friend; Anuradha's mother; Samaresh's mother-in-law, a socialite.
- Rudrajit Mukherjee as Sudipto Roy – A special crime branch officer, Rudra's junior colleague.
- Arijita Mukhopadhyay as Promila Laha – A counsellor of F.C.P.
- Subrata Guha Roy as Tarak – Owner of the House the Modaks have rented.
- Gora Dhar as Goju – Promila's right hand.
- Oindrila Banerjee as Ratri Chatterjee – Head of PCG Kolkata Branch.
- Ashmita Chakraborty as Dr. Sharmistha Banerjee – A Gynaecologist who performed Mithai's delivery.
- Arpita Ghosh as Soumi – Nipa's cousin.
- Debraj Mukherjee / Rajkumar Dutta as Mahendra Biswas – Mithi's father
- Arindya Banerjee as Dr. Rohit "Ro" Banerjee – A psychiatrist at Wellness Multi-Speciality Hospital; Mithai's doctor; Mithi's husband.
- Jayati Chakraborty as Mrs. Banerjee – Rohit's mother.
- Sam Bhattacharya as Prantik – Mithi's former love interest and ex-fiańcee.
- Aritram Mukherjee as Sayan – Siddhartha's junior.
- Riya Dutta as Megha – Siddhartha's junior.
- Sangita Ghosh as Sangeeta – Som's former love interest.
- Swarnadipto Ghosh as Rony Chandra Das – Nofor Chandra Das' son; Rajani's brother.
- Shilpa Mondal as Rajani Chandra Das – Nofor Chandra Das' daughter; Rony's sister.
- Taniya Bhowmik as Payel - Ratul's love interest.
- Debomoy Mukherjee as Palash Chowdhury – Lab technician at Wellness Multi-Speciality Hospital; Sangeeta's lover.
- Sayantan Halder as Aniket Hazra - Mithi's fiancé.
- Ayendri Lavnia Roy as Rohini Basu – An actress; Siddharth's obsessive lover.
- Mouli Dutta as Pragya – Nipa's friend and colleague (Dead)

=== Guest appearance ===
- Ditipriya Roy as herself at the opening ceremony of "Mithai Hub"
- Soumili Biswas as herself – judge of cooking show Healthy হেশেল
- Mimi Dutta as herself – Anchor of cooking show Healthy হেশেল
- Jayanta Banerjee as himself – judge of cooking show Healthy হেশেল
- Jojo Mukherjee as herself – an entertainer in the cooking show Healthy হেশেল
- Ankush Hazra as himself at the Marriage Anniversary Party of Som and Torsha to promote to his web series "Shikarpur".
- Sandipta Sen as herself at the Marriage Anniversary Party of Som and Torsha to promote to her web series "Shikarpur".

== Production ==
=== Critics ===
The Times of India quoted the series that "Mithai will tell you a sweet love story".

=== Viewership ===
Mithai became the most watched television series in Bengal. Beginning with a good viewership, after a few weeks, the series soon became the top rated Bengali television program garnering a record viewership, maintaining the first position consistently in the BARC's weekly viewership charts. As on week 4 of 2022, Mithai had been holding the top position on West Bengal Television TRP charts since last 44 weeks starting week 13 of 2021.

=== Special episodes ===
- On 15 April 2021, Mithai held a Mega episode titled as "Mithai Boishakhi Halkhata" marking the 100th episode which is aired for two hours on Thursday. This special episode successfully received 5.94 million impressions and occupied the first position of the TRP rating in Week 15 of 2021.
- On 14 February 2022, Mithai held a Mega episode titled as "1 ghanta Mahaparba" which is aired for one hours on Monday.

=== In popular culture ===
There was a clip of an episode where Mithai (Soumitrisha Kundu) made a new sweet named Uchche Babu. A fan made this sweet in real life and soon it went viral on social media. Few days later, this sweet hit the markets.

== Reception ==
=== 2021 ===
Week	Year	BARC viewership		Ref.
Week	Year	TRP	Rank	Ref.
Week 1	2021	10.0	4	
Week 6	2021	9.0	5	
Week 8	2021	10.9	2	
Week 9	2021	10.2	1	
Week 11	2021	9.8	1	
Week 12	2021	10.1	2	
Week 13	2021	10.5	1	
Week 14	2021	10.6	1	
Week 15	2021	9.3	1	
Week 16	2021	8.8	1	
Week 17	2021	9.4	1	
Week 18	2021	10.9	1	
Week 19	2021	12.5	1	
Week 20	2021	11.9	1	
Week 21	2021	10.8	1	
Week 22	2021	9.3	1	
Week 23	2021	8.0	1	
Week 24	2021	8.3	1	
Week 25	2021	10.3	1	
Week 26	2021	10.5	1	
Week 27	2021	10.9	1	
Week 28	2021	11.5	1	
Week 29	2021	12.3	1	
Week 30	2021	11.5	1	
Week 31	2021	11.7	1	
Week 32	2021	11.0	1	
Week 33	2021	12.2	1	
Week 34	2021	11.4	1	
Week 35	2021	11.2	1	
Week 36	2021	11.5	1	
Week 37	2021	11.3	1	
Week 38	2021	10.8	1	
Week 39	2021	10.6	1	
Week 40	2021	10.6	1	
Week 41	2021	9.6	1	
Week 42	2021	10.9	1	
Week 43	2021	11.1	1	
Week 44	2021	10.2	1	
Week 45	2021	10.8	1	
Week 46	2021	11.2	1	
Week 47	2021	11.1	1	
Week 48	2021	11.5	1	
Week 49	2021	11.1	1	
Week 50	2021	11.2	1	
Week 51	2021	11.0	1	
Week 52	2021	11.0	1	

=== 2022 ===
Week	Year	BARC viewership		Ref.
Week	Year	TRP	Rank	Ref.
Week 1	2022	10.4	1	
Week 2	2022	10.2	1	
Week 3	2022	10.5	1	
Week 4	2022	9.8	1	
Week 5	2022	9.2	5	
Week 6	2022	9.4	3	
Week 7	2022	9.4	2	
Week 8	2022	9.1	3	
Week 9	2022	8.6	4	
Week 10	2022	9.1	3	
Week 11	2022	9.3	2	
Week 12	2022	9.5	2	
Week 13	2022	9.8	1	
Week 14	2022	8.6	1	
Week 15	2022	7.2	3	
Week 16	2022	8.0	2	
Week 17	2022	7.7	3	
Week 18	2022	7.3	2	
Week 19	2022	8.1	2	
Week 20	2022	8.0	2	
Week 21	2022	8.2	2	
Week 22	2022	8.3	1	
Week 23	2022	7.8	1	
Week 24	2022	7.8	1	
Week 25	2022	7.8	3	
Week 26	2022	7.5	5	
Week 27	2022	7.2	4	
Week 28	2022	7.6	4	
Week 29	2022	8.5	1	
Week 30	2022	8.4	1	
Week 31	2022	8.7	1	
Week 32	2022	8.3	1	
Week 33	2022	8.3	1	
Week 34	2022	8.1	2	
Week 35	2022	7.2	4	
Week 36	2022	6.6	5	
Week 37	2022	7.0	6	
Week 38	2022	6.7	6	
Week 39	2022	6.7	5	
Week 40	2022	5.8	7	
Week 41	2022	6.6	8	
Week 42	2022	6.4	8	
Week 43	2022	5.6	10	
Week 44	2022	6.2	10	
Week 45	2022	6.4	7	
Week 46	2022	6.6	7	
Week 47	2022	6.6	7	
Week 48	2022	7.0	8	
Week 49	2022	6.4	9	
Week 50	2022	6.5	8	
Week 51	2022	6.9	9	
Week 52	2022	7.0	8	

=== 2023 ===
Week	Year	BARC viewership		Ref.
Week	Year	TRP	Rank	Ref.
Week 1	2023	7.0	7	
Week 2	2023	6.5	9	
Week 3	2023	5.9	10	
Week 4	2023	5.8	11	
Week 5	2023	5.7	11	
Week 6	2023	6.0	12	
Week 7	2023	7.0	7	
Week 8	2023	5.0	8	
Week 9	2023	6.6	8	
Week 11	2023	5.9	8	
Week 19	2023	3.1	16	

== Soundtrack ==
Tar Nam Mithai

Soundtrack album by Chandrika Bhattacharya
- Released: 4 January 2021
- Genre: Romance Soundtrack
- Length: 1:58
- Language: Bengali
- Label: Zee Bangla

The title song "Tar Nam Mithai" is a music composed by Suvam Moitra and sung by Chandrika Bhattacharya. The song was created for the series.

== Adaptations ==
Language	Title	Original release	Network(s)	Last aired	Notes	Ref.
Bengali	Mithai মিঠাই	4 January 2021	Zee Bangla	9 June 2023	Original	
Tamil	Ninaithale Inikkum நினைத்தாலே இனிக்கும்	23 August 2021	Zee Tamil	25 October 2025	Remake	
Odia	Jhili ଝିଲି	20 September 2021	Zee Sarthak	5 August 2023	Remake	
Hindi	Mithai मिठाई	4 April 2022	Zee TV	24 September 2022	Remake	
Punjabi	Gall Mithi Mithi ਗਲ ਮੀਠੀ ਮੀਠੀ	20 November 2023	Zee Punjabi	30 November 2024	Remake	
Kannada	Rajakumari ರಾಜಕುಮಾರಿ	25 August 2025	Zee Power	4 February 2026	Remake	
