= Lockdown (2021 Bengali film) =

2021 Bengali film

- Lockdown Movie Poster
- Directed by: Abhimanyu Mukherjee
- Starring: Soham Chakraborty; Srabanti Chatterjee; Adrit Roy; Om Prakash Sahani; Rajnandini Pal; Manali Manisha Dey
- Production companies: Artage & Pandemonium Productions
- Distributed by: Artage & Pandemonium Productions
- Release date: 10 September 2021

Lockdown is a Bengali drama film directed by Abhimanyu Mukherjee. This film was released on 10 September 2021 under the banner of Artage and Pandemonium Productions.

== Plot ==
The movie revolves around the lives of three different types of couple and their mental trauma in lockdown during the COVID-19 pandemic situation. The plot is on how they face personal and social crises.

== Cast ==
- Soham Chakraborty
- Srabanti Chatterjee as Madhubala
  - Ananya Guha as teenage Madhubala
- Adrit Roy as Raj
- Om Prakash Sahani
- Rajnandini Paul as Pollabi Bannerjee
- Manali Manisha Dey
- Bhavna Banerjee as Jhuma
