= Mithai (Hindi TV series) =

Indian Hindi television series

- Genre: Family drama; Romance; Comedy
- Created by: Arvind Babbal
- Written by: Dialogues; Rekha Babbal
- Screenplay by: Sancheeta Bose; Arundhati Sharma
- Story by: Ghazala Nargis; Sonal Ganatra
- Directed by: Arvind Babbal
- Starring: Debattama Saha; Aashish Bhardwaj
- Theme music composer: Sanjana Bhatt
- Opening theme: Dilon Ko Chhune Ho...Aayi Re Aayi Mithai Re By Sanjana Bhatt
- Country of origin: India
- Original language: Hindi
- No. of episodes: 149

Production
- Producers: Arvind Babbal; Rekha Babbal
- Cinematography: Mohan Naidu
- Editor: Avadh Narayan Singh
- Camera setup: Multi-camera
- Running time: 22 minutes
- Production company: Arvind Babbal Productions

Original release
- Network: Zee TV
- Release: 4 April – 24 September 2022

Related
- Mithai

Mithai (transl. Sweets) is an Indian Hindi-language romantic comedy drama television series produced by Arvind Babbal under Arvind Babbal Productions. It premiered on 4 April 2022 on Zee TV and it replaced Rishton Ka Manjha in its timeslot. It originally stars Debattama Saha and Aashish Bhardwaj as main leads. It is the remake of the Bengali television series with the same name. The series went off-air on 24 September 2022.

== Plot ==
Mithai is a gifted sweet maker, who is on a quest to establish her professional identity. What happens when Mithai's world collides with Siddharth, a software engineer and heir to a traditional sweet making business.

== Cast ==
=== Main ===
- Debattama Saha as Mithai Choubey (née Gosain) - A sweet seller from Jatipura; Indu's daughter; Siddharth's wife (2022)
- Aashish Bharadwaj as Siddharth Choubey - A software engineer; Girish and Arti's son; Shubham's half-brother; Keerti's brother; Kavita, Shaurya and Karishma's cousin; Mithai's husband (2022)

=== Recurring ===
- Yatindra Chaturvedi as Hari Mohan Choubey - Chandrakanta's husband; Girish, Abhishek and Geetika's father; Kavita, Shubham, Siddharth, Shaurya, Keerti and Karishma's grandfather (2022)
- Shaili Shukla as Chandrakanta Choubey - Hari's wife; Girish, Abhishek and Geetika's mother; Kavita, Shubham, Siddharth, Shaurya, Keerti and Karishma's grandmother (2022)
- Saurabh Agrawal as Girish Choubey - Hari and Chandrakanta's elder son; Abhishek and Geetika's brother; Arti's widower; Shubham, Siddharth and Keerti's father (2022)
- Ajit Jha as Abhishek Choubey - Hari and Chandrakanta's younger son; Girish and Geetika's brother; Aabha's husband; Shaurya and Karishma's father (2022)
- Pooja Dikshit as Aabha Choubey - Abhishek's wife; Shaurya and Karishma's mother (2022)
- Nidhi Mathur as Geetika Choubey Pathak - Hari and Chandrakanta's daughter; Girish and Abhishek's sister; Pramod's wife; Kavita's mother (2022)
- Darpan Srivastava as Pramod Pathak - Geetika's husband; Kavita's father (2022)
- Subha Saxena as Kavita Pathak - Geetika and Pramod's daughter; Shubham, Siddharth, Shaurya, Keerti and Karishma's cousin; Rajiv's wife (2022)
- Priom Gujjar as Rajiv - Rohan's brother; Kavita's husband (2022)
- Kervi Udani as Keerti (née Choubey) - Girish and Arti's daughter; Shubham's half-sister; Siddharth's sister; Kavita, Shaurya and Karishma's cousin; Rohan's wife (2022)
- Nikhilesh Rathore as Shubham Choubey - Girish's illegitimate son; Siddharth and Keerti's half-brother; Kavita, Shaurya and Karishma's cousin (2022)
- Abhishek Mishra as Shaurya Choubey - Abhishek and Aabha's son; Karishma's brother; Kavita, Shubham, Siddharth and Keerti's cousin (2022)
- Nisha Jha as Karishma Choubey - Abhishek and Aabha's daughter; Shaurya's sister; Kavita, Shubham, Siddharth and Keerti's cousin; Rohan's ex-love interest (2022)
- Arjun Singh Shekhawat as Rohan - Rajiv's brother; Karishma's love interest; Keerti's husband (2022)
- Sumit Singh as Apeksha Sharma – Deepti's daughter; Siddharth's obsessive one-sided love interest who wanted to marry him (2022)
- Amita Choksi as Indu Gosain – Mithai's mother; Arti's close friend (2022)
- Narasimhaa Yogi as Bhoora – Mithai's obsessive one-sided love interest (2022)

== Adaptations ==
Language	Title	Original release	Network(s)	Last aired	Notes
Bengali	Mithai মিঠাই	4 January 2021	Zee Bangla	9 June 2023	Original
Tamil	Ninaithale Inikkum நினைத்தாலே இனிக்கும்	23 August 2021	Zee Tamil	25 October 2025	Remake
Odia	Jhili ଝିଲ୍ଲୀ	20 September 2021	Zee Sarthak	30 September 2023	Remake
Hindi	Mithai मिठाई	4 April 2022	Zee TV	24 September 2022	Remake
Punjabi	Gall Mithi Mithi ਗਲ ਮੀਠੀ ਮੀਠੀ	20 November 2023	Zee Punjabi	30 November 2024	Remake
Kannada	Rajakumari ರಾಜಕುಮಾರಿ	25 August 2025	Zee Power	4 February 2026	Remake
