= Shrutakirti =

Wife of Shatrughna in epic Ramayana

- Princess of Videha; Princess consort of Kosala; Queen consort of Madhupura and Vidisha
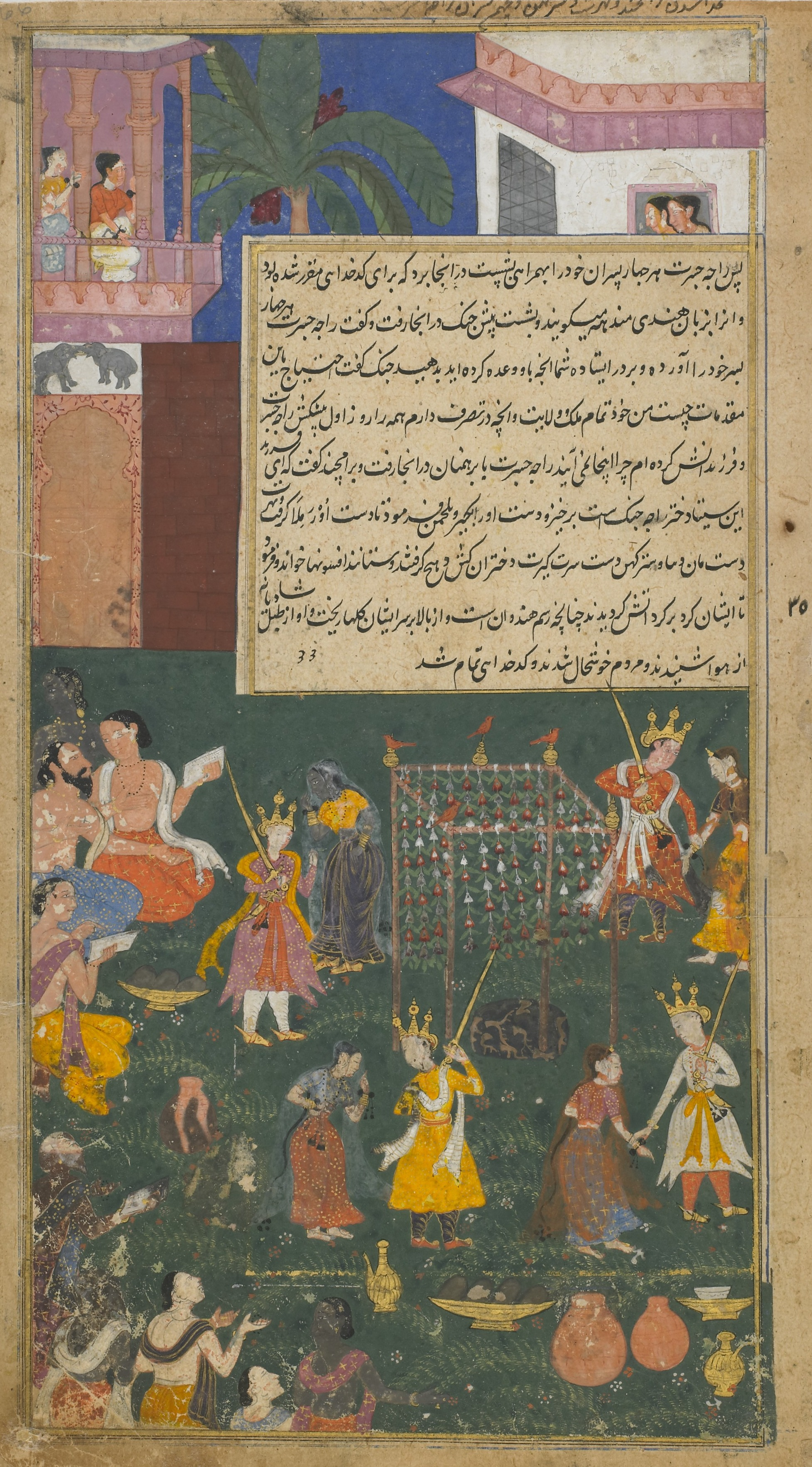
- Wedding ceremony of Shrutakirti and Shatrughna
- Abode: Ayodhya
- Texts: Ramayana and its other versions

Genealogy
- Born: Mithila, Sankashya Videha
- Died: Ayodhya
- Parents: Kushadhvaja (father); Chandrabhaga (mother)
- Siblings: Sita (adoptive cousin); Urmila (cousin); Mandavi (sister)
- Spouse: Shatrughna
- Children: Subahu; Shatrughati
- Dynasty: Videha (by birth); Raghuvamsha-Suryavamsha (by marriage)

Shrutakirti (Sanskrit: श्रुतकीर्ति, romanized: Śrutakīrti) is a princess of Videha, in the Hindu epic Ramayana. She is the wife of Shatrughna and is considered an incarnation of the discus of goddess Lakshmi. Shrutakirti is known for her foresight and dedication.

== Etymology ==
The name Shrutakirti is of Sanskrit origin. Her name means 'renowned and reputed'.

== Legend ==
=== Birth ===
Shrutakirti was born as the younger daughter of King Kushadhvaja and his wife Chandrabhaga. She is the younger sister of Mandavi. Her father was the ruler of Samkasya, but Shrutakirti and Mandavi were brought up in Mithila, along with Sita and Urmila.

=== Marriage to Shatrughna ===
After Rama won the hand of Sita at her svayamvara, his father, King Dasharatha arrived in Mithila for his son's wedding. King Dasharatha noticed that Lakshmana had feelings for Urmila, but according to tradition, Bharata and Mandavi had to marry first. King Dasharatha arranged for Bharata to marry Mandavi and for Shatrughna to marry Shrutakirti, allowing Lakshmana to marry Urmila. Ultimately, all four sisters married the four brothers, strengthening the alliance between the kingdoms. The wedding ceremony was conducted under the guidance of Shatananda.

Shatrughna and Shrutakirti had two sons named Subahu and Shatrughati. While, Subahu became king of Mathura, Shatrughati ruled over Vidisha.

=== Queen of Madhupura ===
Later, Shrutakirti became the queen of Madhupura (Mathura), when her husband Shatrughna captured the capital after killing Lavanasura. Shatrughna came to her every night, worried about his every inexperienced decision regarding the kingdom, and confided in her. She acted as an advisor to her husband and was fully dedicated in his service.

=== Death ===
According to a legend in Tulsidas's Ramcharitmanas, Shrutakirti along with her sister Mandavi, became Sati with her husband, and died after her husband's samadhi. While, Urmila stayed in Ayodhya to look after her son's Angada and Chandraketu, and Sita's sons Lava and Kusha.

== Assessment ==
Though she finds little mention in the original epic, Shrutakirti is known for her foresight. She supported her husband during his brothers exile and often advised her husband on state matters, as the queen of Madhupura. Kavita Kane said, "Shrutakirti stays in the royal palace, living a life of celibacy like her husband Shatrughan."

== Worship ==
In the Medak district of Telangana, there is a temple called Sri Kalyana Ramachandra Sannadhi that is dedicated to Shatrughna and Shrutakirti. This temple is the only one in India that has installed statues of Rama's brothers and their wives.

== In popular culture ==
=== Films ===
The following person portrayed Shrutakirti in the film adaptation of Ramayana.

- Aditi Chatterjee portrayed Shrutakirti in the 1997 Hindi film Lav Kush.
- Surabhi Das portrayed Shrutakriti in the 2026 Hindi film Ramayana: Part 1.

=== Television ===
The following people portrayed Shrutakirti in the television adaptation of Ramayana.

- Poonam Shetty portrayed her in the 1987 series Ramayan and the 1988 series Luv Kush.
- Samreen Naaz / Gulrez Khan portrayed her in the 1997 series Jai Hanuman.
- Malini Kapoor / Arti Puri portrayed her in the 2002 series Ramayan.
- Annu Dangi / Sudeepta Singh portrayed her in the 2008 series Ramayan.
- Tanvi Madhyan portrayed her in the 2015 series Siya Ke Ram.
- Priyanka Shukla portrayed her in the 2015 series Sankat Mochan Mahabali Hanumaan.
- Nikita Tiwari portrayed her in the 2019 series Ram Siya Ke Luv Kush.
- Siddhi Sharma / Charmi Dhami / Sonal Singh portrayed her in the 2024 series Shrimad Ramayan.
- Bhumika Gaur / Pinki Soni portrayed her in 2024 DD National series Kakabhushundi Ramayan- Anasuni Kathayein.

=== Books ===
- Shrutakirti: Sita's Sister by Devi Raghuvanshi
