= Beporoya =

2026 Indian Bengali film

- Theatrical release poster
- Directed by: Abhirup Ghosh
- Screenplay by: Abhirup Ghosh
- Story by: Abhirup Ghosh
- Dialogues by: Abhirup Ghosh
- Produced by: Shrikant Mohta; Mahendra Soni
- Starring: Adrit Roy; Aryaa Ray
- Cinematography: Subhadeep Naskarr
- Edited by: Sumit
- Music by: Songs: Arindom Chatterjee; Score: Kevin Roy George
- Production company: Shree Venkatesh Films
- Distributed by: Shree Venkatesh Films
- Release date: September 18, 2026
- Running time: 120 minutes
- Country: India
- Language: Bengali

Beporoya (transl. Reckless) is a 2026 Indian Bengali musical romantic drama film written and directed by Abhirup Ghosh. It has been produced by Shrikant Mohta and Mahendra Soni under the banner of Shree Venkatesh Films. The film stars Adrit Roy and Aryaa Ray in the lead roles. It marked the film debut of Aryaa Ray.

Arindom Chatterjee has composed the music of the film. Subhadeep Naskarr has done while the cinematography while Subhankar Bhar has served as the additional cinematographer. Sumit handled the editing. The additional dialogues have been written by Soumit Deb and Joydip Banerjee. Ranajit Gharai served as the art director. The film was released in the theatres on 18 September 2026.

== Synopsis ==
Joy proposes Rinku after completing his college. But she refuses to marry him. She wants to live on her own terms and her conservative father is also against the relationship. The rejection leaves Joy heartbroken. He slowly develops a desire for revenge. Overtime, his anger makes him an alcoholic and toxic person whose sole motive becomes revenge.

== Cast ==
- Adrit Roy as Joy
- Aryaa Ray as Rinku
- Shantilal Mukhopadhyay as Rinku's father

== Marketing ==
The teaser of Beporoya released on 14 August 2026. The trailer of the film was dropped on 10 September 2026.

== Soundtrack ==
Arindom Chatterjee has composed the music of the film while the background score has been rendered by Kevin Roy George. The lyrics have been penned by Prasen, Rimo and Argha.

The first song "Bolo Ki Tumi" was released on 19 August 2026. The second single "Phiriye Daao" was released on 26 August 2026. The third single "Bhule Jeona Please" was dropped on 2 September 2026. The fourth song "Dhiki Dhiki" was released on 15 September 2026. It was choreographed by Pankaj Seal. The rest of the songs were released after the film was released.

Track listing
No.	Title	Lyrics	Singer(s)	Length
1.	"Bolo Ki Tumi"	Prasen	Aarvan	3:38
2.	"Phiriye Daao"	Prasen	Nikhil D'souza	5:49
3.	"Bhule Jeona Please"	Prasen	Arindom Chatterjee, Shirsha Chakraborty	3:53
4.	"Dhiki Dhiki"	Rimo, A04, Sudip	Suchona Shelly, A04 and Sudip	2:40
5.	"Bhule Jeona Please Unplugged"	Prasen	Nikhil Paul George	3:56
6.	"Phiriye Daao Encore"	Prasen	Nikhil D'souza	3:38
7.	"Phiriye Daao Revisited"	Prasen	Sudipto Chowdhury	4:04
Total length:				27:38

== Reception ==
=== Critical reception ===
Eshna Bhattacharya of The Times of India rated the film 2/5 stars and wrote "Beporoya is a weaker film than its premise promised, not for lack of a clear starting idea, but because that idea gets buried under derivative tonal choices, thin writing, and lead performances that don't consistently hold the screen." She appreciated the makers for experimenting with a turbulent romance script in the Bengali film industry, the cameo appearance at the end, the cinematography, performance of the lead actors, the comic sequences and the practical ending but criticized the film for borrowing influences from multiple shows, lack of its own originality, the average costume designs, the poor writing, weak dialogues, lack of raw emotional moments, usage of the formulaic commercial template, overall weak music and stereotypic family background setting.

Souvik Saha of Cine Kolkata rated the film 2.5/5 stars and opined "Beporoya is more interesting in concept than in execution, but there is enough ambition, entertainment value, performance and visual appeal to make it a worthwhile one-time viewing for the right audience." He praised the nine-stage concept of love shown in the film, Adrit Roy's performance, the filming locations, the commercial touch, Shantilal Mukhopadhyay's comedy, the cinematography, the music and the ambiguous ending but criticized abrupt emotional transformation of Adrit's character, weakly written character of the female lead, forced comedy in certain scenes, uneven tonal shifts and the below par screenplay that relies on melodrama.

A critic from Aaro Ananda rated the film 4/10 stars and worded it as "A failed attempt." They praised Adrit's performance, the commercial elements in the film, the cinematography, the music, the locations, the scale, the dialogues and the comedic sequences but bemoaned the weak screenplay and the poor writing. Nirmal Dhar of Sangbad Pratidin reviewed the film and opined "Love is type of cancer which has nine stages. In the way of presenting those nine stages, the only best thing is the intermediate comic sequences." He applauded the usage of songs, the uniqueness despite being a commercial template film, the melodramatic acting of Adrit, the cinematography but bemoaned the weak screenplay, weak performance of Aryaa in the comic scenes the multiple loopholes in the storyline.
