= Noor Jahaan =

- Noor Jahan film poster
- Directed by: Abhimanyu Mukherjee
- Screenplay by: Abhimanyu Mukherjee
- Story by: Abhimanyu Mukherjee (adapted story); Nagraj Manjule (original story)
- Based on: Sairat by Nagraj Manjule
- Produced by: Raj Chakraborty; Shrikant Mohta; Abdul Aziz
- Starring: Adrit Roy; Puja Cherry; Aparajita Adhya
- Cinematography: Souvik Basu
- Edited by: Md. Kalam
- Music by: Savvy Gupta
- Production companies: SVF Entertainment; Jaaz Multimedia; Raj Chakraborty Productions
- Distributed by: SVF Entertainment; Jaaz Multimedia
- Release date: 16 February 2018
- Countries: India; Bangladesh
- Language: Bengali

Noor Jahaan is a 2018 Indo-Bangla joint production romantic thriller film written and directed by Abhimanyu Mukherjee, produced by Raj Chakraborty under the banners of Raj Chakraborty Production of India and Jaaz Multimedia of Bangladesh and co-produced by SVF Entertainment. The film features newcomer Adrit Roy and Puja Cherry in the lead roles. It is a remake of the 2015 Marathi film Sairat and was shot in Krishnath College School, Berhampore.

== Plot ==
Noor Jahaan is the story of two young lovers, Noor (played by Adrit Roy) and Jahaan (played by Puja Cherry). Noor is a boy from poor family who got the highest percentage in HSC exam in his district. Jahaan is a girl from rich family who is the daughter of a famous politician. Her mother, Amina Begum (played by Aparajita Auddy), They meet in college and fall in love with each other .Jahan mothers finds them out and they get in trouble.Noor and Jahaan dance the night away and she gets pregnant at their nuptial night. They try to elope but fail. After this, they plan to run away again but almost get caught. They find one way of living together - that is death. It shows in the scene a climax where there is a pause.

== Cast ==
- Adrit Roy as Noor
- Puja Cherry as Jahaan
- Aparajita Auddy as Amena Begum/Jahan's mother
- Nader Chowdhury
- Supriyo Dutta
- Chikon Ali
- Faizan Ahmed Boby
- Shamim Ahamed

== Production ==
Noor Jahaan, an Indo-Bangladeshi joint venture, is co-produced by Raj Chakraborty Productions, SVF Entertainment and Jaaz Multimedia. By early July, Raj Chakraborty said that the film was nearly finished shooting its portion in Murshidabad, West Bengal and would start its Bangladesh portion soon. However, due to controversies of joint ventures in 2017, the government of Bangladesh began a temporary halt on international co-productions. Despite having 50% of the film's cast and crew being from Bangladesh, Raj Chakraborty claimed that at this point the future of the film was uncertain.

== Soundtrack ==
Noor Jahaan

Soundtrack album by Savvy Gupta
- Released: 2018
- Recorded: 2017
- Genre: Feature film soundtrack
- Length: 11:23
- Labels: SVF Music; Jaaz Music
- Producer: Savvy Gupta

Savvy Gupta chronology
Rangbaz (2017)	Noor Jahaan (2018)	Inspector Notty K (2018)

Singles from Noor Jahaan
- 1. "Shona Bondhu" Released: 20 July 2017; 2. "Mon Boleche" Released: 2 January 2018

The soundtrack for Noor Jaahan is composed by Savvy Gupta. The single from the soundtrack, "Shona Bondhu", was released on 20 July 2017, while the music video was released the same day. The song, composed by Savvy, sung by Raj Barman and Prashmita and with lyrics rewritten by Soumyadeb, is a remake of the classic song "Shona Bondhu" by Abdul Gafur Hali. The music video of the second single, "Mon Boleche", was released on 1 January 2018. "Mon Boleche", sung by Imran Mahmudul and Dilshad Nahar Kona, was announced on Jaaz Multimedia's Facebook page on 31 December 2017.

All lyrics are written by Srijato Bandyopadhyay and Soumyadeb Basu; all music is composed by Savvy Gupta.

Track Listing:
No.	Title	Lyrics	Music	Singer(s)	Length
1.	"Shona Bondhu"	Abdul Gafur Hali and Soumyadeb Basu	Savvy Gupta	Raj Barman and Prashmita Paul	3:02
2.	"Mon Boleche"	Soumyadeb Basu	Savvy Gupta	Imran Mahmudul and Dilshad Nahar Kona	4:21
3.	"Noor Jahaan" (Title track)	Srijato Bandyopadhyay	Savvy Gupta	Raj Barman and Lagnajita Chakraborty	4:00
Total length:					11:23

== Release ==
The film was originally scheduled to release on 1 September 2017, but the release was delayed due to the temporary ban on co-productions in Bangladesh. It was later announced that the film would release on 16 February 2018, on the weekend of Valentine's Day.
