= Adrit Roy =

Indian film actor

- Born: 25 May 1992 (age 34); Kolkata, West Bengal, India
- Occupation: Actor
- Years active: 2018–
- Known for: Noor Jahaan (2018) Prem Amar 2 (2019) Mithai (2021) Mittir Bari (2024)
- Spouse: Kaushambi Chakraborty (m. 2024)

Adrit Roy (born 25 May 1992) is an Indian Bengali film and television actor and is known for portraying Siddharth Modak in Mithai and Dhrubo Mitra in Mittir Bari.

== Early life and education ==
Roy was born in Kolkata. He went to La Martiniere Calcutta school, where he was active in theater and performance.

== Career ==
Roy made his film debut playing the eponymous role in Abhimanyu Mukherjee's 2018 film Noor Jahaan. In 2019, he starred in Prem Amar 2 as Joy. He also acted in Dev Entertainment Ventures' Password, directed by Kamaleshwar Mukherjee, as well as Raj Chakraborty Productions' Parineeta, directed by Raj Chakraborty.

== Filmography ==
Year	Film	Role	Notes	Ref.
2018	Noor Jahaan	Noor	Debut Film; Indo-Bangladesh joint production	
2019	Prem Amar 2	Joy Chowdhury	Indo-Bangladesh joint production	
2019	Password	Advait Upadhyay "Adi"		
2019	Parineeta	Ananda		
2021	Lockdown	Raj		
2026	Beporoya	Joy		

== Television ==
Year	Title	Role	Language	Channel	Notes	Production company(s)	Ref
2021–2023	Mithai	Siddharth Modak	Bengali	Zee Bangla	Lead Role	Zee Bangla Productions	
2024–2025	Mittir Bari	Dhrubo Mitra	Bengali	Zee Bangla	Lead Role	Nideas Creations	
2026–Present	Kumkum	Ishaan Sinha	Bengali	Star Jalsha	Lead Role	Bengal Talkies	

=== Television movies ===
Year	Title	Role	Language	Comments
2020	Ami Didi No. 1	Aditya	Bengali	Zee Bangla Originals

=== Special appearances ===
Year	Serial	Channel	Role	Character	Reference
2021	Dadagiri Unlimited Season 9	Zee Bangla	Participant	Siddharth	
2022	Didi No. 1 Season 9	Zee Bangla	Participant	Siddharth	

== Awards ==
Year	Award	Category	Name
2022	Zee Bangla Sonar Sansar 2022	Best Actor	Mithai
2022	Zee Bangla Sonar Sansar 2022	Priyo Juti(with Soumitrisha Kundu)	Mithai
2022	West Bengal Tele Academy Awards	Best Actor	Mithai
2022	Telly Adda Awards 2022	Best Actor	Mithai
2022	Telly Adda Awards 2022	Best On Screen Couple(with Soumitrisha Kundu)	Mithai
2023	Zee Bangla Sonar Sansar 2023	Best Actor	Mithai
2023	Telly Cine Award	Best Actor (Television)	Mithai
2023	TV 9 Bangla Ghorer Bioscope Awards	Priyo Juti(with Soumitrisha Kundu)	Mithai
2023	TV 9 Bangla Ghorer Bioscope Awards	Best Actor (Television)	Mithai
2025	Zee Bangla Sonar Sansar 2025	Priyo Bor	Mittir Bari
2026	Starlight Ananya Samman 2026	Best Actor	Beporoya
