= Password (2019 Indian film) =

2019 Indian Bengali-language film

- Password official poster
- Directed by: Kamaleshwar Mukherjee
- Written by: Rana Mukherjee
- Produced by: Dev Adhikari; Gurupada Adhikari; Sandeep Agarwal
- Starring: Dev; Parambrata Chatterjee; Paoli Dam; Rukmini Maitra; Adrit Roy; Trina Saha
- Cinematography: Avik Mukhopadhyay
- Edited by: Raviranjan Maitra
- Music by: Savvy
- Production company: Dev Entertainment Ventures
- Distributed by: Dev Entertainment Ventures; Echo Entertainment
- Release date: 2 October 2019
- Running time: 137:53 minutes
- Country: India
- Language: Bengali

Password (subtitled as You are being watched) is a 2019 Indian Bengali-language techno-thriller film written and directed by Kamaleswar Mukherjee. The film stars Dev, Parambrata Chattopadhyay, Paoli Dam, Rukmini Maitra while Adrit Roy and Trina Saha played supporting roles. The film revolves around the dark side of social networking, and deals with stealing of password and privacy issue.It was released on 2 October 2019. Upon release, the film received critical acclaim, where critics praised the concept, action sequences, visual effects, message, music and cast performances. Despite receiving critical acclaim, the film didn't manage to do well at the box-office. It was remade into English as Off the Grid (2025).

== Plot ==
Set in the backdrop of 1984 Bhopal disaster, where Ismailov's parents died amidst the leakage of methyl isocyanate in the disaster of Bhopal. Failing to get justice, Ismailov takes the law into his own hands to kill Joseph Anderson, CEO of A to Z e-commerce and the main mastermind behind this Gas tragedy, along with all his associates. DCP Rohit Dasgupta of Kolkata Police investigates to find out Ismailov and his den of Onion in Bhopal, who hacks Byblis and Darling tone software, a part of the A to Z e-commerce company, thus making his base in the Indian Subcontinent. Ismailov also hacks the IMF server and gets all defence insecurities illegally.

== Cast ==
- Dev as DCP Rohit Dasgupta, a trained cyber expert from IIT Kharagpur
- Alamgir Hossain Raj as a Musical Artist.
- Rukmini Maitra as Nisha Chatterjee, an ethical hacker
- Parambrata Chatterjee as Ismailov, a darknet mastermind
- Paoli Dam as Mariom, Ismailov's wife and partner of darknet
- Adrit Roy as Advait Upadhyay, Nisha's boyfriend
- Krishno Kishore Mukhopadhyay as RAW chief Uttam Barua
- Trina Saha as Tina, Nisha's sister
- Abhisekh Singh as Ismailov's assistant
- Saurav Das, cameo in the song "Aye Khuda"

== Soundtrack ==
Password

Soundtrack album by Savvy
- Released: 27 September 2019
- Recorded: 2019
- Studio: Neo Sound
- Genre: Feature film soundtrack
- Length: 6:51
- Language: Bengali
- Label: Zee Music Bangla
External audio
- Audio Jukebox on YouTube

The soundtrack is composed by Savvy and lyrics by Riddhi Barua and Soham Majumdar.

Track listing
No.	Title	Lyrics	Singer(s)	Length
1.	"Trippy Lage"	Riddhi Barua	Nikhita Gandhi, Shashwat Singh	3:05
2.	"Aye Khuda"	Soham Majumdar	KK	3:46
Total length:				6:51

== Marketing and release ==
The official teaser of the film was unveiled by Dev Entertainment Ventures on 15 August 2019. The official 4K teaser 2 of the film was unveiled by Dev Entertainment Ventures on 1 September 2019.

The film flopped at box-office. Some scenes are modified like a nude woman's back side has been blurred, skulls scattering everywhere are blurred. Some violent portions have also been trimmed. It was released on 2 October, coinciding with 2019 Puja holidays.
