= 1993 Kolkata firing =

Indian police shooting of protestors

21 July conflict
- Date: 21 July 1993
- Location: Esplanade, Kolkata, West Bengal, India

Parties
Government of West Bengal: Calcutta Police; Left Front: Communist Party of India (Marxist)	Indian National Congress: Indian Youth Congress

Lead figures
Jyoti Basu (Chief Minister of West Bengal); Buddhadeb Bhattacharjee	Mamata Banerjee (Leader)

Casualties and losses
Many police were injured, Government property were damaged and cars were led fire	13 deaths

The 1993 Kolkata Firing was an incident of firing by Calcutta Police in 1993 on Indian National Congress workers. The State Youth Congress led by Mamata Banerjee had organised a protest march to Writers' Building on 21 July 1993 against the then Communist government of the state, demanding photo voter identity cards be made mandatory to ensure fair elections. The Police fired on the protesters killing 13 people and injuring many others.

The Trinamool Congress on assuming power in 2011 constituted one-man commission of Justice (retired) Sushanto Chattopadhyay, a former Chief Justice of Orissa High Court to investigate the incident.

== The Incident ==
The communist Left Front had won the previous 1991 state elections in West Bengal with a large mandate, however the opposition parties had alleged electoral fraud.

The incident took place on 21 July 1993, when Mamata Banerjee, then state President of Indian Youth Congress, the youth wing of the Indian National Congress in West Bengal, organised a protest march to Writers' Building, the seat of then communist-led Government of West Bengal. They demanded voter photo-ID cards be made mandatory to ensure free and fair polling. However, around 11 AM, one kilometre before the building, they were intervened by the state police, near Metro cinema on Mayo Road and Dorina Road crossing at Esplanade. The police fired at them, resulting in the death of 13 people and several injuries.

According to Tushar Talukdar, city police commissioner at the time, in anticipation of the protest march, police contingents were deployed near Writers' Building and Raj Bhavan (Governor's residence). Also a Prohibitory Order under Section 144 of CrPC was enforced beyond Mayo Road crossing. The group led by Mamata Banerjee was stopped near the Tea Board office on B.T.M. Sarani (Brabourne Road), while another group near Mayo Road crossing allegedly went out of control.

At the press conference after the incident, Talukdar had claimed that he was unaware of the firing. When questioned by journalists, regarding why a junior officer had apparently ordered the firing without his consent, and why the cops violating the set norms, chose to fire at the torso of protestors instead of the legs, Talukdar said the police "will inquire into it".

== Aftermath ==
Union Home Minister S. B. Chavan, who had rushed to Calcutta after the incident, advised the state Government to order a judicial probe into the incident. However, no probe was ordered by the Chief Minister, Jyoti Basu, who supported the police actions saying they had "done a good job" in preventing the alleged attempted siege of the Writers' Building.

An executive inquiry was subsequently undertaken; Kanwaljit Singh, then joint CP in charge of Writers' Building carried out the executive inquiry for Dorina Crossing events, while D. C. Vajpai investigated the Mayo Road events. 21 years later these officials informed an inquiry commission that reports files have been missing both from the Kolkata police headquarters at Lalbazar and the state secretariat at Writers' Building.

== Legacy ==
The firing incident was a turning point in the political career of Mamata Banerjee, who was also injured in the incident. She already was a rising figure in the state politics, but now had public sympathy as well. In the coming years, the 21 July anniversary of the incident has become the largest yearly public rally of the party and Banerjee amassed a huge youth following to become an important opposition leader. She formed All India Trinamool Congress in 1997, which formed state government in 2011.

Today, both the Congress and the Trinamool Congress continue to observe 21 July as a "Martyrs' Day" in West Bengal. The Trinamool Congress organises the annual 21 July Martyr's Day Rally at Esplanade More (Dharmatala) in Kolkata.

== 2011 Inquiry ==
Mamata Banerjee eventually became the Chief Minister of West Bengal in 2011, and in May 2011, the state government formed a judicial commission, headed by Sushanto Chattopadhyay, a former Chief Justice of Orissa High Court, to inquire into the police firing. Most of the politicians of the time deposed statements with the commission, including Biman Bose, state chief of the West Bengal Communist Party of India (Marxist), and Buddhadeb Bhattacharjee, former West Bengal chief minister, who was then Information and Cultural Affairs minister in the Jyoti Basu-led state Government of West Bengal and also in charge of the Calcutta Police. In his 50-minute deposition on 26 February 2014, Bhattacharjee justified the firing and also stated, "At that time, in principle I did not feel the need for judicial inquiry and I still stick to my views."

Also in the month of February 2014, five former police officers of the period were summoned twice in front on the panel. This included, Tushar Talukdar (then police commissioner), D C Vajpai (then additional CP), R K Johry (former joint CP), N K Singh (former DC-south) and Kanwaljit Singh (then joint CP in charge of Writers). The home secretary during 1993, Manish Gupta, who is now power minister in ruling state cabinet, in his deposition stated that he was against police firing. On 20 February, on a petition filed by three retired IPS officers, Dinesh Vajpai, RK Juhuri and Nawal Kishore Singh challenging a notice served to them by the commission. On 28 January, the Calcutta High Court stayed the notice. This was in accordance of its previous 2011 judgement that "the commission may summon the three former IPS officers after completing the deposition of all other witnesses". Final verdict is however awaited.

To date, the panel has heard 350 witnesses, and is expected to submit its report by April 2014. As the victims were from lower-middle-class families and did not have any criminal record, their families are expected to receive monetary compensation. During the 2014 inquiry, Justice (retired) Sushanta Chatterjee, former Chief Justice of the Orissa High Court described the police response as “unprovoked and unconstitutional”. “The commission has come to the conclusion that the case is even worse than Jallianwala Bagh massacre,” said Justice Chatterjee.

== See also ==
- List of cases of police brutality in India
