= Aditi Chatterjee =

Bengali film actress

- Born: 26 September 1976 (age 50); Kolkata, India
- Education: South Point School
- Occupation: Actress
- Years active: 1987—2000; 2011—present
- Spouse: Divorced
- Parents: Suniti Chatterjee (father); Manju Chatterjee (mother)

Aditi Chatterjee (also known as Adetee Chatterjee) is an Indian actress who is known for her work in Bengali cinema and television.

When she was in her fifth standard in South Point School, Chatterjee was spotted by Meenakshi Goswami who offered her a role in a Bengali TV series. It was followed by a string of roles in Television. She made her Bollywood debut with her role as Shrutakirti in Lav Kush (1997). She portrayed Trina in Rituparno Ghosh's Dahan (1997). Her first starring role was opposite Prosenjit Chatterjee in Swapan Saha's Bengali drama film Nayaner Alo (1998). She was widely adulated for her role as Nandini opposite Saswata Chatterjee in Ravi Ojha's Ek Akasher Niche. At the peak of her career she abruptly quit her career and went abroad. She made her comeback with a role in Babu Banik's Bengali TV series Raashi, in 2011. She has also appeared in popular Bengali TV series such as Trishna, Rupkatha, Akashchoyan, Kiranmala, Goyenda Ginni, Jai Kali Kalkattawali, Karunamoyee Rani Rashmoni, Ki Kore Bolbo Tomay, Mithai to name few.

== Career ==
Chatterjee made her acting debut when she was in her fifth standard. She was a trainee of Indian Life Saving Society, formerly known as Anderson Club. There she appeared in a water ballet directed by Meenakshi Goswami, and it was broadcast on Doordarshan. Goswami then offered her a small role in her directorial venture Giribala (1987). She, later became a deft actress when she hit her teenage. Sanjib Dey cast her as Kabita in Bengali drama film Bhalobasar Ashroy (1994). In 1997, She appeared in a host of films landing prominent roles. She starred as Mukta opposite Prosenjit Chatterjee in Swapan Saha's love triangle film Tomake Chai (1997). She accepted the role of Shrutakirti in Lav Kush (1997). Rituparno Ghosh cast her as Trina in his National Award winning film Dahan (1997), alongside Rituparna Sengupta portraying Romita and Indrani Haldar portraying Shrabana. It is based on Suchitra Bhattacharya's novel of the same name. The film bespeaks the contemporary social affliction that the women underwent. Trina wants to quit her engagement with her fiancé as he is accused of molesting a woman. Anyway her mother says that such accusations are often made against people who are financially very successful.

She once again collaborated with Swapan Saha and Prosenjit Chatterjee in the romantic drama film Nayaner Alo (1998). It is based on Belal Ahmed's Noyoner Alo (1984) which itself was a major financial success. She portrayed Alo whereas Prosenjit Chatterjee portrayed the role of Jiban. She has been interrogated for numerous times as to why she did not feature opposite Prosenjit Chatterjee any more. Aditi did not unfurl anything in this regard. Instead, she said that she was satisfied with her roles in small screen.

In 2000, she was offered to portray Nandini opposite Saswata Chatterjee in Rabi Ojha's megaserial Ek Akasher Niche. The role catapulted her to stardom. Anyway she was later replaced by Debolina Dutta (Note: Debolina Dutta also claimed to widespread fame for her role as Nandini in Ek Akasher Niche.) as she abruptly quit her acting career in 2000.

After she separated from her husband, she made her acting comeback with the role of Paroma in Babu Banik's Bengali TV series Raashi, in 2011. The series attained major popularity and ran till 2015. She portrayed Nandini Mitra in Goyenda Ginni. Her role as Reboti Roy in Mithai received wider attention from viewers. She accepted a role in Jit Chakraborty's Kathamrita (2022). She received viewer's adulation for her role in Panchami. Chatterjee was cast in the role of a shapeshifting nagin in Panchami.

== Filmography ==
=== Films ===
| Year | Title | Role | Note | Ref. |
|---|---|---|---|---|
| 1994 | Bhalobasar Ashroy | Kabita | | |
| 1997 | Dahan | Trina | | |
| 1997 | Lav Kush | Shrutakirti | | |
| 1997 | Matir Manush | | | |
| 1997 | Mittir Barir Chhoto Bou | | | |
| 1997 | Sabar Upare Maa | Sumi/Riya | | |
| 1997 | Tomake Chai | Mukta | | |
| 1998 | Maayer Dibyi | | | |
| 1998 | Nayaner Alo | Alo | | |
| 2000 | Kalankini Badhu | Mou | | |
| 2022 | Kathamrita | Ananya | | |

=== Telefilms ===
| Year | Title | Role | Note | Ref. |
|---|---|---|---|---|
| | Pather Dabi | Bharati | | |

== TV series ==
| Year | Title | Role | Channel | Note | Ref. |
|---|---|---|---|---|---|
| 1987 | Giribala | Young Giribala | DD Bangla | | |
| 1996 | Trishna | | | | |
| | Rupkatha | Kabita | | | |
| | Bhalobasa Mandobasa | | | | |
| | Akashchoyan | | | | |
| 1997 | Shyaola | | Zee Bangla | | |
| 2000 | Ek Akasher Niche | Nandini | Alpha Bangla | Later replaced by Debolina Dutta | |
| 2011–2015 | Raashi | Paroma | Zee Bangla | | |
| 2013–2014 | Dutta Barir Chhoto Bou | | ETV Bangla | | |
| 2012 | Checkmate | Shampa Dasgupta | Star Jalsha | | |
| 2014 | Byomkesh | Damayanti Sen | Colors Bangla | | |
| 2014–2016 | Kiranmala | Rani Rupmati | Star Jalsha | | |
| 2015–2016 | Goyenda Ginni | Nandini Mitra | Zee Bangla | | |
| 2016 | Rudrani | | Colors Bangla | | |
| 2016–2019 | Rakhi Bandhan | Rikhiya | Star Jalsha | | |
| 2017 | Debipaksha | Madhavi Dev Barman | Star Jalsha | | |
| 2017–2019 | Jai Kali Kalkattawali | Sarbani Mukherjee | Star Jalsha | | |
| 2018–2019 | Manasa | Devi Chandi | Colors Bangla | | |
| 2019–2020 | Ekhane Aakash Neel | Basobi Chatterjee | Star Jalsha | | |
| 2019–2021 | Ki Kore Bolbo Tomay | Anuradha Sen | Zee Bangla | | |
| 2019–2022 | Mahapeeth Tarapeeth | Rajkumari | Star Jalsha | | |
| 2021 | Karunamoyee Rani Rashmoni | Bhairavi | Zee Bangla | | |
| 2021 | Mithai | Reboti Roy | Zee Bangla | | |
| 2022 | Pilu | Sohini Basu Mullick | Zee Bangla | | |
| 2022–2023 | Panchami | Shonkhini/Kamini | Star Jalsha | | |
| 2023–2024 | Sandhyatara | | Star Jalsha | | |
| 2023–2024 | Jol Thoi Thoi Bhalobasha | Anusuya | Star Jalsha | | |
| 2023 – 2025 | Kon Gopone Mon Bheseche | Aparajita Mallick | Zee Bangla | | |
| 2024 | Kolonko | Tithi | Hoichoi | | |
| 2024 – 2025 | Dui Shalik | | Star Jalsha | | |
| 2025 –Present | Lokkhi Jhnapi | | Star Jalsha | | |
| 2026 –Present | Ganga | | Star Jalsha | | |

=== Mahalaya ===
| Year | Title | Role | Channel | Ref. |
|---|---|---|---|---|
| 2018 | Jayang Dehi | Chandi | Colors Bangla | |
| 2021 | Nanarupe Mahamaya | Khullana | Zee Bangla | |

== Awards ==
| Year | Award | Category | Character | Name |
|---|---|---|---|---|
| 2016 | Zee Bangla Sonar Sansar | Priyo Jaa | Nonda | Goyenda Ginni |
| 2025 | Zee Bangla Sonar Sansar | Priyo Sashuri | Aparajita | Kon Gopone Mon Bheseche |
