= Lav Kush =

- Theatrical release poster
- Directed by: V. Madhusudhana Rao
- Written by: Bhring Tupkaria (dialogues); Dev Kohli; Bhring Tupkaria (lyrics)
- Based on: Uttar Ramayan
- Produced by: Dilip Kanikaria
- Starring: Jeetendra; Jaya Prada; Arun Govil; Dara Singh; Pran
- Cinematography: K. S. Prakash Rao
- Edited by: K. Vijaya Babu
- Music by: Raamlaxman
- Production company: Devyank Arts
- Release date: 25 July 1997
- Running time: 165 minutes
- Country: India
- Language: Hindi

Lav Kush is a 1997 Indian mythological film, produced by Dilip Kanikaria under the Devyank Arts banner and directed by V. Madhusudhana Rao. It is based on Valmiki's Uttar Ramayan from the Indian epic Ramayana. The music of the film was composed by Raamlaxman. It stars Jeetendra as Rama, Jaya Prada as Sita, Arun Govil as Lakshmana, Dara Singh as Hanuman and Pran as Valmiki.

Upon its release, the film was a financial disaster grossing ₹43 lakh at the box office.

== Cast ==
- Jeetendra as Lord Rama
- Jaya Prada as Goddess Sita
- Arun Govil as Lakshmana
- Dara Singh as Lord Hanuman
- Pran as Maharishi Valmiki
- M. Balayya as Vashistha
- Tiku Talsania as Prachodi
- Jayshree Gadkar as Kausalya
- Beena Banerjee as Shanta
- Isha Gupta as Urmila
- Churni Ganguly as Mandavi
- Aditi Chatterjee as Shrutakirti
- Aruna Irani as Goddess Bhudevi
- Master Baladitya as Lava
- Baby Shreshtha as Kusha

== Soundtrack ==
The songs were composed by Raamlaxman and penned by Dev Kohli and Bhring Tupkari. Lata Mangeshkar, Asha Bhosle, Suresh Wadkar, S. P. Balasubrahmanyam have lent their voices for the soundtrack.

Song	Singer
"Yeh Vidhi Ki Dekho"	S. P. Balasubrahmanyam
"Barson Ka Hreen Chukane Aayi"	S. P. Balasubrahmanyam, Lata Mangeshkar
"Varnan Kare Kya"	Lata Mangeshkar, Asha Bhosle
"Katha Ram Ki"	Lata Mangeshkar, Asha Bhosle
"Pativrata Siya"	Lata Mangeshkar, Asha Bhosle
"Suno Suno Mere"	Lata Mangeshkar, Asha Bhosle
"Nanha Munna Aayega Mehmaan"	Lata Mangeshkar, Asha Bhosle, Usha Mangeshkar
"O Dharti Maa"	Asha Bhosle
"Jai Jai Ram Siyaram"	Lata Mangeshkar, Asha Bhosle, Suresh Wadkar
"Karo Nahin"	Suresh Wadkar
"Surya Mantra"	Suresh Wadkar
"Ram Raj Aayo Re, Aayo Re Aayo Re"	Kavita Krishnamurthy, Alka Yagnik
"Tak Dhina Dhin"	Alka Yagnik, Kumar Sanu
