= Soumitrisha Kundu =

Indian actress

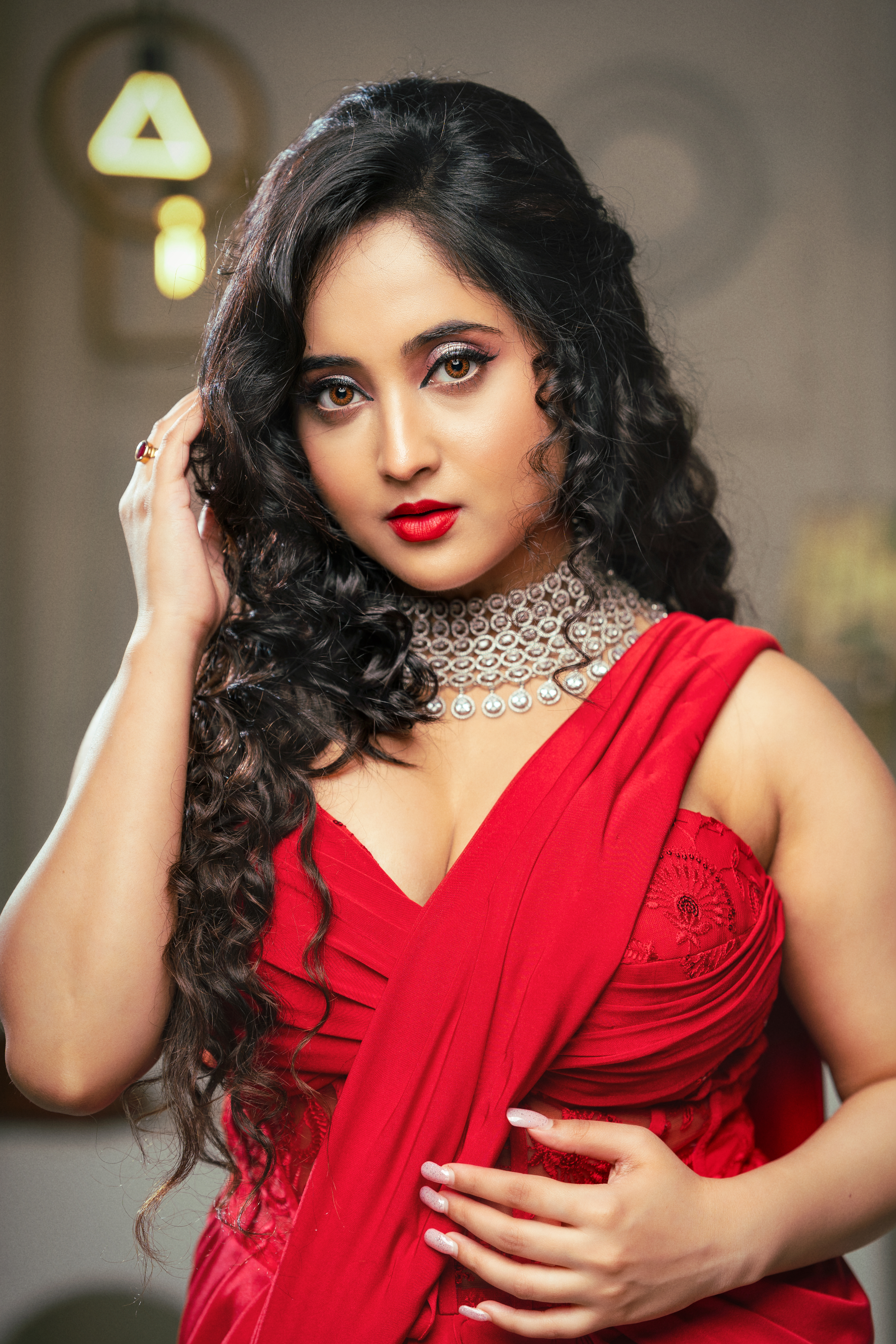
- Soumitrisha in an event
- Born: 24 February 2000 (age 26); Barasat, West Bengal, India
- Other names: STK, Soumi, Mithai
- Education: Barasat Girls' High School
- Alma mater: Netaji Subhas Open University
- Occupation: Actress
- Years active: 2017–present
- Notable work: Kone Bou (2019); Mithai (2021); Pradhan (2023); Kaalratri (2024)

Soumitrisha Kundu (born 24 February 2002), also known by the initialism STK, is an Indian actress who works in Bengali film and television industry. Acclaimed for her acting skills, she is one of the promising young actresses in the Bengali Film Industry. She made her acting debut in the drama series E Amar Gurudakshina (2017) and became well known for portraying the female lead Mithai and her lookalike Mithi in Mithai (2021).

She made her film debut with Avijit Sen's Pradhan (2023) portraying the female lead Rumi Pradhan opposite Dev. The film became one of the major successes of the year while Kundu's performance, screen presence and chemistry with her co-stars were well-received. Subsequently, she received her first Filmfare Awards Bangla nomination for Best Female Debut for the film. In January 2025, Kundu was appointed as the brand ambassador for ABP Ananda and ABP Onestop Weddings.

== Early life and education ==
Kundu was born on 24 February 2000 in Barasat, North 24 Parganas in West Bengal. She did her higher secondary in Humanities and completed her education from Barasat Girls' High School. She took admission in St. Paul's Cathedral Mission College for her Bachelor's degree in English, but couldn't complete her course owing to her work pressure. Her family members also suggested her to focus on either studies or acting; and she chose the latter, following her passion. Later, she completed her graduation in English language from Netaji Subhas Open University.

== Media ==
A single child, she mentioned in an interview that she shares a close relationship with her family and credited her parents for giving her confidence and encouraging her professionally. She has mentioned in an interview that sketching, singing and dancing as her occasional habits. She named Sridevi as her acting inspiration. Popular in the media; her looks, personality, fashion and artistry have received considerable public attention. She is quite active on her social profiles and regularly interacts with her fans and followers. She is a Lord Krishna devotee and visited Vrindavan to mark her 23rd birthday.

== Career ==
Kundu started her career with the television series E Amar Gurudakshina in 2017. She has also featured in a number of shows like Jai Kali Kalkattawali, Aloukik Na Loukik and Gopal Bhar. She got her breakthrough as a lead in Kone Bou in 2019. In January, 2021 she was cast and had started portraying the dual characters Mithai/Mithi in Mithai which wrapped up in June 2023.

Kundu made her film debut with Avijit Sen's Pradhan opposite Dev in 2023. Released on the occasion of Christmas vacations, the film became a major critical and commercial success, emerging as the second highest grossing Bengali film of 2023. Kundu portrayed the female lead Rumi Pradhan and received praise for her performance, screen presence and chemistry with her co-stars. She was further nominated for the 7th Filmfare Awards Bangla in the Best Female Debut category for the film. Kundu made her OTT debut in 2024, playing the lead role in the Ayan Chakraborti directorial murder-mystery drama series Kaalratri on Hoichoi. In 2025, she played the female lead in Rupak Chakraborty's thriller drama film 10e June opposite Sourav Das.

== Filmography ==
Year	Film	Role	Director	Notes	Ref.
2023	Pradhan	Rumi Pradhan	Avijit Sen	Debut film	
2025	10e June	Mitali	Rupak Chakraborty		

== Web series ==
2026	Atonko	purba	sumon das	Hoichoi tv+	psyicological thriller.	Notes	Ref.			
2024	Kaalratri	purba	sumon das	Hoichoi tv+	psyicological thriller.	Debi	Ayan Chakraborti	Hoichoi	Murder-mystery thriller	Web series debut
2026	Kaalratri 2	purba	sumon das	Hoichoi tv+	psyicological thriller.	Debi	Ayan Chakraborti	Hoichoi	Murder-mystery thriller	

2026 atonko

== Television ==
Year	Title	Role	Language	Channel	Notes	Production company(s)	Ref
2016– 2018	E Amar Gurudakshina	Jhilly	Bengali	Colors Bangla	Main Antagonist	Subrata Roy Productions	
2017– 2019	Jai Kali Kalkattawali	Raka	Bengali	Star Jalsha	Episodic role	Shree Venkatesh Films	
2017– 2018	Gopal Bhar	Jahnavi	Bengali	Star Jalsha	Supporting role	Shree Venkatesh Films	
2019	Aloukik Na Loukik	Putul	Bengali	Star Jalsha	Episodic Role	Raj Chakraborty Productions	
2019– 2020	Kone Bou	Koli Sen	Bengali	Sun Bangla	Lead role	Blues Productions	
2021–2023	Mithai	Mithai Modak/Mithi Biswas	Bengali	Zee Bangla	Lead role	Zee Bangla Productions	

=== Special appearances ===
Year	Serial	Channel	Role	Character	Reference
2021	Dadagiri Unlimited Season 9	Zee Bangla	Participant	Mithai	
2021	Rannaghor	Zee Bangla	Guest	Herself	
2022	Dadagiri Unlimited Season 9 Grand Finale	Zee Bangla	Guest	Herself	
2022	Didi No. 1 Season 9	Zee Bangla	Participant	Mithai	

=== Mahalaya ===
Year	Program	Channel	Role	Reference
2021	Nana Roope Mahamaya	Zee Bangla	Devi Kamalekamini	
2022	Singhobahini Trinayani	Zee Bangla	Devi Jayadurga	

== Awards ==
Year	Award	Category	Name
2022	Zee Bangla Sonar Sansar 2022	Sera Nayika	Mithai
2022	Zee Bangla Sonar Sansar 2022	Priyo Bouma	Mithai
2022	Zee Bangla Sonar Sansar 2022	Priyo Juti(with Adrit Roy)	Mithai
2022	West Bengal Tele Academy Awards	Best Actress	Mithai
2023	Zee Bangla Sonar Sansar 2023	Sera Nayika	Mithai
2023	Zee Bangla Sonar Sansar 2023	Zee 5 Popular Face	Mithai
2023	TV 9 Bangla Ghorer Bioscope Award 2023	Best Actress Television	Mithai
2024	Bochorer Sera Award	Best Actress	Mithai
2024	Telly Cine Awards	Best Debutant Female	Pradhan
2025	Anandalok Puraskar 2025	Best Actress OTT	Kalratri
