= 21 July Martyr's Day =

Annual mass rally in West Bengal, India

Martyr's Day
- Observed by: Indian National Congress; Trinamool Congress
- Celebrations: Rallies
- Date: 21 July
- Next time: 21 July 2026
- Frequency: Annual
- Related to: 1993 Kolkata firing

The 21 July Martyr's Day is an annual event held by the Indian National Congress and the Trinamool Congress on 21 July every year in Kolkata. It originated as the 1993 Kolkata Writers' Building March was a protest organised by Mamata Banerjee, then a leader of the Indian National Congress (I), on 21 July 1993, to demand the introduction of mandatory photo voter ID cards in elections. The protest aimed to potentially destabilize the ruling Left Front government led by the Communist Party of India (Marxist). The protest, which led to violence and police firing, resulted in the deaths of 13 people and became a significant turning point in West Bengal's political history. After the main organizers of the 1993 rally broke away to form All India Trinamool Congress the mantle of the rally was taken by AITMC.

== Background ==
At the time, Mamata Banerjee was serving as the Minister of State for Human Resource Development in the P. V. Narasimha Rao government but had lost influence within the Indian National Congress after being defeated by Somen Mitra in the 1992 election for the party's youth wing president in West Bengal. Following the loss, Banerjee blamed the defeat on an internal conspiracy by the Somen Mitra faction and the Congress high command. Seeking to regain political momentum, she called for a march to the Writers' Building, the administrative headquarters of the West Bengal government, with the stated purpose of demanding the mandatory introduction of photo voter ID cards.

== The March ==
On July 21, 1993, thousands of Congress workers gathered in central Kolkata, covering areas from Bowbazar to Brabourne Road, and Mayo Road to Strand Road. The rally, which had taken over a large portion of the city, was marked by inflammatory speeches by Congress youth leaders, including Mrigen Banerjee and Satya Bapuli incited the crowd, urging them to break through police cordons and saying, "We're here to fight, not to act." They even threatened to assault senior Congress leaders. On Red Road, vandalism and arson broke out. Shops were closed, and in the chaos, Sergeant D.K. Ghosal of the Taltala Police Station was shot, S.I. Kalachand Samaddar's head was cracked open with an iron rod, and Constable Manas Nandi lost six teeth after being hit by a brick. PTI journalist Saeed Ahmed was severely injured. Among the attackers on Mayo Road, the police recovered two loaded pipe guns, a country-made revolver, 17 bombs, and six swords. Defying Section 144, the crowd even broke into the Press Club. Looting took place in New Market, club tents were attacked, and the SSKM hospital was also targeted. Three buses were burned, 35 cars were vandalized, and 215 police officers were injured.

== Police Action and Aftermath ==
To control the violence, the police initially used tear gas and baton charges. When this failed to disperse the crowd, they fired several rounds into the air as a warning. However, around 1:45 PM, police opened fire on the rioters, resulting in the deaths of 13 people. The incident marked a tragic turn in the protest. Mamata Banerjee, who had incited the protest, sought refuge in a police vehicle during the firing. She later visited injured protesters in the hospital. Other prominent Congress leaders, including Shovandeb Chattopadhyay and Sadhan Pande, also sought shelter in the Assembly or their cars. The firing and its aftermath left a deep impact on West Bengal politics.

== Controversies ==
The official reason for the protest was to demand mandatory voter ID cards, which was the responsibility of the Election Commission of India, not the state government. This raised questions about the true motive behind the march, with many speculating that it was part of an internal power struggle within the Congress party.

In a 2012 issue of Jago Bangla, former Trinamool Congress leader Sonali Guha revealed that there had been a secret plan among some protesters to block the then Chief Minister Jyoti Basu's car on Red Road by disguising themselves as Muslim women in burqas. The Congress party itself did not fully support the march, and senior leader Gani Khan Chowdhury on the next day itself met Basu at Banga Bhavan in New Delhi and assured of his support in maintaining law and order in the state. On August 2, Manish Gupta, then West Bengal's Home Secretary and now a minister in Mamata Banerjee's cabinet, reported to the Prime Minister's Office that “many armed criminals, intoxicated, had gathered that day.” Even the Union Home Minister, S.B. Chavan, after speaking with Jyoti Basu, found no need for a CBI or judicial inquiry.

== Investigations ==
Upon taking office as Chief Minister of West Bengal in 2011, Mamata Banerjee formed a commission to investigate the events of July 21, led by retired Justice Sushanta Chatterjee. The commission called several witnesses, including Buddhadeb Bhattacharjee and Biman Bose, but ultimately did not find any senior leaders of the Left Front or police officers responsible for the deaths. The commission's final report, submitted in December 2014, concluded that one of the 13 deceased had died from cirrhosis of the liver, likely due to excessive alcohol consumption, rather than from police gunfire.

== Legacy ==
The events of July 21, 1993, were a pivotal moment in Mamata Banerjee's rise to power. The protest and the deaths of the 13 individuals became a rallying point for her political career. Since coming to power, Banerjee has commemorated July 21 every year as Martyrs' Day in West Bengal. However, the designation of the 13 victims as "martyrs" has been controversial, as many were alleged to be armed and involved in violent clashes with the police. Critics argue that the events of the day were less about democratic protest and more about an internal struggle within the Congress party. The 1993 Writers' Building March remains a contentious chapter in West Bengal's political history. While Mamata Banerjee has used the event to consolidate her political influence, questions continue to be raised about the motives behind the protest and the events that led to the deaths of 13 individuals. The person who had authorized the police to shoot, Manish Gupta (former Home Secretary, Government of West Bengal) joined the Trinamool Congress and became a Minister in Mamata Banerjee's Cabinet.
