= Partha Sarathi Deb =

Indian actor (1955/1956–2024)

- পার্থসারথি দেব
- Born: 1955/56; Calcutta, West Bengal, India
- Died: 22 March 2024 (aged 68); Kolkata, West Bengal, India
- Occupation: Actor
- Years active: c. 1980s–2024
- Spouse: Vinita Dev Banerjee (div. 2018)
- Children: 1

Partha Sarathi Deb (Bengali: পার্থসারথি দেব; 1955/56 – 22 March 2024) was an Indian actor of Bengali film and television. He also acted in Telugu films.

== Early life and career ==
Deb was born in Kolkata. Throughout a career longer than forty years, Deb acted in over two hundred productions, including Raktabeej. He was the vice president of the West Bengal Motion Picture Artists Forum. Deb's credits include Ek Akasher Niche, Satyajiter Goppo, Sonar Kella, Mahaprithibi, Hridayer Katha, Joyee, Chuni Panna, Mithai, Prem Aamar, Kakababu Here Gelen?, Lathi and Bogla Mama Jug Jug Jiyo. Deb also acted in several Tollywood films. Having acted in Romeo, Deb was also due to dub in a number of upcoming films.

== Personal life and death ==
Deb was married to Vinita Dev Banerjee, with whom he had a daughter. The two later divorced in 2018. Deb was diagnosed with COVID-19 in 2021. He recovered but was diagnosed with COPD, which led to lung infection and pneumonia, and was admitted to the hospital on 9 February 2024, before being put into ventilation on 17 March and succumbing to the illness on 22 March 2024 in Kolkata. He was 68.

== Selected filmography ==
- Raktabeej
- Ek Akasher Niche
- Satyajiter Goppo
- Sonar Kella
- Mahaprithibi
- Hridayer Katha
- Joyee
- Chuni Panna
- Mithai
- Prem Aamar
- Kakababu Here Gelen?
- Lathi
- Bogla Mama Jug Jug Jiyo
- Romeo
- Chhoto Bokulpurer Jatri
