= Chaitali Chakrabarti =

Chaitali Chakrabarti from the Arizona State University, Tempe, Arizona, United States, was named Fellow of the Institute of Electrical and Electronics Engineers (IEEE) in 2012 "for contributions to low power embedded system design and to very large scale integration architectures for signal processing".
