= Ankush Hazra =

Indian actor

- Born: 14 February 1989 (age 37); Bardhaman, West Bengal, India
- Occupations: Actor; dancer; host; producer; television personality
- Years active: 2010–present
- Known for: Kellafate; Khiladi; Kanamachi; Kelor Kirti; Jamai 420; Bolo Dugga Maiki; Bibaho Obhijaan; Abar Bibaho Obhijaan; Zulfiqar; Mirza: Part 1 – Joker
- Awards: See Awards and nominations

Ankush Hazra (born 14 February 1989) is an Indian actor, dancer and television anchor who primarily works in Bengali cinema. Known for his portrayals of men often battling social norms. Having starred in over 26 films in his career, he has received several accolades including the Mahanayak Samman (2023), conferred upon by the Government of West Bengal.

Hazra's first film was Kellafate, an action comedy film directed by Pijush Saha. His main success came with the masala film Idiot (2012), through which he became one of the leading superstars of Bengali cinema. He received appraisals for his performance as a news reporter of Anandabazar Patrika in the political thriller Kanamachi (2013) directed by Raj Chakraborty, which marks the first collaboration between them. In 2014, he gained the huge following with the film Ami Shudhu Cheyechi Tomay (2014), an Indo-Bangla joint venture which was the biggest hit in his career at that point of time. Later his performance was also praised as a rising don in the multistarrer action thriller Zulfiqar (2016) directed by Srijit Mukherji, which emerged as the highest grossing Bengali film (A-rated) of 2016. He launched the film production house Ankush Hazra Motion Pictures on 15 August 2022. Since January 2022, he is serving as the Joint Secretary of the "West Bengal Motion Picture Artists' Forum" along with fellow actor Diganta Bagchi.

== Acting career ==
=== 2010-2020 ===
Hazra caught the attention of film director Pijus Saha who starred him in his romantic comedy film Kellafate of Banner-Prince Entertainment P4. This film was also produced by Saha. Hazra was paired opposite newcomer Rupashree.

Later, Hazra starred in the Bengali romantic drama film Idiot of Eskay Movies, directed by Rajib Biswas. He returned with his next Bengali film Kanamachi. His next film was Ki Kore Toke Bolbo. Bibaho Obhijaan released on 21 June 2019.

=== 2021-present ===
He did two promotional short films named Illusion and Enter View for the film Magic. His next film was the crime thriller FIR. He then had a guest appearance in Kishmish, Biye Bibhrat and Raktabeej. His film Savings Account released on ZEE5. After working in films like Savings Account (2022), Ogo Bideshini (2022), Uttwaraan (2022) and Bhoy (2023), he appeared in romantic comedy films like Abar Bibaho Obhijaan (2023) and Love Marriage (2023). His next film Kurban marked the 25th film of his career. In 2024, he played the titular role in the action thriller film Mirza: Part 1 - Joker. It also marked his debut as a producer.

== Personal life ==
Hazra was born on 14 February in Bardhaman, West Bengal. He completed his education from Holy Rock School and East West Model School. He did B.B.A. from Heritage Academy. As of July 2020, Hazra is in a relationship with fellow actress Oindrila Sen.

== Filmography ==
=== As actor ===
†	Denotes films that have not yet been released

Year	Film	Role	Notes	Ref.
2010	Kellafate	Shibu	Debut Film	
2012	Idiot	Samrat		
2013	Kanamachi	Abir		
2013	Khiladi	Suleman / Krishna		
2014	Ami Shudhu Cheyechi Tomay	Abhijeet	Indo-Bangladesh joint venture	
2015	Romeo vs Juliet	Romeo	Indo-Bangladesh joint venture	
2015	Aashiqui	Rahul	Indo-Bangladesh joint venture	
2015	Jamai 420	Joy		
2016	Ki Kore Toke Bolbo	Akash		
2016	Kelor Kirti	Apurbo		
2016	Zulfiqar	Akhtar Ahmed		
2016	Haripada Bandwala	Haripada		
2017	Ami Je Ke Tomar	Aditya		
2017	Bolo Dugga Maiki	Sammyo		
2018	Villain	Joy / Raja		
2019	Bibaho Obhijaan	Anupam		
2021	Magic	Indrajit		
2021	F.I.R No. 339/07/06	ACP Abhrajit Dutta		
2022	Savings Account	Abhimanyu Sen	Released on ZEE5	
2022	Ogo Bideshini	AB "Anath Bondhu"		
2022	Uttwaraan	Rudra Mallik	Released on ZEE5	
2023	Bhoy	Ayan Roy	Released on ZEE5	
2023	Love Marriage	Dipanjan Sanyal/Dipu/Bokai		
2023	Abar Bibaho Obhijaan	Anupam		
2023	Kurban	Hasan	25th Film	
2024	Mirza: Part 1 – Joker	Mirza	Debut as Producer	
2025	Chandrobindoo	Arnab Martin		
2025	Raktabeej 2	Dr. Sahil Choudhury / Munir Alam		
2026	Nari Choritro Bejay Jotil	Jhantu		
2027	Mon Kharap †	TBA		
2027	Santa †	TBA		

=== Guest Appearance ===
†	Denotes films that have not yet been released

Year	Film	Role	Director	Notes	Ref.
2022	Kishmish	Himself	Rahul Mukherjee	Special Appearance	
2023	Biye Bibhrat	Himself	Raja Chanda	Special Appearance	
2023	Raktabeej	Munir Alam	Shiboprosad Mukherjee & Nandita Roy	Special Appearance	
2025	Omorshongi	Himself	Dibya Chatterjee	Special Appearance	
2025	Killbill Society	Himself	Srijit Mukherji	Special Appearance	

=== Television ===
Year	Show	Role	Channel
2016	Dance Bangla Dance	(Season 9) Judge	Zee Bangla
2017	Didi No. 1	(Season 7) Guest	Zee Bangla
2018	Dance Bangla Dance	(Season 10) Judge	Zee Bangla
2021	Didi No. 1	(Season 8) Guest	Zee Bangla
2020-2021	Hasiwala & Company	(Season 1) Judge	Star Jalsha
2020-2021	Dance Dance Junior	(Season 2) Guest Judge	Star Jalsha
2021	Dance Bangla Dance	(Season 11) Host	Zee Bangla
2021	Dadagiri	Guest	Zee Bangla
2022	Mon Phagun	Guest appearances	Star Jalsha
2023	Mithai	Guest Appearance	Zee Bangla
2023	Dance Bangla Dance	(Season 12) Host	Zee Bangla
2024	Kolkata Comedy Kettan	Guest Judge	Bongo Byango
2025	Dance Bangla Dance	(season 13) Judge	Zee Bangla

=== Web series ===
†	Denotes webseries that have not yet been released

Year	Web Series	Role	Director	Platform
2020	Case Jaundice	Mr. Das	Subhankar Chattopadhyay	Hoichoi
2023	Shikarpur	Keshto	Nirjhar Mitra	ZEE5

== Awards and nominations ==
Year	Award	Category	Film	Result
2017	IBFA Awards	Best Jodi (Ankush and Nusrat Jahan)	Haripada Bandwala	Won
2020	Films and Frames Digital Film Awards	Best Actor (Comic Role)	Bibaho Obhijaan	Won
2023	Mahanayak Samman	—N/a	—N/a	Won
