= Aritra Dutta Banik =

Bengali film actor

- Born: 10 November 1999 (age 26); Sodepur, North 24 Parganas, West Bengal
- Education: Jadavpur University
- Occupations: Actor, Film Editor, Colourist, Legal Researcher

Aritra Dutta Banik (Bengali: অরিত্র দত্ত বণিক) is a Bengali film actor who has made several on-screen appearances since 2003. He made his debut in the Bengali megaserial Tithir Atithi, which was aired on ETV Bangla from 2003 to 2009. He drew public attention for the first time during Mithun Chakraborty's dance reality show, Dance Bangla Dance Junior (2007), in which, he anchored the show along with Tathoi Deb. Since then, he has appeared in numerous Bengali films.

== Career ==
Aritra made his first appearance with the Bengali megaserial Tithir Atithi which was aired on ETV Bangla from 2003 to 2009. He gained publicity for the first time as he anchored the show Dance Bangla Dance Junior in Zee Bangla in 2007. After that, he got a chance to act in the 2008 Bengali movie Chirodini Tumi Je Amar along with actors Rahul Banerjee and Priyanka Sarkar. It was his first silver screen appearance. Since then, he has been cast in a number of Bengali films. He has also featured in a lot of television serials and reality shows.

== Filmography ==
Aritra has appeared in the following Bengali films since 2008.

Year	Film	Role	Director	Language	Notes
2006	Kranti	Little jeet	Riingo Banerjee	Bengali	Debut film
2008	Chirodini Tumi Je Amar	Pancha, works at Garage with Krishna	Raj Chakraborty	Bengali	
2009	Paran Jai Jaliya Re	Raj's cousin, Chote Mian	Rabi Kinagi	Bengali	
2009	Challenge	Boy in Tea Stall	Raj Chakraborty	Bengali	
2010	Handa and Bhonda	Sayan	Subhankar Chattopadhyay	Bengali	
2010	Wanted		Rabi Kinagi	Bengali	
2010	Le Chakka	Special Appearance	Raj Chakraborty	Bengali	
2011	Hello Memsaheb	Tinga	Nandita Roy, Shiboprosad Mukherjee	Bengali	
2012	Idiot	Himself	Ashok Pati	Bengali	
2012	Khokababu	Circuit	Shankar Aiyya	Bengali	
2012	Le Halua Le	Boy in Tea Stall	Raja Chanda	Bengali	
2013	Loveria	Bablu	Raja Chanda	Bengali	
2013	Kanamachi		Raj Chakraborty	Bengali	
2013	Khiladi (2013 film)	Nitai	Ashok Pati	Bengali	
2019	Teko (film)		Abhimanyu Mukherjee	Bengali	
2023	Borfi		Souvik Dey	Bengali	

== Television ==
Year	Serial/Show	Role	Channel	Notes
2003 - 2009	Tithir Atithi		ETV Bangla	First appearance
2007	Dance Bangla Dance Junior	Himself	Zee Bangla	Anchor
2008	Sukh - Thikana Baikunthapur		Zee Bangla	
2009	Dadagiri Unlimited	Himself	Zee Bangla	Contestant
2009	Ei Ghar Ei Sangsar		Zee Bangla	
2013	Jhalak Dikhla Jaa	Himself	ETV Bangla	Contestant
2016	Dugga Dugga		Star Jalsa	
2022	Crash Course		Amazon Prime Video	
