= Bibaho Obhijaan =

2019 Indian Bengali-language comedy drama film

- Theatrical release poster
- Directed by: Birsa Dasgupta
- Written by: Rudranil Ghosh
- Screenplay by: Rudranil Ghosh
- Produced by: Shrikant Mohta; Mahendra Soni
- Starring: Ankush Hazra; Nusrat Faria; Rudranil Ghosh; Sohini Sarkar; Anirban Bhattacharya; Priyanka Sarkar
- Cinematography: Shuvankar Bhar
- Edited by: Md. Kalam
- Music by: Jeet Gannguli
- Production company: Shree Venkatesh Films
- Distributed by: Shree Venkatesh Films
- Release date: 21 June 2019
- Country: India
- Language: Bengali

Bibaho Obhijaan lit. 'The Adventures of Marriage' (transl. Marital Adventure) is an Indian Bengali-language comedy drama film directed by Birsa Dasgupta and produced by Shrikant Mohta and Mahendra Soni. The film stars Ankush Hazra and Bangladeshi actress Nusraat Faria in lead roles, and Priyanka Sarkar, Rudranil Ghosh, Anirban Bhattacharya and Sohini Sarkar in supporting roles. This film was released on 21 June 2019 under the banner of Shree Venkatesh Films. The music direction of the movie was made by Jeet Gannguli. A standalone sequel named Abar Bibaho Obhijaan was released on 25 May 2023.

== Plot ==
Two close friends Anupam and Rajat decide to marry. Rajat marries Maya who is always busy in performing religious rituals or watching trash tele serials whereas Anupam marries Rai, a women's activist and social worker. Later, they become frustrated with their married life. So both of them decided to travel to Darjeeling via Tarapith for getting some peace by lie to their respective wives they are on business trip to Puri. On their road journey their bus gets hijacked by dacoits named Bullet Singh whose real name is Ganesh Maity, a village boy, loves village girl Malati but cannot express his feelings. In an attempt to impress her, he turns into a dacoit named Bullet Singh. Anupam and Rajat somehow manage to escape from Bullet but end up landing in a brothel where police suddenly raid the area and mistake them as prostitutes, and this time also they manage to escape but end up returning to Bullet Singh, who later explain his love for Malti. Their respective wives get to know their whereabouts and come to bring them back disguised as reporters. After much comical situation Anupam screams in anger, and he reveals that he wants some peace in his life as both of them are very frustrated. After hearing their husbands' story both the wives realise how badly they have controlled and irritated them, at last they apologise to each other and travel on a road trip. Meanwhile Bullet Singh also gets arrested but with Malti who has decided to stay with him in prison.

== Cast ==
- Ankush Hazra as Anupam Banerjee
- Nusrat Faria as Rai
- Rudranil Ghosh as Rajat
- Sohini Sarkar as Maya
- Anirban Bhattacharya as Ganesh Maity aka Gonsha aka Bullet Singh
- Priyanka Sarkar as Malati
- Ambarish Bhattacharya as Police inspector
- Sandy Saha as Sona
- Rupsha Guha as Ranja
- Manasi Sengupta
- Nabanita Mazumder
- Debapratim Dasgupta
- Arijita Mukhopadhyay
- Mallika Banerjee
- Sanghasri Sinngha Mitra
- Puja Banerjee in a guest appearance in the item number "Michhrir Dana"

== Soundtrack ==
Bibaho Obhijaan

Soundtrack album by Jeet Gannguli
- Released: 12 June 2019
- Recorded: 2018
- Studio: Shree Venkatesh Films
- Genre: Feature film soundtrack
- Label: Shree Venkatesh Films
- Producers: Shrikant Mohta; Mahendra Soni

Jeet Gannguli chronology
Kidnap (2019)	Bibaho Obhijaan (2019)	ACP Rudra On Duty (2019)

Singles from Bibaho Obhijaan
- 1. "Bibaho Obhijaan (Title Track)" Released: 5 June 2019; 2. "Michhrir Dana" Released: 12 June 2019

All lyrics are written by Srijato; all music is composed by Jeet Gannguli.

Track list
No.	Title	Singer	Length
1.	"Bibaho Obhijaan (Title Track)"	Debraj Bhattacharya, Anirban Bhattacharya	3:24
2.	"Michhrir Dana"	Shreya Ghoshal, Jeet Gannguli	3:33

== Release ==
The film was theatrically released on 21 June 2019.

== Reception ==
=== Critical reception ===
The film received mixed response from critics who praised the acting performance of Anirban Bhattacharya but criticised the direction and plot. In The Times of India, Srijoy Mukherjee wrote "Bibaho Obhijaan is a fun and light-hearted romp", but also criticised it saying "the humour is shallow and picks on easy targets".

In Firstpost, Bhaskar Chattopadhyay called this film "An irredeemable offering despite some rare laugh-out-loud moments", stating "Unfortunately, for most of its two-hour duration, Bibaho Obhijaan is simply not funny enough". But he also praised Anirban Bhattacharya's acting stating "There would not be an ounce of exaggeration to say that if he would not have been in the film, the film would have fared very, very poorly. The young actor single-handedly saves the film from sinking and is clearly its biggest star".

== Awards ==
- West Bengal Film Journalists' Association Awards for Best Performance in a Comic Role - Anirban Bhattacharya (Won) for Bibaho Obhijaan
- Kalkar Awards 2020 in a Best Actor (Male) Ankush Hazra for Bibaho Obhijaan
- Films and Frames Digital Film Awards 2020 in a Best Actor (Comic Role) Ankush Hazra for Bibaho Obhijaan

== Sequel ==
Following its success a sequel named Abar Bibaho Obhijaan was released in 2023.
