= Chirodini Tumi Je Amar =

Chirodini... Tumi Je Amar
- Official Theatrical Poster of Chirodini Tumi Je Amar
- Directed by: Raj Chakraborty
- Screenplay by: N. K. Salil
- Story by: Balaji Shaktivel
- Produced by: Shree Venkatesh Films
- Starring: Rahul Banerjee; Priyanka Sarkar; Tamal Roy Chowdhury; Gita Dey; Sujit Dutta; Rudranil Ghosh; Rita Koiral; Supriyo Dutta; Tina Datta
- Cinematography: Premendu Bikash Chaki
- Edited by: Raviranjan Maitra
- Music by: Jeet Gannguli
- Distributed by: Shree Venkatesh Films
- Release date: 15 August 2008
- Running time: 2 hours 14 min
- Country: India
- Language: Bengali

Chirodini ... Tumi Je Amar (English: You Are Mine Eternally), also known by the initialism CTJA is a 2008 Indian Bengali language romantic drama film directed by Raj Chakraborty, making his directional debut in Bengali cinema and produced by Shrikant Mohta under the banner of Shree Venkatesh Films. It is a remake of the 2004 Tamil film Kaadhal. The film stars Rahul Banerjee and Priyanka Sarkar (Note: Priyanka Sarkar made her cinematic debut with this film.) in the lead, while Rudranil Ghosh, Geeta Dey, Tamal Roychowdhury, Rita Koiral, Tulika Basu, Supriyo Dutta, Prasun Gain, Parthasarathi Chakraborty, Debranjan Nag, Pradip Dhar, Subhomoy Chatterjee and Pradip Bhattacharya played supporting roles.

Sabyasachi Chakraborty gave his voice in the film, playing the narrator and Dev made a cameo appearance in the song "Pante Taali". The soundtrack of the film was composed by Jeet Gannguli, while the screenplay and dialogues were by N.K Salil. It plots a tragic love story between a 18 years old student Pallabi and a two-wheeler mechanic Krishna from Siliguri. Escaping from her home, she goes to Kolkata with Krishna and gets married off. But Pallavi's family tracks them and brings them to Siliguri and all on a sudden brutally hits Krishna. After a long time, fate reunites them, where Pallavi is married with another man, having a child and Krishna has already gone mad due to his brain injury.

The name of the film was taken from the song of the same name composed by Bappi Lahiri and sung by Kishore Kumar, from the Prosenjit Chatterjee star blockbuster film Amar Sangi (1987). After a long time, CTJA brought the trend of teen-age films in Bengali cinema and started a new era. Considered to be an all time blockbuster at the box office, it completed a 25 week long run in theatres and also eventually established Raj Chakraborty as a leading filmmaker in the industry.

== Plot ==
Krishna (Rahul Banerjee) is a diligent scooter mechanic in Siliguri and life goes on hectic yet smoothly for him until a daughter of rich local mafia don Pallavi (Priyanka Sarkar) sets her eyes on him. The infatuation reaches dangerous levels when she coaxes Krishna to take her away from the clutches of her family, which has other plans about her future. The film begins with the elopement, as Pallavi steps out of her house in her school uniform, leaving even her wristwatch behind since Krishna has instructed her not to take a single thing with her. The two rush into a shopping mall where Pallavi hurriedly changes into a boy's shirt, pants and cap, leaves her uniform behind, and the two board the bus and leave for kolkata.

The flashback, as point-of-view narrations between Pallavi and Krishna, are intercut with Pallavi's don-like father and uncle terrorizing the neighbourhood and the school in search of the truant girl and after interrogating Pallavi's friend they came to learn that Pallavi has fled with Krishna leaving Pallavi's father and uncle furious. Krishna hesitantly yields to her charm and the two run away to Kolkata. Krishna's friend Ali (Rudranil Ghosh) and his group at Kolkata helps them, and the lovers marry. The couple consummates their union while the mess chaps hastily organize a proper wedding and elaborate reception.They finally find a place to stay since they now are a married couple and hence are convinced that they'll life a happy life from now onwards.

Pallavi's uncle using his wit and with the help of Ali who is unaware of his intentions tracks down the couple and offers to come back and reconcile with the family. An emotional Pallavi convinced by her uncle prepares to leave towards Siliguri with Krishna who however was quite suspicious of Pallavi's uncle's sympathetic behaviour. On the way Krishna and Pallavi realize that they have been tricked and Pallavi's uncle completely furious on Krishna starts venting out his anger on both of them. Krishna gets dragged out and gets severely beaten by her father's goons leaving him insane. Pallavi agrees to marry another man to save Krishna's life and loses sense. Krishna took one broken bangle of Pallavi's hand and leaves that place crumbling. While she believes this decision is best and moves on with her life.

A couple of years pass away and Pallavi has completely forgotten Krishna and is happily married to another man and has a baby with him. One day, along with her husband and baby, she comes across a crazy man on the streets. Pallavi soon realizes that the insane man is none other than Krishna as she spots her name on his chest which he had carved as a sign of love all those years ago. Krishna had lost his memory and sanity from the grievous assault at the hands of Pallavi's father and relatives which resulted into the permanent damage of his brain. She slips into a complete state of shock as she witnesses Krishna's pitiable condition. She tries to revive his memory and bring him back to his senses. However, Krishna's condition had reached the worst phase and he doesn't recognize her even after her constant persuasion. He leaves her and walks away leaving Pallavi in utter sorrow and guilt as she blames herself for Krishna's tragedy.

== Cast ==
- Rahul Banerjee as Krishna, a two-wheeler mechanic
- Priyanka Sarkar as Pallabi Mukherjee, a student
- Rudranil Ghosh as Ali, Krishna's Friend
- Tina Datta as Priyanka, Pallabi's Friend
- Mousumi Mitra as Pallabi's school teacher
- Tamal Roy Chowdhury as Pallabi's Father
- Rita Koiral as Pallabi's Mother
- Tulika Basu as Pallabi's Aunt
- Supriyo Dutta as Pallabi's Uncle
- Diya Mukherjee as Pallabi's friend
- Aritra Dutta Banik as 'Phootkorai' Pocha, helper mechanic of Krishna
- Gita Dey as Pallabi's Grand Mother
- Subhomoy Chatterjee as Mrinal Da, Ali's room partner
- Prasun Gain as Tarun, Ali's friend
- Partha Sarathi Chakraborty as Kanu, Ali's friend
- Debranjan Nag as Habul, Ali's friend

=== Special appearances ===
- Raj Chakraborty as himself
- Dev as the item boy in the song 'Pante Taali'

== Soundtrack ==
Chirodini Tumi Je Amar

Studio album by Jeet Gannguli
- Released: 15 August 2008 (CD release)
- Recorded: 2007
- Studio: Shree Venkatesh Films
- Genre: Feature film soundtrack
- Language: Bengali
- Label: SVF
- Producer: SVF

Jeet Gannguli chronology
Love (2008)	Chirodini Tumi Je Amar (2008)	Bor Asbe Ekhuni (2008)

Professional ratings
Review scores
Source	Rating
NDTV Music	link

The soundtrack of CTJA was composed by Jeet Gannguli, with lyrics written by Priyo Chattopdhyay. The soundtrack was at the number one spot on the music charts for several consecutive weeks. The media partner of CTJA is Bengali music channel Sangeet Bangla.

No.	Title	Lyrics	Music	Singer(s)	Length
1.	"U La La (Female)"	Priyo Chattopadhyay	Jeet Gannguli	June Banerjee	2:18
2.	"Batashey Gungun"	Priyo Chattopadhyay	Jeet Gannguli	June Banerjee; Jeet Gannguli	5:00
3.	"Piya Re Piya Re"	Priyo Chattopadhyay	Jeet Gannguli	Zubeen Garg	2:14
4.	"Jhiri Jhiri"	Priyo Chattopadhyay	Jeet Gannguli	June Banerjee	3:24
5.	"Pante Taali"	Priyo Chattopadhyay	Jeet Gannguli	Jeet Gannguli and Chorus	3:51
6.	"U La La (Male)"	Priyo Chattopadhyay	Jeet Gannguli	Jeet Gannguli	4:10
Total length:					20:57

== Box office and ratings ==
Mahendra Soni of Shree Venkatesh Films spent ₹1 crore on making the movie and they have earned about ₹2 crore. Chirodini released with 40 prints and Venkatesh is coming up with some more.

== Reviews and critiques ==
The Telegraph reviewed that movie: "Chirodini... Tumi Je Aamar could as well be a version of QSQT or any other tragic teen love story done to death on screen. But Raj Chakraborty's directorial debut turns the cliche on its head and makes a two-hour-20-minute entertainer, without the tackiness, sloppiness and meaningless melodrama typical of mainstream Tollywood ... Chirodini's strength is its screenplay — smart, crisp and racy with neat shot divisions, life-like situations and convincing characters."

Screenindia.com comments that "The script begins to falter after the diabolic uncle takes the couple away, but till then it is smooth-sailing. Priyanka and Rahul offer the freshness Bengali cinema was dying to get for many years. They are young, absolutely new and have tried to do as much justice to the script as they could though the script backs Priyanka more than Rahul. The original touch is that the film opens with the couple's elopement after top-angle shots of the city of Kolkata panning across to cover people going about their daily lives including a madman who roams aimlessly across the streets. The love affair in the first half is a bit repetitive and the scenes in the girl's home are superfluous."

"Preetam Choudhury's production design is mind-blowing and realistic. Jeet's music ably complemented with Gautam-Susmit's lyrics blend into the theme and story of the film very well. Premendu Bikash Chaki's cinematography is brilliant in the second half but not so good in the first. This is a good debut where the footage is too long and the dream scenes stick out like sore thumbs. Raj has also made Priyanka prance around in a towel but it does not look vulgar. A good debut by a young director. One only hopes he can sustain the standard he has established with his first film. The film deserves one star for production design, one star for acting and one for the cinematography."

== Sequel ==
Chirodini ... Tumi Je Aamar 2 was released in 2014.
