= Tathoi Deb =

Indian actress, dancer and television presenter

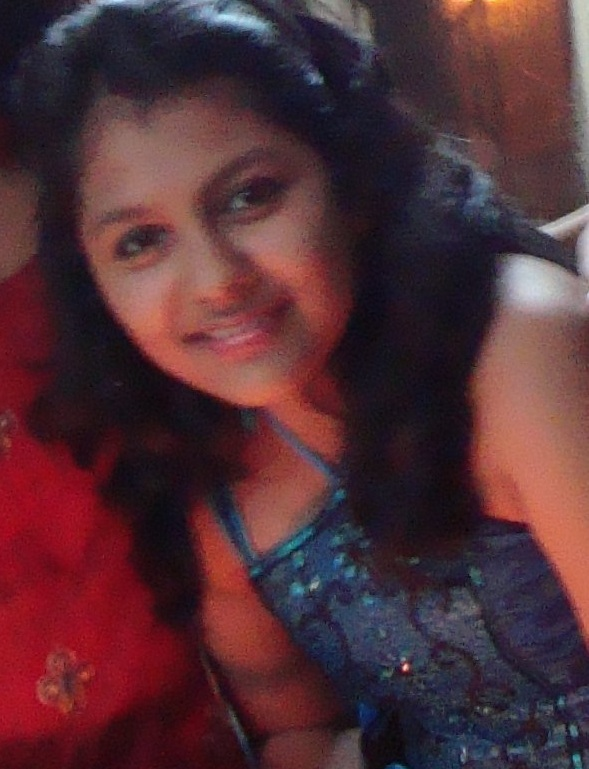
- Tathoi Deb
- Born: Sharanya Deb; Kolkata, West Bengal, India
- Education: National Gems Higher Secondary School
- Occupation: Actress
- Years active: 2005–present

Tathoi Deb (born Sharanya Deb) is an Indian actress, dancer and television presenter. She is one of the most popular former child actresses in Bengali cinema.

== Biography ==
Tathoi was born in Kolkata, West Bengal to Late Lala Biswajit Deb and Jamuna Deb. She has lost her father at an early age, so she lives with her mother. She has two older brothers Biswarup & Biswaraj. She attended National Gems Higher Secondary School.

== Career ==
Tathoi Deb's first job at TV was hosting the junior version of Bengali television dance reality show Dance Bangla Dance on Zee Bangla together with Aritra. Veteran Bengali actor Mithun Chakraborty was the judge of the show, which was broadcast for two seasons and made her a household name. She has won the highest television award in Bengali channels: a Telesamman Award for her presenting in this show. Tathoi, Aritra and Mithun Chakraborty had also presented a new dance show titled Dhoom Dhamaka which contains both junior and senior contestants.

She received the coveted Sanjukta Panigrahi Award for her dancing at the age of 8 and was also awarded the Amazing Kid Entertainer award at the Pogo Amazing Kids Awards (PAKA) 2008. She received the award from Bollywood actress Deepika Padukone. Tathoi has also performed versatile roles in various Bengali movies and telefilms. In Neel Rajar Deshe by Riingo she was the female lead. Tathoi is a trained Odissi dancer and have been trained by Dona Ganguly, the wife of Former Indian cricket team captain Sourav Ganguly.

Tathoi has been part of National Award-winning film Shob Choritro Kalponik by Rituporno Ghosh where she played cameo of young Radhika (Bipasha Basu). Tathoi's performance in Chalo Paltai (2011) was praised by all and sundry. She won the Best Child Artist award from Reliance Big Bangla New Talent Awards in 2011 for her performance in Chalo Paltai. In January 2012, Tathoi starred in Khokababu, the second highest-grossing Tollywood film of the time. Khokababu is Tathoi's most successful film till date commercially. Tathoi's acting was appreciated by fans and critics in her last film Ek Phonta Bhalobasha opposite Indraneil Sengupta which released in July 2013.

Besides acting, she has endorsed several brands like Elite Footwear, Meghna Garments, Itsy Bitsy Biscuits, Hahnemann Food products.She has also hosted and acted in different TV shows since Dance Bangla Dance Junior. She returned to Dance Bangla Dance season 8 in 2014 as a celebrity participant and was the winner.

== Filmography ==
- Akai Aksho (2005)
- Deshodrohi (stuck/on hold)
- Priyotoma (2006)
- Agnipariksha (2006)
- Chander Bari (2007)
- Nawab Nandini (2007)
- Neel Rajar Deshe (2008)
- Aamar Pratigna (2008)
- Shibaji (2008)
- Sob Choritro Kalponik (2009)
- Prem Amar (2009)
- Chalo Paltai (2011)
- Khokababu (2012)
- Ek Fota Bhaalobasha (2013)

=== Other shows ===
- Dance Bangla Dance Junior
- Take a Break
- Dhoom Dhamaka
- Dhay Dhamaal
- Ek Poloke Ektu Dekha(Megaserial)
- Joto Hashi Toto Ranna

== Awards and nominations ==
=== Sambad Pratidin Telesamman ===
Winner

- 2008: Best Female Anchor (Dance Bangla Dance Junior)

=== POGO Amazing Kids Awards(PAKA) ===
Winner

- 2008: Best Entertainer

=== Big Bangla New Talent Awards ===
Winner

- 2011: Best Child Artist (Chalo Paltai)

=== Uttam Kala Ratna Award ===
Winner

- 2012

== See also ==
- Devdaan Bhowmik
- Aritra Dutta Banik
