= Dance Bangla Dance =

Indian reality television show

- Also known as: DBD
- Genre: Reality
- Directed by: Raj Chakraborty; Subhankar Chattopadhyay; Avijit Sen
- Country of origin: India
- Original language: Bengali
- No. of seasons: 13

Production
- Producer: Zee Bangla
- Production company: Zee Bangla Productions

Original release
- Network: Zee Bangla
- Release: 6 April 2007 – present

Related
- Dance India Dance; Dance Maharashtra Dance

Dance Bangla Dance is a Bengali reality show program, which airs in Zee Bangla. It was later remade in Hindi as Dance India Dance. It first started on 6 April 2007, following Dance India Dance by Mithun Chakraborty, who had been the show's host from the beginning.

This show has made national record in 2012 by Limca Book of Records for making 100 non-stop episodes in the sixth season.

According to a news article published in Anandabazar Patrika, Ananda Plus on 6 December 2013, the 2014 season would not be judged by Chakraborty. In December 2013, it was announced on fellow Zee Bangla show Dadagiri that Dev would be a judge on it in season 8. Other past judges have included Swastika Mukherjee and Ananya Chatterjee.

== Seasons ==
Season No.	Season	Host	Judges	Winners
1	Dance Bangla Dance 2007	Mir	Mithun Chakraborty (MahaGuru)	Subhaneeta
2	Dance Bangla Dance Junior 2007–2008	Aritra Dutta Banik, Tathoi Deb	Mithun Chakraborty (MahaGuru)	Adrit
3	Dance Bangla Dance Dhoom Dhamaka 2008	Aritra Dutta Banik, Ritwika	Mithun Chakraborty (MahaGuru)	Rubel Das – Akash Sharma
4	Dance Bangla Dance Challengers 2008–2009	Aritra Dutta Banik and others	Mithun Chakraborty (MahaGuru)	
5	Dance Bangla Dance 2009	Bittu and others	Mithun Chakraborty (MahaGuru)	Suparna Sarkar (2 times National Champion)
6	Dance Bangla Dance Junior 2010–2011 (Longest running season) (more than 125 episodes)	Oindrila Saha	Mithun Chakraborty (MahaGuru), June Malia, Arpita Pal, Jisshu Sengupta, Rachna Banerjee, Soham Chakraborty	All finalists were declared as winner for avoiding negative impact of reality shows on children
7	Dance Bangla Dance Junior 2012–2013	Dipanwita Kundu, Ghantu	Mithun Chakraborty (MahaGuru), Swastika Mukherjee, Ananya Chatterjee	All finalists were declared as winner for avoiding negative impact of reality shows on children
8	Dance Bangla Dance 2014(Normal participant + Celebrity)	Vicky	Dev (Main), Nusrat Jahan, Yogesh Patkar, Madhuboni Chatterjee, Malabika Sen	Ricky Tewary, Tathoi Deb
9	Dance Bangla Dance Junior 2016	Raktim, Raktima	Jisshu Sengupta, Srabanti Chatterjee, Ankush Hazra	All finalists were declared as winner for avoiding negative impact of reality shows on children
10	Dance Bangla Dance Junior 2018	Bilas, Shayree	Jisshu Sengupta, Srabanti Chatterjee, Ankush Hazra	All finalists were declared as winner for avoiding negative impact of reality shows on children
11	Dance Bangla Dance 2021	Ankush Hazra, Vikram Chatterjee	Govinda, Jeet, Subhashree Ganguly	1st : Arnab – Sukanya; 2nd : Gang Street Mafia; 3rd : Rishita Nandy
12	Dance Bangla Dance 2023	Ankush Hazra	Mithun Chakraborty (MahaGuru), Mouni Roy, Subhashree Ganguly, Srabanti Chatterjee, Puja Banerjee	Elder: Disha; Younger: Snehashrita, Suman, Rajanya; Champion of the Champions: Snehashrita, Rajanya
13	Dance Bangla Dance 2025	Humpty, Bhombol, Anumegha, Michri, Rajvi, Debasmita, Roddur	Mithun Chakraborty (MahaGuru), Jishu Sengupta, Subhashree Ganguly, Koushani Mukherjee, Ankush Hazra	Elder: Krittika Mukherjee; Younger: Riju – Raju, Aditya Karmakar (Joint Champions); Champion of the Champions: Aditya Karmakar

== Hosts and Grand Masters ==
The show was actually first hosted by Mir. Then, it had various child hosts since its beginning. In its Season 8 and Season 11 the show is hosted by seniors. In Season 11, actor Vikram Chatterjee and Ankush Hazra co hosted the show.

In its season 12 Mithun Chakraborty again returned as Mahaguru a.k.a. Grand Master.
