= Ki Kore Toke Bolbo =

- Theatrical release poster
- Directed by: Rabi Kinagi
- Written by: Rabi Kinagi
- Produced by: Shree Venkatesh Films
- Starring: Ankush Hazra; Mimi Chakraborty
- Cinematography: Kumud Verma
- Edited by: Md. Kalam
- Music by: Dev Sen
- Production company: Shree Venkatesh Films
- Distributed by: Shrikant Mohta
- Release date: 12 February 2016
- Country: India
- Language: Bengali

Ki Kore Toke Bolbo (transl. How do I tell you) is a 2016 Indian Bengali language romantic drama film directed by Rabi Kinnagi and produced by Shrikant Mohta. The first look poster of the film was released on 15 January 2016. This title was inspired by the song Ki Kore Toke Bolbo from the film Rangbaaz, sung by Arijit Singh. The film stars Ankush Hazra and Mimi Chakraborty. The actors Mimi and Ankush paired for the first time in this movie. The movie was a remake of 2007 Kannada movie Milana but the premise and the core story line had similarities with another Bengali movie which had been released four months before - Shudhu Tomari Jonyo. This was because Shudhu Tomari Jonyo was a remake of the 2013 Tamil movie Raja Rani which was an unofficial adaptation of the 2007 Kannada movie Milana.

== Plot ==
The movie starts in a police station where a police is beating a boy named Akash for loving a girl named Priya. Akash is released from the jail and the police officer says that Priya herself complains to the police officer. Akash goes to Priya's house to know the truth. Akash learns that Priya's marriage had been fixed with another man and this is why her father complains in the police station. Priya says that she hopes he would get a better wife. Akash is left heartbroken. His parents notice that and request to Akash marry. Akash calmly agrees and marries Anjali, the girl his parents choose for him. But Anjali wants divorce in their first night and Akash agrees. Akash and Anjali go to divorce office and the court gives them six months to set things right between them.

Akash then learns that Anjali loves a man named Vikram. But her father forces her to marry with Akash. One day Akash saves Anjali from local boys, who was teasing her in a harsh manner. Akash and Anjali goes to a mall and Anjali sees Vikram there. Akash then sacrifices his married life and try to trace Vikram through a fake lottery contest in his radio channel, to contact Vikram. Later Akash takes Anjali to Vikram and they become reunited. One day Vikram tells Anjali to attend the valentine's day party. Anjali finds Vikram drunk and Vikram says that he took 50 lakh rupees from her father for Anjali's marriage with Akash. Anjali left heartbroken. Later Akash saves Anjali from humiliation in that party. After returning home Anjali tried to commit suicide but Akash saves her in time. Also he encouraged her to pursue a dream of completing her MS degree from US and declare her as his Best Friend.

After all incidents, gradually Anjali starts to fall in love with Akash. But she did not able to gather courage to express her love to Akash. When Akash's parents come to meet them, they have to act in front of their parents to make them happy. Then also Anjali starts to love Akash's parents as she lost her mother since childhood and also had bitter relationship with her father. One day, his mother gets the divorce paper. Akash then tells the whole matter to his mother. After Akash's parents left, he thanked Anjali to act perfectly, but Anjali tried to say Akash that she did not act and all her activities with his parents was real as she started to love Akash and his family. Later Akash also called Anjali's father to their house and after understanding her faults, she confessed to her father and felt guilty of all wrong doings she had done with Akash.

When the six months given by the court is over they go to the court and they signed to the divorce paper. Anjali left heartbroken and she goes to airport with her father, asking Akash not to go with her to Airport. Divorce judge tells Akash that he and Anjali do not seem as other divorced couples, who don't even ready to see other again. After returning home Akash felt lonely and understands that he also loved Anjali. He rushed to the airport where Vikram and his henchmen come to beat Akash, but Akash fights with them. Then local Don comes to his rescue and hence paid back his dues, as once Akash helped his sister's marriage. Akash goes to airport and find Anjali there. Anjali tells him that she can't leave him and Akash also express his love. They become reunited. Akash gave a good news to Anjali, that he actually got a better wife than Priya. On the other hand he has to eat Bread-Jam made by Anjali for whole life.

== Cast ==
- Ankush Hazra as Akash
- Mimi Chakraborty as Anjali
- Shankar Chakraborty as Akash's father
- Bharat Kaul as Anjali's father
- Shantilal Mukherjee as a local don
- Kharaj Mukherjee as Akash's neighbour
- Biswajit Chakraborty
- Biswanath Basu as Biswanath Das, Divorce specialist
- Pathikrit Basu
- Supriyo Dutta as Police inspector
- Pradip Dhar
- Rajat Ganguly
- Reshmi Sen as Akash's mother
- Soghoshree Sinha
- Manasi Sinha
- Mousumi Saha
- Alivia Sarkar as Rupa
- Paran Bandopadhyay as Mr. Roy, in a guest appearance
- Chaitali Dasgupta in a guest appearance
- Sujoy as Bikram

== Soundtrack ==
Ki Kore Toke Bolbo

Soundtrack album by Dev Sen & Jeet Gannguli
- Released: 17 November 2017
- Recorded: 2015–2016
- Genre: Feature film soundtrack
- Language: Bengali
- Label: SVF
- Producers: Mahendra Soni, Shrikant Mohta

Singles from Ki Kore Toke Bolbo
- 1. "Awaara Dil" Released: 22 Jan 2016; 2. "Tor Motoi" Released: 31 Jan 2016; 3. "Ki Kore Toke Bolbo Title Track" Released: 6 Feb 2016; 4. "Ki Kore Bolbo Tomaye (Male Version)" Released: 15 Mar 2016

Jeet Gannguli chronology
Besh Korechi Prem Korechi (2015)	Ki Kore Toke Bolbo (2016)	Power (2016)

Dev Sen chronology
Jamai 420 (2015)	Ki Kore Toke Bolbo (2016)	Kelor Kirti (2016)

All lyrics are written by Prasen (Prasenjit Mukherjee); all music is composed by Dev Sen, Jeet Gannguli.

No.	Title	Music	Singer(s)	Length
1.	"Awaara Dil"	Dev Sen	Vicky A Khan & Madhuraa Bhattacharya	3:56
2.	"Tor Motoi"	Jeet Gannguli	Jeet Gannguli	4:51
3.	"Ki Kore Bolbo Tomay (Title Track)"	Jeet Gannguli	Papon, Palak Muchhal	2:50
4.	"Ki Kore Bolbo Tomay (Male)"	Jeet Gannguli	Papon	4:56
5.	"Ki Kore Bolbo Tomay (Female)"	Jeet Gannguli	Palak Muchhal	4:56
