= Abu Hena Rony =

Bangladeshi comedian

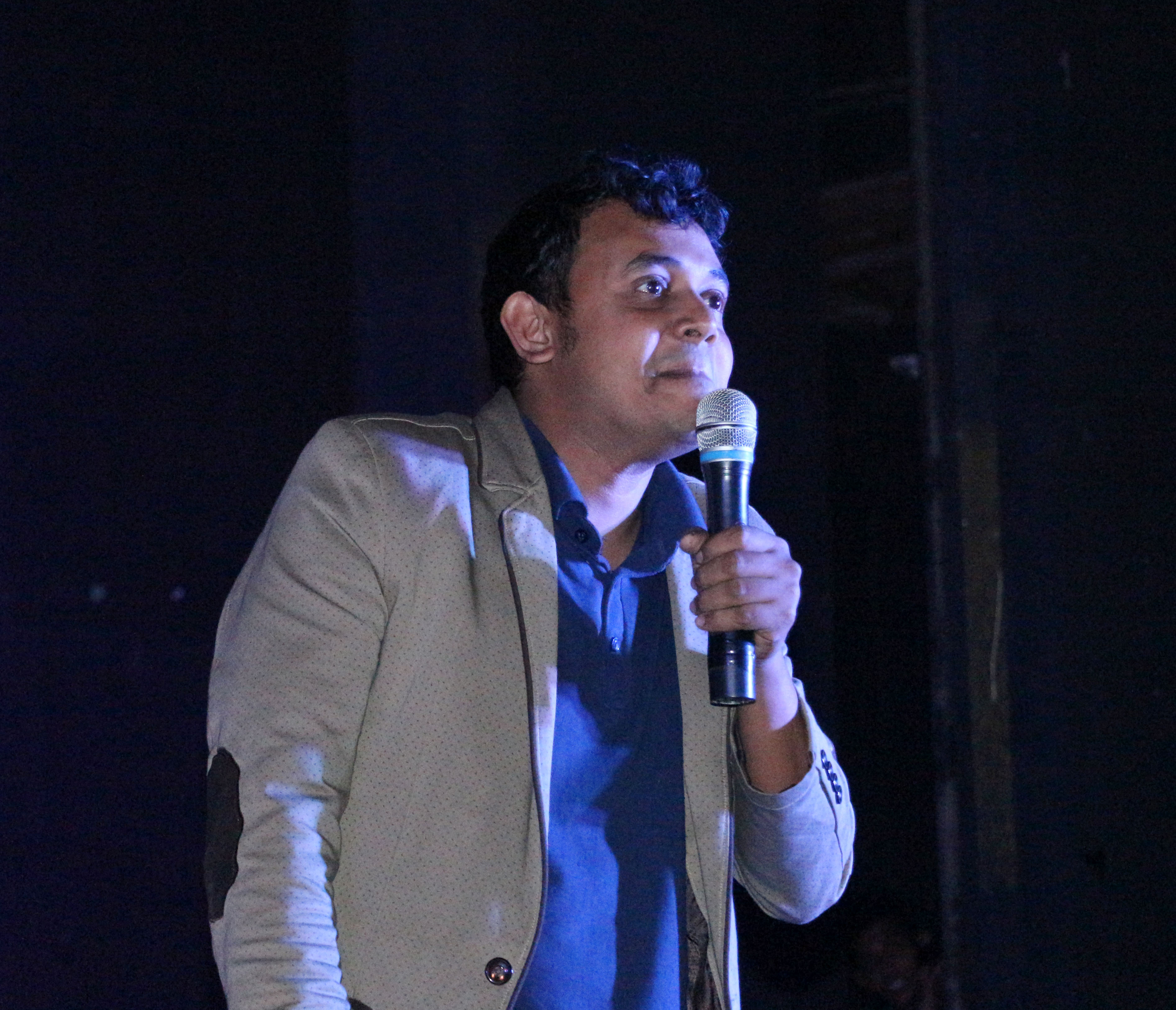
- Rony at Rajshahi University in December 2016
- Born: 14 December 1987 (age 38); Natore District, Bangladesh
- Education: Rajshahi University
- Spouse: Romana Rashid Shompa

Comedy career
- Years active: 2011 – present

Abu Hena Rony (born 14 December 1987) is a popular Bangladeshi stand-up comedian, actor, television presenter and model. In 2011, he won the sixth season of Mirakkel Akkel Challenger, a stand-up comedy reality show popular in Bangladesh and West Bengal. He was the first Bangladeshi contestant to win the competition.

Alongside performing, Rony has been involved in developing stand-up comedy in Bangladesh through comedy organisations and initiatives for emerging performers. His work includes establishing Buno Payra, developing local comedy clubs, and initiating School of Comedy and the School of Comedy Fight competition.

== Primary life ==
Rony was born on 14 December 1987 in village Bildahar of Chamari union under Natore district. His father, Abdul Latif is a retired school teacher and his mother, a housewife. Rony was the second child among the four brothers. He started his education at Akannabigha Primary School. After he became a science student by passing the JSC, he passed SSC from Bildahar High School and HSC from Barendra Government College. He completed graduation and post-graduation from the Department of Drama and Music under Rajshahi University.

== Career ==
=== Stand-up comedy ===
From childhood, Rony entertained his friends through stand-up comedy performances. In 2010, he first appeared as a contestant on Ha-Show, a stand-up comedy competition broadcast on NTV. In July 2011, he participated in Mirakkel, a stand-up comedy reality show broadcast on India's Zee Bangla. He placed first, either individually or jointly, in 25 of the show's first 40 episodes. He subsequently became a joint champion of Mirakkel Akkel Challenger 6, sharing the title with Vicky and Partha. His success brought him recognition among Bengali-speaking audiences outside Bangladesh.

Rony runs an organisation called Buno Payra to develop new stand-up comedians and promote stand-up comedy in Bangladesh. According to a 2020 report by Ekushey Television, he established 64 comedy clubs across Bangladesh's 64 districts through the Bangladesh Comedy Club, with activities extending to the thana level in some areas. The report also mentioned a comedy club at the University of Rajshahi. These clubs were managed by their members and were centrally accountable to Buno Payra and the Bangladesh Comedy Club.

=== Television presenting ===
Alongside stand-up comedy, Rony has presented programmes on several television channels. These include Hashte Moder Mana on Bangladesh Television, the stand-up comedy reality show Ha-Show on NTV, Ajker Ananya on Gazi TV, Comedy Hour and Cine Music on ATN Bangla, Khude Roshikraj on Banglavision, and Jadur Shohor on Boishakhi Television. He has also presented Banglavision's comedy and satirical talk show Talk Misti Jhal.

=== Acting ===
Alongside stand-up comedy, Rony has acted in television dramas, telefilms and feature films. He completed his bachelor's and master's degrees in drama at the University of Rajshahi. His interest in performing on stage developed through acting in cultural programmes at school and college. According to the biography on his official website, he specialised in acting during his postgraduate studies.

His television acting credits include the dramas Kaktaruar Deshe and Chatushkon. He has also appeared in Goutam Koiri's telefilms Kagojer Camera and Jochonay Megher Achor. In Kagojer Camera, broadcast on NTV during Eid in 2014, he appeared alongside Proshun Azad and Shyamol Mawla.

Rony made his debut in Bangladeshi cinema with Swapno Je Tui, directed by Monirul Islam Sohel. He subsequently played Bishu in Padma Patar Jol (2015), directed by Tonmoy Tansen. He later appeared in the Bangladesh–India co-production Tui Amar Rani, directed by Sajal Ahmed and Pijush Saha. His co-stars included Mishti Jannat, Surya, Rajesh Sharma, Supriyo Dutta and Kanchan Mullick. In an interview with Prothom Alo, he also confirmed appearing in Tom and Jerry.

He appeared in Asad Sarkar's Jibon Pakhi, released in 2022. The film addresses suicide prevention and social awareness. Its cast also included Azad Abul Kalam, Mohona Mim, Sanjib Ahmed, Fatema Tuz Zohra and Muhin.

Discussing his acting preferences in an interview with Boishakhi Online, Rony said that he felt comfortable with work involving humour and humanity. He also stated that he enjoyed bringing a subtle touch of humour to serious characters.

== Performance style ==
Rony's stand-up comedy draws on observations of everyday life. A report by Boishakhi Online identified humorous stories drawn from ordinary experiences and socially conscious jokes as features of his performances. In an interview with Prothom Alo, he discussed using traffic congestion, life in Dhaka and everyday experiences as themes for episodes of Talk Misti Jhal.

His writing also involves wordplay. Discussing his book Rony Bani, he said that he had attempted to reinterpret familiar Bengali sayings. He gave examples of changing the wording and meaning of established expressions to create humorous and satirical statements.

Rony studied drama and music at the University of Rajshahi. In discussing comedy training, he has emphasised scriptwriting, improvisation, stage presentation, body language, comic timing and understanding audiences. In an interview with Boishakhi Online, he stated that these subjects were included in the curriculum of his School of Comedy.

He also values immediate audience feedback during live performances. According to Rony, live comedy allows performers to observe laughter, reactions and non-verbal responses as they happen, while television requires more measured speech and involves editing restrictions. He has said that he feels most comfortable presenting programmes that allow direct interaction with audiences.

Banglavision's Talk Misti Jhal combines topical themes, conversations with guests and humorous presentation. Rony has also presented programmes including the children's talent competition Khude Roshikraj, Hashte Moder Mana on Bangladesh Television, and Cine Music on ATN Bangla.

=== Partial singer ===
He had sung so many songs before presenting his jokes in Mirakkel. In 2018, a song "Beche Thakbo Jotodin, Bhalobasbo Totodin" was sung by him which was directed by Asad Sarkar and uploaded by YouTube channel "Bangla Moulik Gaan".

== Publications ==
Alongside his stage performances, Rony has written books of jokes and humorous prose. Following his success in Mirakkel Akkel Challenger, his first book, Mirakkel Jokes Lao Thela, was published at the Ekushey Book Fair in 2014. Another book, Anando Tai Mati, followed in 2015.

His writing also includes humorous personal experiences and works for children. Khat-e Bondhu, published by Rup Prokashon at the 2016 Ekushey Book Fair, recounts amusing incidents from his life. Panjeree Publications also announced his children's book Buddhir Proshno Mojar Uttor for the same fair.

School of Comedy was published by Rup Prokashon at the 2017 Ekushey Book Fair. It contains techniques for telling jokes, advice on participating in comedy competitions and a selection of jokes. Discussing the book with Prothom Alo, Rony described its guidance on comedy performance and preparation for competitions.

School of Comedy includes joke-telling techniques to help with stand-up comedy performance, along with advice on participating in comedy competitions. The book also contains a selection of jokes.

His publications also include Hasir Patro, a collection of satire and humorous prose published by Borshadupur. The same publisher released his seventh book, Rony Bani, at the 2024 Ekushey Book Fair. Rony said that the book reinterprets familiar sayings by changing their wording and meaning to create humorous and satirical statements.

== Awards and recognition ==
Rony has received a stand-up comedy competition title and honours in Bangladesh and abroad.

Year / edition	Event	Award or recognition	Details
Sixth season	Mirakkel Akkel Challenger 6, Zee Bangla	Joint champion	Shared the title with Vicky and Partha from India.
2013	Natyaduar's tenth-anniversary festival	Special honour	Rony and Anwarul Alam Sajal received special honours at the festival in Puthia, Rajshahi.
2017	Anandamela, Los Angeles	Certificate of recognition	Received a certificate on behalf of the city at Anandamela in Los Angeles. It was presented by councilman Khan Mohammad Ali and city commissioner Maruf Islam.
2025	Greenleaf Award Season 7 and reception for distinguished individuals	Honour	

== Initiatives and advertising career ==
=== School of Comedy ===
In 2025, Abu Hena Rony launched School of Comedy, an initiative that began with stand-up comedy performances under the slogan “Ekhane uchit shikkha dewa hoy” (“People are taught a lesson here”). According to his official website, its inaugural event took place on 5 October 2025 at the Zahed Hasan Auditorium of Bishwo Shahitto Kendro in Dhaka. The initiative was conceived by Rony and organised by Backbenchers Communications. In an announcement published by Prothom Alo, Rony outlined plans to expand the initiative beyond stand-up shows to explore the role of humour in different aspects of life.

A subsequent performance was announced at the Natmandal auditorium of the University of Dhaka. According to the organisers, the initiative aimed to use humour as a means of learning and provide opportunities for young performers to practise regularly. The proceeds from that particular event were pledged towards the treatment of an injured university student.

=== School of Comedy Fight ===
In 2026, Abu Hena Rony initiated School of Comedy Fight, a stand-up comedy reality competition intended to identify emerging comedians and provide regular performance opportunities. Ajker Patrika identified Abu Hena Rony as the show's principal initiator.

According to Abu Hena Rony's official website, the competition was a School of Comedy production, with its concept and creative leadership provided by Abu Hena Rony. Backbenchers Communications, the advertising agency of which Abu Hena Rony is a co-founder and Creative Director, provided overall supervision. The website identifies School of Comedy as the organizer and states that the event was held on the initiative of Bangladesh Comedy Club.

The official website records the opening round as taking place on 4 October 2026 at the Studio Theatre Hall of Bangladesh Shilpakala Academy in Dhaka.

The organizers announced plans for a year-round competition offering participation opportunities to comedians from all eight divisions of Bangladesh. Actor Tushar Khan, actresses Shabnam Faria and Nabila Islam, and humour writer Khairul Babui were announced as judges. The assessment criteria included originality, subject matter, presentation, comic timing and audience engagement, with live audience responses also taken into consideration.

Discussing the competition's objectives, Abu Hena Rony said that it aimed to address the shortage of regular performance opportunities and organized platforms for emerging comedians, while bringing talent from different regions of Bangladesh to wider attention.

=== Buno Payra and Bangladesh Comedy Club ===
Alongside performing, Abu Hena Rony established Buno Payra, an organization for practicing comedy, and worked to develop local comedy clubs across Bangladesh.

Abu Hena Rony also helped establish Bangladesh Comedy Club in 2014. A 2017 report in The Daily Ittefaq credited him with conceiving the organization and identified several other founding members. A January 2024 report in Dainik Azadi described the organization's district committees as providing opportunities for aspiring stand-up comedians to practice at the grassroots level.

The club has organized live stand-up comedy performances. In a 2016 interview with The Independent, its then organizing secretary, Fazlul Haque Shaki, said that the organization aimed to hold a show every month and described a performance held at Muslim Hall in Chittagong.

Its performances have included a World Smile Day show at the Studio Theatre Hall of Bangladesh Shilpakala Academy in October 2025. According to a press release published by Jugantor, Abu Hena Rony performed alongside other stand-up comedians at the event.

In the 2016 report in The Independent, comedian Kamar Uddin Arman cited Abu Hena Rony and Naveed Mahbub as popular performers who were helping younger comedians and contributing to the growth of comedy in Bangladesh.

=== Backbenchers Communications ===
Rony is a co-founder and Creative Director of the Bangladeshi advertising agency Backbenchers Communications. His official biography identifies him as a co-founder, while the agency's website lists him as Creative Director.

The agency's other co-founders are Sohel Ahmed and Fahim Asad Anik. Their LinkedIn profiles identify them respectively as Co-Founder and Head of Creative, and Co-Founder and Head of Client Service.

His advertising work includes ACI Pure Salt's “For 18 Years Lovingly with your family” campaign, created by Backbenchers Communications and published in 2023. The campaign credits published by Ads of the World list him as Creative Director.
