= Ogo Bideshini =

2022 Indian Bengali romantic drama film

- Theatrical release poster
- Directed by: Pratyush
- Written by: Anshuman Pratyush and Prameet
- Produced by: Ashok Dhanuka; Himanshu Dhanuka
- Starring: Ankush Hazra; Alexandra Taylor; Santilal Mukherjee; Manasi Sinha
- Edited by: Md. Kalam
- Music by: Pratik Kundu
- Production company: Film Fare Productions
- Distributed by: Eskay Movies
- Release date: 18 November 2022
- Countries: UK; India
- Language: Bengali

Ogo Bideshini is a 2022 Indian Bengali language romantic drama film written and directed by Anshuman Pratyush and produced by Film Fare Productions. The film stars Ankush Hazra and Alexandra Taylor in the lead roles and was released under the banner of Eskay Movies on 18 November 2022.

== Plot ==
An Indian Bengali boy lives in London with his British girlfriend without his parents' knowledge. When his parents suddenly visit him in London, a comedy of misunderstanding begins.

== Cast ==
- Ankush Hazra as Anath Bandhu (AB)
- Alexandra Taylor as Suzzaine
- Manashi Sinha
- Shantilal Mukherjee
- Rajnandini Paul

== Production ==
The cast includes British actress Alexandra Taylor, Miss Tameside 2020/21 in her acting debut.

== Reception ==
A review states that the sentimental plot is rather enjoyable, despite the film lack of action. Sangbad Pratidin gave the film 2 stars out of 5.
