= Barun Biswas =

Bengali teacher and social activist

- Born: 12 September 1972; Sutia, West Bengal, India
- Died: 5 July 2012 (aged 39); Gobardanga, West Bengal, India
- Cause of death: Murdered (shot)
- Occupations: School teacher, social activist, Revolutioner
- Known for: Protester against the gang rapes in Sutia, West Bengal.

Barun Biswas (12 September 1972 – 5 July 2012) was a Bengali school teacher and a social activist in Sutia, West Bengal, India. In 2000, he co-founded "Sutia Gonodhorshon Pratibad Mancha", an organisation which protested against a local criminal gang, who were using gang-rape to terrorise the people of Sutia. Biswas was murdered on 5 July 2012. In 2013, a Bengali film Proloy was made, based on his life and fight.

== Life and career ==
Biswas was born on 12 September 1972 in Sutia, North 24 Parganas district, West Bengal. His parents, Gita Biswas and Jagadish Biswas, migrated from Faridpur, Bangladesh after the 1971 Bangladesh Liberation War to Acharipara, Panchpota, in North 24 Parganas. His father worked as a labourer during the day and sang for a local theatre group at night to pay for his children's education.

Barun Biswas attended Panchpota Bharadanga High School. He completed his schooling at Gobardanga Khantura High School. He received his B.A. in Bengali from Gobardanga Hindu College, his master's degree from Calcutta University, and his B.Ed from B.T. College, New Barrackpore.

After his education, Biswas passed the West Bengal School Service exam, and chose a career in social work and education. In 1998, he started his career as a school teacher at Mitra Institution (Main) of Kolkata, where he worked till his death. He was also an active member of Panchpota Sashadanga Sarada Seba Sangha.

== Activism ==
=== Ichhamati river and water ===
In 2000, Biswas started a campaign for the construction of a canal to check flooding of the Ichamati and Jamuna rivers. The rivers were causing widespread flooding in Sutia, Bongaon, Swarupnagar, and Gaighata. Biswas drew up a blueprint for the canal. Though initially his plan met with little enthusiasm from local leaders, the government later built the canal. Later, he was involved in the fight against gangs who were illegally blocking and diverting the Ichamati river for their businesses, causing floods in the village area.

=== 2000—2012: Anti-rape activism ===
Sutia and neighbouring villages were engulfed by a criminal gang during the late 1990s and early 2000s. From 2000—2002, 33 rapes (official figure, actual figure may have been much more) and around a dozen murders were committed in Sutia. Biswas formed a group of villagers to fight crime and to demand arrests. In 2000, at age 28, he co-founded "Sutia Gonodhorshon Pratibad Mancha". The organisation started to hold public meetings to protest the rapes. During such a meeting, Biswas said:

If we can't protect our daughters, sisters, wives and mothers, then we shouldn't be living in a civilized society. If we lack the courage to take on the rapists, we deserve more severe punishment than they do.... So come and join us to protect the honour of our women.

Biswas' group helped rape victims give reports to the police that led to arrests of the gang members, including the leader of the gangs, Sushanta Choudhury. Biswas also counselled the raped women.

== Death ==
I am a proud mother who has lost her son. Barun, my youngest, never went on the backfoot despite knowing there was a threat to his life. Till the day Pratibadi Mancha (a social service organization set up set by Barun) raises its voice against all atrocities, my son will remain immortal. Bengali: Barun chilo, Barun ache, Barun thakbe (Barun was, Barun is, and Barun will be)

— Gita Biswas (mother of Barun Biswas) in an interview

At 7:20 pm on 5 July 2012, when returning from Kolkata, Biswas was shot from behind in a parking lot outside the Gobardanga railway station. Subsequently, police from Habra, Gaighata, and Gopal Nagar arrested five men with ties to the Sutia gang. This included the alleged hired killer, Sumanta Debnath, alias Fotke, Debashish Sarkar, Bishwajit Biswas, and Raju Sarkar, most of whom were local students. The alleged assassin reportedly confessed to the police that he was contracted by gang leader Sushanta Choudhury, who was serving life imprisonment in Dum Dum Central Jail Later died in prison.

== Legacy ==
In the 2013 Durga Puja, Panchpota Avijan Sangha Durga Puja Committee used Biswas' life and struggle as their puja's festive theme. They also named their puja platform Barun Mancha (Barun platform). Manobendra Biswas, joint secretary of the puja committee told—

Barun's mamabari (maternal house) was in Sutia Panchpota and he had spent his childhood here. When Sutia was virtually ruled by rapists and criminals, he started a movement to help villagers fight the reign of terror through Sutia Pratibadi Mancha... Durga Puja marks the victory of Durga over Mahishasura and Barun's fight epitomizes the victory of good over evil.

== In popular culture ==
In August 2013, the Bengali film Proloy was made on the life of Biswas, where Parambrata Chatterjee portrayed the role of Barun Biswas. Raj Chakraborty, who was the director of the film, declared it to be a tribute to Biswas. The first look poster and trailer of the film was released at Biswas's house in Sutia, on 5 July 2013, on his death anniversary.
