= Neel Rajar Deshe =

- Neel Rajar Deshe
- Directed by: Riingo Banerjee
- Starring: Indrani Haldar; Ashish Vidyarthi; Tathoi
- Music by: Bickram Ghosh
- Release date: 25 January 2008
- Country: India
- Language: Bengali

Neel Rajar Deshe (Bengali: নীল রাজার দেশে "In the Land of the Blue King") (2008) is a Bengali film Directed by Riingo Banerjee.

== Plot ==
This "adventure story for kids" revolves around a naughty and adolescent kid, Raja’s (Aryann Bhowmik) adventures during his holidays spent in his home in the picturesque backdrop of North Bengal at the foothills of the mountains. Once, while he is playing with his bunch of friends and kid sister Chhoti (Tathoi Deb), near the forests, he discovers a child, his body covered with festering wounds from rat bites and mice bites, hidden in a big hole in the ground. He finds out from a television news channel that Neel, the son of wealthy parents, has been kidnapped and kept hidden in the hole for a ransom. The chief kidnapper, a sinister character named Pandey is hiding in Raja’s house as Raja’s father, a taxi-driver, is involved in the kidnapping. In a moment of greed, he helped deliver the kidnapped child in his taxi. Pandey panics when he realises that Raja has chanced upon the truth and holds Raja’s family captive in their own house.

This movie's story similar to I m not scared Italian movie.

== Cast ==
- Indrani Haldar
- Ashish Vidyarthi
- Rajesh Sharma
- Tathoi Deb
- Aryann Bhowmik
- Rishav
- Nirban
- Bobby
- Aishwarya
- Bumba

== Music ==
The music was composed by Bickram Ghosh.

Neel Rajar Deshe

Soundtrack album by Bickram Ghosh
- Released: 2008
- Genre: Feature film soundtrack
- Label: Big Music
- Producer: Rajiv Mehra

Bickram Ghosh chronology
Debaki (2005)	Neel Rajar Deshe (2008)	Little Zizou (2009)

The tracks from the film include:

Track	Singer	Duration	Notes
"Bhorer Akash"	Saptak	5:16	
"Neel Rajar Deshe" (Theme)		1:48	
"Dour" (Instrumental)		1:17	
"Neel Neel Rajar Deshe"	Bickram Ghosh, Diganto Banerjee	4:56	
"Jolke Chol" (Instrumental)		1:52	
"Dure Kothao" (Instrumental)		2:39	
"Akasher Shimanay"	Saptak, Keka Ghoshal, Piasa majumdar, Pratiti Chatterjee, Ronit Roy	6:16	
"Chottobela" (Instrumental)		2:07	
"Jhor Uthechhe"		0:49	
"Akasher Shimanay" (Instrumental)		5:57	
"Bhorer Akash" (Remix)	Rupak Das, Bickram Ghosh	4:54	
"Akasher Shimanay" (Theme)		1:52	
