= Aritra =

Aritra (Bengali: অরিত্র) or Aritro is a masculine South Asian name mostly common among people of Bengali origin in India and Bangladesh. The name generally means "one who shows the right path" or "navigator". The meaning derives from an earlier usage meaning "helmsman" or "one who steers a sailboat". Some other sources claim its meaning as "one who kills enemies".

A variant of this name, Aritraa is a less frequent feminine name also found among Bengalis.

Notable people with the name include:

- Aritra Dutta Banik, Bengali film actor
- Aritra Mukherjee, Bengali filmmaker
- Aritra Sen, Bengali filmmaker
