= Abar Bibaho Obhijaan =

Indian Bengali film

- Directed by: Soumik Haldar
- Written by: Rudranil Ghosh; Somnath Mondal
- Produced by: Shrikant Mohta; Mahendra Soni
- Starring: Ankush Hazra; Nusraat Faria; Anirban Bhattacharya
- Edited by: Subho Pramanik
- Music by: Jeet Gannguli
- Production company: Shree Venkatesh Films
- Release date: 25 May 2023
- Running time: 119 minutes
- Country: India
- Language: Bengali

Abar Bibaho Obhijaan is a 2023 Indian Bengali-language comedy drama film directed by Soumik Haldar and produced by Shrikant Mohta and Mahendra Soni. The film stars Ankush Hazra, Nusraat Faria, Anirban Bhattacharya, Rudranil Ghosh, Priyanka Sarkar and Sohini Sarkar.

This film was released under the banner of Shree Venkatesh Films on 25 May 2023.

== Plot ==
Following the events of the previous film that took place in 2019, now in 2023, Rajat and Anupam return to their former lives, but not as they expected. Anupam is not only back to the cooking duties of his wife, Rai, but is also participating in Rai's political movements and protests. Meanwhile Rajat has become overly religious and a devotee of Lord Krishna, creating troubles for his boss and his colleagues.

One day on receiving an anonymous call from a stranger, both of them reach an unknown location, the person who called them is none other than Ganesh Maity a.k.a. Bullet Singh. Bullet tells Anupam and Rajat that his late father has left a property worth 100 crores and he wants to give them a 50% share of the property. To claim the property, they must reach Bangkok within three days or they'll lose it. On hearing this, Rajat and Anupam get ready to leave for Bangkok by lying to their respective wives that they have received the money from an insurance policy. All of them reach Thailand where they are welcomed by Michael, the manager of the property. Next morning, they all wake up to find their bags missing. They are presented before Bolihari, a dangerous gangster and a Mafia boss and his daughter, Matahari.

Bolihari explains that Bullet doesn't own 100 crores. He owes him 100 crores instead for the debt Bullet's cellmate, Zico, failed to pay.

The news of Anupam, Rajat and Bullet's presence in Bangkok reaches the police headquarters in Kolkata, where all the respective wives have gathered to ask for help. The commissioner calls Zico who reveals that he had fooled Bullet in order to get rid of him. Feeling scared for their husband's lives, Maya, Rai and Malati decide to travel to Bangkok to rescue them with assistance from Indian Police. Rajat, Bullet and Anupam are now on verge of being executed as they have failed to pay off the debt. They're just about to be executed when Rajat screams "Hare Krishna" forcing Bolihari to stop and let them free, asking who said they reveal it's Rajat, it turned out both Bolihari and his daughter are devotees of Lord Krishna, now Bolihari has left a condition i.e. if any three of them marry his daughter all their loans will be waived, Anupam and Bullet then plan that Rajat will marry Matihari.

Rajat is dismayed as he is already married to Maya and can't break her heart. But Anupam had already made plans, and much to Rajat's dismay the marriage is happening on same day, as the marriage preparations are ongoing all the three wives reach the marriage venue accompanied by Royal Thai Police to nab Bolihari. As the three enter they are welcomed by the guests who praise Maya as she is wearing saree, fearing that it might expose them, they change into western outfits, Rajat feels disgust as he is gets married, but he is following Anupam's instruction, as the vermilion ceremony comes Rajat immediately collapses and dies much to Matahari's dismay, but suddenly Anupam notices Michael smiling on Rajat's death: Rajat is feigning his death per Anupam's plan. As everyone leaves, Rajat catches Michael as he heard him speaking in Bengali, Michael's true colours gets revealed, his actual name is Madhusudan Dutta. Madhusudan reveals following the ongoing scams in Kolkata as he was part of them, he fled from Kolkata and settled in Bangkok and feigned Russian Brazilian ancestry and worked for Bolihari and his gang, it turned out that Madhusudhan liked Matahari but cannot tell his true identity as he is an Indian as it turned out that many Indian men have cheated her for money and at last was Zico. Rajat immediately wakes up and reveals that they all want to return to their wives in India. Suddenly Matahari arrives and cries, all three wives come altogether accompanied by Bullet himself all of them then revealed them as weepers from India. After learning Rajat is alive, they plan to shift him to coffin and then escape via the Airport to India. Unfortunately Rajat's cover is blown, angering Bolihari but suddenly he and his gang are arrested by the police. Seeing the opportunity Rajat, Anupam and Bullet escape to a nearby dock from there they will flee to Airport followed by Matahari, Madhusudhan and their wives as they all three arrive, the boat leaves the docks, but they are surrounded by Matahari pointing a gun at Rajat for cheating him, but their wives arrive and save them. Madhusudhan also arrives and then expresses his love to Matahari who then accepts him and they share a kiss. The men respond by troubling in home and the wives respond with "lets break the balls".

== Cast ==
- Ankush Hazra as Anupam
- Nusraat Faria as Rai
- Anirban Bhattacharya as Ganesh Maity/Gansha/Bullet Singh
- Rudranil Ghosh as Rajat
- Sohini Sarkar as Maya
- Priyanka Sarkar as Malati
- Sourav Das as Michael, aka Madhusudan Dutta

== Music ==
The music of the film was composed by Jeet Gannguli.

No.	Title	Lyrics	Singer(s)	Length
1.	"Shob e Maya"	Prasen	Aditya Dev	2:50
2.	"Mon Bajare"	Prasen	Nakash Aziz	2:23
3.	"Abar Bibaho Obhijaan Title Track"	Anirban Bhattacharya	Anirban Bhattacharya, Debraj Bhattacharya	2:30
Total length:				7:43
