= Mirakkel =

Indian comedy-reality show

- Also known as: Mirakkel Akkel Challenger
- Genre: Stand-up Comedy
- Created by: Zee Bangla
- Written by: Dr. Krishnendu Chatterjee, Arnab Karmakar and Sangeet Tewari
- Directed by: Subhankar Chattopadhyay
- Presented by: Mir Afsar Ali
- Judges: Sayantika Banerjee, Biswanath Basu, Paoli Dam, Kanchan Mullick
- Voices of: Kiran Ajij
- Narrated by: Indranil Das
- Theme music composer: Megha Das Kabiraj, Prabir Sutradhar
- Opening theme: Mohammod Zahirul
- Ending theme: uddhab Kabiraj
- Composer: Aritra
- Country of origin: India
- Original language: Bengali
- No. of seasons: 11

Production
- Producer: Zee Bangla
- Editor: Biplab Mandal
- Camera setup: Sriparna Das And Indranil Das
- Running time: 1.5 hours

Original release
- Network: Zee Bangla
- Release: 2006 – present

Mirakkel is an Indian reality show on Zee Bangla hosted by Mir Afsar Ali and directed by Subhankar Chattopadhyay. It is produced by Subhankar Chattopadhyay Productions. The show features stand-up comedians who are judged by Paran Bandyopadhyay, Sreelekha Mitra and Rajatava Dutta. The band Bandage, with musicians Dwaipayan Saha, Nitin Mani, Suman Sinha, Subhajit Sarkar, Koushik and Saurav Bhattacharya, is responsible for the music. The Times of India has called it "one of the most popular shows on Bengali television", and the Daily Observer wrote that it "has garnered huge popularity in Bangladesh".

In 2011, the sixth season of Mirakkel, Mirakkel Akkel Challenger 6, was broadcast. After it ended, the producers launched another sub-season of Mirakkel called Mirakkel Akkel Challenger Awesomesala which ran for a year.

== Seasons ==
=== Season 1: Mirakkel Akkel Challenger 1 (2006) ===
The winner was Tapan Das.

=== Season 2: Mirakkel Akkel Challenger 2 (2007) ===
For the 2007 season, Tollywood actress Sreelekha Mitra was a judge along with regular judges Rudranil Ghosh and Rajatava Dutta. The winner was Atanu Burman.

=== Season 3: Mirakkel Bare Miya Chhote Miya (2008) ===
In the 2008 season, contestants from previous seasons competed against newcomers. Rajatava Dutta, Srelekha Mitra, and Sidhu from Bengali band Cactus were initially the judges. Mitra was later replaced by Debolina Dutta. Mridul Bhattacharya was the winner, defeating season 2 champion Atanu Barman in the final.

=== Season 4: Mirakkel Akkel Challenger 4 (2009) ===
This season was only for child performers. It was hosted by Mridul Bhattacharya. The winner was Tania Roy from Burdwan.

=== Season 5: Mirakkel Akkkel Challenger 5 (2010) ===
In season 5, Pranjol from Bijaygarh was the champion.

=== Season 6: Mirakkel Akkkel Challenger 6 (2011) ===
Season 6 started with 30 participants on 11 July 2011, hosted by Ali. This time the contestants included people from Bangladesh. The judges were the usual team, and the usual band Bandage played. The mentors this season were Rajeev Banerji, Saurav Palodhi, Krishnendu Chatterjee, Arnab Karmakar and Subhadip Ghosh. The joint winners were Vicky and Partha (together) and Abu Hena Rony.

=== Season 7: Mirakkel Akkkel Challenger 6 Awesomesala (2012) ===
This was an additional sub-season starting after the grand finale of season 6. Comedians from season 6 participated in this season along with some new comedians from West Bengal and Bangladesh. Abu Hena Rony and Vicky with Partha were the joint season champions.

=== Season 8: Mirakkel Akkel Challenger 7 (2013) ===
The seventh season started on 25 February 2013 with 27 participants. It was hosted by Ali and the usual judges. Mentors were Saurav Palodhi, Krishnendu Chatterjee, Arnab Karmakar and Subhadip Ghosh. The winner of this season was Subhashis Mukherjee.Most famous participants were Jay Bhadra & Krishna Bannerjee,

=== Season 9: Mirakkel Akkel Challenger 8 (2014) ===
The eighth season started on 4 August 2014 with 74 episodes. It was hosted by Ali and the usual judges. Mentors were Krishnendu Chatterjee, Arnab Karmakar, Sangeet Tewari and Shawon Majumder. The winner was Kaju, also known as Chiranjeet Halder. The price was a new car, advertising chance of Pran and three lakhs rupees.

=== Season 10: Mirakkel Akkel Challenger 9 (2015-2016) ===
The last season started on 10 December 2015 and had 82 episodes. It was hosted by Ali and the usual judges. Mentors were Krishnendu Chatterjee, Arnab Karmakar, Sangeet Tewari, Ishtiak Nasir, Shawon Majumder and Iman Chakraborty. The joint winners were Aditya Sarkar, Raktima Das and Suman Gayen. Special guests were Indrani Haldar, Rachna Banerjee, Anupam Roy, Sidhartha Sankar "Sidhu" Ray from the band Cactus, Saheb Chatterjee and Raj Chakraborty. Two special guests performed, Rudranil Ghosh and Kanchan Mullick. The series was filmed over seven months.

=== Season 11 : Mirakkel Akkel Challenger 10 (2020-2021) ===
This series was broadcast following a break of four years. Again, the host was Mir Afsar Ali, but the judges were changed. The new judges were Sayantika Banerjee, Biswanath Basu, Paoli Dam and Kanchan Mullick. It was announced that Soham Chakraborty and Rudranil Ghosh would join later. The mentors were Saurav Palodhi, Subhadip Ghosh, Vicky Nandy, Anik Modak, Iman Chakraborty and Sangeet Tewari. The joint winners were Santanu Mondal and Suvajit Das (শুভজিৎ দাস). This season ended on 30 May 2021.
