= Case Jaundice =

Indian web series

- Release poster
- Genre: Comedy
- Directed by: Subhankar Chattopadhyay
- Country of origin: India
- Original language: Bengali
- No. of seasons: 1
- No. of episodes: 10

Production
- Production company: Subhankar Chattopadhyay Production

Original release
- Release: 15 May 2020 – present

Case Jaundice is a 2020 Indian Bengali comedy web series. It is a series that has been made entirely during the lockdown period. Directed by Subhankar Chattopadhyay the web series and shorts shot during the lockdown period of the COVID-19 pandemic. All the cast and crew members have worked in the limitation of shooting remotely from home. In the web series all the characters communicated through phone and video calls.

== Description ==
The series features only three characters, Two lawyers and one Judge played by Parambrata Chatterjee (Mr. Sen), Ankush Hazra (Mr. Das) and Anirban Chakraborty (Judge). This anthology comedy series has ten episodes containing 10 different topics. Two layers battling it out on a variety of subjects relating to the COVID-19 crisis, including the use of masks to commit petty crimes, the existential crisis faced by movie theatres, and so on and so forth. The series started streaming on the Bengali OTT platform hoichoi from 15 May 2020.

== Cast ==
- Parambrata Chatterjee as Mr. Sen
- Ankush Hazra as Mr. Das
- Anirban Chakraborty as the Judge

== Episodes ==
Series	Episodes	Originally released
1	10	15 May 2020

== Season 1 ==
The series started streaming from 15 May 2020 with five episodes. Later on, 29 May hoichoi released more five episodes.

No.	Title	Directed by	Original release date
1	"Humans Vs. Corona"	Subhankar Chattopadhyay	15 May 2020
2	"Police Vs. Mask"	Subhankar Chattopadhyay	15 May 2020
3	"Private Vs. Public Society"	Subhankar Chattopadhyay	15 May 2020
4	"Work Vs. Home"	Subhankar Chattopadhyay	15 May 2020
5	"Man Vs. Wild"	Subhankar Chattopadhyay	15 May 2020
6	"Work from home Vs. Work from office"	Subhankar Chattopadhyay	29 May 2020
7	"Lyadhkhor Bong Vs. The Active Bong"	Subhankar Chattopadhyay	29 May 2020
8	"Classic Romance Vs. Digital Romance"	Subhankar Chattopadhyay	29 May 2020
9	"Films Vs. The Censor Board"	Subhankar Chattopadhyay	29 May 2020
10	"I Do Fear Vs. I Don't Care"	Subhankar Chattopadhyay	29 May 2020
