= Adventures of Jojo =

2018 film

- Official poster
- Directed by: Raj Chakraborty
- Written by: Padmanabha Dasgupta (Dialogues)
- Screenplay by: Padmanabha Dasgupta
- Story by: Padmanabha Dasgupta; Raj Chakraborty; Leela Majumdar
- Produced by: Shrikant Mohta; Mahendra Soni
- Starring: Jashojeet Banerjee; Samiul Alam; Rudranil Ghosh; Buddhadeb Bhattacharya; Padmanabha Dasgupta; Manali Manisha Dey
- Cinematography: Soumik Haldar; Manas Ganguly
- Edited by: Sanglap Bhowmik
- Music by: Indraadip Das Gupta
- Production company: Shree Venkatesh Films
- Release date: 21 December 2018
- Country: India
- Language: Bengali

Adventures Of Jojo is a Bengali children action adventure film co-written and directed by Raj Chakraborty, based on Tongling, a novel written by Leela Majumdar. It is inspired by the film "An Elephant's Journey" directed by Richard Boddington. The film was released on 21 December 2018 under the banner of Shree Venkatesh Films.

== Plot ==
The plot revolves around the subject of tiger poaching and wildlife. Jojo, a young and school going boy aged 12, lives with his parents in Kolkata. He dreams of the wilderness and the animals in it. One day his parents go to Vellore to take his grandmother. Jojo goes to his uncle's home to Baropahari in Arunachal Pradesh. He befriends Shibu, a local boy of a similar age. Shibu is the son of a mahout who grew up in the midst of nature and is friendly with animals, especially an elephant named Noni. They make a mission to stop a gang of poachers from killing Chenghiz, a huge tiger who is seen as the protector of the forest.

== Cast ==
- Jashojeet Banerjee as Jojo
- Rudraneel Ghosh as Munia Hazari
- Raj Chakraborty
- Samiul Alam as Shibu
- Santu Saha as Swapan Mama
- Padmanabha Dasgupta
- Abhishek Singh
- Buddhadeb Bhattacharya
- Manali Dey
- Jayasree Bose
- Jeetu Kamal as Forest Officer Sujoy Bose
- Priya Mondal
- Kunal Banerjee
- Kuntal Banerjee
- Pankaj Mullick
- Pausali Sengupta
- Sanjay Bhattacharya

== Soundtrack ==
Track listing
No.	Title	Singer	Length
1.	"Title Track"	Aruna, Ranita, Bihu, John	2:33
2.	"Jojor Gaan"	Arijit Singh	2:46

== Release ==
The official trailer 1 of the film was launched by SVF on 14 November 2018. The official trailer 2 of the film was launched by SVF, fifteen days later on 1 December 2018.

This film was theatrically released on 21 December 2018.
