= Handa and Bhonda =

2010 Indian Bengali film

- DVD Cover
- Directed by: Subhankar Chattopadhyay
- Written by: Padmanabha Dasgupta
- Produced by: Bappa Sarkar
- Starring: Mithun Chakraborty; Aritra Dutta Banik; Biswajit Chakraborty; Supriya Devi; Paran Bandopadhyay
- Cinematography: Premendu Bikash Chaki
- Edited by: Arghyakamal Mitra
- Music by: Surojit Chattopadhyay
- Production company: Zee Motion Pictures
- Distributed by: T Sarkar Productions
- Release date: 26 March 2010
- Country: India
- Language: Bengali

Handa and Bhonda is a 2010 Indian Bengali-language action comedy film directed by Subhankar Chattopadhyay, starring Mithun Chakraborty, Aritra Dutta Banik, Biswajit Chakraborty and Supriya Devi in lead roles.

== Plot ==
Handa is a simple, sincere, and hardworking person, but his honesty lands him in trouble sometimes, created by his not-so-perfect colleagues and his boss. Handa's son, Bhonda, is the exact opposite of his father's character. He is a brat. He steals his father's money, flunks his unit tests, gets punished every day in school, copies his father's signature on the progress report card, bunks classes, and even hits on his most beautiful classmate, Medha. Both hate their life as it is troubled and they are looking for a miracle to happen. Handa wishes he could become a kid again to help teach Bhonda what education could do to an individual. Bhonda wishes to grow up to teach his father a lesson. Both their wishes come true as Bhonda's deceased mother's spirit grants them their wish for seven days. The father has his son's naughty soul and the son now has his father's honest soul. After some hilarious misadventures, Bhonda's soul in Handa's body teaches his colleagues and the boss a good lesson while Handa's soul in Bhonda's body turns over a new leaf as one of the best students in class. In the climax, the father-son duo rescues an orphanage from an evil contractor. The spell is lifted when the seven days are over. Handa is no longer the meek person, who can be taken on a ride. Bhonda gets back to his naughtiness but in the spirit of good fun.

== Cast ==
- Mithun Chakraborty as Mridul Roy aka Handa
- Aritra Dutta Banik as Sayan Roy aka Bhonda, Handa's son
- Biswajit Chakraborty
- Supriya Devi as manager of old orphanage home
- Paran Bandopadhyay as neighbour of Handa-Bhonda
- Sneha Chakraborty
- YourPritam as Sayan's friend
- Nandini Chatterjee

== Critical reception ==
The film received mixed reviews. In The Indian Express, Shoma A. Chatterjee wrote "Lack of originality is the main lapse of this film. Chatterjee borrows generously from Mrinal Sen’s Icchapuran (1969) based on a Tagore story. He also dips into the Hollywood flick Freaky Friday (2003 film)".

== Songs ==
Title	Singer	Info
Tor Chokhe"	Nachiketa Chakraborty	Nachiketa.Net
"Generation Gap"	Surojit, Subhojit, Siddhartha	-
"Akkel Gurum"	Surojit	-
"Satasat Kumror Ghat"	Siddhartha, Surojit	-
"Hey Baby Lets Go Crazy"	Aneek	-
"Sing Sing Sing"	Subhojit	-
Instrumental	-	-
