= Proloy (film) =

2013 Indian Bengali-language film

- Theatrical release poster
- Directed by: Raj Chakraborty
- Written by: Raj Chakraborty
- Produced by: Shree Venkatesh Films
- Starring: Saswata Chatterjee; Parambrata Chatterjee; Mimi Chakraborty; Paran Bandyopadhyay
- Cinematography: Supriyo Dutta
- Edited by: Bodhaditya Banerjee
- Music by: Indraadip Das Gupta
- Production company: Shree Venkatesh Films
- Release date: 9 August 2013
- Country: India
- Language: Bengali

Proloy (transl. Disaster) is a 2013 Indian Bengali language socio-political action-crime thriller film co-written and directed by Raj Chakraborty, produced by Shree Venkatesh Films, starring Parambrata Chatterjee, Paran Bandopadhyay, Saswata Chatterjee, Rudranil Ghosh, Supriyo Dutta and Mimi Chakraborty in lead roles. This movie is inspired on the life of Barun Biswas, a social activist and teacher. The film's music is by Indraadip Dasgupta in his second collaboration with Banerjee, with 2 additional tracks by Nilesh Dasgupta. The film was critically and commercially well received and the performances along with the direction was praised. Throughout the years, the film has gained a cult status and is often regarded as Raj Chakraborty's best film.

== Plot ==
A gang of criminals terrorize the village of Dukhia in rural Bengal, where gang rapes have become common. Both children and aged females are victims. Complicit police authorities refuse to take action against the barbaric criminals because they enjoy an unholy patronage of a local political leader who takes his power and clout for granted. Overcome by a sense of social responsibility, idealist local teacher, Barun Biswas stands up and confronts the scourge and forms an activist group named 'Jagaran Mancha'. They agitate against political patronage the criminals enjoy and demand their immediate arrest. The criminals murder Barun while he was returning from school. Binod Bihari Dutta, who met Barun before his death and was inspired by his idealistic, socially responsible thinking, is shocked to know of Barun's death and rushes to Dukhia to give justice to his memory. He learns of the menace and depravity, the criminals have subjected the village to and the fact that after Barun's death, the criminals were released by the corrupt police officers. Binod Dutta tries to motivate villagers like Barun had done before to continue their fight against this malaise. Special Branch Officer, badass no-nonsense cop Animesh Dutta's posting at Dukhia comes as sweet serendipity, almost divine intervention. He learns of Barun Biswas and his murder from Binod Dutta but friction develops between Binod's idealistic struggle and Animesh' unconventional and semi-legal ways. Mysteriously, the criminals are being murdered one after the other. Rumors float in the village that Barun has returned from the dead to punish his killers. Animesh suspects 'Jagaran Mancha' and believes these killings to be revenge for Barun's murder. He vows to Binod Dutta that he will protect the last criminal as it his duty as a police officer and a public servant. It is revealed that Binod Dutta has been killing the criminals all along in ingenious ways with the help of a few 'Jagaran Mancha' members. After Binod kills the last criminal by ripping his stomach open, Animesh rescues him from the scene, and drops him off outside the village. Animesh has a Machiavellian perspective at the whole thing and decides to bury the case. In the last scene Animesh says he's just become a father and he's going to name his son, "BARUN".

== Cast ==
- Parambrata Chatterjee as Barun Biswas
- Paran Bandopadhyay as Binod Behari Dutta
- Saswata Chatterjee as Inspector Animesh Dutta
- Mimi Chakraborty as Durga
- Rudranil Ghosh as Prashanta Mondal
- Padmanabha Dasgupta as Arun Biswas, Barun Biswas's brother
- Koushik Roy as Nikhil
- Siddhartha Mondal
- Dwaipayan Das as Sujoy
- Diya Mukherjee as Minister's daughter
- Rupa Bhattacharjee
- Supriyo Dutta as MLA Asim Mondal
- Pooja Bose as Special Dancer in "Kala Koi Geli" Item Song

== Soundtrack ==
The film's soundtrack is composed by Indraadip Dasgupta. Two additional tracks were composed by debut composer Nilesh Dasgupta. Singers Nandini Sarkar and Rajat Taneja were introduced in this film as well as Antara Ganguly. The songs were all runaway hits with Hath Dhoreche and Kala Koi Geli being the biggest chartbusters. The making of the song Hath Dhoreche was also released later by Sangeet Bangla. Director Raj Chakraborty stated that the entire song was shot in a situation when the atmospheric temperature was about 35 °C, resulting in quite a hardship for the entire cast and crew. For this song, Shreya Ghoshal won Best Female Vocalist.

Track list
No.	Title	Lyrics	Music	Singer(s)	Length
1.	"Aaye Re"			Arijit Singh, Antara Ganguly	04.37
2.	"Haath Dhoreche"	Srijato	Indraadip Dasgupta	Shreya Ghoshal	04:09
3.	"Kala Koi Geli"	Prasen	Indraadip Dasgupta	Shalmali Kholgade	04.41
4.	"Baje Bina"			Nandini Sarkar, Rajat Taneja	05.15
5.	"Roshni Elo"	Prasen	Indraadip Dasgupta	Arijit Singh, Anweshaa, Sayani, Palit, Indradeep Dasgupta	04:13

Additional Tracks
No.	Title	Lyrics	Music	Singer(s)	Length
8.	"Ghum Paranir Gaan (Based on the main theme by Sonali Banerjee)"	Srijato	Indraadip Dasgupta	Arijit Singh	03:18
9.	"Ghum Bhanganor Gaan"	Angshuman	Indraadip Dasgupta	K. Mohan	02:25

== Spinoff ==
A spinoff named as Abar Proloy was streamed online on Zee5 OTT platform on 11 August 2023. With return of characters from its film, the plot is based on rise of Human Trafficking's incidents in Sundarban region in district of South 24 Parganas.
