= Shibaji =

2008 Indian Bengali film

- Directed by: Babu Ray & Kamal Sarkar
- Written by: Manjil Banerjee
- Produced by: Prasanta Bhattacharjee(Agartala) & Shibu Das(Kolkata)
- Starring: Prosenjit; Swastika Mukherjee; Tathoi Deb
- Music by: Bappi Lahiri
- Release date: 8 August 2008
- Running time: 165 min
- Country: India
- Language: Bengali

Shibaji is a 2008 Indian Bengali language film directed by Babu Ray.

== Plot ==
The story of this film revolves around the main character Shivaji (Prosenjit) who is a goon. He was hired by the villain Bishal Sarkar to kill the judge Prasanta Mullick (Ranjit Mallick) for refusing a bribe and announcing the death sentence for his youngest brother, Vicky Sarkar. Shivaji's wife Durga (Swastika Mukherjee) meanwhile tries to commit suicide after being insulted and humiliated again and again by people. Shivaji ultimately saves her life and leaves all criminal activities. Prasanta Mullick and his wife (Mousumi Saha) help him to start a fast-food centre. But one day Bishal Sarkar's brother along with goons attack the restaurant and kill a person. Inspector Satyaprakash (Tapas Paul) arrests innocent Shivaji and he is imprisoned. Prasanta Mullick resigns from his post as judge, and tries to prove Shivaji's innocence. In this time the three brothers of Bishal Sarkar attack Shivaji's house, kill his daughter Tumpa and rape his wife. Durga commits suicide. To seek revenge Shivaji escapes from police custody and starts killing Bishal Sarkar's brothers one by one. He also kidnaps Inspector Satyaprakash's daughter Jaya (Tathoi). Jaya was a lonely child as her father and mother (Satabdi Roy) never have time for her. She was brought up by her Appa (Chumki Choudhury). Shivaji starts loving her as his daughter, and Jaya also forgets her loneliness. But police separate them and produce Shivaji in court. Suddenly Bishal Sarkar kidnaps Jaya and Shivaji saves her. But while doing so he gets injured though kills all villains. Doctors declare him dead but Tathoi or Jaya magically saves his life by singing in front of God and after 20 years with the marriage of Jaya the movie ends.

== Cast ==
- Prosenjit Chatterjee as Shibaji
- Tathoi Deb
- Swastika Mukherjee
- Tapas Paul
- Satabdi Roy
- Ranjit Mallick
- Saibal Banerjee
