= Kanamachi (TV series) =

Indian Bengali TV series

- Genre: Thriller; Drama
- Created by: Raj Chakraborty Productions
- Written by: Abhimanyu Mukherjee; Koushik Bhattacharya; Prasenjit Maity
- Story by: Padmanabha Dasgupta
- Directed by: Suman Das; Tamal Maity
- Creative director: Abhimanyu Mukherjee
- Starring: See below
- Voices of: Madhura Bhattacharya
- Country of origin: India
- Original language: Bengali
- No. of episodes: 240

Production
- Executive producers: Anindya; Lopamudra (Star Jalsha); Siddhartha; Arijit
- Producer: Raj Chakraborty
- Cinematography: Paritosh Singh
- Editors: Dipanjan De, Srimanta
- Production company: Raj Chakraborty Productions

Original release
- Network: Star Jalsha
- Release: 9 June 2014 – 14 March 2015

Related
- Sokhi; Shob Choritro Kalponik

Kanamachi is a Bengali-language television series that premiered on 9 June 2014 on Star Jalsha. The series starred Farhan Imroze and Joyeeta Goswami in lead roles and Anindita Bose, Sudip Mukherjee, Monoj Ojha and Mohua Halder in supporting roles. It was directed by Suman Das and Tamal Maity.

== Plot ==
The series stars a young IPS officer Abhimanyu (Farhan Imroze) and a young girl Kotha (Joyeeta Goswami) from the Robin Hood Gang. The Robin Hood Gang is a team of Seven members led by the Master, Indrajit Roy (Sudip Mukherjee). The squad was formed by the Master specifically to exact severe retribution against particular people from the past, even though it was intended to serve the interests of underprivileged people. Abhi's task was to apprehend the Robin Hood Gang, and by discovering the way to join the squad, he almost succeeds. Abhi, eventually realizes that the team was full of mystery, and his curiosity fastened him to disguise as a member of the team until he is accomplished in revealing the truth that the team members are actually good people with a tragic past and they are not hardcore criminals. Delaying of the arrest sent threat to Abhi from the police department, and finally the order comes to killing all the members of the team. Abhi does not do so – rather he keeps on finding the mystery behind the team. As a result, the department suspends Abhi. In fact, the act of suspending was committed by a Minister.

The Minister, a lawyer (Ramen Shikder) and a doctor (Kamalesh Chatterjee) was once involved in a crime of framing two persons, one was the father of Kotha (Shounak Mitra) and the other was the Master himself. As a matter of fact, Master was an IPS officer who was assigned to investigate the incidents of the Banerjee NGO where secret antisocial activities were being done by the evil minister and the lawyer. Indrajeet tried to expose the real truth behind the conspiracy act against Kotha's father as well, but the three of the master-villain framed him in an act of molestation over a woman, which results in execution. But fortunately Master survives and undergrounds himself for a while and creates the Robin Hood team for retribution.

Abhi tried to help find Kotha's mother, who was lost from her when she was a child. As the case was related of Kotha's father and the Master was the same, Abhi seems to reach to uncover the truth at an astonishing pace. The whole mystery was related to the Banerji NGO. Master tries to scare the three villains by untraceable threat calls, which leads to a thought to the Minister that the whole problem of prank was done by Abhi due to suspending him, consequently trying to kill him. But every time he tries to do so, he fails to accomplish because of Abhi's quick-witted talents. Eventually Doctor Kamalesh, one of the three villains, was killed by the Minister. Furthermore, he killed Jiban Shomaddar (uncle to Kotha), who was the only evidence of the Banerji NGO in Abhi's opinion – later Abhi realizes that that was not the only option. Minister's wishes to kill Abhi and Kotha brings an officer Bhashkor in the series, who constantly attempts to do so for in vain.

Eventually Abhi solves the whole mystery and learns what actually instigated Master to form Team Robinhood. Abhi's paternal aunt, Malabika Banerjee, who was the head of the Banerjee-NGO, along with the Minister, the Lawyer (Ramen) and the dead doctor (Kamalesh) was engaged in trafficking. Sounak Mitra, Kotha's father, had somehow learnt the truth and so the three had caused ample harassment to him – got him arrested on false charges of molestation, following which Sounak had committed suicide. The three had also molested Amrita Das Majumder, a woman working in the NGO. Indrajit Roy (Master), who was then an honest police officer was investigating the case but the minister and his troops had even trapped Indrajit and Indrajit was prosecuted. But Indrajit somehow escaped death and formed team Robinhood in order to punish the Minister and help the common masses. Later we come to know that Master is Abhi's real father and Abinash Mukherjee had saved him before Master's (Back then Indrajeet) house was burned down and adopted him as his own son.

After completing the investigation, Abhi vows to punish the actual criminals and give justice to Master. Master disguises as an old man and visits abinash mukherjee's house where he discovers that Abhi is an IPS officer and he had undercovered himself to be a part of the robinhood gang, an infuriated master returns to his hideout and reveals the truth to the team leaving katha and others heartbroken of abhi's betrayal.Eventually master realizes that they cannot hide anymore and they flee their hideout and go to another one. Master wears his old uniform and prepares the team for a final showdown against the minister and the lawyer. Minister and lawyer are eventually caught on road by the robinhood gang and master holds both his offenders at gun point. Eventually IPS abhimanyu arrives with full police force and asks the gang to surrender but master and the entire team refuses. Abhi convinces the master that killing the minister would make the entire team face death penalty which ofc master doesn't want. Master and the entire team surrenders and Abhi is forced to arrest them and everyone is presented at the court. Meanwhile, Abhi interrogates the team but soon realizes that ramen's life is at stake because minister is about to kill him as ramen's death will remove all evidence against the minister, but Abhi tricks the minister and succeeds to gather evidence against him.In the court the minister and ramen are eventually proven guilty and they get sentenced to lifetime imprisonment. Leela, Kotha's mother, who, after her husband's death, had been forced to take up prostitution, shoots the Minister to death. At the end the entire robinhood gang sentenced to 1 – 2 years of imprisonment for their petty crimes and robberies and Abhi introduces Kotha to her mother.

Kotha, after a year, gets released from the jail, which brings a new plot to the story. While returning to her convent school in Darjeeling, she comes across Anindya and Tanaya. They meet with a car accident and so by twist of fate (in which Tanaya dies), Kotha has to come back to Kolkata as Tojo's (Tanaya's son) governess. There she wins the heart of everyone. In the meantime, Ananya (sister to Tanaya) and Shima (mother to Tanaya) tries to trigger conspiracy on Kotha, but Kotha is intelligent enough to fight back. Meanwhile, Anindo falls for Kotha and wants to marry her, to which Kotha agrees for Tojo's sake, although she loves Abhi. But later, Anindya sacrifices Kotha after realizing her love for Abhi and then, Abhi finally marries Kotha. However, the actual identity of Master, that is, Master or Indrajit Roy is himself Abhi's real father was not revealed to Abhi.

== Cast ==
- Farhan Imroze as IPS officer Abhimanyu
- Joyeeta Goswami as Katha
- Anindita Bose as Sania
- Sudip Mukherjee as Master / Indrajeet roy
- Manoj Ojha as Anindya Mukherjee
- Mohua Haldar as Tanaya Mukherjee
- Swagata Mukherjee as Leela
- Anirban Bhattacharya as Minister Koushik Bhattacharya
- Supriyo Dutta as Ramen Sikdar
- Sandeep Dey as Dr. Kamalesh
- Niladri Lahiri as Commissioner Abinash
