= Falna (TV series) =

Indian Bengali television series

- Genre: Drama; Romance; Family; Magic
- Created by: Raj Chakraborty Productions
- Screenplay by: Sudip Pal
- Story by: Kajari
- Directed by: Victo
- Creative director: Raj Chakraborty
- Starring: Roshni Tanwi Bhattacharya; Dedojyoti Roy Chowdhury; Hiya Dey
- Opening theme: "Felna...Felna"
- Composer: Upali Chattopadhyay
- Country of origin: India
- Original language: Bengali
- No. of seasons: 1
- No. of episodes: 375

Production
- Executive producers: Souvik Bhattacharya, Rahul Datta and Debasree Dey (Raj Chakraborty Entertainment), Parijat Sarkar (Srijan Arts Pvt Ltd) and Reshmi Ray and Lagna Ghosh (Star Jalsha)
- Producers: Raj Chakraborty; Shyam Agarwal
- Cinematography: Samit Gupta
- Editors: Samali Chanda; Soma Ghosh
- Camera setup: Multi-camera
- Running time: 22 minutes
- Production company: Raj Chakraborty Productions

Original release
- Network: Star Jalsha
- Release: 1 March 2021 – 13 March 2022

Falna is an Indian Bengali romance drama fantasy television series that premiered on 1 March 2021 on Bengali General Entertainment Channel Star Jalsha, and is also available on the digital platform Disney+ Hotstar. The show is produced by Raj Chakraborty and Shyam Agarwal under the banner of Raj Srijan Arts LLP. It stars Debojyoti Roy Chowdhury, Roshni Tanwi Bhattacharya and Hiya Dey in lead roles. The show went off-air on 13 March 2022, due to low TRPs.

== Synopsis ==
Falna shows the journey of a little street child named Falna. She is a gifted magician and singer. Her mission is to find her mother and pursue her dream of becoming a well-known performer. The story revolves around Beni, who always aspired to become a magician like her father but is ridiculed for her ambition. Her father marries her off to a wealthy man from an orthodox family. The circumstances prevent her from pursuing her dream and she is forced to carry out her family duties and responsibilities. A godman she meets by chance, tells her that her daughter will get to fulfill her dreams. She gets concerned as she has a boy child. A twist in fate leads her to a young street magician named Falna, who reminds her of the dream she once nurtured. Who is Falna? Why does Beni feel strangely drawn towards her?

== Cast ==
=== Main ===
- Hiya Dey as Khela Banerjee / Falna - Beni and Manish's lost daughter, Anita's adoptive daughter, Beni's disciple
  - Meghan Chakraborty as first Falna before Replacement
- Roshni Tanwi Bhattacharya as Shruti Banarjee aka Beni- Manish's Wife, Falna's Mother
- Debojyoti Roy Chowdhury as Manish Banerjee - Falna's father, Rohan's adoptive father

=== Recurring ===
- Sumanta Mukherjee as Shibotosh Banerjee - Manish's father, a businessman
- Laboni Sarkar as Ashalata Banerjee aka Asha - Manish's mother
- Tamhagna Manna / Ayush Roy as Rohan - Beni's adoptive son, Anita's son
- Tanishka Tiwari as Tuktuki aka Rini : Fake Falna
- Reshmi Sen as Tarulata aka Taru - Manish's maternal aunt
- Saptarshi Roy as Prakash Sarkar - a magician, Beni's father
- Pushpita Mukherjee as Banani Sarkar - Beni's mother
- Gulshanara Khatun as Briospoti-Anita's neighborhood sister
- Chanda Chattopadhyay as Briospoti's mother-in-law
- Asmita Chakraborty as Tia - Manish's cousin
- Tanusree Goswami as Purvi Banerjee - Manish's younger paternal aunt
- Amlan Mazumder as Monotosh Banerjee- Purvi's husband, Rono's father, Shibotosh's younger brother
- Srishti Pandey as Tupur Banerjee - Manish's sister
- Kuyasha Biswas as Anita - Rohan's mother, Falna's adoptive mother
- Sudip Sarkar as Montu, Anita's husband
- Dola Chakraborty as Tuktuki's stepmother.
- Shamik Chakraborty as Ronodip Banerjee- Purvi's son
- Paromita Daw as Nayanika Banerjee - Rono's wife
- Manosi Das as Lali Banerjee - Rono and Nayanika's daughter
- Archika Gupta as Neha-Tintin's Lover
- Rupsa Chatterjee as Moon- Manish's fiancé, Avinash's ex-wife
- Chaitali Chakraborty as Swagata-Ashalata's friend, Moon's Mother
- Rumpa Chatterjee as Dola- Nayanika's mother and Lali's grandmother
- Sanghasri Sinha Mitra as Moonmoon- Nayanika's Aunt
- Krishna Roy as Dakshina - a maid
- Arijita Mukhopadhyay as Shoshikola- Khela's Orphanage's Aunt

=== Guest appearance ===
- Raj Chakraborty
