= SVF =

SVF or SvF can refer to:

- Serial Vector Format, used in boundary scan tests of electronics
- Shree Venkatesh Films, an Indian media and entertainment company headquartered in Kolkata, West Bengal
- Södra Vätterbygdens folkhögskola
- Squamish volcanic field
- State variable filter
- Stoicorum Veterum Fragmenta, a commonly cited philosophical reference, edited by Hans Friedrich August von Arnim
- Stromal vascular fraction
- SVF Foundation
