= Jamai 420 =

2015 Indian Bengali film by Ravi Kinagi

- First Look Poster
- Directed by: Ravi Kinagi
- Written by: Ravi Kinagi
- Produced by: Shrikant Mohta; Mahendra Soni; Nispal Singh
- Starring: Ankush Hazra; Hiran Chatterjee; Soham Chakraborty; Payel Sarkar; Mimi Chakraborty; Nusrat Jahan
- Cinematography: S.D. Jaan
- Music by: Dev Sen; Dabbu
- Production company: Shree Venkatesh Films
- Distributed by: Shree Venkatesh Films; Surinder Films
- Release date: 22 May 2015
- Running time: 138 minutes
- Country: India
- Language: Bengali

Jamai 420 (English: Son-in-law 420) is a Bengali language comedy-drama film written and directed by Ravi Kinagi, who was assisted by Pathikrit Basu. The film stars an ensemble cast, consisting of Soham Chakraborty, Hiran Chatterjee, Ankush Hazra, Payel Sarkar, Mimi Chakraborty and Nusrat Jahan in lead roles while Kharaj Mukherjee, Biswanath Basu, Shantilal Mukherjee and Manasi Sinha appear in other pivotal roles. The film was produced jointly by Shrikant Mohta, Mahendra Soni and Nispal Singh under Shree Venkatesh Films and Surinder Films respectively.

== Synopsis ==
The film is a comedy of errors in which three guys (Soham Chakraborty, Ankush Hazra and Hiran Chatterjee) land in Bangkok amidst a lot of confusion over their marriage with three girls (Mimi Chakraborty, Nusrat Jahan and Payel Sarkar). They are forced to do insane things in order to woo their lady loves, which leads to many humorous situations.

== Plot ==
Joy Chowdhury, a divorce lawyer, is in love with his assistant, Priyanka, who is also a lawyer. Joy's rival, Sumanta, also loves her. Sumanta always loses cases against Joy due to the latter's smartness, even failing to win Priyanka's heart; he's despised by his mother. Joy is always afraid of his father, Rajballabh, a retired C.J., when it comes to talking about his and Priyanka's marriage, frustrating Priyanka. Priyanka's father, Dhanakrishna, is a blind widower with strong senses. A land promoter, Raghab Roy, is friends with Rajballabh, and a palanquin supplier, Charandas. Bijoy, Charandas' son, loves Julie, whose brother, Potla Poda, is a gangster. But his father has fixed Bijoy's marriage with Tina, whose father, Raghab, is weak-hearted and suffers a stroke every three months. Tina loves Shaan, a dim-witted simpleton, and has objections to this marriage.

After arriving in Delhi and reaching Charandas' residence, Joy and his family learn that Bijoy has eloped with Julie, which Raghab's family also discovers. Therefore, Joy's father decides that the marriage should take place. While Bijoy marries Julie through a court marriage and succeeds, Tina doesn't, as she had to marry Joy instead, despite her plans to introduce Shaan as the groom. Sumanta also learns about their marriage through Chowki, Joy's family servant, telling this to Priyanka. Shaan and Priyanka learn about their marriage and start misunderstanding Joy and Tina. Shaan even resorts to self-destruction and lives an alcoholic life. Meanwhile, Julie's brother learns of his sister's elopement with Bijoy and their court marriage, leading to trouble for Bijoy. Even Bijoy's parents also disapprove of their marriage because of her religion and her family. After this, they flee to Bangkok.

Bijoy hatches a plan under the pretext of a honeymoon trip to Bangkok; Joy and Tina meet Shaan and Priyanka, respectively, clear their misunderstandings, and they cooperate in the plan before Joy's father can arrange a get-together. Sumanta learns of the couple's honeymoon, but witnessing them and Priyanka together, he sets out to uncover the truth. After reaching Bangkok, the three couples book respective rooms in a hotel. Living in different rooms, Bijoy, Joy, and Shaan argue with their lady loves regarding their marriages despite living together. Sumanta also lands in Bangkok and appears at the hotel, where the couples live, to find out about their relationship, as well as Julie's brother, who is here to find out about his sister's relationship. There are so many hilarious consequences and comedy of errors when the three men woo their lady loves, while Joy and Tina manage to hide their real relationships from their respective in-laws. Will Joy, Bijoy, and Tina be able to reclaim their love along with their families' approval?

== Cast ==
- Soham Chakraborty as Shaan
- Hiran Chatterjee as Bijoy Palkiwala
- Ankush Hazra as Joy Chowdhury
- Payel Sarkar as Julie Poda
- Mimi Chakraborty as Tina Roy
- Nusrat Jahan as Priyanka Dhali
- Biswajit Chakraborty as Charandas Palkiwala, Bijoy's father
- Shankar Chakraborty as Raghab Roy, Tina's father
- Kharaj Mukherjee as Rtd. C.J. Rajballabh Chowdhury, Joy's father
- Supriyo Dutta as Dhanakrishna Dhali, Priyanka's father
- Shantilal Mukherjee as Potla Poda, Julie's brother
- Biswanath Basu as Sumanta Bagdiwala
- Manasi Sinha as Priyambada Chowdhury, Joy's mother
- Tulika Basu as Parbati Palkiwala, Bijoy's mother
- Raj Chakraborty as himself (cameo)
- Sabyasachi Chakraborty as Narrator
- Meghna Halder as Tanuka Sen
- Anindita Saha as Late Bishnupriya Dhali, Priyanka's mother (portrait)
- Pallabi Mukherjee as Sumanta's mother

== Production ==
=== Development ===
Ravi Kinagi clarified it will be a commercial romantic comedy film which would bring together Ankush Hazra, Payel, Soham Chakraborty, Hiran, Mimi Chakraborty and Nusrat Jahan on the silver screen for the first time. Raj Chakraborty made a special appearance and joined the cast in Bangkok on 16 April, for shooting.

=== Marketing ===
The film's first poster starring the lead characters as well as the first song was uploaded on 3 May 2015.

== Soundtrack ==
Jamai 420

Soundtrack album
- Recorded: 2015
- Genre: Feature film soundtrack
- Language: Bengali
- Label: SVF
- Producers: Shrikant Mohta, Mahendra Soni, Nispal Singh

=== Track list ===
No.	Title	Lyrics	Music	Artist(s)	Length
1.	"Jamai 420 (Title Track)"	Prasenjit Mallick	Dev Sen	Prasenjit Mallick, Bob Stephen & Gopika Goswami	3:33
2.	"Oh Shona Miss You"	Prasenjit Mallick & Adhyan Dhara	Dev Sen	Prasenjit Mallick, Bob Stephen & Gopika Goswami	3:22
3.	"Dhichkiyaon"	Prasen	Dabbu	Satrujit, Ujjaini Mukherjee	3:34
Total length:					9:89

== Reception ==
=== Critical response ===
Upam Buzarbaruah of The Times of India reviewed "Now that we are done with the pleasantries, let's start a little dissection. First, acting. All the actors in the film have managed to take hamming to the next level. Kharaj Mukherjee, Shantilal Chakraborty, Supriyo Dutta, Biswajit Chakraborty and Shankar Chakraborty are right up there, at the top. The only non-hammers were the girls in the cast and Hiran, as Ankush, Soham leave no stone unturned to act as loud as possible. But I guess that's maybe because the director wouldn't settle for less. But the result was a hamfest, with each actor trying to out-overact the others. Music. Well, can't say it's bad; just run-of-the-mill commercial stuff that makes you shake a leg for a week or so before fading into oblivion."
