= Dadagiri Unlimited =

Bengali television quiz show on ZEE Bangla

- Logo
- Also known as: Dadagiri
- Genre: Quiz show
- Created by: Zee Bangla
- Directed by: Subhankar Chattopadhyay (2009–2022); Avijit Sen (2023–present)
- Presented by: Sourav Ganguly (2009–2011; 2013–2024); Mithun Chakraborty (2012–2013); Dev (2026–present)
- Opening theme: Dadagiri by Arijit Singh
- Country of origin: India
- Original language: Bengali
- No. of seasons: 11

Production
- Producer: Zee Bangla
- Running time: 90 minutes
- Production company: Zee Bangla Productions

Original release
- Network: Zee Bangla
- Release: July 27, 2009 – present

Dadagiri Unlimited is an Indian Bengali language quiz show. The programme has been airing on Zee Bangla since 2009. Sourav Ganguly, the former captain of the India national cricket team and former president of the Board of Control for Cricket in India, hosted the first two seasons. Actor Mithun Chakraborty replaced him in the third season, but Sourav continued hosting the show replacing Mithun from the fourth season onwards.

The contestants are chosen by a preliminary selection round held in different parts of the state West Bengal, and every contestant represents their respective districts of West Bengal. The show premiered on 27 July 2009. The title track has been penned by Srijit Mukherji. and sung by Arijit Singh.

On 20 December 2009, Kolkata won the finale (Bollywood actor Shah Rukh Khan was the celebrity guest in the finale episode of the first season); and in season 2, North 24 Parganas won. Dadagiri season 3 was organized on 20 October 2011 and ended on 3 June 2012. It was hosted by Mithun Chakraborty. The then undivided Bardhaman secured the trophy of Season 3.

Season 4 started on 26 August 2013 and ended on 23 February 2014. This season, the main host, Sourav hosted the show. In that season, North 24 Parganas secured the win for the second time. Bollywood personalities Farhan Akhtar and Vidya Balan were celebrity guests in the finale of season 4, who came to promote their film Shaadi Ke Side Effects. Season 5 started on 17 November 2014 and ended on 7 June 2015. Season 6 began on 11 January 2016 and ended on 3 July 2016. Season 7 began on 10 June 2017 and ended on 25 February 2018, Sachin Tendulkar made an appearance in the final. Season 8 started airing on 3 August 2019 and temporarily halted in March 2020 due to the lockdown measures taken to tackle the COVID-19 pandemic. After the lockdown, it started airing in late August 2020, ending with the Grand Finale which was aired on 13 September 2020. On 25 September 2021, this show was held with a brand new look as season 9. Their new slogan was "Haat barale bondhu hoy". This season was ended on 5 June 2022. Season 10 started on 6 October 2023 and season ended on 5 May 2024.

== Rounds ==
=== Selection ===
The contestants from 24 districts of West Bengal with Probasi Bangali (Expatriate District-for participants of West Bengal living outside the state) compete in this round. In season 7, the name 'Probasi' was replaced by 'Team India'. However, from season 8 onwards, the team was renamed as 'Prabasi'. In this round, 20 districts of West Bengal along with Probasi Bangali could play. They had to answer 6 questions by pressing buttons against the options. Normally the questions were a 'yes-no' type question, with two options- right and wrong. From each question, one player from a district could be selected for the following rounds. This new system was introduced in season 5.

In the previous seasons, all the participants had to answer one question with four options, from which the six fastest participants to answer, were selected.

In all, 6 participants could be selected from this round. The remaining 14 contestants could play by helping the 6 selected players in Power Play Round and Cover Drive Round, from the Runners' Bench.

As all the districts did not get equal chances to play the game and increase their score in the leaderboard, to give equal chances to all the districts to play the game, this round was dissolved from season 7 and now the districts are randomly picked to play the game giving chances to everyone by the makers in each episode.

In season 11, this round was revived and the rules are modified. Contestants will go for starter points and fight for three podiums, gold, silver and bronze. Three two-option based questions will be asked. The correct answerers will get points and podiums as per below. Other 3 contestants will get general podiums with no extra points.

Selection
Podium	Points
Gold	10
Silver	8
Bronze	6

=== Toss ===
Six selected contestants from 23 districts of West Bengal and a contestant representing Team India could participate in this round. Six clues were given for a single answer, from which the participants had to guess the answer.

From season 4, a seventh clue had been included, which was presented after the participants finalized their guess in the sixth clue from which the answer gets quite obvious. The participants' 'runs' are deducted if their guess is wrong, while they are awarded points if their guess is correct. The number of runs awarded or deducted depends on the number of clues the contestant used to finalize his/her guess. In the later seasons, this round has got tougher with the clue being vague and the answers unexpected.

In season 8, participants would need to write their guesses from the first clue but without telling anyone, which is revealed at the end before announcing the seventh clue i.e., the answer. If the 1st and 6th answer of the contestant is same and it is correct, the contestant wins 12 points.

In season 9, six contestants from 23 districts of West Bengal and a contestant representing Probashi can participate in this round. In this season, the writing of the first clue got removed, and the whole rule has changed. Dada will have a coin where Dadagiri logo will be head and 'Season 9' writing will be tail. If it is head, his right sided participants will answer the 2nd, 4th and 6th clue and left sided one will answer 1st, 3rd and 5th clue. If it is tail, his left sided participants will answer the 2nd, 4th and 6th clue and the right sided one will answer the 1st, 3rd and 5th clue.

From season 10, there were 5 clues.

Scoring

The contestant will get more points who finals the answer more quickly. For example, if someone answers in the 5th clue, he would get 2 points if correct and -2 if wrong. Similarly, for 4th clue it is 3 or -3 and so on. But if someone changes the answer in the middle and returns to the previous answer in the last clue, it would be considered that the one has locked his answer on the last clue. Like:

Clue number	Score
1	6 or -6
2	5 or -5
3	4 or -4
4	3 or -3
5	2 or -2
6	1 or -1
7	No answers can be given

None are eliminated.

=== Power Play ===
All six contestants play this round. Random questions of nine people were selected to ask the contestants. If they can answer without taking options, they get 12 runs. They can also select from questions valued two, four, or six runs if they wish. A two-run question includes two options, a four-run question has three options, while a six-run question has four options while a 12 run question has no options.

If any other contestant thinks that the contestant's answer is wrongfulness, he/she can challenge that particular contestant, receiving double runs if the answer is correct, but losing double runs if the answer is wrong. This thing can be done thrice- as challenge 1, 2 and 3.

In season 8, the participants had to answer the questions given by the people of Captain's Squad.

In season 9, there will be a question score selection spinner. Participants will have to answer based on the 2, 4, 6 and 12 runs wherever it lands on. But, if he gets 2, 4 or 6 runs question, he has a chance to upgrade the answer to 12 runs question. And also, Captain's Squad is removed in season 9 which means the participants can't take help from others.

One contestant is eliminated at the end of this round.

This round was renamed Packup or Panga in season 3 and Bouncer in the second half of season 7 giving importance to bowlers also with batsmen.

=== Cover Drive ===
Here, the contestants are given some audio-visual questions to answer. Questions range from one to four runs (score). The contestants are questioned, without options, on either a video or an audio clip, depending on their choice. The help and challenge options are also available here.

This round is quite similar to the Power Play round; only the question pattern is different.

In season 8, people could take help in this round from the Captain's Squad.

In season 9, there is a chance to flip the question to others. If that participant is correct, he gets double marks. If he can't, he gets negative marks in single. But, other participants can't flip the questions to the same person who got the flipped question. But, the person who flipped it, must have to answer another question for the same points. As the Captain's Squad is removed in this season, no one will be able to take help.

In season 3, it was named as Chaturanga.

This round is discontinued from season 11.

One contestant is eliminated.

=== Googly ===
The Googly round is quite similar to the type of bowling in cricket it is named after. As the bowler surprises the batsman with such a delivery, the contestants are also baffled by riddles or rebus puzzles. This is perhaps the hardest round in the game, but certainly the most enjoyable.

In season 8, each contestant could choose from googly and doosra. As a doosra question was more difficult, a contestant could get 12 points for the right answer and minus 12 points for the wrong answer. Actually a doosra question was an audio-visual googly. A googly question has six points. A contestant gets six points for the right answer and minus six points for the wrong answer. Others cannot challenge the contestant (who is asked the question) in this tricky round. No help is available in this round.

One contestant is eliminated.

Googly was renamed as Googly/Doosra round in season 8.

In season 9, Doosra got removed and got renamed as Googly again.

=== Bapi Bari Ja 1 ===
The remaining three contestants are asked 12 rapid fire questions with 2 options. Previously (before season 5) the number of questions was 18, the name of the round was "Slog Over"(before season 10). The fastest one to press the buzzer after the question is asked gets to answer the particular question. But if the contestant presses the buzzer during 'Dada' is asking the question, then he will, however, complete the question but not give the two options to him/her. One who manages to answer consecutive three questions correctly gets a 'free hit' which means that the participant will get a special opportunity that he/she will only answer the question to boost up their scores and getting it right will bring him/her 6 points but there will be no negative marking for him in the question. Questions that all the contestants have failed to answer are asked to the Runners' Bench at random.

If any contestant fails to give the correct answers or gives wrong answers to three consecutive questions, he/she cannot attempt the next question. That means, the next question is thrown among the other two contestants.

In season 9, the chance of getting points is higher in this round, as the system is, if the question no. is 1, then he will get 1 point, if it is 2, he will get 2 points. Here the 'free hit' is the value of the number of the question after the three consecutive correct answers. For example, if the participant gives consecutive correct answers to question numbers 3, 4, 5; so the value of the 'free hit' question is 6 points.

Later on in season 9, the number of questions are reduced to 6. The scoring system is:

Question	Marks
1	2
2	4
3	6
4	8
5	10
6	12

One contestant is eliminated.

In season 3, it was named as Quick or Quack. In the second half of season 7, this round was called Full Toss giving importance to bowlers also with batsmen.

This round is discontinued from season 11.

=== Bapi Bari Ja 2 ===
The remaining duo is head-to-head in this final obstacle to victory. The contestants are told to choose from six subjects alternatively, from which they will be asked questions. Similar to the Bouncer round, one can challenge the other. If they decide to challenge in this round, their answers are kept unknown to each other until they have finalized them.

In season 8, participant could take help from the Captain's Squad but the challenger could not.

In season 9, participant can choose how much runs they want for the question, it must be 6, 12, 18 or 24 points. If another challenges, he will get the points if he gets the correct answer and if he can't, he will negative markings. It is the same rule for the participant and the challenger in season 9. Taking help from Captain's Squad is no more available now. However, a 'Vaseline Clue' is given to the one who has the question. At first the challenger finalizes the answer then 'Dada' gives the one a help which aids to answer the question. Now each participant gets only one help in the whole round.

Later in season 9, the number of topics is reduced to 4 from 6. In a special episode, the 4 participants having the most number of points get their own questions 1 each. But everyone irrespective of greatest or least score can challenge the question.

Again, there will be a step up chance consisting of 4 and 6 runs question if any contestant reaches to 90 to 99 runs available from season 2.

The contestant who has scored more runs wins the game.

In season 3 'Bapi Bari Ja' round was renamed as 'Check Mate' round, in season 4 it was again named as 'Bapi Bari Ja'.

== Show Host ==
Sourav Ganguly, the legendary former captain of the Indian national cricket team, was the inaugural host when the show premiered in 2009. His engaging demeanor, natural flair for conversation, and ability to connect with contestants and audiences alike played a pivotal role in establishing Dadagiri Unlimited as a beloved television program. Ganguly continued to host the show until 2011, during which time it gained immense traction among viewers.

In 2012, veteran actor Mithun Chakraborty assumed the role of host. Ganguly made a highly anticipated return to the show in 2013. His second tenure as host, which lasted until 2024, reaffirmed his deep association with Dadagiri Unlimited and further strengthened its connection with audiences. Over the course of these years, Ganguly refined his approach, masterfully balancing intellect, humor, and competitive spirit, ensuring that the show maintained its prominence in Bengali television. His ability to create a dynamic and engaging environment played a crucial role in sustaining Dadagiri Unlimited as a top-rated quiz show for over a decade.

Dev took over as host of the show from Season 11 onwards.

== Season Overview ==
No.	Season	Year	Host	Winner	Ref.
1	Dadagiri Unlimited Season 1	2009	Sourav Ganguly	Kolkata	
2	Dadagiri Unlimited Season 2	2010-2011	Sourav Ganguly	North 24 Parganas	
3	Dadagiri Unlimited Season 3	2011-2012	Mithun Chakraborty	Bardhaman	
4	Dadagiri Unlimited Season 4	2013-2014	Sourav Ganguly	North 24 Parganas	
5	Dadagiri Unlimited Season 5	2014-2015	Sourav Ganguly	Bardhaman	
6	Dadagiri Unlimited Season 6	2016	Sourav Ganguly	Purba Medinipur	
7	Dadagiri Unlimited Season 7	2017-2018	Sourav Ganguly	North 24 Parganas	
8	Dadagiri Unlimited Season 8	2019-2020	Sourav Ganguly	Darjeeling	
9	Dadagiri Unlimited Season 9	2021-2022	Sourav Ganguly	Birbhum	
10	Dadagiri Unlimited Season 10	2023-2024	Sourav Ganguly	Hooghly	
11	Dadagiri Unlimited Season 11 Notun Banglar Notun Dadagiri	2026 - present	Dev		

== Winning districts ==
- Season 1 – Kolkata
- Season 2 – North 24 Parganas
- Season 3 – Bardhaman
- Season 4 – North 24 Parganas
- Season 5 – Bardhaman
- Season 6 – East Midnapore
- Season 7 – North 24 Parganas
- Season 8 – Darjeeling
- Season 9 – Birbhum
- Season 10 – Hooghly

== Chief Guests in Season Finales ==
- Season 1 – Shah Rukh Khan
- Season 2 – Prosenjit Chatterjee, Jeet & Mithun Chakraborty
- Season 3 – Alka Yagnik & Udit Narayan
- Season 4 – Farhan Akhtar, Vidya Balan, Prosenjit Chatterjee & Rachana Banerjee
- Season 5 – Bipasha Basu, Monali Thakur & Palash Sen
- Season 6 – Ankush Hazra, Mimi Chakraborty, Nusrat Jahan, Sayantika Banerjee & Jeet
- Season 7 – Sachin Tendulkar
- Season 8 – Raghab Chattopadhyay, Manomoy Bhattacharya, Upal Sengupta, Anindya Chatterjee, Anupam Roy, Mir Afsar Ali, Rupankar Bagchi, Somlata Acharyya Chowdhury & Monami Ghosh
- Season 9 – Dona Ganguly, Prosenjit Chatterjee, Rupam Islam, Soumitrisha Kundu, Anwesha Hazra, Shweta Bhattacharya, Rubel Das, Biswanath Basu, Kanchan Mullick, Ditipriya Roy, Raghab Chattopadhyay, Somlata Acharyya Chowdhury, Iman Chakraborty, Manomoy Bhattacharya, Jojo, Yash Dasgupta & Nusrat Jahan
- Season 10 – Sukhwinder Singh, Ankita Bhattacharyya, Ishaa Saha, Suhotro Mukhopadhyay, Sourav Das, Dona Ganguly, Albert Kabo, Arkodeep Mishra, Megha Daw & Priyanka Bysach

== Adaptations ==
Language	Title	Original release	Network(s)	Last aired	Notes	Current Hosts
Punjabi	Punjabiyan Di Dadagiri With Bhajji ਪੰਜਾਬੀਅਨ ਦੀ ਦਾਦਾਗਿਰੀ	4 September 2021	Zee Punjabi	8 January 2022	Remake	Harbhajan Singh
Odia	Dadagiri Hrudayaru ଦାଦାଗିରି ହୃଦୟରୁ	15 January 2022	Zee Sarthak	10 April 2022	Remake	Anubhav Mohanty
Odia	Pratibhara Dadagiri ପ୍ରତିଭାର ଦାଦାଗିରି	16 April 2022	Zee Sarthak	5 June 2022	Remake	Siddhanta Mahapatra

== Ratings ==
Week	Year	BARC Viewership	
Week	Year	TRP	Rank
Week 13	2020	2.5	1
Week 21	2020	1.0	1
