= Subhankar Chattopadhyay =

Indian director and producer

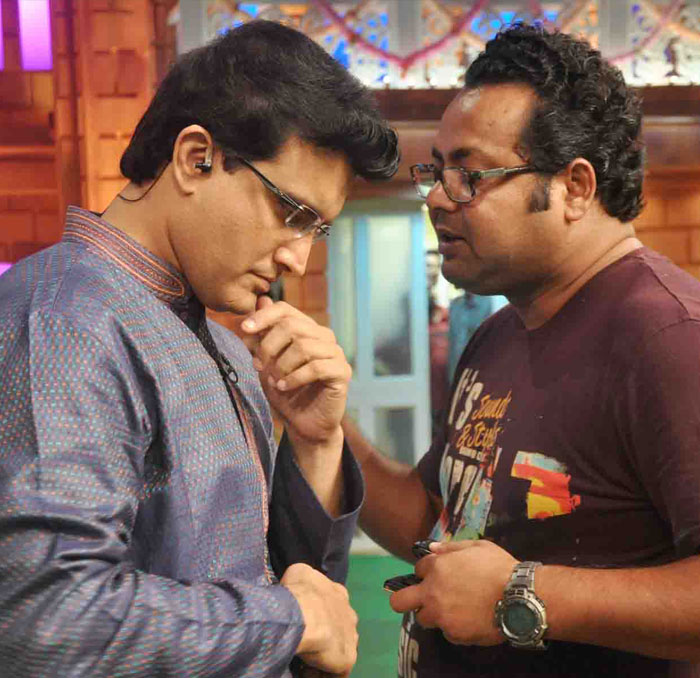
- Chattopadhyay with Sourav Ganguly, on the sets of Dadagiri Unlimited
- Born: Baruipur, South 24 Parganas, India
- Occupations: Film director; Reality show director; Producer

Subhankar Chattopadhyay is an Indian director, scriptwriter, content creator and producer. He primarily directs non-fiction television shows in Tollywood. He is best known for directing the television shows Dadagiri Unlimited, Dance Bangla Dance and Mirakkel.

He made his feature film directorial debut with Haanda & Bhonda (2010), starring Mithun Chakraborty. In 2019, the Super Singer Junior finale was broadcast for 10 hours continuously. In 2020, a 10-hour audition programme was held for Super Singer.

During the COVID-19 pandemic in India, Chattopadhyay directed Super Singer using a remote production format. Participants, hosts and jury members recorded their respective portions using mobile phones from their homes.

== Life and early career ==
Chattopadhyay was born at Baruipur, South 24 Parganas in West Bengal. He studied at Baruipur High School and graduated from the City College, Kolkata. He began his career by writing for Little Magazine. He later worked as an executive producer at Zee Bangla for several years before directing non-fiction television programmes.

== Television ==
Reality show	Director	Producer	Executive Producer	Network
Mirakkel	Yes	Yes	Yes	Zee Bangla
Dance Bangla Dance	Yes	No	Yes	Zee Bangla
Dadagiri Unlimited	Yes	No	No	Zee Bangla
Star of Bengal	Yes	No	No	Zee Bangla
Ke Hobe Biggest Fan	Yes	No	No	Zee Bangla
Banglar Shera Poribar	Yes	No	No	Zee Bangla
Apur Sangsar	Yes	No	No	Zee Bangla
Detective 2015	Yes	Yes	No	Zee Bangla
Kotha O Kahini	Yes	No	No	Star Jalsha
Bhyabachaka	Yes	No	No	Star Jalsha
Amra Na Ora	Yes	No	No	Star Jalsha
Amar Bor Superstar	Yes	No	No	Star Jalsha
Ebar Jombe Moja	Yes	Yes	No	Star Jalsha
Super Singer Junior	Yes	Yes	No	Star Jalsha
Dance Dance Junior	Yes	Yes	No	Star Jalsha
Super Singer	Yes	Yes	No	Star Jalsha
Singing Star	Yes	No	No	Ruposhi Bangla
Bindass Dance	Yes	Yes	No	Colors Bangla
Abbulish	Yes	No	No	Colors Bangla
Rannaghore Rockstar	Yes	Yes	No	Colors Bangla
Gaaner Gunto	Yes	Yes	No	Colors Bangla
Pratibhara Dadagiri	Yes	No	No	Zee Sarthak

== Web series ==
Year	Web series	Director	Screenwriter	Producer	OTT Platform	Language	Notes	Ref.
2020	Case Jaundice	Yes	Yes	Yes	Hoichoi	Bengali	Marked his OTT directorial debut	

== Filmography ==
Year	Film	Director	Screenwriter	Language	Notes	Ref.
2010	Handa and Bhonda	Yes	No	Bengali	Marked his feature film directorial debut	
2025	Pataligunjer Putul Khela	Yes	No	Bengali		

== Television and cultural events ==
Event	Director	Producer	Notes
Mohabijoyer Mohanayok	Yes	No	Organized to celebrate the 50th anniversary of Bangladesh's independence and the centenary of the birth of Sheikh Mujibur Rahman
Mirchi Music Awards Bangla	Yes	No	
Joyo Hey	Yes	No	Organized to celebrate the efforts of the Kolkata Police
Platinum Pancham	Yes	No	Organized to mark the 75th birth anniversary of R.D. Burman
Jalsha Doshe Dosh	Yes	Yes	Organized to mark the tenth anniversary of Star Jalsha
Zee Bangla Gourab Sonman	Yes	No	
Star Jalsha Poribar Awards	Yes	No	
Bangla Cine Carnival	Yes	No	Held in Thailand to mark the centenary of Bengali cinema
Telly Academy Awards	Yes	No	
Gaan Priti	Yes	No	Streamed on Hoichoi

== Literary works ==
Besides his film and television work, Chattopadhyay has also written various literary pieces for several years. His work has been published multiple times in the magazine Desh. Between 2000–2003, his works Tobu J Ami Jiggasha Chinho and Prem Porjoton Phaad were published. He also worked as the editor for the magazine Poddyo Chorcha.
