= Raj Chakraborty =

Indian director, producer, politician

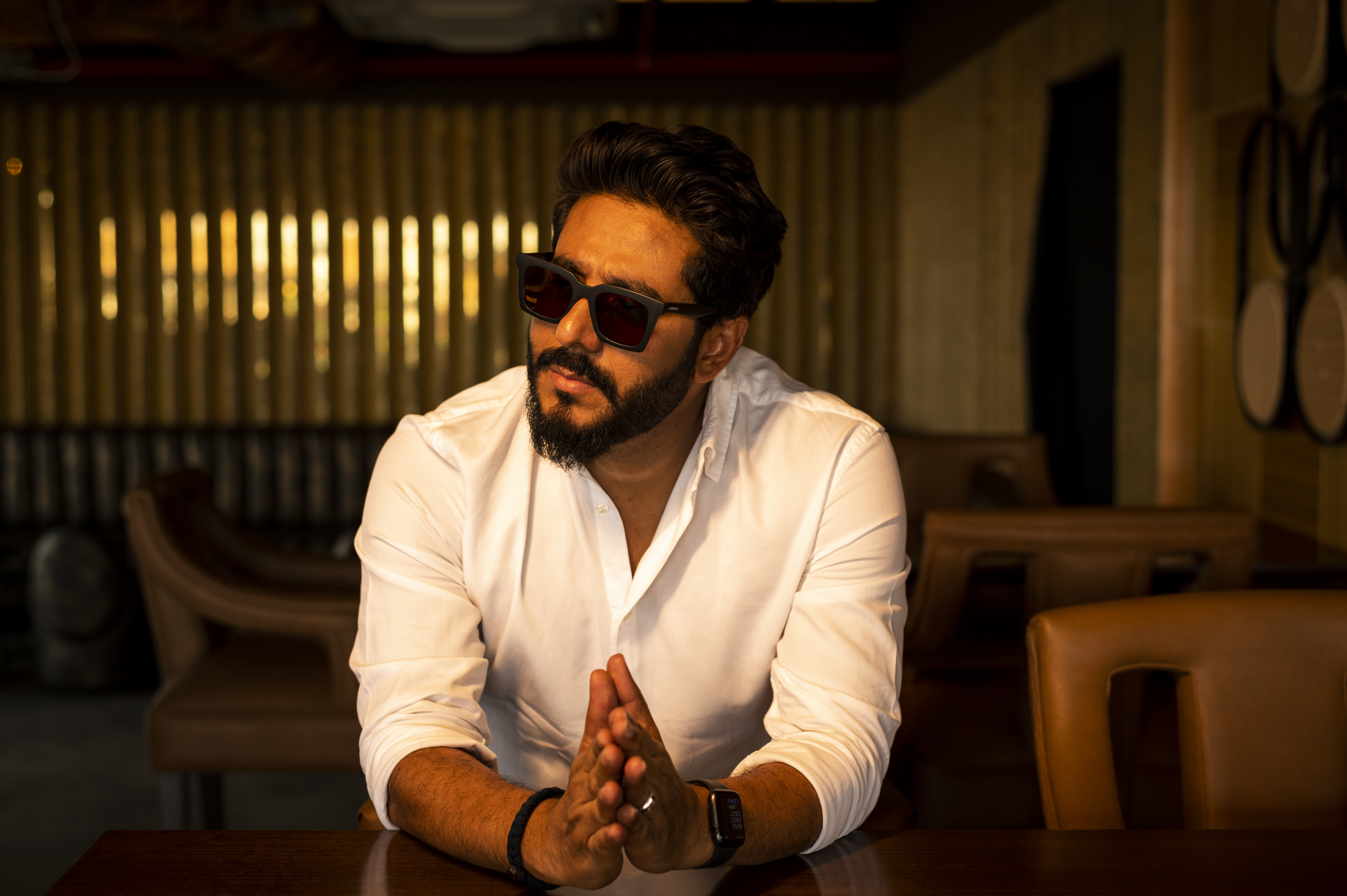
- Chakraborty in 2022

Member of the West Bengal Legislative Assembly
- In office 2 May 2021 – 4 May 2026
- Preceded by: Silbhadra Dutta
- Succeeded by: Kaustuv Bagchi
- Constituency: Barrackpur
- Born: 21 February 1975 (age 51); Halisahar, West Bengal, India
- Education: West Bengal State University
- Occupations: Film director, actor, producer
- Years active: 2008–present
- Notable work: Chirodini Tumi Je Amar; Challenge; Dui Prithibi; Prem Aamar; Proloy; Bojhena Shey Bojhena; Parineeta
- Political party: All India Trinamool Congress (till 2026)
- Spouses: Shatabdi Mitra (m. 2006–2011) Subhashree Ganguly (m. 2018)
- Children: Yuvaan Yaalini

Raj Chakraborty (born 21 February 1975) is an Indian film director, actor, producer and politician. He is one of the most commercially successful film-makers in Tollywood. Before directing his debut film, he was busy in Bengali TV. Raj Chakraborty was associated with Zee Bangla's laughter show Mirakkel, hosted by Mir, and the dance competition Dance Bangla Dance, judged by Mithun Chakraborty, during their initial days. He also directed Star Jalsha's laughter programme I Laugh You. He was a Member of Legislative Assembly of West Bengal from Barrackpore from 2021 to 2026.

== Early life ==
Chakraborty graduated from Rishi Bankim Chandra Colleges, Naihati which is affiliated with West Bengal State University. He worked backstage for various theatre productions between 1993 and 1995 in his locality. After graduating, Chakraborty left his home and moved to Belgachia to start his career in acting. In 1996, Chakraborty moved to Netaji Nagar, Kolkata.

== Filmography ==
=== As director ===
Key
†	Denotes films that have not yet been released

Year	Title	Producer	Notes
2008	Chirodini Tumi Je Aamar	Shree Venkatesh Films	Debut film; Based on Rizwanur-Priyanka controversy (2007)
2009	Challenge	Shree Venkatesh Films	
2009	Prem Aamar	Shree Venkatesh Films	remake of the Tamil-Telugu bilingual blockbuster film 7G Rainbow Colony.
2010	Le Chakka	Srijan Arts	
2010	Dui Prithibi	Shree Venkatesh Films	remake of 2008 Telugu movie Gamyam
2011	Shotru	Eskay Movies	Remake of Tamil movie Singam (2010)
2012	Bojhena Shey Bojhena	Shree Venkatesh Films	
2013	Kanamachi	Eskay Movies	remake of 2011 Tamil film Ko
2013	Proloy	Shree Venkatesh Films; Raj Chakraborty Entertainment Productions	A felicitation to Barun Biswas
2014	Borbaad	Shree Venkatesh Films	remake of Tamil film Polladavan (2007) while the romance between Bonny and Rittika is inspired from another Tamil film Sullan (2004).
2014	Yoddha	Shree Venkatesh Films	remake of 2009 Telugu film Magadheera.
2015	Parbona Ami Chartey Tokey	Shree Venkatesh Films; Surinder Films	remake of the 2013 Telugu film Uyyala Jampala
2015	Katmundu	GreenTouch Entertainment	
2016	Abhimaan	Reliance Entertainment; Grassroot Entertainment; Walzen Media Works	remake of the 2013 Telugu film, Attarintiki Daredi (2013)
2017	Chaamp	Dev Entertainment Ventures	Based on Moti Nandi's novel Shibar Phire Asha
2017	Bolo Dugga Maiki	SVF Entertainment	
2018	Adventures of Jojo	SVF Entertainment	
2019	Shesh Theke Shuru	Jeetz Filmworks Pvt. Ltd.	Adapted from the novel Water & Fire
2019	Parineeta	Raj Chakraborty Entertainment Productions	Inspired from true events
2022	Habji Gabji	Raj Chakraborty Entertainment Productions	Adapted from Promoda Ranjan Roy's Boner Khobor
2022	Dharmajuddha	Raj Chakraborty Entertainment Productions	Based on Syed Mustafa Siraj's short story
2024	Babli	Raj Chakraborty Entertainment Productions	Based on Buddhadeb Guha's novel Babli
2024	Shontaan	Shree Venkatesh Films	
2026	Hok Kolorob	Raj Chakraborty Entertainment Productions	Inspired by 2014 Jadavpur University protests and 2023 Jadavpur University ragging case, also story writer

=== As actor ===
Year	Film	Role
2000	Apan Holo Par	Cameo
2008	Chirodini Tumi Je Amar	Cameo
2009	Challenge	Cameo
2009	Prem Aamar	Cameo
2012	Hemlock Society	Sethu Venkatraman
2012	Challenge 2	Cameo
2012	Bojhena Shey Bojhena	Cameo
2015	Jamai 420	Himself
2015	Parbona Ami Chartey Tokey	Cameo
2017	Chaamp	Cameo
2017	Cockpit	Shanu Ghosal
2018	Uma	Cameo
2022	Kolkatar Harry	Cameo

=== As producer ===
Year	Film	Note
2013	Proloy	
2018	Noor Jahaan	Indo-Bangladesh joint venture film. The film is a remake of 2008 Telugu movie Gamyam
2019	Prem Amar 2	Indo-Bangladesh joint venture film.
2019	Parineeta	
2022	Dharmajuddha	
2022	Habji Gabji	
2024	Babli	

== Accolades ==
Award name	Year	Category	Movie	Result
Anandalok Awards	2008	Best Director	Chirodini Tumi Je Amar	Won
Anandalok Awards	2009	Best Director	Challenge	Won
Anandalok Awards	2010	Best Director	Le Chakka	Won
Anandalok Awards	2011	Best Director	Shotru	Won
Tele Cine Awards	2012	Best Director	Bojhena Shey Bojhena	Won
BFJA Awards	2013	Best Promising Director	Bojhena Shey Bojhena	Won
BFJA Awards	2020	Best Director	Parineeta	Won

== Television ==
Raj Chakraborty produced the television serial Kanamachi, which was aired on Star Jalsha. For Zee Bangla, Raj Chakraborty Productions made the popular soap opera Raage Anuraage. He returned as director of his very own show I Laugh You, a show he had started in its first season. I Laugh You was a very popular laughter programme in the Indian regional television world, which was aired on Star Jalsha. Raj Chakraborty's association with another very popular Bengali entertainment channel Colors Bangla occurred with him producing the soap opera Kajallata for that channel.

=== As producer in television ===
==== Series ====
- Proloy Asche (Directed for Sananda TV produced by ABP)
- Nayika (Directed for Sananda TV produced by ABP)
- Josh (On Sananda TV produced by ABP)
- Kanamachi (On Star Jalsha)
- Raage Anuraage (On Zee Bangla)
- Kajallata (On Colors Bangla)
- Bedini Moluar Kotha (On Zee Bangla)
- Falna (On Star Jalsha)
- Sangeet er Mahajuddha (On Colors Bangla) (Also Director)
- Godhuli Alap (On Star Jalsha)
- Grihoprobesh (On Star Jalsha)
- Pratigga (On Star Jalsha)
- Ashirbad (On Star Jalsha)

==== Telefilms As Producer ====
- Dev I Love You
- Nimki Phulki
- Guti Mallar
- Dum Dum Digha Digha (Sequel of Guti Mallar)
- Guti Mallarer Athithi (Sequel of Guti Mallar and Dum Dum Digha Digha)
- Nimki Phulki 2 (Sequel of Nimki Phulki)-produced and directed by Abhimanyu Mukherjee

== Political career ==
He has recently joined Trinamool Congress in the hands of leader Mamata Banerjee. Later on 5 March 2021, Trinamool Congress leaders announced Chakraborty to be contesting this 2021 West Bengal Legislative Assembly Elections from Barrackpore. He won on 2 May 2021. In 2026 West Bengal Legislative Assembly election, he was defeated by Kaustuv Bagchi of the Bharatiya Janata Party.

== See also ==
- Tarun Majumdar
- Birsa Dasgupta
