= Films and Frames Digital Film Awards =

Annual film awards in India

- Country: India
- Presented by: Films and Frames (Neil Roy & Tanmoy Banerjee)
- First award: 10 July 2020
- Website: FAFDA

Films and Frames Digital Film Awards, popularly known as FAFDA are awards to reward artistic and technical merit in the Bengali Film Industry. The concept of a regional digital awards was conceived during the COVID-19 pandemic which began during the summer of 2020, forcing both artists and audiences into isolation, hence the entire award show was shot indoors by either the artists themselves or by the FAFDA crew.

== History ==
Films and Frames Digital Film Awards started off with the Chinese social media platform Helo from the house of ByteDance Ltd as its title partner and the award show was subsequently re-branded to Helo Films and Frames Digital Film Awards. Since the mid of June 2020 however, tensions started escalating between India and China at the border between the two nations. Under section 69A of the information technology act, the Indian Ministry of Information Technology identified 54 Chinese apps, Helo being one of them which threatened the ‘sovereignty’ of India. Following this development, Films and Frames with immediate effect terminated its partnership with Helo. On 12 June 2020, actress Srabanti Chatterjee launched the logo of FAFDA 2020. To make the content social media appropriate and viewable on a smartphone, for the first time an entire award show was shot in a vertical 9:16 format and aired as episodic content, over a period of 10 days. The first episode premiered on 10 July 2020 on Facebook Watch.

== Awards ==
Viewer's choice

- Best Film
- Best Actor
- Best Actress
- Best Playback Male
- Best Playback Female
- Best Music Director
- Best Director
- Best Song
- Best Actor in a Negative Role

Critics choice

- Best Film
- Best Actor
- Best Actress
- Best Supporting Actor
- Best Supporting Actress
- Best Director

Jury's choice

- Best Actor
- Best Actress
- Trendsetting Performance of the Year - Male
- Trendsetting Performance of the Year - Female
- Best Film
- Best Director
- Best Supporting Actor
- Best Supporting Actress
- Best Actor in a Negative Role
- Most Promising Talent (Tapash Pal Memorial Award)
- New Age Woman of The Year
- Best Music Director
- Song of the Year
- Diva of the Decade – (Supriya Devi Memorial Award)
- Best Screenplay
- Best Cinematographer
- Best Playback
- Best Actor in a Comic Role
- Best Lyrics
- Best Production Designer
- Best Make Up
- Best Sound Designer
- Best Editor
- OTT Promising Face
- Hotshot Director of the Year
- Most Distinguished Performance in a Character Role
