= Himanshu Dhanuka =

Bengali film Producer and Distributor

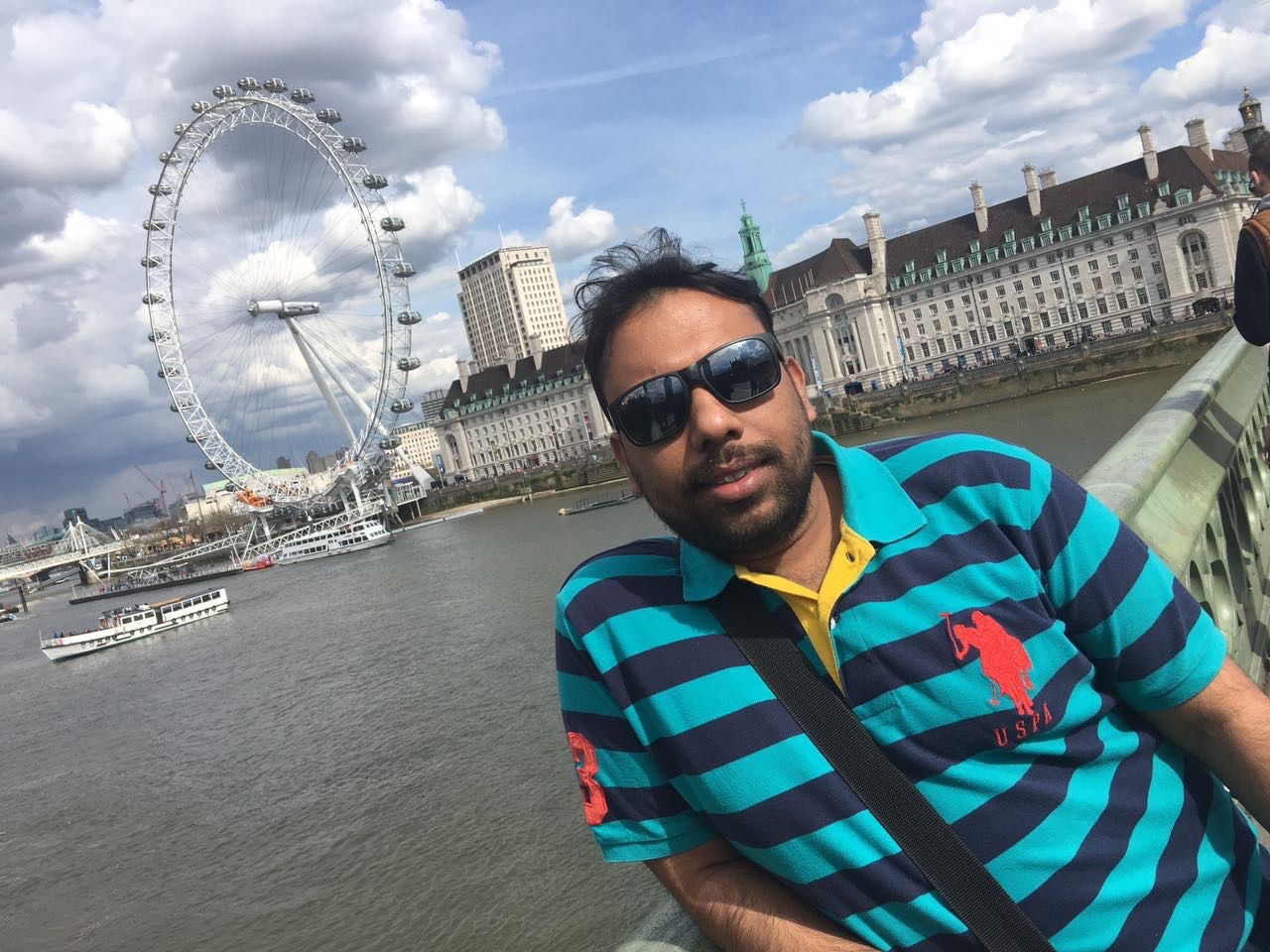
- Dhanuka at Westminster Bridge
- Occupation: Producer
- Spouse: Shristy Tibrewal
- Father: Ashok Dhanuka

Himanshu Dhanuka is an Indian film producer and distributor. Himanshu is the head of Eskay Movies.

== Personal life ==
Himanshu, the elder son of producer and distributor Ashok Dhanuka. He completed his graduation in Mechanical Engineering from National Institute of Technology. Kurukshetra. He married Shristy Tibrewal in the month of October, 2013.

== Career ==
Himanshu started his career at the young age of 23 as a producer along with his father, Ashok Dhanuka on films like Bhalobasha Bhalobasha(2008), Dujone (2009), Wanted (2010), Khiladi (2013) and many others. Bhalobasha Bhalobasha remained as the first Bengali film which was shot outside Asia and South East Asia, the film was one of the highest grossing Bengali films in 2008. Himanshu then produced films like Khokababu, Ami Sudhu Cheyechi Tomay Romeo vs Juliet, Khoka 420, Shotru, Badshah the Don, and Shikari.

== Filmography ==
- Tui Sudhu Amar (2018)
- Doob: No Bed of Roses (2017)
- The Bongs Again (2017)
- Prem Ki Bujhini (2016)
- Badsha The Don (2016)
- Kiriti Roy (2016)
- Hero 420 (2016)
- Shikari (2016)
- Aashiqui (2015)
- Romeo vs Juliet (2015)
- Ami Shudhu Cheyechi Tomay (2014)
- Khiladi (2013)
- Kanamachi (2013)
- Khoka 420 (2013)
- Khokababu (2012)
- Idiot (2012)
- Shotru (2011)
- Wanted (2010)
