= Ami Shudhu Cheyechi Tomay =

2014 Indian Bengali-language film

- Theatrical release poster
- Directed by: Ashok Pati; Anonno Mamun
- Screenplay by: Pele Bhattacharyaa
- Story by: Sukumar
- Produced by: Ashok Dhanuka; Himanshu Dhanuka
- Starring: Ankush Hazra; Subhashree Ganguly; Vikram Chatterjee; Misha Sawdagor; Don; Supriyo Dutta
- Cinematography: Kumud Verma
- Edited by: M. Susmit
- Music by: Savvy; Hridoy Khan; Akassh
- Production company: Eskay Movies
- Distributed by: Eskay Movies (India); Action Cut Entertainment (Bangladesh)
- Release date: 16 May 2014
- Running time: 135 minutes
- Countries: India; Bangladesh
- Language: Bengali

Ami Shudhu Cheyechi Tomay (transl. I Only Wanted You) is a 2014 Indo-Bangladesh joint production Bengali-language romantic action film directed by Ashok Pati and Anonno Mamun and produced by Ashok Dhanuka under the banner of Eskay Movies. The film was co-produced by Action Cut Entertainment. The film features Bengali actors Ankush Hazra, Subhashree Ganguly and Vikram Chatterjee in the lead roles. It is a co-production of India and Bangladesh. The music for the film was composed by Savvy Gupta, Hridoy Khan and Akassh.

This was the fourth collaboration between Ankush and Eskay Movies, after Idiot, Kanamachi, and Khiladi. This was the third collaboration between Subhasree and Eskay Movies, after Khokababu and Khoka 420. This is also Ankush and Subhasree's first Indo-Bangladeshi joint venture film.

== Plot ==
The film follows Abhijeet “Abhi”, who has been in love with Bhoomi since childhood. Abhi is a lonely and depressed child, having a father who cannot spend time with him due to work and his mother had passed away when he was very small. Wanting to make a friend, Abhi discards some chewed gum on a flight of stairs and decides that whoever steps on it, will be his friend. Bhoomi steps on the gum, prompting Abhi to try and befriend her, but to no avail, though he is persistent. After seeing Bhoomi be scolded by a teacher, he seeks revenge on her behalf. Abhi’s teacher, already concerned for his mental health, suspends Abhi - but Abhi’s father and him are already moving away to Kolkata because of his father’s work.

12 years later, Bhoomi moves from Bangladesh to Darjeeling to study Psychology at St. Joseph’s College - Abhi convinces his father to get him in as well, promising to be a perfect student despite having a poor performance record previously. Abhi is idealized at the college as ‘Mr. Perfect’ having earned the name from being an all-rounder at school and for displaying modesty and respect for women. Bhoomi tries to speak to Abhi out of curiosity as to who he is, though Abhi ends up kissing her. Later, Abhi whistles a tune from their childhood - Bhoomi realizes who he is and having disliked him since their school days, tells him that she still hates him and they both walk away.

A series of events happen where Abhi follows Bhoomi around, but every attempt at telling others about it results in her being comedically dismissed as experiencing stages of ‘hallucination’ - after yet another failed attempt at exposing his true nature of being an avid smoker and drinker with a bad temper, she tells him that she will reciprocrate his feelings if he confesses to everyone who he really is, including a love letter that he had sent anonymously. Abhi accepts and does as is asked and asks her if she finally loves him, but as Bhoomi’s friend, Joy, walks in, she takes the rose from Abhi and gives it to Joy and says ‘I love you’ to the latter instead. Joy had previously asked Abhi to leave Bhoomi alone, as he desires Bhoomi himself - Abhi tells him that he will sacrifice his own love for Bhoomi if she loves Joy back. Later, Bhoomi thanks Joy for not saying anything, even if he knows she doesn’t love him - but Joy confesses his own love for her, though he expresses that he fears Abhi’s wrath and then decides to stage an injury and breaks his own car, falsely accusing Abhi of having harmed him. Enraged, Bhoomi harshly rejects Abhi and tells Joy that she loves him and the two start a relationship, Abhi is heartbroken.

Afterwards, Joy attacks Abhi and nearly falls to his death, but Abhi saves him due to his own promise from earlier. Joy receives a phone call from Bhoomi, and she tells him that her father had found out about their relationship and is deciding to marry her off to the son of the enemy ruling family. Abhi decides to help Joy and Bhoomi reunite and sets out to Bangladesh and arrives in Pratapgarh, Bhoomi’s home village. Bhoomi’s family easily accepts Abhi and are hospitable towards him, though having been hostile at first, and they prepare for her wedding. Later on, when a misunderstanding occurs between Bhoomi’s family and the Talukdar family, after their pet dog is believed to have been poisoned. But the Talukdar son is infatuated with Bhoomi and they decide to take Bhoomi hostage instead. Bhoomi is rescued by Abhi, but Bhoomi’s father panics and decides to marry her off to anyone who wants to, though many reject the offer. Abhi steps in, and marries her in a traditional Muslim ceremony, doing so to protect her honor and cement the father’s trust in him. In the morning after their wedding, Abhi finally reunites Joy and Bhoomi, but they are caught together and Joy is beaten up by Pratap’s goons. Abhi lies and says that Joy is his bestfriend and is here as a guest, they apologize to Joy and he comes home with them - but Joy is becoming increasingly jealous. Later, the three board the train to return to West Bengal, but Joy is nowhere to be found. Bhoomi’s father finds Abhi’s diary and returns it to Abhi, showing that he knows about their deeper plans. He kidnaps the Talukar son and leaves Bhoomi with the Talukdar family in exchange for Joy from Bhoomi’s father. Though he also wins the heart of the Talukdar son during this, using both of their unrequited loves for Bhoomi to bond. Joy is freed and then him, Bhoomi and Abhi flee.

Abhi tries to cope by returning to his addictions while watching a recorded of their wedding. Abhi tells Bhoomi that he will tell Pratap about everything that has happened and plans to take the blame on himself, as he feels that he has betrayed the only man who has trusted and accepted him, unlike Bhoomi or his parents. Abhi takes a seemingly big dose of sleeping pills and then asks Bhoomi if she loves him, but dozes off before she is able to answer. The next day, as Bhoomi and Joy prepare to leave, Bhoomi reveals that she has called her father to come and talk with the three of them. Joy gets furious at her. When Pratap arrives with his goons, they beat Joy up once again, but Abhi is able to wake up in time and save him and takes the beating by Pratap. Joy is shown to be impatient, rude and aggressive towards Bhoomi, demanding that she says ‘Talak’ three times in order to divorce Abhi, but when she hesitates, Joy berates her. Pratap is angered by Joy’s actions and stabs bim, but Abhi stands in the way and gets stabbed instead. Joy tells Bhoomi to leave with him immediately and is shown to hold no remorse or guilt, but Bhoomi refuses and runs to Abhi.

Abhi is critically injured and has a thread on his wrist, something given to him earlier by Bhoomi’s grandmother to ensure his longevity and that it is to be tied around his wrist five times. Bhoomi ties the thread around his wrist twice, as it had already been tied three times before but was left uncompleted. Abhi survives and whistles the same tune again. Bhoomi begins to whistle along for the first time and then introduces herself as his lover. The film ends with them together.

== Cast ==
- Ankush Hazra as Abhijeet Khan / Abhi
  - Rafin Iqbal Kaif as Little Abhijeet
- Subhashree Ganguly as Bhoomi
  - Shrosta Sarkar Sithi as Little Bhoomi
- Vikram Chatterjee as Joy
- Misha Sawdagor as Pratap Chowdhury, Bhoomi's father
- Supriyo Dutta as Talukdar
- Kharaj Mukherjee as college principal
- Shanta Islam
- Shakuntala Barua
- Don
- Maliha Nusrat as Imonrag/ Imon / Joy's girlfriend
- Meghla Mukta
- Mahamuh Alam Kochi
- Pijush Bandyopadhyay
- Sanjit Mahato
- Naznin Alam
- Pathorokhi Chakraborty
- Rahmat Ali

== Soundtrack ==
The soundtrack of the film was composed by Savvy Gupta and Akassh Sen from India and by Hridoy Khan from Bangladesh..The title track of the film was written by Saurav Bhadra.

The soundtrack was released in India on 1 January 2014 and in Bangladesh on 20 April 2015.

Both the India and Bangladesh releases of the soundtrack contain the same songs, but the order of the tracks differ.

The song "Obujh Bhalobasha" by Hridoy Khan is a new version of the song of the same name from Khan's 2009 album Bolna.

== Release ==
The film was released on 16 May 2014.

=== Critical reception ===
The Times of India praised director Ashok Pati for being visually treat and keeping the story together, but also criticized some scenes in the middle for being mindless and yawning. Calling the film and out-and-out entertainer, the review gave the film 3/5 stars.
