= Chandrabindoo (film) =

2025 Indian Bengali film

- Campaign poster
- চন্দ্রবিন্দু
- Directed by: Raja Chanda
- Screenplay by: Aditya Sengupta (also dialogues)
- Story by: Raja Chanda; Aditya Sengupta
- Produced by: Ashok Dhanuka; Himanshu Dhanuka
- Starring: Ankush Hazra; Oindrila Sen
- Cinematography: Soumya Deepta Gin
- Edited by: Shubhajit Singh
- Music by: Anupam Roy
- Production company: Eskay Movies
- Release date: 23 May 2025
- Running time: 126 Minutes
- Country: India
- Language: Bengali

Chandrabindoo is a 2025 Indian Bengali-language supernatural drama film. It is produced by Ashok Dhanuka and Himanshu Dhanuka under the banner of Eskay Movies with story co-written and directed by Raja Chanda. The screenplay and dialogues were written by Aditya Sengupta. The lead roles are played by Ankush Hazra and Oindrila Sen. The supporting cast includes Tulika Basu, Shantilal Mukherjee, Anirban Chakrabarti, and Saheb Bhattacharya.

The film is edited by Subhajit Singha with cinematography by Soumyadipta Guin. The music is composed by Anupam Roy.

== Summary ==
Arnab Martin lives in a small house in East London with his Bengali-Christian parents, Ananta and Parvati. Together, the family runs a quaint bookstore called “Bookworm” in the heart of London. Arnab dreams of becoming a writer, and his greatest wish is to make his parents proud.

== Cast ==
- Ankush Hazra as Arnab Martin
- Oindrila Sen as Meera
- Shantilal Mukherjee as Ananta Martin
- Tulika Bose as Parbati Martin
- Anirban Chakrabarti as Pareswar Mitra aka Uncle Paw
- Saheb Bhattacharya as Sanjay
- Amandeep

== Release ==
The film was released in theatres in West Bengal on 23 May 2025, clashing with the film Onko Ki Kothin.
