= Harabo Toke =

Bengali film song

- Cover of the song, featuring actors Shakib Khan and Srabanti Chatterjee.

Single by Indraadip Dasgupta featuring Shaan

from the album Shikari (Original Motion Picture Soundtrack)
- Language: Bengali
- English title: Flee with You
- Released: 16 June 2016 (Video); 16 June 2016 (Single)
- Length: 4:54
- Label: Jaaz Music; Eskay Music
- Composer: Indraadip Dasgupta
- Lyricist: (Prasen) Prasenjit Mukherjee
- Producers: Jaaz Multimedia; Eskay Movies

Music Videos
- "Harabo Toke" on YouTube
- "Harabo Toke" on YouTube

"Harabo Toke" (English: Flee with You) is a romantic Bengali song from the soundtrack to the 2016 Indo-Bangladeshi film Shikari. Composed by Indraadip Dasgupta with lyrics by Prasen (Prasenjit Mukherjee), the song is sung by Shaan. The music video features actors Shakib Khan and Srabanti Chatterjee.

== Release and response ==
The first song Harabo Toke was released on 16 June 2016 in both Bangladesh (Jaaz Music) and India (Eskay Music). The singer Shaan performed the song. The track featured Shakib Khan and Srabanti Chatterjee and the music video was shot in London. The video received an overwhelming response on YouTube, and creating record of becoming the fastest Bengali language video track to reach 1 million views within 36 hours. The track received praises from audiences and critics.

== See also ==
- O Priya Tumi Kothay
