= Prem Ki Bujhini =

- Theatrical release poster
- Directed by: Sudipto Sarkar
- Written by: Pele Bhattacharya
- Produced by: Ashok Dhanuka; Himanshu Dhanuka; Abdul Aziz
- Starring: Om; Subhashree; Jannatul Ferdoush Peya
- Edited by: Somnath
- Music by: Savvy; Adityaa Kumar
- Production companies: Jaaz Multimedia; FB Ltd Productions
- Distributed by: Eskay Movies; Jaaz Multimedia
- Release date: 7 October 2016
- Running time: 140 Minutes
- Countries: India; Bangladesh
- Language: Bengali

Prem Ki Bujhini (transl. Don't understand what is love) is a 2016 Indo-Bangladesh joint production romantic drama film directed by Sudipto Sarkar and starring Om and Subhashree. It is a remake of the 2011 Telugu-language film 100% Love.

Om and Subhasree act together for the first time. Pia, Hasan Imam and Rebecca acted from Bangladesh.

== Cast ==
- Om as Prithwiraj / Raj
- Subhashree as Paro / Paromita
- Jannatul Ferdoush Peya as Meera (cameo appearance)
- Hasan Imam
- Rebecca Rouf
- Suprio Dutta

== Soundtrack ==
Prem Ki Bujhini

Soundtrack album by Savvy
- Released: 2016
- Recorded: 2016
- Genre: Feature film soundtrack
- Label: Eskay Movies; Jaaz Multimedia
- Producer: Himanshu Dhanuka; Abdul Aziz

Savvy chronology
Rokto (2016)	Prem Ki Bujhini (2016)

No.	Title	Lyrics	Music	Artist(s)	Length
1.	"Ami Raji"	Prasen	Savvy	Ash King, Madhubanti Bagchi	3:48
2.	"Bongo Lolona"	Priyo	Savvy	Savvy, Madhubanti Bagchi, Jayeeta	5:00
3.	"Ami Raji (Film Version)"	Prasen	Savvy	Ash King, Madhubanti Bagchi	4:11
4.	"Obhimani Mone"	Priyo	Savvy	Shadaab Hashmi	3:21
5.	"Saraswati"	Soumyadeb	Savvy	Palak Muchhal	3:08
6.	"Rang Dilo"	Soumyadeb	Savvy	Zubeen Garg	4:10

== Release ==
The film was released in theaters in India and Bangladesh on the same day on 7 October 2016. According to Jaaz Multimedia, the film was released in 96 theaters in Bangladesh.

== Remakes ==
100% Love (Telugu) (2011)	Prem Ki Bujhini (Bengali) (2016)	100% Kadhal (Tamil) (2019)
Naga Chaitanya	Om	G. V. Prakash Kumar
Tamannaah	Subhashree Ganguly	Shalini Pandey
