= Eskay Movies =

Film production company

- Type: Media and Entertainment Company
- Founded: February 1988 (as Eskay Video Private Limited)
- Headquarters: Kolkata, West Bengal, India
- Key people: Ashok Dhanuka; Himanshu Dhanuka
- Subsidiaries: Eskay Digital; Eskay Music; Eskay Digilab
- Website: eskaymovies.com

Eskay Video Private Limited is an Indian Company promoted by Dhanuka family. The company was incorporated in 1988 and since then it has been a vital part in the media and entertainment industry in India. The company has produced more than 50 films and acquired another 200 films. Eskay group has digitized 80+ Cinemas, Operated Television Channels, owns 5 Theatres, produced television serials, reality shows and webseries.

In 2019, Eskay opened up a Subsidiary in UK - High Five Productions Limited and the company is growing globally, providing Filming Equipment services and line production services to Indian films which are shot in the UK. Eskay has invested around 10 Million Pounds, equivalently in Filming Equipment and Post Production facilities in India. Internationally, Eskay's film - Doob (English title - No bed of Roses) was the official selection for Oscar. It is the first Bengali film of late legendary star Irrfan Khan.

== History ==
=== 1988–2009: Early years and initial releases ===
Eskay Movies was founded by Ashok and Himanshu Dhanuka. In 1988, Ashok Dhanuka founded Eskay Video Pvt. Ltd. Distribution house. His first distributed film, Bhai Amar Bhai, first movie of SVF. After, they distributed SVF, Swapan Saha, Prince Entertainment and other Production houses movies, including Baba Keno Chakor (1998), Sasurbari Jindabad (2000), Annadata (2002), Sathi (2002), Sneher Protidan (2003), Mayer Anchol (2003), Raju Uncle (2005). In 2007, the joint venture produced the Bengali movie Pagal Premi, . In 2008, Eskay released their first produced film, Bhalobasa Bhalobasa.From 2009, Eskay would begin to release films every year, such as, Dujone, and Jamai Raja.

=== 2010–2013: Commercial successes ===
Eskay Movies released two films in 2010, Kohono Biday Bolo Na and Wanted, the latter of which became popular for its director-actor duo of Rabi Kinagi and Jeet. After releasing Hello Memsaheb, Eskay would go on to release Fighter and Shotru in 2011.

Eskay began 2012 with the critically acclaimed film Khokababu starring Dev and Subhashree Ganguly, which became one of the highest grossing Bengali films. Eskay would go on to release Bikram Singha: The Lion Is Back and Idiot. After the successful release of Kanamachi, Eskay released Khoka 420 and Khiladi, with the former becoming a box office success. Eskay has also acquired the rights to remake the hit youth-centric romantic comedy Kannada movie Googly.

=== 2014–present: India-Bangladesh joint ventures and critical acclaim ===
Eskay Movies' sole release in 2014 was Ami Shudhu Cheyechi Tomay, which was co-produced with Bangladeshi film company Action Cut Entertainment. The film, which won the award for Best Bengali Film at the 2015 Kalakar Awards, would go on to spark a trend of Indo-Bangla joint venture films, most of which would be a co-production of Eskay Movies and Jaaz Multimedia.

Aside from their film Mayer Biye, Eskay Movies co-produced three films with Jaaz Multimedia in 2015: Romeo vs Juliet, Agnee 2 and Aashiqui: True Love. Despite having initial success with the audience, Romeo vs Juliet, a remake of the film Jatt & Juliet, was panned critically. Agnee 2, a sequel to the Bangladeshi film Agnee, was released to commercial success but mixed critical reception. Aashiqui: True Love would launch the career of actress Nusrat Faria in both India and Bangladesh.

Eskay Movies released seven films in 2016, all of which were co-produced by Jaaz Multimedia: Angaar, Hero 420, Niyoti, Badsha – The Don, Shikari, Prem Ki Bujhini and Rokto. The year began with two films starring Om, Angaar, a drama, and Hero 420, a romantic comedy. Hero 420 was released for the occasion of Valentine's Day, releasing on 12 February in India and 19 February in Bangladesh. After debuting in Angaar, Jolly starred alongside acclaimed actor Arifin Shuvo in the film Niyoti, which released in India in June and in Bangladesh in August. Badsha – The Don, a remake of the film Don Seenu starring Jeet and Nusrat Faria, received commercial success and mixed critical reception. Shikari, which stars Shakib Khan and Srabanti Chatterjee, was a commercial success and received critical acclaim, leading to a Best Film win at the Kalakar Awards, where Srabanti Chatterjee also won Best Actress. Shikari also led for two Best Actor wins for Shakib Khan, at the Tele Cine Awards and Bangladesh's Meril Prothom Alo Awards. Prem Ki Bujhini received negative reception while Rokto received mixed reception.

In 2017, Eskay Movies released two Indian films, The Bongs Again and Byomkesh O Agnibaan, and two films co-produced with Jaaz Multimedia, Nabab and Doob: No Bed of Roses. The Bongs Again, a sequel to The Bong Connection, received mixed reception. Byomkesh O Agnibaan, a sequel to Byomkesh O Chiriyakhana, also received mixed reception. Both Nabab and Doob were a box office successes and received critical acclaim, but Doob, starring Irrfan Khan, received international praise, competing at the Shanghai International Film Festival and winning at the Moscow International Film Festival.

== Films ==
=== Released ===
Year	Film	Cast	Director(s)	Note
2002	Annadata	Prosenjit Chatterjee, Sreelekha Mitra, Abdur Razzak, Anuradha Roy	Ravi Kinagi	
2004	Aakrosh	Jeet, Rituparna Sengupta, Anamika Saha, Subhasish Mukherjee, Sabyasachi, Pushpita, Mousumi Mukherjee, Rajesh Sharma	Prasanta Nanda	
2005	Rajmohol	Prosenjit Chatterjee, Abhishek Chatterjee, Anu Choudhury, Rachana Banerjee, Biplab Chatterjee, Subhasish Mukherjee	Swapan Saha	Remake of Malayalam film Manichitrathazhu
2007	Kalishankar	Prosenjit Chatterjee, Anu Chowdhury	Prashanta Nanda	
2007	Bandhu	Prosenjit Chatterjee, Swastika Mukherjee, Victor Banerjee, Rajatava Dutta	Prasanta Nanda	
2007	Pagal Premi	Yash Dasgupta, Ritwick Chakraborty, Arpita Mukherjee, Rajesh Sharma	Hara Patnaik	Remake of Telugu film Arya
2008	Bhalobasa Bhalobasa	Hiraan, Shrabanti	Rabi Kinnagi	Remake of Telugu film Bommarillu
2009	Dujone	Dev, Srabanti Chatterjee	Rajiv Kumar Biswas	Remake of Nuvvu Nenu
2009	Jamai Raja	Prosenjit Chatterjee, Anu Choudury	Swapan Saha	
2010	Wanted	Jeet, Srabanti Chatterjee	Rabi Kinnagi	Remake of Telugu film Athadu
2010	Le Chakka	Dev, Payel Sarkar	Raj Chakraborty	Remake of Chennai 600028
2011	Fighter	Jeet, Srabanti Chatterjee, Ferdous	Rabi Kinnagi	Remake of Telugu film Lakshyam
2011	Shotru	Jeet, Nusrat Jahan	Raj Chakraborty	Remake of Singam
2011	Hello Memsaheb	Jeet, Priyanka Trivedi	Nandita Roy, Shiboprasad Mukhopadhyay	2011 Piya Tumi Rishi(Actor), Priyadarshini, Rajatav Dutta
2012	Khokababu	Dev, Subhashree Ganguly	D. Shankar Aiyya	Remake of Telugu film Dhee
2012	Idiot	Ankush Hazra, Srabanti Chatterjee	Rajiv Kumar Biswas	Remake of Thiruvilaiyaadal Aarambam
2012	Bikram Singha: The Lion Is Back	Prosenjit Chatterjee, Richa Gangopadhyay	Rajiv Kumar Biswas	Remake of Telugu filmVikramarkudu
2013	Khoka 420	Dev, Subhashree Ganguly, Nusrat Jahan	Rajiv Kumar Biswas	Remake of Telugu film Brindavanam
2013	Kanamachi	Ankush Hazra, Srabanti Chatterjee, Abir Chatterjee, Saayoni Ghosh	Raj Chakraborty	Remake of Ko
2013	Khiladi	Ankush Hazra, Nusrat Jahan	Ashok Pati	Remake of Telugu film Dhenikaina Ready
2014	Ami Shudhu Cheyechi Tomay	Ankush Hazra, Subhashree Ganguly	Ashok Pati	Remake of Telugu film Arya 2 Co-produced by Action Cut Entertainment Won Kalakar Awards for Best Film
2015	Romeo vs Juliet	Ankush Hazra, Mahiya Mahi	Ashok Pati	Remake of Singh vs Kaur; Co-Produced by Jaaz Multimedia
2015	Agnee 2	Om, Mahiya Mahi	Iftakar Chowdhury, Himunshu Dhanuka	Co-Produced by Jaaz Multimedia
2015	Aashiqui: True Love	Ankush Hazra, Nusraat Faria Mazhar	Ashok Pati	Remake of Telugu film Ishq; Co-Produced by Jaaz Multimedia
2015	Mayer Biye	Saayoni Ghosh, Sreelekha Mitra	Abhijit Guha, Sudeshna Roy	Radical Story
2016	Angaar	Om, Falguni Rahman Jolly	Wazed Ali Sumon, Nehal Dutta	Remake of Appayya; Co-Produced by Jaaz Multimedia
2016	Hero 420	Om, Nusraat Faria Mazhar, Riya Sen	Sujit Mondal	Remake of Telugu film Maska; Co-Produced by Jaaz Multimedia
2016	Niyoti	Arifin Shuvoo, Falguni Rahman Jolly	Jakir Hossain Raju	Remake of The Notebook; Co-Produced by Jaaz Multimedia
2016	Badsha – The Don	Jeet, Nusraat Faria Mazhar, Shraddha Das	Baba Yadav	Remake of Telugu film Don Seenu; Co-Produced by Jaaz Multimedia
2016	Shikari	Shakib Khan, Srabanti Chatterjee	Joydip Mukherjee	Remake of Aadhavan; Co-Produced by Jaaz Multimedia
2016	Prem Ki Bujhini	Om, Subhashree Ganguly	Sudipto Sarkar	Remake of 100% Love; Co-produced by Jaaz Multimedia
2016	Rokto	Pori Moni, Ziaul Roshan	Wazed Ali Sumon	Loosely Based on Hollywood movie The Long Kiss Goodnight; Co-Produced by Jaaz Multimedia
2016	Kiriti Roy	Chiranjeet Chakraborty	Aniket Choudory	Based on Nihar Ranjan Gupta's Setarer Sur
2017	The Bongs Again	Parno Mitra, Neha Panda, Gaurav Chakrabarty, Jisshu Sengupta	Anjan Dutt	
2017	Nabab	Shakib Khan, Subhashree Ganguly	Joydip Mukherjee	Co-Produced by Jaaz Multimedia
2017	Byomkesh O Agnibaan	Jishu Sengupta, Swastika Mukherjee	Anjun Dutt	
2017	Doob: No Bed Of Roses	Irfan Khan, Nusrat Imrose Tisha	Mostofa Sarwar Farooki	Co-Produced by Jaaz Multimedia
2018	Ami Neta Hobo	Shakib Khan, Bidya Sinha Mim, Omar Sani, Moushumi, Sadek Bachchu	Uttam Akash	Co-Produced by Shapla Media
2018	Chalbaaz	Shakib Khan, Subhashree Ganguly	Joydip Mukherjee	Remake of Subramanyam For Sale; Co-Produced by Action Cut Entertainment
2018	Bhaijaan Elo Re	Shakib Khan, Srabanti Chatterjee, Payel Sarkar	Joydip Mukherjee	
2018	Tui Sudhu Amar	Soham Chakraborty, Mahiya Mahi, Om	Joydip Mukherjee	Remake Of Humraaz Co-Produced by Action Cut Entertainment
2019	Bhokatta	Om, Elina Samantray, Sagnik	Ramesh Rout	Remake Of Odia Film Tokata Fasigala
2020	Hullor	Soham Chakraborty, Srabanti Chatterjee, Om, Darshana Banik	Abhimanyu Mukherjee	
2021	Anusandhan	Saswata Chatterjee, Payel Sarkar, Churni Ganguly, Joydip Mukherjee, Riddhi Sen	Kamaleshwar Mukherjee	Based on the 1956 German novel A Dangerous Game by Friedrich Dürrenmatt
2022	Swastik Sanket	Nusrat Jahan, Gaurav Chakrabarty, Saswata Chatterjee, Rudranil Ghosh, Shataf Figar	Sayantan Ghosal	Based on the novel Narak Sanket by Debarati Mukhopadhyay
2022	Ogo Bideshini	Ankush Hazra, Alexandra Taylor, Rajnandini Paul	Anshuman Pratyush	
2023	Aaro Ek Prithibi	Kaushik Ganguly, Shaheb Bhattacharjee, Tasnia Farin	Atanu Ghosh	
2023	Ghore Pherar Gaan	Parambrata Chatterjee, Ishaa Saha	Aritya Sen	
2024	Dard	Shakib Khan, Sonal Chauhan, Payel Sarkar	Anonno Mamun	
2025	Oporichito	Ritwick Chakraborty, Ishaa Saha, Anirban Chakrabarti	Joydeep Mukherjee	Released on 10 January 2025
2025	Jodi Emon Hoto	Ditipriya Roy, Sean Banerjee, Rishav Basu	Rabindra Nambiar	
2025	Babushona	Jeetu Kamal, Srabanti Chatterjee	Anshuman Pratyush	
2025	Grihosto	Ritabhari Chakraborty, Saheb Bhattacharya, Aryann Bhowmick	Mainak Bhaumik	
2025	Annapurna	Ananya Chatterjee, Ditipriya Roy, Rishav Basu, Arna Mukhopadhyay	Anshuman Pratyush	
2025	Chandrabindoo	Ankush Hazra, Oindrila Sen, Shantilal Mukherjee, Tulika Basu	Raja Chanda	Released on 23 May 2025
2025	Rabindra Kabya Rahasya	Ritwick Chakraborty, Srabanti Chatterjee	Sayantan Ghosal	Released on 20 June 2025
2025	Tobuo Bhalobashi	Aryann Bhowmik, Debattama Saha, Saheb Bhattacharya	Rabindra Nambiar	
2025	Saralakkho Holmes	Rishav Basu, Arna Mukhopadhyay, Gaurav Chakraborty	Sayantan Ghosal	
2026	Abar Hawa Bodol	Parambrata Chatterjee,Raima Sen,Rudranil Ghosh,Anusha Viswanathan	Parambrata Chatterjee	
2026	Dear D	Srabanti Chatterjee, Ditipriya Roy	Rabindra Nambiar	
