= Mousumi Saha =

Indian actress

- Born: Hyderabad, Telangana, India
- Occupations: Actress; Television Actress
- Years active: 1995–present

Mousumi Saha is an Indian actress. She acts in films in many languages. She also starred in 58 episodes of the Star Jalsha serial Khokababu, airing from 2017 as "Kaushalya Mukherjee".

== Filmography ==
| Year | Films | Role | Notes |
|---|---|---|---|
| 2003 | Chokher Bali | | |
| 2008 | Premer Kahini | Akash's mother | |
| 2009 | Prem Amar | | |
| 2009 | Paran Jai Jaliya Re | Raj's mother | |
| 2009 | Dujone | Meghna's mother | |
| 2010 | Bolo Na Tumi Aamar | Madhurima's mother | |
| 2010 | Notobor Notout | | |
| 2010 | Wanted | | |
| 2010 | Shedin Dekha Hoyechilo | Neelkanta's wife | |
| 2011 | Fighter | Indu's mother | |
| 2012 | Paglu 2 | Dev's mother | |
| 2012 | Tor Naam | | |
| 2013 | Rangbaaz | Raj's mother | |
| 2015 | Besh Korechi Prem Korechi | | |
| 2016 | Shikari | | Indo-Bangladesh joint production |
| 2016 | Niyoti | Shuvro's mother | Indo-Bangladesh joint production |
| 2017 | Nabab | | Indo-Bangladesh joint production |
| 2018 | Chalbaaz | | |

== Television ==
- Sindoorkhela (2010-2012)
- Khokababu (2016-2018)
- Deep Jwele Jaai (2015-2017)
- Bidhir Bidhan (2012-2013)
- Dhonni Meye (2009-2011)
- Bikele Bhorer Phool(2017)
- Guriya Jekhane Guddu Sekhane(2018–2020)
- Durga Durgeshwari (2019-2020)
- Kopalkundola(2019-2020)
- Khelaghor (2020-2022)
- Gangaram (2020–2022)
- Gouri Elo (2022–2023)
- Ke Prothom Kache Eshechi (2024)
- Tui Amar Hero (2025)
- Tilottama (2026)
