= Fighter (2011 film) =

- Fighter Movie Poster
- Directed by: Ravi Kinnagi
- Written by: Sriwass (Original story)
- Screenplay by: Ravi Kinnagi
- Based on: Lakshyam
- Produced by: Ashok Dhanuka; Himanshu Dhanuka; Gopal Madnani; Amit Jumrani
- Starring: Jeet; Srabanti Chatterjee; Ferdous Ahmed; Locket Chatterjee; Biswajit Chakraborty; Biplab Chatterjee; Ashish Vidyarthi; Arindam Saha
- Cinematography: P. Sylva Kumar
- Edited by: Ravi Ranjan Maitra
- Music by: Indraadip Dasgupta
- Production companies: Eskay Movies; IOU Films
- Distributed by: Eskay Movies
- Release date: 7 January 2011
- Running time: 160 minutes
- Country: India
- Language: Bengali
- Budget: 3 CR
- Box office: 7CR

Fighter (subtitled as Marbo noy Morbo; transl. Fighter: I will kill otherwise die) is a 2011 Indian Bengali-language action film written and directed by Ravi Kinnagi. It is a remake of the 2007 Telugu action film, Lakshyam. Produced by Jeet and Ashok Dhanuka under the banner of IOU Films and Eskay Movies respectively, the film stars Jeet, Srabanti Chatterjee, Ferdous, Bharat Kaul, Locket Chatterjee, Biswajit Chakraborty in lead roles, with Ashish Vidyarthi and Arindam Saha as a guest appearance. The soundtrack of the film was composed by Indraadip Dasgupta, while the background score was by S. P. Venkatesh. The film follows a 3rd year college student named Surya, taking revenge for the gruesome and violent murder of his elder brother, who was a sincere police officer and keeps it hidden from his family.

Jeet took a tough training for a year, to make 8 pack abs for the introductory fight sequence. Fighter marks the 8th collaboration between Jeet and Ravi Kinnagi. It was a super hit at the box office and received mixed to positive reviews from the critics.

== Plot ==
The film starts with a flashback. ACP Subhas Chandra Bose is a sincere police officer, living with his parents, wife, daughter and younger brother Surya, who is a college student and he falls in love with his classmate Indu. Indu comes across ACP Bose when she is on a field trip from her college with her friends. She gets friendly with his daughter Pinky who tells her that she will introduce her to her uncle Surya and they would make a good pair. But Surya studies in Indu's college and soon after, they accidentally come to know each other and get close.

Shankar, a notorious promoter as well as gangster known for settlements and land deals. ACP Bose investigates the case of a dreaded criminal Section Shankar whom no one has been able to touch. He is even involved with a land deal involving crores of money which is completely illegal and others including the D.I.G. is involved. When the chairman of the bank who has lent money for the deal demand the money back as the deal hasn't worked, but Section Shankar eliminates him. The people who are customers of the bank take to the streets and try to damage the bank. ACP Bose arrives there, arrests the manager and takes him away.

Somehow Section Shankar discovers where the manager has been taken. He arrives there with his men and the D.I.G. and nearly kill ACP Bose. Section Shankar asks his men to dump the body. On the way, somehow Surya gets involved and ultimately rescues his brother from a burning bus and the elder brother dies in the younger brother's arms. The entire media and the people think that ACP Bose has swindled off all the money as they have been made to believe that by the D.I.G. Surya decides to take revenge on the people who killed his brother. Firstly he kills Nikhil (his friend and Section Shankar's friend) . Then he kills the D.I.G. (he had been taken to jail and he had escaped). Nikhil had also kidnapped Indu as he wants her at any cost, but Surya rescues her. Section Shankar also kidnaps the entire family of Surya. Surya goes to Section Shankar house's where he kills Shankar and rescues his family under the supervision of the new D.I.G. who supports him wholeheartedly.

== Cast ==
- Jeet as Surya
- Srabanti as Indu
- Ferdous Ahmed as A.C.P Subhash Bose
- Locket Chatterjee as A.C.P Bose's wife
- Biplab Chatterjee as a corrupt D.I.G.
- Ashish Vidyarthi as D.I.G. (cameo)
- Biswajit Chakraborty as Surya and A.C.P Bose's father
- Joy Badlani as Indu's father
- Bharat Kaul as Section Shankar
- Sumit Ganguly
- Mousumi Saha as Indu's mother
- Biswanath Basu as Ice-Cream Boy
- Gargi Banerjee as Newsreader
- Arindam Saha as Industrialist, Business man

== Soundtrack ==
All lyrics are written by Gautam Sushmit, Priyo Chatterjee and Prasen; all music is composed by Indraadip Dasgupta.

Track listing
No.	Title	Lyrics	Music	Singer(s)	Length
1.	"Fighter (Title Track)"	Goutam Susmit, Priyo Chatterjee, Prasen	Indraadip Dasgupta	Dibyendu Mukherjee; Indraadip Dasgupta	2:05
2.	"Mon banjara"	Goutam Susmit, Priyo Chatterjee, Prasen	Indraadip Dasgupta	Kunal Ganjawala, Monali Thakur	4:25
3.	"Ke Se"	Goutam Susmit, Priyo Chatterjee, Prasen	Indraadip Dasgupta	Shaan, Monali Thakur	4:22
4.	"O Sona"	Goutam Susmit, Priyo Chatterjee, Prasen	Indraadip Dasgupta	Kunal Ganjawala, Monali Thakur	3:52
5.	"Nana Ronge"		Indraadip Dasgupta	Mahalakshmi Iyer	4:30
6.	"Nana Ronge (Sad)"		Indraadip Dasgupta	Soham Chakraborty	3:02

== Reception ==
=== Critical reception ===
Roshni Mukherjee of The Times of India rated the film 3.5/5 stars and wrote "Back in full josh with the Jeet-Srabanti jodi, Ravi Kinagi casts his commercial magic once again. The man knows how to utilize his characters and he does so this time around too. If commercial is your cup of tea and you swear by the Ravi Kinagi-Jeet-Srabanti combo, “Fighter” should be the film on your list."
