= Rabindra Kabya Rahasya =

2023 Indian Bengali-language film

- Theatrical release poster
- Directed by: Sayantan Ghosal
- Written by: Sougato Basu
- Produced by: Eskay Movies
- Starring: Ritwick Chakraborty; Srabanti Chatterjee; Priyanshu Chatterjee; Rajnandini Paul
- Cinematography: Tuban
- Edited by: Subhajit Singha
- Music by: Debojyoti Mishra
- Production company: Eskay Movies
- Release dates: 21 November 2023 (IFFI); 20 June 2025 (India)
- Running time: 117 minutes
- Country: India
- Language: Bengali

Rabindra Kabya Rahasya (lit. 'The Mystery of Rabindra's Poetry') is a 2025 Indian Bengali-language neo-noir mystery thriller film directed by Sayantan Ghosal. The film investigates a conspiracy spanning a century, linking Rabindranath Tagore's legacy to forged manuscripts and politically charged accusations, including claims that Tagore opposed Indian independence.

== Plot ==
In 1921 London, poet Ekalavya Sen is murdered after his unpublished works are plagiarized by rivals seeking to undermine Tagore's literary reputation. A century later, in 2021, crime writer Abhik Bose (Ritwick Chakraborty) and Rabindra Sangeet researcher Hiya Sen (Srabanti Chatterjee) uncover cryptic clues in Tagore's poetry, exposing a conspiracy to tarnish his legacy with fabricated claims about his political loyalties. The investigation leads to a serial-killing case in London, where Hiya's potential connection to the murders becomes pivotal.

== Cast ==
- Ritwick Chakraborty as Abhik Bose, crime writer
- Srabanti Chatterjee as Hiya Sen, descendant of Ekalavya Sen
- Priyanshu Chatterjee as Gurudev Rabindranath Tagore
- Rajnandini Paul as Niharika Shome, Ekalavya's love interest
- Jamie Humphrey
- Rwitobroto Mukherjee as Ekalavya Sen
- Richard Hobdey as John Dyer
- Tarak Nath Gorai as Tripura Maharaj
- Joy Bhowmik as Roopchand
- Christopher Solomon Davis as Secret Agent, London Police
- Tom Coulston as Fred
- Shantilal Mukherjee as Alokanando Ghosh
- Bidipta Chakraborty as Shalini Sengupta, a journalist
- Sujan Mukherjee as Budhaditya Banerjee, who wanted to prove Tagore as an anti-Indian
- Joydeep Mukherjee as police officer in Kolkata

== Production ==
=== Development and Casting ===
Ghosal envisioned the film as a "cultural thriller," blending historical fiction with suspense. Priyanshu Chatterjee was cast as Tagore after makeup artist Azad recommended him for his symbolic portrayal of icons like Satyajit Ray in prior projects. Ritwick Chakraborty and Srabanti Chatterjee were chosen for their chemistry in prior thrillers, with Srabanti training in Rabindra Sangeet for authenticity.

=== Filming ===
Principal photography began in June 2022 in London, with scenes shot at locations Tagore visited during his 1912–1913 stay. Six makeup designs were created for Priyanshu to depict Tagore from ages 29 to 79.

== Release ==
The film premiered at the 54th International Film Festival of India (IFFI) on 21 November 2023. A motion poster released in November 2024 featured Tagore's image with the line, “A Rabindra-devotee poet and his tale of revenge,” alongside a blood-stained knife. Despite a nomination for UNESCO's Gandhi Medal, it lost to the Franco-Greek film Drift.

== Reception ==
The IFFI premiere sparked debates over its speculative portrayal of Tagore's political views, with scholars criticizing creative liberties.

=== Critical reception ===
Poorna Banerjee of The Times of India rated the film 3/5 stars and described it as "Despite its flaws, Rabindra Kabya Rahasya is a visually compelling, accessible thriller that entertains without overreaching." She praised the film's visual language, cinematography, the precisely authentic portrayal of Tagore and a deep cast but criticised the weak writing in the second half and weak historical screenplay at certain points.

== See also ==
- Rabindranath Tagore
- Works of Rabindranath Tagore
