= Champion (2003 film) =

2003 Bengali sports-drama film by Rabi Kinagi

- The poster for the film Champion
- Directed by: Rabi Kinagi
- Written by: Rabi Kinagi
- Produced by: Shree Venkatesh Films
- Starring: Jeet; Srabanti Chatterjee; Deepankar De
- Cinematography: V. Probhakar
- Edited by: Atish Chandra Sarkar
- Music by: S P Venkatesh; Ramana Gogula
- Distributed by: Ashadeep Entertainment
- Release date: 6 June 2003
- Running time: 166 mins
- Country: India
- Language: Bengali

Champion is a 2003 Bengali sports-drama film directed by Rabi Kinagi. The movie features Jeet and Srabanti Chatterjee. It is Jeet's third movie and Srabanti Chatterjee's debut as a heroine. The film is a remake of the 1999 Telugu film Thammudu.

== Synopsis ==
The main theme of the film depicts how an irresponsible boy can be very responsible at a particular stage of life. Raja is a college student who is forever committing mischief. He and his peers Bhola, Dhonu & Kanu always stay on the top of the list of failures. Raja has an elder brother, Rohit, who is the exact opposite of the infamous Raja. Rohit works at their father's cafe and is bright in his studies. Their father is fed up with the restless Raja. Even after repeated whacking from his father, he doesn't change. Raja's only support is his childhood friend Kavita who is secretly in love with him. But the flirtatious Raja finds solace in the spoilt brat Riya, the daughter of a rich businessman. Raja saves Riya from the playboy rich student Ronny. But Riya dumps Raja & patches up with the affluent Rony. In the meanwhile, Rohit starts rigorously practicing for the upcoming kickboxing championship final against Rony. But all preparations went in vain as Rohit is beaten by Rony & his mates. Rohit is hospitalized in a critical condition. Raja approaches Rohit's coach and begs him to train Raja. Thus a vigorous practice schedule begins. Raja, with support from Kavita gets himself ready for the match. In the match, he emerges victorious and dedicates the trophy to Rohit and then celebrates his love with Kavita.

== Cast ==
- Jeet as Raja
- Srabanti Chatterjee as Kavita
- Deepankar De as Raja's Father
- Rajesh Sharma as Sports Coach
- Siddhartha Banerjee as Rohit
- Subhasish Mukherjee as Kanu, Raja's friend
- Rudranil Ghosh as Dhonu
- Bhola Tamang as Bhola
- Sagnik Chatterjee as Ronny
- Sandhita Chatterjee as Riya
- Shyamal Dutta as Hemanta, Kavita's Father

== Soundtrack ==
Singers are Kavita Krishnamurthy, Babul Supriyo, Mano, Jojo, Reema Mukherjee. The song "Travelling Soldier" was reused from Thammudu.

All lyrics are written by Gautam Sushmit; all music is composed by S. P. Venkatesh.

Track listing
| No. | Title | Singer(s) | Length |
|---|---|---|---|
| 1. | "Mone Pore Koto Kotha" | Kavita Krishnamurthy | 04:42 |
| 2. | "Travelling Soldier" | Ramana Gogula | 03:38 |
| 3. | "Srimoti Ektu Darao" | Mano | 05:43 |
| 4. | "Chokhe Lage Nesha" | Babul Supriyo, Kavita Krishnamurthy | 05:20 |
| 5. | "Cholo Na Prem Kori" | Mano, Kavita Krishnamurthy | 04:06 |
| 6. | "Kobe Je Amar Naam" | Babul Supriyo | 03:02 |
| 7. | "Bondhu Bole Dako Jare (Male)" | Mano | 05:03 |

== Reception ==
Champion was a high critically and commercially successful. Mainly Jeet's comic timing and acting were praised.

== Awards ==
Best Actor nomination (Jeet), Best Supporting Actor nomination (Siddhartha Banerjee) and Best Playback Singer nomination (Babul Supriyo).
