= Notobor Notout =

2010 Indian Bengali film

- Release poster
- Directed by: Amit Sen
- Screenplay by: Kamaleswar Mukherjee
- Starring: Raima Sen; Kharaj Mukherjee; Chandan Sen; Kaushik Ganguly
- Cinematography: Sampad Roy
- Edited by: Sumit Ghosh
- Music by: Debojyoti Mishra
- Production company: Bunch Of Buddies
- Release date: 12 November 2010
- Country: India
- Language: Bengali

Notobor Notout is a Bengali comedy drama film directed by Amit Sengupta and screenplayed by Kamaleshwar Mukherjee. This film was released on 12 November 2010.

== Plot ==
Notobor, a typical Bengali youngman wants to be a poet. Without getting appreciation he becomes frustrated. One night he dreams of Rabindranath Tagore. The great poet grants the wish of Notobor and turns him into a talented poet for a limited period. By this poetic power he tries to impress Mistu, his crush.

== Cast ==
- Prokash Golam Mustafa as Notobor
- Raima Sen as Mistu
- Kharaj Mukherjee as Balai
- Mir Afsar Ali as Painter
- Moon Moon Sen
- Kaushik Ganguly
- Saayoni Ghosh
- Biswajit Chakraborty as Corbett
- Sudipa Basu as Sutapa
- Ramaprasad Banik as Brajeswar
- Chandan Sen
- Saswata Chatterjee
- Kamalika Banerjee as Manjula
- Mousumi Saha
