= Googly (2019 film) =

- Film poster
- Directed by: Abhimanyu Mukherjee
- Screenplay by: Abhimanyu Mukherjee
- Produced by: Nispal Singh
- Starring: Soham Chakraborty; Srabanti Chatterjee
- Cinematography: Goopi Bhagat
- Edited by: Sujay Datta Ray
- Music by: Savvy; Prosen
- Production company: Surinder Films
- Release date: 19 March 2019
- Running time: 2h 13m
- Country: India
- Language: Bengali

Googly is a 2019 Indian romantic comedy film which is directed by Abhimanyu Mukherjee. It stars Srabanti Chatterjee and Soham Chakraborty.

== Cast ==
- Srabonti Chatterjee
- Soham Chakraborty
- Kanchan Mallick
- Aritra Dutta Banik
- Manasi Sinha
- Oindrila Saha

== Soundtrack ==
Track listing
No.	Title	Singer(s)	Length
1.	"Maa"	Madhuraa Bhattacharya	2:34
2.	"Katha Chilo Kato"	Iman Chakraborty, Timir Biswas	4:43
3.	"Tintin"	Raj Barman, Prashmita Paul	3:33
4.	"Maa (Sad Version)"	Shreyan	3:17
