= Mayar Badhon =

- Directed by: Swapan Saha
- Produced by: Shrikant Mohta; Mahendra Soni
- Starring: Prosenjit Chatterjee; Rituparna Sengupta; Satabdi Roy; Anuradha Roy; Abhishek Chatterjee; Subhendu Chatterjee; Rabi Ghosh; Srabanti Chatterjee; Soham Chakraborty
- Music by: Debojyoti Mishra
- Production company: Shree Venkatesh Films
- Distributed by: Shree Venkatesh Films
- Release date: 1997
- Country: India
- Language: Bengali

Mayar Badhon is a 1997 Bengali film directed by Swapan Saha and produced by Shree Venkatesh Films under the banner of Shree Venkatesh Films. The film narrates the story of a man who once learns that the girl he has so long believed to be his own daughter, is the daughter of someone else. The film stars Prosenjit Chatterjee and Rituparna Sengupta in leading roles. It also stars Subhendu Chatterjee, Abhishek Chatterjee, Rabi Ghosh, Satabdi Roy, Anuradha Roy, Srabanti Chatterjee and Soham Chakraborty in supporting roles. The film marked the big screen debut of Srabanti Chatterjee. The music of the film has been composed by Debojyoti Mishra.

== Plot ==
Sagar Mukherjee is a tea taster. He lives beside the house of Shipra, his neighbour. Prasad Halder is the boss of Sagar's company and also lives beside them. Sagar and Shipra fall in love and go for registry marriage without informing Shipra's parents. Prasad helps them. Shipra starts living with Sagar but Shipra's father does not accept this relationship. Shipra becomes pregnant and has to be admitted in a hospital. There she meets with Krishna who is also pregnant. Shipra and Krishna give birth to girls on the same day, but suddenly fire breaks out in the hospital, and the girls are exchanged. Only the doctor and the nurse know this. Shipra and Sagar's daughter Maya, Nirmal and Krishna's daughter Trishna grow up. One day Shipra dies due to cardiac failure. So, taking Maya, Sagar shifts to a tea-garden. There he meets Nirmal and Krishna with their son Kushal and daughter Trishna. One day it is revealed that Trishna has a heart problem. The nurse accidentally learns about the Krishna's present status in the city and her girl's problem. In a major operation Trishna dies. The nurse reveals the incident of exchange of the babies to Krishna. Krishna and Nirmal discovered Maya's origin, but Sagar does not want to handover Maya to them. By law, Nirmal and Krishna get the charge of Maya. But Maya does not want to live with them. Sagar breaks down. Kushal does not want to recognise Maya as his sister. Maya runs away with Kushal and unites with her father Sagar and Krishna and Nirmal accept it.

== Cast ==
- Prosenjit Chatterjee as Sagar Mukherjee
- Srabanti Chatterjee as Maya
- Abhishek Chatterjee as Nirmal
- Subhendu Chatterjee
- Rabi Ghosh as Prasad Halder
- Rituparna Sengupta as Shipra
- Satabdi Roy as Krishna
- Anuradha Roy
- Soham Chakraborty as Kushal
