= Shotru =

- Theatrical Poster of Shotru
- Directed by: Raj Chakraborty
- Screenplay by: Padmanabha Dasgupta; Raj Chakraborty
- Dialogues by: Abhimanyu Mukherjee
- Story by: Raj Chakraborty
- Produced by: Ashok Dhanuka
- Starring: Jeet; Nusrat Jahan; Supriyo Dutta; Biswajit Chakraborty; Dipankar De; Biplab Chatterjee; Saayoni Ghosh; Arindam Saha
- Cinematography: P. Selvakumar
- Edited by: Rabi Ranjan Maitra
- Music by: Indraadip Dasgupta
- Production company: Eskay Movies
- Distributed by: Eskay Movies
- Release date: 3 June 2011
- Running time: 166 minutes
- Country: India
- Language: Bengali

Shotru (Bengali: শত্রু ; English: Enemy) is a 2011 Indian Bengali-language action crime film co-written and directed by Raj Chakraborty. Produced by Ashok Dhanuka under the banner of Eskay Movies. A remake of the 2010 Tamil movie Singam, it stars Jeet, Supriyo Dutta and Nusrat Jahan in lead roles, while Kharaj Mukherjee, Dipankar De, Biswajit Chakraborty, Saayoni Ghosh, Raja Dutta, Biplab Chatterjee and Arindam Saha played other pivotal roles. It marks the debut of Nusrat Jahan. The soundtrack and background score was composed by Indraadip Dasgupta, with screenplay and dialogues written by Padmanabha Dasgupta and Abhimanyu Mukherjee.

Clashing with Dev and Koel Mallick starrer Paglu, it was an all time blockbuster at the box office, with a successful run of over 210 days in theatres. It received positive reviews from critics. Critics appreciated the social messages and portrayals with Jeet and Dutta's performance and stylized action sequences which plays a very pivotal role in this film.

Shotru marks the second collaboration between Jeet and Raj Chakraborty. Jeet's memorable dialogue in the film, "Ami kono ishwarnoi je chhere debo aar rakshasnoi je mere debo, ami holam police, saala chhara aar marar majhkhane lotke rekhe debo" ("Neither am I the god who will forgive you, nor the monster who will kill you; I am the police, and I will hang you, scoundrel, for forgiving or killing"), has become a firm favourite with audiences. It was later dubbed into Hindi as Ek Policewale Ki Taaqat.

== Plot ==
Dibakar Singha is a police sub-inspector from Hridaypur, working in the city of Howrah. Arjun Sarkar uses a job as a real estate agent to cover for crimes, including kidnapping and extortion, getting police. Dibakar learns of his crimes and decides to try and kill him.

Dibakar falls in love with Puja, a woman who is visiting her grandfather on vacation. She convinces Dibakar to fight the corruption in the police department and Arjun.

Dibakar is promoted to the head of an anti-kidnapping squad by the Home Minister. He conducts raids on Arjun's hideout and imprisons Arjun's brother Karna, who is innocent. To free his brother, Arjun plans to kidnap Puja's younger sister, Diya, but Dibakar foils the attempt by catching two of the kidnappers. One of the kidnappers confesses that they were hired by Arjun, providing Dibakar with the necessary evidence to prove Arjun's involvement in 62 kidnappings. Dibakar announces that two kidnappers were apprehended and the money was recovered and will be used as a government asset unless someone lays claim to it.

Almost exposed for his involvement, Arjun plans to lure Dibakar to his hideout to kill him. Dibakar, however, learns of Arjun's plan to have him killed and decides to go meet Arjun in disguise. There he kills Ratan, a close friend of Arjun. Then, Dibakar tells Arjun that Ratan has agreed to be a state witness against him. To prevent this from happening, Arjun sends someone to kill Ratan in the hospital. When Karna, the assassin, arrives at the hospital, he is killed by Dibakar while on the phone with Arjun. Angered by this, tries to kill Puja, who escapes with a bullet in her arm.

Dibakar exposes his superior, the DSP, as Arjun's mole in the police department. Having been exposed, the DSP is then forced into aiding Dibakar in exposing Arjun.

Arjun kidnaps the daughter of the Assam Home Minister and takes her to Jharkhand. Dibakar pursues him and kills Arjun.

At a ceremony to honour Dibakar for his actions, Dibakar announces that he will return to his village and that he has finished what he set out to do in the city. Puja is shown accompanying him on this journey.

== Cast ==
- Jeet as Dibakar "Diba" Singha, Head of Anti-Kidnapping Task Force of WB Police (formerly OC of Hridaypur
- Nusrat Jahan as Puja Chowdhury, Dibakar's love interest
- Supriyo Dutta as Arjun Sarkar, a real estate agent and kidnapping head based in Howrah
- Dipankar De as Sudhakar Singha, Dibakar's father
- Biswajit Chakraborty as Mahendra Chowdhury, Puja's father
- Swagata Basu as Puja's mother
- Saayoni Ghosh as Diya, Puja's sister
- Biplab Chatterjee as DSP Anup Chatterjee
- Kharaj Mukherjee as SI Bhajan Samanta
- Rabi Ranjan Maitra as ACP Pranab Basu
- Raja Dutta as Karna Sarkar, Arjun's younger brother
- Pradip Mukherjee as Bibhash Basak, an NRI businessman
- Padmanabha Dasgupta as Dayal Khashnobish, Arjun's lawyer
- Arindam Saha as Kidnapper in negative role
- Pradip Dhar as Arjun's henchman
- Somnath Kar as Arjun's henchman
- Subrata Guha Roy as Giridhari, Arjun's rival
- Subhomoy Chatterjee as the goat owner
- Abhimanyu Mukherjee as Arjun's henchman
- Vascar Dev as SI Subrata, Dibakar's colleague
- Rocky Rajesh as Yoginder Yadav, a gangster based in Jharkhand

=== Special appearances ===
- Raj Chakraborty as himself
- Haradhan Bandopadhyay as Ramendra Chowdhury, Puja's grandfather
- Debika Mitra as Dibakar's mother

== Soundtrack ==
Shotru

Soundtrack album by Indraadip Dasgupta
- Released: 3 June 2011
- Genre: Feature film soundtrack
- Language: Bengali
- Label: Eskay Movies
- Producer: Ashok Dhanuka

Indraadip Dasgupta chronology
Le Chakka (2010)	Shotru (2011)	Fighter (2011)

Singles from Shotru
- 1. "Shotru title track (Om Bhur Bhuva Swaha)"; 2. "Rakhe Hori Ke Maare"; 3. "Aye Khuda"; 4. "Jani Na Kobe Dekha Hobe"; 5. "Jwaliye Puriye Debo Ghum Uriye"

All lyrics are written by Srijato and Prasen; all music is composed by Indraadip Dasgupta.

No.	Title	Lyrics	Music	Singer(s)	Length
1.	"Shotru title track (Om Bhur Bhuva Swaha)"	Srijato	Indraadip Dasgupta	Rupam Islam	2:20
2.	"Rakhe Hari Ke Maare"	Srijato	Indraadip Dasgupta	Javed Ali; Soham Chakraborty	2:47
3.	"Aye Khuda"	Prasen	Indraadip Dasgupta	Shaan; Shahdab Hussain; Altamash	3:41
4.	"Janina Kobe Dekha Hobe"	Srijato	Indraadip Dasgupta	Shaan; Anwesshaa	4:16
5.	"Jwaliye Puriye Debo Ghum Uriye"	Srijato	Indraadip Dasgupta	June Banerjee; Timir Biswas	4:12

== Cancelled sequel ==
In June 2018, it was revealed that Raj Chakraborty is going to collaborate with Jeet for Jeet 50 after Abhimaan (2016). Rumours reported it to be the sequel of Shotru, in which Subhashree Ganguly was being approached as Puja, replacing Nusrat Jahan as she rejected the role. Then in an interview, Chakraborty revealed that there were no plans of making Shotru 2 without a true story that would reflect the core plot, where the previous film was itself based on true events. But he also told that his collaboration with Jeet would be itself a standalone project. Later, the film was announced to be Jeet's 50th film under the title Shesh Theke Shuru (2019) and released on the occasion of Eid 2019.
