= The Bongs Again =

2017 Indian Bengali film by Anjan Dutt

- Poster of The Bongs Again
- Directed by: Anjan Dutt
- Written by: Anjan Dutt
- Screenplay by: Anjan Dutt
- Produced by: Himanshu Dhanuka
- Starring: Parno Mitra; Neha Panda; Anjan Dutt; Gaurav Chakrabarty; Jisshu Sengupta
- Edited by: Arghyakamal Mitra
- Music by: Neel Dutt
- Production company: Eskay Movies
- Distributed by: Eskay Movies
- Release date: 13 January 2017
- Running time: 117 minutes
- Country: India
- Languages: Bengali; English

The Bongs Again is a 2017 Indian bilingual (Bengali/English) film directed by Anjan Dutt and produced by Overseas Films Limited. The film stars Parno Mitra, Neha Panda, Anjan Dutt, Gaurav Chakraborty, Jisshu Sengupta. It was theatrically released on 13 January 2017.

== Synopsis ==
10 years after The Bong Connection, The Bongs Again is a journey of two young women. Sara, in her 20s, comes to Kolkata from the UK to look for her biological mother. Oli, also in her 20s, goes to London from Kolkata in search of her father who had left her and the family.

The two women search for their blood relations.The film depicts cosmo Calcuttans and NRI Bengalis, alongside their lifestyle, thinking, and approach towards life.

== Cast ==
- Deepak Anand as Deepak (father)
- Aditi Bajpai as Aitree, the friend
- Gaurav Chakrabarty as Anindya
- Subhra Sourav Das
- Anjan Dutt
- Hassan Khan
- Bradley Wj Miller as gang leader
- Parno Mittra as Oli
- Neha Panda as Sara
- Jisshu Sengupta as Jisshu
- 'mJo Wheatley as Martha
- Dhritiman Chatterjee

== Soundtrack ==
The songs are written by Rabindranath Tagore, and Neel Dutt. The music composer is Neel Dutt.

No.	Title	Artist	Length
1	"Hridmajharey Rakhbo"	Shreya Ghoshal, Shaan and Anjan Dutt	4:52
2	"Ey Shohor"	Neel Dutt	5:41
3	"The Bongs Again"	Neel Adhikari	3:38
4	"Tomaye Gaan Shonabo"	Somlata Acharyya Chowdhury, Anjan Dutt	5:01
