= Sesh Sangbad =

- Directed by: Pallav Gupta
- Written by: Pallav Gupta
- Produced by: Anju Thakur
- Starring: Srabanti Chatterjee; Sujoy Ghosh; Moushumi Chatterjee
- Cinematography: Rupanjan Paul
- Edited by: Mahadeb Shi
- Music by: Amit Sur
- Production company: Sky View Entertainment
- Distributed by: Eros Entertainment
- Release date: 29 July 2016
- Running time: 120 minutes
- Country: India
- Language: Bengali

Sesh Sangbad (English : Last News) is a 2016 Bengali language crime-thriller film written & directed by Pallav Gupta. The film stars Srabanti in lead role.

== Plot ==
This is the journey of Sarmista, an upright and honest investigative journalist, and her fight for the truth through the web of media politics. She braves through various situations to capture news at great personal risk, only to realize, to her disbelief, that the channel won't telecast her report.

== Cast ==
- Srabanti Chatterjee as Sharmistha
- Sujoy Ghosh
- Moushumi Chatterjee as Elina
- Partha Sarathi Deb as Alok

== Music ==
Sesh Sangbad

Soundtrack album by Amit Sur
- Released: March 2016
- Recorded: June 2016
- Genre: Feature film soundtrack
- Label: Eros Music
- Producer: Eros Now

The album is composed by Amit Sur.

No.	Title	Singer(s)	Length
1.	"Mahi Ve"	Zubeen Garg	02:30
2.	"Harbo Na"	Ujjaini Mukherjee	06:09
3.	"Pram Bhoriya"	Saheb Chatterjee	04:46
4.	"Dhulomakha Canvas"	Somlata Acharya Chowdhury	06:17
5.	"Dada Re"	Shibashish Danda	05:16
