= Khiladi (2013 film) =

2013 Indian Bengali-language romantic action comedy film

- Theatrical release poster
- Directed by: Ashok Pati
- Screenplay by: Pele
- Story by: B. V. S. Ravi Udayakrishnan Sibi K. Thomas
- Produced by: Ashok Dhanuka; Himanshu Dhanuka
- Starring: Ankush Hazra; Nusrat Jahan; Tapas Paul; Laboni Sarkar
- Cinematography: Baba Yadav; D. Shankariya
- Edited by: M. Susmit
- Music by: Shree Pritam
- Production company: Eskay Movies
- Release date: 11 October 2013 (Kolkata)
- Running time: 135 minutes
- Country: India
- Language: Bengali

Khiladi is a 2013 Indian Bengali action drama film directed by Ashok Pati and produced by Ashok Dhanuka and Himanshu Dhanuka under the banner of Eskay Movies. It features Ankush Hazra and Nusrat Jahan in the lead roles and the music of the film has been composed by Shree Pritam. It is a remake of the 2012 Telugu film Denikaina Ready which itself was a remake of the 1999 Malayalam film Udayapuram Sulthan. The film released on 11 October 2013 and marked the final film of Tapas Paul before his death.

== Plot ==
Aditya Choudhury is a faction leader in Kurnool who raised his sister Saraswati with love and affection to make her forget the loss of their mother. During the marriage time, she eloped with Mohsin Khan, whom she loved which led to the death of Aditya's father. Thus enraged Aditya cuts the leg of Mohsin which created a rift between the two families. On a case to win the property belonging to Saraswati, Mohsin wins the case against Aditya after a long gap of 25 years. Seeing the sorrow of Saraswati, her son Sulaiman vows to unite the two families and waits for a situation.

Meanwhile, on a suggestion by Pulok Purohit, Aditya appoints his manager Dayashankar Bal to find a great scholar to perform a "Shanti Yogga". He contacts a scholar but as he was unavailable, he goes to the college of the scholar's son (who is also a scholar). The boy named Krishna Bhattacharya, in a fit of rage (as his love interest Aparna is close to Michael because of Sulaiman), shows Sulaiman to Dayashankar and tells him that he is Krishna but prefers to be called as Sulaiman. Though initially, he refuses to accept, Sulaiman accepts that he is Krishna as this would be a golden chance to unite the two families. He, along with his friend Michael and a group of Bramhins goes to the palace of Aditya.

There he manages to act well, only to be noticed by Puja, the adopted daughter of Aditya. Though she tries to make his true colours screened (i.e. he is not a scholar), he escapes by his wit and timing. In an unexpected situation, Dayashankar visits Krishna's home to pay his father but shockingly he finds out the truth that Sulaiman is acting as Krishna. Having a fear of getting murdered by Aditya, if he discloses the facts and wants the "yogga" to be completed as soon as possible. Sulaiman, though interested in Puja, finds his mother's wish much important and starts playing various plans to intimate feelings of Saraswati in Aditya's heart but all go vain. Meanwhile, Aditya's opponent Natawar Mondal attacks Puja but Sulaiman saves her. Puja falls for him and Aditya feels that the attack was done by Mohsin.

Now for Sulaiman, things go much worse as Jhimli (the daughter of Dayashankar and the girl who is loved by Krishna) returns to the palace, proposes to him, and warns him that if he refuses to love her, she would reveal the Secret. Meanwhile, Pulok Purohit, who is in deep frustration as Dayashankar made him not to perform the "Yogga", wants to take revenge on him. Sulaiman plays a very clever game to hide his skin playing with the weaknesses of everyone. Everything goes smooth till Puja tells about her proposal of marriage with Krishna to her dad and her dad sends his brothers to talk with Krishna's parents. Sulaiman reveals his identity to Puja and sets to Krishna's House. There too he plays a game with the weaknesses of Krishna's mother so that she would refer to Sulaiman as her son before Aditya's sons. Things get on the right path and marriage planning activities took place on full swing.

Natawar Mondal's son wants to marry Puja so that he can torture her to the core. This plan disturbs him and Natawar Mondal threatens Aditya to leave her or else his son aka Krishna would be killed. Thus Aditya summons Krishna and finds that he neither loved Puja nor he performed the "Yogga". Sulaiman enters the scene, plays a game again, forces to misrepresent Sulaiman as Krishna at that place. Sulaiman makes Aditya invite Saraswati to the marriage and Mohsin says that he would come to the marriage only for Puja. Thus when the family along with Sulaiman visits the temple, Natawar Mondal attacks Aditya's family and Sulaiman makes a call to Mohsin that he has been attacked. Mohsin reaches there with his men and in an emotional juncture, he saves Aditya's family and Aditya saves Saraswati. After knowing the truth that Sulaiman acted as Krishna, he asks about the reason for the fraud and Sulaiman tells that it was to unite the two families. Thus the two families unite and Sulaiman marries Puja.

== Cast ==
- Ankush Hazra as Sulaiman (Saraswati's son) / Krishna Bhattacharya
- Nusrat Jahan as Puja, Aditya's adopted daughter
- Tapas Paul as Aditya Choudhury
- Laboni Sarkar as Saraswati, Aditya's sister
- Rajatava Dutta as Mohsin Ali Khan, Saraswati's husband
- Kanchan Mullick as Pulok Purohit
- Kharaj Mukherjee as Dayashankar Bal, Aditya's manager
- Partho Sarathi Chakraborty as Michael, Krishna's friend
- Supriyo Datta as Natawar Mondal
- Aritra Dutta Banik, Bhola Tamang as Bramhin priests

== Making ==
The filming of Khiladi started on 18 May 2013. According to the director, apart from being a typical comedy film, Khiladi also has a social message for its viewers.

== Soundtrack ==
Khiladi

Soundtrack album by Shree Pritam
- Released: 2013
- Genre: Feature film soundtrack
- Length: 20:40
- Label: Eskay Movies

Shree Pritam chronology
Khoka 420 (2013)	Khiladi (2013)

Shree Pritam composed the music for Khiladi.

=== Track listing ===
No.	Title	Singer(s)	Length
1.	"Ki Diya"	Zubeen Garg	3:33
2.	"Pagol Ami Already"	Zubeen Garg, Mahalaxmi Iyer	4:06
3.	"Heartbeat"	Baba Sehgal, Saberi Bhattacharya	3:52
4.	"Jay Dugga Thakur"	Shree Pritam & Jolly Das	4:24
5.	"O Humsafar"	Shaan & Palak Muchhal	4:45
Total length:			20:40
