= Romeo vs Juliet =

- Directed by: Ashok Pati; Abdul Aziz
- Written by: Sudipto Sarkar; Pele Bhattacharya
- Produced by: Ashok Dhanuka; Abdul Aziz
- Starring: Joey Debroy; Ankush Hazra; Mahiya Mahi
- Cinematography: Yuvraj
- Edited by: Sudipto Sarkar; M. Susmit
- Music by: Savvy Gupta; Akassh Sen
- Production companies: Eskay Movies (India); Jaaz Multimedia (Bangladesh)
- Distributed by: Eskay Movies; Jaaz Multimedia
- Release date: 16 January 2015
- Countries: Bangladesh; India
- Language: Bengali
- Budget: ₹3 crore (equivalent to ₹4.5 crore or US$540,000 in 2023)
- Box office: ₹7 crore (equivalent to ₹11 crore or US$1.2 million in 2023)

Romeo vs Juliet is a 2015 Indo-Bangladesh joint production romantic comedy film directed by Ashok Pati. The cast includes Indian actors Ankush Hazra, Joey Debroy and Bangladeshi actress Mahiya Mahi. It was produced by Eskay Movies and co-produced by Jaaz Multimedia. The film was released on 16 January 2015.

It is a remake of the 2013 Indian Punjabi-language film Singh vs Kaur.

== Cast ==
- Mahiya Mahi as Juliet
- Ankush Hazra as Romeo
- Joey Debroy as Rahul
- Nita Mistry as Anu
- Kabila
- Kharaj Mukherjee
- Supriyo Dutta as Morol
- Ali Raj
- Tulika Basu
- Partho Sarathi Chakraborty
- Tanveer Khan
- Rebecca
- Ujjol Pm
- Lola Williams
- Abigail Hopkins as Desdemona

== Soundtrack ==
Romeo vs Juliet

Soundtrack album by Savvy Gupta and Akassh Sen
- Released: 25 December 2014
- Recorded: 2014
- Genre: Feature film soundtrack
- Length: 20:10
- Language: Bengali
- Label: Eskay Music; Jaaz Music
- Producer: Ashok Dhanuka; Abdul Aziz

Savvy Gupta chronology
Yoddha: The Warrior (2014)	Romeo vs Juliet (2014)	Ekla Cholo (2015)

Akassh Sen chronology
Action (2014)	Romeo vs Juliet (2015)

The soundtrack of the film was scored by Savvy Gupta and Akassh Sen.

Track	Song	Singer(s)	Duration	Music	Lyricist
1.	"Bekheyali Mone"	Shadaab Hashmi	4:35	Savvy	Riddhi Barua/Savvy
2.	"Mai Tera Romeo Tu Meri Juliet (Title Track)"	Akassh	3:16	Akassh	Priyo Chattopadhyay
3.	"Mahiya Mahiya"	Arindom Chatterjee	3:48	Savvy	Savvy
4.	"Sohag Chand Badoni"	Akassh	3:33	Akassh	Priyo Chattopadhyay
5.	"Saiyaan"	Zubeen Garg, Akriti Kakkar	4:59	Savvy	Prasen

== Reception ==
A review in The Times of India gave Romeo vs Juliet one star out of five. It praised the beauty of the London locations, but criticized the absurd plot and a cast that "performs like they are part of an open-air jatra performance".
