= Shikari (2016 film) =

2016 action thriller film

- Theatrical Poster
- Directed by: Joydip Mukherjee; Zakir Hossain Simanto
- Written by: Pele Bhattacharya; Abdullah Zahir Babu
- Screenplay by: Pele Bhattacharya; Abdullah Zahir Babu
- Story by: Ramesh Khanna
- Produced by: Abdul Aziz; Himanshu Dhanuka (co-producer)
- Starring: Shakib Khan; Srabanti Chatterjee; Rahul Dev; Sabyasachi Chakrabarty; Amit Hasan
- Cinematography: Tuban
- Edited by: Somnath Dey
- Music by: Indraadip Dasgupta
- Production companies: Jaaz Multimedia; Eskay Movies
- Distributed by: Jaaz Multimedia; Eskay Movies
- Release dates: 7 July 2016 (Bangladesh); 12 August 2016 (Worldwide)
- Running time: 160 minutes
- Countries: Bangladesh; India
- Language: Bengali
- Box office: ৳9.55 crore (equivalent to ৳16 crore or US$1.3 million in 2024)

Shikari (transl. Hunter) is a 2016 Bangladeshi-Indian joint venture action thriller film directed by Joydip Mukherjee and Zakir Hossain Simanto. It was produced by Abdul Aziz and co-produced by Himanshu Dhanuka under the Jaaz Multimedia and Eskay Movies banners. It stars Shakib Khan, Srabanti Chatterjee, Rahul Dev and Sabyasachi Chakrabarty in pivotal roles and centers around Khan, a disguised professional assassin with a mysterious past, tasked with assassinating a top government official. The film also features Lily Chakravarty, Amit Hasan, Kharaj Mukherjee, and Supriyo Dutta in supporting roles. The soundtrack album and background score of the film have been composed by Indraadip Dasgupta.

A collaborative Jaaz-Eskay project involving Khan was first reported during mid-2014. However, the project was later shelved due to the unavailability of the actor. The film was originally planned to be a multi-starrer film in numerous media reports. Eskay Movies and Jaaz Multimedia intended to begin production of the film again after revisions in the script. The production was officially announced by Eskay and Jaaz in January 2016, and Zakir Hossain Simanto and Joydip Mukherjee were hired as directors. Some of the film and songs were shot in London.

== Release and Reception ==
The film was released in Bangladesh on 7 July 2016 and became the 2nd highest-grossing Bangladeshi film of 2016. For the film, Khan won his eighth Meril-Prothom Alo Awards for Best Actor and was nominated in the Critics' Choice Best Actor category.

It is an official remake of the 2009 Tamil film Aadhavan which was itself inspired by the 1990 Malayalam film His Highness Abdullah.

== Plot ==
Sultan is a professional assassin who had run away from home in his childhood after being convicted of attempting to murder his father. Dev Roy, an influential child trafficker, hires Sultan to kill prominent Judge Rudro Chowdhury, since he is handling the inquiry and verdict on Dev Roy's child trafficking case in Kolkata. Sultan arrives in Kolkata and attempts to murder Judge Chowdhury by sniping, but misfires due to a large crowd and media around the Judge. The West Bengal Police force chases after him, but ultimately fails to catch him. After Dev Roy insults him for his inability, Sultan is angry with himself, and vows to kill Judge Chowdhury within ten days.

Sultan enters Judge Chowdhury's household disguised as a servant, and slowly begins to win over the members of the family.

== Cast ==
- Shakib Khan as Raghob Chowdhury / Sultan / Raghu / fake Hridoy / Hridoyharan
- Srabanti Chatterjee as Chhutki / Riya
- Rahul Dev as Rahul Dev Roy, a corrupt doctor involved in organ trafficking
- Sabyasachi Chakrabarty as Rudro Chowdhury, Raghu's father, a judge appointed by CBI to investigate about organ trafficking in West Bengal
- Rebeka Rouf as Chowdhury's wife, Raghu's mother
- Lily Chakravarty as Raghu's grandmother
- Amit Hasan as IPS Rudro
- Supriyo Dutta as Abdul Ansari/Abbu
- Kharaj Mukherjee as Teenkori
- Subrata
- Rajib Banerjee
- Alokananda Guha
- Parthasarathi Chakraborty as Bappy Man
- Prashanta Samanta
- Shiba Shanu as security guard Khan
- Dr. Sohail Babu
- Mousumi Saha

== Production ==
=== Casting and development ===
The project was first announced in January 2016 with an official statement by Jaaz Multimedia. Srabanti Chatterjee was signed to play the female lead opposite Khan in the film. The film was made official in a press conference held in Dhaka on 7 March 2016, where the cast members of the film were introduced.

=== Filming ===
The shooting schedule of Shikari commenced on 14 March 2016. The first phase of the film was shot in 12-day schedule and entirely filmed in Kolkata. The second phase of the filming took place in London. The last phase of the film was filmed in Dhaka, and lasted 26-days. The entire film was shot on a 48-day schedule. During filming, the shooting was halted for 2-days in Kolkata due to strike from the production crew.

The music of the film was shot at various locations in London and Kolkata. A romantic track sequence was shot at Beachy Head in East Sussex, England while other sequences were shot at Piccadilly Circus.

== Release ==
The film also released in North America and Europe on 12 August 2016.

=== Promotions ===
Promotion of Shikari began on 16 June 2016 with the release of "Harabo Toke Niye" on YouTube. The track featured Shakib Khan, Srabanti Chatterjee and the track was shot in London. The video received an overwhelming response on YouTube, and became the fastest Bengali-language video track to reach 1 million views. The track received praise from the audience and critics. The official teaser of the film was revealed on 18 June 2016 and instantly became the top trend online for 24 hours. Khan's new look and the action sequences were praised. Promotions officially began with a press conference on 22 June 2016, where the film's cast and crew were present.

== Soundtrack ==
The soundtrack of Shikari was released worldwide on 12 August 2016.

Shikari

Soundtrack album by Indraadip Dasgupta
- Released: 12 August 2016
- Genre: Feature film soundtrack
- Language: Bengali
- Labels: Jaaz Music; Eskay Music
- Producers: Abdul Aziz; Himanshu Dhanuka

Indraadip Dasgupta chronology
Kelor Kirti (2016)	Shikari (2016)	Haripada Bandwala (2016)

Singles from Shikari: Original Motion Picture Soundtrack
- 1. "Harabo Toke" Released: 16 June 2016

All music is composed by Indraadip Dasgupta.

Track Listing:
No.	Title	Lyrics	Music	Singer(s)	Length
1.	"Harabo Toke"	Prasen (Prasenjit Mukherjee) and Arijit Chowdhury	Indraadip Dasgupta	Shaan	4:45
2.	"Mamo Chittey (Duet Version)" (Original Tune: Rabindranath Tagore)	Rabindranath Tagore	Indraadip Dasgupta	Arijit Singh and Madhuraa Bhattacharya	3:55
3.	"Uth Chhuri Tor Biye Hobe"	Prasen	Indraadip Dasgupta	Nakash Aziz and Madhubanti Bagchi	4:29
4.	"Ar Kono Kotha Na Bole"	Prasen	Indraadip Dasgupta	Arijit Singh and Madhubanti Bagchi	4:30
5.	"Mamo Chittey (Solo Version)" (Original Tune: Rabindranath Tagore)	Rabindranath Tagore	Indraadip Dasgupta	Arijit Singh	3:55
Total length:					21:56

== Accolades ==
Award Ceremony	Category	Section	Nominee	Result	Ref
Meril Prothom Alo Awards	Best Actor	People's Choice	Shakib Khan	Won	
Meril Prothom Alo Awards	Best Actor	Critics choice	Shakib Khan	Nominated	
Kalakar Awards	Best Film		Shikari	Won	
Kalakar Awards	Best Actress		Srabanti Chatterjee	Won	
Tele Cine Awards	Best Actor (Bangladesh)		Shakib Khan	Won	
Filmfare Awards East	Best Choreography		"Uth Chhuri Tor Biye Hobe"	Nominated	
