= Wanted (2010 film) =

2010 Indian action thriller film

- Theatrical release poster
- Directed by: Ravi Kinagi
- Screenplay by: Ravi Kinnagi; Anonno Mamun
- Dialogues by: Poulomi Bhowmik
- Story by: Trivikram Srinivas
- Produced by: Ashok Dhanuka; Himanshu Dhanuka
- Starring: Jeet; Srabanti Chatterjee; Sharad Kapoor; Biswajit Chakraborty
- Cinematography: P. Selva Kumar
- Edited by: Rabi Ranjan Maitra
- Music by: Rajesh Roy
- Production company: Eskay Movies
- Distributed by: Eskay Movies
- Release date: 30 April 2010
- Running time: 153 minutes
- Country: India
- Language: Bengali

Wanted is a 2010 Indian Bengali-language action thriller film directed by Ravi Kinagi. Produced by Ashok Dhanuka under the banner of Eskay Movies, the film is a remake of 2005 Telugu movie Athadu. It stars Jeet and Srabanti Chatterjee in the lead roles, while Sharad Kapoor, Biswajit Chakraborty, Kharaj Mukherjee and Kaushik Banerjee play other pivotal roles.

The film began production in October 2009 and was officially announced on 30 November 2009, on the occasion of Jeet's birthday, also marking the 6th collaboration between Jeet and Kinnagi. The screenplay and dialogues of the film were written by Ananyo Mamun and Poulomi Bhowmik respectively, with the soundtrack and background score composed by Rajesh Roy. The film was predominantly shot in Kolkata, with portions shot in Bolpur, Purulia, Bankura and Guwahati; and foreign countries like Dubai, London and Switzerland. The soundtrack and background score of the film were composed by Rajesh Roy. The screenplay and dialogues of the film were written by Kinnagi, Anonno Mamun and Poulomi Bhowmik respectively. It had cinematography handled by P. Sylva Kumar, editing by Rabi Ranjan Maitra and action sequences designed by Judo Ramu.

Clashing with Soham Chakraborty starrer Amanush, the film released on 30 April 2010. It was declared to be a blockbuster at the box office with a 60 week long run in theatres. Wanted gained a cult status in the history of Bengali Cinema. It marked the beginning of a new image of Jeet, that of an action hero, for which he became lovable to the masses in an eventual manner. The film received several accolades including three Zee Bangla Gourab Somman Awards and a Kalakar Awards.

== Plot ==
In Chalsa, Rajkumar Banerjee alias Raja, kills the notorious gangster duo Killu and Billu who were considered to be the 'Terror of Chalsa' because they murdered his parents, when he was at the age group of 15. He escapes to Kolkata and joins the gang of Sadhu, another crime boss and gets the company of Joy. After a big bank burglary at night, Sadhu gets arrested by the Kolkata Police as his right-hand man Aslaam betrayed him by calling the police and making them know about all the plans of Sadhu. But in jail, Raja kills the officer who accompanied Aslaam and runs away with Joy.

After being grown up, Raja does the daylight murder of Aslaam at a bazaar in Kidderpore fulfilling his revenge and escapes with Joy. On the other hand, Amarnath Ganguly is a party leader who wants to stage his own attempted assassination to garner the sympathy vote in the upcoming election. His colleague Shubhankar Banerjee hooks him up with Raja. Raja demands ₹1.50 crores for the false murder. In the meeting ceremony, near Ballygunge railway station, where the assassination was to happen, Ganguly is shot by someone else. Police immediately identify the unprepared housing complex from where the assassination took place and surround the skyscraper. Raja is about to exit the building when there is a car accident with his car. Raja assumes that Joy has died in the accident. Raja goes to the top of the building with the police in pursuit. A passing train through Ballygunge station, offers Raja an escape with a rope to land on the train.

In the train, Raja meets Shibu who reveals that he ran away from his village, Ganganagar, when he was young; he is now returning to his village. When the train was at the Kharagpur railway station, the police site Raja but shoot Shibu. Raja escapes to Ganganagar to inform them about Shibu's death, but Shibu's family believes Raja to be their son and accepts him. Pooja, with whom Shibu's marriage was to happen, falls in love with Raja.

A CBI officer, Salim Ali Khan is investigating Ganguly's murder, believes that Raja is responsible, and comes across the Raja/Shibu connection. He tries getting "Raja's" fingerprints but is outsmarted. Clues implicate Joy. There is in Ganganagar a wedding of "Shibu's" niece. The CBI comes to believe there has been a Raja/Shibu change, and Raga is a murder suspect. Raja flees, the CBI leave, and he returns to explain what is going on. The family shows no interest in helping Raja to find the real assassin but his grandfather gives Raja a gun.

Raja calls Shubhankar Banerjee and demands to know who killed Ganguly. Banerjee refuses but Raja tells him that their conversation has been recorded, and Banerjee reveals everything. Joy killed Ganguly for Rs. 20 million. He faked his death by sending a drunkard in the car at the time of the accident. Raja leaves for the old church, where Joy is. Raja and Joy meet and Raja has the gun loaded before Joy. But the same policemen who killed Shibu barge in. Raja kills them all, including Joy. Raja gives the recording to CBI officer Khan. Then Khan goes directly to Banerjee's office, tells him that he will hand him over to the police, and Banerjee tells him that he has no concrete evidence. Khan reveals the recording is evidence enough for Ganguly's hot-headed son, who has vowed vengeance for his father's death. Trapped without any recourse, Banerjee commits suicide. Then Raja releases Shibu's ashes and Salim Khan lets him go to Shibu's family and gives him the condition to reject the crime world to lead a happy life with Pooja. Raja agrees to it and starts his journey to Ganganagar, where he stays forever.

== Cast ==
- Jeet as Rajkumar Banerjee aka sharp-shooter Raja / False Shibu
  - Anshu Bach as young Raja
- Srabanti Chatterjee as Pooja, Raja's love interest
- Sharad Kapoor as CBI Officer Salim Ali Khan
- Rajat Ganguly as politician Amarnath Ganguly
- Biplab Chatterjee as Shubhankar Banerjee, Ganguly's assistant
- Atanu Mukherjee as Shibranjan Chowdhury alias Shibu
- Biswajit Chakraborty as Siddhartha Narayan Choudhury, Shibu's grandfather
- Kamalika Banerjee as Shibu's paternal aunt
- Indrajit Chakraborty as Joy
- Joy Badlani as Sadhu
- Kharaj Mukherjee as Shibu's paternal uncle
- Aritra Dutta Banik as Puchke, Shibu's cousin
- Rajanya Mitra as Shibu's sister
- Ayesha Bhattacharya as Shibu's younger sister
- Moushumi Das as prostitute
- Tanuka Chatterjee as Shibu's mother
- Shyamal Dutta as CBI Chief
- Beas Dhar

== Soundtrack ==
Wanted

Soundtrack album by Rajesh Roy
- Genre: Feature film soundtrack
- Length: 22:43
- Language: Bengali
- Label: Eskay Music

Official audio
- Wanted – Full Album on YouTube

The music album of the film is composed by Rajesh Roy. The lyrics have been written by Gautam Sushmit, Sumit Acharya, Priyo Chattopadhyay and Rajesh Roy.

Track listing
No.	Title	Lyrics	Singer(s)	Length
1.	"Neka Neka"	Gautam Susmit	Shaan; Manjeera Ganguly	04:40
2.	"Koro Selam"	Sumit Acharya	Kunal Ganjawala; Rajesh Roy; Kalpana	03:09
3.	"Aaha"	Priyo Chatterjee	Pritha Majumder; Ananya Wadkar; Rajesh Roy	04:25
4.	"Akhno Jano"	Rajesh Roy	Kunal Ganjawala; Pritha Majumder	03:33
5.	"Cholo Kheli Prem Prem"			04:22
Total length:				22:43

== Critical response ==
Amrita Roy Choudhury of The Times of India gave the film a rating of 3.5/5 stars and wrote "Wanted has all the right ingredients – stylised action sequences (certainly new to the Bengali audience), a gripping narrative backed by solid performances, a powerful presentation technique and an extremely well packaging, to top it all. Jeet proves once again that he is a seasoned actor who has gotten better with time. Srabanti looks cute as the chulbuli Pooja, who falls hook, line and sinker for Raja whom she assumes to be gramer paliye jaoya chhele, Shibu. Kharaj does a fabulous job as the funnyman and even before he opened his mouth, the audience was in splits. Another surprise in the film comes in the form of Sharad Kapoor aka Salim Khan, the CBI officer whose only weakness is good-looking women. His character too is well-etched out and adds that extra zing to the narrative."
