= Dujone =

2009 Indian Bengali romance film by Rajiv Kumar Biswas

- Directed by: Rajiv Kumar Biswas
- Screenplay by: Rajiv Kumar Biswas
- Dialogues by: Moloy Banerjee
- Produced by: Ashok Dhanuka
- Starring: Dev; Srabanti Chatterjee; Arun Bannerjee; Debesh Roy Chowdhury; Kharaj Mukherjee
- Cinematography: Manoj Mishra
- Edited by: Rabi Ranjan Maitra
- Music by: Songs: Jeet Gannguli; Background score: S. P. Venkatesh
- Production company: Eskay Movies
- Distributed by: Eskay Movies
- Release date: 17 September 2009
- Running time: 148 minutes
- Country: India
- Language: Bengali
- Budget: est. ₹2 crore
- Box office: est. ₹6.8 crore

Dujone (Bengali pronunciation: [duˈd͡ʒone]; transl. The Two) is a 2009 Indian Bengali-language romantic action film directed by Rajiv Kumar Biswas in his directorial debut. Produced by Ashok Dhanuka under the banner of Eskay Movies, the film stars Dev and Srabanti Chatterjee in lead roles, with Arun Bannerjee, Debesh Roy Chowdhury, Kharaj Mukherjee, Nandini Chatterjee, Mousumi Saha, Seema Biswas and Arijit Dutta in supporting roles.

The film plots a love story between Akash and Meghna, belonged to different backgrounds, which is opposed by their families, leading to Akash's father to hire a contract killer to eliminate Meghna. Announced in December 2008, the film marks Biswas's first collaboration with Dev, and pairs Dev and Srabanti for the first time. Predominantly shot in Kolkata, Siliguri and Sikkim, with additional filming in Switzerland and Houston, over a span of five months. Jeet Gannguli composed its soundtrack, while S. P. Venkatesh provided its score, with lyrics penned by Gautam Sushmit and Priyo Chattopadhyay.

Dujone was theatrically released worldwide on 17 September 2009, opening to highly positive reviews. Emerged as a hit, grossing over ₹6.8 crore against a budget of ₹2 crore the film is noted to be the first Bengali film with Digital Intermediate technology.

== Plot ==
Akash is the son of a multimillionaire in Kolkata. He is very much addicted to sports rather than education in college. On the other hand, Meghna, the first girl of his class, shows hatred towards Akash due to his beliefs about this. She is the daughter of a fisherman. Over a period of time, her hatred turns into love. Finally, he falls in love with her too, but their parents do not agree to their marriage. Their parents plan to avoid their marriage by giving the couple a clause that they should not meet each other for one year. If their love remains even after one year, then their parents will agree to their marriage.

Akash's father puts him under house arrest in Siliguri, while Meghna's father takes her to his hometown and arranges her marriage with another man. However, both Akash and Meghna manage to escape. They reach a garden where they spend a lot of days working for money. But Akash's father sends goons to bring back his son. In the end, both of them get married in front of the Legislative Assembly, where the whole college comes to support them.

== Cast ==
- Dev as Akash Banerjee
- Srabanti Chatterjee as Meghna
- Arun Bannerjee as Mr. Banerjee, Akash's father
- Debesh Roy Chowdhury as Shankar, Meghna's father
- Kharaj Mukherjee
- Nandini Chatterjee as Mrs. Sen
- Mousumi Saha as Meghna's mother
- Seema Biswas as Meghna's aunt
- Dwijen Banerjee as Manohar,
- Ramaprasad Banik as the principal of Pailan College
- Debjani Mukherjee
- Arijit Dutta as Pandit
- Rintu Dey as Sunil, Akash's friend
- Pradip Dhar as the announcer in the sports meet
- Atanu Mukherjee as Das, Mr. Banerjee's manager

== Soundtrack ==
Dujone

Soundtrack album to Dujone by Jeet Gannguli
- Released: 2009
- Genre: Feature Film Soundtrack
- Length: 27:54
- Language: Bengali
- Label: Eskay Music
- Producer: Jeet Gannguli

Jeet Gannguli chronology
Krodh (2009)	Dujone (2009)	Thana Theke Aschi (2010)
External audio
- Dujone Audio Jukebox on YouTube

Jeet Gannguli composed the soundtrack in his first collaboration with Biswas and sixth with Dev, after working on I Love You (2007), Premer Kahini (2008), Mon Mane Na (2008), Challenge (2009) and Paran Jai Jaliya Re (2009). The album contains six tracks, penned by Gautam Sushmit and Priyo Chattopadhyay.

Track listing
No.	Title	Lyrics	Singer(s)	Length
1.	"Rama Ho"	Priyo Chattopadhyay	Dipendu Mukherjee	3:20
2.	"Bodhua"	Gautam Sushmit	Zubeen Garg, Monali Thakur	5:03
3.	"Kar Chokhe"	Priyo Chattopadhyay	Zubeen Garg, Monali Thakur	4:50
4.	"Bodhua (sad version)"	Gautam Sushmit	Zubeen Garg	6:17
5.	"Sonali Roddure"	Gautam Sushmit	Shaan, Monali Thakur	4:57
6.	"Dujone title track"	Priyo Chattopadhyay	Jeet Gannguli, June Banerjee	3:25
Total length:				27:54

== Release ==
Dujone had its release on 17 September 2009 with in 126 theatres in West Bengal. It had at least 235 shows from second week, which eventually increased later. On 18 September 2009, it was screened in 25 theatres across Mumbai, Bihar, Odisha, Assam and Tripura, also worldwidely including Chicago, Miami, San Francisco, Houston and New Jersey.
