= Saayoni Ghosh =

Indian actress, singer, politician

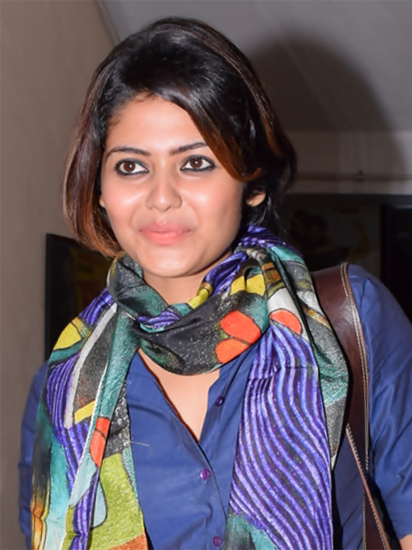
- Ghosh in 2015

Member of Parliament, Lok Sabha
- Incumbent
- Assumed office 4 June 2024
- Preceded by: Mimi Chakraborty
- Constituency: Jadavpur

President of Trinamool Youth Congress
- In office 5 June 2021 – 13 June 2026
- Preceded by: Abhishek Banerjee
- Succeeded by: Arnab Banerjee

Personal details
- Party: Nationalist Citizens Party of India
- Other political affiliations: Trinamool Congress (2021–2026)
- Committees: Member, Committee on Housing and Urban Affairs since 2024 September
- Born: Sayani Ghosh; 27 January 1993 (age 33); Kolkata, West Bengal, India
- Education: Hirendra Leela Patranavis School
- Occupations: Actress; Politician; Singer
- Years active: 2010–present
- Awards: TTIS Best Actor Award 2010; Mirchi Music Award Bangla, 2012

Saayoni Ghosh (born 27 January 1993) is an Indian actress, singer and politician. She is known for her works in Bengali film and television industry. She is currently serving as a Member of Parliament representing Jadavpur parliamentary constituency.

== Career ==
Her acting debut was with a telefilm Ichhe Dana, and her first appearance on the big screen was in a short role in the film Notobor Notout. She then shared the screen with some veteran actors in Raj Chakraborty's Shotru, and later played a carefree journalist role in Raj Chakraborty's daily serial Proloy Asche. She has played lead roles in the films Kanamachi, Antaraal, Ekla Cholo, Amar Sahor, Bitnoon, Mayer Biye, Rajkahini.

Ghosh also co-hosted the Calcutta Football League in 2013 and 2014 for Jalsha Movies during Live telecast.

== Political career ==
She joined Trinamool Congress on 24 February 2021. In March 2021, she was announced to be Trinamool Congress’s candidate for the Asansol South constituency in the 2021 West Bengal Legislative Assembly election. But, she was defeated by BJP's candidate Agnimitra Paul.

She was appointed the "president of the youth wing of Trinamool Congress" in June-2021, after Abhishek Banerjee had been relieved of the duty. The Enforcement Directorate had questioned her on 30 June 2023 for 11 hours, in connection with its investigation into the 2022 West Bengal School Service Commission recruitment scam. In the 2024 Indian general election, she contested and won from Jadavpur Lok Sabha constituency as a Trinamool candidate, with a margin of more than 2.5 lakhs votes.

=== 2026 Rebellion ===
In June 2026, almost immediately after the massive Trinamool Congress defeat, around 20 MPs of TMC including Yusuf Pathan, Saayoni Ghosh, Shatrughan Sinha, Bapi Halder, Mala Roy, Mitali Bag, Deepak Adhikari, Arup Chakraborty, Sharmila Sarkar, Satabdi Roy, Rachna Banerjee, Prasun Banerjee and others, allegedly declared rebellion from their Party, and presented their written wish to join NDA. This group was led by Kakoli Ghosh.

Later, on 14 June 20 MPs, including Saayoni Ghosh, signed a formal letter declaring their split from Trinamool Congress as to merge with the Nationalist Citizen Party of India (NCPI). They formally submitted the letter to Lok Sabha Speaker Om Birla.

The total strength of TMC in Lok Sabha had been 28, so that a number of 20 MPS made it eligible for splitting from the Party, as per the Indian Defection laws, so as to escape the anti-defection disqualification.

== Controversies ==
- On 21 November 2021, Ghosh was arrested by the Tripura Police while campaigning for the Trinamool Congress in Agartala. She was charged with attempt to murder and promoting enmity between groups, following allegations that she tried to drive her vehicle into a gathering of Bharatiya Janata Party (BJP) supporters at a rally attended by Tripura Chief Minister Biplab Kumar Deb. According to the first information report, Ghosh and her associates allegedly used offensive language, threw stones at the crowd, and caused panic among attendees, resulting in minor injuries to some BJP workers.
- In 2021, an old tweet from Ghosh’s Twitter account dating back to February 2015 resurfaced and sparked controversy. The tweet featured an image of a condom being placed on a Shivling, a sacred Hindu symbol, and was posted around the time of Maha Shivratri. The post was widely criticized as offensive and disrespectful by several individuals and groups. Former Tripura Governor Tathagata Roy filed a police complaint against Ghosh in Kolkata, alleging that the tweet hurt religious sentiments. Ghosh responded by stating that her account had been hacked at the time and issued an apology for the content.
- On 4 January 2024 Saayoni attended in a public meeting in Bardhaman and claimed that Mamata Banerjee founded the historic Curzon Gate as a part of development. This statement was highly criticised by the opposition political leaders.
- She was investigated by the Enforcement Directorate over her alleged involvement in 2022 West Bengal School Service Commission recruitment scam, and on 30 June 2024, she was questioned by ED officials for 10 hours.

== Filmography ==
Key
Denotes films that have not yet been released

Year	Film	Role	Notes
2010	Notobor Notout		
2011	Shotru	Puja's sister	
2013	Kanamachi		
2013	Alik Sukh	Namita	
2013	Antaraal		
2013	Aagun		
2014	Golpo Holeo Shotti	Smitha	
2014	Punascha		
2014	Aranyadeb		
2015	Ekla Cholo	Riya	
2015	Bodhon		
2015	Bitnoon	Rusha	
2015	Choukaath- The Threshold		
2015	Bawal	Nusrat	
2015	Natoker Moto - Like a Play	Kheya's Friend	
2015	Aro Ekbar		
2015	Mayer Biye		
2015	Babar Naam Gandhiji	Trina	
2015	Hashite Hashiona		
2015	Rajkahini	Koli	
2016	Abaar Ekla Cholo		
2016	Byomkesh O Chiriyakhana	Mukul	
2016	Kiriti Roy		
2017	Meghnad Badh Rahasya	Elena	
2017	Amar Sahor		
2017	AndarKahini		
2017	Chalo Let's Live		
2017	Kichu Na Bola Kotha		
2018	Jojo		
2018	Ka Kha Ga Gha		
2018	Good Night City		
2018	Reunion		
2019	Dwikhondito		
2019	Ke Tumi Nandini		
2019	Wrong Number		
2019	Adda		
2019	Atithi		
2019	Shakkhi-Jaha Bolibo Shotti Bolibo		
2019	Network		
2019	Brombhodoityo		
2019	Sanjhbati	Shyamali	
2020	Pratidwandi		
2020	Dracula Sir	Romila	small appearance as a film actress
2022	Aparajito	Bimala Ray, Aparajito's wife	
2022	City of Jackals		
2022	Uttwaraan		
2023	Rahsymoy		
2023	Lal: Suitcase Ta Dekhechhen?		

== Web series ==
- Pocketmaar (Paranoia Series 3rd episode) - 31 December 2017
- Charitraheen - 29 September 2018
- Bou Keno Psycho - 21 February 2019
- Astey Ladies! - 15 March 2019
- Charitraheen 2–29 June 2019
- Rahasya Romancho Series- Season 1
- Rahasya Romancho Series- Season 3
- Abar Proloy

=== Web films ===
- Teen Cup Chaa - (2018)

== Television ==
- Ichhe Dana (Guest Appearance) Star Jalsha
- Aparajita Star Jalsha
- Proloy Aschhe Sananda Tv
- Josh Sananda Tv
- Care Kori Na Star Jalsha
- Bhasha Star Jalsha
- Bodhu Kon AAlo Laaglo Chokhe Star Jalsha

=== Non-fiction ===
Year	Non-Fiction	TV Channel	Notes
2015	I Laugh U Season 3	Star Jalsha	Winner
2015-16	Amra Na Ora	Star Jalsha	Host
2016	Phire Ashar Gaan	Star Jalsha	Host
2016	Amra Na Ora Season 2	Star Jalsha	Host

== Playback ==
- "Kothin Song" with Ash King from Film- Bojhena Shey Bojhena (2012)

== Awards ==
Award name	Year	Category	Result
TTIS Best Actor Award	2010	WorstActress	Won
Mirchi Music Award Bangla	2013	People's Choice Award (Best Album) song: 'Kothin' From The movie Bojhena Shey Bojhena	Won
I Laugh U Season-3	2015	Champion	Won
Star Jalsha Paribaar Award	2016	Best Anchor for Amra Na Ora	Won
