= Srabanti Chatterjee =

Indian actress and politician

- শ্রাবন্তী চট্টোপাধ্যায়
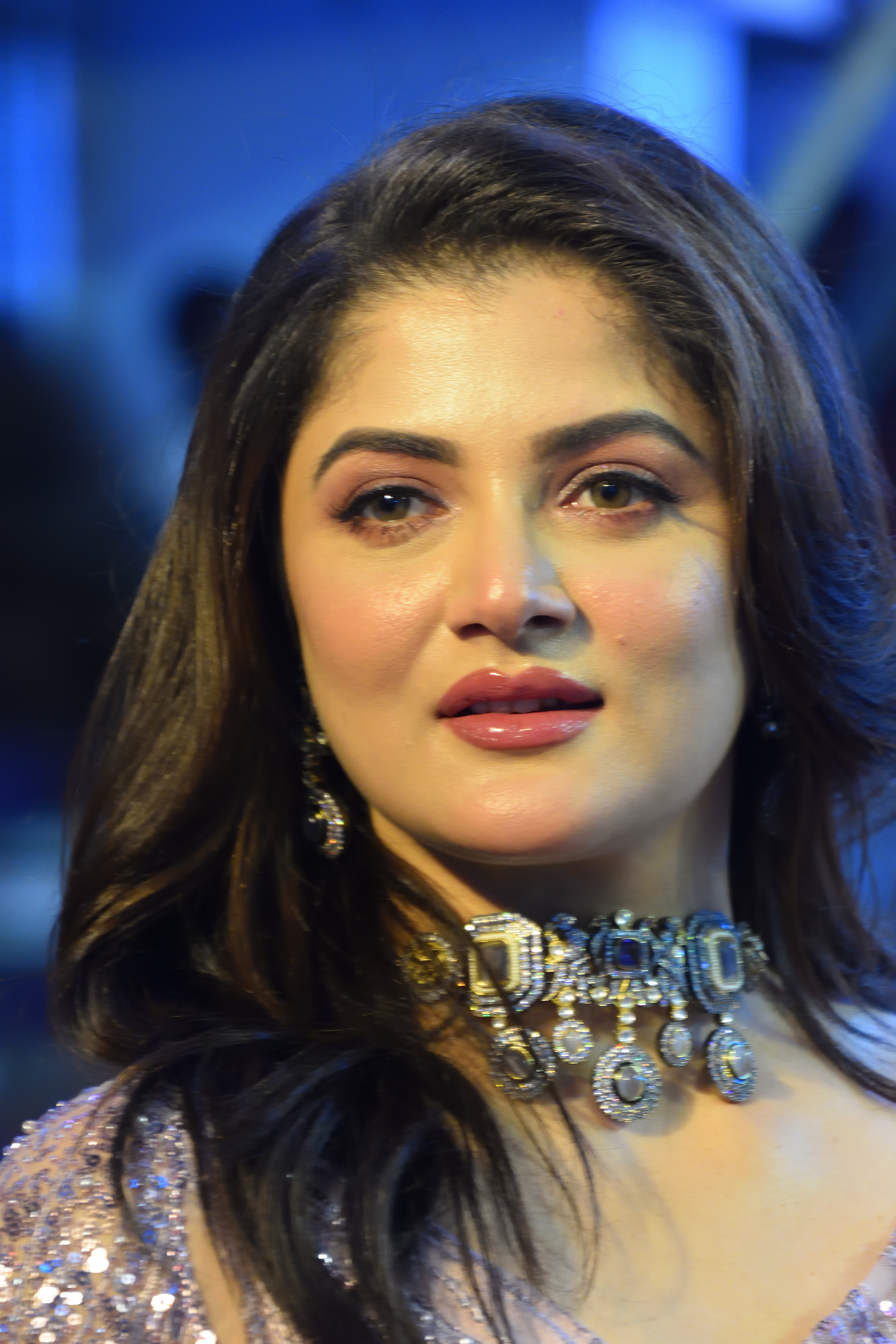
- Srabanti in 2023
- Born: 13 August 1981 (age 45); Calcutta, West Bengal, India
- Occupations: Actress; Politician
- Years active: 1997, 2003, 2008–present
- Political party: Bharatiya Janata Party (2021)
- Children: 1

Srabanti Chatterjee (born 13 August 1981) is an Indian actress and politician who works in Bengali and Hindi films. One of the highest paid and most popular actresses in Bengali cinema, she is known for her versatile acting skills and has been a popular face in the Bengali film industry. Chatterjee began her acting career as a child artist in 1997 with the film Mayar Badhon, directed by Swapan Saha. She rose to fame in 2003 after playing the lead role in Champion. Throughout her career, she has delivered several notable performances in films such as Amanush (2010), Shikari (2016) and Bhootchakra Pvt. Ltd. (2019). She is widely acclaimed for her roles in romantic and family drama films, earning her a loyal fan base across West Bengal, Bangladesh, Sri Lanka and beyond.

She has a son named Abhimanyu Chatterjee.

== Personal life ==
Chatterjee's third marriage with cabin-crew Roshan Singh ended in 2020.

In 2022 Chatterjee was issued a notice from the Wildlife Crime Control cell of West Bengal in relation to a video posted on social media featuring a mongoose pup in chains.

In 2023, fitness enthusiasts lodged a complaint against a gym she co-owned. Chatterjee denied any involvement in the issue.

== Political career ==
Chatterjee joined Bharatiya Janata Party on 1 March 2021. She was given the ticket and contested the 2021 West Bengal Legislative Assembly election from Behala Paschim against state minister of School Education and TMC heavyweight Partha Chatterjee but lost the election by 50,884 votes. Less than a year after joining, Srabanti left the Bharatiya Janata Party on 11 November 2021 citing disillusionment with the party's lack of initiative and sincerity to further the cause of the state.

== Filmography ==
†	Denotes films that have not yet been released

Year	Title	Role	Notes	Ref.
1997	Mayar Badhon	Maya	Child artist	
2003	Champion	Kabita	Lead artist	
2008	Bhalobasa Bhalobasa	Priya		
2009	Dujone	Meghna		
2010	Wanted	Puja		
2010	Amanush	Riya		
2010	Josh	Anuradha/Anu		
2010	Sedin Dekha Hoyechilo	Nandini		
2011	Fighter	Indu		
2011	Faande Poriya Boga Kaande Re	Mishti		
2012	Idiot	Anjali		
2013	Deewana	Shruti		
2013	Kanamachi	Nayana Banerjee		
2013	Goynar Baksho	Chaitali/ Young Rashmoni		
2013	Majnu	Meghna		
2014	Bindaas	Anjali		
2014	Buno Haansh	Sohag		
2015	Katmundu	Pallabi Sharma		
2015	Shudhu Tomari Jonyo	Nayanthara		
2016	Shikari	Chhutki/ Riya	Indo-Bangladesh joint venture	
2016	Sesh Sangbad	Sharmistha		
2017	Jio Pagla	Priya		
2018	Uma	Menoka		
2018	Bhaijaan Elo Re	Hiya		
2018	Piya Re	Riya		
2018	Drishyantar	Roopsha		
2018	Bagh Bandi Khela	Jayanti		
2019	Jodi Ekdin	Aritri	Bangladeshi film	
2019	Googly	Dali		
2019	Bhootchakra Pvt. Ltd.	Ranja		
2019	Teko	Mina		
2020	Uraan	Poulami		
2020	Hullor	Kuhu		
2020	Chobiyal	Labanyo		
2021	Ajob Premer Golpo	Sulagna		
2021	Lockdown	Madhubala		
2022	Kishmish		Special Appearance	
2022	Bhoy Peo Na	Ananya		
2022	Bikkhov	Afree	Bangladeshi film	
2022	Achena Uttam	Gauri Devi		
2023	Kaberi Antardhan	Kaberi Bhattacharya		
2024	Sada Ronger Prithibi	Shibani & Bhabani	Dual Role	
2025	Babu Shona	Shona		
2025	Hungama.com	Pooja		
2025	Aarii		Special Appearance	
2025	Aamar Boss	Mousumi Banerjee		
2025	Rabindra Kabya Rahasya	Hiya Sen		
2025	Devi Chowdhurani	Prafullamukhi/ Devi Chowdhurani		
2026	Dear D	TBA	Filming	
2026	O Mon Bhromon	TBA	Filming	
2026	Ami Amar Moto	TBA	Filming	
2026	Durganagar	TBA	Filming	
2026	Erao Manush	TBA	Filming	

== Television ==
Year	Title	Role	Network	Ref.
2016	Dance Bangla Dance	(Season 9) Judge	Zee Bangla	
2018	Dance Bangla Dance	(Season 10) Judge	Zee Bangla	
2018	Didi No.1	(Season 7) Contestant	Zee Bangla	
2020	Superstar Parivaar	Host	Star Jalsha	
2021	Dance Bangla Dance	(Season 11) Guest Judge	Zee Bangla	
2021	Dujone	Ahona	Hoichoi	
2023	Dance Bangla Dance	(Season 12) Judge	Zee Bangla	
2026	Thakumar Jhuli	Girijabala Sanyal	Hoichoi	

== Mahalaya ==
Year	Title	Role	Network
2011	Dasharupe Dasabhuja Mahalaya 2011	Devi Parvati, her various avatars and Devi Mahisasurmardini	Zee Bangla
2012	51 Sotipith, Mahalaya 2012	Devi Sati and Shyama Kali, Kamakhya, Joydurga, Astabhuja Singhobahini, Devi Shodashi, Bisalokkhi Monikorni	Zee Bangla
2014	Durga Durgatinashini, Mahalaya 2014	Devi Mahisasurmardini	ETV Bangla
2017	Rupang Dehi Jayang Dehi, Mahalaya 2017	Devi Parvati and Durga, Shiba, Khama, Dhatri, Swaha, Swadha	Zee Bangla
2017	Asur Dalani Durga, Mahalaya 2017	Devi Mahisasurmardini (Repetition of ETV Bangla mahalaya 2014)	Colors Bangla
2020	Asubhonashini Durga, Mahalaya 2020	Devi Mahisasurmardini (Repetition of ETV Bangla mahalaya 2014)	Colors Bangla
