= Bhalobasa Bhalobasa (2008 film) =

- Movie Poster
- Directed by: Rabi Kinagi
- Written by: Bommarillu Bhaskar
- Produced by: Ashoke Kumar Dhanuka
- Starring: Hiran Chatterjee; Srabanti Chatterjee; Sabyasachi Chakrabarty
- Edited by: Ravi Kinagi
- Music by: S. P. Venkatesh
- Distributed by: Eskay Movies
- Release date: 2 October 2008
- Running time: 155 minutes
- Country: India
- Language: Bengali
- Budget: ₹2.7 crore
- Box office: ₹6.5 crore

Bhalobasa Bhalobasa (translation: Love Love) is a 2008 Bengali film by Rabi Kinagi. The film stars Hiran Chatterjee and Srabanti Chatterjee. This film is the remake of the Telugu film Bommarillu directed and co-written by Bhaskar, starring Siddharth, Genelia D'Souza and Prakash Raj. The film primarily revolves around a father and son relationship with the father's dote on his son, leaving a bitter taste with the latter.

After five-week running success prompted producer Ashok Dhanuka added one more song "Bol Raja Chai Kemon Rani" to the film after shooting it right after Kali Puja.

== Plot ==
The film begins with a baby taking his initial steps on a beach while the father is supporting him. The narrator in the background (Prasenjit) states that, it is right for a father to support his child in his infancy, but questions whether the father should continue to hold the child's hand even after he is 24 years old. As the credits roll, a visibly angry Sidhu (Hiran) begins uttering abuses at all the fathers in the world. When inquired about his disgust, he says that his father, Aravind (Sabyasachi Chakrabarty), gives him more than what he asks for. He cites instances where his choices of dressing, hairdo and many others are stashed away by his father's. However, he vows that the two things that will be of his choice would be, his career and the woman he would marry.

Post-credits, Satya (Subhasis Mukherjee), the Arvind dutiful household's servant wakes up Sidhu in the morning. In the background, we see Siddhu's mother, Lakshmi (Laboni Sarkar) singing a devotional song while cooking. At the dining table, Arvind, Managing Director of their construction company, inquires if Siddhu will join their office for managing their business. When Sidhu deliberates, his father doesn't stand any longer and instead plans for his marriage despite Sidhu's silent protest. The next week, he returns home to realize that he is going to get engaged to Manasi against his wishes. He speaks with her only to realize that she is a "daddy's girl" and she not being to his liking. However, with Arvind's final say, they eventually get engaged.

While contemplating on his options in a temple, Sidhu accidentally meets Priya (Srabanti Malakar), an engineering student. Seeing her chirpy nature and vibrance, Sidhu begins to like her. He makes attempts to know her by meeting her on a regular basis. In the process, he starts liking her cherubic and ever-friendly nature and as someone who does what she loves. As days go by, he realizes about so many small things in her company that gave him happiness. He realizes that he has fallen in love with her.

Alongside this, Sidhu applies for a bank loan to start out on his dream of building his career. When his love for Priya deepens, he wishes to propose to her. He confesses to her that he is engaged to marry Manasi against his wishes, but what he really wants is her. On knowing of him being engaged, Priya gets dejected, but comes back a day later and asks him to do what he wishes for and accepts his proposal. At this juncture, the ecstatic Sidhu is seen by a furious Arvind. Siddhu is admonished back home and he expresses his disinterest in marriage with Manasi. When asked for his reason to like Priya, Sidhu replies saying that if Priya can stay with their family for a week, then all their questions shall be answered. He convinces Priya to stay at his house after lying to her father, Kanaka Rao (Sushanta Dutta) that she is going on a college tour.

When Priya is introduced to Sidhu's family, she gets a lukewarm welcome. As she settles down in the house, one after the other begins to like her. Even though getting used to the living habits of the authoritarian Arvind's household was difficult, Priya stayed put for Sidhu's sake. In the meanwhile, Arvind reprimands Sidhu when he knows of his bank loan and his plans, only to further enrage Sidhu. One day the entire family along with Priya attends a marriage ceremony. A cheerful Priya cheers up the ceremony with her playful nature. Coincidentally, Kanaka Rao who happens to be around, recognizes Sidhu as the drunken young man whom he encountered on an earlier occasion. Priya realizes her father's presence and quickly exits to avoid his attention. After saving their grace, Sidhu admonishes Priya for her antics at the marriage. A sad and angry Priya moves out of the house saying that she does not find Sidhu the same and that she cannot put on an act if she stays in their house. After getting back to her house, she rebuilds the trust her father has in her while Sidhu is left forlorn. Lakshmi confronts Arvind on Sidhu's choices and wants. In the process, Sidhu opens up his heart and leaving Arvind to repent on his foolishness. Sidhu requests Manasi and her parents to call off the impending marriage. While they relent, Arvind manages to convince Kanaka babu about Sidhu and Priya's marriage. In return, Kanaka wants to know more about Sidhu by having him live in house for a week. Arvind agrees with this and as the story returns to the pre-credits scene, the viewers are left to assume about the happy marriage of the protagonists.

== Cast ==
- Hiran as Sidhu
- Srabanti Chatterjee as Priya
- Sabyasachi Chakrabarty as Aravind (Sidhu's father)
- Shyamal Dutta as Kanaka Rao (Priya's father)
- Laboni Sarkar as Lakshmi (Sidhu's mother)
- Locket Chatterjee as Sidhu's sister-in-law
- Subhasish Mukherjee as Satya (servant)
- Kamalika Banerjee
- Pritam Saha as Monti (Sidhu's nephew)

== Production ==
This is the first Bengali film shot in Salzburg, Austria.

== Soundtrack ==
The music of Bhalobasa Bhalobasa is composed by S. P. Venkatesh, who reused "Appudo Ippudo" from the original as "Halka Halka Ei Ektu Melamesha". It was released in India on 22 September 2008 The soundtrack held at the number one spot on the music charts for several consecutive weeks.

Bhalobasa Bhalobasa

Studio album by S. P. Venkatesh
- Released: 22 September 2008 (CD release)
- Genre: Feature film soundtrack
- Label: Eskay Movies

S. P. Venkatesh chronology
Bondhoo (2007)	Bhalobasa Bhalobasa (2008)

Song	Singer(s)	Duration
"Bol Raja Chai Kemon Rani"	Priya, Trijoy, Niladri	4:10
"Boloto Lokey Basle Bhalo"	Shaan	5:45
"Halka Halka Ei Ektu Melamesha"	Shaan and Chorus	5:45
"Ektu Lajja Chokhe Ektu Lajja Mukhe"	Alka Yagnik, Shaan	5:41
"Gurujana Bole Prem Karona"	Priya, Amit Ral, Md.Aziz	4:10
"Bhenga Gelo Aaj Swapno Amar"	Kumar Sanu	5:10
