= Ashok Dhanuka =

Bengali film producer

- Occupation: Producer
- Children: Himanshu Dhanuka

Ashok Dhanuka is an Indian film producer. He is the founder of Eskay Movies. One of the leading film production house, studio and distribution house in West Bengal. His son Himanshu Dhanuka is also a film producer and distributor.

== Filmography ==
- Bhaijaan Elo Re (2018)
- Chalbaaz (2018)
- Nabab (2017)
- Begum Jaan (2017)
- Niyoti (2016)
- Shikari (2016)
- Romeo vs Juliet (2015)
- Khiladi (2013)
- Kanamachi (2013)
- Khokababu (2012)
- Idiot (2012)
- Shotru (2011)
- Wanted (2010) (co-producer)
- Dujone (2009)
- Bhalobasa Bhalobasa (2008)
