= Idiot (2012 film) =

2012 Bengali language action film directed by Rajiv Kumar Biswas

- Theatrical poster
- Directed by: Rajiv Kumar Biswas
- Written by: Pele Bhattacharya
- Story by: Boopathy Pandian
- Produced by: Ashok Dhanuka
- Starring: Ankush Hazra; Srabanti Chatterjee; Aditya Pancholi
- Cinematography: Murali Y Krishna
- Edited by: Md. Kalam
- Music by: Shree Pritam & Ajoy
- Production company: Eskay Movies
- Release date: 14 November 2012
- Running time: 2 hours 50 minutes
- Country: India
- Language: Bengali
- Budget: ₹2.4 crore
- Box office: ₹2 crore

Idiot is a 2012 Bengali language action masala film directed by Rajiv Kumar Biswas. Produced by Ashok Dhanuka, under the banner of Eskay Movies, it stars Ankush Hazra, Srabanti Chatterjee and Aditya Pancholi in lead roles. This film marked Aditya Pancholi's debut in Bengali cinema. It is a remake of the 2006 Tamil comedy film Thiruvilaiyaadal Aarambam.

== Plot ==
Samrat falls in love with Anjali and their love life gets on track. It is smooth sailing until the Anjali's ruthless brother gets into the picture and he does not accept Samrat. So Samrat tricks him and becomes a bigger business magnate and as a result, is accepted by everyone.

== Cast ==
- Ankush Hazra as Samrat
- Srabanti Chatterjee as Anjali, Samrat's girlfriend
- Aditya Pancholi as Anjali's elder brother Ranavijay Sinha
- Debjani Chattopadhyay as Anjali's sister-in-law
- Rajkumar Patra as Sujay Ghatak
- Pradip Dhar

== Soundtrack ==
- "Sajna Paas Aa Tu Jara" – Shaan and Mahalakshmi Iyer
- "Pagli Toke Rakhbo Boro Adore" – Zubeen Garg and Akriti Kakkar
- "Hori Din To Gelo" – Zubeen Garg
- "Havvy Lagche" – Zubeen Garg
- "Jhor Othe Mone" – Zubeen Garg and Mahalakshmi Iyer
- "Toke Hebbi Lagche" – Zubeen Garg
