= List of Indian Bengali films of 2026 =

This is a list of Indian Bengali cinema films scheduled to be released in 2026.

== January-March ==
Opening		Title	Director	Cast	Production Company	Ref.
J A N	9	Nari Choritro Bejay Jotil	Sumit- Saheel	Ankush Hazra; Oindrila Sen; Nabanita Malakar; Sohini Sengupta; Ipshita Mukherjee	Ankush Hazra Motion Pictures	
J A N	9	Kirtaner Por Kirtan	Abhimanyu Mukherjee	Gourab Chatterjee; Paran Banerjee; Arunima Ghosh; Abhijit Guha	Camellia Productions Pvt Ltd	
J A N	23	Vijaynagar'er Hirey	Chandrasis Roy	Prosenjit Chatterjee; Chiranjeet Chakraborty; Aryann Bhowmik	Shree Venkatesh Films, Nideas Creations	
J A N	23	Bhanupriya Bhooter Hotel	Aritra Mukherjee	Bonny Sengupta, Mimi Chakraborty, Swastika Dutta, Kanchan Mullick	Windows Production	
J A N	23	Hok Kolorob	Raj Chakraborty	Om Sahani; John Bhattacharya; Saswata Chatterjee	Raj Chakraborty Production House	
J A N	30	Pratyabartan – The Homecoming	Sudddhasatwya Chatterjee	Pritha Chakraborty; Sudddhasatwya Chatterjee; Swarnapali Maity Chaurasia		
F E B	6	OCD	Soukarya Ghosal	Jaya Ahsan; Kaushik Sen	Indigenous	
F E B	6	Khancha	Anirban Chakraborty	Mrinmoy Das; Rajatava Dutta; Mir Afsar Ali	Swabhumi Entertainment	
F E B	13	Mon Maaney Na	Rahool Mukherjee	Hiya Chatterjee; Soumya Mukherjee; Ritwik Bhowmik; Rukmini Maitra	Studio Boltting Paper	
F E B	13	Adamya	Ranjan Ghosh	Aryuun Ghosh; Senjuti Mukherjee	Aurora Film Corporation, Channel B Entertainment, Kinetoscope films	
F E B	27	Promoter Boudi	Sourya Deb	Swastika Mukherjee; Rajatava Dutta, Shreema Bhattacherjee	Arnab De	
F E B	27	Poyla Baishakh	Arka Dasgupta	Shantilal Mukherjee, Mumtaz Sorcar, Sneham, Suvosmita Mukherjee, Anindya Pulak Banerjee	Benzene Entertainment, Binayak Picture	
M A R	6	Phonybabu Viral	Raju Majumder	Subhasish Mukherjee; Roshni Bhattacharyya; Kanchan Mullick	Adika Productions	
M A R	19	Korpur	Arindam Sil	Saheb Chatterjee; Rituparna Sengupta; Bratya Basu; Lahoma Bhattacharjee; Kunal Ghosh	Friends Communication, Kahhak Studios	
M A R	20	Shab Khobori Bishesh Noi	Kumar Chowdhury	Prasun Gain; Deboprasad Halder	Dream Movies and Entertainment	

== April–June ==
Opening		Title	Director	Cast	Production Company	Ref.
A P R	10	Bibi Payra	Arjunn Dutta	Anirban Chakrabarti; Swastika Mukherjee; Paoli Dam	Nandy Movies	
M A Y	1	Pratyabartan	Samarpan Sengupta	Anjan Dutt; Roopa Ganguly; Silajit Majumder; Kharaj Mukherjee	Sree Abhigyan Dreamworks Pvt. Ltd.	
M A Y	15	Saptadingar Guptodhon	Dhrubo Banerjee	Abir Chatterjee; Arjun Chakrabarty; Ishaa Saha; Kaushik Ganguly	Shree Venkatesh Films	
M A Y	29	Phool Pishi O Edward	Shiboprosad Mukherjee and Nandita Roy	Sohini Sengupta; Raima Sen; Ananya Chatterjee; Koneenica Banerjee; Arjun Chakraborty	Windows Production	
M A Y	29	Phera	Pritha Chakraborty	Sanjay Mishra; Ritwick Chakraborty; Sohini Sarkar	Nandy Movies	
J U N	12	Abar Hawa Bodol	Parambrata Chatterjee	Parambrata Chatterjee; Rudranil Ghosh; Raima Sen	Eskay Movies	
J U N	19	Abhhiman	Indraadip Dasgupta	Prosenjit Chatterjee; Jisshu Sengupta; Subhashree Ganguly	Why So Serious Films	
J U N	26	Onekdin Por	Saurav Palodhi	Chitrangada Satarupa , Debesh Roy Chowdhury, Sankar Debnath, and Bimal Giri	Nideas Productions	

== July–September ==
Opening		Title	Director	Cast	Production Company	Ref.
J U L	10	Aajo Ardhangini	Kaushik Ganguly	Churni Ganguly, Jaya Ahsan, Koushik Sen, Ambarish Bhattacharya	Surinder Films	
J U L	10	Get Up Kingshuk	Nandan Ghosh	Shahir Raj, Anutorsho Mukhopadhyay, Sandipan Tapader, Dipanwita Das, Bhagyasree Roychowdhury, Arup Kar, Koushik Mandal, Rajashree Biswas, Mouparna Saha	Dipanwita Das	
J U L	10	Pinjar	Rudrajit Roy	Sagnik Mukherjee, Swastidipa Rabidas, Satakshi Nandy, Ishan Mazumder, Mallika Banerjee Roy. Joy Sengupta, Mamata Shankar	Chasing Dreams Films, Bell Jar Films	
J U L	24	Katukutu Buro	Ujaan Ganguly	Ujaan Ganguly; Rapurna Bhattacharyya; Churni Ganguly; Biswanath Basu; Bhaswar Chatterjee	Shree Venkatesh Films	
A U G	14	Keu Bole Biplobi Keu Bole Dakat	Pathikrit Basu	Jeet; Tota Roy Chowdhury; Priyanka Sarkar; Subhrajit Dutta; Kaushik Sen; srijla guha	Nandy Movies,Jeetz Filmworks Private Limited	
A U G	28	Maya Satya Bhram	Samik Roy Choudhury	Soham Majumdar; Priyanka Sarkar; Paran Bandopadhyay	Pinrin Film Production	
S E P	4	Winkle Twinkle	Srijit Mukherji	Ritwick Chakraborty, Angana Roy	Friends Communication	
S E P	11	Ghun Gao	Soumya Roy Chowdhury	Ranojoy Bishnu; Anindita Bose; Sankar Debnath; Rohini Chatterjee; Sritama Dey	Cine krazy Entertainment	
S E P	18	Daktar Kaku	Pavel	Prosenjit Chatterjee; Ena Saha	Metro ton Production	
S E P	18	Beporoya	Abhirup Ghosh	Adrit Roy, Aryaa Roy	Shree Venkatesh Films	
S E P	26	Autobi	Soumava Banerjee	Madhumita Sarcar; Saheb Chatterjee; Inaaya Choudhury; Aryann Bhowmik	Siddhi Vinayak Film Production	

== October–December ==
Opening		Title	Director	Cast	Production Company	Ref.
O C T	15	Bohurupi: The Golden Daku	Shiboprosad Mukherjee; Nandita Roy	Jisshu Sengupta, Shiboprosad Mukherjee, Sohini Sarkar, Koushani Mukherjee	Windows Production	
O C T	15	The Eken: Kerala-e Kurukshetra	Joydeep Mukherjee	Anirban Chakrabarti, Raima Sen, Ritwick Chakraborty, Kamaleswar Mukherjee	Hoichoi Studios	
O C T	15	Emperor vs Sarat Chandra	Srijit Mukherji	Abir Chatterjee, Tota Roy Chowdhury, Mimi Chakraborty, Divyani Mondal, Richard Bhakti Klein,Kanchan Mullick, Koushani Mukherjee	Nandy Movies	
O C T	16	DeSu7	Dev	Dev, Subhashree Ganguly, Anirban Bhattacharya	Dev Entertainment Ventures, SSR Cinemas (Associated)	
N O V	13	Mrigaya 1.5	Abhirup Ghosh	Ritwick Chakraborty, Koushani Mukherjee, Arpan Ghoshal, Mir Afsar Ali	Tenth Dimension Entertainment	
N O V	20	Sadhak Bamakhyapa	Sayantan Ghosal	Sabyasachi Chowdhury; Payel De; Saheb Chatterjee	Shree Venkatesh Films	
N O V	27	Shey Toh Aajo Bojhena	Ron Raj	Soham Chakraborty, Priyanka Sarkar, Bibriti Chatterjee	Pandey Motion Pictures	
N O V	27	Nazarbandi	Debarati Bhowmick	Rituparna Sengupta, Paayel Sarkar, Darshana Banik , Rajnandini Paul	KathaVinyaas Media LLP , Armaan Ventures	
D E C	4	Ei Shohorer gaan	Prajun Majumdar	Parambrata Chatterjee,Anirban Chakrabarti, Koneenica Banerjee	Staged Films	
D E C	4	Baba	Jiit Chakraborty	Vikram Chatterjee,Aparajita Adhya, Kiran Majumdar, Debraj Bhattacharya	SSR Cinemas Pvt Limited	
D E C	11	Dear D	Rabindra Nambiar	Srabanti Chatterjee, Ditipriya Roy	Eskay Movies	
D E C	13	Bishwnno	Mainak Bhaumik	Lokenath Dey, Paayel Sarkar	Nandy Movies	
D E C	24	Bike Ambulance Dada	Vinay M Mudgil	Dev, Parthasarathi Chakraborty, Rukmini Maitra, Priyanka Sarkar	Nandy Movies, Dev Entertainment Ventures	

== See Also ==
List of Indian Bengali films of 2027
