= Rainbow Jelly =

2018 film by Soukarya Ghosal

- Movie poster
- Bengali: রেনবো জেলি
- Directed by: Soukarya Ghosal
- Screenplay by: Soukarya Ghosal
- Story by: Soukarya Ghosal
- Produced by: Soukarya Ghosal
- Starring: Sreelekha Mitra; Kaushik Sen; Shantilal Mukherjee; Mahabrata Basu; Anumegha Banerjee
- Cinematography: Aalok Maity
- Edited by: Arghyakamal Mitra
- Music by: Nabarun Bose
- Production company: Indigenous
- Distributed by: Shree Venkatesh Films
- Release date: 25 June 2018 (Kolkata)
- Running time: 121 minute
- Country: India
- Language: Bengali

Rainbow Jelly (Bengali: রেনবো জেলি) is a 2018 Indian Bengali-language children's science-fantasy film written and directed by Soukarya Ghosal and starring Sreelekha Mitra, Kaushik Sen, Shantilal Mukherjee and introducing Mahabrata Basu and Anumegha Banerjee. The story revolves around a young boy with marginal IQ whose life changes dramatically when he begins to experience the different expressions of food that fill the taste buds and have varied reactions on people who savour them.

Rainbow Jelly is the first-ever attempt in Food Fantasy Film genres, perhaps India’s first, made in Bengali language. The story of the film is an outcome of Ghosal's two years of research on Taste Theory & Ayurveda. The film won the Best Feature Film for Soukarya Ghosal at Hiralal Sen Award in 2019 from FFSI.

== Plot ==
The film based on a 12 years old orphan special child 'Ghoton', who is a magical cook. He is not sent to school and is captivated in his own dilapidated ancestral house by his only guardian 'Gondaria', his maternal uncle. Gondaria is a foodie & selfish character man who treats Ghoton like his servant. He always blackmails the boy saying that Ghoton's father who was an acclaimed scientist had left a treasure for his son. Only if Ghoton serves Gondaria till he turns 18 years, he can have the treasure. The innocent boy believes his uncle till a mysterious woman 'Poripishi'(aunt fairy) comes to him & claims, that she only can turn his dream of treasure true. That too within 7 days. For which she would secretly cook seven different dishes of food on behalf of Ghoton, of 7 different tastes ie, Sweet, Sour, Salty, Spicy, Pungent, Astringent & Bitter for the coming 7 days. With every taste & colour of the food Gondaria's mood changes accordingly. Sweet-Red dish makes him lovable. Sour-Orangy makes him repent. Salty-Yellow makes him contemplative. Spicy-Green makes him sad. Blue-Pungent makes him tense. Indigo-Astringent makes him hasty and the Bitter-Violet makes him angry. Finally, on the 8th day, Poripishi prepares a special dish with the residues of the prior seven dishes. This is a magical food - Rainbow Jelly which consists of all the tastes & colours of the universe. If anyone has it the person changes completely into a new human being. Ghoton serves that to Gondaria. After this a magical change occurs in Ghoton's life with which he not only discovers the hidden treasure of his father but also comes across the actual truth of his life. The truth that no one knew. The truth never could have been revealed if Rainbow Jelly wouldn't come into his life.

== Cast ==
Actor	Role
Mahabrata Basu	Ghoton
Anumegha Banerjee	Poppins
Sreelekha Mitra	Pori Pishi
Kaushik Sen	Gondaria
Shantilal Mukherjee	Anadi
Daminee Basu	Poppin’s Mother
Subhajit Das	Poppin’s Father
Suvankar Mitra	Chyalakatth
Sumedha Dey	Anita
Subrata Roy	Doctor
Iqbal Sultan	Kabuli

== Soundtrack ==
Rainbow Jelly

Soundtrack album by Soukarya Ghosal, Nabarun Bose, Megh Banerjee
- Released: 2018
- Genre: Feature film soundtrack
- Length: 22:34
- Language: Bengali
- Label: Zee Music Company

The Music of the film is composed by Soukarya Ghosal, Nabarun Bose and Megh Banerjee. The sound design and mixing are done by Anindit Roy and Adeep Singh Manki. Out of six original songs, Soukarya Ghosal composed the title track music, Megh Banerjee composed music for Kosto Tumi. Nabarun Bose composed music for the rest of 4 songs. The soundtrack was released by Zee Music Company. The full music album was released in 2018.

All lyrics have been penned by Soukarya Ghosal.

No.	Title	Writer(s)	Singer(s)	Length
1.	"Rainbow Jelly (Title Track)"	Soukarya Ghosal	Nabarun Bose	3:34
2.	"Poripishi"	Soukarya Ghosal	Shinjini, Tapamita, Palashpriya	3:26
3.	"Roopkotha"	Soukarya Ghosal	Sahana Bajpaie	3:01
4.	"Koshto Tumi"	Soukarya Ghosal	Totini Mukherjee	3:54
5.	"Ei Chhele"	Soukarya Ghosal	Moushumi Bhowmik	3:59
6.	"Tumi Too Achhoi"	Soukarya Ghosal	Prashmita Paul	4:40
Total length:				22:34

== Reception ==
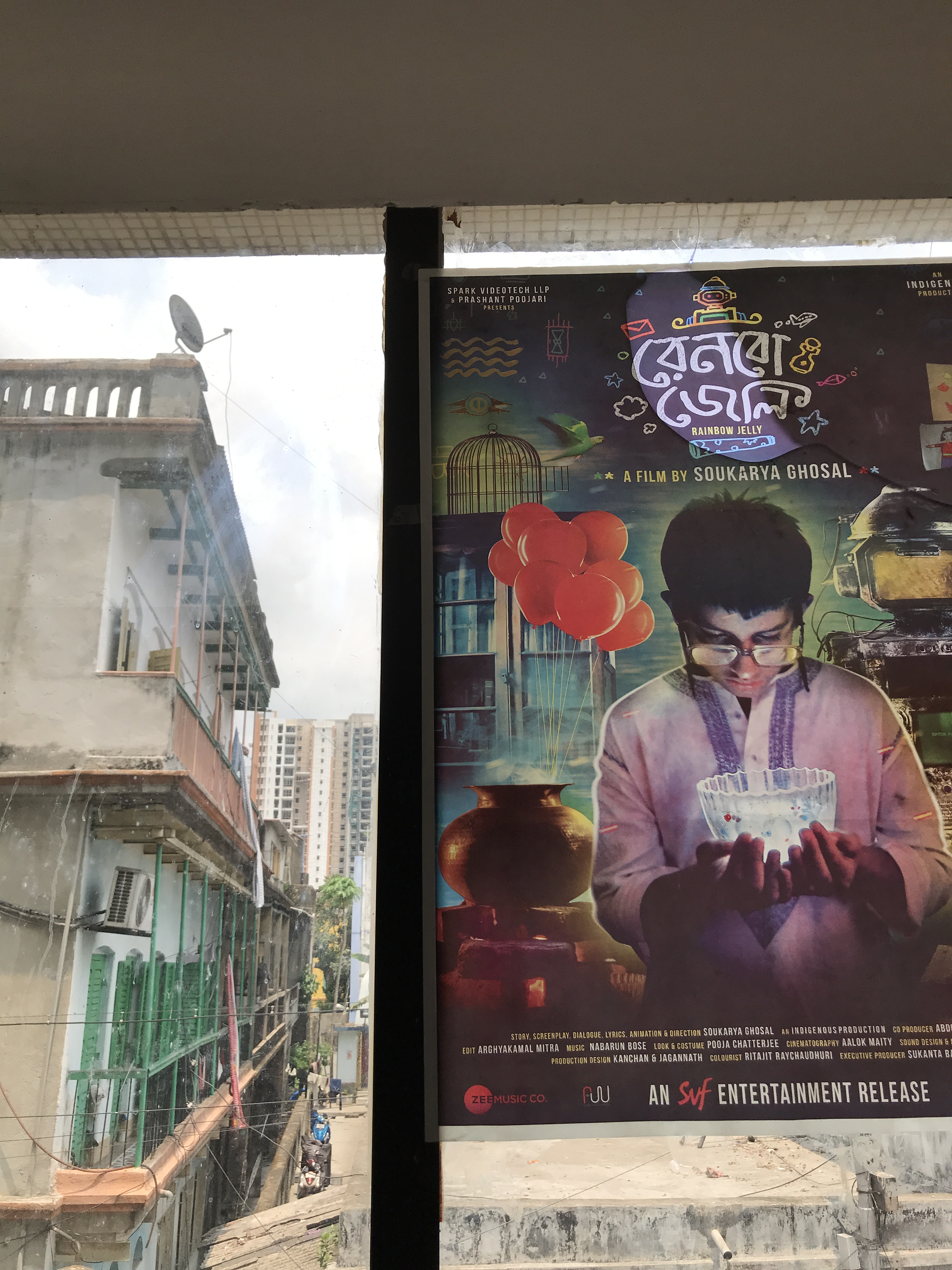
Rainbow Jelly at Star Theatre

The film was released on 25 June 2018 in India and received positive critical reviews. The Times of India gives 3.5 Critic's rating out of 5. 'Rainbow Jelly got 27 shows in the opening week' at Nandan, film and cultural centre in Kolkata, India. The film screened at the Hyderabad Bengali Film Festival at Prasad Labs on 23 June 2018 and bagged 5 awards.

The Bahrain Authority for Culture and Antiquities (formerly known as the Ministry of Culture and Information, Bahrain) headed by Shaikha Mai bint Mohammed Al-Khalifa, presented the film Rainbow Jelly on 7 July 2018 and the film was also screened at Nakhool Tent Cinema Hall- Arad Fort, Bahrain on 3 August 2018.

The film has been screened at prestigious film festivals in India, including 13th Habitat International Film Festival on 27 May 2018, Amaltas Hall at India Habitat Centre, New Delhi India. The film also screened at the first Pondicherry International Film Festival, Bengaluru Bengali Film Festival, 8th Kolkata Children Film Festival, Bay Area South Asian Film Festival (BASAFF), and at the Smile International Film Festival for Children & Youth at New Delhi, India.

The film was nominated in the Best Film (Bengali) category for the first-ever Critics Choice Film Awards, India, an initiative of the All India Film Critics Guild and All India Motion Content Group, the awards aim to recognise and honour the best of Indian Cinema.

== Sequel ==
A spiritual sequel titled Pokkhirajer Dim, directed by Soukarya Ghosal, was released theatrically on 13 June 2025. It reunites the characters Ghoton and Poppins portrayed by Mahabrata Basu and Anumegha Banerjee—and features Anirban Bhattacharya in a lead role.

== Awards and nominations ==
Award	Category	Nominee	Result	Year
Hyderabad Bengali Film Festival	Best Film (Jury Awards)	Rainbow Jelly	Won	2018
Hyderabad Bengali Film Festival	Best Screenplay (Jury Award)	Soukarya Ghosal	Won	2018
Hyderabad Bengali Film Festival	Best Editing (Jury Award)	Arghyakamal Mitra	Won	2018
Hyderabad Bengali Film Festival	Best Film (Viewers' Choice Award)	Rainbow Jelly	Won	2018
Hyderabad Bengali Film Festival	Best Actor, Male (Viewers' Choice Award)	Mahabrata Basu	Won	2018
Hiralal Sen Award	Best Bengali film of the year	Rainbow Jelly	Won	2019
WBFJA Awards	Most Promising Director	Soukarya Ghosal	Won	2019
WBFJA Awards	Best Film	Soukarya Ghosal	Nominated	2019
Critics Choice Film Awards	Best Film (Bengali)	Rainbow Jelly	Nominated	2019
