= Pokkhirajer Dim =

2025 Indian Bengali-language science fantasy film

- Theatrical release poster
- Directed by: Soukarya Ghosal
- Screenplay by: Soukarya Ghosal
- Story by: Soukarya Ghosal
- Produced by: Jyoti Deshpande; Shrikant Mohta; Mahendra Soni
- Starring: Anirban Bhattacharya; Mahabrata Basu; Anumegha Banerjee; Alexx O'Nell
- Cinematography: Soumik Haldar
- Edited by: Sanglap Bhowmik
- Music by: Nabarun Bose
- Production companies: Jio Studios; SVF Entertainment
- Distributed by: SVF Entertainment
- Release date: 13 June 2025
- Country: India
- Language: Bengali

Pokkhirajer Dim lit. 'Egg of the Pakshiraj' is a 2025 Indian Bengali-language science-fantasy comedy film directed by Soukarya Ghosal and produced by Jio Studios and SVF Entertainment. The film stars Anirban Bhattacharya as Batabyal, alongside Mahabrata Basu and Anumegha Banerjee reprising their roles. Set in the fictional village of Akashgunj, the narrative blends Bengali folklore with science fiction elements.

The story centers on a supernatural relic that can read minds. Principal photography took place in Shimultala, Bankura, West Bengal, from September 2023 to late November 2023. The film was theatrically released on 13 June 2025. It was selected at the 56th International Film Festival of India in Goa in 2025.

== Plot ==
After the events of Rainbow Jelly, Ghoton struggled in math at Akashgunj High School in rural Bengal. He sought coaching from Batabyal, who initially refused due to Ghoton's poor grades. Ghoton convinced Batabyal by producing Pokkhirajer Dim, a mythical stone said to read minds, which he claimed came from outer space. Batabyal, a scientist, saw the stone's potential and agreed to study it.

Poppins, Ghoton's childhood friend from Kolkata, joined their experiments. As they tested the relic, they drew attention in Akashgunj. Dr. Alistair Reed, a British archaeologist, wanted the stone. Reed, journalist Mr. Mitra, and village chief Samantababu tried to take it from them. An alien spaceship arrived, claiming the stone belonged to their world. Ghoton returned the stone to the aliens.

== Cast ==
- Anirban Bhattacharya as Batabyal
- Mahabrata Basu as Ghoton
- Anumegha Banerjee as Poppins
- Alexx O'Nell as Dr. Alistair Reed
- Shyamal Chakraborty as Batabyal's assistant
- Subrata Sengupta as Head Sir Gunadhar Bagchi
- Debesh Roy Chowdhury
- Kaushik Chattopadhyay as Batabyal's deceased father
- Shubhashish Gangopadhyay and Anujoy Chattopadhyay as members of Blind Opera Theatre (cameo)

== Soundtrack ==
Pokkhirajer Dim

Soundtrack album by Soukarya Ghosal, Nabarun Bose
- Released: 2025
- Genre: Feature film soundtrack
- Length: 21:38
- Language: Bengali
- Label: SVF Music

The music of Pokkhirajer Dim is composed by Nabarun Bose and Soukarya Ghosal, with all lyrics by Soukarya Ghosal.

Ghosal composed both versions of "Ki Hobe Taar", while Bose composed the remaining songs. The soundtrack was released by SVF Music in 2025.

No.	Title	Singer(s)	Length
1.	"Pokkhirajer Dim Title Track"	Anirban Bhattacharya	3:38
2.	"Ki Hobe Taar"	Lagnajita Chakraborty	5:02
3.	"Shurjer Shaat Rong"	Rupankar Bagchi	4:28
4.	"Ki Hobe Taar (Male)"	Ujan Chatterjee	4:48
5.	"Pokkhirajer Dim Title Track (Batabyal Version)"	Anirban Bhattacharya	3:42
Total length:			21:38

== Production ==
=== Development ===
Director Soukarya Ghosal described the film as "a whimsical ode to Bengali fantasy traditions" that pays tribute to Satyajit Ray's scientific curiosity. In an interview with Anandabazar Patrika, Ghosal said the script required research into physics and Bengali folklore. In an interview with The New Indian Express, Ghosal elaborated on the challenges of visualizing quantum phenomena for a mass audience. The project was announced on 8 September 2023, with a poster released on 16 May 2025.

=== Filming ===
Principal photography began on 9 September 2023 after a muhurat ceremony at SVF's Kolkata office. Key locations included Shimultala and villages in Bankura to depict Akashgunj, with additional sequences shot in Kolkata. Ghosal faced budget constraints in set design and VFX, and he and his team worked three months on pre-production. The shoot was split into two schedules, with an outdoor schedule at Simultala in September and a second schedule in November.

== Release ==
Pokkhirajer Dim was released theatrically on 13 June 2025. The marketing campaign emphasized the tagline "Equations Can Change Reality". A special screening attended by Parambrata Chattopadhyay, Jaya Ahsan, and Srijit Mukherji was held on 11 June 2025.

== Reception ==
Pokkhirajer Dim received positive reviews from critics, who praised its blend of Bengali folklore and science fiction, the performances of the cast, and its visual appeal, while some noted issues with pacing and the climax.

Arkapravo Das of The Times of India rated the film 3.5 out of 5 stars, praising its cinematography and Anirban Bhattacharya's performance. He called the film's "breathtaking Chhota Nagpur plateau landscape" captured through its cinematography "one of the high points of the film." He also commended Anirban Bhattacharya's performance, noting his "flair for comedy" and his portrayal of Batabyal as "that favourite teacher you'd idolise in school," and wrote that the film "isn't just a 'children's film', it is a film for all ages, to be enjoyed by everyone." Shomini Sen of Anandabazar Patrika described it as "a love letter to Bengali fantasy traditions" and highlighted Bhattacharya's comedic genius and emotional depth.

Agnivo Niyogi of The Telegraph described the film as a "spiritual successor" to Rainbow Jelly, noting its blend of Bengali children's literature and science fiction. He noted that "the pacing in the first half wobbles" and that "the subplot involving a budding romance between Ghoton and Poppins feels more awkward than endearing," and that "even the climax feels rushed with all loose ends tied too conveniently." However, he concluded that the film still casts a gentle spell.

Reviews in News18 Bangla praised the film's blend of science fiction and rural Bengali flavour. Arpita Raychowdhury rated it 4.5 out of 5 stars and wrote that it contains "the flavour of Thakurmar Jhuli by Leela Majumdar and Dakshinaranjan Mitra Majumdar, and the scientific theories of Professor Shonku." Pooja Basu Dutta rated it 4 out of 5 stars and similarly noted that the film has "the flavour of Thakurmar Jhuli... and the scientific theories of Professor Shonku," adding that director Soukarya Ghosal created "a simple science fiction film in the heart of Bengal" that "will be loved by children." Both reviews concluded that the film is "not just a children's film, it is a film for everyone, a film that makes you feel good."

Actor Rajatava Dutta, writing for T2Online, praised the film's ability to "transport us back to the simplicity and wonder of childhood" and noted that it "not only delivers this magical enchantment but also grounds the sci-fi fantasy in a logical framework." He commended the lead performances, writing that Mahabrata Basu as Ghoton and Anumegha Banerjee as Poppins "deliver such natural and captivating performances that it's hard to look away," and that Anirban Bhattacharya "once again showcases his unique talent, portraying a character unlike anything he had done before." He also praised Soumik Haldar's cinematography and Nabarun Bose's background score, the latter for "masterfully capturing every mood." His main criticism was that "if the antagonist team could have had a better punishment, then the story would have been more exciting."

== See also ==
- List of Indian films of 2025
