= Shaktirupenn =

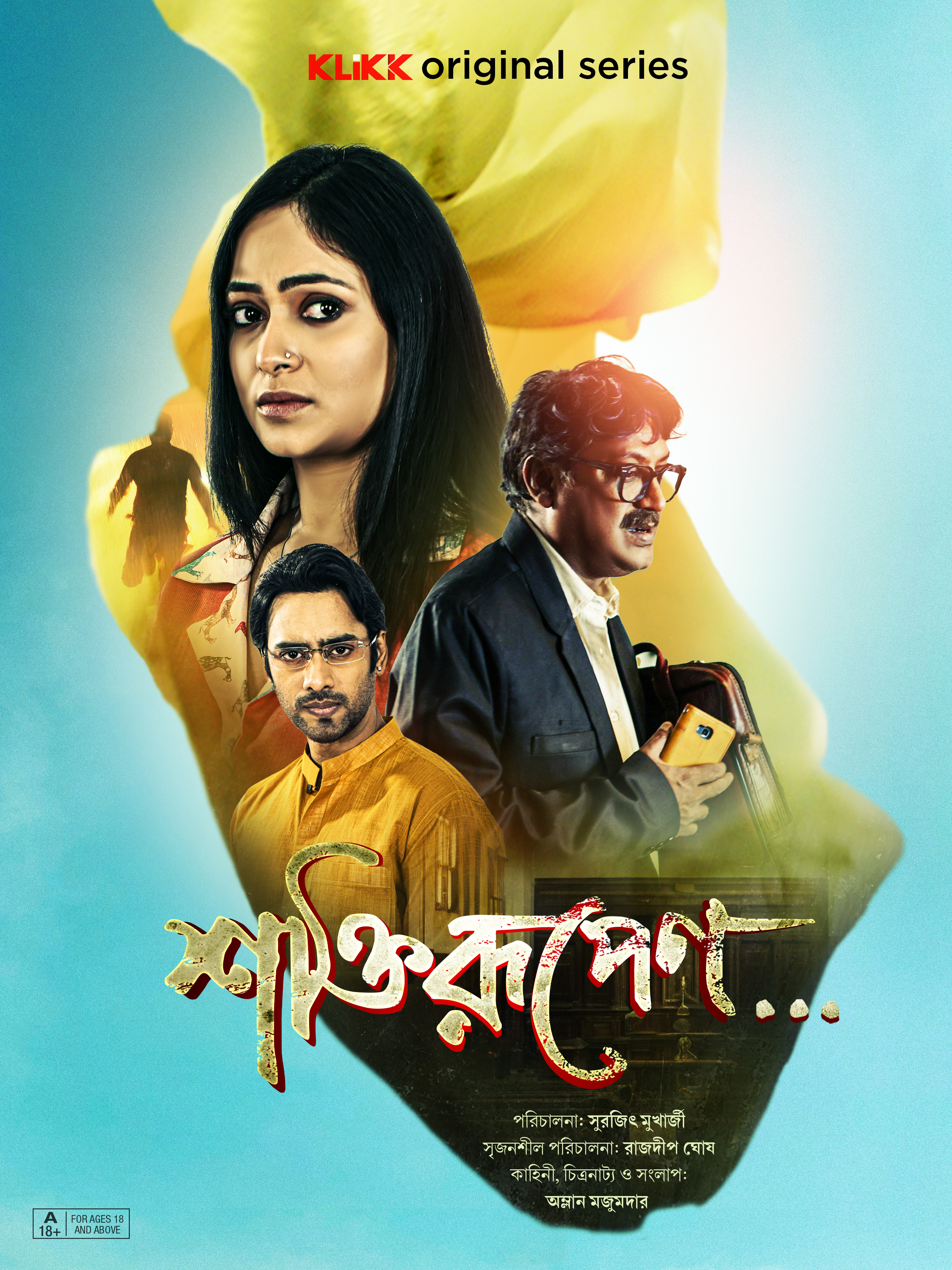
- Genre: crime and thriller
- Written by: Amlan Majumder
- Directed by: Rajdeep Ghosh and Surajit Mukherjee
- Starring: Basabdatta Chatterjee, Rezwan Rabbani Sheikh, Amlan Majumder, Buddhadeb Bhattacharya, Rana Mukherjee
- Country of origin: India
- Original language: Bengali
- No. of seasons: 1
- No. of episodes: 6

Production
- Cinematography: Saurav Banerjee
- Editors: Anjaan and Koustav Sarkar
- Production company: Skypan Communication

Original release
- Release: 13 March 2024

Shaktirupenn is a 2024 Bengali language thriller and crime web series directed by Rajdeep Ghosh and Surajit Mukherjee. The series is written and produced by Amlan Majumder.

The series starring Basabdatta Chatterjee, Rezwan Rabbani Sheikh, Amlan Majumder, Buddhadeb Bhattacharya and Rana Mukherjee are in the lead roles.

The series was released on 13 March 2024.

== Cast ==
- Basabdatta Chatterjee
- Rezwan Rabbani Sheikh
- Amlan Majumder
- Buddhadeb Bhattacharya
- Rana Mukherjee
- Soumen Dutt
- Ankur Roy
- Pallavi Roy

== Plot ==
The inhabitants of the infamous town of Sutia are plagued with a legacy of sexual violence and homicide. A catastrophic incident observed by Damayanti and Shirsha in 2001 initiates a sequence of events. A modern activist, Damayanti, uncovers a case of gang rape but faces opposition. She seeks recourse from the court as her life disintegrates, only to be deceived. As the narrative unfolds, mysterious murders occur, revealing a connection to Sutia's brutality. Damayanti's perseverance confronts the enigmatic shadows of history and unveils the truth behind the offenses.

== Episodes ==
No.	Title	Directed by	Original release date
1	"Paap"	Rajdeep Ghosh and Surajit Mukherjee	13 March 2024
On a stormy rainy night on their walk home, Rishan and Damayanti come upon a terrible occurrence.
2	"Pratibad"	Rajdeep Ghosh and Surajit Mukherjee	13 March 2024
Damayanti is unable to comprehend Naina's demise. She vocalizes her dissent
3	"Sanghat"	Rajdeep Ghosh and Surajit Mukherjee	13 March 2024
The confrontation commenced, with Advocate Halder representing Naina in court. Damayanti served as the eyewitness in the case.
4	"Bisarjan"	Rajdeep Ghosh and Surajit Mukherjee	13 March 2024
Damayanti loses the legal battle. She currently possesses a new residence.
5	"Punarjanmo"	Rajdeep Ghosh and Surajit Mukherjee	13 March 2024
The defendants were exonerated. Conversely, Damayanti is experiencing mental instability today. Meanwhile, a new adversary has emerged.
6	"Sanghar"	Rajdeep Ghosh and Surajit Mukherjee	13 March 2024
Each of the accused was eliminated individually. Another somebody is operating behind the scenes.
