= Tokhon Kuasa Chilo =

2019 Bengali film

- Directed by: Saibal Mitra
- Produced by: Pradip Churiwal
- Starring: Soumitra Chatterjee; Saswata Chatterjee; Basabdatta Chatterjee
- Edited by: Sumit Ghosh
- Music by: Tejendra Narayan Majumder
- Release dates: July 2019 (Hyderabad); 5 November 2021 (West Bengal)
- Running time: 133 Minutes
- Country: India
- Language: Bengali

Tokhon Kuasa Chilo is a 2019 Bengali thriller drama film directed by Saibal Mitra and produced by Pradip Churiwal. The movie is based on the novel of the same name by Syed Mustafa Siraj published in 1985. The film premiered at the 2019 Hyderabad Bengali Film Festival.

== Plot ==
The film revolves around the life of a retired teacher Akhilbabu and his struggles as he goes against social injustice to ensure the safety of his family. He has two students, Sachin and Putu. Shachin is involved with political mafias and grows to become a goon who threats Akhilbabu with the intention to marry his granddaughter. At this juncture the teacher seeks help from another student, Putu, to save them from the goons.

== Cast ==
- Soumitra Chatterjee as Akhilbabu
- Saswata Chatterjee
- Basabdatta Chatterjee
- Ankita Majumder
