= Nabarun Bose =

Nabarun Bose নবারুণ বোস
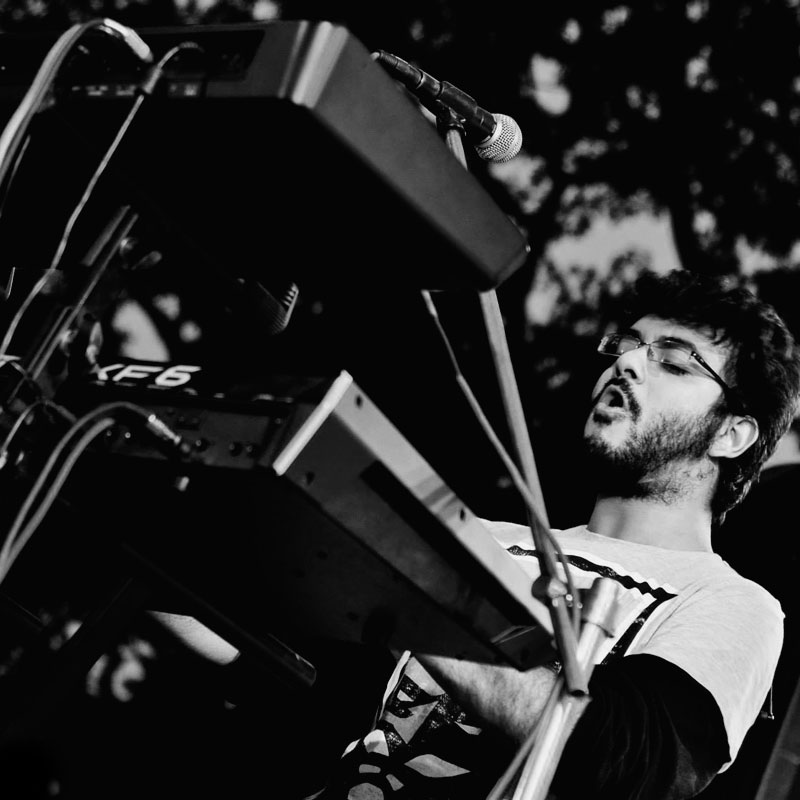
- Nabarun Bose

Background information
- Also known as: Nobby
- Born: Nabarun Bose; 30 December 1988 (age 37); Kolkata, West Bengal, India
- Genres: Pop, Rock, Rap
- Occupations: Composer; Keyboard player; Music producer
- Instruments: Keyboard, Piano, Melodica

Nabarun Bose (Bengali: নবারুণ বোস; born 30 December 1988) is an Indian keyboard player, composer and music producer from Kolkata, West Bengal. He made his debut as a music director in 2018 with the feature film Rainbow Jelly. Previously, he had directed music for the television film Loadshedding in 2015, and had scored the background music for many films and webseries including the short film Ahalya, Sharate Aaj, Kaali season 1 & season 2, Feluda, Bhalobashar Shohor, Mafia and many others. He has been acclaimed for his work as a music director in the films Tangra Blues and Mukhosh (2021). As a music producer, his career spans over nine years. He is known for arranging and programming music for Anupam Roy in films like Piku, Chotushkone, Highway, Pink and many others.

He is also an intrinsic part of The Anupam Roy Band, where he plays keyboards. He is also the keyboard player for the experimental bleak-rock band Enolaton and he also works as a vocalist and songwriter for the rap-metal band The Prophesor. As a keyboard player and music producer he has worked with many other bands and artists including Fossils, Ganesh Talkies, Neel and the Ligtbulbs, Zoo and many others. He was awarded Song Producer of the Year at the Mirchi Music Awards Bangla 2018 and the best music director award at WBFJA 2021.

== Early life ==
Bose's mother is an Indian classical vocalist. Nabarun completed his schooling at Patha Bhavan. When he was 17, he became interested in becoming a musician. During college, he was playing for various bands and did studio sessions for music directors. He earned an undergraduate and a postgraduate degree in English literature from Presidency College, Kolkata. After graduating, he taught for a year at Kishore Bharati Bhagini Nivedita College as a part-time professor before quitting the job to pursue music full time.

== Music ==
Bose's first professional band was a Hindi pop-rock band called ‘The Colors’ who released their first album ‘Naya Din’ from ‘Purple Music’ in 2010. In 2011, he met Anupam Roy and became one of the founding members of The Anupam Roy Band. In 2013, Bose began producing and arranging music.

In 2015, he made his playback debut with Office Song from the movie Katmundu. In the same year he debuted as music director for the Bengali movie Loadshedding. He composed background scores for the movie Jomer Raja Dilo Bor and Dwitiyo Ripu and has been recognized for his background score of Ahalya, a short film directed by Sujoy Ghosh.

Nabarun also fronts a Bengali alternative-metal band called The Prophesor where he works as a vocalist and songwriter. As of September 2020, The Prophesor has released their first EP - "Year One" on various digital platforms. He is also the keyboard player for the alternative-rock project Enolaton.

== Discography ==
=== with The Anupam Roy Band ===
Year	Title	Language	Role
2013	Dwitiyo Purush	Bengali	Keyboard Player, Backing Vocals
2014	Bakyobageesh	Bengali	Keyboard Player, Backing Vocals
2017	Ebar Morle Gachh Hawbo	Bengali	Keyboard Player, Backing Vocals

=== with other bands ===
Year	Band/ Artist	Album	Song(s)	Role
2010	The Colors	Naya Din	All songs	Keyboard Player, composer
2012	Calcutta Blues	Rajkanya	Bondhu, Kolkata, Modhyoraate	Keyboard Player
2012	Ganesh Talkies	3 Tier-Non AC EP	All songs	Keyboard Player, composer
2012	Neel and the Lightbulbs	House in a Car EP	915	Keyboard Player
2013	Zoo	The Attic Sessions EP	Pulp	Organ Player
2013	Fossils	Fossils 4	Khnoro amar fossil, Mohakash, Shoytaan	Keyboard Player
2014	Ganesh Talkies	In Technicolor	All songs	Keyboard Player
2017	Sanchita Roy	Kagojer Nouka	Bhir Ghire Ase	Keyboard Player and Programming

== Filmography ==
=== As a music producer ===
Year	Film	Music director	Song(s)	Role
2012	One Liner (Unreleased)	Anupam Roy	All songs (except one)	Music Arranger/Programmer
2012	Bedroom	Rupam Islam and Alan Ao	Mayabono Biharini and Dnaare Dnaare Droom	Keyboard Player
2012	Teen Yaari Katha	Anupam Roy	Teen Yaari Kotha Title song	Music Arranger/Programmer
2013	Shunyo Awnko	Anupam Roy	Ki Bibhotsho Moja	Music Arranger/Programmer
2013	Mishawr Rawhoshyo	Indraadip Dasgupta	Kakababu’r gaan (reprise)	Keyboard Player
2014	Chaya Manush	Anupam Roy	All songs	Music Arranger/Programmer
2014	Window Connection	Anupam Roy	All songs	Music Arranger/Programmer
2014	Highway	Anupam Roy	All songs (except Pratidin)	Music Arranger/Programmer
2014	Chotushkone	Anupam Roy	All songs	Music Arranger/Programmer
2015	Bela Seshe	Anupam Roy	Shesh Belaye and Obhabe Keno	Music Arranger/Programmer
2015	Piku	Anupam Roy	All songs (except Lamhe Guzar Gaye)	Music Arranger/Programmer
2015	Family Album	Anupam Roy	All songs	Music Arranger/Programmer
2015	Jomer Raja Dilo Bor	Anupam Roy	All songs and Background Score	Music Arranger for the songs and background music director
2015	Dwitiyo Ripu	Gaurab Chatterjee, Rishabh Ray, Nabarun Bose	All songs and Background Score	Music Arranger, Keyboard Player, Co-music director
2015	Katmundu	Anupam Roy	Office Song and Sidhu-Sunny-Pablo	Music arranger, Vocalist
2016	Praktan	Anupam Roy	Kolkata and Tumi Jake Bhalobasho(Female version)	Music Arranger/Programmer
2016	Shaheb Bibi Golaam	Anupam Roy	All songs (except Tomar Shawhore)	Music Arranger/Programmer
2016	Pink	Anupam Roy	Tujhse Hi Hain Roshni	Music Arranger/Programmer
2016	Zulfiqar	Anupam Roy	Ami ajkal bhalo achhi and Ghawrbari	Music Arranger/Programmer
2017	Black Coffee	Anupam Roy	All Songs	Music Arranger/Programmer
2017	RunningShaadi.com	Anupam Roy	Main Farar Sa	Music Arranger/Programmer
2017	Dear Maya	Anupam Roy	Kehne Ko, Sune Saaye and Saat Rangon Se (Acoustic)	Music Arranger/Programmer
2017	Chaamp	Anupam Roy	Tumio Chaamp	Music Arranger/Programmer
2017	Projapoti Biskut	Anupam Roy	Ahare Mon	Music Arranger/Programmer
2017	Chalochchitro Circus	Anupam Roy		Music Arranger/Programmer
2017	Chol Kuntal	Anupam Roy	Chol Kuntal Title Track	Music Arranger/Programmer
2019	Buro Sadhu	Pranjal Das	Askhara, Noyono Tomaare, Buro Sadhu Title Track	Music Arranger
2019	Buro Sadhu	Pranjal Das	Jole Jhapash Na	Keyboard Player
2022	The Eken	Subhadeep Guha	BGM	Programmer and Keyboard Player
2023	The Eken	Subhadeep Guha	BGM	Programmer and Keyboard Player
2023	Abar Bibaho Obhijaan	Subhadeep Guha	BGM	Programmer and Keyboard Player
2023	Ardhangini	Anupam Roy	Shorir Bhalo nei	Arranger/Programmer

=== As a music director ===
Year	Film	Director	Role
2015	Ahalya (Short Film)	Sujoy Ghosh	Background Music
2015	Jomer Raja Dilo Bor	Abir Sengupta	Background Music
2015	Loadshedding	Soukarya Ghosal	Music Director
2017	Dance of Joy (Documentary)	Aparajita Ghosh	Music Director
2017	The Paperman (Short Film)	Abhiroop Basu	Music Director
2017	Sheyal Debota Rohoshyo - Feluda (Web Series)	Parambrata Chatterjee	Background Music
2017	Ghurghutiya'r Ghotona - Feluda (Web Series)	Parambrata Chatterjee	Background Music
2018	Gariahat-er Ganglords (Web Series)	Atreyee Sen	Music Director
2018	Rainbow Jelly	Soukarya Ghosal	Music Director
2018	Kaali (Web Series) Season 1	Korok Murmu	Music Director
2019	Sharate Aaj (Web Series)	Parambrata Chatterjee	Background Music
2019	Bhalobashar Shohor (Web Series)	Rohan Ghosh & Aritro Sen, Deepayan Chatterjee	Music Director
2020	Kaali (Web Series) Season 2	Rohan Ghosh & Aritro Sen	Music Director
2020	Mafia (Web Series)	Birsa Dasgupta	Music Director
2020	TikiTaka	Parambrata Chatterjee	Music Director
2020	SOS Kolkata	Anshuman Pratyush	Background Music
2020	Rawkto Rawhoshyo	Soukarya Ghosal	Music Director
2021	Tangra Blues	Supriyo Sen	Music Director
2021	Mukhosh	Birsa Dasgupta	Music Director
2021	Hare Krishna (Short Film)	Hindol Chakraborty	Music Director
2021	Bony	Parambrata Chatterjee	Background Music
2021	F.I.R	Joydeep Mukherjee	Background Music
2022	Shaaticup (TV series)	Mohammad Touqir Islam	Music
2022	Nagarbaul Katha	Aranyak Chatterjee	Music
2022	Shaaticup (TV series)	Mohammad Touqir Islam	Music
2023	Rahasyamoy	Soumyaa-Supriyaa	Music Director
2023	Doctor Bakshi	Saptaswa Basu	Music Director
2023	Shohorer Ushnotomo Din E	Aritra Sen	Music Director
2023	Biye Bibhrat	Raja Chanda	Background Score
2023	Nikhoj - The Search Begins	Aranyak Chatterjee	Music Director
2023	Parnashavarir Shaap (Web Series)	Parambrata Chatterjee	Music Director
2024	Sinpaat (Web Series)	Md. Touqir Islam	Music Director
2024	Bhootpori	Soukarya Ghosal	Music Director
2025	Bishohori (Web Series)	Srijit Roy	Music & Background Score
2025	Bhog (Web Series)	Parambrata Chattopadhyay	Background Score
2025	Pokhhirajer Dim	Soukarya Ghoshal	Music Director
2025	Juile (Web Series)	Aritra Sen	Music & Background Score
2025	Birangana (Web Series)	Nirjhar Mitra	Music & Background Score
2025	Anusandhan (Web Series)	Aditi Roy	Background Score
2025	Chhotu Byomkesh (Mini Series)	Kamaleshwar Mukhopadhyay	Background Score
2025	Amar Comrade (Short Film)	Tathagata Ghosh	Background Score
2026	Nikosh Chaya (Web series) Season 2	Sayantan Ghosal	Music and Background Score
2026	Adalot o Ekti Meye (Web series)	Kamaleshwar Mukherjee	Background Score
2026	Domm	Redoan Rony	Background Score
2026	Roktofolok (Web series)	Parambrata Chattopadhyay	Music and Background Score
2026	Kuheli (Web series)	Aditi Roy	Music and Background Score
2026	Byomkesh Bakshi (Web series Addatimes)	Aritra Sen	Background Score
2026	Bhalobashar Bari Season 2 (Mini Series)	Aritra Sen	Background Score
2026	Choddobeshi (Web series)	Aritra Sen	Music and Background Score
2026	Katukutu Buro	Ujaan Ganguly	Background Score
2026	Ajeya: Special Task Force (Webseries)	Ayan Chakraborty	Music director

=== As a vocalist ===
Year	Song	Film	Music director	Lyricist	Co-singer
2015	"Office Song"	Katmundu	Anupam Roy	Anupam Roy and Nabarun Bose (Rap portion)	
2015	"Jomer Raja Dilo Bor Title Track"	Jomer Raja Dilo Bor	Anupam Roy	Anupam Roy and Nabarun Bose (Rap portion)	Silajit Majumdar
2015	"Loadshedding Title Track"	Loadshedding	Nabarun Bose	Soukarya Ghosal	Prashmita Paul
2018	"Rainbow Jelly Title Track"	Rainbow Jelly	Soukarya Ghosal/ Nabarun Bose	Soukarya Ghosal	
2018	"Kaali Title Track"	Kaali	Nabarun Bose	Pranjal Das and Nabarun Bose (Rap portion)	Paloma Majumder
2023	"Krishno Aila Radhar Kunje"	Ghore Pherar Gaan	Prabuddha Banerjee	Rap Section by Nabarun Bose	Bonny Chakraborty

=== Jingles ===
- Jibon Gorar Gaan (2012) for George Telegraph S.C. – Music Arranger
- Ei Samay Theme Song (2012) for Ei Samay Sangbadpatra – Music Arranger
- Nomoshkar Kolkata (2017) for Central (Future Group) - Organ
- Hiland River (2019) for Hiland Group - Background Score
- PS Group Pujo (2019) for PS Group - Background Score
- Solaris Shalimar Eden Real Estate (2021) - Music Director
- Ruchi Masala Promo TVC (2021) - Music Director
- Shyam Steel (Feat.Manpreet Singh and Lovlina Borgohain) (2021) - Music Director
- Mio Amore- Fatafati Pujo Song (2023)- Music Director/composer
- Smart Bazaar Poila Boishakh Anthem (2025)- Music Director
- Smart Bazaar Pujo Anthem (2025)- Music Director
- Biskfarm Petit Beurre- Music Director
- Rollick Kulfi Summer Campaign (2026)- Music Director
- Mio Amore Fatafati 2.0 (Pujo Campaign) Music Director

=== Singles ===
- Second Sex (2013) with The Anupam Roy Band – Keyboard, Melodica & Backing Vocals
- Cha E Rock "Promo Song" (2016) with The Prophesor for Cha E Rock – Vocal, Music, Lyrics & Melodica
- Voter Baddi (2016) with Anupam Roy for ABP Ananda – Music Arranger & Programmer
- Pulse Rate (2017) for Aprokashito – Vocal, Music & Lyrics
- Poyla Rock Official Anthem Song (2018) - Vocal, Rap, Music Arranger & Programmer
- Jodi Phirey Dekhtam (2019) for Aprokashito - Vocal, Music & Lyrics
- Boitoronir Teere (2021) - Vocal, Music & Lyrics
- Biplob (2024) - Vocalist, Composer and arranger.

== Awards and nominations ==
- Mirchi Music Awards Bangla 2015 - Upcoming Male Vocalist of the Year: Office Song (Katmundu) - Nominated
- Mirchi Music Awards Bangla 2016 - Best Music Producer: Ghorir Kaantar Mawto (Shaheb Bibi Golaam) - Nominated
- WBFJA Awards 2019 - Best Background Music: Rainbow Jelly - Nominated
- Mirchi Music Awards Bangla 2018 - Best Song Producer (Programming and Arranging): Tui Ki Kore Dili (Ghare & Baire) - Winner
- Virgin Spring Cinefest 2021 - Best Music Score (Silver Award): Three Hours in Grayscale (Short Film) - Winner
- WBFJA Cinemar Samabartan 2021- Best Music Director for Tangra Blues-Winner.
- WBFJA Cinemar Samabartan 2021- Best Background Score- F.I. R- Nominated.
- Filmfare Awards East 2022- Nominated- Best Music Album- Tangra Blues
- Filmfare Awards East 2022- Nominated- Best Background Score- F.I. R
- Anandalok Awards 2022- Nominated- Best Music Director- Tangra Blues
- Binodone shera 2024- Best Background Score for Bhog- Nominated
