= Lagnajita Chakraborty =

Indian playback singer

- Born: Lagnajita Chakraborty
- Origin: Kolkata, India
- Genres: Filmi, Bengali Movie
- Occupations: Singer, actress
- Years active: 2014–present

Lagnajita Chakraborty is an Indian playback singer. She contributed her voice mainly singing in Bengali films. She achieved fame with a soulful track in the movie Chotushkone called Basanto Eshe Geche (Female version).

== Personal life ==
She was a student of Patha Bhavan, Kolkata, Nava Nalanda High School and later St. Xavier's College, Kolkata. She was one of the youngest singers from Kolkata to make a US musical tour. Chakraborty is recipient of "Sera Bangali" award of 2015, given by the Anandabazar Patrika.

== Acting ==
She had a role in a Bengali movie called Jodi Bolo Hyan, along with co-star Sreenanda Shankar. Other members of the cast included Mir, Anirban Bhattacharya, Sayan and Poulomi Basu.

== Discography ==
Films :

Title	Year	Film	Composer	Notes
Odol Bodol	2014	Pendulam	Mainak nag chowdhury	Film by Soukarya Ghosal
Bawshonto eshe gyache	2014	Chotushkone	Anupam Roy	
Thake joto tarai dure	2015	Onyo Bosonto	Moheener Ghoraguli	
Sokhi Rongo Koto Bol	2015	Rajkahini	Indraadip Dasgupta	
Aamar Maa,	2015	Mayer biye	Savvy Gupta	
E Bhabe Golpo Hok	2017	Bibaho Diaries	Savvy Gupta	
Projapoti Biskut title song	2017	Projapoti Biskut	Anindya Chatterjee	
Jaak chuloy Jaak	2017	Michael	Indrojit Dey	
Noor Jahaan title song	2018	Noor Jahaan	Savvy Gupta	
Hridoyer Rong	2018	Ghare And Baire	Anupam Roy	
Preme Pora Baron	2019	Sweater	Ranajoy_Bhattacharjee	
Amar Ektarata (আমার একতারাটা)	2020	Rawkto Rawhoshyo	Debdeep	Film by Soukarya Ghosal
Tomar Chokher Shitolpati	2020	Cheeni	Prasen	
Kotota Raat	2022	Mini		
Ekti Golpo Shunio	2025	Bhalo Theko (Web Drama)	Shafiq Tuhin	song from a Bangladeshi TV Drama

Albums :

Title	Albums	Composer	Notes
Bawshonto noy	Bawshonto noy	Rupankar, Raghab Chatterjee	
Ichegulo	Ichegulo	Aritra Banerjee	
"Dekhecho Ki Chokh Khule"	Mohin Ekhon O Bondhura	Gautam Chattopadhyay and Tapash Das	
Tumi Amay Dakle Keno	Tumi Amay Dakle Keno	Arpan Karmakar	
Mono Aji	Mono Aji	inspiration from Paimona Bideh Ki Khumaar Astam, a much loved kalaam by Omar Khayyam	
Aaji bijon ghore	Rendezvous with Tagore ep.1	Rabindra Sangeet	
Sara ta din (Re released)	Aprokashito	Raghab Chatterjee	Lyrics Srijato

== Filmography ==
Year	Film	Role	Notes
2014	Jodi Bolo Hyan	Hoimo	Zee Bangla original film

== Advertisement ==
Chakraborty has appeared with fellow Bengali singer Somlata Acharyya Chowdhury in a print advertisement for Coloroso Sarees.
