= Tushar Dutta =

Hindustani Classical Music Vocalist

Pandit Tushar Dutta
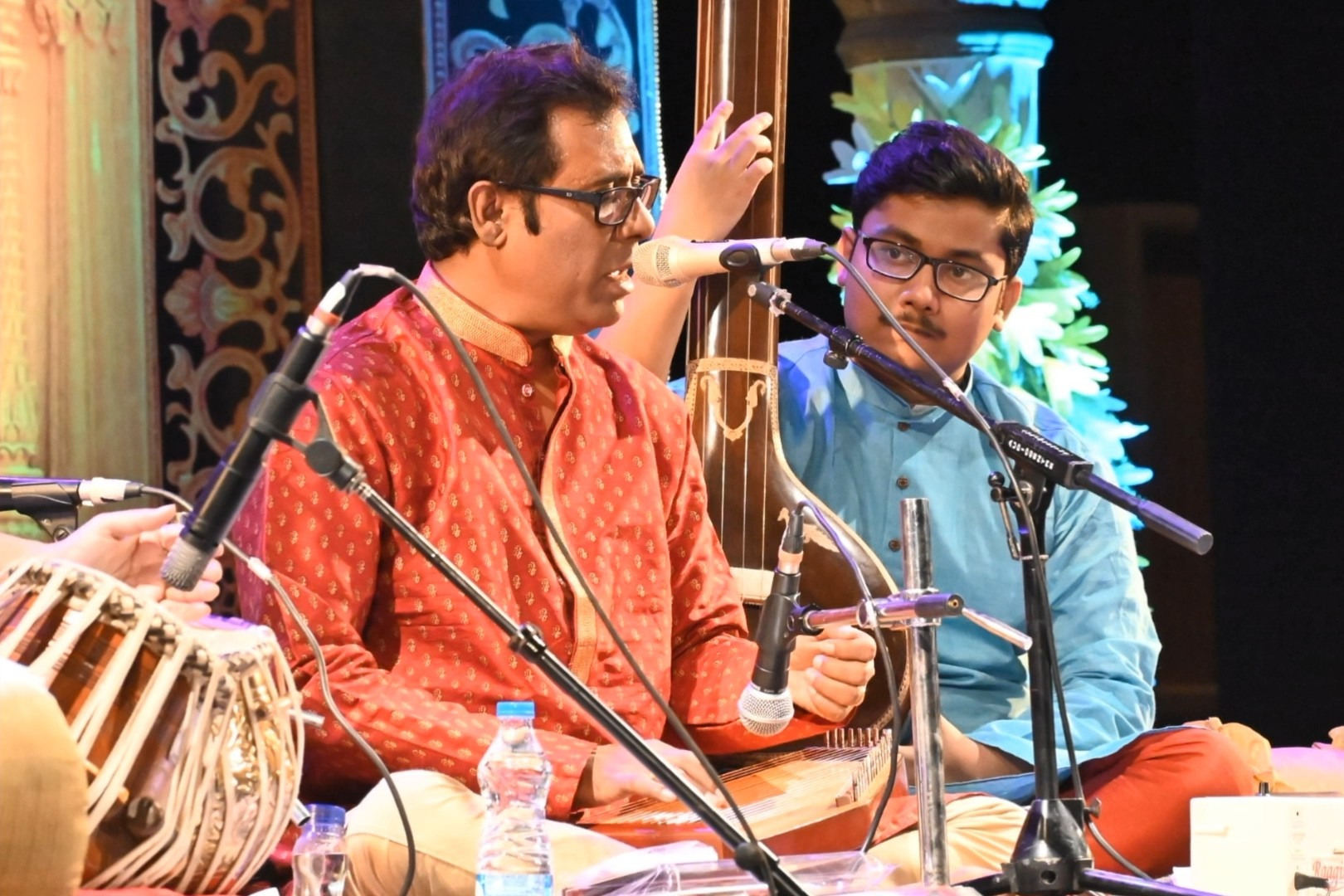

Background information
- Born: 18 August 1969 (age 56)
- Origin: Natore, Bangladesh
- Genres: Hindustani classical music, devotional, fusion, ghazal, thumri
- Occupation: Vocalist
- Years active: 1977–present

Pandit Tushar Dutta (Bengali: তুষার দত্ত, Urdu:تشار دتہ, Hindi: तुषार दत्त) is a Hindustani classical music and semi-classical vocalist.

== Early life ==
Tushar was born in Natore, Bangladesh. He started learning the fundamentals of Indian classical music from Bimal Mitra of Durgapur at an early age. He joined the ITC Sangeet Research Academy in 1983 and took Taalim under Arkut Kannabhirham and Arun Bhaduri in Kirana Gharana. He also took Taalim in Agra Gharana under K G Ginde and Sunil Bose and also from Subhra Guha. By blending the two musical styles Kirana and Agra Gharana he has made a unique style of his own.

== Career ==
Tushar is a Top Grade vocalist in All India Radio and Doordarshan India. In 1998, He stood first in Khayal at All India University competition in Banaras. He has received the title of "Surmani" from Sur Sringar Samsad of Mumbai. He was awarded the national Scholarship from the Ministry of Culture, Government of India.

He has playbacked for several movies, and also playbacked for Webseries Tansener Tanpura. In 2014, as a playback singer he bagged two awards in the 4th Mirchi Music Awards Bangla for the Bengali film Pendulum. He has performed all over India and abroad.

== Discography ==
- Subhah Shaam (2006)- classical
- Sur Sanchari (2007) - classical
- Kaalinaam Kalpotaru (2008) - devotional
- Tushar Dutta - Hindustani Vocal (2011)
- Raagas For Children (2011) - classical
- Biroohinee Chaand (2001) - semi classical
- Classical Trance of Tagore Songs (2012)
- Krishna Mantra (2012)) - devotional
- Tagore Trance (2013) - Tagore songs
- Durga (2013) - devotional
- Birohee (2014) - semi classical
- Gul Bagichaay (2014) - Nazrul Sangeet
- Suranjali (2015) - Nazrul Sangeet
- Saajan Aaore (2017) - classical
- Pragnya (Golden Swara) (2015) - classical
- Midnight Melody - classical
- Saanjh Bhai - classical
- Young Masters - classical
- Raag Rang (2017) - classical
- Sankalpana - classical
- Sparkling Voice - classical
- Sajan Aaayo Re - classical
- Ye Toh Karam Hain Maula - Sufi song
- Flowering Buds (2006) - classical
- Majestic Essence - classical
- Bhor Bhayo - classical
- Blessings - classical
- Raagmala - classical
- Morning Melody (2009) - classical
- Bhakti Raas - devotional
- Bandish Fusion (2016) - Fusion
- Bimona Bikel (2017) - "semi classical"
- Alimentic Records (Live in Nancy,2012) - classical
- Amruthavarsha Vol 2,5 - devotional
- Live in IGCC (In Bangladesh) - classical
- Charan Mandir - devotional
- Sadhguru Charan - devotional
- Mystic Moods of Kolkata - classical
- Live in India - The Baul & The Classicist
- Heart Beat (2008) - Jazz fusion
