= Shaaticup =

Bangladeshi crime drama streaming television series

- Bengali: শাটিকাপ
- Genre: Crime drama
- Screenplay by: Mohammad Touqir Islam; Omar Masum; Ahsabul Yamin Riad; Khalid Saifullah Saif
- Story by: Mohammad Touqir Islam
- Directed by: Mohammad Touqir Islam
- Theme music composer: Nabarun Bose
- Composer: Nabarun Bose
- Country of origin: Bangladesh
- Original language: Bengali
- No. of seasons: 1
- No. of episodes: 8

Production
- Executive producer: Amit Rudra
- Producer: Redoan Rony
- Production locations: Rajshahi, Bangladesh
- Cinematography: Mohammad Touqir Islam
- Editor: Saleh Sobhan Auneem
- Camera setup: Multi-camera
- Running time: 19-23 minutes
- Production company: Footprint Film Production

Original release
- Network: Chorki
- Release: 13 January 2022

Shaaticup (Bengali: শাটিকাপ) is a Bangladeshi crime drama streaming television series directed by Mohammad Touqir Islam. The eight-episode series was released on 13 January 2022 on Chorki.

== Premise ==
Hannan and Joynal plan to invade drug lord Sohel's monopoly kingdom. Sohel assigns Uttam, the most influential Investigation Officer in the area, to capture Hannan and Joynal. Several complex moves come one after another in this SnakeLudo game. Who will win this game? Drug lord, new traders, cunning officer, or anyone beyond imagination?

== Cast ==
- Ahsabul Yamin Riad as Joynal
- Omar Masum as Babu
- Amit Rudra as Uttam Kumar
- Najmus Saaqib as Hannan
- Sajia Khanom as Tuli (Babu's wife)
- Galib Sarder as Shohel Bhai
- Wasikul Islam Romit as Liakot Ali
- Mahinur Rahman Khan as Asad
- Mehdi Hasan Rumie as Kazi Maruf
- Akash bin Osama as Mizu Dakat
- Rifat Bin Sajid as Faju
- Kazi Sushmin Afsana as Lisa Aarzoomand
- Shiblee Noman as Habibul Bashar

== Production ==
Principal photography has taken place in different locations of Rajshahi, Bangladesh from October 2020 to August 2021.

== Release ==
Shaaticup aired on Chorki on 13 January 2022. A premiere screening was held in Rajshahi at District Council Auditorium on the same day.

== Episodes ==
| No. | Title | Directed by | Written by | Original release date |
|---|---|---|---|---|
| 1 | "Paaper Shuru" | Mohammad Touqir Islam | Mohammad Touqir Islam | 13 January 2022 |
| 2 | "Khidirbidir" | Mohammad Touqir Islam | Mohammad Touqir Islam | 13 January 2022 |
| 3 | "Vyatam" | Mohammad Touqir Islam | Mohammad Touqir Islam | 13 January 2022 |
| 4 | "Vyantara" | Mohammad Touqir Islam | Mohammad Touqir Islam | 13 January 2022 |
| 5 | "Hasher Pyach" | Mohammad Touqir Islam | Mohammad Touqir Islam | 13 January 2022 |
| 6 | "Velki" | Mohammad Touqir Islam | Mohammad Touqir Islam | 13 January 2022 |
| 7 | "Le Ghire Le" | Mohammad Touqir Islam | Mohammad Touqir Islam | 13 January 2022 |
| 8 | "Mathar Opor Saap, Baap re Baap!" | Mohammad Touqir Islam | Mohammad Touqir Islam | 13 January 2022 |

== Reception ==
Shadique Mahbub Islam of The Financial Express praised the series, commenting, "The series has retained its local flavour in its dialogues and character development, so much so that it feels like an authentic visual experience of the city, the char, the Padma river".

Sayed Arafat Zubayer of The Business Standard, praised the Chorki series Shaaticup for its realistic portrayal of Rajshahi's drug-trafficking underbelly. He highlighted director Mohammad Touqir Islam's effective screenplay and the decision to use a local cast and regional dialect, concluding that the show delivers an authentic and unique regional viewing experience despite minor character flaws.
