= Bibaho Diaries =

2017 Indian Bengali film by Mainak Bhaumik

- বিবাহ Diaries
- Directed by: Mainak Bhaumik
- Screenplay by: Saurav Palodhi
- Produced by: Rupa Datta
- Starring: Ritwick Chakraborty; Sohini Sarkar; Kamalika Banerjee; Biswanath Basu
- Cinematography: Gairik Sarkar
- Edited by: Pronoy Dasgupta
- Music by: Savvy
- Production company: Camellia Productions Pvt. Ltd.
- Distributed by: Eros International
- Release date: 20 January 2017
- Country: India
- Language: Bengali

Bibaho Diaries (2017) is an Indian Bengali-language romantic comedy film directed by Mainak Bhaumik and produced by Rupa Datta, under the banner of Camellia Productions. It stars Ritwick Chakraborty and Sohini Sarkar in lead roles. A sequel of the movie is in the offing.

== Plot ==
This story is about what a couple today looks like under a microscope before and after marriage.

== Controversy ==
Prior to the release of the film, director Mainak Bhaumik was accused of copying his own film, Ami vs Tumi. Arijit Biswas, who holds complete rights to the film Ami vs Tumi, filed a complaint with the Eastern India Motion Pictures Association (EIMPA).

== Awards ==
- Best Bengali Film (2017) - by Hyderabad Bengali Film Festival
- Jio Filmfare Awards (East) (2018) - nomination

== Soundtrack ==
No.	Title	Artist
1	"Tumi Nei"	Savvy
2	"E Bhabe Golpo Hok"	Lagnajita Chakraborty
3	"Khelna Bati Mon"	Anupam Roy
4	"Nachorbanda Mon"	Somlata Acharyya Chowdhury
