= Katmundu =

2015 Indian Bengali film

- Katmundu Movie Poster
- Directed by: Raj Chakraborty
- Written by: Padmanabha Dasgupta
- Produced by: Shyam Sundar Dey
- Starring: Abir Chatterjee; Soham Chakraborty; Rudranil Ghosh; Srabanti Chatterjee; Mimi Chakraborty; Saswata Chatterjee
- Music by: Anupam Roy
- Production company: GreenTouch Entertainment
- Release date: 16 October 2015
- Country: India
- Language: Bengali
- Budget: ₹4 crore (US$420,000)
- Box office: ₹4.5 crore (US$470,000) (42 Days Collection)

Katmundu is a 2015 Indian Bengali comedy romantic thriller film directed by Raj Chakraborty. The film features Soham Chakraborty, Abir Chatterjee, Rudranil Ghosh, Srabanti Chatterjee, Mimi Chakraborty and Saswata Chatterjee in the lead roles. The film is produced by Shyam Sundar Dey under GreenTouch Entertainment. The film was released on 16 October 2015. The story, penned down by Padmanava Dasgupta, is about three software engineers who undertake a journey to Nepal to escape the stress of a 9-to-5 job and how their life takes an unexpected turn after meeting three girls on their way, forms the crux of the story. According to the director, the film was a tribute to the inhabitants of Nepal alongwith the 2015 earthquake of Nepal that occurred a few months before the release of the film.

== Cast ==
- Soham Chakraborty as Sunny Ghosh
- Abir Chatterjee as Pablo Bose
- Rudranil Ghosh as Siddharth Sikdar / Sidhu
- Srabanti Chatterjee as Pallabi
- Mimi Chakraborty as Rai
- Saswata Chatterjee as Aiyoswami
- Roja Paromita Dey as Kanchi
- Malobika Banerjee as Minakshi
- Ekavali Khanna
- Sanjit Mahato

== Production ==
The film went on the floors from 5 November 2014. Mimi Chakraborty has been cast as Soham Chakraborty's girlfriend, Srabanti Chatterjee as Abir Chatterjee's girlfriend while Rudranil Ghosh plays other pivotal role. Saswata Chatterjee plays the boss of the office in which the male protagonists work. Model Roja Dey, who debuted on the silver screen with this film, will play the role of a Nepali. The music is given by Anupam Roy, while Sirsha Ray has been roped in as the DoP. Parts of the film has been canned in Darjeeling, Sikkim and Kolkata.

== Soundtrack ==
The soundtrack of the film, which is composed and written by Anupam Roy, has six tracks. Nabarun Bose, keyboard player and programmer of The Anupam Roy Band, debuted as a playback singer with this film. The soundtrack of the film was released in Kolkata on 25 September 2015 in the presence of the cast and crew.

All music is composed by Anupam Roy.

Songs
| No. | Title | Singer(S) | Length |
|---|---|---|---|
| 1. | "Aami Raaji" | Arijit Singh, Anupam Roy |
| 2. | "Eto Aalo" | Shreya Ghoshal |
| 3. | "Bhorer Tara" | Anupam Roy |
| 4. | "Office Song" | Nabarun Bose |
| 5. | "Mon Amaar" | Anupam Roy, Prashmita Paul |
| 6. | "Amra Korina Piyaji" | Abir, Soham, Rudranil |

== Critical reception ==
Zinia Sen of The Times of India reviewed "All the actors add to the revelry that this hilarious script by Padmanabha Dasgupta ensures. There are smart lines too many, and most work despite the heavy sexual undertones. But the narrative is not entirely devoid of glitches. The beautiful sunkissed pre-quake Nepal comes alive with Sirsha Ray's deft handling of the camera and some euphoric un-Anupam Roy numbers by Anupam Roy. The opening scene leaves a mark and sets the tone for the laughathon ahead. In the end, as Raj Chakrabarty chooses north over south, we don't really give a damn. It's cinema, both smart and with a heart."

== Sequel ==
Buoyed by the success of Katmundu, director Raj Chakraborty announced a sequel Katmundu 2 Cambodia but it was shelved.

Box office: Katmundu film's budget was 4 crore Rs & it crosses 4.5c Rs in 28 days.
