= Michhil =

2020 Indian Bengali film

- Directed by: Surajit Nag, Ujjwal Basu
- Based on: Shreemoyee by Pracheta Gupta
- Produced by: Surajit Nag Films
- Starring: Basabdatta Chatterjee, Shantilal Mukherjee, Samadarshi Dutta, Bhaswar Chatterjee, Falguni Chattopadhya, Rumki Chattopadhyay
- Release date: 24 January 2020
- Country: India
- Language: Bengali

Michhil (transl. The Procession) is a Bengali political drama film directed by Surajit Nag and Ujjwal Basu. This film was based on Shreemoyee, a novel of Pracheta Gupta. The film was released on 24 January 2020 under the banner of Surajit Nag Films.

== Plot ==
The plot revolves around the life of Shreemoyee, the only daughter of a middle-class family. Her marriage to Tapodhir is fixed. Incidentally she joins in a political rally which creates serious problems in her marriage. Highly ambitious Shreemoyee cancels her marriage, starts her political career and enters into the dirty world of politics. It changes her life forever.

== Cast ==
- Basabdatta Chatterjee as Shreemoyee
- Shantilal Mukherjee
- Samadarshi Dutta
- Bhaswar Chatterjee
- Falguni Chattopadhya
- Rumki Chattopadhyay
