= SOS Kolkata =

2020 Indian Bengali action-thriller film

- SOS Kolkata Movie Poster
- Directed by: Anshuman Pratyush
- Written by: Anshuman Pratyush
- Produced by: Anshuman Pratyush; Ena Saha; Banani Saha
- Starring: Yash Dasgupta; Mimi Chakraborty; Nusrat Jahan; Ena Saha
- Cinematography: Ramyadip Saha
- Edited by: Md. Kalam
- Music by: Nabarun Bose
- Production companies: Jarek Entertainment; Pratyush Production
- Distributed by: Zee5
- Release date: 21 October 2020
- Country: India
- Language: Bengali

SOS Kolkata is a 2020 Indian Bengali-language action thriller film written and directed by Anshuman Pratyush and produced by Jarek Entertainment and Pratyush Production. The film starring Yash Dasgupta, Mimi Chakraborty, Nusrat Jahan and Sabyasachi Chakraborty is about a suspected terrorist attack and how the army, police and the common people come together to save lives and work against wrongdoings. The filming resumed on 6 July 2020, after lockdown due to the pandemic.

The film was released in theatres on 21 October 2020, coinciding with Puja holidays. The production of the film was delayed due to the COVID-19 pandemic. It got mixed reviews, but with properness, it is being negatively reviewed.

== Synopsis ==
Half a dozen jihadis, led by terrorist Aftab Ansari(Amin Gazi), have entered Kolkata to avenge the Mumbai attacks. Aftab has a personal grudge against Special Task Force leader Zakir Ahmed (Yash Dasgupta). Aftab masterminds a series of attacks in Kolkata, ending in a hostage situation in the premises of a 5-star hotel, JW Marriott. Zakir Ahmed, who had lost his wife, Sanjana (Mimi Chakraborty), in an attack by Aftab, is on the scene with ATS technical head Amanda Jones (Nusrat Jahan) to conduct a rescue operation and arrest the jihadis.

== Cast ==
- Yash Dasgupta as ATS officer Zakir Ahmed
- Mimi Chakraborty as Sanjana, Zakir's wife
- Nusrat Jahan as ATS officer and Zakir's colleague Amanda Jones
- Amin Gazi as Aftab Ansari, a terrorist
- Ena Saha as Angel D'Souza, manager of Chariott Hotel
- Sabyasachi Chakraborty as Raghav Sen, Senior Security Advisor and ISI agent
- Shantilal Mukherjee as retired army general Matthew Henriques
- Rupa Bhattacharya as IPS Nandita Roy
- Sudip Mukherjee as ATS chief

== Promotion and release ==
The promotional campaign was launched on 2 October 2020, with the unlock guidelines for the opening of theatres set in by MOH, the film promotion started with the release of a teaser.

The film is scheduled to be released in theatres on 21 October 2020, coinciding with Puja holidays.

== Soundtrack ==
SOS Kolkata

Soundtrack album by Savvy - Pratik Kundu
- Recorded: 2020
- Studio: Future Sound Of Bombay
- Genre: Feature film soundtrack
- Length: 10:17
- Language: Bengali
- Label: Jarek Entertainment

Savvy - Pratik Kundu chronology
Love Story (2020)	SOS Kolkata (2020)	Switzerland (2020)

The soundtrack of the film is composed by Savvy - Pratik Kundu and lyrics by Pratik Kundu and Ritam. The song "Thik Bhul Bhule Aam" from soundtrack is melodious. Anwesha Dutta Gupta's rendition of the song on composition by Savvy and Pratik Kundu is soulful.

Track listing
No.	Title	Lyrics	Music	Singer(s)	Length
1.	"Thik Bhul Bhule Aam"	Pratik Kundu	Savvy - Pratik Kundu	Anwesha Dutta Gupta, Pratik Kundu	3:22
2.	"Raagi Raja"	Ritam Sen	Savvy	Oindrila Sanyal, Nikhita Gandhi, Dev Arijit	3:21
3.	"Har Manbo Na"	Pratik Kundu	Pratik Kundu	Farhad Bhiwandiwala, Arpita Das, Pratik Kundu	3:34
Total length:					10:17

== Reception ==
=== Critical response ===
Upam Buzarbaruah, writing for The Times of India gave three stars out of five and termed it as "An unimpressive combination of action and drama." Buzarbaruah opined that in spite of the weak script team SOS Kolkata has put up a decent show. He praised acting, music and the special effects, but was critical that research and character sketches were not given due importance. He concluded the review with the remark, "Overall, SOS Kolkata is a one-time watch at best."
