= OCD (film) =

2026 Indian Bengali thriller film by Soukarya Ghoshal

- Directed by: Soukarya Ghosal
- Written by: Soukarya Ghosal
- Produced by: Pooja Chatterjee; Soukarya Ghosal
- Starring: Jaya Ahsan; Kaushik Sen; Arshiya Mukherjee; Anashua Majumdar; Koneenica Banerjee; Fazlur Rahman Babu
- Cinematography: Aalok Maity
- Edited by: Arghyakamal Mitra
- Music by: Megh Banerjee
- Production company: Indigenus Films LLP
- Distributed by: SSR Cinemas Pvt LTD
- Release date: 6 February 2026 (India)
- Running time: 129 minutes
- Country: India
- Language: Bengali

OCD is a 2026 Indian Bengali-language psychological thriller film written and directed by Soukarya Ghosal. The film stars Jaya Ahsan in the lead role as a medical professional grappling with childhood trauma, supported by Kaushik Sen, Arshiya Mukherjee, Anasuya Mazumdar, Koneenica Banerjee, and Fazlur Rahman Babu.

The film had its world premiere in the Indian Language Competition section at the 28th Kolkata International Film Festival (KIFF) in 2022. Despite its title, OCD looks past surface-level symptoms to tackle a critical and often silenced subject—child abuse.

== Plot ==
Shweta (Jaya Ahsan) is a successful doctor who suffers from a pathological obsession with cleanliness, rooted in the belief that "cleanliness is godliness." This obsession was fostered by her grandmother as a psychological shield against "obscene" people.

Decades later, Shweta's convictions are challenged when she discovers that a pedophile neighbor continues to live a normal, respected life despite his past. This revelation triggers repressed memories of Shweta being molested by the same man as a child. To reconcile her internal belief system, she plots what she considers an "unmuddled" or "perfect" murder a crime free of any physical or moral blemish. The narrative follows her psychological descent as she attempts to "purify" her past through lethal means.

While the film depicts the symptoms of obsessive–compulsive disorder (OCD), its narrative primarily examines the consequences of victims' silence, resulting from either a lack of comprehension or the suppression of allegations due to social stigma.

== Cast ==
- Jaya Ahsan as Shweta
- Kaushik Sen as the MLA
- Anashua Majumdar as Grandma
- Arshiya Mukherjee as Shonai
- Koneenica Banerjee as the Landlady
- Fazlur Rahman Babu as the investigator

== Theme and production ==
Director Soukarya Ghosal stated that the film is a critique of the "social silence" surrounding child sexual abuse and the hypocrisy of moral standards in South Asian society. The film marks the debut of child actor Arshiya Mukherjee in a feature film. The film shines a rare light on the complexities of psychological trauma, exploring the long-term impact of childhood abuse—a thematic territory seldom navigated by Bengali filmmakers.

Ghosal utilized Obsessive–compulsive disorder as a central metaphor for the survivor's attempt to "wash away" the stains of trauma. This is the second collaboration between Soukarya Ghosal and Jaya Ahsan following Bhootpori. A major portion of the film was filmed in Jharkhand.

== Release ==
After its festival run in 2022, the film faced delays but was officially scheduled for a wide theatrical release on 6 February 2026. The Official Poster was released on 1 January 2026. The official trailer was released on 27 January 2026, receiving coverage across major Indian and Bangladeshi news outlets for its dark atmosphere and thematic depth.

== Reception ==
On 17 December 2022 the film was premiered in Kolkata International Film Festival at Nandan under Indian Competition section.

Poorna Banerjee of The Times of India said that "Soukarya Ghoshal’s latest film is framed as a psychological thriller rooted in childhood trauma, but it soon reveals itself to be far more layered."
