= Pendulum (2014 film) =

2014 film by Soukarya Ghosal

- Movie poster
- Bengali: পেন্ডুলাম
- Directed by: Soukarya Ghosal
- Screenplay by: Soukarya Ghosal
- Story by: Soukarya Ghosal
- Produced by: Cozum Analytics Limited
- Starring: Radhika Apte; Rajesh Sharma; Sreelekha Mitra; Rajatava Dutta; Subhasish Mukherjee; Shantilal Mukherjee; Samadarshi Dutta
- Edited by: Mita Chakraborty
- Music by: Mainak Nag Chowdhury
- Color process: Technicolor
- Distributed by: Cozum Analytics
- Release date: 7 March 2014 (Kolkata)
- Running time: 130 minute
- Country: India
- Language: Bengali

Pendulum (Bengali: পেন্ডুলাম) is a 2014 Bengali language Indian thriller based on surrealism time travel written and directed by Soukarya Ghosal and starring Radhika Apte, Rajesh Sharma, Sreelekha Mitra, Rajatava Dutta, Subhasish Mukherjee, Shantilal Mukherjee, and Samadarshi Dutta. The film is based on a surrealistic painter who can provide time travel experience to his audience and can physically take them into his virtual world of painting. Through his painting, he travels time and tries to settle the disputes of several lives in Kolkata, affecting different individuals in a chain system.

== Plot ==
A car accident caused by Nandita, a young girl from the advertisement world is the sole truth moment of this hyperlink cinema, where five different stories are intertwined. The accident is shown thrice in the film, from three different povs of time.

First, it is shown in the real-time frame, second, it is shown in the flashback of Anirudhha, one of the characters of the film, and for the third time, it is shown in the virtual space of a Painter’s work.

The Painter lives in a dilapidated house in north Kolkata as one of the tenants. He practices a strange kind of art in his own closed room. After every painting is done, he takes out his secret bottle of colour from an iron safe. The colour is black and never ever spills out from the bottle even if it drops on the floor uncorked. The secret colour is actually made with the same element that creates black hole out there in space. The painter draws a labyrinth with that colour on the painting which actually creates a wormhole that acts as a shortcut to the virtual world of his canvas. A non-Bengali builder buys the house and plans for demolishing it to make a shopping mall.

== Cast ==
Actor	Role
Radhika Apte	Nandini
Rajesh Sharma	Builder
Sreelekha Mitra	Bublu
Rajatava Dutta	Chitresh
Subhasish Mukherjee	Painter
Shantilal Mukherjee	Driver
Samadarshi Dutta	Baban

== Soundtrack ==
Pendulum

Soundtrack album by Mainak Nag Chowdhury
- Released: 2014
- Genre: Feature film soundtrack
- Length: 28:48
- Language: Bengali

The Music of the film is composed by debutant music director Mainak Nag Chowdhury. The sound design is done by Sukanta Majumder. Out of five original songs, Chandril Bhattacharya and Anindya Chatterjee who won National Film Award for best lyrics have penned two. Ghosal has written the other three songs. The soundtrack was released by Cozum Analytics. The full music album was released in 2014.

No.	Title	Writer(s)	Singer(s)	Length
1.	"Unki Diley Jhunki Hoy"	Chandril Bhattacharya	Tushar Dutta	5:57
2.	"E Kalo Golpo"	Anindya Chatterjee	Anindya Chatterjee	5:36
3.	"Kauke Janachhina"	Soukarya Ghosal	Somlata Acharyya Chowdhury	6:55
4.	"Odol Bodol"	Soukarya Ghosal	Lagnajita Chakraborty, Gorki Mukherjee	5:34
5.	"Sohore Ekhono"	Soukarya Ghosal	Sanchita Roy	2:20
6.	"Nath Be Sar"	Traditional	Sayani Palit	1:09
7.	"Ab Ke Sawan"	Traditional	Ivy Banerjee	2:44
Total length:				28:48

== Reception ==
The film was released on 7 March 2014 in India and received positive critical reviews."The use of music in Pendulum is very intelligent, it creeps up on your senses. The music has come together very seamlessly, never intruding in the mood of the scenes," says Filmmaker Srijit Mukherji in an interview to The Telegraph.

== Awards ==
Ceremony	Category	Nominee	Result
Mirchi Music awards 2014 Bangla Radio Mirchi	Upcoming Male Vocalist of the year	Tushar Dutta for the song Unki Diley Jhunki Hoy	Won
Mirchi Music awards 2014 Bangla Radio Mirchi	Upcoming Female Vocalist of the year	Ivy Banerjee for the song Old Lady's Theme	Won
Mirchi Music awards 2014 Bangla Radio Mirchi	Programmer of the year	Tushar Dutta for the song Unki Diley Jhunki Hoy	Won
