= Hyderabad Bengali Film Festival =

Indian film festival

- Location: Prasad Film Labs, Hyderabad, India
- Founded: 2014
- Awards: Viewers Choice
- Hosted by: Bengalis in Hyderabad
- Selector: Ratnottama Sengupta
- Festival date: 21–24 June 2018
- Website: www.hbff.in bengalisinhyderabad.com

Hyderabad Bengali Film Festival (HBFF) is a Bengali film festival in the city of Hyderabad and is being organized annually since 2014. The venue of the festival is the Prasad Film Preview Labs, Hyderabad (adjacent to L V Prasad Eye Institute). The first edition of the film festival was held in the year 2014. It is the only curated Bengali film festival in India.

The festival is organized by a Hyderabad-based registered Bengali group- Bengalis in Hyderabad (popularly known as BiH). The fourth edition of the HBFF was held from 30 June to 2 July 2017. The fourth edition of the festival screened eight Bengali movies, along with two Telugu movies. All the seasons of the festival were attended by the directors, casts and crews of the movies which were screened, and there are several panel discussions and Q&A sessions with directors organized.

== History of Hyderabad Bengali Film Festival (HBFF) ==
=== 5th Edition of Hyderabad Bengali Film Festival (HBFF), 2018 ===
The fifth edition of Hyderabad Bengali Film Festival was held from 21 June to 24 June 2018. The initiative of the cultural exchange programme was introduced last year. As the part of cultural exchange apart from Bengali movies, premiere screening of a Marathi movie was also organised along with 12 other Bengali movies.

The fifth year saw the introduction of short film and documentary section rightly named SEED. The competitive short film section saw more than 50 entries coming from various languages including Sinhalese(Sri Lanka), Bangla (Bangladesh) and other Indian languages like Tamil, Telugu, Malayalam and Bengali. After much deliberation by the Jury, 17 short films were selected and screened. The short film and documentary section was held at the Ramanaidu Film School, Hyderabad.

In the documentary section, two documentaries were premiered in the festival. Thy Daughter O' Mother Earth: A documentary on the life & work of the legendary dancer & cultural anthropologist Manjushree Chaki Sarkar was made by noted filmmaker Shekhar Das. Meeting a Milestone (A documentary on India's Shehnai maestro Ustad Bismillah Khan) made by another famous filmmaker Goutam Ghose was also premiered at the festival.

The competitive section huge response and entries came in various languages including Kurdish(Iraq) among other documentaries with varied subjects. 6 documentaries were selected and screened from the entries.

The inaugural movie was Iye(The Others) directed by noted theater personality and film maker Mr. Debesh Chattopadhyay, starring Debshankar Haldar, Arpita Ghosh and Nitya Ganguly among others. The closing film of the festival was Mayurakshi by noted filmmaker Atanu Ghosh, starring Soumitra Chatterjee and Prosenjit Chatterjee among others.

The feature film edition of the 5th year also saw return to classic - featuring Tarun Majumder section which showcased two films Alo, and Nimontron by the eminent filmmaker Tarun Majumder. Each of the films were followed by a discussion with the person himself and a special discussion session was also arranged with Tarun Majumder moderated by eminent film critic Siladitya Sen.

This edition of the festival also introduced an exhibition of the artworks, cover designs, first drafts etc. made by internationally revered and honored Indian filmmaker Satyajit Ray and curated by Sandip Ray.

==== Official Selection of HBFF 2018 ====
1. Iye (Inaugural Film)
2. Benche Thakar Gan (Competitive Section)
3. Under Construction (Competitive Section)
4. Sonar Pahar (Competitive Section)
5. Rainbow Jelly (Competitive Section)
6. Goodnight City (Competitive Section)
7. Alifa (Competitive Section)
8. Roktokorobi (Competitive Section)
9. Pupa (Competitive Section)
10. AndarKahini (Competitive Section)
11. Aaron (Guest Language - Marathi)
12. Nimantran (Return to classics)
13. Alo (Return to classics)
14. Mayurakshi (Closing Film)

==== Official Delegates List for HBFF 2018 ====
1. Tarun Majumder
2. Rituparna Sengupta
3. Swastika Mukherjee
4. Sudipta Chakraborty
5. Gargi Roychowdhury
6. Mumtaz Sircar
7. Abhijit Guha
8. Sudeshna Roy
9. Soukarya Ghoshal
10. Kamaleswar Mukherjee
11. Amitava Bhattachaya
12. Rituparna Thakur
13. Indrasish Acharya
14. Arnab Middya
15. Furdausul Hasan
16. Siladitya Sen
17. Shekhar Das
18. Satarupa Sanyal
19. Debesh Chattopdhyay
20. Arpita Ghosh
21. Arghyakamal Mitra
22. Rishi Nikam

==== Award List for HBFF 2018 ====
Viewers' Choice Awards were:

1. Best Supporting Actor, Female (Viewers' Choice Award)- Sudipta Chakraborty for the movie Pupa
2. Best Supporting Actor, Male (Viewers' Choice Award)- Parambrata Chatterjee for the movie Sonar Pahar
3. Best Actor, Female (Viewers' Choice Award)- Tanuja for the movie Sonar Pahar
4. Best Actor, Male(Viewers' Choice Award)- Mahabrata Basu for the movie Rainbow Jelly
5. Best Actor in Negative Role (Viewers' Choice Award)- Prasun Gain for the movie Alifa
6. Best Film (Viewers' Choice Award)- Rainbow Jelly

Jury Awards were:

1. Best Makeup (Jury Award)- Md. Yunus for the movie AndarKahini
2. Best Editing (Jury Award)- Arghyakamal Mitra for the movie Rainbow Jelly
3. Best Cinematography (Jury Award) - Goodnight City
4. Best Music (Jury Award)- AndarKahini
5. Best Screenplay (Jury Award) - Rainbow Jelly
6. Best Actor, Male (Jury Award) - Ritwick Chakraborty for the film Goodnight City
7. Best Actor, Female (Jury Award) - Priyanka Sarkar for the film AndarKahini
8. Best Director (Jury Award) - Indrasish Acharya for the film Pupa
9. Best Film (Jury Award) - Rainbow Jelly
10. Special Mention (Jury Awards)- film Under Construction

=== 4th Edition of Hyderabad Bengali Film Festival (HBFF), 2017 ===
The fourth edition of Hyderabad Bengali Film Festival was held from 30 June to 2 July 2017. This year, under a cultural exchange programme, two noted Telugu movies was screened along with eight Bengali movies.

The inaugural movie was Tope by noted film maker Buddhadeb Dasgupta which was premiered earlier in Toronto International Film Festival. The festival introduced two Telugu films as the festival aims in offering a platform for culture exchange through cinematic languages.

As this year, the iconic Bengali detective character Feluda (created by Satyajit Ray) is completing 50 years, there was a special selection as a tribute to the iconic character which included two movies, Feluda: 50 Years Of Ray's Detective (a documentary film), and Sandip Ray's Bombaiyer Bombete (2003 film).

Other than Guest Language section, Inaugural film and Feluda50 section, there were five Bengali movies which were screened in the festival under the Competitive Section- these five movies are listed down from no. 6 to no. 10.

==== Official Selection of HBFF 2017 ====
1. Tope (inaugural film)
2. Pelli Choopulu (Guest Language- Telugu)
3. Naa Bangaaru Talli (Guest Language- Telugu)
4. Feluda- 50 Years Of Ray's Detective (a documentary film- under Feluda 50 section)
5. Bombaiyer Bombete (under Feluda 50 section)
6. Abby Sen
7. Asamapto
8. Bisorjon (National Award Winner for Best Feature Film in Bengali)
9. Bibaho Diaries
10. Peace Haven

==== Official Delegates List for HBFF 2017 ====
1. Abir Chatterjee (lead actor- Abby Sen & Bisorjon)
2. Sabyasachi Chakraborty (actor- Bombaiyer Bombete; acted as Feluda in five feature films and many telefilms), along with wife and actress Mithu Chakrabarty
3. Swastika Mukherjee (lead actress- Asamapto)
4. Kaushik Ganguly (director- Bisorjon)
5. Buddhadeb Dasgupta (director- Tope)
6. Sohini Dasgupta (associate producer- Tope)
7. Mainak Bhaumik (director- Bibaho Diaries)
8. Suman Mukhopadhyay (director- Asamapto)
9. Suman Ghosh (director- Peace Haven)
10. Atanu Ghosh (director- Abby Sen)
11. Rajesh Touchriver (director- Naa Bangaaru Talli)
12. Padmashri Sunitha Krishnan (producer- Naa Bangaaru Talli)
13. Satarupa Sanyal (film maker, present as jury)
14. K. N. T. Sastry (film maker, present as jury)
15. Debesh Chattopadhyay (film maker and theater director, present as mentor)
16. Arpita Ghosh (Hon'ble MP and theatre director)

==== Award List for HBFF 2017 ====
In the 4th year of HBFF, the festival has started two sets of awards- the Viewers' Choice Awards and the Jury Awards. Jury Awards were presented in association with Federation of Film Societies of India (FFSI), and awards were decided by 3 jury members- film makers KNT Shastry and Satarupa Sanyal, and film journalist Premendra Mazumder.

Viewers' Choice Awards were:

1. Best Supporting Actor, Female (Viewers' Choice Award)- Kamalika Banerjee for the movie Bibaho Diaries
2. Best Supporting Actor, Male (Viewers' Choice Award)- Kaushik Ganguly for the movie Bishorjan
3. Best Actor, Female (Viewers' Choice Award)- Jaya Ahsan for the movie Bishorjan
4. Best Actor, Male(Viewers' Choice Award)- Ritwick Chakraborty for the movie Bibaho Diaries
5. Best Film (Viewers' Choice Award)- Bishorjan
6. Best Director (Viewers' Choice Award)- Kaushik Ganguly for the movie Bishorjan

Jury Awards were:

1. Best Actor, Female (Jury Award)- Jaya Ahsan for the movie Bishorjan
2. Best Actor, Male (Jury Award)- Bratya Basu for the movie Asamapto
3. Best Film (Jury Award)- Peace Haven
4. Best Director (Jury Award)- Suman Mukhopadhyay for the movie Asamapto
5. Special Mention (Jury Awards)- film Abby Sen

=== 3rd Edition of Hyderabad Bengali Film Festival (HBFF), 2016 ===
The third edition of Hyderabad Bengali Film Festival was held from 1–3 July 2016. As always, eight films have been showcased, followed by Q&A sessions with directors and eminent film personalities. This edition of festival is also curated by Ratnottama Sengupta, a noted film critic.

The titles for this year being Cinemawala, Onyo Opala, Anubrata Bhalo Acho?, Natoker Moto, Asha Jaoar Majhe, and Babar Naam Gandhiji. Additionally, HBFF also made Indian premier of two films - Kolkatar King and Bridge.

As always, HBFF hosted several directors and producers from the film industry. The guests include such names as Satarupa Sanyal (director of Onyo Apala), Paramita Banerjee (producer of Bridge), Debesh Chattopadhyay (director of Natoker Moto), Pavel (director of Babar Naam Gandhiji), Judhajit Sarkar (director of Kolkatar King), Partha Sen (director of Anubrata Bhalo Acho?) and Dr. Amit Ranjan Biswas (director of Bridge).

==== Official Selection of HBFF 2016 ====
1. Bridge (Premier)
2. Kolkatar King (Premier)
3. Anubrata Bhalo Aachho?
4. Asa Jaoar Maajhe
5. Babar Naam Gandhiji
6. Natoker Moto
7. Onyo Opala
8. Cinemawala

==== Viewers' Choice Award ====
Hyderabad Bengali Film Festival (HBFF) is introducing a Viewers’ Choice Award for the first time in 2016. The audience will get to vote for the best movie, actor, director, etc. among the selection, and basis upon a composite scoring pattern, the winner in category will be decided. The entire voting process will be audited by a panel of independent auditors.

The categories for the Viewers' Choice Award are:

- Best Feature Film
- Best Director
- Best Actor
- Best Actress

The first edition of awards (for HBFF 2016) went to the following people/ movies:

- Viewers' Choice Award for Best Feature Film: Natoker Moto
- Viewers' Choice Award for Best Director: Pavel (for the movie Babar Naam Gandhiji)
- Viewers' Choice Award for Best Actor: Surajit Mukherjee a.k.a. Kecho (for the movie Babar Naam Gandhiji)
- Viewers' Choice Award for Best Actress: Paoli Dam (for the movie Natoker Moto)

Apart from the Viewers' Choice Awards, the Festival also gave out a Special Jury Mention Award to the movie Asa Jaoar Majhe.

Along with the Festival organizers, the Film Critics Circle of India (FCCI) also awarded two special awards in the festival:

- Critics' Award for Best Debutante Director by Film Critics Circle of India (FCCI): Debesh Chattopadhyay' (for the movie Natoker Moto)
- Critics' Award: Special Jury Mention by Film Critics Circle of India (FCCI): Cinemawala

=== 2nd Edition of Hyderabad Bengali Film Festival (HBFF), 2015 ===
The second edition of Hyderabad Bengali Film Festival was better, bigger and more widely covered in media. The festival took place from 26 to 28 June 2015 and screened eight movies, viz., Kadambari, Bitnoon, Jogajog, Nirbaak, Nirbashito (which was India's official selection for Academy Awards in the category of Best Foreign Film), Family Album, Chotoder Chobi (National Award for Best Film on Other Social Issues) and Teenkahon.

Luminaries in attendance included members of the Telugu film sphere, while the Bengali film industry was represented by National award-winning actress Ananya Chatterjee (lead actress of movie Jogajog), actress and director Churni Ganguly (lead actress and director of Nirbashito, which got the National Award for Best Feature Film in Bengali), Director Mainak Bhaumik (director of movie Family Album), Director Bauddhayan Mukherji (director of Teenkahon), Director duo Abhijit Guha and Sudeshna Roy (directors of movie Bitnoon), Director Sekhar Das (director of movie Jogajog) among others. Almost all the shows were houseful, and audience praised the selection of the movies as well as the curated panel discussions. Like the 1st edition, this edition was also curated by Ratnottama Sengupta and had multiple panel discussions and Q&A sessions with cast and crew of the films.

=== 1st Hyderabad Bengali Film Festival (HBFF), 2014 ===
The first edition of Hyderabad Bengali Film Festival (HBFF) was organized in 2014, from 18 July to 20 July. Over two and a half days, movies such as Apur Panchali, Jaatishwar, Nayan Chapar Dinratri, Take One, Phoring, Jodi Love Dile na Prane, Meghe Dhaka Tara & Rupkatha Noy were screened. Famous guests in attendance included national award-winning actress Rupa Gangooly (lead actress of movie Nayan Chapar Dinratri), Director Sekhar Das (director of movie Nayan Chapar Dinratri), Director duo Abhijit Guha and Sudeshna Roy (directors of movie Jodi Love Dile Na Prane, as well as movies like Teen Yaari Katha and Natobor Not Out) among others. Shows ran to full houses, the film fraternity as well as aficionados of the twin cities were all praise for the great initiative. The event concluded on 20 July, and was widely covered in media.

Bengalis in Hyderabad team has written, composed, sang and shot the theme song of the festival in-house, which was screened before every movie and was very well received by the audience. The festival was curated by Ratnottama Sengupta, an eminent film critic and movie journalist.

== See also ==
- Film Critics Circle of India
- Federation of Film Societies of India
