= Soukarya Ghosal =

Indian film director

Soukarya Ghosal সৌকর্য ঘোষাল
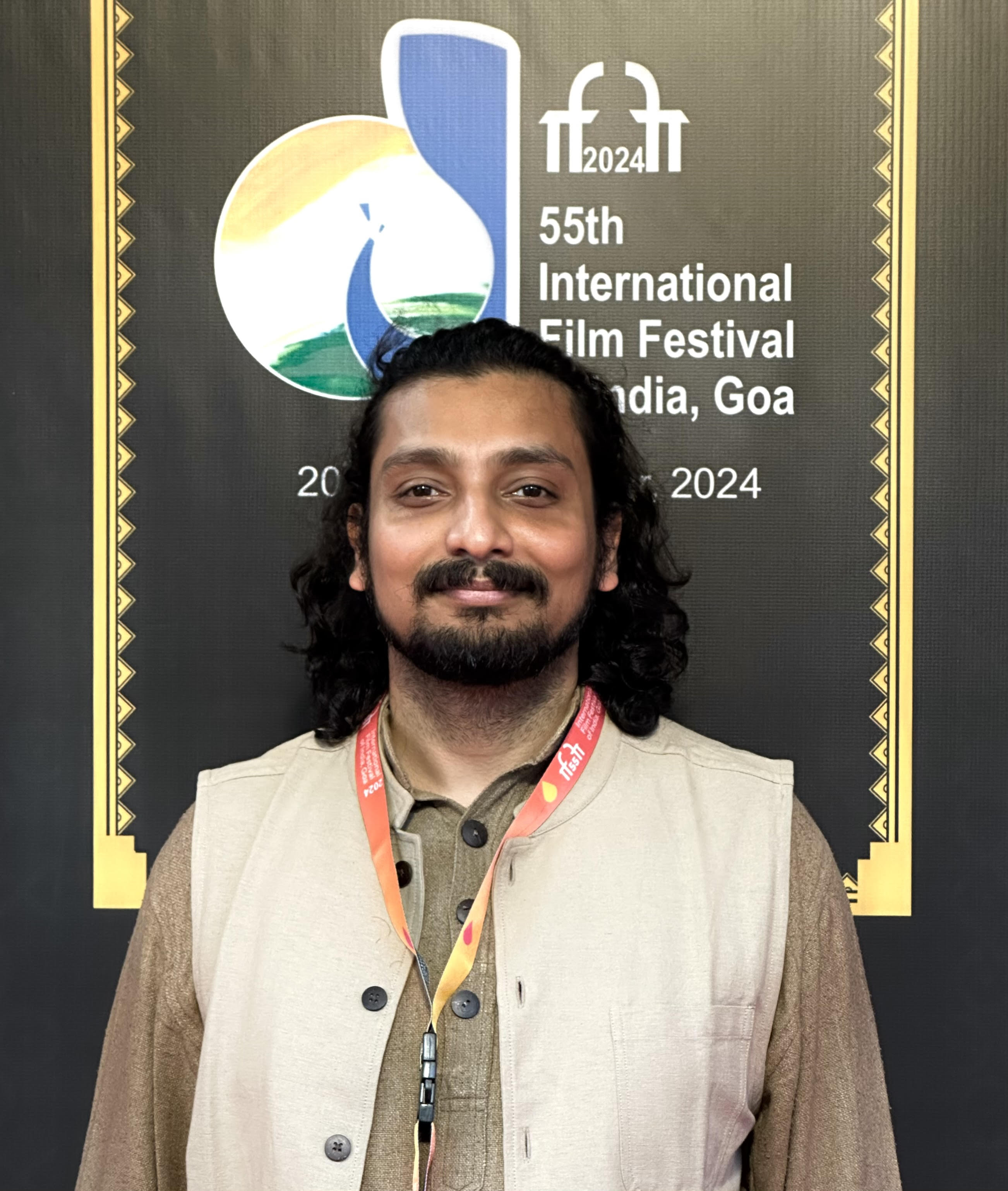
- Soukarya Ghosal at the 55th International Film Festival of India in 2024
- Born: 7 June 1986 (age 40); Kolkata, West Bengal, India
- Citizenship: Indian
- Education: University of Calcutta (BA)
- Occupations: Director; Producer; Screenwriter; Music Composer; Cartoonist; Animator
- Years active: 2014 -
- Known for: Rainbow Jelly; Bhootpori; Pokkhirajer Dim; OCD
- Spouse: Pooja Chatterjee

Soukarya Ghosal (Bengali: সৌকর্য ঘোষাল; born 7 June 1986) is an Indian filmmaker, director, screenwriter, illustrator and music composer. He is widely considered for his work in Rainbow Jelly, a food fantasy film for the children in Bengali Cinema. His film Bhootpori starring Jaya Ahsan, was an official selection for Indian Panorama at International Film Festival of India, Goa which also received the Best Screenplay award at 14 Dadasaheb Phalke Film Festival in 2024. The Pokkhirajer Dim was an official selection for Indian Panorama at the 56th International Film Festival of India in Goa 2025. Ghosal's latest film OCD (film) had its world premiere in the Indian Language Competition section at the 28th Kolkata International Film Festival in 2022 and theatrically released on 6 February 2026.

His first feature film Pendulum bagged three awards in the 4th Radio Mirchi Music Awards Bangla in 2014. Ghosal made his second film Load Shedding in 2015 which he wrote and directed for Zee Bangla Cinema Originals, was a teenage love story set in the 90's.

His film Rainbow Jelly, a food fantasy film about an autistic orphan received Hiralal Sen Award and Rituparno Ghosh Memorial Award for Most Promising Director from West Bengal Film Journalists' Association Awards. His upcoming film Kalantar.

== Early life ==
Ghosal was born and brought up in Kolkata. He attended A. K. Ghosh Memorial School and Jodhpur Park Boys School, and graduated in history from Asutosh College. He did a postgraduate course in Media Studies from University of Calcutta. His admiration for Satyajit Ray's illustrations in Sandesh magazine was a guiding force in his desire to become a professional illustrator.

== Career ==
In 2011, he joined Robbar the Sunday magazine of Sangbad Pratidin as a staff cartoonist and Illustrator. While working on comic series such as Tenida in Sandesh and Tenali Rama in Kishore Bharati, he felt a strong urge for sound and motion in his art. This led him to quit his job and pursue films. Coming directly from the field of art, Ghosal made his first film, Pendulum based on a surrealist painter who could physically take people into the space he drew. It took him a year to find a producer for the film.

=== 2014–2015 ===
On 7 March 2014, his debut film Pendulum, based on magic realism & time travel was released in West Bengal. This hyperlink film featured Radhika Apte, Rajesh Sharma, Sreelekha Mitra, Rajatabha Dutta, Subhasish Mukherjee, Shantilal Mukherjee, Samadarshi Dutta and Anindiya Banerjee, and was produced by Cozum Analytics Ltd.

In 2015, he made his second film, Load Shedding, for television. A teenage love story set in the 90s, it starred Riddhi Sen, Meghla Dasgupta, Bidipta Chakraborty, Saili Bhattacharya and Joydeep Kundu, and was produced by Nideas Creations.

=== 2016–2018 ===
In 2016, he adapted the story of Taranath Tantrik by Bibhutibhushan Bandyopadhyay to rewrite for a television series for Colors Bangla. Inspired by the literary world of Leela Majumdar in 2017, his film production company Indigenous produced Rainbow Jelly, a food fantasy in Bengali starring Mahabrata Basu, Anumegha Banerjee, Kaushik Sen, Sreelekha Mitra, Shantilal Mukherjee etc.. The film was based on an autistic orphan child who could control the human mind by cooking food with several tastes. The film depicted the gradual changes in the villain's mind and his seven different reactions as he encountered different kinds of tastes: sweet, sour, salty, spicy, pungent, astringent and bitter. Rainbow Jelly film got released in West Bengal on 25 May 2018 & got premiered in London & Bahrain. The film received Hiralal Sen award for best Bengali film of 2018 from FFSI (Federation of Film Societies of India). Ghosal received the Most Promising Director Award from West Bengal Film Journalists' Association Awards, for Rainbow Jelly.

In November 2018 Ghosal made emotional thriller Rawkto Rawhoshyo produced by Surinder Films starred Koel Mallick, Lily Chakravarty, Chandan Roy Sanyal, Rwitobroto Mukherjee, Shantilal Mukherjee, Basabdatta Chatterjee etc.

=== 2019–present ===
In August 2019 he made his fifth feature film Bhootpori a horror fantasy. This is a biography of a ghost who came into existence after the death of a Bengali widow in the eve of the Independence Day of India. The film starred Jaya Ahsan, Ritwick Chakraborty, Sudipta Chakraborty, Shantilal Mukherjee, Bishantak Mukherjee etc.

Rawkto Rawhoshyo was released in theatres on 21 October 2020 during Durga Puja. The film was initially scheduled to release on 10 April 2020, but was postponed due to the COVID-19 pandemic. Bhootpori was released on 9 February 2024 in West Bengal and was screened at the International Film Festival of India, Goa on 25 November 2024. His film Pokkhirajer Dim theatrically released on 13 June 2025 and was an official selection for Indian Panorama at the 56th International Film Festival of India in Goa 2025. Ghosal's latest film OCD (film) had its world premiere in the Indian Language Competition section at the 28th Kolkata International Film Festival in 2022 and theatrically released on 6 February 2026.

== Filmography ==
=== Films ===
†	Denotes Upcoming films

Film
Year	Title	Director	Writer	Story	Producer	Lyricist	Composer	Notes
2014	Pendulum	Yes	Yes	Yes		Yes		
2015	Load Shedding	Yes	Yes	Yes		Yes		
2018	Rainbow Jelly	Yes	Yes	Yes	Yes	Yes	Yes	Hiralal Sen Award for Best Bengali film WBFJA Awards for Most Promising Director (HBFF) award for Best Film (Jury) (HBFF) award for Best Screenplay (Jury) (HBFF) award for Best Film (Viewers' Choice); Nominated - WBFJA Awards for Best Film; Nominated - Film Critics Guild Award for Best Bengali Film
2020	Rawkto Rawhoshyo	Yes	Yes	Yes		Yes		
2024	Bhootpori	Yes	Yes	Yes				Best Screenplay award at 14 Dadasaheb Phalke Film Festival in 2024. Official selection for Indian Panorama at International Film Festival of India
2025	Pokkhirajer Dim	Yes	Yes	Yes		Yes	Yes	
2026	OCD	Yes	Yes	Yes	Yes			
2026	Kalantar	Yes	Yes	Yes	Yes			

== Awards and nominations ==
Award	Category	Nominee	Result	Year
Hyderabad Bengali Film Festival	Best Film (Jury Awards)	Rainbow Jelly	Won	2018
Hyderabad Bengali Film Festival	Best Screenplay (Jury Award)	Soukarya Ghosal	Won	2018
Hyderabad Bengali Film Festival	Best Film (Viewers' Choice Award)	Rainbow Jelly	Won	2018
Hiralal Sen Award	Best Bengali film of the year	Rainbow Jelly	Won	2019
WBFJA Awards	Most Promising Director	Soukarya Ghosal	Won	2019
WBFJA Awards	Best Film	Soukarya Ghosal	Nominated	2019
Film Critics Guild Award	Best Film (Bengali)	Rainbow Jelly	Nominated	2019
28th Kolkata International Film Festival	Indian Language Competition Section	OCD (film)	Official selection	2022
55th International Film Festival of India	Indian Panorama	Bhootpori	Official selection	2024
56th International Film Festival of India	Indian Panorama	Pokkhirajer Dim	Official selection	2025
