= Torulatar Bhoot =

2021 Bengali film

- Release poster
- Directed by: Deb Roy
- Written by: Deb Roy
- Cinematography: Joydeep Bose
- Music by: Anindya Chatterjee; Upal Sengupta
- Production company: Green Motion Pictures
- Release date: 24 September 2021
- Country: India
- Language: Bengali

Torulatar Bhoot (The ghost of Torulata) is a Bengali horror thriller film directed by Deb Roy, produced by Sarit Palchoudhury and Rabindranath Samanta. This film was released on 24 September 2021 under the banner of Green Motion Pictures. Music of the movie was composed by Upal Sengupta.

== Plot ==
A group of people visit a village for a picnic. They are members of a voluntary organisation, Prerana. They learn that, twenty years earlier, a young woman named Torulata was killed in a pond in the village. Since then, several teenagers have drowned and later died in the same pond. The villagers believe that Torulata’s ghost resides at the bottom of the pond and is responsible for the deaths of those teenagers. But what really happened?

== Cast ==
- Indraneil Sengupta as Viki Ghosh
- Ishaa Saha as Kamalkali
- Basabdatta Chatterjee as Monorama
- Pradip Mukherjee as Purohit Ghoshal
- Dipanwita Hazari as Bardi
- Rahul Dev Bose as Sayan
- Sumit Samaddar
- Prasanta Sutradhar
- Kripa Bindu
- Prosun Saha
