= Bhootpori =

2024 Bengali-language film by Soukarya Ghosal

- Directed by: Soukarya Ghosal
- Screenplay by: Soukarya Ghosal
- Story by: Soukarya Ghosal
- Produced by: Nispal Singh; Surinder Films
- Starring: Jaya Ahsan; Ritwick Chakraborty; Shantilal Mukherjee; Sudipta Chakraborty; Bishantak Mukherjee
- Cinematography: Aalok Maity
- Edited by: Arghyakamal Mitra
- Music by: Nabarun Bose
- Distributed by: Surinder Films
- Release date: 9 February 2024 (Kolkata)
- Running time: 110 minute
- Country: India
- Language: Bengali

Bhootpori is a 2024 Indian Bengali-language fantasy horror film written and directed by Soukarya Ghosal, starring Jaya Ahsan, Ritwick Chakraborty, Shantilal Mukherjee, Sudipta Chakraborty and introducing Bishantak Mukherjee. The story revolves around a lonely ghost who is waiting for her emancipation with a belief that humans become ghosts to transform into fairies.

Bhootpori is based on the idea of reincarnation which is very much celebrated in Indian popular culture and spiritual texts. The film depicts death not as an end of a life cycle but an intermediate stage of becoming an angel from the mortal of human life. The film was an official selection for Indian Panorama at the 55th International Film Festival of India in Goa 2024.

== Plot ==
The story is based on the life and afterlife of Bonolata, who was killed by a priest before she could turn into Bhootpori. During her mortal life, Bonolata accidentally discovers the secret of child sacrifice, which Kalothakur, the priest, had been performing in her village for quite some time. Before she can unravel the dark truth, she is murdered to keep the secret intact.

As Bonolata was attacked from behind, she is unable to recognise her murderer. Soon after dying, she dreams that she is levitating like a light feather, but suddenly awakens as a ghost, leaving the dream unfinished. From then on, she remains sad and lonely in the world of death until a little boy named Shurjo comes to help her after seventy springs. During their first encounter, both the ghost and the boy become intrigued and suspicious of one another, as they are able to see, feel, and touch each other like normal human beings, which should not have been possible.

Incidentally, Shurjo is also the great-grandson of Kalothakur. He suffers from somnambulism and is brought to the village, away from the bustle of the city, by his parents for a change of air. After learning about Bonolata's unfinished dream, he reveals that he repeatedly sees the same dream that Bonolata saw when she fell asleep. Bonolata also informs Shurjo that only if she can sleep again and see the dream to its conclusion will she turn into an angel, freed from the bonds of the mundane world of death. In the course of uncovering the mystery of the village and Kalothakur, Shurjo meets a village thief named Makhon, who tells him about a secret underground room that contains all the answers. According to Makhon, his ancestor had entered the room and copied down writings in a language no one could understand.

Noru Thakur, the disciple of Kalothakur, comes to meet Shurjo's mother, Shilalipi. He tells her the story of Bonolata and how he encountered her ghost after her death, during which an accident left his face burned, a scar he still carries to this day. Upon hearing of the incident, his master stopped the child sacrifices and committed suicide. He warns Shilalipi that Bonolata can attain enlightenment only after killing a descendant of Kalothakur, and that she is now after her son. Hearing this from his hiding place, where he had been concealed with Bonolata, Shurjo looks at her with betrayal and runs away.

He eventually finds the room Makhon had told him about and realises that the strange writings are neither letters nor secret codes, but are formed by the shadows of a strange wire-shaped three-dimensional object in the middle of the room. Every time he turns it so that the shadow matches one of the letters, the voices of children sing the notes of sargam. The strange symbols are revealed to be the notes of a song that can help ghosts sleep.

He leaves the room but collapses with a fever. Makhon finds him and leaves him on the porch of his house. His mother becomes worried and calls for a doctor. Once the doctor examines him and everyone leaves him to rest, Makhon emerges from under the bed. Shurjo tells him everything he saw and begins decoding the song.

That night, Bonolata apparates into Shurjo's room, but instead of harming him, she merely locks the door, contrary to what the film initially leads the audience to believe. She then targets his mother. The story then shifts into Shurjo's dream, where he sees Bonolata on a boat while he plays the violin, and Bonolata drifts away into the sky. After finishing the song, Shurjo immediately rushes to help his mother, having seen in his dream that she was sleepwalking.

After this, Shurjo returns to the place where he first met Bonolata and mourns her. His family is preparing to return to Kolkata. Makhon comes to bid him farewell and, proud of what Shurjo has achieved, gifts him the book his ancestor had left behind — a gift from a thief to the son of a rich man.

While returning home, a golden feather falls onto Shurjo's hand, signifying that Bonolata has become Bhootpori.

== Cast ==
- Jaya Ahsan as Bonolata
- Bishantak Mukherjee as Shurjo
- Ritwick Chakraborty as Makhon Chor
- Shantilal Mukherjee as Kalothakur
- Sudipta Chakraborty as Shilalipi
- Kalyan Chatterjee as Noru Thakur
- Abhijit Guha as Master
- Udayshankar Pal Banowari
- Rajdeep Ghosh as Gyan Moyra

== Soundtrack ==
Bhootpori

Soundtrack album by Ramprasad Sen, Nabarun Bose, Rajarshi Burman
- Released: 2024
- Genre: Feature film soundtrack
- Length: 6:30
- Language: Bengali
- Label: Surinder Films

The Music of the film is composed by Nabarun Bose. The sound design and mixing are done by Anindit Roy and Adeep Singh Manki. The film has one song originally written and composed by Sri Ramprasad Sen. Nabarun Bose rearranged and programmed the song which is sung by Rajarshi Burman in the film. The soundtrack was released by Surinder Films.

No.	Title	Writer(s)	Singer(s)	Length
1.	"Mayer Emni Bichar Bote"	Ramprasad Sen	Rajarshi Burman	6:30
Total length:				6:30

== Reception ==
The film was released on 9 February 2024 in India and received positive critical reviews. The Times of India gives 3.5 Critics rating out of 5. Bhootpori ran for uninterrupted 75 days in theatres.

The film was an official selection for Indian Panorama at the 55th International Film Festival of India, Goa 2024 where it was screened at Inox Panaji, Old GMC building on 25 November 2024.
