= Madras Film Society =

- Formation: 1957
- Founder: Ammu Swaminathan
- Purpose: Film Society
- Location: K.R.Koil Street, West Mambalam, Chennai.

The Madras Film Society (MFS) was founded by Ammu Swaminathan in 1957 to screen various films from all over the world. In early 80's screening of international films, conducting film appreciation courses, meeting up with film makers, screening retrospective of masters and anniversary film festival.
