= Chotushkone =

2014 Indian Bengali film by Srijit Mukherji

- Theatrical release poster
- Bengali: চতুষ্কোণ
- Directed by: Srijit Mukherji
- Written by: Srijit Mukherji
- Produced by: Reliance Entertainment; Dag Creative Media
- Starring: Aparna Sen; Chiranjeet Chakraborty; Goutam Ghose; Parambrata Chatterjee; Payel Sarkar; Rahul; Indrasish Roy
- Cinematography: Sudeep Chatterjee
- Edited by: Rabiranjan Maitra
- Music by: Anupam Roy
- Production company: Reliance Entertainment
- Distributed by: Reliance Entertainment
- Release date: 26 September 2014
- Running time: 148 minutes
- Country: India
- Language: Bengali

Chotushkone (Bengali: চতুষ্কোণ; English: Quadrangle) is an Indian Bengali thriller drama film directed by Srijit Mukherji, starring Aparna Sen, Goutam Ghose, Chiranjeet Chakraborty, Parambrata Chatterjee and Payel Sarkar. The film received positive reviews from critics and audience alike and is considered to be one of the finest films of Mukherji. Srijit Mukherji won the National Film Award for Best Direction at India's 62nd National Film Awards. The climax reportedly had some loose similarities with the climax of Agatha Christie's And Then There Were None. It was declared a "clean hit" in box office.

== Plot ==
The film's primary story follows four film directors:

- Trina Sen: A veteran director and former actress who is now married.
- Sakyo: A serious, acclaimed art-house filmmaker.
- Dipto: A once-prominent director who has fallen on hard times and now makes commercial films.
- Joyobroto: A young, effeminate aspiring filmmaker who brings the others together.

Joy is approached by an anonymous producer, Mr. Gupta, who wants to finance a film consisting of four short stories, with each director contributing one. The only condition is that all four stories must be centered on the theme of "death." Joy takes on the difficult task of convincing the three seasoned directors, who have a shared and troubled history. It is revealed that Trina, Dipto, and Sakyo were once entangled in a love triangle. Trina and Dipto were lovers, with Sakyo secretly in love with Trina. This creates an awkward and tense dynamic as they agree to collaborate.

The four set out on a road trip to the producer's secluded bungalow to present their scripts. Along the way, their car breaks down, forcing them to take refuge in another of the producer's properties. As they are stranded, the directors narrate their individual short film ideas to each other.

- Sakyo's story is about a television writer named Animesh who specializes in killing off characters in his serials. He is haunted by the ghosts of the characters he has "killed," who come back to take revenge on him.
- Dipto's story is a black comedy about a man named Bedoshruti Dey with a severe nicotine addiction who will do anything to get a cigarette. He is driven to desperate acts that ultimately lead to his own demise.
- Trina's story is a supernatural tale about a woman named Madhura who can communicate with the dead. She performs a "reverse planchette," summoning the spirits of the living to a seance.

Woven throughout the film in black and white is a second, seemingly unrelated plotline. This story, set in the 1970s, follows three young, aspiring filmmakers and friends: Nilanjana, Ritwick, and Amitava. Their dynamic mirrors that of the modern-day directors: a love triangle and professional rivalries. This black-and-white thread is often spliced into the main narrative at key moments, creating an aura of mystery. It is not immediately clear how this past story connects to the present.

As the four directors conclude their stories, Joy reveals his own script. He tells the story of an older half-brother and his wife who were betrayed by three of their closest friends and collaborators — a love triangle involving a leading actress and two directors. This betrayal led to the elder half-brother's film being abandoned and his wife's suicide, which drove him to a mental asylum.

As Joy narrates, the pieces of the puzzle begin to fall into place. The black-and-white flashbacks reveal that Nilanjana, Ritwick, and Amitava are none other than the younger versions of Trina, Dipto, and Sakyo. The older half-brother in Joy's story is the "producer," Mr. Gupta, who lost his mind because of their actions. Joy is his younger half-brother (whom Gupta raised like his son), who has orchestrated the entire film project as an elaborate act of revenge.

Joy's final act is to turn his narrative into a real-life horror film. He pulls out a gun and forces the three directors to participate in a game of Russian roulette. However, in a final, tragic twist, the gun misfires and kills Joy himself. The film ends with Trina and Dipto visiting the asylum, where a catatonic Mr. Gupta (the producer) does not recognize them. The audience is left to ponder the cyclical nature of revenge and how the sins of the past inevitably come back to haunt the present.

== Cast ==
- Aparna Sen as Trina Sen/Madhura (double role)
- Chiranjeet Chakraborty as Dipto/Bedoshruti Dey (double role)
- Goutam Ghose as Sakyo/Animesh (double role)
- Parambrata Chatterjee as Joyobroto, alias Joy
- Kaushik Ganguly as Mr. Gupta, a film producer
- Anindya Chatterjee as Tatha
- Koneenica Banerjee as Mimi
- Barun Chanda as Moloy Sen, Trina's husband
- Biswajit Chakraborty as a furniture dealer
- Biswarup Biswas as Sanjoy
- Dilip Sarkar as Manas
- Payel Sarkar as Nilanjana/Young Trina
- Indrasish Roy as Ritwick/Young Dipto
- Rahul Banerjee as Amitava/Young Sakya
- Manasi Sinha as Madhabi
- Raajhorshee De as Film Maker
- Debolina Dutta as Sonia
- Sumit Samaddar as Badal
- Sujan Mukhyopadhyay as Rajkumar Mukherjee
- Arpita Pal as Jyotsna Mukherjee
- Shantilal Mukherjee as Police Officer
- Ritabhari Chakraborty as Nandita
- Akshay Kapoor as Samaresh
- Sumit Roy as Abhijit

== Awards ==
=== 62nd National Film Awards ===
- Best Direction - Srijit Mukherji
- Best Original Screenplay - Srijit Mukherji
- Best Cinematography - Sudeep Chatterjee

== Music ==
The music of the film has been composed by Anupam Roy. He himself has penned the lyrics (apart from one Rabindra Sangeet i.e. Chirosakha He). The Background Music is composed by Indraadip Dasgupta

#	Title	Singer(s)
1	"Basanto Eshe Geche (Male)"	Anupam Roy
2	"Mone Porar Gaan"	Somlata Acharyya Chowdhury
3	"Boba Tunnel"	Anupam Roy
4	"Basanto Eshe Geche (Female)"	Lagnajita Chakraborty
5	"Chirosakha He"	Srikanto Acharya
6	"Shetai Satyi"	Rupankar Bagchi
