= List of Indian Bengali films of 2027 =

This is a list of Indian Bengali cinema films scheduled to be released in 2027.

== January–March ==
Opening		Title	Director	Cast	Production Company	Ref.
J A N	TBA	Bhoyongkar Shundor	Chandrasis Roy	Prosenjit Chatterjee; Aryann Bhowmik	Shree Venkatesh Films, Nideas Creations	

== October–December ==
Untitled film-8 Oct 2027 Release-Starring Jeet
