= Rawkto Rawhoshyo =

2020 Indian Bengali thriller film

- Release official poster
- Directed by: Soukarya Ghosal
- Written by: Soukarya Ghosal
- Starring: Koel Mallick; Lily Chakravarty; Rwitobroto Mukherjee; Chandan Roy Sanyal
- Cinematography: Aalok Maiti
- Edited by: Arghyakamal Mitra
- Music by: Nabarun Bose; Debdeep Mukherjee
- Production company: Surinder Films
- Distributed by: Surinder Films
- Release date: 21 October 2020
- Country: India
- Language: Bengali

Rawkto Rawhoshyo is a 2020 Indian Bengali-language investigative neo-noir action thriller film written and directed by Soukarya Ghosal. The film is produced by Surinder Films, and stars Koel Mallick with a supporting cast of Lily Chakravarty, Rwitobroto Mukherjee and Chandan Roy Sanyal in pivotal roles.

The film was released in theatres on 21 October 2020 during Durga Puja. The film was initially scheduled to release on 10 April 2020, but was postponed due to the COVID-19 pandemic. The film received mostly positive reviews, with praise directed towards the performances and the exploration of a unique subject.

== Plot ==
Swarnaja is a hard-working and good-natured radio jockey in Kolkata, who has extremely rare Rh-null blood, often known as 'golden blood'. She has been brought up by her grandmother after her mother's suicide. The duo live with their domestic help and her son Babai, who has a sibling-like bond with Swarnaja. At a yoga session she attends on family physician Dr Burman's advice, Swarnaja meets Shammo Sengupta, who claims to be heir to a gemstone business. The two grow close and Swarnaja develops feelings for him. However, she soon discovers that Shammo is actually married and had kept this fact from her, making her end the relationship. Some time later, Swarnaja is surprised to get a call from Shammo's wife, Kheya, who implores her for a meeting. As Swarnaja and Babai go to meet her at a coffee shop, they learn that Kheya needs a wheelchair after fracturing her pelvis in an accident. Kheya reveals that she is not averse to Swarnaja and Shammo's relationship. The two women eventually become close, if unusual, friends, though Swarnaja maintains her distance from Shammo. One day, knowing that she can never become a mother, Kheya attempts suicide. Swarnaja decides to help her friend by choosing to carry the couple's baby as a surrogate mother, though her grandmother and Dr Burman strongly advise against it. She becomes very attached to the newborn, whom she dubs 'Ghenturam'. On the day that Shammo and Kheya were to take the boy away with them, Swarnaja wakes up to find both the child and the couple missing. When she calls Shammo, he claims that they left before anyone woke up because they did not want to trouble them. A day later, news of Dr Burman's unnatural death reaches the family. Swarnaja tries to cope with the twin disappointment by immersing herself in her work.

Five years later, Swarnaja and her family is watching the news on TV, when the death of a woman named Ankita Sen is broadcast. The news mentions the woman as being part of a child trafficking racket. The family, to their disbelief, recognise the photo of the deceased woman as that of Kheya. Swarnaja and Babai rush to register a complaint with the police, where the SHO takes up their case. Investigations reveal that 'Shammo' and 'Kheya' were the tricksters' aliases; all documents that they had used were forged, and the police suspect them to be part of an international gang which obtains children through surrogacy (as opposed to kidnapping, which will attract police investigation), and sells them for clinical trials. Meanwhile, a masked man enters Swarnaja's home at night and tries to give her an injection; he is stopped by Babai, who gets injected in the process and falls unconscious, only noticing a distinctive tattoo on the man's hand. Using clues provided by Swarnaja, police manage to learn that Kheya's real name is Rabeya Khatun, and locate her home in Raiganj. Rabeya's mother reveals that Samyo actually was Rabeya's husband, that his real name is Sushil, and other crucial information. Swarnaja also remembers where she had seen a tattoo matching Babai's description - on the instructor's hand at the yoga session where she met Samyo. As police nab and question the instructor, Swarnaja and Babai learn that he worked for Dr Burman; he and the doctor used to collect and illegally sell Swarnaja's extremely rare blood. Sushil/Samyo had made contact with them to lure Swarnaja into their scheme, blackmailing the doctor into agreement. The instructor reveals that the child is alive and has the same rare blood type as Swarnaja, and that Sushil has not managed to get hold of him yet.

Swarnaja asks the police to look for the child's records in blood bank registers. They find out the address of an orphanage, but Sushil has already taken the boy, now named Porag, away by posing as a parent seeking to adopt him. Meanwhile, police manage to arrest one of Sushil's accomplices, an actress who posed as his wife at the orphanage, by tracking parcels of special homoeopathic medicines that Sushil used. This helps the police, Swarnaja and Babai to corner Sushil and another accomplice at a construction site. In the ensuing chase, the culprits are arrested, but Babai falls to his death trying to help Porag. Porag is injured too, but recovers later. Swarnaja grieves over Babai's death, and some time later visits the orphanage to request custody of Porag. The orphanage in-charge reveals that it was Dr Burman who had handed the then-infant Porag to her, told her about the child's rare blood type, and begged her to keep all of this a secret. The orphanage, though, had to get in touch with the blood bank after Porag once got badly injured while playing. After initial hesitation, Porag agrees to go with Swarnaja, who embraces him as her son.

== Cast ==
- Koel Mallick as Swarnaja
- Chandan Roy Sanyal as Shammo Sengupta/Sushil
- Lily Chakravarty as 'Dimma', Swarnaja's maternal grandmother
- Rwitobroto Mukherjee as Babai
- Shantilal Mukherjee as Dr Burman
- Basabdatta Chatterjee as Kheya Sengupta/Ankita Sen/Rabeya Khatun
- Joyraj Bhattacharjee as SHO of local police station
- Kanchana Moitra as domestic help and Babai's mother
- Ujjwal Malakar as yoga instructor
- Subhra Sourav Das as Sushil's accomplice
- Shreeansh Sarkar as Porag

Special appearance

- Mir Afsar Ali
- Mirchi Agni
- Mirchi Somak
- Rini Biswas

== Soundtrack ==
Rawkto Rawhoshyo

Soundtrack album by Nabarun Bose, Debdeep Mukhopadhyay
- Recorded: 2020
- Studio: Aural Workstation
- Genre: Feature film soundtrack
- Language: Bengali
- Label: Surinder Films

The soundtrack of the film is composed by Nabarun Bose and Debdeep Mukherjee, on lyrics of Soukarya Ghosal and Debdeep Mukherjee.

Track listing
No.	Title	Lyrics	Music	Singer(s)	Length
1.	"Mon Phur Phur"	Soukarya Ghosal	Nabarun Bose	Prashmita Paul	2:30
2.	"Amar Ektarata"	Debdeep Mukhopadhyay	Debdeep Mukhopadhyay	Lagnajita Chakraborty	2:51
3.	"Behaya Batashey"	Debdeep Mukhopadhyay	Debdeep Mukhopadhyay	Anupam Roy	2:35
4.	"Kawthar Kawtha"	Soukarya Ghosal	Nabarun Bose	Iman Chakraborty	2:57

== Reception ==
Rawkto Rawhosyo received mostly positive reviews from critics. The Times of India called it a "thoroughly enjoyable thriller" with a "riveting story", but also found the second half "hasty". Cinestaan noted how the film celebrates femininity and has "some fresh ideas", but called it "a strictly one-time watch". A review in The Citizen found it "an intriguing thriller" and also a "tribute to a single mother". Anandabazar Patrika noted the film coming close on the heels of Mallick herself becoming a mother, and compared the film's theme of maternal love to the Aishwarya Rai-starrer Jazbaa. It praised the chemistry between Mallick and Rwitobroto Mukherjee, but felt that the slow buildup and suspense of the first half was wasted in the second.
