= Tiki-Taka (film) =

2020 Indian sports drama comedy film

- Film poster
- Directed by: Parambrata Chattopadhyay
- Written by: Rohan Ghose; Shouvik Banerjee
- Produced by: Shouvik Basu; Navratan Jhawar; Raylin Valles
- Starring: Emona Enabulu; Parambrata Chattopadhyay; Ritabhari Chakraborty
- Cinematography: Ravi Kiran Ayyagari
- Edited by: Sumit Chowdhary
- Music by: Nabarun Bose
- Production companies: Ratanshree Nirman; Ten Films; Roadshow Films
- Distributed by: ZEE5
- Release date: 11 September 2020
- Running time: 104 minutes
- Country: India
- Language: Bengali

Tiki-Taka, previously titled as Khelechi Ajgubi, is a 2020 Indian ZEE5 original Bengali language sports drama situational comedy film directed and produced by Parambrata Chattopadhyay. The film stars African national Emona Enabulu in the lead role while director Parambrata Chattopadhyay, Ritabhari Chakraborty and Saswata Chatterjee play supporting roles in the film. The film was set against the backdrop of West Bengal and other parts of North-East India. The film was premiered via ZEE5 on 11 September 2020 and opened to positive reviews.

== Plot ==
The storyline of the film revolves around the Senegalese national Khelechi Ajgubi (Emona Enabulu) who has landed in India to fulfill his aspirations of pursuing his career as a professional footballer before getting trapped in a comedy of errors.

== Cast ==
- Emona Enabulu as Kelechi Ajgubi
- Parambrata Chattopadhyay as Raju, taxi-driver
- Ritabhari Chakraborty as Bonny
- Saswata Chatterjee as PK
- Bruno Venchuro
- Kharaj Mukherjee
- Surangana Bandyopadhyay as special appearance
- Riddhi Sen as special appearance

== Production ==
The film production originally launched in Bengali language and the film was initially tentatively titled as Khelechi Ajgubi. The principal photography of the film began in March 2018, keeping in mind about the 2018 FIFA World Cup. The directorial venture was announced by actor Parambrata Chattopadhyay who also made his debut as a producer through this project. The film title was later changed to Tiki-Taka which is a technique popularly used in the sport of football. The film was dubbed in Hindi during the COVID-19 pandemic lockdown in India. Senegalese actor Emona Enabulu was roped into play the male lead role. The portions of the film were predominantly shot in Kolkata.

== Release ==
The film was supposed to have its theatrical release in 2020 but was called off due to the COVID-19 pandemic in India and filmmakers intended to release it via OTT platform. ZEE5 bought the digital distribution rights of the film and was released on the platform on 11 September 2020.

== Reception ==
After release, Tiki Taka received positive reviews from critics, with praises for the plot, light-hearted comedy and individual performances.

Upam Buzarbaruah of Times Of India wrote "Tiki Taka is a nice watch. It boasts of some decent performances. While Parambrata and Emona rule the screen with their chemistry, Ritabhari also delivers her role quite nicely. The rest of the cast, however, have too short a screen presence for us to judge their performances"
