= Basabdatta Chatterjee =

Bengali actress

- Born: 6 May 1989 (age 37); Kolkata, West Bengal, India
- Education: Lee Memorial Girls High School, Brahmo Girls' School, Gokhale Memorial Girls' College (graduation), Rabindra Bharati University (Masters)
- Occupations: Acting, Modeling
- Known for: Acting in the popular Bengali comedy soap Boyei Gelo and the Bengali film Asha Jaoar Majhe
- Spouse: Anirban Biswas (m. 2018)

Basabdatta Chatterjee (born 6 May 1989) is an Indian Bengali television and film actress. She made her debut with Gaaner Oparey directed by Rituparno Ghosh. She rose to fame after playing the female lead in the comedy soap Boyei Gelo, which aired on Zee Bangla. Boyei Gelo was Basabdatta's seventh work. Subsequently, she worked in another daily soap Mon Niye Kachakachi on Star Jalsha. In 2019, she played Subash Chandra Bose's mother Prabhavati Devi on Zee Bangla's daily soap Netaji.

Chatterjee's debut film was Asha Jaoar Majhe (2014) directed by Aditya Vikram Sengupta. She starred as the female lead alongside Ritwick Chakraborty. She was selected by the director after he found her impressive performance in her first serial Ganer Opaarey. At the 62nd National Film Awards (2015), it won the Best Debut Film of a Director and Best Audiography awards. It was screened at the 11th Venice Days Film Festival and many other festivals.

== Early life and education ==
Basabdatta was born in Kolkata in West Bengal. She passed Madhyamik from Lee Memorial Girls High School, Higher Secondary from Brahmo Balika Shikshalaya and graduated from Gokhale Memorial Girls' College. In 2013, she completed her master's degree in Bengali from Rabindra Bharati University.

== Career ==
Basabdatta's father, Sumantra Chatterjee, was a film reviewer. So initially, she wanted to become a reporter. She had basically no plans for entering the glamour world. But she came to limelight when she made her debut in the soap Ganer Opaarey, directed by Rituparno Ghosh. She is also a model for several jewellery and clothing brands. Basabdatta is equally popular in both West Bengal and Bangladesh.

=== Television ===
Basabdatta has appeared in several television serials, including Gaaner Oparey, Boyei Gelo and Mon Niye Kachakachi. She has also appeared in the television game show Dadagiri Unlimited on Zee Bangla and Ebar Jalsha Rannaghore on Star Jalsha. She also took the role as Sati in the television event Durga Durgotinashini.

== Personal life ==
On 6 March 2018 she was married to journalist Anirban Biswas. In June 2022, she gave birth to a daughter.

== Filmography ==
=== TV series ===
Year	Title	Role	Director	Broadcasting channel
2010 - 2011	Ganer Opaarey		Rituparno Ghosh	Star Jalsha
2011	Ek Mutho Asha	Sanchita		Mahuaa Bangla
2011	Ami Sei Meye			Sananda TV
2011 - 2012	Amar Naam Joyita	Joyita		Sananda TV
2013	Ashar Alo	Chandana		ETV Bangla
2013–2014	Boyei Gelo (later replaced by Madhubani Ghosh Gowswami)	Krishna Sengupta	Swarnendu Samaddar	Zee Bangla
2015	Mon Niye Kachakachi	Dr. Labanya Sanyal	Abira Majumdar	Star Jalsha
2016	Goyenda Ginni	Tridha Banerjee	Anupam, Rajat Paul	Zee Bangla
2016	Taranath Tantrik	Jahnobi	Bijoy Jana	Colors Bangla
2019–2020	Netaji	Prabhabati Bose (Dutt)	Amit Das, Sibhangshu Dasgupta	Zee Bangla
2020	Prothoma Kadambini	Jnanadanandini Devi	Swarnendu Samaddar, Shamik Bose	Star Jalsha
2023–2024	Kar Kachhe Koi Moner Kotha	Sucharita Basu	Leena Gangopadhyay	Zee Bangla
2025	SIT Bengal	Madhumita Basak	Rakesh Basu	Zee Bangla

=== Awards ===
Year	Award	Category	Character	Film/TV show
2015	Telly Academy Award 2015	Best Actress	Labanya	Mon Niye Kachakachi
2019	Hyderabad Bengali Film Festival	Best Actress Jury	Mou	Tokhon Kuasa Chilo
2020	Zee Bangla Sonar Sansar Award 2020	Priyo Maa	Prabhabati Bose	Netaji

=== Mahalaya ===
Year	Title	Role	Broadcasting channel
2013	Jago Dosoprohoronodharini	Devi Gouri	Zee Bangla
2014	Durga Durgotinashini	Devi Sati	Star Jalsha
2019	12 Mashe 12 Rupe Debibaran	Devi Basanti	Zee Bangla

=== Films ===
Year	Title	Role	Note
2014	Asha Jaoar Majhe	The woman	
2019	Weekend E Surjoday	Basudha	
2020	Michhil	Sreemoyi	
2020	Sraboner Dhara	Pritha Roy	
2020	Rawkto Rawhoshyo	Kheya	
2021	Sohorer Upokotha	Moumita	
2021	Torulatar Bhoot	Monorama	
2021	Tokhon Kuasa Chilo	Mou	
2022	Abhijaan	Deepa Chatterjee	
