= Shantilal Mukherjee =

Indian Bengali actor

- Born: July 7, 1962 (age 64); Kolkata, India
- Occupation: Actor
- Children: Rwitobroto Mukherjee

Shantilal Mukherjee is an Indian actor associated with Bengali-language theatre and films.

== Biography ==
He first emerged as a child artist and later became a leading character in many films.Mukherjee was born in Kolkata. He lost his father in an early age. He was admitted in Sarsuna High School from where he passed Madhyamik examination. He passed Higher Secondary Examination from New Alipore Multipurpose High School. He graduated from the Asutosh College, a University of Calcutta affiliate.

Mukherjee is mainly knowns as a stage actor. Ramaprasad Banik and Chandan Sen taught him acting.He is currently the General Secretary of "West Bengal Motion Picture Artists' Forum" since 2022. His son is Rwitobroto Mukherjee who is also an actor, working primarily in films, web series and stage.

== Filmography ==
- Bandhan (2004) as Priyo Da, Rohit's friend
- Badsha the King (2004) as Kartik, Shaktinath's PA
- Antarmahal (2005) voice actor
- Shikar (2006)
- MLA Fatakeshto (2006) as Haridas, Ranodeb Pal's PA
- Anuranan (2006)
- Kaalbela (2009)
- Chaowa Pawa (2009)
- Kaler Rakhal (2009)
- Moner Manush (2010)
- Kahaani (2012) as R. Shridhar
- Macho Mustanaa (2012)
- Le Halua Le (2012) as Police Inspector
- Kidnapper (2013)
- Chhayamoy (2013)
- Kanamachi (2013)
- Kangal Malsat (2013)
- Baari Tar Bangla(2014)
- Chirodini Tumi Je Amar 2 (2014) as Owner of Chanachur Factory
- The Royal Bengal Tiger (2014) as Deepankar
- Pendulum (2014)
- Buno Haansh (2014) as Rafik
- Chotushkone (2014) as Police Officer
- Yoddha: The Warrior (2014)
- Guddu Ki Gun (2015) as Anand "Antique Moshai" Mukhopadhyay
- Byomkesh Bakshi (2015)
- Jamai 420 (2015) as Potla Poda
- Byomkesh O Chiriyakhana (2016)
- Power (2016) as Hari
- M.S. Dhoni: The Untold Story (2016) as Sarkar
- Amar Aponjon (2017) as Joydip's father
- Chalbaaz (2018) as Pappu Mallick
- Pari (2018) as Police Inspector
- Bhaijaan Elo Re (2018) as Sudhir Mukherjee
- Goyenda Tatar (2018) as Abbas
- Kaali (2018)
- Jamai Badal (2019) as Pronam Pal
- Bhootchakra Pvt. Ltd. (2019)
- India's Most Wanted (2019) as Shaumik Biswas
- Goyenda Junior (2019) as Sanjay
- Panther (2019) as Jahangir/Firoz Khan
- Mukhosh (2020) as Sabyasachi Banerjee
- Rawkto Rawhoshyo (2020) as Dr. Burman
- SOS Kolkata (2020) as Matthew Henriques, Retired Army General
- Michhil (2020)
- Tiki-Taka (2020)
- Miss Call (2021) as OC Sadananda Sen
- F.I.R No. 339/07/06 (2021) as Bhagirath Mishra
- Ogo Bideshini (2022)
- Kurban (2023)
- Bhootpori (2024) as Kalo Thakur
- Mirza (2024)
- @Followers (2025)
- Madam Sengupta (2025)
- Dispersion (Upcoming)
- Rappa Roy & Full Stop Dot Com (upcoming)
- Nibba Nibbi (2026)
- Beporoya (2026)

=== Radio ===
- In 2022, Radio Mirchi Kolkata aired Sunil Gangopadhyay's Kakababu adventure story Bhoyonkor Sundor. The character of Kakababu was voiced by Mukherjee while RJ Agni voiced the character of Santu.

== Awards ==
- 2021: Films and Frames Digital Film Awards - Best Performance in A Negative Role for FIR

== See also ==
- Kaushik Sen
