= Federation of Film Societies of India =

Federation of Film Societies of India (FFSI) is the umbrella body of film-screening societies in India. FFSI is currently a member of the International Federation of Film Society that has its organisation is an associate member of UNESCO.

== History ==
FFSI was established on 13 December 1959 with its Registered and Central Offices in Calcutta (now Kolkata) by the coming together of a group of officials representing six existing film societies in the country, namely Calcutta Film Society, Delhi Film Society, Madras Film Society, Patna Film Society, Bombay Film Society and Roorkee Film Society. The moving spirit behind the concept was the eminent film director-writer-music composer-screenplay writer-graphic artist-type font designer-short story writer Satyajit Ray who along with his colleagues from the Bengali language film industry came together to join hands to bring international cinema and Indian regional film efforts before a generation of young audiences who were until then provided only with commercial Indian cinema fare. The first executive committee of this federation comprised Satyajit Ray as president, three vice-presidents, namely Ms Ammu Swaminathan (Madras), Robert Hawkins (Bombay), S. Gopalan (Delhi), two joint secretaries, Ms Vijaya Mulay (Delhi) and Chidananda Dasgupta (Calcutta), Diptendu Pramanick and Abul Hasan as joint treasurers, and members R Anantharaman, K L Khandpur, Jag Mohan, A Rehman, A Roychowdhury and Ms. Rita Ray.

Two former prime ministers of India, Mrs Indira Gandhi and Mr Inder Kumar Gujral held office in FFSI during its formative years. Elsewhere, FFSI members included internationally and nationally acclaimed members of the Indian film industry and from the field of letters and included persons like Mrinal Sen, Ritwik Ghatak, H K Sanyal, Subrata Mitra, Harisadhan Dasgupta, Nimai Ghosh, Anil Chatterjee, Mrs Aruna Asif Ali, Shyam Benegal et al.

At the end of year 2014, FFSI had 321 regular film societies on its membership rolls and about 100 campus film societies with a concentration of 118 film societies clustered within the south Indian state of Kerala.

FFSI has focused its activities on the promotion of good cinema, worked to acquire feature and short films to feed its member units for screenings, and associate itself with both national and international organisations undertaking similar work.

The creation of FFSI could be said to be the culmination of the development of a film society movement which first took seeds in Britain in the early 1920s. India received the idea as a colony of the Imperial administration when a member of the British movement reached Bombay to attempt create a similar organisation in 1937. The effort failed because England went to war and dragged its colonies along thereby diverting the native resources away from arts and culture. It sealed the fate of the Amateur Film Society opened in Bombay until the WWII came to a close. When peace returned to India, film activities were revived in all its main production centres and Satyajit Ray found himself working in the film unit of Jean Renoir on his outdoor drama The River.

In 1947 the Calcutta Film Society was formed. The idea of film societies could now germinate in other cities, and new units were formed working independently from Delhi (1956), Bombay, Madras (1957), Roorkee, Patna (1958). In 1959, Agra and Faizabad also reported the formation of their own film clubs.

Chidananda Dasgupta, working in the USIS Center in Delhi, and Satyajit Ray, already an international film celebrity, were both exposed to world cinema and being also colleagues known to each other, decided to take the next big step to bring the various film societies together under an umbrella organisation to create the Federation.

The creation of the Federation helped the film clubs to now bargain with the national government to begin exchange of feature films under bilateral cultural exchanges. Soon a new traffic of films from the socialist and European countries started. Indian audiences began to learn of the existence of new alternate cinema other than the American and British English speaking film fare. Film historians began to call for corrections of the distortions of Imperial India. A banned Charles Chaplin was now free to send his films into India; Sergei Eisenstein’s Battleship Potemkin was allowed public screenings from 1955.

== Chapters, and central office bearers ==
Administratively, FFSI has divided its jurisdiction into four Regions of North, East, South and West, and one Sub-Region of Kerala with their Offices in Delhi, Kolkata, Hyderabad, Mumbai and Trivandrum respectively.

The central office is situated at C-7 Bharat Bhaban, 3 Chittaranjan Avenue, Kolkata 700072, India. The current president is Kiran V Shantaram and General Secretary is Amitava Ghosh.

== Jury ==
Each year FFSI deputes at least half a dozen of its senior film experts to work as jury members in international film festivals. Its members are also regular members of various film selection committees for international film festivals in India.

== Periodicals ==
FFSI brings out its monthly publication called FFSI Newsletter. Many of the film societies also bring out regular film newsletters featuring the working of their organisation and those of their sister units.

== Book ==
'Indian Film Culture: Indian Cinema' is a book published recently by FFSI in association with the V. Shantaram Motion Picture Scientific Research and Cultural Foundation Mumbai, Celluloid Chapter Jamshedpur, and FFSI Keralam.

== See also ==
- SiGNS Film Festival
