= List of Indian Bengali films of 2025 =

This is a list of Bengali cinema films released in 2025.

== January–March ==
Opening		Title	Director	Cast	Production Company	Ref.
J A N	3	Turuper Tass	Debjit Hazra	Sourav Das; Rajatava Dutta; Judhajit Sarkar; Sreya Bhattacharyya	Dream Hawker Entertainment	
J A N	3	Parama: A Journey with Aparna Sen	Suman Ghosh	Aparna Sen; Konkona Sen Sharma; Shabana Azmi	Maya Leela Films	
J A N	10	Bhaggyolokkhi	Mainak Bhaumik	Ritwick Chakraborty; Solanki Roy; Swastika Dutta; Subrat Dutta; Sujan Mukherjee	Nandy Movies	
J A N	10	Oporichito	Joydeep Mukherjee	Ritwick Chakraborty; Ishaa Saha; Anirban Chakrabarti	Eskay Movies	
J A N	10	Pataligunjer Putul Khela	Subhankar Chattopadhyay	Soham Majumdar; Paran Bandopadhyay; Ditipriya Roy; Rajatava Dutta; Tanima Sen; Dipankar De; Sumit Samaddar; Manasi Sinha; Mir Afsar Ali	Jalan Productions	
J A N	17	Felubakshi	Debraj Sinha	Soham Chakraborty; Madhumita Sarcar	Medianext Entertainment	
J A N	17	Jhumur	Barun Das	Rajsree; John Bhattacharya; Kharaj Mukherjee; Rajesh Sharma; Laboni Sarkar	Krishna Cinema And Entertainment	
J A N	23	Shotyi Bole Shotyi Kicchu Nei	Srijit Mukherji	Parambrata Chatterjee; Ritwick Chakraborty; Arjun Chakrabarty; Sauraseni Maitra; Kaushik Ganguly; Ananya Chatterjee; Kaushik Sen; Anirban Chakrabarti; Kanchan Mullick	Shree Venkatesh Films	
J A N	23	Binodiini: Ekti Natir Upakhyan	Ram Kamal Mukherjee	Rukmini Maitra; Rahul Bose; Om Sahani; Kaushik Ganguly; Chandrayee Ghosh; Mir Afsar Ali	Dev Entertainment Ventures	
J A N	31	Omorshongi	Dibya Chatterjee	Vikram Chatterjee; Sohini Sarkar; Shreema Bhattacherjee	Dreams On Sale	
J A N	31	Ei Raat Tomar Amaar	Parambrata Chatterjee	Anjan Dutt; Aparna Sen	Hoichoi Studios	
J A N	31	Jodi Emon Hoto	Rabindra Nambiar	Sean Banerjee; Ditipriya Roy; Rishav Basu	Eskay Movies	
F E B	7	Mayanagar	Aditya Vikram Sengupta	Sreelekha Mitra; Reekita Nondine Shimu; Bratya Basu	For Films	
F E B	14	Babu Shona	Anshuman Pratyush	Jeetu Kamal; Srabanti Chatterjee; Payel Sarkar; Alexandra Taylor	Eskay Movies	
F E B	21	Porichoy Gupta	Ron Raj	Ritwick Chakraborty; Indraneil Sengupta; Darshana Banik; Ayantika Bannerjee; Joy Sengupta	Purnanjali Media Private Limited, Pandey Motion Pictures	
F E B	21	Karon Greece Amader Desh Na	Sudipta Laha	Anindya Sengupta; Tanusree Chakraborty; Kamaleshwar Mukherjee; Parthasarathi Chakraborty; Gourab Chatterjee	Screema Creation Production	
F E B	21	Dashoi June	Rupak Chakraborty	Saurav Das; Soumitrisha Kundu	Sun Venture	
F E B	28	Dhrubor Aschorjo Jibon	Abhijit Chowdhury	Rishav Basu; Debesh Chattopadhyay; Ritwika Pal; Badshah Moitra	Fourth Bell Production	
F E B	28	Mukhoshe Manushe Khela	Orpheus Mukhoty	Joydip Chakraborty; Priyanka Sarkar	Sabitri Productions	
M A R	7	Grihostho	Mainak Bhaumik	Ritabhari Chakraborty; Saheb Bhattacharya	Eskay Movies	
M A R	7	Chhaad – The Terrace	Indrani Chakrabarty	Paoli Dam; Rahul Banerjee; Rajnandini Paul	National Film Development Corporation	
M A R	7	Girgiti	Arrpann Sarrkar	Saurav Das; Jammy Banerjee; Payel Roy	Morning Mystery Production	
M A R	7	Goal – The Aim	Raaj Mukherjee	Biswanath Basu; Indrani Dutta	Artage Media	
M A R	7	Nana Hee	Sayan Bandyopadhyay, Anjanabha Roy	Kharaj Mukherjee; Saurav Das; Sritama Dey; Sreya Bhattacharyya	Mojotale Entertainment	
M A R	14	Alakshye Ritwik	Subhankar Bhowmik	Silajit Majumder; Payel Sarkar	Dream Makers, Kolkata Entertainment	
M A R	21	Balaram Kando	Saptaswa Basu	Rajatava Dutta; Gargi Roychowdhury; Aishwarya Sen; Arya Dasgupta	Platinum Pictures	
M A R	21	Sunetra Sundaram	Shibram Sharma	Parno Mittra; Rupanjana Mitra; Kharaj Mukherjee; Somraj Maity	BD Box	
M A R	30	Hungama Dot Com	Krishnendu Chatterjee	Bonny Sengupta; Koushani Mukherjee; Om Sahani; Srabanti Chatterjee	SS3 Entertainment; Image Entertainment	

== April–June ==
Opening		Title	Director	Cast	Production Company	Ref.
A P R	11	Killbill Society	Srijit Mukherji	Parambrata Chatterjee; Koushani Mukherjee; Biswanath Basu; Soumen Chakraborty; Sandipta Sen	SVF	
A P R	11	Puratawn	Suman Ghosh	Sharmila Tagore; Rituparna Sengupta; Indraneil Sengupta	Bhavna Aaj O Kal	
A P R	18	Annapurna	Anshuman Pratyush	Ananya Chatterjee; Ditipriya Roy; Rishav Basu	Eskay Movies	
A P R	18	Check In Cheque Out	Satrajit Sen	Ishaa Saha; Aryann Bhowmik; Chandrayee Ghosh; Anuradha Mukherjee	Techno India Group, Novotel	
A P R	25	Aarii	Jiit Chakraborty	Yash Dasgupta; Moushumi Chatterjee; Nusrat Jahan; Kamaleshwar Mukherjee	YD Films	
A P R	25	Durgapur Junction	Arindam Bhattacharya	Vikram Chatterjee; Swastika Mukherjee	Dreamliner Entertainment	
A P R	25	Prasna	Milan Bhowmik	Payel Sarkar; Raj Bhowmik; Rajesh Sharma	KSM Film Combine	
A P R	25	Bhamini	Swarnayu Maitra	Priyanka Sarkar; Tathagata Mukherjee	Ohmkar Films	
M A Y	1	Shreeman v/s Shreemati	Pathikrit Basu	Mithun Chakraborty; Anjan Dutt; Madhumita Sarcar; Parambrata Chatterjee; Anjana Basu; Roshni Bhattacharyya; Tanima Sen	Kahhak Studios	
M A Y	9	Aamar Boss	Nandita Roy & Siboprosad Mukherjee	Shiboprosad Mukherjee; Rakhee Gulzar; Srabanti Chatterjee; Sauraseni Maitra	Windows Production	
M A Y	16	The Eken: Benaras e Bibhishika	Joydeep Mukherjee	Anirban Chakrabarti; Saswata Chatterjee; Ishaa Saha; Somak Ghosh; Suhotra Mukhopadhyay; Gaurav Chakrabarty; Biswanath Basu	Hoichoi Studios	
M A Y	23	Chandrabindoo	Raja Chanda	Ankush Hazra; Oindrila Sen; Anirban Chakrabarti; Shantilal Mukherjee; Saheb Bhattacharya	Eskay Movies	
M A Y	23	Onko Ki Kothin	Saurav Palodhi	Parno Mitra; Sankar Debnath; Ushasie Chakraborty; Prasun Shome	Dag Creative Media	
M A Y	23	Bramhaarjun	Souvik Dey	Rohan Bhattacharjee; Anindya Sengupta; Priyanka Bhattacharjee	MS Films & Productions	
M A Y	30	Sonar Kellay Jawkerdhan	Sayantan Ghosal	Parambrata Chatterjee; Koel Mallick; Gaurav Chakrabarty	Surinder Films	
M A Y	30	Torsha Ekti Nodir Naam	Krishnendu Sannigrahi	Sudip Mukherjee; Dipanwita Ghosh	Tithos Entertainment	
J U N	6	Raas	Tathagata Mukherjee	Vikram Chatterjee; Anirban Chakrabarti; Anashua Majumdar; Sudip Mukherjee; Devlina Kumar	Chhobir Moto Entertainment	
J U N	6	Batshorik	Mainak Bhaumik	Ritabhari Chakraborty; Satabdi Roy	Big Screen Productions House	
J U N	6	Chabiwala	Raja Ghosh	Dhritiman Chatterjee; Subhasish Mukherjee; Rahul Banerjee; Sohag Sen; Amrita Chattopadhyay	Dhagaa Productions	
J U N	13	Pokkhirajer Dim	Soukarya Ghosal	Anirban Bhattacharya; Mahabrata Basu; Anumegha Banerjee; Alexx O'Nell	SVF, Jio Studios	
J U N	13	Grihapravesh	Indraadip Dasgupta	Subhashree Ganguly; Kaushik Ganguly; Jeetu Kamal; Rudranil Ghosh; Sohini Sengupta	Kaleidoscope Productions	
J U N	13	Aapish (The Office)	Abhijit Guha, Sudeshna Roy	Sudipta Chakraborty; Tathagata Choudhury; Sandipta Sen; Kinjal Nanda	Macneill Engineering Limited	
J U N	20	Rabindra Kabya Rahasya	Sayantan Ghosal	Ritwick Chakraborty; Srabanti Chatterjee	Eskay Movies	
J U N	27	Mrigaya: The Hunt	Abhirup Ghosh	Vikram Chatterjee; Ritwick Chakraborty; Anirban Chakrabarti; Sourav Das; Priyanka Sarkar	Tenth Dimension Entertainment	
J U N	27	Bhuto Purbo	Kakoli Ghosh & Avinab Mukherjee	Rupanjana Mitra; Sandipta Sen; Saptarshi Maulik; Satyam Bhattacharya; Suhotra Mukhopadhyay; Amrita Chattopadhyay	Indoshree	

== July–September ==
Opening		Title	Director	Cast	Production Company	Ref.
J U L	4	Madam Sengupta	Sayantan Ghosal	Rituparna Sengupta; Rahul Bose; Kaushik Sen; Ananya Chatterjee	Nandy Movies	
J U L	18	Dear Maa	Aniruddha Roy Chowdhury	Jaya Ahsan; Chandan Roy Sanyal; Saswata Chatterjee; Dhritiman Chatterjee	Opus Communications	
J U L	25	Goodbye Mountain	Indrasis Acharya	Rituparna Sengupta; Indraneil Sengupta	WM Movies	
A U G	1	Putul Nacher Itikatha	Suman Mukhopadhyay	Abir Chatterjee; Jaya Ahsan; Dhritiman Chatterjee; Ananya Chatterjee; Surangana Bandyopadhyay; Parambrata Chatterjee	Kaleidoscope Entertainment	
A U G	14	Dhumketu	Kaushik Ganguly	Dev; Subhashree Ganguly; Rudranil Ghosh; Parambrata Chatterjee; Chiranjeet Chakraborty	Dev Entertainment Ventures, Dag Creative Media	
A U G	22	Tobuo Bhalobashi	Rabindra Nambiar	Saheb Bhattacharya; Aryann Bhowmik	Eskay Movies	
A U G	29	Saralakkho Holmes	Sayantan Ghosal	Saheb Bhattacharya; Rishav Basu; Gaurav Chakrabarty	Eskay Movies	
A U G	29	Bela	Anilavaa Chatterjee	Rituparna Sengupta; Bhaswar Chatterjee; Basabdatta Chatterjee; Biswajit Chakraborty; Mir Afsar Ali	Grey Mind Communication Pvt	
A U G	29	Bahurup	Aakash Malakar	Soham Chakraborty; Idhika Paul; Bharat Kaul; Debolina Dutta	Rukmini Films and Entertainment	
A U G	29	Gauri	Prosenjit Halder	Aryann Bhowmik; Paran Banerjee; Satakshi Nandy; Chandan Sen; Sanjib Sarkar	L P D Production	
S E P	5	Devi - Ek Pret Manabir Panchali	Souptick C.	Ranieeta Dash; Somraj Maity; Rahul Banerjee; Anjana Basu	Echo Entertainment PVT. LTD.	
S E P	5	Jhor	Anthony Jane	Bonny Sengupta; Sourav Das; Amrita Saha; Rajatabha Dutta; Shantilal Mukherjee	PS Entertainment	
S E P	19	Kapal	Suvendu Ghosh	Raja Sarkar; Sukanya Dutta; Kanchana Moitra	SGF (Suvendu Ghosh Films)	
S E P	25	Raghu Dakat	Dhrubo Bannerjee	Dev; Anirban Bhattacharya; Sohini Sarkar; Idhika Paul; Roopa Ganguly	SVF, Dev Entertainment Ventures	
S E P	25	Raktabeej 2	Shiboprosad Mukherjee and Nandita Roy	Victor Banerjee; Seema Biswas; Abir Chatterjee; Ankush Hazra; Mimi Chakraborty; Koushani Mukherjee; Kanchan Mullick	Windows Production	
S E P	26	Devi Chowdhurani	Subhrajit Mitra	Prosenjit Chatterjee; Srabanti Chatterjee; Alexx O'Nell; Darshana Banik; Arjun Chakrabarty; Bibriti Chatterjee; Sabyasachi Chakrabarty	Adited Motion Pictures	
S E P	26	Joto Kando Kolkatatei	Anik Dutta	Abir Chatterjee; Quazi Nawshaba Ahmed; Aparajita Ghosh Das; Roja Paromita Dey; Paran Banerjee	Friends Communications	

== October–December ==
Opening		Title	Director	Cast	Production Company	Ref.
O C T	10	Nabadurga Matrirupeno Sansthita	Satyabrata Kumar	Papiya Adhikari; Billadal Chatterjee; Arpan Kumar Sharma	Kristi Creation	
O C T	21	Sharthopor	Annapurna Basu	Koel Mallick; Ranjit Mallick; Kaushik Sen; Anirban Chakrabarti	Surinder Films	
O C T	31	Shree Durga	Sandeep Sathi	Aparajita Auddy; Joy Kumar Mukherjee	Lezend Films	
N O V	7	Ranna Baati	Pratim D. Gupta	Ritwick Chakraborty; Solanki Roy; Sohini Sarkar; Anirban Chakrabarti	Nandy Movies	
N O V	21	The Academy of Fine Arts	Jayabrata Das	Payel Sarkar; Rudranil Ghosh; Saurav Das; Rahul Banerjee	Pramod Films, Cinenic Studios	
N O V	21	Lokkhikantopur Local	Ram Kamal Mukherjee	Paoli Dam; Saayoni Ghosh; Rituparna Sengupta; Kaushik Ganguly; Chandrayee Ghosh	Angel Creations	
N O V	21	Deep Fridge	Arjunn Dutta	Abir Chatterjee; Tanusree Chakraborty; Anuradha Mukherjee	Colours of Dream Entertainment	
N O V	21	Police	Raja Chanda	Tota Roy Chowdhury	Parthana Retail Project	
N O V	28	Haati Haati Paa Paa	Arnab Midda	Chiranjeet Chakraborty, Rukmini Maitra	Celluloid Films	
N O V	28	Deri Hoye Geche	Saptaswa Basu	Anjan Dutt; Mamata Shankar	Platinum Pictures, SVM Studios	
D E C	6	Rappa Roy & Full Stop Dot Com	Dhiman Barman	Rajatava Dutta; Alivia Sarkar; Shantilal Mukherjee; Sourav Das	Dhiman Barman Production	
D E C	12	Danab	Atiul Islam	Kaushik Banerjee; Rupsha Mukhopadhyay; Hiya Roy	Mohona Films	
D E C	25	Projapati 2	Avijit Sen	Dev; Mithun Chakraborty; Idhika Paul; Jyotirmoyee Kundu; Shakuntala Barua; Kharaj Mukherjee	Bengal Talkies and Dev Entertainment Ventures	
D E C	25	Lawho Gouranger Naam Rey	Srijit Mukherji	Ishaa Saha; Bratya Basu; Indraneil Sengupta; Subhashree Ganguly; Dibyojyoti Dutta	Dag Creative Media, Shree Venkatesh Films	
D E C	25	Mitin: Ekti Khunir Sandhaney	Arindam Sil	Koel Mallick; Anashua Majumdar; Gaurav Chakrabarty; Saheb Chatterjee	Surinder Films	
