= Somlata Acharyya Chowdhury =

Indian singer from West Bengal, India

- Born: Somlata Acharyya Chowdhury; 11 February 1985 (age 41); Kolkata, West Bengal, India
- Genres: Rabindra Sangeet, Soft Rock, Semi Classical, Pop Music
- Occupation: Singer
- Instrument: Vocals
- Years active: 2009-present
- Label: Independent
- Website: somlata.com

Somlata Acharyya Chowdhury is an Indian Bengali-language singer and a faculty member at the Department of Psychology at Asutosh College, which is affiliated with the University of Calcutta. She rose to fame with the release of 'Tumi Asbe Bole' and 'Jagarane Jay Bibhabaree' from the Bengali film Ranjana Ami Ar Ashbona in 2011. She has been a prominent singer in Bengali films since 2007. Besides films, she also worked for several solo albums with her band Somlata & the Aces. Apart from being a singer, she works as a guest lecturer of psychology at Asutosh College, Kolkata.

== Discography ==
=== Solo albums and singles ===
- Chupkatha (2009)
- Aami Achhi Er Majhe (2014)
- Mor Bhabonare (2016)
- Aabdaar (Single) (2017)
- Kya karoon Sajni (2018)
- Yaad Piya Ki aye (2018)
- Ure Jete Chaye (2019)
- Naina Morey (2019)
- Protisruti (2019)
- Khuje Paabe Na Amake (2019)
- O Je Mane Na Mana (2020)
- Ure Jete Chaye (Reprise) (2020)
- Nishitho Raater (2021)
- Kanamachhi (2021)
- Tomar Ghore Bosot Kore Koyjona (2022)
- Aaj Jemon Kore Gaiche Aakash (2022)
- Diary (2022)
- Zindagi (2024)
- Ami Achhi Er Majhe (Reprised) (2025)
- Megh Boleche Jabo Jabo [Somlata, Joy Sarkar] (2026)

== Filmography ==
Somlata sang her first playback for the crossover film Perfect Woman in 2007. All the songs are in Bengali language, unless mentioned.

| Year | Film | Songs | Composer(s) | Writer(s) | Co-artist(s) |
|---|---|---|---|---|---|
| 2007 | Perfect Woman | | | | |
| 2009 | Cross Connection | | | | |
| 2010 | U-Turn | | | | |
| 2011 | Ranjana Ami Ar Ashbona | Andhokarer Pare Ekla Anek Dur Brishti Chalo Jai Jagorone Jay Bibhabori Tumi Ashbe Bole | Neel Dutt | Anjan Dutt | Anjan Dutt Kabir Suman |
| 2011 | Seven Days | | | | |
| 2011 | Bedroom | Mayabono Biharini Horini | Rabindranath Tagore Rupam Islam & Allan Temjen Ao | Rabindranath Tagore | |
| 2012 | Elar Char Adhyay | Ay tobe Sohochori | | | |
| 2012 | Dutta Vs Dutta | Bhalobeshe Shokhi Uthogo Bharatalakkhi | Rabindranath Tagore Neel Dutt | Rabindranath Tagore Anjan Dutt | Rupankar Bagchi Anjan Dutt |
| 2012 | Maach Mishti & More | Tumi Ebar | Neel Dutt | | |
| 2012 | Bojhena Shey Bojhena | Bhagoban | Arindom Chatterjee | Prasen | |
| 2013 | Half Serious | Keno je chokh rangash | Joy Sarkar | | |
| 2013 | Antaraal | Tor Janyo Sokal Bhange | | | |
| 2013 | Ashbo Ar Ek Din | Ei toh khub kache | | | |
| 2014 | Hercules | Chand Bheshe Jaaye | | | |
| 2014 | Aamar Aami | Onno Keu Thakbe Kachakachi | Kabir & Shiba | Orko Sinha | Anupam Roy |
| 2014 | Chotushkone | Mone Porar Gaan | Anupam Roy | Anupam Roy | |
| 2014 | Ek Phali Rod | Bhondhoghorer Gheratope | | | |
| 2014 | Biye Not Out | | | | |
| 2014 | Khola Hawa | Tomake Firiye Diye Tomar Khola Haowa | Neel Dutt Rabindranath Tagore | Srijato Rabindranath Tagore | |
| 2015 | Bheetu | Jodi Ar Ektu Naamey Brishti | | | |
| 2015 | Bela Seshe | Shesh Belay | Anupam Roy | | Rupankar Bagchi |
| 2015 | Bitnoon | Jhiri Jhiri Kichhu Brishtir Sathe | | | |
| 2015 | Family Album | Balika | | | |
| 2015 | Jomer Raja Dilo Bor | Kichhuta Rahossyo | Anupam Roy | | |
| 2015 | Chitra | | | | |
| 2015 | Shudhu Tomari Jonyo | Jeno Tomari Kache Egiye De (Reprise Version) | Arindom Chatterjee | | |
| 2015 | Sesh Shangbaad | Dhulomakha Canvas | | | |
| 2017 | Bibaho Diaries | Nachorbanda Mon | | | |
| 2017 | Kichu Na Bola Kotha | Title Track | Amit Mitra | Dipankar | |
| 2017 | Cross Connection 2 | | | | |
| 2017 | Cockpit | Bhalobasa jaak | Arindom Chatterjee | Prasen | Arijit Singh |
| 2017 | Dhaka Attack | Tup Tap | Arindom Chatterjee | Anindya Chatterjee | Arijit Singh |
| 2017 | Ghawre & Baire | Sonakathi | | | |
| Michael | Michael | Sorry | | | |
| 2018 | Uma | Esho Bondhu | | | |
| 2018 | Sesher Galpo | | | | |
| 2018 | Ghare And Baire | Shonakathi | Savvy | Dipangshu Acharya | |
| 2019 | Ahaa Re | Aay Behestey Ke Jabi Aaay | Savvy | Kaji Nazrul Islam | |
| 2019 | Bhootchakra Pvt. Ltd. | Na Na Jeyo Na | Anupam Roy | | |
| 2020 | Din Ratrir Galpo | | | | |
| 2020 | Brahma Janen Gopon Kommoti | Tui Chol | Anindya Chatterjee | | |
| 2020 | Cheeni | Amader Kothagulo | Prasen | | |
| 2021 | Shrimati | Shon Shon | Soumya Rit | | |
| 2022 | Mini | Besure | Savvy | Ritam Sen | |
| 2022 | Lokkhi Chhele | Lokkhi Chhele Promotional Song | | | |
| 2022 | Ogo Bideshini | Ogo Bideshini | Pratik Kundu | | |
| 2022 | Shubho Bijoya | Phire Esho Bar Bar | Aninda Chatterjee | Raj Sen | |
| 2023 | Manobjomin | Shiraye Chhote Traffic | Joy Sarkar | Srijato | |
| 2023 | Cheeni 2 | Emon Ekta Bondhu | Mainak Mazoomdar | Barish | |
| 2023 | Love Marriage | Jodidong Hridoyong Tobo | Savvy | Srijato | Rupak Tiary |
| 2024 | Pariah | Bhalobashar Naam (Female) | Ranajoy Bhattacharjee | Tathagata Mukherjee | |
| 2024 | Murder By The sea | Shomudrer Dheu | Neel Dutt | | Durnibar Saha |
| 2024 | Alaap | Abohawa Bole Dey | Anupam Roy | | Rohan Basu |
| 2025 | Oporichito | Amake Khunje Pabe | Suvam Moitra | Nilanjan Mondal | Shashwat Singh |
| 2025 | Grihostho | Urey Jak | Savvy | Barish | |
| 2025 | Grihostho | Nisiddho Jibon | Savvy | Barish | |
| 2025 | Killbill Society | Nei Tumi Aager Moto | Anupam Roy | Anupam Roy | Anupam Roy |
| 2025 | Felubakshi | Ami Bhul Hoye Bhul Hoye Jayi | Amlaan A Chakraborty | | |
| 2025 | Annapurna | Sharat Mane | Pratik Kundu | | |
| 2025 | Shelai | Mitthey Abhiman | Soumalya Sinha | Sayandeep Jana & Soumalya Sinha | |
| 2025 | Mrigaya | Shunye Shuru | Rana Mazumder | Debasis Datta | |
| 2025 | Raas | Amra Dujona | Manoj Murli Nair | | |
| 2025 | Raas | Baandh Bhenge Dao | Manoj Murli Nair | Rabindranath Tagore | |
| 2025 | Bahurup | Phiriye Dio Na Go Rai | Arpita Abhishek | | Timir Biswas |
| 2025 | Bela | Nijeke Besechi Boro Bhalo | Ranajoy Bhattacharjee | Tamoghna Chatterjee | |
| 2026 | Nari Choritra Bejay Jotil | Shono Go Dokhino Hawa | Ishan Mitra | Meera Dev Burman | Durnibar Saha |

== Live performances ==
Chowdhury performs in live shows with her band Somlata and The Aces. Besides performing in various live concerts all over India, they have also performed at concerts in countries including Bangladesh, the US, United Kingdom, Canada, United Arab Emirates, Hong Kong, and Kuwait. Their live sound can be described as a platter of Indian Semi Classical, Pop Rock, Modern Film Songs, Folk Fusion and Sufi. The band is particularly popular among young people and performs at campus festivals, corporate events, televised shows, public concerts, government events and shows in other countries.

The band lineup is:

Somlata Acharyya Chowdhury: Vocals

Arnab Roy: Guitars

Abhishek Bhattacharya: Bass Guitars

Tushar Banerjee: Drums & Percussions

== Awards ==
- Best Discovery Award at ETV Dada na Didi: Gaaner Big Fight
- Agami Diner Star at Star Jalsha Entertainment Awards (2010)
- Anandalok Special Jury Award
- Etv Bangla Best playback (female)
- Tele Cine Awards for Best Female Singer
- Mirchi Music Awards Bangla for Best Female Singer 2017
- Radio Mirchi best Film " Bojhena Shey Bojhena "
- Radio Mirchi best Film " Bibaho Diaries "
- Radio Mirchi best female singer
- Times Power Women 2018
- Times Style Icon 2019
- Sangeet Shomman 2019, West Bengal Govt.
