= Solanki Roy =

Indian Bengali actress

- Born: 18 September 1994 (age 32); Bidhannagar, Kolkata, West Bengal, India
- Occupations: Actress, model
- Years active: 2013–present
- Notable work: Ichche Nodee; Montu Pilot; Prothoma Kadambini; Baba Baby O; Gaatchora; Shohorer Ushnotomo Din E
- Spouse: Shakya Bose (m. 2018; div. 2023)

Solanki Roy (Bengali: শোলাঙ্কি রায়) is an Indian actress who primarily works in Bengali Cinema, television and web series. She is best known for her lead roles in the daily soaps Ichche Nodee, Prothoma Kadambini and Gaatchora. She made her film debut with Baba Baby O (2022). For her second film, Shohorer Ushnotomo Din E (2023), she was nominated for the Filmfare Award Bangla for Best Actress.

== Early life ==
Roy was born and raised in Kolkata. She studied at Bidhannagar Municipal School and graduated with a degree in Political Science from Bidhannagar College in Kolkata. Later, she did her post-graduation in International Relations at Jadavpur University. She married Shakya Bose, a New Zealand-based banker, in 2018. Later, they got divorced in 2023 by mutual decision.

== Career ==
Roy made her first television appearance in ETV Bangla's (Colors Bangla) Bengali serial Kotha Dilam (2014), playing the lead role of Sudha. She then played the lead role of Meghla opposite Vikram Chatterjee in Star Jalsha's TV serial Ichche Nodee (2015), which was well received by the audience. The success of the show turned her into a household name. She also appeared in the Zee Bangla serial Saat Bhai Champa and the Star Jalsha serial Phagun Bou. She played the role of Dr. Kadambini Ganguly aka Bini in Star Jalsha's period drama Prothoma Kadambini opposite Honey Bafna. The series was based on the biography of India's first practicing female physician Kadambini Ganguly.

She played Khori Singha Roy in the Bengali drama Gaatchora. Her chemistry with Gourab Chatterjee in the show was popular among the audience. Gaatchora was popular among viewers and consistently topped the TRP charts. The show's success was attributed to her portrayal of a headstrong independent young girl and her onscreen sizzling chemistry with Gourab Chatterjee, who played Riddhiman Singha Roy. The show and her character received the highest number of awards at the Star Jalsha Parivaar Awards 2022. It was one of the most popular Bengali serials on Star Jalsha during its airing. Her look in the show produced a new fashion trend for women in Bengal called the "Khori Look". She later exited the show on account of health problems.

In addition to television shows, she has also worked in Bengali web series like Dhanbad Blues, Paap, Montu Pilot, Saarey Saitrish and Boka Bakshote Bondi opposite Neel Bhattacharya.

Roy debuted in Bengali films with Baba Baby O (2022) opposite Jishu Sengupta, which opened to a good response. She then appeared in the coming-of-age drama Shohorer Ushnotomo Din E (2023). The film revolves around the lives of Anindita and Ritoban, a PhD student in London who returns to Kolkata after three years and runs into Anindita, who was his college sweetheart and is now a successful RJ. The film received a positive response upon release. Shamayita Chakraborty from OTT Play praised the freshness of the plot saying, "The overall performance is charming. Watch it for Vikram and Solanki's sizzling chemistry, very different expressions of love, and the idea of Kolkata that gives us warmth."

== Works ==
=== Films ===
Year	Film	Role	Notes	Ref
2022	Baba Baby O	Brishti Roy	Debut film	
2023	Shohorer Ushnotomo Din E	Anindita		
2025	Bhaggyolokkhi	Kaberi Ganguly		
2025	Ranna Baati	Supriya Dasgupta		

=== Television ===
Year	Title	Role	Channel	Notes
2014	Kotha Dilam	Sudha	Etv Bangla	Lead role
2015 – 2017	Ichche Nodee	Meghla Banerjee (née Sen)	Star Jalsha	Lead role
2017	Saat Bhai Champa	Rani Padmavati	Zee Bangla	Side Role (later replaced by Sonali Chowdhury)
2018	Jamai Raja	Tania Sen	Zee Bangla	Episodic role
2018	Phagun Bou	Dr. Mrinalini Sengupta	Star Jalsha	Cameo role
2020 – 2021	Prothoma Kadambini	Dr. Kadambini Ganguly aka Bini	Star Jalsha	Lead role
2021 – 2023	Gaatchora	Khori Singha Roy (née Bhattacharya)	Star Jalsha	Lead role
2025 – 2026	Milon Hobe Koto Dine	Ela Bose	Star Jalsha	Lead role

=== Web series ===
Year	Series	Character	OTT	Ref
2018	Dhanbad Blues	Riddhima	Hoichoi	
2019	Paap	Tiya	Hoichoi	
2019	Montu Pilot	Bhromor	Hoichoi	
2023	Saarey Shaitrish		Hoichoi	
2024	Boka Bakshote Bondi	Aupala	Hoichoi	
2025	Bishohori	Rajnandini	Hoichoi	

=== Mahalaya ===
Year	Title	Role	Channel
2022	Ya Chandi	Today's Durga (Representation of All Woman on Earth)	Star Jalsha

== Awards ==
Year	Award	Category	Show	Result
2015	Tele Samman Awards	Best Actress	Ichche Nodee	Won
2016	West Bengal Tele Academy Awards	Best Actress Serial	Ichche Nodee	Won
2016	West Bengal Tele Academy Awards	Best onscreen jodi(along with Vikram Chatterjee	Ichche Nodee	Won
2016	Star Parivaar Awards 2016	Priyo Notun Sodosyo Female	Ichche Nodee	Won
2021	Star Paribaar Awards	Favourite Style Icon Female	Prothoma Kadambini	Won
2021	Star Paribaar Awards	Banglar Gorbo Award	Prothoma Kadambini	Won
2021	Kolkata Glitz Awards 2021	KG Icon of the year 2021	Prothoma Kadambini	Won
2022	West Bengal Tele Academy Awards	Inspiring Character Female	Prothoma Kadambini	Won
2022	Star Paribaar Awards 2022	Best Meye/daughter	Gaatchora	Won
2022	Star Paribaar Awards 2022	Favourite Style Icon Female	Gaatchora	Won
2022	Star Paribaar Awards 2022	Best Stylish Juti/Jodi (along with Gourab Chatterjee)	Gaatchora	Won
2022	Kalakriti Awards	Best debutant	Baba Baby O	Won
2026	Star Jalsha Paribar Awards	Star Bouma	Milon Hobe Kotodine	Won
