= Tansener Tanpura =

Indian Bengali web series

- Release poster for Season 2
- Genre: Thriller
- Written by: Sougata Basu
- Directed by: Soumik Chattopadhyay
- Starring: Vikram Chatterjee; Rupsa Chatterjee; Jayati Bhatia
- Composer: Joy Sarkar
- Country of origin: India
- Original language: Bengali
- No. of seasons: 2
- No. of episodes: 19

Production
- Production company: Hoichoi

Original release
- Release: 26 June – 13 November 2020

Tansener Tanpura (lit. 'Tansen's Tanpura') is an Indian musical mystery web series. The series is about the notes and melodies of Hindustani classical music. Directed by Soumik Chattopadhyay, it was released on 26 June 2020 on the Hoichoi streaming service. A second season released on 13 November 2020.

== Description ==
The plot revolves around the travels of a youngster in search of haunting events and the truth. He sets out for Tansener Tanpura filled with the magic of music and a lot of mysteries.

The series features Vikram Chatterjee, Rupsha Chatterjee, Jayati Bhatia, Rajat Ganguly, Debesh Roychowdhury, Sujan Mukherjee, Subhashish Mukherjee, Bhaskar Banerjee in the lead roles. On 22 June hoichoi released an animated shot that looks back at the story's history.

== Cast ==
- Vikram Chatterjee as Alap
- Rupsa Chatterjee as Shruti
- Jayati Bhatia as Madhubanti Mishra
  - Anuradha Mukherjee as young Madhubanti Mishra
- Rajat Ganguly as Kedar Mishra
- Debesh Roychowdhury as Bahadur Hussain
- Neel Mukherjee as Lalit Sen
  - Suhotro Mukherjee as young Lalit Sen
- Subhashish Mukherjee as Ramnidhi Gosain
  - Saunak Samanta as young Ramnidhi Gosain
- Bhaskar Banerjee as Hemanta Ganguly
  - Satyam Bhattacharya as young Hemanta Ganguly
- Debshankar Haldar as Ranjan Ghosh
  - Gautam Siddhartha Ghosh as young Ranjan Ghosh
- Pushpita Mukherjee as Rohini / Raunak Bai
  - Angana Roy as young Rohini / young Raunak Bai
- Sourav Saha as the assistant of Ramnidhi Gosain
- Kalyan Chatterjee as the beggar
- Surajit Bandopadhyay as Sunil Mitra
- Pradip Dhar as the grandson of the beggar
- Pradip Bhattacharya as Madhubanti Mishra's house servant
- Soumyadip Banerjee
- Rupam as Chotu
- Soumitra Banerjee
- Goutam Saha
- Anirban Paria
- Jagannath Chakraborty

== Episodes ==
Series	Episodes	Originally released	
Series	Episodes	First released	Last released
1	10	26 June 2020	3 July 2020
2	9	13 November 2020	13 November 2020

== Season 1 (2020) ==
The series started streaming on 26 June 2020 on Bengali OTT platform Hoichoi with five episodes. On 3 July 2020 hoichoi released all the remaining episodes.

No.	Title	Directed by	Original release date
1	"Swaralipi"	Soumik Chattopadhyay	26 June 2020
2	"Jog-Sutra"	Soumik Chattopadhyay	26 June 2020
3	"Pancham Baad"	Soumik Chattopadhyay	26 June 2020
4	"Tunabha Nali"	Soumik Chattopadhyay	26 June 2020
5	"Hangsadhwani"	Soumik Chattopadhyay	26 June 2020
6	"Prashanna Biswas"	Soumik Chattopadhyay	3 July 2020
7	"Masitkhani Gat"	Soumik Chattopadhyay	3 July 2020
8	"Nawabi Khanjar"	Soumik Chattopadhyay	3 July 2020
9	"Snori Miyar Santan"	Soumik Chattopadhyay	3 July 2020
10	"Bangshporichay"	Soumik Chattopadhyay	3 July 2020

== Season 2 (2020) ==
No.	Title	Directed by	Original release date
1	"Shri'r Putro"	Soumik Chattopadhyay	13 November 2020
2	"Umrababi"	Soumik Chattopadhyay	13 November 2020
3	"Rai Dhairyang"	Soumik Chattopadhyay	13 November 2020
4	"Bilash Khan"	Soumik Chattopadhyay	13 November 2020
5	"Jogyotomo Shishya"	Soumik Chattopadhyay	13 November 2020
6	"Abarohon"	Soumik Chattopadhyay	13 November 2020
7	"Raag Deepak"	Soumik Chattopadhyay	13 November 2020
8	"Arohon"	Soumik Chattopadhyay	13 November 2020
9	"Miyan Ki Malhar"	Soumik Chattopadhyay	13 November 2020

== OST ==
Tansener Tanpura (season 2)

Soundtrack album by Joy Sarkar
- Released: 4 November 2020
- Recorded: 2020
- Genre: Television soundtrack
- Length: 3:46
- Language: Bengali
- Label: SVF Music

Music video
- "OST: Chhonnochhara Mon" on YouTube

The original soundtrack is composed by Joy Sarkar with lyrics by Srijato. The OST "Chhonnochhara Mon" has been sung by Somlata Acharyya Chowdhury, Jimut Roy, Soham Chakrabarty.
