= Omorshongi =

2025 Indian Bengali supernatural romance film

- Theatrical release poster
- Directed by: Dibya Chatterjee
- Story by: Aritra Sengupta; Dibya Chatterjee
- Produced by: Avinaba Ghosh; Paridhi Khaitan; Arnab Pal
- Starring: Vikram Chatterjee; Sohini Sarkar
- Cinematography: Abhimanyu Sengupta
- Edited by: Amir Mondal
- Music by: Arko; Ranajoy Bhattacharjee #abhikism Tamalika Golder; Neel Adhikari; Shomeshwar Oli; 8-Bit Culprit
- Production companies: Dreams On Sale Production; Handykraft Pictures
- Distributed by: SSR Cinemas
- Release date: 31 January 2025
- Country: India
- Language: Bengali

Omorshongi (transl. Immortal Companion) is a 2025 Bengali-language supernatural romantic comedy film co-written and directed by Dibya Chatterjee in his directorial debut. Produced by Avinaba Ghosh, Paridhi Khaitan and Arnab Pal under the banners of Dreams On Sale Productions and Handykraft Pictures, the film stars Vikram Chatterjee and Sohini Sarkar in the lead roles, while Dibyasha Das, Shreema Bhattacharya and Aniruddha Gupta play other pivotal roles. The film revolves around a grief stricken novelist, who is confronted by the ghost of his late girlfriend and she persuades him to move on with his life.

The film was announced in June 2023, marking the first collaboration between Vikram and Sohini. Principal photography commenced in August 2023 and wrapped by in April 2024. Written by Chatterjee with Aritra Sengupta, the cinematography and editing are handled by Abhimanyu Sengupta and Amir Mondal respectively. The film was released on 31 January 2025 to mixed reviews from the critics and positive reviews from the audience.

== Plot ==
The story revolves around two childhood sweethearts, Anurag and Joyee, who have been inseparable since their school days. They have been soulmates since the 5th grade. After being in love for many years, their marriage has been fixed, and they have brought a new house too, for moving in after marriage. But tragedy strikes their life as they are on the verge of starting a new phase of life together. Unexpectedly, Joyee dies of a heart attack just a day before the wedding. Anurag's world, once teeming with literary inspiration, now stagnates in an abyss of grief. But this doesn't end their love story.

He starts seeing fleeting apparitions of Joyee—her glimpses caught in mirror reflections and familiar corners of the room. He soon realised, what initially appeared to be hallucinatory projections of sorrow, had turned into an unsettling truth. Joyee has returned as a ghost, unwilling to leave Anurag behind. Anurag, an exhausted novelist, is perplexed by the complexity of the situation. Although initially terrified, he slowly starts to enjoy her presence, convincing himself that fate has given him a bonus round with the love of his life.

He further realised that only he can see Joyee's ghost, owing to the strong bonding of love in between them. Joyee is there, nagging, scolding, and comforting Anurag while refusing to fade into oblivion. After a few days, Anurag also perceived that neither can he touch her nor can they live a truly shared life. He is struck by a dilemma: whether it is possible to live and romance with a partner who no longer possesses a physical body. He is struck in a limbo as he realises that despite him growing old, she will not age.

He desperately attempts to make a true sense of Joyee's existence through the help of tantrics, spiritualists, and occult experts. He starts reading books on death and the afterlife and seeks help from temple priests. He becomes so involved with this, that he now wants to write horror stories in place of the romantic stories, which he had liked earlier. He madly seeks the answer about what is there after life. Although he contemplates a new relationship with Niharika, he realises all the more that he would never be able to move on from Joyee's intangible existence. Despite opening a new dynamic in his life, it further complicated his healing. He was unable to forget her and their shared memories.

He gets to know from a spiritualist that a close one who has died, can return as a ghost after death only if a major danger has passed or if a major danger is present in the near future. Since Anurag was the only one who could see her, he was the probable danger victim. He warned Anurag of a possible major danger upcoming in his life and asked him to be cautious. Despite his parents and to would-have-been in-laws persuading him to move on, he is stuck to Joyee's ghost and their love. Anurag is eager to know regarding the nature of longing between two special lovers and wants to make true sense of the possibility of a romantic love transcending death.

== Cast ==
- Vikram Chatterjee as Anurag
- Sohini Sarkar as Joyee
- Shreema Bhattacherjee as Shree
- Aniruddha Gupta as Anurag's confidant
- Dibyasha Das as Niharika
- Saumya Sengupta as Anurag's father
- Madhumita Chakraborty as Anurag's mother
- Sandip Bhattacharya as Joyee's father

=== Cameo appearances ===
- Ankush Hazra
- Madhumita Sarcar
- Bibriti Chatterjee
- Angana Roy
- Tathagata Mukherjee
- Qaushiq Mukherjee

== Production ==
=== Development ===
The film marked the Bengali film debut of director Dibya Chatterjee. The director explained that the title of the film is suggestive of a love story that transcends the mortal plane and means "Lovers beyond the realm". In an interview, the director informed that he didn't have any trouble while recruiting the cast and crew of the film. He decided to do a film in Bengali after meeting his childhood friend Abhinav, who assured him to produce the film. While the cinematographer was his flatmate in Mumbai, he approached Vikram and Sohini for knowing them previously from a web series.

Vikram spoke in an interview that he signed to the film for its script and unique genre, which encompasses the elements of horror with a romantic comedy film. Sohini also revealed that she signed the film owing to its interesting script and her personal acquaintance with the director after working in a Hindi language web series.

=== Filming ===
The cinematography has been done majorly in Kolkata and partially in Howrah. Major schedules have been shot in Rashbehari Avenue, Deshapriya Park regions of South Kolkata and on the banks of Hooghly River beside the Howrah Bridge. The filming was started on 25 August 2023. Sohini spoke about a rain scene, in which the artificial tank was finished in just taking Vikram's shots. She explained how difficult it was for her to wait till the next tank arrives, while holding on to that mood and emotion. The filming was completed and wrapped up on 21 April 2024.

=== Marketing ===
The first look of the characters was revealed on 21 August 2023. The first poster was released on 6 December 2024. The teaser was released on 17 December 2024. The trailer was released on 22 January 2025 on Zee Music Bangla and Dreams On Sale Youtube channels.

At the trailer launch event, the trailer was unveiled by Prosenjit Chatterjee. He was present as the chief guest at the event, as they makers decided to show respect to the 1987 Bengali classic Amar Sangee, which has the same title as their film. The lead pair did a Kolkata themed photoshoot with nostalgic Kolkata symbols like the yellow ambassador and Victoria Memorial, as a part of the promotions.

== Soundtrack ==
Omorshongi

Soundtrack album by Arko, Ranajoy Bhattacharjee, Abhikism, Tamalika Golder, Neel Adhikari, Shomeshwar Oli and 8-Bit Culprit
- Released: 2025
- Recorded: 2024
- Studios: Studio 504; RB Studios; Sound Symphony Studio
- Genre: Film soundtrack
- Length: 32:28
- Language: Bengali
- Label: Zee Music Bangla
External audio
- Omorshongi - Full Album (Audio Jukebox) on YouTube

The music of the film has been composed by Arko, Ranajoy Bhattacharjee, Abhikism, Tamalika Golder, Neel Adhikari, Shomeshwar Oli and 8-Bit Culprit. The lyrics have been penned by Shomeshwar Oli, #abhikism, Ranajoy Bhattacharjee and Swadesh Misra.

The first single "Purono Premer Poddo" was released on 10 January 2025. The second single "Raikamal" was released on 18 January 2025. The third single "Monihara" was released on 30 January 2025.

Track listing
No.	Title	Lyrics	Music	Singer(s)	Length
1.	"Purono Premer Poddo"	Shomeshwar Oli	Arko	Arko	4:28
2.	"Monihara"	Abhikism	Abhikism	Rishi Chanda, Abhikism	3:56
3.	"Shiuli"	Ranajoy Bhattacharjee	Ranajoy Bhattacharjee	Debayan Banerjee, Shaoni Mojumdar, Ranajoy Bhattacharjee	4:14
4.	"Purono Premer Poddo - Duet"	Shomeshwar Oli	Arko	Arko, Srijani Dan	4:27
5.	"Raikamal"	Swadesh Misra	Tamalika Golder	Chakropani Dev	3:27
6.	"Lovers Beyond Realms"		Neel Adhikari		3:19
7.	"Nuton In The House"	Rabindranath Tagore	Rabindranath Tagore, Neel Adhikari	Tomali Chaudhuri, Srabani Chakraborty, Rama Ghose, Kajali Chatterjee, Indrani Mukherjee	2:21
8.	"Dirty Nights"		8-Bit Culprit		6:30
Total length:					32:28

== Release ==
The film was released in the theatres on 31 January 2025, at 56 cinemas with 66 shows.

== Reception ==
=== Critical reception ===
Agnivo Niyogi of The Telegraph reviewed the film on a positive note and wrote "Omorshongi roots itself in Bengali sensibilities as it looks at the nature of longing and the possibility of a romantic love transcending death. The film is an interesting take on romance, fusing supernatural elements with comedy and it strikes a drama bittersweet balance between humour and heartache." She praised Vikram and Sohini's chemistry, the cinematography, the songs and the score but bemoaned the pace in the second half.

A reviewer from India TV reviewed the film on a positive note and opined "With noteworthy performances from Vikram Chatterjee and Sohini Sarkar, this movie will make you laugh, cry, and reimagine everything you thought you knew about love through a lens of eerie and emotional depth." He specially praised the director for his uniquely crafted storytelling style that blends dark comedy, horror and deeply emotional themes of love and loss.

Deborshi Bandyopadhyay of Anandabazar Patrika rated the film 7/10 stars and noted "Despite having a few loopholes, the film is a full-on entertainment and family watch package. The film has a certain intoxication and trance, which is produced by the well designed cinematography." He praised the chemistry between the lead, the screenplay and the storytelling style of the director but bemoaned the lack of emotional depth in the sub-plots in the film and repetitive scenes in the second half.

Sandipta Bhanja of Sangbad Pratidin reviewed the film and wrote "Although the horror element in the film is not scares you, it gives you a feel good wali romantic story." She praised the chemistry between Vikram-Sohini, their effortless acting - dialogue deliveries, numerous emotionally drenched romantic dialogues throughout the film, the songs, cinematography and cameos but pointed out the lack of emotional depth in certain scenes, weak acting of the supporting cast and repetitive scenes in second half.

Poorna Banerjee of the Times of India rated the film 2/5 stars and highlighted "Despite strong performances, a solid soundtrack, memorable cameos, and a few humorous moments, Omorshongi struggles to deliver a meaningful blend of horror and comedy. The pacing issues and the film's tendency to drag on hinder its emotional impact." She praised Vikram and Sohini's on-screen chemistry and the cameos but criticised the slow pace, unnecessary plot veer offs and occasionally forced comedy.

== Controversy ==
Five days prior to the release on 26 January 2025, posters of the film were torn in many parts of Kolkata, specially in Lake Gardens. The makers informed that they noticed it when they went out at night to see if they posters have been attached properly across the city. They took to their social media handles and expressed their concern regarding the tearing up of only the posters of their film, while posters of other upcoming films were there. Vikram informed, posters worth thousands were brought here from Chennai and due to budget issues, it was not possible for the producer to reprint them.
