= Bishohori (TV series) =

2025 Indian Bengali web series

- Release poster
- Genre: Mythological mystery thriller
- Based on: Manasamangal Kāvya
- Written by: Souvik Chakraborty
- Screenplay by: Sreejib
- Directed by: Srijit Roy
- Starring: Solanki Roy; Rohaan Bhattacharjee; Shankar Chakraborty; Koushik Roy
- Theme music composer: Nabarun Bose
- Composer: Nabarun Bose
- Country of origin: India
- Original language: Bengali
- No. of seasons: 1
- No. of episodes: 6

Production
- Cinematography: Ramyadip Saha
- Editor: Subhajit Singha
- Camera setup: Single-camera
- Running time: 20-28 minutes
- Production company: A Long Journey Entertainment

Original release
- Release: 14 February 2025

Bishohori (transl. Maa Manasa) is a 2025 Indian Bengali language supernatural mythological mystery thriller web series. Directed by Srijit Roy and written by Souvik Chakraborty, the series is a contemporary adaptation of an ancient Bengali mythology related to Goddess Manasa, the Manasamangal Kāvya.

Produced by a A Long Journey Entertainment and Hoichoi, it was initially scheduled to stream in 2024. After being delayed due to post production issues, it was streamed on Hoichoi on 14 February 2025. The web series stars Solanki Roy, who plays the lead role of Rajnandini, a woman who marries into a family haunted by a curse. Rohaan Bhattacharjee and Shankar Chakraborty play other pivotal roles. The series was praised by the critics as well as the audience.

== Synopsis ==
The story of Bishohori revolves around a family haunted by a 200 years-old curse and a series of mysterious deaths linked to the Naga Panchami festival. A modern, urban bride, Rajnandini, gets married in this family and is shocked to discover their dark secrets and superstitions. She refuses to accept the family's beliefs and uncovers the truth behind the deaths, challenging their faith and traditions. It draws inspiration from the legend of Behula and Lakhindar in Manasamangal Kavya.

== Cast ==
- Solanki Roy as Rajnandini
- Rohaan Bhattacharjee as Tathagata Mitra, Animesh and Rita's son
- Shankar Chakraborty as Avinash Mitra, eldest son of Mitra family
- Moyna Mukherji as Pramila Mitra, Avinash's wife
- Koushik Roy as Abhirup Mitra, Avinash and Pramila's so
- Animesh Bhaduri as Animesh Mitra, middle son of Mitra family
- Sumit Samaddar as Aniket Mitra, youngest son of Mitra family

== Production ==
It was announced on 15 October 2024 by Hoichoi, along with 10 other of their upcoming projects, including Dainee, Kaalratri and Nikosh Chhaya. The filming began in 2024 and was wrapped up within September, the same year. Most of the filming was done in an ancestral mansion with a few scenes shot in its adjoining forest and locality.

== Release ==
It was initially scheduled to stream on Hoichoi in 2024. But it was delayed due to the then ongoing tussle between the director's guild and Bengali Film Federation with the technicians association in Tollywood Film Industry. After a brief delay, it was streamed on Hoichoi on 14 February 2025.

== Episodes ==
No.	Title	Directed by	Written by	Original release date
1	"Nagpanchami Utsab"	Srijit Roy	Souvik Chakraborty	February 14, 2025
2	"Bohurupi"	Srijit Roy	Souvik Chakraborty	February 14, 2025
3	"Manasha Mangal Kabyo"	Srijit Roy	Souvik Chakraborty	February 14, 2025
4	"Kaal Nagini"	Srijit Roy	Souvik Chakraborty	February 14, 2025
5	"Behula"	Srijit Roy	Souvik Chakraborty	February 14, 2025
6	"Bish noy, Amrita"	Srijit Roy	Souvik Chakraborty	February 14, 2025
