= Bedroom (film) =

2012 Indian Bengali film

- Film Poster
- Directed by: Mainak Bhaumik
- Written by: Mainak Bhaumik
- Screenplay by: Mainak Bhaumik
- Produced by: Rana Sarkar
- Starring: Rahul Banerjee; Abir Chatterjee; Paoli Dam; Parno Mittra; Ushasie Chakraborty; Rudranil Ghosh; Tanushree Chakraborty; Vikram Chatterjee
- Cinematography: Supriyo Dutta
- Edited by: Shamik Chatterjee
- Music by: Rupam Islam and Allan Ao
- Distributed by: Dag Creative Media
- Release date: 6 January 2012
- Country: India
- Language: Bengali

Bedroom (Bengali: বেডরুম) is a 2012 Indian Bengali drama film directed by Mainak Bhaumik. Bedroom stars Abir Chatterjee, Rudranil Ghosh, Ushasie, Parno Mitra, Paoli Dam, Rahul, Tanushree, Anubroto Basu & others.

== Synopsis ==
Joy, Ananda, and Deb are three friends. Ananda, an I.T. engineer who hails from a middle-class family, is married off to a rich Bengali girl, Priyanka. Priyanka's friend, Ritika maintains a live-in relationship with Joy. On the other hand, Deb is a somewhat successful actor who despises love, relationship, and the idea of marriage, rather wills to fooling around with whoever catches his eyes.

Ananda, despite his determination and honesty, struggles to sustain his work-life balance, thus putting off Priyanka. Joy conducts an acting workshop but cannot land himself in a proper role, leaving Ritika the only source of income of the household. Ritika, a fashion photographer, herself remains devastated not only due to Joy's constant frustration and insecurities but also to her family's pressure to get married as soon as possible.

Joy is met with Tanisha, a prostitute who attends Joy's acting classes. Through conversations, and constant meetings after classes, they develop a rapport, particularly Tanisha as Joy starts to be more open in her presence. Gradually Tanisha expresses her desire to be saved by a man who would accept her past and make her his one and only, by buying her a red shoe from a specific shoe store that she has eyes upon since her arrival in the city.

Ritika also starts a casual fling with a younger university student, who seems to have fallen for her. Meanwhile, Ananda is fired by his company, as he refuses to do a nasty favor in exchange for his promotion. Fearing that his wife might leave him, Ananda continues to leave early as regular in the morning, only to roam around the city till dark. This is eventually discovered by Priyanka and Ritika but they keep that a secret from him.

A reporter, Ipshita Chowdhury, interviews Deb for her Newspaper article. During the interview, they discover they have much in common in their lives as neither believes in love, relationships, and marriage, due to having similar heartbreaks and trust issues induced by their former lovers. Eventually, they engage physically. But due to their own fear of being rejected by the other, they call it a night and gradually separate, causing distress and regret within themselves.

Priyanka is met with a school friend Rajat who has returned from the USA to get married. Ananda, knowing that Rajat was an ex-boyfriend of Priyanka in her teenage years, wants to get in between but resists himself in fear of getting found out. So he rather enters home late night, being drunk. Meanwhile Joy becomes fed up with Ritika and decides to sabotage the relationship through bringing Tanisha in his life. He tells Tanisha to stay in front of the shoe store, signaling that he is ready to accept her in his life. Such action is discovered by Deb and he warns Joy to cut off Tanisha immediately because he cannot risk his friend of being in severe financial crisis. Despite refusing Deb, Joy gives in and disconnects Tanisha from his life by leaving her alone in front of the store. Tanisha realizes the irony, buys the shoe herself and returns home. Meanwhile, Ritika dumps the student after a brief period.

One day, Ananda returns home early and finds that Priyanka is not home. He sees her phone on the table and casually checks through her inbox. He gets irritated of Priyanka and Rajat's texts and suspects his wife of infidelity. After an hour or so, upon his wife's arrival, he confronts her about the texts, only to realize that she intentionally left her phone for Ananda to go through the texts. She also informs him that Rajat lied about getting married, rather he only met Priyanka to get back with her. But Priyanka instantly rejected his advances for definite reasons. She also opens up about Ananda not being truthful to her. She tells him that she has always loved him due to his honesty, determination and his urge to prove his self-worth. Realizing his mistakes, he shames himself and seeks forgiveness from her. Priyanka, in exchange for her mercy, becomes the torchbearer in Ananda's life.

Ananda finally provides the favor his former boss had asked for. He calls for an escort to comfort his boss, who is none other than Tanisha herself.

Two months later, Ananda returns to his old job with an instant promotion. Ritika finally marries Joy, much to Joy's severe discomfort but nonetheless he seems to have accepted it. Deb, on the other hand, decides to remain unmarried for the rest of his life. Priyanka tells Ritika that she is pregnant.

The movie closes with Tanisha being hanged from the ceiling fan, wearing the red shoes she had bought two months earlier.

== Cast ==
- Abir Chatterjee as Ananda
- Rudranil Ghosh as Deb
- Ushashie Chakraborty as Ipshita
- Parno Mittra as Ritika
- Paoli Dam as Priyanka
- Rahul Banerjee as Joy
- Vikram Chatterjee as Rajat
- Tanushree Chakraborty as Tanisha
- Biswanath Basu as Deb's assistant
- Pallavi Chatterjee as Ipshita's Colleague

== Music ==
Rupam Islam and Allan Ao, two members from the Bengali rock band Fossils, wrote the soundtrack for Bedroom.

=== Soundtrack ===
Bedroom

Soundtrack album by Rupam Islam Allan Ao
- Released: 2011
- Genre: Various
- Length: 33:07

No.	Title	Lyrics	Singer(s)	Length
1.	"Aarekta Din"		Shreya Ghoshal	4:58
2.	"Who Am I"		Rupam Islam	5:33
3.	"Bodle Jay"		Babul Supriyo	4:48
4.	"Mayabono Biharini Horini"	Rabindranath Tagore	Somlata Acharyya Chowdhury	3:11
5.	"Dnare Dnare Droom"		Anupam Roy, Sayak Bandyopadhyay	2:36
6.	"Amen"		Rupam Islam	3:53
7.	"Bedroom (Title Track)"		Rupam Islam	8:08
