= Saat Paake Bandha (2010 TV series) =

Indian Bengali TV Serial

- Genre: Drama; Romance
- Screenplay by: Lovely Mukherjee
- Story by: Leena Gangopadhyay
- Directed by: Bijoy Maji
- Starring: Oindrila Sen; Vikram Chatterjee
- Theme music composer: Debjit
- Opening theme: 'Saat Paake Bandha' by Monali Thakur; Emon Chatterjee
- Composer: Prosenjit Mukherjee
- Country of origin: India
- Original language: Bengali
- No. of seasons: 1
- No. of episodes: 956

Production
- Producers: Rajiv Mehra; Susanta Das
- Production location: Kolkata
- Production company: One Plus One

Original release
- Network: Zee Bangla
- Release: 5 July 2010 – 20 July 2013

Saat Paake Bandha is an India and Bengali-language television soap opera that premiered on 5 July 2010, and aired on Bengali Zee Bangla. The show starred Oindrila Sen and Vikram Chatterjee in lead roles.

== Cast ==
- Oindrila Sen as Dustu
- Vikram Chatterjee (before surgery)/ Vivaan Ghosh (after surgery) as Raja / (fake Rohan)

=== Recurring ===
- Rita Koiral as Charu: Shidu's wife; Dipu, Rumi, Munni and Raja's mother
- Partha Sarathi Deb as Shidu, Dipu, Rumi, Munni and Raja's father
- Baisakhi Marjit as Sudeshna: Abhirup's second wife and Dustu's mother
- Santu Mukherjee / Rohit Mukherjee as Abhirup: Sudeshna's husband, Aranya and Dustu's father
- Saswati Guha Thakurta as Abhirup's first wife and Aranya's mother
- Subhrajit Dutta as Aranya: Abhirup's son and Dustu's step-brother
- Manasi Sinha / Namita Chakraborty as Manu: Dustu's caretaker
- Debottam Majumdar as Apu: Dustu's former fiancé
- Sandip Chakraborty as Shidu: Raja's brother
- Lopamudra Sinha as Kakoli: Shidu's wife
- Sahana Sen as Rumi: Raja's sister
- Lovely Maitra as Munni: Raja's sister
- Animesh Bhaduri as Dipu: Raja's brother
- Anindita Sarkar / Piyali Basu as Bisaka: Dipu's wife
- Subho Roy Chowdhury / Sudip Sarkar as Shubo: Munni's husband
- Indrakshi Nag as Megha
- Rumki Chatterjee as Megha's mother
- Prantik Banerjee as Anik / Rohan
- Moumita Gupta as Domoyonti Sen
- Kaushik Banerjee as Domoyonti's husband
- Priya Paul / Sneha Chatterjee as Juiee
- Ambarish Bhattacharya as Bubai
- Rupsa Chatterjee / Sarmistha Acharjee as Rupsha
- Chandraneev Mukherjee as Vijeet
- Debaparna Chakraborty as Tushi
- Manishankar Banerjee as Raja and Apu's maternal uncle
