= Vikram Chatterjee =

Indian actor

- Born: 17 May 1988 (age 38); Kolkata, West Bengal
- Education: City College, Kolkata
- Occupation: Actor
- Notable work: Khoj; Elar Char Adhyay; Ichche Nodee; Saheb Bibi Golaam; Meghnad Badh Rahasya; Phagun Bou; Shohorer Ushnotomo Din E; Pariah; Omorshongi
- Parent(s): Bijoy Chatterjee (Father); Mallika Chatterjee (Mother)

Vikram Chatterjee (/bɪkrɔːm tʃætɑːrjiː/ born 17 May 1988) is an Indian actor who predominantly works in Bengali cinema. He made his silver screen debut in 2012 with a supporting role in Mainak Bhowmik's Bedroom. In the same year he acted in Elar Char Adhyay based on Rabindranath Tagore's last novel "Char Adhyay". In 2013, he participated in the reality show Bigg Boss Bangla as a contestant. Soon after he portrayed supporting roles in Ami Aar Amar Girlfriends, Hoi Choi, Britto and few other films. He gained widespread popularity after playing the lead roles in the daily soaps Ichche Nodee (2015–17) and Phagun Bou (2018-19).

Chatterjee's acting skills in Shaheb Bibi Golaam in 2016 and Meghnad Badh Rahasya in 2017 earned him critical acclaim. Khoj in 2017 marked his debut in a lead role. After a brief setback due to the Sonika Chauhan controversy, he made comeback with Shohorer Ushnotomo Din E in 2023. Thereafter, he has starred in films including Pariah (2024), Surjo (2024), Omorshongi (2025) and Durgapur Junction (2025), which have been critically acclaimed as well have achieved lukewarm commercial success. Pariah earned him a nomination for the Best Actor at the 8th Filmfare Awards Bangla.

== Early life and education ==
Vikram was born in Kolkata, West Bengal to father Bijoy Chatterjee and mother Mallika Chatterjee. He spent a major part of childhood in Sulekha, Jadavpur. He completed his graduation and alma mater from the City College, Kolkata.

== Media ==
In 2017, Calcutta Times ranked him as the 5th Most Desirable Man of Tollywood.

== Filmography ==
Key
†	Denotes films that have not yet been released

Year	Film	Character	Director	Note	Ref.
2012	Bedroom	Rajat	Mainak Bhaumik	Marked his debut in Bengali Film Industry	
2012	Elar Char Adhyay	Atin	Bappaditya Bandopadhyay		
2012	3 Kanya	Nancy's husband	Agnidev Chatterjee	Cameo role	
2013	Ami Aar Amar Girlfriends	Deep	Mainak Bhaumik		
2013	Mistake	Neel	S.K. Bangalore		
2013	Hoi Choi	Nalok	Debarati Gupta		
2014	Ami Shudhu Cheyechi Tomay	Joy	Ashok Pati, Anonno Mamun	Indo-Bangladesh joint production	
2014	Gogoler Kirti	Joy	Pompi Ghosh Mukherjee		
2014	Britto	Roni	Surajit Dhar		
2015	Ajana Batash	Sandy	Anjan Das		
2016	Saheb Bibi Golaam	Zico	Pratim D. Gupta		
2016	Aatish	Aatish	Paroma Neotia		
2017	Khoj	Sayan Bose	Arka Ganguly	Marked his first film in a lead role	
2017	Meghnad Badh Rahasya	Wrik Bose	Anik Dutta		
2022	Kuler Achaar	Pritam	Sudeep Das		
2023	Shesh Pata	Sounak	Atanu Ghosh		
2023	Shohorer Ushnotomo Din E	Ritoban	Aritra Sen		
2024	Pariah	Lubdhak Chatterjee	Tathagata Mukherjee		
2024	Surjo	Surjo	Siladitya Moulik		
2025	Omorshongi	Anurag	Dibya Chatterjee		
2025	Durgapur Junction	Soumya	Arindam Bhattacharya		
2025	Raas	Somnath	Tathagata Mukherjee		
2025	Mrigaya: The Hunt	Animesh	Avirup Ghosh		
2026	Pariah 2 †	Lubdhak Chatterjee	Tathagata Mukherjee		
2026	Memory X †	TBA	Tathagata Mukherjee	Will mark his debut in the Hindi Film Industry	

== Web series ==
Year	Series	OTT Platform	Character	Director	Note	Ref.
2018	Famously Filmfare Bangla	MX Player	Himself as a guest in the talk show	—N/a	Talk Show	
2019	Paanch Phoron	Hoichoi	Arindam Mitra	Suman Mukherjee		
2020	Dure Thaka Kachher Manush	YouTube	Deepto	Shahrear Polock	Short film	
2020	Pabitra Puppies	Hoichoi	Arnab	Debaloy Bhattacharya		
2020	Tansener Tanpura (Season 1)	Hoichoi	Alap Mitra	Soumik Chatterjee		
2020	Tansener Tanpura (Season 2)	Hoichoi	Alap Mitra	Soumik Chatterjee		
2021	Rudrabinar Obhishaap (Season 1)	Hoichoi	Alap Mitra	Joydeep Mukherjee		
2022	Rudrabinar Obhishaap (Season 2)	Hoichoi	Alap Mitra	Joydeep Mukherjee		
2023	Roktokorobi	ZEE5	Satyaki	Sayantan Ghoshal		
2026	Taarkataa	ZEE5	Agni	Samik Roy Choudhury	Production debut	

== Other works ==
=== Soap operas ===
Year	Soap opera	Character	Channel	Note	Ref.
2010 - 2011	Saat Paake Bandha	Raja	Zee Bangla	Marked his debut in Bengali entertainment industry; Debut soap opera	
2013	Sokhi	Ayan	Star Jalsha		
2014 - 2017	Jamai Raja	Police officer	Zee TV	Cameo role; Marked his debut in Hindi soap opera	
2014	Byomkesh	Bilash Mallick	ETV Bangla		
2015	Doli Armaano Ki	Yash Singhania	Zee TV	Hindi soap opera; Cameo role	
2015 - 2017	Ichche Nodee	Dr Anuraag Banerjee aka Tatan	Star Jalsha		
2018 - 2019	Phagun Bou	Dr Ayandeep Ghosh aka Roddur	Star Jalsha		

=== Television shows ===
Year	Show	Character	Channel	Note	Ref.
2013	Bigg Boss Bangla	Himself as a contestant	ETV Bangla		
2014	Zee Cine Star Ki Khoj	Himself as a participant	Zee TV	Reality show; Finished the show as the first Runner-up	
2015	Aahat (Season 6)	Rohan	Sony TV	Lead role in the 27th episode of Season 6	
2021	Dance Bangla Dance	Host	Zee Bangla	Season 11; Hosted along with Ankush Hazra	
2025	Dosh Dine Dosh Lakh	Host	Zee Bangla Sonar	Host along with Oindrila Sen	

=== Advertisements ===
- Anjali Jewellers directed by Anik Dutta
- Snapdeal
- Mahindra Centuro
- Vivo India directed by Vinil Mathew
- Shoppers Stop
- Amazon

== Awards and nominations ==
Year	Work	Award	Category	Result	Ref.
2011	Saat Paake Bandha	Big Rising Star Awards	Best Actor Male TV	Nominated	
2011	Saat Paake Bandha	Zee Bangla Gourav Awards	Best Actor Male TV	Nominated	
2011	Saat Paake Bandha	Zee Bangla Gourav Samman	Best On Screen Pair	Won	
2011	Saat Paake Bandha	Tele Samman	Best Actor Male TV	Nominated	
2012	Elar Char Adhyay	Bengal Youth Awards	Best Debut Male	Won	
2016	Ichche Nodee	Tele Cine Awards	Best Actor Male TV	Won	
2016	Ichche Nodee	Tele Academy Awards	Best Actor Male TV	Won	
2016	Ichche Nodee	Tele Academy Awards	Best On Screen Pair TV	Won	
2016	Ichche Nodee	Star Jalsha Parivaar Award	Priyo Notun Sadashya (Purush)	Won	
2016	Ichche Nodee	Star Jalsha Parivaar Award	Priya Bor	Won	
2017	Shaheb Bibi Golaam	WBFJA Awards	Best Actor in a Negative Role	Nominated	
2017	Shaheb Bibi Golaam	IBFA Awards	Best Actor in a Negative Role	Nominated	
2017	Ichche Nodee	Tele Academy Awards	Most Popular Actor TV	Won	
2017	Ichche Nodee	Star Jalsha Parivaar Award	Style Icon of The Year (Male)	Won	
2017	Ichche Nodee	Tele Cine Awards	Best Actor Male TV	Nominated	
2018	Phagun Bou	Bengal Youth Icon	Youth Icon Of The Year	Won	
2019	Phagun Bou	Tele Academy Awards	Best Onscreen Pair	Won	
2019	Phagun Bou	Tele Academy Awards	Best Soap Opera of The Year	Won	
2020	Tansener Tanpura	Hoichoi Awards 2020	Performance of The Year (Male)	Won	
2022	Dance Bangla Dance	Zee Bangla Sonar Sansar Award 2022	Priyo Sadashya (Debut in Non Fiction)	Won	
2022	Rudrabinar Obhishap (Season 1)	Hoichoi Awards 2021	Most loved character of Hoichoi (with "Rupsha Chatterjee")	Won	
2024	Shesh Pata	7th Filmfare Awards Bangla	Filmfare Award Bangla for Best Supporting Actor	Nominated	
2025	Pariah	8th Filmfare Awards Bangla	Filmfare Award Bangla for Best Actor	Nominated	

== Controversy ==
On 29 April 2017 at 3.30 am Vikram and his friend Sonika Chauhan a model, actress and a TV Host, was driving back home from a party and met with an accident at Rashbehari Avenue connector near Lake mall. Both were taken to the hospital where Sonika was declared dead by the doctors due to severe head injuries and Vikram was injured. He was treated at Ruby General Hospital and was later discharged on 4 May 2017. A case for culpable homicide under the Indian Penal Code and for driving under the influence under the Motor Vehicles Act was filed against Vikram Chatterjee. Initially he was absconding after the police had charged him with culpable homicide not amounting to murder as well as rash and negligent driving. Later, he was arrested by the Kolkata Police on 6 July. Thereafter a court granted him bail on 26 July 2017.

In 2022, an Alipore city court rejected Vikram Chatterjee’s request for the temporary release of his passport to travel to London.
