= Hoichoi: The Ruckus =

2013 Bengali drama film

Hoichoi: The Ruckus is a Bengali drama film directed by Debarati Gupta and produced by Dilip Choudhury. This film was released on 12 July 2013 under the banner of Ganapati Entertainments.

== Plot ==
Struggling theatre actress Piyal becomes frustrated without getting recognition. She and her friends perform street theatre and decide to create a new group Hoi Choi. Two more performers, Aban and Nalok, join their group. Unpleasant truth reveals about the politics of group theatre.

== Cast ==
- Paoli Dam as Piyal
- Rahul Banerjee as Aban
- Priyanaka Sarkar as Tupur
- Rudranil Ghosh
- Vikram Chatterjee as Nalok
- Shekhar Das as Charan
