= Taarkata (2026 TV series) =

2026 Indian Bengali-language action thriller web series

- তারকাটা
- Genre: Crime thriller; Action; Dark comedy; Psychological thriller
- Written by: Soumit Deb
- Directed by: Samik Roy Choudhury
- Starring: Vikram Chatterjee; Priyanka Sarkar; Satyam Bhattacharya; Meiyang Chang; Debesh Roychoudhury
- Country of origin: India
- Original language: Bengali
- No. of episodes: 7

Production
- Producers: Avinaba Ghosh; Vikram Chatterjee
- Cinematography: Prosenjit Koley
- Editor: Sanglap Bhowmik
- Production company: Vikram Chatterjee Films

Original release
- Network: ZEE5 (Bangla)
- Release: 15 June 2026

Taarkata is a 2026 Indian Bengali-language action crime web series directed by Samik Roy Chowdhury and produced by Avinaba Ghosh, and Vikram Chatterjee under his production banner Vikram Chatterjee Films. It stars Chatterjee alongside Priyanka Sarkar, Satyam Bhattacharya, Meiyang Chang, and Debesh Roychoudhury.

== Plot ==
Agni is a former police officer who returns to his hometown after years away. A mysterious death pulls him into an investigation tied to a past he had tried to leave behind. As the case develops, the lives of the other characters prove connected to the same history. Chhanda works in a field where death is routine but finds the emotional reality of it harder to manage. Dodo passes for modern and open-minded while hiding a violent streak.

== Cast ==
- Vikram Chatterjee as Agni, a former police officer
- Priyanka Sarkar as Chhanda
- Satyam Bhattacharya as Bumba Bagchi
- Meiyang Chang as Dodo
- Debesh Roychoudhury as Bose
- Joydeep Mukherjee as Chowdhury
- Ayush Das as Tintin
- Sushmita Roy as Sunaina
- Aishwarya Paul as Riya
- Tathagata Mukherjee as Rahul Chowdhury
- Korak Samanta as Kuber

== Production ==
=== Background ===
Vikram Chatterjee had worked as an actor in Bengali cinema since his debut in 2012. He told t2online that producing was something he had planned for later: "Getting into production was something I would have done eventually, maybe a couple of years down the line. Bangla ZEE5 asked if I wanted to produce the show. Since they showed faith in me, I decided to take it up and execute it now."

Chatterjee had wanted to work with director Samik Roy Chowdhury for some time. "I've seen his work and really like the way he thinks and executes ideas," he said. Roy Chowdhury described the series' central concern as memory and the decisions it drives: "At its core, it is about the emotional scars which compel a human being to travel on the path of revenge. Every character is hiding something, and every revelation changes the course of the story."

=== Casting ===
Meiyang Chang, a singer and television host, had not previously appeared in a Bengali-language production. His casting in Taarkata was one of the aspects Chatterjee highlighted when discussing the series' mix of talent.

Priyanka Sarkar debuted in Bengali cinema in 2005 and had her first major commercial success with Chirodini Tumi Je Amar (2008). Srijit Mukherji, primarily known as a Bengali film director, appears in the series in an acting role.

=== Music ===
The song "Bheshe Jai" (transl. Drift Away) was released at a cast and crew event on 8 June 2026. Soumit Deb wrote and composed it; Kuntal De produced the track and played guitar. Koushik Chakraborty and Kuntal De sang the vocals. GJ Storm handled the mix and master.

== Release ==
The first look was released in April 2026. The official trailer followed on 30 May 2026. "Bheshe Jai" was released at a promotional event on 8 June 2026.
