= Durgapur Junction =

2025 Indian Bengali medico-thriller film

- Theatrical release poster
- Directed by: Arindam Bhattacharya
- Screenplay by: Arindam Bhattacharya
- Story by: Arindam Bhattacharya
- Produced by: Arindam Bhattacharya
- Starring: Vikram Chatterjee; Swastika Mukherjee; Ekavali Khanna
- Cinematography: Prosenjit Chowdhury
- Edited by: Sujay Datta Ray
- Music by: Soum-Sree-Tiru
- Production company: Dreamliner Entertainment
- Distributed by: SSR Cinemas
- Release date: 25 April 2025
- Running time: 100 minutes
- Country: India
- Language: Bengali

Durgapur Junction is a 2025 Indian Bengali-language medico-crime thriller film written, produced and directed by Arindam Bhattacharya under the banner of Dreamliner Entertainment. The film stars Swastika Mukherjee, Vikram Chatterjee and Ekavali Khanna in the lead roles.

The film is based on the Chicago Tylenol murders and set in the backdrop of Durgapur. Soum-Sree-Tiru worked as the music director of the film while Salini Mitra handled the art direction. Prosenjit Chowdhury did the cinematography while Sujay Datta Ray handled the editing. The film was released in the theatres on 25 April 2025.

== Synopsis ==
The film begins with a series of unnatural deaths among middle-aged men in Durgapur. After the local police failed to find the root cause of the serial deaths, they dismissed them as heart attacks. But the case is then handed over to the CID. Soumya Sen leads the investigation, under the supervision of his senior, Deputy Superintendent Gouri Singh. Initially, they struggle to find a link between the victims, who didn't have any connection with each other.

After further investigation, they find that the deaths are occurring from the consumption of a seemingly harmless vitamin capsule, which has been laced with deadly doses of potassium cyanide. In the meantime, journalist Ushashie delves deep into the matter despite facing objections from her editor and receiving threats from criminals. She finds a vital clue regarding the case that made her cross paths with Soumya Sen. The investigation further delves into the core of the case, which reveals that the syndicate racket runs deep beyond a simple medicine scam.

== Cast ==
- Vikram Chatterjee as Soumyo Sen, CID officer
- Swastika Mukherjee as Ushashie, a journalist
- Ekavali Khanna as Gouri Singh, Deputy Superintendent of Police
- Rajdeep Sarkar
- Pradeep Dhar
- Sreemoyee Majumdar

== Production ==
=== Development and casting ===
The title of the film was revealed in June 2023. The film is based on the Chicago Tylenol murders in the United States. The director has made the film in the backdrop of Durgapur.

The motion poster of the film was released on 21 February 2025. Durgapur Junction marked the collaboration between Vikram and Swastika, eight years after Saheb Bibi Golaam (2016).

=== Pre-production ===
Initially, the role of police officer was given to Swastika, and the role of journalist was given to Vikram. But later, their characters were interchanged upon mutual interest and agreement between Vikram and Swastika. Vikram wanted to play a police officer because he hadn't played one since Khoj. On the other hand, Swastika did a police role in Khoj, so she did not want to repeat the same kind of role. She said in an interview that she agreed to the script because "I am personally a fan of thrillers, and besides, thrillers are highly appreciated and loved by audience these days."

=== Filming ===
"I am happy that I got to play a journalist’s character—an investigative journalist—after 15 years. I’m even more excited that Ushashie is not a grieving mother mourning her child’s death or disappearance, as I have often portrayed in the past."

— Swastika Mukherjee, sharing her experience of working in Durgapur Junction

Vikram Chatterjee mentioned in an interview that he and Swastika Mukherjee had improvised a lot on the spot, "both in terms of the script and dialogue, to make it more powerful and impactful." He also added that an action choreographer was appointed at the last moment to help them shoot the climax sequence.

The filming started in July 2023 and was completed in December 2023. The last leg of the shooting was done in different parts of Kolkata. Major parts of the film have been shot in Durgapur. A few additional scenes have been shot in Bolpur.

== Soundtrack ==
Durgapur Junction

Soundtrack album by Soum-Sree-Tiru
- Released: 2025
- Genre: Film soundtrack
- Length: 17:05
- Language: Bengali
- Label: Zee Music Bangla

The music of the film has been composed by Soum-Sree-Tiru, while the lyrics have been penned by Saikat Chattapadhya, Kaustav KC, Cizzy (Rounak Chakrabarty) and Manidipa Singha.

The first song "Cyanide" was released on 19 March 2025. The second song "Ami Oporadhi" was released on 2 April 2025. The third song "Rap-O-Benachiti" was released on 22 April 2025. The fourth song "Aaji Jhorer Ratey" was released on 5 May 2025. "Aaji Jhorer Ratey" has been adapted from an eponymous Rabindra Sangeet by Rabindranath Tagore.

Track listing
No.	Title	Lyrics	Singer(s)	Length
1.	"Cyanide"	Saikat Chattapadhya, Kaustav KC, Cizzy (Rounak Chakrabarty)	Rupam Islam, Soum-Sree-Tiru, Saikat Chattapadhya	4:27
2.	"Ami Oporadhi"	Manidipa Singha	Iman Chakraborty, Soum-Sree-Tiru, Manidipa Singha	4:10
3.	"Rap-O-Benachiti"	Cizzy (Rounak Chakrabarty)	Cizzy (Rounak Chakrabarty), Soum-Sree-Tiru	2:42
4.	"Aaji Jhorer Ratey"	Rabindranath Tagore	Ujjaini Mukherjee, Shruti Gupta, Soum-Sree-Tiru	5:46
Total length:				17:05

== Release ==
Initially, the filming was scheduled to be completed by mid-2023 and the film was planned to be released in December 2023. But since the filming was completed late, in December 2023, the release date was postponed to 2024. Due to certain production issues, the film was postponed for another year. The film was finally released in the theatres on 25 April 2025.

== Marketing ==
The teaser was released at an event in Kolkata on 27 March 2025. The trailer of the film was released on 15 April 2025.

== Reception ==
=== Critical reception ===
Arkapravo Das of The Times of India rated the film 2.5 out of 5 stars and wrote "What could have been a layered exploration of corruption and human motives devolves into a rushed, disjointed narrative." He praised the music of the film and the performances of Swastika Mukherjee and Vikram Chatterjee. But, he bemoaned that the abrupt twists in the film and below par character exploration undermines the film's potential. Subhadrika Sen of Indulge Express reviewed the film and opined "Durgapur Junction is an overall package where the hard work of hundreds on and behind the screen coincides to create a thrilling adventure for the audience on the silver screen." She applauded the thrill factor throughout the film, the food for thought given to the audience, the pace of the narrative, the climax, the music and the performances of Swastika, Vikram and Ekavali.

Agnivo Niyogi of The Telegraph reviewed the film and noted "Durgapur Junction aspires to be a slick, small-town thriller but struggles with storytelling." He criticized the impalpable tension in the film, the weak script and the easily predictable twists but applauded the screen time between Vikram and Swastika, their individual performances, the editing and the cinematography. Aditi Basu Roy of Anandabazar Patrika rated the film 7/10 stars and bemoaned the weak screenplay, the unexplained loopholes in the plot and the weak direction but applauded the acting of the lead cast, the cinematography, music, background score and the editing.

Arpan Das of Sangbad Pratidin reviewed the film and wrote "Durgapur Junction could have been more tense by making the investigation scenes more detailed while maintaining the fast pace. But still, the thrill factor in the second half makes up for the shortcomings in the film." He particularly applauded the mysterious and elemental cinematography by Prosenjit Chowdhury, the performance of Swastika and Vikram in their respective roles, the differing contrast throughout the film but bemoaned the poor character background development for Vikram's character. Subhodeep Bandyopadhyay of The Wall rated the film 7.5/10 stars and opined "The trump card for the film is the varying shades of Swastika's character." He praised Chatterjee's improved direction, Vikram's screen presence, Swastika's layered performance, the physical and social nudity shown in the film, the music and lyrics, the cinematography, the editing, the climax and the art direction. But she criticized the over-the-top unreal storyline in certain parts.
