= Chobiwala =

2026 Indian film

- Official poster of the film
- Directed by: Shuvrojyoti Bappa
- Written by: Santanu Nath
- Produced by: Sarbjit Ghosh
- Starring: Rahul Banerjee; Debolina Dutta
- Edited by: Sayantan Nag
- Music by: Soumyarit
- Production company: A4J Films
- Distributed by: SSR Cinemas Pvt. Ltd.
- Release date: 24 July 2026
- Running time: 122 minutes
- Country: India
- Language: Bengali

Chobiwala (Note: transl. Photographer) is a 2026 Indian drama film written by Santanu Nath and directed by Bappa. The plot revolves around a photographer who longs capture life in his frame, but is only appointed to photograph corpses. The film stars Rahul Banerjee (Note: Posthumous release) and Debolina Dutta in the lead. The movie received predominantly negative reviews.

== Cast ==
- Rahul Banerjee as Vishwakarma
- Debolina Dutta as Mala, Vishwakarma's wife
- Rana Basu Thakur
- Santanu Nath
- Rimmi Deb
- Sreelekha Mitra (Cameo)
