= Taan (film) =

- Directed by: Mukul Roy Chowdhury
- Screenplay by: Shibhashish Bhandopadhyay
- Story by: Al Mahmud
- Produced by: Surajit Hari; Subrata Das
- Starring: Rituparna Sengupta; Debolina Dutta; Chandan Sen; Kaushik Sen; Rajesh Sharma
- Cinematography: Monoj mishra
- Edited by: Arghyakamal Mitra
- Music by: Indradeep Dasgupta; Anup Mukherjee
- Release date: 21 February 2014
- Country: India
- Language: Bengali

Taan is a 2014 Indian Bengali drama film, written and directed by Mukul Roy Chowdhury. The film is based on the life of prostitutes and human trafficking.

== Cast ==
- Rituparna Sengupta as Sundari
- Debolina Dutta as Meghna
- Chandan Sen as Abed Mia
- Kaushik Sen as Ranjot
- Rajesh Sharma as Jahangir Sardar
- Sumanto Chattopadhyay as Saju
- Debdut Ghosh
- Nandini Chatterjee
- Pamela Singh Bhutoria
