= Pariah (2024 film) =

2024 Indian Bengali action thriller film

- Directed by: Tathagata Mukherjee
- Screenplay by: Antara Banerjee; Tathagata Mukherjee
- Story by: Tathagata Mukherjee
- Dialogues by: Tathagata Mukherjee
- Produced by: Prateek Chakravorty; Avinaba Ghosh
- Starring: Vikram Chatterjee; Angana Roy; Sreelekha Mitra; Ambarish Bhattacharya
- Cinematography: Uttaran De
- Edited by: Amir Mondal
- Music by: Ranajoy Bhattacharjee
- Production companies: Pramod Films; Dreams On Sale
- Release date: 9 February 2024
- Country: India
- Language: Bengali

Pariah Volume 1: Every Street Dog Has a Name or simply Pariah (transl. Pye-dog) is a 2024 Bengali-language action thriller film written and directed by Tathagata Mukherjee. It stars Vikram Chatterjee in the lead role and the movie is about raising a voice against the injustice done to stray animals. This film was released on OTT platform Hoichoi on 12 July 2024.

Pariah is a name collectively given to the Pye-dog. This film was released on 9 February 2024. A sequel named "Pariah Volume 2: Rise of Kalbhairav" has been announced, which is set to release in 2025.

== Plot ==
An old lady, who runs a small restaurant, feeds some street dogs everyday with care. However, a promoter wants her and her dogs to leave the site for him to build the gate of his building. However, when she takes the help of an NGO, run by a lady named Sanghamitra, goes to the police, the old lady is murdered and the street dogs are taken away. A mysterious, reclusive but short - tempered man with no name, who silently works at a nearby factory, used to come everyday at the restaurant and feed a specific baby dog, gets violent seeing this incident. He, with the help of Kamalini, a NGO girl, decides to move around and find out the dog who goes missing from the site.

As they move up the ladder, M. N. Sharma, an influential man, who, on one hand, participates in different dog-related healthy activities, and on other hand, tortures and sells off the "unhealthy" dogs, gets on the hitlist of the man. The man first kills off the promoter and then punishes a man who harasses his pet dog at home as well as harasses Kamalini. He moves on to a peddler and kills him after caging him in a dog's cage. He does all this after donning a dog's mask.

Eventually, when he tries to kill off Sharma, he gets into the hands of the police and finally lands on the yard of the butcher, who had already kidnapped Kamalini. The butcher cuts off one hand of hers. Enraged, the protagonist kills the butcher and the other men at work.

He goes on to confront Sanghamitra, who confesses on helping Sharma in a mafia racket, which is headed by a powerful politician. When asked about the baby dog's whereabouts, Sanghamitra says that alive stray dogs are probably supplied to North East India from Kolkata. She gives him the contact details of a person named Tamang, related to this racket. Through the man's dialogues, her eventual death on his hands is hinted.

All meat-related hotels and restaurants are sealed. The police officer investigating the case, who had gotten the proof for charging the man and then sending him to the butcher, had presented the protagonist's photographs and evidences. When his photograph is shown to Kamalini, she willfully denies of knowing him.

The entire network fails at getting up to the protagonist. The politician rebukes them and asks for the photograph. Upon seeing the photograph, the politician gets shocked and terrified. He runs to make a call to someone above him and informs him the return of the man. He pulls out an old file named "Operation Pariah" is opened, where the protagonist's name is revealed as Lubdhak Chatterjee, an ex-army officer whose has been declared "deceased". Chatterjee gears up with his collection of guns and weaponry, to move to Arunachal Pradesh.

In the end and post-credit scenes, it is revealed that the man, who always used to pull Chatterjee's leg and disturb him, had taken up the baby dog as his pet. He takes a selfie with the dog and sends it to Chatterjee through WhatsApp.

== Cast ==
- Vikram Chatterjee as Lubdhok Chatterjee
- Angana Roy as Kamalini
- Sreelekha Mitra as NGO owner
- Ambarish Bhattacharya as Mr. Sharma
- Shahir Raj
- Soumya Mukherjee as Nanda
- Tapati Munsi
- Debashish Roy
- Loknath Dey
- Debaprasad Halder
- Bimal Giri
- Soumik Hazra

== Production ==
=== Announcement ===
The film was officially announced on 5 November 2022 with a motion poster. It garnered attention for its unique topic.

=== Filming ===
Most of the filming has been done in parts of Kolkata. It was reported that while rehearsing for an action scene, Vikram broke his small toe of left foot. After recovery, he continued the shooting. For fitting in the role, he also went through rigorous mixed martial-arts training for 3 months. He also went through a tight gym schedule of 6 months to shed off excess fat and develop a chiselled body.

=== Marketing ===
The teaser was released on 3 January 2024 on Pluto Music. The official trailer was released on 23 January on Zee Music Company YouTube channel, with Jeet as the chief guest at the trailer release event.

== Music ==
Pariah

Soundtrack album by Ranajoy Bhattacharjee
- Released: 16 January 2024
- Recorded: 2023
- Genre: Feature film soundtrack
- Length: 18:11
- Language: Bengali
- Label: Zee Music Bangla

Official audio
- Pariah - Full Album on YouTube

The music is composed by Ranajoy Bhattacharjee. The lyrics are written by Ritam Sen and Tathagata Mukherjee.

Track listing
No.	Title	Lyrics	Singer(s)	Length
1.	"Pariah Anthem"	Ritam Sen	Sonu Nigam	4:00
2.	"Atotayi"	Ritam Sen	Ranajoy Bhattacharjee	5:01
3.	"Bhalobasar Naam (Female)"	Tathagata Mukherjee	Somlata Acharyya Chowdhury	4:29
4.	"Bhalobasar Naam (Male)"	Tathagata Mukherjee	Ranajoy Bhattacharjee	4:41
Total length:				18:11

== Release ==
The film was theatrically released on 9 February 2024.

== Reception ==
Sandipta Bhanja of the Hindustan Times rated the film 2.5 out of 5 stars and wrote "Despite having a good vision, the film fails in its execution." She praised the acting of the whole cast, Vikram's transformation and the action sequences but criticised the director's inability to properly combine a social message and the elements of a commercial potboiler.

Kusumika Das of Times Now rated the film 3.5 out of 5 stars and reviewed the film on a positive note praising the strong message in the film, performance of the cast, action sequences and a gripping storyline but also criticised the overwhelming amount of violence.
