= Ichche Nodee =

Indian television series

- Promotional Image of the Series
- Genre: Drama; Romance
- Created by: Magic Moments Motion Pictures
- Written by: Leena Gangopadhyay
- Directed by: Saibal Banerjee; Sujit Pyne
- Starring: Solanki Roy; Vikram Chatterjee; Sritama Bhattacharjee
- Opening theme: "Ichchenodi" by Somchanda
- Composer: Debojyoti Mishra
- Country of origin: India
- Original language: Bengali
- No. of episodes: 712

Production
- Producers: Leena Gangopadhyay; Saibal Banerjee
- Production locations: Kolkata; North Bengal
- Running time: 20 minutes (approx.)
- Production company: Magic Moments Motion Pictures

Original release
- Network: Star Jalsha
- Release: 15 June 2015 – 28 May 2017

Ichche Nodee, also spelled as Ichchenodi (English: A wish fulfilling river) is a Bengali television soap opera that premiered on 15 June 2015 on Star Jalsha and streams digitally on JioHotstar. Produced by Saibal Banerjee and Leena Gangopadhyay under Magic Moments Motion Pictures, it stars Vikram Chatterjee and Solanki Roy.

It was written by Leena Gangopadhyay. Ichche Nodee features Sritama Bhattacharjee in a negative role, Aishwarya Sen in a negative role later positive, and Chandan Sen and Laboni Sarkar in pivotal roles. After running for almost two years, the show ended on 28 May 2017, after airing 712 episodes.

== Plot ==
Ichchenodi is a story of sibling rivalry set within the premise of a love triangle. Ichhenodi basically revolves around a story of two sisters, Meghla and Adrija, and how they entangle themselves in a relationship with their love interest, Anurag.

Meghla, who finds the essence of her life in music, is fond of her elder sister Adrija, and loves her above anyone else. The sisters get caught up in a love triangle making their life go upside down. Meghla is proud of her elder sister Adrija as she is a smart, beautiful girl, who is a topper as well when it comes to study. However, Adrija despises her since childhood and hates her after she discovers that Meghla is not her own sister but adopted. Chandan loves both Meghla and Adrija equally while Mahua, Chandan's wife loves Adrija more since she is their own daughter and Megha is adoptive. Chandan is proud of Adrija for being a topper but he also supports Meghla's passion for singing and wants her to become an established singer. Adrija begins to love Anurag madly but Anurag falls in love with the simple and docile Meghla, and her passion for music. Meghla refuses him and tries to convince him to marry Adrija but circumstances compel them to marry each other. Adrija creates many misunderstandings to destroy the marital life of Meghla and Anurag. Chandan tries his best to reform Adrija but Adrija pretends to be innocent. Chandan tries strict measures and warnings but nothing seems to work. Adrija even tried to create misunderstanding between Chandan and Meghla but instead their relationship became stronger. Chandan gives Adrija a final warning and says that he will disown her if she continues like this. Adrija still doesn't seem to change.

Adrija is finally successful in making Meghla leave Anurag's house after unlimited misunderstandings. Anurag's mother Malobika trusts Adrija and misunderstands Meghla. Chandan supports Meghla and stands beside her even when everyone is against her. Adrija feeds false stories and emotionally manipulates a depressed Meghla to send divorce papers to Anurag. However after sending the divorce papers Meghla tries to kill herself. Chandan is devastated and blames Anurag and his family. Anurag is extremely guilty and apologies to Meghla along with his family for misunderstanding her. Once Meghla recovers she reveals how adrija emotionally manipulated her and said countless lies to make her feel worthless and sign the divorce papers. Depressed and frustrated Chandan disowns Adrija. Anurag and his family apologies to Meghla and Meghla decides to stay with them. Adrija collaborated with her college friend Subhankar and planned to character assassinate Meghla and kill her. But eventually she fails as Subhankar repents. Chandan and Anurag's cousin Piklu reveals the truth and Chandan gets Adrija and Subhankar arrested. Chandan motivates Meghla to be a strong person but he is depressed for Adrija. Anurag and Meghla face issues due to the aftermath of the incident but eventually reconciles. Later Anurag's distant relative Nandini creates countless problems as apparently she can't see anyone happy. But still Anurag and Meghla's love wins.

After few months Adrija is bailed out by her parents. Adrija seems depressed so Chandan and Mahua takes her for a trip and constantly motivates her to start her life afresh. Anurag and Meghla coincidentally arrives at the same place for their honeymoon. Coincidentally Adrija and Anurag meets and Adrija unleashes her wrath on Anurag. Out of frustration, she pushes Anurag from a cliff, who is then saved by Tua, also a passionate singer. Anurag loses his memory in the accident and is named "Vikram" by Tua and her family. Tua starts loving Vikram, without knowing his past. Adrija now marries Piklu and enters his family to torture Meghla and makes her life hell by instigating Malobika against her, rendering Meghla responsible for Anurag's supposed death and portrays Meghla as a cheap and characterless girl in the eyes of the family members. Nandini helps Adrija in isolating Meghla. A distraught and lonely Meghla finds solace in music and is pacified by her Guru Maa, who turns out to be her own biological mother. Also Chandan constantly supports and motivates Meghla. She soon finds out that Anurag is alive and after many obstacles, they finally reunite (as Anurag's memory returns) on the day of Anurag and Tua's marriage. Anurag reveals how Adrija tried to kill him but except Anurag's elder brother Bumba and his wife Kajori, everyone else thinks that Anurag is misunderstanding Adrija. Meghla despises Adrija after hearing what she did to Anurag. She decides to break all relations with her and Chandan rejects Adrija as his daughter. But Malobika blames Meghla for not informing her about Anurag being alive and thinks that she is an opportunist.

Tua along with her aunt, Sharmistha then join forces with Adrija to separate Meghla from Anurag. On the other hand Meghla turns into a strong individual who has learnt to take stands for herself and speak the truth when required. Anurag and Kajori strongly supports Meghla's change. After Adrija's instigation, Tua and Sharmistha file a case against Anurag, accusing him of deceit and polygamy, but they fail due to the intervention of Adv. Shubhalakshmi, an experienced lawyer. Meghla also helps her to mend her broken relationship with her estranged husband, Adv. Anweshan. Malobika realise her mistakes and apologies to Meghla. Shattered and ashamed of her deeds, Tua changes herself and becomes a loyal confidante to Meghla, despite Anurag's initial reluctance. Sharmistha also repents and reforms herself. Meghla, Anurag and the banerjees asks Adrija to leave the house but Adrija threatens to use her woman rights. Chandan legally disowns her and decides to collect all evidence against her and fight a legal battle. Seeing Meghla alone in the house Adrija goes desperate and tries to stab her but Anurag saves Meghla. Adrija declares to everyone and the police that she will kill definitely kill Meghla one day. Adrija gets arrested while Chandan is depressed to see his daughter behaving like this.

Adrija flees from police custody and takes the alias of "Mallika Dasgupta" to hide herself from the public eye. Deep Dasgupta, husband of the real Mallika (who is now dead), promises to help Adrija without knowledge of her true intentions. Soon Meghla gets pregnant and everyone in the family become happy. But their happiness is short-lived as Adrija kills Meghla's unborn baby while trying to kill her. A devastated Anurag blames Meghla for everything and asks for a separation. Meghla, unable to bear Anurag's indifference, files for divorce, and soon, their divorce happens. Meghla restarts her singing career, while Deep helps Chandan to get Adrija arrested. Anurag decides to move to the United States. and spends a night with Meghla before his departure. Meghla gets pregnant again but decides to tell nobody about her prospective baby.

=== 2 years later ===
A widowed Malobika misses Anurag and Meghla's presence in the family. Mimi, Anurag's elder cousin sister, returns home, as she promised to Anurag to take over the responsibilities of the Banerjee family in his absence, and also becomes a strong emotional support to Meghla. Meghla, who is now a famous playback singer, raises her son (with Anurag), namely Roddur single-handedly. Adrija returns in Piklu's life after her release from jail and consequent, change in disposition. She soon becomes pregnant and transforms into a good-hearted person who cares for Piklu and his family. She restores her love towards Meghla and like others, also wants Meghla and Anurag's reunion. Chandan forgives Adrija. Anurag becomes a famous playback singer known as "AB" in order to get close to Meghla. Lastly, Mimi and Sanjoy, Pagla Ghora (Anurag's uncle) and Shabnam get married. Meghla and Anurag too finally reunite and take care of the family and Roddur together. Adrija and Piklu too have a baby girl; and everything ends well for all

== Cast ==
=== Main ===
- Solanki Roy as Meghla Banerjee (née Sen) – An aspiring singer; Ustad and Kurchi's daughter; Chandan and Mahua's adoptive daughter; Adrija's adoptive sister; Anurag's wife; Roddur's mother (2015 – 2017)
- Vikram Chatterjee as Dr. Anurag “Tatan” Banerjee – A renowned surgeon; Amitabha and Malobika's son; Mishtu's brother; Meghla's husband; Roddur's father; Adrija's love interest; Tua's love interest (2015 – 2017)
- Sritama Bhattacharjee as Adrija “Titir” Banerjee (née Sen) – Chandan and Mahua's daughter; Meghla's adoptive sister; Anurag’s former one-sided obsessive lover; Piklu's wife (2015 – 2017)
- Aishwarya Sen as Anindita “Tua” Basu – Anurag's rescuer and former one-sided obsessive lover (2016 – 2017)

=== Recurring ===
- Dr. Basudeb Mukherjee as Dr. Agnideb Banerjee – Amitabha and Abir's brother; Urmimala's husband; Bumba and Mimi's father (2015 – 2017)
- Saswati Guha Thakurta as Dr. Urmimala Banerjee – Agnideb's wife; Piklu's maternal aunt; Bumba and Mimi's mother (2015 – 2017)
- Biswajit Chakraborty as Amitabha Banerjee – Agnideb and Abir's brother; Malobika's late husband; Anurag and Mishtu's father (2015 – 2016) (Deceased) (The death track wasn't shown.)
- Laboni Sarkar as Malobika Banerjee – Amitabha's widow; Anurag and Mishtu's mother (2015 – 2017)
- Rajashree Bhowmik as Nandini Banerjee – Agnideb, Amitabha and Abir's cousin (Antagonist) (2016)
- Sujan Mukhopadhyay as Abir Banerjee aka Paglaghora – Agnideb and Amitabha's brother; Shabnam's husband (2015 – 2017)
- Nibedita Mukherjee as Shabnam Banerjee – Abir's wife (2017)
- Suman Banerjee as Dr. Bumba Banerjee – Agnideb and Urmimala's son; Mimi's brother; Kajari's husband (2015 – 2017)
- Rajanya Mitra as Kajari Banerjee – Bumba's wife (2015 – 2017)
- Asmee Ghosh as Bumba and Kajari's daughter (2015)
- Sonali Chowdhury as Mimi Banerjee Chakraborty – Agnideb and Urmimala's daughter; Bumba's sister; Sanjoy's wife (2017)
- Rahul Chakraborty as Sanjoy Chakraborty – Mimi's husband (2017)
- Dwaipayan Das as Piklu Banerjee – Urmimala's nephew; Anurag and Mishtu's cousin; Adrija's husband (2015 – 2017)
- Ritu Rai Acharya as Arna “Mishtu” Banerjee – Malobika and Amitabha's daughter; Anurag's sister (2015 – 2016)
- Chandan Sen as Prof. Chandan Sen – Mahua's husband; Adrija's father; Meghla's adoptive father (2015 – 2017)
- Subhadra Mukherjee as Mahua Sen – Chandan's wife; Adrija's mother; Meghala's adoptive mother (2015 – 2017)
- Abhishek Chatterjee as Ustad Rashid Ali – Kurchi's husband; Meghla's father and mentor (2015 – 2016)
- Rita Dutta Chakraborty as Kurchi Majumdar Rashid Ali – Ustad's wife; Meghla's mother (2016)
- Sonal Mishra as Munni Dasgupta – Deep's sister (2017)
- Anusuya Majumdar as Malobika's mother (2015)
- Santu Mukherjee as Abhinash Mukherjee – Tua's adoptive father (2016)
- Swarnava Sanyal as Bumba and Kajari's son (2015)
- Sreela Majumdar as Sharmistha Mukherjee – Abhinash's wife and Tua's paternal aunt / adoptive mother (2016)
- Bhaswar Chatterjee as Adv. Anweshan Ghosh – Subhalakshmi's husband (2016)
- Debolina Dutta Mukherjee as Adv. Subhalakshmi Ghosh – Anweshan's wife (2016)
- Anindya Chatterjee as Deep Dasgupta – Mallika's husband, Adrija's (fake) husband when she impersonated as Mallika (2017)
- Riya Ganguly Chakraborty as Deep's sister
- Sourav Das as Deep's brother
- Shankar Chakraborty as Abin Majumdar (2015)
- Prantik Banerjee as Subhankar (2016)
- Avrajit Chakraborty as Subhro Shankar

== Adaptations ==
Language	Title	Premiere date	Network(s)	Last aired	Notes
Bengali	Ichche Nodee ইচ্ছেনদী	15 June 2015	Star Jalsha	28 May 2017	Original
Hindi	Yeh Rishta Kya Kehlata Hai (season 3) ये रिश्ता क्या कहलाता है ३	27 October 2021	StarPlus	5 November 2023	Remake
Hindi	Iss Ishq Ka Rabb Rakha इस इश़्क का रब राखा	16 September 2024	StarPlus	20 April 2025	Remake

== See also ==
- Phagun Bou
- Kusum Dola
- Ishti Kutum
