= Shataf Figar =

Indian actor

- Born: Kolkata, West Bengal, India
- Education: University of Calcutta
- Occupation: Actor
- Years active: 2014–present

Shataf Figar is an Indian actor. He acted in movies like Shershaah, 89, Kolkata Calling, Dark Chocolate and Chorabali, Khoj and Cockpit, Made in China (2019) and Extraction (2020). In 2022, he appeared in the film Raavan.

== Career ==
He started his film debut with Kolkata Calling in 2014. He also starred in Brahman Naman is a 2016 Indian comedy film directed by Qaushiq Mukherjee. It was shown in the World Cinema Dramatic Competition section at the 2016 Sundance Film Festival. It was released on Netflix worldwide on 7 July 2016. He has done an Ad film with Shah Rukh Khan for West Bengal Tourism. He made his Telugu debut with Ruler in which he portrayed the main antagonist.

In 2023, he played the role of Ratan/Daata in the Bollywood movie Gaslight.

== Filmography ==
=== Films ===
Year	Film	Role	Language	Ref
2014	Kolkata Calling		Bengali	
2015	89		Bengali	
2015	Sesh Anka	Rajeev Mitro	Bengali	
2015	Besh Korechi Prem Korechi	Dibakar's younger brother	Bengali	
2015	Arshinagar (Guest Appearance)		Bengali	
2015	Rajkahini	Lawyer of Pakistan	Bengali	
2016	Chorabali	Vishnu	Bengali	
2016	Brahman Naman	Brian D' Costa	English	
2016	Dark Chocolate	Shadab Kapoor	Bengali	
2017	Devi		Bengali	
2017	Khoj	Dr. Prashant Choudhury	Bengali	
2017	Cockpit	Air Traffic Controller	Bengali	
2018	Aami Joy Chatterjee		Bengali	
2018	Kabir	Parvez	Bengali	
2018	Chupkotha - Hoichoi Original Film	Rodriguez	Bengali	
2018	Kuasha Jakhon		Bengali	
2018	Helicopter Eela	Madhavi Bhogat	Hindi	
2019	Bhobishyoter Bhoot	Alex	Bengali	
2019	Barof	Subham Biswas	Bengali	
2019	Mon Jaane Na	Murad Bhai	Bengali	
2019	Made in China	SIT Head	Hindi	
2019	Ruler	Bhavaninath Tagore	Telugu	
2020	Ghost Stories	Ira's Father	Hindi	
2020	Love Aaj Kal	Veer's father	Hindi	
2020	Extraction	Bajlur Rashid	English	
2020	Breathe: Into the Shadows	Dr. Narang	Hindi	
2021	Shershaah	Lt. Col. Y. K. Joshi	Hindi	
2022	Swastik Sanket	Dr. Shumakar	Bengali	
2022	Khufiya	Brigadier Mirza	Hindi	
2022	Raavan	Rajiv Sharma	Bengali	
2022	Chengiz	Omar	Bengali	
2023	Gaslight	Ratan Singh Gaikwad/Daata	Hindi	
2023	Khufiya	Brigadier Mirza	Hindi	
2024	Chote Nawab	Afsar	Hindi	
2024	Ishq Vishk Rebound	Shahir's father	Hindi	
2024	Bhool Bhulaiyaa 3	Vicky Khanna	Hindi	
2025	Match Fixing	Parvez Kayani	Hindi	
2026	Rakkhosh	Zayaan	Bengali	

=== Web series ===
Year	Title	Role	Language	Platform	Notes
2019	Skyfire	Udayvan Khatri	Hindi	ZEE5	
2020	Breathe: Into the Shadows	Dr. Narang	Hindi	Amazon Prime Video	
2021	Punch Beat 2	Vikrant Sinha	Hindi	Alt Balaji	
2021	Bang Baang		Hindi	ZEE5, ALTBalaji	
2021	Aarya	Arjun Dhariwal	Hindi	Disney Hotstar	
2023	Charlie Chopra & The Mystery Of Solang Valley	Ajay Thakur	Hindi	SonyLIV	
2024	Showtime	Rustom Boxwala	Hindi	Disney+ Hotstar	
2024	Big Girls Don't Cry	Bob Verma	Hindi	Prime Video	
2025	Karma Korma	Arjun	Bengali	Hoichoi	
