= Phagun Bou =

Indian television series

- Genre: Soap opera
- Developed by: Leena Gangopadhyay
- Written by: Leena Gangopadhyay
- Directed by: Saibal Banerjee; Diganta Sinha
- Creative director: Leena Gangopadhyay
- Presented by: Bright Advertising Pvt. Ltd.
- Starring: Vikram Chatterjee; Oindrila Sen
- Theme music composer: Debojyoti Mishra
- Opening theme: "Fagun Hawai Hawai" "Phagun Bou-er Katha" by Anweshaa
- Country of origin: India
- Original language: Bengali
- No. of episodes: 534

Production
- Executive producers: Sumit Kumar Roy; Satyajit Chakraborty (Magic Moments); Taniya; Nilanjan (Star Jalsha).
- Producers: Saibal Banerjee; Leena Gangopadhyay
- Production locations: Kolkata; Asansol; Kalimpong
- Cinematography: Siddhartha Mukherjee
- Editors: Sameer; Soumen
- Camera setup: Multi-camera
- Running time: 22 minutes
- Production company: Magic Moments Motion Pictures

Original release
- Network: Star Jalsha
- Release: 19 March 2018 – 29 November 2019

Phagun Bou is an Indian Bengali-language television soap opera that premiered on 19 March 2018 on Star Jalsha. It was produced under Magic Moments Motion Pictures of Saibal Banerjee and Leena Gangopadhyay. The show starred Vikram Chatterjee and Oindrila Sen in lead roles and Koushik Roy in a negative role.

== Plot ==
Phagun Bou dealt with the whimsical nature of the relationship that develops between prestigious doctor, Dr. Ayandeep Ghosh, (nicknamed Roddur) and MA Law student and aspiring singer Mohul Bose, two strangers destined to be together for life. The series followed the blossoming love between the two after many ups and downs in their relationship, where Mohul was initially inclined towards Ayandeep's cousin, popular and arrogant singer Anurup despite her parents' Chandrajit and Amrapali's objections. However, their relationship takes a survival challenge when Chandrajit dies, Mohul, Amrapali and her brother Munna learn about Chandrajit's first wife and their daughter Bibi, and Ayandeep is coincidentally engaged to her cousin Mou. When Mohul is forced to marry Ayandeep after Mou runs away from the wedding, their relationship takes a huge turning point. Mohul doesn't accept him, Mou's parents become jealous about the marriage, Ayandeep's foster mother and aunt Mayurakshi doesn't accept Mohul because she apparently suffers from Chandrajit's rejection, and Anurup creates a misunderstanding that Mohul is having an extra-marital affair with him. However, Mohul gradually accepts Ayandeep and Anurup and Mayurakshi's misunderstandings are cleared. Ayandeep also discovers another secret that he is adopted and is the son of his uncle Anirudda, a struggling actor who kept a secret from his family that he married Malobika, a classic dancer and former lawyer and had a son named Babi who was presumed dead years ago. This causes a emotional time for him and the family even after they welcome Malobika into the family. Later, Mayurakshi becomes jealous of his relationship with Malobika. Bibi finally marries a man who is initially hesitant of her condition, accepts her. Anurup asks for forgiveness and moves on by marrying Brishtilekha, only to find out she is a terrorist. After much drama, he separates from her. A new love triangle forms between Roddur's sisters as Tuki marries Tultuli's estranged husband. This sours their relationship. As Roddur succeeds in his musical career, his record producer becomes closer to him, wowing him, much to Mohul's dislike. It's revealed that she was planted by Anurup who was only pretending to have repented. When his plan fails, he starts intoxicating Roddur's meals and bribes a doctor into making Roddur believe that he has cancer and has short amount of time left. The family is devastated with this news, their misery only increases when Mohul finds out that she will difficulty in conceiving. Jadabendra too dies some time later. Roddur asks Anurup to marry Mohul and take care of her after his demise. However, Anurup's plan fails as Mohul plays the recording of Anurup bribing the doctor in front of the whole family. She learns about this trick from the doctor himself and exposes Anurup. The family kicks Anurup out of the family.

=== 5 years later ===
Tuki has become a mother of a girl. Whereas, Tultuli has divorced her husband again, moves out of the city and becomes a teacher in the hills. Mohul and Roddur happily tell the family that they're expecting a child. The show ends on a happy note

== Cast ==
=== Main ===
- Vikram Chatterjee as Dr. Ayandeep Ghosh aka Roddur - A doctor and a singer, Mohul's husband
- Oindrila Sen as Mohul Ghosh; Anurup's ex-girlfriend; Ayandeep's wife

=== Recurring ===
- Koushik Roy as Anurup Mallick aka Roop – Roddur's younger cousin brother, a singer, and Mohul's ex-boyfriend turned archrival, Brishtilekha's estranged husband. Anurup is Mayurakshi's sororal nephew (her sister's son) and has been raised by her
- Ankita Chakraborty as Brishtilekha Mallick aka Brishti- Anurup's wife, Mohul's rival
- Abhishek Chatterjee as Chandrajit Bose aka Chandu – Bidhumukhi and Amrapali's husband; Bibi, Mohul and Munna's father (deceased)
- Anushree Das as Bidhumukhi Bose – Chandrajit's first wife, Bibi's mother, Mohul and Munna's stepmother
- Bidipta Chakraborty as Amrapali Bose – Chandrajit's second wife, Mohul and Munna's mother, Bibi's stepmother
- Debolina Mukherjee as Bibi Ghosh - Chandrajit and Bidhumukhi's daughter, Mohul and Munna's step-sister
- Santu Mukherjee as Jadabendra Ghosh aka Jodu – Roddur's eldest paternal uncle; Amitava, Anirudhha and Rajatava's elder brother; Barshan and Tultuli's father
- Bulbuli Panja as Simontika Dutta aka Tultuli (née Ghosh) - Jadabendra's daughter, Barshan's sister, Roddur's cousin sister
- Suman Banerjee as Gagandeep Ghosh aka Barshan – Jodu's son, Tultuli's elder brother, Roddur's elder cousin brother, a salaryman and Nilanjana's husband
- Sneha Chatterjee Bhowmick as Nilanjana Ghosh aka Nilu - Gagandeep's wife
- Lekha Chatterjee as Binapani Ghosh aka Bina - Roddur's younger sister; Amitava and Mayurakshi's daughter
- Ashmee Ghosh as Sampurna Ghosh - Roddur's younger sister; Amitava and Mayurakshi's daughter
- Shankar Chakraborty as Amitava Ghosh aka Ankur – Roddur's foster father and elder paternal uncle, Mayurakshi's husband, Tuki's father, Anurup's maternal uncle
- Laboni Sarkar as Mayurakshi Ghosh – Roddur's foster mother and elder paternal aunt, Amitava's wife, Tuki's mother, Anurup's maternal aunt
- Madhubani Ghosh Goswami as Madhuparna Ghosh aka Tuki – Roddur's younger cousin sister, Amitava and Mayurakshi's daughter, Nilanjan's second wife, Tota's mother
- Badshah Moitra as Nilanjan Dutta - Tultuli's second husband, Tuki's husband, Tota's father
- Bharat Kaul as Aniruddha Ghosh aka Ani / Gulu – Malobika's husband, Roddur's biological father, an actor
- Malabika Sen as Malobika Ghosh (née Bose) - Aniruddha's wife, Roddur's biological mother, a classical dancer and former lawyer
- Diganta Bagchi as Rajatava Ghosh - Sonali's husband
- Rajashree Bhowmick as Sonali Ghosh - Rajatava's wife

== Production ==
=== Development ===
Screenwriter Leena Gangopadhyay who has previously written down the script for Bengali TV shows like ETV Bangla's long-running drama series Sonar Horin and another daily soap Binni Dhaner Khoi, Zee Bangla's partition-themed love saga Keya Patar Nouko, and Star Jalsha's serials Ishti Kutum and Jol Nupur; developed the central idea for Phagun Bou, whose premise was initially based on a rivalrous love triangle.

=== Casting ===
Vikram Chatterjee who had previously collaborated with Ganguly and Banerjee in their production Ichche Nodee, was selected to portray the lead role of Dr. Ayandeep Ghosh aka Roddur. Oindrilla Sen who was seen opposite Chatterjee in the 2010 romance drama series "Saat Paake Bandha" (on Zee Bangla), was cast in to play the titular protagonist, Mohul aka "Phagun Bou"; taking into account her onscreen chemistry with Chatterjee. Actor Koushik Roy, noted for his negative portrayal of "Krishnendu Sengupta" in the romance saga Bojhena Se Bojhena; was cast to portray Anurup, the other person aspiring for Mohul's love and the chief antagonist of the series.

=== Filming ===
The show has been filmed at several locations, the most prominent being Kalimpong.The show was shot in parts of North Bengal.

=== Ratings ===
In the third week of June 2018, Phagun Bou became the most watched show on its airing channel, Star Jalsha. It had a target rating point of 6.4 in its first week.

== Adaptations ==
Language	Title	Original Release	Network(s)	Last aired	Ref.
Hindi	Ghum Hai Kisikey Pyaar Meiin Season 3 गुम है किसी के प्यार में	30 January 2025	StarPlus	4 May 2025	

== Soundtrack ==
The title song for the series Phagun Bou has been sung by singer Anwesha Dutta Gupta. While, the original music has been given by Debojyoti Mishra.

Phagun Bou Soundtrack:
No.	Title	Singer	Length
1.	"Phagun Bou-er Katha"	Anwesha Dutta Gupta	2:32
