= Bhaggyolokkhi =

2025 Indian Bengali film

- Theatrical release poster
- Directed by: Mainak Bhaumik
- Screenplay by: Mainak Bhaumik
- Story by: Mainak Bhaumik
- Produced by: Pradip Kumar Nandy
- Starring: Ritwick Chakraborty; Solanki Roy
- Cinematography: Subhadeep Naskar
- Edited by: Sumit Chowdhury
- Music by: Songs: Anupam Roy; Score: Savvy
- Production company: Nandy Movies
- Distributed by: SSR Cinemas
- Release date: January 10, 2025
- Running time: 120 minutes
- Country: India
- Language: Bengali

Bhaggyolokkhi (transl. Lady Luck) is a 2025 Indian Bengali-language black comedy crime thriller film written and directed by Mainak Bhaumik. It has been produced by Pradip Kumar Nandy under the banner of Nandy Movies. The film stars Ritwick Chakraborty and Solanki Roy in the lead roles, marking their first collaboration.

The first look poster of the lead duo was released on 17 December 2024. Anupam Roy has composed the music of the film while Savvy has done the background score. Subhadeep Naskar did the cinematography while Sumit Chowdhury handled the editing. The film was released in the theatres on 10 January 2025.

== Synopsis ==
Satya and his wife Kaberi are a middle-class couple facing financial difficulties after Kaberi loses her job. Their lives change when a man claiming to be Satya's friend arrives at their home with a suitcase containing a large amount of money. The man dies from a drug overdose, leaving Satya and Kaberi with the cash.

The money belongs to people involved in an illegal drug trade. A minister, a mafia leader and their associates search for the missing money. The police also investigate the case. Satya and Kaberi try to keep the suitcase and hide the circumstances surrounding the man's death while dealing with the people searching for him.

== Cast ==
- Ritwick Chakraborty as Satya Ganguly, a journalist
- Solanki Roy as Kaveri Ganguly, Satya's wife
- Swastika Dutta as Gargi, a television actress
- Neel Mukherjee as Abhijit Ghosh, a police officer
- Subrat Dutta as Abhijit's assistant officer
- Loknath Dey as a mafia leader
- Ratan Sarkhel
- Debapriyo Mukherjee as Laal, a mercenary killer
- Judhajit Sarkar as Neel, a mercenary killer
- Ananya Das
- Aritra Ganguli
- Bimal Giri as the man who dies of drug overdose

== Marketing ==
The teaser of Bhaggyolokkhi was released on 8 December 2024. The trailer of the film was revealed on 27 December 2024. The film held its premiere on 11 January 2025, a day after its theatrical release.

== Reception ==
=== Critical reception ===
Bidisha Chatterjee of Sangbad Pratidin reviewed the film and opined "For the audience of Bengali content who are used to seeing family dramas, detective franchises, serious films with issues or the complexity of relationships within four walls, Bhaggyolokkhi is undoubtedly a change of pace." She praised the unique genre of the film, Mainak Bhaumik's direction, the screenplay, the dialogues, Ritwick and Solanki's chemistry and respective performances, the presence of subtle romance, the usage of subtle satire throughout the film, the display of humour amidst bloodshed, the songs, the background score and the cinematography.

Subhankar Chakraborty of The Wall reviewed the film and wrote "It is a new kind film for Mainak. But it is not a new film for the audience. In today's time, those who are consuming OTT content will understand many things of this film in advance." He appreciated the director for experimenting with a new genre, the performance of the extended cast, Savvy's background score and the soundtrack but bemoaned the weak screenplay, lack of a proper mystery factor, the absence of a single intense moment of doubt throughout the film, underdeveloped sub-plots, weak dialogues and the overly conventional climax.

Shoma A. Chatterji of the North East Film Journal reviewed the film and opined "The film has a tightly-knit script but lacks the humour the original film had as value-added entertainment. Those who have watched the film Lootcase, will conclude that Bhaggyolokkhi has been a straight lift from the Hindi film." She applauded Ritiwick and Sohini's acting, the music, the cinematography, the editing, Bhaumik's direction and the lighting in the night scenes but criticized the director for heavily getting inspired from another film, the erratic nature of the adjacent characters, multiple unanswered questions and the typecasting of many of the supporting actors.

Amay Deb Roy of Anandabazar Patrika rated the film 7.5/10 stars and noted "The film's budget is clearly visible. The director had to make a police chief's office out of an ordinary drawing room. All that misery is covered by the brilliance of acting. Bhaggyolokkhi is proof that camera, lighting, acting and director's shrewdness can cover up financial woes!" He reviewed the film on a positive note and praised the performance of all the actors; particularly Ritwick and Solanki.

Abhirup Ghosh reviewed the film for T2 Online and wrote "With ample violence, gore, crime, twists and turns and quirky characters on the serving, garnished with liberal doses of black comedy, you wouldn’t expect Bhaggyolokkhi to be a Mainak Bhaumik film." He praised the performances of the actors, the tension and suspense maintained throughout the film, director's experimentation for combining multiple genres, the unique storytelling, the usage of dark humour to lighten up the gore scenes, the cinematography and the editing but bemoaned the weakly written climax and the underwhelming action sequences.
