= Elar Char Adhyay =

- Poster
- Directed by: Bappaditya Bandopadhyay
- Based on: Char Adhyay by Rabindranath Tagore
- Produced by: Dreamz Movies and Entertainment Pvt. Ltd
- Starring: Paoli Dam; Vikram Chatterjee; Indraneil Sengupta
- Edited by: Dipak Mandal
- Release date: 11 May 2012
- Country: India
- Language: Bengali

Elar Char Adhyay is a 2012 Bengali film. The film is directed by Bappaditya Bandopadhyay, produced by Dreamz Movies and Entertainment Pvt. Ltd. and based on Rabindranath Tagore's 1934 novel Char Adhyay.

== Plot ==
The film is set in India under British Raj in 1940s. Indranath is a leader of a group which is fighting for Indian independence. Ela is the teacher of the group. Ela is caught in a dilemma between her love for Atindra and her commitment towards her country.

== Location ==
Mostly the shooting location of Elar Char Adhyay is in Ichapur Nawabganj, a beautiful city near the bank of Ganges in North 24 Parganas West Bengal. In the movie, the palace picturized as Ela's home is originally named as Mandal Bhavan, which is one of the oldest and heritage palace of Ichapur. The school where Ela was teaching is Sridhar Bansidhar High School which is more than 100 years old. The arrival of Atin is shot in Ichapur Mandal Ghat, which is also one of the oldest Ghat of Ichapur.

== Cast ==
- Paoli Dam
- Indraneil Sengupta
- Deepankar Dey
- Shamaun Ahmed
- Rudranil Ghosh
- Arunima Ghosh
- Barun Chanda
- Kamalika Chanda
- Vikram Chatterjee
- Nitya Ganguly

== See also ==
- Muktodhara, a 2012 Bengali film
