= Debolina Dutta =

Indian film actress

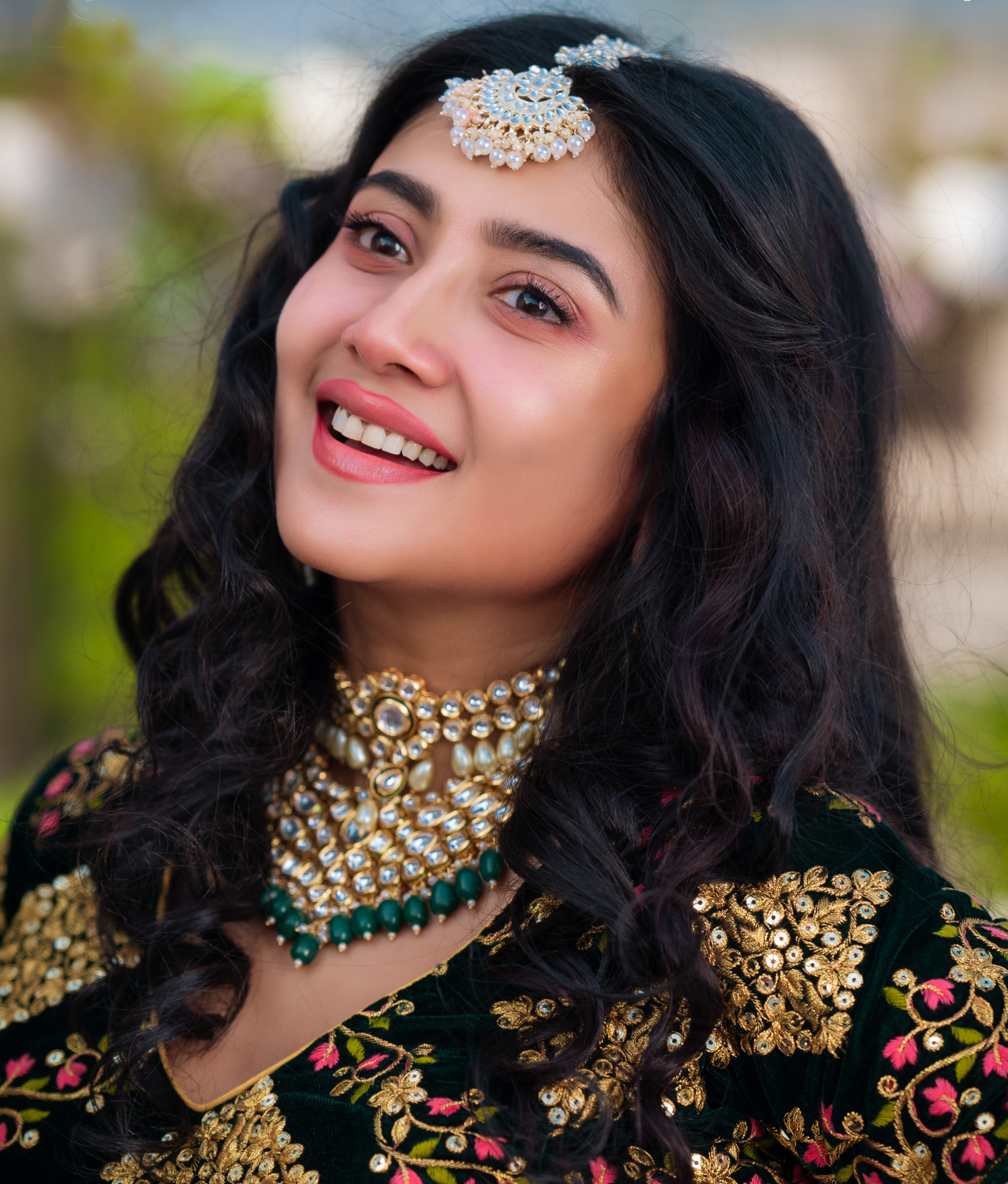
- Debolina Dutta
- Born: Kolkata
- Occupation: Actress
- Years active: 1996—present
- Spouse: Tathagata Mukherjee (m. 2014; sep. 2021)

Debolina Dutta (born 20 April 1977) is an Indian actress known for her work in Bengali cinema and television.

She made her acting debut with a small role in Seemarekha (1996), a Bengali TV series. She rose to prominence for her role as Deepaboli in Saat Kahon, a Bengali TV series based on Samaresh Majumdar's novel of the same name. She hit the crux of her stardom after she starred as Nandini in Ravi Ojha's Ek Akasher Niche. Her success continued with notable performances in television series such as Kobe Je Kothay, Sakhi and Andarmahal. She made her Bollywood debut in Rajnandini (2022). She featured as the Cover Girl in the renowned SRL Calendar 2025, produced by Sarbajit Ghosh.

== Career ==
Dutta began her acting career with a small role in Seemarekha, a 1996 Bengali TV series. After Aditi Chatterjee walked out, Ravi Ojha approached Dutta to play the lead role of Nandini in Ek Akasher Niche. The role catapulted her to stardom. She played the protagonist in Sin Sister.

== List of works ==
=== Films ===
Key
§	Indicates a short film

Year	Title	Role	Notes	Ref
2002	Manush Amanush			
2011	Raja Gaja No Problem			
2013	Ekla Akash			
2014	Taan			
2014	Chotushkone			
2015	Anubrato Bhalo Acho			
2015	Ebar Shabor			
2015	Force		Cameo	
2015	Sesh Anka			
2016	Bastav			
2016	Shuopoka §			
2019	Unicorn			
2019	Borunbabur Bondhu			
2020	Sin Sister	Piyu/ Kuhu	Double role	
2020	Bhotbhoti			
2021	Rajnandini			
2021	Kishalay			
2025	Bahurup			
2026	Muharat			
2026	Chobiwala			

=== TV series ===
Year	Title	Role	Channel	Ref
1996	Seemerekha			
	Akashchoyan			
	Prabaha			
	Ki Ashay Bandhi Khelaghor			
	Ek No. Mess Bari			
	Shanai			
2000	Janmabhumi		DD Bangla	
1999–2000	Saat Kahon	Deepaboli	Aakash Aath	
2000–2005	Ek Akasher Niche	Nandini	Zee Bangla	Replaced Aditi Chatterjee
2003–?	Kobe Je Kothay			
	Neel Seemana			
2003	Pratibimbo		Zee Bangla	
	Raja and Goja, Bindas Moja		Zee Bangla	
2008	Durga	Titli Roy Chowdhury	Star Jalsha	Later replaced by Debjani Kaushik
2008-2010	Ekhane Aakash Neel	Dr. Barna Roy	Star Jalsha	
	Shaola			
	Mahabharat	Draupadi (voice)	Star Jalsha Dubbed in Bengali	
2013-2014	Sokhi	Kamala	Star Jalsha	
2014-2015	Thik Jeno Love Story	Rajeshwari / Mon	Star Jalsha	
2015-17	Ichchhe Nodee	Adv. Subhalakshmi Ghosh	Star Jalsha	
2017-2018	Andarmahal	Ananya Chatterjee	Zee Bangla	
	Kusum Dola	Star Jalsha		
2020-2021	Sreemoyee	Advocate Swarnachapa	Star Jalsha	
2021-2022	Tin Shaktir Adhar Trishul	Rajnandini	Colors Bangla	

=== Mahalaya ===
Year	Title	Season	Role	Channel	Notes	Ref
2022	Debi Doshomahavidya	Devi Tripurasundari	Colors Bangla			

=== Reality show ===
Year	Title	Role	Channel	Notes	Ref
	Mirakkel	Judge	Zee Bangla		
2016	Bigg Boss Bangla 2	Contestant	Colors Bangla		
