= Khoj (2017 film) =

- Directed by: Arka Ganguly
- Written by: Arka Ganguly
- Produced by: Shaibal Banerjee
- Starring: Vikram Chatterjee; Shataf Figar; Susmita Dey; Poonam Gurung
- Edited by: Subhajit Singha
- Music by: Raja Narayan Deb
- Production company: Magic Moments Motion Pictures
- Release date: 2 June 2017
- Running time: 116 minutes
- Language: Bengali

Khoj is a Bengali psychological thriller film directed by Arka Ganguly. This film was released on 2 June 2017 under the banner of Magic Moments Motion Pictures. Khoj has won total 9 international awards at Cinema on the Bayou Film Festival, Studio city international film festival, Idyll wild international festival of cinema etc.

== Plot ==
Police inspector Sayan Bose of a hilly town, Rimtik, is assigned to investigate a mysterious incident. A lady repeatedly screams from a house. This is Dr. Prashant Chowdhury's house who does not allow anyone into the house and says that it is nothing but his wife screaming due to injection pain and that is normal. Sayan becomes more suspicious when the neighbors tell that they have often heard the screams but never seen the doctor's wife. The next day, the doctor comes to the police station to file for a missing diary of his wife, Jonaki. Sayan realizes that there is something fishy going on since the doctor behaves strangely with the police and refuses to provide anything helpful except a passport-size photo of his wife. Things turn out to be even more complicated when the doctor attempts suicide after having a fall out with Sayan. Finally, Sayan's investigations uncover a truth which had been hidden for eight months.

== Cast ==
- Vikram Chatterjee as Sayan Bose
- Shataf Figar as Dr. Prashant Choudhury
- Sushmita Dey as Jonaki Choudhury
- Lalit Malla as Jeevan
- Punam Gurung as Rose
