= Bahurup =

Indian Bengali-language psychological-mystery thriller film

- বহুরূপ
- Directed by: Akash Malakar
- Written by: Akash Malakar
- Produced by: Susanta Biswas; Chandan Kanti Sarkar
- Starring: Soham Chakraborty; Idhika Paul; Kamaleswar Mukherjee; Loknath Dey; Bharat Kaul; Debolina Dutta
- Edited by: Subhajit Singha
- Production companies: Rukmini Films & Entertainment; S B Films & Entertainment
- Distributed by: Reliance Entertainment; SSR Cinemas
- Release date: 29 August 2025
- Running time: 124 minutes
- Country: India
- Language: Bengali

Bahurup (Bengali: বহুরূপ, transl. Multifaceted) is a 2025 Indian Bengali-language psychological-mystery thriller film directed by Akash Malakar and produced by Susanta Biswas and Chandan Kanti Sarkar under the banners of Rukmini Films & Entertainment and S B Films & Entertainment.The film stars Soham Chakraborty in seven different roles alongside Idhika Paul, Kamaleswar Mukherjee, and Debolina Dutta.

== Plot ==
The film follows Abhimanyu Banerjee, a celebrated actor whose artistic obsession with his roles leads to a psychological unraveling. As he delves deeper into each character, he begins to lose grip on his own identity, blurring the lines between fiction and reality. Each performance leaves a mark on his psyche, forcing him to confront the haunting question: who is he when the curtain falls? The narrative explores the cost of transformation, the fragility of self, and the seductive danger of living too many lives. While the life of an actor may seem colorful and smooth from the outside, the film delves into the reality behind the appearances.

== Cast ==
- Soham Chakraborty as Abhimanyu "Abhi" Banerjee
- Idhika Paul as Uttara, Abhi's love interest
- Kamaleswar Mukherjee as Vrishabhaditya, a police officer
- Loknath Dey as DD, a film director
- Bharat Kaul
- Debolina Dutta
- Raju Majumdar

== Production ==
=== Development ===
The film was announced in 2024 with Soham Chakraborty and Idhika Paul in lead roles. Director Akash Malakar stated that Soham would be discovered in a new avatar with seven different looks in this film, something never done before in Bengali cinema.

=== Filming ===
Principal photography began in August 2024 with shooting locations in North Bengal and Kolkata. The production faced temporary interruptions due to remuneration issues between the producers and crew members, but the director clarified that these issues were resolved promptly.

=== Makeup and Transformations ===
Soham Chakraborty underwent extensive prosthetic makeup and transformation processes to portray seven different characters in the film, a feat never before seen for the actor. Makeup artist Somnath Kundu was responsible for creating these looks, which included an old man with long white hair, a white beard and mustache, wrinkled skin, and sharp eyes hidden beneath thick eyebrows, as well as a woman and various other characters. Each look required 2.5 to 3 hours to apply and approximately an hour to remove. Soham described the process as "not just about appearance, but transforming his very identity," noting that even his closest family members would not recognize him in the makeup, even if he walked around on the street. He expressed immense gratitude towards Kundu, whom he affectionately calls "Kaku," praising him not just as a makeup man but as a "true artist" and a "great makeup artist." Soham admitted to initial fear about the role but gained confidence upon hearing Kundu was involved, finding joy in the challenge of moving past his old thought processes to justify each character correctly. Director Akash Malakar credited Kundu's "magic touch" and immense patience for making the transformations possible, stating it would not have been possible without him. He also expressed deep gratitude for Soham's dedication and patience throughout the demanding process. Kundu emphasized that while the work was laborious for both the artist and the actor, it was done with joy because the team loved the lean, interesting story hidden behind the seven looks.

== Release ==
Bahurup is scheduled to be released theatrically on 29 August 2025. The film made history with Bengali cinema's first-ever live poster launch on 8 July 2025, showcasing Soham Chakraborty's versatile looks. A song from the film has been released, featuring Soham and Idhika Paul.

== Reception ==
Prior to release, the unique concept of an actor portraying seven different looks has generated considerable anticipation in the Bengali film industry. The trailer launch event was emotionally charged, with Soham Chakraborty expressing gratitude for the challenging role.

A mixed review in the Times of India called the film an "addition to the list of serial killer thrillers". Another review found the structure of the film unclear.
