= Mainak Bhaumik =

Indian Bengali filmmaker and editor

- Born: Kolkata, West Bengal, India
- Occupations: Film director; Documentary filmmaker; Editor
- Years active: 1998–present

Mainak Bhaumik is an Indian Bengali film director, documentary filmmaker and editor. He made his directorial debut with the 2006 Bengali film Aamra. His next directorial was Bedroom (2012). He has directed multiple critically successful movies including Maach Mishti & More, Bibaho Diaries, Generation Ami, Cheeni and Ekannoborti. He made his directorial debut in OTT with the Hoichoi series Break Up Story. Bhaumik has also directed few web series and short films in Bengali.

== Education ==
A student of Economics and Computer Science, Bhaumik graduated with a double major from City University in New York. Then, he enrolled in Columbia University for the M.A. program in Literature. He did a course on film production from the New York Film Academy and learned about film and video editing from New School University. He took screenwriting workshops with Pulitzer Prize winning playwright David Mamet, while staying in New York.

== Career ==
Bhaumik started his career in 1998 by directing a short film His Life - Her Story, which won the Best Short Film award at "Florida Film Festival" (1998). In 2006 he directed his first Bengali film Aamra His next film Bedroom (2012) is a dark ensemble film that deals with the new generation of young Indians who struggle with depression, failure and identity crisis in a Facebook savvy world that is obsessed with picture perfect lives. In 2013, Bhaumik released the feature film Maach Mishti & More which he refers to as his love-letter to his city of Kolkata. Released in the same year, Ami Aar Amar Girlfriends is a coming-of-age movie about the lives of three Indian girls who cling to their friendship in times of trouble. In 2014, his next film Take One, is about a modern Indian woman, an actress who plays the Hindu mythological character Sita, and is judged harshly by Indian society because of her sexual indiscretions. But unlike Sita, who was forced by society into exile, the actress rejects hypocritical society's unfair judgment of her and withdraws voluntarily into her private exile.

His documentary films on endangered Indian ethnic folk art forms and culture have been internationally distributed by the Documentary Educational Resources in Boston, in collaboration with the Smithsonian Institution. These films have been screened in numerous international film festivals across the globe, and have also been picked up by German Films Italia, Rome, for the Italian TV rights. He won the Art Award in 2005 for his documentary film Gone to Pat, at the Society for Visual Anthropology, American Anthropological Association. Since then, his feature films have also earned critical acclaim and commercial success.

== Filmography ==
=== As a director ===
==== Feature films ====
Year	Title
2006	Aamra
2012	Bedroom
2013	Maach Mishti & More
2013	Ami Aar Amar Girlfriends
2014	Take One
2014	Kolkata Calling
2015	Family Album
2017	Bibaho Diaries
2017	Chawlochhitro Circus
2018	Ghare & Baire
2018	Happy Pill
2018	Aami vs Tumi
2018	Generation Ami
2019	Bornoporichoy
2019	Goyenda Junior
2020	Cheeni
2021	Ekannoborti
2022	Mini
2023	Cheeni 2
2025	Bhaggyolokkhi
2025	Grihosto
2025	Batshorik
2026	Made in kolkata

==== Web Series ====
Year	Title
—	Break Up Story
—	Maradonar Juto

==== Short film / Documentary ====
Year	Title
—	His Life - Her Story
—	Gone to Pat
—	Surviving Chau
—	Melting Wok

=== As an editor ===
Year	Title
2006	The Bong Connection
2008	Chalo Let's Go
2010	Arekti Premer Golpo
2012	Shabdo
