= Tathagata Mukherjee =

Indian actor (born 1985)

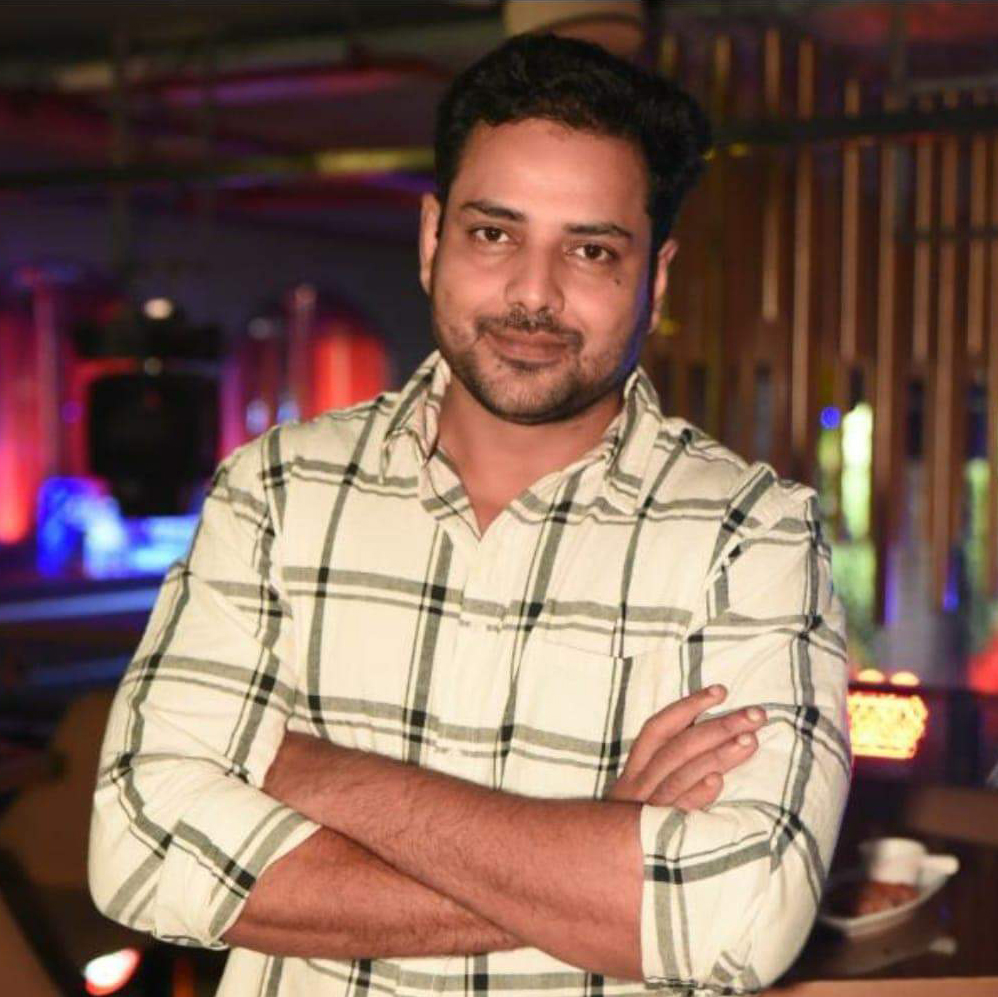
- Tathagata Mukherjee
- Born: Tathagata Mukherjee; 15 May 1985 (age 41); Kolkata, West Bengal, India
- Education: Baranagore Ramakrishna Mission Ashrama High School; Rabindra Bharati University
- Occupations: Actor, Director, Writer
- Years active: 2007–present
- Spouse: Kanyakumari Mukherjee (m. 2011; div. 2014) Debolina Dutta (m. 2014; sep. 2021)

Tathagata Mukherjee (born 15 May 1985) is a Kolkata-based Indian writer, director and actor. He is best known for his experimentation in Bengali Cinema and his acting performances as lead in various television shows.

== Early life ==
Tathagata Mukherjee was born on 15 May 1985, in Kolkata, India. During his childhood, he did a three years long yatra with a Bengali drag artist Chapal Bhaduri. He went to high school at the Baranagore Ramakrishna Mission Ashrama High School. Later, he studied drama at Rabindra Bharati University. He has done professional theatre since 2005.

== Career ==
His career as a film actor began when he was cast in the 2007 movie Laal Ronger Duniya.

In 2008, he started his television career as a hero in a daily soap called Sada Patay Kalo Daag. After that, he did many telefilms and soaps. Bou Kotha Kao (2009) became a turning point in his career. He then played lead characters in Payer Tolar Mati, Harano Sur, Kon Kanoner Phool, Sokhi, Choukath, and Care Kori Na. He did cameos in Agnipariksha and Tumi Asbe Bole. His filmmaking is influenced by Quentin Tarantino and Bengali Filmmaker Bratya Basu.

== Filmography ==
- Unicorn (2019)
- Bhotbhoti (2022)
- Pariah Volume 1: Every Street Dog Has a Name (2024)
- Memory X (Unreleased)
- Gopone Mod Chharan (Unreleased)
- Gaki (Unreleased)
- Raas (2025)

=== Short film ===
- Shuyopoka - The Inmate (Short film) (2016)
- Geodesy (2017)
- Buno (2018) Short film
- How To Become a Rapist (2018) Short film

=== Music video ===
- Jingle bells qwali (music video) (2017)
- Vandemataram and Kothbiro (Music video) (2017)
- Holi bol (Music video) (2017)
- Kalboishakhi (2018, musical)
- Make a Noise (2018, music video)

== Web series ==
- Water Bottle (2019, web series)

== Other works ==
=== As a writer ===
- Shuyopoka
- Geodesy
- Unicorn
- Buno
- " Warer bottle"
- " How to become a rapist"(origin of species)
- Gaki
- Memory X
- Gopone mod charan
- Pariah Volume 1: Every Street Dog Has a Name

=== As a cinematographar ===
- Jingle bells quwalli
- Make a noise
- Unicorn (foreign schedule)
- Gaki (Outdoor Schedule)

=== As an actor ===
- Badshahi Angti as Mahabir Seth
- Force as Shibaji
- Bastav as Rik
- Laal ronger Duniya as Himan
- The Best Seller
- Paan Supari as Sunny aka Sandip
- Parokiya as Bivas
- Sin Sister (2020) as Durjoy Mitra

== Television (daily soaps) ==
- Sada Patay Kalo Daag as Ayan
- Rajpoth
- Bou Kotha Kao as Rudro
- Payer Tolar Mati
- Kon Kanoner Phool as Manav
- Labonyer Sangsar
- Choukath
- Agnipariksha (guest appearance)
- Care Kori Na as Ronit
- Sokhi as Akash Majumder
- Harano Sur as Sudipto
- Raashi as Debobrato Bose, alias, Dev.
- Mon Niye Kachakachi as Ranbir Kapoor
- Tumi Asbe Bole (guest appearance)
- Sadhok Bamakhyapa as Tarapodo
- Swapno Udan as Arnob
- Bhakter Bhogobaan Shri Krishna as Duryodhon
- Raadha as Rana
- Kusum Dola as Kanaiha aka Krishnomoy
- Andarmahal as Tirthonkar
- Mayurpankhi as Shyam Sundar Ghosh aka Shyam
- Mohor as Ahir Dasgupta
- Kora Pakhi as Deepjoy
- Desher Maati as Dodo
- Guddi as Aabir Chatterjee aka Tutul
- Dhulokona as Ankur Chatterjee
- Tomar Khola Hawa as Arjo Roy
- Balijhor as Barshan
- Horogouri Pice Hotel as Khokan
- Love Biye Aaj Kal as Mallar
- Roshnai as Rajesh (Later replaced by Dipanjan Bhattacharya)
- Kon Se Aalor Swapno Niye as Rudra Singha Roy
- Rangamati Tirandaj
