= Tekka (soundtrack) =

2025 soundtrack album by Ranajoy Bhattacharjee

Soundtrack album by Ranajoy Bhattacharjee
- Released: 2024
- Recorded: 2023–24
- Studios: Ananjan's Studio, Kolkata; BBay Studios, Mumbai; Niyogi's Place, Kolkata
- Genre: Feature film soundtrack
- Length: 17:07
- Language: Bengali
- Label: Saregama
- Producer: Ranajoy Bhattacharjee
External audio
- Tekka Audio Jukebox on YouTube

Tekka is the soundtrack album composed primarily by Ranajoy Bhattacharjee, with a significant remastered contribution from Kabir Suman, to the 2024 Indian Bengali-language hostage thriller film of the same name directed by Srijit Mukherji. Produced by Dev Entertainment Ventures, the film stars Dev, Swastika Mukherjee and Rukmini Maitra. The film's background score was provided by Diptarka Bose.

The album was released on 21 January 2025, under the Saregama Bengali label. Lyrics were penned by Ranajoy himself with Suman and Barish. The soundtrack consists of four tracks, each receiving positive reception from critics and audience.

== Background and development ==
The musical landscape of Tekka underwent several creative shifts before its final release; Initially, the project was intended to be scored entirely by Anupam Roy, in his eleventh reunion with Srijit Mukherji after Autograph (2010), Baishe Srabon (2011), Hemlock Society (2012), Chotushkone (2014), Zulfiqar (2016), Uma (2018), Shah Jahan Regency (2019), Vinci Da (2019), Dwitiyo Purush (2020) and Dawshom Awbotaar (2023), however, following a change in the film's creative direction, Roy exited the film in June 2024. This led Mukherji to collaborate maidenly with Ranajoy Bhattacharjee for the songs and Diptarka Bose for the background score. Regarding his involvement with the film, Ranajoy stated "Composing music for Srijit Mukherji's songs is both challenging and tempting."

== Composition ==
=== Songs ===
The first song recorded for the film was "Tomay Chhere Jete Parlam Koi", sung by Anupam, who gave his consent to Ranajoy's approach to lend his voice. Though the song was initially written by Ranajoy as a love ballad, Mukherji conveyed it on the emotion of an unemployed man, which was played by Dev in the film. In an interview by Millennium Post, Ranajoy cited it as "the icing on the cake” to compose for Anupam.

Back then, I was involved in group theatre at around my 18. At that time, I fell deeply in love, with intense emotions; that love, which had come so suddenly, shattered just as suddenly. After the breakup, I was sanked into depression and made a futile attempt to hide my sadness by burying myself in work. It was at that time that Srijit Da's Hemlock Society released, where the male protagonist Ananda Kar helps those who are looking for a way to commit suicide to return to the path of life. I don't know how many people that film and that character saved from suicide in reality, but it certainly brought me back to the path of life.”

— Barish in an interview to Anandabazar Patrika

The second song "Taasher Deshe", which brought a satirical and theatrical energy to the album, mirroring the "game of cards" theme. It utilized a more aggressive, rhythmic arrangement compared to the other tracks. Barish, the lyricist of the song, considered himself to be engrossed into Mukherji's works.

A unique highlight of the soundtrack is the inclusion of "Theme Jete Jete". Mukherji, a reverence for Kabir Suman, wanted the original track to be remastered and re-contextualized from Suman's 1995 album Ghumou Baundule. This remastering was handled by Ranajoy with modern acoustic standards to fit the film's 2024 cinematic fidelity while retaining the philosophical weight of the original 1990s recording.

=== Score ===
Diptarka utilized a minimalist, pulse-driven electronic soundscape in the original score. It focused on "ticking clock" motifs using Analog Synthesizer and distorted bass loops to heighten the claustrophobia of the hostage situation. He worked to ensure that the score did not interfere with the film's high-stakes dialogue, opting for "sub-bass" textures that vibrate beneath the scenes rather than overt melodic themes.

== Release ==
The soundtrack features four tracks. The first song "Tomay Chhere Jete Parlam Koi" was released on 23 September 2024, coinciding with Mukherji's birthday. The second single "Taasher Deshe" was released on 2 October 2024 on the occasion of Mahalaya. The third single "Tomay Chhere Jete Parlam Koi (Female Version)" was released on 8 October 2024. "Theme Jete Jete", which was used in the opening credits, was released on 28 November 2024.

== Track listing ==
Track listing
No.	Title	Lyrics	Music	Singer(s)	Length
1.	"Theme Jete Jete"	Kabir Suman	Kabir Suman	Kabir Suman	2:54
2.	"Tomay Chhere Jete Parlam Koi"	Ranajoy Bhattacharjee	Ranajoy Bhattacharjee	Anupam Roy	4:46
3.	"Taasher Deshe"	Barish	Ranajoy Bhattacharjee	Timir Biswas	4:35
4.	"Tomay Chhere Jete Parlam Koi (Female Version)"	Ranojoy Bhattacharjee	Ranajoy Bhattacharjee	Rapurna Bhattacharya	4:52
Total length:					17:07

== Personnel ==
Song	Personnel
"Tomay Chhere Jete Parlam Koi"	Acoustic, Electric & Bass Guitars: John Paul; Violin: Sandipan Ganguly
"Taasher Deshe"	Acoustic & Electric Guitar: Suman Bagani
"Tomay Chhere Jete Parlam Koi (Female version)"	Harmonica: Srijit Mukherji; Acoustic, Electric & Bass Guitars: John Paul; Violin: Sandipan Ganguly

=== Production ===
- Song Composer: Ranajoy Bhattacharjee
- Background Score: Diptarka Bose
- Lyricists: Ranajoy Bhattacharjee, Kabir Suman, Barish
- Music Remastering: Ranajoy Bhattacharjee
- Arrangement & programming: Shamik Chakraborty
- Recording & Mixing: Shiladitya Sarkar
- Mastering Engineer: Ananjan Chakraborty
- Label: Saregama
