= Winkle Twinkle =

2026 Indian film by Srijit Mukherji

- Directed by: Srijit Mukherji
- Screenplay by: Srijit Mukherji; Padmanabha Dasgupta
- Story by: Bratya Basu
- Based on: Winkle Twinkle by Bratya Basu
- Produced by: Firdausul Hasan; Moni Shankar Ghosh
- Starring: Ritwick Chakraborty; Parambrata Chatterjee
- Cinematography: Indranath Marick
- Edited by: Srijit Mukherji
- Music by: Tamalika Golder; Prabuddha Banerjee
- Production companies: Friends Communication; Rajashree Productions
- Distributed by: PVR Inox Pictures
- Release date: 4 September 2026
- Running time: 123 minutes
- Country: India
- Language: Bengali

Winkle Twinkle is a 2026 Bengali-language political drama film directed and written by Srijit Mukherji. It is based on the play of the same name written by actor and playwright Bratya Basu. The film, produced by Firdausul Hasan under the banner of Friends Communication stars Ritwick Chakraborty and Parambrata Chatterjee in the lead roles. Later, Rajashree Productions collaborated with Communications to produce the film. In November 2024, Mukherji shared a poster for the film showing a broken statue of Vladimir Lenin with two actors sitting in front of it. Winkle Twinkle is one of Mukherji's films adapted from dramas, with his previous film adapting the play Julius Caesar. The film was distributed in Bengal by PVR Inox Pictures in theaters.

The film revolves around a father named Sabyasachi Sen and a son named Indra. It primarily focuses on Sen who disappears from police custody in January 1976, and later "reappears like Rip Van Winkle to find a completely transformed world and family." A teaser for the film lasting 1 minute 26 seconds was released on July 30, 2026. Winkle Twinkle is set for a release on September 4, 2026. A song for it was recorded by Shreya Ghoshal and Tamalika Golder. The film's shooting started some time after November 25, 2024 and was wrapped up by January 26, 2025. Several comments about the roles, plot and theme of it were issued by the director, actors and producer.

It was heard in mid-2023 that Srijit Mukherji would acquire the rights of the play by Bratya Basu and direct it into a film. However, the announcement of the film was made in November 2024 along with the caption that shooting would be started very soon. Basu commented that he had faith in Mukherji despite that his play was for the theater. Later, Anashua Majumdar and Angana Roy were stated to be included in the film cast. In December 2024, Shreya Ghoshal and Tamalika Golder recorded a song which Mukherji posted about on social media. Another song named "Na Thaka Priyo" from the film was released on YouTube focusing on the central theme of it and love, emotions. A new poster for the film was put out in April 2026 showing a blood bag with two bridges. The movie was originally set for release in January 2026.

== Background ==
The play Winkle Twinkle was written by Bratya Basu in 2002. The play portrays political conflict between a father who is ethical and upright and a son, who is unhesitant to compromise for his own benefit. In the same year Debesh Chattopadhyay adapted the play into a stage production with his own theater group. The play focused on Sabyasachi Sen who disappeared from police custody in 1976 and found himself 26 years later in 2002 standing against his son Indra on opposite political grounds.

== Plot ==
Sabyasachi Sen is a communist leader who is on the run from police, but manages to hide inside a factory where he falls asleep on the same day, in 1976. 26 years later, in 2002, a tea stall is installed in front of a former factory, where Ranjan and others chat and drink tea. Sabyasachi appears in front of Ranjan appearing to be unaware and oblivious of the world and his surroundings, believing that the year is still 1976. After making comments with Ranjan, he heads for his home in Jadavpur. On the way, he comes across some places that were under construction or nonexistent in 1976, getting confused as to how they were fully finished.

Sen talks with a tea stall owner and cannot believe how he has aged so much and also has no idea what a mobile phone is. Inside Sen's house, Indra and his sister have minor altercations after which they go to eat food served by their mother, Rajlokkhi. While they are in the middle of their lunch, Sabyasachi suddenly appears in front of them. Rajlokkhi feels emotional to have Sabyasachi back with them, who they believed died in 1976. A flashback of scenes of Rajlokkhi and Sabyasachi are shown in which they collaborate in communist movements. Indra leaves the house afterwards believing that Sen could not be alive and this was not his father.

Sabyasachi Sen has talks with Rajlokkhi (his wife) and Indra's sister (his daughter). They explain their identities to him since his daughter was not born when he disappeared and Indra was very small. Later Rajlokkhi and Sen talk privately about past events and new things and activities which have emerged after 26 years. While all the family members eat, Indra confronts Sen about disbeliefs he held believing that it was still 1976 and inform him that communism had a large downfall with Soviet Union falling in 1992. Indra goes to a club where he is revealed to be a member of the political party Trinamool Congress.

He sees flashback moments on the walls about when Rajlokkhi and he did work together for the Communist party. Amidst Sabyasachi's participation in a movement, he openly supports communism and stops his father's car, after which his father disowns him. Rajlokkhi comforts him in present time saying that his father missed him and regretted letting Sen go. Later, Sanat, a rich political leader who worked with Sen in previous times visits him; they exchange talks during a morning walk. Sanat sends Sen, his wife, and daughter to a public interview with a news anchor in which his daughter and wife speak but Sen refuses to talk about the matter.

Indra comes back home at night and converses with Sanat about their political affiliations, parties and ideologies. One morning, Sen goes to a rural-type area to pay a visit to Rajen and Bithi, his associates. Rajen sees Sen and comments that he has not changed in age of appearance, renouncing his belief that he died in 1976. He spends the day at his home conversing with him about their past involvements. Indra goes to a club office. In delusional sleep, Sabyasachi sees himself in a snowy, mountainous biome with Joseph Stalin and Vladimir Lenin, speaking about the core ideas of Communism.

Indra comes home drunk at night, confronting his father and raising questions about Sabyasachi's beliefs. Sen talks about how he made a young Indra fall asleep by singing a song. He blames the reason of his ruination and downfall on Sen's homecoming. They together go on a walk on a road overpass at midnight. After talking for a while, Indra takes out a handgun belonging to Sen and points at him. The lights suddenly go off and Sen sings the same song he used to sing when Indra was young. Indra shoots in the air. Sabyasachi is nowhere to be seen. Indra breaks down, finally believing that this was his real father, he leaves the area shortly. A few scenes of flashback later, Sen wakes up from beside the road sidewalk and takes a taxi to his home in Jadavpur. The time is 2025.

== Cast ==
Sources:

- Ritwick Chakraborty as Sabyasachi Sen
- Parambrata Chatterjee as Indra
- Anashua Majumdar as Rajlokkhi Sen
  - Sohini Sarkar as young Rajlokkhi
- Angana Roy as Indrani Sen
- Rajatava Dutta as Ranjan
- Debesh Chattopadhyay as Sanat
- Unmesh Ganguly (cameo)
- Satrajit Sarkar as Rajen (Note: "And Satrajit Sarkar who played Rajen is receiving a lot of praise from the public.")
- Bhadra Basu as Bithi, elder sister of Rajen
- Sandip Bhattacharya as Joseph Stalin (Note: "Sandip Bhattacharya in the role of Stalin has captivated the audience with even the few dialogues he spoke.")
- Moupia Nandy as a news anchor
- Partha Bhowmick

== Production and development ==
=== Announcements, songs and teaser ===
In mid-2023, it was heard that Srijit Mukherji might acquire rights to Bratya Basu's play to start and direct a film on it. Winkle Twinkle was confirmed to be made a real film in November 2024, with statements made by him. Mukherji released a poster in the same month with announcements that the film shooting would be starting very soon. It was speculated in the late-2023 that Anirban Bhattacharya might be playing a role in it, which was later proven false with the official names of the actors given out. Besides, it was reported by Sangbad Pratidin that Angana Roy will play the role of Indra's sister and Anashua Majumdar would also play a role inside it.

Srijit Mukherji confirmed that he would be directing and later releasing a new film based on a play by Bratya Basu on November 24, 2026, the day on which the film poster was released. The poster showed the symbol of hammer and sickle, along with a broken statue of Lenin with two people sitting in front of it, whose faces were not then revealed. Sources stated that Ritwick Chakraborty and Parambrata Chatterjee would be playing the lead roles, along with Anashua Majumdar and Angana Roy to play as actors. Bratya Basu said that his play Winkle Twinkle was written primarily for theaters. However he showed optimism about the upcoming film, "I am feeling happy. Even though I am quite skeptical, since this play was written mainly for theaters. However, I believe in Srijit. With his talent, he will be able to give Winkle Twinkle its own cinematic language." Producer Firdausul Hasan during this time bought the rights to the film. He stated that although the film is a political drama, it is an adaptation. The shooting was to start from January 2025.

On December 10, 2024, Mukherji posted pictures on social media from a recording studio remarking that singers Shreya Ghoshal and Tamalika Golder had recorded a song for the film. This recording followed his first poster release in November. Before the film, Ghoshal sung "Baundule Ghuri" for Mukherji's film Dawsham Abotaar in 2023. Golder made her singing debut with Mukherji's web series Durga Rohoshyo. A song was later released named "Na Thaka Priyo", although initially not suggested by Mukherji's post.

"Na Thaka Priyo" was another song from Winkle Twinkle, with lyrics by Srimoy Bhattacharya, music by Tamalika Golder, and vocals by Rapurna Bhattacharya. The song's theme describes the undying love between two lovers despite their physical distance. Piya Roy of The Telegraph wrote, "Na thaka priyo highlights how the bonds of true love and the memories of a beautiful and meaningful shared past can never fade away even when the lovers are physically distant from each other." The music video showed a family navigating through hardships of life, with the song pointing towards the grief, emotions and different ideologies of the members. With alignment to the theme of the film, the track indicates the pain of absence, the lover's memories, grief and emotional connection.

On April 23, 2026, Mukherji unveiled a new poster for Winkle Twinkle following his posting of a new poster for Emperor vs Sarat Chandra. The new film poster showed a blood bag where green color or blood mixed with red blood, with dense clouds in the background and the presence of Howrah Bridge and Vidyasagar Setu, the two bridges connecting Howrah with Kolkata. On the top, it was written that it was based on Bratya Basu's play. Names of the actors were written on different sides of the film poster.

A teaser for the film was released on July 30, 2026, offering glimpses to the upcoming film, a deeply moving drama centered on conflicts. The production companies commented: "Winkle Twinkle follows a man who returns to his family after decades of absence, setting off emotional fragmentation and bringing unresolved histories to the surface. While set against a political backdrop, the film is essentially a deeply personal story that explores the passage of time, generational divide, and the burden of one's convictions."

A trailer for Winkle Twinkle was released on August 27, 2026, by the production companies Friends Communication and Rajashree Productions. It showed the conflict between Sabyasachi and Indra along with several other scenes, along with other characters and crew listed in credits in the description. It further confirmed the roles of the actors. It generated popularity in Tollygunge as well as the general public and audience.

=== Actor comments and Bratya Basu's play ===
When Chakraborty saw the original play by Bratya Basu in theaters, he was young. Winkle Twinkle, adapting the story of the original play served as an added attraction to the drama staged in theaters. Sabyasachi Sen, which he portrayed, put Chakraborty in a lot of challenges, according to him "A man who wakes up after 26 years, seeing the society and politics around him to have been changed". According to him, since this is not possible in real-life, Ritwick had no experience and was not familiar with the concept. He tried to figure out how he should play the role of the character and searched for an understanding throughout the film.

Angana Roy commented that she was happy to act in Winkle Twinkle and said that Mukherji wanted to work with her for a long time. Roy was selected for the film cast at a time when she was recovering from health issues. Mukherji gave her a note and part of the film script as a official actor. She had a checklist of film directors she wanted to work with, which also contained the name of Mukherji. Before the film shooting began, Roy checked the text of Bratya Basu's play and watched a YouTube video of it. With her first day on the film, Mukherji told her that the audience would not expect anything similar to Basu's play and gave her liberty to act in her way.

Mukherji stated that he felt good working with Ritwick Chakraborty in his film. In their collaboration in it, Mukherji communicated with Chakraborty through his wife Aparajita Ghosh Das, remarking that it was a bit hard for him to reach Chakraborty. Mukherji said that he was welcome to accept challenges to feature him in his films, stating that his acting skills and performance were impressive in the Bengali cinema, according to the director.

Bratya Basu finished writing his play Winkle Twinkle in January 2002. It was staged in July 2002 in a theater group named "Laketown Sanskriti", with its director being Debesh Chattopadhyay (Chatterjee). Bratya Basu said that he originally wrote the play on recommendation of Chatterjee. After it was formally staged and adapted into a theater play in July 2002, it gained popularity. Before 25 years passed from Basu's play being staged, Srijit Mukherji wanted to make a film about it in theaters and asked for rights to the play. Basu stated that he was overjoyed to hear it. The director also asked Basu to act in the film, which he denied; he had also never played a role in the original play. In his place, actor Rajatava Dutta acted. Mukherji faced problems on the film with censor boards for its political themes and scenes, with its release on September in movie theaters over Bengal.

=== Last days of filming and post-production ===
In January 2025, Srijit Mukherji brought the actors and Bratya Basu in a single area and took photos on occasion of the last day of the film's shooting. A narrow lane in Dum Dum, Kolkata was crowded from morning on January 25. Extra activities started from afternoon when Basu arrived in a white van and met the director of the film. Crews from Anandabazar Patrika arrived on the set. Basu on the day showed optimism when he was sitting on a chair behind a monitor. Mukherji said that he was quite fascinated to work on the play written by Basu. He said that Basu had given him full independence to adapt the drama since he liked Mukherji's works.

Devshankar Halder, an actor in the original play in 2002 commented that he wants to see Winkle Twinkle be adapted into a film in a positive way. Halder was offered to act in the film by the director, but he denied because of lack of time. He spoke that he wants to see the film in a positive perspective. Debesh Chattopadhyay entered the shooting unit some time later from another side. Preparation for shooting the interior scenes was made by the unit, after which Mukherji called a lunch break. Among the actors, Anashua Majumdar and Angana Roy were also present inside the unit. Mukherji wanted to pay a homage to the original play of 2002, for which he declared Debesh Chattopadhyay and Rajatava Dutta to be playing special roles for the film. Actor Parambrata Chatterjee was found in front of a makeup van; his shooting was to start later. According to Chatterjee, Winkle Twinkle highlights the ideology of the leftists. "Leftists need to have a presence in the not only the state but whole country. This film points towards the reasons as to why they left the government." Ritwick Chakraborty outside the unit commented that though he had seen the original play, he wanted to forget that experience to act better in the film and not conflict with the events he had seen at the original play.

Srijit Mukherji remarked that he decided to make the play into a film after watching it for the first time at the age of 25 [in 2002]. He said that he believed that the film does not lean towards any political party, further saying "This play is like a metaphor to me. So I believe that it is relevant regardless of country or time. Abhinandan Datta of Ananbazar wrote that he was happy to have everyone on set at the last day. Mukherji stated that shooting would continue till midnight, and said that that they had to finish it on time.

In an interview, Mukherji commented that he worked with two timelines: the 1970s and 2002, besides featuring another timeline which he did not reveal. He said that he heavily borrowed the dialogues of the original play to feature in the film, and stated that it was the play's dialogue that drove him to make the film in the first place. He gave Bratya Basu the credit of dialogue writer in the film. He said that filming was hard in the roads because the walls were painted in shades of blue and white, which was initiated by Trinamool Congress. He allotted a large sum of money to whitewash the walls visually through VFX. Mukherji also commented that recreating the earlier periods were easier than the recent years. He stated that he faced several risks in making the political film, which often suffer censorship by certification boards, saying that Winkle Twinkle also suffered consequences because of its political theme.

Rupak Mishra in an article about the film writes that it is incredibly difficult to portray Bengal, especially Kolkata in both the 1970s and 2002 in the same film. Mishra states that the colors of the graffiti, symbols on the walls, characteristics of the streets and festoons of different political parties identify the main differences between the two eras. While this can be fixed with symbolic reconstruction in theaters, several visual problems rise on digital screens. The film was entirely shot when Trinamool Congress formed the state government, with many walls and surfaces being covered with "blue and white". Mishra writes that the atmosphere needed to convey the Left Front rule was absent from the setting and film.

== Themes ==
Winkle Twinkle was described as a political drama film featuring themes and scenes of multiple political parties. However, Srijit Mukherji and Ritwick Chakraborty denied the film having associations and alignments to a single specific political party. The film is based on the clash and conflicts between Sabyasachi and Indra, a generational conflict which was also conceived in the original 2002 drama. Chakraborty played his role in the film and commented that a person can inhibit an ideology without endorsing it. According to Mukherji, the separate ideologies held by Sabyasachi and Indra are to be balanced and fair with each other.

A trailer for the film was released on August 27, 2026 by Friends Communication, which according to Piya Roy "sets a deeply serious, dramatic and dialogue-driven tone that derives its energy from the thought-provoking subjects it concerns itself with". It was a portrayal of drama and emotions that offered a complimentary glimpse to the film. Mukherji based parts of the film on contemporary settings, referring to real-life events and situations. The central theme raised questions on "morality, political loyalty and faith in public leadership" where decisions are driven by economic considerations. Parambrata Chatterjee's role of Indra depicted signs of impatience, cynicism and generational failure, and hinted at disillusionments and worries of modern youth, prevalent in his tensional conflicts with Sabyasachi (played by Chakraborty).

Sen's return after 26 years indicates emotional fragmentation and unresolved histories. The questions raised by it are more of a personal character rather than a full political label. The questions are described to be of: time, generational drift and about "how personal convictions can gradually become burdens".

The movie in its themes focused on an idealist and revolutionary who got dropped into the future which he never witnessed. It has no targets of portraying mechanics of time-travel. A popular scene of the film involvs a merry-go round, showing Chatterjee and Chakraborty sitting on separate horses while it circles. Sanjali Brahma writes about the scenes: "It is an almost absurdly playful image carrying a rather weighty idea: history going round and round, old faces watching from the sidelines while successive generations inherit, question, dilute or reinvent the ideologies that shaped their parents' lives." Rather than showing political history directly by heroes, villains, it concentrates on "what prolonged proximity to power can do to ideals".

== Music ==
All songs except "Janlar Kanche" are composed by Tamalika Golder, including a few instrumental ones. Srimoy Bhattacharya and Tamalika Golder wrote the songs. The background score is made by Prabuddha Banerjee. The song "Janlar Kanche" is written, composed and sung by Kabir Suman (Suman Chattopadhyay).

Track listing
| No. | Title | Lyrics | Music | Singer(s) | Length |
|---|---|---|---|---|---|
| 1. | "Na Thaka Priyo" | Srimoy Bhattacharya | Tamalika Golder | Rapurna Bhattacharya | 4:08 |
| 2. | "Je Andhare" | Tamalika Golder | Tamalika Golder | Shreya Ghoshal | 4:30 |
| 3. | "Rip Van Winkle" | Srimoy Bhattacharya | Tamalika Golder | Sudip Nandy, Tamalika Golder | 3:25 |
| 4. | "Jodi Tomay Dwidha Dwonde" | Srimoy Bhattacharya | Tamalika Golder | Rupankar Bagchi | 3:03 |
| 5. | "Winkle Twinkle - Theme Song" | (None) | Tamalika Golder | (None) | 3:20 |
| 6. | "Je Andhare - Reprise Version" | Tamalika Golder | Tamalika Golder | Sanchita Bhowmick, Tamalika Golder | 4:02 |
| 7. | "Janlar Kanche" | Kabir Suman | Kabir Suman | Kabir Suman | 2:55 |

== Marketing ==
On September 12, 2026, a part of the crew and cast of Winkle Twinkle appeared on the television quiz show Dadagiri Unlimited, hosted by actor Dev. The show was hosted on Saturday evening (September 12). Personalities and crew present in the show were Ritwick Chakraborty, Bratya Basu, Debesh Chatterjee, Moupia Nandy, Anashua Majumdar, Angana Roy and Rapurna Bhattacharya. Along with a brief story of the film, the show included conversations about life experiences, events and general talk. According to the channel, the "special attraction" of the episode would be the questions that Moupia Nandu would ask Dev. The episode also included questions and talks of Ritwick Chakraborty with Dev, with occasional talks about their work together.

== Release ==
Winkle Twinkle was premiered at a cinema multiplex in Kolkata, which was attended by Ritwick Chakraborty, Parambrata Chatterjee, Angana Roy, Anashua Majumdar and other members from the movie crew. On August 27, 2026, the trailer of it was launched and shown in the Open Air Theater department of Jadavpur University in Kolkata. The information about the story and characters was largely lacking during this time, which led to the film's popularity being generated by Mukherji's direction and the cast of the film. Most of the film's main cast was present during the show. Besides, two songs from the movie itself were released on that same day.

With its original release date set for January 2026, the film release was stopped by the film censor board and delayed by six months, after which a release date of September 4, 2026 was officially confirmed after an agreement with the board and the filmmakers. The film was released in theaters on September 4, 2026, a Friday. It was released simultaneously with four other films in English and Hindi in theaters in India, which were the Indian action film Mirzapur: The Movie, the Indian comedy film Jeevan Ya Bheema Con?, the American action film Onslaught, and the English fantasy film The Magic Faraway Tree.

== Reception ==
Pratyusha Pan of Maktoob Media writes that the performance of Ritwick Chakraborty carries the film's weight, portraying a man who straddles between two eras, saying "The film is occasionally uneven in its willingness to let its characters simply talk through the ideas. Several scenes lean on dense, discursive exchanges about ideology that appear too unnatural for regular conversation, will already be familiar to those already fluent in Bengal's political vocabulary, and unintelligible to those who are not." She writes that the film poster showing a blood bag with two bridges in the background show that a body is being "kept alive in borrowed blood". Author and educationist Sarojesh Mukherjee remarks about the film "What makes its satire both engaging and unsettling is its eerie resonance with present-day Bengal, where yesterday’s defeated wielders of power coexist with remarkable ease alongside their former adversaries—now their overlords. The old battle lines have blurred once again; what endures is the instinct to adapt, survive and, perhaps, belong to whoever holds power." Anindita Acharya in a review in MillenniumPost remarked that Winkle Twinkle is filled "with some of the finest performances seen in recent Bengali cinema". Acharya writes that the scene of Sabyasachi waking up from the sidewalk and when young Rajlokkhi emerges from behind the old Rajlokkhi to be great scenes of the film. She praises the song "Na Thaka Priyo". She stated that she liked the way Mukherji made the love story between Sen and Rajlokkhi.

Agnivo Niyogi of The Telegraph praises the performance of Chakraborty in his conveyance of a man "who has become a stranger in his own world" and Parambrata Chattejee, who plays the role of Indra and provides him with "the necessary arrogance and restlessness". Niyogi states that the songs composed by Tamalika Golder have a gentle and dreamlike quality that helps bridge the connection of the past to the present, concluding the review by saying "By the time Winkle Twinkle reaches its final act, the political argument becomes something closer to an elegy. The film is asking what happens to people who devote their lives to an ideal when that ideal itself becomes unfashionable, compromised or forgotten. That question stays with you long after Sabyasachi’s journey comes to an end." Sharmistha Ghosal of Indulge Express rated the film 4.5 out of 5 stars and commented that the camera work, cinematography, the merge of stage and screen, dialogues, in-sync background music and the songs of the film leave an impression. Ghoshal writes that the casting selected by the director was remarkable, saying that none of the actors fell out of sync from their roles. She praises the acting range of Chakraborty. She further writes that Anashua Majumdar, Angana Roy, Rajatava Dutta and Debesh Chattopadhyay remain unmatched in their expressions and performances.

Raima Ganguly of The Times of India rated the film 3.5 out of 5 stars, remarking that Mukherji's greatest achievement is the film's visual language, stating that the throwbacks to the 1970s inside the film are "especially striking". She writes that the cinematography is among the greatest remarkable features of Winkle Twinkle, commenting "Several frames have a visual imagination that frequently pushes the narrative into a dreamlike territory". Ganguly considers the music, songs and background music to be central to the theme of it, and are important. She highlights Chakraborty's performance, calling it to be the film's emotional anchor. She further writes that watching the film demands patience, stating that the second half stretches more than necessary. Ranjan Bandyopadhyay of Sangbad Pratidin comments in his film review "This rare Bengali film is a sweet blend of the talents and tendencies of director Srijit Mukherjee and playwright Bratya Basu. I have never seen such a lyrical political film before. Bandyopadhyay calls Chakraborty's role to be challenging and writes that no one could have been better than him, concluding his review with "[...] I personally think that the film is a picture of our relationship with time. Once that relationship is severed, it cannot be repaired and returned. We have to become dead people of dead time. The creator has been able to portray this issue with outstanding skill, perhaps for the first time in Indian cinema. Another thing, I want to go back to the film for the intoxicating pull of Rapurna's song."

A correspondent from Aajkaal commented in a film review that Mukherji chose to make the film on a political topic during the "turbulent times" the movie was released in, describing that "This is such a difficult socio-economic, relationship-based political play, it is an impossible task to capture it on camera, he wanted to create it, and he has to be thanked for that." The critic writes that Mukherji did not make any special changes to the film besides mixing the dialogue and flashbacks, also praising the acting performed by Ritwick Chakraborty. The critic praised the background music and songs and the editing done by Mukherji, also remarking that the screenplay written by Mukherji and Padmanabha Dasgupta remain largely relevant to the original drama of 2002. Film critic Subhash K. Jha said in a review of the film on The Statesman that "the supporting cast feels like an intrusion", describing the part in the film with Joseph Stalin to be forcibly positioned when Winkle Twinkle is about a father–son conflict. Jha writes that the film itself reminded him of director Mrinal Sen's political films Interview, Calcutta 71 and others. Describing parts of the film and some of its scenes, Jha writes:" Although the narrative tends to get heavy handed at times, the quintessential political parable is anchored to a plaintive persuasive predicament." Deepanvita Mukhopadhyay Ghosh of Aaro Ananda remarks that the dialogues of the film were excellent, which were revamped by Mukherji. Ghosh praised the film's color palette, the cinematographer and the colorist, writing that "the contrast of the visuals makes the impact of the contrasting parts of the story even stronger". Ghosh further remarks that the climax of Winkle Twinkle is also unique. She highlights a few scenes from the movie, stating them as "memorable".

== See also ==
- Emperor vs Sarat Chandra – adapted from Pather Dabi.
- Shotyi Bole Shotyi Kichhu Nei – adapted from Twelve Angry Men.
- Pratidwandi – Bengali film featuring communism.
