= Shotyi Bole Shotyi Kichhu Nei =

2025 Indian Bengali legal thriller film by Srijit Mukherji

- Theatrical release poster
- Directed by: Srijit Mukherji
- Adapted from: 12 Angry Men (1957); Ek Ruka Hua Faisla (1986)
- Screenplay by: Srijit Mukherji
- Dialogues by: Srijit Mukherji
- Produced by: Shrikant Mohta; Mahendra Soni
- Starring: Parambrata Chatterjee; Kaushik Ganguly; Kaushik Sen; Ritwick Chakraborty; Ananya Chatterjee; Anirban Chakrabarti; Arjun Chakraborty; Rahul Arunoday Banerjee; Kanchan Mullick; Sauraseni Maitra; Phalguni Chatterjee; Suhotra Mukherjee
- Cinematography: Prosenjit Chowdhury
- Edited by: Sanglap Bhowmik
- Music by: Music: Amit Chatterjee; Background Score: Subhadeep Guha
- Production company: Shree Venkatesh Films
- Distributed by: Shree Venkatesh Films
- Release date: 23 January 2025
- Country: India
- Language: Bengali
- Box office: est.₹1.72 crore

Shotyi Bole Shotyi Kichhu Nei (transl. There is nothing truly true), later known with the parenthesis If Truth Be Told, and also known by the initialism SBSKN, is a 2025 Indian Bengali-language surrealist legal thriller film written and directed by Srijit Mukherji. Produced by Shrikant Mohta and Mahendra Soni under the banner of Shree Venkatesh Films, the film is an official adaptation of the 1986 Hindi film Ek Ruka Hua Faisla, which is itself a remake of the American film 12 Angry Men (1957) directed by Sidney Lumet, which was an adaptation from a 1954 teleplay of the same name by Reginald Rose. It stars an ensemble cast of Kaushik Ganguly, Parambrata Chatterjee, Kaushik Sen, Ritwick Chakraborty, Anirban Chakrabarti, Ananya Chatterjee, Arjun Chakrabarty, Rahul Banerjee, Sauraseni Maitra, Kanchan Mullick, Phalguni Chatterjee and Suhotra Mukhopadhyay.

The film follows the titular twelve members of a jury as they deliberate a supposedly clear-cut murder trial and details the tension among them when one juror argues that the defendant might not be guilty. The film shares its title with the line "Ashole Shotyi Bole Shotyi Kichhu Nei" from the song "Ei Srabon", written and composed by Anupam Roy, from Mukherji's 2011 film Baishe Srabon. Principal photography commenced in June 2024 and wrapped in July 2024 being one of the shortest shot Bengali films. Amit Chatterjee composed its soundtrack, while Subhadeep Guha did the background score. The cinematography and editing of the film were handled by Prosenjit Chowdhury and Sanglap Bhowmik respectively.

Shotyi Bole Shotyi Kichhu Nei theatrically released on 23 January, 2025 coinciding with Netaji Jayanti, opening to positive reviews with critics appreciating the performances by the whole cast, runtime, characterization and the thrill used in the screenplay along with direction.

== Plot ==
Shotyi Bole Shotyi Kichhu Nei is a Bengali-language legal thriller that unfolds primarily within the subconscious mind of Brajeswar Dutta, a High Court judge in West Bengal. The story begins at Brajeswar's birthday party at his upscale Kolkata residence, attended by a diverse group of friends and family members, each representing varied social, cultural, and professional backgrounds. The guests include:

- His daughter, Arundhati, a outspoken feminist film director
- His son, Abir, a socially awkward physics professor
- Dhiman, a rational economist working for the World Bank, and his wife Roopa, a snobbish advertising executive
- Gaurang Aggarwal, a wealthy Marwari businessman
- Sadiq, a successful Muslim folk-fusion singer
- Sumit Bhattacharya, a right-wing political activist and survivor of communal riots
- Tapash, Brajeswar's loyal personal assistant
- Habul, an elderly family friend residing in an old-age home
- Kaushik, a young corporate executive and Brajeswar's nephew

During the gathering, Brajeswar appears distracted and uneasy, alluding to a high-profile murder case he is presiding over involving the stabbing of an elderly man by a young Muslim boy named Noor Islam and his elder brother. He reflects on the historical abolition of the jury system in India, following the 1973 case of Nanavati v. State of Maharashtra, expressing a nostalgic curiosity about how a jury might have deliberated such a verdict.

As the party winds down and the guests leave, Brajeswar dozes off in his armchair. The narrative then transitions into a surreal dream sequence within his subconscious, where the departed guests inexplicably return and are joined by a mysterious new figure, Satya, a flamboyant homosexual fashion designer who acts as the group's provocateur and moral compass. In this dream world, the twelve individuals—now transformed into a jury—must deliberate the guilt or innocence of Noor Islam in a confined, jury-room-like setting. The deliberation is not static; the environment fluidly shifts across symbolic locations drawn from Brajeswar's memories and psyche, including his study, a golf course, a theater where he once viewed a stage adaptation of 12 Angry Men, a rain-swept flyover from a past act of kindness, a family beach vacation spot, and a dense tropical forest from an old expedition.

- Sumit's experiences with communal violence fuel his Islamophobia, leading to explosive confrontations with Sadiq and accusations of bias;
- Arundhati's history of sexual assault clashes with Gaurang's patriarchal and classist attitudes, highlighting gender and regional divides;
- Dhiman's logical detachment is challenged by emotional outbursts from Roopa and others, revealing cracks in intellectual facades;
- Abir's passivity gives way to quiet insights, while Kaushik struggles to moderate the chaos as the de facto foreman;
- Tapash and Habul provide grounded, empathetic perspectives, drawing from their loyalty and age-old wisdom.

Through psychological confrontations, flashbacks, and metaphorical shifts in the dreamscape, the film explores the fluidity of truth, the impact of personal demons on judgment, and the intersections of justice, morality, and humanity. The deliberations serve as a microcosm of contemporary Indian society's fractures—communalism, caste, gender inequality, and urban elitism—culminating in a tense examination of collective conscience and individual accountability. The narrative blurs the lines between reality and illusion, with Satya's enigmatic connection to Brajeswar's past adding layers of introspection, ultimately prompting the judge (and the audience) to question the very nature of truth and verdict in an imperfect world.

== Cast ==
- Kaushik Ganguly as Brajeswar Dutta, judge of High Court of West Bengal (Based on Juror #3)
- Kaushik Sen as Dhiman, an economist and friend of Brajeswar (Based on Juror #4)
- Parambrata Chatterjee as Satya, a homosexual fashion designer with a mysterious link with Brajeswar's past (Based on Juror #8)
- Ritwick Chakraborty as Sumit Bhattacharya, victim of communal riots as well as a supporter of right-wing politics (Based on Juror #10)
- Ananya Chatterjee as Roopa, a snooty socialite (Based on Juror #12)
- Anirban Chakrabarti as Gaurang Aggarwal, a Marwari businessman (Based on Juror #11)
- Rahul Arunoday Banerjee as Sadiq, a well-to-do Muslim folk singer, producing folk-fusion music albums (Based on Juror #5)
- Arjun Chakrabarty as Kaushik, a corporate employee and nephew of Brajeswar (Based on Juror #1/Foreman)
- Sauraseni Maitra as Arundhati, a feminazi film director and daughter of Brajeswar (Based on Juror #7)
- Kanchan Mullick as Taposh, man friday of Brajeswar (Based on Juror #6)
- Phalguni Chatterjee as Habul, elder brother considered by Brajeswar who stays in a dilapidated old-age home (Based on Juror #9)
- Suhotra Mukhopadhyay as Abir, an unopinionated underdog physics professor and son of Brajeswar (Based on Juror #2)
- Noor Islam as the accused kid
- Koushik Kar as the elder brother of the kid

== Production ==
=== Development ===
Srijit Mukherji was actively involved with the English professional theatre circuit in Delhi and Bengaluru besides working as an economist and statistician. Thus in 2006, Srijit Mukherji had adapted Twelve Angry Men, under the title as Mindgame, which was also directed by himself at Alliance Française De Bangalore the same year. After making his directorial debut with Autograph in 2010, he had planned to make a film on it. Anjan Dutt and Rituparno Ghosh were his first choice to play two of the major characters, with Chiranjeet Chakraborty, Swastika Mukherjee, Roopa Ganguly, Rudranil Ghosh, Sujan Neel Mukherjee and Kanchan Mullick being in another major roles. In 2012, he revealed the title of the film imagined as Dozen in an interview to The Telegraph on the promotion of his film Hemlock Society. It was to go on floors in December 2013, but got shelved because of Ghosh's death in May 2013. According to Mukherji, it was difficult to cast any other actor to replace Ghosh in that character, as it was originally written keeping Ghosh in mind. He also disagreed to bring some changes in the characteristics as it had a special impact in its story. On the other hand, Ghosh also was to star in Mukherji's another venture Chotushkone (2014) in a specific role, which was later finalized having Parambrata Chatterjee as Ghosh's replacement.

In December 2023, it was reported that Mukherji was reworking on the shelved project entitled as Shotyi Bole Shotyi Kichhu Nei. It was officially announced in February 2024, under the production of Shree Venkatesh Films. The muharat of the film held on 4 March 2024, where Mukherji considered the film to be his dream project.

"Issues which have snowballed over the last 18 years have found prominence in my film. References to the overall politics of the country have been added and one thing which I want to point out is that, like many things have changed in the new text, many things have remained the same. They have become bigger, darker and uglier. I have tried to address those issues by escalating the pitch and tenor of those conflicts [...] And I was not trying to be politically correct by giving representation to the various sections of the society."

— Srijit Mukherji on restarting the film as "Shotyi Bole Shotyi Kichhu Nei" at The Telegraph

=== Casting ===
Anjan Dutt approached for the role which he was to portray in Dozen, but he had to decline it as he thought that his real age might mismatch with the character. Then Kaushik Ganguly came on the board, reuniting with Mukherji eleven years after Chotushkone in 2014, where he had a guest appearance. In the screenplay section of the film, Mukherji took some suggestions from Ganguly, whom he considers to be his teacher-like in the field of screenwriting. Ritwick Chakraborty and Rudranil Ghosh were reported to be roped in, both of them reuniting with the director six years after Vinci Da (2019), in their third and fifth collaborations respectively. Later, Ghosh's involvement with the film was revealed to be a rumour, and Rahul Arunoday Banerjee came as his alternative. Ananya Chatterjee and Sauraseni Maitra joined the cast in January 2024, replacing Roopa Ganguly and Swastika Mukherjee respectively from Dozen. On the other hand, Satyam Bhattacharya and Riddhi Sen were revealed to play another pivotal roles, both of whom got replaced by Suhotra Mukherjee and Arjun Chakrabarty respectively for unknown reasons.

In February 2024, Anirban Chakrabarti and Phalguni Chatterjee joined the film. The character which was to be portrayed by Rituparno Ghosh before, was reported having Anirban Bhattacharya in it. Chiranjeet Chakraborty, who was rumoured to be a part of the film, got replaced by Kaushik Sen. In May 2024, Adrit Roy was reported to feature in the film, which was later proved to be a rumour. The same month, Bhattacharya opted out of the project due to his date issues and Parambrata Chatterjee came on the board replacing him. The final casting was revealed on 23 May 2024.

The initial cast when Mukherji intended to make this film was (respectively according to juror no.) Kaushik Ganguly, Srijato, Anjan Dutt, Dipankar De, Ritwick Chakraborty, Kanchan Mullick, Swastika Mukherjee, Rituparno Ghosh, Manoj Mitra, Rudranil Ghosh, Biswajit Chakraborty and Roopa Ganguly.

=== Filming ===
Principal photography of the film began on 10 June 2024 in Kolkata. On the first day of shooting, veteran actor Phalguni Chatterjee met with an accident during the shot of an action sequence with shattering glass. He got hurt when the glass shattered having severe cuts on his leg, hands, and face and he bled profusely. The shooting of the film was imagined to postponed as Chatterjee had two stitches on his leg, while it didn't happen as he rejoined the shooting the next day.

On 18 June 2024, production moved to Puri with the schedule for a week. With the main twelve cast members, a particular scene was shot on the beach. After the completion of the schedule, filming wrapped there on 26 June 2024.

=== Post-production ===
Post-production began on mid-August 2024, as Mukherji was busy in the promotion of his previous film Tekka (2024). On 30 September 2024, Kaushik Ganguly started dubbing his portions for the film first. Subhadeep Guha began re-recording the film's background score during mid-July 2023.

== Soundtrack ==
Shotyi Bole Shotyi Kichhu Nei

Soundtrack album by Amit Chatterjee
- Released: 2025
- Recorded: 2024
- Genre: Feature film soundtrack
- Language: Bengali
- Label: SVF

The soundtrack of the film is composed by Amit Chatterjee, while Subhadeep Guha provided its score.

The score featured in the teaser is a rendition of the music of the song, Shchedryk, written by the Ukrainian composer Mykola Leontovych in 1914.

The first single "Tomar Ghawre Bawshot Kawre " was released on 17 January 2025. It is an adaptation of the song with the same name, originally composed by Zahid Ahmed.

Track listing
No.	Title	Lyrics	Singer(s)	Length
1.	"Tomar Ghawre Bawshot Kawre"	Zahid Ahmed	Rapurna Bhattacharyya	2:46
2.	"Murshid Piya"		Sameer	3:08
Total length:				6:04

== Marketing ==
The first looks of a total of twelve characters from Shotyi Bole Shotyi Kichhu Nei, each with six were released in two phases; the first on 27 June, which revealed Parambrata Chatterjee, Ritwick Chakraborty, Ananya Chatterjee, Arjun Chakrabarty, Phalguni Chatterjee and Kanchan Mullick, and the second on 28 June 2024 which revealed Kaushik Ganguly, Kaushik Sen, Anirban Chakrabarti, Sauraseni Maitra, Rahul Arunoday Banerjee and Suhotra Mukherjee. On 20 December 2024, the makers announced the release date of the film with a poster.

The teaser of the film was released on 23 December 2024, which had a controversial response because of using the theme music of Lentovych's 1916 composition Shchedyrk, while it was revealed to be official. The trailer of the film was launched at an event at Kolkata Town Hall on 13 January 2025, where the cast members and Mukherji were spotted dressed in striking black-and-white attire.

== Release ==
=== Theatrical ===
The film was initially rumoured to be released on Christmas 2024. However, the film released on 23 January 2025 on the occasion of Netaji Jayanti, after the makers announced its date with the unveiling of a poster.

=== Home media ===
The film is scheduled to have its digital premier on "Hoichoi" on 18 April 2025.

== Reception ==
Sudeep Ghosh of Anandabazar Patrika rated the film 8.5 out of 10 stars and wrote "Srijit Mukherji deserves special praise for moulding the screenplay in a modern set piece. The dream angle added by Srijit takes the film out of the monotony of the four walls and sets the discussion in various locations, which makes opportunity for a brilliant camera work." He also praised the acting acumen of each of the twelve actors and their uniquely written characters in the story by Mukherjee. Subhasmita Kanji of Hindustan Times rated the film 4.5/5 stars and opined "Mukherjee has pulled a seasoned caste where the 12 people are not same, each one represents a different cast, religion, language, sexual orientation, etc. Every actor has shrewdly done their roles." She specially praised the director for integrating the song Tomar Ghawre Boshot Kore Koyjona into the film to show the breaking of the four walls of a room which metaphorically represented the breaking of the barriers of our insular mind.

Sampali Moulik of Sangbad Pratidin reviewed the film and termed it as one of the best of Mukherjee's works. She noted "A dialogue dependent film, every character has a proper past, aspiration and vulnerability, which is supported by a strong screenplay. The suppressed tension in the jury is aptly carried throughout the film by the seasoned acting of the 12 actors, the cinematography by Halder and the accompanying song by Rapurna." Abhirup Ghosh of t2 Online reviewed the film and expressed "Shotyi Bole Shotyi Kichhu Nei is vintage Srijit Mukherji! Terrific dialogues, landed through tremendous performances by the entire cast, make this a super intriguing watch." He praised the dialogues with their wordplay and puns, Bhowmik’s precise yet stylised editing, intense yet funny conflicts and arguments between the different characters and also termed it as a "rare multi-starrer where each cast member gets almost equal prominence and ample moments to shine."

Poorna Banerjee of The Times of India addressed Parambrata Chatterjee's character as "the conscience of human mind". She rated it 4/5 stars and quoted "Mukherji’s script weaves various subplots seamlessly into the narrative. Some of these unfold subtly in the background, adding layers of intrigue to the scenes. His meticulous framing allows multiple stories to coexist within a single shot. The film challenges not just its characters but also the audience, urging them to scrutinise evidence and confront their own biases. It prompts viewers to reflect on the myriad faces they encounter daily and the unseen truths beneath." She also praised the performances by the cast members, cinematography and especially its music which evoked familiarity. According to Agnivo Niyogi of The Telegraph, the star of the film is Parambrata Chatterjee. He noted "The exchanges between the characters are taut, filled with tension and layered with thoughtful reflections, and the focus shifts from the accused to the decision-making process that is as flawed as the social systems that this motley bunch of people are a part of." Adding the film to be one of the best directorials in Mukherji's career, he wrote that the use of shadow and light emphasised the moral ambiguity at the heart of the film.
