= Cop Universe =

Cop Universe may refer to:

- Rohit Shetty's Cop Universe
- Srijit Mukherji's Cop Universe
