= Dwitiyo Purush (film) =

Indian Bengali psychological thriller film by Srijit Mukherji

- Theatrical release poster
- Directed by: Srijit Mukherjee
- Written by: Suvonkar Banerjee, Srijit Mukherji
- Screenplay by: Srijit Mukherji
- Story by: Suvonkar Banerjee and Srijit Mukherji
- Produced by: Shree Venkatesh Films
- Starring: Parambrata Chatterjee; Raima Sen; Anirban Bhattacharya; Gaurav Chakrabarty
- Cinematography: Soumik Halder
- Edited by: Pronoy Dasgupta
- Music by: Anupam Roy
- Production company: Shree Venkatesh Films
- Distributed by: Shree Venkatesh Films
- Release date: 23 January 2020
- Running time: 128 minutes
- Country: India
- Language: Bengali
- Box office: est. ₹5 Crore

Dwitiyo Purush is a 2020 Indian Bengali language neo-noir psychological action thriller film written and directed by Srijit Mukherji and produced by Shree Venkatesh Films. The film stars Parambrata Chatterjee, Raima Sen, and Anirban Bhattacharya. It is a sequel to the 2011 crime thriller, Baishe Srabon. The film follows the pursuit of a new serial killer, Khoka, by Abhijit Pakrashi.

Dwitiyo Purush was theatrically released on 23 January 2020, as a tribute to detective writers, Agatha Christie and Arthur Conan Doyle. The film soon attained a cult status owing to the character of Khoka, considered to be a career-defining performance by Bhattacharya, as well as for featuring one of the most shocking and unforgettable twist ending in the history of Bengali cinema. Despite the polarising nature of the film, it is considered by critics and fans alike to be one of the best sequels created by Mukherji.

In October 2023, Dawshom Awbotaar, a prequel crossover of Baishe Srabon and Vinci Da was released, thus making Dwitiyo Purush the third installment of Srijit Mukherji's Cop Universe.

== Plot ==
In 1993, during a gang war, in which police and politics got involved, three heinous killings were committed by Khoka, a 15/16-years-old drug-addicted gang leader in Chinatown. These victims were: Rumi, a member of a rival gang (struck by Khoka's knife through the lower abdomen; Khoka's gang member Kalu was subsequently ordered to use it to carve his name on the man's forehead); an unknown police informer (throat was silted right through with a razor at tannery by Kalu; same weapon used to carve Khoka's name on the man's forehead); a police officer (hacked to death with a cleaver; same weapon used by Kalu to carve Khoka's name on the man's forehead). Khoka was captured by Inspector Pranab Roy Chowdhury, elder brother of Probir Roy Chowdhury. The story goes forward in 2019 where Abhijit Pakrashi, who is being regularly haunted by Probir's suicide, is given a case by Commissioner Dibakar Bose and Debu to capture Khoka who had been out of prison one month ago and committed a murder of a gang rival leader Haroo in the exactly same pattern and in the same place as he did in 1993. Abhijit is himself having a torrid time with Amrita, now his wife, and he suspects that she is having an affair with Shurjo Sinha. Nonetheless, Abhijit starts the investigation with a young fellow officer Rajat Chakrabarty, thereby bringing Abhijit to the brink of divorcing Amrita.

According to Abhijit, the fact that Khoka was a serial killer was wrong: he would carve his name on the victim's forehead with a knife simply to scare the opponent gang or the police. The real question is the motive. What was Khoka's motive for killing those people? Moreover, what about the carving on the forehead? Since there is no proof that it had been done by Khoka (because it was a rough carving), it might be speculated that it was possibly an imitation. Tired and frustrated with his domestic conflicts, Abhijit starts to live with Rajat and the latter's girlfriend, Ankita. From old news video footage retrieved from the news channel TV Bangla (courtesy Shurjo), Abhijit finds a person named Gora (who now calls himself Jimmy and runs a restaurant at Chinatown) present in all previous murder spots. He confronts Jimmy; the latter denied of having connection or memory regarding Khoka. In the due course of time another murder takes place and that of an informer in the same way. Abhijit and Amrita are finally reconciled, feeling guilty for not giving time to each other, but their happiness was soon followed by a horrifying tragedy. Rajat is also trapped by Khoka (by apparently impersonating Abhijit's voice and calling Rajat to the third murder spot where the police officer died in 1993) and mercilessly killed by the latter in the same way. The sheer brutality of the murder drives Ankita insane. A disoriented Abhijit, after ranting out his failures to Amrita (as well as how he never captured Probir himself, contrary to what the media claims), swears to catch Khoka alone. He gets hold of Jimmy and forced him, after beating him black and blue, to call Khoka at the old, burnt down mill in Chinatown for the final showdown.

During the initial verbal confrontation, it is revealed that the Khoka Abhijit is facing is actually Paltan, the boyfriend of Khoka and was wrongfully taken into custody so that he can take up the identity of actual Khoka and the actual Khoka can live a fresh life. In a shocking twist, it is also revealed that Abhijit is none other than the real Khoka himself. Flashbacks reveal that when Khoka was taken into custody, he was so mercilessly beaten by Pranab that he lost his memory for amnesia; the old DIG of Police, repentant about the police brutality, suspended Pranab and gave Khoka a new family and new identify as Abhijit Pakrashi. Under that name, Khoka was adopted by the DIG's younger brother and sister-in-law. Paltan, who learnt all these things from the DIG's servant, went to see Khoka who was on a train, leaving for Asansol, and tried to remind him of past life but was shooed away by Khoka's 'mother' who, mistaking Paltan as a beggar, gave one rupee to the shocked Paltan before the train left. He was captured by Bibek, the DIG's correspondent and forced to live the life of Khoka. Paltan loved Khoka very much and hence he accepted to live the life of Khoka to complete the term in the correctional home and prison. After 25 years, Paltan was released and he tracks Khoka's whereabouts, and commits the three murders to help Khoka remember his past with the hope to reunite with him and also it was Paltan who got in touch with Gora so that Abhijit can reach Paltan. Initially a horrified Abhijit refused to believe the story and attacked Paltan with foul words, threatening him to kill him should he speak further, shocking the latter. But as the persistent Paltan pleads with Abhijit to be honest about whether he remembers anything or not, Abhijit eventually had an emotional breakdown and begins crying. Paltan realised that Khoka recognized Paltan and his love relationship; shading tears of joy, he shows Khoka the one-rupee coin he got earlier from Khoka's 'mother' and hugged Khoka, before prolonged-kissing him aggressively. But finally, in midst of the kiss, Abhijit killed Paltan by shooting him 3 times so that the last link that can reveal the original identity of Khoka can be eliminated.

The film then ends with a final twist: back in 1993, Khoka actually never lost his memory (which explains Abhijit's reluctance of accepting Khoka as the "serial killer") but suffered only a temporary amnesia. He never told the DIG or his adoptive parents that his memory had returned; otherwise, he would have been sent to jail and would be doomed forever. He took the opportunity and moved ahead in life, as an extremely honest police officer. Thus, it becomes clear that what Abhijit said about his backstory in Baishe Srabon was a totally fabricated one created by Abhijit to evoke sympathy and for cover. This final twist becomes evident in the last scene where parallelly Khoka (in 1993) from a hospital staff and Abhijit (in 2019) from a fast food stall ordered Khoka's favorite food chicken chowmin and chilli fish; Abhjit, who has picked up the one-rupee coin from dead Paltan, tosses it to the sky and then smirks, facing the audience, now that he is free from his dark past forever.

== Cast ==
- Parambrata Chatterjee as Abhijit Pakrashi
- Rwitobroto Mukherjee as Khoka (1993 timeline)
- Anirban Bhattacharya as Khoka (2019 timeline)
- Raima Sen as Amrita
- Gaurav Chakrabarty as Rajat Chakrabarty
- Subhra Sourav Das as Jimmy/Gora
- Kamaleswar Mukherjee as Commissioner Dibakar Bose (guest appearance)
- Anindya Banerjee as Debabrata "Debu" Bhowmick (guest appearance)
- Soham Maitra as Paltan (1993 timeline)
- Babul Supriyo as Pranab Roy Chowdhury (special appearance)
- Abir Chatterjee as Shurjo Sinha (cameo appearance)
- Ridhima Ghosh as Ankita (guest appearance)

== Release ==
The film was released on 23 January 2020.

== Soundtrack ==
Track listing
No.	Title	Lyrics	Music	Singer(s)	Length
1.	"Je Kawta Din Reprise"	Anupam Roy	Anupam Roy	Anupam Roy, Iman Chakraborty	4:05
2.	"Abar Phire Ele"	Anupam Roy	Anupam Roy	Arijit Singh	3:35
3.	"Aami Aachhi"	Anupam Roy	Anupam Roy	Rupam Islam	2:58
