= Srijit Mukherji's Cop Universe =

Indian neo-noir media franchise

- Created by: Srijit Mukherji
- Original work: Baishe Srabon (2011)
- Owner: Shree Venkatesh Films
- Years: 2011–present

Films and television
- Film(s): Baishe Srabon (2011); Vinci Da (2019); Dwitiyo Purush (2020); Dawshom Awbotaar (2023); Untitled sequel to Dawshom Awbotaar (TBA)

Audio
- Soundtrack(s): Baishe Srabon; Vinci Da; Dwitiyo Purush; Dawshom Awbotaar

Srijit Mukherji's Cop Universe is an Indian media franchise and shared universe created by Srijit Mukherji, consisting of media focusing on police officers who predominantly solve cases of serial killers. The universe was established by crossing over common plot elements, settings, cast, and characters.

The first film, Baishe Srabon (2011) focuses on Prabir Roy Chowdhury, an ex-DCP who is returned in his duty when incidents of serial killing begin in Kolkata. He is assisted by ACP Abhijit Pakrashi. The second film, Vinci Da (2019) focuses on DCDD Bijoy Poddar, who arrests corrupt people who were being accused falsely by Adi Bose, a 'serial lawyer', with the help of Vinci Da, a makeup artist. The third film, Dwitiyo Purush (2020), a spinoff sequel to Baishe Srabon, focuses on the life of (now DCDD) Abhijit Pakrashi, eight years after the events of the prequel, when he tries to solve a new case of serial killing that involves a former gangster Khoka. Pakrashi is assisted by a young police officer Rajat Chakraborty. The fourth film, Dawshom Awbotaar (2023), a prequel to all the previous films, brings together Prabir Roy Chowdhury and Bijoy Poddar in solving a case of serial killing that involves a connection to the ten avatars of Lord Vishnu.

== Films ==
Film	Release date	Director(s)	Writer(s)	Producer(s)	Status
Baishe Srabon	30 September 2011	Srijit Mukherji	Srijit Mukherji	Shree Venkatesh Films	Released
Vinci Da	12 April 2019	Srijit Mukherji	Srijit Mukherji and Rudranil Ghosh	Shree Venkatesh Films	Released
Dwitiyo Purush	23 January 2020	Srijit Mukherji	Srijit Mukherji and Suvonkar Banerjee	Shree Venkatesh Films	Released
Dawshom Awbotaar	19 October 2023	Srijit Mukherji	Srijit Mukherji	Shree Venkatesh Films Jio Studios	Released

=== Baishe Srabon (2011) ===
Several murders have taken place throughout Kolkata, for which a serial killer is believed to be responsible. The killer strikes in accordance with verses of Bengali poetry, which he leaves next to his victims. The police are baffled; ACP Abhijit Pakrashi struggles to solve the case, which takes a toll on his relationship with his girlfriend, Amrita Mukherjee, a TV journalist. Abhijit's superior officer, Commissioner Amit Kumar Srivastav, brings back ex-DCP Prabir Roy Chowdhury, to help solve the case. Prabir, who was suspended for his violent methods, is notoriously ill-tempered and foul-mouthed. Prabir and Abhijit work together, while Amrita and her colleague Surjo Sinha, research serial killers for a TV series, whose thirteenth-and-final episode will be about a contemporary killer. Meanwhile, eccentric poet, Nibaron Chakraborty, who considers himself to be a part of the Hungry Generation, wanders Kolkata at night reciting poems.

The first installment of the universe, it stars Prosenjit Chatterjee in the lead role, along with Parambrata Chatterjee, Raima Sen, Abir Chatterjee, Goutam Ghose, Sumit Samaddar and Rajesh Sharma in pivotal roles.

=== Vinci Da (2019) ===
At the time when Vinci Da, an extremely talented make-up artist, struggling in his professional life, faces disasters because of his straight forwardness and arrogance; enters Adi Bose, a serial killer, changing Vinci Da's life forever. Bose takes up the prosthetic makeup of corrupt people and involve them publicly in criminal cases. DCDD Bijoy Poddar subsequently arrests them, without knowing Bose's involvement in this.

The second installment in the universe stars Rudranil Ghosh, Ritwick Chakraborty and Anirban Bhattacharya with Sohini Sarkar in supporting roles.

=== Dwitiyo Purush (2020) ===
In 2019, DCDD Abhijit Pakrashi, who is regularly haunted and traumatized by Prabir Roy Chowdhury's suicide, is assigned a case by Commissioner Dibakar Bose, to capture Khoka, a former gangster who was released from prison a month ago and already committed the murder of his rival gang leader, Haroo, in exactly the same fashion and place from 1993. Abhijit is having a torrid time with his wife, Amrita, as he suspects her of having an affair with her journalist colleague, Surjo Sinha, and decides to start his investigation with a younger fellow officer, Rajat Chakraborty, much to the despair of Amrita, who was looking forward to mending their relationship.

The third installment in the universe stars Parambrata Chatterjee reprising the role of Abhijit Pakrashi the title role, alongside Raima Sen, Anirban Bhattacharya, Gaurav Chakrabarty and Abir Chatterjee, along with archived footages of Prosenjit Chatterjee as Prabir Roy Chowdhury from Baishe Srabon.

=== Dawshom Awbotaar (2023) ===
In the timeline before the events of Baishe Srabon, Prabir Roy Chowdhury and Bijoy Poddar investigate a case of serial killing where the killer kills corrupt people in the pattern of the ten avatars of Lord Vishnu. They are assisted by Moitreyee Ghatak, a psychiatrist, whose patient was the killer.

The fourth installment in the universe stars Prosenjit Chatterjee, Anirban Bhattacharya, Jaya Ahsan and Jisshu Sengupta, along with Rajesh Sharma and Sumit Samaddar in cameo appearances.

=== Future ===
Before the release of Dawshom Awbotaar, Mukherji expressed his wish to make two more films with Prabir-Poddar duo. At the end of the film, a clear hint was given that Prabir-Poddar duo has again been brought on board to investigate a new case of serial killing in Kolkata.

== Crew ==
Occupation	Film			
Occupation	Baishe Srabon (2011)	Vinci Da (2019)	Dwitiyo Purush (2020)	Dawshom Awbotaar (2023)
Director	Srijit Mukherji	Srijit Mukherji	Srijit Mukherji	Srijit Mukherji
Producer(s)	Shree Venkatesh Films	Shree Venkatesh Films	Shree Venkatesh Films	Shree Venkatesh Films and Jio Studios
Writer(s)	Srijit Mukherji	Srijit Mukherji; Rudranil Ghosh	Srijit Mukherji; Suvonkar Banerjee	Srijit Mukherji
Music composer(s)	Anupam Roy	Anupam Roy	Anupam Roy	Anupam Roy
Lyricists	Anupam Roy	Anupam Roy	Anupam Roy	Anupam Roy
Background Score	Indraadip Dasgupta	Indraadip Dasgupta	Indraadip Dasgupta	Indraadip Dasgupta
Cinematography	Soumik Haldar	Sudipta Majumdar	Soumik Haldar	Soumik Haldar
Editor	Bodhaditya Banerjee	Pronoy Dasgupta	Pronoy Dasgupta	Pronoy Dasgupta

== Recurring cast and characters ==
List indicators

This section includes characters who will appear or have appeared in Srijit Mukherji's Cop Universe.

- An empty grey cell indicates the character was not in the film, or that the character's official presence has not yet been confirmed.
- ^{A} indicates an appearance through archival footage or audio.
- ^{C} indicates a cameo role.
- ^{Y} indicates a younger version of the character.

Characters	Films			
Characters	Baishe Srabon (2011)	Vinci Da (2019)	Dwitiyo Purush (2020)	Dawshom Awbotaar (2023)
Introduced in Baishe Srabon (2011)
Prabir Roy Chowdhury	Prosenjit Chatterjee		Prosenjit Chatterjee^{A}	Prosenjit Chatterjee
Abhijit Pakrashi	Parambrata Chatterjee		Parambrata Chatterjee	
Abhijit Pakrashi			Rwitobroto Mukherjee^{Y}	
Amrita Mukherjee	Raima Sen		Raima Sen^{C}	
Surjo Sinha	Abir Chatterjee		Abir Chatterjee^{C}	
Nibaron Chakraborty	Goutam Ghose			Mentioned (Note: Moitreyee, after narrating a Bengali translation of the poem Go to the Limits of Your Longing by Rainer Maria Rilke, says that many Bengali writers have translated Rilke's poems and adds that the version she quoted was by Nibaron Chakraborty.)
Prabir's wife	June Malia^{C}			June Malia^{C}
Kanai	Sumit Samaddar			Sumit Samaddar^{C}
Amit Kumar Srivastav	Rajesh Sharma			Rajesh Sharma^{C}
Debabrata Bhowmick	Anindya Banerjee^{C}		Anindya Banerjee^{C}	
	Introduced in Vinci Da (2019)			
Bijoy Poddar		Anirban Bhattacharya		Anirban Bhattacharya
Adi Bose		Ritwick Chakraborty		
Adi Bose		Riddhi Sen^{Y}^{C}		
Vinci Da		Rudranil Ghosh		
Jaya		Sohini Sarkar		
Introduced in Dwitiyo Purush (2020)
Rajat Chakrabarty			Gaurav Chakrabarty	
Khoka/Paltan			Anirban Bhattacharya	Indirectly Mentioned (Note: Bijoy mentions that his father was a sex-addict and visited several prostitution houses, leading to a possibility of Bijoy having a number of brothers and sisters, to whom he humorously refers as "Khoka"(s) or "Khuki"(s).)
Khoka/Paltan			Soham Maitra^{Y}	
Pranab Roy Chowdhury			Babul Supriyo^{C}	
Introduced in Dawshom Awbotaar (2023)
Moitreyee Ghatak				Jaya Ahsan
Bishwaroop Bardhan				Jisshu Sengupta
Bishwaroop Bardhan				Ankit Mazumder^{Y}^{C}
Bishwaroop Bardhan				Shankhadeep Banerjee^{Y}^{C}

Additionally, Mukherji, the director, appears in special appearances in all the four movies in different characters- a man with a laptop Baishe Srabon, a Principal in a school in Vinci Da, a wedding guest in Dwitiyo Purush and an aquarium seller in Dawshom Awbotaar.

== Timeline ==
Srijit Mukherji's Cop Universe timeline (as of Dawshom Awbotaar)
1993	Dwitiyo Purush flashback
1994–2002
2003	Dawshom Awbotaar
2004–2010
2011	Baishe Srabon
2012–2018
2019	Dwitiyo Purush
2019	Vinci Da

An official timeline hasn't been released but the movies give an indication.
