= Ek Je Chhilo Raja =

2018 Indian Bengali film by Srijit Mukherji

- Film poster
- Directed by: Srijit Mukherji
- Written by: Srijit Mukherji
- Screenplay by: Srijit Mukherji
- Based on: Life Tragedy of Bhawal Raja
- Starring: Jisshu Sengupta
- Cinematography: Gairik Sarkar
- Edited by: Pronoy Dasgupta
- Music by: Indraadip Dasgupta
- Production company: SVF studios
- Distributed by: SVF Entertainment
- Release date: 12 October 2018
- Running time: 147 minutes
- Country: India
- Language: Bengali

Ek Je Chhilo Raja is an Indian Bengali drama film directed by Srijit Mukherji, under the banner of SVF Entertainment Pvt Ltd, starring Jisshu Sengupta in the title role of Maharaja Mahendra Kumar Chowdhury as well as the Bhawal sanyasi. The film also stars Jaya Ahsan, Aparna Sen, Anirban Bhattacharya, Anjan Dutt, Rudranil Ghosh and Sreenanda Shankar. The movie was released during Durga puja 2018. Most of the film was shot at Kathgola in Murshidabad. The film won the National Film Award for Best Feature Film in Bengali at India's 66th National Film Awards.

== Plot ==
The movie is based on the Bhawal case, an extended Indian court case about a possible impostor who claimed to be the prince of Bhawal, who was presumed dead a decade earlier.

== Cast ==
- Jisshu Sengupta as Raja Mahendra Kumar Chowdhury/Naga sannyasi
- Jaya Ahsan as Mrinmayee Debi
- Anirban Bhattacharya as Satya Banerjee
- Anjan Dutta as Lawyer Bhaskar Mukherjee
- Aparna Sen as Lawyer Anupama Basu
- Rudranil Ghosh as Doctor Ashwini Dasgupta
- Rajnandini Paul as Chandravati Devi
- Barun Chanda as The Judge
- Alexx O'Nell as Rankin
- Sreenanda Shankar as Kadambari (Baiji)

== Soundtrack ==
All lyrics are written by Srijato; all music is composed by Indraadip Dasgupta.

No.	Title	Lyrics	Music	Singer(s)	Length
1.	"Esho Hey"	Srijato	Indraadip Dasgupta	Shreya Ghoshal & Ishan Mitra	3:37
2.	"Tu Dikkhe Na"	Srijato	Indraadip Dasgupta	Kailash Kher & Ishan Mitra	5:56
3.	"Maharajo"	Rabindranath Tagore	Rabindranath Tagore, Indraadip Dasgupta	Sahana Bajpaie	4:16
4.	"Ke Ami Kothay"	Srijato	Indraadip Dasgupta	Arijit Singh	3:03
5.	"Ruthey Naina"	Srijato	Indraadip Dasgupta	Kaushiki Chakraborty	2:42

== Release and reception ==
Ek Je Chhilo Raja released on 12 October 2018. Bengali newspaper Anandabazar Patrika wrote in their review that Jisshu Sengupta performance was one of the best portrayals in his career. They also praised the performance by Jaya Ahsan.

== Awards ==
=== 66th National Film Awards ===
- Best Feature Film in Bengali - Ek Je Chhilo Raja
