= Baishe Srabon =

2011 film by Srijit Mukherji

Baishey Srabon
- Theatrical release poster
- Directed by: Srijit Mukherji
- Screenplay by: Srijit Mukherji
- Story by: Srijit Mukherji
- Produced by: Shrikant Mohta; Mahendra Soni
- Starring: Prosenjit Chatterjee; Parambrata Chatterjee; Raima Sen; Abir Chatterjee; Gautam Ghose
- Cinematography: Soumik Halder
- Edited by: Bodhaditya Banerjee
- Music by: Songs: Anupam Roy; Background score: Indraadip Dasgupta
- Production company: Shree Venkatesh Films
- Distributed by: Shree Venkatesh Films
- Release date: 30 September 2011
- Running time: 140 minutes
- Country: India
- Language: Bengali

Baishe Srabon (/baɪʃeɪ ʃraːbon/ transl. The 22nd Srabon), also marketed as 22 Shey Srabon, is a 2011 Indian Bengali-language neo-noir psychological thriller film written and directed by Srijit Mukherji. Produced by Shrikant Mohta and Mahendra Soni under the banner of Shree Venkatesh Films, the film is the first instalment of Mukherji's own Cop Universe. It stars an ensemble cast of Prosenjit Chatterjee, Parambrata Chatterjee, Raima Sen, Abir Chatterjee and Gautam Ghose in the leads. The film features a suspended brutal-minded and hot-tempered police officer, being recruited by the department to solve a case involving a serial killer, who murders his victims according to the different verses of Bengali poems.

Initially planned as a telefilm with a different cast, the film marks Mukherji's second collaboration with Prosenjit Chatterjee, and Ghose's comeback to acting after a 29-year absence. Partially modeled on the characters of the American crime thriller Seven (1995), the film brought the thriller genre back to Bengali cinema after a long time. The film was announced in December 2010, and principal photography commenced in January 2011. Filming took places in Kolkata and Howrah, with portions being shot in Shimla and Nainital. Anupam Roy composed its soundtrack, while score was provided by Indraadip Dasgupta. It is the first film to have the Hungry movement in the 1960s in its storyline.

Upon release, it received highly positive reviews from critics and was one of the highest-grossing Bengali films of 2011. It is now considered as a cult film among the Bengali audience.

The sequel named Dwitiyo Purush, was released on 23 January 2020 and the prequel named Dawshom Awbotaar, was released on 19 October 2023. Both were directed by Srijit Mukherji.

== Plot ==
Four consecutive murders have taken place throughout Kolkata respectively on 11 September 2010, 22 October 2010, 11 December 2010, and 23 March 2011, for which a serial killer is believed responsible. The murderer strikes in accordance with verses of Bengali poetry, and he leaves behind, next to each victim, a chit featuring extract of a Bengali poem. Victims include respectively a madman (head smashed in by a stone; chit featured the poem Biggan Shikkha by Sukumar Ray), a prostitute named Malati "Rosie" Kundu (bludgeoned and then garroted; chit featured the poem Banalata Sen by Jibanananda Das), a gravedigger named Shubaran Dhol (run over by car multiple times; chit featured the poem Phire Esho, Chaka by Binoy Majumdar), and lastly, a goon named Babloo Samaddar (stabbed on the back; chit featured the poem Cheleta by Shakti Chattopadhyay). The police are baffled; the chief detective of this case, Abhijit Pakrashi, struggles to solve the case, owing to which he had a break-up with his girlfriend Amrita Mukherji, a television journalist. Abhijit's senior, Joint Commissioner of Detective Department Amit Kumar Srivastava, on the advice of Abhijit's frenemy Debabrata "Debu" Bhowmick, instructs Abhijit to take an 'expert opinion' from Amit's brilliant classmate: Probir Roy Chowdhury. However, there's a catch: despite being one of the finest officers in police officer, Probir had severe anger management issues. He would take any criminal, proved guilty or not, as his personal enemy and would go to any extent to exact revenge on him; and if he realised that any criminal is beyond the hands of law that he would kill him either in encounter or in custody. As such, he shot dead Monty Haldar, the son of an influential promoter in 1999. This led to a dramatic trial where he was dishonourably suspended. When Abhijit hesitated to meet Probir, Amit informed him that the infamous serial killing cases of 1977 Pune, 1985 Mumbai, 1988 Chennai, and 1989 Kolkata, featured Probir as a common member in each of the four distinct investigating teams; however, he alerted Abhijit that he is a rough and foul-mouthed person before advising him again to meet Probir. Amrita and her colleague Shurjo Sinha research serial killers for a series whose thirteenth-and-final episode will be about a contemporary murderer. Abhijit visits Probir whom he tried to convince in vain. Probir mocks the entire department and provokes Abhijit's ego; however, he claims he will decide otherwise only if Amit personally comes to request to him. Meanwhile, an eccentric poet, Nibaron Chakraborty, who considers himself part of the Hungry Generation, wanders Kolkata at night reciting poems.

On 13 May 2011, another murder takes place. The victim is a beggar women killed in the manner of the Stoneman victims and the chit beside her featured the poem He Mahajiban by Sukanta Battacharya. This incident proved to be a last straw for Amit. After Amit personally arrives and requests Probir to rejoin, only then was the latter convinced. However, Probir has four conditions: he would report nothing to anyone except to himself (Probir); his decision would be final; he would need a police jeep; and he would need a different room. Researching serial killers, Amrita visits a prison where the warden remembers Rafique Ahmed and his only confidant in 18 years of imprisonment: Nibaron Chakraborty. She and Shurjo go to Nibaron's house to question him, after being greeted by his servant, Swapan; they are convinced he is insane when Nibaron says he has a meeting with "Rabindranath". They almost succeed in learning about Rafique when Shurjo angers him by mentioning the 1997 book-fair arson for which he was imprisoned. At the same time, Probir appointed an ex-pickpocket Ratan as his informer. On their way back, Abhijit sees Amrita and Shurjo together from Probir's jeep. He forcefully storms out of the jeep to which an infuriated Probir suspends him. Shurjo takes Amrita to a cemetery, telling her he would propose in a few days. They end up in Debu's police station after Debu's junior confronts the two and is slapped by Amrita. That same evening, Abhijit, having consumed drugs, goes to Probir's house and pours out his heart while having whisky; he tells Probir how he lost his abusive father, who was often under the influence of alcohol, when he was merely 14 and how it left Abhijit, who later migrated to Kolkata for a new life, totally alone.

Probir rebukes the weeping Abhijit and tells him that once, he reported back to duty the day after cremating his wife and child, encouraging him to always feel to be the luckiest person on the world because there's always someone who has worse fate than him. As the discussions continue, Probir soon traces the dots and, realised that Abhijit had a break-up with his girlfriend; softening, he advises to reconcile with her (and, as it is implied, scraps the suspension order). Abhijit, still tipsy, rescues Amrita and Shurjo when Debu recognises Amrita as Abhijit's girlfriend and the two lovers reconcile while Shurjo gracefully shelves his proposal plans. The next day, while randomly discussing poets and poems, Probir and Abhijit deduce that the killer strikes on the death anniversaries of well-known Bengali poets. When they search all possible days the killer could strike, they discover that the next date is 29 June: Michael Madhusudan Dutt's death anniversary. Amrita tells Abhijit what she and Shurjo have been doing, including the interview with Nibaron.

This convinces him that Nibaron is the killer, especially when Swapan visits Probir and informs them about his employer's nightly walks around the city. The duo visit Nibaron as journalists, and try to understand his stance on the Hungry Generation. It becomes clear that Nibaron doesn't consider the movement to be a failure, and has no regret about his attempted arson at the book fair years ago. Abhijit and Probir watch Nibaron's house on the fateful night. A hooded figure comes out; it is Swapan, fleeing. He reveals that Nibaron has been very depressed, and has been burning all his poetry. In the house, they find Nibaron has committed suicide and, discovering another chit beside his body (featuring the poem Darao Pothik-bor by Madhusadan), realize this was the final murder. The case is closed, and Probir is congratulated by the police department for solving the case. Slowly, Abhijit began allying with Shurjo, while maintaining caution.

After a month or so, Rabindranath Tagore's death anniversary (Baishe Srabon) arrives. Probir invites Abhijit to his mansion where he sees a man named Rabindranath Moitra, a publisher, accepting a cheque from Probir. When Probir tells Abhijit to have whisky and gives out the order to his servant, Abhijit is shocked to see that "Swapan" is Probir's servant and his real name is Kanai. Probir asked Abhijit whether he had any suspicions about the case to which Abhijit, who felt the chain of events too predictable, revealed that Probir had some poetry books in his library (with certain pages marked) whose date of issue was May 2010, months before the first murder. Probir praises Abhijit and then both of them began to have whisky during which Probir reveals his own backstory: he addresses himself as a strict and ruthless man whose only obsessions were duty, police force and to eliminate criminals. He demanded fear from others to the point of committing the worst on them in case of otherwise. As such, once in his early days (when he served as Amit's proxy for a time), he had, in an interrogation room, brutally beaten a criminal to the point of breaking his limb; owing to this, the criminal's fellow gang members mercilessly eliminated Probir's wife and their son, something which had a major toll on Probir. But yet, Probir had no choice but to report back to duty after the funeral for the sake of protecting the city. At this juncture, Abhijit suddenly became unconscious; soon he wakes up, only to find himself bound to chair by Probir who had drugged his whisky. Probir admits, much to Abhijit's horror, that he was the mastermind behind the murders, with Kanai (a murderous butcher-turned-convict) carrying them out. He wanted to extract revenge on the police force for his suspension, which he considered an insult to his hard work despite the loss of his family. Since he was an expert in solving serial killings, he decided to set up one to force the department to "beg" to him to rejoin and solve the case. It was easy to frame Nibaron as the fake serial killer, since the 1997 book-fair arson was handled by Probir years ago. Probir had set up Rabindranath with the plan of Rabindranath meeting Nibaron regularly regarding publishing Nibaron's poems, which led to Nibaron going out late in the night; but suddenly, Rabindranath refused to publish the poems, which gave Nibaron a motive in the public eye to commit suicide. Nibaron was, in reality, served poisoned tea by Kanai, which was the reason why Probir immediately closed the case. Probir makes it clear that Nibaron's death wasn't the final murder and walks up to Abhijit with his revolver. Abhijit believes himself to be the next victim; however, Probir has begun to his late son in Abhijit and wants to entrust him with the hopes he had with his son: purge the society from its impurities and be a strict officer. After requesting Abhijit to arrest Kanai and close the case in a new way, he makes it very clear that he considers himself a murderer, and intends to kill himself since he "hates murderers". Despite Abhijit tearfully pleading with him not to, Probir shoots himself dead after reciting the last poem: Shesher Kabita.

== Cast ==
- Prosenjit Chatterjee as Probir Roy Chowdhury
- Parambrata Chatterjee as Abhijit Pakrashi
- Goutam Ghose as Nibaron Chakraborty (Name adapted from the protagonist's alias in Rabindranath Tagore's Shesher Kabita)
- Raima Sen as Amrita Mukherji
- Abir Chatterjee as Shurjo Sinha
- Rajesh Sharma as Joint Commissioner of Detective Department Amit Kumar Srivastav
- June Malia as Probir's wife (guest appearance)
- Biswajit Chakraborty as the public prosecutor of the Monty Haldar case (guest appearance)
- Anindya Banerjee as Debabrata "Debu" Bhowmick
- Sumit Samaddar as Swapan/Kanai
- Arindol Bagchi as Debu's constable at the graveyard
- Joyraj Bhattacharya as Rabindranath Moitra
- Kalyan Chatterjee as a drunkard at the station (guest appearance)
- Biplab Dasgupta as a jailer

== Soundtrack ==
Baishey Srabon

Soundtrack album by Anupam Roy
- Released: 27 August 2011
- Recorded: 2011
- Genre: Feature film soundtrack
- Length: 32:29
- Language: Bengali
- Label: SVF

The Baishe Srabon soundtrack is composed and the lyrics penned by Anupam Roy. The background music composed by Indraadip Dasgupta. Soundtrack got released on 27 August 2011.

The line "Ashole Shotyi Bole Shotyi Kichhu Nei" from the song "Ei Srabon" later inspired the title of Mukherji's 2025 directorial Shotyi Bole Shotyi Kichhu Nei.

Track listing
| No. | Title | Singer(s) | Length |
|---|---|---|---|
| 1. | "Ekbar Bol" | Anupam Roy | 4:59 |
| 2. | "Je Kota Din" (duet) | Saptarshi Mukherjee And Shreya Ghoshal | 4:05 |
| 3. | "Gobhire Jao (Male)" | Rupankar Bagchi | 4:55 |
| 4. | "Mati Khunre" | Raghab Chatterjee | 5:48 |
| 5. | "Ei Srabon" | Rupam Islam | 3:42 |
| 6. | "Je Kota Din (Male)" | Anindya Chatterjee | 4:04 |
| 7. | "Gobhire Jaao (Female)" | Shreya Ghoshal | 4:54 |
| Total length: | | | 32:29 |

== Literary references ==
Baishe Srabon plot uses poetry and dates of real life poets and poems that thicken the plot each time. And every murder had reference of poet and the murder was the metaphorical description of poem. Baishe Srabon is the first mainstream film incorporating the Bengali "hungry generation" movement of the 1960s into its plot. In the end Prabir recites Shesher Kobita by Kabiguru Rabindranath Tagore. The novel was published in 1929 and is considered a landmark. Tagore died on 22 Srabon (title of the film).

== Reception ==
Anandabazar Patrika gave Baishe Srabon 8.5 of 10 stars. It was the official selection at the 2011 Dubai International Film Festival, the closing film at the 2012 London Indian Film Festival and an official selection at the Darpan Film Festival in Singapore and the Alliance Francaise Film Festival in Kolkata.

The film ran for 105 days, making it one of the most successful of the year. Baishe Srabon received 41 awards. At the Mirchi Music Awards, it won for Best Upcoming Lyricist (Anupam Roy for "Ekbar Bol"), Best Lyricist (Anupam Roy for "Ekbar Bol"), Best Background Score, Best Film Album (Popular Choice), Best Film Album (Critic's Choice), Best Song (Popular Choice) for "Ekbar Bol" and Best Song (Critic's Choice) for "Gobhire Jao".

At the Kalakaar Awards, it was the best film; at the ABP-Friend's FM Bangla Music Awards it won for Best Music Director, Best Male Playback Singer (Rupankar for "Gobhire Jao"), Best Song ("Je Kota Din") and Best Film Album. Baishe Srabon won the inaugural Best Movie Poster Award at Srijon Samman 2012; at the 12th Telecine Awards it won the Best Director, Best Supporting Actor (Parambrata Chatterjee) and Best Male Playback (Anupam Roy for "Ekbar Bol") awards.

At the Zee Banglar Gourab Awards 2012, the film received nine awards from thirteen nominations: Best Film, Best Director, Best Actor Critic's Choice (Prosenjit Chatterjee), Best Supporting Actor (Parambrata Chatterjee), Best Music Director, Best Screenplay and Dialogues, Best Male Playback (Rupankar for "Gobhire Jao"), Best Cinematography and Best Editing. At the 2012 Star Guide Bengali Film Awards the film won the Best Director, Best Cinematography and Best Male Playback (Anupam Roy for "Ekbar Bol") awards.

At the International Bangla Film Academy Awards at Pattaya, Bangkok, Baishe Srabon won the Best Director, Best Screenplay, Best Actor in a Supporting Role (Gautam Ghosh), Best Male Playback Singer (Anupam Roy), Best Cinematography and Best Critic's Choice Performance (Parambrata Chatterjee) awards. Raima Sen received her first award for her performance in the film with the Shoilojanando Mukhopadhyay Memorial Award. The film won six awards at the International Bangla Film Critic Award (IBFCA). The film was also the official selection at the Dubai International Film Festival, London Indian Film Festival and Mumbai International Film Festival (MAMI).

== Sequel and Prequel ==
A sequel of the film was released on 23 January 2020, titled Dwitiyo Purush directed by Srijit Mukherji with Parambrata Chattopadhyay, Abir Chatterjee and Raima Sen reprising their roles.

In March 2023, Mukherji announced a prequel crossover between Baishe Srabon and Vinci Da as part of his planned Cop Universe with Prosenjit and Anirban Bhattacharya respectively portraying Probir and his new sidekick, Inspector Poddar to be released on Puja 2023. Dawshom Awobtaar was released on 19 October 2023 in collaboration with Jio Studios and SVF.
