= Srijit Mukherji =

Indian actor, film director and screenwriter

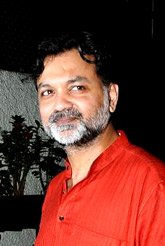
- Mukherji at screening of Begum Jaan
- Pronunciation: [ˈsɾid͡ʒit̪ ˈmukʰopad̪ʱːae̯]
- Born: 23 September 1977 (age 49); Bhawanipore, Kolkata, West Bengal, India
- Education: Presidency University, Kolkata; University of Calcutta; Jawaharlal Nehru University
- Occupations: Film director; screenwriter; actor; lyricist; music director
- Years active: 2010–present
- Notable work: Chotushkone, Baishe Srabon, Jaatiswar, Gumnaami, Hemlock Society
- Spouse: Rafiath Rashid Mithila (m. 2019)
- Relatives: Arati Mukhopadhyay (Aunt)
- Awards: 5 National Film Awards, 5 WBFJA Awards, State Awards (Govt. Of West Bengal)

Srijit Mukherji (Note: Bengali: [ˈsɾid͡ʒit̪ ˈmukʰopad̪ʱːae̯].) (Bengali: [ˈsɾid͡ʒit̪ ˈmukʰopad̪ʱːae̯]; born 23 September 1977) is an Indian film director and screenwriter, lyricist and composer, who predominantly works in Bengali cinema. His first directorial feature film Autograph (2010), was a critical and commercial success. In Emperor vs Sarat Chandra (2026), he made his debut as music composer.

== Early life ==
Mukherji was born and brought up in Bhawanipore in Kolkata. He completed his schooling till 10th standard from Dolna Day School, Kolkata and 12th from South Point School, Kolkata, before studying BA economics at Presidency College, Kolkata. He went on to complete his MA and MPhil in environmental economics at Jawaharlal Nehru University, parallelly working as a social scientist in the Urban Transport and Pollution Sector with TERI in New Delhi. He quit his Ph.D. while in his first year, to join IRI Symphony, Bangalore as an econometrician and business analyst. After working in Bangalore and a brief stint in Delhi, he quit his job to actively pursue theatre and films.

== Career ==
Even while working as an economist and statistician, he was actively involved with the English professional theatre circuit in Delhi and Bangalore. He has acted in Madness, adapted from Paulo Coelho's Veronica Decides To Die; Manoj Mitra's The Orchard of Banchharam; Badal Sircar's The Other Side of History; Sunil Ganguly's Pratidwandi – The Adversary, adapted for the stage from Satyajit Ray's film of the same name and Lucknow 76. He wrote and directed Mindgame, an Indian adaptation of Reginald Rose's Twelve Angry Men, at the Alliance Francaise De Bangalore in 2006. In April 2008, he formed his own troupe, Pandora's Act, whose first production, Feluda Pherot! at Rangashankara in July 2008 was a runaway success and was the first ever non-canonical dramatisation of Satyajit Ray's sleuth Feluda. Barun Chanda, Ray's leading man in Seemabodhho, and Parambrata Chatterjee, the screen Topshe and film youth icon, starred in this production. In 2009, he wrote, directed and acted in the English play Checkmate, a non-canonical re-interpretation of Byomkesh Bakshi, Saradindu Bandopadhyay's sleuth. He was an assistant director, lyricist and actor in both Anjan Dutt's Madly Bangalee and Aparna Sen's Iti Mrinalini, in 2009. He has also written lyrics for films like Cross Connection, Le Chakka and Josh, TV serials like Coffee and More and Dadagiri and non-film albums of Usha Uthup.

=== 2010–2012 ===
In 2010 Mukherji directed his debut feature film, the award-winning blockbuster – Autograph (starring Prosenjit Chatterjee, Indraneil Sengupta and Nandana Sen) which was both critically acclaimed and commercially successful. The film won 41 awards and was an official selection at Abu Dhabi International Film Festival 2010, MIAAC Film Festival in New York 2010, Glasgow International Film Festival 2011 and London Indian Film Festival 2011.

In the same year he also made his acting debut on Bengali television in the Rituparno Ghosh scripted mega serial Gaaner Opare, produced by Ideas Entertainment.

His work in 2011 included a major role in Anindya Banerjee's Chaplin starring Rudranil Ghosh and his second film, Baishe Srabon starring Prosenjit Chatterjee, Parambrata Chatterjee, Raima Sen, Abir Chatterjee and Gautam Ghose, who returned to acting after a hiatus of 29 years. Baishe Srabon was recently the official selection at the Dubai International Film Festival and the closing film at the London Indian Film Festival, and had a 105-day run at the box office making it the biggest blockbuster of the year. Baishe Srabon has won 41 awards. His third feature film was Hemlock Society, a romantic satire set at the backdrop of a school which teaches aspirants how to successfully commit suicide. It featured Parambrata Chatterjee and Koel Mallick and won 21 awards.

=== 2013–2016 ===
Mukherji's fourth film, Mishawr Rawhoshyo, based on Kakababu with Prasenjit Chattopadhyay playing the lead character and Indraneil Sengupta playing the role of Hani Alkadi, has been declared as one of the biggest blockbusters ever and the highest earning urban mainstream film. He has acted in films like Dutta Vs Dutta, Bapi Bari Jaa and the national award-winning Shobdo. His fifth film Jaatishwar, featuring Prosenjit Chatterjee and Jisshu Sengupta, is generally considered to be the best in his career and most critically acclaimed. It is the musical bridge between two centuries of Bengali culture and a biopic cum a musical cum a reincarnation drama. At the 61st National Awards 2014, the highest film honour in India, it won 4 national awards for Music Direction, Playback Singing, Costume and Make up. This was the highest tally for a film in India this year, and the second highest ever for a Bengali film. It also swept the Mirchi Music Awards in 2015 winning 7 awards. The following year at the 62nd National Awards 2015, Chotushkone won him the Best Director and Best Original Screenplay awards, along with winning the Best Cinematography.

He also received the Young Achiever Award from Rotary International, the prestigious Shera Bangali Award from ABP Anando and the Shoilojanando Mukhopadhyay Memorial Award in 2012 for his contribution in the field of film direction. In 2013 he received the Uttam Kumar Memorial Award from the Government of West Bengal becoming the youngest director to achieve this. He has also received the oldest film award in India, the BFJA award, for remarkable contribution to Bengali Cinema in the last few years.

=== 2017–2020 ===
Mukherji has made his directorial debut in Bollywood with the film Begum Jaan which is a remake of his earlier Bengali film Rajkahini. Vidya Balan plays the lead role of a brothel's madam during the partition of India in 1947. He had two releases in 2018, Uma and Ek Je Chhilo Raja. Both featured Jisshu Sengupta and were box office superhits. The former went to 10 film festivals around the world and won 6 awards while the latter won 23 awards and went to 7 film festivals around the world including Palm Springs International Film Festival. In 2018, it was reported that Mukherji will be directing a Junglee Pictures produced yet to be titled web-series in Hindi, based on the novel of noted novelist and blogger Arnab Ray, The Mahabharata Murders. This will be his first foray into web-series direction. In 2019, he has three releases Shahjahan Regency, Vinci Da and Gumnaami, the last two being both critical and commercial successes along with being a festival favourite. Gumnaami won the Best Bengali Feature Film and Best Adapted Screenplay Awards at the 67th National Film Awards. The sequel of Baishe Srabon, named Dwitiyo Purush, released in January 2020, after which he had a long gap without releases due to the COVID-19 pandemic.

He has also completed another web-series, Feluda Pherot, which is based on two Feluda stories written by Satyajit Ray, Chhinomostar Obhishaap and Darjeeling Jomjomat.

=== 2021–2024 ===
In 2021 he had 4 releases, out of which 2 were Hindi films. He directed Kakababur Protyaborton, which was based on the third film of the Kakababu franchise, it had Prosenjit Chatterjee as Kakababu, Aryann Bhowmik, Anirban Chakrabarti in the lead roles. His next release was X=Prem. A black and white romance drama film with debutant actors, the film earned critical praise and received several awards and nominations at the 6th Filmfare Awards Bangla and 6th WBFJA Awards.

His next projects that year were two Bollywood films: Sherdil: The Pilibhit Saga and Shabaash Mithu. The latter was the biography of one of the most influential Indian female cricketer Mithali Raj.

In 2023, he released Dawshom Awbotaar, a neo-noir crime thriller as the 4th installment Srijit Mukherji's Cop Universe. It served as the prequel crossover of his previous films Baishe Srabon and Vinci Da. It became a huge box office success emerged as one of the highest grossing Bengali films of 2023. The film received multiple nomination and awards at the Filmfare Awards Bangla and WBFJA Awards.

His first release in 2024 was the fantasy romantic comedy film Oti Uttam. For the first time ever in Indian Cinema, veteran actor Uttam Kumar appeared in the movie through Visual effects by using his scenes from his 56 existing old movies. His next release this year was a biopic on the life of Mrinal Sen. Titled Padatik, it chronicles his active time and contributions to Bengali cinema. His next thriller film titled Tekka starring Dev and Rukmini Maitra released on the occasion Durga Puja 2024 and earned an 'organic blockbuster' tag. His next venture is Feludar Goyendagiri (Season 2) which released on the occasion of Christmas 2024, digitally.

=== 2025–present ===
Srijit's next film Shotyi Bole Shotyi Kichhu Nei released in January 2025. Then he had a Poila Baishakh release, with the sequel of Hemlock Society, Killbill Society, a romantic dark comedy film that released in April 2025. He also had a Durga Puja release that year, but in the digital space, with the second and final season of Feluda Pherot, based on Jawto Kando Kathmandute by Satyajit Ray (held on from its initial Christmas 2020 release). Recently, an epic drama film titled Lawho Gouranger Naam Re, based on the life and times of Shri Chaitanya Mahaprabhu was released on the occasion of Christmas 2025. Upcoming, he has a complete film in hand named Winkle Twinkle, based on a play by Bratya Basu, that is currently roaming in different festivals and is scheduled to release theatrically soon in 2026. Another film by him is also released, titled Emperor vs Sarat Chandra, In this movie he made his music directorial debut where he also co edited movie.

== Filmography ==
=== As director ===
Denotes films or web series that have not yet been released

Year	Film	Director	Writer	Language	Notes
2010	Autograph	Yes	Yes	Bengali	Tribute to Satyajit Ray's 1966 film Nayak
2011	Baishe Srabon	Yes	Yes	Bengali	Influenced by the American crime thriller Seven (1995); first instalment of his Cop Universe
2012	Hemlock Society	Yes	Yes	Bengali	First instalment of the Society franchise
2013	Mishawr Rawhoshyo	Yes	No	Bengali	Based on the 1984 Kakababu novel of same name; first instalment of the SVF Kakababu franchise
2014	Jaatishwar	Yes	Yes	Bengali	Quasi-biopic of Anthony Firingee (Hensman Anthony)
2014	Chotushkone	Yes	Yes	Bengali	Loosely inspired by Agatha Christie's And Then There Were None
2015	Nirbaak	Yes	Yes	Bengali	Tribute to Salvador Dali
2015	Rajkahini	Yes	Yes	Bengali	Ridhima Ghosh's character's backstory adapted from Saadat Hasan Manto's short story Khol Do
2016	Zulfiqar	Yes	No	Bengali	Based on William Shakespeare's Julius Caesar and Antony and Cleopatra; also a tribute to Mario Puzo
2017	Begum Jaan	Yes	Yes	Hindi	Hindi remake of Rajkahini
2017	Yeti Obhijaan	Yes	No	Bengali	Based on the 1980 Kakababu novel Paharchuraye Aatanka; second instalment of the SVF Kakababu franchise and a sequel to Mishawr Rawhoshyo
2018	Uma	Yes	Yes	Bengali	Inspired by the true story of Evan Leversage
2018	Ek Je Chhilo Raja	Yes	Yes	Bengali	Based on the Bhawal case; first instalment of his Disapperance trilogy
2019	Shahjahan Regency	Yes	No	Bengali	Modernized adaptation of Mani Shankar Mukherjee's 1962 novel Chowringhee
2019	Vinci Da	Yes	Yes	Bengali	Second instalment of his Cop Universe
2019	Gumnaami	Yes	No	Bengali	Based on the Mukherjee Commission hearings on Netaji's death; second instalment of his Disapperance trilogy
2020	Dwitiyo Purush	Yes	Yes	Bengali	Sequel to Baishe Srabon; third instalment of his Cop Universe
2022	Kakababur Protyaborton	Yes	No	Bengali	Based on the 1986 Kakababu novel Jongoler Modhye Ek Hotel; third instalment of the SVF Kakababu franchise and a sequel to Mishawr Rawhoshyo and Yeti Obhijaan
2022	X=Prem	Yes	Yes	Bengali	Tribute to the American film Eternal Sunshine of the Spotless Mind (2004)
2022	Sherdil: The Pilibhit Saga	Yes	Yes	Hindi	Inspired by real-life stories of the Pilibhit tiger reserve
2022	Shabaash Mithu	Yes	No	Hindi	Biopic of Mithali Raj
2023	Dawshom Awbotaar	Yes	Yes	Bengali	Prequel crossover of Baishe Srabon and Vinci Da; fourth instalment of his Cop Universe
2024	Oti Uttam	Yes	Yes	Bengali	Tribute to Uttam Kumar. Using Uttam Kumar's film clips as dialogues and for situations and scenes.
2024	Padatik	Yes	Yes	Bengali	Biopic of Mrinal Sen
2024	Tekka	Yes	Yes	Bengali	
2025	Shotyi Bole Shotyi Kichhu Nei	Yes	No	Bengali	An adaptation of the NSD play Ek Ruka Hua Faisla
2025	Killbill Society	Yes	Yes	Bengali	Sequel to Hemlock Society; second instalment of the Society franchise
2025	Lawho Gouranger Naam Rey	Yes	Yes	Bengali	Quasi-biopics of Shri Chaitanya Mahaprabhu and Binodini Dasi; third instalment of his Disapperance trilogy
2026	Winkle Twinkle	Yes	Partial	Bengali	Based on the 2002 play by Bratya Basu of same name
2026	Emperor vs Sarat Chandra	Yes	Partial	Bengali	A dual adaptation of both Sarat Chandra Chattopadhyay's 1926 novel Pather Dabi, and the legal trial behind the ban of the novel
2027	Queen Victoria O Goyenda Kanaichawron	Yes	No	Bengali	Based on Rajarshi Das Bhowmik's story Kalapaanir Disha
2027	Maharaja Tomare Selam	Yes	Yes	Bengali	Based on the making of Goopy Gyne Bagha Byne

=== Web series ===
Year	Film	Director	Writer	OTT	Notes
2020	Feluda Pherot (Chhinnamastar Abhishap)	Yes	No	Addatimes	Based on the 1978 Feluda novel Chhinnamastar Abhishap; also his first Feluda adaptation
2021	Ray (Season 1)	Yes	No	Netflix	Anthology series serving as modernized adaptations of the works of Satyajit Ray; his episodes: Forget Me Not (adapting Bipin Chowdhury'r Smritibhrom) and Bahrupiya (adapting Bahurupi)
2021	Rabindranath Ekhane Kokhono Khete Asenni	Yes	No	Hoichoi	Based on Mohammad Nazim Uddin's 2015 Bengali novel of same name
2022	Feludar Goyendagiri (Season 1)	Yes	No	Hoichoi	Based on the 1986 Feluda novel Darjeeling Jamjomat; also his third Feluda adaptation
2023	Jaanbaaz Hindustan Ke	Yes	No	ZEE5	
2023	Durgo Rawhoshyo	Yes	No	Hoichoi	Based on the 1952 Byomkesh Bakshi novel of same name; released as part of the Hoichoi Best of Bengal strand (instead of Byomkesh)
2024	Feludar Goyendagiri (Season 2)	Yes	No	Hoichoi	Based on the 1987 Feluda novel Bhuswargo Bhayankar; also his final Feluda adaptation
2024	Shekhar Home	Yes	Yes	JioHotstar	Inspired by the cases of Sherlock Holmes; his episodes: It's Elementary, Dasbabu Ki Dulhan, Phir Milenge and Bhaskarvilla
2025	Feluda Pherot (Jawto Kando Kathmandute)	Yes	No	Addatimes	Based on the 1980 Feluda novel Joto Kando Kathmandute; also his second Feluda adaptation (postponed from 2020)

=== As lyricist, composer and actor ===
Year	Film	Lyricist	Actor	Composer
2009	Cross Connection	Yes	No	No
2009	Madly Bangalee	Yes	Yes	No
2010	Le Chakka	Yes	No	
2010	Josh	Yes	No	
2010	Gaaner Oparey	No	Yes	
2011	Iti Mrinalini	Yes	Yes	
2011	Flop-e	No	Yes	
2011	Ghente Ghaw	Yes	No	
2011	Chaplin	No	Yes	
2012	Dutta Vs Dutta	No	Yes	
2012	Bapi Bari Jaa	No	Yes	
2012	Shabdo	No	Yes	
2013	Maach Mishti & More	Yes	No	
2018	Ahare Mon	Yes	No	
2018	Kabir	No	Yes	
2019	Shantilal O Projapoti Rohoshyo	No	Yes	
2023	Manobjomin	No	Yes	
2023	Dilkhush	No	Yes	
2025	Killbill Society	Yes	Yes	
2026	Abhiman	Yes	No	Yes
2026	Emperor vs Sarat Chandra	Partial	No	Yes

He has also been on screen as part of a special appearance in all the films directed by him.

== Awards ==
National Awards (Govt. of India)

National Film Awards won by Srijit Mukherji
Film	Year (Award Ceremony)	Award Category	Ref
Chotushkone	2015 (62nd)	National Film Award for Best Director	
Chotushkone	2015 (62nd)	National Film Award for Best Original Screenplay	
Ek Je Chhilo Raja	2019 (66th)	National Film Award for Best Feature Film in Bengali	
Gumnaami	2020 (67th)	National Film Award for Best Adapted Screenplay	
Gumnaami	2020 (67th)	National Film Award for Best Feature Film in Bengali	

- Best Director for Chotushkone at the 62nd National Awards (2014)
- Best Original Screenplay for Chotushkone at the 62nd National Awards (2014)
- Best Adapted Screenplay for Gumnaami at the 67th National Awards (2019)
- Best Director (Bengali) for Ek Je Chhilo Raja at the 66th National Awards (2018)
- Best Director (Bengali) for Gumnaami at the 67th National Awards (2019)

International Awards

- Best Director for Ek Je Chhilo Raja at 20th Rainbow Film Festival, London (2018)
- Best Story for Vinci Da at 21st Rainbow Film Festival, London (2019)
- Best Film for Ek Je Chhilo Raja at 17th Dhaka International Film Festival (2019)
- Best Screenplay for Padatik at the 24th New York Indian Film Festival (2024)
- Best Director for Baishe Srabon at International Bangla Film Academy Awards (2011)
- Best Screenplay for Baishe Srabon at International Bangla Film Academy Awards (2011)
- Best Director for Shotyi Bole Shotyi Kichhu Nei at the 26th Rainbow Film Festival, London (2025)

Filmfare Awards

- Best Story for Vinci Da (2019)
- Best Film for Vinci Da (2019)
- Best Screenplay for Dwitiyo Purush (2020)
- Best Screenplay for Padatik (2024)

WBFJA Awards (Oldest Film Awards in India)

- Best Director for Ek Je Chhilo Raja (2018)
- Best Lyricist for Ahare Mon (2018)
- Best Screenplay for Dwitiyo Purush (2020)
- Best Director for Padatik (2024)

State Awards (Govt. Of West Bengal)

- Best Film for Autograph at the 10th Telecine Awards (2010)
- Best Director for Autograph at the 10th Telecine Awards (2010)
- Best Director for Baishe Srabon at the 11th Telecine Awards (2011)
- Best Director for Chotushkone at the 14th Telecine Awards (2014)
- Best Film for Vinci Da at the 18th Telecine Awards (2019)
- Best Director (Critics) for Vinci Da at the 18th Telecine Awards (2019)
- Best Film for Gumnaami at the 19th Telecine Awards (2019)
- Best Director (Critics) for Gumnaami at the 19th Telecine Awards (2019)

== Personal life ==
Mukherji was in a relationship with actress Swastika Mukherjee; they broke up after filming Jaatishwar in 2014. Later he dated Jaya Ahsan around 2017 for a brief period. Media reports speculated a romantic affair between him and actress Jaya Ahsan during the filming of Bishorjan (2017). Mukherji did not address the rumours directly, but described their relationship being "much more than love".

On 6 December 2019, Mukherji married actress Rafiath Rashid Mithila.
