= Autograph (2010 film) =

2010 Indian Bengali film

- Theatrical release poster
- Directed by: Srijit Mukherji
- Written by: Srijit Mukherji
- Produced by: Shree Venkatesh Films; Jay Dev Banerjee
- Starring: Prosenjit Chatterjee; Nandana Sen; Indraneil Sengupta
- Cinematography: Soumik Halder
- Edited by: Bodhaditya Banerjee
- Music by: Debojyoti Mishra; Anupam Roy
- Production companies: Shree Venkatesh Films Pvt. Ltd. Indigo Creation Production
- Release date: 14 October 2010
- Running time: 120 minutes
- Country: India
- Language: Bengali

Autograph is a 2010 Indian Bengali musical drama film by debutant director Srijit Mukherji. The movie is a tribute to Satyajit Ray's 1966 film Nayak and yesteryear Bengali actor Uttam Kumar, who portrayed the title role in the film. This was the first collaboration between Srijit Mukherjee and Prosenjit Chatterjee. The movie is being remade in Malayalam.

== Plot ==
The film starts with a proposal of remaking Satyajit Ray's famous Nayak by a debutant director and storywriter Shuvobrata to famous Bengali actor Arun Chatterjee. Arun approves Shuvobrata's proposal and agrees to finance the project. Shuvobrata requests his live-in girlfriend Srinandita or Shrin to act opposite Arun. In the meantime, Arun and Shrin become close friends and Arun tells her about various incident from his past in an emotionally triggered condition. The exchange is videotaped accidentally and Shuvobrata on discovering it leaks it to the press, without Srinandita's consent, as a publicity stunt for the film. Srinandita leaves Shuvobrata on learning of this indiscretion. Arun, furious about the leak, bars the film from being released. Arun later learns that Shrin had no role in the leak and apologizes to her. The movie ends with Shrin leaving a note and a phone number for Arun at a roadside dhaba where they had met earlier.

== Cast ==
- Prosenjit Chatterjee as Arun Chatterjee
- Nandana Sen as Srinandita
- Indraneil Sengupta as Shuvobrata Mitra
- Rudraprasad Sengupta
- Biswajit Chakraborty as Manoj Sarkar
- Pijush Ganguly as Ashish Chakraborty
- Dwijen Bandopadhyay as Parthapratim Nag
- Sohini Paul as Ahona Dasgupta
- Dhruv Mookerji as Moloy Dasgupta
- Dilip Roy as Tarun Mukherjee
- Srijit Mukherji
- Sanghasri Sinha Mitra as Nandini
- Rii Sen as Rupali Gupto

== Soundtrack ==
The music of the film is composed by Debojyoti Mishra and Anupam Roy. The lyrics have been penned by Anupam Roy, Srijato and Srijit Mukherji. The song Aamake Aamar Moto Thakte Dao turned out to be a popular amongst the Bengali audience.

#	Title	Singer(s)	Lyrics(s)	Music(s)
1	"Beche Thakar Gaan – Version 1"	Rupam Islam	Lyrics and Composition = Anupam Roy	Music Arrangement = Debojyoti Mishra
2	"Chal Rastay – Female"	Shreya Ghoshal	Srijato	Debojyoti Mishra
3	"Bhaage Jaana Hai Kahan"	Shankar Mahadevan	Srijato	Debajyoti Mishra
4	"Phaande Poriya Bawga Knaade Re"	Anandee Basu		Debajyoti Mishra
5	"Beche Thakar Gaan – Version 2"	Saptarshi Mukherjee	Anupam Roy & Debojyoti Mishra	Anupam Roy
6	"Chal Rastay – Male"	Priyam Mukherjee	Srijato	Debojyoti Mishra
7	"Uthche Jege Sokalgulo"	Shreya Ghoshal	Srijit Mukherji	Debojyoti Mishra
8	" Aamake Aamar Moto Thakte Dao"	Anupam Roy	Anupam Roy	Anupam Roy

== Recognition ==
The film premiered internationally at the Abu Dhabi Film Festival on 17 October 2010. The movie was showcased in New York City at the MIAAC (Mahindra Indo-American Arts Council) film festival, 2010 where it won a nomination for Prosenjit Chatterjee for the Best Actor award. It was also an official selection at the Glasgow International Film Festival and London Indian Film Festival in 2011. It was also showcased at the Kala Ghoda Film Festival in Mumbai in 2012 and the Darpan Film Festival in Singapore.
