= Hemlock Society (film) =

- Poster
- Directed by: Srijit Mukherji
- Written by: Srijit Mukherji
- Screenplay by: Srijit Mukherji
- Produced by: Shrikant Mohta; Mahendra Soni
- Starring: Koel Mallick; Parambrata Chatterjee; Dipankar De; Roopa Ganguly; Saheb Chatterjee
- Cinematography: Soumik Halder
- Edited by: Bodhaditya Banerjee
- Music by: Songs: Anupam Roy; Background score: Indraadip Dasgupta
- Production company: Shree Venkatesh Films
- Distributed by: Shree Venkatesh Films
- Release date: 22 June 2012
- Running time: 141 minutes
- Country: India
- Language: Bengali

Hemlock Society: Amader Kono Shakha Nei (transl. Hemlock Society: We have no branches) is a 2012 Indian Bengali-language black comedy romantic thriller film written and directed by Srijit Mukherji. Produced by Shrikant Mohta and Mahendra Soni under the banner of Shree Venkatesh Films, the title of the film is inspired by the erstwhile Hemlock Society, based in Santa Monica, US. It stars Koel Mallick and Parambrata Chatterjee in lead roles, while Dipankar De, Roopa Ganguly and Saheb Chatterjee play other pivotal roles. The primary missions of this society included providing information to dying persons and supporting legislation permitting physician-assisted suicide.

The film was announced in November 2011, while the title was announced in December 2011. Principal photography commenced in January 2012 and wrapped in March 2012. The film was predominantly shot in Kolkata. Anupam Roy composed and penned its soundtrack, while Indraadip Dasgupta provided the score. The cinematography and editing of the film were handled by Soumik Halder and Bodhaditya Banerjee respectively.

Hemlock Society was released worldwide on 22 June 2012 opening to positive reviews from the critics. It emerged as a box office success. It was remade into Marathi in 2015 as Welcome Zindagi. The movie is followed by its sequel, Killbill Society (2025).

== Plot ==
The story follows Meghna, a protagonist grappling with the loss of her mother and the presence of her father's new partner. Her emotional instability is further exacerbated by the rejection of her fiancé. Seeking an escape from her internal turmoil, she requests lethal doses of medication from her father, a medical professional. However, she is intercepted by Ananda Kar, whose name ironically signifies joy. Rather than offering a traditional intervention, Ananda proposes a three-day course in the technicalities of self-destruction, arguing that formal training will prevent the social humiliation of a failed attempt.

Ananda Kar serves as the director of the "Hemlock Society," an institution housed within a film studio designed to instruct individuals on effective methods of ending their lives. The faculty members—including Trainlet, Jhulan, Dhamani, Raktim, and Shikha—possess pseudonyms that correspond to their specific areas of expertise in lethal techniques. Meghna joins this group of aspirants, leaving behind a farewell note that leaves her father, Dr. Basu, in a state of profound distress. As Dr. Basu and his partner, Niharika, initiate an exhaustive search for her, Meghna begins her unconventional education.

Throughout the workshop, Meghna is exposed to various perspectives on human mortality. By observing the struggles of her peers, she undergoes a significant metamorphosis, realizing the comparative privilege of her own circumstances and the devastating impact her death would have on her family. On the final day, she expresses a renewed desire to live, fueled in part by her burgeoning romantic feelings for Ananda. In a somber revelation, Ananda discloses that he suffers from Lymphocytopenia, a terminal condition that limits his life expectancy to a mere two years.

Meghna departs the society in tears and reunites with her father. She is deeply moved by Ananda's ability to live life to the fullest despite his impending demise, eventually discovering that the Hemlock Society is actually a preventative institution dedicated to life affirmation. The story advances six months to a nursing home where Meghna reconciles with Ananda during a blood transfusion, a scene suggesting a more hopeful medical prognosis than previously stated. The film concludes with a touch of irony as Meghna's now-distraught former fiancé is escorted toward the Hemlock Society, implying the beginning of a new cycle.

== Cast ==
- Koel Mallick as Meghna Sarkar
- Parambrata Chatterjee as Ananda Kar, the owner of Hemlock Society
- Dipankar De as Dr. Chittaranjan "Chitto" Basu, Meghna's Father
- Roopa Ganguly as Niharika Basu, Chitto's second wife and Meghna's Step Mother
- Reeta Basu as Mrs. Sarkar, Chitto's first wife and Meghna's Mother (deceased)
- Saheb Chatterjee as Shantanu, Meghna's ex-boyfriend
- Silajit Majumder as Siddhartha Roy, a Singer
- Anindita Bose as Shreya, Shantanu's love interest
- Biswajit Chakraborty as Inspector

=== Special appearances ===
- Soumitra Chatterjee as Colonel Samaresh Bagchi
- Sabitri Chatterjee as Jhulawn Gupto
- Jeet as himself
- Sabyasachi Chakrabarty as Dr. Dhawmoni Ghosh
- Srijit Mukherji as Dawyal Khashnobish
- Bratya Basu as Raktim Ganguly
- Barun Chanda as Trenlet Biswas
- Raj Chakraborty as Setu Venkataraman
- Indranath Mukherjee as the effeminate history professor
- Akshay Kapoor as Invigilator/ Sign Language Interpreter
- Reetabrata Ghosh as Gun case
- Sudeshna Roy as Shikha Dhar
- Sohag Sen as Miss Cella Neous
- Priyanka Sarkar as Hiya

== Soundtrack ==
Hemlock Society

Soundtrack album by Anupam Roy and Indraadip Dasgupta
- Released: 2 September 2018
- Recorded: 2011
- Genre: Feature film soundtrack
- Length: 29:59
- Language: Bengali
- Label: SVF Music

Official audio
- Hemlock Society on YouTube

The soundtrack is composed Anupam Roy and Indraadip Dasgupta. All the lyrics are written by Anupam Roy.

Track list
No.	Title	Singer(s)	Length
1.	"Amar Mawte (Female)"	Lopamudra Mitra	5:30
2.	"Ekhon Anek Raat"	Anupam Roy	3:46
3.	"Ei To Ami Chai"	Shreya Ghoshal & Anupam Roy	4:30
4.	"Jawl Phoring"	Silajit Majumder	3:28
5.	"Amar Mawte (Male)"	Rupankar Bagchi	3:44
6.	"Phiriye Dewar Gaan"	Rupam Islam	5:52
7.	"Hemlock Society Theme"	Composed by Indrajit Dasgupta	3:28
Total length:			29:59

== Reception and awards ==
The film received generally positive reviews by critics. Parambrata Chatterjee's performance was critically applauded, as was Koel Mallick's. It has received 21 awards till now. Srijit Mukherji and Koel Mallick got the Shoilojanando Mukherjee Memorial Awards for Direction and Acting respectively. Parambrata Chatterjee received the Anandalok Award for Best Actor, while Anupam Roy got the Anandalok Award for the Best Song (Ekhon Onek Raat). At the Mirchi Music Awards 2013, it got the Best Album and Best Song (Ekhon Onek Raat) in the Listener's Choice category as well as the Best Male Playback for Rupankar Bagchi for Aamar Mawte. At the 13th Telecine Awards, it got Parambrata Chatterjee the Special Jury Award for acting, and Anupam Roy, the Best Lyricist Award. It also got the Best Movie Poster at the Srijon Shawmman 2013. At the Bengal Youth Awards 2013, Srijit Mukherji and Anupam Roy got the Best Director and the Best Music Director Awards respectively. Anupam Roy also got the Best Male Playback for Ekhon Onek Raat in the ETV Shongeet Shawmman 2013. It also got the prestigious BFJA award, the oldest film award in India, for Best Actress, Best Actor (Jury's choice), Best Male Playback, Best Female Playback (Female) and Best Art Direction. It also fetched the Zee Banglar Gourab Samman for Anupam Roy for Best Lyricist and Male Playback for Ekhon Onek Raat and Best Actress for Koel Mallick.

== Remake ==
Umesh Ghadge, who has previously worked as an associate director on films like Dhoom and Once Upon a Time in Mumbaai, remade the film as Welcome Zindagi in Marathi. Urmila Matondkar had been approached for Koel's role, and Atul Kulkarni, was offered Parambrata's role, however he turned down the project despite taking an immense liking to the script. The titular roles are finally being played by Amruta Khanvilkar and Swapnil Joshi.
