= Dawshom Awbotaar =

Bengali neo noir film by Srijit Mukherji

- Theatrical release poster
- Directed by: Srijit Mukherji
- Written by: Srijit Mukherji
- Produced by: Shrikant Mohta; Mahendra Soni; Jyoti Deshpande
- Starring: Prosenjit Chatterjee; Anirban Bhattacharya; Jisshu Sengupta; Jaya Ahsan
- Cinematography: Soumik Haldar
- Edited by: Pronoy Dasgupta
- Music by: Songs: Anupam Roy; Background score: Indraadip Dasgupta
- Production companies: Shree Venkatesh Films; Jio Studios
- Distributed by: SVF
- Release date: 19 October 2023
- Running time: 154 minutes
- Country: India
- Language: Bengali

Dawshom Awbotaar...For God's Sake (transl. The 10th Avatar... For God's Sake) is a 2023 Indian Bengali-language neo-noir buddy cop black comedy action thriller film written and directed by Srijit Mukherji. Produced by Shrikant Mohta, Mahendra Soni and Jyoti Deshpande under the banners of Shree Venkatesh Films and Jio Studios, the film serves the fourth installment in Mukherji's Cop Universe. It stars Jisshu Sengupta in the titular role, alongside Prosenjit Chatterjee, Anirban Bhattacharya and Jaya Ahsan in lead roles. Set in 2003 Kolkata, the film follows Probir Roy Chowdhury and Bijoy Poddar, two serial-killing experts from Lalbazar, being hired to solve several gruesome murders of people involved with corruptions, where the killer claims himself to be the Kalki Avatar.

The film serves as a prequel crossover to the previous films of the franchise, Baishe Srabon (2011) and Vinci Da (2019) and the fourth film ever from a cinematic universe in Bengali cinema's first. Dawshom Awbotaar marks Mukherji's collaboration with Chatterjee for the eleventh time, with Bhattacharya in his seventh, with Sengupta in his eighth and with Ahsan for the third time. It was officially announced in March 2023, and principal photography commenced in July 2023, with filming taking places in Kolkata and Howrah. Songs of the film is composed by Anupam Roy, while Indraadip Dasgupta provides its score. The cinematography of the film is handled by Soumik Halder, while Pronoy Dasgupta edited the film. Filming wrapped by August 2023 in 12 working days, making as one of the shortest periods in which a Bengali film has been shot.

Dawshom Awobotaar theatrically released on 19 October 2023, on the occasion of Durga Puja. It was a box office blockbuster with the chemistry between Chatterjee and Bhattacharya and the songs gaining praise. However, criticism were directed towards the length, pace, climax, thrill and the romantic subplot of the movie.

A tribute to detective writer Agatha Christie, Dawshom Awbotaar is claimed by the makers to be the start of the Probir Roy Chowdhury franchise. A direct sequel, featuring Prosenjit Chatterjee and Anirban Bhattacharya reprising their roles, was confirmed at the end of the film.

== Plot ==
The film begins in 2003 where Probir Roy Chowdhury is reintroduced, with a slightly different hairstyle, as a serial killer expert who is notoriously ill-tempered and foul-mouthed. In 1999, he nearly avoided being suspended, with the help of special permission, after he was put up on a trial for shooting dead Monty Haldar, the son of an influential promoter (which thereby retcons his suspension date mentioned in Baishe Srabon to a year between 2004 and 2009). His colleague Amit Kumar Srivastava, irritated by his rash nature, reminded him that his trial is still going on and advised him to control his temper because the department still needs him. At a bar, Probir meets, in a hilarious encounter, a young, energetic, yet short-tempered Bijoy Poddar, then a clean-shaven inspector, who was shutting down the bar and was about to arrest Probir for his "annoying" nature before being embarrassed by Probir's identity card.

Around the same time, Probir, shown to be cynical yet overconfident about his capabilities, is brought in for investigating the murder of a promoter, devoured to death in his bathtub by a handful of red-bellied piranhas after being cornered at gunpoint by an intruder. He learns that the promoter is also a fearsome don of that area who had killed multiple people to usurp their lands. Also, he was further accused of creating faulty buildings after accepting bribes and has escaped the clutches of law due to his political connections. At the crime spot, Probir finds a Tulsi bead necklace which is used for worship by Vaishnavites; further investigating, he learns that red-bellied piranhas are rare to find and their sales are declared illegal. One month later, the same intruder, disguised as a massage parlour worker, brutally bludgeoned his client to death with a tortoise idol and leaves behind two Tulsi bead necklaces before escaping. The client turns out to be a businessman-cum-money-lender who was a politically influential associate of the sand and coal mafias. Investigating the crime and remembering the case of the promoter, he theorised a series of gruesome serial killings, using a modus operandi inspired by the ten avatars of Vishnu where the victims would be influential figures in society, accused of heinous crimes or corruption. The first murder took inspiration from Matsya, while the second one from Kurma. Commissioner Rajat Basu of Kolkata Police assigns Probir to address this escalating crisis. Poddar, who takes a keen interest in serial killing cases, joins Probir in this mission at the behest of latter's request to the high authorities.

The duo immerses themselves in unravelling the motive behind the killings and deep dives into creating a profile as well as the anecdotes of the mythology to join the dots. However, they soon turn to be bickering in nature, constantly pulling each other's leg at the slightest opportunity. Meanwhile, Poddar's origin was revealed: he was born in a brothel in Kalighat after his mother was cheated and gives free tuition classes to children from red light area before going for duty. While casually talking about his origins to Probir, Poddar reveals that his father was a sex-addict and visited several prostitution houses throughout the city, leading to a possibility of him having a number of brothers and sisters, to whom he humorously refers as "Khoka"(s) or "Khuki"(s).

Soon, another murder takes place and this time, it's of a politically influential doctor, who was accused of three medical negligence, who consumed poisoned pork sausage while having breakfast in a hotel; clearly, this murder took inspiration from Varaha, as the killer, taking job as a janitor in the hotel, replaced the non-poisonous sausage with the poisonous one. While investigating, the duo retrieved three Tulsi bead necklaces and learnt that the janitor has escaped the hotel leading to a chase between the duo and the killer. However, even after a hilarious near-accident, the duo fail to capture him. A few days later, a young psychiatrist named Moitreyee Ghatak reaches out to Probir and Poddar, claiming to know the killer's identity. One of Moitreyee's patients, Biswaroop Bardhan, suffers from an extreme case of god complex, firmly believing himself to be Kalki, the Dawshom Awbotaar (tenth avatar) of Vishnu. He justifies the killings as a moral cleansing of society, targeting those he perceives as evil. Having grown up listening to the stories of Dashavatara from his father ever since his childhood, he developed an obsession with the stories and was indeed behind the three murders.

That same evening, the fourth murder took place: a renowned criminal lawyer, infamous for commuting the death penalty of Ajmal Sheikh (apparently the mastermind behind the infamous Chakdaha bomb blast) to life imprisonment, was killed when the lift of his flat, sabotaged by Biswaroop, crashed down after being stuck mid-way. Moitreyee was evidently disturbed by the mourning of the lawyer's family while Probir admires Biswaroop's intelligence, considering him to be a worthy opponent. After finding four Tulsi bead necklaces from the crime scene, Probir explains to the stunned Poddar how this fourth murder indeed took inspiration from Narasimha: the lift was neither a man nor a beast, neither in indoors nor in outdoors, neither on the top floor nor on the ground floor and of course, not a weapon while the death itself took place neither in day nor in night. With this breakthrough revelation, the hunt for Biswaroop intensifies throughout the city.

Meanwhile, Poddar and Moitreyee form a close bond as she assists the police in gathering more information on Biswaroop, much to the disdain of Probir, whose wife and son were brutally murdered years back, leaving Probir broken, deranged and alcoholic. When Probir decided to use Moitreyee as a bait to capture Bishwaroop (and in the process mocked her), Poddar furiously lashes against him; he accuses Probir of being mentally insane who suffers from schadenfreude and that he can't tolerate anyone's happiness after his family died. This led to an infuriated Probir engaging in a brawl with Poddar, leaving the latter traumatised. Nevertheless, at the behest of Moitreyee, Poddar apologised to Probir and the duo reconciled.

As a sleazy college teacher is murdered by being kicked down onto the Metro tracks (with the murder evidently taking inspiration from Vamana, as evident from five Tulsi bead necklaces found from the crime scene) and their search for the serial killer yields no positive results, Probir and Poddar find themselves once again in a heated argument as the former wanted to gamble Moitreyee's life and use her as a bait to draw Biswaroop out. Despite Poddar's disapproval, Moitreyee agrees to the plan, and the police keep watch on her, hoping the killer to make contact. However, Moitreyee has one condition: since Biswaroop is mentally unstable, he shouldn't be killed but sent to medical supervision. To this, Probir claims that he will do so but will indeed kill Biswaroop if he tries to attack him. One night, when Poddar leaves Moitreyee at her place, she is shocked to find Biswaroop, wearing the prosthetic mask of an old man, waiting for her. He confronts her angrily, accusing her of being a spy who betrayed his trust and revealing his identity to the police. Probir's intuition compels him and Poddar to rush back to Moitreyee's place, only to be greeted by Biswaroop, having removed his mask, holding Moitreeyee at gunpoint.

Holding them captive, Biswaroop reveals his motives and why he executed all the five murders. He opens up on the gruesome murder of his father (an honest and brave journalist) by the businessman and how it affected his psyche. He declares that now he is determined to continue his duty of morally cleansing the society and tells the cops that they're the befitting targets on his list (Probir because he is extremely sadistic in nature and Poddar simply because he is Probir's side-kick). Probir provokes Bishwaroop by labelling him not as an avatar but as an asura to which, Biswaroop moves close to strike a fatal blow with an axe. But Probir unties himself just in time and shoots dead Biswaroop at point blank range with a mini-pistol, hidden in his shoe. In a twisted revelation, it is revealed that Moitreyee is, in fact, Biswaroop's younger sister, who is now devastated and begins to mourn Biswaroop. Days later, as Moitreyee visits the hills for a vacation with Poddar after completing the legal formalities of being the royal witness, Probir, while filing the final reports back in Kolkata, goes through the files of this case and senses that something is amiss.

As Moitreyee describes how the death of his father and her subsequent rape at the hands of the businessman left her brother in exiling himself into a room completely alone and how she herself became completely numb, Poddar suddenly realized that logically, the first victim of Bishwaroop should not have been the promoter but the businessman and asked Moitreyee whether he began cleansing society before avenging his family. As Probir urgently tries to contact Poddar in vain, Moitreyee, after reciting Rainer Maria Rilke's Go to the Limits of Your Longing to claim that she indeed got the God's hand of revenge, finally revealed her backstory. Her journalist father had discovered how the businessman was connected to the mafia and wrote article exposing his secrets. Receiving threats, her father had to escape to Kanpur with his family. Yet, he continued returning to Kolkata for coverage and as such had a public scuffle with the businessman whom he threatened to expose. To this, the businessman and his henchmen tracked them to Kanpur, murdered her father and raped her. The trauma of the events sent Biswaroop to rehab; upon returning, he became desperate for revenge. To avoid suspicion, Moitreyee and Biswaroop meticulously crafted a plan (by planning to murder another politically influential criminal first to cover the subsequent murder of the businessman) that would outwit the suspicious eyes of law enforcement. Moitreyee, well aware of her brother's profound fixation on mythology, particularly the ten avatars of Vishnu, planned to execute the promoter's murder in a manner that seamlessly blends into a sinister tapestry of serial killings, shielding them from any semblance of suspicion or hint of foul play in each individual murder. As per the plan, Bishwaroop will act as Moitreyee's patient in the eyes of the world to avoid suspicion. After the two murders being executed, they planned to escape while the police will assume that the serial killer is neutralised.

Despite the two murders being executed, the plan backfired terribly: Bishwaroop was completely driven insane from the night of the first murder itself and began to consider himself as Kalki, and despite pleas of Moitreyee, declared his intention of cleansing the society by killing more criminals. With the third murder ultimately occurring, Moitreyee, burdened by guilt and fear, ultimately sought the aid of the police. Upon hearing the truth, Poddar is horrified and infuriated, and began to feel that he was actually used by Moitreyee, in the guise of romance, throughout the entire fiasco. Moitreyee, despite genuinely loving Poddar, is faced by him questioning the depth of her love for him, while brutally cussing her, clearly filled with vehement disgust at her involvement in the serial killings. Overwhelmed by despair, she proceeds towards the cliff, relinquishing her life that had lost all purposes and hope and jumped off the cliff. A shocked Poddar rushed to save her but failed. When Probir finally manages to contact Poddar, he realises he is too late. With the case tragically closed, Probir, in a cold yet sympathetic attitude, suggests Poddar to return soon so that they can have a drink.

By the time the year 2004 arrived, Poddar has now become a heavy drinker. Nevertheless, the Probir-Poddar duo are brought on board once again to investigate a new case of serial killing in Kolkata.

== Cast ==
- Prosenjit Chatterjee as Probir Roy Chowdhury
- Anirban Bhattacharya as Inspector Bijoy Poddar
- Jisshu Sengupta as Biswaroop Bardhan, the self-proclaimed Kalki Avatar
- Jaya Ahsan as Moitreyee Ghatak
- Rajat Ganguly as Commissioner Rajat Basu
- Animesh Bhaduri as Biswaroop's father
- Rajesh Sharma as Amit Kumar Srivastav

== Production ==
=== Announcement ===
The film was announced with the revelation of the film's logo on 19 July 2023 at Basu Bati in Bagbazar, North Kolkata. The event was marked by the presence of Srijit Mukherji, the lead actors of the film, the singers and the music directors. On 6 September 2023, the first look of the lead characters and the first poster of the film was released.

=== Casting ===
The lead cast was revealed on 20 July 2023 with a motion logo from SVF. Later, Subhashree Ganguly was replaced by Jaya Ahsan due to Subhashree's second pregnancy, as she needed rest.

=== Filming ===
Most of the filming was done in Kolkata and Howrah. The film went on the floors on 21 July 2023 and was wrapped up on midnight of 12 August 2023.

=== Marketing ===
The trailer was released on 24 September 2023 on SVF YouTube channel. The television rights was acquired by Star Jalsha of the Star Network. It was premiered on Star Jalsha on 18 August 2024.

== Music ==
Dawshom Awbotaar

Soundtrack album by Anupam Roy
- Recorded: 2023
- Studios: Shrutinandan Studio, Sonic Solutions
- Genre: Feature film soundtrack
- Length: 21m 57s
- Language: Bengali
- Label: SVF Music
- Producers: Shree Venkatesh Films & Jio Studios

Anupam Roy chronology
Ardhangini (2023)	Dawshom Awbotaar (2023)	Pradhan (2023)

Official audio
- Dawshom Awbotaar - Full Album on YouTube

Singles from Dawshom Awbotaar
- 1. "Ami Shei Manushta Aar Nei (Male Version)" Released: 30 September 2023; 2. "Baundule Ghuri" Released: 6 October 2023; 3. "Agunkheko" Released: 15 October 2023; 4. "Dawsh Awbotaar Stotro" Released: 3 November 2023; 5. "Ami Shei Manushta Aar Nei- Reprise (Female Version)" Released: 3 November 2023

The soundtrack album is composed by Anupam Roy and the background score is composed by Indraadip Dasgupta. The lyrics are written by Anupam Roy (except Dawsh Awbotaar Stotra). The Dawsh Awbotaar Stotra is taken from Gita Govinda, a collection of mantras written by Jayadeva. The singers are Anupam Roy, Ajoy Chakrabarty, Rupam Islam, Arijit Singh, Shreya Ghoshal and Paloma Majumder.

The first single "Ami Shei Manushta Aar Nei (Male Version)" was released on 30 September 2023. The second single "Baundule Ghuri" was released on 6 October 2023. The third single "Agunkheko" was released on 15 October 2023. Rest of the songs were released on 3 November 2023.

Track listing
No.	Title	Singer(s)	Length
1.	"Ami Shei Manushta Aar Nei (Male Version)"	Anupam Roy	5:11
2.	"Baundule Ghuri"	Arijit Singh, Shreya Ghosal	5:43
3.	"Agunkheko"	Rupam Islam	3:57
4.	"Dawsh Awbotaar Stotro"	Ajoy Chakrabarty	4:45
5.	"Ami Shei Manushta Aar Nei- Reprise (Female Version)"	Paloma Majumder	2:20
Total length:			21:57

== Release ==
=== Theatrical ===
The film was released in the theatres on 19 October 2023, on the occasion of Durga Puja.

=== Home media ===
The digital rights of the film was acquired by "Hoichoi". It was premiered on the streaming platform on 2 February 2024. On television, it was premiered on Jalsha Movies on 18 August 2024.

== Reception ==
=== Critical reception ===
Poorna Banerjee of The Times of India rated the film 3.5 out of 5 stars and wrote "With romance blooming in the second part, the story slows down considerably, and then moves towards a slightly drawn-out climax. There are a few loose ends and absurd situations that could have been better summed up or tightened at the end. But the palpable chemistry between Prosenjit and Anirban is a rare treat, and definitely one of the main reasons why Dawshom Awbotaar is an entertaining watch this festive season." Shaunak Sanyal of Ei Samay rated the film 4.5 out of 5 stars and wrote " The main thrust of Dawshom Awbotaar is his story and the acting of all the main characters is also excellent. But where the noise is, is the script. Like the rest of the movies in the cop universe, this one also has a lot of poetry." Anandabazar Patrika also reviewed the film.

Agnivo Niyogi of Telegraph India wrote " The chemistry between Probir and Bijoy forms the backbone of Dawshom Awbotaar. Jisshu Sengupta stands out as the maniacal killer who exudes a sense of unnerving unpredictability and menace. Jaya Ahsan shines too. The songs composed by Anupam Roy and the background score by Indraadip Dasgupta elevate the narrative, evoking nostalgia and providing a soulful backdrop to the story. Yet, compared to Baishe Srabon, the plot of Dawshom Awbotaar comes across as simplistic. Sandipta Bhanja of Sangbad Pratidin rated the film 4.5 out of 5 stars. Premankur Biswas of The Indian Express rated the film 4 out of 5 stars and wrote " One can say that the actors are committed to their roles, but what does that even mean when the script is as weak as this."

=== Box office ===
The producers SVF have informed that the film has grossed ₹6 crore (US$620,000) at the box-office.
