= Vinci Da =

2019 Indian Bengali thriller film

- Film poster
- Directed by: Srijit Mukherji
- Screenplay by: Srijit Mukherji
- Story by: Rudranil Ghosh; Srijit Mukherji
- Starring: Rudranil Ghosh; Ritwik Chakraborty; Anirban Bhattacharya; Sohini Sarkar; Bharat Kaul; Gautam Moitra
- Cinematography: Sudipta Majumdar
- Edited by: Pronoy Dasgupta
- Music by: Anupam Roy
- Production company: Shree Venkatesh Films
- Release date: 12 April 2019
- Running time: 117 minutes
- Country: India
- Language: Bengali

Vinci Da is a 2019 Indian Bengali language psychological action thriller film directed by Srijit Mukherji, under the banner of SVF Entertainment Pvt Ltd, starring Rudranil Ghosh, Ritwick Chakraborty, Anirban Bhattacharya, Sohini Sarkar, Riddhi Sen, and Gautam Moitra. The music was composed by Anupam Roy with cinematography by Sudipta Majundar and editing by Pronoy Dasgupta. The film released on 12 April 2019. It was remade in Telugu in 2023 as Ravanasura.

Initially presented as a standalone thriller, in March 2023, Mukherji revealed his plan of directing a prequel crossover of Vinci Da and Baishe Srabon, with Anirban reprising his role, as part of his planned cop universe (thereby making Vinci Da the second instalment of the planned cop universe), to be releasing on Puja 2023. In April 2023, Jio Studios, in collaboration with SVF, announced the title of the film as Dawshom Awbotaar.

== Plot ==
The film starts with a flashback set years ago when a teenager witnesses his father drunkenly beating his mother. He coldly asks his father to stop, but the latter pushes him out and insults him by labelling him as a bastard. Disgusted of the everyday torture, the teenager bludgeoned his father to dead with his cricket bat in front of his horrified mother and calls the police to confess. Thirty minutes after the murder, the clock strikes 12 and the teenager turns eighteen.

The narrative then shifts to the present timeline. The protagonist of this film narrates his story: he was the son of Debiprasad Bhowmik, a makeup artist who raised his son after the mother died young. Inspired by his father's dedication towards his work, the protagonist decided to follow his footsteps by having a career in makeup. He began to study it and also delved into prosthetics, special effects, plastic surgery, etc. He began to have a fixation on the Italian artist Leonardo da Vinci. When he tried to defend Da Vinci as the supreme artiste to two pseudo-intellectuals of Tolly para, he was mockingly addressed as Da Vinci's fan Vinci Da. That name became so popular that it stuck with the protagonist.

A businessman named Shyamsundar Jaiswal gets unconditional acquittal after facing a trial on chit fund scam of ₹2500 crores (due to lack of any substantial evidence against him). Around the same time, Vinci Da's father dies, leaving Vinci alone and helpless. With the help of his father's friend, Vinci enters Tollywood but is immediately blacklisted due to his multiple arguments with directors, producers and superstars who do not appreciate his talent. Meanwhile, two more criminals are acquitted: MLA Mrinmoy Saha's son named Manas who had run over five people sleeping on the pavement after driving while drunk (which also led to the death of his girlfriend after the car hit the divider) after his driver is forced to take the blame; and a perverted page 3 celebrity Sunny Sen who is infamous for his rape cases, the trials of which he survives after influencing the fates of the judges (murder, transfer, etc.). Also introduced is Jaya, Vinci's love interest, who is a stutterer and supportive to Vinci and his struggles.

The teenager at the start of the film is revealed to be Adi Bose. Vinci narrates that right from the days of his troublesome childhood, he aspired to be a criminal lawyer and was hyper-obsessed with the concept of law. Despite having a sharp mind and being very well read, the trauma of his father's regular drunken attacks on his beloved mother pushed him to such an extent that he finally killed his father. Since he was technically seventeen years old at the time of murdering his father, Adi escaped the death penalty. Despite saving his mother, the mother testified against him ironically. Accepting his fate as a criminal, he ends up in a mental asylum; out of sheer dedication, he continued studying Law even inside the asylum. After being released from the asylum, he started going to the court where he started taking notes on the difficult cases. Then he set up his own highly successful office outside the courtroom where experienced lawyers would take his advice on cases. But by that time, he had become completely psychotic in nature, to the point he began to place law above life and death.

Vinci's father's friend advises him to adjust with the industry's naggings but Vinci vehemently refuses to shed his integrity. Days later, Adi began to spy on Shyamsundar, extracting all the necessary information related to him. Next, he approaches Vinci and tricks him into making the mask of Shyamsundar, as part of a biopic. As per Adi's request, Vinci creates a sample which Adi dons; with it, he goes and robs a bank, killing a security guard in the process. Panicked, the real Shyamsundar takes refuge in his farmhouse; the ruthless DCDD Bijoy Poddar takes the charge of the case, tracks Shyamsundar down to his farmhouse from where the latter is arrested after a firefight with the police. Next day, Vinci sees the news (alongside how Shyamsundar's school-going daughter was admitted to hospital after she tried to commit suicide) and becomes distraught after realising the truth. Adi visits Vinci and when the latter confronts him, Adi reveals that he is a serial lawyer: a mentally disturbed serial killer who chooses his victims according to a pattern stuck in his mind. His targets are those who, thanks to their influence, escaped the hands of law after committing heinous crimes and he plans to hand them to the law after impersonating them in crimes having clear public evidence. Vinci is appalled seeing how the innocent people (especially like the security guard or Shyamsundar's daughter) are suffering due to Adi's vigilantism which the latter brushes off as collateral damage. Adi believes himself to be Nietzsche's Übermensch, who is above man-made laws and rules of society. Adi then coerces Vinci into creating a mask of Manas. Later, Vinci laments to Jaya how he feels trapped to which Jaya claims she will always be by his side, no matter what.

Adi traps Manas in an empty street, makes him unconscious and takes his place in the car, wearing the mask of Manas. He then drives the car on five people sleeping on the footpath and kills them, tries to break the CCTV in vain (as a false lead) and then hits the car to a divider a little bit away from the crime scene before putting Manas in the driving seat. Removing the mask and wiping the incriminating fingerprints, Adi walks away whistling, while Manas ends up in Poddar's jail the next day where he is beaten up by Poddar. Despite the MLA pleading that his son is innocent, the evidences are up against him this time. A devastated Vinci visits the spot where he sees a child selling incense sticks; it turns out that he is actually the son of one of the five victims of Adi. The plight of the son and his mother shattered Vinci so much that he tearfully begged to Adi to spare him in vain. When Vinci lashes out at Adi by labelling him as mad, Adi smirks and mentions his madness is methodical before coldly threatening him that if he doesn't cooperate, he will hand over the videos he shot, where Vinci is making the masks, to the police and Vinci will be accused as the mastermind. For the third and final attack, Adi's victim will be Sunny. As Adi leaves Vinci's home after giving him Sunny's details, Vinci began to throw all his life's possessions while screaming in agony; simultaneously, his narration makes it clear that he was indeed trapped now. Either the police will arrest him or Adi will kill him or he will commit suicide out of guilt.

The third attack takes place with Adi, wearing the mask of Sunny, raping a woman after making her unconscious and releases the video of the act on media. Naturally, Sunny is arrested along with his cache of other disgusting videos and this latest video repulsed Poddar so much that he ordered a brutal torture of Sunny inside the lock-up to the point some of the latter's nerves were permanently damaged. While Sunny got on bail, his wife divorced him and took custody of their two daughters. Despite Sunny's lawyer's claims of the video being fake, Sunny's life was destroyed. Days later, Vinci visits Adi's home where the latter is celebrating his victory by having a drink. When Vinci requested to give him the incriminating videos of him making the masks, Adi refuses to do so, claiming they are safe with him as he believes Vinci may one day report the incidents to the police. When Adi graphically describes how he raped a random woman while wearing condom, Vinci began to feel unwell. Flashbacks reveal that the said random woman was none other than Jaya herself. She instructs Vinci to meet her, and when he sees the video, he is horrified to realise his folly. While Vinci claims it be an accident and that it's not her fault, she screams out how she is being blamed before trying to consume poison. Shocked, Vinci saves her in the nick of time and both of them suffer from emotional breakdown. He promises Jaya that her honour won't be tarnished and vows to leave the city after killing Adi.

Back in present, Poddar visits Adi's home to investigate after the latter apparently committed suicide after having a poisoned drink and recording his confessions on a video camera. While it apparently looks an open-and-shut case, Poddar remembers that he actually met Adi many days ago at a police station, before the first crime, where Adi handed a pickpocket to the authorities after beating him up. Despite the circumstantial evidences, things don't add up for Poddar. The narrative then resumes from Adi's graphic description of raping Jaya: when Adi leaves the room to bring water, Vinci immediately adds poison to Adi's drink. Adi had the poisoned drink and claimed that he improvised the chor-police (crook-cop) game into chor-police-ukil (crook-cop-lawyer) game where he used to play the role of the lawyer; to this, Vinci calmly claims that he improvised the game into chor-police-ukil-judge-jollad (crook-cop-lawyer-judge-executioner) game where he used to play the dual roles of the judge and the executioner. Adi, feeling dizzy, realised that he is trapped before falling down on the table dead. Vinci then proceeds to wear a mask resembling Adi and shoots a video proclaiming that he is taking his own life. Manipulating all the necessary evidences, Vinci escapes the spot.

Poddar soon detects the difference in the voices of the actual Adi and the one recorded in the clip. He discovers the videos recorded by Adi of Vinci at his home, and orders his arrest. However, by that time, Vinci and Jaya have fled the city, disguised as an old couple, leaving his years of labour behind.

== Cast ==
- Rudranil Ghosh as Vinci Da
- Ritwick Chakraborty as Adi Bose
  - Riddhi Sen as young Adi Bose (Special appearance)
- Anirban Bhattacharya as DCDD Bijoy Poddar
- Sohini Sarkar as Jaya
- Bharat Kaul as Shyamsundar Jaiswal
- Aryann Roy as Manas Saha
- Srijit Mukherji as School Principal
- Gautam Moitra as Criminal Lawyer

== Soundtrack ==
Vinci Da

Soundtrack album by Anupam Roy
- Released: 16 March 2019
- Studio: Sonic Solution
- Genre: Film soundtrack
- Length: 12:50
- Language: Bengali
- Label: SVF

Anupam Roy chronology
Shah Jahan Regency (2019)	Vinci Da (2019)	Konttho (2019)

All songs written and composed by Anupam Roy and background music scored by Indraadip Dasgupta.

Track list
No.	Title	Music	Singer(S)	Length
1.	"Tomar Moner Bhetor"	Anupam Roy	Mainul Ahsan Noble	4:15
2.	"Shanto Hou"	Anupam Roy	Anupam Roy	4:52
3.	"Gas Balloon"	Anupam Roy	Anupam Roy	3:43
Total length:				12:50

== Reception ==
=== Critical response ===
Debolina Sen of The Times of India scored the film at 3.5 out of 5 stars and says "For a film that keeps you impressed with the rapid pace all throughout, it does have a predictable ending. Vinci Da is at best an interesting crime film, which has dollops of drama in the screenplay."The New Indian Express wrote "Vinci Da" breaks every glass ceiling that the 'thriller' genre in India has ever encountered and savours the shards as they penetrate the very core of the concept of crime and atonement."Business Standard wrote "Vinci Da" is a remarkable work for the way it blurs the lines of morality to show how easily a clever man can jump from the right side to the wrong. And how weak can be manipulated by the strong. It's also remarkable for showing the close relationship between crime and art, and between the criminal and his conscience."

== Accolades ==
- 4th Filmfare Awards Bangla - Filmfare Award Bangla for Best Film
