= Parambrata Chattopadhyay filmography =

Indian film actor, director, producer, and television personality

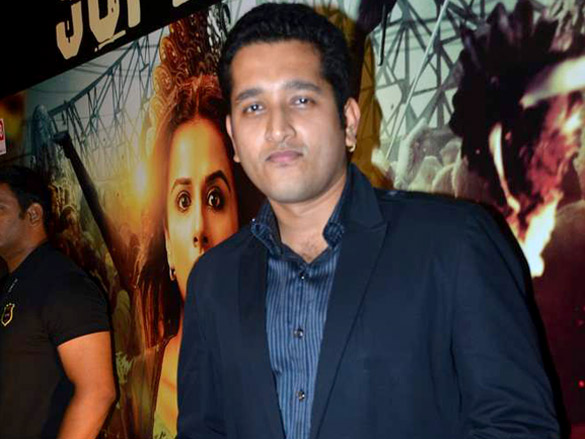
Chatterjee in 2012

Parambrata Chattopadhyay is an Indian actor, director, producer, and television personality. He has a significant following in West Bengal, India. Parambrata started his career with Bengali television and films. He made his Hindi debut in Kahaani (2012), starring Vidya Balan. He had earlier acted in Bhalo Theko (2003), Vidya Balan's debut film. Seven months after the success of Kahaani, he was signed by Jeffrey D. Brown (who had won an Academy Award for his debut short film in 1986) for his film Sold.

He has a good knowledge of world music and has sung for some Bengali films like Chaya Manush and Samantaral. He has acted in many television series, tele-films, short films and features. He has produced/directed several films/web series. Parambrata made his directorial debut with the feature film Jiyo Kaka, starring Rituparna Sengupta and Rudranil Ghosh. His second directorial venture was Hawa Bodol.

== As director and co-producer ==
Year	Title	Role	Director	Co-producer	Notes
2006	Premer Galpo		Yes	No	Telefilm
2006	Sarate Prem		Yes	No	Telefilm
2007	QSQT Policer Duty		Yes	No	Telefilm
2011	Jiyo Kaka		Yes	No	
2013	Hawa Bodol	Jeet	Yes	Yes	
2015	Lorai: Play to Live	Naxalite leader Manas (special appearance)	Yes	No	
2017	Feluda (2017)	Pradosh Chandra Mitra (Feluda)	Yes	Yes	TV & Web Series
2018	Shonar Pahar	Rajdeep	Yes	No	
2018	Shesh Theke Shuru		No	Yes	Story Writer
2018	Mafia		No	Yes	Web Series
2018	Kaali		No	Yes	Web Series-Season 1,2
2019	Sharate Aaj	Mahbub	No	Yes	Story, Screenplay, Dialogues
2020	Tiki-Taka	Raju, Taxi driver	Yes	Yes	
2020	Damayanti		No	Yes	Web Series
2021	Nokol Heere		No	Yes	Web Series
2021	Tangra Blues	Sanjib Mondal	No	Yes	
2021	Bony	Sabyasachi Mukherjee	Yes	No	
2021	F.I.R No. 339/07/06		No	Yes	
2022	Abhijaan	Dr. Sanjoy Sen	Yes	Yes	
2022	Boudi Canteen	Sourish	Yes	Yes	
2022	Shohorer Ushnotomo Din E		No	Yes	
2023	Biye Bibhrat		No	Yes	
2025	Ei Raat Tomar Aamar		Yes	No	
2025	Bhog		Yes	No	Web Series
2026	Roktofolok				Web Series
2026	Abar Hawa Bodol				
TBA	Ekhane Ondhokar				
TBA	Antidote				

== Acting credits ==
Key
Denotes films that have not yet been released

Movies
Year	Title	Role	Notes
2002	Hemanter Pakhi	Babai	National Film Award for Best Feature Film in Bengali
2003	Bombaiyer Bombete	Topshe	
2003	Sheshkritya	Shankho	Telefilm (ETV Bangla)
2003	Bhalo Theko	Deep	
2003	Shortcut Prem	Ratan	Telefilm (ETV Bangla)
2003	Ektu Bhalobashar Jonno		Telefilm
2004	Swapna Sundari	Sayantan (Santu)	Telefilm (ETV Bangla)
2005	Shubhodrishti	Romen	
2005	Nishijapon	Shyamal	
2005	Ekdin Pratidin	Unknown	Television series (Zee Bangla)
2005	Ekchhut	Unknown	Telefilm
2006	Ankush	Rahul Mukherjee	Telefilm (Nominated for Best Telefilm in Anandalok Puraskar 2007)
2006	The Bong Connection	Apu	
2006	Dosar	Bobby	
2006	Aamra	Raj	
2007	Kailashey Kelenkari	Topshe	
2008	10:10	Himself	Guest appearance
2008	Chalo Let's Go	Sanjay	
2008	Tintorettor Jishu	Topshe	
2009	Brake Fail	Sidhu	
2009	Ek Bar Bolo Uttam Kumar	Kyabla	
2009	Box Number 1313	Joy	
2009	Kaalbela	Animesh	
2009	Kaler Rakhal	Shubal	
2010	Thana Theke Aschi	Arin	
2010	033	Som	
2011	Jaani Dyakha Hawbe	Megh	
2011	Baishe Srabon	Abhijeet	
2012	Bhooter Bhabishyat	Ayan Sengupta	
2012	Kahaani	Satyaki Sinha (Rana)	Hindi-language film
2012	Hemlock Society	Ananda Kar	
2012	Ekla Akash	Arijit	
2012	Balukabela.Com	Akash	
2012	Teen Yaari Katha	Antu	
2013	Basanta Utsav	PhD Student	
2013	Maach Mishti & More	Ronnie	
2013	Proloy	Barun Biswas	
2013	Apur Panchali	Subir Banerjee	
2014	Obhishopto Nighty	Aparesh Lahiri	
2014	Chaya Manush	Rahul	
2014	Gang of Ghosts	Director	Hindi-language film
2014	Balyakalasakhi		Malayalam-language
2014	Sold	Vikram	English-language film
2014	Highway	Ashmin Kapoor	
2014	Hercules	Horokailash (Haru)	
2014	Chotushkone	Joyobroto (Joy)	
2015	Yaara Silly Silly	Soumitro Roy/Sammy	Hindi-language film
2015	Glamour	Aryan	
2015	Roga Howar Sohoj Upaye	Joy	
2015	Kadambari	Rabindranath Tagore	
2016	Bastu Shaap	Kushal Mukherjee	
2016	Cinemawala	Prakash Das	
2016	Traffic	Abel	Hindi-language
2016	Hemanta	Hemanta Sen	
2016	Zulfiqar	Tony Braganza	
2016	Chocolate	Rana	
2017	Mi Amor		
2017	Bhuban Majhi	Nahir	Bangladeshi film
2017	Mandobasar Golpo	Dr. Sayantan Chowdhury (Psychiatrist)	
2017	Jawker Dhan	Bimal	
2017	Voyongkor Sundor	Muku	Bangladeshi film
2017	Anukul	Anukul	Hindi-language short film
2017	Samantaral	Sujan	
2018	Pari	Arnab	Hindi-language film
2018	Shonibar Bikel Saturday Afternoon		Indo-Bangladesh-German film
2018	Reunion		
2018	Homeland		Indian-French Film (Released on Netflix)
2019	Shahjahan Regency		
2019	Password	Ismailov	
2019	Shonibar Bikel	Polash	Bangladeshi-German-Russian Film
2019	Satyanweshi Byomkesh	Byomkesh Bakshi	
2019	Sagardwipey Jawker Dhan	Bimal	
2020	Sraboner Dhara	Dr. Neelabha Roy	
2020	Dwitiyo Purush	Abhijeet	
2020	Bulbbul	Dr. Sudip	Netflix Original Release
2020	Holud Boni	Palash	
2020	Balley Troupe		
2020	Senapati		
2020	Tiki-Taka	Raju	
2020	Switzerland		Special appearance
2021	Ramprasad Ki Tehrvi	Nishikant aka Neetu / Young Bauji	Hindi-language film
2021	Tangra Blues	Sanjib Mondal	
2021	Bony	Sabyasachi Mukherjee	
2021	Antardhaan	Anirban	
2022	Kaun Pravin Tambe?	Rajat Sanyal	Hindi-language film
2022	Abhijaan	Dr. Sanjoy Sen	
2022	Habji Gabji	Aditya Basu	
2022	Ajker Shortcut		
2022	Boudi Canteen	Sourish	
2022	Jotugriho		
2022	Mahisasuramarddini		
2023	Manobjomin		
2023	Doctor Bakshi		
2023	Ghore Pherar Gaan	Imran	
2023	Shibpur	Sultan Ahmed	
2023	Biye Bibhrat	Chandromouli Hazra	
2024	Ajob Karkhana	Rockstar Rajib	Bangladeshi film
2025	Shotyi Bole Shotyi Kichhu Nei	Satya	
2025	Ei Raat Tomar Amaar	Joy	
2025	Putulnacher Itikatha	Kumud	
2025	Killbill Society	Mrityunjoy Kar	
2025	Shreeman v/s Shreemati	Sourav	
2025	Sonar Kellay Jawker Dhan		
2025	Asukh Bisukh		
2025	Dhumketu		
2026	Abar Hawa Bodol	Jeet	
TBA	Headline		
TBA	Winkle Twinkle	Indra	
TBA	Notary		Hindi-language film
TBA	Chakda X'press		Hindi-language film

=== Web series ===
Year	Title	Director(s)	Role	Platform
2017	Feluda	Himself	Pradosh Chandra Mitra (Feluda)	Bioscope, Addatimes
2019	Sharate Aaj	Aritra Sen, Parambrata Chatterjee	Mahbub Ehsaan	ZEE5
2020	Case Jaundice	Subhankar Chattopadhyay	Mr. Sen	Hoichoi
2020	Black Widows	Birsa Dasgupta	Pankaj Mishra	ZEE5
2021	Aranyak	Vinay Waikul	Angad	Netflix
2022	Mithya	Rohan Sippy	Neil Adhikari	ZEE5
2022	Jugaadistan	Divya Rao	Bijoy Das	Lionsgate Play
2023	Jehanabad - Of Love & War	Rajeev Barnwal	Deepak Kumar	SonyLIV
2023	Shabash Feluda	Arindam Sil	Pradosh Chandra Mitra (Feluda)	ZEE5
2023	P I Meena	Debaloy Bhattacharya	Subho	Amazon Prime Video
2025	Khakee: The Bengal Chapter	Debatma Mondal and Tushar Kanti Ray	IPS Saptarshi Sinha	Netflix
2026	Choddobeshi	Aritra Sen	Aditya Majumdar, a private detective	Hoichoi
