= Killbill Society (soundtrack) =

2025 soundtrack album by Anupam Roy, Ranajoy Bhattacharjee and Tamalika Golder

Soundtrack album by Anupam Roy, Ranajoy Bhattacharjee and Tamalika Golder
- Released: 2025
- Recorded: 2024–2025
- Studios: Ananjan's Studio, Kolkata; Niyogi's Place, Kolkata
- Genre: Feature film soundtrack
- Length: 31:21
- Language: Bengali
- Label: SVF Music

Anupam Roy chronology
Bohurupi (2024)	Killbill Society (2025)	Aamar Boss (2025)

Ranajoy Bhattacharjee chronology
Omorshongi (2025)	Killbill Society (2025)	Ranna Baati (2025)

Tamalika Golder chronology
Durgo Rawhoshyo (2023)	Killbill Society (2025)	Lawho Gouranger Naam Rey (2025)

Killbill Society is the soundtrack album to the 2025 Indian Bengali-language black comedy romantic thriller film of the same name, directed by Srijit Mukherji. A spiritual successor and thematic spin-off of his 2012 cult classic Hemlock Society, the soundtrack is primarily composed by Anupam Roy, with additional compositions by Ranajoy Bhattacharjee and Tamalika Golder, and background score by Indraadip Dasgupta.

The album was released on 29 March 2025, under the SVF Music label. Lyrics were penned by Anupam and Ranajoy for their respective tracks, while Mukherji wrote the rest.

== Background and development ==
The musical identity of Killbill Society was developed as a direct response to the legacy of Hemlock Society (2012). While the genesis of the previous instalment focused on the "art of living" and the prevention of suicide, the 2025 film—inspired by an anecdote involving Angelina Jolie hiring a hitman for herself, revolves around the "commercial transaction of death." Srijit Mukherji adapted this "paid killing" concept, leading to the film's title—a play on the idea of people who "kill" and then "bill." This thematic shift necessitated a soundtrack that was more cynical, experimental, and aggressive than its predecessor.

A central narrative in the album's production was the high-profile reunion of Mukherji and Anupam Roy for the eleventh time after Autograph (2010), Baishe Srabon (2011), Hemlock Society (2012), Chotushkone (2014), Zulfiqar (2016), Uma (2018), Shah Jahan Regency (2019), Vinci Da (2019), Dwitiyo Purush (2020) and Dawshom Awbotaar (2023). Mukherji stated in an interview with The Telegraph that returning to this "universe" felt incomplete without Anupam's lyrical sensibilities. Unlike their previous collaborations, which often saw Anupam as the sole composer, Killbill Society used a multi-composer approach. Mukherji opted for a diverse palette, bringing in Tamalika Golder and Ranajoy Bhattacharjee, who previously worked with Mukherji on the web-series Durgo Rawhoshyo (2023) and the film Tekka (2024) respectively, whereas the former marked her debut in a feature-film.

== Musical structure ==
The soundtrack is characterized by a "layered" approach, where each song uses specific instruments to reflect a character's psychological state.

=== Acoustic and Melancholic Tracks ===
Anupam cited the songs "Nei Tumi Aager Moto" and "Shondhe Naamey" serving as the bridge to the respective tracks "Amar Mawte" and "Ekhon Onek Raat" from Hemlock Society. He added the tracks relied heavily on the Piano and the Cello, creating a sense of "urban loneliness." The use of the Acoustic guitar is deliberately sparse and muted compared to Anupam's earlier works, signifying a loss of innocence.

=== Traditional and Philosophical Tracks ===
"Shaatjawnmer Porichoy," composed by Ranajoy, used traditional Indian instruments to ground the film's existential themes, especially Shehnai and Esraj provide a haunting, classical backdrop that contrasted with the film's modern setting.

=== "Refereer Bnaashi": The Classical-Rock Fusion ===
The centerpiece of the album is "Refereer Bnaashi" (transl. The whistle of the referee), a high-octane duet of Rupam Islam and Sidhu, the two rock icons of Bengal, for the first time in the history of Bengali music. The song is a technical experiment in Classical-Rock Fusion:

==== Indian classical elements ====
The track opens with a complex Sarod and Sitar riff based on a dissonant variation of Raga Bhairavi. The "whistle" of the title is represented by high-pitched, staccato notes on a Flute.

==== Rock Elements ====
These classical motifs are overlaid with Double-bass drumming and High-gain distorted Electric Guitars.

==== Symbolism ====
The fusion of the "divine" sound of the Shehnai with the "aggressive" sound of heavy metal is intended to represent the clash between destiny (the Referee) and human rebellion (the Killbill agency).

== Release ==
The soundtrack preceded with eight singles: "Nei Tumi Aager Moto–Female" was the first track released on 19 March 2025, followed by "Bhalobeshey Basho Naa" on 25 March 2025, "Shondhe Naamey" on 29 March 2025, "Refereer Bnaashi" on 8 April 2025, "Shaatjawnmer Porichoy" on 20 April 2025, "Likhey Raakhi Prem" on 1 May 2025 and "Nei Tumi Aager Moto–Male" on 3 May 2025. The full album was released on 29 March 2025. The music launch event was held at India's tallest watch tower in Belilious Park, Howrah and the event was marked by performances from the music team in the film including Anupam Roy, Somlata Acharyya Chowdhury, Tamalika Golder, Ranajoy Bhattacharjee and Rapurna Bhattacharyya.

== Track listing ==
Track list
No.	Title	Lyrics	Music	Singer(s)	Length
1.	"Nei Tumi Aager Moto–Female"	Anupam Roy	Anupam Roy	Somlata Acharyya Chowdhury	5:12
2.	"Bhalobeshey Basho Naa"	Srijit Mukherji	Anupam Roy	Anupam Roy	4:28
3.	"Shondhe Naamey"	Anupam Roy	Anupam Roy	Anupam Roy	3:34
4.	"Refereer Bnaashi"	Srijit Mukherji	Tamalika Golder	Rupam Islam, Sidhu	4:58
5.	"Shaatjawnmer Porichoy–Film version"	Srijit Mukherji	Ranajoy Bhattacharjee	Durnibar Saha	5:27
6.	"Likhey Raakhi Prem"	Srimoy Bhattacharya	Tamalika Golder	Rapurna Bhattacharyya, Sudip Nandy	3:35
7.	"Shaatjawnmer Porichoy (Ft. Abhijeet Bhattacharya)"	Srijit Mukherji	Ranajoy Bhattacharjee	Abhijeet Bhattacharya	5:27
8.	"Nei Tumi Aager Moto–Male"	Anupam Roy	Anupam Roy	Anupam Roy	5:09
Total length:					31:21

== Personnel ==
Song	Personnel
"Nei Tumi Aager Moto"	Guitar: Ritaprabha Ray
"Bhalobeshey Basho Naa"	Guitar: Anupam Roy, Rishabh Ray; Bass guitar: Kaustav Biswas; Violin: Souptik Mazumder; Drums: Sandipan Parial
"Shondhe Naamey"	Guitar: Rishabh Ray; Saxophone: Gopal Das; Bass guitar: Kaustav Biswas; Drums: Sandipan Parial
"Refereer Bnaashi"	Sarod: Subhrajyoti Sen; Sitar: Purbayan Chatterjee; Electric Guitar: Pritish, Soumyadeep Das; Acoustic guitar: Pritish; Bass: Sunny Subhadeep Saha; Drums: Alloy Francis
"Shaatjawnmer Porichoy"	Shehnai: Yogesh More; Tabla: Joydeb Nandy
"Likhey Raakhi Prem"	Acoustic guitar: Pritish

=== Production ===
- Lead Composer: Anupam Roy
- Guest Composers: Ranajoy Bhattacharjee, Tamalika Golder
- Background Score: Indraadip Dasgupta
- Lyricists: Anupam Roy, Srijit Mukherji
- Music Arrangement: Nabarun Bose, Shamik Chakraborty
- Mixing & Mastering: Anindit Roy
- Label: SVF Music
