= Aritra Sen =

Indian filmmaker, screenwriter and producer

- Born: 3 December 1988 (age 37)
- Occupations: Filmmaker; Screenwriter; Producer
- Years active: 2016–present
- Organisation: Roadshow Films
- Spouse: Anwesha Das

Aritra Sen (pronounced [ɔritro sen]; born 3 December 1988) is an Indian film and web series director, screenwriter and producer who works in the Bengali film and entertainment industry.

Sen is one of the co-producers at Roadshow Films, a film and web series production company based in Kolkata. He became associated with the company on 28 November 2016. As a board member, he has produced Bhog, Ei Raat Tomar Amaar, Nikosh Chhaya, Biye Bibhrat and Boudi Canteen under the banner of Roadshow Films.

== Career ==
In 2019, he wrote the screenplay of the web series Kaali. It became ZEE5's first Bengali-language original web series. The same year, he directed the series Sharate Aaj and co-directed the short film Pori with Rohan Ghose. In 2020, he co-directed the mystery web series Damayanti with Rohan Ghose. In the same year, he also directed Kaali 2, the sequel to Kaali (2019). Besides, he wrote the screenplay for the Hindi-language web series Mafia. In 2021, Sen co-directed Nokol Heere with Rohan Ghose.

He had produced the documentary Swimming Through The Darkness directed by Supriyo Sen. It won the National Film Award for Best Exploration/Adventure Film at the 66th National Film Awards in 2019.

Sen made his feature film directorial debut with Ghore Pherar Gaan in 2023. The film premiered at the London Indian Film Festival on 2 July 2022 before its theatrical release in India in March 2023. In the same year, he also directed Shohorer Ushnotomo Din E, starring Vikram Chatterjee and Solanki Roy. In the subsequent years, he directed two web series for Addatimes — Julie (2025) and Byomkesh Bakshi (2026). In 2026 he directed the Hoichoi series Choddobeshi.

== Filmography ==
Key
†	Denotes films that have not yet been released

Year	Film	Director	Screenwriter	Story	Language	Notes	Ref.
2022	Boudi Canteen	No	No	Yes	Bengali		
2023	Ghore Pherar Gaan	Yes	Yes	Yes	Bengali	Marked his feature film directorial debut	
2023	Shohorer Ushnotomo Din E	Yes	Yes	Yes	Bengali		
TBA	Prantik †	Yes	Yes	Yes	Bengali		

== Web series ==
Year	Web series	Director	Writer	Story	OTT platform	Language	Notes	Ref.
2018	Kaali	No	Yes	Yes	ZEE5	Bengali	First Bengali-language Originals web series streamed on ZEE5	
2019	Sharate Aaj	Yes	No	No	ZEE5	Bengali		
2019	Bhalobashar Shohor	Yes	Yes	No	ZEE5	Bengali	Anthology film consisting of four short films; Sen co-directed the 2nd short film Pori with Rohan Ghose	
2020	Damayanti	Yes	No	No	Hoichoi	Bengali	Co-directed with Rohan Ghose; Based on Rohoshyo Shondhani Damayanti by Manoj Sen	
2020	Kaali 2	Yes	No	Yes	ZEE5	Bengali		
2020	Mafia	No	Yes	Yes	ZEE5	Hindi		
2021	Nokol Heere	Yes	No	No	Hoichoi	Bengali	Co-directed with Rohan Ghose; Based on Rohoshyo Shondhani Damayanti by Manoj Sen	
2025	Julie	Yes	No	Yes	Addatimes	Bengali		
2026	Byomkesh Bakshi	Yes	No	No	Addatimes	Bengali	Based on Saradindu Bandyopadhyay's stories Satyanweshi and Arthamanartham	
2026	Choddobeshi	Yes	No	No	Hoichoi	Bengali	Based on Abhirup Sarkar's novel Chowdhury Barir Rahashyo	

== Accolades ==
List of awards and nominations
Year	Award	Ceremony	Category	Film/Web series	Result	Ref.
2024	Filmfare Awards Bangla	7th Filmfare Awards Bangla	Best Debut Director	Ghore Pherar Gaan	Nominated	
2024	West Bengal Film Journalists' Association Awards	7th WBFJA Award	Most Promising Director	Shohorer Ushnotomo Din E	Won	
