= Raima Sen =

Indian actress

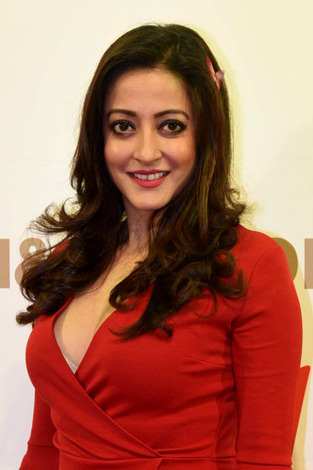
- Sen in 2017
- Born: Raima Dev Varma; 7 November 1979 (age 47); Bombay, Maharashtra, India
- Occupation: Actress
- Years active: 1999–present
- Mother: Moon Moon Sen
- Relatives: Riya Sen (sister); Suchitra Sen (maternal grandmother)

Raima Sen (Bengali pronunciation: [rai̯ma ʃen]; born Raima Dev Varma; 7 November 1979), is an Indian film actress who appears mainly in Bengali and Hindi movies. She is known for her roles in films like Chokher Bali, Parineeta, The Japanese Wife, and Baishe Srabon, earning praise for her natural performances.

== Early life ==
Sen was born on 7 November 1979 in Bombay (now Mumbai) to Moon Moon Sen and Bharat Dev Varma and the granddaughter of actress Suchitra Sen who is regarded as the Mahanayika of Bengali Cinema. Her sister Riya Sen is also in the Bollywood industry. Their father Bharat Dev Varma is a member of the royal family of Tripura. Her paternal grandmother, Ila Devi, was the princess of Cooch Behar, whose younger sister Gayatri Devi was the Maharani of Jaipur. Sen is also a descendant of the social reformer Keshab Chandra Sen through her paternal lineage; her ancestor Suniti Devi, the Maharani of Cooch Behar and daughter of Keshab Chandra Sen, was the mother of Jitendra Narayan, who was Sen's paternal great-grandfather. Her paternal great-grandmother Indira was the only daughter of Maharaja Sayajirao Gaekwad III of Baroda.

Sen's maternal great-grandfather Adinath Sen was a prominent Kolkata businessman, whose son Dinanath Sen – a relative of former Union Law Minister Ashoke Kumar Sen- was the Diwan or a Minister of the Maharaja of Tripura. The sisters are credited on-screen under their mother's maiden name, although their official papers carry the surname Dev Varma.

== Personal life ==
Sen is said to resemble her grandmother much more than either her mother or her sister. In an interview, she says while she enjoys Mumbai's faster pace of life, its gyms and its nightclubs, she misses her family in Kolkata, her dog Cuddles, and Kolkata's street food, notably Jhal Muri and Aloo chaat. Sen in 2006 said that she had a brief relationship with Odisha politician Kalikesh Narayan Singh Deo in 2006–2007.

== Career ==
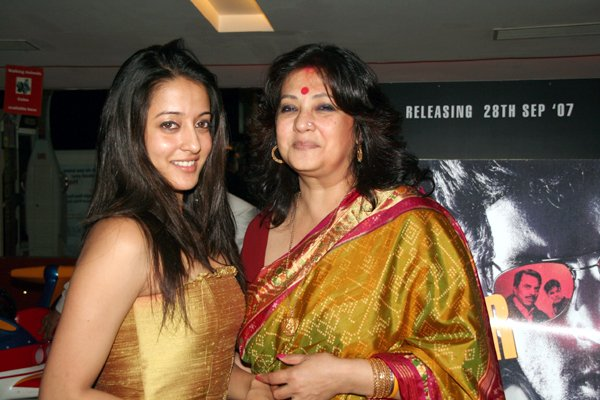
Sen with her mother Moon Moon Sen

Sen made her debut in the film Godmother, which was a critically acclaimed success, but her minor role may have been overlooked in favour of the protagonist, played by Shabana Azmi. She then starred in the film Daman playing Raveena Tandon's daughter, where her small performance was appreciated.

Her breakthrough role came when she starred in the Rituparno Ghosh's film Chokher Bali. After a few more average movies she had Parineeta in 2005, where she played the playmate of the film's heroine, played by the debutante Vidya Balan. Since then she has had two more hits with the action thriller Dus and the Bengali film Antar Mahal (where she had a very small role). In 2006, she appeared in the film The Bong Connection (co-starring Shayan Munshi). In 2007, she worked in the thriller Manorama Six Feet Under with Abhay Deol. In 2011, she starred in the hit Bengali film Baishe Srabon, opposite Parambrata Chatterjee.

2014 saw Sen as the leading lady in the critically acclaimed Hrid Majharey, the first Bengali movie based on the works of William Shakespeare, and presented as a tribute on the 450th year of birth of the Bard. She co-stars with Abir Chatterjee and Indrasish Roy in this dark love-story by debutant filmmaker Ranjan Ghosh. The film has earned a rare recommendation from the Film London in its list of world cinema based on the plays of Shakespeare. The film and its screenplay have also been included in the UGC Literature Archive. It is also famous for being the only other Bengali film after Sabuj Dweeper Raja (1979) to be shot in the Andaman and Nicobar Islands.

In 2016, she was seen in Bollywood Diaries, a film written and directed by K.D. Satyam. The film also stars Ashish Vidyarthi and Salim Diwan. In Amazon Prime's The Last Hour, released in 2020, Sen and Sanjay Kapoor played the main roles.

== Filmography ==
Key
Denotes films that have not yet been released

=== Film ===
Year	Title	Role	Language	Notes
1999	Godmother	Sejal	Hindi	Debut film
2001	Daman	Deepa Saikia	Hindi	
2002	Nil Nirjane	Ria	Bengali	
2002	Chokher Bali	Ashalata	Bengali	
2002	Fun2shh... Dudes in the 10th Century	Junali	Hindi	
2002	Kuch Dil Ne Kaha		Hindi	Songs album
2004	Shakti	Manasi	Bengali	
2005	Antar Mahal	Rukmini	Bengali	
2005	Dhairyam	Mallika	Telugu	
2005	Nishijapon	Sunita	Bengali	BFJA - Most Promising Actress Award
2005	Parineeta	Koel	Hindi	
2005	99.9 FM	Kim G. Singh	Hindi	
2005	Dus	Priya	Hindi	
2006	The Bong Connection	Sheela	Bengali	
2006	Anuranan	Preeti	Bengali	
2007	Eklavya: The Royal Guard	Princess Nandini	Hindi	
2007	Honeymoon Travels Pvt. Ltd.	Milly P. Sen	Hindi	
2007	Yatra		Hindi	
2007	Manorama Six Feet Under	Sheetal/Neetu	Hindi	
2007	Migration	Yamuna	Hindi	Short film
2008	Khela	Anjali	Bengali	
2008	Dhariya		Hindi	
2008	C Kkompany	Priya	Hindi	
2008	Mukhbiir	Roshni	Hindi	
2009	Mere Khwabon Mein Jo Aaye	Maya Singh	Hindi	
2009	Mumbai Cutting		Hindi	
2010	The Japanese Wife	Sandhya	Bengali	
2010	Memories in March	Sahana Chowdhury	English	Partly in Bengali & Hindi
2010	Teen Patti	Shivani Mukherjee	Hindi	
2010	Notobor Notout	Mistu	Bengali	
2010	Mirch	Maya/Manjula	Hindi	
2011	Noukadubi	Hemnalini	Bengali	Dubbed in Hindi as Kashmakash
2011	Baishe Srabon	Amrita Mukherji	Bengali	
2011	Veeraputhran	Kunhi Beevathu	Malayalam	
2012	Chitrangada: The Crowning Wish	Kasturi	Bengali	
2012	Abosheshey	Nandini	Bengali	
2012	Koyekti Meyer Golpo	Rini	Bengali	
2012	3 Bachelors	Neha	Hindi	
2013	Maach Mishti & More	Ishani	Bengali	Nominated, Filmfare Award for Best Actor Supporting Role (Female) – Bengali
2013	I, Me Aur Main	Beena Chandok	Hindi	
2013	Hawa Bodol	Tanuka/Tanu	Bengali	
2013	Shabdo	Tarukh's wife	Bengali	
2013	Ami Aar Amar Girlfriends	Preenita	Bengali	
2013	Ganesh Talkies	Shaban	Bengali	
2013	Sunglass		Bengali	
2014	Chaya Manush		Bengali	
2014	Children of War	Fida	Hindi	
2014	Baari Tar Bangla	Abanti	Bengali	
2014	Hrid Majharey	Debjani	Bengali	
2015	Abby Sen	Parama	Bengali	
2015	Kaagaz Ke Fools	Rubina	Hindi	
2015	Roga Howar Sohoj Upay		Bengali	
2015	89	Purba	Bengali	
2016	Bollywood Diaries	Imli	Hindi	
2016	Monchora	Nanda	Bengali	
2016	Bastu Shaap	Banya Dasgupta/Bony	Bengali	
2016	Khawto	Srijita /Sri	Bengali	
2017	ESP-Ekti Rohosso Golpo		Bengali	
2017	Hason Raja	Dilaram	Bengali	
2018	Vodka Diaries	Roshni Banerjee	Hindi	
2018	Reunion	Murari Mohan Rakshit	Bengali	
2019	Finally Bhalobasha	Malabika	Bengali	
2019	Sitara	Sitara	Bengali	
2020	Dwitiyo Purush	Amrita	Bengali	
2022	Anya	Divya	Hindi, Marathi	Bilingual film
2023	The Vaccine War	Rohini Singh Dhulla	Hindi	
2024	Bastar: The Naxal Story	Vanya Roy	Hindi	
2024	Aliya Basu Gayab Hai	Aliya Basu	Hindi	
2024	Chaalchitro: The Frame Fatale	Milli	Bengali	
2026	Phool Pishi O Edward	Aditi	Bengali	
2026	Abar Hawa Bodol	Tanuka	Bengali	
2026	Maa Kaali		Hindi	

=== Web series ===
Year	Title	Role	Platform	Notes
2017	Hello	Nandita	Hoichoi	
2018	Mehmaan	Aalo Chakraborty	ZEE5	
2019	Parchhayee	Julie	ZEE5	
2019	Love Bites		ZEE5	
2019	Eat Sleep Repeat	Sanjana	ZEE5	
2020	Black Widows	Innaya Thakur	ZEE5	
2020	Forbidden Love	Sudha	ZEE5	
2021	The Last Hour	Nyima	Amazon Prime	
2022	Mai: A Mother's Rage	Neelam	Netflix	
2023	Roktokorobi	Ranja	ZEE5	
2024	Kolonko	Chaiti	Hoichoi	
2024	Big Girls Don't Cry	Uma Ahuja	Prime Video	

== Awards and nominations ==
- 2006: BFJA-Most Promising Actress Award for Nishijapon
