= Chhal Kapat =

2025 Indian web series

- Promotional poster
- Genre: Mystery; Thriller
- Written by: Prakriti Mukherjee
- Screenplay by: Karishmaa Oluchi
- Directed by: Ajay Bhuyan
- Starring: Shriya Pilgaonkar; Kamya Ahlawat; Ragini Dwivedi; Tuhina Das; Yahhve Sharma; Pranay Pachauri; Smaran Sahu; Anuj Sachdeva; Keshav Lokwani
- Music by: Soutrik Chakraborty
- Country of origin: India
- Original language: Hindi
- No. of seasons: 1
- No. of episodes: 7

Production
- Producers: Aditya Pittie; Samar Khan
- Editor: Rajkumar Chaturvedi

Original release
- Network: ZEE5
- Release: 6 June 2025

Chhal Kapat: The Deception is a 2025 Indian Hindi-language mystery-thriller web series directed by Ajay Bhuyan and produced by Juggernaut Productions. The series is set around a wedding ceremony in Burhanpur, Madhya Pradesh, where a suspicious death prompts a police investigation. Shriya Pilgaonkar stars as SP Devika Rathore, the officer assigned to the case. The cast also includes Kamya Ahlawat, Ragini Dwivedi, Tuhina Das, Yahhve Sharma, Pranay Pachauri, Smaran Sahu, Anuj Sachdeva, and Keshav Lokwani. It is scheduled to premiere on 6 June 2025 on ZEE5.

== Plot ==
The story takes place in a village near Burhanpur, Madhya Pradesh, during a destination wedding. Alisha Dixit, the bride-to-be, reunites with her childhood friends Mehek, Ira, and Shalu. The celebrations are interrupted when Shalu, a social media influencer, is found dead under unclear circumstances.

SP Devika Rathore is assigned to lead the investigation. As she conducts inquiries, multiple individuals present at the wedding emerge as potential suspects. The investigation reveals past conflicts, hidden relationships, and unresolved issues among the guests.

== Cast and characters ==
- Shriya Pilgaonkar as SP Devika Rathore
- Kamya Ahlawat as Alisha Dixit
- Ragini Dwivedi as Mehek
- Tuhina Das as Ira
- Yahhve Sharma as Shalu
- Pranay Pachauri as Rohan
- Smaran Sahu as Jugal
- Anuj Sachdeva as Vikram
- Keshav Lokwani as Sapan

== Production ==
The series was directed by Ajay Bhuyan and produced by Aditya Pittie and Samar Khan under the banner of Juggernaut Productions. Filming took place in and around Burhanpur, Madhya Pradesh.

== Release ==
The trailer of the series was released on 4 June 2025. The series is scheduled to premiere on ZEE5 on 6 June 2025.

== Reception ==
Abhishek Srivastava of The Times of India gave 3 stars out of 5 and said that "Watch this if you're in the mood for a quick, no-frills murder mystery that sticks to the basics but keeps you guessing till the end." Mayur Sanap of Rediff.com rated 1.5/5 stars and said that "Chhal Kapat is a bland whodunnit, which does not have the necessary skills and smarts to pull it off". Sumit Rajguru of Times Now also gave 1.5 stars out of 5 and said that "the show fails to keep the audience hooked due to its poor execution".
