= Mafia (TV series) =

Indian web series

- Genre: Thriller
- Written by: Aniruddha Dasgupta; Rohan Ghose; Aritra Sen
- Directed by: Birsa Dasgupta
- Starring: Namit Das; Tanmay Dhanania; Saurabh Saraswat; Anindita Bose; Madhurima Roy; Aditya Bakshi; Riddhima Ghosh; Isha Saha
- Theme music composer: Nabarun Bose
- Country of origin: India
- Original language: Hindi
- No. of seasons: 1
- No. of episodes: 8

Production
- Producers: Himanshu Dhanuka; Ashok Dhanuka; Aritra Sen; Parambrata Chattopadhyay; Supriyo Sen; Rohan Ghose
- Production location: India
- Cinematography: Gairik Sarkar
- Editor: Sumit Chowdhury
- Production company: Eskay Movies

Original release
- Network: ZEE5

Mafia is an Indian streaming television series released in the year 2020 directed by Birsa Dasgupta.The series is written by Aniruddha Dasgupta, Rohan Ghose and Aritra Sen. Mafia revolves around the story of a group of friends trying to discover their past as those events have a resonance in their present. They discover the truth through heinous acts exercised by them in the past.

== Premise ==
Six friends and their partners embark on a bachelor party in the jungles of Madhupur. The group was inseparable during their college years, and Madhupur was their favorite weekend gig. But with time they grew apart. Betrayal, backstabbing and distrust led them on their separate ways.

Five years after their friendship was laid rest in the very place they return, each with a hidden agenda of their own. Centering on the popular parlor game ‘Mafia’, this is a gruesome psychological thriller that will keep its viewers on the edge. The aspects of the game spill out onto the life of its players and they are forced to confront and pay for their crimes.

== Cast ==
=== Main ===
- Namit Das as Nitin Kumar
- Tanmay Dhanania as Rishi
- Saurabh Saraswat as Ritwik
- Anindita Bose as Neha
- Madhurima Roy as Tania
- Aditya Bakshi as Sam
- Riddhima Ghosh as Priyanka
- Ishaa Saha as Ananya

== Production ==
=== Development ===
On June 23, 2020, ZEE5 announced that Birsa Dasgupta directed the series alongside Parambrata Chatterjee who produced it. Production companies involved with the series are Eskay Movies, Roadshow Films and EmVeeBee Media (P) Ltd. The series premiered on July 10, 2020. Birsa Dasgupta along with his associate Shaket banerjee, Dop Gairik Sarkar and production designer Riddhie Basak was set to start shoot from the beginning of the year 2020.

== Release ==
ZEE5 released the official trailer for the show on 27 June 2020 and it premiered on 10 July.

== Episodes ==
No. overall	No. in season	Title	Directed by	Written by	Original release date
1	1	"Reunion"	Birsa Dasgupta	Aniruddha Dasgupta, Rohan Ghose, Aritra Sen	10 July 2020
2	2	"Best Friends"	Birsa Dasgupta	Aniruddha Dasgupta, Rohan Ghose, Aritra Sen	10 July 2020
3	3	"The Stranger"	Birsa Dasgupta	Aniruddha Dasgupta, Rohan Ghose, Aritra Sen	10 July 2020
4	4	"Addiction"	Birsa Dasgupta	Aniruddha Dasgupta, Rohan Ghose, Aritra Sen	10 July 2020
5	5	"Robinhood"	Birsa Dasgupta	Aniruddha Dasgupta, Rohan Ghose, Aritra Sen	10 July 2020
6	6	"Lust"	Birsa Dasgupta	Aniruddha Dasgupta, Rohan Ghose, Aritra Sen	10 July 2020
7	7	"Split"	Birsa Dasgupta	Aniruddha Dasgupta, Rohan Ghose, Aritra Sen	10 July 2020
8	8	"Vendetta"	Birsa Dasgupta	Aniruddha Dasgupta, Rohan Ghose, Aritra Sen	10 July 2020

== Critical reception ==
Mafia received mixed reviews from critics. Gripping narrative and thrilling plot shifts of the series were highlighted and appreciated.

The Indian Express explained that the series offered unlimited thrill that would always keep you at the edge of your seat.

Shikha Desai from Times Of India rated the series 3 out of 5 stars and wrote Its the plot which makes the series watchable however she had qualms with the execution for which she stated could have been better. Pratishruti Ganguly from Firstpost stated the execution of series as confusing, and wrote that the series shows glimmers of excellent plot but the conclusion disappoints. The show has 6.6 rating on IMDB based on 2.3K ratings and 325 user reviews.
