= Ahalya (disambiguation) =

Ahalya in Hinduism is the wife of the sage Gautama Maharishi.

Ahalya may also refer to:

- Ahalya (TV series), a Tamil soap opera, 2004–2006
- Ahalya (1978 film), an Indian Malayalam film directed Babu Nanthankode
- Ahalya (2015 film), a Bengali short film directed by Sujoy Ghosh

== See also ==
- Ahilyabai Holkar
