= Anjali Sharma =

Anjali Sharma may refer to:

- Anjali Sharma (cricketer)
- Anjali Sharma (climate activist)
- Anjali Sharma (actress)
