= Abar Hawa Bodol =

2026 Indian Bengali film

- Theatrical release poster
- Directed by: Parambrata Chattopadhyay
- Screenplay by: Pavel
- Story by: Pavel
- Produced by: Ashok Dhanuka; Himanshu Dhanuka
- Starring: Parambrata Chattopadhyay; Rudranil Ghosh; Raima Sen; Anusha Viswanathan
- Cinematography: Prosenjit Chowdhury
- Edited by: Sumit
- Music by: Indraadip Dasgupta
- Production company: Eskay Movies
- Distributed by: Eskay Movies
- Release date: 12 June 2026
- Running time: 139 minutes
- Country: India
- Language: Bengali

Abar Hawa Bodol (transl. The Winds Change Again) is a 2026 Indian Bengali comedy film directed by Parambrata Chattopadhyay. Written by Pavel, the film is a sequel to Hawa Bodol (2013). Produced by Ashok Dhanuka and Himanshu Dhanuka under the banner of Eskay Movies, the film stars Parambrata Chattopadhyay, Rudranil Ghosh, Raima Sen and Anusha Viswanathan in the lead roles.

The film is about two childhood friends whose contrasting lives intersect again more than a decade after the events of the first film. Principal photography took place in London. Indraadip Dasgupta has composed the music of the film. Prosenjit Chowdhury did the cinematography while Sumit handled the editing. The film was released in the theatres on 12 June 2026, to mixed reviews from the critics.

== Synopsis ==
More than a decade after the events of Hawa Bodol, Jeet is living in London, where his marriage has broken down and his life is no longer on track. Meanwhile, Raj has become a successful rockstar with a growing fan base. When the two friends meet again after several years, they find themselves caught up in another body-swapping incident. The film follows how they deal with the situation and its effect on their personal and professional lives.

== Cast ==
- Parambrata Chatterjee as Satrajit a.k.a. Jeet, an NRI
- Rudranil Ghosh as Rajarshi a.k.a. Raj, a successful rockstar
- Raima Sen as Tanuka, Jeet's wife
- Anusha Viswanathan as Kajallata, a punk rockstar and Raj's partner
- Kabir Bhattacharya as Tejo, Jeet and Tanuka's son
- Chanchal Ghosh as Jayanta, Raj's manager

Cameo

- Aritra Sen as Osman Bhai

== Production ==
Abar Hawa Bodol was announced by Eskay Movies on 11 November 2024. Parambrata Chattopadhyay revealed in an interview that development of this film was delayed for several years since the original creative team of Hawa Bodol had relocated abroad. The project was revived after discussions with Rudranil Ghosh in 2019, after which Eskay Movies commissioned the film.

The film is set thirteen years after the events of the first film. Parambrata Chatterjee, Rudranil Ghosh and Raima Sen reprised their roles from the first part. Anusha Viswanathan was cast in a pivotal role. Pavel was roped in to write the screenplay. This marked his second collaboration with Parambrata Chattopadhyay after Shonar Pahar (2018).

== Soundtrack ==
Abar Hawa Bodol

Soundtrack album by Indraadip Dasgupta
- Released: 2026
- Genre: Film soundtrack
- Length: 17:19
- Language: Bengali
- Label: Eskay Music

Indraadip Dasgupta has composed the music of the film. The lyrics have been penned by Barish.

The first single "E Jibon" was released on 15 May 2026. The second song "Dekhas Naa Bhoy Please" was dropped on 23 May 2026. The third and final song of the album "Swapno Dekhar Din Aaj" was released on 7 June 2026.

Track listing
No.	Title	Singer(s)	Length
1.	"E Jibon"	Javed Ali	6:26
2.	"Dekhas Naa Bhoy Please"	Javed Ali, Somlata Acharyya Chowdhury	6:42
3.	"Swapno Dekhar Din Aaj"	Aarvan	4:11
Total length:			17:19

== Marketing ==
The teaser of Abar Hawa Bodol was released on 5 May 2026. The trailer of the film was revealed on 30 May 2026. It was premiered on the same day PVR INOX in South City Mall, Kolkata. The premiere was attended by eminent personalities from the Bengali film industry.

As part of the film's promotional campaign, Bisleri International released a series of limited-edition water bottles featuring Parambrata Chattopadhyay and branding from Abar Hawa Bodol. The bottles were made available across West Bengal in 250 ml, 500 ml and 1 litre variants.

== Release ==
The film had been completed by 2023–24 and was initially considered for a Durga Puja 2025 release, but its release was postponed due to a crowded festive release schedule. The film was subsequently released in the theatres on 12 June 2026.

== Reception ==
=== Critical reception ===
Udisha of the Indulge Express reviewed the film and wrote "Sequels have a tendency to disappoint but Abar Hawa Bodol passed the test. Despite the long gap, it came back with nuance and finesse and will leave fans wanting more." She praised the direction, the balance between funny moments and emotional scenes, the witty comedy, the attention holding storyline and the performances of the cast but bemoaned the story for being predictable at certain points.

Poorna Banerjee of The Times of India rated the film 3/5 stars and wrote "Despite its flaws, the mix of humour and genuine emotional drama makes it an engaging, intriguing work. " She applauded the suggestive humor, performance of the actors, the direction, music and the physical comedy. Moon Moon Sen reviewed the film for Anandabazar Patrika and appreciated the direction, the script and the performance of whole cast, particularly Anusha and Rudranil.

Shampali Moulik of Sangbad Pratidin reviewed the film and wrote "The strength of the film is the acting. Although the sky of London is cloudy at times in the script, the on-screen chemistry between Rudranil and Parambrata is sunny." She applauded the performance of the whole cast; particularly Rudranil and Anusha but criticized the film for being predictable in certain scenes, Chanchal Ghosh's overacting, below par cinematography, poor quality songs, the excessive length and the stretched ending.

Aratrika Dey of Ei Samay reviewed the film and opined "Abar Hawa Badal is not just a sequel, but a story of friendship, relationships and finding yourself anew." She praised Parambrata and Rudranil's performance, their chemistry, Rudranil's comic timing, the direction and the cinematography but bemoaned the slow second half and certain stretched sequences.

Subhankar Chakraborty of The Wall reviewed the film and highlighted "This film is not a fantasy-comedy mix. It is a story of growing up. A story of admitting mistakes. A story of getting back up even after being defeated by life." He applauded the direction, the restrained humour, attention to details, the performance of the actors, the chemistry between Raj and Jeet, Raima's dialogue delivery, the cinematography, the music and the dialogues written by Pavel but bemoaned the predictable plot twists and the poorly made aristocratic sophistication of Raj's neighbourhood.
