= Ghawre Bairey Aaj =

2019 Bengali films

- Poster
- Directed by: Aparna Sen
- Based on: Ghaire Baire by Rabindranath Tagore
- Produced by: Shree Venkatesh Films
- Starring: Jisshu Sengupta; Anirban Bhattacharya; Tuhina Das
- Cinematography: Soumik Haldar
- Edited by: Rabiranjan Maitra
- Music by: Neel Dutt
- Production company: Shree Venkatesh Films
- Release dates: 18 July 2019 (Premiere JFF); 15 November 2019 (India)
- Country: India
- Language: Bengali

Ghawre Bairey Aaj is a Bengali political drama film directed by Aparna Sen. The film starring Jisshu Sengupta, Anirban Bhattacharya and Anjan Dutt, was released on 15 November 2019 under the banner of Shree Venkatesh Films. It is the modern retelling of Ghare Bairey, 1916 classic novel of Rabindranath Tagore.

Ghawre Bairey Aaj is the story of three protagonists, one of which is loosely based on slain journalist Gauri Lankesh. It was world premiered in 10th edition of Jagran Film Festival in Delhi on 18 July 2019, under the Indian Panorama category.

== Plot ==
It is a complex triangular love story of a Hindu nationalist professor, young Dalit girl and her liberal editor husband. The film is set on the present political turbulence in country. Sandip, an active politician was a childhood friend, Nikhilesh. Nikhilesh, the editor lives with his wife Brinda. After a long time Sandip comes to meet them which causes a serious change of relationship perceptions and increases complexities between husband and wife.

== Cast ==
- Jisshu Sengupta as Sandip Jha
- Anirban Bhattacharya as Nikhilesh
- Tuhina Das as Brinda
- Anjan Dutt
- Rwitobroto Mukherjee as Amulyo Dutta
- Sreenanda Shankar

== Soundtrack ==
Track listing
No.	Title	Singer	Length
1.	"Chhaye Badra"	Ustaad Rashid Khan, Arpita Chatterjee	2:06
2.	"Bhora Badar"	Manomay Bhattacharya	3:38

== Release ==
It had its world premiered in 10th edition of Jagran Film Festival in Delhi on 18 July 2019, under the Indian Panorama category.
