= Tuhina Das =

Bengali actress

- Born: 11 March 1992 (age 34); Contai, West Bengal, India
- Occupations: Actress; Model
- Years active: 2018–present

Tuhina Das is an Indian Bengali model and actress.

== Career ==
Das grew up in a middle class family of Contai and moved to Kolkata to study fashion. Once in Kolkata, she became active in the theatre scene, and has since pursued an acting career. Her breakthrough movie was Gharey Bairey Aaj by Aparna Sen, for which she won the West Bengal Film Journalists' Association's Most Promising Actress award. Das got a breakthrough for her title role in Bengali web series Damayanti. Since then, she has appeared in several feature films and web series, making her Hindi-language debut in 2021. In 2026, she appeared as 'Laila' in Hindi crime-comedy web series Clean Up Company on Amazon MX Player alongwith Ravi Kishan and Vishal Jethwa.

== Filmography ==
Year	Film/TV series	Role	Notes	Ref.
2018	Aschhe Abar Shabor	Uma	Debut film	
2019	Ghawre Bairey Aaj	Brinda		
2020	Sin Sister	Tanushree	Hoichoi film	
2020	Damayanti	Damayanti Dutta Gupta	Hoichoi series	
2020	Break Up Story		Hoichoi series	
2020	Hai Taubba		ALTBalaji series	
2022	Abhijaan	Waheeda Rehman		
2022	Aparajitaa			
2022	Rawkto Bilaap		Hoichoi series	
2025	Chhal Kapat	Ira	ZEE5 series	
2025	Single Papa	Saoni Ghosh	Netflix series	
2026	Clean Up Company	Laila	MX Original series	
