= Anindya Bose =

Indian Bengali singer composer lyricist

Anindya Bose is a Bengali singer composer lyricist. He is one of the popular Bengali singer based out of Kolkata. He is also famous as a music composer and a scriptwriter of Bengali films. Anindya Bose is also an activist who took part in different social activity. He was one of the major face of #hokkolorob.

== Parash Pathar ==
After Auyon Banerjee came along and joined Jadavpur University, in his first year, the scenario changed. Anindyo was a known face in the campus owing to his 6 years being a student and stage performances wherein he sang popular songs of Kishore Kumar. Auyon's width of spectrum in listening varied from Salil Choudhury, Sudhin Dasgupta, Hemanta, Biswas, Jasimuddin and a lot of songs for the mass. Auyon hailed from St. Xavier's Collegiate School, where, he fell in love with The Beatles, Dylan, Simon and Garfunkel, U2, PinkFloyd, Deep purple, Jethro Tull alongside all the Legendary greats of Rock. It was Auyon's drive to form a band who would only compose original numbers in Bengali played in a backdrop of Rock arrangements. He approached, Kingshuk Chakraborty (Piqloo), a natural percussionist, and Anindyo Bose. That was a half-formed band. St. Xavier's provided the rest. Anirban Sengupta (potla), Promit (keys), Doi (bass) and Amartya Bobo Rauth (guitars) joined in. They had an act called Prakriti where they performed cover versions of classic rock songs. They went on to win the Wildfire, the rock band competition at Springfest IIT KGP. This combo was the first Parashpathar line up. It was here where Bangla rock music got its first new sound. the Bangla Band movement thus began. He was one of the two singers and both Auyon and him wrote and composed most of the songs. Songs such as Bhalobasa mane archies Gallery, Bondhu, Sujon and Ek Jhank Ichhe DanaPadma', 'Prohori','Megher Bou' were great hits. The permanent members of the band were Raja Narayan Deb-keys, Samidh Mukerjee-Bass, Rishi Chanda-guitars, Humtoo the flautist, Sanjoy on drums. It was the most popular form of music in Bengal. A "phenomenon"as many recalled. The fire caught on in a snap. Young boys and girls took to guitar and composing their own songs. Many a youth identified with parashpathar. It was viral. New songs, songwriters, musicians emerged. Good new compositions filled up the air all around. Anindyo, unfortunately, did not get to taste this wave of passion for something all these talented musicians would die for. It was a turn, turn, turn. The musicscape of Bengal underwent a change for the better. A revolution was brewing. rock band of West Bengal.

=== Present ===
After leaving the band due to disagreement on the equal payment for all issues, he formed a shadow, another band Bangla band called "Shahar" in 1998. He is the lead vocalist of the band. The other notable members of the band was Debasish Roy (Debu), Kishore Goswami and Tirthankar Bannerjee. His shows included around 70% of his songs and 30% of parashpathar majorly written, composed and sung by him.

He is also famous as a music composer and a screenwriter of Bengali films. His list of films includes "Hawa bodol", "Teen Yaari Katha", "Chirodini Tumi Je Amar 2" etc. . He is currently directing his first film.
