= Chaya Manush =

2014 Indian Bengali film

- Poster
- Directed by: Arindam Mamdo Dey
- Screenplay by: Arijit Biswas
- Produced by: Pankaj Agarwal
- Starring: Parambrata Chatterjee; Raima Sen
- Cinematography: Shrisha Ray
- Edited by: Bodhaditya Banerjee
- Music by: Anupam Roy
- Production company: PB Films Ltd.
- Release date: 7 February 2014
- Country: India
- Language: Bengali

Chaya Manush (transl. Shadow Human) is a 2014 Indian Bengali para-psychological thriller film directed by Arindam Mamdo Dey. Produced by Pankaj Agarwal under the banner of PB Films Limited, the film stars Parambrata Chatterjee and Raima Sen in the lead roles.

== Plot ==
Rahul, once a popular author, is suffering from writer's block. His wife and son leave him. Drowned in debt, he is frustrated and angry with himself. His only friend is Trisha, a journalist, who he can fall back on in times of need. One day, Rahul accidentally meets his old friend Arko, who is now a film producer with pots of money. Arko invites him over for a drink and requests Rahul to listen to his life story. Rahul, reluctantly, decides to hear him out. There, he has a strange encounter with Pranotosh Dayal Dinobondhu, who apparently knows everything about their lives. Arko calls Dayal evil and warns Rahul not to fall into his trap.

== Cast ==
- Parambrata Chattopadhyay
- Soumitra Chatterjee
- Raima Sen
- Paoli Dam
- Kaushik Ganguly
- Debdoot Ghosh
