= Ghore Pherar Gaan =

2023 Indian Bengali language drama film

- Announcement poster
- Directed by: Aritra Sen
- Written by: Aritra Sen
- Produced by: Ashok Dhanuka; Himanshu Dhanuka
- Starring: Ishaa Saha; Parambrata Chatterjee; Gourab Chatterjee
- Cinematography: Tuban
- Edited by: Sumit Chowdhury
- Music by: Prabuddha Banerjee
- Production company: Sevenseas Productions
- Distributed by: Eskay Movies
- Release date: 17 March 2023
- Running time: 140 minutes
- Country: India
- Language: Bengali

Ghore Pherar Gaan is a 2023 Indian Bengali language drama film written and directed by Aritra Sen. The film was produced by Sevenseas Productions and released on 17 March 2023 under the banner of Eskay Movies. The music was composed by Prabuddha Banerjee. The film stars Ishaa Saha, Parambrata Chatterjee and Gourab Chatterjee in the lead roles.

== Plot ==
Since childhood, Tora had chosen music as her profession. Tora used to be the vocalist for a band whilst living in Kolkata. There, she was in a relationship with a guy named Soham. But he cheated on Tora and ran away. Afterwards, her parents married Tora off to a Bengali expatriate — a doctor, named Rivu. His mother, Shanta, is a little different and Tora is afraid of her. But Rivu takes care of his wife. Tora comes abroad and starts to feel very alone. One day, she meets an Indian boy named Imran and they gradually fall in love. However, their affair gets known to Rivu and his mother. After a few days, Tora leaves Rivu's house. But Imran returns to India as his father dies. On the other hand, Tora finds out that she is expecting. She reveals to Rivu that the child belongs to Imran and not him. Disappointed and frustrated by Tora's actions, her parents cut off all ties with her.

Tora decides to conceal the truth of her pregnancy from Imran only to make him a little stress free. Tora decides to wait in silence and meet Imran only if destiny wants.

== Cast ==
- Ishaa Saha as Tora
- Parambrata Chatterjee as Imran
- Gourab Chatterjee as Ribhu
- Avery Singha Roy as Imran's sister
- Chaitali Dasgupta as Imran's mother
- Reshmi Sen as Ribhu's mother
- Jhon McHale as Professor Levy
- Anna Maria Renz as Heather
- Abhishek Mukherjee as Family Friend & Doctor

== Soundtrack ==
The music of the film has been composed by Prabuddha Banerjee. Three songs have been adapted from Rabindra Sangeets by Rabindranath Tagore.

Timir Biswas and Samadipta Mukherjee have been the key vocalists for most of the songs in male and female voice respectively.

Track listing
No.	Title	Lyrics	Music	Singer(s)	Length
1.	"Basanta Batase"	Baul Abdul Karim Shah	Baul Abdul Karim Shah, Prabuddha Banerjee	Timir Biswas	3:15
2.	"Ghore Pherar Gaan (Title Track)"	Anindya Chattopadhyay	Prabuddha Banerjee	Timir Biswas, Samadipta Mukherjee	3:19
3.	"Elem Notun Deshe"	Rabindranath Tagore	Rabindranath Tagore	Samadipta Mukherjee	2:04
4.	"Amrito Megher Bari"	Lalon Fakir	Lalon Fakir, Prabuddha Banerjee	Timir Biswas, Samadipta Mukherjee	4:03
5.	"Krishno Aila Radhar Kunje"	Arkum Shah	Arkum Shah, Prabuddha Banerjee	Bonnie Chakraborty, Nabarun Bose	2:33
6.	"Akash Amay Bhorlo Aloy"	Rabindranath Tagore	Rabindranath Tagore	Samadipta Mukherjee, Timir Biswas	3:54
7.	"Purano Sei Diner Kotha"	Rabindranath Tagore	Rabindranath Tagore	Samadipta Mukherjee, Timir Biswas	2:44
8.	"Asamajik"	Timir Biswas	Prabuddha Banerjee	Timir Biswas	3:19
9.	"Kajol Bhromora-Khachar Pakhi Medley"	Timir Biswas	Prabuddha Banerjee	Timir Biswas	4:00
Total length:					29:11
