= Boudi Canteen =

2022 Indian Bengali film

- Theatrical release poster
- Directed by: Parambrata Chattopadhyay
- Screenplay by: Samragnee Banerjee, Soumyashree Ghosh
- Story by: Aritra Sen
- Dialogues: Samragnee Banerjee
- Produced by: Aritra Sen, Tonmoy Banerjee
- Starring: Subhashree Ganguly; Parambrata Chattopadhyay; Anashua Majumdar; Soham Chakraborty
- Cinematography: Tiyash Sen
- Edited by: Sumit Chowdhury
- Music by: Joy Sarkar
- Production companies: Roadshow Films; RT Network Solutions; Shadow Film Productions
- Release date: September 9, 2022
- Running time: 117 minutes
- Country: India
- Language: Bengali

Boudi Canteen is a 2022 Indian Bengali slice of life film directed by Parambrata Chattopadhyay. It has been produced by Aritra Sen and Tonmoy Banerjee under the banner of Roadshow Films. The story has been conceived by Aritra Sen, and the screenplay has been written by Samragnee Banerjee and Soumyashree Ghosh.

The film stars Subhashree Ganguly in the lead role, while Parambrata Chattopadhyay, Anashua Majumdar and Soham Chakraborty play other pivotal roles. Joy Sarkar has composed the music of the film. Tiyash Sen did the cinematography while Sumit Chowdhury handled the editing. The film was released on 30 September 2022.

== Synopsis ==
Poulami is a schoolteacher and she loves cooking. With the help of Sourish, her husband, and Bablu, a food delivery service owner, she starts a cooking business. But she faces opposition from her mother-in-law, who wants her to pursue her teaching job instead of working in the kitchen.

== Cast ==
- Subhashree Ganguly as Poulami, a teacher turned chef-owner
- Parambrata Chattopadhyay as Sourish, a columnist and Poulami's husband
- Anashua Majumdar as Surabhi, Poulami's mother-in-law
- Soham Chakraborty as Bablu, a food deliverer
- Arun Banerjee
- Pushan Dasgupta
- Pinaki Majumder
- Sumit Dutta
- Abhijit Guha
- Avery Singha Roy
- Debanjan Mitra

== Production ==
=== Announcement and development ===
The first looks of the characters played by Soham Chakraborty and Anashua Majumdar in the film were released in the first two weeks of April. Subhashree Ganguly's first look from the film was released on 22 April 2022.

The first poster of the film was released on 12 June 2022. Besides Subhashree, it featured Parambrata, Anashua and Soham. The poster revealed the film's release to be slated for Durga Puja 2022.

=== Casting ===
Director Parambrata Chattopadhyay cast Subhasree Ganguly in the lead role. He cast himself in the role of Subhasree's character's husband. In an interview, Subhasree said that she agreed to the film owing to its storyline, which depicts that woman empowerment doesn't mean that women have to do the jobs conventionally done by men; women can be empowered through jobs like cooking, which are traditionally associated with women.

=== Filming ===
Principal photography started on 20 May 2022 and was completed within a short schedule of one month. Filming took place across different locations in Kolkata. The filming was completed on 20 June 2022.

== Soundtrack ==
Boudi Canteen

Soundtrack album by Joy Sarkar
- Released: 25 January 2023
- Studio: Studio Vibrations
- Genre: Film soundtrack
- Length: 13:07
- Language: Bengali
- Label: Zee Music Bangla
External audio
- Boudi Canteen - Audio Jukebox on YouTube

The music of the film has been composed by Joy Sarkar. The lyrics have been penned by Dipangshu Acharya and Srijato.

The first song "Tiring Biring" was released on 16 September 2022. The second single "Olpo Anchein" was dropped on 20 September 2022. The third single "Ekla Hote Hote" was released on 21 September 2022.

Track listing
No.	Title	Lyrics	Singer(s)	Length
1.	"Tiring Biring"	Dipangshu Acharya	Iman Chakraborty, Arkadeep Mishra	3:40
2.	"Olpo Anchein"	Srijato	Ishan Mitra	3:46
3.	"Ekla Hote Hote"	Srijato	Madhubanti Bagchi	4:41
Total length:				13:07

== Marketing ==
The teaser for Boudi Canteen was released on 27 August 2022. The trailer for the film was released on 6 September 2022. The trailer was launched at an event held at a restaurant in Kolkata. The film was premiered at Cinepolis in the Acropolis Mall in Kolkata.

== Release ==
The film was released in the theatres on 30 September 2022, coinciding with the occasion of Durga Puja.

=== Home media ===
Boudi Canteen had its OTT premiere on ZEE5 on 10 March 2023. The film had its television premiere on 30 April 2023 on Zee Bangla Cinema.

== Review ==
=== Critical review ===
Shamayita Chakraborty of OTTplay rated the film 3.5/5 stars and worded it as a "feel-good film." She appreciated the positivity throughout the film, the performance of the principal cast, the cinematography in the reconciliation sequence, the usage of progressive outlooks and the music but criticized the underexplored crises faced by Poulami, the impractically quick resolution of the rift between Poulami and Sourish, not-so-thoughtful presentation of the professional setbacks faced by Sourish and the style of writing that makes the film lean towards becoming a television series.

Ujjainee Roy of The Times of India rated the film 4/5 stars and praised the simplicity in the storyline and the performance of the actors but bemoaned the excessive social messaging. Bidisha Chatterjee of Sangbad Pratidin reviewed the film and praised the performance of actors, it's unconventional script, the reconciliation sequence between Poulami and Sourish, the multiple questions raised by the film and its unique way of defining women empowerment and freedom. But she bemoaned the weak direction and the lack of a job-going female character who opposes the traditional idea of women in kitchen.

Pritha Biswas of Anandabazar Patrika reviewed the film and applauded the screenplay which has included more than a dozen social issues, the execution, the production, the display of the tussle between the ancient and the contemporary, the simple dialogues, the performance of the actors, the blurring of the line between the conventional roles assigned by the society to different genders and the music. But she bemoaned the presence of excessive advertisements in between the film.
