= Bony (film) =

2021 Indian Bengali sci-fi thriller film

- Official release poster
- Directed by: Parambrata Chatterjee
- Written by: Parambrata Chatterjee & Aniruddha Dasgupta
- Based on: Bony by Shirshendu Mukhopadhyay
- Produced by: Nishpal Singh
- Starring: Parambrata Chatterjee; Koel Mallick; Anjan Dutt; Kanchan Mallick
- Cinematography: Tiyash Sen
- Edited by: Sumit Chowdhury
- Music by: Nabarun Bose Anupam Roy
- Production company: Surinder Films
- Distributed by: Surinder Films
- Release date: 10 October 2021
- Country: India
- Language: Bengali

Bony is a 2021 Indian Bengali-language science fiction action thriller film directed by Parambrata Chatterjee, starring Koel Mullick, Anjan Dutt, and Chatterjee. The film is a screen adaptation of the eponymous novel written by Bengali novelist Shirshendu Mukhopadhyay and is produced by Nishpal Singh under the banner of Surinder Films. The film was shot in Tuscany, Italy.

== Synopsis ==
The story of the film revolves around a Bengali couple, settled in Milan. Their newborn son Bony has some special powers. An American-born Bangladeshi on the run scientist, framed by the government with suspected links to terrorism, is looking for the couple and their newborn. He thinks they have answers to his questions.

== Cast ==
- Parambrata Chatterjee as Bony's father, Sabyasachi
- Koel Mallick as Bony's mother, Pratibha
- Anjan Dutt as Saukat Osman, a scientist
- Kanchan Mallick as Rammohan
- Marco Brinzi as Spia italiana
- Zachary Coffin as Petrov
- Giada Benedetti as Doctor
- Deepak Halder

== Soundtrack ==
Track listing
No.	Title	Singer(s)	Length
1.	"Lucky"	Anupam Roy	3:05
2.	"Mohona"	Paloma Majumder	3:26

== Release ==
The film released theatrically on 10 October 2021 coinciding the Puja holidays.
