= Biye Bibhrat =

- Directed by: Raja Chanda
- Screenplay by: Soumyasree Ghosh; Akash Chakraborty
- Story by: Parambrata Chattopadhyay
- Produced by: Parambrata Chattopadhyay; Aritra Sen
- Starring: Parambrata Chattopadhyay; Abir Chatterjee; Lahoma Bhattacharjee; Sudipa Basu
- Cinematography: Basudeb Chakraborty
- Edited by: Sumit Chowdhury
- Music by: Ranajoy Bhattacharjee
- Production companies: Shadow Films; Roadshow Films; RT Entertainment
- Release date: 14 July 2023
- Running time: 118 minutes
- Country: India
- Language: Bengali

Biye Bibhrat (transl. Marriage Confusion) is a 2023 Indian Bengali-language romantic comedy drama film written by Parambrata Chattopadhyay and directed by Raja Chanda. The film was produced by Shadow Films and Roadshow Films. The film stars Parambrata Chattopadhyay, Abir Chatterjee and Lahoma Bhattacharya in the lead roles.

The movie premiered in theaters on 14 July 2023, and was released on ZEE5 OTT platform on 1 September 2023.

== Plot ==
Shakyajit Som and Mohor play the lead characters in the first half of the story. Shakyajit is an investment banker by profession. Additionally, he creates his own music videos and has become a YouTube sensation. Although he writes six songs for Niki, he refuses to make any commitment beyond friendship. He is reluctant about marriage. However, his mother is constantly trying to get him married. After constant nagging from his mother, he unwillingly agrees to an arranged marriage. After meeting several brides, he becomes attracted to Mohor, an interior designer, which opens a new avenue in his life.

During the meetings, both Mohor and her father are impressed by his singing. Their marriage is fixed. However, in the midst of marriage preparations, things take a turn when Shakya receives a strange anonymous letter. The letter accuses Mohor of being promiscuous and of using dark magic. He shows the letter to Mohor and learns that it's from her ex-boyfriend, Chandromouli Hazra. Shakya, feeling desperate and worried, goes to Chandromouli to clear his doubts regarding his bride-to-be.

A series of events then occur that showcase the bromance between Shakya and Chandromouli, as well as the complexities surrounding marriage. The story follows how they work together to find a solution and resolve their problems.

== Cast ==
- Parambrata Chattopadhyay as Chandromouli Hazra
- Abir Chatterjee as Shakyajit Shome
- Lahoma Bhattacharjee as Mohor Mukherjee
- Sudipa Basu as Shakyajit's mother
- Rohit Mukherjee as Mohor's father
- Anjana Mukherjee
- Swastika Dutta as Nikita, Shakyajit's ex-girlfriend
- Sreya Dutta
- Riya Roy
- Ankush Hazra as Mohor's husband (cameo)

== Soundtrack ==
Biye Bibhrat

Soundtrack album by Ranajoy Bhattacharjee
- Released: 12 July 2023
- Recorded: 2022–2023
- Genre: Feature film soundtrack
- Length: 13:17
- Label: Zee Music Bangla

Official audio
- Biye Bibhrat - Full Album on YouTube

Ranajoy Bhattacharjee chronology
Mitthye Premer Gaan (2023)	Biye Bibhrat (2023)	Ektu Sore Bosun (2023)

The music of the film is composed by Ranajoy Bhattacharjee. The lyrics are written by Barish.

The first song "Jiya Tui Chara" was released on 8 July 2023. The second song "Jhilmil Kora" was released on 10 July 2023. The third song "Ghono Megher Elokeshe" was released on 12 July 2023. The fourth song "Nei Khoti Nei" was released on 14 July 2023.

No.	Title	Singer(s)	Length
1.	"Jiya Tui Chara"	Arijit Singh	3:11
2.	"Jhilmil Kora"	Snigdhajit Bhowmik	3:16
3.	"Ghono Megher Elokeshe"	Arijit Singh, Ashmita Kar	3:38
4.	"Nei Khtoi Nei"	Arijit Singh, Snigdhajit Bhowmik	3:12
Total length:			13:17

== Production ==
=== Filming ===
The principal photography of the film took place in Kolkata, mainly in parts of South Kolkata.

=== Marketing ===
The trailer of the film was dropped on 3 July 2023 on Roadshadow Films official YouTube channel.

== Release ==
The movie was released theatrically on 14 July 2023.

== Reception ==
=== Critical reception ===
Souvik Saha of Cine Kolkata rated the film 3 out of 5 stars and wrote "Biye Bibhrat shines brightly with its stellar performances, visionary direction, and unforgettable moments. However, the film falls short in terms of consistent comedic timing and fully exploring character complexities. Despite its flaws, it remains a remarkable cinematic journey, leaving the audience with a desire for more of its magic." Agnivo Niyogi from The Telegraph wrote " Biye Bibhrat delivers exactly what was promised in the trailer, a delightful romantic comedy. But despite its enjoyable elements, it is overly predictable; its characters and their problems are nothing new. This gap is somewhat filled by the film's soulful soundtrack."

Devarti Ghosh of Ei Samay rated the film 3.5 out of 5 stars and wrote " Raja Chand made the movie 'Biye Vivrat' in that formula. Sweet romantic comedy is the USP of this film, without any vendettaAll in all, you can go to the cinema with your family and watch 'Biye Vivrat' for a few hours while keeping the complexities of life away for a few hours, it won't hurt. " Shatakshi Ganguly of IWM Buzz rated the film 3.5 out of 5 stars and wrote " With Parambrata Chattopadhyay's visionary storytelling, the chemistry between Abir Chatterjee and Parambrata, an outstanding ensemble cast, and meticulous attention to detail in the settings of a Bengali household, the film delivers an unforgettable experience."
