= Reunion (2018 film) =

Bengali film

- Directed by: Murari Mohan Rakshit
- Written by: Murari Mohan Rakshit
- Screenplay by: Murari Mohan Rakshit, Malay Bhattacharya, Shiladitya Guha
- Story by: Murari Mohan Rakshit
- Starring: Parambrata Chatterjee, Raima Sen, Indrasish Roy
- Narrated by: Parambrata Chattopadhyay
- Cinematography: Subhadeep Dey
- Edited by: Anirban Maity
- Music by: Joy Sarkar
- Release date: 18 July 2018
- Country: India
- Language: Bengali

Reunion is a 2018 Indian Bengali-language film. It was directed by Murari Mohan Rakshit and is the first Bengali movie to be screened in the United Arab Emirates.

== Plot ==
Four University friends Arko, Abhi, Joyita and Shuvo meet after twenty years and trigger old memories, set against the backdrop of the 90s, of friendship, romance and active campus politics. Romita is the eye of the audience as through the process of telling her the stories of their younger days a plethora of repressed responses and crisis are revealed. Their finding out of their college senior and leader Rudra, played by Parambrata Chatterjee and his love interest Monideepa played by Raima Sen brings out lost love.

== Cast ==
- Rudra- Parambrata Chatterjee
- Monideepa – Raima Sen
- Romita – Anindita Bose
- Ajoy - Anindya Pulak Banerjee
- Abhi – Saurav Das
- Shuvo – Samadarshi Dutta
- Arindam – Subhrajit Dutta
- Joyita – Saayoni Ghosh
- Arko – Indrasish Roy
