= Shohorer Ushnotomo Din E =

2023 Indian Bengali-language film

- Directed by: Aritra Sen
- Written by: Aritra Sen
- Starring: Vikram Chatterjee; Solanki Roy; Anamika Chakraborty; Anindya Chatterjee; Rahul Dev Bose; Debopriyo Mukherjee
- Cinematography: Basudeb Chakraborty
- Edited by: Sumit Chowdhury
- Production companies: Shadow Films; Roadshow Films; EmVeeBee Media (P) Ltd RT Entertainment
- Release date: 30 June 2023
- Running time: 117 minutes
- Country: India
- Language: Bengali

Shohorer Ushnotomo Din E (transl. On The Warmest Day In The City) is a 2023 Indian Bengali-language Romance drama film written and directed by Aritra Sen and produced by Parambrata Chatterjee. The film stars Vikram Chatterjee and Solanki Roy in lead roles. The film was released on 30 June 2023.

== Plot ==
Sohorer Ushnotomo Din E is a coming-of-age love story of two Kolkata-bred individuals, Ritoban and Anindita. Life poses a second chance for their budding nascent love, when Ritoban, a disillusioned PHD student in London, returns to Kolkata after three years and bumps into Anindita, his college sweetheart who is now a successful RJ. As memories of their romance flash by in the iconic places of the city that seems to have frozen in time, the two ex-lovers individually reminisce about the dreams they had hoped to realize together, before a devastating incident left them with few other choices than breaking up. While Ritoban flew off to London, Anindita, who had entertained a similar career move, was forced to sacrifice it and stay back to take charge of her familial responsibilities, all the while secretly pining for Ritoban to be by her side. In the present, their common friends from college reunite and while each share their unique journeys in the last few years, Anindita and Ritoban maintain an avoidant stance towards each other due to the burden of apologies, unspoken words and piling grievances. Gradually, the hurt, vanity and ego melt away at a cathartic event and Ritoban confesses being miserable in London without Anindita. Anindita too confesses being hurt and feeling defeated in the city, without Ritoban by her side. As the embers of their once-passionate romance, start flickering again, life takes an unexpected new turn. A new opportunity to pursue her dream course in London shows up for Anindita. This time it is Ritoban who pines for Anindita’s love as her long-lost dreams knock at her door, once again. The film is an ode to the city considered ‘dying’ by many but holds in its heart the many incomplete stories of love that have lost themselves in the chase for dreams.

== Cast ==
- Vikram Chatterjee as Ritoban
- Solanki Roy as Anindita
- Anindya Chatterjee
- Rahul Dev Bose
- Debopriyo Mukherjee
- Anamika Chakraborty
- Debesh Roy Chowdhury
- Sujoy Prasad Chatterjee

== Release ==
=== Theatrical ===
The film premiered at the Kolkata International Film Festival. It had its theatrical release on 30 June 2023.

=== Home Video ===
The streaming rights of the film were acquired by ZEE5. It had its worldwide digital release on 25 August 2023.

== Music ==
Shohorer Ushnotomo Din E

Soundtrack album by Nabarun Bose & Akash Chakrabarty
- Released: 23 June 2023
- Recorded: 2022–2023
- Genre: Feature film soundtrack
- Length: 11:22
- Label: Zee Music Bangla

Official audio
- Shohorer Ushnotomo Din E - Full Album on YouTube

No.	Title	Lyrics	Music	Singer(s)	Length
1.	"Sondhya"	Akash Chakrabarty	Akash Chakrabarty	Timir Biswas	3:33
2.	"Raater Kachhe"	Pranjal Das	Nabarun Bose	Arnab Das	3:35
3.	"Time Machine"	Akash Chakrabarty	Nabarun Bose	Lagnajita Chakraborty	4:14
Total length:					11:22
