= Ranajoy Bhattacharjee =

- Born: Ranajoy Bhattacharjee; 27 September 1986 (age 39); Kolkata, West Bengal, India
- Origin: Kolkata, India
- Genres: Hindustani classical music, pop, rock
- Occupations: Singer, Music Composer, Music producer, Lyricist, Poet
- Instruments: Harmonium, Piano, Keyboard, Synthesizer, Melodica, Ukulele
- Years active: 2014–present

Ranajoy Bhattacharjee is an Indian music composer, singer, music producer and lyricist hailing from Kolkata, India who is associated mainly with the Bengali Film Industry. He is known for his songs "Preme Pora Baron" from Sweater, "Mon Kyamoner Jonmodin" from Hridpindo, "Geetabitan Er Dibbi" from Kolkata Chalantika, "Nirobotay Chhilo" from Mitthye Premer Gaan and others.

== Early life ==
Ranajoy had always been musically inclined. He took a formal training in Indian Classical Vocal Music, Nazrul Geeti and Western Classical Piano. He completed his B.Tech in Computer Science Engineering from University of Calcutta. He was primarily driven to acquire degrees in statistics and computer science and then a job in the IT industry. However, he soon left the job and moved to Mumbai in 2014 to pursue full time music.

== Discography ==
=== Films ===
Year	Film / Album	Role	Songs
2019	Sweater	Composer, Singer, Lyricist	Full Album (Except Wool Bonar Panchali)
2022	Abar Bochhor Koori Pore	Composer, Singer, Lyricist	Full Album
2022	Mini	Composer & Lyricist	Ador Obhiman
2022	Hridpindo	Composer, Singer, Lyricist	Full Album
2022	Aay Khuku Aay	Composer, Singer, Lyricist	Title Track & Ebhabeo Preme Pora Jay
2022	Kolkata Chalantika	Composer, Singer, Lyricist	Geetabitan Er Dibbi, Kolkata Chalantika Title Track & Sitar Theme
2022	Kothamrito	Composer & Singer	Kichu Kotha Baki
2022	Prosenjit weds Rituparna	Composer & Singer	Durottwo & Nayikar Mon
2022	Subho Bijoya	Composer, Singer, Lyricist	Keno Dure Jas
2023	Mitthye Premer Gaan	Composer, Singer, Lyricist	Nirobotay Chhilo & Ochena Karor Buke
2023	Biye Bibhrat	Composer	Full Album
2023	Ektu Sore Bosun	Composer	Nispolok
2024	Pariah	Composer, Singer	Full Album
2024	Bijoyar Pore	Composer, Singer, Lyricist	Full Album except Keho Karo Mon Bojhe Na
2024	Lukochuri	Composer, Singer, Lyricist	Full Album
2024	Ajogyo	Composer, Lyricist	Tui Amar Hobi Na
2024	Tekka	Composer, Lyricist	Full Album
2025	Omorshongi	Composer, Singer, Lyricist	Shiuli
2025	Killbill Society	Composer	Shaatjawnmer Porichoy
2025	Ranna Baati	Composer, Singer, Lyricist	Full Album

=== Web series ===
Year	Title	Language	Role	Songs
2015	Stories by Rabindranath Tagore	Bengali	Composer, Singer	Song & Background score
2020	Pati Patni Aur Panga	Bengali	Composer, Singer	Song & Background score

=== Tele Film ===
Year	Title	Language	Role	Songs
2020	Dadur Kirti	Bengali	Composer, Singer	Song & Background score

=== Short film ===
Year	Title	Language	Role	Songs
2018	Ludo	Hindi	Composer	Background score
2018	No Moon Coming Soon	Hindi	Composer	Background score
2020	Bharam	Hindi	Composer	Background score
2020	Ekti Tara	Bengali	Composer	Background score
2021	Swad Anusar	Hindi	Composer	Song & Background score

=== Tv Serials ===
Year	Title	Language	Role	Songs
2016	Mann Mein Vishwas Hain	Hindi	Composer, Singer	Background score
2017	Bhutu	Hindi	Composer	Title track
2020	Harano Sur	Bengali	Composer, Singer	Title Track & other songs

=== Documentary ===
Year	Title	Language	Role
2017	Jersey no. 6	Hindi	Composer & Singer

=== Advertisement/TVC/Brand ===
Year	Title	Language	Role
2017-18	Canara Hsbc Obc	Hindi	Composer
2020	Sunlight	Bengali/Malayalam	Composer, Lyricist
2020	Aaina for Double Mint	Bengali	Composer, Singer, Lyricist
2020	Surer Bagan for Double Mint	Bengali	Composer, Singer, Lyricist
2020	Sunlight Jiboner Rong	Bengali	Composer, Lyricist
2021	Tanishq	Bengali	Composer
2015	Jee lu	Hindi	Music Composer with Singer - Rick d Performer
2016	Dil hue Baware	Hindi	Music Composer with Singer - Rick d Performer

== Awards ==
Award	Category	Film/Song
Filmfare Awards East	Best Music Album	Sweater
Filmfare Awards East	Best Lyrics	"Preme Pora Baron"
Mirchi Music Awards Bangla	Film Song of the Year	"Preme Pora Baron"
Mirchi Music Awards Bangla	Film Album of the Year	Sweater
Mirchi Music Awards Bangla	Film Music Composer of the Year	"Preme Pora Baron"
Mirchi Music Awards Bangla	Film Lyricist of the Year	"Preme Pora Baron"
Mirchi Music Awards Bangla	Upcoming Male Vocalist of the Year	"Preme Pora Baron"
Mirchi Music Awards Bangla	Upcoming Music Composer of the Year	"Preme Pora Baron"
Mirchi Music Awards Bangla	Upcoming Lyricist of the Year	"Preme Pora Baron"
Tele Cine Awards	Best Lyrics	"Preme Pora Baron"
Film and Frame Digital Film Awards	Best Lyrics	"Preme Pora Baron"
