= Baari Tar Bangla =

- Directed by: Rangan Chakravarty
- Written by: Rangan Chakravarty
- Screenplay by: Rangan Chakravarty, Utsav Mukherjee
- Story by: Rangan Chakravarty
- Produced by: Satrajit Sen; Piyal Bhadra
- Starring: Saswata Chatterjee; Raima Sen; Sumit Samaddar
- Music by: Debajyoti Mishra
- Production companies: Tripod Entertainment; Reproduction Entertainment
- Release date: 16 May 2014 (Kolkata)
- Running time: 106 minutes
- Country: India
- Language: Bengali
- Budget: INR 90,00,000.00

Baari Tar Bangla is a 2014 Indian Bengali language satirical comedy film by Rangan Chakravarty and produced by Satrajit Sen and Piyal Bhadra in association with Reproduction Entertainment Pvt. Ltd. and Tripod Entertainment. The film was released on 16 May 2014.

== Plot ==
Roopchand Sen is a professional writer who can no longer write. When he determines that the problem is not physical, but psychological, he goes to see a psychiatrist, Abanti, who uncovers his life story.

A middle-class boy, Roopchand was pushed by his mother to become a Bangla writer like Bengali icon Satyajit Ray. At first, Roopchand succeeded as an advertising writer, but when the economy went into a downturn, so did his career. His mother, disappointed in her ambitions for her son, committed suicide. Roopchand thereafter became a political writer on the urging of his father, but as politics and parties changed and the message he was asked to advocate kept altering, he eventually lost that career as well. Thereafter, he found he could not write in Bangla at all. So used to writing for others had he become that he was unable to express himself anymore.

Understanding his problem, Abanti urges him to be Roopchand, the copy writer once again. Roopchand finds a cause he cares about, the anti-eviction movement, and regains his ability to write.

== Cast ==
- Saswata Chatterjee as Roopchand Sen
- Raima Sen as Abanti
- Sumit Samaddar as Photik
- Tulika Basu
- Shantilal Mukherjee
