= Choddobeshi =

Indian Bengali mystery thriller series

- Release poster
- Genre: Mystery thriller
- Based on: Chowdhury Barir Rahashyo by Abhirup Sarkar
- Written by: Padmanabha Dasgupta
- Dialogues by: Padmanabha Dasgupta
- Screenplay by: Padmanabha Dasgupta
- Starring: Parambrata Chattopadhyay; Ritabhari Chakraborty; June Maliah
- Theme music composer: Nabarun Bose
- Composer: Nabarun Bose
- Country of origin: India
- Original language: Bengali
- No. of seasons: 1
- No. of episodes: 7

Production
- Cinematography: Basudeb Chakraborty
- Editor: Sumit
- Camera setup: Single-camera
- Running time: 18-26 minutes
- Production company: Roadshow Films

Original release
- Release: 10 July 2026 – present

Choddobeshi (transl. Disguised) is an Indian Bengali mystery thriller web series directed by Aritra Sen. The series has been written by Padmanabha Dasgupta and produced under the banner of Roadshow Films. Dasgupta has adapted the story from Abhirup Sarkar's novel Chowdhury Barir Rahashyo.

The series stars Parambrata Chattopadhyay in the lead role while June Maliah, Ritabhari Chakraborty and Srijla Guha play other pivotal roles. Nabarun Bose has composed the music as well as the background score of the series. It was streamed on the Bengali OTT platform Hoichoi from 10 July 2026.

== Synopsis ==
Aditya Majumdar is a private investigator who mostly works uncovering marital affairs. His struggling career has also affected his family life — his wife Ratna lives separately with their daughter. Things take a turn when popular actress Mandakini Chowdhury approaches him with a serious case. She believes that someone is trying to kill her. So she asks Aditya to find out who is behind the threat.

== Cast ==
- Parambrata Chattopadhyay as Aditya Majumdar, a struggling private detective
- Ritabhari Chakraborty as Ratna Majumdar, Aditya's wife Ratna
- June Maliah as Mandakini Chowdhury, a renowned actress
- Srijla Guha as Sohini Maitra, Mandakini's daughter
- Bharat Kaul as Subir Chowdhury, Mandakini's second husband
- Indrasish Roy as Sankhadeep, Mandakini's step-son
- Paayel Sarkar as Martha Savio
- Kheya Chattopadhyay as Sankhamala, Mandakini's step-daughter
- Bimal Giri as Subrata Sen, Sankhamala's husband
- Shoumo Banerjee as ACP Gautam

== Episodes ==
No.	Title	Directed by	Written by	Original release date
1	"Tiktiki!"	Aritra Sen	Padmanabha Dasgupta	10 July 2026
2	"Chowdhury Bari"	Aritra Sen	Padmanabha Dasgupta	10 July 2026
3	"Khuror Kol"	Aritra Sen	Padmanabha Dasgupta	10 July 2026
4	"Haat e Pencil"	Aritra Sen	Padmanabha Dasgupta	10 July 2026
5	"Moronfaand"	Aritra Sen	Padmanabha Dasgupta	10 July 2026
6	"Durobhisondhi"	Aritra Sen	Padmanabha Dasgupta	10 July 2026
7	"Ostader Maar"	Aritra Sen	Padmanabha Dasgupta	10 July 2026

== Reception ==
=== Critical reception ===
Torna Chakraborty of The Times of India rated the series 3/5 stars and wrote "Choddhobeshi is a character-driven mystery that prefers to unravel its secrets patiently rather than rely on edge-of-the-seat thrills. While it boasts an intriguing premise and a dependable ensemble cast, the series doesn't always sustain the momentum needed to make it a memorable whodunnit." She praised the layer-wise unravelling of the mysteries, the pace of the narrative in the second half, the performance of the actors, the cinematography and the crisp dialogues but bemoaned the stretched middle episodes, lack of enough thrill, below par background score, low impact in the final twist, lack of sufficient emotional sequences and the lack of a lasting impression at the end.

Debatri Ghosh of Sangbad Pratidin reviewed the series and noted "It is a known fact that if the main story lacks excitement, the series will not be tense either. So although Aritra Sen's big screen works were popular, this venture could not come close to the expectations." She appreciated Parambrata's performance and creative direction, June's performance and the performance of the more seasoned supporting cast but criticized the lack of anything new in the series, the usage of the same old template of an dysfunctional family, the poor performance of the young supporting actors, the weak character writing, the below par mystery unravelling at the end and the lack of anything to mark a lasting impression.

== Sequel ==
The second season of the series was announced on 30 September 2026 along with 25 other projects, as a part of Hoichoi's upcoming slate announcement on their tenth year. Titled as Choddobeshi 2, it is slated to be directed by Parambrata Chattopadhyay, who also reprises the lead role in the series.
