= Nishijapon =

2005 Indian Bengali-language film

- Directed by: Sandip Ray
- Written by: Narayan Gangopadhyay
- Produced by: R.D. Bansal
- Starring: Soumitra Chatterjee; Deepankar De; Sabyasachi Chakrabarty; Parambrata Chatterjee; Rituparna Sengupta; Raima Sen
- Cinematography: Barun Raha
- Music by: Sandip Ray
- Release date: 2005
- Running time: 100 minutes
- Country: India
- Language: Bengali

Nishijapon (Bengali: নিশিযাপন, After the Night... Dawn) (2005) is a Bengali film directed by Sandip Ray, based on a novel of the same name by Narayan Gangopadhyay.

== Synopsis ==
Bimal (Soumitra Chatterjee) is visited by his family and his friend in his Darjeeling house. Anita (Rituparna Sengupta), his elder son Nirmal's wife, takes good care of them, spending most of her time in the kitchen. Brojen (Deepankar De), the managing director of a tea estate and Bimal's friend, irritates everyone, especially Nirmal (Sabyasachi Chakrabarty), with his stories of his guru's miracles and his over-enthusiasm for food. Anita keeps trying to convince Shyamal (Parambrata Chatterjee), her brother-in-law and Sunita (Raima Sen), to see each other. Shyamal and Sunita grow to like each other and Anita enthusiastically declares the alliance to Bimal. Meanwhile, torrential rain makes it impossible for Ram, the servant, to get much food from the nearly closed market. That night the rain stops. Suddenly, all the inmates of the house are jolted out of their sleeps by a terrible earthquake. Power is cut off and most of the things inside the house are broken. Nirmal goes out to discover that Ram's house and orchard have been destroyed in a landslide. The next morning they discover that the wooden bridge which connected them to the world was lying broken. Soon, there is serious shortage of food. Tempers flare as Nirmal and Brojen have a wild argument. Nirmal tries to climb down the mountain to get help, slips and injures himself but saved by Shyamal. Meanwhile, Brojen starts to have optical illusions. He demands more food, which leaves Anita fasting. Nirmal is infuriated by the gesture of Brojen and insults him for being insensitive and an uninvited guest who is a burden to them in this hour of crisis. Anita becomes weak and even faints. Shyamal tries to climb down the mountain alone, but his nerves fail when he sees a dead body stuck in the rocks. He sees Anita drink the water washing a milk powder packet. Nirmal shouts at Brojen insulting him sorely. Anita and Shyamal try to control him but fail. Anita cries out in anger to reveal the truth behind their apparently happy marriage. Brojen, driven nearly insane by hunger, tries to walk out during the night. Shyamal has to knock him unconscious to bring him back to his room. Sunita feeds her share of rice to Anita who tells her not to trust anyone, Brojen on Shyamal. Bimal contemplates suicide with sleeping pills. Everyone is shocked out of their respective stupors by the sounds of gunshots. Nirmal shoots birds in the hope of roasting them. When Shyamal tries to stop him, he points the gun at him, saying that soon the only way out would be cannibalism. A shocked and desperate Shyamal begins to try to climb down the mountain again with the horrified Sunita watching. At this moment, relief comes, making arrangements for the family's rescue, bringing hope to all.

== Cast ==
- Sabyasachi Chakrabarty - Nirmal Das
- Soumitra Chatterjee - Bimal Das
- Deepankar De - Brojen Lahiri
- Rituparna Sengupta - Anita Das
- Raima Sen - Sunita
- Parambrata Chatterjee - Shyamal Das

== Awards ==
- BFJA Awards (2006)
- Best Screenplay-Sandip Ray
- BFJA - Most Promising Actor Award- Parambrato Chattopadhyay
- BFJA - Most Promising Actress Award- Raima Sen
