= Ahalya (2015 film) =

- Directed by: Sujoy Ghosh
- Written by: Anupam Roy (Dialogues)
- Screenplay by: Sujoy Ghosh
- Produced by: Sujoy Ghosh
- Starring: Radhika Apte; Soumitra Chatterjee; Tota Roy Chowdhury
- Cinematography: Satyajit Pande (Setu)
- Edited by: Namrata Rao
- Music by: Anupam Roy
- Production company: Boundscript Motion Pictures
- Distributed by: Royal Stag Barrel Select Large Short Films
- Release date: 20 July 2015
- Running time: 14 minutes
- Country: India
- Language: Bengali

Ahalya is a 2015 Indian mystery thriller short film directed by Sujoy Ghosh with Radhika Apte, Soumitra Chatterjee and Tota Roy Chowdhury playing the lead roles.

== Plot ==
A young police officer, Indra Sen arrives at the home of famous ageing artist, Goutam Sadhu, to investigate the case of a missing man named Arjun as he received an information that the last person he met before getting disappeared was the artist. There, he is greeted by Goutam's young and beautiful wife Ahalya, whom he had taken to be daughter of Goutam Sadhu. Indra sees an array of realistic looking dolls on a mantlepiece, and notices that one looks almost identical to Arjun. A stone, which is encased in glass, is also placed there. One doll falls over, and Ahalya chastises the figure before placing back with the others. She attributes this sudden movement to wind from the ceiling fan. Ahalya serves tea to the men and subtly flirts with Indra in Goutam's presence, while Goutam's distracted. She then returns upstairs to her room but forgets her mobile phone on the table. Indra asks Goutam about Arjun, a model who has not been seen since working for the artist. Goutam tells Indra that the stone in the glass case has magical qualities and that anybody who touches it turns into whosoever he or she wishes. He tells Indra that Arjun knew of the stone and suggests that he may have used it. Indra does not believe him initially but agrees to try it. Ahalya calls down to her husband to bring her mobile phone to her. Goutam instructs Indra to hold the stone and imagine himself to be Goutam, taking the mobile phone up to Ahalya. He does so. Entering the bedroom, Indra sees himself as he truly is, but his mirror reflection is that of Goutam. Ahalya speaks to Indra as if he were her husband, and instructs him to get rid of the police officer, and hurry back to bed with her. Indra steps into the hallway momentarily, but then returns to the room to romantically embrace Ahalya.

The scene cuts away to Indra being in a dark area, restrained and unable to move. His screams are unheard, as he is now trapped within a new doll, which sits with the collection of other dolls on the mantlepiece. As he struggles, his doll falls over, and is picked up and chastised by Ahalya. The film ends with the restrained Indra hopelessly screaming in the dark area within the doll.

== Cast ==
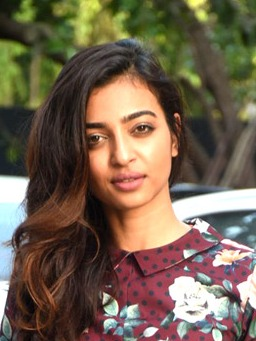
Radhika Apte Portrayed the Lead role of Ahalya

- Radhika Apte as Ahalya, based on the Hindu epic character Ahalya.
- Soumitra Chatterjee as Goutam Sadhu, an artist and Ahalya's husband, based on the sage Gautama Maharishi.
- Tota Roy Chowdhury as the Policeman Indra Sen, based on the god Indra.
- Ayushman Mitra as Arjun.

== Inspirations ==
The film takes elements from the story of Ahalya from Ramayana but crafts a modern version of it with a spin. In the original tale the young and beautiful Ahalya is seduced by Indra (the king of the gods), and is cursed by much older husband sage Gautama to turn into a stone. But in the retelling of the story in the film, the punishment is visited on the character based on Indra alone, while the woman is shown to be an accomplice in the seduction game.

The film has shades of The Collection, an episode from The Twilight Zone TV series and of Satyajit Ray's short story Professor Shonku and Strange Dolls (Professor Shonku O Ashchorjo Putul) and also of Alma, an animated short film.

== Sequel ==
Director Ghosh told media that there will be a sequel to this film, which was scheduled to release in February 2017.

== See also ==
- Anukul
