= Ranna Baati =

2025 Indian Bengali film by Pratim D. Gupta

- Theatrical release poster
- Directed by: Pratim D. Gupta
- Written by: Pratim D. Gupta
- Produced by: Pradip Kumar Nandy
- Starring: Ritwick Chakraborty; Sohini Sarkar; Solanki Roy; Barun Chanda; Ida Dasgupta; Sayan Ghosh; Roja Paromita Dey; Anirban Chakrabarti; Tota Roy Chowdhury; Shruti Das
- Cinematography: Turja Ghosh
- Edited by: Sanglap Bhowmik
- Music by: Ranajoy Bhattacharjee
- Production company: Nandy Movies
- Release date: 7 November 2025
- Running time: 122 minutes
- Country: India
- Language: Bengali

Ranna Baati is a 2025 Indian Bengali-language culinary drama film written and directed by Pratim D. Gupta. The film stars Ritwick Chakraborty, Solanki Roy, Ida Dasgupta and Sohini Sarkar in lead roles, with Anirban Chakrabarti and Barun Chanda in supporting parts. The story is a family drama that explores memory, grief and the bonds between generations through food and a recipe book. The film was released on 7 November 2025 and received generally positive reviews for its warm treatment, performances and its use of food as emotional metaphor.

== Plot ==
A warm, character-driven drama, Ranna Baati centers on a father and his daughter who are estranged after a family tragedy. When an old, forgotten recipe book and the act of cooking resurface, they begin a tentative journey toward reconciliation. Food—recipes, communal meals and kitchen rituals—serves as the film’s primary language for memory, grief and intergenerational connection, with moments of gentle humor and poignant sadness woven through domestic scenes.

After the death of her mother Supriya from cancer, Mohor develops a hostile attitude towards her schoolmates and her father, Shantanu. Following an incident in which she injures a classmate with a compass after hearing them speak ill of her and her friend Rohan, Shantanu realises that he has been largely absent from his daughter’s upbringing. Noting that Mohor’s only fond memories are of cooking with her mother, he enrols in cooking classes conducted by Rita Ray, who advises him to begin with simple dishes. Although initially unsuccessful, Shantanu gradually learns to cook for Mohor and develops a growing affection for Rita, who appears to be harbouring a troubled past. Mohor begins reconnecting with her father after he cooks for her and after Rita secretly sends dinner home for her. Throughout the narrative, Shantanu’s friend Godot and his father Ajit, who lives in an old-age home, offer him guidance on how to repair his relationship with Mohor, including encouraging him to consider remarriage.

Rita's past is revealed when Shantanu prepares a mutton dish for her, triggering memories of a traumatic incident in her previous marriage. While cooking mutton in a pressure cooker and working on her laptop, her baby—startled by the cooker’s whistle—fell from the stairs and died. Her husband, unable to forgive her, turned to substance abuse, eventually leading to their divorce. Rita later rebuilt her life by starting her own cookery classes.

Meanwhile, Mohor, having secretly followed Shantanu to his cooking class, mistakenly believes that he is attempting to escape his responsibilities through his friendship with Rita. After a failed attempt to cook an omelette due to her unresolved trauma, she breaks down and finds comfort in her father’s arms. Shantanu then prepares a dish from Supriya’s recipe book Ranna Baati, which helps mend his strained relationship with Mohor.

Shantanu and Mohor later arrange a family dinner, during which Rita arrives on Mohor’s invitation. Rohan also joins them. Mohor expresses her support for Shantanu's relationship with Rita and encourages him to confess his feelings. Following the gathering, both Shantanu and Rita grow closer, while Mohor spends time with Rohan.

In the end-credits scene, Shantanu launches a social media cooking channel titled Ranna Baati, featuring recipes from Supriya’s book. He is assisted by Rita and Mohor, and after filming the first episode, the film crew appears on camera to celebrate the completion of the shoot.

== Cast ==
- Ritwick Chakraborty as Shantanu Dasgupta
- Sohini Sarkar as Rita Ray, Shantanu's teacher and later love-interest
- Solanki Roy as Supriya Dasgupta, Shantanu's deceased wife
- Ida Dasgupta as Mohor Dasgupta, Shantanu's Daughter
- Barun Chanda as Ajit Dasgupta, Shantanu's father
- Sayan Ghosh as Tarak, Rita's receptionist

=== Cameo appearances ===
- Anirban Chakrabarti as Godot, Shantanu's friend
- Tota Roy Chowdhury as Arpan, Rita's ex-husband
- Shruti Das as Natasha, one of Shantanu's online dates
- Roja Paromita Dey as Godot's wife

== Production ==
Director Pratim D. Gupta conceived Ranna Baati as a film about food and memory. Promotional interviews conducted around the film’s release describe Gupta’s personal interest in culinary stories and how cooking can map emotional histories. Teasers and trailers were released in the weeks preceding the November release, including a teaser timed to Mahalaya.

== Soundtrack ==
The music and the background score of the film has been composed by Ranajoy Bhattacharjee. The lyrics have been penned by Bhattacharjee himself, Durba Sen Bandyopadhyay Tamoghna Chatterjee and Pratim D. Gupta.

The first single "Dorja Khule Dao" was released on 27 October 2025. The second song "Ranna Baati Title Song" was dropped on 1 November 2025. The third song "Tumi Sudhu Tumi" was released on 5 November 2025. The fourth and last single "Shamner Dike Takao" was released on 12 November 2025, post the film's theatrical release.

Ranna Baati
No.	Title	Lyrics	Singer(s)	Length
1.	"Dorja Khule Dao"	Ranajoy Bhattacharjee	Ranajoy Bhattacharjee	4:12
2.	"Tumi Sudhu Tumi"	Durba Sen Bandyopadhyay	Kinjal Chatterjee	3:31
3.	"Ranna Baati Title Song"	Tamoghna Chatterjee	Shreya Ghoshal	3:19
4.	"Shamner Dike Takao"	Ranajoy Bhattacharjee, Pratim D. Gupta	Rapurna Bhattacharya	2:48
Total length:				13:50

== Release ==
Ranna Baati was theatrically released in India on 7 November 2025.

== Reception ==
Raima Ganguly of The Times of India rated the film 3.5/5 stars and wrote "Ranna Baati ultimately becomes a film about nourishment, of the body, the heart, and the bonds we think we have lost." She praised the use of food as a metaphor for healing, Ritwick's natural performance, Solanki's brief appearance, Anirban Chakravarti and Barun Chanda in supporting roles and Sohini's tender affectionate performance. She also applauded the cinematography and the film's title track sung by Shreya Ghoshal but bemoaned the over-stretched length of the film.

Anurupa Chakraborty of The Indian Express rated the film 3.5/5 stars and opined " As the saying goes, when you're feeling down, a plate of your favourite food can make you forget all your troubles. The story of Ranna-Bati is exactly that. The subtle thread about father-daughter." She applauded the performance of the lead trio, the supporting cast and the direction.

== Future ==
The title of the film at the end reads Ranna Baati: Chapter 1, indicating a possible sequel.
