= Shonar Pahar =

2018 Bengali film

- Directed by: Parambrata Chatterjee
- Starring: Tanuja; Jisshu Sengupta; Soumitra Chatterjee; Arunima Ghosh; Parambrata Chattopadhyay
- Release date: 6 July 2018 (Kolkata)
- Running time: 139 minutes
- Country: India
- Language: Bengali

Shonar Pahar is a 2018 Indian Bengali drama film directed by Parambrata Chattopadhyay. The film portrays the journey and friendship between two people, a 7-year old young orphan and a 70-year old grandmother.

== Plot ==
The film opens in an old dilapidated home in the suburbs of Kolkata, with Upama, a 72-year old retired school teacher residing alone. She is estranged from her only son, Soumya, who lives separately with his wife, Moumita. Upama is shown to be bitter and reminisces the time spent with Soumya. The owner of a local NGO, played by Parambrata Chattopadhyay, introduces her to 7-year old orphan boy named Bitlu, and a bond begins to form between them. One day, Upama and Bitlu go missing and thus ensues an emotional journey for Soumya to find his mother and mend the distance between them.

== Cast ==
- Tanuja as Upama Mukherjee
- Jisshu Sengupta as Shoumya Mukherjee
- Soumitra Chatterjee as Rajat
- Parambrata Chattopadhyay as Rajdeep the owner of Anandaghar, an NGO
- Swarnava Sanyal as Child Soumo
- Srijato Bandhopadhyay as Bitlu
- Arunima Ghosh as Moumita, Soumya's wife
- Lama Haldar as a cab driver
