= Ei Raat Tomar Amaar =

2025 Indian Bengali drama film by Parambrata Chattopadhyay

- Release poster
- Bengali: এই রাত তোমার আমার
- Directed by: Parambrata Chattopadhyay
- Written by: Chironjib Bordoloi (CJ)
- Produced by: Vishnu Mohta
- Starring: Anjan Dutt; Aparna Sen; Parambrata Chattopadhyay
- Cinematography: Prosenjit Chowdhury
- Edited by: Sumit Chowdhury
- Music by: Indraadip Dasgupta
- Production company: Hoichoi Studios
- Distributed by: SVF
- Release date: 31 January 2025
- Running time: 104 Minutes
- Country: India
- Language: Bengali

Ei Raat Tomar Amaar (transl. This Night is yours and mine) is a 2025 Indian Bengali-language psychological drama film. Directed by Parambrata Chattopadhyay, the original story and screenplay have been written by Chironjib Bordoloi. Produced under the banner of Hoichoi by Vishnu Mohta, the film stars Anjan Dutt and Aparna Sen in the lead roles. It explores the complexities of relationships, mutual understanding, and the harsh realities of life. The film was released in theaters across West Bengal on January 31.

The original story and Hindi-language screenplay by Chironjib Bordoloi were adapted into Bengali and made more contemporary by the director. This marks the third cinematic collaboration between Aparna Sen and Anjan Dutt, whose partnership has had a significant impact on Bengali cinema. The film's music has been composed by Indraadip Dasgupta, while cinematography has been handled by Prosenjit Choudhury.

The film's title evokes memories of the timeless song "Ei Raat Tomar Amar"—composed by Gauri Prasanna Majumdar and sung by the legendary Hemanta Mukhopadhyay for the 1959 film Deep Jwele Jai. This iconic song served as an inspiration for the new film produced by Hoichoi Studios.

== Plot ==
Amar Gupta is struggling to come to terms with his wife Jayita's battle with cancer. Despite ongoing treatment, her health is deteriorating. Meanwhile, Amar shares a strained relationship with his son, Joy. Determined to care for his wife alone, he refuses to stay in Kolkata or move to London with his son. Instead, he takes Jayita to their ancestral home in North Bengal.

As they reminisce about their journey together, memories of love, regret, and companionship resurface. Over the course of a single night, past emotions unfold, revealing that their love has remained unwavering.

== Cast ==
- Anjan Dutt as Amar Gupta
- Aparna Sen as Jayita Gupta
- Parambrata Chattopadhyay as Joy
- Rohit Mukherjee as Jayita's brother
- Swati Mukherjee
- Debdut Roy
- Shruti Das as Mira, Joy's wife

== Release ==
The film was initially scheduled for release on August 30, 2024, but was later postponed to January 31, 2025, when it premiered in theaters across West Bengal. It is set to release on the OTT platform Hoichoi.

Additionally, the film was screened at the Kolkata International Film Festival.

== Reception ==
Sudip Ghosh of Anandabazar Patrika rated the film 9 out of 10, praising its execution despite being confined to a single setting. He wrote, "Although the film is set within the walls of a house, its screenplay, dialogues, and cinematography keep the audience engaged. The use of light and shadow is remarkable, and Indraadip Dasgupta’s music perfectly complements the film’s atmosphere. Under the director’s skilled guidance, every aspect of the film is beautifully crafted. Its refined storytelling and craftsmanship give it an international appeal."

Subhsmita Kanji of Hindustan Times rated the film 4.5 out of 5, praising its nuanced portrayal of marital complexities, illness, memories, and newfound realizations. She wrote, "Anjan Dutt and Aparna Sen deliver impeccable performances, capturing the deep struggles of marriage, illness, and emotional rediscovery. Despite its slow pace, the beauty of the dialogues, screenplay, and background score makes it a unique cinematic experience. The director skillfully parallels the strained father-son relationship with themes of familial ego and distance. With its emotionally charged yet restrained storytelling, this film effortlessly finds a place in the audience’s heart."

Sandipta Bhanj of Sangbad Pratidin wrote, "Parambrata Chattopadhyay’s Ei Raat Tomar Amar tells the story of a lonely couple expressing years of unspoken emotions on their 50th wedding anniversary night. Aparna Sen and Anjan Dutt deliver exceptional performances, bringing to life the unspoken words, emotions, and nostalgia of a long marriage. With a well-crafted screenplay, the director beautifully captures the tensions and realities of familial relationships. The film’s crisp narrative, realistic character portrayals, and emotionally charged moments make it a deeply moving experience."

Navanita Sarkar of Zee 24 Ghanta wrote, "Under Parambrata Chattopadhyay’s direction, Ei Raat Tomar Amar is a poignant tale exploring the depth and complexities of an elderly couple’s relationship. Aparna Sen and Anjan Dutt deliver stellar performances, while the soft lighting, soothing music, and realistic storytelling leave a lasting impact. Themes of parental distance, loneliness, and emotional bonds add to the film’s authenticity. The film does not dwell on the breakdown of relationships but rather celebrates their endurance. Indraadip Dasgupta’s soulful score, atmospheric music, and restrained cinematography elevate the experience. This stands as one of Parambrata’s finest directorial works and signals a promising future for Bengali cinema."
