= Burhanpur, Madhya Pradesh =

Village in Madhya Pradesh, India

Coordinates: 21°18′N 76°14′E

Burhanpur
- Village
- Location within India
- Country: India
- MP: Anuppur
- District: Anuppur

Languages
- Time zone: UTC+5:30 (IST)

Burhanpur is a village near Kotma tehsil (municipality). It is situated in block Kotma which is in Anuppur district, Madhya Pradesh, India. It had a population of 2079 according to the 2011 census.
