= Anukul =

- Poster of the film
- Directed by: Sujoy Ghosh
- Written by: Ritesh Shah (Dialogues); Sujoy Ghosh (Dialogues)
- Screenplay by: Sujoy Ghosh
- Story by: Sujoy Ghosh
- Based on: Anukul by Satyajit Ray
- Produced by: Sujoy Ghosh
- Starring: Parambrata Chatterjee; Saurabh Shukla
- Cinematography: Satyajit Pande (Setu)
- Edited by: Namrata Rao
- Music by: Clinton Cerejo
- Production company: Boundscript Motion Pictures
- Distributed by: Royal Stag Barrel Select Large Short Films
- Release date: 4 October 2017
- Running time: 21 minutes
- Country: India
- Language: Hindi

Anukul is a 2017 Indian Hindi-language science fiction drama short film directed by Sujoy Ghosh with Parambrata Chatterjee and Saurabh Shukla in the lead roles. It is based on the eponymous short story written by Satyajit Ray.

== Plot ==
Nikunj Chaturvedi, a Hindi Teacher, buys an android from a salesperson of Chowringhee Robot Supply Corp. Before buying it, Nikunj Babu is warned by the salesperson not to hit the android named Anukul.

A few days later, Nikunj Babu's cousin brother Ratan visits Nikunj Babu at his home. He is surprised to see that his brother had bought a robot. Since he had recently been fired from his workplace due to complications with androids, the enraged Ratan proceeds to hit Anukul in the head with a clothing iron, causing Anukul to shut down.

In a different visit to his cousin brother's house, Ratan tells Nikunj Babu (who has recently lost his job due to a much-smarter and more efficient android) that he had become rich by inheriting the wealth from a recently deceased relative. While Nikunj Babu is away, the drunk Ratan again attempts to hit the android, forcing Anukul to electrocute him with a high voltage electric spark, resulting in his untimely demise. The doctor, who examines Ratan, claims that he died from a heart attack.

A lawyer visits Nikunj Babu at his home from whom Nikunj Babu learns that he has inherited Ratan's whole wealth, as he is the only living next of kin. He is surprised to know that the value of his newly discovered wealth is ₹11.5 crore. Nikunj Babu and Anukul briefly exchange glances, as the film ends.

== Cast ==
- Parambrata Chatterjee as Anukul, a humanoid robot who has human-like thinking.
- Saurabh Shukla as Nikunj Chaturvedi, a school teacher and the owner of Anukul.
- Kharaj Mukherjee as Ratan, the cousin brother of Nikunj Babu.
- Kanchan Mullick as Kanchan Khatmal, the president of Human Servants Association.
- Barun Chanda as the unnamed Lawyer
- Ekavali Khanna as the CRS salesperson
- Dr. Ranjan Raychowdhury as himself

== Production ==
Director Sujoy Ghosh wanted to make Anukul after the success of his 2015 short film Ahalya. He had initially cast Ronodeep Bose for the role of Anukul. But, the actor met with a bike accident and slipped into coma. Ghosh had also thought of casting Abir Chatterjee and Jisshu Sengupta for the role, but that did not go through. So, Ghosh had to shelve the project. After some time, the project was re-opened and Ghosh started to shoot Anukul with a brand new cast. Starring in the short film are Kharaj Mukherjee, Saurabh Shukla and Parambrata Chatterjee.

== Reception ==
The film gained above 100,000 views within 24 hours of its release.

The short film has received positive responses from the critics around India. The Indian Express said, "The short film makes one think about the possibilities that are on the verge of becoming a reality and Ghosh’s haunting tone in some parts of the film leaves you with an eerie feeling. It makes one wonder that if this is the future we’re actively stepping into, then the race for survival is going to turn even more brutal but only for those who are unwilling to welcome it." A notable Indian actor, Amitabh Bacchan, has praised the short film. Hindustan Times said, "Both Saurabh and Parambrata give understated performances, in sync with the mood of the film. And, without saying much, the climax leaves us in a dilemma - should we judge the characters for what they did or should we applaud their presence of mind?".

== See also ==
- Ahalya
