= Damayanti (TV series) =

Indian web series

- Release poster
- Genre: Detective
- Story by: Manoj Sen
- Directed by: Aritra Sen, Rohan Ghose
- Country of origin: India
- Original languages: Bengali; Hindi
- No. of seasons: 2
- No. of episodes: 7 + 7

Production
- Executive producer: Riddhie Basak
- Cinematography: Tuban
- Editor: Sumit Chowdhury
- Production company: Roadshow Films

Original release
- Release: 22 October 2020 – present

Damayanti is an Indian Bengali television-series released on Bengali OTT platform Hoichoi on 22 October 2020. On season 4 announcement Hoichoi announced their upcoming twenty-five web series, Damayanti based on the story of Manoj Sen is one of them. Directed by Aritra Sen and Rohan Ghosh the series features Tuhina Das, Indrasish Roy, Soumya Banerjee, Chandrayee Ghosh, Amrita Chattopadhyay in the lead roles. Second season of this series titled Nokol Heere released on 2021.

== Plot ==
In this series a professor of history; a computer hacker – Damayanti married to a lovable husband Samaresh. Damayanti's passion lies in cracking psychological mysteries. They move to Santiniketan for an outing and stay in the Guest house of Mr.Roy. Damayanti observes that something unusual is happening in the Roy family. She starts the investigation on her own. Samaresh's friend Shiben, a police officer helps Damayanti.

== Cast ==
- Tuhina Das as Damayanti Dutta Gupta
- Amrita Chattopadhyay as Sarmishtha
- Indrasish Roy as Samaresh Dutta Gupta
- Soumya Banerjee as Siben Sen
- Chandrayee Ghosh as Munia Roy (in Season 1)
- Amrita Chattopadhyay as Sarmishtha Roy (in Season 1)
- Gautam Purkayastha (in Season 1)
- Arpan Ghoshal (in Season 1)
- Rajnandini Paul (in Nokol Heere)
- Anindita Raychaudhary (in Nokol Heere)
- Sujoy Prasad Chatterjee as Ramanuj (in Nokol Heere)
- Atmadeep Ghosh (in Nokol Heere)
- Sudip Sarkar (in Nokol Heere)
- Biswajit Chakraborty as Mr. Mitra (in Nokol Heere)
- Yash Barma as Sudipto

== Overview ==
Series	Episodes	Originally released
1	7	22 October 2020
2	7	12 March 2021

=== Season 1 (2020) ===
On 6 October 2020, Hoichoi released the official teaser of the series. On 11 October Hoichoi also released the title track of the series. The season started streaming from 22 October 2020. On 29 October 2020 hoichoi released all the remaining episodes on their platform.

=== Nokol Heere (2021) ===
On 12 March 2021, Hoichoi released the second season of Damayanti, titled Nokol Heere.

== Episodes ==
=== Season 1 ===
No.	Title	Directed by	Original release date
1	"Rahasya Sandhani"	Aritra Sen, Rohan Ghose	22 October 2020
2	"Bipod Sonket"	Aritra Sen, Rohan Ghose	22 October 2020
3	"Abhisar"	Aritra Sen, Rohan Ghose	22 October 2020
4	"Sholo Kola"	Aritra Sen, Rohan Ghose	22 October 2020
5	"Bonhi Potongo"	Aritra Sen, Rohan Ghose	29 October 2020
6	"Jobonika"	Aritra Sen, Rohan Ghose	29 October 2020
7	"Unmochon"	Aritra Sen, Rohan Ghose	29 October 2020

=== Nokol Heere ===
No.	Title	Directed by	Original release date
1	"Pratyabartan"	Aritra Sen, Rohan Ghose	12 March 2021
2	"Itibritto"	Aritra Sen, Rohan Ghose	12 March 2021
3	"Nibhrite"	Aritra Sen, Rohan Ghose	12 March 2021
4	"Phire Dekha"	Aritra Sen, Rohan Ghose	12 March 2021
5	"Somikoron"	Aritra Sen, Rohan Ghose	12 March 2021
6	"Bishbrikkho"	Aritra Sen, Rohan Ghose	12 March 2021
7	"Kistimat"	Aritra Sen, Rohan Ghose	12 March 2021
