= Yahhve Sharma =

Indian Actress

- Born: Anjali Sharma; 7 October 2000 (age 25); Mumbai, Maharashtra
- Occupation: Actress
- Years active: 2020–present

Yahhve Sharma (born 7 October 2000), formerly known as Anjali Sharma, is an Indian actress from Delhi, best known for her role in the film Operation Mayfair.

Yahhve was seen with AB Rockstar for the music video "Sajna". She was also seen in devotional music video Pawan Bhakti De De Ram sung by singer Sonu Nigam and released by Tips Music. She is recently seen in the film Son directed by Paul Rupesh opposite actor Rajpal Yadav. She also modeled at the Bombay Times Fashion Week in 2023.

Yahhve Sharma raised her voice during a theatre show in support of justice, equality, and freedom for the Palestinian people.

Yahhve was also featured in Women Fitness India January Digital edition.

== Personal life ==
Yahhve Sharma was born on 7 October 2000 as Anjali Sharma in Nagpur, Maharashtra into a Hindu family. She has received formal acting training from the National School of Drama in Delhi. She has a graduate degree in fashion design from Pearl Academy.

In 2024, she changed her name from Anjali Sharma to Yahhve Sharma on advice of actor Nawazuddin Siddiqui's advice.

== Filmography ==
Key
†	Denotes films that have not yet been released

Films
Year	Title	Notes	Ref.
2023	Operation Mayfair	Lead	
2023	Son	Lead	
2025	Section 108 †		

Music videos
Year	Title	Ref.
2023	Sajna	
2023	Pawan Bhakti De De Ram	

Web series
Year	Title	Role	Ref.
2025	Chhal Kapat	Shalu Salwi	
