= Jiyo Kaka =

2011 Indian Bengali film

- Release poster
- Directed by: Parambrata Chatterjee
- Screenplay by: Parambrata Chattopadhyay; Aditi Majumdar
- Story by: Rudranil Ghosh
- Dialogues by: Aditi Majumdar
- Produced by: Vinayak Sarkar
- Starring: Rudranil Ghosh; Saswata Chattopadhyay
- Cinematography: Soumik Haldar
- Edited by: Sujoy Dutta Ray
- Music by: Neel Dutt; Rupam Islam; Chandrabindoo
- Production company: T. Sarkar Productions Pvt. Ltd.
- Distributed by: Surinder Films
- Release date: 11 February 2011
- Running time: 130 minutes
- Country: India
- Language: Bengali
- Budget: ₹7 million (US$83,000)

Jiyo Kaka (Bengali: জিয়ো কাকা) is a 2011 Indian Bengali comedy film directed by actor Parambrata Chattopadhyay, making his directional debut.

== Cast ==
- Abhiraj
- Rahul
- Saswata Chattopadhyay
- Koushik Ganguly
- Rituparna Sengupta
- Rudranil Ghosh
- Rana Basu Thakur
- Anindya Ghosh

== Soundtrack ==
The Jiyo Kaka soundtrack's music directors are Neel Dutt, Rupam Islam, Chandrabindoo with lyrics penned by Srijato.

Tracklist
No.	Title	Singer(s)	Length
1.	"Aamader Kolkatay"	Rupam Islam
2.	"Jiyo Kaka (Title Song)"	Anindya Chatterjee, Arko mukhaerjee
3.	"Mon Kharape Diyechhi Mishel"	Neel Dutt
4.	"Phirchhi Ektu Derite"	Sayantan
5.	"Nodi Bhora Dheu"	Arko Mukhaerjee
6.	"Nodi Bhora Dheu (Remix)"	Armeen Musa

== Reception ==
=== Critical reception ===
A critic from The Times of India rated the film 3.5/5 stars and wrote "For those interested in simple and pretensionless cinema, the film could make for a decent watch."
