= Killbill Society =

2025 Indian Bengali film by Srijit Mukherjee

- Theatrical Release Poster
- Directed by: Srijit Mukherji
- Written by: Srijit Mukherji
- Produced by: Shrikant Mohta; Mahendra Soni
- Starring: Parambrata Chatterjee; Koushani Mukherjee; Biswanath Basu; Sandipta Sen; Anindya Chatterjee; Tulika Basu; Kiran Dutta
- Cinematography: Indranath Marick
- Edited by: Sanglap Bhowmick
- Music by: Songs: Anupam Roy Ranajoy Bhattacharya Tamalika Golder; Background score: Indraadip Dasgupta
- Production company: Shree Venkatesh Films
- Distributed by: Shree Venkatesh Films
- Release date: 11 April 2025
- Running time: 135 minutes
- Country: India
- Language: Bengali
- Box office: est. ₹7.56 crore

Killbill Society: Amader Kono Shakha Nei (transl. Killbill Society: We have no branches) is a 2025 Indian Bengali-language black comedy romantic thriller film written and directed by Srijit Mukherji. Produced by Shrikant Mohta and Mahendra Soni under the banner of Shree Venkatesh Films, the film is a legacy sequel to Mukherji's film Hemlock Society (2012). It stars Parambrata Chatterjee and Koushani Mukherjee in lead roles, while Biswanath Basu, Sandipta Sen and Anindya Chatterjee play other pivotal roles.

Inspired by a real-life incident involving Angelina Jolie, the film revolves around an aspiring actress Poorna, who hires Ananda Kar of Hemlock Society, now a contract killer, to kill herself. The film was announced in February 2025, also commencing its principal photography the same month. It marks the eighth collaboration between Mukherji and Chatterjee. Music of the film is composed by Anupam Roy, Ranajoy Bhattacharjee and Tamalika Golder, while Indraadip Dasgupta provides its score. Indranath Marick handled the cinematography and Sanglap Bhowmick edited the film.

Killbill Society was theatrically released on 11 April 2025, coinciding with Pohela Baishakh. The film, like its predecessor, became a box-office success, though it received lukewarm reception from critics. Nevertheless, the soundtrack turned out to be a chartbuster for both critics and audience alike.

== Premise ==
Set more than twelve years after the events of Hemlock Society, the narrative follows Poorna Aich, a rising actress and digital influencer whose life is derailed when an intimate recording is disseminated online by her abusive partner. This breach of privacy becomes a sensationalized subject for media debate, leading to a fractured relationship with her mother and compounding the grief of her father’s paralysis. In her despair, she seeks an unconventional exit by consulting a colorful gangster, Petkata Shaw, who directs her to his premier assassin, Ontorip Karmakar—also known as Mrityunjoy Kar.

It is revealed that Mrityunjoy (a play on words suggesting the "enjoyment of death") is actually Ananda Kar, now a middle-aged man bearing the physical and emotional marks of time. Claiming to have shuttered the Hemlock Society in favor of a contract-killing organization titled the "Killbill Society," Kar subjects Poorna to a series of witty, musical, and philosophical dialogues centered on feminism and the human experience. To challenge her commitment to dying, he even presents a staged livestream of a purported execution.

The narrative progresses through a series of deliberately failed assassination attempts, including the use of an unloaded firearm and the serving of a pizza allegedly laced with potassium ferrocyanide. Following these events, Poorna is hospitalized, where an emotional exchange with her sister, Sunayna, forces her to recognize the enduring support of her community. This moment of clarity reveals Ananda's elaborate deception: he had never abandoned his original mission. It is disclosed that Ananda had utilized a junior actor for the livestream and had integrated a guilt-ridden, suicidal Ontorip into the Hemlock Society, all while manipulating Poorna’s circumstances to rekindle her desire for life.

The two develop a deep romantic bond, and despite Ananda entering the terminal stages of lymphocytopenia, Poorna marries him shortly before his transition. This union provides her with a fortified resolve to live, while poetic justice is served as Petkata Shaw coerces her former abuser into funding her father’s medical care.

The film concludes two years later, depicting a restored Poorna who has reclaimed her professional standing. Having inherited the leadership of the Hemlock Society, she honors her late husband’s memory by utilizing her understanding of mortality to guide another disillusioned individual back to the pursuit of life.

== Cast ==
- Parambrata Chatterjee as Mrityunjoy Kar / Ananda Kar
- Koushani Mukherjee as Poorna "Pu" Aich
  - Nidhi Mahato as Young Poorna
- Biswanath Basu as Petkata Shaw
- Sandipta Sen as Sunayna "Babi" Aich, Poorna's Elder Sister
- Anindya Chatterjee as Poorna's ex-boyfriend
- Arijita Mukhopadhyay as Shrishti, Poorna's PA
- Tulika Basu as Poorna's mother
- Mousumi Saha
- Soumen Chakraborty as Ontorip Karmakar

=== Special appearances ===
- Ankush Hazra as himself
- Ananya Chatterjee as herself
- Shruti Das as herself
- Angana Roy as herself
- Somak Ghosh as host of award show name undisclosed
- Nilanjana Banerjee
- Dr. Kunal Sarkar as himself
- Bhaswati Ghosh as herself
- Roshni Bhattacharya as herself
- Shatarup Ghosh as himself
- Kiran Dutta as himself

== Production ==
=== Announcement ===
The film was announced on 2 February 2025, on the occasion of Saraswati Puja by Shree Venkatesh Films. Marking the sequel after 13 years of Hemlock Society, the announcement poster revealed the lead cast of Parambrata Chatterjee and Koushani Mukherjee, along with the name of the music directors - Anupam Roy, Ranajoy Bhattacharjee and Tamalika Golder. The release date was announced with another poster on 28 February 2025, as a part of SVF's new slate announcement event "Golper Parbon 1432".

=== Development ===
Mukherji has drawn inspiration from a shocking real-life incident involving Hollywood star Angelina Jolie. The core concept of the film will be centered around Jolie's interview in which she mentioned that instead of attempting a suicide, she hired a gunman to kill her. It would have saved her family from any kind of guilt. But the shooter gave her time to rethink her decision and eventually, she changed her opinion and decided to not die.

The first look of the principal characters were revealed on 13 March 2025. A character intro of Mrityunjoy Kar, the protagonist, was released on 15 March 2025. The first character poster was dropped on 21 March 2025. Srijit Mukherjee revealed that he fixed the title of the film based on the idea that there are people who "kill" and then raise a "bill". A reference to paid killing, hence the title was kept "Killbill Society". Parambrata's bald look was finalised in order to maintain continuance with Hemlock Society, in which he was affected with a deadly disease and was losing hair. That disease has exemplified over the years and now he has gone bald in Killbill Society.

=== Casting ===
The director Srijit Mukherji initially wanted to re-cast the lead pair of Parambrata Chatterjee and Koel Mallick from Hemlock Society. Since Koel had become mother for the second time recently, Srijit Mukherjee had to find a new face to cast opposite Parambrata. First the role was offered to Mimi Chakraborty. Reports suggest that she agreed for the role but came off the board as she had issue with a kissing scene in the movie. Then the role went to Koushani Mukherjee and she was finalised. Although the director later mentioned in an interview that Koushani was his first choice for the film. Anindya Chatterjee joined the cast in January 2025, marking his collaboration with Mukherji, 11 years after Chotushkone.

On 27 March 2025, the makers revealed that the film will have a number of cameo appearances including Ankush Hazra, Ananya Chatterjee, Shruti Das, Angana Roy, Somak Ghosh and Roshni Bhattacharya, thus carrying forward the style of its predecessor Hemlock Society. Ankush Hazra will make his cameo in a song sequence in the film.

=== Filming ===
Filming started from 6 February 2025. It was completely shot in West Bengal, particularly in Kolkata and North Bengal. Major parts of the film has been filmed around the Victoria Memorial, Vidyasagar Setu, Lower Circular Road cemetery, Prinsep Ghat and the banks of Teesta River. Koushani revealed in an interview that it was very difficult to please Mukherjee with one shot. Being strict with precision to minute details, he took multiple retakes and didn't proceed unless a scene seemed perfect to him. So, the cast and crew could get only 9 hours of sleep amid a continuous 60 hours schedule from 14 February to 18 February 2025.

Koushani said in an interview that she resorted to revisiting the painful memories of her mother's death, in order to express raw grief and emotions in the film. She used Stanislavski's recall technique, where the actor recalls the most emotionally taxing moment in their life, to portray deep grief. Parambrata revealed in an interview that Srijit Mukherjee asked him to give him a long and suitable date, during which he will not be committed to any other film. Primarily because he would be showcasing a bald look in the film. Since Koushani was nervous regarding a kissing scene in the film with Parambrata, the director undertook the shot in a single take. The scene was shot under the supervision of an intimacy coordinator hired from Mumbai.

== Music ==
The album contains songs composed by Anupam Roy, Ranajoy Bhattacharjee and Tamalika Golder while the background score is composed by Indraadip Dasgupta. Roy, a regular collaborator of Mukherji, reunites with him after Dawshom Awbotaar (2023). Bhattacharjee reunites with Mukherji after Tekka (2024). Golder reunites with Mukherji after Durgo Rahasya series.

The film has the first ever duet of eminent singers Rupam Islam and Sidhu. The film's trailer features a "sad version" of the song "Ekhon Onek Raat" from Hemlock Society (2012).

The first song "Nei Tumi Aager Moto" was released on 19 March 2025. The second single "Bhalobeshey Basho Naa" was released on 25 March 2025. The third song "Shondhe Naamey" was released on 29 March 2025. The fourth song "Refereer Bnaashi" was released on 8 April 2025.

The full album was released on 29 March 2025. The music launch event was held at India's tallest watch tower in Belilious Park, Howrah and the event was marked by performances from the music team in the film including Anupam Roy, Somlata Acharyya Chowdhury, Tamalika Golder, Ranajoy Bhattacharjee and Rapurna Bhattacharyya.

== Marketing ==
As a part of the marketing campaign, the makers attached posters throughout Kolkata titled "Ashohay lagche?" (transl. Are you feeling lonely?). If yes, then a contact of "Mritunjoy Kar", the protagonist of the film, was provided at the bottom of the poster. Upon texting, everyone received a pre programmed reply "I am Mrityunjoy Kar, here to help. If you want to know how, visit your nearest cinema hall on April 11." This move was criticised for being insensitive towards people fighting with mental health issues and depression.

The trailer was released on 1 April 2025 at AMPM, Kolkata. The trailer launch event was also marked by celebrations of Srijit Mukherjee's 15 years in the film industry since his debut through Autograph in 2010. The special screening was held on 10 April 2025.

== Release ==
=== Theatrical ===
The film released in theatres on 11 April 2025 at 58 cinemas with 106 shows.

=== Home media ===
The movie is set to stream online on the Bengali language OTT platform "Hoichoi" on 13 June 2025.

== Reception ==
=== Critical reception ===
Subhasmita Kanji of Hindustan Times rated the film 4.2/5 stars and wrote "Killbill Society is not a film, its a love ballad by Srijit Mukherjee which explains that the obstacles in a relationship don't have more importance than a person's life. Dialogues and references are the USP of the film." She praised the acting of the principal cast, Parambrata and Koushani's chemistry and Biswanath's comedy but bemoaned the excessive length and presence of too many songs. Amay Deb Roy of Anandabazar Patrika rated the film 8/10 stars and noted "The film is lined with Srijit's smartness, catchy dialogues and emotional music but the twist could have been better as it was predictable."

Agnivo Niyogi of The Telegraph reviewed the film and opined "Killbill Society is a love story — not between two people, but between a person and the idea of hope. The screenplay swings between the poetic and the pedantic. At times, the film loses itself in its own wordplay, occasionally stumbling under the weight of its own philosophy. It leans a bit too heavily on Srijit's blend of clever dialogue and visual symbolism. The film delivers the quiet, persistent belief that even in our most broken moments, we are worthy of second chances." He praised the cinematography, songs and Parambrata's seasoned acting. Subhash K Jha of The Statesman rated the film 3.5/5 stars and wrote "It’s not easy to smile in the face of death. Kill Bill Society does it with a disarming fluency."

Sandipta Bhanja of Sangbad Pratidin termed the film as "Srijit Mukherji's most personal film till date" and highlighted "The film not deals with murder or serial killing. It delivers the message of eternal love. The love which doesn't fade away or break due owing to small misunderstandings. The film aptly deals with numerous present day issues with melodious songs in between." Bhaswati Ghosh of TV9 Bangla rated the film 3.5/5 stars and wrote "Killbill Society is not a complex story but an ode to the romance which encompasses both the past and the present. It gives a message that life is above romance. Every dialogue in the film speaks of Srijit's signature style." She praised Anindya and Biswanath's performances besides applauding the songs.

Arkapravo Das of The Times of India rated the film 3/5 stars and noted "Themes of life, death, lost love and second chances abound in Mukherji’s sequel. The first half of the film is burdened by one-liners and puns that masquerade as dialogue, and the self-indulgence is on full display with inside jokes and repeated references to the Tollywood industry – amusing in parts, exasperating, at a point. Pro-life and overall, a positive, pro-feminist package that’s relevant in these times of broader mental health awareness, Killbill Society has its moments – making it a great festive weekend watch, especially because of its very hummable soundtrack."

== Controversy ==
As a part of the marketing campaign, the producers attached posters throughout Kolkata for persons seeking assistance for their mental health if they are feeling lonely. As part of the fictional scenario, a contact number belonging to Mritunjoy Kar, the protagonist of the film, was provided on the poster. On texting the number on WhatsApp for seeking medical help, everyone received a pre programmed reply "I am Mrityunjoy Kar, here to help. If you want to know how, visit your nearest cinema hall on April 11."

Although a link to a proper mental health counselling organization was also provided in the text, this move was widely criticized by the people for being insensitive. People criticized the film for gimmicking a serious issue like depression and mental health and held the director responsible for an answer. In a reply, the director said that it was done by the marketing team of the producers and he was not the correct person to answer.
