= Hawa Bodol =

2013 film by Parambrata Chatterjee

- হাওয়া বদল
- Directed by: Parambrata Chatterjee
- Written by: Anindya Bose
- Screenplay by: Anindya Bose; Parambrata Chatterjee
- Based on: The Change-Up by Jon Lucas and Scott Moore
- Produced by: RTC Entertainment
- Starring: Parambrata Chatterjee; Raima Sen; Rudranil Ghosh; Neha Panda
- Cinematography: Supriyo Dutta
- Edited by: Sujay Dutta Roy
- Music by: Indradeep Dasgupta
- Production company: Workshop Productions Pvt. Ltd.
- Release date: 22 March 2013 (Kolkata)
- Running time: 150 minutes
- Country: India
- Language: Bengali
- Budget: ₹10 million (US$100,000)
- Box office: ₹20 million (US$210,000)

Hawa Bodol is a 2013 Indian Bengali comedy film directed by Parambrata Chattopadhyay. The film revolves around two childhood friends, who met coincidentally after a long time, and somehow their lives swapped after a night of endless drinks. The movie is a remake of the 2011 American film The Change-Up. A sequel titled Abar Hawa Bodol released in 2026.

== Plot ==
The movie revolves around two old school friends, Satrajeet aka Jeet (Parambrata Chattopadhyay) and Rajarshi aka Raj (Rudranil Ghosh), who coincidentally came across each after a long time ago. While Jeet, a partner in a big architect firm, which he inherited from his deceased father-in-law; Raj is a struggling singer in a band. Jeet and Raj were invited to a party of a non-Bengali business client of Jeet, where Raj flirted with the businessman's daughter Inka (Neha Panda). After the party, the friends bought drinks from closed shops and drank in the open. Both of them wished they had each other's life. After getting up from sleep, both of them found that their soul had interchanged. The friends were surprised to find themselves in that situation. While both of them tried to be loyal, they found it difficult to live in each other's life. In the meantime, Raj (in Jeet's body) visited Chandannagar, his home town to meet his parents, which he left years ago to make a career in singing. Even Jeet (in Raj's body) came to visit his house to see his child. Inka came to stay with Raj (actually Jeet's soul) after she had a fight with her parents. The friends tried to manage each other's work. While Raj gave an interesting solution of using terracotta in bathroom instead of gold plates to the Indonesian clients. Jeet, on the other hand introduced Inka as a lead singer in their band, whose performance was well appreciated. The two friends decided to get back to each other's life; they repeated the same acts they did on the day they interchanged and were successful in getting back their souls in their own body. The movie ended with Raj going on a trip to Chandannagar to visit his parents, and Jeet going on a family trip.

== Cast ==
- Raima Sen as Tanuka
- Parambrata Chattopadhyay as Jeet
- Rudranil Ghosh as Raj
- Neha Panda as Inka
- Dwijen Bandopadhyay
- Kaushik Ganguly as music producer

== Reception ==
The movie opened to mixed reviews and had a good run of 5 weeks collecting 16 million in week one. The movie collected 5 million in week 2 and the total box office collection after five weeks was 20 million.

== Soundtrack ==
The Hawa Bodol soundtrack's music director is Indradeep Dasgupta with lyrics penned by Angshuman Chakraborty & Prosen. One of Rabindranath Tagore's songs ("Mor Bhabonare") is also included in this soundtrack.

Tracklist
No.	Title	Singer(s)	Length
1.	"Ghore Pherar Gaan"	Vishal Dadlani	03:52
2.	"Din Khon Mapa Ache"	Arijit Singh	05:32
3.	"Mor Bhabonare (Duet)"	Saptarshi Mukherjee and Sahana Bajpaie	04:07
4.	"Bhoy Dekhas Na Please (Female)"	Sunidhi Chauhan	06:50
5.	"Mone Porle"	Arijit Singh	06:12
6.	"Bhoy Dekhas Na (The Agnee Version)"	Mohan Kannan	06:12
7.	"Mor Bhabonare (Female)"	Sahana Bajpaie	04:07
8.	"Mor Bhabonare (Male)"	Saptarshi Mukherjee	04:07
9.	"Bhoy Dekhas Na (Male) –"	Arijit Singh	06:32
Total length:			47:31
