= Ektu Sore Bosun =

2023 Indian Bengali film

- Theatrical release poster
- Directed by: Kamaleshwar Mukherjee
- Screenplay by: Kamaleshwar Mukherjee
- Based on: Pasha Pashi of novelist Banaphul
- Produced by: Anindya Dasgupta
- Starring: Ritwik Chakraborty; Paoli Dam; Paran Bandopadhyay; Ishaa Saha; Payel Sarkar; Rajatava Dutta; Kharaj Mukherjee
- Cinematography: Saurav Banerjee
- Edited by: Arghyakamal Mitra
- Release date: 24 November 2023
- Running time: 2 hr 25 min
- Country: India
- Language: Bengali

Ektu Sore Bosun is a Bengali-language comedy-drama film directed by Kamaleshwar Mukherjee and produced by Anindya Dasgupta. This film is based on a short story Pasha Pashi by novelist Balaichand Mukhopadhyay. It was released on 24 November 2023 under the banner of Big Cat Films.

== Plot ==
Guddu, a young Sanskrit graduate come from Begunbagicha village to Kolkata for a job. His love interest Piu and other family members also come there to keep an eye on him. Guddu becomes a hero because he accidentally does few brave act. It creates a series of funny incidents.

== Cast ==
- Ritwik Chakraborty as Guddu
- Paoli Dam as Rokeya
- Paran Bandyopadhyay as Pranonath
- Ishaa Saha as Piu
- Payel Sarkar as Urmi
- Rajatava Dutta as Sphatik
- Kharaj Mukherjee as Jogen
- Biswanath Basu as Bala Charan
- Manasi Sinha as Mahima
- Parthsarathi Chakraborty as Alpin
- Debapratim Dasgupta as Chatradhar
- Debaprosad Halder as Haldar as Shashadhar
- Moumita Pandit as Pragya
- Poushali Bhattacharjee as Mrinalini
- Purbasha Mal as Nisha
- Joysree Dasgupta
- Bhaskar Mukherjee
- Raajhorshee De

== Reception ==
Poorna Banerjee of The Times of India rated the film 3 out of 5 stars and wrote " Throughout the film, the dialogues deliver satiric commentaries relevant to the current political and social scenario. Although there are some loose ends and some characters appear without any proper context, the film is ought to give some food for thought." Randeep Naskar of Ei Samay wrote "The film felt like a fresh air in the landscape of Bengali cinema. Although it seems unnecessarily extended and some scenes don't appear to be connected well, the acting and director's vision has successfully created a scenario of today's society." Akash Misra of Sangbad Pratidin rated the film 3 out of 5 stars and wrote " The apt acting of the cast combined with the background score, songs and comedic dialogues has made this nonsense humorous film to be sensible.'
