= Parambrata Chattopadhyay =

Indian actor (born 1980)

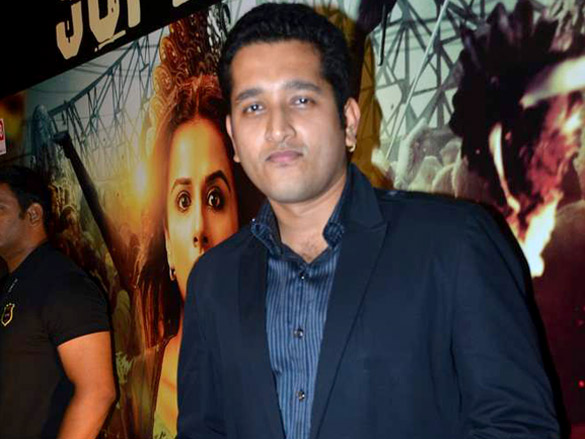
- Chattopadhyay at Kahaani success meet
- Pronunciation: [pɔɾombɾot̪o t͡ʃɔʈːopad̪ʱːae̯]
- Born: 27 June 1980 (age 46); Kolkata, West Bengal, India
- Education: Jadavpur University (BA); University of Bristol (MA)
- Occupations: Actor; director
- Years active: 2002–present
- Works: Filmography
- Spouse: Piya Chakraborty (m. 2023)
- Children: 1 child
- Relatives: Ritwik Ghatak (maternal great uncle) Mahasweta Devi (aunt); Gita Ghatak (aunt by marriage)

Parambrata Chattopadhyay (Note: Bengali pronunciation: [pɔɾombɾot̪o t͡ʃɔʈːopad̪ʱːae̯].) (Bengali pronunciation: [pɔɾombɾot̪o t͡ʃɔʈːopad̪ʱːae̯]; born 27 June 1980) is an Indian actor and director. Parambrata started his career with Bengali television and films. He has acted as the fictional character Topshe from Feluda under Sandip Ray's direction. His notable works include Bhalo Theko (2003), Baishe Srabon (2011), Bhooter Bhabishyat (2012), Sold (2014), Kadambari (2017), Anukul (2017), Pari (2018), Ramprasad Ki Tehrvi (2019), Dwitiyo Purush (2020), Bulbbul (2020) and Doctor Bakshi (2023). He made his Hindi debut in Kahaani (2012), starring with Vidya Balan and Nawazuddin Siddiqui.

== Personal life ==
Parambrata was born in Kolkata, West Bengal, India. He is the son of Satinath Chattopadhyay, a journalist, and Sunetra Ghatak, a renowned film critic; maternal grandson of Ashish Chandra Ghatak and Indira Ghatak, and grandnephew of filmmaker Ritwik Ghatak. Bengali author and activist Mahasweta Devi is Parambrata's aunt. He has often been targeted by hindutva activists for his views. He was previously in a relationship with actress Swastika Mukherjee, and also with Ike Schouten, a doctor from The Netherlands, for nearly a decade. Parambrata studied at Patha Bhavan School, Kolkata. He holds a bachelor's degree in English literature from Jadavpur University. He also obtained a master's degree in Film and Television from the University of Bristol.

On 27 November 2023, he married Piya Chakraborty, a singer-social worker in a private ceremony. On 1 June 2025, they had a baby boy.

== Career ==
Chattopadhyay has acted in many television series, tele-films, short films and films. His directorial debut feature film is Jiyo Kaka (2011) starring Rituparna Sengupta and Rudranil Ghosh. His second directorial venture was Hawa Bodol (2013). Seven months after the success of Kahaani, he was signed by Jeffrey D. Brown, who won an Academy Award for his debut short film in 1986, for his film Sold.

On 30 May 2011, he became a producer along with colleague, Rudranil Ghosh, by launching their own production house, Workshop Productions Pvt. Ltd, in association with Dipak Raha of Durgandh Group.

Along with his business partner Aritra Sen, he currently runs their production house Roadshow Films.

For the movie Abhijaan Poulami Bose accused director Parambrata of blatant misrepresentations of original events, ignoring important people and aspects of his life and using her son's accident in the film. Parambrata said the depictions were endorsed by the actor himself.

== Criminal Case ==
In May 2026, an FIR was registered against Chattopadhyay and actor Swastika Mukherjee at Gariahat police station in Kolkata about their social media posts on May 2, 2021, immediately after TMC’s victory in the then Assembly elections instigated political violence against BJP workers in the state. The FIR registered by an advocate claims that at around 4 pm on May 4, Chattopadhyay made a post in Bengali, which meant- “Let today be declared World ‘Rogorani’ thrashing Day!”), to which Swastika Mukherjee responded with an emoji, saying “Hahahah Hok Hok”, which added to the fury.

Swastika has already appeared before the police and her statement was recorded by the Investigating Officer, while Chattopadhyay has moved to Calcutta High Court with a prayer to quash the FIR registered against him.

Meanwhile Chattopadhyay's wife Piya has called it a ridiculous allegation.

== Footnotes ==
Awards and achievements
BFJA Awards
Preceded by Silajit Majumder for Mahulbanir Sereng	Most Promising Actor Award for Nishi Japan; 2006	Succeeded by Rishi Kaushik for Kranti
