= Accident (2012 film) =

2012 Indian Bengali film

- Accident Bengali film poster
- Directed by: Nandita Roy; Shiboprosad Mukherjee
- Produced by: Kaustuv Ray
- Starring: Rudranil Ghosh; Shiboprosad Mukherjee; Sabyasachi Chakrabarty; Sampurna Lahiri; Kanchan Mullick; Kharaj Mukherjee; Debshankar Haldar
- Cinematography: Anil Singh
- Edited by: Malay Laha
- Music by: Joy Sarkar
- Release date: 27 September 2012 (Kolkata)
- Running time: 129 minutes
- Country: India
- Language: Bengali

Accident is a 2012 Bengali drama film directed by Nandita Roy & Shiboprosad Mukherjee. The story of the film deals with road accident and its consequences in Kolkata. The director duo got motivated by Keshtopur road incident in April 2008 where at least 20 people were killed and nearly 40 were injured.

== Plot synopsis ==
Arko, an aspiring bowler, wants to pursue his career in cricket. However, a torn ligament puts an end to his dreams. He tries his luck in various other jobs, but all in vain. Frustration and depression continue to take a toll on him. Then, suddenly, life starts lighting up after the birth of his son, Babai. While Arko stays at home and takes care of Babai, his wife, Riya, goes out to work. On the other hand, Kartik Mondol is a poor bus driver, who lives in a slum with his mother and wife and drives the buses owned by Madan Patra. Then, there is Swapan Chakraborty, an honest insurance investigator, who lives with his daughter and specially abled father. One morning, while Babai is going to school, he gets involved in an accident. Kartik's bus runs over little Babai, killing him. Arko's life is shattered. Though Kartik is arrested, he is made a scapegoat for the greater negligence by bus owners, the testing centres, and the corporate giant, Axle Motors. Swapan, who takes up the case, finds that the bus itself is a defective model. After obtaining bail, Kartik teams up with Arko and Swapan. Their protest, overcoming all difficulties, constitutes the main plot of the movie.

== Cast ==
- Rudranil Ghosh as Kartik Mondol (Bus driver)
- Shiboprosad Mukherjee as Arko
- Sabyasachi Chakrabarty as Amit Durjari (chairman of Axle Motors)
- Sampurna Lahiri as Riya
- Kanchan Mullick as Makal (bus conductor)
- Debshankar Haldar as Swapan Chakraborty (Insurance Agent)
- Sankarshan Das as Babai (Arko and Riya's son)
- Kanchana Moitra as Rumki (Kartik's wife)
- Kharaj Mukherjee as Madan Patra (Bus Owner)
- Biswanath Basu as Raj Da (bus servicing agent)
- Chitra Sen as Kartik's mother
- Biswajit Chakraborty as Transport Minister
- Dibya Bhattacharya as Swapan's father
- Arindol Bagchi

== Crew ==
- Story, Script, Dialogue & Direction: Nandita Roy & Shiboprosad Mukherjee
- Produced by: Kaustuv Ray
- Presented by: Shibaji Panja
- Lyrics by: Srijato
- Music by: Joy Sarkar

== Music ==
Music
Title	Singer
Dharo Kono Katha Holo Na	Joy Sarkar
Ek Dake Jara Ghar Chari	Nachiketa Chakraborty
Eto Rakam Akash Venge	Timir Biswas
Hawa Lege Venge Galo Ghar	Raghav
Jaane Jaan	Anweshaa
Mono Re Koto Lokho Janom Ghure Ghure	Anuseh Andil
Uver Take	Silajit Majumder

== Response ==
Accident ran successfully in theatres for 50 days. The film was selected for the Indian Cinema Now section of the 18th International Kerala Film Festival. Later in 2012, Joy Sarkar won the Best Singer award for the soundtrack 'Janejaan' from this film at the Radio Mirchi Awards.

== See also ==
- Muktodhara
- Icche
- Ramdhanu
- Alik Sukh
