= Gotro =

2019 Indian Bengali drama film

- Film poster
- Directed by: Nandita Roy; Shiboprosad Mukherjee
- Written by: Shiboprosad Mukherjee; Nandita Roy
- Screenplay by: Nandita Roy
- Produced by: Nandita Roy; Shiboprosad Mukherjee
- Starring: Anashua Majumdar; Nigel Akkara; Manali Dey; Ambarish Bhattacharya; Saheb Chatterjee; Badshah Moitra
- Cinematography: Supriyo Dutta
- Edited by: Moloy Laha
- Music by: Anindya Chatterjee
- Production company: Windows Production
- Release date: 23 August 2019
- Running time: 141 minutes
- Country: India
- Language: Bengali
- Box office: est. ₹5 crore

Gotro (transl. Clan) is a 2019 Indian Bengali-language emotional family action drama film, directed, produced and co-written by Nandita Roy and Shiboprosad Mukherjee. It stars Anashua Majumdar, Nigel Akkara and Manali Dey, with Ambarish Bhattacharya, Saheb Chatterjee and Badshah Moitra. The film revolves around the relationship between Mukti Debi (Majumdar), a widow who lives alone in her mansion (her son being settled abroad), with her caretaker Tareq (Akkara), an ex-convict and shows how their lives undergo a change.

The story for Gotro was conceived by Roy, when she learned about the relationship between Mukherjee's mother and her caretaker. Roy eventually wrote the film's screenplay, while she and Mukherjee co-wrote the story. This marked their second film after Icche (2011), focusing on mother-son relationship. Supriyo Dutta handled the cinematography while Moloy Laha edited the film. Anindya Chatterjee composed the film's soundtrack, which received favourable reviews on release.

Gotro was released on 23 August 2019. It received mixed to positive reviews from critics. Majumdar's performance won high appraisals; criticism was however, drawn towards Akkara's performance. Nevertheless, the film was a commercial success, grossing ₹50 million (US$520,000) in its theatrical run. The soundtrack album of the film was highly successful. At the 4th Filmfare Awards Bangla, it received three nominations under Best Male Playback and Best Female Playback categories, but did not win any.

== Synopsis ==
Gotro is a story of faith, love and belief, revolving around Mukti Debi, an educated Bengali Hindu woman, who lives in an old-world mansion in North Kolkata named Gobinda Dham while her son, Anirban, is settled abroad with his family. Tareq Ali is a former Odiya Muslim convict who is now trying to redeem himself and restart his life. He is employed by Anirban as the caretaker of his mother and her estate. What follows is a tale of how a mother-son relationship begins to build between Mukti Debi and Tareq, while the former is unaware of his Muslim identity, depicting the underlying social issues of the era like ghettoisation & securitisation of Muslims in the background of the rise of Hindutva in West Bengal since 2019 & of cultural barriers. Mukti Debi and Tareq discover the meaning of life as they unfold love for each other and she started loving her as her own son. Gotro is a sweet take on the mother-son relationship with a message of communal harmony.

== Cast ==
- Anashua Majumdar as Mukti Debi
- Nigel Akkara as Tareq Ali/Tarak Guha
- Ambarish Bhattacharya as Mukti Debi's family priest
- Saheb Chatterjee as Mukti Debi's son, Anirban
- Manali Dey as Jhuma, the daughter of Mukti Debi's cook
- Badshah Moitra as Police Inspector Ritam, Anirban's friend
- Kharaj Mukherjee as Bapi, a local politician
- Biswanath Basu in a special appearance in "Mashima Hitler" song
- Santu Mukhopadhyay as Sajal Da
- Devlina Kumar and Om Sahani in a special appearance in "Rongoboti" song
- Aditi Munshi in a special appearance in “Srikrishno Kirton”

== Production ==
According to Mukherjee, long ago, Nigel Akkara had sent a young boy to his home at Baranagar as they were looking for a caretaker. After some days, the boy informed Mukherjee that he felt he wasn't fit for the job. On being asked why, he replied that Mukherjee's mother had been teaching him the texts of Rabindranath Tagore and he couldn't understand any of those. This formed the core plot for Gotro.

Nandita Roy opted for Anashua Majumdar to pick up the character traits of Mukherjee's mother. Majumdar revealed being moved by the character Mukti Devi; especially when she learned that it had been inspired by Shiboprosad's mother. She also admitted of having some similarities with the character, though she had no belief in caste and creed discrimination. Nigel Akkara, who had gained fame through the film Muktodhara, was signed on for one of the leads. Recalling about his experience, Akkara said that the filming has been one of the best times of his life and he has been inspired by the way people approached him and praised him. Manali Dey was cast as Jhuma; she expressed her excitement on being a part of the film and opined that her character personified a "flying butterfly". Actors Saheb Chatterjee, Kharaj Mukherjee and Tota Roy Chowdhury were signed on for other pivotal roles. Later, Roy Chowdhury, however, was replaced by Badshah Moitra.

During the initial stages of production, Mukherjee and Roy were reluctant to talk about the film's theme and casting; they wanted people to guess it. It marked their second collaboration in 2019 after their recent outing Konttho, released six weeks prior to Gotro. Upon its completion, the film was slated for release on the occasion of Krishna Janmashtami in August 2019. Speaking to The Times of India, Mukherjee addressed the film to be yet "another moving human story" alike their other films. Being based on a social subject (this was consistently reported), the film caused great hype and anticipation in the media even before its release.

== Release and reception ==
Gotro was released on 23 August 2019, coinciding with Janmashtami. Owing to its social theme, the film became one of the rare Bengali films to be released nationwide. It enjoyed full houses for almost all its shows across Bengal, and completed a 100 day run at the Box office. Having opened to a tremendous response in the first week, with its sales improving in the second week, the film emerged a highly successful venture. The subject of the film was seen appealing to people of all ages.

== Soundtrack ==
Gotro

Soundtrack album by Anindya Chatterjee
- Released: 12 July 2019
- Recorded: 2019
- Studios: Studio Vibrations, Kolkata
- Genre: Feature film soundtrack
- Label: Windows

Anindya Chatterjee chronology
Haami (2018)	Gotro (2019)

The soundtrack is composed by Anindya Chatterjee. The song, Rongoboti, is inspired by the famous Odia song by the same name. It received enormous appreciation from the audience. The music album is one of the best in the last five years in terms of song reach, music album and awards. Rongoboti alone has a reach of 160+ million views on YouTube.

Track list
No.	Title	Lyrics	Music	Singer	Length
1.	"Maa"	Anindya Chattopadhyay	Anindya Chatterjee	Arijit Singh	4:20
2.	"Mashima Hitler"	Traditional	Anindya Chatterjee	Babul Supriyo	3:04
3.	"Neel Digante" (Inspired from 'Neel Digante' by Rabindranath Tagore)		Anindya Chatterjee	Shreya Ghoshal	3:43
4.	"Srikrishno Kirton"	Traditional	Traditional	Aditi Munshi	5:11
5.	"Rangabati" (Originally Composition: Prabhudatta Pradhan; Oriya Lyrics: Mitrabhanu Gountia)	Surojit Chatterjee	Surojit Chatterjee	Surojit Chatterjee & Iman Chakraborty	4:19
6.	"Murshid"	Anindya Chatterjee	Anindya Chatterjee	Abhijit Barman	2:54
7.	"Baishnab She Jon"	Narsinh Mehta (Original), Translated by Anindya Chatterjee	Anindya Chatterjee	Shreya Ghoshal	5:50
