= Bohurupi: The Golden Daku =

2026 film by Windows Production

- Poster released on August 4, 2026
- Directed by: Nandita Roy; Shiboprosad Mukherjee
- Written by: Nandita Roy; Shiboprosad Mukherjee
- Produced by: Nandita Roy; Shiboprosad Mukherjee; Sanjay Agarwal
- Starring: Shiboprosad Mukherjee; Jisshu Sengupta; Koushani Mukherjee
- Cinematography: Animesh Ghorui
- Edited by: Malay Laha
- Music by: See below
- Production company: Windows Production
- Distributed by: Windows Production (India); Hombale Films (Overseas)
- Release dates: 15 October 2026 (India); 23 October 2026 (International)
- Running time: 167 minutes
- Country: India
- Language: Bengali
- Box office: ₹6.72 crore

Bohurupi: The Golden Daku (Bengali pronunciation: [boɦurupi]) is a 2026 Bengali-language caper action thriller film written, directed and produced by Nandita Roy and Shiboprosad Mukherjee under the banner of Windows Production. A sequel to the duo's 2024 film Bohurupi, the film stars Shiboprosad himself along with Koushani Mukherjee reprising their roles from the previous instalment, alongside Jisshu Sengupta and Sohini Sarkar in the lead roles.

The film was shot in 96 different locations spanning Murshidabad, Birbhum, and Bardhaman district in West Bengal, with a crew of more than 2,500 artists, marking the biggest project of Windows Production. The film includes folk elements of Bengal and presents rural cultures. Emphasizing the culture of Bengal, it includes showings of folk artists, songs and performances. A teaser for the film revealed Jisshu Sengupta and Mukherjee in a conflict with each other, receiving acclaim.

Shiboprosad Mukherjee and Nandita Roy took the responsibility of making the film by seeing the success of the first film Bohurupi. With shooting having started from April 15, the film marks the association of Jisshu and Mukherjee after 4 years; and Jisshu and Sohini Sarkar's first collaboration. The filming was delayed because of legislative elections, resulting in the shoot having to be done in the hot month of May. A poster showing Bikram Pramanik (Mukherjee) was released in August. 12 days later, a teaser was released, showing the conflict of Pramanik and Sengupta. The music rights to the film were bought by Times Music Bangla five months before the release date. The soundtrack of the film is by Silajit Majumder, Anupam Roy, Arnab Dutta and Noni Chora Das Baul and Bonnie Chakraborty.

== Cast ==
- Shiboprosad Mukherjee as Bikram Pramanik, the dacoit-turned-lawyer
- Jisshu Sengupta as IC Ayan Banerjee
- Koushani Mukherjee as Jhimli Pramanik, an infamous pickpocketer and wife of Bikram Pramanik
- Sohini Sarkar as Reshmi Banerjee, wife of Ayan Bandyopadhyay
- Pradeep Bhattacharya as Khuro, Bikram's partner-in-crime
- Rajatava Dutta as Dhrubo, the owner of Dhrubo Jewellers
- Ambarish Bhattacharya as a police officer
- Chandan Sen
- Rupankar as Chuni Kumar Pramanik, son of Bikram Pramanik and Jhimli Pramanik
- Shantilal Mukherjee as Sanjay Mishra
- Sridip Mukhopadhyay as Jhimli's brother
- Apurba Bar as Khoyer, a member of Pramanik's dacoit gang
- Bharat Kaul
- Rajat Ganguly as Salim Khan, Bikram's cellmate
- Anujoy Chatterjee as a police officer
- Titiksha Das as Payel, Jhimli's sister-in-law
- Koneenica Banerjee as the wife of Dhrubo

=== Cameo appearances ===
- Mithun Chakraborty as leader of Bangla Gang, appearing in the final sequence
- Nani Chora Das Baul as a Bohurupi artist

== Production ==
=== Filming and teaser ===
The success of the 2024 film Bohurupi prompted Mukherjee to handle the responsibility of making a sequel to it. Shiboprosad Mukherjee did not reveal much information regarding the movie. He spoke that there were certain things from Bohurupi loved by the greater audience, such as the celebrations of different people, villages and culture, which would be present in Bohurupi: The Golden Daku. According to him, the film stood as the biggest production of his company Windows, with hardly any filming in Kolkata.

Shiboprosad Mukherjee while sharing details about the movie, said that the scale of the production was truly remarkable. The film was shot in 96 different locations with over 2,500 artists, principal and supporting working on it. The filming was done at multiple places including Hasnabad, Taki, Barasat, Bardhaman, Bolpur, Bishnupur, Malda, and several other locations. A new addition to the film was the addition of Gambhira folk artists from Malda known for their songs and performances. The shooting of the film was delayed because of legislative elections that fell during the filming dates. Mukherjee remarked that it was challenging to shoot the film in the scorching month of May. He gave his role as Bikram Pramanik and put it out as the 25th anniversary of Windows.

Mukherjee made a few remarks about his reunion with Jisshu Sengupta, notably after working together in the films Posto (2017) and Baba Baby O (2022). Sohini Sarkar also joined the film during this time. After appearing together in a few advertisements, Bohurupi: The Golden Daku marks a collaboration of Mukherjee and Sengupta after a 4-year interval. His social media post described the movie's shooting to start from April 15, on the day of Poila Boishakh and be released at the start of Durga Puja. Sohini Sarkar described her working in the film, stating that although she had worked with Windows in advertisements before, she had not done a film with them. Her role in the film marked Sarkar's first time working with Jisshu Sengupta in a film, having collaborated in advertisements before. Though she and the others had talks earlier about a film, Sarkar's first film with both was Bohurupi 2.

Bohurupi: The Golden Daku began its filming on April 15, 2026, on the day of Poila Boishakh. Starring actors like Jisshu Sengupta, Koushani Mukherjee and Pradeep Bhattacharya. The film shot, claimed by The Times of India, began with Sengupta leading the scene, marking a beginning to the film. Nandita Roy expressed happiness to start the shooting on the auspicious day of Poila Boishakh, giving a positive tone to the filming. The story was written by Shiboprosad and Nandita, showing multiple robbery scenes and "a quest for hidden gold". The soundtrack featured artists such as Anupam Roy, Arnab Dutta and Noni Chora Das Baul and Bonnie Chakraborty, featuring a diverse palette of music. The production houses earlier informed of filming in April or March. As a second installment in the Bohurupi franchise, Shiboprosad and Kaushani Mukherjee returned to the sequel, previously gaining fame from the first film. Nandita Roy had planned to bring back the characters Bikram and Jhimli, who were recreated for Bohurupi: The Golden Daku by pulling their basis from Bohurupi. The filming of the movie spanned all over West Bengal and beyond.

Titiksha Das joined the film cast in May 2026, commenting, "Working on the big screen is always a different experience. It is truly a matter of luck that I am working on the big screen with the help of Nanditadi and Shivprasadda, and Windows Production. From the day Shibuda told me that I was part of this project, he did not treat me like a director or producer. He treated me in a way that made my work easier. He did not let me know that this is my first big screen work. I hope there will be many more works with Windows." On May 10, the shooting of the film was underway in Malda, with various scenes of the film shooting seen by the people. Several actors were present in the shooting, including Mukherjee, Abhijit Guha and Pradeep Bhattacharya. Many people present at the time of the filming in Malda captured the scenes and posted on social media, spreading the film's popularity in the media.

The looks and names of characters in the film began to be revealed gradually. On July 23, 2026, Windows Production announced the role and look of Sohini Sarkar. "She was seen in front of the camera wearing a red rose on her hair, light jewelry and with a calm face and curly hair". Her character was named as Reshmi Banerjee, supposed to play the role of Jisshu's wife.

The filmmakers unveiled a poster for the film on August 4, 2026, showing a visual glimpse at the character played by Shiboprosad Mukherjee. It showed Bikram Pramanik, played by Mukherjee in a rugged outfit and appearance. Posting the official poster on Facebook, he captioned it as "Once again, I step into the shoes of Bikram Pramanik. This time, I reprise the character in the second instalment of Bohurupi—Bohurupi: The Golden Daku".

On August 16, 2026, a teaser for the upcoming film was released on YouTube. The teaser showed Jisshu Sengupta's (a police officer) conflict with Mukherjee (Bikram Pramanik). Sengupta was portrayed as a tough, stern and unyielding police officer; shown chasing criminals on a bike in muddy terrain. In the previous film, Abir Chatterjee played the role of the police officer, who was replaced by Sengupta for the role. Mukherjee appeared in a small time frame portraying a sharp and authoritative Pramanik, who openly challenged and taunted the officer through his mockery, body language and attitude. Koushani Mukherjee appeared in the teaser as Jhimli Pramanik, the pickpocket wife of Bikram Pramanik. Sohini Sarkar also made an appearance.The plot was described by The Telegraph as a continuation of Bohurupi, centered in a rural landscape and focusing on multiple robberies and search for gold, while keeping the tradition of the original film by including folk elements. It was set for release on October 15.

The released teaser gained 1 million views in one hour, setting new records in Tollywood. Mukherjee wrote on media: "We are grateful for the overwhelming response to the teaser! Crossing one million views is incredibly exciting, but the audiences are in for an adrenaline rush with the world we have created in Bohurupi: The Golden Daku. Jisshu and I share an antagonising rivalry as two men on opposite sides of the law. [...] Bringing these two characters together has been an absolutely electrifying experience. We believe that the audiences are going to have a great time watching this edge-of-the-seat thriller unfold on the big screen this Puja."

The lines from the beginning of the teaser "We have no place for criminals to stay in this jail. The Education Minister is in cell number one, the Irrigation Minister is in cell number two, the Ration Minister is in cell number three - can you tell me? I have robbed 27 banks. I have no respect?" pulled popularity from audience. Film director Kaushik Ganguly predicted a huge box office collection for it.

=== Credits ===
Makeup for the actors were considered essential in the previous film. In Bohurupi: The Golden Daku, the credits and makeup were given the same importance. Papiya Chanda was given the role of the makeup artist, who also did the makeup in the previous film. Cinematography was done by Animesh Ghorui and editing by Malay Laha. Art direction was by Mridul Baidya and Saswati Karmakar. The choreographer was Mangesh Khadar. The same crew was assigned to the sequel as that of the original, consisting of Nonichora Das Baul, Boni Chakraborty, Anupam Roy, Shilajit Majumdar and Arnab Dutta. Jinia Sen was the creative producer, with Sanjay Agarwal serving as the co-producer. The film with more than 2,500 artists was aimed to finish the shooting and release by Puja.

== Music ==
Track listing
No.	Title	Lyrics	Music	Singer(s)	Length
1.	"Phool Phutechhe"	Nonichora Das Baul	Nonichora Das Baul, Bonnie Chakraborty	Arpita Chakraborty, Nonichora Das Baul, Bonnie Chakraborty	3:45
2.	"Bhulte Parbe Na"	Anupam Roy	Anupam Roy	Armaan Rashid Khan	5:35
3.	"Moydamukho Hit"	Ritam Sen, Nonichora Das Baul (folk verses)	Bonnie Chakraborty	Shrestha Das, Nonichora Das Baul, Bonnie Chakraborty	3:34
4.	"Bilai Meo Meo"	Mohammad Anhar Miah		Bonnie Chakraborty,Mohammad Anhar Miah	1:54
5.	"Bohurupi The Golden Daku Theme One"		Bonnie Chakraborty	Bonnie Chakraborty	1:08
6.	"Theme 2 (Dine Dupure)"		Bonnie Chakraborty	Bonnie Chakraborty, Nonichora Das Baul	1:27
7.	"Teen Shotti"	Arnab Dutta	Arnab Dutta	Arnab Dutta	3:54
8.	"Bom Shankar"	Silajit Majumdar	Silajit Majumdar	Silajit Majumdar, Sukanya Chatterjee	4:46
Total length:					26:03

The record label Times Music Bangla through Junglee Music bought the rights to the film's soundtrack five months before the official release was fixed, in June 2026. The buying of music rights five months before release was a big achievement for Bohurupi: The Golden Daku. The previous film's songs gained huge fame among the audience, winning multiple awards. According to Times Music Bangla, they had strong confidence in the music of Windows Production and bought the songs' rights before they were officially released. Though no full list of artists had been given by the filmmakers, Nonichora Das Baul, Anupam Roy, Shilajit and Arnab Dutta were said to be possibly playing the credits of singing. The music director was Bonnie Chakraborty. Some glimpses regarding the film's shooting were posted on social media, prompting audience feedback about the soundtrack to play a big function for it and the film itself.

== Marketing ==
=== Related events ===
Koushani Mukherjee, an actor of the film and Tollywood, celebrated her birthday on May 17, 2026. At this time the filming of Bohurupi: The Golden Daku was underway. She celebrated outdoors with all the crew and actors of the film sets. She posted pictures of the event on May 19 (Tuesday), wearing a self-made kurti. Among the crew, Mukherjee took pictures with the directors Shiboprosad Mukherjee, Nandita Roy and actor Jisshu Sengupta. Bengali cuisine was served in the event as food. Mukherjee captioned it as: "This year's birthday was busy! I celebrate my birthday in a special way every year, but this year was a little different. From shooting for the most special film of my career, to meeting family and friends during the long outdoor schedule, and the entire crew making me feel at home even outside of my home - everything was a different experience."

== Release ==
=== Theatrical ===
The film was released in India on 15 October 2026, coinciding with the Durga Puja festive period, followed by its release in the rest of India, outside West Bengal, and is set for a global release on 23 October 2026.

In the United States, advance booking for the film commenced two months prior to its worldwide release, a first in Shiboprosad Mukherjee's career. Under the initiative of the International Film Association of Connecticut, the film was scheduled for screenings in Boston on November 15 and in Connecticut on November 22, 2026.

=== Distribution ===
In a landmark development for Tollywood, Hombale Films acquired the global distribution rights for Bohurupi: The Golden Daku. Following Hombale's acquisition of global distribution rights for Oscar nominee film Gondhal, Nandita Roy called the collaboration a proud moment, saying they want Bengali films to reach audiences beyond West Bengal and be available in theaters abroad. She said Hombale Films approached them first with a global distribution offer, which was a pleasant surprise. Shiboprosad Mukherjee added that it was a proud moment when Hombale expressed interest in taking their film to international markets.

=== Digital distribution ===
Prior to its theatrical release, the digital streaming rights for Bohurupi: The Golden Daku were acquired by Sony Aath and SonyLIV, alongside the Dev-starrer DeSu7. This pre-release sale of digital rights marked a notable shift in the business model for major Bengali films releasing during the Durga Puja season, where traditionally the theatrical performance would inform the value of digital rights. The deal for Bohurupi: The Golden Daku was structured differently from that of DeSu7, reflecting the distinct commercial strategies for the two films.

== Reception ==
=== Critical reception ===
Eshna Bhattacharaya of The Times of India rated the film 3.5/5 stars and wrote "Bohurupi: The Golden Daku combines a lively chase, good humour, strong music and a conscience, anchored by a commanding lead performance. Be prepared for a few drawn-out stretches, but the climax rewards that patience." She praised the well written plot, unpredictable storyline, the screen presence of Shiboprosad, the performance of the lead cast, the comic sequences, the music, the background score, the cinematography, the costumes, the dialogues and the production designs but bemoaned the weakly written character for Sohini, the excessive length of the film, few unnecessarily stretched scenes, loose editing and few loopholes in the storyline.

Agnivo Niyogi of The Telegraph reviewed the film and opined "Somewhere between the clever plotting and the confrontations, the film loses sight of what made its predecessor so effective: the emotional connection between its characters and the audience. It ends up as an engaging crime thriller that often entertains but rarely moves the audience." She appreciated the themes of deception and disguise, unexpected twists, the engaging screenplay, the performance of the actors, the chemistry between Jisshu and Shiboprosad's characters, but criticized the lack of sufficient emotional backdrop and unexplored political subplots. Rahul Majumdar of Aajkal reviewed the film and worded it as a "successful sequel that blurs the line between right and wrong."

Atreyee Poddar of Indulge Express rated the film 4.5/5 stars and noted "Bohurupi – The Golden Daku is a sequel that justifies its existence. It has a tight screenplay, a lead performance that carries the film, and an emotional core that makes it more than a crime drama." She praised Siboprosad's acting, the tight screenplay, the performance of all the other actors, the chemistry between Shiboprosad and Koushani's characters and the short cameo at the end. Dulal Dey of Sangbad Pratidin reviewed the film and applauded the screenplay, Shiboprosad's performance, the touch of rural Bengal in Shiboprosad-Koushani's romantic scenes and the political undertones but criticized the weak cinematography and below par editing.
