= Ramdhanu =

2014 Indian Bengali film

- Theatrical release poster
- Directed by: Nandita Roy; Shiboprosad Mukherjee
- Written by: Suchitra Bhattacharya
- Produced by: Atanu Raychaudhuri; Windows Production; Jalan International Films
- Starring: Rachna Banerjee; Gargi Roychowdhury; Shiboprosad Mukherjee; Kharaj Mukherjee; Suzanne Bernert; Sasha Ghoshal; Akashneel Mitra
- Cinematography: Sirsha Ray
- Edited by: Moloy Laha
- Music by: Vinit Ranjan Moitra; Smriti Lala
- Release date: 6 June 2014
- Running time: 135 minutes
- Country: India
- Language: Bengali

Ramdhanu (transl. The Rainbow) is a 2014 Bengali family drama film directed by Nandita Roy and Shiboprosad Mukherjee. It was adapted from Suchitra Bhattacharya's short story, Ramdhanu Rawng. The film was produced by Windows and Jalan International Films and was presented by Atanu Raychaudhuri, Anirban Mitra. It released on 6 June 2014 and had performed well at the box office. The film has been cinematographed by Sirsha Ray and edited by Moloy Laha. The film was remade in Malayalam as Salt Mango Tree.

== Background ==
The Indian Parliament passed ‘The Right to Education Act’ or RTE Act - on 4 August 2009. One of the issues addressed in that was the school interviews. An order was passed that for admission, there should be no interviews of parents or children to ensure smooth enrollment for all. But was this ruling applicable to private schools? As the act took effect, private schools protested, claiming it violated their right to operate independently without government interference. The act was revised and made non-applicable to unaided, private, and boarding schools. And so the interview process continued in private schools, this time disguised as ‘interaction sessions’.

== Plot ==
Mitali is a worried mother. Her 5-year-old son, Gogol, has once again failed to pass the admission test in a reputed school, and the application has been rejected. This is the fourth time, and Mitali gets desperate. She is determined to get her only son admitted into a reputed school. Laltu Dutta, her husband, owns a chemist's shop, and all his efforts centre around running his business successfully. He is completely attached to his family and tries to do his best to fulfil his wife's aspirations.

When one school after school starts rejecting Gogol, a despondent Mitali takes the advice of her friend and hires a teacher for Gogol's tuition. Soon, Mitali gets disappointed by the young teacher's casual attitude and decides to teach Gogol herself. Mitali's desperation worries Laltu, and he decides to go the extra mile to make his wife happy. He even approaches a tout and is willing to pay him a handsome amount if he can procure admission for his son. The tout claims that he can get his son admitted to any school for Rs 10 lakh. The sum is exorbitant. He does not know how to procure that amount. Should he terminate his fixed deposits? But that is his only savings! On the other hand, he cannot bear to see the disappointment on his wife's face each time their son gets rejected.

The family decides to go to Bolpur, in the district of Birbhum, West Bengal, where Mitali's parents reside. It is a special occasion as her brother is returning home from abroad after a long time, along with his foreign wife. The holiday turns out to be interesting as Jennifer, the brother's wife, shows her keenness to adapt traditional Bengali customs, learn the language, and insist on speaking Bengali. She terms Mitali's insistence on getting her son admitted to an English-medium school and learning the English language as ‘linguistic imperialism'.

While Gogol spends a wonderful holiday with his grandparents and his new aunt, Mitali is anxiously waiting for the interview call for her son. When it finally arrives, they rush back home. The three of them attend the interview, but this time, Mitali feels it was Laltu who had ruined her son's chances by giving ludicrous answers to the questions put by the school's interview board. Mitali is furious. But she is not the one to give up hope so easily. She readies herself for the final bid. On the advice of another parent, Mitali decides to enroll herself, along with her husband, in a school that coaches parents to conduct themselves at interviews. Laltu is very reluctant at first but finally gives in to his wife's persuasions.

What follows is a poignant but hilarious journey as Laltu tries to learn the language, etiquette, and build his confidence to face the toughest of situations. The teacher of the coaching school is a wonderful lady who helps them conduct themselves well at interviews and readies them to face difficulties and recognize the worth of life itself! Does Gogol finally get through to the interview? Will Mitali be able to fulfil her dreams, or does she learn a greater lesson from all this and the importance of her child's well-being? Does Gogol's love for the song of birds, the flight of kites, the rustling of the leaves, the wide expanse of the blue sky, get crushed by the ambitions of his parents? Does Mitali finally look deep into her son's eyes and realise what makes him truly happy? Does she finally follow her heart? Many such moments are captured in the story as it hurtles towards a dramatic climax.

== Cast ==
- Gargi Roychowdhury as Mitali Dutta
- Shiboprosad Mukherjee as Laltu Dutta
- Rachana Banerjee as Madam
- Kharaj Mukherjee as Akash Singhania
- Akashneel Mitra as Gogol
- Rajat Ganguly as Sanju's father
- Rumki Chatterjee as Sanju's mother
- Chitra Sen as Mitali's mother in Bolpur
- Arijit Guha as Mitali's father in Bolpur
- Sasha Ghoshal Mitali's brother in Bolpur
- Suzanne Bernert as Mitali's sister-in-law in Bolpur.

== Box office ==
After a decent 70% opening on 6 June, 'Ramdhanu' steadily attracted an audience, eventually settling for a 100% occupancy across theatres. While weekday collections rarely dropped below 70%, the weekends roared back to a near 100% occupancy. At Priya in south Kolkata, which had a single show, the collections crossed Rs 4.6 lakh in the very first week. Made on a budget of Rs 75 lakh, the film opened to a bumper response in the city, notching up more than Rs 70 lakh by the 3rd weekend and in turn, emerged as the most profitable film of the year so far. It eventually ran for 7 weeks in the direct centers of the city after which it continued for 2 more weeks in the shifted centers.

== Response ==
The film received a good response from the audience. The actors' performances were credited highly. The film also did well in the box-office, especially when it was released with another star studded Bengali film, Game. Quoting the Times of India review, "Ramdhanu is a family drama with a touch of innocence and simplicity that will make you want to watch it again."

== Remake ==
Rajesh Nair has remade this film in Malayalam, by the name of Salt Mango Tree. It released on 6 November 2015. Shiboprosad also quipped that they are also planning to remake the film in Hindi.

== See also ==
- Muktodhara
- Accident
- Icche
- Alik Sukh
- Hindi Medium
