= Icche =

2011 Indian Bengali film

- Film poster
- Directed by: Shiboprosad Mukherjee and Nandita Roy
- Based on: Based on the novel Iccher Gach by Suchitra Bhattacharya
- Produced by: Vignesh Films
- Starring: Sohini Sengupta; Bratya Basu; Samadarshi Dutta; Bidita Bag; Ruplekha Mitra
- Cinematography: Soumik Haldar
- Music by: Surojit Chatterjee
- Release date: 15 July 2011 (Kolkata)
- Running time: 132 minutes
- Country: India
- Language: Bengali

Icche (transl. Wish) is a 2011 Bengali language Indian drama film directed by Shiboprosad Mukherjee and Nandita Roy. This is the debut film of the director duo. The film is based on Suchitra Bhattacharya's novel and revolves around the relationship between an obsessive mother and her son. The film was presented by Rituparna Sengupta and emerged as a box office success.

== Plot ==
Manas is an insurance agent, who lives with his wife, Mamata, and son Shamik. Mamata is dissatisfied with her husband's way of raising their son differently and takes charge of his upbringing. When Shamik grows up, he starts rebelling against his mother's decisions and dominance. At the age of 16, Shamik falls in love with his first crush, Debjani. When hawk-eyed Mamata learns about this relationship, she gets worried as she is sceptical about Debjani's nature and doesn't think she is a good choice. Mamata gears up to break her son's relationship with Debjani. She also tries to win over her son's attention and affection. Although she is successful in breaking up their relationship, all this effort pushes her away from her son even more.

Cut to the present day, Shamik is now a college student. He is in his second year and is in a relationship with Jayanti, a girl from the first year. Mamata discovers this relationship and tries to sabotage it in every way possible. She even goes to the extent of bringing back Debjani, Shamik's first girlfriend, by meeting her parents and offering her son to them as their son-in-law. Manas tries to tell his wife about the ill effects of her behaviour, but she pays no attention.

The talks of marriage are finalised without Mamata's knowledge. But Shamik has other plans --- he has already married Jayanti and is leaving for Mumbai. He declares this to a shocked Mamata and leaves the house. The touching climax of the film shows Mamata clutching the old toys and medals of Shamik and remembering his childhood, revealing that she never could quite accept that Shamik has grown up now and has a personal life. She still believes he is her little son, who is unaware of his well-being.

== Cast ==
- Sohini Sengupta as Mamata
- Bratya Basu as Manas
- Samadarshi Dutta as Shamik/Rana
- Bidita Bag as Jayanti
- Ruplekha Mitra as Debjani/Rinti
- Mithu Chakraborty as Debjani's mother
- Kunal Padhi as Debjani's father
- Biswajit Chakraborty as Jayanti's father
- Kamalika Banerjee as Shamik's Aunt
- Paroma Banerjee as Momota's sister

== Crew ==
- Director: Nandita Roy and Shiboprosad Mukherjee
- Story: Suchitra Bhattacharya
- Director of Photography: Soumik Halder
- Editor: Moloy Laha
- Sound: V.N Kishor, Biswajit Sengupta, Tito
- Costume: Ruma Sengupta
- Art Director: Tanmoy Chakroborty
- Producer: Vignesh Films
- Co-Producer: Encash Entertainment PVT. LTD.
- Presenter: Rakesh Singh, Sachet Saraf & Rituparna Sengupta
- Publicity Design: Saumik & Piyali

== Soundtrack ==
All music is composed by Surojit Chatterjee.

No.	Title	Singer(s)	Length
1.	"Halucination"	Rupam Islam
2.	"Boikunther Aasore Songi Ra Aase Bhir Kore"	Siddhartha
3.	"Ore Mon"	Surajit Chatterjee
4.	"Tor Najar Tor Kheyal"	Anindyo Chattopadhyay
5.	"Boikunther Aasore Songi Ra Aase Bhir Kore"	Anusheh Anadil

== Release ==
Shiboprosad had given up hope that his movie would ever see the light of day, which he felt was nothing short of a miracle. Individual rights related to various divisions of the film were sold to many companies. When the film was to get released, it was difficult to get someone to buy it because parts of it were already sold. “My cast, including Sohini, my composer, Surajit (of the then Bhoomi) tried to convince people to sell off their shares so that we could try to release the movie decently. Finally, our efforts got returns and it is releasing. This, incidentally, is the first movie of Bratya Basu that will be released after he became the higher education minister,” said Shiboprosad, before the film’s release. Producer Rakesh Singh added, “I had got confused with my product and had been misled by people about its viability. I got into an agreement with a person who misguided me. It took us three years to get out of the mess. I am happy that Tollywood will finally be able to watch this movie.” The director said he learnt a lot from this experience. “When a producer makes a content-oriented movie without stars, touts approach the producer to part with the video rights even before the film’s release. The usual logic offered is that it is more reasonable to earn money this way than wait for the film to become a box-office success. If a producer falls prey to this trap, he is finished. One thing I have learnt from this whole experience is that it is always important for a director to keep the copyright of his film with him. Otherwise, he will never have any say in the film’s release,” reasoned Shiboprosad. Rituparna, on her part, added, “I am very attached to the subject. I wanted to help Shibu. He has done various television productions for us. I had liked the script and though I was not acting in the film, I wanted it to be made. Thus, I came on board as a presenter. I think some very unfortunate things happened and that is why the movie was stuck in the cans. It is all a matter of time. Today is the right time for the movie to release and I am happy to be a presenter of the film.”

== Achievements ==
Icche ran in theatres for 125 days. The National Film Archive of India accepted it as part of their collection for cultural and educational purposes. Icche has been included in the Study of Women's Stress and Distress Management by Calcutta University. PVR Cinemas selected Icche to be screened in Kolkata, Delhi & Mumbai as part of the films of the Indian Panorama Film Festival. Sohini Sengupta won the "Anandalok Award for Best Actress" for her performance in Icche.

== See also ==
- Accident
- Alik Sukh
- Gotro
- Bela Seshe
- Konttho
- Haami
- Muktodhara
