= Bohurupi =

2024 Indian Bengali-language film

- Theatrical release poster
- Directed by: Nandita Roy; Shiboprosad Mukherjee
- Screenplay by: Nandita Roy
- Dialogues by: Shiboprosad Mukherjee
- Story by: Nandita Roy
- Produced by: Nandita Roy; Shiboprosad Mukherjee
- Starring: Shiboprosad Mukherjee; Abir Chatterjee; Ritabhari Chakraborty; Koushani Mukherjee
- Cinematography: Indranath Marick
- Edited by: Malay Laha
- Music by: Songs: Anupam Roy; Bonnie Chakraborty; Arnab Dutta; Nani Chora Das Baul; Silajit Majumdar; Background Score: Bonnie Chakraborty
- Production company: Windows Production
- Distributed by: Windows Production
- Release date: 8 October 2024
- Running time: 155 minutes
- Country: India
- Language: Bengali
- Budget: ₹4−5 crore (Note: Bohurupi's reported budgets vary between ₹4 crore (The Statesman) – ₹5 crore (The Hollywood Reporter India))
- Box office: ₹21.24 crore (Note: In India, including West Bengal, the net income is calculated by subtracting GST from the gross income of the film. The net income of the film is 18 crores, resulting in a gross income of almost 16.55 crores, including 18% GST.)

Bohurupi is a 2024 Indian Bengali-language caper action-thriller film written, directed and produced by Nandita Roy and Shiboprosad Mukherjee under the banner of Windows Production. Based upon a chain of real life events in the timeline between 1998 and 2005, the film stars Mukherjee himself in the titular role, alongside Abir Chatterjee, Ritabhari Chakraborty and Koushani Mukherjee in the lead roles. It follows a cat and mouse chase between a police officer, Sumanta Ghoshal (Chatterjee), and Bikram Pramanik (Shiboprasad), an ex-accountant-turned-bank dacoit.

The film was announced in February 2024, marking the second collaboration between the directorial duo and Chatterjee. Principal photography commenced in March 2024, while filming took places in Kolkata, Bolpur, Taki, Baranagar, Bantala, Barrackpore, Beldanga and Bethuadahari. The music of the film is composed by Anupam Roy, Bonnie Chakraborty, Arnab Dutta, Noni Chora Das Baul and Silajit Majumdar, while Bonnie Chakraborty himself provided its score. Malay Laha handled the editing while Indranath Marick did the cinematography. A sequel titled Bohurupi: The Golden Daku was released in Durga Puja.

Bohurupi was released in the theatres on 8 October 2024 on the occasion of Durga Puja. The film opened to positive reviews from the audience as well as the critics alike. Grossing over ₹21.24 crore, it became a blockbuster at the box office and emerged as the second highest grossing Indian Bengali film of 2024, the fifth highest grossing Indian Bengali film of all time as well as the eleventh highest grossing Bengali film overall. At the 8th Filmfare Awards Bangla, Bohurupi won seven awards out of sixteen nominations, including Best Film, Best Director, Best Actor (Shiboprosad). This film was partially remade in Tamil as Kara.

== Plot ==
The film draws inspiration from a series of real-life bank heists that transpired in the village of Raipur, South 24 Parganas, West Bengal, between 1998 and 2005. Set in the notorious rural village of Chhyanchrapur, Bikram plays the titular role of a "bohurupi"-cum-bank dacoit. He is a commerce graduate who works in the local jute mill. But things take a turn for him when he is arrested wrongly due to false accusations of murdering a communist union leader and stealing some jewels.

Although he pleaded for his innocence, SI Sumanta Ghosal didn't pay any heed to his pleas and beat him mercilessly inside the jail. This incident changed his entire ideology, his life and perception about honesty and the society. Hurt, for being arrested and beaten despite not being guilty, situations forced him to decide that he will commit real crimes. Inside the jail he met Selim, a seasoned bank robber and got trained in the tricks and trades of robbery from him.

Sumanta's wife Pori is mentally unstable and suffers from a rare bipolar disorder. He sent her to a mental home for treatment as it was becoming difficult for him to balance work and personal life. On the other hand, Jhimli is the village's best pickpocket, with whom Bikram falls in love and married her. The story further depicts how he landed up in a cat and mouse chase with Sumanta after doing a giant bank robbery at Ajaygunj Co-operative Bank, in just 4 minutes.

He did a total of 22 robberies in 3 years, but escaped every time for his ability to hide in different disguises. Towards the end, Sumanta finds out many of his subordinate officers shafted off major part of Bikram's loot after a robbery, when they caught him disguised as a woman outside a temple. Their final faceoff unfolded with a thrilling thief and police chase in which Sumanta's sole motive was to catch and provide jail sentence to Bikram and his gang. At the final scene, sitting beside Pori, Sumanta autographed his own written book "Bohurupi" and handed it over to Bikram who came in Kolkata Book fair along with his wife Jhimli and his son.

== Cast ==
- Abir Chatterjee as SI (later OC) Sumanta "Babi" Ghosal, an honest police officer hell bent on catching Bikram
- Shiboprosad Mukherjee as Bikram Pramanik alias Chuni Kumar / Bablu Sarkar / Eklas Chowdhury, a serial bank dacoit and con artist
- Ritabhari Chakraborty as Pori Ghoshal, Sumanta's mentally unstable wife
- Koushani Mukherjee as Jhimli Pramanik, a pickpocket and Bikram's partner-in-crime, later on his wife
- Prodeep Bhattacharya as Khuro, Bikram's partner-in-crime
- Reshmi Sen as Pori's Mother
- Sujan Neel Mukherjee as SP Rajat Dhar, Sumanta's boss

=== Cameo appearances ===
- Rajat Ganguly as Salim Khan, Bikram's mentor and cellmate in jail
- Kanchana Moitra as Bikram's sister-in-law
- Rohit Mukherjee as Bank Manager
- Kamal Chatterjee as Chhoku Da
- Manasi Sinha as Bank Manager
- Subhrajit Dutta as Bank Manager
- Bhaskar Banerjee as Bank Manager
- Silajit Majumdar as a Baul singer
- Suparna Das as a Baul singer (in the voice of Sukanya Chattopadhyay)
- Nani Chora Das Baul as a Bohurupi

== Production ==
=== Announcement and development ===
On 27 February 2024, the makers announced the film with a concept poster on their social media handles. The poster also included the date of release and the names of the lead cast. The character of Abir as Sumanta Ghoshal was based on the cop Srimanta Bandyopadhyay who caught the bank dacoit in real life.

In an interview, Shiboprosad revealed that they had been planning this film since 2012, after Muktodhara. They came up with the idea of this film when Sheikh Eklas, the real person who had committed the robberies had contacted them through a reference. He wanted them to make a film about his thefts, to glorify his deed. They couldn't make the film at that time due to budget issues but decided to make it in 2024, after the commercial success of their previous ventures. In an interview, Nandita Roy revealed that the person told them that he had robbed 27 banks in 5 years and he wanted to tell his story to all the people. To make the film more authentic and intricately detailed, the director duo conducted personal interviews with both the real-life dacoit and the Sub-Inspector who lead the team tasked with apprehending him.

=== Casting ===
This film marked the first time collaboration of Kousani with the director duo. Mukherjee cast Koushani for the role of Jhimli, watching her style of speaking and a big smile, which supported the traits of that character. It also marked the second time on screen pairing up between Abir and Ritabhari after the success of Fatafati in 2023. Roy revealed they paired Abir and Ritabhari opposite each other once again as their chemistry was loved and appreciated by the audience in Fatafati. After a brief period of separation, it also marked the re-collab between WINDOWS and Junglee Music for the music rights.

=== Filming ===
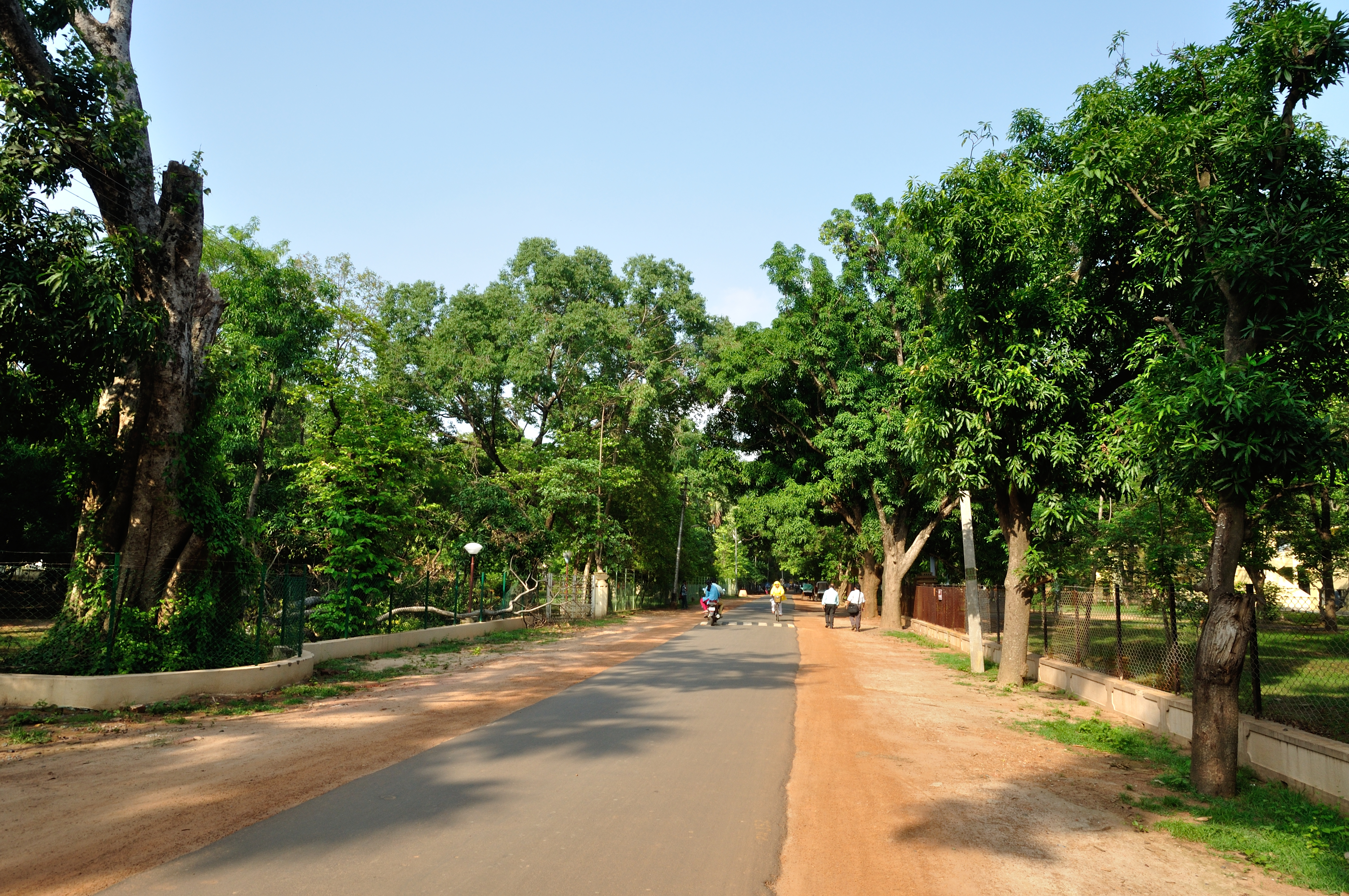
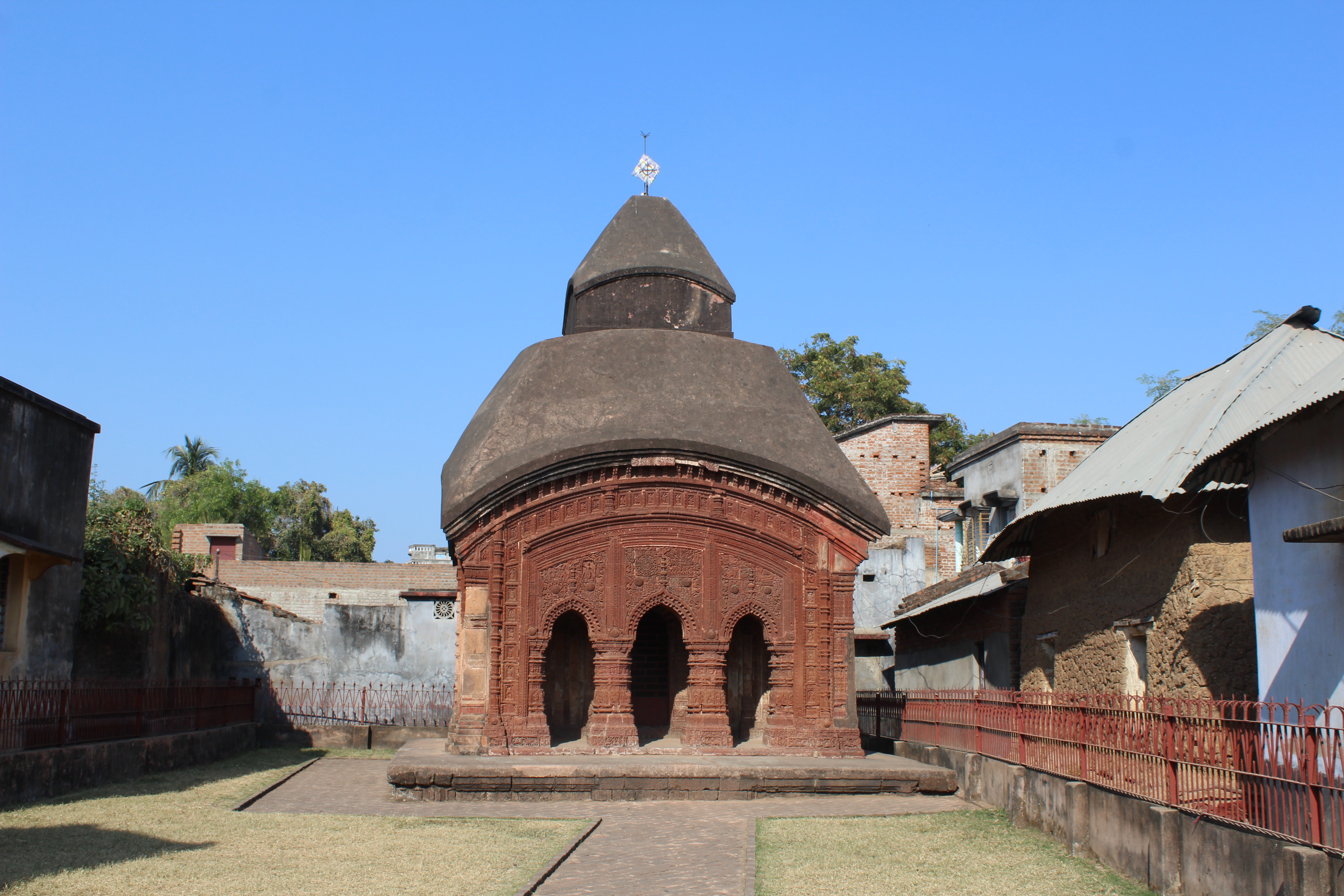
Bolpur (left) and Birbhum (right): Major parts of the film were filmed in these two locations.

The film was primarily shot in Bolpur, in the backdrop of rural Bengal. The filming started on 12 March 2024 with a Pooja ceremony at the shooting location. The film was shot across 84 locations including Kolkata, Taki, Baranagar, Bantala, Barrackpore, Bolpur, Murshidabad, Beldanga and Bethuadahari over 34 days. Parts of the film was shot at Kalikapur Rajabri, Aushgram in Bardhaman. The marriage scene of Shiboprosad and Koushani was shot at an ancient teracotta temple in front of the Rajbari. The filming featured over 100 original bohurupi artists from across Bengal, to maintain an authentic portrayal of their craft.

The song "Shimul Palash" included a dance sequence which was challenging for him as he performed it just after recovering from his lumbar injury. Koushani mentioned in an interview that she joined pottery sessions by some potters to learn to prepare mud utensils. She also spoke about the difficulties of shooting a dance sequence in soft mud as it was challenging to maintain balance on it. The song "Dakatiya Banshi" took 8 hours to shoot. Koushani informed in an interview that she rehearsed the song in a few weeks, in the gaps between the shooting schedule.

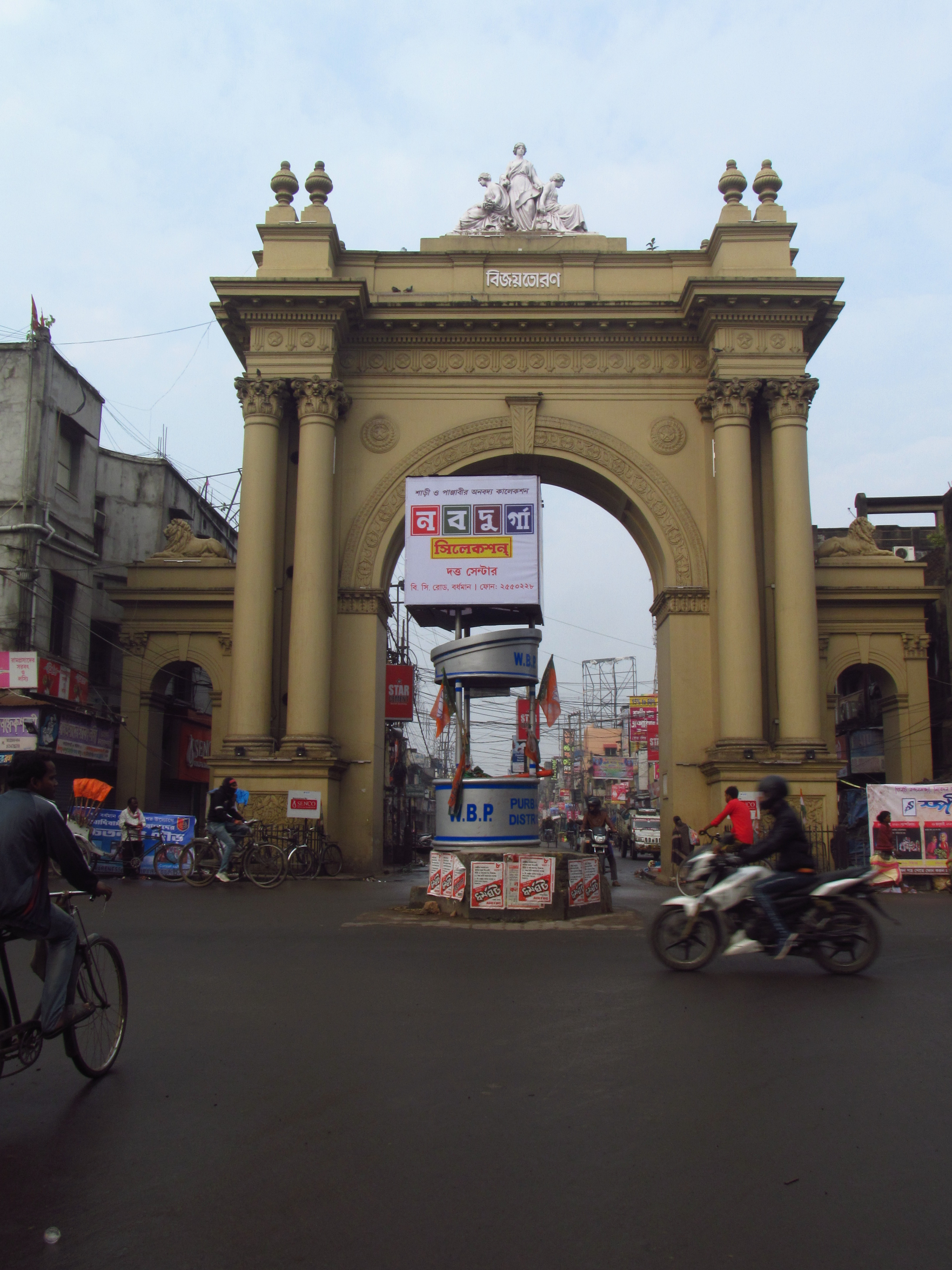
Bardhaman: Parts of the movie was shot here

In an interview, Nandita Roy of the director duo spoke about the challenges of shooting in Bolpur, in the scorching summer heat, unforeseen torrential rain and sudden chill winds. An action scene with 400 schoolchildren accompanied by their guardians, which was planned to be shot on the 9th day, was delayed due to the downpours. The shooting was completed and wrapped on 15 May 2024. At the music launch event of "Aj Shara Bela", Ritabhari said that her bathing scene was shot in the dalan of an old house.

Shiboprosad Mukherjee went under a heavy transformation in his physique through a strict diet and exercise to suit the needs of his character in the film. To keep authenticity to the character, he avoided prosthetics and relied on his normal physical features. His diet included boiled lentils, dry fruits, tea, oats and boiled vegetables. There was no carbs or oily food. Following this routine, he reduced his weight from 78 kg to 65 kg for the film.

In Bolpur, Abir shot a number of bike stunts in the forest on slippery and skiddy roads by himself without using any body double, despite being dangerous for him. In an interview with ThePrint, Mukherjee spoke about how they spent many days in the bohurupi village in Bisoypur, Birbhum to learn their unique dialect. While shooting an action scene, he succumbed to an injury in his lumbar bone. Medical reports stated that it was a mild fracture but he needed bedrest. After a brief pause, the shooting was started again from 27 April 2024 at Kolkata. After a speedy recovery, he returned to the sets and completed his part towards the end of the shooting schedule.

== Soundtrack ==
Bohurupi

Soundtrack album by Anupam Roy, Bonnie Chakraborty, Arnab Dutta, Nani Chora Das Baul and Silajit Majumdar
- Released: 2024
- Genre: Film soundtrack
- Length: 28:20
- Language: Bengali
- Labels: WINDOWS, Times Music Bangla
External audio
- Audio Jukebox on YouTube

The music of the film has been done by Anupam Roy, Bonnie Chakraborty, Arnab Dutta, Nani Chora Das Baul and Silajit Majumdar while Bonnie Chakraborty did the background score.

The first song "Shimul Palash", with influences from "folk" and "baul" music was released on 13 September 2024. It was critically acclaimed by eminent musicians like A. R. Rahman.

The second single "Aj Shara Bela" was released on 20 September 2024. The third single "Dakatiya Banshi" was released on 25 September 2024. The fourth single "Tui Amar Hoye Ja" was released on 5 October 2024.

The fifth song, which was featured in the climax, "Tui Kyane Eli Sarobore", was released on 23 October 2024. It contained extracts from the Manasamangal Kāvya, the oldest of the Bengali Mangal-Kāvyas, chronicling the establishment of the snake-goddess Devi Manasa's worship in Bengal.

Track listing
No.	Title	Lyrics	Music	Singer(s)	Length
1.	"Shimul Palash"	Nanichora Das Baul	Nanichora Das Baul, Bonnie Chakraborty	Shrestha Das, Nanichora Das Baul, Bonnie Chakraborty	5:38
2.	"Aj Shara Bela"	Anupam Roy	Anupam Roy	Shreya Ghoshal	5:16
3.	"Dakatiya Banshi"	Anindya Bose, Nanichora Das Baul	Bonnie Chakraborty	Shrestha Das, Nanichora Das Baul, Bonnie Chakraborty	3:56
4.	"Tui Amar Hoye Ja"	Arnab Dutta	Arnab Dutta	Arnab Dutta, Shreshtha Das	5:16
5.	"Bohurupi Theme 1"		Bonnie Chakraborty	Tamal Kanti Halder	2:08
6.	"Bohurupi Theme 2"		Bonnie Chakraborty	Sudipto Paul	0:57
7.	"Tui Kyane Eli Sarobore"	Silajit Majumdar and Extracts from Manasamangal Kāvya	Silajit Majumdar	Silajit Majumdar, Sukanya Chattopadhyay	5:09
Total length:					28:20

== Marketing ==
The first look motion posters of the lead actors revealing their character's name in the film were released in July 2024. The first motion poster launch event was held on 7 August 2024 at "Soul — The Sky Lounge" in Kolkata in presence of the cast of the film.

The announcement teaser was postponed as a sign of protest against the recent RG Kar rape and murder incident. Initially planned to release on 14 August 2024, the announcement teaser was released via a digital launch on 28 August 2024. The teaser was released on 6 September 2024 on WINDOWS YouTube channel. It was critically acclaimed and went on trending to the top spot on various social media platforms including YouTube and X (Twitter). The trailer was released on 1 October 2024.

Shiboprosad and Nanichora Das Baul visited Jeet, Raj Chakraborty, Subhashree Ganguly, Srabanti Chatterjee and Aniruddha Roy Chowdhury's houses, dressed as bohurupis, as a unique way of promoting the film. The music album of the film was launched on 6 October 2024. The event was marked by live performances of the songs in the movie by their respective artists including Shreshtha Das, Arnab Dutta, Anupam Roy and Nanichora Das Baul. The fifth song of the album "Tui Kyane Eli" by Silajit was also performed at the event, before it was released on the streaming platforms.

A promotional-cum-success video titled Bohurupi Medley, which featured scenes from the movie accompanied by a juxtaposition of the songs and background score, was released on 1 November 2024 on the occasion Kali Puja. On 30 October 2024, as a part of the post release promotions, Shiboprosad accompanied with Prosenjit Chatterjee went to watch the film. Later, Chatterjee praised the film on his social media handles. It was also praised by other Tollywood personalities like Koel Mallick, Ranjit Mallick and Kaushik Ganguly, who praised the film for the displaying the rooted Bengali culture and conveying strong political messages intertwined with the elements of a commercial family entertainer.

== Release ==
=== Pre-release business ===
The music rights of the film have been acquired by Junglee Music for ₹50 lakhs. This was the first time in the Bengali film industry, that the music rights of a film has been sold for such a high amount.

=== Theatrical ===
The film was released in the theatres on 8 October 2024, on the occasion of Durga Puja, on 321 shows.

=== Home media ===
The post-theatrical OTT rights were bought by ZEE5, and the film was released digitally on 9 May 2025, coinciding with the theatrical release of Windows' next film, Aamar Boss.

== Reception ==
=== Box office ===
With 132 almost houseful and 6 houseful shows on Saptami and 120 almost houseful shows on Ashtami, the film has grossed over ₹2.1 crores in the first 3 days. It grossed ₹4.98 crore in the first week. After two weeks, its collections stood at ₹7.96 crore. At the end of the third week, the film had collected ₹11.04 crore. By the end of October, it earned ₹12.50 crore. Out of that, the film collected ₹4.27 crore from outside West Bengal. After one month of theatrical run, the film had earned over ₹14 crore. The film grossed over ₹15 crore after 40 days in the theatres, and became the third Bengali film ever to go past the ₹15 crore mark after Chander Pahar (2013) and Amazon Obhijaan (2017). It collected over ₹5.57 crore from the multiplexes, which is the highest ever multiplex collection for a Bengali film. After 75 days, the film grossed over ₹17.25 crore. At the end of its theatrical run, the film grossed over ₹21.24 crore against a production budget of ₹4−5 crore. It ran in the theatres for over 175 days and emerged as the second highest grossing Bengali film of 2024 and fourth highest grossing Bengali film ever.

=== Critical reception ===
Sudeep Ghosh Anandabazar Patrika rated the film 8.5 out of 10 stars and wrote "Bohurupi is an intense intellectual chase thriller between thief and police, which will keep the audience engaged till the very last moment. It speaks about the story of defeated people who deny to bow their head down." He mentioned that the story successfully interwinds the elements of emotion, family misunderstandings, love, adventure, courage and Bengali sentiments. He also praised the acting acumen of Shiboprosad, Abir, Ritabhari and Koushani. Priyak Mitra of Sangbad Pratidin reviewed the film and wrote "The film aptly presents the life and sufferings of the bohurupi community and how they are trapped in the viscious cycle of poverty and politics." He mentioned the similarities between the married life of the thief and police to be redundant to the plot but praised the acting, cinematography and music.

Prachet Gupta of Aajkal reviewed the film and termed it "an experience, where there are colours as well as the cleansing of colours." He wrote "Right and wrong, good and evil, black and white; everything gets mixed up. Thief and police; both are hero and again both are villain. It shows how there are colours in the life of bohurupis and how frequently those are washed down." Sayan Sarkar of the Indian Express rated the film 4.5 out of 5 stars and wrote "Bohurupi is one of the best thriller entertainers in the recent times." Besides specially applauding Shiboprosad and Koushani's chemistry, he also praised everyone's acting, the script, songs and dialogues. He also mentioned it to be one of the best unadulterated Bengali film in recent times which displays the Bengali culture.

Nibedita Bhattacharya of ABP Ananda rated the film 4 out of 5 stars and wrote "It will be difficult to assign someone as complete good or complete evil, whether it is the thief or the police. The film on one hand speaks about politics, poor people, the language of rebellion and how the poor are trapped in the cycle of politics." She praised the rooted Bengali culture shown in the film, the intense chase sequences, bohurupi's songs and the acting mettle of the lead pairs, specially Abir and Shiboprosad. Deboleena Ghosh of Ei Samay rated the film 4 out of 5 stars and wrote "Shiboprosad's acting is the heart of the film, which speaks out the heart of the commoners." She praised the direction, script, music and specially applauded the makers for the beautiful portrayal of rural Bengal.

Shoma A. Chatterji of the North East Film Journal reviewed the film and wrote "The film stands out for its ability to sustain the suspension factor till the very end without sacrificing the satire, entertainment factor and the story." She praised the film in all the major aspects including the direction, performances by the entire cast, unique shooting locations, production design, sound mixing, editing and the music accompanied by some of the rare traditional instruments. Shamayita Chakraborty of OTTplay rated the film 3.5 out of 5 stars and wrote "Bohurupi delivers what it promises. Unadulterated entertainment as a masala entertainer in a cat-and-mouse game, which is lavishly shot and added with Shiboprosad's skillful acting." She praised the well written script, comedy timings, chemistry between the two lead pairs, chase sequences, music and the background score but criticised the melodrama in the initial parts of the second half. She especially mentioned Shiboprosad and Abir to be the limelight of the film, but also praised the acting of Ritabhari and Koushani.
