= Sampurna Lahiri =

Bengali film and television actress (born 1986)

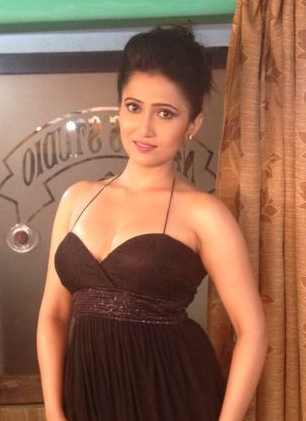
- Born: 21 February 1991 (age 35); Kolkata, West Bengal, India
- Occupation: Actress
- Years active: 2012- present

Sampurna Lahiri is a Bengali film and television actress. She made her big screen debut in the 2012 film Goray Gondogol. In the same year she acted in the films Accident and Paanch Adhyay.

== Filmography ==
Year	Film	Director	Notes
2012	Goray Gandogol	Aniket Chattopadhyay	
2012	Accident	Nandita Roy, Shiboprosad Mukherjee	
2012	Paanch Adhyay	Pratim D. Gupta	
2014	Take One	Mainak Bhowmik	Guest Appearance
2014	Byomkesh Phire Elo	Anjan Dutta	
2016	Janbaaz	Sumit Dutta	
2016	Jenana	Barshali Chatterjee	
2016	Sangabora	Bulan Bhattacharya	
2016	Parobash	Niladri Lahiri	
2016	Antarleen	Arindam Bhattacharya	
2017	Durga Sohay	Arindam Sil	
2017	Harpada Haribol	Subir Saha	
2017	Amar Sahor	Jenny and Dipayan	
2019	Shankar Mudi	Aniket Chattopadhyay	Guest Appearance
TBA	Kolkata 2012	Bappaditya Bandyopadhyay	
TBA	Pied Piper	Vivek Budhakoti	Hindi film
TBA	Tritio	Animesh Bose	

=== As Producer ===
- Mini (2022)

== Web series ==
Year	Name	Director	Platform	Note	Ref.
2018	Dark Web	Sayantan Ghosal	Hoichoi	Marked her web series debut	
2019	Bou Keno Psycho	Debaloy Bhattacharya	Hoichoi		

== Television ==
- Tare Ami Chokhe Dekhini (Star Jalsha)
- Bigg Boss Bangla"Contestant" (ETV Bangla)
- Byomkesh ( Chiriakhana) (Colors Bangla)
- Robi Thakurer Golpo ( Nauka Dubi) (Colors Bangla)
- Byomkesh (2014 TV series)
- Najor as Daayan/Maya (Star Jalsha)
- Bangla Medium as Sohana (Star Jalsha) (Later replaced by Misty Singh)
