= Koneenica Banerjee =

Indian actress

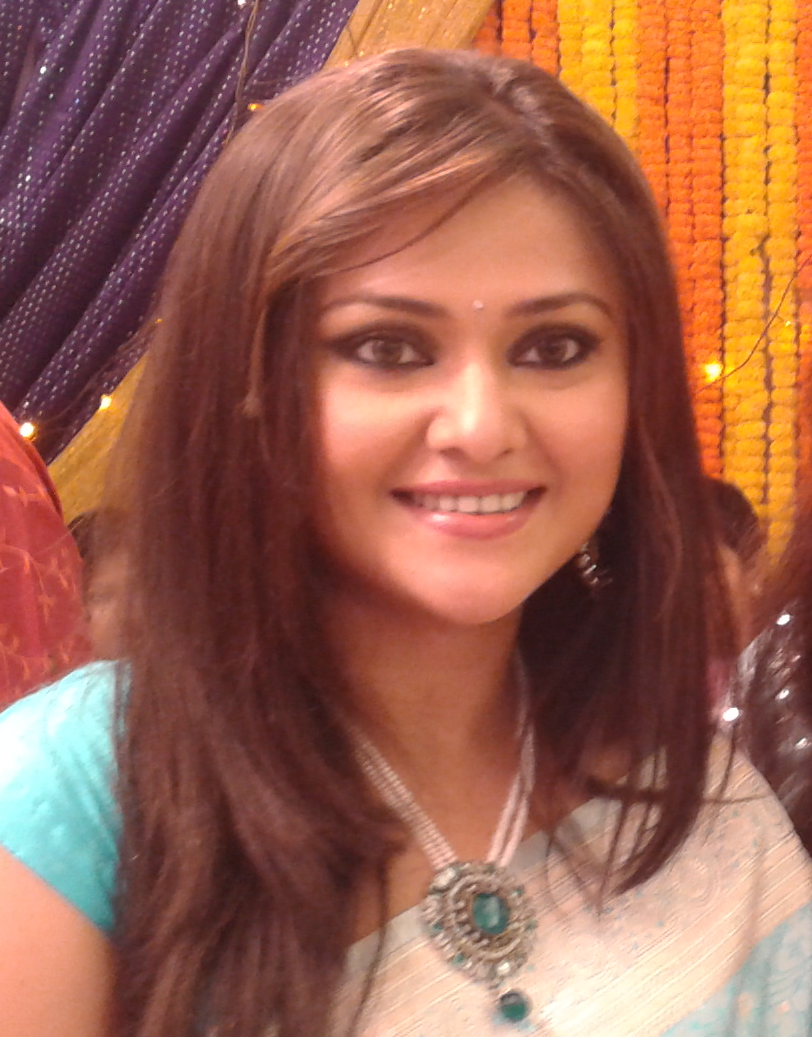
- Banerjee at an advertisement shoot
- Born: 21 May 1980 (age 46); Kolkata, India
- Education: University of Calcutta
- Occupation: Actress
- Years active: 2000–present
- Spouse: Surajit Hari (m. 2017)

Koneenica Banerjee (born 21 May 1980 in Kolkata) is an Indian actress associated with Tollywood, predominantly appears in Bengali films and serials.

== Filmography ==
Year	Movie	Director	Character
2003	Chor O Bhagoban	Biplab Chatterjee	
2004	Tin Ekke Tin	Maloy Bhattacharjee	
2004	Abar Ashibo Phire	Rabi Ojha	Gauri / Pritha
2005	Babu Masai	Akash	
2007	I Love You	Rabi Kinagi	
2008	Chalo Let's Go	Anjan Dutt	June
2011	Hello Memsaheb	Nandita Roy and Shiboprosad Mukherjee	Guest Appearance
2012	Goraay Gondogol	Aniket Chattopadhyay	
2012	Mahakash Kando	Nitish Roy	Baro Bou
2013	Mahapurush O Kapurush	Aniket Chattopadhyay	
2013	Ganesh Talkies	Anjan Dutt	
2013	Annyo Naa	Partha Sarathi Joarder	
2014	Chotushkone	Srijit Mukherji	Shree
2015	Ichchhemotir Gappo	Adinath Das	Sanji
2015	Mon Churi	Premasish Dey	Kolabati
2015	Kader Kuler Bou	Soubhik Kundu	Ruksar
2016	Shororipu	Ayan Chakraborty	Konee
2016	Chocolate	Sujan Mukhopadhyay	Sonjukta
2017	Billu Rakkhosh	Indrasis Acharya	Sohini
2017	Posto	Nandita Roy and Shiboprosad Mukherjee	Cameo appearance
2018	Hoichoi Unlimited	Aniket Chattopadhyay	
2018	Haami	Nandita Roy and Shiboprosad Mukherjee	Shyamoli Rakshit
2019	Mukherjee Dar Bou	Pritha Chakraborty	Aditi Mukherjee
2019	Konttho	Nandita Roy and Shiboprosad Mukherjee	Indrani
2021	Tonic	Avijit Sen	Jaladhar's Daughter-in-law
2022	Projapoti	Avijit Sen	Gour's Daughter
2023	Pradhan	Avijit Sen	Sikha
2026	Phool Pishi O Edward	Nandita Roy and Shiboprosad Mukherjee	Rajlakshmi

== Television films ==
- Aasma
- Neer Chhoto
- Notun Gaan
- Leela Chirantan
- Tomar Patho Cheye
- Maanbhanjan
- Kader Kuler Bou

== Television series ==
- MAHAPRABHU
- Ek Akasher Niche
- Swapnanil
- Kokhono Megh Kokhono Bristi
- Raat Bhor Brishti
- Ak Masher Gappo (Jhumur)
- Robi Thakurer Golpo in Colors Bangla
- Bigg Boss Bangla season 1(2013)
- Neel Simana
- Sarkar ki Duniya
- Andarmahal
- Aay Tobe Sohochori

== Awards ==
Year	Award	Category	Character	Film/TV show
2004	Anandalok Puroshkar	Best Actress (Critics)	Gauri/Pritha	Abar Ashibo Phire
2004	Kalakar Awards	Best Rising Star	Gauri/Pritha	Abar Ashibo Phire
2018	Zee Bangla Sonar Sansar Awards 2018	Favourite Daughter-in-Law	Poromeshwari	Andarmahal
2021	Istanbul Film Awards	Best Narrative Short Film	along with Sudipta Chakraborty	Porichoy
2022	Star Jalsha Parivar Awards 2022	Favourite Mother-in-Law	Sohochori	Aay Tobe Sohochori
2025	Zee Bangla Sonar Sansar Awards 2025	Favourite Member	Host	Rannaghor
2026	Zee Bangla Sonar Sansar Awards 2026	Favourite Member	Host	Rannaghor
