= Sohini Sengupta =

Indian actress

- Born: Kolkata, India
- Occupation: Actress
- Spouses: Goutam Halder (div. 2006); Saptarshi Maulik (m. 2013)
- Parents: Rudraprasad Sengupta (father); Swatilekha Sengupta (mother)

Sohini Sengupta is an Indian actress and theatre artist, who mostly works in the Bengali film and entertainment industry. She is a member of the Bengali theatre group Nandikar. Sengupta was awarded the Sangeet Natak Akademi's Ustad Bismillah Khan Yuva Puraskar in 2007 for her contributions to the theatre. For her debut performance in the Aparna Sen directorial Paromitar Ek Din (2000), she won the National Film Award for the Best Supporting Actress at the 47th National Film Awards.

== Personal life ==
Sengupta was born to parents Rudraprasad Sengupta and Swatilekha Sengupta in Kolkata. She was married to actor Goutam Halder till their divorce in 2006. In 2013 she married her co-actor Saptarshi Moulik at a private ceremony.

== Filmography ==
| Year | Film | Role | Director | Notes | Ref. |
|---|---|---|---|---|---|
| 2000 | Paromitar Ek Din | Sanjukta (Khuku) | Aparna Sen | Marked her feature film debut | |
| 2011 | Icche | Mamata | Shiboprosad Mukherjee and Nandita Roy | Protagonist | |
| 2013 | Alik Sukh | Kabita | Shiboprosad Mukherjee and Nandita Roy | | |
| 2015 | Belaseshe | A neighbour | Shiboprosad Mukherjee and Nandita Roy | Cameo appearance | |
| 2017 | Posto | Gauri Lahiri | Shiboprosad Mukherjee and Nandita Roy | | |
| 2020 | Sanjhbati | Rupkotha a.k.a. Muni | Leena Gangopadhyay and Saibal Banerjee | | |
| 2022 | Abhijaan | Poulami Chatterjee | Parambrata Chattopadhyay | Biographical film | |
| 2022 | Aay Khuku Aay | Putul Rani Bagchi | Sauvik Kundu | | |
| 2023 | Pradhan | Joba Mukherjee | Avijit Sen | | |
| 2024 | Babli | Babli's aunt | Raj Chakraborty | | |
| 2024 | Shontaan | Lata | Raj Chakraborty | | |
| 2025 | Aarii | Phoolu | Jiit Chakraborty | | |
| 2025 | Grihapravesh | Sreemati Roy | Indraadip Dasgupta | | |
| 2026 | Nari Choritro Bejay Jotil | Jhontu's mother | Sumeet–Saahil | | |
| 2026 | Phool Pishi O Edward | Phoolchapa Nandy, Phool Pishi | Shiboprosad Mukherjee and Nandita Roy | In the key role. | |

== Plays ==
- Gotraheen ^{[a]}
- Babli
- Chitrangada
- Bappaditya
- Sojon Badiyar Ghat
- Madhabi
- Kanyadan
- Dulia
- Amaar Priyo Rabindranath
- Anto Adi Anto
- Tomaar Naam
- Kanyadan
- Rani Kadambini
- Tomar Naam
- Ajnatobaas
- Naachni
- Bipannata
- Mrityunjoy
- Panchajanya

== Television ==
| Year | Soap opera | Role | Network | Notes | Ref. |
|---|---|---|---|---|---|
| 2019 | Thakumar Jhuli | Narrator (Thakuma) | Star Jalsha | First television appearance | |
| 2020 | Khorkuto | Meghomala "Putu" Mukerjee | Star Jalsha | First daily soap opera | |
| 2022 | Sona Roder Gaan | Chandana Mukherjee | Colors Bangla | | |
| 2022–2023 | Guddi | Mummum Chatterjee | Star Jalsha | | |
| 2023 | Badal Shesher Pakhi | Pranati Mukherjee | Sun Bangla | | |
| 2026–present | Kamala Nibas | Kamala Guha | Zee Bangla | First lead role in a daily soap opera | |

== Web series ==
| Year | Title | Director | Role | Platform | Notes | Ref. |
|---|---|---|---|---|---|---|
| 2023 | Abar Proloy | Raj Chakraborty | Constable Madhobi | ZEE5 | Marked her web series debut | |
| 2024 | Advocate Achinta Aich | Joydeep Mukherjee | Advocate Nandini Sinha | Hoichoi | Joined the series in its second season | |
| 2025 | Anusandhan | Aditi Roy | Journalist Mili Mitra | Hoichoi | | |

== Awards ==
| Year | Award | Category | Role | Film/Show | Notes | Result | Ref. |
|---|---|---|---|---|---|---|---|
| 1999 | National Film Awards | Best Supporting Actress | Sohini Haldar | Paromitar Ek Din | —N/a | Won | |
| 2007 | Sangeet Natak Akademi | Ustad Bismillah Khan Yuva Puraskar | —N/a | —N/a | For her contributions to the theatre | Won | |
| 2013 | ABP Ananda Sera Bangali | —N/a | —N/a | —N/a | For her contributions to the Bengali film industry | Won | |
| 2020 | The Telegraph She Awards | —N/a | —N/a | —N/a | For her contributions to the theatre | Won | |
| 2022 | Star Jalsha Parivaar Awards | Priyo Nonod | Putu Pishi | Khorkuto | —N/a | Won | |
| 2025 | Zee 24 Ghanta Binoder Sera 24 | Best Supporting Actor - Female | Sreemati | Grihapravesh | —N/a | Won | |

== Notes ==
^{a} This was the first play where Swatilekha and Sohini– mother and daughter worked together.
