= Debshankar Haldar =

Indian actor

- দেবশঙ্কর হালদার
- Born: 8 January 1965 (age 61); Kolkata, India
- Occupation: Bengali theatre actor

Debshankar Haldar (Note: Spelling according to Telegraph Calcutta.) (or Debshankar Halder (Note: Spelling according to Deccan Herald.) or Debsankar Halder (Note: This spelling has been used in Nandikar's website.)) is a Bengali theatre actor with a long career in Bengali theatre groups such as Nandikar, Rangapat, Natyaranga, Sudrak, Gandhar, Bratyajon, Sansriti and Blank Verse. He started with Nandikar. After that he started freelancing kolkata theatre. He is Known for his versatility, he played the role of Debabrata Biswas in ‘Bratyajon’'s production ‘Ruddha Sangeet’, Swami Vivekananda in Lokkrishti's Biley and the historical theatrical figure Sisir Kumar Bhaduri in Indraranga's Nisshanga Samrat. Debshankar has also worked in films.

== Early life ==
Debshankar Haldar was born in Kolkata. His father Abhay Haldar was an actor of Bengali Jatra and his brother Amiya Haldar is an actor in the Bengali theatre group Bohurupee. He graduated from the Scottish Church College at the University of Calcutta. He credits his father for his introduction to the theatre world. In 1986 Haldar joined a workshop organized by Nandikar with the intention of learning acting. The workshop was so engrossing that he decided not to look beyond theatre. Over the years he has been keenly involved with every aspect of theatre. One of the leading trainers of the group and closely associated with Nandikar's Children's Ensemble he has written and directed over 40 children's plays including the much acclaimed Bhalo Manush Noigo Mora. His first directorial venture outside Nandikar is Story Teller's 'Topi'.

In April 2010, Rangapat held a theatre festival to showcase the works of actor Debshankar Haldar. a feat which no other stage actor from Bengal has achieved, not even the greats like Sisir Kumar Bhaduri, Sombhu Mitra or Utpal Dutta.

== Career ==
=== Filmography ===
- Mahananda (2022)
- Cholo Potol Tuli (2020)
- Maya Mridanga (2016)
- Tadanto (2015–16) by Nitish Roy
- Arundhati (2014)
- Alik Sukh (2013)
- Rasta
- Bhalo Theko
- Mahulbanir Sereng
- Herbert
- Chha-e Chhuti
- Muktodhara
- Accident
- Na Hannyate
- Jangal Mahal Amader Katha (unreleased)
- Gangasagar (unreleased)
- Hathat Babur Kissa (unreleased)
- E Ki Labanye (unreleased)
- Kalkijug
- Kintu Golpo Noi
- Gahin Hriday
- Drishyantar

=== Television ===
- Happy Parent's Day
- Binni Dhaner Khoi
- Lokkhi Kakima Superstar (2022)
- Apni Ki Bolen (2022)
- Kamala Nibas (2026)

=== Audio Drama Albums ===
- Shesher Kabita
- Ami Vivekananda
- Nisshanga Samrat
- Shesh Ontora (Jackson Records 2013)
- Chorkata (Jackson Records 2013)

=== Plays ===
- Shesh Shakkhatkar (Nandikar)
- Gotroheen (Nandikar)
- Football(Nandikar)
- Ei Sahar, Ei Samay (Nandikar)
- Feriwalar Mrityu (Nandikar)
- Nagar Kirtan (Nandikar)
- Sojan Badier Ghat (Nandikar)
- Jaha Chai (Nandikar)
- Mephisto (Chetana)
- Winkle Twinkle (Sansriti)
- Iye(Sansriti)
- Virus M (Gonokrishti)
- Shajahan (Natyaranga)
- Agantuk (Natyaranga)
- Aurangzeb (Rangapat)
- Aguner Barnamala (Drishyapat)
- Furrut (Blank Verse)
- Missed Call (Naye Natua)
- Kachher Manush (Gandhar)
- Ruddhasangeet (Bratyajon)
- Madhabi (Nandikar)
- Shuonpoka (Nat-Ranga)
- 221 B Baker Street (Story teller)
- Gora (Abhash)
- Dahananto (Sudrak)
- Topi (Story Teller)
- Aamar Priyo Rabindranath (Nandikar)
- Anto Aadi Anto( Nandikar )
- Biley (Lokkrishti)
- Oedipus (Drishyapat)
- Jadidang (Nat-Ranga)
- Virus M (Ganakrishti)
- Rater Kutum (Nandikar)
- Nachni (Nandikar)
- Kallu Mama(Ushnik)
- Nishhanga Samrat (Paikpara Indraranga)
- Jharer Pakhi (Natyaranga)
- Romcom (Lokkrishti)
- Altaf Gomes (Sansriti)
- Dharmashok (Rangapat)
- Barnoporichoy (Dakshin Ruchirango)
- Duto Din (Pancham Vaidik)
- Boma (Bratyajan)
- Sher Afganer Tiner Talowar (Natyaranga)
- Phera (Shyambajar Mukhomukhi)
- Eepsa (Ha Ja Bo Ro Lo)
- Tomar Aami (Ganakrishti)
- Ek Mancha, Ek Jiban (Purba Pashchim)
- Sauda (Behala Bratyajon)
- Saudagarer Nouka (Sansriti)
- Bpajjanak (Ha Ja Ba Ra La)
- Equations (Blank Verse)
- Rani Kadambini (Nandikar)
- Chaar Adhyay (Sandarbha)
- Mulyo (Ballygung Bratyajon)
- Othoijol (Purba Paschim)
- Ek Nayoker Sesh Rat (Ha Ja Ba Ra La)
- Bilwamangal Kabya (Chakda Natyajan)
- Babai (usneek)
- Ferrari Fauj

== Awards ==
- 2013 - ABP Ananda Sera Bangali Award for Best Actor
- 2015 (Received)- Sangeet Natak Akademi Award
- The Bengali stage centenary Star Theatre award 2018
