= Haami =

2018 Indian Bengali film

- Directed by: Nandita Roy; Shiboprosad Mukherjee
- Written by: Nandita Roy; Shiboprosad Mukherjee
- Screenplay by: Nandita Roy
- Story by: Nandita Roy
- Produced by: Windows Production
- Cinematography: Supriyo Dutta
- Edited by: Moloy Laha
- Music by: Arindam Chatterjee; Anindya Chatterjee
- Production company: Windows Production House
- Distributed by: Windows Production; Eros International
- Release date: 11 May 2018
- Country: India
- Language: Bengali

Haami is a 2018 Bengali film directed by Nandita Roy and Shiboprosad Mukherjee. The movie is produced by Windows and was distributed regionally by the same. Haami is a tale of two friends, Bhutu and Chini, who come from entirely different backgrounds.

Before Haami, Nandita Roy and Shiboprosad Mukherjee came up with Ramdhanu which also dealt with the story of harried parents and what they go through in order to put their children in good schools. Haami could well be considered as a spiritual sequel to this, where Laltu and Mitali's characters are played by the same cast i.e. Shiboprosad Mukherjee and Gargi Roy Chowdhury. As per the figures provided by trade magazine, Film Companion, it was the highest grosser in Bengali cinema in 2018. The Malayalam rights of the movie was acquired by Rajesh Nair, who made Salt Mango Tree, based on the same film.

== Plot ==
Laltu Biswas (Shiboprosad Mukherjee) and Mitali Biswas (Gargi Roy Chowdhury) are the parents of Bhutu (Broto Banerjee). Mitali is a homemaker and Laltu is a middle-class furniture showroom owner. Their son, Bhutu, studies in one of the top schools of Kolkata, where he befriends the newly admitted Chini (Tiyasha Pal). Contrary to Bhutu's background, Chini comes from a highly upper class family where her parents, Srinjoy Sen (Sujan Mukhopadhyay) and Rina Sen (Churni Ganguly), are both into academics. Bhutu gets into a scuffle with a classmate, Ajatshotru (Abhiraj Karan), because of his antics, which then leads to a brawl between Mitali & Ajatshotru's mother Shyamoli (Koneenica Banerjee), the wife of the local councillor (Kharaj Mukherjee). One day, out of pure friendship, Bhutu gives a peck on Chini's cheeks. Chini ends up telling this to her class teacher. Keeping in mind Chini's misinterpretation of the incident, the school authorities summon Chini's parents as well as Bhutu's parents, which leads to a confrontation between them. The Sens, owing to their classist attitude & Mitali's bad reputation caused by her brawl with Shyamoli, decide to keep Chini away from Bhutu. After getting a good scolding from his mother, Bhutu is prohibited from speaking to Chini anymore and is stopped from sitting beside her at school, which hurts Chini. Soon their sections are also changed, as per the demands of Chini's parents. However, after watching someone getting married on a television soap, Bhutu decides to marry Chini by putting sindoor on her during playtime. Meanwhile, Ajatshotru witnesses this incident and reports it to the class teacher, who is again forced to take it up with the principal. Both set of parents are summoned again. Given that the incident occurred in midst of an atmosphere of mistrust following a false alarm of a student being sexually assaulted by a non-teaching staff of the school, Chini's parents, who misinterpret Bhutu's antics as sexual harassment under the influence of gossip fed by Shyamoli, demand that Bhutu be expelled from the school, while Mitali doubles down, accusing Chini of seducing her son. Though the parents quarrel with each other and the school principal, they realise at the end how innocent and pure Bhutu and Chini's bonding is. They realise their mistake of judging children from an adult point of view and reconcile with each other.

== Cast ==
- Broto Banerjee as Bodhisattwa Biswas/Bhutu
- Tiyasha Pal as Tanuruchi Sen/Chini
- Abhiraj Karan as Ajatshotru Rakshit/Kuchu
- Tanushree Shankar as Principal
- Aparajita Adhya as Arundhati, School Counsellor
- Shiboprosad Mukherjee as Laltu Biswas, Bhutu's father
- Gargi Roychowdhury as Mitali Biswas, Bhutu's mother
- Koneenica Banerjee as Shyamoli Rakshit, Ajatshotru's mother
- Kharaj Mukherjee as Dilip Rakshit - Ajatshotru's father and the local councillor
- Masood Akhtar as Chacha jaan, a longtime bus conductor who was falsely accused of sexually assaulting Jhumur Paul
- Sujan Mukhopadhyay as Srinjoy Sen, Chini's father
- Churni Ganguly as Rina Sen, Chini's mother
- Debolina Dutta as Jhumur Paul's mother, who raised the false alarm of her daughter being sexually assaulted
- Devlina Kumar as Sohini, Bhutu and Chini's teacher
- Shreyan Bhattacharya in a special appearance as himself

== Soundtrack ==
The music of the film is directed and composed by Anindya Chatterjee. Bhutu Bhaijan, the song based on Bhutu that became an overnight sensation, was composed by Arindam Chatterjee. All the other songs of the movie were sung by children, which is rare in Bengali cinema. Only a promotional song that is not in the film has been sung by Babul Supriyo. Every song of Haami was released on YouTube and other digital platforms and a special album was also released. The music of Haami also earned Mirchi Best Music Award of the Year (2018).

Haami

Soundtrack album by Arindam Chatterjee
- Released: 2018
- Recorded: 2018
- Genre: Feature film soundtrack
- Label: Eros International
- Producer: Windows Production House

Arindam Chatterjee chronology
Dhaka Attack (2017)	Haami (2018)	Fidaa (2018)

Singles from Haami
- 1. "Haami Title Track" Released: 23 Mar 2018; 2. "Bhutu Bhaijaan" Released: 30 Mar 2018; 3. "Khola Tiffin Box (sad)" Released: 14 Apr 2018; 4. "Tiffin box ( Happy)" Released: 24 Apr 2018; 5. "Chachaji" Released: 29 May 2018

All lyrics are written by Anindya Chatterjee.

No.	Title	Music	Singer	Length
1.	"Haami Title Track"	Anindya Chatterjee	Babul Supriyo, Anindya Chatterjee	2:36
2.	"Bhutu Bhaijaan"	Arindam Chatterjee	Shreyan Bhattacharya	3:24
3.	"Tiffin Box (Sad)"	Anindya Chatterjee	Swamantak Mukherjee, Aruna das	4:52
4.	"Tiffin box ( Happy)"	Anindya Chatterjee	Shreyan Bhattacharya, Ranita Banerjee	2:35
5.	"Chachaji"	Anindya Chatterjee	Shreyan Bhattacharya, Ranita Banerjee	3:14
6.	"Haami (Reprise)"	Anindya Chatterjee	Babul Supriyo, Anindya Chatterjee
7.	"Bhutu Bhaijaan (Reloaded)"	Arindam Chatterjee	Shreyan Bhattacharya

== Release and screening ==
Haami was released on 11 May 2018 and was premiered in Nandan. The film was initially shown in Navina Cinema and a few other halls after it was rejected by seven prime theatres of Kolkata. The movie ran in theatres for 100 consecutive days.

== Awards ==
- Most Popular film of the year by West Bengal Film Journalists' Association Awards(2018)
- Mirchi Best Music Award of the Year(2018)
- Most watched film all time by Hoichoi

- Best Music Album of the year -Best Music Composer of the year - Best Lyricist – Anindya Chatterjee - Best Female Vocalist of the year.- Aruna Das - Best Child Actor - Broto Banerjee

== Sequel ==
A sequel titled Haami 2 was released on 23 December 2022.
