= Bonnie Chakraborty =

Indian playback singer

- Origin: Indian
- Genres: Indian; Bollywood
- Occupations: Singer; Composer; Songwriter
- Formerly of: Krosswindz

Bonnie Chakraborty is an Indian playback singer. He was the lead vocalist of Kolkata based band Krosswindz until 1998. He has sung many songs in several languages including Hindi, Tamil and Bengali for various films.

== Career ==
Chakraborty teamed with Neil Mukherjee and formed a band, Kashti which was promoted by Zee Music. They produced an album of 8 songs that came and went unnoticed by the general public, although it was popular in the music circles of Mumbai. After three years the contract ended and the duo separated. Chakraborty moved on with the formation of another band, Oikyotaan along with Kartick das Baul, a baul singer from Guskara in West Bengal. He has four Bengali albums to his credit including three for the group Mohiner Ghoraguli, led by Gautam Chattopadhyay.

In 2011 he released Tagore Unbound, a Rabindra sangeet album with his wife, Usri Banerjee.

== Discography ==
| Year | Film | Song name | Composer | Notes |
|---|---|---|---|---|
| 2003 | Flavors | "Hum Tum" | Mahesh Mahadevan | |
| 2005 | Mangal Pandey - The Rising | Rasiya | A. R. Rahman | |
| 2007 | Summer 2007 | Sone Ki Porhi Main | Kalyani Malik | |
| 2008 | Jodhaa Akbar | Azeem-O-Shaan Shahenshah | A. R. Rahman | |
| 2009 | Dev D | Emotional Attyachar (Rock Version) | Amit Trivedi | |
| 2009 | Delhi-6 | Hey Kaala Bandar | A. R. Rahman | |
| 2009 | 99 | Soch Mat Dobara; 99 Theme Song | Shamir Tandon & Ashutosh Pathak | |
| 2009 | Agyaat | Jai Shiv Bum Shambu | Imran Bapi Tutul | |
| 2010 | No One Killed Jessica | Aali Re | Shantanu Moitra | |
| 2010 | Udaan | Motumaster Gas Ka Plastar | Amit Trivedi | |
| 2010 | Shukno Lanka | Hate Tomar Kaita Rekha | Debojyoti Mishra | Bengali Film |
| 2012 | Bapi Bari Jaa | Sahor Toke | Jeet Ganguly | Bengali Film |
| 2012 | Satyamev Jayate | Nikal pado Re Bandhu | Ram Sampath | TV series Season 1 |
| 2012 | Aalaap | Paa Paraa Paa; Chadhti Jawani | Agnee | |
| 2013 | C/O Sir | Sleeping Piller Raat | Raja Narayan Deb | Bengali film |
| 2013 | Bullett Raja | Saamne Hai Savera | Sajid–Wajid | |
| 2014 | Thirumanam Ennum Nikkah | Rayile Raa | M. Ghibran | Tamil film |
| 2014 | Buno Haansh | Zindagi Kahin Bhi Thamti Nahi | Shantanu Moitra | Bengali film |
| 2014 | Bobby Jasoos | "Jashn" | Shantanu Moitra | |
| 2016 | Bastu-Shaap | "Gache Gache Rod" | | Bengali film |
| 2024 | Bohurupi | "Dakatiya Banshi" | | Bengali film |

== Awards ==
- Filmfare Awards Bangla 2025 – Best Playback Singer (Male) for Shimul Palash from Bohurupi (Shared with Noni Chora Das Baul)
