= Alik Sukh =

2013 Indian Bengali film

- Theatrical release poster
- Directed by: Shiboprosad Mukherjee; Nandita Roy
- Written by: Suchitra Bhattacharya
- Screenplay by: Nandita Roy
- Based on: Alik Sukh by Suchitra Bhattacharya
- Produced by: Windows Production
- Starring: Debshankar Haldar; Rituparna Sengupta; Sohini Sengupta
- Cinematography: Sirsha Ray
- Edited by: Malay Laha
- Music by: Anindya Chatterjee; Nachiketa Chakraborty
- Release date: 19 July 2013
- Running time: 137 minutes
- Country: India
- Language: Bengali

Alik Sukh (English: Unreal Happiness) is a 2013 Bengali psychological thriller film directed by Shiboprosad Mukherjee and Nandita Roy. It is based an eponymous novel by Suchitra Bhattacharya. The film starrs Debshankar Haldar, Rituparna Sengupta and Sohini Sengupta among others.

Alik Sukh opened to mixed reviews from the critics and positive reviews from the audience. It ran in theatres over 50 days. On 15 September 2013, it was released in multiple states across India, outside of West Bengal.

== Plot ==
Dr. Kingshuk Guha, a renowned gynecologist, finds himself in a professional crisis when one of his patients, Kabita Mondol, dies on the operating table while he is away purchasing a luxury apartment for his family. Kabita's enraged husband and relatives attempt to mob the hospital. Upon hearing the news, Kingshuk's wife, Rumi, rushes to the hospital to support him. There, she sees Kabita's corpse lying unattended in the empty operating theater and begins to imagine that the dead woman is communicating with her.

Though well-off, happily married, and pregnant with their second child, Rumi starts to question her right to happiness, given that her husband is responsible for depriving another family of their loved one. She becomes emotionally distant from Kingshuk, who refuses to accept responsibility for Kabita's death. In turn, Kingshuk grows frustrated with Rumi's lack of support as he faces an investigation by a medical committee and a compensation claim of Rs 1,000,000 from Kabita's family. Their relationship deteriorates to the point where they stop speaking to each other, and eventually, Rumi leaves with their son to stay with her parents.

Kingshuk eventually reaches an out-of-court settlement with Kabita's family for Rs 300,000. Relieved and hoping to reconcile with Rumi, he calls her and informs her that he has "bought off the patient’s family." Rumi, devastated by Kingshuk's callousness and the lack of justice for Kabita, suffers a fall shortly after the call, leading to a miscarriage and severe abdominal hemorrhaging.

In a cruel twist of fate, Kingshuk finds himself in the same desperate position as Kabita's husband, as the medical team at the local hospital takes its time attending to Rumi. She survives, and a remorseful Kingshuk seeks her forgiveness, vowing to make amends. From Rumi's perspective, Kabita finally finds closure, and hopes for a happier future emerge.

== Cast ==
- Debshankar Haldar as Dr. Kingshuk Guha
- Rituparna Sengupta as Ramyani
- Sohini Sengupta as Kabita
- Biswanath Basu as Biswajit, Kabita's husband
- Saayoni Ghosh as Namita
- Kharaj Mukherjee as a lawyer

== Production ==
=== Development ===
In an interview to The Times of India, director Shiboprosad Mukherjee said that although the film is based on a novel, it was influenced by his father's death on 15 April 1994. Regarding his personal experience regarding the lives of doctors, he said,

It was Poila Baishak and my father suddenly complained of chest pain. I rushed him to a para-doctor and he asked us to shift Baba (father) to a hospital immediately as he had suffered a heart attack. I called an ambulance and took him to a hospital only to find that there were no attendants or doctors around as it was Poila Boishak! The few junior doctors present there couldn't do anything. When I finally got hold of a doctor, he was leaving for the day. He told me since it was a festive day, the hospital was low on staff and he couldn't help us. My father breathed his last that night. Whether it was family obligations or something else that was going through the doctor's mind, is a question that still haunts me as I lost my father for it.

=== Casting ===
After the Aparna Sen directorial Paromitar Ek Din (2000), this marked the second collaboration between Rituparna Sengupta and Sohini Sengupta. This also marked the first feature film for theatre artist Debshankar Haldar, in which he played the lead role.

=== Marketing ===
Alik Sukh's music launch event was held at the Bengal Club. The premiere of the film was held at Priya Cinema Hall in South Kolkata. The event was attended by previous collaborators with the director duo and other eminent actors from the Bengali film industry.

== Soundtrack ==
Soundtrack of Alik Sukh has been composed by Anindya Chatterjee and Nachiketa Chakraborty. The lyrics have been penned by Anindya Chatterjee.

No.	Title	Singer(s)	Length
1.	"MBBS"	Anindya Chatterjee	4:17
2.	"Ke Jane Thikana"	Nachiketa Chakraborty	3:47
3.	"Na Re Na Ore Mon"	Nachiketa Chakraborty	4:24
4.	"Raat Jaye"	Anindya Chatterjee	4:07
Total length:			16:35

== Reception ==
=== Critical reception ===
Madhusree Ghosh of Times of India rated the film 3.5/5 stars and noted "The credit of the film goes to the directors for being so selective in their choice of good actors." She appreciated Sohini's theatrical touches and body language, Debshankar's seasoned acting, Rituparna's vulnerable acting, Kharaj and Biswanath's supporting performances, and the direction but bemoaned Sohini's portrayal as Kabita, excessive melodrama and the forced scary background score.

Dr. Kunal Sarkar reviewed the film for Sangbad Pratidin and opined "Overall, it is a well-made, emotionally rich, and entertaining film." He appreciated the direction, their vision in presenting a sensitive issue associated with the medical profession on screen, the cinematography, background score and the storyline but bemoaned the weak acting.

Dibyendu Paul of Rhododendron reviewed the film and wrote "The writer tries excessively hard to bring out a startling feel. We’re certain that was not what the executives planned." He praised Debshankar's acting, the performances of Rituparna and Sohini, and Biswanath and Kharaj's performance in their respective supporting roles but criticized the poor writing of the character of Kabita, which he termed as "creepy and exaggerated". Abhilash Roy from Bangla Live reviewed the film and applauded the directors for displaying the poor medical system in our country.

A critic from Tollywood Dhamaka rated the film 6.75/10 stars and applauded the acting by the entire cast and the little details depicted in the film but bemoaned the sound and editing. A critic from Anandalok reviewed the film and praised the direction, performance of the lead actors and the background score but criticized Debshankar's repetitive dialogues and excessive hand movements, excessive melodrama, slow pace in the second half and the weirdly written character of Sohini.

== Accolades ==
Alik Sukh was premiered at the Marché du Film section in Cannes Film Festival in 2013. Nandita Roy and Shiboprosad Mukherjee received the Filmfare Awards East for Best Direction at the 1st Filmfare Awards East. At the same ceremony, Rituparna Sengupta won the Filmfare Award East for the Best Actress while Anindya Chatterjee received it for the Best Lyrics.
