= Chitra Sen =

Indian actress

- Born: Chitra Mandal; Calcutta, West Bengal, India
- Occupations: Actress; dancer
- Years active: 1951—present
- Spouse: Shyamal Sen
- Children: Kaushik Sen
- Relatives: Riddhi Sen (grandson)

Chitra Sen is an Indian actress and dancer predominantly known for her work in Bengali cinema, television and theatre. She made her debut in Madhu Bose's Shesher Kabita (1953) based on Tagore's novel of the same name. She played the female lead in Binoy Banerjee's social drama film Ponraksha (1954). In Swapnasandhani, she has worked with her son Kaushik Sen.

== Filmography ==
Year	Title	Role	Ref.
1953	Shesher Kabita	Surama	
1954	Nil Shari		
1954	Ponraksha	Anu	
1958	Joutuk		
1961	Komal Gandhar		
1959	Personal Assistant		
1992	City of Joy		
1993	Kanyadan		
1994	Unishe April	Boya	
1996	Bhoy		
1999	Anu		
2000	Daaybaddho		
2001	Cancer		
2002	Haraner Natjamai		
2003	Path		
2006	Je Jon Thake Majhkhane		
2017	61 Garpar Lane		
2019	Konttho		

== Plays ==
- Alakanandar Putra Kanya.
- Jalchabi (with Rangrup theatre group under the direction of Seema Mukhopadhyay)
- Maer Moto (based on a play of Kabita Singh directed by Mohit Chattopadhyay)
- Bhalo Rakkhosher Galpo (with Swapnasandhani)
- Aloka.

== Television ==
- Roilo Ferar Nimontron
- Arakshaniya
- Ranga mathay Chiruni
- Subarnalata (TV series)
- Boyei Gelo
- Rajjotok
- Mon Niye Kachakachi
- Aaj Aari Kal Bhaab
- Kundo Phooler Mala
- Andarmahal(2017–2019)
- Nakshi Kantha(2018–2020)
- Sreemoyee(2019–2021)
- Khorkuto (2022)
- Meyebela (2023)
