= Anindya Chatterjee =

Indian Bengali film director, music director, singer, lyricist, actor and producer

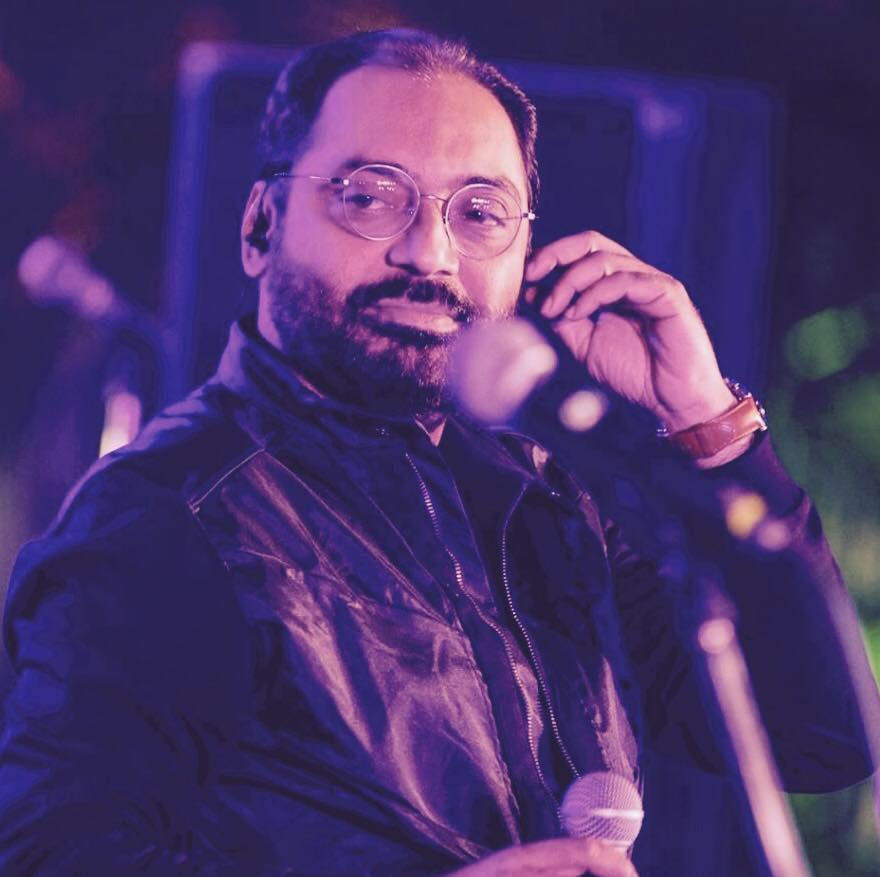
- Anindya Chatterjee
- Born: Kolkata, West Bengal, India
- Occupations: Film director; Music director; Lyricist; Producer; Actor
- Years active: 1989–present

Anindya Chatterjee is an Indian Bengali film director, music director, singer, lyricist, actor and producer based in Kolkata, West Bengal, India. He is the singer-lyricist of Bengali band Chandrabindoo. In recent times he has composed multifarious songs in Bengali mainstream films as an independent music director.

== Education ==
He is an alumnus of the Scottish Church Collegiate School. He earned an undergraduate degree from the Scottish Church College at the University of Calcutta. As a student at Scottish in the late 1980s, he was invited to perform at the college's annual fest Caledonia, following which he performed his composition Sweetheart. After the success of this song, he became initiated in the Kolkata college festival circuit. In 1989, the band Chandrabindoo was formed, by him along with his college mates Rajesh Bose, Upal Sengupta and Chandril Bhattacharya.

== Films ==
=== As director ===
| Denotes films that have not yet been released |

| Year | Film | Actors | Notes |
|---|---|---|---|
| 2015 | Open Tee Bioscope | Riddhi Sen, Rwitobroto Mukherjee, Surangana Bandyopadhyay, Dhee Majumder, Rajatava Dutta | |
| 2017 | Projapoti Biskut | Ishaa Saha, Aditya Sengupta, Shantilal Mukherjee | |
| 2018 | Manojder Adbhut Bari | Soumitra Chattopadhyay, Sandhya Roy, Abir Chatterjee | |
| 2021 | Prem Tame | Soumya Mukherjee, Sweta Mishra, Susmita Chatterjee | |

=== As actor ===
| Denotes films that have not yet been released |

| Year | Film | Role | Notes |
|---|---|---|---|
| 2003 | Shubho Mahurat | as Shubhankar | |
| 2013 | Satyanweshi | as Ajit | |
| 2016 | Praktan | as himself | |
| 2018 | Red Cycle | as himself | |
| 2019 | Durgeshgorer Guptodhon | Pinakpani Deb Roy | |
| 2021 | Amra 2GayTher | | |
| 2026 | Shwetkali 2 | | Zee5 |

=== As lyricist ===
| Denotes films that have not yet been released |

| Year | Film | Songs | Music director | Notes |
|---|---|---|---|---|
| 2008 | Antaheen | "All Songs" | Shantanu Moitra | Along with Chandril Bhattacharya, Won a National Film Award for Best Lyricst for the song 'Pherari Mon'. |
| 2009 | Prem Aamar | "Jage Re (Male)" | Jeet Gannguli | Along with Priyo Chattopadhyay, Gautam Sushmit |
| 2012 | Bapi Bari Jaa | "Chaap Nis Na" | Jeet Gannguli | Along with Prasen, Chandrani Gannguli, Srijato |
| 2012 | Aparajita Tumi | "All Songs" | Shantanu Moitra | Along with Chandril Bhattacharya, Neha Rungta |
| 2012 | Paanch Adhyay | 4 Songs – "Baavri", "Agontuk", "Uda jaay", "Phire paoar gaan" | Shantanu Moitra | Along with Chandril Bhattacharya |
| 2014 | Buno Haansh | "Anka Banka Alo Dhaka", "Bela Boye Jay" | Shantanu Moitra | Along with Srijato, Chandril Bhattacharya |
| 2016 | Praktan | "Moner Guptochar" | Himself | Along with Anupam Roy, Radha Raman |
| 2017 | Posto | "Jonaki" | Himself | |
| 2017 | Chaamp | "Tu Hi Hai Chaamp" (Title Track), "Maula Re" | Jeet Gannguli | Along with Raja Chanda, Raftaar, Anupam Roy |
| 2017 | (Bengali Puja song) | "Phire Aaye" | Jeet Gannguli | |
| 2017 | Haami | "All Songs" | Arindam Chatterjee & Himself | |
| 2017 | "Cockpit" | "mithe alo" | Arindam Chatterjee | along with prasen, koushik ganguly |
| 2019 | Konttho | "Bornoporichoy" | Anupam Roy & Himself | along with Prashmita Paul |
| 2025 | Aarii | "Aarii (Title Track)" | Himself | |
