= Nachiketa Chakraborty =

Indian Bengali singer-songwriter

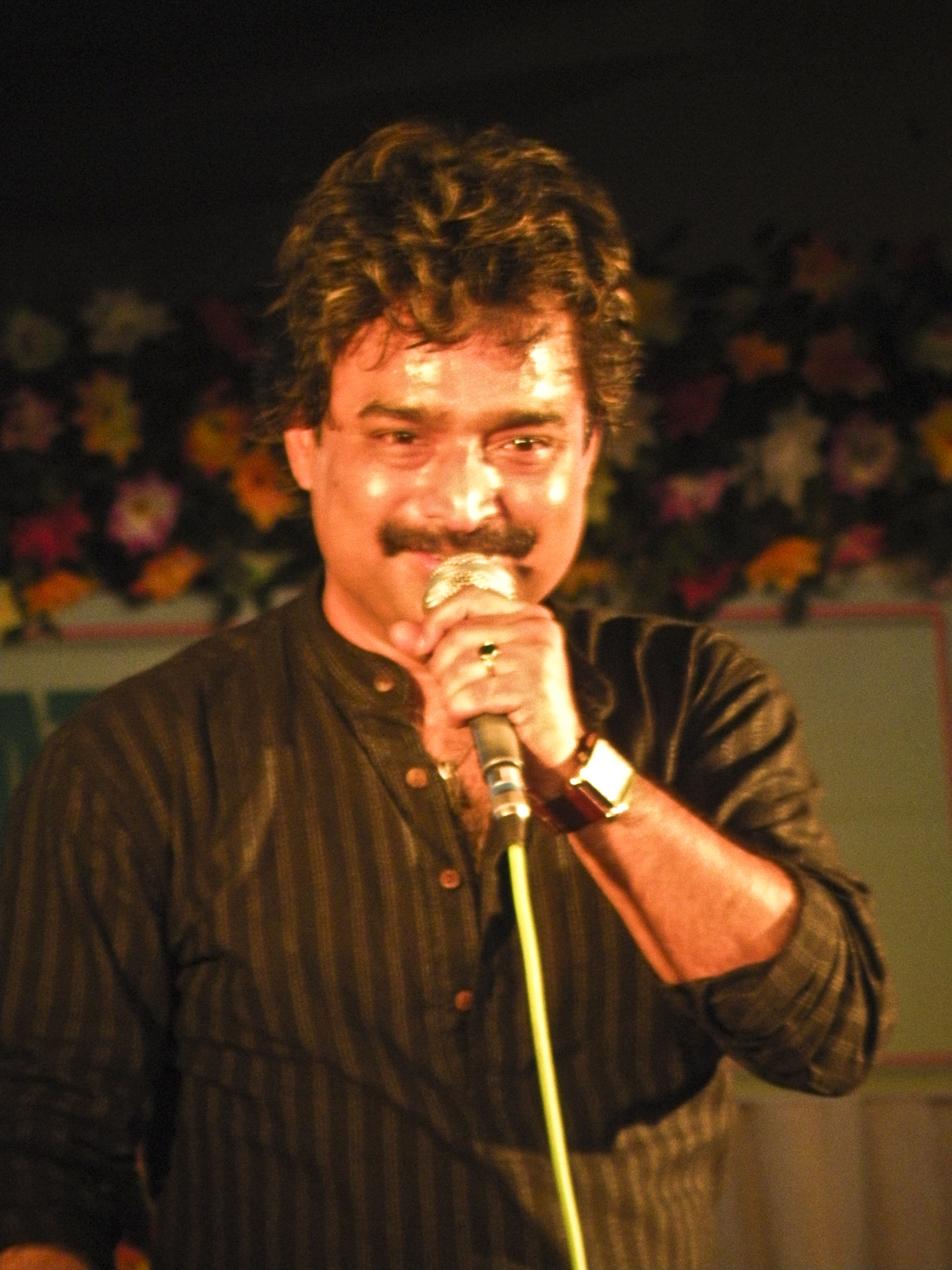
- Nachiketa performing in February 2010

Background information
- Also known as: Nochi
- Born: Nachiketa Chakraborty; 1 September 1964 (age 62); Calcutta, West Bengal, India
- Genres: Urban Folk, Indian Classical, Nachiketa Music
- Occupations: Singer; Songwriter; Playback Singer; Writer
- Instruments: Vocals, harmonium, guitar
- Years active: 1990–present
- Label: His Master's Voice
- Website: Official website

Nachiketa Chakraborty, simply known as Nachiketa, is an Indian singer-songwriter and playback singer known for his modern Bengali lyrics. He achieved fame in the early 1990s, with the release of his debut album Ei Besh Bhalo Achi.

== Early life ==
Nachiketa was born in Kolkata at Muktaram Babu Street. His father was Sakha Ranjan Chakravarti. His ancestral roots lie in Chechri Rampur village in Kathalia in Jhalokathi of Barisal, Bangladesh. His grandfather Lalit Mohan Chakravarti came to India before 1946. He started composing songs and performing live, as a student of Maharaja Manindra Chandra College in North Kolkata's Shyambazar.

== Works ==
=== Solo albums ===
- Ei Besh Bhalo Achi (1993) - His Master's Voice (Saregama)
- Ke Jay (1994) - Saregama
- Ki Hobe (1995) - Saregama
- Chol Jabo Toke Niye (1996) - Saregama
- Kuasha Jokhon (1997) - Saregama
- Amiee Pari! (1998) - Saregama
- Dalchhut (1999) - Saregama
- Daybhaar (2000) - Saregama
- Ekla Choltey Hoy (2002) - Saregama
- Mukhomukhi (2003) - Saregama
- Ei Agune Haath Rakho (2004) - Saregama
- Ekhon Tokhon (2005)
- Amar Kotha Amar Gaan (2005) - Aahir Music
- Tirjaak (2007) - Sagarika Music
- Ebar Nilanjan (2008)
- Haowa Bodol (2010) - Purple Music
- Sob Kotha Bolte Nei (2012)
- Asomoy (2012)
- Drishtikon (2014) - Dhoom Audio
- Balika (2005) - Soundtek
- Bonolata
- Din Bodoler Gan (2011)
- Ei Pratham, Ei Samay, Ei Gaan, Ei Dujan (1997)
- Fire Dekha
- Hothat Bristi (1998)
- Ishq Bawri (2012)
- Katakoty (2012)
- Shomoyer Danai
- Swapner Shohor
- Aay Deke Jay (2015)
- Benche Thakar Maane (2017)

=== Playback singer ===
- Jeevan Yudh (1997)
- Chaka (2000)
- Hothat Brishti (1998)
- Khelaghar (1999)
- Katakuti (2011)
- Shedin Chaitra Mash
- Mumbai Cutting (unreleased) (2009)
- Go for Goals (2009)
- 10:10 (2008)
- Khela (2008)
- The Bong Connection (2007)
- Omkara (2006)
- Netaji Subhas Chandra Bose: The Forgotten Hero (2005)
- Jackpot (2009)
- Challenge
- Josh (2010)
- Target (2010)
- Madly Bangaly (2009)
- Prem Amar (2009)
- Handa & Vonda (2011)
- Zulfiqar (2016)
- Mahanayika (2016)
- 61 No. Garpar Lane (2017)
- Onek Holo Ebar To Moro (2017)
- Bishorjon (2017)
- Posto (2017)
- Amar Aponjon (2017)
- Mission China (2017)
- Shororipu 2: Jotugriho (2021)
- Tonic (2021)
- Chine Badam (2022)
- Ishkabon (2022)

=== Music Director ===
- Hothat Bristi (1998)
- Khelaghar (1999)
- Hum (The Unity) (unreleased) (2009)
- Samudra Sakshi (2004)
- Go for Goals (2009)
- Katakuti
- Tumi Asbe Bole (2014)
- Mahanayika (2016)
- 61 No. Garpar Lane (2017)
- Shopno Dekhe Mon (2017) (Bengali Serial)
- Ajker Shortcut (2022)

=== Actor ===
- Kuasha Jakhan (1997) (Bengali Serial)
- Khelaghar (1999)
- Thager Ghar (Bengali Telefilm)
- Target (2010)
- Katakuti (2011)
- Mahanayika (2016)
- 61 No. Garpar Lane (2017)
- Shopno Dekhe Mon (2017) (Bengali Serial)
- Reunion (2018)
- Ajker Shortcut (2022)

== Controversy ==
In March, 2024, it was alleged on social media that the tune of Nachiketa's famous song Rajashri Tomar Jonno had been taken from album Nour El Ain of Egyptian singer Amr Diab. The music was copied without attribution.
