= Posto (film) =

2017 Indian Bengali film

- Posto film-release poster
- Directed by: Nandita Roy; Shiboprosad Mukherjee
- Written by: Nandita Roy
- Produced by: Atanu Raychaudhuri & Windows Production
- Starring: Soumitra Chatterjee; Jisshu Sengupta; Lily Chakravarty; Mimi Chakraborty; Paran Bandopadhyay; Sohini Sengupta
- Cinematography: Gopi Bhagat
- Music by: Anupam Roy
- Production company: Windows Production
- Distributed by: Eros International
- Release date: 12 May 2017
- Country: India
- Language: Bengali
- Box office: ₹7 crore (US$730,000)

Posto (Here, a name for the child character of film. Meaning: Poppy Seeds) is a 2017 Bengali Family drama film directed by Nandita Roy and Shiboprosad Mukherjee. The film features Soumitra Chatterjee, Jisshu Sengupta and Mimi Chakraborty. The film was released on 12 May 2017 in 100 theatres across West Bengal, India and overseas (United States, Canada, Japan, Dubai, United Kingdom, Netherlands) on the same day. The film received critical acclaim as it portrayed the relationships in a very subtle way. The film was remade in Hindi language by the same director-duo Nandita Roy and Shiboprosad Mukherjee named Shastry Virudh Shastry (2023) which was released on 3 November 2023.

== Plot ==
Arko, affectionately called Posto (Arghya Basu Roy), is a little boy raised by his grandparents—Dinen Lahiri (Soumitra Chatterjee) and Gouri Lahiri (Lily Chakraborty)—in Santiniketan. His parents, Arnab Lahiri (Jisshu Sengupta) and Sushmita Lahiri (Mimi Chakraborty), are both settled in Kolkata. They only visit their son once on the weekend. A clash between the grandparents and parents begins when the latter want to take away the child as the father gets an offer to start a restaurant business abroad. The relationship between the parents of Posto and his grandparents, which eventually sours and drags the kid into the courtroom.

== Cast ==
- Soumitra Chatterjee as Dinen Lahiri
- Jisshu Sengupta as Arnab Lahiri
- Lily Chakraborty as Gouri Lahiri
- Mimi Chakraborty as Sushmita Lahiri, Arnab's wife
- Paran Bandopadhyay as Alok, The lawyer and friend of Dinen Lahiri
- Argha Basu Roy as Arko / Posto
- Sohini Sengupta as Gauri Lahiri
- Siddartha Chatterjee as a Judge
- Malabika Sen as a Teacher

== Soundtrack ==
The soundtrack is composed by Anupam Roy, with lyrics by himself. Nachiketa Chakraborty won the Filmfare award for best playback singer (Male), 2018, for the song Keno Erom Kichu Holona. It’s a song about distance between relationships and Nachiketa’s melodious voice effectively brings forth the nuances contained in the composition.

Posto

Soundtrack album by Anupam Roy
- Released: 14 June 2017
- Recorded: 2017
- Genre: Feature film soundtrack
- Length: 23:46
- Language: Bengali
- Label: Windows Music
- Producer: Windows Music
External audio
- Audio Jukebox on YouTube

Track list
No.	Title	Singer	Length
1.	"Posto"	Anupam Roy	3:18
2.	"Jonaki"	Anindya Chatterjee	5:38
3.	"Home Shanti Home"	Prashmita Paul, Upal Sengupta	3:41
4.	"Keno erokom kichhu holo na"	Nachiketa Chakraborty	5:15
5.	"Sokatore"	Sharana Sengupta, Soumita Ghosh, Palashi Ghose, Shreyan Majumdar, Utsa Biswas, Shabnam Parvin	3:39
6.	"Daakghor"	Soumitra Chatterjee	2:15
Total length:			23:46

== Release ==
The movie released on 12 May 2017. Its theatrical release created quite a buzz. Posto was later made part of the Family Welfare course organised by the State. Nandu Ahuja, Senior VP, India Theatrical, Eros International Media Ltd, said, "History repeats itself as Posto, our third film with Shiboprosad and Nandita, is well on its way to become another blockbuster after Belaseshe and Praktan. We are happy with the response the film has received in Kolkata and hope the film will similarly woo audiences across the country."

== Box office ==
On the first day, the movie collection 2 million rupees (₹ 21 lakh). In the first four days, the film's earnings were 10 million (₹1 crore (US$100,000). In 1st 2 weeks, the collection breached 35 million (₹3.5 crores). After 17 days, the box office collection crossed ₹4.5 crores. After the 1st 3 weeks, the movie had done a business of ₹ 5 crores. At the end of 4 weeks, the movie had done a business of ₹ 5.5 crore from the state of West Bengal alone and a worldwide business of ₹ 8 crores.

== Remake ==
Shastry Viruddh Shastry is the remade Bollywood film with similar story starring Paresh Rawal and marking Mimi Chakraborty first Hindi debut film. The film released on 3 November 2023.
