= Konttho =

2019 Indian Bengali social drama film

- Film poster
- কণ্ঠ
- Directed by: Shiboprosad Mukherjee; Nandita Roy
- Starring: Shiboprosad Mukherjee; Paoli Dam; Jaya Ahsan; Chitra Sen; Koneenica Banerjee; Jimmy Tangree; Biplab Dasgupta; Paran Bandopadhyay; Tanima Sen
- Cinematography: Subhankar Bhar
- Edited by: Moloy Laha
- Music by: Anupam Roy; Anindya Chatterjee; Prasen
- Production company: Windows Production
- Release date: 10 May 2019
- Running time: 2 hours 24 minutes
- Country: India
- Language: Bengali

Konttho (English: Voice) is a 2019 Bengali drama film directed by Nandita Roy and Shiboprosad Mukherjee. The movie is produced by Windows Production.

== Plot ==
Konttho is a story of friendship, resilience, and the indomitable human spirit.

Arjun Mallick is a popular radio jockey whose warm personality and distinctive voice have earned him a devoted following. His career reaches new heights when he receives the prestigious Voice of the Year award. With a loving wife, Pritha, a son, and a successful career, Arjun appears to have an ideal life.

Before long, his perfect life comes to an absolute halt when he is diagnosed with Laryngeal cancer. The doctors had to perform Laryngectomy to save Arjun's life. Arjun's whole life comes crashing down. He feels distanced from everybody. However, as destiny would have it, he is introduced to Romila, a speech therapist. A vibrant character herself, Romila, is a divorcee who with her daughter, Saheli, is all set to return to her country, Bangladesh. However, circumstances make her accept Arjun as her patient. With Romila's help, Arjun turns around and accepts all the challenges thrown at him by her to learn how to speak again.

Throughout his therapy, Romila gives him daunting challenges to make him use his voice rather than relying on signs and writings. He gives his first slang in his new voice during a heated conversation with a taxi driver. He learns to speak with an esophageal voice. He cannot speak but improvises himself. This is the story of the struggle of a cancer patient and his undaunted spirit. He then takes up the job of an RJ with Laryngeal cancer and the show is a success.

== Cast ==
- Shiboprosad Mukherjee as RJ Arjun Mallik
- Paoli Dam as Pritha Mallik
- Jaya Ahsan as Romilla Chowdhury
- Koneenica Banerjee as Indrani
- Chitra Sen as Pishima
- Jimmy Tangree as Manoj
- Paran Bandopadhyay as Somnath Da
- Tanima Sen as Somnath's wife
- Barun Chanda as himself
- Usha Uthup as herself

== Production ==
Konttho is inspired by the life of Bibhuti Bhushan Chakraborty, whose life was one of trauma and triumph. He fought on despite losing his voice box. Chakraborty was detected with cancer of the larynx in 1972. Two years later, he went under the knife for the elimination of his voice box. The railway officer was “dumbfounded” when doctors told him he would never speak again, but he declined to give up without combat. So, he learned the technique of developing a speech of his own with the muscles of his food pipe. Medical science terms it as “oesophageal speech”. After months of practice, he perfected the technique and started with sounds, simple phonetic ones, to begin with, followed by a combination of words and then short sentences, and in no time Chakraborty started participating in conversations, leaving cancer specialists stunned. He was soon approached by experts at the Thakurpukur cancer hospital to teach fellow patients the art of speech after voice-box surgery.

== Remake ==
The film was remade in Malayalam titled as Meri Awas Suno starring Jayasurya, Manju Warrier, Sshivada was released on 2022.

== Soundtrack ==
No.	Title	Music	Singer	Length
1	"Alote Alote Dhaka"	Anupam Roy	Anupam Roy	05:25
2	"Tomar Jonmodine"	Anupam Roy	Tushar Debnath	03:01
3	"Obak Jole"	Prasen	Prasen	04:41
4	"Shobai Chup"	Prasen	Sahana Bajpaie	04:55
5	"Bornoporichoy"	Prabuddha Banerjee	Anindya Chattopadhyay & Prashmita Paul	04:44
