= Nandita Roy =

Indian filmmaker and screenwriter (born 1955)

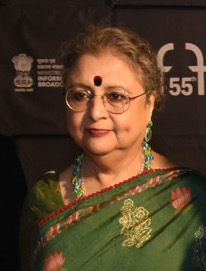
- Roy in 2024
- Born: 3 April 1955 (age 71); Vile Parle, Bombay, Maharashtra, India
- Education: Parle College (BEc); University of Mumbai (MEc)
- Occupations: Film director; Screenwriter; Editor; Film producer
- Years active: 1978—present
- Organisation: Windows Production
- Spouse: Nitish Roy (m. 1977)

Nandita Roy (pronounced [nondita rae̯]; born 3 April 1955) is an Indian filmmaker, screenwriter and editor who works in Bengali cinema. She made her directorial debut with Icche (2011), co-directed with Shiboprosad Mukherjee. Since then, the duo have co-written and co-directed films including Muktodhara (2012), Ramdhanu (2014), Bela Seshe (2015), Praktan (2016), Posto (2017), Haami (2018), Konttho (2019), Gotro (2019), Raktabeej (2023) and Bohurupi (2024).

Roy's collaborations with Shiboprosad Mukherjee are usually focused around family relationships and various social issues faced by the Indian middle-class. Along with Shiboprosad Mukherjee, she co-founded Windows Production in 2002. Subsequently, they have directed several commercially successful Bengali films, including Praktan, Bela Seshe and Bohurupi, which were among the highest-grossing Bengali films of their respective years.

Roy's films have been recognized for their educational and cultural significance. Icche was accepted into the National Film Archive of India for cultural and educational purposes. Icche, Muktodhara and Ramdhanu were included in the B.Ed. curriculum of Visva-Bharati University, while Icche and Muktodhara have been used in the Certificate Course on Legal and Psychological Counselling for Women in Distress. Aamar Boss was screened in the Panorama section of the 55th International Film Festival of India.

== Early life and education ==
Nandita Roy was born on April 3, 1955, in Vile Parle, Mumbai. She attended high school at St. Joseph's Convent High School, Mumbai. She graduated in Economics from Parle College, Mumbai. For a brief period, Roy worked as a teacher at St. Joseph's Convent Primary School. Later, she did her post-graduation in Economics from University of Mumbai, Santacruz. After completing her Masters, Roy moved to Kolkata, where she began her career in the television industry in the late 1970s.

== Career ==
=== 1978-2001: Early career and television ===
Roy's father wanted her to become a bank manager. However, from a young age, she was fascinated by filmmaker Subodh Mukherjee, her maternal aunt's husband, and aspired to write screenplays. After marrying filmmaker Nitish Roy in 1977 and moving to Kolkata, she began her professional career in 1978, as a glove-puppet operator and co-director on Agadoom-Bagadoom, a short puppet film for children. Through the 1980s and 1990s, Roy worked as a crew member in multiple films; working as an assistant editor, assistant director, set dresser, research assistant, and scriptwriter.

Roy was appointed as ETV Bangla's first Creative Head and Programming Manager. She played a significant role in establishing the network in West Bengal. For ETV Bangla, she created 19 original nonfiction programs, including Sreemoti, the first Bengali women's magazine program, and Ebong Rituparno, a celebrity chat show hosted by Rituparno Ghosh. Roy also started a series of one-hour television films by well-known directors for streaming on ETV Bangla.

=== 2002-2014: Windows Production and directorial debut ===
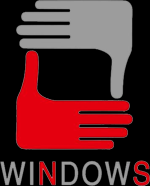
Windows Production, co-founded in 2002

Nandita Roy noticed Shiboprosad Mukherjee's performance in Ekushe Pa (1995) and suggested her husband Nitish Roy to cast him as the lead in his upcoming directorial Jamai No. 1. After two meetings, Shiboprosad was cast. Upon noticing Mukherjee's urge to work professionally in the films, Roy decided to collaborate with him. In 2002, Roy and Mukherjee co-founded Windows Production. They started producing television programmes. On the other hand, they were pitching their scripts to different production houses until Rituparno Ghosh agreed to produce Icche (2011).

After Icche, Roy and Mukherjee directed Hello Memsaheb (2011). The next year, they directed Muktodhara. It won the Anandalok Award for Best Film. In the same year they directed Accident, which was inspired by the aftermaths of a fatal real life road accident. It was selected for screening under the Indian Cinema Now section at the 18th International Kerala Film Festival in 2013.

Windows Production began producing films in 2013, with Alik Sukh being their first project. The film premiered at the Marché du Film of the Cannes Film Festival. It also earned them the Filmfare Awards East for Best Direction. In 2014, they directed Ramdhanu, a family drama based on modern parenting. In 2015, they directed Belaseshe starring Soumitra Chatterjee and Swatilekha Sengupta.

=== 2015-2021: Commercial breakthrough and family dramas ===
Their next release Praktan (2016), starred Prosenjit Chatterjee and Rituparna Sengupta in the lead roles. It marked their on screen collaboration after fourteen years. The film became the highest-grossing Bengali film of 2016. Its song "Tumi Jake Bhalobasho" received the 64th National Film Awards for Best Lyrics and Best Female Playback Singer.

In 2017, they directed Posto. It is a family drama about child custody and grandparent–grandchild relationships. In 2018, they released Haami, based on friendship and bullying among schoolchildren. In the same year, they directed the biographical drama Rosogolla, based on the life of confectioner Nobin Chandra Das. They released two films in 2019: Konttho and Gotro.

=== 2022-present: Mainstream success and genre expansion ===
In 2022, they directed Belashuru, a spiritual sequel to Belaseshe. It was released after Soumitra Chatterjee's death. In 2023, they directed Raktabeej, a political thriller inspired by real-life incidents. In 2024, they directed and produced Bohurupi. It's a heist thriller inspired by a gang of bank robbers in West Bengal. The film became one of the highest-grossing Bengali films of 2024. It won the Filmfare Awards Bangla for Best Film and Best Director.

In 2025, they directed Aamar Boss. It marked Rakhee Gulzar's return to Bengali cinema after more than two decades. The film was screened in the Panorama section of the 55th International Film Festival of India. Later in 2025, they directed Raktabeej 2, a sequel to Raktabeej. In 2026, they directed Phool Pishi O Edward. Her upcoming project Bohurupi: The Golden Daku is a spin-off to Bohurupi and is scheduled to release in Puja 2026.

== Filmmaking style ==
Roy's films primarily focus on family relationships and contemporary social issues like marriage, parenthood, ageing, education and intergenerational relationships. Film scholar Anindya Sengupta has described Roy and Mukherjee's work as "simple issue-based narratives" that appeal to family audiences. Srijit Mukherjee noted "They understand their audience and their psychology exceptionally well. Their dosage of sentimentality and Bengalihood is perfect."

== Filmography ==
Key
| † | Denotes films that have not yet been released |

- All films are in Bengali language, unless otherwise noted.
- All films are co-directed with Shiboprosad Mukherjee, unless otherwise mentioned.

| Year | Title | Director | Screenwriter | Notes | Ref. |
|---|---|---|---|---|---|
| 2011 | Icche | Yes | Yes | Feature directorial debut; based on the novel Iccher Gach by Suchitra Bhattacharya | |
| 2011 | Hello Memshaheb | Yes | Yes | | |
| 2012 | Muktodhara | Yes | Yes | Based on the real-life reformation of ex-convict Nigel Akkara | |
| 2012 | Accident | Yes | Yes | Based on the Kestopur Road Accident of 2008 | |
| 2013 | Alik Sukh | Yes | Yes | Based on the novel Aleek Shukh by Suchitra Bhattacharya | |
| 2014 | Ramdhanu | Yes | Yes | Based on the novel Ramdhanu Rang by Suchitra Bhattacharya | |
| 2015 | Bela Seshe | Yes | Yes | | |
| 2016 | Praktan | Yes | Yes | Based on the novel Ujaan by Suchitra Bhattacharya | |
| 2017 | Posto | Yes | Yes | | |
| 2018 | Haami | Yes | Yes | | |
| 2019 | Konttho | Yes | Yes | Inspired by the real-life story of cancer survivor Bibhuti Bhushan Chakraborty | |
| 2019 | Gotro | Yes | Yes | | |
| 2022 | Bela Shuru | Yes | Yes | Last film of Soumitra Chatterjee; was released posthumously, after his death | |
| 2022 | Haami 2 | Yes | Yes | | |
| 2023 | Raktabeej | Yes | Yes | Based on the 2014 Burdwan blast | |
| 2023 | Shastry Viruddh Shastry | Yes | Yes | Hindi-language remake of Roy's 2017 Bengali film Posto | |
| 2024 | Bohurupi | Yes | Yes | Inspired by the life of bank robber Sheikh Eklas, who had robbed 27 banks between 1998-2002 | |
| 2025 | Aamar Boss | Yes | Yes | Inspired by real-life corporate day-care initiatives | |
| 2025 | Raktabeej 2 | Yes | No | Inspired by the security challenges during former Indian President Pranab Mukherjee's 2013 visit to Bangladesh | |
| 2026 | Phool Pishi O Edward | Yes | No | Inspired from Agatha Christie's Miss Marple's character | |
| 2026 | Bohurupi: The Golden Daku | Yes | Yes | Spin-off of Bohurupi | |
| 2027 | Bohurupi 3 | Yes | Yes | Spin-off of Bohurupi: The Golden Daku | |

== Accolades ==
| Year | Award | Ceremony | Category | Work | Result | Ref. |
|---|---|---|---|---|---|---|
| 2012 | Anandalok Awards | 14th Anandalok Award | Best Film | Muktodhara | Won | |
| 2014 | Filmfare Awards East | 1st Filmfare Awards East | Best Direction | Alik Sukh | Won | |
| 2014 | Filmfare Awards East | 1st Filmfare Awards East | Best Film | Alik Sukh | Nominated | |
| 2016 | Sera Bangali Awards | 12th Sera Bangali Awards | Sera Bangali (Direction) | —N/a | Won | |
| 2016 | Zee Cine Awards | 16th Zee Cinema Awards | Best Bengali Film | Belaseshe | Won | |
| 2016 | International Business Film Awards | —N/a | Highest Grossing Film | Praktan | Won | |
| 2017 | Filmfare Awards East | 2nd Filmfare Awards East | Best Film | Praktan | Nominated | |
| 2017 | Filmfare Awards East | 2nd Filmfare Awards East | Best Director | Praktan | Nominated | |
| 2017 | Zee Cine Awards | 17th Zee Cinema Awards | Best Bengali Film | Praktan | Won | |
| 2017 | WBFJA Awards | 1st WBFJA Award | Best Director | Praktan | Nominated | |
| 2017 | WBFJA Awards | 1st WBFJA Award | Most Popular Film | Praktan | Won | |
| 2020 | WBFJA Awards | 4th WBFJA Award | Most Popular Film | Konttho | Nominated | |
| 2021 | Filmfare Awards Bangla | 4th Filmfare Awards Bangla | Best Film | Konttho | Nominated | |
| 2021 | Filmfare Awards Bangla | 4th Filmfare Awards Bangla | Best Director | Konttho | Nominated | |
| 2023 | WBFJA Awards | 6th WBFJA Awards | Most Popular Film | Belashuru | Nominated | |
| 2024 | Filmfare Awards Bangla | 7th Filmfare Awards Bangla | Best Film | Raktabeej | Nominated | |
| 2024 | Filmfare Awards Bangla | 7th Filmfare Awards Bangla | Best Director | Raktabeej | Nominated | |
| 2024 | Filmfare Awards Bangla | 7th Filmfare Awards Bangla | Best Original Story | Raktabeej | Nominated | |
| 2024 | WBFJA Awards | 7th WBFJA Award | Most Popular Film | Raktabeej | Nominated | |
| 2025 | WBFJA Awards | 8th WBFJA Awards | Most Popular Film | Bohurupi | Nominated | |
| 2025 | Filmfare Awards Bangla | 8th Filmfare Awards Bangla | Best Film | Bohurupi | Won | |
| 2025 | Filmfare Awards Bangla | 8th Filmfare Awards Bangla | Best Original Story | Bohurupi | Nominated | |
| 2025 | Filmfare Awards Bangla | 8th Filmfare Awards Bangla | Best Director | Bohurupi | Won | |

== Personal life ==
Roy married filmmaker and production designer Nitish Roy in 1977. They have a son. In an interview with The Times of India, Roy said that after relocating from Mumbai to Kolkata for work, she was away for much of her son's childhood, a decision she later described as one of her greatest personal regrets. Meanwhile, her husband, Nitish Roy, was in Hyderabad working on the development of the Ramoji Film City. As a result, their son grew up with limited parental presence. Roy also added that she lost her parents at a young age and had to raise her younger sister, who is thirteen years her junior.

== Reception and legacy ==
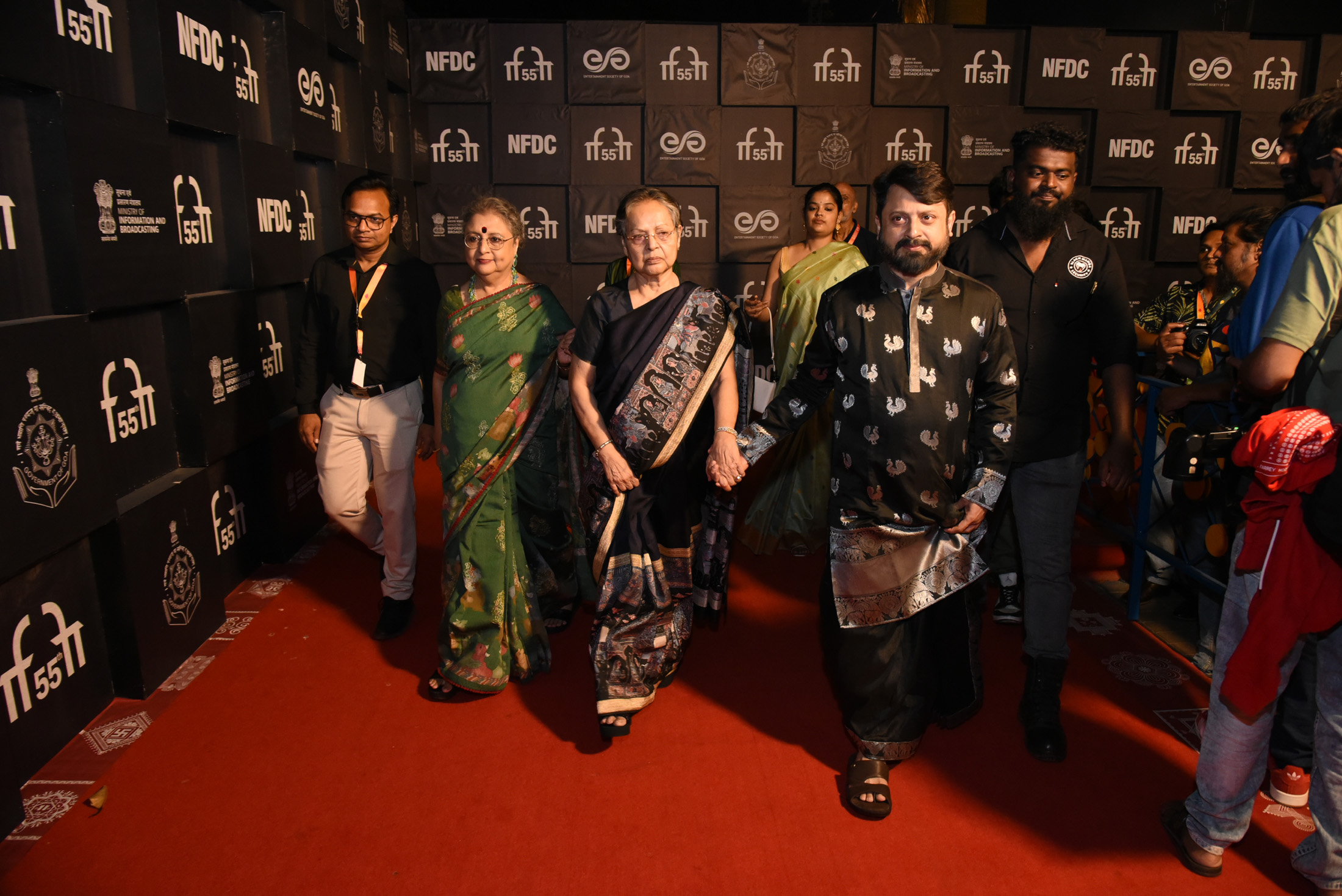
Nandita Roy and Shiboprosad Mukherjee with Rakhee Gulzar, at the red carpet of the 55th International Film Festival of India in November 2024

Icche was accepted into the National Film Archive of India for cultural and educational purposes. Icche, Muktodhara and Ramdhanu were later incorporated into the B.Ed. curriculum of Visva-Bharati University, while Icche and Muktodhara were included in the Certificate Course on Legal and Psychological Counselling for Women in Distress at the University of Calcutta.

PVR Cinemas screened Icche at their theatres in Kolkata, Delhi and Mumbai as part of their Indian Panorama Film Festival. Muktodhara was screened at the Rashtrapati Bhavan for the then President of India, Pranab Mukherjee. Accident was selected for screening at the 18th International Kerala Film Festival in 2013. Alik Sukh was premiered at the Marché du Film section in Cannes Film Festival in 2013. In 2025, Aamar Boss was screened in Panorama section of the 55th International Film Festival of India.
