= Muktodhara =

2012 Indian Bengali film

- Film poster
- Directed by: Shiboprosad Mukherjee and Nandita Roy
- Screenplay by: Nandita Roy
- Story by: Nandita Roy
- Produced by: Bachchu Biswas; Atanu Raychaudhuri
- Starring: Rituparna Sengupta; Nigel Akkara; Debshankar Haldar; Bratya Basu
- Cinematography: Anil Singh
- Edited by: Malay Laha
- Music by: Joy Sarkar and Surojit Chatterjee
- Release date: 3 August 2012 (West Bengal)
- Running time: 160 minutes
- Country: India
- Language: Bengali

Muktodhara is a 2012 Indian Bengali-language prison film directed by Shiboprosad Mukherjee and Nandita Roy. This is a story about the prisoners of a presidency correctional home, who all have a dark past life but here they are being reformed day by day.

== Plot ==
Niharika Chatterjee is the wife of public prosecutor Arindam Chatterjee. Arindam is a dominating husband and a male chauvinist. Niharika is unhappy with her married life. They both have a sweet little child who is deaf and dumb. Niharika organises a party for girls who are physically challenged like her own daughter. There, she meets the new Inspector General of correctional cells of West Bengal, Mr. Brij Narayan Dutta. The latter informs Niharika of his plans and ideas of reforming convicts of the correctional cells. Being aware of Niharika's talent and skills, he requests Niharika to help him organize an event with the prisoners. Niharika agrees to the proposal with a condition that her husband needs to be kept in the dark. One day, while they were having a rehearsal, Niharika wishes to stage Rabindranath Tagore's Valmiki-Pratibha involving the inmates of the correctional cells. Niharika informs Mr. Brij Narayan Dutta about it, who likes the idea and approves the proposal. In the cellular jail, Yusuf Mohammad is a very well-known criminal. He is accused of murder, kidnapping, et al. Mr. Brij Narayan Dutta wants him to be in the play. He succeeds in convincing Yusuf Mohammad. It is he who later becomes Niharika's main protagonist in the stage play. Yusuf Mohammad gradually changes as Niharika keeps training them. They plan to escape from the correctional home on the day of the play. But, the feeling of guilt engulfs Yusuf Mohammad and though they get out of the correctional home through a tunnel, they return and complete the play.

== Cast ==
- Rituparna Sengupta as Niharika Chatterjee
- Nigel Akkara as Yusuf Mohd Khan
- Bratya Basu as Arindam Chatterjee
- Debshankar Haldar as Brij Narayan Dutta
- Kharaj Mukherjee as Lakhan Panda
- Suchitra Chakraborty as Spriha
- Shiboprosad Mukherjee as Happy Singh
- Shambhunath Shaw as Nagen
- Arjun Sharma as Firdous
- Sarit Shekhar Banerjee as Shyamal
- Milan Kundu as Babu

== Production ==
Nigel Akkara was a hardened criminal, who had resisted all attempts of reformation till a renowned dancer visited the Presidency Correctional Home and began a therapy session. Alokananda Ray decided to stage the dance drama, Valmiki Pratibha, by Nobel laureate Rabindranath Tagore. The actors were selected from among jailbirds and Nigel played the lead role of dacoit Ratnakar, who transforms into sage Valmiki. That play transformed Nigel in real life. It also helped in opening new avenues for him following his release from prison in 2009 after serving a nine-year term. “I was mesmerized by the acceptance that I got after Valmiki Pratibha. Sometimes, looking at my past, I have wondered whether I deserve such love and affection,” said Nigel, who now owns a cleaning and security agency and employs several former convicts. Nigel's big break came when he got the chance to play the lead role opposite Rituparna Sengupta in Muktodhara.

Muktodhara is the first film in the history of Indian cinema to be made on culture therapy.

== Soundtrack ==
All tracks are written by Surojit Chatterjee and Kamolini Chatterjee.

No.	Title	Singer(s)	Length
1.	"Gunti"	Silajit Majumdar, Raghav Chatterjee, Mir Afsar Ali
2.	"Alo"	Surajit Chatterjee
3.	"Dour Dour"	Rupam Islam and Surajit Chatterjee
4.	"Muktodhara theme song"	Surajit Chatterjee
5.	"National anthem"	Inmates of Dumdum correctional home

== Release and reception ==
The film was screened at the Rashtrapati Bhavan after the then-president of India Pranab Mukherjee's wife wanted to watch the film. The The film was well received by critics.

A critic from The Telegraph wrote, "Muktodhara is a beautifully crafted film where all aspects of movie-making come together as a homogenous entity. It’s a must, must-see film for the cineaste and commoner alike".
