= List of Indian Bengali films of 2014 =

This is a list of Bengali language films released in India in the year 2014.

== January–March ==
Opening		Title	Director	Cast	Genre	Ref.
J A N U A R Y	3	Doorbeen	Swagato Chowdhury	Rangeet, Diptodeep, Ahana, Soumitra Chatterjee, Sabyasachi Chakraborty, Shantilal Mukherjee, Anjana Basu, Aparajita Auddy, Aritra Dutta Banik	Thriller	
J A N U A R Y	3	Hridayer Shabdo	Sushanta Pal Choudhury	Aviraj, Pamela Mondal, Biswajit Chakraborty, Samrat Mukherjee, Sukanta Mondol, Anuradha Roy, Debapriya, Runa Choudhury	Romance	
J A N U A R Y	3	Once Upon a Time in Kolkata	Satarupa Sanyal	Ritabhari Chakraborty, Ronnie Chakraborty, Nimisha Dey Sarkar, Anindya Banerjee, Sudip Mukherjee, Dwijen Bandyopadhyay, Rajatava Dutta, Debdut Ghosh	Thriller	
J A N U A R Y	17	Jaatishwar	Srijit Mukherji	Prosenjit Chatterjee, Jisshu Sengupta, Swastika Mukherjee, Abir Chatterjee, Kharaj Mukherjee, Riya Sen, Mamata Shankar, Ananya Chatterjee, Anupam Roy, Rahul Banerjee, Sumit Samaddar, Tamal Ray Chowdhury, Rupam Islam, Kabir Suman, Dwijen Banerjee, Sujan Mukherjee	Musical/Historical drama	
J A N U A R Y	17	Kartooz	Panna Hossain	Pasha, Sumita Chatterjee, Anindita Chatterjee, Faruque Azam, Mallinath Datta, Manawar Aftab, Meera Jasmine	Action	
J A N U A R Y	17	Neellohit	Bishnu Palchaudhuri	Samadarshi Dutta, Jhilik Bhattacharya, Rohan Bhattacharjee, Asim Mukherjee, Chanda Chatterjee, Kamalika Banerjee, Monu Mukhopadhyay, Parthasarathi Deb	Drama/Romance	
J A N U A R Y	17	Strings of Passion	Sanghamitra Chaudhuri	Zeenat Aman, Rajesh Sharma, Shubh Mukherji, Indrani Haldar, Avalok Nagpal, Amit Trishaan, Paru Gambhir, Sangita Sonali, Ekavali Khanna, Saqi	Drama	
J A N U A R Y	31	Bangali Babu English Mem	Rabi Kinagi	Mimi Chakraborty, Soham Chakraborty, Rajatava Dutta	Comedy/Romance	
J A N U A R Y	31	Chokher Paani	Sarfaraz Alam	Bidita Bag, R. Badree, Ashok Biswanathan, Dweep Mithun, Heerok Das, Ronjini Chakraborty, Tanushree Dutta, Tridib Ghosh	Drama	
J A N U A R Y	31	Sare Chuattar Ghosh Para	Soumo, Supriyo Dutta	Arnab Banerjee, Ginia Ghosh, Pamela Mondal, Parthasarathi Chakraborty, Pulakita Ghosh	Comedy	
J A N U A R Y	31	The Royal Bengal Tiger	Deb Bera	Jeet, Abir Chatterjee, Priyanka Sarkar, Shraddha Das	Action	
F E B R U A R Y	7	Chaya Manush	Arindam Dey	Paoli Dam, Parambrata Chatterjee, Kaushik Ganguly, Raima Sen, Soumitra Chatterjee	Horror/Thriller	
F E B R U A R Y	7	Masoom	Parthasarathi Joardar & Sanjib Sarkar(Music Director)	Aakash Chowdhury, Ritika, Arijit Guha, Krishnokishore Mukherjee, Manjushree Ganguly, Mousumi Saha, Sabyasachi Chakrabarty, Sudipta Chakraborty	Drama/Romance	
F E B R U A R Y	7	Singur: A Rescue Operation	Rajeev Gupta	Anushree Basu, Mainak Bhaumik, Anuj Agarwal, Debjit Kushari, Deepak Agrawal, Deepika Dey, Gargi Banerjee, Jamaluddin Shams, Krishnakali Ganguly, Kunal Purkait, Niladri Halder, Pradeep Dey	Drama/Thriller	
F E B R U A R Y	14	Obhishopto Nighty	Birsa Dasgupta	Paoli Dam, Indraneil Sengupta, Parambrata Chatterjee, Tanusree Chakraborty, Rahul Banerjee, Priyanka Sarkar, Neel Mukherjee, Bhaswar Chattopadhyay, Locket Chatterjee, Laboni Sarkar, Tanima Sen	Fantasy	
F E B R U A R Y	21	Biye Not Out	Abhijit Guha, Sudeshna Roy	Rituparna Sengupta, Tota Roy Chowdhury, Chaiti Ghoshal, Biswajit Chakraborty, Abhijit Guha, Abhrajit Chakraborty, Sudeshna Roy, Arunava Mukherjee, Phalguni Chatterjee	Drama/Romance	
F E B R U A R Y	21	Taan	Mukul Roy Choudhury	Rituparna Sengupta, Sumanto Chattopadhyay, Chandan Sen, Debdut Ghosh, Debolina Dutta, Kaushik Sen, Nandini Chatterjee, Pamela Bhutoria, Rajesh Sharma	Drama	
F E B R U A R Y	28	10th July	Ratul Ganguly	Chiranjeet, Rituparna Sengupta, Abhrajit Chakraborty, Anushka Nandi, Debashree Roy, Dulal Lahiri, Kanchana Moitra, Rupa Bhattacharya	Drama/Romance	
F E B R U A R Y	28	Jodi Love Dile Na Praane	Abhijit Guha, Sudeshna Roy	Abir Chatterjee, Ananya Chatterjee, Alokananda Roy, Arjun Chakrabarty, Biswajit Chakraborty, Kaushik Sen, Tridha Choudhury	Drama/Romance	
M A R C H	14	Pendulum (2014 film)	Soukarya Ghosal	Radhika Apte, Doelpakhi Dasgupta, Samadarshi Dutta, Rajatava Dutta, Rajesh Sharma, Shantilal Mukherjee, Sreelekha Mitra, Subhasish Mukhopadhyay	Drama	
M A R C H	14	Aami Je Tomaar	Sanjeev Rai	Dheeraj Pandit Sharma, Mukul Nag, Suporna Malkar, Abhishek Chatterjee, Buddhadeb Bhattacharjee, Indrani Samantha, Madhumita Sarkar, Poushali Dutta	Thriller	
M A R C H	14	Path Ghat	Partha Ganguly	Joy Sengupta, Moubani Sorcar, Biswanath Basu, Biswajit Chakraborty, Debdut Ghosh	Comedy	
M A R C H	21	Bhoot Bhooturey Samuddurey	Swapan Ghosal	Bhaswar Chattopadhyay, Manoj Mitra, Paran Bandopadhyay	Mystery	
M A R C H	28	Aalo Chhaya	Anasuya Samanta	Anasuya Samanta, Manajit Boral, Riya Mukherjee, Sanghamitra Bandyopadhyay, Anamika Saha, Bibhu Bhattacharya, Ramaprasad Banik, Soumitra Chatterjee, Indrani Mukherjee	Drama/Romance	
M A R C H	28	Teen Patti	Dipayan Mondal, Rehana Parveen Jenny	Indraneil Sengupta, Pooja Bose, Rimjhim Mitra, Ritwick Chakraborty, Ushasie Chakraborty, Alokesh Mitra, Argha Basu, Chiradip Chowdhury, Koushik Roy, Nitya Ganguly, Saptarshi Ray, Sharmistha Banerjee, Subhasis Ghosh	Romance/Thriller	

== April–June ==
Opening		Title	Director	Cast	Genre	Ref.
A P R I L	4	Na Jene Mon	Abhishek Roy & Sanjib Sarkar(Music Director)	Prince Abhishek Roy, Pamela Mondal, Mrinal Mukherjee, Raju Thakkar	Drama	
A P R I L	4	Picnic	Raj Mukherjee	Arjun Chakraborty, Sundeep	Drama/Romance	
A P R I L	11	Chirodini Tumi Je Amar 2	Soumik Chatterjee	Arjun Chakrabarty, Urmila Mahanta, Bihu Mukherjee, Ena Saha, Kharaj Mukherjee	Romance/Thriller	
A P R I L	11	Bharaate	Anindya Ghosh	Rituparna Sengupta, Rajdeep Gupta, Arunima Ghosh	Drama/Thriller	
A P R I L	18	Take One	Mainak Bhaumik	Swastika Mukherjee, Rahul Banerjee, Arindam Sil, Vikramjit Chaudhury, Anwesha Mukherjee	Drama	
A P R I L	18	Kencho Khurte Keute	Sanghamitra Chaudhuri	Amitabha Bhattacharya, Pallavi Chatterjee, Krishnokishore Mukherjee, Papiya Devarajan, Abhiraj, Pamela	Drama	
A P R I L	25	Apur Panchali	Kaushik Ganguly	Parambrata Chatterjee, Parno Mittra, Gaurav Chakrabarty, Ritwick Chakraborty, Ardhendu Banerjee	Drama	
M A Y	9	Window Connection	R. K. Gupta	Aryann Bhowmik, Tanusree Chakraborty, Biswajit Chakraborty, Kanchan Mullick, Rajat Ganguly, Rita Koiral, Sunil Kumar	Psychological thriller	
M A Y	9	The Nagorik	Narugopal Mandal	Kalyan Chaterjee, Kallyan, Bhola Tamong, Rama Guha, Debraj Roy, Soma Chakraborty, Raju Majumder, Subhajit Kar, Sumana Das & Others	Drama	
M A Y	16	Ami Shudhu Cheyechi Tomay	Ashok Pati	Ankush Hazra, Subhashree Ganguly, Misha Sawdagor, Symon Sadik	Drama/Romance	
M A Y	16	Baari Tar Bangla	Rangan Chakravarty	Saswata Chatterjee, Raima Sen, Tulika Basu, Sumit Samaddar, Shantilal Mukherjee	Comedy	
M A Y	30	Arundhati	Sujit Mondal (director); N.K. Salil (screenplay)	Koel Mallick, Indraneil Sengupta, Rahul Banerjee, Debshankar Haldar, Soma Chakraborty	Drama	
J U N E	6	Game	Baba Yadav	Jeet, Subhashree Ganguly	Action/Thriller	
J U N E	6	Ramdhanu	Shiboprosad Mukherjee, Nandita Roy	Shiboprosad Mukherjee, Gargi Roychowdhury	Drama/Family	
J U N E	13	Mangrove	Sourav Mukhopadhyay	Nijel Okara, Arpita Mukherjee, Dulal Lahiri, Rakhi Sawant.Dolon Roy, Satinath Mukherjee, Chitra Sen	Social Story /family	
J U N E	13	Chaar	Sandip Ray	Saswata Chatterjee, Paran Bandopadhyay, Subhrajit Dutta, Sreelekha Mitra, Pijush Ganguly, Rajatava Dutta, Sudipta Chakraborty, Abir Chatterjee, Koel Mallick	Anthology/Thriller	
J U N E	20	Aagun Pakhi	Shubhrajit Mitra	Rituparna Sengupta, Anindya Chakraborty, Ankita Chakraborty, Kharaj Mukherjee, Rajesh Sharma, Sabyasachi Chakraborty, Sagnik Chatterjee, Shantilal Mukherjee	Drama	
J U N E	20	Buno Haansh	Aniruddha Roy Chowdhury	Dev, Srabanti Chatterjee, Tanusree Chakraborty, Anindya Pulak, Arindam Sil, Gargi Roy Choudhury, Moon Moon Sen, Shankar Chakraborty, Sudipta Chakraborty, Subhrojeet Dutta	Crime/Thriller	
J U N E	20	Bonku Babu	Anindya Bikash Dutta	Arjun Chakraborty, Saswata Chatterjee, Arunima Ghosh	Comedy	

== July–September ==
Opening		Title	Cast and crew	Production Company	Genre	Ref.
J U L Y	4	Golpo Holeo Shotti	Birsa Dasguptav (Director), Soham Chakraborty, Mimi Chakraborty	Shree Venkatesh Films	Suspense	
J U L Y	11	Hrid Majharey	Ranjan Ghosh (Director), Abir Chatterjee, Raima Sen, Indrasish Roy, Barun Chanda, Arun Mukherjee, Sohag Sen, Tamal Roychowdhury	Piyali Films	Romance	
J U L Y	25	Bindaas	Rajiv Kumar Biswas (Director), Dev, Srabanti Chatterjee, Sayantika Bannerjee	Shree Venkatesh Films, Jalsha Movies Production	Action	
A U G U S T	8	Highway	Koel Mallick, Parambrata Chatterjee	Sudipto Chattopadhyay	Romance	
A U G U S T	15	Borbaad	Bonny Sengupta, Rittika Sen	Raj Chakraborty	Drama	
A U G U S T	29	27B Beadon Street	Biswanath Chakraborty (director/screenplay); Olisha, Sambit, Soumitra Chatterjee, Debraj Roy, Sanghamitra Bandyopadhyay, Tamal Roy Chowdhury, Bodhisatya Majumdar	Subhom Movies	Drama	
A U G U S T	29	Action	Sayantan Mukherjee (director/screenplay); Om, Barkha Bisht Sengupta, Megha Chakraborty, Nusrat Jahan, Kharaj Mukherjee, Swagata Mukherjee	T. Sarkar Productions	Drama, romance	
S E P T E M B E R	2	Asha Jaoar Majhe	Aditya Vikram Sengupta (director/screenplay); Ritwick Chakraborty, Basabdutta Chatterjee	For Films	Drama	
S E P T E M B E R	5	Aamar Aami	Orko Sinha (director/screenplay); Arunima Ghosh, Biswanath Basu, Bhaskar Banerjee, Indrasish Roy, Jhilik Bhattacharjee, Kamalika Banerjee, Phalguni Chatterjee, Rahul Banerjee, Rajdeep Gupta, Sanjay Biswas, Upal Sengupta, Hindol Bhattacharjee, Ayush Das, Debleena Sen	Reel & Real Motion Pictures / Eskay Movies	Drama	
S E P T E M B E R	5	Aranyer Itikotha	Anagh Ranjan Pashi (director/screenplay); Kaushik Chakraborty, Zenia Deb, Biswajit Chakraborty, Deepankar De, Paran Bandopadhyay, Santana Bose	Arrahs Production	Drama	
S E P T E M B E R	12	Gogoler Kirti	Ahjit Ghosh, Vikram Chatterjee	Pompy Ghosh Mukherjee	Children's	
S E P T E M B E R	19	Aak Ek Ke Dui	Drono Acharya (director); Paramita Munshi (screenplay); Bratya Basu, Sudipta Chakraborty, Biswanath Basu, Debesh Chattopadhyay, Neel Mukherjee, Prasun Gayen, Raju Majumdar, Sagnik Chatterjee	AAA Arts	Drama	
S E P T E M B E R	19	Akkarshan	Debraj Sinha (director/screenplay); Rituparna Sengupta, Samadarshi Dutta, Bhaskar Banerjee, Kharaj Mukherjee, George Baker, Rajatava Dutta, Rupam Islam, Srabanti Banerjee, Ferdous Ahmed	Shivam Productions	Drama	
S E P T E M B E R	26	Bachchan	Raja Chanda (director); N.K. Salil (screenplay); Jeet, Aindrita Ray, Payel Sarkar, Ashish Vidyarthi, Mukul Dev, Kanchan Mullick, Kharaj Mukherjee, Subhashree Ganguly, Saheb Chatterjee, Supriyo Dutta	Grassroot Entertainment	Drama, comedy	
S E P T E M B E R	26	Chotushkone	Srijit Mukherji (director/screenplay); Anjan Dutt, Aparna Sen, Anindya Chatterjee, Biswajit Chakraborty, Chiranjeet, Debolina Dutta, Goutam Ghose, Indrasish Roy, Kaushik Ganguly, Parambrata Chatterjee, Payel Sarkar, Rahul Banerjee	DAG Creative Media / Reliance Entertainment	Thriller	

== October–December ==
Opening		Title	Cast	Production Company	Genre	Ref.
O C T O B E R	1	Yoddha: The Warrior	Dev, Mimi Chakraborty	Raj Chakraborty	Fantasy, Action	
O C T O B E R	24	Abar Hobe To Dekha	Jeet Goswami (director/screenplay); Samrat Mukherjee, Sudipta Gon Chowdhury	RK Entertainments	Drama	
N O V E M B E R	7	Khaad	Kaushik Ganguly (director/screenplay); Kamaleshwar Mukherjee, Mimi Chakraborty, Tanusree Chakraborty, Ardhendu Banerjee, Bharat Kaul, Gargi Roychowdhury, Lily Chakravarty, Rudranil Ghosh, Saheb Bhattacharjee, Tridha Choudhury	Shree Venkatesh Films / Surinder Films	Adventure, drama	
N O V E M B E R	7	Kkoli: A Journey of Love	Partha Chakraborty (director/screenplay); Hirak Das, Ruplekha, Chandan Sen, Kharaj Mukherjee, Locket Chatterjee, Rajesh Sharma, Rita Koiral, Tulika Basu, Ashutosh Rana	Vignesh Films	Romance, drama	
N O V E M B E R	7	Force	Prosenjit Chatterjee, Arpita Pal	Raja Chanda		
N O V E M B E R	7	Pati Parameshwar	Rituparna Sengupta, Rajatava Dutta	Jayasree Bhattacharya	Comedy	
N O V E M B E R	14	Parapaar	Ahmed Rubel, Dr. Ejajul Islam	Sanjoy Nag	Drama	
N O V E M B E R	28	Sondhey Namaar Aagey	Rhitobrata Bhattacharya (director/screenplay); Rahul Bose, Rituparna Sengupta, Biswajit Chatterjee, Nusrat Jahan, June Malia, Palash Sen	Narasimha Films	Thriller, drama	
D E C E M B E R	5	Ek Phaali Rodh	Atanu Ghosh (director/screenplay); Dhritiman Chaterji, Ritwik Chakraborty, Aparajita Ghosh Das, Jisshu Sengupta, Tota Roychowdhury, Mahua Halder	Teamwork Communication	Psychological thriller, drama	
D E C E M B E R	12	Khola Hawa	Anup Das (director/screenplay); Rituparna Sengupta, Samadarshi Dutta, Joy Sengupta, Bidita Bag, Ekavali Khanna	White Mist Productions	Romance, Drama	
D E C E M B E R	19	Badshahi Angti	Sandip Ray (director/screenplay); Abir Chatterjee, Bharat Kaul, Biswajit Chakraborty, Deepankar De, Dwijen Banerjee, Paran Bandopadhyay, Rajatava Dutta, Sourav Das	Shree Venkatesh Films	Mystery, thriller	
D E C E M B E R	19	Byomkesh Phire Elo	Anjan Dutt (director/screenplay); Abir Chatterjee, Saswata Chatterjee, Ushasie Chakraborty, Anjana Basu, Biswajit Chakraborty, Chandan Sen, Ena Saha, Kaushik Sen, Locket Chatterjee, Rahul Banerjee, Sampurna Lahiri	R. P. Techvision	Mystery, thriller	
D E C E M B E R	31	Aranye maniac killer mystery	Rocky Rupkumar Patra (Director, Concept creator), Rajkumar Patra, Rocky Rupkumar Patra, Indrani Toong, Yudhisthir Patra	Patras Glam Entertainment	Suspense, Mystery	
