= Dahar =

Dahar may refer to:

- Ahmed A-Dahar (1906–1984), Israeli Arab politician
- Dhahar District, a district of the Sanaag region of Somalia
- Jebel Dahar, a mountain range of Tunisia
- Kebri Dahar, a town in eastern Ethiopia
- Kabri Dar Airport, an international airport in Kebri Dahar
- Kebri Dahar (woreda), a woreda of eastern Ethiopia
- Dahar (tribe), a tribe from Sindh, Pakistan

== See also ==
- Dahaad, an Indian TV series
- Dohar (band), a folk music band from India
