= Pati Parameshwar (film) =

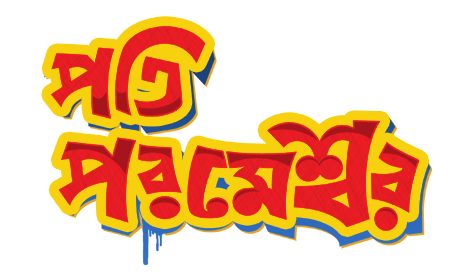
- Directed by: Jayasree Bhattacharyya
- Story by: Subhranil Biswas
- Produced by: Anjan Kumar Roy
- Starring: Rituparna Sengupta; Rajatava Dutta
- Music by: Surojit Chatterjee
- Production company: Holly Bolly Tolly Kolly Production
- Distributed by: Eskay Movies
- Release date: 7 November 2014
- Country: India
- Language: Bengali

Pati Parameshwar is a 2014 Indian Bengali comedy film directed by Jayasree Bhattacharyya based on a story written by Subhranil Biswas. This film was produced and presented by Anjan Kumar Roy. The film features Rituparna Sengupta, Rajatava Dutta, Rahul Arunodoy Banerjee, Bobby Chakraborty and Sudipta Chakraborty. Music of the film was composed by Surojit Chatterjee.

== Plot ==
The film revolves around the life of a childless couple, Arindam, a police officer and his beautiful wife, Sharmila. They have a pet dog named Pluto, who accidentally runs off on a summer afternoon. What follows afterwards in the life of this couple is what the film is all about.

== Cast ==
- Rituparna Sengupta as Sharmila Chatterjee
- Rajatava Dutta as Arindam Chatterjee
- Rahul Arunodoy Banerjee as Amol
- B.D Mukherjee as Jethu
- Supriyo Dutta as Commissioner of Police
- Bobby Chakraborty as KLo or Keshav Lodh
- Biswanath Basu as Dhuni Baba
- Kanchana Moitra as Bhairobi

== Production ==
The film was shot in a span of 24 days, by Jayashree Bhattacharyya with 103 actors, all across Kolkata and various locations in West Bengal.

== Music ==
Music direction by Surojit Chatterjee of successful films like Kaali Amaar Maa, Icche, Hello Memsaheb, Muktodhara, Handa Bhonda, Halud Pakhir Dana, Gogoler Kirti. Music of the film Pati Parameshwar was recorded at Studio Kusum Kolkata, at Studio Meet Brothers Mumbai.

1. "Dilli ka laddoo" lyrics by Surojit Chatterjee featuring Mir and Rituparna Sengupta
2. "Dyang Dyang Dyang" lyrics by Kamalinee Chatterjee featuring Akriti Kakkar and Rana Mazumdar
3. "Paisa wasool" lyrics by Surojit Chatterjee, Kamalinee Chatterjee, RED Mukherjee, featuring June Banerjee, Rana Mazumder and Surojit Chatterjee
4. "Roomal" lyrics by Surojit Chatterjee featuring Surojit Chatterjee, June Banerjee, Rajib Banerjee, Mainak Sengupta.
5. "Rabindrasangeet" Medley with Pran Chae chokkhu na chae and Amar Hridoy featuring Jayati Chakraborty and Supratik Das.

== Reception ==
Madhusree Ghosh of The Times of India gave the film a 2 out of 5 stars, NowRunning 3 stars and a half.
