= Raktabeej =

2023 Indian Bengali film

- Theatrical release poster
- Directed by: Nandita Roy; Shiboprosad Mukherjee
- Screenplay by: Zinia Sen; Sarbari Ghoshal
- Story by: Nandita Roy; Shiboprosad Mukherjee; Zinia Sen
- Based on: 2014 Burdwan Blast
- Produced by: Windows Production presented by Sanjay Agarwal
- Starring: Victor Banerjee; Abir Chatterjee; Mimi Chakraborty
- Cinematography: Pratip Mukhopadhyay
- Edited by: Malay Laha
- Music by: Songs: Dohar; Anindya Chattopadhyay; Surojit Chatterjee Score: Prabuddha Banerjee
- Production company: Windows Production
- Distributed by: Windows Production; Cinepolis
- Release date: 19 October 2023
- Running time: 142 minutes
- Country: India
- Language: Bengali
- Budget: ₹4.5 crore
- Box office: ₹6.5+ crore

Raktabeej (transl. Seeds of Blood) is a 2023 Indian Bengali-language political action thriller film co-written and directed by Nandita Roy and Shiboprosad Mukherjee. The plot is mainly inspired by the true events of 2014 Burdwan Blast that deeply shook West Bengal and India. The film stars Victor Banerjee, Abir Chatterjee and Mimi Chakraborty in the lead roles. This film is produced and distributed by Windows and presented by Sanjay Agarwal.

The film marked the return of Victor Banerjee in a lead role after a long time. The film was released on 19 October 2023 in West Bengal. It was released outside Bengal on 27 October 2023 in Hindi, Odia and Assamese.

The film spanned into a franchise, with Raktabeej 2 in 2025, which ended with a cliffhanger for Raktabeej 3.

== Cast ==
- Victor Banerjee as Animesh Chatterjee, President of India (character loosely based on Pranab Mukherjee)
- Abir Chatterjee as IG Pankaj Singha, Central Team
- Mimi Chakraborty as Sanjukta Mitra, SP of Burdwan
- Anashua Majumdar as Gouri Mukherjee, Animesh's elder sister
- Kanchan Mallick as Inspector Nityananda Patitundi
- Rajrup Chowdhury as Policemen, Immigration officer
- Ankush Hazra (Cameo appearance) in the song "Gobindo Dat Maje Na" alias Munir Alam alias Dr. Saahil Choudhury
- Tanusree Shankar as Chief Minister of West Bengal
- Satyam Bhattacharya as Nishikanta Manna
- Devlina Kumar as Jamini Halder
- Debashis Mondal as Munir Alam, a terrorist
- Uma Banerjee as Mala
- Paromita Mukherjee as Kanaklata

== Production ==
=== Announcement and development ===
The film was officially announced on 9 March 2023. The filming started soon after the announcement, on 15 March 2023. In an interview with the Deccan Herald, Mukherjee of the director duo said that they sought help from the editor of Times of India in Kolkata as soon they understood that the film demanded a budget they didn't have. They kept working on the story and continued with the research work. After nine years, they could finally make the film on a scale that deemed fit for the story.

=== Filming ===
The principal photography took place in Kolkata, Dhulagar, Bantala, Panchla and Bolpur. One important scene was filmed at Raisina Hill.

=== Marketing ===
The teaser for the film was released on 25 August 2023 on WINDOWS Youtube channel. The Hindi teaser was dropped on 28 August 2023 and the Odia teaser on 4 September 2023. The trailer was released on 30 September 2023.

== Music ==
Raktabeej

Soundtrack album by Dohar, Anindya Chattopadhyay and Surojit Chatterjee
- Genre: Feature film soundtrack
- Length: 15:29
- Language: Bengali
- Labels: WINDOWS; Times Music Bangla
- Producer: Windows Production

The music of the film has been composed by Dohar, Anindya Chattopadhyay and Surojit Chatterjee. The lyrics have been penned by Surojit Chatterjee, Anindya Chatterjee, Shyamapada Bhattacharjee and Kalikaprasad Bhattacharjee. One song uses traditional lyrics.

The first single "Gobindo Daant Maje Na" was released on 9 September 2023. The music video featured Ankush Hazra. The second single "Gouri Elo' was released 22 September 2023. The third single "Nakku Nakur Na Jao Thakur" was released on 6 October 2023. The fourth single titled "Joyo Joyo Bijoyagaman" was released on 2 November 2023.

Track listing
No.	Title	Lyrics	Music	Singer(s)	Length
1.	"Gobindo Daant Maje Na"	Surojit Chatterjee	Surojit Chatterjee	Surojit Chatterjee	3:31
2.	"Gouri Elo"	Traditional	Traditional	Dohar, Tirtha Bhattacharjee, Rohan Das(Child Artist)	2:49
3.	"Nakku Nakur Na Jao Thakur"	Anindya Chatterjee	Anindya Chatterjee	Antara Nandy, Ankita Nandy	3:54
4.	"Joyo Joyo Bijoyagaman"	Shyamapada Bhattacharjee, Kalikaprasad Bhattacharjee	Shyamapada Bhattacharjee, Kalikaprasad Bhattacharjee	Iman Chakraborty, Dohar	5:15
Total length:					15:29

== Release ==
=== Theatrical ===
The film was released on 19 October 2023 on the occasion of Durga Puja.

=== Home media ===
On 18 February 2024 this movie was telecast on Star Jalsha. On that day this movie was streamed on the OTT platform Hoichoi. Later it has been also made available for streaming on Disney+ Hotstar and Amazon Prime Video.

== Reception ==
=== Critical reception ===
Upali Mukhopadhyay of Aajkaal reviewed the film and wrote "[The] story of the film, strong screenplay, sparkling dialogues, remarkable acting and last but not the least, the mettle of the directors makes the film." Subhash K Jha of Times Now rated the film 3.5 out of 5 stars and wrote "It was a Bangla film executed on a level where both the intelligentsia and the masses can engage and have a fulfilling time. One can make it engaging and relevant without pounding in the message. Raktabeej proves it." Suchandra Ghatak of Anandabazar Patrika reviewed the film and wrote "This kind of thriller is rarely seen in Tollywood. Suspense is the last word and audience of all age will remember this film for a long time."

Poorna Banerjee of The Times of India rated the film 4 out of 5 stars and wrote "With Raktabeej, director duo Nandita Roy and Shiboprosad Mukherjee have stepped away from their comfort zone to deliver a power-packed action-adventure film. However, the film’s intent to deliver a strong message about terrorism doesn’t allow for much of a backstory for the characters and complete their arcs." Shamayita Chakraborty of OTTplay rated the film 3.5 out of 5 stars and wrote "As a film, it is entertaining. Unlike many of Shiboprosad and Nandita’s films, it has no unnecessary sentimentality. It is smart and riveting and almost recommendable."

Sandipta Bhanja of Sangbad Pratidin rated the film 4.5 out of 5 stars and wrote "The combination of State and Central is good and from there, the light fragrance of love touches the heart even in the midst of terrorist activities and bloodbaths." Sushmita Dey of Ei Samay rated the film 4 out of 5 stars and wrote "The songs of the film will really touch the heart of the audience. It is possible to make a film out of boundary in a completely different genre apart from the family film." The North East Film Journal had a positive review on the film.

Virat Verma of Flickonclick rated the film 3.7 out of 5 stars and wrote "The film takes a broader view, shedding light on the underlying issues at play, making it not just a thrilling watch but also a thought-provoking one. The directors have created a compelling narrative that not only entertains but also leaves one contemplating the broader implications, making it a noteworthy addition to the world of Bengali cinema." Souvik Saha of Cine Kolkata rated the film 4.5 out of 5 stars and wrote "Raktabeej stands out as a well-executed thriller that successfully blends political intrigue, familial complexities, and suspenseful moments."

== Sequel ==
In the end-credits scene, it was revealed that Ankush Hazra's character is also one of the many terrorists who remain disguised as Munir Alam, therefore confirming him as the main antagonist for the sequel. Shiboprasad Mukherjee hinted at the sequel in a social media post in November 2023.

The sequel, titled Raktabeej 2, was officially announced on 26 January 2025, on the occasion of India's Republic Day. The film is set to be released in October 2025, coinciding with Durga Puja 2025.
