= Queens (Indian TV series) =

2026 Indian Bengali web series

- Teaser poster
- Genre: Revenge drama
- Written by: Nirjhar Mitra; Shayak Roy; Nilanjan Chakraborty
- Screenplay by: Nirjhar Mitra; Shayak Roy; Nilanjan Chakraborty
- Directed by: Nirjhar Mitra
- Starring: Mimi Chakraborty
- Theme music composer: Mainak Mazoomdar
- Composer: Mainak Mazoomdar
- Country of origin: India
- Original language: Bengali
- No. of seasons: 1
- No. of episodes: 7

Production
- Cinematography: Prosenjit Chowdhury
- Editor: Subhajit Singha
- Camera setup: Single-camera
- Running time: 17—27 minutes
- Production company: No Country Films Production

Original release
- Release: 12 June 2026

Queens is a 2026 Indian Bengali revenge drama web series directed by Nirjhar Mitra. Written by Mitra along with Shayak Roy and Nilanjan Chakraborty, the series has been produced under the banner of No Country Films Production. The series stars Mimi Chakraborty in the lead role while Baisakhi Marjit, Joydeep Mukherjee and Arna Mukhopadhyay play other pivotal roles.

The series is about four women who, after losing their husbands in a political feud, decide to take revenge against the wrongdoers. The music of the series has been done by Mainak Mazoomdar. Prosenjit Chowdhury did the cinematography while Subhajit Singha handled the editing. The series was streamed on the Bengali OTT platform Hoichoi on 12 June 2026.

== Overview ==
The series follows Meera, who is widowed on her wedding night after her husband, father-in-law and two brothers-in-law are killed in a political rivalry. Left behind with her mother-in-law and two sisters-in-law, she decides to fight back against the men who killed their husbands. The series follows their struggle for revenge and survival against a powerful political and criminal network.

== Cast ==
- Mimi Chakraborty as Meera Sarkar
- Baisakhi Marjit as Sabitri Sarkar, Meera's mother in-law
- Payel De as Polly Sarkar, Meera's sister-in-law
- Debjani Singha as Jhuma Sarkar, Meera's sister-in-law
- Durbar Sharma as Bhola, the Sarkars' confidant
- Joydeep Mukherjee as Nilmoni Mishra, a corrupt politician and Manik Sarkar's rival
- Arna Mukhopadhyay as Shankar Mishra, Nilmoni Mishra's son
- Subrata Sengupta
- Shayak Roy
- Kaushik Chatterjee as Manik Sarkar, a politician
- Debanjan Mitra as Ujjal Sarkar, Polly's husband
- Judhajit Sarkar as Subho Sarkar, Jhuma's husband
- Rahul Dev Bose as Arjun Sarkar, Meera's husband

== Episodes ==
No.	Title	Directed by	Written by	Original release date
1	"Shaheb-er Order"	Nirjhar Mitra	Nirjhar Mitra, Shayak Roy and Nilanjan Chakraborty	June 12, 2026
2	"Haat-e Rawkter Daag"	Nirjhar Mitra	Nirjhar Mitra, Shayak Roy and Nilanjan Chakraborty	June 12, 2026
3	"Dhal-Taroyal"	Nirjhar Mitra	Nirjhar Mitra, Shayak Roy and Nilanjan Chakraborty	June 12, 2026
4	"Action Hobey"	Nirjhar Mitra	Nirjhar Mitra, Shayak Roy and Nilanjan Chakraborty	June 12, 2026
5	"Khuchiye Ghaa Koro Na"	Nirjhar Mitra	Nirjhar Mitra, Shayak Roy and Nilanjan Chakraborty	June 12, 2026
6	"Kono Meyechhele Nai"	Nirjhar Mitra	Nirjhar Mitra, Shayak Roy and Nilanjan Chakraborty	June 12, 2026
7	"Raja Bodlanor Somoy"	Nirjhar Mitra	Nirjhar Mitra, Shayak Roy and Nilanjan Chakraborty	June 12, 2026

== Production ==
Queens was announced by Hoichoi on 13 January 2026 as part of its 2026 content slate, alongside eleven other web series. The series marked the second collaboration between director Nirjhar Mitra and Mimi Chakraborty following Dainee (2025).

Filming began in February 2026. Rahul Dev Bose was cast in a brief role opposite Mimi Chakraborty, while Arna Mukhopadhyay and Joydeep Mukherjee were cast as the antagonists.

Principal photography took place in Kolkata and North Bengal. Filming commenced in Kolkata, with locations including Metiaburuz, Khidirpur, Behala, Santoshpur, Budge Budge and Akra. After completing the Kolkata schedule in February 2026, the production unit departed for North Bengal on 11 March 2026, where the remaining scenes were filmed later that month.

== Marketing ==
The teaser of Queens released on 22 May 2026. The trailer was released on 2 June 2026.

== Reception ==
=== Critical reception ===
Agnivo Niyogi of The Telegraph reviewed the film and opined, "Although Queens is a familiar tale of betrayal and vengeance, its female-led perspective and brisk storytelling injects freshness into a genre traditionally dominated by men." He appreciated the fact that the series avoids dwelling in victimhood, the quick pace throughout the seven episodes, the intense antagonistic portrayal of Joydeep Mukherjee and Arna Mukhopadhyay, the direction, the contrast displayed between the calm background and violent storytelling, the music, the cinematography, Mimi Chakraborty's seasoned performance and the performance of the three other widow character but he bemoaned the easy achievement of victory for Mimi's character, which makes her look invincible.

Torna Chakraborty of The Times of India rated the series 2.5/5 stars and wrote, "Beneath its thriller mechanics, Queens is a story of grief, survival and sisterhood, following women who are forced to rebuild their lives after sudden loss. The series is uneven, but the final act effectively ties up its main threads while clearly setting up a sequel." She praised the fact that the director has avoided displaying widowhood as victimhood and instead presented it as a fuel for revenge, the performance of the actors; particularly Arna Mukhopadhyay, the backdrop of North Bengal, the cinematography and the engaging climax. But she criticized Mimi's not-so-intense performance as per the demands of the writing, the below-par background score, the poor story execution, the unnecessarily stretched revenge arcs and the emotionless dialogues.

Siddartha Toleti of M9 News reviewed the series and noted, "Queens is a smart feminist reimagining of a typical mafia story. The premise of victimised women emerging triumphant in a male bastion is naturally uplifting, indicating their sisterhood and resilience." He applauded Mimi Chakraborty's performance, the portrayal of how poor people are used as pawns in real-world crimes, the crisp writing, the background music and the cinematography but bemoaned the fact that Meera seems to have an easy solution in every critical situation. Parama Dasgupta of Aajkal reviewed the series and praised Nirjhar Mitra's direction, Mimi's screen presence, Durbar Sharma's innocent acting, Joydeep Mukherjee and Arna Mukhopadhyay's brutal performance in their antagonistic roles. But she bemoaned the ease with which Mimi's character, Meera, overcomes the life-threatening hurdles.
