= Kkoli: A Journey of Love =

- Theatrical release poster
- Directed by: Partha Chakraborty
- Screenplay by: Partha Chakraborty
- Produced by: Rakesh Singh
- Starring: See below
- Cinematography: Barun Mukherjee
- Edited by: Sanjib Dutta
- Music by: Meet Bros Anjjan; Surojit Chatterjee
- Production company: Vignesh Films
- Release date: 7 November 2014
- Running time: 135 minutes
- Country: India
- Language: Bengali

Kkoli: A Journey of Love is a 2014 Bengali romantic-drama film directed by Partha Chakraborty and produced by Rakesh Singh under the banner of Vignesh Films. The film marks the debut of Heerak and Ruplekha, the male and female lead respectively. The film score was given by Meet Bros Anjjan and Surojit Chatterjee.

== Cast ==
- Heerak
- Ruplekha
- Kharaj Mukherjee
- Rajesh Sharma
- Chandan Sen
- Locket Chatterjee
- Tulika Basu

== Music ==
Kkoli: A Journey of Love

Soundtrack album by: Meet Bros Anjjan; Surojit Chatterjee
- Released: 8 February 2014
- Genre: Feature film soundtrack
- Length: 22:58
- Label: Times Music

Meet Bros Anjjan chronology
Double Di Trouble (2014)	Kkoli: A Journey of Love (2014)	Singham Returns (2014)

Surojit Chatterjee chronology
Holud Pakhir Dana (2014)	Kkoli – A Journey of Love (2014)	Gogoler Kirti (2014)

The soundtrack of the film has been given by Meet Bros Anjjan and Surojit Chatterjee, while the lyrics have been penned by Rana Mazumdar and Surojit Chatterjee. The album includes four original tracks, one reprise track and one remix track. This album marks the Tollywood debut of the trio, Meet Bros Anjjan.

All lyrics are written by Rana Mazumdar and Surojit Chatterjee; all music is composed by Meet Bros Anjjan and Surojit Chatterjee.

Kkoli: A Journey of Love (Original Motion Picture Soundtrack)
No.	Title	Lyrics	Music	Artist(s)	Length
1.	"Elitin Beletin"	Rana Mazumdar	Meet Bros Anjjan	Meghna Mishra, Aryan Bhattcharya	4:04
2.	"Jodi Chaao"	Rana Mazumdar	Meet Bros Anjjan	Shreya Ghoshal, Shaan	5:23
3.	"Rajkanya Re"	Surojit Chatterjee	Surojit Chatterjee	Ruplekha, Surojit Chatterjee	3:51
4.	"Tumi Acho"	Rana Mazumdar	Meet Bros Anjjan	Palak Muchhal, Anjjan Bhattacharya	4:52
5.	"Jodi Chaao (Reprise)"	Rana Mazumdar	Meet Bros Anjjan	Anjjan Bhattacharya	1:28
6.	"Tumi Acho (MBA Swag Remix)"	Rana Mazumdar	Meet Bros Anjjan	Palak Muchhal, Anjjan Bhattacharya	3:20
Total length:					22:58
