= 71st Annual BFJA Awards =

Best Indian Cinema Award of 2012

The 71st Bengal Film Journalists' Association Awards were held on September 11, 2013 after six years, at The Science City Auditorium, Kolkata honoring excellence in various categories in Indian cinema in 2012.

== Best Film ==
- Bhooter Bhabishyat - Anik Dutta
- Chitrangada: The Crowning Wish - Rituporno Ghosh
- Aparajita Tumi - Aniruddha Roy Chowdhury

== Best Director ==
- Anik Dutta - Bhooter Bhabishyat

== Best Actor ==
- Dev - Khokababu

== Best Actress ==
- Rituparna Sengupta - Muktodhara
- Koel Mallick - Hemlock Society

== Best Music ==
- Jeet Ganguly - Paglu 2

== Best Lyricist ==
- Priyo Chattopadhyay - Khokababu for the song "Soniye Tu"

== Best Male Playback Singer ==
- Anupam Roy - Hemlock Society

== Best Female Playback Singer ==
- Lopamudra Mitra - Hemlock Society

== Best Original Story ==
- Bhooter Bhabishyat - Anik Dutta

== Best Promising Director ==
- Raj Chakraborty

== Best Promising Actor ==
- Hiran Chatterjee - Macho Mustanaa

== Best Promising Actress ==
- Mimi Chakraborty - Bapi Bari Ja

== Best Cameraman ==
- Premendu Bikash Chaki - Mayabazar

== Best Editor ==
- Sandip Dutta - Mayabazar

== Best Art Director ==
- Ananda Addya - Hemlock Society

== Best Make-Up Man ==
- Md. Yonis - Bojhena Shey Bojhena

== Best Special Jury Award ==
- Swastika Mukherjee - Bhooter Bhabishyat

== Most Outstanding Work of The Year ==
- Prosenjit Chatterjee - Aparajita Tumi

== Best Book on Cinema ==
- Cinemar Kathakata - Chandi Mukherjee

== Lifetime achievement award ==
- Tarun Majumdar
- Aparna Sen

== Evergreen Actor ==
- Chiranjeet
