= Raktabeej 2 =

2025 Indian Bengali film

- Teaser poster
- Directed by: Nandita Roy; Shiboprosad Mukherjee
- Screenplay by: Zinia Sen
- Story by: Zinia Sen
- Produced by: Windows Production; Sanjay Agarwal
- Starring: Victor Banerjee; Abir Chatterjee; Mimi Chakraborty; Ankush Hazra; Koushani Mukherjee; Seema Biswas
- Cinematography: Pratip Mukherjee
- Edited by: Malay Laha
- Music by: Songs: Bonnie Chakraborty; Anupam Roy; Surojit Chatterjee; Silajit Majumder; Score: Bonnie Chakraborty
- Production company: Windows Production
- Distributed by: Windows Production
- Release date: 25 September 2025
- Running time: 151 minutes
- Country: India
- Language: Bengali
- Box office: est.₹7.25 Crore

Raktabeej 2 (transl. Seeds of Blood 2) is an Indian Bengali-language political action thriller film directed by Nandita Roy and Shiboprosad Mukherjee, and written by Zinia Sen. A sequel to the 2023 film Raktabeej, it stars Victor Banerjee, Abir Chatterjee, Mimi Chakraborty, Ankush Hazra, Seema Biswas, and Koushani Mukherjee. The film is produced and distributed by Windows and presented by Sanjay Agarwal. This notably marks the second collaboration of Abir Chatterjee and Ankush Hazra after 12 years since Kanamachi, where the latter played the lead role, and the former antagonist.

A sequel to Raktabeej, it is reportedly inspired by the security challenges during former Indian President Pranab Mukherjee's 2013 visit to Bangladesh. The plot focuses on a high-stakes investigation into cross-border terrorism led by a new terrorist leader, Munir Alam. The mission spans from India to Thailand, dealing with extremist groups attempting to disrupt and destabilise the relationship between India and Bangladesh, creating national chaos between the two neighbouring countries. The film was released on 25 September 2025, during the Durga Puja festival.

== Plot ==
In the mid-seventies, post the Bangladesh Liberation War, Sultana Rahman fled to India after some attacks on her family. She stayed with Animesh Chatterjee, the then politician of the ruling party. Later, she returned to her country and became the Prime Minister of Bangladesh, while Animesh became the President of India.

Back when Saahil Choudhury was studying MBBS in Thailand, he falls in love with Ayesha. He tops the class, but finds out that his mother was killed in a blast at a mosque. In a vulnerable condition, he is convinced to join JSM, the terrorist organization, and becomes the new face of Munir Alam. He becomes an expert in shooting sniper rifles. Meanwhile, Ayesha realises about Saahil's terrorist connections and confronts him, to which he reacts violently and they get separated ever since.

The Government of Bangladesh suspect some people who threat to overthrow their government. Meherunnisa Khan, the leader of the opposition party is meanwhile in a trip to India, who is suspected to influence the common people against the Government.

In Burdwan, post the events of Raktabeej, Gouri suspects everyone in the house, except Kanak. When her family doctor is out of station, he sends his student Ravi Shukla to take care of her, who is killed by Munir Alam (Ankush Hazra) and he becomes the imposter and infiltrates the family. Due to his caring nature, Gouri gains trust on him. Sanjukta enters a ladies hostel with her force, which is later revealed to be a den for storing arms for terrorists and illegal immigrants. However, one of the convicts are killed mysteriously just when Sanjukta raids the place.

Pankaj returns to Bengal and once again joins hands with Sanjukta. They find out that JSM has activated their sleeper cell all over the SAARC countries. As Animesh plans a visit to her in-laws' house in Bangladesh, he takes Gouri along with her. Munir convinces Gouri to join her wherever she goes in Bangladesh. One convict from the illegal immigrants case opens his mouth about mission M2, planned by the JSM and confirms that Munir is still alive.

During a mission, Riya, a team member of Pankaj is mysteriously convinced to call Pankaj while she was travelling in police convoys, through which Munir confirms her presence in the exact convoy and shoots her with a sniper rifle from a far distance. Pankaj suspects foul play and immediately requests his superiors for a trip to Bangladesh, as the President's trip to Bangladesh was nearing.

The JSM gets a tip of this information and plants Kalim, him being a namesake of Pankaj as a spy, whom Pankaj and Sanjukta mistakes to be planted by the Bangladesh Police, who were not co-operating with them from the very beginning and had confiscated their arms and mobile phones. Later when they catch the spy, before he reveals anything, he is again shot by someone mysteriously from a distance. The Bangladesh Police catch Pankaj, Sanjukta and their team with the dead man, and arrest them.

Meanwhile, Munir kills a mechanic and infiltrates the Under 19 Cricket Tournament Opening Ceremony to be held in Bangladesh. Pankaj, Sanjukta and their team get bailed, but are not permitted to take any action. However, on the day of the opening ceremony, Sultana and Meherunnisa are supposed to appear on stage together for the first time and unveil the World Cup trophy while Animesh is supposed to visit Chittagong, at Masterda Surya Sen's home to deliver a speech. Gouri, though willing to go with Animesh, changes her mind and visits the World Cup Tournament between India and Bangladesh on Munir's (Ravi) request.

Pankaj realises that 'M2' refers to 'Minus 2' and that both Sultana and Meherunnisa are going to be targeted by Munir during the ceremony and they rush to the stadium. Before the ceremony, Ayesha, now a dancer, performs live on stage and anchors the ceremony. Bangladesh Police finally cooperates with Pankaj and Sanjukta. As the ceremony is about to happen, Munir shoots a bullet towards Sultana from a floodlight tower using his signature sniper rifle. Another mysterious bullet is fired at Meherunnisa, but both of them are saved as Pankaj intervenes and instead, the bullets slightly touch him and pass. After the entire stadium is evacuated, a thrilling showdown ensues between Pankaj and Munir, where Pankaj tries to convince Munir to quit terrorism but he jumps from the high floodlight tower and commits suicide. Ayesha, receiving this news and knowing Munir's true identity, reaches to the crime spot and gives her identity as his wife to the police, only to go visit Saahil's dead body. In a visual storytelling method, we see Munir's blood drops falling on the stairs of the gallery, which will eventually form another Munir.

In the pre-credits scene, as Pankaj and Sanjukta finally establish a rapport between each other, Sanjukta casually kicks a vacant Coke can, which eventually blasts. As Pankaj falls apart against the car, it is revealed that the mysterious man killing the convict at the ladies hostel, misleading Riya as the driver of the convoy to call Pankaj to track her phone, killing Kalim on spot to frame the Indian officers, shooting the second bullet at Meherunnisa as a media cameraperson with the signature sniper and finally making the blast happen is none other than the new Munir, who continues to live on with the goal of Jihad. Apparently the protagonists fail to end the chain of terrorism and are still left to hunt down Munir, hinting at a possible sequel.

== Cast ==
- Victor Banerjee as Animesh Chatterjee, President of India (character loosely based on Pranab Mukherjee)
  - Sean Banerjee as young Animesh Chatterjee
- Abir Chatterjee as IG Pankaj Singha, Central Force from New Delhi
- Mimi Chakraborty as Sanjukta Mitra, SP of West Bengal
- Ankush Hazra as Dr. Saahil Choudhury, fake Dr. Ravi Shukla aka Munir Alam, the main antagonist
- Koushani Mukherjee as Ayesha Khan Choudhury
- Seema Biswas as the Prime Minister of Bangladesh Sultana Rahman (character loosely based on former Prime Minister of Bangladesh Sheikh Hasina)
- Anashua Majumdar as Gouri Mukherjee, Animesh's elder sister
- Kanchan Mallick as Inspector Nityananda Patitundi
- Satyam Bhattacharya as Nishikanta Manna
- Subrata Dutta as ASP Mamun Shah, Bangladesh police
- Suprabhat Das as Kalim Taqt, fake Pankaj Sinha
- Sanjib Sarkar as Shariful Islam, Bangladesh police officer
- Devlina Kumar as Jamini Halder
- Paromita Mukherjee as Kanaklata
- Swagata Mukherjee as Opposition leader of Bangladesh Meherunnisa Khan (character loosely based on Khaleda Zia)
- Ananya Banerjee as Riya
- Rajib Bose as Nakul
- Debopriyo Mukherjee as Rubel
- Sreemoyee Chattoraj Mallick in a cameo role
- Sean Banerjee as young Animesh Chatterjee
- Chandni Saha in her big-screen debut

=== Special appearance ===
- Nusrat Jahan as Nayana
- Manasi Sinha in the song "O Babur Maa"
- Shiboprosad Mukherjee as the new Munir Alam

== Production ==
=== Development ===
Windows Production officially announced Raktabeej 2 on Republic Day (26 January 2025) with a motion poster release. Directors Nandita Roy and Shiboprosad Mukherjee described the project as a "political action thriller" with higher stakes and more intense cross-border themes than its predecessor.

Despite facing competition from three other major Bengali films during the Durga Puja release period - Devi Chowdhurani, Raghu Dakat, and Joto Kando Kolkatatei - directors Nandita Roy and Shiboprosad Mukherjee expressed confidence in their project, citing their "lucky charm" or "lucky mascot" - veteran actress Anashua Majumdar, who has previously worked with Windows Production in films like Mukhoshdar Bou, Gotro, and the first Raktabeej.

=== Casting ===
Seema Biswas reunited with Shiboprosad Mukherjee after 32 years, since their work in the 1993 film Uttoran. In Raktabeej 2 she appears in a markedly different avatar — draped in a jam-coloured Dhakai saree with a ghomta — and is described by the filmmakers as being presented in the mould of a political personality; many of her scenes are opposite Victor Banerjee. Press reports also highlighted the actress's dedication on set despite physical discomfort during portions of the shoot.

Ankush Hazra was cast as the lead antagonist, marking a significant negative role for the actor. He featured in the song "Govinda Dant Maje Na" in Raktabeej, the prequel of this film, and also appeared in the credit scene.

=== Filming ===
Principal photography began in Kolkata on 11 March 2025.

An advance unit — including directors Nandita Roy and Shiboprosad Mukherjee, writer Zinia Sen and other production personnel — flew to Thailand ahead of the main cast to scout locations and prepare the sets. The rest of the unit travelled in phases: several members reached Thailand on a Saturday night while others departed Kolkata in subsequent days. Reports note that Ankush Hazra left Kolkata on the Sunday night of Jamaiṣṭhī and Koushani Mukherjee (who had been in Bali) returned to Kolkata before flying to Thailand. Shooting for the Thailand schedule was reported to commence on 3 June, focusing on compact, intensive song and action sequences.

The Thailand schedule captured two song sequences: a romantic number reuniting Abir Chatterjee and Mimi Chakraborty (a pairing from the prequel) and a second song featuring Ankush Hazra and Koushani Mukherjee intended to advance the narrative. The production worked with a compact technical unit supplemented by roughly 25 local Thai crew members for location management and logistics; press reports highlighted the warm local hospitality and attentive on-set care. Mimi Chakraborty's Thailand schedule included a filmed bikini sequence — reported as her first such sequence — which received media attention. Actor Mimi Chakraborty has also become the first Bengali actress to wear a bikini in a Bengali film.

The actress revealed in an interview with Anandabazar that she had to undergo intense physical preparation, including significant weight loss through exercise without supplements, before agreeing to director Shiboprosad Mukherjee's request to wear a bikini. She added that convincing her mother about the sequence was initially difficult, but she explained it as an important step to offer something new to audiences. Mimi noted that having Abir Chatterjee as her co-actor made filming easier. Music composer Anupam Roy also remarked that such bold romantic sequences are rare in Bengali cinema and credited the directors Nandita Roy and Shiboprosad Mukherjee for taking the risk.

Screenwriter Zinia Sen recounted moments of tension and play on set: she said Mimi once jokingly threatened co-director Shiboprosad Mukherjee by saying, "If I get a real gun I will shoot Shibu first," an anecdote the director took in good humour. The shoot saw at least one stunt-related mishap: during an early sequence a harness did not function as expected while Mimi performed a jump, causing her to fall and injure her knee; she was briefly in pain and emotional but returned to complete the shot after recovering.

During the Kolkata and Thailand schedules, actor Kanchan Mallick fell ill and was briefly hospitalised but later recovered and rejoined the production.

Nusrat Jahan described "Order Chhara Border" song as "full of life, rhythm, and colour" and mentioned that performing it on screen was "truly exhilarating." She also revealed that despite having no time to rehearse due to other promotional commitments, she managed to prepare with just one hour of rehearsal before the shoot, relying on her ability to multitask and the infectious vibe of the production.

== Music ==
Raktabeej 2

Soundtrack album by Bonnie Chakraborty, Anupam Roy, Surojit Chatterjee, Silajit Majumder
- Released: 2025
- Recorded: 2025
- Genre: Feature film soundtrack
- Language: Bengali
- Labels: WINDOWS; Times Music Bangla
- Producer: Windows Production

The music features compositions by Bonnie Chakraborty, Anupam Roy, Surojit Chatterjee, and Silajit Majumder. Background score is made by Bonnie Chakraborty, his third collaboration with Shiboprasad and Nandita since Dabaru and Bohurupi. Lyrics were penned by Surojit Chatterjee, Zinia Sen, Bonnie Chakravorty, Anindya Bose and Anupam Roy.

The first single "O Babur Maa" was released on 6 August 2025, featuring Manasi Sinha. The second single "Order Chhara Border" was released on 22 August 2025. The music video featured Nusrat Jahan in a special appearance.

The third single "Deewana Banaisen" was released on 3 September 2025. The fourth song "Chokher Neele" was released on 10 September 2025. It marked the playback debut of Suchandrika Goldar.

Track listing
No.	Title	Lyrics	Music	Singer(s)	Length
1.	"O Babur Maa"	Surojit Chatterjee	Surojit Chatterjee	Surojit Chatterjee, Iman Chakraborty	3:36
2.	"Order Chhara Border"	Silajit Majumder, Zinia Sen	Silajit Majumder	Shrestha Das	4:49
3.	"Deewana Banaisen"	Bonnie Chakraborty, Anindya Bose	Bonnie Chakraborty	Bonnie Chakraborty, Rapurna Bhattacharya, Usri Banerjee	3:32
4.	"Chokher Neele"	Anupam Roy	Anupam Roy	Suchandrika Golder	3:37
5.	"O Bondhu Shonen Na"	Anindya Bose	Bonnie Chakraborty	Shrestha Das , Bonnie Chakraborty	3:01
6.	"Dhono Dhannyo"	Dwijendralal Ray	Dwijendralal Ray	Iman Chakraborty, Usri Banerjee, Bonnie Chakraborty	3:47

== Marketing ==
The official teaser was released on 23 July 2025 at a launch event held at The Park Hotel in Kolkata. The 1-minute-49-second teaser introduced Ankush Hazra as the new villain and provided glimpses of the cross-border thriller narrative.

An innovative marketing campaign featured Nusrat Jahan participating in a flash mob performance in Kolkata's New Market area, promoting the "Order Chhara Border" song. This marked Jahan's first flash mob experience, about which she stated: "I had never performed in a flash mob before. Although I was rather anxious and unsure of how it would go, the entire experience was a lot of fun. For me, everything was entirely new, and it was thrilling to watch the crowd go wild, embracing the music and the atmosphere."

Raktabeej 2 was trending on IMDb's list of most-anticipated Indian films, ranking at the top of the list and outpacing several high-profile Hindi and South Indian projects followed by Raghu Dakat. Sangbad Pratidin framed the film's online popularity as a notable response from Tollywood to the dominance of big-budget Hindi and South Indian releases and credited the teaser and song clips for generating significant pre-release buzz.

== Release ==
=== Theatrical ===
Raktabeej 2 was theatrically released on 25 September 2025 during the Durga Puja festival. The film was distributed by Windows Production and Cinepolis. The release placed it in direct competition with other major Bengali Puja releases including Raghu Dakat, Devi Chowdhurani, and Joto Kando Kolkatatei, creating what industry observers had described as an "epic Pujo box office clash."

== Reception ==
Poorna Banerjee of The Times of India praised the film's sharp and purposeful storytelling, noting that it "plunges straight into a gripping narrative" and commended the focused script for maintaining momentum while weaving in essential backstories. She highlighted the strong performances of the lead actors, writing that Abir Chatterjee "delivers a nuanced performance, balancing gravitas and restraint." At the same time, Mimi Chakraborty "holds her own with a commanding screen presence." Sen singled out Ankush Hazra as the standout, calling his portrayal of antagonist Munir Alam "arguably one of his best performances to date." The review also appreciated the film's pacing, cinematography, and emotional sensitivity, while pointing out flaws such as occasional lapses in logic and an underwhelming soundtrack that "lacks the urgency and resonance needed." Nevertheless, Banerjee concluded that the film "balances action, emotion, and socio-political commentary with admirable finesse," leaving the door open for a potential sequel.

Agnivo Niyogi of The Telegraph reviewed the film and wrote "Shiboprosad and Nandita squander away the opportunity of a taut, and engaging crime thriller, and settle for a lite version of the myriad anti-terror web series we are by now accustomed to bingeing on OTT." He praised Abir's performance but bemoaned the fatigue on his face in some scenes, termed Mimi as "Lady Singham" but bemoaned her being reduced to a heroine craving for her man and applauded Ankush's strong performance. He also criticised the climax, immature take on geopolitics, unnecessary romantic subplots, distracting songs, unwanted melodrama and not-so-shocking twists.

Debarghya Bhattacharya of Ei Samay offered a thoughtful take on Raktabeej 2, describing it as “a technically accomplished and visually impressive continuation that ambitiously expands the universe of the first film.” Chattopadhyay praised the film's scale, meticulous production design, and its bold attempt to weave real events with fictional storytelling, noting that it “presents a broader canvas and a more layered narrative.” The review also highlighted strong performances by Abir Chatterjee and Mimi Chakraborty, whose portrayals lend depth and gravitas to the story. While the film experiments with multiple narrative threads and perspectives, Chattopadhyay observed that this approach “gives the film a sense of scope and ambition rarely seen in mainstream thrillers."

Rupak Mishra of The Wall reviewed Raktabeej 2 as a rare Bengali thriller that stays proudly original — free from southern or Hollywood imitation. Directed by Nandita Roy and Shiboprosad Mukherjee, the sequel expands the scale of the first film while keeping its emotional and cultural authenticity intact.Mishra praises Abir Chatterjee's commanding turn as IG Pankaj Sinha and Mimi Chakraborty's spirited Sanjukta, alongside strong supporting acts from Ankush Hazra, Kanchan Mallick, and others. Blending political intrigue with human emotion, the film delivers edge-of-the-seat tension without losing its Bengali essence.He concludes that Raktabeej 2 succeeds through its sincerity, storytelling craft, and unmistakable sense of identity — “a truly homegrown thriller with heart and substance.”

Souvik Saha of Cine Kolkata rated the film 2/5 stars and highlighted "Raktabeej 2 is a below-average sequel dragged down by poor screenplay, weak drama, unimpressive action, and unnecessary characters. Apart from the climax and Ankush’s performance, the film fails to leave a mark." He praised the climax drama but criticised the weak writing, screenplay, forgettable songs, below par action sequences, unnecessary romance between Abir and Mimi and irritating comedy.

Sandipta Bhanja of Sangbad Pratidin reviewed the film and termed it as a "Paisa-vasool total entertainer." She praised the performance of the entire cast; particularly Abir, Ankush and Mimi, and mentioned that Ankush's cold villain performance will leave a mark in the audience's mind. She applauded the twist at the end of the story, the cinematography by Pratip Mukherjee, Zinia Sen's story and screenplay but mentioned that the execution could have been better. She praised the song "Chokher Neele" but criticised the song "Order Chara Border". Although she bemoaned the weak chemistry between Animesh's character and his elder sister, and the over use of comedy in serious situations, she mentioned that Shiboprosad and Nandita's thrilling direction and the end twist covers up for all the shortcomings.

Shatakshi Ganguly of IWMBuzz rated the film 3/5 stars and highlighted "Raktabeej 2 delivers a decent payoff after a shaky build-up. The film struggles to find its emotive core. There’s a evident attempt to build tension and high-stakes drama, but the storytelling rarely settles prolonged enough to let anything land with real impact." She acclaimed Ankush Hazra as the strength of the film and mentioned "He brings a tightly controlled intensity to the role that anchors the climax. The showdown between him and Abir injects real energy into the final act. It’s this face-off that gives the film its edge and justifies the sequel’s existence." She praised the cinematography and production design. Addressing the flaws, she criticised the undue subplots in the first half, unnecessary romance between Abir and Mimi which adds nothing to the film except slowing it down, the unpromising action sequences, Kanchan Mallick's failed comedy, the weak writing and below par music.

== Controversy ==
After the film's release, a controversy emerged when traditional pat (scroll) artist Siraj Chitrakar alleged that his Durga–Chandimangal scroll painting, featured in the song “Gouri Elo,” was used without proper credit or payment. He claimed he was promised ₹1,00,000, later told he would receive ₹80,000, but was ultimately paid ₹28,000, and that he received no separate remuneration for appearing in the song sequence. However, it was later revealed that the issue had been misrepresented by an external media outlet, The Wall, which acknowledged publishing inaccurate information. Windows Production clarified that the allegations were baseless and confirmed that the misunderstanding had been resolved following the clarification.
