= Arundhati (2014 film) =

- Arundhati Movie Poster
- Directed by: Sujit Mondal
- Screenplay by: N. K. Salil
- Produced by: Shrikant Mohta; Nispal Singh
- Starring: Koel; Indraneil Sengupta
- Cinematography: Kumud Verma
- Edited by: Raviranjan Maitra
- Music by: Jeet Gannguli; Koti
- Production companies: Shree Venkatesh Films; Surinder Films
- Distributed by: Shree Venkatesh Films; Surinder Films
- Release date: 30 May 2014
- Running time: 137 minutes
- Country: India
- Language: Bengali

Arundhati is a 2014 Indian Bengali-language supernatural horror fantasy action film directed by Sujit Mondal and produced by Shree Venkatesh Films and Surinder Films. The film stars Koel as a warrior queen. It is the remake of the 2009 Telugu movie of the same name. It received mostly negative reviews and failed at the box office.

== Development ==
The film was jointly produced by Rajib Tandoon, under the banner of their production houses. It is the remake of the 2009 Telugu film Arundhati, starring actors Anushka Shetty and Sonu Sood. The film was around a budget of 6-7 crores INR.

== Cast ==
- Koel in a double role as
  - Rani Arundhati a.k.a. Moni Maa
  - Arundhati a.k.a. Mishti
- Indraneil Sengupta as Rudra a.k.a. Kal Rudra
- Aishi Bhattacharya as young Rani Arundhati
- Priyanka Rati Pal as Iraboti, Arundhati's elder sister and wife of Rudra
- Debshankar Haldar as Fakir Baba
- Soma Banerjee as Annada Maa, Chief Maid and friend of Moni Maa and the eldest member of Dhulibari
- Sujoy as Siddhartha a.k.a. Sid, Mishti's fiance
- Chandicharan as Mishti's grandfather and Arundhati's son
- Swarnava Sanyal as young Arundhati's son
- Debesh Roy Chowdhury as Aghori Tantrik
- Bharat Kaul as Raja Krishna Kishore Bhatta, father of Iraboti and Arundhati
- Kaushik Chakraborty as Agnidev Bhatta
- Chandraneev Mukherjee as Shomu
- Mousumi Saha as Mishti's mother
- Dulal Lahiri as priest
- Basudeb Mukherjee as Gurudeb
- Swagata Mukherjee as Maya (Rudra's mother)
- Moyna Mukherjee

== Production ==
=== Casting ===
Koel will be seen as a warrior queen for the first time in this film. Regarding her role, she said, "Till the time you don’t experiment or take risks, you don’t know to what level you can go. Playing these larger-than-life characters isn't easy, specially because I have never done it. I needed to first believe in the subject. I believe in reincarnation and life after death. After saying yes, I had to really work very hard on getting Arundhati's body language right."

=== Filming ===
Filming of Arundhati started on 24 October 2013. Mallick was reported to have a very busy schedule during the filming of Arundhati. She had to learn horse-riding and sword-fighting for portraying her character in this film. Her horse-riding classes were taken by expert Vikram Rathore, at the Kolkata Maidan during the early hours of the day. Shooting locations included Bolpur and Kolkata. Her sword-fighting sequences are based on the martial art Kalaripayattu.

== Soundtrack ==
Arundhati

Soundtrack album by Jeet Gannguli
- Released: 30 May 2014
- Recorded: 2014
- Genre: Feature film soundtrack
- Language: Bengali
- Label: Surinder Films
- Producers: Shree Venkatesh Films and Surinder Films

Jeet Gannguli chronology
Chirodini Tumi Je Amar 2 (2014)	Arundhati (2014)	Game (2014)

Singles from Arundhati
- 1. "He Naropishach" Released: 2 Dec 2018; 2. "Barondala Saaja" Released: 2 Dec 2018; 3. "Joy Joy Maa" Released: 3 Dec 2018

Jeet Gannguli and Koti composed the music for Arundhati.

Track	Song	Singer(s)	Duration (min:sec)	Music	Lyricist
1	"He Naropishach"	Monali Thakur	3:46	Jeet Gannguli and Koti	Chandrani Gannguli
2	"Borondala Saaja"	Madhuraa Bhattacharya and Chorus	4:09	Jeet Gannguli	Chandrani Gannguli
3	"Joy Joy Ma"	Kailash Kher	4:29	Jeet Gannguli and Koti	Chandrani Gannguli

== Awards ==
- Star Jalsha Award for Best Actress for Arundhati (2014 film) in 2014
