= Shastry Viruddh Shastry =

2023 Indian family drama film

- Theatrical release poster
- Directed by: Nandita Roy; Shiboprosad Mukherjee
- Written by: Anu Singh Choudhary; Shiboprosad Mukherjee; Nandita Roy
- Produced by: Ajit Andhare; Alok Tripathi; Kevin Vaz
- Starring: Paresh Rawal; Neena Kulkarni; Shiv Panditt; Mimi Chakraborty; Manoj Joshi; Tiku Talsania
- Cinematography: Sanu Varghese
- Edited by: Malay Laha
- Production companies: Viacom18 Studios; Windows Production
- Release date: 3 November 2023 (india)
- Running time: 140 minutes
- Country: India
- Language: Hindi

Shastry Viruddh Shastry is a 2023 Indian Hindi-language family drama film written by Anu Singh Choudhary, Shiboprosad Mukherjee, and Nandita Roy, and directed by Nandita Roy and Shiboprosad Mukherjee in their Hindi film debut.The films stars Paresh Rawal, Neena Kulkarni, Shiv Panditt, Mimi Chakraborty (in her Hindi debut) and Kabir Pahwa in the lead roles.

This film is a remake of the director-duo's own 2017 Bengali film Posto.

== Plot ==
7-year-old Yaman Shastry who binds the family together lives in his grandparent care and his parents visit him on weekends. Things get twisted when Yaman's father gets a chance to settle in the US but Guruji is unwilling to let Yaman go.

== Cast ==
- Paresh Rawal as Manohar Shastry a.k.a. Guruji
- Neena Kulkarni as Urmila Shastry
- Shiv Panditt as Malhaar Shastry
- Mimi Chakraborty as Mallika Shastry
- Kabir Pahwa as Yaman Shastry a.k.a. Momoji
- Manoj Joshi as Jitesh Mehta
- Tiku Talsania as Sunil Doshi
- Amruta Subhash as Shalini Patwardhan
- K.K. Raina as Judge
- Addinath Kothare as Jayesh dave
- Amruta Sant as Shilpi
- Nand Kumar as Wilson
- Sayee Mone Patil as a Teacher at Momoji's school
- Ritooja Shinde as Aditi, Jayesh's wife
- Archana Deshmukh as Principal

== Release ==
Shastry Viruddh Shastry was theatrically released on 3 November 2023.

== Reception ==
Deepa Gahlot of Scroll.in said "Hindi cinema has either demonised or deified the patriarch. Shastry Viruddh Shastry perhaps says that the era of the distant, inflexible father is drawing to an end, but until a workable model for the perfect dad – and the lax Malhar is not it – is created, kids will be tossed around and mothers will have to put up with it."

Abhishek Srivastava of The Times of India rated this film 3 stars out of 5 stars and said "This emotionally charged film takes the viewer on a relatable journey, particularly for urban couples who can identify with the events portrayed."

Pratikshya Mishra of The Quint rated this film 2.5 stars out of 5 stars and said "In a battle between one generation that believes in ‘Parampara Pratishtha Anushasan’ and another that is trying to make a living in a cutthroat world that could lead to neglect, perhaps there can be no long-term solutions."

Sumit Rajguru of Times Now rated this film 2.5 stars out of 5 stars and said "Overall, Shastry Viruddh Shastry is a movie that is high on performances but low on emotions. The main cast did a fine job, but the slow pace and predictable storyline make the film average."
