= Kalika Prasad Bhattacharya =

Indian folk singer (1970–2017)

Kalika Prasad Bhattacharya কালিকা প্রাসাদ ভট্টাচার্য
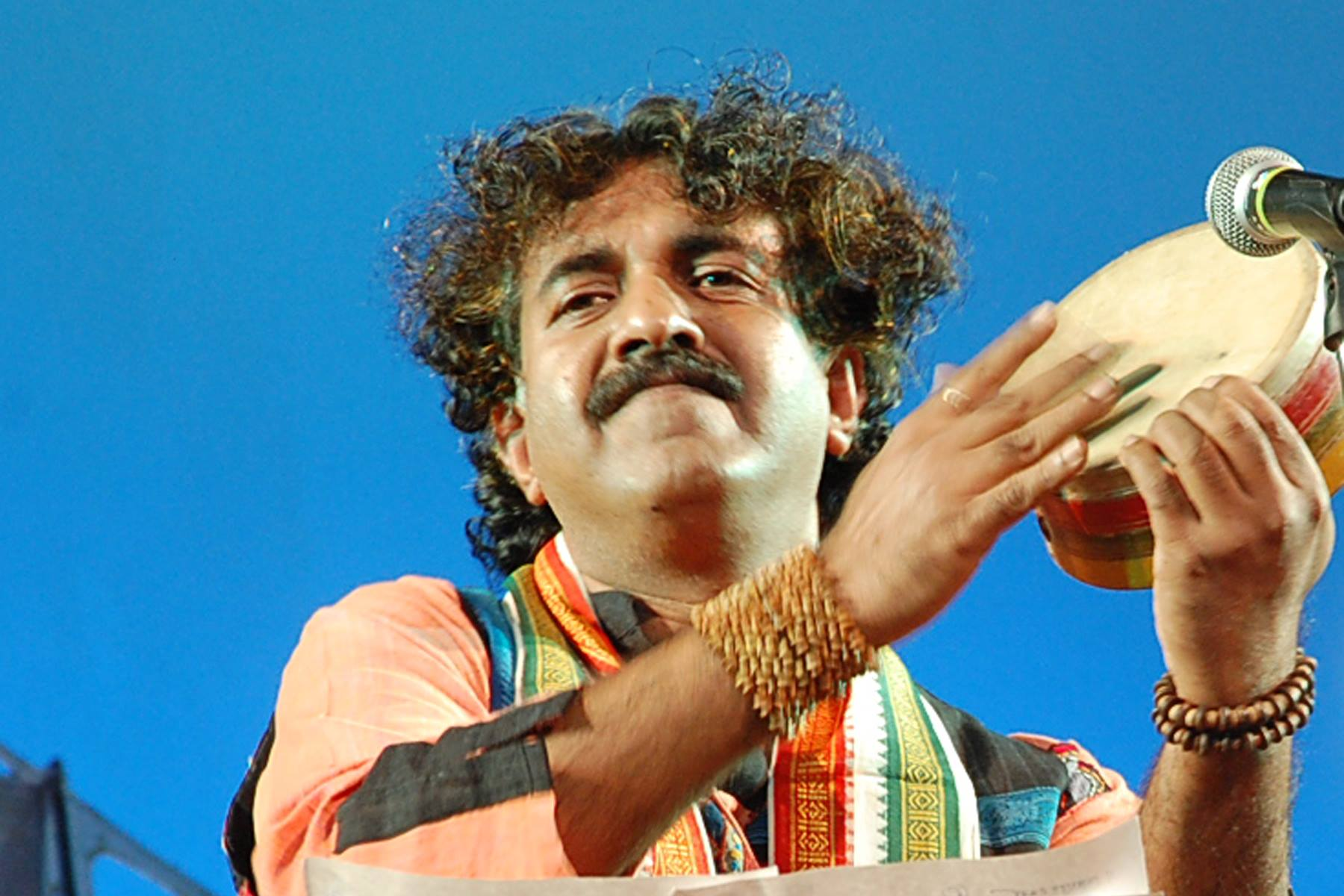
- Bhattacharya in 2016

Background information
- Born: 11 September 1970; Silchar, Assam, India
- Died: 7 March 2017 (aged 47) Gurap, Hooghly district, West Bengal, India
- Genre: Folk
- Occupation: Singer
- Website: doharfolk.com

Kalika Prasad Bhattacharya (11 September 1970 – 7 March 2017) was an Indian folk singer and researcher. He was born and raised in Silchar, Assam. He went on to study comparative literature at Jadavpur University. His musical inspiration was his uncle Ananta Bhattacharya. In 1999, he co-founded the band Dohar with the intent to revive the folk music tradition of Northern and Eastern Bengal. He also contributed music to a number of movies. His last movie was Bhuban Majhi (2017). He was associated with the popular Zee Bangla Sa Re Ga Ma Pa, a renowned Bengali music reality show. His last concert was in the Baguihati Krishi Mela.

== Life and career ==
=== Early life ===
Music was an intrinsic part of Bhattacharya's home at Silchar, Assam. His fascination with the tabla gradually propelled him towards various ethnic percussion. While learning to play this, he also trained in vocal music. His keen interest in music eventually inclined him towards the folk music of Bengal and northeastern India. In 1995, he enrolled at Jadavpur University in the Comparative Literature department. In 1998, he got a research grant from India foundation for the arts for Industrial folk music and went to Bangalore.

=== Dohar ===
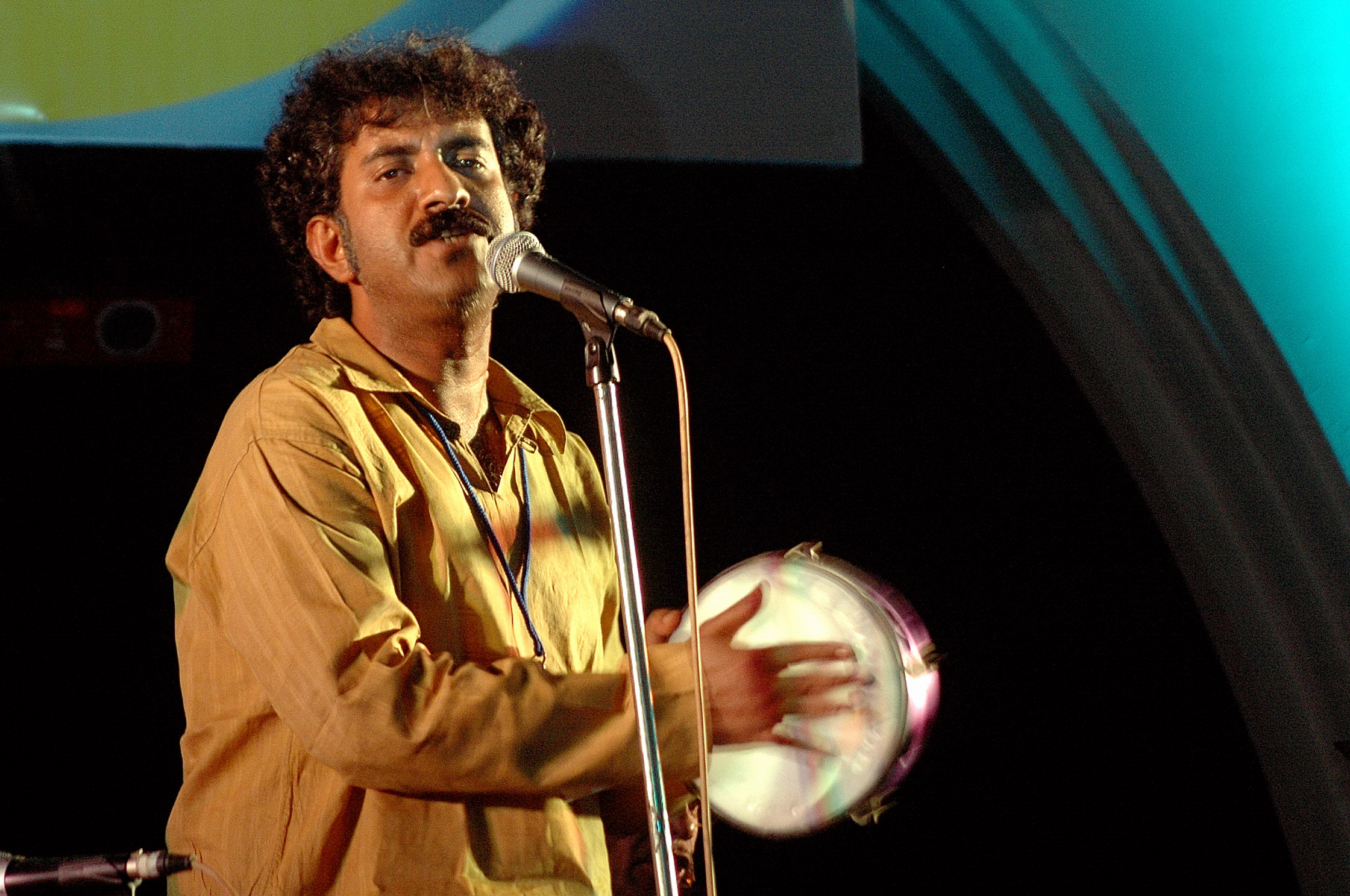
Bhattacharya in one of his folk concerts

Bhattacharya formed Dohar, a group of folk musicians, in 1999 to make the unnoticed folk songs flow for time immemorial and reach innumerable people under his creative direction. Dohar's presentation is uniquely original. Their performances amazingly merge the urban feelings with their commitment to the roots; research and entertainment, being inseparably entwined. Dohar has already released nine albums of folk songs directed by Kalika from Concord Records, Sony Music India and Saregama. Dohar's fourth album – "Bangla" is a collection of Rabindra Sangeet and folk songs. The concept of the album is a dialogue between Rabindra Sangeet and folk music based on its thematic reading. Dohar was empaneled by Indian Council for cultural relations (ICCR).

=== Musical career ===
Bhattacharya sang few playback songs in Hindi and Bengali movies. His songs in Hindi film include Gumshuda, directed by Ashoke Viswanathan. In the year 2007, he sang for the Bengali film Chaturanga directed by Suman Mukhopadhyay. In the year 2008, he sang for the Bengali film Moner Manush (golden peacock award winner) which is an India-Bangladesh joint project directed by Goutam Ghose. It is a feature film based on the novel by Sunil Gangopadhyay on Fakir Lalan Shah's life and philosophy. Bengali film Jaatishwar was a national award (Rajat Kamal) winner directed by Srijit Mukherjee, where Bhattacharya sang in the year 2014. In 2012, Bhattacharya wrote various research oriented articles which were published in various national and international journals and newspapers. He also did music for eminent theater groups like Nandikar, Kalyani Natya Charcha and Tritiyo Sutro.

Besides, Bhattacharya was the pivotal personality at a seminar on Dr. Hazarika during that program in Dhaka. Apart from playback in many popular Bengali and Hindi movies, he has given music direction in the films like "Selfie" directed by Sovan Tarafdar, "Bhuban Majhi" directed by Fakhrul Arefin (Bangladesh), "Bishorjan" directed by Koushik Ganguli, "Rosogolla" directed by Pavel and "Sitara" directed by Ashish Roy.

=== Devotion to Folk music ===
Bhattacharya was fully devoted towards the songs of soul and heart of rural Bengal. This is reiterated from his most recent occupation as one of the founder-organizers of "Sahaj Parav"- an annual root music festival, one of its kind in India, looking to celebrate the diversity and variety of folk forms of arts and crafts in greater south Asia, with a deliberate focus on Bengal. Kalika also can safely be attributed as a Tagorian scholar. His "Ajab Kudrati‟, is also an unparalleled dramatic presentation relating an aspect of Lalan Fakir with Tagore.

The TV channel Zee Bangla established that Bhattacharya's genius should not only be limited to the Bengalis but should be expanded also to the people cutting across the language barrier just like Punjabi folk songs. He promoted Bengali folk music in the program Sa Re Ga Ma Pa, and got worldwide acclamation. Following the death of Bhupen Hazarika, Bangladesh government organized a memorable program as a token of tribute to the maestro where Bhattacharya led Dohar dishing out unforgettable numbers of Dr. Hazarika.

== Awards ==
Bhattacharya received the "Sangeet Samman award” from the government of West Bengal for his unique creation and musical excellence in 2013. He received Cultural Ambassador of North East Award From Bytikram Group, Guwahati in 2013.

== Death ==
Bhattacharya died in a road accident near Gurap village in Hooghly district on 7 March 2017, aged 46.
