= Surojit Chatterjee =

Bengali musician and singer-songwriter (born 1968)

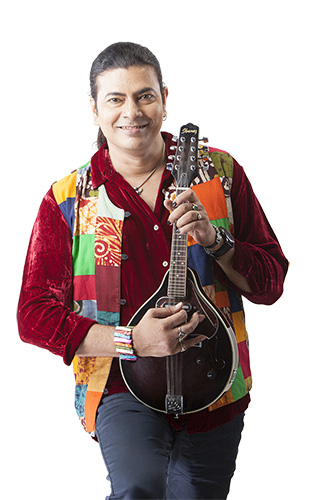
- Surojit Chatterjee
- Born: 7 May 1968 (age 58); Birbhum, West Bengal, India
- Occupations: Singer, music director, musician, songwriter
- Years active: 1990–present
- Organization(s): Bhoomi and Surojit O Bondhura, Kobita Club
- Height: 194 cm (6 ft 4 in)
- Awards: Radio Mirchi Music Awards 2012 (Best Male Vocalist); Best Album of the year 2013 (Folkira)
- Website: surojitchatterjee.com

Surojit Chatterjee (Bengali: সুরজিৎ চট্টোপাধ্যায়, the spelling reads Surajit Caţţōpādhyāy.) is an Indian Bengali singer-songwriter, music director, lyricist and the former lead singer of Bengali band Bhoomi and owner of his band Surojit O Bondhura. He has won the Radio Mirchi Music Award as the Best Male vocalist of the Year 2012 and 2013 for his album titled Folkira (Times Music). He has also directed music for the following Bengali movies such as Ichhe, Muktodhara, Handa and Bhonda. Along with composing and singing the iconic track “Bhromor Koiyo Giya” for the film Praktan, he also made a cameo appearance in the movie, portraying himself, Surojit Chatterjee..

== Early life ==
Surojit Chatterjee was born in Rampurhat, started his schooling in Birbhum and after that he was admitted to Julien Day High School, Kolkata. He started playing the tabla at the age of seven and graduated from Allahabad University with a distinction for consecutive eight years. He has learnt to play guitar from Tuhin Chatterjee and after that went on to further his guitar expertise and took guidance and learnt techniques from guitarist Amyt Datta. His first band was Grassroot which he formed during his college days and that went on to win many awards in inter-college competitions.

== Bhoomi ==
Surojit Chatterjee formed the Bengali band Bhoomi along with his co–partner Soumitra Ray in the year 1999 which performed its first concert on 24 July 1999 at the Gyan Manch Auditorium, Kolkata. Bhoomi has managed to reach both rural and urban homes in Bengal, with the simplicity of their lyrics and rhythmic music. It has released 12 popular albums for the past 12 years. He formally quit the band and started his musical journey officially in 2012 with his new band Surojit O Bondhura.

== Surojit O Bondhura ==
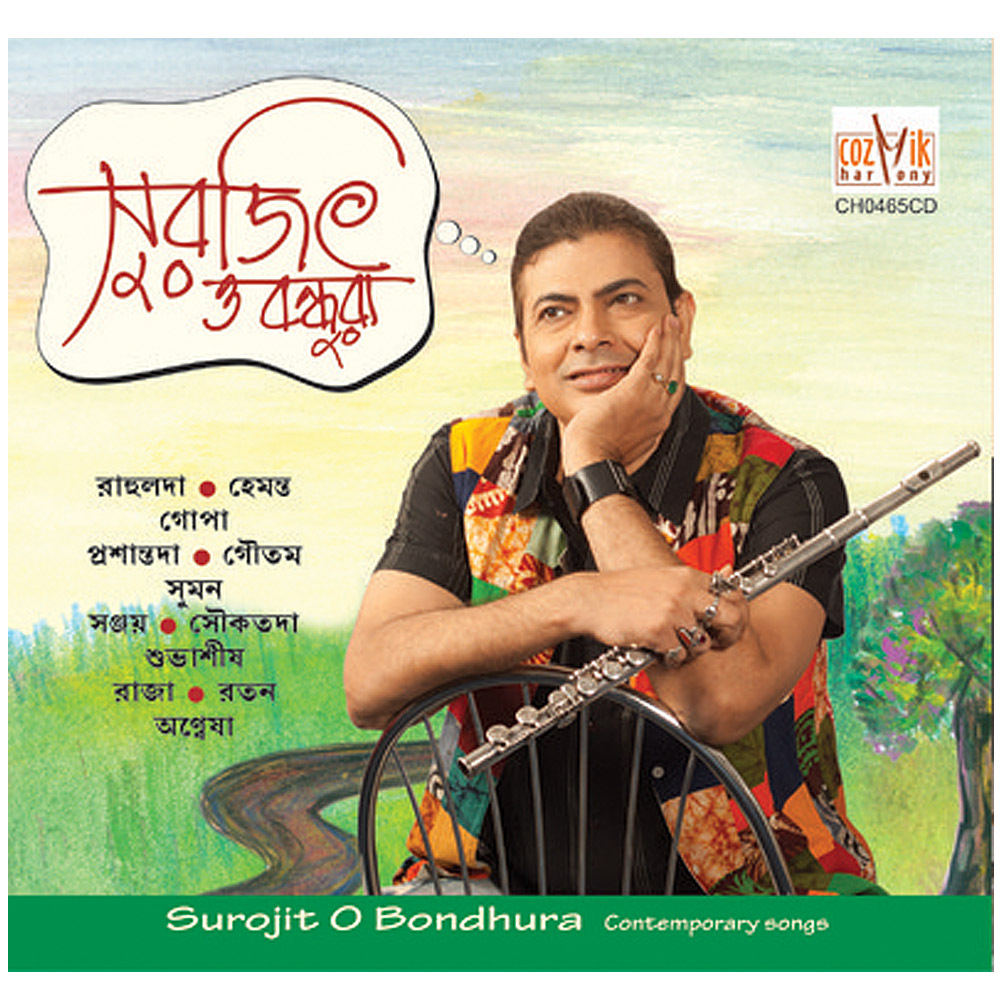
Album Cover – Surojit O Bondhura – Release 2012

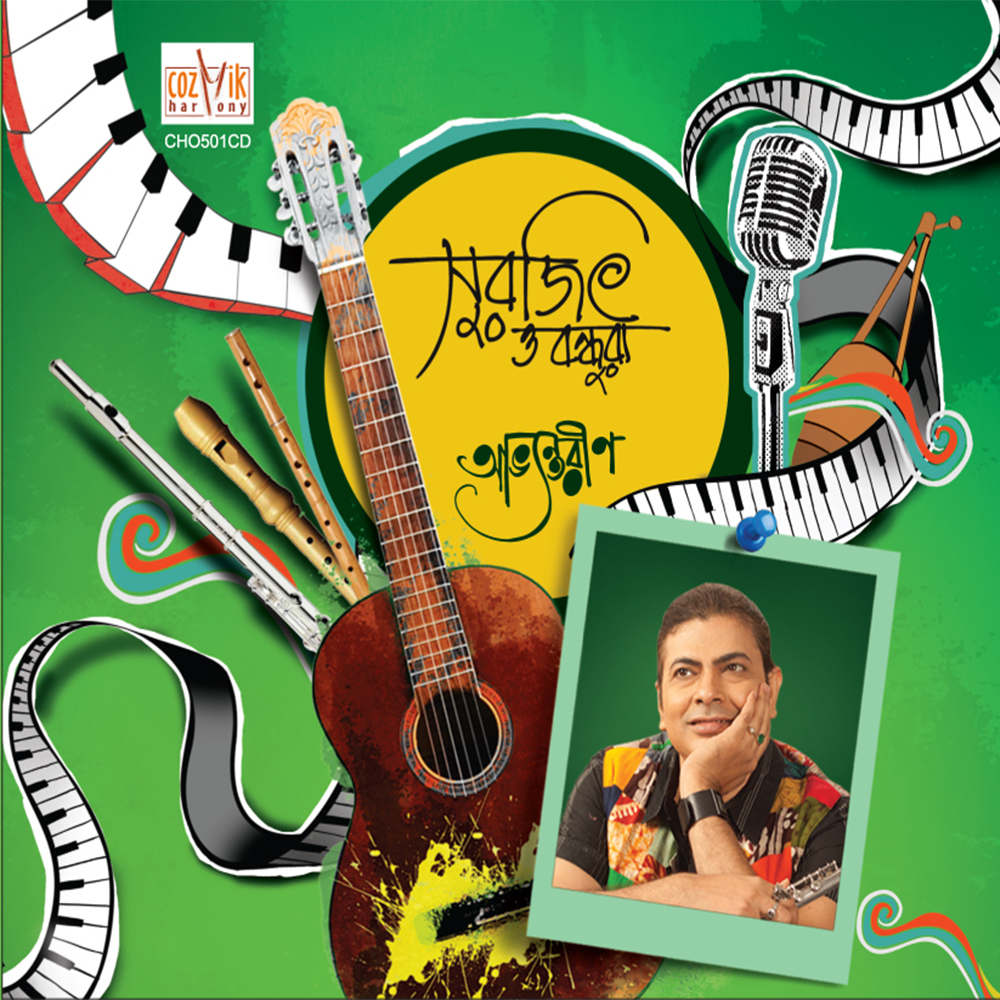
Abhyontoreen – Album Cover – Release 2013

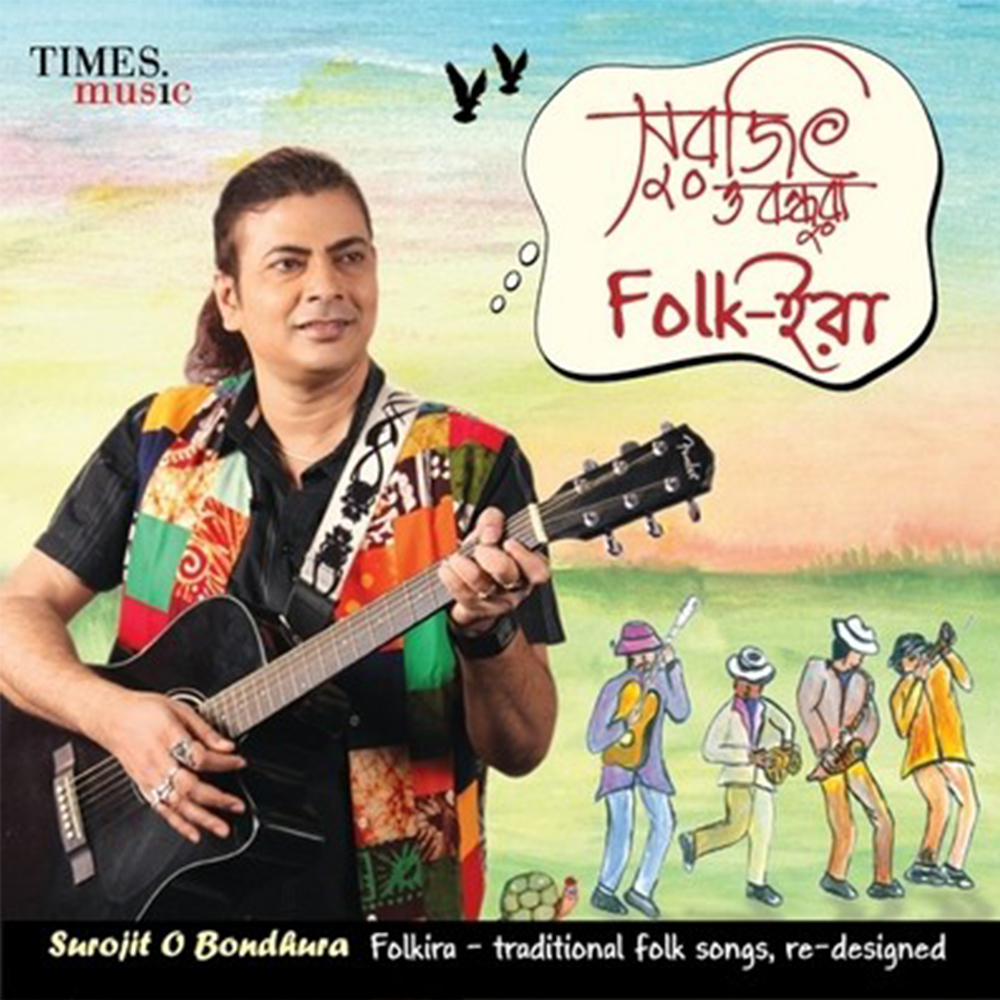
Folkira – Album Cover – Release 2013

Surojit Chatterjee formed his first solo band Surojit O Bondhura in the year 2012 with the leading musicians from Kolkata. He has won the Radio Mirchi best male vocalist of the Year Award in 2012 for his first solo album Surojit O Bondhura and Radio Mirchi Best Album of the Year Award in 2013 for its album Folkira. His second solo album, Abhyontoreen, was released subsequently. This band has also released Folk Konnection, from Asha Audio and Amaar Poran Jaha Chay from Bhabna records in the year 2016.

== Personal life ==
He is married to Kamalinee Chatterjee who has also penned several songs for Surojit O Bondhura albums, as well as for Kon Roopnagare Konnya Tomar Bari and Abhyaontoreen. and has won the Upcoming Lyricist of the year 2012 for the film Muktodhara, for the song ALO. They have a daughter named Annweshaa Chatterjee.

== Filmography ==
Sl No.	Movie name	Director	Music director	Year
1	Kaali Amaar Maa	Shantilal Soni	Surojit Chatterjee	1994
2	Joy Maa Durga	Shantilal Soni	Surojit Chatterjee	1995
3	Handa Bhonda	Subhankar Chattopadhyay	Surojit Chatterjee	2010
4	Sesh Prahar	Rajsekhar Bose	Surojit Chatterjee	2010
5	Icche	Shiboprosad Mukherjee and Nandita Roy	Surojit Chatterjee	2011
6	Muktodhara	Shiboprosad Mukherjee and Nandita Roy	Surojit Chatterjee	2012
7	Holud Pakhir Dana	Kanoj Das	Surojit Chatterjee	2013
8	Gogoler Kirti	Pompy Ghosh Mukherjee	Surojit Chatterjee	12 September 2014
9	Pati Parameshwar	Jayashree Bhattacharya	Surojit Chatterjee	2014
10	Primetime	Ipsita Seal	Surojit Chatterjee	2015
11	Buddhu Bhutum	Nitish Roy	Surojit Chatterjee	2017
12	Kusumitar Goppo	Hrisikesh Mondal	Surojit Chatterjee	2019
13	Raktabeej	Nandita Roy, Shiboprosad Mukherjee	Surojit Chatterjee	2023
14	Raktabeej 2	Nandita Roy, Shiboprosad Mukherjee	Surojit Chatterjee	2025
14	Take Care	Jayashree Mukherjee	Surojit Chatterjee	Upcoming
15	Basanta Phire Ase	Ritabrata	Surojit Chatterjee	Upcoming
16	Durga Bari	Deep	Surojit Chatterjee	Upcoming

Album Cover - Kathopokatha - Folk Feelings - Release 2026

== Discography (Surojit O Bondhura) ==
Sl No.	Album title	Label	Year
1	Surojit O Bondhura	Cozmik Harmony	2012
2	Abhyontoreen – Surojit O Bondhura	Cozmik Harmony	2013
3	Folkira – Surojit O Bondhura	Times Music	2013
4	Folk Konnection	Asha Audio	2015
5	Aamar Poran Jaha Chay	Bhabna Records	2016
6	Amader Barandaye Roddur	Times Music	2016
7	Surojit and Mosaique		2016
8	Kathapokathan - Folk Feelings	Kalling Bells	2026

== Discography (Bhoomi) ==
- Jatra Shuru (2000)
- Udaan (2001)
- Isspecial (2002)
- Paal Chhutechhe (2003)
- Lokogeeti Local (2004)
- Dekhtey Dekhtey (2004)
- Bojhai Kora Ganer Gari (2005)
- Gaan Bahan (2007) (includes the song written in English especially for the UN performance "For A Better Day")
- Lokegeetir Deshe (2008)
- Aamra Notun Jouboner Doot (2009) (Rabindrasangeet by Bhoomi)
- Gaan Doriyae (2010) (Released 8 September)
- Desh Judey (2011) (Hindustani folk songs)
