= Ahmed A-Dahar =

Israeli Arab politician (1906-1984)

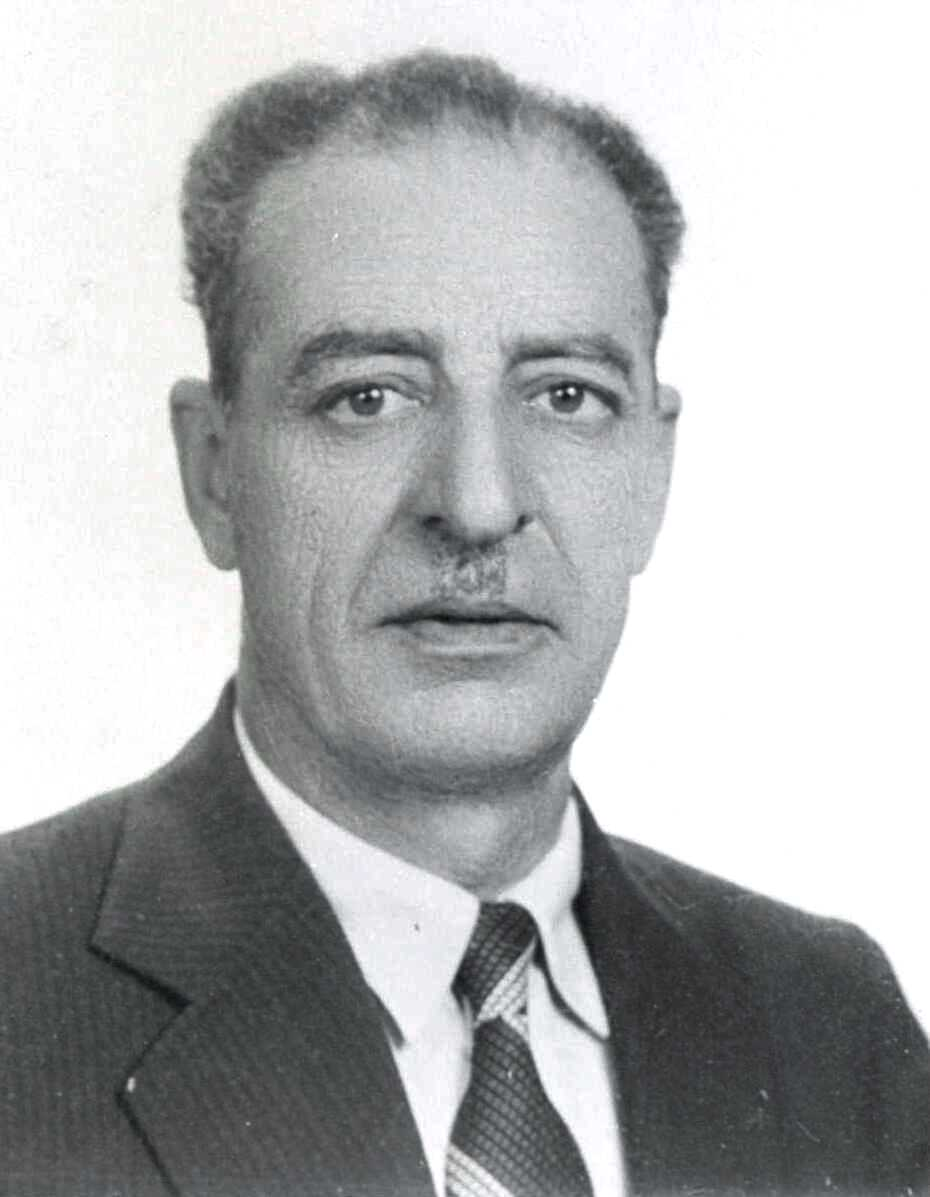
- A-Dahar during his time in the Knesset

Faction represented in the Knesset
- 1959–1965: Progress and Development

Personal details
- Born: 1906 Nazareth, Ottoman Empire
- Died: 6 February 1984 (aged 77–78)

Ahmed Kemal A-Dahar (Arabic: أحمد كامل الظاهر, Hebrew: אחמד כאמל א-ד'אהר; 1906 – 6 February 1984) was an Israeli Arab politician who served as a member of the Knesset for Progress and Development between 1959 and 1965.

== Biography ==
Born in Nazareth during the Ottoman era, A-Dahar was a member of Nazareth's city council for thirty years. In 1959 he was elected to the Knesset on the Progress and Development list. He retained his seat in the 1961 elections, but lost it in the 1965 elections. He died in 1984.
