= Sare Chuattar Ghosh Para =

- Directed by: Soumya Supriyo
- Produced by: Ajit Sureka
- Music by: Ashok Bhadra
- Release date: 2014
- Country: India
- Language: Bengali

Sare Chuattar Ghosh Para is a 2014 Indian Bengali film directed by Soumya Supriyo and produced by Ajit Sureka. The music of the film was composed by Ashok Bhadra.

== Plot ==
The story of the film revolves around Sagnik, Anindya and Kaushi, who live together and dream big. Anindya wants to become a hero, Kaushik is a boxer and is desirous to marry his boxer coach, and Sagnik wants to become a playback singer. However, none of them can pursue their goals for lack of money and other reasons. On day they see an advertisement promising ₹1 crore (US$120,000) and jump for the opportunity.

== Cast ==
- Arnab Banerjee
- Vivek Trivedi
- Pamela
- Partho Sarathi Chakraborty

== Reception ==
The film received mostly negative reviews. in The Times of India critic rating, the film got half out of five stars and wrote this is probably the worst buddy-comedy flick ever made in the history of Indian Cinema.
