= Mimi Chakraborty =

Indian actor and politician (born 1989)

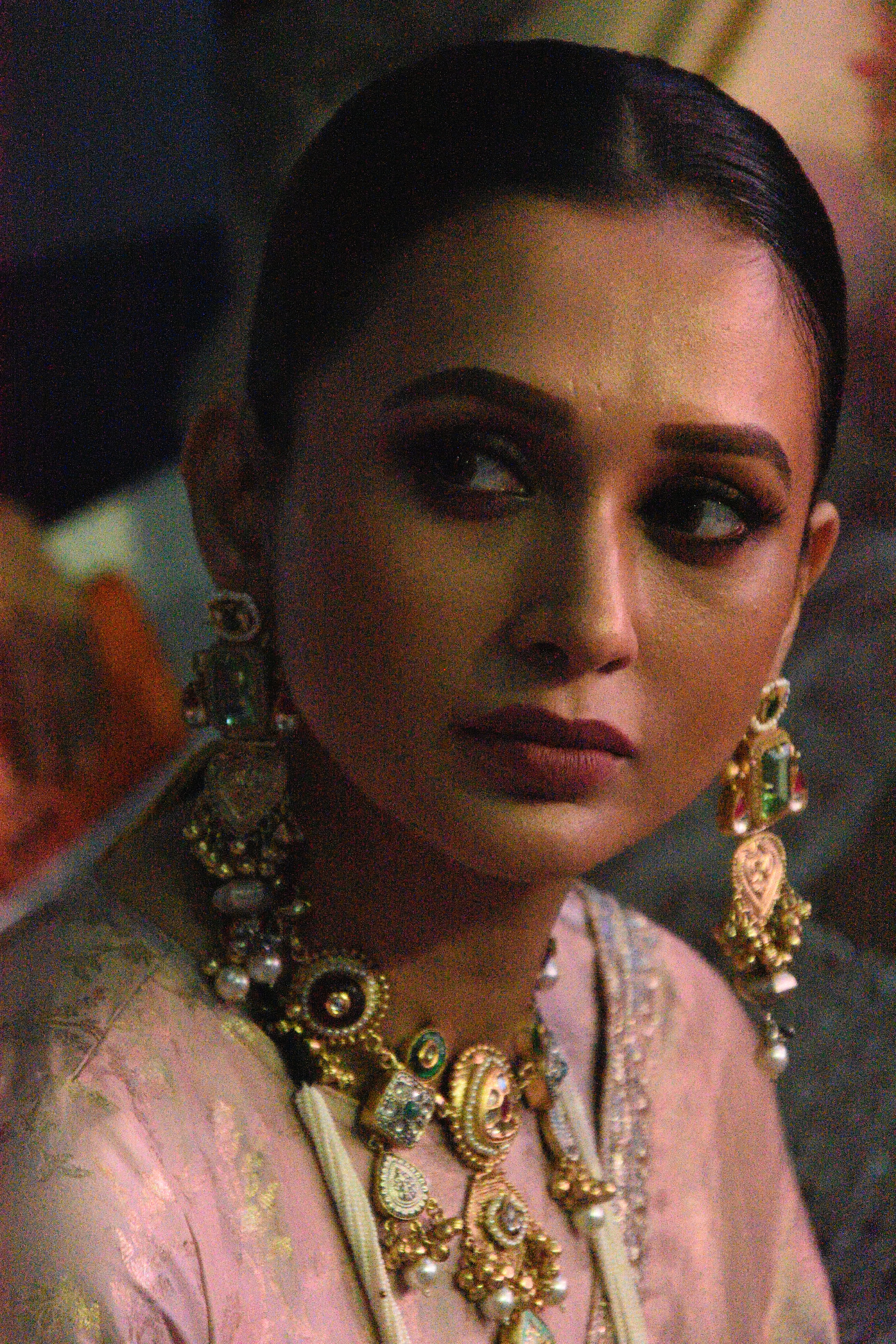
- Chakraborty at the opening function of the KIFF 29 in 2023

Member of Parliament, Lok Sabha
- In office 23 May 2019 – 4 June 2024
- Preceded by: Sugata Bose
- Succeeded by: Saayoni Ghosh
- Constituency: Jadavpur

Personal details
- Party: Trinamool Congress (2019–2024)
- Born: 11 February 1989 (age 37); Jalpaiguri, West Bengal, India
- Education: Asutosh College (BA)
- Occupations: Actress; Model; Politician; Singer
- Years active: 2008–present

Mimi Chakraborty (born 11 February 1989) is an Indian actress, singer and former politician. She is known for her work in Bengali cinema and television. Her debut film was Bapi Bari Jaa in which she played the female lead, Dola.

She was listed as the most desirable woman in the Calcutta Times list of Most Desirable Women 2016 and 2020.

Chakraborty was a Member of Parliament in the 17th Lok Sabha from Jadavpur constituency from 2019 to 2024.

== Early life ==
Chakraborty was born on 11 February 1989. She hails from Jalpaiguri, a city in the Indian state of West Bengal. She spent her childhood in Arunachal Pradesh in Deomali, a town in Tirap district, but later moved back to her ancestral home in Jalpaiguri City with her family. She was educated in Holy Child School, Jalpaiguri and later at St. James' School, Binnaguri. She graduated with a Bachelor of Arts degree in 2011 from Asutosh College in Kolkata. Her parents live in Siliguri.

== Career ==
Chakraborty worked was a model before starting her acting career. She participated in Femina Miss India. Her acting debut was with Champion.

Her second project was a TV serial Gaaner Oparey, produced by Ideas Creations. It aired on Star Jalsha from 28 June 2010 to 16 April 2011. Ideas Creations, the production house of Prosenjit Chatterjee together with Star Jalsha launched the mega-serial Gaaner Oparey to pay tribute to Rabindranath Tagore on the 150th anniversary of his birth. The likes of Rituparno Ghosh (who was initial scriptwriter of Gaaner Oparey), Debojyoti Mishra (music director), and other noted personalities from the film industry were involved with the project.

Her debut film Bapi Bari Jaa was released on 7 December 2012.

=== Gaaner Oparey ===
Gaaner Oparey, was the musical journey between two artists, Bohemian Gora and traditional Pupe and their love and in the whole process reinventing Tagore's "music". The story revolved around a girl called Pupe from an orthodox Tagore-worshipping family and Gora, an extremely talented but care-free lad, who keeps on experimenting with Rabindra Sangeet.

Chakraborty portrayed the role of Pupe, a very talented singer, belonging to an orthodox Tagore worshipping family, who used to sing Rabindra Sangeet in traditional form in concurrence with her family values. She was brilliant in all the emotions and made Pupe iconic.

=== Bapi Bari Jaa ===
Chakraborty's film debut was in Bapi Bari Jaa in which she played the female lead, Dola. The film was produced by Prosenjit Chatterjee production house, Ideas Creations. The film was also the silver-screen debut of Arjun Chakrabarty (better known as Gora, the male protagonist from Gaaner Opaarey) who played the role of Bapi, the male lead.

== Political career ==
In 2019, she joined politics and contested from Jadavpur Loksabha Constituency in 2019 Indian general election as a Trinamool Congress candidate which she won. She was a Member of Parliament in the 17th Lok Sabha from Jadavpur constituency. Chakraborty resigned from her post on 15 February 2024.

== Fashion ==
Chakraborty has been a part of Fame Fashion and Creative Excellence (FFACE) in different ways. In 2014, she unveiled the Edition 1 of the FFACE Calendar at Tantra, Park Hotel Kolkata. The same year she was a part of the conceptual greeting card produced by FFACE as the FFACE of DURGA promoting women empowerment.

== Filmography ==
=== Film ===
Denotes films that have not yet been released

Year	Title	Role	Notes	Ref(s)
2012	Bapi Bari Jaa	Dola	Debut film	
2012	Bojhena Shey Bojhena	Riya		
2013	Proloy	Durga		
2014	Bangali Babu English Mem	Riya		
2014	Golpo Holeo Shotti	Anu		
2014	Yoddha: The Warrior	Rajkumari Durga / Nandini		
2014	Khaad	Punam		
2015	Jamai 420	Tina		
2015	Katmundu	Rai		
2015	Shudhu Tomari Jonyo	Koli		
2016	Ki Kore Toke Bolbo	Anjali		
2016	Kelor Kirti	Reema		
2016	Gangster	Ruhi		
2017	Posto	Sushmita		
2017	Amar Aponjon	Mou	Cameo appearance	
2017	Dhananjoy	Kavya Sinha		
2018	Total Dadagiri	Jonaki		
2018	Uma	Herself	Special Appearance with Dev and Nusrat Jahan	
2018	Crisscross	Ira		
2018	Villain	Ria		
2019	Mon Jaane Na	Pari Banu		
2020	Dracula Sir	Manjari		
2020	SOS Kolkata	Sanjana		
2021	Baazi	Kyra		
2022	Mini	Titli		
2022	Khela Jawkhon	Urmi Chowdhury		
2023	Raktabeej	Sanjukta Mitra		
2023	Shastry Viruddh Shastry	Mallika Shastry	Hindi film	
2024	Palasher Biye	Shalini		
2024	Alaap	Aditi Mitra		
2024	Toofan	Suchona	Bangladeshi film	
2025	Raktabeej 2	Sanjukta Mitra		
2026	Bhanupriya Bhooter Hotel	Nandini		
2026	Phool Pishi O Edward	Segun	Cameo	
2026	Emperor vs Sarat Chandra	Rose Daud / Sumitra		
2026	Hum Hindustani †	TBA	Post-production, Hindi film, Netflix release	

=== Television ===
Year	Serial	Character	Channel	Reference	Production company(s)
2008	Champion	Diya	Akash Bangla		Ideas Creations
2010-11	Gaaner Oparey	Sohini Deb	Star Jalsha		Ideas Creations
2013	Didi No. 1 Season 5	Contestant	Zee Bangla		Zee Bangla Productions
2019	Didi No. 1 Season 8	Winner	Zee Bangla		Zee Bangla Productions
2020	Durga Durgotinashini	Devi Mahamaya and Devi Mahisasurmardini	Star Jalsha		Eyewash Productions
2022	Didi No. 1 Season 9	Contestant	Zee Bangla		Zee Bangla Productions

=== Web series ===
Year	Series	Director	Character	Platform	Note	Reference
2024	Jaha Bolibo Shotto Bolibo	Chandrasish Ray	Pritha Roy	Hoichoi	Market her web series debut	
2025	Dainee	Nirjhar Mitra	Pata	Hoichoi		
2026	Queens	Nirjhar Mitra	Meera Sarkar	Hoichoi		

== Discography ==
Year	Title	Singer	Director	Note	Reference
2019	"Anjana"	Mimi Chakrabarty	Baba Yadav	Debut Single	
2019	"Pal"	Mimi Chakrabarty	Baba Yadav		
2020	"Pari Hun Main"	Mimi Chakrabarty	Baba Yadav		
2020	"Amaro Porano Jaha Chay"	Mimi Chakrabarty		Rabindra Sangeet	
2020	"Tomar Khola Hawa"	Mimi Chakrabarty		Rabindra Sangeet	
2022	"Let's 1xbat"	Mimi Chakrabarty			

== Awards ==
Year	Awards	Category	Films	Ref.
2011	Tele Samman	Telekonya	Gaaner Opaarey	
2013	Big Bangla Rising Star Awards	Rising Star (Female)	Bapi Bari Ja	
2013	71st Annual BFJA Awards	Best Promising Actress	Bapi Bari Ja	
2016	Tele Cine Awards	Best Jodi	Katmundu	
2017	Star Jalsha Parivar Award	Best Jodi	Ki Kore Toke Bolbo	With Ankush Hazra
2025	Tele Cine Awards	Best Actor in a leading role (Female) OTT	Dainee	
2025	TV 9 Bangla Ghorer Bioscope Awards	Best Actress in a Leading Role (OTT)	Dainee	
