= Dainee =

2025 Indian Bengali survival thriller series

- Teaser Poster
- Genre: Psychological horror Survival thriller
- Based on: Witch hunts in India
- Written by: Nirjhar Mitra; Shayak Roy; Nilanjan Chakraborty
- Screenplay by: Nirjhar Mitra
- Directed by: Nirjhar Mitra
- Starring: Mimi Chakraborty; Koushani Mukherjee; Sudip Mukherjee; Biswajit Das
- Theme music composer: Mainak Mazoomdar
- Composer: Mainak Mazoomdar
- Country of origin: India
- Original language: Bengali
- No. of seasons: 1
- No. of episodes: 6

Production
- Cinematography: Turja Ghosh
- Editor: Subhajit Singha
- Running time: 20-24 minutes
- Production company: No Country Films Production

Original release
- Release: 14 March 2025

Dainee (transl. Witch) is a 2025 Indian Bengali dark survival, psychological horror, thriller web series. Directed by Nirjhar Mitra and written by Mitra along with Shayak Roy and Nilanjan Chakraborty, the series was streamed on the OTT platform Hoichoi on 14 March 2025. Produced by No Country Films Production, the series revolves around the themes of witch hunting, rural Bengal's dark realities, psychological tension, folklore, and the fight against oppression.

The series stars Mimi Chakraborty in the lead role and Koushani Mukherjee Zanjeen in the titular role. Sudip Mukherjee and Biswajit Das play other pivotal roles. Mainak Mazoomdar composed the background score while Subhajit Singha handled the editing and Turja Ghosh did the cinematography. This series marks Mimi Chakraborty's second OTT venture after Jaha Bolibo Sotto Bolibo. Critics widely applauded the direction, acting, background score, cinematography, and referred to Mimi's performance as her career-best one.

== Synopsis ==
Pata and Lata are two half siblings living in the fictional village of Khuniabari in North Bengal. While Pata is the legitimate child of her parents, Lata was the illegitimate product of Pata's father's extramarital affair. He worked in a tea-estate in Dooars. Pata and Lata shared a cat and dog relationship since childhood. Pata lost her mother to cancer in her childhood. After it, she realised that she must move out of that place in order to live a better life. So, she left home in her childhood with her lover and settled in foreign after marrying him.

One day, she received the news of her father's death. Driven by the urge to take her share in the property, she returned back to India. She found out that as per the will, the property could be divided only when the two sisters are together. So, despite having deep seated hatred for Lata, she returned to her village Khuniabari. Upon reaching, she found an injured Lata, tied to a bamboo post and on the verge of being burnt alive for the well being of the village, after she was accused of witchcraft by the village chieftain Bhim Kumar Maheli a.k.a. Jaanguru. As the story unfolds, Pata fights the deep rooted superstitions and sinister forces in a desperate war for survival and justice, to save herself and her sister, forgetting all the differences and hatred which existed between them.

== Cast ==
- Mimi Chakraborty as Pata, Lata's half-sibling
  - Anumegha Kahali as young Pata
- Koushani Mukherjee Zanjeen as Lata, Pata's half-sibling
- Sudip Mukherjee as Lata and Pata's father
- Biswajit Das as Bhim Kumar Maheli a.k.a. Jaanguru, the village chieftain
- Maithal as Jaanguru's son
- Shayak Roy as doctor of the local healthcare center
- Anirudhya Mashid as Santosh, Lata's lover turned husband
- Sujit Kumar Barman as Badsha, Pata's driver
- Shruti Das as Moni, Jaanguru's sister

== Production ==
=== Announcement ===
Hoichoi announced Dainee on 15 October 2024 along 10 other web series including Nikosh Chhaya, Bishohori, Kaalratri, Puro Puri Eken and others. They were announced as part of Hoichoi's "Hoichoi Festive Premiere" for their upcoming web series scheduled to release in 2025.

=== Development ===
Director Nirjhar Mitra conceived the idea about making this web series in 2014-15. He developed the concept about a tale of two sisters which revolves around the ideas of witch hunting and victimization of women, which is still prevalent in rural areas of India, particularly in the tribal dominated belts. Although Mitra was a bit hesitant initially about the relevance of the topic in the 21st century, later he came across several data and statistics which validated its relevance.

On 18 October 2024, a short glimpse was released which served as the first look video of Mimi Chakraborty as the protagonist. It marked the second OTT venture of Mimi Chakraborty after she made her OTT debut as a lawyer in the courtroom drama Jaha Bolibo Sotto Bolibo in 2024, which premiered on Hoichoi. The series marked the OTT debut of the television actress Shruti Das.

=== Filming ===
Most of the filming was done in a village in Jalpaiguri, North Bengal.

== Themes ==
- Raw portrayal of rural Bengal

Dainee portrays the raw picture of rural Bengal with its dark and often less spoken about superstitions. In many places of India including Bengal, particularly in the tribal dominated patriarchal belts, women are being victimised and often labelled as a dainee or witch. A woman is often blamed for practising witchcraft and sorcery, and she is held responsible for death of her husband or father. The series revolves around the dark superstitious practice of witch hunt, still prevalent in certain parts of Bengal, and the idea of survival by defying the age old social conventions. In the series, Lata gets branded as a witch and Pata tries to get her brutally injured sister out of the knuckles of the villagers.

- The bonding and essence of sisterhood

Dainee explores the cavernous bonding of sisterhood. Pata, despite having a cat and dog relationship with Lata since childhood, stands firmly by her side and fights against all the odds in order to save her sister from being burnt alive after being branded as a witch by the village chieftain Bhim Kumar Maheli. The series shows how Pata fights tooth and nail against the world to save themselves from horrors of a vicious circle of witch hunt prevalent in rural Bengal.

- Psychological tension melts with folklore

The series blends in the elements of mystery, superstition, dark reality and suspense to create a survival thriller drama, which is not about jump scares but an unsettling uneasy feeling that lingers long. The director has combined psychological tension with folklore, creating a new, unexplored genre in the Bengali film and OTT industry. In the series, wars aren't fought with fists and guns, but psychological pressure and shifting alliances. The locked gates of the local health center has been displayed as the physical and symbolic barrier between two parties. Both sides use a tense series of negotiations in which family members have been used as bargaining chips and exchange commodities.

== Episodes ==
| No. | Title | Directed by | Written by | Original release date |
|---|---|---|---|---|
| 1 | "Otit-er Taaney" | Nirjhar Mitra | Nirjhar Mitra, Shayak Roy, Nilanjan Chakraborty | March 14, 2024 |
| 2 | "Ashani Shanket" | Nirjhar Mitra | Nirjhar Mitra, Shayak Roy, Nilanjan Chakraborty | March 14, 2024 |
| 3 | "Chaal Bodol" | Nirjhar Mitra | Nirjhar Mitra, Shayak Roy, Nilanjan Chakraborty | March 14, 2024 |
| 4 | "Biswashghatok" | Nirjhar Mitra | Nirjhar Mitra, Shayak Roy, Nilanjan Chakraborty | March 14, 2024 |
| 5 | "Obhaagi" | Nirjhar Mitra | Nirjhar Mitra, Shayak Roy, Nilanjan Chakraborty | March 14, 2024 |
| 6 | "Shesh Sanghat" | Nirjhar Mitra | Nirjhar Mitra, Shayak Roy, Nilanjan Chakraborty | March 14, 2024 |

== Marketing ==
The first poster of the series, which also served as the first look poster of Mimi Chakraborty from the film, was released on 11 February 2025. An announcement video which also served as a first look teaser of the series that introduced the characters, was released on 21 February 2025. The trailer of the series was released on 7 March 2025 on Hoichoi's YouTube channel.

== Release ==
Dainee premiered on the OTT platform Hoichoi on 14 March 2025 with a U/A 16+ certificate.

== Reception ==
=== Critical reception ===
Sayani Rana of the Hindustan Times rated the series 4/5 stars and wrote "Daine is about the witch which resides in the uneducated depths of our hearts. Nirjhar has shed light on the dark side of society through his series. Bengali viewers have been gifted a completely fresh story based on this series." She praised Mimi Chakraborty's facile acting and corporeal display, the short but eye-drawing acting of Koushani, Biswajit Das' ominous expressions and Nirjhar Mitra's direction. She also applauded the story-writing, cinematography as well as the background score.

Poorna Banerjee of The Times of India rated the series 3/5 stars and termed it as "A tense, socially relevant gripping thriller with powerful performances, particularly from Mimi Chakraborty. Her commanding performance elevates the series, making it an engaging experience despite its flaws." She also added "The series maintains a fast-paced, grim tone with little room for humour. The narrative is straightforward, with flashbacks providing context to the power dynamics at play. While the cinematography and tight editing enhance the intensity, the music and background score effectively heighten the drama."

Agnivo Niyogi of High On Films reviewed the series and noted "The director keeps the tension razor-sharp: the back-and-forth of hostage negotiations, betrayals, and shifting alliances ensures that every moment feels unpredictable. The constant back-and-forth between timelines could have easily disrupted the tension, but tight direction ensures they flow seamlessly." He particularly praised the performances of Mimi Chakraborty and Biswajit Das and termed them as "Every flicker of emotion on her face feels raw and lived-in" and "a masterclass in quiet menace", respectively. He also applauded the cinematography, editing and the background score.

Biswadip Ray of Sangbad Pratidin reviewed the series and highlighted "The story of this fast paced series seems to be somewhat slowed down at times due to the non-linear storytelling. A sudden flashback at a moment of intense suspense can be a bit of a letdown. But that's not always the case. Overall, this web series is not only able to keep the viewer hooked, but it also makes you wonder at every moment what's going to happen next." He also complimented the directors vision behind creating every character, the screenplay, Biswajit Das' corporeal acting which splashes cruelty, the dialogues, cinematography and the apt background music.

Parama Dasgupta of Aajkal reviewed the series and opined "The acting is undoubtedly the biggest asset of this film. Although the flashbacks in the story told in a non-linear timeline slow down the pace by one and a half times, its appeal is not lost at all." She praised the acting acumen of Mimi Chakraborty, Koushani Mukherjee and Biswajit Das and the nail-biting editing but bemoaned the excessive use of violence, which according to him, adds nothing to the plot.

Pratim D. Gupta reviewed the series for t2 Online and wrote "Dainee is more than just a thriller; it's a powerful social commentary on how regressive traditions continue to claim lives, even one quarter into the 21st century. Nirjhar's vision makes Dainee an immersive, multi-layered experience. It's his grip on tone, pacing, and atmosphere that makes every element work in perfect unison." He specially praised the acting prowess of Mimi Chakraborty and Biswajit Das and worded them as "a masterclass in controlled intensity" and "nothing encapsulates his menace more than that smirky grin that drips with condescension and cruelty", respectively. He also applauded the cinematography, editing and background score.

== Controversy ==
A controversy erupted on social media when television host and actress Paroma Banerjee Dainee to a jatra-type production. This comment received widespread criticism from fellow artistes and the audience, for being derogatory towards Bengal's traditional folk theatre. Veteran Jatra performer Kakoli Choudhury and prominent actors including Rahul Banerjee and Swastika Mukherjee criticised Paroma Chatterjee for being insensitive towards the struggles associated with a jatra performance and the raw talent of the artistes performing it.
