= Gogoler Kirti =

- Theatrical release poster
- Directed by: Pompy Ghosh Mukherjee
- Screenplay by: Smaranjit Chakraborty; Pompy Ghosh Mukherjee
- Story by: Samaresh Basu
- Based on: Royraja Uddhar and Mahishmardini Uddhar by Samaresh Basu
- Produced by: Supratik Ghosh
- Starring: Ahijit Ghosh; Indraneil Sengupta; Vikram Chatterjee; Saheb Chatterjee; Locket Chatterjee
- Cinematography: Shashanka Palit
- Music by: Surojit Chatterjee
- Production company: Ishani Films
- Distributed by: Ishani Films
- Release date: 12 September 2014
- Running time: 135 min.
- Country: India
- Language: Bengali

Gogoler Kirti (or Gogol-er Kirti; Bengali: গোগোল-এর কীর্তি) is a 2014 Indian Bengali film, directed by Pompy Ghosh Mukherjee and produced by Supratik Ghosh under the banner of Ishani Films. Based on the story Royraja Uddhar and Mahishmardini Uddhar by Samaresh Basu, the film features child actor Ahijit Ghosh, Vikram Chatterjee and Indraneil Sengupta in the lead roles. It is the sequel of 2013 film Goyenda Gogol. The film was released on 12 September 2014.

== Cast ==
- Ahijit Ghosh as Gogol
- Indraneil Sengupta as Ashok Thakur
- Locket Chatterjee as Gogol's mother
- Saheb Chatterjee as Gogol's father
- Shakuntala Barua
- Tanima Sen
- Biswajit Chakraborty as Roy Raja
- Bhaswar Chattopadhyay as Rajat
- Maliha Nosraat as Rishad
- Vikram Chatterjee as Joy / Magic Dada
- Subhasish Mukhopadhyay as Yadab and Madhab (Double role)

== Plot ==
Based on Samaresh Basu's popular Gogol (Detective) fiction Mahish Mardini Uddhar and Rai Raja Uddhar, the film unfolds with a 'sabeki'(Traditional) puja in a Bengal village, where all members of the once-royal household assemble during that time of year and Gogol will take us back to the time when joint households were in vogue. Gogol is in a way the younger version of Feluda who is gadget savvy, knows mob applications, has contemporary tastes and upbringing but still loves to be in a joint family and calls its members 'pisi-na kaka-didibhai-chhotomama etc. He never uses a tab but sharpens his 'magojastro'.

== Production ==
=== Shooting ===
The film was shot in Baruipur at Baruipur Rajbari, Purulia and Bolpur.

== Music ==
Gogoler Kirti

Soundtrack album by: Surojit Chatterjee
- Released: 2014
- Genre: Feature film soundtrack

Surojit Chatterjee chronology
Kkoli – A Journey of Love (2014)	Gogoler Kirti (2014)

Music Direction by Surojit Chatterjee. Singer Usha Uthup sung the title track (Go Gogol Go) for Gogoler Kirti.

== Critical reception ==
Professional ratings
Review scores
Source	Rating
The Times of India	3/5 stars
Timescity	3/5 stars
Gomolo	2.5/5 stars
Now Running	2/5 stars
BookMyShow	9.3/10 stars

Gogoler Kirti received generally good reviews from critics. The Times of India gave the film 3 stars out of 5, and said "A thriller is halfway there if the location is convincing enough and Gogol Er Kirti, with its old bonedi bari and mysterious temples, scores high in this regard. Debutante director Pompy Ghosh Mukherjee has given serious thought to the location for her detective story and that has paid off". Aditya Chakrabarty of Gomolo gave it 2 and a half tars and said "Ahijit Ghosh as back as Gogol in his 2nd venture as the child detective (created by Samaresh Basu) after Goyendar Gogol. After being E.P for the 1s one, she turns director with this film with Gogol going to Mohon Kunja to solve a mystery after the Puri Incident (the 1st time). Gogol goes to Mohon Kunja, a palace situated near Kolkata which belongs to the aristocratic family from which Narendranath(friend of Gogol's father Samiresh). At his insistence, the family goes there during the pujas. Over there Gogol comes across several characters all of whom are/are not part of the family and the interesting ones are in fact not part of the family. It seems there is a connection of the manuscripts which Joy(Vikram), a history student staying at the place is hell bent on deciphering along with Gogol and when the Mahish-Mardini, the local deity of the family goes missing, hell breaks loose. Along with the 2 names mentioned below, Askok Thakur( Indraneil Sengupta) employed by Crime Branch and Gogol's old friend is also on the trail of these art thieves. Who is the thief or is there more than 1? The film is an entertaining children's film with several actors and actresses who are part of the star cast. Mousumi seems to have been wasted again after the 1st part. Her real life husband Jack who plays Narendranath is good as he plays a restrained role. Indraneil Sengupta plays a supporting role to Gogol. Ahijit Ghosh also lives up to his name as Gogol after GG. Instead of Payel Khatun, here he has the director's daughter who plays a bit role. Sumit Sammadar unfortunately has the role of a dumb person and has no dialogues! Vikram has an extended role as Joy and does justice, but was there any requirement to the negativity related to his role?? Bhaswar Chatterjee and Subhasish Mukherjee play negative characters, roles in which are hardly seen. There are hardly any songs in the film barring one where Surajit Chatterjee plays himself. However was it required?? There seems to be an excess of branding in the films which seems to be forced and tries to make it evident. Such a level of branding in a children's film? Well, well, times are changing! The setting is perfect for such a film as most of the film seems to have shot at Baruipur Rajbari".

== See also ==
- Goyenda Gogol
- Samaresh Basu
