= Holud Pakhir Dana =

2013 Indian Bengali-language film

- Theatrical release poster
- Directed by: Kanoj Das
- Screenplay by: Subrata Bhadra
- Story by: Bidu Das
- Produced by: Bidu Das
- Starring: Dibyendu Mukherjee; Rimjhim Gupta; Sabyasachi Chakraborty; Anuradha Ray
- Cinematography: Kamal Nayak
- Edited by: M. Sushmit
- Music by: Surojit Chatterjee
- Production company: Dapro Film Production
- Distributed by: Dapro Film Production
- Release date: 12 April 2013 (Kolkata)
- Country: India
- Language: Bengali

Holud Pakhir Dana (English: The Yellow Wings) is a 2013 Bengali film, directed by Kanoj Das and produced by Bidu Das under the banner of Dapro Film Production. The film features actors Dibyendu Mukherjee and Rimjhim Gupta in the lead roles. Surojit Chatterjee composed the music for this film. It was released on 12 April 2013.

== Plot ==
Riju is a doctor who was severely harmed when he was hit by a car. The car belonged to Saheli, who is also a doctor. Saheli then tried to nurse Riju so that he regained his health. She kept Riju at her residence for a period and as days passed, they fell in love. When Riju returned home, he discovered that his mother had died. He then went to Mathurapur when a doctor called him from there to inform him many villagers were ill due to consumption of spurious liquor. On the other hand, Saheli learned that she had cancer and went to the "Painless Life Centre" and stayed there. Riju tried to find out the whereabouts of Saheli one day since they had not been in touch for a long time. He landed at the Centre one day and took Saheli back home as he wanted her to be by his side during her last days. She died a few days later.

== Cast ==
=== Main ===
- Dibyendu Mukherjee as Riju
- Rimjhim Gupta as Saheli

=== Supporting ===
- Sabyasachi Chakraborty as Dr Anirban
- Sonia Kohli as Doctor
- Anuradha Ray as Riju's mother
- Kalyani Mondal as Saheli's mother
- Ramen Raychowdhury as a doctor
- Monu Mukhopadhyay as the servant in Riju's house
- Nimai Ghosh
- Bidyut Das
- Sangeeta Sanyal

== Soundtrack ==
Holud Pakhir Dana

Soundtrack album to Holud Pakhir Dana by Surojit Chatterjee
- Released: 29 March 2013
- Genre: Feature film soundtrack
- Length: 34:12
- Language: Bengali

The soundtrack of Holud Pakhir Dana has been composed by Surojit Chatterjee. The music release took place on 29 March 2013 at the South City Mall auditorium in the presence of All India Trinamool Congress M.P. Arup Biswas.

=== Track listing ===
No.	Title	Singer(s)	Length
1.	"Aaj Meghla Din (Version 1)"	Surojit Chatterjee	2:48
2.	"Aaj Meghla Din (Version 2)"	Raghab Chatterjee	4:57
3.	"Aami Aami (Duet)"	Shaan, June Banerjee	4:28
4.	"Aami Aami (Female)"	June Banerjee	4:28
5.	"Aami Megher Kol Chaine"	Surojit Chatterjee, Nipabithi Ghosh	4:57
6.	"Holud Pakhir Danaye"	Shaan	4:03
7.	"Lagche Lagche Bhalo"	Uttam Sarkar	3:25
8.	"Aaj Meghla Din (Sad Version)"	Surojit Chatterjee	5:06
Total length:			34:12

== Critical reception ==
Professional ratings
Review scores
Source	Rating
Gomolo	2/5 stars

Holud Pakhir Dana received mostly negative remarks from reviewers. Gomolo users rated it 2 out of 5 stars. Aditya Chakrabarty of Gomolo said, "Films made by Kanoj Das have had much stronger lines and social messages in the past, but this film is an exception. This is one soppy tearjerker and neither the story nor the performances are strong to hold your attention."

== Controversy ==
"I haven't heard the Cactus song. The film is based on a story by Bidu Das. Every colour has a different emotional connect and yellow is no different. It's also my heroine's favourite colour in the film."

— Director Kanoj Das about the controversy on the title

Members of the Bengali band Cactus claimed that the title Holud Pakhir Dana was inspired from their popular number "Holud Pakhi" and complained that the film gave no credits to the band.

Band member Sidhu said, "It's undoubtedly inspired from our track. Tomorrow, someone might come up with a title like Bhebe Dekhechho Ki and not give credit to "Mohiner Ghoraguli". We are not asking for royalty, but credit where it's due. In between, a film called Sudhu Tumi Elena had released. Everyone knows we also have a song by that name."

Drummer Baji said, ""Holud Pakhi" is not just popular amongst the younger generation. Even those who do not follow music, also know about the song."
