= Dohar (band) =

Indian folk music musical ensemble

Dohar দোহার
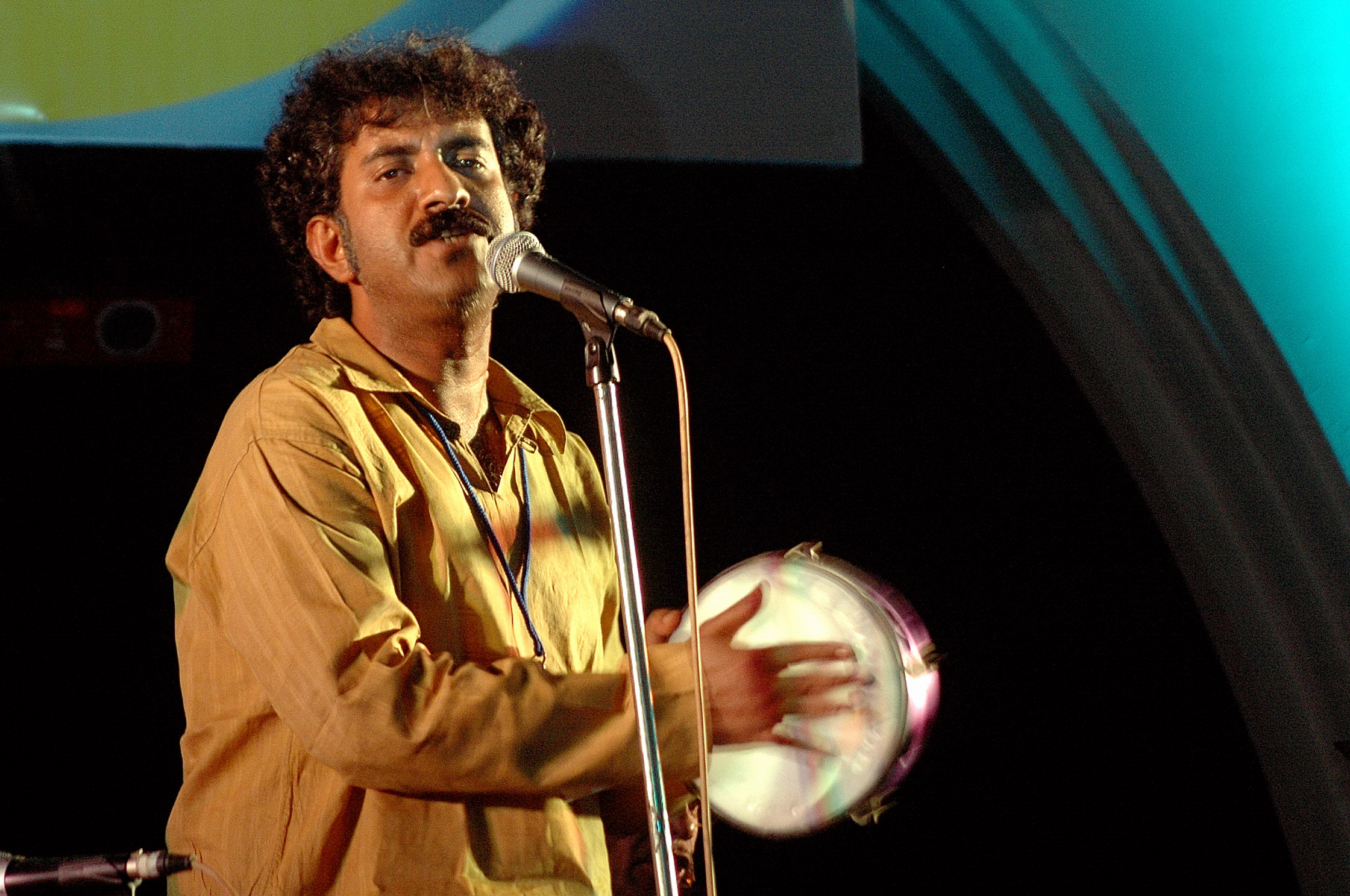
- Kalika Prasad Bhattacharya, founder member of Dohar in one of their folk concerts.

Background information
- Origin: Kolkata, West Bengal. India
- Genres: Bengali Folk Music
- Years active: 1999–present
- Labels: Concord Music, Sony Music, His Master's Voice, Orion Entertainment, Picasso Entertainment
- Members: Rajib Das (Team Leader), Rittik Guchait, Mrignabhi Chattopadhyay, Satyajit Sarkar, Niranjan Haldar, Amit Sur, Sudipto Chakraborty
- Past members: Kalika Prasad Bhattacharjee
- Website: http://www.doharfolk.com/

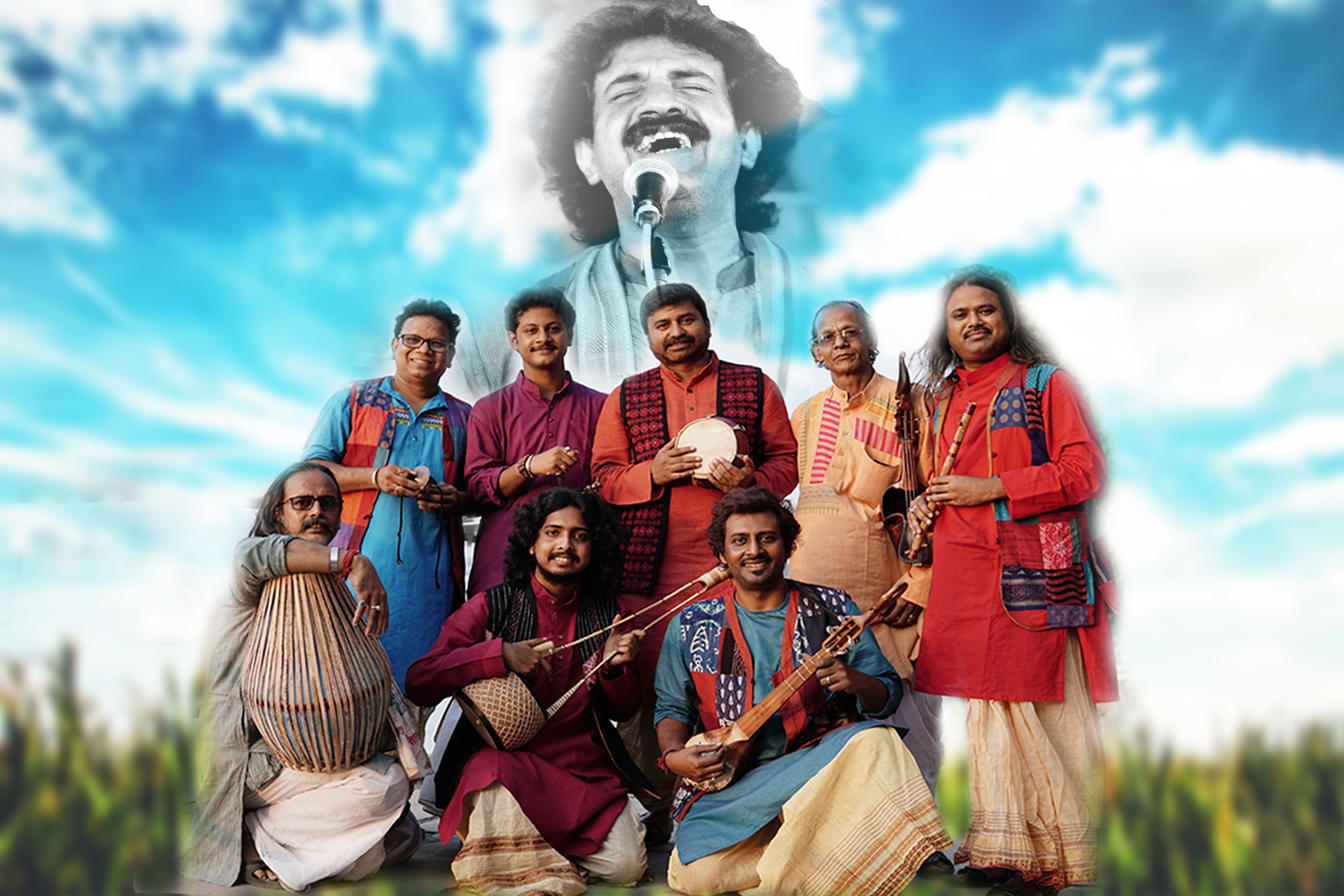
Team DOHAR - a group of folk musicians

Dohar (Bengali: দোহার) is an Indian folk music musical ensemble that specializes in the styles of greater Bengal as well as the North East India. It is very popular in the Indian states of West Bengal, Assam and in Bangladesh.

Dohar has popularised Bengali and Assamese folk music. They have played for various Bengali communities in India and abroad.

== History ==
The group was co-founded by Rajib Das and Kalika Prasad Bhattacharya on 7 August 1999. Both the members came to Kolkata from Barak Valley of Assam. The name of the band 'Dohar' was given by Aveek Majumdar, Professor of Jadavpur University. Dohar means 'chorus'. Kalika Prasad Bhattacharya and Rajib Das both were the lead singers and leader of Dohar. Bhattacharya died in a road accident near Gurap village in Hooghly district on 7 March 2017, aged 47. 5 other members were also injured. The remaining members of the band have continued singing under the leadership of Rajib Das.

== Members ==
Sources:

- Kalikaprasad Bhattacharjee.
- Rajib Das.
- Rittik Guchait
- Mrignabhi Chattopadhyay
- Satyajit Sarkar
- Niranjan Haldar
- Amit Sur
- Sudipto Chakraborty
- Rahul Karmakar

== Albums & Music CDs ==
- “Bandhur Deshey” by Concord Records India – 2001
- “Banglar gaan Shikorer Taan” by Sony Music – 2002
- “Rupsagare” by Saregama – 2004
- “Bangla” by Saregama – 2006
- “2007” by Saregama – 2007
- “MATI’SWAR” by ORION ENTERTAINMENT – 2009
- “MATIR KELLA” – Video Album, a Musical Documentary of Folk Music of Bengal by Saregama – 2011
- “BAUL FOKIRER RABINDRANATH” by ORION ENTERTAINMENT – 2012
- “SAHASRA DOTARA” by ORION ENTERTAINMENT – 2013
- “UNISHER DAAK” – by PICASSO ENTERTAINMENT-2015
- “Rajib Das remembers Kalikaprasad” – by Rajib Das 2018
