= Ghare & Baire =

2018 Indian Bengali film

- Release poster
- Directed by: Mainak Bhaumik
- Written by: Mainak Bhaumik
- Screenplay by: Shabbir Mallik
- Produced by: Nispal Singh
- Starring: Jisshu Sengupta; Koel Mallick
- Cinematography: Supriyo Dutt
- Edited by: Shomnath Dey
- Music by: Anupam Roy
- Production company: Surinder Films
- Distributed by: Surinder Films
- Release date: 30 March 2018
- Running time: 120 minutes
- Country: India
- Language: Bengali

Ghare & Baire is a 2018 Bengali language romantic drama film directed and written by Mainak Bhaumik and produced by Surinder Films. The film stars Jisshu Sengupta and Koel Mullick in lead roles. The film was released theatrically on 30 March 2018.

== Plot ==
The film explores the concept of love, passion, and separation in a modern context. Amit and Labanya are childhood friends. Years later, Amit returns to Kolkata leaving behind his corporate job in Mumbai to pursue music. He realizes his love for Labanya but is reluctant to profess. On the other hand, Labanya is extremely pressurized by her parents to enter into an arranged marriage with an NRI. Amit experiences a heartbreak when Labanya agrees to the arrangement. But when the marriage was about to happen then Amit enters the venue and escapes with Labanya in which the latter is helped by her father. After that, on the banks of Ganga, Amit finally proposed to Labanya to which she accepts.

== Cast ==
- Jisshu Sengupta as Amit
- Koel Mullick as Labanya
- Aparajita Adhya as Sohini
- Biswanath Basu as Bonto
- Monami Ghosh as Rukmini
- Tanima Sen
- Swagata Basu
- Joy Sengupta as Sam

== Soundtrack ==
Track listing
No.	Title	Singer(s)	Length
1.	"Hridoyer Rong"	Lagnajita Chakraborty	2:42
2.	"Shonakathi"	Somlata Acharyya Chowdhury	2:30
3.	"Tui Ki Kore Dili"	Anupam Roy	2:45
4.	"Tara Khoshe Pore"	Anupam Roy, Monali Thakur	2:15
5.	"Kanna Amar"	Savvy	2:45
