= Suchitra Bhattacharya =

Indian novelist (1950–2015)

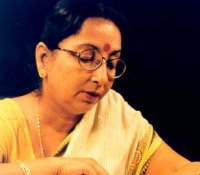
- Born: 10 January 1950; Bhagalpur, India
- Died: 12 May 2015 (aged 65); Dhakuria, Kolkata, India
- Education: University of Calcutta
- Occupation: Writer
- Writing career
- Notable works: Hemanter Pakhi; Dahan; Kachher Manush

Suchitra Bhattacharya (10 January 1950 – 12 May 2015) was an Indian novelist, known for works including Hemanter Pakhi, Kachher Manush, Aleek Shukh, Icche and Kacher Dewal. During her career as a writer, she composed over 20 novels and many short stories. Her novel Dahan was adapted into the 1997 film Dahan, and her novels Iccher Gach, Alik Sukh and Ramdhanu Rang were adapted into films by Shiboprosad Mukherjee, and her novel Onnyo Bwasanto was adapted into a television film by Aditi Roy.

== Early life and education ==
Suchitra Bhattacharya was born in 1950 in Bhagalpur, Bihar. She was interested in writing from her childhood.

Bhattacharya graduated from the Jogamaya Devi College, an affiliated undergraduate women's college of the historic University of Calcutta, in Kolkata.

== Career ==
Having taken many odd jobs in her early youth, she finally joined the public service, leaving in 2004 to become a full-time writer. She started writing in the late-1970s, and novels in the mid-1980s, finding early success with her novel Kacher Dewal (Glass Wall).

Her writing focuses on contemporary social issues. Her life experiences are reflected in many of her stories and novels. Bhattacharya was enthusiastic about fellow contemporary women author Tilottama Majumdar, and was deeply influenced by Ashapurna Devi and Mahasweta Devi.

Her novels and short stories have been translated into Hindi, Tamil, Telugu, Malayalam, Oriya, Marathi, Gujarati, Punjabi and English. She has also written novels and short stories for children.

Her novel Dahan was made into the 1997 film Dahan by Bengali director Rituparno Ghosh. The short story "Ichcher Gaach" was also made into a full-length feature film Icche, directed by Shiboprosad Mukherjee and Nandita Roy. "Hemonter Pakhi" was also made into a feature film by Urmi Chakraborty.

Suchitra Bhattacharya also contributed to the Bengali adult crime fiction genre with her detective character Mitin Masi, one of the few female detectives in Bengali literature. The first novel with Mitin Masi was Sarandai Saitan, followed by: Sarporahosya sundarbone, Jhau jhien hotyarorosya, Dussapno bar bar, Sander saheber Puthi and others. Other Mitin Masi novels were written for adults.

Suchitra Bhattacharya died on 12 May 2015, aged 65, due to a cardiac arrest at her home in Dhakuria, Kolkata.

== Awards and accolades ==
Suchitra received many awards, including the Bhuban Mohini Medal from Calcutta University in 2004, the Nanjanagudu Thirumalamba National Award (1996), the Katha Award (1997), the Tarashankar Award (2000), the Dwijendralal Award in 2001 from Kalyani, the Sharat Puroshkar (2002), as well as the Bharat Nirman Award, Sahitya Setu Award and Shailajananda Smriti Puroshkar in 2004 and Dinesh Chandra Smriti Puroskar in 2015. She received the Mati Nandy award in 2012.

== Selected novels ==
- Kachher Manush (Close to Me)
- Dahan (The Burning)
- Ichcher Gaach( The Wish Tree)
- Bhanga Kal (Falling Apart)
- Kacher Dewal (The Wall of Glass)
- Hemonter Pakhi (Bird of Autumn)
- Neel Ghurni (Blue tornado)
- Aleek Shukh (Heavenly bliss)
- Gabhir Ashukh (A Grave Illness)
- Uro Megh (Flying Cloud)
- Chhera Taar (Broken string)
- Alochhaya (Shadows of Light)
- Anyo Basanto (Another Spring)
- Parabas
- Palabar Path Nei (No escape)
- Aami Raikishori
- Rangin Pritibi (Colourful world)
- Jalchhobi (Watermark)
- Mitin Masi book series
- Dashti Upanyas (Ten novels)
- German Ganesh
- Ekaa (Alone)
- Aynamahal (Palace of Mirrors)

== Films Based On Her Books ==
- Dahan (1997)
- Hemanter Pakhi (2001)
- Icche (2011)
- Alik Sukh (2013)
- Ramdhanu (2014)
- Salt Mango Tree (2015)
- Onnyo Basanto (2015)
- Praktan (2016)
- Mitin Mashi (2019)
- Jongole Mitin Mashi (2023)
- Mitin: Ekti Khunir Sandhaney (2025)
