= Aamar Boss =

2025 Indian Bengali workplace drama film

- Theatrical release poster
- Directed by: Nandita Roy; Shiboprosad Mukherjee
- Screenplay by: Nandita Roy
- Dialogues by: Shiboprosad Mukherjee
- Story by: Nandita Roy
- Produced by: Nandita Roy; Shiboprosad Mukherjee
- Starring: Rakhee Gulzar; Shiboprosad Mukherjee; Srabanti Chatterjee
- Cinematography: Indranath Marick
- Edited by: Malay Laha
- Music by: Anupam Roy
- Production company: Windows Production
- Distributed by: Windows Production; Cinepolis
- Release date: 9 May 2025
- Running time: 139 Minutes
- Country: India
- Language: Bengali
- Box office: ₹2.54 crore

Aamar Boss (transl. My Boss) is a 2025 Indian Bengali-language corporate drama film written, produced and directed by Nandita Roy and Shiboprosad Mukherjee under the banner of Windows Production. The film stars Rakhee Gulzar, marking her comeback in Bengali cinema after twenty two years, Shiboprosad Mukherjee and Srabanti Chatterjee in lead roles, with Sauraseni Maitra, Aishwarya Sen, Shruti Das and Gourab Chatterjee in supporting roles.

Inspired by real-life corporate day-care initiatives, the story explores themes of inclusive workplaces, intergenerational care, and transformative leadership. The film was announced in December 2023. Principal photography commenced in January 2024 and wrapped by February 2024. Music of the film is composed by Anupam Roy. The cinematography was done by Indranath Marick while Malay Laha handled the editing.

Aamar Boss theatrically released on 9 May 2025, coinciding with Mother's Day. It was selected for screening under the Panorama Section at the 55th International Film Festival of India and 22nd Chennai International Film Festival. The film opened to positive reviews from the audience and critics alike. It emerged as one of the highest grossing Bengali films of 2025.

== Plot ==
The film follows Animesh, a 40-something owner of a publishing house, who struggles to balance his stressful job and his increasingly strained relationship with his wife, Mousumi. Meanwhile, his mother, Subhra—a retired head nurse recovering from bypass surgery—feels neglected and begins accompanying Animesh to his office. She eventually joins as a part-time proofreader, quickly forming warm connections with the staff.

When Animesh is forced to travel to Mumbai following his father-in-law's death, Subhra implements a unique daycare policy: employees are allowed to bring their elderly parents or in-laws to work. This decision enhances team morale and productivity, but soon raises financial concerns. After an intense confrontation between Subhra and Animesh, other companies recognize the value of the initiative and step in to support it—validating Subhra's leadership and vision.

== Cast ==
- Rakhee Gulzar as Subhra Goswami, Animesh's mother
- Shiboprosad Mukherjee as Animesh Goswami, CEO
- Srabanti Chatterjee as Moushumi Banerjee, Animesh's wife
- Kanchan Mullick as Palliyath Unnikrishnan
- Sauraseni Maitra as Sharbani Banerjee
- Gourab Chatterjee as Barin Bagchi
- Aishwarya Sen as Aparna Dubey
- Shruti Das as Aditi Basu
- Avery Sinha Roy as Payel Adhikary
- Uma Banerjee as Jamini Biswas
- Rajat Ganguly as Barin's father
- Lokenath Dey as Subrata
- Sabitri Chatterjee as Jamini's mother
- Indrasish Roy as Shekhar, Mousumi's colleague in Mumbai
- Biswajit Chakraborty as Kalyan Banerjee, Mousumi's father
- Mithu Chakraborty as Mousumi's mother

=== Special appearances ===
- Joy Goswami
- Pracheta Gupta
- Tilottama Majumdar
- Smaranjit Chakraborty

== Production ==
=== Development ===
Gulzar mentioned in an interview that she liked the script after being narrated for the very first time. She signed the film as the story was relatable to her. She loved the script as the film aptly captures how we are losing connection with our roots and everything has become superficial, technology has taken over relationships and close knitted families have diminished. Nandita Roy said in an interview that she developed the character of Rakhee Gulzar based upon the relationship between Shiboprosad Mukherjee and his mother. The film also marks the acting debut of prominent screenwriters of the Bengali film industry including Tilottama Majumdar, Smaranjit Chakraborty and Pracheta Gupta besides poets like Joy Goswami.

=== Announcement and filming ===
Windows Production announced the film on 4 December 2023. Filming began on 5 January 2024 and was completed by February 2024. The complete filming has been done in Kolkata, while major parts were shot at Sector 5 and in front of the Victoria Memorial. Gulzar did her own makeup and wore her own sarees in the film instead of using purchased costumes. The film marks Rakhee Gulzar's return to Bengali cinema after several years and to the silver screen 22 years after Shubho Mahurat in 2003. In an interview, co-director Nandita Roy described her as a "director’s actor" and praised her intuitive performance style.

== Soundtrack ==
Aamar Boss

Soundtrack album by Anupam Roy
- Released: 2025
- Recorded: 2024
- Genre: Film soundtrack
- Language: Bengali
- Labels: WINDOWS, Times Music Bangla

The soundtrack of the film has been composed as well as written by Anupam Roy.

The first song "Bawshonto Dekeche Amake" was released on 10 March 2025. The second single "Malachandan" was released on 11 April 2025. The third song "Hok Start Up" was dropped on 2 May 2025. The fourth single "Ami Achi" was released on 7 May 2025.

Track listing
No.	Title	Singer(s)	Length
1.	"Bawshonto Dekeche Amake"	Prashmita Paul, Upal Sengupta	4:24
2.	"Malachandan"	Anupam Roy	3:53
3.	"Hok Start Up"	Ash King, Cizzy, Disha	3:50
4.	"Ami Achi"	Shaan	3:57

== Marketing ==
The official poster of the film announcing the final release date of 9 May 2025 was released on 26 March 2025. The teaser of the film was released on 2 April 2025. The trailer was released at an event in Mumbai on 25 April 2025. A special screening of the film was conducted at the GMC Balayogi Auditorium of Granthagar Bhawan for the members of the Rajya Sabha. The premiere of the film was held on 12 May 2025 at the Cinepolis screens of the Acropolis Mall in Kolkata.

== Release ==
The film was initially scheduled to release in June 2024. But it was postponed to December 2024 owing to Shiboprosad Mukherjee's injury from the sets of Bohurupi. After getting postponed again to not hamper their previous release Bohurupi's long run, the film was planned to release in Christmas, but later was scheduled to release on 16 May 2025. Eventually, the date was brought forward and the film was finally released in the theatres on 9 May 2025.

== Reception ==
=== Box office ===
The film opened at est. ₹0.25 crore at the box office with 11 thousand footfalls, marking the second highest opening for a Bengali film in 2025. At the end of three days, its box office collection crossed the 1 crore mark and stood at est. ₹1.10 crore. The movie registered 1 lakh+ footfalls in the first week. It grossed ₹2.51 crore at the end of the first week.

=== Critical reception ===
The film has received positive reviews from critics.

Ranita Goswami of Hindustan Times rated the film 9/10 stars and wrote "A well knitted story along with the screenplay are the background of the film." She praised Gulzar's seasoned acting skills, her chemistry with Shiboprosad, the poetic love story between Srabanti and Shiboprosad as well as the comic timing of Kanchan and Sabetri Chatterjee's cameo. Sushmita Dey of Ei Samay rated the film 4 out of 5 stars and praised the chemistry between Gulzar and Mukherjee, the supporting cast and all the songs of the film. Amit gupta of Indian Community addressed the film as "A Tender Tale of Relationships" and rated 4 out of 5 stars, writing "Rather than relying on dramatic twists, the film uses subtle storytelling and authentic performances to highlight everyday emotions — from guilt and nostalgia to reconciliation and unconditional love."

Subhash Jha of The Statesman rated the film 3.5/5 stars and wrote "Aamar Boss celebrates filial ties with lots of singing, dancing, winking and swirling through a sea of splendorous dreaminess." Poorna Banerjee of The Times of India rated the film 3/5 stars and highlighted "The title Aamar Boss cleverly captures the film’s essence – a role reversal where an ageing mother asserts her independence, not just as a parent, but as a person with purpose. The film aligns well with the Roy-Mukherjee filmography. The storytelling occasionally feels crowded – multiple subplots compete for attention, diluting the impact. Despite its flaws, Aamar Boss resonates." Arpita Roy Chowdhury of News 18 quoted "In today's reel-to-reel days, the production seems to lack the necessary tricks to keep the audience interested until the curtain falls. Rather, Savitri Chatterjee's performance brings a breath of fresh air in a small role."

Sandipta Bhanja of Sangbad Pratidin reviewed the film and opined "Human relations in the office space is the key wealth of the movie. The chemistry between Rakhee Gulzar and Shiboprosad Mukherjee serve as the attractive nucleus of the film." She also praised the whole supporting cast and the songs specially "Malachandan", "Modhur Tomar Sesh Je Naa Pai" and "Bawshonto Dekeche". But she bemoaned the writing of the second half and comparatively pale romance between Shiboprosad and Srabanti. The IWMBuzz critic Shatakshi Ganguly rated the film 4.5 out of 5 stars and wrote "Aamar Boss traces me back to the 2015 film Piku, where we see a father-daughter relationship blooming inward and outward." She also added that the film should be considered as "A love letter to the ones who raised us".

== Accolades ==
Aamar Boss was selected for screening under the Panorama Section at the 55th International Film Festival of India at Goa in November 2024. It also earned a nomination at the IFFI ICFT UNESCO Gandhi Medal. Later, it was also included under the Panorama Section at the 22nd Chennai International Film Festival by the National Film Development Corporation of India in December 2024.
