= Bela Seshe =

2015 Indian Bengali film

Belaseshe
- Film poster of the film depicting 50 days run in the box office
- Directed by: Nandita Roy; Shiboprosad Mukherjee
- Produced by: Windows Production
- Starring: Soumitra Chatterjee; Swatilekha Sengupta; Rituparna Sengupta; Aparajita Auddy; Monami Ghosh; Sohini Sengupta; Shankar Chakraborty; Kharaj Mukherjee; Indrani Dutta; Anindya Chatterjee; Sujoy Prasad
- Cinematography: Gopi Bhagat
- Edited by: Moloy Laha
- Music by: Anupam Roy; Anindya Chattopadhyay
- Production company: Windows Production
- Distributed by: Eros International; Piyali Films
- Release dates: 1 May 2015 (West Bengal); 26 June 2015 (Rest of India)
- Running time: 141 minutes
- Country: India
- Language: Bengali
- Budget: ₹11 million (approx.)

Bela Seshe (transl. At the end of the day; also written as Belaseshe: In The Autumn of my Life) is a 2015 Indian Bengali-language family drama film directed by Nandita Roy and Shiboprosad Mukherjee and presented by Atanu Raychaudhuri. It is produced by Windows Production and distributed by Eros International. Veteran actors Soumitra Chatterjee and Swatilekha Sengupta played the lead roles in this film, who were last seen in Satyajit Ray’s film Ghare Baire, three decades earlier. The film additionally features Rituparna Sengupta, Aparajita Adhya, Monami Ghosh, Indrani Dutta, Sohini Sengupta, Kharaj Mukherjee, Shankar Chakraborty, Anindya Chatterjee, Sujoy Prasad Chatterjee, Barun Chanda and Sohag Sen as pivotal roles.

Bela Seshe is the story of the separation of a couple who are on the verge of celebrating their 50th marriage anniversary. It is a tale of relationships that explores the intricacies of married life, life-long companionship, promises and expectations, and the true meaning of love.

== Plot ==
75 years old Biswanath Majumdar is in the publishing business. His wife, Arati is 66 years old. The couple has been married for 49 years and have been blessed with four children: their eldest son Barin, followed by three daughters, Malasree, Kaberi and Piu, all of them now married to Sharmistha, Bijon, Jyotirmoy and Palash, respectively.

Internally, there's trouble in the siblings' married lives. Sharmistha, a medium-scale cloth merchant, is unhappy with Barin's financial position as his father's assistant in the publishing house and suspects that Barin is conducting extramarital affairs. Malasree, an outspoken modernist, doesn't consider Bijon, an unemployed man who lives off his rich inheritance & a sarod-player by passion, to be smart enough for her, so she gets involved in an extra-marital affair. Jyotirmoy, a gold trader, is unhappy with the constant refusal of Kaberi, a mother of three, to satisfy his sexual urges. Palash, being involved in the Bollywood as a director, has very little time to devote for his assistant-cum-wife Piu.

On the night of Vijayadashami after Durga Puja in their North Kolkata residence, in front of the gathered family, Biswanath Majumdar declares that he has decided to divorce his wife, and their mother, Arati. However hard the children try, they cannot extract any information from their father. Their mother seems unconcerned about the announcement. Biswanath files a divorce case in court. In the court proceddings, Biswanath declares that he wants to divorce Arati because he believes that their married life, having fulfilled its purpose, has been converted into a series of obligatory chores, which he wants to be freed of by starting life afresh. The judge, however, asks them to spend a 15-day vacation together, after which if they want, they can mutually divorce.

Unsatisfied with Biswanath's explanation, Barin and his three brothers-in-law place CCTV cameras in Arati and Biswanath's room to eavesdrop on their conversation along with their spouses in order to discover the real reason behind the divorce. As Biswanath and Arati share their long experiences of living together – their grudges, their disappointments, and their delights – they realize that despite having very little or no emotional connection with each other for prolonged periods due to Biswanath's busy schedule and Arati's involvement in household chores, they continued to care for each other. It's drastically different from their children's actions, who have adapted to the modern lifestyle and are whimsical regarding their marital lives.

As they see their parents, the siblings discover their own follies and the love is rekindled with their spouses. Subsequently, Biswanath convinces Arati to divorce him to make her self-dependent, at which Arati unwillingly agrees and the two separate. However, after four months, Biswanath finds out that Arati has managed to be self-sufficient, but he cannot get rid of his dependence on her & suffers from loneliness, so he returns to Arati. The two reconcile emotionally and the entire family, with renewed love in their respective married lives, happily observes Biswanath and Arati's 50th marriage anniversary.

== Cast ==
- Soumitra Chatterjee as Biswanath Majumdar, the main protagonist of the story
- Swatilekha Sengupta as Aarti Majumdar, Biswanath's wife
- Aparajita Auddy as Kaberi/Buri, Biswanath and Arati's oldest daughter
- Rituparna Sengupta as Malashree/Mili, Biswanath and Arati's second daughter
- Monami Ghosh as Piu, Biswanath and Arati's youngest daughter
- Indrani Dutta as Sarmistha, Biswanath, and Arati's daughter-in-law
- Sohini Sengupta in a guest appearance as neighbor
- Barun Chanda as the judge who presides over the divorce trial
- Sujoy Prasad Chatterjee as Bijon, Malasree's husband
- Arunima Halder as Buri and Jyotirmoy & Kaberi's eldest daughter
- Kharaj Mukherjee as Jyotirmay, Kaberi's husband
- Anindya Chatterjee as Palash, Piu's husband
- Shankar Chakraborty as Barin, Biswanath and Arati's only son
- Pradip Bhattacharya as Gansha- Majumdar's servant at Santiniketan
- Sohag Sen as Nalini Mukherjee, Arati's lawyer in court

== Production ==
=== Development ===
Director duo Nandita Roy and Shiboprosad Mukherjee were inspired to do this film after watching a play called Belaseshe Kolahol, written by Kajal Chakraborty and directed by Sohini Sengupta. Chief Justice Asim Chatterjee, famously known as the Puri Judge, used to solve marital disputes by sending estranged couples to Puri, which served as the main inspiration for the court scene. Eminent advocate Jayanta Narayan Chatterjee edited the script for correct legal terminology.

=== Filming ===
The film was shot both in Kolkata and Santiniketan. The house in Santiniketan, where the film was shot, is now a major tourist attraction and is famously called the Belasesher Bari ("The house of Belaseshe"). The shooting of Belasehse was completed in 17 days with a cast of 21 actors. The entire cast and crew stayed in Santiniketan and completed the shooting within a week. In Kolkata, the film was shot in two different houses, both in South Kolkata. One of them was demolished right after the completion of the shooting, as the house was given up for the reconstruction of an apartment building. The fair, shown in the film, was created within two and a half hours and on a limited budget of Rs 7,500. The whole scene was shot candidly and the actors gave impromptu performances to make the sequence memorable.

== Release and reception ==
The film was released on 1 May 2015 with 94% occupancy in theatres on the day of its release. The film was a runaway hit and had an historical run of 250 days in a single hall and 217 days in multiplexes. No other film has run continuously for 217 days in a multiplex.

Bela Seshe became the longest-running Bengali film in 2015. Nationally, the film was released in 25 centres across the country and enjoyed a theatrical run of more than 50 days. The movie garnered these ratings:

Professional ratings
Review scores
Source	Rating
The Times of India	4/5
Anandabazar Patrika	8/10

- 4.6/5 (Book Myshow)
- 4.5/5 (Radio Mirchi)
- 4.5/5 (PowerFM)
- 8/10 (8FM)
- 4/5 (Ei Samay Sangbadpatra)

=== Off-shore release ===
The film also had an off-shore release in UK, US and Singapore. Bela Seshe is the first film to be released in Bangladesh under the import-export laws of 2012–2015 with nations included in SAFTA.

== Critical reception ==
Shomini Sen of IBNLive reviewed the story, describing it as a "poignant story of togetherness", while Arnab Banerjee of Hindustan Times reviewed that the overall story contained the "intricacies of a marital relationship". Sankhayan Ghosh of The Indian Express wrote that the "unusual story" of the film made it famous.

Bela Seshe has been one of the most critically acclaimed films of all time. Amitabh Bachchan tweeted and wrote in his blog about the film. He even wrote an appreciation letter to Swatilekha Sengupta for her impactful performance in the film.

Director Mahesh Bhatt and actor Madhavan Nair were so moved by the film that they wanted to remake the film; director Umesh Shukla wanted to make the film in Gujarati. Veteran Marathi actors Ramesh Deo and Seema Deo wanted to remake the film in Marathi.

Veteran actors Rishi Kapoor and Neetu Kapoor have also praised the film.

== Music ==
For the first time, composers Anindya Chattopadhyay and Anupam Roy collaborated in this film and the music became massively popular right from the day of its release, topping the charts.

"O Thakur jeona bishorjon" by Upal Sengupta and Prashmita Paul became the most popular song of 2015.

== Marketing ==
The film was associated with many brands. Among them, Priyo Gopal Bishoyee launched Belaseshe Saree, which became very popular. Senco Gold launched Belaseshe Anniversary, which are special collections.

== Achievements ==
- Best Bengali film at the Zee Cine Awards 2016
- Zee Cine Awards, Ebela Ojeyo Somman, 'NABC' awards.
- Included in the post-graduate diploma in the counselling course of the Legal Aid Services, West Bengal.
- Selected at the International Film Festival of South Asia: 2016, Toronto, Canada.

== Spin-off ==
The commercial success of the film has paved the way for a spin-off titled Bela Shuru. The release of the film was postponed due to the prevailing pandemic situation and the closure of cinema halls in the country. Soumitra Chatterjee died on 15 November 2020 due to COVID-19. Swatilekha Sengupta died on 16 June 2021 due to kidney-related ailments. Bela Shuru was released on 20 May 2022.
