= Mitin Mashi =

2019 Bengali detective film

- Theatrical release poster
- Directed by: Arindam Sil
- Screenplay by: Padmanabha Dasgupta; Arindam Sil
- Based on: Hate Matro Tintey Din by Suchitra Bhattacharya
- Produced by: Rupa Datta
- Starring: Koel Mallick; Vinay Pathak; June Malia; Subhrajit Dutta
- Cinematography: Subhankar Bhar
- Edited by: Sanglap Bhowmik
- Music by: Bickram Ghosh
- Production company: Camellia Productions
- Release date: 2 October 2019
- Running time: 1 Hour 52 Minutes
- Country: India
- Language: Bengali

Mitin Mashi is a 2019 Indian Bengali detective action thriller film directed by Arindam Sil, produced by Rupa Datta and presented by Camellia Production Pvt. Ltd. The film starring Koel Mallick and Vinay Pathak, is based on the Haatey Matro Tintey Din, a story by the novelist Suchitra Bhattacharya. Mallick portrays the fictional detective character, Mitin Masi, created by Bhattacharya. The film was released on 2 October 2019.

== Plot ==
Rounak Jariwala, the son of a rich Parsi businessman Rustam Jariwala, gets kidnapped from his school. Rustam approaches Detective Pragyaparamita Mukherjee aka Mitin Masi to rescue his son, having only 3 days time in hand. Mitin investigates and solves the case, along with her niece Tupur and husband Partha. The culprits ultimately get caught and the child is safely returned to his parents.

== Cast ==
- Koel Mallick as Pragyaparamita Mukherjee aka Mitin Masi
- Vinay Pathak as Rustam Jariwala
- June Malia as Lila Jariwala
- Riya Banik as Oindrilla aka Tupur, Mitin's niece and sidekick
- Subhrajit Dutta as Partha, Mitin's husband
- Anirban Chakrabarti as Police Officer Anishchay
- Arindam Sil as Totla Shyamol
- Koyel Das

== Release ==
The first look poster of the movie was revealed on 28 May 2019. The official teaser was released by Camellia Films Production on 1 September 2019. The official trailer was released by Camellia Films Production ten days later on 10 September 2019. The film was released on 2 October 2019.

== Soundtrack ==
Mitin Mashi

Soundtrack album by Bickram Ghosh
- Released: 18 September 2019
- Studio: Bickram Ghosh Studios
- Genre: Feature film soundtrack
- Label: CamelliaFilms Production

Bickram Ghosh chronology
Eagoler Chokh (2016)	Mitin Mashi (2019)

The soundtrack is composed by Bickram Ghosh and lyrics by Rajiv Pandey and Sugato Guha.

Track listing
No.	Title	Lyrics	Singer(s)	Length
1.	"Barsat Sawan"	Rajiv Pandey	Ustad Rashid Khan	5:55
2.	"Baat Chalat"	Sugato Guha	Madhubanti Bagchi	4:34
Total length:				10:30

== Sequel ==
- Jongole Mitin Mashi, another film directed by Arindam Sil was released on 18 October 2023. The film was based on Saranday Shoytan, a novel of Suchitra Bhattacharya.
- Ekti Khunir Sandhane Mitin third part of this franchise starring Koel Mallik will be released in December 2025.
