= Haami 2 =

2022 Indian Bengali film

- Theatrical release poster
- Directed by: Nandita Roy; Shiboprosad Mukherjee
- Written by: Nandita Roy
- Screenplay by: Nandita Roy
- Dialogues: Shiboprosad Mukherjee
- Story by: Nandita Roy
- Produced by: Shiboprosad Mukherjee
- Cinematography: Aalok Maiti
- Edited by: Moloy Laha
- Music by: Anindya Chatterjee
- Production company: Windows Production
- Release date: 23 December 2022
- Running time: 140 minutes
- Country: India
- Language: Bengali

Haami 2 is a 2022 Indian Bengali-language comedy film directed by Nandita Roy and Shiboprosad Mukherjee. The film is produced by Windows and is distributed regionally by the same. It is a sequel to Haami (2018), which also addressed the issues of modern-day parenting. The film has a child actors cast.

== Premise ==
An 8-year-old math prodigy is sent by his parents to participate in a reality show where he will compete with other children.

== Cast ==
- Shiboprosad Mukherjee as Laltu Mondal
- Gargee RoyChowdhury as Mitali Mondal
- Ritodeep Sengupta as Bhepu (Sidhartha Mondal)
- Shreyan Saha as Chinu (Sugata Mondal)
- Aritrika Chowdhury as Ruksana Ali Mirza
- Anjan Dutt as Nitai jetha
- Prosenjit Chatterjee as himself
- Kharaj Mukherjee as Prashanta Chakraborty
- Sidhartha Mukherjee as Ruksana's father
- Papri Ghosh as Ruksana's mother
- Haranath Chakraborty as Haranath Chakraborty
- Somak Ghosh as himself
- Monami Ghosh as herself
- Tanusree Chakraborty as herself
- Shahir Raj as AD

== Reception ==
The Telegraph gave the film a positive review praising the actors' performances. The Times of India finds that "Haami 2 happens to be a lot more watchable than Haami; it has better screenwriting, and better lines, the slapstick has been reined in and it’s not as preachy."
