= Mitin Masi =

- First appearance: Pālābāra Patha Nē'i
- Last appearance: Syānḍārsa Sāhēbēra Punthi
- Created by: Suchitra Bhattacharya
- Portrayed by: Koel Mallick

In-universe information
- Full name: Pragyaparamita Mukherjee
- Gender: Female
- Occupation: Detective
- Spouse: Parthapratim Mukherjee
- Children: Bumbum
- Relatives: Saheli (sister), Aboni (brother-in-law), Tupur (niece)
- Religion: Hinduism
- Nationality: Indian
- dwelling: Dhakuria, Kolkata

Mitin Masi is a fictional Bengali female detective character created by Suchitra Bhattacharya. She is one of the most famous female detective character and most read in Bengali novels.

== Character ==
Suchitra Bhattacharya created detective fictions about Mitin mainly for teenagers, but also wrote some Mitin stories for adults. The real name of Mitin Masi is Pragyaparamita Mukherjee. She is in her mid 30s and likes to cook. She lives in Dhakuria, Kolkata with her husband named Partha and son, Bumbum. She also works as a private detective, who is described to use her mind rather than her revolver. She has a detective agency called the Third Eye. Oindrilla, popularly known as Tupur, is her niece. Tupur is a school student who assists her in many of her cases. Suchitra Bhattacharya writes many of the stories with a background of travelling to different places in India. Along with her mysteries, she also inculcates some knowledge of the culture of the specific setting in her stories. Other characters in her story includes, Mitin's sister Saheli, her husband Aboni, and Tupur’s parents.

== Stories ==
Most of the stories of Mitin Masi were published in Pujabarshiki Anandamela, which include:

- Saranday Shoytan - The gang go to Saranda, in Jharkhand for a vacation and get entangled in a poaching case.
- Jonathaner Barir Vut - Mysterious supernatural occurrings at an elderly Christian man, Jonathan's house causes Mitin to jump on the case with full vigour.
- Keralay Kistimaat - The gang's vacation to Kerala takes an exciting spin when a centuries—old scroll goes missing right in front of them.
- Sarpa Rahasya Sundarbone - The mysterious disappearance of a scientist working on a cure for cancer sends Mitin and Tupur diving into adventure.
- Jhao Jhiyen Hatya Rahasya - Tupur's Chinese friend thinks his uncle's death had some foul play; it's up to Mitin to uncover the truth.
- Chhokta Sudoku'r - When Partha wins a free trip to Singapore, the gang are over the moon. But there is a dark secret behind the glamorous invitation.
- Arakiyeler Hire - A diamond of Arakiyel family goes missing after the death of the family patriarch. Mitin and Tupur goes to investigate.
- Guptadhaner Gujab - An age—old house on the banks of the Ganges creates suspicion about a hidden treasure. But is it really treasure or some other form of mystery?
- Hate Matro Tinte Din - The only child of a rich Parsi businessman goes missing. Mitin comes to the scene to solve the mystery within 72 hours.
- Kuriye Paowa Pendrive - A family trip to Himachal Pradesh turns into an adventure when Mitin learns about the theft of famous paintings.
- Marquis Street-e Mirtyufand - A so–called natural death of some Jewish men and women creates a nuisance. Are those deaths really natural or is there some foul play?
- Tikorparay Gharial - A peaceful vacation turns into a hair-raising escapade after the disappearance of two gharials (a breed of crocodile) from a sanctuary.
- Duswapno Barbar - A story of Tupur's classmate Shalini who is plagued with recurring nightmares. Can Mitin find out the reason behind these nightmares?
- Sanders Saheber pnuthi - Mitin and gang went to Zanskar and Ladakh in search of Debal and a rare buddhist manuscript.

Apart from these, Suchitra Bhattacharya also wrote six adult detective stories of Mitin Masi namely:

- Ekta Shudhu Wrong Number
- Bish
- Trishna Mara Geche
- Maron Batash
- Megher Pore Megh
- Palabar Path Nei

== Film ==
- Arindam Sil completed the first Mitin Mashi film based on the story Haatey Matro Tintey Din. Mitin was played by Bengali actress Koel Mallick. The film Mitin Mashi was released during 2019 Durga Puja.
- Jongole Mitin Mashi, another film directed by Arindam Sil was released on 18 October 2023. The film was based on Saranday Shoytan, a novel of Suchitra Bhattacharya.
- Ekti Khunir Sandhane Mitin, third part of this franchise is scheduled to be released on 25 December 2025. This film is based on Megher Pore Megh, story of Suchitra Bhattacharya.
