= Hemanter Pakhi =

2002 Indian Bengali film

- Directed by: Urmi Chakraborty
- Written by: Suchitra Bhattacharya
- Produced by: NFDC
- Starring: Tanushree Shankar; Parambrata Chatterjee; Mamata Shankar; Swastika Mukherjee; Soumitra Chatterjee; Santu Mukhopadhyay
- Cinematography: Asim Bose
- Edited by: Arghakamal Mitra
- Music by: Debojyoti Mishra
- Release date: 25 April 2002
- Running time: 113 minutes
- Country: India
- Language: Bengali

Hemanter Pakhi (transl. Autumn Bird) is an Indian Bengali feature film directed by Urmi Chakraborty.

== Plot ==
A Bengali housewife takes up a writing career after 23 years of marriage. She is introduced to a new world and new friends. Her work gets appreciated, and this in turn brings a new twist in her life. She starts discovering her husband and her beloved children in a new light. This creates trouble in her family, and she sacrifices her dream for the sake of her family.

== Cast ==
- Tanushree Shankar
- Parambrata Chatterjee
- Soumitra Chatterjee
- Santu Mukhopadhyay
- Swastika Mukherjee
- Mamata Shankar
- Biswajit Chakraborty
- Bodhisattwa Majumdar
- Soma Chakraborty
- Koushik Bhattacharya

== Awards ==
- National Film Award for Best Feature Film in Bengali (2002)
