= Dharmajuddha =

2020 film by Raj Chakraborty

- Directed by: Raj Chakraborty
- Written by: Raj Chakraborty
- Screenplay by: Padmanabha Dasgupta
- Story by: Raj Chakraborty; Padmanabha Dasgupta
- Produced by: Raj Chakraborty; Shyam Agarwal
- Starring: Subhashree Ganguly; Parno Mittra; Ritwick Chakraborty; Soham Chakraborty; Swatilekha Sengupta
- Cinematography: Soumik Haldar
- Edited by: Sanglap Bhowmick
- Music by: Indraadip Dasgupta
- Production company: Raj Chakraborty Entertainment
- Distributed by: Raj Chakraborty Entertainment
- Release date: 11 August 2022
- Running time: 111 minutes
- Country: India
- Language: Bengali

Dharmajuddha (transl. Crusade) is a 2022 Indian Bengali-language political drama film co-written and directed by Raj Chakraborty. The film is jointly produced by Raj Chakraborty and Shyam Agarwal under their banners of Raj Chakraborty Entertainment and Srijan Arts respectively. The film is set at the backdrop of a communal riot between Hindus and Muslims. The film stars Swatilekha Sengupta, Ritwick Chakraborty, Subhashree Ganguly, Soham Chakraborty and Parno Mittra in lead roles. This film was OTT released 19 July 2024 on hoichoi.

== Plot ==
The plot revolves around a sudden outbreak of communal riots in the small town of Ismailpur. Four persons, communal rivals to each other, namely Munni, Raghav, Shabnam and Jabbar, take shelter at an old woman's house. Each one of them has a heart-wrenching backstory connected with the riots. Though initially hostile, they eventually feel sympathy for each other and realise their pains are not different. Through a series of events occurring that night, they understand the utter futility of these riots and that the ultimate loser in these riots is the poor common man.

== Cast ==
- Subhashree Ganguly as Munni
- Parno Mittra as Shabnam
- Ritwick Chakraborty as Raghav
- Soham Chakraborty as Jabbar
- Swatilekha Sengupta as Ammi
- Koushik Roy as Narayan, Shabnam's lover
- Saptarshi Maulik as Ratan, Munni's husband

== Release ==
The teaser of the film was released on 6 December 2019. The trailer of the film was unveiled on 14 February 2020. The film was released theatrically after numerous delays and postponements due to COVID 19 pandemic on 11 August 2022.

== Soundtrack ==
Dharmajuddha

Soundtrack album by Indraadip Dasgupta
- Released: 2020
- Genre: Film soundtrack
- Language: Bengali
- Label: Raj Chakraborty Entertainment
External videos
- "Tumi Jodi Chao" on YouTube
- "Tujh Sang Bandhi Dor" on YouTube
- "Maa" on YouTube

Singles from Dharmajuddha
- 1. "Tumi Jodi Chao" Released: 18 January 2020; 2. "Tujh Sang Bandhi Dor" Released: 1 February 2020; 3. "Maa" Released: 7 August 2022

All the songs are composed by Indraadip Dasgupta. All the lyrics are penned by Ritam Sen.

Track listing
No.	Title	Singer(s)	Length
1.	"Tumi Jodi Chao"	Shreya Ghoshal, Dev Arijit	3:10
2.	"Tujh Sang Bandhi Dor"	Dev Arijit	4:20
3.	"Maa"	Soumyojit Das	4:50
