= Belashuru =

2022 Indian Bengali-language film

- Teaser poster
- Directed by: Nandita Roy; Shiboprosad Mukherjee
- Produced by: Nandita Roy; Shiboprosad Mukherjee
- Starring: Soumitra Chatterjee; Swatilekha Sengupta; Rituparna Sengupta; Aparajita Auddy; Indrani Dutta; Kharaj Mukherjee; Anindya Chatterjee; Sankar Chakraborty
- Cinematography: Subhankar Bhar
- Edited by: Moloy Laha
- Music by: Anupam Roy; Anindya Chatterjee
- Production company: Windows Production
- Release date: 20 May 2022
- Running time: 140 minutes
- Country: India
- Language: Bengali
- Box office: ₹4.38 crore

Belashuru (transl. Start of the day) is a 2022 Bengali-language family drama film directed and produced by Nandita Roy and Shiboprosad Mukherjee. According to the directors, this is not a prequel or sequel to their previous film Bela Seshe. Original photography of the film began on 30 November 2018 in Bolpur.

The film was released on 20 May 2022 after the deaths of its lead actors, Soumitra Chatterjee (died on 15 November 2020) & Swatilekha Sengupta (died on 16 June 2021) due to COVID-19 pandemic in India. Grossing over ₹4.38 crore, it became a box-office success and emerged as one of the highest grossing Bengali films of 2022.

== Plot ==
The story takes place 5 years after the events of Belaseshe. Arati has been diagnosed with Alzheimer's disease. She fails to recognise her husband Biswanath, and has forgotten everything about her marital life except her 3 daughters - Malasree, Kaberi and Piu, and her son Barin. She recognises Bijon (Malasree's husband) and Sharmistha (Barin's wife), and remembers the existence of Jyotirmay (Kaberi's husband) and Palash (Piu's husband), but is unable to recognise them. Because of Arati's decreased tolerance to noise, Biswanath moves her from Kolkata to Santiniketan. In spite of his own advanced age, Biswanath single-handedly takes care of Arati, refusing to hand over her responsibility to their children or to any nurse. Biswanath states that he wants to take care of Arati alone without anyone's help as penitence for his inability to devote time for her during their married life. In spite of his efforts, Arati is completely unable to recognise Biswanath as her husband (who, she believes, has abandoned her), and regards him with contempt for violating her privacy. She often sneaks out of the house & roams around the village in her quest to return to her native village in Faridpur (Note: In Belaseshe, it was stated that Biswanath hails from Mymensingh, and Arati is from Faridpur and they had to migrate from East Bengal to escape religious persecution) and meet her childhood friend Atindra. In an attempt to help Arati regain her memory, Biswanath decides to take Arati to her native village. They are accompanied by Malasree, Bijon, Piu, Palash, and Jyotirmay. At Faridpur, they meet Atindra and try to reconnect Arati with her childhood memories. Arati becomes visibly happier and starts to recall the day of her marriage. She recalls her husband's name, but still fails to recognise him. In a last attempt to help Arati recollect her memories about Biswanath, her family recreates the day of her marriage, complete with all the necessary customs, which she gladly recognises. Although Arati's contempt for Biswanath had gone after the re-enactment of her marriage, she is still unable to recognise him as her husband. Biswanath finally gives up all hopes of Arati ever recognising him as her husband, but continues to take care of her.

Parallel to Biswanath & Arati's story, the film shows the story of their children & their spouses. Barin (who was his father's assistant in his publishing house in Belaseshe) is now a successful businessman who runs his own publishing house in Kolkata. He had been apprehensive about Sharmistha (who was portrayed as a middle-scale cloth merchant) outshining him professionally. This has now culminated in Sharmistha divorcing Barin. Sharmistha has shifted to Mumbai with her son & daughter, where she runs a large boutique frequented by big names of Bollywood, and is considering marrying her colleague Kunal Bharadwaj. Arati doesn't remember Barin's divorce, and keeps asking him about Sharmistha. In an attempt to help Arati recover her memories, Barin personally requests Sharmistha to visit Arati. Sharmistha initially declines but later she visits Barin & his family at Shantiniketan after they had returned from Faridpur. Here, Barin apologies to Sharmistha for not allowing her to work freely during their married life & accepts her to be more talented than him. As a result, love is rekindled between them & Sharmistha refuses to go back to Mumbai.

Bijon & Malasree haven't produced children in spite of being apparently happily married for many years. Malasree is pressured by her family to consult a doctor, but refuses. Later she reveals to Biswanath that Bijon is gay, was forced by his family to marry her for the sake of appearance. Biswanath urges Malasree to divorce Bijon, but she retorts that Biswanath himself has proved by his dedication to the now intellectually-disabled Arati that married life isn't centred exclusively around children. She states that both she & Bijon had tried to end the marriage by indulging in extra-marital affairs but failed to do so because they found solace in each other's companionship. Malasree believes that their friendship transcends physical desire, and Bijon would prove to be as faithful and devoted as Biswanath if she ever became like Arati. (Note: In Belaseshe, Malasree did not at first consider Bijon, an unemployed man but rich heir & esraj-player by passion to be smart enough for her. But she pulled out of her affair when she realised that that Bijon was aware of her dalliances but didn't stop her because he believed that no one could take care of her as well as he could)

Palash has abandoned his position as a director in Bollywood, and works as a TV actor in Mumbai. Piu, too, left the film industry to work as a designer, but then stopped working because she wants to bear children and enjoy motherhood. However, their attempts in this regard have not yet borne fruit, and Palash has become too busy with his work to devote time to Piu. Piu was becoming frustrated with her married life, but when she finds Biswanath regretful for not having spent enough time with Arati, she decides not to repeat the same mistake with Palash. It turns out that Palash is stressed by severe competition among small actors to remain relevant in the television industry, and is suffering from oligospermia. He is initially reluctant to accompany Piu to Shantiniketan, but is eventually persuaded by Arati's repeated insistence to see him. At Shantiniketan he is able to reconnect with Piu. On the eve of the family's departure for Faridpur, Palash takes the monumental decision to pull out of the television industry and spend more time with his wife. On the day when Arati's marriage to Biswanath is re-enacted by her family, Piu reveals to Palash that she is finally pregnant with his child.

== Cast ==
- Soumitra Chatterjee as Biswanath Sarkar
- Swatilekha Sengupta as Arati Sarkar
- Rudraprasad Sengupta as Atindra
- Aparajita Auddy as Kaberi/Buri, Biswanath and Arati's eldest daughter
- Kharaj Mukherjee as Jyotirmay, Kaberi's husband
- Rituparna Sengupta as Malashree/Mili, Biswanath and Arati's second daughter
- Shankar Chakraborty as Barin, Biswanath and Arati's only son
- Indrani Dutta as Sarmistha, Biswanath and Arati's daughter-in-law
- Sujoy Prasad Chatterjee as Bijon, Malasree's husband
- Arunima Halder as Jyotirmoy & Kaberi's eldest daughter
- Tanika Basu as Barin & Sarmistha's daughter
- Sohini Banerjee as Jyotirmoy & Kaberi's second daughter
- Debosmita Bonik as Buri and Jyotirmay's daughter
- Monami Ghosh as Piu, Biswanath and Arati's youngest daughter
- Rupsha Bhaduri as Buri and Jyotirmoy's daughter
- Anindya Chatterjee as Palash, Piu's husband
- Pradip Bhattacharya as Gansha- Sarkar's servant at Santiniketan
- Sayak Chakraborty as Arka, fiancé of Jyotirmoy's eldest daughter
- Kaushik Sen as Dr. Biplab Banerjee, the geriatric psychiatrist who treats Arati

== Soundtrack ==
Belashuru

Soundtrack album by Anupam Roy and Anindya Chattopadhyay
- Released: 2022
- Genre: Film soundtrack
- Length: 21:02
- Language: Bengali
- Label: Times Music Bangla

The soundtrack album of the film has been composed by Anupam Roy and Anindya Chattopadhyay. The lyrics have also been penned by them in the songs which they have composed, respectively.

Track listing
No.	Title	Singer(s)	Length
1.	"Shohage Adore"	Anupam Roy	5:33
2.	"Tapa Tini"	Iman Chakraborty, Ananya Khnada Bhattacharjee, Upali Chatterjee	4:15
3.	"Belashuru (Title Track)"	Kabir Suman	2:58
4.	"Ki Mayay"	Shreya Ghoshal	3:45
5.	"Bhalobashar Bhitte"	Anindya Chattopadhyay, Prashmita Paul, Prabuddha Banerjee	4:31
Total length:			21:02

== Reception ==
=== Box office ===
The film earned ₹35 lakh on the first day. Till 12 June, the film earned total ₹1.41 crore. At the end of its theatrical run, the film collected over ₹4.38 crore and emerged as a box-office success.

=== Critical reception ===
Rituparna Roy of India Today criticised the near-idealistic storyline & lack of depth in the portrayal of dementia patients in the film & stated that Sraboner Dhara (another film which starred Soumitra Chatterjee) was far better in depicting challenges faced while handling patients of Alzheimer's. Tilottama Majumdar of Anandabazar Patrika reviews, 'The success of the name 'Belashuru' lies in the fact that the movie gives this important message - there exists no pre-determined time to realise the dimensions of a relationship.'

Jaya Bishwas of The Times of India reviews, "Belashuru talks about our frustrations and regrets — the pain we inflict on each other unknowingly at times. But then, it is our love that ultimately helps us heal, find redemption in our relationships. We see Biswanath regretting the fact that he could not be there for his wife for most of their lives. And now, when he really wants to spend some quality time with her, Arati can’t recognise him anymore. It becomes all the more important for him to take care of her. The story may not be exceptional. The editing could have been tighter. But you will forget these niggles, as the emotional quotient sweeps you away."
