= Swatilekha Sengupta =

Bengali actress (1950–2021)

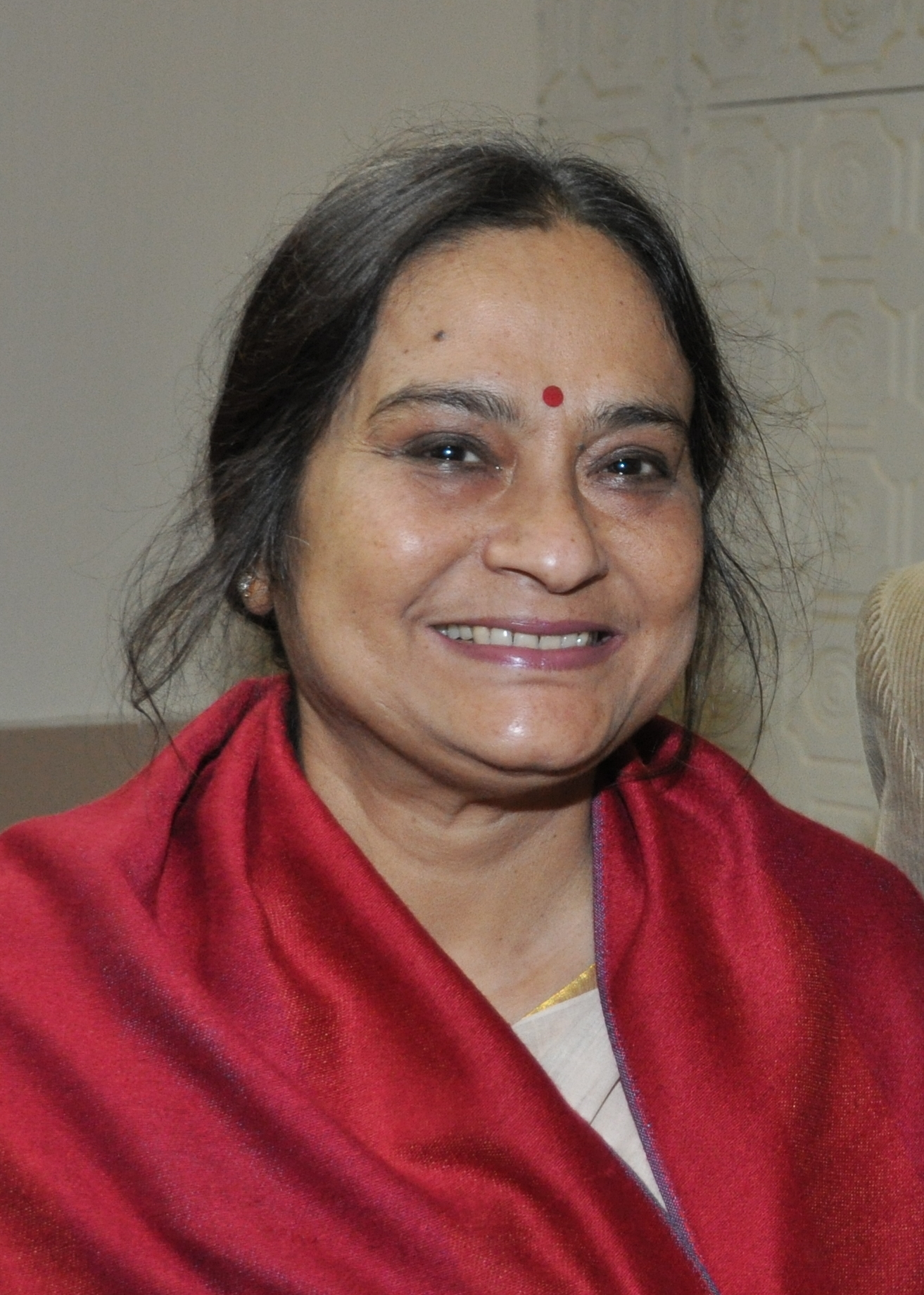
- Sengupta in January 2010
- Born: Swatilekha Chatterjee; 22 May 1950; Prayagraj, Uttar Pradesh, India
- Died: 16 June 2021 (aged 71); Kolkata, West Bengal, India
- Education: Allahabad University
- Occupation: Theatre personality
- Spouse: Rudraprasad Sengupta
- Children: Sohini Sengupta

Swatilekha Sengupta (née Chatterjee; 22 May 1950 – 16 June 2021) was a Bengali actress. She had received the Sangeet Natak Akademi Award for her contribution to Indian theatre as an actor.

== Career ==
Swatilekha started her career in theater in Prayagraj in the early 1970s, acting in productions under the direction of A.C. Banerjee. She also received guidance from B.V. Karanth, Tapas Sen, and Khaled Chowdhury. Then she moved to Kolkata and joined the theater group Nandikar in 1978. In Nandikar she worked under the direction of Rudraprasad Sengupta, whom she went on to marry.

She was also the lead female protagonist in Ghare Baire, a 1984 film by Satyajit Ray, against Victor Banerjee and Soumitra Chatterjee. This film was based upon a novel of the same name Ghare Baire written by the famous Bengali writer Rabindranath Tagore. She has also acted in films like Chauranga, Bela Seshe, Dharmajuddha and Bela Shuru.

== Death ==
Sengupta died on 16 June 2021 from complications arising from kidney ailments. She was 71 at the time of her death. Her last work was Belashuru.

== Filmography ==
Year	Film	Role	Director
2021	Dharmajuddha	Ammi	Raj Chakraborty
2021	Belashuru	Arati Sarkar	Nandita Roy, Shiboprosad Mukherjee
2019	Barof	Subham's Mother	Sudip Chakraborty
2015	Bela Seshe	Arati Majumdar	Nandita Roy, Shiboprosad Mukherjee
1984	Ghare Baire	Bimala	Satyajit Ray

== Awards ==
- 2011 – Sangeet Natak Akademi Award for her contribution to Indian theatre as an actor.
- West Bengal Film Journalists' Association Awards.
- Paschim Banga Natya Akademi award.
