= Maati (film) =

- Theatrical release poster
- Directed by: Saibal Banerjee; Leena Gangopadhyay
- Produced by: Magic Moments Motion Pictures
- Starring: Adil Hussain; Paoli Dam; Shankar Chakraborty; Laboni Sarkar; Chandan Sen; Aparajita Auddy; Monami Ghosh; Anusuya Majumdar
- Cinematography: Sirsha Ray
- Edited by: Subhajit Singha
- Music by: Debajyoti Mishra
- Release date: 13 July 2018
- Country: India
- Language: Bengali

Maati is a 2018 Indian Bengali-language drama film directed by Saibal Banerjee and Leena Gangopadhyay and starring Paoli Dam & Adil Hussain in the lead roles.

== Synopsis ==
Meghla finds out her grandmother had been killed in her ancestral home in East Pakistan by a trusted retainer of the family. Many years after the tragedy, Meghla goes back to Kutubdia to trace her roots and faces the murderer's family who now occupies her house. 'Maati' traces Meghla's trials with truth and humanity, while tackling issues of migration, human displacement and relationships.

== Cast ==
- Paoli Dam as Meghla Chowdhury
- Adil Hussain as Jamil Bhai
- Sabitri Chatterjee as Amina, Jamil's mother
- Shankar Chakroborty as Meghla's father
- Laboni Sarkar as Meghla's mother
- Chandan Sen as Satyabrata Chowdhury, Meghla's grandfather
- Aparajita Adhya as Kumudini Devi, Meghla's grandmother
- Koushik Roy as Jigir Ali
- Monami Ghosh as Jiniya
- Anusuya Majumdar as Dadi, Jiniya's grandmother
- Rishi Koushik as Angshu, Meghla's boyfriend
- Bharat Kaul as Celina's father
- Sagarika Roy as Bina
- Goutam De as Jiniya's father
- Maya Ghosh as Jiniya's mother
- Suman Banerjee as Asif, Jiniya's husband
- Diganta Bagchi as Ranjit's father
- Rupsha Bhaduri as Celina
- Aniruddha Ghosh as Ranjit
- Manjushree Ganguly as Jamil's sister
- Debolina Mukherjee as Jiniya's friend
- Prapti Chatterjee as Jiniya"s friend
- Debjani Chakraborty as Jiniya's friend
- Sonal Mishra as Jiniya's friend

== Music ==
Maati

Soundtrack album by Debajyoti Mishra
- Recorded: 2018–2019
- Genre: Feature film soundtrack
- Length: 21:24
- Language: Bengali
- Label: Zee Music Bangla
External audio
- Audio Jukebox on YouTube

The music and the background score is by Debojyoti Mishra. The film comprises 7 tracks and the lyrics are written by Debojyoti Mishra, Anirban Mukhpadhyay, Rabindranath Tagore and Hason Raja. The album rights of the film were acquired by Zee Music Bangla.

Track listing
No.	Title	Lyrics	Music	Singer(s)	Length
1.	"Piriti Baindheche Holdi"	Debojyoti Mishra	Debojyoti Mishra	Rageshri Das	3:00
2.	"Mehendi Song (Haat Duhani)"	Debojyoti Mishra	Debojyoti Mishra	Trisha Parui, Titas Bhattacharyya, Debarati Sarkar, Sneha Bandyopadhyay, Ayantika Koley, Mouli Bhattacharya and Hrittika Sarkar	3:01
3.	"Monasha Bhasan Song (Lokhai)"	Debojyoti Mishra	Debojyoti Mishra	Titas Bhattacharyya, Debarati Sarkar, Sneha Bandyopadhyay, Ayantika Koley, Mouli Bhattacharya and Hrittika Sarkar	2:42
4.	"Nojor Nojor"	Debojyoti Mishra, Anirban Mukhpadhyay	Debojyoti Mishra	Rageshri Das, Titas Bhattacharyya, Debarati Sarkar, Sneha Bandyopadhyay, Ayantika Koley, Hrittika Sarkar and Mouli Bhattacharya	3:22
5.	"Probhat Feri Song"	Debojyoti Mishra, Anirban Mukhpadhyay	Debojyoti Mishra	Subhankar Panda, Rudraneel Chowdhury, Arnab Basu, Arindam Sahana, Titas Bhattacharyya, Debarati Sarkar, Sneha Bandyopadhyay, Ayantika Koley, Mouli Bhattacharya, Hrittika Sarkar, Sudipta Pradhan and Sayan Bhattacharya	2:58
6.	"O Aamar Desher Maati"	Rabindranath Tagore	Rabindranath Tagore	Choir Of Sraboni Sen Academy	4:02
7.	"Nisha Lagilo Re"	Hason Raja	Hason Raja	Shantanu Ghosh and Choir	3:18
Total length:					21:24
