= Aparajita Auddy =

Bengali Actress

Aparajita Adhya
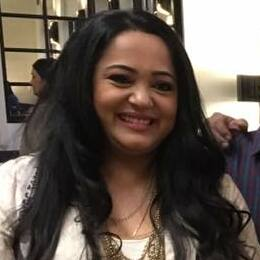
- Aparajita Adhya
- Born: 22 February 1978 (age 48); Kolkata, India
- Occupation: Actress
- Years active: 1997–present
- Known for: Jol Nupur, Bela Seshe, Praktan
- Spouse: Atanu Hazra (m. 1997)
- Parents: Bijon Kumar Adhya (father); Tripti Adhya (mother)

Aparajita Adhya (born c. 1978) is an Indian actress who works primarily in the Bengali film and television industry. She achieved popularity after starring in the film Praktan.

She has been an actress for many years. In 1997 she met her husband, Atanu Hazra, who was assisting at a shoot. They married despite her family's disapproval.

She has been nominated for an acting award and she stars in the TV show Lokkhi Kakima Superstar. She is a Vice President of the "West Bengal Motion Picture Artists' Forum" along with fellow actors Sabyasachi Chakrabarty, Kaushik Sen, Bharat Kaul and Sumanta Mukherjee.

== Filmography ==
Year	Film	Director
2025	Bansara	Atiul islam
2024	Eta Amader Golpo	Manasi Sinha
2024	5 No Swapnamay Lane	Manasi Sinha
2023	Bogla Mama Jug Jug Jiyo	Dhrubo Banerjee
2023	Mon Kharap	Pavel
2023	Cheeni 2	Mainak Bhaumik
2023	Love Marriage	Premendu Bikash Chaki
2023	Dilkhush	Rahool Mukherjee
2022	Kothamrito	Jiit Chakraborty
2022	Kolkata Chalantika	Pavel
2022	Bismillah	Indraadip Dasgupta
2022	Belashuru	Nandita Roy & Shiboprosad Mukherjee
2021	Ekannoborti	Mainak Bhaumik
2020	Cheeni	Mainak Bhaumik
2019	Ke Tumi Nandini	Pathikrit Basu
2019	Mukherjee Dar Bou	Pritha Chakraborty
2018	Rosogolla	Pavel
2018	Haami	Nandita Roy and Shiboprosad Mukherjee
2018	Dhanbad Blues	Hoichoi Originals
2018	Generation Ami	Mainak Bhaumik
2018	Kishore Kumar Junior	Kaushik Ganguly
2018	Oskar	Partha Sarathi Manna
2018	Maati	Leena Gangopadhyay & Saibal Banerjee
2018	Noor Jahaan	Abhimanyu Mukherjee
2017	Projapoti Biskut	Anindya Chatterjee
2017	Samantaral	Partha Chakraborty
2017	Nabab	Joydeep Mukherjee
2017	Meri Pyaari Bindu	Akshay Roy
2016	Praktan	Nandita Roy &Shiboprosad Mukherjee
2015	Bela Seshe	Nandita Roy &Shiboprosad Mukherjee
2015	Open Tee Bioscope	Anindya Chatterjee
2013	Goynar Baksho	Aparna Sen
2012	Chupkatha	Souvick Sarkar, Dipankar
2012	Chitrangada: The Crowning Wish	Rituparno Ghosh
2012	Laptop	Kaushik Ganguly
2009	Madly Bangalee	Anjan Dutt
2008	Bajimaat	Haranath Chakraborty
2004	Mahulbanir Sereng	Sekhar Das
2003	Ke Apon Ke Par	Bappa Banerjee
2003	Shubho Mahurat	Rituparno Ghosh
2001	Ebong Tumi Aar Ami	Goutam Basu
1998	Shimul Parul	Swapan Saha
1997	Moner Manush	Swapan Saha

== Television ==
Year	Serial	Channel	Character
1999–2005	Ek Akasher Niche	Zee Bangla	Minu
1999	Beauty Parlour	Zee Bangla	
1999	Iskaboner Bibi	Zee Bangla	
1999	Priyotama	Zee Bangla	
2002	Neel Seemana	Zee Bangla	
2003	Taka Na Sona	Tara TV	Host
2003	Tamasa Rekha	Zee Bangla	Supporting role
2003	Shudhu Tomari Jonyo	ETV Bangla	Episodic role
2005	Bishprantar	Zee Bangla	Lead role
2008–2010	Kurukshetra	Akash Aath	Ananya / Anu (lead role)
2010–2011	Gaaner Oparey	Star Jalsha	Rani
2011–2012	Adwitiya	Star Jalsha	Monimala / Monima
2011–2012	Kanakanjali	Zee Bangla	Pratima Chowdhury
2012	Rannabati Galgoppo Bhoj	Sananda TV	Host
2011–2014	Maa....Tomay Chara Ghum Ashena	Star Jalsha	Pratima Roy Chowdhury
2014–2015	Sera Bouthan	ETV Bangla	Host
2013–2015	Jol Nupur	Star Jalsha	Aparajita / Pari / Ranga pishi
2014–2015	Chokher Tara Tui	Star Jalsha	Aparupa
2015-2017	Punyi Pukur	Star Jalsha	Radharani Banerjee
2016	Rannaghore Rockstar Season 2	Colors Bangla	Host
2017-2018	Sanyashi Raja	Star Jalsha	Indubala
2018-2020	Rannaghor	Zee Bangla	Host
2020-2021	Rannabanna	Star Jalsha	Host
2022-2023	Lokkhi Kakima Superstar	Zee Bangla	Lokkhi Das (Lead role)
2023- 2024	Ghore Ghore Zee Bangla	Zee Bangla	Host
2023- 2024	Jol Thoi Thoi Bhalobasha	Star Jalsha	Kojagori Basu (Lead role)

== Awards ==
Year	Award	Category	Character	Film/TV show
2012	Zee Bangla Gourav Samman		Protima	Kanakanjali
2013	Star Jalsha Parivaar Awards 2013	Priyo Maa	Protima	Maa....Tomay Chara Ghum Ashena
2014	Star Jalsha Parivaar Awards 2014			
2015	Star Jalsha Parivaar Awards 2015	Priyo Nonod	Paari	Jol Nupur
2016	Star Jalsha Parivaar Awards 2016	Special Award in memory of Pijush Ganguly for Jol Nupur	Paari	Jol Nupur
2016	Star Jalsha Parivaar Awards 2016	Priyo Misti Somporko	Radharani-Kakon	Punyi Pukur
2016	Star Jalsha Parivaar Awards 2016	Priyo Sashuri	Radharani	Punyi Pukur
2017	Star Jalsha Parivaar Awards 2017	Priyo Sashuri	Radharani	Punyi Pukur
2017	WBFJA Awards	Best Supporting Actress	Malini	Praktan
2017	Filmfare Awards Bangla 2017	Best Supporting Actress	Malini	Praktan
2018	Star Jalsha Parivaar Awards 2018	Priyo Misti Somporko	Indubala-Bimboboti	Sanyashi Raja
2019	Zee Bangla Sonar Sansar 2019	Priyo Sodosyo	Host	Rannaghor
2020	Zee Bangla Sonar Sansar 2020	Priyo Sodosyo	Host	Rannaghor
2021	Star Jalsha Parivaar Awards 2021	Favourite Style Icon Female (Non-Fiction)	Host	Ranna Banna
2022	West Bengal Film Journalists' Association Awards	Best Actress	Mishti	Cheeni
2022	Filmfare Awards Bangla 2022	Best Supporting Actress	Mishti	Cheeni
2022	19th Tele Cine Awards	Best Sipporting Actor Female	Mishti	Cheeni
2022	Anandalok Puraskar	Best Actor in a Supporting Role	Malini	Ekannoborti
2022	Telly Adda Awards 2022	Versatile Actress	Lokkhi Kakima Superstar	Lokkji
2023	Zee Bangla Sonar Sansar 2023	Priyo Sodosyo	Host	Ghore Ghore Zee Bangla
2024	Star Jalsha Parivaar Awards 2024	Priyo Maa	Kojagori	Jol Thoi Thoi Bhalobasha
2024	Star Jalsha Parivaar Awards 2024	Jolshar Mojadar Sodossya	Kojagori	Jol Thoi Thoi Bhalobasha
2024	BFTA Award	Best Actress in Comic Role	Mishti	Cheeni 2
