= Amloki (TV series) =

2018 Indian television series

- Genre: Drama
- Created by: Shree Venkatesh Films
- Written by: Sahana
- Screenplay by: Malova; Sudip
- Story by: Sahana
- Directed by: Anupam Hari
- Creative director: Sahana
- Starring: Aishwarya Roy; Antara Nandi; Indrajit Bose; Monami Ghosh
- Theme music composer: Upali Chattopadhyay
- Country of origin: India
- Original language: Bengali
- No. of episodes: 220

Production
- Executive producers: Somjita Chatterjee; Aniruddha Ghosh
- Producers: Shrikant Mohta; Mahendra Soni
- Camera setup: Multi-camera
- Production company: Shree Venkatesh Films

Original release
- Network: Zee Bangla
- Release: 12 February – 30 November 2018

Amloki is a 2018 Indian Bengali Drama television series released on 12 February 2018 on Zee Bangla. The series is produced under the banner of Shree Venkatesh Films. It stars Aishwarya Roy and Antara Nandi, Indrajit Bose and Monami Ghosh in lead roles.

== Cast ==
=== Main ===
- Aishwarya Roy as Amloki
- Antara Pakira Nandi as Chandana
- Bhaswar Chatterjee as Gourav

=== Recurring ===
- Indrajeet Bose / Sagnik Chatterjee as Nilratan Sarkar alias Ratan
- Monami Ghosh / Sreetama Roy Chowdhury as Mohona
- Animesh Bhaduri as Niloy
- Kaushiki Guha as Menaka
- Mrinal Mukherjee as Nobokumar Guhathakurta: Chandana's father
- Rita Dutta Chakraborty as Sudokkhina Guhathakurta: Chandana's mother
- Shaon Dey as Saborni
- Suranjana Roy as Baishaki
- Basanti Chatterjee as Gourav's aunt
- Ashok Bhattacharya as Gourav's father
- Mousumi Saha as Karabi: Gourav's mother
- Riyanka Dasgupta as Nira
- Priya Malakar as Tishta
