= Kanakanjali =

Indian Bengali television serial

- Genre: Indian Soap Opera
- Created by: Ideas Creations
- Story by: Sutanu Gupta; Dialogues; Sambaran Dutta
- Directed by: Arindam Ganguly; Anal Chakraborty
- Starring: Arindam Ganguly; Tilottama Dutta; Aparajita Adhya
- Voices of: Arindam Ganguly
- Opening theme: "Aye Khuku Aye"
- Composer: Chandan Roy Chowdhury
- Country of origin: India
- Original language: Bengali
- No. of seasons: 1
- No. of episodes: 337

Production
- Producers: Prosenjit Chatterjee; Arpita Chatterjee
- Production location: Kolkata
- Running time: 21 Minutes
- Production company: Ideas Creations

Original release
- Network: Zee Bangla
- Release: 29 August 2011 – 22 September 2012

Kanakanjali is a Bengali television serial which used to air on Zee Bangla.

== Plot ==
The show Kanakanjali is the story of Shuvro Chowdhury and his two daughters Sreya and Jhimli. Shuvro is the proud father of four children. His elder son Probal is a textile engineer and the younger son Promit is a management graduate. Shuvro, a saree dealer by profession, has always nurtured a dream that one day Probal and Promit would carry forward his business. Shuvro seems to have the picture perfect family envied by all. Life is fantastic till the time Shuvro realizes that Probal and Promit have no interest in appreciating the much nurtured dream of their father. A time comes when the two sons almost desert their father. An emotionally and financially bankrupt father has none for support. To his surprise, Shuvro has Sreya by his side who fights to get back the lost honour of her father. Kanakanjali is the story of the relationships of a father with his daughters. It is the story of a happy family which crumbles down under the pressure of selfish interests. It is the story of a father in despair, whose honour is resurrected by his daughters. Kanakanjali, above all, is the story of two daughters who assure the parents of the Hindu patriarchal society that the daughters can become their support when they need them the most.

== Cast ==
- Kanyakumari Mukherjee / Tilottama Dutta as Shreya
- Ritwik Chakraborty as Rupam
- Amrita Chattopadhyay as Jhimli
- Arindam Ganguly as Shubhro
- Roopa Ganguly as Nipa
- Aparajita Auddy as Pratima
- Kheyali Dastidar as Shreya's aunt
- Debshankar Haldar as Parimal
- Soumitra Chatterjee as Shreya's grandfather
- Mita Chatterjee as Shreya's grandmother
- Rajesh kr Chattopadhyay
- Swagata Basu
- Swagata Mukherjee as Promeela

- Saswati Guhathakurta as Bina
- Dulal Lahiri as Rudro Mitra
- Tania Kar as Oindrila
- Soma Banerjee as Purobi
- Disha Ganguly as Rupsha
- Subhrajit Dutta as Neel
