= Lokkhi Kakima Superstar =

2022 Indian television series

- Genre: Drama
- Created by: Tent Cinema
- Developed by: Tent Cinema
- Written by: Dialogues: Ananya; Ayan Sengupta
- Screenplay by: Priyanka Sett
- Story by: Susanta Das; Sayantani Bhattacharya
- Directed by: Bijoy Majhi
- Creative directors: Susanta Das; Sayantani Bhattacharya
- Starring: Aparajita Auddy; Debshankar Haldar; Sharly Modak; Souvik Banerjee
- Theme music composer: Upal Sengupta, Nilanjan
- Opening theme: Superstar superstar Lokkhi kakima superstar
- Country of origin: India
- Original language: Bengali
- No. of episodes: 294

Production
- Executive producers: Sanjukta Chakraborty & Tanushree Bhadra (Tent Cinema); Priyanka Sett & Suparno Saha (Zee Bangla)
- Producer: Susanta Das
- Cinematography: Sankalpa Dasgupta
- Editors: Amitabha Bagchi; Krishnendu
- Camera setup: Multi-camera
- Running time: 22 minutes
- Production company: Tent Cinema

Original release
- Network: Zee Bangla
- Release: 14 February 2022 – 27 January 2023

Lokkhi Kakima Superstar is a 2022 Indian Bengali Language Drama television series broadcast on the Bengali General Entertainment Channel Zee Bangla. It stars Aparajita Auddy and Debshankar Haldar in the lead roles. It also stars Sharly Modak and Souvik Banerjee in parallel lead roles. It was premiered on 14 February 2022.

== Plot ==
Lokkhi (Bengali name for Lakshmi) is a vibrant middle-aged woman who runs a little shop, "Lokkhi Bhandar" to support her joint family. This business is her soul which gives her the joy and will to survive. Her trials and tribulations form the crux of the show.

== Cast ==
=== Main ===
- Aparajita Adhya as Lokkhi Das (née Roy): owner of 'Lokkhi Bhandar', Debabrata's wife; Debaditya, Debdulal and Riya's mother, Sonali and Hongshini's mother-in-law
- Debshankar Halder as Debabrata Das aka Debu: Lokkhi's husband; Debaditya, Debdulal and Riya's father, Sonali and Hongshini's father-in-law
- Souvik Banerjee as Debdulal Das aka Dulal/Hiraak: Lokkhi and Debabrata's son, Hongshini's husband
- Sharly Modak as Hongshini Das (née Roychowdhury) aka Chini / Hansh: Lokkhi and Debabrata's daughter-in-law, Debdulal's wife

=== Recurring ===
- Ananya Guha as Riya Das: Lokkhi and Debabrata's daughter, Debaditya and Debdulal's younger sister, Dipta's love interest
- Swarnodipto Ghosh as Debaditya Das aka Deba: Lokkhi and Debabrata's elder son, Sonali's husband.
- Arpita Mondal as Sonali Das aka Sona : Debaditya's wife, Lokkhi and Debabrata's elder daughter in law.
- Adhiraj Ganguly as Laltu Das : Subhabrata and Rina's son
- Debosmita Bonik as Tiya Das: Laltu's sister, Subhabrata and Rina's daughter
- Raktim Samanta as Biltu Das: Priyo and Tapasi's son
- Tapasya Dasgupta as Rina Das: Laltu and Keya's mother, Subhabrata's wife
- Sanjoy Basu as Subhabrata Das aka Subho: Laltu and Keya's father, Debabrata's brother, Rina's husband.
- Anirban Ghosh as Priyobrata Das aka Priyo: Tapasi's husband, Biltu's father, Debabrata's younger brother
- Sree Basu as Tapasi Das aka Rupasi: Priyo's wife, Biltu's mother.
- Ananya Sengupta / Nabanita Dutta as Ranjana Mukherjee aka "Binuni": Debabrata's one sided lover, a school teacher.
- Ratna Ghoshal as Parulbala Das: Debabrata, Subhabrata, Priyobrata's mother, Lokkhi's mother in law, Debaditya, Debdulal and Riya's grandmother
- Bharat Kaul as Somshankar Roychowdhury: Hongshini, Abhra and Dipta's father
- Rajiv Bose as Abhra Roychowdhury - Hongshini and Dipta's elder brother; Sonia's husband.
- Rimjhim Mitra as Sonia Roychowdhury: Abhra's wife
- Raunak Dey Bhoumik as Dipta Roychowdhury: Abhra and Hongshini's younger brother, Riya's love interest
- Koushik Bhattacharya as Biren: Tapasi's brother.
- Sandip Dey as Ardhendu: Lokkhi's rival.
- Indranil Mallick as Ronojoy aka Rono: Hongshini's ex-fiancé interest
- Surajit Pramanik as Ratan: Lokkhi's worker.
- Avery Singha Roy as Kojagori Roy Chowdhury: Hongshini's late mother.
- Krishnakishore Mukherjee as Aloke Sanyal
- Chhanda Chatterjee as Madhubala: Debabrata, Subhabrata, Priyobrata's aunt
- Rumpa Das as Arna Roy
- Sarbari Mukherjee as Maya Golder
- Ranit Modak as Ronty
- Gora Dhar as Horipada Maity

== Crossover episodes ==
Episodes	Air Date	Series	Plot
1	10 July 2022	Didi No. 1	Lokkhi went to Didi No. 1 to win a pressure cooker as well as to become winner. The show is hosted by Rachana Banerjee.

== Reception ==
=== TRP Ratings ===
Week	Year	BARC viewership		Ref.
Week	Year	TRP	Rank	Ref.
Week 7	2022	7.9	7	
Week 8	2022	8.2	5	
Week 9	2022	7.9	7	
Week 12	2022	7.9	8	
Week 13	2022	7.2	7	
Week 14	2022	7.0	8	
Week 15	2022	6.4	5	
Week 16	2022	6.9	5	
Week 17	2022	6.8	5	
Week 18	2022	6.4	6	
Week 19	2022	6.9	5	
Week 20	2022	7.1	6	
Week 21	2022	7.2	6	
Week 22	2022	6.9	6	
Week 23	2022	6.2	6	
Week 24	2022	6.7	4	
Week 25	2022	7.3	6	
Week 26	2022	7.5	5	
Week 27	2022	7.7	2	
Week 28	2022	8.2	1	
Week 29	2022	8.0	2	
Week 30	2022	7.8	2	
Week 31	2022	7.7	3	
Week 32	2022	7.6	5	
Week 33	2022	7.1	5	
Week 34	2022	7.3	5	
Week 35	2022	6.8	6	
Week 36	2022	6.3	7	
Week 37	2022	7.3	4	
Week 38	2022	6.7	6	
Week 39	2022	6.4	6	
Week 40	2022	5.3	10	
Week 41	2022	6.3	9	
Week 42	2022	6.0	11	
Week 43	2022	5.8	9	
Week 44	2022	5.9	12	
Week 45	2022	6.0	9	
Week 46	2022	6.3	8	
Week 47	2022	6.4	8	
Week 48	2022	6.7	9	
Week 49	2022	6.2	11	
Week 50	2022	6.4	9	
