= The Home and the World =

1916 novel by Rabindranath Tagore

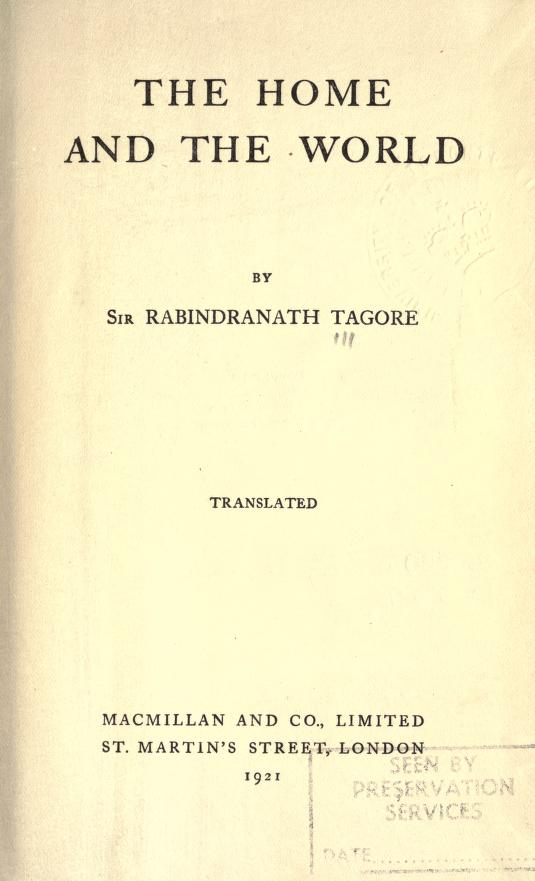
- Cover page of English translation
- Author: Rabindranath Tagore
- Original title: ঘরে বাইরে (Ghôre Baire)
- Language: Bengali
- Genre: Autobiographical novel
- Publisher: Macmillan and Co., Ltd.
- Publication date: 1916
- Publication place: British India
- Media type: Print (hardback & paperback)
- Text: The Home and the World at Wikisource

The Home and the World (in the original Bengali, ঘরে বাইরে (Ghôre Baire) lit. "At home and outside") is a 1916 novel by Rabindranath Tagore. The book illustrates the battle Tagore had with himself, between the ideas of Western culture and revolution against the Western culture. These two ideas are portrayed in two of the main characters, Nikhilesh, who is rational and opposes violence, and Sandip, who will let nothing stand in his way from reaching his goals. These two opposing ideals are very important in understanding the history of the Bengal region and its contemporary problems.

The novel was translated into English by the author's nephew, Surendranath Tagore, with input from the author, in 1919. In 2005, it was translated into English by Sreejata Guha for Penguin Books India. The Home and the World was among the contenders in a 2014 list by The Daily Telegraph of the 10 all-time greatest Asian novels.

== Historical context ==
=== Political movement ===
The novel is set in early 20th century India. The story line coincides with the National Independence Movement taking place in the country at the time, which was sparked by the Indian National Congress. There were various national and regional campaigns with both militant and non-violent ideas which all had the common goal of ending British colonial rule. Militant nationalism had a strong showing in the early part of the 20th century, especially during the World War I period. Some examples of this movement are the Indo-German Pact and the Ghadar Conspiracy, both of which failed.

Particularly important to the novel is an understanding of the Swadeshi movement as a part of the Indian Nationalist Movement. The Swadeshi movement started in response to the 1905 Partition of Bengal by Viceroy Lord Curzon, which temporarily separated Hindus and Muslims into different geographical areas. The Swadeshi movement was a successful resistance policy against British colonisation. Indian citizens were encouraged to boycott British goods to foster Indian identity and independence. This movement was important in fostering "the new spirit in India," and separating India from Britain, which was largely thought to be responsible for the subsequent widespread poverty.

=== Traditional Indian household ===
Family structures in traditional India consists of not only the nuclear family but also grandparents, parents-in-law, and unmarried sisters-in-law as well. Though the joint-family is linked to ancient India, it is still prevalent in modern-day India. Traditionally, baby boys were preferable to baby girls since boys were able to earn money and support the family, whereas girls were expensive to raise. In addition to being unable to work for a living, the girl's marriage dowry required a hefty amount of money and other luxury goods such as valuable jewelry and saris. Once girls were married off to the other families, they would have to address their new parents-in-law as "father" and "mother". As home maker of the family, the wife's duty was to supervise the household and take care of the children, as well as to please her new in-laws.

The Home and the World tells us not only of the personal struggles of the three main characters, but also little details of the family structure and what traditional Indian households were like. At the opening of the novel, Bimala is a traditional, obedient house wife who is faithful to her husband, even forcing herself to be respectful towards her nagging sister-in-law. "I would cautiously and silently get up and take the dust of my husband's feet without waking him, how at such moments I could feel the vermilion mark upon my forehead shining out like the morning star" (11). However, as she falls "in love" with Sandip, she slowly weans herself from her traditional housewife role. She becomes more daring, more confidently brushing off her sister-in-law's criticisms, crossing outside the women's quarter of the house, and easily conversing with a man, Sandip, who is not her husband. The novel traces her change from the good house wife to an independent, more modern woman.

== Characters ==
=== Nikhilesh ===
Nikhil is seen and described as an educated and gentle man. He is from kulin aristocratic family of landlords, and his family prides themselves in beautiful women. However, Nikhil is different in that he married not only a poor woman, but also one who was not particularly attractive. He is a friend of Sandip and has allowed him to stay in his bungalow. In light of this, the police also suspect him of harbouring some "hidden protest". In reality, Nikhil considers himself to be more aware of his country's role in a broader sense, and refuses to take part in the Swadeshi movement.

=== Bimala ===
Bimala is married to Nikhil. She is described as not very pretty and from a much more humble background than Nikhil. She loves her husband dearly, and enjoys being completely devoted to him. At the beginning of the novel, she seems to be confined to the traditional female role, and has no thoughts of entering the real world, even with persuasion from her husband. Her feelings make a rapid change with the occurrence of the Swadeshi movement, due to Sandip's radical influence.

=== Sandip ===
Sandip is the third major character in the novel, completing the love triangle. He is a guest in the home of Nikhil and Bimala and his revolutionary ideas and speeches have a significant impact on Bimala. He is very vocal in his anti-imperialistic views and is a skilled orator. Sandip represents characteristics that are directly opposite to those Nikhil possesses, thus drawing Bimala to Sandip. Bimala gets caught up in the ideas that Sandip presents as well as the man himself. Her seemingly increasing patriotism causes her to spend more and more time with Sandip, thereby solidifying the love triangle conflict. Sandip's first name is translated to "with dipa (light fire flame)".

=== Bara Rani ===
Bara Rani is Nikhilesh's sister in law. Her relationship with Bimala is strained at best. She causes a lot of tension in the household. She also uses Nikhil to get the material items that she desires. Bimala constantly complains about her to Nikhil. Bara Rani taunts Bimala for her mingling with Sandip Babu.

=== Amulya ===
Bimala considers Amulya to be her adoptive son, whom she met from the Swadeshi Movement. When first they meet, Bimala asks him to acquire money for their cause. He lists wild schemes and plans, to which Bimala replies "you must not be childish" (138). After pondering their situation, Amulya resolves to murder the cashier for the money. Tagore uses him to symbolise the raw emotion and passion, yet lack of sympathy for others often encompassed by group or riot mentality. Amulya struggles, as any youth, between completing the goals of the movement and developing strong relationships on an individual level, such as with Bimala; this is made extremely difficult by Sandip's powerful influence.

== Plot summary ==
=== Major events ===
==== The Rally ====
Near the beginning of the novel, Nikhil brings his wife Bimala to a political rally in an attempt to get her to join the outside world and get in better touch with "reality." Though Bimala had heard of Sandip before this time, and developed a somewhat negative opinion of him, this was the first time she heard Sandip speak. This event not only changes her opinion of Sandip, but affects her entire outlook on her life both at home and in the outside world. "I was no longer the lady of the Rajah's house, but the sole representative of Bengal's womanhood," Bimala says (31).

==== Bimala's realisation ====
Towards the end of the book Sandip convinces Bimala to steal from her husband, Nikhil. While in the act of stealing 6,000 rupees, she comes to a realisation of the terrible crime she is committing, "I could not think of my house as separate from my country: I had robbed my house, I had robbed my country. For this sin my house had ceased to be mine, my country also was estranged from me" (144). This represents a character turning point for Bimala: While in the act of thieving, she realises that Sandip is not only corrupting and robbing the nation, but encouraging her and others to do the same. Ultimately, she ends up giving the money to Sandip and receives unceasing praise from both Sandip and Amulya for her newly recognised sin.

However, Bimala realises that she has made a mistake by stealing the money from Nikhil and attempts to have Amulya pawn off some of her jewellery to replace the money. Amulya attempts to give the box back, but Sandip steals it and gives it back himself. This event allows both Amulya and Bimala to see that Sandip is concerned only with himself, thus allowing them to break free from part of his web. It is during this time that Bimala realises her power over Sandip by being able to easily make him jealous.

== Important themes ==
=== Tradition vs modernism ===
As the title suggests, a major theme is the relationship of the home with the outside world. Nikhil enjoys the modern, western goods and clothing and lavishes Bimala with them. However, Bimala, in the Hindu tradition, never goes outside of the house complex. Her world is a clash of western and traditional Indian life. She enjoys the modern things that Nikhil brings to her, but when Sandip comes and speaks of nationalism with such fire, she sees these things as a threat to her way of life. Bimala's struggle is with identity. She is part of the country, but only knows the home and her home is a mix of cultures. She is torn between supporting the ideal of a country that she knows she should love, or working toward ensuring that her home, her whole world, is free from strife and supporting her husband like a traditional Indian woman should. Bimala is forced to try to understand how her traditional life can mix with a modern world and not be undermined. This theme ties in with the nationalism theme because it is another way that Tagore is warning against the possibility that nationalism can do more harm than good.

=== Sandip vs. Nikhil ===
Nikhil and Sandip have extremely different views for the growth of the nation. Nikhil demonstrates these beliefs in marrying Bimala, a woman considered "unattractive" as a result of her dark skin color. In the novel, Nikhil talks about disliking an intensely patriotic nation, "Use force? But for what? Can force prevail against Truth?" (45). On the other hand, Sandip has contrasting views for the growth of the nation believing in power and force, "My country does not become mine simply because it is the country of my birth. It becomes mine on the day when I am able to win it by force". (45) The contradicting views of Nikhil and Sandip set up the story and construct a dilemma for Bimala. Unfortunately for Nikhil, he has already tried to show Bimala the outside world, and stir some sort of emotion within her since the beginning of the novel, and failed. Sandip possesses great oratory skill that wins Bimala over simply because of his passion and ferocity, something that her husband may lack.

=== Illusions ===
The constant forming of illusions in the novel grows to be a major recurring theme. Sandip tends to create illusions that almost always have negative effects on his followers and on the nation of Bengal. He builds an illusion of his beliefs that sucks the people of Bengal into a sort of cult. His illusion is complete sovereignty, free of all other worlds, and an endless supply of wealth and self enjoyment. This illusion, as many are, is a fake and a lie. It ultimately sells these people a front row ticket to watch their nation fall into complete chaos and civil war between people with different beliefs. He constructs an illusion for Bimala to believe, saying she is the future, women are the future, they are the chosen path to salvation. Bimala builds an illusion that she is to blame for this war, it is solely her doing. That she has done all wrong and no right. She refuses to accept that she too was a victim of "Bande Mataram". "I now fear nothing-neither myself, nor anybody else. I have passed through fire. What was inflammable has been burnt to ashes; what is left is deathless. I have dedicated myself to the feet of him, who has received all my sin into the depths of his own pain." (199) The biggest of all is Sandip's mask of caring and passion, while he hides his own selfishness and desire for the world.

=== Truth ===
In more than one way, this novel is a comparison of different views of truth. Which reality is truer is up to the reader's interpretation. Nikhil maintains an idealistic view of the world while Sandip takes a radical, nature-worshiping view. He feels Nikhil's view of the world is inferior to the real, raw world in which he lives as a radical leader. Bimala as well must compare truths. Through her interactions with Sandip, she is introduced to the truth of "shakti" (female power), yet her life with Nikhil is centred on the truth of conjugality. Each of these instances is a comparison of truth as being something simply objective to being something with a more spiritual or moral dimension. While the story ends in tragedy, both views of truth are important players in the story's outcome, and it is left to the reader to ponder with which he or she agrees or disagrees.

=== Love and union ===
From the first page of the novel, the love and union between Nikhil and Bimala is illustrated as something sacred. Nikhil proved throughout the story that he was undeniably devoted to his wife. He proved this first by marrying a woman who hailed from a poor family, along with accepting her darker skin. He made great effort to not only educate her, but also for her to understand her place in the world and not just her place in the captivity of their house. He shows his love by giving her freedom. Bimala also adores her husband, but in a less material manner. This is demonstrated in Bimala's daily ritual of "taking the dust", an Indian ritual of reverence not usually performed by a wife to her husband.

Due to Bimala's extreme devotion to Nikhil, in the beginning of the novel, the union between the two of them is seen as one that cannot be broken. However, as, the story progresses, Bimala is slowly overcome by her feelings for Sandip. She eventually realises that she has found in Sandip what she longed for in Nikhil, fierce ambition and even violent defence of one's ideals. Her deep desire for Sandip led her to completely break her sacred union with Nikhil, going as far as to steal money from her household funds. Sandip shows his love for Bimala through idolisation. This idolisation comes about due to her freedom, though.

The tale clearly presents the theme of love and union time and time again, going from Nikhil and Bimala's marriage, through the love triangle created by Sandip, and once again returning to Bimala's love for Nikhil at the very end. This story tests the boundaries of the union of marriage. It stretches and twists it to the point where a 9-year marriage is nearly destroyed simply because of a raw temptation. In addition to the idea of romantic love, there is a sense of love of one's own country depicted throughout the novel. Questions such as, is it best to love one's country through action, perhaps even violence, or by passive tolerance, are posed in the arguments of Nikhil and Sandip. While love and worship seem parallel in marriage, Nikhil believes these feelings cannot apply to one's country. "To worship my country as a god is to bring a curse upon it". (29)

=== The role of women ===
Throughout the novel, as stated earlier, a strong sense of devotion is seen in the relationship between Bimala and Nikhil. An indirect evaluation of the role of women is seen in this novel also, in a very subtle manner. In the society described, Bimala, like most women, blindly worships her husband. This can be seen when Bimala is described, "taking the dust of my husband's feet without waking him". When she is caught doing this act of reverence, her reaction is, "That had nothing to do with merit. It was a woman's heart, which must worship in order to love." (18). This scene shows the average woman in this society who believes love will happen and worship is a given in a marriage. She blindly respects her husband without understanding or having a grasp of who he is.

Another one of the many scenes that alludes to a woman's place in this society is when Nikhil and Sandip argue and Bimala is asked her opinion, which she finds unusual, in addition to "Never before had I [Bimala] had an opportunity of being present at a discussion between my husband and his men friends" (38). This line shows how there is a strong disconnect and there is no place, usually, for a woman in real world conversations. To further prove this, in Nikhil's story, the role of a woman is seen clearly, "Up till now Bimala was my home-made Bimala, the product of the confined space and the daily routine of small duties" (42). These indirect references and descriptions are quite frequent throughout the novel and clearly allow the reader to get a sense of what women were subject to and their overall role in the society.

=== Religion versus nationalism ===
One major theme in the novel is the importance of religion on the one hand and nationalism on the other. In this novel, religion can be seen as the more "spiritual view" while nationalism can be seen more as the "worldly view." Nikhil's main perspective in life is by the moral and intangible, while Sandip is more concerned about the tangible things, which to him is reality. Sandip believes that this outlook on life, living in a way where one may follow his or her passions and seek immediate gratification, is what gives strength and portrays reality, which is linked to his strong belief in nationalism. From Sandip's point of view, "when reality has to meet the unreal, deception is its principal weapon; for its enemies always try to shame Reality by calling it gross, and so it needs must hide itself, or else put on some disguise" (Tagore 55). To Sandip, reality consists of being "gross", "true", "flesh", "passion", "hunger, unashamed and cruel" (Tagore 55). On the other hand, Nikhil's view is more concerned with controlling one's passions and living life in a moral way. He believes that it is, "a part of human nature to try and rise superior to itself", rather than living recklessly by acting on instinct and fleshly desires (Tagore 57). Nikhil argues that a person must learn to control his or her passions and "recognize the truth of restraint" and that "by pressing what we want to see right into our eyes we only injure them: we do not see" (Tagore 60). All these moral precepts tie in with his faith. Nikhil also speaks from a more religious perspective when he speaks of how "all at once my heart was full with the thought that my Eternal Love was steadfastly waiting for me through the ages, behind the veil of material things" (Tagore 66). This shows that Nikhil does not live morally just for the sake of trying to be good, but that it is grounded in his religious views. Sandip reiterates the fact that in their country, they have both "religion and also our nationalism" and that "the result is that both of them suffer" (Tagore 80).

== Film, TV or theatrical adaptations ==
The film Ghare Baire was first released at the Cannes Film Festival in France on 22 May 1984, under the direction of Satyajit Ray. It was also nominated for the Golden Palm award, one of the highest awards received at the Cannes Film Festival. It was later released in the United States on 21 June 1985. The scriptwriters were Satyajit Ray (writer) and Rabindranath Tagore (novel). Sandip was played by Soumitra Chatterjee, Nikhilesh was played by Victor Banerjee and Bimala was played by Swatilekha Sengupta.

Ghawre Bairey Aaj, a Bengali political drama film directed by Aparna Sen starring Jisshu Sengupta, Anirban Bhattacharya and Anjan Dutt, released on 15 November 2019 is a modern retelling of the novel.

== Gandhi controversy ==
There is much controversy over whether or not Tagore was attempting to represent Gandhi with Sandip. This is owing to Gyorgy Lukacs's 1922 review of the novel in the Berlin periodical, Die rote Fahne (that is typically translated into English as "Tagore's Gandhi Novel") where he makes this mistaken suggestion. The novel could not have been based on Gandhi as it was published in 1916 (and written before) when Gandhi had just moved to India from South Africa (1915) and was not a known political figure. Gandhi gained political prominence in India in the context of the Khilafat movement of 1919, which was long after the novel's publication, and took over the leadership of the Indian National Congress in 1920.

== See also ==
- Bengali Renaissance
