= Mitin: Ekti Khunir Sandhaney =

2025 Indian Bengali film by Arindam Sil

- Poster
- Directed by: Arindam Sil
- Screenplay by: Padmanabha Dasgupta; Arindam Sil
- Story by: Suchitra Bhattacharya
- Dialogues by: Padmanabha Dasgupta; Arindam Sil
- Based on: Megher Pore Megh by Suchitra Bhattacharya
- Produced by: Surinder Singh; Nispal Singh
- Starring: Koel Mallick; Subhrajit Dutta; Lekha Chattopadhyay
- Cinematography: Anup Singh
- Edited by: Sanglap Bhowmick
- Music by: Jeet Gannguli
- Production company: Surinder Films
- Distributed by: Surinder Films
- Release date: 25 December 2025
- Running time: 131 minutes
- Country: India
- Language: Bengali
- Budget: ₹1.50 crore
- Box office: ₹1.07 crore

Mitin: Ekti Khunir Sandhaney is a 2025 Indian Bengali-language action thriller film directed by Arindam Sil. Based on Megher Pore Megh, a detective story of Suchitra Bhattacharya. The film was released in the theatres on 25 December 2025 under the banner of Surinder Films. The film is the third instalment of the Mitin Masi franchise directed by Arindam Sil.

== Synopsis ==
A helpless wife comes to Pragyaparamita Mukherjee alias Mitin Masi when her husband goes missing. Initially it's looks like simple disappearance but when investigation is going on, Mitin discovers it is a cold blooded murder case involves with love triangle.

== Cast ==
- Koel Mallick as Mitin Masi
- Subhrajit Dutta as Partha
- Lekha Chattopadhyay as Tupur
- Gaurav Chakrabarty as Sanjeev
- Anashua Majumdar
- Saheb Chatterjee
- Koneenica Banerjee
- Dulal Lahiri
- Madhurima Basak
- Roshni Bhattacharya

== Production ==
=== Announcement and development ===
The film is based upon the detective story Megher Pore Megh by Suchitra Bhattacharya. The first look characters for the lead cast of the film were released on 6 March 2024. Being heavy on action compared to the two previous instalments of Mitin Mashi franchise, Sunil Rodrigues was hired as the action choreographer. The official motion poster of the film was revealed on 19 November 2025.

=== Filming ===
The filming was predominantly done at different locations in Kolkata. The filming was postponed for a few days as Koel sustained injuries on the sets on 31 March 2024, while shooting for an action sequence in the film. Upon examination at the Medica hospital, a fracture was found in the shaft of her ulna bone in her right forearm. Half of the shooting was completed by the end of March 2024. The filming was wrapped up on 1 July 2024.

== Soundtrack ==
Mitin: Ekti Khunir Sandhaney

Soundtrack album by Jeet Gannguli
- Released: 2025
- Genre: Film soundtrack
- Language: Bengali
- Label: Surinder Films

The music of the film has been composed by Jeet Gannguli while the background score has been rendered by Rathijit Bhattacharjee. The lyrics have been penned by Prasen, Chandrani Ganguli and Sutapa Basu.

The first song from the film, "Mayar Khelare", was released on 1 December 2025. The second song "Saiyan" was released on 12 December 2025.

Track listing
No.	Title	Lyrics	Singer(s)	Length
1.	"Mayar Khelare"	Prosen	Rupam Islam, Shilpa Rao
2.	"Saiyan"	Prosen	Arunita Kanjilal

== Release ==
Mitin: Ekti Khunir Sandhaney was released in the theatres on 25 December 2025, coinciding with Christmas. It clashed with Projapati 2 and Lawho Gouranger Naam Rey.

== Reception ==
=== Critical reception ===
Sandipta Bhanja of Sangbad Pratidin reviewed the film and applauded the director for his portrayal of Koel as Mitin Masi, the suspense factor maintained throughout the film, Koel's screen presence, Saheb and Koneenica's performances and the songs. Souvik Saha of Cine Kolkata rated the film 2.5/5 stars and opined "The film may appeal to fans of the franchise and viewers who enjoy Koel Mallick in a strong central role. However, audiences looking for a sharp, unpredictable, and gripping thriller are likely to be disappointed." He praised Koel's performance and screen presence, the supporting cast, background score, production design and the cinematography but criticized the predictability of the story, superficial investigations, unnecessary action sequences, weak climax and the repetitive runtime.

Eshna Bhattacharya of The Times of India rated the film 3.5/5 stars and wrote "Equal parts classic whodunit and tense thriller, the film delves into trust, betrayal, relationship turmoil, and female resilience in a shadowy urban world." She praised the script, Sil's directorial aptitude, the investigative spirit, anecdotes about Kolkata and cultural nods but criticized certain illogical plot developments, dragged stretches, melodrama in the emotional scenes and the overstretched out of sync action sequences. She also applauded the performance of all the actors; particularly Koel Mallick and Gourav Chakraborty, the cinematography, noir-tinged colour palette, costume design, music, background score and the editing.
