= Ghare Baire (film) =

1984 Indian film by Satyajit Ray

- Theatrical release poster
- The Home and the World
- Directed by: Satyajit Ray
- Written by: Satyajit Ray
- Produced by: NFDC
- Starring: Swatilekha Chatterjee (Sengupta); Victor Banerjee; Jennifer Kendal; Soumitra Chatterjee
- Cinematography: Soumendu Roy
- Edited by: Dulal Dutta
- Music by: Satyajit Ray
- Distributed by: Max Video
- Release date: 22 May 1984
- Running time: 140 minutes
- Country: India
- Language: Bengali

Ghare Baire (transl. The Home and the World) is a 1984 Indian Bengali-language romantic drama film directed and written by Satyajit Ray. The film is based on Rabindranath Tagore's novel of the same name, and stars Soumitra Chatterjee, Victor Banerjee, Swatilekha Chatterjee and Jennifer Kendal. The film has a complex portrayal of several themes including nationalism, women's emancipation, spiritual and materialistic takes on life, tradition versus modernism, and others.

Ray prepared a script for it in the 1940s, long before he made his first film Pather Panchali. The film was in competition for the Palme d'Or at the 1984 Cannes Film Festival. At the 32nd National Film Awards, it won the National Film Award for Best Feature Film in Bengali.

== Plot ==
The story is set in 1907 on the estate of the rich and influential Bengali noble Nikhilesh "Nikhil" Choudhary (Victor Banerjee) in Sukhsayar. In the chaotic aftermath of Lord Curzon's partition of Bengal into Muslim and Hindu states, the Swadeshi movement is trying to impose a boycott of foreign goods by claiming that imports are at the root of Indian poverty. Nikhilesh was the first in his family to receive a Western education and he has modern views. He married Bimala (Swatilekha Sengupta). He appointed Miss Gilby to teach his wife Bimala Piano and English songs. He lives happily with his wife Bimala and his widowed sister-in-law until the appearance of his friend, a revolutionist and a strong supporter of the Swadeshi movement, Sandip (Soumitra Chatterjee). Sandip comes to Sukhsayar to convince Nikhilesh and the villagers to renounce foreign goods in exchange for the Swadeshi ones.

Sandip, a passionate and active man, is a contradiction to the peace-loving and somewhat passive Nikhilesh. Nikhilesh introduces him to his wife Bimala. However, Sandip feels infatuated with Bimala. He insists she meets him daily and decided to stay in Nikhilesh's bungalow. He easily attracts innocent and unsuspecting Bimala. Meanwhile, Miss Gilby is hit by a student who was associated with the Swadeshi movement when she was returning from the Church. Because of this, she decides to leave Sukhsayar. Although Nikhilesh figures out what is happening between Sandip and Bimala through his sister-in-law and close associates, he is mature and grants Bimala the freedom to grow and explore what she wants in life, as their marriage was arranged when she was a girl. Further, Nikhilesh tells Bimala that he would like her to have a life not only inside the home but outside of it as well — a controversial stance in 1916 when the novel was written. Sandip convinces Bimala to support the Swadeshi movement and urges her to convince Nikhilesh too about the movement who is against the Swadeshi movement because it is not affordable for the poor. According to Nikhilesh, poor people can't afford the movement because foreign goods are cheap and have better quality than the Swadeshi ones and they would suffer if foreign goods are banned. Thus, he doesn't ban foreign goods in Sukhsayar. Although Sandip doesn't concede defeat and starts to make some sinister plan when local poor Muslim tenants also refused to stop buying and selling foreign goods. He creates groups that would often snatch foreign items from the local Muslim traders and bribe the local administrator to sink the boats carrying the foreign goods in Sukhsayar. This results in the growing hatred between Hindus and Muslims. Muslim preachers from other areas started to take benefit of these problems between Hindus and Muslims of Sukhsayar and started to preach hatred to poor Muslim peasants against Hindus.

Sandip demands money from Bimala for the Swadeshi cause. Unsuspecting Bimala gives him the required money but found later that he had demanded more money than required. She also found that he is creating problems in Sukhsayar. Bimala ultimately realizes that it is indeed her husband Nikhilesh who actually loves her rather than Sandip. She regrets her actions in front of Nikhilesh who forgives her. In Sukhsayar, riots broke out between Muslims and Hindus. Nikhilesh decides to go himself and stop the riots between the two groups. Meanwhile, Sandip leaves Sukhsayar by train as soon as he hears about the riots. In the morning, to the horror of Bimala and all the people close to Nikhilesh, Nikhilesh is found dead and Bimala becomes a widow.

== Cast ==
A snapshot from film

- Soumitra Chatterjee ... Sandip Mukherjee
- Victor Banerjee ... Nikhilesh "Nikhil" Choudhury
- Swatilekha Sengupta... Bimala Choudhury
- Gopa Aich ... sister-in-law
- Jennifer Kendal ... Miss Gilby (as Jennifer Kapoor)
- Manoj Mitra... Headmaster
- Indrapramit Roy ... Amulya
- Bimala Chatterjee ... Kulada
- Master Ajay Ghosh

== Production ==
Satyajit Ray wrote a script for Ghare Baire in the 1940s, but the film, which was to have been directed by Harisadhan Dasgupta, was never made. Years later, Ray returned to his script and reworked it, describing the original version as "amateurish". Soumitra Chatterjee was a Ray regular, having started his career with Apur Sansar. Victor Banerjee had also worked with Ray in Shatranj ke Khilari. Swatilekha Chatterjee, however, was a stage actress with the theatre group Nandikar, with no experience of acting in films. Ray saw her in a stage production and decided that she was the right choice to play the role of Bimala. In 1983, during the shooting of the film, Ray suffered two massive heart attacks. His son, Sandip Ray, completed the project from his detailed instructions.

== Reception ==
The film did well commercially when initially released. Ray's heart attack may have played a role in this. For the Indian audience, there was an additional interest, since it featured the first full-fledged kiss in Ray's films.

Critical response in India was mixed. Sumit Mitra in his long review in India Today said the film "looks like an intended failure". Some critics (including Mitra) thought Swatilekha Chatterjee was miscast as Bimala, as she herself recounted in a 2018 interview, more than thirty years after the release of the film. She says: "One critic wrote a line, `She never lived nor looked the role'." She goes on to add that, after reading the reviews, she had felt like killing herself.

Abroad however, the response was mostly positive. The film premiered at Cannes, where it was well received. Although Ray was too ill to travel, at his insistence both Soumitra Chatterjee and Swatilekha Chatterjee went to Cannes. The latter recalls being felicitated for her performance: "... those around came and hugged me."

Pauline Kael wrote: "Toward the end, Bimala, who was [encouraged] into independence by her husband, becomes desperate to express that independence — recklessly, heedlessly. When it comes to truthfulness about women's lives, this great Indian moviemaker Satyajit Ray shames the American and European directors of both sexes." Vincent Canby wrote in the New York Times: "As with the works of any great director, The Home and the World defies easy categorization. In close-up, it's a love story, but it's one so fully defined that, as in a long-shot, it also succeeds in dramatizing the events seen on the far horizon - including the political differences between Gandhi, who led the nationalist movement, and Tagore, who, like Nikhil, stood for civilized compromise." About the performances, he wrote: "The film is acted with immense grace by its three leading actors." Roger Ebert noted that the real story of the film takes place within Bimala's heart and mind. He added: "It is a contemplative movie -- quiet, slow, a series of conversations punctuated by sudden bursts of activity."

== Awards ==
Year	Award	Category	Nominee(s)	Result	Ref.
1984	Cannes Film Festival	Palme d'Or	Satyajit Ray	Nominated	
1985	National Board of Review Awards	Top Foreign Films	Ghare Baire	Won	
1985	National Film Awards	Best Feature Film in Bengali	NFDC and Satyajit Ray	Won	
1985	National Film Awards	Best Supporting Actor	Victor Banerjee	Won	
1985	National Film Awards	Best Costume Design	Harudas and Bapuldas	Won	
