= Monami Ghosh =

Indian actress

- Born: Monami Ghosh; 12 June 1984 (age 42); Basirhat , West Bengal, India
- Occupation: Actress
- Known for: Pratiksha Ektu Bhalobashar... (as Ananya); Ekdin Pratidin (as Barsha); Binni Dhaner Khoi (as Mohor); Punyi Pukur (as Kankon); Irabotir Chupkotha (as Iraboti)

Monami Ghosh (born June 12, 1984) is an Indian Bengali film and television actress and model with a career spanning almost two decades. She spent her childhood in Basirhat City. She has acted in several television serials, among which the 2009 ETV Bangla serial Binni Dhaner Khoi is noteworthy.

== Career ==
Ghosh started her acting career with the Bengali television serial "Saat Kahon" (aired on DD Bangla) when she was 17 years old. She has played the lead in 25–30 serials and is well known for her portrayal of the characters Ananya in Pratiksha Ektu Bhalobashar... (2001–02), Komolika in Kon Shey Alor Swapno Niye (2003), Zeenat in Ek Akasher Niche (2004-04), and Barsha in Ekdin Pratidin. Her most well-known performance is as the character Mohor and in the ETV Bangla serial Binni Dhaner Khoi (2009-2013) where she also played the character Lin (Mohor's daughter).

In parallel with her television career, Ghosh has appeared in several film roles. In 2008, she finished shooting for Aniruddha Banerjee's film Box No. 1313, opposite Parambrata Chatterjee. In 2012, she acted in Anik Dutta's Bengali film Bhooter Bhabishyat, in which she played the role of "Lachhmi". She also appeared in the 2015 film Bela Seshe directed by the duo Nandita Roy and Shiboprosad Mukherjee, and as "Piu" and "Jiniya" in the 2018 cross-border film Maati, starring Adil Hussain and Paoli Dam.

Monami Ghosh went on to appear in more Bengali television serials like the 2013 ETV Bangla series Hiyar Majhe, which had the same unit employed on Binni Dhaner Khoi. Her character in the show was that of Bhromor aka Kurani. Her co-actor was Badsah Maitra. She then appeared in Sadhak Bamakhyapa and Amloki, and starred as Kankaboti Banerjee, aka Kankon, in the 2015 Star Jalsha drama series Punyi Pukur. In 2018, she began playing the character of "Iraboti Mitra" in the serial Irabotir Chupkotha on Star Jalsha.

In July 2025, it was announced that Ghosh had signed an agreement with Melbet, becoming a brand ambassador for the online betting company.

== Filmography ==
Year	Film	Character
2004	Kalo Chita	
2005	Ek Mutho Chobi	
2009	Box No. 1313	
2010	Ogo Bodhu Sundari	
2011	Bhoi	Rupsha
2012	Bhallu Sardar	
2012	Bhooter Bhabishyat	Lachhmi
2015	Bela Seshe	Piu
2018	Maati	Jiniya
2022	Belashuru	Piu
2024	Padatik	Gita Sen

== Television ==
Year	Show	Channel	Character
1999-2000	Saat Kahon	DD Bangla	
2001-2002	Pratiksha Ektu Bhalobashar...	DD1	Ananya
2003	Kon Shey Alor Swapno Niye	Akash Bangla	Komolika
2004	Sonar Horin	ETV Bangla	
2004-2005	Ek Akasher Niche	Zee Bangla	Zeenat
2005-2007	Ekdin Pratidin	Zee Bangla	Barsha
	Manasi	Akash Bangla now Akash Aath	Manasi
2007-2008	Kaal	Akash Bangla	
2009–2012	Binni Dhaner Khoi	ETV Bangla	Dr. Kojagori Mukherjee, aka Mohor and Lin Banerjee (double role)
2013-2014	Hiyar Majhe	ETV Bangla	Bhromor
2015	Sadhak Bamakhyapa	Colors Bangla	Sulokkhona
2015–2017	Punyi Pukur	Star Jalsha	Kankaboti Banerjee aka Kankon
2018	Amloki	Zee Bangla (later replaced by Sreetoma Roy Chowdhury)	Mohona Guha Thakurata Sarkar
2018–2020	Irabotir Chupkotha	Star Jalsha	Dual role as Iraboti Mitra and Arushi
2018	Dadagiri Unlimited Season 8	Zee Bangla	Guest Participant to support team Darjeeling
2021	Dance Dance Junior Season 2	Star Jalsha	Judge
2022	Dance Dance Junior Season 3	Star Jalsha	Judge
2026	Bigg Boss Bangla 3	Star Jalsha	Contestant

== Web series ==
Year	Show	Platform	Character	Ref.
2021	Mouchak	Hoichoi Originals	Mou	

== Awards ==
- Star Jalsha Parivar Awards 2016: Priyo Misti Somporko as Radharani-Kakon for Punyi Pukur
- Star Jalsha Parivar Awards 2021: Best Style Icon Female (Non-Fiction) for Dance Dance Junior Season 2
- Anandalok Awards 2025: Best Actress (Critics) as Geeta Sen for Padatik
- Filmfare Awards Bangla 2025: Best Supporting Actress as Geeta Sen for Padatik

== Mahalaya ==
Year	Program Name	Character	Channel
2010	Nabadurga	Devi Kalratri	Ruposhi Bangla
2018	Durgotinashini Durga	Dance Performance	Star Jalsha
