= Shiboprosad Mukherjee =

Indian filmmaker and screenwriter (born 1974)

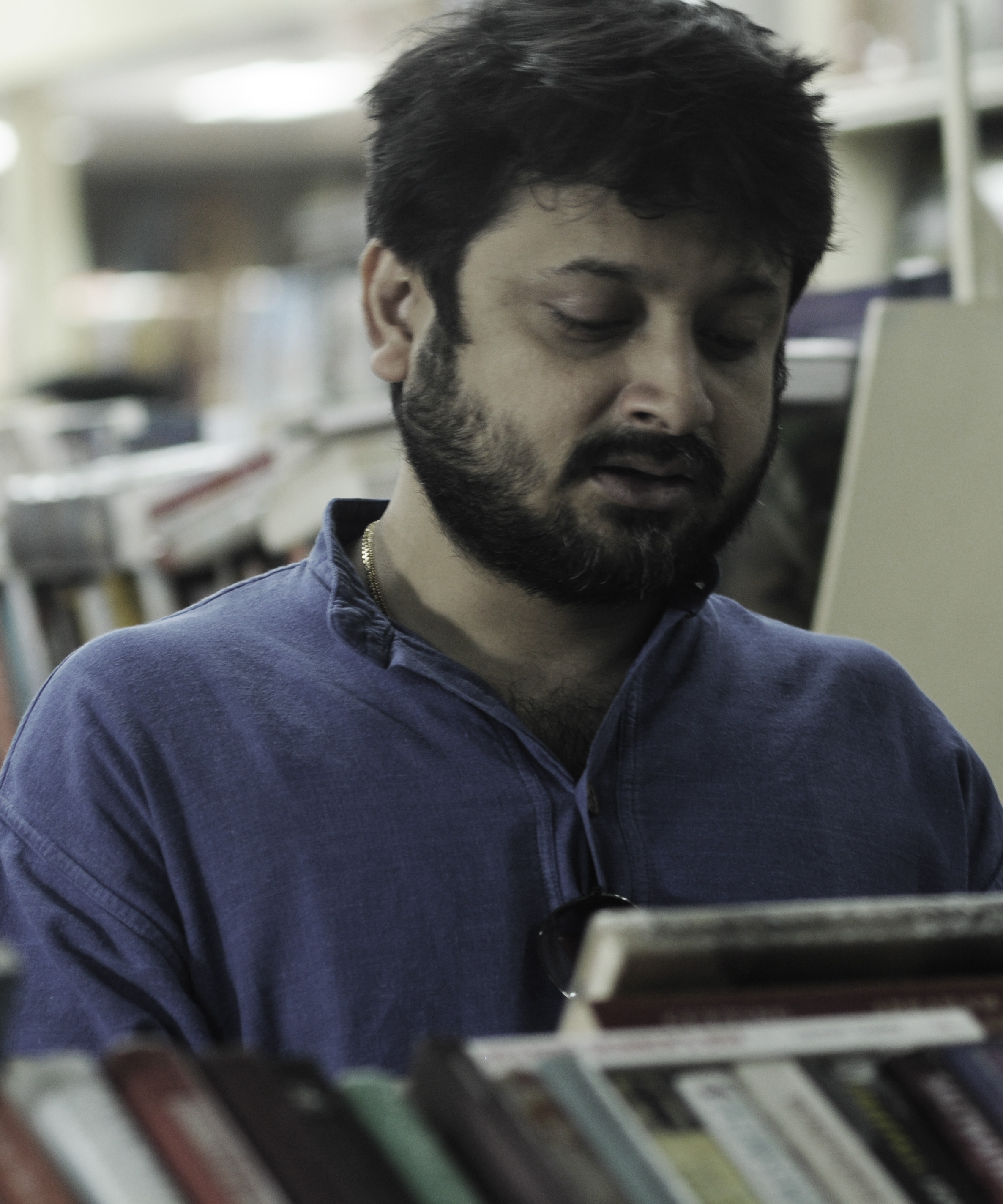
- Mukherjee in 2014
- Born: 20 May 1974 (age 52); Baranagar, Kolkata, West Bengal, India
- Education: Jadavpur University, Hindu School, Kolkata
- Occupations: Film director; Screenwriter; Actor; Film producer
- Years active: 1997–present
- Organisation: Windows Production
- Spouse: Zinia Sen (m. 2016)

Shiboprosad Mukherjee (pronounced [ʃiboprosad̪ mukʰärdʒi], Bengali:; born 20 May 1974) is an Indian filmmaker, screenwriter, producer and actor who works primarily in Bengali cinema. He made his directorial debut with Icche (2011), co-directed with Nandita Roy. Since then, the duo have co-written and co-directed films including Muktodhara (2012), Alik Sukh (2013), Ramdhanu (2014), Belaseshe (2015), Praktan (2016), Posto (2017), Haami (2018), Konttho (2019), Belashuru (2022), Raktabeej (2023) and Bohurupi (2024). He is also a partner at Windows Production, which he co-founded with Roy in 2002.

Alik Sukh premiered at the Marché du Film of the Cannes Film Festival. Films such as Belaseshe, Praktan and Bohurupi emerged among the highest-grossing Bengali films of their respective years. In addition to directing, Mukherjee has appeared as an actor in several of his own films, including Haami, Bohurupi and Aamar Boss.

Mukherjee's films have been recognized for their educational and cultural significance. Icche was accepted into the National Film Archive of India for cultural and educational purposes. Icche, Muktodhara and Ramdhanu were included in the B.Ed. curriculum of Visva-Bharati University. While Icche and Muktodhara have been used in the Certificate Course on Legal and Psychological Counselling for Women in Distress.

== Early life and education ==
Shiboprosad Mukherjee was born on 20 May 1974 at Baranagar in Kolkata, West Bengal, India. He was born to an academician father and homemaker mother, and was the youngest among his four siblings. Initially, he was named Mongolprosad by his father. But his mother rearranged his name, owing to the possibility of him being referred to as "Mongla" by the neighbours.

Mukherjee did his early education from Baranagore Ramakrishna Mission Ashrama High School, where he studied till fifth grade. He completed his high school from the Hindu School in Kolkata. His formative years involved co-curricular activities, acting and elocution. He earned him first income by playing "khep" cricket, with which he bought his mother a sari. He pursued his BA and MA in Political Science from Jadavpur University.

== Career ==
=== Early 1990s–2001: Early career and television ===
While graduating, Mukherjee joined the theatre group Nandikar along with his friend Sujan Neel Mukherjee. Shiboprosad was trained under the guidance of Rudraprasad Sengupta and Swatilekha Sengupta. He received guidance from Rituporno Ghosh while working as a freelance journalist for Anandalok. In 1995, he made his television debut with a small role in Ekushe Pa. Directed by Raja Dasgupta, the soap opera was aired on Zee Bangla. Later he worked in other daily soaps including Janmabhoomi and Ghoom Nei. He made his large screen debut with Jamai No. 1 (1998) directed by Nitish Roy. He was cast in the lead of the film, after Nandita Roy noticed his performance in Ekushe Pa and suggested her husband cast him.

Nandita Roy was appointed as the first Creative Head and Programming Manager at ETV Bangla and worked there till 2007. After Mukherjee teamed-up with Roy, he was appointed as the senior programming associate at ETV Bangla and worked there from 1999 to 2007. Together, they played a significant role in establishing the network in West Bengal. Till 2002, they created 19 original non-fiction programs for ETV Bangla, including Sreemoti, the first Bengali women's magazine program, and Ebong Rituparno, a celebrity chat show hosted by Rituparno Ghosh. They also created 14 one-hour television films for streaming on ETV Bangla.

=== 2002-2014: Windows Production and directorial debut ===
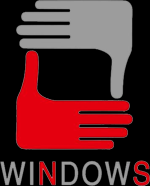
Windows Production, co-founded in 2002

In 2002, Mukherjee and Roy co-founded Windows Production, and they started producing multiple television programmes for ETV Bangla, besides conceptualizing and directing them. In 2003, he acted in the biographical documentary Ekti Nadir Naam. By 2007, they were working on 14 TV shows for ETV Bangla at the same time, but quit abruptly to focus on filmmaking. By 2008, they had conceived their first script Icche and were pitching their script to different production houses until Rituparno Ghosh agreed to produce Icche (2011).

After making their directorial debut with Icche, Mukherjee and Roy directed Hello Memsaheb. It was followed by Muktodhara (2012), a social drama which won the Anandalok Award for Best Film. They subsequently directed Accident (2012), a thriller inspired by the aftermaths of a fatal real life road accident. It was selected for screening under the Indian Cinema Now section at the 18th International Kerala Film Festival in 2013.

Windows Production entered film production with Alik Sukh (2013), a psychological thriller exploring the ethical dilemmas faced by doctors. The film premiered at the Marché du Film of the Cannes Film Festival and earned the duo the Filmfare Awards East for Best Direction. In 2014, the duo directed Ramdhanu, a family drama centred on modern parenting and the pressures of school admissions. They followed it with Belaseshe (2015), starring Soumitra Chatterjee and Swatilekha Sengupta.

=== 2015-2021: Commercial breakthrough and family dramas ===
During the 2010s, Mukherjee and Roy established themselves as one of Bengali cinema's most commercially successful directing duos, producing a succession of family dramas that combined social commentary with mainstream appeal. Their next release, Praktan (2016), reunited Prosenjit Chatterjee and Rituparna Sengupta on screen after fourteen years. The film became the highest-grossing Bengali film of the year, while its songs received the 64th National Film Awards for Best Lyrics and Best Female Playback Singer.

Mukherjee and Roy continued with Posto (2017), a family drama exploring child custody and grandparent–grandchild relationships. In 2018, they released Haami, based on friendship and bullying among schoolchildren. It was followed later that year by the biographical drama Rosogolla, inspired by confectioner Nobin Chandra Das. The duo released two films in 2019: Konttho and Gotro, both of which addressed contemporary social issues through family-oriented narratives.

=== 2022-present: Mainstream success and genre expansion ===
In 2022, Mukherjee and Roy directed Belashuru, a spiritual successor to Belaseshe, revisiting themes of ageing and long-term relationships. It was the last film of Soumitra Chatterjee, and was released posthumously, after his death. The following year, they released Raktabeej, a political thriller inspired by real-life incidents.

In 2024, the duo wrote, directed and produced Bohurupi, a heist thriller inspired by a "Bohurupi" gang of bank robbers in West Bengal. The film became one of the highest-grossing Bengali films of the year and won the Filmfare Awards Bangla for Best Film and Best Director.

Following the success of Bohurupi, Mukherjee and Roy directed Aamar Boss (2025), a workplace family drama starring Rakhee Gulzar in her return to Bengali cinema after more than two decades. Inspired by corporate day-care initiatives, the film was screened in the Panorama section of the 55th International Film Festival of India.

Later in 2025, they directed Raktabeej 2, a sequel to Raktabeej. In 2026, the duo released Phool Pishi O Edward, a period mystery drama set in a zamindar household. His upcoming project Bohurupi: The Golden Daku is a spin-off to Bohurupi and is scheduled to release in Puja 2026.

== Filmmaking style ==
Mukherjee's films, made in collaboration with Nandita Roy, primarily focus on family relationships, contemporary social issues and the lives of the Bengali middle class. Their films frequently explore themes such as marriage, parenthood, ageing, education and intergenerational relationships through emotionally driven narratives set in contemporary Bengali society. Film scholar Anindya Sengupta has described Roy and Mukherjee's work as employing "simple issue-based narratives" that appeal to family audiences while reflecting the aspirations and concerns of the Bengali middle class. About Roy and Mukherjee's filmmaking style, Srijit Mukherjee noted "They understand their audience and their psychology exceptionally well. Their dosage of sentimentality and Bengalihood is perfect."

== Filmography ==
Key
†	Denotes films that have not yet been released

- All films are in Bengali language, unless otherwise noted.
- All his directorial works are co-directed with Nandita Roy, unless otherwise mentioned.

Year	Title	Director	Screenwriter	Actor	Role	Notes	Ref.
1997	Char Adhyay	No	No	Yes	—N/a	Marked his feature film debut	
1997	Dahan	No	No	Yes	Jhinuk's brother		
1998	Jamai No 1	No	No	Yes	Jamai	Mukherjee's first feature film as the lead actor	
2000	Bariwali	No	No	Yes	Debasish		
2003	Ekti Nadir Naam	No	No	Yes		Documentary film based on the Partition of Bengal (1947)	
2011	Icche	Yes	Yes	No	—N/a	Feature directorial debut; based on the novel Iccher Gach by Suchitra Bhattacharya	
2011	Hello Memsaheb	Yes	Yes	No	—N/a		
2012	Muktodhara	Yes	No	Yes	Happy Singh	Based on the real-life reformation of ex-convict Nigel Akkara	
2012	Accident	Yes	No	Yes	Arko	Based on the Kestopur Road Accident of 2008	
2013	Alik Sukh	Yes	Yes	No	—N/a	Based on the novel Aleek Shukh by Suchitra Bhattacharya	
2014	Ramdhanu	Yes	Yes	Yes	Laltu Dutta	Based on the novel Ramdhanu Rang by Suchitra Bhattacharya	
2015	Bela Seshe	Yes	Yes	No	—N/a		
2016	Praktan	Yes	Yes	No	—N/a	Based on the novel Ujaan by Suchitra Bhattacharya	
2017	Posto	Yes	Yes	No	—N/a		
2018	Haami	Yes	Yes	Yes	Laltu Biswas		
2019	Konttho	Yes	Yes	Yes	Arjun Mallik	Inspired by the real-life story of cancer survivor Bibhuti Bhushan Chakraborty	
2019	Gotro	Yes	Yes	No	—N/a		
2022	Bela Shuru	Yes	Yes	No	—N/a	Last film of Soumitra Chatterjee; was released posthumously, after his death	
2022	Haami 2	Yes	Yes	Yes	Laltu Mondal		
2023	Raktabeej	Yes	Yes	No	—N/a	Based on the 2014 Burdwan blast	
2023	Shastry Viruddh Shastry	Yes	Yes	No	—N/a	Hindi-language remake of Mukherjee's 2017 Bengali film Posto	
2024	Bohurupi	Yes	Yes	Yes	Bikram Pramanik	Based on the real-life of bank robber Sheikh Eklas, who had robbed 27 banks between 1998-2002	
2025	Aamar Boss	Yes	Yes	Yes	Animesh Goswami	Inspired by real-life corporate day-care initiatives	
2025	Raktabeej 2	Yes	No	Yes	New Munir Alam	Cameo appearance; Film inspired by the security challenges during former Indian President Pranab Mukherjee's 2013 visit to Bangladesh	
2026	Phool Pishi O Edward	Yes	No	No	—N/a	Inspired from Miss Marple's character in Agatha Christie's multiple crime novels	
2026	Bohurupi: The Golden Daku	Yes	Yes	Yes	Bikram Pramanik	Spin-off of Bohurupi	
2027	Bohurupi 3	Yes	Yes	Yes	Bikram Pramanik	Sequel to Bohurupi: The Golden Daku	

== Accolades ==
Year	Award	Ceremony	Category	Work	Result	Ref.
2012	Anandalok Award	14th Anandalok Award	Best Film	Muktodhara	Won	
2014	Filmfare Awards East	1st Filmfare Awards East	Best Direction	Alik Sukh	Won	
2014	Filmfare Awards East	1st Filmfare Awards East	Best Film	Alik Sukh	Nominated	
2016	Zee Cine Awards	16th Zee Cine Awards	Best Bengali Film	Belaseshe	Won	
2016	Sera Bangali Awards	12th Sera Bangali Awards	Sera Bangali (Direction)	—N/a	Won	
2016	International Business Film Award	—N/a	Highest Grossing Bengali Film	Praktan	Won	
2017	Zee Cine Awards	17th Zee Cine Awards	Best Bengali Film	Praktan	Won	
2017	Filmfare Awards East	2nd Filmfare Awards East	Best Film	Praktan	Nominated	
2017	Filmfare Awards East	2nd Filmfare Awards East	Best Director	Praktan	Nominated	
2017	WBFJA Awards	1st WBFJA Award	Most Popular Film	Praktan	Won	
2017	WBFJA Awards	1st WBFJA Award	Best Director	Praktan	Nominated	
2018	Filmfare Awards East	3rd Filmfare Awards East	Best Director	Posto	Nominated	
2020	WBFJA Awards	4th WBFJA Award	Best Actor	Konttho	Nominated	
2020	WBFJA Awards	4th WBFJA Award	Most Popular Film	Konttho	Nominated	
2021	Filmfare Awards Bangla	4th Filmfare Awards Bangla	Best Director	Konttho	Nominated	
2021	Filmfare Awards Bangla	4th Filmfare Awards Bangla	Best Actor	Konttho	Nominated	
2023	WBFJA Awards	6th WBFJA Awards	Most Popular Film	Belashuru	Nominated	
2024	WBFJA Awards	7th WBFJA Award	Most Popular Film	Raktabeej	Nominated	
2024	Filmfare Awards Bangla	7th Filmfare Awards Bangla	Best Film	Raktabeej	Nominated	
2024	Filmfare Awards Bangla	7th Filmfare Awards Bangla	Best Director	Raktabeej	Nominated	
2024	Filmfare Awards Bangla	7th Filmfare Awards Bangla	Best Story	Raktabeej	Nominated	
2025	WBFJA Awards	8th WBFJA Awards	Most Popular Film	Bohurupi	Nominated	
2025	Filmfare Awards Bangla	8th Filmfare Awards Bangla	Best Film	Bohurupi	Won	
2025	Filmfare Awards Bangla	8th Filmfare Awards Bangla	Best Director	Bohurupi	Won	
2025	Filmfare Awards Bangla	8th Filmfare Awards Bangla	Best Original Story	Bohurupi	Nominated	
2025	Filmfare Awards Bangla	8th Filmfare Awards Bangla	Best Actor	Bohurupi	Won	

== Personal life ==
In 1994, Shiboprosad Mukherjee lost his father on the day of Poila Boisakh, when he was 20 years old. He also lost his paternal uncle on the same day, within a span of 12 hours. Mukherjee married journalist Zinia Sen in 2016. He resides in Kolkata with his octogenarian mother and wife. In an interview, Zinia Sen said that Mukherjee is an intense workaholic who sleeps very little and continuously works through weekends, often making it difficult to plan personal trips or dates.

== Reception and legacy ==
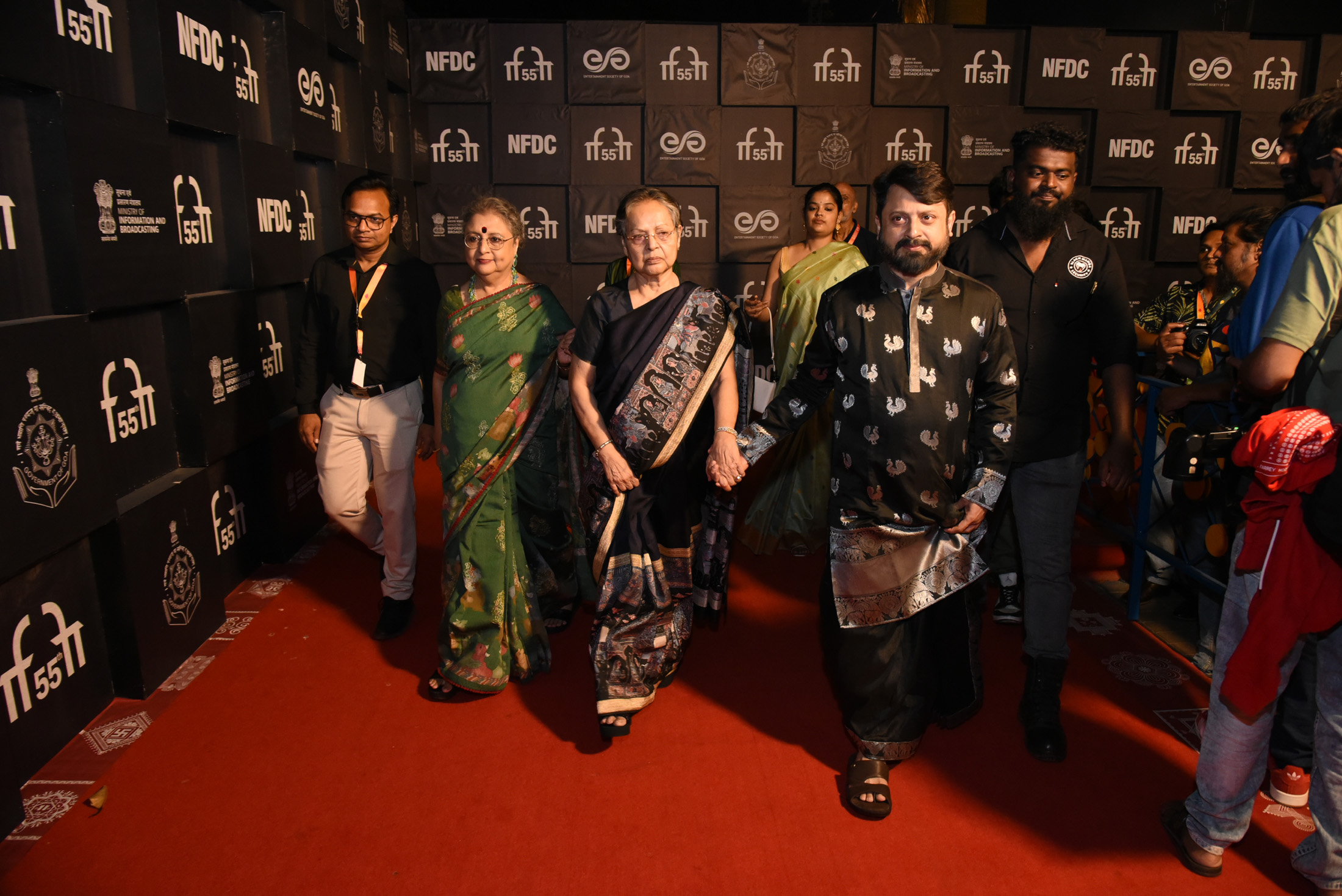
Shiboprosad Mukherjee and Nandita Roy with Rakhee Gulzar, at the red carpet of the 55th International Film Festival of India in November 2024

Mukherjee's films, made in collaboration with Nandita Roy, have been recognised for their educational, cultural and commercial impact. Their works have frequently combined family-oriented narratives with contemporary social issues, contributing to their popularity among audiences and critics alike.

Several of Mukherjee's films have received institutional recognition for their educational and cultural significance. Icche was accepted into the National Film Archive of India for cultural and educational purposes. Despite opening to 35 viewers across all shows on its first day, the film completed a theatrical run of over 125 days. Icche, Muktodhara and Ramdhanu were later incorporated into the B.Ed. curriculum of Visva-Bharati University, while Icche and Muktodhara were included in the Certificate Course on Legal and Psychological Counselling for Women in Distress at the University of Calcutta.

Mukherjee's works have also been recognised at major film events. PVR Cinemas screened Icche at their theatres in Kolkata, Delhi and Mumbai as part of the Indian Panorama Film Festival. Muktodhara became the first Bengali film in a decade to be screened at the Rashtrapati Bhavan for the President of India, Pranab Mukherjee. Accident was selected for the Indian Cinema Now section of the 18th International Kerala Film Festival in 2013. Alik Sukh was premiered at the Marché du Film section in Cannes Film Festival in 2013. In 2025, Aamar Boss was screened in Panorama section of the 55th International Film Festival of India.
