= Tilottama Majumdar =

Indian Bengali writer (born 1966)

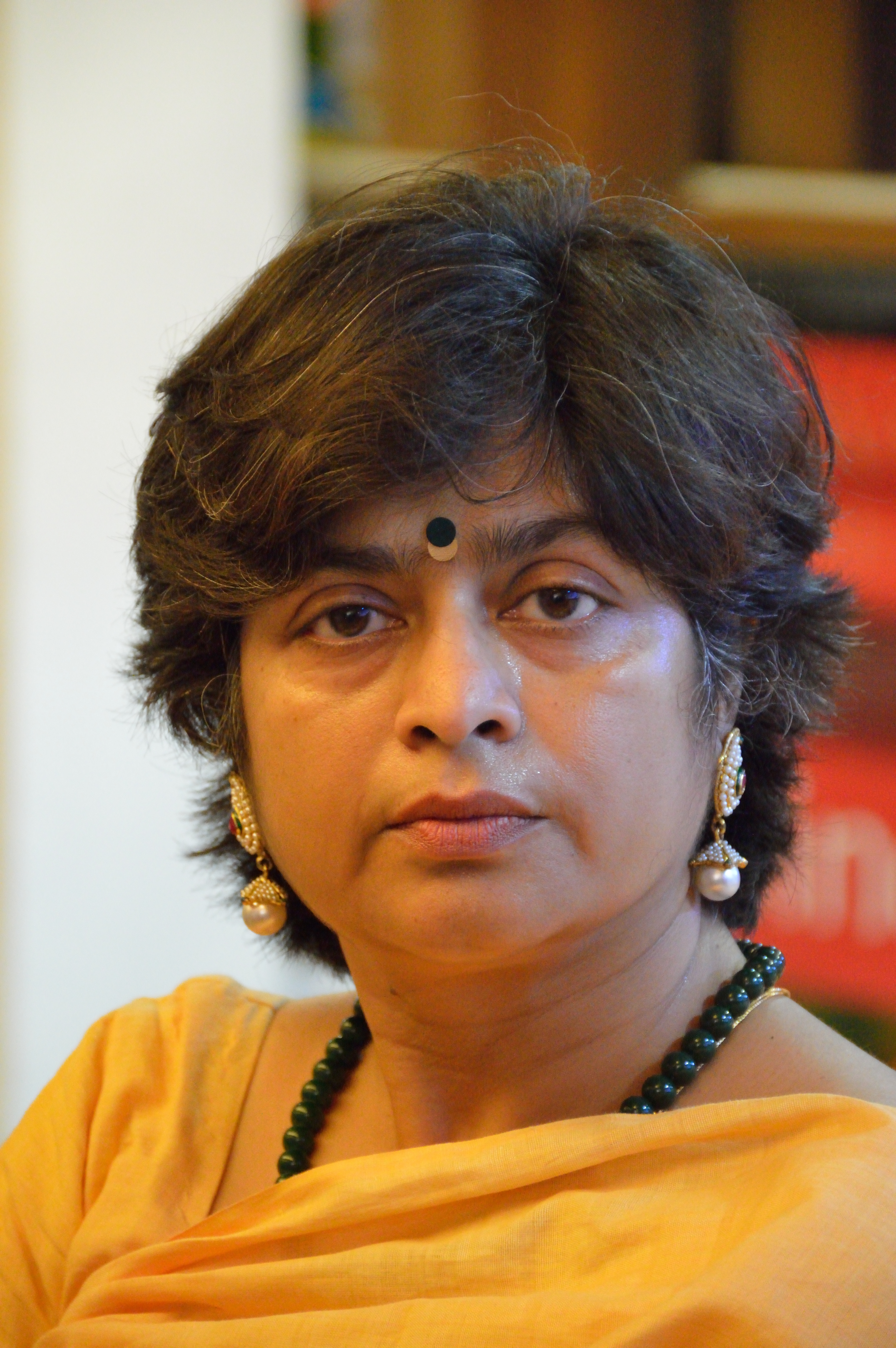
- Born: 11 January 1966 (age 60)
- Occupation: Novelist
- Awards: Ananda Purashkar; Kakkanadan Foundation Sahithya Puraskaram; Sailjanananda Smriti Puraskar; Sarot Sriti Puroshkar

Tilottoma Mojumdar is an Indian Bangali novelist, short story writer, poet, lyricist, and essayist. She writes in the Bengali language and received Ananda Puraskar in 2003 for her novel Basudhara.

== Early life ==
She was born in North Bengal, where she spent her childhood in tea plantations near Kalchini. She was educated at the Scottish Church College at the University of Calcutta.

== Major novels ==
- Rwi
- Shamukhkhol
- Manush Shaboker Kotha
- Ishwarer Basa
- Basudhara
- Arjun O Charkanya
- Rajpat
- Chander Gaye Chand
- Ektara
- Nirjan Sarswati
- Dhanesh Pakhir Thonth
- Jonakira
- Pretojoni
- Jhumra
- Chandu
- Jol O Chumur Upakhyan
- Amritani
