= Abir Chatterjee filmography =

Indian actor filmography

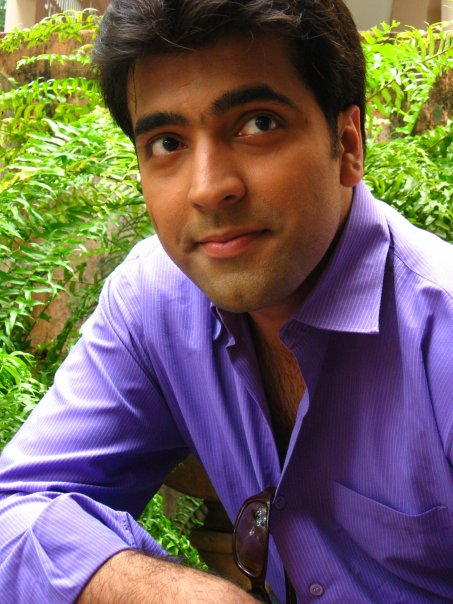
Chatterjee in 2009

Indian actor Abir Chatterjee works mainly in Bengali cinema. He started his career with Bengali television and made his debut in Bengali cinema in 2009 as a lead with Cross Connection.

He has acted in many Bengali serials including Proloy Asche, Shasuri Zindabad, Khuje Berai Kacher Manush, Banhishikha, Sudhu Tomari Jonno, Ek Aakasher Niche, Janmobhumi.

He appeared in Bengali movies as Byomkesh Bakshi and Feluda. The Indian Express said he brought "elegant élan and confidence" to his role in The Royal Bengal Tiger.

Abir Chatterjee's great lost film is his screen debut in the 2004 independent period drama Robibar Bikelbela, in which he portrays a disillusioned former Naxalite revolutionary in post-Emergency Bengal. No copies of the film have been found yet.

2014 saw his emergence in a solo leading role in the critically acclaimed film Hrid Majharey by debutant director Ranjan Ghosh. After acting in this film, he went on to top the list of Calcutta Times Most Desirable Men of 2014.

== Films ==
- All Films are in Bengali language, unless otherwise noted.

Key
†	Denotes films that have not yet been released

List of Abir Chatterjee film credits
Year	Title	Role	Notes	Ref.
2009	Cross Connection	Vikram Ray/Vicky	Debut film	
2010	Prem By Chance	Rajeeb/Raju		
2010	Byomkesh Bakshi	Byomkesh Bakshi		
2011	Baishe Srabon	Surjo		
2012	Bojhena Shey Bojhena	Avik		
2012	Jekhane Bhooter Bhoy	Ranjan Sengupta		
2012	Bapi Bari Jaa	Bishe		
2012	Abar Byomkesh	Byomkesh Bakshi		
2012	Kahaani	Major Arup Basu	Hindi Film	
2012	Bedroom	Ananda		
2013	Asbo Arekdin	Karan		
2013	Meghe Dhaka Tara	Doctor S. P. Mukherjee		
2013	Kanamachi	Abhimanyu Mukherjee		
2013	Aborto	Hari Bose		
2014	Bangali Babu English Mem	Captain Bikram		
2014	Jaatishwar	Bodhisattwa/Bodhi		
2014	The Royal Bengal Tiger	Abhirup Banerjee/Abhi		
2014	Jodi Love Dile Naa Prane	Anish Chatterjee/Sona		
2014	Chaar	Binayak Basu		
2014	Hrid Majharey	Abhijit Mukhopadhyay		
2014	Byomkesh Phire Elo	Byomkesh Bakshi		
2014	Badshahi Angti	Feluda		
2015	Ebar Shabor	Mithu Mitra		
2015	Jomer Raja Dilo Bor	Dev Das		
2015	Rajkahini	Master		
2015	Katmundu	Pablo Bose	25th film	
2015	Abby Sen	Abby Sen		
2015	Har Har Byomkesh	Byomkesh Bakshi		
2016	Monchora	Dibakar Ray		
2016	Bastu Shaap	Arjun Dasgupta/Jijo		
2016	Thammar Boyfriend	Partha/Pat		
2016	Byomkesh Pawrbo	Byomkesh Bakshi		
2017	Bishorjan	Naseer Ali		
2017	Meghnad Badh Rahasya	Kunal Sen		
2017	Chaya O Chobi	Arindam		
2017	Shob Bhooturey	Aniket Sen		
2018	Aami Joy Chatterjee	Joy Chatterjee		
2018	Guptodhoner Sandhane	Subarna Sen/Sona da		
2018	Flat No 609	Arko Mukherjee		
2018	Biday Byomkesh	Byomkesh Bakshi & Satyaki Bakshi (double role)		
2018	Byomkesh Gotro	Byomkesh Bakshi		
2018	Manojder Adbhut Bari	Kandarpanarayan/ Kanu	Special Appearance	
2019	Bijoya	Nasser Ali		
2019	Shahjahan Regency	Samiran Bose		
2019	Tritiya Adhyay	Kaushik		
2019	Durgeshgorer Guptodhon	Subarna Sen/Sona da		
2019	Bornoporichoy	Arka Bhattacharya		
2020	Asur	Bodhisattwa		
2020	Dwitiyo Purush	Surjo		
2020	Switzerland	Shibu Halder		
2021	Dictionary	Ashoke Sanyal	50th flim	
2021	72 Ghanta	Anamro	Released on Chorki	
2022	Abar Bochhor Koori Pore	Arun		
2022	Byomkesh Hotyamancha	Byomkesh Bakshi		
2022	Karnasubarner Guptodhon	Subarna Sen/Sona da		
2022	Agantuk			
2023	Maayakumari	Kanon Kumar & his grandson Ahir		
2023	Fatafati	Bachaspati Bhaduri		
2023	Biye Bibhrat	Shakya		
2023	Raktabeej	IPS Pankaj Sinha		
2023	Kabuliwala	Mini's father		
2024	Shri Swapankumarer Badami Hyenar Kobole	Dipak Chatterjee		
2024	Alaap	Pablo Majumdar		
2024	Babli	Abhi		
2024	Bohurupi	Sumanta Ghoshal		
2025	Grihapravesh	Bodhi Da	Cameo Appearance	
2025	Putulnacher Itikatha	Shashi		
2025	Joto Kando Kolkatatei	Toposmito / Topshe		
2025	Raktabeej 2	IPS Pankaj Sinha		
2025	Deep Fridge	Swarnabha		
2026	Saptadingar Guptodhon	Subarna Sen/Sona Da		
2026	Emperor vs Sarat Chandra	Sabyasachi		

== Television shows ==
- Sa Re Ga Ma Pa Zee Bangla 2024
- Sa Re Ga Ma Pa Zee Bangla 2022
- Sa Re Ga Ma Pa Zee Bangla 2020
- Famously Filmfare Bengali 2019

== Television series ==
- Proloy Asche
- Shomoy
- Banhishikha
- Khuje Beria Kacher Manush
- Sasuri Jindabad (Zee Bangla)

== Telefilms ==
- Bhool
- Mom Ronge Somudro
- Scandal
- Atithi
- Ballavpurer Rupkatha
- Credit Card
- Hotath Megh
- My Sweet Valentine

== Soap opera ==
- Ek Aakasher Niche (Zee Bangla)

== Short films ==
- Ekti Mrityur Pore
- Maya

== Web series ==
- Avrodh: The Siege Within 2 on Sony Liv
