= Anupam Roy =

Indian Bengali singer-songwriter (born 1982)

Anupam Roy অনুপম রায়
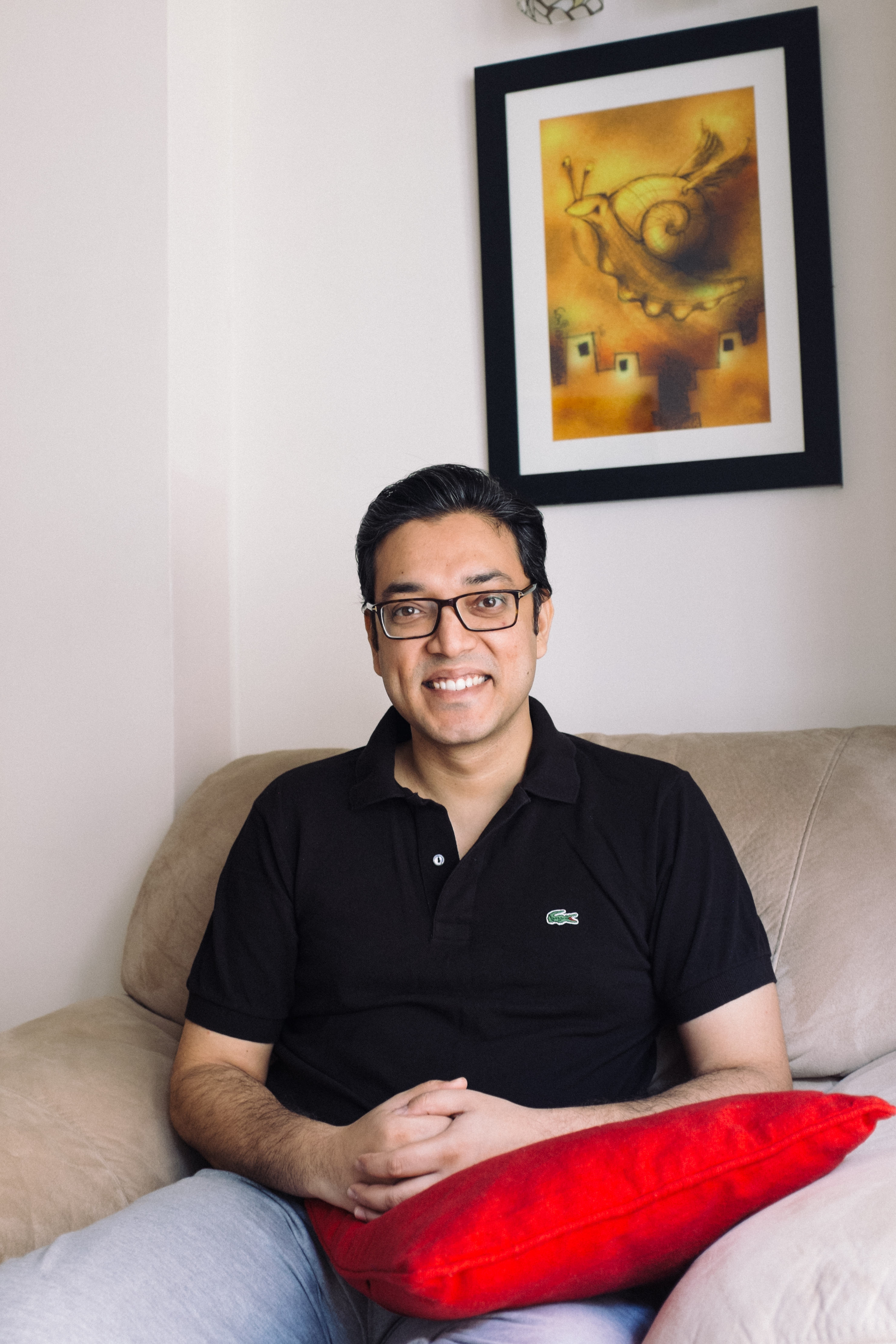
- Roy in 2018

Background information
- Born: 29 March 1982 (age 44); Kolkata, West Bengal, India
- Genres: rock; pop; alternative rock
- Occupations: Singer; lyricist; music composer; poet; columnist; engineer
- Instruments: Guitar, musical composition, songwriting, vocals
- Years active: 2010–present
- Labels: Anupam Roy Creations, SVF, Zee Music Company , Saregama
- Spouses: Piya Chakraborty (m. 2015; div. 2021) Prashmita Paul (m. 2024)

Anupam Roy (born 29 March 1982) is an Indian Bengali singer music director, lyricist, writer, engineer from Kolkata, India. He made his debut with "Amake Amar Moto Thakte Dao" & "Benche Thakar Gaan", which appeared on the soundtrack of the 2010 Bengali film Autograph. Since then, he has gone on to compose, write lyrics and sing for many Bengali films.

In 2015, he made his Bollywood debut, composing the songs and score for Piku. He was nominated for the 61st Filmfare Award for Best Music Director, and won the 61st Filmfare Award for Best Background Score for Piku. Winner of four Filmfare Awards, he is also a recipient of 64th National Film Award for Best Lyrics for the song "Tumi Jaake Bhalobasho".

== Early life ==
Anupam Roy was born on 29 March 1982 in Kolkata, West Bengal, India. He completed his schooling at M.P Birla Foundation Higher Secondary School and subsequently enrolled at Jadavpur University, Kolkata, where he studied Electronics and Telecommunication Engineering. He graduated in 2004 as the gold medalist of his batch. Following his graduation, Roy relocated to Bangalore to work as an analog circuit design engineer for Texas Instruments India. He maintained this corporate role for nearly seven years (July 2004 to March 2011). Despite his professional success in engineering, he continued to write and compose music in his personal time, creating an archive of over 150 songs before his commercial breakthrough. He eventually resigned from his engineering career in 2011 to return to Kolkata and pursue music full-time following the success of his debut tracks in the film Autograph.

== Personal Life ==
Anupam married Piya Chakravorty in 2015. However, the couple got divorced in 2021. Later, he married singer Prashmita Paul in 2024. On 17th August 2026, the couple was blessed with a baby boy.

== Music ==
Two of his songs featured in the Bengali film autograph (2010) by Srijit Mukherji. Roy wrote and composed "Benche Thakar Gaan" (বেঁচে থাকার গান), sung by Rupam Islam & also by himself in another version and "Amake Amar Moto Thakte Dao" (আমাকে আমার মতো থাকতে দাও), which he sang himself. Roy subsequently debuted as music director for the Bengali movie Cholo Paltai (2011). In the same year movies like Baishe Srabon, Rang Milanti released where he continued his work as music director, lyricist and vocalist. In 2012, Hemlock Society released where he worked as music director/lyricist/vocalist. Songs like "Ekhon Anek Raat" & "Amar Mawte" catapulted his success to another level. 2014, marked the release of 4 films where he worked as music director. Songs from Highway and Chotushkone did remarkably well on music charts. "Boba Tunnel" and "Bawshonto Eshe Gechhe" were amongst other songs by Roy.

He debuted in Bollywood in 2015 as a music director, singer and lyricist, Piku, directed by Shoojit Sircar. In 2015, he married his long-time girlfriend Piya Chakraborty. The couple divorced in 2023.

Apart from film music, Roy has four solo albums. He released Durbine Chokh Rakhbona (দূরবীনে চোখ রাখব না), his debut album in 2012 which contains tracks like "Bijli Baati", "Tistaan" and also the original version of "Benche Thakar Gaan". He followed it up with Dwitiyo Purush (দ্বিতীয় পুরুষ) in 2013 with a music video of Adbhut Mugdhota. His third album Bakyobageesh was released in 2014. 2014 also marked Anupam Roy's first Live Concert in Mumbai at the Sarvajanin Durgotsav hosted by Powai Bengali Welfare Organisation (PBWA).

As an independent artist, he and his band released his first English single Second Sex in May 2013. In 2015, he did his first Coke Studio (India) episode. He successfully recreated Moner Manush by Lalon Fakir with an additional Hindi verse written and composed by him.

In 2016, he composed two songs for the Hindi film Pink. In 2017, he composed for the Hindi films Running Shaadi (one song) and Dear Maya.

On 14 February 2017, Anupam released his fourth studio album Ebar Morle Gachh Hawbo. The album consists of songs such as "Amar Shohor", "Oestrogen", "Choitrer Kafon", "Rock n Roll" and "Byatha Lage". This was followed by his fifth album titled "Adrishya Nagordolar Trip" which was released in 2023. This album contain eight songs and which was interpreted by ten artists through eight art forms.

On 2 March 2024, he got hitched to singer-songwriter Prashmita, shortly after his ex-wife married Bengali actor Parambrata Chatterjee.

== Discography ==
Roy's solo albums as a singer-songwriter.

Year	Title	Language	Role
2012	Durbine Chokh Rakhbo Na	Bengali	Singer/writer/composer
2013	Dwitiyo Purush	Bengali	Singer/writer/composer
2014	Bakyobageesh	Bengali	Singer/writer/composer
2017	Ebar Morle Gachh Hawbo	Bengali	Singer/writer/composer
2023	Adrishyo Nagordolar Trip	Bengali	Singer/writer/composer
2026	Byatha Nei	Bengali	Singer/writer/composer

Singles as singer-songwriter.

Year	Title	Language	Role
2011	Amader Swapne MohunBagan	Bengali	Singer/writer/composer
2011	Adhunik?	Bengali	Singer/writer/composer
2011	Tomar Priyo Gaan	Bengali	Singer/writer/composer
2013	Second Sex	English	Singer/writer/composer
2018	Girl in a Bookstore	English	Singer/writer/composer
2018	Regular Guy	English	Singer/writer/composer
2018	Bangladesher Meye	Bengali	Singer/writer/composer
2018	Kalboishakhi	Bengali	Singer/writer/composer
2018	Mithye Kotha	Bengali	Singer/writer/composer
2019	Ish Debashish	Bengali	Singer/writer/composer
2019	Agomonir Gaan	Bengali	Singer/writer/composer
2019	Brishti Theme Gele	Bengali	Singer/writer/composer
2020	Porichoy	Bengali	Singer/writer/composer
2020	Miss Understanding	English	Singer/writer/composer
2020	Bela Boye Jaay (Nirbashoner Gaan)	Bengali	Singer/writer*/composer
2020	Ekla Cholo Re	Bengali	Singer
2020	Aisi Raaton	Hindi	Singer/writer/composer
2020	Bhalo Theko 19	Bengali	Singer/writer/composer*
2020	Michael Vidyasagar Sangbad	Bengali	Singer*/writer/composer
2020	Scattered Lines	English	Singer/writer/composer
2020	Manzil	Hindi	Singer/writer/composer
2021	Ocean Calls My Name	English	Singer/writer/composer
2021	Amar Chalaki	Bengali	Singer/writer/composer
2021	Weekend Love	English	Singer/writer/composer
2021	Manush Bhalo Nei	Bengali	Singer/writer/composer*
2021	Bone Jodi Phutlo Kusum	Bengali	Singer
2021	Morning Star	English	Singer/writer/composer
2021	Mrigonabhi	Bengali	Singer/writer/composer
2021	Happy New Year	Bengali	Singer/writer/composer
2022	Putul Aami	Bengali	Singer/writer/composer
2022	Zindagi Once More	Hindi	Singer/writer/composer
2022	Darun	Bengali	Singer/writer/composer
2022	Ga Chhunye Bolchhi	Bengali	Singer/writer/composer
2022	Mehman	Hindi	Singer/writer/composer
2022	Away From Home	English	Singer/writer/composer
2023	Moner Password	Bengali	Singer/writer/composer
2024	Pujo Pujo Gondho	Bengali	Singer/writer/composer
2024	Amar Sob Kotha	Bengali	Singer/writer/composer
2024	Tu Hi Meri Manzil	Hindi	Singer/writer/composer
2025	Bhalobasi Tomake	Bengali	Singer/writer/composer*
2025	Mitthye Swapno	Bengali	Singer*
2025	Neela Neelabjo Title Track	Bengali	Singer/writer/composer
2025	Kalyani	Bengali	Singer/writer/composer
2025	Dekho Ekhono Tomar Katha	Bengali	Singer*

- Nirbasoner Gaan was written jointly with Chandril Bhattacharya, Anindya Chattopadhyay & Srijato
- Bhalo Theko 19 was a joint composition with Pratyush Banerjee
- Michael Vidyasagar Sangbad was jointly sung with Anirban Bhattacharya
- Manush Bhalo Nei's rap part Written & Sung by Cizzy
- Bone Jodi Phutlo Kusum & Ekla Cholo Re are Rabindra Sangeets
- Bhalobasi Tomake duet with Prashmita Paul
- Mitthye Swapno is composed by Rajib - Mona & Buddhaa M, Lyrics by Asima Dutta

== Filmography ==
=== As Lyricist-Music Director ===
Denotes films that have not yet been released

Roy has worked as lyricist, music director & singer for the following films.

Year	Title	Language	Songs
2010	Autograph	Bengali	Amake Amar Moto Thakte Dao and Benche Thakar Gaan
2011	Chalo Paltai	Bengali	Full album
2011	Rang Milanti	Bengali	Tai Shoi
2011	Baishe Srabon	Bengali	Full album
2012	One Liner	Bengali	Stalled
2012	Teen Yaari Katha	Bengali	Teen Yaari Katha (title song)
2012	Hemlock Society	Bengali	Full album
2012	Laptop	Bengali	Proshner Dawl
2012	Chorabali	Bengali	Chorabali title track (Bangladesh)
2013	Shunyo Awnko	Bengali	Bibhotsho Mawja and Dhushor Chul
2014	Chaya Manush	Bengali	Full album
2014	Window Connection	Bengali	Full album
2014	Highway	Bengali	Full album
2014	Chotushkone	Bengali	Full album
2015	Bela Seshe	Bengali	Obhabe Keno and Shesh Belay
2015	Piku	Hindi	Full album + background score
2015	Family Album	Bengali	Full album
2015	Jomer Raja Dilo Bor	Bengali	Full album
2015	Katmundu	Bengali	Full album
2016	Praktan	Bengali	Kolkata and Tumi Jake Bhalobaso
2016	Khawto	Bengali	Full album
2016	Shaheb Bibi Golaam	Bengali	Full album
2016	Pink	Hindi	Tujhse Hi Hai Roshni and Pink Title Track
2016	Zulfiqar	Bengali	Full album
2017	Black Coffee	Bengali	Full album + background score
2017	Runningshaadi.com	Hindi	Main Faraar Sa
2017	Posto	Bengali	Posto Title Track and Keno Erokom Kichhu Holona
2017	Dear Maya	Hindi	Full album + background score
2017	Arani Takhon	Bengali	Ekbar Phirte Dao
2017	Champ	Bengali	Tumio Chaamp
2017	Maacher Jhol	Bengali	Full album
2017	Projapoti Biskut	Bengali	Ahare Mon
2017	Chawlochitro Circus	Bengali	Full album
2017	Chol Kuntal	Bengali	Chol Kuntal
2018	Pari	Hindi	Full album
2018	Ghare & Baire	Bengali	Tui Ki Kore Dili, Hridoyer Rong & Tara Khoshe Pore
2018	October	Hindi	Tab Bhi Tu
2018	Aatwaja	Bengali	Full album
2018	Drishtikone	Bengali	Full album
2018	Uma	Bengali	Full album
2018	Debi	Bengali	Du Mutho Bikel (Bangladesh)
2018	Rosogolla	Bengali	Rosogolla Anthem
2019	Shah Jahan Regency	Bengali	Ghure Takao & Rondhre Rondhre Paap
2019	Badla	Hindi	Badla Title Track
2019	Vinci Da	Bengali	Full album
2019	Konttho	Bengali	Alote Alote Dhaka & Tomar Jonmodine
2019	Bhootchakra Pvt. Ltd.	Bengali	Full Album
2019	Bornoporichoy	Bengali	Full Album
2019	Sanjhbati	Bengali	Full Album
2020	Dwitiyo Purush	Bengali	Full Album
2021	Prem Tame	Bengali	Jawl Phoring 2.0
2021	Avwanchhit	Marathi	Full Album
2021	Flyover	Bengali	Moner Modhye Bhoy
2021	Bony	Bengali	Full Album
2021	Bob Biswas	Hindi	Mujhe Mujhse Kaun Bachayega
2021	Anusandhan	Bengali	Anek Durer Manush
2022	Bela Shuru	Bengali	Shohage Aadore, Ki Mayay
2022	Projapoti	Bengali	Tumi Amar Hero
2023	Nonte Phonte	Bengali	Title Track
2023	Ardhangini	Bengali	Full Album
2023	Dawshom Awbotaar	Bengali	Full Album
2023	Pradhan	Bengali	Phire Esho
2023	Shastry Viruddh Shastry	Hindi	Natkhattu, Khushi Ke Bahane
2023	Trial Period	Hindi	Background Score
2023	Dhai Aakhar	Hindi	Full Album + Background Score
2024	Alaap	Bengali	Full Album
2024	Ajogyo	Bengali	Full Album
2024	Bohurupi	Bengali	Aj Shara Bela
2025	Killbill Society	Bengali	Nei tumi ager moto, Bhalobese Basona, Sondhey Naame
2025	Bhaggyolokkhi	Bengali	Full Album
2025	Aamar Boss	Bengali	Full Album
2025	Madam Sengupta	Bengali	Full Album
2025	Chandrabindoo	Bengali	Full Album
2025	Dhumketu	Bengali	Full Album
2025	Raktabeej 2	Bengali	Choker Neele
2025	Bhanupriya Bhooter Hotel	Bengali	Tumi ke
2026	Aajo Ardhangini	Bengali	Full Album

=== As Playback Artist ===
Denotes films that have not yet been released

Roy worked only as a playback artist in the following films (for other lyricists & composers)

Year	Film	Language	Composers
2011	Jaani Dyakha Hawbe	Bengali	Indraadip Dasgupta & Neel Dutt
2012	Bedroom	Bengali	Rupam Islam & Allan Ao
2012	Bicycle Kick	Bengali	Joy Sarkar
2012	Om Shanti Om	Bengali	Neel Dutt
2012	Untitled	Bengali	Neel Dutt
2012	Teen Kanya	Bengali	Indraadip Dasgupta
2012	Namte Namte	Bengali	Siddhartha Ray
2013	C/O Sir	Bengali	Raja Narayan Deb
2013	Mukti	Bengali	Raja Narayan Deb
2013	Half Serious	Bengali	Joy Sarkar
2013	Nayika Sangbad	Bengali	Gaboo
2013	Strugglers	Bengali	Silajit
2013	Kolkatar King	Bengali	Tuki
2013	Unnamed	Bengali	Gaboo
2013	Amar Ami	Bengali	Kabir/Shiba
2013	Cross Connection 2	Bengali	Neel Dutt
2013	Promotion	Bengali	Snehasish
2014	Janla Diye Bou Palalo	Bengali	Savvy
2015	Bhitu	Bengali	Ayan Chowdhury
2015	Dwitiyo Ripu	Bengali	Abhijit Chowdhury
2015	Chotoder Chobi	Bengali	Indraadip Dasgupta
2015	Open Tee Bioscope	Bengali	Shantanu Moitra
2015	Amanush 2	Bengali	Arindom Chatterjee
2016	Teenanko	Bengali	Arko Mukherjee
2016	Fan	Bengali	Vishal–Shekhar
2016	Bibaho Diaries	Bengali	Savvy
2017	Mandobasar Galpo	Bengali	Ashok Bhadra
2017	Yeti Obhijaan	Bengali	Indraadip Dasgupta
2018	Sonar Pahar	Bengali	Neel Dutt
2018	Bagh Bandi Khela	Bengali	Jeet Gannguli
2019	Baccha Shoshur	Bengali	Maharshi Dutta
2019	Buro Sadhu	Bengali	Pranjal Das
2020	Feluda Pherot	Bengali	Joy Sarkar
2021	Magic	Bengali	Dabbu
2021	Chal Saathiyaan	Hindi	Ashu Chakraborty
2021	Gyandas Pheriwala	Bengali	Rajkumar Sengupta
2021	Mrigoya	Bengali	Rahul Majumder
2021	Tonic	Bengali	Jeet Gannguli
2022	Abar Kanchanjangha	Bengali	Ashu Chakraborty
2022	Cheene Baadaam	Bengali	Soumya Rit
2022	Bhoy Peona	Bengali	Dabbu
2022	Shrimati	Bengali	Soumya Rit
2022	Save The Mothers	Bengali	Pritam Deb
2023	Aparajitaa	Bengali	Krishnendu Raj Acharya
2024	Adore Theko	Bengali	Amit Chatterjee
2024	Babli	Bengali	Indradip Dasgupta
2024	Tekka	Bengali	Ranajoy Bhattacharjee
2025	Pataligunjer Putul Khela	Bengali	Subhadeep Guha
2025	Bramhaarjun	Bengali	Soumyadip Chakraborty
2026			

==== Documentaries ====
- Warrior Prince (2011) – singer/lyricist/music director.

==== Theatre ====
- Nariyal Paani (2009) – music director/singer/actor.
- Bikele Bhorer Shorshe Phool (2011) – music director/lyricist/singer.

==== Guest Performance ====
- Opare Thakbo Ami (2015) at Zee Bangla Song Connection.
- Ami Banglay Gaan Gai (2021) by Protul Mukhopadhyay, duet with Piya Chakraborty at Uribaba.

=== Jingles ===
- Jibon Gorar Gaan (2012) for George Telegraph S.C. – music, lyrics & vocals
- Ei Samay Theme Song (2012) for Ei Samay Sangbadpatra – music, lyrics & vocals
- Mishti Manei Banchharam (2014) for Banchharam Sweets – music, lyrics & vocals
- Nestle Baby & Me (2015) for Nestle India – music
- Songe Srijit (2015) for Songe Srijit TV Show Colors Bangla – music, lyrics & vocals
- Hero Come Home Safe (2016) for Hero MotoCorp- music & vocals
- Amader Balaram (2016) for Balaram Mullick & Radharaman Mullick – music, lyrics & vocals
- Wild Life Theme Music (2016) for Wild Life Film Festival
- Release The Pressure (2017) for Mirinda India – music
- Nomoshkar Kolkata (2017) for Central (Future Group) – music, lyrics & vocals
- Maa (2017) for (JSW Cement) – music, lyrics & vocals
- Tera Mera Yeh Pyaar (2017) for P.C. Chandra Jewellers – music
- Big Bazaar Pujo Song (2017) for Big Bazaar – music, lyrics & vocals
- Royal Bengal Tiger Cafe (2018) for Royal Bengal Tiger Cafe – music
- Tumi Kothay – Pujo with Pantaloons (2018) for Pantaloons Fashion & Retail – music, lyrics & vocals
- Subhodrishti Title Track (2018) – music, lyrics & vocals
- Missing Stars of Pujo (2018) for Bharti Airtel – music, lyrics & vocals
- Daao Khule Daao (2018) theme song for Behala Notun Dal pujo – music, lyrics & vocals
- Drishtikon (2019) theme song for Tridhara Sanmilani pujo – music, lyrics* & vocals
- It's a magical feeling (2019) for Woodlands Hospital – music, lyrics & vocals
- Chhoto Chhoto Paye (2020) for WBCPCR – music, lyrics & vocals with Iman Chakraborty, Anirban Bhattacharya, Parambrata Chattopadhyay & Rafiath Rashid Mithila
- Jiboner Rong (2021) for Asian Paints – vocals with Lagnajita Chakraborty, Rupam Islam, Lopamudra Mitra
- Brides of India (2021) wedding anthem for Malabar Gold & Diamonds – music
- Shera Sajer Shera Stop (2021) pujo jingle for Shoppers Stop – Vocals
- Pujo Pujo Gondho Akashe (2022) pujo jingle for Reliance Trends - Music, Lyrics & Vocals
- Mukharochak (2023) TVC jingle for Mukharochak - Vocal
- Concreto Uno Amar Choice (2024) TVC jingle for Concreto Cement - Music, Lyrics & Vocals

== The Anupam Roy Band ==
Current members

- Anupam Roy – vocals (2011-present)
- Rishabh Ray – lead guitar (2014-present)
- Kaustav Biswas (Rono) – bass guitar (2014-present)
- Nabarun Bose – keyboards (2011-present)
- Sandipan Parial – drums (2011-present)

Past members

- Sayan Banerjee – lead guitar (2011–2012)
- Subhodip Banerjee – lead guitar (2012–2014)
- Roheet Mukherjee – bass guitar (2011–2014)

== Writings ==
Roy's writings have been featured in various online & print magazines & newspapers. He has helped in the running of an online Bengali portal named Boipara(বইপাড়া) along with visual artist, Samit Roy. Anupam Roy maintains a blog, [Alternative Bangla Print]. Published in print, major little magazines

- The Bengali magazine, Kaurab (কৌরব) published his work, Amader Beche Thaka (আমাদের বেঁচে থাকা), in the open prose category of its August 2010 issue.
- Kaurab (কৌরব) published his work, Paati Lebu (পাতি লেবু), in the open prose category of its August 2011 issue.
- Kaurab (কৌরব) published his poems in its February 2012, 2013 and 2014 issues.
- Kaurab (কৌরব) published his work, Poster, in the prose category of its August 2012 issue.
- Kaurab (কৌরব) published his work, Kabar Sangee (কবর সঙ্গী), in the prose category of its August 2013 issue.
- Kaurab (কৌরব) published his work, Eriyali (এরিয়ালি), in the prose category of its August 2015 issue.
- DaakBangla.com (ডাকবাংলা.কম) publishes his monthly column, Mackie (ম্যাকি).
- DaakBangla.com (ডাকবাংলা.কম) published his work, Lutiye Pora Nokkhotro (লুটিয়ে পড়া নক্ষত্র), in the prose category of its June 2021 issue.
- DaakBangla.com (ডাকবাংলা.কম) published his work, Ja Kichhu Sundor (যা কিছু সুন্দর), in the prose category of its Book Fair 2022 issue.
- Short Cover story on Anandamela 5 July 2025 issue
- Dainy on EiSamay Newspaper 27 April & 4 May 2025 issues.

=== Books ===
- "Sara Raat Kete Jaay Tor Kawtha Bhebe (সারা রাত কেটে যায় তোর কথা ভেবে)" – his first book of Bengali poems was published by Saptarshi Prakashani, in Kolkata Book Fair, 2012.
- "Chhowache Kolom (ছোঁয়াচে কলম)" – second book of Bengali poems, published by Ananda Publishers, Kolkata, 2013
- "Shomoyer Baire (সময়ের বাইরে)" – debut Bengali novel, published by Deys Publishing, Kolkata, 2014
- "Anupamkawtha (অনুপমকথা)" – a collection of 25 essays published in Ebela newspaper, published by Saptarshi Prakashani, in Kolkata Book Fair, 2015
- "Antony O Chandrabindoo (অ্যান্টনি ও চন্দ্রবিন্দু)" – graphic novel, published by Deep Prakashani, Kolkata, 2015 (Illustrations by Sambuddha Bishee)
- "Mon o Mejaj (মন ও মেজাজ)" – third book of Bengali poems, published by Karigor Publishers, Kolkata, 2016
- "Amader Benche Thaka (আমাদের বেঁচে থাকা)" – a collection of short stories, published by Kaurab Prakashani, in Kolkata Book Fair, 2018
- "Anupamkawtha O Onyanyo (অনুপমকথা ও অন্যান্য)" – a collection of essays, published by Karigar Prakashani, Kolkata, 2018
- "Nijer Shawbde Kaaj Koro (নিজের শব্দে কাজ করো)" – fourth book of Bengali poems, published by Deys Publishing, Kolkata 2020
- "Mackie (ম্যাকি)" – a collection of first 10 Mackie columns published in DaakBangla.com, published by DaakBangla & Deys Publishing, Kolkata 2022
- "Bangalore-e Antony (ব্যাঙ্গালোরে অ্যান্টনি)" – graphic novel, published by Deep Prakashan, Kolkata, 2023 (Illustrations by Shuvo Chakraborty)
- "Brisho Boshe Thake (বৃষ বসে থাকে)" – Fifth book of Bengali poems, published by Ananda Publishers (Signet Press), Kolkata 2023
- "Mackie 2 (ম্যাকি ২)" – a collection of rest Mackie columns published in DaakBangla.com, published by Aajkal, Kolkata 2024
- "Cinemay Antony (সিনেমায় অ্যান্টনি)" – graphic novel, published by Deep Prakashan, Kolkata, 2024 (Illustrations by Subham Bhattacharya)
- "Binoyer Brohmohdorshon (বিনয়ের ব্রহ্মদর্শন)" – book of Bengali short stories, published by Deys Publishing, Kolkata 2024
- "Neela - Neelabjo (নীলা-নীলাব্জ)" – book of Bengali short stories, published by Aajkal, Kolkata 2025

=== Newspaper ===
- Anupam was a regular columnist for Bengali newspaper Ebela (এবেলা) from September 2012 to October 2016
- He also writes articles for Pratidin (রোববার)

=== Graphic Novel ===
Roy is the creator of the Bengali graphic novel character Antony. He writes the story and the dialogues for it. Sambuddha Bishee is the illustrator. The first adventure of Antony (Antony o Chandrabindoo) started getting published in Bengali newspaper magazine Pratidin (রোববার) from July 2014 on a weekly basis. In 2022 8 years after publishing Antony's first adventure; Roy brings back him in an online magazine Daakbangla named 'Bangalore-e Antony'. This time the illustration is created by Suvo Chakraborty. In 2023 he starts publishing 3rd Antony Adventure 'Cinemay Antony' in Dakbangla. Illustrated by Subham Bhattacharya.

Year	Book name	Artist	Publisher
2014	Antony O Chandrabindoo	Sambuddha Bishee	Deep Prakashan
2022	Bangalore-e Antony	Shuvo Chakraborty	Deep Prakashan
2023	Cinemay Antony	Subham Bhattacharya	

=== Audio Book ===
- Roy first time recorded his own poems for Storytel in the year 2021. The poems are from his own book Nijer Shawbde Kaaj Koro's 'Raat Series'. With a BGM composed by Prabuddha Banerjee & Sound design-mix by Shomi Chatterjee.
- Neela - Neelabjo (নীলা-নীলাব্জ) Roy's first audio book series from his own YouTube channel. This series of 10 stories are written by Roy himself and the character Neela & Neelabjo played by Ishaa Saha & Somak Ghosh. Premiered from 26 August 2025 with a little title track.

== Single Performances ==
Anupam Roy performed his first ever single concert in September 2019 named 'Bhalobasa Baki Achhe' at Nazrul Manch. After a long overcome phase of pandemic COVID-19 on 3 November 2024 he again set up for his second concert named 'Tarar Moto Jolbo' at Niccopark.

== Other activities ==
Roy has written & directed two short films, Tiebreaker (2009) and Mind Radio (2010), both produced by TIIMMC. He is a gold medal recipient and is a holder of the Bachelor of Engineering degree in Electronics and Telecommunication Engineering from Jadavpur University. He graduated from Jadavpur University in 2004. He used to work for Texas Instruments India, Bangalore as an analog circuit design engineer from 2004 (July) to 2011 (March).

== Acting ==
Roy's career as an actor.

Year	Title	Language	Role	Remarks	Ref
2014	Jaatishwar	Bengali	As himself		
2014	Amartya	Bengali	As Amartya	Short film	
2016	Praktan	Bengali	As himself		
2021	Prem Tame	Bengali	As himself		

== Awards and recognitions ==
- Anandalok Special Jury Award for 'The Most Popular Singer, 2010'
- Heritage Samman For Legendary Personalities, (Best upcoming talent, 2010)
- Bangla Sangeet Award (Anandabazar Patrika) – Best new Lyricist (2010), Best new Song (2010) – Amake Amar Moto Thakte Dao (আমাকে আমার মত থাকতে দাও)
- Big Bangla Movie Awards 2011 – Best Lyricist – Amake Amar Moto Thakte Dao (আমাকে আমার মত থাকতে দাও)
- Zee Bangla Gourab Award 2011 – Best Lyricist – Amake Amar Moto Thakte Dao (আমাকে আমার মত থাকতে দাও)
- Bose Tele Cine Awards (Pulok Bandopadhyay Memorial Award) 2011 – Best Lyricist – Amake Amar Moto Thakte Dao (আমাকে আমার মত থাকতে দাও)
- Star Jalsa Entertainment Award 2011 – 'Agami Diner Star'
- STAR Ananda Shera Bangali Award 2011 – 'Notun Mukh (Best Newcomer)'
- Big Bangla Rising Star Award 2011 – 'Best Singer (Male)' & 'Role Model'
- Anandalok Awards for Best Song 2011 for 'Bariye Daao Tomar Haat (Chalo Paltai)'
- Mirchi Music Awards Bangla 2012 – 6 awards, upcoming lyricist (Ekbar Bawl), best lyricist (jury & popular) for Bengali Films, best film album 'Baishey Sraabon' (jury and popular) and best song "Gobheere Jao"
- Bangla Sangeet Puroshkar 2012 (Anandabazar Patrika & Friends 91.9FM) – Best music director (Baishey Sraabon), Best song (Je Kota Din), Best film album (Baishey Sraabon)
- ABP Ananda Shera Bangali Award 2012 – Music Category
- 12th Tele Cine Awards 2012 – Best male playback for "Ekbar Bawl" (একবার বল) from Baishe Srabon
- Zee Bangla Gourab Award 2012 – Best Lyricist – Bariye Daao & Best Music Director – Baishe Srabon
- IBFA 2012 – Best Singer – "Ekbar Bawl"
- IBFCA 2012 – Best lyricist, music director & singer – all for Baishe Srabon
- Anandalok Best Song Award 2012 for "Ekhon Anek Raat" from Hemlock Society
- Mirchi Music Awards Bangla 2013 – Best song 'Ekhon Anek Raat' & best album Hemlock Society
- 13th Tele Cine Awards (Pulok Bandopadhyay Memorial Award) 2013 – Best lyricist – 'Ekhon Anek Raat'
- ETV Bangla Sangeet Samman 2013 – Best Male Playback – 'Ekhon Anek Raat'
- BFJA 2013 – Best Male Playback – 'Ekhon Anek Raat'
- Ebela – Ami Amar Moto (আমি আমার মত) Samman 2013
- Zee Bangla Gourab Award 2013–14 – Best Lyricist – Ekhon Anek Raat & Best Playback Singer – Ekhon Anek Raat
- 61st Filmfare Award for Best Background Score 2016 – Piku
- Mirchi Music Awards Bangla 2015 – Best Song 'Bondhu Chol' & Royal Stag Make it Large Award
- West Bengal Film Journalists' Association Awards 2017 – Best Music Director – Praktan & Best Lyricist – Tumi Jaake Bhalobasho
- Filmfare Award East 2017 – Best Music Album – Praktan & Best Lyricist – Tumi Jaake Bhalobasho
- Mirchi Music Awards Bangla 2016 – Best Song (Critics Choice) – Tumi Jaake Bhalobasho, Best Album (Critics Choice) – Shaheb Bibi Golaam, Best Lyrics – Tumi Jaake Bhalobasho & Best Music Composer – Tumi Jaake Bhalobasho
- 64th National Film Awards 2016 – Best Lyrics – Tumi Jaake Bhalobasho
- 16th Tele Cine Awards 2017 – Best Lyrics & Best Music Director for Tumi Jaake Bhalobasho
- SRL Award 2018 – "Composer of the Decade"
- Filmfare Awards Bangla 2018 – Best Music Album – Projapoti Biskut
- Mirchi Music Awards Bangla 2017 – Best Lyrics – Keno Erokom Kichhu Holona, Best Album (Listeners' Choice) – Maacher Jhol & Best Album (Critics Choice) – Projapoti Biskut
- 17th Tele Cine Awards 2018 – Best Lyrics for Dawttok
- West Bengal Film Journalists' Association Awards 2019 – Best Music Director – Drishtikone & Best Male Playback Singer – Amar Dukkhogulo
- Mirchi Music Awards Bangla 2018 – Best Song (Listeners' Choice) – Hridoyer Rong & Best Album (Listeners' Choice) – Ghare and Baire
- NABC Film Festival 2019 – Best Music for Uma
- West Bengal Film Journalists' Association Awards 2020 – Best Music Director – Shahjahan Regency
- Tumi Annanya 2021 – Excellence in Women Empowerment through Indian Music
- Filmfare Awards Bangla 2021 – Best Music Album for the film "Prem-Tame"
- WBFJA AWARD 2021 – Best Lyricist for Jawlphoring 2.0 from the film "Prem-Tame"
- TELE CINE AWARD 2022 – Best Male Playback Singer – Aalote Aalote Dhaka from the film Konttho
- TELE CINE AWARD 2023 – Best Male Playback Singer – Sohage Adore from the film Belashuru
- WBFJA AWARD 2024 - Best Male Playback Singer of 2023 - Aami Shei Manushta Aar Nei from the film "Dawshom Awbotaar"
- WBFJA AWARD 2024 - Best Lyricist of 2023 - Alada Alada from the film "Ardhangini"
- Filmfare Awards Bangla 2024 - Best Lyricist for Alada Alada from the film Ardhangini
- Filmfare Awards Bangla 2024 - Best Music Album for the film Dawshom Awbotaar
- TELE CINE AWARD 2024 – Best Music Director for the film "Ardhangini"
