= Abir Chatterjee =

Indian actor (born 1980)

- আবীর চট্টোপাধ্যায়
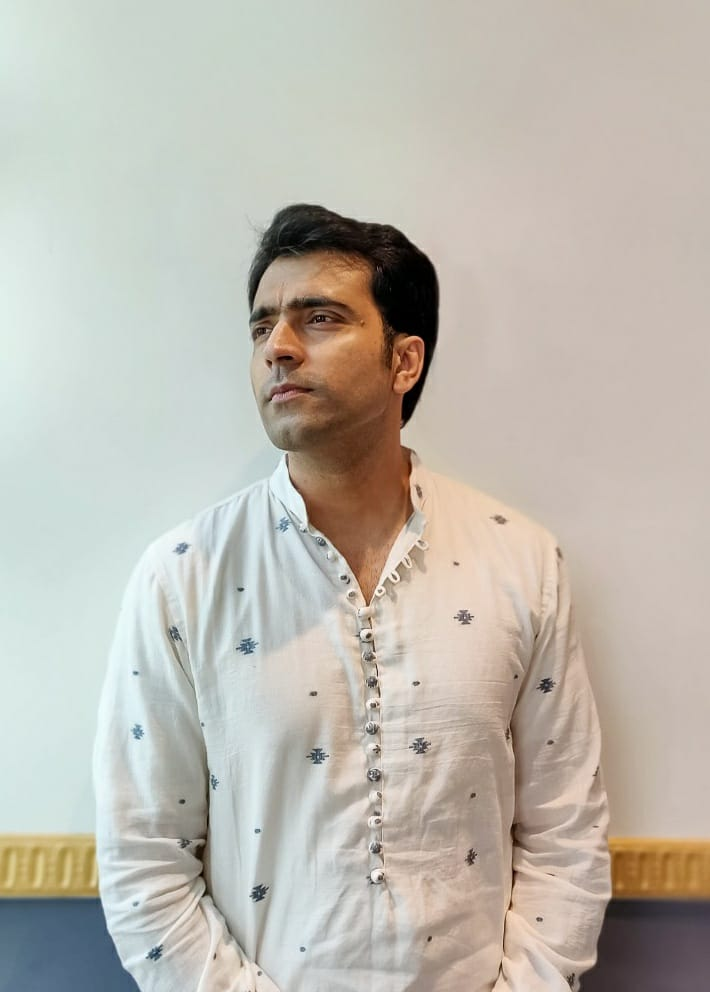
- Chatterjee in 2018
- Born: 18 November 1980 (age 45); Kolkata, West Bengal, India
- Education: Laban Hrad Vidyapith; Seth Anandram Jaipuria College; Goenka College of Commerce and Business Administration; ICFAI University
- Occupations: Actor; television personality
- Years active: 2009–present
- Works: Full list
- Spouse: Nandini Chatterjee (m. 2007)
- Children: 1

Abir Chatterjee (born 18 November 1980) is an Indian actor who mainly works in Bengali cinema. He is the son of theatre personalities Phalguni Chatterjee and Rumki Chatterjee. He started his career with Bengali television and made his debut in Bengali cinema in 2009 as a lead with Cross Connection. He is well known for appearing as famous detective Byomkesh Bakshi in a separate movie series. He is one of the highest-paid actors in Indian Bengali cinema along Jeet and Dev.

He won Best Villain Award for Kanamachi at Zee Bangla Gaurav Awards 2014 and Best Romantic Hero of the Year for Alaap at the Tele Cine Awards 2024. His performances in the critically acclaimed films Shah Jahan Regency, Bishorjan and Tritiya Adhyay have been praised. He has starred in National Award winning films like Bishorjan (2017) as well as commercially successful films including Bojhena Shey Bojhena (2012), Guptodhoner Sandhane (2018), Durgeshgorer Guptodhon (2019), Alaap (2024) and Bohurupi (2024), which are among the highest grossing Bengali films of all time.

== Early life and education ==
He is the son of theatre artists Phalguni Chatterjee and Rumki Chatterjee. He attended Laban Hrad Vidyapith. He then attended Seth Anandaram Jaipuria College for his plus 2. He was granted his B.Com degree from the Goenka College of Commerce and Business Administration and his MBA degree from the ICFAI University, Kolkata branch.

== Personal life ==
Chatterjee married Nandini Chatterjee, his college friend, in 2007. The couple has a daughter named Mayurakshi Chatterjee. He is an avid East Bengal fan. He is highly influenced by Soumitra Chatterjee's performance.

== Media ==
After acting in the 2014 romantic tragedy movie Hrid Majharey, he went on to top the list of Calcutta Times Most Desirable Men of 2014 and 2019.

== Career ==
=== 2000-03: Pre-debut ===
He debuted in the Bengali film industry through soap operas and telefilms. Before his film debut, he has acted in many Bengali soap operas and telefilms including Proloy Asche Ruposhi Bangla, Shasuri Zindabad, Khuje Berai Kacher Manush, Banhishikha, Sudhu Tomari Jonno, Somoy, Ek Akasher Niche and Janmobhumi.

=== 2004-13: Debut and early career ===
Abir Chatterjee made his screen debut in the 2004 independent period drama Robibar Bikelbela, in which he portrays a disillusioned former Naxalite revolutionary in post-Emergency Bengal. But no copies of the film have been found yet and hence it is considered a lost film.

Cross Connection in 2009 marked his film debut in the lead role. In the following year, he made appearance in the role Byomkesh Bakshi in Byomkesh Bakshi directed by Anjan Dutt. In 2011, he acted in the critically acclaimed Baishe Srabon directed by Srijit Mukherji.

In 2012, his first release was Bojhena Shey Bojhena. A cast which ensembled Soham Chakraborty, Mimi Chakraborty and Payel Sarkar, it became a hit. Then he starred in the horror comedy Jekhane Bhooter Bhoy, the romantic drama Bedroom and the romantic comedy Bapi Bari Jaa. Next he reprised his role of Byomkesh Bakshi in Abar Byomkesh. Directed by Anjan Dutt, it served as a sequel of his 2010 film Byomkesh Bakshi.

In 2010, he made his Bollywood debut with Kahaani. With a huge Bengali cast including Vidya Balan, Parambrata Chatterjee, Indraneil Sengupta, Dhritiman Chatterjee, Saswata Chatterjee, Shantilal Mukherjee and Kharaj Mukherjee the film was a box-office success. In 2013, he acted in the cult classic Meghe Dhaka Tara directed by Kamaleshwar Mukherjee. His other released in that year included Asbo Arekdin, Kanamachi and Aborto.

=== 2014-17: Byomkesh Bakshi and critical acclaim ===
He has appeared in many Bengali movies as Byomkesh Bakshi and Feluda. 2014 saw his emergence in a solo leading role in the critically acclaimed film Hrid Majharey by debutant director Ranjan Ghosh. He reprised his role of Byomkesh Bakshi in Byomkesh Phire Elo, the third installment of the Byomkesh Bakshi series directed by Anjan Dutt. It became a box office success and he gained popularity among the people for his portrayal of Byomkesh's character in several films. In the same year he starred in the critically acclaimed film Badshahi Angti in the role of popular fictional detective Feluda. He also had a cameo appearance in the multiple award winning film Jaatishwar. Besides these, he also acted in other films like Chaar, Jodi Love Dile Naa Prane and The Royal Bengal Tiger. The Indian Express said he brought "elegant élan and confidence" to his role in The Royal Bengal Tiger.

In 2015, he portrayed the titular role of Byomkesh Bakshi in Har Har Byomkesh. It marked the maiden installment of a separate series of Byomkesh Bakshi films directed by Arindam Sil. It was also commercially successful just like all the previous Anjan Dutt directorial Byomkesh films. He also acted in the superhit epic historical drama Rajkahini. He also starred in romantic comedy films like Jomer Raja Dilo Bor, Katmundu and science fiction comedy film Abby Sen. He was also present in the mystery thriller film Ebar Shabor.

In 2016, he once again reprised his role of Byomkesh Bakshi in Byomkesh Pawrbo, the second installment of Byomkesh series directed by Arindam Sil. His other releases that year included Bastu-Shaap, Thammar Boyfriend and Monchora. In 2017, he had 4 releases: Shob Bhooturey, Chhaya O Chhobi, Bishorjan and Meghnad Badh Rahasya. Bishorjan won the Filmfare Awards East in six categories and also won the National Film Award for Best Feature Film in Bengali at the 64th National Film Awards.

=== 2018-22: Detective films and further success ===
In 2018, he starred in Byomkesh Gotro, the third installment of Byomkesh series of Arindam Sil. The same year he starred in Biday Byomkesh - first film of another Byomkesh series directed by Debaloy Bhattacharya. It was the sixth installment of Byomkesh film series produced by SVF (the first 3 parts were directed by Dutt, next 2 by Sil and one by Bhattacharya). His constant success with detective films and popularity of the character of Byomkesh Bakshi played by him over the years, earned him huge popularity among the audience. He was also the lead character in the action, mystery adventure thriller film Guptodhoner Sandhane. It was a blockbuster at the box office. His other released that year were Flat No 609 and Aami Joy Chatterjee.

In 2019, he starred in Bijoya with Jaya Ahsan. He also acted in the Srijit Mukherji directorial mega-cast film Shah Jahan Regency. Then he starred with Tritiya Adhyay with Paoli Dam. It won the "Best National Feature Film" and "Best Screenplay Award" at the Expressions Film Festival. He reprised his role of Sona da in Durgeshgorer Guptodhon, the second film in the "Guptodhon franchise" under the banner of SVF. With Jisshu Sengupta he starred in the neo noir crime action thriller Bornoporichoy directed by Mainak Bhaumik.

In 2020 he debuted in Hindi Web Series with Season 2 of the SonyLIV original Avrodh named Avrodh: The Siege Within 2. In the same year he starred in Switzerland with Rukmini Maitra. He was present in the Jeet starrer Asur. He also had a cameo in the Srijit Mukherji directorial Dwitiyo Purush. In 2021 he released only one film - the Bratya Basu directorial Dictionary with Mosharraf Karim and Nusrat Jahan. In 2022, he acted in Abar Bochhor Koori Pore, Byomkesh Hotyamancha and Agantuk. His next release was Karnasubarner Guptodhon. The third installment of "Guptodhon franchise", it became a blockbuster at the box office and became the second highest grossing Bengali film of 2022 and one of the highest-grossing Bengali films of all time.

=== 2023-present: Continued success ===
In 2023 he starred in the Fatafati with Ritabhari Chakraborty. Directed Aritra Mukherjee, it was a box office success and became an unexpected hit at the box office. Next he starred in Raktabeej directed by the duo of Nandita Roy and Shiboprosad Mukherjee. Bases on the true events of 2014 Burdwan blast, the cast included Victor Banerjee and Mimi Chakraborty in parallelly pivotal roles. It became one of the highest grossing Bengali films of 2023. He played the role of Mini's father in Kabuliwala, the adaptation of the famous cult classic "Kabuliwala" written by Rabindranath Tagore. He had several other releases including the Arindam Sil directorial Maayakumari and Raja Chanda directorial Biye Bibhrat.

In 2024, his first release was the satirical action comedy Shri Swapankumarer Badami Hyenar Kobole. It is based on the adventures of Dipak Chatterjee, a fictional detective lost in time. Next he starred in the romantic comedy Alaap with Mimi Chakraborty and Swastika Dutta. It won him the Best Romantic Hero Award at the Tele Cine Awards 2024. The movie became a surprise hit at the box office. His next film the same year was the Raj Chakraborty directorial romantic drama Babli with Subhashree Ganguly. In October 2024, he acted in the Shiboprosad-Nandita directorial Bohurupi. It became a box office success and emerged as one of the highest grossing Bengali films of 2024 and one of the highest grossing Indian Bengali films of all time.

== Television appearances ==
Name of the show	Notes	Channel	Year
Sa Re Ga Ma Pa	Host	Zee Bangla	2020-2021
Sa Re Ga Ma Pa	Host	Zee Bangla	2022-2023
Sa Re Ga Ma Pa	Host	Zee Bangla	2024-2025
Sa Re Ga Ma Pa	Host	Zee Bangla	2025-2026

== Awards ==
Year	Award	Category	Film
2014	Zee Bangla Gaurav Samman	Best Villain	Kanamachi
2017	Star Jalsha Paribar Awards	Best Jodi (with Sohini Sarkar)	Byomkesh Pawrbo
2019	Tele Cine Awards	Best Jodi (with Jaya Ahsan)	Bijoya
2019	West Bengal Film Journalists' Association Awards	Most Popular Actor	Byomkesh Gotro
2021	Zee Bangla Sonar Sansar	Priyo Sodosyo	Sa Re Ga Ma Pa
2022	West Bengal Film Journalists' Association Awards	Best Actor In A Negative Role	Asur
2022	Zee Bangla Sonar Sansar	Priyo Sodosyo	Sa Re Ga Ma Pa
2023	Zee Bangla Sonar Sansar	Priyo Sodosyo	Sa Re Ga Ma Pa
2024	Tele Cine Awards	Best Romantic Hero of the Year	Alaap
2024	Zee Bangla Sonar Sansar	Priyo Sodosyo	Sa Re Ga Ma Pa
2025	Joy Filmfare Glamour and Style Awards Bengal	Man of Style and Substance	
2025	Zee Bangla Sonar Sansar	Priyo Sodosyo	Sa Re Ga Ma Pa
2025	Bengal's Most Stylish Season 2	Stylish Personality Of The Year (Male)	
2025	BFTA Awards	Best Actor in a Leading Role	Babli
2025	TV 9 Bangla Ghorer Bioscope Awards	Best Actor in a Leading Role	Shri Swapankumarer Badami Haynar Kobole

== See also ==
- List of Indian film actors
