= Kalakar Award for Best Actress =

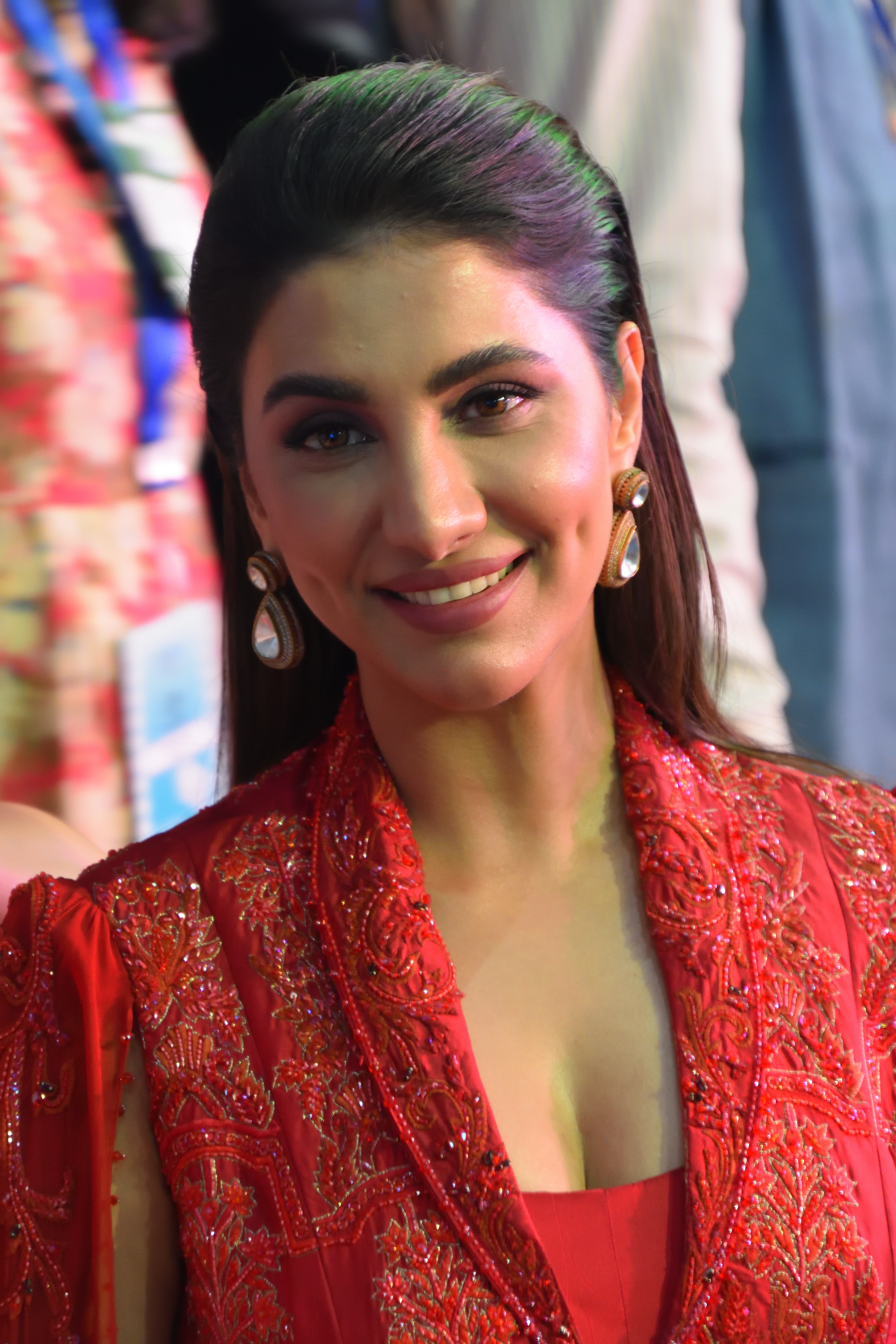
- Rukmini Maitra, the last winner
- Awarded for: Best Performance by an Actress in a Leading Role in Bengali films
- Country: India
- Presented by: Kalakar Parivar Foundation
- First award: 1993
- Final award: 2020
- Currently held by: Rukmini Maitra for Password

The Kalakar Award for Best Actress is presented annually at the Kalakar Awards, by the Kalakar Parivar Foundation for excellence in Bengali films. The award was first given in 1993.

== Superlatives ==
- Debashree Roy and Indrani Haldar are the first recipients and joint winners of this award. Debashree Roy has won it four times. She won the award consecutively for two years twice (1993, 1994) & (2002, 2003).
- Rituparna Sengupta is the most awarded recipient, with 10 wins, and has won the award consecutively for 5 years (2006, 2007, 2008, 2009 & 2010). Additionally, she is the only actress to win both Best Actress & Best Supporting Actress.
- Satabdi Roy is the third most awarded actress, with 3 wins.
- Subhashree Ganguly won the award twice consecutively in 2014 and 2015. She also received the Kalakar Award for Best Rising Actress in 2014 for the film Boss: Born to Rule (2013).
- Churni Ganguly is the only actress awarded for her performance in her debut film, Waarish... (2004).
- Raveena Tandon is notably the only Bollywood actress to have won this award.

== Multiple winners ==
- 10 wins: Rituparna Sengupta
- 4 wins: Debashree Roy
- 3 wins: Satabdi Roy
- 2 wins: Subhashree Ganguly

== Winners ==
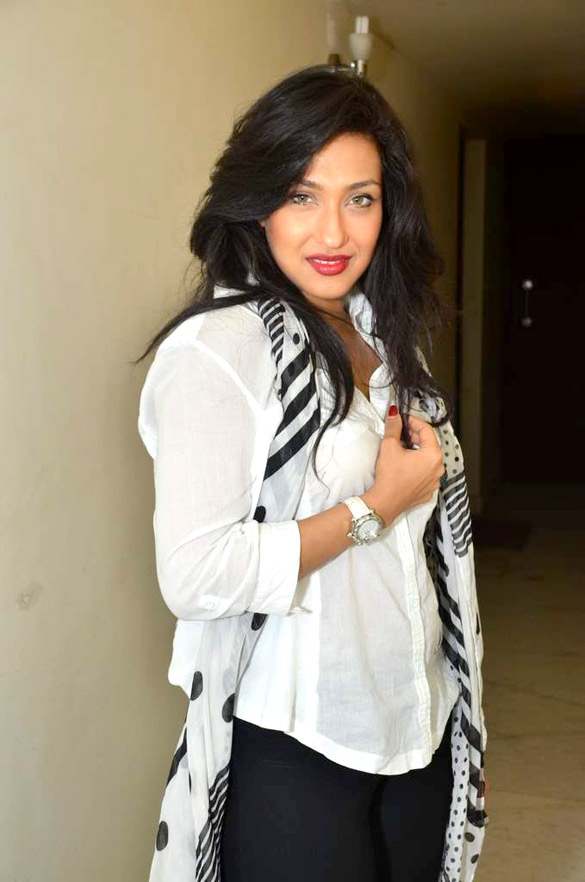
Rituparna Sengupta, Most awarded recipient.

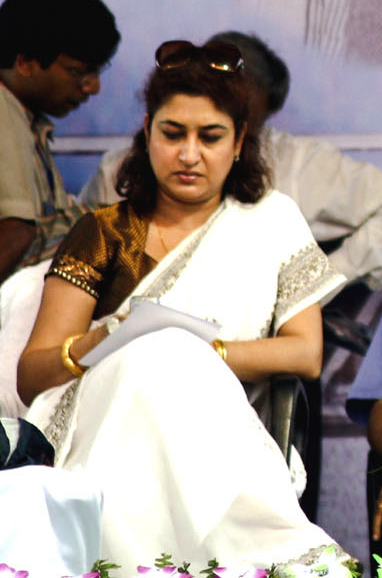
Satabdi Roy has won the award four times.

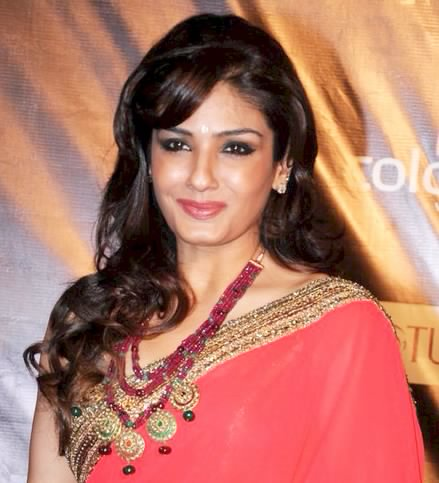
Raveena Tandon won the award for her debut Bengali film Laboratory (2010)

List of winners and nominated work
Year	Recipient(s)	Role(s)	Film(s)	Ref.
1993 (1st) & (2nd)	Debashree Roy		Prem	
1993 (1st) & (2nd)	Indrani Haldar		Tapashya	
1994 (3rd)	Debashree Roy		Sandhyatara	
1996 (4th)	Satabdi Roy	Mamata	Sansaar Sangram	
1997 (5th)	Rituparna Sengupta	Celina Choudhury	Abujh Mon	
1998 (6th)	Roopa Ganguly	Anasuya (Anu)	Yugant	
1999 (7th)	Satabdi Roy	Sundari	Raja Rani Badsha	
2000 (8th)	Rituparna Sengupta	Payel Choudhury	Moner Manush	
2001 (9th)	Rituparna Sengupta	Roopa Ray	Sasurbari Zindabad	
2002 (10th)	Debashree Roy	Sarama	Dekha	
2003 (11th)	Debashree Roy	Kusum/K. Nandy	Silpantar	
2004 † (12th)	Rachna Banerjee	Saathi	Sabuj Saathi	
2004 † (12th)	Rituparna Sengupta	Rajani Daasi	Mondo Meyer Upakhyan	
2005 † (13th)	Churni Ganguly	Medha Chatterjee	Waarish...	
2005 † (13th)	Satabdi Roy	Revati Bhattacharya	Debipaksha	
2006 (14th)	Rituparna Sengupta	–	Dwitiya Basanta	
2007 (15th)	Rituparna Sengupta	Anuradha	Byatikrami	
2008 (16th)	Rituparna Sengupta	Nandita Chatterjee	Anuranan	
2009 † (17th)	Rituparna Sengupta	Brishti/Tilottama	Mon Amour: Shesher Kobita Revisited	
2009 † (17th)	Sreelekha Mitra	Krishnakali Chatterjee	Tolly Lights	
2010 † (18th)	Rituparna Sengupta	Malini/Debi	Aainaate	
2010 † (18th)	Swastika Mukherjee	Koel	Brake Fail	
2011 (19th)	Raveena Tandon	Sohini	Laboratory	
2012 (20th)	Konkona Sen Sharma	Mrinalini Mitra	Iti Mrinalini	
2014 (22nd)	Subhashree Ganguly	Bhoomi	Khoka 420	
2015 (23rd)	Subhashree Ganguly	Bhumika Pratap Chaudhury	Ami Shudhu Cheyechi Tomay	
2016 (24th)	Payel Sarkar	Ria Banerjee	Jomer Raja Dilo Bor	
2017 (25th)	Srabanti Chatterjee	Riya/Chutki	Shikari	
2018 (26th)	Rituparna Sengupta	Runu Biswas	Baranda	
2019 (27th)	Priyanka Sarkar	Roopa	Crisscross	
2020 (28th)	Rukmini Maitra	Nisha Chatterjee	Password	
