= Subhro Bandopadhyay =

Indian poet

Subhro Bandopadhyay (pen name of Subhransu Banerjee) is an Indian poet who writes in Bengali. He won Sahitya Akademi's Yuva Puraskar, (awarded by Govt. of India to young writers of the country) 2013 for his poetry book Bouddho Lekhomala O Onnyano Shraman.

== Early life and education ==
Subhro was born in Kolkata, 1978. He studied Biological Sciences then shifted to Spanish language for his keen interest in literature. He is a polyglot writer who speaks four languages including Spanish and English.

== Work ==
He has authored 5 poetry books, a novel and a biography on Pablo Neruda, all of them in Bengali. His third collection of poems was short listed for the Sanskriti Awards for Literature in 2006. He has received the Ruy de Clavijo scholarship from Casa Asia, Govt. of Spain in 2007. His fourth collection of poems chitabaagh shahor which is written at a residency programme with I Beca Internacional Antonio Machado for poetic creation (awarded jointly by Ministry of Culture, Govt. of Spain and Fundación Antonio Machado in 2008) in Spain the book is published under the title La ciudad leopardo, He translated and made the maiden collection of contemporary Bengali poetry in Spanish which is published in Spain and in Chile. In 2014 the translation of his Bouddho Lekhomala O Onnyano Shraman is published in Spain under the title Poemas metálicos. He along with four editors, edits the magazine Kaurab. He teaches Spanish at Instituto Cervantes New Delhi.
