= LHV =

LHV may stand for:

- Longer Heavier Vehicle, a type of commercial vehicle in the United Kingdom
- Local hidden-variable theory, a hypothetical manifestation of unknown classical physical parameters
- LHV Pank (Lõhmus, Haavel & Viisemann), an Estonian bank
- Lower heating value, a property of a fuel, defined as the amount of heat released by combusting a specified quantity (initially at 25°C or another reference state) and returning the temperature of the combustion products to 150°C
- Laban Hrad Vidyapith, a higher secondary school in Saltlake City, Kolkata, India
- William T. Piper Memorial Airport with FAA LID LHV
