= New age Bengali literature =

The New Age of Bengali literature can be considered to be the phase (starting from the first decade of the 21st Century) when new literary works of a unique genre flowered in the experimental literature scene in West Bengal. The inception of such literary works in this period is based on the "Little Magazine Explosion". New Age Bengali Literature has its lineage in earlier movements like Hungry generation movement, Kaurab Cult, Natun Kabita /New Poetry. Although not directly influenced by any one of these movements, New Age Bengali Literature has been collectively impacted by all of them.
