= Damadol =

- Movie poster
- Directed by: Manoj Michigan
- Produced by: Ajay Jhunjhunwala
- Starring: Samadarshi Dutta; Anindita Banerjee; Saheb Bhattacharya; Saswata Chatterjee
- Music by: Gourab Chatterjee; Harish Lakhmani; Arya Acharya
- Release date: 22 February 2012 (Kolkata)
- Country: India
- Language: Bengali

Damadol is a 2013 Indian Bengali film directed by Manoj Michigan and produced by Ajay Jhunjhunwala.

== Plot ==
The movie consists of three main characters Aditiya, Nikhil and VK. Aditya is guy who dreams of becoming a filmmaker. He desperately tries to fulfill his dream but does not get finances. VK loves a girl but never able to express it to her. Nikhil works in a corporate office and wants to get married. Nikihl's Father arranged his marriage to a girl named Ria. She turned out to be same girl who VK was mad about. Aditiya came up with plan to help VK to get the love of his life. Aditiya meets Papu Bhai using VK's connection as a return for the favour. Papu Bhai loves films and item songs and agrees to finance Aditya's film. Ankita is an air hostess, close friend of Ria and Aditiya's fiancée. Twist starts in the story when their plan back fired.

== Cast ==
- Samadarshi Dutta as Aditya
- Anindita Banerjee as Ankita
- Saheb Bhattacharya as Nikhil
- Gunjan Daryanani as Tanya
- Rajdeep Gupta as VK
- Priyanka as Ria
- Saswata Chatterjee as Papu Bhai
- Ritabhari Chakraborty
- Niharica Raizada as item number

== Soundtrack ==
The Music was composed by Gourab Chatterjee, Harish Lakhmani, Arya Acharya and released by Kaleidoscope Entertainment.

Damadol

Soundtrack album by Gourab Chatterjee Harish Lakhmani Arya Acharya
- Released: 2013
- Recorded: 2013
- Genre: Soundtrack
- Length: 35:17
- Label: Kaleidoscope Entertainment
- Producer: Gourab Chatterjee; Harish Lakhmani; Arya Acharya

Track list
No.	Title	Music	Singer(s)	Length
1.	"Aaj Haowa"	Gourab Chatterjee	Sayak	6:11
2.	"Damadol"	Gourab Chatterjee	Dibyendu Mukherjee	4:10
3.	"Garam Cha"	Arya Acharya	Priya Patidar	4:31
4.	"Megher Marichika"	Gourab Chatterjee	Satrujit Dasgupta	5:53
5.	"Nikhoj Thikana"	Harish Lakhmani	Suyasha Sengupta	4:42
6.	"Path Haralo"	Gourab Chatterjee	Dibyendu Mukherjee	5:50
Total length:				35:17
