= Manoj Michigan =

Indian Film Director

- Born: 1967 (age 58–59); Kolkata, India
- Occupations: Film director, writer, producer & actor
- Years active: 2008–present
- Known for: Hello Kolkata, Damadol, Tritiya Adhyay

Manoj Michigan is an Indian film director, screenwriter, and producer for Bengali cinema. His notable works include films I Reborn (2019), Tritiya Adhyay (2019), Aami Joy Chatterjee (2018), Damadol (2013), and Hello Kolkata (2008). He was the producer of the psychological thriller film 89 (2015).

== Career ==
=== Debut and experimenting with genres ===
Michigan started his career directing the film Hello Kolkata in 2008. The film incorporates four different stories revolving around the theme of "hope for a better tomorrow after a gloomy yesterday". The film was cited as a vibrant drama of many lives in a city where there is hope of a better tomorrow post a stressful yesterday. Reviewing the film The Telegraph stated, "As per four urban couples and their troubled lives looked too telefilm-ish, despite a strong cast of Swastika, Sreelekha, Sudip Mukherjee, Rudranil and Amitabha. The box office-run ended in two weeks.". In an interview with Shoma Chatterji for The Indian Express, Manoj mentioned that Hello Kolkata was released without the minimum of promotion, marketing and less exhibition. It was also one of the reasons for film's failure at the box office.

His 2013 film Damadol, a situation comedy, was delayed in the process of looking for a production house. Released in February, The Times of India noted that "Manoj Michigan got his numbers right this time", recalling the screenplay of Dil Chahta Hai in parts, applauding for a "fresh, young cast, reasonably good and relatable storyline". Michigan summarizes: "The film is how friends stand for each other in the hour of crisis and how they mess up the relationship when a girl comes into the scene is what the film is all about." The film was a box office success.

As per Michigan, he wanted to explore film making and writing variety of genres. After his success with 2013 film Damadol, Michigan went ahead with film 89 where the three central characters had layered roles. The film was shot in Kolkata and parts of North Bengal. Although skeptical about marketing the film, he called the thriller genre as a risky one. His film 89 was a psychological thriller, where 89 as a number held the final clue to the psychological climax. The film went on to receive rave reviews; screened at Abhijaan Film Festival in 2015, Bengali Film Festival held in Dubai between 5–7 February 2015 and also at the Kerala Film Festival held in Trivandrum in late 2014. The audience response in Trivandrum was overwhelming. In an interview the Statesman, Michigan was quoted saying "[In 89], I did not want to show graphic details of murder, or the act of killing but wanted the underlying subtlety of death to come across through the film without making compromises on the edge-of-the-seat, nail-biting suspense that is the essence of a thriller. I hope we have managed to reach close to this goal".

In 2014, Michigan had plans to direct a mainstream film on the sports genre that did not materialise. He went ahead to write and direct another psychological thriller "Aami Joy Chatterjee" (I Am Joy Chatterjee) whose storyline of the film is based on soul travel or spirit walking with specific humanitarian inputs. Released in 2018, the film didn't fare a good outing at the box office, however, received critical acclaim. Its release was deferred and publicity wasn't that much compared to mainstream Bengali films. The film marked itself at the Indian Film Festival of Ireland and Telangana Bengali Film Festival in 2018.

=== 2019 to present ===
Tritiyo Adhyay was Michigan's romantic thriller release in 2019. In a film review by Firstpost, where the film was pointed to be excruciatingly slow in first half, whereas the third part was called "madly rushed". On the contrary, The Times of India noted that "Manoj deviates from the usual thriller formula and smoothly eases into the climax. The only downside is that this pushes the climax into an overly romantic territory." The newspaper called the thriller as "coming of age". The film had its world premiere at Dubai's Bengali Film Festival in November 2018. Michigan won the "Best Director" and "Best Feature Film" award at the 6th Darbhanga International Film Festival.

By the end of 2019, Michigan directed "I Reborn", a silent short film encapsulates the cycle of birth, love and death keeping the life of a young Dom on focus, who earns a living for himself and his ailing father by cremating dead bodies. Michigan conceived the idea of a Dom isolated finding a woman's corpse way back in 2013. He wrote a draft of the screenplay and developed the idea, adding characters to it. The film won at Casttree Golden Film Award, 2020.

== Filmography ==
Year	Film	Director	Producer	Writer	Actor	Notes
2008	Hello Kolkata	Yes		Yes		
2013	Damadol	Yes		Yes		
2015	89		Yes	Yes		
2018	Aami Joy Chatterjee	Yes		Yes		
2019	Tritiya Adhyay	Yes		Yes	Yes	
2019	Miss Man				Yes	
2019	I Reborn	Yes		Yes		
