= Praktan =

2016 Indian Bengali film

- Praktan film-release poster
- Directed by: Nandita Roy; Shiboprosad Mukherjee
- Written by: Nandita Roy
- Based on: Ujaan by Suchitra Bhattacharya
- Produced by: Atanu Raychaudhuri & Windows Production
- Starring: Prosenjit Chatterjee; Rituparna Sengupta; Soumitra Chatterjee; Aparajita Adhya; Sabitri Chatterjee; Biswanath Basu; Manali Dey; Anupam Roy; Surojit Chatterjee
- Cinematography: Gopi Bhagat; Subhankar Bhar
- Music by: Anupam Roy
- Production company: Windows Production House
- Release date: 27 May 2016
- Country: India
- Language: Bengali
- Budget: ₹2 crore
- Box office: ₹8.5 crore

Praktan (Bengali: প্রাক্তন, lit. Former or Ex) is a 2016 Indian Bengali Romantic film directed by Nandita Roy and Shiboprosad Mukherjee and starring Prosenjit Chatterjee and Rituparna Sengupta. It brings back the Prosenjit - Rituparna collaboration 14 years after Pratihinsa (2002). The theme of the film is based on conflict between contentment and sacrifice of married life.

The film opened to a huge reception on 27 May 2016 worldwide. It won the International Film Business Award 2016 for becoming the Highest Grossing Movie of the Year - Bengal alongside films like Kabaali, Sultan, Sairat and Action Hero Biju, at Indywood Film Carnival at Ramoji Film City. The film's music was released by Amara Muzik. Praktan was remade in Bollywood with the title Jalebi.

== Plot ==
Praktan is about Ujaan Mukherjee (Prosenjit Chatterjee) and Sudipa (Rituparna Sengupta), who have moved on in life after a common love for heritage and culture had seen the conservation architect from Mumbai, Sudipa, fall in love with Ujaan, a tour guide and an explorer, as he liked to call himself. But, in the course, life after marriage turned out to be unlike what they had expected leading to their eventual separation.

During a train journey, Sudipa finds herself in a spot where she realizes that Malini and Putul are none other than Ujaan's present wife and daughter. Upset over the same, she clearly demonstrates that she has not completely forgiven Ujaan for whatever happened between them and seems to carry the burden of their memories. Over the 30-odd hours of the train journey, we come across not just a way of knowing how all these passengers spend their time, but also get an insight into the failed marriage of Ujaan and Sudipa. Ujaan joins them at Nagpur after driving down by road to catch the train. He is surprised to find Sudipa in the same coupe as his family. A non-linear approach in a subtle manner is used to shift the focus on and off from the train journey to the relationship between the two individuals, who started off being madly in love, only to see their marriage crumbling in front of their own eyes. They ensure that the focus is more or less only on these two individuals when their past is shown, there is a mention of Ujaan's close friend and Sudipa's parents, but they are never really shown. Even the rest of the family members of Ujaan are barely showcased in an attempt to take us through their relationship curve. Throughout their story, we also get to understand how and what went wrong in the case of their marriage. Beginning with a sense of apprehension and even disgust in a way, it's wonderful to see Sudipa gradually opening up to Malini and acknowledging how wrong she was in her assumption about her. There are many wonderful moments in the film, like the one where an old lady, played by Sabitri Chatterjee, complains to the railway attendant about the AC and other aspects in Bangla-mixed Hindi as her husband, played by Soumitra Chatterjee, humorously points out later. Also, the way Ujaan and Sudipa manage to just about have a soulful discussion about their past and the interaction between Malini and Sudipa right at the end. Apart from Ujaan, Sudipa, and Malini, an old couple, also travelling are a group of musicians - Upal Sengupta, Anindya Chatterjee, Anupam Roy and Surojit Chatterjee - and newlyweds, played by Biswanath Basu and Manali Manisha Dey. All of them come together for a beautiful “Antakshari” sequence in the film. But then, this is essentially the story of Ujaan and Sudipa and their failed relationship. It's wonderful to see how well-etched Malini's character is and she is the one who, in a way, helps bring closure in the lives of both Ujaan and Sudipa.

== Cast ==
- Prosenjit Chatterjee as Ujaan Mukherjee
- Rituparna Sengupta as Sudipa Sen
- Aparajita Adhya as Malini / Molly Mukherjee
- Biswanath Basu as Ajay
- Manali Dey as Ajay's wife
- Soumitra Chatterjee as a train passenger
- Aronnok as a train passenger
- Devlina Kumar as Ujjan's sister
- Nabanita Malakar as Ujjan's sister
- Sudipa Mukhopadhay as Sudipa's friend
- Sabitri Chatterjee as a train passenger
- OronnOnil as a train passenger
- Anupam Roy as himself
- Anindya Chatterjee as himself
- Sneha Das as herself
- Upal Sengupta as himself
- Surojit Chatterjee as himself
- Tania Kar as Ujaan's sister
- Oindrila Saha
- Sudipa Chatterjee as Sumi
- Saswata Chattopadhyay as Sudipa's husband (special appearance)
- Aveepsa Basak as Udita Mukherjee aka Putul, Molly and Ujaan's daughter

== Making ==
- The entire train was created by Nitish Roy, in the NT1 Studios in Kolkata. For the very first time, a train sequence was shot in Kolkata and the team did not have to go to Hyderabad or Mumbai for the same. It was created in such a way that it could open from every side, which gave a scope to shoot easily from whichever angle the directors wanted to. A full research team travelled in the Gyaneshwari Express to take proper notes of the small details that are important to make a set look authentic. “The IRCTC department helped with the other necessary props as the exact props are not available anywhere else, I am really grateful to IRCTC and Shri Debashish Chandra”, said Shiboprosad Mukherjee in an interview. 24 springs were used to bring in the jerking effect that is experienced in a train, which could otherwise be locked.
- The shooting locations followed the exact route of the Gyaneshwari Express. Thus, alongside Kolkata, Mumbai and Nagpur were also principal shooting locations for the film, which added to the authenticity of the train journey, which is 40% of the movie.
- Helicam or drone was used for the first time in Kolkata for a bird’s eye view shot. The word ‘Parachute’ in the song 'Kolkata, Kolkata' made the directors use a drone to show the beauty of the city with shots over the Ganges, the Monument, the Victoria Memorial; it added a mesmerizing effect to the song.

== Release ==
Praktan was released on 27 May 2016 in both the city of Kolkata as well as in all the other major towns and cities of West Bengal at the same time. The film was screened in 90+ cinema theaters in the Greater Kolkata region alone. Besides Kolkata; Praktan was also released to the audience in more than 25 cinema theaters outside of West Bengal(throughout the country) and in 9 theaters in USA, covering almost all the major American cities with a large Bengali diaspora. The film was also screened in two cinema theaters in Canada. Praktan has become the biggest Bengali film release, breaking many earlier records of the film industry. It is among the ten Bengali films from the first half of 2016 to win critical acclaim.

== Box office ==
On the very first day of its release, the film grossed an estimated 25 lakh rupees, becoming the highest-grossing film of the day. Within three days the film made a business of 1 Crore rupees. It was being surmised that the film would be raking in as much as 2 crore rupees after the first week. The film enjoyed significant success overseas also, becoming one of the first Bengali films to nearly earn a total of 5 lakhs rupees. In the opening week itself, the film grossed an estimated earning of 3.6 lakh rupees in the 7 cinema theaters in USA and made approximately 1.02 lakh rupees in Canada.

== Soundtrack ==
The music for Praktan is composed by Anupam Roy and Anindya Chatterjee and the lyrics have been penned by them as well.

Praktan

Soundtrack album by Anupam Roy
- Released: 2016
- Recorded: 2016
- Genre: Feature film soundtrack
- Language: Bengali
- Label: Amara Muzik Bengali
External audio
- Praktan Full Album on YouTube

No.	Title	Lyrics	Music	Singer(s)	Length
1.	"Kolkata"	Anupam Roy	Anupam Roy	Anupam Roy, Shreya Ghoshal	4:42
2.	"Tumi Jake Bhalobasho (Female)"	Anupam Roy	Anupam Roy	Iman Chakraborty	4:49
3.	"Tumi Jake Bhalobasho (Male)"	Anupam Roy	Anupam Roy	Anupam Roy	4:56
4.	"Bhromor"	Radha Raman	Radha Raman	Surojit Chatterjee	3:15
5.	"Moner Guptochar"	Anindya Chatterjee	Anindya Chatterjee	Anindya Chatterjee	4:43

== Awards and nominations ==
Award	Category	Recipient(s)	Result
64th National Film Awards	National Film Award for Best Lyrics	Anupam Roy for Tumi Jaake Bhalobasho	Won
64th National Film Awards	National Film Award for Best Female Playback Singer	Iman Chakraborty for Tumi Jaake Bhalobasho	Won
Filmfare Awards East	Filmfare Award for Best Film - Bengali	Praktan	Nominated
Filmfare Awards East	Filmfare Award for Best Director - Bengali	Nandita Roy; Shiboprosad Mukherjee	Nominated
Filmfare Awards East	Filmfare Award for Best Actress - Bengali	Rituparna Sengupta	Nominated
Filmfare Awards East	Filmfare Award for Best Actress (Critics) - Bengali	Rituparna Sengupta	Won
Filmfare Awards East	Filmfare Award for Best Supporting Actress - Bengali	Aparajita Adhya	Won
Filmfare Awards East	Filmfare Award for Best Music - Bengali	Anupam Roy; Anindya Chatterjee	Won
Filmfare Awards East	Filmfare Award for Best Lyrics - Bengali	Anupam Roy for Tumi Jake Bhalobasho	Won
Filmfare Awards East	Filmfare Award for Best Playback (Male) - Bengali	Surojit Chatterjee for Bhromor	Nominated
Filmfare Awards East	Filmfare Award for Best Playback (Female) - Bengali	Shreya Ghoshal for Kolkata	Nominated
Filmfare Awards East	Filmfare Award for Best Playback (Female) - Bengali	Iman Chakraborty for Tumi Jake Bhalobasho (Female)	Won
Filmfare Awards East	Filmfare Award for Best Dialogue - Bengali	Shiboprosad Mukherjee	Nominated
Mirchi Music Awards Bangla 2016	Film Song of the year - Critic's Choice	Anupam Roy; Iman Chakraborty for Tumi Jake Bhalobasho (Female)	Won
Mirchi Music Awards Bangla 2016	Film Song of the year	Anupam Roy; Shreya Ghoshal for Kolkata	Nominated
Mirchi Music Awards Bangla 2016	Film composer of the year	Anupam Roy for Tumi Jake Bhalobasho	Won
Mirchi Music Awards Bangla 2016	Film lyricist of the year	Anupam Roy for Tumi Jake Bhalobasho	Won
Mirchi Music Awards Bangla 2016	Film lyricist of the year	Anupam Roy for Kolkata	Nominated
Mirchi Music Awards Bangla 2016	Film upcoming female vocalist of the year	Iman Chakraborty for Tumi Jake Bhalobasho (Female)	Nominated
