= Bakyobageesh =

Studio album by Anupam Roy
- Released: August 11, 2014 (Re-released on March 29, 2017)
- Studio: Sonic Solution
- Length: 32:34
- Language: Bengali
- Label: Anupam Roy Creations, Girona Entertainment (India), Girona Bangladesh (Bangladesh)

Bakyobageesh (বাক্যবাগীশ) is the third solo album by Indian singer-songwriter Anupam Roy. Girona Entertainment released this album on Durga Puja and Eid of 2014 in Kolkata and Dhaka. Later on 2017, Anupam Roy re-released this album with Anupam Roy Creations label.

== Track listing ==
All songs sung, composed and written by Anupam Roy.

Tracklist
No.	Title	Length
1.	"Chaka"	3:41
2.	"Je Shawmajey"	4:29
3.	"Babu Re"	4:53
4.	"Bakyobageesh" (Title Track)	4:10
5.	"Ghawrkuno Ghash"	3:17
6.	"Maatir Rawng"	4:32
7.	"Deshlai Bakshow"	3:46
8.	"Rajprasader Bondee"	3:46
Total length:		32:34

== Personnel ==
Music produced by The Anupam Roy Band

- Anupam Roy – Singer-songwriter
- Sandipan Parial – Drums
- Nabarun Bose – Keyboards and Backing Vocals
- Roheet Mukherjee – Bass
- Subhodip Banerjee – Guitar
- Shomi Chatterjee – Mixed and mastered

Additional musicians:

- Sanjoy Das – Khamak (Babu Re)
- Rohan Roy – Violin (Ghawrkuno Ghash and Rajprasader Bondee)
- Joy Nandi – Tabla (Maatir Rawng)
