= Avrodh: The Siege Within =

Indian military drama web-television series

- Based on: 2016 Uri attack Indian Line of Control strike India's Most Fearless by Shiv Aroor and Rahul Singh
- Written by: Harmanjeet Singha; Sudeep Nigam; Abhishek Chatterjee; Aadhar Khurana
- Directed by: Raj Acharya
- Composer: Nirmal Pandya
- Country of origin: India
- Original language: Hindi
- No. of seasons: 2
- No. of episodes: 18

Production
- Production location: India
- Cinematography: Shanu Singh Rajput
- Running time: 23–25 minutes
- Production companies: Applause Entertainment; Irada Entertainment; Mehra Entertainment

Original release
- Network: SonyLIV
- Release: 30 July 2020 – 23 June 2022

Avrodh: The Siege Within is an Indian Hindi-language military drama streaming television series which premiered on SonyLIV on 31 July 2020. The series, directed by Raj Acharya and produced by Applause Entertainment, Irada Entertainment and Mehra Entertainment, is a retelling of the 2016 Uri attack and the strike by Indian forces across the Line of Control. It is based on a chapter from the book India’s Most Fearless by Shiv Aroor and Rahul Singh. A standalone sequel, titled Avrodh: The Siege Within 2, was released in June 2022.

== About ==
Avrodh is based on the chapter "We Don’t Really Know Fear" from Shiv Aroor and Rahul Singh's India's Most Fearless. The first seven episodes of the nine-part series delve into the planning of the strike, while the last two cover the strike itself. Each episode has an effective runtime of 23 to 25 minutes. While the planning continues at the highest levels of government in New Delhi, the mission is kept secret from even the senior most ministers. The story covers the death of a militant leader, Burhan Wani, and the aftermath, the functioning of militant and terrorist groups in Jammu and Kashmir, Pakistan's involvement in cross border attacks, international pressure, and even the domestic bureaucratic angle and how journalists fit into the picture. The weapons that were part of the alleged cross-border strike is seen, including M4A1s, Galils and TAR-21s.

=== Promotion ===
Promotion of the web-series was done though a trailer showcasing battle scenes and important decisions being taken in the halls of power at Raisina Hill. Extensive digital promotion took place, including a virtual press conference and social media promotion. Along with promotion on The Kapil Sharma Show.

== Cast ==
- Amit Sadh as Major Videep Singh, team leader (Para SF)
- Vikram Gokhale as Prime Minister, based on Narendra Modi
- Neeraj Kabi as NSA Shailesh Malviya, based on Ajit Doval
- Darshan Kumaar as Major Raunaq Gautam (Bihar Regiment)
- Ananth Narayan Mahadevan as Satish Mahadevan
- Madhurima Tuli as Journalist Namrata Joshi
- Nikhil Sangha as Pankaj Kumar, Namrata's boss
- Shehzad Shaikh as Sarthak Srivastav, Namrata's boyfriend
- Anil George as Abu Hafeez, mastermind of the Uri attack
- Umar Sharif as Wahab
- Pavail Gulati as Major Rishabh Sood (Dogra Regiment)
- Adarsh Balakrishna as Racy
- Arif Zakaria as Ali Raza Khan
- Mir Sarwar as Fakhruddin Rasheed
- Mohommed Ali Shah as Captain Irrfan Khan
- Bikramjeet Kanwarpal as Colonel Ajay Saxena (Para SF)
- Mohit Chauhan as Colonel B.K. Rastogi (Dogra Regiment)
- Vineet Singh as Captain A.P. Mahesh Jagtap
- Iqbal Singh Singha as DGMO Lt.General Singha, based on Ranbir Singh
- Deepak Kriplani as Navy Chief Chawla
- Namit as Air Chief Marshal Deo
- Shiladitya Banerjee as Lt.General Anil Dua
- Meghana Kaushik as Niharika
- Praveena Deshpande as Sunita Bharadwaj
- Adil Pala as Adil (Terrorist 1)
- Moin Imtiaz Ganai as Moin (Terrorist 2)
- Sawar Raja as Sawar (Terrorist 3)
- Mark Bennigton as Bob Terry
- Prahan Rao as Captain Chirag Malhotra
- Saurabh Dubey as Rajesh Chauhan
- Sonel Singh as Doctor Gayatri
- Syed Fahad Andrabi as Shoaib
- Vivek Sangotra as Momin
- Sandeep Verma as Sartaj

Season 2

- Sanjay Suri
- Abir Chatterjee
- Mohan Agashe
- Ananth Mahadevan
- Aahana S Kumra
- Rajesh Khattar
- Karan Thakur
- Arif Zakaria
- Adil Pala
- Umar Nasir

== Reception ==
=== Critical reception ===
Deepa Alexander of The Hindu gave Avrodh a positive review, saying that there are ample reasons to watch the web-series. Arushi Jain, writing for the Indian Express, described it as "a retelling, sans any jingoistic and provocative dialogues or scenes", of how the Uri attack was avenged, which makes it "an interesting watch" unspoiled by patriotic excesses. India Today's review calls Avrodh "a well-rounded series", with both the "guns and the glory" as well as the "facts". Without being "hyper-nationalistic", Avrodh manages to showcase the complexities that went into the planning of the strike, including how terrorist groups function, the backing from ISI, international pressure and a plethora of other aspects. Sreeparna Sengupta wrote in her Times of India review that "the planning, execution and training for the mission are shown with meticulous detailing". Sengupta also wrote that the cast pulls of a strong performance and while the narrative is predictable, "there are enough twists and turns in Avrodh that make it a gripping watch". Shreya Paul in the Firstpost wrote that Avrodh is a retelling of India's retaliation to the Uri attack, without "unnecessary excesses". Nandini Ramnath wrote in Scroll.in that "the script is straight out of a government dossier". AdGully wrote that Avrodh "is this story behind how India shrugged off its indecisiveness". Film Companion wrote that life in Kashmir is depicted well, however the show "feels like propaganda", "confuses love for India with indifference for human life" and questioned what the show would mean for Kashmiris without 4G internet. Koimoi felt that more could have been done with Avrodh, and as far as it being propaganda or not, "decide for yourself". Thandora Times said the series is a must watch, whereas a Mashable review called Avrodh a "piece of crap" and an "abysmally bad piece of propaganda".
