= Hello Kolkata =

- Directed by: Manoj Michigan
- Produced by: Sandip Agarwal
- Starring: Swastika Mukherjee; Amitabha Bhattacharya; Sreelekha Mitra; Sudip Mukherjee; Rudranil Ghosh
- Music by: Abhijit Bose
- Release date: 22 August 2008
- Country: India
- Language: Bengali

Hello Kolkata (Bengali: হ্যালো কলকাতা) is a 2008 Bengali film directed by Manoj Michigan.

== Plot ==
The film explores the relationship of 4 couples. Raima, married to Pratik, has reached a critical phase in her marriage because he, an alcoholic, tortures her with physical and mental violence. Pratik is a BPO manager and much though Raima tries to hold on because of their daughter, her patience is almost running out. Partha, branch manager in an insurance firm, is married to Sheila. While Partha places his corporate team under constant stress by reason of his ruthless ambitions, Sheila fails to cope with the reality of her inability to conceive. Anjali, a BPO Team Leader working under Pratik, is about to marry Rahul (Indrajeet), an IT professional. Rahul's ambition is to reach the US for better prospects. His sudden decision to switch over to a job in Bangalore pushes the relationship to a crisis, driving the engagement to breaking point. Animesh, an insurance executive in a private firm, always fails to reach his sales target. He fails to meet the rising financial demands his wife Geeta and son Nayan place on him. The family is headed towards a grave disaster until hope makes its presence felt at the end of the dark tunnel.

== Cast ==
- Swastika Mukherjee as Raima
- Amitabh Bhattacharjee as Pratik
- Sreelekha Mitra as Sheila
- Sudip Mukherjee as Partha
- Rudranil Ghosh as Animesh
- Indrajeet Chakraborty as Rahul
- Maitreyee Mitra as Anjali
- Samapika Debnath as Geeta
- Zubeen Garg performed the song "Alo Ar Adharer Mugdhota" for this movie.
- Amodini Roy as Ashi
