= Encrypted (TV series) =

Indian web series

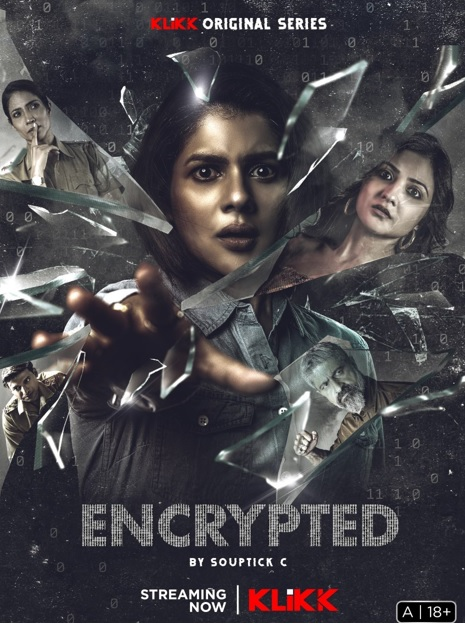
- Genre: Suspense & Thriller
- Story by: Rudrashis Roy
- Directed by: Souptick C
- Starring: Payel Sarkar, Richa Sharma, Aishwarya Sen, Amitabh Acharya, Rana Basu Thakur, Rana Mukherjee
- Music by: Aamlaann Chakraabarty
- Country of origin: India
- Original language: Bengali
- No. of seasons: 1
- No. of episodes: 5

Production
- Producer: Ranieeta Dash
- Cinematography: Ripon Hossain

Original release
- Network: Klikk
- Release: 28 June 2022

Encrypted is a 2022 Bengali language psychological thriller web series written and directed by Souptick C. The main cast in the web series is Payel Sarkar, Aishwarya Sen, Richa Sharma, Amitabh Acharya, Rana Mukherjee and Rana Basu Thakur. The music is composed by Aamlaann Chakraabarty and Ripon Hossain is the cinematographer.

== Plot ==
The life of two sisters, Taniya and Diya, is the subject of the novel Encrypted. Taniya is addicted to drugs and is in desperate need of money to buy narcotics. She learned about the malicious Dark Dare programme. People are forced to take on dangerous duties in exchange for money or fantastic benefits. She engages in activities and becomes embroiled in a minister's murder plot as a result of her attempts to satisfy her addiction. After being fatally tortured by police after being captured, she kills herself.

Diya, her older sister, enters to explain her sister's unexpected death. She finds how the Dark Dare app has harmed the lives of many youngsters, including her sister, and is helped in her search by ACP Hema Singh, the investigating police officer, and reporter Sohag. Diya learned after further investigation that her sister was a victim of a sophisticated scheme. She decided to get revenge for the death of her sister.

== Cast ==
- Payel Sarkar
- Richa Sharma
- Aishwarya Sen
- Amitabh Acharya
- Rana Basu Thakur
- Arpita Das
- Rana Mukherjee
- Indranil De
- Surjendra Bagchi

== Episodes ==
No.	Title	Directed by	Original release date
1	"Enter"	Souptick C	28 June 2022
Taniya, a drug user in college, is abruptly taken into custody. Diya, a Siliguri native, succeeds in her job interview with a major software developer. ACP Hema Singh, a severe officer, and Gopichand, her subordinate, question Taniya. Taniya comes to the realisation that the reason she was detained was far more evil than she had anticipated.
2	"Space"	Souptick C	28 June 2022
Hema mockingly requests Taniya to reveal the true motive for the crime. Taniya agrees to recount her ordeal after she manipulates her desperate want for narcotics. She was forced to complete strange chores by the Dark Dare app due to her excruciating need for cash to acquire narcotics. All of his system is being watched by a cloaked mystery man. The task was playful when it first began, but it gradually began pushing her to the brink.
3	"Control"	Souptick C	28 June 2022
Inside the prison, Taniya suffers from severe depression. In the office elevator, Diya encounters a dubious man who quickly inserts something inside her purse. Hema puts pressure on Taniya and forces her confess her final task, which uncharacteristically links her to the minister's death even though she was oblivious at the time the final literary nail was driven into her coffin.
4	"ALT"	Souptick C	28 June 2022
Gopichand and Hema stop by Ergonomic Solution to learn more about the victim who was killed. Diya, who had just learned of the recent murder of the man from the lift, saw both of the officers. Inspector Rajat is abruptly fired from the case by Hema.
5	"Delete n Re-Start"	Souptick C	28 June 2022
The unidentified man reappears. When Diya meets Sohag, she presents her with the damning proof she possesses. Diya is abducted on the way home, but Taniya's prior good deeds helped save her today. Hema and Diya find the car and investigate an odd series of interactions.

== Reception ==
Netseries gave it 4.7 rating out of 5. While Binged gave it 4.7 out of 10 ratings.

== Soundtrack ==
1. Encrypted (Original Score from the series)

No.	Title	Singer(s)	Length
1	Bhorsha Rekho	Abhijit Burman, Siddhartha Roy, Boidurya	4:02
		Total Length	4:02
