= Proloy Asche =

- Poster
- Genre: Action, Thriller
- Created by: Raj Chakraborty Productions
- Directed by: Raj Chakraborty
- Starring: See left
- Composer: Indradeep Dasgupta
- Country of origin: India
- Original language: Bengali
- No. of seasons: 1
- No. of episodes: 50

Production
- Producer: Raj Chakraborty
- Production location: Kolkata
- Running time: Approx. 43 minutes

Original release
- Network: Sananda TV
- Release: 25 May – 2 September 2011

Proloy Asche (storm approaching) was an Indian Bengali language action thriller television show and produced and directed by Raj Chakraborty. This 50-day mini series had an ensemble cast consisting of Abir Chatterjee, Paran Bandopadhyay and Sayani Ghosh in lead roles. The show aired at 9.30pm from Monday to Friday on Sananda TV.

== Plot summary ==
It is based on a contemporary subject, which has a social and political angle to it. It is about Proloy, a common man, who is not visible to anyone. He protests against injustice and evil.

== Cast ==
- Abir Chatterjee
- Paran Bandopadhyay
- Abhimanyu Mukherjee
- Kharaj Mukherjee
- Saayoni Ghosh
- Supriyo Dutta
- Shankar Chakraborty
- Padmanabha Dasgupta
- Damini Benny Basu as Roopa

== Development ==
Raj Chakraborty clarified the series would wake-up call for people who are too scared to speak up against injustice. The series have been shot on a Red camera, not like a TV series. Popular actor Abir Chatterjee have been roped to play a tough-talking cop. Veteran actor Paran Banerjee, story-writer Abhimanyu Mukherjee and Sayani Ghosh have been roped to enact supporting roles. Supriyo Dutt have been signed to portray the role of the antagonist.
