= Thammar Boyfriend =

2016 film

- Directed by: Anindya Ghosh
- Written by: Anindya Ghosh
- Produced by: Kan Singh Sodha
- Starring: Abir Chatterjee, Sabitri Chatterjee
- Cinematography: Supriyo Dutta
- Edited by: Sujay Datta Ray
- Release date: 18 November 2016
- Running time: 123 minutes
- Country: India
- Language: Bengali

Thammar Boyfriend is a 2016 Indian Bengali comedy film directed by Anindya Ghosh and stars Abir Chatterjee, Sabitri Chatterjee, and Arunima Ghosh. The film was released theatrically on 18 November 2016.

== Synopsis ==
Nandini is a wealthy and lonely aged woman who finds love in the much younger Partho, much to the chagrin of her adult son and daughter.

== Cast ==
- Abir Chatterjee as Partho
- Sabitri Chatterjee as Nandini
- Arunima Ghosh as Rini
- Dolon Roy as Ratna
- Sudipa Basu as Neeta
- Biswajit Chakraborty
- Supriyo Dutta
- Lama Halder
