= Tritiya Adhyay =

2019 Bengali language romantic thriller film

- Official poster
- Directed by: Manoj Michigan
- Produced by: Vivek Rungta; Raghavendra Rungta
- Starring: Abir Chatterjee; Paoli Dam
- Cinematography: Supriyo Dutta
- Edited by: Sanglap Bhowmik
- Music by: Arin Prosenjitjit Das
- Production company: Pushprekha International
- Release date: 8 February 2019
- Country: India
- Language: Bengali

Tritiya Adhyay also referred to as Tritiyo Adhyay is a Bengali romantic thriller, directed by Manoj Michigan and starring Abir Chatterjee and Paoli Dam. The film was released on 8 February 2019. At the Darbhanga International Film Festival, the movie won the Best National Feature Film and the Best Screenplay Award at the Expressions Film Festival.

== Plot ==
Kaushik (played by Abir), a sports teacher, and Shreya (played by Paoli), a botanist, meet after a gap of many years. What follows is a dark romantic thriller, giving the audience a glimpse of why the protagonists had ended their relationship years ago, their reunion in the present, and the possible (or not) future.

== Cast ==
- Abir Chaterjee as Kaushik
- Paoli Dam as Shreya
- Sourav Das
- Arunima Halder
- Abhijit Roy

== Release ==
The official trailer of the film was released by Pushprekha International on 20 December 2018.
