= Avrodh: The Siege Within 2 =

2022 Indian TV series

- Genre: Military drama, Espionage
- Based on: India's Most Fearless 2 by Shiv Aroor and Rahul Singh
- Written by: Brijesh Jayrajan; Sudeep Nigam
- Directed by: Raj Acharya
- Starring: Abir Chatterjee; Vijay Krishna; Vikram Gokhale; Neeraj Kabi; Anant Mahadevan; Rajesh Khattar; Sanjay Suri; Aahana Kumra
- Country of origin: India
- Original language: Hindi

Production
- Production location: India
- Production companies: Applause Entertainment; Juggernaut Productions

Original release
- Network: SonyLIV
- Release: 4 June 2022

Avrodh: The Siege Within 2 is an Indian Hindi-language military drama espionage streaming television series which premiered on SonyLIV on 24 June 2022. It was directed by Raj Acharya, and stars Abir Chatterjee in the lead role. The series is a standalone sequel to Avrodh: The Siege Within. It is based on operations conducted by the Indian Army to stop terrorist attacks and spread of fake notes, eventually leading to the implementation of demonetisation. The series is a fictionalised retelling of the chapter, ‘Just tell me when to begin Sir’, from the book India’s Most Fearless 2, written by Shiv Aroor and Rahul Singh.

== Plot summary ==
Pradeep Bhattacharya is an Income Tax officer, as well as a captain in the Indian Army. Conspirators in Pakistan try to cause terrorist attacks, activate separatist groups, and spread counterfeit currency in India. Pradeep, along with the help of his colleagues and the Indian government, stop the terrorist attacks. However, the fake notes have already spread on a large scale. So, the Prime Minister decides to demonetise notes of denomination ₹500 and ₹1000.

== Cast ==
- Abir Chatterjee as Captain Pradeep Bhattacharya, Para (Special Forces)
- Vijay Krishna as Captain Imtiaz Ahmed, Para (Special Forces)
- Mohan Agashe as Prime Minister, based on Narendra Modi
- Neeraj Kabi as National Security Advisor Shailesh Malviya
- Anant Mahadevan as Satish Mahadevan
- Rajesh Khattar as General Akram Aziz, Pakistan Army
- Karan Thakur as Captain Farooq Khan, Pakistan Army
- Sanjay Suri as Prof. Ehsan Waziri, a businessman and the mastermind behind the plans
- Aahana Kumra as Waziri's spy in India

== Production ==
The web series is a fictionalised retelling of the chapter, ‘Just tell me when to begin Sir’, from the book India’s Most Fearless 2, written by Shiv Aroor and Rahul Singh. Directed by Raj Acharya and produced by Applause Entertainment in association with Juggernaut Productions, the story is written by Brijesh Jayrajan and Sudeep Nigam. It released on 24 June 2022. It is a standalone sequel to Avrodh: The Siege Within, which is based on the 2016 Uri terrorist attack and the subsequent surgical strikes.

== Critical reception ==
The Times of India said that the series makes for an intense watch with its thrilling action, and praised the cast. Hindustan Times commented that Avrodh: The Siege Within 2 "is a series that tries really hard to be gripping but is hurt by lack of subtlety and some questionable production values." India Today praised the cinematography and background score, but termed the plot as predictable. Scroll.in lauded the action, but felt that the plot did not offer anything different. Telegraph India commended Abir Chatterjee's performance, but criticised the lack of thrill and human element. Koimoi gave the film 2.5 stars out of 5, and commented, "Things do get interesting partly but that doesn't negate the questionable factors."
