= Payel Sarkar =

Indian actress

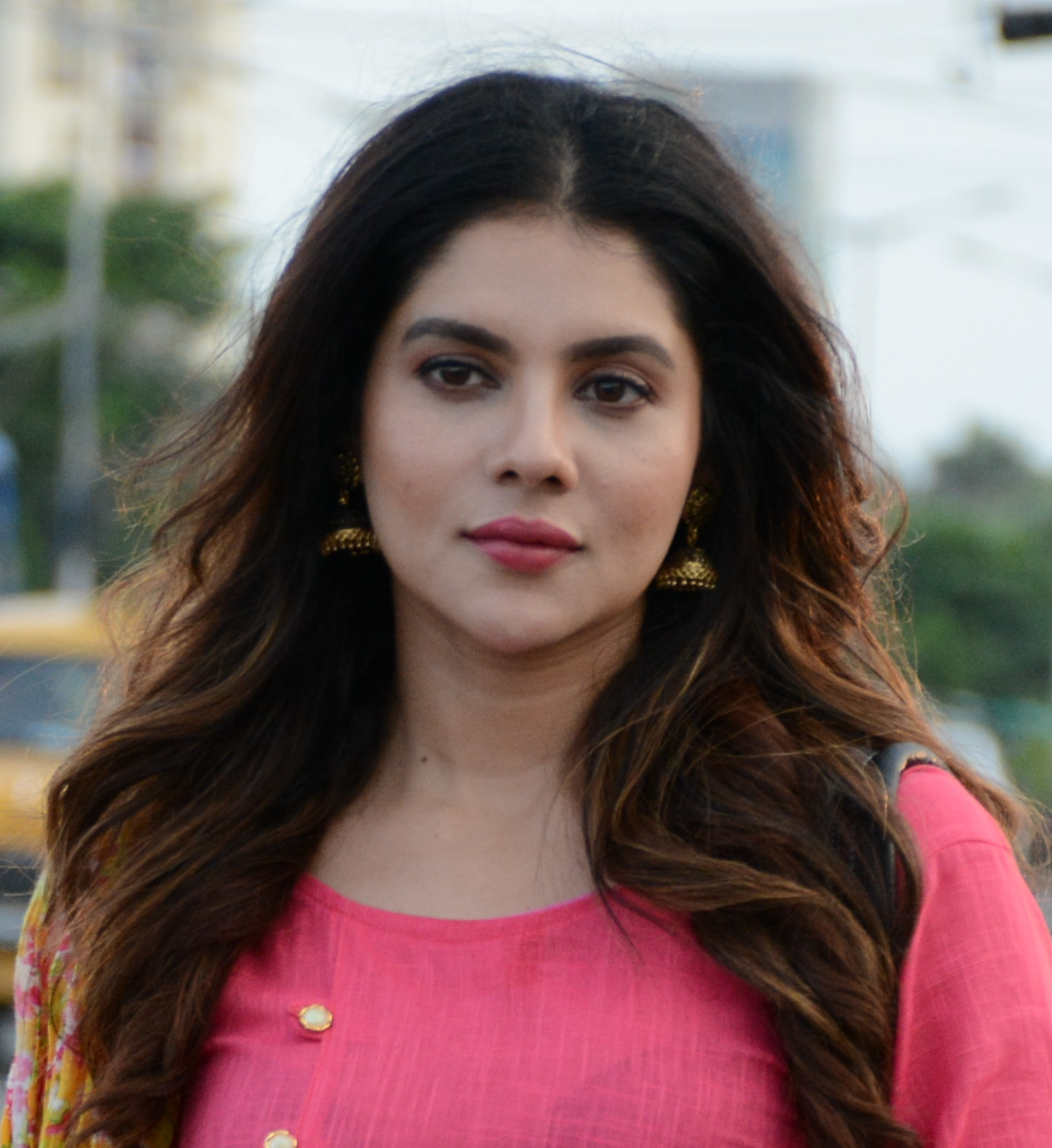
- Sarkar in 2019
- Born: 10 February 1984 (age 42); Calcutta, West Bengal, India
- Education: Jadavpur University
- Occupations: Actress; Politician
- Years active: 2004–present
- Political party: Bharatiya Janata Party (2021–present)

Payel Sarkar (or Paayel Sarkar) is an Indian actress and politician who has appeared in Bengali films and Hindi television.

== Career ==
Sarkar made her Bollywood Hindi debut in the 2015 movie Guddu Ki Gun.

== Political career ==
Sarkar joined Bharatiya Janata Party on 25 February 2021. She contested in 2021 West Bengal Legislative Assembly election from Behala Purba constituency but lost.

== Filmography ==
Key
†	Denotes films that have not yet been released

List of Payel Sarkar film credits
Year	Title	Role	Notes
2004	Sudhu Tumi	Anjana	
2006	Bibar	Iti	
2007	I Love You	Pooja	
2007	FM Fun Aur Masti	Rosy	
2009	Cross Connection	Piya	
2009	Prem Aamar	Riya	
2010	Le Chakka	Rani Mitra	Anandalok Puraskar for Best Actress
2011	Jaani Dekha Hobe	Hiya	
2012	Le Halua Le	Sonali	
2012	Bojhena Shey Bojhena	Joyeeta	
2012	Bawali Unlimited	Munmun	
2013	Golemale Pirit Koro Na	Banya	
2013	Asharay Goppo		
2014	Bangali Babu English Mem	Air hostage Liza	Cameo
2014	Bachchan	Trisha	
2014	Chotushkone	Nilanjana/Young Trina	
2015	Ebar Shabor	Joyeeta Ghosh	
2015	Lorai: Play to Live	Anuradha S. Ryan	
2015	Amanush 2	Ria	
2015	Jamai 420	Julie	
2015	Jomer Raja Dilo Bor	Rea Banerjee	Kalakar Award for Best Actress
2015	Guddu Ki Gun	Kaali	Debut Hindi film
2016	Agantuker Pore		
2016	Eagoler Chokh		
2016	Hemanta		
2016	Chocolate		
2017	Jio Pagla		
2018	Bhaijaan Elo Re		
2019	Mukhomukhi		
2019	Jamai Badal		
2019	Bhalobashar Shohor		
2020	Korapaak		
2020	Mukhosh		
2020	Ekti Tara		
2020	Harano Prapti		ZEE5 release
2020	Biye.com		ZEE5 release
2021	Magic	Kriti's sister	
2021	Shimanto		
2021	Anusandhan		
2022	The Eken		
2022	Avijatrik	Tanuja	
2022	Jaalbandi		
2022	Kulpi		
2022	Jotugriho		
2022	Har Mana Har		
2023	Chayamoyee	Damini	
2023	Ektu Sore Bosun	Urmi	
2024	Abar Arownne Din Ratri	Nandini	
2024	Dard	Agni	Multilingual film; India Bangladesh joint venture
2025	Babu Shona	Titas	
2025	Alakshye Ritwick	Surama Ghatak	
2025	Prasna	Titli	
2025	The Academy of Fine Arts	Richa	
2027	Borobabu		

== Television ==
- Ekdin Pratidin as Diya [2005–2007]
- Love Story as Shruti opposite to Mishal Raheja [30 April 2007 – 17 January 2008]
- Waqt Batayega Kaun Apna Kaun Paraya as Rudra (Protagonist; also Shamli in her previous birth who was killed by her husband Jayant) [14 April 2008 – 30 October 2008]
- Shakuntala as Rajkumari Gauri [2 February 2009 – 15 May 2009]
- Ladies Special as Pooja Singh [25 May 2009 – 9 December 2009]

== Web series ==
List of Payel Sarkar web series credits
Year	Series	OTT	Character	Notes
2017	Cartoon	Hoichoi	Jinia	
2019	Sharate Aaj	ZEE5	Sahana	
2020	Shobdo Jobdo	Hoichoi	Aditi	
2020	Mismatch Season 3	Hoichoi	Nibedita	
2022	Encrypted	Klikk		
2022	Murder by the Sea	Hoichoi		
2022	Hello! Remember me?	Hoichoi		
2024	Kaantaye Kaantaye	Zee5	Kaveri Dutta Gupta	
2026	Choddobeshi	Hoichoi	Martha Savio	

== Awards ==
- Anandalok Award, 2010 Best Actress for Le Chakka
- Kalakar Awards, 2016 Best Actress for Jomer Raja Dilo Bor
