= Monchora =

- Theatrical release poster
- Bengali: মনচোরা
- Directed by: Sandip Ray
- Screenplay by: Sandip Ray
- Based on: Monchora by Sharadindu Bandyopadhyay
- Produced by: Kamal Mukut
- Starring: Abir Chatterjee; Saswata Chatterjee; Raima Sen; Paran Bandopadhyay; June Malia; Rana Mitra
- Cinematography: Sirsha Ray
- Edited by: Subroto Roy
- Music by: Sandip Ray
- Production company: MM Movies
- Distributed by: Eros International
- Release date: 1 January 2016
- Running time: 96 minutes
- Country: India
- Language: Bengali

Monchora (Bengali: মনচোরা, English: The Heart Stealer) is a 2016 Bengali thriller film directed by Sandip Ray, based on the story of same name by Sharadindu Bandyopadhyay starring Abir Chatterjee, Saswata Chatterjee, Raima Sen, Paran Bandopadhyay. The film released on 1 January 2016.

== Plot ==
Based on a story by the famous author Sharadindu Bandyopadhyay, Monchora brings Abir Chatterjee and Raima Sen together. The film revolves around the story of a thief played by Abir Chatterjee. The story revolves around a family heirloom. A precious red ruby which is worshipped by the family as their god the 'Surjo moni'. The family comprises an elderly man, Mr. Choudhury, who has an interest in astrology, his grandson Manmatha, a bachelor with a reckless life, who has an alleged affair with a con woman, Lily. He comes late at night though his grandfather resents it. However, the servant Shebak and Manmatha's sister Nanda save him every time. One night while waiting for Manmatha Shebak sees a thief in black clothes who flees the very moment. Soon there is a chaos as to where the thief went but after assuring that nothing has gone missing they go back to their rooms. However Nanda is shocked to see the thief in her room. He calms he and says that he is hungry and that no one gave him a job as a result he has to make a living through this. Nanda convinces him to change his path and come back and meet him the next day and plans for him to get the job of her grandfather's secretary. He comes the next morning and somehow manages to get the job. Slowly impressing Mr. Choudhury and engaging romantically with Nanda he learns about the Surjo moni. However Nanda keeps warning him to keep his hands off that thing. In the meanwhile Mr. Choudhury gifts Nanda a golden necklace and in a fit of impressing Lily Manmatha steals it and gives it to her. When Nanda can't find it she unintentionally accuses Dibakar of the theft. Dibakar assures her that he will bring it back and keeps his word. After bringing back the necklace he warns Manmatha of Lily's image but he despises him but Nanda hears everything and apologises to Dibakar.Mr. Choudhury slowly becomes secured about Dibakar's presence and wants Nanda to continue her feelings for Dibakar. Mr Chowdhury predicts that Nanda has no chance of getting married for the next three years. One day, coming back from shopping, Nanda overhears a police saying to her grandfather that the thief who entered their house was a clever one and has been in this track for a long time and that he works solo. Again the needle of questions pointed towards Dibakar and Nanda confronts him to which he says that he was addicted to stealing and started it at a very young age and that night he came for the sunstone but then he got attached to the family and specially to Nanda. After that we see that Lily persuades Manmatha to bring the sunstone to her and that they would run away. Somehow learns of Lily's intentions and follows Manmatha to her place. When Manmatha reaches Lily's place he sees that they are there are two people already there they knock him down and take the sunstone. Just in time Dibakar enters the house and seize Lily and her group. He calls Nanda and asks him to come there with her grandfather . In the meanwhile he asks Manmatha to play the hero and pretends to be in Lily's group when police comes there sees him and arrests him also however Mr. Choudury is not ready to believe that he is a thief. The next morning its shown that Manmatha and Nanda rekindle there relation. They go out to meet the B Dibakar and it is shown that Mr Chowdhury is reading the newspaper out loud he reads that Dibakar who was arrested last night will be in jail for three years ask where they are going and they say that they are going to meet a special friend to which the grandfather response that they should tell that special friend that Nanda will get married after three years implying that Nanda will marry him.

== Cast ==
- Abir Chatterjee as Dibakar Roy
- Saswata Chatterjee as Manmatha
- Raima Sen as Nanda
- Paran Bandopadhyay as Mr. Chowdhury
- June Malia as Lily
- Rana Mitra

== Production ==
=== Casting ===
Abir Chatterjee, Saswata Chatterjee, Raima Sen, Paran Bandopadhyay, June Malia

=== Filming ===
Shooting begun from early 2015. After success of Bela Seshe, M.M Movies led by Kamal Mukut teamed up with Sandip Ray to produce the movie.

== Release ==
Monchora released on 1 January 2016 in West Bengal and nationally.
