= Bornoporichoy =

2019 Bengali film

- Theatrical release poster
- Directed by: Mainak Bhaumik
- Written by: Mainak Bhaumik
- Story by: Mainak Bhaumik
- Starring: Jisshu Sengupta; Abir Chatterjee; Priyanka Sarkar
- Cinematography: Ramyadip Saha
- Edited by: Sanglap Bhowmik
- Music by: Indraadip Dasgupta
- Production company: Shree Venkatesh Films
- Release date: 26 July 2019
- Running time: 101 minutes
- Country: India
- Language: Bengali

Bornoporichoy (Learning alphabets) is a 2019 Indian Bengali-language neo-noir action crime thriller film written and directed by Mainak Bhowmick. The film starring Jisshu Sengupta, Abir Chatterjee and Priyanka Sarkar was released under the banner of Shree Venkatesh Films on 26 July 2019. The action stunts of this film are directed by Sunil Rodrigues. Anupam Roy is the music director of the film.

== Plot ==
Dhananjoy Chatterjee is a burnt-out but bright police detective, who has been in hot pursuit of Arko Bhattacharya, a serial killer. Arko has been on a vicious killing spree, with his victims seemingly being random people. There does not seem to be any connection or common factor between any two murders. The case takes a toll on Dhananjoy, and his wife, Malini leaves him, along with their son, Gogol. The murders stop and the killer suddenly disappears. With the trail turning cold and with his personal life in shambles, Dhananjoy takes to drinking. After an inexplicable and mysterious hiatus, the murders resume, forcing Dhananjoy to kick the bottle, pick up the pieces, and join the pursuit of the dangerous killer once again.

== Cast ==
- Jisshu Sengupta as Dhananjoy Chatterjee, a police detective
- Abir Chatterjee as Arko Bhattacharya
- Priyanka Sarkar as Malini Chatterjee, wife of Dhananjoy
- Dipro Sen as Gogol, son of Dhananjoy and Malini
- Mithu Chakraborty as Malini's mother
- Sudip Mukherjee as Senior Inspector Karmakar
- Prantik Banerjee as Inspector Indra
- Kaushik Bhattacharya as Inspector Proshun

== Release ==
The film was released theatrically on 26 July 2019.

== Soundtrack ==
Bornoporichoy

Soundtrack album by Anupam Roy
- Released: 14 July 2019
- Recorded: 2019
- Studio: Sonic Solutions
- Genre: Feature film soundtrack
- Length: 13:11
- Label: SVF

Anupam Roy chronology
Bhootchakra Pvt. Ltd. (2019)	Bornoporichoy (2019)	Dhumketu (2019)

The soundtrack is composed by Anupam Roy on his own lyrics.

All lyrics are written by Anupam Roy; all music is composed by Anupam Roy.

Track list
No.	Title	Singer	Length
1.	"Bishonno Chimney"	Arijit Singh	4:33
2.	"Bornoporichoy"	Dibyendu Mukherjee	4:16
3.	"Protibeshi"	Anupam Roy	4:22
Total length:			13:11
