= Alaap (2024 film) =

2024 Indian Bengali-language romantic comedy film

- Theatrical Release Poster
- Directed by: Premendu Bikash Chaki
- Written by: Premendu Bikash Chaki; Padmanabha Dasgupta
- Screenplay by: Padmanabha Dasgupta; Premendu Bikash Chaki
- Produced by: Nispal Singh; Surinder Singh
- Starring: Abir Chatterjee; Mimi Chakraborty; Swastika Dutta; Anusua Das
- Cinematography: Anirban Chatterjee
- Edited by: Md. Kalam
- Music by: Anupam Roy
- Production company: Surinder Films
- Distributed by: Surinder Films
- Release date: 26 April 2024
- Running time: 145 minutes
- Country: India
- Language: Bengali

Alaap is a 2024 Indian Bengali-language romantic drama film written and directed by Premendu Bikash Chaki. Produced by Nispal Singh and Surinder Singh under the banner of Surinder Films, it stars Abir Chatterjee, Mimi Chakraborty and Swastika Dutta in the lead roles.

The music and the lyrics is composed and written by Anupam Roy. Anirban Chatterjee handled the cinematography while M.D Kalam did the editing. The film was released in the cinemas on 26 April 2024. The film became a surprise hit at the box-office.

== Plot ==
The story revolves around the love life in the professional field of the three protagonists: Pablo Majumdar, Aditi Mitra and Swatilekha Sen, who work in different IT companies at Sector V. Anusua Das is a co-worker at Pablo's workplace. Pablo and Aditi cross paths in their professional sphere regarding sharing a flat.

Aditi had to travel 20km daily to her office, thus often reporting late for work. With her job being important, she was desperately looking for a place to stay that’s closer to her office. On the other side, Pablo was searching for another shared accommodation since his flatmate was getting married. In the meantime, he found a shared accommodation but, unknown to him, his flatmate was a woman (Aditi). So, to avoid any conflicts, the building’s caretaker made an arrangement where both Pablo and Aditi could live in the flat without ever knowing each other, owing to their different work schedules.

Thus, while Pablo stayed in the flat during the daytime due to his night office, Aditi stayed in the nights as her office time was in the day. In this way, they lived in the same flat, but without crossing each other's paths. They shared food, newspapers, cacti and yet remained unknown to each other. Short sticky notes pasted on the common refrigerator became their mode of conversation.

But one day, Pablo came to know that his flatmate is not a guy, but a girl. Coincidentally, his parents also arrived at that time to meet him but misunderstood him to be staying in a live-in relationship with a girl (Aditi). In a hurry they wanted to forcefully fix his marriage with Swatilekha, his childhood friend and teacher's daughter. On the other hand, Aditi had also shifted to another city with a new job. But by that time, Pablo and Aditi realised that they have fallen in love. This leads to series of events carved around the comedy of errors trope, that unfolds the complicacies of relationships, subtle emotions and commitment issues.

== Cast ==
- Abir Chatterjee as Pablo Majumdar
- Mimi Chakraborty as Aditi Mitra
- Swastika Dutta as Swatilekha Sen
- Anusua Das as Anusua, Pablo's colleague at office
- RJ Rohit Gupta as Sukhlal, a broker
- Kinjal Nanda as Suman
- Tonni Laha Roy as Aditi's friend
- Debopriyo Mukherjee as Pablo's friend Manon
- Bhadra Basu as a neighbour

== Production ==
=== Announcement and development ===
The film was announced with a poster on 14 February 2024 on the event of Valentine's Day and Saraswati Puja. The poster announced the name of the director along with the star cast. This film marked the reunion of Abir and Mimi after their last film Raktabeej, which became a box office success.

=== Filming ===
The film was shot mostly in Kolkata, New Town, Howrah and New Delhi. The shooting was completed and wrapped up on 24 February 2024.

=== Marketing ===
A motion poster of the film was released on 2nd April 2024. The trailer of the film was released directly on 11 April 2024, without any teaser released prior to it. The lead duo gave interviews to various Bengali news portals like Anandabazar Patrika and others.

== Music ==
Alaap

Soundtrack album by Anupam Roy
- Released: 2024
- Recorded: 2023
- Studios: Ananjan’s Studio; Raja’s Cue Studio; Boing Studio
- Genre: Feature film soundtrack
- Length: 12:25
- Language: Bengali
- Label: Surinder Films
- Producers: Nispal Singh; Surinder Singh

Anupam Roy chronology
Dhai Aakhar (2023)	Alaap (2024)	Ajogyo (2024)

The music of the film and the lyrics are composed and written by Anupam Roy.

The first single "Abohawa Bole Dey" was released on 5th April 2024. The second single "Dibaratrir Kabyo" was released on 14 April 2024. The third single "Sokhi Go" was released on 23 April 2024.

Track list
No.	Title	Singer(s)	Length
1.	"Abohawa Bole Dey"	Rohan Basu, Somlata Acharyya Chowdhury	3:28
2.	"Dibaratrir Kabyo"	Anupam Roy, Lagnajita Chakraborty	5:00
3.	"Sokhi Go"	Shreya Ghoshal	3:57
Total length:			12:25

== Release ==
The film was released in the theatres on 26 April 2024, with approximately 94 shows.

== Reception ==
=== Critical reception ===
Agnivo Nyogi of The Telegraph reviewed the film on a positive note, praising Abir and Mimi's performance, their chemistry the simple yet engaging screenplay, the real life characters, the music and background score. He complimented Abir in this role, which he pulled off with ease. Suparna Majumder of Sangbad Pratidin reviewed the film on a positive note and wrote "The film presents a unique love story which revolves around the life of two corporate employees. Abir and Mimi are perfect in their roles." She also praised the music of the film and acting of all the other cast but criticised the length and stretched ending.

Shamayita Chakraborty of OTTplay rated the film 3.5 stars and mentioned it as "A modern love in new-age Kolkata. It is a contemporary love story handled maturely and presented on a platter full of care." She praised the writing of Chaki and Dasgupta, the chemistry between the lead pair, the delightful music and perfect BGM. Subhasmita Kanji of Hindustan Times rated the film 4.4 out of 5 stars and wrote "The film is an example of a simple love story which is like a blow of fresh air in the hot summer. The chemistry between Abir and Mimi was breathtaking. The short yet apt role of Swastika, the writing, the idea and the music, everything was refreshing."

Debarshi Bandyopadhyay of Anandabazar Patrika rated the film 7 out of 10 stars and wrote "This movie is a simple love story in this generation of situationships, ghosting, bombing and benching. The film depicts the struggles in a modern city life, the loneliness of the people and the rare existence of true selfless love." He praised the acting of Abir, Mimi and Bhadra Basu, the background score, the songs as well as the screenplay.

Chaand from Calcutta Critique rated the film as 4 out of 5 stars on his YouTube channel and mentioned that "The simplicity of the movie is a breath of fresh air in this world of fast paced masala movie generation. Both Abir and Mimi are wonderful and looked so natural. Swastika has done justice to her role even though it's short. However for me, Anusua Das, although debutante with just few minutes of role, is a seasoned model well known in this line of work. She showed great potential, is a fresh face and has a lot of work lined up. Anusua Das is certainly someone to look out for"

== Awards ==
- Best Romantic Hero of the Year for Abir Chatterjee for Alaap at Tele Cine Awards 2024 .
