= Ebela =

Indian newspaper

- Ami amar moto
- Type: Daily newspaper
- Format: Tabloid
- Owner: ABP Group
- Editor-in-chief: Arup Sarkar
- Editor: Anirban Chattopadhyay
- Language: Bengali
- Headquarters: 6, Prafulla Sarkar Street, Kolkata 700001
- Sister newspapers: Anandabazar Patrika, The Telegraph
- Website: www.ebela.in

Ebela (Bengali: এবেলা) was a Bengali tabloid targeted primarily at young Bengali readers of West Bengal. It is the second Bengali daily published by ABP Group after Anandabazar Patrika. The 24-page tabloid was being circulated in Kolkata and Howrah only. The newspaper was discontinued on 17 December 2018.

== Sections ==
- Ebela, the main section of the newspaper, covering the latest news of West Bengal, India and the world
- Obela covers topics related to entertainment, film, music, city festivals, and television schedules
- Rabibela, a special section of Sunday editions (discontinued)

== See also ==
- Ei Samay
