= Laban Hrad Vidyapith =

Govt. school in Kolkata, West Bengal, India

Laban Hrad Vidyapith is a higher secondary school, situated in Salt Lake City, Bidhannagar, Kolkata, India. Founded on 21 January 1980, the school is affiliated to the West Bengal Board of Secondary Education. In 1986, the school added a new building and extended to Higher Secondary (class XI and XII) in Science and Arts streams.

== History ==
The school was inaugurated by Prasanta Sur, the minister-in-charge for Salt Lake Plan. The first secretary of the advisory board of the school was Mr. Subhas Chakraborty, the Honorable Minister of Youth Welfare and Sport Ministry of West Bengal government.

The school first opened as a co-educational school. In 1981, the school was split up, and the campus at Block AD was converted into boys' only, and a new campus was opened at Block EC, also in Sector I, Saltlake City, as Laban Hrad Vidyapith for Girls.

== See also ==
- List of schools in Kolkata
- List of schools in West Bengal
