= Jomer Raja Dilo Bor =

2015 Indian Bengali film

Jomer Raja Dilo Bor Bengali Movie
- Jomer Raja Dilo Bor Bengali Film Poster
- Directed by: Abir Sengupta
- Written by: Abir Sengupta
- Screenplay by: Abir Sengupta
- Story by: Abir Sengupta
- Produced by: Prateek Chakravorty; Anushree Mehta
- Starring: Payel Sarkar; Abir Chatterjee; Rajatava Dutta; Kharaj Mukherjee; Laboni Sarkar
- Cinematography: Pratik Deora
- Edited by: Sanjib Kumar Dutta
- Music by: Anupam Roy
- Production companies: Pramod Films; Anushree Abir Entertainment
- Distributed by: Reliance Entertainment
- Release date: 4 September 2015
- Running time: 145 minutes
- Country: India
- Language: Bengali

Jomer Raja Dilo Bor (Bengali: যমের রাজা দিল বর; transl: Lord Yama gives a boon) is a Bengali-language romantic fantasy comedy film starring Abir Chatterjee & Payel Sarkar in lead roles. The film is a surreal romantic comedy directed by Abir Sengupta. Previously Raima Sen was roped in for the project but later Payel Sarkar replaced her. Anupam Roy did the music for this film.

== Synopsis ==
Ria Bannerjee Payel Sarkar is an author who hates men from the core of her heart. She thinks that men only have a body, they don’t have a soul. For obvious reasons she doesn’t want to get married, but destiny makes her meet the ultimate Mr. Right called Deb Das which is played by Abir Chatterjee.

They have a perfect marriage. But, fate has other plans for her. On the very first morning after her marriage, Ria finds her husband Deb dead. Destiny’s plans do not end here. She soon finds her way to Yamlok and is now face to face with Yamraj to get her husband back from the God of death Himself. But the bor or boon that the Yamraj gives to Ria changes her and Deb’s life forever. In the end they get together after all. Some new artists like Ujjal Mohanta ( Martial Arts & Fitness Expert ) are also found in the movie.

== Cast ==
- Payel Sarkar as Ria Banerjee
- Abir Chatterjee as Deb Das
- Rajatava Dutta as Yamraj 1
- Kharaj Mukherjee as Yamraj 2
- Laboni Sarkar as Indrani Banerjee
- Arindam Sil as Manohar Gyandas Pandey aka M.G Pandey
- Debleena Dutta as Jhumpa
- Sanjay Biswas
- Sumit Sammadar
- Subhasish Banerjee
- Arunava Dutta as Chitragupta
- Anisha Mandal
- Ujjal Mohanta

== Soundtrack ==
No.	Title	Singer(s)	Length
1.	"Ei Shono"	Anupam Roy
2.	"Jomer Raja Dilo Bor"	Nabarun Bose, Silajit Majumder
3.	"Kichhuta Rohossyo"	Anupam Roy, Somlata Acharrya
4.	"Kemon Borje Chaicho"	Anindya Chatterjee, Upal Sengupta
