= Kaurab =

Bengali-language literary magazine

Kaurab is a Bengali language literary magazine. & others.

The Kaurab Magazine (Kaurab Patrikaa) has been in print since 1970. In 1982 it won the D. K. Gupta award as the most distinguished Bengali literary magazine. Kaurab's online version, Kaurab Online, is an electronic webzine of poetry and poetics, and houses an international translation and poetry book review archive. The webzine began in 1998, initially as a member site, moving on to becoming an independent dot com site in 2003. The publication of Kaurab's 100th print issue was celebrated in the Indian Museum on 5 December 2004 with a poetry festival. Since then the magazine has been edited by its online editor Aryanil Mukhopadhyay (Mukherjee) supported by Kaurab's second generation writers Sabyasachi Sanyal, Sudeshna Majumdar and Subhro Bandopadhyay.

In 2007, the new editorial team and its group of poets/writers around the world took the magazine to an unprecedented height by launching an International Poetry Reading/Discussion Series conducted over three continents in three languages - Bengali, English and Spanish. Poets from India, England, Spain, Chile and the US have participated in these events.

The print magazine is presently irregular, while the webzine version is bii-annual.
