= List of Indian Bengali films of 2023 =

This is a list of Bengali cinema films released in 2023.

== January – March ==
Opening		Title	Director	Cast	Production company	Ref.
J A N U A R Y	6	Manobjomin	Srijato	Parambrata Chatterjee, Priyanka Sarkar, Paran Bandopadhyay	Dag Creative Media	
J A N U A R Y	6	Rahasyamoy	Soumyaa Ghosh, Supria Bhattacharjee	Saswata Chatterjee, Anindya Chatterjee, Saayoni Ghosh	Amar Cinevision Pvt Ltd	
J A N U A R Y	13	Maayakumari	Arindam Sil	Abir Chatterjee, Rituparna Sengupta, Rajatava Dutta, Arunima Ghosh, Indrasish Roy, Ambarish Bhattacharya, Sauraseni Maitra	Camellia Productions	
J A N U A R Y	20	Doctor Bakshi	Saptaswa Basu	Parambrata Chatterjee, Subhashree Ganguly, Bonny Sengupta	SMV Studios	
J A N U A R Y	20	Kaberi Antardhan	Kaushik Ganguly	Prosenjit Chatterjee, Srabanti Chatterjee	Surinder Films	
J A N U A R Y	20	Dilkhush	Rahool Mukherjee	Paran Bandopadhyay, Anashua Majumdar, Madhumita Sarcar, Soham Majumdar, Kharaj Mukherjee, Aparajita Auddy	SVF	
J A N U A R Y	20	Jai Kali Kalkattawali	Abhijit Guha, Sudeshna Roy	Soham Chakraborty, Somraj Maity, Susmita Chatterjee, Nusrat Jahan	ZEE5	
J A N U A R Y	27	Bhoy	Raja Chanda	Ankush Hazra, Nusraat Faria	ZEE5	
F E B R U A R Y	3	Aaro Ek Prithibi	Atanu Ghosh	Tasnia Farin, Kaushik Ganguly, Anindita Bose, Saheb Bhattacharya	Eskay Movies	
F E B R U A R Y	3	Revolver Rohoshyo	Anjan Dutta	Suprabhat Banerjee, Tanusree Chakraborty, Anjan Dutta	Color of Dreams Entertainment	
F E B R U A R Y	10	LSD: Laal Suitcase Ta Dekhechen?	Sayantan Ghosal	Soham Chakraborty, Saayoni Ghosh	Soham's Entertainment	
F E B R U A R Y	10	Mitthye Premer Gaan	Paroma Neotia	Anirban Bhattacharya, Ishaa Saha, Arjun Chakrabarty	Neostories Productions	
F E B R U A R Y	17	Daal Baati Churma Chochhori	Haranath Chakraborty	Bonny Sengupta, Koushani Mukherjee	BK Entertainment	
F E B R U A R Y	24	Mayar Jonjal	Indranil Roychowdhury	Ritwick Chakraborty, Chandrayee Ghosh, Shohel Mondal, Aupee Karim, Bratya Basu	Views and Visions, Indranil Roychowdhury Films	
M A R C H	10	Archier Gallery	Promita Bhattacharya	Bonny Sengupta, Ayoshi Talukdar, Rajatava Dutta	SC Entertainment	
M A R C H	17	Ghore Pherar Gaan	Aritra Sen	Ishaa Saha, Parambrata Chatterjee, Gourab Chatterjee	Eskay Movies	
M A R C H	24	Chirosakha Hey	Argha Deep Chatterjee	Tanusree Chakraborty, Ishan Mazumder	69 Creative Entertainment	

== April – June ==
Opening		Title	Director	Cast	Production company	Ref.
A P R I L	7	Borfi	Souvik Dey	Chandrayee Ghosh, Kaushik Sen, Amyth Sethi, Aritra Dutta Banik, Kamaleshwar Mukherjee, Abhijit Guha, Anamika Saha, Piyali Chakraborty, Srinjoy Mukherjee	MS Films & Production	
A P R I L	7	Akorik	Tathagata Bhattacherjee	Victor Banerjee, Rituparna Sengupta, Anuradha Roy	Iceberg Creations	
A P R I L	14	The Eken: Ruddhaswas Rajasthan	Joydip Mukherjee	Anirban Chakrabarti, Somak Ghosh, Suhatro Mukhopadhyay, Rajatava Dutta, Sandipta Sen	SVF	
A P R I L	14	Shesh Pata	Atanu Ghosh	Prosenjit Chatterjee, Gargi Roychowdhury, Vikram Chatterjee, Rayati Bhattacharya	Friends Communication	
A P R I L	14	Love Marriage	Premendu Bikash Chaki	Ankush Hazra, Oindrila Sen, Ranjit Mallick, Aparajita Auddy, Sohag Sen	Surinder Films	
A P R I L	21	Chengiz	Rajesh Ganguly	Jeet, Susmita Chatterjee, Shataf Figar, Rohit Roy	Jeetz Filmworks	
M A Y	5	Master Anshuman	Sagnik Chatterjee	Priyanka Upendra, Rajatava Dutta		
M A Y	12	Fatafati	Aritra Mukherjee	Ritabhari Chakraborty, Abir Chatterjee, Swastika Dutta, Ambarish Bhattacharya	Windows Production	
M A Y	19	Tenida and Co.	Sayantan Ghosal	Kanchan Mullick, Gaurav Chakrabarty, Sabyasachi Chakrabarty, Ridhima Ghosh	Surinder Films	
M A Y	19	Nonte Fonte	Anirban Chakraborty	Sohom Basu Roychowdhuri, Paran Bandopadhyay, Manojyoti Mukherjee, Subhasish Mukherjee		
M A Y	25	Abar Bibaho Obhijaan	Soumik Haldar	Ankush Hazra, Nusraat Faria, Rudranil Ghosh, Sohini Sarkar, Anirban Bhattacharya, Priyanka Sarkar	SVF	
J U N E	2	Ardhangini	Kaushik Ganguly	Churni Ganguly, Jaya Ahsan, Kaushik Sen	Surinder Films	
J U N E	2	Ghasjomi	Sumantra Roy	Sawon Chakraborty, Suvosmita Mukherjee, Aarshi Roy, Debashish Chatterjee, Sanjita Pother	Mosaic In Films	
J U N E	2	Aporajeyo	Nehal Dutta	Ranjit Mallick		
J U N E	16	Datta	Nirmal Chakraborty	Rituparna Sengupta		
J U N E	23	Aador	Debdut Ghosh	Rajatava Dutta		
J U N E	30	Shibpur	Arindam Bhattacharya	Parambrata Chatterjee, Swastika Mukherjee, Rajatava Dutta Kharaj Mukherjee, Mamata Shankar, Sujan Mukhopadhyay, Susmita Chatterjee	Indo Americana Production	
J U N E	30	Shohorer Ushnotomo Din E	Aritra Sen	Vikram Chatterjee, Solanki Roy	Shadow Films, Roadshow Films, RT Entertainment	

== July – September ==
Opening		Title	Director	Cast	Production company	Ref.
J U L Y	7	Mayaa	Raajhorshee De	Rafiath Rashid Mithila, Gaurav Chakrabarty, Tanusree Chakraborty, Gourab Chatterjee, Sudipta Chakraborty, Kamaleshwar Mukherjee, Koneenica Banerjee, Rahul Banerjee, Anindya Chatterjee, Devlina Kumar, Ranieeta Dash	SS3 Entertainment	
J U L Y	14	Biye Bibhrat	Raja Chanda	Lahoma Bhattacharya, Abir Chatterjee, Parambrata Chatterjee	Shadow Films, Roadshow Films	
J U L Y	21	Niharika	Indrasis Acharya	Anuradha Mukherjee, Silajit Majumder, Mallika Mazumder, Anindya Sengupta	Pastel Entertainment	
J U L Y	28	Fotema	Atiul islam	Rahul Banerjee, Moon Sarkar	PM Movies	
A U G U S T	11	Byomkesh O Durgo Rahasya	Birsa Dasgupta	Dev, Rukmini Maitra, Ambarish Bhattacharya	Shadow Films, Dev Entertainment Ventures	
A U G U S T	11	Cheeni 2	Mainak Bhaumik	Aparajita Auddy, Madhumita Sarcar, Anirban Chakrabarti, Lily Chakravarty, Soumyo Mukherjee	SVF	
A U G U S T	15	Eklavya	Aritra Banerjee	Devtanu, Annmary Tom, Jammy Banerjee, Mrituyunjoy Bhattacharya		
A U G U S T	25	Oh! Lovely	Haranath Chakraborty	Srish Chatterjee, Rajnandini Paul, Laboni Sarkar, Kharaj Mukherjee, Madan Mitra		
S E P T E M B E R	1	Kirtan	Abhimanyu Mukherjee	Arunima Ghosh, Paran Bandyopadhyay, Gourab Chatterjee, Aparajita Ghosh	Camellia Production	
S E P T E M B E R	22	Palan	Kaushik Ganguly	Anjan Dutta, Mamata Shankar, Jisshu Sengupta, Paoli Dam	Pramod Films, The Big Day	
S E P T E M B E R	22	Kothay Tumi	Anthony Jane	Taabbu, Rittika Sen, Rajatava Dutta, Kharaj Mukherjee, Shantilal Mukherjee, Soma Mukherjee, Arioshi Synthia	Clapboard Entertainment	
S E P T E M B E R	29	Tarokar Mrityu	Haranath Chakraborty	Ranjit Mallick, Ritwick Chakraborty, Parno Mittra	Surinder Films	
S E P T E M B E R	29	Angshuman MBA	Sudeshna Roy, Abhijit Guha	Soham Chakraborty, Koushani Mukherjee	ZEE5	

== October – December ==
Opening		Title	Director	Cast	Production company	Ref.
O C T O B E R	6	Pakdondi	Rohan Sen	Bonny Sengupta, Parno Mittra	Frame Per Second Entertainment	
O C T O B E R	19	Bagha Jatin	Arun Roy	Dev, Sreeja Dutta, Sudipta Chakraborty, Samiul Alam, Shoaib Kabeer, Rohaan Bhattacharjee, Alexandra Taylor	Dev Entertainment Ventures	
O C T O B E R	19	Raktabeej	Nandita Roy & Shiboprosad Mukherjee	Abir Chatterjee, Mimi Chakraborty, Victor Banerjee, Anashua Majumdar	Windows Production	
O C T O B E R	19	Jongole Mitin Mashi	Arindam Sil	Koel Mallick, Subhrajit Dutta, Samiul Alam, Riya Banik	Camellia Productions	
O C T O B E R	19	Dawshom Awbotaar	Srijit Mukherji	Prosenjit Chatterjee, Anirban Bhattacharya, Jisshu Sengupta, Jaya Ahsan	SVF	
O C T O B E R	19	Nikhoj	Indraadip Dasgupta	Soham Chakraborty	ZEE5	
N O V E M B E R	17	Nossir Kouto	Rajiv Ghosh	Abhishek Singh, Rupsha Mukhopadhyay, Laboni Sarkar, Biswanath Basu		
N O V E M B E R	24	Manush: Child of Destiny	Sanjoy Somadder	Jeet, Bidya Sinha Saha Mim, Susmita Chatterjee, Jeetu Kamal, Saurav Chakrabarti	Jeetz Filmworks	
N O V E M B E R	24	Ektu Sore Bosun	Kamaleshwar Mukherjee	Ritwick Chakraborty, Ishaa Saha, Kharaj Mukherjee, Paran Bandopadhyay, Rajatava Dutta, Paoli Dam, Payel Sarkar, Manasi Sinha.	Big Cat Films	
N O V E M B E R	24	Bogla Mama Jug Jug Jiyo	Dhrubo Banerjee	Kharaj Mukherjee, Riddhi Sen, Rajatava Dutta, Aparajita Adhya, Kaushik Sen, Ditipriya Roy	SVF	
N O V E M B E R	24	Kurban	Saibal Mukherjee	Ankush Hazra, Priyanka Sarkar	Albatross Productions	
N O V E M B E R	24	Sob Koro Prem Konona	Debraj Sinha	Bonny Sengupta	ZEE5	
D E C E M B E R	22	Pradhan	Avijit Sen	Dev, Paran Bandopadhyay, Soumitrisha Kundu	Dev Entertainment Ventures, Bengal Talkies	
D E C E M B E R	22	Kabuliwala	Suman Ghosh	Mithun Chakraborty, Abir Chatterjee, Anumegha Kahali, Sohini Sarkar	Shree Venkatesh Films, Jio Studios	
D E C E M B E R	29	Ghat Pratyaghat	Subir Pal Chowdhury	Manas Adhikari, Jyotsna Halder, Ramen Roy Chowdhury, Biswajit Chakraborty, Soma Chakraborty	Manas Adhikari Production, Mapmovies	

== See also ==
- List of Indian Bengali films of 2021
- List of Indian Bengali films of 2022
- Cinema of West Bengal
