= 7th WBFJA Award =

Indian film awards

2022-2023 WBFJA Awards
- Awarded for: Excellence in Indian Bengali cinema
- Announced on: Nominations: 4 January 2024
- Presented on: 14 January 2024
- Date: 14 January 2024
- Organised by: West Bengal Film Journalists’ Association (WBFJA)
- Official website: WBFJA

Highlights
- Best Film: Shesh Pata
- Best Direction: Atanu Ghosh
- Best Actor: Prosenjit Chatterjee
- Best Actress: Churni Ganguly; Swastika Mukherjee

The 7th Edition of the WBFJA Award, also known as Cinemar Samabartan (Convocation of Cinema or Carnival of Films), took place on 14 January 2024. It honored the best Indian Bengali films of 2023.

== Superlatives ==
Multiple wins
| Awards | Film |
|---|---|
| 7 | Shesh Pata |
| 3 | Dawshom Awbotaar |
| 2 | Aaro Ek Prithibi, Pradhan |

== Winners & Nominees ==
| Best Film | Best Director |
|---|---|
| Shesh Pata – Friends Communication; Ardhangini – Surinder Films; Maayakumari – Camellia Productions; Mayar Jonjal – Views and Visions and Indranil Roychowdhury Films | Atanu Ghosh – Shesh Pata; Arindam Sil – Maayakumari; Indranil Roychowdhury – Mayar Jonjal; Kaushik Ganguly – Palan |
| Best Actor | Best Actress |
| Prosenjit Chatterjee – Shesh Pata as Balmiki Sengupta; Abir Chatterjee – Maayakumari as Kanan Kumar; Anjan Dutt – Palan as Anjan Sen; Parambrata Chatterjee – Shibpur as Sultan Ahmed | Churni Ganguly – Ardhangini as Subhra Chatterjee; Swastika Mukherjee – Shibpur as Mandira Biswas; Arunima Ghosh – Maayakumari as Aruna / Rooni; Gargi Roychowdhury – Shesh Pata as Medha Roy; Rituparna Sengupta – Maayakumari as Maayakumari |
| Best Supporting Actor | Best Supporting Actress |
| Kaushik Ganguly – Aaro Ek Prithibi as Shrikanta Munshi; Ambarish Bhattacharya – Kaberi Antardhan as Amiyo Bhattacharya; Indrasish Roy – Maayakumari as Film Director; Kaushik Sen – Kaberi Antardhan as Mrinmoy Ghosh; Vikram Chatterjee – Shesh Pata as Saunak | Mamata Shankar – Palan as Mamata Sen; Ananya Sen – Dilkhush as Putul; Anindita Bose – Aaro Ek Prithibi as Ayesha; Jaya Ahsan – Ardhangini as Meghna Mustafi |
| Best Actor in a Negative Role | Best Actor in a Comic Role |
| Jisshu Sengupta – Dawshom Awbotaar as Biswarup Bardhan; Anirban Chakrabarti – Pradhan as Jatileshwar Mukherjee; Kharaj Mukherjee – Shibpur as Tapan Barik; Prosenjit Chatterjee – Kaberi Antardhan as Arghya Kamal Sen | Sohag Sen – Love Marriage; Ashim Roychowdhury – Daal Baati Churma Chacchori; Rajatava Dutta – Bogla Mama Jug Jug Jiyo; Ranjit Mullick – Love Marriage |
Debut Awards
| Most Promising Actor | Most Promising Actress |
| Biswajit Sarkar – Shibpur; Soumya Mukherjee – Mitthye Premer Gaan; Ujan Chatterjee – Bogla Mama Jug Jug Jiyo | Tasnia Farin – Aaro Ek Prithibi; Aishwarya Sen – Dilkhush |
Most Promising Director
Aritra Sen – Shohorer Ushnotomo Din E; Paroma Neotia – Mitthye Premer Gaan

=== Popular Choice Awards ===
| Most Popular Film | Most Popular Actor |
|---|---|
| Pradhan – Dev Entertainment Ventures; The Eken: Ruddhaswas Rajasthan – Shree Venkatesh Films; Bagha Jatin – Dev Entertainment Ventures; Dawshom Awbotaar – Shree Venkatesh Films; Raktabeej – Windows Production | Dev – Pradhan as Deepak Pradhan; Anirban Chakrabarti – The Eken: Ruddhaswas Rajasthan as Eken Babu; Mimi Chakraborty – Raktabeej as Sanjukta Mitra; Mithun Chakraborty – Kabuliwala as Rehmat Khan; Prosenjit Chatterjee – Dawshom Awbotaar as Prabir Roy Chaudhury |

=== Music Awards ===
| Best Music | Best Background Score |
|---|---|
| Bickram Ghosh – Maayakumari; Anupam Roy – Ardhangini; Anupam Roy –Dawshom Awbotaar; Kuntal De, Ranajoy Bhattacharjee and Soumya Rit – Mitthye Premer Gaan | Debojyoti Mishra – Shesh Pata; Amit Chatterjee – Shibpur; Joy Sarkar – Niharika; Neel Dutt – Palan; Prabuddha Banerjee – Kaberi Antardhan |
| Best Male Playback Singer | Best Female Playback Singer |
| Anupam Roy – "Ami Sei Manushta Aar Nei" – Dawshom Awbotaar; Anirban Bhattacharya – "Bibagi Phone" – Dilkhush; Arijit Singh – "Jiya Tui Chhara" – Biye Bibhrat; Manomoy Bhattacharya – "Chokher Jole" – Maayakumari | Iman Chakraborty – "Alada Alada" – Ardhangini; Antara Mitra – "Jani Okaron" – Fatafati; Madhubantii Bagchi – "Modhu Mashe" – Maayakumari; Shreya Ghoshal – "Toka Dile Bhenge Jabe" – Manobjomin |
