= 7th Filmfare Awards Bangla =

Indian film awards

- Presented on: 29 March 2024
- Site: ITC Royal Bengal, Kolkata
- Hosted by: Parambrata Chatterjee, Sauraseni Maitra; Sourav Das
- Organized by: The Times Group
- Official website: Filmfare Awards Bangla 2024

Highlights
- Best Film: Ardhangini
- Best Director: Atanu Ghosh for Shesh Pata
- Best Actor: Prosenjit Chatterjee for Shesh Pata
- Best Actress: Churni Ganguly for Ardhangini
- Best Critic: Mayar Jonjal; Niharika
- Most awards: Ardhangini (6)
- Most nominations: Shesh Pata (16)

Television coverage
- Network: Zee Bangla

The 7th Filmfare Awards Bangla is a ceremony, presented by The Times Group, which honored the best Indian Bengali-language films of 2023.

Shesh Pata led the ceremony with 16 nominations, and won 5 awards including Best Director (for Atanu Ghosh) and Best Actor (for Prosenjit Chatterjee). It was followed by Dawshom Awbotaar and Ardhangini, with 15 and 11 nominations respectively. While the former won only Best Music Director (for Anupam Roy), the latter went on to win a leading 6 awards, including Best Film, Best Actress (for Churni Ganguly), Best Supporting Actress (for Jaya Ahsan) and Best Supporting Actor (for Ambarish Bhattacharya).

Mayar Jonjal won 6 awards from 8 nominations, including Best Film Critics, also shared by Niharika which additionally received 6 nominations, subsequently winning Best Female Playback Singer (for Abarna Roy).

Jaya Ahsan received dual nominations for Best Actress and Best Supporting Actress, winning the latter.

== Ceremony ==
Held at ITC Royal Bengal, the 7th Filmfare Awards Bangla honoured the Bengali films released in 2023. At a press conference helmed by Jitesh Pillai, the editor of Filmfare magazine prior to the ceremony, Joy was revealed to be the title sponsor. Actors Parambrata Chatterjee, Sauraseni Maitra and Sourav Das were announced as the co-hosts, while actors Koel Mallick, Nusraat Faria, Srabanti Chatterjee, Bonny Sengupta, Koushani Mukherjee and Ankush Hazra were announced to be performing during the event. It took place on 29 March 2024, and was broadcast on 21 April 2024 on Zee Bangla.

== Winners and Nominees ==
The nominations were announced by Filmfare on 25 March 2024.

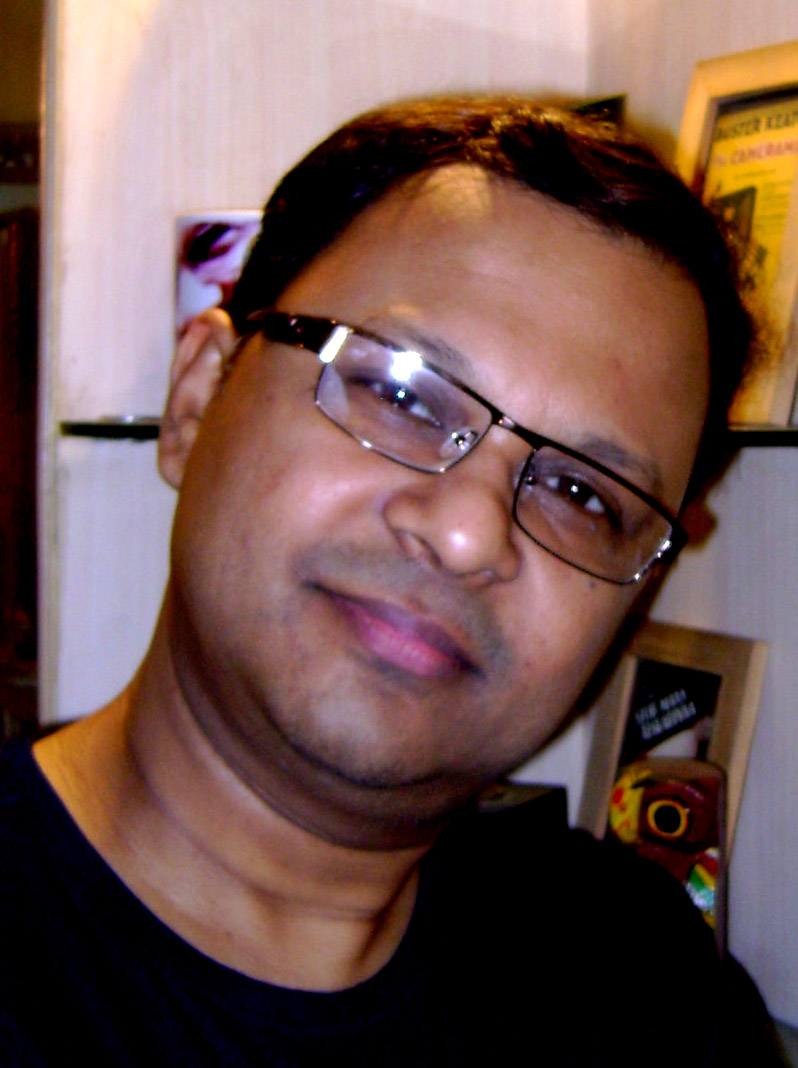
Atanu Ghosh, Best Director

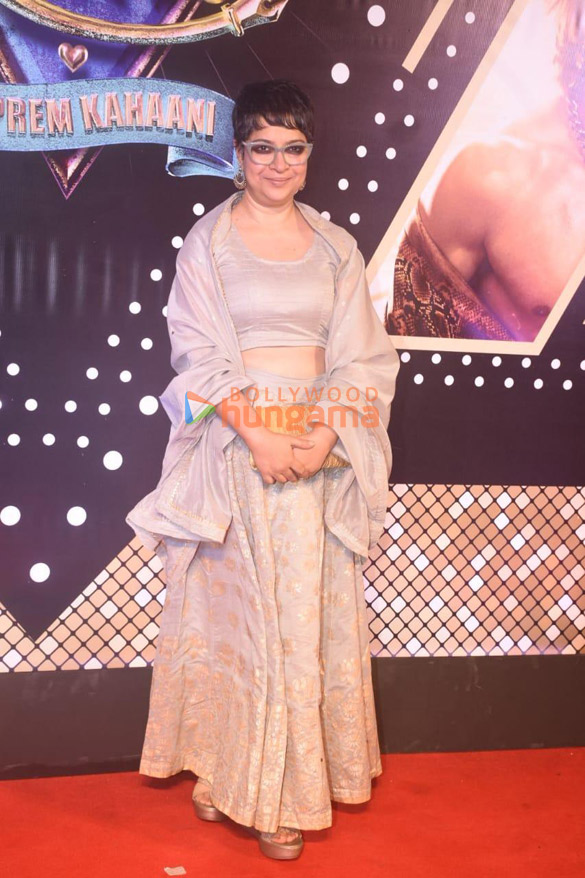
Churni Ganguly, Best Actress

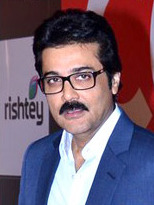
Prosenjit Chatterjee, Best Actor

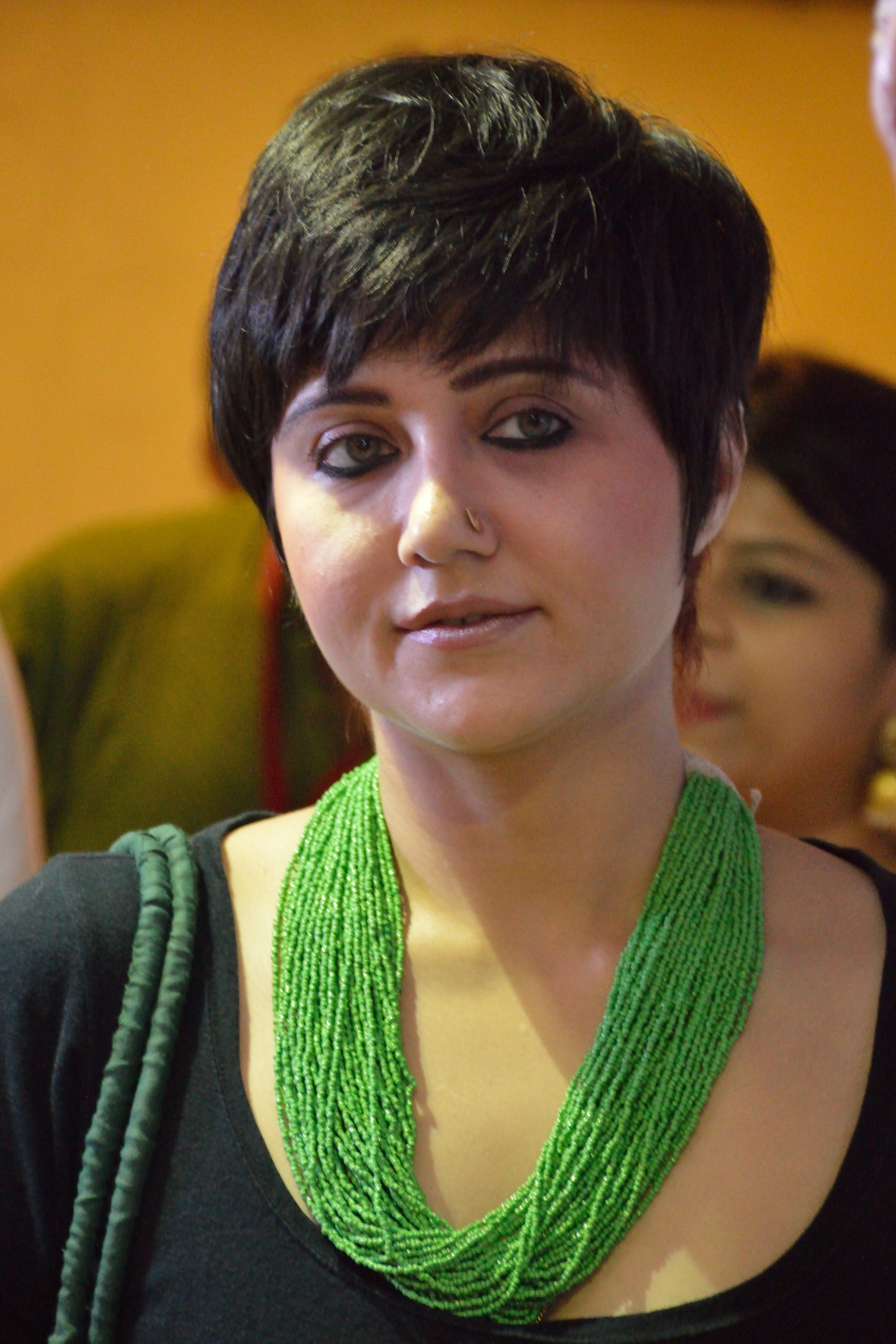
Swastika Mukherjee, Best Actress Critics

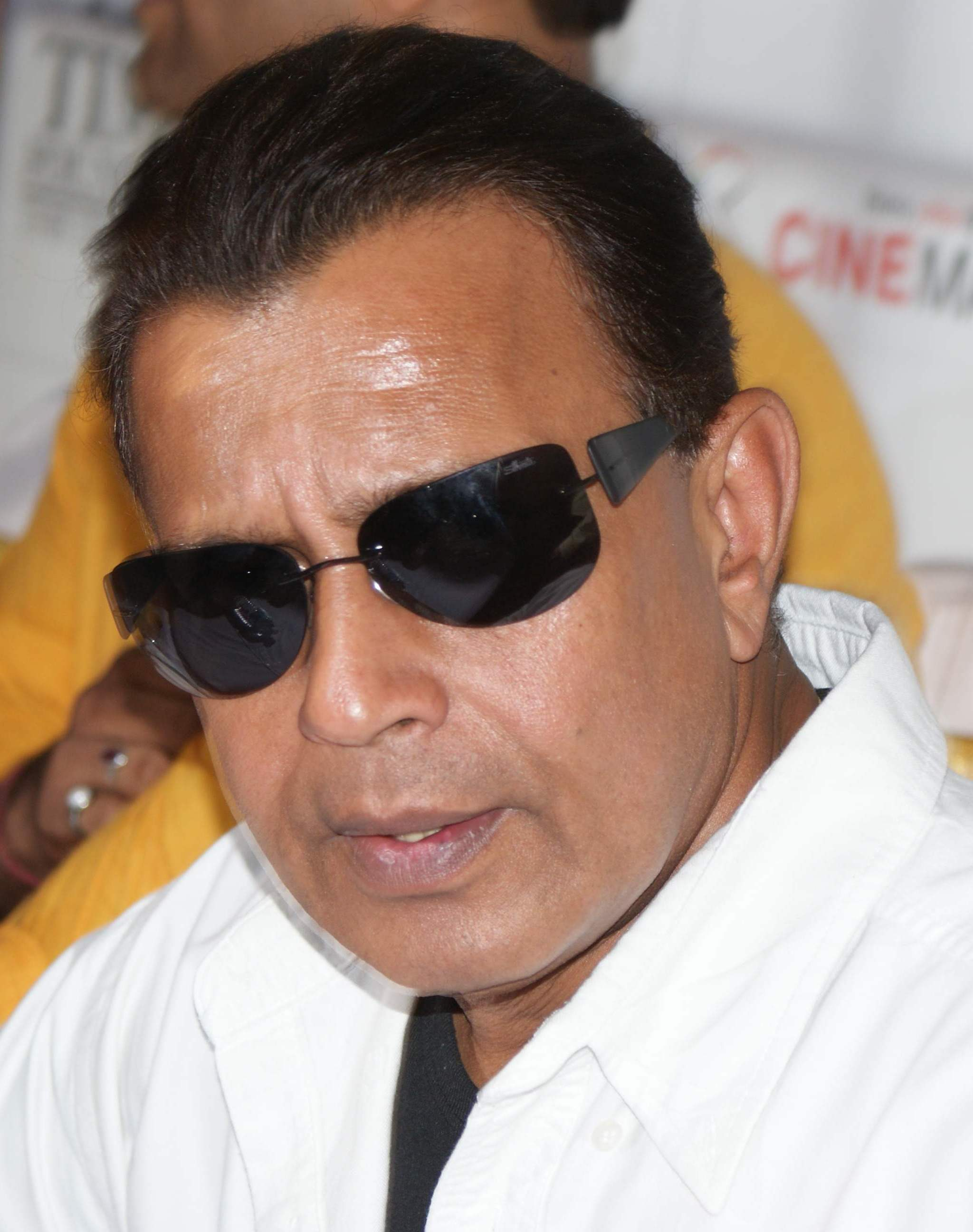
Mithun Chakraborty, Best Actor Critics

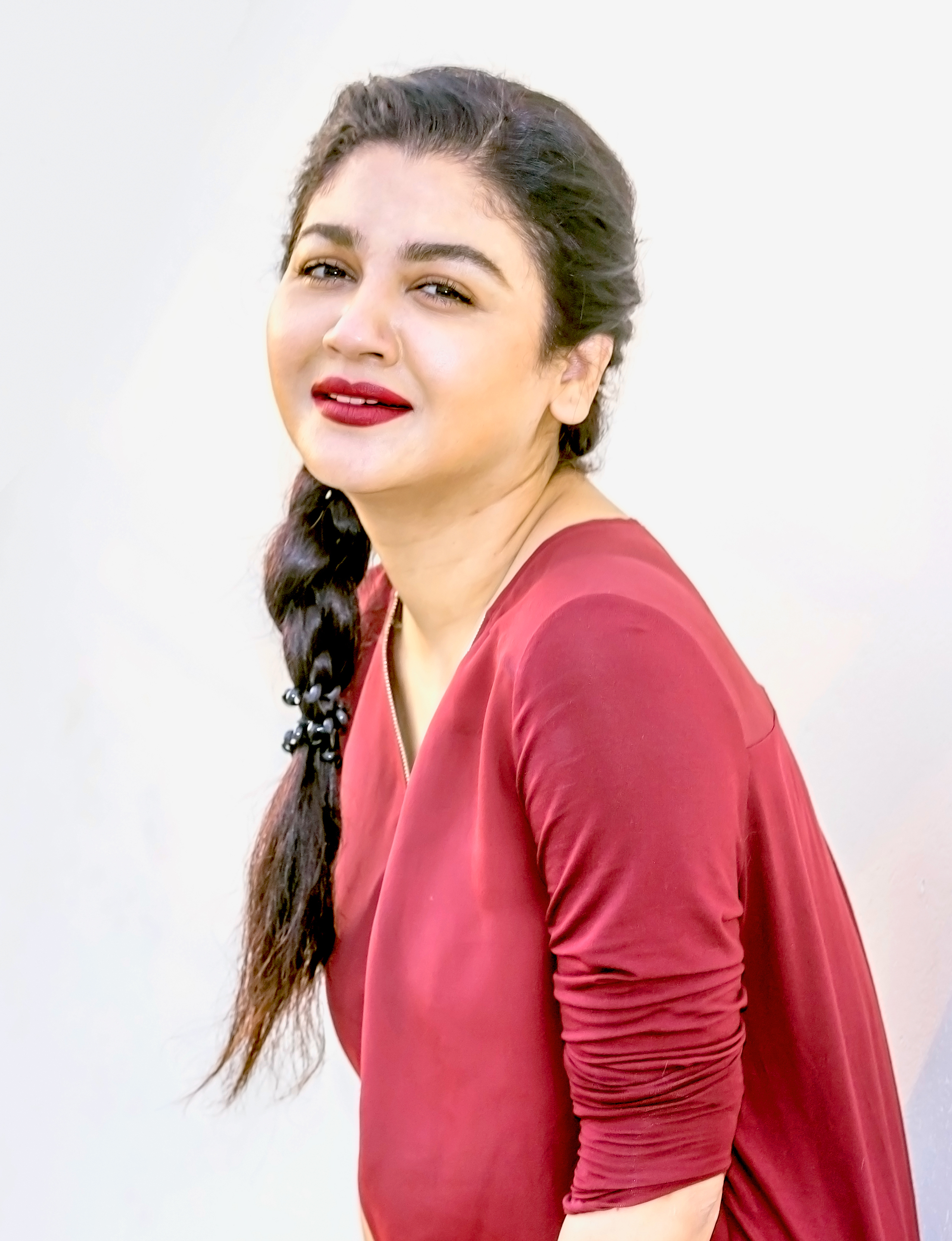
Jaya Ahsan, Best Supporting Actress

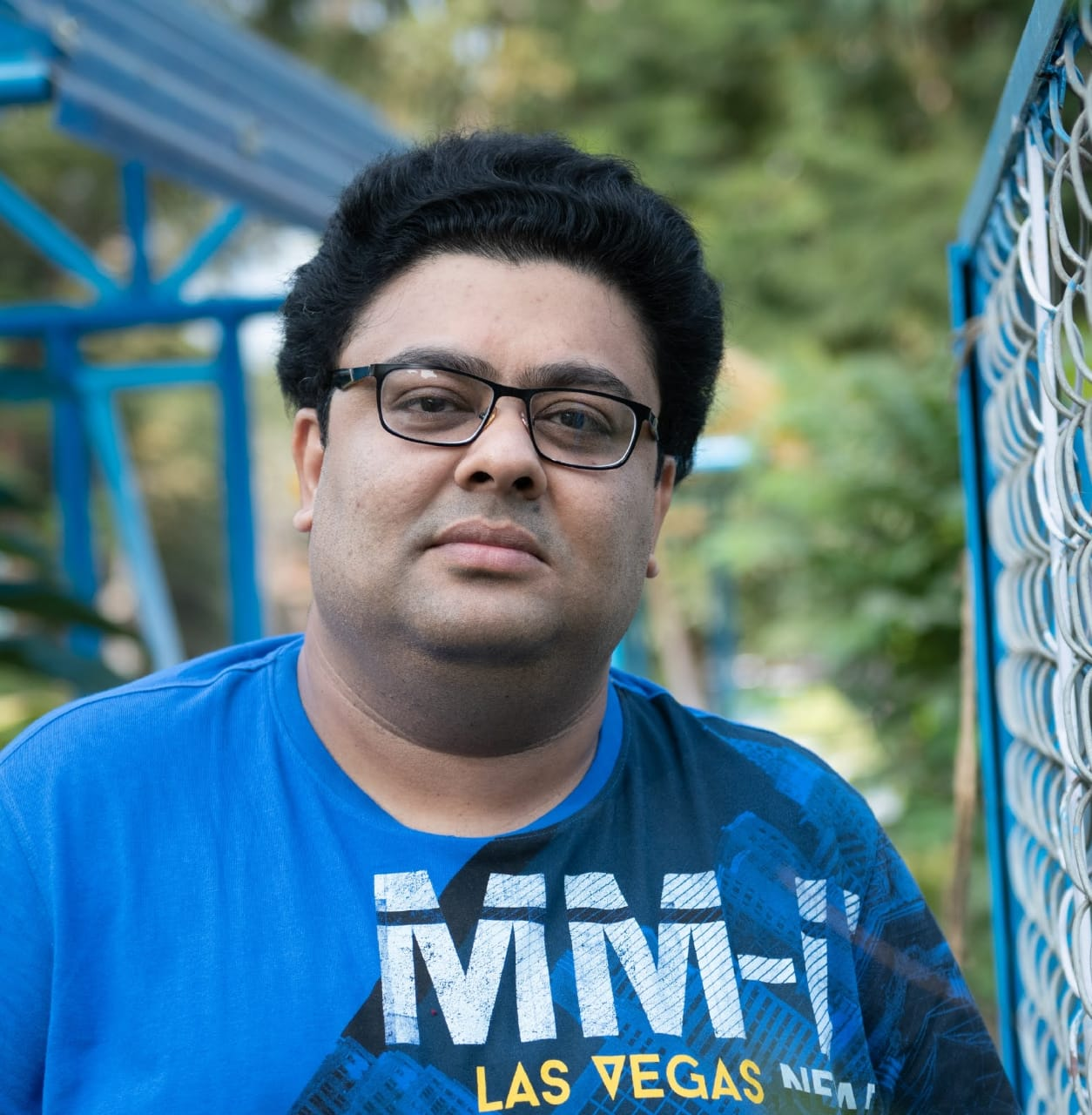
Ambarish Bhattacharya, Best Supporting Actor co-winner

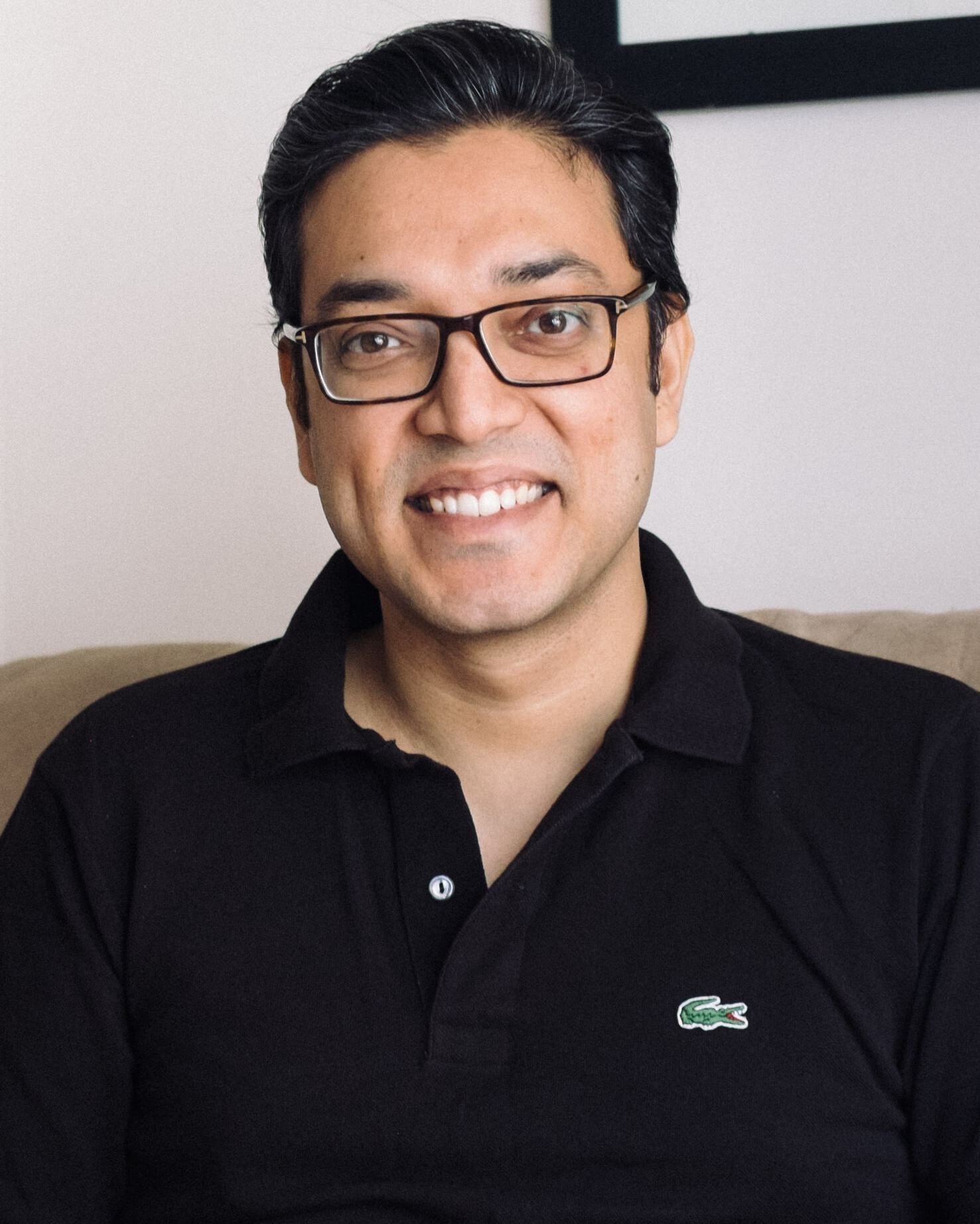
Anupam Roy, Best Music Composer & Best Lyricist

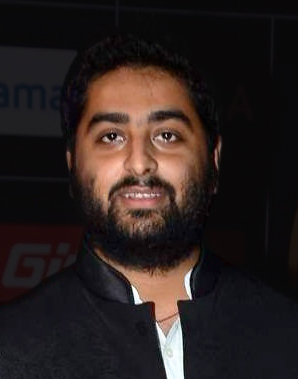
Arijit Singh, Best Male Playback Singer

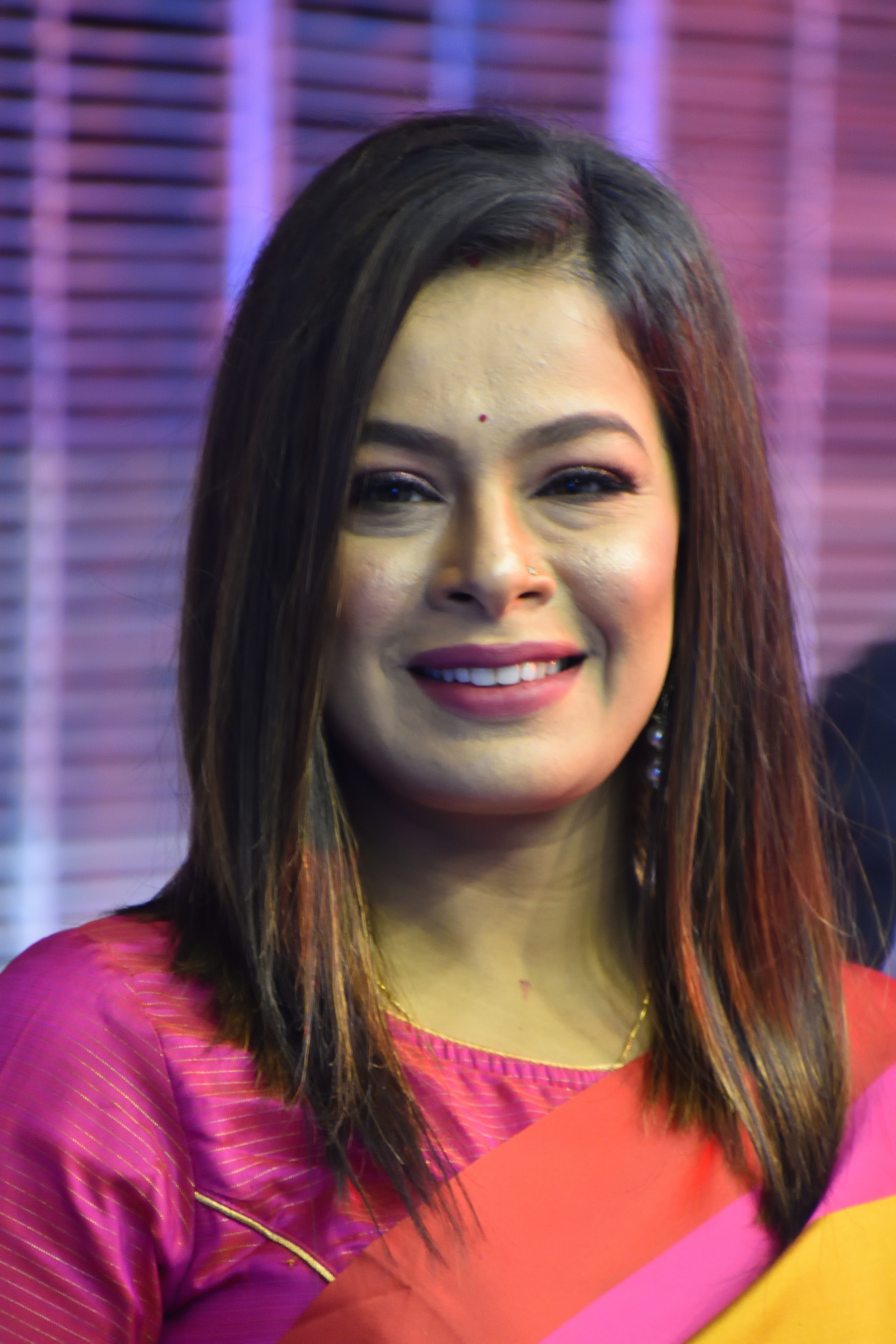
Iman Chakraborty, Best Female Playback Singer

=== Popular Awards ===
Best Film		Best Director
Ardhangini – Surinder Films; Bagha Jatin – Dev Entertainment Ventures; Dawshom Awbotaar – Shree Venkatesh Films; Kabuliwala – Shree Venkatesh Films; Pradhan – Dev Entertainment Ventures; Raktabeej – Windows Production		Atanu Ghosh – Shesh Pata; Arun Roy – Bagha Jatin; Avijit Sen – Pradhan; Kaushik Ganguly – Ardhangini; Nandita Roy & Shiboprosad Mukherjee – Raktabeej; Srijit Mukherji – Dawshom Awbotaar; Suman Ghosh – Kabuliwala
Best Actor		Best Actress
Prosenjit Chatterjee – Shesh Pata as Balmiki Sengupta; Anirban Chakrabarty – The Eken: Ruddhaswas Rajasthan as Ekendra Sen; Dev – Bagha Jatin as Bagha Jatin; Dev – Pradhan as Deepak Pradhan; Jeet – Manush as NCB Officer Arjun Mukherjee / Victor; Mithun Chakraborty – Kabuliwala as Rehmat Khan; Parambrata Chatterjee – Shibpur as Sultan Ahmed		Churni Ganguly – Ardhangini as Subhra Chatterjee; Jaya Ahsan – Dawshom Awbotaar as Moitreyee Ghatak; Koel Mallick – Jongole Mitin Mashi as Mitin Mashi; Ritabhari – Fatafati as Phoollari K. Bhaduri; Solanki Roy – Shohorer Ushnotomo Din E as RJ Anindita; Swastika Mukherjee – Shibpur as Mandira Biswas
Best Supporting Actor		Best Supporting Actress
Ambarish Bhattacharya – Ardhangini as Sukanta Chatterjee; Kaushik Ganguly – Aaro Ek Prithibi as Shrikanta Munshi; Anirban Bhattacharya – Dawshom Awbotaar as ACP Poddar; Anirban Chakrabarty – Pradhan as Jatileshwar Mukherjee; Jisshu Sengupta – Dawshom Awbotaar as Bishwarup Bardhan; Sohel Mondal – Mayar Jonjal as Satya; Vikram Chatterjee – Shesh Pata as Shaunak		Jaya Ahsan – Ardhangini as Meghna Mustafi; Anashua Majumdar – Raktabeej as Gauri Mukherjee; Aparajita Adhya – Cheeni 2 as Mishti Mukherjee; Mallika Mazumder – Niharika as Deepa's Aunt; Srabanti Chatterjee – Kaberi Antardhan as Kaberi Bhattacharya
Debut Awards
Best Male Debut	Best Female Debut	Best Debut Director
Sohel Mondal – Mayar Jonjal as Satya	Tasnia Farin – Aaro Ek Prithibi as Prateeksha; Soumitrisha Kundu – Pradhan as Rumi Pradhan; Sreeja Dutta – Bagha Jatin as Indubala Banerjee	Sumantra Roy – Ghasjomi; Aritra Sen – Ghore Pherar Gaan; Paroma Neotia – Mitthye Premer Gaan; Srijato – Manobjomin
Writing Awards
Best Story	Best Screenplay	Best Dialogue
Atanu Ghosh – Shesh Pata; Kaushik Ganguly – Ardhangini; Kaushik Ganguly – Kaberi Antardhan; Nandita Roy & Shiboprosad Mukherjee – Raktabeej	Indranil Roychowdhury & Sugata Sinha – Mayar Jonjal; Atanu Ghosh – Shesh Pata; Srijit Mukherji – Dawshom Awbotaar; Zinia Sen & Sarbari Ghoshal – Raktabeej	Atanu Ghosh – Shesh Pata; Kaushik Ganguly – Ardhangini; Sreejib – Kabuliwala; Srijit Mukherji – Dawshom Awbotaar
Music Awards
Best Music Director		Best Lyricist
Anupam Roy – Dawshom Awbotaar; Anupam Roy – Ardhangini; Bickram Ghosh – Maayakumari; Indraadip Dasgupta – Kabuliwala; Kuntal De, Ranajoy Bhattacharjee & Soumya Rit – Mitthye Premer Gaan; Nabarun Bose & Akash Chakraborty – Shohorer Ushnotomo Din E		Anupam Roy – "Alada Alada" – Ardhangini; Anupam Roy – "Aami Shei Manushta Aar Nei" – Dawshom Awbotaar; Aritra Sengupta & Ranajoy Bhattacharjee – "Nirabotay Chhilo" – Mitthye Premer Gaan; Kaushik Ganguly – "Aami Aar O" – Palan; Ritam Sen – "Jani Okaron" – Fatafati
Best Playback Singer – Male		Best Playback Singer – Female
Arijit Singh – "Bhaabo Jodi" – Kabuliwala; Anupam Roy – "Aami Shei Manushta Aar Nei" – Dawshom Awbotaar; Anupam Roy – "Phire Esho" – Pradhan; Arijit Singh – "Jiya Tui Chara" – Biye Bibhrat; Ishan Mitra & Ranajoy Bhattacharjee – "Nirobotay Chhilo" – Mitthye Premer Gaan; Mahtim Shakib – "Tumi Jantei Paronaa" – Cheeni 2; Rupam Islam – "Shesh Bole Kichu Achey Ki" – Shesh Pata		Abarna Roy – "Moloya Batashe" – Niharika; Iman Chakraborty – "Alada Alada" – Ardhangini; Antara Mitra – "Jani Okaron" – Fatafati; Antara Nandy & Ankita Nandy – "Nakku Nakur Na Jao" – Raktabeej; Gargi Roychowdhury – "Amar Jwoleni Aalo" – Shesh Pata

=== Critics' awards ===
Best Film (Best Director)
Indranil Roychowdhury – Mayar Jonjal; Indrasis Acharya – Niharika; Kaushik Ganguly – Palan; Atanu Ghosh – Shesh Pata; Aritra Sen – Shohorer Ushnotomo Din E
Best Actor	Best Actress
Mithun Chakraborty – Kabuliwala as Rehmat Khan; Anjan Dutt – Palan as Anjan Sen; Prosenjit Chatterjee – Shesh Pata as Balmiki Sengupta; Ritwick Chakraborty – Mayar Jonjal as Chandan / Chandu; Silajit Majumdar – Niharika as Akash Chatterjee; Subrat Dutta – Samaresh Basu-R Projapoti as Sukhen	Swastika Mukherjee – Shibpur as Mandira Biswas; Anuradha Mukherjee – Niharika as Deepa; Aupee Karim – Mayar Jonjal as Shoma C.; Gargi Roychowdhury – Shesh Pata as Medha Ray; Mamata Shankar – Palan as Mamata Sen; Tasnia Farin – Aaro Ek Prithibi as Prateeksha

=== Special awards ===
Lifetime Achievement Award
- Prabhat Roy

=== Technical Awards ===
Best Editing	Best Production Design	Best Cinematography
Sumit Ghosh – Mayar Jonjal; Amir Mondal – Samaresh Basu-R Projapoti; Malay Laha – Raktabeej; Pranoy Dasgupta – Dawshom Awbotaar; Sujay Datta Ray – Shesh Pata; Sumantra Roy – Ghasjomi	Tanmoy Chakraborty – Kabuliwala; Bablu Singha – Bagha Jatin; Gautam Basu – Shesh Pata; Kaushik Das – Mayar Jonjal; Nafisa Ali Khatun – Raktabeej; Shibaji Pal – Dawshom Awbotaar	Indranil Mukherjee – Mayar Jonjal; Pratip Mukhopadhyay – Raktabeej; Rana Pratap Karforma – Ghasjomi; Santanu De – Niharika; Soumik Haldar – Dawshom Awbotaar; Soumik Haldar – Shesh Pata; Subhankar Bhar – Kabuliwala
Best Sound Design	Best Background Score	Best Costume
Subhadeep Sengupta – Mayar Jonjal; Amit Kumar Datta – Bagha Jatin; Anindit Ray & Adeep Singh Manki – Shesh Pata; Anindit Ray & Adeep Singh Manki – Dawshom Awbotaar; Dipankar Chaki – Raktabeej; Sukanta Mazumder – Niharika	Debojyoti Mishra – Shesh Pata; Amit Chatterjee – Ardhangini; Indraadip Dasgupta – Dawshom Awbotaar; Indraadip Dasgupta – Kabuliwala; Joy Sarkar – Niharika; Nilayan Chatterjee – Baghajatin; Santajit Chatterjee – Ghasjomi	Ritarupa Bhattacharya – Mayar Jonjal; Jayanti Sen – Baghajatin; Sanchita Bhattacharjee – Bogla Mama Jug Jug Jiyo; Sulagna Choudhury & Nighat Iman – Ardhangini

== Superlatives ==
Multiple nominations
Nominations	Film
16	Shesh Pata
15	Dawshom Awbotaar
11	Ardhangini
11	Raktabeej
10	Kabuliwala
8	Baghajatin
8	Mayar Jonjal
6	Niharika
6	Pradhan
4	Mitthye Premer Gaan
3	Aaro Ek Prithibi

Multiple wins
Awards	Film
6	Ardhangini
6	Mayar Jonjal
5	Shesh Pata
2	Aaro Ek Prithibi
2	Niharika
