= West Bengal Film Journalists' Association Award for Best Female Playback Singer =

Annual Indian film award

The West Bengal Film Journalists' Association Award for Best Female Playback Singer is given annually by WBFJA as a part of its West Bengal Film Journalists' Association Awards for Bengali films. It recognizes the best female playback singer for Bengali films released in the previous year.

== Superlatives ==
Category	Name	Superlative
Most Awards	Shreya Ghoshal; Iman Chakraborty	2 awards
Most Nominations	Shreya Ghoshal	8 nominations

== List of winners and nominations ==
- 2017 Iman Chakraborty – "Tumi Jaake Bhalobasho" from Praktan
  - Madhubanti Bagchi - "Tomake Chai" from Gangster
  - Shreya Ghoshal - "Tomake Chuye Dilam" from Bastu-Shaap
- 2018 Chandrani Banerjee - "Tomake Bujhina Priyo" from Projapoti Biskut
  - Nikhita Gandhi - "Bangali Maacher Jhol" from Maacher Jhol
  - Nikhita Gandhi - "Tomra Ekhono Ki" from Meghnad Badh Rahasya
  - Lagnajita Chakraborty – "Ebhabe Golpo Hok" from Bibaho Diaries
  - Somchanda Bhattacharya - "Agomonir Gaan" from Durga Sohay
  - Shalmali Kholgade - "Aladdin" from One
- 2019 Nikhita Gandhi - "Saiyo re" from Uronchondi
  - Lagnajita Chakraborty – "Ora Moner Gopon" from Ghare And Baire
  - Surangana Bandyopadhyay - "Aaloshyo" from Uma
  - Amrita Singh - "Bhule Jeo" from Generation Ami
  - Paloma Majumder - "Lokkhiti" from Drishtikone
  - Sahana Bajpaie - "Maharajo" from Ek Je Chhilo Raja
  - Shreya Ghoshal - "Esho Hey" from Ek Je Chhilo Raja
- 2020 Lagnajita Chakraborty for "Preme Pora Baron" from Sweater
  - Meghna Mishra for "Hazar Bochor" from Tritiya Adhyay
  - Shreya Ghoshal for "Pran Dite Chai" from Parineeta
  - Monali Thakur for "Bolo Na Radhika" from Shah Jahan Regency
  - Somlata Acharyya for "Aay Behestey Ke Jabi Aaay" from Ahaa Re
  - Nikhita Gandhi for "Trippy Lage" from Password
- 2021 Surangana Bandopadhyay for "Kon Gopone" from Brahma Janen Gopon Kommoti
  - Iman Chakraborty for "Aami Radha Moto" from Asur
  - Subhamita Banerjee for "Ki Naamey Daaki" from Cheeni
  - Lagnajita Chakraborty for "Tomar Chokher Shitolpati" from Cheeni
- 2022 Shreya Ghoshal for "Kachhe Thako" from Prem Tame
  - Monali Thakur for "Chup Kore Tui" from Ei Ami Renu
  - Lagnajita Chakraborty for "Behaya" from Ekannoborti
- 2023 Shreya Ghoshal for "Bhalobashar Morshum" from X=Prem
  - Iman Chakraborty, Ananya Bhattacharjee & Upali Chattopadhyay for "Tapa Tini" from Belashuru
  - Mekhla Dasgupta for "Mon Kemoner Janmodin" from Hridpindo
  - Sahana Bajpaie for "Shaajo Shaajao" from Ballabhpurer Roopkotha
- 2024 Iman Chakraborty for "Alada Alada" from Ardhangini
  - Shreya Ghoshal for "Toka Dile Bhenge Jabe" from Manobjomin
  - Madhubanti Bacchi for "Madhu Mashe" from Maayakumari
  - Antara Mitra for "Jani Okaron" from Fatafati
- 2025 Antara Mitra for "Kishori" from Khadaan
  - Shreya Ghoshal for "Tui Amar Hobi Na" from Ajogyo
  - Shreya Ghoshal for "Elomelo Raat" from Babli
  - Sohini Saha for "Phiraiyya Dao" from Khadaan
- 2026 Jayati Chakraborty for "Dyakho Dyakho Kanaiye" from Lawho Gouranger Naam Re
  - Iman Chakraborty for "Sujan Majhi Re" from Sharthopor
  - Madhubanti Bagchi for "Monero Toh Mon Bhalo Nei" from Grihapravesh
  - Suchismita Chakraborty for "Jhimli Laage Re" from Raghu Dakat
  - Pritha Chatterjee for "Uttor Shaaji" from Goodbye Mountain

== See also ==
- West Bengal Film Journalists' Association Awards
- Cinema of India
