= Debi (TV series) =

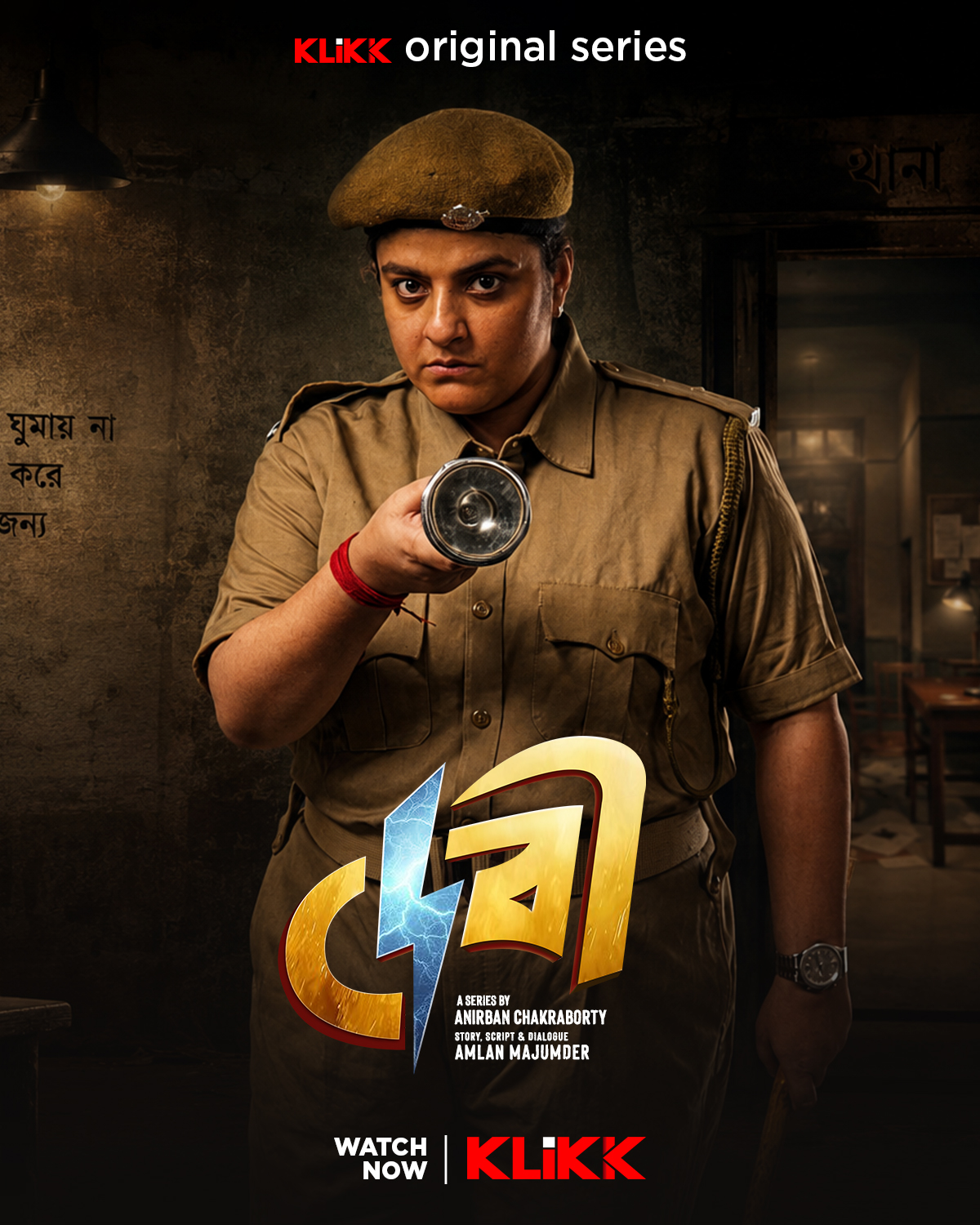
- Genre: Mystery, crime
- Story by: Amlan Majumder
- Directed by: Anirban Chakraborty
- Starring: Arindam Ganguly, Debasish Das, Avery Singha Roy, Anirban Bhattacharya, Sagarika Roy, Debipriya Sarkar
- Music by: Avijit Kundu
- Country of origin: India
- Original language: Bengali
- No. of seasons: 1
- No. of episodes: 5

Production
- Producer: Santanu Chatterjee
- Cinematography: Anir

Original release
- Release: May 27, 2026

Debi is a 2026 Indian Bengali psychological thriller web series directed by Anirban Chakraborty. It is written by Amlan Majumder.

The series main starring Arindam Ganguly, Debasish Das, Avery Singha Roy, Anirban Bhattacharya, Sagarika Roy, and Debipriya Sarkar. The web series is produced by Santanu Chatterjee under Films and Frames.

== Synopsis ==
When actress Sneha goes missing, official police inquiries hit a dead end, prompting a constable named Debi to launch a parallel investigation. As Debi connects the clues, she unravels a web of deceit. The plot centers on a fraudulent spiritual leader, Hemant Maharaj, who wants to bury an incriminating video. To do this, he forms an alliance with Chhanda Masi, the constable's house help, who is seeking revenge for her son's suicide. Together, they plot a murder.

== Cast ==
- Arindam Ganguly as Hemanta Maharaj
- Debasish Das as Manoj
- Avery Singha Roy as Debi
- Anirban Bhattacharya as Naren Bhadra
- Sagarika Roy as Chhanda
- Debipriya Sarkar as Sneha
- Amlan Majumder as Sumanta
- Kaushik Seal as Abhik

== Episodes ==
No.	Title	Directed by	Original release date
1	"Antardhan"	Anirban Chakraborty	27 May 2026
When a rising actress is abducted, a disgraced constable uncovers a chilling mystery linking a powerful spiritual guru to the dark underbelly of fame and deception.
2	"Sutro"	Anirban Chakraborty	27 May 2026
Young actress Sneha goes missing, official police inquiries hit a dead end, prompting an observant but often-ridiculed constable named Debi to launch a parallel investigation.
3	"Khatka"	Anirban Chakraborty	27 May 2026
As secrets unravel around Sneha's true identity, a missing earring turns suspicion toward Debi's trusted caregiver, Chhanda Masi.
4	"Top"	Anirban Chakraborty	27 May 2026
As Debi sets a clever trap using false clues, a tense midnight stakeout begins to catch the killer returning to the crime scene.
5	"Pratisodh"	Anirban Chakraborty	27 May 2026
Debi uncovers a deadly web of revenge and hidden scandals, but one missing clue keeps the mystery alive.
