= O Abhagi =

2024 Indian Bengali film

- O Abhagi Film's official Poster
- Directed by: Anirban Chakraborty
- Written by: Anirban Chakraborty
- Screenplay by: Anirban Chakraborty
- Story by: Anirban Chakraborty
- Based on: Based on Sarat Chandra Chattopadhyay's short story 'Abhagir Swargo'
- Produced by: Dr. Prabir Bhaumik
- Starring: Rafiath Rashid Mithila, Subrat Dutta, Debjani Chatterjee, Ishan Mazumder, Sayan Ghosh, Jinia Pande, Krishna Banerjee, and Sourav Halder.
- Cinematography: Malay Mondal
- Edited by: Sujay Datta Ray
- Music by: Mousumi Chatterjee
- Production company: Swabhumi Entertainment
- Distributed by: Equinox Film City
- Release date: 29 March 2024
- Running time: 116 minutes
- Country: India
- Language: Bengali

O Abhagi is a 2024 Indian Bengali-language film directed by Anirban Chakraborty. The film is based on Sarat Chandra Chattopadhyay's short story 'Abhagir Swargo' and stars Rafiath Rashid Mithila in the lead role. Presented by Swabhumi Entertainment and produced by Dr. Prabir Bhaumik. O Abhagi was released all over West Bengal on 29 March 2024.

== Synopsis ==
Abhagi, a lower cast woman, is a poor village woman, left by her husband, and lives with her son, Kangali, in a small mud hut. They are happy with each other. Abhagi falls in love with Yamraj when she sees him in a play, and is affected by his words. He only takes good-looking women in his chariot to burn them in a fire. Abhagi has always dreamed of fire from his son after death. After the death of Ginnima, Abhagi sees a chariot coming out of the sky in the smoke where Ginnima was burned, and it takes her away to the sky. Abhagi dreams of her death just like Ginnima's. On the day of her death, she gets high fever and dies. Before her death, Abhagi tells her son that she wishes for Sindoor and alta and that he will burn her in the wood. Kangali fulfils all her wishes, but he can't arrange the wood for burning. Everyone scolds him saying that he doesn't have to burn his mother in wood as she is lower cast. He has to bury his mother's dead body. The fire, Abhagi wished all her life, now is in the eyes of Kangali.

== Cast ==
- Rafiath Rashid Mithila
- Subrat Dutta

== Releases ==
- Official Teaser of O Abhagi released on 7 March 2024.
- Official Trailer Released on 15 March 2024.
- Film Released on 29th Match 2024.

== Reception ==
A review noted, "The spoken language of the film is totally un-Sarat Chandra-esque: major use of ‘cuss words’ and abusive language to some ears could sound too harsh, especially for those raised in a ‘bhadro’ atmosphere and with Victorian morals, who are either unaware or prefer to overlook the subaltern lingo. Anirban has come out of the mould of following the story to a T. He has put in his interpretation, added characters of his own and created nuances."
