= Aador =

2023 Indian Bengali film

- Directed by: Debdut Ghosh
- Written by: Dedbut Ghosh
- Based on: Adorini by Prabhat Kumar Mukhobadhyay
- Starring: Rajatava Dutta
- Release date: 26 June 2023
- Running time: 100 minutes
- Country: India
- Language: Bengali

Aador is a 2023 Indian Bengali-language drama film directed by Debdut Ghosh. The film is based on the Bengali-language short story Adorini by Prabhat Kumar Mukhopadhyay. The film stars Rajatava Dutta in the lead role and Sabyasachi Chakrabarty, Manasi Sinha, Tulika Bose, Basabdatta Chatterjee, Pradeep Chakraborty, and Biplab Banerjee in supporting roles.

== Cast ==
- Rajatava Dutta
- Manasi Sinha
- Tulika Bose
- Basabdatta Chatterjee
- Pradeep Chakraborty
- Biplab Banerjee
- Sabyasachi Chakrabarty
