= Bala Nacho To Dekhi =

2022 single by Iman Chakraborty

"Bala Nacho To Dekhi (Sohag Chand)"

Single by Iman Chakraborty
- Language: Bengali
- Released: February 2, 2022
- Genre: Folk
- Length: 3:50
- Label: Saregama
- Composer: Nilanjan Ghosh
- Producer: Nilanjan Ghosh

Music video
- "Bala Nacho To Dekhi" on YouTube

"Bala Nacho To Dekhi" is a single by Bengali singer Iman Chakraborty. Its music was composed and arranged by Nilanjan Ghosh. The lyricist(s) are credited to be traditional writers. An Indian folk song based on a traditional wedding song, the single has a tempo of 62 beats per minute. A remix of the single was released in 2023, with music by Sunny Karmakar.

The song was released on February 2, 2022, with an accompanying music video released the next day on February 3. The video featured Chakraborty and Roshni Bhattacharya besides other actors during a wedding ceremony. "Bala Nacho To Dekhi" exerted influence on social media and dancing with its gaining popularity.

== Overview ==
=== Music video ===
On February 2, 2022, Iman Chakraborty released her single "Bala Nacho To Dekhi" (also called Sohag Chand Badani Dhani Nacho To Dekhi), which coincided with the wedding season of Bengalis. The music video was released on February 3, which featured Roshni Bhattacharya along with the singer Chakraborty. The music video was set in the context of a wedding, specifically the ceremony of Gaye holud. In the music video's wedding, Bala Nacho To Dekhi was featured. The music video was released under the label of Saregama Originals, a subsidiary of Saregama India Ltd., with Roshni Bhattacharya playing of the role of the bride in the video. Bhattacharya and Chakraborty informed about the release of the single some days before the formal release on February 2. ABP Ananda wrote that Bhattacharya and Chakraborty played the role of two sisters in the video, looking at the last scene.

=== Influence ===
Manali Manisha Dey and Anindita Raychaudhury, actresses of Bengali television shows and serials, posted a video on social media dancing to the then newly-released song, on February 9, 2022. The video was captioned: "Song of a friend. And we accepted the challenge." The video was in response to the "Bala Nacho To Dekhi challenge", where participants were to dance with a hook step to the beat of the song. Dey and Raychaudhury were new additions to the participants attempting the challenge.

With the popularity of the song growing on social media, several Tollywood actors and actresses attempted the challenge and danced to the song. Devlina Kumar, the wife of film director Gourab Chatterjee, posted a video on social media dancing to the song on asking of Iman Chakraborty, captioned "As I promised Iman. This is the reel". ABP Ananda remarked she was not the first to the challenge.

Mahua Moitra, a Member of Parliament of Trinamool Congress, shared a video of her dancing with other people during a procession of celebrations of Mahapanchami (fifth day of Durga Puja) in Nadia district of West Bengal. In the video, Moitra walked and danced with other women to the folk song lyrics "Sohag chand bodoni dhoni nacho to dekhi", which was the original traditional song. The video was captioned as: "Lovely moments from Mahapanchami celebrations in Nadia". She also sang the song in the video.
