= Iman Chakraborty =

Indian singer (born 1989)

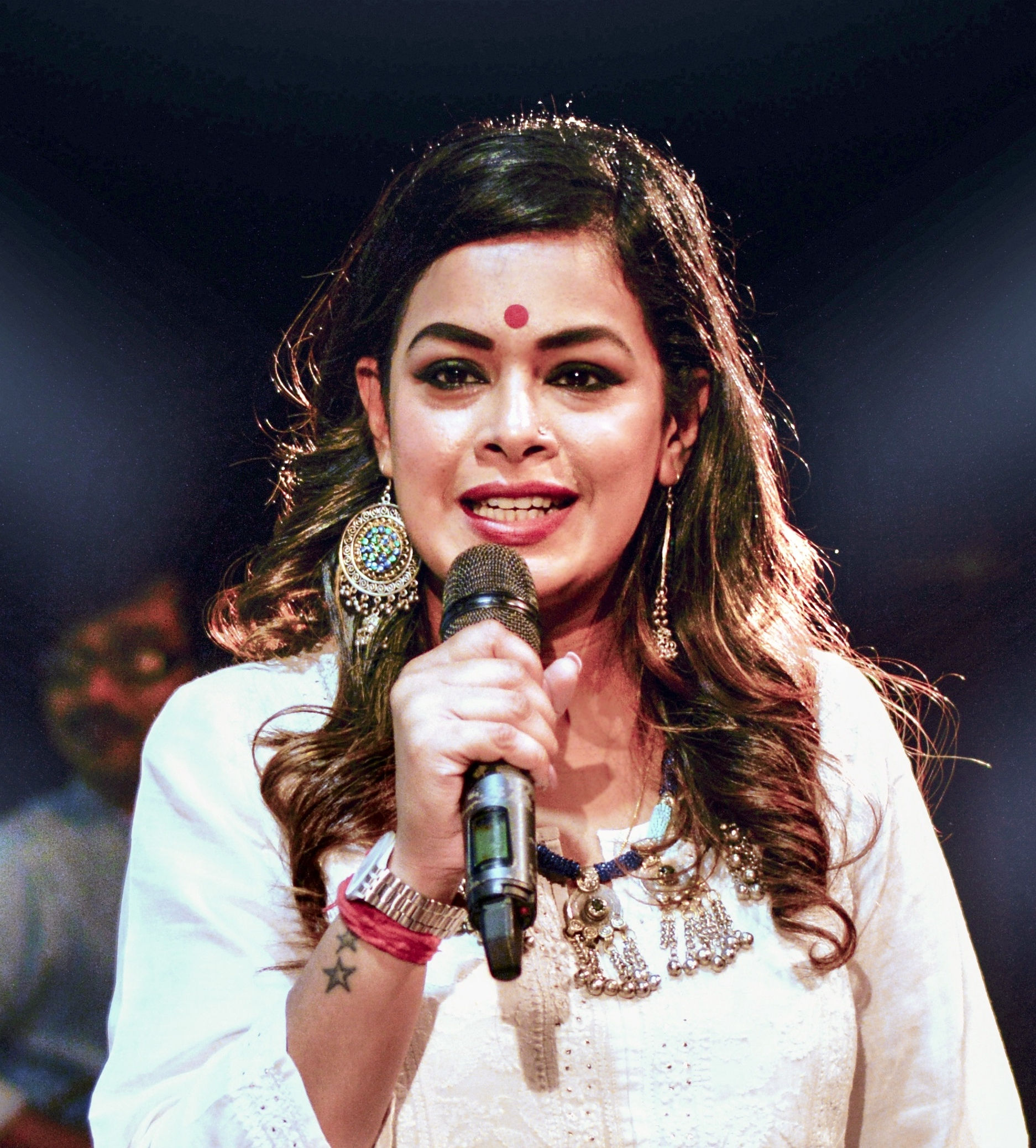
- Chakraborty performing in 2018

Background information
- Born: 13 September 1989 (age 37); Liluah, Howrah, West Bengal, India
- Genres: Filmi, Independent music, Rabindrasangeet
- Occupations: Singer; actress
- Instruments: Vocals; Indian harmonium

Iman Chakraborty (born 13 September 1989) is an Indian singer and actress. Throughout her career, she has received a National Film Award, two Filmfare Award Bangla, as well as a nomination for an Academy Award. Accordingly, she is one of the few singers who have won a national award for the debut film song in India.

== Early life and career ==
Iman was born in the town Liluah of the Howrah district of the West Bengal state of India. During her growing up days she learnt music from her late mother Trishna Chakraborty and got inclined towards literary works of Rabindranath Tagore.

Her first break came when she approached Indian record label company Saregama, which decided to produce her first album 'Bosh te dio kachhe' in Bengali language. The album consisted of renditions of a few songs by Tagore. The album caught the eyes of composer Anupam Roy, who wanted to experiment with a fresh voice, with new vocal and tonal qualities, for his composition. She subsequently sang Roy's Bengali film song composition "Tumi Jaake Bhalobasho" which was her debut film song. The song earned her the National Film Award for Best Female Playback Singer.

In December 2018, she released the song "Monn", the title song of the Tollywood album Monn. It was a duet with singer Sarbajit Ghosh, who is also the music director, composer, lyricist and producer of the song. In February 2022, she released the single "Bala Nacho To Dekhi" which became a highly popular song in Bengali.

== Musical influences ==
Chakraborty is heavily inspired by Rabindranath Tagore.

== Discography ==
Year	Film	Song	Composer	Lyricist	Co-singer(s)	Note
2016	Praktan	Tumi Jake Bhalobasho	Anupam Roy	Anupam Roy	Anupam Roy	Won National Film Award for Best Female Playback Singer at the 64th National Film Awards
2017	Shesh Chithi	Ami Tomar Premey	Rabindranath Tagore	Rabindranath Tagore		
2018	Drishtikone	Amar Dukkhogulo (Female Version)	Anupam Roy	Anupam Roy		
2018	Guptodhoner Sondhane	Rangiye Diye Jao	Rabindranath Tagore	Rabindranath Tagore		
2018	Flat No 609	Kichu Kichu Kotha (Female)	Ratul Shankar	Ambarish		
2019	Borof	Dekha Hobe	Pandit Debojyoti Bose	Traditional		
2019	Sweater	Era Sukher Lagi	Rabindranath Tagore	Rabindranath Tagore		
2019	Brishti Tomakey Dilam	Aloy Phera Hoyni	Debojyoti Mishra	Debojyoti Mishra		
2019	Googly	Katha Chilo Kato	Prasen	Ritam Sen	Timir Biswas	
2019	Mukherjee Dar Bou	O Jibon Tomar Sathe	Pijush Chakraborty	Pijush Chakraborty		
2019	Dupur Thakurpo 3	Le Le Lebu	Pijush Chakraborty	Pijush Chakraborty		
2019	Ghoon	Hariye Jete Hoy (Female)	Prosenjit Mohapatra	Rajib Dutta		
2020	Asur	Radha	Bickram Ghosh	Sugato Guha	Shovan Ganguly	
2020	Dwitiyo Purush	Je Kwata Din (Reprise)	Anupam Roy	Anupam Roy		
2020	Sraboner Dhara	Asthir Somoy	Pijush Chakraborty	Pijush Chakraborty		
2020	Sraboner Dhara	Asthir Somoy Reprise	Pijush Chakraborty	Pijush Chakraborty	Rupankar Bagchi	
2020	Rawkto Rawhoshyo	Kawthar Kawtha	Nabarun Bose	Soukarya Ghosal		
2021	Binisutoy	Mon	Debojyoti Mishra	Debojyoti Mishra		
2021	Lockdown	Tomar Kopaler Shitghume (Female Version)	Shovan Ganguly	Shovan Ganguly		
2021	Golondaaj	Gobindo Murari	Bickram Ghosh	Srijato		
2022	Mahananda	Maati Amar	Bickram Ghosh	Shubhendu Das Munshi		
2022	Belashuru	Tapa Tini	Anindya Chattopadhyay	Anindya Chattopadhyay	Anindya Chattopadhyay	
2022	Habji Gabji	Dure	Indraadip Dasgupta	Srijato	Papon	
2022	Kuler Achaar	Ami Amar Modhye	Anupam Roy	Anupam Roy		
2022	Byomkesh Hotyamancha	Ke Jaane Cholona	Bickram Ghosh	Sugata Guha		
2022	Karnasubarner Guptodhon	Palash Palash Mon	Bickram Ghosh	Sugata Guha	Shovan Ganguly	
2022	Boudi Canteen	Tiring Biring	Joy Sarkar	Dipangshu Acharya	Arkadeep Mishra	
2023	Indubala Bhaater Hotel	Pakhider Smriti (Orchestratal Version)	Amit Chatterjee	Debaloy Bhattacharya and Atul Prosad Sen		
2023	Love Marriage	Acho Kemon	Savvy	Dipangshu Acharya		
2023	Homestay Murders	Shesh Nahi Je	Rabindranath Tagore	Rabindranath Tagore		
2023	Ardhangini	Alada Alada	Anupam Roy	Anupam Roy		Won Filmfare Award Bangla for Best Female Playback Singer at the 7th Filmfare Awards Bangla
2023	Shibpur	Jotobaar Aalo	Rabindranath Tagore	Rabindranath Tagore		
2023	Jongole Nitin Mashi	Dhamsa Dhitan	Bickram Ghosh	Sugato Guha	Timir Biswas	
2023	Bagha Jatin	Jago Re Bagha	Indraadip Dasgupta	Srijato		
2023	Raktabeej	Jaya Jaya Bijoyagaman	Dohar	Shyamapada Bhattacharjee	Dohar	
2024	Mentaal	Ki Ekkhan Gaan Banaise	Keshab Dey	Rajat and Badal	Mika Singh	
2024	Chemistry Mashi	Chemistry Mashi Title Track	Amit Bose and Yash Gupta	Sourav Chakraborty		
2024	Bonbibi	Bonbibir Panchali	Sanai and Dipto Roy	Sanai and Dipto Roy		
2024	Ajogyo	Amar Dukkhe Tumi	Anindya Chattopadhyay	Anindya Chattopadhyay		
2024	Bijoya	Maa Toh Ami Tor	Iman Chakraborty and Pratik Kundu	Pratik Kundu		
2024	Talmar Romeo Juliet	Mon Jaaney Naa	Pijush Chakraborty	Pijush Chakraborty		
2024	5 No Swapnomoy Lane	E Din Aaji (Female Version)	Rabindranath Tagore	Rabindranath Tagore		
2024	Chaalchitro - The Frame Fatale	Bolo Tare	Debojyoti Mishra	Ritam Sen		
2024	Bogla Mama Jug Jug Jiyo	Elo Dol Elo Re	Indraadip Dasgupta	Rangan Chakraborty	Ishan Mitra and Indraadip Dasgupta	
2025	Felubakshi	Tomar Khola Hawa	Rabindranath Tagore	Rabindranath Tagore		
2025	Aarii	Dakat Poreche	Keshab Dey	Badal Paul		
2025	Brahmaarjun	Bharata Bhagya Bidhata	Rabindranath Tagore	Rabindranath Tagore		
2025	Torsha Ekti Nadir Naam	Torsha Nadir Bari	Debojyoti Mishra	Tamoghna Chatterjee	Debojyoti Mishra and Tamoghna Chatterjee	
2025	Durgapur Junction	Ami Oporadhi	Soum-Sree-Tiru	Mandipa Singha	Soum-Sree-Tiru and Mandipa Singha	
2025	Balaram Kando	Pagol Mon	Amlaan A Chakraborty	Debayan Tarafdar	Durnibar Saha, Amlaan A Chakraborty and Debayan Tarafdar	
2025	Grihapravesh	Meghpeon - Female	Indraadip Dasgupta	Prasen		
2025	Shreeman v/s Shreemati	Ami Phirechi Ghore	Ranajoy Bhattacharjee	Ranajoy Bhattacharjee		
2025	'Bhuto'Purbo	Tabo Premo Sudha Roshe	Rabindranath Tagore	Rabindranath Tagore	Danu Saikat Singha	
2025	'Bhuto'Purbo	Amar Mon Maane Na	Rabindranath Tagore	Rabindranath Tagore	Danu Saikat Singha	
2025	Kirtaner Por Kirtan	Babubali Bouma	Sanai	Dhrubojyoti Chakraborty	Paran Bandyopadhyay and Sanai	
2025	Annapurna	Shunyo Shunyo Lage	Pratik Kundu	Suddho Roy		
2025	Raktabeej 2	O Babur Maa	Surojit Chatterjee	Surojit Chatterjee	Surojit Chatterjee	

== Awards ==
Year (Note: Indicates the year of ceremony. Each year is linked to the article about the awards held that year, wherever possible.)	Award Name	Category	Song	Movie	Ref.
2017	National Film Awards	Best Female Playback Singer	"Tumi Jake Bhalobasho"	Praktan	
2017	Filmfare Awards East	Best Female Playback Singer	"Tumi Jake Bhalobasho"	Praktan	
2017	WBFJA Awards	Best Female Playback Singer	"Tumi Jake Bhalobasho"	Praktan	
2024	Filmfare Awards Bangla	Best Female Playback Singer	"Alada Alada"	Ardhangini	
2024	WBFJA Awards	Best Female Playback Singer	"Alada Alada"	Ardhangini	

== Filmography ==
Key
†	Denotes films that have not yet been released

=== Films ===
- All films are in Bengali unless otherwise noted.

Year	Title	Role	Notes	Ref.
2020	Missing	Asha Sen	Short film, Debut	
2020	Brahma Janen Gopon Kommoti	Uma	Special appearance	
2022	NeetiShastra	Zakia		
2026	Family-Wala †	Dancer	Song "Thakur Jamai"; Filming	

=== Web series ===
Year	Title	Role	Platform	Language	Ref.
2022	Shob Choritro	Mrinalini	Klikk	Bengali	
