= Tulika Bose =

American scientist

- Education: Columbia University and University of Cambridge
- Known for: Contributions to the Compact Muon Solenoid (CMS) particle physics experiment at CERN
- Awards: Fellow of the American Physical Society (2019); Alfred P. Sloan Research Fellowship (2012)

Tulika Bose is a professor of physics at the University of Wisconsin-Madison, whose research focuses on developing triggers for experimental searches of new phenomena in high energy physics. Bose is a leader within the Compact Muon Solenoid (CMS) experiment, a CERN collaboration famous for its experimental observation of the Higgs boson in 2012.

== Early life and education ==
Bose completed a B.Sc. in physics at the University of Delhi in India in 1996 and a B.A. in the Natural Sciences Tripos at the University of Cambridge in 1998. Subsequently, Bose performed doctoral research at Columbia University, receiving her PhD in experimental particle physics in 2006. Her PhD dissertation, entitled "Search for B_{s}^{0} oscillations at DØ", describes the collection and analysis of data from the DZero experiment at Fermilab from 2002 to 2005. Bose completed post-doctoral training at Brown University.

== Career ==
Bose was an Assistant Professor (2008–2015) and then an Associate Professor (2015–2018) of Physics at Boston University, before becoming a professor of physics at the University of Wisconsin-Madison in 2018. She was Trigger Coordinator of the CMS experiment from 2014 to 2016, overseeing the triggering and data acquisition of proton-proton collision experiments at CERN. From 2017 to 2019, she was the CMS Physics Co-Coordinator, acting as one of the two scientists who organized reviews of 100 yearly research publications from the CMS experiment.

Bose has served on several international and national committees, including as an elected member of the APS Division of Particles and Field (DPF) executive committee and a member of the Fermilab LHC Physics Center Management Board.

== Awards and honors ==
- Alfred P. Sloan Research Fellowship (2012)
- LHC Physics Center Distinguished Researcher Award (2014)
- Elected fellow of the American Physical Society (2019): “For leadership coordinating the CMS physics program and trigger system, and for contributions to the development of high level triggers and searches for heavy vector bosons and vector-like quarks.”

== Selected publications ==
- “Observation of a new boson at a mass of 125 GeV with the CMS experiment at the LHC”, CMS Collaboration, Phys. Lett. B 716 (2012) 30.
- “Combined results of searches for the standard model Higgs boson in pp collisions at √ s = 7 TeV”, CMS Collaboration, Phys. Lett. B 710 (2012) 26.
- “Search for a W′ or Techni-rho decaying into WZ in pp Collisions at sqrt(s) = 7 TeV”, CMS Collaboration, Phys. Rev. Lett. 109 (2012) 071803.
- “Search for top-quark partners with charge 5/3 in the same-sign dilepton final state”, CMS Collaboration, Phys. Rev. Lett. 112 112 171801 (2014).
- "Search for W' to tb in proton-proton collisions at sqrt(s) = 8 TeV", CMS Collaboration, JHEP 02 (2016) 122.
- “The CMS Trigger system”, CMS Collaboration, JINST 12 (2017) no.01, P01020, arXiv:1609.02366 [physics.ins-det].

Tulika Bose publications indexed by Google Scholar
