= Anirban Chakraborty =

Indian film director and writer

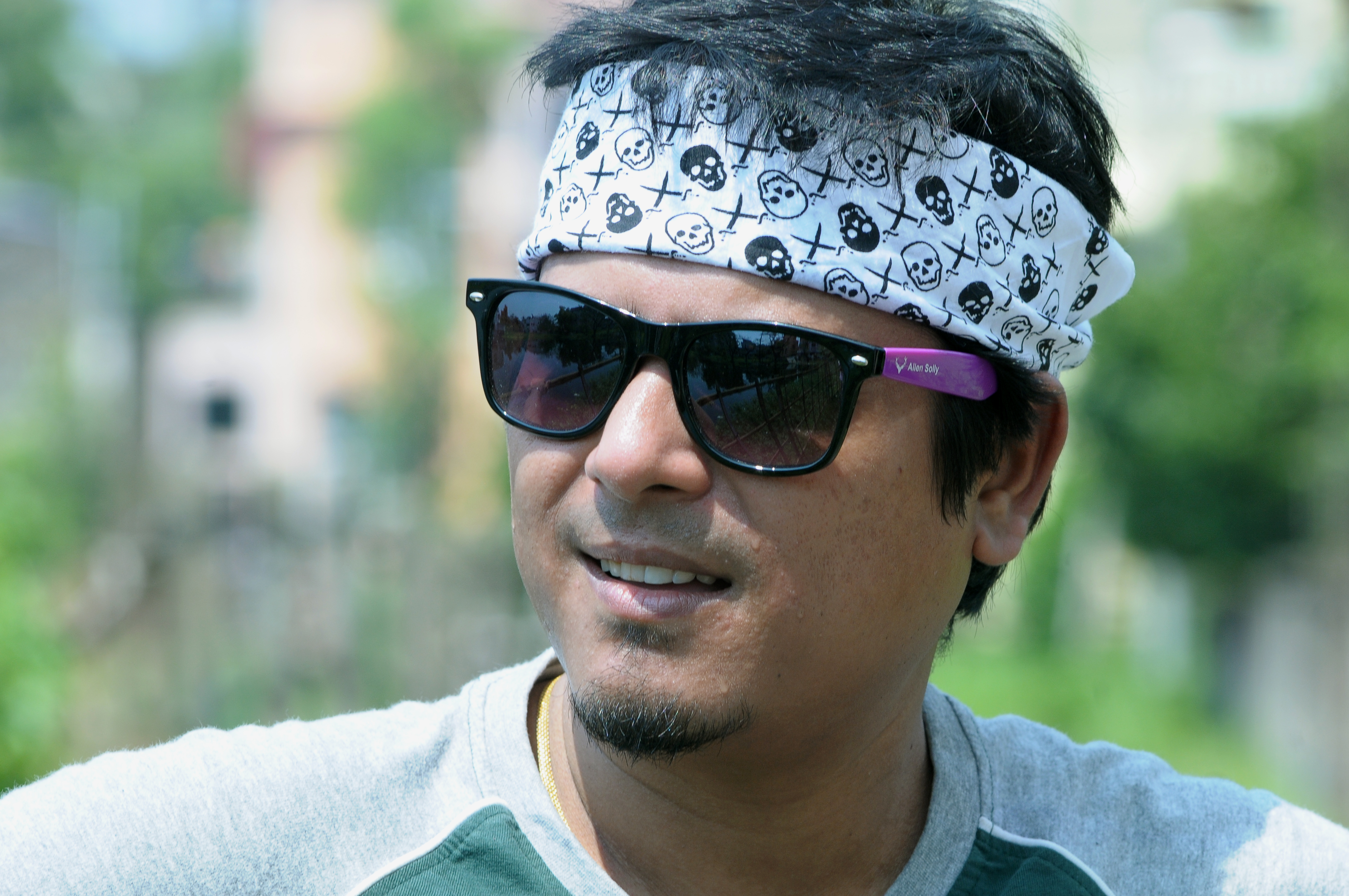
- Chakraborty in 2014
- Occupations: Film Director, Writer
- Notable work: Mullickbari, Piklur Janala, Jah Kala, Bonosundari, Nonte Fonte, O Abhagi, Khacha

Anirban Chakraborty is an Indian film director and writer. He has been active in filmmaking for over a decade, creating feature films, short films, documentaries, and web series.

== Career ==
Anirban Chakraborty's debut feature film, Mullickbari, marked the beginning of a prolific career. His works include several critically acclaimed films:

- Piklur Janala
- Jah Kala
- Bonosundari
- Nonte Fonte (film)
- O Abhagi
- Khacha

== Filmography ==
=== Feature films ===
Filmography of Anirban Chakraborty
Year	Title	Genre	Notes
2014	Mullickbari	Drama	Debut Feature Film
2016	Piklur Janala	Drama	
2017	Jah Kala	Thriller	
2018	Bonosundari	Mystery	
2019	Nonte Fonte	Comedy	Based on the popular comic series. See Nonte Fonte (film)
2021	O Abhagi	Drama	Based on Sarat Chandra Chattopadhyay's Obhagir sworgo.
2025	Khacha	Drama	Starring Mir and Rajatava Dutta and YouTuber cinebapmrinmoy.

=== Other Works ===
- Short films
- Documentaries
- Ad films
- Corporate films
- Web series
