= Nonte Fonte (film) =

2023 Bengali-language comedy drama film

- Directed by: Anirban Chakraborty
- Screenplay by: Amlan Majumder
- Based on: Nonte Fonte by Narayan Debnath
- Produced by: Brij Jalan
- Music by: Anupam Roy
- Production company: Jalan International Films
- Release date: 19 May 2023
- Country: India
- Language: Bengali

Nonte Fonte is a 2023 Indian Bengali-language comedy-drama film directed by Anirban Chakraborty. The film is based on Narayan Debnath's comic strip, Nonte Phonte. The film's screenplay and dialogues were written by Amlan Majumdar, and the music was composed by Anupam Roy. Paran Bandopadhyay, Amlan Majumder, Subhasish Mukherjee and Sumit Samader play the lead roles in the film. The film was released on 19 May 2023.

== Plot ==
Heeragang and Motigang were utterly distressed because of the mischiefs of two 12 year old kids Nonte and Fonte. Their mischievousness gave a really hard time to the villagers. Nonte was brought up by his maternal uncle and aunt whereas on the other hand Fonte was raised by his paternal uncle and aunt. Having enough of their naughtiness both of their families decided to send them to Hati Sirs hostel. So both of them came to the hostel and ended up having the same room. With this their war began. Both wanted to prove their supremacy over the other. Where on one hand Nonte wanted to subdue Fonte, Fonte devised plans to defeat Nonte. While doing this they ended up catching a thief- Kagra One day Hati Sirs nephew called him up to inform him about a tiger which was spotted near her house in Sunderban. Hearing this Hati Sir dropped down to Sunderban to hunt down the tiger and he brought Nonte-Fonte with him. During the course of their adventure they went to visit a Temple. There, falling in the claws of a Kapalika they made a hasty escape and in their attempt to escape they got on a bus which was unluckily hijacked by a criminal Duo who used to forget everything. This amnestic disease caused them to fall in Dragons claws along with the entire bus and its passengers. Dragons happiness knew no bounds. There were so many people in the bus and if he could manage to turn all of them into criminals then it would be a big time success for him. With that he started their training to become good criminals. But this would turn out to be highly dangerous because if everyone does become thieves and dacoits then the whole country would be in dire straits. This had to be somehow stopped . The passengers had to be freed from dragons jaws. Nonte-Fonte took it upon themselves to fulfil this mammoth task. With their quick thinking and wise actions they somehow managed to fool the gang members and escaped from their captivity. They went directly to police and asked for their help.

== Cast ==
- Paran Bandopadhyay
- Subhasish Mukherjee
- Biswajit Chakraborty
- Amlan Majumder
- Sumit Samaddar
- Parthasarathi Dev
- Soham Bose Roy Chowdhury
- Soham Bose
- Krishna Banerjee
- Manojyoti Mukherjee
- Nimai Ghosh
