= Shibpur (film) =

2023 Indian Bengali language film

- Directed by: Arindam Bhattacharjee
- Produced by: Ajanta Sinha Roy
- Starring: Parambrata Chatterjee; Swastika Mukherjee; Mamata Shankar; Kharaj Mukherjee; Susmita Chatterjee; Rajatava Dutta
- Cinematography: Prosenjit Choudhary
- Edited by: Sujay Dutta Ray
- Music by: Amit Chatterjee
- Production company: Indo Americana Production
- Release date: 30 June 2023
- Running time: 132 minutes
- Country: India
- Language: Bengali

Shibpur is a 2023 Indian Bengali-language political thriller drama film directed by Arindam Bhattacharjee and produced by Ajanta Sinha Roy under the banner of Indo American Production. The film stars Parambrata Chatterjee, Swastika Mukherjee, Mamata Shankar and Kharaj Mukherjee in lead roles.

== Plot ==
A political journalist associated with a leading news channel found an interesting story in a woman who rose from an ordinary housewife to a notorious lady mafia gang leader in the 80s Shibpur, but who went missing in late 90s and was never found. Sultan Ahmed was appointed by the then CM as the SP of Howrah district to bring the law and order situation under control. Shibpur was mainly dominated by mafia groups of Nepal Bhattacharya and Tapan Barik. Nepal's main rival was Tapan Barik who controlled the whole fish market supply of the District. In the middle of all these, a new face appeared in Shibpur. A Woman named Mandira Biswas who lost her husband in a gangwar and when she did not find justice due to police and goons tie up, she took up arms in her hand and killed the accused in her own hand out of rage. She was backed by Tapan Barik since Tapan realized her potential and used her against his rival Nepal Bhattacharya. But soon it appears that Mandira was more intelligent than Tapan thought. She started eliminating Nepal and Tapan's men only to make them weaker. SP Sultan Ahmed found a golden opportunity and backed Mandira to eliminate the other gang leaders. The game plan worked well until Manidra's family was attacked one night and the result was disastrous. Mandira is now determined to take her last revenge.

== Cast ==
- Parambrata Chatterjee as Sultan Ahmed
- Swastika Mukherjee as Mandira Biswas
- Kharaj Mukherjee as Tapan Barik
- Rajatava Dutta as Nepal Bhattacharya
- Mamata Shankar
- Susmita Chatterjee
- Sujan Neel Mukhopadhyay
- Dyutiman Bhattacharya
- Sumit Samaddar
- Saumen Ghosh as Lakhai
- Rajdeep Sarkarv as Kana

== Music ==
Shibpur

Soundtrack album by Amit Chatterjee
- Released: 1 July 2023
- Recorded: 2022–2023
- Genre: Feature film soundtrack
- Length: 14:02
- Label: SVF Music

Official audio
- Shibpur - Full Album on YouTube

The music of the film has been composed by Amit Chatterjee.

No.	Title	Lyrics	Singer(s)	Length
1.	"Tara Jwele"	Ritam Sen	Lagnajita Chakraborty	2:50
2.	"Jotobaar Aalo"	Rabindranath Tagore	Iman Chakraborty	4:34
3.	"Prantore Prantore"	Ritam Sen	Kinjal Chattopadhyay, Supreet N Sarkar	2:34
4.	"Shibpur Gatha"	Ritam Sen	Snigdhajit Bhowmik	4:04
Total length:				14:02
