= Aaro Ek Prithibi =

- Theatrical release poster
- Directed by: Atanu Ghosh
- Screenplay by: Atanu Ghosh
- Produced by: Ashok Dhanuka; Himanshu Dhanuka
- Starring: Tasnia Farin; Kaushik Ganguly; Anindita Bose; Saheb Bhattacharya
- Cinematography: Appu Prabhakar
- Edited by: Sujay Datta Ray
- Music by: Debojyoti Mishra
- Production company: BS Films Ltd. Productions
- Distributed by: Eskay Movies
- Release date: 3 February 2023
- Running time: 122 mins
- Country: India
- Language: Bengali

Aaro Ek Prithibi is a 2023 Indian Bengali language drama film directed by Atanu Ghosh. and produced by BS Films Ltd. Productions under the banner of Eskay Movies. The film stars an ensemble of Tasnia Farin, Kaushik Ganguly, Anindita Bose and Saheb Bhattacharya.

Tasnia Farin won the 7th Filmfare Awards Bangla in Best Debut Actress category for her role in the film.

== Plot ==
Pratiksha, 27, arrives in London three months after her arranged marriage to Aritro Chatterjee, a Computer Engineer living in the UK. Pratiksha waits at the airport for a long time. However, her husband Aritro does not come to receive her. Pratiksha repeatedly tries to reach him on his mobile phone, but the number is unavailable. He cannot be found at his residence either. Aritro is lost, traceless, and Pratiksha moves around London frantically searching for him. She meets Ayesha, a divorced 32-yearold woman originally from Benaras, pursuing a rather dubious livelihood and 56-yearold Srikanta Munshi, a bohemian wanderer and street violinist, who claims to have some clue regarding Aritro's disappearance. Pratiksha has had quite an eventful life. Her parents separated when she was eleven. She lived in a suburb about 25 miles from Kolkata. Her father was a contract hoodlum for a businessman. He engaged in various antisocial activities and was often put behind bars until his employer bailed him out. This was her fathers vocation for years. A year later, her mother remarried. Pratiksha didn't like her stepfather. He was also indifferent to her, more so after having two sons of his own. Pratiksha felt ignored and neglected. Quite often, she left home and stayed with her father. When his father was on the run from the police, she had to return to her stepfathers home, disappointed. In London, Pratiksha is now entrapped in a vortex of lies, deceit and danger. She moves from one world to another. Her husbands disappearance takes a series of curious and intriguing twists and turns that ultimately pose a threat to her very life. Yet Pratikshas search for Aritro is actually driven by a need to own a home, something that has always eluded her. In fact, in this rootless era, the idea of home has become tarnished, elusive, and misty. So the question remains - Will Pratikshas quest ever.

== Cast ==
- Tasnia Farin as Pratiksha
- Kaushik Ganguly as Srikanta Munshi
- Anindita Bose as Ayesha
- Saheb Bhattacharya as Aritra Chatterjee

== Release ==
The film was released on 3 February 2023.
