= Kabuliwala (2023 film) =

2023 Indian Bengali film

- Theatrical Poster
- Directed by: Suman Ghosh
- Written by: Sreejib
- Screenplay by: Suman Ghosh, Sreejib
- Story by: Rabindranath Tagore
- Based on: Kabuliwala by Rabindranath Tagore
- Produced by: SVF; Jio Studios
- Starring: Mithun Chakraborty; Anumegha Kahali; Abir Chatterjee; Sohini Sarkar
- Cinematography: Subhankar Bhar
- Edited by: Sujay Datta Ray
- Music by: Indradeep Dasgupta
- Production companies: SVF; Jio Studios
- Distributed by: SVF
- Release date: 22 December 2023
- Running time: 106 minutes
- Country: India
- Language: Bengali
- Box office: ₹3 crore

Kabuliwala is a 2023 Indian Bengali-language period drama film directed by Suman Ghosh. Based on the 1892 short story "Kabuliwala" written by Rabindranath Tagore, the film stars Mithun Chakraborty, Anumegha Kahali, Abir Chatterjee and Sohini Sarkar in pivotal roles. It is produced by Shree Venkatesh Films and Jio Studios and the music is composed by Indraadip Dasgupta. It was released in theatres on 22 December 2023, on the occasion of Christmas.

== Plot ==
A middle-aged Afghan man, Rahmat, leaves behind his country, daughter and home to move to the bustling city of Kolkata in the year of 1965. He forms a great friendship with a little girl, Mini, and his heart overflows with fatherly love for her. The film captures the period that encapsulates the essence of heartwarming relationships and the deep significance of affection that knows no boundaries, transcending borders, religions and cultures.

== Cast ==
- Mithun Chakraborty as Rahmat Khan
- Anumegha Kahali as Mini
- Abir Chatterjee as Aurobindo Mukherjee, Mini's father
- Sohini Sarkar as Sneho, Mini's mother
- Gulshanara Khatun as Mokkoda, the maid-servant
- Sumit Samaddar as Bhola, the man-servant
- Kanchan Mullick as Potit De
- Sreeja Bhattacharyya as Elder Mini

== Production ==
=== Filming ===
Principal photography commenced on 1 August 2023 and filming was completed on 19 November 2023, with official confirmation from film director Suman Ghosh. The filming was done in Kolkata and Kargil.

=== Marketing ===
On 1 August 2023, the first look of the film was released with a 38 seconds video on SVF Youtube channel. the first poster was released on 14 November. The official trailer was released on 4 December 2023 on SVF and Jio Studios Youtube channels.

== Music ==
The music of the film and the background score is done by Indraadip Dasgupta. The lyrics are written by Srijato and Anirban Bhattacharya.

The first single "Khushi Ki Eid" was released on 14 December 2023. The second single "Bhaabo Jodi" was released on 29 December 2023.

Kabuliwala

Soundtrack album by Indraadip Dasgupta
- Released: 22 December 2023
- Recorded: 2023
- Genre: Feature film soundtrack
- Length: 17:03
- Language: Bengali
- Label: SVF Music
External audio
- Kabuliwala (Audio Jukebox) on YouTube

Track listing
No.	Title	Lyrics	Singer(s)	Length
1.	"Bhaabo Jodi"	Anirban Bhattacharya	Arijit Singh	4:28
2.	"Khushi Ki Eid"	Srijato	Javed Ali, Ishan Mitra	3:27
3.	"Kabul Manush"	Anirban Bhattacharya	Anirban Bhattacharya	5:30
4.	"Doriya Ei Jiboner E"	Srijato	Debayan Banerjee	3:37
Total length:				17:03

== Release ==
The film was released on 22 December 2023 on the occasion of Christmas weekend, clashing with Pradhan, Salaar: Part 1 - Ceasefire and Dunki at the box office.

== Reception ==
=== Critical response ===
A reviewer of OTT play wrote "It takes a lot of courage to choose a story that has strong sentimental stature in viewers’ hearts. Suman Ghosh takes up a brave challenge and comes out with flying colours. It is an out-and-out Mithun Chakraborty film and he fascinates the audience in every frame. Kabuliwala is a beautiful film that should never be missed". Poorna Banerjee from The Times of India says "The props and set design, especially inside Aurobindo’s house, are reminiscent of an older Calcutta that’s rapidly becoming extinct under a concrete jungle. The cinematography is done tastefully, and the costumes are period-appropriate. Though it has a predictable end, Kabuliwala is definitely a good watch for the entire family". Saibal Chatterjee from NDTV says "Kabuliwala is a Mithun Chakraborty show but, given a script that retains the spirit of Tagore's unwaveringly inclusivist worldview, there is much more to Suman Ghosh's film than what one actor, one performance and one story bring to it. And therein lies a firm riposte to any doubt that might arise about the film's relevance today". Subhasmita Kanji from Hindustan Times wrote "Several scenes are laugh-out-loud, like Mithun Anumegha's dance or their conversation; Many such scenes will make you cry. Again, some scenes seem to be right, that's how it should be". Sayani Ghatak from Anandabazar Patrika wrote "This Rabindra-writing written more than a hundred years ago will once again float with familiar emotions, move deep into the feelings, for that purpose 'Kabuliwala' has been made again in 2023. Thanks to the director, his intention did not fail". Sushmita Dey from Ei Samay says "Abir Chatterjee as Mini's father is eye-catching as always. Bengali-neat gentleman. On the other hand, Sohini Sarkar as the mother. As it happens and what else! Judgment of life in the boundaries of religion. Be very careful with the little mini. Short characters also have specialties".

=== Box office ===
The film grossed over ₹ 1 crore at the box office in the first 5 days.

== Accolades ==
Filmfare Awards Bangla

Year	Category	Work	Result	Name	Ref.
2024	Best Actor (Critics')	Kabuliwala	Won	Mithun Chakraborty	
