= Tasnia Farin =

Bangladeshi actress, model and singer

- তাসনিয়া ফারিণ
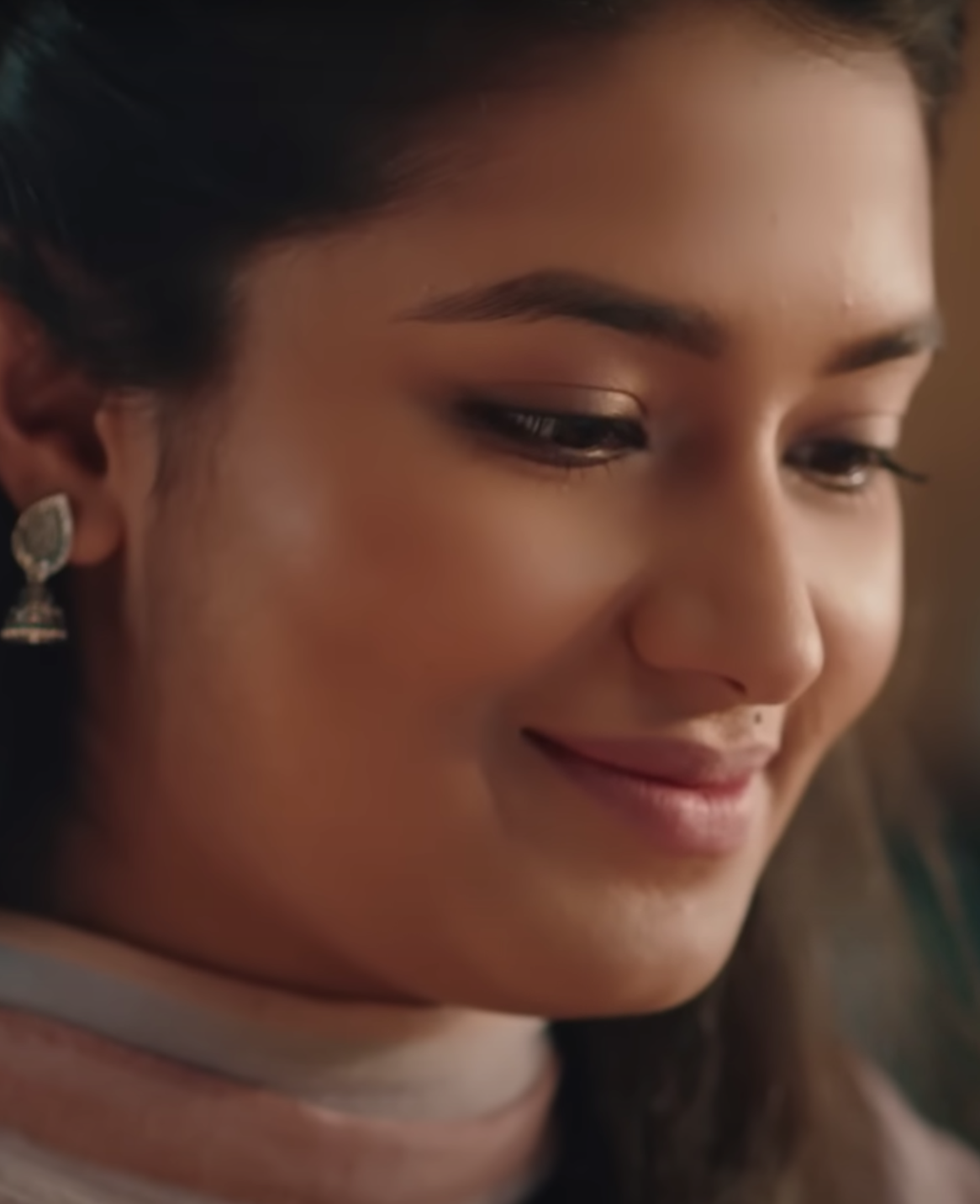
- Farin in 2023
- Born: Tasnia Zamil Farin; 30 January 1996 (age 30); Meherpur, Khulna, Bangladesh
- Education: Holy Cross Girls' High School; Holy Cross College, Dhaka; Bangladesh University of Professionals
- Occupations: Actress, model, singer
- Years active: 2017–present
- Spouse: Shaikh Rizwan (m. 2023)

Tasnia Zamil Farin (Bengali: তাসনিয়া জ়ামিল ফারিণ; [t̪asnia zamil faɾiɳ]; born 30 January 1996), known professionally as Tasnia Farin, is a Bangladeshi actress, model, and singer. She made her debut in silver screen with the Indian Bengali film Aaro Ek Prithibi (2023) and she won the 7th Filmfare Awards Bangla in Best Debut Actress category for her role in the film.

== Background ==
Farin has worked in the Indian Bengali film industry in West Bengal. She received critical acclaim for her role in Karagar and rose to fame with her lead role in the web series Ladies & Gentlemen, directed by Mostofa Sarwar Farooki. She is also known for her performance in the drama X Boyfriend and has appeared in several other dramas and music videos.

She played the role of Kotha in the web film Networker Baire, directed by Mizanur Rahman Aryan and produced by Redwan Rony, which was released on 19 August 2021. In 2022, Farin starred in the Indian Bengali-language film Aaro Ek Prithibi, directed by Kolkata-based filmmaker Atanu Ghosh.

In 2022, she won the Channel i Digital Media Award for Best Actress in a Web Series and Best Emerging Female Actor for her performance in Ladies & Gentlemen. In the same year, she won the Meril-Prothom Alo Critics Award for Best Actress in a Limited-Length Film for her performance in Tithir Osukh.

== Personal life ==
Tasnia Farin married Shaikh Rizwan on 11 August 2023. She aspired to be a singer since childhood and has released some of her own music, such as the song "Ronge Ronge Rongeen Hobo", which she performed on the magazine show Ityadi along with Tahsan Khan.

== Career ==
Farin made her television debut in 2017 with the drama Amra Abar Firbo Kobe. She began acting at her mother's encouragement. In 2018, she worked with Mashrafe Mortaza in an advertisement for BKash. The drama X Boyfriend increased her popularity when it aired on Valentine's Day in 2019. She has appeared in various Bangladeshi natoks. She also starred in ZEE5's web series Ladies & Gentlemen and Troll. As of 2019, she had acted in about eighty dramas.

== Dramas and telefilms ==
=== Drama series ===
Title	Category	Director
Syndicate	Web series	Shihab Shaheen
Ladies & Gentlemen	Web series	Mostofa Sarwar Farooki
Karagar	Web series	Syed Ahmed Shawki

=== Single dramas and telefilms ===
Title	Category	Director	Ref.
Kolonko	Drama	Preety Dutta	
Biral Tapassya	Drama	Ishtiyak Ahmad Zihad	
Tithir Oshukh	Drama	Imraul Rafat	
Revenge	Drama	Ziaul Hoque Polash	
Cholona Harai	Drama	Mizanur Rahman Aryan	
Maayer Daak	Drama	Mabrur Rashid Bannah	
Kushole Theko	Drama	Irfan Sajjad	
Apon	Drama	Kajal Arefin Ome	
Made for Each Other	Drama	Mabrur Rashid Bannah	
Troll	Drama	Sanjay Somadder	
Prem Ekattor	Drama	Shakal Ahmed	
Love Not Revenge	Drama	Mizanur Rahman Aryan	
Valobasa Tarpor	Drama	Raifat Adnan Papon	
Mone Mone	Drama	Chayanika Chowdhury	
Je Shohore Taka Ore	Drama	Sanjay Somadder	
Boyfriend	Drama	Kajal Arefin Ome	
Kangkhito Prohor	Drama	Mizanur Rahman Aryan	
Devdas Juliet	Drama	Jakaria Showkhin	
Bhalobasa Mitthe	Drama	Fahrian Chowdhury Tonmoy	
Ajj Nijhumer Biye	Drama	Biplob Yousuf	
Trophy	Drama	Vicky Zahed	
Say Sorry	Drama	Rushow Ahmed	
Cheletir Maa Chilona	Drama	Rintu Parvez	
Golpota Amar	Drama	Imraul Rafat	
Net Love	Drama	Rintu Parvez	
Roudrer Opekkha	Drama	Mosharraf Karim	
Bachelor Trip	Drama	Kajal Arefin Ome	
Rock Two	Drama	Mosharraf Karim	
Pocketmar	Drama	Swaraj Deb	
Sorry Sir	Drama	Kajal Arefin Ome	
X Boyfriend	Drama	Kajal Arefin Ome	
300 Takar Prem 100 Taka	Drama	Tawsif Mahbub	
21 Bochor Pore	Drama	Ziauddin Alam	

== Filmography ==
=== Films ===
Key
†	Denotes films that have not yet been released

Year	Title	Role	Notes	Ref.
2023	Aaro Ek Prithibi	Pratiksha	Debut film; Indian Bengali film	
2024	Fatima	Fatima		
2025	Insaaf	ASP Jahan		
2026	Prince: Once Upon a Time in Dhaka	Dilruba		

=== Web films ===
Year	Title	Role	Director	Notes	Ref.
2020	Shohor Chere Poranpur	Nitu	Mizanur Rahman Aryan	Web film	
2021	Networker Baire	Kotha	Mizanur Rahman Aryan	Chorki web film	
2022	Nishwas	Nipa	Raihan Rafi	Chorki web film	
2023	Punormilone	Trina	Mizanur Rahman Aryan	Chorki web film	
2023	Baba Someone's Following Me	Bijoya	Shihab Shaheen	Web film on Binge	
2024	Oshomoy	Urbi	Kajal Arefin Ome	Web film	

== Music videos ==
No.	Title	Lyrics	Music	Singer(s)	Length	Ref.
1	"Chol Bondhu Chol"	Shomeshwar Oli	Sajid Sarkar	Ibrahim Kamrul Shafin	4:34	
2	"Rupkothar Jogote"	Shomeshwar Oli	Sajid Sarkar	Abanti Sithi & Rehaan Rasul	5:12	
3	"Pother Gaan"	Khayam Sanu Sandhi	Khayam Sanu Sandhi	Khayam Sanu Sandhi	1:52	
4	"Bangla Amar Ma"	TBA	TBA	TBA	TBA	

== Awards and nominations ==
Year	Award	Category	Work	Result	Ref.
2021	Blender's Choice–The Daily Star Awards	Best Female Actor (popular category)	Ladies & Gentlemen	Won	
2022	Channel i Digital Media Awards	Best Actress (Web Series)	Ladies & Gentlemen	Won	
2022	Channel i Digital Media Awards	Best Rising Star (Female)	Ladies & Gentlemen	Won	
2022	Meril-Prothom Alo Critics Award	Best Actress in a Limited-Length Film	Tithir Osukh	Won	
2022	Dhallywood Music Award	New Sensation	—	Won	
2024	BFDA Awards	Best OTT Actress	Baba Someone's Following Me	Won	
2024	Filmfare Awards Bangla	Best Debut (Female)	Aaro Ek Prithibi	Won	
2024	Fajr International Film Festival Crystal Simorgh Award	Eastern Vista	Fatima	Won	
2026	Meril-Prothom Alo Awards	Best Film Actress	Prince: Once Upon a Time in Dhaka	Nominated	
