= Ghasjomi =

- Directed by: Sumantra Roy
- Screenplay by: Sumantra Roy
- Produced by: Priyanka More
- Starring: Sanjita; Suvosmita Mukherjee; Sawon Chakraborty; Debashish Chatterjee; Aarshi Roy
- Cinematography: Rana Pratap Karforma
- Edited by: Sumantra Roy
- Music by: Santajit Chatterjee
- Production company: Mosaic in Films
- Release date: 2 June 2023
- Country: India
- Language: Bengali

Ghasjomi (transl. Grassland) is a 2023 Indian Bengali language film directed by Sumantra Roy. The film addresses a range of previously untouched social taboos, shedding light on issues that have long been brushed under the rug.

== Synopsis ==
The film follows the story of Barna, a 24-year-old girl who is conducting research in social anthropology. During her research, she meets Ipsita, who has a very different personality from her. The film explores the relationship between the two women and the impact they have on each other.

== Cast ==
- Sanjita as Ipsita
- Suvosmita Mukherjee as Barna
- Sawon Chakraborty as Joy
- Debashish Chatterjee as Sushovan
- Aarshi Roy as Girl Next Door

== Reception ==
Ghasjomi has set a record by winning more than 100 awards in various categories.
