= Mitthye Premer Gaan =

- Directed by: Paroma Neotia
- Written by: Paroma Neotia; Kaun Bhatia; Aritra Sengupta
- Screenplay by: Aritra Sengupta; Kaun Bhatia; Dev Pranjal
- Story by: Paroma Neotia; Kaun Bhatia; Aritra Sengupta
- Produced by: Paroma Neotia
- Starring: Anirban Bhattacharya; Ishaa Saha; Arjun Chakrabarty
- Cinematography: Soumik Haldar ISC
- Edited by: Subho Pramanik
- Music by: Kuntal De; Ranajoy Bhattacharjee; Soumya Rit
- Production company: Neostories Productions
- Distributed by: Shree Venkatesh Films
- Release date: 10 February 2023
- Running time: 148 minutes
- Country: India
- Language: Bengali

Mitthye Premer Gaan is a 2023 Indian Bengali language musical romantic drama film co written, produced and directed by Paroma Neotia. The film stars Anirban Bhattacharya, Ishaa Saha and Arjun Chakrabarty in lead roles.

== Plot ==
Avik, an introverted loner in his 20s, is a small-time singer at a quaint bar in Kharagpur. Avik comes from a humble middle-class background and his mother teaches at a local blind school. Avik is perpetually conflicted between his dreams of pursuing music seriously and his imposter syndrome and low-self esteem. The fact that he hails from a dysfunctional family and his alcoholic father deserted them when he was young, has also left a deep-seated scar that makes him distrustful of people and ambitions, in general. Avik secretly writes his own songs and poetry but is too scared to sing it in public because he fears being ridiculed for it. He shares a love-hate rollercoaster relationship with his caring but stern mother and his only friend in the whole wide world is Deb, the bar's bartender cum manager. Anwesha is a young, boisterous, feisty, practical and extremely witty loudmouth who wears her heart on her sleeve. Anwesha soon realizes that there's more to Avik than meets the eye and connects with him on a deeper level. She is the first person who appreciates and accepts Avik for who he is, because somewhere deep down inside, she finds a reflection of herself in him. They form an unlikely friendship and Anwesha soon finds out that Avik despite being completely untrained, has a natural flair for writing and composing powerful songs. Aditya- another rising young Indian classical musician, who is incidentally Haripada's favourite disciples and one of Anwesha's closest friends. However, Anwesha goes out of his way to make sure that Avik gets the chances he deserves and convinces him to take training under her father.

== Cast ==
- Anirban Bhattacharya as Aveek Sanyal
- Ishaa Saha as Anwesha Ray
- Arjun Chakrabarty as Aditya Sen
- Soumya Mukherjee
- Anusha Viswanathan
- Sudipa Bose as Aveek's Mother
- Debesh Chattopadhyay as Pundit Haripada Ray
- Biswarup Biswas
- Sampritee Ghatak

== Soundtrack ==
Mitthye Premer Gaan

Soundtrack album by Kuntal De, Ranajoy Bhattacharjee and Soumya Rit
- Released: 20 February 2024
- Recorded: 2022
- Genre: Feature film soundtrack
- Length: 41:08
- Language: Bengali
- Label: SVF Music

Official audio
- Mitthye Premer Gaan on YouTube

The music of the film has been composed by Kuntal De, Ranajoy Bhattacharjee and Soumya Rit. The lyrics have been written by Aritra Sengupta.

Track listing
No.	Title	Music	Singer(s)	Length
1.	"Nirobotay Chhilo"	Ranajoy Bhattacharjee	Ishan Mitra, Ranajoy Bhattacharjee	2:52
2.	"Ekbar Takao Phire"	Kuntal De	Ishan Mitra	3:33
3.	"Mitthye Premer Gaan (Title Track)"	Kuntal De	Ishan Mitra	3:36
4.	"Jaaney Hridoy"	Kuntal De	Ishan Mitra	3:04
5.	"Ochena Karor Buke"	Ranajoy Bhattacharjee	Ishan Mitra, Ranajoy Bhattacharjee, Mekhla Dasgupta	3:52
6.	"Phirey Petey Chaai"	Soumya Rit	Ishan Mitra	3:23
7.	"Tomakey Khujey Paai"	Soumya Rit	Ishan Mitra	3:40
8.	"Tumi Chiley Na Amar"	Soumya Rit	Ishan Mitra	3:38
9.	"Mon Ei Desh E Te Thaknna"	Soumya Rit	Ishan Mitra, Madhubanti Bagchi	3:11
10.	"Guru Dohai Tomar"	Arkadeep Mishra	Ishan Mitra, Arkadeep Mishra	2:48
11.	"Tode Bin Sakhi"	Ranajoy Bhattacharjee	Ranajoy Bhattacharjee, Ambarish Das	4:15
12.	"Jaaney Hridoy Reprise"	Kuntal De	Anirban Bhattacharya	3:16
Total length:				41:08
