= Ardhangini (2023 film) =

Indian drama film

- Theatrical release poster
- Directed by: Kaushik Ganguly
- Written by: Kaushik Ganguly
- Produced by: Nispal Singh
- Starring: Churni Ganguly; Jaya Ahsan
- Cinematography: Gopi Bhagat
- Edited by: Subhajit Singha
- Music by: Songs: Anupam Roy; Score: Amit Chatterjee
- Production company: Surinder Films
- Distributed by: Surinder Films
- Release date: 2 June 2023
- Running time: 135 mins
- Country: India
- Language: Bengali

Ardhangini (lit. 'Better Half') is a 2023 Indian Bengali drama film written and directed by Kaushik Ganguly. The film is produced by Nispal Singh under the banner of Surinder Films. The film stars Churni Ganguly, Jaya Ahsan and Kaushik Sen in lead roles. It was a box office success. It was featured at the 54th IFFI Indian panorama section.

== Synopsis ==
After Suman suffers an accident, his wife Meghna and his ex-wife Subhra are compelled to meet each other. The story revolves around the awkward emotional duel between the two wives - past and present, in a time of personal crisis.

== Cast ==
- Kaushik Sen as Suman Chatterjee
- Churni Ganguly as Shubhra, Suman's ex-wife
- Jaya Ahsan as Meghna Mustafi, Suman's wife
- Lily Chakravarty as Parul Chatterjee, Suman's mother
- Ambarish Bhattacharya as Sukanto "Chhoto" Chatterjee, Suman's brother
- Daminee Benny Basu as Bihu
- Joydeep Mukherjee as doctor

== Release ==
The trailer of the film was unveiled on 12 May 2023. The film was released theatrically on 2 June 2023.

== Awards ==
Year	Award	Category	Name	Result
2024	7th Filmfare Awards Bangla	Best Film	Ardhangini	Won
2024	7th Filmfare Awards Bangla	Best Actress	Churni Ganguly	Won
2024	7th Filmfare Awards Bangla	Best Supporting Actor	Ambarish Bhattacharya	Won
2024	7th Filmfare Awards Bangla	Best Supporting Actress	Jaya Ahsan	Won

== Soundtrack ==
The songs are composed by Anupam Roy. The lyrics are penned by Anupam Roy. The background score is composed by Amit Chatterjee.

No.	Title	Singer(s)	Length
1.	"Alada Alada"	Iman Chakraborty	3:23
2.	"Sorir Bhalo Nei"	Anupam Roy	3:36
Total length:			6:59

== Sequel ==
A sequel, titled Aajo Ardhangini, was released on 10 May 2026.
