= Love Marriage (2023 film) =

2023 Indian Bengali language Romantic comedy drama film

- Directed by: Premendu Bikash Chaki
- Written by: Padmanabha Dasgupta
- Produced by: Nispal Singh; Surinder Singh
- Starring: Ranjit Mallick; Ankush Hazra; Oindrila Sen; Aparajita Adhya
- Cinematography: Soumyadipta Guin
- Edited by: MD Kalam
- Music by: Savvy
- Production company: Surinder films
- Release date: 14 February 2023
- Running time: 127 minutes
- Country: India
- Language: Bengali

Love Marriage is a 2023 Indian Bengali language romantic comedy drama film directed by Premendu Bikash Chaki. The film was produced by Surinder films. The film stars Ranjit Mallick, Ankush Hazra, Oindrila Sen and Aparajita Adhya.

== Cast ==
- Ranjit Mallick as Mahim Sanyal
- Ankush Hazra as Dipanjan Sanyal/Dipu/Bokai, Mahim's son
- Oindrila Sen as Sawon, Dipu's fiancée
- Sohag Sen as Mahim's mother, Dipu's grandmother
- Aparajita Adhya as Juthika, Sawon's mother
- Debnath Chatterjee as Bhabanath, Mahim's brother-in-law, Dipu's maternal uncle

== Reception ==
The film was reviewed by The Times of India, Ei Samay, and Sangbad Pratidin.
