= Maayakumari =

2023 Indian Bengali-language film

- Theatrical release poster
- Directed by: Arindam Sil
- Starring: Rituparna Sengupta; Abir Chatterjee; Arunima Ghosh; Indrasish Roy; Sauraseni Maitra; Rajatava Dutta
- Cinematography: Shubhankar Bhar
- Edited by: Sanglap Bhowmik
- Music by: Bickram Ghosh
- Production company: Camellia Productions
- Release date: 13 January 2023
- Running time: 149 minutes
- Country: India
- Language: Bengali

Maayakumari is a 2023 Indian Bengali language mystery drama film directed by Arindam Sil. It stars Rituparna Sengupta, Sauraseni Maitra, Ambarish Bhattacharya, Abir Chatterjee and Rajatabha Dutta. The music was composed by Bickram Ghosh. It was theatrically released on 13 January 2023.

== Synopsis ==
Set in the 1940s, the film is about the sudden disappearance of Maaya Kumari.

== Cast ==
- Abir Chatterjee as Kanan Kumar and Ahir Chatterjee
- Arunima Ghosh as Aruna alias Runi
- Rituparna Sengupta as Maayakumari
- Sauraseni Maitra as Nandini
- Ambarish Bhattacharya
- Rajatava Dutta as Sheetal Bhattacharya
- Ashim Roy Chowdhury
- Falaque Rashid Roy
- Joydeep Kundu
- Indrasish Roy
- Arna Mukhopadhay

== Production ==
On 19 November 2019, On the occasion of 100 years completion of Bengali cinema, director Arindam Sil officially announced the film by sharing the title poster "Maayakumari" through social media. Rituparna Sengupta's first collaboration with Arindam Sil.

On 21 December 2019, principal photography took place in Kolkata, West Bengal Filming was wrapped up on 20 January 2020

== Soundtrack ==
Maayakumari

Soundtrack album by Bickram Ghosh
- Released: 2020
- Recorded: 2020
- Genre: Feature film soundtrack
- Length: 32:29
- Language: Bengali

Official audio
- Maayakumari – Full Album on YouTube

The music was omposed by Bickram Ghosh with lyrics by Subhendu Dasmunshi, and sung by Madhubanti Bagchi. The first single titled "Madhumashey Phool Photey" was released on 11 May 2020; the second song, titled "Bhalobese Eto Jwala Jodi", was released on 7 October 2020.

Track listing
| No. | Title | Singer(s) | Length |
|---|---|---|---|
| 1. | "Ami ke" | Ujjaini Mukherjee | 2:56 |
| 2. | "Ami Ke" | Haimant Shukla | 2:32 |
| 3. | "Chilekotha" | Ujjaini Mukherjee, Shovon Ganguly | 3:50 |
| 4. | "Chokher Jole" | Manomay Bhattacharya | 3:03 |
| 5. | "Journey Song" | Ujjaini Mukherjee, Dibyendu Mukherjee | 2:46 |
| 6. | "Loke Jodi" | Ankita Bhattacharya | 2:33 |
| 7. | "Madhu Mashe" | Madhubanti Bagchi | 3:49 |
| 8. | "Phule Jodi" | Iman Chakraborty | 3:55 |
| 9. | "Rat Jaga Ghum" | Indrani Sen | 2:39 |
| 10. | "Sarata Din Por" | Manomay Bhattacharya | 3:24 |
| 11. | "Bhalobheshe eto jala" | Iman Chakraborty | 3:02 |
| Total length: | | | 32:29 |

== Reception ==
Agnivo Niyogi of The Telegraph Wrote "At its core, Maayakumari is a love story that ends in heartbreak. Maaya's affair with Kanan finds a resonance in Ahir's relationship with Runi". Poorna Banerjee of The Times of India gave the film a rating of 3/5 and says "But the script could have been far tighter, especially around the character of Runi, who is probably the weakest link in the tale. This is perhaps why despite the ensemble cast, the film fails to retain the attention of the audience in certain areas, making it a one-time watch at best". Shamayita Chakraborty of Ott Play gave the film a rating of 3/5 and wrote "Maayakumari has its limitations. Despite that, it is a nice film to watch. It has its cinematic moments to entertain and keep you hooked to the screen. Also, Maayakumari is a film that is best enjoyed on the big screen". A reviewer of Sangbad Pratidin wrote "The overall performance of Rituparna, Abir, Arunima, Indrashis, Souraseni, Arn, Ambarish was better. Everyone is careful to act keeping their time and environment in mind. Abir, Arunima and Rituparna were understandably uncomfortable with the prosthetic makeup, but it comes down to the excellence of the acting".
