= Shesh Pata =

- Theatrical release poster
- Directed by: Atanu Ghosh
- Written by: Atanu Ghosh
- Produced by: Firdausul Hasan; Probal Halder
- Starring: Prosenjit Chatterjee; Gargi Roychowdhury; Vikram Chatterjee; Rayati Bhattacharya
- Cinematography: Soumik Haldar
- Edited by: Sujay Datta Roy
- Music by: Debojyoti Mishra
- Production company: Friends Communication
- Release date: 14 April 2023
- Running time: 128 mins
- Country: India
- Language: Bengali

Shesh Pata is a 2023 Indian Bengali language film written and directed by Atanu Ghosh. The film is produced by Firdausul Hasan and Probal Halder under the banner of Friends Communication. The film stars Prosenjit Chatterjee, Gargi Roychowdhury, Vikram Chatterjee and Rayati Bhattacharya in lead roles.

== Synopsis ==
Formerly a well-known writer, Balmiki Sengupta, now lives in obscurity. A publishing house offers him ₹40,000 to write about his murdered wife and former actress Roshni Basu but he doesn't write it. To recover the writing, the publishing house engages Sounak Hazra, a young debt recovery agent.

== Cast ==
- Prosenjit Chatterjee as Balmiki Sengupta
- Gargi Roychowdhury as Medha Roy
- Vikram Chatterjee as Sounak Hazra
- Rayati Bhattacharya as Deepa

== Release ==
The official trailer of the film was released on 14 March 2023. The film released theatrically on 14 April 2023 coinciding Poila Baisakh.

The music of the film was composed primarily by Debojyoti Mishra.
