= Mayar Jonjal =

2023 Bangladeshi-Indian joint venture film

- Movie poster
- Directed by: Indranil Roychowdhury
- Written by: Indranil Roychowdhury; Sugata Sinha
- Based on: Two stories Bishakto Prem and Subala by Manik Bandopadhyay
- Produced by: Josim Uddin Ahmed; Indranil Roychowdhury
- Cinematography: Indranil Mukherjee
- Edited by: Sumit Ghosh
- Music by: Prabuddha Banarjee
- Production companies: Views and Visions; Flipbook
- Release dates: 24 February 2023 (Bangladesh and India)
- Running time: 101 minutes
- Countries: Bangladesh; India
- Language: Bengali

Mayar Jonjal (Bengali: মায়ার জঞ্জাল), (English: Debris of Desire) is a 2023 Bangladeshi-Indian joint venture film directed by Indranil Roychowdhury. The film is based on two stories Bishakto Prem and Subala of Manik Bandopadhyay. The film was released simultaneously on 24 February 2023 in Bangladesh and India. The film was jointly released in Bangladesh and Kolkata.

== Plot ==
A crook is smitten with a prostitute and attempts to leave with her money. But the criminal's plans take an unintended route when he encounters a recently dismissed factory worker who wishes to stop his wife from working as a housemaid.

The narrative runs on two parallel lines which meet at some point. The first chart covers Chandan Santra, a man who, after losing his job in a plastic factory, roams around as an ATM kiosk guard, suffers from alcohol addiction and hates his work as a brutal reminder of his manhood. His wife, Soma, hating her work as a housemaid in a fancy gated community in a big city, feels banged up, heavy, and worthless. The second chart gives an account of a smalltime don, Satya, who works for a real estate syndicate and gets it on with a prostitute Beauty, running away with her money while he is figuring out how to be real.

== Cast ==
- Ritwick Chakraborty as Chandan Santra (Chandu)
- Chandrayee Ghosh as Beauty
- Paran Bandopadhyay
- Shohel Mondal as Satya
- Aupee Karim as Soma
- Bratya Basu
- Saoli Chattopadhyay
- Wahida Mollick Jolly
- Mustafiz Shahin

== Production ==
=== Development ===
Director Indranil Roychowdhury was planning to make a short film based on Manik Bandopadhyay Bishakto Prem. Even after he had written the script, he felt like something was missing. So, at the behest of co-writer Sugata Sinha, he added the story Subala. Although those stories were set in the early '50s, he moved the story to the present day, Kolkata He has clarified that there is no similarity between the original stories and the film, except for the mental state of the characters and the stories were only a template for the world created in the film. Talking about the film's title, the director stated that it is primarily to do with the dissonance between the Bengali idea of Maya which is the life force that holds us to life, and Jonjal the refuse of life and how that which we love, we end up destroying.

=== Casting and filming ===
Mayar Jonjal marks the return of Bangladeshi actress Aupee Karim to the silver screen after a long time. Karim said the director had created such a clear picture of her character that the job was simple. Shohel Mondol was cast as Satya after being suggested to the director by Bangladeshi director Mejbaur Rahman Sumon. Considering his theatre background, he worked with the director on his character's mixed dialect, with the director providing him with voice recordings and images; he described learning from watching actor Ritwick Chakraborty in the film. Chakraborty said the film shows a Kolkata that viewers don't always get to see, while Chandrayee Ghosh called Indranil Roychowdhury an excellent director. The film was primarily filmed on location in and around Kolkata, with some scenes shot in Dhaka. The movie was co-produced by "Views and Visions," company of Bangladesh, and the "Flipbook," Kolkata, India. The film was premiered in many international film festivals.

== Music ==
The film score was composed by Prabuddha Banerjee who called it one of his most challenging projects. The film does not include any songs, and the task Banerjee faced was to produce a decent score with as little music as possible.

== Themes ==
The film has been praised for its neo-realist style and for the non-glamourised, unpolished picture of Kolkata it presents, which makes Kolkata stand in contrast with more slick portrayals of the city in most contemporary Bengali films. While some critics have argued that the film deals with working-class and marginalised people, and deals with issues such as poverty, unemployment, male ego and the inability of people to hold things together in a relationship, the structure of the film has been described as a collage of shots, with each person following his or her tracks that ultimately cross, join at a crossroads and then continue on separate routes. Anjan Dutt has called it a film that refuses the clichés of modern Bangla cinema and has complimented its cinematography, which captures the people in their space through mostly mid-shots and long-shots.

== Release ==
The trailer of Mayar Jonjal was termed as the mirror of a rickety society. The official poster of the film was also unveiled ahead of the official film release. The film had its world premiere screening at the 23rd Shanghai International Film Festival in 2020 and was nominated for the Asian New Talent Award at the festival. Later, it was officially announced for screening at the Moscow International Film Festival and at the Jogja-NETPAC Asian Film Festival 2020. Subsequently, the film was officially announced for screening at the Indian Film Festival of Los Angeles 2021 and L'Asian Film Festival Barcelona 2021. The film had its Bangladesh premiere at the Dhaka International Film Festival 2022 in January 2022.

The movie was released in theaters in Bangladesh and India on 24 February 2023. It was shown in several Bangladeshi cinemas in Dhaka, Chattogram, Narayanganj, Bogura, Sirajganj, Mymensingh, and Khulna. It was released for online streaming on Bangladesh's OTT platform Chorki on 24 September. The director talked about the story of the film and his approach in a video interview.

== Reception ==
The film was praised by the critics. Anjan Dutt of t2 praised the film for not falling into the trap of clichés of present day Bangla film industry and beautiful cinematography which captures the people in their surroundings with mostly mid-shots and long-shots. The Telegraph India review said, "A heart-breaking kaleidoscope of a city less shiny and an emotional sucker punch with sensitive writing." OTTplay called it as, "A must watch film that depicts the normal life of the working-class people with powerful performances". The Business Standard review praised it as, "A bold neo-realist effort that depicts the shadows of reality under the glittering glamor of fiction".

== Accolades ==
- Jury Award for Feature Film at the 21st Asiatica Film Festival (2020) in Italy.
- Best South Asian Feature Film at the Arthouse Asia Film Festival in Kolkata.
- Best Screenplay in the Asian Film Competition at the Dhaka International Film Festival (2022).
- Best Picture at the 23rd Rainbow Film Festival in London (2022).
- Received 7 Filmfare Awards Bangla in 2024, including Best Film (Critics' Choice), Best Screenplay, Best Cinematography, Best Editing, Best Sound Design, and Best Debut Male Actor.
