= Manobjomin =

- Theatrical release poster
- Directed by: Srijato
- Written by: Srijato
- Produced by: Rana Sarkar
- Starring: Parambrata Chatterjee; Priyanka Sarkar; Paran Bandopadhyay
- Cinematography: Supriyo Dutta
- Edited by: Anirban Maity
- Production company: Dag Creative Media
- Release date: 6 January 2023
- Country: India
- Language: Bengali

Manobjomin is a 2023 Indian Bengali language drama film directed by debutant director Srijato and produced by Rana Sarkar. The film Stars Parambrata Chatterjee and Priyanka Sarkar in lead roles. The film was released on 6 January 2023.

== Cast ==
- Parambrata Chatterjee as Sanket, bank employee and social worker, manobjomin
- Priyanka Sarkar as Kuhu, a social worker for the ngo, manobjomin
- Paran Bandopadhyay as barin chattopadhyay, a highly religious but wealthy businessman, a fan of chhabbi biswas
- Rupanjana Mitra as Ipsita
- Aniket Ghosh
- Srijit Mukherji as himself
- Kharaj Mukherjee
