= Bogla Mama Jug Jug Jiyo =

2023 Indian Bengali comedy film

- Directed by: Dhrubo Banerjee
- Written by: Sreejib
- Screenplay by: Sreejib
- Produced by: Jyoti Deshpande; Shrikant Mohta; Mahendra Soni
- Starring: Kharaj Mukherjee; Riddhi Sen; Rajatava Dutta; Aparajita Adhya; Ditipriya Roy
- Cinematography: Soumik Haldar
- Edited by: Sanglap Bhowmik
- Music by: Indraadip Dasgupta
- Production companies: Jio Studios; SVF
- Distributed by: SVF
- Release date: 24 November 2023
- Country: India
- Language: Bengali

Bogla Mama Jug Jug Jiyo is a 2023 Indian Bengali comedy film directed by Dhrubo Banerjee and produced by Shree Venkatesh Films and Jio Studios, based on Rajkumar Maitra's cartoon character, Bagalamama. The film stars Kharaj Mukherjee, Riddhi Sen, Rajatava Dutta, Aparajita Adhya and Ditipriya Roy in prominent roles. The film was released on 24 November 2023.

== Plot ==
Set in the backdrop of the late 1980s, Boglacharan Bhattacharya AKA, Bogla Mama is a funny, witty, middle-aged theatre fanatic who is loved by the entire town for his humour and antics. Bogla along with his gang of rugged young adults dive into hilarious adventures only to create further inconveniences. But in the end, Bogla Mama’s charm, never-say-die attitude and cleverness always save the day. Bogla is popular in the town for being a laugh riot, but things go haywire when he is commissioned by a local don to stage a play in a drama competition.

== Cast ==
- Kharaj Mukherjee as Bogla Mama
- Riddhi Sen as Kebu
- Rajatava Dutta as Felu Acharya
- Aparajita Adhya as Krishna
- Kaushik Sen as Mejo Kaka
- Ditipriya Roy as Madhuja
- Biswanath Basu as Choto Kaka
- Reshmi Sen as Sarama
- Ujan Chatterjee as Tridib
- Mithun Gupta as Naru
- Sudip Dhara as Shadan
- Partha Sarathi Deb as Boro Kaka
- Jeet Sundor as Dhonu

== Music ==
The music of the film is composed by Indraadip Dasgupta, while the lyrics are written by Rangan Chakraborty.

The first single "Bogla Mama Jug Jug Jio" was released on 28 October 2023. The second single "Droupodi Ene De" was released on 2 November 2023.

Bogla Mama Jug Jug Jiyo track listing
No.	Title	Lyrics	Singer(s)	Length
1.	"Bogla Mama Jug Jug Jio"	Rangan Chakraborty	Debayan Banerjee	3:01
2.	"Droupodi Ene De"	Rangan Chakraborty	Indraadip Dasgupta	2:29
