= 5th Filmfare Awards Bangla =

Indian film awards

- Date: 18 March 2022
- Site: Kolkata
- Hosted by: Abir Chatterjee; Sohini Sarkar; Anirban Bhattacharya
- Official website: Filmfare Awards Bangla 2020

Highlights
- Best Film: Borunbabur Bondhu and Tonic
- Best Critic: Binisutoy

Television coverage
- Network: Zee Bangla

The 5th Filmfare Awards Bangla ceremony, presented by The Times Group, honor the best Bengali language Indian films of 2020–2021. The nominations were announced on 14 March 2022. The ceremony was held on 17 March 2022 in Kolkata. Borunbabur Bondhu and Tonic shared the award for Best Film. The Award Show was aired on 24 and 30 April 2022 on Zee Bangla and Zee Bangla Cinema respectively. The show was hosted by Abir Chatterjee, Sohini Sarkar and Anirban Bhattacharya.

== Winners and nominees ==
Best Film		Best Director
Borunbabur Bondhu – Surinder Films; Tonic – Dev Entertainment Ventures; Dwitiyo Purush – Shree Venkatesh Films; Golondaaj – Shree Venkatesh Films; Hiralal – Easel Movies; Switzerland – Jeetz Filmworks & Grassroot Entertainment		Anik Dutta – Borunbabur Bondhu; Arun Roy – Hiralal; Avijit Sen – Tonic; Dhrubo Banerjee – Golondaaj; Srijit Mukherji – Dwitiyo Purush; Supriyo Sen – Tangra Blues
Best Actor		Best Actress
Paran Bandopadhyay – Tonic as Jaladhar Sen; Abir Chatterjee – Switzerland as Shibu Saha; Anirban Bhattacharya – Dwitiyo Purush as Khoka / Paltan; Dev – Golondaaj as Nagendra Prasad Sarbadhikary; Kinjal Nanda – Hiralal as Hiralal Sen; Parambrata Chatterjee – Tangra Blues as Sanjib Mondal		Jaya Ahsan – Binisutoy as Srabani Barua; Aparajita Auddy – Ekannoborti as Malini Chatterjee; Koel Mallick – Rawkto Rawhoshyo as RJ Swarnaja; Ritabhari – Brahma Janen Gopon Kommoti as Shabari Chakraborty; Rukmini Maitra – Switzerland as Rumi Mitra-Saha
Best Supporting Actor		Best Supporting Actress
Samiul Alam – Tangra Blues as Chalu; Kharaj Mukhopadhyay – Habu Chandra Raja Gobu Chandra Montri as Mantri Gobu Chondro; Paran Bandopadhyay – Borunbabur Bondhu as Sukumar; Partha Sarathi Deb – Tokhon Kuasa Chilo as; Riddhi Sen – Anusandhan as; Rwitobroto Mukherjee – Dwitiyo Purush as young Khoka; Saswata Chatterjee - Shororipu 2: Jotugriho as Debraj		Aparajita Auddy – Cheeni as Mishti; Alokananda Roy – Ekannoborti as Malini's mother; Basabdatta Chatterjee – Tokhon Kuasa Chilo as; Chandreyee Ghosh – Mukhosh as Kaberi Bose; Poulomi Basu – Dictionary as Sreemati Chatterjee; Tannishtha Biswas - Hiralal as Kusum Kumari Devi
Debut Awards
Best Male Debut	Best Female Debut	Best Debut Director
Kinjal Nanda – Hiralal as Hiralal Sen; Arna Mukhopadhyay - Dictionary as Suman; Soumya Mukherjee - Prem Tame as Pablo	Oindrila Sen – Magic as Kriti; Ananya Sen – Ekannoborti as Pinky Chatterjee; Anuska Chakraborty – Hiralal as Hemangini; Oishani Dey - Tangra Blues as Pori; Susmita Chatterjee - Prem Tame as Raji; Tannishtha Biswas - Hiralal as Kusum Kumari Devi	Avijit Sen – Tonic; Supriyo Sen – Tangra Blues; Aritra Mukherjee – Brahma Janen Gopon Kommoti; Ujjwal Basu – Doodhpither Gachh; Sauvik Kundu - Switzerland
Writing Awards
Best Story	Best Screenplay	Best Dialogue
Arjun Dutta – Abyakto; Arindam Bhattacharya – Antardhaan; Ayan Chakraborti – Shororipu 2: Jotugriho; Sauvik Kundu – Switzerland; Suvonkar Banerjee and Srijit Mukherjee - Dwitiyo Purush	Dhrubo Banerjee – Golondaaj; Srijit Mukherji – Dwitiyo Purush; Aniket Chaterjee – Habu Chandra Raja Gobu Chandra Montri; Arun Roy – Hiralal; Atanu Ghosh - Binisutoy; Kamaleshwar Mukherjee - Anusandhan; Saibal Mitra - Tokhon Kuasa Chilo; Subhrajit Mitra - Avijatrik	Anik Dutta and Utsav Mukherjee – Borunbabur Bondhu; Dhrobo Banerjee and Anirban Bhattacharya – Golondaaj; Samragnee Bandyopadhyay – Brahma Janen Gopon Kommoti; Sounava Bose – Hiralal; Subhrajit Mitra - Avijatrik; Shaket Banerjee and Sreejib - Mukhosh

== Critics' awards ==
=== Critics’ Award For Best Actor (Male) ===
- Anirban Bhattacharya (Dwitiyo Purush)
- Arjun Chakraborty (Avijatrik)

=== Critics’ Award For Best Actor (Female) ===
- Arpita Chatterjee (Abyakto)

=== Critics' Award For Best Film ===
- Atanu Ghosh (Binisutoy)

== Music Awards ==
=== Best Music Album ===
- Shantanu Moitra, Anupam Roy, Prasenjit Mukherjee, Shibabrata Biswas (Prem Tame)

=== Best Lyrics ===
- Nilanjan Chakraborty- Behaya (Ekannoborti)

=== Best Playback Singer (Male) ===
- Ishan Mitra - Mayar Kangal (Olpo Holeo Sotti)

=== Best Playback Singer (Female) ===
- Lagnajita Chakraborty - Behaya (Ekannoborti)

=== Best Background Score ===
- Bickram Ghosh (Avijatrik)

== Technical Awards ==
=== Best Sound Design ===
- Anindit Roy & Adeep Singh Manki (Tangra Blues)

=== Best Production Design ===
- Tapan Kumar Sheth (Hiralal)

=== Best Editing ===
- Sujay Datta Ray (Binisutoy)

=== Best Cinematography ===
- Supratim Bhol (Avijatrik)

== Lifetime Achievement Award ==
- Ranjit Mallick

== Other Awards ==
=== Best Costume ===
- Ruma Sengupta (Hiralal)

=== Best Choreography ===
- Baba Yadav - Mon Anmone (Magic)
