= Filmfare Award Bangla for Best Actor =

Indian award for Bengali language films

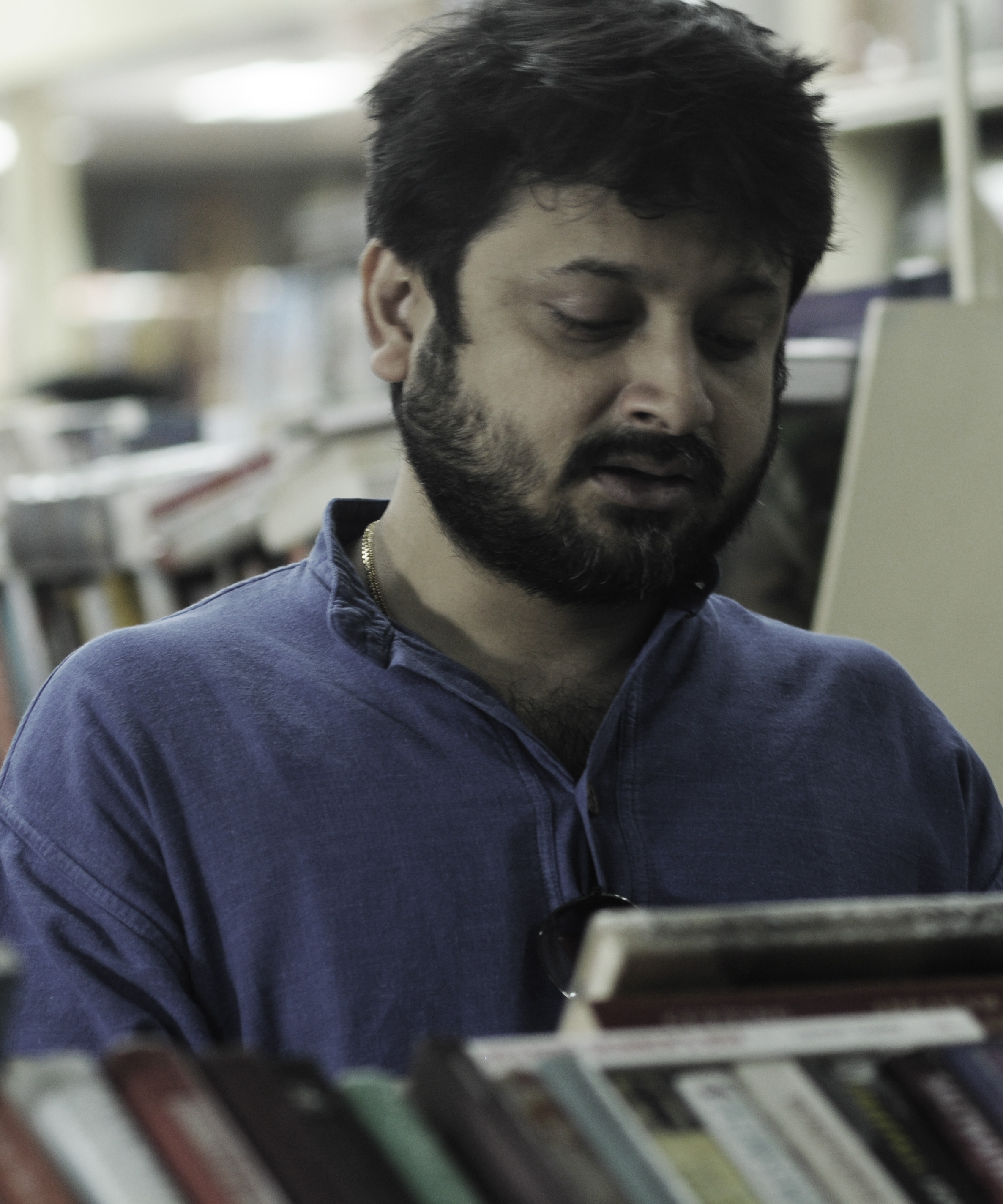
- The Current recipient: Shiboprosad Mukherjee
- Awarded for: Best Performance by an Actor in a Leading Role
- Country: India
- Presented by: Filmfare
- First award: Ritwick Chakraborty, Shobdo (2014)
- Currently held by: Shiboprosad Mukherjee, Bohurupi (2025)
- Website: Filmfare Awards Bangla

The Filmfare Award Bangla for Best Actor is an award in India, which is presented annually at the Filmfare Awards Bangla to an actor based on a jury decision; it is given by Filmfare for Bengali films.

== Superlatives ==
Superlative	Actor	Record	
Actors with most awards	Prosenjit Chatterjee	Soumitra Chatterjee	4
Actor with most nominations	Dev	8	
Actor with most consecutive win	Prosenjit Chatterjee (2017, 2018, 2021)	3	
Actor with most nominations without ever winning	Dev	8	
Oldest winner	Paran Bandopadhyay (2022)	81	
Oldest nominee	Paran Bandopadhyay (2022)	81	
Youngest winner	Ritwick Chakraborty (2014)	36	
Youngest nominee	Anirban Bhattacharya (2022)	35	

=== Most Wins ===
Winner	Number of wins	Years
Prosenjit Chatterjee; Soumitra Chatterjee	4	2017, 2018, 2021, 2024; 1975, 1977, 1979, 1983
Ritwick Chakraborty	1	2014
Paran Bandopadhyay	1	2022
Mithun Chakraborty	1	2023

=== Most Nominations ===
Singer	Number of Nominations	Number of wins
Dev	8	0
Prosenjit Chatterjee	5	3
Abir Chatterjee	4	0
Jisshu Sengupta	3	0
Paran Bandopadhyay	1	
Soumitra Chatterjee	2	0

== List of winners ==
Table key
‡	Indicates the winner
†	Indicates a posthumous winner

=== 2010s ===
Year	Photos of winners	Actor	Role(s)	Film
2014 (1st)		Ritwick Chakraborty ‡	Tarak Dutta	Shobdo
2014 (1st)		Dev	Shankar Ray Choudhuri	Chander Pahar
2014 (1st)		Jeet	Surya	Boss
2014 (1st)		Prosenjit Chatterjee	Kakababu / Raja Roychowdhury	Mishawr Rawhoshyo
2014 (1st)		Saswata Chatterjee	Nilkantha Bagchi	Meghe Dhakha Tara
2015	NO CEREMONY			
2016	NO CEREMONY			
2017 (2nd)		Prosenjit Chatterjee ‡	Muntasir Chowdhury Badal	Shankhachil
2017 (2nd)		Abir Chatterjee	Byomkesh Bakshi	Byomkesh Pawrbo
2017 (2nd)		Chiranjeet Chakraborty	Detective Chandrakanta	Shororipu
2017 (2nd)		Dev	Markaz Ali	Zulfiqar
2017 (2nd)		Jisshu Sengupta	Byomkesh Bakshi	Byomkesh O Chiriyakhana
2017 (2nd)		Paran Bandopadhyay	Pranabendu Das	Cinemawala
2018 (3rd)		Prosenjit Chatterjee ‡	Aryanil	Mayurakshi
2018 (3rd)		Dev	Shibaji "Shiba" Sanyal	Chaamp
2018 (3rd)		Jisshu Sengupta	Arnab Lahiri	Posto
2018 (3rd)		Ritwick Chakraborty	Pratyay	Bibaho Diaries
2018 (3rd)		Soumitra Chatterjee	Sushovan	Mayurakshi

=== 2020s ===
Year	Photos of winners	Actor	Role(s)	Film
2021 (4th)		Prosenjit Chatterjee ‡	Subhas Chandra Bose / Gumnami Baba	Gumnaami
2021 (4th)		Abir Chatterjee	Samiran Bose	Shah Jahan Regency
2021 (4th)		Dev	Chandan Chatterjee	Sanjhbati
2021 (4th)		Parambrata Chatterjee	Rudra Mukherjee	Shah Jahan Regency
2021 (4th)		Rudranil Ghosh	Vinci Da	Vinci Da
2021 (4th)		Shiboprosad Mukherjee	RJ Arjun Mallik	Konttho
2022 (5th)		Paran Bandopadhyay ‡	Jaladhar Sen	Tonic
2022 (5th)		Abir Chatterjee	Shibasish Saha	Switzerland
2022 (5th)		Anirban Bhattacharya	Khokaa / Paltan	Dwitiyo Purush
2022 (5th)		Dev	Nagendra Prasad Sarbadhikari	Golondaaj
2022 (5th)		Kinjal Nanda	Hiralal Sen	Hiralal
2022 (5th)		Parambrata Chatterjee	Sanjib Mondal	Tangra Blues
2023 (6th)		Mithun Chakraborty ‡	Gaur Chakraborty	Projapoti
2023 (6th)		Abir Chatterjee	Professor Subarna Sen / Sona Da	Karnasubarner Guptodhon
2023 (6th)		Dev	Kuntal Sarkar	Kacher Manush
2023 (6th)		Indraneil Sengupta	Feluda	Hatyapuri
2023 (6th)		Jisshu Sengupta	Soumitra Chatterjee	Abhijaan
2023 (6th)		Prosenjit Chatterjee	Himself (a doppleganger of Prosenjit Chatterjee) / Nirmal Mondal	Aay Khuku Aay
2023 (6th)		Soumitra Chatterjee (posthumous)	Himself	Abhijaan
2024 (7th)		Prosenjit Chatterjee ‡	Balmiki Sengupta	Shesh Pata
2024 (7th)		Anirban Chakrabarty	Ekenbabu	The Eken: Ruddhaswas Rajasthan
2024 (7th)		Dev	Bagha Jatin	Bagha Jatin
2024 (7th)		Dev	Deepak Pradhan	Pradhan
2024 (7th)		Jeet	Arjun Mukherjee / Victor	Manush
2024 (7th)		Mithun Chakraborty	Rehmat Khan	Kabuliwala
2024 (7th)		Parambrata Chatterjee	Sultan Ahmed	Shibpur
2025 (8th)		Shiboprosad Mukherjee ‡	Bikram Pramanik / Chuni Kumar / Bablu Sarkar / Eklas Chaudhury	Bohurupi
2025 (8th)		Ankush Hazra	Mirza Sheikh	Mirza: Part 1 - Joker
2025 (8th)		Dev	Shyam Mahato / Madhu	Khadaan
2025 (8th)		Mithun Chakraborty	Saradindu Bose	Shontaan
2025 (8th)		Prosenjit Chatterjee	Prosen Mitra	Ajogyo
2025 (8th)		Tota Roy Chowdhury	Kanishka Chatterjee	Chaalchitro: The Frame Fatale
2025 (8th)		Vikram Chatterjee	Lubdhok Chatterjee	Pariah
