= List of Indian Bengali films of 2021 =

This is a list of Bengali language films that released in 2021.

== January–March ==
Opening		Title	Director	Cast	Production company	Genre	Ref.
J A N U A R Y	1	Pratidwandi	Saptaswa Basu	Rudranil Ghosh, Saswata Chatterjee, Saurav Das	G7 Entertainment, Kashish Entertainment, Neo Studios	Action, Thriller	
J A N U A R Y	22	Tumi Ashbe Bole	Sujit Mondal	Bonny Sengupta, Koushani Mukherjee, Kaushik Banerjee, Palash Ganguly	Surinder Films	Romance	
F E B R U A R Y	12	Magic	Raja Chanda	Ankush Hazra, Oindrila Sen	Raja Chanda Films	Mystery, Thriller	
F E B R U A R Y	12	Prem Tame	Anindya Chatterjee	Susmita Chatterjee, Sweta Mishra, Soumya Mukherjee	Shree Venkatesh Films	Romance	
F E B R U A R Y	12	Dictionary	Bratya Basu	Abir Chatterjee, Nusrat Jahan, Mosharraf Karim	Friend's Communication	Drama	
F E B R U A R Y	19	Swapner Thikana	Somnath Sarkar	Soumitra Chatterjee, Siddhartha Dey, Sanjukta Ghosh, Shree Bhaumik	Ashadeep Pictures	Drama	
F E B R U A R Y	26	Miss Call	Ravi Kinagi	Soham Chakraborty, Rittika Sen, Supriyo Dutta, Reshmi Sen	Surinder Films	Romance	
M A R C H	5	Hiralal	Arun Roy	Saswata Chatterjee, Kharaj Mukherjee, Shankar Chakraborty, Kinjal Nanda	Easel	Biography, Drama	
M A R C H	5	The Joker	Joy Bhattacharya	Soumitra Chatterjee, Aman Reza, Mou Baidya and Sanjukta	Sunny Entertainment	Horror, Drama	
M A R C H	12	Sleelatahanir Pore	Reshmi Mitra	Soumitra Chatterjee, Rahul Banerjee, Abhishek Chatterjee, Moubani Sorcar	Sonam Movies	Drama	
M A R C H	19	Pappur Biye	Anthony Jane	Biswajit Chakraborty, Soma Chakraborty, Barun Chakraborty, Taabbu	Clapboard Entertainment	Comedy	
M A R C H	19	War: Journey To Win	Srijit	Shantilal Mukherjee, Mousumi Saha, Sudip Mukherjee, Pratik Saha	RJ Films & workshop	Action	
M A R C H	19	Chakrabyuh	Partha Sarthi Joardar	Rajesh Sharma, Veronica Mona Dutta, Arundhati Chakraborty, Saheb Bhattacharjee	MFS Productions	Drama	

== April–June ==
Opening		Title	Director	Cast	Production company	Genre	Ref.
A P R I L	2	Flyover	Abhimanyu Mukherjee	Koel Mullick, Gaurav Chakrabarty, Ravi Shaw, Shantilal Mukherjee, Koushik Roy, Poulomi Das	Surinder Films Pvt Ltd	Thriller	
A P R I L	9	Ei Ami Renu	Saumen Sur	Sohini Sarkar, Gaurav Chakrabarty, Soham Chakraborty	Aangsh Movies	Drama	
A P R I L	15	Tangra Blues	Supriya Sen	Parambrata Chatterjee, Madhumita Sarcar	Shree Venkatesh Films	Musical	

== July–September ==
Opening		Title	Director	Cast	Production company	Genre	Ref.
A U G	19	Mukhosh	Birsa Dasgupta	Anirban Bhattacharya, Chandrayee Ghosh, Payel De, Kaushik Sen	Shree Venkatesh Films	Psychological thriller	
A U G	20	Binisutoy	Atanu Ghosh	Jaya Ahsan, Ritwick Chakraborty	Friends Communication	Drama	
S E P T	10	Lockdown	Abhimanyu Mukherjee	Soham Chakraborty, Srabanti Chatterjee, Rajnandini Pal, Adrit Roy, Om Prakash Sahani, Manali Manisha Dey	Artage & Pandemonium Productions	Biography, Drama	
S E P T	17	Abalamban	Narugopal Mandal	Soumitra Chatterjee, Lily Chakraborty, Biswajit Chakraborty, Meghna Halder, Narugopal Mandal, Priya Paul	Priya Films & Entertainment	Family, Drama	
S E P T	24	Torulatar Bhoot	Deb Roy	Ishaa Saha, Basabdatta Chatterjee, Indraneil Sengupta	Green Motion Pictures	Horror Thriller	

== October–December ==
Opening		Title	Director	Cast	Production company	Genre	Ref.
O C T O B E R	10	Golondaaj	Dhrubo Banerjee	Dev, Alexx O'Nell, Anirban Bhattacharya , Ishaa Saha	SVF Entertainment	Period sports saga	
O C T O B E R	10	Habu Chandra Raja Gobu Chandra Montri	Aniket Chattopadhyay	Saswata Chatterjee, Kharaj Mukhopadhyay, Arpita Chatterjee	Dev Entertainment Ventures	Fairy tale, political satire	
O C T O B E R	10	Bony	Parambrata Chatterjee	Parambrata Chatterjee, Koel Mallick, Anjan Dutt, Kanchan Mullick	Surinder Films	Sci-fi thriller	
O C T O B E R	10	Shororipu 2: Jotugriho	Ayan Chakraborty	Chiranjeet Chakraborty , Saswata Chatterjee, Arunima Ghosh	Camellia Productions	Psychological crime-thriller	
O C T O B E R	10	FIR	Joydip Mukherjee	Ankush Hazra, Bonny Sengupta, Ritabhari Chakraborty	Roadshow Films, Shadow films	Crime thriller	
O C T O B E R	10	Baazi	Anshuman Pratyush	Jeet, Mimi Chakraborty	Jeetz Filmworks	Action thriller	
N O V E M B E R	12	Nirbhaya	Anshuman Pratyush	Gaurav Chakrabarty, Priyanka Sarkar		Courtroom drama	
N O V E M B E R	12	Olpo Holeo Sotti	Soumojit Adak	Saurav Das, Darshana Banik			
N O V E M B E R	19	Ekannoborti	Mainak Bhaumik	Aparajita Auddy	Shree Venkatesh Films	Drama	
N O V E M B E R	19	Kisholoy	Atiul Islam	Sudip Mukherjee, Debleena Dutta			
N O V E M B E R	19	72 Ghanta	Atanu Ghosh	Paran Bandopadhay, Ritwick Chakraborty			
D E C E M B E R	3	Avijatrik	Subhrajit Mitra	Arjun Chakrabarty, Sabyasachi Chakraborty, Arpita Chatterjee, Sreelekha Mitra, Barun Chanda, Biswanath Basu, Ayushman Mukherjee, Ditipriya Roy	Bhandarkar Entertainment, Gaurang Jalan	Period drama	
D E C E M B E R	3	Anusandhan	Kamaleswar Mukherjee	Saswata Chatterjee, Priyanka Sarkar, Churni Ganguly, Riddhi Sen, Payel Sarkar	Eskay Movies	Thriller	
D E C E M B E R	10	Antardhaan	Arindam Bhattacharya	Parambrata Chatterjee, Tanusree Chakraborty	A Dreamliner Entertainment	Thriller	
D E C E M B E R	24	Tonic	Avijit Sen	Dev, Paran Bandopadhay, Tanusree Chakraborty	Dev Entertainment Ventures	Drama	
