= Projapati 2 =

2025 Indian Bengali-language family drama film

- Promotional poster
- Directed by: Avijit Sen
- Screenplay by: Subhadeip Das
- Dialogues by: Subhadeip Das
- Story by: Avijit Sen; Atanu Raychaudhuri
- Produced by: Gurupada Adhikari; Dev; Atanu Raychaudhuri; Pranab Kumar Guha; Swastik Bibek Ruia
- Starring: Mithun Chakraborty; Dev; Anirban Chakrabarti; Jyotirmoyee Kundu; Anumegha Kahali; Shakuntala Barua; Idhika Paul
- Cinematography: Subhankar Bhar
- Edited by: Sujay Datta Ray
- Music by: Songs: Jeet Gannguli; Background score: Rathijit Bhattacharjee
- Production companies: Dev Entertainment Ventures; Bengal Talkies
- Distributed by: SSR Cinemas
- Release date: 25 December 2025
- Running time: 150 minutes
- Country: India
- Language: Bengali
- Budget: ₹70 million

Projapati 2 (Subtitled as Bhalobasha; Bengali pronunciation: [prɔd͡ʒapoti 2]; transl. Butterfly 2) is a 2025 Indian Bengali-language culinary drama film directed by Avijit Sen. Produced by Dev and Atanu Raychaudhuri under the respective banners of Dev Entertainment Ventures and Bengal Talkies, Pranab Kumar Guha and Swastik Bibek Ruia served as its co-producers. A spiritual sequel to the 2022 blockbuster Projapati, the film stars Mithun Chakraborty and Dev in the lead roles, reuniting for the third time on-screen, alongside an ensemble cast of Anirban Chakrabarti, Jyotirmoyee Kundu (in her debut), Anumegha Kahali, Kharaj Mukherjee, Aparajita Auddy and Shakuntala Barua in other pivotal roles, with Idhika Paul in a special appearance. It revolves around a Bengali family's restaurant and home which become the backdrop for an emotional reunion as scattered generations return for a festival, forcing them to redefine their bonds and sense of belongings.

Initially titled as Protikkha, the film began its production in December 2024, marking Chakraborty's 359th and Dev's 48th film as actors. It was announced in January 2025, in the fourth collaboration between Sen and Dev, also pairing the latter with Paul for the third time. Principal photography commenced in July 2025 and wrapped by in October 2025. Predominantly shot in London and Edinburgh, portions were filmed in Kolkata. Music of the film is composed by Jeet Gannguli, while Rathijit Bhattacharjee provided its score. Subhankar Bhar and Sujay Datta Ray handled its cinematography and editing respectively.

Projapati 2 was released in the theatres on 25 December 2025, on the eve of Christmas, to positive reviews from critics and audience alike with specific appraisals of its cast performances, direction, script and musical score.

== Plot ==
After certain death of his wife, Joy Chakraborty leaves India permanently and starts living in London as a chef with his only daughter Mimmim. His father Gour Chakraborty, a restaurant owner in Kolkata, wants his son to get remarried. He, along with his wife Ganga, daughter Babi and son-in-law Bishu try a lot to convince his son for remarriage. But Joy is happy with his daughter Mimmim and do not want to marry anyone else as he still loves his late wife.

During Durga Puja vacation, while Joy along with his daughter come to India, through video call, meets with Joy's colleague Madhu who is very close to Joy's daughter. Gour Later returning back to London, Joy is sacked from his job by his jealous boss. funds 5 million INR to Joy for opening Joy's own food truck in London and also asks Joy to marry Madhu for the future of Mummum.

This 5 million INR Gour gained as an advance by selling his own beloved house to a local promoter. This shock deteriorates his health and in turn causes his death. Following his father's death, Joy decides to shift permanently again to India and renovates his father's restaurant for a fresh start as a symbol of love of a child for his father.

== Cast ==
- Mithun Chakraborty as Gour Chakraborty
- Dev as Joy Chakraborty, Gour's son
- Jyotirmoyee Kundu as Madhu
- Anumegha Kahali as Mimmim, Joy's daughter
- Aparajita Auddy as Babi, Joy's sister
- Kharaj Mukherjee as Bishu, Babi's husband
- Shakuntala Barua as Ganga, Gour's wife
- Kanchan Mallick as Gour's hotel-manager
- Partha Bhowmick as Bhajahari Kar
- Biswajit Ghosh Majumder as Ratan
- Sriparna Roy as Bhajahari's sister

=== Special appearances ===
- Paran Bandyopadhyay as Bhajahari's father
- Idhika Paul as Shree, Joy's wife
- Anirban Chakrabarti as Sakibul Hassan Jhontu
- Ambarish Bhattacharya as Keshto, wedding caterer

== Production ==
=== Development ===
Following the success of Pradhan (2023), the box-office hit trio of Dev, director Avijit Sen and producer Atanu Raychaudhuri reportedly was to collaborate for the fourth time; Sen also expressed to make a Hindi film with Dev in the lead and Raychaudhuri as producer. In February 2024 however, it was revealed that Sen met Dev and narrated two scripts, one of which titled as Protikkha was reportedly nodded by the latter, who was "keen" to work on the film, however, would finalize it only after hearing the final script, which was still progressing writing. The same month, Anandabazar Patrika noted that Mithun Chakraborty would also star in the film, reuniting with Dev for the third time after Herogiri (2015) and Projapati (2022), also collaborating with Sen and Raychaudhuri secondly after working on the latter. In August 2024, Raychaudhuri confirmed the news.

Protikkha was to be Dev's 46th film as actor, which later would be actually Khadaan (2024) as the former was usually rumoured to have a release in the Christmas weekend of 2024 as each film in this trio had always been released that time since. Principal photography was expected to commence in London from 19 November 2024, which was postponed in October 2024 due to the extremely cold weather and delayed to July 2025. On its prolongation, Raychaudhuri revealed "A little more time must be needed to dedicate to develop the film's screenplay. We are not willing to make a film by writing just haphazardly to bring two superstars."

The film had its official announcement on 2 January 2025 as Projapati 2, a spiritual successor to the 2022 film, changing its title from Protikkha.

=== Pre-production ===
"During a script meeting last year, we learned something interesting — in society, we hear about a single mother raising a child which is equally challenging for a single father, in a different way. That emotion stayed with me, and it became the core concept of the film. In Projapati, the son wanted his father to get married. In this film, the father wants his son, who is a single parent, to get married. The casting, director, and producer remain the same. There’s nostalgia, branding, and emotional continuity — so the name Projapati 2 felt right, instead of Protikkha.

— Dev on the title change of the film in an interview at The Telegraph

Cinematographer Gopi Bhagat, a long-time collaborator of Sen, exited the film due to his commitment to Manohar Pandey (2026), which led Subhankar Bhar to replace him. Sen further renewed his norm technicians—Subhadeip Das as screenwriter, Sujay Datta Ray as editor, Anindit Roy and Adeep Singh Manki as sound designer; dance choreographers Baba Yadav and Adil Shaikh also joined the technical crew in their maiden collaborations with Sen. Jeet Gannguli signed the film as the music composer in his collaborations for the second time with Sen after Tonic (2021); Rathijit Bhattacharjee, another frequent collaborator of Sen came on the board to provide its background score, (Note: Rathijit Bhattacharjee had collaborated with Avijit Sen as both song and score composer previously in Projapati (2022) and Pradhan (2023), but in Projapati 2 he served only the latter.) in his third collaboration with the latter after Projapati and Pradhan (2023).

By late-December 2024, Sen began location scouting for the film in London. Initially, the film was set to begin production in March 2025. However, the plans were rescinded owing to pre-production delays, resulting in the film's eventual commencement being pushed to July 2025.

The muhurat of the film held on 2 February 2025 at Bengal Talkies' office with the film's cast and crew, on the occasion of Vasant Panchami. Both Chakraborty and Dev had reportedly finalised looks for their respective characters at a look-test, which was reportedly in early-February 2025 at a studio in Kolkata.

=== Casting ===
Bangladeshi actress Tasnia Farin was approached to play the female lead alongside Dev in August 2024, on Raychaudhuri's proposal. However, she came out of the project in September 2024 due to the temporary halt of Indian visas regarding the July revolution in Bangladesh. (Note: Multiple references are listed here.) Nusraat Faria entered talks to replace Farin in the same month, while the makers dropped the idea to cast her for the same reason. Then the role went to Idhika Paul in May 2025, pairing with Dev for the third time after Khadaan and Raghu Dakat (2025), but she declined the role. In June 2025, TV actress Jyotirmoyee Kundu was cast in that role in her cinematic debut. In an interview to Anandabazar Patrika, on her involvement to the film, she stated "Getting the opportunity to be Dev Da's leading lady, is a bonus for me." The name of her character was revealed to be Madhu in a source by Aajkaal. In addition, Paul was also reportedly roped in for an important role alongside Dev.

Shakuntala Barua joined the film in June 2025, secondly collaborating with Sen after Tonic. Later, Kharaj Mukherjee, Aparajita Auddy and Kanchan Mullick was signed to play other prominent roles. In July 2025, media reports confirmed Anirban Chakrabarti's inclusion in the film, which marks his second collaboration with Chakraborty after Shastri (2024) and third collaboration with Dev after Pradhan and Khadaan. Anumegha Kahali, the then-anchor of Dance Bangla Dance – Season 13 who previously shared screen with Chakraborty in Kabuliwala (2023), was auditioned and selected to play the daughter of Dev's character in the film.

=== Filming ===
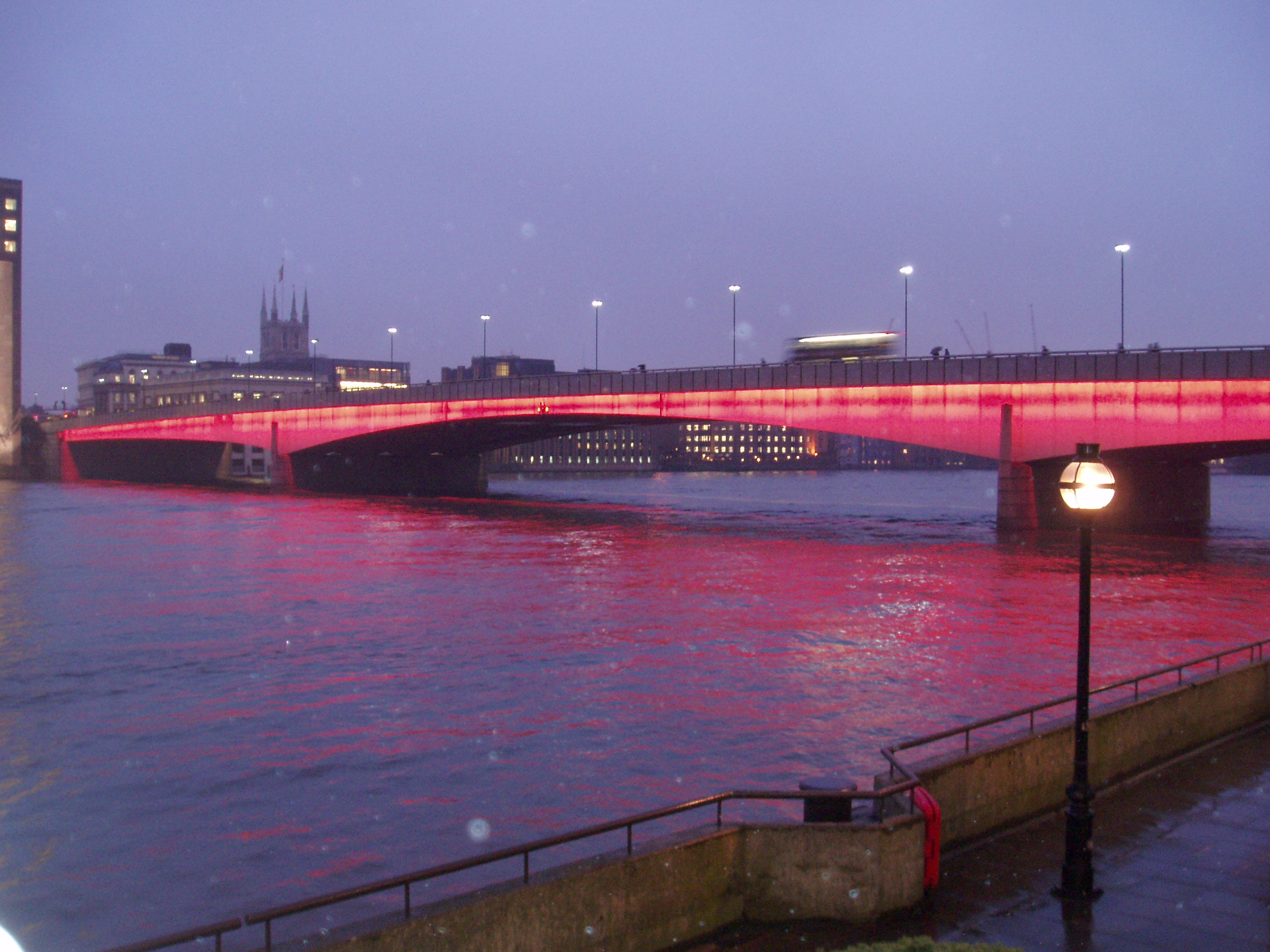
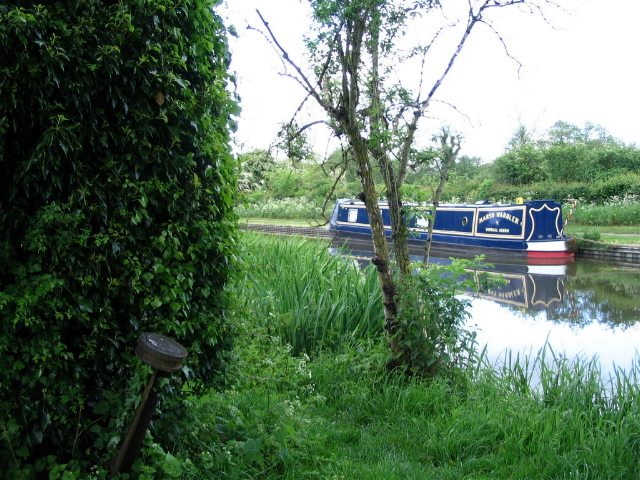
The film was predominantly shot in London.

Principal photography began with the first schedule on 5 July 2025 in London. Sen reportedly completed some portions in 7 days, which were supposed to take 10 days. A crucial scene was filmed in Stratford-upon-Avon with Chakraborty and Dev. The Indian Cricket team was invited in the sets of the film following their victory in 2-match series, when the shooting took place in Birmingham. On 12 July, filming took place on London Bridge which was revealed by Dev through a post on Instagram, evoking memories of the shooting of the song "Police Chorer Preme Porechhe" from his 2012 film Challenge 2 there. The first schedule was wrapped by on 15 July 2025. In early-August 2025, filming moved to Edinburgh for some song sequences with a little schedule.

The second schedule of the film began on 6 September 2025 in Kolkata. Paul began filming in this schedule. Filming wrapped by on 30 October 2025 with a Durga Puja song sequence, picturised on Chakraborty and Dev under the choreography by Yadav, at a massively erected set which was built at Bharatlaxmi Studio prior to the commencement of this schedule, in September, under the supervision by Ananda Adhya.

== Music ==
Jeet Gannguli composed the soundtrack of the film; it marks his eighth and twentieth collaborations with Chakraborty and Dev respectively, after working with the former on Yuddho (2005), MLA Fatakeshto (2006), Minister Fatakeshto (2007), Tiger (2007), Herogiri (2015), Jole Jongole (2018) and Shontaan (2024), and with the latter on I Love You (2007), Premer Kahini (2008), Mon Mane Na (2008), Challenge (2009), Paran Jai Jaliya Re (2009), Dujone (2009), Bolo Na Tumi Aamar (2010), Dui Prithibi (2010), Shedin Dekha Hoyechilo (2010), Paglu (2011), Romeo (2011), Paglu 2 (2012), Challenge 2 (2012), Rangbaaz (2013), Herogiri (2015), Love Express (2016), Chaamp (2017), Kidnap (2019) and Tonic. Rathijit Bhattacharjee provided its background score, in his fifth collaboration with Dev after Projapati, Pradhan, Khadaan and Raghu Dakat.

The soundtrack of Projapati 2 preceded with five singles composed by Gannguli: "Love You Papa" was the first to be released on 14 November 2023. It was followed by the second single "Projapati Song" on 24 November, "Hasli Keno Bol" on 6 December, "Maa Esheche" on 16 December and "Aaj Theme Jaak" released on 25 December 2025, whereas Prasen and Priyo Chattopadhyay penned the lyrics; "Joy Panta", an instrumental theme from the original score was composed by Bhattacharjee.

== Marketing ==
The teaser of Projapati 2 was exclusively attached to the prints of Raghu Dakat (also starring Dev), Raktabeej 2 and Devi Chowdhurani for theatrical screenings, all of them released in Durga Puja.

The first poster of the film was unveiled on 1 November 2025. The teaser was officially released on 10 November 2025 with an extended version of 96 seconds, upgraded from the a-minute longer version screened in theatres previously. The trailer of the film was released on 22 December 2025.

Despite posters being hung outside the hall, the film did not get screening slots and advance bookings at Navina cinema hall, one of the famous single screen theatres where Dev's films had created several box-office records.

The film had a premiere on 3 January 2026, attended by Srijit Mukherji, Rukmini Maitra and other film personalities. After the success of the film, Dev visited the Boro Maa Kali Temple at Naihati to seek blessings, along with Sen and Kundu on 4 January 2026.

== Release ==
=== Theatrical ===
Projapati 2 is theatrically released on 25 December 2025, with 256 screens across West Bengal, coinciding with Dev’s birthday and Christmas. It clashed with Mitin: Ekti Khunir Sandhaney and Lawho Gouranger Naam Rey.

Projapati 2 became the first Bengali flim to get released in Saudi Arabia.

=== Home media ===
The digital streaming rights for Projapati 2 were acquired by ZEE5 for ₹12 crore. The film began streaming from 27 March 2026.

== Reception ==
=== Box office ===
Projapati 2 opened to thunderous response earning ₹1.65 crore on its first day, being the fourth highest opener in the domestic Bengali market after Dhumketu (2025), Amazon Obhijaan (2017) and Chander Pahar (2013). Reportedly, it led the box-office in the clash and gained 1,63,800 footfalls and Rs. 2.25 crore nett collection over its first five days, beating the footfalls of Dhurandhar in West Bengal.

It became the second highest-grossing Bengali franchise at that time, until the release of Vijaynagar'er Hirey of SVF Kakababu franchise in January 2026.

=== Critical reception ===
Raima Ganguly of The Times of India rated the film 3.5 out of 5 stars and opined "Projapati 2 knows exactly what it wants to be and wears its commercial heart on its sleeve. Mithun Chakraborty delivers a performance rooted in quiet strength and lived-in emotion. Dev looks effortlessly dapper throughout, carrying the film with ease and confidence." She also praised Kahali's performance, addressing her as "the surprise package" and Gannguli's music. Anurupa Chakraborty of The Indian Express rated the film 4 out of 5 stars and wrote "The father-son bond is beautifully captured in this simple meal of leftover rice". She also added that seeing Mithun and Dev together in this picture, one can only exclaim, "Joy Guru!"

Rinika Roy Chowdhury of Ei Samay reviewed the film and wrote "There is no exaggeration, no artificiality anywhere—it naturally touches the hearts of the viewers. Instead of heroic swagger, Dev's performance here is marked by a sense of responsibility and sensitivity. Mithun Chakraborty's presence deepens the emotional impact of the film." She also praised the cinematography, editing and soundtrack. A reviewer of Aaj Tak highlighted "It has been proven once again that Dev never lags behind in the competition, who understands perfectly how to balance commercial and family-oriented films." She also considered the film as a "Mithun Chakraborty vehicle".

Addressing Chakraborty as "the emotional backbone of the film", Souvik Saha of Cine Kolkata rated the film 3/5 stars and opined "The culinary angle, chef challenges and food-related conflicts are woven naturally into the story. From London-to-Kolkata transitions to the authentic bhater hotel setting, the film retains a strong Bengali essence, reflecting middle-class struggles and familial bonds. Music by Jeet Gannguli, particularly Nachiketa’s standout track, elevate key moments." He also praised its cinematography, editing and punchlines by Das. Sharmistha Ghosal of Indulge Express quoted "There is nothing to reiterate about the presence and performance of Mithun Chakraborty, who spontaneously turns on his natural flair on the screen. A special mention must be made of Kharaj Mukherjee – Tulsi Chakraborty of our generation – who can elicit laughter even during predictable moments. But the one person who steals the show and owns the film from the beginning to the end is Dev. He’s not only looking smart and dapper as he always does, but he also steals the moments with poise, grace and restraint of a mature actor." She also cited Kahali as "the true lady superstar of the film", who matched her tiny steps with Chakraborty and Dev with aplomb.

Dipanwita Ghosh Mukherjee of Anandabazar Patrika rated the film 3/5 stars and wrote "The director has depicted the continuous flow of dreaming, having those dreams shattered, and then piecing together the fragments to build new dreams, which is so characteristic of ordinary middle-class families; this film will also evoke even more emotions." She also added that there's no need to mention Mithun Chakraborty separately, whose performance spoke for itself, and also Dev had delivered another incredibly mature performance.

== Accolades ==
Award	Ceremony date	Category	Recipient(s)	Result
9th WBFJA Awards	11 January 2026	Most Popular Film	Projapati 2	Nominated
9th WBFJA Awards	11 January 2026	Best Actor (Male)	Dev	Won
9th WBFJA Awards	11 January 2026	Best Director	Avijit Sen	Nominated
9th WBFJA Awards	11 January 2026	Best Music Director	Jeet Gannguli	Won
9th WBFJA Awards	11 January 2026	Best Playback Singer (Male)	Jeet Gannguli	Nominated
9th WBFJA Awards	11 January 2026	Best Promising Actor (Female)	Anumegha Kahali	Nominated
9th WBFJA Awards	11 January 2026	Best Promising Actor in a Comic Role	Kharaj Mukherjee	Won
