= Filmfare Award Bangla for Best Film =

Indian film award

Filmfare Awards Bangla for Best Film
- Awarded for: Best Film
- Country: India
- Presented by: Filmfare
- First award: Chander Pahar (2014)
- Currently held by: Bohurupi (2025)
- Website: Filmfare Awards Bangla

The Filmfare Award Bangla for Best Film is an award presented annually at the Filmfare Awards Bangla to the best Bengali film according to a jury. It is given by the Filmfare magazine of the Times Group as a part of the Bengali segment of the Filmfare Awards.

== Superlatives ==
Superlatives by studio(s)

Superlative	Studio(s)	Record
Most awards	Shree Venkatesh Films	4
Most nominations	Shree Venkatesh Films	13
Most nominations without ever winning	Friends Communication	5

=== Most wins ===
Wins by Studio(s)

Studio	Number of wins	Years
Shree Venkatesh Films	4	2014, 2017, 2021, 2023
Surinder Films	2	2022, 2024
Dev Entertainment Ventures	1	2022
Opera Productions	1	2023
Kathak Talkies	1	2018
Windows Production	1	2025

=== Most nominations ===
Nominations by Studio(s)

Studio	Number of Nominations	Number of wins
Shree Venkatesh Films	13	4
Dev Entertainment Ventures	5	1
Friends Communication	5	0
Windows Production	5	1
Surinder Films	4	2
Camellia Production	2	0

== List of winners and nominees ==
Table key
‡	Indicates the winner

=== 2010s ===
Year	Film	Studio(s)
2014 (1st)
2014 (1st)	Chander Pahar ‡	Shree Venkatesh Films
2014 (1st)	Alik Sukh	Windows Production
2014 (1st)	Mishawr Rawhoshyo	Shree Venkatesh Films
2014 (1st)	Phoring	GBC Enterprise and Chitrabeekshan Audio Visual
2014 (1st)	Shobdo	Brand Value Communication
2015	NO CEREMONY	
2016	NO CEREMONY	
2017 (2nd)
2017 (2nd)	Cinemawala ‡	Shree Venkatesh Films
2017 (2nd)	Double Feluda	Eros International
2017 (2nd)	Eagoler Chokh	Shree Venkatesh Films
2017 (2nd)	Praktan	Windows Production
2017 (2nd)	Shaheb Bibi Golaam	Friends Communication
2017 (2nd)	Shankhachil	Ashirbad Cholochitro, Impress Telefilm Limited & NIdeas Creations & Productions
2018 (3rd)
2018 (3rd)	Bishorjan ‡	Opera Productions
2018 (3rd)	Amazon Obhijaan	Shree Venkatesh Films
2018 (3rd)	Bibaho Diaries	Camellia Productions
2018 (3rd)	Maacher Jhol	Sony Pictures Networks, Mojo Productions
2018 (3rd)	Mayurakshi	Friends Communication
2018 (3rd)	Sahaj Paather Gappo	Avijit Saha
2019	NO CEREMONY	

=== 2020s ===
Year	Film	Studio(s)
2020	NO CEREMONY	
2021 (4th)
2021 (4th)	Vinci Da ‡	Shree Venkatesh Films
2021 (4th)	Gumnaami	Shree Venkatesh Films
2021 (4th)	Konttho	Windows Production
2021 (4th)	Mitin Mashi	Camellia Production
2021 (4th)	Parineeta	Raj Chakraborty Entertainment
2021 (4th)	Sanjhbati	Bengal Talkies
2022 (5th)
2022 (5th)	Borunbabur Bondhu ‡	Surinder Films
2022 (5th)	Tonic ‡	Dev Entertainment Ventures
2022 (5th)	Dwitiyo Purush	Shree Venkatesh Films
2022 (5th)	Golondaaj	Shree Venkatesh Films
2022 (5th)	Hiralal	Easel Movies
2022 (5th)	Switzerland	Jeetz Filmworks & Grassroot Entertainment
2023 (6th)
2023 (6th)	Dostojee ‡	Kathak Talkies
2023 (6th)	Ballabhpurer Roopkotha ‡	Shree Venkatesh Films
2023 (6th)	Abhijaan	Roadshow Films, Ratnashree Nirman
2023 (6th)	Aparajito	Friends Communication
2023 (6th)	Boudi Canteen	Roadshow Films
2023 (6th)	Karnasubarner Guptodhon	Shree Venkatesh Films
2023 (6th)	Projapoti	Dev Entertainment Ventures
2024 (7th)
2024 (7th)	Ardhangini ‡	Surinder Films
2024 (7th)	Bagha Jatin	Dev Entertainment Ventures
2024 (7th)	Dawshom Awbotaar	Shree Venkatesh Films
2024 (7th)	Kabuliwala	Shree Venkatesh Films
2024 (7th)	Pradhan	Dev Entertainment Ventures
2024 (7th)	Raktabeej	Windows Production
2025 (8th)
2025 (8th)	Bohurupi ‡	Windows Production
2025 (8th)	Ajogyo	Surinder Films
2025 (8th)	Chaalchitro: The Frame Fatale	Friends Communication
2025 (8th)	Khadaan	Surinder Films & Dev Entertainment Ventures
2025 (8th)	Padatik	Friends Communication
2025 (8th)	Shontaan	Shree Venkatesh Films
