= Avijit Sen =

Indian filmmaker, editor and screenwriter (born 1976)

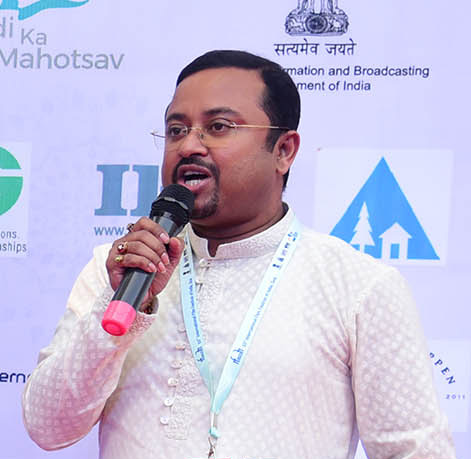
- Sen in 2022
- Born: 6 September 1976 (age 50); Birati, West Bengal
- Education: Birati High School
- Alma mater: Satyajit Ray Film and Television Institute
- Occupations: Film director; Screenwriter; Editor; Professor
- Years active: 2006–present

Avijit Sen (pronounced [obʱid͡ʒit ʃen]; born 6 September 1976) is an Indian film director, editor and screenwriter who predominantly works in the Bengali Film Industry. Known for directing family drama and social drama films which incorporate deep emotions and social message, he is one of the highest paid directors in Bengali Cinema and a recipient of the Best Director Award at Filmfare Awards Bangla, Anandalok Puraskar and others.

Sen started his career as a director and writer for popular Bengali reality shows including Didi No. 1 and Sa Re Ga Ma Pa Bangla. In 2021 he directed Tonic, making his debut in the Bengali film industry. It earned him critical acclaim and emerged as the highest-grossing Bengali film of 2021. Then he directed Projapoti in 2022. It became his most successful film as it emerged as the highest-grossing Bengali film of 2022 and one of the highest-grossing Bengali films of all time. This was followed by Pradhan in 2023, which emerged as the second highest-grossing Bengali film of 2023.

== Early life and education ==
Avijit Sen was born on 6 September 1976 in Birati, West Bengal. He grew up in Birati and continues to reside there, in his ancestral house. He completed his primary schooling from Uttarayan Shishu Vidyalaya and secondary schooling from Birati High School. Sen took interest in performing stage acts from his school life. Besides performing in his school plays, he used to be the editor for his school magazine, which was rolled out once in a year. He wrote as well as directed his first stage act while he was in the tenth grade.

After school, he joined a local theatre group in Birati and later also worked with another theatre group "Shudrag". He used to participate in theatrical acts and plays held across the country in cities including Delhi, Pune, Bangalore, Mumbai and Allahabad. Sen graduated in film-making from Satyajit Ray Film and Television Institute in 2004. He worked as an editor in an animation company before his admission into the SRFTI in 2001. He also served as the faculty in-charge at the Editing Department of the Film and Television Institute of India. After that he also served as a full-time lecturer at St. Xavier's College, Kolkata. After working as a lecturer at St. Xavier's College, he joined Zee Bangla in 2009 and worked in the marketing department of films. In 2010, he got his first major breakthrough as a director after he conceived the concept of Didi No. 1.

== Career ==
=== Early career ===
In the initial days of his film-making career, he worked as an associate with Rajkumar Hirani. Sen met Hirani through Arghyakamal Mitra, who was then looking for an assistant director cum editor for his upcoming film. Eventually, he assisted Hirani in Lage Raho Munna Bhai and 3 Idiots, besides working as the costume designer for those films.

Sen started his career as a director and writer for popular Bengali reality shows including Dadagiri Unlimited, Sa Re Ga Ma Pa Bangla, Dance Bangla Dance, Didi No. 1 and Tumi Je Amar. He has directed all episodes of Dadagiri Unlimited and Dance Bangla Dance from 2023, and the other three shows from their inaugural seasons. Presently as of 2025, he continues directing all the above-mentioned reality shows besides working as a film director.

=== Film directorial debut and success ===
Sen has collaborated with RayChaudhuri as the producer for all his further films. Tonic marked Avijit Sen's directorial debut in films. The film was widely applauded and appreciated for its light comedy, simple storyline, vibrant locales and chemistry between Dev and Paran Bandyopadhyay. It emerged as the highest-grossing Bengali film of 2021 and garnered him critical acclaim. At the 5th Filmfare Awards Bangla, the film won the Best Film and Best Actor (Paran Bandyopadhyay) Awards and also earned him the Best Debut Director Award.

His next directorial was Projapati in 2022. He got the idea about the core concept of the film, after he read an article in a newspaper about a retired teacher who married at an old age, just to have a companion by his side, in old age. The film was applauded as an emotional family entertainer that highlights the social issues, although the ending melodrama was bemoaned. It became his most successful film and emerged as the highest-grossing Bengali film of 2022 as well as one of the highest grossing Bengali films of all time. It won the "Most Popular Film" and "Most Popular Actor" (Mithun Chakraborty) Award at the 6th WBFJA Awards.

In 2023, he directed Pradhan, which emerged as the second highest-grossing Bengali film of 2023. A social drama, the film was praised for its commercial approach while keeping close to the Bengali culture instead of displaying over the top scenes like most commercial potboilers. It won the "Most Popular Film" and "Most Popular Actor" (Dev) Award at the 7th WBFJA Award. His next directorial Projapati 2, which is a sequel to his 2022 film Projapati, was announced on 1 January 2025. It was released in the theatres on 25 December 2025, coinciding with Christmas.

== Filmography ==
Key
†	Denotes films that have not yet been released

Year	Film	Director	Writer	Language	Notes	Ref.
2021	Tonic	Yes	Yes	Bengali	Marked his debut as a director in Bengali films	
2022	Projapati	Yes	Yes	Bengali		
2023	Pradhan	Yes	Yes	Bengali		
2025	Projapati 2	Yes	Yes	Bengali		
2026	Tonic 2 †	Yes	Yes	Bengali		

== Filmmaking style ==
In the initial days of his film-making career, he worked as an associate with Rajkumar Hirani. He assisted him in Lage Raho Munna Bhai and 3 Idiots, besides working in a few commercial shoots. He attributes his style of film-making as one which is inspired from Rajkumar Hirani. He mentioned in an interview that he got his knack of telling relatable human stories from Hirani, who told him that well scripted life stories always appeal to human emotions.

Sen's films display deep emotional attachment and detachments among the various relations in a family. His films don't revolve around a conventional lead pair but focus on the cavernous bonding between the lead hero and one to two senior parallel lead characters. Monologues with specific focus on the emotions displayed by the characters are a signature style of his movies.

== Recurring collaborations ==
Sen has collaborated with Dev as the lead actor in all of his films. Ambarish Bhattacharya, Biswanath Basu, Koneenica Banerjee and Kharaj Mukherjee have played supporting roles in most the films while Sujay Datta Ray has been the editor. Only people with two or more collaborations are listed.

Films	Dev	Mithun Chakraborty	Ambarish Bhattacharya	Biswanath Basu	Koneenica Banerjee	Mamata Shankar	Kharaj Mukherjee	Kanchan Mullick	Paran Bandopadhyay	Anupam Roy	Rathijit Bhattacharjee	Sujay Datta Ray	Gopi Bhagat
Tonic (2021)	check		check	check	check			check	check			check	
Projapati (2022)	check	check	check	check	check	check	check			check	check	check	check
Pradhan (2023)	check		check	check	check	check	check	check	check	check	check	check	check
Projapati 2 (2025)	check	check	check				check	check	check		check	check	

== Accolades ==
Year	Award	Category	Film	Result	Ref.
2022	5th Filmfare Awards Bangla	Filmfare Award Bangla for Best Director	Tonic	Nominated	
2022	5th Filmfare Awards Bangla	Filmfare Award Bangla for Best Debut Director	Tonic	Won	
2022	Anandalok Puraskar	Anandalok Puraskar for Best Director	Tonic	Nominated	
2022	Anandalok Puraskar	Anandalok Puraskar for Most Promising Director	Tonic	Won	
2023	6th Filmfare Awards Bangla	Filmfare Award Bangla for Best Director	Projapoti	Nominated	
2023	6th Filmfare Awards Bangla	Filmfare Award Bangla for Best Story	Projapoti	Nominated	
2023	6th WBFJA Awards	West Bengal Film Journalists' Association Award for Most Promising Director	Projapoti	Nominated	
2024	7th Filmfare Awards Bangla	Filmfare Award Bangla for Best Director	Pradhan	Nominated	
