= Royal Bioscope Company =

Film production company in Bengal

The Royal Bioscope Company
- Industry: Film production
- Founded: 1898
- Founder: Hiralal Sen, Matilal Sen, Deboki Lal Sen, Bholanath Gupta

The Royal Bioscope Company was the first film production company in Bengal, and possibly the first in India, set up in 1898 by Hiralal Sen, along with Matilal Sen, Deboki Lal Sen, and Bholanath Gupta. The initial productions used an Urban Bioscope bought from Warwick Trading Company in London. The company produced shows, generally exhibited at the Classic Theatre in Calcutta, where the films featured in the intervals in the stage shows. When Sen began producing his own films regularly they were chiefly scenes from stage productions at the Classic, between 1901 and 1904. The longest film produced was Ali Baba and the Forty Thieves (1903), again based on an original Classic Theatre staging.

Sen also made many local views and newsfilms, took commissions, made advertising films and put on private shows for members of high society. Sen was also to produce a number of short newsreels, including Anti-partition demonstration (1905), Swadeshi movement (1905), and With Our King and Queen Through India (1912). Sen also produce some of the first advertisement movies. As newer film ventures entered the marketplace, Royal Bioscope's fortunes declined, and production ceased in 1913.
