= Bhaskar Pramanik =

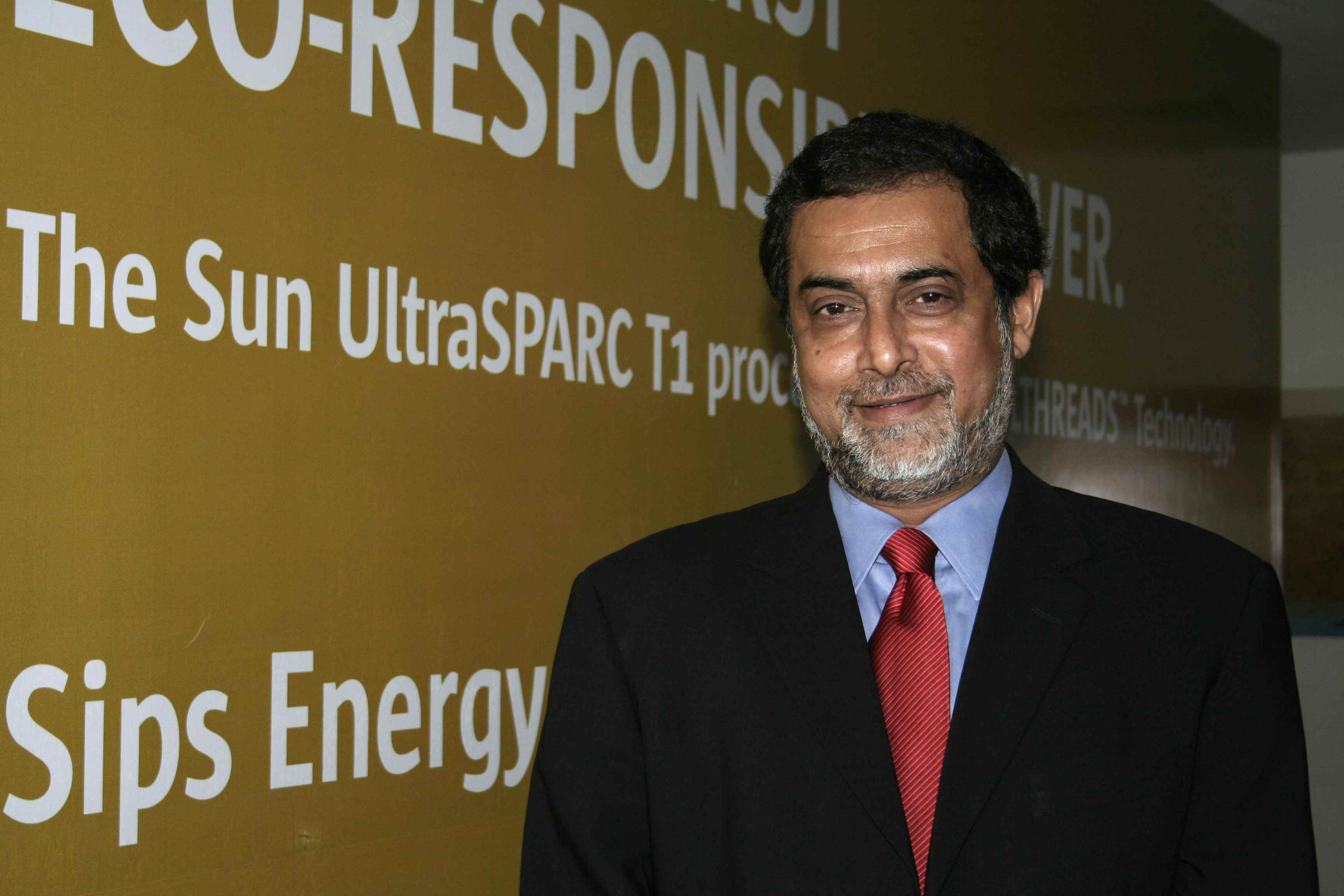
- Born: 1951 (age 74–75); West Bengal, India
- Education: Indian Institute of Technology Kanpur

Bhaskar Pramanik (born 1951) is the former chairman of Microsoft India. He looked after the company's overall sales, marketing and all other transactions across India. He retired from Microsoft in September 2017.

Pramanik resigned from Oracle India to join Microsoft India. Before Oracle, he was the corporate vice president and president, India GEM of Sun Microsystems India. He was responsible for the overall operations of the subsidiary in India. He is now one of the independent director in central board of State Bank of India.

== Early days ==
Pramanik is a 1972 engineering graduate from the Indian Institute of Technology, Kanpur. He has also attended the Advanced Marketing Management Program at the Stanford University.

Pramanik has more than 30 years experience in the Indian IT industry.

Prior to joining Sun Microsystems, Pramanik took up several senior management positions in companies like Digital Equipment India Ltd., Blue Star Ltd., and NELCO. At Digital Equipment India Ltd., He was the director of Enterprise Sales (Asia-Pacific) at Singapore. In his earlier role as vice-president, sales & marketing, Digital Equipment India Ltd. Pramanik was part of the original Country Management Team which was responsible for setting up the joint venture in India.

Pramanik became Managing Director of Oracle India on 1 April 2010 and left Oracle in less than a period of a year (Left on 3 March 2011) to hold the position of Chairman of Microsoft India from 28 March 2011. As Chairman of Microsoft India, he reported directly to Jean-Philippe Courtois who is currently the President of Microsoft International.

== Career at Sun ==
Pramanik joined Sun Microsystems in November 1997 and has been instrumental in building Sun's presence in India. Pramanik has received many outstanding achievement awards in Sun over the last 8 years. In October 2004, Pramanik received the Sun Leadership award. The Leadership Award recognizes outstanding Leaders at Sun who lead the company forward in a manner consistent with Sun values and demonstrate consistent business results while modelling the values.

Pramanik co-chairs the Leadership Awards Review Board in Sun for 2005 and 2006.

== Sun Microsystems in India ==
Sun Microsystems established a wholly owned subsidiary in India on 1 July 1998 and is spread across numerous locations in India via its strong distributor and partner network, which supports an installed base of over 100,000+ systems.

Sun’s key India partners include Wipro, TCS, HCL Infosystems, CMC, Accel Frontline, Redington, CDAC, and eSys.

The Sun India Engineering Centre, the first in Asia was set up in Bangalore in 1998, is part of the Global Engineering Organization at Sun, providing core competency in support of Sun's engineering operations and supports over 1200 engineers.

== Indian IT Industry Achievements ==
Pramanik has been actively involved with the Indian IT industry since 1982 and is a regular speaker on computer & telecom related subjects at public forums and industry meetings. He is a member of various committees in CII, MAIT, NASSCOM and was the chairman of the American Chamber of Commerce, Karnataka, in 2003–2004. He is a member of the Executive Council of NASSCOM.
