= Alexx O'Nell =

American film and television actor (born 1980)

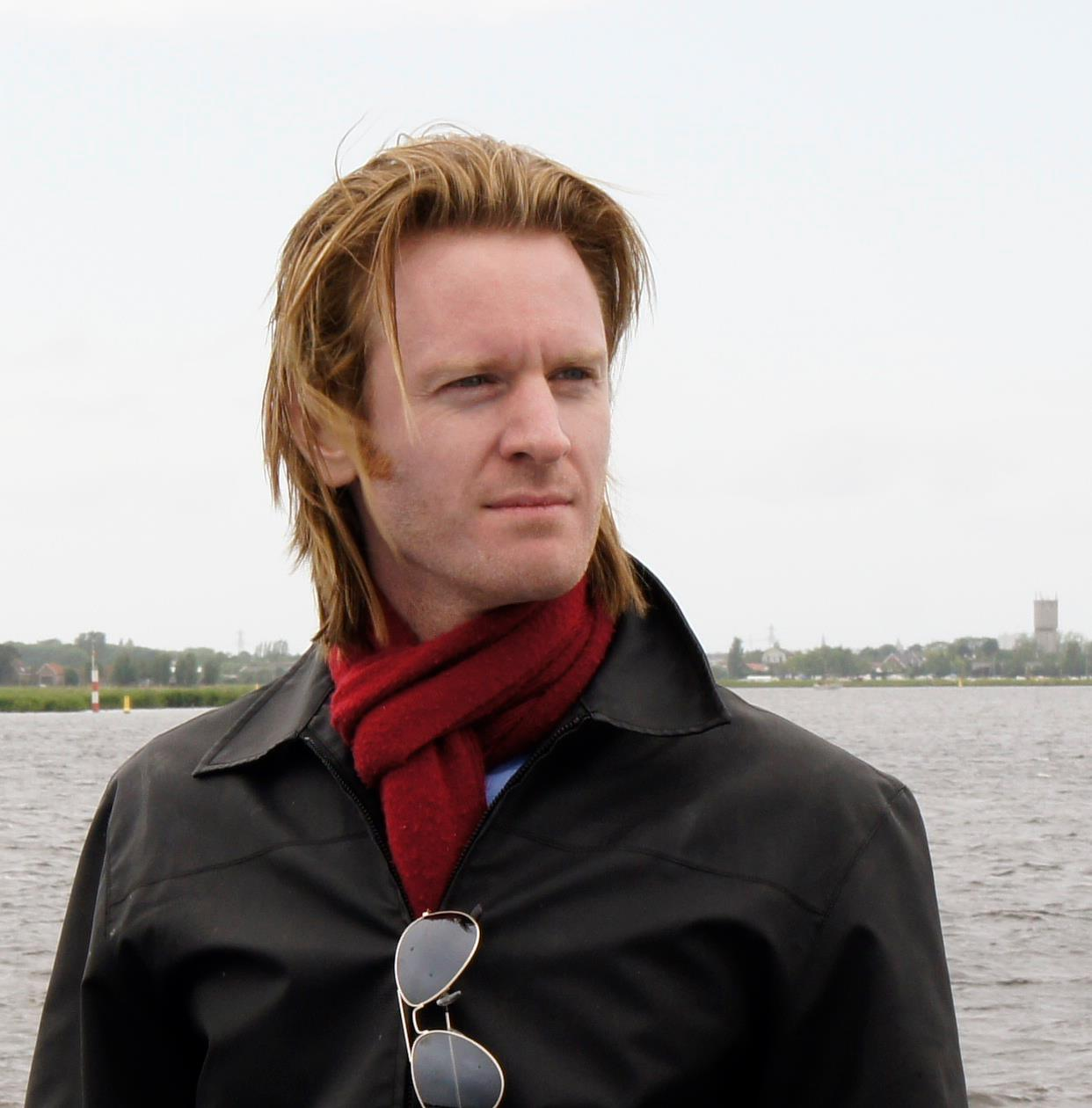
- Born: Alexander Leonard O' Neill; 26 July 1980 (age 46); Madison, Connecticut, United States
- Education: Boston University
- Occupations: Actor; musician
- Years active: 2007–present
- Height: 6 ft 0 in (1.83 m)
- Spouse: Sweta Keswani (m. 2008; div. 2011)
- Partner: Shama Sikander (2011–2015)

Alexander Leonard O'Neill (born 26 July 1980) is an American actor and musician who has appeared in more than 60 Indian film and television roles. He is best known for L2: Empuraan, Ae Watan Mere Watan, Khufiya, Golondaaj, Roohi, Main Aur Charles, Cheeni Kum, Madrasapattinam, Yeti Obhijaan, Chittagong and Urumi.

== Career ==
Before pursuing acting, O'Nell worked at a Connecticut-based marketing firm Lester Inc. His job took him to India, Philippines, the UK, and South Africa. After doing community and regional theater in the U.S. for a while, he appeared in advertisements for Hyundai, Lenovo, Captain Morgan, Roma Switches, Panasonic, Finolex, 7 Up and eSys. He was the brand ambassador for Mouin Glaciere perfumes from 2006 to 2009.

=== Film and television ===
==== Hindi-language cinema ====
O'Nell played a small role in the English comedy Loins of Punjab Presents (2007). His first cinematic release was the dry Hindi-language comedy Cheeni Kum (2007) in which he plays a bumbling English waiter with a turbulent relationship with his boss Amitabh Bachchan. In the same year, O'Nell appeared as a contestant on season three of the Indian celebrity dance competition Nach Baliye where he was paired with actor Sweta Keswani. He is the first non-Indian participant on the show by that time.

In 2009, O'Nell played Sweta Keswani's husband in Rohit Roy's made-for-television film Chaar Mulakatein. He was next seen inMalik Ek (2010) featuring Jackie Shroff, Smriti Irani, Rajeshwari Sachdeva, Shakti Kapoor, and Divya Dutta.

O'Nell returned to television for Zee TV's historical drama Jhansi Ki Rani, playing Robert Ellis, a British officer sympathetic to the Rani Laxmi Bai-led 1850s revolutionary struggle against the colonial rule. His character is loosely based on the eponymous historical figure whose relationship with Rani Laxmi Bai is the subject of a fictional book Rani by Jaishree Misra. The book attracted significant controversy for historical revisionism, and was subsequently banned in present-day Jhansi. O'Nell also appeared in a guest role on the Star One TV's Dhoondh Legi Manzil Humein as Ralph, the protagonist's abusive boyfriend.

O'Nell had a supporting role in the contemporary drama Jo Dooba So Paar (2011) alongside Vinay Pathak and Rajat Kapoor. He played an American whose Italian girlfriend gets abducted in Bihar, India. The film opened to extremely mixed review; Rajeev Masand from CNN IBN called it "as boring as watching paint dry," while Nikhat Kazmi from The Times of India praised it for "holding up a charming mirror on the small town milieu."

In early 2012, O'Nell appeared in Chittagong, a period drama based on the historical events surrounding the 1930 East Indian Chittagong armoury raid. He played Charles Johnson, a lawful British official pitted against an Indian school teacher who, alongside a group of freedom fighters rally against the colonial rule by seizing weapons from police and auxiliary force armouries. The film also stars Manoj Bajpai, Nawazuddin Siddique, and India-based British actor Barry John. Chittagong received positive reviews from the critics, with Taran Adarsh saying that the ensemble cast, including O'Nell, "leave a tremendous impression in their respective roles". The film won three National Film Awards. O'Nell also appeared in Shirish Kunder's 2012 film Joker alongside Akshay Kumar and Sonakshi Sinha.

O'Nell was seen in Prawaal Raman's Main Aur Charles (2015) based on the Tihar Jailbreak of 1986 during which O'Nell's Richard Thomas was the unwilling accomplice to Randeep Hooda's Charles Sobhraj, and eventually became his undoing as the state's-witness in the ensuing trial. O'Nell was praised by Filmfare and Hollywood Director Michael Hoffman for his "solid supporting performance".

O'Nell has appeared in Bose Dead/Alive (2017, ALTBalaji miniseries), Inside Edge (2017; Amazon Originals series), Tigmanshu Dhulia's Raag Desh (2017), Roohi (2021), Ae Watan Mere Watan(2024), Khufiya (2023), Phule(2025) and Kesari Chapter 2: The Untold Story of Jallianwala Bagh (2025).

Amazon Prime Video's Bak Bak starring O'Nell and Divya Dutta is expected to release in 2026.

==== South Indian cinema ====
His breakthrough role came in 2010 with the Tamil 1940s period drama Madrasapattinam in which he starred opposite Amy Jackson and Arya. The film became the 4th highest-grossing film in Kollywood that year, despite not faring well outside of Tamil Nadu. Madrasapattinam was re-released as 1947: A Love Story in Telugu in August 2011.

In 2011, O'Nell was cast in Santosh Sivan's Malayalam film Urumi after being recommended by Madrasapattinam director A. L. Vijay and his costar Italian actor Sita Spada, his co-star in Jo Dooba So Paar. He plays the dual role of 15th century explorer Vasco Da Gama and his son Estêvão da Gama. Urumi received widespread critical acclaim, and is considered to be one of the defining films of the Malayalam New Wave. He teamed up with his A. L. Vijay again for a minor role in Thaandavam (2012).

Gangster (2014) and Manglish (2014), both featuring O'Nell alongside South-Indian actor Mammootty, cemented his position in South-Indian cinema. He has since appeared in Lucifer (2019), SyeRaa(2019), RRR (2022), Sweet Kaaram Coffee (2023; Amazon's first Original Series in Tamil) and Captain Miller (2024), and L2: Empuraan (2025).

==== Bengali cinema ====
O'Nell has also worked in the Tollywood since his debut in 2017 as the main antagonist in Yeti Obhijaan. His role in Golondaaj (2021), alongside Dev Adhikari, earned him a Best Actor nomination from the West Bengal Film Journalists Association in 2022. His most recent Bengali film Pokkhirajer Dim (2025) has received commercial and critical acclaim. He will be seen in Devi Chowdhurani and Raghu Dakat in late-2025.

== Personal life ==
The son of a Dutch mother and an Irish-American father, O'Nell was born in Connecticut and has one sister.

He married actor Sweta Keswani in 2007 in four different ceremonies including Buddhist, Hindu, and Christian. The couple separated and divorced in 2011. O’Nell was in a relationship with Shama Sikander from 2011 to 2015.

== Filmography ==
Key
†	Denotes films that have not yet been released

=== Films ===
Year	Film	Role	Language
2007	Loins of Punjab Presents	Wesminton	English
2007	Cheeni Kum	English Waiter	Hindi
2009	Chaar Mulakatein	Unknown	Hindi
2010	Madrasapattinam	Robert Ellis	Tamil
2010	Malik Ek	MacMillian	Hindi
2011	Jo Dooba So Paar	Mike	Hindi
2012	Urumi	Vasco da Gama, Estêvão da Gama and John Thomas (Triple role)	Malayalam
2012	Chittagong	Charles Johnson	Hindi
2012	Joker	Simon	Hindi
2012	Thaandavam	Foreign Spy	Tamil
2014	Gangster	Tom	Malayalam
2014	Manglish	Kevin	Malayalam
2015	Umrika	John	Hindi
2015	Main Aur Charles	Richard	Hindi
2016	Doctor Rakhmabai	Dr. David	Marathi
2017	Raagdesh	Lt. Col. P. Walsh	Hindi
2017	Yeti Obhijaan	Caine Shipton	Bengali
2018	Ek Je Chhilo Raja	Rankin	Bengali
2018	Saheb, Biwi Aur Gangster 3	Stephen	Hindi
2019	Lucifer	Robert McCarthy	Malayalam
2019	Sye Raa Narasimha Reddy	General Watson	Telugu
2019	Trial of Satyam Kaushik	Captain Richard Johnson	Hindi
2019	Banarasi Jasoos	Frank	Hindi
2021	Roohi	Tim	Hindi
2021	Chehre	Richard Alexander	Hindi
2021	Bhoot Police		Hindi
2021	Golondaaj	Major Frederick Jackson	Bengali
2022	RRR	British officer	Telugu
2023	Khufiya	Dr. David White	Hindi
2024	Captain Miller	Riley	Tamil
2024	Ae Watan Mere Watan	John Lyre	Hindi
2025	L2: Empuraan	Robert McCarthy	Malayalam
2025	Kesari Chapter 2	Lord Chelmsford	Hindi
2025	Phule	Ribbs Jones	Hindi
2025	Pokkhirajer Dim	Villain Saheb	Bengali
2025	Raghu Dakat	Duncan	Bengali
2025	Devi Chowdhurani	Captain Munroe	Bengali
2025	Thamma	Alexander / Sikander	Hindi
2026	Bhooth Bangla	Richard Gardener	Hindi

=== Television ===
Year	Title	Role	Channel
2007	Nach Baliye	Contestant	StarPlus
2009-2010	Jhansi Ki Rani	Robert Ellis	Zee TV
2010	Dhoondh Legi Manzil Humein	Ralph	Star One
2016	Chandra Nandini	Alexander The Great	StarPlus
2017	Inside Edge	Craig Litner	Amazon Prime Video
2017	Bose: Dead/Alive	Anderson	ALTBalaji
2018	21 Sarfarosh – Saragarhi 1897	Winston Churchill	Discovery Jeet
2020	Aarya	Bob Wilson	Disney+ Hotstar
2021	Robindronath Ekhane Kawkhono Khete Aashenni	Norman	Hoichoi
2023	Sweet Kaaram Coffee	Robert	Amazon Prime Video

== Discography ==
Year	Title	Vocals	MusicVideo
2020	''Still On My Mind''	Arijit Singh (Backing vocals), Himself	www.AlexxONell.com/StillOnMyMindMusicVideo
2021	''Twenty Days''	Himself	www.AlexxONell.com/TwentyDaysMusicVideo
2023	''These Four Walls''	Himself	www.AlexxONell.com/TheseFourWallsMusicVideo
2023	''These Four Walls- Acoustic''	Himself	www.AlexxONell.com/TheseFourWallsAcousticMusicVideo
2024	''Pride''	Himself	www.AlexxONell.com/PrideMusicVideo
2024	''Ghosts''	Himself	www.AlexxONell.com/GhostsMusicVideo
