= Sarbadhikari =

Indian people with the title Sarbadhikari belong to a Bengali Kulin Kayastha Bose family whose recorded genealogy goes back to more than 500 years.

The Sarbadhikari family was founded during the early 15th century by Sureshwar Bosu of Choa ("Choa" is a village situated in Murshidabad district of present-day West Bengal), who was appointed Governor of Orissa province with the hereditary title of "Sarbadhikari" by the Imperial Court of Delhi.

Some of the descendants include:

- Berry Sarbadhikari (died 1976), Indian cricket commentator
- Deva Prasad Sarbadhikari (1862–1935), Indian lawyer and educationist
- Nagendra Prasad Sarbadhikari (1869–1940), who introduced football in India
- Subhash Sarbadhikari, Indian association football player
- Gautam Sarbadhikari (born 1959), Railway Operations SERLY Division

== See also ==
- Indian family name
- List of most popular family names#India
