= Berry Sarbadhikary =

Indian cricket commentator, journalist, and author

Bijoy Chandra "Berry" Sarbadhikary (died 19 December 1976 at the age of 72 in Bombay) was an Indian cricket commentator, journalist and author.

Berry Sarbadhikary was an opening batsman and wicket-keeper for Calcutta University before taking up journalism. He covered 104 Test matches over about fifty years. He was a commentator in All India Radio till 1972.

He got the nickname 'Berry' after, on finding a player short in a match, he entered the name "John Berry" (first names of Jack Hobbs) as the last man and eventually played in that place. He was the son of Sushil Prasad and had one child, Jayashree Sarbadhikary Roy.

Sarbadhikary committed suicide by jumping from the third floor of the boarding house in Crawford Market, Bombay (now Mumbai) where he lived. The suicide note that he left mentioned ill health and financial insecurities as the reasons.

Major works

- C.K. Nayudu (1945)
- Indian Cricket Uncovered (1945)
- My World of Cricket (1964)

== See also ==
- Sarbadhikari
