= Pradhan (film) =

2023 Indian Bengali film by Avijit Sen

- Pradhan Movie Poster
- Directed by: Avijit Sen
- Written by: Subhadeep Das
- Screenplay by: Shubhadeep Das
- Story by: Atanu Ray Chaudhuri; Avijit Sen
- Produced by: Dev; Atanu Raychaudhuri; Pranab Kumar Guha
- Starring: Dev; Soham Chakraborty; Paran Bandyopadhyay; Soumitrisha Kundu; Anirban Chakrabarti; Mamata Shankar; Sabitri Chatterjee
- Cinematography: Gopi Bhagat
- Edited by: Sujoy Dutta Roy
- Music by: Shantanu Moitra; Anupam Roy; Rathijit Bhattacharjee
- Production companies: Bengal Talkies; Dev Entertainment Ventures
- Distributed by: PVR Inox Pictures
- Release date: 22 December 2023
- Running time: 162:36 minutes
- Country: India
- Language: Bengali
- Box office: ₹7 crore

Pradhan is a 2023 Indian Bengali-language political satire action drama film co-written and directed by Avijit Sen. Produced by Dev, Atanu Raychaudhuri and Pranab Kumar Guha under the banners of Dev Entertainment Ventures and Bengal Talkies respectively, the film stars Dev, Anirban Chakrabarti, Paran Bandyopadhyay, Soham Chakraborty and Soumitrisha Kundu in the lead roles. The action sequences in this film are designed by Aejaz Gulab. This film marks the third collaboration between Sen and Dev after the blockbusters Tonic and Projapoti.

The film marked the big - screen debut of Mithai fame Soumitrisha Kundu. It was released on 22 December 2023, on the occasion of Christmas weekend. It became a blockbuster at the box office running for 125 days in the cinema halls, thus making it the third consecutive box-office success for Dev and Avijit Sen duo. The film got its digital premiere on 9 August 2024 on Hoichoi. The film got its World TV Premier on 22 September 2024 on Zee Bangla.

== Plot ==
Newly married police officer Deepak Pradhan is transferred to Dharmapur, a remote village in North Bengal, on election duty. Upon reaching the place, he learns that the village panchayat is being headed by local strongman Jatileshwar Mukherjee for the last fifteen years. He forcefully prevents any opponent to file nomination against him, and as such, he gets elected unopposed every time. Deepak is tasked with conducting free and fair elections this time.

Upon inspecting, Deepak finds that every aspect of the village from the local school to the local police station is filled with corruption, all ultimately leading to Jatileshwar. Even his junior officers are on his payroll. The commoners of the village have been impoverished under Jatileshwar's dictatorship.

Deepak learns that his landlord Jiban Krishna Sarkar was the former headmaster of the village school. He was wrongly framed of theft by Jatileshwar when he raised his voice against his misdeeds. Deepak, along with his fellow villagers, inspire Jiban to file his nomination against Jatileshwar in the upcoming panchayat elections.

Jatileshwar and his goons try to rig the election by every possible means. On the other hand, Deepak and his juniors, now transformed under his leadership, try their level best to conduct a peaceful election. In their effort, Deepak's loyal assistant Bibek loses his life in riots. On the day of counting, Jiban wins the election by a margin of one vote, much to the happiness of the villagers. In the end, Jatileshwar gets arrested for his crimes.

== Cast ==
- Dev as Deepak Pradhan, Inspector-in-charge at Dharmapur Police Station
- Paran Bandyopadhyay as Jiban Krishna Sarkar, a retired teacher, later Panchayat Pradhan of Dharmapur
- Mamata Shankar as Shanti Sarkar, Jiban Krishna's wife
- Sabitri Chatterjee as Deepak's grandmother
- Soumitrisha Kundu as Rumi Pradhan, Deepak's wife
- Soham Chakraborty as Bibek Ray, sub-inspector at Dharmapur Police Station
- Anirban Chakrabarti as Jatileshwar Mukherjee, a politician and head of Dharmapur village council
- Kharaj Mukherjee as opposition leader and local cow milk seller of Dharmapur
- Ambarish Bhattacharya as Pradip, a tenant of Jiban Krishna
- Kanchan Mullick as Ratan, a primary school teacher
- Koneenica Banerjee as Shikha, Pradip's wife
- Sohini Sengupta as Joba Mukherjee, Jatileshwar's wife
- Biswanath Basu as Jatileshwar's Bahubali Party worker
- Ananya Banerjee as Anuradha Sen, superintendent of police of Jalpaiguri and Deepak's superior
- Sneha Basu as Jiban's son's girlfriend
- Arindol Bagchi as vote counting officer
- Sujan Mukherjee as Sub-Inspector Nilmoni Dutta
- Debasish Mondal as Jatileshwar's Bahubali Party worker
- Rupsha Chakraborty as Bibek's wife
- Biswajit Ghosh Majumdar as Jatileshwar's nephew
- Biswajit Chakraborty as Deepak's father
- Tulika Basu as Deepak's mother
- John Bhattacharya as Jiban's son
- Debnath Chatterjee as Returning officer

== Production ==
=== Development ===
Dev took to his social media handles to announce the film on 15 April 2023. The shooting was started from 25 August 2023. Both Dev and Soham went through huge physical transformation with cupping therapy and gym to lose weight for their roles in the film. On 10 November Dev announced wrap for the film.

=== Filming ===
The principal photography took place in Chalsa, Dooars, Samsing, Rocky Island, Mondol Gaon, Ranichera in North Bengal and Kolkata. During the shooting Dev fell ill and succumbed to high fever, but he recovered soon.

=== Marketing ===
An announcement poster was released on 25 August 2023 to mark the beginning of filming. On 10 November 2023, the first poster was released at a press conference at Nandan. The trailer was released on 4 December 2023.

== Release ==
=== Theatrical ===
The film was released in the theatres on 22 December 2023 on the occasion of Christmas weekend.

=== Home media ===
The film was released on the OTT platform Hoichoi on 9 August 2024.

== Reception ==
=== Box office ===
Pradhan grossed approximately ₹1.50 Crore within first five days of release. According to the film trade magazine Film Information, the film collected over ₹60 Lakhs from national multiplex chains only in West Bengal in its first week of theatrical run. At the end of 3rd week, the total Box Office of the film amounts to ₹4.19 Crore.

=== Critical reception ===
The film received positive reviews from critics. The Telegraph India reviewed the film and wrote "Although the three-hour runtime makes it too long, the breathtaking cinematography, brilliant acting and well-placed songs elevates the film." Santanu Das of Hindustan Times wrote "The movie depicts the bitter reality of today's political and social scenario with a directorial infusion of surprise and intrigue. Although the film gets depictable, the cast has presented a commendable performance." Shamayita Chakraborty of OTTPlay reviewed the film and wrote "Pradhan is a perfect example of a Bengali commercial film that are not made today. It has Bengali sensibilities juxtaposed with high-octane drama." Sangbad Pratidin reviewed the film and praised the "acting of the cast and the directorial mettle."

Souvik Saha of CineKolkata rated the film 3.5 out of 5 stars and wrote "It provides a Bengali film with strong performances, effective direction and a gripping narrative. Despite some drawbacks like the length and weak comedy, overall it puts a positive impact." Virat Verma of Flickonclick rated the film 4 out of 5 stars and wrote "The film delivers a thought provoking message while keeping the audience engaged with its well-paced plot and strong performances."

== Awards ==
- Most Popular Film - 7th WBFJA Award, 2024
- Most Popular Actor - Dev - 7th WBFJA Award, 2024
