= Hiralal Sen =

Bengali filmmaker and photographer (1868–1917)

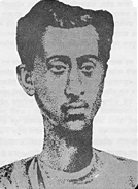
- Hiralal Sen, c. 1900
- Born: 2 August 1868; Manikganj, Bengal Presidency, British India (present day Bangladesh)
- Died: 26 October 1917 (aged 49); Calcutta, Bengal Presidency, British India
- Occupations: Photographer, filmmaker
- Spouse: Hemangini Devi
- Parents: Chandramohan Sen (father); Bidhumukhi Sen (mother)

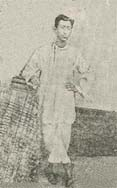
Hiralal Sen, performing the Flower of Persia at the Star Theatre, Kolkata.

Hiralal Sen (Bengali: হীরালাল সেন, Hiralal Shen; 2 August 1868 – 26 October 1917) is generally considered one of India's first filmmakers. In 1903, he filmed the popular Alibaba and Forty Thieves, the first full-length Indian film. A noted photographer, he is also credited with creating India's first advertising films and quite possibly India's first political film. A fire in 1917 destroyed all of his films.

== Early life ==
Hiralal Sen's native home was in Bagjuri, a village in Manikganj, approximately 80 km from Dhaka, the present-day capital of Bangladesh. Although he was the son of a successful lawyer of a Baidya zamindar family of that region, he grew up in Calcutta. In 1898, a film troupe en route to Paris screened a certain Professor Stevenson's short film along with the stage show, The Flower of Persia at the Star Theatre in Calcutta. Borrowing Stevenson's camera, Sen made his first film, "A Dancing Scene" from the opera The Flower of Persia. With assistance from his brother, Motilal Sen, he bought an Urban Bioscope from Charles Urban's Warwick Trading Company in London. In the following year, with his brother, he formed the Royal Bioscope company.

== Filmmaking career ==
In 1898, Hiralal was in Kolkata star Theatre, West Bengal (earlier known as Calcutta)and was watching "flower of Persia". That theatre play had interval were some short film was played and that was the moment he had an idea. He borrowed a camera from the plays director and recorded the whole Flower of Persia play. Furthermore, with added funds by his father he got his first cinematograph camera, and started India's first movie enterprise named - "Royal Bioscope film company" in 1898 itself. In a creative career that extended up to 1913, Hiralal Sen made over forty short films. Most of the films he made depicted scenes from theatrical productions played at Amarendra Dutta's Classic Theatre in Calcutta. At that time raw film was imported into the country. Between 1901 and 1904, he produced many films for Classic Theatre including Bhramar, Hariraj, and Buddhadev. His longest film, produced in 1903 and titled Alibaba and the Forty Thieves, was also based on an original Classic Theatre performance. However, not much is known about this feature film since it was never screened. He also produced a number of advertising films and newsfilms taking commissions. Having made two films advertising Jabakusum Hair Oil and Edwards Tonic, he became the first Indian to use film for advertising purposes.

In 1905, Sen advertised a "genuine Swadeshi film of our own make". Documenting the "Anti-Partition Demonstration and Swadeshi movement at the Town Hall, Calcutta, on the 22nd September 1905", it is, according to critic Samik Bandyopadhyay, India's first political film.

Royal Bioscope made its last film in 1913.

== Filmography ==
Year	Title
1903	Alibaba and the Forty Thieves
between 1901 and 1904	Bhramar
between 1901 and 1904	Hariraj
between 1901 and 1904	Buddhadev
1905	Anti-Partition Demonstration and Swadeshi movement at the Town Hall, Calcutta, on the 22nd September 1905

== Later years ==
Hiralal Sen's later years were filled with disappointment and economic hardship. Jamshedji Framji Madan of the Elphinstone Bioscope Company had long surpassed him in terms of success. To compound his misery, he was also suffering from cancer. A few days before his death in 1917, a fire broke out destroying every film he ever made.

== In popular culture ==
In 2021, a film named Hiralal was made on his life starring Kinjal Nanda.
