= Nagendra Prasad Sarbadhikari =

Known for introducing football in India

- নাগেন্দ্র প্রসাদ সর্বাধিকারী
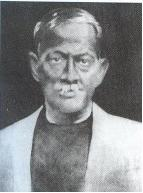
- Born: 27 August 1869; Calcutta, Bengal Presidency, British India (present-day Kolkata, West Bengal, India)
- Died: 17 January 1940 (aged 70)
- Other name: Father Of Indian Football
- Education: Hare School

Nagendra Prasad Sarbadhikary (also Sarbadhikari; Bengali: নাগেন্দ্র প্রসাদ সর্বাধিকারী (বসু); 1869–1940) was an Indian educationist, sports administrator and football pioneer. He is widely regarded as the "Father of Indian Football" for his role in founding the first Indian football organisations after introducing the sport to his classmates at Hare School.

== Early life and family ==
Sarbadhikari was born on 27 August 1869 in Calcutta (now Kolkata, West Bengal), India into the renowned Sarbadhikari family, Kulin Kayastha (Bose) family originally hailing from Radhanagar (Khanakul) situated in Hooghly district. His father was Brigadier, Rai Bahadur Dr. Surya Kumar Sarbadhikari (1832–1904), a surgeon who served during the Sepoy Mutiny or Indian Rebellion of 1857 against the rule of the East India Company.

The Sarbadhikari family was founded during the early 15th century by Sureshwar Bosu of Choa ("Choa" is a village situated in Murshidabad district of present-day West Bengal), who was appointed Governor of Orissa province with the hereditary title of "Sarbadhikari" by the Imperial Court of Delhi.

He had 7 brothers and 2 sisters. Of the brothers, the names of Sir Deb Prasad Sarbadhikari who became Vice Chancellor of the University of Calcutta (1914–1918), and Suresh Prasad Sarbadhikari (1866–1921), an eminent surgeon of British India who organized the Bengal Ambulance Corps to serve in the Mesopotamia War during World War I, and managed the Carmichael Medical College & Hospital, Calcutta (now R.G. Kar Medical College & Hospital) with Dr. Radha Gobinda Kar can be mentioned.

He was married to princess Krishnakamalini, daughter of Raja Ananda Krishna Deb, belonging to the Sovabazar Raj family.

== Works and activities ==
It was Nagendra Prasad who taught the game to his classmates at the Hare School compound in 1877, after he observed British soldiers playing the game in the ground of Calcutta FC while he's paasing near by road in a horse chariot. He then convinced his friends about the game and bought a ball from Messrs Manton & Co. in Bowbazar, and was later assisted and guided by professor of the Presidency College, G. A. Stack. Thus, attracted by the enthusiasm of the boys, the European teachers of the school and adjacent colleges encouraged Nagendra Prasad and his companions to promote the game among other students in and around Calcutta. The very next day Nagendra and his friends started playing football on school premises. The Boys' Club, founded by Nagendra Prasad in 1880, along with his royal friend Nagendra Mullick around this time, was the first Indian initiative to create a football organization.

Later, he formed a string of sporting clubs in Calcutta in the 1880s, one of the first being the Wellington Club in 1884. Wellington Club was formed as merger of all three of his own clubs: Boys Club, Friends Club, and Presidency Club. India's first football coach Dukhiram Majumder also played for his club. Moni Das was one of the first members to be inducted by Nagendra Prasad to the Wellington Club, but the other members of the club protested about playing with this man as he was from the lower caste. Sarbadhikary said that a sporting ground is beyond any prejudice, but after the members' continued protest, he chose to dismantle the Wellington Club. Soon after, 500 members left and Nagendra Prasad founded the Sovabazar Club in 1887, which would become one of the leading sports institutions of colonial India. The club was later patronized by both the Shobhabazar Raj and Cooch Behar State, and participated in tournaments like Trades Cup. The first member of this new club was Moni Das. Das later captained the Mohun Bagan AC, yet another legendary institution of sports in India, in colonial and post-colonial era. Sarbadhikari's close friend Kalicharan Mittir (also 'Mitra') later captained as well as became an official of Sovabazar Club. Thus a man from the lower caste, through footballing process and sport broke into the upper echelons of the Hindu society. He also founded the Howrah Sporting Club in Howrah in association with Bama Charan Kundu.

In 1892, his team Sovabazar emerged as the first Indian side to win a match against a British team, when they defeated the East Surrey Regiment with the score of 2–1 in the opening match of 1892 Trades Cup. The club thus became the first Indian team to win a match in Trades Cup. They again (then managed by Manmatha Ganguly) defeated a British side Shibpur Engineering College on 11 August 1900 at their home ground. His proposals to both the British representatives and club officials of Calcutta for arranging tournaments in organized manner, was one of the driving forces behind the foundation of Indian Football Association (IFA) in 1892. His Sovabazar Club later won Asanullah Cup in Decca in 1916, beating star-studded Mohun Bagan in final.

Sarbadhikari's contributions to the game during the age of associations in Bengal in late 19th century, influenced others like Dukhiram Majumder, Haridas Seal, Manmatha Ganguly involving in football and popularizing it among the masses.

== In popular culture ==
Based on Sarbadhikari's life, a Bengali biographical film titled Golondaaj (Goal is the target), directed by Dhrubo Banerjee and produced by Shree Venkatesh Films, was released on October 10, 2021, in which Bengali actor Dev appeared in the lead role of The Father Of Indian Football. The football league LaLiga shared a poster of Golandaaj featuring Robert Lewandowski honoring the legend.

== See also ==
- Football in India
- History of Indian football
- Football in Kolkata

== Bibliography ==
- Majumdar, Boria; Mangan, J. A. (13 September 2013). Sport in South Asian Society: Past and Present. Oxford: Routledge. p. 117. ISBN 978-1-317-99894-5. Archived from the original on 3 November 2023.
- Mitra, Soumen (1 January 2006). In Search of an Identity: The History of Football in Colonial Calcutta. Kolkata: Dasgupta & Co. Private Ltd. ISBN 978-8182110229. Archived from the original on 21 October 2022.
- Roselli, John. Self Image of Effeteness: Physical Education and Nationalism in Nineteenth Century Bengal. Past & Present (journal). 86 (February 1980). p. 121–48.
- Sinha, Mrinalini. Colonial Masculinity, The Manly Englishman and the Effeminate Bengali in the Late Nineteenth Century (Manchester: Manchester University Press, 1995).
- Majumdar, Boria; Bandyopadhyay, Kausik (2006). A Social History Of Indian Football: Striving To Score. Routledge. ISBN 9780415348355. Archived from the original on 29 June 2021.
- Kausik Bandyopadhyay (29 November 2020). Scoring Off the Field: Football Culture in Bengal, 1911–80. Taylor & Francis. ISBN 9781000084054. Archived from the original on 7 March 2023.
- "Regionalism and club domination: Growth of rival centres of footballing excellence". Soccer & Society. 6:2–3 (2–3). Taylor & Francis: 227–256. 6 August 2006. doi:10.1080/14660970500106410. S2CID 216862171. Archived from the original on 1 March 2023.
- Basu, Jaydeep (2003). Stories from Indian Football. UBS Publishers' Distributors. ISBN 9788174764546. Archived from the original on 11 October 2022.
- Bolsmann, Chris; Vahed, Goolam (2 November 2017). "'They Are Fine Specimens of the Illustrious Indian Settler': Sporting Contact between India and South Africa, 1914–1955". Journal of Southern African Studies. 43 (6): 1273–1291. doi:10.1080/03057070.2017.1379689. ISSN 0305-7070. S2CID 148862123. Archived from the original on 3 October 2022.
- Pillai, Manu S (8 June 2018). "How football kicked off in India". lifestyle.livemint.com. Delhi, India: Livemint Delhi. Archived from the original on 14 July 2022.
- Chatterjee, Partha. The Nation and Its Fragments: Colonial and Post-colonial Histories (Calcutta: Oxford University Press, 1995).
- Nath, Nirmal (2011). History of Indian Football: Upto 2009–10. Readers Service. ISBN 9788187891963. Archived from the original on 22 July 2022.
- Kapadia, Novy (2017). Barefoot to Boots: The Many Lives of Indian Football. Penguin Random House. ISBN 978-0-143-42641-7.
- Martinez, Dolores; Mukharjiim, Projit B (2009). Football: From England to the World: The Many Lives of Indian Football. Routledge. ISBN 978-1-138-88353-6. Archived from the original on 2 July 2022.
- Dineo, Paul; Mills, James (2001). Soccer in South Asia: Empire, Nation, Diaspora. London, United Kingdom: Frank Cass Publishers. ISBN 978-0-7146-8170-2. Archived from the original on 25 July 2022.
- "Triumphs and Disasters: The Story of Indian Football, 1889—2000" (PDF). Archived from the original (PDF) on 13 August 2012.
- D'Mello, Anthony (1959). Portrait Of Indian Sport. P R Macmillan Limited, London.
- From recreation to competition: Early history of Indian football. pp. 124–141. Published online: 6 Aug 2006. www.tandfonline.com. Retrieved 30 June 2021.
- Sengupta, Somnath (29 July 2011). "Tactical Evolution Of Indian Football (Part One): Profiling Three Great 2-3-5 Teams". thehardtackle.com. Kolkata: The Hard Tackle. Archived from the original on 9 October 2021.
- Sen, Dwaipayan (2013). "Wiping the Stain Off the Field of Plassey: Mohun Bagan in 1911". In Bandyopadhyay, Kausik; Mallick, Sabyasachi (eds.). Fringe Nations in World Soccer. Routledge. ISBN 978-1-317-99810-5.
- Sen, Ronojoy (2015). "The Empire Strikes Back: The 1911 IFA Shield and Football in Calcutta". Nation at Play: A History of Sport in India. Columbia University Press. ISBN 978-0-231-16490-0.
