= ESys Technologies =

eSys Global
- Type: Public
- Industry: Consumer electronics
- Founded: Singapore
- Founder: Vikas Goel
- Headquarters: Singapore, Sri Lanka
- Area served: Worldwide

eSys Technologies is a distributor of Internet technology components. and by 2011 had more than 300 employees. It is a subsidiary of EZY Infotech Pte Ltd and in 2007 had $1.7 billion in annual revenues.

== History ==
eSys Technologies was founded by Vikas Goel in 2000 who serves as chairman and CEO. In 2005 the company's sales were almost $2 billion and they had established 112 offices across 33 countries.

Later the company partnered with Seagate Technology for product distribution in the US, Canada and Latin America. At that time, eSys covered 25 countries in Europe, Asia, Americas and Australia via a network of subsidiaries. However, in 2006 Seagate Technology ended its distributorship relationship with eSys Technologies after it denied Seagate Technologies the right to conduct a third party audit of its accounts. According to Seagate Technologies' 2006 third quarter financial filings, eSys Technologies owed them $50 million in distributorship fees, at that time. That same month eSys Technologies announced a global distribution agreement with Samsung and reported to have 117 offices in 38 countries.

By 2007 the company had established four manufacturing facilities to produce its own retail products. It maintained distribution hubs in Singapore, New Delhi, Dubai, Los Angeles and Amsterdam and had $1.7 billion in annual revenues. In 2011 eSys became the exclusive distributor of products manufactured by Transcend Incorporated.

The company is a subsidiary of EZY Infotech Pte Ltd. which has headquarters in Singapore plus branches in Australia, Bangladesh, India, Canada, Hong Kong, China, Croatia, Japan, Korea, Malaysia and Latin America.
