= Ekannoborti =

- Theatrical poster
- Directed by: Mainak Bhaumik
- Written by: Mainak Bhaumik; Aritra Sengupta
- Produced by: Shrikant Mohta; Mahendra Soni
- Starring: Aparajita Adhya; Sauraseni Maitra; Alokananda Roy
- Cinematography: Prosenjit Chowdhury
- Edited by: Sumit Chowdhury
- Music by: Savvy
- Production company: Shree Venkatesh Films
- Distributed by: Shree Venkatesh Films
- Release date: 19 November 2021
- Country: India
- Language: Bengali

Ekannoborti (transl. joint family) is 2021 Indian Bengali-language drama film co-written and directed by Mainak Bhaumik. It is produced by Shrikant Mohta and Mahendra Soni under the banner of Shree Venkatesh Films. It stars Aparajita Adhya, Sauraseni Maitra, Ananya Sen and Alakananda Ray. The film had a theatrical release on 19 November 2021.

== Cast ==
- Aparajita Adhya as Malini Chatterjee: Sujan's Wife, Shila and Pinky's mother
- Sauraseni Maitra as Shila Chatterjee: Sujan and Malini's elder daughter, Pinky's elder sister
- Ananya Sen as Pinky Chatterjee: Sujan and Malini's younger daughter, Shila's younger sister
- Alakananda Ray as Malini's mother, Shila and Pinky's grandmother
- Kaushik Sen as Abhradeep Dutta: director of web series
- Sandipta Sen
- Gourab Roychoudhury as Animesh: Shila's childhood friend and her ex-boyfriend in school
- Ravi Shaw as Sunny : Shila's fiancé
- Sudip Mukherjee as Sujan Chatterjee: Malini's husband, Shila and Pinky's father
- Madhurima Ghosh as Jhumpa

== Soundtrack ==
Track listing
No.	Title	Singer(s)	Length
1.	"Behaya"	Lagnajita Chakraborty	3:42
Total length:			3:42
