= Binisutoy =

Bengali drama film

Binisutoy: Without Strings
- Poster
- বিনিসুতোয়
- Directed by: Atanu Ghosh
- Written by: Atanu Ghosh
- Starring: Ritwick Chakraborty; Jaya Ahsan
- Cinematography: Appu Prabhakar
- Edited by: Sujay Datta Ray
- Music by: Debojyoti Mishra
- Production company: Echo Entertainments
- Release date: 21 August 2021
- Country: India
- Language: Bengali

Binisutoy (transl. No String Attached) is a Bengali drama film directed by Atanu Ghosh and produced by Sandeep Agarwal. Released on 20 August 2021, it stars Ritwick Chakraborty and Bangladesh actress Jaya Ahsan.

== Plot ==
Kajal and Sraboni, two people in their mid thirties, meet at a reality game show audition. Common background helps them in striking up a quick bond. A freak accident injures Sraboni and Kajal takes her to the doctor. On the way, they share two engrossing stories from their lives. The captivating human drama culminates in an ironic altercation between them.

== Cast ==
- Ritwick Chakraborty as Kajal
- Jaya Ahsan as Sraboni
- Chandrayee Ghosh as Jenny
- Samontak Dyuti Maitra as Kaahon
- Koushik Sen as Cousin brother

== Awards ==
- Kerala International Film Festival
- Madrid Film Festival
- Aurangabad International Film
- Toulouse Indian Film Festival

== Review ==
The Indian Express- Atanu Ghosh's film targets the loneliness within
Cinestaan- Engaging drama explains how stories make life meaningful
Asian movie pulse-
Popcorn - Binisutoy is a complex and a nuanced drama that is so brilliant that it communicates to you on a totally different level.
Binged- A Sharp Yet Unique Look Into Loneliness The Daily Eye- Atanu Ghosh's new film weaves a delightful tapestry that defies genre pigeonholing
Report Wire - Atanu Ghosh's movie targets the loneliness inside
Sangbad Pratidin- This film of the Ritwick-Jaya duo illustrates the difference between dreams and reality.
Henry Clubs- Atanu Ghosh's film targets inner loneliness
News Today- Atanu Ghosh's Binisutoy An affecting film with a troubling gaze
