= Dictionary (film) =

2021 Indian Bengali film

- Theatrical release poster
- Directed by: Bratya Basu
- Screenplay by: Ujjwal Chattopadhyay; Bratya Basu
- Based on: Baba Hoya and Swami Hoya by Buddhadeb Guha
- Produced by: Firdausul Hasan; Prabal Halder
- Starring: Abir Chatterjee; Nusrat Jahan; Mosharraf Karim; Arna Mukherjee; Madhurima Basak; Poulomi Basu
- Cinematography: Sirsha Ray
- Edited by: Anirban Maity
- Music by: Prabuddha Banerjee
- Production company: Friends Communication
- Distributed by: SSR Cinemas Pvt. Ltd.
- Release date: 12 February 2021
- Running time: 108 minutes
- Country: India
- Language: Bengali

Dictionary is an Indian Bengali-language drama film directed by Bratya Basu and produced by Firdausul Hasan and Prabal Halder. The music is composed by Prabuddha Banerjee. The storyline of the film is based on the story, Baba Hoya and Swami Hoya, by Buddhadeb Guha The film was theatrically released on 12 February 2021.

== Plot ==
Makar Kanti Chatterjee (Mosharraf) is a semi-educated self-made businessman who tries hard but often fails to communicate in English. On the other hand, his brother-in-law Suman (Arna) gets romantically involved with a woman (Nusrat) married to an introverted forest officer, Ashoke Sanyal (Abir). These two interconnected yet distinct stories form the crux of the film.

== Cast ==
- Abir Chatterjee as Ashoke Sanyal
- Nusrat Jahan as Smita Sanyal
- Mosharraf Karim as Makar Kranti Chatterjee
- Arna Mukherjee as Suman
- Madhurima Basak as Nabanita
- Sagnik Chowdhury as Rakesh
- Poulomi Basu as Sreemati Chatterjee

== Release ==
The film was released by SSR Cinemas Pvt. Ltd. on 12 February 2021.

== Award ==
- Gautam Buddha Award for Best Feature Film in the Nepal International Film Festival.
