= Tonic (film) =

2021 Indian Bengali film by Avijit Sen

- Tonic latest poster
- Directed by: Avijit Sen
- Produced by: Atanu Raychaudhuri; Pranab Kumar Guha
- Starring: Dev; Paran Bandopadhyay; Shakuntala Barua; Tanusree Chakraborty
- Cinematography: Supriyo Dutta
- Edited by: Sujay Datta Ray
- Music by: Jeet Gannguli; Raja Narayan Deb
- Production companies: Bengal Talkies & Dev Entertainment Ventures
- Distributed by: Bengal Talkies
- Release date: 24 December 2021
- Running time: 133:58 minutes
- Country: India
- Language: Bengali
- Box office: ₹7 Cr approx

Tonic is a 2021 Indian Bengali-language adventure drama film directed by Avijit Sen, produced by Atanu Raychaudhuri and distributed jointly by Bengal Talkies and Dev Entertainment Ventures. The film revolves around an elderly couple, portrayed by Paran Bandopadhyay and Shakuntala Barua, who get to enjoy a fresh lease of life through their tourist guide, Tonic (Dev).

Tonic marked the directorial debut of Avijit Sen, who had previously worked as an assistant director to Rajkumar Hirani. He also wrote the story of the film, which he completed in a year by taking cues from his own life. Supriyo Dutta is the cinematographer for the film, while Sujay Datta Ray is the editor. It was jointly distributed by Bengal Talkies and Dev Entertainment Ventures.

Upon its premiere on 2 December 2021, Tonic opened to positive reviews and became a huge commercial success, eventually becoming the highest-grossing Bengali film of 2021. The chemistry between Dev and Paran Bandopadhyay won appraisals besides the plot and other elements. It has been the official selection for Indian Panorama (Mainstream Cinema Section) in 53rd International Film Festival of India in Goa.

== Plot ==
Tonic tells us the story of 75-year-old retired man, Jaladhar Sen who lives with his wife, son, daughter-in-law and granddaughter. Their relationship has become sour because of the dominating attitude and over-possessiveness of their son. The story revolves around the old couple's problems as a result of their son's misbehaviour and the problems intensify when their son and daughter-in-law celebrate their own marriage anniversary in a grand way but the 46th marriage anniversary celebration of the old couple is planned to be just a small get-together. The old couple plans a foreign trip and comes across a travel agent named Tonic, who later turns out to be a miracle maker in life. However, the foreign trip is cancelled as the passport of Jaladhar's wife gets rejected because of non-availability of some important documents. Jaladhar rebukes Tonic for shattering all his dreams and taunts him for making false promises. But later, the old couple plans for a secret trip to Darjeeling with Tonic for company. They leave in the middle of the night leaving their son worried about them. Jaladhar and his wife have the time of their lives and enjoy themselves like never before. Jaladhar goes for a lot of adventure sports like rock-climbing, paragliding, river-rafting and other activities. He wins over his fears and relives his lost youth. Later, Tonic celebrates Jaladhar's anniversary in a grand way and reveals to Jaladhar's wife that his parents died when he was settled abroad. So, he decided to help all those old couples who wanted to live their lives to the fullest. Jaladhar suddenly falls sick and is admitted to the hospital. His son arrives soon and threatens to file a police complaint against Tonic. But he changes his mind when he learns how Tonic gave his parents new life. They all decide to take a trip to Paris at the end of the film. The refreshing presence of Tonic brings back happiness, peace and love in the Sen family. Tonic lives up to his name and heals Jaladhar's life. Jaladhar expresses how grateful he is to Tonic for it is because of him that he experienced what fun meant.

== Cast ==
- Dev as Tonic
- Paran Bandopadhyay as Jaladhar Sen
- Shakuntala Barua as Uma Sen: Jaladhar's wife
- Sujan Mukhopadhyay as Partha Sen: Jaladhar's son
- Rajatava Dutta as Police officer
- Biswanath Basu as Gourango: a caterer
- Biswajit Chakraborty as Jaladhar's close friend
- Koneenica Banerjee as Rani Sen: Jaladhar's daughter-in-law
- Tanusree Chakraborty as Ria: Jaladhar's Travel Expert
- Kanchan Mullick as Kalimohan/Jalimohan: fake document creator
- Ambarish Bhattacharya as a local politician
- Tulika Basu as Rani's mother
- B.D Mukherjee as Tonic's late father
- Pinky Mullick as the Sen family's maid
- Sriparna Roy as Neha
- Subha Roy Chowdhury as Abhi: Neha's husband
- Roopkatha Kundu as Rumi: Jaladhar Sen's granddaughter

== Soundtrack ==
Tonic

Soundtrack album by Jeet Gannguli
- Released: 4 December 2021
- Studio: Playhead Studio
- Genre: Feature film soundtrack
- Length: 15:01
- Language: Bengali
- Label: Zee Music Bangla

Jeet Gannguli chronology
Baazi (2021)	Tonic (2021)	Kolkatar Harry (2022)

The soundtrack is composed by Jeet Gannguli and lyrics by Prosen, Srijato and Anindya Chatterjee.

Track listing
No.	Title	Lyrics	Singer(s)	Length
1.	"Tonic -Title Track"	Prosen, Anindya Chatterjee	Anindya Chatterjee, Snigdhajit Bhowmick, Gourab Sarkar, Satish Gajmer And Kinjal Chattopadhyay	3:24
2.	"Aaynate"	Prosen, Avijit Sen	Anupam Roy	2:51
3.	"E Mon Eka(Female)"	Srijato	Shreya Ghoshal	4:23
4.	"E Mon Eka(Male)"	Srijato	Nachiketa Chakraborty	4:23
Total length:				15:01

== Release ==
=== Theatrical ===
The film was released in the theatres on 24 December 2021.

=== Home media ===
The film had its digital premiere on 18 February 2022 on Zee5.

== Awards ==
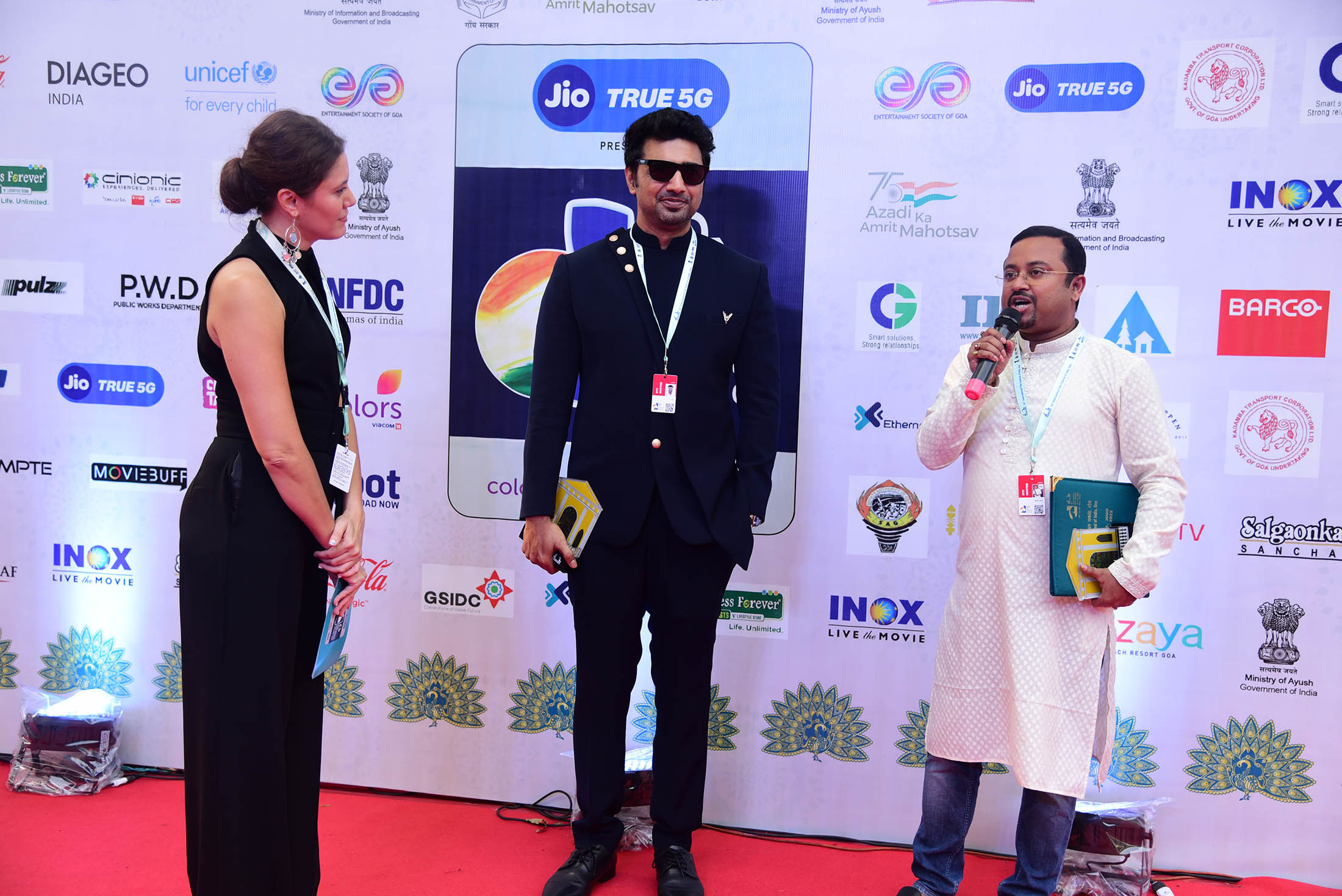
The Director, Avijit Sen and Actor Dev of Indian Panorama Bengali Feature film ‘Tonic’ at the red carpet at 53rd International Film Festival of India (IFFI), in Goa on November 26, 2022.

At the 5th Filmfare Awards Bangla, the film received six leading nominations and won three, including Best Film, Best Actor (Bandopadhyay) and Best Debut Director (Sen).
