= Ambarish Bhattacharya =

Indian Bengali actor

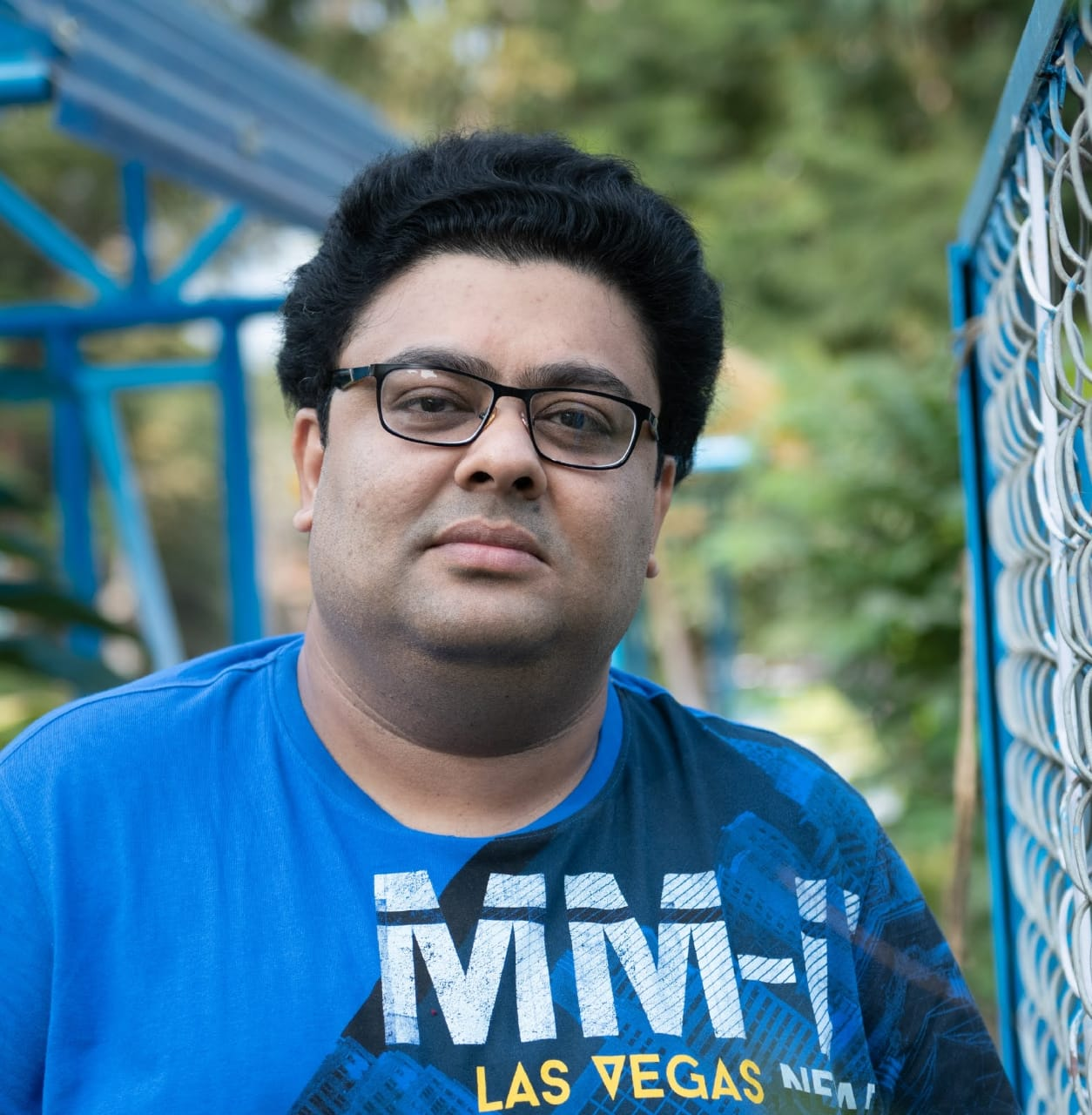
- Bhattacharya in 2021
- Born: 13 March 1979 (age 47); Kolkata, India
- Citizenship: Indian
- Occupation: Actor
- Known for: Gaja in Raja & Gaja
- Notable work: Raja & Gaja (2007 - 2010); Open Tee Bioscope (2015); Khorkuto (2020-2022)

Ambarish Bhattacharya (born 13 March 1979) is an Indian actor and comedian who works primarily in Bengali theatre, television and cinema. Based in Kolkata, he began his career in theatre before moving to television.

Bhattacharya made his television debut in 2007 as Gaja in Raja & Gaja. He made his film debut with Open Tee Bioscope in 2015, directed by Anindya Chatterjee, and later appeared in films including Baje Chobi (2017), Kabir (2018), Bhagshesh (2018), Shantilal O Projapoti Rohoshyo (2019), The Parcel (2020) and Durgo Rahasya (2023).

For his role in Ardhangini (2023), Bhattacharya received the Filmfare Award for Best Actor in a Supporting Role (Male) and the Tolly Cine Samman for Best Supporting Actor in 2024. He was also nominated for Best Supporting Actor at the Critics' Choice Film Awards, India.

== Career ==
Ambarish forayed into Bengali television with his debut fiction comedy series Raja & Gaja. He began working in films from 2011 with minor roles. He has already worked with directors like Kaushik Ganguly, Anjan Dutt, Srijit Mukherji, Kamaleswar Mukherjee, and others. Open Tee Bioscope by Anindya Chattopadhyay, Bibaho Obhijaan by Birsa Dasgupta and Gotro by Sibaprasad Mukherji and Nandita Roy are some of works with major roles. Beside these, he has also been active in sharing screens in TV commercials.

=== Theatre ===
Ambarish started working with theatre groups from early 2000. He was closely involved in performing theatre songs along with veteran thespian and singer Ketaki Dutta. After some time he also started acting in theater groups. He has also worked in Jatra (theatre) with the famous female impersonator Chapal Bhaduri in Shitala from 2000 to 2006. Some of his works includes Ferari Fouj (2005) under Sanglap Kolkata; Puratani Natoker Gaan (songs compilation) (2006) and Kanu Kohe Raai (2010) under Sansriti group and Nisanga Samrat (2013) under Indraranga group.

== Filmography and television ==
=== Television ===
Year	Title	Role	Language	Channel	Ref.
2007-2010	Raja & Gaja	Gaja	Bengali	Zee Bangla	
2012 - 2013	Saat Paake Bandha	Bubai	Bengali	Zee Bangla	
2012	Aparajito		Bengali	Zee Bangla	
2012	Kolir Gopal		Bengali	Zee Bangla	
2012	Joto Hashi Toto Ranna		Bengali	Zee Bangla	
2013	Raage Anuraage	Prashanta Banerjee	Bengali	Zee Bangla	
2013 - 2014	Boyei Gelo	Mr. Botobyal	Bengali	Zee Bangla	
2014	Bibi Chowdhurani	Manohar Chowdhury	Bengali	Zee Bangla	
2015 - 2016	Goyenda Ginni	Ashish Mitra aka Hablu	Bengali	Zee Bangla	
2015 - 2017	Punyi Pukur	Chandrajit Banerjee	Bengali	Star Jalsha	
2016	Bhootu	School Teacher	Bengali	Zee Bangla	
2016	Mahanayak	Buro	Bengali	Star Jalsha	
2018	Bhajaharir Dhaba	Bhajahari	Bengali	DD Bangla	
2019–2021	Sreemoyee	Pradip Bose aka Dipu	Bengali	Star Jalsha	
2020	Hashiwala & Company	Co-anchor	Bengali	Star Jalsha	
2022	Dhulokona	Dr. Rohit	Bengali	Star Jalsha	
2022	Balijhhor		Bengali	Star Jalsha	
2020–2022	Khorkuto	Kamaleshwar Mukherjee aka Potka	Bengali	Star Jalsha	
2022–2023	Guddi	Debpratim Sen aka Dodul	Bengali	Star Jalsha	
2024–2025	Roshnai	Chotu	Bengali	Star Jalsha	
2025–2026	Chirosokha	-	Bengali	Star Jalsha	
2025–2026	Bhole Baba Par Karega	Kushanjan Bhattacharya	Bengali	Star Jalsha	

=== Filmography ===
Year	Title	Director	Ref.
2015	Open Tee Bioscope	Anindya Chatterjee	
2017	Dekh Kemon Lage	Abhijit Guja & Sudeshna Roy	
2017	Jio Pagla	Ravi Kinagi	
2017	Shob Bhooturey	Birsa Dasgupta	
2017	Cockpit	Kamaleshwar Mukherjee	
2018	Manojder Adbhut Bari	Anindya Chatterjee	
2018	Kabir	Aniket Chattopadhyay	
2018	Bhagshesh		
2018	Hoyto Manush Noy		
2018	Uma	Srijit Mukherjee	
2019	Samsara		
2019	Gotro	Nandita Roy & Shiboprasad Mukherjee	
2019	Shantilal O Projapoti Rohoshyo	Pratim D. Gupta	
2019	Baccha Shoshur	Biswaroop Biswas	
2019	Bibaho Obhijaan	Birsa Dasgupta	
2020	The Parcel		
2020	Detective	Joydeep Mukherjee	
2020	Brahma Janen Gopon Kommoti	Aritra Mukherjee	
2020	Saheber Cutlet	Anjan Dutta	
2020	Switzerland	Sauvik Kundu	
2021	Tonic	Abhijit Sen	
2022	Lokkhi Chele	Kaushik Ganguly	
2022	Projapoti	Abhijit Sen	
2022	Haami 2	Nandita Roy & Shiboprasad Mukherjee	
2022	Toke Chara Bachbona	Sujit Mondal	
2022	Ajker Shortcut	Subir Mondal	
2023	Maayakumari	Arindam Sil	
2023	Kaberi Antardhan	Kaushik Ganguly	
2023	Fatafati	Nandita Roy & Shiboprasad Mukherjee	
2023	Ardhangini	Kaushik Ganguly	
2023	Byomkesh O Durgo Rahasya	Birsa Dasgupta	
2023	Raktabeej	Nandita Roy & Shiboprasad Mukherjee	
2023	Pradhan	Abhijit Sen	
2024	Pariah	Tathagata Mukherjee	
2024	Boomerang	Sauvik Kundu	
2024	Ajogyo	Kaushik Ganguly	
2024	Shastri	Pathikrit Basu	
2024	Jomaloye Jibonto Bhanu	Krishnendu Chatterjee	
2025	Madam Sengupta	Sayantan Ghosal	
2026	Aajo Ardhangini	Kaushik Ganguly	
2026	Sheshbela	Rohan Sen	
2026	Shikor	Bratya Basu	
2026	Projapati 2	Abhijit Sen	
2026	Bohurupi 2	Nandita Roy & Shiboprasad Mukherjee	
Yet To Release	Asukh Bisukh	Kaushik Ganguly	

=== Web series ===
Year	Title	Role	Language	Production	Comments
2023	Kolonko		Bengali	Missing Screw	
2023	Kumudini Bhavan	Inspector	Bengali	Mahabahu Motion Pictures	
2017-2018	Hello (web series)	Ambarish	Bengali	Hoichoi	
2018	Ha Ja Ba Ra La	Co-host (stand-up comedy)	Bengali	Hoichoi	

== Awards ==
Year	Award	Category	Name	Result
2015	West Bengal Tele Academy Awards		Raager Anuraage	Won
2022	West Bengal Tele Academy Awards	Best Actor (Comic role)	Khorkuto	Won
2024	Filmfare Award Bangla	Best Supporting Actor	Ardhangini	Won
2024	West Bengal Govt Bishesh Colochitro Somman			Won
2025	West Bengal Tele Academy Awards	Best Supporting Actor	Roshni	Won
