= Antardhaan =

2021 Indian Bengali drama film

- Directed by: Arindam Bhattacharya
- Written by: Arindam Bhattacharya
- Produced by: Rina Choudhury
- Starring: Parambrata Chatterjee; Tanushree Chakraborty; Mamata Shankar; Rajatava Dutta
- Production company: Dreamliner Entertainment
- Release date: 2021
- Country: India
- Language: Bengali

Antardhaan is a 2021 Indian Bengali-language thriller drama film written and directed by Arindam Bhattacharya. Initially the date of release was fixed on 7 April 2020 but it was released theatrically on 10 December 2021 under the banner of Dreamliner Entertainment. The release was postponed due to the COVID-19 pandemic in India.

== Plot ==
Anirban is a professor who lives in Delhi with his wife Tanu and daughter Zinia. He is transferred to a lonely town named Kasauli. They enjoy a lot in the new city but their neighbors are mysterious. One day their daughter Zinia goes missing during an excursion. Anirban and his wife enquire and come to know that the tour was actually cancelled!

== Cast ==
- Parambrata Chatterjee as Anirban
- Tanushree Chakraborty as Tanu
- Mamata Shankar as Neighbor
- Rajatava Dutta as Niladri Sen, CID officer
- Harsh Chhaya as Neelambar
- Sujan Mukhopadhyay as Hapu
- Mohar Choudhury as Zinia
- Akshay Kapoor as Harjinder Sahni
