= Urban Bioscope =

Movie film projector

The Urban Bioscope, also known as the Warwick Bioscope, was a film projector developed by Walter Isaacs in 1897 for Charles Urban of the Warwick Trading Company. The projector used a beater movement. It has two names because it was created by Charles Urban and Walter Isaacs. It was a 35mm fast-pull-down-beater-movement machine allegedly based on Georges Demenÿ patents. In 1897, Urban joined Warwick Trading in the UK. At that time he brought with him the Bioscope from America for resale. Earlier versions of the scope projected both slides and films. These versions came with a "spoolbank" attachment that made it possible for very short films to be repeated without pause.
