= Golondaaj =

- Theatrical release poster
- Directed by: Dhrubo Banerjee
- Written by: Dhrubo Banerjee; Dulal Dey
- Screenplay by: Dhrubo Banerjee
- Produced by: SVF Entertainment
- Starring: Deepak Adhikari (Dev); Alexx O'Nell; Anirban Bhattacharya; Ishaa Saha; Indrasish Roy; Srikanta Acharya; John Bhattacharya; Mirchi Agni; Joydeep Mukherjee
- Cinematography: Soumik Haldar
- Edited by: Sanglap Bhowmick
- Music by: Bickram Ghosh
- Production company: SVF Entertainment
- Distributed by: SVF Entertainment
- Release date: 10 October 2021
- Running time: 149:58 Minutes
- Country: India
- Language: Bengali
- Budget: ₹6 crore
- Box office: ₹4.18 crore

Golondaaj is a 2021 Indian Bengali-language epic period biographical sports drama film directed by Dhrubo Banerjee and produced by Shrikant Mohta and Mahendra Soni under the banner of SVF. The film stars Dev, Alexx O'Nell, Anirban Bhattacharya, Ishaa Saha, Indrasish Roy, John Bhattacharya, Mirchi Agni and Srikanta Acharya. It is based on the life of Nagendra Prasad Sarbadhikari, who is known as the "Father of Indian football". The film emerged as blockbuster at the box-office. At the 5th Filmfare Awards Bangla, Dhrubo Banerjee won "Best Screenplay" award for Golondaaj.

== Synopsis ==
Based on true events, Golondaaj depicts the journey of Nagendra Prasad Sarbadhikari. Attributed as the "Father of Indian Football", he was the first Indian to play the sport and open a professional football club in the country.

== Cast ==
- Dev as Nagendra Prasad Sarbadhikari
  - Ankit Majumder as young Nagendra Prasad
- Alexx O'Nell as Major Frederick Jackson
- Anirban Bhattacharya as Bhargav Upadhyay
- Ishaa Saha as Kamalini Debi Sarbadhikari, Nagendra's wife
- Indrasish Roy as Captain Jitendra Banerjee
- John Bhattacharya as Binod Bhattacharya
- Srikanta Acharya as Surya Kumar Sarbadhikari
- Joydip Mukherjee as Prasanna Kumar Sarbadhikari
- Padmanabha Dasgupta as Raja Anandakrishna Deb
- Tulika Basu as Nagendra's mother
- Prantik Choudhury as Deshbandhu Chittaranjan Das
- Agnijit Sen (Mirchi Agni) as Narsinghprasad Sen Sharma (Naru)
- Ujaan Chatterjee as Moni Das
- Amitabh Acharya as Suro Das
- Anirban Sikdar as Dukhi Ram
- Biswajit Das as Jotadhari
- Aniruddha Gupta as Cyrus Ittarwala
- Dulal Dey as Purohit
- Debesh Sarkar as Mahidul Islam
- Jakir Hossen as Majid Islam
- Indrajit Mazumdar
- Issac Tirkeh as Akhilesh
- Abhishek Singh as Philip

== Production ==
The list of actors and actresses of the film was released on 25 January 2020 from the Twitter handle of SVF. That list shows that Dev, Anirban Bhattacharya, Ishaa Saha, Indrasish Roy, Srikanta Acharya, John Bhattacharya are acting in the film. A The Times Of India article dated 2 April 2020 subsequently revealed Alexx O'Nell stars as Major Frederick Jackson, antagonist of the film.

It is the third film of director Druvo Banarjee and first time collaboration with Dev.

The shooting for the film began in Kolkata from 5 February 2020. Due to COVID-19 pandemic they had to pause the shooting. The shooting was resumed on 1 December 2020 and wrapped up on 24 February 2021.

== Soundtrack ==
Golondaaj

Soundtrack album by Bickram Ghosh
- Released: September 2021
- Recorded: 2020
- Studio: Bickram Ghosh Studios
- Genre: Film soundtrack
- Length: 32:05
- Label: SVF
- Producer: Bickram Ghosh

Official audio
- Golondaaj - Full Album on YouTube

The background score and the soundtracks are composed by Bickram Ghosh and lyrics are penned by Srijato and Sugato Guha.

Track listing
No.	Title	Lyrics	Music	Singer	Length
1.	"Juddhang Dehi"	Srijato	Bickram Ghosh	Nirmalya Roy and Shovan Ganguly	3:21
2.	"Vande Mataram"	Bankim Chandra Chatterjee		Nirmalya Roy	3:36
3.	"Raasher Gaan"	Srijato	Bickram Ghosh	Shovan Ganguly and Ujjaini Mukherjee	3:25
4.	"Swopnere Din"	Srijato	Bickram Ghosh	Shovan Ganguly
5.	"Je Chilo Aamar"	Rabindranath Tagore	Bickram Ghosh	Shovan Ganguly
6.	"Gobindo Murari"	Srijato	Bickram Ghosh	Iman Chakraborty

== Release ==
The film released theatrically on 10 October 2021 and had its television premiere on Star Jalsha.

== Reception ==
The film received mixed-to-positive reviews from critics who praised the direction, acting performances, and the music but found the screenplay flawed. At Filmfare Awards Bangla 2021, Dhrubo Banerjee won Best Screenplay award for Golondaaj.
