= Gopi Bhagat =

Indian cinematographer

- Occupation: Cinematographer
- Known for: Bengali films
- Notable work: Egaro; Asamapto; Tarikh; Hiralal; 8/12 Binay Badal Dinesh; Kaberi Antardhan

Gopi Bhagat is an Indian cinematographer who primarily works in Bengali films. He collaborated with directors Kaushik Ganguly, Srijit Mukherji, Suman Mukhopadhyay, Nandita Roy and Shiboprosad Mukherjee, Churni Ganguly, Atanu Ghosh and Arun Roy. Some of his works include Egaro, Asamapto, Tarikh, Hiralal, 8/12 Binay Badal Dinesh and Kaberi Antardhan.

== Filmography ==
Denotes films that have not yet been released

Year	Film	Director	Ref
2011	Egaro	Arun Roy	
2011	Rang Milanti	Kaushik Ganguly	
2011	Hello Memsaheb	Nandita Roy & Shiboprosad Mukherjee	
2013	Ami Aar Amar Girlfriends	Mainak Bhaumik	
2013	Antaraal	Benoy Mittra	
2014	Rupkotha Noy	Atanu Ghosh	
2014	Take One	Mainak Bhaumik	
2014	Force	Raja Chanda	
2014	Kolkata Calling	Mainak Bhaumik	
2015	Lorai	Parambrata Chatterjee	
2015	Open Tee Bioscope	Anindya Chatterjee	
2015	Bela Seshe	Nandita Roy & Shiboprosad Mukherjee	
2015	Family Album	Mainak Bhaumik	
2015	Black	Raja Chanda	
2016	Bastu-Shaap	Kaushik Ganguly	
2016	Praktan	Nandita Roy & Shiboprosad Mukherjee	
2016	Chocolate	Sujan Mukhopadhyay	
2016	Cholai	Arun Roy	
2017	Tomake Chai	Rajiv Biswas	
2017	Asamapto	Suman Mukhopadhyay	
2017	Begum Jaan	Srijit Mukherji	
2017	Posto	Nandita Roy & Shiboprosad Mukherjee	
2017	Chawlochitra Circus	Mainak Bhaumik	
2017	Dhaka Attack	Dipankar Dipon	
2018	Golpo Oder	Mainak Bhaumik	
2018	Drishtikone	Kaushik Ganguly	
2018	Kishore Kumar Junior	Kaushik Ganguly	
2018	Girlfriend	Raja Chanda	
2019	Thai Curry	Ankit Aditya	
2019	Tarikh	Churni Ganguly	
2019	Googly	Abhimanyu Mukherjee	
2019	Sotoroi September	Amitabh Bhattacharjee	
2020	Love Story	Rajiv Biswas	
2021	Hiralal	Arun Roy	
2021	Ei Ami Renu	Saumen Sur	
2022	8/12 Binay Badal Dinesh	Arun Roy	
2022	Abbar Kanchanjangha	Rajorshee De	
2022	Kolkatar Harry	Rajdeep Ghosh	
2022	Jaalbandi	Pijush Saha	
2022	Lokkhi Chele	Kaushik Ganguly	
2022	Projapoti	Avijit Sen	
2023	Kaberi Antardhan	Kaushik Ganguly	
2023	Daal Baati Churma	Haranath Chakraborty	
2023	Ardhangini	Kaushik Ganguly	
2023	Bagha Jatin	Arun Roy	
2023	Pradhan	Avijit Sen	
2024	Ajogyo	Kaushik Ganguly	
2024	Shastri	Pathikrit Basu	
2024	Manohar Pandey	Kaushik Ganguly	
2024	Kabaddi Kabaddi	Kaushik Ganguly	
2024	Asukh Bisukh	Kaushik Ganguly	
