= Switzerland (2020 film) =

2020 Indian Bengali film

- Release poster
- Directed by: Sauvik Kundu
- Written by: Sauvik Kundu
- Produced by: Jeet; Gopal Madnani; Amit Jumrani
- Starring: Abir Chatterjee; Rukmini Maitra
- Cinematography: Jayesh Pradhan
- Edited by: Sujay Datta Ray
- Music by: Savvy Gupta
- Production companies: Grassroots Entertainment; Jeetz Filmworks
- Release date: 13 November 2020
- Running time: 138 minutes
- Country: India
- Language: Bengali

Switzerland is a 2020 Indian Bengali-language family drama film written and directed by Souvik Kundu in his directional debut. The film was produced by Jeet, Gopal Madnani and Amit Jumrani under the banner of Jeetz filmworks. The film stars Abir Chatterjee and Rukmini Maitra in lead roles.

== Synopsis ==
A middle-class family tries to save enough money to travel to Switzerland.

== Cast ==
- Abir Chatterjee as Shibu
- Rukmini Maitra as Rumi
- Ambarish Bhattacharya as Khokon
- Biswanath Basu as Arnab
- Buddhadeb Bhattacharjee
- Sumedha Das
- Arun Mukherjee
- Debasish Roy
- Jeet (special appearance)
- Parambrata Chatterjee (special appearance)
