= Projapati =

2022 Indian Bengali film by Avijit Sen

- Projapoti film poster
- Directed by: Avijit Sen
- Produced by: Atanu Raychaudhuri; Pranab Kumar Guha; Dev
- Starring: Mithun Chakraborty; Dev; Mamata Shankar; Koushani Mukherjee; Shweta Bhattacharya; Kharaj Mukherjee
- Cinematography: Gopi Bhagat
- Edited by: Sujay Datta Ray
- Music by: Anupam Roy; Surojit Chatterjee; Rathijit Bhattacharjee
- Production companies: Bengal Talkies; Dev Entertainment Ventures
- Distributed by: SSR Cinemas
- Release date: 23 December 2022
- Running time: 141:42 min
- Country: India
- Language: Bengali
- Box office: ₹13–14 crore

Projapati (transl. Butterfly) is a 2022 Indian Bengali-language family drama film directed by Avijit Sen, produced by Atanu Raychaudhuri (Bengal Talkies), co-produced by Dev and distributed by SSR Cinemas. The film features Dev himself, alongside Mithun Chakraborty, Mamata Shankar, Koushani Mukherjee and Shweta Bhattacharya in lead roles.

The movie was theatrically released on 23 December 2022 and had its digital premiere on the streaming platform ZEE5 on 14 April 2023. It grossed over ₹14 crore and became the highest grossing Indian Bengali film of 2022 and the sixth highest-grossing Indian Bengali film of all time.

== Plot ==
Gour Chakraborty, a widower and a retired government officer, wants his son Joy Chakraborty, a wedding planner to get married. He tries a lot to convince his son to get married. But Joy is very busy with his work and has no time to plan for himself. Meanwhile, Gour's college friend, Kusum meets him suddenly in a temple and finally, they decide to marry. The Film was shot majorly in the Kolkata and some scenes were shot at Varanasi featuring the famous Ganga Arti at Dashaswamedh Ghat the oldest city of temples.

== Cast ==
- Mithun Chakraborty as Gour Chakraborty
- Dev as Joy Chakraborty, Gour's son
- Mamata Shankar as Kusum Sen, Gour's childhood partner
- Koushani Mukherjee as Jayashri Sen, Kusum's daughter
- Shweta Bhattacharya as Mala, Joy's colleague and love interest
- Koneenica Banerjee as Rumi, Gour's daughter, Joy's sister
- Ambarish Bhattacharya as Swapan, Gour's son-in-law
- Kharaj Mukherjee (cameo) as Gour's neighbour and friend
- Biswanath Basu (cameo) as Bishu, Joy's office colleague
- Arijit Bhusan Bagchi as Local Club Member

== Reception ==
A critic from The Times of India wrote that "As holiday releases go, Projapoti brings a lot to the table, be it in terms of cast, story or a family-friendly viewing experience and audiences wouldn't be remiss if they walked into the theatre for this, especially if they’ve ever been Mithun fans". A critic from OTT Play wrote that "Projapoti is an outright entertainer and it will not let you down in terms of entertainment. It makes you laugh and cry". Shatarupa Bose reviewing in Anandabazar Patrika praised the performances of Chakraborty and Dev along with other cast, music, cinematography, screenplay and dialogues and noted that melodrama at the end of the movie could have been toned down.

== Controversy ==
After the release of the film, it was not allowed to be shown in Nandan Cinema Hall, in Kolkata, which is being operated by Government of West Bengal. Netizens replied that as the leading actor of the film Mithun Chakraborty is an active leader of Bharatiya Janata Party, the show has been cancelled. Following the decision of show cancellation, Producer and Supporting actor of the film Dev reacted by a post. In the post, Dev regretted for reply to that, Dev also reacted to sign more films again with the Bollywood's megastar under his banner (Dev Entertainment Ventures) if his budget matches. BJP member of Parliament Dilip Ghosh regretted that the movie has not been released in Nandan, because of Mithun's political status.

== Box office ==
The film collected ₹13−14 crore at the box-office against a budget of ₹1.5 crore and emerged as a blockbuster. The film earned an additional 5 crores by selling the digital streaming rights, which was acquired by Zee5.

== Accolades ==
- 2023: WBFJA Award for Best Popular Film
- 2023: WBFJA Award for Best Actor (Popular Choice)- Mithun Chakraborty
- 2023: WBFJA Award for Best Actor (Critic's Choice) - Dev Adhikari
- 2023: WBFJA Award for Best Comedian- Kharaj Mukherjee

== Sequel ==
On 1 January 2025, Dev announced on his X handle that a sequel to Projapati, titled Projapati 2 will be released in December 2025. Directed by Avijit Sen, and co-produced by Atanu RayChaudhuri, the film was released on 25 December 2025.
