= Hiralal (film) =

2021 Indian Bengali language biopic film

- Official Poster
- Bengali: হীরালাল
- Directed by: Arun Roy
- Starring: Kinjal Nanda; Saswata Chatterjee; Anuska Chakraborty; Shankar Chakraborty; Arna Mukhopadhyay; Tannishtha Biswas; Partha Sinha; Adhikary Koushik; Kharaj Mukherjee
- Cinematography: Gopi Bhagat
- Music by: Mayukh; Mainak
- Production company: Easel Movies
- Release date: 5 March 2021
- Country: India
- Language: Bengali

Hiralal is a Bengali-language biopic movie which is directed by Arun Roy and produced by Easel Movies. It is starring Kinjal Nanda, Saswata Chatterjee, Anuska Chakraborty, Shankar Chakraborty, Arna Mukhopadhyay, Tannishtha Biswas, Partha Sinha, Adhikary Koushik and Kharaj Mukherjee. The film was released on 5 March 2021.

== Plot ==
The film is a biopic, based on the life of famous director Hiralal Sen and how he contributed to Indian Cinema.

== Cast ==
- Kinjal Nanda as Hiralal Sen
- Kharaj Mukherjee as Girish Chandra Ghosh
- Saswata Chatterjee as Jamshedji Framji Madan
- Anuska Chakraborty as Hemangini
- Shankar Chakraborty as C.K. Sen
- Arna Mukhopadhyay as Amarendranath Dutta
- Tannishtha Biswas as Kusum Kumari Devi
- Partha Sinha as Motilal
- Adhikary Kaushik as Tarini Ukil
