= Ekenbabu =

Bengali fictional detective

Ekenbabu (transl. Mr. Eken) is a Bengali detective fictional character created by author Sujan Dasgupta. The first story of Ekenbabu, "Manhatane Moonstone" was published in Anandamela in 1991.

== Character ==
Ekenbabu is a police detective who looks like a very common Bengali man. He studied criminology in the United States. His real name is Ekendra Sen. He is eccentric, a little comical and takes snuffs. He is a man with a sweet smile, a bald head and a round face. Although he is a government employee, he likes to solve cases in his own style unlike a typical investigator. Ekenbabu is accompanied by his friends, Bapi and Promotho. Promotho is a chemistry postdoctoral researcher and Bapi is a physics professor at New York University who writes the stories of Ekenbabu. Bapi is like Dr. Watson, Hastings of Ekenbabu. This trio builds a bond that made readers relive the life in New York City as Bengali Indian immigrants. In later stories Eken Babu managed to get a Fulbright fellowship at New York University and Promotho has a girlfriend called Francisca that's going to develop within story progresses

== Stories ==
- "Manhattane Moonstone"
- "Manhattane Manhunt"
- "Dhaka Rahasyo Unmochito"
- "Ekenbabu O Keyadidi"
- "Sankhayar Sanket"
- "Shanti Niketon E Ashanti"
- "Harappar Shilalipi"
- "Spoken English Murder Mystery"
- "Melaben Tini Melaben"
- "Karmaphal"
- "Besuro Behalar Porer Kahini"
- "Manhattan e Madman"
- "Houseboat Nikhoj"
- "Asol Khunir Sondhane"
- "Ideal Jewelry"
- "Woodbridge Shohore"
- "Bhoyonkor Chithi"
- "Khuner Aage Khuni Khoja"
- "Columbus-ey Ekenbabu"
- "Priceless Buddha"
- "Manhattane Mystery Murder"
- "Nrityoshilpir Mrityu Tadonte Ekenbabu"
- "Eken Babu O Barman Barir Rahsya"
- "Puroshkar Panch Hazar Dollar"
- "Anguler Chhaap"
- "New Hope Diamonds"
- "Bouncy Ball"
- "Osommaner Biday"
- "Soundorya Boud"
- "Diamond For Ever"
- "Chadma Beshi Somoy"
- "Parswo Choritre Eken Babu"
- "Harano Prapti"

== Film adaptation ==
Film adaptations
| Year | Title | Based on |
|---|---|---|
| 2022 | The Eken | "Manhattaner Madman" |
| 2023 | The Eken: Ruddhaswas Rajasthan | "Osommaner Bidai" |
| 2025 | The Eken: Benaras e Bibhishika | "Ideal Jewellery" |
| 2026 | The Eken: Kerala-e Kurukshetra | |

A drama film, The Eken released on 8 April 2022, directed by Joydip Mukherjee. Anirban Chakrabarti played the title role. Suhotra Mukhopadhyay had played the role of narrator, Bapi and Somak Ghosh had played the role of Promotho. A new film, The Eken: Ruddhaswas Rajasthan, the previous film's cast reprising their roles which had premiered on 14 April 2023. The third film titled The Eken: Benaras e Bibhishika was announced in January 2025. The film is directed by Joydip Mukherjee and produced by Shrikant Mohta and Mahendra Soni under the banner of Shree Venkatesh Films and Hoichoi Studios. It was released in the theatres on 16 May 2025. It is based on the novel Ideal Jewellery.

The Fourth Film The Eken: Keralay Kurukshetra is set to release during Durga Puja on October 16, 2026.

== Television ==
Eken Babu web series is a comedy-detective series that was first released on 3 March 2018 with 6 episodes directed by Anirban Mallik. Later on 10 November 2018, Hoichoi released the second season of the web series but the second series was directed by Anupam Hari. The third season was directed by Abhijit Chowdhury. Anirban Chakrabarti reprised the role of Ekenbabu in all seasons. Eken babu's season 9 is set in Purulia. The series released on 15 April 2026, coinciding with the occasion of Poila Baishakh. The series is based on Sujan Dasgupta's Ekenbabu story, Bhoyonkor Chithi. The pre-credits scene of the final episode announced the next instalment of the film franchise, The Eken: Keralay Kurukkhetro that will be releasing on Durga Pujo 2026.

== Radio adaptation ==
Radio Mirchi Kolkata station aired Manhattan-ey Moonstone for Mirchi's Sunday Suspense Programme. Eken Babu was voiced by RJ Deep, Bapi by RJ Somak, Abinash by Sayak Aman, Sailen Sapui by RJ Mir, Pramotho by Agni and the story was narrated by RJ Deep. Even Manhattan ey Manhunt was adapted and released by the same program on YouTube on 31 July 2022.
