= Anirban Chakrabarti =

Indian Bengali actor

- Occupation: Actor
- Known for: Eken Babu, Jatayu
- Notable work: Eken Babu; Khadaan; Kakababur Protyaborton; The Eken; The Eken: Ruddhaswas Rajasthan; The Eken: Benaras e Bibhishika

Anirban Chakrabarti is an Indian Bengali film actor best known for portrayal of the character of Ekenbabu in a film franchise and separate web series under the same name. He has acted in several other thriller films including Kakababur Protyaborton (2022), Khadaan and Chaalchitro: The Frame Fatale (2024).

He has played the character of Jatayu in a web series directed by Srijit Mukherji and also acted in the internationally multiple award winner film Once Upon a Time in Calcutta directed by Aditya Vikram Sengupta. He is popular for his portrayal of the role of "Ekenbabu" in the films The Eken (2022), The Eken: Ruddhaswas Rajasthan (2023) and The Eken: Benaras e Bibhishika (2025).

== Career ==
In 2021, Chakrabarti acted in the internationally multiple award winner film Once Upon a Time in Calcutta. Between 2018 and 2021, Chakrabarti played the lead character Ekenbabu in the Eken Babu web series. His portrayal of the character received positive reception. He also acted in another web series Robindronath Ekhane Kawkhono Khete Aashenni (2021). After the success of Ekenbabu web-series, a film titled The Eken was released in 2022, in which he played the role of Ekenbabu. Following its success, he reprised his role of Ekenbabu in The Eken: Ruddhaswas Rajasthan (2023), which also became a box-office success. In 2023, he also played the lead negative role in Pradhan. In 2024, he acted in a number of films including Shastri and Khadaan, among which the latter went on to become one of the highest grossing Bengali films of all time.

== Filmography ==
=== Films ===
Key
†	Denotes films that have not yet been released

Year	Film	Role	Director	Ref.
2017	Meri Pyaari Bindu	Abhi's prospective father-in-law	Akshay Roy	
2019	Mitin Mashi	Police Officer Anishchay	Arindam Sil	
2020	Love Aaj Kal Porshu	Ganesh	Pratim D. Gupta	
2021	Mukhosh	Adrish Burman	Birsa Dasgupta	
2021	FIR	Inspector Paritosh Bairagi	Joydip Mukherjee	
2021	Once Upon a Time in Calcutta	Pradipta	Aditya Vikram Sengupta	
2022	Kakababur Protyaborton	Amal De	Srijit Mukherji	
2022	The Eken	Ekenbabu	Joydip Mukherjee	
2022	Bhotbhoti		Tathagata Mukherjee	
2022	Kolkata Chalantika	Shibaji	Pavel	
2023	Jai Kali Kalkattawali		Sudeshna Roy & Abhijit Guha	
2023	The Eken: Ruddhaswas Rajasthan	Ekenbabu	Joydip Mukherjee	
2023	Cheeni 2		Mainak Bhaumik	
2023	Pradhan	Jatileshwar Mukherjee	Avijit Sen	
2024	Shastri	Dipu	Pathikrit Basu	
2024	Khadaan	Balai Mandi	Soojit Dutta	
2024	Chaalchitro: The Frame Fatale	Naseer	Pratim D. Gupta	
2025	Oporichito	Inspector Avik Dutta	Joydip Mukherjee	
2025	Shotyi Bole Shotyi Kichhu Nei	Gaurang Aggarwal	Srijit Mukherjee	
2025	The Eken: Benaras e Bibhishika	Ekenbabu	Joydip Mukherjee	
2025	Mrigaya: The Hunt	Rudra	Abhirup Ghosh	
2025	Chandrabindoo	Uncle Paw	Raja Chanda	
2025	Sharthopor	Lawyer Tarak Halder	Annapurna Basu	
2025	Ranna Baati	Godot	Pratim D. Gupta	
2025	Projapati 2	Shakibul Hassan Jhontu	Avijit Sen	
2026	Bibi Payra	Jagannath	Arjunn Dutta	
2026	Santa †	TBA	Anshuman Pratyush	

=== Web series ===
Year	Film	Role	Director	Ref.
2018–2025	Eken Babu web series (Season 1–8)	Ekenbabu	Anirban Mallik, Anupam Hari, Abhijit Chowdhury, Joydip Mukherjee, Surajit Chatterjee	
2019	Water Bottle		Joydip Mukherjee	
2020	Lalbazaar		Sayantan Ghosal	
2020	Feluda Pherot (Season 1)	Jatayu	Srijit Mukherji	
2021	Maradonar Juto		Mainak Bhaumik	
2021	Robindronath Ekhane Kawkhono Khete Aashenni	OC Tapan Sikder	Srijit Mukherji	
2022	Byadh	Bishu	Abhirup Ghosh	
2022	Shob Choritro	Abinash Mitra	Debasish Sen Sharma	
2022	Feludar Goyendagiri (Season 1)	Jatayu	Srijit Mukherji	
2023	Dugdugi		Joydeep Mukherjee	
2024	Feludar Goyendagiri (Season 2)	Jatayu	Srijit Mukherji	
2024	Fasco	Sujit Bose	Anjana Basu	
2026	Kaalipotka	Rana	Abhirup Ghosh	

== Awards ==
- West Bengal Film Journalists' Association Awards- Best Performance In A Negative Role for FIR
- OTTplay Award Best Actor in a Comic Role –Series for Eken Babu -Season 6
