= Rough Night =

2017 film by Lucia Aniello

- Theatrical release poster
- Directed by: Lucia Aniello
- Written by: Lucia Aniello; Paul W. Downs
- Produced by: Matt Tolmach; Lucia Aniello; Paul W. Downs; Dave Becky
- Starring: Scarlett Johansson; Kate McKinnon; Jillian Bell; Ilana Glazer; Zoë Kravitz; Paul W. Downs
- Cinematography: Sean Porter
- Edited by: Craig Alpert
- Music by: Dominic Lewis
- Production companies: Columbia Pictures; LStar Capital; Matt Tolmach Productions; Paulilu Productions
- Distributed by: Sony Pictures Releasing
- Release dates: June 12, 2017 (New York City); June 16, 2017 (United States)
- Running time: 101 minutes
- Country: United States
- Language: English
- Budget: $20 million
- Box office: $47.3 million

Rough Night is a 2017 American black comedy film directed by Lucia Aniello (in her feature debut) and written by Aniello and Paul W. Downs. It stars Scarlett Johansson, Kate McKinnon, Jillian Bell, Ilana Glazer and Zoë Kravitz in lead roles, as well as Paul Downs, Ty Burrell and Demi Moore in supporting roles. The story follows a bachelorette party that goes wrong after a male stripper dies.

The film was released in the United States on June 16, 2017, by Sony Pictures Releasing through Columbia Pictures, received mixed reviews and grossed $47 million worldwide against a production budget of about $26 million.

== Plot ==
In 2006, Jess, Alice, Frankie and Blair bond during their first year of college. A decade later they reunite as Jess, now an aspiring politician, is about to marry her boyfriend Peter. Alice decides that the four should spend the weekend in Miami partying. They are also joined by Pippa, Jess's friend from her semester abroad in Australia. Alice, who considers herself to be Jess's best friend, is immediately jealous of Pippa.

The friends get high on cocaine and party at a club before deciding to hire a male stripper. At the vacation house, he makes Jess uncomfortable with his rough talk. Alice becomes aroused and jumps on him; the stripper is knocked to the floor and dies after striking his head on the fireplace. Before they decide what to do, Jess takes a call from Peter and mentions that her friends hired a stripper, and she is confused. Peter thinks that she is leaving him and becomes distraught. His friends tell him that he should drive down to Miami to win her back.

The friends purchase a burner phone to call Blair's lawyer uncle. After telling them they moved the body, he tells them they could face up to fifteen years in prison unless the body is never found. Pippa volunteers to pilot a jet ski out to the ocean and dump the body. After doing so, they think the neighbors' security camera caught them on tape, and send Blair to seduce them for the footage, only to discover the cameras don't work. By this point, the body has washed up back on the shore and they must come up with a new plan to dispose of it.

A uniformed police officer knocks on their door and Frankie knocks him out after he gropes her, only for them to realize he was the stripper they had hired, leaving them to wonder who was killed. They try to dispose of the body again after stealing the stripper's car, only to return defeated after causing the car to crash. Then, when Alice finds out Jess invited Frankie and Blair to a bridal shower over her, Jess berates her for her obsessive clinginess and storms off to prepare for the consequences.

At this point, two plainclothes police officers arrive and tell the women they are not in trouble as the man they killed was a violent criminal who had been on the run from the police. As they interrogate the women, Pippa sees on the TV that the "police" are actually accomplices of the dead man, who had double-crossed them during a heist of valuable diamonds. The thieves realize that they have been caught and tie their captives up, threatening to shoot them.

While preparing to surrender, Jess finds a letter from Alice revealing that she staged the party so that she could show the pictures to her mother, who is implied to have dementia. She exits the bathroom to find the criminals holding the women and the stripper captive as one searches the house for the diamonds. She subdues him using hairspray and handcuffs and fights off the other one as he prepares to kill Blair. After Alice shoots the second captor, the first escapes but is run over and killed by Peter, high on the drugs he took to keep him awake on his road trip to Miami.

Jess reaffirms that she wants to marry Peter and they do it that weekend at a foam party with their friends. The women have been pardoned for their act in eliminating the thieves. Jess wins her campaign. Frankie and Blair reunite as a couple and Alice hooks up with Scotty, the police officer stripper from the bachelorette party.

At Jess’s victory party, Pippa sings lyrics that allude to the evening. Afterwards, Alice finds the stolen diamonds stashed in a box of naughty pasta from the bachelorette party.

== Cast ==
- Scarlett Johansson as Jessica "Jess" Thayer
- Jillian Bell as Alice
- Kate McKinnon as Pippa/Kiwi
- Ilana Glazer as Frankie
- Zoë Kravitz as Blair
- Paul W. Downs as Peter
- Demi Moore as Lea
- Ty Burrell as Pietro
- Ryan Cooper as Jay ("Scotty"), the fake stripper
- Colton Haynes as Scotty McBody, the real stripper
- Dean Winters as Detective Frazier
- Enrique Murciano as Detective Ruiz
- Bo Burnham as Tobey
- Eric André as Jake
- Hasan Minhaj as Joe
- Patrick Carlyle as Patrick
- Karan Soni as Raviv
- Peter Francis James as Uncle Jack
- Caldwell Tidicue as DJ (Club Liv)
- Jaboukie Young-White as Borat

== Production ==
On the strength of Aniello's success with Broad City, the film was the subject of an intense bidding war, of which Sony Pictures Entertainment was announced as the winner in June 2015. The script was among the 2015 Black List of unproduced scripts. Aniello has referred to the movie as "a comedic version of The Big Chill".

In December 2015, Scarlett Johansson joined the film to play the lead role. In April 2016, Zoë Kravitz joined the film, with the rest of the main cast announced the next month. Principal photography began in August 2016 in Saddle Rock, New York. In late September 2016, filming was taking place in Mount Vernon, New York. The film spent $26 million in New York State and received $6 million in tax rebates.

The film was originally titled Rock That Body but was renamed to Rough Night, possibly due to copyright issues as "Rock Your Body" had already been used as a song title by Justin Timberlake.

== Music ==
Dominic Lewis composed the film's musical score.

== Release ==
=== Theatrical ===
Rough Night was scheduled to be released on June 23, 2017. It was then moved up a week to June 16.

=== Marketing ===
The studio spent about $35 million on promotion and advertisements.

=== Home media ===
Rough Night was released by Sony Pictures Home Entertainment for digital download on August 25, 2017. and on Ultra HD Blu-ray on September 5, 2017. HMV Store released the UK edition on DVD on December 26, 2017, alongside the Blu-ray.

== Reception ==
=== Box office ===
Rough Night grossed $22.1 million in the United States and Canada and $25.2 million in other territories for a worldwide total of $47.3 million, against a production budget of $20 million.

In North America, the film was released alongside All Eyez on Me, 47 Meters Down and Cars 3, and was initially projected to gross $10–14 million from 3,162 theaters in its opening weekend. After making just $3.4 million on its first day (including $700,000 from Thursday night previews ), weekend projections were revised to $9 million. It ended up debuting to $8 million, finishing 7th at the box office. In its second weekend the film grossed $4.7 million (a drop of just over 41%), finishing 8th at the box office.

=== Critical response ===
On Rotten Tomatoes, the film has an approval rating of 45% based on 173 reviews, with an average rating of 5.20/10. The website's critical consensus reads, "Rough Night's gifted stars are certainly good for some laughs, but their talents aren't properly utilized in a scattered comedy that suffers from too many missed opportunities." On Metacritic, the film has a weighted average score of 51 out of 100, based on reviews from 40 critics, indicating "mixed or average reviews". Audiences polled by CinemaScore gave the film an average grade of "C+" on an A+ to F scale, while PostTrak reported filmgoers gave it a 66% overall positive score.

Owen Gleiberman of Variety wrote: "Rough Night, a bachelorette-party-from-hell thriller comedy that's got some push and some laughs, despite its essentially formulaic nature, is a perfect example of why Hollywood needs (many) more women filmmakers."

The cast received positive notices, even though the film as a whole did not. Peter Travers of Rolling Stone wrote "The women in Rough Night are terrific company. They never wear out their welcome. You can't say the same for the movie." Manohla Dargis of The New York Times said "It's all blithely formulaic and would be more irritating if the performers — who include Zoë Kravitz and Illana Glazer — weren't generally so appealing." David Rooney of The Hollywood Reporter wrote: "All the talented women here are stuck playing types rather than characters, in a strained frolic in which both the verbal humor and the physical gags too often fall flat."

Critics have pointed out strong similarities between Rough Night and the 1998 Peter Berg black comedy Very Bad Things.

== Adaptation ==
The film was later adapted in India in Telugu language as Anukunnadi Okkati Ayyandhi Okati (transl. Planned for one, happened the other) which released on 6 March 2020 through Amazon Prime Video. Olokkhis in Goa, a loose television adaptation in Bengali, was released in 2023 on Klikk.

== See also ==
- The Two Deaths of Quincas Wateryell
- Jaane Bhi Do Yaaro
- Weekend at Bernie's
- Very Bad Things
