= The Eken =

2022 Indian Bengali film

- Official Theatrical Poster
- Directed by: Joydeep Mukherjee
- Written by: Padmanabha Dasgupta
- Screenplay by: Padmanabha Dasgupta
- Story by: Sujan Dasgupta
- Based on: Manhattan er Madman
- Produced by: Shrikant Mohta; Mahendra Soni
- Starring: Anirban Chakraborty; Suhotra Mukhopadhyay; Somak Ghosh; Payel Sarkar; Debasish Mondal
- Cinematography: Ramyadip Saha
- Edited by: Rabiranjan Maitra; Md. Piyasuddin
- Music by: Subhadip Guha
- Production company: SVF
- Distributed by: SVF
- Release date: 14 April 2022
- Running time: 132 minutes
- Country: India
- Language: Bengali
- Box office: ₹1.3 crore

The Eken is a 2022 Indian Bengali-language black comedy action thriller film directed by Joydeep Mukherjee. The film is produced by Shrikant Mohta and Mahendra Soni under the banner of Shree Venkatesh Films.The film is based loosely on the novel Manhattan-ey Madman. In the film, Anirban Chakrabarti plays the title role of Ekenbabu, a fictional detective created by the Bengali author, Sujan Dasgupta. Padmanabha Dasgupta has written the screenplay for the film.

It was released in theatres on 14 April 2022. It was well received by the audience and had a successful run at the box office. The second film of this series The Eken: Ruddhaswas Rajasthan was released on 2023 and third film The Eken: Benaras E Bibhishika was released on 2025.

At the end of the series Eken Babu season 9, the pre-credits scene indicated a sequel, The Eken: Keralay Kurukkhetro, which will be releasing on Durga Pujo 2026.

== Plot ==
During his trip to Darjeeling with Bapi and Promotho, Lalbazar detective, Ekendra Sen (Ekenbabu) has a chance of meeting with the famous film star, Bipasha Mitra, and gets caught up in the investigation of a missing ancestral photograph and a precious stamp that belonged to her grandfather. At the same time, Ekenbabu gets an offer from Bipasha's friend and business partner, Debraj Singh, to work on a murder case. The mystery deepens when he discovers a valuable Vishnu idol has been stolen from Bipasha's statue collection. He suspects that both the cases are linked to each other and doubts if both of his clients are telling the truth. He sets forth to find out the criminals with the help of the local police. The case becomes complicated as new facts come to light every now and then. However, Ekenbabu solves the case, catching the culprits with the help of a stranger who turns out to be on the same team as him.

== Cast ==
- Anirban Chakrabarti as Ekenbabu
- Payel Sarkar as Bipasha Mitra
- Suhotra Mukhopadhay as Bapi
- Somak Ghosh as Pramatha
- Debasish Mondal as Debraj Singh
- Debopriyo Mukherjee as Bubun Kar
- Indrajit Mazumder as Jiten Ghosh
- Kaushik Chattopadhyay as Jayanta Biswas

== Production ==
The principal photography of the film began on 28 January 2022. The film was wrapped up in February 2022 with a few scenes shot during the pandemic.

The cinematographer of the film is Ramyadip Saha. The editing of the film is done by Rabiranjan Maitra and Md. Piyasuddin. The production is designed by Ranjit Gorai. The costume designer is Jayanti Sen. The makeup is done by Sourav Ganguly. The sound is designed and mixed by Srijit Gupta.

== Release ==
The teaser of the film released on 22 March, 2022. The trailer of the film released on 25 March, 2022. The film released in theatres on 14 April, 2022 coinciding with Poila Baisakh or the Bengali New Year.

== Soundtrack ==
Track listing
No.	Title	Lyrics	Singer(s)	Length
1.	"The Eken (Title Track)"	Godhuli Sharma	Sidhu	2:29
Total length:				2:29

== Reception ==
Shamayita Chakraborty rated the film 4/5, reviewing for The Times of India and opined that the movie is worth watching for Eken Babu's humour and great performances but the plot is weak thus making the storyline predictable. Roushini Sarkar, reviewing for Cinestaan, rated 2/4 and opined that the movie has multiple twists, however, the writing is poor and the execution of twists is boring. She praised the performances of Mukhopadhay and Ghosh but criticized that of the others.
