= Bodhon (TV series) =

Indian Bengali social drama series

- Release poster
- Genre: Social Action Drama
- Based on: Rape; Gang rape
- Written by: Sarbari Ghosal
- Screenplay by: Sarbari Ghosal
- Directed by: Aditi Roy
- Starring: Ditipriya Roy; Sandipta Sen
- Theme music composer: Subhadeep Guha
- Composer: Subhadeep Guha
- Country of origin: India
- Original language: Bengali
- No. of seasons: 2
- No. of episodes: 14

Production
- Executive producer: Siddhant Sheth
- Producer: Mahendra Soni
- Production location: Kolkata
- Editor: Subhajit Singha
- Camera setup: Single-camera
- Running time: 19–28 Minutes
- Production company: Shree Venkatesh Films

Original release
- Release: 2022 – present

Bodhon is an Indian Bengali social action drama web series streaming on "Hoichoi". Directed by Aditi Roy in her directorial debut and written by Sarbari Ghosal, the series has been produced by Shree Venkatesh Films. The series stars Sandipta Sen and Ditipriya Roy in the lead roles, while Koushik Roy, Chandreyee Ghosh, Kaushik Chattopadhyay and Indrasish Roy play other pivotal roles.

Ditipriya Roy plays the role of a rape victim and Sandipta Sen plays the role of her college professor, who instigates her to not hush up the matter in fear of social stigma and instead, take the matter to the court to ensure that the rapists are subjected to stringent punishment. Bodhon marked the second collaboration between Sandipta Sen and Ditipriya Roy, 13 years after the TV series Durga. Two seasons of the series has been streaming till date on the Bengali OTT platform "Hoichoi".

== Overview ==
In the first season, Raka Sen returns to her graduation college in Kolkata as a professor. One day, she gets shocked to know that a second year student from her college, Shinjini, has been brutality raped by her friend's male peers while returning from a birthday party. In a society which quickly blames the woman, Raka comes forward as Shinjini's only support. Despite initial reluctance from Shinjini and her mother in fear of social shame, she instigated her to file a police complaint against her rapists. The rest of the story shows how Raka stands beside Shinjini during the whole procedure of her mental trauma and legal battle against the rapists who belong from influential families; protecting her from the victim blaming.

In the second season, Raka Sen goes to a rural village Ipilpur with her boyfriend turned husband Riju Ganguly for their honeymoon cum Riju's work. Within a few days, he realises that social injustice is deeply rooted in that apparently beautiful village and malpractices against women including child marriage, women trafficking and rape are prevalent. The region is controlled by a powerful local gang whose nexus operates the crimes against woman. It is led by Sukhen Chowdhury, who is the son of the treacherous local politician Satyaprakash Chowdhury. In an attempt to stop these inhuman crimes, Raka fights against the nexus but herself becomes a victim. The story further depicts Raka's resilience and determination to bring a down a corrupt force and lend justice to the victims of heinous social malpractices.

== Cast ==
- Sandipta Sen as Raka Sen
- Ditipriya Roy as Shinjini Mukherjee
- Pushpita Mukherjee as Shinjini's mother
- Chandreyee Ghosh as the public prosecutor
- Kaushik Chattopadhyay as the defence attorney
- Koushik Roy as Riju Ganguly, Raka's boyfriend turned husband
- Honey Bafna as Som, Shinjini's love interest
- Loknath Dey as Satyaprakash Chowdhury, a politician in Ipilpur
- Indrasish Roy as Sukhen Chowdhury, Satyaprakash's son
- Debojyoti Roy Chowdhury as Budhuya, Sukhen's associate
- Sampurnaa Mandal
- Soume Chatterjee
- Debdutta Raha
- Saptarshi Roy

== Episodes ==
Series	Episodes	Originally released
1	8	30 September 2022
2	6	22 December 2023

=== Season 1 (2022) ===
No.	Title	Directed by	Written by	Original release date
1	"Breaking New"	Aditi Roy	Sarbari Ghosal	30 September 2022
2	"New Town Rape Victim"	Aditi Roy	Sarbari Ghosal	30 September 2022
3	"Shut Up Shinjini"	Aditi Roy	Sarbari Ghosal	30 September 2022
4	"Face To Face"	Aditi Roy	Sarbari Ghosal	30 September 2022
5	"Ordinary Woman"	Aditi Roy	Sarbari Ghosal	30 September 2022
6	"Guilty or Not Guilty"	Aditi Roy	Sarbari Ghosal	30 September 2022
7	"Yes or No"	Aditi Roy	Sarbari Ghosal	30 September 2022
8	"The Awakening"	Aditi Roy	Sarbari Ghosal	30 September 2022

=== Season 2 (2023) ===
No.	Title	Directed by	Written by	Original release date
1	"Ipilpur"	Aditi Roy	Sarbari Ghosal	22 December 2023
2	"Ami Daini Noi"	Aditi Roy	Sarbari Ghosal	22 December 2023
3	"Bhoy"	Aditi Roy	Sarbari Ghosal	22 December 2023
4	"Palachhe"	Aditi Roy	Sarbari Ghosal	22 December 2023
5	"Jeebon-Mrityu"	Aditi Roy	Sarbari Ghosal	22 December 2023
6	"Ordi-NARI Woman"	Aditi Roy	Sarbari Ghosal	22 December 2023

== Production ==
=== Announcement and development ===
The first look posters of the lead characters Sandipta Sen and Ditipriya Roy were released in the first week of August. Ditipriya Roy mentioned in an interview that she agreed to the role offered to her, after she was narrated the script for the first time.

Sandipta Sen revealed in an interview that Bodhon 2 was not planned initially. Although not a direct sequel, the makers decided to make a spiritual sequel of Bodhon, after huge success of the first season. The characters of Sandipta and Indrasish were kept same from the first season, and Indrasish has become her husband from being her boyfriend in the first season. The rest of the script was new.

=== Pre production ===
We developed a unique bonding ever since day one of my first project with her. We understand each other very well and I think that is very important between a director and an actor — for me, to know what she wants and for her, to assess what I will be able to do. It has always been easy to work with her because she has a very clear vision of what she wants and communicates it clearly.

— Sandipta Sen, during an interview with t2 Online

Ditipriya Roy mentioned in an interview that she became busy with another project after signing Bodhon. To understand and fit into the psyche of a rape victim, she read multiple books about rape victims to understand their trauma, like Know My Name by Channel Miller. She also watched four to five films which deals with sexual violence against women.

=== Filming ===
"I remember while filming a scene for Bodhon in the dead of the night, some actors crucial to the scene were accidentally asked to pack off and leave before it got filmed. There was no way we could get them back that night but I had to finish the shoot. We managed that by changing the lensing of the camera."

— Aditi Roy, sharing an anecdote from the shooting of Bodhon 2

Major parts of the second season was filmed at a remote village in Jharkhand, where there was neither mobile network nor electricity was available. Sandipta Sen mentioned in an interview with Indulge Express that no network availability lead the cast and crew to spend more time among themselves instead of being stuck to their smartphones. She also told that the first brief which she got from Aditi Roy for Bodhon 2 was that she would need to hone her driving skills. Along with Indrasish, she performed all the action and fight sequences, without using a body double. The fighting scenes were improvised since they didn't have any fight master.

Sandipta shared her experience during the shooting, where she had to drive a car through narrow and muddy stretches of road during the chase sequences, where a single wrong turn could end her car into the adjoining ditches. In an interview with The Telegraph, she revealed that she was not a regular driver and Bodhon 2 was her first time driving on screen. She mentioned how different camera equipment were attached to the car and she had to be cautious about them all the time while driving, specially during the chase sequences.

== Release ==
The first season of Bodhon was streamed on 30 September 2022 on the Bengali OTT platform "Hoichoi". The second season Bodhon 2 was streamed on 26 December 2023 on "Hoichoi".

== Marketing ==
The trailer of first season of Bodhon was released on 25 September 2022. The trailer of the second season Bodhon 2 was released on 27 November 2023.

== Reception ==
=== Critical reception ===
==== Season 1 ====
Poorna Banerjee of The Times of India rated the series 3/5 stars and wrote "The series from the very beginning leaves one with discomfort – not just about the situation, but also the way the story moves forward." She praised Ditipriya Roy's performance as Shinjini and Chandreyee Ghosh's performance as Shinjini's lawyer but criticised the lack of a solid backstory for most of the characters, the excessive backstory for Raka, lack of strong dialogues and the weak screenplay. Vedant Karia of My Kolkata reviewed the series and highlighted "With eight episodes of sleek production, great performances and tight writing, Bodhon is definitely worth a watch."

Agnivo Niyogi of The Telegraph reviewed the series and opined "The girl’s scarred face after the assault, her mother’s pain, discomfort and shame, and Raka’s stubbornness to carry on with the fight produce a fertile ground for the director to strike gold. But Roy falls back on stereotypes to tell the story." He praised Sandipta Sen and Chandreyee Ghosh's performances but bemoaned the melodramatic screenplay, episodes ending in cliffhanger, the non-impactful twist, weak dialogues, Ditipriya's not-so-well acting and the hastily etched characters.

Shamayita Chakraborty of OTTplay rated the series 2.5/5 stars and noted "Bodhon chooses a sensitive issue of rape, the post-rape socio-legal battle of the woman, the insensitivity across society, and post-traumatic stress disorder of the protagonist. But finally, it fails to present a wholesome drama because of its careless making." She praised Ditipriya's acting and the courtroom drama but criticised the one dimensional build-up of the characters, the cliched and dull character portrayals, the over simplified narration, the not intensifying crises and the shoddy dialogues.

Archi Sengupta of Leisure Byte rated the series 2.5/5 stars and opined "Bodhon is a weirdly unfinished and rushed series that is a bit too similar to Sampurna is different ways. It doesn’t do anything new and repeats the same points that we have previously witnessed in other forms of media, just without a satisfying conclusion." She applauded the series for bringing up the issue of rape and its subsequent victim blaming in the society, Chandreyee and Sampurna and Ditipriya's performances but bemoaned Raka's character sketch, the comically bad painting of the rapists, the rushed flow in the story and the cliffhanger at the end.

Biswadip Dey of Sangbad Pratidin reviewed the series and wrote "Bodhon progresses as a mega serial. If the goal is to complete and serve a project quickly, this is bound to happen. It doesn't touch the audience either in the story or in the acting department. Initially, the suspense was starting to get in, but as the story progresses, it becomes evident that it will follow the stereotypical path." He praised Sandipta Sen and Chandreyee Ghosh's performances but criticised multiple aspects including the absence of a twist towards the end, hurriedly written characters, weak storyline, the illogical death, Ditipriya Roy's weak portrayal of a rape victim and the negligible rape case coverage by media, as portrayed in the series.

==== Season 2 ====
Poorna Banerjee of The Times of India rated the series 3.5/5 and highlighted "Bodhon 2 grips one from the very beginning and keeps them involved, through all the doom and gloom, to the very end. The best part is, it can be watched independently, even if one hasn’t seen the first season, as it stands on its own." She praised Sandipta's performance, her exchange with Indrasish, Indrasish's ruthless portrayal of the villain, the music and background score, and the well shot chase sequences but bemoaned Sandipta's weak rapport with her husband and the lack of space for comedy.

Shamayita Chakraborty of OTTplay rated the series 3/5 stars and worded it "Bodhon 2 is definitely a step up from the first season. While it is a cliched social drama that deals with the problems simplistically, the tight script, beautiful location, and Indrasish keep us hooked." She praised the grim and convincing storyline, interesting character sketches, focus on multiple issues, better storytelling than the first season, performance of the new cast in the second season and the picturesque locations but bemoaned the over-the-top dramatisation, the weak chemistry between Riju and Raka and the simplistic approach to address the concerns.
