= The Eken: Ruddhaswas Rajasthan =

2023 Indian Bengali film

- Theatrical release poster
- Directed by: Joydip Mukherjee
- Written by: Padmanabha Dasgupta
- Screenplay by: Padmanabha Dasgupta
- Story by: Sujan Dasgupta
- Based on: Sosommane Bidai.
- Produced by: Shrikant Mohta; Mahendra Soni
- Starring: Anirban Chakrabarti; Suhotra Mukhopadhyay; Somak Ghosh; Sandipta Sen; Rajatava Dutta; Rajesh Sharma
- Cinematography: Ramyadip Saha
- Edited by: Rabiranjan Maitra
- Music by: Subhadeep Guha
- Production company: SVF
- Distributed by: SVF
- Release date: 14 April 2023
- Running time: 121 minutes
- Country: India
- Language: Bengali
- Box office: ₹3.5 crore

The Eken: Ruddhaswas Rajasthan (transl. The Eken: The Breathless Rajasthan) is a 2023 Indian Bengali-language black comedy action thriller film directed by Joydip Mukherjee. The film is produced by Shrikant Mohta and Mahendra Soni under the banner of Shree Venkatesh Films. It is the second film of Ekenbabu franchise and is primarily based on the story Osommaner Bidai. The first film of the franchise The Eken was released in 2022. Third part of this series called The Eken: Benaras e Bibhishika was released on 2025.

In the film, Anirban Chakrabarti plays the titular role of Ekenbabu, a fictional detective created by the Bengali author, Sujan Dasgupta. Padmanabha Dasgupta has written the screenplay for the film.

== Plot ==
Eken Babu, Bapi and Promotho are enjoying their vacation in Rajasthan. They've put up at Bapi's brother, Sayan and his wife, Anusuya's house in Jaisalmer. While on a local sightseeing trip, they run into Shatadru Ghosh, Professor of Archeology at Oxford University. His student, Rajyashri Sen, is the curator at Jaisalmer Museum and he is here on her invitation. Shatadru informs Eken Babu about his suspicions about a valuable Natesa idol he had seen in London. Upon coming across a catalogue of Tarokiv Auction House, he suspected that most of the idols auctioned there are from India, particularly from Rajasthan. Hence, he is here to confirm his suspicions.

Eken Babu meets Rajyashri and her Bengali boyfriend, Sumanta, who is the administrator at the museum. Upon a close inspection of the Natesa idol, Eken Babu discovers it's a fake. At the same time, the famous and precious Kalibangan bull statue goes missing from the museum. Eken Babu begins his investigation and figures out that both the idol and the statue has been smuggled out of the country. Eken Babu investigates and learns that Sumanta had lied about his whereabouts on the night the Kalibangan bull statue went missing. The cops arrest Sumanta for having stolen and smuggled out the bull statue. But the latter informs them that the one he had smuggled in exchange for money was a fake too. Eken Babu also suspects that Shatadru Ghosh is impersonating the real professor for some ulterior motive.

Rajyashri reaches out to Ananda Gupta, a chemistry professor for help. He is well-known for collecting and preserving artefacts. Meanwhile, Rajyashri goes missing. Ananda informs Eken Babu and the police that she had visited his house before she went missing. He further informs the police that Rajyashri had hidden the real Kalibangan bull statue and replaced it with a replica because she knew it would be stolen. Anand hands over a note left by Rajyashri to Eken Babu. He realises that Rajyashri's riddle has clues to finding the real Kalibangan bull statue. And the sooner they crack it, the better.

Eken Babu and his friends try hard to solve the riddle but it continues to baffle him and constantly challenges his intelligence and observation skills. As the adventure in Rajasthan gets mysterious, Eken Babu finally decodes the riddle with the help of Prof. Shatadru Ghosh, thus proving his suspicion wrong. Eken Babu succeeds in catching the culprit behind the disappearance of Rajyashri and the mastermind behind the smuggling racket.

== Cast ==
- Anirban Chakrabarti as Ekenbabu
- Somak Ghosh as Promotho
- Suhotra Mukhopadhyay as Bapi
- Sandipta Sen as Rajyashree
- Rajatava Dutta as Professor Shatadru Ghosh
- Rajesh Sharma as Anand Gupta
- Sudip Mukherjee as Inspector Adarsha Srivastav

== Release ==
=== Theatrical ===
The film released in theatres worldwide on 14 April 2023 coinciding with Poila Baisakh or the Bengali New Year.

=== Home media ===
The film was streamed on the OTT platform Hoichoi on 16 June 2023. Later it has been made available on Amazon Prime Video.

== Future ==
Sequel The Eken: Benaras e Bibhishika was released in summer 2025.
