= Eken Babu (TV series) =

Bengali web series

- Promotional Poster
- Genre: Detective; Crime; Mystery; Comedy; Thriller
- Based on: Ekenbabu
- Screenplay by: Padmanabha Dasgupta
- Directed by: Joydip Mukherjee; Surajit Chatterjee; Anupam Hari; Anirban Mallik; Abhijit Chowdhury
- Theme music composer: Mayukh Mainak
- Country of origin: India
- Original language: Bengali
- No. of seasons: 9
- No. of episodes: 60

Production
- Production company: Eyewash Production

Original release
- Release: 3 March 2018 – present

Eken Babu is a Bengali-language web series streaming on Hoichoi. The web series is based on Ekenbabu detective story, which is written by Sujan Dasgupta Anirban Chakraborti plays the title role, with Shuhotro Mukhopadhay and Somak Ghosh in supporting roles.

== Cast ==
- Anirban Chakrabarti as Ekenbabu
- Shoumo Banerjee as Bapyaditya or Bapi (season 1 to 5)
- Debapriyo Bagchi (Bubble) as Promotho (season 1 to 5)
- Suhotra Mukhopadhyay as Bapi (Since Season 6)
- Somak Ghosh as Promotho (Since Season 6)
- Shreya Sinha as Rupal Mehra IPS
- Yash Roshan as Mamud (in Season 3)
- Shahdul Alam Sachchu as Jamal (in Season 3)
- Ziaul Hasan Kislu as Masud (in Season 3)
- Shimul Khan as Mr. Khan (in Season 3)
- Quazi Nawshaba Ahmed as Meherunisa (in Season 3)
- Anuradha Mukherjee (in Season 4)
- Kaushik Chatterjee as Tunganath Burman (in Season 4)
- Kaushiki Guha as Arundhati Burman (in Season 4)
- Debopriyo Mukherjee as Riddhi Burman (in Season 4)
- Chitra Vanu Basu (in Season 4)
- Kinjal Kumar Nanda as Satyakam Javed Chowdhury (in Season 4)
- Mridul Chandra Sen (in Season 4)
- Sohini Banerjee (in Season 4)
- Sourav Chatterjee as Suresh Mitra (in Season 5)
- Mimi Dutta as Soma Mitra (in Season 5)
- Krishnendu Dewanji as Ajay (in Season 5)
- Biswajit Chakraborty as Khokha Mama
- Rajnandini Paul as Paramita (Season 8)
- Rahul Banerjee as Avik (SEASON 8)
- Saonli Chattopadhyay as Monica (Season 9)
- Shankar Chakraborty as Shubhankar (Season 9)
- Sumanta Mukherjee as Amiyo Maharaj (Season 9)

== Episodes ==
Season overview

Series	Episodes	Originally released
1	10	3 March 2018
2	6	10 November 2018
3	5	28 November 2019
4	6	2 October 2020
5	6	8 October 2021
6	6	23 December 2022
7	7	8 December 2023
8	7	23 January 2025
9	7	15 April 2026

=== Season 1 (2018) ===
The first season is directed by Anirban Mallik, it streamed on Bengali OTT platform hoichoi from 3 March 2018. It was based on the story "Manhattane Moonstone".

No.	Title	Directed by	Original release date
1	"Two deaths, one mystery"	Anirban Mallik	3 March 2018
2	"Suicide or Murder?"	Anirban Mallik	3 March 2018
3	"Doubt... Doubt..."	Anirban Mallik	3 March 2018
4	"An Astrologer's Day"	Anirban Mallik	3 March 2018
5	"The Diary"	Anirban Mallik	3 March 2018
6	"Murder He Says"	Anirban Mallik	3 March 2018
7	"The Missing Friday"	Anirban Mallik	3 March 2018
8	"Pink Elephant"	Anirban Mallik	3 March 2018
9	"Hard Rock"	Anirban Mallik	3 March 2018
10	"Final Showdown"	Anirban Mallik	3 March 2018

=== Season 2 (2018) ===
The second season released on 10 November 2018; all the episodes were directed by Anupam Hari. The story is based on "Manhattan ey Man hunt".

No.	Title	Directed by	Original release date
1	"Bentumashir Goendagiri"	Anupam Hari	10 November 2018
2	"Natural death, ami penguin"	Anupam Hari	10 November 2018
3	"Dui Mrityu Ekdine"	Anupam Hari	10 November 2018
4	"This Man Is Something"	Anupam Hari	10 November 2018
5	"Sunglass Pore Rajnikanth"	Anupam Hari	10 November 2018
6	"Bhol Bodoler Rongo"	Anupam Hari	10 November 2018

=== Season 3 (2019) ===
The third season aired on 28 November 2019; all the five episodes were directed by Abhijit Chowdhury. The story is set in Bangladesh, and most of the shooting is also done in Bangladesh. It was based on the story, "Dhaka Rahasyo Unmochito".

No.	Title	Directed by	Original release date
1	"Destination Dhaka"	Abhijit Chowdhury	28 November 2019
2	"Mrityu Mystery"	Abhijit Chowdhury	28 November 2019
3	"Ekengiri"	Abhijit Chowdhury	28 November 2019
4	"Highly Suspicious"	Abhijit Chowdhury	28 November 2019
5	"Kolkata Chalo"	Abhijit Chowdhury	28 November 2019

=== Season 4 (2020) ===
On 2 October 2020, hoichoi released Season 4 with six new episodes directed by Joydip Mukherjee and Surajit Chatterjee. It was based on the story "Ekenbabu O Barman Bari Rahasya".

No.	Title	Directed by	Original release date
1	"Shiraz-er Biriyani"	Joydip Mukherjee, Surajit Chatterjee	2 October 2020
2	"Agontuk"	Joydip Mukherjee, Surajit Chatterjee	2 October 2020
3	"Chitro Bichitro"	Joydip Mukherjee, Surajit Chatterjee	2 October 2020
4	"Jolponar Kolpona"	Joydip Mukherjee, Surajit Chatterjee	2 October 2020
5	"Porda Phash"	Joydip Mukherjee, Surajit Chatterjee	2 October 2020
6	"Shunani"	Joydip Mukherjee, Surajit Chatterjee	2 October 2020

=== Season 5 (2021) ===
On 8 October 2021, hoichoi released Season 5 with six new episodes directed by Anirban Mullick. It is based on the story, "Sankhyar Sanket". Eken Babu season 5, titled "Eken Babu: Santiniketan Shanket Mochon,"

No.	Title	Directed by	Original release date
1	"Thik Duppurbela"	Anirban Mallik	8 October 2021
2	"Kothay Pabo Tare?"	Anirban Mallik	8 October 2021
3	"Outhouse-ey Henyali"	Anirban Mallik	8 October 2021
4	"Ulot Puran"	Anirban Mallik	8 October 2021
5	"Female Moumachhi"	Anirban Mallik	8 October 2021
6	"National Anthem"	Anirban Mallik	8 October 2021

=== Season 6 (2022) ===
On 20 September 2022, hoichoi announced Season 6. The series started streaming from 23 December 2022. It was based on the story "Asol Khunir Sondhane". From this season the actors of the role of both Bapi and Promotho were changed.Eken Babu season 6, titled "Eken Babu Ebar Kolkatay".

No.	Title	Directed by	Original release date
1	"Kolkatay Kelenkari"	Joydip Mukherjee	23 December 2022
2	"Picnic"	Joydip Mukherjee	23 December 2022
3	"Doping"	Joydip Mukherjee	23 December 2022
4	"Badminton"	Joydip Mukherjee	23 December 2022
5	"Destination Ranchi"	Joydip Mukherjee	23 December 2022
6	"Tribhuj na Choturbhuj"	Joydip Mukherjee	23 December 2022

=== Season 7 (2023) ===
Eken Babu season 7, titled "Tungkulung E Eken," premiered on December 8th, 2023. The season follows Eken Babu, Bapi, and Promotho on vacation in Tungkulung."Tungkulung E Eken" is based on the detective story "Khuner Age Khuni Khoja".

No.	Title	Directed by	Original release date
1	"Tungkulung"	Joydeep Mukherjee	8 December 2023
2	"Rail Roko"	Joydeep Mukherjee	8 December 2023
3	"Bish"	Joydeep Mukherjee	8 December 2023
4	"Ondher Joshthi"	Joydeep Mukherjee	8 December 2023
5	"Hirer Sandhaney"	Joydeep Mukherjee	8 December 2023
6	"Otit-er Khonjey"	Joydeep Mukherjee	8 December 2023
7	"Bhanumotir Khel"	Joydeep Mukherjee	8 December 2023

=== Season 8 (2025) ===
The eighth season is titled "Puro Puri Eken". As the title suggests, the story is based on Puri. The series is based on the story "Nrityoshilpir Mrityu Tadonte Ekenbabu".

No.	Title	Directed by	Original release date
1	"Raghurajpure Rawktopaat"	Joydip Mukherjee	23 January 2025
2	"Khondogirir Laash"	Joydip Mukherjee	23 January 2025
3	"Guest House-ey Khun"	Joydip Mukherjee	23 January 2025
4	"Samudra Phiriye Dey"	Joydip Mukherjee	23 January 2025
5	"Plot Bordhon"	Joydip Mukherjee	23 January 2025
6	"Shakkhigopal"	Joydip Mukherjee	23 January 2025
7	"Khuner Panda"	Joydip Mukherjee	23 January 2025

=== Season 9 (2026) ===
Eken babu's season 9 is set in Purulia. The series released on 15 April 2026, coinciding with the occasion of Poila Baishakh. The series is based on Sujan Dasgupta's Ekenbabu story, Bhoyonkor Chithi. The pre-credits scene of the final episode announced the next instalment of the film franchise, The Eken: Keralay Kurukkhetro that will be releasing on Durga Pujo 2026.

No.	Title	Directed by	Original release date
1	"Panna Udhao"	Joydeep Mukherjee	15 April 2026
Eken Babu, Bapi and Pramatha came for the trip and mutton, Purulia served them a stolen emerald and a mystery instead.
2	"Humkir Teer"	Joydeep Mukherjee	15 April 2026
Eken Babu only wanted a sweet. Instead he finds a centuries old mystery and a stubborn tiny companion.
3	"Jwole Bhashe Laash"	Joydeep Mukherjee	15 April 2026
At the ashram, clues slowly fall into place. But behind the strict no-meat rule lies something unexpected.
4	"Pyanchar Pyanchal"	Joydeep Mukherjee	15 April 2026
Raju's murder, two cases, one empty stomach, a blackout and a missing book. Eken Babu is having a very bad day.
5	"Foske Gelo"	Joydeep Mukherjee	15 April 2026
A fellow detective surfaces in the ashram. The mutton on a leaf plate finally arrives, and so does the missing emerald.
6	"Chhayabaji"	Joydeep Mukherjee	15 April 2026
The emerald is back but the mystery refuses to leave. Sambuddho has a new riddle and Eken Babu has a gun to his head.
7	"Barbar Ghughu Tumi"	Joydeep Mukherjee	15 April 2026
Just as Eken Babu closes in on the truth and dreams of a sweet reward, he suddenly vanishes without a trace. Does this give way to a new mystery?

== Dubbed version ==
From November 2025 to December 2025 Sony SAB released Eken Babu in Hindi dub. Eken's voice was dubbed in Hindi by Jaydeep Sen. He is from Kolkata.
