= Shob Choritro =

Bengali language Thriller web series

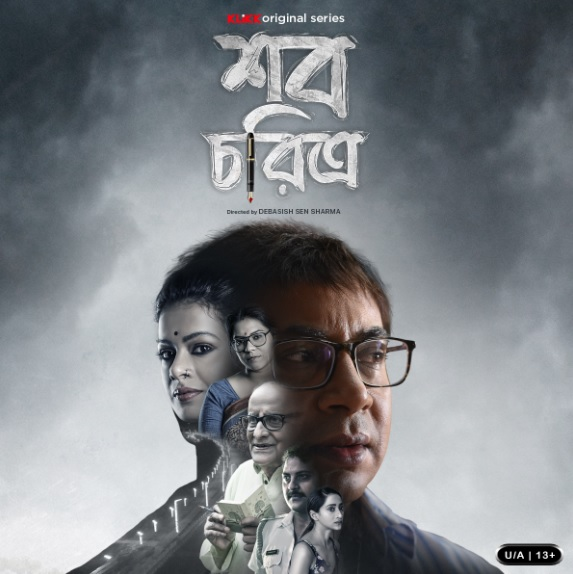
- Genre: Thriller
- Written by: Balaka Ghosh, Debasish Sen Sharma
- Directed by: Debasish Sen Sharma
- Starring: Anirban Chakrabarti, Paran Bandopadhyay, Iman Chakraborty, Payel Roy, Ankita Majhi, Judhajit Sarkar
- Music by: Sangit Biswas
- Composer: Sayantan Ghosh
- Country of origin: India
- Original language: Bengali
- No. of seasons: 1
- No. of episodes: 5

Production
- Executive producers: Piyush Ghosh, Arindam Goswami
- Producer: Deb Sarkar
- Cinematography: Amlan Saha
- Editor: Koustav Sarkar
- Production company: Milkyway Films

Original release
- Network: Klikk
- Release: 21 February 2022

Shob Choritro is an Indian Bengali language Thriller streaming web series directed by Debasish Sen Sharma. The series starring Anirban Chakrabarti, Paran Bandopadhyay, Iman Chakraborty, Payel Roy, Ankita Majhi, and Judhajit Sarkar are in main role.

== Plot ==
Abinash Mitra, a writer, is looking for a story, a story from a real person. In a tea stall, he meets K.C. Nag, a mathematics maverick whose life he follows with interest. A tragedy occurs when they become engaged in each other's lives. As a result of Abinash's failure with K.C Nag, he encounters Senjhuti and his boyfriend Anwar. Senjhuti dies one fine night after Abinash starts following her. Abinash Consults a psychiatrist to determine whether he has a superpower. A mythological character may be a good subject for his writing, she suggests. The case is taken up by police inspector Debabrata, who begins to conduct an investigation and he finds some clues.

== Cast ==
- Anirban Chakrabarti as Abinash Mitra
- Paran Bandopadhyay as K.C Nag
- Iman Chakraborty as Mrinalini
- Payel Roy as Tulika
- Ankita Majhi
- Judhajit Sarkar

== Episodes ==
No.	Title	Directed by	Written by	Original release date
1	"KC Nag and Mathematics"	Debasish Sen Sharma	Balaka Ghosh, Debasish Sen Sharma	21 February 2022
Abinash Mitra is a writer who is in search of a story, a story from a real-life person. He meets a very interesting character K.C. Nag a mathematics maverick in a tea stall and starts following his life. They both get engaged in each other’s life and a tragedy happens.
2	"Death in the lane"	Debasish Sen Sharma	Balaka Ghosh, Debasish Sen Sharma	21 February 2022
After his failed attempt with K.C. Nag, Abinash comes across the very daring Senjhuti and his boyfriend Anwar. Abinash starts to follow her /them and one fine night Senjhuti dies. Does Abinash have a superpower?
3	"Superpower to kill"	Debasish Sen Sharma	Balaka Ghosh, Debasish Sen Sharma	21 February 2022
Abinash consults a psychiatrist. She suggests him to write about dead people, may be some mythological character. Meantime police inspector Debabrata takes up the case and starts investigation. He finds some clue.
4	"Mahabharat returns"	Debasish Sen Sharma	Balaka Ghosh, Debasish Sen Sharma	21 February 2022
Abinash realizes that he has some superpower. He gets convinced when she sees Minalini in his friend’s party and finds resemblance to his character. He gets scared. Is Mrinalini going to die next?
5	"The final mystery"	Debasish Sen Sharma	Balaka Ghosh, Debasish Sen Sharma	21 February 2022
Abinash plans to kidnap Mrinalini and keeps him in a safe shelter. Debabrata plans a trap to catch him. Seema, Soma and Tulika becomes pivotal roles in the plan. Will Abinash be able to survive? Or one more death?
