= Johny Bonny =

2022 Bengali language web series

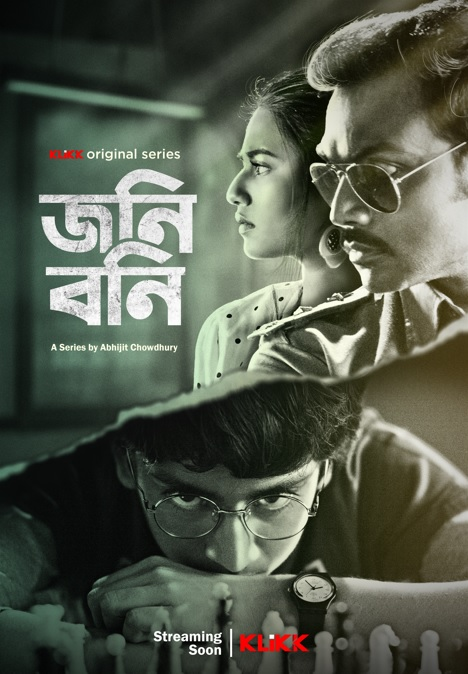
- Genre: thriller
- Written by: Abhijit Chowdhury
- Story by: Abhijit Chowdhury
- Directed by: Abhijit Chowdhury
- Starring: Kamaleshwar Mukherjee; Debashish Mondal; Ankit Majumder; Swastika Dutta; Jayati Chakraborty; Pushpita Mukherjee
- Music by: Akib Hayat
- Country of origin: India
- Original language: Bengali
- No. of seasons: 1
- No. of episodes: 6

Production
- Producer: Deb Sarkar
- Cinematography: Subhadeep Dey

Original release
- Network: Klikk
- Release: July 2022

Johny Bonny is a 2022 Indian Bengali language thriller web series written and directed by Abhijit Chowdhury. The series is produced by Deb Sarkar.

The main cast of the series is Kamaleshwar Mukherjee, Debasish Mondal, Ankit Majumder, Swastika Dutta, Jayati Chakraborty and Pushpita Mukherjee.

== Plot ==
The story is on the chess game, the policing system, and the dream of a young cop and a boy. It is Johny and Bonny's first investigation-related story.

Johny, a young police officer who wants to become a well-known investigator, ends himself working as a security cover for Promod Sen, a prominent politician whose wife Suroma makes out to adore Johny as if he were her own son. In addition, despite Pramod's protests, Johny is permitted to work mostly as a housekeeper, buying food for the household or regularly walking their daughter's dog. Johny must keep lying to his wife Ankhi about his duties in order to protect his pride.

Bonny, Ankhi's nephew, who is 13 years old, quits his Durgapur home and travels to Janardan's home to play chess in Kolkata. Johny and Bonny have a difficult relationship, similar to Tom and Jerry. Johny is a traditionalist who believes children should respect adults. Bonny asserts that in the modern environment, kids can be smarter and more logical than adults. Johny tries to tell Ankhi one of his made-up tales from while he was on duty, but every time Bonny calls them flat lies, Johny is unsuccessful.

However, when three armed criminals try to enter Promod's house, things swiftly get out of hand. Johny puts up a fight against the invaders despite being shot, which takes extraordinary bravery. Johny discovers over the course of his inquiry that Promod Sen's daughter has been missing ever since the tragedy. The attack was carried out by some very powerful individuals, Johny realises during the investigation, and his department is hesitant to solve the case. At the same time, the Bonny chess tournament gets underway. Bonny wants to help Johny, but Johny doesn't want it.

== Cast ==
- Kamaleshwar Mukherjee
- Debasish Mondal
- Swastika Dutta
- Jayati Chakraborty
- Ankit Majumder
- Pushpita Mukherjee
- Judhajit Sarkar
- Loknath Dey

== Episodes ==
No.	Title	Directed by	Original release date
1	"Johny Meets Bonny"	Abhijit Chowdhury	July 2022
A rookie police officer Janardan Das aka Johny has been assigned to maintain security at the residence of influential minister Pramod Sen. Johny wants to change his duty. Meanwhile, unexpectedly Bonny comes all the way from Durgapur to take part in a Chess Tournament in Kolkata.
2	"The Game Begins"	Abhijit Chowdhury	July 2022
Bonny starts rigorous training under the tutelage of coach Amal Mitra. A few miscreants suddenly attack politician Pramod Sen at his house. Johny puts his own life at stake to save the minister.
3	"The Mighty Affair"	Abhijit Chowdhury	July 2022
Janardan returns from hospital amidst much adulation and appreciation. His seniors appoint the task of solving the case to him on his own insistence. Janardan and Sub Inspector Biswajit Dalal go to Pramod Sen's house to interrogate him. While checking the CCTV footages Janardan spots someone suspicious that bolsters his anticipation.
4	"One flew over the Cuckoo's Nest"	Abhijit Chowdhury	July 2022
Janardan starts interrogating different people to solve the case. Based on the information from several people Johny and Bonny go to Natunpalli to interrogate Rokeya Mondal under disguise.
5	"If you can hear it, you can bear it!"	Abhijit Chowdhury	July 2022
Rokeya Mondal gets arrested for illegal alcohol business. Janardan starts talking to a number of close friends and aides of Rimi to find her. He retrieves a laptop with. At home, Bonny tries to retrieve an address from the laptop.
6	"Pride and Greed Bring Destruction"	Abhijit Chowdhury	July 2022
Janardan reaches Biswajit Dalal's house and confronts him. Biswajit tries his best to divert Janardan. Bonny goes to Pramod Sen's residence, to play a game of chess. Back at home, Bonny deciphers a very crucial clue while listening to Rimi's voice note.

== Reception ==
Binged gave it 8.7 out of 10 ratings.

== Soundtrack ==
1. Johny Bonny (Original Score from the series)

No.	Title	Singer(s)	Length
1	Johny Bonny	Akib Hayat	3:11
		Total Length	3:11
