= Prankenstein =

Indian Bengali language web series

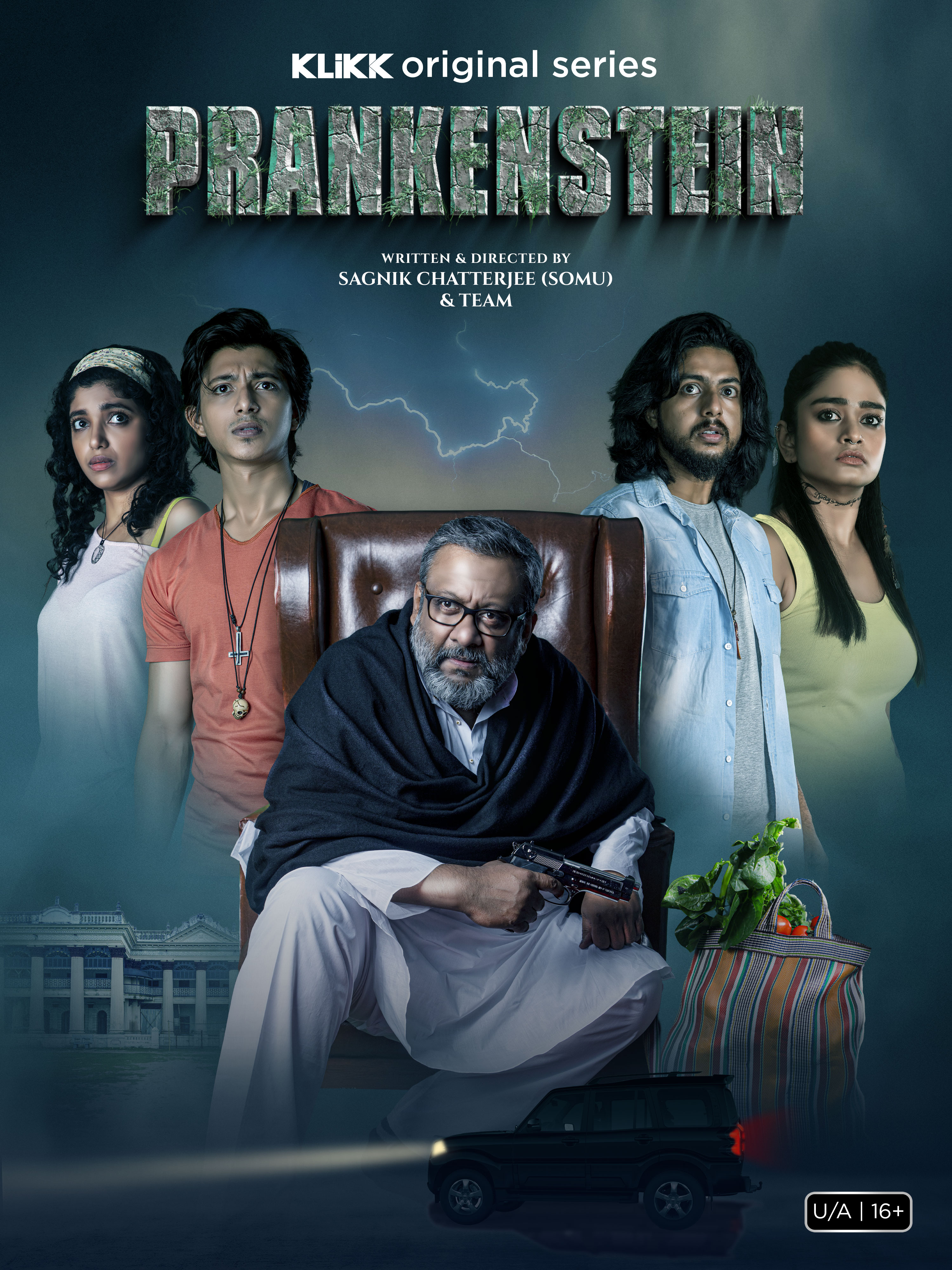
- Genre: Psychological thriller
- Screenplay by: Sagnik Chatterjee
- Story by: Sagnik Chatterjee
- Directed by: Sagnik Chatterjee
- Starring: Kaushik Ganguly; Dip Dey; Sritama Dey; Remoo; Ipsita Kundu
- Music by: Rajdeep Ganguly
- Country of origin: India
- Original language: Bengali
- No. of seasons: 1
- No. of episodes: 4

Production
- Producer: Milky Way Films
- Cinematography: Arindam Bhattacharjee

Original release
- Network: Klikk
- Release: 22 April 2022

Prankenstein is a 2022 Indian Bengali language Psychological thriller web series directed by Sagnik Chatterjee and produced by Milky Way Films. The series starring Kaushik Ganguly, Dip Dey, Sritama Dey, Remoo and Ipsita Kundu are in the lead roles. The music for the film is scored by Rajdeep Ganguly and cinematography is done by Arindam Bhattacharjee. The music for the film is scored by Rajdeep Ganguly and cinematography is done by Arindam Bhattacharjee.

== Plot ==
A renowned prankster group ‘Prankenstein’ has been invited to the YouTube Fan Fest in Mumbai this year. To celebrate the occasion, they go to party overnight in an old Palace on the city outskirts. However, some strange incidents alter their course of life. After reaching the palace, the boys (Ruben and Vicky) go ahead to buy some beers while the girls (Shireen and Aru) stay in their party-room. When the boys return, they are astonished to witness what they see in the room. A middle-aged man is holding the girls at gunpoint, while they clutched on to each other, trembling heavily with fear. The kidnapper claims that he is a diehard follower of their YouTube channel, and he always wanted this opportunity to meet them in person. He too, had a prank channel on YouTube previously, but could not make it big. He resented them initially, but later realized that this group had something in them, that he lacked. Therefore, as a diehard follower, he wanted to make them do a prank of his own choice.

However, they have no option but to agree to his demands. He hands them his first suggestion of a prank, which they must finish as a task. The prank seems like an easy one and an effortless task for the pranksters as they had done much bigger and better pranks than this one. But when they pursue the trail, things take a nasty turn, and they end up killing an innocent person, involved in their prank. In paranoia, fear, and haste, they rush back to the palace to find their kidnapper, watching pictures of their killing on his laptop. Since they did could not complete the prank successfully, they are told to do a second task.

Unfortunately, this time another person gets killed accidentally by them. Panic-stricken for having committed two murders in one night, the group rushes back to the palace to confront their handler. They get perplexed to see that their handler has these entire proceedings on tape, too, and fear that any retaliation from their end may see them behind bars.

== Season 1 (2022) ==
The first season of Prankenstein started streaming in April 2022 on Klikk Ott platform.

== Episodes ==
No.	Title	Directed by	Original release date
1	"Knock Knock!! Who's there?"	Sagnik Chatterjee	22 April 2022
A renowned prankster group ‘Prankenstein’ has been invited to the YouTube Fan Fest in Mumbai this year. To celebrate the occasion, they go to party overnight in an old palace on the city outskirts, where a mysterious old man breaks in and makes them hostage at gunpoint. The man has come with his long-awaited dream to get associated with the famous Prankenstein on a prank. So, he forces them to do a prank of his choice.
2	"The Game is on!"	Sagnik Chatterjee	22 April 2022
The given prank seems to be an easy one and an effortless task for the pranksters as they had done much bigger pranks than this one. They were asked to stage a taxi-hijack prank, but when they pursue the trail, things take a nasty turn, and they end up killing an innocent person, involved in their prank. Since they could not complete the prank successfully, the old man assigns them a second task.
3	"The night is still young."	Sagnik Chatterjee	22 April 2022
This time, they were supposed to break in a house and stage a simple robbery-prank with a family. Unfortunately, this time another person gets killed accidentally by them. Panic-stricken for having committed two murders in one night, the group rushes back to the palace to confront their handler. Since the old man's conditions were not met again, they had to do a prank right there in the room, which became a game of death for the four pranksters.
4	"Redemption"	Sagnik Chatterjee	22 April 2022
The final showdown revolves around the game of death which the pranksters have to face. Will they survive? Or it will be an end for the famous ‘Prankenstein’ ? To unravel the riveting narrative, one will have to watch till the end.

== Soundtrack ==
1. Prankenstein (Original Score from the series)

No.	Title	Singer(s)	Length
1	Phire Jao	Rupankar Bagchi	4:05
		Total Length	4:05

2. Prankenstein (Music from the Series)

No	Title	Singer(s)	Length
1	Aji Jhoro jhoro Mukhoro	Bidisha Biswas & Atanu Mitra	2:13
2	Purano Shei Diner Kotha	Rajdeep Ganguly	2:17
		Total Length:	4:30

== Cast ==
- Kaushik Ganguly
- Dip Dey as Ruben
- Sritama Dey as Shireen
- Ipsita Kundu as Aaru
- Remoo as Vicky
- Rohini Chatterjee as Gauri
- Bhaskar Dutta as Taxi Driver
- Somnath Bhattacharjee as Mr. Goswami
- Priyadarshini Dasgupta as Mrs. Goswami
- Ayantika Paul as Daughter
