= Durga Durgeshwari =

Indian Bengali-language television soap opera

- Also known as: Durga Durgeshwari
- Genre: Indian soap opera Drama
- Created by: SVF
- Screenplay by: Arpita Paul; Dialogues; Soumya Pakrashi
- Story by: Sahana
- Directed by: Anupam Hari
- Creative director: Sahana
- Presented by: SVF Entertainment
- Starring: Sampurna Mondal; Bishwarup Banerjee; Swagata Mukherjee
- Voices of: Upali Chattopadhyay; Sobuj Asish
- Theme music composer: Jeet Ganguly
- Composer: Jeet Ganguly
- Country of origin: India
- Original language: Bengali
- No. of episodes: 233

Production
- Producers: Shrikant Mohta; Mahendra Soni
- Production location: Kolkata
- Running time: 22 minutes
- Production company: SVF

Original release
- Network: Star Jalsha
- Release: 2 September 2019 – 19 July 2020

Related
- Durga

Durga Durgeshwari is an Indian Bengali-language television soap opera, a sequel /reboot version of the popular series Durga. It follows the journey of Dugga who has to vanquish the Evil with the blessings of Maa Durgeshwari. The show stars Sampurna Mondal and Bishwarup Bandyopadhyay as protagonists, where as Ankita Majhi and Swagata Mukherjee as antagonists. It premiered on 2 September 2019 on Bengali GEC Star Jalsha. The series was aired every day at 6:30pm. The show took Guriya Jekhane Guddu Sekhane's time slot before being replaced by Titli. Before ending, a new storyline was introduced with new protagonists (Ravi Shaw and Adrija Roy) but failed to gain good trp unlike the prequel.

This series is considered as a spiritual sequel or a reboot of the 2008 hit series of the channel - Durga that starred Sandipta Sen in Star Jalsha, who introduced this series in a launch promo.

== Plot ==
Dugga is a simple village girl who is an ardent devotee of Maa Durga. She lives in an ancient Durgeshwari temple at Ishwaripur. Goddess Durgeshwari guards the temple herself. The temple is also famous for the secret presence of an ancient transcript Vabishya varati by which one can control anyone's fortune. In spite of many constraints, Dugga gets the right over temple for worship and meets Omkar in a series of events.

Omkar, a talented astrologer, the real heir to the famous Roychowdhury family in Kolkata, is tortured by his aunt Ujjaini (a fake astrologer) and uncle Kinkar after accidental death of Omkar's parents, for keeping him mentally unstable to suppress his talent. Oneday, Ujjaini learns of the famous Vabishya varati transcript and wants to exploit it for power after Omkar marries Dugga. She goes to the temple but is attacked by Dugga. So she tries to destroy the temple including Dugga and Omkar but her plan backfires and she becomes paralysed. Meanwhile, Kinkar calls Damini (the first wife of Omkar's father Rupankar RoyChowdhury who was driven out of the family for her attempt to murder her husband for properties) for snatching the transcript. Damini (a lady tantrik now) comes back to the RoyChowdhury family for revenge. She welcomes Dugga in the Roychowdhury mansion, pretending to be innocent. Then she blackmails Dugga for the transcript and kidnaps Omkar at the latter's refusal. But, Dugga finds Omkar with the help of Maa Durga. Then, Damini tries to kill Dugga. Dugga is saved by the grace of Durgeshwari but loses her memory. Meanwhile, Maa Durga takes the humanoid form to vanquish the Evil. Later, Dugga reaches in RoyChowdhuri house and regains her memory with Maa's blessings. Damini and Kingkar are exposed after their failed attempt to kill Omkar. They are arrested. But, Damini vows revenge.

22 years later, after Omkar and Dugga's demise, the story continues with their daughter Devi. Damini returns in disguise for revenge and unsuccessfully tries to kill Devi. For Dugga's soul, Damini is arrested and Devi marries her lover Babon. They live happily ever after with the blessing of Maa Durgeshwari.

== Cast ==
- Sampurna Mondal as Durga RoyChowdhury
- Bishwarup Bandyopadhyay as Omkar RoyChowdhury
- Adrija Roy as Devi RoyChowdhury (Omkar-Durga's daughter)
- Payel De as Ma Durgeshwari/ Uma
- Manasi Sinha as Alokananda Mitra
- Ravi Shaw as Pushkar Mitra/Babon, a psychiatrist, the son of Alokananda Mitra, Devi's husband
- Swagata Mukherjee as Damini RoyChowdhury, first wife of Rupankar
- Ankita Majhi as Ujjaini RoyChowdhury, a fraud astrologer, wife of Dipankar
- Bhaskar Banerjee as Deendayal (dead), the priest of the temple.
- Rohit Mukherjee as Kinkor RoyChowdhury, Jagari's husband, Mrinnay's father, Omkar's uncle
- Mousumi Saha as Jagari RoyChowdhury, Kinkor's wife, Mrinnay's mother
- Basanti Chatterjee as Ujjaini's and Agomoni's mother and Omkar's maternal grandmother
- Runa Bandyopadhyay as Rupankar, Kinkar, Dipankar's mother, Omkar, Mrinmay's grandmother
- Sandip Chakraborty as Dipankar RoyChowdhury, Ujjaini's husband, Omkar and Mrinnay's uncle
- Priya Malakar as Urvasi RoyChowdhury, Mrinnay's wife
- Sourav Banerjee as Mrinmay RoyChowdhury, son of Kinkar and Jagari
- Bodhisattwa Majumdar as Doctor
- Songjukta Roy Chowdhury as Mohana, the elder paternal aunt of Omkar and Mrinnay
- Nabanita Dutta as Nayana, the younger paternal aunt of Omkar and Mrinnay
- Sujan Mukhopadhyay as Rupankar Roychowdhuy, Damini and Agomoni's husband, Omkar's father
- Kanyakumari Mukherjee as Agomoni Roychowdhuy, second wife of Rupankar, Omkar's mother
- Aditya Chowdhury as Descendant of Zamindar who built the Durgeshwari temple
- Rii Sen as Ginni maa, the wife of the Zamindar
- Sandipta Sen as Durga Roychowdhury in a special appearance

== Guest appearances ==
- Sandipta Sen as Durga: Story teller (Special appearances from Durga season-1)
