= Klikk =

Indian video-on-demand service

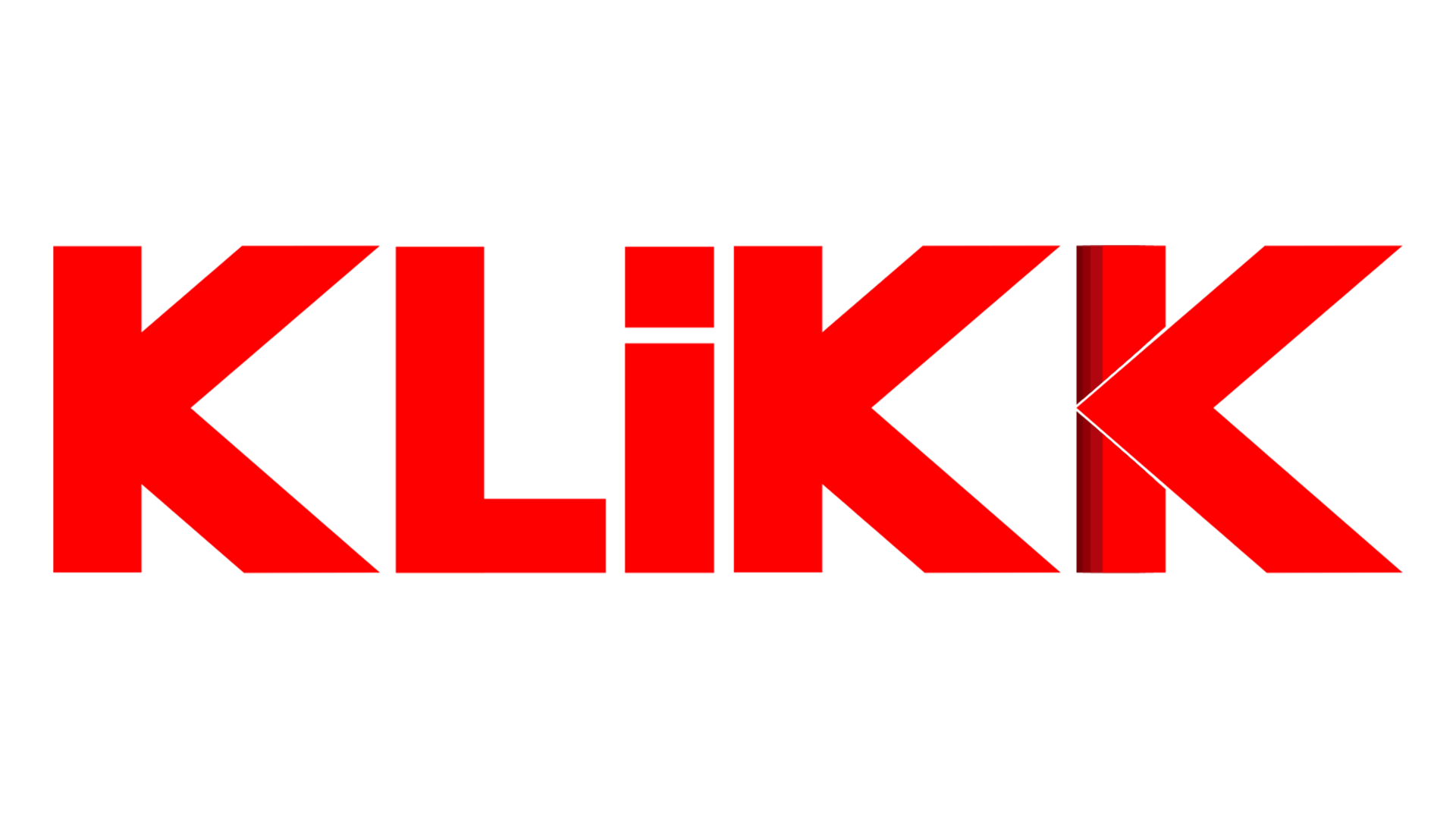
- Company type: Private
- Website type: OTT platform
- Available in: Bengali
- Headquarters: Kolkata, West Bengal, India
- Country of origin: India
- Area served: Worldwide
- Owner: Angel Television Private Limited
- Founder: Vikash Tantiya
- Industry: Entertainment; Mass media
- Website: www.klikk.tv
- Commercial: Yes
- Registration: Required
- Launched: 10 November 2020; 5 years ago
- Current status: Active

Klikk is a Bengali language video-on-demand, OTT, streaming service owned and maintained by Angel Television Private Limited with headquarters in Kolkata, India.

== History ==
In 1986, Angel Television Private Limited was founded in Kolkata, India, and started its business with movie acquisitions. In 2020, when Klikk was launched by Vikas Tantiya, the company got transformed into a fully vertically integrated studio.

A short videos sharing mobile app Chingari was collaborated with Klikk in 2021.

KliKK is available for Android, iOS, Amazon Fire TV, Android TV, Jio Store and Mi TV.

== Content ==
Klikk focuses on original web series, television programmes, feature films, short films, animated films, and a library of over 1000 Bengali language films across many genres.

== Klikk Originals ==
=== Web series ===
Year	Title	Director	Cast	Genre
2023	Olokkhis in Goa	Joydip Banerjee	Anuradha Mukherjee, Priyanka Bhattacharjee, Avery Singha Roy, Priyanka Mondal	Comedy
2023	Honeymoon	Soumik Chattopadhyay	Aishwarya Sen, Subrat Dutta and Sean Banerjee	Thriller and crime
2022	Iti Memories	Samadarshi Dutta	Soumya Mukherjee, Tanika Basu, Avijit Dutt	Romance, Drama
2022	60 Er Pore	Souvik Dey	Joy Sengupta, Rupanjana Mitra, Anindya Banerjee, Amyth Sethi, Joy Badlani	Drama
2022	Inspector Nalinikanta	Soumik Chattopadhaya	Rajatava Dutta, Subrat Dutta, Rupsha Chatterjee, Mishka Halim	Thriller, Suspense
2022	Sesh Mess	Rohan Sen	Rohan Sen, Sayonima Roy	Romance
2022	VBA	Soumit Deb	Debraj Bhattacharya, Samadarshi Dutta, Sabuj Bardhan, Saoli Chattopadhyay, Anujoy Chattopadhyay	Comedy
2022	Bhagar	Rajdeep Ghosh	Sabyasachi Chowdhury, Rajatava Dutta, Aindrila Sharma, Amlan Majumder, Biplab Bandyopadhyay, Pritam Das, Pooja Sarkar	Drama, Thriller
2022	Johny Bonny	Abhijit Chowdhury	Kamaleshwar Mukherjee, Debasish Mondal, Ankit Majumder, Swastika Dutta, Jayati Chakraborty and Pushpita Mukherjee	Psychological Thriller
2022	Roktopolash	Kamaleshwar Mukherjee	Kamaleshwar Mukherjee, Silajit Majumder, Debdut Ghosh, Ashim Roy Chowdhury, Ananya Sengupta, Utsav Mukherjee	Drama
2022	Encrypted	Souptick C	Payel Sarkar, Aishwarya Sen, Richa Sharma, Amitabh Acharya, Rana Mukherjee and Rana Basu Thakur	Thriller
2022	Prankenstein	Sagnik Chatterjee	Kaushik Ganguly, Dip Dey, Sritama Dey, Remoo and Ipsita Kundu	Psychological Thriller
2022	Search	Sandip Sarkar	Sabyasachi Chakraborty, Kaushik Sen, Joy Sengupta, Madhumita Sarcar, Biswajit Chakraborty, Mithu Chakraborty, Rajesh Sharma	Thriller, Crime
2022	Katakuti	Raja Chanda	Sourav Das, Manasi Sengupta, Devtanu, Paean Sarkar, Abhijit Guha and Sirsha Rakshit	Thriller, Crime
2022	Shob Choritro	Debasish Sen Sharma	Anirban Chakrabarti, Paran Bandopadhyay, Iman Chakraborty, Payel Roy, Ankita Majhi, and Judhajit Sarkar	Psychological Thriller
2021	Sleelatahanir Pore	Reshmi Mitra	Abhishek Chatterjee, Soumitra Chatterjee, Devlina Kumar, Moubani Sorcar, Rahul Banerjee, Sreela Majumdar	Thriller, Suspense
2021	Danny Detective Inc.	Anjan Dutt	Barun Chanda, Ankita Chakraborty, Anjan Dutt, Sudipa Basu,	Thriller
2021	Roopkathar Radio	Sayan Dasgupta	Biswanath Basu, Pinky Banerjee, Sujata Daw, Samir Biswas, Baby Sarkar, Tarun Chakraborty, and Shahana Sen	Thriller (6 episodes)

=== Films ===
Year	Title	Director	Cast	Genre
2022	60 Er Pore	Souvik Dey	Joy Sengupta, Rupanjana Mitra, Anindya Banerjee, Amyth Sethi, Joy Badlani	Drama
2021	Antardwanda	Sandip Sarkar	Joy Sengupta, Madhumita Sarkar, Biswajit Chakraborty	Thriller
2021	Sleelatahanir Pore	Reshmi Mitra	Abhishek Chatterjee, Soumitra Chatterjee, Devlina Kumar, Moubani Sorcar, Rahul Banerjee, Sreela Majumdar	Thriller, Suspense
2020	Ebhabei Golpo Hok	Rohan Sen	Bibriti Chatterjee, Ananda S. Chaudhuri, Sujata Ghosh	Drama
2020	Din Ratrir Golpo	Prosenjit Choudhury	Rajatava Dutta, Pradip Mukherjee, Rumki Chatterjee, Sourav Chakraborty, Debesh Roychoudhury, Supriti Choudhury, Rayati Basu	Drama, Crime
2019	Bhalobasar Galpo	Raja Sen	Saswata Chatterjee, Dulal Lahiri, Kaushik Banerjee, Chitra Sen, Rupanjana Mitra, Debdut Ghosh, Debika Sengupta	Drama
2017	Onek Holo..Ebar Toh Moro	Mayukh Chatterjee, Indraneel Dasgupta	Kharaj Mukherjee, Paran Banerjee, Kanchan Mullick	Romance, Comedy
