= F.I.R No. 339/07/06 =

Indian Bengali crime thriller film

- Official poster
- Directed by: Joydip Mukherjee
- Written by: Joydip Mukherjee & Aniruddha Dasgupta
- Starring: Ankush Hazra; Ritabhari Chakraborty; Bonny Sengupta; Falaque Rashid Roy
- Cinematography: Rupanjan Paul
- Edited by: Somnath Dey
- Music by: Nabarun Bose
- Production companies: Shadow Films; Roadshow Productions and RT Network
- Release date: 10 October 2021
- Country: India
- Language: Bengali
- Box office: ₹2 crore (equivalent to ₹2.2 crore or US$230,000 in 2023)

F.I.R No. 339/07/06 is a 2021 Indian Bengali-language crime thriller film written and directed by Joydip Mukherjee. The film stars Ankush Hazra, Ritabhari Chakraborty, Bonny Sengupta, Falaque Rashid Roy and Shantilal Mukherjee in the lead roles. The film was released on 10 October 2021 coinciding with the Puja holidays. The film premiered on ZEE5 on 22 October 2021, 12 days after the release.

== Plot ==
Lalbazar crime branch assigned Abhrajit Dutta to solve a series of murder mysteries in Raghunathpur village, Birbhum district. Abhrajit realises that local police officials are also involved in crimes. A gangster Mishra uses young bloods for his illegal business like smuggling, immoral trafficking and extortion. Abhrajit befriended doctor Esha and sub inspector Naren. He decides not to leave the village without solving the murder case.

== Cast ==
- Ankush Hazra as ACP Abhrajit Dutta, Lalbazar Crime Branch
- Ritabhari Chakraborty as Dr. Esha Chakraborty
- Bonny Sengupta as SI Naren Basak
- Falaque Rashid Roy as Shiuli
- Shantilal Mukherjee as Bhagirath Mishra, a local gangster
- Priyanka Bhattacharya as Dipanwita
- Sucharita Mukherjee as Esha's mother
- Anirban Chakrabarti as Inspector Paritosh Bairagi

== Soundtrack ==
Track listing
No.	Title	Lyrics	Music	Singer	Length
1.	"Monta Missing"	Rohan Ghosh	Savvy	Dilshad Nahar Kona	4:56
2.	"Aguner Poroshmoni"	Rabindranath Tagore	Rabindranath Tagore, Nabarun Bose	Madhuraa Bhattacharya	3:06

== Production ==
The list of actors and actresses of the film was released from the producer(s). That list shows that Ankush Hazra, Ritabhari Chakraborty, Bonny Sengupta, Falaque Rashid Roy, Anirban Chakrabarti and Shantilal Mukherjee are acting in the film.

== Award ==
- West Bengal Film Journalists' Association Awards- Best Performance In A Negative Role- Anirban Chakrabarti (Won)
