= Kaalipotka =

- Genre: Action thriller
- Written by: Abhirup Ghosh
- Directed by: Abhirup Ghosh
- Starring: Swastika Mukherjee; Anirban Chakrabarti; Sreya Bhattacharya; Shruti Das; Himika Bose
- Country of origin: India
- Original language: Bengali
- No. of seasons: 1
- No. of episodes: 7

Production
- Producer: Abhirup Ghosh
- Cinematography: Subhadeep Naskar
- Production company: Edgy Entertainment

Original release
- Network: ZEE5
- Release: 23 January 2026

Kaalipotka is a 2026 Indian Bengali-language action thriller web series directed and written by Abhirup Ghosh. Produced by Edgy Entertainment, the series stars Swastika Mukherjee, Anirban Chakrabarti, Sreya Bhattacharya, Shruti Das, and Himika Bose in the lead roles. The series premiered on ZEE5 on 23 January 2026.

The series centres on four women from marginalised backgrounds whose lives intersect following an accidental death, leading them into a violent conflict involving organised crime and law enforcement.

== Premise ==
The narrative follows Srima, Rani, Rinku and Minoti—four women from disparate socio-economic backgrounds—who are drawn together by the accidental death of Minoti's husband. In their attempt to conceal the incident, they become entangled with Rana, a violent former convict, while simultaneously facing pressure from the local police. As events escalate, the women are forced to confront issues of power, survival and systemic exploitation.

== Cast ==
- Swastika Mukherjee as Srima
- Anirban Chakrabarti as Rana
- Sreya Bhattacharya as Minoti
- Shruti Das as Rani
- Himika Bose as Rinku
- Souman Bose as Mona

== Episodes ==
=== Season 1 ===
No.	Title	Directed by	Written by	Original release date
1	"Barood"	Abhirup Ghosh	Abhirup Ghosh	23 January 2026
Srima, Rani, Rinku, and Minoti share a close friendship while struggling to stay ahead of businessman Rana and loan agent Mona. Their fragile balance collapses after the sudden death of Minoti’s husband, setting off a dangerous chain of events.
2	"Deshlai"	Abhirup Ghosh	Abhirup Ghosh	23 January 2026
Grieving and overwhelmed, Minoti leans on Srima for support, drawing Rani and Rinku into shared responsibilities. As hidden motives, money, and loyalty intertwine, their situation spirals rapidly out of control.
3	"Solte"	Abhirup Ghosh	Abhirup Ghosh	23 January 2026
The police investigation intensifies with new discoveries that complicate the case. With suspicion tightening around Minoti, Srima crafts a risky plan with Rani and Rinku to redirect attention.
4	"Agun"	Abhirup Ghosh	Abhirup Ghosh	23 January 2026
Financial strain and long-buried secrets push the bond between the four women to its breaking point. As investigators draw closer, Srima’s instincts are tested like never before.
5	"Phulki"	Abhirup Ghosh	Abhirup Ghosh	23 January 2026
A shocking incident destroys the women’s attempt to rebuild their lives. Surrounded by eerie signs and growing fear, they confront unresolved trauma and question what the future holds.
6	"Shihoron"	Abhirup Ghosh	Abhirup Ghosh	23 January 2026
Chaos erupts in Rani’s life when a masked attacker delivers a threatening warning. With no safe escape, the women reunite to face the danger that could change everything.
7	"Dhamaka"	Abhirup Ghosh	Abhirup Ghosh	23 January 2026
Rana returns, fueled by vengeance, forcing the women into a final and unpredictable confrontation. With their lives on the line, survival becomes their only goal.

== Production ==
The series was produced by Abhirup Ghosh under the banner of Edgy Entertainment. Principal photography was conducted in West Bengal, with Subhadeep Naskar serving as the director of cinematography. The music for Kaalipotka was composed by Kuntal De, with lyrics written by Victor Mukherjee. The title track, also titled Kaalipotka, features vocals by Jojo Mukherjee, along with rap performances by the lead actresses Swastika Mukherjee, Shruti Das, Himika Bose and Sreya Bhattacharya.

== Release ==
The official trailer of the series was released on 16 January 2026. Kaalipotka began streaming on ZEE5 from 23 January 2026.

== Reception ==
Reviewing the series for The Times of India, Poorna Banerjee gave it 3.5 out of 5, remarking that the narrative loses momentum in its middle stretch but recovers toward the end. She described Kaalipotka as a compelling watch for audiences interested in bleak, female-centric storytelling.

Aratrika Dey of Ei Samay observed that the series is not without flaws, but highlighted its performances and language as key strengths, adding that its impact builds slowly over the course of the narrative.
