= Oporichito =

2025 Indian Bengali film

- Theatrical release poster
- Directed by: Joydeep Mukherjee
- Screenplay by: Padmanabha Dasgupta
- Story by: Padmanabha Dasgupta
- Dialogues by: Padmanabha Dasgupta
- Produced by: Ashok Dhanuka; Himanshu Dhanuka
- Starring: Ritwick Chakraborty; Ishaa Saha; Anirban Chakrabarti
- Cinematography: Tuban
- Edited by: Ravi Ranjan Maitra
- Music by: Songs: Suvam Moitra; Score: Binit Ranjan Maitra
- Production company: Eskay Movies
- Release date: January 10, 2025
- Running time: 127 minutes
- Country: India
- Language: Bengali

Oporichito (transl. The Stranger) is a 2025 Indian Bengali psychological thriller film directed by Joydeep Mukherjee. Written by Padmanabha Dasgupta, the film has been produced under the banner of Eskay Movies. It stars Ritwick Chakraborty, Ishaa Saha and Anirban Chakrabarti in the lead roles.

Binit Ranjan Maitra has composed the background score while Suvam Moitra has made the songs. The film was announced in November 2024. It was released in the theatres on 10 January 2025. It is available for streaming on Amazon Prime Video.

== Synopsis ==
In a serious car accident in England, Rajan survives but loses part of his memory. He soon learns that his wife Ria, who was with him when the accident happened, is missing.

Police officer Avik Dutt starts looking into the case. Ranjan tries to remember what happened before the accident. He also begins to doubt the people around him. His wife soon becomes a suspect. Aranya, with whom Ria was having an alleged affair, also comes under suspicion.

As the search continues, Ranjan and Dutt's own pasts become connected to the investigation. These events lead them to reconsider the circumstances surrounding the accident and Ria's disappearance.

== Cast ==
- Ritwick Chakraborty as Ranjan Ghosal, a librarian
- Ishaa Saha as Ria Ghosal, Ranjan's wife
- Anirban Chakrabarti as Avik Dutt, a police officer
- Saheb Bhattacharya as Aranya, Aditi's alleged lover
- Kamaleshwar Mukherjee as Subhankar Bhaduri
- Priya Karfa as Avik's wife
- Isadora Baccon as Kritika, Ranjan's assistant

== Reception ==
=== Critical reception ===
Poorna Banerjee of The Times of India rated the film 2.5/5 stars and wrote "Oporichito is an average watch, offering a few moments of intrigue but falling short of leaving a lasting impression." She praised the performance of the lead cast and the cinematography but criticized the slow screenplay, non-impactful dialogues, tonal inconsistencies, accent inconsistencies and the hushed climax.

Debatri Ghosh of Anandabazar Patrika rated the film 6.5/10 stars and noted "The film, which is a little over two hours long, has a strong story line, but it remains a bit dull due to the lack of enough mystery." She appreciated the performance of the cast but bemoaned the slow pace in the first half, the weak screenplay, the unnecessary grey canvas used throughout the film, the predictable twist and multiple loopholes in the plot.

Shampali Moulik reviewed the film and opined "Overall, although the style of this thriller is familiar, the oscillation between trust and disbelief is extremely intriguing." She applauded the seasoned performance of the actors but bemoaned the weak screenplay, slow pacing in the first half and the weak writing with respect to developing the mystery.
