= Sampoorna (TV series) =

Indian television drama series

- Genre: Drama
- Based on: Noshtoneer
- Written by: Samragnee Bandyopadhyay
- Screenplay by: Aditi Powar
- Directed by: Shashank Bharadwaj
- Creative director: Amit Anand
- Starring: Sandipta Sen; Aham Sharma; Vishal Aditya Singh; Riyaa Kapoor
- Composer: Rajan Zala
- Country of origin: India
- Original language: Hindi
- No. of episodes: 85

Production
- Executive producers: Sumeet Dubey; Fuzel Ahmed Khan
- Producers: Mahendra Soni; Shrikant Mohta
- Editor: Omkar Singh
- Camera setup: Multi-camera
- Running time: 11–24 minutes
- Production company: Shree Venkatesh Films

Original release
- Network: StarPlus
- Release: 8 September – 9 December 2025

Sampoorna is an Indian Hindi-language drama television series that aired from 8 September 2025 to 9 December 2025 on StarPlus. Produced by Shree Venkatesh Films, it stars Sandipta Sen, Aham Sharma and Vishal Aditya Singh, marking the Hindi television debut of Sen and return of Sharma to television after a hiatus of six years. It is the Hindi remake of the Bengali web series Noshtoneer starring Sen herself as the protagonist. As a planned finite series, the show completed its run on 9 December 2025 completing 85 episodes.

== Plot ==
The series revolves around the life of a happily married businesswoman Mitti Kapoor Malhotra. Her husband Dr. Aakash Malhotra, whom she married going against her family is the top heart surgeon of Chandigarh. Aakash is a man of high morals, respects women and helped Mitti establish her boutique business. The couple lives a happy life with their son, Chirag. Soon Aakash helps Mitti reconcile with her family. However their happiness is short lived, when amidst the celebration of their seventh wedding anniversary, Aakash's former intern Naina Singh attempts suicide after accusing him of exploiting her for his sexual needs after having a brief extramarital affair and ghosting her after she got impregnated with his unwanted child and blacklisting her from job opportunities through the misuse of his position which leads to immediate arrest of Aakash.

However Mitti refuses to believe her and blames her of exploiting Aakash for money extortion while assuming that the Investigating Officer SI Satyendra Prasad Lohar, who also happens to be her former college friend and one-sided lover is intentionally torturing Aakash as a punishment for not getting her. Mitti's in-laws start detesting her for her breaking familiar rules and unusual ways to get Aakash bailed out while Naina demands for a DNA test in court to prove herself. However due to Aakash's junior Prithvi's goons harassing her family, Naina takes the complaint back claiming she did everything for money extortion and moves back to her hometown thus clearing Aakash of all charges.

While Naina slips into coma due to harassment by Prithvi's goons, Mitti starts noticing strange behavioral changes in Aakash and starts suspecting him and comes across Naina's cousin Simran who reveals how Aakash indeed used Naina by lying about his unhappy marriage and starting an affair in the pretext of divorce proceedings, false promise of marriage, a secret engagement and then leaving her after getting her impregnated. Simran also reveals that Aakash and Prithvi bribed her greedy father with a large sum of money to keep Naina away. Soon it is revealed that Prithvi, who happens to be the son of a local politician, works on Aakash's commands to keep his forged MBBS degree hidden.

Shattered Mitti decides to expose and divorce Aakash and get Naina justice but she is also revealed to be pregnant with another child of Aakash and decides to hold back until collecting proves against him. While collecting the proves she rekindles her old friendship with Satyendra. Soon Suhana, a nurse and another former victim of being used by Aakash for his sexual needs comes to the picture and exposes Aakash in front of his family and colleagues. An enraged Aakash locks Mitti and Chirag but his mother helps them escape. However he kidnaps Chirag which leads to Chirag's resentment towards him after the rescue.

Soon he tries to kill Naina twice but his plans fail after Naina is first shifted to Satyendra's home and then Suhana's home for her safety. When Naina goes into a pre-mature labour he decides to kill Naina and Mitti for once and all but his scheme gets overheard by his brother Rohit. Naina succumbs to her injuries but not before delivering her daughter who gets adopted by Mitti who survives but miscarries. Mitti names the baby Sampoorna and decides to hide about her existence which is known only to her, Suhana and Satyendra until the investigation against Aakash reopens.

When the investigation reopens, Prithvi burdened by guilt, confesses to his crimes in court and exposes Aakash while Rohit too exposes him and court orders the DNA test of Sampoorna and Aakash on Mitti's insistence. Aakash's paternity gets proven and he gets lifetime imprisonment thus prevailing Naina her justice. In the final chapter Mitti decides to raise her both children Chirag and Sampoorna as a proud mother and make them strong enough to fight for right and live their lives with dignity.

== Cast ==
=== Main ===
- Sandipta Sen as Mitti Kapoor: Akash's ex-wife; Balbir and Gublinder's daughter; Vishal's sister; Chirag's mother; Sampoorna's step-mother
- Aham Sharma as Dr. Akash Malhotra: A prisoner and sex offender; Mitti's ex-husband; Sukhdev and Kuljeet's son; Rohit's brother; Chirag and Sampoorna's father
- Vishal Aditya Singh as SI Satyendra "Sattu" Prasad Lohar
- Riyaa Kapoor as Dr. Naina Singh: Aakash's victim, Sampoorna's mother(dead)

=== Recurring ===
- Kuku Diwan as Sukhdev Malhotra: Aakash's father
- Hardeep Kaur as Kuljeet Malhotra: Aakash's mother
- Saumil Chawla as Chirag Kapoor (previously Malhotra): Mitti and Aakash's son
- Ramandeep Singh Sur as Rohit Malhotra: Aakash's brother
- Maninder Gill as Smita Malhotra: Rohit's wife
- Kristy Goyal as Meher Malhotra: Rohit and Smita's daughter
- Sarbjeet Singh Myan as Balbir Kapoor: Mitti's father
- Preet Kirann as Gulbinder Kapoor: Mitti's mother
- Milan Singh Rana as Vishal Kapoor: Mitti's brother
- Naviya Saini as Roshni Kapoor: Vishal's wife
- Jashan as Golu Singh: Naina's brother
- Pawan Dhiman as Gagan Singh: Naina's uncle
- Sovii Arora as Neelam Singh: Naina's aunt
- Ekta Verma as Simran Singh: Naina's cousin
- Noor Kaur as Gudiya: Mitti's best-friend
- Ashman Kumar as Sandy: Gudiya's love-interest and live-in partner
- Nancy as Rachna: Naina's best-friend
- Vishwas Saraf as Dr. Prithvi Singh Bedi: Aakash's trusted junior
- Tanya Mahajan as Pushpa: Mitti's trusted househelp
- Ritik Ahuja as Karan: Naina's friend
- Nikhil Baweja as Inspector Balvinder Sandhu
- Harshita Singh as Suhana: A nurse who also became a victim to Aakash prior to Naina
- unknown as baby Sampoorna Singh: Naina and Aakash's daughter, Mitti's adoptive daughter

== Production ==
=== Casting ===
Kuku Diwan were confirmed to play Sukhdev Malhotra.
