= Birangana (TV series) =

2025 web series

Birangana is a Bengali Psychological thriller web series directed by Nirjhar Mitra. This film was released on the Bengali language OTT platform Hoichoi on 25 July 2025. This is the Tollywood debut of popular social media influencer Niranjan Mondal.

== Plot ==
A serial killer is targeting newly married women, abducting and murdering them, creates the chaos in Kolkata. Chitra Basu a fearless and ambitious police officer, investigates the case. She determines to prove herself in a patriarchal police system.

== Cast ==
- Sandipta Sen as Chitra Basu
- Niranjan Mondal as Chirayu Talukdar
- Pratik Dutta
- Aditya Sengupta
