= Dhrubor Aschorjo Jibon =

Indian Bengali-language feature film

- Directed by: Abhijit Chowdhury
- Written by: Abhijit Chowdhury
- Produced by: Fourth Floor Entertainment, Concept Cube(Co Producer)
- Starring: Rishav Basu, Ritwika Pal, Korak Samanta, Anandarupa Chakraborty
- Cinematography: Arnab Laha
- Edited by: Abhijit Chowdhury
- Music by: Pralay Sarkar
- Release date: December 2024 (Kolkata Film Festival)
- Country: India
- Language: Bengali
- Budget: 20 Lakhs
- Box office: 70 Lakhs

Dhrubor Aschorjo Jibon (transl. The Strange Life of Dhurbo) is a 2025 Indian Bengali-language feature film written and directed by Abhijit Chowdhury and presented by Aniruddha Roy Chowdhury. The film blends elements of crime drama and science fiction, focusing on themes such as moral conflict, fate, and the socio-political influences on personal decisions. Cinematographer and Production Designer Arnab Laha was praised for his work in visually recreating the artistic styles of the four renowned painters—Jamini Roy, Gaganendranath Tagore, Bikash Bhattacharjee, and Benode Behari Mukherjee—whose distinct artistic philosophies inspired the film’s chapters.

The film premiered at the Kolkata International Film Festival and won the Best Film (Bengali Panorama) award. It won the Best Director Award at the Atlanta Indian Film Festival and Best Film at the NABC Film Festival.

== Plot ==
The story follows Dhrubo, a man whose life takes a dramatic turn after a chance encounter with a crime. Each decision he makes leads to a branching timeline, creating alternate versions of his life. As Dhrubo navigates these parallel realities, the film explores how ethical dilemmas and social structures shape individual destiny. The narrative structure blends speculative fiction with emotional realism to raise questions about fate and free will.

== Cast ==
- Rishav Basu as Dhrubo
- Ritwika Pal as Rimi
- Korak Samanta as Nandi
- Anandarupa Chakraborty as Firoza
- Senjuti Mukherjee as Dhrubo's mother
- Badshah Moitra
- Sudip Mukherjee
- Debesh Chattopadhyay
- Judhajit Sarkar
- Deepak Haldar

== Production ==
The film was produced by Fourth Floor Entertainment and co-produced by Concept Cube. Principal photography took place across various locations in and around Kolkata. The visual style of the film was inspired by four renowned Bengali artists—Jamini Roy, Gaganendranath Tagore, Bikash Bhattacharjee, and Benode Behari Mukherjee—with each chapter of the narrative reflecting their distinct artistic philosophies. Principal photography lasted approximately 12 days and involved 40–50 extras along with a crew of about 30 members. Post-production took approximately one year to complete.

== Reception ==
- Dhrubor Aschorjo Jibon* received positive critical reception for its narrative innovation, performances, and visual treatment. Critics praised the film’s exploration of alternate realities and its commentary on societal structures. The interval sequence, visually inspired by Gaganendranath Tagore’s painting *Bishorjon*, was noted for its striking visual composition.
- The Lighting, Composition & Production Design by Arnab Laha, played a key role in achieving the visual tone of Gaganendranath Tagore’s painting Bisorjon. The scene was filmed on a real location near the Sealdah area, chosen for its architectural resemblance to the setting depicted in the artwork.

== Awards ==
- Best Film (Bengali Panorama) – Kolkata International Film Festival
- Best Director – Atlanta Indian Film Festival
- Best Film – NABC Film Festival

== Soundtrack ==
The film’s music was composed by Pralay Sarkar. The final sequence features a song rendered by Timir Biswas, which received particular acclaim for its emotional resonance.
