= Joydeep Mukherjee (director) =

Indian film director, actor and writer

- Born: 9 June
- Occupations: Director; Screenwriter; Actor
- Years active: 2008–present
- Notable work: Byomkesh; The Eken; Eken Babu series; Shikari; Nabab; Chalbaaz; Bhaijaan Elo Re; The Eken: Ruddhaswas Rajasthan; The Eken: Benaras e Bibhishika

Joydeep Mukherjee is an Indian film director, actor and writer primarily associated with Bengali Film Industry. He made his directorial debut with the daily soap Ekhane Aakash Neel. He gained recognition after directing multiple India-Bangladesh joint ventures including Shikari (2016) and Nabab (2017). He gained further recognition after directing all the seasons of Eken Babu series Season 6 onwards. He is best known for directing the Ekenbabu theatrical films - The Eken (2022), The Eken: Ruddhaswas Rajasthan (2023) and The Eken: Benaras e Bibhishika (2025).

== Career ==
In 2008, Joydeep started his career with directed television drama serial. Then he directed two more dramas. In 2016, he debuted as a film director with the project of Indo-Bangla joint production thriller drama film Shikari share with Zakir Hossain Simanto featuring Shakib Khan and Srabanti Chatterjee, which became the highest-grossing Bengali film of 2016.

== Filmography ==
Key
†	Denotes films that have not yet been released

Year	Film	Director	Screenwriter	Actor	Language	Notes	Ref.
2015	Bhengchi	No	No	Yes	Bengali	Marked his feature film debut	
2016	Shikari	Yes	No	No	Bengali	Indo-Bangladesh joint production; Marked his feature film directorial debut; Co-directed with Zakir Hossain Simanto	
2016	Amoler Cabin	No	No	Yes	Bengali		
2017	Nabab	Yes	Yes	No	Bengali	Indo-Bangladesh joint production; Co-directed with Abdul Aziz	
2018	Chalbaaz	Yes	No	No	Bengali		
2018	Bhaijaan Elo Re	Yes	Yes	No	Bengali		
2020	Detective	Yes	Yes	No	Bengali	Directly released on the OTT platform Hoichoi	
2021	F.I.R No. 339/07/06	Yes	Yes	No	Bengali	Released on ZEE5 12 days after the theatrical release	
2021	Golondaaj	No	No	Yes	Bengali		
2021	Anusandhan	No	No	Yes	Bengali		
2021	Bikkhov	No	No	Yes	Bengali		
2022	The Eken	Yes	No	No	Bengali		
2022	Lokkhi Chele	No	No	Yes	Bengali		
2023	Ardhangini	No	No	Yes	Bengali		
2023	The Eken: Ruddhaswas Rajasthan	Yes	No	No	Bengali		
2025	The Eken: Benaras E Bibhishika	Yes	No	No	Bengali		
2025	Oporichito	Yes	No	No	Bengali		
2026	The Eken: Kerala-e Kurukshetra †	Yes	No	No	Bengali		

== Web series ==
Year	Web series	Director	Screenwriter	Actor	OTT Platform	Notes	Ref.
2019	Sharate Aaj	No	No	Yes	ZEE5	Marked his OTT acting debut	
2023	Shikarpur	No	No	Yes	ZEE5		
2023	Chhotolok	No	No	Yes	ZEE5		
2024	Kaantaye Kaantaye	Yes	No	No	ZEE5	Marked his OTT directorial debut	
2024	Advocate Achinta Aich	Yes	No	No	Hoichoi		
2025	Advocate Achinta Aich 2	Yes	No	No	Hoichoi		
2025	Nishir Daak	Yes	No	No	Hoichoi		
2026	Queens	No	No	Yes	Hoichoi		
2026	Advocate Achinta Aich 3	Yes	No	No	Hoichoi		
2026	Taarkata	No	No	Yes	ZEE5		

== Television ==
Year	Soap opera	Director	Story writer	Actor	Notes	Ref.
2008	Ekhane Aakash Neel	Yes			Debuted in television series	
2010	Gaaner Oparey	Yes	No			
2014	Byomkesh	Yes				
