= Falaque Rashid Roy =

Indian actress

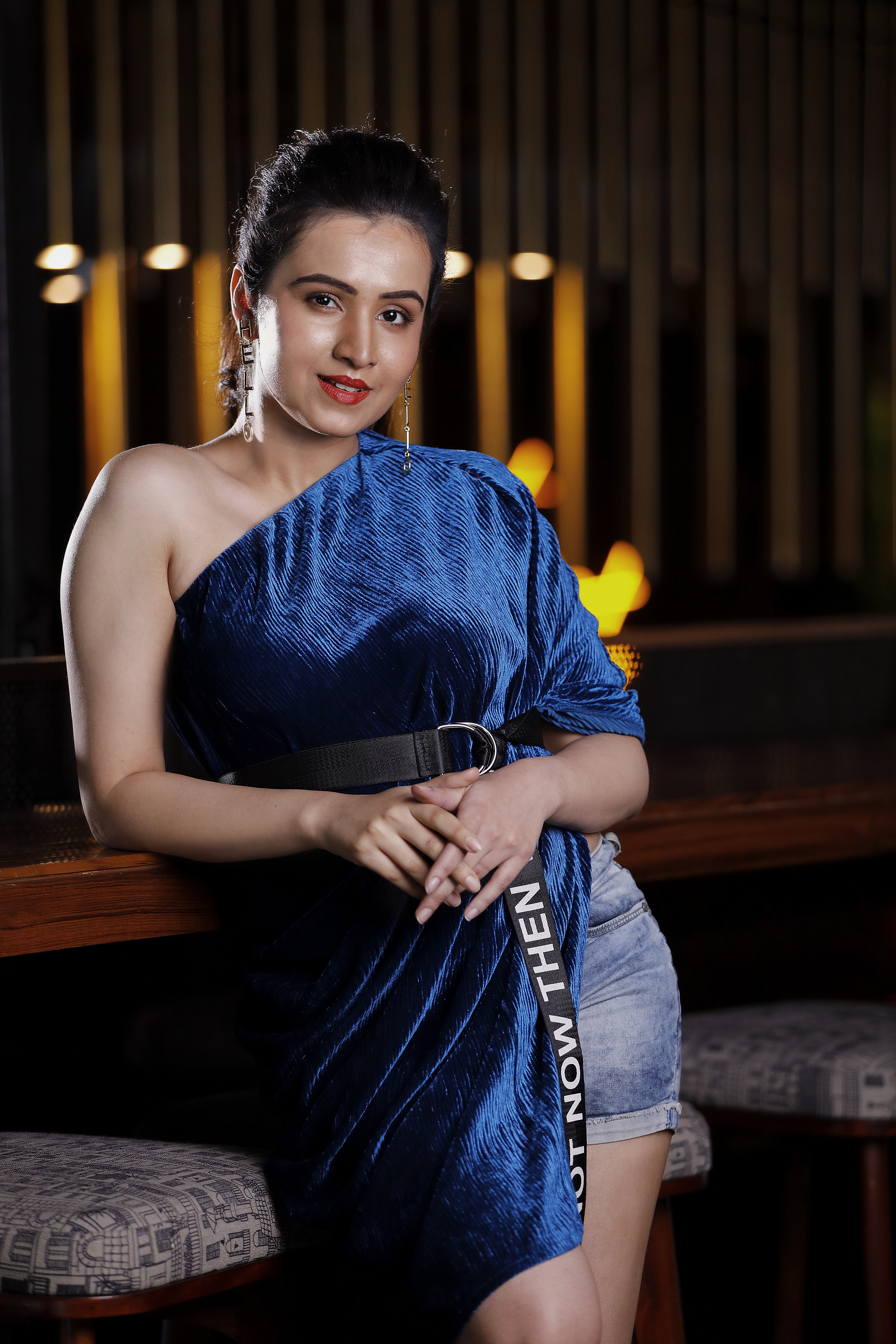
- Rashid Roy in 2021
- Born: Falaque Rashid; Kolkata, India
- Occupations: Actress, model
- Spouse: Neil Roy

Falaque Rashid Roy (née Rashid) is an Indian film actress who works in Bengali language films. She made her debut in 2019 film Khwaishein – The Desires of the Lost, and gained wider public recognition with her roles in Parineeta (2019), F.I.R No. 339/07/06 (2021) and Maayakumari (2023).

== Early life and family ==
Rashid Roy was born in Kolkata, West Bengal.

She is married to Neil Roy.

== Career ==
Rashid Roy started her career with the film Khwaishein - The Desires of the Lost as a lead role. In 2019 she played an important role in the film Parineeta.

== Filmography ==
Year	Film	Role	Notes
2019	Khwaishein – The Desires of the Lost		
2019	Parineeta	Sayantika Sen	
2020	Nirbandhamer Jora Khun	Riyanka	
2021	F.I.R	Shiuli	
2023	Dear Diary (2022 film)		
2024	Maayakumari		
