= Olokkhis in Goa (TV series) =

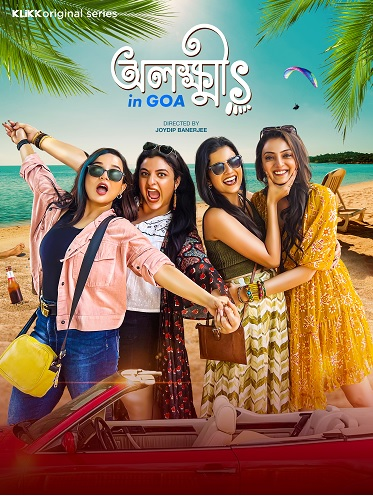
- Genre: Comedy
- Written by: Joydip Banerjee and Soumit Deb
- Directed by: Joydip Banerjee
- Starring: Anuradha Mukherjee, Priyanka Bhattacharjee, Avery Singha Roy, Priyanka Mondal
- Country of origin: India
- Original language: Bengali
- No. of seasons: 1
- No. of episodes: 5

Production
- Producer: Santanu Chatterjee

Original release
- Network: Klikk
- Release: 22 January 2023

Olokkhis in Goa is a 2023 Bengali language comedy streaming television series. Loosely based on Rough Night, it was written and directed by Joydip Banerjee and produced by Santanu Chatterjee.

The main cast of the series is Anuradha Mukherjee, Priyanka Bhattacharjee, Avery Singha Roy, Priyanka Mondal. OIG was released on 22 January 2023 on Klikk OTT platform.

== Plot ==
Living the Bollywood dream, Hoi, Ronita, Barsha, and Titash take a holiday to Goa as Titash's bachelorette. The plot involves the women solving their issues with their friendships and dynamics. The tale of four companions who have never experienced true wealth or tranquility and who appear to bring their bad luck with them everywhere they go is told in Olokkhis in Goa.

== Cast ==
- Anuradha Mukherjee as Ranita (IG)
- Priyanka Bhattacharjee as Hoi (IG)
- Avery Singha Roy as Barsha (IG)
- Priyanka Mondal as Titas (IG)
