= Astey Ladies =

Indian web series

- Trailer poster
- Genre: Thriller
- Directed by: Abhijit Chowdhury
- Country of origin: India
- Original language: Bengali
- No. of seasons: 1
- No. of episodes: 9

Production
- Production company: Star Entertainment Studio

Original release
- Release: 14 March 2019

Astey Ladies is a Bengali drama web series streaming on the OTT platform hoichoi starting on March 14, 2019. Hoichoi also released the dubbed version of the web series named Salon De Paris. The series stars Sandipta Sen, Saayoni Ghosh and Indrasish Roy as the central characters.

== Plot ==
Astey Ladies revolves around the lives of three women Megha, Tani & Lima whose lives depend on their beauty and styling parlour, Salon De Paris. Megha is a former school teacher and her husband does not believe in her dreams, Tani is a fighter. And Lima is youthful and innocent. Financial issues cause them to do a jewelry heist.

== Cast ==
- Sandipta Sen as Megha Ganguly
- Saayoni Ghosh as Tani
- Madhurima Ghosh as Lima
- Saurav Das as Kaushik Majumdar
- Indrasish Roy as Subham Ganguly
- Dipankar De as Samar Poddar
- Krishnendu Dewanji as Anubhab Sarkar

== Episodes ==
Series	Episodes	Originally released
1	9	14 March 2019

=== Season 1 (2019) ===
The Series started streaming from 14 March 2019 with nine episodes.

No.	Title	Directed by	Original release date
1	"The Uninvited Guest"	Abhijit Chowdhury	14 March 2019
2	"Salon de Paris"	Abhijit Chowdhury	14 March 2019
3	"The Mission Begins"	Abhijit Chowdhury	14 March 2019
4	"The Robbery"	Abhijit Chowdhury	14 March 2019
5	"The Apartment"	Abhijit Chowdhury	14 March 2019
6	"The Makeover Plan"	Abhijit Chowdhury	14 March 2019
7	"The Diamond Heist"	Abhijit Chowdhury	14 March 2019
8	"The Lion's Den"	Abhijit Chowdhury	14 March 2019
9	"The Final Cut"	Abhijit Chowdhury	14 March 2019
