= Sandipta Sen =

Bengali actress (born 1986)

- Born: Sandipta Sen; 27 August 1986 (age 40); Kolkata, West Bengal, India
- Other names: Rinky, Sandy, Maman
- Occupations: Actor; Dancer; Model; Psychologist
- Years active: 2008–present
- Notable work: Durga; Pratidaan; Karunamoyee Rani Rashmoni
- Spouse: Soumya Mukherjee (m. 2024)

Sandipta Sen (born 27 August 1986) is an Indian Bengali actress best known for her works in the Bengali television industry. She primarily works in Bengali soap operas and web series besides a few film appearances. In 2009 and 2010, she was awarded the Tele Shamman Award for her debut television soap Durga. In 2014, 2015 and 2017, she was awarded the Tele Academy Award for the Best Actress.

== Early life and education ==
Sen completed her graduation in Psychology Honours from Asutosh College, Kolkata and completed her Master's degree in Applied Psychology from Rajabazar Science College under the Calcutta University.

== Filmography ==
=== Film ===
Key
†	Denotes films that have not yet been released

Year	Film	Role	Language	Notes	Ref.
2021	Ekannoborti	Sandipta	Bengali	Film debut	
2023	The Eken: Ruddhaswas Rajasthan	Rajyashree	Bengali		
2025	Aapish (The Office)	Joyeeta	Bengali		
2025	'Bhuto'Purbo	Tilottoma	Bengali		

=== Television ===
Year	Title	Role	Language	Channel	Note	Ref.
2008–2010	Durga	Durga Roychowdhury	Bengali	Star Jalsa	Television debut	
2011–2013	Tapur Tupur	Tapur Chowdhury	Bengali	Star Jalsa		
2014–2016	Tumi Asbe Bole	Nandini Debroy	Bengali	Star Jalsa		
2017–2018	Pratidaan	Shimul Bosu Sen / "Sheuli Phool"	Bengali	Star Jalsa		
2019	Thakumar Jhuli	Dukhu	Bengali	Star Jalsa	Episodic Role	
2019	Durga Durgeshwari	Durga RoyChowdhury	Bengali	Star Jalsa	Special Appearance	
2019–2020	Aye Khuku Aye	Rani	Bengali	Sun Bangla		
2020	Lockdown Diaries: Maya Bhuban	Maya	Bengali	Zee Bangla		
2021–2022	Karunamoyee Rani Rashmoni	Saradamoni	Bengali	Zee Bangla		
2023	Mithai	Guest Appearance	Bengali	Zee Bangla		
2025	Sampoorna	Mitti Kapoor Malhotra	Hindi	Star Plus	Debut in Hindi language television series	

=== Mahalaya ===
Year	Title	Role	Channel	Ref.
2009	Durga Durgotinashini, Star Jalsha Mahalaya 2009	Devi Mahisasurmardini	Star Jalsa	
2010	Durga Durgotinashini, Star Jalsha Mahalaya 2010	Devi Sati	Star Jalsa	
2012	Mahisasurmardini, Star Jalsha Mahalaya 2012	Dance Performance	Star Jalsa	
2013	Durgotinashini Durga, Star Jalsha Mahalaya 2013	Dance Performance	Star Jalsa	
2015	Akal Bodhon, Star Jalsha Mahalaya 2015	Devi Parvati, Devi Mahisasurmardini, Devi Mahamaya	Star Jalsa	
2017	Jagat Janani Durga, Star Jalsha Mahalaya 2017	Devi Mahisasurmardini"	Star Jalsa	
2023	Ya Devi Sarbabhutesu, Star Jalsha Mahalaya 2023	Dance Performance	Star Jalsa	
2024	Ranong Dehi, Star Jalsha Mahalaya 2024	Devi Parvati and Durgamnashini	Star Jalsa	

=== Web series ===
Key
†	Denotes films that have not yet been released

Year	Title	Role	Language	Platform	Notes	Ref.
2019	Astey Ladies	Megha Ganguly	Bengali	Hoichoi		
2021	Murder in the Hills	Dr. Neema Pradhan	Bengali	Hoichoi		
2022	Bodhon	Raka Sen	Bengali	Hoichoi		
2023	Shikarpur	Chumki Biswas	Bengali	ZEE5		
2023	Noshtoneer	Aparna Gangopadhyay	Bengali	Hoichoi		
2025	Birangana	Chitra Basu	Bengali	Hoichoi		

== Awards ==
Year	Award	Category	Film/TV show	Character	Result
2009	Tele Samman Awards	Best Actress	Durga	Durga Roychowdhury	Won
2010	Tele Samman Awards	Best Actress	Durga	Durga Roychowdhury	Won
2010	Kalakar Awards	Best Actress	Durga	Durga Roychowdhury	Won
2014	Telly Academy Awards	Best Actress	Tapur Tupur	Tapur	Won
2015	Telly Academy Awards	Best Actress	Tumi Asbe Bole	Nandini	Won
2015	Star Jalsha Parivar Awards	Priyo Bouma	Tumi Asbe Bole	Nandini	Won
2015	Star Jalsha Parivar Awards	Cholo Paltai Award	Tumi Asbe Bole	Nandini	Won
2017	Telly Academy Awards	Best Actress	Pratidaan	Shimul	Won
2022	Bengal Icon Awards 2022	Best Actress	Bodhon	Raka Sen	Won
2024	OTT Samman	Best Actress in a Leading Role	Bodhon 2	Raka Sen	Won

== Reality shows ==
Title	Role	Language	Channel
Rannaghar	Guest	Bengali	Zee Bangla
Didi No. 1	Participant, Guest	Bengali	Zee Bangla
Dadagiri Unlimited	Participant	Bengali	Zee Bangla
Superstar Parivaar	Participant	Bengali	Star Jalsha
Dance Dance Junior	Performer	Bengali	Star Jalsha
