= Sujan Dasgupta =

Indian writer (1934–2009)

- সুজন দাশগুপ্ত
- Born: 1942; Calcutta, Bengal Presidency, British India
- Died: 18 January 2023 (aged 80–81); Survey Park, Kolkata, West Bengal, India
- Education: Jadavpur University University of Cincinnati
- Occupations: Writer; professor; researcher
- Spouse: Shamita Dasgupta
- Children: Sayantani Dasgupta
- Writing career
- Notable works: Research at Bell Labs, Eken Babu

Sujan Dasgupta (1942 – 18 January 2023) was an Indian origin American writer and professor. Outside Academia, he was famous for his fictional Bengali detective character series Ekenbabu. The first story of Ekenbabu series to be published was Manhattane Moonstone in 1991 in Anandamela magazine.

== Early Life ==
Sujan Dasgupta was born in 1942 in Calcutta (now Kolkata), India. He completed his early education in the city before enrolling at Jadavpur University, where he earned a degree in engineering. After completing his studies in India, Dasgupta moved to the United States in the 1960s to pursue higher education. He later received a Ph.D. in Mechanical Engineering from the University of Cincinnati around 1970. Following his academic pursuits, Dasgupta joined Bell Labs in the United States, a leading research and development institution.

== Eken Babu Stories ==
- Manhattane Moonstone
- Manhattane Manhunt
- Dhaka Rahasyo Unmochito
- Ekenbabu O Keyadidi
- Sankhayar Sanket
- Shanti Niketon E Ashanti
- Harappar Shilalipi
- Spoken English Murder mystery
- Melaben Tini Melaben
- Karmaphal
- Besuro Behalar Porer Kahini
- Manhattan e Madman
- Houseboat Nikhoj
- Asol Khunir Sondhane
- Ideal Jewelry
- Woodbridge Shohore
- Bhoyonkor Chithi
- Khuner Aage Khuni Khoja
- Columbus-ey Ekenbabu
- Priceless Buddha
- Manhattane Mystery Murder
- Nrityoshilpir Mrityu Tadonte Ekenbabu
- Eken Babu O Barman Barir Rahsya
- Puroshkar Panch Hazar Dollar
- Anguler Chhaap
- New Hope Diamonds
- Bouncy Ball
- Shosommane Biday
- Soundorya Boud
- Diamond For Ever
- Chadma Beshi Somoy
- Parswo Choritre Eken Babu
- Harano Prapti

== Credits ==
Film adaptations
Year	Title	Based on
2022	The Eken	"Manhattaner Madman"
2023	The Eken: Ruddhaswas Rajasthan	"osommane Bidai"
2025	The Eken: Benaras e Bibhishika	"Ideal Jewellery"

Eken Babu web series seasons
Year	Season Title	Story based on	Director
2018	Season 1	"Manhattane Moonstone"	Anirban Mallik
2018	Season 2	"Manhattan ey Man hunt"	Anupam Hari
2019	Season 3	"Dhaka Rahasyo Unmochito"	Abhijit Chowdhury
2020	Season 4	"Ekenbabu O Barman Bari Rahasya"	Joydip Mukherjee & Surajit Chatterjee
2021	Season 5	"Sankhyar Sanket"	Anirban Mallik
2022	Season 6	"Asol Khunir Sondhane"	Joydip Mukherjee
2023	Season 7	"Khuner Age Khuni Khoja"	Joydeep Mukherjee
2025	Season 8	"Nrityoshilpir Mrityu Tadonte Ekenbabu"	Joydip Mukherjee
2026	Season 9	"Bhoyonkor Chithi"	Joydeep Mukherjee
