= Shikarpur (TV series) =

Indian Bengali-language web-series

- Promotional poster for Shikarpur
- Genre: Crime Thriller
- Created by: Shadow Films
- Written by: Nirjhar Mitra; Nilanjan Chakraborty; Shayak Roy
- Directed by: Nirjhar Mitra
- Presented by: Kaushik Ganguly
- Starring: Ankush Hazra; Kaushik Ganguly; Sandipta Sen
- Country of origin: India
- Original language: Bengali
- No. of episodes: 9

Production
- Producer: Shyam Sundar Dey
- Production company: Shadow Films

Original release
- Network: ZEE5
- Release: 6 January 2023

Shikarpur is an Indian Bengali-language crime thriller streaming television series starring Ankush Hazra, Kaushik Ganguly and Sandipta Sen. Kaushik Ganguly is also the creative presenter of this series. The series is directed by Nirjhar Mitra. The sound designer for this series are dibbyo and silajit chakraborty. It is premiered on ZEE5 on 6 January 2023.

== Plot ==
The story is about Keshto played by Ankush Hazra, a photographer who aspires to be a detective like his guru Dindayal Biswas played by Kaushik Ganguly. Set in a sleepy town in north Bengal, the series sees Keshto trying to solve a series of murders that are rumoured to have been caused by a ghost. The web series ended on an emotional note, and featured several touching relationships, including the bond between a father and daughter, played by Kaushik Ganguly and Sandipta Sen and the strained relationship between Kesto and Biman, played by Debasish Mondal.

== Cast ==
- Ankush Hazra as Keshto: A photographer who wants to be a famous detective.
- Kaushik Ganguly as Dindayal Biswas: Chumki's father; Former detective of Shikarpur; Keshto's Ustaad.
- Sandipta Sen as Chumki Biswas: Keshto's love interest; Dindayal's daughter.
- Debasish Mondal as Biman Majhi: A police officer.
- Korak Samanta as Boltu Barman: Keshto's assistant.
- Sayan Ghosh as David Mayajal: A magician.
- Debesh Roy Chowdhury as Ramprakash Ghosh.
- Dola Chakraborty as Chumki's mother; Dindayal's wife.
- Krishnendu Dewanji as Manik Ghosh.

== Production ==
Shikarpur went into production in early 2022. It was announced as a part of ZEE5's future content slate in May 2022.

== Marketing ==
The trailer of Shikarpur was released on 22 December 2022.

== Reception ==
The Times Of India in its review said, "This series is a promising beginning to what looks like a multi-season series," and rated it 3.5 out of 5. Binged.com rated the series 6/10, liking the overall story of the series and the premise. OTTPlay in its review complimented the acting of Ganguly and Mondal.
