= Abhijit Chowdhury =

Indian filmmaker

- Education: Indian Institute of Engineering, Science and Technology, Shibpur
- Occupations: Film Director; Script Writer; Fulbright Scholar

Abhijit Chowdhury is a Kolkata, India-based writer and director, recognized for his contributions to Bengali cinema and web series. His notable works include The Strange Life of Dhrubo,Manbhanjan, Astey Ladies, Johny Bonny, Dwitiyo Ripu, and Eken Babu O Dhaka Rahasya. These have been praised for their storytelling and have garnered both critical and popular acclaim, appealing to a diverse audience. Several of his works have been featured at national and international film festivals.

The Strange Life of Dhrubo (Dhrubor Aschorjo Jibon) had been officially selected for the "National Competition on Bengali Panorama" at the Kolkata International Film Festival.

Chowdhury won the Best Director Award for Dhrubor Aschorjo Jibon (The Strange Life of Dhrubo) in the "Atlanta Indian Film Festival 2024". Dhrubor Aschorjo Jibon also got Best Editing (Feature), Best Film (Feature), Best Actor (Feature) in "NABC 2024 Independent Film Festival 2024". The film was also officially selected at "DC South Asian Film Festival 2024".

Aste Ladies is a web series streaming in Hoichoi featuring three ladies in the lead role played by Sandipta Sen, Saayoni Ghosh and Madhurima Ghosh. Abhijit wrote and directed this web series containing 9 episodes.

Manbhanjan is a web series based on a short story of Rabindranath Tagore. It was released on Hoichoi on 14 June 2019. Sohini Sarkar, Anirban Bhattacharya and Amrita Chattopadhyay played the leading roles. Abhijit earned critical success for his web series Aste Ladies and Manbhanjan.

Chowdhury created and directed Johny Bonny, a suspense drama series, starring Debasish Mondal, Swastika Dutta, Ankit Majumder, Kamaleshwar Mukherjee, and others which streaming on Klikk.

== Early life and background ==
Abhijit graduated from Indian Institute of Engineering Science and Technology, Shibpur. He left his job as a software engineer to pursue his Film-making career.

== Filmography ==
=== Films ===
Year	Title	Director	Writer
2015	Dwitiyo Ripu (Feature)	Yes	Yes
2018	Mithye (Short)	Yes	Yes
2025	Dhrubor Aschorjo Jibon (The Strange Life of Dhrubo) (Feature)	Yes	Yes

=== Web series ===
Year	Title	Director	Writer
2019	Astey Ladies	Yes	Yes
2019	Manbhanjan	Yes	
2019	Eken Babu Season 3	Yes	
2019	Bhalobasar Shohor - Paramount	Yes	
2021	Turu Love	Yes	
2021	Shubharambh	Yes	
2022	Johny Bonny	Yes	Yes
