= Durga (TV series) =

Indian soap opera

- Genre: Indian soap opera Drama; Mythology; Romance; Thriller
- Created by: Shree Venkatesh Films
- Directed by: Anupam Hari
- Creative director: Sahana
- Presented by: Shree Venkatesh Films
- Starring: Sandipta Sen; Gourab Chatterjee; Swagata Mukherjee; Payel De
- Theme music composer: Jeet Ganguly
- Composer: Jeet Ganguly
- Country of origin: India
- Original language: Bengali

Production
- Producers: Shrikant Mohta; Mahendra Soni
- Production location: Kolkata
- Running time: 22 minutes
- Production company: Shree Venkatesh Films

Original release
- Network: Star Jalsha
- Release: 8 September 2008 – 26 June 2010

Related
- Gaaner Oparey

Durga is an Indian Bengali language television soap opera that aired from 8 September 2008 to 26 June 2010 on Bengali GEC Star Jalsha. The show starred Sandipta Sen, Gourab Chatterjee and Swagata Mukherjee and Payel De in lead roles.

A spiritual sequel or a reboot of this series, Durga Durgeshwari, premiered in 2019 and ended in 2020. It starred Sampurna Mondal and Bishwarup Banerjee in the lead roles.

== Plot ==
It is the tale of the journey of a village belle and an ardent devotee of Goddess Durga, Durga (Sandipta Sen) who marries a mentally unwell heir, Rupam (Gourab Chatterjee), of an urban rich family. Rupam is held captive for several years by an evil woman Damini (Swagata Mukherjee). Damini held Rupam around the waist and captured him. However, Durga's faith in the Goddess, which is her strength helps her to cure Rupam. The Goddess (Payel De) comes to her rescue during all of Durga's challenges. Thus, Durga helps Rupam lead a normal life by defeating the foul plans of his relatives with the help of Goddess Durga.

== Cast ==
- Sandipta Sen in a dual role as
  - Durga Roy Chowdhury née Sensharma, Shibnath and Sarbojaya's daughter, Rupam's wife, Gauri's adoptive mother and an ardent devotee of Goddess Durga, Durga Chowdhury's reincarnation
  - Durga Chowdhury, daughter of the priest of Sonajhuri Durga temple, Rupnarayan's wife, Anandanarayan's mother, an ardent devotee of Goddess Durga
- Gourab Chatterjee in a dual role as
  - Rupam Roy Chowdhury, Arindam and Jayanti's son, Durga's husband, Gauri's adoptive father, a mentally unwell heir, Rupnarayan's reincarnation
  - Rupnarayan Chowdhury, Durga's husband, Anandanarayan's father, Suryanarayan and Uma's Son, Maniratna's step-son and Sulekha's nephew, a man with dual personality disorder
- Swagata Mukherjee in a dual role as
  - Damini Roy Chowdhury née Sanyal, Arijit's second wife, Titli's mother, an evil lady who killed Rupam's mother and tries to harm Rupam and Durga, Sulekha's Reincarnation
  - Sulekha Chowdhury: Suryanarayan's widowed sister, Uma and Maniratna's sister-in-law, Rupnarayan's aunt
- Payel De as Goddess Durga/ Sati/ Umasashi, she comes to protect Rupam in Durga's absence and helps Durga to fight the evil
- Ditipriya Roy as Gauri, Durga and Rupam's adoptive daughter, Child version of Goddess Durga
- Debesh Roy Chowdhury as Aniruddha Roy Chowdhury, Gayatri's husband and Damini's Sidekick
- Moyna Mukherjee in a dual role as
  - Gayatri Roy Chowdhury, Aniruddha's wife and Damini's Sidekick, Gauri's killer, Maniratna's reincarnation
  - Maniratna Chowdhury: Suryanarayan's second wife, a courtesan, Rupnarayan's step mother, Sulekha's sister-in-law
- Dr. Basudev Mukhopadhyay as Arijit Roy Chowdhury, Damini's husband and Sreerup, Arup and Titli's father
- Shiladitya Patranabis/Saptarshi Roy as Sreerup Roy Chowdhury, Ketaki's husband
- Saibal Bhattacharya as Arup Roy Chowdhury, Neela's husband
- Rajat Ganguly in a dual role as
  - Arindam Roy Chowdhury, Jayanti's husband, Rupam's father, Durga's father in law, Suryanarayan's reincarnation
  - Suryanarayan Chowdhury, Zamindar of Sonajhuri village, Suryanarayan's father, Uma and Maniratna's husband, Sulekha's brother
- Pritha Chatterjee in a dual role as
  - Jayanti Roy Chowdhury née Sanyal, Damini's cosin sister, Arindam's wife, Rupam's mother, Damini's cousin who was killed by Damini, Uma's reincarnation
  - Uma Chowdhury, Suryanarayan's wife, Rupnarayan's mother, Sulekha's sister-in-law, killed by Maniratna
- June Malia as Ketaki Roy Chowdhury, Sreerup's wife
- Rupanjana Mitra as Neela Roy Chowdhury, Arup's wife
- Debolina Dutta/ Jaymala Ganguly as Titli Roy Chowdhury, Damini and Arijit's daughter, Rupam and Durga's well wisher
- Subhrajit Dutta as Kalyan, Titli's friend and love interest
- Tina Dutta as Kumkum Roy Chowdhury, Neela and Arup's first daughter
- Sritapa Deb as Kajol Roy Chowdhury, Neela and Arup's second daughter
- Bodhisattva Majumder as Shibnath Sensharma, Durga's father
- Swagata Bose as Sarbojaya Sensharma aka Jaya, Durga's mother
- Sumanta Mukherjee as Sudarshan Choudhary, zamindar of Sonajhuri village
- Anindya Pulak Banerjee as Supriyo Choudhary, son of Sudarshan Choudhary
- Rita Dutta Chakraborty as Jogmaya aka Maya Maa, a Yogini
- Debika Mitra as Kalyani Maa, a Nun, Jayanti's Guru Maa and Durga's rescuer
- Nitya Ganguly as Kanai, servant of the Roy Chowdhury family
- Pradip Bhattacharya as Harilal, the guide in Haridwar
- Samir Biswas as Sashadhar, priest of the Durga temple in Sonajhuri village who gave the idol of Goddess to Durga
- Surangana Bandyopadhyay as the mysterious girl who handed the idol of Goddess Durga to Sashadhar asking him to present the idol to Durga
- Sudipa Basu as Monoroma Dutta, Jhumur's mother
- Nabonita Dey as Jhumur Dutta, Monoroma's daughter, the girl Damini slated to marry Rupam,
- Bimal Chakraborty as Ambika Sen, Arindam's friend, a lawyer, Durga and Rupam's well wisher
- Surojit Banerjee as Dr. Dibyendu Biswas, Rupam's doctor
- Sanjib Sarkar as Dr. Dhar, an evil doctor hired by Damini to torture Rupam
- Nandini Chatterjee as Mrs. Sarkar, Damini's friend

== Adaptations ==
Language	Title	Release date	Network(s)	Last aired	Notes
Bengali	Durga	8 September 2008	Star Jalsha	26 June 2010	Original
Kannada	Durga	7 December 2015	Star Suvarna	5 August 2017	Remake
Telugu	Durga	6 February 2017	Star Maa	10 March 2017	Dubbed from Kannada Version
Hindi	Durga – Mata Ki Chhaya	14 December 2020	Star Bharat	12 March 2021	Remake
