= The Eken: Benaras e Bibhishika =

2025 Indian Bengali action thriller film

- Theatrical release poster
- Directed by: Joydip Mukherjee
- Based on: Ideal Jewellery by Sujan Dasgupta
- Screenplay by: Padmanabha Dasgupta
- Dialogues by: Padmanabha Dasgupta
- Story by: Sujan Dasgupta
- Produced by: Shrikant Mohta; Mahendra Soni; Vishnu Mohta
- Starring: Anirban Chakrabarti; Saswata Chatterjee; Suhotra Mukhopadhyay; Somak Ghosh; Gaurav Chakrabarty; Ishaa Saha
- Cinematography: Tuban
- Edited by: Subhajit Singha
- Music by: Songs: Amlaan Chakraborty; Background score: Subhadeep Guha
- Production companies: Shree Venkatesh Films; Hoichoi Studios
- Distributed by: Shree Venkatesh Films
- Release date: 16 May 2025
- Running time: 118 minutes
- Country: India
- Language: Bengali
- Box office: ₹ 9 crore

The Eken: Benaras e Bibhishika is a 2025 Indian Bengali-language black comedy action thriller film co-written and directed by Joydip Mukherjee. Produced by Shrikant Mohta and Mahendra Soni under the banner of Shree Venkatesh Films and Hoichoi Studios, the film is based on Sujan Dasgupta's novel Ideal Jewellery, and serves as the third instalment in the Eken Babu franchise. It stars Anirban Chakrabarti, Suhotra Mukherjee and Somak Ghosh reprising their roles as Eken Babu, Bapi and Pramatha respectively, alongside Saswata Chatterjee, Gaurav Chakrabarty and Ishaa Saha in another pivotal roles.

The film was officially announced in January 2025, marking the fifth collaboration between Mukherjee and Chakrabarti. Principal photography commenced in March 2025. It was released in the theatres on 16 May 2025. It emerged as the second highest grossing Bengali film of 2025 as well as the highest grossing film of The Eken theatrical franchise.

At the end of the series Eken Babu season 9, the pre-credits scene indicated a sequel, The Eken: Keralay Kurukkhetro, which will be releasing on Durga Pujo 2026.

== Plot ==
Eken Babu, accompanied by his assistants Bapi and Pramatha, arrives in Varanasi on invitation of Subimal, the friend of Pramatha. As they navigate the city’s narrow lanes and sacred ghats, they discover clues pointing to a conspiracy to disrupt the annual Masaan Holi festival. Racing against time, they must decode hidden signals and thwart the plot before it brings chaos to the celebrations.

== Cast ==
- Anirban Chakrabarti as Ekendra Sen aka Eken Babu
- Suhotra Mukhopadhyay as Bapi
- Somak Ghosh as Pramatha
- Saswata Chatterjee as Belal Malik
- Ishaa Saha as Damini
- Gaurav Chakrabarty as Subimal
- Debesh Chattopadhyay as Bireshwar
- Rishav Basu as Samiran
- Biswanath Basu as Sukhdev
- Kaushik Hafizee as Abdul
- Swikriti Majumdar as Radhika
- Sagnik as SP of Varanasi Abdul Qadir

== Production ==
=== Development ===
The first look of the principle characters in the film were released on 18 March 2025. The official motion poster announcing the release date of the film was released on 15 April 2025, on the occasion of Pohela Boisakh. Saswata Chatterjee was roped in to play the role of Belal Malik, who is a master of disguises and play 11 disguises in the film.

=== Filming ===
The film has been majorly shot in the city of Varanasi in Uttar Pradesh while minor parts have been shot in Kolkata. The culture and tradition of Varanasi, particularly the Ghats in Varanasi by the Ganga, Holi, the vibrant alleys, paan, evening chants, sadhus and sandhya aratis have been focused upon in the cinematography.

=== Marketing ===
The teaser of the film was released on 19 April 2025. The trailer was released on 6 May 2025.

== Release ==
=== Theatrical release ===
The film was released theatrically in India on 16 May 2025 with a UA certificate.

=== Home media ===
The movie was released on the OTT platform Hoichoi in 11 July 2025.

== Reception ==
=== Box office ===
The film registered the highest opening for a Bengali film in 2025. It crossed the ₹1 crore mark in two days. At the end of 3 days, it collected est. ₹2.01 crore. It grossed over ₹2.85 crore at the end of first week. It grossed over ₹5 crore at the end of 11 days. It grossed over ₹7 crore at the end of 21 days. At the end of 36 days, it grossed over ₹9 crore.

=== Critical reception ===
Poorna Banerjee of The Times of India rated the film 3.5 out of 5 stars, praising its engaging narrative and the performances of Anirban Chakrabarti and his co-stars, while noting that some plot twists felt forced. Agnivo Niyogi of The Telegraph reviewed the film and opined "The Eken: Benaras E Bibhishika is a brisk, entertaining ride that blends suspense with comedy while paying homage to Satyajit Ray’s Joi Baba Felunath. Despite the gravity of the plot, the film never loses its breezy tone or wry humour." He praised the direction, cinematography, editing and the flamboyant performance from Saswata Chatterjee.

Anindya Sengupta reviewed the film for Sangbad Pratidin and wrote "Overall, despite having strengths and flaws, The Eken: Benaras e Bibhishika will make you ponder for a minute and make you realise that this is the best film from the series till date."

Shruti Mishra of Anandabazar Patrika rated the film 6.5/10 stars and commended the film's vibrant portrayal of Varanasi's ghats, alleys, and local flavors, drawing parallels to Satyajit Ray's Joy Baba Felunath. She appreciated the witty dialogues and the nostalgic ambiance that the film evokes. However, Mishra noted that the film's narrative leans heavily into themes of extremism and bomb plots, which, while adding complexity, might overshadow the series' characteristic light-heartedness. Overall, Mishra found The Eken: Benaras e Bibhishika to be a visually engaging experience, though it diverges from the series' original tone.
