= Shantilal O Projapoti Rohoshyo =

2019 Indian Bengali mystery-thriller film

Shantilal O Projapoti Roshoshyo
- First look poster
- Directed by: Pratim D. Gupta
- Written by: Pratim D. Gupta
- Produced by: Sanjay Agarwal
- Starring: Ritwick Chakraborty; Paoli Dam; Goutam Ghose
- Cinematography: Subhankar Bhar
- Edited by: Subhajit Singha
- Music by: Avijit Kundu
- Production company: Auroville Movies
- Distributed by: Platoon One Films
- Release date: 16 August 2019
- Running time: 103 minutes
- Country: India
- Languages: Bengali; Tamil

Shantilal O Projapoti Rohoshyo (transl. Shantilal and the butterfly mystery) is an Indian Bengali mystery-thriller film, directed by Pratim D. Gupta. The film starred Ritwick Chakraborty, Paoli Dam and Goutam Ghose in lead roles. It was released on 16 August 2019 under the banner of Platoon One Films.

== Plot ==
Shantilal, a deadbeat weather reporter of a Kolkata based newspaper, who is in his late 30s, still unmarried and lives with his mother. Glamorous actress Nandita now wants to venture into politics. While Shantilal is watching old porn film he finds body part of Nandita in a clipping of famous porn star of Padma Pictures, Miss Roshni. Being curious he starts investigation about the porn film production house, Padma Pictures in Chennai. Shantilal moves from Kolkata to Chennai to Singapore to find Roshni. But no one wants to speak about Padma Pictures.

== Cast ==
- Ritwick Chakraborty as Shantilal
- Paoli Dam as Nandita
- Goutam Ghose as editor of The Sentinel
- Akshay Kapoor as Hindol
- Srijit Mukherji as Praffula
- Ambarish Bhattacharya as Rocket Ronjon
- Shankar Chakraborty as Shantilal's friend
- Alakananda Ray as Shantilal's mother
- Chitrangada Chakraborty as Candy
- Sanghasri Sinha Mitra as Roshni

== Production ==
=== Development ===
The screenplay of the film was selected for the 2013 Indian edition of the prestigious Sundance Lab, organised by Sundance Institute, where Pratim got to discuss and dissect his script with international writers and directors like Asif Kapadia, Bill Wheeler, Joshua Marston, Carlos Cuaron and Marti Noxon. The film was titled Ink at that time.

The script was subsequently read by actor Irrfan Khan who wished to direct the film for private television channel. Pratim declined Irrfan because he wished to make the film himself.

=== Casting ===
This is the fourth collaboration of Pratim and Ritwick after Shaheb Bibi Golaam, Maacher Jhol and Ahare Mon. The film also marks the fourth collaboration between the director and Paoli Dam. They have previously worked together in Maacher Jhol, Ahare Mon and the telefilm Mirchi Malini.

=== Filming ===
Shooting for the film started in Kolkata in 2018 when the premiere of the film Guptodhoner Sandhane was used by Pratim to shoot a sequence for his film.

== Release ==
The film was released theatrically on 16 August 2019.

== Soundtrack ==
Shantilal O Projapoti Rohoshyo

Soundtrack album by Arko
- Released: 27 July 2019
- Recorded: 2019
- Genre: Feature film soundtrack
- Length: 12:03
- Label: Zee Music Company

Arko chronology
Parineeta (2019)	Shantilal O Projapoti Rohoshyo (2019)

The songs for Shantilal O Projapoti Rohoshyo have been composed by Arko and the lyrics have been penned by Arko, Ritam Sen and Pratim himself. The music rights have been acquired by Zee Music Company.

All music is composed by Arko.

Track list
No.	Title	Lyrics	Singer	Length
1.	"Shomoy"	Arko	Arko	4:23
2.	"Ekai Bhalo"	Ritam Sen	Durnibar Saha	3:25
3.	"Aleya" (Rap by: Tanmoy Saadhak)	Pratim D. Gupta, Rap by: Sayantan Chatterjee	Nikhita Gandhi	4:15
Total length:				12:03
