= Maacher Jhol (film) =

2017 Indian Bengali-language film

- Film poster
- Directed by: Pratim D. Gupta
- Written by: Pratim D. Gupta
- Screenplay by: Pratim D. Gupta
- Story by: Pratim D. Gupta
- Produced by: Sony Pictures Networks; Joy B Ganguly
- Starring: Ritwick Chakraborty; Paoli Dam; Mamata Shankar; Arjun Chakrabarty; Mithu Chakrabarty
- Cinematography: Subhankar Bhar
- Edited by: Subhajit Singha
- Music by: Anupam Roy; Avijit Kundu
- Production companies: Sony Pictures Networks; Mojo Productions
- Distributed by: SPE Films India
- Release date: 18 August 2017
- Running time: 108 minutes
- Country: India
- Language: Bengali

Maacher Jhol (transl. Fish Broth) is an Indian language Bengali-language culinary drama film produced by Sony Pictures Networks and Mojo Productions directed by Pratim D. Gupta, starring Ritwick Chakraborty, Paoli Dam and Mamata Shankar in the lead roles. It is the first Bengali food film that revolves around a Paris-based chef who comes back to Kolkata after 13 years to attend to his ailing mother.

== Plot ==
Dev D (Devdatto) is a renowned chef who quit his job as an engineer in Kolkata and moved to France train at Le Cordon Bleu in Paris. In doing so, he left behind his wife Sreela and his parents. When his mother falls ill, he returns to Kolkata after 13 years, and he must come to terms with his past.

== Cast ==
- Ritwick Chakraborty as Dev D aka Devdatto
- Mamata Shankar as Maa
- Paoli Dam as Sreela
- Arjun Chakrabarty as Palash
- Kaya Blocksage
- Sauraseni Maitra
- Sumanta Mukherjee

== Production ==
=== Development ===
Pratim D. Gupta revealed that the idea of the film came during his trip to Italy where he was surprised to find local restaurants serving the recipes of mothers and grandmothers.

He also said that it was his eagerness to work with Ritwick Chakraborty again after Shaheb Bibi Golaam resulted in conceiving a character for him - Chef Dev D.

=== Casting ===
While Pratim and Ritwick have worked together in Shaheb Bibi Golaam, the film marks the first collaboration between the director and Paoli Dam. Mamata Shankar, known to be choosy about her roles, agreed to do the film immediately after reading the script.

=== Filming ===
Shooting for the film started from March 2017.

=== Music ===
The music for Maacher Jhol is composed by Anupam Roy and the lyrics have been penned by Anupam himself. One of the songs has been written by Rabindranath Tagore with a French section written and sung by Anupam. The music rights have been acquired by Zee Music Company.
