= Naznin Hasan Chumki =

Bangladeshi television and film actress

- নাজনীন হাসান চুমকি
- Born: Chuadanga, Bangladesh
- Education: Jagannath College (now Jagannath University)
- Occupations: Actress; scriptwriter; director
- Years active: 1999–present
- Awards: National Film Awards; Meril Prothom Alo Awards

Naznin Hasan Chumki is a Bangladeshi television and film actress. She is also a scriptwriter, director and anchor. In 2006, she won the National Film Award for Best Actress for the film Ghani (2006). She is a joint general secretary of the Actors Equity.

== Early life ==
Naznin Hasan Chumki grew up in Chuadanga, in the western part of Bangladesh, before moving to the capital city of Dhaka in 1996 to attend university and pursue acting. She enrolled at Jagannath College (now Jagannath University) in night shift and threw herself into acting by day. At Jagannath College, she joined "Desh Theatre Group".

== Career ==
In 1999, Chumki made her debut on television in the play Parijat and the serial Jete Jete Abosheshe. Prior to the show's premier, Chumki says that her parents were unaware of her acting. From there, Chumki moved to films. Today, she continues doing television shows in addition to films and stage productions, as well as anchoring the program Amra Du'jon Dekhte Kemon telecast on Desh TV. She also writes scripts for teleplays.

On 28 January 2022, Chumki became a joint general secretary of the Actors Equity after receiving 500 votes.

== Filmography ==
=== Films ===
Year	Film	Director	Co-star	Notes
2004	Lalon	Tanvir Mokammel	Raisul Islam Asad, Abul Kalam Azad, Shomi Kaiser	
2006	Ghani	Kazi Morshed	Masum Aziz, Raisul Islam Asad, Arman Parvez Murad	
2013	Ekoi Britte	Kazi Morshed	Raisul Islam Asad	
2013	Putul Kotha	Rony	Joyraaj, Jayanta Chattopadhyay	released in Canada
2026	Rakkhosh	Mehedi Hassan Hridoy	Siam Ahmed, Susmita Chatterjee	

=== Dramas ===
Year	Drama	Director	Co-star	Notes
1999	Jete Jete Abosheshe			debut TV serial, aired on BTV
1999	Parijat	Ananta Heera		debut TV play, aired on BTV
2011	Nurjahan			adaptation of Imdadul Haque Milon's novel, played the role of Nurjahan's mother and aired on Channel i on Saturdays and Sundays
2011	Saat Swadagar	Syed Awalad		
2011	Bao Kurani	Bikram Khan		written by Abdul Kuddus
2011	Utsab	Rulin Rahman		written by Pantho Shahriar and aired on Baishakhi Television
2012	Binocular	Rajibul Hasan Rajib		debut as a scriptwriter
2013	Ekti Raat Otopor Nisshunnota	Naznin Hasan Chumki		Directorial debut and written by herself
2014	Uttorpurush	Jamiluddin Jamil	Hillol	TV serial written by Chumki herself and aired Sundays and Mondays
2015	Sonar Moyna Pakhi	Naznin Hasan Chumki	Sayeed Babu	TV play has been written and directed by Chumki herself
2015	Prem Priti	Naznin Hasan Chumki	Abir Mirza, Sporsia	TV play has been written and directed by Chumki herself, aired on Channel 9 on Eid-ul-Adha

== Books ==
- Binita (Story) 2020

== Awards ==
National Film Award

- Best Actress - Ghani (2006)

Meril Prothom Alo Awards

- Critics Choice Best Film Actress - Ekoi Britte (2013)
