= 2nd Filmfare Awards East =

Award ceremony for Bengali language films

- Date: 25 February 2017
- Site: Science City, Kolkata
- Hosted by: Abir Chatterjee; Jisshu Sengupta
- Official website: Filmfare Awards East 2017

Highlights
- Best Film: Cinemawala
- Best Director: Kaushik Ganguly for Cinemawala
- Best Actor: Prosenjit Chatterjee for Shankhachil
- Best Actress: Swastika Mukherjee for Shaheb Bibi Golaam
- Best Critic: Cholai
- Most awards: Shaheb Bibi Golaam (6)
- Most nominations: Shaheb Bibi Golaam (12)

Television coverage
- Network: Colors Tv Bangla

2nd Filmfare Awards East ceremony, presented by The Times Group, honored the best Bengali language Indian films of 2016.

Shaheb Bibi Golaam led the ceremony with twelve nominations, and was the most awarded film at the ceremony, with six wins including Best Actress (for Swastika Mukherjee) and Best Supporting Actor (for Ritwick Chakraborty). It was followed by Praktan and Cinemawala, with ten and eight nominations respectively. For the former, Rituparna Sengupta won Best Actress Critics' (with additional four wins), while Paran Bandopadhyay won Best Actor Critics' for the latter.

Jisshu Sengupta received dual nominations for Best Actor and Best Supporting Actor, but won neither of them.

== Ceremony ==
Held at Science City, the 2nd Filmfare Awards East had Jio as the title sponsor. Abir Chatterjee and Jisshu Sengupta co-hosted the ceremony.

== Winners and nominees ==
=== Popular Awards ===
The nominees for the 2nd Filmfare Awards East were announced on 22 February 2017.

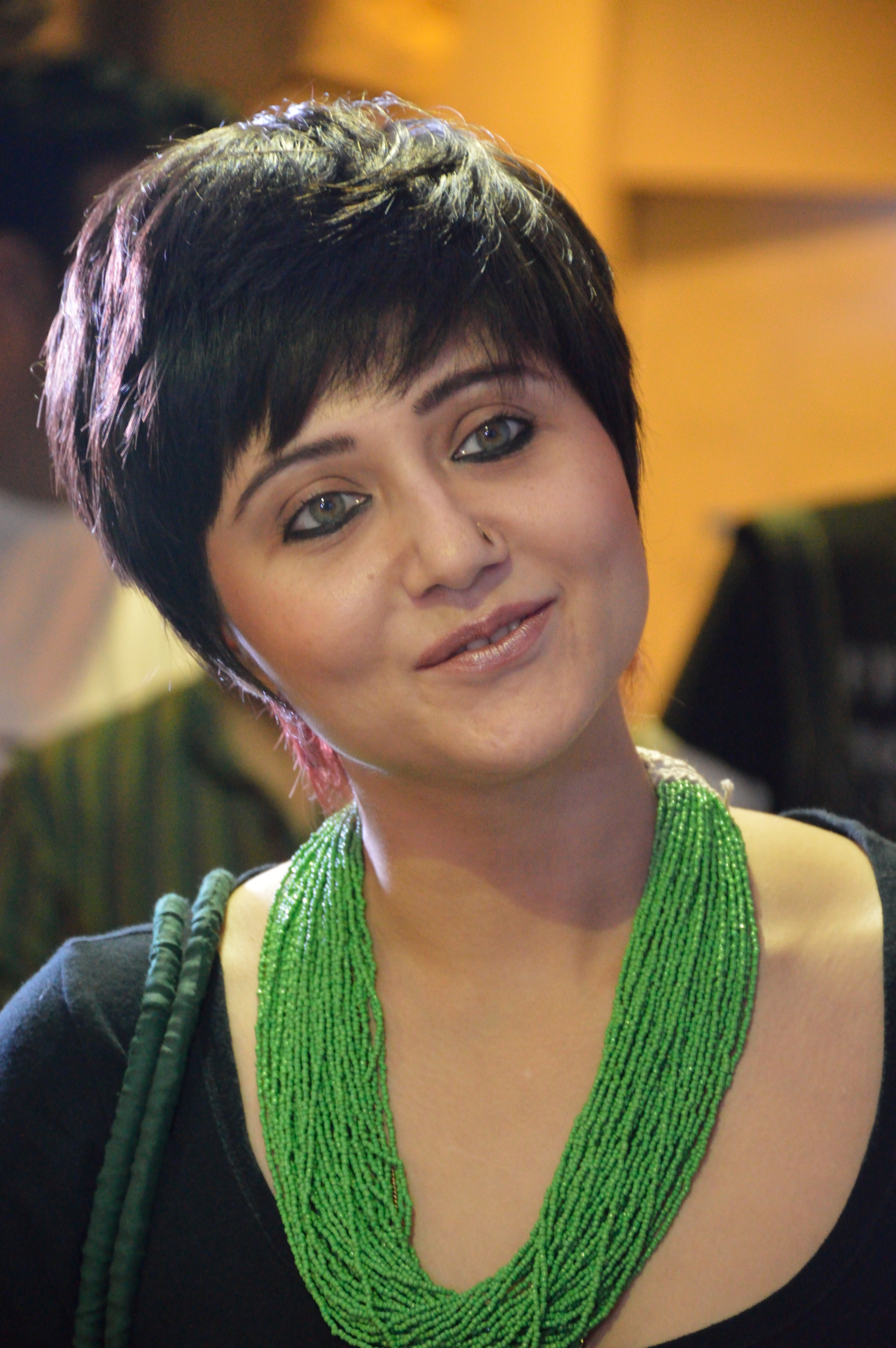
Swastika Mukherjee, Best Actress

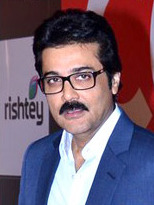
Prosenjit Chatterjee, Best Actor

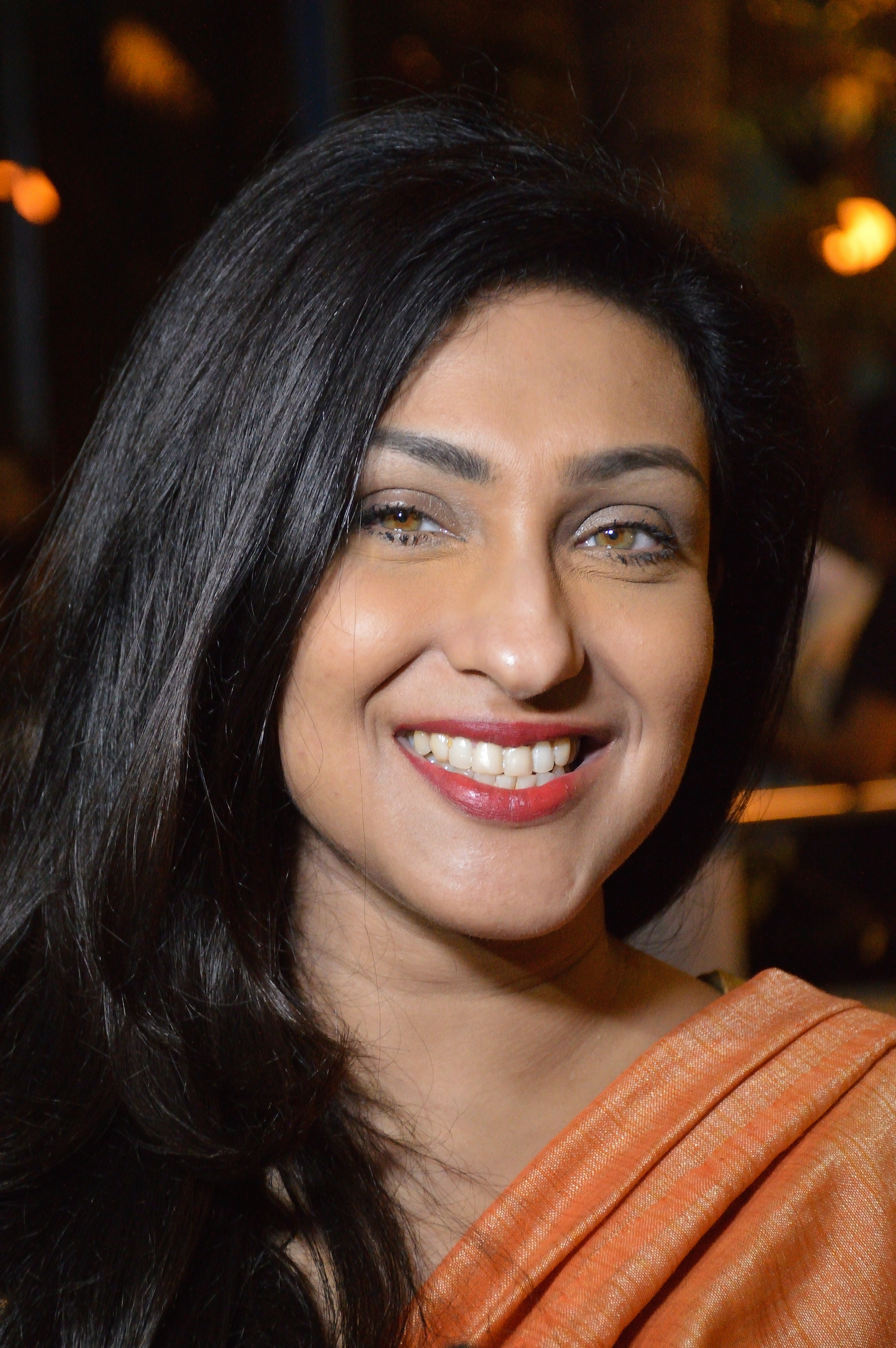
Rituparna Sengupta, Best Actress Critics

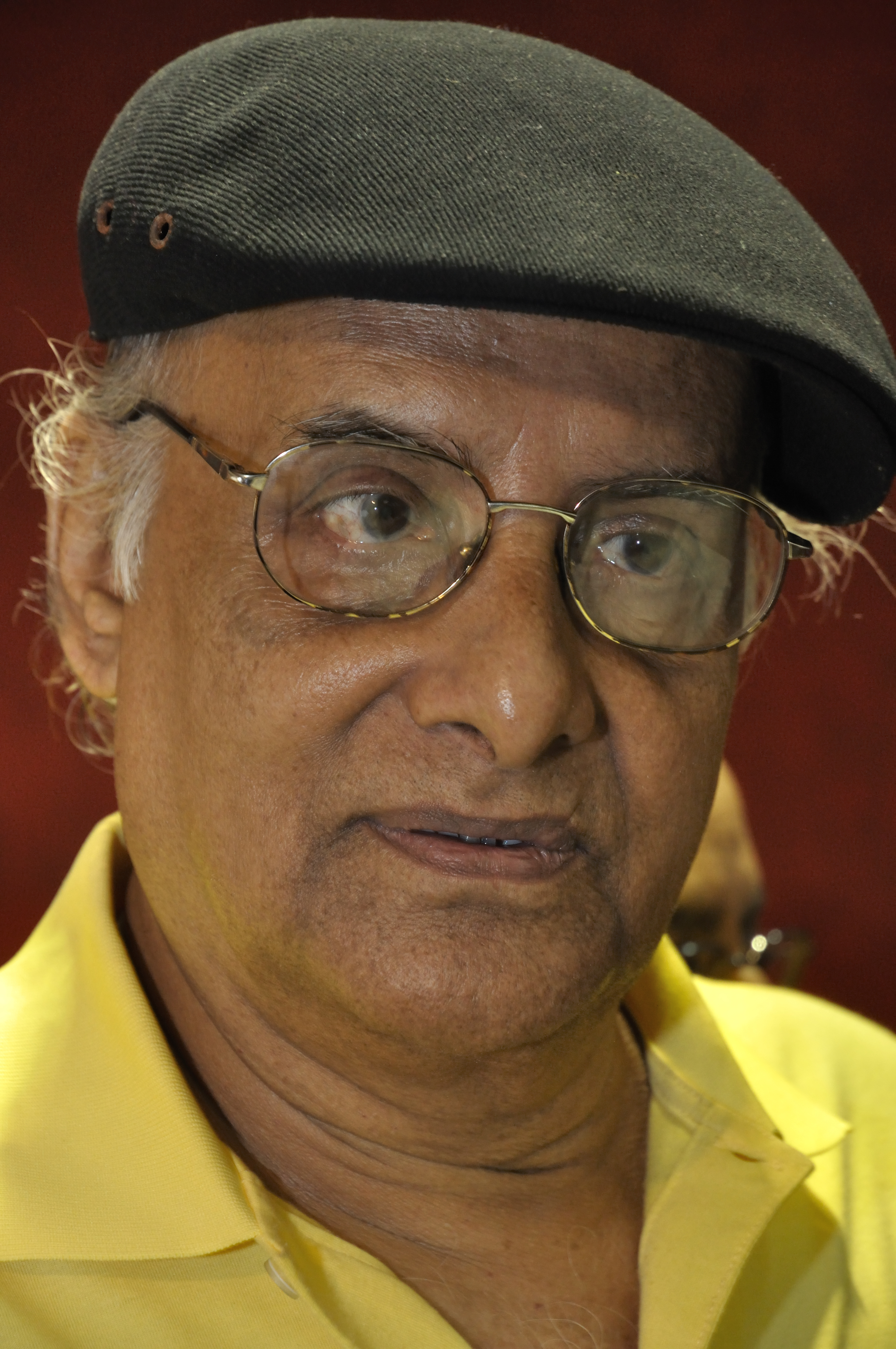
Paran Bandopadhyay, Best Actor Critics

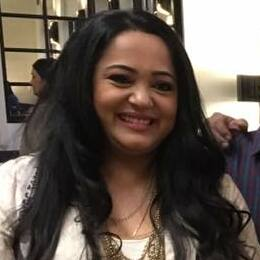
Aparajita Adhya, Best Supporting Actress

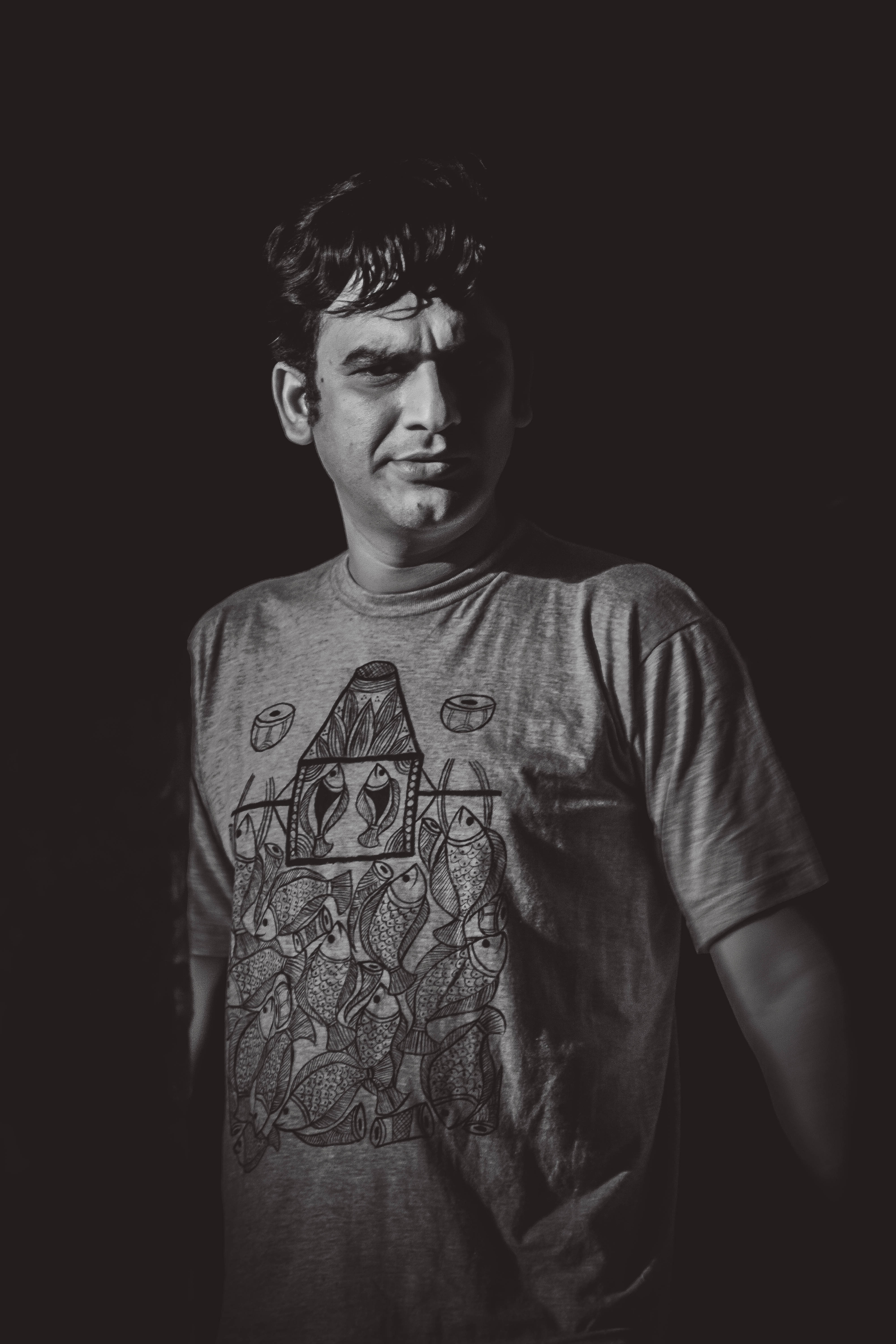
Ritwick Chakraborty, Best Supporting Actor co-winner

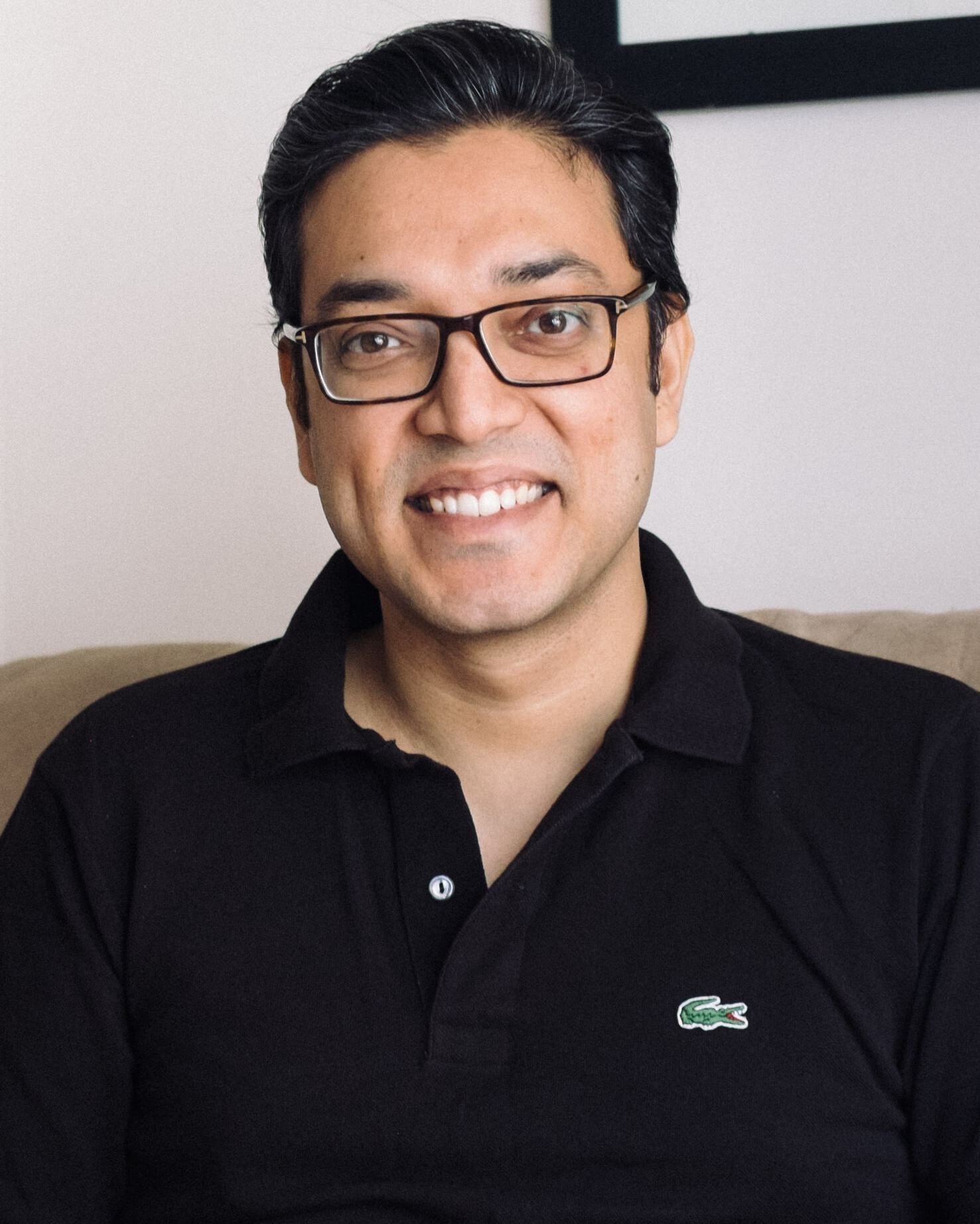
Anupam Roy, Best Music Composer & Best Lyricist

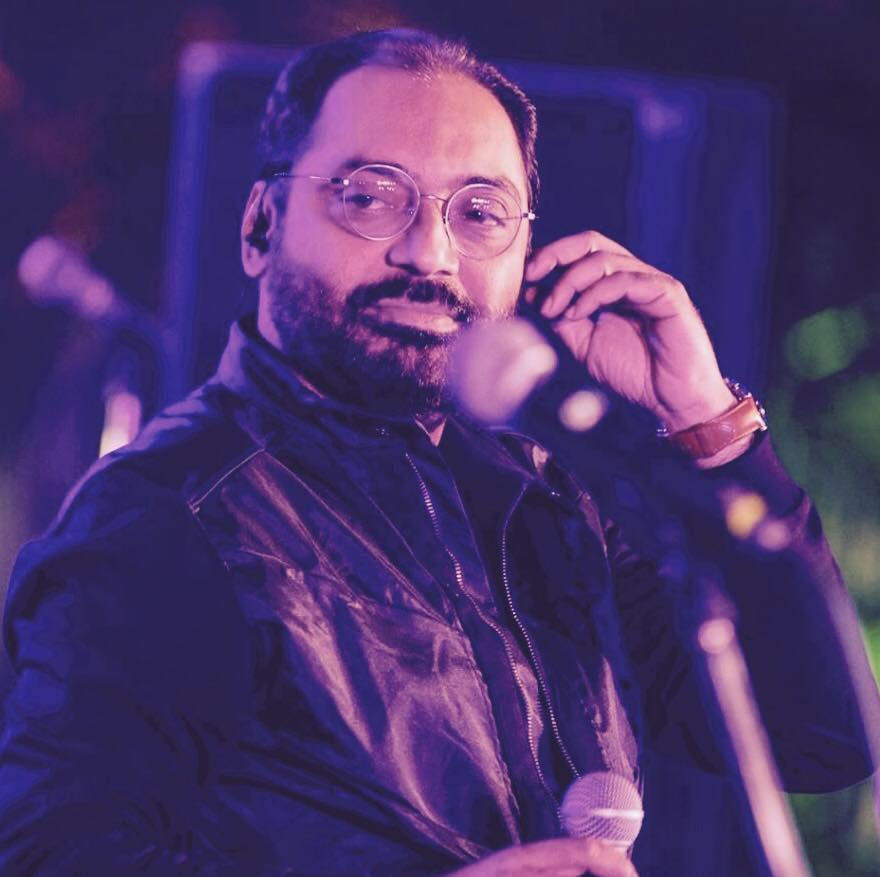
Anindya Chatterjee, Best Music Composer

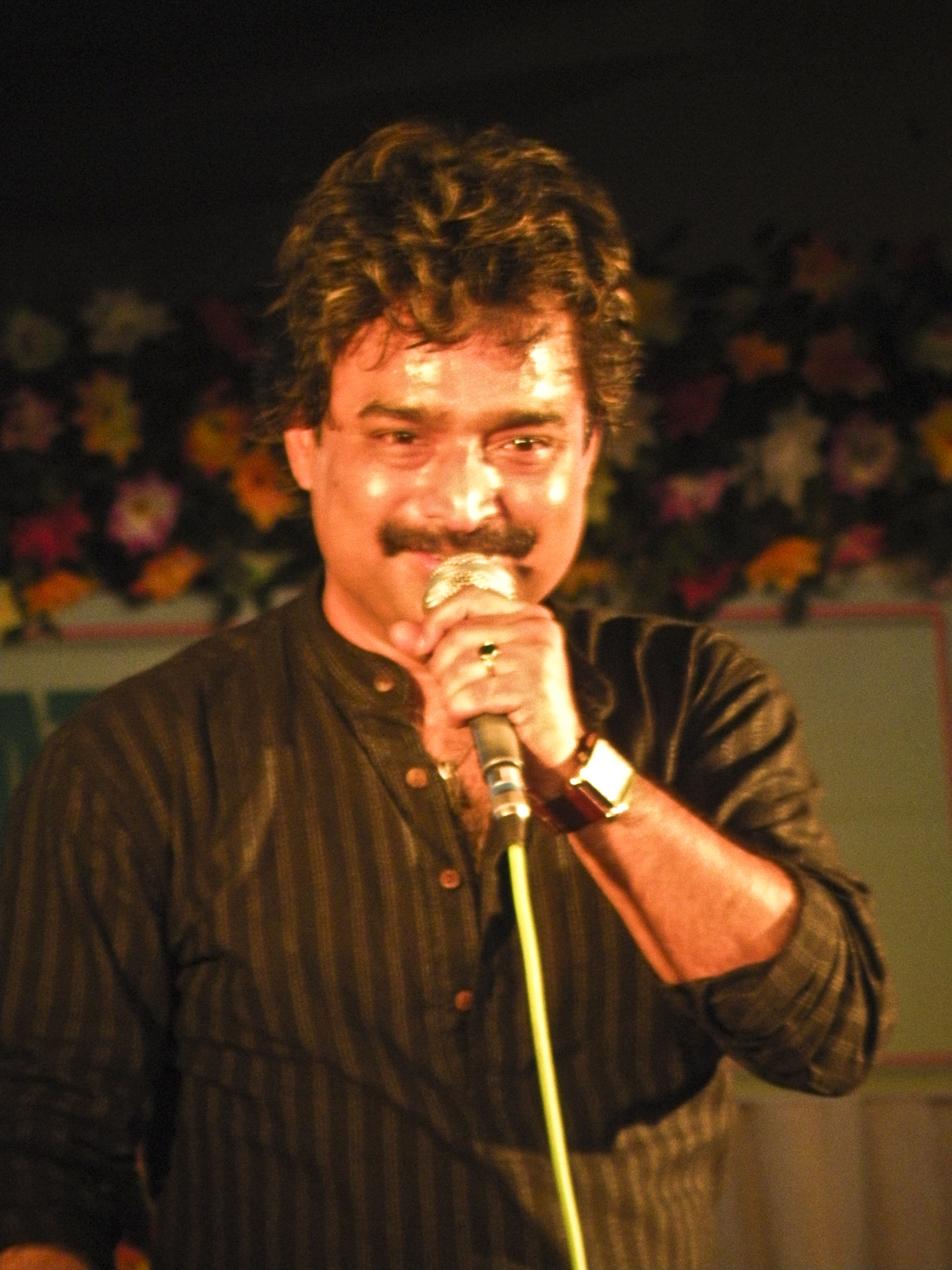
Nachiketa Chakraborty, Best Male Playback Singer

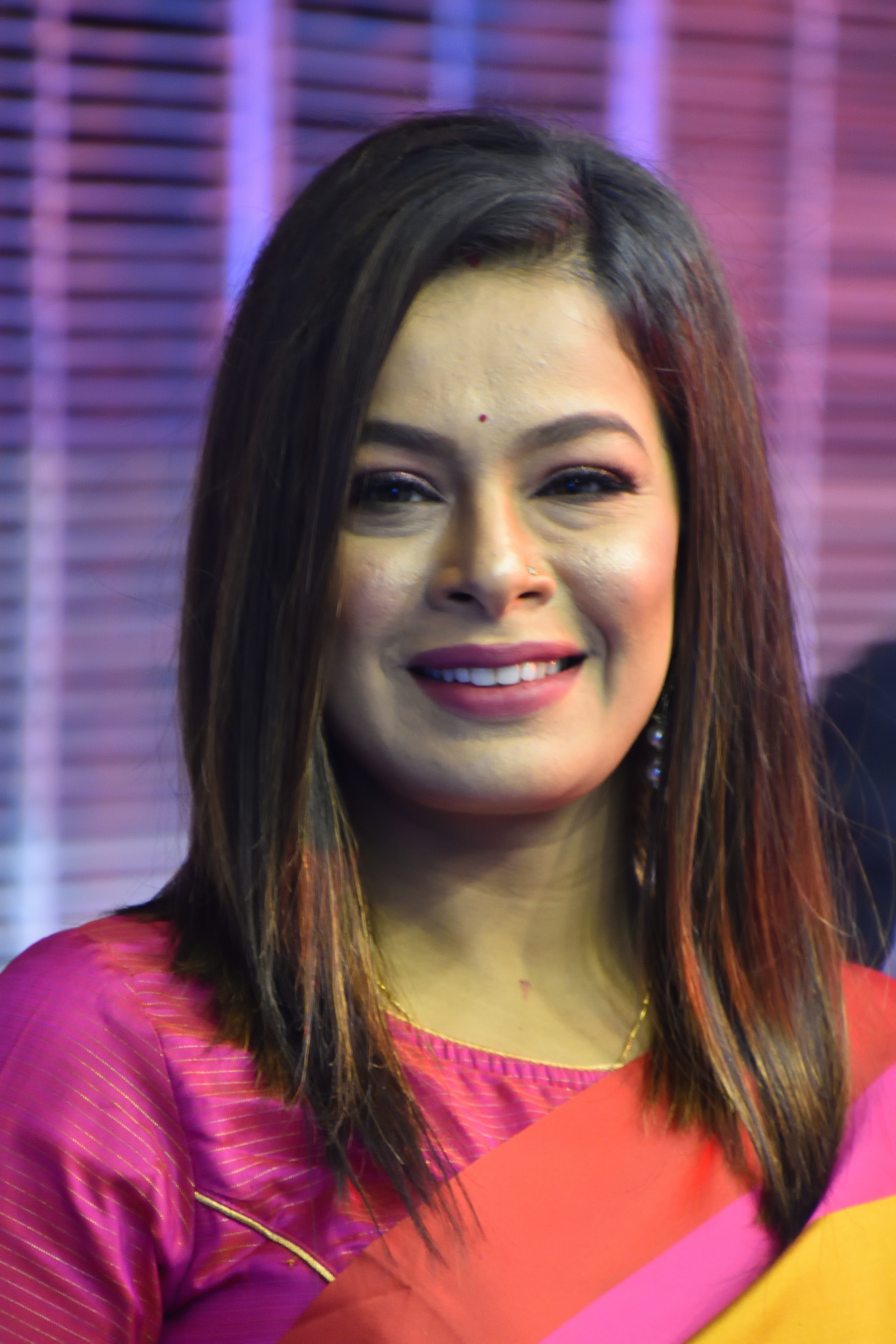
Iman Chakraborty, Best Female Playback Singer

Best Film	Best Director
Cinemawala – Shree Venkatesh Films; Double Feluda – Eros International; Eagoler Chokh – Shree Venkatesh Films; Praktan – Windows Production; Shaheb Bibi Golaam – Friends Communication; Shankhachil – Ashirbad Cholochitro, Impress Telefilm Limited & NIdeas Creations & Productions	Kaushik Ganguly – Cinemawala; Arindam Sil – Eagoler Chokh; Goutam Ghose – Shankhachil; Pratim D. Gupta – Shaheb Bibi Golaam; Sandip Ray – Double Feluda; Shiboprosad Mukherjee and Nandita Roy – Praktan
Best Actor	Best Actress
Prosenjit Chatterjee – Shankhachil as Muntasir Chaudhury Badal; Abir Chatterjee – Byomkesh Pawrbo as Byomkesh Bakshi; Chiranjeet Chakraborty – Shororipu as Detective Chandrakanta; Jeet — Power as Beerpratap Chowdhury; Dev – Zulfiqar as Markaz Ali; Jisshu Sengupta – Byomkesh O Chiriyakhana as Byomkesh Bakshi; Paran Bandopadhyay – Cinemawala as Pranabendu Das	Swastika Mukherjee – Shaheb Bibi Golaam as Jaya Sarkar; Gargi Roychowdhury – Benche Thakar Gaan as Dr. Paramita Sen; Jaya Ahsan – Eagoler Chokh as Shivangi B. Ray; Paoli Dam – Khawto as Antara Chakrabarty/Damayanti; Raima Sen – Monchora as Nanda Chaudhury; Rituparna Sengupta – Praktan as Sudipa Sen
Best Supporting Actor	Best Supporting Actress
Anirban Bhattacharya – Eagoler Chokh as Bishan Ray; Ritwick Chakraborty – Shaheb Bibi Golaam as Javed; Arun Guha Thakurta – Cinemawala as Hari; Jisshu Sengupta – Zulfiqar as Kashinath Kundu; Koushik Sen – Zulfiqar as Basheer Khan; Parambrata Chatterjee – Cinemawala as Prakash Das	Aparajita Auddy – Praktan as Malini "Molly" Mukherjee; Churni Ganguly – Bastu-Shaap as Antara; Mamata Shankar – Antarleen as Swati Dutta; Shajbati – Shankhachil as Rupsha Chaudhury; Sudipta Chakraborty – Shororipu as Bonhi
Music Awards
Best Music Director	Best Lyricist
Anupam Roy & Anindya Chatterjee – Praktan; Anupam Roy – Shaheb Bibi Golaam; Anupam Roy – Zulfiqar; Indraadip Das Gupta – Bastu-Shaap; Jeet Gannguli – Love Express	Anupam Roy – "Tumi Jaake Bhalobasho" – Praktan; Anupam Roy – "Ek purono Mosjide" – Zulfiqar; Anupam Roy – "Mon Bhalo Nei" – Shaheb Bibi Golaam; Prosen – "Thik Emon Ebhabe" – Gangster; Prosen – "Tomake Chai" – Gangster; Srijato – "Tomake Chuye Dilam" – Bastu-Shaap
Best Playback Singer - Male	Best Playback Singer - Female
Nachiketa Chakraborty – "Ek Purono Mosjide" – Zulfiqar; Anupam Roy – "Aami Aajkal Bhalo Aachi" – Zulfiqar; Anupam Roy – "Mon Bhalo Nei" – Shaheb Bibi Golaam; Arijit Singh – "Tomake Chuye Dilam" – Bastu-Shaap; Surojit Chatterjee – "Bhromor" – Praktan	Iman Chakraborty – "Tumi Jaake Bhalobasho" – Praktan; Anwesha Datta Gupta – "Dhoya Tulsi Pata" – Chocolate; Shreya Ghoshal – "Tomar Ki Naam" – Shaheb Bibi Golaam; Shreya Ghoshal – "Kolkata" – Praktan; Shreya Ghoshal – "Tomake Chuye Dilam" – Bastu-Shaap
Debut Awards
Best Debut Male	Best Debut Director
Yash Dasgupta – Gangster as Kabir (Guru)	Arindam Bhattacharya – Antarleen; Ayan Chakraborti – Shororipu

=== Critics' awards ===
Best Film (Best Director)
Cholai – Arun Roy
Best Actor	Best Actress
Paran Bandopadhyay – Cinemawala as Pranabendu Das	Rituparna Sengupta – Praktan as Sudipa Sen

==== Technical Awards ====
Best Story	Best Screenplay
Kaushik Ganguly – Cinemawala	Pratim D. Gupta – Shaheb Bibi Golaam
Best Dialogue	Best Editing
Subhomay Chatterjee – Cholai	Sanjeeb Datta – Shaheb Bibi Golaam
Best Choreography	Best Cinematography
Baba Yadav for Selfie – Abhimaan	Gairik Sarkar – Shaheb Bibi Golaam
Best Production Design	Best Sound Design
Dhananjay Mondal – Cinemawala	Anirban Sengupta – Shankhachil
Best Background Score
Neil Adhikari – Shaheb Bibi Golaam

==== Special awards ====
Lifetime Achievement Award
- Supriya Devi

== Superlatives ==
=== Multiple Nominations ===
- Shaheb Bibi Golaam – 12
- Praktan - 10
- Cinemawala - 8
- Zulfiqar - 7
- Shankhachil - 5
- Bastu-Shaap - 5
- Eagoler Chokh - 4
- Gangster - 3
- Shororipu - 3
- Double Feluda - 2
- Antarleen - 2

==== Multiple Awards ====
- Shaheb Bibi Golaam - 6
- Cinemawala - 5
- Praktan 5
- Shankhachil - 2
- Cholai - 2
