= Advocate Achinta Aich =

Indian Bengali legal drama web series

- Release poster
- Genre: Legal drama; Mystery thriller
- Written by: Sreejib
- Screenplay by: Sreejib
- Directed by: Joydeep Mukherjee
- Starring: Ritwick Chakraborty; Saswata Chatterjee; Surangana Bandyopadhyay; Sohini Sengupta
- Theme music composer: Subhadeep Guha
- Composer: Subhadeep Guha
- Country of origin: India
- Original language: Bengali
- No. of seasons: 3
- No. of episodes: 21

Production
- Producer: Mahendra Soni
- Production location: Kolkata
- Cinematography: Tuban Dey
- Editor: Malay Laha
- Camera setup: Single-camera
- Running time: 19 - 29 minutes
- Production companies: Shree Venkatesh Films; Motionwave Production

Original release
- Release: 2024 – present

Advocate Achinta Aich (also written as Adv. Achinta Aich) is an Indian Bengali-language legal drama web series directed by Joydeep Mukherjee. Produced under the banner of Shree Venkatesh Films and Motionwave Production, it is the first Bengali courtroom drama web series in India. Written by Sreejib, the series stars Ritwick Chakraborty in the titular role, while Saswata Chatterjee, Surangana Bandyopadhyay, Debraj Bhattacharya, Sohini Sengupta and Satyam Bhattacharya play other pivotal roles.

The first season revolves around a murder mystery in which Advocate Achinta Aich fights for a victim who has been falsely framed as a murderer. In the second season, Achinta Aich risks his own image in the society in order to defend a rape accused; he fights for a poor car driver who has been falsely accused of the rape and murder of a teenage girl. Subhadeep Guha has composed the music for the series. Tuban Dey did the cinematography, while Malay Laha handled the editing. Two seasons of the series are streaming on the Bengali OTT platform Hoichoi.

== Overview ==
=== Season 1 ===
The first season introduced Achinta Aich, a modest notary lawyer in North Kolkata who lives a quiet life with his bickering father and supportive fiance. He got his first major client when he decided to defend Malini Dutta, the wife of popular sarod player Pablo Dutta. The heir of the Dutta family, he is found murdered at his home, at a family gathering. Although multiple eyewitnesses were presented who had seen a bloodstained knife in Malini’s hand, Achinta sensed a deeper conspiracy within the influential Dutta family. Sitaram Ganguly fought the legal case against Achinta on behalf of the Dutta family.

As the trial progressed, Achinta discovered secrets regarding Pablo's biological lineage and his family’s obsession with maintaining their social reputation. Through his sharp observation, he systematically discarded the eyewitnesses. In the climax, it was revealed that Pablo was killed by his own grandmother to protect family secrets. The season ended with the grandmother’s lifetime imprisonment.

=== Season 2 ===
In the second season, the plot centers on a young girl, Dyuti Chatterjee, who is raped and murdered. Pritam, a driver, is being accused of the crime, but Achinta felt that he is not guilty and is getting framed by influential persons for a crime which he hasn't committed. This time, his primary adversary is Advocate Nandini Ganguly, a POCSO expert. To navigate the courtroom duels, Achinta even seeks advice from his former rival, Sitaram Ganguly.

The investigation led Achinta eventually linking the current crime to a cold case from twenty years ago. Different people, including a senior police official, help him with his legal battle despite the political pressures surrounding the case. The season culminates in a tense courtroom showdown where Achinta bridged the generational gap in legal thinking to secure a conviction.

=== Season 3 ===
In the third season, Achinta Aich takes up a new case. Neel Roy Burman, a wealthy businessman, dies in a car accident while travelling with his newly married wife, Debjani. Debjani survives and returns home injured. However, while performing Neel's last rites, a man arrives at their house claiming to be Neel.

Neel's family accepts the man but Debjani believes that he is an imposter because she saw her husband die in the accident. Debjani approaches Achintya for legal help. Achinta takes up her case against the powerful Roy Burman family. The family hires veteran lawyer Digvijay Sinha on their behalf. It is followed by the legal battle between Aich and Sinha, as they try to establish the identity of the man who claims to be Neel.

== Cast ==
Portrayed by	Character	1	2	3
Ritwick Chakraborty	Advocate Achinta Aich a.k.a. Tutul	Main
Debraj Bhattacharya	Lakkhan Bhim Sardar, Achinta's assistant	Main
Surangana Bandyopadhyay	Malini Dutta, Pablo's newly-wed wife	Main	None	None
Saswata Chatterjee	Advocate Sitaram Ganguly, Achinta's adversary turned mentor	Main	Guest	None
Dulal Lahiri	Achinta's father	Main	Main	Main
Kheya Chattopadhyay	Geeta, Achinta's wife	Main	Main	Main
Anumegha Kahali	Nupur, Ranajoy's daughter	None	Main	None
Sohini Sengupta	Advocate Nandini Sinha, POCSO expert and Achinta's adversary	None	Main	None
Satyam Bhattacharya	Ranajoy, a driver accused of the rape and murder of Dyuti Chatterjee	None	Main	None
Sabyasachi Chakrabarty	Advocate Digvijay Singha	None	None	Main
Ishaa Saha	Debjani Roy Burman	None	None	Main
Abhishek Bose	Neel Roy Burman, Debjani's husband and a rich businessman	None	None	Main
Mithu Chakrabarty	Shrabani Roy Burman, Neel's mother	None	None	Recurring
Tamali Chakrabarti		None	None	Recurring
Debjani Singha		None	None	Recurring
Debnath Chatterjee	Neel Roy Barman's paternal uncle	None	None	Recurring
Loknath Dey	Debnath Dutta, Pablo's relative	Recurring	None	None
Alakananda Roy	Kanankbala Dutta, eminent musician and Pablo's grandmother	Recurring	None	None
Bhabani Mukherjee	—	Recurring	None	None
Soumen Mukherjee	—	Recurring	None	None
Sabyasachi Hazra	Rudy, Pablo's maternal uncle	Recurring	None	None
Rohini Chatterjee	Lokkhi, Pablo's relative	Recurring	None	None
Saswati Guhathakurata	Judge	Recurring	None	None
Monalisha Chatterjee	—	Recurring	None	None
Lipika Chatterjee	—	Recurring	None	None
Srija Bhattacharya	—	Recurring	None	None
Roja Paramita Dey	Srijita Mukherjee, Pablo's relative	Recurring	None	None
Sanmitra Bhaumik	Pablo Dutta, Sarod player and Dutta family's grandson who is murdered	Guest	None	None
Ananya Guha	Dyuti Chatterjee, 17-year old girl who is raped and murdered	None	Guest	None
Rupanjana Mitra	Nina Chatterjee	None	Recurring	None
Somak Ghosh	—	None	Recurring	None
Sudip Mukherjee	—	None	Recurring	None

== Episodes ==
Series	Episodes	Originally released
1	7	26 April 2024
2	7	15 August 2025
3	7	7 August 2026

=== Season 1 ===
No.	Title	Directed by	Written by	Original release date
1	"Pablo Hotyakando"	Joydeep Mukherjee	Sreejib	26 April 2024
2	"Mukhbondho"	Joydeep Mukherjee	Sreejib	26 April 2024
3	"Asst Lakkhan Bhim Sardar"	Joydeep Mukherjee	Sreejib	26 April 2024
4	"Ami Pablo-ke Marini"	Joydeep Mukherjee	Sreejib	26 April 2024
5	"15 Jon Shakkhi"	Joydeep Mukherjee	Sreejib	26 April 2024
6	"Damini Case"	Joydeep Mukherjee	Sreejib	26 April 2024
7	"Dutta Barir Itihash"	Joydeep Mukherjee	Sreejib	26 April 2024

=== Season 2 ===
No.	Title	Directed by	Written by	Original release date
1	"Nyay Onnyay"	Joydeep Mukherjee	Sreejib	15 August 2025
2	"Bhutum"	Joydeep Mukherjee	Sreejib	15 August 2025
3	"POCSO"	Joydeep Mukherjee	Sreejib	15 August 2025
4	"Shomon"	Joydeep Mukherjee	Sreejib	15 August 2025
5	"Bichar"	Joydeep Mukherjee	Sreejib	15 August 2025
6	"Investigation"	Joydeep Mukherjee	Sreejib	15 August 2025
7	"Nyay Dokhol"	Joydeep Mukherjee	Sreejib	15 August 2025

=== Season 3 ===
No.	Title	Directed by	Written by	Original release date
1	"Bawal Shonyashi"	Joydeep Mukherjee	Sreejib	7 August 2026
2	"Biye Maneyi Consent"	Joydeep Mukherjee	Sreejib	7 August 2026
3	"Court'e Dekha Hobey"	Joydeep Mukherjee	Sreejib	7 August 2026
4	"Memory Game"	Joydeep Mukherjee	Sreejib	7 August 2026
5	"Secret Witness"	Joydeep Mukherjee	Sreejib	7 August 2026
6	"Project Poncho Pandav"	Joydeep Mukherjee	Sreejib	7 August 2026
7	"Right to ustice"	Joydeep Mukherjee	Sreejib	7 August 2026

== Production ==
=== Announcement and development ===
"Achinta is not the kind of lawyer who walks in with swagger. He is unsure of himself, often second-guessing, and that makes him more real. He lives with his father, grew up without his mother, and that affected his confidence. Even after winning a big case in the first season, he has not suddenly become a swish and cool lawyer. What makes him stand out is that he cares. He does not always think about the result, but if he can help, he will."

— Ritwick Chakraborty during an interview, regarding his character in the series Adv. Achinta Aich 2

In April 2024, Hoichoi announced ten new shows and four new seasons of four web series as a part of their "Hoichoi Poila Boisakh" slate announcement. Advocate Achinta Aich was announced in that slate. Character posters for Ritwick Chakraborty, Surangana Bandyopadhyay and Saswata Chatterjee were released in the first week of April 2024.

The makers had initially not planned a second season, but since the first season turned out to be successful, the second season was made. This marked Ritwick reprising a role twice for the second time only, after Gora.

The first-look poster for the second season announced its release date. The announcement video for the second season, titled Adv. Achinta Aich 2, was dropped on 2 August 2025. A poster was also released along with it.

On 8 January 2025, it was reported that the third season will be made soon. The third season was officially announced in the "Notun Bochorer Notun hoichoi" slate announcements on 12 January 2026.

=== Casting ===
Initially, Ambarish Bhattacharya was reported to play Ritwick Chakraborty's adversary in the first season. But he was later replaced by Anirban Chakrabarti.

But the makers didn't finalise Chakrabarti because they decided not to cast him in a negative character in order to keep his Eken Babu image intact. Finally, Saswata Chatterjee was roped in to play Ritwick's adversary, replacing Anirban Chakrabarti. Debraj Bhattacharya was cast to play Ritwick's associate. Paran Bandyopadhyay was roped in to play Ritwick's father. But he was replaced by Dulal Lahiri due to date issues. Loknath Dey was cast in a pivotal role in the first season.

Sabyasachi Chakraborty was cast in the third season as Advocate Digvijay Singha, Ritwick Chakraborty's adversary inside the courtroom. Ishaa Saha, Mithu Chakrabarty and Abhishek Bose were cast in pivotal roles alongside Sabyasachi. Debraj Bhattacharya and Kheya Chattopadhyay reprised their roles from the previous seasons.

=== Pre-production ===
I had to watch the previous season. I had to feel and remember what I was thinking during the shooting of season one. The mannerisms differ from character to character, but with Achinta I had to think again about how he reacts, how he walks, how he behaves. I haven’t often had the chance to play the same role twice — one was Gora, and now Achinta.

— Ritwick Chakraborty, during an interview with t2 Online

=== Filming ===
The filming of the first season was scheduled to start from the end of November 2023. It started in December 2023.

The filming of the second season was scheduled to start on 5 February 2025. But it got postponed owing to issues with the Federation of Cine Technicians and Workers of Eastern India. Director Joydeep Mukherjee complained that the federation hasn't clearly informed them about what the particular problem is. He added, "On 4 January, the Federation asked us to meet them via an email. We sent 3-4 emails in its reply but didn't get any answer. On 30 January, via another email, they asked us to meet on 3 February. We went there on the allotted date, but we were told that the officials had left. After a long wait, they told us to call the next day. We did as told, but all in vain. We visited the office again, and it's the same thing. As a result, I was forced to stop the shooting." He also added that the delay caused date issues for many actors.

== Release ==
The first season Advocate Achinta Aich was rated U/A 13+ by the Central Board of Film Certification. It was streamed on the Bengali OTT platform Hoichoi on 26 April 2024. The second season, titled Adv. Achinta Aich 2, received U/A 16+ from the Central Board of Film Certification. The age limit was increased since the second season deals with sensual topics like "rape" and "false victim blaming". It was streamed on Hoichoi on 15 August 2025.

== Marketing ==
The teaser for the first season of Advocate Achinta Aich was released on 31 March 2024. The trailer was revealed on 16 April 2024. The teaser for the second season, termed as "Series Preview", was dropped on 6 August 2025. The trailer of the second season was released on 8 August 2025. The trailer for the third season was released on 26 July 2026.

== Reception ==
=== Critical reception ===
==== Season 1 ====
Poorna Banerjee of The Times of India rated the series 3.5/5 stars and wrote "Advocate Achinta Aich is one of the better whodunit series that has released this year. Joydeep Mukherjee delivers a well-crafted courtroom drama with it." He applauded Ritwick Chakrborty's performance, his quirky body language and sharp observation skills, Debraj Bhattacharya's comic timing, Saswata Chatterjee's dominating performance and Surangana Bandyopadhyay's range of emotions but bemoaned the rushed ending.

Shamayita Chakraborty of OTTplay rated the series 3/5 stars and opined "Ritwick Chakraborty’s courtroom drama follows a linear and simplistic path and yet keeps us engaged due to performance. It is not the finest or the most intense legal drama out there and it is far from being realistic. Yet, it exudes the charm of simplicity, wit, and humour that works." She praised the well written initial episodes, strong character build-ups, several dramatic scenes, the dialogues, Ritwick's performance, Saswata's shrewd acting, performance of the ensemble cast, particularly Lokenath Dey and Dulal Lahiri, Surangana Bandyopadhyay's sublime portrayal and Debraj's comic timing but criticized the script in the later episodes, the hurried series ending and Saswata's one-dimensional character.

Archi Sengupta of Leisure Byte rated the series 2.5/5 stars and opined "Entertaining yet utterly forgettable, Advocate Achinta Aich is a one-time watch. It gets its messaging right and its protagonist is absolutely delightful to follow. However, it does fall into the trap of being a cliched and convenient watch." She applauded Ritwick Chakraborty's performance, Debraj Bhattacharya's comic timing, Ritwick's chemistry with Debraj, Ritwick's chemistry with his father, Saswata and Surangana in their respective roles, the twist present in the seventh episode but criticized the cliched plot, predictable dialogues, not so surprising "head honcho" character of Saswata Ganguly and, his childish and anti-climactic intimidations rather than doing something meaningful.

Sudeep Ghosh of Anandabazar Patrika rated the series 7/10 stars and wrote "Director Joydeep Mukherjee adds another success to his list, replicating the age old formula of courtroom dramas." He praised the casting of the series, the courtroom battle between Ritwick and Saswata, the performance of the associate cast, Surangana's more expressive and less dialogue acting but mentioned that the screeplay could have been better.

==== Season 2 ====
A critic from Aaro Ananda rated the series 3/5 stars and wrote "Advocate Achinta Aich is one of the most successful courtroom dramas made in Tollywood." She praised the director for his presentation of Ritwick Chakraborty in the character of Achinta Aich, the intense climax present at the end of each episode, Ritwick's unusual but smooth performance, Debraj's acting and Sohini Sengupta's performance as the antagonist lawyer.

==== Season 3 ====
Poorna Banerjee of The Times of India rated the series 3/5 stars and wrote "Advocate Achintya Aich returns to the screen with a smartly plotted drama (Sreejib), mingling interpersonal relationships seamlessly into the action-laden plot as it progresses." She appreciated the directions, the presence of ample twists, identifiable clues for the audience, well shot action sequences, the focus on different narratives, the usage of mild humour, the performance of the actors, the music, the background score and the message delivered at the end but bemoaned the occasional slowing down of the story and the lack of enough psychological tussle between opposing lawyers.

Parama Dasupta of Aajkal reviewed the series and highlighted "Along with the old cases that have stirred up real-life issues, this time too, some recent events have returned to the unthinkable case." She praised the screenplay, the psychological tussle between the lawyers, the performance of the actors - particularly Ritwick and Sabyasachi, the courtroom sequences, the comedic scenes, the action sequences and the climax but criticized the low intensity of the legal case which has been dealt with in this season. Debatri Ghosh of Sangbad Pratidin reviewed the series and opined "As a viewer, the third season of Advocate Achintya Aich is quite enjoyable to watch." She applauded the presence of ample twists, the direction and the performance of the actors but bemoaned the weak screenplay and poor dialogues.
