= Mrigaya: The Hunt =

2025 Bengali crime thriller film by Abhirup Ghosh

- Directed by: Abhirup Ghosh
- Screenplay by: Aritra Banerjee; Abhirup Ghosh; Soumit Dev
- Dialogues by: Soumit Dev
- Story by: Debashish Dutta; Additional Story: Pallab Malakar
- Produced by: Suman Banerjee
- Starring: Ritwick Chakraborty; Vikram Chatterjee; Anirban Chakrabarti; Rezwan Rabbani Sheikh; Sourav Das; Priyanka Sarkar; Susmita Chatterjee; Ananya Bhattacharya
- Cinematography: Subhadeep Naskar
- Edited by: Sumit
- Music by: Songs: Rana Mazumder; Nirupam Dutta; Background score: Amlaan A. Chakraborty; Bob SN
- Production company: Tenth Dimension Entertainment
- Distributed by: PVR Inox Pictures
- Release date: 27 June 2025
- Country: India
- Language: Bengali

Mrigaya: The Hunt (Bengali pronunciation: [mriɡɔja]) is a 2025 Indian Bengali-language neo-Western buddy cop action thriller film co-written and directed by Abhirup Ghosh. Produced by Tenth Dimension Entertainment, the film starts an ensemble cast of Ritwick Chakraborty, Vikram Chatterjee, Anirban Chakrabarti, Rezwan Rabbani Sheikh, Sourav Das, Priyanka Sarkar and Ananya Bhattacharjee in her debut, with Susmita Chatterjee in a special appearance.

Based on a real-life murder of a Sonagachhi based prostitute in 2021, with heavy inspiration from the Bawaria cult (1995–2005), the story of the film is written by Debashish Dutta, the officer-in-charge of Maniktala Police Station, who was a part in investigating the original incident. It follows four cops who unite to hunt down a tribe gang, supposed to be the masterminds behind the assassination of a prostitute.

Announced in November 2024, marking Ghosh's collaborations for the third time with Chakrabarti and the second with Chatterjee. Principal photography commenced in December 2024 and wrapped up in February 2025, with filming taking places in Kolkata, Howrah and Jamshedpur. Music of the film is composed by Rana Mazumder and Nirupam Dutta. Subhadeep Naskar handled its cinematography, while Sumit edited the film.

Mrigaya was theatrically released on 27 June 2025 to critical acclaim from critics with praise for its cast performances, direction, script, cinematography and musical score. The authenticity of capturing the incidents, along with the realistic portrayal of the West Bengal Police in fiction was highlighted and praised by critics.

== Cast ==
- Ritwick Chakraborty as OC Debanjan Dutta
- Vikram Chatterjee as SI Animesh Roy
- Anirban Chakrabarti as Rudra, a hacker from Lalbazar
- Rezwan Rabbani Sheikh as Imran, an officer from Anti-Dowry squad
- Sourav Das as Sardaar, the leader of a UP-based tribe gang
- Priyanka Sarkar as Chhaya Das, a prostitute
- Ananya Bhattacharya as Chameli / Annapurna
- Mrityunjoy Bhattacharya as Jagai
- Trishanjit Chowdhury as Madhai

=== Special appearance ===
- Sohini Guha Roy as Maya, Debanjan's wife
- Susmita Chatterjee in the song "Shor Machaa"
- Sushmita Roy as Labonno

== Music ==
Rana Mazumder and Nirupam Dutta composed the soundtrack of Mrigaya. The first single "Shor Machaa" was released on 29 May 2025.

Track listing
No.	Title	Lyrics	Music	Singer(s)	Length
1.	"Maa"	Debasis Dutta	Rana Mazumder	Trisha Chatterjee	4:21
2.	"Shunye Shuru"	Debasis Dutta	Rana Mazumder	Somlata Acharyya Chowdhury	4:26
3.	"Shor Machaa"	Murlidhar Sharma	Rana Mazumder	Sunidhi Chauhan	3:47
4.	"Majhraater Tara"	Debasis Dutta	Nirupam Dutta	Rupam Islam	4:28
5.	"Ora Boley Geche"	Debasis Dutta	Nirupam Dutta	Nirupam Dutta	4:28

== Marketing ==
A motion poster of the film was unveiled on 1 May 2025, on the occasion of Labour Day. Its teaser was launched on 18 May 2025.

== Future ==
The director, Ghosh, wanted to span a "cop universe" starting from this film. In 2026, he announced a spin-off sequel to this film, title Mrigaya 1.5: The Hunt Continues, with Ritwick Chakraborty reprising his role, and Koushani Mukherjee and Arpan Ghoshal playing new cop characters. The film is set to release on ZEE5 on 13th November, 2026.
