= Rakkhosh (2026 film) =

2026 Bangladeshi film

- Film poster
- Directed by: Mehedi Hassan Hridoy
- Produced by: Azeem Haroon; Shahreen Akter Sumi
- Starring: Siam Ahmed; Susmita Chatterjee; Shataf Figar; Sujata Azim
- Production company: Real Energy Production
- Distributed by: Real Energy Production; Galaxy Media (United State)
- Release date: 21 March 2026
- Country: Bangladesh
- Budget: est. ৳6 crore (US$490,000)
- Box office: ৳2.68 crore (US$220,000)

Rakkhosh (Note: Bengali: রাক্ষস, romanized: Rākṣasa, lit. 'Monster'; While the term "Rakkhosh" originally refers to a mythological being in Hindu scriptures, it is used here as a metaphor for brutality and ruthlessness.) is a 2026 Bangladeshi action thriller film directed by Mehedi Hassan Hridoy. The film was produced by Azeem Haroon and Shahreen Akter Sumi under the banner of Real Energy Production. It stars Siam Ahmed and Susmita Chatterjee, Shataf Figar, Sujata Azim, Masud Mohiuddin, Shohel Mondol, Nazneen Hasan Chumki, Ali Raj. The film was released on 21 March 2026, on the occasion of Eid-al Fitr.

== Synopsis ==
Rakkhosh follows a man, played by Siam Ahmed, whose life is shattered by a violent tragedy. Consumed by grief and anger, he sets out on a path of revenge, gradually becoming more brutal and detached from his former self. As he takes on powerful enemies, his actions blur the line between justice and vengeance, ultimately turning him into the very "monster" he seeks to fight.

== Cast ==
- Siam Ahmed in dual role:
  - Rusho Shamsher Seikh
  - Nisho Shamsher Seikh
- Susmita Chatterjee as Raisa Jahan "Diya"
- Shataf Figar as Zayaan
- Masud Mohiuddin as Shamim Seikh
- Shohel Mondol as Shayaan
- Samm Battacharya as Jillu
- Nazneen Hasan Chumki as Rusho and Nisho's mother
- Ali Raj as Shamsher Seikh, Rusho and Nisho's father
- Sujata Azim as Zayaan, Shayaan and Ayaan's grandmother
- Sadnima Binte Noman as Nila
- Abrar Athar as Ayaan
- Natalia Janoszek as Item girl in the song "Bilet Raja"
- Shakib Khan as Ariyan Mirza (archive footage from Borbaad)

== Production ==
=== Development ===
Rakkhosh is the second film of Mehedi Hassan Hridoy after Borbaad (2025). It was described as a high-energy film, a mix of mayhem, crime, and romance, with a more elaborate production than Borbaad.

=== Casting ===
There were rumours that the project was initially given to Shakib Khan, who had collaborated with Hridoy in the film Borbaad. Reports suggested that Hridoy offered Khan three scripts, but none of them were to his liking, leading to Khan rejecting them. Subsequently, Siam Ahmed and Susmita Chatterjee were selected to play the lead roles. This film marked Susmita Chatterjee's debut in the Bangladeshi film industry. Sadnima Binte Noman joined the cast in January 2026. In February 2026, film director Abrar Athar announced his presence in the film, marking his acting debut.

=== Filming ===
Principal photography began at BFDC in December 2025. The film's major portion of shooting has been completed in Dhaka, with actress Susmita Chatterjee returning to Kolkata after completing her portion. On January 4, 2026, the team traveled to Sri Lanka for filming. On January 14, actress Sadnima Binte Noman began filming for an important role in Sri Lanka and returned to Bangladesh after completing it. Siam Ahmed joined the shooting in Sri Lanka on January 15, where several scenes of drama and fight scenes have been completed. A significant portion of the film was planned to be shot in Malaysia. (Note: Attributed to multiple sources:) Bollywood actress Natalia Janoszek also performed in a song from the film. (Note: Attributed to multiple sources:)

=== Sensor clearance ===
In 16 March 2026, ahead of its theatrical release, Rakkhosh officially received its censor clearance certificate from the Bangladesh Film Certification Board. The film was cleared along with four other major theatrical productions scheduled for release during the competitive Eid festival season.

== Theme and Influences ==
Most of the film's theme aligns with the theme of the movie Borbaad. This is because the background of the trailer, released on March 13, 2026, matches that of Borbaad. Additionally, Jillu (Samm Bhattacharya), a supporting character from Borbaad, also appears in this film.

== Music ==
On the holy night of Shab-e-Qadr, March 16, 2026, the film's first song, "Shuddhotar Prem," was released. The song was sung by Imran Mahmudul and Konal, written by Tonmoy Parvez, and composed by Arafat Mohsin Nidhi. The second song, "Tumi Chara," was released on March 18. It was performed by Imran and Dola Rahman, written by Robiul Islam Jibon, and composed by Imran himself. On March 19, the film's third song, "Bilet Raja," an item song, was released. This track was sung, written, and composed by G.M. Ashraf, featuring Dola Rahman. Bollywood actress Natalia Janoszek appeared as the item girl in this song.

No.	Title	Lyrics	Music	Singer(s)	Length
1.	"Shuddhotar Prem"	Tonmoy Parvez	Arafat Mohsin	Imran Mahmudul, Konal	02:48
2.	"Tumi Chara"	Robiul Islam Jibon	Imran Mahmudul	Imran Mahmudul, Dola Rahman	03:14
3.	"Bilet Raja"	G. M. Ashraf	G. M. Ashraf	G. M. Ashraf, Dola Rahman	02:34
4.	"Tumi Chara (reprised version)"	Robiul Islam Jibon	Imran Mahmudul	Humayra Eshika	03:28
5.	"Tumi Amar"	Robiul Islam Jibon	Imran Mahmudul	Dola Rahman	03:21
6.	"Kolki 2.0"	Molla Bhai	Arafat Mohsin	Rizvi Rizu	03:23

== Release ==
The film was released in Bangladeshi theaters on Eid-ul-Fitr on March 21, 2026, clashing with Prince: Once Upon a Time in Dhaka, Domm: Until The Last Breath, Banalata Express, and Pressure Cooker. The film was also released in United States on 17 April 2026 and it was distributed by Galaxy Media in the United States. The film also released in Rome, Italy.

=== Home media ===
Following its theatrical run, Rakkhosh expanded its distribution by releasing simultaneously on two major over-the-top (OTT) streaming platforms. This digital release was aimed at reaching a broader global and domestic audience post its festival season theatrical screening.

== Reception ==
=== Box office ===
According to data from Bangla Movie Review (BMR), Rakkhosh maintained a steady performance at multiplexes during its initial release. The film grossed Tk 13.93 lakh on its opening day, followed by Tk 20.28 lakh on the second day. On its third day, the film recorded Tk 21.92 lakh, bringing its cumulative three-day multiplex gross to Tk 56.14 lakh. During this period, the film demonstrated a strong hold, with 18 out of 22 scheduled shows running housefull across Star Cineplex and Lion Cinemas. In its third week of theatrical release, Rakkhosh sustained steady audience interest at major multiplexes in Dhaka, including Star Cineplex, Lion Cinemas, and Blockbuster Cinemas. Despite ongoing discussions and uncertainties regarding the potential suspension of evening shows, the film secured 13 active screenings at Star Cineplex during this period, demonstrating a stable visual presence alongside other major Eid-ul-Fitr releases. During its theatrical run, Rakkhosh generated a strong commercial response at traditional single-screen theaters across Bangladesh. The film attracted significant crowds, demonstrating its appeal beyond urban multiplexes and solidifying its performance as a successful mainstream release among mass audiences during the festival season.

=== Critical response ===
It received mixed to positive reviews from critics and audience. Writing for Dhaka Post, filmmaker Masud Hasan Ujjwal commended the film's technical aspects, particularly its sound design, background score, and visual direction, alongside strong performances from Siam Ahmed and the antagonist. However, he criticized the second-half screenplay for relying on conventional commercial cliches.

Writing for Prothom Alo, Masum Apu described Rakkhosh as a commercial entertainer anchored by Siam Ahmed's lead performance, which he noted successfully masked the screenplay's logical flaws and inconsistent narrative. Apu also praised supporting actors Shohel Mondol and Abrar Athar, as well as the film's music, background score, and visual presentation.

Writing for Bangla Movie Database, critic Rahman Moti gave rating 8 out of 10 and noted, Siam Ahmed's performance as central to the film. Critics praised his physical transformation and dedication, noting his shift from an academic persona to an action-driven lead, particularly in the film's climax and street fight sequences. While his vocal delivery received mixed reactions, reviewers noted it as a significant step for his first full-fledged action role.

=== Audience response ===
It received mixed to positive reviews from critics and audience, with critics praising its cinematography, visual style, cast performances particularly that of Siam Ahmed and action sequences. However, it was criticized for its graphic violence, toxic thematic elements, and a derivative plot, with some reviewers noting similarities to the 2023 Indian action drama Animal. Thikana News wrote, the film received praise for its plot, production, and acting, with lead actor Siam Ahmed's performance drawing particular attention from the audience. Jagonews24's survey mentioned, Shohel's performance and appearance as the antagonist 'Shayan' successfully caught the audience's attention. Prothom Alo wrote, the film generated strong audience interest from its opening day. Following positive responses from multiplexes during its opening week, Madhumita Cinema Hall owner Iftekhar Uddin Nawshad announced plans to screen the Siam Ahmed starrer Rakkhosh starting from its second week. Samakal wrote, Siam's new appearance and action-oriented role were highly appreciated by the audience.

On the review aggregator platform Letterboxd, Rakkhosh received mixed-to-positive reactions from audiences. General viewers praised the film for its high-octane action sequences, stylized visuals, and Siam Ahmed's energetic performance. However, some audience reviews pointed out pacing issues in the narrative and similarities to contemporary South Indian action thrillers. As of July 2026, the film maintains a user-weighted average rating on the platform, reflecting its status as a prominent mainstream Eid release.

=== Marketing ===
Following the release of the film's promotional material, The Daily Star noted that the official trailer for Rakkhosh promised a narrative filled with blood, intensity, and brutality. The preview highlighted Siam Ahmed's transformation into a fierce, action-heavy character, marking a distinct departure from his previous roles. The publication also emphasized the trailer's gritty visual tone and action choreography, which set high expectations for the film's theatrical release as a major action thriller. Following the release of the film's promotional footage, a preview by Priya Roy of T2 Online noted that, the trailer for Rakkhosh hints at a dark, intense, and violent narrative framed around a vengeful love story. The commentary highlighted the trailer's gritty visual aesthetic and atmospheric tension, suggesting that the film would blend high-stakes action with a deeply emotional, dark romantic core driven by its central characters.

== Sequel ==
The director of the film, Mehedi Hassan Hridoy announced that Rakkhosh 2 will be made, and also added that it will have a connection to his first film Borbaad (2025).

== Accolades ==
Awards	Category	Name	Result	Notes	Ref.
BIFA Awards	Best Film Actor	Siam Ahmed	Nominated		
BIFA Awards	Best Breakthrough Performance	Shohel Mondol	Nominated		
BIFA Awards	Best Playback Singer (Female)	Dola Rahman	Won	For the song "Bilet Raja"	
Meril-Prothom Alo Awards	Best Film	Rakkhosh	Nominated		
Meril-Prothom Alo Awards	Best Film Actor	Siam Ahmed	Nominated		
Meril-Prothom Alo Awards	Best Playback Singer (Female)	Dola Rahman	Nominated	For the songs "Bilet Raja" and "Tumi Chara"	
Meril-Prothom Alo Awards	Best Playback Singer (Female)	Somnur Monir Konal	Nominated	For the song "Suddhotar Prem"	
Meril-Prothom Alo Awards	Best Playback Singer (Male)	Imran Mahmudul	Nominated	For the song "Tumi Chara"	
Meril-Prothom Alo Awards	Best Playback Singer (Male)	GM Ashraf	Nominated	For the "Bilet Raja"	
Meril-Prothom Alo Awards	Best Newcomer Actor	Abrar Athar	Nominated		
