= Mrigaya 1.5: The Hunt Continues =

2026 Bengali crime thriller film by Abhirup Ghosh

- Directed by: Abhirup Ghosh
- Screenplay by: Aritra Banerjee; Abhirup Ghosh; Soumit Deb
- Dialogues by: Soumit Deb
- Story by: Debashish Dutta
- Produced by: Suman Banerjee
- Starring: Ritwick Chakraborty; Koushani Mukherjee; Arpan Ghoshal; Mir Afsar Ali; Ananya Bhattacharya
- Cinematography: Subhadeep Naskar
- Edited by: Sumit C
- Music by: Songs: Rana Mazumder; Background score: Amlaan A. Chakraborty; Bob SN; Kuntal De
- Production company: Tenth Dimension Entertainment
- Distributed by: ZEE5
- Release date: 13 November 2026
- Country: India
- Language: Bengali

Mrigaya 1.5: The Hunt Continues (Bengali pronunciation: [mriɡɔja]) is an upcoming Indian Bengali-language neo-Western buddy cop action thriller film co-written and directed by Abhirup Ghosh. Produced by Tenth Dimension Entertainment, the film is a spin-off sequel to the 2025 film Mrigaya: The Hunt. The film stars Ritwick Chakraborty, reprising his role, alongside an ensemble cast of, Koushani Mukherjee, Mir Afsar Ali, Arpan Ghoshal and Ananya Bhattacharjee, with Vikram Chatterjee in a special appearance.

The story of the film is written by Debashish Dutta, the officer-in-charge of Maniktala Police Station, who was a part in investigating the original incident that was covered in the first film of the universe. It follows four cops who unite to hunt down a "cyber mafia" mafia, that traps young girls and exploit them.

Music of the film is composed by Rana Mazumder. Subhadeep Naskar handled its cinematography, while Sumit edited the film, retained from the first film.

Mrigaya 1.5: The Hunt Continues was released direct-to-video on Zee 5 on 13 November 2026.

== Plot ==
The film centres on Debanjan Dutta, who investigates a cybercrime case alongside Joyeeta, a capable but short-tempered officer, and Poritosh, a junior officer known for his unusual Bengali vocabulary. Agniswar, Debanjan's mentor and a senior officer nearing retirement, guides the investigation.

A brutal neighbourhood crime draws Debanjan and his team into a dangerous investigation. Under pressure from senior officers, the media and public scrutiny, their apparent breakthroughs expose further danger and deception as a ruthless gang spreads fear and violence across Kolkata.

== Cast ==
- Ritwick Chakraborty as OC Debanjan Dutta
- Koushani Mukherjee as SI Joyita Sen
- Arpan Ghoshal as SI Paritosh Saha
- Mir Afsar Ali as ACP Agnishwar Chatterjee
- Aritra Dutta Banik as Aritra, a journalist
- Ananya Bhattacharya as Sreyanshi Banerjee
- Sohini Guha Roy as Maya, Debanjan's wife
- Vikram Chatterjee as SI Animesh Roy (Special appearance)

== Music ==
Rana Majumder is associated with the film's music direction. Usha Uthup and Antara Mitra have lent their voices to songs in the film.

== Release ==
The film is scheduled for release on 20 November 2026. BookMyShow and TicketNew identify it as a Bengali-language action-crime thriller, while The Telegraph India described it as a Bangla Zee 5 original film following the release of its trailer on 6 November 2026.

== Reception ==
Mrigaya 1.5: The Hunt Continues received generally positive reviews from critics. Reviewers praised its investigation-led screenplay, the performances of Ritwick Chakraborty, Koushani Mukherjee, Arpan Ghoshal and Ananya Bhattacharya, Soumit Deb's humorous Bengali dialogues and its treatment of technology-enabled crime, while noting that the first half could have been more tightly paced.

Indulge Express gave the film 3.5 out of 5 stars. It praised the film for portraying the evolving nature of digital crime, its suspenseful investigation, Soumit Deb's dialogue, and the performances of Ritwick Chakraborty, Koushani Mukherjee, Arpan Ghoshal and Ananya Bhattacharya. The review singled out Bhattacharya's emotional range as Sreyangshi, calling her one of the film's standout performers, but felt that the make-up could have been better in places and that some cinematic clichés could have been avoided. The Telegraph India praised the film's central investigation, saying that it effectively expanded from an initial case into a larger web of cybercrime, including self-staged crimes, honey-trapping, extortion, robbery, phishing, image morphing, gang wars and murder. It also appreciated the balance of suspense, action, humour and emotion, along with the restrained performance of Ritwick Chakraborty and the comic timing of Arpan Ghoshal. Sangbad Pratidin described the film as a worthwhile expansion of Abhirup Ghosh's cop universe. It praised the action sequences, particularly the climax, the performances of Arpan Ghoshal, Mir Afsar Ali and Ananya Bhattacharya, and the film's final surprise cameo. The review, however, felt that Aritra Bandyopadhyay's screenplay could have been more gripping in the first half and that some viewers might find the early pacing slow.

== Franchise context ==
Mrigaya 1.5: The Hunt Continues is a spin-off of Mrigaya: The Hunt (2025), rather than a direct continuation of that film's plot. Ghosh has described it as a way to explore Debanjan Dutta's backstory and establish character context before the franchise expands into a larger sequel.
