= Bhalobashar Shohor =

2017 Bengali Short Film

- Directed by: Indraneil Roy Chowdhury
- Starring: Ritwick Chakraborty; Sohini Sarkar; Jaya Ahsan
- Release date: July 2017
- Country: India
- Language: Bengali

Bhalobashar Shohor (The city of love) is a Bengali short film from India. The film was released in July, 2017. Bangladesh actress Jaya Ahsan, Ritwick Chakraborty, Sohini Sarkar and Arun Mukherjee played the lead roles in the film. The film was directed by Indraniel Roy Chowdhury.

== Cast ==
- Jaya Ahsan
- Ritwick Chakraborty
- Sohini Sarkar
- Arun Mukherjee

== Release ==
This short film is released by director YouTube and Vimeo release in 2017.

== Plot ==
The love of Adil Haider and Annapurna Das drags them into one of the Syrian cities described as beautiful, Homs. Muslim, Hindi speaking Adil, and Hindu, Bengali-speaking Annapurna. The two thousand year old city of Homs, is in war, bomb, grenade, cannonball. Like many places in the Middle East, Afghanistan, Iraq, Iran, Syria were destroyed. Destruction with him was the life of Adil and Annapurna. Adil was lying in Syria, hit by a bomb. Annapurna came back to her old town in Kolkata, where Adil and her first met a few years ago, she loved him.

Annpurna fights an economic war and social war. As a young girl, she has a life of 14-hours school attendance on the day of the mother, and at the same time the women of high-tech society go to her house to get massage. Where temptation, lust, dignity and nerve war with eyesight. Where the hope of surviving the child's child in the shelter of an old father. Hope for her to be healed for the wounded forever, the hope of recovering the body. And the question of Adil, who has left the same, is expected to reach him on the basis of the bureaucracy, and see him once alive.

== Reaction ==
The film is available on YouTube and Vimeo after its release. Many film artists and researchers mention the significance of the film and the message of society.
