= Pagal Premi =

- Directed by: Hara Patnaik
- Written by: Sukumar
- Produced by: A. Ramesh Prasad; Ashok Dhanuka; Himanshu Dhanuka
- Starring: Ritwick Chakraborty; Yash Dasgupta; Arpita Mukherjee
- Music by: Manmatha Misra
- Production company: Eskay Movies
- Distributed by: Prasad Productions
- Release date: 7 September 2007
- Country: India
- Language: Bengali

Pagal Premi (transl. Crazy lover) is a 2007 Indian Bengali-language romantic drama film directed by Hara Patnaik and stars Ritwick Chakraborty, Yash Dasgupta, and Arpita Mukherjee in their feature film debuts. This film is a remake of Telugu movie Arya (2004).

The film was simultaneously shot in Odia as Pagala Premi starring Sabyasachi Mishra and Arpita.

== Plot ==
Surya and Gitanjali are smart college students. Surya falls in love with Gitanjali at first sight. Ajay is a spoilt brat and is the son of local M.P. Abinash. Ajay likes Gitanjali and thus proposes to her. When Gitanjali refuses, Ajay threatens that he will jump from the college roof top. Being a meek girl, Gitanjali accepts the proposal and starts dating Ajay.

Meanwhile, Surya proposes to Gitanjali. In the presence of Gitanjali's boy friend, Ajay, Gitanjali refuses. But Surya doesn't yet to give up on her as he feels that Gitanjali doesn't love Ajay truly. Surya tries to impress Gitanjali sincerely without creating a rift between the two. The film is all about how Surya tries to win Gitanjali with his attitude and positive out look.

== Cast ==
- Ritwick Chakraborty as Surya
- Yash Dasgupta as Ajay Banerjee
- Arpita Mukherjee as Geetanjali Debi / Geeta
- Pradyumna Lenka as M.P. Avinash Banerjee
- Saroj Dash as Railway TTE
- Chaitali Dutta Barman as Geetanjali's Mother
- Debjani Deghuriya as Shanti, Geeta's friend
- Rajesh Sharma as Subbu, Avinash’s Goon
- Sanjay Bhola as Tony, Suriya’s friend
- Alok Roy as Ajay’s Friend
- Koyel Das
- Bimal Roy as Avinash’s Goon
- Abhinayashree as an item number in "Aa Mane Agarpura"

== Production ==
Music director Goutam-Sushmit recommended Yash Dasgupta after he won a glam competition in Kolkata. He signed the film thinking he is playing one of the heroes but was disappointed that Ritwick Chakraborty was projected as the sole hero in promotional posters. According to Yash, his character had gray shades but wasn't negative. Paoli Dam was offered to either star in this film or Kaalbela (2009) and she chose the latter; newcomer Arpita Mukherjee was cast as her replacement.

== Soundtrack ==
The songs were composed by Manmatha Misra, who reused all the songs from the original.

No.	Title	Singer(s)	Length
1.	"Tomar Hashite Ami"	Kumar Bapi	5:09
2.	"Feel My Love"	Moon	4:56
3.	"Aa Mane Agarpura"	Tapu Mishra, Hara Patnaik	4:59
4.	"Asho Gaibo Dujone"	Kumar Bapi	1:44
5.	"Tak Dhin Dha"	Moon	4:58
6.	"Ogo Priya"	Moon	4:32

== Release ==
Several actors from the Bengali film fraternity attended the film's premiere at Nandan in Kolkata.
