= Prem Tame =

2021 Indian Bengali film

- Theatrical release poster
- Directed by: Anindya Chatterjee
- Written by: Anindya Chatterjee
- Produced by: Shree Venkatesh Films
- Starring: Susmita Chatterjee; Soumya Mukherjee; Sweta Mishra
- Cinematography: Subhankar Bhar
- Edited by: Arghyakamal Mitra
- Music by: Shantanu Moitra; Anupam Roy
- Production company: Shree Venkatesh Films
- Distributed by: Shree Venkatesh Films
- Release date: 12 February 2021
- Country: India
- Language: Bengali

Prem Tame is a 2021 Bengali romance film directed and written by Anindya Chatterjee. It had a theatrical release on 12 February 2021.

== Cast ==
- Susmita Chatterjee as Raji
- Soumya Mukherjee as Pablo
- Sweta Mishra as Arshi
- Baisakhi Marjit

== Soundtrack ==
Prem Tame

Soundtrack album by Shantanu Moitra, Anupam Roy
- Released: 2021
- Genre: Film soundtrack
- Length: 20:42
- Language: Bengali
- Label: SVF

Track listing
No.	Title	Singer	Length
1.	"Taakey Olpo Kachhe Dakchhi"	Mahtim Shakib	3:14
2.	"Tomar E Toh Kachhe"	Anindya Chatterjee	4:22
3.	"Jawl Phoring 2.0"	Anupam Roy	4:15
4.	"Kachhe Thako"	Papon, Shreya Ghoshal	4:11
5.	"Prem Tame (Title Track)"	Shreya Ghoshal	4:40
Total length:			20:42
