= Ekee Britte =

Bangladeshi film

- Bengali: একই বৃত্তে
- Directed by: Kazi Morshed
- Written by: Kazi Morshed
- Starring: Tauquir Ahmed; Naznin Hasan Chumki; Md Saif Khan Swachho
- Music by: Sheikh Sadi Khan
- Release date: 2013
- Country: Bangladesh
- Language: Bengali

Ekee Britte is a 2013 Bangladeshi film starring Naznin Hasan Chumki and Tauquir Ahmed in lead roles. Chumki earned a Meril-Prothom Alo Critics Choice Award for Best Film Actress and Md Saif Khan Swachho earned Bangladesh National Film Awards for Best Child Artist.

== Story ==
Chumki plays a maid, who works in a professed landlord's house. The film portrays her struggle in life.

=== Soundtrack ===
No.	Title	Lyrics	Music	singer	Length
1.	"Gongone Akash"	Munshi Wadid	Sheikh Sadi Khan	Andrew Kishore

== Awards ==
38th Bangladesh National Film Awards

- Winner: Best Child Actor - Md Saif Khan Swachho

Meril Prothom Alo Awards

- Winner: Best Actress (critics) - Naznin Hasan Chumki
