= Pratim D. Gupta =

Indian journalist and filmmaker (born 1981)

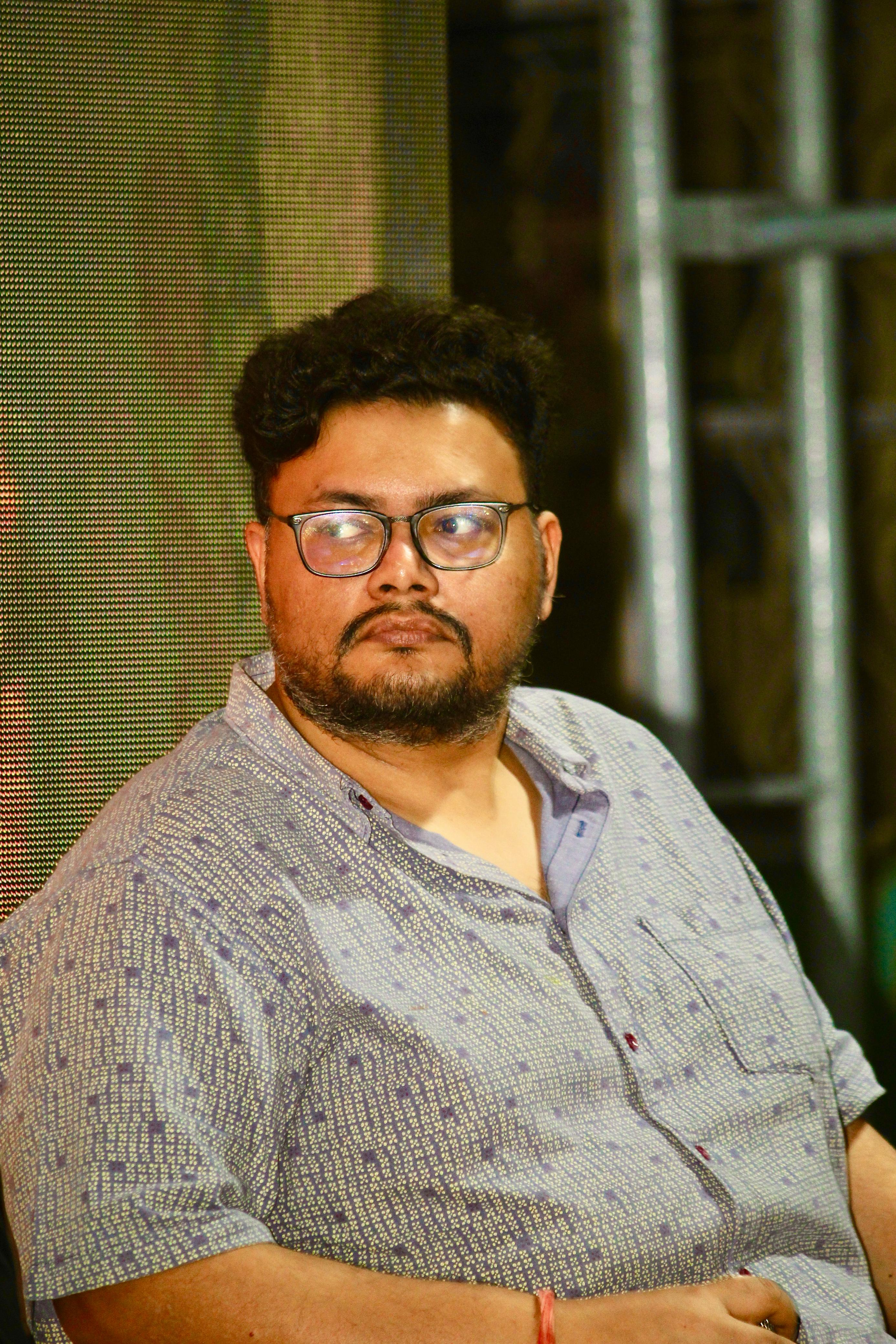
- Pratim in 2025
- Born: Pratim Dasgupta; 11 November 1981 (age 44); Kolkata, India
- Education: South Point School; St. Xavier's College, Kolkata
- Occupations: Journalist; Film critic; Screenwriter; Film director
- Years active: 2012-present

Pratim D. Gupta (born 11 November 1981) is an Indian journalist, film critic, screenwriter and film director. He started his career as a film critic for The Telegraph and later for Film Companion. His first film as writer-director is Paanch Adhyay (2012), starring Priyanshu Chatterjee and Dia Mirza. His subsequent films Shaheb Bibi Golaam (2016), Maacher Jhol (2017) and Chaalchitro - The Frame Fatale (2024) have received critical acclaim.

== Early life ==
Pratim Dasgupta was born in Kolkata in 1981 and studied in South Point School. He has a degree in Mass Communication and Film Studies from St. Xavier's College, Kolkata.

== Career ==
While working as a journalist with The Telegraph, Gupta's script Vanish was selected for the prestigious Binger Script Lab at the Locarno International Film Festival in 2009. He got his first break with the romantic drama Paanch Adhyay which is also the first Bengali film for Bollywood actress Dia Mirza. Written and directed by Gupta, the film was shot almost entirely in Calcutta in November and December 2011. The film was selected as the Centrepiece Premiere at New York's South Asian International Film Festival (SAIFF) and picked as the New Voice in Indian Cinema at the Mumbai Film Festival (MAMI).

In 2013, Gupta collaborated with 10 other filmmakers to be part of the collaborative project X: Past Is Present. The film premiered in New York in 2014 and released in Indian theatres in November 2015. Gupta's second feature film was, Shaheb Bibi Golaam. released in 2016. It was the first mainstream Bangla film to be picked up by Netflix, going on to win 6 Filmfare Awards, including Best Actress, Best Supporting Actor & Best Screenplay for Pratim.

In 2013, Pratim's screenplay Ink was selected for the prestigious Sundance Lab (India edition), where Pratim developed his script with Oscar winners like Asif Kapadia and Joshua Marston. Pratim later adapted the script into his 2019 Bengali film Shantilal O Projapoti Rohoshyo.

Maacher Jhol starring Ritwick Chakraborty as a Paris-based masterchef who returns to his roots in Kolkata was Pratim's third feature film. It was an official selection in the Indian Panorama section of the International Film Festival of India 2018 in Goa. It was later picked up by Netflix as well and this time won Pratim the Best Dialogue Filmfare Award.

Early in 2018, Pratim wrote and directed the Hindi telefilm Mirchi Malini as part of Sujoy Ghosh's Teen Paheliyan series for Star Plus and Hotstar.

Ahare Mon, Pratim's fourth Bengali film starring Adil Hussain and Paoli Dam among others, has played at festivals in India and abroad and was picked as one of the best Indian films of the year by noted film critic Meenakshi Shedde in Sunday Mid Day.

Pratim was featured in the Men of the Year list of 2018 by Man’s World magazine.

== Filmography ==
Year	Film	Director	Writer	Notes	Ref.
2012	Paanch Adhyay	Yes	Yes	South Asian International Film Festival, New York – Centrepiece Premiere; Mumbai International Film Festival, MAMI – New Voice in Indian Cinema	
2015	X: Past Is Present	Yes	Yes	South Asian International Film Festival, New York – Opening Film; International Film Festival of Kerala – India Premiere	
2016	Shaheb Bibi Golaam	Yes	Yes	New York Indian Film Festival – International Premiere	
2017	Maacher Jhol	Yes	Yes	International Film Festival of India – Panorama Section; South Asian International Film Festival, New York – Best Film Runner-Up	
2018	Ahare Mon	Yes	Yes	South Asian International Film Festival, New York – Official Selection; Hyderabad Bengali Film Festival – Official Selection; Singapore South Asian International Film Festival – Official Selection; Indian Film Festival of Melbourne – Beyond Bollywood Section; Auroville Film Festival – Official Selection	
2019	Shantilal O Projapoti Rohoshyo	Yes	Yes	South Asian International Film Festival, New York – Official Selection; Brahmaputra Valley Film Festival – Opening Film; Asian Film Festival, Los Angeles – Official Selection	
2020	Love Aaj Kal Porshu	Yes	Yes	Selected for New York Indian Film Festival, which got cancelled because of COVID-19	
2024	Chaalchitro - The Frame Fatale	Yes	Yes		
2025	Ranna Baati	Yes	Yes		

== Web series ==
Year	Web series	Director	Writer	Platform	Notes	Ref.
2023	Tooth Pari: When Love Bites	Yes	Yes	Netflix	Directorial debut in web series	
2025	Karma Korma	Yes	Yes	Hoichoi	Directorial debut in a Bengali web series	

== Accolades ==
Year	Award	Ceremony	Film	Category	Result	Ref.
2012	Kalakar Awards	—N/a	Paanch Adhyay	Best Film	Won	
2017	Filmfare Awards East	2nd Filmfare Awards East	Shaheb Bibi Golaam	Best Screenplay	Won	
2017	Filmfare Awards East	2nd Filmfare Awards East	Shaheb Bibi Golaam	Best Film	Nominated	
2017	Filmfare Awards East	2nd Filmfare Awards East	Shaheb Bibi Golaam	Best Director	Nominated	
2018	Filmfare Awards East	3rd Filmfare Awards East	Maacher Jhol	Best Dialogue	Won	
2018	Filmfare Awards East	3rd Filmfare Awards East	Maacher Jhol	Best Director	Nominated	
2018	Filmfare Awards East	3rd Filmfare Awards East	Maacher Jhol	Best Story	Nominated	
2018	Filmfare Awards East	3rd Filmfare Awards East	Maacher Jhol	Best Screenplay	Nominated	
