= Ahare Mon =

- Directed by: Pratim D. Gupta
- Written by: Pratim D. Gupta
- Screenplay by: Pratim D. Gupta
- Story by: Pratim D. Gupta
- Produced by: Avishek Ghosh & Manisha
- Starring: Adil Hussain; Ritwick Chakraborty; Paoli Dam; Mamata Shankar; Parno Mittra; Anjan Dutt; Chitrangada Chakraborty
- Cinematography: Soumik Haldar
- Music by: Avijit Kundu
- Release date: 22 June 2018
- Running time: 110 min
- Country: India
- Language: Bengali

Ahare Mon is a 2018 Indian Bengali-language romantic drama film directed by Pratim D. Gupta and stars Adil Hussain, Anjan Dutt, Mamata Shankar, Ritwick Chakraborty, Paoli Dam, Parno Mittra and Chitrangada Chakraborty in the lead roles.

== Cast ==
- Adil Hussain as Purnendu Pahari
- Dev as Dev (Special Appearance)
- Anjan Dutt as Barun Sarkar
- Ritwick Chakraborty as Michael Tendulkar
- Mamata Shankar as Charulata Dutta
- Chitrangada Chakraborty as Titli
- Parno Mittra as Suzie Q
- Paoli Dam as Ramona Chatterjee
- Biswanath Basu as Special appearance
- Kunal Chakraborty as Jayanta
- Akshay Kapoor as Boutique manager

== Plot ==
A heartwarming collage of inter-connected love stories, Ahare Mon is a romantic drama that revolves around people who are otherwise forbidden to fall in love. Anjan Dutt and Mamata Shankar play two members of an old age home who elope and embark on an adventure of a lifetime. Ritwick and Parno play hustlers who plan and pull off one con job after another. Adil Hussain plays an immigration officer at the airport who comes across a ravishing frequent flyer played by Paoli Dam. Chitrangada Chakraborty plays Titli, a girl fighting a terminal disease but crazily in love with Dev.

== Production ==
=== Development ===
Pratim D. Gupta revealed that he had been wanting to make a love story for a long time but wanted to do something offbeat. He had the airport story idea with him for a long time and later developed the other three stories which can go with the same theme of loneliness, love and companionship. Like his earlier film Shaheb Bibi Golaam, the stories get entwined turning Ahare Mon into one single story.

=== Casting ===
Pratim wrote the characters played by Anjan Dutt, Mamata Shankar, Ritwick Chakraborty, Paoli Dam and Parno Mittra with them in mind having worked with them in Shaheb Bibi Golaam and Maacher Jhol. The film marks the first collaboration between the director and Adil Hussain who agreed to do the film after reading just a couple of pages of the script. Chitrangada was selected after many rounds of audition for the role of Titli.

=== Filming ===
Shooting for the film started from January 2018.

== Critical response ==
Ahare Mon opened to rave reviews with critics finding the film a heartwarming anthology of delightful love stories.

Shantanu Ray Chaudhuri of Film Companion called the film "the best Bengali film of the year" giving it 4/5 stars. He wrote in his review "What makes the film work is not just how skilfully the director weaves the stories together – that’s a sine qua non-for a film like this – but how he keeps the proceedings intriguing, throwing in a twist every time you least expect it, which gives the film a lightness that belies the core underlying each story: the loneliness of the human condition."

The Times of India gave the film 4/5 writing "It achieves a lot more in this short span of time than most blockbusters do with their bloated scripts."

== Music ==
The background music for Ahare Mon is composed by "Avijit Kundu" and the songs composed by Neel Dutt. Monta Ahare has been sung by Durnibar Saha and penned by filmmaker Srijit Mukherji while the lyrics of the title track, Ahare Mon, has been written by Srijato and sung by Madhubanti Bagchi. One of the songs has been written and composed by Rabindranath Tagore and sung by Anjan Dutt. The music rights have been acquired by Amara Muzik.

Ahare Mon

Soundtrack album by Avijit Kundu, Neel Dutt
- Released: 2018
- Recorded: 2018
- Genre: Feature film soundtrack
- Label: Amara Muzik
- Producers: Avishek Ghosh & Manisha

Singles from Ahare Mon
- 1. "Monta Ahare" Released: 30 May 2018; 2. "Ahare Mon Title Track" Released: 8 June 2018; 3. "Ogo Bideshini" Released: 16 June 2018; 4. "Ahare Mon (Title Track) Reprise Version" Released: 24 June 2018

All lyrics are written by Srijit Mukherji, Srijato, Rabindranath Tagore; all music is composed by Avijit Kundu, Neel Dutt, Rabindranath Tagore.

Track listing
No.	Title	Lyrics	Music	Artist(s)	Length
1.	"Monta Ahare"	Srijit Mukherji	Neel Dutt	Durnibar Saha	3:26
2.	"Ahare Mon Title Track"	Srijato	Neel Dutt	Madhubanti Bagchi	2:46
3.	"Ogo Bideshini"	Rabindranath Tagore	Rabindranath Tagore, Rearrangement : Neel Dutt	Anjan Dutt	2:53
4.	"Ahare Mon (Title Track) Reprise Version"	Srijato	Neel Dutt	Neel Dutt	4:33

== Awards ==
- Official selection for Hyderabad Bengali Film Festival
