= Shaheb Bibi Golaam =

2016 Indian Bengali film

- Film Poster
- Directed by: Pratim D. Gupta
- Produced by: Firdausul Hasan
- Starring: Anjan Dutt; Swastika Mukherjee; Ritwick Chakraborty; Vikram Chatterjee; Parno Mittra
- Music by: Anupam Roy
- Release date: 26 August 2016
- Country: India
- Language: Bengali

Shaheb Bibi Golaam is an Indian Bengali Psychological thriller film directed by Pratim D. Gupta and stars Anjan Dutt, Swastika Mukherjee and Ritwick Chakraborty in the lead roles. The film depicts the story of a contract killer, a housewife and a taxi driver from a Metropolitan city. The music was released by Amara Muzik.

== Cast ==
- Anjan Dutt as Jimmy
- Swastika Mukherjee as Jaya
- Ritwick Chakraborty as Javed
- Parno Mittra as Rumi
- Vikram Chatterjee as Zico Roy
- Alokananda Roy
- Sudip Mukherjee
- Suman Mukherjee
- Avishek De Biswas as Nakul

== Production ==
=== Development ===
Pratim D. Gupta clarified the fact that the film is neither an adaptation of the novel of the same name by Bimal Mitra, nor does it have any connection with the earlier film adaptations of the novel. The story of the film has been totally created by Gupta himself and the script was written five years before the development, prior to Paanch Adhyay.

Though titles like Jimmy Jaya Javed and Trikaal were initially into consideration for the film, it was finally chosen to be Shaheb Bibi Golaam.

=== Casting ===
The film marks the first collaboration between the director and the lead actors. Though Mukherjee was initially opted for the female lead in Paanch Adhyay, the role later switched over to Dia Mirza. Anjan Dutt instantly gave a nod to the film when he heard the script while being in a casual discussion with Gupta. Dutt will be playing the role of a middle-aged Anglo-Indian contract-killer and Mukherjee's character will be that of middle-class housewife. Ritwick Chakraborty will be portraying the role of a taxi driver, who is in a relationship with the character played by Parno Mittra.

=== Filming ===
Shooting for the film started from November 2014.

== Music ==
The music for Shaheb Bibi Golaam is composed by Anupam Roy and the lyrics have been penned by Anupam himself. The music rights have been acquired by Amara Muzik. The full music album was released on 6 August 2016.

| No. | Title | Singer | Length |
|---|---|---|---|
| 1. | "Mon Bhalo Nei" | Anupam Roy | 5:00 |
| 2. | "Tomar Ki Naam" | Shreya Ghoshal | 4:14 |
| 3. | "Ghorir Kantar Mawto" | Tanya Sen | 3:34 |
| 4. | "Tomar Shawhore" | Anjan Dutt | 4:01 |
| Total length: | | | 21:58 |

== Awards and nominations ==
| Award | Category | Recipient(s) | Result | Ref. |
|---|---|---|---|---|
| 2nd Filmfare Awards East | Filmfare Award for Best Film - Bengali | Shaheb Bibi Golaam | Nominated | |
| 2nd Filmfare Awards East | Filmfare Award for Best Director - Bengali | Pratim D. Gupta | Nominated | |
| 2nd Filmfare Awards East | Filmfare Award for Best Actress - Bengali | Swastika Mukherjee | Won | |
| 2nd Filmfare Awards East | Filmfare Award for Best Supporting Actor - Bengali | Ritwick Chakraborty | Won | |
| 2nd Filmfare Awards East | Filmfare Award for Best Music - Bengali | Anupam Roy | Nominated | |
| 2nd Filmfare Awards East | Filmfare Award for Best Lyrics - Bengali | Anupam Roy for Mon Bhalo Nei | Nominated | |
| 2nd Filmfare Awards East | Filmfare Award for Best Playback (Female) - Bengali | Shreya Ghoshal for Tomar Ki Naam | Nominated | |
| 2nd Filmfare Awards East | Filmfare Award for Best Playback (Male) - Bengali | Anupam Roy for Mon Bhalo Nei | Nominated | |
| 2nd Filmfare Awards East | Filmfare Award for Best Dialogue - Bengali | Pratim D. Gupta | Nominated | |
| 2nd Filmfare Awards East | Filmfare Award for Best Screenplay - Bengali | Pratim D. Gupta | Won | |
| 2nd Filmfare Awards East | Filmfare Award for Best Editing - Bengali | Sanjeeb Dutta | Won | |
| 2nd Filmfare Awards East | Filmfare Award for Best Background Score - Bengali | Neil Adhikari | Won | |
| 2nd Filmfare Awards East | Filmfare Award for Best Story - Bengali | Pratim D. Gupta | Nominated | |
| 2nd Filmfare Awards East | Filmfare Award for Best Cinematography - Bengali | Gairik Sarkar | Won | |
| 2nd Filmfare Awards East | Filmfare Award for Best Production Design - Bengali | Saswati Karmakar | Nominated | |
