= Savyasachi =

Savyasachi (Sanskrit: Savyasācin- lit. ''ambidextrous'') may refer to:

- Savyasachi, an epithet of Arjuna, character from the Mahabharata
- Savyasachi (1995 film), a Kannada-language film
- Savyasachi (2018 film), a Telugu-language film
