= Paanch Adhyay =

- Film poster
- Directed by: Pratim D. Gupta
- Written by: Pratim D. Gupta
- Produced by: Kaustuv Roy
- Starring: Priyanshu Chatterjee; Dia Mirza; Soumitra Chatterjee
- Cinematography: Ananda Chakravarti
- Edited by: Arghyakamal Mitra
- Music by: Shantanu Moitra
- Release date: 19 October 2012 (Kolkata)
- Running time: 113 minutes
- Country: India
- Language: Bengali

Paanch Adhyay (lit. five chapters) is a 2012 Bengali romantic drama set in Kolkata. The film marks the Bengali language debut for Bollywood actress Dia Mirza. The film is written and directed by Pratim D. Gupta, the resident film critic of The Telegraph newspaper in Kolkata and produced by Kaustuv Roy. The music of the film has been scored by Shantanu Moitra. Besides a successful six-week run in Bengal, Paanch Adhyay was selected as the Centerpiece Premiere at the South Asian International Film Festival in New York and in the New Voice in Indian Cinema section at the Mumbai Film Festival. Paanch Adhyay also won the Best Film Award at the prestigious Kalakar Awards.

== Plot ==
Paanch Adhyay is the story of love found and lost in the lives of a contemporary Indian couple, told in moments past and present. Plunged into passion from the moment they meet in Kolkata, Arindam (Priyanshu Chatterjee) and Ishita's (Dia Mirza) different ideologies - towards life and art - push them apart.

== Cast ==
- Dia Mirza as Ishita Roy Chowdhury
- Priyanshu Chatterjee as Arindam Roy Chowdhury
- Sampurna Lahiri as Ranjabati Sen
- Anubrata Basu as Rajat
- Anindya Bannerjee as Suri
- Shibnath Dey as Kalyan
- Kaushal Kumbhat as Mr Mehta
- Seema Sapru as Principal
- Suman Mukhopadhyay as Dr. Bakshi
- Ritoban Das as Ad Assistant
- Neel Bhattacharya as Footballer
- Soumitra Chatterjee as Hrishi-da

== Reception ==
=== Critical reception ===
Paanch Adhyay received overwhelmingly positive reviews from critics and filmmakers alike. Director Imtiaz Ali called the film "Bangla cinema's modern Charulata" and wrote "Wonderful lyrics and singing. Music strikes a quirky balance of a modern and traditional. Detailed and effective art work, thoughtful camera compositions and a rapid pace make the movie an emotional experience." Writing for Outlook, Dola Mitra gave it 3 out of 4 stars and wrote in her review – "The film begins promisingly, but falters midway, picks up momentum again and ends in a crescendo of emotions.". The Times of India gave Paanch Adhyay 3.5 stars praising the novel storytelling and the soulful music.

== Soundtrack ==
Paanch Adhyay

Soundtrack album by Shantanu Moitra
- Genre: Feature film soundtrack
- Label: RP Music
- Producer: Shantanu Moitra

The soundtrack of the film was composed by Shantanu Moitra, consisting of four Bengali songs written by Anindya Chatterjee & Chandril Bhattacharya, two Hindi songs written by Swanand Kirkire and one English song written by Pratim D. Gupta. Paanch Adhyay songs received high positive reviews from critics and audience and the song Uda jaay was a high critical and commercial success.

Track#	Song	Singer(s)	Lyric(s)	Duration
1	"Baavri"	Shreya Ghoshal	Anindya-Chandril	4:07
2	"Agontuk"	Shaan, Shreya Ghoshal	Anindya-Chandril	3:51
3	"Uda jaay"	Swanand Kirkire	Anindya-Chandril	5:22
4	"Phire paoar gaan"	Ash King	Anindya-Chandril	4:17
5	"Rahoon tere peechhe"	Kaushiki Chakrabarty		4:31
6	"Urey jaaye"	Shubha Mudgal	Anindya-Chandril	6:01
7	"You & Me"	Usha Uthup		4:03
