= Susmita Chatterjee =

Indian actress and model

- Born: 15 November 1999 (age 26); Asansol, West Bengal, India
- Occupations: Model, actress

Susmita Chatterjee is an Indian actress and model who primarily works in Bengali film industry. She is mainly known for Prem Tame (2021), Paka Dekha (2022), Khela Jawkhon (2022) and Chengiz (2023).

== Education ==
Chatterjee did her Engineering from Techno India saltlake in Electronics. She used to participate in various culture fest during her college days.

== Filmography ==
=== Film ===
Key
†	Denotes films that have not yet been released

Year	Title	Role	Notes	Ref.
2021	Prem Tame	Raaji	Debut film	
2021	Maradonar Juto	Hiya		
2022	Paka Dekha	Tiyasha		
2022	Kacher Manush	Asha		
2022	Khela Jawkhon	Apala		
2023	Joy Kali Kalkattawali	Mili		
2023	Chengiz	Nandini		
2023	Shibpur	Paramita		
2023	Manush: Child of Destiny	Kajal		
2024	Shesh Rokkha	Rupsha		
2024	Shri Durga Aradhana	Durga		
2025	Sohochori	Meghna		
2025	Mrigaya: The Hunt	Nautch Girl	Special appearance in the song "Shor Machaa"	
2025	Have You Seen Him	Bela		
2025	Lawho Gouranger Naam Rey	Nayana		
2026	Rakkhosh	Raisa Jahan "Diya"	Debut in Bangladeshi film	
2027	Bhalobashar Morshum †	Paramita	Filming	
