= Ritwick Chakraborty =

Indian Bengali actor (born 1977)

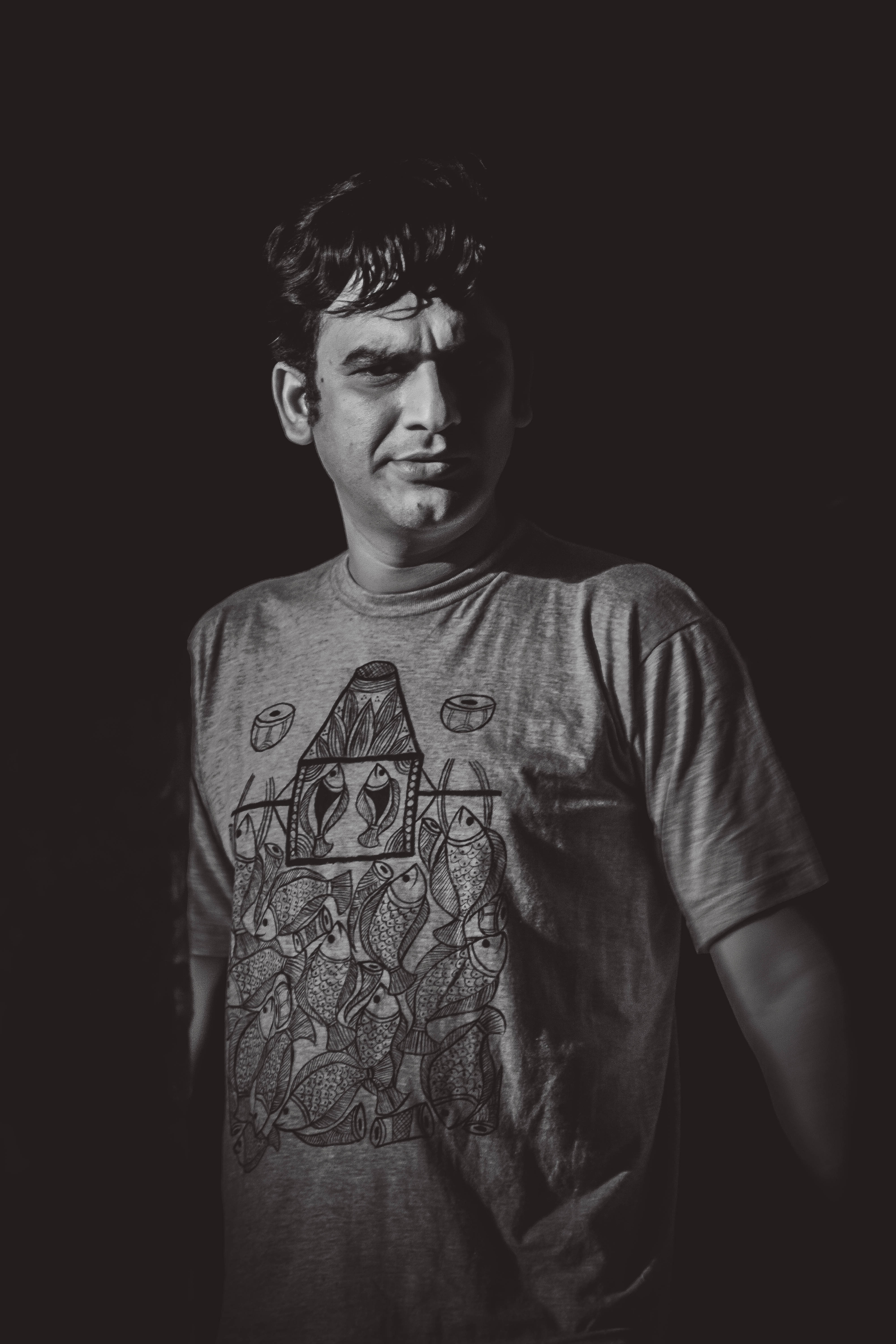
- Chakraborty in 2017
- Born: Rittik Chakroborty; 31 March 1977 (age 49); Barrackpore, West Bengal, India
- Occupation: Actor
- Years active: 2007–present
- Spouse: Aparajita Ghosh Das

Ritwick Chakraborty is an Indian film actor who predominantly works in Bengali cinema. He made his debut with Pagal Premi in 2007. He has been a recipient of several West Bengal Film Journalists' Association Awards, Filmfare Awards East and Filmfare Awards Bangla in both Best Actor and Best Actor (Critics') categories.

== Early life ==
Chakraborty was born and brought up in Barrackpore in North Kolkata. He was associated with Bengali theatre from a very early age. He acted in the "Roopkala Kendra" student films directed by his theatre friends. As he grew older he became passionate about acting. He started as a scriptwriter for soap operas but quit it in 2003. After his initial struggle in the Bengali film industry he worked in a few television serials and telefilms directed by Anjan Dutt and Pradipta Bhattacharya. He got his silver screen break with Indraneil Roychowdhury's "Ratul O Rini" but the film was lost in production hell and was never released.

== Career ==
He debuted in the film Pagal Premi. After which, he appeared in Anjan Dutt's cult film Chalo Let's Go, alongside in 2008, followed by Cross Connection with Rimjhim Mitra, Abir Chatterjee and Payel Sarkar, and Raj Chakraborty's Le Chakka, playing the second lead alongside Dev in 2010. He appeared in six films in 2013, and for Shabdo he won the Filmfare East Best Actor's award in 2014. Chakraborty also produced a 2021 Bengali web series named Birohi. His acting pattern highly influenced by Saswata Chatterjee.

== Filmography ==
Key
Denotes films that have not yet been released

Year	Film	Role	Notes	Ref.
2006	Biswas Nao Korte Paren		Short film; This marked Chakraborty's first on-screen appearance	
2007	Pagal Premi	Surya	Debut theatrical film	
2008	Chalo Let's Go	Shekhar		
2009	Cross Connection	Aakash		
2010	Le Chakka	Rajat		
2011	Necklace			
2012	Shabdo	Tarak Dutta		
2013	Phoring			
2013	Aborto	Siddhartha		
2013	Khancha			
2013	Bicycle Kick			
2013	Golemale Pirit Koro Na	Gouranga		
2013	Bakita Byaktigato			
2013	Mahapurush O Kapurush			
2014	Teen Patti			
2014	Ek Phaali Rodh	Swagoto		
2014	Asha Jaoar Majhe			
2015	Ebar Shabor	Pantu Haldar		
2015	Bheetu			
2015	Nirbaak	Mrityunjoy Karmakar		
2015	Anubrato Bhalo acho?			
2015	Bitnoon	Rahul		
2015	Cross Connection 2			
2015	Har Har Byomkesh	Ajit Bandopadhyay		
2016	Pichutaan			
2016	The Violin Player			
2016	Saheb Bibi Golaam	Javed		
2016	Byomkesh Pawrbo	Ajit Bandopadhyay		
2017	Bibaho Diaries			
2017	Chhaya O Chhobi	Jatin Manna / Jeetu		
2017	Chawlochitro Circus			
2017	Asamapta			
2017	Bhalobashar Shohor		Short film	
2017	Maacher Jhol			
2017	Nagarkirtan	Madhu		
2017	Chilekotha			
2018	Rongberonger Korhi	An unnamed client		
2018	Good Night City			
2018	Happy Pill			
2018	Ahare Mon	Michael Tendulkar		
2018	Samsara			
2019	Vinci Da	Adi Bose		
2019	Tarikh	Rudrangshu		
2019	Jyeshthoputro	Partho		
2019	Shantilal O Projapoti Rohoshyo	Shantilal		
2019	Parineeta	Babaida/ Sayan Roy		
2019	Rajlokhi O Srikanto			
2019	Buro Sadhu	Abir		
2019	Teko	Alokesh		
2020	Borunbabur Bondhu			
2020	The Hunger Artist		Short film	
2021	Binisutoy	Kajal		
2021	72 Ghanta			
2022	Ananta			
2022	Dharmajuddho	Raghav		
2023	Mayar Jonjal		Bangladesh-India joint venture	
2023	Tarokar Mrittyu			
2023	Ektu Sore Bosun	Guddu		
2024	Bhootpori	Makhon Chor		
2024	Shontaan	Indranil Bose		
2025	Bhaggyolokkhi	Satya Ganguly		
2025	Oporichito	Ranjan Ghosal		
2025	Shotyi Bole Shotyi Kichhu Nei	Sumit Bhattacharya		
2025	Rabindra Kabya Rahasya	Abhik Bose		
2025	Mrigaya: The Hunt	OC Debanjan Dutta		
2025	Ranna Baati	Shantanu Dasgupta		
2026	Phera	Palash		
2026	Ekhane Ondhokar			
2026	Kabaddi Kabaddi			
2026	Winkle Twinkle	Savyasachi Sen		
2026	Mrigaya 1.5: The Hunt Continues	OC Debanjan Dutta		
2027	Paharganj Halt			
2027	Jadukar Satyacharan			

== Television ==
=== Soap operas ===
- Josh
- Kanakanjali
- Ek Paloke Ektu Dekha
- Bandhan
- Roilo Pherar Nimontron
- Banhisikha
- Goyenda Ginni As himself

=== Telefilms ===
- Kuheli
- Neer Bhanga Jhor
- Neel Simana
- Bhor Bristi

== Web series ==
Key
Denotes web series that have not yet been released

Year	Web series	Role	Director	Platform	Notes	Ref.
2022	Gora	Gourab Sen aka Gora	Sayantan Ghosal	Hoichoi	Season 1	
2022	Mukti	Ram Kinkar Ghosh	Rohan Ghose	ZEE5		
2023	Shabash Feluda	Sashadhar Bose	Arindam Sil	ZEE5		
2023	Gora	Gourab Sen aka Gora	Joydeep Mukherjee	Hoichoi	Season 2	
2023	Abar Proloy	Shombhu Baba / Haru Bag	Raj Chakraborty	ZEE5		
2023	Mr. Kolketa	Kalokallol Dutta aka Mr. Kolke	Surajit Chatterjee	Hoichoi		
2024	Adv. Achinta Aich	Advocate Achinta Aich	Joydeep Mukherjee	Hoichoi	Season 1	
2024	Kolonko	Rongon	Abhimanyu Mukherjee	Hoichoi		
2025	Adv. Achinta Aich	Advocate Achinta Aich	Joydeep Mukherjee	Hoichoi	Season 2	
2025	Karma Korma	Inspector Bhupen Bhaduri	Pratim D. Gupta	Hoichoi		
2026	Adv. Achinta Aich	Advocate Achinta Aich	Joydeep Mukherjee	Hoichoi	Season 3	

== Awards ==
- West Bengal Film Journalists' Association Awards (2023)- Best Actor (Critics' Choice) for Ananta [Winner]
- West Bengal Film Journalists' Association Awards (2022)- Best Actor for Binisutoy [Winner]
- Filmfare Awards East [Winner] (2021)- Best Supporting Actor for Jyeshthoputro (2019) [Winner]
- West Bengal Film Journalists' Association Awards (2020)- Best Actor in a Negative Role for Vinci Da . [Winner]
- West Bengal Film Journalists' Association Awards (2020) - Best Actor for Nagarkirtan [Nominated]
- Filmfare Awards East- Critic's Choice Best Actor Male for Rajlokhi O Srikanto (2019) - [Nominee] (2020)
- West Bengal Film Journalists' Association Awards (2018) Best Actor for Maacher Jhol (2017)- [Nominee]
- Filmfare Awards East(2017)-Best Supporting Actor for Saheb Bibi Golaam (2016) [*Winner*]
- West Bengal Film Journalists' Association Awards (2017) Best Supporting Actor for Saheb Bibi Golaam (2016)-[*Winner*]
- Raindance Film Festival, Jury Prize [Nominee] (2016) Best Actor for The Violin Player (2015)
- Filmfare Awards Bangla (2014)- Best Actor for Shabdo (2012) - *[Winner]*
- "Sera Bangali" Award (2015) by the Anandabazar Patrika
