= Gora (TV series) =

Indian Bengali web series

- Promotional Poster
- Genre: Comedy Crime Thriller
- Created by: Sahana Dutta
- Written by: Sahana Dutta
- Screenplay by: Sahana Dutta
- Directed by: Sayantan Ghosal - Season 1; Joydeep Mukherjee - Season 2
- Creative director: Sahana Dutta
- Starring: Ritwick Chakraborty; Suhotra Mukhopadhyay
- Country of origin: India
- Original language: Bengali
- No. of seasons: 2
- No. of episodes: 16

Production
- Cinematography: Ayan Singha
- Editor: Swarup Sanyal
- Running time: 19-27 minutes
- Production company: Missing Screw

Original release
- Release: 7 January 2022 – present

Gora is an Indian Bengali comedy crime thriller web series streaming on the Bengali OTT platform "Hoichoi". Produced under the banner Missing Screw, the series stars Ritwick Chakraborty in the lead role, in his web series debut, while Ishaa Saha and Suhotra Mukhopadhyay play other pivotal roles. Season 1 of the series has been directed by Sayantan Ghosal while Joydeep Mukherjee has directed the Season 2.

Sahana Dutta served as the creative director for the series, besides being the script and screenplay writer for both the seasons. The music for the series has been composed by Chandril Bhattacharya. The editing has been done by Swarup Sanyal while Ayan Singha handled the cinematography. The film deals with the story of an eccentric detective, who takes on the responsibility to catch a serial killer in Kolkata.

== Overview ==
A serial killer is targeting the literary greats of Kolkata. Private detective Gourab Sen, aka Gora, has a reputation of being a serial-killer specialist. Now it falls upon the eccentric detective to catch the killer.

== Cast ==
- Ritwick Chakraborty as Gourab Sen, aka Gora
- Ishaa Saha as Somlata
- Suhotra Mukhopadhyay as Sarathi, Gora's side-kick and sister's fiancée
- Ananya Sen as Konka, Gora's sister
- Anuradha Roy as Gora's mother
- Abhijit Guha as Inspector Tarapada Sarkhel
- Payel De as Supriya
- Debraj Bhattacharya as Supriya's Brother
- Koushik Chattopadhyay as Tanmoy Talukder, a writer

== Episodes ==
Season	Episodes	Originally released
1	8	January 7, 2022
2	8	June 30, 2023

=== Season 1 (2022) ===
No.	Title	Directed by	Written by	Original release date
1	"Daanter Kolom"	Sayantan Ghosal	Sahana Dutta	January 7, 2022
2	"Maya'r Khela"	Sayantan Ghosal	Sahana Dutta	January 7, 2022
3	"Aparichita"	Sayantan Ghosal	Sahana Dutta	January 7, 2022
4	"Anadhikar Prabesh"	Sayantan Ghosal	Sahana Dutta	January 7, 2022
5	"Kaalmrigaya"	Sayantan Ghosal	Sahana Dutta	January 7, 2022
6	"Shesher Ratri"	Sayantan Ghosal	Sahana Dutta	January 7, 2022
7	"Shasti"	Sayantan Ghosal	Sahana Dutta	January 7, 2022
8	"Samapti"	Sayantan Ghosal	Sahana Dutta	January 7, 2022

=== Season 2 (2023) ===
No.	Title	Directed by	Written by	Original release date
1	"Paatri Chai."	Joydeep Mukherjee	Sahana Dutta	June 30, 2023
2	"Paagri Pasand Hua!"	Joydeep Mukherjee	Sahana Dutta	June 30, 2023
3	"Too Many Women!"	Joydeep Mukherjee	Sahana Dutta	June 30, 2023
4	"Hok Kinara, Mrs. Gora."	Joydeep Mukherjee	Sahana Dutta	June 30, 2023
5	"Payer Tolay Shorshe."	Joydeep Mukherjee	Sahana Dutta	June 30, 2023
6	"Shesher Kobita."	Joydeep Mukherjee	Sahana Dutta	June 30, 2023
7	"Prize Kobe Debe?."	Joydeep Mukherjee	Sahana Dutta	June 30, 2023
8	"Aaloy Kaate Andhokar."	Joydeep Mukherjee	Sahana Dutta	June 30, 2023

== Reception ==
=== Critical reception ===
==== Season 1 ====
Madhumanti Pait Chowdhury rated the series 5.5 out of 10 stars and wrote "The film ends being a juxtaposition of a huge number of could have beens." She mentioned that the film is good but could have done better. She applauded Ritwick's performance as Gora, his appearance in the series, Ritwick's camaraderie with Suhotra and the performance of the remaining ensemble cast. But she criticized the weak character development for Ritwick's character, vague subplot, over-lengthy scenes and the poor execution.

Archi Sengupta of Leisure Byte rated the series 3.5/5 stars and noted "Gora series flows well, the mystery is tight and the interactions between the detective and the sidekick are mostly hilarious, sans some disturbing verbal and physical abuse." She praised the comedy in the series, the rapport between Ritwick and Suhtra's characters, the short runtime, well written murders, Suhotra's performance, the suspense maintained throughout the series and the production quality. But she criticised the over display of eccentricities, the usage of an age-old reason for a revenge and the multiple loopholes in the storyline. High on Films and OTTplay have also given mixed reviews to the series.

==== Season 2 ====
Poorna Banerjee of The Times of India rated the series 3/5 stars and highlighted "Ritwick-Suhotra’s duo is quite naturally magnetic, but the end is quite rushed and could have been explained and formed better." She praised Sahana Dutta for writing the character of Gora in a way that reduces the seriousness and brutality of a situation and the poetic dialogues but bemoaned Gora's over forgetfulness, unnecessary confusion, unaddressed loopholes in the plot, excessive editing, overacting on Ritwick's part, Ushashie Ray's weak performance and the overdone theatrics in certain parts.
