= 4th WBFJA Awards =

Indian Award

- Date: 13 jan 2020

Highlights
- Best Film: Nagarkirtan
- Best Direction: Kaushik Ganguly
- Best Actor: Riddhi Sen
- Best Actress: Subhashree Ganguly

The 4th ceremony of West Bengal Film Journalists' Association Awards, honoring best movies of the past year, took place on Jan 14, 2020.

Nagarkirtan became the most awarded movie of the ceremony winning 8 awards including Best Film, Best Actor and Best Director.

== Winners & Nominations ==
=== Best Film ===
Title	Director	Producers	Studio
Nagarkirtan	Kaushik Ganguly	Snigdha Basu	Acropoliis Entertainment
Vinci Da	Srijit Mukherji	Shrikant Mohta, Mahendra Soni	Shree Venkatesh Films
Kedara	Indraadip Dasgupta	Samiran Das	Kaleidoscope
Ghawre Bairey Aaj	Aparna Sen	Shrikant Mohta, Mahendra Soni	Shree Venkatesh Films
Urojahaj	Buddhadeb Dasgupta	Amy Ghosh, Buddhadeb Dasgupta	Buddhadeb Dagupta Productions
Tarikh	Churni Ganguly	Suparnokanti Karati	Opera Movies

◆ Other Best Film Winners

=== Best Director ===
Name	Title
Kaushik Ganguly	Nagarkirtan
Srijit Mukherji	Vinci Da
Aparna Sen	Ghawre Bairey Aaj
Dhrubo Banerjee	Durgeshgorer Guptodhon
Buddhadeb Dasgupta	Urojahaj
Churni Ganguly	Tarikh

◆ Other Best Director Winners

=== Best Actor ===
Name	Title
Riddhi Sen	Nagarkirtan
Ritwick Chakraborty	Nagarkirtan
Rudranil Ghosh	Vinci Da
Prosenjit Chatterjee	Drishtikone
Shiboprosad Mukherjee	Konttho
Kaushik Ganguly	Kedara

◆ Other Best Actor Winners

=== Best Actress ===
Name	Title
Subhashree Ganguly	Parineeta
Koneenica Banerjee	Mukherjee Dar Bou
Anashua Majumdar	Mukherjee Dar Bou
Raima Sen	Tarikh
Paoli Dam	Sanjhbati

◆ Other Best Actress Winner

=== Best Actor in a Supporting Role ===
Name	Title
Rudranil Ghosh	Kedara
Shubhomoy Chatterjee	Mahalaya
Anirban Bhattacharya	Finally Bhalobasha
Anjan Dutt	Surjo Prithibir Chardike Ghore
Jisshu Sengupta	Mahalaya

◆ Other Best Actor in a Supporting Role Winners

=== Best Actress in a Supporting Role ===
Name	Title	
Lily Chakravarty	Sanjhbati	Tied
Sudipta Chakraborty	Jyestoputro	Tied
Rituparna Sengupta	Mukherjee Dar Bou	
Swastika Mukherjee	Shah Jahan Regency	
Daminee Benny Basu	Jyestoputro	

◆ Other Best Actress in a Supporting Role Winners

=== Best Promising Director ===
Name	Title
Indraadip Dasgupta	Kedara
Pritha Chakroborty	Mukherjee Dar Bou
Shieladitya Moulik	Sweater
Sudipto Roy	Kia and Cosmos
Sayantan Ghosal	Jawker Dhan
Pradipta bhattacharya	Rajlokkhi O Shrikanto

=== Best Promising Actor ===
Name	Title	
Sayan Ghosh	Rajlokkhi O Shrikanto	Tied
Suprabhat Das	Finally Bhalobasha	Tied

=== Best Promising Actress ===
Name	Title
Tuhina Das	Ghawre Bairey Aaj
Anuradha Mukherjee	Sweater
Ritwika Pal	Kia and Cosmos

=== Best Popular Film ===
Title	Director
Durgeshgorer Guptodhon	Dhrubo Banerjee
Konttho	Shiboprosad Mukherjee & Nandita Roy
Gumnaami	Srijit Mukherji
Mitin Mashi	Arindam Sil
Professor Shonku O El Dorado	Sandip Ray
Sanjhbati	Leena Gangopadhyay

=== Best Popular Actor ===
Name	Title	
Dev	Sanjhbati	Tied
Prosenjit Chatterjee	Gumnaami	Tied
Abir Chatterjee	Durgeshgorer Guptodhon	
Rituparna Sengupta	Ahaa Re	
Anirban Bhattacharya	Ghawre Bairey Aaj	
Koel Mallick	Mitin Mashi	

=== Best Actor in a Negative Role ===
Name	Title
Ritwick Chakraborty	Vinci Da
Ritabhari Chakraborty	Shesh Theke Shuru
Jisshu Sengupta	Ghawre Bairey Aaj
Rahul Banerjee	Rajlokhi O Srikanto

=== Best Actor in a Comic Role ===
Name	Title
Anirban Bhattacharya	Bibaho Obhijaan
Amit Saha	Buro Sadhu

=== Best Screenplay ===
Name	Title
Kaushik Ganguly	Nagarkirtan
Churni Ganguly	Tarikh
Srijato	Kedara
Srijit Mukherji	Gumnaami
Buddhadeb Dasgupta	Urojahaj

=== Best Cinematographer ===
Name	Title
Subhankar Bhar	Kedara
Soumik Haldar	Gumnaami
Ashim Bose	Urojahaj
Ranjan Palit	Purba Paschim Dakshin
Shirsha Ray	Nagarkirtan

=== Best Editor ===
Name	Title
Subhajit Singha	Nagarkirtan
Subhajit Singha	Tarikh
Pranoy Dasgupta	Gumnaami
Sujay Dutta roy	Kedara
Sanglap bhowmik	Mitin Mashi

=== Best Art Director ===
Name	Title
Shibaji Pal	Gumnaami
Shibaji Pal	Vinci Da
Ranajit Gharai	Kedara
Tanmoy Chakroborty	Mukhomukhi
