= West Bengal Film Journalists' Association Award for Best Actress in a Supporting Role =

Annual Indian film award

WBFJA for Best Actress in a Supporting Role
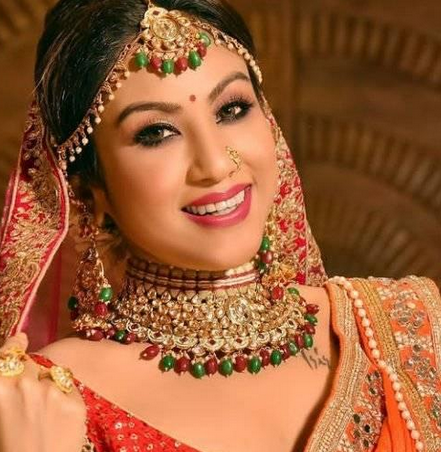
- 2026 Recipient Chandreyee Ghosh
- Awarded for: Best Performance by an Actress in a Supporting Role
- Country: India
- Presented by: West Bengal Film Journalists' Association
- Final award: 2024
- Most Recent Winner: Chandreyee Ghosh for Lokkhikantopur Local and Sauraseni Maitra for Shotyi Bole Shotyi Kichhu Nei

The West Bengal Film Journalists' Association Award for Best Actress in a Supporting Role is given yearly by WBFJA as a part of its annual West Bengal Film Journalists' Association Awards for Bengali films, to recognise the female performer who has delivered an outstanding performance in a supporting role.

== Superlatives ==
Category	Name	#
Most awards	Mamata Shankar and Paoli Dam	2
Most Nominated	Sudipta Chakraborty	3

== Winners and Nominees ==
Year (Note: Refers to the year in which the ceremony was held.)	Photos of winners	Actor	Role(s)	Film
2017 (1st)		Aparajita Auddy ‡	Malini "Molly" Mukherjee	Praktan
2017 (1st)		Anjana Basu	Madhuja Banerjee	Abhimaan
2017 (1st)		Churni Ganguly	Antara	Bastu-Shaap
2017 (1st)		Sudipta Chakraborty	Ms. Bonhi	Shororipu
2018 (2nd)		Mamata Shankar ‡	Dev D's Mother	Maacher Jhol
2018 (2nd)		Neha Panda	Sarah	The Bongs Again
2018 (2nd)		Sudipta Chakraborty	Mallika	Mayurakshi
2018 (2nd)		Tanusree Chakraborty	Manashi S. Basak	Durga Sohay
2019 (3rd)		Churni Ganguly ‡	Rumki J. Mitra	Drishtikone
2019 (3rd)		Aparajita Auddy	Miss Arundhati	Haami
2019 (3rd)		Bidipta Chakraborty	Nabin Chandra's Mother	Rosogolla
2019 (3rd)		Koneenica Banerjee	Shyamali Rakshit	Haami
2019 (3rd)		Rituparna Sengupta	Unnamed	Rongberonger Korhi
2019 (3rd)		Sreelekha Mitra	Pari Pishi	Rainbow Jelly
2020 (4th)	–	Lily Chakravarty ‡	Sulekha Mitra	Sanjhbati
2020 (4th)	–	Sudipta Chakraborty ‡	Ila Ganguly	Jyeshthoputro
2020 (4th)	–	Daminee Benny Basu	Parul Ganguly	Jyeshthoputro
2020 (4th)	–	Rituparna Sengupta	Aratrika Bhattacharya	Mukherjee Dar Bou
2020 (4th)	–	Swastika Mukherjee	Kamalini Guha	Shah Jahan Regency
2021 (5th)	–	Bidipta Chakraborty ‡	Sabita	Dracula Sir
2021 (5th)	–	Paoli Dam ‡	Kalki Maitra	Love Aaj Kal Porshu
2021 (5th)	–	Ankita Chakraborty	Sex Worker	Shironam
2021 (5th)	–	Debjani Chatterjee	Mrs. Renu	Guldasta
2021 (5th)	–	Soma Chakraborty	Amarabati	Brahma Janen Gopon Kommoti
2022 (5th)	–	Alokananda Roy ‡	Malini's Mother	Ekannoborti
2022 (5th)	–	Poulami Basu	Sreemati Chatterjee	Dictionary
2023 (6th)		Paoli Dam ‡	Sulachana	Byomkesh Hatyamancha
2023 (6th)		Anashua Majumdar	Mrs. Shurbhi	Boudi Canteen
2023 (6th)		Anjana Basu	Pubali Chatterjee	Kishmish
2023 (6th)		Sneha Chatterjee	Safeena	Bismillah
2023 (6th)		Tanusree Chakraborty	Ruchira Dev	Abar Kanchanjungha
2024 (7th)		Mamata Shankar ‡	Mamata Sen	Palan
2024 (7th)		Ananya Sen	Putul	Dilkhush
2024 (7th)		Anindita Bose	Ayesha	Aaro Ek Prithibi
2024 (7th)		Jaya Ahsan	Meghna Mustafi	Ardhangini
2025 (8th)		Swastika Dutta ‡	Swatilekha Sen	Alaap
2025 (8th)		Sanjita Mukherjee	Sarathi Sardar	Doaansh
2026 (9th)		Chandreyee Ghosh ‡	Malati	Lokkhikantopur Local
2026 (9th)		Sauraseni Maitra ‡	Arundhuti	Shotyi Bole Shotyi Kichhu Nei
2026 (9th)		Sohini Sengupta	Sreemati Roy	Grihapravesh
2026 (9th)		Sohini Sarkar	Gunja	Raghu Dakat
2026 (9th)		Devlina Kumar		Raas

== See also ==
- West Bengal Film Journalists' Association Award for Best Actress
- West Bengal Film Journalists' Association Award for Best Actor
- West Bengal Film Journalists' Association Awards
- Cinema of India
