= West Bengal Film Journalists' Association Award for Best Actor in a Supporting Role =

Annual Indian film award

WBFJA for Best Actor in a Supporting Role
- Awarded for: Best Performance by an Actor in a Supporting Role
- Country: India
- Presented by: West Bengal Film Journalists' Association
- Final award: 2026
- Most Recent Winner: Rudranil Ghosh for Dhumketu

The West Bengal Film Journalists' Association Award for Best Actor in a Supporting Role is given by WBFJA as a part of its annual West Bengal Film Journalists' Association Awards for Bengali films, to recognize the best actor in a film released in the previous year.

== Superlatives ==
Category	Name	Superlative
Most Award	Kaushik Ganguly, Rudranil Ghosh	2 awards each
Most Nominated	Rudranil Ghosh, Kaushik Sen, Ritwick Chakraborty, Paran Bandopadhyay	3 nominations each

== List of Winners ==
Year	Title	Movie
2017	Ritwick Chakraborty	Saheb Bibi Golam
2018	Kaushik Ganguly	Bishorjan
2019	Anjan Dutt	Uma
2020	Rudranil Ghosh	Kedara
2021	Paran Bandopadhyay	Borunbabur Bondhu
2022		
2023	Shyamal Chakraborty	Ballabhpurer Roopkotha
2024	Kaushik Ganguly	Aaro Ek Prithibi
2025	Silajit Majumdar	Ajogyo
2026	Rudranil Ghosh	Dhumketu

== Nominations ==
=== 2017 ===
- Ritwick Chakraborty for Saheb Bibi Golam
- Arun Guhathakurta for Cinemawala
- Dev for Zulfiqar
- Jisshu Sengupta for Kelor Kirti
- Rahul Banerjee for Khawto

=== 2018 ===
- Kaushik Ganguly for Bishorjan
- Paran Bandopadhyay for Posto
- Kaushik Sen for Durga Sohay
- Bratya Basu for Asamapta
- Rana Mitra for Messi
- Ritwick Chakraborty for Chhaya O Chhobi

=== 2019 ===
- Anjan Dutt for Uma
- Soham Chakraborty for Rongberonger Korhi
- Arjun Chakrabarty in Guptodhoner Sandhane
- Adil Hussain in Ahare Mon
- Kamaleshwar Mukherjee in Pupa
- Shantilal Mukherjee in Bagh Bondhi Khela

=== 2020 ===
- Rudranil Ghosh for Kedara
- Shubhomoy Chatterjee for Mahalaya
- Anirban Bhattacharya for Finally Bhalobasha
- Anjan Dutt for Surjo Prithibir Chardike Ghore
- Jisshu Sengupta for Mahalaya

=== 2021 ===
- Paran Bandopadhyay for Borunbabur Bondhu
- Rwitobroto Mukherjee for Dwitiyo Purush
- Padmanabha Dasgupta for Sraboner Dhara
- Sumanta Mukherjee for Saheber Cutlet
- Sourav Das forCheeni

=== 2023 ===
Sources:

- Shyamal Chakraborty for Ballabhpurer Roopkotha
- Ambarish Bhattacharya for Lokkhi Chele
- Kharaj Mukherjee for Kishmish
- Prantik Banerjee for Hridpindo
- Rudranil Ghosh for Abhijaan

=== 2024 ===
- Kaushik Ganguly for Aaro Ek Prithibi
- Ambarish Bhattacharya for Kaberi Antardhan
- Indrasish Roy for Maayakumari
- Kaushik Sen for Kaberi Antardhan
- Vikram Chatterjee for Shesh Pata

=== 2025 ===
- Silajit Majumdar – Ajogyo as Raktim Majumdar
- Anirban Chakrabarti – Chaalchitro: The Frame Fatale as Naseer
- Indraneil Sengupta – Hubba as Dibakar Sen
- Paran Bandopadhyay – Shri Swapankumarer Badami Hyenar Kobole as Swapan Kumar
- Ritwick Chakraborty – Shontaan as Indranil "Bablu" Bose

=== 2026 ===
- Rudranil Ghosh – Dhumketu as Jogesh
- Kaushik Sen – Sharthopor as Sourav Basu
- Bratya Basu – Mayanagar as Bubu
- Amit Saha – The Academy of Fine Arts as Bireshwar Bal
- Korak Samanta – Dhrubor Aschorjo Jibon as Nandi

== See also ==
- West Bengal Film Journalists' Association Award for Best Actor
- West Bengal Film Journalists' Association Award for Best Actress
- West Bengal Film Journalists' Association Awards
- Cinema of India
