= 5th WBFJA Awards =

Indian film awards

2020-2021 WBFJA Awards
- Awarded for: Excellence in Indian Bengali cinema
- Announced on: Nominations: 31 August 2021
- Presented on: 16 January 2022
- Date: 16 January 2022
- Organised by: West Bengal Film Journalists’ Association (WBFJA)
- Official website: WBFJA

Highlights
- Best Film: Borunbabur Bondhu
- Best Direction: Anik Dutta
- Best Actor: Parambrata Chatterjee, Saswata Chatterjee
- Best Actress: Aparajita Auddy

5th Edition of The WBFJA Awards, also known as 'Cinemar Samabartan' (Convocation of Cinema or Carnival of Films) took place on 16 January 2022 honoring best movies of the past two years.

== Theme & Outline ==
Called 'Cinemar Samabartan' (Convocation of Cinema or Carnival of Films), the festival will have the tag line 'Cinemar Moja Cinemar Hall E' (you can truly enjoy the charm of films by watching on big screen) as the campaign to bring back the audience to the cinema halls and multiplexes which is incomparable with OTT.

== Lifetime Achievement ==
The Lifetime Achievement award for WBFJA 2021 was given to Victor Banerjee.

== Winners and Nominees ==
=== Best Film ===
TItle	Director	Producer	Studio
Borunbabur Bondhu	Anik Dutta	Nispal Singh	Surinder Films
Dwitiyo Purush	Srijit Mukherjee	Mahendra Soni, Shrikant Mohta	Shree Venkatesh Films
Abyakto	Arjun Dutta	Tarun Das	Trina Films, Roop Production & Entertainment
Sraboner Dhara	Sudeshna Roy, Abhijit Guha	Pradip Churiwal	Macneil Engineering Ltd
Dracula Sir	Debaloy Bhattacharya	Mahendra Soni, Shrikant Mohta	Shree Venkatesh Films

=== Best Director ===
Name	Title
Anik Dutta	Borunbabur Bondhu
Srijit Mukherjee	Dwitiyo Purush
Sudeshna Roy, Abhijit Guha	Sraboner Dhara
Debaloy Bhattacharya	Dracula Sir
Mainak Bhaumick	Cheeni

=== Best Actor (Male) ===
Name	Title
Parambrata Chatterjee	Dwitiyo Purush
Saswata Chatterjee	Chobiyal
Anirban Bhattacharya	Dracula Sir
Jeet	Asur

◆ Other Best Actor Winners

=== Best Actor (Female) ===
Name	Title
Aparajita Adhya	Cheeni
Arpita Chatterjee	Abyakto
Rituparna Sengupta	Parcel
Swastika Mukherjee	Guldasta
Rukmini Mitra	Switzerland

=== Most Popular Actor ===
Name	Title
Anirban Bhattacharya	Dwitiyo Purush
Mimi Chakraborty	Dracula Sir
Koel Mallick	Rawkto Rawhoshyo

=== Most Popular Film ===
Title	Director	Studio
Dwitiyo Purush	Srijit Mukherjee	Shree Venkatesh Films
Asur	Pavel Bhattacharjee	Jeetz Filmworks
Brahma Janen Gopon Kommoti	Aritra Mukherjee	Windows Production
Cheeni	Mainak Bhaumick	Shree Venkatesh Films

=== Best Supporting Actor (Male) ===
Name	Title
Paran Bandopadhyay	Borunbabur Bondhu
Rwitobroto Mukherjee	Dwitiyo Purush
Padmanabha Dasgupta	Sraboner Dhara
Sumanta Mukherjee	Saheber Cutlet
Sourav Das	Cheeni

=== Best Supporting Actor (female) ===
Name	Title
Paoli Dam	Love Aaj Kal Porshu
Bidipta Chakroborty	Dracula Sir
Soma Chakroborty	Brahma Janen Gopon Kommoti
Ankita Chakroborty	Shironam
Debjani Chatterjee	Guldasta

=== Most Promosing Actress ===
Name	Title
Ritabhari Chakraborty	Brahma Janen Gopon Kommoti
Sritama Dey	Saheber Cutlet
Madhumita Sarcar	Cheeni

=== Most Promising Director ===
Name	Title
Arjunn Dutta	Abyakto
Aritra Mukherjee	Brahma Janen Gopon Kommoti
Indranil Ghosh	Shironam
Ujjwal Basu	Doodhpither Gachh
Souvik Kundu	Switzerland

=== Best Actor in a Negative Role ===
Name	Title
Abir Chatterjee	Asur
Rudranil Ghosh	Dracula Sir
Chandan Roy Sanyal	Rawkto Rawhoshyo

=== Best Actor in a Comic Role ===
Name	Title
Manasi Sinha	Brahma Janen Gopon Kommoti
Kanchan Mullick	Saheber Cutlet

=== Best Music Director ===
Name	Title
Anupam Roy	Dwitiyo Purush
Bickram Ghosh	Asur
Arindom Chatterjee	Love Aaj Kal Porshu
Amit & Ishan	Dracula Sir
Anindya Chatterjee	Brahma Janen Gopon Kommoti

=== Best Playback Singer (Male) ===
Name	Title	Song
Ishan	Dracula Sir	"Raat Pohale"
Mohammed Irfan	Asur	''Tor hoye jete chai"
Arijit Singh	Dwitiyo Purush	"Abar Phire Ele"
Dev Arijit	Love Aaj Kal Porshu	''Shune Ne"
Ishan	Dracula Sir	"Shono Ami Abar Jonmo Nebo"

=== Best Playback Singer (Female) ===
Name	Title	Song
Surangana Bandyopadhyay	Brahma Janen Gopon Kommoti	"Kon Gopone"
Iman Chakraborty	Asur	"Aami Radha Moto"
Subhamita Banerjee	Cheeni	"Ki Naamey Daaki"
Lagnajita Chakraborty	Cheeni	"Tomar Chokher Shitalpati"

=== Best Lyrics ===
Name	Title	Song
Anindya Chatterjee	Brahma Janen Gopon Kommoti	"Kon Gopone"
Anupam Roy	Dwitiyo Purush	"Abar Phire Ele"
Ritam Sen	Dracula Sir	"Priyotoma"
Saqi Banerjee	Dracula Sir	"Shono Ami Abar Jonmo Nebo"
Ritam Sen	Cheeni	"Tomar Chokher Shitalpati"

=== Best Screenplay ===
Name	Title
Srijit Mukherjee	Dwitiyo Purush
Arjunn Dutta	Abyakto
Anik Dutta & Utsav Mukherjee	Borunbabur Bondhu
Zinia Sen	Brahma Janen Gopon Kommoti
Kallol Lahiri & Debaloy Bhattacharya	Dracula Sir

=== Best Cinematographer ===
Name	Title
Sirsha Ray	Shironam
Soumik Haldar	Dwitiyo Purush
Supratim Bhol	Abyakto
Indanath Marick	Dracula Sir
Santanu Banerjee	Doodhpither Gachh

=== Best Editor ===
Name	Title
Arghakamal Mitra	Borunbabur Bondhu
Pronoy Dasgupta	Dwitiyo Purush
Sanglap Bhowmick	Love Aaj Kal Porshu
Sanglap Bhowmick	Dracula Sir
Anirban Maity	Doodhpither Gachh

=== Best Art Director ===
Name	Title
Ananda Addhya	Asur
Shibaji Pal	Dwitiyo Purush
Indranil Ghosh	Shironam
Tapan Kumar Seth	Dracula Sir

=== Best Background Score ===
Name	Title
Joy Sarkar	Doodhpither Gachh
Soumya Rit	Abyakto
Avijit Kundu	Love Aaj Kal Porshu
Amit & Ishan	Dracula Sir

=== Best Sound Designer ===
Name	Title
Anindit Roy & Adeep Singh Manki	Dwitiyo Purush
Hindol Chakraborty	Shironam
Divya	Dracula Sir
Anirban Ganguly	Doodhpither Gachh

=== Best Makeup ===
Name	Title
Manjeet Tiwari	Asur
Somnath Kundu	Dwitiyo Purush
Prosenjit Banerjee	Guldasta
Prasenjit Dey	Dracula Sir
Sandeep Neogi & Dipankar Chakraborty	Abyakto

=== Best Costume ===
Name	Title
Abhishek Roy	Guldasta
Sanchita Bhattacharya	Dwitiyo Purush
Baisakhi Banerjee & Sandy Ghoshal	Dracula Sir
Apu Gobinda Mondal	Doodhpither Gachh
