= West Bengal Film Journalists' Association Award for Best Male Playback Singer =

Annual Indian film award

The West Bengal Film Journalists' Association Award for Best Male Playback Singer is given by WBFJA as a part of its annual West Bengal Film Journalists' Association Awards for Bengali films. The award recognizes the best male playback singer for Bengali films released in the previous year.

== Superlatives ==
Category	Name	Superlative
Most Awards	Arijit Singh; Anupam Roy	2 awards
Most Nominations	Arijit Singh	8 nominations
Most Nominations without a Win	Raj Barman; Neel Dutt; Papon	2 nominations

== List of winners ==
- 2017 Nachiketa Chakraborty – "Ek Purono Mosjide" from Zulfiqar
  - Arijit Singh – "Tomake Chai" from Gangster
  - Anupam Roy – "Kolkata" from Praktan
  - Jeet Gannguli – "Aaj Amay" from Power
  - Vicky A Khan – "Awaara Dil" from Ki Kore Toke Bolbo
- 2018 Arijit Singh – "Maula Re" from Chaamp
  - Arijit Singh – "Dugga Ma" from Bolo Dugga Maiki
  - Anupam Roy – "Ahare Mon" from Projapoti Biskut
  - Nachiketa Chakraborty – "Keno Erokom Kichu Holo Na" from Posto
  - Neel Dutt – "E Sohor" from The Bongs Again
- 2019 Anupam Roy – "Aamar Dukkho Gulo" from Drishtikone
  - Rupam Islam – "Girlfriend Title Track" from Girlfriend
  - Shreyan Bhattacharya – "Bhutu Bhaijaan" from Haami
  - Rupankar Bagchi – "Jaago Jaago Uma" from Uma
  - Sudipto Chowdhury – "Tor Sathe" from Generation Ami
  - Raj Barman – "Sudhu Tui" from Villain
  - Anindya Bose – "Ki Debo Bol Toke" from Kaya
  - Arnab Dutta – "Tapur Tupur" from Rosogolla
- 2020 Anirban Bhattacharya – "Kicchu Chaini Aami" from Shah Jahan Regency
  - Neel Dutt – "Chhiley Bondhu" from Finally Bhalobasha
  - Anupam Roy – "Alote Alote Dhaka" from Konttho
  - Papon – "Hazar Bochor" from Tritiya Adhyay
  - Raj Barman – "Keno Je Toke Pahara" from Mon Jane Na
  - Timir Biswas – "Amar Bhul Hoye Geche Priyo" from Rajlokhi O Srikanto
- 2021 Ishan Mitra - "Raat Pohale" from Dracula Sir
  - Mohammed Irfan - "Tor hoye jete chai" from Asur
  - Arijit Singh - "Abar Phire Ele" from Dwitiyo Purush
  - Dev Arijit - "Shune Ne" from Love Aaj Kal Porshu
  - Ishan Mitra - "Shono Ami Abar Jonmo Nebo" from Dracula Sir
- 2022 Anindya Chatterjee - "Tomar E Toh Kachhe" from Prem Tame and Shovon Ganguly - "Rasher Gaan" from Golondaaj
  - Mahtim Shakib - "Takey Olpo Kache Dakchhi" from Prem Tame
  - Surojeet Mukherjee - "Baburam Shapure" from Tangra Blues
  - Ishan Mitra - "Mayar Kangal" from Olpo Holeo Sotti
  - Anindya Chatterjee - "Tonic - Title Track" from Tonic
- 2023 Arijit Singh - "Bhalobashar Morshum" from X=Prem and Saptak Sanai Das - "Cindrella Mon" from X=Prem
  - Arijit Singh - "Oboseshe" from Kishmish
  - Anupam Roy - "Sohage Adore" from Belashuru
  - Papon - "Kanna" from Kishmish
  - Sonu Nigam - "Mukti" from Kacher Manush
- 2024 Anupam Roy for "Ami Sei Manushta Aarnei" from Dawshom Awbotaar
  - Manomay Bhattacharya for "Chokher Jole" from Maayakumari
  - Arijit Singh for "Jiya Tui Chhara" from Biye Bibhrat
  - Anirban Bhattacharya for "Bibagi Phone" from Dilkhush
- 2025 Rathijit Bhattacharya for "Kishori" from Khadaan and Timir Biswas for "Taasher Deshe" from Tekka
  - Anupam Roy for "Ajogyo Ami" from Ajogyo
  - Arijit Singh for "Keu Janbe Na" from Ajogyo
  - Rupankar Bagchi for "Mon Kharaper Gaan" from Oti Uttam
- 2026 Armaan Rashid Khan for "Saiyaan Bina" from Grihapravesh
  - Ishan Mitra for "Jhilmil Laage Re" from Raghu Dakat
  - Durnibar Saha for "Shaatjawnmer Porichoy" from Killbill Society
  - Debayan Banerjee for "Meghpeon" from Grihapravesh
  - Jeet Gannguli for "Hasli Keno Bol" from Projapati 2

== See also ==
- West Bengal Film Journalists' Association Awards
- Cinema of India
