= Obhishopto Nighty =

2014 Indian Bengali film

- Directed by: Birsa Dasgupta
- Written by: Debaloy Bhattacharya
- Produced by: Shrikant Mohta
- Starring: Paoli Dam; Indraneil Sengupta; Parambrata Chattopadhyay; Tanusree Chakraborty
- Cinematography: Soumik Haldar
- Edited by: Bodhaditya Banerjee
- Music by: Indraadip Das Gupta
- Production company: Shree Venkatesh Films
- Release date: 14 February 2014
- Running time: 112 minutes
- Country: India
- Language: Bengali

Obhishopto Nighty is a 2014 Indian Bengali Adult comedy-thriller film directed by Birsa Dasgupta and produced by Shrikant Mohta under the banner of Shree Venkatesh Films.

== Plot ==
The story of this film revolves around a cursed nightie which changes hands in a logical manner, not magically. The original owner of the nightie had experienced unfulfilled love, which ultimately led to a curse on it.

A wannabe actress comes to Kolkata from a village in pursue of her career. She can cross all limits in order to become successful. She uses that nightie for seducing producers and she doesn't regret in what she is doing. The events that take place later form the climax of the story.

== Cast ==
- Paoli Dam as Monica
- Indraneil Sengupta as Raja/Alok
- Parambrata Chatterjee as Aparesh aka Apu
- Tanusree Chakraborty as Brishti/Apsara
- Rahul Banerjee as Boishakh
- Priyanka Sarkar as Jumela 'Jhumi'
- Neel Mukherjee as Parimal Dutta (Censor Board Chief)
- Debaloy Bhattacharya as Madhumoy Pal aka Modhu Da aka 'Gossip Queen Modhu'
- Bhaskar Banerjee as Bimal Hore
- Paran Bandyopadhyay as Manik Mukherji (Film & Theatre Personality)
- Supriyo Dutta as Sushil Nandy (Fire Brigade Minister)
- Kanchan Mullick as Basanto Kundu (Businessman of Chit Fund)
- Locket Chatterjee as Suchhanda (Parimal's wife)
- Mir Afsar Ali as RSJ
- Sumit Samaddar as Banchha
- Laboni Sarkar as Bonolakshmi Tagore (Hore) aka 'Bonu'
- Jojo Mukherjee as Miss Boshikoron
- Tanima Sen as Parimal's mother
- Sudeshna Roy as Kaushalya Sarbanam (Sociologist & Censor Board Member)
- Abhijeet Guha as Manoj Jana (Psychiatrist)
- Dev in a cameo appearance

== Soundtrack ==
Obhishopto Nighty

Soundtrack album by Indraadip Dasgupta
- Released: 1 January 2014
- Genre: Feature film soundtrack
- Language: Bengali
- Label: SVF

Indraadip Das Gupta was roped in to compose the film score of Obhishopto Nighty.

Tracklist
No.	Title	Lyrics	Singer(s)	Length
1.	"Roddur" (Male)	Srijato	Papon	02:44
2.	"Roddur" (Female)	Srijato	Antara Mitra	02:44
3.	"Sadher Lighty"	Srijato	Arijit Singh, Mohan Kannan, Samidh Mukherjee & Indraadip Dasgupta.	03:02
4.	"Ei Toh Shobe Shuru"	Prasen & Deepangshu.	Monali Thakur	01:52
5.	"Amar Bou Palalo"	Bodhaditya Banerjee	Indraadip Dasgupta, Bodhaditya Banerjee	03:02
