= Montu Pilot =

Indian web series

- Release poster
- Genre: Drama, Romance
- Directed by: Debaloy Bhattacharya
- Country of origin: India
- Original language: Bengali
- No. of seasons: 3
- No. of episodes: 26

Production
- Production company: Star Entertainment Pvt. Ltd

Original release
- Release: 13 December 2019 – 3 March 2026

Montu Pilot is Bengali web series directed by Debaloy Bhattacharya that features Saurav Das, Solanki Roy, Chandreyee Ghosh, Kanchan Mullick and Subrata Dutta in the main roles.

== Description ==
Directed by Debaloy Bhattacharya, the teaser was released on 19 November 2019. On 1 December the official trailer of Montu Pilot released on the Bengali OTT platform Hoichoi.

The series is about the character Montu who wanted to be a pilot in his childhood. His mother tried everything to take him out from the red-light area of Neelkuthi but failed and met a terrible end. Montu becomes a pimp, a transporter of escorts, and he does not understand love and cannot feel sensitive emotions. However, his life changes when he meets Bhromor.

== Cast ==
- Saurav Das as Montu Pilot
- Solanki Roy as Bhromor
- Chandrayee Ghosh as Bibijaan
- Kanchan Mullick as Taufik
- Subrat Dutta as Doctor
- Alivia Sarkar as Shoroma
- Rafiath Rashid Mithila as Bonhi
- Suzi Bhowmik as Transgender Brothel worker

== Episodes ==
Series	Episodes	Originally released
1	9	13 December 2019
2	10	29 April 2022
3	7	4 March 2026

== Season 1 (2019) ==
Montu Pilot started streaming on hoichoi on 13 December 2019 with five episodes.

=== Episodes ===
No.	Title	Directed by	Original release date
1	"Ghoretey Bhromor Elo"	Debaloy Bhattacharya	13 December 2019
2	"Welcome to Neelkuthi"	Debaloy Bhattacharya	13 December 2019
3	"Kothae Montu Pilot"	Debaloy Bhattacharya	13 December 2019
4	"Bhromor O Badal"	Debaloy Bhattacharya	13 December 2019
5	"Noroker Khojey"	Debaloy Bhattacharya	13 December 2019
6	"Rakta Bonya"	Debaloy Bhattacharya	20 December 2019
7	"Daktaar Babu"	Debaloy Bhattacharya	20 December 2019
8	"Shukhi Poribar"	Debaloy Bhattacharya	20 December 2019
9	"Mrityu Pothey"	Debaloy Bhattacharya	20 December 2019

== Season 2 (2022) ==
Montu Pilot Season 2 started premiered on Hoichoi on 29 April 2022.

=== Episodes ===
No.	Title	Directed by	Original release date
1	"Neelkuthir Rajkumar"	Debaloy Bhattacharya	29 April 2022
2	"Chokher Bodole Chokh"	Debaloy Bhattacharya	29 April 2022
3	"Neelkuthir Parl"	Debaloy Bhattacharya	29 April 2022
4	"Ekta Chilo Jonaki"	Debaloy Bhattacharya	29 April 2022
5	"Ekta Jonakir Mrityu"	Debaloy Bhattacharya	29 April 2022
6	"Rawkter Sohor"	Debaloy Bhattacharya	29 April 2022
7	"Bidaay Pareshbabu"	Debaloy Bhattacharya	29 April 2022
8	"Ekta Rakkhosher Golpo"	Debaloy Bhattacharya	29 April 2022
9	"Mayur Singhashon"	Debaloy Bhattacharya	29 April 2022
10	"Koberer Golpo"	Debaloy Bhattacharya	29 April 2022

== Season 3 (2026) ==
Montu Pilot Season 3 started premiered on Hoichoi on 4 March 2026.

=== Episodes ===
No.	Title	Directed by	Original release date
1	"Wafadari"	Debaloy Bhattacharya	4 March 2026
2	"Neel Saree"	Debaloy Bhattacharya	4 March 2026
3	"Sraboni'r Pilot"	Debaloy Bhattacharya	4 March 2026
4	"Firey Jaowa"	Debaloy Bhattacharya	4 March 2026
5	"Jonaki"	Debaloy Bhattacharya	4 March 2026
6	"Bipodshima"	Debaloy Bhattacharya	4 March 2026
7	"Sesh Guli"	Debaloy Bhattacharya	4 March 2026
