= P.I. Meena =

- Genre: Mystery; Crime; Thriller
- Written by: Arindam Mitra; Ronak Kamat; Vipin Sharma
- Directed by: Debaloy Bhattacharya
- Starring: Tanya Maniktala; Harsh Chhaya; Parambrata Chattopadhyay; Zarina Wahab
- Music by: Amit Chatterjee; Rohit Kulkarni
- Country of origin: India
- Original language: Hindi
- No. of seasons: 1
- No. of episodes: 8

Production
- Executive producers: Hari Mathur; Daniel Varghese
- Producer: Anay Baldua
- Cinematography: Indra Marick
- Editor: Sourabh Prabhudesai
- Running time: 40
- Production company: QED Films

Original release
- Network: Amazon Prime Video
- Release: 3 November 2023

P.I. Meena is a Hindi-language mystery crime thriller television series created by Arindam Mitra, written by Ronak Kamat, Vipin Sharma, Arindam Mitra, Ronak Kamat, and directed by Debaloy Bhattacharya, starring Tanya Maniktala, Harsh Chhaya, Jisshu Sengupta, Parambrata Chattopadhyay, Samir Soni and Zarina Wahab in lead roles.

== Cast ==
- Tanya Maniktala as Meenakshi Iyer
- Harsh Chhaya as Pritam Sen
- Parambrata Chattopadhyay as Subho Roy
- Jisshu Sengupta as Dr. Andrew Rakhaw
- Chandrayee Ghosh as Health Secretary
- Denzil Smith as Kedar Pokhral
- Akshay Kapoor as News Anchor
- Vipin Sharma as Tridib Malhotra
- Samir Soni as Dr. Nair
- Sujan Mukherjee as O.C. Kunal K. Hazra
- Zarina Wahab as Chandana Dey
- Vinay Pathak as Dr. Basu
- Samar Kanti Biswas as Taxi Driver

== Release ==
Official trailer of the series was released on 31 October 2023.

The series was released on 3 November 2023.

== Reception ==
Subhash K. Jha for Times Now reviewed the series and opined "There is plenty of such sloppiness to be seen in P I Meena."

Critic Deepa Gahlot reviewing the series for Rediff.com rated 2.5 stars out of 5 and wrote "Too many well-known names in the cast with too little to do and some characters dispatched just when they were making sense."

A critic from Firstpost stated "Even detectives and investigators can break into a smile, at least when they know they are taking the right direction to solve the mystery."

Prateek Sur of Outlook stated "If you’re looking for a great detective story, ‘P.I. Meena’ isn't the answer."

Scroll.in stated "Rogue science combines with poor plotting to ensure that the question doesn’t get a befitting answer."

The Daily Guardian stated "Sourabh Prabhudesai’s editing is not great – this eight-episode series (40 minutes each) could have been effectively trimmed down to six cutting out a lot of unnecessary distractions in the show."
