= Revolver Rohoshyo =

- Theatrical release poster
- Directed by: Anjan Dutt
- Written by: Anjan Dutt
- Starring: Suprabhat Banerjee; Tanusree Chakraborty; Anjan Dutta
- Cinematography: Pravatendu Mondal
- Edited by: Arghyakamal Mitra
- Music by: Neel Dutt
- Production company: Color of Dreams Entertainment
- Release date: 3 February 2023
- Running time: 117 minutes
- Country: India
- Language: Bengali

Revolver Rohoshyo is a 2023 Indian Bengali language detective thriller film written and directed by Anjan Dutt. The film was produced by Color of Dreams Entertainment. The film is based on Dutt's book Danny Detective Inc.

== Plot ==
Subrata Sharma, a small time operator of a detective agency called Danny Detective INC, is hired by a big time builder, Raja Banerjee, to find his wife Tomali, who has run off with her lover called Javed Khan to Darjeeling. Subrata manages to trace her and her lover in a hotel called Revolver in Darjeeling. After being hackled by hired goons, his nose cut off, badly beaten, Subrata finds out that Tomali and Javed Khan are trying to stage a kidnap and collect ransom from the client, Raja. However, Tomali wants to get out of the deal and seeks Subrata's help to escape from Javed. In the process Tomali is killed and Subrata becomes the witness of a kidnap gone wrong. The client arrives to Darjeeling. Subrata gives evidence to the local cops and Tomali's body is cremated. Through numerous twists and turns of the plot find out that Subrata manages to find out that the entire series of events are not what they seem. That Tomali is not dead and the entire affair was rigged. Subrata manages to solve the crime and finally catch the killer. All along, Subrata is aided and helped by the elderly ghost of his boss Danny Banerjee who was shot dead long ago.

== Cast ==
- Suprabhat Banerjee as Subrata Sharma
- Tanusree Chakraborty as Tamali
- Anjan Dutt as Danny Banarjee
- Chhandak Chowdhury as Panchak
- Shoaib Kabeer as Javed / Antony Gomes
- Sujan Mukherjee
- Chandan Sen
