= Arundhati =

Arundhati may refer to:

- Arundhati (Hinduism), the wife of sage Vasishtha
- Arundhati (given name), an Indian feminine given name
- Arundhati (actress) (born 1990), an Indian film actress and model
- Arundhati (epic), a 1994 Hindi epic poem
- Arundhati (1967 film), an Indian Odia-language film directed by Prafulla Sengupta
- Arundhati (2009 film), an Indian Telugu-language film directed by Kodi Ramakrishna
- Arundhati (2014 film), an Indian Bengali-language horror thriller film
- Arundhati (2011 TV series), an Indian Marathi-language TV series produced by Balaji Telefilms
- Arundathi (Telugu TV series), an Indian Telugu-language TV series broadcast on Star Maa
- Arundhati (2016 TV series), a 2016-2017 Indian Tamil-language mystery soap opera

== See also ==
- Arundathi Nag, Indian actress
- Arundhuti Maitra, Indian politician
