= Rudranil Ghosh =

Indian actor and politician (born 1975)

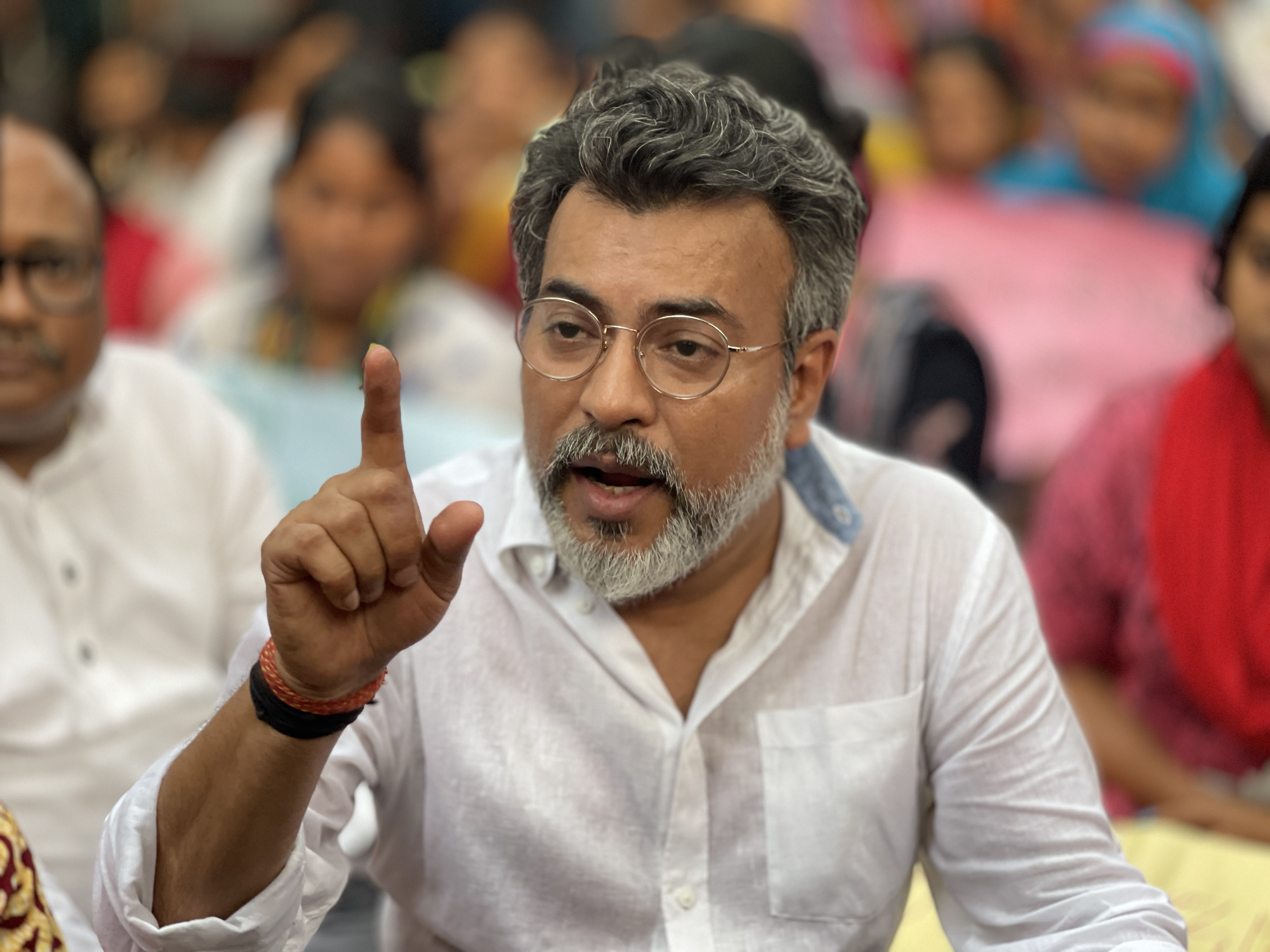
- Ghosh at the hunger strike protests against West Bengal primary teachers' recruitment scam, at Salt Lake in October 2022

Member of the West Bengal Legislative Assembly
- Incumbent
- Assumed office 4 May 2026
- Preceded by: Manoj Tiwary
- Constituency: Shibpur

President of West Bengal State Council of Technical and Vocational Education and Skill Development
- In office 2014–2020
- Preceded by: Sushmit Halder

Personal details
- Born: 6 January 1975 (age 51) Howrah, India
- Party: Bharatiya Janata Party (2021–present); Trinamool Congress (2011–2020); Communist Party of India (Marxist) (1991–2011)
- Education: Narasinha Dutt College
- Profession: Actor, Politician

Rudranil Ghosh (born 6 January 1975) is an Indian actor, writer and politician who works primarily in Bengali cinema. He began his acting career in the 2000s and has appeared in films including Kantatar, Refugee, Chalo Let's Go, Kaalbela, Vinci Da and Kedara. He has also worked in Bengali television and web series and has written screenplays and dialogues for films.

Ghosh has received recognition for his work as an actor, including the West Bengal Film Journalists' Association Awards for Best Actor in a Supporting Role for Kedara in 2020. He has also received recognition at other award ceremonies, including the Filmfare Awards Bangla, Anandalok Puraskar, and Bengal Film Journalists' Association Awards, for his work in Bengali cinema.

Alongside his work in the entertainment industry, Ghosh has been involved in politics. He has been associated with the Communist Party of India (Marxist), the All India Trinamool Congress and the Bharatiya Janata Party. He was elected to the West Bengal Legislative Assembly from Shibpur Assembly constituency in the 2026 West Bengal Legislative Assembly election.

== Early life and education ==
Rudranil Ghosh was born on 6 January 1975 in Shibpur, Howrah. He completed his early education from Santragachi Kedarnath Institution, Howrah under the West Bengal Board of Secondary Education. He graduated in 1995, from the Narasinha Dutt College, which is affiliated with the University of Calcutta.

== Political career ==
Initially he was a student leader of the Left Front. He later joined in the Trinamool Congress and became the chairman of the West Bengal State Council of Vocational Education and Training.

Thereafter in 2021, he became a member of Bharatiya Janata Party. He contested from Bhabanipur Assembly constituency in the 2021 West Bengal Legislative Assembly election against TMC leader Sovandeb Chatterjee and lost by a margin of 28,719 votes. He won the 2026 West Bengal Legislative Assembly election from Shibpur Assembly constituency by a margin of 16,058 votes.

== Career ==
=== 2010–2019: Early career ===
Ghosh began his acting career in Bengali television and theatre. He appeared in television productions and subsequently made his debut in Bengali cinema with supporting roles. His early film work included Kantatar (2005), Refugee (2006), Chalo Let's Go (2008), Kaalbela (2009) and 033 (2009), among others. He continued to work in theatre, appearing in the play Fyataru in 2006.

=== 2010–2019: Wider recognition ===
During the 2010s, Ghosh became a regular presence in Bengali films, appearing in both comedy and drama productions. His most prominent credits during this period include Katmundu (2015), Rajkahini (2015), Kelor Kirti (2016), Uma (2018) and Ek Je Chhilo Raja (2018). In 2019, he appeared in several films, including Shah Jahan Regency, Vinci Da, Bibaho Obhijaan and Satyanweshi Byomkesh. He also played the lead role in the independent production Zombiesthaan (2019).

Alongside his acting work, Ghosh also began contributing to films as a screenwriter. He wrote the story for films like Vinci Da and Bibaho Obhijaan. His work in ensemble projects and critically acclaimed films such as Hawa Bodol (2013) and Khaad (2014) included roles in both dark comedy and drama. During this decade, he received several awards for his performances, including the West Bengal Film Journalists' Association Award for Best Actor in a Supporting Role.

=== 2020–2024: Expansion into film and streaming ===
Ghosh continued working in Bengali cinema during the early 2020s, besides debuting in streaming productions and Hindi cinema. He appeared in Kedara, for which he received recognition for his supporting performance, and subsequently in films including Abhijaan and Abar Bibaho Obhijaan (2023). The latter was a sequel to Bibaho Obhijaan (2019). He wrote the screenplay and dialogues for both the films.

In the same period, he returned to theatre after a 17-year gap, joining the production Agnijol in 2023. He appeared in the web series Shabash Feluda in 2023 as Nishikanto Sarkar. His Hindi-film debut included a role in the 2024 sports drama Maidaan, in which he appeared alongside Ajay Devgn, Priyamani and Gajraj Rao.

=== 2025–present: Continued film and streaming work ===
In 2025, Ghosh appeared in Dhumketu, which had remained in production hell since 2016 before finally receiving a theatrical release in August 2025. His supporting role in the film was widely appreciated and earned him multiple awards. In the same year, he played the lead role in the independent black comedy venture The Academy of Fine Arts. In 2026, he reprised his role as Raj in Abar Hawa Bodol, a sequel to Hawa Bodol (2013).

== Legal issue ==
In January 2004, while performing the play Fyataru, Ghosh was accused of rape, cheating, and a breach of a promise to marry by actress Oindrila Chakraborty, who was his alleged live-in partner. The complaint was filed at Regent Park police station. In July 2014, the Alipore court acquitted Ghosh of the charges.

== Electoral History ==
#	House	Constituency	Year	Poll type	Winner (Party)	Runner- Up (Party)	Outcome
1	West Bengal Legislative Assembly	Bhabanipur	2021	Main Election	Sovandeb Chattopadhyay (Trinamool Congress)	Rudranil Ghosh (Bharatiya Janata Party)	Lost
2	West Bengal Legislative Assembly	Shibpur	2026	Main Election	Rudranil Ghosh (Bharatiya Janata Party)	Rana Chatterjee (Trinamool Congress)	Won

== Filmography ==
Key
†	Denotes films that have not yet been released

- All films are in Bengali language, unless otherwise noted.

Year	Film	Role	Notes	Ref.
2005	Kantatar	—N/a	Marked his feature film debut	
2006	Refugee	Ashok		
2007	Bonobhumi	—N/a		
2007	Kaal	Ratan		
2007	Our Time	Ratan da		
2008	Hello Kolkata	Animesh		
2008	Chalo Let's Go	Hari		
2008	Sabdhan Pancha Aashche	—N/a	Incomplete film, permanently shelved	
2008	Chha-e Chhuti	Rudra		
2008	Teen Yaari Katha	Shyamal		
2008	Chirodini Tumi Je Amar	Ali		
2009	Angshumaner Chhobi	Rajiv		
2009	Durga	—N/a		
2009	Chora Bali	—N/a		
2009	Kaler Rakhal	A young Bohurupi performer		
2009	Kaalbela	Tridib		
2009	033	Rudra, a keyboardist		
2010	Love Circus	Salim		
2010	Jor Jar Mulluk Tar	Rudra		
2010	Thana Theke Aschi	Rajat		
2010	Lukochurii	—N/a		
2010	Mela	Ratan		
2010	Byomkesh Bakshi	Prabhat		
2010	The Japanese Wife	Fatik		
2011	Bye Bye Bangkok	Sadhucharan Das		
2011	Jiyo Kaka	Asiful		
2011	Necklace	Keshtopada		
2011	Chaplin	Bangshi Das		
2012	Bedroom	Deb		
2012	Elar Char Adhyay	Botu		
2012	Balukabela.com	Rabin		
2012	Ekla Akash	A film producer		
2012	Accident	Karthik Mondol		
2013	Basanta Utsav	A bachelor neighbour		
2013	Hawa Bodol	Raj		
2013	Proloy	Prasanta		
2013	Ashare Goppo	Gobordhan Maity		
2014	Khaad	Paltan		
2015	Roga Howar Sohoj Upaye	Nandan		
2015	Rajkahini	Sujon		
2015	Katmundu	Siddarth		
2015	Black	Roni		
2016	Kelor Kirti	Urvashi's friend		
2016	Love Express	Drunk driver		
2017	K: Secret Eye	Private Investigator K		
2018	Honeymoon	Chitoo		
2018	Ek Je Chhilo Raja	Doctor Ashwini Dasgupta		
2018	Amar Sahor	Srijit, a news editor		
2018	Uma	Gobindo		
2019	Shah Jahan Regency	Barun Raha		
2019	Thai Curry	Nitin		
2019	Vinci Da	Vinci Da	Co-wrote the story with Srijit Mukherjee	
2019	Zombiesthaan	Anil		
2019	Bibaho Obhijaan	Rajat	Also contributed as a writer, receiving credits for the story, screenplay and dialogues	
2019	Satyanweshi Byomkesh	Ajit Bandyopadhyay		
2020	Dracula Sir	Katu Mallick		
2021	Pratidwandi	Sukumar Sen		
2022	Swastik Sanket	Subhas Chatterjee		
2022	Abar Bochhor Koori Pore	Dutta		
2023	Abar Bibaho Obhijaan	Rajat	Also contributed as a writer, receiving credits for the story, screenplay and dialogues	
2024	Maidaan	Subhankar Sengupta	Marked his Hindi-language feature film debut	
2025	Dhumketu	Jogesh Chandra Sharma		
2025	The Academy of Fine Arts	Dinabandhu "Dinu" Mitra		
2026	Abar Hawa Bodol	Raj	Released after being stuck in production hell for ten years	
2027	Maharaja Tomare Selam	TBA		

== Television ==
Year	Television series	Role	Network	Language	Notes	Ref.
2000-2005	Ek Akasher Niche	Probal	Alpha Bangla	Bengali	Marked his television debut; Soap opera	
2005	Din Pratidin	—N/a	Zee Bangla	Bengali	Soap opera	
2005	Nader Chand	A college student	Tara Bangla	Bengali	Telefilm	
2014	Byomkesh	Bangshidar	ETV Bangla	Bengali	Television series	

== Web series ==
Year	Title	Role	Network	Language	Notes	Ref.
2019-2020	Rahasya Romancha Series	Jhontu	Hoichoi	Bengali	Cameo appearance; Marked his web series debut	
2023	Shabash Feluda	Nishikanto Sarkar	ZEE5	Bengali	Based on Satyajit Ray's novel Gangtokey Gondogol	
2023	Gentlemen	Megh	Addatimes	Bengali		
2025	Ganoshotru	Hubba Shyamal	ZEE5	Bengali	Anthology series	

== Accolades ==
Year	Award	Ceremony	Category	Film	Result	Ref.
2007	BFJA Award	—N/a	Best Supporting Actor	Kantatar	Won	
2007	BFJA Award	—N/a	Best Supporting Actor	Refugee	Won	
2020	WBFJA Awards	4th WBFJA Awards	Best Actor in a Supporting Role	Kedara	Won	
2020	WBFJA Awards	4th WBFJA Awards	Best Actor	Vinci Da	Nominated	
2021	Filmfare Awards Bangla	4th Filmfare Awards Bangla	Best Story	Vinci Da	Won (Co-won with Srijit Mukherjee)	
2021	Filmfare Awards Bangla	4th Filmfare Awards Bangla	Best Actor	Vinci Da	Nominated	
2021	Filmfare Awards Bangla	4th Filmfare Awards Bangla	Best Supporting Actor	Kedara	Nominated	
2022	WBFJA Awards	5th WBFJA Awards	Best Actor in a Negative Role	Dracula Sir	Nominated	
2023	WBFJA Awards	6th WBFJA Awards	Best Actor in a Supporting Role	Abhijaan	Nominated	
2023	WBFJA Awards	6th WBFJA Awards	Best Actor in a Comic Role	Abar Bochhor Koori Pore	Nominated	
2026	WBFJA Awards	9th WBFJA Awards	Best Actor in a Supporting Role	Dhumketu	Won	
