= Uma (2018 film) =

2018 Indian Bengali film

- Theatrical Release Poster
- Directed by: Srijit Mukherji
- Written by: Srijit Mukherjee
- Screenplay by: Srijit Mukherjee
- Produced by: Shrikant Mohta; Mahendra Soni
- Starring: Jisshu Sengupta; Sara Sengupta; Anjan Dutt; Srabanti Chatterjee; Sayantika Banerjee; Rudranil Ghosh; Babul Supriyo; Anirban Bhattacharya
- Edited by: Pronoy Dasgupta
- Music by: Anupam Roy
- Production company: SVF Entertainment
- Distributed by: SVF Entertainment
- Release date: 1 June 2018 (India)
- Country: India
- Language: Bengali

Uma is a 2018 Indian Bengali-language drama film written and directed by Srijit Mukherji. Produced by Shrikant Mohta and Mahendra Soni under the banner of Shree Venkatesh Films, the film stars Sara Sengupta in the titular role in her debut, alongside an ensemble cast of Jisshu Sengupta, Srabanti Chatterjee, Anjan Dutt, Rudranil Ghosh and Anirban Bhattacharya in lead roles. It follows an estranged NRI father's struggle to recreate Durga Puja months ahead of autumn, in order to fulfill the wish of his terminally ill daughter of witnessing the festival, who had only a few months to live.

The film based on the real-life story of Evan Leversage, also known as "The Boy who moved Christmas". The movie was released on 1 June 2018.

== Plot ==
In the film, a young girl, Uma living in Zurich, Switzerland, is fighting for her life due to a terminal disease. While she went on to visit a doctor, he reveals that she has hardly two months to live. Himadri is shattered after hearing this and She wants to see Durga Puja of Kolkata, the biggest celebrated festival in Bengali culture. Himadri had earlier promised Uma that he will take her to Kolkata but failed because of his busy work schedule. Himadri takes her to Kolkata to fulfil her dream by planning to set up a fake Durga Puja with the help of some movie makers Gobindo find a director called Brahmananda Chakraborty. The failed director sees this as his opportunity to create a masterpiece, by helping a dying girl. The director at first did not agree to the proposal of the father. Later after remembering his past and how he could not make his son's life a beautiful one, in the past it shows he was not a successful director as many of his movies failed to make a mark following which his wife and son separated from him, the director goes to the residency of Himadri and gives a proposal to creating the Durga Puja after a brief talk. Jisshu Sengupta agrees with the proposal and the director goes on to create a false set of Durga Puja. During this, they face many problems to make Uma's dream true. Mohitosh Sur resident of that society call it a mockery of the festival but the society members rebuff him, meanwhile the crew is facing problem that with whom Uma will live, Brahmananda tells that Uma will live with her mother, it is seen in flashback because of Himadri busy schedule Menoka was having extra-marital affair with a man named Indra a Govt Officer, after Himadri found out he divorced Menoka forcing her to leave everything including Uma who was then two years old, because as per Himadri, she cannot take the child back because of having affair after marriage as per the law, after learning about it, they finally audition for girls who will play for Uma's mother, after much failed attempts they finally find a suitable women named Marium. Meanwhile, Mohitosh tries all attempts to stop the fake festival by reaching the police but fails, he even threatens file a case in court but Gobindo bribes the lawyer brought by Mohitosh turning the tables, meanwhile Himadri bring Uma from Zürich after landing in Kolkata, he find that electricity department has denied permission and the officer personally wants to meet Himadri, the officer is none other Indra, after a small argument Himadri leaves not long punching him in the nose, just he did when Menoka left with him, as he leaves with Uma for the pandal the decoration lights are switched on, Himadri receives a message from Indra learning about his side of story, it turned out Indra did not knew that Menoka was already married, and he had no intention to destroy anyone married life, as they reach Uma receives a grand welcome from everyone. Uma finally meets her mother (who is in reality an actress) after a long time. Meanwhile, Mohitosh after failed legal attempts, threatens Himadri with illegal way by calling a local Bihari goon, who points gun on Himadri to shoot him, but suddenly Uma come near that Bihari goon begging to leaving him, seeing Uma, the Bihari goon remembers his past, it turned out his father was killed in same way in front of his eyes when he was a kid, feeling mercy he lets go Himadri, instead he threantens Mohitosh to stay away from them. Days pass and puja celebration goes swiftly, on one night Indra comes to visit Himadri, where he tells someone is waiting for him in the car, the person is none other than Menoka who looks like is now married to Indra, on asking about Uma, he points her towards Maruim, and says even being her fake mom she is doing what a real mother need to do, eventually he leaves her, as Himadri leaves for Uma and Marium, Menoka cant do nothing but cry realizing her mistakes done in the past, Meanwhile, Mohitosh also learns about the reason behind the fake durga puja, and he decides he will do whatever he takes to fulfill Uma last wish.

As the day of Dashami (last day of Durga Puja) arrives the crew find out that there are no junior artists, everyone including Mohitosh try their best, he even pay visit to that Bihari goon house requesting help, as the crew slowly losses hope, but not shortly the Bihari goon arrives with the required crowd needed for Durga Visarjan. Uma also arrives and celebrate, but for surprise for Brahmananda his wife and son come there to celebrate with him, as they all dance and celebrate Uma suddenly faints, in later scene we see everyone including Mahitosh, the Bihari goon and Brahmananada family bid farewell to Uma as everyone is feeling emotional as it might be the last time they will be seeing Uma. As they proceed towards airport, Himadri shows an old photograph of his and Uma actual mother, it turned out Uma in real already knew that Maaium is not her actual mother, she eventually apologizes. Himadri does nothing but cry. Few days later Marium is now living with Uma and Himadri, as doctor has approved for carrying out operation on Uma, she mails to Himadri family members about each and every experience she witnessed till now and also pray for Uma speedy recovery.

The plot is based on true events surrounding the life and death of Evan Leversage, who lived in St George in Ontario, Canada.

== Cast ==
- Sara Sengupta as Uma
- Jisshu Sengupta as Himadri Sen
- Anjan Dutt as Brahmananda
- Srabanti Chatterjee as Mariyam (Acting as Menoka, the mother of Uma)
- Sayantika Banerjee as Menoka (Real mother of Uma)
- Rudranil Ghosh as Gobindo
- Anirban Bhattacharya as Mohitosh Sur
- Babul Supriyo as Mahesh
- Gargi Roychowdhury as Medha
- Sujan Mukhopadhyay as Barun
- Nibedita Mukherjee as Meera
- Abhijit Guha
- Ambarish Bhattacharya
- Sayantani Guhathakurta
- Beas Dhar
- Srijit Mukherjee as Indra

=== Special appearance ===
- Prosenjit Chatterjee
- Dev
- Nusrat Jahan
- Mimi Chakraborty
- Mir Afsar Ali
- Arindam Sil
- Kamaleshwar Mukherjee
- Raj Chakraborty
- Manoj Mitra

== Soundtrack ==
Uma

Soundtrack album by Anupam Roy
- Released: 21 May 2018
- Recorded: 2018
- Genre: Feature film soundtrack
- Length: 27:18
- Language: Bengali
- Label: SVF

Anupam Roy chronology
Drishtikone (2018)	Uma (2018)	Shah Jahan Regency (2019)

The music and lyrics of the film are composed by Anupam Roy.

No.	Title	Singer(s)	Length
1.	"Hariye Jawar Gaan"	Anupam Roy	03:49
2.	"Aaloshyo"	Surangana Bandyopadhyay	05:17
3.	"Jaago Uma"	Rupankar Bagchi	05:17
4.	"Ure Jaak"	Anupam Roy	04:28
5.	"Esho Bondhu (Male)"	Sidhu (Siddhartha Ray) & Pota (Abhijit Barman)	04:10
6.	"Esho Bondhu (Female)"	Ujjaini Mukherjee Somlata Acharyya Chowdhury	04:12
Total length:			27:18
