= Zombiesthaan =

2019 Bengali zombie film

- Release poster
- Directed by: Abhirup Ghosh
- Written by: Abhirup Ghosh
- Produced by: Rajesh Kumar Pandey; Krishnaaa Motion Pictures
- Starring: Rudranil Ghosh; Rajatava Dutta; Tanusree Chakraborty
- Cinematography: Ankkit Sengupta
- Edited by: Mithun Adhikary
- Music by: Megh Banerjee
- Production company: Krishna Motion Pictures
- Release date: 13 December 2019
- Running time: 94 minutes
- Country: India
- Language: Bengali

Zombiesthaan (Land of Zombie) is a Bengali-language independent dystopian action-horror film directed by Abhirup Ghosh and produced by Rajesh Kumar Pandey. This is the first Bengali language zombie film and a dystopian adventure movie that is set in a post-apocalyptic Bengal. The film was released in theaters on 13 December 2019 under the banner of Krishna Motion Pictures.

== Plot ==
The movie revolves around the post apocalyptic adventure of one lady and her struggle for survival. In the year 2030, a deadly biochemical weapon has spread across the world, and turns the major people into ferocious zombies. A survivor, Akira is traveling through the wastelands of Bengal and trying to find out her way into a military safe zone. All communication systems are out of order. In her journey, she faces insane zombies. Akira takes shelter in the house of one mysterious Anil Chatterjee at Rupnarayanpur. Anil believes that the human era is over and there is no safe zone at all. He asks Akira to stay there. The very next day Akira finds that Anil became cannibalistic, she flees from Rupnarayanpur. She receives a transmitter message that an army safe zone is active 400 km away. But a megalomaniac and pervert King Raja Haridas captures Akira. He makes slave number of women. Now she has to fight against the King with the help of other slaves.

== Cast ==
- Rudranil Ghosh as Anil
- Tanusree Chakraborty as Akira
- Rajatava Dutta as Raja Haridas
- Souman Bose as Military officer
- Jeena Tarafder as Karuna
- Debolina Biswas
- Sourav Saha
- Satyahari Mondal
