= Window Connection =

- Directed by: R. K. Gupta
- Music by: Anupam Roy
- Release date: 9 May 2014
- Country: India
- Language: Bengali

Window Connection is a 2014 Bengali psychological thriller film directed by R. K. Gupta. It features actors Aryann Bhowmik and Tanusree Chakraborty in the lead roles. Music of this film has been composed by Anupam Roy.

== Plot ==
Rahul is a college-going boy who has always longed for the attention and love of his parents, which he feels deprived of. When he meets Sohini, his forgets his loneliness and his mind gets obsessed with thoughts of her. A new desire to live works within him. But that Rahul loves her remains unknown to Sohini, the results of which were strange or mysterious events occurring in her life. Whether Rahul is able to win the heart of Sohini or not, forms the climax of the story.

== Cast ==
- Aryann Bhowmik as Rahul
- Tanusree Chakraborty as Sohini
- Biswajit Chakraborty
- Kanchan Mullick
- Rajat Ganguly
- Rita Koiral
- Sunil Kumar

== Production ==
Window Connection is the directorial debut of R. K. Gupta. Regarding his first project, he said, "We have already started shooting. It's a triangular love story-turned-psychological thriller. And I must say, both the actors are doing a fine job." Tanusree Chakraborty referred to this film as a "dark film".

Tanusree Chakraborty was signed to play the role of Sohini, who is a cheerful girl who works for an ad agency. On the other hand, Rahul, the character played by Aryann Bhowmik, is a dark character. Rahul is a college-going student from a disturbed family background. This is for the first time that Tanusree is working as a heroine where her hero is younger than her. Regarding her role in the film, Tanusree said, "My character, Sohini, has loads of shades and the film has lots of twists and turns. Initially, it might come across as a love story, but it gradually develops into a thriller."

== Music ==
Anupam Roy roped in to compose the film score for Window Connection.
