= Bidaay Byomkesh =

2018 Indian Bengali action, adventure and mystery film by Debaloy Bhattacharya

- Official poster
- Bidaay Byomkesh
- Directed by: Debaloy Bhattacharya
- Written by: Debaloy Bhattacharya
- Based on: Byomkesh Bakshi by Sharadindu Bandyopadhyay
- Produced by: Mahendra Soni, Shrikant Mohta
- Starring: Abir Chatterjee; Sohini Sarkar
- Cinematography: Ramyadip Saha
- Edited by: Sanglap Bhowmick
- Music by: Saqi Banerjee
- Production company: Shree Venkatesh Films
- Release date: 20 July 2018
- Running time: 121 minutes
- Country: India
- Language: Bengali

Bidaay Byomkesh is a 2018 Indian Bengali detective thriller film written and directed by Debaloy Bhattacharya and produced by Shrikant Mohta and Mahendra Soni under the banner of Shree Venkatesh Films. The film was released on 20 July 2018. It is the sixth installment of Byomkesh film series produced by SVF.

== Cast ==
- Abir Chottopadhyay as Byomkesh Bakshi / Satyaki Bakshi (Double role)
- Sohini Sarkar as Satyabati/ Avantika (Tunna) (Double role)
- Rahul Banerjee as Ajit Bandopadhyaya
- Joy Sengupta as Abhimanyu Bakshi, Son of Byomkesh Bakshi
- Bidipta Chakrabarty as Anasuya Bakshi, Wife of Abhimanyu Bakhshi
- Rupankar Bagchi as DC Krishnendu Malo
- Sujoy Prosad Chatterjee as Subimal Kumar Mondal
- Arindam Sil as Tunna's Father

== Soundtrack ==
Bidaay Bomkesh

Soundtrack album by Saqi Banerjee
- Released: 14 July 2018
- Recorded: 2018
- Studios: Sonic solutions, Studio Saptak, Studio channel I
- Genre: Feature film soundtrack
- Length: 8:35
- Label: SVF
- Producers: Mahendra Soni, Shrikant Mohta

All lyrics are written by Saqi Banerjee; all music is composed by Saqi Banerjee.

Track listing
No.	Title	Music	Singer	Length
1.	"Shondhye Namar Aagey"	Saqi Banerjee	Ishan Mitra	04:13
2.	"Bidaay"	Saqi Banerjee	Saqi Banerjee	04:22
Total length:				08:35

== Release ==
The film was theatrically released on 20 July 2018.

== Reception ==
Bhaskar Chattopadhyay of Firstpost called the premise "interesting" but criticised the writing by calling it lazy and confused." He further wrote, "bir Chatterjee is the only silver lining in this catastrophic film. I suggest you spend your time revisiting the books instead of watching Biday Byomkesh." Shantanu Ray Chaudhuri of Film Companion wrote, "The problem primarily lies in the writing, which is at times downright sloppy – unpardonable for a murder mystery. There are convenient creative licences taken to overcome plot hurdles."
