= Tanusree Chakraborty =

Indian actress and politician

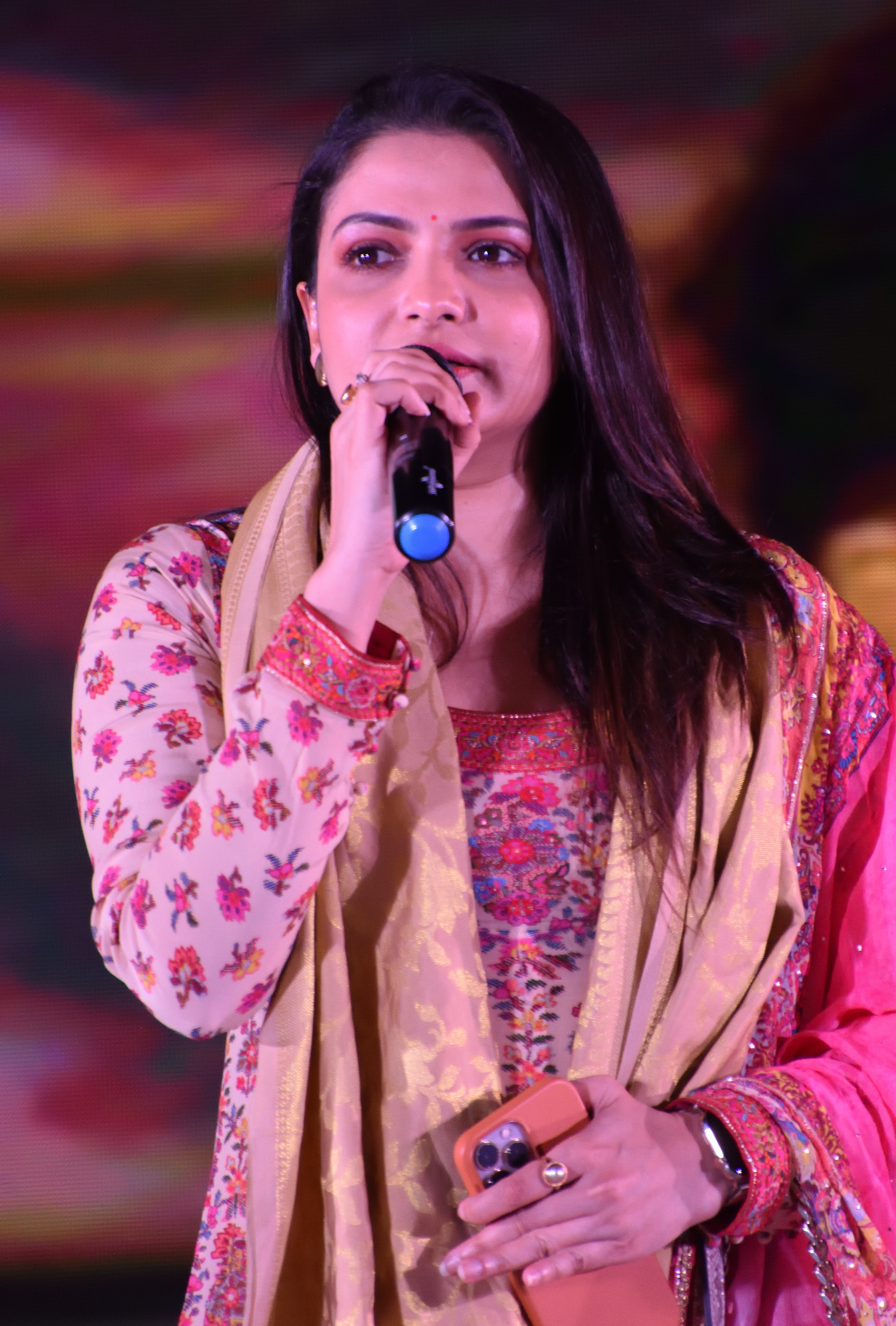
- Tanusree Chakraborty
- Born: August 6, 1984 (age 42); Calcutta, West Bengal, India
- Other name: Tnusree Chakraborty
- Education: Basanti Devi College
- Occupations: Actress; Politician
- Years active: 2010–present
- Political party: Bharatiya Janata Party (2021)
- Spouse: Sujit Basu (m. 2025)

Tanusree Chakraborty (also Tnusree) is an Indian actress and politician who works primarily in Bengali films. Along with films, she has also worked on various television shows. Recently she has been hosting a beauty and lifestyle show called Sampurna on Zee Bangla channel.

== Early life ==
Chakraborty was born on 6 August 1984 in Kolkata into a Bengali family and was a student at Kamala Girls' High School in Kolkata. She later studied political science at Basanti Devi College, a University of Calcutta affiliate. She owns two restaurants in Kolkata.

== Career ==
After finishing school, Chakraborty began to work as a model. At that time, she did not have a full idea of what modeling consisted of. She worked as a model for a short time and appeared in numerous advertisements, among which was a Bangladeshi commercial for Pran Powder Spice that was very popular in both Bengals. She came to prominence with the 2011 film Uro Chithi. She came into the limelight with performances in Bengali films such as Bedroom (2012), Obhishopto Nighty (2014), Window Connections (2014), Buno Haansh (2014) etc.

== Political career ==
Chakraborty joined the BJP in 2021, and contested for the party in the Shyampur seat in the 2021 West Bengal Legislative Assembly election but lost. She later quit the party in July 2021 in order to concentrate on her film career.

== Filmography ==
- Bondhu Eso Tumi (2010)
- Uro Chithi (2011)
- Bedroom (2012)
- Bhalobasa Off Route (2012)
- Kayekti Meyer Golpo (2012)
- Chhoan (2012)
- Swabhoomi (2013)
- Basanta Utsab (2013)
- Shunyo (2013)
- Obhishopto Nighty (2014)
- Window Connections (2014)
- Buno Haansh (2014)
- Khaad (2014)
- Ichchhemotir Gappo (2015)
- Cross Connection 2 (2015)
- Chorabali (2016)
- Colkatay Columbus (2016)
- Durga Sohay (2017)
- Samantaral (2017)
- Chawlochitro Circus (2017)
- Michael (2018)
- Flat No 609 (2018)
- Gumnaami (2019)
- Harano Prapti (2019)
- Zombiesthaan (2019)
- Nirbandhamer Jora Khun (2020)
- Antardhaan (2021)
- Tonic (2021)
- Raavan (2022)
- Abar Kanchanjungha (2022)
- Revolver Rohoshyo (2023)
- Chirosakha Hey (2023)
- Deep Fridge (2025)

== Reality Shows ==
- Didi No. 1 (2010) Zee Bangla
- Ebar Jalsha Rannaghore (2015) Star Jalsha

== See also ==
- Ushasie Chakraborty
