= Indubala Bhaater Hotel =

2023 Indian Bengali web series

- Release poster
- Genre: Drama
- Created by: Kallol Lahiri
- Based on: Indubala Bhaater Hotel by Kallol Lahiri
- Written by: Debaloy Bhattacharya; Tisha Nandy
- Screenplay by: Debaloy Bhattacharya; Tisha Nandy
- Directed by: Debaloy Bhattacharya
- Starring: Subhashree Ganguly; Sneha Chatterjee
- Composer: Amit Chatterjee
- Country of origin: India
- Original language: Bengali
- No. of seasons: 1
- No. of episodes: 8

Production
- Production company: Shree Venkatesh Films

Original release
- Release: 8 March 2023 – present

Indubala Bhaater Hotel is a 2023 drama Bengali web series available on the streaming platform Hoichoi. Directed by Debaloy Bhattacharya, the series is based on an eponymous Bengali novel by Kallol Lahiri, which revolves around the life and struggles of Indubala, the protagonist. Her somber life, punctuated with fleeting hopes of happiness, exemplifies a human's yearning to return to one's roots, only to be shackled by the heaviness of responsibilities and the vagaries of geopolitics.

With music by Amit Chatterjee, the series marks the web series debut of Subhashree Ganguly in the lead role. While the editing was done by Sanglap Bhowmik, the cinematography was handled by Ramyadip Saha. Parijat Chaudhuri, Sneha Chatterjee, Debapratim Dasgupta and Angana Roy play other pivotal roles. The series was released to generally positive reviews from the critics as well as the audience, who particularly praised Subhashree's acting, the seasoned direction which well adapted the novel and the nostalgia evoking music.

== Plot ==
The series explores the trials and tribulations of Indubala, born in a village of East Pakistan who marries an urban man from Kolkata (in West Bengal) and leaves her ancestral village. She has to adjust to the new way of life in the city. She becomes a widow at an early age and brings up her two sons singlehandedly.

With guidance from a few well-wishers, Indubala–an experienced cook–starts a home-based small restaurant mainly catering to local workers and commuters. Gradually her restaurant becomes popular thanks to word of mouth, and much later due to shares in social media from its aficionados. With the earnings from the restaurant, her life slowly stabilizes. Her children grow up and settle into their lives.

Throughout all these years, Indubala reminisces about her childhood in the village of East Bengal and yearns to return there one day, but can not because of her familial responsibilities and also because the village belongs to another country Bangladesh (stemming from the 1947 partition of India and 1971 independence of Bangladesh).

== Cast ==
- Subhashree Ganguly as Indubala Mallick
  - Parijat Chaudhuri as young Indubala
- Sneha Chatterjee as Lachhmi
- Debapratim Dasgupta as Dhananjay alias Dhana
- Angana Roy as Sanchari, an amateur vlogger turned Indubala's adopted granddaughter
- Rahul Banerjee as Pradip, Indubala's younger son
- Pratik Dutta as Ratanlal Mallick, Indubala's husband
- Suhotro Mukhopadhyay as Alok, a Naxalite

== Episodes ==
No.	Title	Directed by	Written by	Original release date
1	"Pakhider Smriti"	Debaloy Bhattacharya	Debaloy Bhattacharya, Tisha Nandy	March 8, 2025
2	"Ami Eka Chini."	Debaloy Bhattacharya	Debaloy Bhattacharya, Tisha Nandy	March 8, 2025
3	"Shunyo E Bukey"	Debaloy Bhattacharya	Debaloy Bhattacharya, Tisha Nandy	March 8, 2025
4	"Dehotori Dilam Chaari"	Debaloy Bhattacharya	Debaloy Bhattacharya, Tisha Nandy	March 8, 2025
5	"Dhiki Dhiki Tarar Dafan"	Debaloy Bhattacharya	Debaloy Bhattacharya, Tisha Nandy	March 24, 2025
6	"Kothay Tomay Pai"	Debaloy Bhattacharya	Debaloy Bhattacharya, Tisha Nandy	March 24, 2025
7	"Majhi Baiya Jao Re"	Debaloy Bhattacharya	Debaloy Bhattacharya, Tisha Nandy	March 24, 2025
8	"Pawrajito Ek Bahini"	Debaloy Bhattacharya	Debaloy Bhattacharya, Tisha Nandy	March 24, 2025

== Production ==
=== Announcement and development ===
The series was announced by director Debaloy Bhattacharya on 24 June 2022. Debaloy Bhattacharya and the author of the eponymous novel, Kallol were friends. Kallol used to send him chapters from his book to read and Bhattacharya became inspired from there. He got drawn to it and started to create a suitable screen adaptation, which was completed at the end of three years.

When The announcement took place, some people asked if it was the right decision from my end. I see it as a natural progression. These days, we all watch fascinating works on OTT almost every day. As a creative individual, I was eager to work in OTT. I was getting offers. I told myself that I would do an OTT project as soon as I get a good character. Having said that, I did not say yes to this project to influence others. The main reason I said yes to Indubala was because of the character. I would say yes to this character even if it was a film or something else.

— Subhashree Ganguly, during an interview with OTTplay

In an interview with India Today, Subhashree Ganguly spoke about how she trained herself to fit into the shoes of the character and maintain a wise appearance, since she is someone who has seen and passed through all the hurdles of life. She read the script for around 100 times and used to read it at any time of the day before the filming had begun.

=== Pre production ===
Subhashree Ganguly took mock drills from Sohini Sengupta for 15-20 days to expertise in the role of 75 year old Indubala. Director Debaloy Bhattacharya approached Amit Chatterjee in 2022 to compose the music of the series. Chatterjee accepted the offer and made the songs of the series through a span of eleven to twelve months. To suit the series, he incorporated folk sounds with nostalgic music rhythms and various ragas. Debaloy Bhattacharya has penned the lyrics of the seven original compositions in the series along with other lyricists in a few songs. Chatterjee revealed that for many songs including "Dhiki Dhiki", he made composition around the lyrics written by Bhattacharya instead of the usual vice versa process.

=== Filming ===
The principal filming took place in late 2022 and was done at an old dalan bari in Kolkata. Filming took place throughout August 2022 till 9 September 2022. After a short break of 11 days, the next schedule started from 20 September and lasted till mid-October.

Parijat Chaudhuri played role of young Indubala. Shooting started three weeks after her look test. To adapt to her role, she adopted a Bangal accent, quickly learned cooking various puli pithas from her grandmother, and learned doing various household chores akin a rural Bengali girl. In an interview, she mentioned how she had first time experiences of climbing large trees and catching chingri maach with her aanchal in a village pond.

The filming of the scenes in which the elderly look of Subhashree Ganguly was portrayed was filmed for 20 days. In an interview, Subhashree Ganguly revealed that doing the make-up and taking it off while shooting for the senile Indubala scenes often took longer time than the filming scenes itself. It used to take three to three and a half hours to put on the prosthetic make-up and more than one hour to take it off. While removing make-up, the deposited sweat used to gush out like water. The heavy make up also caused a lot of breathing issues since it was summertime.

=== Post production ===
The music composer Amit Chatterjee mentioned in an interview that during the post production phase, when the songs were first sent to the producers, they were instantly rejected. They opined that kind of songs would not work for the series. But Chatterjee and the director Debaloy Bhattacharya were adamant on their decision. After the album came out, the songs were praised for the nostalgic touch and rural essence.

== Marketing ==
On 20 September 2022, the announcement poster of the series was released. On 21 September 2022, the makers unveiled the poster of Subhashree Ganguly as the elderly Indubala. The teaser of the series was dropped on 29 January 2023. The trailer was unveiled on 20 February 2023.

== Soundtrack ==
Indubala Bhaater Hotel

Soundtrack album by Amit Chatterjee
- Released: 30 April 2023
- Recorded: 2021–2022
- Genre: Feature film soundtrack
- Length: 54:36
- Language: Bengali
- Label: SVF Music

Official audio
- Indubala Bhaater Hotel - Full Album on YouTube

The music of the web series has been composed by Amit Chatterjee. Out of the ten songs in the album of the series, seven are Chatterjee's original compositions. The remaining three are popular regional folk songs whose original creators are unknown.

No.	Title	Lyrics	Singer(s)	Length
1.	"Pakhider Smriti (orchestral Version)"	Debaloy Bhattacharya, Atul Prosad	Iman Chakraborty	4:36
2.	"Pakhider Smriti"	Debaloy Bhattacharya, Atul Prosad	Ikkshita Mukherjee	4:03
3.	"Dhiki Dhiki"	Debaloy Bhattacharya, Ritam Sen	Ikkshita Mukherjee	3:38
4.	"Dehotori"	Debaloy Bhattacharya	Chakropani Dev	5:47
5.	"Ami Eka Chini"	Debaloy Bhattacharya	Jayati Chakraborty	6:16
6.	"Shunyo E Buke"			4:29
7.	"Kakhana Haribe Dukho Mor + Majhi Baiya Jao Re"			5:01
8.	"Kothay Tomay Pai"			5:23
9.	"Tore Chinono Na Jay"			5:59
10.	"Dana Kata Pori"	Debaloy Bhattacharya	Anirban Bhattacharya	9:58
Total length:				54:36

== Reception ==
The series was appraised and well received by the audience, who applauded Subhashree Ganguly's acting skills while portraying the senile Indubala, the use of food as a tool to evoke memories and nostalgia and the nostalgic sounding music which added an aesthetic touch to the well done, close shots amplified cinematography.

=== Critical reception ===
Poorna Banerjee of The Times of India rated the series 3.5/5 stars and termed it as "A heartwarming tale of love, sacrifice, and nurture, and a good watch." She added "Subhashree Ganguly fits herself into this role with a great deal of grace and aplomb. The music invokes an aura of nostalgic melancholia. What perhaps jars sometimes is the continual repetition of certain dialogues and the extended eating scenes." Shamayita Chakraborty of OTTplay rated the series 3/5 stars and wrote "Indubala Bhaater Hotel is a deeply emotional drama that essentially deserves to be seen at a stretch to leave a mark. Subhashree is the backbone of the narration and she is outstanding when she plays her age. The pace falters here and there due to overt melancholy and sentiments and this discontinuity is irksome."

Agnivo Niyogi of The Telegraph reviewed the series and highlighted "With food as the connecting thread, Indubala Bhaater Hotel weaves a tale of nostalgia and a sense of loss that runs deep within the protagonist even decades after being separated from her homeland." He particularly praised Subhashree's acting, the nostalgic music, crisp editing and cinematography. Archi Sengupta of Leisurebyte reviewed the series and opined "Indubala Bhaater Hotel is a heartbreaking and heartwarming story about a woman’s struggles and her empathy towards those around her – and it hits all the right notes. Not just the story – Subhashree Ganguly encompasses her role beautifully."

Suparna Majumder of Sangbad Pratidin reviewed the series and wrote "Debaloy Bhattachrya's Indubala Bhaater Hotel will touch the heart of all those Bengalis who still have pakhider reeti neeti deep inside their heart." She praised Subhashree Ganguly's portrayal of Indubala, particularly in her octogenarian phase as well as the make-up artist Somnath Kundu. Ranita Goswami of the Hindustan Times reviewed the series and highlighted "Director Debaloy Bhattacharya successfully captivates the audience with the nostalgia marred in this series, which is aptly supported by Subhashree's seasoned acting and dialogue delivery." She also praised the cinematography, dialogues and the nostalgia evoking music.

== Accolades ==
Year	Award	Category	Recipient	Result	Ref.
2024	NEXA Streaming Academy Awards	Best Actor (Critics)- Series (Female) (Regional)	Subhashree Ganguly	Won	
2024	Kolkata Debi Awards	Picture of Versatility - Actor	Subhashree Ganguly	Won	
2024	TV9 Bangla Ghorer Bioscope Awards	Best Actress - Web Series	Subhashree Ganguly	Won	
2024	TV9 Bangla Ghorer Bioscope Awards	Best Director - OTT	Debaloy Bhattacharya	Won	
2024	TV9 Bangla Ghorer Bioscope Awards	Best Web Series	Indubala Bhaater Hotel	Won	
2024	TV9 Bangla Ghorer Bioscope Awards	Best Cinematographer - OTT	Ramyadeep Saha	Won	
2024	TV9 Bangla Ghorer Bioscope Awards	Best Editor - OTT	Sanglap Bhowmick	Won	

== Sequel ==
Subhashree Ganguly mentioned in an interview that despite the success of the series, there would not be any second part to Indubala Bhaater Hotel. She mentioned "It's a limited edition and bringing a second part just owing to the success of the first part would be an insult to the legacy of the character of Indubala.

== Controversy ==
Veteran singer Jayati Chakraborty expressed her disappointment after her song was deleted from the series. She mentioned that she does not want to lose faith as music is a matter of faith to her. She said, if one loses one's faith, the song's word don't touch the heart, irrespective of whether it's a Tagore song or any other. This sparked an online criticism against the makers. Later, the director Debaloy Bhattacharya clarified that the song sung by her has not been removed; it would be released in the next part. Subsequently, her song was released alon with full album of the series.
