= West Bengal Film Journalists' Association Awards =

Indian film critics association awards

- Current: 9th WBFJA Awards
- Awarded for: Excellence in Indian Bengali cinema
- Country: India
- Presented by: West Bengal Film Journalists' Association
- First award: 2013; 13 years ago
- Final award: 2026
- Website: WBFJA

West Bengal Film Journalists' Association Awards, commonly referred to as WBFJA Awards, is given by the West Bengal Film Journalists' Association. The association was founded in 2013 in Kolkata. The award ceremony is called Cinemar Somaborton (transl. Cinema Convocation).

== Overview ==
WBFJA can be called the successors of BFJA, the oldest association of film critics in India, which was founded in 1939. BFJA used to felicitate Indian Cinema every year. In 2013, the last BFJA Awards were held in Kolkata, the same year as the WBFJA was founded. That was the time when WBFJA decided to be the successor of BFJA by giving awards honouring excellence in Bengali Cinema in particular.

In 2017, four years after its establishment, WBFJA decided to hold their first award ceremony and to honor the Bengali films of the previous year. Unlike BFJA, WBFJA Awards are only for the Bengali films. In 2018, after success of their first award show, they announced the 2nd edition of WBFJA Awards. In 2019, they announced their 3rd edition.

== Ceremonies ==
Ceremony	Year	Date	Best Film	Best Director	Best Actor	Best Actress
1st WBFJA Award	2017		Cinemawala	Kaushik Ganguly	Paran Bandopadhyay, Prosenjit Chatterjee	Rituparna Sengupta
2nd WBFJA Award	2018		Mayurakshi	Kaushik Ganguly	Soumitra Chatterjee, Prosenjit Chatterjee	Jaya Ahsan
3rd WBFJA Award	2019	13 January 2019	Pupa	Srijit Mukherji	Jisshu Sengupta	Rituparna Sengupta, Sudipta Chakraborty
4th WBFJA Award	2020	14 January 2020	Nagarkirtan	Kaushik Ganguly	Riddhi Sen	Subhashree Ganguly
5th WBFJA Award	2021-2022	16 January 2022	Borunbabur Bondhu	Anik Dutta	Parambrata Chatterjee, Saswata Chatterjee	Aparajita Auddy
5th WBFJA Award	2021-2022	16 January 2022	Binisutoy	Atanu Ghosh	Ritwick Chakraborty, Paran Bandopadhyay	Jaya Ahsan
6th WBFJA Awards	2023	8 January 2023	Dostojee, Aparajito	Anik Dutta	Dev, Ritwick Chakraborty	Gargi Roychowdhury
7th WBFJA Award	2024	14 January 2024	Shesh Pata	Atanu Ghosh	Prosenjit Chatterjee	Churni Ganguly, Swastika Mukherjee
8th WBFJA Awards	2025	12 January 2025	Manikbabur Megh	Debaloy Bhattacharya Srijit Mukherji	Chandan Sen	Rituparna Sengupta
9th WBFJA Awards	2026	11 January 2026	Mayanagar	Srijit Mukherji	Dev, Parambrata Chatterjee	Subhashree Ganguly

== Awards ==
WBFJA has 18 awards in the popular category and 8 awards in the technical category.

== Popular awards ==
- Best Film
- Best Director
- Best Actor in a Leading Role
- Best Actress in a Leading Role
- Best Actor in a Supporting Role
- Best Actress in a Supporting Role
- Best Actor in a Negative Role
- Best Actor in a Comic Role
- Best Music Director
- Best Male Playback Singer
- Best Female Playback Singer
- Best Background Score
- Most Promising Director
- Most Promising Actor
- Most Promising Actress
- Most Popular Film of the Year
- Most Popular Actor of the Year
- Lifetime Achievement Award

== Technical awards ==
- Best Art Director
- Best Screenplay
- Best Cinematographer
- Best Costume Designer
- Best Sound Designer
- Best Make-Up Artist
- Best Editor
- Best Lyricist

== Lifetime Achievement Award ==
Year	Honouree	Profession	Ref.
2026	Biplab Chatterjee	Actor	
2025	Aparna Sen	Actress	
2024	Sandhya Roy	Actress	
2021	Victor Banerjee	Actor	
2020	Soumendu Roy	Cinematographer	
2019	Buddhadeb Dasgupta	Director	
2018	Tarun Majumdar	Director	
2017	Madhabi Mukherjee	Actress	

== See also ==
- Bengali cinema
