= Basanta Utsav (film) =

2013 Indian Bengali film

- Theatrical release poster
- Directed by: Rhitobrata Bhattacharya
- Release date: March 2013
- Country: India
- Language: Bengali

Basanta Utsav is a 2013 Indian Bengali film directed by Rhitobrata Bhattacharya. Holi, the Indian festival is the backdrop of the film. There are five different stories in the film.

== Plot ==
Basanta Utsav is an anthology of five independently shot films that revolve around love, desire, and relationships. The stories are written by Samantak Ghosh and Rhitobrata.

== Cast ==
- Parambrata Chatterjee
- Pijush Ganguly
- Paoli Dam
- Swastika Mukherjee
- Rudranil Ghosh
- Gargi RoyChowdhury

== See also ==
- Bye Bye Bangkok
