= Arundhati (given name) =

Arundhati is an Indian given name. Notable people with the name include:

- Arundhati Ghose (born 1940), Indian diplomat
- Arundhati Ghosh (born 1960), cricketer
- Arundhati Kirkire (born 1980), cricketer
- Arundhati Nag (born 1956), polyglot actress
- Arundhati Pantawane (born 1989), Indian Badminton Player
- Arundhati Roy (born 1961), writer
- Arundhati Reddy, cricketer
- Arundhati Virmani (born 1957), historian and academic
