= The Academy of Fine Arts (film) =

2025 Indian film by Jayabrata Das

- Theatrical release poster
- Directed by: Jayabrata Das
- Written by: Jayabrata Das
- Produced by: Prateek Chakravorty; Manab Saha; Sanket Mishra; Soumya Sarkar; Jayabrata Das
- Starring: Rudranil Ghosh; Saurav Das; Paayel Sarkar; Rishav Basu; Rahul Banerjee; Anuradha Mukherjee; Amit Saha; Sudip Mukherjee; Anindya Pulak Banerjee
- Cinematography: Arnab Laha
- Edited by: Ashik Sharkar
- Music by: Soumya Rit
- Production companies: Pramod Films; Cinenic Studios
- Distributed by: SSR Cinemas
- Release date: 21 November 2025
- Running time: 149 minutes
- Country: India
- Language: Bengali

The Academy of Fine Arts is a 2025 Indian Bengali-language independent black comedy heist film written, co-produced and directed by Jayabrata Das in his directorial debut. Produced by Prateek Chakravorty, Manab Saha, Sanket Mishra, Jayabrata Das & Soumya Sarkar under their respective banners of Pramod Films and Cinenic Studios, the film stars an ensemble cast of Rudranil Ghosh, Saurav Das, Paayel Sarkar, Rishav Basu, Rahul Banerjee, Amit Saha, Sudip Mukherjee and Anuradha Mukherjee. It follows a group of criminals whose heist of a rare liquor bottle unravels into betrayal and violence, pushing each of them into a deadly fight for survival.

Das developed the script in May 2021 while studying in Satyajit Ray Film and Television Institute, conceiving the plot out of chronological order. Principal photography commenced in November 2021 and wrapped by in July 2023. Music of the film is composed by Soumyo Rit, while Arnab Laha and Ashik Sharkar handling its cinematography and editing respectively. The film is executive produced by Manab Saha and Sanket Mishra.

Initially slated for release on 14 November 2025, AOFA was postponed and then released theatrically on 21 November 2025. It was featured at the 20th Jogja NETPAC Asian Film Festival, standing out as the only Bengali film selection.

AOFA has been noted for its self-referential style, beginning with a title card providing two dictionary definitions of “pulp”. Critics have compared its blend of ironic humour and graphic violence to the works of Quentin Tarantino, especially Reservoir Dogs (1992) and Pulp Fiction (1994).

== Plot ==
The film opens with two thieves, Dodo and Jojo celebrating the successful theft of an antique wine bottle known as the McGuffin. Their amusement turns to shock when they discover that the ₹4 lakh they were paid is only a fraction of the bottle's actual value of about ₹20 crore. Feeling cheated, one of the thieves becomes enraged; the scene immediately cuts to his death at the hands of Jibon Das and his associate, Sachin Talapatra. The second thief is captured and placed in the trunk of their car for interrogation regarding the location of the stolen bottle.

Before leaving, Sachin discovers a card that falls from the car's visor, offering a one-time payment of ₹2 crore for an unspecified job, signed by someone named Porichoy Gupto. Jiban reveals that he also received a similar card, containing a date, time, and venue for a meeting to learn more about the assignment. Although both men work under a mafia overlord named Kim Lin, they decide to follow the lead due to the substantial reward.

At the designated restaurant, Jiban and Sachin find several other members of Kim Ling's gang, each of whom also received identical cards. A montage introduces the group: Bireshwar Bal, a mute meat enthusiast and skilled lock picker; Dinabandhu, the mastermind behind the Porichoy Gupto scheme; and Rakhal Pakrashi, rumoured to have risen to Kim Lin's inner circle through manipulation involving her sister.

While waiting for Porichoy Gupta—who never appears—the gang grows increasingly impatient. During the commotion, Jiban assaults a man harassing his girlfriend, heightening the disorder in the restaurant. Sensing the rising tension, Dinabandhu intentionally drops a fork and asks Bireshwar to retrieve it. When Bireshwar reaches under the table, he discovers a recorder taped beneath it. Believing it to be from Porichoy Gupto, the group removes the device and plays the recording, propelling the narrative into the central mystery.

== Cast ==
- Rudranil Ghosh as Dinabandhu "Dinu" Mitra / Porichoy Gupta
- Saurav Das as Jibon Das
- Paayel Sarkar as Richa Sen
- Rishav Basu as Sachin Talapatra
- Rahul Banerjee as Rakhal Pakrashi
- Sudip Mukherjee as Kim Ling / Swapan
- Anuradha Mukherjee as Esha Chakraborty, Dinu's girlfriend
- Amit Saha as Bireshwar Bal
- Anindya Pulak Banerjee as Dodo
- Raju Majumder as Jojo
- Rishika Nag as Arunima, Sachin's girlfriend
- Jaya Chatterjee as Jaya, Jibon's wife (deceased)
- Anjan Roy Chowdhury as Jyotishko Banerjee / Madman

=== Special appearance ===
- John Bhattacharya in the item number "Churi Chhara Kaaj Nei"
- Darshana Banik in the item number "Churi Chhara Kaaj Nei"

== Production ==
=== Development ===
During his studies in Satyajit Ray Film and Television Institute, Jayabrata Das began working on the script of AOFA in 2019, and finished over a period of two years, also approaching producers who were not willing to finance the project, until his friends Sanket Mishra and Manab Saha agreed to do so. The film was invested in by both Mishra and Saha equally, with Das himself as a co-producer.

According to Das, AOFA is a homage to Quentin Tarantino's Pulp Fiction (1994); he also added Reservoir Dogs (1992) as one of his inspirations while writing the script. After taking down a scene, he used to wait for a week as he believed that for a film with twists and turns, the narrative would have a chance to jump, thereby giving scope for cinematic liberties. For the same, whenever the idea for a plot twist came to him, Das used to work on it for three to four weeks. The film's title refers metaphorically to the characters’ craftsmanship in crime, each being an “artist” in their own skill.

=== Pre-production ===
Das approached Rudranil Ghosh to play the role of Dinu in the film, who nodded and decided to do the film without any remuneration. He introduced Das to Soumyo Sarkar, one of the key-producers of the film who was in talks with Ghosh for another project. Then the film was produced under Sarkar's home banner Cinenic Studios.

== Marketing ==
The trailer of the film was released on 3 November 2025. The song "Churi Chara Kaaj Nei: The OG" featuring Darshana Banik and John Bhattacharya was released on 10 November 2025 only for promotion, also with a quote "because producers wanted this".

== Release ==
The film was initially scheduled to release theatrically on 14 November 2025. However the release was stalled after the Federation of Cine Technicians and Workers of Eastern India (FCTWEI) objected to the film, claiming it used technicians not affiliated to the Federation and was being wrongly labelled as a “student film.” The release was blocked until old dues from one of the producers were cleared. After the payments were settled and the guild's conditions were met, the film was finally released a week later, on 21 November 2025.

== Reception ==
Eshna Bhattacharya of The Times Of India rated the film 4 stars out of 5 and wrote "Every technical element, from sound design to camera movement, appears intentional, reflecting a careful attention to detail. Collectively, these aspects give the film a confidence and cohesion, making it a technically accomplished debut that matches its ambitious narrative vision." Shampali Moulik of Sangbad Pratidin opined "Jayabrata has made a film rich in style. The position of the criminals was understood, but the faces of ordinary Bengalis look so grim. Rudranil's dialogue breaking the fourth wall is not bad, but it would have been better if it was less intense." She also criticized the intimate scenes needed to be more mature.

Addressing the film as "A promise for future cinema", Ei Samay critic Rinika Ray Chowdhury quoted "The narrative style inspired by manga comics, brings in stylized depictions of sex and violence, especially in the character played by Amit Saha. The director and technical team are all students of SRFTI, so naturally there is a strong film-school influence." She also criticized its screenplay containing some disjointed narrative elements. A reviewer of Anandabazar Patrika wrote "There is violence, but there is no celebration of it. For fans of black comedies, action dramas and larger-than-life protagonists, this might just hit the mark."

== Future ==
In an interview to Anandabazar Patrika, Das revealed about his plan to make a prequel of AOFA, under the title Academy: Minus One.
