= West Bengal Film Journalists' Association Award for Best Actor =

Annual Indian film award

WBFJA for Best Actor
- Awarded for: Best Performance by an Actor in a Leading Role
- Country: India
- Presented by: West Bengal Film Journalists' Association
- Final award: 2026
- Most Recent Winner: Parambrata Chatterjee for Killbill Society and Dev for Projapati 2

The West Bengal Film Journalists' Association Award for Best Actor in a leading role is given by the WBFJA as a part of its annual West Bengal Film Journalists' Association Awards for Bengali films, to recognize the best actor in a film released in the previous year.

== Superlatives ==
Category	Name	Superlative
Most Awards	Prosenjit Chatterjee	3 awards
Most Nominations	Prosenjit Chatterjee, Parambrata Chatterjee	5 nominations
Most Nominations without a Win	Anirban Bhattacharya, Arjun Chakraborty	2 Nominations

== List of winners ==
=== Winners ===
Year	Winner	Film
2017	Paran Bandopadhyay	Cinemawala
2017	Prosenjit Chatterjee	Khawto
2018	Soumitra Chatterjee	Mayurakshi
2018	Prosenjit Chatterjee	Mayurakshi
2019	Jisshu Sengupta	Ek Je Chhilo Raja
2020	Riddhi Sen	Nagarkirtan
2021	Parambrata Chatterjee	Dwitiyo Purush
2021	Saswata Chatterjee	Chobiyal
2022	Ritwick Chakraborty	Binisutoy
2022	Paran Bandopadhyay	Tonic
2023	Dev	Projapoti
2023	Ritwick Chakraborty	Ananta: The Eternal
2024	Prosenjit Chatterjee	Shesh Pata
2025	Chandan Sen	Manikbabur Megh
2026	Parambrata Chatterjee	Killbill Society
2026	Dev	Projapati 2

=== Nominations ===
- 2017 Paran Bandopadhyay – Cinemawala as Pranabendu Das and Prosenjit Chatterjee – Khawto as Nirbed Lahiri/Dhrubo (tie)
  - Anjan Dutt – Shaheb Bibi Golaam as Jimmy
  - Debshankar Haldar – Maya Mridango as Jhakshu Ustad
  - Jisshu Sengupta – Byomkesh O Chiriyakhana as Byomkesh Bakshi
- 2018 Soumitra Chatterjee – Mayurakshi as Sushovan and Prosenjit Chatterjee – Mayurakshi as Aryanil (tie)
  - Ritwick Chakraborty – Maacher Jhol as Dev D aka Devdatto
  - Anirban Bhattacharya – Dhananjay as Dhananjoy Chatterjee
  - Jisshu Sengupta – Posto as Arnab Lahiri
  - Parambrata Chatterjee – Samantaral as Sujan
- 2019 Jisshu Sengupta – Ek Je Chhilo Raja as Raja Mahendra Kumar Chowdhury
  - Jisshu Sengupta – Ghare & Baire as Amit
  - Saswata Chatterjee – Ray as Director
  - Prosenjit Chatterjee – Drishtikone as Jion Mitra
  - Adil Hussain – Maati as Jamil
- 2020 Riddhi Sen – Nagarkirtan as Puti
  - Ritwick Chakraborty – Nagarkirtan as Madhu
  - Rudranil Ghosh – Vinci Da as Vinci Da
  - Prosenjit Chatterjee – Drishtikone as Jion Mitra
  - Shiboprosad Mukherjee – Konthho as RJ Arjun Mallik
  - Kaushik Ganguly – Kedara as Narasingha
- 2021 Parambrata Chatterjee for Dwitiyo Purush as Abhijit Pakrashi/Khoka and Saswata Chatterjee for Chobiyal as Habol
  - Anirban Bhattacharya - Dracula Sir as Amal / Raktim
  - Jeet - Asur as Kigan Mandi
- 2022 Ritwik Chakraborty - Binisutoy as Kajal Sarkar and Paran Bandopadhyay - Tonic as Jaladhar Sen
  - Mosharraf Karim - Dictionary
  - Saswata Chatterjee - Tokhon Kuasa Chilo
  - Arjun Chakrabarty - Avijatrik as Apu
- 2023 Dev – Projapoti as Joy Chakraborty and Ritwick Chakraborty – Ananta: The Eternal as Mr. Shuvo
  - Arjun Chakraborty – X=Prem as Arnab
  - Bratya Basu – Jhora Palok as Jibanananda Das
  - Parambrata Chatterjee – Habji Gabji as Aditya Basu
  - Riddhi Sen – Bismillah as Bismillah a.k.a. Bishu
- 2024 Prosenjit Chatterjee – Shesh Pata as Balmiki Sengupta
  - Abir Chatterjee – Maayakumari as Kanan Kumar and Ahir Chatterjee
  - Anjan Dutt – Palan
  - Parambrata Chatterjee – Shibpur as Sultan Ahmed
- 2025 Chandan Sen – Manikbabur Megh as Manik Babu
  - Abir Chatterjee – Shri Swapankumarer Badami Hyenar Kobole as Dipak Chatterjee
  - Anjan Dutt – Chaalchitra Ekhon as Kunal Sen
  - Dev – Tekka as Iqlakh Alam
  - Tota Roy Chowdhury – Chaalchitro: The Frame Fatale as Kanishka Chatterjee
- 2026 Parambrata Chatterjee – Killbill Society as Mrityunjoy Kar / Ananda Kar and Dev – Projapati 2 as Joy Chakraborty
  - Abir Chatterjee – Putulnacher Itikatha as Shasi
  - Vikram Chatterjee – Omorshongi as Anurag
  - Anirban Chakrabarti – The Eken: Benaras e Bibhishika as Ekendra Sen aka Eken Babu

== See also ==
- West Bengal Film Journalists' Association Awards
- Cinema of India
