= Doodhpither Gachh =

2020 Indian Bengali film

- Release poster
- Bengali: দুধপিঠের গাছ
- Directed by: Ujjwal Basu
- Written by: Ujjwal Basu
- Screenplay by: Ujjwal Basu
- Story by: Ujjwal Basu
- Produced by: Payel Chakraborty Bhattacharyya & 1126 Producers
- Starring: Daminee Benny Basu; Kaushik Roy; Shibani Maity; Harshil Das
- Cinematography: Santanu Banerjee
- Edited by: Anirban Maity
- Music by: Joy Sarkar
- Production company: ACL Movies
- Distributed by: Shyamsakha
- Release date: 21 October 2020
- Running time: 106 minutes
- Country: India
- Language: Bengali

Doodhpither Gachh is a crowd funded Indian Bengali film. It was funded by 930 families from the village 'Aranghata' located in Nadia district of West Bengal and 196 cinema enthusiasts from within the country and abroad. It has been written and directed by debutant director Ujjwal Basu. The music of the film is composed by Joy Sarkar. Featuring Daminee Benny Basu, Kaushik Roy, Shibani Maity and Harshil Das, the film revolves around the activities of a seven years old country boy Gour, who has speech impediment. The film was released theatrically on 21 October 2020 coinciding with Durga puja.

== Plot ==
Gour (Harshil Das), a 7 years old country boy, can't speak properly due to speech disorder. He lives with his two sisters, Lakkhi (Riya Das) and Basanti (Debangana Gon), along with his parents. The children run around almost always. They reach school late mostly; quarrels with classmates; throw stones at jujube tree of other and pick off jujube without taking permission; they go away in foggy morning to collect date palm juice; and sometimes watch movies standing outside of neighbour's house. Gour eats rice cake made by his mother (Beny Basu) and imagines of rice cake tree. His tender mind believes that rice cake tree exists likewise other fruit bearing trees. From this belief he sows a rice cake, waters it and waits for the sprouting. One day his grandmother (Shibani Maity) comes to their home. The children listen to their grandmother's tale in the evening. She says that she will go to Kashi, the sacred place of Lord Shiva. Then Gour asks her if there are milky rice cake trees at Kashi. Grandmother makes fun of his words and tells that there so many different kind of cake trees are found. Next day Lakkhi shows grandmother the place where his brother plants a rice cake and a sapling also emerges. Gour asks to grandmother, “Is this a rice cake tree?” She smiles and indulges which invigorates his belief. He fantasizes a new world where various rice cake trees are supposed to exist. Infantile mind wants to wing to that land. His friend Raju also encourages him telling there are big trees bearing big rice cakes at Kashi and Gour must not give up the chance to go with his grandmother. Sitting in the classroom Gour see his grandmother passes by. He finds excuse to leave the classroom and starts going after her grandmother. He catches the same train where her grandmother gets on. Finally they meet at a lonely railway station and takes shelter at a hermitage for the night as no more train to halt until next morning. Next morning his grandmother is found dead, but her unexpected death doesn't touch his mind and he runs away from there to catch train which he believes will take away him to his dreamland. The film ends with a kirtan being sung by different groups from different places.

== Cast ==
- Daminee Benny Basu
- Kaushik Roy
- Shibani Maity
- Harshil Das
- Debangana Gon
- Riya Das
