= Dracula Sir =

Indian Bengali horror film

- Release poster
- Directed by: Debaloy Bhattacharya
- Written by: Debaloy Bhattacharya; Kallol Lahiri
- Produced by: Shrikant Mohata; Mahendra Soni
- Starring: Anirban Bhattacharya; Mimi Chakraborty
- Cinematography: Indranath Marick
- Edited by: Sanglap Bhowmick
- Music by: Amit Chatterjee; Ishan Mitra; Saqi; Durjoy
- Production company: Shree Venkatesh Films
- Release date: 21 October 2020
- Country: India
- Language: Bengali

Dracula Sir is a 2020 Indian Bengali language, non-linear, neo noir psychological thriller film directed by Debaloy Bhattacharya and produced by Shrikant Mohata and Mahendra Soni under the banner of SVF. The film starring Anirban Bhattacharya, Mimi Chakraborty, Bidipta Chakraborty, Rudranil Ghosh, Samiul Alam, Kanchan Mullick, Supriyo Dutta follows the story of a school teacher with a protruding pair of canine teeth, called "Dracula Sir." The film is based on a school teacher who was a Naxalite in his past life.

The film was released in theaters on October 21, 2020, coinciding with Puja holidays. The film was initially scheduled for release on May 1, 2020, but was postponed due to the COVID-19 pandemic. Upon release, Dracula Sir received positive to mixed reviews. Critics praised the performances (Anirban Bhattacharya), music, costuming, and makeup, but found the screenplay flawed. The film is based around the story of a revolutionary, during the Naxalbari revolution. It was a CPIML party based revolutionary movement around West Bengal which lasted until the 1970s.

== Synopsis ==
This non-linear structured story tells events that happened in two eras. The story jumps from the present era, where Raktim is a school teacher, to the story of Amal, an extremist of the '70s, in the house of his ex-girlfriend Manjari.

In the early '70s, Amal, a Naxalite, flees to the home of Manjari. The film tells a tale with a reincarnation spin. In 2020, Raktim Chowdhury is a temporary Bengali teacher in a school in Hooghly. The students wrote 'Dracula Sir' on the blackboard due to his two protruding teeth. Raktim learns about Amal, how he was hiding in Manjari's house and how Manjari could not save him from getting arrested. The tale moved him very much. Raktim starts to think himself as the reincarnation of Amal. He starts to hallucinate about Manjari.

Later, he is taken to psychiatrists who discover that he has a mental disorder and as a result, is associating himself with Amal. Raktim gradually gets cured after gathering enough evidence of not being Amal. He finally meets the real Amal, an old man who was once a naxalite, thus proving he is not Amal's reincarnation. However, Raktim later visits Manjari's house, where Amal is hiding. In the house, Raktim finds a photograph of Manjari with a person who looks exactly like him. Raktim starts to hallucinate Manjari again and tells the audience,"Is it any disorder or memories from the past life? Let's keep the question aside".

== Cast ==
- Anirban Bhattacharya as Amal / Raktim/ Manjari's unnamed husband
- Mimi Chakraborty as Manjari
- Bidipta Chakraborty as Sobita
- Rudranil Ghosh as Katu Mallick
- Samiul Alam as Nata
- Supriyo Dutta as Bhuban Babu (Katu)
- Kanchan Mullick as the psychiatrist
- Saayoni Ghosh in a special appearance

== Soundtrack ==
Dracula Sir

Soundtrack album by Amit - Ishan
- Released: 12 October 2020
- Recorded: 2020
- Studio: Bombay Studio
- Genre: Feature film soundtrack
- Language: Bengali
- Label: SVF

The film's soundtrack is composed by Amit- Ishan, Saqi Banerjee and Durjoy, while lyrics are written by Saqi, Ritam Sen and Debaloy Bhattacharya.

Track listing
No.	Title	Lyrics	Music	Singer(s)	Length
1.	"Raat Pohale"	Debaloy Bhattacharya	Amit- Ishan	Ishan Mitra	4:10
2.	"Abar Jonmo Nebo"	Saqi Banerjee	Saqi Banerjee	Ishan Mitra	5:14
3.	"Priyotama"	Ritam Sen	Durjoy Choudhury	Anirban Bhattacharya	3:46

== Reception ==
Madhumanti Pait Chowdhury, reviewing for Anandabazar Patrika, felt that the backstory of the Naxal movement was needed to establish the characters. He noticed that several scenes in the film, as well as Dracula's costume, were similar to Todd Phillips's Joker. Chowdhury opined that stylization has been given importance by creating some scenes for the sake of cinematic beauty. Chowdhury praised Indranath Marik's cinematography and screenplay by Debalaya and Kallol Lahiri, as some aspects were beautifully woven. Chowdhury also praised the film score, acting of Anirban, Vidipta Chakraborty, Supriya Dutt, Kanchan Mallick and Rudranil Ghosh but felt that Anirban-Mimi chemistry needed to boost up. Chowdhury opined that the time-travel, the union of the real and the surreal has taken shape in the film divided into eight episodes.

Debolina Sen, writing for Times of India, gave three out of five stars and termed it as "A complex tale of life, love and rebirth." Agreeing with Chowdhury, Sen praised the music, costume and makeup. She found the screenplay engaging but not without flaws, but its direction was clear and to-the-point. She also felt that the costume designs were similar to the 2019 film Joker. She praised Anirban for portrayals of two different characters of Raktim and Amol from two different eras. Concluding the review, she opined, "Dracula Sir is a passionate piece of work that seems to lack in reason at times. But yes, it's a film you shouldn't give a miss." Sankhayan Ghosh, writing for Film Companion, opined that the film was neither a good story nor fun. He felt it was mildly irritating as shortcomings of the screenplay were glossed over with music-video like passages.

== Award and nomination ==
Year	Award	Category	Recipient/ Nominee	Result	Ref.
2021	West Bengal Film Journalists' Association Awards	Best Film	Dracula Sir	Nominated	
2021	West Bengal Film Journalists' Association Awards	Best Director	Debaloy Bhattacharya	Nominated	
2021	West Bengal Film Journalists' Association Awards	Best Actor	Anirban Bhattacharya	Nominated	
2021	West Bengal Film Journalists' Association Awards	Best Supporting Actress	Bidipta Chakraborty	Won	
2021	West Bengal Film Journalists' Association Awards	Best Male Playback Singer	Ishan Mitra	Won	
