= Kedara =

2019 slice of life Bengali film

- Directed by: Indraadip Dasgupta
- Written by: Srijato
- Produced by: Samiran Das (Kaleidoscope)
- Starring: Kaushik Ganguly; Rudranil Ghosh; Joydeep Kundu; Moushumi Sanyal Dasgupta; Indranil Roy
- Cinematography: Subhankar Bhar
- Edited by: Sujay Datta Ray
- Music by: Arijit Singh
- Production company: Kaleidoscope
- Release date: November 1, 2019
- Country: India
- Language: Bengali

Kedara is a 2019 Indian Bengali language slice of life film directed by Indraadip Dasgupta, and produced by Samiran Das under the banner of Kaleidoscope. Starring Kaushik Ganguly and Rudranil Ghosh, it was released on 1 November 2019. This is the directorial debut film of Indraadip Dasgupta. Its music was composed by Arijit Singh.

== Plot ==
Narasingha is a ventriloquist who lost his livelihood when the relevance of his art started to fade. He lives alone in a decrepit ancestral house, having separated from his wife. He has fictitious dialogues with people from his past, mimicking their voices with remarkable accuracy.

Resigned to life under the shadow of his memories, he breaks bread with a junk dealer, Keshto. Keshto presents him with an armchair, something he had always wanted. The armchair acts as a catalyst to transform his personality, restoring his confidence and bravado. However, the transformation comes at the cost of his sanity, leading to a series of misfortunes and unexpected turns.

== Cast ==
- Kaushik Ganguly as Narasingha
- Rudranil Ghosh as Keshto
- Joydeep Kundu
- Moushumi Sanyal Dasgupta
- Indranil Roy
- Debargha Bose

== Awards ==
66th National Film Awards

- Special Jury Award – Indradip Dasgupta

West Bengal Film Journalists' Association Awards

- Best Supporting Actor, Most Promising Director, Best Cinematographer
