= Shironam =

2020 Indian Bengali film

- Directed by: Indranil Ghosh
- Written by: Indranil Ghosh
- Produced by: Kaustav Ray
- Starring: Jisshu Sengupta; Swastika Mukherjee; Saswata Chatterjee
- Production company: R P Techvision
- Release date: 21 October 2020
- Country: India
- Language: Bengali

Shironam (lit. 'Headline') is an Indian Bengali language drama film directed by Indranil Ghosh and features Jisshu Sengupta, Swastika Mukherjee and Saswata Chatterjee under the banner of R P Techvision.

The film was released in theatres on 21 October 2020, coinciding with Puja holidays.

== Cast ==
- Jisshu Sengupta
- Saswata Chatterjee
- Swastika Mukherjee
- Anjan Dutt
- Santilal Mukherjee

== Release ==
The film was made back in 2017. after Travelling some Festivals it rereleased in Pujo 2020 with Positive Reviews.
