= Surjo Prithibir Chardike Ghore =

- Directed by: Arijit Biswas
- Written by: Arijit Biswas
- Cinematography: Sirsha Ray
- Music by: Prabuddha Banerjee
- Production company: AVA Film Productions
- Release date: 29 November 2019
- Running time: 116 minutes
- Country: India
- Language: Bengali

Surjo Prithibir Chardike Ghore (English translation: Sun Goes Around the Earth) is an Indian Bengali film directed by Arijit Biswas and based on the life of K. C. Paul. It is produced by AVA Film Productions. The movie was theatrically released on 29 November 2019.

== Cast ==
- Meghnad Bhattacharya as TC Paul
- Chiranjeet Chakraborty
- Anjan Dutt
- Pallavi Chatterjee
- Paran Bandhopadhyay
- Kabir Suman
