= Debaloy Bhattacharya =

Indian Bengali director, screenwriter and editor

- Born: 7 May 1976 (age 50); Kolkata
- Occupations: Director; Screenwriter; Editor; Actor
- Spouse: Mekhala Bhattacharya
- Children: Kabir Bhattacharya

Debaloy Bhattacharya (দেবালয় ভট্টাচার্য) is an Indian film director, screenwriter, editor and actor predominantly associated with Bengali film industry. He is best known for directing the films Dracula Sir (2020) and Shri Swapankumarer Badami Hyenar Kobole (2024), and the web series Montu Pilot and Indubala Bhaater Hotel.

Bhattacharya debuted as an editor with the film Shoonya (2006) and also served as a screenwriter in a few films. He made his directorial debut with Roga Howar Sohoj Upay (2015). Holy Faak (2017) marked his directorial web series debut.

== Career ==
Bhattacharya started his career in the Indian film industry as an editor, debuting with Shoonya (2006). He again worked as an editor in 033 (2009), which marked his debut as a screenwriter in a feature film. He has written the screenplay, story, and dialogues for several Bengali films including Obhishopto Nighty (2014), Golpo Holeo Shotti (2014) and Roga Howar Sohoj Upay (2015). The latter marked his debut as a director. He made his web series debut in 2017, directing Holy Faak on Hoichoi. In the same year, he directed the first season of Dupur Thakurpo.

In 2018, he directed Bidaay Byomkesh, a Bengali drama starring Abir Chatterjee in the titular role. He has also directed the critically acclaimed Biday Byomkesh (2018) and Dracula Sir (2020). In 2020, he directed the first season of Montu Pilot and has directed all of its following seasons — Season 2 (2022) and Season 3 (2026). In 2023, he directed the highly acclaimed web series Indubala Bhaater Hotel streamed on Hoichoi. P.I. Meena (2023) marked his directorial debut in Hindi OTT. In 2024, he directed Shri Swapankumarer Badami Hyenar Kobole, the first project of Hoichoi Studios.

== Filmography ==
List of films
Year	Film	Director	Writer	Editor	Actor	Notes	Ref.
2006	Shoonya	No	No	Yes	No	Debut film	
2009	033	No	Yes	Yes	No		
2011	Michael	No	Yes	No	No	Hindi film debut; Co-written with Ribhu Dasgupta	
2014	Obhishopto Nighty	No	Yes	No	Yes		
2014	Golpo Holeo Shotti	No	Yes	No	No		
2015	Roga Howar Sohoj Upay	Yes	Yes	No	No	Marked his debut as a director	
2016	Cinemawala	No	No	No	Yes		
2018	Teen Cup Chaa	Yes	No	No	No	Web film released on Hoichoi	
2018	Bidaay Byomkesh	Yes	Yes	No	No		
2020	Dracula Sir	Yes	Yes	No	No		
2024	Shri Swapankumarer Badami Hyenar Kobole	Yes	Yes	No	No		

== Web series ==
List of web series
Year	Series	Director	Writer	Platform	Notes	Ref.
2017	Holy Faak	Yes	No	Hoichoi	Directorial web series debut	
2017	Dupur Thakurpo	Yes	No	Hoichoi		
2018	Charitraheen	Yes	Yes	Hoichoi		
2018	Holy Faak 2	Yes	No	Hoichoi	Season 2	
2019	Bou Keno Psycho	Yes	Yes	Hoichoi		
2019	Charitraheen 2	Yes	Yes	Hoichoi	Season 2	
2020	Pabitra Puppies	Yes	Yes	Hoichoi		
2020	Charitraheen 3	Yes	Yes	Hoichoi	Season 3	
2020	Montu Pilot	Yes	Yes	Hoichoi		
2022	Montu Pilot 2	Yes	Yes	Hoichoi	Season 2	
2023	Indubala Bhaater Hotel	Yes	No	Hoichoi		
2023	P I Meena	Yes	No	Amazon Prime Video	Marked his Hindi directorial web series debut	
2026	Montu Pilot 3	Yes	Yes	Hoichoi	Season 3	
2026	Gorkyr Maa	Yes	Unknown	Fridaay	Season 1	
