= Love Aaj Kal Porshu =

2020 Indian Bengali film

- Theatrical release poster
- Directed by: Pratim D. Gupta
- Written by: Pratim D. Gupta
- Produced by: Shrikant Mohta & Mahendra Soni
- Starring: Arjun Chakrabarty; Madhumita; Paoli Dam
- Cinematography: Subhankar Bhar
- Edited by: Sanglap Bhowmick
- Music by: Arindom Chatterjee
- Production company: SVF Entertainment
- Distributed by: SVF Entertainment
- Release date: 14 February 2020
- Country: India
- Language: Bengali

Love Aaj Kal Porshu is an Indian Bengali-language science fiction romantic drama film written and directed by Pratim D. Gupta. Produced by Shrikant Mohta and Mahendra Soni under the banner of Shree Venkatesh Films, the film stars Arjun Chakraborty, Madhumita in the lead roles while Paoli Dam and Abhijit Guha play other pivotal roles.

The story is inspired by two Jim Carrey movies, Eternal Sunshine of a Spotless Mind and The Truman Show. The film was released in the theatres on 14 February 2020, coinciding with Valentine's Day.

== Synopsis ==
The film revolves around the timeline of three days - yesterday, today and tomorrow. Kalki Maitra is the owner of Paradise Hotel and also the producer of a television show titled "Prothom Dekha", which is about the story of two strangers who meet for the first time. The lead pair working in show, wake up everyday with a new identity, as a completely changed person. As a result, the prothom dekha or first meetup takes place between different people on each of the three days. On one day, the first meet up takes place at a coffee shop between a cricketer Tripti and singer Abhirup while on another day, the meet up occurs between business reporter Abhishek and a model Tapsee. Another day, Abhijit meets Tania.

Mr. Batuk is the person who makes these daily identity changes. With the help of an innovative technology, every nights he puts in several new information into the brain of Arjun and Madhumita. As a result, it creates new memories in their brain overnight. When they wake up in the morning, he or she is a completely different person, with no connections from the previous day. Abhishek not knows Abhirup nor does Tapsee know Tripti. In this manner, the same people are falling in love everyday, but with a different character. Further, the true identity of the characters are revealed along with information about the longevity of a first meet up of this kind.

== Cast ==
- Arjun Chakrabarty as Avik a.k.a. Avishek / Abhijit / Abhirup
- Madhumita as Tista a.k.a. Tania / Tapsee / Tripti
- Paoli Dam as Kalki Maitra
- Anindita Bose as Leena
- Anirban Chakrabarti Chakrabarti as Ganesh
- Abhijit Guha as Botuk

== Production ==
=== Development ===
In an interview with The Telegraph, the director revealed that the title of the film is suggestive of the idea of the eternal nature of love, which exists between the lead duo across three days; yesterday, today and tomorrow. He revealed that he came up with the idea of this film from his observation asa to how everything around us slowly becoming doctored. He mentioned that we are told who to worship and who to not, what to eat and what not and were are being brainwashed about who is a hero and who is a villain. He wanted to present this troubling thought persisting in our society through an entertaining love story.

The Shubh Muhurat of the film took place at the SVF office on 15 October 2019. The Shubh Muhurat ceremony was also shared by the Muhurat of Srijit Mukherji's then upcoming film, Dwitiyo Purush. The shooting of the film was started from the second week of November 2019 and was wrapped by December 2019.

=== Casting ===
Initially, he decided to cast Ritwick Chakraborty but changed his decision to cast Jisshu Sengupta, after completing the final draft. But due to date issues of Jisshu, he was replaced by Arjun as the male lead. Madhumita Sarcar was his first choice for the script. Paoli Dam agreed to play a negative shaded role in the film, owing to the character of Kalki Mitra in the film. In an interview with The Times of India, Madhumita mentioned that initially she was skeptical about the kissing scenes and steamy scenes in the movie as the audience is used to her image of a traditional girl wearing saree or salwar from her previous films. But after shooting a few, she mentioned that she was comfortable with those scenes.

=== Marketing ===
The official teaser of film was released on 31 December 2019 by Shree Venkatesh Films. The trailer was released on 1 February 2020. The event was marked by music performances from Dev Arijit and Nikhita Gandhi. A special screening of the film was held on 20 February 2020, which was attended by young and newcomer actors, actresses and musicians in the industry.

== Soundtrack ==
Love Aaj Kal Porshu

Soundtrack album by Arindom Chatterjee
- Released: 2020
- Recorded: 2019
- Genre: Film soundtrack
- Length: 12:21
- Language: Bengali
- Label: SVF
- Producers: Shrikant Mohta; Mahendra Soni

The music of the film has been composed by Arindom Chatterjee. The lyrics have been penned by Prasen.

The first single "Shune Ne" was released on 14 January 2020. The second single "Aye Dekhe Jaa" was released on 9 February 2020. The third single "Tomay Notun Kore" was released on 16 February 2020.

Track listing
No.	Title	Singer	Length
1.	"Aye Dekhe Jaa"	Arijit Singh	3:01
2.	"Shune Ne"	Dev Arijit, Nikhita Gandhi	2:45
3.	"Tomay Notun Kore"	Shaheb Chattopadhyay	3:15
4.	"Shune Ne Reprise"	Ash King, Nikhita Gandhi	3:20
Total length:			12:21

== Release ==
The film was released in the theatres on 14 February 2020, on the celebration of Valentine's Day.

== Reception ==
=== Critical reception ===
Antara Chakraborthy of The Indian Express reviewed the film and opined " Love Aaj Kal Porshu is a Bengali romantic drama that can be explained as a cross between Groundhog Day, The Truman’s Show and Love Aaj Kal." Roushani Sarkar of Cinestaan reviewed the film and wrote " The film delivers a mixed experience, leaving the viewer confused whether to focus on the elements of romance in the movie or the twists and turns in the plot. Overall, Love Aaj Kal Porshu does not fascinate the viewer with its twists. It keeps the audience hooked with the anticipation of making sense of the narrative."

Indradutta Basu of Anandabazar Patrika reviewed the film and noted "The film successfully depicts the new generation definition of love but fails to utilise the true potential of the script due to the weak screenplay. Although the director wanted to focus on love, but bits of science fiction, technology and thrill spoils the broth." She praised the Arjun and Madhumita's acting and the music but criticised the fact that the film shows the use of advanced technology but the lifestyle of the people is completely normal.

Shamayita Chakraborty of The Times of India gave the film 3.5/5 calling it "a whiff of fresh air". Raving about the movie, the review said: "It brings in an unusual flavour in Bengali cinema. It thrills you, makes your heart melt in love and most importantly, engages you with its tight script — a perfect concoction for this season of love without being melodramatic." A critic from The Indian Express Bangla rated the film 3/5 stars and wrote "The film loses its appeal and focus from all the genres owing to the weak screenplay. The less focused backstory makes the film lose its reliability." She praised Madhumita's acting but bemoaned not well stringed story.

Bishakha Pal of Sangbad Pratidin reviewed the film and opined "Pratim has successfully maintained the mystrey till the first half of the film. He has been successfully able to explain that love is eternal whereas one night stand is temporary." She praised the director for subtly using humour in the film, the music, acting skills of Arjun, Madhumita and Paoli but mentioned that the climax in the ending could have been better.
