= Cinemawala =

2016 Indian Bengali film

- Poster of Cinemawala
- Directed by: Kaushik Ganguly
- Produced by: Shrikant Mohta; Mahendra Soni
- Starring: Paran Bandyopadhyay; Parambrata Chatterjee; Sohini Sarkar
- Cinematography: Soumik Haldar
- Edited by: Subhajit Singha
- Music by: Indraadip Das Gupta
- Production company: Shree Venkatesh Films
- Distributed by: Shree Venkatesh Films
- Release date: 13 May 2016
- Running time: 105 Minutes
- Country: India
- Language: Bengali

Cinemawala is a 2016 Indian Bengali language film directed by Kaushik Ganguly, and starring Paran Bandyopadhyay and Parambrata Chatterjee. The theme of the film is tribute to the single screen cinema halls that are rapidly becoming rare in India.

== Plot summary ==
Pranabendu Bose, an aged man, owns a cinema hall named Kamalini. He is assisted by his long-time assistant Hari. Ever since the trend of digital viewing of cinemas by use of DVD and CDs have gained pace, Kamalini is facing loss. What infuriates Pranabendu the most is that his own son Prakash is engaged in selling illegal CDs and DVDs. The cinema-addict in Pranabendu believes cinema is fit to be seen only in the big screen, and therefore, curses Prakash for denigrating the medium of cinema by selling illegal DVDs. Pranabendu also fears that any day Prakash will be wound up by the police and that will burn his own hard-earned respect to ashes. Such is his disgust for Prakash that when local political leader Sudhanshu requests Pranabendu to stand in local panchayat elections, Pranabendu turns down the offer by saying he can't face questions from people regarding the illegal nature of the business which his own son runs. Beside the cinema hall, Pranabendu and Prakash attend to their long-time family business of distributing fish to vendors. Prakash's wife Moumita is expecting their first child. At home, Pranabendu and Prakash avoid speaking with each other. Moumita, though, takes good care of aged Pranabendu. One night, after returning from Kolkata with a bagful of illegal DVDs, Prakash notices an advertisement in the newspaper about a DVD home theater. Prakash buys a home theater by selling the golden bangles his mother Kamalini, who now lives separately from Pranabendu, gave to him on hearing of Moumita's pregnancy. Prakash, along with his business partner Ashim, arranges for the screening of blockbuster cinemas in the DVD home theater during the time of the local fair. Prakash's plan proves to be a masterstroke. The shows attract houseful audience. He and his partner make loads of money in the process. The success of his son's illegal business breaks Pranabendu's heart. He orders Hari to sell off the projectors in his cinema hall. Next morning, Pranabendu visits the cinema hall in search of Hari. Hari informs him that a local businessman has agreed to buy the projectors which are still in good condition. Hari asks Pranabendu to allow him to stay in the cinema hall one last time. Unable to bear the sight of his beloved cinema hall coming to a close, Pranabendu leaves for home. At home, he counsels Prakash to mend his ways if he wishes to make his soon-to-be-born child proud and avoid getting arrested by the police. All of a sudden, police arrives in their home. They inform Pranabendu that Hari has committed suicide inside the hall by hanging himself from a ceiling fan. Pranabendu rushes to the hall to retrieve Hari's hanging body. Prakash accompanies Hari's dead body to the crematorium. Once everybody had left, Pranabendu locks himself up in his beloved cinema hall and burns it down, thus also killing himself

== Thematic Representations in the Film ==
The film addresses contemporary issues within the Indian cinema industry, particularly focusing on the impact of piracy, copyright infringement, and theft. It highlights how the proliferation of the internet has led to widespread intellectual property theft, often without the perpetrators recognizing their actions as criminal. The film also emphasizes the lack of proper compensation for artists whose work is distributed without acknowledgment or remuneration by illegal streaming and download sites.

A central character, Pranabendu Bose, exemplifies the struggle against modern technology's adverse effects on the film industry. Pranabendu, deeply passionate about cinema, faces a generational divide with his son, Prakash, who engages in the sale of pirated movie CDs. This conflict leads to a severe estrangement between father and son, even though they reside under the same roof.

The film also portrays the decline of traditional cinema venues, as seen in Pranabendu's cinema hall, Kamalini, which falls into disuse due to the decreased patronage of big-screen movies. In a dramatic act of despair and defiance, Pranabendu ultimately sets fire to the cinema hall, choosing to perish with it as a means to preserve the integrity of cinema.

== Cast ==
- Paran Bandopadhyay as Pranabendu Das
- Arun Guhathakurta as Hari
- Parambrata Chattopadhyay as Prakash
- Sohini Sarkar as Moumita
- Lama as Ashim
- Bimal Chakraborty as Akhil
- Aloknanda Roy as Kamalini
- Debaloy Bhattacharya as Sudhanshu

== Awards ==
- IFFI ICFT UNESCO Gandhi Medal at the 46th IFFI
- 'FCCI Special Mention Award' at HBFF-2016, "for directing the spotlight on the grave crisis engulfing the celluloid art with the inevitable march of technology."

== Awards and nominations ==
Award	Category	Recipient(s)	Result
2nd Filmfare Awards East	Filmfare Award for Best Film - Bengali	Cinemawala	Won
2nd Filmfare Awards East	Filmfare Award for Best Director - Bengali	Kaushik Ganguly	Won
2nd Filmfare Awards East	Filmfare Award for Best Actor - Bengali	Paran Bandopadhyay	Nominated
2nd Filmfare Awards East	Filmfare Award for Best Actor (Critics) - Bengali	Paran Bandopadhyay	Won
2nd Filmfare Awards East	Filmfare Award for Best Supporting Actor - Bengali	Arun Guha Thakurta	Nominated
2nd Filmfare Awards East	Filmfare Award for Best Supporting Actor - Bengali	Parambrata Chatterjee	Nominated
2nd Filmfare Awards East	Filmfare Award for Best Dialogue - Bengali	Kaushik Ganguly	Nominated
2nd Filmfare Awards East	Filmfare Award for Best Screenplay - Bengali	Kaushik Ganguly	Nominated
2nd Filmfare Awards East	Filmfare Award for Best Editing - Bengali	Subhajit Singha	Nominated
2nd Filmfare Awards East	Filmfare Award for Best Background Score - Bengali	Indraadip Das Gupta	Nominated
2nd Filmfare Awards East	Filmfare Award for Best Story - Bengali	Kaushik Ganguly	Won
2nd Filmfare Awards East	Filmfare Award for Best Cinematography - Bengali	Soumik Haldar	Nominated
2nd Filmfare Awards East	Filmfare Award for Best Production Design - Bengali	Dhananjay Mandal	Won
2nd Filmfare Awards East	Filmfare Award for Best Sound Design - Bengali	Anirban Sengupta	Nominated

== See also ==
- Film Critics Circle of India
- International Film Festival of India
- Hyderabad Bengali Film Festival
- BRICS Film Festival
