= Shah Jahan Regency =

2019 Indian Bengali film directed by Srijit Mukherji

- Theatrical poster
- Directed by: Srijit Mukherji
- Written by: Srijit Mukherji
- Screenplay by: Srijit Mukherjee
- Based on: Chowringhee by Mani Shankar Mukherjee
- Starring: Abir Chatterjee; Anjan Dutt; Mamata Shankar; Parambrata Chatterjee; Rudranil Ghosh; Anirban Bhattacharya; Swastika Mukherjee; Kanchan Mullick; Rittika Sen; Rituparna Sengupta; Babul Supriyo
- Cinematography: Gairik Sarkar
- Edited by: Pronoy Dasgupta
- Music by: Indraadip Das Gupta
- Production company: SVF Entertainment Matchcut Productions Pvt.Ltd.
- Distributed by: SVF Entertainment
- Release date: 18 January 2019
- Country: India
- Language: Bengali

Shah Jahan Regency is an Indian Bengali drama film directed by Srijit Mukherji, under the banner of SVF Entertainment Pvt Ltd, starring Abir Chatterjee, Parambrata Chatterjee, Anjan Dutt, Mamata Shankar, Anirban Bhattacharya, Swastika Mukherjee, Rudranil Ghosh and Rittika Sen while Rituparna Sengupta and Babul Supriyo appear in Guest appearances. The movie, based on the popular novel Chowringhee by Mani Shankar Mukherjee, was released on 18 January 2019.

== Plot ==
The movie is based on the well-known novel Chowringhee by popular Bengali author Mani Shankar Mukherjee (Sankar). The 1968 film Chowringhee is an iconic Bengali film, based on the namesake novel, and starring Supriya Devi, Uttam Kumar, Subhendu Chatterjee, Anjana Bhowmik, Utpal Dutt and Biswajit.

== Cast ==
- Abir Chatterjee as Samiran Bose
- Anjan Dutt as Makaranda Paul, owner of Shah Jahan Regency
- Mamata Shankar as Mrs Sarkar, mother of Arnab Sarkar
- Rudranil Ghosh as Barun Raha
- Parambrata Chatterjee as Rudra Mukherjee
- Anirban Bhattacharya as Arnab Sarkar
- Swastika Mukherjee as Kamalini Guha, a Suite Hostess and escort of Mr. Agarwal
- Rittika Sen as Supreeta Mitra, an airhostess
- Rituparna Sengupta as Gayatri Chakraborti, in a Guest appearance
- Babul Supriyo as Mr. Agarwal, a rich businessman in a Guest appearance
- Kanchan Mullick as Dhananjoy 'Dheno' Chatterjee, maternal uncle of Arnab Sarkar
- Pallavi Chatterjee as Mrs. Mala Paul
- Sujoy Prosad Chatterjee as Nitya Banerjee aka Nitty-gritty
- Ushasie Chakraborty as Disha

== Release ==
The official trailer of the film was launched by SVF on 20 December 2018.

== Soundtrack ==
Shah Jahan Regency

Soundtrack album by Anupam Roy and Prasen
- Released: 2 March 2019
- Genre: Featured Film Soundtrack
- Length: 34:38
- Language: Bengali
- Label: SVF

Anupam Roy chronology
Debi (2018)	Shah Jahan Regency (2019)	Konttho (2019)

The soundtrack was composed by Anupam Roy and Prasen on lyrics of Anupam Roy, Dipangshu Acharya and Ritam Sen.

Track list
No.	Title	Lyrics	Music	Singer(s)	Length
1.	"Kichchu Chaini Aami"	Dipangshu Acharya	Prasen (Prasenjit Mukherjee)	Anirban Bhattacharya	6:49
2.	"Ghure Takao"	Anupam Roy	Anupam Roy	Anupam Roy	3:44
3.	"Bolo Na Radhika"	Ritam sen	Prasen (Prasenjit Mukherjee)	Monali Thakur	4:33
4.	"Rondhre Rondhre Paap"	Anupam Roy	Anupam Roy	Anupam Roy	5:38
5.	"Jawkhon Porbena Mor"	Rabindranath Tagore	Rabindranath Tagore	Rupankar Bagchi	7:42
6.	"Kichchu Chaini Aami (Female)"	Dipangshu Acharya	Prasen (Prasenjit Mukherjee)	Madhubanti Bagchi	6:17
Total length:					34:38
