= Dwitiyo Purush =

Studio album by Anupam Roy
- Released: 2013
- Studio: Sonic Solution
- Genre: Rock
- Length: 41:09
- Language: Bengali
- Label: V Music

Dwitiyo Purush (দ্বিতীয় পুরুষ) is the second solo album by Indian singer-songwriter Anupam Roy.

Phanka Frame, Ekbar Bol & Ami Ajkal Bhalo Achhi were later featured in Srijit Mukherji's film Jaatishwar, Baishe Srabon & Zulfiqar respectively. The verse of "Aaro Sheet" was changed a bit and was used as "Ei Srabon" in Baishe Srabon by Srijit Mukherji.

== Track listing ==
All songs sung, composed and written by Anupam Roy.

No.	Title	Length
1.	"Aamar Motey"	3:43
2.	"Aami Ajkal Bhalo Achhi"	4:55
3.	"Aaro Sheet"	3:59
4.	"Adbhut Mugdhata"	5:26
5.	"Anker Khata"	3:38
6.	"Ekbar Bol (Acoustic Version)"	4:31
7.	"Phanka Frame"	5:45
8.	"Raat Poshak"	3:55
9.	"Tarar Moto"	5:17
10.	"Antarborty Sunnyota (Instrumental)"
Total length:		41:09

== Personnel ==
- Anupam Roy - Singer-songwriter
- Sandipan Parial – Drums, Cajon, Shakers
- Nabarun Bose – Keyboards, Programming and Backing Vocals
- Roheet Mukherjee – Bass Guitar
- Subhodip Banerjee – Acoustic & Electric Guitars
- Shomi Chatterjee - Sound Engineer

== Release history ==
It was released on 14 February 2013.
