= Drishtikone =

- Theatrical release poster
- Bengali: দৃষ্টিকোন
- Directed by: Kaushik Ganguly
- Screenplay by: Kaushik Ganguly
- Story by: Kaushik Ganguly
- Produced by: Nispal Singh
- Starring: Kaushik Sen; Prosenjit Chatterjee; Rituparna Sengupta; Kaushik Ganguly
- Cinematography: Gopi Bhagat
- Edited by: Subhajit Singha
- Music by: Anupam Roy
- Production company: Surinder Films
- Distributed by: Surinder Films
- Release date: 27 April 2018 (India)
- Country: India
- Language: Bengali

Drishtikone (Bengali: দৃষ্টিকোন, English: Perspective) is a 2018 Bengali thriller film written and directed by Kaushik Ganguly, starring Prosenjit Chatterjee, and Rituparna Sengupta in lead roles. Despite receiving mixed reviews from critics and audience alike, the film turned out to be a "superhit" at the box office.

== Plot ==
Jion Mitra (Prosenjit Chatterjee) leads a simple life with his wife Rumki (Churni Ganguly) until he gets confronted with a case involving the murder of Srimoti's (Rituparna Sengupta) husband Polash (Kaushik Sen) who was accidentally killed by his elder brother Pritom (Kaushik Ganguly) and for that, he feels guilty but he is innocent which was later discovered by Jion's tactics and intellect. The story is tailored by the very experienced writer Kaushik Ganguly, it is a matter of maturity and skill to be framed as Jion and Srimoti as well as Rumki who are the main cast in this movie. They all are married, professional, experienced, and larger-than-life characters. Jion got the eye donated by Polash Sen, this issue worked in Srimoti's mind so, she wanted to have a relationship with Jion because she madly loved her husband. She found some events to be connected with Jion-Rumki's family. Also, Jion cared about her as his client, but Srimoti took permission to be connected from them as a family friend. The director started the thriller game from this phase in which Pritom Sen had a hidden relationship with his nurse played by Dolon Roy, that opened up to Jion's junior staff Ovik played by Soham Majumdar. The story rises with a new pace at this. The Mitra family with Ovik and Srimoti visited Puri-Jagannath where Rumki saw Srimoti getting closer to Jion. Her doubt was not wrong, Srimoti had no control over her emotions and opened up romantically to Jion, he was not interested in breaking his peaceful life with Rumki, but became a support to Sri also. We saw a loving space was growing in Jion's mind. Rumki stayed different from him, trying to take time on it over. Now after coming back Rumki and Jion got into a hot discussion about Srimoti, like a typical housewife she wanted to protect her husband for her, also for her kids and family status, but Jion did not admit anything. Rumki met Sri in her office to settle the matter. Jion's other face came strongly in front of the audience, on his case: to solve it he took help from the Police IG. They planned to confront Pritom Sen because Jion was confirmed that Polash was murdered by a group of human Organ Raketting criminals, Jion wanted to know Pritom's involvement in it. The climax was surprising! It came out that Polash was involved with the Criminals, in an exciting situation the brothers had a hot conflict and Polash was hit by Pritom and died on the spot. Then the other helping staff advised them to ride in the car to leave the town urgently. On the way to Bolpur, the driver kept the car on the busy highway and vanished. The upcoming truck pushed heavily the car and it got an accidental make-up and Pritom got rid of the problem by taking a false paralysed lifestyle. The story has an interesting mood after this. A sudden electric cut-out happened and Pritom got over the rooftop and attempted suicide. It just broke everything in Srimoti's life. After all the excitement ended, she requested Jion to go back to his family life and promised not to meet again. Sri also opened the truth that she loved him for the eye-sight of Polash was with Jion, not him personally. This fact broke down Jion deeply. He came back home, and Rumki was waiting for him on the balcony. A new and happy journey started again.

== Cast ==
- Prasenjit Chatterjee as Jion Mitra
- Rituparna Sengupta as Srimoti Sen
- Kaushik Ganguly as Pritam Sen
- Churni Ganguly as Rumki Mitra
- Kaushik Sen as Palash Sen
- Dolon Roy as Nurse
- Soham Majumdar as Avik
- Bharat Kaul as DCP Rajib Routh

== Soundtrack ==
Track listing
No.	Title	Singer(s)	Length
1.	"Lokkhiti"	Paloma Majumder	2:45
2.	"Lokkhiti (Male Version)"	Anupam Roy	3:50
3.	"Keu Keu Jane"	Rupankar Bagchi	4:43
4.	"Amar Dukkhogulo"	Anupam Roy	3:28
5.	"Amar Dukkhogulo (Female Version)"	Iman Chakraborty	4:55
