= List of Indian Bengali films of 2022 =

This is a list of Indian Bengali language films that were released in 2022.

== Box office collection ==
The following is the list of highest-grossing Bengali cinema films released in 2022. The rank of the films in the following table depends on the estimate of worldwide collections as reported by organizations classified as green by Wikipedia. (Note: See WP:RSP, WP:ICTFSOURCES) There is no official tracking of domestic box office figures within India.

Rank (Note: Sorted based on the lowest value when figures are presented as a range, and for the same value, the older item is given a higher order.)	Title	Production company	Distributor	Worldwide gross	Ref.
1	Projapoti	Bengal Talkies; Dev Entertainment Ventures	SSR Cinemas	₹13−14 crore	
2	Karnasubarner Guptodhon	SVF		₹9.8 crore	
3	Ballabhpurer Roopkotha	SVF		₹4.5 crore	
4	Belashuru	Windows Production		₹4.38 crore	
5	Aparajito	Friends Communication	SSR Cinemas	₹2.94 crore	

== January – March ==
Opening		Title	Director	Cast	Production company	Ref.
J A N U A R Y	21	Swastik Sanket	Sayantan Ghosal	Nusrat Jahan, Gaurav Chakrabarty, Saswata Chatterjee & Rudranil Ghosh	Eskay Movies	
J A N U A R Y	26	8/12 Binay Badal Dinesh	Arun Roy	Kinjal Nanda, Arna Mukhopadhyay, Remo, Saswata Chatterjee	KSS Productions and Entertainment	
F E B R U A R Y	4	Baba Baby O	Aritra Mukherjee	Jisshu Sengupta, Solanki Roy, Bidipta Chakraborty	Windows Production	
F E B R U A R Y	4	Kakababur Protyaborton	Srijit Mukherji	Prosenjit Chatterjee, Aryann Bhowmik, Anirban Chakrabarti	Shree Venkatesh Films	
F E B R U A R Y	18	Abar Bochhor Koori Pore	Srimanta Senguptta	Abir Chatterjee, Rudranil Ghosh, Tanusree Chakraborty, Arpita Chatterjee	PSS Entertainments & Pramod Films	
M A R C H	4	60 Er Pore	Souvik Dey	Amyth Sethi, Joy Sengupta, Rupanjana Mitra	M.S Films	
M A R C H	11	Aparajita: An Unspoken Relationship	Rohan Sen	Shantilal Mukherjee, Tuhina Das, Amrita De, Rana Basu Thakur	Kichukhan Entertainment	
M A R C H	11	Aami O Apu	Suman Maitra	Ananda S. Choudhuri, Prakriti Pujari, Partha Mukhopadhya, Amrita Halder	Chirosqro Films	

== April – June ==
Opening		Title	Director	Cast	Production company	Ref.
A P R I L	1	Abbar Kanchanjangha	Raajhorshee De	Arpita Chatterjee, Kaushik Sen, Gaurav Chakrabarty, Rahul, Padmanabha Dasgupta, Saswata Chatterjee, Bidipta Chakraborty, Tanusree Chakraborty, Debosree Ganguly	Patel Universal Works Studio	
A P R I L	8	Mahananda	Arindam Sil	Gargi Roychowdury, Debshankar Haldar, Ishaa Saha, Arno Mukhopadhyay	Friends Communication	
A P R I L	14	The Eken	Joydip Mukherjee	Anirban Chakrabarti, Payel Sarkar, Somak Ghosh, Suhatro Mukhopadhyay	Shree Venkatesh Films	
A P R I L	14	Abhijaan	Parambrata Chatterjee	Jisshu Sengupta, Rudranil Ghosh, Soumitra Chatterjee, Parambrata Chatterjee	Roadshow Films	
A P R I L	29	Kishmish	Rahool Mukherjee	Dev, Rukmini Maitra	Dev Entertainment Ventures	
A P R I L	29	Raavan	MN Raj	Jeet, Shataf Figar, Lahoma Bhattacharya, Tanusree Chakraborty	Jeetz Filmworks	
M A Y	6	Mini	Mainak Bhaumik	Mimi Chakraborty, Ayanna Chatterjee	Small Taalk Ideas	
M A Y	6	Kolkatar Harry	Rajdeep Ghosh	Soham Chakraborty, Priyanka Sarkar, Oishika Guhathakurata	Soham's Entertainment	
M A Y	13	Aparajito	Anik Dutta	Jeetu Kamal, Saayoni Ghosh	Friends Communication	
M A Y	13	Hridpindo	Shiladitya Moulik	Arpita Chatterjee, Saheb Chatterjee	KSS Productions	
M A Y	20	Belashuru	Nandita Roy, Shiboprosad Mukherjee	Soumitra Chatterjee, Swatilekha Sengupta, Rituparna Sengupta, Aparajita Auddy, Kharaj Mukherjee, Shankar Chakraborty, Indrani Dutta, Monami Ghosh	Windows Production	
M A Y	27	Tirandaj Shabor	Arindam Sil	Saswata Chatterjee, Subhrajit Dutta, Nigel Akkara	Camellia Productions	
M A Y	27	Bhoy Peona	Ayan Dey	Srabanti Chatterjee, Om Sahani	Big Screen Productions	
J U N E	3	X=Prem	Srijit Mukherji	Shruti Das, Anindya Sengupta, Arjun Chakrabarty, Madhurima Basak	Shree Venkatesh Films	
J U N E	3	Habji Gabji	Raj Chakraborty	Subhashree Ganguly, Parambrata Chatterjee, Samontak Dyuti Maitra, Osh Mallick	Raj Chakraborty Entertainment	
J U N E	10	Cheene Badam	Sheiladitya Moulik	Ena Saha, Yash Dasgupta	Jarek Entertainment	
J U N E	10	Mrityupathojatri	Soumya Sengupta	Rahul Banerjee	KSS Productions	
J U N E	10	Prapti	Anuraag Pati	Samadarshi Dutta, Devdut Ghosh, Pratyusha Roslin, Ananya Pal Bhattacharya	Prantika Productions	
J U N E	10	Tritiyo Purush	Raaj Mukherjee	Soumitra Chatterjee, Manoj Mitra, Dipankar De, Sreelekha Mitra, Dolon Roy	U D Entertainment	
J U N E	10	Panchabhuj	Rana Banerjee	Abhishek Chatterjee, Soma Banerjee, Koneenica Banerjee		
J U N E	17	Aay Khuku Aay	Sauvik Kundu	Prosenjit Chatterjee, Ditipriya Roy	Jeetz Filmworks	
J U N E	17	Jaalbandi	Pijush Saha	Prince Prachurya, Payel Sarkar, Darshana Banik	Prince Entertainment P4	
J U N E	17	Iskabon	Mandip Saha	Sourav Das, Anamika Chakraborty, Sanju Sk	SMD Entertainment	
J U N E	24	Jhorapalok	Sayantan Mukherjee	Bratya Basu, Jaya Ahsan, Kaushik Sen	Ava Films	
J U N E	24	Rishi	Preetam Mukherjee	Sourav Das, Darshana Banik, Chandrayee Ghosh, Rumki Chatterjee	Thinktank Entertainment	
J U N E	24	Haluaman	Abhimanyu Mukherjee	Soumyadipta Saha, Udita Munshi, Bilash Dey, Soham Chakraborty, Mimi Dutta, Paran Bandopadhyay	Artage and Pandemonium Productions	

== July – September ==
Opening		Title	Director	Cast	Production company	Ref.
J U L Y	8	Shrimati	Arjunn Dutta	Swastika Mukherjee, Soham Chakraborty	KSS Productions	
J U L Y	8	Pratham Barer Pratham Dekha	Aakash Malakar	Arya Dasgupta, Rittika Sen	SB Films & Entertainment	
J U L Y	15	Kuler Achaar	Sudeep Das	Madhumita Sarcar, Vikram Chatterjee, Indrani Haldar, Sujan Mukhopadhyay	Shree Venkatesh Films	
J U L Y	15	Ananta	Abhinandan Dutta	Ritwick Chakraborty, Sohini Sarkar	Roll Camera Action	
J U L Y	22	Achena Uttam	Atanu Bose	Saswata Chatterjee, Rituparna Sengupta, Srabanti Chatterjee, Ditipriya Roy	Alaknanda Arts, Shank Entertainment	
J U L Y	22	Draupadi The Horror Night	Narugopal Mandal, Sukumar Das	Rittika Sen, Mustaq Khan, Narugopal Mandal, Biswajit Chakraborty	N.R. Production	
J U L Y	22	Sahobashe	Anjan Kanjilal	Ishaa Saha, Anubhav Kanjilal	Mojotale Entertainments	
J U L Y	29	Antarjaal	Prarjun Majumder	Bonny Sengupta, Koushani Mukherjee	Pandey Motion Pictures	
J U L Y	29	Kulpi	Barshali Chatterjee	Payel Sarkar, Rajatava Dutta, Chumki Chowdhury, Protyay Ghosh	BD Film Production	
A U G U S T	5	Akash Ongshoto Meghla	Joydip Mukherjee	Rudranil Ghosh, Rahul Banerjee, Basabdatta Chatterjee, Ankita Chakraborty	Handwoven Films	
A U G U S T	11	Dharmajuddha	Raj Chakraborty	Swatilekha Sengupta, Subhashree Ganguly, Ritwick Chakraborty, Soham Chakraborty, Parno Mittra	Raj Chakraborty Entertainment	
A U G U S T	11	Bhotbhoti	Tathagata Mukherjee	Rishav Basu, Bibriti Chatterjee, Debolina Dutta, Rajatava Dutta, Anirban Chakrabarti, Dipankar De, Mamata Shankar, Tathagata Mukherjee	Pramod Films, PSS Entertainment	
A U G U S T	11	Byomkesh Hotyamancha	Arindam Sil	Abir Chatterjee, Sohini Sarkar, Suhatro Mukhopadhyay, Paoli Dam, Arno Mukhopadhyay, Kinjal Nanda, Anusha Viswanathan	Shree Venkatesh Films, Camellia Productions	
A U G U S T	19	Bismillah	Indraadip Dasgupta	Riddhi Sen, Subhashree Ganguly, Kaushik Ganguly, Bidipta Chakraborty, Aparajita Auddy, Gaurav Chakrabarty, Surangana Bandyopadhyay	Kaleidoscope Entertainment	
A U G U S T	19	Kalkokkho	Rajdeep Paul, Sarmistha Maiti	Tannistha Biswas, Janardan Ghosh, Sreelekha Mukherji, Amit Saha, Ahana Karmakar, Deep Sarkar	Aurora Film Corporation	
A U G U S T	25	Kolkata Chalantika	Pavel	Sourav Das, Ishaa Saha, Rajatava Dutta, Kharaj Mukherjee, Anirban Chakrabarti, Aparajita Auddy, Anamika Saha, Ditipriya Roy, Satabdi Chakraborty, Kiran Dutta	Baba Bhootnath Entertainment	
A U G U S T	26	Lokkhi Chele	Kaushik Ganguly	Ujaan Ganguly, Ritwika Pal, Purab Seal Acharya, Indrasish Roy, Pradip Bhattacharya, Ambarish Bhattacharya, Churni Ganguly	Windows Production	
S E P T E M B E R	2	Paka Dekha	Premendu Bikash Chaki	Soham Chakraborty, Susmita Chatterjee	Soham's Entertainment	
S E P T E M B E R	2	Shimanto	Suman Maitra	Saheb Bhattacharya, Payel Sarkar, Ranajay Bishnu	SSR Cinemas, Chirosqro Films	
S E P T E M B E R	16	Ajker Shortcut	Subir Mondal	Parambrata Chatterjee, Gaurav Chakrabarty, Apu Biswas, Nachiketa Chakraborty	Karmondal	
S E P T E M B E R	30	Kacher Manush	Pathikrit Basu	Dev, Prosenjit Chatterjee, Ishaa Saha	Dev Entertainment Ventures	
S E P T E M B E R	30	Karnasubarner Guptodhon	Dhrubo Banerjee	Abir Chatterjee, Arjun Chakrabarty, Ishaa Saha, Sourav Das	Shree Venkatesh Films	
S E P T E M B E R	30	Boudi Canteen	Parambrata Chatterjee	Subhashree Ganguly, Soham Chakraborty, Anashua Majumdar, Parambrata Chatterjee	Roadshow Films, Shadow Films	
S E P T E M B E R	30	Mission Everest	Debaditya Bandopadhyay	Chandrayee Ghosh	Camellia Productions	

== October – December ==
Opening		Title	Director	Cast	Production company	Ref.
O C T O B E R	14	Bijoya Dashami	Souvik Dey	Rajatava Dutta, Aryann Bhowmick	Drishti Entertainment	
O C T O B E R	14	Agantuk	Indraadip Dasgupta	Abir Chatterjee, Sohini Sarkar	ZEE5	
O C T O B E R	21	Ballabhpurer Roopkotha	Anirban Bhattacharya	Satyam Bhattacharya, Debraj Bhattacharya, Surangana Bandyopadhyay	Shree Venkatesh Films	
O C T O B E R	21	Hirokgorer Hire	Sayantan Ghosal	Bonny Sengupta, Soham Chakraborty, Koushani Mukherjee	ZEE5	
O C T O B E R	21	Jotugriho	Saptaswa Basu	Bonny Sengupta, Parambrata Chatterjee, Payel Sarkar	Nexgen Ventures	
N O V E M B E R	4	Amrapali	Raja Chanda	Ayoshi Talukdar, Bonny Sengupta, Anirban Chakrabarti	ZEE5	
N O V E M B E R	11	Jhilli	Ishaan Ghosh	Aranya Gupta, Bitan Biswas, Sombhunath De, Sayandeep Guha, Sourav Nayak	Shree Venkatesh Films	
N O V E M B E R	11	Dostojee	Prasun Chatterjee	Arif Shaikh, Asif Shaikh	Kathak Talkies	
N O V E M B E R	11	Savings Account	Raja Chanda	Ankush Hazra, Sayantika Banerjee	ZEE5	
N O V E M B E R	18	Ogo Bideshini	Anshuman Pratyush	Ankush Hazra, Alexandra Talyor, Rajnandini Paul	Eskay Movies	
N O V E M B E R	18	Kothamrito	Jiit Chakraborty	Kaushik Ganguly, Aparajita Auddy	Jalan Productions	
N O V E M B E R	25	Prosenjit Weds Rituparna	Samrat Sharma	Ipsita Mukherjee, Risav Basu, Prosenjit Chatterjee, Rituparna Sengupta	Onelife Studios Pvt Ltd	
N O V E M B E R	25	Toke Chhara Banchbo Na	Sujit Mondal	Yash Dasgupta, Priyanka Sarkar	Surinder Films	
N O V E M B E R	25	Haar Mana Haar	Raja Chanda	Ayoshi Talukdar, Soham Chakraborty, Payel Sarkar, Sudipta Chakraborty, Silvia Dey	ZEE5	
N O V E M B E R	25	Clown	Rick Chatterjee	Om Sahani, Devlina Kumar		
D E C E M B E R	2	Khela Jawkhon	Arindam Sil	Mimi Chakraborty, Arjun Chakrabarty, Susmita Chatterjee	SVF, Camellia Productions	
D E C E M B E R	2	Subho Bijoya	Rohan Sen	Kaushik Ganguly, Bonny Sengupta, Koushani Mukherjee, Kharaj Mukherjee, Churni Ganguly	Kichukhan Entertainment	
D E C E M B E R	23	Projapati	Avijit Sen	Dev, Mithun Chakraborty, Mamata Shankar, Shweta Bhattacharya	Dev Entertainment Ventures & Bengal Talkies	
D E C E M B E R	23	Hatyapuri	Sandip Ray	Indraneil Sengupta, Abhijit Guha, Ayush Das	Ghosal Media and Entertainment, Shadow Films	
D E C E M B E R	23	Haami 2	Shiboprosad Mukherjee & Nandita Roy	Gargi Roychowdhury, Shiboprosad Mukherjee	Windows Production	
D E C E M B E R	30	Uttwaran	Indraadip Dasgupta	Ankush Hazra, Kaushik Ganguly, Saayoni Ghosh, Rwitobroto Mukherjee	Sunday Entertainment, ZEE 5	
