= 6th WBFJA Awards =

Indian film awards

2022-2023 WBFJA Awards
- Awarded for: Excellence in Indian Bengali cinema
- Announced on: Nominations: 5 January 2023
- Presented on: 8 January 2023
- Date: 8 January 2023
- Organised by: West Bengal Film Journalists’ Association (WBFJA)
- Official website: WBFJA

Highlights
- Best Film: Dostojee; Aparajito
- Best Direction: Anik Dutta
- Best Actor: Dev; Ritwick Chakraborty
- Best Actress: Gargi Roychowdhury

The 6th edition of the WBFJA Award, also known as Cinemar Samabartan (Convocation of Cinema or Carnival of Films) took place on 8 January 2023. It honoured the best Indian Bengali films of 2022.

== Superlatives ==
Multiple wins
Awards	Film
8	Aparajito
6	X=Prem
5	Ballabhpurer Roopkotha; Dostojee
4	Projapoti

== Winners and Nominees ==
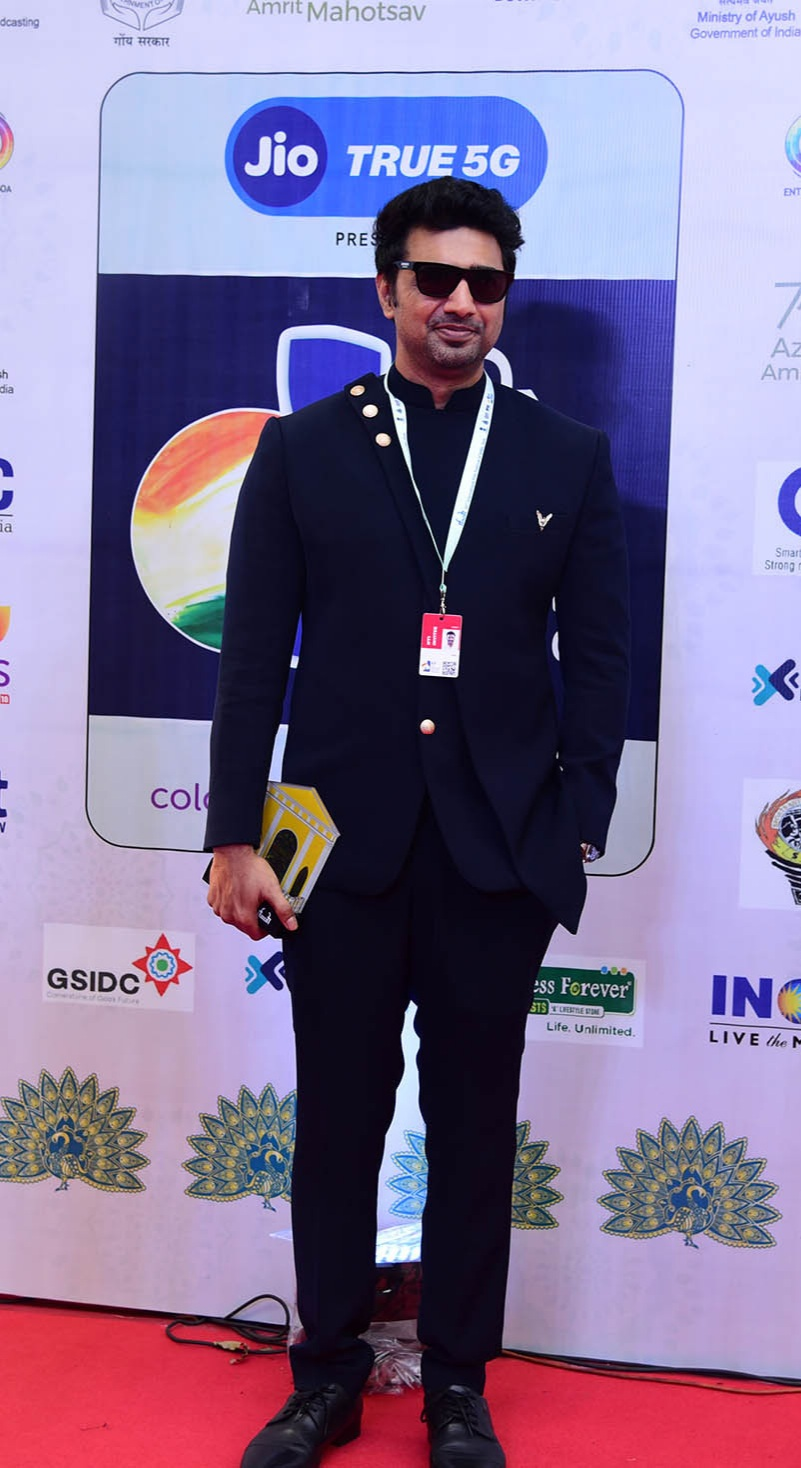
Dev, Best Actor co-winner

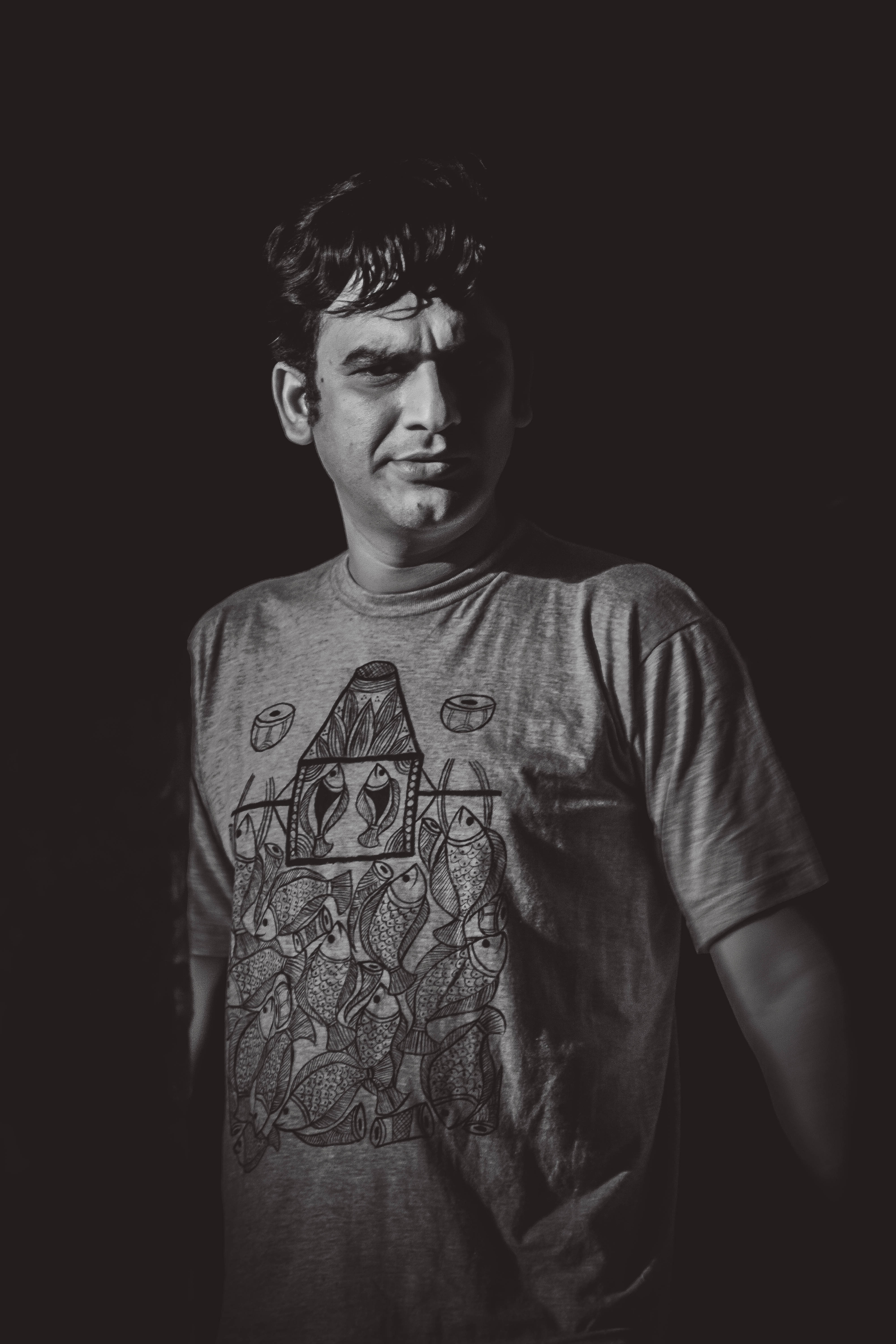
Ritwick Chakraborty, Best Actor co-winner

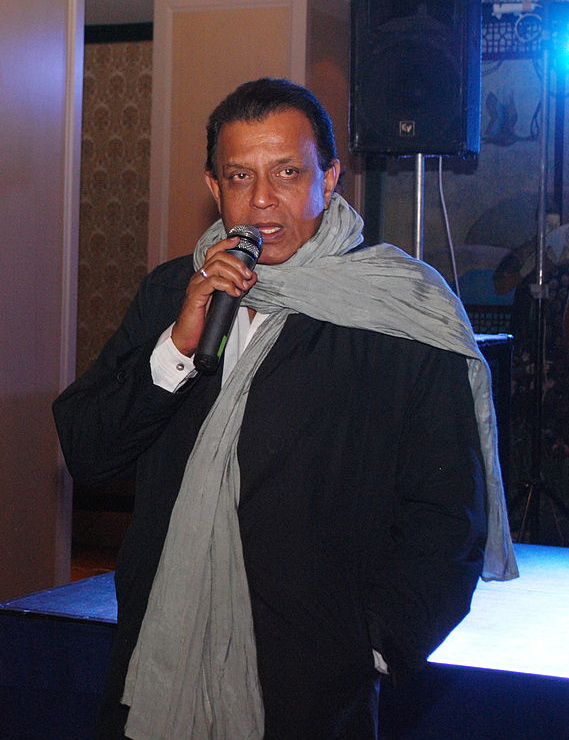
Mithun Chakraborty, Best Actor Popular

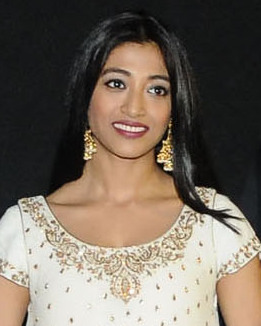
Paoli Dam, Best Supporting Actress

=== Jury Awards ===
Best Film	Best Director
Aparajito – Friends Communication; Dostojee – Katha Talkies; The Holy Conspiracy – Walzen Media Works Private Limited; Ballabhpurer Roopkotha – Shree Venkatesh Films; Jhilli – Goutam Ghose Associates; Lokkhi Chele – Windows Production	Anik Dutta – Aparajito; Dhrubo Banerjee – Karnasubarner Guptodhon; Kaushik Ganguly – Lokkhi Chele; Parambrata Chatterjee – Abhijaan; Raj Chakraborty – Habji Gabji; Srijit Mukherji – X=Prem
Best Actor	Best Actress
Dev – Projapoti as Joy Chakraborty; Ritwick Chakraborty – Ananta: The Eternal as Mr. Shuvo; Arjun Chakraborty – X=Prem as Arnab; Bratya Basu – Jhora Palok as Jibanananda Das; Parambrata Chatterjee – Habji Gabji as Aditya Basu; Riddhi Sen – Bismillah as Bismillah a.k.a. Bishu	Gargi Roy Chowdhury – Mahananda as Mahananda Bhattacharya; Arpita Chatterjee – Hridpindo as Aarja; Sohini Sarkar – Ananta: The Eternal as Ms. Mishtu; Subhashree Ganguly – Boudi Canteen as Poulami; Swastika Mukherjee – Shrimati as Shrimati
Best Supporting Actor	Best Supporting Actress
Shyamal Chakraborty – Ballabhpurer Roopkotha as Manohar; Ambarish Bhattacharya – Lokkhi Chele as Joy Mitra; Kharaj Mukherjee – Kishmish as Govinda Chatterjee (Goblu); Prantik Banerjee – Hridpindo as Rick; Rudranil Ghosh – Abhijaan as Rabi Ghosh	Paoli Dam – Byomkesh Hatyamancha as Sulachana; Anashua Majumdar – Boudi Canteen as Poulami's mother-in-law; Anjana Basu – Kishmish as Pubali Chatterjee; Sneha Chatterjee – Bismillah as Safeena; Tanusree Chakraborty – Abar Kanchanjungha as Ruchira
Best Actor in a Negative Role	Best Actor in a Comic Role
Chandan Sen – Tirandaj Shabor as Pareshnath Chakraborty; Anirban Chakrabarti – Kakababur Protyaborton as Amal Dey; Gaurav Chakrabarty – Bismillah as Shibu; Indrasish Roy – Lokkhi Chele as Rajat Ray; Rahul Banerjee – Abar Kanchanjungha as Devesh	Debraj Bhattacharya – Ballabhpurer Roopkotha as Sanjiv Basu; Kharaj Mukherjee – Projapoti as Gaur Chakraborty's neighbour; Rajatava Dutta – Karnasubarner Guptodhon as Dashanan Daw; Rudranil Ghosh – Abar Bochhor Koori Pore as Dutta; Sandip Bhattacharya – Ballabhpurer Roopkotha as B. P. Haldar
Debut Awards
Most Promising Actor	Most Promising Actress
Jeetu Kamal – Aparajito as Aparajito Roy; Anindya Sengupta – X=Prem as Khilaat; Arif Shaikh – Dostojee as Safiqul; Samontak Dyuti Maitra – Habji Gabji as Anish Basu / Tipu; Satyam Bhattacharya – Ballabhpurer Roopkotha as Bhoopati / Raghupati / Ramapati; Ujaan Ganguly – Lokkhi Chele as Aamir Hussain	Shruti Das – X=Prem as Joyee; Ipsita Mukherjee – Prosenjit Weds Rituparna as Rituparna; Solanki Roy – Baba Baby O as Brishti Roy; Surangana Bandopadhyay – Ballabhpurer Roopkotha as Chanda Haldar
Most Promising Director
Anirban Bhattacharya – Ballabhpurer Roopkotha; Prasun Chatterjee – Dostojee; Abhinandan Dutta – Ananta: The Eternal; Avijit Sen – Projapoti; Ishaan Ghose – Jhilli; Kumar Chowdhury – Priyo Chinar Pata: Iti Segun; Rahool Mukherjee – Kishmish; Rajdeep Paul and Sarmistha Maiti – Kalkokkho; Sayantan Mukherjee – Jhora Palok; Srimanta Sengupta – Abar Bochhor Koori Pore

=== Popular Choice Awards ===
Most Popular Film	Most Popular Actor
Karnasubarner Guptodhon – Shree Venkatesh Films; Projapoti – Dev Entertainment Ventures; Ballabhpurer Roopkotha – Shree Venkatesh Films; Belashuru – Windows Production; Hatyapuri – Shadow Films	Mithun Chakraborty – Projapoti as Gaur Chakraborty; Abir Chatterjee – Karnasubarner Guptodhon as Subarna Sen / Sona Da; Dev – Kishmish as Tintin Chatterjee; Jeet – Raavan as Professor Ram Mukherjee / Raavan; Prosenjit Chatterjee – Kakababur Protyaborton as Kakababu

=== Music Awards ===
Best Music Director	Best Lyricist
Saptak Sanai Das – X=Prem; Anindya Chatterjee and Anupam Roy – Belashuru; Amit-Ishan – Baba Baby O; Indraadip Dasgupta – Bismillah; Nilayan Chatterjee – Kishmish	Baarish – Bhalobashar Morshum" – X=Prem; Nilayan Chatterjee – "Kanna" – Kishmish; Anupam Roy – "Sohage Adore" – Belashuru; Dhrubojyoti Chakraborty – "Roder Nishana" – X=Prem; Anirban Bhattacharya – "Sajo Sajao" – Ballabhpurer Roopkotha; Ranajoy Bhattacharjee - "Bandhu" – Abar Bochhor Koori Pore
Best Male Playback SInger	Best Female Playback Singer
Arijit Singh – "Bhalobashar Morshum" – X=Prem; Saptak Sanai Das – "Cindrella Mon" – X=Prem; Anupam Roy – "Sohage Adore" – Belashuru; Arijit Singh – "Abosheshe" – Kishmish; Papon – "Kanna" – Kishmish; Sonu Nigam – "Mukti" – Kacher Manush	Shreya Ghoshal – "Bhalobashar Morshum" – X=Prem; Iman Chakraborty, Ananya Bhattacharjee & Upali Chattopadhyay – "Tapa Tini" – Belashuru; Mekhla Dasgupta – "Mon Kemoner Janmodin" – Hridpindo; Sahana Bajpaie – "Saja Sajao" – Ballabhpurer Roopkotha

=== Technical Awards ===
Best Screenplay	Best Editing	Best Art Director	Best Cinematography
Saibal Mitra – A Holy Conspiracy; Anirban Bhattacharya and Pratik Dutta – Ballabhpurer Roopkotha; Anik Dutta, Sreeparna Mitra and Utsav Mukherjee – Aparajito; Kaushik Ganguly – Lokkhi Chele; Srijit Mukherjee – X=Prem; Padmanabha Dasgupta, Dr. Subhendu Sen and Parambrata Chatterjee – Abhijaan; Arindam Sil and Subhendu Dasmunshi – Mahananda	Sanglap Bhowmik – Ballabhpurer Roopkotha; Arghyakamal Mitra – Aparajito; Sanglap Bhowmik – X=Prem; Md. Kalam – Habji Gabji; Sujay Dutta Ray – Bismillah	Ananda Addhya – Aparajito; Subrata Barik – Ballabhpurer Roopkotha; Nafisa Khatun – Karnasubarner Guptodhon; Ranjit Gharai – Bismillah	Ishaan Ghose – Jhilli; Tuhin Biswas – Jhilli; Supratim Bhol – Aparajito; Subhankar Bhar – Bismillah; Modhura Palit – Kachher Manush; Avijit Nandy – Jhra Palok; Soumik Halder – Ballabhpurer Roopkotha
Best Sound Designer	Best Background Score	Best Costume Designer	Best Makeup
Prasun Chatterjee and Rohit Sengupta – Dostojee; Anindit Roy and Adeep Singh Manki – Ballabhpurer Roopkotha; Tirthankar Majumder – Aparajito; Aneesh Basu – Jhilli; Sukanto Majumdar – Jhra Palok; Shomi Chatterjee – Abhijaan	Debojyoti Mishra – Aparajito; Indraadip Dasgupta – X=Prem; Bickram Ghosh – Karnasubarner Guptodhon; Subhadeep Guha – Ballabhpurer Roopkotha	Suchismita Dasgupta – Aparajito; Abhishek Roy – Bismillah; Sabarni Das – Mahananda; Poulami Gupta – Abar Bochhor Koori Pore; Sanchita Bhattacharjee – Ballabhpurer Roopkotha	Somnath Kundu – Ballabhpurer Roopkotha; Barun Kumar Mondal – Abhijaan; Avirup Ganguly – Lokkhi Chele; Arun Kumar Mondal and Bithika Benia – Kishmish

== See also ==
- West Bengal Film Journalists' Association Awards
- Cinema of West Bengal
