= 6th Filmfare Awards Bangla =

2023 awards for Bengali cinema

- Date: 10 March 2023
- Site: ITC Royal Bengal, Kolkata
- Hosted by: Anirban Bhattacharya; Ankush Hazra; Srabanti Chatterjee
- Official website: Filmfare Awards Bangla

Highlights
- Best Film: Ballabhpurer Roopkotha; Dostojee
- Best Critic: Abhijaan; A Holy Conspiracy
- Most awards: Ballabhpurer Roopkotha (5)
- Most nominations: Bismillah (12)

Television coverage
- Network: Zee Bangla

The 6th Filmfare Awards Bangla ceremony, presented by The Times Group, honor the best Bengali language Indian films of 2021–2022. The ceremony was held on 10 March 2023 at the ITC Royal Bengal in Kolkata. Ballabhpurer Roopkotha and Dostojee shared the award for Best Film. The Award Show was aired on 2 April 2023 on Zee Bangla. The ceremony was hosted by Anirban Bhattacharya, Srabanti Chatterjee and Ankush Hazra.

== Superlatives ==
Multiple nominations
Nominations	Film
12	Bismillah
11	Ballabhpurer Roopkotha
10	Karnasubarner Guptodhon
10	Boudi Canteen
9	Abhijaan
8	X=Prem
8	Dostojee
7	Aparajito
7	Priyo Chinar Pata: Iti Segun
7	Projapoti
4	Aay Khuku Aay
4	Jhilli
3	A Holy Conspiracy
3	Mahananda
3	Shrimati
2	Kacher Manush
2	Sahobashe

Multiple wins
Awards	Film
5	Ballabhpurer Roopkotha
4	Dostojee
3	Bismillah
3	Priyo Chinar Pata: Iti Segun
2	Projapoti
2	Aparajito
2	X=Prem
2	Abhijaan
2	Mahananda
2	Jhilli

== Winners and nominees ==
=== Popular awards ===
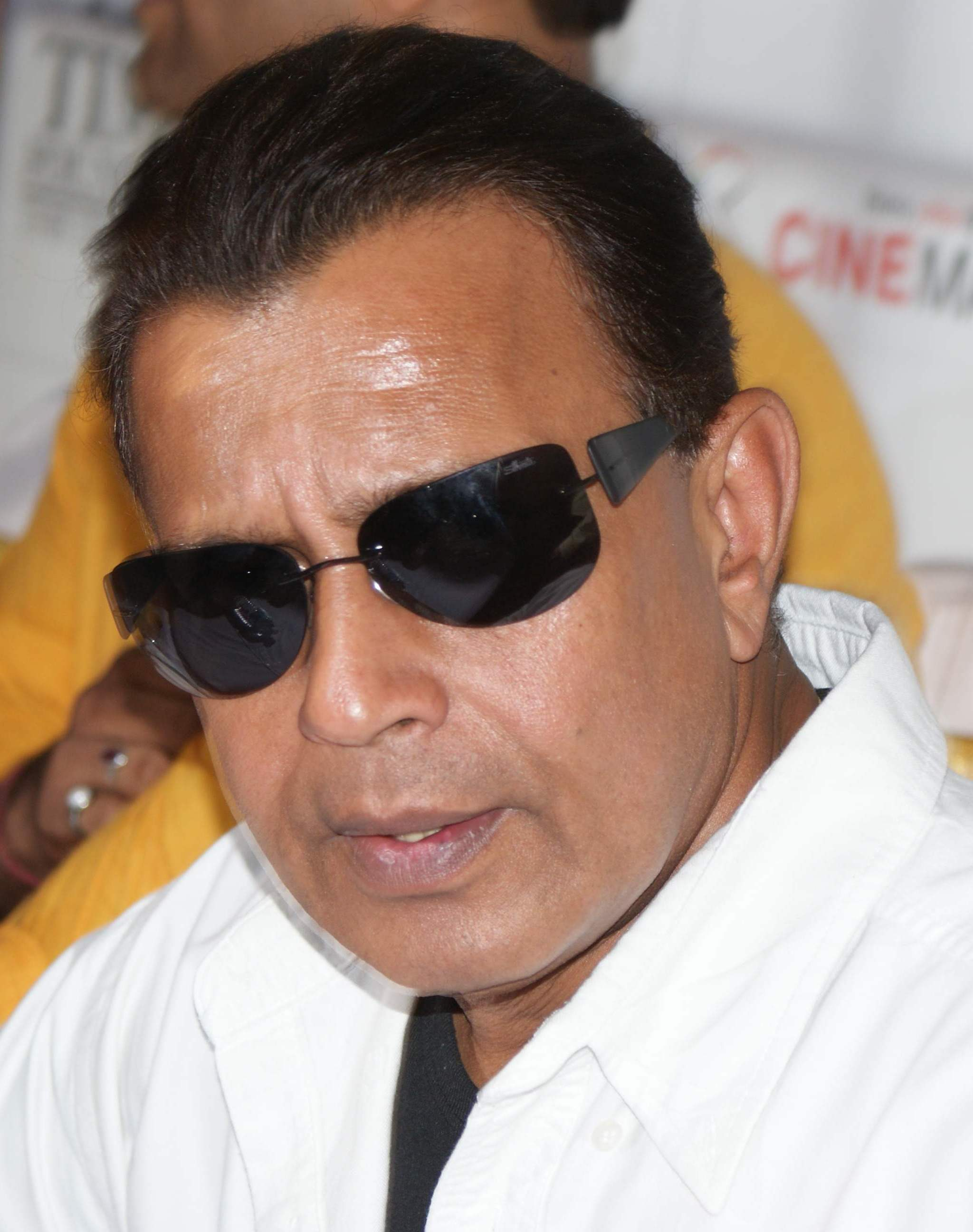
Mithun Chakraborty – Best Actor winner for Projapoti

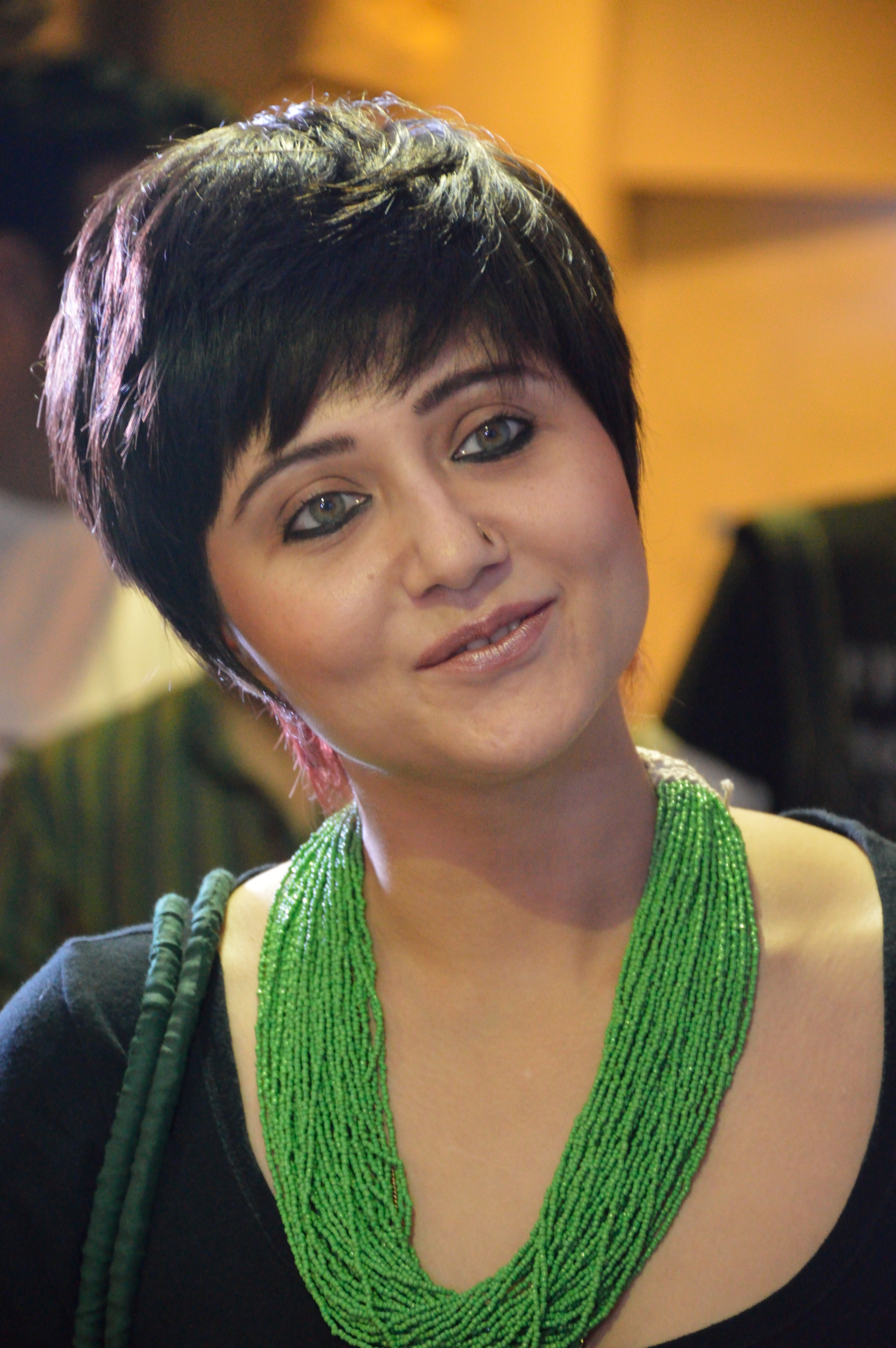
Swastika Mukherjee – Best Actress winner for Shrimati

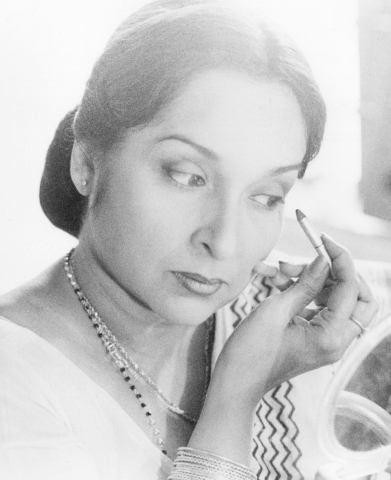
Mamata Shankar – Best Supporting Actress winner for Projapoti

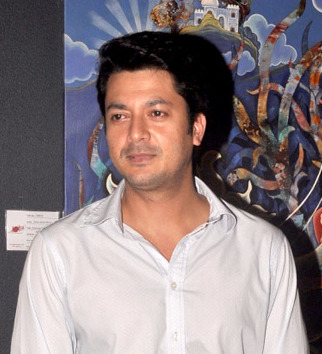
Jisshu Sengupta – Best Actor Critics winner for Abhijaan

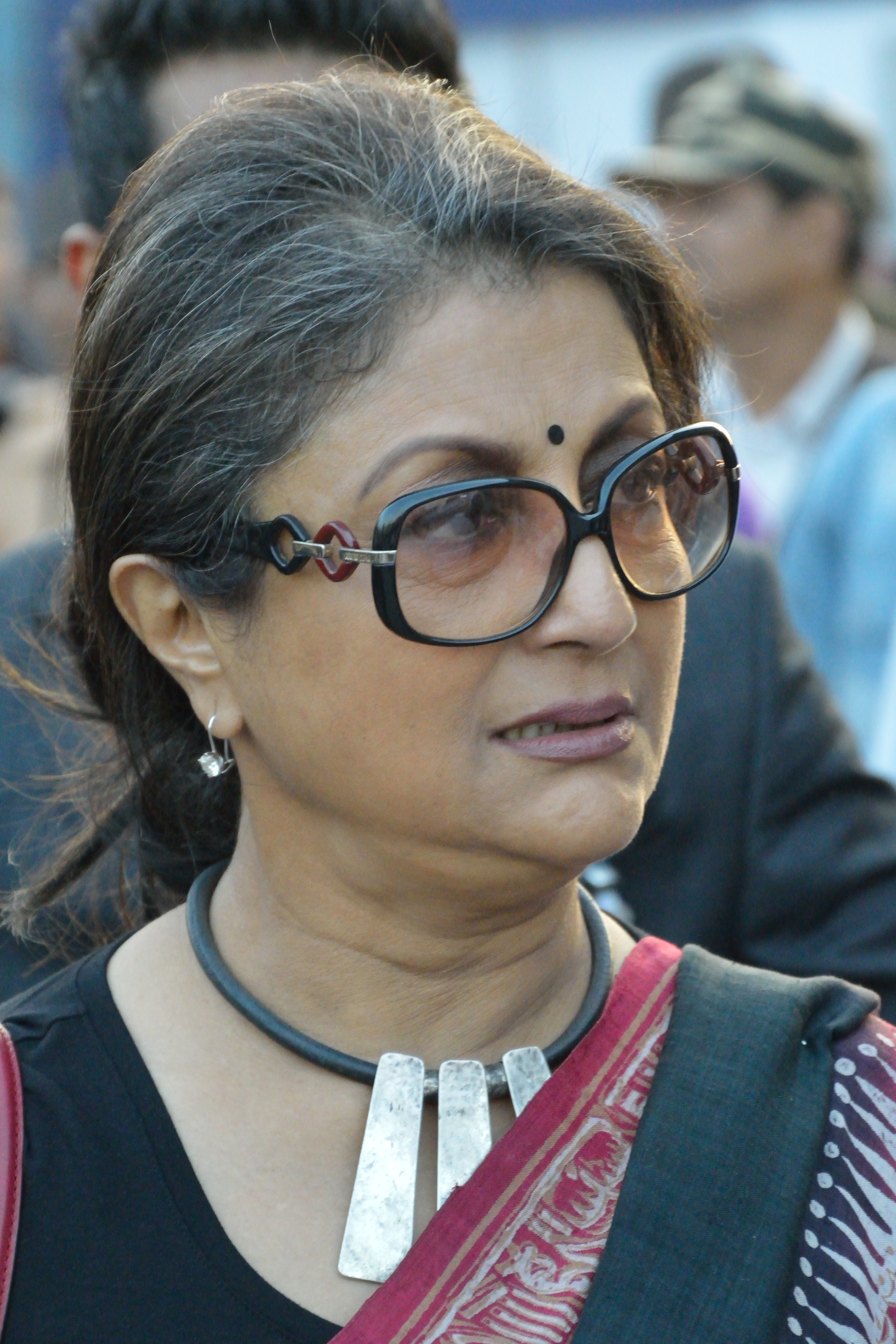
Aparna Sen – Lifetime Achievement Awardee

Best Film		Best Director
Dostojee – Kathak Talkies; Ballabhpurer Roopkotha – Shree Venkatesh Films; Abhijaan – Roadshow Films, Ratnashree Nirman; Aparajito – Friends Communication; Boudi Canteen – Roadshow Films; Karnasubarner Guptodhon – Shree Venkatesh Films; Projapoti – Dev Entertainment Ventures		Prasun Chatterjee – Dostojee; Anik Datta – Aparajito; Anirban Bhattacharya – Ballabhpurer Roopkotha; Avijit Sen – Projapoti; Dhrubo Banerjee – Karnasubarner Guptodhon; Parambrata Chatterjee – Abhijaan; Parambrata Chatterjee – Boudi Canteen
Best Actor		Best Actress
Mithun Chakraborty – Projapoti as Gaur Chakraborty; Abir Chatterjee – Karnasubarner Guptodhon as Subarna Sen / Sona Da; Dev – Kacher Manush as Kuntal Sarkar; Indraneil Sengupta – Hatyapuri as Feluda; Jisshu Sengupta – Abhijaan as Soumitra Chatterjee; Prosenjit Chatterjee – Aay Khuku Aay as Nirmal Mondal / Himself; Soumitra Chatterjee – Abhijaan as Himself		Swastika Mukherjee – Shrimati as Shrimati; Ditipriya Roy – Aay Khuku Aay as Satabdi Mondal / Buri; Gargi Roychowdhury – Mahananda as Mahananda Bhattacharya; Ishaa Saha – Sahobashe as Teesta / Tushi; Rukmini Maitra – Kishmish as Rohini Sen; Subhashree Ganguly – Boudi Canteen as Poulami Chatterjee
Best Supporting Actor		Best Supporting Actress
Shyamal Chakraborty – Ballabhpurer Roopkotha as Manohar; Arjun Chakrabarty – X=Prem as Arnab; Kaushik Ganguly – Bismillah as Rasheed Ali; Kharaj Mukherjee – Kishmish as Govinda Chatterjee; Parambrata Chatterjee – Abhijaan as Dr. Sanjay Sen; Sraman Chattopadhay – The Holy Conspiracy as Kunal Joseph Baske		Mamata Shankar – Projapoti as Kusum Sen; Amrita Chattopadyay – The Holy Conspiracy as Reshmi Merry Maal; Anashua Majumdar – Boudi Canteen as Shurbhi Chatterjee; Bidipta Chakraborty – Abar Kanchanjungha as Rini Dev; Jayati Chakraborty – Dostojee as Palash's Mother; Parno Mitra – Dharmajuddho as Shabnam / Shabana
Debut Awards
Best Male Debut	Best Female Debut	Best Debut Director
Anindya Sengupta – X=Prem as Khilat	Shruti Das – X=Prem as Joyee; Piyali Samanta – Priyo Chinar Pata: Iti Segun as Segun	Ishaan Ghose – Jhilli; Kumar Chowdhury – Priyo Chinar Pata: Iti Segun; Joydeep Mukherjee – Akash Ongshoto Meghla; Anirban Bhattacharya – Ballabhpurer Roopkotha; Prasun Chatterjee – Dostojee; Rajdeep Paul & Sarmistha Maiti – Kalkokkho
Music Awards
Best Music Director		Best Lyricist
Indraadip Dasgupta – Bismillah; Anupam Roy, Surojit Chatterjee & Rathijit – Projapoti; Joy Sarkar – Boudi Canteen; Nilayan Chatterjee – Kishmish; Saptak Sanai Das – X=Prem; Soumya Rit – Sahobashe		Anirban Bhattacharya – "Notun Premer Gaan" – Ballabhpurer Roopkotha; Anindya Chatterjee & Ranajoy Bhattacharjee – "Aay Khuku Aay" – Aay Khuku Aay; Barish – "Bhalobashar Morshum" – X=Prem; Ritam Sen – "Tomake Dekhini" – Bismillah; Soumya Rit – "Shon Shon" – Shrimati; Srijato – "Aajkey Raatey" – Bismillah
Best Playback Singer – Male		Best Playback Singer – Female
Arijit Singh – "Aajkey Raatey" – Bismillah; Debraj Bhattacharya – "Notun Premer Gaan" – Ballabhpurer Roopkotha; Arijit Singh – "Bhalobashar Morshum" – X=Prem; Arijit Singh – "Oboseshe" – Kishmish; Dev Arijit – "Tujh Sang Bandhi Dor" – Dharmajuddho; Ranajoy Bhattacharjee – "Aay Khuku Aay" – Aay Khuku Aay; Sonu Nigam – "Mukti Dao" – Kacher Manush		Kaushiki Chakraborty – "Keno Rong Dile Mohey" – Bismillah; Nikhita Gandhi – "Janina Bhalolaga" – Kishmish; Sahana Bajpaie – "Shajo Shajao" – Ballabhpurer Roopkotha; Shreya Ghosal – "Bhalobashar Morshum" – X=Prem; Shreya Ghoshal – "Keno Je Tomakey" – Bismillah; Somlata Acharyya Chowdhury – "Shon Shon" – Shrimati

=== Critics' awards ===
Best Film (Best Director)
Abhijaan; A Holy Conspiracy
Best Actor	Best Actress
Jisshu Sengupta (Abhijaan)	Gargi Roychowdhury (Mahananda); Subhashree Ganguly (Boudi Canteen)

=== Technical awards ===
Best Story	Best Screenplay
Kumar Chowdhury (Priyo Chinar Pata: Iti Segun); Aritra Sen (Boudi Canteen); Avijit Sen and Atanu Raychaudhuri (Projapoti); Dhrubo Banerjee (Karnasubarner Guptodhon); Prasun Chatterjee (Dostojee)	Prasun Chatterjee (Dostojee); Dhrubo Banerjee and Sougata Basu (Karnasubarner Guptodhon); Kumar Chowdhury (Priyo Chinar Pata: Iti Segun); Parambrata Chatterjee, Padmanabha Dasgupta, Dr. Shubhendu Sen (Abhijaan); Sayantan Mukherjee (Jhora Palok)
Best Dialogue	Best Editing
Prateek Dutta And Anirban Bhattacharya (Ballabhpurer Roopkotha); Dhrubo Banerjee and Sougata Basu (Karnasubarner Guptodhon); Parambrata Chatterjee, Padmanabha Dasgupta And Dr. Shubhendu Sen (Abhijaan); Samragnee Banerjee (Boudi Canteen); Srijit Mukherji (X=Prem); Subhadeep Das (Projapoti)	Arghyakamal Mitra (Aparajito); Ishaan Ghose (Jhilli); Sanglap Bhowmik (Karnasubarner Guptodhon); Sujay Datta Ray (Bismillah); Sujay Datta Ray and Santanu Mukherjee (Dostojee); Sumit Chowdhury (Boudi Canteen)
Best Background Score	Best Cinematography
Bickram Ghosh (Mahananda); Bickram Ghosh (Karnasubarner Guptodhon); Debojyoti Mishra (Aparajito); Indraadip Dasgupta (Bismillah); Megh Banerjee (Priyo Chinar Pata: Iti Segun)	Ishaan Ghose (Jhilli); Tuhin Biswas (Dostojee); Prosenjit Koley (Priyo Chinar Pata: Iti Segun); Soumik Haldar (Ballabhpurer Roopkotha); Soumik Haldar (Karnasubarner Guptodhon); Subhankar Bhar (Bismillah); Supratim Bhol (Aparajito)
Best Production Design	Best Sound Design
Subrata Barik (Ballabhpurer Roopkotha); Ananda Addhya (Aparajito); Nafisa Khatun (Karnasubarner Guptodhon); Ranajit Gharai ( Bismillah); Rwiddharwita Khan (Boudi Canteen)	Tirthankar Majumdar (Aparajito); Aneesh Basu (Jhilli); Adeep Singh Manki And Anindit Roy (Ballabhpurer Roopkotha); Prasun Chatterjee And Rohit Sengupta (Dostojee); Subhadeep Mitra (Bismillah); Sujay Das (Priyo Chinar Pata: Iti Segun)

=== Special awards ===
Lifetime Achievement Award
- Aparna Sen
