= Filmfare Award Bangla for Best Supporting Actress =

Indian film award

- Awarded for: Best Performance by an Actress in a Supporting Role
- Country: India
- Presented by: Filmfare
- First award: Moushumi Chatterjee, Goynar Baksho (2014)
- Currently held by: Tanika Basu; Chaalchitro, Monami Ghosh; Padatik
- Website: Filmfare Awards Bangla

The Filmfare Award Bangla for Best Supporting Actress is presented annually at the Filmfare Awards Bangla to an actress based on a jury decision. It is given for Bengali films by Filmfare, a film magazine.

== Superlatives ==
Superlative	Actress	Record
Most awards	Aparajita Auddy; Mamata Shankar	2
Most nominations	Aparajita Auddy; Mamata Shankar	3
Most nominations without ever winning	Swastika Mukherjee	2
Oldest winner	Lily Chakravarty (2021)	80
Oldest nominee	Lily Chakravarty (2021)	80
Youngest winner	Tanika Basu (2025)	
Youngest nominee	Shajbati (2017)	–

=== Most Wins ===
Winner	Number of wins	Years
Aparajita Auddy	2	2017, 2022
Mamata Shankar	2	2018, 2023
Lily Chakravarty	1	2021
Moushumi Chatterjee	1	2014
Jaya Ahsan	1	2024

== Winners & Nominees ==
Table key
‡	Indicates the winner
†	Indicates a posthumous winner

=== 2010s ===
Year	Photos of winners	Actress	Role(s)	Film
2014 (1st)		Moushumi Chatterjee ‡	Rashmoni Pishima	Goynar Baksho
2014 (1st)		Locket Chatterjee	Sujata	Nayika Sangbad
2014 (1st)		Sreelekha Mitra	Jhumur A. Gupta	Ashchorjyo Prodeep
2014 (1st)		Raima Sen	Ishaani	Maach Mishti & More
2014 (1st)		Swastika Mukherjee	Reena	Maach Mishti & More
2015	NO CEREMONY			
2016	NO CEREMONY			
2017 (2nd)		Aparajita Auddy ‡	Malini 'Molly' Mukherjee	Praktan
2017 (2nd)		Churni Ganguly	Antara	Bastu-Shaap
2017 (2nd)		Mamata Shankar	Swati Dutta	Antarleen
2017 (2nd)		Shajbati	Rupsa Chaudhury	Shankhachil
2017 (2nd)		Sudipta Chakraborty	Ms. Bonhi	Shororipu
2018 (3rd)		Mamata Shankar ‡	Dev D's Mother	Maacher Jhol
2018 (3rd)		Arjaa Bannerjee	Chandra Chatterjee	Dhananjay
2018 (3rd)		Lily Chakravarty	Gauri Lahiri	Posto
2018 (3rd)		Sneha Biswas	Mother	Sahaj Paather Gappo
2018 (3rd)		Tanusree Chakraborty	Manashi S. Basak	Durga Sohay

=== 2020s ===
Year	Photos of winners	Actress	Role(s)	Film
2021 (4th)		Lily Chakravarty ‡	Sulekha Mitra	Sanjhbati
2021 (4th)		Aparajita Ghosh Das	Annada	Rajlokhi O Srikanto
2021 (4th)		Daminee Benny Basu	Parul Ganguly	Jyeshthoputro
2021 (4th)		Sauraseni Maitra	Ahiri	Finally Bhalobasha
2021 (4th)		Swastika Mukherjee	Dia K. Chatterjee	Kia and Cosmos
2022 (5th)		Aparajita Auddy ‡	Mishti Mukherjee	Cheeni
2022 (5th)		Alokananda Roy	Malini's Mother	Ekannoborti
2022 (5th)		Basabdatta Chatterjee	Mou	Tokhon Kuasa Chilo
2022 (5th)		Chandrayee Ghosh	Kaberi Bose	Mukhosh
2022 (5th)		Poulomi Basu	Shreemati Chatterjee	Dictionary
2022 (5th)		Tannishtha Biswas	Kusum Kumari Devi	Hiralal
2023 (6th)		Mamata Shankar ‡	Kusum Sen	Projapoti
2023 (6th)		Amrita Chatterjee	Reshmi Merry Maal	The Holy Conspiracy
2023 (6th)		Anashua Majumdar	Shurbhi Chatterjee	Boudi Canteen
2023 (6th)		Bidipta Chakraborty	Rini Dev	Abar Kanchanjungha
2023 (6th)		Jayati Chakraborty	Palash's Mother	Dostojee
2023 (6th)		Parno Mitra	Shabnam/Shabana	Dharmajuddha
2024 (7th)		Jaya Ahsan ‡	Meghna Mustafi	Ardhangini
2024 (7th)		Anashua Majumdar	Gauri Mukherjee	Raktabeej
2024 (7th)		Aparajita Auddy	Mishti Mukherjee	Cheeni 2
2024 (7th)		Mallika Mazumder	Mrs. Chatterjee	Niharika
2024 (7th)		Srabanti Chatterjee	Kaberi Bhattacharya	Kaberi Antardhan
2025 (8th)	— —	Tanika Basu ‡	Putul	Chaalchitro
2025 (8th)	— —	Monami Ghosh ‡	Geeta Sen	Padatik
2025 (8th)	— —	Ritabhari	Pori Ghoshal	Bohurupi
2025 (8th)	— —	Subhashree Ganguly	Adv. Indrani Sen	Shontaan
2025 (8th)	— —	Swastika Dutta	Swatilekha Sen	Alaap
2025 (8th)	— —	Swastika Mukherjee	Mrinmoyee 'Meenu' Mizanoor	Bijoyar Pore
