= West Bengal Film Journalists' Association Award for Best Director =

Indian film awards

WBFJA for Best Director
- Awarded for: Best direction by a director
- Country: India
- Presented by: West Bengal Film Journalists' Association
- First award: 2013
- Final award: 2026
- Most Recent Winner: Srijit Mukherjee for Shotyi Bole Shotyi Kichhu Nei

The West Bengal Film Journalists' Association Award for Best Director is given yearly by WBFJA as a part of its annual West Bengal Film Journalists' Association Awards for Bengali films. The award recognizes the best director for a film released over the previous year.

== Superlatives ==
Category	Name	Superlative
Most Awards	Kaushik Ganguly	3 awards
Most Nominations	Srijit Mukherji	7 nominations
Most Nominations without a Win	Arindam Sil	3 nominations

== List of winners ==
=== Winner Wise ===
Year	Winner	Film
2017	Kaushik Ganguly	Cinemawala
2018	Kaushik Ganguly	Bishorjon
2019	Srijit Mukherji	Ek Je Chhilo Raja
2020	Kaushik Ganguly	Nagarkirtan
2021	Anik Dutta	Borunbabur Bondhu
2022	Atanu Ghosh	Binisutoy
2023	Anik Dutta	Aparajito (2022 film)
2024	Atanu Ghosh	Shesh Pata
2025	Debaloy Bhattacharya	Shri Swapankumarer Badami Hyenar Kobole
2026	Srijit Mukherjee	Shotyi Bole Shotyi Kichhu Nei

=== Nomination Wise ===
- 2017 Kaushik Ganguly – Cinemawala
  - Goutam Ghose - Shankhachil
  - Kamaleshwar Mukherjee - Khawto
  - Shiboprosad Mukherjee, Nandita Roy - Praktan
  - Srijit Mukherji - Zulfiqar
- 2018 Kaushik Ganguly – Bishorjan
  - Atanu Ghosh - Mayurakshi
  - Pratim D. Gupta - Maacher Jhol
  - Anik Dutta - Meghnad Badh Rahasya
  - Mostofa Sarwar Farooki - Doob
  - Suman Mukhopadhyay - Asampta
  - Arindam Sil - Dhananjay
  - Buddhadeb Dasgupta - Tope
- 2019 Srijit Mukherji - Ek Je Chhilo Raja
  - Arnab Riingo Banerjee - Ray
  - Ranjan Ghosh - Rongberonger Korhi
  - Soukarya Ghosal - Rainbow Jelly
  - Indrasis Acharya - Pupa
  - Mainak Bhaumik - Generation Ami
  - Arindam Sil - Byomkesh Gotro
- 2020 Kaushik Ganguly – Nagarkirtan
  - Srijit Mukherji - Vinci Da
  - Aparna Sen - Ghawre Bairey Aaj
  - Buddhadeb Dasgupta - Urojahaj
  - Dhrubo Banerjee - Durgeshgorer Guptodhon
  - Churni Ganguly - Tarikh
- 2021 Anik Dutta - Barunbabur Bondhu
  - Srijit Mukherjee - Dwitiyo Purush
  - Sudeshna Roy & Abhijit Guha - Sraboner Dhara
  - Debaloy Bhattacharya - Dracula Sir
  - Mainak Bhaumik - Cheeni
- 2022 Atanu Ghosh - Binisutoy
  - Bratya Basu - Dictionary
  - Dhrubo Banerjee - Golondaaj
  - Saibal Mitra - Tokhon Kuasa Chilo
  - Kamaleshwar Mukherjee - Anusondhaan
- 2023 Anik Dutta - Aparajito
  - Dhrubo Banerjee - Karnasubarner Guptodhon
  - Kaushik Ganguly - Lokkhi Chele
  - Parambrata Chatterjee - Abhijaan
  - Raj Chakraborty - Habji Gabji
  - Srijit Mukherji - X=Prem
- 2024 Atanu Ghosh - Shesh Pata
  - Arindam Sil - Maayakumari
  - Indranil Roychowdhury - Mayar Jonjal
  - Kaushik Ganguly - Palan
- 2025 Debaloy Bhattacharya – Shri Swapankumarer Badami Hyenar Kobole
  - Srijit Mukherji – Padatik
  - Anjan Dutt – Chaalchitra Ekhon
  - Pratim D Gupta – Chaalchitro: The Frame Fatale
- 2026 Srijit Mukherji - Shotyi Bole Shotyi Kichhu Nei
  - Indraadip Dasgupta - Grihapravesh
  - Aniruddha Roy Chowdhury - Dear Maa
  - Arjunn Dutta - Deep Fridge
  - Aditya Vikram Sengupta - Mayanagar

== See also ==
- West Bengal Film Journalists' Association Awards
- Cinema of India
