= West Bengal Film Journalists' Association Award for Best Film =

Annual Indian film award

WBFJA for Best Film
- Awarded for: Best Bengali Film
- Country: India
- Presented by: West Bengal Film Journalists' Association
- Final award: 2026
- Most Recent Winner: Mayanagar

The West Bengal Film Journalists' Association Award for Best Film is given by WBFJA as a part of its annual West Bengal Film Journalists' Association Awards for Bengali films. It recognizes the best film released during the previous year.

== List of winners ==
Year	Film	Director	Producer	Studio	Ref.
2017	Cinemawala	Kaushik Ganguly	Shrikant Mohta, Mahendra Soni	SVF	
2017	Khawto	Kamaleshwar Mukherjee	Shrikant Mohta, Mahendra Soni	SVF	
2017	Peace Haven	Suman Ghosh	Arindam Ghosh	Arindam Ghosh Films	
2017	Shaheb Bibi Golaam	Pratim D. Gupta	Firdausul Hasan, Probal Haldar	Friends Communication	
2017	Shankhachil	Goutam Ghose.	Prasenjit Chatterjee, Faridur Reza Sagar, Mou Raychowdhury, Habibur Rahman Khan	Ashirbad Cholochitro, Impress Telefilm Limited, NIdeas Creations & Productions	
2018	Mayurakshi	Atanu Ghosh	Firdausul Hasan, Probal Haldar	Friends Communication	
2018	Bishorjan	Kaushik Ganguly		Opera Movies	
2018	Sahaj Paather Gappo	Manas Mukul Pal	Avijit Saha	Avijit Saha Production	
2018	Dhananjay	Arindam Sil	Shrikant Mohta, Mahendra Soni	SVF	
2018	Raktokorobi	Amitava Bhattacharya	Ashis Ghosh, Bhaskar Chakraborty, Rituparna Thakur	Three Wish Entertainment	
2018	Maacher Jhol	Pratim D. Gupta	Joy Ganguly	Sony Pictures Networks, Mojo Productions	
2018	Tope	Buddhadeb Dasgupta		AVA Film Productions	
2018	Doob	Mostofa Sarwar Farooki	Abdul Aziz, Irrfan Khan, Ashok Dhanuka, Himanshu Dhanuka	Jaaz Multimedia, Irrfan Khan Films, Eskay Movies	
2019	Pupa	Indrasis Acharya	Rajiv Mehra	Addatimes	
2019	Rongberonger Korhi	Ranjan Ghosh	Rupa Datta	Camellia Productions Pvt. Ltd	
2019	Rainbow Jelly	Soukarya Ghosal		Indigenous Productions	
2019	Ray		Bajrang Lal Agarwal	Winds of Autumn Motion Pictures	
2019	Generation Ami	Mainak Bhaumik	Shrikant Mohta, Mahendra Soni	SVF	
2019	Shonar Pahar	Parambrata Chattopadhyay	Shyamsundar Dey. Arijit Dutta	Greentouch Entertainment	
2020	Nagarkirtan	Kaushik Ganguly		Acropoliis Entertainment	
2020	Vinci Da	Srijit Mukherji	Shrikant Mohta, Mahendra Soni	SVF	
2020	Kedara	Indraadip Dasgupta	Samiran Das	Kaleidoscope	
2020	Ghare Baire aaj	Aparna Sen	Shrikant Mohta, Mahendra Soni	SVF	
2020	Urojahah	Buddhadeb Dasgupta			
2020	Tarikh	Churni Ganguly			
2021	Borunbabur Bondhu	Anik Dutta	Nispal Singh	Surinder Films	
2021	Dwitiyo Purush	Srijit Mukherjee	Shrikant Mohta, Mahendra Soni	SVF	
2021	Dracula Sir	Debaloy Bhattacharya	Shrikant Mohta, Mahendra Soni	SVF	
2021	Abyakto	Arjun Dutta	Tarun Das	Trina Films, Roop Production & Entertainment	
2021	Sraboner Dhara	Sudeshna Roy, Abhijit Guha	Pradip Churiwal	Macneil Engineering Ltd	
2022	Binisutoy	Atanu Ghosh	Sandeep Agarwal	Echo Entertainments	
2023	Aparajito	Anik Dutta	Firdausul Hasan, Probal Halder	Friends Communication	
2023	Dostojee	Prasun Chatterjee		Katha Talkies	
2023	The Holy Conspiracy	Shaibal Mitra	Joydeep Roy Chowdhury, Shubhra Sarthi Chakraborty	Walzen Media Works Private Limited	
2023	Ballabhpurer Roopkotha	Anirban Bhattacharya	Shrikant Mohta, Mahendra Soni	Shree Venkatesh Films	
2023	Jhilli	Ishaan Ghose	Goutam Ghose, Ishaan Ghose	Goutam Ghose Associates	
2023	Lokkhi Chele	Kaushik Ganguly	Nandita Roy, Shiboprosad Mukherjee	Windows Production	
2024	Shesh Pata	Atanu Ghosh	Firdausul Hasan, Probal Halder	Friends Communication	
2024	Ardhangini	Kaushik Ganguly	Nispal Singh	Surinder Films	
2024	Maayakumari	Arindam Sil		Camellia Productions	
2024	Mayar Jonjal	Indranil Roychowdhury	Josim Uddin Ahmed, Indranil Roychowdhury	Views and Visions, Indranil Roychowdhury Films	
2025	Manikbabur Megh	Abhinandan Banerjee	Bauddhayan Mukherji, Monalisa Mukherji	Little Lamb Films	
2025	Beline			DrishtiShree Arts Pvt. Limited	
2025	Chaalchitra Ekhon			Hoichoi Studios	
2025	Padatik	Srijit Mukherjee	Firdausul Hasan, Prabal Halder	Friends Communication	
2025	Shri Swapankumarer Badami Hyenar Kobole	Debaloy Bhattacharya		Hoichoi Studios	
2026	Mayanagar	Aditya Vikram Sengupta	Anshulika Dubey, Priyankar Agarwal, Shashwat Singh, Aditya Vikram Sengupta, Jonaki Bhattacharya, Priyankar Patra, Vikram Mohanta	For Films	
2026	Shotyi Bole Shotyi Kichhu Nei	Srijit Mukherji	Shrikant Mohta, Mahendra Soni	Shree Venkatesh Films	
2026	Grihapravesh	Indraadip Dasgupta	Sameeran Das	Kaleidoscope Entertainment	
2026	Dear Maa	Aniruddha Roy Chowdhury	Aniruddha Roy Chowdhury, Indrani Mukherjee, Aashish Singh, Pooja Singh, Sameerr Rao, Shillpa Kataria Singh	ABP Studios, Flying Colours Pictures, Opus Communications, Ace Of Spades Entertainment	
2026	Deep Fridge	Arjunn Dutta	Krishna Kyal	Colors of Dream Entertainment	
2026	Putulnacher Itikatha	Suman Mukherjee	Samiran Das	Kaleidoscope Entertainment	

== See also ==
- West Bengal Film Journalists' Association Awards
- Cinema of India
