= Aparajita (disambiguation) =

Aparajita was Shilahara ruler of north Konkan branch from 975 CE – 1010 CE.

Aparajita may also refer to:

- Durga, the Hindu goddess, also known as Aparajita meaning invincible
- Shiva and Vishnu, also known as Aaprajita
- Aparajita (Jain monk)
- Aparajita Mohanty, Indian actress in Odia cinema
- Aparajito (novel), novel by Indian writer Bibhutibhushan Bandyopadhyay, a sequel to Pather Panchali
  - Aparajito, its 1956 film adaptation by Satyajit Ray, a sequel to Pather Panchali and second in The Apu Trilogy
- Aparajito (2022 film), a 2022 Indian film about Satyajit Ray
- Aparajita: An Unspoken Relationship, a 2022 Indian Bengali-language film
