= Ballabhpurer Roopkotha =

2022 Indian Bengali film

- Ballabhpurer Roopkotha Official Poster
- বল্লভপুরের রূপকথা
- Directed by: Anirban Bhattacharya
- Screenplay by: Anirban Bhattacharya, Prateek Dutta
- Based on: Ballavpurer Roopkotha by Badal Sarkar
- Produced by: Shrikant Mohta; Mahendra Soni
- Starring: Satyam Bhattacharya; Shyamal Chakraborty; Surangana Bandyopadhyay; Debraj Bhattacharya; Sandip Bhattacharya; Jhulan Bhattacharya
- Cinematography: Soumik Haldar
- Edited by: Sanglap Bhowmik
- Music by: Debraj Bhattacharya, Subhadeep B Guha
- Production company: Shree Venkatesh Films
- Release date: 25 October 2022
- Country: India
- Language: Bengali
- Box office: ₹5 crore

Ballabhpurer Roopkotha is a 2022 Indian Bengali language supernatural comedy horror film directed by Anirban Bhattacharya in his feature directorial debut, based on the 1954 eponymous play by Badal Sarkar. It follows a debt-laden royal scion as he tries to pay off creditors by selling his ancestral palace, while trying to hide a potentially deal-breaking secret. The plot was originally inspired by the film The Ghost Goes West by René Clair. The film was released on 25 October 2022 under the banner of Shree Venkatesh Films. It received strongly positive reviews, and was a box office success.

== Plot ==
In 1961, Ray Bahadur Bhupati Ray, the King of Ballabhpur village, is deep in debt. His only material asset is his crumbling 400-year-old ancestral palace. Bhupati wants to move to Kolkata and start a dental clinic, and he tries to sell the palace to pay off his debts.

As a potential buyer, businessman Mr. Haldar, informs him that he will come over to take a look at the property, Bhupati and his faithful butler, Monohar, set about to give the house a new look. They seek help from three of Bhupati's local creditors, Saha, Srinath and Paban. Bhupati's college friend Sanjib suddenly arrives there and becomes a part of the act by playing the estate's dewan.

Mr Haldar arrives that night with his wife Sapna and daughter Chhandaa. Contrary to Bhupati's expectations, he is highly impressed by the historic heritage and the aristocratic flavour of the household. Haldar immediately signs him a cheque for the property. Chhandaa and Bhupati instantly feel attracted to each other. As the Haldars leave after dinner, Bhupati reveals a big secret to Sanjib, one that he has kept from the buyers - Every night after 11 pm, the ghost of Raghupati, Bhupati's ancestor wanders around the palace. He further reveals that Raghupati is trapped in the mansion because of a curse. Raghu Da, as he calls him, can only remove the curse by forcing his rivals, the descendants of the Bhuiyas (royals) of Ballabhpur's rival kingdom Pratapgarh, to surrender and apologize. Sanjib doesn't believe him but is frightened by Raghu's laughter ringing out as the clock strikes 11.

However, the Haldars return to the palace because their car breaks down on their way back. Bhupati and Sanjib panic while Monohar makes modest arrangements for their guests' night stay. Bhupati tries to calm Raghu, but the latter continues his manic laughter and starts reciting verses or Sanskrit shloks. Chhandaa is mesmerized by the recitation, especially after the womanising Raghu's ghost recites from Kalidas to her. But she mistakes him for Bhupati since both of them look identical. Sapna is furious to see 'Bhupati' flirting with her daughter late at night, and forces her husband to cancel the deal. When she has a go at Bhupati, he takes the blame. Then he confesses the truth to a confused Mr Haldar in private. Mr Halder is overjoyed to learn about the ghost and he proposes to quadruple the amount paid if Bhupati can prove the ghost's presence to his wife the next time. Sapna agrees to this. Chhandaa is offended by Bhupati's meekness in accepting blame when there was none. She further accuses him of being a coward.

The very next day, a new prospective buyer appears at the door. Mr Haldar barges in with his family and identifies the man as Mr Chowdhury, his school friend, competitor and fellow aficionado of heritage palaces. Mr Chowdhury ridicules both Mr Haldar and Bhupati regarding the history of the palace and ends up revealing himself as a descendant of the Pratapgarh royals. An excited Bhupati summons Raghu who arrives and threatens Mr Chowdhury with a sword. When his bullets prove no match for Raghu, Mr Chowdhury finally kneels down and begs forgiveness. Raghu is released from his curse and disappears. All the misunderstandings are settled. Sapna apologizes and proposes that Chhandaa and Bhupati marry, which they readily agree to. The film ends with the newly-married couple discussing life when they hear Raghu's voice again.

== Cast ==
- Satyam Bhattacharya as Bhupati / Raghupati / Ramapati: Raghupati's father
- Surangana Bandyopadhyay as Chhandaa
- Debraj Bhattacharya as Sanjib Basu, Bhupati's friend
- Shyamal Chakraborty as Manohar, Bhupati's butler
- Sandip Bhattacharya as B.P. Halder, Chhandaa's father
- Jhulan Bhattacharya as Swapna, Chhandaa's mother
- Kripabindu Chowdhury as Saha
- Sumanta Roy as Paban
- Surajit Sarkar as Srinath
- Shyamal Sarkar as Mr. Chowdhury
- Naren Bhattacharjee as Rashid, the Majhee (Boatman)
- Nitai as Bohurupi Balaai

== Music ==
List of Ballabhpurer Roopkotha's Music Track
No.	Name	Singer	Lyrics	Composer
1	Badal Sircar Er Gaan	Debraj Bhattacharya, Anirban Bhattacharya, Subhadeep Guha, Jijo	Anirban Bhattacharya	Debraj Bhattacharya
2	Shaajo Shaajao (Female)	Sahana Bajpaie	Anirban Bhattacharya	Debraj Bhattacharya
3	Shaajo Shaajao (Male)	Debraj Bhattacharya & Anirban Bhattacharya	Anirban Bhattacharya	Debraj Bhattacharya
4	Chaarsho Bochor Periye	Subhadeep Guha, Debraj Bhattacharya, Anirban Bhattacharya, Jijo	Anirban Bhattacharya	Debraj Bhattacharya
5	Notun Premer Gaan	Surangana Bandyopadhyay, Debraj Bhattacharya	Anirban Bhattacharya	Debraj Bhattacharya

== Reception ==
=== Box office ===
Ballabhpurer Roopkatha emerged as a financial success. The film is estimated to have made ₹5 crore at the box office.

=== Critical response ===
The film received strongly positive reviews, with multiple critics praising the film and highlighting its originality, the merging of humour, romance and horror, performances of the cast, direction and cinematography.

Abhinandan Dutta of the Anandabazar Patrika reviewed the film and wrote "The director has brought a fresh breath in the Bengali film industry with Ballabhpurer Roopkotha. Anirban has successfully played a masterstroke with new faces, thrilling screenplay and dialogues." He praised the performances of the whole cast, the cinematography, editing and the background score. Writing for The Telegraph, Shantanu Ray Chaudhuri called it "an important film as far as Bengali cinema is concerned, which is going through what is without a doubt its most barren phase in years, both creatively and commercially". The Citizen's Shoma A Chatterji called the film "perhaps the best thing to have happened to Bengali cinema in a long, long time", terming it the best Bengali film of 2022.

== Accolades ==
Year	Award	Category	Recipient(s)	Result	Ref.
2023	6th Filmfare Awards Bangla	Best Film	Shree Venkatesh Films	Won	
2023	6th Filmfare Awards Bangla	Best Director	Anirban Bhattacharya	Nominated	
2023	6th Filmfare Awards Bangla	Best Supporting Actor	Shyamal Chakraborty	Won	
2023	6th Filmfare Awards Bangla	Best Director Debut	Anirban Bhattacharya	Nominated	
2023	6th Filmfare Awards Bangla	Best Lyricist	Anirban Bhattacharya for "Notun Premer Gaan"	Won	
2023	6th Filmfare Awards Bangla	Best Playback Singer - Male	Debraj Bhattacharya for "Notun Premer Gaan"	Nominated	
2023	6th Filmfare Awards Bangla	Best Playback Singer - Female	Sahana Bajpaie for "Shajo Shajao"	Nominated	
2023	6th Filmfare Awards Bangla	Best Dialogue	Prateek Dutta And Anirban Bhattacharya	Nominated	
2023	6th Filmfare Awards Bangla	Best Cinematography	Soumik Haldar	Nominated	
2023	6th Filmfare Awards Bangla	Best Production Design	Subrata Barik	Won	
2023	6th Filmfare Awards Bangla	Best Sound Design	Adeep Singh Manki and Anindit Roy	Nominated	
2023	6th WBFJA Awards	Best Film	Shree Venkatesh Films	Nominated	
2023	6th WBFJA Awards	Best Supporting Actor	Shyamal Chakraborty	Won	
2023	6th WBFJA Awards	Best Actor in a Comic Role	Debraj Bhattacharya	Won	
2023	6th WBFJA Awards	Best Actor in a Comic Role	Sandip Bhattacharya	Nominated	
2023	6th WBFJA Awards	Most Promising Actor	Satyam Bhattacharya	Nominated	
2023	6th WBFJA Awards	Most Promising Actress	Surangana Bandyopadhyay	Nominated	
2023	6th WBFJA Awards	Most Promising Director	Anirban Bhattacharya	Won	
2023	6th WBFJA Awards	Best Editing	Sanglap Bhowmik	Won	
2023	6th WBFJA Awards	Most Popular Film	Shree Venkatesh Films	Nominated	
2023	6th WBFJA Awards	Best Background Score	Subhadeep Guha	Nominated	
Best Female Playback Singer	Sahana Bajpaie for "Shajo Shajao"	Nominated			
