= 3.11 A Sense of Home Films =

- Film poster
- Directed by: Catherine Cadou; Shunji Dodo; Víctor Erice; Pedro González-Rubio; Bong Joon Ho; Naomi Kawase; Leslie Kee; So Yong Kim (as So-yong Kim); Isaki Lacuesta; Jonas Mekas; Kaori Momoi; Takushi Nishinaka; Wisut Ponnimit; Mohd Naguib Razak; Ariel Rotter; Steven Sebring; Patti Smith; Kazuhiro Sōda; Apichatpong Weerasethakul; Toyoko Yamasaki; Jia Zhangke; Zhao Ye
- Produced by: Naomi Kawase
- Release dates: September 19, 2011; (Nara International Film Festival); October 8, 2011 (Yamagata International Documentary Film Festival); October 27-30, 2011 (Short Shorts Film Festival ＆ Asia 2011)
- Running time: 75 minutes
- Country: Japan

3.11 A Sense of Home Films is a 2011 anthology film. Following the 2011 Tōhoku earthquake and tsunami on March 11, 2011, Naomi Kawase, executive director of the Nara International Film Festival, contacted numerous directors and artists to create short films, each 3 minutes and 11 seconds in length, for a planned anthology.

== Short films ==
- "Future House", directed by Ariel Rotter
- "Despedida/Farewell", directed by Isaki Lacuesta
- "Monsoon", directed by Apichatpong Weerasethakul
- "Alone Together", directed by Jia Zhangke
- "La Dunette", directed by Catherine Cadou
- "Heartquake", directed by Kaori Momoi
- "Beard", directed by Shunji Dodo
- "Mont Ventoux", directed by Jonas Mekas
- "Home", directed by Kazuhiro Sōda
- "Untitled", directed by Zhao Ye
- "Yayoi-March-", directed by Takushi Nishinaka
- "Watering", directed by Wisut Ponnimit
- "Hope of Light", directed by Leslie Kee
- "Iki", directed by Bong Joon Ho
- "Berlin, 2011", directed by So Yong Kim (as So-yong Kim)
- "Musubi", directed by Toyoko Yamasaki
- "Untitled", directed by Mohd Naguib Razak
- "A Moment on Earth", directed by Pedro González-Rubio
- "People Have the Power", directed by Steven Sebring and Patti Smith
- "Ana, Three Minutes", directed by Víctor Erice
- "Home", directed by Naomi Kawase

== Cast ==
- Patti Smith as herself

== Production ==
In May 2011, producer and director Naomi Kawase announced her intention to commission short films of 3 minutes and 11 seconds in length from various directors as a commemoration of the date the 2011 Tōhoku earthquake and tsunami.

In an interview with producer and director Naomi Kawase after the anthology's completion in 2012, interviewer Yamato Nadeshiko of the magazine Highlighting Japan, published by the Public Relations Office of the Government of Japan, said to her, "After the Great East Japan Earthquake, you appealed to directors around the world to make '3.11 A Sense of Home Films.' Please tell us about your reasons." Naomi Kawase responded, "Many people lost their homes and towns in the Great East Japan Earthquake. When I was thinking about doing something through film, I had the idea of asking directors around the world to participate in making a film that would cast a new light on their homes and towns. Directors overseas reacted to the tragedy that occurred in Japan as if it had happened to them, and submitted works. Victor Erice, the great Spanish director, contributed the phrase 'The Planet Earth is the home of human kind' with his work. I was really happy when the evacuees from the Great East Japan Earthquake thanked us after seeing the film."

== Release ==
The anthology film was originally planned to premiere in Naomi Kawase's hometown of Nara, Japan, at the Nara International Film Festival on September 11, 2011, but ended up premiering at the festival on September 19, 2011.

== Reception ==
The website onderhond.com gave the film a rating of 1.5 out of 5, writing, "Not a single one of the short films was memorable. The technical qualities of the films are subpar, the topic is handled with limited respect, and most of the entries felt like hobby projects. At least the variety carried me through the shortish runtime, but this could've been so much better. Disappointing."

Reviewer Nicolas Bardot of filmdeculte.com gave the film a rating of 4 out of 6 stars, writing, "We know that the so-called omnibus exercise, where various short films on the same theme are brought together, is often a complex, repetitive, and necessarily uneven task. But the theme is broad and universal, and invites diverse interpretations. There are, of course, some missteps. [...] Some works choose to represent the tragedy directly. [...] For others, the home is a body. [...] Two short films stand out in particular from the ensemble. The mysterious and elliptical one by Jia Zhang-Ke, carried by the evocative power of its images (a literally fiery massage) as well as their visual quality. And, above all, that of Naomi Kawase (read our interview here). Nothing new in Kawasian grammar (Super 8 film, wind in the grass, presence of ancestors), but his stripped-down work best expresses what home is, with the hypersensitive grace that inhabits his feature films. Home is already one of the main questions in his filmography. Implicitly, a self-portrait: going through life. In 3 minutes flat, his short film manages to be moving."

Kenta McGrath of sensesofcinema.com included the anthology film in his article about "3/11 Cinema".
