= X=Prem =

2022 Indian Bengali film

- Theatrical release poster
- Directed by: Srijit Mukherji
- Written by: Srijit Mukherji
- Produced by: Shree Venkatesh Films
- Starring: Anindya Sengupta; Shruti Das; Arjun Chakrabarty; Madhurima Basak
- Cinematography: Subhankar Bhar
- Edited by: Sanglap Bhowmik
- Music by: Saptak Sanai Das
- Production company: Shree Venkatesh Films
- Distributed by: Shree Venkatesh Films
- Release date: 3 June 2022
- Running time: 116 minutes
- Country: India
- Language: Bengali

X=Prem is a 2022 Indian Bengali-language black-and-white science fiction romance drama film directed by Srijit Mukherji and starring Anindya Sengupta, Shruti Das and Arjun Chakraborty in lead roles. It is produced by Shrikant Mohta and Mahendra Soni under the banner of Shree Venkatesh Films. It was a flop at the box office despite receiving positive reviews from the critics. It is a monochromatic film.

The soundtrack "Bhalobashar Morshum" sung by Shreya Ghoshal & Arijit Singh became one of the most popular and charting songs of 2022. The lyrics for the song were written by Barish and it was composed by Saptak Sanai Das.

== Plot ==
Khilat (Sengupta) is a brilliant Computer Science student successfully working for an international company but his life turns upside down when he meets with an accident while on a road trip with his fiancée, Joyee (Das). Things become complicated when Khilat finds out that he is suffering from Retrograde Amnesia as a result of which he has lost memories from the past 10 years of his life. He meets Dr. Kaufman who tells him about an experimental procedure where the latter can implant memories of other's brains into Khilat's. Khilat, out of his desperation to get back his job asks for the professional memories to be restored but also comes up with an unusual request- to implant the memories of having fallen in love so that he can reunite with his girlfriend, Joyee. Although Dr. Kaufman succeeds in implanting the memories of his professional qualification, he fails to implant the memories of love as he needs a brain who loves Joyee like Khilat did. He asks Khilat and Joyee to find someone who matches the profile they need.

Joyee, on the other hand, tries to restore Khilat's memories by telling him how their love story began and how they met, their first kiss, first lovemaking and about moments they spent together. But Khilat fails to recall his past. When all her efforts go in vain, Joyee finally decides to follow Dr. Kaufman's plan and starts looking for the person who was in love with her just like Khilat. They find out that there was a guy in college who used to stalk Joyee but she never crossed paths with him. They try to get all the details about the guy by asking around in the campus but keep hitting dead ends. Joyee finally gets in touch with a friend whose brother works in a famous social media company and he helps them to find out the list of people who visit Joyee's social media profile on a regular basis. They learn about Arnab, who stalks Joyee's social media profile every day despite not being on her friend list.

Arnab (Chakraborty), the secret lover, was a senior in Joyee's college. He used to stalk her and make blank calls. At present, Arnab is married to Aditi but is unable to enjoy a happy conjugal life because he still has feelings for Joyee. Aditi knows all about Arnab's unrequited love for Joyee but she has agreed to compromise and accept Arnab as her husband because she loves him a lot and doesn't want to lose him. Khilat and Joyee go to Arnab's place and request him to help restore Khilat's memories. Skeptical about the memory-extraction process and the unknown risks involved, Aditi declines their request and refuses to let Arnab undergo the procedure. However Arnab, for the sake of Aditi and the unconditional sacrifice she has made for him, wants to get rid of all the memories of Joyee. He hides his decision to go ahead with the procedure from Aditi.

Dr. Kaufman extracts all the memories of Joyee from Arnab's brain successfully. As a result, Arnab fails to recognize Joyee at the end of the procedure. Arnab goes back to Aditi and passionately makes love to her. Aditi has never felt so deeply loved by her husband because Arnab had always been emotionally attached to Joyee. Khilat goes through the memory-implantation process and it just seems to be a success.

One year later, Khilat is on a date with Joyee. He confesses that his brain rejected the memories of Arnab that day a year before, and he realized that love can't be forced. So, he decided to not tell anything about that to Joyee, considering her immense love for him. But over the course of one year, he has developed new feelings for Joyee and that's why he has been happy with their relationship. Joyee gets upset with Khilat for not telling her the truth. But she finally forgives him, understands his reasons and locks lips with Khilat. Both the couples are shown to have a really happy ending at the end of the movie.

== Cast ==
- Anindya Sengupta as Khilat
- Shruti Das as Joyee
- Arjun Chakrabarty as Arnab
- Madhurima Basak as Aditi
- Richard Bhakti Klein as Dr. Kaufman

== Release ==
The film released theatrically on 3 June, 2022.

== Soundtrack ==
X=Prem
- Soundtrack album cover

Soundtrack album by Saptak Sanai Das
- Released: 2022
- Recorded: 2021
- Genre: Film soundtrack
- Length: 26:17
- Language: Bengali
- Label: SVF
- Producer: SVF

Official audio
- Full Album on YouTube

The music of the film has been composed by Saptak Sanai Das. This film marked his debut as a music director in Bengali cinema. The lyrics have been penned by Barish, Dhrubojyoti Chakrabarty and Srijit Mukherji.

Later, two more versions of the track "Bhalobashar Morshum" was released. A duet romantic version of Arijit Singh and Shreya Ghoshal was released along with the lyrics. A coloured version of the duet song was also released, in a partnership with Sunlight.

Track listing
No.	Title	Singer(s)	Length
1.	"Bhalobashar Morshum (Female)"	Shreya Ghoshal	4:20
2.	"Cinderella Mon"	Sanai	4:27
3.	"Baaynabilashi"	Sahana Bajpaie, Samantak Sinha	4:12
4.	"Roder Nishana"	Sanai	5:06
5.	"Raikishori"	Anushka Das	3:53
6.	"Bhalobashar Morshum (Male)"	Arijit Singh	4:19
Total length:			26:17

== Reception ==
The film was greeted by positive reviews. The Times of India review mentions the slow pace of the movie and the predictable climax. Cinestaan reviewed the film as "an intriguing study of the human mind and the realm of emotions ". In its review, Anandabazar Patrika mentions the college life nostalgia portrayed in the film, praises the dialogues and criticizes variable importance given to the four main actors. The review in Ei Samay mentions that the film uses too many English dialogues and talks about the mix of romance and sci-fi genres. Critic Ushasie Chakraborty in her Zee 24 Ghanta review lauds the chemistry between the lead actors and praises the music of the film.

== Accolades ==
X=Prem awards and nominations
Award	Ceremony date	Category	Recipients	Result	Ref.
Filmfare Awards Bangla	10 March 2023	Best Supporting Actor	Arjun Chakrabarty	Nominated	
Filmfare Awards Bangla	10 March 2023	Best Debut Male	Anindya Sengupta	Won	
Filmfare Awards Bangla	10 March 2023	Best Debut Female	Shruti Das	Won	
Filmfare Awards Bangla	10 March 2023	Best Music Director	Saptak Sanai Das	Nominated	
Filmfare Awards Bangla	10 March 2023	Best Lyricist	Barish	Nominated	
Filmfare Awards Bangla	10 March 2023	Best Playback Singer – Male	Arijit Singh	Nominated	
Filmfare Awards Bangla	10 March 2023	Best Playback Singer – Female	Shreya Ghosal	Nominated	
Filmfare Awards Bangla	10 March 2023	Best Dialogue	Srijit Mukherji	Nominated	
WBFJA Awards	8 January 2023	Best Director	Srijit Mukherji	Nominated	
WBFJA Awards	8 January 2023	Best Actor	Arjun Chakraborty	Nominated	
WBFJA Awards	8 January 2023	Most Promising Actor	Anindya Sengupta	Nominated	
WBFJA Awards	8 January 2023	Most Promising Actress	Shruti Das	Won	
WBFJA Awards	8 January 2023	Best Music Director	Saptak Sanai Das	Won	
WBFJA Awards	8 January 2023	Best Background Score	Indraadip Dasgupta	Nominated	
WBFJA Awards	8 January 2023	Best Lyricist	Barish	Won	
WBFJA Awards	8 January 2023	Best Male Playback SInger	Arijit Singh; Saptak Sanai Das	Won	
WBFJA Awards	8 January 2023	Best Female Playback Singer	Shreya Ghoshal	Won	
