= Kalkokkho =

2022 Bengali horror film by Rajdeep Paul and Sarmistha Maiti

- Release poster
- Directed by: Rajdeep Paul; Sarmistha Maiti
- Story by: Rajdeep Paul
- Produced by: Anjan Bose
- Starring: Tannistha Biswas; Janardan Ghosh; Sreelekha Mukherji; Amit Saha; Ahana Karmakar
- Cinematography: Rana Pratap Karforma
- Edited by: Sarmistha Maiti; Rajdeep Paul
- Music by: Avijit Kundu
- Production company: Aurora Film Corporation
- Release dates: October 2021 (Busan); 19 August 2022 (India)
- Running time: 125 minutes
- Country: India
- Language: Bengali

Kalkokkho (Bengali pronunciation: [kalˈkɔkʰo]; transl. House of Time) is a 2022 Indian Bengali-language horror film directed by Rajdeep Paul and Sarmistha Maiti. The film stars Tannistha Biswas, Janardan Ghosh, Sreelekha Mukherji, Amit Saha, Ahana Karmakar and Deep Sarker.

It premiered at the 26th Busan International Film Festival in 2021, and won the National Film Award for Best Feature Film in Bengali at India's 69th National Film Awards. The film was also screened at the 1st Eikhoigi Imphal International Film Festival 2022.

== Cast ==
- Tannistha Biswas
- Janardan Ghosh
- Sreelekha Mukherji
- Amit Saha
- Ahana Karmakar
- Deep Sarker

== Production ==
The film began production in December 2020. It was shot within fourteen days at a house in Kolkata, with official confirmation from film director Sarmistha Maiti.

== Reception ==
Allan Hunter of Screen Daily wrote "The film may pay heed to its mystical, supernatural elements, but ultimately reveals its true intentions as a call to arms for compassion and the need to show understanding and enlightenment when humanity is tested to the limit". Akash Misra of Sangbad Pratidin wrote, "The 'panic stricken' feel of the screenplay has come out beautifully due to the direction of Sharmistha-Rajdeep. After seeing the picture, we can control time, or is time our controller? It seems that people will get stuck in the cycle of fear, or will they find a way out. Now let's see how the audience receives this film".
