= Akash Ongshoto Meghla =

- Directed by: Joydip Mukherjee
- Screenplay by: Joydip Mukherjee
- Starring: Rudranil Ghosh; Rahul Banerjee; Ankita Chakraborty; Basabdatta Chatterjee
- Release date: 5 August 2022 (India)
- Running time: 109 minutes
- Country: India
- Language: Bengali

Akash Ongshoto Meghla (transl. The sky is partly cloudy) is a 2022 Indian Bengali-language drama film written and directed by Joydeep Mukherjee. The film stars Rudranil Ghosh, Rahul Banerjee, Basabadatta Chatterjee, Ankita Chakraborty and Devdut Ghosh, and was theatrically released on 5 August 2022.

== Cast ==
- Rudranil Ghosh as Rasam
- Rahul Banerjee as Anirban
- Basabadatta Chatterjee as Anandi
- Ankita Chakraborty as Alpana
- Angel Ghosh as Prabhas Mukherjee
- Kaushik Kar as Alok
- MD Ahmad as Devabrat Bose
- Tarang Banerjee as Party worker
- Arpita Vanik as The lady of the balcony
