= Filmfare Awards Bangla =

Bengali segment of the annual Filmfare Awards

- Current: 8th Filmfare Awards Bangla
- Awarded for: Best in Bengali cinema
- Country: India
- Presented by: Filmfare
- First award: 1963-1985; Re-started in 2014
- Final award: 18 March 2025
- Website: Filmfare Awards Bangla

Television/radio coverage
- Network: Colors Bangla (2014–2021); Zee Bangla (2022–present)

Filmfare Awards Bangla is the Bengali segment of the annual Filmfare Awards, presented by the Filmfare magazine of The Times Group to honour the artistic and cinematic excellence in Bengali cinema. When it was introduced in 1954, the Filmfare Awards initially recognized achievements only in the Hindi cinema. In 1964 the awards were extended to Telugu, Tamil, Bengali and Marathi languages. But the Bengali segment was discontinued after 1985 for unknown reasons.

After being discontinued for almost three decades, the award ceremony was restarted in 2014 and renamed as the Filmfare Awards East. The first installment of the awards was held collectively for Bengali, Assamese and Odia films as Filmfare Awards East, in a ceremony on 29 March 2014.

The award ceremony was discontinued again for two consecutive years in 2015 and 2016, due to unequal representation, award distribution and importance among the 3 film industries. It was again started from 2017, rebranded as Filmfare Awards Bangla and presently, it is given only to the Bengali Film Industry.

== History ==
The awards were first given in 1953 as the Filmfare Awards and initially only the Hindi film industry was recognized. In 1963, the Awards were extended to Best Picture in Telugu, Tamil, Bengali and Marathi film industries. Special categories for Best Director, Best Actor and Best Actress were introduced from 1974. But for unknown reasons, the Filmfare Awards Bangla segment was discontinued after 1985.

Later in 2014, after almost 3 decades, this award segment was revived and rebranded as the "Filmfare Awards East". That year onwards, separate categories for the other Special Awards were introduced. On 8 March 2014, in a press conference held at Kolkata, the Worldwide Media Group announced that Filmfare Award is debuting in Eastern India named as "Filmfare Awards East" to honour the best cinematic artistic talents of the region.

In the inaugural installment, it was declared that awards in 29 categories would be given away at the Science City auditorium, Kolkata on 29 March 2014. The awards would include 21 trophies for Bengali movies and four each for Odia and Assamese films. The four categories for both Odia and Assamese films were Best Film, Best Director, Best Actor and Best Actress. The winners were selected from 102 entries in Bengali films, 36 and 14 entries respectively from the Odia and Assamese films.

The Award ceremony was again briefly discontinued and not hosted in 2015 and 2016 due to the unequal representation and award distribution among the three film industries. From 2017 the award is given only to Bengali film industry. No awards were given in 2019 and 2020 owing to the then ongoing COVID-19 pandemic. 2021 onwards, the award was once again rebranded as the "Filmfare Awards Bangla" and is given only to the Bengali film industry.

== The Red Carpet ==
The red carpet is a segment that takes place before the beginning of the actual ceremony. This is where actors, actresses, producers, directors, singers, composers and others who have contributed to Bengali cinema are introduced. Hosts question the celebrities about upcoming performances and who they think deserves to take the Black Lady home.

== Popular awards ==
- Best Film
- Best Director
- Best Actor
- Best Actress
- Best Supporting Actor
- Best Supporting Actress
- Best Male Debut
- Best Female Debut
- Best Debut Director
- Best Music Director
- Best Lyricist
- Best Male Playback Singer
- Best Female Playback Singer

== Critics' awards ==
- Best Film (Critics)
- Best Actor (Critics)
- Best Actress (Critics)

== Technical awards ==
- Best Story
- Best Screenplay
- Best Dialogue
- Best Art Direction
- Best Background Score
- Best Cinematography
- Best Editing
- Best Sound Design
- Best Costume Design

== Special awards ==
- Filmfare Bangla Lifetime Achievement Award

== Winners ==
=== 1963-1985 ===
(No other nominees were present)

1963

Best Film	Mahanagar – R. D. Bhansal

1964

Best Film	Charulata – R. D. Bhansal

1965

Best Film	Atithi – S. N. Sircar

1966

Best Film	Balika Badhu – Samila Devi

1967

Best Film	Hatey Bazarey – Asim Dutta

1968

Best Film	Apanjan – R. K. Kapoor

1969

Best Film	Kamal Lata – Nirel Sil

1970

Best Film	Pratidwandi – Nepal Dutta Asim Dutta

1971

Best Film	Nimantran – Bharat Shumsher Jung Bahadur Rana

1972

Best Film	Mem Saheb – Ashim Bhattacharjee

1973

Best Film	Strir Patra – Dhrupadi

1974

Best Film	Best Director
Amanush – Shakti Samanta	Piyush Bose – Bikaley Bhorer Phool
Best Actor	Best Actress
Uttam Kumar- Amanush	Aparna Sen – Sujata

1975

Best Film	Best Director
Sansar Simante – Subir Ghosh	Satyajit Ray – Sonar Kella
Best Actor	Best Actress
Soumitra Chatterjee – Sansar Simante	Suchitra Sen – Priyo Bandhabi

1976

Best Film	Best Director
Jana Aranya – Subir Guha	Satyajit Ray – Jana Aranya
Best Actor	Best Actress
Pradip Mukherjee – Jana Aranya	Aparna Sen – Asamaya

1977

Best Film	Best Director
Ek Je Chhilo Desh – Raj Kapoor	Ritwik Ghatak – Jukti Takko Aar Gappo
Best Actor	Best Actress
Soumitra Chatterjee- Babu Moshai	Supriya Devi – Sister

1978

Best Film	Best Director
Baarbodhu – Dehabrata Sircar	Bijoy Chatterjee – Baarbodhu
Best Actor	Best Actress
Uttam Kumar- Dhanraj Tamang	Gita Siddharth – Baarbodhu

1979

Best Film	Best Director
Ganadevata – Department of Information and Cultural Affairs, Government of West Bengal	Satyajit Ray – Joi Baba Felunath
Best Actor	Best Actress
Soumitra Chatterjee- Ganadevata	Sandhya Roy – Ganadevata

1980

Best Film	Best Director
Bancharamer Bagan	Tapan Sinha – Bancharamer Bagan
Best Actor	Best Actress
Manoj Mitra- Bancharamer Bagan	Mahua Roychoudhury – Dadar Kirti

1981

Best Film	Best Director
Dooratwa – Buddhadeb Dasgupta	Buddhadeb Dasgupta – Dooratwa
Best Actor	Best Actress
Tapas Paul- Saheb	Sumitra Mukherjee – Baisakhi Megh

1982

Best Film	Best Director
Kharij – Mrinal Sen	Mrinal Sen – Akaler Shandhaney
Best Actor	Best Actress
Dhritiman Chatterjee- Akaler Shandhaney	Aparna Sen – Bijoyini

1983

Best Film	Best Director
Chokh – Department of Information & Cultural Affairs, Government of West Bengal	Utpalendu Chakrabarty – Chokh
Best Actor	Best Actress
Soumitra Chatterjee- Agradani	Aparna Sen – Indira

1985

Best Film	Best Director
Parama – Niharendu Guha	Aparna Sen – Parama
Best Actor	Best Actress
Victor Banerjee- Ghare Bairi	Raakhee – Parama

== Ceremonies ==
=== 2014-2018 ===
- 1st Filmfare Awards East - 2014
- 2nd Filmfare Awards East - 2017
- 3rd Filmfare Awards East - 2018

=== 2021-present ===
- 4th Filmfare Awards Bangla - 2021
- 5th Filmfare Awards Bangla - 2022
- 6th Filmfare Awards Bangla - 2023
- 7th Filmfare Awards Bangla - 2024
- 8th Filmfare Awards Bangla - 2025

== See also ==
- Filmfare
- Filmfare Awards
- Bengali Film Industry
- Cinema of India
