= Aay Khuku Aay =

2022 Indian Bengali-language film

- Directed by: Sauvik Kundu
- Screenplay by: Sauvik Kundu; Sugata Sinha
- Story by: Sauvik Kundu
- Produced by: Jeet; Gopal Madnani; Amit Jumrani
- Starring: Prosenjit Chatterjee; Ditipriya Roy
- Cinematography: Indranil Mukherjee
- Edited by: Sujay Datta Ray
- Music by: Ranajoy Bhattacharjee and Savvy
- Production company: Jeetz Filmworks
- Distributed by: Jeetz Filmworks
- Release date: 17 June 2022
- Running time: 128 minutes
- Country: India
- Language: Bengali

Aay Khuku Aay (transl. Come to me, my dear daughter) is a 2022 Indian Bengali-language action drama film written and directed by Sauvik Kundu. Produced by Jeet, Gopal Madnani and Amit Jumrani under the banner Jeetz Filmworks, the film stars Prosenjit Chatterjee and Ditipriya Roy in lead roles. The film is based on the relationship of a father and his daughter in rural Bengal.

== Synopsis ==
The film revolves around the relationship of a single father and his daughter in the suburbs of West Bengal.

== Cast ==
- Prosenjit Chatterjee in dual role as himself and Nirmal Mondal, a doppelgänger of Prosenjit Chatterjee
- Ditipriya Roy as Satabdi Mondal alias Buri
- Sohini Sengupta as MLA Putul Rani Bagchi
- Sankar Debnath as Gosai Kaka, Nirmal's friend
- Rafiath Rashid Mithila as Buri's mother
- Buddhadeb Bhattacharya as local police officer Barman
- Rahul Dev Bose as Sanjay, Buri's friend, Putul's son
- Satyam Bhattacharya as Binoy, a book seller

== Soundtrack ==
Aay Khuku Aay

Soundtrack album by Ranajoy Bhattacharjee, Savvy
- Released: 2022
- Genre: Film soundtrack
- Length: 11:40
- Language: Bengali
- Label: Grassroot Entertainment

Official audio
- Aay Khuku Aay - Full Album on YouTube

The songs are composed by Ranajoy Bhattacharjee and Savvy. The lyrics are penned by Saugata Dutta, Anindya Chatterjee and Ranojay Bhattacharjee.

| No. | Title | Lyrics | Music | Singer(s) | Length |
|---|---|---|---|---|---|
| 1. | "Aay Khuku Aay (Title Track)" | Anindya Chatterjee; Ranajoy Bhattacharjee | Ranajoy Bhattacharjee | Ranajoy Bhattacharjee | 3:58 |
| 2. | "Ebhabeo Preme Pora Jaay" | Ranajoy Bhattacharjee | Ranajoy Bhattacharjee | Antara Mitra | 4:18 |
| 3. | "Premer Golpo Lekh" | Saugata Dutta | Savvy | Prashmita Paul | 3:24 |
| Total length: | | | | | 11:40 |

== Release ==
The official teaser of the film was unveiled on 15 April 2022. The official trailer of the film was unveiled on 22 May 2022. The film was released theatrically on 17 June 2022.
