= Sreelekha Mukherji =

Indian actress

Sreelekha Mukherji is a National Film Award-winning Indian actress, with predominant works in Bengali films. She is known for her lead role in the 1989 film Parshuramer Kuthar, for which she won the National Film Award for Best Actress and the Bengal Film Journalists' Association – Best Supporting Actress Award for Shilpi (1994).

She also appeared as the mother of Debasmita Benarjee (Mukta) in Borolar Ghor (2012), a bilingual Assamese-Bengali romantic movie spiced with comedy. This film was directed and produced by Mani C. Kappan.
