= Nara International Film Festival =

The Nara International Film Festival (なら国際映画祭, Nara Kokusai Eigasai), often shortened to NIFF, is a biennial film festival held in Nara, Nara, Japan.

== Overview ==
When Nara-based filmmaker Naomi Kawase won the Grand Prix at the Cannes Film Festival in 2007 with the film The Mourning Forest, which is set in the Tawara district of Nara, she proposed holding an international film festival in Nara. Having realized the meaning of international film festivals, Kawase wanted to repay her hometown for its kindness and enliven the town with cultural events. Attracting many supporters and volunteers from Nara, the Nara International Film Festival Organizing Committee (an incorporated non-profit organization) was established. The first Nara International Film Festival was held in 2010 with the financial support of mainly local companies, government subsidies, and contributions from individuals who donated ¥10,000 for a NIFF membership.

== Competition ==
=== New talent competition category (International competition) ===
Films in this category must be a director’s first or second feature as well as Japan premiere. The first-prize winner will be honored with a Golden SHIKA Award and also be granted with a privilege to make the next NARAtive project film

=== NARA-wave ===
Student film competition category

This category introduces student films, videos, and moving image arts regardless of genre or length. The first-prize winner will be honored with a Golden KOJIKA Award.

== NARAtive project ==
NARAtive project is designed to promote Nara to the world by making a film in Nara. “NARAtive” is a created word by combining Nara and narrative. Young and emerging talented directors are invited to make films set in Nara. Leading professional film crews and local communities support their shootings. In principle, the right of NARAtive film production is given to the winner of Golden SHIKA Award at each festival. It’s a continuous project. The purpose of the project is to cultivate young filmmakers who will bear the next generation and to contribute to the revitalization of local communities.

Year	Title	Director	Location
2010	LAST CHESTNUTS	Zhao Ye	Kashihara
2010	BION	Toyoko Yamasaki	Nara
2012	INORI	Pedro Gonzalez-Rubio	Totsukawa
2014	A MIDSUMMER'S FANTASIA	Jang Kunjae	Gojo
2016	THE WOLVES OF THE EAST	Carlaos M. Quintela	Higashi-yoshino

== Previous NIFF ==
=== NIFF 2016 ===
- Number of films screened: 65
- Number of visitors: 31,451

==== International competition ====
“Hedi Schneider Is Stuck” (2015/ Germany, Norway) Director: Sonja Heiss

“PURE WHITE” (2015/ Japan) Director: Yoshihiro Sakamoto

“THE BEEKEEPER AND HIS SON” (2016/ Switzerland, Canada) Director: Diedie Weng

“How to Win at Checkers (Every Time)” (2015/ Thailand, USA, Hong Kong, Indonesia) Director: Josh Kim:

“Golden Kingdom” (2015/ USA) Director: Brian Perkins

“Old Stone” (2016/ China, Canada) Director: Johnny Ma

“Nahid” (2015/ Iran) Director: Ida Panahandeh

==== NARA-wave 2016 ====
“NAMI TO TOMONI” Director: Bilal Kawazoe

“BOKU TO DAGASHI NO IE” Director: Kenta Tanaka

“PASSING SHOWER” Director: Masamoto Inada

“TOKERU” Director: Aya Igashi

“CHILDREN ON SOME DAYS” Director: Tomohiro Hirota

“THE SCENE OF YOUTH” Director: Sho Kurihara

“HIDE & SEEK” Director: Kimie Tanaka

“CHOCOLATE CAKE AND HORYUJI TEMPLE” Director: Keita Mukai

“KAWASAKI VELODROME” Director: Sayaka Mizuno

== Nara Cinematheque ==
Worried about the fact that no movie theater is located in the prefectural capital of Nara, NIFF Organizing Committee holds a monthly screening at various places to help Nara citizens make a habit of going to the movies. Generally, screenings are organized on the second Friday, Saturday and Sunday of each month. A navigator appears before and after the screening, giving preshow introduction and post-show discussion with audience.
