= Abar Bochhor Koori Pore =

2022 Indian Bengali film

- Release poster
- Directed by: Srimanta Senguptta
- Written by: Srimanta Senguptta; Monali Sen Choudhury
- Screenplay by: Srimanta Senguptta; Monali Sen Choudhury
- Produced by: Prateek Chakravorty; Soumya Sarkar; Animesh Ganguly
- Starring: Abir Chatterjee; Rudranil Ghosh; Tanusree Chakraborty; Arpita Pal
- Cinematography: Pratip Mukherjee
- Edited by: Debashis Das
- Music by: Ranajoy Bhattacharjee
- Production companies: PSS Entertainments; Pramod Films
- Release date: 18 January 2022
- Country: India
- Language: Bengali

Abar Bochhor Koori Pore is a 2022 Indian Bengali language drama film co written and directed by Srimanta Senguptta. The film was produced by PSS Entertainments and Pramod Films. The film music was composed by Ranajoy Bhattacharjee. The film stars Abir Chatterjee, Rudranil Ghosh, Tanusree Chakraborty and Arpita Pal. The film was released on 18 January 2022.

== Plot ==
Five childhood friends come together twenty years since they last met. They have all changed, some more than the others. The group consists of Nila, Arun, Dutta, Bony, and Jayanta. Arun and Bony were married, but have since gotten divorsed. Nila gets busy with her own family life. Jayanta goes missing.

One day Arun tells Dutta that he is coming to Kolkata. They decide to meet up all together like before. Dutta agrees and they meet up with Nila and Bony .When they meet up once again, they remember and relive their childhood together again.

== Cast ==
- Abir Chatterjee
- Rudranil Ghosh
- Tanusree Chakraborty
- Arpita Pal
- Anirban Bhattacharya
- Sumanta Mukhopadhyay
- Ravi Shaw
- Swagata Bose
- Pushan Dasgupta
- Tanika Bose
- Rajarshi Nag
- Dibyasha Das
- Aritra Dutta Banik
- Arya Dasgupta
