= Dostojee =

- Theatrical Release Poster
- দোস্তজি
- Directed by: Prasun Chatterjee
- Written by: Prasun Chatterjee
- Starring: Arif Shaikh; Asik Shaikh; Jayati Chakraborty
- Cinematography: Tuhin Biswas
- Production company: Kathak Talkies
- Release dates: 12 October 2021 (UK); 11 November 2022 (India)
- Running time: 111 min
- Country: India
- Language: Bengali

Dostojee is a 2021 Indian Bengali-language drama film written and directed by Prasun Chatterjee and produced by Kathak Talkies.

The film won the top prize, the Golden Shika Award, at the Nara International Film Festival for 2022.

== Cast ==
- Arif Shaikh as Safiqul
- Asik Shaikh as Palash
- Jayati Chakraborty
- Anujoy Chattopadhyay
- Swatilekha Kundu

== Production ==
Chatterjee stayed in the village of Murshidabad District for a year in 2013 and wrote the script. The script for Dostojee was initially rejected by several producers.

== Release ==
In June 2020, Dostojee was one of the five films selected by NFDC to go to Cannes.

The film had its world premiere at the 65th BFI London Film Festival in London. The film had its Bangladeshi premiere at the 20th Dhaka International Film Festival. The film was subsequently screened at film festivals across the globe, including the Göteborg Film Festival in Sweden, the Jeonju International Film Festival in South Korea, and the Jio MAMI Mumbai Film Festival, the Dharamshala International Film Festival, and the International Film Festival of Kerala in India. The film screened in the United Arab Emirates at the Sharjah International Film Festival and had its American premieres in international competition at the 39th Chicago International Children's Film Festival. Dostojee was shown at the Nara International Film Festival in Japan later that year, where it was honoured with Golden Sikha Award, and with that the director received the opportunity to make a film in Japan fully financed and produced by Nara IFF as a part of the award.

It was released on 11 November 2022 in Kolkata.

== Reception ==
Saibal Chatterjee of NDTV gave 4 out of 5 stars and wrote, " The film posits friendship and humankind's capacity for empathy as a bulwark against bigotry but does not lose sight of the harsh reality that surrounds us."

== Accolades ==
| Award (Note: Awards, festivals and organizations are in alphabetical order.) | Year of ceremony | Category | Recipient(s) | Result | Ref. |
|---|---|---|---|---|---|
| Olympia International Film Festival | 2021 | Best Child Actor | Arif Shaikh | Won | |
| Jaffna International Cinema Festival | 2022 | Best Debut Film | Dostojee | Won | |
| Malaysian Golden Globe Awards | 2022 | Best Film | Dostojee | Nominated | |
| Malaysian Golden Globe Awards | 2022 | Best Director | Prasun Chatterjee | Nominated | |
| Malaysian Golden Globe Awards | 2022 | Best Actor | Arif Shaikh and Asik Shaikh | Won | |
| Malaysian Golden Globe Awards | 2022 | Best Supporting Actress | Jayati Chakraborty | Nominated | |
| Malaysian Golden Globe Awards | 2022 | Best Cinematography | Tuhin Biswas | Nominated | |
| Malaysian Golden Globe Awards | 2022 | Best Screenplay | Prasun Chatterjee | Nominated | |
| Smile International Film Festival for Children and Youth | 2022 | CIFEJ Prize | Dostojee | Won | |
| Smile International Film Festival for Children and Youth | 2022 | Best Director | Prasun Chatterjee | Won | |
| UK Asian Film Festival | 2022 | Best Film | Dostojee | Won | |
| Nara International Film Festival | 2022 | Golden Shika Award | Dostojee | Won | |
| Sharjah International Film Festival | 2022 | Best Feature Film | Dostojee | Won | |
| 6th Filmfare Awards Bangla | 2023 | Best Film | Dostojee | Won | |
| 6th Filmfare Awards Bangla | 2023 | Critics Award for Best Film | Dostojee | Nominated | |
| 6th Filmfare Awards Bangla | 2023 | Best Director | Prasun Chatterjee | Won | |
| 6th Filmfare Awards Bangla | 2023 | Best Debut Director | Prasun Chatterjee | Nominated | |
| 6th Filmfare Awards Bangla | 2023 | Best Original Story | Prasun Chatterjee | Nominated | |
| 6th Filmfare Awards Bangla | 2023 | Best Screenplay | Prasun Chatterjee | Won | |
| 6th Filmfare Awards Bangla | 2023 | Best Cinematography | Tuhin Biswas | Won | |
| 6th Filmfare Awards Bangla | 2023 | Best Supporting Actress | Jayati Chakraborty | Nominated | |
| 6th Filmfare Awards Bangla | 2023 | Best Sound Design | Prasun Chatterjee and Rohit Sengupta | Nominated | |
| 6th Filmfare Awards Bangla | 2023 | Best Editing | Sujay Datta Ray and Santanu Mukherjee | Nominated | |
