= Habji Gabji =

2022 Indian Bengali-language film

- Film poster
- Directed by: Raj Chakraborty
- Screenplay by: Padmanabha Dasgupta
- Story by: Raj Chakraborty
- Produced by: Raj Chakraborty; Shyam Agarwal
- Starring: Subhashree Ganguly; Parambrata Chatterjee; Samontak Dyuti Maitra
- Cinematography: Manas Ganguly
- Edited by: Md. Kalam
- Music by: Indraadip Dasgupta
- Production companies: Raj Chakraborty Entertainment; Srijan Arts
- Release date: 3 June 2022
- Country: India
- Language: Bengali

Habji Gabji is a 2022 Indian Bengali-language techno-thriller film written and directed by Raj Chakraborty. The film is jointly produced by Raj Chakraborty and Shyam Agarwal under the banners of Raj Chakraborty Entertainment and Srijan Arts, respectively. The film is based on the effects of online gaming on children and youth. The film features Subhashree Ganguly, Parambrata Chatterjee and Samontak Dyuti Maitra as lead characters.

== Synopsis ==
Ahana and Aditya are a workaholic couple who don't get much time to spend with their son Anish, nicknamed Tipu, because of their work schedule. So Aditya introduces him to mobile gaming, but as time passes and he enters his teenage years, he gets more addicted, and even aggressive, following the arrival of online gaming (like PUBG or Free Fire). After being sent to the hospital due to a severe anxiety attack, his parents start blaming each other, eventually realizing the consequences of their negligence. However, it is too late, as they cannot help him even with the help of psychiatrists.

== Cast ==
- Subhashree Ganguly as Ahana Basu
- Parambrata Chatterjee as Aditya Basu
- Samontak Dyuti Maitra as teen Anish Basu/Tipu
  - Osh Mallick as infant Anish Basu/Tipu
- Suprovat Das as a Police Investigator
- Padmanabha Dasgupta as Arjun Da
- Anirban Bhattacharya as Dr. Arunangshu Roy

== Voiceover ==
- Anil Kumar Kami as Police Investigator

== Soundtrack ==
Habji Gabji

Soundtrack album by Indraadip Dasgupta
- Released: 2022
- Genre: Film soundtrack
- Length: 6:30
- Language: Bengali
- Label: Raj Chakraborty Entertainment

All the songs are composed by Indraadip Dasgupta. The lyrics are penned by Srijato and Ritam Sen.

No.	Title	Lyrics	Singer(s)	Length
1.	"Dure"	Srijato	Papon & Iman Chakraborty	3:07
2.	"Eka Eka Aami"	Ritam Sen	Mohan Kannan	3:23
Total length:				6:30

== Release ==
The trailer released on 14 November 2020. The film released theatrically on 3 June 2022.
