= Mahananda (film) =

2022 Indian Bengali-language film by Arindam Sil

- Theatrical release poster
- Directed by: Arindam Sil
- Written by: Arindam Sil; Shubhendu Dasmunshi
- Produced by: Firdausul Hasan; Probal Halder
- Starring: Gargi Roychowdhury; Debshankar Halder; Ishaa Saha; Arno Mukhopadhyay
- Cinematography: Ayan Sil
- Edited by: Sanglap Bhowmik
- Music by: Bickram Ghosh
- Production company: Friends Communication
- Distributed by: SSR Cinemas
- Release date: 8 April 2022
- Running time: 132 minutes
- Country: India
- Language: Bengali

Mahananda is a 2022 Indian Bengali-language biographical film directed by Arindam Sil. The film is produced by Firdausul Hasan and Probal Halder under the banner of Friends Communication. The film is based on the life and works of the eminent writer and socio-political activist Mahasweta Devi. The film stars Gargi Roychowdhury in the title role.

== Plot ==
Mohal Basu, an enthusiastic college student, wants to pursue her PhD research on the writer and socio-political activist Mahananda Bhattacharya. For that, she goes to Mahananda herself and a series of events occur in their lives which change Mohal mentally.

== Cast ==
- Gargi Roychowdhury as Mahananda Bhattacharya, an eminent writer and socio-political activist
- Debshankar Haldar as Bidhan Bhattacharya, husband of Mahananda Bhattacharya
- Ishaa Saha as Mohal Basu, a PhD scholar who is researching on the life and works of Mahananda Bhattacharya
- Arno Mukhopadhyay as Bihan, Mohal's boyfriend

== Soundtrack ==
Mahananda

Soundtrack album by Bickram Ghosh
- Released: 14 March 2022
- Genre: Film soundtrack
- Length: 18:44
- Language: Bengali
- Label: Friends Communication

Official audio
- Mahananda - Full Album on YouTube

All the songs are composed by Bickram Ghosh and the lyrics are penned by Subhendu Dasmunshi.

No.	Title	Lyrics	Music	Singer(s)	Length
1.	"Rong Dhorese"	Subhendu Dasmunshi	Bickram Ghosh	Sahana Bajpaie	2:34
2.	"Amar E Poth"	Rabindranath Tagore	Rabindranath Tagore	Sahana Bajpaie	2:05
3.	"Mati Amar"	Subhendu Dasmunshi	Bickram Ghosh	Sahana Bajpaie	3:26
4.	"Hey Ote"	Subhendu Dasmunshi	Bickram Ghosh	Dipannita Acharya	3:51
5.	"Dhanuk Uthao"	Subhendu Dasmunshi	Bickram Ghosh	Timir Biswas, Dipannita Acharya	3:16
6.	"Dhol Baje"	Subhendu Dasmunshi	Bickram Ghosh	Dipannita Acharya	0:37
7.	"Jhanshi Song"	Subhendu Dasmunshi	Bickram Ghosh	Dipannita Acharya	2:04
Total length:					18:44

== Release ==
The film was theatrically released on 8 April 2022.

== Reception ==
Mahananda has received positive to mixed reviews, with critics praising its narrative structure and performances but criticizing the characterization of its protagonist. Sandipta Bhanja of The Indian Express wrote "The heart of this film is the music of Bickram Ghosh. Which gave another dimension to 'Mahananda'. Be it the use of Santali instruments in the background music or the song 'Rong Dhorese' sung by Sahana Bajpai. 'Mahananda' once again proved that Arindam-Bickram duo has undoubtedly set another milestone in Bengali cinema music. How did the indomitable struggle of a woman, the force of her mental strength put the ruling party in confusion? If you want to know then you can watch 'Mahananda' in theatres". Ranabir Bhattacharyya of Hindustan Times wrote "The early events of Mahananda's life are especially marked on the screen. Bijan Bhattacharya's conversation with Mahasweta Devi seems to be caught effortlessly in moments of humility like those of Mahananda and Bidhan Bhattacharya. In Arno Mukhopadhyay, Ishaa Saha also catches the eye with their easy chemistry. Bickram Ghosh's music scheme has given a worthy accompaniment. And of course Sahana Bajpaie's songs should not be missed!Sabarni Das' costume design is the asset of this movie".
