= Abar Kanchanjungha =

2022 Indian Bengali-language film

- Directed by: Raajhorshee De
- Written by: Padmanabha Dasgupta; Raajhorshee De
- Produced by: Akshatt K Pandey
- Starring: Rupankar Bagchi; Rahul Banerjee; Gaurav Chakrabarty; Bidipta Chakraborty; Tanushree Chakraborty; Arpita Chatterjee; Saswata Chatterjee; Padmanabha Dasgupta; Devlina Kumar; Kaushik Sen
- Cinematography: Gopi Bhagat
- Edited by: Sanglap Bhowmik
- Music by: Ashu Chakraborty
- Release date: 1 April 2022
- Country: India
- Language: Bengali

Abar Kanchanjungha is a 2022 Indian Bengali-language family drama film directed by Raajhorshee De. The screenplay was written by Padmanabha Dasgupta and Raajhorshee De. The film features an ensemble cast including Anindya Chatterjee, Rupankar Bagchi, Rahul Banerjee, Gaurav Chakrabarty, Bidipta Chakraborty, Tanushree Chakraborty, Arpita Chatterjee, Saswata Chatterjee, Padmanabha Dasgupta, Devlina Kumar, and Kaushik Sen. The film was produced by Akshatt K Pandey, and Shilpi A Pandey. It was released theatrically on 1 April 2022 and digitally on 26 May 2023 on ZEE5.

== Plot ==
The film is set in Darjeeling and revolves around the Deb family. The eldest son of the family Nishith invites his brothers Sudev, Debesh, and Rohit, along with their sister Semonti and her husband Tridib (for the first time), to their ancestral home named "Abhilash" in Darjeeling on the eve of Christmas. The reunion is intended to rekindle their childhood memories, but as the story unfolds, each character reveals secrets, makes major revelations, and works towards restoring broken promises. The film delves into the family dynamics and explores the belief in miracles that binds the family together.

== Cast ==
- Arpita Pal as Semanti
- Saswata Chatterjee as Tridib
- Kaushik Sen as Nisith
- Gaurav Chakrabarty as Rohit
- Rahul as Debesh
- Padmanava Dasgupta as Sudeb
- Bidipta Chakraborty as Rini
- Tanusree Chakraborty as Ruchira
- Debosree Ganguly as Ritangana
- Devlina Kumar as Angelina
- Anindya Chatterjee as Sunayan
- Ranita Dasgupta as Ritoja
- Rupankar Bagchi as Debmalya
- Priyanka Rati Pal as Sananda
- Sohini Guha Roy as Atisha
- Ashim Roychowdhury as Jagdish Da
- Richa Sharma as Surita

== Production ==
The film was directed by Raajhorshee De as a tribute to Satyajit Ray's Kanchenjungha and was written by Padmanabha Dasgupta and De. It was produced by Akshatt K Pandey, and Shilpi A Pandey. The music for the film was composed by Ashu Chakraborty, cinematography was handled by Gopi Bhagat, and the editing was done by Sanglap Bhowmik.

The filming took place in various locations in Darjeeling and its surroundings.

== Release ==
=== Theatrical ===
Abar Kanchanjungha was released in theaters across West Bengal on 1 April 2022.

=== Home media ===
The digital rights of the film were acquired by ZEE5.

== Reception ==
The film received mixed reviews from critics. Shamayita Chakraborty of The Times of India rated the film 2.5/5, praising the performances of the actors, particularly highlighting Arpita Chatterjee's performance and Rahul Banerjee's portrayal of a politician. Roushni Sarkar from Cinestaan found the character arcs weak, making the multi-starrer film predictable. Suparna Majumder of Sangbad Pratidin appreciated the acting by both renowned and lesser-known actors and praised the songs composed by Ujjaini and Anupam Roy.
