= Bismillah (film) =

2022 Indian Bengali film

- Directed by: Indraadip Dasgupta
- Produced by: Samiran Das; Sujata Das; Ajay Jhunjhunwala
- Starring: Riddhi Sen; Subhashree Ganguly; Kaushik Ganguly; Surangana Bandyopadhyay; Gaurav Chakrabarty; Bidipta Chakraborty; Aparajita Auddy
- Cinematography: Subhankar Bhar
- Edited by: Sujay Datta Ray
- Music by: Indraadip Dasgupta
- Production company: Kaleidoscope
- Release date: 19 August 2022
- Running time: 156 minutes
- Country: India
- Language: Bengali

Bismillah is a 2022 Indian Bengali-language musical drama film directed by Indraadip Dasgupta. The film is produced by Samiran Das under the banner of Kaleidoscope. The film stars Riddhi Sen in the title role. The film depicts the traditions of a musical family and journey of young musician.

== Plot ==
It focuses on the tradition of a musical family and how foreign intrusion creates disturbance in it. "A musician not only goes through music but his or her surroundings and environment molds him or her growth as well with the growth, his or her music begins to take a shape and changes too".

== Synopsis ==
Bishu (alias: Bismillah) hails from a Shehnai playing family living below the poverty line in a rural village of Bengal, where, due to the insurgence of Digital Music all over India, Shehnai as an instrument became decadent and a dying art form thereby losing the connect to the root, which is Indian traditional music and art form.

On the contrary, Bishu a bohemian by nature, loves to play the flute. He roams around the village and the outskirts considering himself to be Lord Krishna eternally in search of Radha and Meera. By tradition and culture, flute is not allowed to be played by any Muslim family in the village. But if Bishu doesn't take up Shehnai as his instrument of expression, then he will eventually loose out on being the torch bearer of the Shehnai playing tradition of the family who mainly plays for various cultural and ritualistic ceremonies to make a living. Under the constant persuasion of his father, Bade Ustad, Bismillah takes up Shehnai, under his tutelage. But his heart remains with playing the flute, roaming around over the mountains, down the valleys, near the rivers and the brooks of the village.

Bismillah's main intervention seems to be DJ Shibu, who is the reigning entertainment music provider of the village then. Hence his battle becomes two folded, one where he had to leave flute and take up Shehnai as his main instrument and secondly, cutting through the uptight market of DJ Shibu and making a mark for himself in the society, thereby regaining the lost monastery of the Indian Traditional Music and heritage.

In this quest for survival, Bismillah comes across destiny, love lost and found and lost again. The film Bismillah is a journey of a Musician through the lanes of destiny for re-establishing the novelty of traditional music and instrument against the upsurge of digitization of music, paved by various emotional relationship and eternal quest for love.

== Cast ==
- Riddhi Sen as Bismillah alias Bisu
- Subhashree Ganguly as Fatima
- Surangana Bandyopadhyay in double role as Leela and Uma
- Kaushik Ganguly as Rashid Ali
- Bidipta Chakraborty as Shakila
- Gaurav Chakrabarty as Shibu
- Aparajita Auddy as Momina
- Sneha Chatterjee as Safina
- Anindita Raychaudhury as Maya
- Padmanabha Dasgupta as Hamid Ali
- Agnijit Sen as Fuyad
- Sarthak Das as Akram
- Joydeep Kundu as Post Master Ramchandra
- Indranil Roy as Maniram
- Debapratim Dasgupta as Kalu Sekh

== Production ==
Bismillah was the second film directed by Indraadip Dasgupta, after Kedara (2019). The film depicts Indians rich cultural music and heritage. The film also voices against communal disharmony.

The principal photography of the film started on 20 January 2020. The Purulia schedule of the film began on 30 January 2020. The film was wrapped up on 17 February 2020.

The makeup artist of the film is Somnath Kundu. The production design is handled by Ranajit Gharai. The costumes are designed by Abhishek Roy. The songs are choreographed by Sudarshan Chakraborty. The colourist of the film is Debojyoti Ghosh. The sound design and mix is done by Subhadeep Mitra.

== Soundtrack ==
Bismillah

Soundtrack album by Indraadip Dasgupta
- Released: 2022
- Genre: Film soundtrack
- Length: 42:55
- Language: Bengali
- Label: SVF Music

All the songs are composed by Indraadip Dasgupta. The lyrics are penned by Srijato and Ritam Sen.

Track listing
No.	Title	Lyrics	Singer(s)	Length
1.	"Bismillah Title Track"	Srijato	Arijit Singh	5:01
2.	"Keno Je Tomakey"	Srijato	Shreya Ghoshal, Soumyadeep Murshidabadi	6:51
3.	"Tomake Dekhini"	Ritam Sen	Amrita Singh Majumder	4:32
4.	"Allah Re Bandey"	Srijato	Soumyadeep Murshidabadi	4:27
5.	"Aajkey Raatey"	Srijato	Arijit Singh	4:28
6.	"Keno Rong Dile Mohey"	Srijato	Kaushiki Chakraborty	5:47
7.	"Tandav"	Srijato	Shovon Ganguly	4:34
8.	"Ami Dukkho Paiya"	Padmanabha Dasgupta	Debayan Banerjee	3:34
9.	"Hedehey Nilaj"	Padmanabha Dasgupta	Debayan Banerjee	3:41
Total length:				42:55

== Release ==
The trailer of the film released on 28 July 2022. The film was released on 19 August 2022 on the occasion of Janmashtami.
