= Abhijaan (2022 film) =

2022 Indian Bengali-language film

- Theatrical release poster
- Directed by: Parambrata Chatterjee
- Written by: Padmanabha Dasgupta; Dr. Subhendu Sen
- Produced by: Parambrata Chatterjee; Navratan Jhawar
- Starring: Jisshu Sengupta
- Cinematography: Appu Prabhakar
- Edited by: Sumit Chowdhury
- Music by: Prabuddha Banerjee
- Production companies: Roadshow Films; Ratnashree Nirman
- Distributed by: SSR Cinemas
- Release date: 14 April 2022
- Running time: 148 minutes
- Country: India
- Language: Bengali

Abhijaan (transl. The Journey) is a 2022 Indian Bengali-language biographical film directed by Parambrata Chatterjee. The film is based on the life and works of legendary actor and Bengali icon Soumitra Chatterjee. The central character of Soumitra Chatterjee is played by Jisshu Sengupta along with a supporting cast of Prosenjit Chatterjee, Basabdatta Chatterjee, Q, Paoli Dam, Debshankar Haldar, Sohini Sengupta, Rudranil Ghosh, Tridha Choudhury and Parambrata Chatterjee.

== Plot ==
Dr. Sanjay Sen, a practicing oncologist, arrives in Kolkata to fulfil his long-standing dream of archiving the life of legendary actor Soumitra Chatterjee, with the aim of making a film about him. At first, Soumitra turns him down but eventually agrees. The film explores his journey in cinema and his contributions to Bengali film and theater. The story is told through an interview where Parambrata Chatterjee (playing a fictional version of himself) talks with an older Soumitra Chatterjee. Jisshu Sengupta plays Soumitra in his younger years, while the real Soumitra appears in some parts. Through their conversation, the film explores Soumitra's struggles, his thoughts on art and life, and how his connection to cinema changed over time.

== Cast ==
- Jisshu Sengupta as young Soumitra Chatterjee
- Soumitra Chatterjee as himself
- Parambrata Chatterjee as Dr. Sanjay Sen
- Basabdatta Chatterjee as young Deepa Chatterjee
- Sohini Sengupta as Poulami Chatterjee
- Qaushiq Mukherjee as Satyajit Ray
- Prosenjit Chatterjee as Uttam Kumar
- Paoli Dam as Suchitra Sen
- Sohini Sarkar as Madhabi Mukherjee
- Rudranil Ghosh as Rabi Ghosh
- Debshankar Haldar as Sisir Bhaduri
- Tridha Choudhury as Sharmila Tagore
- Tuhina Das as Waheeda Rehman
- Samadarshi Dutta as Sunil Gangopadhyay
- Anindita Bose as Aparna Sen
- Payel Sarkar as Tanuja
- Dulal Lahiri as Chhabi Biswas
- Padmanabha Dasgupta as Anup Kumar
- Abhijit Guha as Santosh Dutta
- Sujan Mukherjee
- Tanusree Chakraborty

== Production ==
The shooting started from February 2020 and halted suddenly due to COVID-19 pandemic. The shooting resumed from 14 July 2020. The shooting was wrapped up on 23 September 2020.

== Release ==
The film released theatrically on 14 April 2022 coinciding Poila Baisakh.

== Reception ==
In The Times of India, Jaya Biswas gave a positive review stating the film "A well-crafted tribute to an artiste by an artiste". In Film Companion, Sankhayan Ghosh wrote "The film is held together by feeling".

== Soundtrack ==
Track listing
No.	Title	Singer(s)	Length
1.	"Tomaro Asimey"	Durnibar Saha	3:15
Total length:			3:15
