= Bidipta Chakraborty =

Indian actress from Kolkata

- Born: 12 June 1973 (age 53); Kolkata, India
- Occupation: Actress
- Spouse: Birsa Dasgupta (m. 2010)
- Children: Mekhla Dasgupta; Ida Dasgupta
- Relatives: Sudipta Chakraborty (sister)

Bidipta Chakraborty is an Indian actress who predominantly works in Bengali films. She had appeared in Debesh Chattopadhyay's play Brain.

== Personal life ==
Bidipta was born to eminent theatre actor Biplab Ketan Chakraborty and dancer Dipali Chakraborty. Her two sisters Sudipta Chakraborty and Bidisha Chakraborty are also actresses. Bidipta married film director Birsa Dasgupta in 2010. Chaitali Dasgupta and Raja Dasgupta are her mother-in-law and father-in-law respectively. Bidipta has a daughter Mekhla from her first marriage whom Birsa adopted as his own. Bidipta and Birsa together have a daughter named Ida Dasgupta who was a child artist in the film Shob Bhooturey.

== Filmography ==
- Bijoyar Pore (2024)
- Mon Kharap (2022)
- Bismillah (2022)
- Sohorer Upokotha (2021)
- Dracula Sir (2020)
- Purba Paschim Dakshin (2019)
- Nagarkirtan (2019)
- Rosogolla (2018)
- Load shedding (2015) Directed by Soukarya Ghosal
- Meghe Dhaka Tara (2013)
- Ami Aadu (2011)
- Chalo Let's Go (2008)
- Abar Aranye (2003)
- Mr. and Mrs. Iyer (2002)

=== Short film/web series ===
Year	Title	Role	Platform	Notes
2018	Action Area 11B			
2019	Sharate Aaj	Ananya	ZEE5	
2022	Uttoron		Hoichoi	
2024	Bijoya	Dr Anuradha Dutta	Hoichoi	
2025	Ronkini Bhavan	Padmavati	ZEE5	

=== Television ===
Year	Serial	Character	Channel
2008 - 2010	Ei Ghor Ei Sangsar	Kaberi's Aunt	Zee Bangla
2009 - 2010	Ogo Bodhu Sundori	Ishaan's Mother	Star Jalsha
2010 - 2013	Keya Patar Nouko	Sona's Mother	Zee Bangla
2011 - 2015	Ishti Kutum	Saanjhbati Mukherjee	Star Jalsha
2013 - 2015	Jol Nupur	Anjana Basu Mallick	Star Jalsha
2014 - 2015	Byomkesh	Mrs. Roy	Colors Bangla
2015 - 2016	Chokher Tara Tui	Jaya / Payel	Star Jalsha
2016	Mahanayak	Shaon Debi (Kanan Devi)	Star Jalsha
2016 - 2017	Kusum Dola	Komolkoli aka Koli	Star Jalsha
2017	Joyee	Mayurakshi (Later replaced by Mayna Bandyopadhyay)	Zee Bangla
2018 - 2019	Shubho Drishti	Annapurna	Colors Bangla
2018 - 2019	Phagun Bou	Amrapali, Mohul's mom.	Star Jalsha
2018 - 2020	Joy Baba Lokenath	Bhairavi	Zee Bangla
2019 - 2021	Alo Chhaya	Maitreyee, Chhaya's mother, Alo's maternal aunt.	Zee Bangla
2020 - 2021	Prothoma Kadambini	Konok Debi, Kadambini's mother.	Star Jalsha
2021	Rimli	Tanisha Mukherjee	Zee Bangla
2022	Mithai	Anuradha Modak	Zee Bangla
2022 - 2024	Pherari Mon	Parama Rai Burman	Colors Bangla
2023 - 2024	Tunte	Mondira	Star Jalsha
2023 - 2024	Jol Thoi Thoi Bhalobasha	Aparajita	Star Jalsha
2024–2026	Grihoprobesh		Star Jalsha

== Awards ==
Year	Award	Category	Character	Film/TV show
2021	WBFJA Awards	Best Supporting Actress	Sobita	Dracula Sir

== See also ==
- Tanusree Chakraborty
- Ushasie Chakraborty
