= The Holy Conspiracy =

- Directed by: Soibal Mitra
- Written by: Soibal Mitra
- Screenplay by: Soibal Mitra
- Story by: Soibal Mitra
- Produced by: Joydeep Roy Chowdhury; Shubhra Sarthi Chakraborty
- Starring: Soumitra Chatterjee; Naseeruddin Shah
- Edited by: Sumit Ghosh
- Music by: Tejendra Narayan Majumder
- Distributed by: Walzen Media Works Pvt. Ltd
- Release date: 2022
- Running time: 143 minutes
- Country: India
- Languages: Bengali, English

The Holy Conspiracy is a 2022 Bengali film directed by Shaibal Mitra, starring Soumitra Chatterjee and Naseeruddin Shah.

== Story ==
Kunal is a science teacher at a Christian missionary school where he is fired and placed in police custody for not teaching biblical cosmology. Old allies Reverend Vasant Kumar Chatterjee and Anton D Souza now face each other in court.

== Cast ==
- Soumitra Chatterjee
- Nasiruddin Shah
- Kaushik Sen
- Subhrajit Dutta
- Biplab Dasgupta
- Amrita Chatterjee
- Sramana Chatterjee|
- Anusuwa Mazumder
- Pradip Roy
- Partha Pratim Majumder
