= Aparajito (2022 film) =

- Theatrical release poster
- Directed by: Anik Dutta
- Written by: Anik Dutta; Sreeparna Mitra; Utsav Mukherjee
- Produced by: Firdausul Hasan; Prabal Haldar
- Starring: Jeetu Kamal
- Cinematography: Supratim Bhol
- Edited by: Arghyakamal Mitra
- Music by: Debojyoti Mishra
- Production company: Friends Communication
- Distributed by: SSR Cinemas
- Release date: 13 May 2022
- Running time: 138 minutes
- Country: India
- Language: Bengali

Aparajito (pronounced [ɔpɔradʒito]), also known as Aparajito – The Undefeated, is a 2022 Indian Bengali-language biographical film directed and co-written by Anik Dutta. Produced by Firdausul Hasan and Probal Halder under the banner of Friends Communication, it is based on the making of the cult classic film Pather Panchali by Satyajit Ray. The film, shot in black and white, stars Jeetu Kamal in the titular role of Aparajito Ray.

== Plot ==
Set in the mid-1950s, the film revolves around the journey and hurdles faced by a young filmmaker Aparajito Ray during the making of his first full-length feature film, Pather Podaboli, inspired by the popular Bengali eponymous novel written by Bibhutibhushan Mukhopadhyay. The film has created a sensation in world cinema and won an international award at the Cannes International Film Festival.

== Cast ==
- Jeetu Kamal as Aparajito Ray alias Apu, the director of the film Pather Podabali (voice dubbed by Chadrasish Ray)
- Saayoni Ghosh as Bimala Ray, Aparajito's wife
- Debashish Roy as Subir Mitra, cinematographer of the film Pather Podabali
- Shoaib Kabeer as Chandragupta Kichlu, production designer of the film Pather Podabali
- Ritwick Purkait as Debashis Burman, assistant director of the film Pather Podabali
- Saunak Samanta as Sunil Choudhury, production manager of the film Pather Podabali
- Mirchi Agni as Shibananda Dasgupta, co-founder of the Calcutta Film Society
- Nilanjan Datta as Radha Prasad Gupta, co-founder of the Calcutta Film Society
- Anjana Basu as Baruna, she plays the role of Sarbamangala in the film Pather Podaboli
- Subhrotavo Dutta as a man who plays the role of Harimadhab in the film Pather Podabali
- Anusha Viswanathan as Devi, she plays the role of Uma in the film Pather Podabali
- Ayush Mukherjee as Prabir, he plays the role of Manik in the film Pather Podabali
- Haro Kumar Gupta as Nanibala Devi, who plays the role of Indira Thakur in the film Pather Podabali
- Rishav Basu as Surja Shankar, music director of the film Pather Podabali
- Anashua Majumdar as Surama Devi, Aparajito Ray's mother
- Samik Bandyopadhyay as the Akashvani representative who interviews Aparajito Ray.
- Manasi Sinha as Rama Devi, wife of Bibhuti Mukhopadhyay, author of the novel Pather Podabali
- Paran Bandopadhyay as Biman Ray, the contemporary Chief Minister of West Bengal
- Barun Chanda as Jawhar Kaul, the contemporary Prime Minister of India

== Production ==
Shooting began on 12 November 2021. Shooting finished on 15 December 2021. The shooting locations include rural Bolpur and Kolkata.

Research for the film was done by Sreeparna Mitra and Prithwiraj Choudhury. The prosthetics and make up were by Somnath Kundu. The costumes were designed by Suchismita Dasgupta. The hair styling was by Hema Munshi and the production design by Ananda Addhya. The colourist was Soumitra Sarkar. Sound was mixed and mastered by Tirthankar Majumdar. The executive producer was Sounak Banerjee.

== Soundtrack ==
Track listing
| No. | Title | Lyrics | Music | Singer(s) | Length |
|---|---|---|---|---|---|
| 1. | "Amader Panchali" | Debojyoti Mishra | Debojyoti Mishra | Arko Mukherjee | 3:55 |
| Total length: | | | | | 3:35 |

== Release ==
A teaser of the film was launched on 15 April 2022 on the occasion of Poila Boisakh. The trailer was launched on 23 April 2022 on the 30th anniversary of the death of Satyajit Ray.

The film was premiered at the National Museum of Indian Cinema on 2 May 2022 at a special screening organised by the Ministry of Information and Broadcasting on the occasion of 101st anniversary of Ray's birth. It was released in cinemas on 13 May 2022.

== Reception ==
=== Critical reception ===
Shyam Benegal appreciated the casting of Jeetu Kamal as Aparajito Ray and the cinematography of the film. Mayank Shekhar of Mid-Day wrote that it was the finest film depicting the making of a film. Sandip Ray praised the film and was emotional to see the portrayal of his father. Taslima Nasrin commented on the film, "Satyajit's name has to be changed to Aparajito, it's a big pain". However, there were allegations that some scenes from the original history had been misrepresented in the film.

=== Box office ===
The film earned Rs 15.4 million in its first week. Four days later, the film grossed Rs 18.6 million. On 24 May, the film earned a total of Rs 24.8 million. From the Saturday of second week to the following Saturday, the film earned more Rs 43 Lakhs.

== Accolades ==
| Year | Award | Category | Result | Ref. |
|---|---|---|---|---|
| 2022 | BRICS Film Festival 2022 | Special Jury Award | Won | |
| 2022 | Diorama International Film Festival 2022 | Best Actor | Won | |
| 2022 | Diorama International Film Festival 2022 | Best Indian Feature Film | Won | |
| 2022 | Diorama International Film Festival 2022 | Best Cinematography | Won | |
| 2023 | WBFJA Awards 2023 | Best Director | Won | |
| 2023 | WBFJA Awards 2023 | Best Promising Actor | Won | |
| 2023 | WBFJA Awards 2023 | Best Screenplay | Won | |
| 2023 | WBFJA Awards 2023 | Best Make-up | Won | |
| 2023 | WBFJA Awards 2023 | Best Costume | Won | |
| 2023 | WBFJA Awards 2023 | Best Background score | Won | |
| 2023 | WBFJA Awards 2023 | Best Art Director | Won | |
| 2023 | Ajanta-Ellora International Film Festival 2022 | Best Actor | Won | |
| 2023 | Ajanta-Ellora International Film Festival 2022 | Best Music Director | Won | |
| 2023 | Ajanta-Ellora International Film Festival 2022 | Best Cinematographer | Won | |
| 2023 | Ajanta-Ellora International Film Festival 2022 | Best Sound Design | Won | |
| 2024 | 70th National Film Awards | Best Makeup | Won | |
| 2024 | 70th National Film Awards | Best Production Design | Won | |
