= Bigg Boss Bangla season 3 =

Bigg Boss Bangla
- Season 3
- Season's logo with host Sourav Ganguly
- Presented by: Sourav Ganguly
- No. of days: 82
- No. of housemates: 20
- No. of episodes: 83

Release
- Original network: JioHotstar; Star Jalsha
- Original release: 30 August 2026 – present

Series chronology
- ← Previous; Season 2

Bigg Boss Bangla 3, also known as Bigg Boss: Durgo Joy Shohoj Noy, is the third season of the Indian Bengali-language reality television series Bigg Boss Bangla. It premiered on 30 August 2026 on Star Jalsha and started streaming digitally on JioHotstar. Hosted by Sourav Ganguly, the season marks as the return of the franchise after 10 years.

== Production ==
=== Development and theme ===
The tagline of the season is Durgo Joy Shohoj Noy. The House followed a Retro theme with colorful retro vibe and pop art elements.

=== Release and promotions ===
On 11 March 2026, Endemol Shine India and Star Jalsha officially announced the renewal of the show at the Eden Gardens with Sourav Ganguly as the new host. The first promo was released across social media in August with a glimpse of five contestants in another promo.

=== Eye logo ===
The eye had humanoid feature this season, with red and golden accents in the iris. The lens depicted the eye as a mechanical one while the iris had golden tick marks. Additionally, the eye had bold golden eyeliners with subtle tick marks on it indicating eyelashes.

=== Broadcast ===
Unlike the previous seasons, the show followed a digital release strategy, with daily episodes streaming on JioHotstar.

== Housemates status ==
SL	Housemates	Day entered	Day exited	Status
1	Monami	Day 1		
2	Jeetu	Day 14		
3	Durnibar	Day 1		
4	Niranjan	Day 1		
5	Srijla	Day 1	Day 23	Walked
5	Srijla	Day 27		
6	Rajveer	Day 7		
7	Tanushree	Day 1		
8	Sourav	Day 48		
9	Ranieeta	Day 48	Day 84	Evicted
10	Sonamoni	Day 1	Day 77	Evicted
11	Nandini	Day 1	Day 63	Evicted
11	Nandini	Day 65	Day 70	Ejected
12	Bharat	Day 1	Day 56	Evicted
13	Jhilam	Day 1	Day 43	Walked
14	Anuska	Day 28	Day 42	Evicted
15	Dipendu	Day 1	Day 38	Evicted By Housemates
16	Sohini	Day 1	Day 28	Evicted
17	Sayak	Day 1	Day 21	Evicted
18	Alexandra	Day 1	Day 20	Evicted
19	Joyita	Day 1	Day 14	Evicted
20	Anindya	Day 1	Day 6	Walked

== Housemates ==
The following housemates entered the house in order:

=== Original entrants ===
- Monami Ghosh - Film and television actress. She is most known for her roles in the soap operas Binni Dhaner Khoi, Punyi Pukur and Irabotir Chupkotha.
- Bharat Kaul - Actor. He is known for his antagonist roles in films and soap operas.
- Durnibar Saha - Singer known for Sa Re Ga Ma Pa - 2015
- Sohini Paul - Actress. She is the daughter of Tapas Paul.
- Niranjan Mondal aka Laughtersane - Content creator and known for his role as Chirayu Talukdar in Birangana.
- Nandini Dutta - Actress. She is known for the soap operas Ram Krishnaa, Dui Shalik and Kone Dekha Alo.
- Dipendu Biswas - Former footballer and former member of the West Bengal Legislative Assembly.
- Tanushree Roy Das - Entrepreneur known for her saree business.
- Anindya Sengupta - Actor. He is known for his roles in Paanch Phoron, Hostel Days, X=Prem, Kadak Singh, Oti Uttam and Bibi Payra.
- Sayak Chakraborty - Actor and influencer. He is best known for his role in the soap opera Karunamoyee Rani Rashmoni
- Joyita Chatterjee - Actress. She has appeared in London Dreams, Baal Veer, Class of 2020 and The Perfect Cover.
- Alexandra Taylor - British actress of Irish descent. She has appeared in Ogo Bideshini, Bagha Jatin, Abar Proloy, Jazz City.
- Srijla Guha - Actress. She is most known for her role as Priyadarshini aka Pihu in Mon Phagun.
- Jhilam Gupta - Content creator.
- Sonamoni Saha - Television actress. She is best known for the daily television shows Debi Chowdhurani, Mohor and Shubho Bibaho.

=== Wild card entrants ===
- Rajveer Dey - Actor, model and reality television personality. He is known for MTV Roadies 19
- Jeetu Kamal - Actor. He is most known for his roles in soap operas Raage Anuraage, Milon Tithi and Chirodini Tumi Je Amar.
- Anuska Ghosh - Reality television personality known for MTV Splitsvilla 16
- Sourav Das - Actor and reality show host He is known for his roles in Maa....Tomay Chara Ghum Ashena, Raage Anuraage, Punyi Pukur, Bolo Dugga Maiki, Montu Pilot, Picasso, Paashbalish.
- Ranieeta Dash - Actress known for her roles in Dhonni Meye, Ishti Kutum and O Mor Dorodiya

== Twists ==
=== Dugout ===
On Day 1, a new area Dugout was introduced inside the house. Housemates were chosen on different occasions via different methods to be sent to Dugout from the main house. On Day 8, the area was closed.

	Day 1	Day 2	Day 4	Day 7	Day 8
	Captain's vote	Housemates' vote	Votes over luxury budget task	—N/a	Closed
Alexandra	Main House				Closed
Bharat	Main House				Closed
Dipendu	Dugout				Closed
Durnibar	Dugout		Main House		Closed
Jhilam	Dugout				Closed
Joyita	Main House	Dugout			Closed
Monami	Main House		Dugout		Closed
Nandini	Main House				Closed
Niranjan	Main House				Closed
Rajveer				Main House	Closed
Sayak	Main House				Closed
Sohini	Main House	Dugout	Main House		Closed
Sonamoni	Main House				Closed
Srijla	Main House				Closed
Tanushree	Dugout				Closed
Anindya	Main House		Dugout		Closed

=== Hero Xoommate ===
The concept of Hero Xoommate of the week was introduced in Week 3. The Captain would choose a contestant for the title every week based on specific criteria, who would receive a gift hamper.

	Week 1	Week 2	Week 3	Week 4	Week 5	Week 6	Week 7	Week 8	Week 9	Week 10	Week 11	Week 12
Captain	Bharat	Sohini	Sonamoni	Tanushree	Tanushree (Previous Captain)	Niranjan	Niranjan	Niranjan (Previous Captain)	Niranjan	Sourav		
Xoommate	Not Introduced		Jeetu	Sonamoni	Bharat	Jhilam	Rajveer	Monami	Ranieeta	Niranjan	Durnibar	
Criteria	Not Introduced		Energy & Eloquence	Balance & Confidence	Style & Flare	Bravery	Energy & Eloquence	Balance & Confidence		Style & Flare	Bravery	

=== Bigg Bomb ===
On Day 21, the first Bigg Boss Game Changer was introduced chosen among commoners via JioHotstar poll. The Game Changer of the week had the power to drop a Bigg Bomb on a contestant every weekend.

	Week 1	Week 2	Week 3	Week 4	Week 5	Week 6	Week 7	Week 8	Week 9	Week 10	Week 11	Week 12	Week 13
Game Changer	None		Ariyan Charavarty	Prabir Kumar Mukherjee	Dr. Shaoli Dutta Roy		Bidisha Chatterjee	Koushik Ganguly	Atashi Das	Arpita Saspal	Ashok Debnath	Pulok Majumdar	
Bombed	None		Jhilam	Nandini	Sonamoni	Monami	Niranjan	Sourav	Ranieeta	Durnibar	Rajveer	Jeetu and Monami	
Bomb	None		Clean dishes after breakfast for week 4	Cooking breakfast without help for Week 5	Give ginger water to Rajveer for Week 6	Prepare a dance performance with all for Week 7	Tell bitter truth to contestants for Week 8	Perform commentary for Week 9	Mimic housemates for Week 10	Act as a teacher for Week 11	Teach martial arts	Swap roles with each other	

=== Bigg Star ===
On Day 56, host Sourav Ganguly introduced Bigg Star as a reward to a housemate, excluding the Captain, for their performance. The rewarded housemate would receive an immunity to be safe from nomination.

	Week 1	Week 2	Week 3	Week 4	Week 5	Week 6	Week 7	Week 8	Week 9	Week 10	Week 11	Week 12	Week 13	Week 14
Durnibar								—N/a	—N/a	—N/a	—N/a	—N/a	Duration Completed	
Jeetu								—N/a		—N/a	—N/a	—N/a	Duration Completed	
Monami								Captain	—N/a	—N/a		—N/a	Duration Completed	
Niranjan								—N/a	Captain	—N/a	—N/a	—N/a	Duration Completed	
Rajveer								—N/a	—N/a	—N/a	Captain	—N/a	Duration Completed	
Ranieeta								—N/a	—N/a	—N/a	—N/a	—N/a	Duration Completed	
Sourav								—N/a	Nominee	Captain	—N/a		Duration Completed	
Srijla								Nominee	—N/a		—N/a	—N/a	Duration Completed	
Tanushree								—N/a	—N/a	—N/a	—N/a	—N/a	Duration Completed	
Sonamoni									—N/a	—N/a	—N/a			
Nandini								—N/a	—N/a	—N/a				
Bharat														
Jhilam														
Anuska														
Dipendu														
Sohini														
Sayak														
Alexandra														
Joyita														
Anindya														

=== Connection Week ===
In Week 11, connections of the housemates entered the House in turns. Additionally, connections were asked to choose a contender for the next captaincy.
The following connections entered the House in order:

Day Entered	Housemate	Connection Name	Connection	Chosen Contender
Day 72	Srijla	Lima	Cousin	Jeetu
Day 72	Sonamoni	Nibha	Mother	Sonamoni
Day 72	Durnibar	Dalia	Mother	Rajveer
Day 73	Jeetu	Tuku	Mother	Srijla
Day 73	Niranjan	Mainak	Boyfriend	Niranjan
Day 73	Monami	Tamasha	Mother	Jeetu
Day 73	Tanushree	Tanupriya	Daughter	Tanushree
Day 74	Ranieeta	Mamata	Mother	Ranieeta
Day 74	Sourav	Darshana	Wife	Rajveer
Day 74	Rajveer	Rita	Mother	Durnibar

=== Ticket to Finale ===
In Week 12, housemates performed in the race to get the Ticket to Finale in multiple stages.

	Nomination	Ring Fight	Sack Collection	Rickshaw
Jeetu	Safe	Safe	Safe	Winner
Sourav	Safe	Safe	Safe	Eliminated
Monami	Bigg Star	Safe	Eliminated	
Srijla	Safe	Safe	Eliminated	
Durnibar	Safe	Eliminated		
Rajveer	Captain	Eliminated		
Niranjan	Safe	Eliminated		
Tanushree	Eliminated			
Ranieeta	Eliminated			

== Weekly summary ==
Week 1	Entrances	During the grand premier, host Sourav Ganguly introduced 15 contestants. Monami, Bharat, Sohini, Durnibar, Sohini, Niranjan, Nandini, Dipendu, Tanushree, Anindya, Sayak, Joyita, Alexandra, Srijla, and Sonamoni entered the house in order.; On Day 7, Rajveer Dey entered the House as the first wild card contestant.
Week 1	Nominations	On Day 2, safe housemates were asked to vote for two contestants to send to the dugout.; On Day 4, housemates from the main house and the dugout were asked to vote for the two most deserving and the least deserving members, respectively.
Week 1	House Captain	Bharat Kaul
Week 1	Captaincy	On Day 1, the housemates were asked to choose the captain by mutual decision. The contenders for the captaincy were Bharat, Monami, Nandini, Tanushree, Sayak, Srijla, and Sonamoni.: Housemate / Voted for / Housemate / Voted for; Alexandra / Bharat / Anindya / Monami; Bharat / Monami / Dipendu / Monami; Durnibar / Tanushree / Jhilam / Srijla; Joyita / Bharat / Monami / Bharat; Nandini / Monami / Niranjan / Bharat; Sayak / Nandini / Sohini / Srijla; Sonamoni / Bharat / Srijla / Tanushree; Tanushree / Sayak
Week 1	Tasks	On Day 1, Bharat was asked to send contestants to the dugout, whom he thinks are the least capable ones. He chose Durnibar, Dipendu, Tanushree, and Jhilam.; Luxury Budget Task: On Day 3 and Day 4, the housemates from the dugout were to perform in the luxury budget task under the supervision of the main house's contestants in different rounds. The most contributing players had a chance to get back to the main house.; Gopi vs Makhanchor Task: On the occasion of Janmashtami, the boys and the girls were divided into two groups, Gopis and Makhanchors, led by Sonamoni and Anindya. The Gopis were to make sweets and fill up the cups with butter in two stalls, while the Makhanchors would be giving the Gopis bangles and trying to steal their sweets. Additionally, a stick was provided in order to break the hanging pot in the end for victory. Whoever has the stick in the end would win the task.
Week 1	Results	Luxury Budget Task: Durnibar and Sohini returned to the main House, while Monami and Anindya were sent to dugout.; Gopi vs Makhanchor Task: Gopis won the task against Makhanchors.
Week 1	Exit	On Day 6, Anindya walked out of the House after he was given a choice.
Week 2	Entrances	On Day 14, Jeetu Kamal entered the house as the second wild card contestant.
Week 2	Nominations	Alexandra, Bharat, Dipendu, Durnibar, Joyita, and Srijla were nominated for the second-week eviction.
Week 2	House Captain	Sohini Paul
Week 2	Captaincy	Captaincy Task I: The garden area was turned into a village named Haloombari. The housemates were given particular roles to play in the village, with Rajveer (not eligible for captaincy) being the chief and Bharat, Nandini & Tanushree being the tigers. Every time the roaring sound came, Rajveer would have to give the key to a member who would unlock a tiger, and the tiger would kill that member, removing them from the captaincy. The most killing tiger would become a contender himself/herself at the end of the task.; Round / Tiger / Killed / Unlocked by; 1 / Nandini / Durnibar / Srijla; 2 / Bharat / Joyita / Joyita; 3 / Nandini / Monami / Srijla; 4 / Bharat / Sayak / Joyita; 5 / Nandini / Dipendu / Joyita; 6 / Tanushree / Sonamoni / Joyita; 7 / Tanushree / Jhilam; Niranjan / Joyita; At the end of the task, Alexandra, Nandini, Sohini, Srijla, and Tanushree became the final contenders for captaincy.: Captaincy Task II: Five contenders were given their boxes where they would have to collect balls falling in the form of hailstones. Other housemates could help the contenders collect the balls, and a contender could give balls to another contender as well.
Week 2	Tasks	Luxury Budget Task: Monami was given a secret task for the Luxury Budget. She would have to complete five missions to complete the task.; Sr. / Task; 1 / Showing emotional breakdown; 2 / Feeding a glass of turmeric milk; 3 / Applying makeup on Rajveer; 4 / Dancing for one minute with Jhilam; 5 / Pretending to lose something and blaming Durnibar; 6 / Writing opodartho (useless) on the washroom mirror
Week 2	Results	Captaincy Task: On Day 12, Sohini won the task and became the second captain.; Luxury Budget Task: Monami finished the task, and housemates were given 3000 points as currency to buy luxury items for the House.
Week 2	Exits	On Day 14, Joyita was evicted after facing public vote.
Week 3	Nominations	All the housemates except Sohini and Jeetu were nominated by Bigg Boss for eviction.; Rajveer was saved from nomination by Jeetu.; Bharat, Jhilam, Nandini, Sonamoni, and Tanushree were safe from nomination after the task.
Week 3	House Captain	Sohini Paul (till Day 16); Sonamoni Saha (since Day 16)
Week 3	Twist(s)	Game Changer: On Day 21, commoner Ariyan Charavarty, the Game Changer of the week, dropped a Bigg Bomb on Jhilam, assigning her for cleaning dishes after breakfast for week 4.
Week 3	Captaincy	Captaincy Task I: The safe contestants were assigned as robbers, while the nominated contestants were allotted as guards. The guards would protect the BB currency, and the robbers would steal it. After the ending buzzer, the robbers with the least amount of BB currency would get eliminated.; Robber / Currency / Robber / Currency; Bharat / 15700 / Sonamoni / 25600; Nandini / 17300 / Tanushree / 22600; Sohini / 13000 / Jhilam / 10600; Jeetu / 16400 / Rajveer / 0; Captaincy Task II: A crown was placed in the garden area to be stolen by the three robbers. Whoever possessed the crown till the end of the task would win the task and become the captain.
Week 3	Punishments	All the contestants were directly nominated for eviction by Bigg Boss due to breaking multiple rules, except for Sohini for being the Captain and Jeetu for being the newest wild card contestant.
Week 3	Tasks	Nomination Task: All the contestants except for Jeetu, Sohini, and Rajveer were handcuffed in pairs. Each pair was to come to a settlement to make one of them safe from the nomination. If they failed to do so, both contestants were to be nominated. Jeetu was assigned as the coordinator for the task.; Pair / Saved; Sayak and Nandini / Nandini; Dipendu and Jhilam / Jhilam; Alexandra and Srijla / —N/a; Bharat and Durnibar / Bharat; Monami and Sonamoni / Sonamoni; Niranjan and Tanushree / Tanushree; Luxury Budget Task: Housemates were divided into two groups—royal guards and commoners—with Monami as their queen. The guards and commoners would have to primarily please the queen. In the activity area, both teams would compete against each other with the queen as the judge. Overall, the winning team would win the task as well as access the Luxury Budget.; Activity Area Task: Team Guards / Team Commoners / Winning team; Sonamoni / Sohini / Guards; Jeetu / Rajveer / Guards; Sayak; Jhilam / Dipendu; Niranjan / Commoners; Alexandra; Sonamoni / Nandini; Srijla / Commoners; Durnibar; Alexandra; Jhilam / Bharat; Niranjan; Sohini / Guards
Week 3	Sponsored	Fortune Mustard Oil Task: Housemates were divided into two groups by Captain Sonamoni—Bharat, Monami, Jeetu, Srijla, Nandini, Rajveer & Sayak in Team Green and Alexandra, Dipendu, Durnibar, Jhilam, Niranjan, Sohini & Tanushree in Team Pink. The teams would have to collect fish of their color from the swimming pool. The team with more fish would win the task after the ending buzzer. Team Green caught 18 fish, while Team Pink caught 10. Team Green won the task and received hilsha fish and Fortune Mustard Oil.: Hero Xoommate: Captain Sonamoni was asked to choose a housemate who had been impressive throughout the week based on specific criteria. The criteria for the week were energy & eloquence.
Week 3	Results	Captaincy Task I: Nandini, Sonamoni, and Tanushree went on for the second task with the highest amounts of currency, while the others were eliminated.; Captaincy Task II: Sonamoni won the task, becoming the third captain of the House.; Luxury Budget Task: The Guards won the task and got 1400 points. The Queen got 600 points and an additional 500 points that she could give to anyone from any team if she wanted.; Hero Xoommate: Jeetu won the title for the week and received a gift hamper.
Week 3	Exits	On Day 20, Alexandra was evicted after facing public vote.; On Day 21, Sayak was evicted after facing public vote.
Week 4	Entrances	On Day 27, Srijla re-entered the House.
Week 4	Nominations	All housemates except Captain Sonamoni were nominated for eviction.
Week 4	House Captain	Sonamoni Saha (till Day 23); Tanushree Roy Das (since Day 23)
Week 4	Captaincy	Captaincy Task: Round I: Housemates were to play musical chair for selecting five contenders for captaincy. Jeetu, Monami, Rajveer, Srijla and Tanushree won the musical chair round and became eligible for the next round.; Round II: Five horses were added in the garden area for the contenders to sit. Other housemates would try to get the contenders off, except for pushing them off the horses or physically touching them. Rajveer got eliminated after Nandini pulled his horse, bringing him down. Srijla got injured in the knee due to falling after Nandini pulled her horse down and was taken to the medical center. Jeetu got off his horse to pull Monami off. At the end of the round, Tanushree and Monami became the final contenders for captaincy.; Votes: Since the task had two winners instead of one, Bigg Boss asked the housemates to vote between Tanushree and Monami to choose their next captain. All the housemates voted for Tanushree, except for Durnibar, Nandini and Rajveer who voted for Monami.
Week 4	Tasks	Nomination Task: Housemates were asked to rank themselves from 1 to 12, excluding Captain Sonamoni, where each position would be allotted to only one contestant. Since none between Srijla and Monami compromised for the first position, the task was cancelled and all the contestants were nominated for eviction.; Luxury Budget Task: Housemates were divided into two groups - Robots and Humans. The facilities of the House (bathroom, bedroom, kitchen) were under the Robots' control. Each Robot had a battery with three bars that would run out of energy within time. However, they would be able to gain energy from the Humans in exchange of giving them access to the facilities. Humans were to try draining the battery of all the Robots, while Robots would try to keep at least three of them alive.; Team Humans / Team Robots / Robot Status; Dipendu / Bharat / Alive; Durnibar / Jeetu / Dead; Jhilam / Monami / Alive; Nandini / Niranjan / Dead; Sonamoni / Rajveer / Alive; Tanushree / Sohini / Dead; Luxury Budget Penalty Task: Bigg Boss offered Luxury Budget items in exchange of Tanushree sacrificing her items.; Gang War: Housemates were to divide themselves into three groups and allot themselves for one of the three areas, except for Tanushree. Each group would raise complaints and argue against other groups. With the siren, they would steal the gold bars. By the end of the task, the group with the most bars would win and the least bars would be eliminated from the next captaincy task.; Garden Gang / Kitchen Gang / Bedroom Gang; Bharat / Jeetu / Dipendu; Bharat / Monami / Durnibar; Bharat / Monami / Jhilam; Bharat / Nandini / Niranjan; Bharat / Rajveer / Sohini; Bharat / Rajveer / Sonamoni; Total Bars: 0 / 24 / 16
Week 4	Sponsored	Hero Xoommate: Captain Tanushree was asked to choose a housemate who had been impressive throughout the week based on specific criteria. The criteria for the week were balance and confidence.
Week 4	Results	Captaincy Task: Tanushree won the task after housemates' vote and became the fourth captain.; Luxury Budget Task: The Robots won the task with Monami, Rajveer and Bharat alive by the end. However, Luxury Budget was cancelled due to some of the housemates' lack of enthusiasm.; Luxury Budget Penalty Task: Housemates received 6 kg chicken in exchange of Tanushree sacrificing 6 kg from her items.; Hero Xoommate: Sonamoni won the title for the week and received a gift hamper.; Gang War: Kitchen Gang won the task and the members became contenders for next captaincy, while all the members of Bedroom Gang were eliminated from captaincy.
Week 4	Exits	On Day 23, Srijla was hospitalized after she was injured during the Captaincy task.; On Day 28, Sohini was evicted after facing public vote.
Week 5	Nominations	Bharat, Durnibar, Nandini, Rajveer and Niranjan were nominated for eviction.
Week 5	House Captain	No Captain
Week 5	Captaincy	Captaincy Task: Canvases were placed in the garden area for each contenders, along with green paint. Contenders would protect their canvas while other housemates would try to paint them. In the end, the contender with the least paint in his/her canvas would win the task.
Week 5	Tasks	Luxury Budget Task: Eight housemates were divided into two political groups. Jeetu led one group Neel Horin (Blue Deer), followed by Monami, Nandini and Rajveer. Durnibar led the other group Agun Pakhi (Phoenix), followed by Anushka, Jhilam and Tanushree. Other housemates were allotted as the civilians with Bharat as the coordinator. Two groups would create their slogans and complaints, filling out their board wall. Additionally, the groups would solve jigsaw puzzles of their own and compete against each other. The final victory would be decided after the votes following a debate.; Voted for Agun Pakhi / Voted for Neel Horin; Durnibar / Jeetu; Dipendu / Jeetu; Jhilam / Rajveer; Tanushree / Rajveer; Niranjan / Monami; Srijla / Monami; Sonamoni / Nandini; Anushka / Nandini; Putul Khela (Doll Play): Every housemate would have a doll under their name. When the buzzer played, they would have to place a doll of one other housemate to Bigg Boss Putulbari. The last one to be placed would be eliminated. The last five contestants would become the contenders for next week's captaincy.; / Eliminated; Round 1 / Rajveer; Round 2 / Bharat; Round 3 / Anushka, Durnibar, Jhilam, Jeetu, Monami, Nandini
Week 5	Sponsored	Star Health Insurance Snake & Ladder: Durnibar, Niranjan and Rajveer were to play the game with Jhilam as the coordinator. If a player gets a ladder, he would get a lollipop as a reward and a bitter gourd shot as a punishment for snake. The winner would get a gym membership worth Rs 10000 while others would receive a membership worth Rs 5000.; Hero Xoommate: Previous Captain Tanushree was asked to choose a housemate who had been impressive throughout the week based on specific criteria. The criteria for the week were style & flare.; Fortune Soya Health Oil Fritters Contest: Two teams would compete against each other with Rajveer and Jeetu as the judges. Team A consisted of Dipendu, Jhilam, Sonamoni, Srijla and Tanushree while Team B consisted of Anushka, Bharat, Durnibar, Monami and Niranjan. The teams would cook fritters for the judges, focusing on taste, presentation and crunchiness.
Week 5	Results	Captaincy Task: Coordinator Bharat cancelled the task due to violation of rules.; Luxury Budget Task: Since one contestant voted twice instead of once, Bigg Boss cancelled the task and the Luxury Budget. However, after the poll on Saturday, Agun Pakhi won the task.; Star Health Insurance Snake & Ladder: Durnibar won the task and received the gym membership worth Rs 10000 while Rajveer and Niranjan received the membership worth Rs 5000.; Putul Khela (Doll Play): Dipendu, Niranjan, Sonamoni, Srijla and Tanushree became the contenders for next week's captaincy.; Hero Xoommate: Bharat won the title for the week and received a gift hamper.; Fortune Soya Health Oil Fritters Contest: Team A won the task and received Fortune Soya Health Oil.
Week 5	Exits	No eviction took place on Day 35.
Week 6	Nominations	Dipendu and Jhilam were directly nominated by Bigg Boss for their lack of participation.
Week 6	House Captain	Niranjan Mondal
Week 6	Captaincy	Captaincy Task: An arena was placed in the garden area. After the buzzer, the contenders would try to get each other out of the arena. After getting out thrice, a contender would be out of the game. Durnibar acted as the coordinator of the task. Srijla was given a choice to choose a proxy for her, but she chose to perform herself.; Contestant / Out in round / Status; Niranjan / 10 / Winner; Rajveer / 2, 4, 6 / Out; Sonamoni / 9, 11 / Out; Srijla / 5, 7, 8 / Out; Tanushree / 1, 3 / Withdrew
Week 6	Tasks	Complaint Task: Housemates were asked to write complaints about other housemates discreetly. Upon revelation, they would have to guess who wrote the complaint.; Complaint against / Written by / Complaint against / Written by; Srijla / Sonamoni / Bharat / Dipendu; Srijla / Bharat / Nandini / Monami; Rajveer / Jhilam / Srijla / Tanushree; Bharat / Srijla / Tanushree / Rajveer; Rajveer / Durnibar / Srijla / Anushka; Srijla / Niranjan / Monami / Nandini; Durnibar / Jeetu / Monami / Jeetu; Lockdown Task: The entire House except for the garden area was under lockdown, taking all the privileges from the housemates. Housemates would have to complete certain chores and tasks from time to time. Once they finished a certain amount of tasks, a certain privilege would be returned. In the meantime, BB coins would shower on the garden area which the housemates would have to collect for food.; Master & Servant Task: Housemates were divided in six pair with a master and a servant in each to determine the best and worst performer. Servants would obey their masters' commands, seek permission for everything and eat on banana leaves. In the end, masters and servants would rank each other.; Master / Servant / Master / Servant; Durnibar / Nandini / Anushka / Rajveer; Niranjan / Srijla / Jhilam / Sonamoni; Jeetu / Bharat / Tanushree / Monami; Rank / Servant / Rank / Master; 1 / Bharat / 1 / Jeetu; 2 / Rajveer / 2 / Tanushree; 3 / Sonamoni / 3 / Jhilam; 4 / Monami / 4 / Niranjan; 5 / Srijla / 5 / Durnibar; 6 / Nandini / 6 / Anushka; Secret Task: Captain Niranjan was given a secret task by Bigg Boss in which he would have to take an item from a member, five in total, and hide before the night ended without anyone noticing it.
Week 6	Sponsored	Hero Xoommate: Captain Niranjan was asked to choose a housemate who had been impressive throughout the week based on specific criteria. The criteria for the week was bravery.; AI Plus Nova 2 Power Entertainment Vlog Challenge : Selected pairs would make a 30 second vlog with mimicry. Niranjan acted as the judge for the task.
Week 6	Results	Captaincy Task: Niranjan won the task and became the captain.; Lockdown Task: All the tasks were successfully completed. Additionally, Rajveer became a contender for captaincy for possessing the most amount of coins among the non-contenders.; Hero Xoommate: Jhilam won the title for the week and received a gift hamper.; Master & Servant Task: Jeetu was ranked first among the masters and became a contender for next week's captaincy while Nandini was ranked last among the servants and was directly nominated for next week's nomination.; AI Plus Nova 2 Power Entertainment Vlog Challenge : Monami and Rajveer won the task and received AI Plus Nova 2 Power phones.
Week 6	Exits	On Day 38, Dipendu was evicted after facing housemates' votes.; On Day 42, Anushka was evicted after facing public vote.
Week 7	Entrances	On Day 48, Sourav Das and Raneeta Dash entered the House as wild card entrants.
Week 7	Nominations	Nandini was nominated as a result of previous week's performance ranking.; Jeetu, Rajveer, Durnibar, Srijla, Sonamoni, Jhilam and Tanushree were nominated for eviction via nomination task.
Week 7	House Captain	Niranjan Mondal (till Day 46); Durnibar Saha (since Day 47)
Week 7	Captaincy	Captaincy Task I: Housemates were divided into two groups: Team A with Durnibar, Niranjan, Srijla and Tanushree and Team B with Rajveer, Nandini, Sonamoni and Monami. The teams would have to save the balls of their names and snatch opponents' balls. If they managed to throw the ball into the basket, the housemate would get eliminated. Jeetu served as the coordinator while Bharat was eliminated prior to the task by Niranjan.; Round / Eliminated / Eliminated by; 1 / Nandini / Durnibar; 2 / Monami / Niranjan; 3 / Srijla / Rajveer; 4 / Niranjan / Rajveer; Captaincy Task II: Five pitchers were added in the garden area for each contender with a fence guarding them. With the buzzer, the would run to the fence and the first one to enter would get a chance to break someone else's pitcher. Monami acted as the coordinator of the task.; Round / Broken / Broken by; 1 / Jeetu / Rajveer; 2 / Tanushree / Durnibar; 3 / Rajveer / Rajveer; 4 / Sonamoni / Rajveer
Week 7	Tasks	Nomination Task: Contestants were called in the Confession room in trios where they would have to unanimously save one among them.; Contestants / / / Saved; Jeetu / Monami / Sonamoni / Monami; Durnibar / Jhilam / Tanushree / None; Bharat / Rajveer / Srijla / Bharat; Luxury Budget Task: Housemates were divided into three groups with three in each, except for Niranjan. Each human would have an Angel and a Devil. Whoever between the Angel and the Devil did the Human complete the task with would win the task along with the Human. The Devils were given a place in the activity area as their abode, where they would have to snatch food from the main House till the end of the task.; Team / Human / Angel / Devil; 1 / Srijla / Durnibar / Tanushree; 2 / Monami / Sonamoni / Bharat; 3 / Rajveer / Nandini / Jeetu; Tasks: Sr. / Angels / Devils / Criteria / Winner; 1 / Build pyramids with cups / Destroy the pyramids with balls / If two pyramids survive by the end, Angels win / Angels; 2 / Keep the sin bag empty / Fill the bag with sin bars / If there are 3 bars by the end, Devils win / Devils; 3 / Keep the cotton bowls safe / Contaminate the bowls with paint / If 2 bowls are safe by the end, Angels win / Devils; 4 / Help Humans collect diamonds in the maze / Prevent Humans from collecting diamonds / If 4 diamonds are collected by the end with rules, Angels win / Devils
Week 7	Sponsored	Fortune Oil Cooking Task: Rajveer and Nandini judged the housemates' cooking skills and declared the best cook according to them.; Hero Xoommate: Captain Niranjan was asked to choose a housemate who had been impressive throughout the week based on specific criteria. The criteria for the week were energy & eloquence.
Week 7	Results	Captaincy Task I: Durnibar, Rajveer, Sonamoni and Tanushree became contenders for captaincy.; Captaincy Task II: Durnibar won the task and became the captain.; Fortune Oil Cooking Task: Tanushree won the title and received a gift hamper.; Luxury Budget Task: The Devils won the task. However, Bigg Boss provided the Luxury Budget to all of them.; Hero Xoommate: Rajveer won the title for the week and received a gift hamper.
Week 7	Exits	On Day 43, Jhilam walked out of the House due to medical reasons.; On Day 49, no eviction took place.
Week 8	Nominations	Jeetu, Bharat, Sonamoni, Srijla, Tanushree and Monami were nominated by Sourav and Ranieeta.; Monami swapped her nomination with Nandini.
Week 8	Twists	On Day 56, Sourav Ganguly introduced Bigg Star as a reward to a housemate for their performance.
Week 8	Punishments	Rajveer was directly nominated by Bigg Boss for two consecutive weeks after he threw food items into the trash can.; Durnibar was suspended from captaincy and contendership for two consecutive weeks after his physical violence with Rajveer.
Week 8	House Captain	~~Durnibar Saha~~ (till Day 51); Monami Ghosh (since Day 54)
Week 8	Bigg Star	Sonamoni Saha
Week 8	Captaincy	Captaincy Task: The contenders were to collect the jewelries from the Activity Area with the first buzzer and put them on their assigned store in the Garden Area with the second buzzer. Each contender would choose a housemate as their guard for the shop. Other housemates could steal and gather jewelries in the shop that they preferred. Sonamoni acted as the coordinator for the task.; Contender / Guard / Points; Monami / Durnibar / 1510; Nandini / Rajveer / 895; Ranieeta / Sourav / 190
Week 8	Tasks	Thakur Bari Task: Housemates were given different roles with the task revolving around coins. Bharat would have to give coins to contestants based on the tasks. The three women among Srijla, Ranieeta, Monami and Nandini with the highest coin would become contenders for captaincy. One housemate, except for the four, would be able to immune themselves from nomination for a week from Week 9 to Week 12.; Family 1: Housemate / Role / Housemate / Role; Bharat / Zamindar / Tanushree / The Lady; Jeetu / Elder Son / Monami / Daughter-in-law; Rajveer / Younger son / Ranieeta / Daughter-in-law; Family 2: Housemate / Role / Housemate / Role; Durnibar / Brother / Sonamoni / Sister-in-law; Sourav / Nephew / Nandini / Niece-in-law; Srijla / NRI relative / Niranjan / Guest; Task / Family 1 / Family 2 / Winner; Find the hidden items from the attic and get Bharat sign the will / Rajveer and Jeetu / Durnibar and Sourav / Family 2; Eat as many momo and rolls as possible / Rajveer and Tanushree / Sonamoni and Sourav / Family 1; Housemate / Coins / Housemate / Coins; Ranieeta / 310 / Jeetu / 181; Sonamoni / 4 / Srijla / 177; Niranjan / 0 / Durnibar / 1803; Monami / 508 / Sourav / 1; Tanushree / 827 / Rajveer / 0; Nandini / 0 / Bharat / 410; Secret Task: Niranjan was given a secret task by Bigg Boss through Bharat during the Zamindar Task.; Sr / Task; 1 / Enrage anyone among Jeetu, Rajveer and Sourav; 2 / Spread a rumor about Ranieeta; 3 / Take 100 coins from a contestant
Week 8	Sponsored	Dazzler Style Task: Nine housemates were divided into three groups with each group having two models and a stylist and Bharat, Jeetu and Sourav as the judges.; Sr. / Models / Stylist / Theme; 1 / Durnibar Monami / Srijla / Ashtami Anjali; 2 / Tanushree Rajveer / Nandini / Navami night; 3 / Sonamoni Ranieeta / Niranjan / Dhashami Boron
Week 8	Results	Captaincy Task: Monami won the task and became the Captain.; Dazzler Style Task: Team 2 won the task and received a gift hamper.; Thakur Bari Task: Monami and Ranieeta became captaincy contenders for the week.; Durnibar got an immunity which he could use in Week 12.
Week 8	Exits	On Day 57, Bharat was evicted after facing public vote.
Week 9	Nominations	Nandini, Srijla and Tanushree were nominated for the ninth week eviction.; Rajveer's nomination continued for the week.
Week 9	House Captain	Monami Ghosh(till Day 60); Niranjan Mondal (since Day 60)
Week 9	Bigg Star	Jeetu Kamal
Week 9	Captaincy	Captaincy Task: a narrow stage was added to the Garden Area, where the contenders would face each other and try to get the opposite person off the stage. Every face-off would take place in three rounds.; Round / Contenders / Winner; 1 / Srijla / Niranjan; 1 / Niranjan / Niranjan; 2 / Nandini / Sourav; 2 / Sourav / Sourav; 3 / Sourav / Niranjan; 3 / Niranjan / Niranjan
Week 9	Tasks	Nomination Task: Captain Monami was given the power to choose five housemates who would have the power to nominate. She chose Sourav, Nandini, Sonamoni, Niranjan and herself.; Chosen / Housemate / Verdict; Sourav / Tanushree / Nominate; Nandini / Srijla / Save; Sonamoni / Nandini / Nominate; Niranjan / Durnibar / Save; Monami / Srijla / Nominate; Captaincy Contendership Task: Housemates were provided a sock for each, which they would have to keep wearing to become contenders while removing others'. The ten housemates would compete in two rounds (five in each), and the last four surviving ones (two in each) would become contenders for captaincy. Durnibar being exempted from captaincy acted as the coordinator.; Round / Eliminated / / / Winners; 1 / Monami / Sonamoni / Ranieeta / Srijla; 1 / Monami / Sonamoni / Ranieeta / Sourav; 2 / Tanushree / Rajveer / Jeetu / Nandini; 2 / Tanushree / Rajveer / Jeetu / Niranjan; Luxury Budget Task I: The Garden Area was transformed into a base camp where Jeetu was the chief commander with two groups under him. Group members would perform tasks under Jeetu who would give stars to the groups or take them back according to the performances and obedience.; Team / Captain / Members / / Stars; Blue / Srijla / Nandini / Sourav; Blue / Srijla / Monami / Sonamoni; Red / Niranjan / Ranieeta / Rajveer; Red / Niranjan / Durnibar / Tanushree; Luxury Budget Task II: Nandini, Niranjan, Sourav and Sonamoni were locked in chairs in the garden area. Coordinator Srijla would throw their keys into the pool where there were already other excess keys, and hang boards on the locked housemates which would contain lists of Luxury Budget items. Monami and Rajveer would dive into the pool and get the keys to unlock them (two at a time). By the end of the buzzer, the Luxury Budget items on the unlocked members' boards would be given to the housemates.; Locked Housemate / Status; Nandini / Unlocked; Niranjan / Unlocked; Sonamoni / Locked; Sourav / Unlocked
Week 9	Sponsored	Hero Xoom Situation Task: Housemates were divided into three groups to act out the given situations while Niranjan and Sonamoni acted as the judges.; Group / Members / / / Situation; 1 / Durnibar / Ranieeta / Tanushree / Get a ride from a cheapskate friend; 2 / Rajveer / Nandini / Srijla / Allure a friend for a Goa trip; 3 / Jeetu / Monami / Sourav / Convince your crush for a ride; Comfort Freshness task: Sonamoni and Niranjan competed against Monami and Sourav to identify the Comfort Fresh t-shirt and fill up a bucket with flowers tackling obstacles.
Week 9	Results	Captaincy contendership task: Srijla and Sourav won in Round 1 and Nandini and Niranjan won in Round 2, becoming contenders for captaincy.; Luxury budget task I: Team Blue won the task. However, both teams were provided the Luxury Budget.; Luxury budget task II: Nandini, Niranjan and Sourav were unlocked while Sonamoni remained locked.; Hero Xoom Situation task: Jeetu, Monami and Sourav won the task and received gift hampers.; Comfort Freshness task: Sonamoni and Niranjan won the task and received a gift hamper.
Week 9	Exits	On Day 63, Nandini was evicted after facing public vote but was sent to the Secret Room instead.
Week 10	Entrances	On Day 65, Nandini re-entered the House from the Secret Room.
Week 10	Nominations	Ranieeta, Srijla and Tanushree were nominated for the tenth eviction.; Rajveer's nomination continued for the week.
Week 10	House Captain	Sourav Das
Week 10	Rulers	Jeetu Kamal; Srijla Guha; Sourav Das
Week 10	Bigg Star	Srijla Guha
Week 10	Captaincy	Captaincy Task: Upon her return, Nandini was given a few powers among which included the power to select the Captain for the week and she chose Sourav.
Week 10	Rulership	Rulership Task: On Day 63, host Sourav Ganguly announced that three housemates would rule the House for Week 10 instead of one Captain. Jeetu, Srijla and Sourav performed as a team against Rajveer, Durnibar and Niranjan.
Week 10	Tasks	Nomination Task: Housemates were asked to put chili garlands on two housemates each to nominate. Jeetu, having Bigg Star and Rajveer, being directly nominated, were exempted from nomination but nominated others.; Halloween Task: Housemates were to perform tasks from time to time given by a fictional character, Julie.; Vampires vs Humans Task: Housemates were divided into two groups - Durnibar, Rajveer, Sonamoni, Sourav and Srijla as vampires and the rest as humans. The vampires would taunt and disturb the humans to get their attention, while the humans would have to constantly avoid them. Upon reaction, humans would turn into vampires.; Vampire vs Humans Task II: Vampires would fang the humans to turn them into vampires, while the humans would burn the bats to kill the vampires. By the end, the team with the most members would win the task. Monami acted as the coordinator for the task.; Secret Task: Nandini was given unrevealed power given by Bigg Boss upon her return on Day 65. On Day 66, she was given three cards to read in front of the housemates.
Week 10	Sponsored	Oshea Herbal Facial Session: Three male housemates were asked to choose three female housemates for a facial session.
Week 10	Results	Rulership Task: Jeetu, Srijla and Sourav won the task and became rulers for the week.; Captaincy Task: Sourav was appointed as the Captain by Nandini.; Vampire vs Humans Task I: Jeetu turned into a vampire upon his surrender.; Vampire vs Humans Task II: According to Monami, humans won the task. However, Bigg Boss announced that everyone would get the Luxury Budget.
Week 10	Exits	On Day 69, Nandini was ejected from the House for her physical abuse towards Rajveer.
Week 11	Nominations	Rajveer, Sonamoni and Tanushree were nominated for the eleventh week eviction.
Week 11	House Captain	Sourav Das (till Day 74); Rajveer Dey (since Day 74)
Week 11	Bigg Star	Monami Ghosh
Week 11	Captaincy	Captaincy Task: The Garden Area was transformed into a flower garden with podia for the contenders to make bouquet. Each contender would have to make five flower bouquets and submit to the owners cum coordinators Monami and Sourav for their approval.: Rounds / 1 / 2 / 3 / 4 / 5 / 6 / 7; Rajveer; Niranjan; Sonamoni / / / / / / / —N/a; Tanushree / / / / / / —N/a / —N/a; Ranieeta / / / / / —N/a / —N/a / —N/a; Srijla / / / / —N/a / —N/a / —N/a / —N/a; Jeetu / / / —N/a / —N/a / —N/a / —N/a / —N/a; Durnibar / / —N/a / —N/a / —N/a / —N/a / —N/a / —N/a
Week 11	Tasks	Nomination Task: All housemates except Srijla and Sourav were nominated by Bigg Boss, while Monami was nominated by Nandini. Upon the telephone calls, housemates had to fulfill the given tasks in order to get saved.; Nominated Housemate / Tasked Housemate / Task to save / Status; Niranjan / Jeetu / Shave beard / Saved; Tanushree / Sonamoni / Perform 50 pushups / Nominated; Sonamoni / Rajveer / Wax arms and legs / Nominated; Jeetu / Srijla / Cut hair to shoulder / Saved; Ranieeta / Niranjan / Burn the personal scrapbook / Saved; Rajveer / Tanushree / Reject daughter's message / Nominated; Monami / Ranieeta / Brush with fish sauce, vinegar, mustard sauce and raw egg mixture / Saved; Durnibar / Monami / Dye hair blue on one side / Saved; Luxury Budget Task: Housemates were to perform their activities upon instructions by Bigg Boss (play,pause, rewind, fast forward). Additionally, housemates were to perform on the songs played.
Week 11	Sponsored	Shalimar Champi Session: Jeetu and Rajveer were asked to massage to female housemates' hair as a part of the task. They chose Monami and Sonamoni, respectively.
Week 11	Results	Captaincy Task: Rajveer won the task and became the Captain for the week.; Luxury Budget Task: Bigg Boss cancelled the Luxury Budget due to housemates violating task rules.
Week 11	Exits	On Day 77, Sonamoni was evicted after facing public vote.
Week 12	Nominations	Ranieeta and Tanushree were nominated for the twelfth-week eviction.
Week 12	House Captain	Rajveer Dey (till Day 82)
Week 12	Captaincy	Captaincy Contendership Task: Captaincy Contendership Task I: Housemates were to pass the plates in front of them clockwise and then anticlockwise. Afterwards, they would open the lid and read out the envelopes to reveal who the contenders were.; Captaincy Contendership Task II: Housemates would have to fill the glasses of a contender with green liquid who they thought was not capable of being the Captain. Two contenders with the most amount of liquid would be eliminated after the round.; Captaincy Task: Contenders would have to collect flags from different sections of the House according to the buzzer. By the end, the contender with the most flags would become the last Captain. Srijla acted as the coordinator for the task.
Week 12	Bigg Star	Sourav Das
Week 12	Tasks	Nomination Task: Housemates except Rajveer, Durnibar and Monami participated in the nomination task where they would have to stand on a ramp. Safe and eliminated housemates would tease the participants to get them off the ramp. The nominated housemates were eliminated from the race to Ticket to Finale.; Sr. / Eliminated / Status; 01 / Ranieeta / Nominated; 02 / Tanushree / Nominated; 03 / Jeetu / Eliminated; 04 / Srijla / Safe; 05 / Niranjan / Safe; 06 / Sourav / Safe
Week 12	Ticket to Finale Task	Task I: Candidates were given a hundred coins each, which they would use to bid for briefcases in the Activity Area.; / Briefcase No.; / 05 / 01 / 06 / 03 / 04 / 07 / 02; Durnibar / 50 / —N/a / 20 / 40 / —N/a / 50 / —N/a; Jeetu / —N/a / 60 / —N/a / —N/a / —N/a / —N/a / —N/a; Monami / 40 / 40 / —N/a / 30 / 30 / —N/a / 100; Niranjan / 10 / 30 / 40 / 10 / 20 / —N/a / —N/a; Rajveer / 20 / 20 / 30 / —N/a / 10 / 30 / —N/a; Sourav / —N/a / —N/a / 10 / 50 / —N/a / 40 / —N/a; Srijla / 30 / 50 / 50 / 20 / 40 / 10 / —N/a; Advantage/Disadvantage: 01 / Freeze for a moment during the task; 02 / Deduct a housemate's advantage; 03 / Get help from another housemate during the task; 04 / ~~Swap places with another housemate during the task~~; 05 / Stop a contender from performing for two minutes; 06 / Get extra two minutes after the task; 07 / Get a chance to start the task two minutes earlier; Task II: Contenders would stand in a ring in the Garden Area with the pillars of their own picture-boxes. They had to break others' pillars' boxes while saving their own. The three contenders with the fewest boxes would be eliminated. Durnibar, Jeetu and Srijla used their advantage/disadvantage cards. Durnibar could break two boxes per contender for his power, Jeetu would be frozen for one minute as his disadvantage and Srijla would get the extra minutes if three contenders were eliminated by the end.; Task III: Contenders would have to collect sacks and gather in their own godowns shipping through a path of lava. Additionally, they would have to throw and destroy other contenders' sacks. The two contenders with the most sacks would proceed to the next stage.; Task IV: Jeetu and Sourav would have to sit on a rickshaw and stay on their seat as long as possible. The first one to get off the rickshaw would lose the task.
Week 12	Sponsored	AsianPaints Protection Task: Housemates were divided into two groups - Jeetu, Rajveer, Srijla and Tanushree in one and Durnibar, Monami, Ranieeta and Sourav in the other. The teams would have to protect their wall from attacking balls and attack the opponent's wall in turns. The team with a more protected wall would win the task. Niranjan acted as the coordinator for the task.
Week 12	Results	Nomination Task: Ranieeta and Tanushree were nominated as well as eliminated from the race to Ticket to Finale.; Ticket to Finale Task: Task II: Niranjan, Rajveer and Durnibar were eliminated from the race, respectively.; Task III: Srijla and Monami got eliminated, while Jeetu and Sourav entered the next stage.; Task IV: Jeetu won the task and received the Ticket to Finale.; Captaincy Contendership Task: Captaincy Contendership Task I: Niranjan, Rajveer, Ranieeta, Sourav, Srijla and Tanushree became contenders, while Durnibar, Jeetu and Monami were out of the competition.; Captaincy Contendership Task II: Srijla and Tanushree were eliminated.; Captaincy Task: The task was cancelled due to physical violence.; AsianPaints Protection Task: Jeetu, Rajveer, Srijla and Tanushree won the task and received a gift hamper.
Week 12	Exits	On Day 84, Ranieeta was evicted after facing public vote.
Week 13	Nominations	
Week 13	House Captain	No Captain
Week 13	Captaincy	—N/a
Week 13	Tasks	
Week 13	Sponsored	
Week 13	Results	
Week 13	Exits	
Week 14	Nominations	
Week 14	House Captain	No Captain
Week 14	Captaincy	—N/a
Week 14	Tasks	
Week 14	Sponsored	
Week 14	Results	
Week 14	Exits	

== Nominations table ==
	Week 1		Week 2		Week 3		Week 4		Week 5		Week 6		Week 7		Week 8		Week 9			Week 10	Week 11		Week 12					Week 13	Week 14
	Day 1	Day 2	Day 8	Day 12	Day 15	Day 16	Day 22	Day 23	Day 29	Day 32	Day 38		Day 44	Day 47	Day 50	Day 54	Day 57	Day 60	Day 63	Week 10	Day 71	Day 75	Day 78	Day 79	Day 80	Day 81	Day 82	Week 13	Week 14
Nominees for House Captain	Bharat; Monami; Nandini; Tanushree; Sayak; Srijla; Sonamoni		None	Alexandra; Nandini; Sohini; Srijla; Tanushree	None	Bharat; Jeetu; Jhilam; Nandini; Rajveer; Sohini; Sonamoni; Tanushree	None	~~Jeetu~~; Monami; ~~Rajveer~~; ~~Srijla~~; Tanushree	Jeetu; Monami; Nandini; Rajveer; Tanushree		~~Dipendu~~; Niranjan; Rajveer; Sonamoni; Srijla; Tanushree		Jeetu; Durnibar; Rajveer; Sonamoni; Tanushree		Nandini; Monami; Ranieeta		Nandini; Niranjan; Sourav; Srijla		None			Jeetu; Sonamoni; Rajveer; Srijla; Niranjan; Tanushree; Ranieeta; Durnibar	None				Niranjan; Rajveer; Ranieeta; Sourav; ~~Srijla~~; ~~Tanushree~~	None	
House; Captain	Bharat			Sohini		Sonamoni		Tanushree		None	Niranjan			~~Durnibar~~		Monami		Niranjan			Sourav	Rajveer					None	None	
Captain's Nomination	Durnibar; Dipendu; Tanushree; Jhilam (Dugout)	Joyita; Alexandra (Dugout)	Durnibar; Joyita	None					Rajveer; Durnibar	None	None		Bharat (eliminate from captaincy)	None			Srijla	None		Srijla; Tanushree	None								
Nominees for Rulers	None																		Jeetu; Sourav; Srijla; Durnibar; Niranjan; Rajveer		None								
Rulers	None																		Jeetu; Sourav; Srijla		None								
Bigg Star Nominees	Not Introduced														Monami; Sonamoni; Srijla		Jeetu; Sourav			None								None	
Bigg Star	Not Introduced														Sonamoni		Jeetu			Srijla	Monami		Sourav					None	
Vote to:	Captaincy	Dugout	Evict		Save		None		Evict		Save	Evict	Save		Evict						Save		None	Ticket to Finale			Captaincy		
Durnibar	Tanushree	Not Eligible	Joyita; Bharat		Nominated		Nominated		Nandini; Bharat		Dipendu	Nandini; Tanushree	Nominated	House; Captain		Safe	Not Eligible		Lost	Tanushree; Ranieeta	~~Nominated~~		Safe	Eliminated			Not Eligible		
Jeetu	Not in House				Rajveer		Nominated		Durnibar; Dipendu		Jhilam	Durnibar; Anushka	Nominated		Not Eligible				Ruler	Tanushree; Ranieeta	~~Nominated~~		Safe	Safe	Safe	Finalist			
Monami	Bharat	Sohini; Anindya	Alexandra; Srijla		Nominated		Nominated		Niranjan; Sonamoni		Jhilam	Bharat; Niranjan	~~Nominated~~		Nandini	House; Captain		Safe	Not Eligible	Srijla; Ranieeta	~~Nominated~~		Safe	Safe	Eliminated		Not Eligible		
Niranjan	Bharat	Joyita; Sonamoni	Nandini; Joyita		Nominated		Nominated		Nandini; Bharat		Jhilam	Srijla; Anushka	House Captain	Safe	Not Eligible		Durnibar (to save)	House Captain	Lost	House; Captain	~~Nominated~~		Safe	Eliminated			Contender		
Rajveer	Not in House		Dipendu		~~Nominated~~		Nominated		Bharat; Jhilam		Jhilam	Srijla; Monami	Nominated		Not Eligible		Nominated		Lost	Ranieeta; Sourav	Nominated	House; Captain		Eliminated			Contender		
Sourav	Not in House														Jeetu; Bharat; Sonamoni		Tanushree		Ruler	Srijla; Monami	House; Captain	Safe	Safe	Safe	Safe	Eliminated	Contender		
Srijla	Tanushree	Joyita; Alexandra	Joyita; Alexandra		Nominated		Nominated	Walked	Nandini; Monami		Dipendu	Nandini; Bharat	Nominated		Not Eligible				Ruler	Sonamoni; Monami	Safe		Safe	Safe	Eliminated		~~Contender~~		
Tanushree	Sayak	Not; Eligible	Joyita; Durnibar		~~Nominated~~		Nominated		House; Captain	Safe	Jhilam	Durnibar; Srijla	Nominated		Not Eligible					Ranieeta; Srijla	Nominated		Nominated				~~Contender~~		
Ranieeta	Not in House														Srijla; Tanushree; ~~Monami~~		Not Eligible			Tanushree; Srijla	~~Nominated~~		Nominated				Contender	Evicted (Day 84)	
Sonamoni	Bharat	Joyita; Niranjan	Joyita; Durnibar		~~Nominated~~	House; Captain			Rajveer; Nandini		Jhilam	Anushka; Srijla	Nominated		Not Eligible		Nandini		Not Eligible	Srijla; Tanushree	Nominated		Evicted (Day 77)						
Nandini	Monami	Sohini; Alexandra	Alexandra; Durnibar		~~Nominated~~		Nominated		Niranjan; Durnibar		Jhilam	Durnibar; Jhilam	Nominated		Not Eligible		Srijla (to save)		Not Eligible	Secret Room (Day 63 -Day 65)	Ejected (Day 69)								
Bharat	Monami	Joyita; Alexandra	House; Captain	Safe	~~Nominated~~		Nominated		Durnibar; Rajveer		Jhilam	Srijla; Durnibar	~~Nominated~~		Not Eligible		Evicted (Day 56)												
Jhilam	Srijla	Not; Eligible	Bharat; Joyita		~~Nominated~~		Nominated		Rajveer; Nandini		Nominated	Rajveer; Durnibar	Nominated	Walked (Day 43)															
Anushka	Not in House								Nandini; Bharat		Dipendu	Jhilam; Niranjan	Evicted (Day 42)																
Dipendu	Monami	Not; Eligible	Joyita; Bharat		Nominated		Nominated		Rajveer; Bharat		Nominated	Evicted by Housemates (Day 38)																	
Sohini	Srijla	Joyita; Sayak	Srijla; Durnibar	House; Captain		Safe	Nominated		Evicted (Day 28)																				
Sayak	Nandini	Joyita; Sohini	Joyita; Alexandra		Nominated		Evicted (Day 21)																						
Alexandra	Bharat	Sayak; Nandini	Nandini; Durnibar		Nominated		Evicted (Day 20)																						
Joyita	Bharat	Sohini; Srijla	Srijla; Tanushree		Evicted (Day 14)																								
Anindya	Monami	Joyita; Niranjan	Walked (Day 6)																										
Notes	1		2		3		4, 5		6, 7		8		9		10, 11, 12, 13, 14		15, 16			17	18		19						
Against Public Vote	None		Alexandra; Bharat; Dipendu; Durnibar; Joyita; Srijla		Alexandra; Dipendu; Durnibar; Monami; Niranjan; Sayak; Srijla		Bharat; Dipendu; Durnibar; Jeetu; Jhilam; Monami; Nandini; Niranjan; Rajveer; Sohini; Srijla; Tanushree		Bharat; Durnibar; Nandini; Niranjan; Rajveer		Dipendu; Jhilam Anushka; Bharat; Durnibar; Jhilam; Nandini; Niranjan; Srijla		Durnibar; Jeetu; ~~Jhilam~~; Nandini; Rajveer; Sonamoni; Srijla; Tanushree		Jeetu; Bharat; Sonamoni; Srijla; Tanushree; ~~Monami~~; Nandini; Rajveer		Nandini; Rajveer; Srijla; Tanushree			Rajveer; Ranieeta; Srijla; Tanushree	~~Monami~~; Rajveer; Sonamoni; Tanushree		Ranieeta; Tanushree						
Re-entered	None						Srijla		None											Nandini	None								
Secret Room	None																			Nandini	None								
Walked	Anindya		None				Srijla		None				Jhilam		None														
Ejected	None																			Nandini	None								
Evicted	None		Joyita		Alexandra		Sohini		None		Dipendu		None		Bharat		~~Nandini~~			None	Sonamoni								
Evicted	None		Joyita		Sayak		Sohini		None		Anushka		None		Bharat		~~Nandini~~			None	Sonamoni								

indicates that the Housemate was directly nominated for eviction.
indicates that the Housemate was immune prior to nominations.
indicates the contestant has been evicted.
indicates the contestant walked out due to emergency.
indicates the contestant has been ejected.
indicates the House Captain.
indicates the Rulers.
indicates the housemate was immune due to having Bigg Star.

=== Notes ===
- ^1: On Day 6, Sourav offered Anindya to walk out of the House.
- ^2 Dipendu was directly nominated by Rajveer for eviction.
- ^3 All the contestants except for Sohini and Jeetu were nominated by Bigg Boss for breaking house rules.
- ^4 Srijla got injured during the captaincy task and was taken to the medical center.
- ^5 Jeetu, Monami, Nandini and Rajveer won the Gang War task and became contenders for Week 5's captaincy.
- ^6 Jeetu was saved from nomination by Anushka and Srijla was exempted from nomination.
- ^7 Dipendu, Niranjan, Sonamoni, Srijla and Tanushree won the Putul Khela task and became contenders for Week 6's captaincy.
- ^8 Dipendu and Jhilam were directly nominated by Bigg Boss for their lack of participation.
- ^9 Jeetu ranked first among the masters in Master & Servant Task and became contenders for next week's captaincy; Nandini ranked last among the servants and was directly nominated for next week's eviction.
- ^10 Nandini received direct contendership for Week 8's captaincy on Day 48, after being voted as the best Angel in task.
- ^11 Sourav and Ranieeta were given the power to nominate six housemates in total.
- ^12 Monami had the power to swap her nomination with another housemate and she chose Nandini.
- ^13 Rajveer was directly nominated by Bigg Boss for two consecutive weeks due to him wasting food.
- ^14 Durnibar was suspended from captaincy and contendership for two consecutive weeks after his physical violence with Rajveer.
- ^15 Upon her eviction, Nandini was sent to the Secret Room.
- ^ 16 Host Sourav announced that the House would have three rulers in Week 10 instead of one Captain and chose the contenders himself.
- ^17 On Day 66, Nandini selected Sourav as the new Captain following her power given by Bigg Boss.
- ^18 On Day 66, Nandini nominated Monami for Week 11 eviction following her power given by Bigg Boss.
- ^19 The captaincy task was cancelled by Bigg Boss due to physical violence.

== Guest appearances ==
Week	Day	Guest	Note(s)
Grand; Premier	Day 0	Harbhajan Singh	Opening guest
Week 3	Day 21	Ariyan Charavarty	Game Changer of the week
Week 4	Day 28	Soham Basu Roy Chowdhury & Mohana Maiti	To promote their show Ashirbad
Week 4	Day 28	Prabir Kumar Mukherjee	Game Changer of the week
Week 5	Day 35	Prosenjit Chatterjee	To promote television premier of Vijaynagar'er Hirey
Week 5	Day 35	Dr. Shaoli Dutta Roy	Game Changer of the week
Week 6	Day 41	Koushani Mukherjee, Shiboprosad Mukherjee & Noni Chora Das Baul	To promote Bohurupi: The Golden Daku
Week 6	Day 41	Amit Synghle	To launch Asianpaints Rangmahal
Week 6	Day 42	Srijit Mukherjee, Tota Roy Chowdhury & Divyani Mondal	To promote Emperor vs Sarat Chandra
Week 7	Day 49	Bidisha Chatterjee	Game Changer of the week
Week 7	Day 49	Mrinmoy Das aka CineBap & Akash Banerjee aka Bostir Chele Pocha	To interact with housemates
Week 8	Day 56	Koushik Ganguly	Game Changer of the week
Week 9	Day 63	Atashi Das	Game Changer of the week
Week 10	Day 69	Saheb Bhattacharya, Hiya Mukherjee, Adrit Roy and Anushka Das	To promote their shows Gangaa and Kumkum
Week 10	Day 70	Arpita Saspal	Game Changer of the week
Week 10	Day 70	Madhubanti Bagchi	To interact with housemates
Week 11	Day 76	Jisshu Sengupta	To interact with housemates
Week 11	Day 77	Sayan Bose and Dipanwita Rakshit	To promote their show Shudhu Tomari Jonyo
Week 11	Day 77	Ashok Debnath	Game Changer of the week
Week 12	Day 83	Trina Saha	To interact with housemates
Week 12	Day 84	Arkaprovo Roy and Shirin Paul	To promote their show Adorer Nouko
