= Anindya Sengupta (actor) =

Indian actor and sports commentator

- Born: 6 July 1988 (age 38)
- Occupations: Actor; Sports commentator
- Years active: 2016–present
- Known for: Hostel Days; X=Prem; Oti Uttam

Anindya Sengupta (born 6 July 1988) is an Indian actor who primarily works in Bengali cinema. He made his feature-film debut with X=Prem (2022), directed by Srijit Mukherji. He has subsequently appeared in films including Niharika: In the Mist (2023), Oti Uttam (2024), Tahader Katha (2024), Bramhaarjun (2025) and Bibi Payra (2026).

Sengupta has also worked in television and other streaming projects, including Paanch Phoron and Hostel Days. In addition to Bengali films and web series, he has also appeared in the Hindi film Kadak Singh (2023) and Bigg Boss Bangla (2026).

== Career ==
Sengupta graduated from the Rabindra Bharati University in theatre direction. After graduation, he started working as a radio jockey. In 2016, he appeared in a short film Udaan. He made his feature film debut with X=Prem (2022), directed by Srijit Mukherji. He received the Filmfare Awards Bangla for Best Debut Male at the 6th Filmfare Awards Bangla for his role in X=Prem.

In 2023, he appeared in the Aniruddha Roy Chowdhury directorial Kadak Singh. It marked his Hindi feature film debut. Later that year, he played the lead in Srijit Mukherji' Oti Uttam. He portrayed the role of a struggling actor whose life is transformed after encountering Uttam Kumar's spirit. Alongside his film work, Sengupta has also worked in streaming productions. He appeared in the Hoichoi anthology Paanch Phoron, before playing the lead character "OG" in the coming-of-age web series Hostel Days (2022). He also featured in the web series Kholam Kuchi.

In 2024, Sengupta starred in Tahader Katha, directed by debutant Subrata Ghosh. The following year, he appeared as the lead in Karon Greece Amader Desh Na Athoba Blue-Black O Transparent White, an independent drama film that earned critical acclaim at multiple film festivals.

Sengupta continued working in Bengali web productions with lead appearances in Hothat Dekha: Office (2023), Preme Pora Baron (2024) and Mishti Premer Crispy Golpo (2024), followed by Khujechi Toke Raat Berate (2025). He subsequently portrayed the titular character in Bramhaarjun (2025), directed by Souvik Dey. In 2026, he appeared in Bibi Payra.

Besides acting, Sengupta also works as a sports commentator in the Indian Premier League, in its Bengali-language broadcast. He was part of the Bengali studio panel in half-time discussions for selected matches during the 2022 FIFA World Cup. In 2025, he was part of the commentary team at the Salt Lake Stadium during Lionel Messi's 2025 tour of India in Kolkata. In 2026, Sengupta is a contestant on the Bengali reality show Bigg Boss Bangla season 3.

== Filmography ==
Year	Film	Role	Notes	Ref.
2021	Kalpavigyan: A Speculative Journey	Himself	The first documentary film on Bengali kalpavigyan; Premiered on 5 November 2021, at the Berlin Science Fiction Film Festival in Germany	
2022	X=Prem	Khilaat	Marked his feature film debut	
2023	Niharika: In The Mist	Rangan		
2023	Kadak Singh	Vikram	Hindi-language film; marked his Hindi feature film debut	
2024	Oti Uttam	Krishnendu		
2024	Tahader Katha	Anal		
2025	Karon Greece Amader Desh Na Athoba Blue-Black O Transparent White	Sudipto, a filmmaker	Film was screened at the Greece International Film Festival as an Honourable Mention	
2025	Bramhaarjun	Arjun		
2026	Bibi Payra	Debu		

== Television ==
Year	Title	Role	Notes
2026	Bigg Boss Bangla 3	Contestant	Walked (Day 6)

== Web series ==
Year	Title	Role	Platform	Notes	Ref.
2019	Paanch Phoron		Hoichoi	Anthology series; Marked his streaming production debut	
2022	Hostel Days	Orko a.k.a. OG	Hoichoi		
2022	Kholam Kuchi	Sourav	Uribaba		
2023	Hothat Dekha: Office	Siddhartha	Hoichoi	Hoichoi mini-series; Anthology series	
2024	Preme Pora Baron	Rono	Addatimes		
2024	Mishti Premer Crispy Golpo	Durbar Sengupta	Hoichoi	Hoichoi mini-series	
2025	Khujechi Toke Raat Berate	Subham	Addatimes		

== Accolades ==
Year	Award	Ceremony	Category	Work	Result	Ref.
2023	Filmfare Awards Bangla	6th Filmfare Awards Bangla	Best Debut Male	X=Prem	Won	
2023	WBFJA Awards	6th WBFJA Awards	Most Promising Actor	X=Prem	Nominated	
