= Kadak Singh =

2023 film by Aniruddha Roy Chowdhury

- Official release poster
- Directed by: Aniruddha Roy Chowdhury
- Written by: Ritesh Shah
- Story by: Viraf Sarkari; Ritesh Shah; Aniruddha Roy Chowdhury
- Produced by: Mahesh Ramanathan; Viraf Sarkari; Andre Timmins; Sabbas Joseph
- Starring: Pankaj Tripathi; Parvathy Thiruvothu; Sanjana Sanghi; Jaya Ahsan; Dilip Shankar; Jogi Mallang
- Cinematography: Avik Mukhopadhyay
- Edited by: Arghyakamal Mitra
- Music by: Shantanu Moitra
- Production companies: WIZ Films; KVN Productions; HT Content Studio; First Step Films; Opus Communications
- Distributed by: ZEE5
- Release date: 8 December 2023
- Running time: 128 minutes
- Country: India
- Language: Hindi

Kadak Singh is a 2023 Indian Hindi-language psychological thriller film directed by Aniruddha Roy Chowdhury and produced by WIZ Films along with KVN Productions. It has been produced by Viraf Sarkari and Mahesh Ramanathan. The film stars an ensemble cast including Pankaj Tripathi, Jaya Ahsan, Parvathy Thiruvothu and Sanjana Sanghi in prominent roles. This is the first Hindi film of Bangladeshi actress Jaya Ahsan. The film was released on 8 December 2023 on ZEE5. The film had its world premiere at the 54th International Film Festival of India on 22 November 2023.

== Premise ==
An officer of the Department of Financial Crimes is trying to solve a chit-fund scam case after being diagnosed with retrograde amnesia. He relies on listening to different perspectives on who he actually is and how he landed up in the hospital where he is being treated.

== Cast ==
- Pankaj Tripathi as Arun Kumar 'AK' Shrivastav alias "Kadak Singh"
- Sanjana Sanghi as Sakshi Shrivastav, AK's daughter
- Khushboo Kamal as Mimi Shrivastav, AK's deceased wife
- Parvathy Thiruvothu as Miss Mimi Kannan (Mimi Nurse)
- Jaya Ahsan as Noyona aka Naina, AK's "girlfriend"
- Paresh Pahuja as Arjun Shrivastav, AK's Colleague
- Varun Buddhadev as Aditya "Adi" Shrivastav, AK's "son"
- Dilip Shankar as Tyagi, AK's "boss"
- Anindya Sengupta as Vikram
- Jogi Mallang
- Sanjeev Sharma as Ashok Agarwal
- Rajan Modi as Subhash; AK's colleague

== Production ==
The shoot of the film started soon in December 2022 in Kolkata.and finish in February 2023.

== Marketing ==
The film's trailer was launched on 21 November 2023, at the 54th International Film Festival of India premiere. Talking about the reason behind choosing International Film Festival of India for the trailer launch, director Aniruddha Roy Chowdhury called the festival one of the most important global platform for movies.

The music of the film was released on November 30, 2023.

== Release ==
The rights of the film were sold to ZEE5. The director, Aniruddha Roy Chowdhury, revealed intentions of releasing theatrically after its streaming release.

== Reception ==
On the review aggregator website Rotten Tomatoes, 40% of 10 critics' reviews are positive, with an average rating of 5/10.

Reviews of the film noted Tripathi's performance. Sreeparna Sengupta of The Times of India rated it 3 out of 5 and commented, "the film has to its advantage seasoned actors like Pankaj Tripathi and Parvathy doing what they do best." Monika Rawal Kukreja of Hindustan Times wrote, "At 127 minutes, the film is crisp and doesn't seem dragged." Bhavana Sharma from Deccan Chronicle wrote, "The screenplay stands out as the film's strongest suit, with its non-linear storytelling that seamlessly shifts between past and present." Rishil Jogani of Pinkvilla rated the film 3 out of 5 while concluding, "its novel concept is a reason enough to watch it." A critic from Bollywood Hungama rated the film 2/5 stars and wrote, "Kadak Singh has a complicated and disappointing second half. The performances are the saving grace of this film."

== Music ==
Kadak Singh

Soundtrack album by Shantanu Moitra
- Released: 29 November 2023
- Genre: Feature film soundtrack
- Length: 17:13
- Language: Hindi
- Label: Zee Music Company

Shantanu Moitra chronology
12th Fail (2023)	Kadak Singh (2023)	Pradhan (2023)

Official audio
- Kadak Singh - Full Album on YouTube

The music for the film composed by Shantanu Moitra. Lyrics are written by Tanveer Ghazi.

No.	Title	Singer(S)	Length
1.	"Duniya Tu Shaatir Hae"	Pankaj Tripathi	2:53
2.	"Tu Jo Hai"	Shreya Ghoshal	4:43
3.	"Tu Jo Hai" (Male Version)	Papon	4:43
4.	"Aye Mere Dil"	Taba Chake	4:54
Total length:			17:13
