= Lionel Messi's 2025 tour of India =

Lionel Messi's G.O.A.T. India Tour 2025 was a promotional and fan engagement tour by Argentine footballer Lionel Messi across India during December 2025. As a celebration of Messi's status among the greatest football players of all time, the tour included public appearances, exhibition matches, community events, and cultural engagements in several major Indian cities. This was Messi's first visit to India since 2011.

The tour was overshadowed by a major crowd-control failure at its opening event in Kolkata, where Messi's appearance was abruptly cut short, leading to protests by fans, property damage inside the stadium, and police intervention, which drew media attention and prompted official investigations, including a public apology by the state's then Chief Minister Mamata Banerjee. According to organizers and police, inadequate crowd segregation, overselling of tickets, along with celebrities and their entourages with their own conflicting security details, severely restricted visibility and access for general ticket holders.

== Background ==
Lionel Messi, an eight-time Ballon d'Or winner and 2022 FIFA World Cup champion, embarked on the India leg of his global G.O.A.T. (Greatest Of All Time) tour following his club commitments and international competitions. The India tour was designed to connect with Indian football supporters and included a series of public events, fan meets, and football clinics across multiple cities. On 12 December 2025, Messi arrived at Kolkata Airport.

== Itinerary ==
The tour itinerary included stops in:

- Kolkata, West Bengal - Salt Lake Stadium
- Hyderabad, Telangana (replaced Ahmedabad)
- Mumbai, Maharashtra
- New Delhi, National Capital Territory

At each venue, Messi was scheduled to engage with fans, participate in exhibition matches, launch promotional campaigns, and support youth football initiatives.

== Kolkata ==
Unrest at Kolkata event
- Date: 13 December 2025
- Time: 11:15 am – 12:53 pm (IST)
- Location: Salt Lake Stadium, Kolkata, India
- Type: Crowd crush
- Cause: Overcrowding during celebrations
- Injuries: 17

=== Statue unveiling ===
Lionel Messi's visit to Kolkata featured the unveiling of a statue honoring his football career. On 13 December 2025, a 70-foot (21-metre) statue of Messi was unveiled at the Sree Bhumi Sporting Club in Lake Town, Kolkata, depicting Messi holding a FIFA World Cup trophy. Messi, along with Bollywood's Shah Rukh Khan attended the event from the stadium. The ceremony marked the start of the tour.

=== Opening event ===
The opening event of the tour took place at the Salt Lake Stadium in Kolkata on 13 December 2025. Thousands of fans gathered to see Messi, many of whom had purchased tickets at prices ranging up to ₹10,000 or more. Messi's planned appearance included a walk around the pitch and interactions with supporters. Messi arrived at the stadium at around 11:15 AM (IST) along with his teammates Luis Suárez and Rodrigo De Paul, but he was almost immediately swarmed by politicians, celebrities, photographers, and officials, causing a delay.

Soon, the public who were present in the stadium became frustrated, and some began vandalizing the stadium via ripping up the stadium's seats and throwing them onto the pitch, along with bottles and banners. Despite early intervention by local police, all chairs and banners were broken, as well as other equipment within the stadium. The event was ultimately cut short when Messi's lap and planned activities were abruptly reduced to around 20 minutes due to security concerns and organizational mismanagement. Many fans complained that they were unable to see Messi properly because of crowd congestion, celebrities and their entourages trying to override access with their own security details, led to rising frustration among ticket holders, which also included more restrictive areas than most events.

=== Crowd unrest ===
Following Messi's early departure, chaos erupted inside the stadium as the crowd protested. Fans reacted by ripping up seats, throwing water bottles and chairs, and invading portions of the pitch. Police used mild force to control the unrest and restore order.

=== Aftermath ===
Satadru Dutta, the chief organiser of the event, was detained by Kolkata police in connection with the mismanagement and ensuing unrest, and sent to 14 days in custody. The custody was then extended to 9 January 2026 on the 28th of December due to multiple additional charges being introduced by public prosecutors. Authorities announced plans to investigate the circumstances around the planning and execution of the event. West Bengal Chief Minister Mamata Banerjee publicly apologized to Messi and fans for the incident and ordered a detailed inquiry to assess responsibility and prevent similar failures at future events. Fans demanded that refunds should be offered to disappointed ticket holders who were unable to see Messi due to the disruption.

During the financial investigation, it was revealed that approximately ₹19 crore (approx. US$2.10 million) was collected from ticket sales alone. Authorities have frozen over ₹20 crore (approx. US$2.22 million) in Dutta's bank accounts. There are also allegations of corruption regarding food and beverage contracts, where Dutta received ₹60 lakh, but the actual food and beverage contract was of just ₹40 lakh.

The statue was removed in June 2026 due to wind instability. Authorities were looking for new locations to host the statue.

== Hyderabad ==
After the Kolkata incident, Messi continued the tour to Hyderabad, where a more orderly exhibition match and fan interaction occurred. Messi met local dignitaries and participated in football activities that drew positive responses from the crowd.

== Gujarat ==
On December 16, in Jamnagar, Gujarat, Messi visited Vantara which was Anant Ambani's wildlife conservation centre. He was welcomed with traditional Indian rituals and participated in multiple Hindu prayers and ceremonies. A lion cub was named "Lionel" in his honour.
