= Salt Lake Stadium =

Multipurpose international football stadium in Kolkata, West Bengal, India

Coordinates: 22.56899°N 88.40907°E

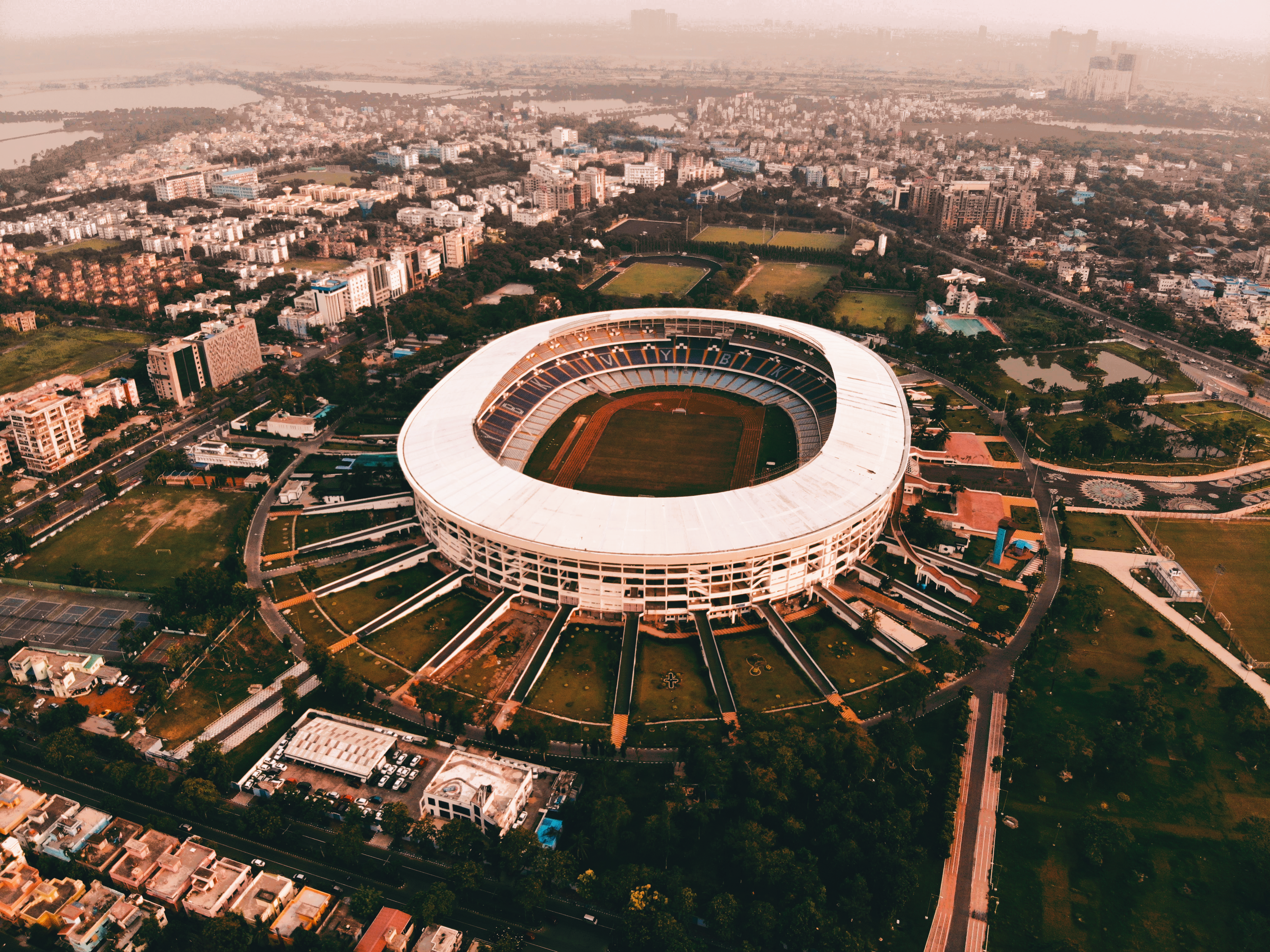
- Interactive map of Salt Lake Stadium
- Location: Bidhannagar, Greater Kolkata
- Owner: Government of West Bengal
- Operator: Department of Youth Services & Sports
- Capacity: 68,000 (2020–present) List: 77,269(2017–2020) 85,000 (2011–2017) 120,000 (1984–2011)
- Surface: Grass (1984–2011); Astro-turf (2011–2015); Bermuda grass (2015–present)
- Scoreboard: Yes (manual & digital)
- Record attendance: 131,781 (1997 Federation Cup semi-final)
- Field size: 110 m × 72 m (361 ft × 236 ft)
- Public transit: Salt Lake Stadium

Construction
- Opened: 25 January 1984; 42 years ago
- Renovated: 2011, 2014, 2016–2017
- Architects: M. S. Ballardie, Thompson & Matthews Pvt. Ltd. H. K. Sen & Associates

Tenants
- India national football team (1984–present); West Bengal football team (1984–present); East Bengal (1986–present); Mohun Bagan (1984–present); Mohammedan (1984–present)

The Salt Lake Stadium, Kolkata, also known as Vivekananda Yuba Bharati Krirangan (VYBK), is a multi-purpose stadium, used mostly for football matches, located in Salt Lake City, Greater Kolkata, with a capacity of 68,000 spectators. Named after Swami Vivekananda, the stadium is one of the home grounds of Mohun Bagan and East Bengal. The stadium hosted the final match of the 2017 FIFA U-17 World Cup, alongside other matches of the tournament.Prior to its renovation in 2011, the stadium's capacity was the highest in the world at 120,000. It was subsequently reduced to 85,000 before another renovation in 2017 reduced it to 67,000 .

The stadium switched back to natural grass from artificial turf, unveiled in a Kolkata Derby match between East Bengal and Mohun Bagan during the 2016 Calcutta Premier Division match.

== About ==
The stadium was established in 1984 because the club grounds in the Maidan area, each with capacity around 20,000, were proving too small for the huge crowd that occupied the grounds on matchdays. And while the Eden Gardens was there to handle some of the bigger games, like the Kolkata Derby, the pressure of handling both cricket and football was proving to be a bit too much for the stadium.

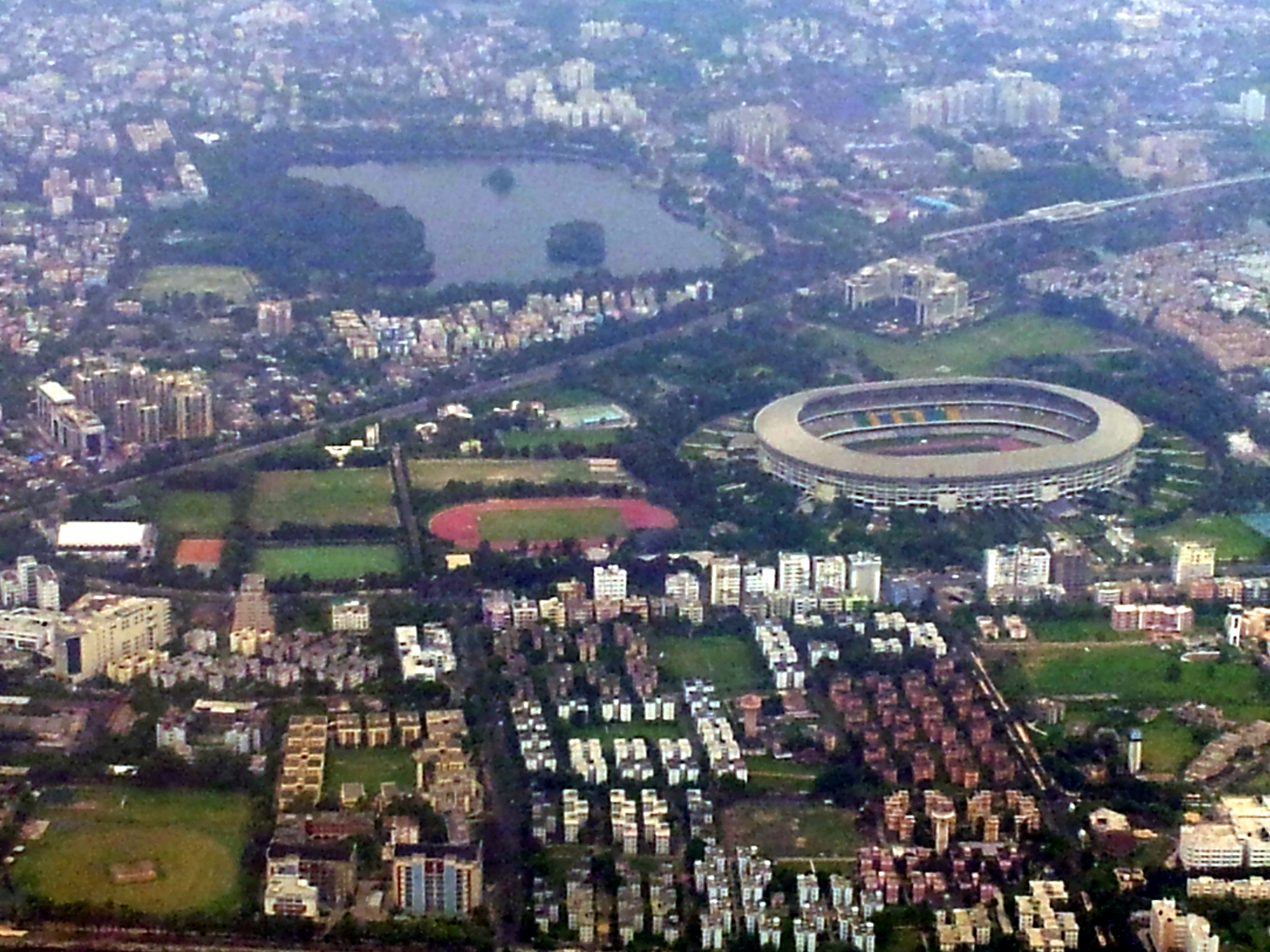
The stadium before renovation, an aerial view.

The stadium is situated approximately 10 kilometers to the east of the Greater Kolkata downtown. The roof is made of metal tubes and aluminum sheets and concrete. The stadium was inaugurated in January 1984. There are two electronic scoreboards and control rooms. There is illumination at night. There are special arrangements for TV broadcasting.

The stadium features three tiers of concrete galleries. The stadium has 9 entry gates and 30 ramps for the spectators to reach the viewing blocks. The nine gates include the VIP gate. Gates 1 and 2 are on Kadapara road, gate no.3, 3A, 4, 4A and 4B are on the side of Broadway; gate no 5 and the VIP gate are on the side of EM By pass. The ramps are inside the stadium and link the inner ring road to the different levels of the stadium complex.

The stadium covers an area of 76.40 acres (309,200 m^{2}). The stadium has a unique synthetic track for athletic meets. It has a main football arena measuring 105 by 70 metres (344 ft × 230 ft). It also houses electronics scoreboards, elevators, VIP enclosures, peripheral floodlighting arrangement from the roof-top, air-conditioned VIP rest room, conference hall and much more. The stadium has its own water arrangements and standby diesel generator sets.

== Renovation ==
An installation of a personal seating and a reducement of capacity for safety reasons down to 85,000 was a long-term project meant to "give enough elbow room to the spectators and also facilitate smooth passage during the breaks".

While some changes to modernize the stadium started in 2014, the ₹1 billion (US$10 million) renovation project began earnestly in February 2015. The artificial turf at the stadium has been replaced by an all-natural grass pitch. The new grass is from Riviera Bermuda seeds and below it there are two layers of sand and gravel. The next layer is fitted with perforated pipes to prevent water-logging. German company Porplastic provided the elastic coating for the running track around the pitch, which was replaced for the first time since the stadium was built.

The lobby of the VIP entrance that leads to the player's arena was air-conditioned. The broadcast rooms and stadium offices were renovated. Bucket seats replaced the concrete benches in the galleries, which brought down the stadium's capacity from 120,000 to 85,000. The VIP and press boxes, both in the middle tier, were pulled down and a new press box with a capacity of 240 seats is now on the third tier. The VIP box remained on the second tier, with an added 240 seats. The press conference room has been shifted to a 19x8.5-metre space. A spacious broadcast room of similar dimensions has been built.

Two full-sized practice grounds and eight floodlight towers have come up at the Hyatt end of the stadium, as recommended by FIFA. The referees rooms have been built alongside the practice grounds. The number of gates to the stadium has been increased to nine. Some of the existing gates has been widened, as were the paths connecting the ring road.

== Location ==
The stadium is located in the satellite township of Salt Lake in North 24 Parganas and it also lies beside the Eastern Metropolitan Bypass which makes it easily accessible by road.

=== Transportation ===
There are numerous buses which ply around the city to the stadium. The Green Line of the Kolkata Metro is passing near the stadium, therefore the stadium has its own station, opened on 13 February 2020. The stadium is approx 13 kilometres (8.1 mi) away from N.S.C. Bose International Airport.

== Football matches ==
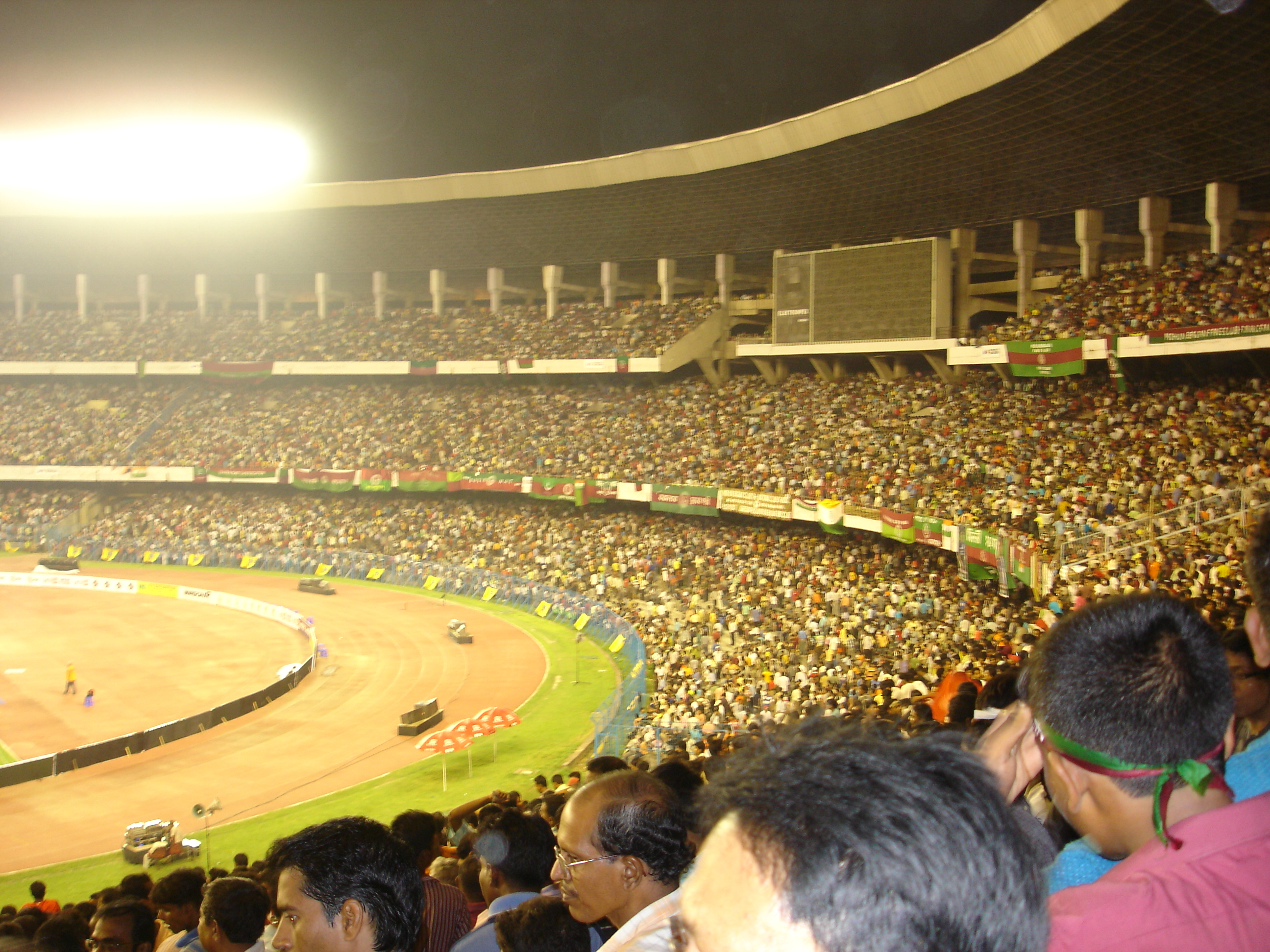
Indian crowd during the match between Bayern Munich and Mohun Bagan, May 27, 2008

After its inauguration in January 1984 with the Jawaharlal Nehru International Gold Cup, the Salt Lake Stadium has hosted several important international tournaments and matches of the 1986 FIFA World Cup qualification in 1985, Super-Soccers in 1986, 1989, 1991 and 1994, 3rd South Asian Games in 1987, USSR Festival Cup in 1988, Charminar Challenger Trophy in 1992 and the Jawaharlal Nehru International Gold Cup in 1995.

The Salt Lake Stadium has hosted the home games of three main local clubs in the I-League and the ISL, namely East Bengal, Mohun Bagan and Mohammedan SC. Many of the home games of the Indian team are also played at the Salt Lake Stadium. It also hosts selected matches of the Calcutta Football League and the IFA Shield. In 2014, a new tenant Atlético de Kolkata had made the stadium their home ground. Later, ATK was dissolved and became ATK Mohun Bagan.

On 5 June 2011, FIFA scheduled a friendly match to be played at the Salt Lake on 2 September 2011. The match was played between Argentina and Venezuela. This was a historic occasion in the history of Indian football and also for the stadium as the match featured Argentine superstar Lionel Messi. The stadium has also hosted Oliver Kahn's official farewell match for Bayern Munich when they played a friendly match against Mohun Bagan. Bayern Munich won the match 3–0. In December 2012, a friendly match was played between Brazil Masters and IFA All Stars. Brazil Masters won it 3–1. Beto scored twice and Bebeto scored one goal for Brazil Masters.

On 12 October 2014, the stadium hosted the first match in the Indian Super League, preceded by an opening ceremony which featured superstars from the footballing world as well as from Bollywood. In the opening match, Atlético de Kolkata defeated Mumbai City 3–0. The stadium hosted its last match of the inaugural edition of ISL on 14 December where Atlético de Kolkata played FC Goa in the first leg of the semi-finals. Salt Lake stadium was the only stadium among the eight venues of ISL where matches were allowed to be played on artificial turf. It hosted 11 matches in 2017 FIFA U-17 World Cup, including the Final. The stadium also hosted the FIFA world cup qualification match between Bangladesh and India.

In December 2025, Salt Lake Stadium hosted the opening event of Lionel Messi's G.O.A.T. India Tour, which was overshadowed by crowd-control failures and disruptions that led to police intervention, an official investigation, and a public apology by the state's then Chief Minister, Mamata Banerjee.

On 3 October 2026, Salt Lake Stadium will host the first ever football match between India and Brazil. Brazil won the match 4-0, with Samuel Lino scoring a brace.

On 6 October 2026, Salt Lake Stadium will host India's second football match against Uruguay. Uruguay won the match 6-1, with Anirudh Thapa scoring the lone goal for India.

== Other uses ==
The stadium also hosts important athletic events. It has hosted the SAF Games in 1987 and various national athletics events in India. The stadium also hosts different kinds of cultural programs such as dance and music concerts. The stadium also hosted the opening ceremony of 2013 IPL season.

== Gallery ==
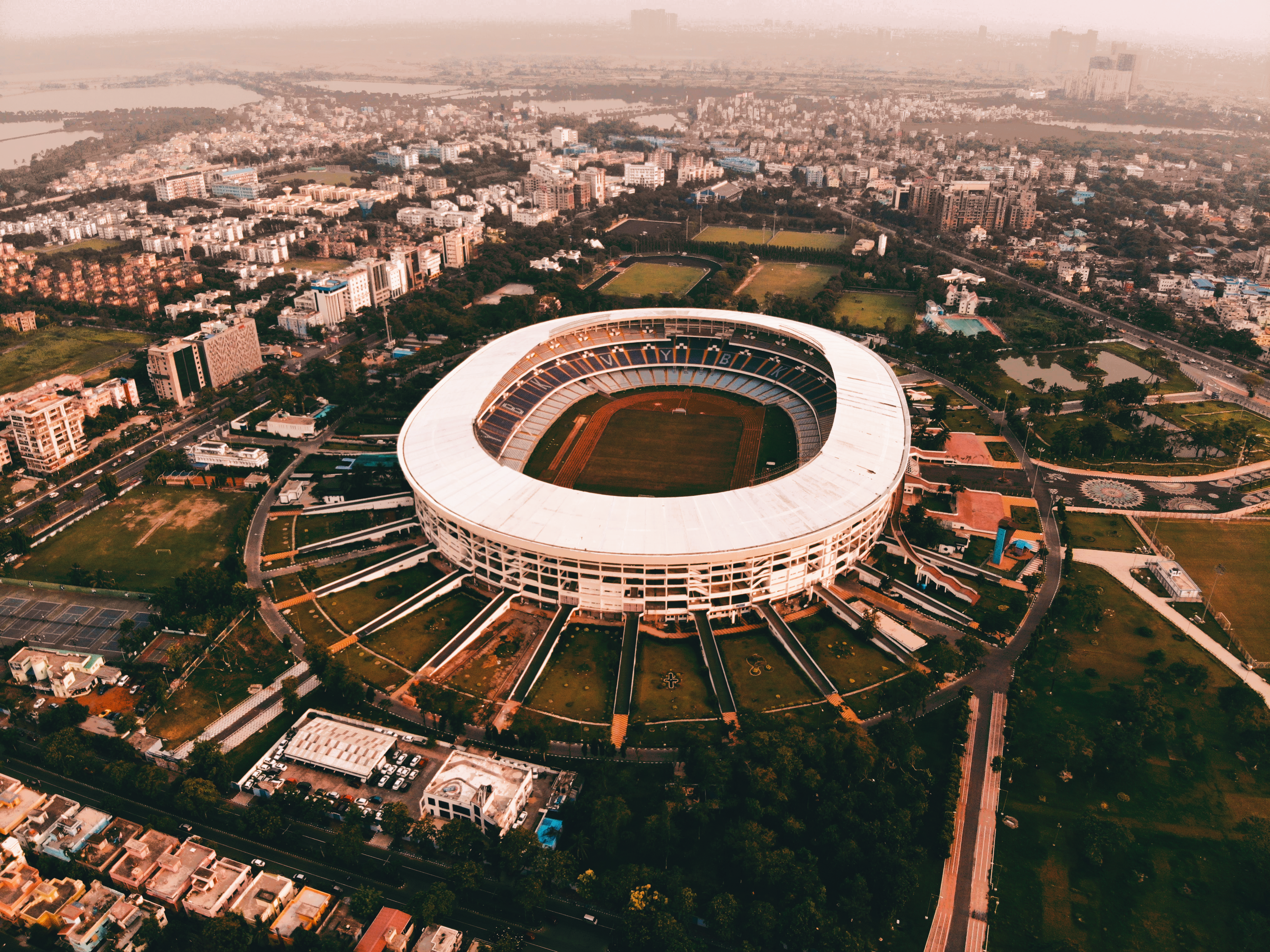
Aerial view of the Yuva Bharati Krirangan

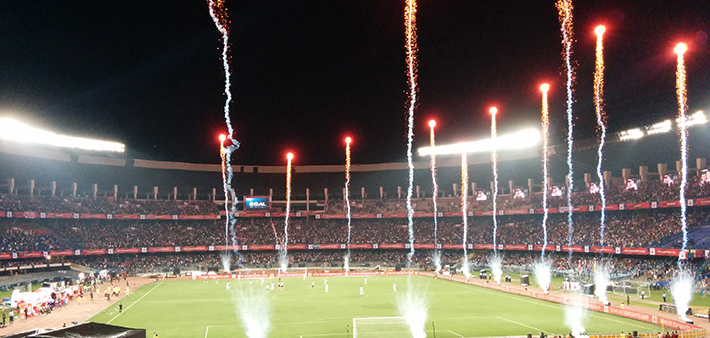
The stadium during inauguration of 2014 Indian Super League

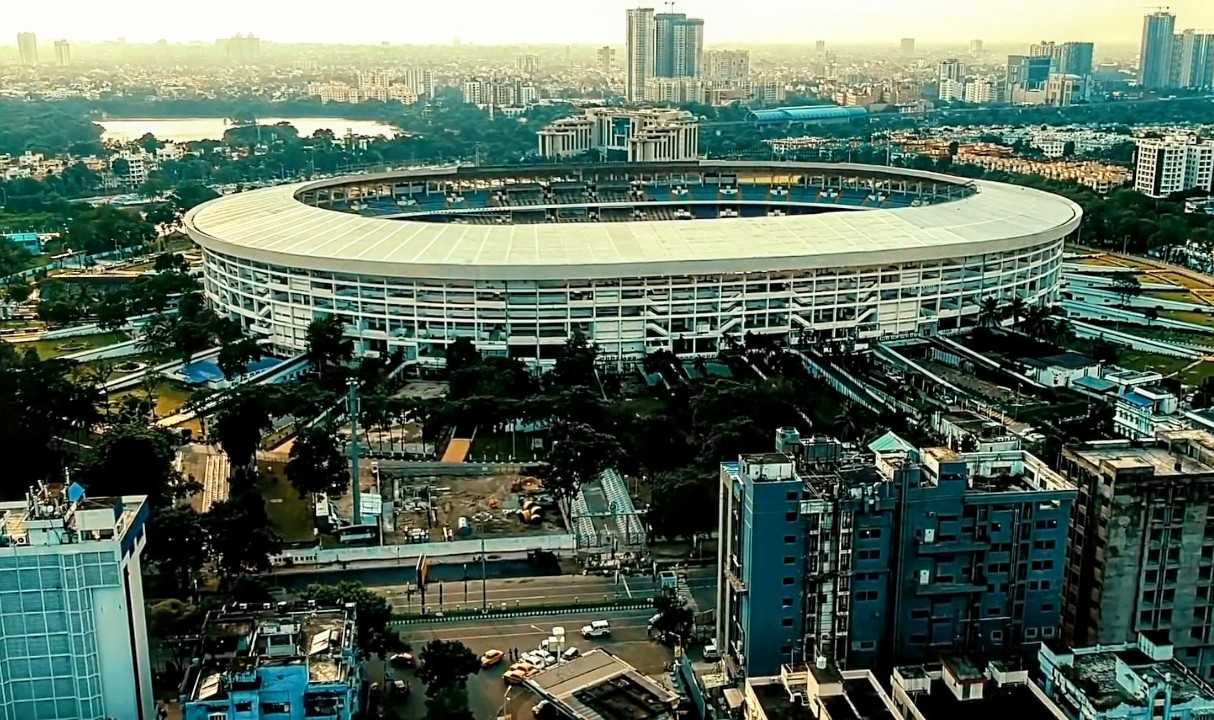
A view of the stadium in November 2021

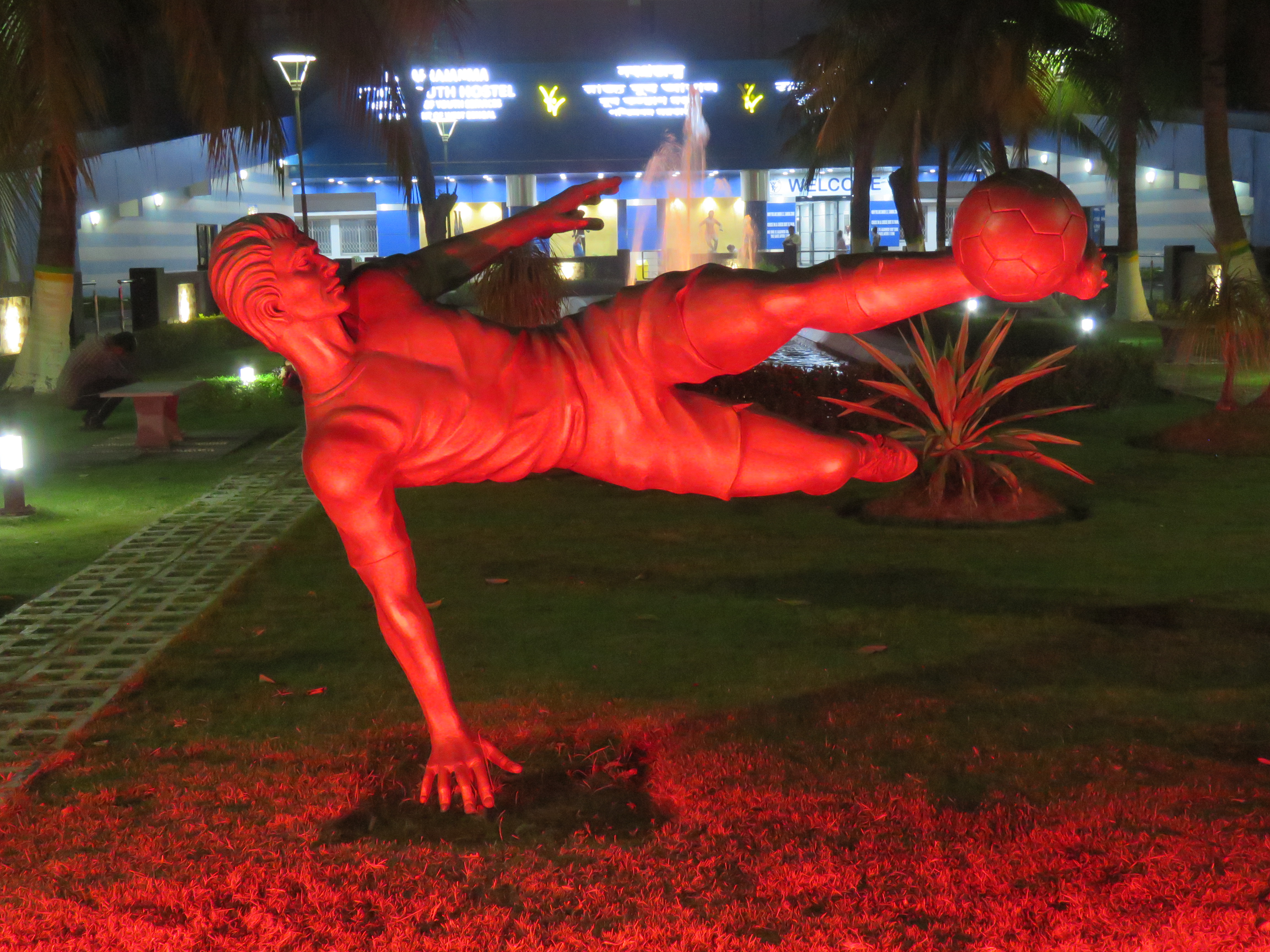
Statue of a player near the main gate of VYBK

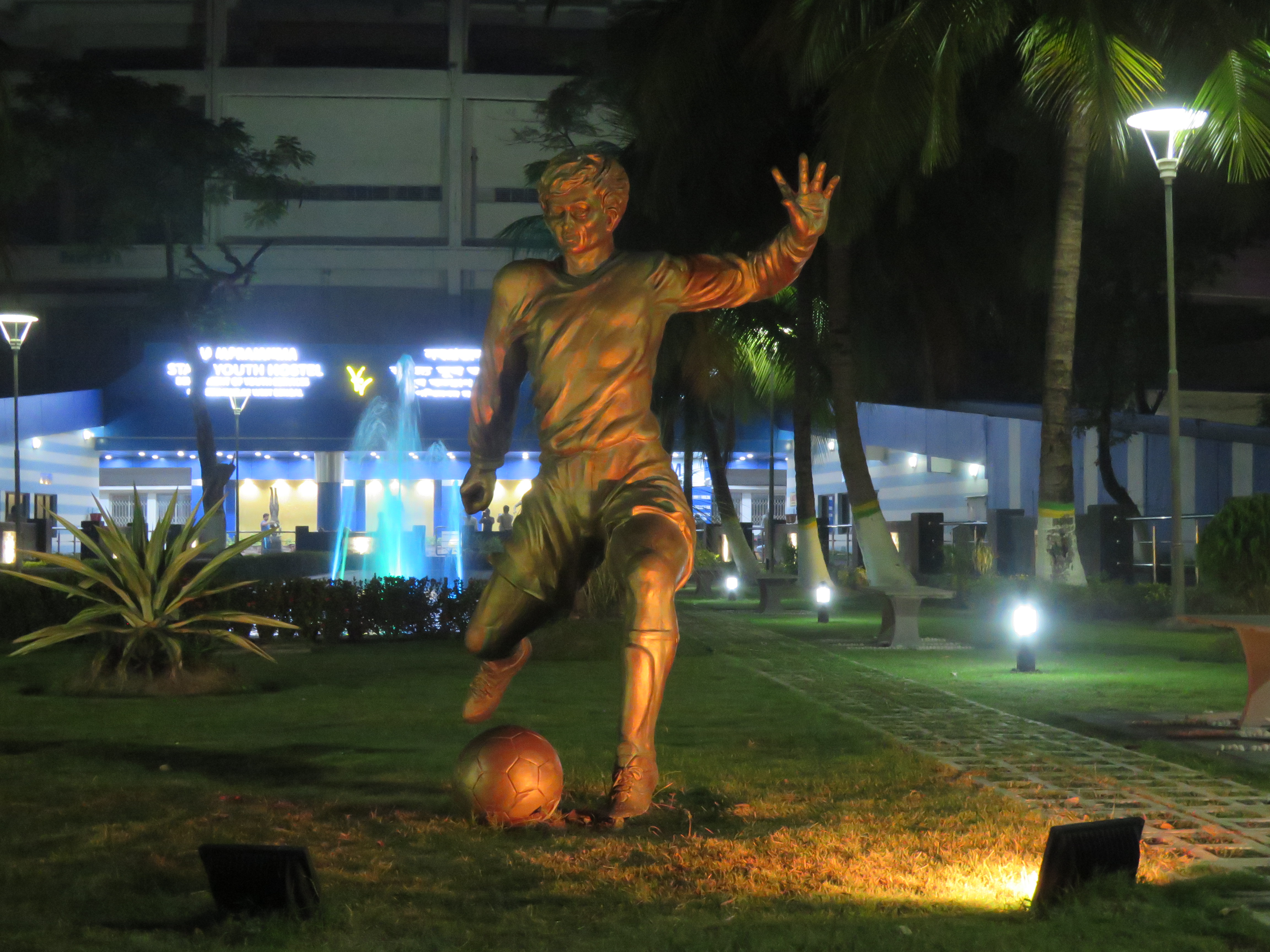
Statue of a player near the main gate of VYBK

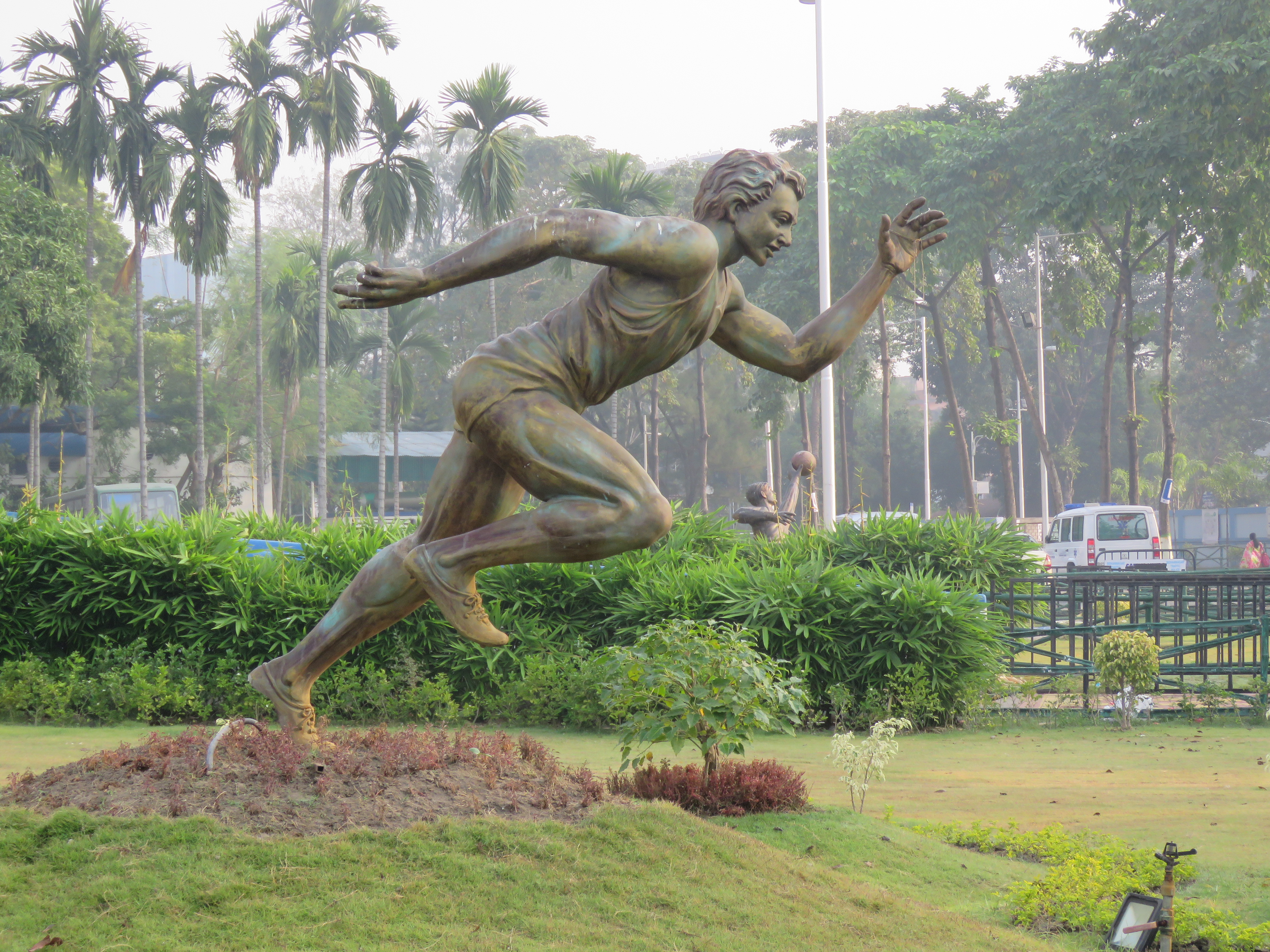
Statue of a player near the VYBK

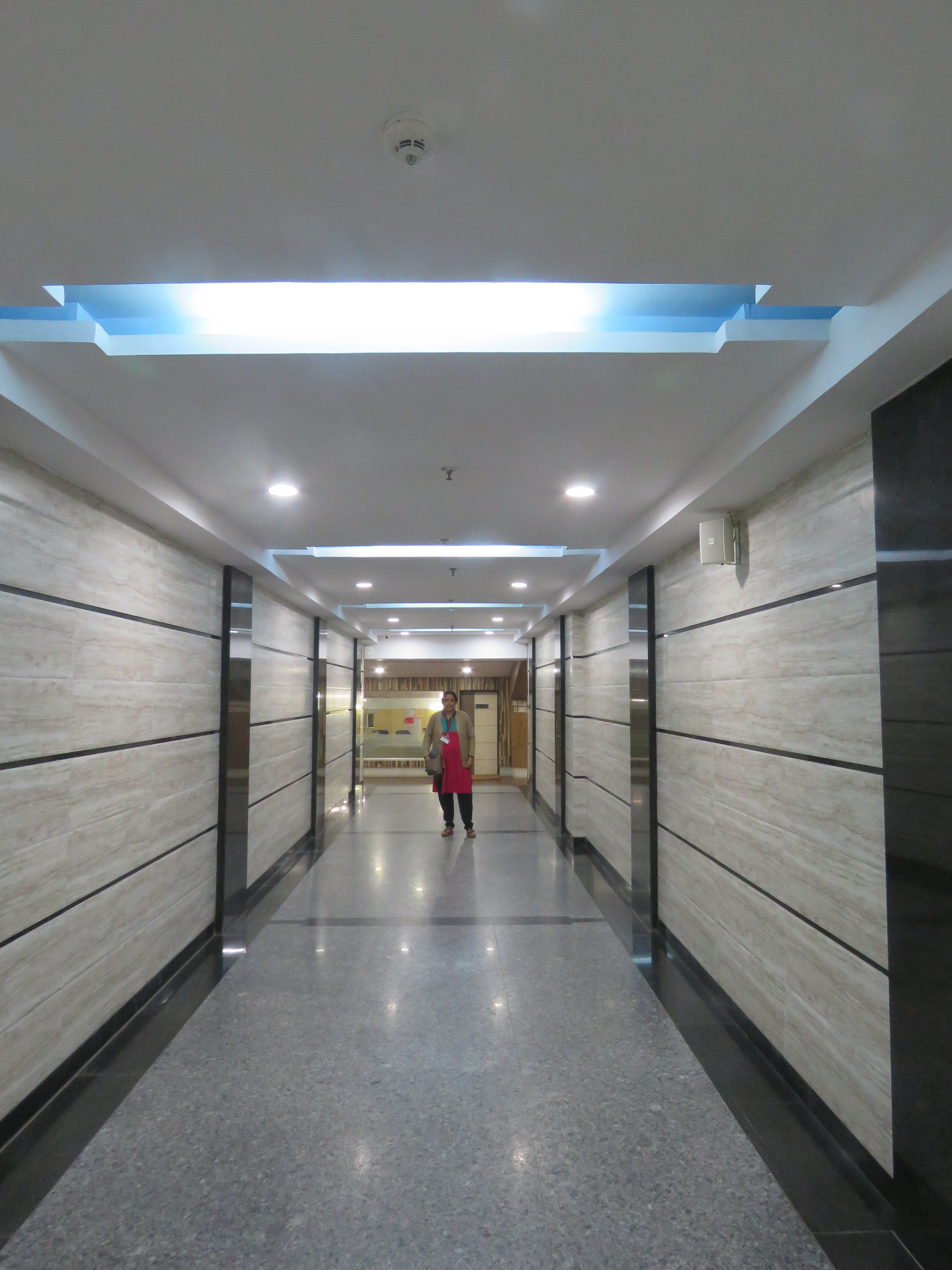
Interior of VYBK

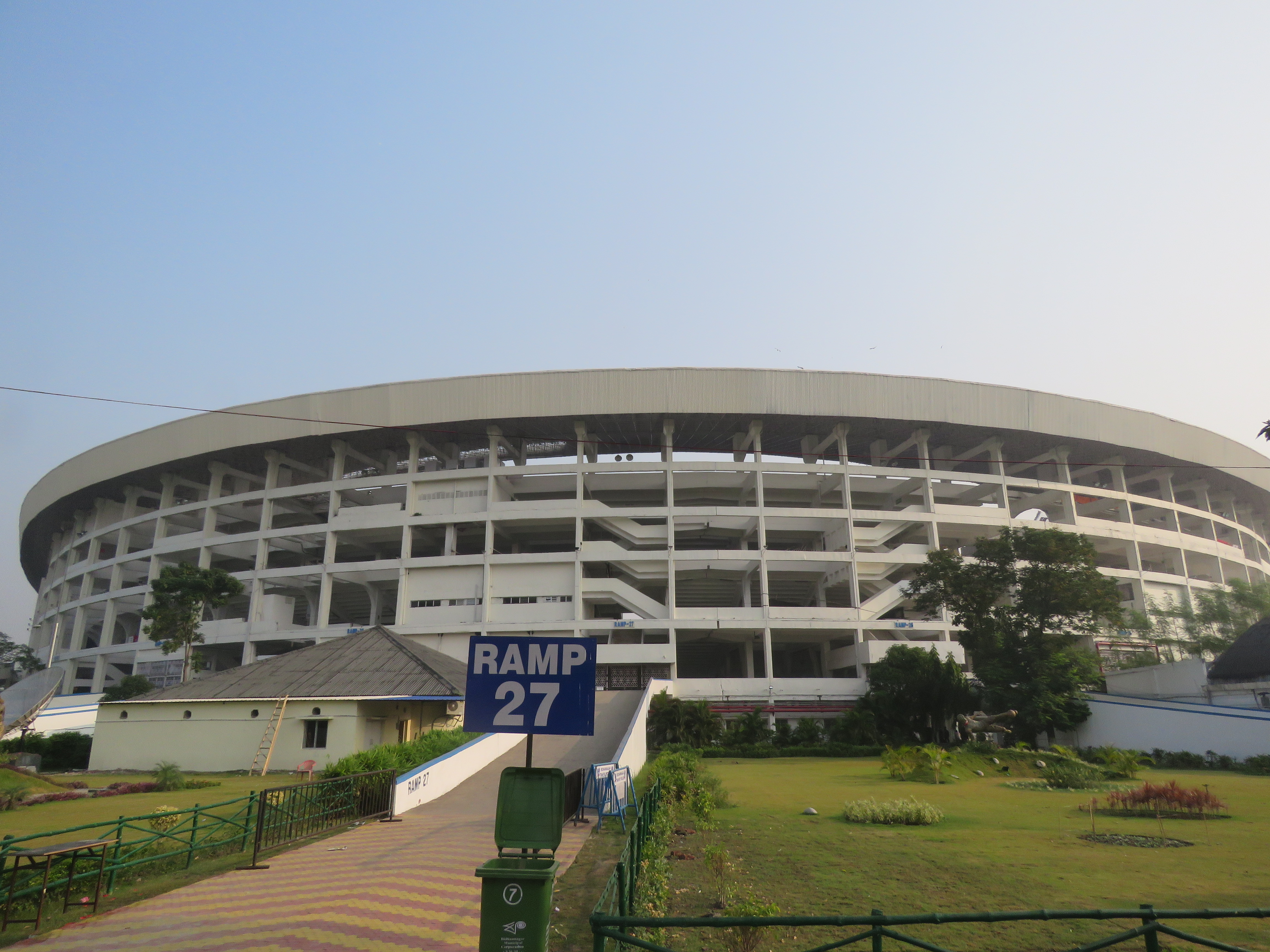
Exterior of VYBK

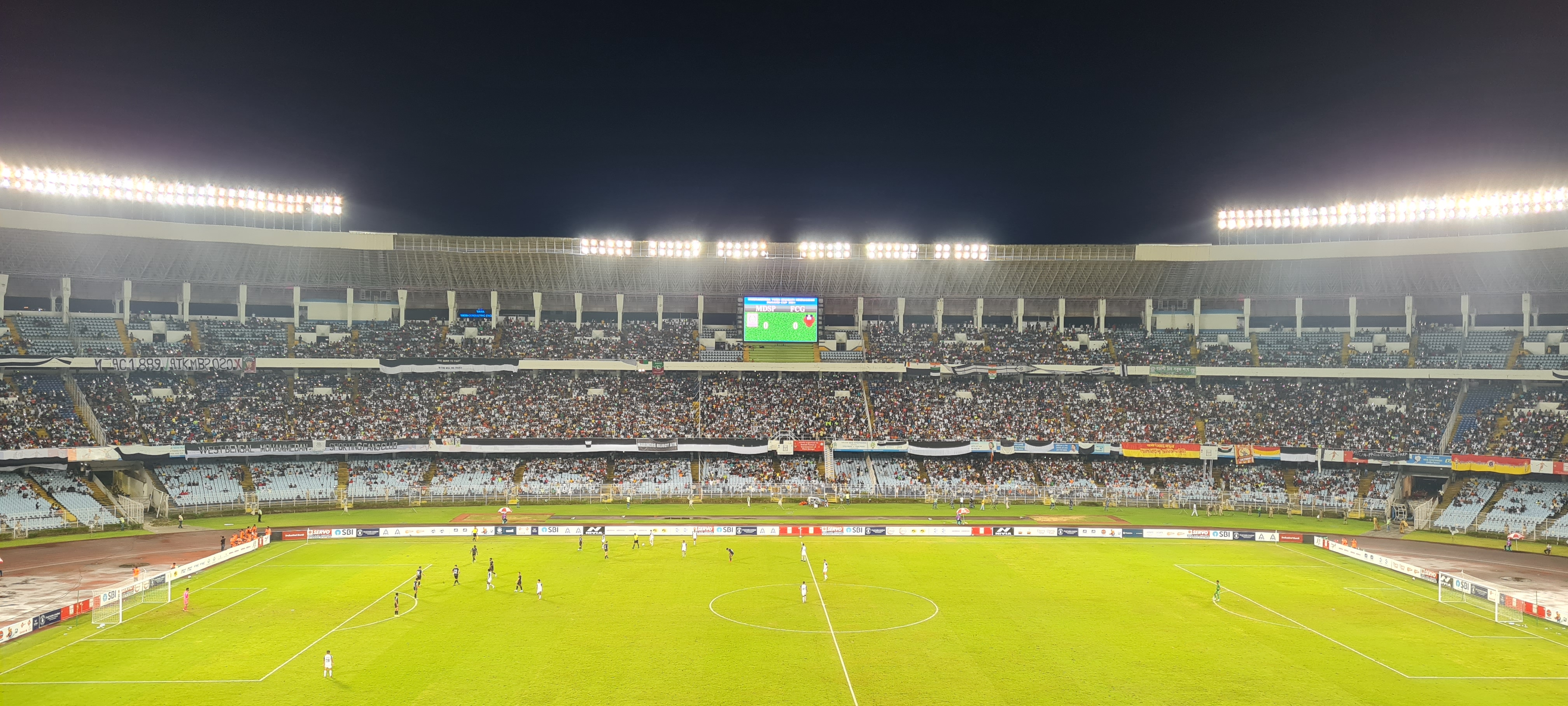
The stadium during the 2021 Durand Cup Final between FC Goa and Mohammedan SC

== See also ==
- List of football stadiums in India
- List of stadiums in India
- List of association football stadiums by capacity
- List of Asian stadiums by capacity
- Lists of stadiums

Preceded by Estadio Azteca	Largest football stadium in the world January 1984 – May 1989	Succeeded by Rungrado May Day Stadium
