= Hostel Days (Bengali TV series) =

2022 Indian Bengali web series

- Release poster
- Genre: Coming-of-age comedy drama
- Written by: Sam; Rana
- Directed by: Satyaki Kundu; Souvik Mondal
- Starring: Anindya Sengupta; Rohaan Bhattacharjee; Arpan Ghoshal
- Country of origin: India
- Original language: Bengali
- No. of seasons: 1
- No. of episodes: 6

Production
- Cinematography: Indranil Mukherjee
- Editor: Saugata Mukherjee
- Camera setup: Single-camera
- Running time: 21—30 minutes
- Production company: Acropoliis Entertainment

Original release
- Release: 25 November 2022

Hostel Days is a 2022 Indian Bengali coming-of-age comedy drama web series directed by Satyaki Kundu and Souvik Mondal. Written by Sam and Rana, the series has been produced under the banner of Acropoliis Entertainment. The series stars Anindya Sengupta, Rohaan Bhattacharjee and Arpan Ghoshal in the lead roles.

Principal photography took place at an engineering hostel complex in North Bengal, while some additional outdoor scenes were filmed in Mandarmani and other locations in the region. Indranil Mukherjee did the cinematography while Saugata Mukherjee handled the editing. The series was streamed on Hoichoi on 25 November 2022.

== Overview ==
The series follows three college friends — Orko, Kapil and Parikkhit, who live together in a hostel at an engineering college in North Bengal. Parikkhit is the hostel's cook and is known for his khichdi and other dishes. When financial difficulties affect him, Orko and Kapil help him start a small food business on a food cart. The business becomes popular, but a mistake by Orko causes a rift among them.

Years later, Orko, now a popular food vlogger and aspiring restaurateur, meets Kapil again during a promotional shoot. They set out to find Pari and reconnect with their old friend. Their meeting leads them to reflect on their friendship and the events of their college years.

== Cast ==
- Anindya Sengupta as Orko a.k.a. OG
- Rohaan Bhattacharjee as Kapil
- Arpan Ghoshal as Parikkhit a.k.a. Pari
- Kanchan Mullick as Tinku Da
- Subha Chattopadhyay as Shubhamoy a.k.a. Bhakto
- Roshni Bhattacharyya as Mini
- Pushan Dasgupta as Chanchal a.k.a. Begun
- Rahul Barui as Gupho
- Kaushik Chakraborty as Mr. Pathak
- Pradeepto Ray as Professor Dutta
- Siddharth Basu Roy as a chef
- Rohan Banerjee as Gambat

== Episodes ==
| No. | Title | Directed by | Written by | Original release date |
|---|---|---|---|---|
| 1 | "Khichdi" | Satyaki Kundu and Souvik Mondal | Sam and Rana | November 25, 2022 |
| 2 | "Case Jaundice" | Satyaki Kundu and Souvik Mondal | Sam and Rana | November 25, 2022 |
| 3 | "Kurmur Kurmur Dhoom Dharakka" | Satyaki Kundu and Souvik Mondal | Sam and Rana | November 25, 2022 |
| 4 | "Cloud 9 Kitchen" | Satyaki Kundu and Souvik Mondal | Sam and Rana | November 25, 2022 |
| 5 | "Trap" | Satyaki Kundu and Souvik Mondal | Sam and Rana | November 25, 2022 |
| 6 | "Lost and Found" | Satyaki Kundu and Souvik Mondal | Sam and Rana | November 25, 2022 |

== Reception ==
=== Critical reception ===
Agnivo Niyogi of The Telegraph reviewed the series and opined "Hostel Days, the latest series from Bengali streaming platform Hoichoi, takes a fond and sometimes wistful trip down memory lane as it rekindles the nostalgia of college life with fun, frolics, heartbreaks and a grand celebration of friendship." He appreciated the idiosyncrasies of each of the characters, performance of the whole cast — particularly the lead trio of Anindya, Rohaan and Arpan, the dialogues, the screenplay, the nostalgia-evoking lyrics of the songs, the editing and the cinematography.

Aakash Misra of Sangbad Pratidin reviewed the series and wrote "This series doesn't really add up. There are several flaws in the story. If the director thought that using excessive swearing would get him a thumbs up, he thought completely wrong." He praised the making of the series, the editing, the cinematography, the music and the performance of the whole cast but criticized the series for each of its episodes being inspired by some other Bollywood film and for using Bollywood style nostalgia-evoking formula in a Bengali–ness template.

Poorna Banerjee of The Times of India rated the series 3/5 stars and wrote "It's nice to indulge in wistful melancholia, if one may, which is rife throughout the course of this series – where the director duo puts enough common clues that is sure to touch some hearts." She applauded the casting, the cinematography, Kanchan Mullick's extended cameo and the nostalgia-evoking anecdotes but bemoaned the rushed story, numerous loopholes in the plot and predictable ending.

Archi Sengupta of Leisure Byte rated the series 3/5 stars and noted "Hostel Days is an easy-breezy nostalgia watch which will smell of 3 Idiots if you sniff close enough. There are some sweet moments, and it gets us reeled in with its reliability. However, it doesn’t go deep enough for us to care towards the fag end of the series and ends on a disappointing and rushed note." She praised the nostalgia in the series, the complete arc given to the story, the performance of the actors and the relationships between hostel mates but criticized the excessive pace throughout the series, numerous unexplained conflicts, several inconsistencies towards the later episodes, abrupt ending of the series and the unnecessary usage of cuss words.
