= Paanch Phoron =

Bengali web series

- Genre: Anthology, Romance
- Directed by: Arka Ganguly, Dipankar Dipon, Tauquir Ahmed, Suman Mukhopadhyay, Nurul Alam Atique, Chandril Bhattacharya, Sudipto Roy, Giasuddin Selim
- Country of origin: India
- Original language: Bengali
- No. of seasons: 2
- No. of episodes: 10

Production
- Production company: Organinc Studios Private Limited

Original release
- Release: 14 February 2019 – 14 February 2020

Paanch Phoron is a 2019 Bengali web series streamed on the OTT platform Hoichoi. The series is a collection of five romantic stories produced by five different directors. It is named after the panch phoron spice blend, which means 'five spices'. The series has been well received and is currently on its second season.

== Cast ==
- Anirban Bhattacharya
- Jaya Ahsan
- Derek Ngoni Moyo
- Sohini Sarkar
- Siam Ahmed
- Masuma Rahman Nabila
- Riddhi Sen
- Vikram Chatterjee
- Rajnandini Paul
- Sohag Sen
- Rawnak Hasan
- Zakia Bari Momo
- Krittika Chakraborty
- Rohit Samanta
- Debparna Chakraborty
- Tariq Anam Khan
- Yash Rohan
- Orchita Sporshia
- Amrita Chattopadhyay
- Anindya Sengupta
- Aindrila Sharma
- Ritwika Pal
- Anindya Pulak Banerjee
- Biswajit Ghosh
- Monir Khan Shimul
- Ahmed Hasan Suny
- Zinat Sanu Swagata
- Farhana Mithu
- Sudip Biswas Deep
- Sneha Chatterjee Bhowmik
- Missouri Rashid

== Season 1 (2019) ==
Indian video streaming service Hoichoi released the five-episode first season on Valentine's Day in 2019.

The first episode, 'Phoringer Bou', is directed by Arka Ganguly. A young girl from a suburban city struggles to make friends due to her shy and quiet nature. The story begins with her newly made playmates marrying her to a dragonfly.

In the second episode, titled 'Gopone Prem Charan' and directed by Suman Mukhopadhyay, a young man falls in love with a married woman.

The third episode, titled 'Lilith', is directed by Dipankar Dipon. The story is set in the city of Dhaka, Bangladesh, where a fictional new technology, "the national truth rating", has taken the country by storm.

The fourth episode, 'Biroho Uttor', is directed by Bangladeshi director Tauquir Ahmed. In this story, a man struggles to keep his job.

The final episode of the season, titled 'Ekti Paati Premer Golpo', and directed by Abhishek Saha, portrays the love of two childhood friends, now adults.

== Episodes ==
No.	Title	Directed by	Original release date
1	"Phoringer Bou"	Arka Ganguly	14 February 2019
2	"Gopone Prem Charan"	Suman Mukhopadhyay	14 February 2019
3	"Lilith"	Dipankar Dipon	14 February 2019
4	"Biroho Uttor"	Tauquir Ahmed	14 February 2019
5	"Ekti Paati Premer Galpo"	Abhishek Saha	14 February 2019

== Season 2 (2020) ==
Hoichoi launched the second season on 14 February 2020. This season stars Swastika Mukherjee, Sohini Sarkar, Saurav Chakraborty, and more. This season, like the first, presents five individual stories of love, each directed by different directors.

== Episodes ==
No.	Title	Directed by	Original release date
1	"Khworkuto"	Arka Ganguly	14 February 2020
2	"Donor"	Nurul Alam Atique	14 February 2020
3	"Praay Kafka"	Chandril Bhattacharya	14 February 2020
4	"Afternoon Audition"	Sudipto Roy	14 February 2020
5	"Three Kisses"	Giasuddin Selim	14 February 2020

== Reception ==
=== Critical response ===
Bhaskar Chattopadhyay, writing in Firstpost, rated the series three out of five stars saying "Paanch Phoron offers a satisfying and palatable fare by the end of it all, leaving you asking for a second helping".

Antara Chakraborthy of Indian Express writes "The first episode (my favourite) of Season 1 is a beautiful take on innocent love that happens in life before you even understand what love is. The episode takes its own time, but it never bothers us. The slow pace shows us exactly how laidback life is in a small town. The music, picturization and the director’s eye for detail make the episode a very memorable one."
