= Oti Uttam =

2024 Bengali language Indian film

- Directed by: Srijit Mukherji
- Written by: Srijit Mukherji
- Produced by: Rupa Dutta
- Starring: Uttam Kumar(Montages); Anindya Sengupta; Roshni Bhattacharya; Gourab Chatterjee; Laboni Sarkar
- Cinematography: Soumik Haldar
- Edited by: Pronoy Dasgupta
- Music by: Songs: Saptak Sanai Das; Score: Prabuddha Banerjee
- Production company: Camellia Productions
- Distributed by: PVR Inox Pictures
- Release date: 22 March 2024
- Running time: 137 minutes
- Country: India
- Language: Bengali
- Box office: ₹1.56 crore

Oti Uttam is a 2024 Indian Bengali-language fantasy comedy film written, co-produced and directed by Srijit Mukherji under Camellia Productions and Matchcut Productions. Veteran Bengali actor Uttam Kumar appears on the screen through Visual effects from his existing clippings from his various films. His character was built by the scenes of his 56 existing old movies.

== Plot ==
Krishnendu, a Ph.D. researcher working on a project on Mahanayak Uttam Kumar. He likes a girl but gets refused every time. The researcher decides to bring his icon Uttam Kumar's spirit through planchette. Mahanayak's grandson helps him in to fulfill the love life of researcher. But things get complicated when Sohini falls in love for with Uttam Kumar at the first sight of his spirit.

== Cast ==
- Uttam Kumar as himself (Montages from his early Films)
- Anindya Sengupta as Krishnendu a Ph.D. researcher
- Gourab Chatterjee as himself
- Roshni Bhattacharyya as Sohini
- Laboni Sarkar as Krishnendu's Mother
- Subhasish Mukherjee as Krishnendu's Father
- VJ Jina Tarafdar

== Music ==
The music of the film except track 6 is composed by Saptak Sanai Das and lyrics are penned by Dhrubojyoti Chakraborty, Kaustuv Bhattacharya and Srijit Mukherji. Shokhi Bhabona Kahare Bawle is an original composition by Rabindranath Tagore.

The first single "Saiyyan Beimaan" was released on 14 February 2024. The second single "Chawl Meye" was released on 21 February 2024. The third single "Mon Kharaper Gaan" was dropped on 28 February 2024. The fourth song "Bondhu Bhaabi" was releasesd on 8 March 2024.

Oti Uttam

Soundtrack album by Saptak Sanai Das
- Released: 2024
- Recorded: 2023
- Genre: Feature film soundtrack
- Language: Bengali
- Label: CamelliaFilms Production

Saptak Sanai Das chronology
X=Prem (2022)	Oti Uttam (2024)	Daroga Mamur Kirti (2024)

=== Original ===
No.	Title	Lyrics	Singer(s)	Length
1.	"Saiyyan Beimaan (Female)"	Dhrubojyoti Chakraborty.	Monali Thakur	3:30
2.	"Chawl Meye"	Kaustuv Bhattacharya	Saptak Sanai Das	3:59
3.	"Mon Kharaper Gaan"	Dhrubojyoti Chakraborty	Rupankar Bagchi	4:45
4.	"Bondhu Bhaabi"	Srijit Mukherji	Upal Sengupta	3:23
5.	"Preme Porechhen Rai"	Dhrubojyoti Chakraborty	Arnab Chakraborty	3:22
6.	"Shokhi Bhabona Kahare Bawle"	Rabindranath Tagore	Anirban Bhattacharya	3:16
7.	"Saiyyan Beimaan (Male)"	Dhrubojyoti Chakraborty	Papon	3:32

== Release ==
The film was scheduled for theatrical release in 2023. After multiple delays, the film has theatrically released on 22 March 2024.

== Reception ==
Poorna Banerjee of the Times of India rated the film 3 out of 5 stars and praised Mukherji for his efforts to create a cinematic cosmos out of his existing chaotic filmography, but she criticised the length, the loopholes in the plot and the performance of the cast, except Anindya. Shamayita Chakraborty of OTTplay rated the film 2.5 out of 5 stars and wrote "Srijit Mukherji scores 10 on 10 in effort but an aerial Uttam Kumar fails him." She praised Mukherji's experimentation, the music but criticised the story and missing links from the story.

Agnivo Niyogi of The Telegraph reviewed the film on a positive note, praising the cinematography, Mukherji's efforts for integration of dialogue snippets and visuals from Uttam Kumar's films and the acting of the whole cast. Hindustan Times and Sangbad Pratidin also gave similar reviews on the film.
