= Nikosh Chhaya =

Indian Bengali supernatural horror web series

- Release poster
- Genre: Supernatural Horror
- Created by: Parambrata Chattopadhyay
- Based on: "Niren Bhaduri Samagra" by Souvik Chakraborty
- Written by: Sreejib
- Screenplay by: Sreejib
- Directed by: Parambrata Chattopadhyay - Season 1; Sayantan Ghosal - Season 2
- Starring: Chiranjeet Chakraborty; Kanchan Mullick; Gaurav Chakraborty; Surangana Bandyopadhyay
- Theme music composer: Nabarun Bose
- Composer: Nabarun Bose
- Country of origin: India
- Original language: Bengali
- No. of seasons: 2
- No. of episodes: 12

Production
- Production location: Kolkata
- Cinematography: Prosenjit Chowdhury - Season 1; Tuban - Season 2
- Editor: Sumit
- Camera setup: Single-camera
- Production companies: Roadshow Films - Season 1; Follow Focus Films - Season 2

Original release
- Release: 2024 – present

Nikosh Chhaya (transl. Dark Shadow) is an Indian Bengali supernatural horror thriller web series. Adapted from the eponymous third novel of "Niren Bhaduri Samagra" written by Souvik Chakraborty, the series is the second installment of the Bhaduri Moshai series, after Parnashavarir Shaap (2023) directed by Parambrata Chattopadhyay. Written by Sreejib and conceptualized by Chattopadhyay, the first season of the series has been directed by Parambrata Chattopadhyay while the second season has been directed by Sayantan Ghosal.

Chiranjeet Chakraborty and Kanchan Mullick play the lead roles while Gaurav Chakraborty and Surangana Bandyopadhyay play other pivotal roles. The series deals with occult specialist Niren Bhaduri, who tackles an Aghori tantrik Bhanu, who is trying to gain immortality using dark rituals on stolen corpses. Nabarun Bose did the music and background score. Sumit did the editing while the cinematography was handled by Prosenjit Cowdhury in the first season and Tuban in the second season. Two seasons are streaming are streaming on the Bengali OTT platform Hoichoi.

== Overview ==
Corpses of young people mysteriously started to disappear from morgues and stolen from hearse vans. Police officer Amiya starts investigating the case, but soon realizes that the mystery is beyond the conventional reality. He calls upon Nirendranath Bhaduri, an occult specialist, to help him investigate the series of bizarre events. They realise that some Aghori tantrik has used those corpses to achieve something unethical. Their search intensified when one of the investigating police officer's daughter, Banya, was kidnapped. Finally, through that link, Bhaduri Moshai and his associates' investigation lead them to a sinister tantric Bhanu, who was attempting to resurrect an ancient demon Genu during the blood moon, in order to gain immortality.

== Cast ==
| Portrayed by | Character | 1 | 2 |
|---|---|---|---|
| Chiranjeet Chakraborty | Nirendranath Bhaduri a.k.a. Bhaduri Moshai, an occult and tantra expert | Main |
| Surangana Bandyopadhyay | Mitul, Bhaduri Moshai's assistant | Main |
| Gaurav Chakraborty | Amiya, a police officer and Mitul's fiancee | Main |
| Kanchan Mullick | Loknath Chakraborty a.k.a. Bhanu, an Aghori tantrik and Bhaduri Moshai's ex-student | Main |
| Anindita Bose | Titas, a general physician | Main |
| Arno Mukhopadhyay | Pallab | Main |
| Debaprasad Haldar | Deepak Pal, assistant police officer | Recurring |
| Pallab Mukhopadhyay | Genu, a demon | Recurring |
| Anujoy Chattopadhyay | Sanjay, Amiya and Titas' college friend | Recurring | None |
| Rahul Dev Bose | — | Guest | None |
| Rob Dey | Debdut Gomes, a dead police officer controlled by Bhanu | None | Recurring |
| Anubhab Kanjilal | Young Loknath | None | Recurring |
| Koushani Mukhopadhyay | Banya | None | Recurring |
| Honey Bafna | Young Bhaduri Moshai | None | Guest |
| Swikriti Majumder | Nivedita, Bhaduri Moshai's wife's spirit, who died during childbirth | None | Guest |

== Production ==
=== Announcement and development ===
Nikosh Chhaya was announced by Hoichoi on 15 October 2024, in its "Notun Bhabe Bachar Jonyo Notun Golpo" content announcement slate. It is the second installment of the Bhaduri Moshai series, after Parnashavarir Shaap (2023). Nikosh Chhaya was initially adopted as the working title, but later, it was finalised as the official title for the series.

There are only three stories in the Bhaduri Moshai series, of which Parnashavarir Shaap had already been done. Aranyer Prachin Prabad takes place when Bhaduri Moshai is young. So that was out of the question as it meant getting a younger actor to play him in place of Chiranjeet Chakraborty. I didn’t want to do that as the character had just been established and was well-accepted by the audience. That left Nikosh Chhaya as my only choice.

— Parambrata Chattopadhyay, during an interview with t2 Online, on why he chose Nikosh Chhaya as the second installment of the Bhaduri Moshai series

The second season titled Nikosh Chhaya 2, was announced on Hoichoi's "Golper Parbon 1432" content announcement slate on 28 February 2025. The usage of VFX in the series was kept minimal to make it look as real as possible. The team had an occult and tantra consultant along with them to ensure authenticity and realism, despite taking some cinematic liberties.

=== Pre-production ===
Stage actor Pallab Mukhopadhyay played the role of Genu, a demon who is loyal to his tantric Bhanu. His make-up took three hours daily, including putting up fake teeth, cloudy eye-lenses and rugged skin colouration. He was fed enough before filming because with the heavy prosthetics, it wouldn't be possible to eat during the filming breaks. Mukhopadhyay shared in an interview that Kanchan Mullick helped him to walk in the sets since he could barely see anything owing to the heavy prosthetics.

=== Casting ===
Chiranjeet Chakraborty reprised the role of Nirendranath Bhaduri a.k.a. Bhaduri Moshai from Parnashavarir Shaap (2023). Surangana Bandyopadhyay, Gaurav Chakrabarty, Arno Mukhopadhyay and Anindita Bose also reprised their roles from the first installment of the Bhaduri Moshai series. This time, Surangana plays Bhaduri Moshai's assistant while Gaurav plays an investigating police officer. Kanchan Mullick was roped in the to play the key antagonist in the series. Anujoy Chatterjee was cast in a pivotal role. Honey Bafna joined the cast in the second season, for which he withdrew himself from the television soap Shubo Bibaho.

=== Filming ===
Principal filmography for the first season started in August 2024 and was wrapped up within September 2024. Majority of the filming has been done in suburban Kolkata, primarily Barasat. Parts of the series has also been shot at Madhyamgram, Birati, Bantala and Baruipur. Pivotal scenes of the series have been shot at a morgue in Kolkata. Filming for the second season started in November 2025 and was completed within December 2025.

== Episodes ==
| Series | Episodes | Originally released |
|---|---|---|
| 1 | 6 | 31 October 2024 |
| 2 | 6 | 23 January 2026 |

=== Season 1 ===
| No. | Title | Directed by | Written by | Original release date |
|---|---|---|---|---|
| 1 | "Abahon" | Parambrata Chattopadhyay | Sreejib | 31 October 2024 |
| 2 | "Smriti Bismriti" | Parambrata Chattopadhyay | Sreejib | 31 October 2024 |
| 3 | "Obhishaap" | Parambrata Chattopadhyay | Sreejib | 31 October 2024 |
| 4 | "Adot Kotha" | Parambrata Chattopadhyay | Sreejib | 31 October 2024 |
| 5 | "Shomuho Bipod" | Parambrata Chattopadhyay | Sreejib | 31 October 2024 |
| 6 | "Shommukh Shomor" | Parambrata Chattopadhyay | Sreejib | 31 October 2024 |

=== Season 2 ===
| No. | Title | Directed by | Written by | Original release date |
|---|---|---|---|---|
| 1 | "Mritodeho Haantchey" | Sayantan Ghosal | Sreejib | 23 January 2026 |
| 2 | "Ektu Rokto De Maa" | Sayantan Ghosal | Sreejib | 23 January 2026 |
| 3 | "Bhrom" | Sayantan Ghosal | Sreejib | 23 January 2026 |
| 4 | "Chinmoyee" | Sayantan Ghosal | Sreejib | 23 January 2026 |
| 5 | "Noibeddyo" | Sayantan Ghosal | Sreejib | 23 January 2026 |
| 6 | "Asun Gurudeb" | Sayantan Ghosal | Sreejib | 23 January 2026 |

== Marketing ==
The trailer of the first season of Nikosh Chhaya was released on 21 October 2024. It was released at an event held at the dilapidated Basu Bati mansion in Bagbazar, Kolkata. The trailer of the second season was released on 15 January 2026.

== Release ==
The first season was streamed on 31 October 2024, on the occasion of Bhoot Chaturdashi, on the Bengali OTT platform Hoichoi. The second season was released on 23 January 2026 on Hoichoi, coinciding with Netaji Jayanti.

== Reception ==
=== Critical reception ===
Poorna Banerjee of The Times of India rated the series 3.5/5 stars and wrote "It is difficult to find a series in Bengali that works to create a story that’s both supernatural and believable. However, the director does his best to extract excellent performances from each character, and utilises sound, colour and props to set the mood for the dark drama." She praised attention to details provided in the Tantric chants and background score, slow build-up throughout the episodes and the performances of the lead cast, particularly Kanchan and Chiranjeet.

Agnivo Niyogi of The Telegraph reviewed the series and opined "One of the show’s most significant achievements is its ability to make the paranormal feel plausible within a contemporary, urban context. Parambrata has managed to conjure a world where ancient occult practices seem not only possible but terrifyingly close to reality." He praised the performances of Chiranjeet as Niren Bhaduri, Kanchan as an Aghori tantric, Suranagana as Bhaduri Moshai's assistant and Gaurav in the role of a police officer, the cinematography and the effective cameos.

Sandipta Bhanja of Sangbad Pratidin reviewed the series and wrote "Non-lipid intense screenplay throughout six episodes, accompanied with light-shadow cinematography and intense acting drives the series." She praised the acting of Chiranjneet, Kanchan, Surangana and Gaurav in their respective roles and also praised Anujoy Chattopadhyay's short but strong performance.

Snigdha Dey of Aajkal reviewed the series and noted "Despite budget restraints and weak VFX, Parambrata and his team has given the best in this limited situation." She praised Kanchan's somatic performance as the tantric, Anujoy's traumatized performance, the background score and the lack of unnecessary jump scares but also mentioned that there could have been more fear inducing moments.

Shamayita Chakraborty of OTTplay rated the series 3/5 stars and highlighted "Parambrata's Nikosh Chaya is not just a better effort than his previous show Parnashavarir Shaap but also a step up in Bangla grotesque horror." She applauded the spooky background score, Kanchan Mullick and Chiranjeet's commanding performances in their respective roles and the acting mettle of Gaurav, Surangana and Anindita. But she criticized Chiranjeet's dialogues and diction, the filmsy conversations, barely scary body horror, the over simplistic storyline and predictable hallucination scenes.
