= Shororipu 2: Jotugriho =

Bengali psychological crime-thriller film

- Directed by: Ayan Chakraborty
- Written by: Ayan Chakraborty
- Produced by: Rupa Dutta
- Starring: Chiranjeet Chakraborty; Arunima Ghosh; Saswata Chatterjee
- Cinematography: Souvik Basu
- Edited by: Sujay Datta Ray
- Music by: Rupam Islam
- Production company: Camellia Productions
- Release date: 10 October 2021
- Country: India
- Language: Bengali

Shororipu 2: Jotugriho is a 2021 Indian Bengali-language psychological crime-thriller written and directed by Ayan Chakraborty. It is the second film in the Shororipu franchise. Rupa Dutta is the producer and Camellia Productions is the presenter. The film stars Chiranjeet Chakraborty, Arunima Ghosh, and Saswata Chatterjee in lead roles. The story follows a girl Megha (Ghosh), who was getting ready to marry her boyfriend but in a shocking turn of events she marries her father’s friend Debraj. After eight years of oppressed marriage life Debraj dies in mysterious circumstances. Detective Chandrakanta (played by Chakraborty) investigates the case.

== Plot ==
In a shocking turn of events, Megha, who was about to marry her boyfriend, is instead forced to wed Debraj, a friend of her father. Over the next eight years, she endures severe psychological torment at Debraj’s hands—until one day he is found dead. Is it an accident, or a calculated murder? Detective Chandrakanta is brought in to uncover the truth.

== Cast ==
- Chiranjeet Chakraborty as Detective Chandrakanta
- Arunima Ghosh as Megha
- Saswata Chatterjee as Debraj
- Rajesh Sharma as DCP
- Sourav Chakraborty
- Darshana Banik
- Debranjan Nag
- Biswajit Chakraborty
- Reetabrata Ghosh as Gaan-does
- Poulami Das

== Production ==
Ayan Chakraborti introduced a new detective in Bengali films detective Chandrakanta, in his crime thriller, Shororipu. Taking forward this franchise he announced the film in December 2018 titled as Shororipu 2 : Jotugriho. Chiranjeet Chakraborty will reprise the character with Arunima Ghosh Saswata Chatterjee, Rajesh Sharma, Darshana Banik, Sourav Chakraborty, Debranjan Nag, Poulami Das, Biswajit Chakraborty playing pivotal roles. Rupam Islam is the music composer of the film.

== Release ==
The film released theatrically on 10 October 2021 coinciding the Puja holidays.
