= Binodiini (film) =

2025 Indian Bengali biographical drama film by Ram Kamal Mukherjee

Binodiini: Ekti Natir Upakhyan
- Theatrical release poster
- Directed by: Ram Kamal Mukherjee
- Story by: Priyanka Poddar; Additional screenplay: Ram Kamal Mukherjee
- Produced by: Prateek Chakravorty; Dev
- Starring: Rukmini Maitr; Kaushik Ganguly; Rahul Bose; Om Sahani
- Narrated by: Sabyasachi Chakraborty
- Cinematography: Soumik Halder
- Edited by: Pronoy Dasgupta
- Music by: Sourendro Soumyojit
- Production companies: Dev Entertainment Ventures; Pramod Films; Assorted Motion Pictures
- Release date: 23 January 2025
- Running time: 151 minutes
- Country: India
- Language: Bengali
- Budget: ₹1.50 crore
- Box office: ₹2.55 crore

Binodiini, stylized as Binodiini: Ekti Natir Upakhyan (transl. Binodini: Tale of a Theater Artist), is a 2025 Indian Bengali-language epic biographical drama film co-written and directed by Ram Kamal Mukherjee in his directorial debut in Bengali cinema. Produced by Dev and Prateek Chakraborty under the banners of Dev Entertainment Ventures and Pramod Films respectively, in association with Assorted Motion Pictures, it stars Rukmini Maitr in the titular role with Kaushik Ganguly, Rahul Bose, Mir Afsar Ali, Chandan Roy Sanyal and Om Sahani in another pivotal roles.

The film narrates the life of the renowned theatre artist Binodini Dasi, celebrated for defying societal norms and conventions, and chronicles her journey from a courtesan to the queen of Bengali theatre, highlighting her struggles, passions, betrayals, and triumphs. It was announced in 2018, with principal photography commencing in February 2023 and concluding by the end of March the same year. Filming primarily took place in Kolkata, with some portions being filmed in Varanasi. The cinematography is helmed by Soumik Halder, while the musical score is composed by the duo Sourendro–Soumyojit.

Binodiini was released on 23 January 2025, coinciding with Netaji Jayanti alongside Shotyi Bole Shotyi Kichhu Nei.

== Cast ==
- Rukmini Maitr as Binodini Dasi
  - Swara Bhattacharya as Puti (younger Binodini)
- Kaushik Ganguly as Girish Chandra Ghosh
- Rahul Bose as Ranga Babu
- Mir Afsar Ali as Gurumukh Rai
- Chandan Roy Sanyal as Ramkrishna Paramhansa
- Om Sahani as Kumar Bahadur
- Gautam Halder as Dasu Neogi
- Chandrayee Ghosh as Ganga Bai
- Rupsa Chatterjee as Kanaklata
- Tapati Munshi as Binodini's grandmother
- Swati Mukherjee as Binodini's mother
- Ashim Roy Chowdhury as Rasaraj Amritalal

== Production ==
=== Announcement ===
The film was first announced by Ram Kamal Mukherjee in 2018. In September 2022, it was revealed that Rukmini Maitra had been cast in the lead role. The official announcement was made with a motion poster featuring Rukmini as Sri Chaitanya Mahaprabhu, one of the iconic characters portrayed by Binodini Dasi on stage. To prepare for the role, Rukmini learned Indian classical dance and studied several books about women of that era.

=== Development ===
Director Ram Kamal Mukherjee spent two years securing the necessary budget to bring this project to life. He also finalized the film's title by keeping only the first part of her name, as he wanted to challenge the traditional social structure in Bengal that labeled Brahmins as "Devi" and non-Brahmins as "Dasi." Mukherjee aimed to remove the term "Dasi" because, to him, she was not just a servant but a star in her own right. A Hindi biopic on Dasi was also planned by the late filmmaker Pradeep Sarkar, with Kangana Ranaut in the lead. However, the project was shelved following Sarkar's death in March 2023. The production design was managed by Tanmay Chakraborty, while the costumes were curated by Suchishmita Dasgupta.

=== Casting ===
Many speculation surrounded the casting of other key roles until February 2023, when the filmmakers announced that Kaushik Ganguly, Rahul Bose, Mir Afsar Ali, Chandan Roy Sanyal, and Om Sahani would play pivotal characters. Although shooting was initially scheduled to begin in 2019, the COVID-19 pandemic caused significant delays. Principal photography eventually commenced on February 12, 2023, accompanied by the release of a poster featuring Rukmini in a striking portrayal of Binodini Dasi, seated against a regal backdrop. To achieve this iconic look, a customized hair extension made from real hair sourced from the Tirupati temple in Andhra Pradesh was used. In March 2023, production faced another challenge when the entire cast and crew contracted viral fever, temporarily halting the shoot. However, filming resumed a week later in North Kolkata. The shoot was officially wrapped on 12 March 2023. Additionally, Shreya Ghosal recorded the song "Kanha" at Yash Raj Studios in Mumbai.

== Soundtrack ==
Binodiini: Ekti Natir Upakhyan

Soundtrack album by Sourendro–Soumyojit
- Released: 2025
- Recorded: 2024
- Studios: Studio Vibrations; BBAY Studio; S & S Music Room
- Genre: Film soundtrack
- Language: Bengali
- Label: Saregama Bengali

The music for the film is composed by the music duo Sourendro–Soumyojit, and the lyrics are penned by Ram Kamal Mukherjee. Ivy Banerjee and Tannishtha Sengupta have sung for the background score of this film, including tracks like "Binodini Theme" and "Ami Chai Na Re Tor", which is originally written by Binodiini herself.

The first single "Kanha" rendered by Shreya Ghoshal was released on 8 January 2025. The second song "Aaji Borosharo Raate" was released on 15 January 2025. The initial mukhda of the song has been adapted from an original composition of Rabindranath Tagore, titled Shaono Gagane Ghor. The third single titled "Hori Mon Mojaye" is release on 19 January 2025. Originally composed by Girish Chandra Ghosh and penned by Jatileswar Mukherjee, the song has been recreated by Sourendro–Soumyojit. "Bhaishya Zaibo" was released on 12 February 2025, post the theatrical release of the film.

Track listing
No.	Title	Singer(s)	Length
1.	"Kanha"	Shreya Ghoshal	5:48
2.	"Aaji Borosharo Raate"	Soumyojit Das, Anwesshaa Datta Gupta	3:42
3.	"Hori Mon Mojaye"	Shuchismita Chakraborty	4:52
4.	"Bhaisa Zaibo"	Rekha Bhardwaj	3:52

== Marketing ==
The teaser for Binodini: Ek Natir Upakhyan was released on the auspicious occasion of Diwali, on October 31, 2024. The teaser received praise for Maitra's powerful performance and dialogues, with the film drawing comparisons to Sanjay Leela Bhansali's Devdas. To mark the New Year, Sanyal's character poster was unveiled, featuring him as the Indian religious leader Ramakrishna Paramhansa. The poster was revealed at the iconic Star Theatre, which was later renamed Binodini Theatre in honor of the legendary actress Binodini Dasi. The film's first song, "Kanha," was released at a grand event at Ahindra Mancha in Kolkata, where Rukmini Maitra performed a live Kathak dance. The three-minute-long trailer was subsequently unveiled on 11 January 2025. In a groundbreaking moment for Bengali cinema, Chittanranjan Tripathy, the Dean of the National School of Drama, sent an official invitation letter to the director and lead actor, making it the first time a director has received such an invitation to promote a film. A special private screening was held at White Apple Studios in Mumbai a week prior to the release, where actor-director Ashutosh Gowariker and his wife Sunita Gowariker were the invited guests.

== Release ==
The film was initially scheduled to release on Pohela Boishakh 2023, the Bengali New Year. However, the makers announced a new release date in October 2024 with the unveiling of a motion poster. The film was finally released on 23 January 2025.

== Reception ==
Agnivo Niyogi of The Telegraph reviewed the film and noted "On paper, the story has everything going for it: a woman struggling to assert herself amid social prejudice, and a culturally rich backdrop. But the execution is uneven, with the performances and the tone sometimes veering towards melodrama. Maitr's delivery is often theatrical but she shines in the moments of quiet reflection." He applauded the cinematography by Halder but criticised the modern diction and accent of the actors which feels out of place, the over opulent visuals which are a distraction and the underwhelming music by Sourendro–Soumyojit.

Saptarshi Roy of Anandabazar Patrika rated the film 8/10 stars and reviewed the film as an imaginary letter from Binodiini Dasi if she would have watched the film. Subhasmita Kanji of the Hindustan Times rated the film 4 out of 5 stars and opined "Rukmini Maitr has not only portrayed but lived the character of Binodiini Dasi in this film. The strong points of the film are its music, background score and the dialogues." She also applauded all the remaining cast who were apt in their roles, specially Chandrayee Ghosh, Kaushik Ganguly and Om Sahani.

Poorna Banerjee of The Times of India rated the film 3/5 stars and wrote "The director has a rather dramatic vision of late 19th century Bengal. The story leaves out a lot of Binodini’s early struggles as an actress and focuses on the phase where she is already well-established. Rukmini Maitr is brilliant in parts as Binodini." She also praised Halder's cinematography as well as the well orchestrated music and gave a mixed opinion on the portrayal of the remaining cast. Sandipta Bhanja of Sangbad Pratidin reviewed the film and highlighted "Rukmini is the spine of the film, finely carved out by Ram Kamal Mukherjee."

== Awards ==
- Best Director, Best Actress, and Audience Choice Best Film at the South Asian International Film Festival of Florida (SAIFF) in 2025
- Best Critics Choice Award at the Indian International Film Festival of Boston, 2025.
- The Spirit of Bengal Award at the 8th London Bengali Film Festival, 2025.
