= Surangana Bandyopadhyay =

Indian actress and singer

- Born: 18 November 1997 (age 28); Madhyamgram, West Bengal, India
- Education: Julien Day School, Ganganagar
- Alma mater: St. Xavier's College, Kolkata
- Occupations: Actress; Singer
- Years active: 2008–present

Surangana Bandyopadhyay (Bengali: সুরাঙ্গনা বন্দ্যোপাধ্যায়; born 18 November 1997) is an Indian actress and singer who is primarily known for Bengali films and web series.

Surangana Bandyopadhyay made her on-screen debut as a child artist, though she started off her career as a dancer. At the age of nine, she was one of the semi-finalists in the first season of the dance reality show Dance Bangla Dance Junior, aired on Zee Bangla.

== Early life and education ==
Surangana Bandyopadhyay completed her school education in 2016 from an Anglo Indian Christian school, the Julien Day School in Madhyamgram. She completed her Bachelor's in English Literature from St. Xavier's College, Kolkata, and her Master's from St. Xavier's University, Kolkata.

== Career ==
=== Film ===
Bandyopadhyay's first on-screen appearance was in 2008 as a child artist. Her debut film was Aainaate (2008), directed by Dulal Dey. After it, she worked in Chirasathi (2008) directed by Haranath Chakraborty, Maati -O- Manush (2009) directed by Sisir Sahana, Jiban Rang Berang directed by Sanghamitra Chowdhury, Antim Swash Sundar (2010) directed by Kris Alin and others. In 2012, she worked in Goynar Baksho (2013) directed by Aparna Sen. She has also worked in Golpo Holeo Shotti (2014) directed by Birsa Dasgupta & Megher Meye (2013) directed by Pallab Kirtania. She gained recognition with the release of the Anindya Chatterjee directorial Open Tee Bioscope (2015), in which she also made her singing debut.

=== Television ===
Bandyopadhyay has also worked in Bengali mega-serials. The name of one such serial was Durga, which was aired on Star Jalsha.

== Filmography ==
=== Films ===
- All films are in Bengali language, unless mentioned

Year	Film	Director
2008	Aainaate	Dulal Dey
2008	Chirosathi	Haranath Chakraborty
2010	Mati O Manush	Sisir Sahana
2011	Jiban Rang Berang	
2013	Antim Swash Sundar	Kris Alin
2013	Megher Meye	Pallab Kirtania
2013	Goynar Baksho	Aparna Sen
2014	Golpo Holeo Shotti	Birsa Dasgupta
2015	Open Tee Bioscope	Anindya Chatterjee
2017	Samantaral	Partha Chakraborty
2020	Tiki Taka	Parambrata Chatterjee
2021	Bismillah	Indraadip Dasgupta
2021	Aloukik Abhijaan	Aranyak Chatterjee
2022	Ballavpurer Roopkotha	Anirban Bhattacharya
2025	Putulnacher Itikatha	Suman Mukhopadhyay

=== Web series ===
Year	Title	Role	Director	Platform	Language	Ref.
2019	Sharate Aaj	Titir	Aritra Sen	ZEE5	Bengali	
2023	Parnashavarir Shaap	Mitul	Parambrata Chatterjee	Hoichoi	Bengali	
2024	Advocate Achinta Aich	Malini Dutta	Joydeep Mukherjee	Hoichoi	Bengali	
2024	Nikosh Chhaya	Mitul	Parambrata Chatterjee	Hoichoi	Bengali	
2025	Detective Charulata	Charulata Mitra	Joydip Banerjee	Klikk	Bengali	
2025	Nishir Daak	Nishigandha Bhaduri and Nishi	Joydeep Mukherjee	Hoichoi	Bengali	
2026	Nikosh Chhaya 2	Mitul	Sayantan Ghosal	Hoichoi	Bengali	
2026	Shwetkali 2		Sani Ghose Ray	Zee5		

== Theatre performances ==
- Taraye Taraye, an adaptation of Srijato's novel Tara Bhora Akasher Niche, directed by Kaushik Sen, a Swapnasandhani production, 2018.
- Ekla Chawlo Re, an adaptation of Utpal Dutt's play of the same name, directed by Kaushik Sen, a Swapnasandhani production, 2019.

== Discography ==
Surangana has worked as a playback singer in several films and short films.

Surangana's Playback List
Year	Name	Composer	Film/Series	Co-singer	Language
2015	Tor Jonyo	Prasen	Open Tee Bioscope	Prasen	Bengali
2018	Aaloshyo	Anupam Roy	Uma		Bengali
2020	Kon Gopone	Anindya Chatterjee	Brahma Janen Gopon Kommoti		Bengali
2020	Thikanar Khonje	Anindya Chatterjee	Thikana (Short Film)		Bengali
2022	Notun Premer Gaan	Debraj Bhattacharya	Ballabhpurer Roopkotha	Debraj Bhattacharya	Bengali
2022	Durottwo	Ranajoy Bhattacharjee	Prasenjit Weds Rituparna	Ranajoy Bhattacharjee	Bengali

=== Music videos ===
- Surangana acted in the music video of Anupam Roy's 'Putul Aami' in the year 2022 with Riddhi Sen.
- Daughter Of Clouds (2015)
- Thikana (2020)
