= Khasi Katha– A Goat Saga =

- Theatrical release poster (banner)
- Directed by: Judhajit Sarkar
- Written by: Judhajit Sarkar
- Starring: Naseeruddin Shah, Anindita Bose
- Production company: Star Fire Movies
- Release date: March 2013
- Country: India
- Language: Bengali

Khasi Katha– A Goat Saga is a 2013 Bengali film. The film is directed by Judhajit Sarkar and produced by Star Fine Movies. The film was scheduled to be released in March 2013. The film shows a talkative goat, about to be slaughtered telling a story of a woman boxer of Kolkata to the butcher.

Naseeruddin Shah plays the character of butcher and Anindita Bose plays the character of woman boxer.

== Plot ==
The film begins with a scene where a butcher is going to slaughter a goat. The goat becomes talkative and pleads with the butcher for life and promises to tell a story in return. The butcher is surprised but agrees. The goat now tells the butcher the story of a female boxer Salma who belongs to a lower-middle-class family and dreams to become a boxer.

== Cast ==
- Naseeruddin Shah as the butcher
- Anindita Bose as Salma (boxer)
- Subhasish Mukherjee
- Prasun Gayen
- Silajit Majumder
- Biswanath Basu
- Anindya Bandyopadhyay
- Mir Afsar Ali
- Joy Badlani
- Sanjoy Sinharoy

== Production ==
Judhajit Sarkar made a documentary film on woman boxers of Kolkata few years back. At that time he felt this subject would be interesting to make a full-length film. Sarkar explained, boxing is a game where the player accepts physical punishment voluntarily and it becomes more thrilling when a woman does it.

== Casting ==
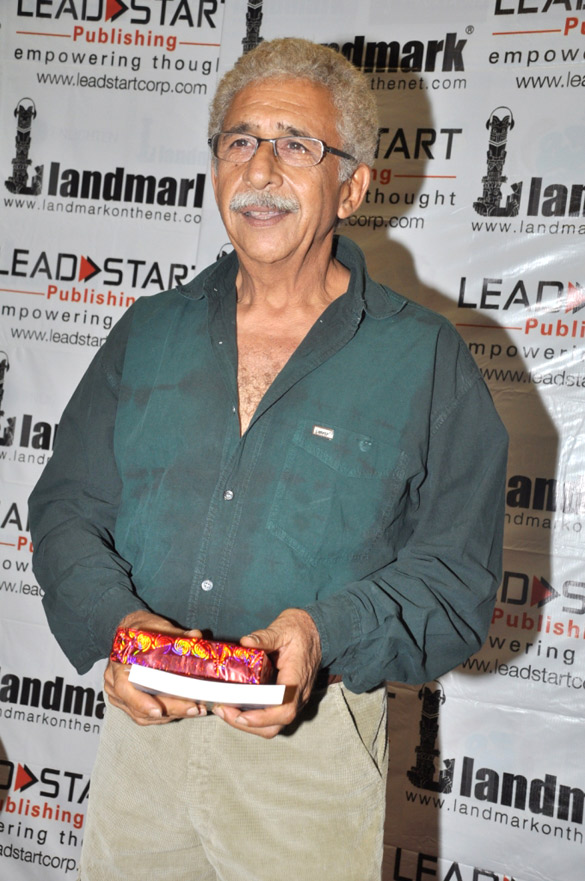
Naseeruddin Shah plays the character of the butcher in this film. Shah agreed to act in the film immediately after hearing the character he was offered.

Naseeruddin Shah plays the role of the butcher. Sarkar worked with Shah in Vidhu Vinod Chopra’s film Sazaaye Maut where Sarkar worked as an assistant. After collecting money for the film Sarkar contacted Shah and asked if he wanted to play the character. Shah agreed to act in the film immediately upon learning about the character he was offered.

Anindita Bose plays the character of woman boxer. Bose and another actor Daminee took boxing training for a month to prepare themselves for their characters.

== See also ==
- Nobel Chor, a 2012 Bengali-language film
