= Chiranjeet Chakraborty =

Indian politician and actor

Member of West Bengal Legislative Assembly
- In office 24 May 2011 – 4 May 2026
- Preceded by: Dr. Bithika Mondal
- Succeeded by: Sankar Chatterjee
- Constituency: Barasat

Personal details
- Born: 2 November 1955 (age 71)
- Citizenship: Indian
- Party: All India Trinamool Congress
- Spouse: Ratnabali Chakrabarty
- Occupation: Actor, director, politician

Deepak Chakraborty (born 2 November 1955), known professionally as Chiranjeet Chakraborty, is an Indian actor and director in the Bengali film industry located in Kolkata, West Bengal. He is the son of renowned cartoonist Shaila Chakraborty. He is also a politician and a Member of the Legislative Assembly of Government of West Bengal. He has been conferred upon the prestigious Mahanayak Samman by the Govt. of West Bengal in 2012.

He made his debut with the 1981 film Sonay Sohaga. It was a box office failure. He gained popularity after starring in Anjan Choudhury's 1984 film Shatru. His first hit in a lead role was the 1985 film Antarale. After that, he had a series of hits in his career like Pratikar, Prateek, Paapi, Paap Punya, Beder Meye Josna, Amarkantak, Jeeban Jouban, Bhoy, Shaitan, Pennam Kolkata, Bedenir Prem , Tridhara, Jeeban Joddha, Phiriye Dao, Agnitrishna, Shakti, Rakte Lekha, Rakta Nadir Dhara, Tomar Rakte Amar Sohaag, Trishul, Chotushkone and many others.

He got a turning point in his career after starring in Rituparno Ghosh's 2000 film Bariwali. He is also a famous stage artist. Chakraborty is considered to be one of the most successful actors in the history of Bengali Cinema.

== Education and early career ==
Chiranjeet completed his Higher Secondary from Mitra Institution (Main). He studied B.E. in Architecture from Jadavpur University, but did not appear for his final examination. He has worked for Desh magazine and as a newsreader on TV. He is married and has a daughter.

== Political career ==
Chiranjeet contested the 2011 West Bengal state assembly election in Barasat Constituency for All India Trinamool Congress and won the seat. In March 2021, Mamata Banerjee announced Chiranjeet would contest from Barasat Vidan Sabha constituency in the West Bengal Legislative Assembly Election 2021. Chakraborty regained the Barasat constituency as AITC candidate after defeating BJP candidate Sankar Chatterjee with a margin of 23,783 votes as declared on 2 May 2021. As of 2024, he is a Member of the Legislative Assembly of Government of West Bengal. In 2022, he expressed his opinion regarding Partha Chatterjee's arrest.

== Film career ==
=== As director ===
- Maryada (1989)
- Phiriye Dao (1994)
- Sansar Sangram (1995)
- Kencho Khunrte Keute (1995)
- Bhoy (1996)
- Bastir Meye Radha (2000)
- Manush Amanush (2002)

=== As actor ===
- Sonay Sohaga (1981)
- Sandhan (1982)
- Prafulla (1982)
- Din Jaye (1983)
- Ashlilatar Daye (1983)
- Shatru (1984)
- Samarpita (1984)
- Sonar Sansar (1985)
- Harishchandra Shaibya (1985)
- Antarale (1985)
- Prem O Paap (1986)
- Madhumoy (1986)
- Jiban (1986)
- Artanad (1986)
- Amar Kantak (1986)
- Pratikar (1987)
- Paap Punya (1987)
- Mouna Mukhar (1987)
- Gayak (1987)
- Pratik (1988)
- Madhuganjer Sumati (1988)
- Hirer Shikal (1988)
- Boba Sanai (1988)
- Aghat (1988)
- Tufan (1989)
- Shatrupaksha (1989)
- Nishibadhu (1989)
- Maryada (1989)
- Mahapith Tarapith (1989)
- Asha (1989)
- Agnitrishna (1989)
- Papi (1990)
- Jowar Bhanta (1990)
- Gharer Bou (1990)
- Sindur (1991)
- Beder Meye Josna (1991)
- Shaitan (1992)
- Rakte Lekha (1992)
- Pitrireen (1992)
- Pennam Kolkata (1992)
- Bedenir Prem (1992)
- Tomar Rakte Aamar Sohag (1993)
- Shanka (1993)
- Shakti (1993)
- Samparka (1993)
- Maan Samman (1993)
- Kanyadan (1993)
- Ghar Sansar (1993)
- Rakta Nadir Dhara (1994)
- Phiriye Dao (1994)
- Lal Paan Bibi (1994)
- Danga (1994)
- Biswas Abiswas (1994)
- Atikram (1994)
- Sansar Sangram (1995)
- Rakhal Raja (1995)
- Prem Sanghat (1995)
- Naginkanya (1995)
- Mashal (1995)
- Kumari Maa (1995)
- Kencho Khunrte Keute (1995)
- Jiban Yoddha (1995)
- Abirbhab (1995)
- Tridhara (1996)
- Joy Bijoy (1996)
- Bhoy (1996)
- Bhai Amar Bhai (1996)
- Beyadap (1996)
- Yoddha (1997)
- Sedin Chaitramas (1997)
- Sabar Upare Maa (1997)
- Pita Mata Santan (1997)
- Nishpap Asami (1997)
- Jiban Jouban (1997)
- Chandragrahan (1997)
- Mayer Dibyi (1998)
- Lola Lusi (1998)
- Bishnu Narayan (1998)
- Sindur Khela (1999)
- Sankha Sindurer Dibyi (1999)
- Rajdanda (1999)
- Mastan Raja (1999)
- Dadabhai (1999)
- Trishul (2000)
- Rupasi Dohai Tomar (2000)
- Dharma Adharma (2000)
- Debanjali (2000)
- Chakrabyuha (2000)
- Bastir Meye Radha (2000)
- Srimoti Bhayonkari (2001)
- Prem Pratigya (2001)
- Ostad (2001)
- Mastermasai (2001)
- Hatiyar (2001)
- Bhalobasar Rajprasade (2001)
- Bariwali (2001)
- Manush Amanush (2002)
- Inquilaab (2002)
- Abaidha (2002)
- Chor O Bhagoban (2003)
- Atotayee (2004)
- Chore Chore Mastuto Bhai (2005)
- Abhinetri (2006)
- Antarotamo (2008)
- 1 No. Plum Villa (2009)
- Sesh Sanghat (2009)
- Gudly (2010)
- Antarbas (2010)
- Rose Craze Rose (2010)
- Jibon Rang Berang (2011)
- Boss (2013)
- 10th July (2014)
- Bindaas (2014)
- Kusum Tumi Amar (2013)- Unreleased
- Chotushkone (2014)
- Cornel (2013)- Unreleased
- Monihara (2015)
- Abby Sen (2015)
- Shororipu (2016)
- Kiriti Roy (2016)
- Chaamp (2017)
- Boss 2: Back to Rule (2017)
- Jagga Jasoos (2017) (Hindi)
- Rongberonger Korhi (2018)
- Rosogolla (2018)
- Baccha Shoshur (2019)
- Surjo Prithibir Chardike Ghore (2019)
- Buro Sadhu (2019)
- Water Bottle (2019) (Web Series)
- Daawat-e-Biryani (2019)
- Shororipu 2: Jotugriho (2020)
- Unicorn (2021)
- Parnashavarir Shaap (2023) (Web Series)
- Dabaru (2024)
- Nikosh Chhaya (2024)
- Dhumketu (2025)
- Haati Haati Paa Paa (2025)
- Vijaynagar'er Hirey (2026)
- Nikosh Chhaya 2 (2026)

== Awards ==
- Kalakar Awards-Best Actor Award for Ghar Sansar in 1993
- Kalakar Awards-Best Director Award for Sansar Sangram in 1996
- Kalakar Awards-Best Actor Award in 2000
- BFJA Award-Best Actor Award for Abaidha in 2002
- Kalakar Awards-Best Actor Award for Manus Amanus in 2003
- Kalakar Awards-Best Actor Award (Television) for Mushkil Assan in 2006
- BFJA Awards-Best Actor Award for Abaidha in 2003
- Bharat Nirman Award in 2011
- Mahanayak Samman in 2012

State Legislative Assembly
Preceded by Bithika Mondal	Member of the West Bengal Legislative Assembly from Barasat Assembly constituency 2011 –	Incumbent
