= Parnashavarir Shaap =

2023 Indian Bengali web series

- Release Poster
- Genre: Folk horror; Supernatural Horror
- Based on: Parnashavarir Shaap by Souvik Chakraborty
- Screenplay by: Sreejib
- Directed by: Parambrata Chattopadhyay
- Starring: Chiranjeet Chakraborty; Surangana Bandyopadhyay; Gaurav Chakraborty; Anindita Bose; Arno Mukhopadhyay
- Theme music composer: Nabarun Bose
- Composer: Nabarun Bose
- Country of origin: India
- Original language: Bengali
- No. of seasons: 1
- No. of episodes: 7

Production
- Producers: Parambrata Chattopadhyay; Aritra Sen
- Cinematography: Prasenjit Chowdhury
- Editor: Sumit Chowdhury
- Running time: 21-29 minutes
- Production company: Roadshow Films

Original release
- Release: 10 November 2023

Parnashavarir Shaap (transl. Parnashavari's Curse) is a 2023 Indian Bengali mythological folk horror web series directed by Parambrata Chatterjee. Based on an eponymous story by Souvik Chakraborty from Sunday Suspense, the series has been produced under the banner of Roadshow Films. Sreejib handled the writing and screenplay. This series marked the OTT debut of Chiranjeet Chakraborty.

The story depicts an idyllic hillside vacation that turns into a terrifying nightmare when four friends face the wrath of a vengeful ancient deity. Nabarun Bose composed the music of the film. The cinematography was done by Prasenjit Chowdhury while Sumit Chowdhury handled the editing. The series was streamed in 10 November 2023 on the occasion of Bhoot Chaturdashi, on the Bengali OTT platform Hoichoi.

== Overview ==
A group of four friends - Amiyo, Mitul, Titas, and Pallav travel to Chamakpur in North Bengal for a vacation. An ancient religious relic gets disturbed unintentionally. Consequently, Mitul started showing signs of supernatural possession. So, the group sought assistance from Bhaduri Moshai, an occult expert. He identified the reason. It was the curse of Devi Parnashavari, who is a Hindu and Buddhist deity, associated with epidemics protection. Further investigation found that the evil force was triggered by human greed within the sacred forest, in the past. Bhaduri Moshai utilized his knowledge of tantra and mythology to confront the deity and neutralized the curse.

== Cast ==
- Chiranjeet Chakraborty as Nirendranath Bhaduri a.k.a. Bhaduri Moshai, an occult expert
- Surangana Bandyopadhyay as Mitul, who gets possessed by a spirit
- Gaurav Chakraborty as Amiya, Mitul's lover
- Anindita Bose as Titas, a General Physician
- Arno Mukhopadhyay as Pallab

== Production ==
=== Development and announcement ===
Parnashavarir Shaap was announced on the seventh anniversary of Hoichoi on 29 September 2023. It marked the OTT debut of Chiranjeet Chakraborty. The series is an adaptation of an eponymous story by Souvik Chakraborty but has its own take in the plotline.

In an interview, Chiranjeet Chakraborty shared why he accepted the series and how did he prepare for the role — "For me, the important thing is who the maker is and the script. I liked the script and the director, so naturally I said yes. I read the novel. After reading the script and the book, I had in mind the mannerisms of Bhaduri Moshai… how he walks, talks and behaves. I have been doing this for the past 50 years, so it comes to me naturally."

Anindita Bose was cast to play a general physician. Bose told in an interview that she agreed to the series because she was excited that Parambrata was directing in the horror genre, in which she has never worked before.

This marked the second collaboration between Surangana Bandyopadhyay and Chiranjeet Chakraborty after Jibon Rong Berong, in which Surangana was a child artist. This marked collaboration between Parambrata Chatterjee and Chiranjeet nine years after Chotushkone (2014).

=== Filming ===
"The most challenging part for me was to figure out a voice that is convincing and stick with it. Because after hours of shooting, your voice breaks completely. Another challenge was not to ignore the character before the possession. Because if I kept focusing on just the scenes where my character is possessed and worked on that, chances are I would have ignored the rest of the scenes where the character is actually present."

— Surangana Bandyopadhyay, sharing her shooting experience

The series was mostly shot in the high hills of Takdah at night time. Chiranjeet shared his one filming experience "I had to climb up to the place where we were shooting. It would rain heavily. Half of my energy went on doing that, else I would have been able to concentrate more on the acting part. I used to get distracted and disturbed."

Sandeep Neogy served as the makeup artist, who did the post possession look for Surangana. She consulted the Nepali actor who played Pema in the series Mabo Hang, to figure out the exact intonation and throw of her lines in Nepali, after being possessed.

== Episodes ==
No.	Title	Directed by	Written by	Original release date
1	"Obhishopto Chamakpur"	Parambrata Chatterjee	Sreejib	November 10, 2023
2	"Ke Tui?"	Parambrata Chatterjee	Sreejib	November 10, 2023
3	"Lajja Korche"	Parambrata Chatterjee	Sreejib	November 10, 2023
4	"Agniparikhha"	Parambrata Chatterjee	Sreejib	November 10, 2023
5	"Abhaya Mudra"	Parambrata Chatterjee	Sreejib	November 10, 2023
6	"Aboron"	Parambrata Chatterjee	Sreejib	November 10, 2023
7	"Shaapmochon"	Parambrata Chatterjee	Sreejib	November 10, 2023

== Marketing ==
The teaser was released on 13 October 2023. The name of lead cast was announced along with it. Special screening for the series was held on 9 November 2023 at the Satyajit Ray Film and Television Institute. The trailer was launched on 30 October 2023. The trailer launch event was held at an old dilapidated zamindar bari in North Kolkata.

Chiranjeet and Parambrata collaborated with historian Nrisingha Prasad Bhaduri to discuss the myths, legends, folklore and history behind deity Parnashavari who is believed to be an incarnation of deity Tara. Over time, she became a Shavar goddess with Dionysiac rituals.

== Reception ==
=== Critical reception ===
Agnivo Niyogi of The Telegraph reviewed the series and wrote "Parnashavarir Shaap, Parambrata Chattopadhyay’s maiden web series as director for Hoichoi, is a horror mystery that keeps you more or less hooked through its entire runtime." He praised Chiranjeet as a occult practitioner, Parambrata's direction, presence of backstories for each of the characters, small comical moments that's a breather in an environment of tension and cinematography and the soundscape that "creates a sense of otherworldliness".

Archi Sengupta of Leisure Byte rated the series 3/5 stars and opined "Parnashavarir Shaap is a good mystery that is watchable for most of its runtime. The story is a bit cliched, and there are practically no scares, but it has a tense atmosphere." She praised the backstory provided for the characters, the cliched yet interesting premise, the cinematography, Chiranjeet's performance and Mitul's makeup after being possessed by a spirit but criticized the usage of too many long dialogues for Bhaduri Moshai's character, easy deductions, dramatization of a thriller, flat twists, weird interaction between Bhaduri Moshai and Pallab in the last episode, cliched direction and fatigued dialogue delivery in the last episode.

Torsha Bhattacharyya of ABP Ananda rated the series 3.5/5 stars and noted "The best part about the series is the sooky environment which director Parambrata Chattopadhyay has created." She applauded Chiranjeet's seasoned acting, the social message portrayed against superstitions, Surangana's performance, the filming of the possessed scenes, the cinematography, colour palette, background score and the display of local culture but bemoaned the lack of enough screen-time for Surangana's friends and minor loopholes in the plotline.

Sandipta Bhanja of Sangbad Pratidin reviewed the series and wrote "If one doesn't respect humanity, the God also doesn't forgive that person - Parambrata Chatterjee has presented that story in the form of a revenge thriller drama and has left an impression in his first web series as a director." She praised the haunted atmosphere maintained through all the episodes, cinematography, lighting, background score, Chiranjeet and Surnagana's performances and the night scene designs. Sushmita Dey of Ei Samay reviewed the series and highlighted "Despite many loopholes in the story, the sound structure, visual effects and the performances makes this series a visual treat."

== Sequel ==
Chiranjeet Chakraborty hinted at the trailer launch event that this series could turn into a franchise if the first season becomes successful. The sequel of this series, titled Nikosh Chhaya was released on 29 October 2024, on the Bengali OTT platform Hoichoi.
