= Anindita Bose =

Indian actress (born 1986)

- Born: Kolkata, India
- Education: Sir J J School of Art
- Occupation: Actress
- Years active: 2008–present
- Notable work: Role Jhinuk in Gaaner Oparey
- Spouses: Gourab Chatterjee (m. 2013; div. 2015) Abhimanyu Mukherjee (m. 2015; div. 2017)
- Partner: Saurav Das (2017–2022)

Anindita Bose is an Indian actress in Bengali-language film and television. She started her acting career in television and then moved to the big screen. In 2012 she acted in the film Bhooter Bhabishyat.

== Career ==
Bose started her acting career in television and acted in serials like Gaaner Oparey and she was also seen in Bou Kotha Kou. Bose made her big screen debut with the 2010 Bengali film Clerk. In 2012, she acted in the commercially successful film Bhooter Bhabishyat.

== Filmography ==
Year	Title	Role	Notes
2008	Ghatothkach	young Gajju (voice)	Marathi version
2010	Clerk		
2011	Jaani Dyakha Hawbe		
2012	Bhooter Bhabishyat		
2012	Hemlock Society		
2013	Khasi Katha- A Goat Sage		
2016	Guti Malhar		
2017	Dum Dum Digha Digha		
2017	Guti Malharer Atithi		
2018	Rhododendron		
2019	Cakewalk		Short film
2019	Sotoroi September		
2019	Shesh Theke Shuru	Pujarini's friend	
2020	Love Aaj Kal Porshu	Leena	
2020	Saheber Cutlet	Vania	
2022	Ajker Shortcut		
2023	Aaro Ek Prithibi	Ayesha	
2023	The Rapist	Malini	
2025	The Storyteller		

== Television ==
Title	Role	Notes
Gaaner Oparey	Jhinuk Sanyal	
Bou Kotha Kao	Nalini Chowdhury	
Adwitiya	Indira Chowdhury / Ratri Mukherjee	
Ghore Pherar Gaan	Eshna	
Kanamachi	Sania	
Raadha	Kankana / Kakon	
Swapno Udaan	Ritika	
Prothoma Kadambini	Anandi Bai	

== Short films ==
Year	Title	Role	Network	Notes
	Kidnapped		Addatimes	
2018	Boomerang		Hoichoi	
2019	Thinkistan	Sharmishta Sen		
2020	East Style With Anindita- A SVF YouTube Series			

== Web series ==
Year	Title	Role	Network
2018	Gariahater Ganglords	Monalisa	Hoichoi
2018	Hurdle Hawk	Host	Addatimes
2018	Virgin Mohito	Nina	Addatimes
2019	Skyfire	Vaishali Dharma	ZEE5
2020	Paatal Lok	Chanda Mukherjee	Amazon Prime
2020	Mafia	Neha	ZEE5
2020	Break Up Story		Hoichoi
2020	Forbidden Love		ZEE5
2021	Ray	Riya Saran	Netflix
2021	Murder In The Hills	Shiela	Hoichoi
2023	Parnashavarir Shaap	Titas	Hoichoi
2024	Nikosh Chhaya	Titas	Hoichoi
2025	Lojja	Sneha Roy	Hoichoi
2026	Nikosh Chhaya 2	Titas	Hoichoi
