= Rukmini Maitr =

Indian actress and model (born 1991)

Rukmini Maitra
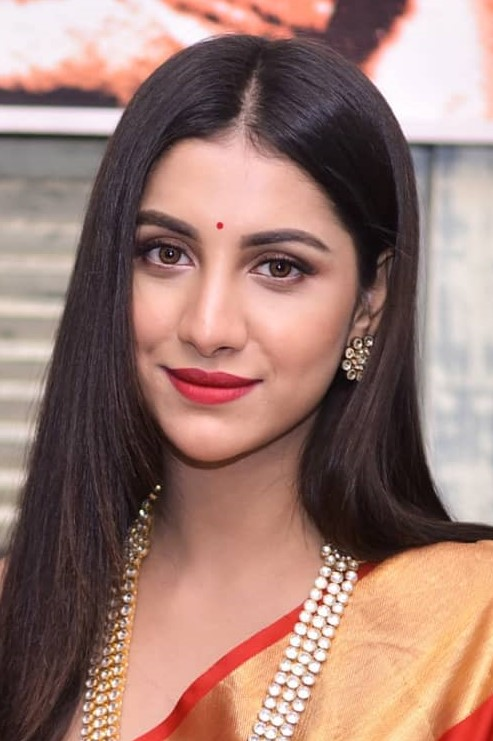
- Maitra in 2025
- Born: Rukmini Maitra; Kolkata, West Bengal, India
- Other name: Rukmini Maitr
- Education: Carmel High School, Kolkata
- Occupations: Actress, model
- Years active: 2017–present
- Notable work: Switzerland; Haati Haati Paa Paa; Binodiini: Ekti Natir Upakhyan
- Partner: Dev (2017–present)

Rukmini Maitr (born as Maitra) is an Indian actress, who primarily works in Tollywood and Bollywood. Maitr made her debut in films in 2017 with the Bengali film Chaamp. She acted in eight films with Dev. She had her Bollywood debut opposite Vidyut Jammwal in the 2021 film Sanak.

== Career ==
Maitr started her career as a model at the age of 13. She has modelled for various regional, national and international brands and magazines such as Reliance, Lakmé, Vodafone, Sunsilk, Parachute, Titan, Tata Tea, Rado, Elle, Harper's Bazaar, Femina, Royal Stag, PC Chandra Jewellers, Bhima Jewellers, Azva, Senco Gold, Spencer's, ITC, Fiama Di Wills, Big Bazar Fb, Lux, Emami, and has also modelled for fashion designers like Masaba Gupta, Anita Dongre, Suneet Varma, Dev r Nil, Anju Modi etc.

Maitr debuted on the silver screen with the Bengali film Champ opposite Bengali actor Dev, which released on Eid 2017. The film was directed by Raj Chakraborty. It is based on boxing, a theme explored in Bengali cinema for the first time.

== Personal life ==
Maitr is in a relationship with fellow actor Dev.

In May 2026, she announced on social media that she had changed her surname to Maitr from Maitra.

== Filmography ==
=== Film ===
Key
Denotes films that have not yet been released

Year	Title	Role	Language	Notes	Ref
2017	Chaamp	Jaya Sanyal	Bengali		
2017	Cockpit	Kirti Sachdev	Bengali	Also credited as Rukmini	
2018	Kabir	Yasmin Khatun	Bengali		
2019	Kidnap	Meghna Chatterjee	Bengali		
2019	Password	Nisha Chatterjee	Bengali		
2020	Switzerland	Rumi	Bengali		
2021	Sanak	Anshika Maitra	Hindi	Bollywood Debut	
2022	Kishmish	Rohini Sen	Bengali		
2023	Byomkesh O Durgo Rahasya	Satyabati	Bengali		
2024	Crakk	Herself	Hindi	Special Appearance	
2024	Boomerang	Ishaa Sen / Nisha	Bengali		
2024	Tekka	Maya Khastogir	Bengali		
2025	Binodiini	Binodini Dasi	Bengali		
2025	Haati Haati Paa Paa	Madhura	Bengali		
2026	Mon Maaney Na	Binodini	Bengali	Special Appearance	
2026	Bike Ambulance Dada †	Anju	Bengali	Completed	
2027	Samuk †	TBA	Hindi	Filming	

=== Reality shows ===
Year	Title	Role	Language	Ref.
2017	Didi No. 1	Guest	Bengali	
2017	Dadagiri Unlimited	Guest	Bengali	
2017	Apur Sangsar	Guest	Bengali	
2020	Mirakkel	Guest	Bengali	
2022	Rannaghar	Guest	Bengali	
2022	Didi No. 1	Contestant	Bengali	
2022	Dadagiri Unlimited	Contestant	Bengali	
2022	Ismart Jodi	Guest	Bengali	
2022	Dance Dance Junior Season 3	Judge	Bengali	

== Awards and nominations ==
Year	Award	Category	Film	Result	Ref.
2017	The Times of India	Calcutta Times Most Desirable Woman of 2017		Won	
2017	The Times of India	The Times 50 Most Desirable Women 2017		Won	
2018	Jio Filmfare Awards East	Best Debut (Female)	Chaamp, Cockpit	Won	
2018	The Times of India	Times Power Women – Most Promising Actor 2018		Won	
2018	Bengal Film Journalists' Association Awards	Bengal Film Journalists' Awards – Most Promising Actress 2018		Won	

== See also ==
- Cinema of West Bengal
