= Barasat Assembly constituency =

Barasat
- Constituency No. 119 for the West Bengal Legislative Assembly
- Interactive Map Outlining Barasat Assembly Constituency

Constituency details
- Country: India
- Region: East India
- State: West Bengal
- District: North 24 Parganas
- Lok Sabha constituency: Barasat
- Established: 1951
- Total electors: 208,810
- Reservation: None

Member of Legislative Assembly
- 18th West Bengal Legislative Assembly
- Incumbent Sankar Chatterjee
- Party: BJP
- Elected year: 2026
- Preceded by: Chiranjeet Chakraborty

Barasat Assembly constituency is an assembly constituency in North 24 Parganas district in the Indian state of West Bengal.

Most Successful parties from Barasat assembly
1. All India Forward Block (9 times) (50.0%)
2. Indian National Congress (4 times) (22.2%)
3. All India Trinamool Congress (4 times) (22.2%)
4. Bharatiya Janata Party (1 time) (5.50%)

== Overview ==
As per orders of the Delimitation Commission, No. 119 Barasat Assembly constituency is composed of the following: Barasat municipality and Chhota Jagulia gram panchayat of Barasat I community development block,

Barasat Assembly constituency is part of No. 17 Barasat Lok Sabha constituency.

== Members of the Legislative Assembly ==
Year	Name	Party
1951	Amulya Dhan Mukhopadhyay	Indian National Congress
1957	Chitta Basu	All India Forward Bloc
1962	Ashok Krishna Dutt	Indian National Congress
1967	H.K. Basu	All India Forward Bloc
1969	Saral Deb	All India Forward Bloc
1971	Saral Deb	All India Forward Bloc
1972	Kanti Rangan Chatterjee	Indian National Congress
1977	Saral Deb	All India Forward Bloc
1982	Saral Deb	All India Forward Bloc
1987	Saral Deb	All India Forward Bloc
1991	Saral Deb	All India Forward Bloc
1996	Ashoke Mukherjee	Indian National Congress
2001	Ashoke Mukherjee	Trinamool Congress
2006	Dr. Bithika Mondal	All India Forward Bloc
2011	Chiranjeet Chakraborty	Trinamool Congress
2016	Chiranjeet Chakraborty	Trinamool Congress
2021	Chiranjeet Chakraborty	Trinamool Congress
2026	Sankar Chatterjee	Bharatiya Janata Party

== Election results ==
=== 2026 ===
2026 West Bengal Legislative Assembly election: Barasat
Party	Candidate	Votes	%	±%
BJP	Sankar Chatterjee	122,171	51.64	▲15.91
AITC	Sabyasachi Dutta	87,613	37.03	▼9.24
AIFB	Hemanta Das	18,700	7.9	▼7.24
INC	Tarak Mukherjee	2,252	0.95	
NOTA	None of the above	1,543	0.65	▼0.54
Majority		34,558	14.61	▲4.07
Turnout		236,603	93.64	▲12.91
BJP gain from AITC		Swing		

=== 2021 ===
West Bengal assembly elections, 2021: Barasat constituency
Party	Candidate	Votes	%	±%
AITC	Chiranjeet Chakraborty	104,431	46.27	
BJP	Sankar Chatterjee	80,648	35.73	
AIFB	Sanjib Chatterjee	34,171	15.14	
NOTA	None of the above	2,688	1.19	
Majority		23,783	10.54	
Turnout		225,707	80.73	
AITC hold		Swing		

=== 2016 ===
West Bengal assembly elections, 2016: Barasat constituency
Party	Candidate	Votes	%	±%
AITC	Chiranjeet Chakraborty	99,667	48.44	▼9.84
AIFB	Sanjib Chatterjee	74,668	36.29	▲0.55
BJP	Dr. Bithika Mandal	22,537	10.95	▲7.61
BSP	Sunil Chandra Roy	2,827	1.37	▲0.08
Majority		24,999	15.15	▼7.39
Turnout		205,770	82.93	
AITC hold		Swing		

=== 2011 ===
In the 2011 election, Chiranjeet of Trinamool Congress defeated his nearest rival Sanjib Chatterjee of Forward Bloc.

West Bengal assembly elections, 2011: Barasat constituency
Party	Candidate	Votes	%	±%
AITC	Chiranjeet Chakraborty	103,954	58.28	+9.46#
AIFB	Sanjib Chatterjee	63,743	35.74	−11.02
BJP	Tuhin Kumar Mondal	5,957	3.34	
BSP	Tapan Sarkar	2,302	1.29	
Independent	Bablu Jana	1,584	0.89	
SAP	Ramtanay Bhattacharya	823	0.46	
Majority		40,211	22.54	
Turnout		178,363	85.42	
AITC gain from AIFB		Swing	20.48#	

.# Swing calculated on Congress+Trinamool Congress vote percentages taken together in 2006.

=== 2006 ===
In the 2006 state assembly elections, Dr. Bithika Mondal of Forward Bloc won the Barasat assembly seat defeating her nearest rival Ashoke Mukherjee of Trinamool Congress. Contests in most years were multi cornered but only winners and runners are being mentioned. Ashoke Mukherjee of Trinamool Congress defeated Saral Deb of Forward Bloc in 2001 and 1996. Saral Deb of Forward Bloc defeated Souren Sen of Congress in 1991, Amar Chandar Deb of Congress in 1987, Ashis Kumar Basu of Congress in 1982, and Kanti Ranjan Chattopadhyay in of Congress in 1977.

=== 1972 ===
Kanti Rangan Chatterjee of Congress won in 1972. Saral Deb of Forward Bloc won in 1971 and 1969. H.K.Basu of Forward Bloc won in 1967. Ashok Krishna Dutt of Congress won in 1962.Chitta Basu of Forward Bloc won in 1957. In independent India's first election in 1951, Amulya Dhan Mukhopadhyay of Congress won the Barasat seat.
