= Netaji Subhash Vidyaniketan =

Tripura higher secondary school

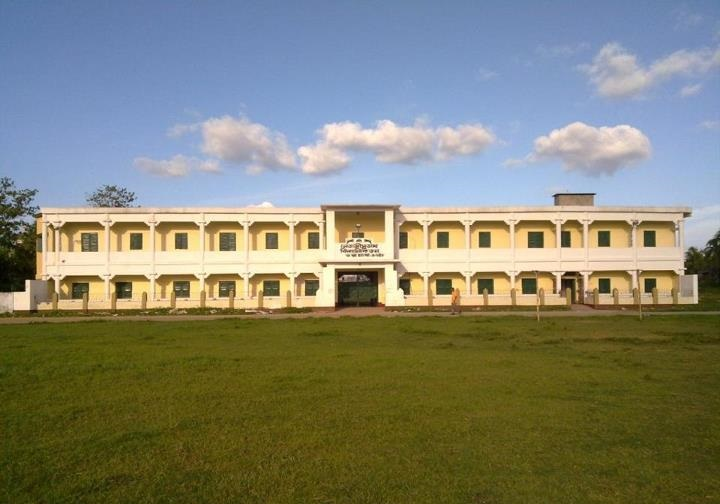
The School

Netaji Subhash Vidyaniketan is a higher secondary school of Tripura, a state in north-east India. It is located in Agartala, the capital of Tripura. NSV offers courses from the 1st standard till the 12th standard. It is affiliated to Tripura Board of Secondary Education. The school is named after the freedom fighter of Indian independence movement, Netaji Subhas Chandra Bose.

== History ==
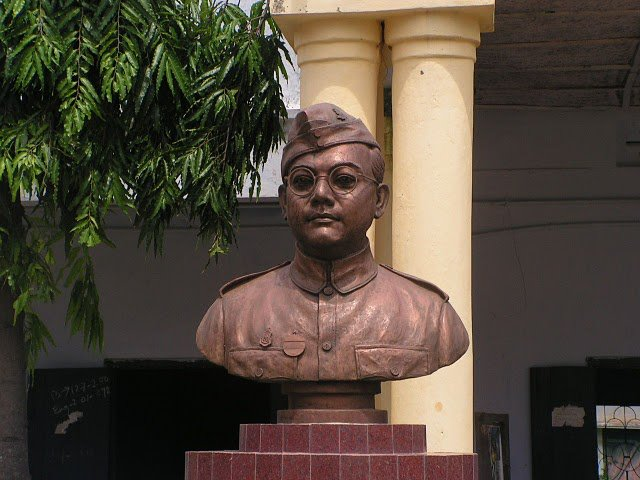
Netaji Statue in front of the cultural hall (Sanskriti Bhavan)

Netaji Subhash Vidyaniketan was established in 1948. The founding patrons of the school were inspired by the ideologies of the Indian freedom fighter Netaji Subhas Chandra Bose. They aimed to set up a school that would instill in its students the courage and selflessness that Netaji envisioned for a free India. The first secretary of the Managing Committee was Late Gopi Ballav Saha. The first headmaster of the school was Mr. Satinath Bharadwaj. The school catered to the young children of families that had migrated to Agartala after the Partition of India. Subsequently, NSV flourished under the leadership of Mr. Hirendranath Nandi. Mr. Nandi was an educationist and a devout Netajian who devoted his life in turning the school from a small primary school to a center of excellence in school-level education in the north-eastern region of India. For his contributions to education and teaching, Mr. Nandi was conferred the President of India Gold Medal.

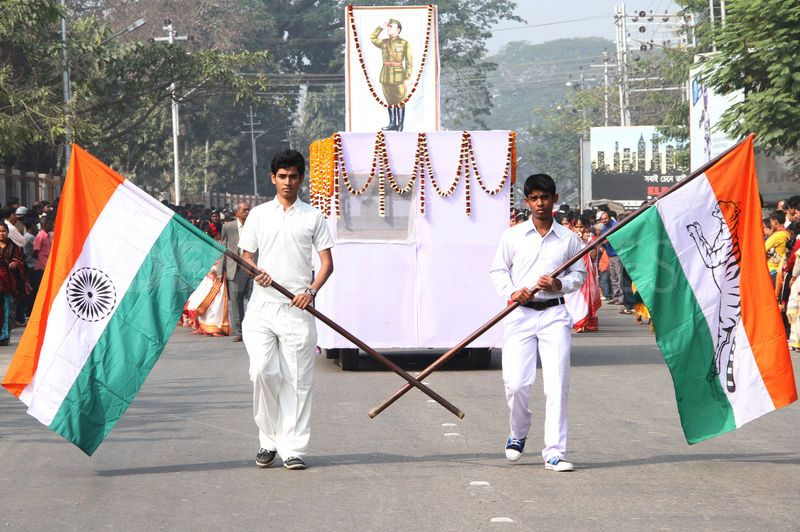
Students leading procession on the streets of Agartala on one of the occasions of Netaji Jayanti

== Netaji Jayanti ==
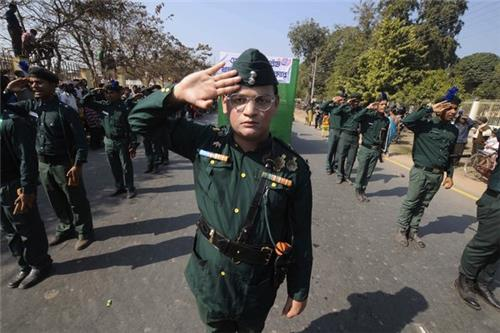
Students enacting Netaji and Indian National Army on one of the Occasions of Netaji Jayanti

Every year, the school celebrates the birthday of Netaji Subhas Chandra Bose on 23 January in a grand manner. The students take part in a three-hour-long colourful procession that marches through the main streets of Agartala. Thousands of people throng the route to get a glimpse of the procession. The procession consists of cultural events performed by the students of every class.

== Education ==
The education offered by the school has a blend of cultural learning, sports and physical fitness teachings along with science, history and literature teachings. In the junior classes, emphasis is placed on cultural events along with academics.

== Foundation Day ==
3 March is the Foundation Day of school. On that day there is cultural programme in the "Sanskrti Bhavan" of school.

== Current status ==
Mrs. Varnali Majumdar is the Headmistress.
