= Nishir Daak (TV series) =

2025 Indian Bengali web series

- Release poster
- Genre: Folk horror; Supernatural thriller
- Created by: Aryaa Ray
- Based on: Nishir daak
- Written by: Sreejib
- Screenplay by: Sreejib
- Directed by: Joydip Mukherjee
- Starring: Surangana Bandyopadhyay; Sreeja Dutta
- Theme music composer: Binit Ranjan Moitra
- Country of origin: India
- Original language: Bengali
- No. of seasons: 1
- No. of episodes: 6

Production
- Producer: Mahendra Soni
- Production location: Kolkata
- Cinematography: Tuban
- Editor: Sumit Chowdhury
- Camera setup: Single-camera
- Running time: 20-24 minutes
- Production company: SVF

Original release
- Release: 17 October 2025

Nishir Daak is a 2025 Indian Bengali language folk horror supernatural thriller web series streaming on "Hoichoi". Conceptualized by Aryaa Ray and written by Sreejib, the series has been directed by Joydip Mukherjee. Produced by Mahendra Soni under the banner of Shree Venkatesh Films, the series stars Surangana Bandyopadhyay and Sreeja Dutta in the lead roles. Rik Chatterjee, Sweta Mishra, Arunava Dey and Anubhav Kanjilal played other pivotal roles.

The series revolves around six PhD students who go to Sonamukhi village to gather details about a lost classical singer Nishigandha Bhaduri. Reaching there, they unknowingly get trapped in Nishi 's curse and realize that the village is haunted from Nishir daak. Sumit Chowdhury has done the editing while the cinematography has been handled by Tuban. It was streamed on "Hoichoi" on 17 October 2025, on the occasion of Kali Puja and Bhoot Chaturdashi.

== Overview ==
Six PhD students researching on Rabindra Sangeet, come across a letter written by Rabindranath Tagore. In it, he had mentioned the name of a singer whose singing Tagore loved himself. The name of the singer was Nishigandha Bhaduri, whose musical legacy has largely been absent in history. She was a forgotten classical singer and the fact that her singing was appreciated by none other than Tagore himself, made Titli and her five friends excited to know and find out about Nishigandha Bhaduri's history. To find out about her, they visited the village of Sonamukhi in West Bengal, where her in-laws' house was situated.

About eighty-five years ago, Nishigandha was married to Sonamukhi village's zamindar's son, Rudrasekhar Ghosal. Upon reaching, they discover that the village of Sonamukhi is cursed and gripped by ancient legend of Nishi. If anyone starts singing after nightfall, then Nishi comes for her revenge. Upon getting a "Nishir daak", the person who sang will ultimately face death in the hands of Nishi. But when they were inside the dilapidated zamindar's house of Nishigandha's in-laws after nightfall, unaware about the curse, they started to sing Tagore songs. This lead them to face the obvious Nishir Daak and this cost them the life of two members of their group.

Their intellectual pursuit turned into a desperate fight for survival as they were caught in Nishi 's curse. Since internet and mobile networks not worked in that village, they could not ask for any help either. Past tragedies about six singers whom Nishi has killed, began to surface and it created a link between the past and the present. Upon uncovering more secrets of the village, Titli comes to know that the topic of their research, Nishigandha Bhaduri, is connected to the curse haunting this village. It is followed by strange occurrences and possessions. The story further reveals how Titli attempts to find the long hidden truth behind Nishi 's wrath, a forgotten sin - in the hope that it will break the village's curse and allow the vengeful spirit of Nishi to get peace, after which she will stop haunting singers.

== Cast ==
- Surangana Bandyopadhyay as Nishigandha Bhaduri and Nishi
- Sreeja Dutta as Titli
- Rik Chatterjee as Neel
- Sweta Mishra
- Arunava Dey
- Anubhav Kanjilal
- Satyam Bhattacharya as Rudrasekhar Ghosal, Nishigandha Bhaduri's husband
- Somak Ghosh
- Mainak Banerjee
- Rajdeep Gupta
- Rounak Dey Bhowmick as Writ
- Mukul Kumar Jana
- Arnab Banerjee
- Chhandak Choudhury

== Episodes ==
No.	Title	Directed by	Written by	Original release date
1	"Obhishaap"	Joydip Mukherjee	Sreejib	October 21, 2025
2	"Notun Didi"	Joydip Mukherjee	Sreejib	October 21, 2025
3	"Shoi"	Joydip Mukherjee	Sreejib	October 21, 2025
4	"Ashalata"	Joydip Mukherjee	Sreejib	October 21, 2025
5	"Porichoy"	Joydip Mukherjee	Sreejib	October 21, 2025
6	"Shubho Bijoya"	Joydip Mukherjee	Sreejib	October 21, 2025

== Production ==
=== Announcement ===
Nishir Daak marked the third collaboration between Satyam Banerjee and Surangana Bandyopadhyay after Ballabhpurer Roopkotha and Seshbela ; and their first collaboration in the OTT space. Nishir Daak also marked a shift for director Joydip Mukherjee, from directing his usual Eken Babu films towards directing a musical horror web series.

=== Development and casting ===
"I took a break from the industry owing to my studies. But when I got the offer for this web series, I understood that I will have to do it. This is my first series with director Joydip Mukherjee. I have learnt a lot from this series, specially the technical sides."

— Sreeja Dutta, sharing her experience of working in Nishir Daak

Surangana Bandyopadhyay said in an interview that the aspect which drew her the most when she was narrated the script for the first time was that how music was connected to the storyline. Mainak Banerjee was cast in a cameo appearance.

=== Filming ===
I find it fascinating to portray a possessed character, as I have no emotional memory to draw from. My performance relies solely on the craft. I just carefully read the script, intently listen to what the director wants out of the scene or out of the whole series and try my best to do justice to the character given. Convincing the audience that I’m happy, or sad, or falling in love and convincing the audience that I’m possessed is equally difficult. I usually try not to think of it as a character in a horror film or series, or as a character who is possessed; it’s just another character that I need to do convincingly.

— Surangana Bandyopadhyay, during an interview with t2 Online

Sreeja Dutta shared one of her shooting experiences when they were filming in Bolpur at 2 am in the night. She said "A set light suddenly dropped and everyone was scared. Somehow the schedule was completed and everyone went home. In fact, I have felt a touch during the filming. Actually there are a lot of events associated with the old mansions and hence I believe, there is a certain type of energy in those places which results in these eerie feelings."

== Soundtrack ==
The series features five Rabindra Sangeets in its soundtrack, all of which has been penned and composed by Rabindranath Tagore. The songs have been rearranged by Binit Ranjan Moitra.

Track listing
No.	Title	Lyrics	Music	Singer(s)	Length
1.	"Majhe Majhe Tabo Dekha Pai"	Rabindranath Tagore	Rabindranath Tagore	–	–
2.	"Aay Tobe Shohochori"	Rabindranath Tagore	Rabindranath Tagore	–	–
3.	"Sarat Tomar Arun Alor Anjali"	Rabindranath Tagore	Rabindranath Tagore	–	–
4.	"Hare Rere Rere"	Rabindranath Tagore	Rabindranath Tagore	–	–

== Release ==
The series was streamed on 21 October 2025 on the Bengali OTT platform "Hoichoi", on the occasion of Kali Puja and Bhoot Chaturdashi.

== Marketing ==
Character posters for the main characters were released in September 2025. The teaser of the series was released on 4 October 2025.

The trailer for the web series was released on 10 October 2025.

== Reception ==
=== Critical reception ===
Sandipta Bhanja of Sangbad Pratidin reviewed the series and wrote "Nishir Daak is quite an entertaining web series in the horror genre during this time of Kali Puja. It successfully sends down shivers along your spine." She praised the acting of Surnagana Bandyopadhyay as Nishi and Sreeja Dutta, and the fear inducing storytelling but criticized the screenplay and production. She added that the to-and-fro shift between the past and present might confuse the viewers and also mentioned that that the writing and screenplay for the cursed episode could have been better.

Parama Dasgupta of Aajkal reviewed the series and opined "The storyline of Nishir Daak juxtaposes the royalty of periodic pieces with the story of this generation's youngsters. The parallel storyline quite interestingly blends horror folklore with new age fervor." She praised the vibrant cinematography, the background score, perfect usage of jump-scares by the director and Sreeja and Surangana's performance. But she bemoaned the inconsistent ending and the easily predictable twist at the end. She also added that that a number of unnecessary characters could have been curtailed.
