= Sankar Chatterjee (politician) =

Indian politician (born 1966)

- শঙ্কর চট্টোপাধ্যায়

Member of West Bengal Legislative Assembly
- Incumbent
- Assumed office 4 May 2026
- Preceded by: Chiranjeet
- Constituency: Barasat

Personal details
- Born: 1966 (age 59–60)
- Citizenship: Indian
- Party: Bharatiya Janata Party
- Profession: Politician

Sankar Chatterjee (born 1966) is an Indian politician from West Bengal. He is a member of the West Bengal Legislative Assembly from the Barasat Assembly constituency in North 24 Parganas district representing the Bharatiya Janata Party.

== Early life and education ==
Chatterjee is from Barasat, North 24 Parganas district, West Bengal. He is the son of the late Adyanath Chatterjee. He completed his BCom at a college affiliated with University of Calcutta in the year 1986. He and his wife run their family business. He declared assets worth Rs.24 lakhs in 2021 and Rs.14 lakhs in 2026, in his affidavits to the Election Commission of India.

== Career ==
Chatterjee won the Barasat Assembly constituency representing the Bharatiya Janata Party in the 2026 West Bengal Legislative Assembly election. He polled 1,22,171 votes and defeated his nearest rival, Sabyasachi Dutta of the All India Trinamool Congress by a margin of 34,558 votes. Earlier in the 2021 West Bengal Legislative Assembly election, he contested on the BJP ticket and polled 80,648 votes but lost to Chiranjeet Chakrabarti of the All India Trinamool Congress by a margin of 23,783 votes.
