= Gariahater Ganglords =

Bengali web series

- Genre: Comedy
- Directed by: Atreyee Sen
- Country of origin: India
- Original language: Bengali
- No. of seasons: 1
- No. of episodes: 10

Production
- Production company: SVF

Original release
- Release: 13 January 2018

Gariahater Ganglords is a Bengali web series streaming on Bengali OTT platform hoichoi. The series is directed by Atreyee Sen and Produced by SVF. It is a story which includes a slightly dark tone which reflects what actually happening in the underworld. Gariahater Ganglords is a story of comedy of errors that revolving around a young wannabe gang lord called Johny and his blind-and-partly-deaf partner Bunty. Everything was going fine unless Johny’s young cousin Buchku came from Malda. Buchku moves in with the gangster duo, filling their lives with a blend of his naivety, stupidity, and wildness. As the comic gangsters live together, it leads to a series of unlucky yet hilarious incidents. The Series starring Saurav Das, Anindita Bose, Ayan Bhattacharjee, Debmalya Gupta in central characters. Hoichoi also released a song from this web series named ‘Gorom Gorilla’ which features Kanchan Mallick.

== Cast ==
- Saurav Das
- Anindita Bose
- Ayan Bhattacharjee
- Debmalya Gupta

== Season 1 (2018) ==
The series started streaming worldwide on hoichoi from 13 January 2018 with 10 episodes.

== Episodes ==
No.	Title	Directed by	Original release date
1	"Bukey aaye bhaai"	Atreyee Sen	13 January 2018
2	"Bandit der Bandparty"	Atreyee Sen	13 January 2018
3	"Deadbody-r saathey date"	Atreyee Sen	13 January 2018
4	"Buchku jokhon birpurush"	Atreyee Sen	13 January 2018
5	"Ekti Kyalaney Kidnapping er Kahini"	Atreyee Sen	13 January 2018
6	"Super-sonkot-e Superstar"	Atreyee Sen	13 January 2018
7	"Ganglords der G**re baansh"	Atreyee Sen	13 January 2018
8	"Biography-r bisri hyal"	Atreyee Sen	13 January 2018
9	"Mafia ra jokhon Meniberal"	Atreyee Sen	13 January 2018
10	"Season seshey Satyanarayan"	Atreyee Sen	13 January 2018
