= Swapnasandhani =

Bengali theater group from Kolkata

- Swapnasandhani group logo
- Formation: 29 May 1992
- Type: Theatre group
- Location: Kolkata, West Bengal, India
- Members: Kaushik Sen, Chitra Sen, Reshmi Sen, Ditipriya Sarkar , Rabindranath Jana, Riddhi Sen, Monalisa Pal, Surangana Bandyopadhyay
- Artistic director: Kaushik Sen

Swapnasandhani (Bengali: Shopnoshondhānī) is a Bengali theater group from Kolkata. The group was founded on 29 May 1992. Swapnasandhani has been marked by the acting and direction of Kaushik Sen.

== Performance ==
From 2006, Swapnasandhani began performing on a regular basis at the Sujata Sadan every Saturday. This eliminated their need to wait in queue for free slots at the major theatres like the Academy of Fine Arts, Madhusudan Mancha etc.

== Major productions ==
Since the establishment of the team in 1992, Swapnasandhani has staged 30 full-length plays and 14 short ones. Some of those are:

- Prothom Partha (1996)
- Tiktiki
- Jodubongsho
- Akhipallab
- Prachya
- Ajke Aamar Chhuti
- Bhalo Rakshosher Golpo (2005)
- Banku Babur Bandhu (2006)
- Daakghar (2006)
- Malyaban (2006)
- Suprobhat (2006)
- Dakghor (2007)
- Hargoj (2008) based on a work of Bangladeshi writer Selim Al-Deen
- Bhoy (2009)
- Darjiparar Marjinara (2009) written by Bratya Basu, travels through the squalid rooms and alleys of Calcutta’s biggest red-light district Sonagachhi.
- Birpurush (2010)
- Macbeth (2012) Bengali theatre based on William Shakespeare's play Macbeth.
- Thana Theke Aschi (2013)
- Karkatkrantir Desh (2014)
- Antigone (2015)
- Drohokaal (2016)
- Nirbhaya (2016)
- Ashwatthama (2017)
- 1984 (2018) directed by Debesh Chattopadhyay
- Taraye Taraye (2018)
- Ekla Chawlo Reh (2019)
- Ardhek Manush (2020)
- Kabir Bondhura (2021)
- Hamlet (2022)

== Celebrity appearance ==
- Bengali film and television actress Roopa Ganguly has acted with Swapnasandhani in the theatre Suprabhat, which was based on a novel of Jibanananda Das.
- Actress Arpita Pal acted in the theatre "Notir Pujo", which has been successful.
- Television stars Debdut Ghosh and Rajatava Dutta have acted in "Shei Sumouli"
- Actor Kanchan Mullick has acted in theatre Darjiparar Marjinara, written by Bratya Basu.
- Actor, filmmaker and musician Anjan Dutt has acted in Taraye Taraye
- Veteran Theatre actors Debshankar Halder, Ashoke Mukhopadhyay and Surajit Bandopadhyay acted in 2019's new play Ekla Chawlo Reh.

== Key people ==
- Chitra Sen
- Kaushik Sen
- Reshmi Sen
- Ditipriya Sarkar
- Rabindranath Jana
- Riddhi Sen
- Monalisa Pal
- Surangana Bandyopadhyay
