= Haati Haati Paa Paa =

2025 Indian Bengali film

- Theatrical release poster
- Directed by: Arnab K Middya
- Screenplay by: Priyanka Poddar
- Story by: Priyanka Poddar
- Dialogues by: Priyanka Poddar
- Produced by: Arunava Middya
- Starring: Rukmini Maitra; Chiranjeet Chakraborty
- Cinematography: Indranath Marick
- Edited by: Pronoy Dasgupta
- Music by: Songs: Ranajoy Bhattacharjee; Score: Anirban Ajoy Das
- Production company: Celluloid Films
- Release date: November 28, 2025
- Running time: 124 minutes
- Country: India
- Language: Bengali

Haati Haati Paa Paa (transl. Taking the First Steps) is a 2025 Indian Bengali family drama film directed by Arnab K Middya. Written and conceived by Priyanka Poddar, the film has been produced by Arunava Middya under the banner of Celluloid Films. It stars Rukmini Maitra and Chiranjeet Chakraborty in the lead roles while Anjana Basu, Sandip Bhattacharjee and Tulika Basu play other pivotal roles.

Principal photography took place in December 2024 and first quarter of 2025. Ranajoy Bhattacharjee has composed the soundtrack while Anirban Ajoy Das created the background score. Indranath Marick did the cinematography while Pronoy Dasgupta handled the editing. The film was screened at the 56th International Film Festival of India in November 2025. It was released in the theatres on 28 November 2025.

== Cast ==
- Chiranjeet Chakraborty as Deepak Chakraborty
- Rukmini Maitra as Madhura, Deepak's daughter
- Anjana Basu as Bonolata Sen a.k.a. Kutti Mashi
- Sandip Bhattacharjee as Dr. Anupam Ghosal
- Tulika Basu as Sutapa Miss
- Biswarup Bandyopadhyay as Palash, Madhura's lover
- Eshika Dey as a house-help
- Sayan Ghosh
- Monalisa Chatterjee
- Swagata Basu

== Plot ==
Deepak Chakraborty is a widower who lives with his daughter Madhura. After the death of his wife, Deepak has become more concerned about his daughter's future. Madhura is an independent working woman, and she takes care of her father to make sure that he doesn't feel neglected. Their life together includes frequent small arguments and playful quarrels.

But, Deepak is worried that Madhura might spend her life looking after him instead of starting a family of her own. He therefore, deliberately starts behaving badly towards her, so that she leaves home and gets married. Madhura does not understand why her father suddenly started acting in that way. In the meantime, she comes in a relationship with Palash.

To ensure that his daughter can move on with her own life, Deepak placed a matrimonial advertisement in a newspaper, looking for a bride for himself. This changed the situation between him and Madhura, as she finds it difficult to accept another woman as her mother. But she soon realised that her father does not want her to spend her life looking after him.

Eventually, Madhura decides to arrange a marriage for her father. She understood that the marriage is important because — her father will have someone of his own beside him when she will be married away. So, he won't need to spend the rest of his life alone. They understand each other's intentions and gradually overcome their earlier misunderstandings.

== Production ==
=== Announcement ===
The film was announced with a motion poster on 11 November 2024. It revealed Rukmini Maitra to be playing the principal role in the film. The first poster was released on 12 November 2024. The first character poster from the film, featuring Maitra and Chakraborty, was released on 12 November 2025.

=== Development ===
In an interview, the director said that he and screenwriter Priyanka Poddar developed the story specifically with Rukmini Maitra in mind. Maitra agreed to join the project after hearing the story. The screenplay and dialogues were then revised over several days in consultation with her. The director later narrated the story to Chiranjeet Chakraborty, who was in the United States visiting his daughter at the time. Chakraborty liked the story and agreed to be part of the film.

== Marketing ==
The teaser of Haati Haati Paa Paa was released on 12 October 2025. The trailer was released on 12 November 2025. On 28 November 2025, the film was premiered at PVR INOX at South City Mall in South Kolkata.

== Reception ==
The film was screened at the 56th International Film Festival of India in Goa in November 2025. The screening also served as the film's premiere before its theatrical release.

=== Critical reception ===
Raima Ganguly of The Times of India rated the film 2.5/5 stars and wrote "Haati Haati Paa Paa is uneven and at times unfocused, but it remains heartfelt enough to leave viewers with a lingering thought. The film carries a gentle emotional core, but the journey towards it is not always smooth." She praised the performances of the lead cast, the emotions displayed in the second half and Anjana Basu's screen presence but bemoaned the predictable storyline in the first half, excessively convenient scenes, unnecessary addition of humour, the lustreless pairing between Maitra and Bandyopadhyay, weak writing and the stretched screenplay.

Pooja Basu of News18 reviewed the film and noted "Haati Haati Paa Paa tells the story of a father and daughter. This film not only reveals the father's affection for his daughter, but also the daughter's love for her father." She appreciated the simplicity of the story, its light tone, the message it has tried to deliver regarding an adult's life's and the performances but bemoaned the slow pace in the first half, lack of sufficiently engaging content and the lacklustre songs.

Shampali Moulik of Sangbad Pratidin reviewed the film and highlighted "The idea of the film is good, but the melodrama could have been avoided a bit." She praised the performance of the actors, the music and the cinematography but criticized the poor execution, the unnecessary creation of a pseudo-distance between father and daughter, and the slow pacing in the first half. Angshuman Chakraborty of Jago Bangla reviewed the film and opined "Haati Haati Paa Paa is a clean Bengali film. The story of the life of a middle-class Bengali family has been woven." He applauded the simploe storyline, the performance of the lead actors, Chiranjeet's dialogue delivery, the chemistry between the father and daughter, the performance of the supporting cast, the director's prudence and the message delivered.
