= Binodini Dasi =

Indian actress (1863–1941)

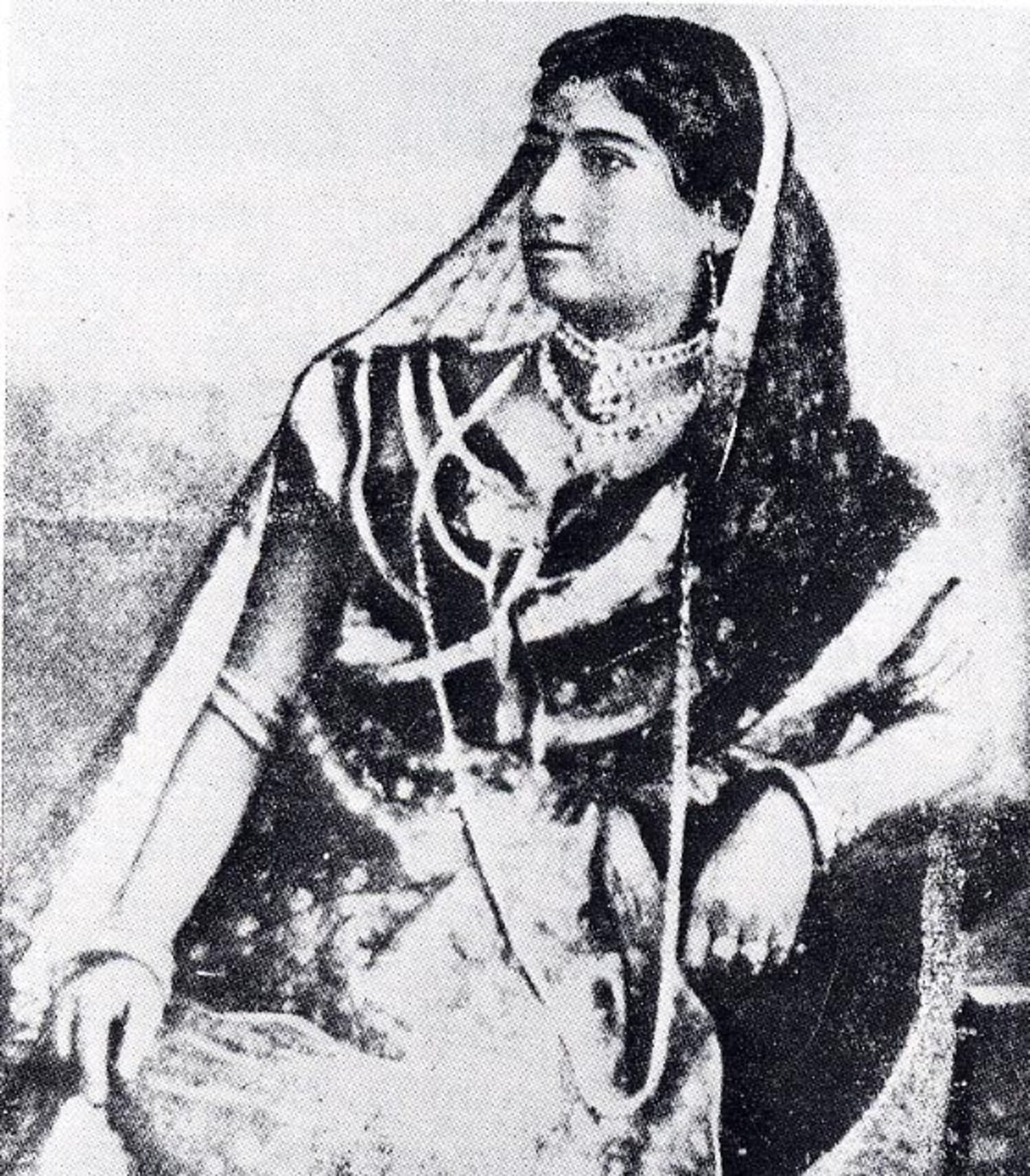
- Born: 1863; Calcutta, Bengal Presidency, British India
- Died: 12 February 1941 (aged 77–78); Calcutta, Bengal Presidency, British India
- Other name: Noti Binodini
- Occupation: Drama actress

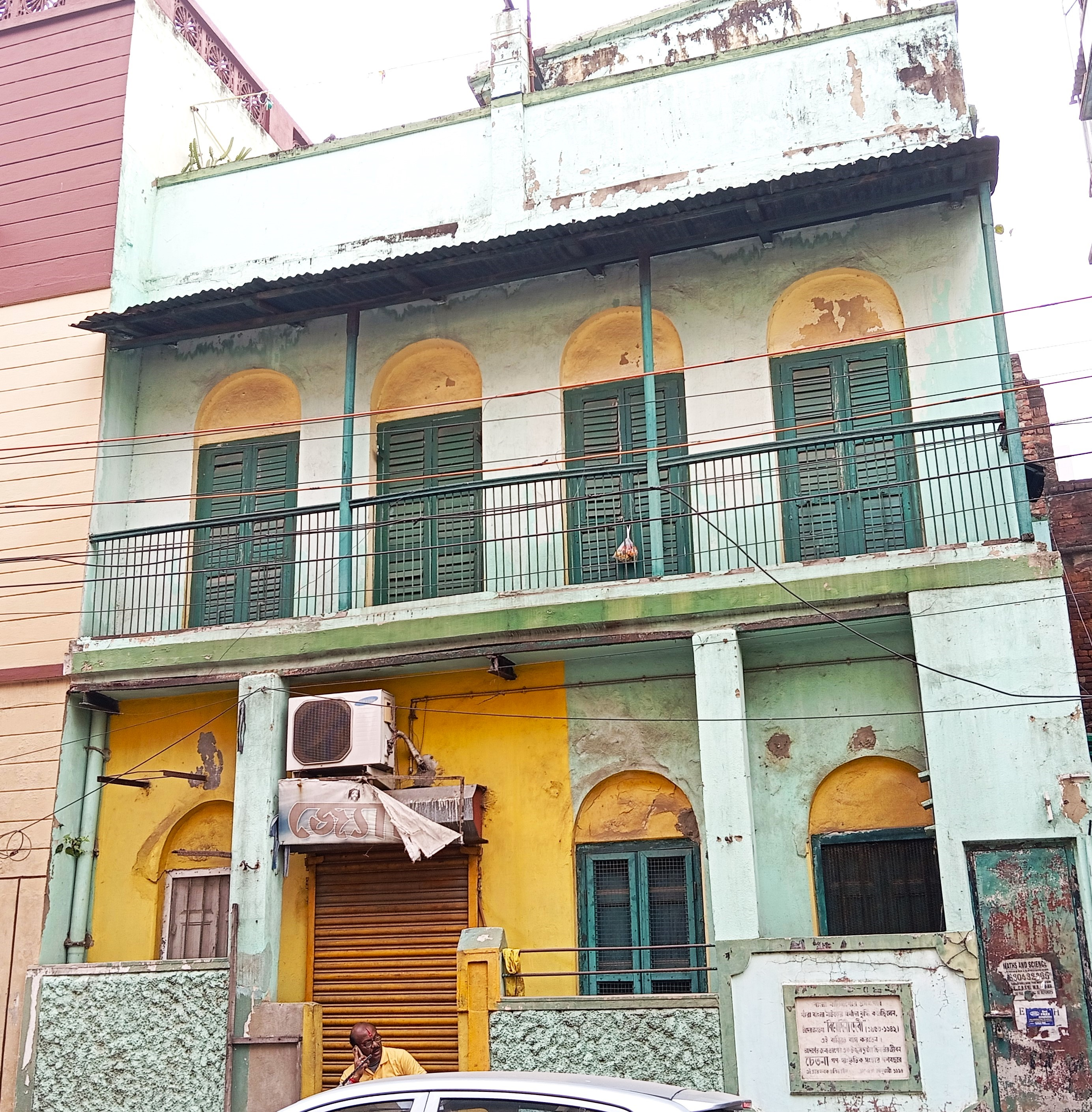
House of Binodini Dasi, Kolkata, India

Binodini Dasi (1863 – 12 February 1941), widely known by her stage name Noti Binodini, was a pioneering Indian Bengali actress, writer, and theatre personality of the 19th century. She began her acting career at the age of twelve in the Bengali theatre, a domain traditionally dominated by men, and achieved widespread fame for her portrayals of mythological and historical female characters.

Despite her immense popularity and critical acclaim, Binodini retired from the stage by the age of twenty-three. Her premature departure was influenced by the social stigma attached to women performers during that period. In 1913, she published her autobiography, Amar Katha (translated into English as My Story and My Life as an Actress), which is considered one of the earliest memoirs by a South Asian actress. This work offers rare insight into the struggles and social prejudices faced by female performers in colonial India, as well as reflections on her own life, relationships, and professional experiences.

Her life and contributions have since been the subject of scholarly research, plays, and films, underlining her role as a trailblazer who challenged the norms of her time.

== Biography ==
Binodini Dasi was born into a poor family. As a child, she followed tawaif Ganga Bai to learn music, accompanied her during music sessions. She was nine when she saw a play for the first time. Awe-struck by the stage, Binodini Dasi expressed her desire to act. She started her career as a tawaif, and at age of twelve, she played her first professional stage role at Calcutta's National Theatre in 1874, under the mentorship of its founder, Girish Chandra Ghosh. Her career coincided with the growth of proscenium-inspired European theatre among the Bengali theatre going audience. During a career spanning twelve years, she enacted over eighty roles, which included those of Pramila, Sita, Draupadi, Radha, Ayesha, Kaikeyi, Motibibi, and Kapalkundala, among others. She was one of the first South Asian theatre actresses to write her own autobiography. Her sudden retirement from the stage is insufficiently explained. Her autobiography has a consistent thread of betrayal. She defied every canon of feminine smritikatha and wrote down what amounted to her indictment of respectable society. Ramakrishna, the great saint of 19th century Bengal, came to see her play in 1884. She was a pioneering entrepreneur of the Bengali stage and introduced modern techniques of stage make-up through blending European and indigenous styles.

== In popular culture ==
- In Dinen Gupta's Bengali film Nati Binodini (1994), Debashree Roy played the character.
- Nati Binodini, a play based on her autobiography, Aamar Kathaa was first presented by National School of Drama Repertory Company in 1995 with the lead role played by actor, Seema Biswas, then in 2006, noted theatre director Amal Allana directed a play by the same name which premiered in Delhi.
- In Abohomaan (2010), directed by Rituparno Ghosh, the role of Binodini was essayed by Ananya Chatterjee.
- In Kadambari (2015), directed by Suman Ghosh, the role of Binodini was essayed by Sreelekha Mitra.
- In Prothoma Kadambini, Diya Mukherjee portrayed the role of Nati Binodini.
- Tuhinabha Majumdar directed Aamaar Katha: Story of Binodini, a documentary based on her autobiography.
- In her biopic titled Binodiini: Ekti Natir Upakhyan, directed by Ram Kamal Mukherjee, the role of Binodini was essayed by Rukmini Maitra.
- In Lawho Gouranger Naam Rey (2025), directed by Srijit Mukherji, the role of Binodini was portrayed by Subhashree Ganguly.
