= Pallab Kirtania =

Indian actor and singer

- Born: 14 August 1964 (age 61)
- Spouse: Debasmita
- Children: Bihan
- Website: http://www.pallabkirtania.com

Pallab Kirtania (born 14 August 1964) is an Indian Bengali male singer-songwriter, writer and actor from Kolkata.

== Education ==
He received his education at Katiahat BKAP Institution, after which he attended Medical College and Hospital, Kolkata.

== Music Album ==
- Shaon
- Ghumer Pata
- Dhulokhela
- Muktobeni

== Books ==
- Ganer Mati (Abhijan Publishers, 2012)
- Patar Porijon (Abhijan Publishers, 2013)
- Patar Canvas (Abhijan Publishers, 2014)
