= Shororipu =

2016 Bengali crime thriller

- Directed by: Ayan Chakraborty
- Written by: Ayan Chakraborty
- Produced by: Subrata Das, Surajit Hari
- Starring: Chiranjeet Chakraborty, Indraneil Sengupta
- Cinematography: Sirsha Ray
- Edited by: Bodhaditya Banerjee
- Music by: Debojyoti Mishra; Dev Sen
- Release date: 17 June 2016
- Running time: 106 minutes
- Country: India
- Language: Bengali

Shororipu is a 2016 Bengali crime thriller film directed by Ayan Chakraborty. The film stars Chiranjeet Chakraborty, Indraneil Sengupta, and Rajatabha Dutta. The film was released on 17 June 2016.

== Plot ==
Five high-profile murders take place one evening. Detective Chandrakanta is called to investigate. He deduces that all the murders are a crime of passion based on six human vices, the Shororipu.

== Cast ==
- Chiranjeet Chakraborty as Detective Chandrakanta
- Indraneil Sengupta as Shekhar
- Rajatabha Dutta as Joshua
- Rudronil Ghosh as Shuvodip
- Sohini Sarkar as Miss July
- Rajesh Sharma as Sharma
- Koneenica Banerjee as Konee
- Sudiptaa Chakraborty as Bonhi
