= Netaji Jayanti =

Birth anniversary of the prominent Indian freedom fighter Netaji Subhas Chandra Bose

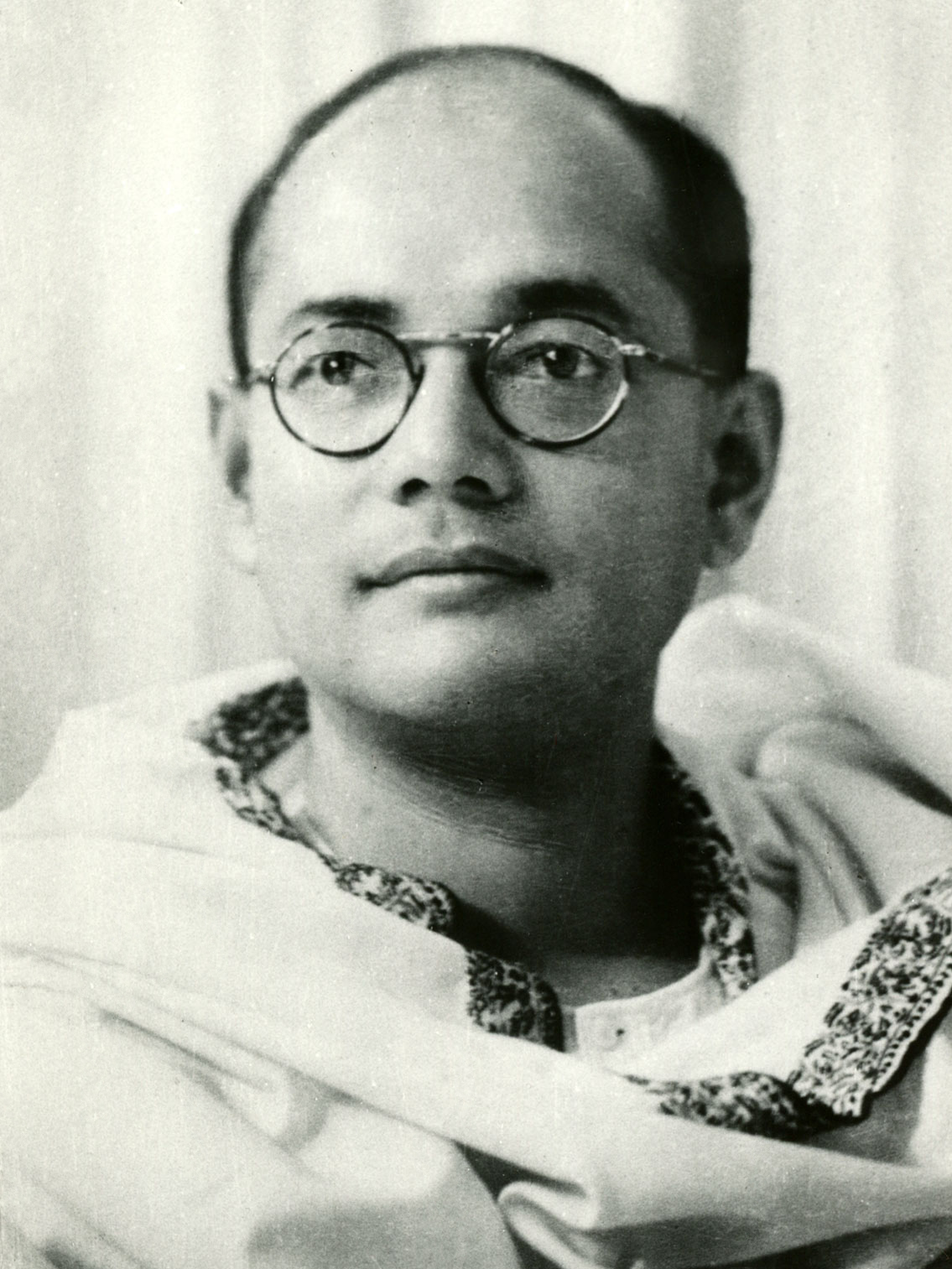
- Official name: Parakram Diwas
- Observed by: India
- Type: Patriotic, National, Traditional
- Significance: Honours Netaji Subhas Chandra Bose's role in Indian independence movement
- Observances: Historical celebrations
- Date: 23 January
- Frequency: Annual

Netaji Jayanti or Netaji Subhas Chandra Bose Jayanti, officially known as Parakram Diwas or Parakram Divas (lit. 'Day of Valour'), is a national event celebrated in India to mark the birthday of the prominent Indian freedom fighter Netaji Subhas Chandra Bose. It is celebrated annually on 23 January. He played a pivotal role in Indian independence movement. He was the head of Indian National Army (Azad Hind Fauj), ( আজাদ হিন্দ ফৌজ). He was the founder-head of the Azad Hind Government.

== Observances ==
About 5 months after the disappearance of Netaji, the Netaji Jayanti was celebrated in Rangoon. It is traditionally observed all over India. It is an official holiday in West Bengal, Jharkhand, Tripura, Assam and Odisha. The Government of India pays tribute to Netaji on this day. Netaji Jayanti was observed as Parakram Diwas for the first time in 2021 on his 124th birth anniversary.

== Issues ==
The Forward Bloc and the family members of Subhas Chandra Bose demanded Government of India to declare Netaji Jayanti as Deshprem Divas (Day of Patriotism) and Mamata Banerjee demanded to declare it as Deshanayak Divas (Day of National Hero) and a national holiday. But on 19 January 2021, the government has announced that it will be celebrated as Parakram Divas (Day of Valour) every year. The members of Netaji Subhas Chandra Bose's family, the ruling Trinamool Congress and the Left parties in West Bengal reacted sharply to the centre's decision to celebrate the icon's birth anniversary on 23 January as Parakram Divas and not by the names they had proposed.

== See also ==
- Public holidays in India
- Netaji Subhas Vidyaniketan
